= 2023–24 Saudi Second Division League =

48th season of the Saudi Second Division

Second Division League
- Season: 2023–24
- Dates: 14 September 2023 – 18 April 2024
- Champions: Neom (1st title)
- Promoted: Neom; Al-Jubail; Al-Zulfi
- Relegated: Al-Shaeib; Afif; Al-Nairyah; Al-Noor
- Matches: 483
- Goals: 1,245 (2.58 per match)
- Top goalscorer: Carolus Andria; Maher Sharoma (18 goals each)
- Biggest home win: Najran 7–0 Al-Entesar (26 March 2024)
- Biggest away win: Al-Sadd 0–5 Bisha (24 November 2023)
- Highest scoring: Jerash 6–4 Al-Qous (23 March 2024)
- Longest winning run: Neom (7 matches)
- Longest unbeaten run: Bisha (21 matches)
- Longest winless run: Afif (14 matches)
- Longest losing run: Al-Lewaa (7 matches)
- All statistics correct as of 18 April 2024.

The 2023–24 Saudi Second Division League was the third season of the Saudi Second Division League after its rebrand, and the 48th season since its establishment in 1976. The season began on 15 September 2023 and concluded on 18 April 2024 with the final. The group stage draw was held on 12 June 2023.

The final was played on 18 April 2024 between Neom and Al-Jubail. Neom defeated Al-Jubail 3–2 to win their first title.

== Team changes ==
A total of 32 teams contested the league, including 23 sides from the 2022–23 season, 3 relegated teams from the FD League, and 6 promoted teams from the Third Division.

=== To Second Division ===
Promoted from the Third Division

- Mudhar
- Al-Noor
- Al-Jubail
- Afif
- Al-Houra
- Al-Nojoom

Relegated from FD League

- Najran
- Al-Sahel
- Al-Shoulla

=== From Second Division ===
Promoted to FD League

- Al-Najma
- Al-Taraji
- Al-Bukiryah
- Al-Safa
- Al-Jandal

Relegated to the Third Division

- Qilwah
- Al-Sharq
- Al-Nahda
- Sajer

== Teams ==
Group A

Locations of teams in the 2023–24 Saudi Second Division Group A

| Club | Location | Stadium |
|---|---|---|
| Afif | Afif | Al-Dera'a Club Stadium (Dawadmi) |
| Al-Entesar | Rabigh | Al-Entesar Club Stadium |
| Al-Jeel | Al-Hasa (Hofuf) | Prince Abdullah bin Jalawi Stadium |
| Al-Kawkab | Al-Kharj | Al-Shoulla Club Stadium |
| Al-Lewaa | Baqaa | Al-Lewaa Club Stadium |
| Al-Nairyah | Al Nairyah | Al-Nairyah Club Stadium |
| Al-Nojoom | Al-Hasa (Al-Shuqaiq) | Prince Abdullah bin Jalawi Stadium |
| Al-Rawdhah | Al-Hasa (Al-Jeshah) | Al-Rawdhah Club Stadium |
| Al-Rayyan | Haʼil | Al-Jabalain Club Stadium |
| Al-Shoulla | Al-Kharj | Al-Shoulla Club Stadium |
| Al-Taqadom | Al Mithnab | Al-Taqadom Club Stadium |
| Al-Washm | Shaqra | Al-Washm Club Stadium |
| Al-Zulfi | Al Zulfi | Al-Zulfi Club Stadium |
| Mudhar | Qatif | Prince Nayef bin Abdulaziz Stadium |
| Najran | Najran | Prince Hathloul bin Abdul Aziz Sport City Stadium |
| Neom | Tabuk | King Khalid Sport City Stadium |

Group B

Locations of teams in the 2023–24 Saudi Second Division Group B

| Club | Location | Stadium |
|---|---|---|
| Al-Ansar | Medina | Al-Ansar Club Stadium |
| Al-Diriyah | Diriyah | Al-Diriyah Club Stadium |
| Al-Houra | Umluj | Al-Houra Club Stadium |
| Al-Jubail | Jubail | Al-Jubail Club Stadium |
| Al-Noor | Sanabes | Prince Nayef bin Abdulaziz Stadium (Qatif) |
| Al-Qous | Al Khurmah | Al-Qous Club Stadium |
| Al-Sadd | Najaan | Al-Anwar Club Stadium (Hotat Bani Tamim) |
| Al-Sahel | Qatif | Prince Nayef bin Abdulaziz Stadium |
| Al-Saqer | Buraidah (Al-Basr) | Al-Taawoun Club Stadium |
| Al-Shaeib | Huraymila | Irqah Sports Stadium (Riyadh) |
| Arar | Arar | Prince Abdullah bin Abdulaziz bin Musa'ed Sport City Stadium |
| Bisha | Bisha | Bisha University Stadium |
| Hetten | Samtah | King Faisal Sport City Stadium (Jizan) |
| Jerash | Ahad Rafidah | Prince Sultan bin Abdul Aziz Reserve Stadium (Abha) |
| Tuwaiq | Al Zulfi | Al-Zulfi Club Stadium |
| Wej | Ta'if | King Fahd Stadium |

=== Foreign players ===
On 1 June 2023, the SAFF announced that the number of foreign players was increased from 4 per team to 5 per team.

Players name in bold indicates the player is registered during the mid-season transfer window.

| Club | Player 1 | Player 2 | Player 3 | Player 4 | Player 5 | Former Players |
|---|---|---|---|---|---|---|
| Afif | (Armenia) Zaven Badoyan | (Senegal) **Mouhamadou N'Diaye** | (Tunisia) **Maher Nouioui** | (Tunisia) Aymen Trabelsi | (Zambia) **Saith Sakala** | (Kyrgyzstan) Kadyrbek Shaarbekov (Moldova) Maxim Focșa (Romania) Petrișor Voinea (Tunisia) Amara Ferjaoui |
| Al-Ansar | (Algeria) Abdelhakim Amokrane | (Tunisia) Makram Bediri | (Tunisia) Malek Boulaabi | (Tunisia) Aymen Jaballah | | (Democratic Republic of the Congo) Éric Kabwe |
| Al-Diriyah | (Algeria) Sid Ahmed Aouadj | (Algeria) **Hamid Djaouchi** | (Brazil) Rayllan Bruno | (Tunisia) Oussema Ben Ayed | (Tunisia) Mehdi Bensib | (Tunisia) Ahmad Boussaid |
| Al-Entesar | (Algeria) Adil Djabout | (Algeria) **Lahouari Touil** | (Ghana) Lawson Bekui | (Tunisia) **Oussema Boughanmi** | (Tunisia) Malek Miladi | (Algeria) Ibrahim Saidani (Algeria) Khalil Semahi (Cameroon) Emmanuel Mahop (England) Gozie Ugwu (Mali) Alassane Diarra (Tunisia) Bahaeddine Sellami |
| Al-Houra | (Cameroon) Essomba Fouda | (Ivory Coast) Oscar Tahi | (Tunisia) Mohamed Aouichi | (Tunisia) Skander Ben Afia | (Tunisia) Iheb Troudi | |
| Al-Jeel | (Brazil) Júnior Araújo | (Brazil) Edilson Júnior | (Cameroon) **Wilfred Bisso'o** | (Ghana) **Frederick Acheampong** | (Mauritania) **Saidou Barry** | (Brazil) Ramon (Brazil) **Milton Raphael** (Brazil) Wallace (Brazil) Wendson |
| Al-Jubail | (Brazil) **Harrison Cardoso** | (Brazil) Tiago Real | (Brazil) Walmerson | (Morocco) Adnane El Ouardy | (Nigeria) Chidiebere Nwakali | (Tunisia) Fedi Felhi |
| Al-Kawkab | (Brazil) Dudu Figueiredo | (Cameroon) Fabrice Onana | (Madagascar) Carolus Andriamatsinoro | (Nigeria) Tony Edjomariegwe | (Rwanda) Olivier Kwizera | |
| Al-Lewaa | (Tunisia) Ahmed Ammar | (Tunisia) Maher Boulabiar | (Tunisia) Noureddine Chortani | (Tunisia) Fahmi Maâouani | (Zimbabwe) Charlton Mashumba | |
| Al-Nairyah | (Algeria) **Sid Ali Lakroum** | (Algeria) **Hichem Mokhtar** | (Benin) Salim Bawa | (Nigeria) **Emmanuel Uzochukwu** | (Tunisia) Hamza Mabrouk | (Togo) Abdou Ouattara (Tunisia) Achraf Ben Dhiaf (Tunisia) Maher Nouioui |
| Al-Nojoom | (Angola) Aneel Bkaki | (Brazil) **Jullen Sandy** | (Madagascar) Zotsara Randriambololona | (Rwanda) Steve Rubanguka | (Tunisia) Alaeddine Sekrani | (Nigeria) Charles Ikechukwu |
| Al-Noor | (Cameroon) **Christopher Mendouga** | (Guinea) Naby Youssouf Soumah | (Ivory Coast) **Eric Serge** | (Ivory Coast) **Camara Yacouba** | (Morocco) El Mehdi Dahr | (Cameroon) Boris Bissemou (Ivory Coast) Mohamed Sanogo Vieira (Morocco) Mehdi Moulatay |
| Al-Qous | (Algeria) Sofiane Khelili | (Ghana) **William Opoku** | (Togo) **Honoré Kpegba** | (Tunisia) Riadh Frioui | (Tunisia) Aziz Sellami | (Democratic Republic of the Congo) David Molinga (Tunisia) Alaeddine Abbes |
| Al-Rawdhah | (Mauritania) Babacar Diop | (Nigeria) Israel Abia | (Tunisia) Zied Ben Salem | (Tunisia) Sameh Bouhajeb | (Tunisia) Montasser Toumi | |
| Al-Rayyan | (Benin) **Tidjani Anaane** | (Tunisia) Sabri Ameri | (Tunisia) **Mahmoud Ben Salah** | (Tunisia) **Houssin Messaadi** | (Tunisia) Youssef Trabelsi | (Senegal) Mouhamadou N'Diaye (Trinidad and Tobago) Rundell Winchester (Tunisia) Abdallah Berrabeh |
| Al-Sadd | (Algeria) Islam Bouloudene | (Algeria) Abdelhak Sailaa | (Ghana) Emmanuel Mensah | (Tunisia) Chamseddine Samti | | (Nigeria) Blessing Henshaw |
| Al-Sahel | (Algeria) Islam Chahrour | (Benin) Marcellin Koukpo | (Brazil) **Vinícius Boff** | (Republic of the Congo) Bercy Langa Lesse | (Niger) Amadou Moutari | (Algeria) Samir Aiboud (Cameroon) Fabrice Kah |
| Al-Saqer | (Brazil) Venâncio | (Egypt) Alaa Anas | (Mali) Yaqoub Alhassan | (Nigeria) **Robert Odu** | (Tunisia) Bassam Deli | (Egypt) Wahid Mohsen |
| Al-Shaeib | (Brazil) Jeferson | (Brazil) Gabriel Correia | (Serbia) Marko Pantić | (South Africa) **Bantu Mzwakali** | (Yemen) Ali Yahya | (Senegal) Mamadou Lamine Touré (Serbia) Bojan Matić |
| Al-Shoulla | (Ivory Coast) Ismail Kouakou | (Tunisia) Seifeddine Akremi | (Tunisia) **Ahmad Boussaid** | (Tunisia) **Ali Frioui** | (Tunisia) Alaeddine Marzouki | (Libya) Abdallah Al-Shaafi (Morocco) Abdelghafour Mehri |
| Al-Taqadom | (Chad) Maher Sharoma | (Egypt) Ahmed Fawzy | (Egypt) Khalid Salah | (Ghana) Benjamin Afutu | (Tunisia) **Fedi Felhi** | (Tunisia) Hazem Mbarek |
| Al-Washm | (Benin) Arsène Loko | (Chad) Mohammed Alhaj | (Democratic Republic of the Congo) Chris Mugalu | (Portugal) Rafa Miranda | (Tunisia) Alaeddine Bouslimi | |
| Al-Zulfi | (Brazil) Diego | (Brazil) Teco | (Brazil) Vanílson | (Niger) **Abdoulaye Boureima Katkoré** | (Tunisia) Fares Meskini | (Algeria) Abdelkrim Nemdil |
| Arar | (Iraq) Muntadher Abdulsada | (Iraq) **Mustafa Ali** | (Iraq) **Amir Ayad** | (Tunisia) Fehmi Kacem | (Tunisia) Oussama Omrani | (Ghana) Sumaila Abubakari (Japan) Yukiya Sugita |
| Bisha | (Algeria) Mounir Aichi | (Democratic Republic of the Congo) Glody Kilangalanga | (Tunisia) Hassine Ben Chaieb | (Tunisia) Nidhal Ben Salem | (Tunisia) Elyes Brini | |
| Hetten | (Algeria) Lamine Abid | (Morocco) Mouad Chougag | (Morocco) Jamaa Marzougi | (Morocco) Hicham Nouali | (Syria) Mahmoud Al-Youssef | |
| Jerash | (Brazil) Taylon Correa | (Brazil) Gabriel Marques | (Mauritania) Cheikh Saadné | (Nigeria) Wisdom Kanu | (Nigeria) **Dennis Sesugh** | (Brazil) Téssio |
| Mudhar | (Algeria) **Samir Aiboud** | (Burkina Faso) Michel Batiebo | (Tunisia) Jilani Abdessalam | (Tunisia) **Achraf Ben Dhiaf** | (Tunisia) Houssem Eddine Lahbibi | (Tunisia) Oussema Boughanmi (Tunisia) Houssin Messaadi |
| Najran | (Brazil) Caio Henrique | (Brazil) Carlos Henrique | (Guinea-Bissau) Piqueti | (Niger) Ousmane Diabate | (Zambia) **Justin Shonga** | (Ivory Coast) Jumaa Saeed (Mali) Mamadou Cissé |
| Neom | (Brazil) **Tiago Bezerra** | (Brazil) Petros | (Egypt) Mohammad Fouad Abdulhamid | (Ghana) Samuel Owusu | (Tunisia) Mohamed Saghraoui | (Algeria) Adil Djabout (Nigeria) Aniekpeno Udo (Tunisia) Aymen Trabelsi |
| Tuwaiq | (Tunisia) **Mohamed Ameur** | (Tunisia) Maher Labidi | (Tunisia) **Othman Saidi** | (Tunisia) Omar Smari | (Tunisia) **Hakim Teka** | (Guinea) Demba Camara (Ivory Coast) Inters Gui (Mali) Tongo Doumbia |
| Wej | (Algeria) Ahmed Arbaoui | (Algeria) Aziz Fegaâs | (Canada) **Omar Marzouk** | (Canada) **Alexander Zis** | (Tunisia) Khalil Balbouz | (Algeria) Mohand Sediri (Tunisia) Othman Saidi |

== Group A ==
=== League table ===
| Pos | Team | Pld | W | D | L | GF | GA | GD | Pts | Promotion, qualification or relegation |
|---|---|---|---|---|---|---|---|---|---|---|
| 1 | Neom (C, P) | 30 | 21 | 5 | 4 | 68 | 29 | +39 | 68 | Promotion to the First Division and qualification to the final |
| 2 | Al-Zulfi (P) | 30 | 18 | 6 | 6 | 56 | 32 | +24 | 60 | Qualification for the promotion play-offs |
| 3 | Al-Jeel | 30 | 14 | 11 | 5 | 50 | 34 | +16 | 53 | |
| 4 | Al-Rawdhah | 30 | 14 | 10 | 6 | 31 | 24 | +7 | 52 | |
| 5 | Al-Shoulla | 30 | 14 | 6 | 10 | 45 | 37 | +8 | 48 | |
| 6 | Al-Washm | 30 | 12 | 9 | 9 | 36 | 31 | +5 | 45 | |
| 7 | Mudhar | 30 | 11 | 9 | 10 | 40 | 37 | +3 | 42 (Note: Mudhar finished ahead of Najran on head-to-head points: Mudhar: 4 pts, Najran: 1 pts (Najran 2–2 Mudhar, Mudhar 2–0 Najran).) | |
| 8 | Najran | 30 | 12 | 6 | 12 | 50 | 41 | +9 | 42 | |
| 9 | Al-Taqadom | 30 | 11 | 8 | 11 | 38 | 39 | −1 | 41 | |
| 10 | Al-Kawkab | 30 | 10 | 8 | 12 | 34 | 45 | −11 | 38 | |
| 11 | Al-Entesar | 30 | 9 | 7 | 14 | 37 | 54 | −17 | 34 | |
| 12 | Al-Lewaa | 30 | 9 | 6 | 15 | 33 | 41 | −8 | 33 (Note: Al-Lewaa were awarded a 3–0 win over Al-Nojoom due to Al-Nojoom's inability to hold the fixture. In addition, Al-Nojoom were deducted 3 points for the same reason.) | |
| 13 | Al-Rayyan | 30 | 7 | 10 | 13 | 37 | 48 | −11 | 31 | |
| 14 | Al-Nojoom | 30 | 7 | 9 | 14 | 37 | 52 | −15 | 27 | |
| 15 | Afif (R) | 30 | 3 | 12 | 15 | 31 | 51 | −20 | 21 | Relegation to the Third Division |
| 16 | Al-Nairyah (R) | 30 | 3 | 8 | 19 | 33 | 61 | −28 | 17 | Relegation to the Third Division |

Updated to match(es) played on 29 March 2024. Source: saff.com.sa
Rules for classification: 1) Points; 2) Head-to-Head points; 3) Head-to-Head goal difference; 4) Head-to-Head goals scored; 5) Total goal difference; 6) Total goals scored; 7) Play-off (only for deciding champion, promotion and relegation).
(C) Champions; (P) Promoted; (R) Relegated

=== Results ===
| Home \ Away | AFI | ENT | JEL | KAW | LEW | NAI | NOJ | RAW | RAY | SHO | TAQ | WAS | ZUL | MUD | NAJ | NEO |
|---|---|---|---|---|---|---|---|---|---|---|---|---|---|---|---|---|
| Afif | | 1–3 | 1–2 | 0–0 | 3–1 | 1–0 | 0–0 | 1–2 | 2–2 | 1–2 | 1–1 | 1–1 | 0–1 | 2–2 | 2–1 | 1–2 |
| Al-Entesar | 2–0 | | 1–1 | 1–2 | 0–0 | 3–2 | 4–2 | 0–0 | 3–2 | 3–0 | 1–2 | 1–2 | 0–0 | 3–2 | 2–1 | 0–3 |
| Al-Jeel | 1–1 | 2–0 | | 1–1 | 3–0 | 2–2 | 3–1 | 2–0 | 1–0 | 3–2 | 3–1 | 1–1 | 3–3 | 0–1 | 2–3 | 2–3 |
| Al-Kawkab | 0–0 | 3–1 | 1–2 | | 3–2 | 2–0 | 2–2 | 0–0 | 2–1 | 0–3 | 2–3 | 0–3 | 1–2 | 2–1 | 1–1 | 1–4 |
| Al-Lewaa | 1–0 | 1–1 | 0–2 | 3–0 | | 2–0 | 3–0 | 0–1 | 2–2 | 0–0 | 1–0 | 0–1 | 4–0 | 0–1 | 1–1 | 2–2 |
| Al-Nairyah | 4–1 | 1–1 | 1–1 | 1–2 | 3–2 | | 1–2 | 2–4 | 0–1 | 1–2 | 4–2 | 0–1 | 0–3 | 1–3 | 1–1 | 2–4 |
| Al-Nojoom | 4–3 | 2–2 | 2–2 | 0–1 | 1–0 | 4–2 | | 1–1 | 2–1 | 2–1 | 1–1 | 1–2 | 1–1 | 2–1 | 1–2 | 0–4 |
| Al-Rawdhah | 1–1 | 2–1 | 1–3 | 2–1 | 4–2 | 0–0 | 2–0 | | 0–1 | 1–1 | 0–2 | 0–0 | 1–3 | 1–0 | 2–1 | 0–0 |
| Al-Rayyan | 2–2 | 1–0 | 0–0 | 2–0 | 0–1 | 1–1 | 2–2 | 1–0 | | 1–2 | 1–2 | 1–2 | 1–1 | 0–0 | 1–4 | 1–4 |
| Al-Shoulla | 4–2 | 4–0 | 1–3 | 0–2 | 3–1 | 1–0 | 1–0 | 0–1 | 0–1 | | 2–0 | 2–0 | 3–2 | 1–1 | 2–0 | 3–3 |
| Al-Taqadom | 0–0 | 3–0 | 0–1 | 3–1 | 2–1 | 4–1 | 1–0 | 1–2 | 1–1 | 0–0 | | 1–3 | 0–2 | 2–1 | 0–0 | 2–1 |
| Al-Washm | 1–1 | 1–2 | 1–2 | 0–0 | 2–0 | 2–2 | 2–0 | 0–0 | 1–3 | 2–0 | 0–0 | | 0–2 | 0–2 | 2–0 | 1–2 |
| Al-Zulfi | 3–1 | 2–1 | 2–1 | 0–0 | 5–1 | 3–1 | 1–1 | 0–1 | 2–1 | 2–0 | 4–1 | 1–0 | | 3–2 | 4–1 | 2–3 |
| Mudhar | 2–0 | 2–1 | 1–1 | 1–3 | 0–1 | 0–0 | 4–3 | 0–0 | 0–0 | 2–2 | 3–2 | 1–3 | 1–0 | | 2–0 | 1–2 |
| Najran | 3–1 | 7–0 | 3–0 | 4–1 | 0–1 | 1–0 | 1–0 | 0–1 | 6–3 | 0–2 | 0–0 | 4–1 | 1–2 | 2–2 | | 2–1 |
| Neom | 3–1 | 3–0 | 0–0 | 2–0 | 1–0 | 5–0 | 1–0 | 0–1 | 5–3 | 3–1 | 2–1 | 1–1 | 1–0 | 0–1 | 3–0 | |

Updated to match(es) played on 29 March 2024. Source: saff.com.sa
Legend: Blue = home team win; Yellow = draw; Red = away team win.
For upcoming matches, an "a" indicates there is an article about the rivalry between the two participants.

== Group B ==
=== League table ===
| Pos | Team | Pld | W | D | L | GF | GA | GD | Pts | Promotion, qualification or relegation |
|---|---|---|---|---|---|---|---|---|---|---|
| 1 | Al-Jubail (P) | 30 | 20 | 5 | 5 | 49 | 25 | +24 | 65 | Promotion to the First Division and qualification to the final |
| 2 | Al-Diriyah | 30 | 16 | 10 | 4 | 50 | 22 | +28 | 58 | Qualification for the promotion play-offs |
| 3 | Jerash | 30 | 16 | 9 | 5 | 50 | 34 | +16 | 57 | |
| 4 | Bisha | 30 | 15 | 9 | 6 | 55 | 30 | +25 | 54 | |
| 5 | Al-Saqer | 30 | 14 | 7 | 9 | 37 | 30 | +7 | 49 | |
| 6 | Al-Sahel | 30 | 13 | 8 | 9 | 45 | 36 | +9 | 47 | |
| 7 | Wej | 30 | 11 | 9 | 10 | 35 | 39 | −4 | 42 | |
| 8 | Hetten | 30 | 11 | 8 | 11 | 29 | 27 | +2 | 41 | |
| 9 | Arar | 30 | 10 | 10 | 10 | 26 | 41 | −15 | 40 | |
| 10 | Al-Qous | 30 | 11 | 6 | 13 | 32 | 33 | −1 | 39 | |
| 11 | Al-Houra | 30 | 9 | 6 | 15 | 34 | 44 | −10 | 33 | |
| 12 | Al-Sadd | 30 | 6 | 12 | 12 | 27 | 48 | −21 | 30 | |
| 13 | Al-Ansar | 30 | 6 | 11 | 13 | 33 | 43 | −10 | 29 | |
| 14 | Tuwaiq | 30 | 8 | 4 | 18 | 30 | 40 | −10 | 28 | |
| 15 | Al-Shaeib (R) | 30 | 5 | 10 | 15 | 24 | 36 | −12 | 25 | Relegation to the Third Division |
| 16 | Al-Noor (R) | 30 | 3 | 8 | 19 | 25 | 53 | −28 | 17 | Relegation to the Third Division |

Updated to match(es) played on 30 March 2024. Source: saff.com.sa
Rules for classification: 1) Points; 2) Head-to-Head points; 3) Head-to-Head goal difference; 4) Head-to-Head goals scored; 5) Total goal difference; 6) Total goals scored; 7) Play-off (only for deciding champion, promotion and relegation).
(P) Promoted; (R) Relegated

=== Results ===
| Home \ Away | ANS | DIR | HOU | JUB | NOR | QOU | SAD | SAH | SAQ | SHA | ARA | BIS | HET | JER | TUW | WEJ |
|---|---|---|---|---|---|---|---|---|---|---|---|---|---|---|---|---|
| Al-Ansar | | 0–1 | 1–2 | 0–3 | 2–2 | 2–0 | 3–0 | 0–1 | 0–0 | 2–1 | 2–2 | 2–1 | 2–2 | 2–2 | 0–3 | 2–2 |
| Al-Diriyah | 0–0 | | 2–0 | 2–1 | 5–0 | 1–0 | 4–2 | 1–2 | 1–1 | 2–2 | 6–0 | 0–1 | 1–1 | 4–0 | 1–0 | 1–1 |
| Al-Houra | 1–1 | 1–1 | | 1–2 | 1–1 | 0–2 | 0–1 | 2–1 | 2–4 | 1–0 | 0–2 | 2–1 | 1–0 | 4–1 | 3–2 | 1–2 |
| Al-Jubail | 2–0 | 1–0 | 2–1 | | 2–2 | 1–0 | 4–0 | 2–0 | 1–0 | 3–1 | 4–1 | 0–2 | 1–0 | 0–3 | 2–1 | 2–0 |
| Al-Noor | 0–1 | 0–0 | 2–0 | 1–2 | | 0–0 | 1–1 | 2–1 | 0–2 | 0–0 | 1–2 | 1–3 | 1–2 | 0–2 | 2–1 | 1–2 |
| Al-Qous | 4–1 | 0–2 | 2–1 | 2–1 | 1–0 | | 1–1 | 2–0 | 2–0 | 1–0 | 0–1 | 1–3 | 0–1 | 1–3 | 1–0 | 0–0 |
| Al-Sadd | 2–2 | 0–0 | 1–1 | 1–2 | 2–1 | 2–2 | | 1–1 | 1–0 | 1–2 | 2–0 | 0–5 | 1–1 | 2–2 | 1–2 | 2–1 |
| Al-Sahel | 3–2 | 3–3 | 2–1 | 1–1 | 4–0 | 2–1 | 2–0 | | 2–0 | 3–0 | 1–1 | 3–0 | 2–1 | 2–1 | 4–2 | 2–3 |
| Al-Saqer | 2–1 | 1–2 | 0–0 | 2–2 | 2–1 | 1–0 | 3–0 | 0–0 | | 3–1 | 2–1 | 1–2 | 2–2 | 2–1 | 1–0 | 2–0 |
| Al-Shaeib | 1–0 | 1–2 | 2–2 | 1–3 | 2–0 | 0–0 | 0–0 | 2–0 | 0–1 | | 1–1 | 1–2 | 1–1 | 0–0 | 0–1 | 0–1 |
| Arar | 1–0 | 1–3 | 2–1 | 0–1 | 0–0 | 1–1 | 0–1 | 1–1 | 1–0 | 1–1 | | 1–1 | 0–0 | 1–1 | 1–0 | 1–0 |
| Bisha | 1–1 | 1–1 | 1–0 | 1–1 | 4–1 | 1–2 | 3–0 | 1–1 | 3–1 | 2–0 | 4–0 | | 1–2 | 1–2 | 1–1 | 4–1 |
| Hetten | 2–1 | 0–1 | 1–2 | 0–1 | 2–1 | 1–0 | 0–0 | 1–0 | 0–1 | 1–0 | 1–2 | 0–1 | | 1–0 | 0–1 | 3–0 |
| Jerash | 2–1 | 2–1 | 1–0 | 0–0 | 2–1 | 6–4 | 3–2 | 1–1 | 3–1 | 1–0 | 3–0 | 0–0 | 1–0 | | 3–0 | 0–0 |
| Tuwaiq | 0–2 | 0–1 | 1–2 | 0–1 | 3–2 | 0–2 | 0–0 | 2–0 | 0–1 | 1–1 | 3–0 | 2–2 | 1–2 | 0–1 | | 2–1 |
| Wej | 0–0 | 0–1 | 3–1 | 2–1 | 2–1 | 1–0 | 2–0 | 2–0 | 1–1 | 0–3 | 0–1 | 2–2 | 1–1 | 3–3 | 2–1 | |

Updated to match(es) played on 30 March 2024. Source: saff.com.sa
Legend: Blue = home team win; Yellow = draw; Red = away team win.
For upcoming matches, an "a" indicates there is an article about the rivalry between the two participants.

== Promotion play-offs ==
Both teams that finish second in Groups A and B will face each other in a two-legged match with the winner gaining promotion to the FD League. Al-Zulfi, who finished second in Group A, will face Al-Diriyah, who finished second in Group B. The first leg will be played on 6 April and the second leg on 17 April. Al-Zulfi defeated Al-Diriyah 3–0 on aggregate to secure promotion to the FD League.

| Team 1 | Agg. | Team 2 | 1st leg | 2nd leg |
|---|---|---|---|---|
| Al-Diriyah | 0–3 | Al-Zulfi | 0–3 | 0–0 |

First leg

6 April 2024
22:00

| Al-Diriyah | 0–3 | Al-Zulfi |
|---|---|---|
| | Report | Al-Mutairi 33'; Bensib 89' (o.g.); Teco 90+5' |

Al-Shabab Club Stadium, Riyadh
Attendance: 8,148
Referee: Shukri Al-Hanfoush

Second leg

17 April 2024
16:00

| Al-Zulfi | 0–0 | Al-Diriyah |
|---|---|---|
| | Report |

Al-Zulfi Club Stadium, Al Zulfi
Referee: Sultan Al-Harbi

== Final ==
The winners of each group will play a single-legged final on 18 April to decide the champion of the 2023–24 Second Division. As winners of Group A, Neom will face Al-Jubail, the winners of Group B. The match will be held at Neom's home stadium because they finished with more points. Neom defeated Al-Jubail 3–2 to win their first title.

18 April 2024
19:30 AST

| Neom | 3–2 | Al-Jubail |
|---|---|---|
| Bezerra 14'; Harzan 45+2'; Fouad 85' | Report | El Ouardy 3'; Al-Hudifi 79' |

King Khalid Sport City Stadium, Tabuk
Referee: Ali Al-Qahtani

== Statistics ==
As of 18 April 2024

=== Scoring ===
==== Top scorers ====
| Rank | Player | Club | Goals |
|---|---|---|---|
| 1 | (Madagascar) Carolus Andria | Al-Kawkab | 18 |
| 1 | (Chad) Maher Sharoma | Al-Taqadom | 18 |
| 3 | (Angola) Aneel Bakaki | Al-Nojoom | 17 |
| 3 | (Morocco) Adnane El Ouardy | Al-Jubail | 17 |
| 5 | (Benin) Marcellin Koukpo | Al-Sahel | 16 |
| 6 | (Ivory Coast) Oscar Tahi | Al-Houra | 14 |
| 6 | (Brazil) Diego Silva | Al-Zulfi | 14 |
| 6 | (Tunisia) Alaeddine Marzouki | Al-Shoulla | 14 |
| 9 | (Nigeria) Israel Abia | Al-Rawdhah | 13 |
| 9 | (Saudi Arabia) Motaz Gharwi | Najran | 13 |

==== Hat-tricks ====
| Player | For | Against | Result | Date | Ref. |
|---|---|---|---|---|---|
| (Nigeria) Israel Abia | Al-Rawdhah | Al-Lewaa | 4–2 (H) | 21 October 2023 | |
| (Burkina Faso) Michel Batiebo | Mudhar | Al-Nairyah | 3–1 (A) | 21 October 2023 | |
| (Saudi Arabia) Salim Al-Khebari | Al-Nojoom | Afif | 4–3 (H) | 29 December 2023 | |
| (Saudi Arabia) Motaz Gharwi | Najran | Al-Rayyan | 6–3 (H) | 11 January 2024 | |
| (Republic of the Congo) Bercy Langa Lesse | Al-Sahel | Al-Diriyah | 3–3 (H) | 12 January 2024 | |
| (Morocco) Adnane El Ouardy | Al-Jubail | Al-Shaeib | 3–1 (H) | 8 February 2024 | |
| (Tunisia) Othman Saidi | Tuwaiq | Al-Ansar | 3–0 (A) | 14 February 2024 | |
| (Egypt) Ahmed Fawzy | Al-Taqadom | Al-Kawkab | 3–1 (H) | 20 February 2024 | |
| (Brazil) Vinícius Boff^{4} | Al-Sahel | Al-Noor | 4–0 (H) | 16 March 2024 | |
| (Chad) Maher Sharoma | Al-Taqadom | Al-Nairyah | 4–1 (H) | 22 March 2024 | |
| (Nigeria) Dennis Sesugh | Jerash | Al-Qous | 6–4 (H) | 23 March 2024 | |
| (Togo) Honoré Kpegba^{4} | Al-Qous | Jerash | 4–6 (A) | 23 March 2024 | |
| (Saudi Arabia) Motaz Gharwi | Najran | Al-Entesar | 7–0 (H) | 26 March 2024 | |
| (Saudi Arabia) Jassem Al-Hamdan | Al-Nairyah | Afif | 4–1 (H) | 29 March 2024 | |

Note

(H) – Home; (A) – Away
^{4} Player scored 4 goals

== Number of teams by province ==
| Rank | Province | Number | Teams |
|---|---|---|---|
| 1 | Riyadh | 9 | Afif, Al-Diriyah, Al-Kawkab, Al-Sadd, Al-Shaeib, Al-Shoulla, Al-Washm, Al-Zulfi, and Tuwaiq |
| 2 | Eastern Province | 8 | Al-Jeel, Al-Jubail, Al-Nairyah, Al-Nojoom, Al-Noor, Al-Rawdhah, Al-Sahel, and Mudhar |
| 3 | Mecca | 3 | Al-Entesar, Al-Qous, and Wej |
| 4 | Al-Qassim | 2 | Al-Saqer and Al-Taqadom |
| 4 | Asir | 2 | Bisha and Jerash |
| 4 | Ha'il | 2 | Al-Lewaa and Al-Rayyan |
| 4 | Tabuk | 2 | Al-Houra and Neom |
| 8 | Jazan | 1 | Hetten |
| 8 | Medina | 1 | Al-Ansar |
| 8 | Najran | 1 | Najran |
| 8 | Northern Borders | 1 | Arar |

== See also ==
- 2023–24 Saudi Professional League
- 2023–24 Saudi First Division League
- 2023–24 Saudi Third Division
