= 2022–23 Saudi Second Division League =

46th season of the Saudi Second Division

Second Division League
- Season: 2022–23
- Dates: 30 September 2022 – 30 April 2023
- Champions: Al-Najma (3rd title)
- Promoted: Al-Najma; Al-Taraji; Al-Bukiryah; Al-Safa; Al-Jandal
- Relegated: Qilwah; Al-Sharq; Al-Nahda; Sajer
- Matches: 483
- Goals: 1,153 (2.39 per match)
- Top goalscorer: Aniekpeno Udo (23 goals)
- Biggest home win: Al-Qous 5–0 Al-Lewaa (16 December 2022)
- Biggest away win: Al-Sharq 0–6 Al-Washm (17 December 2022); Sajer 0–6 Al-Suqoor (7 February 2023)
- Highest scoring: Al-Suqoor 2–5 Al-Najma (3 December 2022); Jerash 5–2 Tuwaiq (26 February 2023); Al-Taraji 4–3 Al-Jandal (5 March 2023)
- Longest winning run: Al-Najma (10 matches)
- Longest unbeaten run: Al-Safa (18 matches)
- Longest winless run: Al-Sharq (16 matches)
- Longest losing run: Al-Ansar (7 matches)
- All statistics correct as of 30 April 2023.

The 2022–23 Saudi Second Division League was the second season of the Saudi Second Division League after its rebrand, and the 47th season since its establishment in 1976. The season began on 30 September 2022 and concluded on 30 April 2023 with the final. The group stage draw was held on 9 June 2022. Fixtures for the 2022–23 season were announced on 25 August 2022.

The final was played on 30 April 2023 between Al-Najma and Al-Taraji. Al-Najma defeated Al-Taraji 2–1 to win their third title and first since 2010.

== Overview ==
=== Changes ===
On 9 October 2020, the Saudi FF announced that the number of teams in the league would be increased to 32, with each group consisting of 16 teams, starting from the 2022–23 season. To prepare for these changes it was announced that only 3 teams would be promoted to the MS League and 5 teams would be relegated from the MS League in the 2021–22 season.

On 14 April 2022, the Saudi FF announced that the number of teams in the Pro League would be increased from 16 to 18 teams. To prepare for this change, only 2 teams would be relegated to the First Division League and 4 teams would be promoted to the Pro League. This meant that 5 teams would be promoted from the Second Division to the First Division instead of the usual 3.

== Team changes ==
A total of 32 teams contested the 2022–23 league, including 21 sides from the 2020–21 season, 5 relegated teams from the FD League, and 6 promoted teams from the Third Division.

=== To Second Division ===
Promoted from the Third Division

- Al-Suqoor
- Al-Qous
- Jerash
- Sajer
- Qilwah
- Al-Shaeib

Relegated from FD League

- Al-Jeel
- Al-Diriyah
- Al-Nahda
- Al-Kawkab
- Bisha

=== From Second Division ===
Promoted to FD League

- Al-Arabi
- Al-Qaisumah
- Al-Riyadh

Relegated to the Third Division

- Al-Dahab
- Afif
- Al-Nojoom
- Al-Thoqbah

== Teams ==
Group A

Locations of teams in the 2022–23 Saudi Second Division Group A

Club	Location	Stadium
Al-Bukiryah	Al Bukayriyah	Al-Bukiryah Club Stadium
Al-Diriyah	Diriyah	Prince Turki bin Abdul Aziz Stadium (Riyadh)
Al-Entesar	Rabigh	Al-Entesar Club Stadium
Al-Jandal	Dumat al-Jandal	Al-Orobah Club Stadium (Sakakah)
Al-Lewaa	Baqaa	Al-Jabalain Club Stadium (Ha'il)
Al-Nahda	Dammam	Prince Fahd bin Salman Stadium
Al-Qous	Al Khurmah	Al-Qous Club Stadium
Al-Sadd	Najaan	Al-Shoulla Club Stadium (Al-Kharj)
Al-Saqer	Buraidah (Al-Basr)	Al-Taawoun Club Stadium
Al-Taqadom	Al Mithnab	Al-Najma Club Stadium (Unaizah)
Al-Taraji	Qatif	Al-Khaleej Club Stadium
Arar	Arar	Prince Abdullah bin Abdulaziz bin Musa'ed Sport City Stadium
Hetten	Samtah	King Faisal Sport City Stadium (Jizan)
Jerash	Ahad Rafidah	Prince Sultan bin Abdul Aziz Reserve Stadium (Abha)
Qilwah	Qilwah	Qilwah Club Stadium
Tuwaiq	Al Zulfi	Al-Zulfi Club Stadium

Group B

Locations of teams in the 2022–23 Saudi Second Division Group B

Club	Location	Stadium
Al-Ansar	Medina	Al-Ansar Club Stadium
Al-Jeel	Al-Hasa (Hofuf)	Prince Abdullah bin Jalawi Stadium
Al-Kawkab	Al-Kharj	Al-Shoulla Club Stadium
Al-Nairyah	Al Nairyah	Al-Ettifaq Club Stadium
Al-Najma	Unaizah	Al-Najma Club Stadium
Al-Rawdhah	Al-Hasa (Al-Jeshah)	Prince Abdullah bin Jalawi Stadium
Al-Rayyan	Haʼil	Al-Jabalain Club Stadium
Al-Safa	Safwa City	Al-Safa Club Stadium
Al-Shaeib	Huraymila	Irqah Sports Stadium (Riyadh)
Al-Sharq	Ad-Dilam	Al-Shoulla Club Stadium (Al-Kharj)
Al-Suqoor	Tabuk	King Khalid Sport City Stadium
Al-Washm	Shaqra	Al-Washm Club Stadium
Al-Zulfi	Al Zulfi	Al-Zulfi Club Stadium
Bisha	Bisha	Bisha University Stadium
Sajer	Sajir	Al-Washm Club Stadium (Shaqra)
Wej	Ta'if	King Fahd Stadium

=== Foreign players ===
The number of foreign players was increased from 3 players per team to 4 players per team.

Players name in bold indicates the player is registered during the mid-season transfer window.

Club	Player 1	Player 2	Player 3	Player 4	Former Players
Al-Ansar	(Ivory Coast) Soumahoro Bangaly	(Jamaica) Chevaughn Walsh	(Tunisia) Chaker Rguiî		(Algeria) Sid Ahmed Aouadj (Algeria) Amar Djabou
Al-Bukiryah	(Serbia) Nemanja Kojčić	(Syria) Izaldin Al Awad	(Tunisia) **Alaeddine Marzouki**	(Tunisia) Youssef Trabelsi	(The Gambia) Bubacarr Sumareh
Al-Diriyah	(Algeria) **Ferraz Kamel**	(Mali) **Aboubacar Diarra**	(Tunisia) Oussema Ben Ayed	(Tunisia) Mehdi Bensib	(Colombia) **Bladimir Díaz** (Tunisia) Nassim Chachia (Tunisia) Yassine Salhi
Al-Entesar	(Algeria) **Ahmed Gagaâ**	(Chad) Maher Sharoma	(Ghana) **Lawson Bekui**	(Morocco) **Karim El Oualadi**	(Ivory Coast) Konan Ahuie (Tunisia) Houssem Bnina (Tunisia) Amine Khalloufi (Tunisia) **Anis Khedher**
Al-Jandal	(Madagascar) Njiva Rakotoharimalala	(Nigeria) Aniekpeno Udo	(Tunisia) Rafik Mednini	(Tunisia) Sabri Zaidi	
Al-Jeel	(Brazil) **Edilson**	(Brazil) **Bruno Matos**	(Brazil) **Gelson Mello**	(Mali) **Modibo Maïga**	(Brazil) Sidevaldo Pereira (Ivory Coast) Alphonse Kouamé (Jordan) Mohamed Al Hasanat (Morocco) Hamza Goudali
Al-Kawkab	(Cameroon) **Jerome Mpacko-Etame**	(Rwanda) Olivier Kwizera	(Senegal) Pape Mamadou Sow	(Tunisia) **Ghazi Ayadi**	(Mali) Abdoul Razak Coulibaly (Nigeria) Cyril Olisema
Al-Lewaa	(Brazil) Maycon Santana	(Jordan) **Muath Afaneh**	(Nigeria) Imran Ilyas Bakur	(Zambia) Saith Sakala	(Nigeria) Victory Omodiagbe
Al-Nahda	(Brazil) **Ricardo Verza**	(Egypt) **Khalid Salah**	(Mali) Idrissa Traoré	(Morocco) **Yassine Dahbi**	(Algeria) Sid Ali Lakroum (Ivory Coast) Guillaume Daho (Nigeria) Kenneth Ikechukwu
Al-Nairyah	(Algeria) **Zoubir Motrani**	(Cameroon) Fabrice Onana	(Jordan) **Mohammad Al-Kloub**	(Tunisia) Achraf Ben Dhiaf	(Tunisia) Ahmad Boussaid (Tunisia) Omar Lamti
Al-Najma	(Algeria) Hichem Mokhtar	(Portugal) Rafa Miranda	(Senegal) Abdoulaye Dieng	(Tunisia) Seifeddine Akremi	
Al-Qous	(Egypt) **Ahmad Hamdy**	(Gabon) Johann Lengoualama	(Morocco) **Jamaa Marzougi**	(Tunisia) Houssem Eddine Lahbibi	(Egypt) Ibrahim Eisa (Senegal) Pape Camara
Al-Rawdhah	(Netherlands) **Soufyan Ahannach**	(Nigeria) Israel Abia	(Tunisia) **Amine Mhadhebi**	(Tunisia) Selim Rebai	(Ivory Coast) Didier Pepe (Tunisia) Houssem Tabboubi
Al-Rayyan	(Jordan) **Mohamed Abu Arqoub**	(Tunisia) Abdallah Berrabeh	(Tunisia) Semah Bouhajeb	(Tunisia) Alaeddine Sekrani	(Nigeria) Junior Lokosa
Al-Sadd	(Algeria) **Abdessamed Bounoua**	(Algeria) Abdelhak Sailaa	(Angola) Aneel Bkaki	(Mauritania) **Mohamed Salem**	(Algeria) Akrem Demane (Algeria) Kaddour Beldjilali
Al-Safa	(Morocco) Adnane El Ouardy	(Tunisia) Jilani Abdessalam	(Tunisia) Mohamed Aouichi	(Tunisia) Malek Miladi	
Al-Saqer	(Argentina) **Franco Romero**	(Egypt) Alaa Anas	(Ivory Coast) **Lassina Diaby**	(Senegal) Pape Babacar	(Senegal) Mame Balla Diop (Senegal) Abdou Samb
Al-Shaeib	(Brazil) Araújo	(Brazil) Jeferson	(Nigeria) **Stanley Ohawuchi**	(Yemen) Ali Yahya	(Democratic Republic of the Congo) Jordan Nkololo
Al-Sharq	(Algeria) **Oussama Aggar**	(Algeria) **Billel Bensaha**	(Algeria) **Sofiane Khelili**	(Mali) Harouna Samake	(Mauritania) Mohamed Salem (Tunisia) Wajdi Mejri (Tunisia) Edem Rjaïbi
Al-Suqoor	(Algeria) Mohamed Benyahia	(Algeria) **Adil Djabout**	(Ivory Coast) Hamed Touré	(Mauritania) **Mohamed M'Bareck**	(Algeria) Mehdi Benaldjia (Democratic Republic of the Congo) Grace Tanda
Al-Taqadom	(Egypt) Mahmoud El Ghazaly	(Ghana) Benjamin Afutu	(Ghana) Bernard Arthur	(Ghana) Kwabena Nyanteh	
Al-Taraji	(Senegal) Abdou Aziz Ndiaye	(Tunisia) Mohammed Ben Abdessalem	(Tunisia) Mahmoud Ben Salah	(Tunisia) Houssine Messadi	
Al-Washm	(Algeria) **Amir Karaoui**	(Chad) Mohammed Alhaj	(Niger) **Yousef Omar**	(Tunisia) Alaeddine Bouslimi	(Mauritania) Fody Traoré (Nigeria) Stanley Ohawuchi
Al-Zulfi	(Algeria) **Sid Ahmed Aouadj**	(Tunisia) Skander Ben Afia	(Tunisia) **Ahmad Boussaid**	(Tunisia) Fehmi Kacem	(Ghana) Emmanuel Banahene (Tunisia) Amir Omrani
Arar	(Ivory Coast) **Guillaume Daho**	(Morocco) Salaheddine Bahi	(Tunisia) **Khaled Gharsellaoui**	(Tunisia) **Oussama Omrani**	(Tunisia) Adel Hmani (Tunisia) Chiheb Jbeli (Tunisia) Othman Saidi
Bisha	(Central African Republic) **Samuel Nlend**	(Ivory Coast) Oscar Tahi	(Senegal) **Pape Camara**	(Tunisia) Sabri Ameri	(Netherlands) Tarik Kada (Tunisia) Rabii Bouzid
Hetten	(Brazil) Carlos Coppetti	(Cameroon) Patrick Ngoula	(Guinea) **Kerfala Kouyaté**	(Syria) Mahmoud Al-Youssef	(Switzerland) Raël Lolala
Jerash	(Brazil) **Anderson Paraíba**	(Brazil) Vanílson	(Mauritania) Cheikh Saadné	(Tunisia) Sami Hammami	(Tunisia) Haythem Mhamdi
Qilwah	(Cameroon) **Blaise Ngoh**	(Nigeria) **Charles Ikechukwu**	(Nigeria) **Daniel Nosike**	(Tunisia) **Maher Labidi**	(Brazil) Harrison Cardoso (Nigeria) Robert Odu (Syria) Khaled Haj Othman (Tunisia) Anis Khedher
Sajer	(Brazil) Cléber Prado	(Tunisia) **Ahmed Amri**	(Tunisia) **Lassaad Jaziri**	(Tunisia) **Nizar Touil**	(Algeria) Riad Gharrich (Brazil) Wesley Simeão (Brazil) Valdo Bacabal
Tuwaiq	(Morocco) Anouar El Azizi	(Nigeria) Chidiebere Nwakali	(Tunisia) Wajdi Mejri	(Tunisia) **Omar Smari**	(Tunisia) Mohamed Said Karchoud
Wej	(Algeria) **Islam Bouloudene**	(Algeria) **Akrem Demane**	(Algeria) **Chamseddine Harrag**	(Tunisia) Hazem Mbarek	(Brazil) Thales Lima (Ivory Coast) Josue Mohy (Ivory Coast) Patrick Gbala

== Group A ==
=== League table ===
Pos	Team	Pld	W	D	L	GF	GA	GD	Pts	Promotion, qualification or relegation
1	Al-Taraji (P)	30	16	8	6	48	32	+16	56	Promotion to the First Division and qualification to the Final
2	Al-Bukiryah (P)	30	15	10	5	41	27	+14	55	Promotion to the First Division
3	Al-Jandal (P)	30	14	8	8	58	44	+14	50	Qualification for the promotion play-offs
4	Tuwaiq	30	14	7	9	43	36	+7	49	
5	Al-Saqer	30	11	14	5	36	27	+9	47	
6	Jerash	30	12	8	10	44	40	+4	44	
7	Arar	30	11	9	10	35	31	+4	42	
8	Al-Sadd	30	9	12	9	41	36	+5	39	
9	Al-Entesar	30	10	8	12	32	38	−6	38 (Note: Al-Entesar finished ahead of Al-Diriyah on head-to-head points: Al-Entesar: 6 pts, Al-Diriyah: 0 pts (Al-Entesar 3–0 Al-Diriyah, Al-Diriyah 1–2 Al-Entesar).)	
10	Al-Diriyah	30	8	14	8	28	31	−3	38	
11	Al-Taqadom	30	8	11	11	29	36	−7	35	
12	Hetten	30	7	11	12	32	39	−7	32 (Note: Positions determined by head-to-head points: Hetten: 7 pts and +1 GD; Al-Lewaa: 7 pts and –1 GD; Al-Qous: 3 pts.)	
13	Al-Lewaa	30	7	11	12	28	38	−10	32	
14	Al-Qous	30	8	8	14	28	37	−9	32	
15	Qilwah (R)	30	8	7	15	27	39	−12	31	Relegation to the Third Division
16	Al-Nahda (R)	30	5	8	17	25	44	−19	23	Relegation to the Third Division

Updated to match(es) played on 7 April 2023. Source: saff.com.sa
Rules for classification: 1) Points; 2) Head-to-Head points; 3) Head-to-Head goal difference; 4) Head-to-Head goals scored; 5) Total goal difference; 6) Total goals scored; 7) Play-off (only for deciding champion, promotion and relegation).
(P) Promoted; (R) Relegated

=== Results ===
Home \ Away	BUK	DIR	ENT	JAN	LEW	NAH	QOU	SAD	SAQ	TAQ	TAR	ARA	HET	JER	QIL	TUW
Al-Bukiryah		1–0	2–2	1–2	2–0	2–1	2–0	1–0	2–2	3–2	2–1	1–0	4–1	0–0	1–1	2–1
Al-Diriyah	1–0		1–2	3–2	2–1	4–1	1–1	1–0	0–0	1–0	0–1	0–0	1–3	1–1	1–0	1–1
Al-Entesar	0–0	3–0		2–1	3–2	1–0	1–2	1–1	3–2	0–0	1–1	2–1	0–0	0–1	1–0	1–2
Al-Jandal	0–1	2–2	0–0		2–0	2–1	2–3	3–2	2–1	2–0	1–1	2–2	4–1	3–1	4–1	1–2
Al-Lewaa	0–0	2–2	3–0	0–1		1–1	1–0	2–1	2–0	0–1	1–1	4–0	2–0	1–2	0–3	2–2
Al-Nahda	0–3	1–2	2–1	1–1	0–0		0–2	1–2	1–0	0–0	2–3	0–1	0–3	3–1	2–0	0–2
Al-Qous	2–0	0–0	1–0	3–3	5–0	0–0		2–1	0–1	1–2	0–2	0–2	0–3	0–0	1–0	0–2
Al-Sadd	1–1	1–1	1–0	0–1	2–0	1–1	1–1		0–1	2–0	2–3	2–1	1–1	3–1	3–1	1–0
Al-Saqer	3–1	1–1	2–2	1–0	4–2	1–0	2–0	1–1		0–0	0–0	1–1	0–0	1–1	1–1	2–0
Al-Taqadom	1–1	2–0	3–0	1–2	0–0	0–2	1–1	0–0	1–3		0–0	3–2	1–1	3–2	2–1	0–2
Al-Taraji	0–1	1–1	0–2	4–3	1–1	2–1	3–1	2–1	1–2	3–1		1–0	1–0	3–2	5–1	1–2
Arar	2–0	0–0	2–0	1–1	0–1	3–2	1–1	2–2	1–2	3–1	0–0		2–1	3–0	0–0	0–1
Hetten	2–2	1–0	3–0	1–2	0–0	1–1	1–0	2–2	1–1	0–0	0–2	1–2		0–3	0–1	2–3
Jerash	1–3	2–0	0–1	3–3	0–0	3–0	2–1	2–2	1–1	3–1	0–2	1–0	3–1		1–0	5–2
Qilwah	0–1	0–0	3–2	2–4	0–0	2–1	1–0	0–2	2–0	1–1	2–0	1–2	1–1	0–1		1–2
Tuwaiq	1–1	1–1	2–1	3–2	3–0	0–0	2–0	3–3	0–0	0–2	2–3	0–1	0–1	2–1	0–1	

Updated to match(es) played on 7 April 2023. Source: saff.com.sa
Legend: Blue = home team win; Yellow = draw; Red = away team win.
For upcoming matches, an "a" indicates there is an article about the rivalry between the two participants.

== Group B ==
=== League table ===
Pos	Team	Pld	W	D	L	GF	GA	GD	Pts	Promotion, qualification or relegation
1	Al-Najma (C, P)	30	19	7	4	46	22	+24	64	Promotion to the First Division and qualification to the Final
2	Al-Safa (P)	30	16	10	4	41	20	+21	58	Promotion to the First Division
3	Bisha	30	15	10	5	41	21	+20	55	Qualification for the promotion play-offs
4	Al-Kawkab	30	15	8	7	31	24	+7	53	
5	Al-Nairyah	30	12	11	7	42	32	+10	47	
6	Al-Zulfi	30	11	13	6	47	33	+14	46	
7	Al-Rawdhah	30	10	14	6	43	29	+14	44	
8	Al-Jeel	30	11	9	10	31	31	0	42	
9	Wej	30	10	6	14	38	46	−8	36 (Note: Wej finished ahead of Al-Rayyan on head-to-head goal difference: Wej +1 GD, Al-Rayyan –1 GD (Wej 3–1 Al-Rayyan, Al-Rayyan 2–1 Wej).)	
10	Al-Rayyan	30	9	9	12	32	35	−3	36	
11	Al-Ansar	30	7	10	13	32	46	−14	31	
12	Al-Washm	30	6	12	12	37	40	−3	30	
13	Al-Shaeib	30	7	7	16	27	46	−19	28	
14	Al-Suqoor	30	5	12	13	34	46	−12	27	
15	Al-Sharq (R)	30	5	11	14	26	46	−20	26	Relegation to the Third Division
16	Sajer (R)	30	3	9	18	21	52	−31	18	Relegation to the Third Division

Updated to match(es) played on 8 April 2023. Source: saff.com.sa
Rules for classification: 1) Points; 2) Head-to-Head points; 3) Head-to-Head goal difference; 4) Head-to-Head goals scored; 5) Total goal difference; 6) Total goals scored; 7) Play-off (only for deciding champion, promotion and relegation).
(C) Champions; (P) Promoted; (R) Relegated

=== Results ===
Home \ Away	ANS	JEL	KAW	NAI	NAJ	RAW	RAY	SAF	SHA	SHR	SUQ	WAS	ZUL	BIS	SAJ	WEJ
Al-Ansar		1–1	1–0	1–2	1–3	1–1	0–2	3–2	1–0	3–3	1–1	2–1	1–1	0–2	1–2	2–1
Al-Jeel	3–2		0–1	1–0	0–1	2–2	1–1	0–0	1–0	1–0	2–0	1–0	0–1	2–1	1–1	1–0
Al-Kawkab	1–0	1–0		0–0	0–2	1–0	2–1	1–1	3–1	1–0	1–2	1–0	3–2	2–1	1–0	1–2
Al-Nairyah	4–1	2–2	0–0		0–0	1–3	2–0	1–2	5–1	2–0	1–0	0–2	2–2	2–1	1–1	2–2
Al-Najma	4–0	3–2	1–1	2–1		1–3	2–1	1–0	2–0	2–0	2–1	0–0	1–0	1–1	3–1	3–2
Al-Rawdhah	2–2	0–1	2–0	0–0	0–1		1–1	1–1	3–1	2–1	2–2	1–1	0–1	1–1	4–0	2–0
Al-Rayyan	1–1	1–0	0–1	2–2	0–2	0–2		0–1	2–0	1–2	1–1	2–1	0–0	2–0	3–0	2–1
Al-Safa	2–1	4–0	0–1	2–0	1–0	0–0	2–1		3–0	3–0	0–1	2–2	1–0	1–0	2–1	2–1
Al-Shaeib	1–0	0–1	2–0	1–3	1–0	0–2	1–0	0–0		3–2	1–1	2–0	1–1	1–1	2–2	2–3
Al-Sharq	1–1	3–2	1–1	1–2	0–0	2–1	0–0	0–0	1–3		1–1	0–6	0–3	0–0	1–2	0–0
Al-Suqoor	0–0	0–2	1–2	1–2	2–5	2–2	1–1	0–2	2–1	0–0		0–3	1–1	1–2	0–0	2–1
Al-Washm	1–0	2–2	1–1	1–1	0–1	3–3	1–2	1–1	1–1	1–2	2–0		1–1	0–3	2–0	2–2
Al-Zulfi	1–2	1–1	1–1	0–0	2–0	3–2	0–0	3–3	2–1	3–2	2–2	3–0		1–1	3–2	5–1
Bisha	2–1	2–1	1–0	2–0	1–1	0–0	3–1	0–0	3–0	0–0	3–1	3–0	1–0		2–1	2–1
Sajer	0–1	0–0	1–3	0–1	0–0	0–0	2–3	0–1	0–0	2–0	0–6	1–1	1–3	0–2		0–2
Wej	1–1	1–0	0–0	1–3	1–2	0–1	3–1	1–2	1–0	0–3	3–2	2–1	2–1	0–0	3–1	

Updated to match(es) played on 8 April 2023. Source: saff.com.sa
Legend: Blue = home team win; Yellow = draw; Red = away team win.
For upcoming matches, an "a" indicates there is an article about the rivalry between the two participants.

== Promotion play-offs ==
Both teams that finish third in Groups A and B will face each other in a two-legged match with the winner gaining promotion to the FD League. Al-Jandal, who finished third in Group A, faced Bisha, who finished third in Group B. The first leg was played on 24 April and the second leg on 29 April. Al-Jandal defeated Bisha 4–2 on aggregate to secure promotion to the FD League.

Team 1	Agg.	Team 2	1st leg	2nd leg
Al-Jandal	4–2	Bisha	2–1	2–1

First leg

24 April 2023
16:10

Al-Jandal	2–1	Bisha
Udo 43'; Zaidi 90+1'	Report	Nlend 19'

Al-Orobah Club Stadium, Sakakah
Referee: Abdulsamad Bakri

Second leg

29 April 2023
16:10

Bisha	1–2	Al-Jandal
Tahi 40'	Report	Udo 30', 86'

Bisha University Stadium, Bisha
Referee: Mohammed Al-Buraidi

== Final ==
The winners of each group will play a single-legged final on 30 April to decide the champion of the 2022–23 Second Division. As winners of Group A, Al-Taraji will face Al-Najma, the winners of Group B. The match was held at Al-Najma's home stadium due to them finishing with more points. Al-Najma defeated Al-Taraji 2–1 to win their third title and first since 2010.

30 April 2023
19:15 AST

Al-Najma	2–1	Al-Taraji
Miranda 50'; Mokhtar 54'	Report	Ben Abdessalem 65'

Al-Najma Club Stadium, Unaizah
Referee: Mamdouh Al Shahdan

== Statistics ==
As of 30 April 2023

=== Scoring ===
==== Top scorers ====
Rank	Player	Club	Goals
1	(Nigeria) Aniekpeno Udo	Al-Jandal	23
2	(Morocco) Adnane El Ouardy	Al-Safa	19
3	(Senegal) Abdou Aziz Ndiaye	Al-Taraji	17
4	(Brazil) Vanílson	Jerash	15
4	(Nigeria) Israel Abia	Al-Rawdhah	15
6	(Saudi Arabia) Jassem Al-Hamdan	Al-Nairyah	12
6	(Saudi Arabia) Mohamed Abbas	Al-Ansar	12
6	(Tunisia) Mohammed Ben Abdessalem	Al-Taraji	12
6	(Madagascar) Njiva Rakotoharimalala	Al-Jandal	12
10	(Angola) Aneel Bkaki	Al-Sadd	11
10	(Chad) Maher Sharoma	Al-Entesar	11
10	(Tunisia) Sabri Zaidi	Al-Jandal	11
10	(Ivory Coast) Oscar Tahi	Bisha	11

==== Hat-tricks ====
Player	For	Against	Result	Date	Ref.
(Tunisia) Mohammed Ben Abdessalem	Al-Taraji	Qilwah	5–1 (H)	30 September 2022	
(Nigeria) Aniekpeno Udo	Al-Jandal	Al-Qous	3–3 (A)	22 October 2022	
(The Gambia) Bubacarr Sumareh^{4}	Al-Bukiryah	Hetten	4–1 (H)	29 October 2022	
(Saudi Arabia) Faisal Al-Mutairi	Al-Najma	Al-Jeel	3–2 (H)	17 December 2022	
(Brazil) Vanílson	Jerash	Al-Taqadom	3–1 (H)	23 December 2022	
(Saudi Arabia) Jassem Al-Hamdan	Al-Nairyah	Al-Shaeib	5–1 (H)	13 January 2023	
(Nigeria) Aniekpeno Udo	Al-Jandal	Qilwah	4–2 (A)	21 January 2023	
(Algeria) Akrem Demane	Wej	Al-Suqoor	3–2 (H)	2 February 2023	
(Saudi Arabia) Abdullah Al-Saihani	Tuwaiq	Al-Sadd	3–3 (H)	4 March 2023	
(Senegal) Abdou Aziz Ndiaye	Al-Taraji	Al-Jandal	4–3 (H)	5 March 2023	
(Saudi Arabia) Mesned Al-Enezi	Al-Zulfi	Sajer	3–1 (A)	5 April 2023	

Note

(H) – Home; (A) – Away
^{4} Player scored 4 goals

== Number of teams by province ==
Rank	Province	Number	Teams
1	Riyadh	9	Al-Diriyah, Al-Kawkab, Al-Sadd, Al-Shaeib, Al-Sharq, Al-Washm, Al-Zulfi, Sajer and Tuwaiq
2	Eastern Province	6	Al-Jeel, Al-Nahda, Al-Nairyah, Al-Rawdhah, Al-Safa and Al-Taraji
3	Al-Qassim	4	Al-Bukiryah, Al-Najma, Al-Saqer and Al-Taqadom
4	Mecca	3	Al-Entesar, Al-Qous and Wej
5	Asir	2	Bisha and Jerash
5	Ha'il	2	Al-Lewaa and Al-Rayyan
7	Al-Bahah	1	Qilwah
7	Al Jawf	1	Al-Jandal
7	Jazan	1	Hetten
7	Medina	1	Al-Ansar
7	Northern Borders	1	Arar
7	Tabuk	1	Al-Suqoor

== See also ==
- 2022–23 Saudi Professional League
- 2022–23 Saudi First Division League
- 2022–23 Saudi Third Division
