= 2022–23 Saudi First Division League =

First Division League
- Season: 2022–23
- Dates: 22 August 2022 – 29 May 2023
- Champions: Al-Ahli (1st title)
- Promoted: Al-Ahli; Al-Okhdood; Al-Hazem; Al-Riyadh
- Relegated: Najran; Al-Sahel; Al-Shoulla
- Matches: 306
- Goals: 709 (2.32 per match)
- Top goalscorer: Ablaye Mbengue (29 goals)
- Biggest home win: Al-Shoulla 3–0 Al-Orobah (22 August 2022); Al-Hazem 4–1 Najran (5 September 2022); Al-Ahli 3–0 Ohod (16 September 2022); Al-Hazem 3–0 Al-Arabi (11 January 2023); Al-Ahli 3–0 Al-Jabalain (24 January 2023); Al-Qadsiah 3–0 Ohod (16 May 2023); Al-Faisaly 4–1 Al-Ain (23 May 2023); Al-Okhdood 4–1 Najran (29 May 2023)
- Biggest away win: Al-Shoulla 0–5 Al-Jabalain (28 December 2022)
- Highest scoring: Al-Riyadh 3–3 Al-Arabi (6 March 2023); Al-Okhdood 4–2 Al-Orobah (9 April 2023); Jeddah 2–4 Al-Okhdood (24 April 2023)
- Longest winning run: Al-Riyadh (8 matches)
- Longest unbeaten run: Al-Ahli (16 matches)
- Longest winless run: Al-Shoulla (26 matches)
- Longest losing run: Al-Shoulla (8 matches)
- All statistics correct as of 29 May 2023.

The 2022–23 First Division League (known as the Yelo League for sponsorship reasons) was the second season of the Saudi First Division League after its rebrand, and the 46th season of the Saudi First Division since its establishment in 1976. The season started on 22 August 2022 and concluded on 29 May 2023.

On 5 May, Al-Ahli became the first team to be promoted following Al-Faisaly's 2–2 draw with Najran. They were crowned champions following a 1–0 win against Al-Qadsiah on 23 May. The second club to be promoted was Al-Okhdood who were promoted after Al-Faisaly's 2–2 draw with Jeddah on 15 May. The third club to be promoted was Al-Riyadh who were promoted following a 1–0 home win against Al-Orobah. The fourth and final club to be promoted was Al-Hazem who were promoted following a 3–2 win against Al-Sahel.

On 1 May, Al-Shoulla became the first team to be relegated following Jeddah's 1–0 win against Al-Orobah. On 23 May, Al-Sahel became the second team to be relegated despite a 3–2 win against Al-Okhdood. Najran became the third and final club to be relegated after a 4–1 defeat to derby rivals Al-Okhdood on the final matchday.

== Overview ==
=== Changes ===
On 9 October 2020, the Saudi FF announced that the number of teams in the league would be decreased to 18 starting from the 2022–23 season. Due to this decision, 5 teams were relegated last season instead of the usual 4 teams. In addition, only 3 teams were promoted from the Second Division instead of 4 teams.

On 14 April 2022, the Saudi FF announced that the number of teams in the Pro League would be increased from 16 to 18 teams. To prepare for this change, only 2 teams would be relegated to the First Division League and 4 teams would be promoted to the Pro League.

== Team changes ==
The following teams have changed division since the 2022–23 season.

=== To the First Division League ===
Promoted from Second Division

- Al-Arabi
- Al-Qaisumah
- Al-Riyadh

Relegated from Pro League

- Al-Hazem
- Al-Ahli
- Al-Faisaly

=== From the First Division League ===
Promoted to Pro League

- Al-Khaleej
- Al-Adalah
- Al-Wehda

Relegated to Second Division

- Al-Jeel
- Al-Diriyah
- Al-Nahda
- Al-Kawkab
- Bisha

== Teams ==
A total of 18 teams are contesting the league, including 12 sides from the 2021–22 season, the three promoted teams from the Second Division and the three relegated sides from the Pro League.

The first club to be relegated to the First Division League was Al-Hazem following a 5–2 defeat away to Al-Ettifaq on 21 May. Al-Hazem were relegated after just one year in the top flight. This was their second relegation in three years. Both Al-Ahli and Al-Faisaly were relegated following on the final day of the season. Al-Ahli were relegated following a 0–0 away draw with Al-Shabab. Al-Ahli were relegated for the first time in their history while Al-Faisaly were relegated after 12 consecutive seasons in the top flight.

The first club to be promoted was Al-Arabi who were promoted following a 1–0 home win against Al-Rawdhah on 30 March 2022. On 31 March 2022, Al-Qaisumah became the second side to be promoted following a 2–1 win over Al-Nairyah. The third and final club to be promoted was Al-Riyadh, who were promoted following a 3–2 aggregate win over Al-Taraji in the promotion play-offs.

Al-Arabi were crowned champions after defeating Al-Qaisumah 1–0 to win their second title and first since 1986.

Al-Arabi returned to the First Division League after an absence of 27 years. They returned to the league for the first time since the 1994–95 season and would play in their 9th overall season. Al-Qaisumah returned after an absence of three seasons and would play in their 4th overall season in the First Division League. Al-Riyadh returned after an absence of six seasons and would play in their 18th overall season in the First Division League.

=== Stadia and locations ===
Locations of teams in the 2022–23 First Division League

Note: Table lists in alphabetical order.

Team	Location	Stadium	Capacity
Al-Ahli	Jeddah	Prince Abdullah Al-Faisal Stadium	27,000
Al-Ain	Al Bahah	King Saud Sport City Stadium	10,000
Al-Arabi	Unaizah	Department of Education Stadium	10,000
Al-Faisaly	Harmah	Al Majma'ah Sports City (Al Majma'ah)	7,000
Al-Hazem	Ar Rass	Al-Hazem Club Stadium	8,000
Al-Jabalain	Ha'il	Prince Abdul Aziz bin Musa'ed Stadium	12,000
Al-Kholood	Ar Rass	Al-Hazem Club Stadium	8,000
Al-Okhdood	Najran	Prince Hathloul bin Abdul Aziz Sport City Stadium; Najran University Stadium	12,000; 10,000
Al-Orobah	Sakakah	Al-Orobah Club Stadium	6,000
Al-Qadsiah	Khobar	Prince Saud bin Jalawi Stadium	15,000
Al-Qaisumah	Hafar al-Batin	Al-Batin Club Stadium	6,000
Al-Riyadh	Riyadh	Prince Turki bin Abdul Aziz Stadium	15,000
Al-Sahel	Anak	Prince Saud bin Jalawi Stadium (Khobar)	15,000
Al-Shoulla	Al-Kharj	Al-Shoulla Club Stadium	5,200
Hajer	Al-Hasa (Hofuf)	Hajer Club Stadium	12,000
Jeddah	Jeddah	Reserve Stadium in King Abdullah Sports City	1,000
Najran	Najran	Prince Hathloul bin Abdul Aziz Sport City Stadium; Najran University Stadium	12,000; 10,000
Ohod	Medina	Prince Mohammed bin Abdul Aziz Stadium	24,000

=== Foreign players ===
On 15 April 2022, the Saudi FF announced that the number of foreign players was increased from 5 players to 6 players.

Players name in bold indicates the player is registered during the mid-season transfer window.

Club	Player 1	Player 2	Player 3	Player 4	Player 5	Player 6	Former Players
Al-Ahli	(Algeria) Ryad Boudebouz	(Angola) Bastos	(Brazil) **Marcão**	(The Gambia) **Modou Barrow**	(Netherlands) Hicham Faik	(Uruguay) **Nicolás Milesi**	(Cameroon) Franck Kom (England) Lewis Grabban (Tunisia) Youssef Abdelli
Al-Ain	(Algeria) Hicham Belkaroui	(Algeria) Ibrahim Chenihi	(Algeria) Lahouari Touil	(Jordan) **Abdallah Al-Fakhouri**	(Jordan) **Majdi Attar**	(Jordan) **Mohannad Khairullah**	(Nigeria) Okiemute Odah (Ba'athist Syria) Thaer Krouma (Tunisia) Alaeddine Marzouki
Al-Arabi	(Brazil) Sandro Manoel	(Brazil) Wellington	(Ivory Coast) Cheick Comara	(Morocco) **Mohammed El Fakih**	(Senegal) Ablaye Mbengue	(Senegal) Birama Ndoye	(Netherlands) Soufyan Ahannach
Al-Faisaly	(Argentina) **Mariano Vázquez**	(Cape Verde) **Willy Semedo**	(Croatia) **Josip Vuković**	(Kenya) **Masoud Juma**	(Morocco) Omar Arjoune		(Bosnia and Herzegovina) Marin Jurina (Brazil) Cassiano (Brazil) Ismael (Brazil) Rossi (Morocco) Reda Hajhouj
Al-Hazem	(Brazil) **Paulo Ricardo**	(Cameroon) **Joel Tagueu**	(Egypt) **Youssef Obama**	(Ghana) **Francis Cann**	(Ivory Coast) **Ben Traoré**	(Netherlands) Ola John	(Brazil) Uilliam (Morocco) Abdelilah Hafidi (Morocco) Nawfel Zerhouni (Niger) Yousef Omar (Serbia) Luka Stojanović
Al-Jabalain	(Algeria) Rédha Bensayah	(Brazil) Isael	(Brazil) Lázaro	(Brazil) Nailson	(Colombia) **Anderson Plata**	(Jordan) **Yazid Abu Layla**	(Algeria) Malik Raiah (Brazil) Carlão (Brazil) **Jô**
Al-Kholood	(Brazil) Roberto Dias	(Brazil) **Jobson**	(Brazil) **Uilliam**	(Iraq) **Jiloan Hamad**	(Iraq) **Ahmed Yasin**	(Tunisia) Khemais Maaouani	(Algeria) Malik Asselah (Brazil) Jhonnattann (Cameroon) Alain Akono (Rwanda) Muhadjiri Hakizimana
Al-Okhdood	(Brazil) Kaká Mendes	(Brazil) Maicon Douglas	(Brazil) Reinaldo Dutra	(Guinea) Ousmane Barry	(Portugal) Vladimir Stojković	(Tunisia) Borhen Hkimi	
Al-Orobah	(Brazil) Tiago Bezerra	(Brazil) Rayllan Bruno	(Brazil) Philipe Maia	(Brazil) Diego Silva	(Lebanon) Mostafa Matar		(Montenegro) Milan Vušurović
Al-Qadsiah	(Algeria) **Karim Aribi**	(Algeria) Raïs M'Bolhi	(Burundi) Cédric Amissi	(Democratic Republic of the Congo) Walter Bwalya	(Ivory Coast) **Soualio Ouattara**	(Tanzania) Saimon Msuva	(Brazil) Bruno Bispo (Madagascar) Ibrahim Amada (Niger) Amadou Moutari
Al-Qaisumah	(Algeria) Achraf Boudrama	(Algeria) Hamid Djaouchi	(Algeria) Khaled Nèche	(Burkina Faso) Souleymane Sakandé	(Nigeria) Odeni George	(Ba'athist Syria) Ward Al Salama	
Al-Riyadh	(Brazil) **Marcinho**	(Brazil) Diego Miranda	(Brazil) Muralha	(Portugal) Emanuel Novo	(Serbia) Miodrag Gemović	(Serbia) Nikola Stojiljković	(Belgium) Jens Cools
Al-Sahel	(Brazil) Rafael Martins	(Gabon) Medwin Biteghé	(Ivory Coast) Ibrahim Diomandé	(Morocco) **Zakaria Lahlali**	(Portugal) Ricardo Machado	(Tunisia) Mourad Hedhli	(Ghana) Lawson Bekui
Al-Shoulla	(Algeria) Sofiane Khedairia	(Brazil) Carlos Henrique	(Democratic Republic of the Congo) **David Molinga**	(Guinea-Bissau) Piqueti	(Ivory Coast) Sylla Daouda	(Morocco) **Taoufik Ijrouten**	(Algeria) Zoubir Motrani (Bosnia and Herzegovina) Mirzad Mehanović
Hajer	(Brazil) Fabrício	(Brazil) Adriano Pardal	(Brazil) Tiago Real	(Cameroon) **Clarence Bitang**	(Democratic Republic of the Congo) **Jean-Marc Mundele**	(Morocco) **Reda Hajhouj**	(Brazil) William Henrique (Mali) Modibo Maïga (Senegal) Souleymane Cissé
Jeddah	(Brazil) Bruno Grassi	(Chad) Othman Maloum	(Egypt) Mohammad Fouad	(England) Gozie Ugwu	(The Gambia) Lamin Samateh	(Netherlands) Johnatan Opoku	
Najran	(Brazil) **Jhonnattann**	(Cameroon) **Alain Akono**	(Guinea) **Mikael Dyrestam**	(Madagascar) Carolus Andria	(Mali) Alassane Diarra	(Panama) **Cristian Martínez**	(Brazil) Coutinho (Brazil) Vitor (Cameroon) Donald Molls (Ghana) Kwame Opoku (Ivory Coast) Soualio Ouattara
Ohod	(Argentina) **Emilio Zelaya**	(Germany) **Reagy Ofosu**	(Morocco) Badr Boulahroud	(Netherlands) **Youssef El Jebli**	(Romania) **Alexandru Răuță**	(Zimbabwe) Gerald Takwara	(Algeria) Adil Djabout (Liberia) Jamal Arago (Morocco) Houssam Amaanan (Senegal) Babacar Guèye

== League table ==
Pos	Team	Pld	W	D	L	GF	GA	GD	Pts	Promotion, qualification or relegation
1	Al-Ahli (C, P)	34	21	9	4	48	24	+24	72	Promotion to the Pro League
2	Al-Hazem (P)	34	20	8	6	55	29	+26	68 (Note: Al-Hazem finished ahead of Al-Okhdood on head-to-head points: Al-Hazem: 6 pts, Al-Okhdood: 0 pts (Al-Hazem 1–0 Al-Okhdood, Al-Okhdood 0–1 Al-Hazem).)	Promotion to the Pro League
3	Al-Okhdood (P)	34	21	5	8	64	35	+29	68	Promotion to the Pro League
4	Al-Riyadh (P)	34	19	6	9	52	37	+15	63	Promotion to the Pro League
5	Al-Faisaly	34	16	10	8	45	32	+13	58	
6	Al-Arabi	34	13	10	11	43	43	0	49	
7	Al-Kholood	34	12	7	15	33	31	+2	43 (Note: Al-Kholood finished ahead of Hajer on overall goal difference: Al-Kholood +2, Hajer −5 (Hajer 1–0 Al-Kholood, Al-Kholood 1–0 Hajer).)	
8	Hajer	34	11	10	13	36	41	−5	43	
9	Ohod	34	10	12	12	29	38	−9	42	
10	Al-Jabalain	34	9	14	11	42	43	−1	41	
11	Al-Qadsiah	34	10	10	14	29	34	−5	40 (Note: Positions determined by head-to-head points: Al-Qadsiah: 9 pts; Al-Orobah: 7 pts; Al-Qaisumah: 1 pts.)	
12	Al-Orobah	34	11	7	16	35	41	−6	40 (Note: Al-Shoulla were awarded a 3–0 win over Al-Orobah due to Al-Orobah's inability to hold the fixture.)	
13	Al-Qaisumah	34	8	16	10	35	44	−9	40	
14	Al-Ain	34	11	6	17	34	46	−12	39	
15	Jeddah	34	10	8	16	34	40	−6	38	
16	Najran (R)	34	9	9	16	36	54	−18	36	Relegation to the Second Division
17	Al-Sahel (R)	34	7	11	16	36	51	−15	32	Relegation to the Second Division
18	Al-Shoulla (R)	34	5	8	21	23	46	−23	23	Relegation to the Second Division

Updated to match(es) played on 29 May 2023. Source: goalzz.com
Rules for classification: 1) Points; 2) Head-to-head points; 3) Head-to-head goal difference; 4) Total goal difference; 5) Total goals scored; 6) Fair-play points (Note: Head-to-head record is used only after all the matches between the teams in question have been played).
(C) Champions; (P) Promoted; (R) Relegated

=== Positions by round ===
The table lists the positions of teams after each week of matches. In order to preserve chronological evolvements, any postponed matches are not included in the round at which they were originally scheduled but added to the full round they were played immediately afterward.

Team ╲ Round	1	2	3	4	5	6	7	8	9	10	11	12	13	14	15	16	17	18	19	20	21	22	23	24	25	26	27	28	29	30	31	32	33	34
Al-Ahli	8	15	11	12	7	7	4	3	5	5	7	9	5	6	6	6	4	1	3	2	2	2	2	1	2	2	1	1	1	1	1	1	1	1
Al-Hazem	5	5	2	2	2	3	3	4	3	3	2	3	4	4	2	2	3	2	2	1	1	1	1	2	1	1	2	3	4	4	3	3	2	2
Al-Okhdood	3	1	1	1	1	1	2	2	2	2	3	1	2	2	3	3	2	3	1	4	4	4	3	3	3	4	3	2	2	2	2	2	3	3
Al-Riyadh	15	16	18	14	12	12	10	12	14	14	12	8	7	5	5	4	5	4	5	3	3	3	4	4	4	3	4	4	3	3	4	4	4	4
Al-Faisaly	4	4	3	3	3	2	1	1	1	1	1	2	1	1	1	1	1	5	4	5	5	6	6	6	6	6	6	5	5	5	5	5	5	5
Al-Arabi	7	7	6	4	5	5	6	5	4	4	4	4	3	3	4	5	6	6	6	6	6	5	5	5	5	5	5	6	6	6	6	6	6	6
Al-Kholood	1	2	5	8	9	11	9	10	12	9	9	13	10	11	11	11	10	8	7	10	8	9	7	7	7	7	7	7	7	7	7	7	7	7
Hajer	6	11	15	16	15	14	12	14	9	10	11	7	11	12	12	12	12	14	10	9	9	7	9	11	9	9	8	8	11	11	9	9	10	8
Ohod	10	10	13	10	13	13	15	11	13	13	15	14	14	14	15	14	15	11	9	8	10	12	11	12	13	13	11	9	8	8	10	10	8	9
Al-Jabalain	9	13	9	6	4	4	5	9	8	8	10	11	12	10	7	9	9	10	13	12	12	13	12	10	8	8	10	10	9	9	8	8	9	10
Al-Qadsiah	16	14	16	17	16	16	17	16	15	16	13	10	13	13	13	13	14	15	15	15	15	15	15	15	15	15	15	15	14	13	14	12	12	11
Al-Orobah	17	18	12	13	14	15	13	15	11	12	8	12	9	9	10	10	11	9	11	13	14	10	10	9	11	10	9	11	10	10	11	11	13	12
Al-Qaisumah	13	8	7	9	6	6	8	8	7	6	6	6	6	7	8	8	8	12	12	11	13	11	13	13	12	11	13	13	13	15	12	13	11	13
Al-Ain	18	17	17	18	18	18	16	17	17	17	17	17	16	16	14	15	13	13	14	14	11	14	14	14	14	14	12	12	12	12	13	14	14	14
Jeddah	14	12	8	7	8	9	11	6	6	7	5	5	8	8	9	7	7	7	8	7	7	8	8	8	10	12	14	14	15	14	15	15	16	15
Najran	11	9	14	15	17	17	18	18	18	18	18	18	18	18	17	16	16	17	17	17	17	17	17	17	16	16	16	16	16	16	16	16	15	16
Al-Sahel	12	6	10	11	11	8	7	7	10	11	14	15	15	15	16	17	17	16	16	16	16	16	16	16	17	17	17	17	17	17	17	17	17	17
Al-Shoulla	2	3	4	5	10	10	14	13	16	15	16	16	17	17	18	18	18	18	18	18	18	18	18	18	18	18	18	18	18	18	18	18	18	18

Leader
Promotion to the Pro League
Relegation to the Second Division

Updated to match(es) played on 29 May 2023. Source:

== Results ==
Home \ Away	AHL	AIN	ARB	FSY	HAZ	JAB	KHO	OKH	ORO	QAD	QAI	RIY	SAH	SHO	HJR	JED	NAJ	OHD
Al-Ahli		1–0	1–2	2–2	1–0	3–0	1–0	1–4	1–0	1–0	1–1	0–2	2–2	2–0	3–1	1–0	2–1	3–0
Al-Ain	0–0		2–0	0–1	0–1	2–0	0–3	1–2	2–2	1–0	0–1	0–2	1–2	3–2	1–2	2–1	0–0	4–1
Al-Arabi	0–0	3–1		0–2	0–1	0–0	2–2	0–2	2–1	2–0	1–1	1–2	2–0	1–0	2–2	0–0	2–1	0–2
Al-Faisaly	1–2	4–1	2–3		3–2	3–1	1–1	1–3	1–2	1–0	1–0	0–1	1–1	1–1	1–0	2–0	2–2	2–0
Al-Hazem	0–0	2–0	3–0	0–1		2–2	1–1	1–0	2–1	1–0	3–0	2–1	3–2	1–1	2–0	2–1	4–1	2–1
Al-Jabalain	1–2	1–2	1–2	1–2	3–1		1–0	2–0	1–3	2–1	3–1	1–4	1–1	0–0	3–1	1–1	1–1	1–0
Al-Kholood	1–2	1–2	1–2	0–1	0–2	1–1		2–1	1–0	2–0	0–1	1–0	0–2	2–0	1–0	1–0	0–1	0–0
Al-Okhdood	2–0	3–1	2–1	2–1	0–1	0–0	1–1		4–2	0–0	3–1	1–2	2–1	1–0	2–1	3–2	4–1	1–0
Al-Orobah	0–0	2–1	1–3	0–1	0–2	2–2	2–1	1–0		0–1	1–1	0–1	0–0	2–0	0–1	1–0	1–0	0–0
Al-Qadsiah	1–1	0–1	3–2	0–0	1–1	1–0	1–0	1–3	1–2		1–0	1–1	1–1	1–1	1–1	0–0	1–2	3–0
Al-Qaisumah	0–2	0–0	2–2	1–1	1–1	2–2	0–2	2–2	1–4	0–1		1–1	0–0	1–0	2–2	2–1	2–1	2–0
Al-Riyadh	0–2	3–0	3–3	1–2	0–0	0–0	1–1	0–3	1–0	1–2	2–1		1–2	1–3	2–1	2–1	3–2	2–1
Al-Sahel	1–3	2–1	0–1	1–1	2–3	0–0	0–3	3–2	0–2	1–2	1–2	1–3		1–1	1–2	0–1	3–2	1–1
Al-Shoulla	0–1	0–1	2–0	1–0	0–0	0–5	0–1	1–2	3–0	0–2	0–1	0–3	0–1		1–2	1–2	1–3	1–2
Hajer	1–2	1–2	1–1	1–0	3–2	0–0	1–0	1–0	2–2	2–0	2–2	0–1	1–1	0–1		1–0	1–1	1–0
Jeddah	1–1	2–2	0–2	2–2	1–3	2–0	0–1	2–4	1–0	2–1	1–1	2–0	2–0	1–0	2–1		2–0	0–0
Najran	0–2	0–0	1–0	0–1	0–3	1–3	2–1	0–4	2–1	1–1	1–1	1–2	3–2	1–1	2–0	1–0		0–2
Ohod	0–2	1–0	1–1	0–0	2–1	2–2	2–1	1–1	2–0	1–0	1–1	1–3	1–0	1–1	0–0	2–1	1–1	

Updated to match(es) played on 29 May 2023. Source: goalzz.com
Legend: Blue = home team win; Yellow = draw; Red = away team win.

== Statistics ==
As of 29 May 2023

=== Scoring ===
==== Top scorers ====
Rank	Player	Club	Goals
1	(Senegal) Ablaye Mbengue	Al-Arabi	29
2	(Guinea) Ousmane Barry	Al-Okhdood	22
3	(Brazil) Tiago Bezerra	Al-Orobah	21
4	(Netherlands) Ola John	Al-Hazem	18
4	(Serbia) Nikola Stojiljković	Al-Riyadh	18
6	(Algeria) Lahouari Touil	Al-Ain	13
7	(Brazil) Adriano Pardal	Hajer	12
8	(Ivory Coast) Ibrahim Diomandé	Al-Sahel	11
8	(Cameroon) Alain Akono	Al-Kholood/Najran	11
10	(Brazil) Muralha	Al-Riyadh	10
10	(Saudi Arabia) Haitham Asiri	Al-Ahli	10
10	(Tunisia) Borhen Hkimi	Al-Okhdood	10

==== Hat-tricks ====
Player	For	Against	Result	Date	Ref.
(Guinea) Ousmane Barry	Al-Okhdood	Al-Qadsiah	3–1 (A)	23 August 2022	
(Senegal) Ablaye Mbengue	Al-Arabi	Al-Orobah	3–1 (A)	18 October 2022	
(Brazil) Muralha	Al-Riyadh	Al-Jabalain	4–1 (A)	7 November 2022	
(Serbia) Nikola Stojiljković	Al-Riyadh	Al-Sahel	3–1 (A)	20 December 2022	
(Algeria) Rédha Bensayah	Al-Jabalain	Al-Shoulla	5–0 (A)	28 December 2022	
(Brazil) Tiago Bezerra	Al-Orobah	Al-Qaisumah	4–1 (A)	3 April 2023	

Note

(H) – Home; (A) – Away

=== Clean sheets ===
Rank	Player	Club	Clean sheets
1	(Saudi Arabia) Mohammed Al-Rubaie	Al-Ahli	14
2	(Saudi Arabia) Ahmed Al-Kassar	Al-Faisaly	13
2	(Saudi Arabia) Ibrahim Zaid	Al-Hazem	13
4	(Portugal) Emanuel Novo	Al-Riyadh	10
4	(Algeria) Raïs M'Bolhi	Al-Qadsiah	10
4	(Saudi Arabia) Salem Qabbos	Ohod	10
7	(Saudi Arabia) Jassem Al-Ashban	Al-Kholood	9
7	(Brazil) Bruno Grassi	Jeddah	9
9	(Portugal) Vladimir Stojković	Al-Okhdood	8
9	(Saudi Arabia) Abdulraouf Al-Daqeel	Hajer	8

== Awards ==
=== Monthly awards ===
Month	Manager of the Month		Reference
Month	Manager	Club	Reference
August & September	(Portugal) Jorge Mendonça	Al-Okhdood	
October	(Croatia) Ante Miše	Al-Faisaly	
November	(Tunisia) Habib Ben Romdhane	Al-Qadsiah	
December	(Croatia) Damir Burić	Al-Riyadh	
January	(Croatia) Damir Burić	Al-Riyadh	
February	(South Africa) Pitso Mosimane	Al-Ahli	
April	(North Macedonia) Gjoko Hadžievski	Najran	
May	(South Africa) Pitso Mosimane	Al-Ahli	

=== Round awards ===
Round	Player of the Round		Reference
Round	Player	Club	Reference
Round 1	(Guinea) Ousmane Barry	Al-Okhdood	
Round 2	(Saudi Arabia) Abdullah Al-Dawsari	Al-Sahel	
Round 3	(Brazil) Tiago Bezerra	Al-Orobah	
Round 4	(Brazil) Nailson	Al-Jabalain	
Round 5	(Brazil) Carlão	Al-Jabalain	
Round 6	(Brazil) Adriano Pardal	Hajer	
Round 7	(Brazil) Tiago Bezerra	Al-Orobah	
Round 8	(Senegal) Ablaye Mbengue	Al-Arabi	
Round 9	(Brazil) Adriano Pardal	Hajer	
Round 10	(Guinea) Ousmane Barry	Al-Okhdood	
Round 11	(Brazil) Muralha	Al-Riyadh	
Round 12	(Saudi Arabia) Salem Qabbos	Ohod	
Round 13	(Serbia) Nikola Stojiljković	Al-Riyadh	
Round 14	(Algeria) Rédha Bensayah	Al-Jabalain	
Round 15	(Netherlands) Ola John	Al-Hazem	
Round 16	(Brazil) Diego Miranda	Al-Riyadh	
Round 17	(Saudi Arabia) Saleh Al-Harthi	Al-Okhdood	
Round 18	(Egypt) Youssef Obama	Al-Hazem	
Round 19	(Guinea) Ousmane Barry	Al-Okhdood	
Round 20	(Cameroon) Joel Tagueu	Al-Hazem	
Round 21	(Algeria) Lahouari Touil	Al-Ain	
Round 22	(Brazil) Tiago Bezerra	Al-Orobah	
Round 23	(Democratic Republic of the Congo) Walter Bwalya	Al-Qadsiah	
Round 24	(Brazil) Uilliam	Al-Kholood	
Round 25	(Saudi Arabia) Mohammed Al-Harthi	Al-Qaisumah	
Round 26	(Algeria) Lahouari Touil	Al-Ain	
Round 27	(Brazil) Tiago Bezerra	Al-Orobah	
Round 28	(Kenya) Masoud Juma	Al-Faisaly	
Round 29	(Brazil) Reinaldo Dutra	Al-Okhdood	
Round 30	(Algeria) Karim Aribi	Al-Qadsiah	
Round 31	(Serbia) Miodrag Gemović	Al-Riyadh	
Round 32	(Netherlands) Ola John	Al-Hazem	
Round 33	(Cameroon) Alain Akono	Najran	
Round 34	(Brazil) Tiago Bezerra	Al-Orobah	

=== Annual awards ===
Award	Winner	Club
Manager of the Season	(Portugal) Filipe Gouveia	Al-Hazem
Player of the Season	(Guinea) Ousmane Barry	Al-Okhdood
Young Player of the Season	(Saudi Arabia) Eid Al-Muwallad	Al-Okhdood
Top Scorer	(Senegal) Ablaye Mbengue	Al-Arabi
Best Goalkeeper	(Saudi Arabia) Salem Qabbos	Ohod

== See also ==
- 2022–23 Saudi Professional League
- 2022–23 Saudi Second Division
- 2022–23 Saudi Third Division
