= Haythem Mhamdi =

Tunisian footballer (born 1989)

Personal information
- Date of birth: 7 February 1989 (age 37)
- Place of birth: Tunisia
- Height: 1.85 m (6 ft 1 in)
- Position: Midfielder

Team information
- Current team: Al-Akhdar

Youth career
- EGS Gafsa

Senior career*
Years	Team	Apps	(Gls)
2011–2016	EGS Gafsa	97	(5)
2016–2018	ES Métlaoui	81	(4)
2020–2021	Al-Sahel	36	(0)
2021–2022	Olympique Béja	4	(0)
2022	Al-Safa		
2022–2023	Jerash		
2023–	Al-Akhdar		
- * Club domestic league appearances and goals

Haythem Mhamdi (born 7 February 1989) is a Tunisian professional footballer who plays for gafsa as a midfielder.
