= Modibo Maïga =

Malian footballer (born 1987)

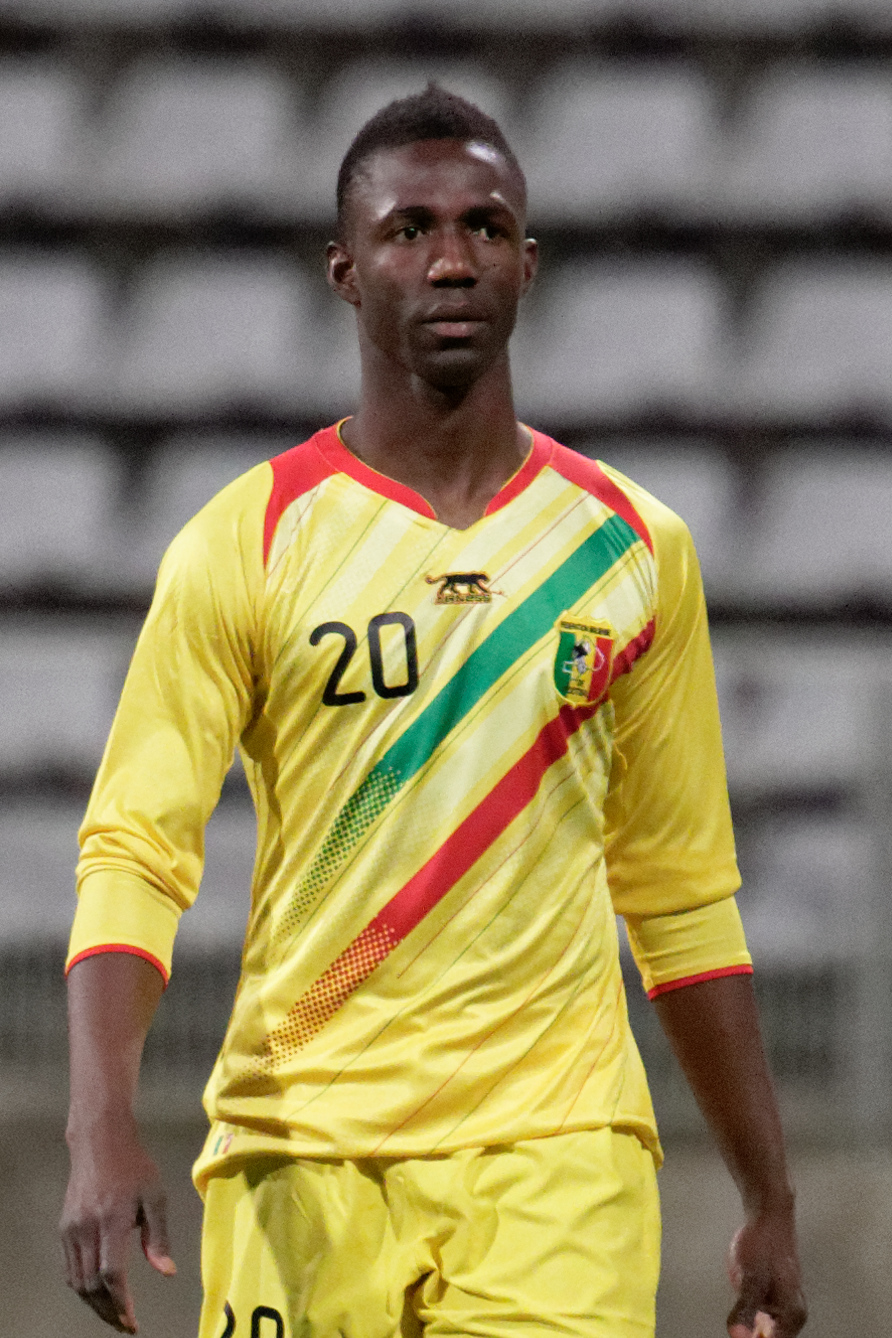
- Maïga with Mali in 2015

Personal information
- Full name: Modibo Maïga
- Date of birth: 3 September 1987 (age 39)
- Place of birth: Bamako, Mali
- Height: 1.85 m (6 ft 1 in)
- Positions: Striker; winger

Youth career
- AS Bamako
- 2000–2002: Stade Malien

Senior career*
| Years | Team | Apps | (Gls) |
| 2003 | Stade Malien | 3 | (1) |
| 2004–2006 | Raja Casablanca | 47 | (12) |
| 2007–2010 | Le Mans | 88 | (15) |
| 2010–2012 | Sochaux | 59 | (24) |
| 2011 | Sochaux B | 1 | (2) |
| 2012–2015 | West Ham United | 34 | (4) |
| 2014 | → Queens Park Rangers (loan) | 8 | (1) |
| 2014–2015 | → Metz (loan) | 25 | (9) |
| 2015–2016 | Al-Nassr | 19 | (5) |
| 2016–2017 | Al-Ittihad Kalba | 23 | (9) |
| 2017–2018 | Ajman | 19 | (10) |
| 2019 | Buriram United | 3 | (1) |
| 2021 | Ajman | 14 | (4) |
| 2021–2023 | Hajer | 49 | (17) |
| 2023 | Al-Jeel | | |

International career^{‡}
| 2007–2016 | Mali | 59 | (13) |
Medal record
Men's football
Representing Mali
Africa Cup of Nations
| Third place | 2012 Eguatorial Guinea-Gabon |
| Third place | 2013 South Africa |
- * Club domestic league appearances and goals as of 03:48, 13 April 2019 (UTC) ‡ National team caps and goals as of 21 September 2017

Modibo Maïga (born 3 September 1987) is a Malian professional footballer who plays as a striker.

A full international for Mali since 2007, he was part of their squads at the four Africa Cup of Nations tournaments, helping them to third place in the 2012 and 2013 editions.

== Club career ==
=== Raja Casablanca ===
Born in Bamako, Maïga began his career with Stade Malien in his home country aged 15 in 2003, later moving to Moroccan club Raja CA Casablanca where he spent his late teenage years, winning several competitions, including the Arab Champions League and the Moroccan League.

=== Le Mans ===
Maïga made a move to French Ligue 1 side Le Mans aged 20 in 2007. Playing alongside Gervinho and Stéphane Sessègnon, Maïga established himself in French football. Despite Le Mans' relegation to Ligue 2, Maïga scored 15 goals in 88 games. He signed a four-year contract in 2010 with Sochaux and took the number 15 shirt.

=== Sochaux ===
During the 2010–11 campaign, Maïga struck up a 30-goal partnership with Brown Ideye, each scoring 15 goals. Between them, they scored over half of Sochaux's league goals. Maïga and Brown were assisted by playmaking duo Marvin Martin and Ryad Boudebouz as Sochaux qualified for the 2011–12 UEFA Europa League.

On 12 August 2011, Maïga announced to his club that he would never again play for Sochaux because he wanted a transfer to Newcastle United. He refused to play against Caen and Nancy, but opted to play against Metalist Kharkiv and Lorient. He and teammate Kévin Anin were refused a move away from the club and were later criticised by supporters, who temporarily withdrew their support in response to poor performances and the attitude of Anin and Maïga.

On 18 October, several newspapers, including The Daily Telegraph and L'Equipe, reported that Maïga was close to a deal to move to Newcastle in the January 2012 transfer window and on 13 December, it was reported that he had passed a medical in London ahead of his move, with the transfer fee believed to be in the region of £7 million. On 16 December, however, L'Equipe reported that Maïga had failed his medical with Newcastle.

=== West Ham United ===
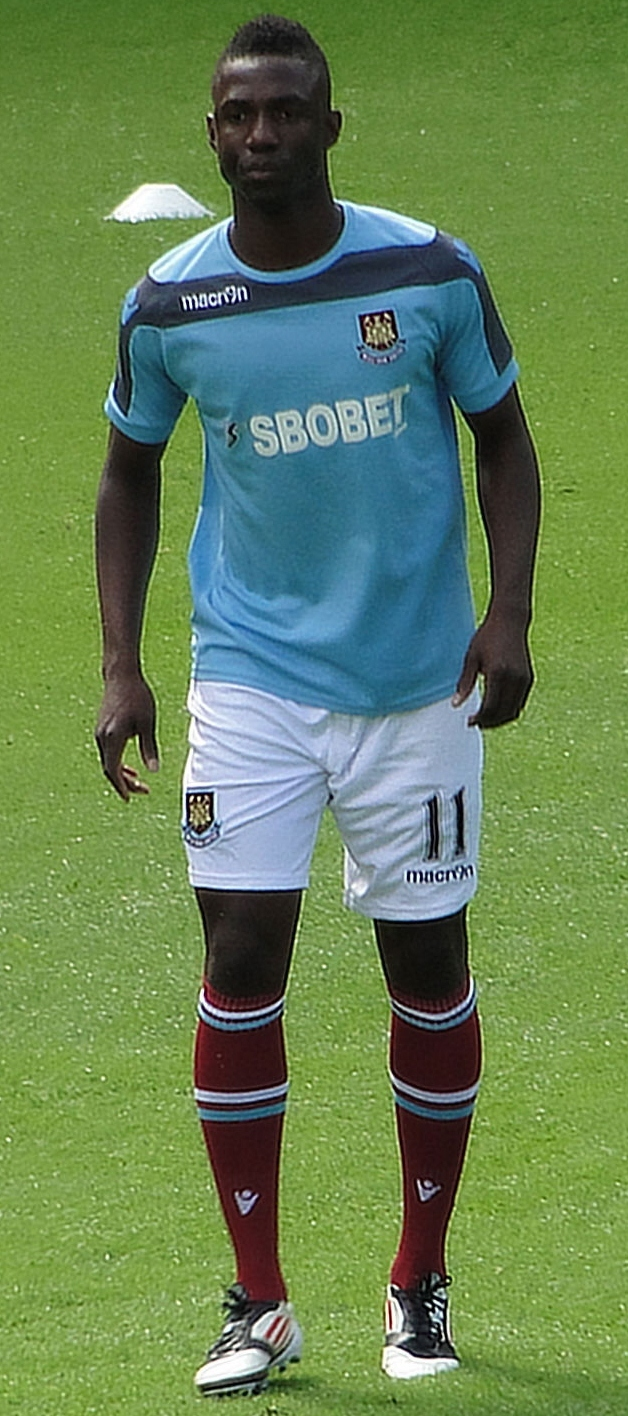
Maïga with West Ham United

On 18 July 2012, after playing out the remainder of the 2011–12 season with Sochaux, Maïga signed on a four-year contract with an option for a further two years, at an undisclosed fee. Maïga made his debut for West Ham on 18 August 2012, coming on as an 81st-minute substitute for Carlton Cole in a 1–0 home win against Aston Villa.

On 28 August, Maïga scored on his full home debut against Crewe Alexandra in the second round of the League Cup to make the score 2–0 following Nicky Maynard's opening goal. He scored his first league goal on 20 October against Southampton in a 4–1 win at Upton Park. His only other league goals for West Ham in his first two seasons with the club came in a 3–1 win against Chelsea—West Ham's first against the club since 2003, on 1 December 2012—and in a 3–3 draw with West Bromwich Albion, with a 20-yard shot on 20 December 2013. On 18 December 2013, Maïga scored the winning goal for West Ham in a 2–1 away win against rivals Tottenham Hotspur in the League Cup, marking his first goal in over a year for the club. His form brought criticism from some West Ham supporters but he was defended and praised for his most recent efforts by then-manager Sam Allardyce.

He returned to the West Ham squad from his season-long loan with Metz for the beginning of the 2015–16 season. He played in four of West Ham's six 2015–16 Europa League qualifying games, against Birkirkara and Astra Giurgiu, without scoring. On 9 August, he played in his first Premier League game of the season, coming on as a 90th-minute substitute for Diafra Sakho in a 2–0 away win against Arsenal. In the third Premier League game of the season, on 22 August against AFC Bournemouth, Maïga scored West Ham's third goal in a 3–4 defeat in what was to be his last game for the club.

==== Queens Park Rangers (loan) ====
On 31 January 2014, Maïga joined Queens Park Rangers on loan for the remainder of the 2013–14 season. He made his debut on 1 February in a draw against Burnley. Coming on as a 68th-minute substitute for Andrew Johnson, Maïga scored in the 79th minute to make the score 3–3, the final score. It was his only goal for QPR.

==== Metz (loan) ====
In August 2014, Maïga joined French club Metz on a season-long loan with an option to make the loan a permanent transfer in the summer of 2015. He scored his debut goals for Metz on 1 November, scoring twice in a 3–2 home win against Caen. On 4 April 2015, Maïga scored a hat-trick for Metz as they defeated Toulouse 3–2. Maïga scored nine league goals in 25 games for Metz whilst on loan, while they finished 19th in Ligue 1 and were relegated to Ligue 2.

=== Al-Nassr ===
In August 2015, Maïga signed a two-year contract for Saudi Arabian club Al-Nassr for an undisclosed fee.

=== Al-Ittihad Kalba ===
In October 2016, Maïga signed for UAE Arabian Gulf League club Al-Ittihad Kalba after his release from Al-Nassr in July 2016.

=== Ajman Club ===
In September 2017, Maïga signed for UAE Arabian Gulf League club Ajman for a free transfer.

=== Hajer ===
On 3 September 2021, Maïga joined Saudi club Hajer. On 23 January 2023, Maïga was released from his contract.

=== Al-Jeel ===
On 24 January 2023, Maïga joined Saudi club Al-Jeel.

== International career ==
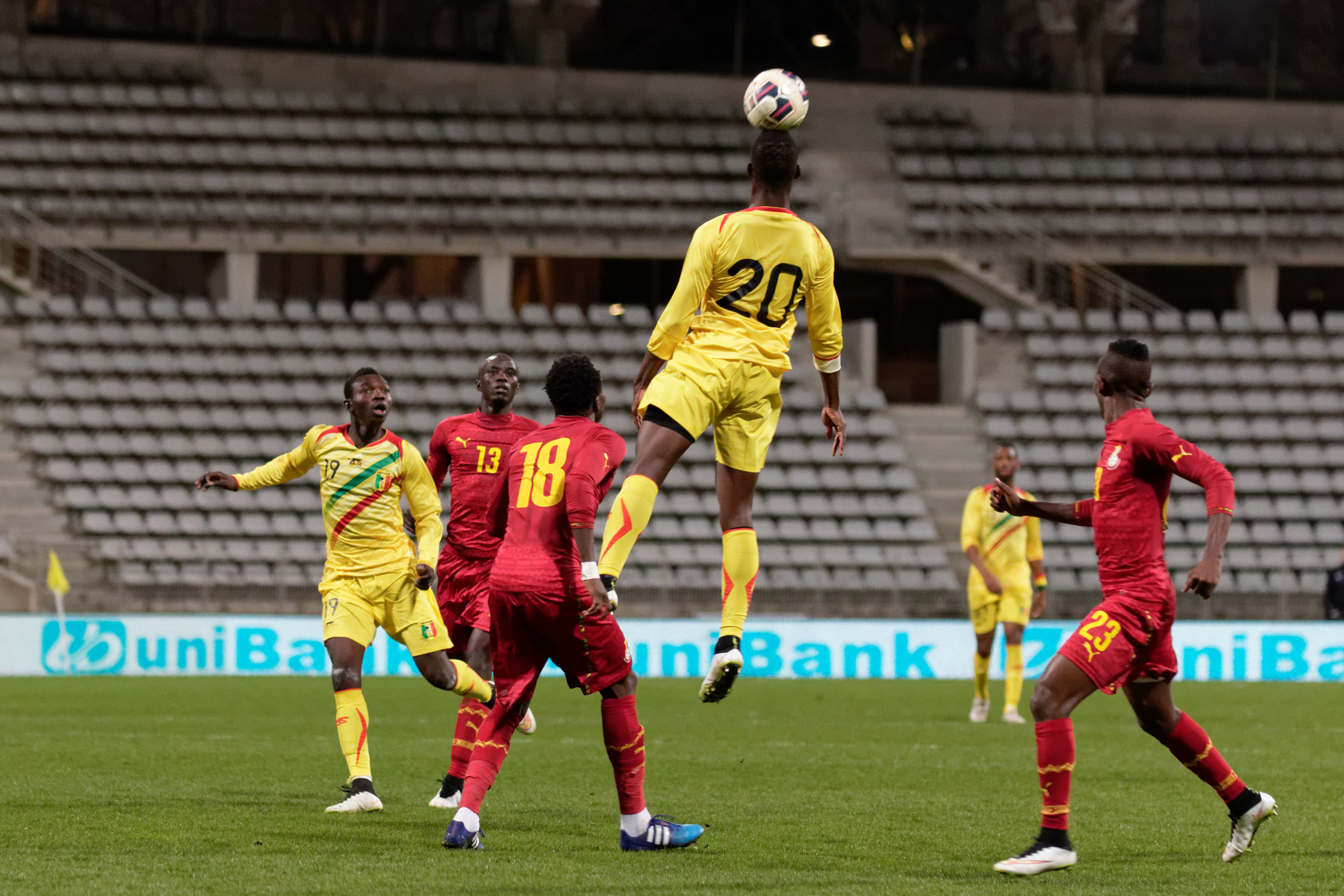
Maïga rising for a header in a friendly against Ghana, 31 March 2015

Maïga plays for Mali, making his debut on 17 November 2007 in a 2–3 friendly defeat to Senegal at the Stade Olympique Yves-du-Manoir in Colombes, France, as a 59th-minute substitute for Souleymane Dembélé. His first goal came on 21 June 2009 in World Cup qualification, equalising in a 3–1 victory over Benin at the Stade du 26 Mars in Bamako. He wore the number 10 shirt at the 2010 Africa Cup of Nations, playing all three games of a group stage elimination in Angola.

He was called up again to the Mali squad for 2012 Africa Cup of Nations, but in February 2012 whilst in Gabon participating in the competition, he contracted malaria and was hospitalized in Libreville. He missed the remainder of the tournament, in which his nation came third. The following year, he again helped the team to the same position in the tournament.

At the 2015 Africa Cup of Nations in Equatorial Guinea, Maïga headed the equaliser in a 1–1 draw against Guinea in the final Group D game, but the opponents advanced on draw of lots.

== Career statistics ==
=== Club ===
As of 11 May 2021.

| Club | Season | League | | | National Cup | | League Cup | | Continental | | Other | | Total | |
| Club | Season | Division | Apps | Goals | Apps | Goals | Apps | Goals | Apps | Goals | Apps | Goals | Apps | Goals |
|---|---|---|---|---|---|---|---|---|---|---|---|---|---|---|
| Le Mans | 2007–08 | Ligue 1 | 19 | 0 | 2 | 0 | 1 | 0 | — | | — | | 22 | 0 |
| Le Mans | 2008–09 | Ligue 1 | 37 | 8 | 3 | 0 | 1 | 0 | — | | — | | 41 | 8 |
| Le Mans | 2009–10 | Ligue 1 | 32 | 7 | 1 | 0 | 2 | 0 | — | | — | | 35 | 7 |
| Le Mans | Total | | 88 | 15 | 6 | 0 | 4 | 0 | 0 | 0 | 0 | 0 | 98 | 15 |
| Sochaux | 2010–11 | Ligue 1 | 36 | 15 | 2 | 1 | 1 | 0 | — | | — | | 39 | 16 |
| Sochaux | 2011–12 | Ligue 1 | 23 | 9 | 1 | 0 | 0 | 0 | 1 (Note: Appearances in UEFA Europa League) | 0 | — | | 25 | 9 |
| Sochaux | Total | | 59 | 24 | 3 | 1 | 1 | 0 | 1 | 0 | 0 | 0 | 64 | 25 |
| West Ham United | 2012–13 | Premier League | 17 | 2 | 0 | 0 | 2 | 2 | — | | — | | 19 | 4 |
| West Ham United | 2013–14 | Premier League | 14 | 1 | 1 | 0 | 4 | 1 | — | | — | | 19 | 2 |
| West Ham United | 2015–16 | Premier League | 3 | 1 | 0 | 0 | 0 | 0 | 4 | 0 | — | | 7 | 1 |
| West Ham United | Total | | 34 | 4 | 1 | 0 | 6 | 3 | 4 | 0 | 0 | 0 | 45 | 7 |
| Queens Park Rangers (loan) | 2013–14 | Championship | 8 | 1 | 0 | 0 | 0 | 0 | — | | — | | 8 | 1 |
| Metz (loan) | 2014–15 | Ligue 1 | 25 | 9 | 0 | 0 | 1 | 0 | — | | — | | 26 | 9 |
| Al Nassr | 2015–16 | Saudi Pro League | 19 | 5 | 4 | 2 | — | | 5 (Note: Appearances in AFC Champions League) | 1 | 2 | 3 | 30 | 11 |
| Ittihad Kalba | 2016–17 | UAE Pro League | 23 | 9 | 1 | 0 | 1 | 0 | — | | — | | 25 | 9 |
| Ajman | 2017–18 | UAE Pro League | 19 | 10 | 1 | 0 | 3 | 0 | — | | — | | 23 | 10 |
| Buriram United | 2019 | Thai League 1 | 3 | 1 | 0 | 0 | 0 | 0 | 2 | 0 | — | | 5 | 1 |
| Ajman | 2020–21 | UAE Pro League | 14 | 4 | 0 | 0 | 0 | 0 | — | | — | | 14 | 4 |
| Hajer | 2021–22 | First Division League | 0 | 0 | — | | — | | — | | — | | 0 | 0 |
| Hajer | 2022–23 | First Division League | 0 | 0 | — | | — | | — | | — | | 0 | 0 |
| Hajer | Total | | 0 | 0 | 0 | 0 | 0 | 0 | 0 | 0 | 0 | 0 | 0 | 0 |
| Al-Jeel | 2022–23 | Second Division League | 0 | 0 | — | | — | | — | | — | | 0 | 0 |
| Career total | | | 292 | 83 | 16 | 3 | 16 | 3 | 12 | 1 | 2 | 3 | 338 | 92 |

=== International ===
As of 4 June 2016

Appearances and goals by national team and year
| National team | Year | Apps | Goals |
|---|---|---|---|
| Mali | 2007 | 2 | 0 |
| Mali | 2008 | 2 | 1 |
| Mali | 2009 | 8 | 2 |
| Mali | 2010 | 9 | 1 |
| Mali | 2011 | 4 | 1 |
| Mali | 2012 | 8 | 3 |
| Mali | 2013 | 5 | 1 |
| Mali | 2014 | 0 | 0 |
| Mali | 2015 | 11 | 3 |
| Mali | 2016 | 8 | 1 |
| Mali | Total | 57 | 13 |

As of match played 4 June 2016. Mali score listed first, score column indicates score after each Maïga goal.

International goals by date, venue, cap, opponent, score, result and competition
| No. | Date | Venue | Cap | Opponent | Score | Result | Competition |
|---|---|---|---|---|---|---|---|
| 1 | 25 March 2008 | Stade Sébastien Charléty, Paris, France | 3 | France B | 2–0 | 2–3 | Friendly |
| 2 | 21 June 2009 | Stade du 26 Mars, Bamako, Mali | 10 | Benin | 1–1 | 3–1 | 2010 FIFA World Cup qualification |
| 3 | 12 August 2009 | Amable-et-Micheline-Lozai Stadium, Le Petit-Quevilly, France | 11 | Burkina Faso | 2–0 | 3–0 | Friendly |
| 4 | 17 November 2010 | Stade Roger Rochard, Évreux, France | 24 | DR Congo | 1–1 | 3–1 | Friendly |
| 5 | 10 August 2011 | Stade Mustapha Ben Jannet, Monastir, Tunisia | 28 | Tunisia | 1–2 | 2–4 | Friendly |
| 6 | 10 June 2012 | Stade du 4 Août, Ouagadougou, Burkina Faso | 35 | Algeria | 2–1 | 2–1 | 2014 FIFA World Cup qualification |
| 7 | 8 September 2012 | Stade du 26 Mars, Bamako, Mali | 36 | Botswana | 3–0 | 3–0 | 2013 Africa Cup of Nations qualification |
| 8 | 13 October 2012 | Lobatse Stadium, Lobatse, Botswana | 37 | Botswana | 2–0 | 4–1 | 2013 Africa Cup of Nations qualification |
| 9 | 15 October 2013 | Cheonan Stadium, Cheonan, South Korea | 42 | South Korea | 1–0 | 1–3 | Friendly |
| 10 | 28 January 2015 | Estadio de Mongomo, Mongomo, Equatorial Guinea | 46 | Guinea | 1–1 | 1–1 | 2015 Africa Cup of Nations |
| 11 | 13 June 2015 | Stade du 26 Mars, Bamako, Mali | 50 | South Sudan | 1–0 | 2–0 | 2017 Africa Cup of Nations qualification |
| 12 | 9 October 2015 | Stade de l'Aube, Troyes, France | 52 | Burkina Faso | 3–1 | 4–1 | Friendly |
| 13 | 4 June 2016 | Juba Stadium, Juba, South Sudan | 57 | South Sudan | 2–0 | 3–0 | 2017 Africa Cup of Nations qualification |

== Honours ==
Mali

- Africa Cup of Nations bronze: 2012; 2013
