= Achraf Ben Dhiaf =

Tunisian footballer

Personal information
- Full name: Achraf Ben Dhiaf
- Date of birth: 21 May 1995 (age 31)
- Place of birth: Tunisia
- Position: Midfielder

Team information
- Current team: Mudhar
- Number: 10

Youth career
- Stade Tunisien

Senior career*
Years	Team	Apps	(Gls)
2013–2018	Stade Tunisien	38	(1)
2017–2018	→ CO Médenine (loan)	7	(0)
2018–2020	ES Zarzis		
2020–2021	Wej		
2021	US Tataouine	10	(1)
2021–2022	Wej		
2022–2024	Al-Nairyah		
2024–	Mudhar		
- * Club domestic league appearances and goals

Achraf Ben Dhiaf (born 21 May 1995) is a Tunisian footballer who plays for Mudhar as a midfielder.

On 16 January 2024, Ben Dhiaf joined Saudi club Mudhar.
