= Anis Khedher =

Tunisian footballer

Personal information
- Full name: Anis Khedher
- Date of birth: 19 September 1991 (age 35)
- Place of birth: Sousse, Tunisia
- Position: Midfielder

Team information
- Current team: US Ben Guerdane

Senior career*
Years	Team	Apps	(Gls)
2011–2012	ES Zarzis	4	(0)
2012	AS Djerba		
2012–2014	LPS Tozeur		
2014–2016	ES Hammam-Sousse		
2016	Olympique du Kef		
2016–2018	FC Hammamet		
2018–2019	Sfax Railways Sports		
2019–2022	AS Rejiche		
2022–2023	Qilwah		
2023–2023	Al-Entesar		
2023–	US Ben Guerdane		
- * Club domestic league appearances and goals

Anis Khedher (born 19 September 1991) is a Tunisian football midfielder who currently plays for Al-Entesar.
