= Riadh Frioui =

Tunisian footballer

Personal information
- Date of birth: 29 July 1997 (age 29)
- Position: Midfielder

Team information
- Current team: US Monastir

Senior career*
Years	Team	Apps	(Gls)
2015–2020	JS Kairouan	63	(2)
2020–2023	ES Métlaoui	42	(5)
2023–2024	Al-Qous		
2024–	US Monastir	0	(0)
- * Club domestic league appearances and goals

Riadh Frioui (born 29 July 1997) is a Tunisian football midfielder who currently plays for US Monastir.

On 17 July 2024, Frioui joined US Monastir.
