= Sabri Ameri =

Tunisian footballer (born 1993)

Personal information
- Date of birth: 31 January 1993 (age 33)
- Height: 1.78 m (5 ft 10 in)
- Position: Midfielder

Team information
- Current team: JS Kairouan
- Number: 6

Senior career*
Years	Team	Apps	(Gls)
2013–2018	JS Kairouan	95	(6)
2018–2020	Club Africain	0	(0)
2018–2020	→ US Ben Guerdane (loan)	42	(2)
2020–2022	Stade Tunisien	20	(0)
2022–2023	Bisha		
2023–2025	Al-Rayyan		
2025–2026	Al-Safa		
2026-	JS Kairouan		
- * Club domestic league appearances and goals as of September 3rd 2026

Sabri Ameri (born 31 January 1993), also known as Sabri Ammary, is a Tunisian football midfielder who currently plays for Tunisian club JS Kairouan.

== Career ==
On 25 August 2022, Ameri joined Saudi Arabian club Bisha.

On 29 June 2023, Ameri joined Saudi Arabian club Al-Rayyan.

On 2 October 2025, Ameri joined Al-Safa.
