= Mohammad Fouad Abdulhamid =

Egyptian footballer (born 1989)

Mohammad Fouad محمد فؤاد
Personal information
- Full name: Mohammad Fouad Abdulhamid
- Date of birth: September 2, 1989 (age 37)
- Place of birth: Saudi Arabia
- Position: Winger

Team information
- Current team: Al-Entesar
- Number: 11

Senior career*
Years	Team	Apps	(Gls)
2010–2012	Baladeyet El Mahalla	-	(-)
2012–2013	Al Aluminium	-	(-)
2013–2015	Al-Rustaq	-	(21)
2015–2016	Al-Batin	23	(7)
2017	Al-Rustaq	-	(0)
2017–2018	Damac	23	(2)
2018–2019	Al-Nahda	32	(7)
2019–2021	Al-Ain	51	(10)
2021–2022	Pharco	4	(0)
2022–2023	Jeddah	44	(16)
2023–2024	Neom	27	(10)
2024–	Al-Entesar	0	(0)
- * Club domestic league appearances and goals

Mohammad Fouad Abdulhamid (Arabic: محمد فؤاد عبد الحميد, born 2 September 1989) is an Egyptian professional footballer born in Saudi Arabia who plays for Al-Entesar as a winger.

On 3 July 2023, Abdulhamid joined Neom.

== Honours ==
Al-Batin

- First Division runners-up: 2015–16 (promotion to Pro League)

Al-Ain

- First Division third place: 2019–20 (promotion to Pro League)

Neom

- Saudi Second Division League: 2023–24
