= Adriano Pardal =

Brazilian footballer (born 1987)

Personal information
- Full name: Antonio Adriano Antunes de Paula
- Date of birth: 13 June 1987 (age 39)
- Place of birth: Juazeiro, Brazil
- Height: 1.75 m (5 ft 9 in)
- Position: Winger

Senior career*
Years	Team	Apps	(Gls)
2006	Vitória		
2006	Juazeiro		
2007–2008	Vitória		(2)
2009	Botafogo-SP	8	(2)
2009–2011	Vitória	14	(1)
2010	→ Botafogo-SP (loan)	13	(1)
2010	→ Caxias (loan)	4	(0)
2012	ABC	35	(12)
2012	Daegu	9	(0)
2013	Ceará	5	(0)
2013–2014	América-RN	43	(16)
2014–2015	Al-Faisaly	7	(3)
2015	América-RN	15	(5)
2016	Al-Faisaly	12	(3)
2017	ABC	13	(3)
2018–2019	América-RN		
2019–2024	Hajer	129	(52)
- * Club domestic league appearances and goals as of 4 April 2023

Adriano Adriano Antunes de Paula (born 13 June 1987), simply known as Adriano Pardal, is a Brazilian professional footballer who plays as a forward.
