= Konan Ahuie =

Ivorian footballer (born 1994)

Personal information
- Full name: Konan Ahuie
- Date of birth: 12 June 1994 (age 32)
- Place of birth: Adzopé, Ivory Coast
- Height: 1.84 m (6 ft 1/2 in)
- Position: Defender

Youth career
- Egnanda de Zaranou

Senior career*
Years	Team	Apps	(Gls)
2016–2018	Slutsk	57	(3)
2020–2021	Issia Wazy		
2021–2022	Al Sadaqa		
2022–2023	Al-Entesar		
2024–2025	Al-Yarmouk		
- * Club domestic league appearances and goals as of 10 December 2018

Konan Ahuie (born 12 June 1994) is an Ivorian footballer who plays as a defender.
