= Vanílson =

Brazilian footballer

Personal information
- Full name: Vanílson de Lima Silva
- Date of birth: 26 August 1990 (age 36)
- Place of birth: Goiânia, Brazil
- Height: 1.90 m (6 ft 3 in)
- Position: Forward

Senior career*
Years	Team	Apps	(Gls)
2009	Aracati	0	(0)
2009	Paracuru	0	(0)
2011	Porto Alegre	9	(0)
2011–2012	Olaria	5	(0)
2012	Náutico-RR	0	(0)
2012–2013	Francana	12	(1)
2013	Náutico-RR	4	(2)
2013	Manaus	3	(1)
2014	Francana	10	(2)
2015–2016	Vila Nova	7	(0)
2017	Itumbiara	13	(3)
2018	Grêmio Anápolis	0	(0)
2018	→ C.D. Nacional (loan)	17	(2)
2019	Atlético Cearense	0	(0)
2020	São Raimundo-RR	1	(0)
2020	Goianésia	22	(11)
2021	Manaus	18	(14)
2021–2022	Arar	16	(15)
2022	Remo	18	(3)
2022–2023	Jerash	23	(15)
2023–2024	Al-Zulfi		
2024–2025	Al-Hada		
- * Club domestic league appearances and goals as of 12 April 2022

Vanílson de Lima Silva (born 26 August 1990), or simply Vanílson, is a Brazilian footballer who plays as a forward.

== Honours ==
Náutico-RR

- Campeonato Roraimense: 2012, 2013

Manaus

- Campeonato Amazonense: 2021
- Campeonato Amazonense Second Division: 2013

Vila Nova

- Campeonato Brasileiro Série C: 2015
- Campeonato Goiano Second Division: 2015

C.D. Nacional

- Liga Portugal 2: 2017–18
