= Tiago Bezerra =

Brazilian footballer

Personal information
- Full name: Tiago Queiroz Bezerra
- Date of birth: 17 February 1987 (age 39)
- Place of birth: Brasília, DF, Brazil
- Position: Forward

Team information
- Current team: Al-Anwar
- Number: 9

Senior career*
Years	Team	Apps	(Gls)
2005–2006	La Louvière	7	(0)
2008–2010	Altay	61	(27)
2010–2011	Karşıyaka	29	(10)
2011–2012	CRB	9	(0)
2013–2015	Adanaspor	61	(31)
2015	Al-Arabi	7	(8)
2016	Adana Demirspor	18	(3)
2016–2017	Al-Qadisiyah FC	11	(1)
2017–2017	Adana Demirspor	14	(4)
2017–2019	Pakhtakor	44	(21)
2019–2020	Al-Khor	29	(15)
2020–2021	Al-Salliya	21	(2)
2021–2022	Neftçi	21	(10)
2022–2024	Al-Orobah	47	(31)
2024	Neom	12	(9)
2024–2025	Al-Jubail	12	(4)
2025	Al-Ula	12	(12)
2025–	Al-Anwar	0	(0)
- * Club domestic league appearances and goals

Tiago Queiroz Bezerra (born 17 February 1987), is a Brazilian professional footballer who plays as a forward for Saudi Arabian club Al-Anwar.

== Career ==
On 30 June 2022, Neftçi announced that Bezerra had left the club after his contract wasn't renewed.

On 7 July 2022, Bezerra joined Saudi Arabian club Al-Orobah.

On 23 January 2024, Bezerra joined Neom.

On 3 August 2024, Bezerra joined Al-Jubail.

On 10 January 2025, Bezerra joined Al-Ula.

On 2 August 2025, Bezerra joined Al-Anwar.

== Honours ==
Al-Saliyah

- Qatari Stars Cup:2020–21

Neom

- Saudi Second Division League: 2023–24

Al-Ula

- Saudi Second Division League: 2024–25

Individual

- Kuwait Federation Cup Best Player: 2015–16
- Kuwait Federation Cup Top Scorer: 2015–16
- Uzbekistan Super League Best Player: 2018
