= Olivier Kwizera =

Rwandan footballer

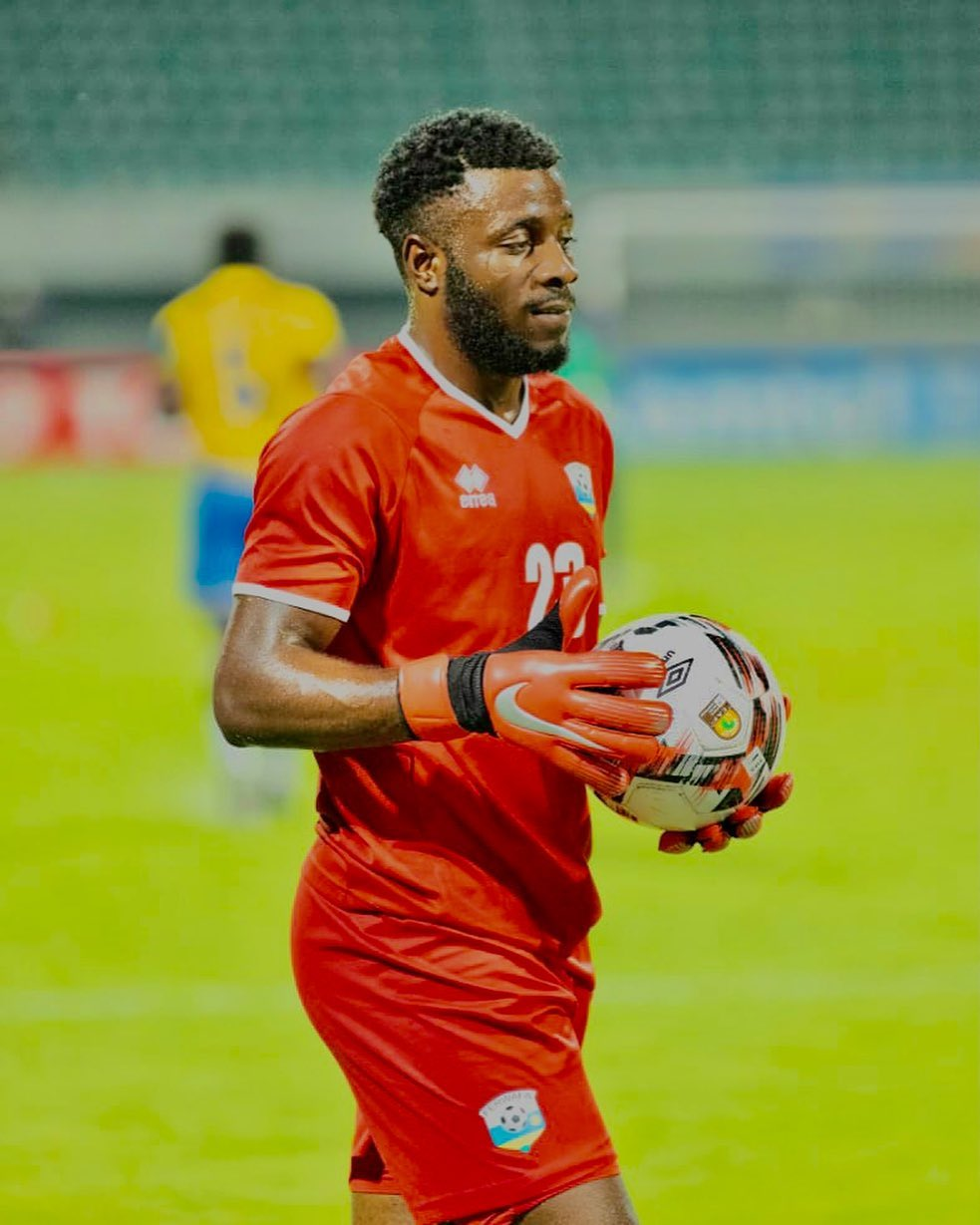

Personal information
- Date of birth: 30 July 1995 (age 31)
- Place of birth: Kigali, Rwanda
- Height: 1.76 m (5 ft 9 in)
- Position: Goalkeeper

Senior career*
| Years | Team | Apps | (Gls) |
| 2011–2013 | Isonga | | |
| 2013–2016 | APR FC | | |
| 2016–2017 | Bugesera | | |
| 2017–2019 | Free State Stars | 2 | (0) |
| 2018 | → Mthatha Bucks (loan) | 11 | (0) |
| 2020–2022 | Gasogi United | | |
| 2022–2025 | Al-Kawkab | | |

International career^{‡}
| 2015 | Rwanda U23 | | |
| 2012– | Rwanda | 22 | (0) |
- * Club domestic league appearances and goals ‡ National team caps and goals as of 30 July 2026

Olivier Kwizera (born 30 July 1995) is a Rwandan professional footballer who plays as goalkeeper.

== Club career ==
=== South Africa ===
Back in 2016, Kwizera almost signed for Maritzburg United of the South African Premier Division after being let go by APR FC.

Impressing in a trial for Free State Stars, the Kitale native was officially signed by the club in summer 2017 after getting his FIFA players intermediaries license, effectively becoming the first Rwandan goalkeeper to have played in South Africa. He left the club at the end of the 2018–19 season.

=== Back to Rwanda ===
Kwizera was without club until 27 December 2019, where he signed a six-month deal with newly promoted Rwanda Premier League club, Gasogi United Heroes FC.

=== Saudi Arabia ===
In September 2022, Kwizera joined Saudi Second Division side Al-Kawkab.

== International career ==
The goalkeeper was unavailable for the 2015 Africa U-23 Cup of Nations second leg qualifier opposing Uganda on account of a debilitating wound on his right ankle.

== Career statistics ==
=== International ===
As of match played 30 March 2026

Appearances and goals by national team and year
| National team | Year | Apps | Goals |
|---|---|---|---|
| Rwanda | 2012 | 1 | 0 |
| Rwanda | 2013 | – | |
| Rwanda | 2014 | – | |
| Rwanda | 2015 | 7 | 0 |
| Rwanda | 2016 | 2 | 0 |
| Rwanda | 2017 | – | |
| Rwanda | 2018 | 1 | 0 |
| Rwanda | 2019 | – | |
| Rwanda | 2020 | 2 | 0 |
| Rwanda | 2021 | 5 | 0 |
| Rwanda | 2022 | 2 | 0 |
| Rwanda | 2023 | – | |
| Rwanda | 2024 | – | |
| Rwanda | 2025 | – | |
| Rwanda | 2026 | 2 | 0 |
| Total | | 22 | 0 |
