= Al-Saqer FC =

Association football club in Saudi Arabia

Al-Saqer
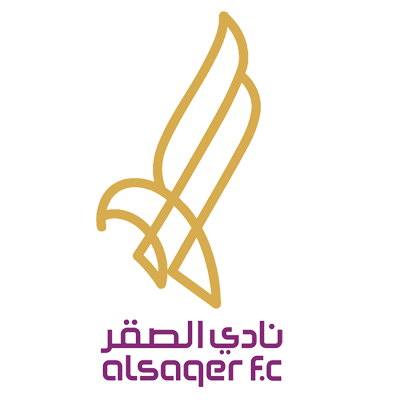
- Full name: Al-Saqer Football Club
- Founded: 1984; 42 years ago
- Ground: Al Basr, Buraidah
- Chairman: Mohammed Al-Mutairi
- Manager: Hedi Ben Mokhtar
- League: Saudi Second Division
- 2025-26: Saudi Second Division Group B, 1st of 16 (promoted)
Home colours	Away colours

Al-Saqer Football Club (Arabic: نادي الصقر) is a Saudi Arabian football club based in Al Basr, Buraidah and competes in the Saudi First Division League, the second tier of Saudi football. The club was founded in 1984 and its current president is Fahad Al-Mohaimeed. Al-Saqer won their first promotion to the Saudi Second Division during the 2020–21 season after reaching the semi-finals of the Saudi Third Division. They were crowned champions of the 2020–21 Third Division after defeating Al-Nairyah 5–3 on penalties. The club also consists of various other departments including, basketball, table tennis, handball and volleyball.

== Honours ==
Saudi Third Division (Level 4)

- Winners (1): 2020–21

Al-Qassim Regional League

- Winners (2): 2010–11, 2020–21

== Current squad ==
As of 1 January 2024:

Note: Flags indicate national team as defined under FIFA eligibility rules; some limited exceptions apply. Players may hold more than one non-FIFA nationality.

No.	Pos.	Nation	Player
3	DF	KSA	Hussein Hawsawi
4	DF	KSA	Nawaf Al-Mubarak
7	FW	NGR	Dennis Sesugh
8	MF	TOG	Emmanuel Kpatai
9	FW	KSA	Fahad Al-Dawood
10	MF	KSA	Hassan Al-Balawi
11	MF	FIN	Jasin-Amin Assehnoun
12	DF	KSA	Abdulrahman Al-Qassem
14	MF	KSA	Muayad Al-Dawas
15	MF	KSA	Mohanad Al-Shudukhi
17	DF	KSA	Salman Al-Saeed
18	MF	BRA	João Erick
19	FW	KSA	Yousef Azzam

No.	Pos.	Nation	Player
20	MF	KSA	Nawaf Al-Rashwodi
23	DF	KSA	Dawood Al-Taref
27	MF	KSA	Mohammed Al-Tuwaijri
28	MF	KSA	Turki Al-Shaifan (on loan from Al-Taawoun)
33	DF	BRA	Vinicius Milani
34	GK	KSA	Azzam Al-Hussayen
50	GK	KSA	Hani Al-Nahedh
52	DF	KSA	Abdulmajeed Al-Enezi
66	DF	KSA	Hamed Al-Mousa
77	GK	KSA	Fares Al-Shammeri
79	MF	KSA	Malik Hamza (on loan from Al-Faisaly)
88	MF	KSA	Sulaiman Al-Dulailan

== See also ==
- List of football clubs in Saudi Arabia
