= Mudhar Club =

Association football club in Saudi Arabia

Mudhar
- Full name: Mudhar Club
- Founded: 21 January 1970; 56 years ago
- Ground: Prince Nayef Sports City Stadium; Qatif, Saudi Arabia
- Capacity: 12,000
- Owner: Ministry of Sport
- Chairman: Adel Al-Setri
- Manager: Tarek Lahdhiri
- League: Saudi Second Division League
- 2025-26: Second Division, 4th of 16 Group B
Home colours	Away colours

Mudhar Club (Arabic: نادي مضر) is a Saudi Arabian professional football and multi-sport club based in Al-Qudaih, Qatif, in the Eastern Province. It competes in the Saudi Second Division League, the third tier of the Saudi football league system.

== History ==
The club was founded in 1970 as a result of a merger between two local teams, Al-Wehda and the original Mudhar Club. Its first president was Ali Al-Qudaihi.

Mudhar has competed in the Saudi Second Division League on four previous occasions, with their most recent appearance before promotion occurring in the 2000–01 season. In the 2022–23 season, the club won their first ever Saudi Third Division League title, earning promotion to the Second Division for the first time in over two decades.

== Honours ==
Saudi Third Division League (tier 4)

- Winners (1): 2022–23

== Current squad ==
As of 12 July 2023:

Note: Flags indicate national team as defined under FIFA eligibility rules; some limited exceptions apply. Players may hold more than one non-FIFA nationality.

No.	Pos.	Nation	Player
1	GK	KSA	Ahmed Al-Mushawah
3	DF	TUN	Houssem Chebli
4	DF	KSA	Ahmed Al-Shabeeb
6	MF	KSA	Mujtabah Al-Omani
7	MF	KSA	Ali Al-Shabeeb
8	DF	KSA	Hussain Al-Fandi
16	MF	KSA	Musab Habkor
17	DF	KSA	Abdulaziz Al Tawfiq
18	FW	KSA	Haidar Abo Shahin
22	GK	KSA	Faraj Mubarak

No.	Pos.	Nation	Player
23	GK	KSA	Majed Akjah
24	MF	CIV	Sylla Daouda
28	FW	CIV	Louis Abrogoua
30	FW	KSA	Sajjad Al Obaid
38	DF	KSA	Jawad Al-Sadah
66	MF	KSA	Abdulaziz Al-Shuhaib
77	DF	KSA	Murad Al-Enezi
89	DF	KSA	Fahad Al-Johani
—	MF	KSA	Faisal Masrahi
—	DF	KSA	Abdullah Al-Dossari

== See also ==
- List of football clubs in Saudi Arabia
