= Harrison Cardoso =

Brazilian footballer (born 1992)

Personal information
- Full name: Harrison Cardoso de Oliveira
- Date of birth: 9 July 1992 (age 34)
- Place of birth: Caraguatatuba, Brazil
- Height: 1.63 m (5 ft 4 in)
- Position: Attacking midfielder

Youth career
- 2012: Athletico Paranaense B

Senior career*
Years	Team	Apps	(Gls)
2012–2015	Athletico Paranaense B	36	(9)
2013	→ Cuiabá (loan)	10	(1)
2014	→ Joinville (loan)	11	(0)
2015–2016	Atlético Metropolitano	16	(2)
2015	→ Tombense (loan)	4	(0)
2016–2017	Rayong	23	(4)
2017	Petro de Luanda	3	(0)
2017–2018	Nongbua Pitchaya	23	(3)
2018–2019	Rayong	13	(3)
2019–2020	Chainat Hornbill	11	(0)
2020–2021	Kazma	10	(1)
2021–2022	Persita Tangerang	23	(7)
2022–2023	Qilwah		
2023–2024	Al-Sahel		
2024	Al-Jubail		
- * Club domestic league appearances and goals as of 31 March 2022

Harrison Cardoso de Oliveira (born 9 July 1992) is a Brazilian professional footballer who plays as an attacking midfielder.

== Career ==
Harrison started his career with Campeonato Brasileiro Série A club Athletico Paranaense B. He was then loaned to several clubs to add minutes to play such as Cuiabá in the 2013 season and Joinville in the 2014 season. While playing for Joinville, Harrison appeared in 11 matches and managed to make 1 assist for his partner to score.

Harrison then released permanently to Atlético Metropolitano in the 2017 season.

While strengthening Clube Atletico Metropolitano for two seasons, he also had a loan at the Tombense for half a season.

=== Persita Tangerang ===
On 30 June 2021, Persita Tangerang manager I Nyoman Suryanthara announced a deal for Harrison to join Indonesian Liga 1 club Persita on a free transfer.

On 28 August, Harrison made his competitive debut by starting in a 1–2 win at Persipura Jayapura. and scored his first goal for Persita against Persipura in the 15th minute from the penalty at the Pakansari Stadium. On 23 October 2021, Harrison scored a brace for Persita in 2021-22 Liga 1 match, earning them a 2–1 win over Persikabo 1973.
