= Mahmoud Al-Youssef =

Syrian football goalkeeper (born 1988)

Personal information
- Date of birth: 20 January 1988 (age 38)
- Place of birth: Lattakia, Syria
- Height: 1.91 m (6 ft 3 in)
- Position: Goalkeeper

Team information
- Current team: Al-Hurriya SC
- Number: 1

Youth career
- 2001–2007: Hutteen

Senior career*
Years	Team	Apps	(Gls)
2007–2013	Hutteen	175	(0)
2013–2015	Al-Musannah	65	(0)
2016	United Victory	12	(0)
2017–2018	Victory	27	(0)
2017–2018	→ Maziya (loan)	34	(0)
2018–2019	Al-Jabalain	34	(0)
2019–2020	Al-Jaish	28	(0)
2020	Al-Mujazzal	18	(0)
2021–2022	Maziya	38	(0)
2022	Al-Diriyah	15	(0)
2022–2025	Hetten		
2025–2026	Victory		

International career^{‡}
2008	Syria U-20		
2009–2012	Syria U-23		
2012–	Syria	4	(0)
- * Club domestic league appearances and goals ‡ National team caps and goals as of 3 June 2016

Mahmoud Al Youssef (Arabic: محمود اليوسف; born 20 January 1988) is a Syrian professional football goalkeeper.

== Club career ==
=== Syria ===
Mahmoud began his professional career in 2007 with Hutteen Latakia.
