= Rafa Miranda =

Portuguese footballer (born 1996)

Personal information
- Full name: Ricardo Rafael da Costa Miranda
- Date of birth: 23 January 1996 (age 30)
- Place of birth: Portugal
- Height: 1.81 m (5 ft 11 in)
- Position: Winger

Team information
- Current team: Al-Covilhã
- Number: 23

Senior career*
Years	Team	Apps	(Gls)
2013–2018	Rio Ave	1	(0)
2016	→ Pedras Rubras (loan)	14	(1)
2016–2018	→ Länk FC Vilaverdense (loan)	61	(22)
2019	Farul Constanța	13	(1)
2019	Universitatea Cluj	17	(0)
2020	Al-Seeb Club		
2020–2021	Länk FC Vilaverdense	19	(6)
2021-2022	Silon Táborsko	12	(0)
2022	Al-Nahda Club	12	(4)
2022–2023	Al-Najma SC	32	(8)
2023–2025	Al-Washm	17	(5)
2025–	Al-Covilhã	4	(0)
- * Club domestic league appearances and goals as of 15 June 2025

Ricardo Rafael da Costa Miranda (born 23 January 1996) is a Portuguese footballer who plays as a winger/playmaker for Al-Covilhã.

== Life ==
Miranda is a native of Barcelos, Portugal. Miranda has been married and has two sons.

== Career ==
Miranda mainly operates as a winger. He started his career with Portuguese side Rio Ave F.C. After that, he played for Omani side Al-Seeb Club, helping the club win the league.
