= Al-Rayyan Club (Saudi Arabia) =

Association football club in Saudi Arabia

Al-Rayyan
- Full name: Al-Rayyan Club
- Founded: 1980; 46 years ago
- Ground: Ar Rawdah, Ha'il
- Chairman: Mohammed bin Dhaidan Al-Tamimi
- Manager: Hosni Zouaoui
- League: Saudi Second Division
- 2024-25: Saudi Second Division, 10th (Group B)
Home colours	Away colours

Al-Rayyan Club (Arabic: نادي الريان) is a Saudi Arabian football club based in Ar Rawdah, Ha'il and competes in the Saudi Second Division, the third tier of Saudi football. The club was founded in 1980 and its first president was Abdullah Al-Mansour. Al-Rayyan won their first promotion to the Saudi Second Division during the 2020–21 season after reaching the semi-finals of the Saudi Third Division. The club also consists of various other departments including, basketball, table tennis, and handball. The club's current president is Mohammed bin Dhaidan Al-Tamimi.

== Current squad ==
As of 1 August 2024:

Note: Flags indicate national team as defined under FIFA eligibility rules; some limited exceptions apply. Players may hold more than one non-FIFA nationality.

No.	Pos.	Nation	Player
1	GK	KSA	Mohammed Al-Zahrani
6	MF	KSA	Faisal Al-Tamimi
7	DF	KSA	Badr Al-Jameel
8	MF	KSA	Dabbas Al-Shammeri
9	FW	KSA	Hashem Al-Hashem
10	MF	TUN	Mootez Abou Kacem
11	MF	KSA	Sulaiman Mutlaq
12	DF	KSA	Rami Al-Ahmadi
13	DF	KSA	Abdulaziz Al-Shammari
14	MF	KSA	Omar Al-Shammeri
17	MF	TUN	Youssef Trabelsi
18	MF	KSA	Abdullah Al-Ghamdi
19	FW	CMR	Boris Bissemou

No.	Pos.	Nation	Player
20	MF	CMR	Duval Wapiwo
22	GK	KSA	Fahad Al-Sader
24	FW	TUN	Sabri Zaidi
25	MF	EGY	Khalid Shehata
26	MF	KSA	Abdulrahman Al-Shammari
27	MF	KSA	Fahad Al-Shammari
28	DF	KSA	Mishal Al-Ruwaili
29	MF	KSA	Naif Latifa
30	GK	KSA	Malek Tolah
31	DF	KSA	Mohammed Al-Nasser
35	DF	KSA	Ali Al-Johaim
—	GK	KSA	Raghdan Matri
—	DF	KSA	Ibrahim Al-Shehri
—	MF	KSA	Khalifa Al-Shobaiki

== See also ==
- List of football clubs in Saudi Arabia
