= Lawson Bekui =

Ghanaian professional footballer

Personal information
- Date of birth: 12 August 1994 (age 32)
- Place of birth: Accra, Ghana
- Height: 1.84 m (6 ft 0 in)
- Position: Forward

Team information
- Current team: Al-Rawdhah
- Number: 17

Youth career
- –2015: Dreams

Senior career*
Years	Team	Apps	(Gls)
2015–2016	Dreams	15	(7)
2016–2021	Dhofar Club		
2017–2018	→ Extremadura B (loan)		
2018	→ Politehnica Iași (loan)	8	(1)
2019–	→ AC Kajaani (loan)	9	(3)
2019–2021	→ Muscat Club (loan)		
2021–2023	Al-Sahel	50	(10)
2023–2024	Al-Entesar		
2024–	Al-Rawdhah		
- * Club domestic league appearances and goals as of 23:54, 9 February 2020 (UTC)

Lawson Bekui (born 12 August 1994) is a Ghanaian professional footballer who plays as a forward for Al-Rawdhah.

== Career ==
On 1 March 2019, Bekui joined Finnish club AC Kajaani on loan from Dhofar Club. On 9 September 2019, he then left the club and was loaned out to Muscat Club instead.

On 7 February 2023, Bekui joined Al-Entesar. On 12 September 2024, Bekui joined Al-Rawdhah.

== Honours ==
Dhofar Club

- Oman League: 2016–17
- Oman Super Cup: 2017
