= Jerash FC =

Association football club in Saudi Arabia

Jerash
- Full name: Jerash Football Club
- Founded: 31 July 1979; 47 years ago
- Ground: Prince Sultan bin Abdul Aziz Reserve Stadium, Abha
- Chairman: Hashem Hashlan
- Manager: Abdulaziz Al-Qahtani
- League: Saudi Second Division
- 2024-25: Saudi Second Division, 4th (Group B)
Home colours	Away colours

Jerash FC (Arabic: نادي جرش) is a Saudi Arabian football club based in Ahad Rafidah, Asir and competes in the Saudi Second Division, the third tier of Saudi football. The club was founded in 1979 by Dalim bin Saad Al-Qahtani.

Jerash won their first promotion to the Saudi Second Division during the 2021–22 season after finishing first in their group. They lost in the semi-finals to eventual champions Al-Suqoor.

== Current squad ==
As of 30 July 2024:

Note: Flags indicate national team as defined under FIFA eligibility rules; some limited exceptions apply. Players may hold more than one non-FIFA nationality.

No.	Pos.	Nation	Player
1	GK	KSA	Khaled Al-Shayeb
4	DF	KSA	Ahmed Assiri
5	DF	KSA	Saeed Al-Qahtani
6	MF	KSA	Sultan Aqili
7	MF	KSA	Abdulaziz Asiri
9	FW	TOG	Honoré Kpegba
11	FW	SUI	Raël Lolala
14	MF	KSA	Ali Khabrani
15	DF	KSA	Raed Al Shaiban
16	MF	KSA	Ali Al Madan
17	MF	KSA	Mohammed Al-Asmari
18	DF	KSA	Saeed Al-Shahrani
19	DF	KSA	Turki Al-Sarhani
20	DF	KSA	Ahmed Al-Asmari

No.	Pos.	Nation	Player
23	DF	KSA	Ibrahim Al-Aqeeli
24	DF	KSA	Ali Maedi
26	DF	EGY	Mido
29	DF	KSA	Moath Al-Sarhani
55	GK	KSA	Mohammed Al-Enezi
77	FW	KSA	Omar Al-Zahrani
87	MF	KSA	Meshal Al-Zahrani
98	GK	KSA	Mustafa Al Zaid
—	DF	KSA	Majed Jaafari
—	MF	KSA	Aseel Aqili
—	MF	BRA	Wilson Potiguar
—	MF	KSA	Muaiad Al-Shuwaifey
—	FW	KSA	Hassan Sharahili

== See also ==
- List of football clubs in Saudi Arabia
