= Ahad Rafidah =

- Location in Saudi Arabia
- Coordinates: 18°12′16″N 42°48′47″E
- Country: Saudi Arabia
- Province: Asir Province

Population (2010 census)
  - Total: 57,112
- Time zone: UTC+3

Ahad Rafidah (Arabic: احد رفيده) is a province in southern Saudi Arabia in the Asir Province. The number of its affiliated villages is 144 villages, and its population is close to one hundred thousand people. The majority of citizens in this city are from the Qahtani tribe.

== Location ==
Together with Khamis Mushait and Abha, Ahad Rafidah is centrally located in Wadi Bisha. It is 15 km southeast from Khamis Mushait and about 30 km east of Abha. Ahad Rafidah is located on the national road 15. It is about 100 km southwest from the Red Sea and 110 km north of the Yemeni border.
