= 2024–25 Saudi First Division League =

First Division League
- Season: 2024–25
- Dates: 19 August 2024 – 18 May 2025
- Champions: Neom (1st title)
- Promoted: Neom; Al-Najma; Al-Hazem
- Relegated: Al-Ain; Al-Safa; Ohod
- Matches: 306
- Goals: 794 (2.59 per match)
- Top goalscorer: Alan Cariús (20 goals)
- Biggest home win: Al-Tai 5–0 Al-Batin (4 December 2024)
- Biggest away win: Jeddah 0–6 Neom (29 April 2025)
- Highest scoring: Al-Batin 2–7 Neom (8 April 2025)
- Longest winning run: Neom (7 matches)
- Longest unbeaten run: Neom (19 matches)
- Longest winless run: Al-Safa (19 matches)
- Longest losing run: Al-Safa; Ohod (9 matches)
- All statistics correct as of 29 May 2025.

The 2024–25 First Division League (known as the Yelo League for sponsorship reasons) is the fourth season of the Saudi First Division League after its rebrand, and the 48th season of the Saudi First Division since its establishment in 1976.

On 22 April, Neom became the first team to be promoted following a 3–0 away win against Al-Arabi. They were crowned champions following a 6–0 away win against Jeddah on 29 April. They set the record for the most points and most wins in a 34–league game season and set the record for most goals scored in a season. On 12 May, Al-Najma became the second club to be promoted following a 2–0 home win against Ohod. On 29 May, Al-Hazem became the third and final club to be promoted after defeating Al-Adalah 3–0 in the promotion play-offs final.

On 28 April, Ohod became the first team to be relegated after a 1–1 draw with Al-Adalah. On 6 May, Al-Safa became the second team to be relegated following a 4–1 home defeat to Al-Arabi. On 12 May, Al-Ain became the third and the final club to be relegated following a 2–2 draw with Al-Faisaly.

== Overview ==
=== Changes ===
On 21 June 2024, the FDL announced the introduction of a play-off system to determine the third team to be promoted to the Saudi Pro League. Teams placed between third and sixth position took part in the promotion play-offs. The fifth-placed would face the fourth, while the sixth-placed team would face the third. The final would be single-legged, hosted by the higher-placed team.

=== Team changes ===
The following teams have changed division since the 2023–24 season.

=== To the First Division League ===
Promoted from Second Division

- Neom
- Al-Jubail
- Al-Zulfi

Relegated from Pro League

- Abha
- Al-Tai
- Al-Hazem

=== From the First Division League ===
Promoted to Pro League

- Al-Qadsiah
- Al-Orobah
- Al-Kholood

Relegated to Second Division

- Al-Qaisumah
- Hajer
- Al-Taraji

== Teams ==
A total of 18 teams will be contesting the league, including 12 sides from the 2023–24 season, the three promoted teams from the Second Division and the three relegated sides from the Saudi Pro League.

Al-Hazem were the first team to be relegated following a 4–1 home defeat to Al-Hilal on 11 May 2024. Al-Hazem were relegated after just one year in the top flight. This was their third relegation in five years. Both Abha and Al-Tai were relegated on the final day of the season. Abha were relegated following a 2–1 defeat away to Al-Hazem. Al-Tai were relegated following a 2–0 home defeat to Al-Okhdood. Abha were relegated after five seasons in the top flight while Al-Tai were relegated after three seasons. Abha will play in their 20th season in the FD League, while Al-Hazem will play in their 15th season and Al-Tai in their 23rd season.

The first club to be promoted was Al-Jubail who did so after a 1–1 draw against Bisha on 16 March 2024. On 22 March 2024, Neom became the second club to be promoted following a 3–2 win against Al-Zulfi. The third and final club to be promoted was Al-Zulfi, who did so following a 3–0 aggregate win over Al-Diriyah in the promotion play-offs on 17 April 2024.

Neom were crowned champions for the first time after defeating Al-Jubail 3–2 in the final.

Neom return to the First Division League after an absence of 12 years. They return to the league for the first time since the 2011–12 season and will play in their 2nd overall season. In addition, this will be their first season in the FDL since their name change. Both Al-Jubail and Al-Zulfi were promoted to the First Division League for the first time in history.

=== Stadium and personnel ===
Locations of teams in the 2024–25 First Division League

Note: Table lists in alphabetical order.

Team	Location	Stadium	Capacity	Head coach
Abha	Abha	Prince Sultan bin Abdul Aziz Stadium	20,000	(Tunisia) Abderrazek Chebbi
Al-Adalah	Al-Hasa	Prince Abdullah bin Jalawi Stadium; Hajer Club Stadium	19,099; 12,000	(Slovakia) Martin Ševela
Al-Ain	Al Atawlah	King Saud Sport City Stadium	10,000	(Portugal) Jorge Paixão
Al-Arabi	Unaizah	Department of Education Stadium	10,000	(Spain) Kiko López
Al-Batin	Hafar al-Batin	Al-Batin Club Stadium	6,000	(Saudi Arabia) Khalil Al-Masri
Al-Bukiryah	Al Bukayriyah	Al-Bukiryah Club Stadium	5,000	(Uruguay) Leonardo Ramos
Al-Faisaly	Harmah	Al Majma'ah Sports City (Al Majma'ah)	6,266	(Spain) Pablo Franco
Al-Hazem	Ar Rass	Al-Hazem Club Stadium	8,000	(Tunisia) Jalel Kadri
Al-Jabalain	Ha'il	Prince Abdul Aziz bin Musa'ed Stadium	12,250	(Portugal) Jorge Mendonça
Al-Jandal	Dumat al-Jandal	Al-Orobah Club Stadium (Sakakah)	7,000	(Saudi Arabia) Ziyad Al-Afar
Al-Jubail	Jubail	Al-Jubail Club Stadium	3,000	(Saudi Arabia) Khalid Al-Nuaimi
Al-Najma	Unaizah	Department of Education Stadium; Al-Najma Club Stadium	10,000; 7,000	(Portugal) Mário Silva
Al-Safa	Safwa	Al-Safa Club Stadium; Prince Saud bin Jalawi Stadium (Khobar); Prince Mohamed bin Fahd Stadium (Dammam)	3,500; 15,000; 22,042	(Saudi Arabia) Reda Al-Janabi
Al-Tai	Ha'il	Prince Abdul Aziz bin Musa'ed Stadium	12,000	(Croatia) Zdravko Logarušić
Al-Zulfi	Al Zulfi	Al-Zulfi Club Stadium	3,080	(Saudi Arabia) Khalid Al-Koroni
Jeddah	Jeddah	Prince Abdullah Al-Faisal Stadium; Sports Hall at King Abdullah Sports City	27,000; 1,250	(Spain) Iván Carrasco
Neom	Tabuk	King Khalid Sport City Stadium	12,000	(Brazil) Péricles Chamusca
Ohod	Medina	Ohod Club Stadium	5,000	(Tunisia) Habib Ben Romdhane

=== Managerial changes ===
Team	Outgoing manager	Manner of departure	Date of vacancy	Position in table	Incoming manager	Date of appointment
Abha	(South Africa) Pitso Mosimane	End of contract	1 June 2024	Pre-season	(Tunisia) Abderrazek Chebbi	20 August 2024
Al-Adalah	(Netherlands) Roel Coumans	End of contract	1 June 2024	Pre-season	(Slovakia) Martin Ševela	19 June 2024
Al-Ain	(Serbia) Zoran Milinković	End of contract	1 June 2024	Pre-season	(Portugal) Ricardo Sousa	15 August 2024
Al-Arabi	(Saudi Arabia) Yousef Anbar	End of contract	1 June 2024	Pre-season	(Kuwait) Maher Al-Shammari	21 June 2024
Al-Bukiryah	(Saudi Arabia) Khalil Al-Masri	End of contract	1 June 2024	Pre-season	(France) Denis Lavagne	11 July 2024
Al-Faisaly	(Brazil) Marcelo Chamusca	End of contract	1 June 2024	Pre-season	(Portugal) Filipe Gouveia	6 June 2024
Al-Jabalain	(Tunisia) Nacif Beyaoui	End of contract	1 June 2024	Pre-season	(Portugal) Jorge Mendonça	14 July 2024
Al-Jubail	(Egypt) Ayman El Seraj	End of contract	1 June 2024	Pre-season	(France) Laurent Hagist	2 July 2024
Al-Najma	(Italy) Giovanni Solinas	End of contract	1 June 2024	Pre-season	(Portugal) Mário Silva	7 July 2024
Al-Safa	(France) Laurent Hagist	End of contract	1 June 2024	Pre-season	(Portugal) Carlos Pinto	30 June 2024
Al-Tai	(Uruguay) Leonardo Ramos	End of contract	1 June 2024	Pre-season	(Serbia) Aleksandar Ilić	12 July 2024
Al-Zulfi	(Tunisia) Makram Abdullah Ghazaleh	End of contract	1 June 2024	Pre-season	(Serbia) Zoran Milinković	3 June 2024
Jeddah	(Kuwait) Maher Al-Shammari	End of contract	1 June 2024	Pre-season	(Spain) Iván Carrasco	25 July 2024
Neom	(Tunisia) Afouène Gharbi	End of contract	1 June 2024	Pre-season	(Brazil) Péricles Chamusca	1 June 2024
Ohod	(Croatia) Damir Burić	End of contract	1 June 2024	Pre-season	(Saudi Arabia) Yousef Anbar	20 July 2024
Al-Batin	(Saudi Arabia) Abdulaziz Nasser	End of caretaker period	1 June 2024	Pre-season	(Portugal) Rui Almeida	15 July 2024
Al-Arabi	(Kuwait) Maher Al-Shammari	Sacked	4 October 2024	6th	(Croatia) Damir Burić	4 October 2024
Al-Bukiryah	(France) Denis Lavagne	Sacked	4 October 2024	18th	(Portugal) Nandinho	13 October 2024
Al-Tai	(Serbia) Aleksandar Ilić	Sacked	12 October 2024	9th	(Tunisia) Mohamed Kouki	15 October 2024
Al-Batin	(Portugal) Rui Almeida	Mutual consent	16 October 2024	7th	(Tunisia) Nacif Beyaoui	16 October 2024
Al-Safa	(Portugal) Carlos Pinto	Sacked	18 October 2024	17th	(Netherlands) Eelco Schattorie	18 October 2024
Al-Ain	(Portugal) Ricardo Sousa	Sacked	28 October 2024	15th	(Algeria) Toufik Rouabah	31 October 2024
Al-Jubail	(France) Laurent Hagist	Sacked	31 October 2024	10th	(Switzerland) Jonathan Mabanza (caretaker)	31 October 2024
Al-Jubail	(Switzerland) Jonathan Mabanza (caretaker)	End of caretaker period	16 November 2024	14th	(Bosnia and Herzegovina) Darko Nestorović	16 November 2024
Al-Faisaly	(Portugal) Filipe Gouveia	Mutual consent	28 November 2024	16th	(Saudi Arabia) Alhomaidi Al-Otaibi (caretaker)	28 November 2024
Al-Safa	(Netherlands) Eelco Schattorie	Resigned	6 December 2024	14th	(Argentina) Juan Brown	8 December 2024
Al-Faisaly	(Saudi Arabia) Alhomaidi Al-Otaibi (caretaker)	End of caretaker period	30 December 2024	15th	(Spain) Pablo Franco	30 December 2024
Al-Bukiryah	(Portugal) Nandinho	Signed by Al-Muharraq	30 January 2025	9th	(Uruguay) Leonardo Ramos	31 January 2025
Ohod	(Saudi Arabia) Yousef Anbar	Resigned	5 February 2025	18th	(Tunisia) Hafedh Hamzaoui (caretaker)	5 February 2025
Ohod	(Tunisia) Hafedh Hamzaoui (caretaker)	End of caretaker period	15 February 2025	18th	(Tunisia) Habib Ben Romdhane	15 February 2025
Al-Ain	(Algeria) Toufik Rouabah	Sacked	20 February 2025	17th	(Portugal) Jorge Paixão	21 February 2025
Al-Batin	(Tunisia) Nacif Beyaoui	Mutual consent	25 February 2025	14th	(Saudi Arabia) Khalil Al-Masri	25 February 2025
Al-Zulfi	(Serbia) Zoran Milinković	Sacked	5 March 2025	12th	(Saudi Arabia) Khalid Al-Koroni	5 March 2025
Al-Arabi	(Croatia) Damir Burić	Sacked	5 March 2025	9th	(Saudi Arabia) Hamoud Al-Saiari	5 March 2025
Al-Safa	(Argentina) Juan Brown	Sacked	7 March 2025	17th	(Saudi Arabia) Reda Al-Janabi	7 March 2025
Al-Arabi	(Saudi Arabia) Hamoud Al-Saiari	Resigned	18 March 2025	10th	(Spain) Kiko López	28 March 2025
Al-Jubail	(Bosnia and Herzegovina) Darko Nestorović	Sacked	8 April 2025	14th	(Saudi Arabia) Khalid Al-Nuaimi	8 April 2025
Al-Hazem	(Saudi Arabia) Saleh Al-Mohammadi	Sacked	10 April 2025	3rd	(Tunisia) Jalel Kadri	14 April 2025
Al-Tai	(Tunisia) Mohamed Kouki	Mutual consent	16 April 2025	7th	(Croatia) Zdravko Logarušić	16 April 2025

=== Foreign players ===
On 9 March 2024, the Saudi FF announced that the number of foreign players would be decreased from 7 players to 5 players.

- Players name in **bold** indicates the player is registered during the mid-season transfer window.
- Players in italics were out of the squad or left the club within the season, after the pre-season transfer window, or in the mid-season transfer window, and at least had one appearance.

Club	Player 1	Player 2	Player 3	Player 4	Player 5	Former players
Abha	(Argentina) Fabián Noguera	(The Gambia) **Muhammed Badamosi**	(Ivory Coast) Lamine N'dao	(Morocco) **Nabil Marmouk**	(Zambia) **Evans Kangwa**	(The Gambia) Modou Barrow (Guinea) François Kamano (Kenya) Johnstone Omurwa (Nigeria) Godspower Aniefiok
Al-Adalah	(Algeria) Rédha Bensayah	(Brazil) Alan Cariús	(Brazil) Philipe Maia	(Morocco) Amine Atouchi	(Nigeria) Anthony Okpotu	
Al-Ain	(Argentina) **Mauro González**	(Bosnia and Herzegovina) Slaviša Bogdanović	(Ghana) Kwame Bonsu	(Guinea-Bissau) Ença Fati	(Uganda) Halid Lwaliwa	(England) Gozie Ugwu
Al-Arabi	(Austria) **Christopher Knett**	(Honduras) Romell Quioto	(Mali) Hamidou Traoré	(Netherlands) Ola John	(Senegal) Ablaye Mbengue	(Brazil) Reinaldo Dutra
Al-Batin	(France) Thibault Peyre	(Mali) **Aly Desse Sissoko**	(Morocco) **Abdelali Mhamdi**	(Portugal) Afonso Taira	(Tunisia) **Oussama Bouguerra**	(Netherlands) Kevin Luckassen (Nigeria) Ibrahim Tomiwa (Portugal) João Amaral
Al-Bukiryah	(Argentina) Fernando Piñero	(Australia) Connor Pain	(Lithuania) Džiugas Bartkus	(Moldova) Henrique Luvannor	(Netherlands) Hicham Faik	
Al-Faisaly	(Argentina) **Junior Mendieta**	(Brazil) Lucas Souza	(Brazil) Morato	(Senegal) Abdoulaye Ba	(Senegal) **Moussa Djitté**	(Portugal) Alexandre Guedes (Portugal) Vladimir Stojković
Al-Hazem	(Algeria) Okacha Hamzaoui	(Curaçao) Juriën Gaari	(France) Karim Yoda	(Guinea-Bissau) Zinho Gano	(Senegal) Ibrahima Ndiaye	(Romania) Alexandru Albu
Al-Jabalain	(Brazil) Jobson	(Brazil) Kaká Mendes	(Brazil) Marcelo Carné	(Colombia) Juanjo Narváez	(Switzerland) Léo Lacroix	
Al-Jandal	(Brazil) Leandrinho	(Ivory Coast) Cheick Comara	(Nigeria) Chisom Egbuchulam	(Portugal) Emanuel Novo	(Tunisia) Yassine Amri	(Portugal) Leandro Silva
Al-Jubail	(Brazil) **Allan Sousa**	(Brazil) Rafael Martins	(Brazil) Vina	(Brazil) Walmerson	(Cameroon) **Appolinaire Kack**	(Brazil) Tiago Bezerra (Brazil) Roberto Dias
Al-Najma	(Brazil) Léo Tilica	(Brazil) Max Walef	(France) Bilel Aouacheria	(Iraq) Ali Adnan Kadhim	(Netherlands) Sylla Sow	(Spain) Agi Dambelley
Al-Safa						(Brazil) Fabinho (Brazil) Maicon (Colombia) Danilo Asprilla (Colombia) Luis Hinestroza (Mali) Daouda Toure (Romania) Alexandru Albu (Tunisia) Borhane Hakimi
Al-Tai	(Cameroon) Léandre Tawamba	(Mali) Ibrahima Tandia	(Montenegro) **Nebojša Kosović**	(Romania) Andrei Cordea	(Zambia) Emmanuel Banda	(Croatia) Marko Dugandžić
Al-Zulfi	(Brazil) Diego Miranda	(Brazil) Diego Silva	(Ghana) Sadat Karim	(Netherlands) **Mounir El Allouchi**	(Nigeria) Erhun Obanor	(Rwanda) Isaac Mitima
Jeddah	(Argentina) Isaías Rodríguez	(Colombia) Ricardo Caraballo	(Gabon) Medwin Biteghé	(Venezuela) Bryant Ortega		
Neom	(Algeria) **Saïd Benrahma**	(Brazil) Carlos Júnior	(Egypt) Ahmed Hegazi	(Guinea-Bissau) Alfa Semedo	(Senegal) Mbaye Diagne	(Brazil) Romarinho
Ohod						(Poland) Konrad Michalak

== League table ==
Pos	Team	Pld	W	D	L	GF	GA	GD	Pts	Promotion, qualification or relegation
1	Neom (C, P)	34	24	7	3	80	27	+53	79	Promotion to the Pro League
2	Al-Najma (P)	34	20	5	9	54	33	+21	65	Promotion to the Pro League
3	Al-Hazem (O, P)	34	18	6	10	57	43	+14	60	Qualification for the promotion play-offs
4	Al-Jabalain (Note: The Club Licensing Appeals Committee rejected the appeal of Al-Jabalain after the committee announced that it would not grant the club a local license due to its failure to meet a number of mandatory criteria in the licensing regulations. Thus, Al-Jabalain were excluded from the playoff places.) (D)	34	16	11	7	46	34	+12	59	
5	Al-Adalah	34	16	10	8	58	46	+12	58 (Note: Al-Adalah finished ahead of Al-Bukiryah on head-to-head points: Al-Adalah: 6 pts, Al-Bukiryah: 0 pts (Al-Adalah 2–0 Al-Bukiryah, Al-Bukiryah 0–2 Al-Adalah).)	Qualification for the promotion play-offs
6	Al-Bukiryah	34	17	7	10	46	24	+22	58	Qualification for the promotion play-offs
7	Al-Tai	34	16	8	10	50	37	+13	56	Qualification for the promotion play-offs
8	Abha	34	12	12	10	46	48	−2	48	
9	Al-Zulfi	34	10	14	10	36	36	0	44	
10	Jeddah	34	10	13	11	32	39	−7	43	
11	Al-Batin	34	11	9	14	39	56	−17	42	
12	Al-Arabi	34	10	9	15	51	59	−8	39 (Note: Al-Arabi finished ahead of Al-Jubail on overall goal difference: Al-Arabi –8, Al-Jubail –10 (Al-Jubail 3–1 Al-Arabi, Al-Arabi 3–1 Al-Jubail).)	
13	Al-Jubail	34	9	12	13	34	44	−10	39	
14	Al-Faisaly	34	8	10	16	38	50	−12	34 (Note: Al-Faisaly finished ahead of Al-Jandal on head-to-head points: Al-Faisaly: 4 pts, Al-Jandal: 1 pts (Al-Faisaly 0–0 Al-Jandal, Al-Jandal 0–2 Al-Faisaly).)	
15	Al-Jandal	34	9	7	18	33	44	−11	34	
16	Al-Ain (R)	34	6	12	16	29	49	−20	30	Relegation to the Second Division
17	Al-Safa (R)	34	6	6	22	34	70	−36	24	Relegation to the Second Division
18	Ohod (R)	34	6	6	22	31	55	−24	24	Relegation to the Second Division

Source: goalzz.com
Rules for classification: 1) Points; 2) Head-to-head points; 3) Head-to-head goal difference; 4) Total goal difference; 5) Total goals scored; 6) Fair-play points
(Note: Head-to-head record is used only after all the matches between the teams in question have been played).
(C) Champions; (D) Disqualified; (O) Play-off winners; (P) Promoted; (R) Relegated

=== Positions by round ===
The table lists the positions of teams after each week of matches. In order to preserve chronological evolution, any postponed matches are not included in the round at which they were originally scheduled but added to the full round they were played immediately afterward.

Team ╲ Round	1	2	3	4	5	6	7	8	9	10	11	12	13	14	15	16	17	18	19	20	21	22	23	24	25	26	27	28	29	30	31	32	33	34
Neom	3	1	1	1	1	1	1	1	1	1	1	1	1	1	1	1	1	3	1	1	1	1	1	1	1	1	1	1	1	1	1	1	1	1
Al-Najma	1	8	13	7	9	10	7	7	6	5	4	3	3	6	5	5	6	5	5	5	4	4	4	3	4	3	2	2	2	2	2	2	2	2
Al-Hazem	7	4	3	3	2	3	2	2	2	2	2	2	2	2	3	3	5	2	2	2	2	2	3	4	2	2	3	3	3	4	4	5	3	3
Al-Jabalain	13	17	14	13	13	14	12	14	10	8	10	10	9	10	7	8	7	7	4	4	5	6	6	5	6	6	6	5	5	6	6	6	4	4
Al-Adalah	2	10	6	6	6	8	5	5	8	11	6	8	4	3	2	2	3	1	3	3	3	3	2	2	3	4	4	4	4	3	3	3	6	5
Al-Bukiryah	17	15	16	17	18	18	16	15	14	10	8	9	13	11	8	7	8	8	9	10	10	9	10	7	7	7	7	6	6	5	5	4	5	6
Al-Tai	18	16	12	14	7	9	6	6	5	7	9	4	5	4	4	4	2	6	7	6	6	5	5	6	5	5	5	7	7	7	7	7	7	7
Abha	16	9	5	5	3	4	4	4	4	4	7	7	8	7	10	11	9	9	8	8	9	10	11	11	11	9	9	9	9	9	10	8	8	8
Al-Zulfi	12	6	11	10	10	15	13	9	11	15	11	13	11	12	13	15	12	12	12	14	13	12	12	12	12	12	11	10	10	10	8	9	9	9
Jeddah	6	7	2	2	4	2	3	3	3	3	3	6	7	8	9	9	10	11	10	9	8	8	7	8	8	8	8	8	8	8	9	10	10	10
Al-Batin	8	14	10	12	12	7	10	12	15	16	15	16	16	14	15	13	14	10	11	13	14	14	14	14	13	13	13	14	14	12	11	11	11	11
Al-Arabi	11	12	9	9	11	6	11	13	7	6	5	5	6	5	6	6	4	4	6	7	7	7	8	9	9	10	10	11	11	11	12	12	12	12
Al-Jubail	15	13	17	18	15	11	14	10	12	14	14	11	15	16	16	17	17	15	13	12	12	13	13	13	14	14	14	15	15	15	13	13	13	13
Al-Faisaly	4	2	4	4	5	5	8	8	9	12	16	15	14	15	14	14	15	16	16	16	16	15	16	15	15	15	15	13	13	14	15	15	15	14
Al-Jandal	14	18	18	16	17	12	9	11	13	9	13	12	10	9	11	12	13	13	14	11	11	11	9	10	10	11	12	12	12	13	14	14	14	15
Al-Ain	9	3	7	8	8	13	15	16	17	17	17	17	17	17	17	16	16	17	17	17	17	17	15	16	16	16	16	16	16	16	16	16	16	16
Al-Safa	5	11	15	15	16	17	18	18	16	13	12	14	12	13	12	10	11	14	15	15	15	16	17	17	17	17	17	17	17	17	17	17	17	17
Ohod	10	5	8	11	14	16	17	17	18	18	18	18	18	18	18	18	18	18	18	18	18	18	18	18	18	18	18	18	18	18	18	18	18	18

Promotion to the Pro League
Qualification for the promotion play-offs
Relegation to the Second Division

Updated to match(es) played on 18 May 2025. Source:

== Results ==
Home \ Away	ABH	ADA	AIN	ARB	BAT	BUK	FSY	HAZ	JAB	JAN	JUB	NAJ	SAF	TAI	ZUL	JED	NEO	OHD
Abha		3–3	0–0	1–0	2–2	1–3	3–1	1–1	1–1	1–1	4–0	1–0	1–0	0–1	1–1	2–2	0–2	2–1
Al-Adalah	2–3		2–1	2–4	4–0	2–0	3–3	3–1	1–1	3–2	1–1	3–1	1–0	2–1	1–1	1–2	0–3	1–1
Al-Ain	0–3	0–0		1–0	1–1	0–0	1–1	2–1	0–1	2–2	0–2	1–3	3–2	0–1	0–1	1–0	0–1	1–1
Al-Arabi	1–2	1–2	3–0		2–2	0–2	2–1	3–1	2–2	0–2	3–1	1–2	2–2	0–4	1–1	2–0	0–3	3–4
Al-Batin	3–2	3–2	1–0	3–1		0–3	3–1	1–3	0–1	0–0	1–0	1–2	0–0	3–2	0–0	1–2	2–7	1–0
Al-Bukiryah	0–1	0–2	5–0	0–1	2–0		1–1	2–0	0–1	2–1	0–0	2–0	3–0	0–0	1–0	3–1	1–2	1–1
Al-Faisaly	2–2	3–0	2–2	1–1	1–2	0–1		0–1	0–1	0–0	1–0	2–2	1–2	0–1	0–2	1–1	3–2	0–1
Al-Hazem	4–1	1–0	1–1	2–1	3–1	0–3	1–0		4–2	3–1	3–1	0–2	3–0	1–1	2–1	3–0	0–2	1–1
Al-Jabalain	3–1	1–2	4–1	3–3	2–1	2–1	0–1	2–2		1–0	0–0	1–0	4–2	0–0	1–1	1–0	1–0	1–0
Al-Jandal	2–0	0–2	1–0	1–2	0–0	0–1	0–2	1–2	1–2		2–1	2–3	2–1	2–3	2–0	0–0	0–1	3–1
Al-Jubail	0–1	1–2	1–1	3–1	1–1	2–1	1–1	2–1	2–1	2–1		1–2	0–1	2–2	2–2	1–1	0–4	0–0
Al-Najma	3–0	2–2	1–0	3–0	1–2	1–2	3–0	2–1	2–1	1–1	1–0		2–0	3–0	1–1	1–0	2–3	2–0
Al-Safa	2–2	0–1	0–3	1–4	3–2	2–1	1–2	1–4	3–2	1–2	0–1	0–1		1–4	0–0	0–2	1–3	3–0
Al-Tai	2–1	1–2	3–2	1–1	5–0	0–0	0–1	1–2	0–2	1–0	1–0	0–3	3–0		3–0	1–1	0–1	2–1
Al-Zulfi	3–0	0–0	2–1	0–0	2–0	1–1	1–0	0–1	0–0	1–0	0–1	2–0	3–3	2–3		0–2	2–1	2–0
Jeddah	0–0	1–0	1–1	2–2	1–0	0–2	2–3	1–1	0–0	1–0	1–1	0–1	1–1	0–0	3–0		0–6	1–0
Neom	2–2	2–2	1–1	3–1	0–0	2–0	4–1	2–0	1–1	4–0	2–2	2–0	5–1	3–1	2–2	2–1		1–0
Ohod	0–1	2–4	1–2	1–3	0–2	0–2	3–2	1–3	2–0	0–1	1–2	1–1	2–0	1–2	3–2	1–2	0–1	

Updated to match(es) played on 18 May 2025. Source: goalzz.com
Legend: Blue = home team win; Yellow = draw; Red = away team win.

== Promotion play-offs ==
Semi-finals
3	Al-Hazem	1
6	Al-Tai	0
4	Al-Adalah	0 (5)
5	Al-Bukiryah	0 (4)

Final
3	Al-Hazem	3
4	Al-Adalah	0

=== Semi-finals ===
23 May 2025
19:00

Al-Adalah	0–0 (a.e.t.)	Al-Bukiryah
	Report
Penalties
Cariús (penalty scored); Al-Salem (penalty scored); Al-Hujaili (penalty scored); E. Al-Biladi (penalty scored); Maia (penalty scored)	5–4	(penalty scored) Al-Shuwayyi; (penalty scored) Faik; (penalty scored) Al-Nakhli; (penalty scored) Al-Zaid; (penalty missed) Luvannor

Prince Abdullah bin Jalawi Stadium, Al-Hasa
Attendance: 5,350
Referee: Majed Al-Shamrani
23 May 2025
21:00

Al-Hazem	1–0	Al-Tai
Yoda 66'	Report

Al-Hazem Club Stadium, Ar Rass
Attendance: 3,031
Referee: Khalid Al-Turais

=== Final ===
29 May 2025
21:00

Al-Hazem	3–0	Al-Adalah
Al-Dakheel 21'; Gano 48'; Al-Sayyali 72'	Report

Al-Hazem Club Stadium, Ar Rass
Attendance: 5,023
Referee: Faisal Al-Blwi

== Statistics ==
As of 18 May 2025

=== Scoring ===
==== Top scorers ====
Rank	Player	Club	Goals
1	(Brazil) Alan Cariús	Al-Adalah	20
2	(Brazil) Vina	Al-Jubail	16
3	(Guinea-Bissau) Zinho Gano	Al-Hazem	15
3	(Eritrea) Ahmed Abdu Jaber	Abha/Neom	15
3	(Brazil) Carlos	Neom	15
6	(Romania) Andrei Cordea	Al-Tai	14
6	(Senegal) Mbaye Diagne	Neom	14
6	(Moldova) Henrique Luvannor	Al-Bukiryah	14
9	(Honduras) Romell Quioto	Al-Arabi	13
10	(Brazil) Léo Tilica	Al-Najma	12
10	(Netherlands) Sylla Sow	Al-Najma	12

==== Hat-tricks ====
Player	For	Against	Result	Date	Ref.
(Eritrea) Ahmed Abdu Jaber	Abha	Al-Faisaly	3–1 (H)	1 October 2024	
(Brazil) Alan Cariús	Al-Adalah	Al-Faisaly	3–3 (H)	28 January 2025	
(Senegal) Ablaye Mbengue	Al-Arabi	Al-Jabalain	3–3 (A)	11 February 2025	
(Brazil) Carlos^{4}	Neom	Al-Batin	7–2 (A)	8 April 2025	
(Romania) Andrei Cordea	Al-Tai	Al-Zulfi	3–0 (H)	6 May 2025	

Note

(H) – Home; (A) – Away
^{4} Player scored 4 goals

=== Clean sheets ===
Rank	Player	Club	Clean sheets
1	(Lithuania) Džiugas Bartkus	Al-Bukiryah	16
1	(Saudi Arabia) Mustafa Malayekah	Neom	16
3	(Saudi Arabia) Saad Al-Saleh	Al-Zulfi	13
3	(Brazil) Max Walef	Al-Najmah	13
3	(Saudi Arabia) Moataz Al-Baqaawi	Al-Tai	13
6	(Brazil) Marcelo Carné	Al-Jabalain	11
7	(Portugal) Emanuel Novo	Al-Jandal	9
8	(Saudi Arabia) Abdullah Al-Jadaani	Abha	8
9	(Saudi Arabia) Yasser Al-Mosailem	Jeddah	7
10	(Saudi Arabia) Meshal Hariss	Al-Batin	6
10	(Saudi Arabia) Ibrahim Zaid	Al-Hazem	6
10	(Brazil) Rafael Martins	Al-Jubail	6
10	(Bosnia and Herzegovina) Slaviša Bogdanović	Al-Ain	6

== Awards ==
=== Round awards ===
Round	Player of the Round		Reference
Round	Player	Club	Reference
Round 1	(Spain) Agi Dambelley	Al-Najma	
Round 2	(Eritrea) Ahmed Abdu Jaber	Abha	
Round 3	(Saudi Arabia) Ammar Al-Najjar	Jeddah	
Round 4	(Saudi Arabia) Ammar Al-Najjar	Jeddah	
Round 5	(Eritrea) Ahmed Abdu Jaber	Abha	
Round 6	(Saudi Arabia) Salman Al-Faraj	Neom	
Round 7	(Saudi Arabia) Moataz Al-Baqaawi	Al-Tai	
Round 8	(Brazil) Vina	Al-Jubail	
Round 9	(Honduras) Romell Quioto	Al-Arabi	
Round 11	(Brazil) Fabinho	Al-Safa	
Round 12	(Romania) Andrei Cordea	Al-Tai	
Round 13	(Guinea-Bissau) Zinho Gano	Al-Hazem	
Round 15	(Brazil) Alan Cariús	Al-Adalah	
Round 16	(Saudi Arabia) Abdulmohsen Al-Burayk	Al-Safa	
Round 18	(Senegal) Ibrahima Ndiaye	Al-Hazem	
Round 19	(Brazil) Alan Cariús	Al-Adalah	
Round 20	(Saudi Arabia) Ibrahim Al-Harbi	Al-Jandal	
Round 21	(Senegal) Ablaye Mbengue	Al-Arabi	
Round 22	(Saudi Arabia) Abdulaziz Al-Sharid	Al-Bukiryah	
Round 23	(Brazil) Vina	Al-Jubail	
Round 24	(Guinea-Bissau) Alfa Semedo	Neom	
Round 25	(Guinea-Bissau) Zinho Gano	Al-Hazem	
Round 26	(Saudi Arabia) Freej Al-Jizani	Ohod	
Round 27	(Algeria) Saïd Benrahma	Neom	
Round 28	(Brazil) Carlos Júnior	Neom	
Round 29	(Brazil) Alan Cariús	Al-Adalah	
Round 30	(Brazil) Léo Tilica	Al-Najma	
Round 31	(Romania) Andrei Cordea	Al-Tai	
Round 32	(Romania) Andrei Cordea	Al-Tai	
Round 33	(France) Karim Yoda	Al-Hazem	
Round 34	(Saudi Arabia) Nawaf Al-Habashi	Al-Hazem	

== Number of teams by province ==
Rank	Province	Number	Teams
1	Al-Qassim	4	Al-Arabi, Al-Bukiryah, Al-Hazem and Al-Najma
1	Eastern Province	4	Al-Adalah, Al-Batin, Al-Jubail and Al-Safa
3	Ha'il	2	Al-Jabalain and Al-Tai
3	Riyadh	2	Al-Faisaly and Al-Zulfi
5	Al-Bahah	1	Al-Ain
5	Al-Jawf	1	Al-Jandal
5	Asir	1	Abha
5	Mecca	1	Jeddah
5	Medina	1	Ohod
5	Tabuk	1	Neom

== See also ==
- 2024–25 Saudi Pro League
- 2024–25 Saudi Second Division League
- 2024–25 Saudi Third Division
