= 2023–24 Saudi First Division League =

First Division League
- Season: 2023–24
- Dates: 14 August 2023 – 28 May 2024
- Champions: Al-Qadsiah (4th title)
- Promoted: Al-Qadsiah; Al-Orobah; Al-Kholood
- Relegated: Al-Qaisumah; Hajer; Al-Taraji
- Matches: 306
- Goals: 816 (2.67 per match)
- Top goalscorer: Mbaye Diagne (26 goals)
- Biggest home win: Al-Arabi 6–0 Al-Taraji (14 May 2024)
- Biggest away win: Al-Batin 0–5 Al-Kholood (3 September 2023)
- Highest scoring: Al-Safa 4–6 Al-Qadsiah (10 January 2024)
- Longest winning run: Al-Orobah (8 matches)
- Longest unbeaten run: Al-Safa (15 matches)
- Longest winless run: Al-Taraji (16 matches)
- Longest losing run: Al-Safa (6 matches)
- All statistics correct as of 28 May 2024.

The 2023–24 First Division League (known as the Yelo League for sponsorship reasons) was the third season of the Saudi First Division League after its rebrand, and the 47th season of the Saudi First Division since its establishment in 1976. The season started on 14 August 2023 and concluded on 28 May 2024.

On 6 May, Al-Qadsiah became the first team to be promoted following a 2–2 draw with Ohod. They were crowned champions following a 4–2 win against Al-Najma on 13 May. On 21 May, Al-Kholood and Al-Orobah became the final two clubs to be promoted following wins over Al-Safa and Al-Jabalain respectively.

On 30 April, Al-Taraji became the first team to be relegated after a 4–1 defeat away to Al-Kholood. On 13 May, Hajer became the second team to be relegated following a 2–1 defeat to Al-Faisaly. On 15 May, Al-Qaisumah became the third and the final club to be relegated following a 0–0 draw with Ohod.

== Team changes ==
The following teams have changed division since the 2022–23 season.

=== To the First Division League ===
Promoted from Second Division

- Al-Najma
- Al-Taraji
- Al-Bukiryah
- Al-Safa
- Al-Jandal

Relegated from Pro League

- Al-Adalah
- Al-Batin

=== From the First Division League ===
Promoted to Pro League

- Al-Ahli
- Al-Hazem
- Al-Okhdood
- Al-Riyadh

Relegated to Second Division

- Najran
- Al-Sahel
- Al-Shoulla

== Teams ==
A total of 18 teams are contesting the league, including 11 sides from the 2022–23 season, the five promoted teams from the Second Division and the two relegated sides from the Pro League.

Al-Batin were the first club to be relegated following a 1–0 defeat away to Al-Ittihad on 23 May 2023. Al-Batin were relegated after three years in the top flight. Al-Adalah were the second and final club to be relegated following a 2–0 home defeat to Al-Ettifaq on the final matchday. Al-Adalah were relegated after just one year in the top flight. Both Al-Adalah and Al-Batin will play in their 7th season in the FD League.

The first club to be promoted was Al-Najma who did so after a 1–1 draw against Al-Kawkab on 17 March 2023. On 24 March 2023, Al-Taraji became the second club to be promoted despite a 1–0 defeat to Al-Bukiryah. On 31 March 2023, Al-Bukiryah became the third club to be promoted following a 1–0 home win against Al-Diriyah. On 8 April 2023, Al-Safa became the fourth club to be promoted following a 2–1 home win against Wej. The fifth and final club to be promoted was Al-Jandal, who did so following a 4–2 aggregate win over Bisha in the promotion play-offs.

Al-Najma were crowned champions after defeating Al-Taraji 2–1 to win their third title and first since 2010.

Al-Najma return to the First Division League after an absence of 10 years. They return to the league for the first time since the 2012–13 season and will play in their 11th overall season. Al-Bukiryah return after an absence of two seasons and will play in their 3rd overall season in the First Division League. Al-Safa return after an absence of eight years and will play in their 2nd overall season in the First Division League. Both Al-Taraji and Al-Jandal were promoted to the First Division League for the first time in history.

=== Stadium and locations ===
Locations of teams in the 2023–24 First Division League

Note: Table lists in alphabetical order.

Team	Location	Stadium	Capacity
Al-Adalah	Al-Hasa (Al-Hulaylah)	Prince Abdullah bin Jalawi Stadium; Hajer Club Stadium	26,000; 12,000
Al-Ain	Al Bahah	King Saud Sport City Stadium	10,000
Al-Arabi	Unaizah	Department of Education Stadium	10,000
Al-Batin	Hafar al-Batin	Al-Batin Club Stadium	6,000
Al-Bukiryah	Al Bukayriyah	Al-Bukiryah Club Stadium	5,000
Al-Faisaly	Harmah	Al Majma'ah Sports City (Al Majma'ah)	7,000
Al-Jabalain	Ha'il	Prince Abdul Aziz bin Musa'ed Stadium	12,250
Al-Jandal	Dumat al-Jandal	Al-Orobah Club Stadium (Sakakah)	7,000
Al-Kholood	Ar Rass	Al-Hazem Club Stadium	8,000
Al-Najma	Unaizah	Department of Education Stadium; Al-Najma Club Stadium	10,000; 7,000
Al-Orobah	Sakakah	Al-Orobah Club Stadium	7,000
Al-Qadsiah	Khobar	Prince Saud bin Jalawi Stadium	15,000
Al-Qaisumah	Qaisumah	Al-Batin Club Stadium (Hafar al-Batin)	6,000
Al-Safa	Safwa	Al-Safa Club Stadium; Prince Saud bin Jalawi Stadium (Khobar); Prince Mohamed bin Fahd Stadium (Dammam)	3,000; 15,000; 26,000
Al-Taraji	Qatif	Prince Nayef bin Abdulaziz Stadium; Prince Saud bin Jalawi Stadium (Khobar)	12,000; 15,000
Hajer	Al-Hasa (Hofuf)	Hajer Club Stadium	12,000
Jeddah	Jeddah	Prince Abdullah Al-Faisal Stadium; Sports Hall at King Abdullah Sports City	27,000; 1,000
Ohod	Medina	Ohod Club Stadium	5,000

=== Personnel and kits ===
Team	Manager	Captain	Kit manufacturer	Shirt sponsor
Al-Adalah	(Netherlands) Roel Coumans	(Saudi Arabia) Abdullah Al-Yousef	Al-Adalah	Yelo
Al-Ain	(Serbia) Zoran Milinković	(Chad) Othman Maloum	Zat Outfit	Yelo
Al-Arabi	(Saudi Arabia) Yousef Anbar	(Saudi Arabia) Ahmed Al-Muwallad	Kelme	Naqi Water, Yelo
Al-Batin	(North Macedonia) Gjore Jovanovski	(Morocco) Zakaria Lahlali	Skillano	Yelo, Almaali Hospital^{2}
Al-Bukiryah	(Saudi Arabia) Khalil Al-Masri	(Netherlands) Hicham Faik	RightAway Sport	Yelo, Advanced Energy, Entaj^{1}
Al-Faisaly	(Brazil) Marcelo Chamusca	(Saudi Arabia) Yassin Barnawi	Adidas	Aldrees, Yelo
Al-Jabalain	(Tunisia) Nacif Beyaoui	(Jordan) Yazid Abu Layla	Envision	Abar, Yelo, AlAhli Medical^{2}
Al-Jandal	(Saudi Arabia) Ziyad Al-Afar	(Saudi Arabia) Humood Bakr	Skillano	Yelo
Al-Kholood	(Portugal) Fabiano Flora	(Saudi Arabia) Tareq Al-Kaebi	In-House	Yelo, Wav Water^{2}
Al-Najma	(Italy) Giovanni Solinas	(Saudi Arabia) Ziyad Al-Qahtani	Offside	Yelo, Kyan
Al-Orobah	(Bosnia and Herzegovina) Rusmir Cviko	(Saudi Arabia) Rafea Al-Ruwaili	Offside	Yelo
Al-Qadsiah	(Spain) Míchel	(Spain) Joel Robles	Macron	
Al-Qaisumah	(Tunisia) Sabri Kaouech	(Saudi Arabia) Sultan Ghunaiman	Copa	Yelo
Al-Safa	(France) Laurent Hagist	(Saudi Arabia) Dawod Al Saeed	Terio	Yelo
Al-Taraji	(Tunisia) Anis Rebai	(Saudi Arabia) Abdulmajeed Haddadi	Laser	Yelo
Hajer	(Saudi Arabia) Abdullah Al-Janoubi	(Saudi Arabia) Hassan Jaafari	Offside	Yelo
Jeddah	(Kuwait) Maher Al-Shammari	(Somalia) Faisal Abu Bakr	Skillano	Yelo
Ohod	(Croatia) Damir Burić	(Saudi Arabia) Salem Qabbos	Offside	Yelo

- ^{1} On the back of the strip.
- ^{2} On the right sleeve of the strip.
- ^{3} On the shorts.

=== Foreign players ===
On 1 June 2023, the Saudi FF announced that the number of foreign players was increased from 6 players to 7 players.

- Players name in **bold** indicates the player is registered during the mid-season transfer window.
- Players in italics were out of the squad or left the club within the season, after the pre-season transfer window, or in the mid-season transfer window, and at least had one appearance.

Club	Player 1	Player 2	Player 3	Player 4	Player 5	Player 6	Player 7	Former Players
Al-Adalah	(Brazil) Philipe Maia	(Cameroon) **Donovan Ewolo**	(France) Karim Yoda	(Greece) Theofanis Mavrommatis	(Mali) Moussa Doumbia	(Slovenia) **David Tijanić**	(Togo) Samsondin Ouro	(Peru) Christofer Gonzáles (Romania) Alexandru Tudorie
Al-Ain	(Brazil) Bruno Grassi	(Cape Verde) Dodô	(Chad) Othman Maloum	(Ivory Coast) Mohamed Ouattara	(Ivory Coast) Daouda Sylla	(Nigeria) Erhun Obanor	(Nigeria) Anthony Okpotu	
Al-Arabi	(Brazil) Jobson	(Brazil) Diego Miranda	(Brazil) Muralha	(Honduras) **Romell Quioto**	(Ivory Coast) Cheick Comara	(Netherlands) Ola John	(Senegal) Ablaye Mbengue	(Tunisia) Khemais Maaouani
Al-Batin	(Algeria) **Okacha Hamzaoui**	(France) Thibault Peyre	(Ghana) Isaac Sackey	(Ivory Coast) Mamadou Soro	(Morocco) Amine Atouchi	(Morocco) Zakaria Lahlali	(Morocco) Abdelali Mhamdi	(Uruguay) Brahian Alemán
Al-Bukiryah	(Argentina) **Fernando Piñero**	(Ghana) Salifu Mudasiru	(Moldova) **Henrique Luvannor**	(Morocco) Zakaria Fati	(Morocco) Ayoub Lakhdar	(Netherlands) Hicham Faik	(Serbia) Nikola Petrić	(Cameroon) Serge Tabekou (Netherlands) Reda Kharchouch (Serbia) Nebojša Bastajić
Al-Faisaly	(Brazil) Morato	(Brazil) Lucas Souza	(Cameroon) Paul Garita	(Germany) Joy-Lance Mickels	(Morocco) Mohamed Cheikhi	(Portugal) Vladimir Stojković	(Tunisia) Larry Azouni	
Al-Jabalain	(Brazil) Nailson	(Jordan) Yazid Abu Layla	(Morocco) Iliass Bel Hassani	(Netherlands) Mohamed Rayhi	(Senegal) **Mamadou Thiam**	(Serbia) Miodrag Gemović	(Spain) Israel Puerto	(Kenya) Masoud Juma
Al-Jandal	(Brazil) Tony Batista	(Brazil) Leandrinho	(Egypt) **Camacho**	(Ivory Coast) **Senin Sebai**	(Panama) Cristian Martínez	(Spain) Agi Dambelley	(Tunisia) Sabri Zaidi	(Brazil) Róbson (Morocco) Sofian El Moudane (Nigeria) Austin Amutu
Al-Kholood	(Argentina) Mariano Vázquez	(Brazil) Roberto Dias	(Brazil) Rafael Martins	(Brazil) Arthur Rezende	(Iraq) Ahmed Yasin	(Portugal) Afonso Taira	(Serbia) **Nikola Stojiljković**	(Sweden) Samuel Armenteros
Al-Najma	(Algeria) Farid Chaâl	(Brazil) Alan Cariús	(Brazil) **Wellington Silva**	(Brazil) Léo Tilica	(Portugal) **Hernâni Fortes**	(Tanzania) **Simon Msuva**	(Venezuela) **Luis Mago**	(Algeria) Ayoub Azzi (Albania) Idriz Batha (Guinea) Ousmane Barry (Guinea-Bissau) Ença Fati
Al-Orobah	(Albania) **Rubin Hebaj**	(Australia) Connor Pain	(Brazil) Matheus Duarte	(Curaçao) Vurnon Anita	(France) Béni Nkololo	(Lithuania) Džiugas Bartkus	(Netherlands) Mounir El Allouchi	(Brazil) Tiago Bezerra
Al-Qadsiah	(Argentina) Luciano Vietto	(Germany) Alexander Hack	(Peru) André Carrillo	(Portugal) **Kévin Rodrigues**	(Senegal) Mbaye Diagne	(Spain) Álvaro González	(Spain) Joel Robles	(England) Max Power
Al-Qaisumah	(Angola) Elliot Simões	(Brazil) Lucas Dias	(Burkina Faso) Souleymane Sakandé	(Ghana) Sadat Karim	(Portugal) Sandro Sakho			(Bosnia and Herzegovina) Slaviša Bogdanović (Brazil) Jefferson (Ecuador) Jeison Chalá
Al-Safa	(Brazil) Fabinho	(Brazil) Maicon	(Brazil) Kaká Mendes	(Brazil) Reinaldo	(Mali) Hamidou Traoré	(Mali) **Daouda Toure**	(Tunisia) Borhane Hakimi	(Colombia) Victor Arboleda (Ghana) Denny Antwi (Nigeria) Usman Sale (Tunisia) Malek Miladi
Al-Taraji	(Benin) Rodrigue Kossi	(Germany) Leroy-Jacques Mickels	(Ghana) Samuel Sarfo	(Ivory Coast) Mohamed Aidara				(Brazil) Roger (Cameroon) Alain Akono (Portugal) Emanuel Novo
Hajer	(Cameroon) Clarence Bitang	(Croatia) Nikola Jambor	(Morocco) **Reda Hajhouj**	(Netherlands) **Youssef El Jebli**	(Netherlands) **Reda Kharchouch**	(North Macedonia) **Konstantin Cheshmedjiev**	(Senegal) Bakary Coulibaly	(Algeria) Abderrahmane Bourdim (Austria) Srđan Spiridonović (Brazil) Adriano Pardal (Cameroon) Ronald Ngah (Serbia) Miloš Krunić
Jeddah	(Algeria) Rédha Bensayah	(Algeria) Khaled Nèche	(Cameroon) Ngweni Ndassi	(Gabon) Medwin Biteghé	(Somalia) Faisal Abu Bakr	(Tunisia) Aziz Chtioui		(Algeria) Hamid Djaouchi
Ohod	(Algeria) Karim Aribi	(Algeria) Haris Belkebla	(Algeria) Ryad Boudebouz	(Morocco) Mohamed Kamal	(Poland) Konrad Michalak	(Uruguay) Nicolás Milesi	(Zimbabwe) Gerald Takwara	(Angola) Jonás Ramalho (Iraq) Hussein Jabbar (Paraguay) César Meza Colli (Paraguay) David Meza

== League table ==
Pos	Team	Pld	W	D	L	GF	GA	GD	Pts	Promotion, qualification or relegation
1	Al-Qadsiah (C, P)	34	22	7	5	64	29	+35	73	Promotion to the Pro League
2	Al-Orobah (P)	34	20	4	10	48	33	+15	64	Promotion to the Pro League
3	Al-Kholood (P)	34	18	8	8	55	30	+25	62	Promotion to the Pro League
4	Al-Arabi	34	17	8	9	65	37	+28	59	
5	Al-Adalah	34	15	13	6	52	40	+12	58	
6	Al-Faisaly	34	16	5	13	49	46	+3	53	
7	Al-Batin (Note: Al-Batin were awarded a 3–0 win over Al-Ain due to Al-Ain's inability to hold the fixture. In addition, Al-Ain were deducted 3 points for the same reason.)	34	14	9	11	46	41	+5	51	
8	Al-Jabalain	34	12	11	11	41	43	−2	47	
9	Al-Najma	34	12	10	12	53	51	+2	46	
10	Al-Safa	34	12	8	14	48	52	−4	44	
11	Al-Jandal	34	12	7	15	36	49	−13	43	
12	Jeddah	34	11	9	14	47	55	−8	42	
13	Al-Ain	34	10	14	10	41	44	−3	41	
14	Al-Bukiryah	34	9	10	15	34	44	−10	37	
15	Ohod	34	7	14	13	35	41	−6	35	
16	Hajer (R)	34	5	13	16	31	54	−23	28 (Note: Hajer finished ahead of Al-Qaisumah on head-to-head points: Hajer: 6 pts, Al-Qaisumah: 0 pts (Hajer 1–0 Al-Qaisumah, Al-Qaisumah 2–3 Hajer).)	Relegation to the Second Division
17	Al-Qaisumah (R)	34	7	7	20	43	61	−18	28	Relegation to the Second Division
18	Al-Taraji (R)	34	4	9	21	28	66	−38	21	Relegation to the Second Division

Source: goalzz.com
Rules for classification: 1) Points; 2) Head-to-head points; 3) Head-to-head goal difference; 4) Total goal difference; 5) Total goals scored; 6) Fair-play points
(Note: Head-to-head record is used only after all the matches between the teams in question have been played).
(C) Champions; (P) Promoted; (R) Relegated

== Positions by round ==
The table lists the positions of teams after each week of matches. In order to preserve chronological evolution, any postponed matches are not included in the round at which they were originally scheduled but added to the full round they were played immediately afterward.

Team ╲ Round	1	2	3	4	5	6	7	8	9	10	11	12	13	14	15	16	17	18	19	20	21	22	23	24	25	26	27	28	29	30	31	32	33	34
Al-Qadsiah	6	4	2	3	2	1	2	2	3	3	3	2	1	1	1	1	1	1	1	1	1	1	1	1	1	1	1	1	1	1	1	1	1	1
Al-Orobah	2	5	5	4	4	2	1	1	1	1	1	1	2	3	2	3	4	5	5	5	4	3	2	2	2	2	2	3	2	3	2	3	3	2
Al-Kholood	14	13	15	11	8	7	7	10	10	7	6	5	6	7	5	5	3	3	3	2	2	2	3	3	4	4	4	2	3	2	3	2	2	3
Al-Arabi	5	1	3	1	1	4	5	7	7	9	11	10	11	10	9	6	6	6	6	6	7	7	5	4	3	3	3	4	4	4	5	4	5	4
Al-Adalah	12	10	8	6	5	3	3	3	2	2	2	3	3	2	3	4	5	4	4	3	6	6	7	7	6	5	5	5	5	5	4	5	4	5
Al-Faisaly	1	2	1	5	3	6	6	4	6	6	5	6	5	6	6	7	8	7	7	7	5	5	6	5	5	7	8	6	6	6	6	6	6	6
Al-Batin	10	7	9	10	10	9	10	11	11	12	10	9	8	8	8	9	9	8	8	8	8	8	9	8	8	8	7	8	7	7	8	7	7	7
Al-Jabalain	7	3	4	2	6	5	4	6	4	4	4	4	4	4	4	2	2	2	2	4	3	4	4	6	7	6	6	7	8	9	7	8	8	8
Al-Najma	9	12	13	15	11	13	11	9	9	11	9	8	9	11	11	11	11	10	11	10	10	10	8	9	9	9	9	9	9	8	9	9	9	9
Al-Safa	16	15	17	18	18	18	17	17	18	16	16	16	16	15	17	16	18	17	15	14	14	14	14	14	13	11	10	10	10	10	10	10	10	10
Al-Jandal	18	17	16	12	13	12	14	13	12	8	12	12	10	9	10	10	7	9	9	9	9	9	10	10	10	10	12	11	11	11	11	11	11	11
Jeddah	13	9	10	9	9	11	9	8	8	10	8	7	7	5	7	8	10	11	10	11	11	12	13	13	14	12	11	12	13	14	13	13	13	12
Al-Ain	11	8	11	17	12	10	12	14	15	15	15	14	15	14	14	14	14	14	14	15	15	15	15	15	15	15	14	13	12	12	12	12	12	13
Al-Bukiryah	4	6	6	7	7	8	8	5	5	5	7	11	12	12	12	13	13	13	13	13	12	11	11	11	12	14	15	14	14	13	14	14	14	14
Ohod	3	11	7	8	15	16	15	15	14	13	13	13	13	13	13	12	12	12	12	12	13	13	12	12	11	13	13	15	15	15	15	15	15	15
Hajer	15	18	12	14	14	15	16	16	17	17	17	17	17	17	15	18	15	16	17	17	17	16	17	16	17	16	16	16	17	16	16	17	17	16
Al-Qaisumah	8	14	14	16	17	17	18	18	16	18	18	18	18	18	18	15	16	18	18	18	18	18	16	17	16	17	17	17	16	17	17	16	16	17
Al-Taraji	17	16	18	13	16	14	13	12	13	14	14	15	14	16	16	17	17	15	16	16	16	17	18	18	18	18	18	18	18	18	18	18	18	18

Leader
Promotion to the Pro League
Relegation to the Second Division

Updated to match(es) played on 28 May 2024. Source:

== Results ==
Home \ Away	ADA	AIN	ARB	BAT	BUK	FSY	JAB	JAN	KHO	NAJ	ORO	QAD	QAI	SAF	TAR	HJR	JED	OHD
Al-Adalah		1–1	2–2	0–1	3–2	4–2	2–1	2–0	0–1	2–2	1–0	1–0	3–2	1–1	1–1	1–1	1–0	2–0
Al-Ain	1–1		1–1	2–3	1–0	3–4	1–1	3–2	2–1	2–2	0–3	0–0	2–2	4–1	1–0	3–1	3–1	1–3
Al-Arabi	1–2	2–2		3–0	2–1	3–0	1–0	1–2	1–2	5–2	3–1	3–1	4–2	0–1	6–0	4–0	2–1	3–2
Al-Batin	1–2	3–0	1–1		0–0	2–2	0–0	2–1	0–5	0–1	0–1	1–0	2–3	1–2	1–0	1–1	3–1	3–1
Al-Bukiryah	2–2	0–0	1–1	1–2		0–0	1–0	2–3	2–1	1–1	0–0	1–1	1–0	2–0	2–1	2–2	3–2	1–0
Al-Faisaly	2–0	0–2	2–1	1–3	5–2		2–0	3–0	0–3	1–2	1–2	0–1	2–1	2–0	2–0	2–1	1–4	1–0
Al-Jabalain	1–2	1–0	3–3	2–2	2–1	1–1		2–0	1–0	0–2	1–0	0–3	2–1	4–1	3–0	2–1	1–0	1–1
Al-Jandal	1–1	1–0	1–3	1–4	2–0	0–1	1–0		1–2	3–2	3–0	0–1	1–0	2–1	2–1	0–0	1–4	1–1
Al-Kholood	1–1	0–0	0–1	1–1	2–0	1–0	1–1	1–0		2–2	3–1	0–2	3–1	2–1	4–1	2–2	2–1	2–0
Al-Najma	1–3	0–1	2–1	0–1	3–1	0–2	3–0	3–1	0–1		0–0	0–3	0–0	1–1	1–0	1–1	2–4	3–0
Al-Orobah	0–0	4–1	1–0	1–0	1–0	2–2	1–0	0–2	1–0	3–4		1–0	1–0	0–2	3–0	3–1	1–2	2–1
Al-Qadsiah	2–1	2–0	2–1	2–1	2–1	2–1	1–1	0–0	2–0	4–2	1–3		3–1	1–0	1–0	3–0	3–3	1–1
Al-Qaisumah	3–1	1–2	0–0	2–2	1–0	1–2	1–2	1–1	3–2	0–1	1–3	0–4		1–3	3–1	2–3	2–3	0–0
Al-Safa	3–2	0–0	0–3	0–1	2–1	3–1	5–1	0–0	1–5	1–1	0–1	4–6	4–1		4–1	2–0	2–2	0–1
Al-Taraji	2–4	2–1	0–1	0–3	0–0	0–1	2–2	1–1	0–0	3–2	2–1	0–3	1–3	0–1		2–2	1–2	1–1
Hajer	1–1	0–0	0–1	0–0	0–1	1–1	0–2	3–1	1–1	0–4	1–4	0–2	1–0	2–0	1–2		0–0	0–2
Jeddah	0–1	1–1	1–1	1–0	2–1	1–0	3–3	0–1	0–3	2–1	0–1	0–3	0–3	1–1	2–2	0–3		1–1
Ohod	1–1	0–0	1–0	3–1	0–1	0–2	0–0	4–0	0–1	2–2	1–2	2–2	1–1	1–1	1–1	2–1	1–2	

Source: goalzz.com
Legend: Blue = home team win; Yellow = draw; Red = away team win.

== Statistics ==
As of 28 May 2024

=== Scoring ===
==== Top scorers ====
Rank	Player	Club	Goals
1	(Senegal) Mbaye Diagne	Al-Qadsiah	26
2	(Argentina) Luciano Vietto	Al-Qadsiah	17
2	(Nigeria) Anthony Okpotu	Al-Ain	17
4	(Algeria) Rédha Bensayah	Jeddah	16
5	(Senegal) Ablaye Mbengue	Al-Arabi	14
5	(Brazil) Lucas Souza	Al-Faisaly	14
5	(Ghana) Sadat Karim	Al-Qaisumah	14
8	(Guinea) Ousmane Barry	Al-Najma	13
8	(Saudi Arabia) Hisham Al Dubais	Al-Jabalain	13
10	(Spain) Agi Dambelley	Al-Jandal	12
10	(Cameroon) Paul Garita	Al-Faisaly	12

==== Hat-tricks ====
Player	For	Against	Result	Date	Ref.
(Brazil) Muralha	Al-Arabi	Al-Qaisumah	4–2 (H)	3 September 2023	
(Brazil) Lucas Souza	Al-Faisaly	Al-Ain	4–3 (A)	13 December 2023	
(Senegal) Mbaye Diagne	Al-Qadsiah	Al-Qaisumah	3–1 (H)	30 April 2024	
(Senegal) Mbaye Diagne	Al-Qadsiah	Al-Najma	4–2 (H)	13 May 2024	
(Honduras) Romell Quioto	Al-Arabi	Al-Taraji	6–0 (H)	14 May 2024	
(Saudi Arabia) Hussain Al-Moeini	Jeddah	Al-Jandal	4–1 (A)	28 May 2024	

Note

(H) – Home; (A) – Away

=== Clean sheets ===
Rank	Player	Club	Clean sheets
1	(Lithuania) Džiugas Bartkus	Al-Orobah	15
1	(Spain) Joel Robles	Al-Qadsiah	15
3	(Brazil) Rafael Martins	Al-Kholood	11
3	(Serbia) Nikola Petrić	Al-Bukiryah	11
5	(Portugal) Vladimir Stojković	Al-Faisaly	10
5	(Brazil) Tony Batista	Al-Jandal	10
7	(Morocco) Abdelali Mhamdi	Al-Batin	9
7	(Brazil) Bruno Grassi	Al-Ain	9
9	(Algeria) Farid Chaâl	Al-Najma	8
10	(Saudi Arabia) Abdulrahman Al-Shammari	Al-Arabi	7

== Awards ==
=== Monthly awards ===
Month	Manager of the Month		Reference
Month	Manager	Club	Reference
August & September	(England) Robbie Fowler	Al-Qadsiah	
October	(Bosnia and Herzegovina) Rusmir Cviko	Al-Orobah	
November	(Portugal) Fabiano Flora	Al-Kholood	
December	(Spain) Míchel	Al-Qadsiah	

=== Round awards ===
Round	Player of the Round		Reference
Round	Player	Club	Reference
Round 1	(Australia) Connor Pain	Al-Orobah	
Round 2	(Netherlands) Ola John	Al-Arabi	
Round 3	(Senegal) Ablaye Mbengue	Al-Arabi	
Round 4	(Brazil) Muralha	Al-Arabi	
Round 5	(Brazil) Morato	Al-Faisaly	
Round 6	(Saudi Arabia) Sattam Al-Tambakti	Al-Ain	
Round 7	(Brazil) Fabinho	Al-Safa	
Round 8	(Algeria) Rédha Bensayah	Jeddah	
Round 9	(Netherlands) Mohamed Rayhi	Al-Jabalain	
Round 10	(Argentina) Luciano Vietto	Al-Qadsiah	
Round 11	(Saudi Arabia) Faisal Al-Mutairi	Al-Najma	
Round 12	(Senegal) Ablaye Mbengue	Al-Arabi	
Round 13	(Brazil) Lucas Souza	Al-Faisaly	
Round 14	(Algeria) Rédha Bensayah	Jeddah	
Round 15	(Iraq) Ahmed Yasin	Al-Kholood	
Round 16	(Brazil) Lucas Dias	Al-Qaisumah	
Round 17	(Morocco) Abdelali Mhamdi	Al-Batin	
Round 18	(Portugal) Vladimir Stojković	Al-Faisaly	
Round 19	(Saudi Arabia) Hisham Al Dubais	Al-Jabalain	
Round 20	(Brazil) Alan Cariús	Al-Najma	
Round 21	(Morocco) Ayoub Lakhdar	Al-Bukiryah	
Round 22	(Argentina) Luciano Vietto	Al-Qadsiah	
Round 23	(Algeria) Rédha Bensayah	Jeddah	
Round 24	(Germany) Joy-Lance Mickels	Al-Faisaly	
Round 25	(Algeria) Okacha Hamzaoui	Al-Batin	
Round 26	(Saudi Arabia) Sultan Al-Shehri	Al-Kholood	
Round 27	(Brazil) Reinaldo	Al-Safa	
Round 28	(Saudi Arabia) Mohammad Al-Sahlawi	Al-Safa	
Round 29	(Algeria) Okacha Hamzaoui	Al-Batin	
Round 30	(Senegal) Mbaye Diagne	Al-Qadsiah	
Round 31	(Saudi Arabia) Zeyad Al-Hunayti	Al-Orobah	
Round 32	(Tunisia) Borhane Hakimi	Al-Safa	
Round 33	(Lithuania) Džiugas Bartkus	Al-Orobah	
Round 34	(Saudi Arabia) Hussain Al-Moeini	Jeddah	

== Number of teams by province ==
Rank	Province	Number	Teams
1	Eastern Province	7	Al-Adalah, Al-Batin, Al-Qadsiah, Al-Qaisumah, Al-Safa, Al-Taraji and Hajer
2	Al-Qassim	4	Al-Arabi, Al-Bukiryah, Al-Kholood and Al-Najma
3	Al-Jawf	2	Al-Jandal and Al-Orobah
4	Al-Bahah	1	Al-Ain
4	Ha'il	1	Al-Jabalain
4	Mecca	1	Jeddah
4	Medina	1	Ohod
4	Riyadh	1	Al-Faisaly

== See also ==
- 2023–24 Saudi Professional League
- 2023–24 Saudi Second Division
- 2023–24 Saudi Third Division
