= 2025–26 Saudi First Division League =

First Division League
- Season: 2025–26
- Dates: 11 September 2025 – 23 May 2026
- Champions: Abha (3rd title)
- Promoted: Abha; Al-Faisaly; Al-Diriyah
- Relegated: Al-Batin; Al-Arabi; Al-Jubail
- Matches: 297
- Goals: 872 (2.94 per match)
- Top goalscorer: Sylla Sow (26 goals)
- Biggest home win: Al-Diriyah 5–0 Al-Wehda (4 February 2026)
- Biggest away win: Al-Wehda 0–5 Al-Ula (13 September 2025); Jeddah 0–5 Al-Diriyah (25 February 2026); Al-Adalah 1–6 Al-Faisaly (2 March 2026)
- Highest scoring: Al-Raed 6–3 Al-Adalah (22 January 2026)
- Longest winning run: Al-Faisaly (7 matches)
- Longest unbeaten run: Al-Faisaly (14 matches)
- Longest winless run: Al-Batin (18 matches)
- Longest losing run: Al-Arabi; Al-Jubail (8 matches)
- Highest attendance: 7,543; Al-Ula 1–2 Abha (9 April 2026)
- Lowest attendance: 10; Jeddah 0–2 Al-Raed (8 April 2026)
- Average attendance: 590
- All statistics correct as of 14 May 2026.

The 2025–26 First Division League (known as the Yelo League for sponsorship reasons) was the fifth season of the Saudi First Division League after its rebrand, and the 69th season of the Saudi First Division since its establishment in 1957. The season began on 11 September 2025 and concluded with the play-off finals on 23 May 2026.

== Overview ==
=== Changes ===
On 29 May 2024, the SAFF announced that foreign goalkeepers would not be allowed to play in the First Division League starting from the 2025–26 season.

=== Team changes ===
The following teams have changed division since the 2024–25 season.

=== To the First Division League ===
Promoted from Second Division

- Al-Diriyah
- Al-Ula
- Al-Anwar

Relegated from Pro League

- Al-Wehda
- Al-Orobah
- Al-Raed

=== From the First Division League ===
Promoted to Pro League

- Neom
- Al-Najma
- Al-Hazem

Relegated to Second Division

- Al-Ain
- Al-Safa
- Ohod

== Teams ==
A total of 18 teams will be contesting the league, including 12 sides from the 2024–25 season, the three promoted teams from the Second Division and the three relegated sides from the Saudi Pro League.

Al-Raed were the first team to be relegated following a 1–0 defeat away to Damac on 11 May 2025. Al-Raed were relegated after 17 consecutive seasons in the flight. On 25 May 2025, Al-Orobah became the second team to be relegated after they were docked three points for fielding an ineligible player against Al-Nassr. Al-Orobah were relegated after one season in the top flight. Al-Wehda were the third and final club to be relegated, following a 2–1 away defeat to Al-Ettifaq on the final matchday. Al-Wehda were relegated after three seasons in the top flight. Al-Raed will play in their 17th season in the FD League, while Al-Orobah will play in their 16th season and Al-Wehda in their 10th season.

The first club to be promoted was Al-Diriyah who did so after a 1–0 away win against Jerash on 10 February 2025. On 14 March 2025, Al-Ula became the second club to be promoted following a 6–0 away win against Bisha. The third and final club to be promoted was Al-Anwar, who did so after defeating Al-Jeel 3–1 on penalties (1–1 after extra time) in the promotion play-off final.

Al-Diriyah were crowned champions for the second time after defeating Al-Ula 1–0 in the final.

Al-Diriyah return to the First Division League after an absence of three years. They return to the league for the first time since the 2021–22 season and will play in their 6th overall season. Both Al-Anwar and Al-Ula were promoted to the First Division League for the first time in history.

=== Stadium and locations ===
Locations of teams in the 2025–26 First Division League

Note: Table lists in alphabetical order.

Team	Location	Stadium	Capacity
Abha	Abha	Al-Mahalah Stadium; Damac Club Stadium (Khamis Mushait)	20,000; 5,000
Al-Adalah	Al-Ahsa	Hofuf stadium Hajer Club Stadium	26,000; 12,000
Al-Anwar	Hotat Bani Tamim	Al-Anwar Club Stadium; Al-Shoulla Club Stadium (Al-Kharj)	8,000; 8,000
Al-Arabi	Unaizah	Department of Education Stadium	10,000
Al-Batin	Hafar al-Batin	Al-Batin Club Stadium	6,000
Al-Bukiryah	Al-Bukiryah	Al-Bukiryah Club Stadium	5,000
Al-Diriyah	Diriyah	Prince Turki bin Abdulaziz Stadium (Riyadh)	15,000
Al-Faisaly	Harmah	Al-Majma'ah Sports City Stadium (Al-Majma'ah)	7,000
Al-Jabalain	Hail	Prince Abdulaziz bin Musa'ed Sports City Stadium	12,250
Al-Jandal	Dumat al-Jandal	Al-Jawf University Stadium (Sakakah)	8,500
Al-Jubail	Jubail	Prince Nayef Sports City Stadium (Qatif); Prince Saud bin Jalawi Sports City Stadium (Khobar)	12,000; 15,000
Al-Orobah	Sakakah	Al-Jawf University Stadium; Al-Orobah Club Stadium	8,500; 7,000
Al-Raed	Buraidah	Al-Raed Club Stadium; King Abdullah Sports City Stadium Buraidah	5,000; 25,000
Al-Tai	Hail	Prince Abdulaziz bin Musa'ed Sports City Stadium	12,000
Al-Ula	al-Ula	Prince Mohammed Bin Abdulaziz Sports City (Medina)	24,000
Al-Wehda	Mecca	King Abdulaziz Sports City Stadium	38,000
Al-Zulfi	Al-Zulfi	Al-Zulfi Club Stadium	3,080
Jeddah	Jeddah	Al-Faisal Stadium; Sports Hall at King Abdullah Sports City	27,000; 1,000

=== Personnel and kits ===
Team	Manager	Captain	Kit manufacturer	Shirt sponsor
Abha	(Croatia) Damir Burić	(Saudi Arabia) Zakaria Sami	Offside	Yelo
Al-Adalah	(France) Didier Gomes Da Rosa	(Saudi Arabia) Abdullah Al-Yousef	Al-Adalah	Yelo
Al-Anwar	(Bahrain) Mohammed Adnan Ayoub	(Saudi Arabia) Faisal Al-Mujalli	Terio	Yelo
Al-Arabi	(Tunisia) Ghazi Ghrairi	(Saudi Arabia) Wesam Wahib	RightAway Sport	Naqi Water, Yelo
Al-Batin	(Portugal) Paulo Alves	(Saudi Arabia) Mazyad Freeh	Hattrick	Yelo, Almaali Hospital^{2}
Al-Bukiryah	(Uruguay) Leonardo Ramos	(Netherlands) Hicham Faik	RightAway Sport	Yelo, Rassin
Al-Diriyah	(Netherlands) Alfred Schreuder	(Saudi Arabia) Waleed Abdullah	Macron	Yelo, Rassin
Al-Faisaly	(Italy) Giovanni Solinas	(Saudi Arabia) Yassin Barnawi	Adidas	Aldrees, Yelo
Al-Jabalain	(Portugal) Ricardo Chéu	(Saudi Arabia) Abdullah Al-Harbi	Offside	Abar, Yelo
Al-Jandal	(Tunisia) Abderrazek Chebbi	(Saudi Arabia) Hammad Al-Shartan	Skillano	Yelo
Al-Jubail	(Saudi Arabia) Khalid Al-Nuaimi	(Saudi Arabia) Salman Al-Moasher	RightAway Sport	Yelo
Al-Orobah	(North Macedonia) Slavche Vojneski	(Saudi Arabia) Rafea Al-Ruwaili	Offside	Yelo
Al-Raed	(Portugal) Jorge Mendonça	(Cameroon) Oumar Gonzalez	Challenge	Yelo
Al-Tai	(Saudi Arabia) Amin Zubair (caretaker)	(Saudi Arabia) Ibrahim Al-Nakhli	Duneus	Abar, Yelo
Al-Ula	(Portugal) José Peseiro	(Saudi Arabia) Mohammed Al-Owais	Kappa	
Al-Wehda	(Bosnia and Herzegovina) Rusmir Cviko	(Saudi Arabia) Waleed Bakshween	Offside	Yelo
Al-Zulfi	(Tunisia) Habib Ben Romdhane	(Saudi Arabia) Salman Al-Saeed	Skillano	Yelo
Jeddah	(Brazil) Robertinho	(Somalia) Faisal Othman	Skillano	Yelo

- ^{1} On the back of the strip.
- ^{2} On the right sleeve of the strip.
- ^{3} On the shorts.

=== Managerial changes ===
Team	Outgoing manager	Manner of departure	Date of vacancy	Position in table	Incoming manager	Date of appointment
Abha	(Tunisia) Abderrazek Chebbi	End of contract	1 June 2025	Pre-season	(Croatia) Damir Burić	1 August 2025
Al-Adalah	(Slovakia) Martin Ševela	End of contract	1 June 2025	Pre-season	(Tunisia) Mohamed Ayari	3 August 2025
Al-Batin	(Saudi Arabia) Khalil Al-Masri	End of contract	1 June 2025	Pre-season	(France) Grégory Dufrennes	3 August 2025
Al-Diriyah	(Portugal) Fabiano Flora	End of contract	1 June 2025	Pre-season	(France) Sabri Lamouchi	20 July 2025
Al-Faisaly	(Spain) Pablo Franco	End of contract	1 June 2025	Pre-season	(Italy) Giovanni Solinas	27 July 2025
Al-Jabalain	(Portugal) Jorge Mendonça	End of contract	1 June 2025	Pre-season	(Portugal) Ricardo Chéu	11 August 2025
Al-Jandal	(Saudi Arabia) Ziyad Al-Afar	End of contract	1 June 2025	Pre-season	(Serbia) Zoran Milinković	5 August 2025
Al-Jubail	(Saudi Arabia) Khalid Al-Nuaimi	End of contract	1 June 2025	Pre-season	(Portugal) Pedro Rodrigues	10 August 2025
Al-Orobah	(Spain) Antonio Cazorla	End of contract	1 June 2025	Pre-season	(North Macedonia) Slavche Vojneski	1 August 2025
Al-Raed	(Croatia) Krešimir Režić	End of contract	1 June 2025	Pre-season	(Portugal) Jorge Mendonça	4 September 2025
Al-Tai	(Croatia) Zdravko Logarušić	End of contract	1 June 2025	Pre-season	(Spain) Carlos Inarejos	14 July 2025
Al-Wehda	(Uruguay) José Daniel Carreño	End of contract	1 June 2025	Pre-season	(Chile) José Luis Sierra	1 September 2025
Jeddah	(Spain) Iván Carrasco	End of contract	1 June 2025	Pre-season	(Brazil) Robertinho	13 August 2025
Al-Anwar	(Saudi Arabia) Sultan Khamis	Resigned	25 July 2025	Pre-season	(Portugal) David Patrício	25 July 2025
Al-Tai	(Spain) Carlos Inarejos	Resigned	6 October 2025	15th	(Saudi Arabia) Khalil Al-Masri	8 October 2025
Al-Adalah	(Tunisia) Mohamed Ayari	Sacked	29 October 2025	15th	(Saudi Arabia) Abdulhadi Al-Abdullah (caretaker)	29 October 2025
Al-Wehda	(Chile) José Luis Sierra	Mutual consent	6 November 2025	17th	(Egypt) Mahmoud Abbas (caretaker)	6 November 2025
Al-Adalah	(Saudi Arabia) Abdulhadi Al-Abdullah (caretaker)	End of caretaker period	18 November 2025	15th	(France) Didier Gomes Da Rosa	18 November 2025
Al-Anwar	(Portugal) David Patrício	Sacked	24 November 2025	14th	(Saudi Arabia) Abdullah Mohammed Al-Dawsari (caretaker)	24 November 2025
Al-Batin	(France) Grégory Dufrennes	Mutual consent	27 November 2025	17th	(Saudi Arabia) Abdulaziz Nasser (caretaker)	27 November 2025
Al-Batin	(Saudi Arabia) Abdulaziz Nasser (caretaker)	End of caretaker period	1 December 2025	17th	(Portugal) Paulo Alves	1 December 2025
Al-Zulfi	(Saudi Arabia) Khalid Al-Koroni	Mutual consent	2 December 2025	13th	(Tunisia) Habib Ben Romdhane	6 December 2025
Al-Jubail	(Portugal) Pedro Rodrigues	Sacked	4 December 2025	18th	(Saudi Arabia) Khalid Al-Nuaimi	4 December 2025
Al-Arabi	(Spain) Kiko López	Sacked	5 December 2025	14th	(Tunisia) Ghazi Ghrairi	11 December 2025
Al-Diriyah	(France) Sabri Lamouchi	Sacked	6 December 2025	4th	(Netherlands) Alfred Schreuder	6 December 2025
Al-Anwar	(Saudi Arabia) Abdullah Mohammed Al-Dawsari (caretaker)	End of caretaker period	11 December 2025	12th	(Bahrain) Mohammed Adnan Ayoub	11 December 2025
Al-Wehda	(Egypt) Mahmoud Abbas (caretaker)	End of caretaker period	15 December 2025	15th	(Bosnia and Herzegovina) Rusmir Cviko	15 December 2025
Al-Jandal	(Serbia) Zoran Milinković	Mutual consent	29 December 2025	12th	(Tunisia) Abderrazek Chebbi	29 December 2025
Al-Ula	(Tunisia) Youssef Mannai	Sacked	3 January 2026	4th	(Portugal) José Peseiro	3 January 2026
Al-Tai	(Saudi Arabia) Khalil Al-Masri	Resigned	8 January 2026	11th	(Morocco) Amine Zoubir (caretaker)	8 January 2026
Al-Batin	(Portugal) Paulo Alves	Sacked	20 January 2026	18th	(Nigeria) Henry Makinwa (caretaker)	20 January 2026
Al-Raed	(Portugal) Jorge Mendonça	Sacked	5 February 2026	8th	(Palestine) Rami El Hassan (caretaker)	5 February 2026
Al-Raed	(Palestine) Rami El Hassan (caretaker)	End of caretaker period	18 February 2026	8th	(Tunisia) Nacif Beyaoui	18 February 2026
Al-Bukiryah	(Uruguay) Leonardo Ramos	Sacked	23 February 2026	8th	(Portugal) Fabiano Flora	23 February 2026
Al-Arabi	(Tunisia) Ghazi Ghrairi	Sacked	26 February 2026	16th	(France) Laurent Hagist	2 March 2026
Al-Adalah	(France) Didier Gomes Da Rosa	Sacked	18 March 2026	15th	(Tunisia) Mohamed Mkacher	25 March 2026
Al-Batin	(Nigeria) Henry Makinwa (caretaker)	End of caretaker period	26 April 2026	16th	(Kuwait) Maher Al-Shammari	26 April 2026

=== Foreign players ===
The number of foreign players is limited to 5 players per team, in addition to two slots for U21 players (born in 2004 or after).

- Players name in **bold** indicates the player is registered during the mid-season transfer window.
- Players in italics were out of the squad or left the club within the season, after the pre-season transfer window, or in the mid-season transfer window, and at least had one appearance.

Club	Player 1	Player 2	Player 3	Player 4	Player 5	U21 player1(s)	U21 player2(s)	U21 player3(s)	Former/unregistered players
Abha	(Brazil) Muralha	(Curaçao) Juriën Gaari	(Netherlands) Sylla Sow	(Portugal) Afonso Taira	(Spain) **Agi Dambelley**	(France) **Kamil Boumedmed**	(Nigeria) **Suleiman Bello**		(Tunisia) Ahmed Jafeli
Al-Adalah	(Algeria) **Achraf Boudrama**	(Ivory Coast) **Koffi Kouamé**	(Democratic Republic of the Congo) André Bukia	(South Africa) Ranga Chivaviro	(Zambia) **Joshua Mutale**				(Brazil) Lucas Cunha (Brazil) Lucas Turci (Uganda) Kenneth Semakula
Al-Anwar	(Algeria) **Rédha Bensayah**	(Brazil) Marlon	(Brazil) Raykar	(Brazil) Tiago Bezerra	(Cameroon) Appolinaire Kack	(Colombia) Ricardo Caraballo			
Al-Arabi	(Armenia) Solomon Udo	(Benin) **Gislain Ahoudo**	(Ethiopia) **Gatoch Panom**	(Ghana) **Kwadwo Frimpong**	(Senegal) Amadou Ciss	(Burkina Faso) **Abdul Karim Konate**	(The Gambia) **Bakary Touray**		(Brazil) Sheldon (Brazil) Vinícius Araújo (Ecuador) Néicer Acosta
Al-Batin	(Comoros) Youssouf M'Changama	(Democratic Republic of the Congo) Paul-José M'Poku	(France) Omar El Manssouri	(Guinea) Simon Falette	(Mali) Abdoulay Diaby	(Argentina) Isaías Rodríguez	(England) Samuel Sackey	(Morocco) Ayman Berouas	
Al-Bukiryah	(Argentina) Fernando Piñero	(Australia) Connor Pain	(Costa Rica) Jonathan Moya	(Guinea) Ousmane Barry	(Netherlands) Hicham Faik	(Jordan) Amin Abu Khalifa	(Nigeria) **Aremu Owolabi**		
Al-Diriyah	(Cameroon) Georges-Kévin Nkoudou	(France) Gaëtan Laborde	(The Gambia) Omar Colley	(Mali) Moussa Marega	(Spain) Óscar Rodríguez	(Senegal) Clayton Diandy			
Al-Faisaly	(Brazil) Eduardo Henrique	(Brazil) Morato	(Brazil) Raphael Silva	(Honduras) **Romell Quioto**	(Moldova) Henrique Luvannor	(Tunisia) **Mohamed Absi**			(Senegal) Ibrahima Ndiaye
Al-Jabalain	(Albania) Eraldo Cinari	(Angola) Megue	(France) Cheikh Touré	(Portugal) Diogo Queirós	(Portugal) João Novais				(Brazil) Mateus (Brazil) Tiago Guerra
Al-Jandal	(France) Thibault Peyre	(Mali) Samba Camara	(Morocco) Ayoub Lakhdar	(Nigeria) Anthony Okpotu	(Venezuela) **Aitor López**				(Ghana) Kwame Bonsu
Al-Jubail	(Brazil) Roberto Dias	(Morocco) Fayçal Fajr	(Morocco) Zakaria Lahlali	(Senegal) Ousseynou Thioune		(Tunisia) Wissem Chaouali			(Guinea-Bissau) Ença Fati
Al-Orobah	(Ivory Coast) Aboubacar Doumbia	(Netherlands) Anass Najah	(Nigeria) Simy	(Venezuela) Darwin González		(Tunisia) Ahmed Hlila	(Yemen) **Abdulaziz Masnoum**		
Al-Raed	(Algeria) Yousri Bouzok	(Cameroon) Oumar Gonzalez	(Colombia) Juanjo Narváez	(France) Karim Yoda	(Guinea-Bissau) Zinho Gano	(Brazil) Pedro Brito	(Egypt) Karim Ashraf	(Liberia) Solomon Tweh	
Al-Tai	(Bolivia) Luis Haquín	(Brazil) Jonata Machado	(Croatia) Dino Halilović	(Germany) Törles Knöll	(Morocco) Omar El Hanoudi				
Al-Ula	(Argentina) Cristian Guanca	(Brazil) Danilo Barbosa	(Brazil) **Michael**	(Greece) Efthymis Koulouris	(Serbia) Matija Nastasić	(Yemen) Salem Ayyash			(Mali) Adama Traoré
Al-Wehda	(Algeria) **Farouk Chafaï**	(Algeria) **Mehdi Boudjemaa**	(Iraq) Ali Adnan Kadhim	(Mali) Demba Diallo	(Norway) **Bjørn Maars Johnsen**	(Egypt) Hazem Ismail			(Nigeria) Augustine Oladapo (Senegal) Ablaye Mbengue (Spain) Agi Dambelley
Al-Zulfi	(Brazil) Diego Miranda	(Brazil) **Léo Tilica**	(Comoros) **Housseine Zakouani**	(Democratic Republic of the Congo) **Ben Malango**	(The Gambia) Hamza Barry	(The Gambia) **Anthony Gomez**	(The Gambia) **Sulayman Jawla**		(Algeria) Abdeljalil Medioub (Kenya) Eric Johana Omondi (Nigeria) Lanre Kehinde
Jeddah	(Brazil) Walmerson	(Burundi) Bonfils-Caleb Bimenyimana	(Georgia (country)) Giorgi Aburjania	(Namibia) Kennedy Amutenya	(Somalia) Faisal Othman	(Egypt) Moamed Rajeh			

== League table ==
Pos	Team	Pld	W	D	L	GF	GA	GD	Pts	Promotion, qualification or relegation
1	Abha (C, P)	34	24	5	5	64	35	+29	77	Promotion to the Pro League
2	Al-Faisaly (P)	34	21	10	3	76	32	+44	73	Promotion to the Pro League
3	Al-Diriyah (O, P)	34	22	6	6	79	39	+40	72	Qualification for the promotion play-offs
4	Al-Ula	34	21	8	5	72	33	+39	71	Qualification for the promotion play-offs
5	Al-Orobah	34	20	5	9	56	38	+18	65	Qualification for the promotion play-offs
6	Al-Jabalain	34	17	8	9	59	38	+21	59	Qualification for the promotion play-offs
7	Al-Raed	34	14	10	10	64	46	+18	52	
8	Al-Zulfi	34	11	12	11	46	45	+1	45	
9	Al-Tai	34	12	8	14	48	52	−4	44	
10	Al-Wehda	34	12	7	15	52	58	−6	43 (Note: Head-to-head points: Al-Wehda 3 (+2), Al-Bukiryah 3 (–2).)	
11	Al-Bukiryah	34	12	7	15	36	48	−12	43	
12	Al-Anwar	34	10	11	13	53	54	−1	41	
13	Jeddah	34	9	12	13	34	51	−17	39	
14	Al-Adalah	34	8	9	17	44	70	−26	33	
15	Al-Jandal	34	8	8	18	34	60	−26	32	
16	Al-Batin (R)	34	5	7	22	39	69	−30	22	Relegation to the Second Division
17	Al-Arabi (R)	34	5	6	23	24	67	−43	21	Relegation to the Second Division
18	Al-Jubail (R)	34	3	5	26	28	73	−45	14	Relegation to the Second Division

Source: saff.com.sa
Rules for classification: 1) Points; 2) Head-to-head points; 3) Head-to-head goal difference; 4) Total goal difference; 5) Total goals scored; 6) Fair-play points
(Note: Head-to-head record is used only after all the matches between the teams in question have been played).
(C) Champions; (O) Play-off winners; (P) Promoted; (R) Relegated

=== Positions by round ===
The table lists the positions of teams after each week of matches. In order to preserve chronological evolution, any postponed matches are not included in the round at which they were originally scheduled but added to the full round they were played immediately afterward.

Team ╲ Round	1	2	3	4	5	6	7	8	9	10	11	12	13	14	15	16	17	18	19	20	21	22	23	24	25	26	27	28	29	30	31	32	33	34
Abha	8	4	9	6	5	2	2	2	1	1	1	1	1	1	1	1	1	1	1	1	1	1	1	1	1	1	1	1	1	1	1	1	1	1
Al-Diriyah	13	5	2	2	4	6	4	3	4	4	4	3	2	2	3	2	2	2	2	2	2	3	2	2	2	2	2	2	2	2	2	2	3	
Al-Ula	1	1	1	1	1	1	1	1	2	2	3	2	4	4	5	5	5	4	4	3	3	2	3	4	3	3	3	3	3	4	4	4	4	
Al-Faisaly	9	11	11	12	10	11	9	9	9	8	8	8	7	6	7	8	7	8	7	7	6	6	6	6	5	4	4	4	4	3	3	3	2	
Al-Orobah	16	8	7	4	2	3	3	4	3	3	2	4	3	3	2	3	3	3	3	4	4	4	5	5	6	6	5	5	5	6	5	5	5	5
Al-Jabalain	3	9	5	3	3	5	8	8	6	7	5	6	6	7	6	6	6	5	5	5	5	5	4	3	4	5	6	6	6	5	6	6	6	6
Al-Raed	6	6	3	5	7	7	5	5	7	6	6	7	8	8	8	9	9	9	8	8	8	8	7	7	7	7	7	7	7	7	7	7	7	7
Al-Zulfi	14	7	6	8	11	12	13	12	12	13	12	14	15	16	16	14	14	14	14	10	12	10	12	10	9	9	9	8	8	8	8	8	8	
Al-Bukiryah	5	10	12	14	12	8	7	6	5	5	7	5	5	5	4	4	4	6	6	6	7	7	8	8	8	8	8	10	9	9	9	10	11	
Al-Tai	12	14	15	15	13	14	10	11	10	10	10	10	11	11	11	10	10	10	11	11	11	9	11	9	11	10	10	9	10	12	10	9	9	
Al-Wehda	18	18	18	18	18	18	17	16	15	16	15	13	10	10	10	11	12	13	10	13	13	13	9	11	10	11	12	13	11	10	11	11	10	
Al-Anwar	11	13	14	10	14	13	14	14	14	12	13	15	14	15	13	13	13	12	13	12	10	12	13	13	13	12	13	11	12	11	12	12	12	12
Jeddah	2	2	8	9	6	4	6	7	8	9	9	9	9	9	9	7	8	7	9	9	9	11	10	12	12	13	11	12	13	13	13	13	13	13
Al-Jandal	4	3	4	7	9	10	11	13	11	11	11	11	12	12	12	12	11	11	12	14	14	14	14	14	14	14	14	14	14	14	14	14	15	15
Al-Batin	15	16	17	16	16	16	16	17	17	17	17	17	17	17	18	18	18	18	18	17	17	17	17	17	17	17	17	17	15	16	16	17	16	16
Al-Adalah	7	15	10	13	15	15	15	15	16	15	16	16	16	13	14	15	15	15	15	15	16	15	15	15	15	15	15	15	16	15	15	15	14	14
Al-Arabi	10	12	13	11	8	9	12	10	13	14	14	12	13	14	15	16	16	16	16	16	15	16	16	16	16	16	16	16	17	17	17	16	17	17
Al-Jubail	17	17	16	17	17	17	18	18	18	18	18	18	18	18	17	17	17	17	17	18	18	18	18	18	18	18	18	18	18	18	18	18	18	18

Promotion to the Pro League
Qualification for the promotion play-offs
Relegation to the Second Division

Updated to match(es) played on 14 May 2026. Source:

== Results ==
Home \ Away	ABH	ADA	ANW	ARB	BAT	BUK	DIR	FSY	JAB	JAN	JUB	ORO	RAE	TAI	ULA	WHD	ZUL	JED
Abha		0–1	1–1	3–0	3–1	0–0	2–1	2–2	3–1	4–1	2–0	2–3	2–1	3–1	2–0	2–1	2–0	1–0
Al-Adalah	1–2		2–1	0–1	1–1	1–3	1–1	1–6	2–1	2–1	2–0	1–4	4–4	1–3	1–1	1–4	1–1	2–2
Al-Anwar	0–2	4–1		3–0	2–2	1–2	4–2	1–3	2–3	0–1	4–3	2–2	1–0	0–2	1–2	5–1	2–0	2–1
Al-Arabi	1–3	2–1	1–1		1–0	1–1	1–3	0–3	0–2	2–3	4–3	0–1	1–0	0–3	0–1	0–1	1–4	0–1
Al-Batin	0–1	1–1	2–3	3–1		0–0	1–2	1–2	1–2	1–2	3–1	1–3	1–1	4–1	0–1	2–1	1–2	1–4
Al-Bukiryah	1–2	1–0	2–1	1–0	5–1		0–1	0–2	0–4	1–1	1–0	1–0	0–1	1–2	1–3	2–1	1–3	1–1
Al-Diriyah	2–0	3–1	2–0	5–1	4–1	3–2		1–1	3–0	3–0	5–2	3–1	1–3	2–0	1–3	5–0	2–1	1–0
Al-Faisaly	3–0	1–0	4–1	0–0	4–0	1–2	2–2		2–0	4–2	2–1	0–0	5–3	3–0	2–1	2–2	2–3	0–0
Al-Jabalain	1–3	1–2	1–1	4–0	4–1	2–1	3–0	2–1		4–2	4–0	1–2	2–1	0–1	2–2	2–0	1–1	4–1
Al-Jandal	1–1	0–3	1–1	1–0	2–1	0–1	0–4	0–0	1–1		1–0	1–2	0–2	1–1	1–2	1–2	2–1	1–2
Al-Jubail	0–3	2–2	0–0	2–0	1–0	2–1	1–2	0–1	0–0	1–3		2–3	0–2	1–4	0–2	0–2	2–2	1–3
Al-Orobah	1–2	2–2	3–1	1–0	2–1	3–0	3–3	0–1	0–1	1–0	2–1		0–0	2–1	0–1	2–0	0–1	0–3
Al-Raed	5–1	6–3	1–1	4–0	2–1	1–1	2–3	1–2	3–1	4–1	1–0	0–1		1–1	3–2	2–1	1–2	0–0
Al-Tai	1–2	0–1	1–1	3–1	5–1	2–0	0–0	0–4	0–0	2–1	4–0	1–3	2–2		1–5	1–2	1–1	1–2
Al-Ula	1–2	4–1	1–1	2–1	1–1	3–0	2–1	2–2	0–0	5–1	3–0	3–1	2–1	3–0		0–3	4–2	1–1
Al-Wehda	2–3	4–1	3–1	2–2	2–2	3–0	0–2	2–2	0–1	1–1	2–1	1–2	2–2	3–1	0–5		1–1	2–1
Al-Zulfi	0–2	2–0	2–2	1–1	1–0	1–2	1–1	2–3	1–1	1–0	2–0	1–2	2–2	1–2	0–0	1–0		1–2
Jeddah	1–1	1–0	0–2	1–1	1–2	1–1	0–5	0–4	1–3	0–0	1–1	0–4	0–2	0–0	0–4	2–1	1–1	

Updated to match(es) played on 14 May 2026. Source: saff.com.sa
Legend: Blue = home team win; Yellow = draw; Red = away team win.

== Promotion play-offs ==
Semi-finals
3	Al-Diriyah	3
6	Al-Jabalain	0
4	Al-Ula (a.e.t.)	2
5	Al-Orobah	1

Final
3	Al-Diriyah	2
4	Al-Ula	1

=== Semi-finals ===
18 May 2026
19:05

Al-Diriyah	3–0	Al-Jabalain
Diandy 17', 70'; Al-Dossari 86'

Prince Turki bin Abdulaziz Stadium, Riyadh
18 May 2026
21:00

Al-Ula	2–1 (a.e.t.)	Al-Orobah
Barbosa 90+5'; Adam 105+5'		Simy 90+1'

Prince Mohamed bin Abdulaziz Sports City, Medina

=== Final ===
23 May 2026
19:10

Al-Diriyah	2–1 (a.e.t.)	Al-Ula
Al-Hussain 65' (o.g.); Laborde 94'		Guanca 29'

Prince Turki bin Abdulaziz Stadium, Riyadh

== Statistics ==
As of 14 May 2026

=== Scoring ===
==== Top scorers ====
Rank	Player	Club	Goals
1	(Netherlands) Sylla Sow	Abha	27
1	(Nigeria) Simy	Al-Orobah	27
3	(France) Gaëtan Laborde	Al-Diriyah	26
4	(Guinea-Bissau) Zinho Gano	Al-Raed	24
5	(Greece) Efthymis Koulouris	Al-Ula	22
6	(Moldova) Henrique Luvannor	Al-Faisaly	21
7	(Mali) Moussa Marega	Al-Diriyah	19
7	(France) Cheikh Touré	Al-Jabalain	19
9	(Germany) Törles Knöll	Al-Tai	17
10	(Argentina) Cristian Guanca	Al-Ula	14
10	(Portugal) João Novais	Al-Jabalain	14

==== Hat-tricks ====
Player	For	Against	Result	Date	Ref.
(Guinea-Bissau) Zinho Gano	Al-Raed	Al-Adalah	4–4 (A)	12 September 2025	
(France) Gaëtan Laborde	Al-Diriyah	Al-Adalah	3–1 (H)	17 September 2025	
(Nigeria) Simy	Al-Orobah	Al-Adalah	4–1 (A)	20 October 2025	
(Nigeria) Simy	Al-Orobah	Al-Diriyah	3–3 (H)	28 October 2025	
(Greece) Efthymis Koulouris	Al-Ula	Al-Jandal	5–1 (H)	21 December 2025	
(Brazil) Tiago Bezerra	Al-Anwar	Al-Adalah	4–1 (H)	5 January 2026	
(Costa Rica) Jonathan Moya	Al-Bukiryah	Al-Batin	5–1 (H)	6 January 2026	
(Guinea-Bissau) Zinho Gano	Al-Raed	Al-Adalah	6–3 (H)	22 January 2026	
(Nigeria) Simy	Al-Orobah	Al-Tai	3–1 (A)	28 January 2026	
(France) Gaëtan Laborde	Al-Diriyah	Jeddah	5–0 (A)	25 February 2026	
(Democratic Republic of the Congo) Ben Malango	Al-Zulfi	Al-Arabi	4–1 (A)	7 April 2026	
(Guinea-Bissau) Zinho Gano	Al-Raed	Abha	5-1 (H)	13 May 2026	

=== Clean sheets ===
Rank	Player	Club	Clean sheets
1	(Saudi Arabia) Mohammed Al-Hassawi	Al-Faisaly	13
2	(Saudi Arabia) Mohammed Al-Owais	Al-Ula	12
3	(Saudi Arabia) Abdullah Al-Jadaani	Abha	11
3	(Saudi Arabia) Mohammed Al-Waked	Al-Jabalain	
5	(Saudi Arabia) Waleed Abdullah	Al-Diriyah	8
5	(Saudi Arabia) Jassem Al-Ashban	Al-Orobah	8
7	(Saudi Arabia) Saad Al-Saleh	Al-Zulfi	7
8	(Saudi Arabia) Abdulrahman Dagriri	Al-Tai	6
9	(Saudi Arabia) Bader Al-Enezi	Al-Bukiryah	5
9	(Saudi Arabia) Yasser Al-Mosailem	Jeddah	5
9	(Saudi Arabia) Saleh Al-Ohaymid	Al-Raed	5

== Number of teams by province ==
Rank	Province	Number	Teams
1	Riyadh	4	Al-Anwar, Al-Diriyah, Al-Faisaly, and Al-Zulfi
2	Al-Qassim	3	Al-Arabi, Al-Bukiryah, and Al-Raed
2	Eastern Province	3	Al-Adalah, Al-Batin, and Al-Jubail
4	Al-Jawf	2	Al-Jandal and Al-Orobah
4	Ha'il	2	Al-Jabalain and Al-Tai
4	Mecca	2	Al-Wehda and Jeddah
7	Asir	1	Abha
7	Medina	1	Al-Ula

== See also ==
- 2025–26 Saudi Pro League
- 2025–26 Saudi Second Division League
- 2025–26 Saudi Third Division
