= Rafael Martins =

Rafael Martins may refer to:

- Rafael Martins (footballer, born 1989), Brazilian football striker
- Rafael Martins (footballer, born 1991), Brazilian football goalkeeper
- Rafael Martins (racing driver) (born 1999), Brazilian racecar driver

== See also ==
- Rafael Martín (1914-2010), Spanish basketball player
- Rafael Martin (born 1984), American baseball player
