= Mbaye Diagne (footballer) =

Senegalese footballer (born 1991)

Personal information
- Full name: Mbaye Diagne
- Date of birth: 28 October 1991 (age 35)
- Place of birth: Dakar, Senegal
- Height: 1.91 m (6 ft 3 in)
- Position: Striker

Team information
- Current team: Amedspor
- Number: 45

Senior career*
| Years | Team | Apps | (Gls) |
| 2012–2013 | Bra | 29 | (23) |
| 2013–2015 | Juventus | 0 | (0) |
| 2013 | → Ajaccio (loan) | 0 | (0) |
| 2014 | → Lierse (loan) | 7 | (4) |
| 2014 | → Al-Shabab (loan) | 2 | (0) |
| 2015 | → Westerlo (loan) | 5 | (2) |
| 2015–2016 | → Újpest (loan) | 14 | (11) |
| 2016–2017 | Tianjin TEDA | 44 | (16) |
| 2018–2019 | Kasımpaşa | 34 | (32) |
| 2019–2022 | Galatasaray | 44 | (21) |
| 2019–2020 | → Club Brugge (loan) | 6 | (4) |
| 2021 | → West Bromwich Albion (loan) | 16 | (3) |
| 2022–2023 | Fatih Karagümrük | 33 | (23) |
| 2023–2024 | Al-Qadsiah | 32 | (26) |
| 2024–2025 | Neom | 22 | (14) |
| 2025– | Amed | 46 | (31) |

International career^{‡}
| 2018–2021 | Senegal | 11 | (0) |
Medal record
Africa Cup of Nations
| Runner-up | 2019 Egypt |
- * Club domestic league appearances and goals as of 17 November 2026 ‡ National team caps and goals as of 30 March 2021

Mbaye Diagne (born 28 October 1991) is a Senegalese professional footballer who plays as a striker for Süper Lig club Amedspor.

== Club career ==
=== Early career ===
Born in Dakar, Senegal, Diagne spent his early career in Italy, beginning in 2013, Diagne joined AC Bra, where he went on to score 23 goals in 29 Serie D matches.

=== Juventus ===
Diagne was signed by manager Antonio Conte for Serie A champions Juventus in July 2013. On 13 September 2013, he was signed on loan by French club Ajaccio to gain further first team experience. Ajaccio were then managed by Italian manager Fabrizio Ravanelli (who was also a former teammate of Conte's). However, the loan didn't go as planned and Diagne failed to make a single first team appearance.

==== Lierse loan ====
Diagne was loaned out to Belgian club Lierse in January 2014, and made his debut on 31 January against Anderlecht, scoring in the 25th minute. He scored a hat-trick against Mons on 8 February in his next game for the club, ending with 2 goals in 1 games for the club.

==== Al Shabab loan ====
On 2 August 2014, Saudi club Al Shabab, announced the signing of Diagne on loan until June 2015. Diagne made his debut against Al Nassr FC on 7 August 2014 at Saudi Super Cup as substitute and played the last 17 minutes of the second half and 30 minutes of extra-time. He missed a penalty but eventually his team won the match.

==== Westerlo loan ====
On 5 January 2015, he joined KVC Westerlo on loan in the Belgium Pro League. He scored 1 goals in 2 games for the club.

==== Újpest loan ====
He joined Hungarian side Újpest FC on loan, he scored 2 goals in his first 3 games for the club, scoring in every single one of the games. On 24 October 2015, he created a much-publicized controversy, when 39-year-old club legend Péter Kabát wanted to take a penalty which he earned, but Diagne tucked the ball under his shirt and eventually converted the kick himself. In fact neither Kabát nor Diagne but Balázs Balogh was the designated penalty taker.

=== Tianjin TEDA ===
After impressing on loan at Újpest, on 6 February 2016, Diagne transferred to Chinese Super League side Tianjin TEDA from Juventus on a permanent transfer, signing a two-year deal. He scored 9 goals in 17 league matches during his time at the club.

=== Kasımpaşa ===
On 17 January 2018, Diagne joined Turkish Süper Lig side Kasımpaşa from Tianjin TEDA. He made his debut for the club two days later, coming on as a substitute in the 85th minute, and scoring the winning goal in a 3–2 victory over Alanyaspor. On 12 May 2018, Diagne scored his first hat-trick for the club in a 3–1 win over Gençlerbirliği. During his first season in Istanbul, he played 17 games and scored 12 goals.

On 23 September 2018, with a goal in a 1–2 defeat to Alanyaspor, Diagne set the record of scoring 8 goals in his first 6 matches in the Süper Lig since the start of the season. He scored a brace in a 2–2 draw with Fenerbahçe. On 22 December, Diagne scored another two goals in a 4–1 win over Beşiktaş, but was suspended for one league game due to receiving his fourth yellow card. In the next fixture he received a red card in Turkish Cup against Alanyaspor due to spitting on his opponent and he was banned for an additional 4 matches, attracting interest from clubs like Leeds United.

=== Galatasaray ===
On 31 January 2019, Galatasaray announced the signing of Diagne for a transfer fee of €10 million, signing a contract until 31 August 2022. He made his debut for the club on 10 February 2019, in a match against Trabzonspor, scoring the opening goal from a penalty in a 3–1 win.

Diagne netted his first hattrick for the club in a 3–0 win against Yeni Malatyaspor. He later scored braces against Kayserispor and Çaykur Rizespor, thus keeping him in first place among top scorers in Süper Lig that season. On 15 May, he scored a late goal in a 3–1 win against Akhisarspor in the Turkish Cup final, marking his first trophy with Galata. Diagne eventually finished the season as top scorer of the league, with a total of 30 goals, as Galatasaray won the domestic treble.

==== Club Brugge (loan) ====
On 2 September 2019, Diagne joined Belgian First Division A side Club Brugge on loan.

He missed a penalty for the club in a Champions League match against PSG after ignoring instructions from manager Philippe Clement and was subsequently fined and suspended as a result.

==== West Bromwich Albion (loan) ====
On 29 January 2021, Diagne joined West Bromwich Albion on loan until the end of the season. In April 2021, Diagne scored his second Premier League goal in a 5–2 win against Chelsea.

==== Return to Galatasaray ====
On 18 July 2022, Galatasaray announced that Diagne's contract was mutually terminated.

=== Fatih Karagümrük ===
On 18 July 2022, it was announced that he signed contract with Fatih Karagümrük until 31 August 2022.

=== Al-Qadsiah ===
On 13 July 2023, Diagne joined Saudi First Division League club Al-Qadsiah. He finished as the league's top scorer, helping Al-Qadsiah win the First Division title and earn promotion to the Pro League.

=== Neom ===
On 16 July 2024, Diagne joined newly promoted Saudi First Division side Neom.

=== Amed SK ===
On 9 August 2025, Diagne returned to Turkey and signed a two-year contract with TFF 1. Lig side Amedspor.

== International career ==
In March 2018, Diagne revealed that he left Chinese side Tianjin TEDA for Kasımpaşa to further his chances of playing for Senegal national team and further his chances of impressing to gain a place in the 2018 FIFA World Cup squad. On 17 May 2018, Diagne missed out on the World Cup squad after being overlooked by manager Aliou Cissé.

On 9 September 2018, Diagne made his debut for Senegal in a 2–2 draw against Madagascar in a 2019 Africa Cup of Nations qualifier, coming on in the last minute as a substitute for Moussa Konaté.

== Career statistics ==
=== Club ===
As of match played 2 May 2026

Appearances and goals by club, season and competition
| Club | Season | League | | | National cup (Note: Includes Magyar Kupa, Turkish Cup, Belgian Cup, King's Cup) | | Continental | | Other | | Total | |
| Club | Season | Division | Apps | Goals | Apps | Goals | Apps | Goals | Apps | Goals | Apps | Goals |
|---|---|---|---|---|---|---|---|---|---|---|---|---|
| Bra | 2012–13 | Serie D | 29 | 23 | – | | – | | – | | 29 | 23 |
| Juventus | 2013–14 | Serie A | 0 | 0 | – | | – | | – | | 0 | 0 |
| Juventus | 2014–15 | Serie A | 0 | 0 | – | | – | | – | | 0 | 0 |
| Juventus | Total | | 0 | 0 | — | | — | | — | | 0 | 0 |
| Ajaccio (loan) | 2013–14 | Ligue 1 | 0 | 0 | – | | – | | – | | 0 | 0 |
| Lierse (loan) | 2013–14 | Belgian Pro League | 7 | 4 | – | | – | | 4 | 3 | 11 | 7 |
| Al-Shabab (loan) | 2014–15 | Saudi Pro League | 2 | 0 | – | | – | | 1 (Note: Appearance in Saudi Super Cup) | 0 | 3 | 0 |
| Westerlo (loan) | 2014–15 | Belgian Pro League | 5 | 2 | – | | – | | 6 (Note: Appearances in Belgian Pro League Europa League play-offs) | 1 | 11 | 3 |
| Újpest (loan) | 2015–16 | Nemzeti Bajnokság I | 14 | 11 | 1 | 0 | – | | – | | 15 | 11 |
| Tianjin TEDA | 2016 | Chinese Super League | 27 | 10 | – | | – | | – | | 27 | 10 |
| Tianjin TEDA | 2017 | Chinese Super League | 17 | 6 | – | | – | | – | | 17 | 6 |
| Tianjin TEDA | Total | | 44 | 16 | — | | — | | — | | 44 | 16 |
| Kasımpaşa | 2017–18 | Süper Lig | 17 | 12 | – | | – | | – | | 17 | 12 |
| Kasımpaşa | 2018–19 | Süper Lig | 17 | 20 | 2 | 0 | – | | – | | 19 | 20 |
| Kasımpaşa | Total | | 34 | 32 | 2 | 0 | — | | — | | 36 | 32 |
| Galatasaray | 2018–19 | Süper Lig | 12 | 10 | 3 | 1 | 2 (Note: Appearances in UEFA Europa League) | 0 | – | | 17 | 11 |
| Galatasaray | 2019–20 | Süper Lig | 3 | 0 | 0 | 0 | 0 | 0 | – | | 3 | 0 |
| Galatasaray | 2020–21 | Süper Lig | 15 | 9 | 1 | 0 | 3 | 2 | – | | 19 | 11 |
| Galatasaray | 2021–22 | Süper Lig | 14 | 2 | 0 | 0 | 8 (Note: One appearance and one goal in UEFA Champions League, seven appearances and one goal in UEFA Europa League) | 2 | – | | 22 | 4 |
| Galatasaray | Total | | 44 | 21 | 4 | 1 | 13 | 4 | – | | 61 | 26 |
| Club Brugge (loan) | 2019–20 | Belgian Pro League | 6 | 4 | 1 | 0 | 2 (Note: Appearances in UEFA Champions League) | 0 | – | | 9 | 4 |
| West Bromwich Albion (loan) | 2020–21 | Premier League | 16 | 3 | 0 | 0 | — | | — | | 16 | 3 |
| Fatih Karagumruk | 2022–23 | Süper Lig | 33 | 23 | 2 | 2 | — | | — | | 35 | 25 |
| Al-Qadsiah | 2023–24 | Saudi First Division League | 32 | 26 | 1 | 0 | — | | — | | 33 | 26 |
| Neom | 2024–25 | Saudi First Division League | 22 | 14 | 0 | 0 | — | | — | | 22 | 14 |
| Amed | 2025–26 | TFF 1. Lig | 37 | 29 | 2 | 0 | — | | — | | 39 | 29 |
| Career total | | | 306 | 187 | 10 | 3 | 15 | 4 | 11 | 4 | 343 | 198 |

=== International ===
As of 30 March 2021

Appearances and goals by national team and year
| National team | Year | Apps | Goals |
|---|---|---|---|
| Senegal | 2018 | 3 | 0 |
| Senegal | 2019 | 7 | 0 |
| Senegal | 2020 | 0 | 0 |
| Senegal | 2021 | 1 | 0 |
| Total | | 11 | 0 |

== Honours ==
Al-Shabab

- Saudi Super Cup: 2014

Galatasaray

- Süper Lig: 2018–19
- Turkish Cup: 2018–19
- Turkish Super Cup: 2019

Club Brugge

- Belgian First Division A: 2019–20

Al-Qadsiah

- Saudi First Division League: 2023–24

Neom

- Saudi First Division League: 2024–25

Senegal

- Africa Cup of Nations runner-up: 2019

Individual

- Gol Kralı: 2018–19
- Süper Lig Team of the Season: 2021–22
- Saudi First Division League top scorer: 2023–24
