= Lucas Souza (footballer, born 1990) =

Brazilian footballer

Personal information
- Full name: Lucas Vieira de Souza
- Date of birth: 4 July 1990 (age 36)
- Place of birth: Santo André, Brazil
- Height: 1.86 m (6 ft 1 in)
- Position: Midfielder

Senior career*
Years	Team	Apps	(Gls)
2012	Paraná	10	(0)
2013–2014	Olhanense	29	(3)
2014–2015	Parma	3	(0)
2015	→ Moreirense (loan)	6	(0)
2015–2016	Tondela	26	(2)
2016–2017	AEL Limassol	18	(5)
2017–2020	APOEL	69	(12)
2020–2021	Changchun Yatai	15	(3)
2021	→ Beijing Guoan (loan)	7	(0)
2021–2022	APOEL	18	(4)
2022–2023	Al-Khaleej	29	(2)
2023–2025	Al-Faisaly	60	(22)
- * Club domestic league appearances and goals as of 1 June 2023

Lucas Vieira de Souza (born 4 July 1990) is a former Brazilian professional footballer who played as a midfielder.

== Club career ==
Born in Santo André, São Paulo, Souza started playing professionally with Paraná Clube. In 2013 he moved to Portugal, being relegated from the Primeira Liga with S.C. Olhanense in his first full season.

Souza joined Parma F.C. in late August 2014, for a reported fee of €700,000. He made his Serie A debut on 5 October, playing the full 90 minutes in a 1–2 home loss against Genoa CFC.

Souza returned to Portugal in late January 2015, being loaned to Moreirense F.C. until the end of the campaign. In the summer, after having cut all ties with the Italian club, he signed a one-year contract with C.D. Tondela also in the Portuguese top division.

On 6 July 2017, Souza joined Cyprus' APOEL FC after one year with AEL Limassol in the same country.

On 5 March 2020, Souza join China League One club Changchun Yatai. On 8 November 2020, Yatai won the division after beating Chengdu Better City 3-0 on the final matchday in his first season and was promoted back to Chinese Super League.

On 10 April 2011, Souza joined fellow Chinese Super League club Beijing Guoan on loan. He returned to Yatai on 29 July 2021 after his loan contract expired.

On 29 July 2022, Souza joined Saudi Arabian club Al-Khaleej on a free transfer.

On 26 July 2023, Souza joined Al-Faisaly.

== Career statistics ==
As of match played on 28 July 2021

Appearances and goals by club, season and competition
Club	Season	League			National Cup		League Cup		Continental		Other		Total	
Club	Season	Division	Apps	Goals	Apps	Goals	Apps	Goals	Apps	Goals	Apps	Goals	Apps	Goals
Paraná	2012	Série B	10	0	1	0	—		—		—		11	0
Olhanense	2012–13	Primeira Liga	11	2	0	0	0	0	—		—		11	2
Olhanense	2013–14	Primeira Liga	18	1	1	1	2	0	—		—		21	2
Olhanense	Total		29	3	1	1	2	0	—		—		32	4
Parma	2014–15	Serie A	3	0	1	0	—		—		—		4	0
Moreirense (loan)	2014–15	Primeira Liga	6	0	0	0	0	0	—		—		6	0
Tondela	2015–16	Primeira Liga	26	2	0	0	1	0	—		—		27	2
AEL Limassol	2016–17	Cypriot First Division	18	5	0	0	—		—		—		18	5
APOEL	2017–18	Cypriot First Division	27	3	4	0	—		0	0	—		31	3
APOEL	2018–19	Cypriot First Division	25	5	5	0	—		8	3	1 (Note: Appearances in Cypriot Super Cup)	0	39	8
APOEL	2019–20	Cypriot First Division	17	4	2	0	—		10	1	0	0	29	5
APOEL	Total		69	12	11	0	—		18	4	1	0	99	16
Changchun Yatai	2020	China League One	15	3	0	0	—		—		—		15	3
Beijing Guoan (loan)	2021	Chinese Super League	7	0	0	0	—		—		—		7	0
APOEL	2021–22	Cypriot First Division	28	5	5	0	—		—		—		33	5
APOEL	2022–23	Cypriot First Division	—		—		—		1	0	—		1	0
APOEL	Total		28	5	5	0	—		1	0	—		34	5
Al Khaleej	2022–23	Saudi Professional League	29	2	1	0	—		—		—		30	2
Al Faisaly	2023–24	Saudi First Division	31	14	3	2	—		—		—		33	16
Career total			271	46	20	1	3	0	19	4	1	0	259	37

== Honours ==
=== Club ===
Changchun Yatai

- China League One: 2020
