= Sadat Karim =

Ghanaian footballer

Personal information
- Date of birth: October 24, 1991 (age 35)
- Place of birth: Kumasi, Ghana
- Height: 1.80 m (5 ft 11 in)
- Position: Forward

Team information
- Current team: Galatina

Youth career
- 1998–2007: Kumasi Barcelona

Senior career*
Years	Team	Apps	(Gls)
2007–2008	King Faisal Babes FC	8	(2)
2008–2010	Real Tamale United	57	(31)
2010–2011	Berekum Chelsea	7	(0)
2011–2012	Ashanti Gold SC	18	(7)
2012–2013	Accra Hearts of Oak	25	(6)
2013	BW 90 IF	5	(3)
2014	Inter Allies FC	8	(5)
2014	→ Landskrona BoIS (loan)	11	(1)
2015–2016	KSF Prespa Birlik	51	(38)
2017–2018	Landskrona BoIS	58	(32)
2019–2023	Halmstads BK	119	(23)
2023	Apollon Smyrnis	16	(2)
2023–2024	Al-Qaisumah	33	(14)
2024–2025	Al-Zulfi	25	(3)
2025–	Galatina		

International career
2009–2010	Ghana U20	5	(2)
- * Club domestic league appearances and goals as of 16 June 2023

Sadat Karim (born 24 October 1991) is a Ghanaian professional footballer who plays as a forward for Italian Eccellenza club Galatina.

He started his career at local club Kumasi Barcelona Babies F.C in Kumasi, Ghana.

Sadat Karim was born on 24 October 1991 in Kumasi in the Ashanti Region of Ghana, the third of the five children of his parents. He has an elder sister and an elder brother while also having two younger sisters. Sadat is a Muslim. He started his formal education at Asawasi Presbyterian International School where he wrote his BECE Exams with an excellent grade of 6As. Then he went to Prempeh College for high school education while playing for King Faisal Babes FC in the Ghana Premier League.

On 14 August 2023, Karim joined Saudi club Al-Qaisumah. On 18 July 2024, Karim joined Al-Zulfi. On 13 September 2025, Karim joined Italian Eccellenza club Galatina.
