= Roel Coumans =

Dutch football manager

Personal information
- Date of birth: 23 August 1970 (age 56)
- Place of birth: Meerssen, Netherlands

Managerial career
- Years: Team
- 2008–2013: Fortuna Sittard (assistant)
- 2013–2014: HSV (assistant)
- 2015–2017: Saudi Arabia (assistant)
- 2018: Australia (assistant)
- 2020–2021: United Arab Emirates (assistant)
- 2021–2022: Al-Hazem
- 2022–2023: Abha
- 2023–2024: Al-Adalah

Roel Coumans (born 23 August 1970) is a Dutch football manager.

== Career ==
Coumans started his managerial career as assistant manager of Dutch second-tier side Fortuna Sittard. In 2013, he was appointed assistant manager of HSV in the German Bundesliga. In August 2015, Coumans was appointed assistant manager of Saudi Arabia. In 2018, he was appointed assistant manager of the Australia.

In 2020, he was appointed assistant manager of the United Arab Emirates. In 2022, Coumans was appointed manager of Saudi Arabian club Al-Hazem.

On 30 October 2022, Coumans was appointed as Abha's manager.

On 18 December 2023, Coumans was appointed as manager of Saudi First Division club Al-Adalah.

== Managerial statistics ==
As of match played 31 May 2023

Managerial record by team and tenure
| Team | Nat | From | To | Record | | | | | | | |
| Team | Nat | From | To | G | W | D | L | GF | GA | GD | Win % |
|---|---|---|---|---|---|---|---|---|---|---|---|
| Al-Hazem | (Saudi Arabia) | 1 March 2022 | 28 June 2022 | 8 | 1 | 0 | 7 | 8 | 21 | −13 | 12.50 |
| Abha | (Saudi Arabia) | 30 October 2022 | 1 June 2023 | 24 | 8 | 2 | 14 | 29 | 43 | −14 | 33.33 |
| Al-Adalah | (Saudi Arabia) | 21 December 2023 | 31 May 2024 | 20 | 7 | 10 | 3 | 25 | 21 | +4 | 35.00 |
| Career total | | | | 52 | 16 | 12 | 24 | 62 | 85 | −23 | 30.77 |
