= Appolinaire Kack =

Senegalese footballer

Personal information
- Full name: Appolinaire Gabriel Kack
- Date of birth: 21 March 1996 (age 30)
- Height: 1.80 m (5 ft 11 in)
- Position: Midfielder

Team information
- Current team: Al-Anwar
- Number: 8

Senior career*
Years	Team	Apps	(Gls)
- Cosmos de Bafia
–2019	AS Fortuna		
2019–2020	CA Bizertin	13	(0)
2020–2021	Al Ahli Tripoli		
2021–2023	Al Orooba		
2023–2024	Sitra		
2024–2025	Al Orooba		
2025	Al-Jubail		
2025–	Al-Anwar		
- * Club domestic league appearances and goals

Appolinaire Gabriel Kack (born 21 March 1996) is a Cameroonian professional footballer who plays as a midfielder for Al-Anwar Club.

== Career ==
In his homecountry, Kack had spells with Cosmos de Bafia and AS Fortuna. At AS Fortuna he was described as a good reader of the game. Kack moved abroad and was recruited by CA Bizertin in 2019. He played 13 games in the Tunisian Ligue Professionnelle 1. In 2020, Tunisian media reported kack signing for Club Africain, but he instead had spells in Libya with Al Ahli Tripoli from 2020 to 2021, followed by the UAE. Kack played two years for Al Orooba, then had one year in Bahrain with Sitra Club before returning to Al-Orooba in In February 2025 he moved to Saudi Arabia for the first time, joining Al-Jubail, followed by Al-Anwar in the summer.
