= Daouda Toure =

Malian footballer

Personal information
- Date of birth: 30 April 2000 (age 26)
- Place of birth: Bamako, Mali
- Height: 1.88 m (6 ft 2 in)
- Position: Midfielder

Team information
- Current team: East Riffa

Youth career
- –2019: Etoiles Mandé
- 2019: Pyunik

Senior career*
Years	Team	Apps	(Gls)
2019–2021	Al Dhafra	5	(0)
2020	→ Al Urooba (loan)	0	(0)
2022	AS Real Bamako		
2022–2023	Emirates Club		
2024	Al-Safa	16	(1)
2025–	East Riffa		
- * Club domestic league appearances and goals as of 17:17, 26 October 2019 (UTC)

Daouda Toure (born 30 April 2000) is a Malian footballer who plays as a midfielder for Bahraini club East Riffa.

== Career statistics ==
=== Club ===
As of 26 October 2019.

Club	Season	League			Cup		Continental		Other		Total	
Club	Season	Division	Apps	Goals	Apps	Goals	Apps	Goals	Apps	Goals	Apps	Goals
Al Dhafra	2019–20	UAE Pro League	5	0	1 (Note: Appearances in the UAE League Cup)	0	0	0	0	0	3	0
Career total			5	0	1	0	0	0	0	0	6	0
