= Youssef Anbar =

Saudi footballer and manager (born 1962)

Personal information
- Date of birth: 28 November 1962 (age 63)
- Place of birth: Jeddah, Saudi Arabia
- Position: Defender

Senior career*
Years	Team	Apps	(Gls)
- Al Ahli

International career
1984	Saudi Arabia	1	(0)

Managerial career
- 2019: Saudi Arabia (caretaker)
- * Club domestic league appearances and goals

Youssef Hussein Sultan Omar Anbar (Arabic: يُوسُف حُسَيْن سُلْطَان عُمَر عَنْبَر; born 28 November 1962) is a Saudi Arabian former football manager and footballer.

== Playing career ==
Anbar played for Saudi Arabian side Al Ahli and was regarded as one of the club's most important players through the 1980s.

== Style of play ==
Anbar played as a defender, mainly operating as a left-back.

== College career ==
Anbar obtained a master's degree in sports from the University of Lisbon in Portugal.
