= Fabiano Flora =

Portuguese football manager

Personal information
- Full name: Fabiano José Costa Flora
- Date of birth: 29 May 1985 (age 41)
- Place of birth: Penedono, Portugal

Team information
- Current team: Al-Bukiryah (manager)

Managerial career
- Years: Team
- 2009–2013: Lazio (youth)
- 2013: Juventus (youth)
- 2014: Olhanense
- 2014–2015: Académica (chief scout)
- 2016–2017: Zayar Shwe Myay
- 2017: Southern Myanmar
- 2019–2022: Timor-Leste
- 2022: Spartaks Jūrmala
- 2022: Al-Sahel
- 2023–2024: Al-Kholood
- 2024–2025: Al-Diriyah
- 2026–: Al-Bukiryah

Fabiano José Costa Flora (born 29 May 1985) is a Portuguese football coach, who manages Saudi club Al-Bukiryah.

== Career ==
Initially an assistant coach at Zayar Shwe Myay, he succeeded Stefan Hansson as manager and led the team to a sixth-place finish. The club then invited him to stay on as a manager.

In June 2016, his club briefly occupied second place in the 2016 Myanmar National League.

In early 2022, he managed Latvian club Spartaks Jūrmala. On 18 July 2022, Flora was appointed manager of Saudi Arabian club Al-Sahel.

On 1 September 2023, Flora was appointed as manager of Al-Kholood. He led the club to promotion to the Saudi Pro League for the first time in its history.

On 15 July 2024, Flora was appointed as manager of Al-Diriyah. He led the club to promotion to the First Division.

On 23 February 2026, Flora was appointed as manager of Al-Bukiryah.
