= Alan Cariús =

Brazilian footballer (born 1997)

Personal information
- Full name: Alan Lima Cariús
- Date of birth: 4 April 1997 (age 29)
- Place of birth: Paty do Alferes, Brazil
- Height: 1.75 m (5 ft 9 in)
- Position: Midfielder

Team information
- Current team: Seoul E-Land
- Number: 10

Youth career
- 2008-2011: Vasco da Gama
- 2012-2014: Volta Redonda

Senior career*
| Years | Team | Apps | (Gls) |
| 2015–2019 | Volta Redonda | 9 | (0) |
| 2015–2016 | → Flamengo U20 (loan) | | |
| 2017–2018 | → LASK Linz (loan) | 5 | (0) |
| 2017–2018 | → Juniors OÖ (loan) | 17 | (11) |
| 2018–2019 | → Blau-Weiß Linz (loan) | 27 | (9) |
| 2019 | → Vila Nova (loan) | 2 | (0) |
| 2020 | St. Pölten | 13 | (2) |
| 2020–2021 | Kasımpaşa | 15 | (1) |
| 2021 | Tuzlaspor | 14 | (2) |
| 2021–2022 | Al-Adalah | 30 | (8) |
| 2022–2023 | Kyoto Sanga | 1 | (0) |
| 2023–2024 | Al-Najma | 33 | (8) |
| 2024–2025 | Al-Adalah | 33 | (20) |
| 2025– | Seoul E-Land | 9 | (2) |
- * Club domestic league appearances and goals as of 5 August 2026

Alan Lima Cariús, known as Alan Cariús (born 4 April 1997) is a Brazilian professional footballer who plays as a midfielder for K League 2 club Seoul E-Land.

== Career ==
On 30 October 2019, he agreed to join Austrian club SKN St. Pölten in January 2020.

On 24 July 2021, he joined Saudi Arabian club Al-Adalah.

On 4 August 2022, Alan joined Japanese club Kyoto Sanga.

On 7 July 2023, Alan joined Al-Najma.

On 24 June 2024, Alan Cariús joined Al-Adalah.

On 12 June 2025, joined K League 2 club Seoul E-Land.
