= Aldrees Petroleum and Transport Services Company =

Multinational joint stock company in Riyadh, Saudi Arabia

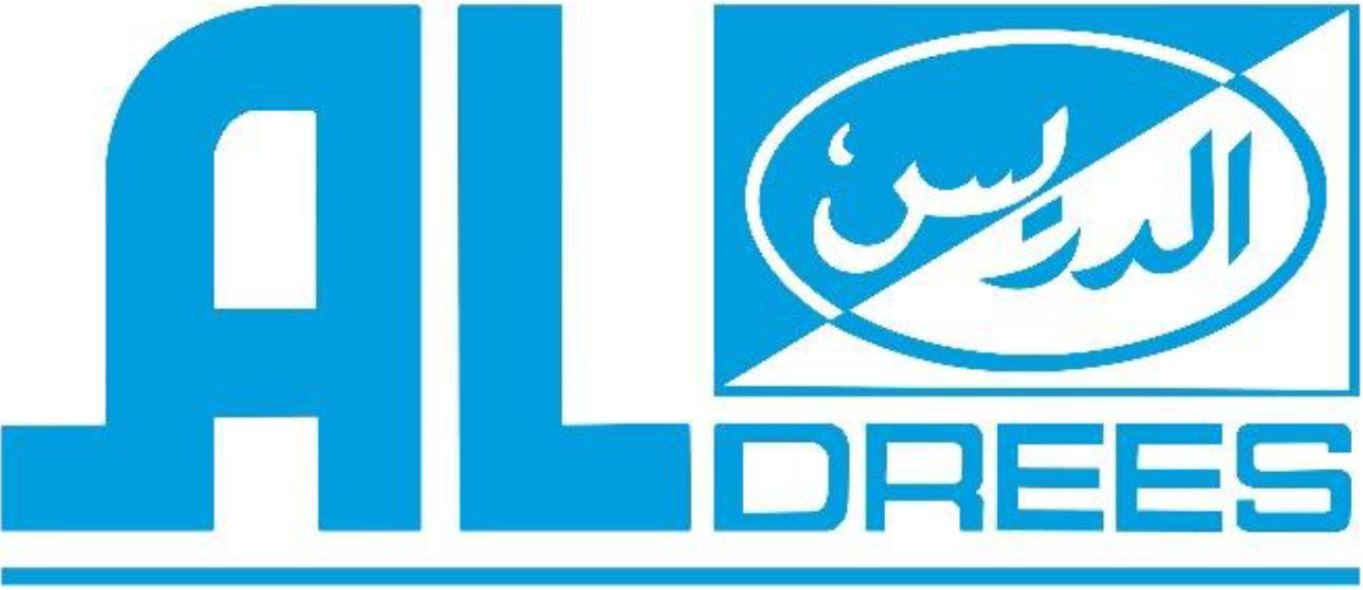
- Native name: شركة الدريس للخدمات البترولية والنقليات
- Formerly: Mohammed Saad Aldrees and Sons Company Limited (1962–2004)
- Type: Public
- Traded as: Tadawul: 4200
- ISIN: SA000A0HNGZ6
- Founded: September 12, 1962; 64 years ago
- Founder: Sheikh Mohammed Saad Aldrees
- Headquarters: Exit 28, Khurais Road, East Naseem District, Riyadh, Saudi Arabia
- Revenue: 547,492,000 Saudi riyal (2019)
- Total assets: 3,585,220,000 Saudi riyal (2019)
- Number of employees: 1805
- Website: aldrees.com

Aldrees Petroleum and Transport Services Company (APTSCO) (Arabic: شركة الدريس للخدمات البترولية والنقليات), formerly Yousef Saad Aldrees and Sons Company Limited (Arabic: شركة محمد سعد الدريس واولاده المحدودة), or simply Aldrees (Arabic: الدريس) is a multinational joint stock company based in Riyadh, Saudi Arabia that offers services in petroleum retailing and logistics. Established as a family partnership company in 1962, it was renamed to its current name following its split-up in December 2004. As of 2021, it owned around 600 gas stations across Saudi Arabia, holding a 5.3% stake in the country's 11,000 fuel stations.

== History ==
=== Early origins ===
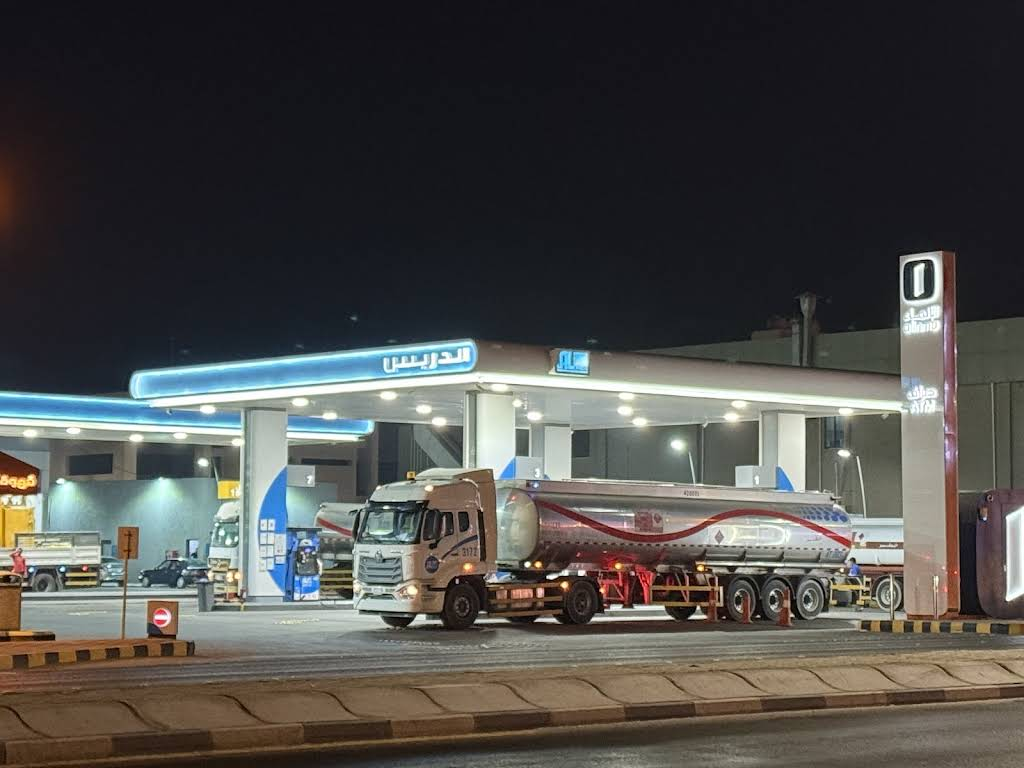
Aldrees fuel station in Qatif.

Sheikh Mohammed Saad Aldrees started his business career in 1938 (1356 Hijri) by trading live stocks such as goats, sheep and camels in the al-Artawiyah village of Saudi Arabia. He later began providing transportation facilities for parcels and government mails. He purchased his first truck in the 1940s and included it in his transportation business. In 1957, he opened his first gas station in Riyadh which consisted of four barrels and one hose for supplying gasoline.

=== Establishment ===
Sheikh Aldrees founded the Mohammed Saad Aldrees and Sons Company Limited with his four sons on September 12, 1962 as a family partnership company that offered services in petroleum retailing as well as in logistics. In 1963, it leased its first gas station in Riyadh at Rail Street. It owned another gas station by 1965 at Dhahran Street in al-Malazz neighborhood of Riyadh. It became a limited liability company in 2002.

=== 2004 renaming and split-up ===
On 14 December 2004, Mohammed Saad Aldrees and Sons Company Limited was renamed as Aldrees Petroleum and Transport Services Company after its non-petroleum and transport operations were carved out into a separate firm, Aldrees Industrial and Trading Company (ALITCO). Aldrees became a publicly listed joint stock company on Tadawul in accordance with the Ministry of Commerce and Industry's Ministerial Resolution No. 1707 dated 3/11/1426 Hijri (corresponding to 5/12/2005) and Ministerial Resolution No. 144 dated 27/01/1427 Hijri (corresponding to 26/02/2006).

In 2012, Aldrees signed an agreement with the Emirates National Oil Company to establish a new firm working in the field of owning, renting, building, operating and maintaining modern-designed gas stations on highways and within cities in Saudi Arabia. In 2021, Aldrees eyed expanding abroad when it began bidding to acquire 60 gas stations in Egypt.
