= Ença Fati =

Bissau-Guinean footballer

Personal information
- Full name: Ença Fati
- Date of birth: 11 August 1993 (age 33)
- Place of birth: Bissau, Guinea-Bissau
- Height: 1.80 m (5 ft 11 in)
- Position: Winger

Team information
- Current team: Mafra
- Number: 10

Senior career*
Years	Team	Apps	(Gls)
2011–2012	Herrera		
2012–2013	Salerm Puente Genil		
2013–2015	Real Massamá	44	(12)
2015–2018	Moreirense	27	(2)
2017	→ Leixões (loan)	23	(1)
2018	→ Oliveirense (loan)	13	(2)
2018–2019	Oliveirense	33	(12)
2019–2021	Feirense	30	(7)
2021	→ Casa Pia (loan)	8	(1)
2021–2022	Vilafranquense	29	(5)
2022–2023	Mafra	29	(7)
2023–2024	Al-Najma	13	(5)
2024–2025	Al-Ain	32	(4)
2025–2026	Al-Jubail	10	(1)
2026–	Mafra	8	(1)
- * Club domestic league appearances and goals as of 16:51, 24 August 2026 (UTC)

Ença Fati (born 11 August 1993) is a Bissau-Guinean professional footballer who plays as a winger for Liga 3 club Mafra.

== Club career ==
Born in Bissau, Guinea-Bissau, Fati moved to Portugal as a child, and started playing futsal. He made his association football debut in 2011, going on to spend two years in the Spanish regional divisions.

Fati returned to Portugal in the 2013 off-season, signing with amateurs Real SC. In February 2015 he moved straight to the Primeira Liga, joining Moreirense FC. He played his first game in the competition on 3 May, coming on as a 70th-minute substitute in a 3–1 away loss against Boavista FC. His first goal came on 1 November 2015, when he closed the 1–1 draw at Académica de Coimbra in injury time.

After two loans in the LigaPro, Fati left the Parque de Jogos Comendador Joaquim de Almeida Freitas in summer 2018. He continued his career in that tier, with U.D. Oliveirense, C.D. Feirense, Casa Pia AC, U.D. Vilafranquense and C.D. Mafra.

On 29 May 2023, Fati joined Saudi Arabian club Al-Najma SC. He remained in the First Division League in the following seasons, with Al-Ain FC and Al-Jubail Club.

== Personal life ==
Fati was cousin to another footballer, Ansu Fati. Developed at FC Barcelona, he represented Spain internationally.

== Honours ==
Moreirense

- Taça da Liga: 2016–17
