= Roberto Dias (footballer, born 1988) =

Brazilian footballer

Personal information
- Full name: Roberto Dias Correia Filho
- Date of birth: 8 August 1988 (age 38)
- Place of birth: São Paulo, Brazil
- Height: 1.88 m (6 ft 2 in)
- Position: Centre back

Team information
- Current team: Al-Jubail
- Number: 23

Youth career
- 2002–2005: Corinthians Sao Paolo

Senior career*
Years	Team	Apps	(Gls)
2006–2007	América Sao Paolo		
2007	Grêmio Barueri		
2008	Taboão da Serra		
2009	São Carlos		
2009–2010	Flamengo Rio de Janeiro	0	(0)
2011	Imbituba	0	(0)
2012	Uberaba	0	(0)
2013	Campinense	0	(0)
2013	Paços de Ferreira	0	(0)
2013	Astra Giurgiu	0	(0)
2013–15	CSA Maceió	0	(0)
2014	América (RN)	17	(0)
2015	Botafogo (PB)	1	(0)
2016	Nacional	0	(0)
2016	Ríver Atlético	7	(1)
2016–2017	Cafetaleros	14	(1)
2018	Novo Hamburgo	0	(0)
2018–2019	Senica	46	(7)
2020–2021	Ermis Aradippou	34	(0)
2021–2022	Orion Tip Sereď	27	(1)
2022–2024	Al-Kholood	67	(5)
2024–	Al-Jubail	0	(0)
- * Club domestic league appearances and goals as of 08:56, 19 August 2021 (UTC)

Roberto Dias Correia Filho (born 8 August 1988), commonly known as Roberto Dias, is a Brazilian footballer who plays for Saudi Arabian club Al-Jubail.

== Career ==
Roberto Dias made 17 appearances for América Futebol Clube (RN) in the 2014 Campeonato Brasileiro Série B, but wasn't able to prevent the club from being relegated to Série C.

On 9 June 2022, Dias joined Saudi Arabian club Al-Kholood. On 3 August 2024, Dias joined Al-Jubail.
