= Nacif Beyaoui =

Tunisian football manager

Personal information
- Full name: Nacif Beyaoui
- Date of birth: 10 November 1977 (age 48)
- Place of birth: Tunisia

Team information
- Current team: (manager)

Managerial career
- Years: Team
- 2008–2009: Stade Tunisien (assistant)
- 2009–2010: EGS Gafsa (assistant)
- 2010–2013: Al-Fateh (assistant)
- 2013–2014: Hajer
- 2014–2016: Al-Fateh
- 2016–2017: Al-Raed
- 2017: Al-Qadsiah
- 2017–2018: Al-Khor
- 2018: Al Kharaitiyat
- 2018: Al-Muharraq
- 2019: Al-Qadsiah
- 2019: CA Bizertin
- 2019–2020: Al-Adalah
- 2021: Stade Tunisien
- 2021: Fujairah
- 2021–2022: Al-Adalah
- 2022: JS Saoura
- 2022–2023: Al-Shoulla
- 2023: Al-Muharraq
- 2023–2024: JS Saoura
- 2024: Al-Jabalain
- 2024: Olympique Béja
- 2024–2025: Al-Batin
- 2025: Olympique Béja
- 2025–2026: Al-Nahda (Oman)
- 2026: Al-Raed

Nacif Beyaoui (Arabic: ناصيف بياوي; born 10 November 1977) is a Tunisian football manager. Besides managing in his native country Tunisia, Beyaoui has also managed clubs in Saudi Arabia, Qatar, Oman, and Bahrain.

On 20 March 2024, Beyaoui was appointed as manager of Saudi First Division side Al-Jabalain. On 16 October 2024, Beyaoui was appointed as manager of Al-Batin. On 18 February 2026, Beyaoui was appointed as manager of Al-Raed.
