= Fernando Piñero (footballer) =

Argentine footballer

Personal information
- Full name: Fernando Piñero
- Date of birth: 16 February 1993 (age 33)
- Place of birth: San José de la Esquina, Argentina
- Height: 1.95 m (6 ft 5 in)
- Position: Centre back

Team information
- Current team: Al-Bukiryah
- Number: 19

Youth career
- 2011–2014: Rosario Central

Senior career*
Years	Team	Apps	(Gls)
2014–2015	Rosario Central	1	(0)
2016–2017	Santamarina	64	(2)
2017–2018	Agropecuario	8	(0)
2018–2019	Central Córdoba	6	(0)
2019	Santamarina	12	(1)
2020–2021	Atlético Rafaela	35	(0)
2022–2023	Magallanes	56	(8)
2024–	Al-Bukiryah	75	(8)
- * Club domestic league appearances and goals as of 2 August 2026

Fernando Piñero (born 16 February 1993) is an Argentine professional footballer who plays as a defender for Saudi Arabian club Al-Bukiryah.

== Career ==
Rosario Central signed Piñero in 2011. He was moved into Miguel Ángel Russo's first-team squad during the 2014 Argentine Primera División campaign, appearing as an unused substitute in league fixtures with Quilmes and Vélez Sarsfield as well as in the Copa Sudamericana against Boca Juniors on 18 September. His professional debut came on 22 November as he played the full duration of a 1–1 draw with Olimpo. In January 2016, Piñero joined Santamarina of Primera B Nacional. He stayed for 2016 and 2016–17, making sixty-seven appearances and scoring two; notably his career first over Guillermo Brown in June 2016.

Piñero was signed by Agropecuario, a fellow Primera B Nacional team, on 4 August 2017. Eight appearances followed throughout the 2017–18 season. Central Córdoba became Piñero's fourth senior team in June 2018, with the defender making his bow on 1 October against Brown.

After spending two seasons with Chilean club Magallanes, he moved to Saudi Arabia in 2024 and joined Al-Bukiryah in the second level.

== Career statistics ==
As of 5 December 2018.

Club statistics
Club	Season	League			Cup (Note: Includes the Copa Argentina)		League Cup		Continental (Note: Includes the Copa Sudamericana)		Other		Total	
Club	Season	Division	Apps	Goals	Apps	Goals	Apps	Goals	Apps	Goals	Apps	Goals	Apps	Goals
Rosario Central	2014	Primera División	1	0	0	0	—		0	0	0	0	1	0
Rosario Central	2015	Primera División	0	0	0	0	—		—		0	0	0	0
Rosario Central	Total		1	0	0	0	—		0	0	0	0	1	0
Santamarina	2016	Primera B Nacional	21	1	0	0	—		—		0	0	21	1
Santamarina	2016–17	Primera B Nacional	43	1	3	0	—		—		0	0	46	1
Santamarina	Total		64	2	3	0	—		—		0	0	67	2
Agropecuario	2017–18	Primera B Nacional	8	0	0	0	—		—		0	0	8	0
Central Córdoba	2018–19	Primera B Nacional	2	0	1	0	—		—		0	0	3	0
Career total			75	2	4	0	—		0	0	0	0	79	2
