= Agi Dambelley =

Spanish footballer (born 1993)

Personal information
- Full name: Jae Dambelley Sidibeh
- Date of birth: 21 August 1993 (age 33)
- Place of birth: Spain
- Height: 1.84 m (6 ft 0 in)
- Positions: Winger; striker

Senior career*
Years	Team	Apps	(Gls)
–2015	CF Lloret		(7)
2015–2017	Palamós CF	72	(12)
2017–2018	CE L'Hospitalet	30	(3)
2018–2019	UB Conquense	20	(2)
2019–2020	Al-Jahra SC		
2020–2021	Kuwait SC		(3)
2021	Al-Fahaheel FC		(2)
2022	Kuwait SC		
2022–2023	Kazma SC		(5)
2023–2024	Al-Jandal	27	(12)
2024	Al-Najma	3	(1)
2024–2025	Al-Diriyah	30	(8)
2025–2026	Al-Wehda	12	(6)
2026	Abha	15	(6)
- * Club domestic league appearances and goals

Jae Dambelley Sidibeh (born 21 August 1993) is a Spanish footballer who plays as a winger or striker.

== Early life ==
As a youth player, Dambelley joined the youth academy of Spanish side Fundació Calella. He is of Gambian descent.

== Career ==
In 2015, Dambelley signed for Spanish side Palamós CF. He was regarded as one of the club's most important players. In 2018, he signed for Spanish side UB Conquense. On 1 September 2018, he scored his first two foals for the club during a 2–0 win over CE Sabadell. In 2022, he signed for Kuwaiti side Kuwait SC. He helped the club win the league. After that, he signed for Kuwaiti side Kazma SC. He was described as having an "exceptional season" while playing for the club.

On 28 July 2024, Dambelley joined Al-Najma. On 8 September 2024, Dambelley joined Al-Diriyah. In September 2025, Dambelley joined Al-Wehda. On 30 December 2025, Dambelley joined Abha.

== Style of play ==
Dambelley mainly operates as a winger or striker. He is known for his speed.

== Personal life ==
Dambelley was born in 1993 in Spain. He has played in the Spanish Kings League.
