= Anthony Okpotu =

Nigerian footballer

Personal information
- Date of birth: 3 March 1994 (age 32)
- Place of birth: Makurdi, Nigeria
- Height: 1.87 m (6 ft 2 in)
- Position: Forward

Team information
- Current team: Al-Quwa Al-Jawiya
- Number: 7

Senior career*
Years	Team	Apps	(Gls)
2012–2013	Lobi Stars		
2013–2014	Al-Ittihad Tripoli		
2015–2018	Lobi Stars		
2018–2019	Difaâ Hassani El Jadidi	1	(0)
2019	→ Laçi (loan)	10	(1)
2019–2020	US Monastir	25	(13)
2020–2022	Qatar	32	(7)
2022–2023	Al Masry	7	(0)
2023–2024	Al-Ain	27	(17)
2024–2025	Al-Adalah	24	(8)
2025–2026	Al-Jandal	31	(9)
2026–	Al-Quwa Al-Jawiya	8	(1)

International career^{‡}
2018	Nigeria	6	(2)
- * Club domestic league appearances and goals as of 00:38, 08 November 2026 (UTC) ‡ National team caps and goals as of 10 August 2018 (UTC)

Anthony Okpotu (born 3 March 1994) is a Nigerian professional footballer who plays as a forward for Al-Quwa Al-Jawiya and the Nigerian national team.

== Club career ==
Born in Makurdi, Okpotu spent his early club football with Lobi Stars and Al-Ittihad Tripoli. In April 2018 he had a trial at Danish club Brøndby. He joined Morocco side Difaâ Hassani El Jadidi in July 2018. On 31 January 2019, Okpotu was loaned out to Albanian club KF Laçi.

On 10 October 2020, he signed for Qatari club Qatar SC.

On 28 July 2023, Okpotu joined Saudi First Division side Al-Ain.

On 23 June 2024, Okpotu joined Al-Adalah.

On 23 August 2025, Okpotu joined Al-Jandal.

On 4 July 2026, Okpotu joined Al-Quwa Al-Jawiya.

== International career ==
Okpotu made his international debut for Nigeria in 2018.

== Honours ==
- Nigeria Professional Football League Top scorer: 2017 (19 goals)
- Tunisian Ligue Professionnelle 1 Top scorer: 2019 (14 goals)
