= Rafael Martins (footballer, born 1991) =

Brazilian footballer

Personal information
- Full name: Rafael Martins Claro dos Santos
- Date of birth: 29 November 1991 (age 34)
- Place of birth: Pariquera-Açu, Brazil
- Height: 1.90 m (6 ft 3 in)
- Position: Goalkeeper

Team information
- Current team: Marcílio Dias
- Number: 28

Youth career
- 2007–2011: Coritiba

Senior career*
Years	Team	Apps	(Gls)
2011–2020	Coritiba	8	(0)
2016	→ Sampaio Corrêa (loan)	0	(0)
2020–2021	Brasil de Pelotas	41	(0)
2021	→ Guarani (loan)	28	(0)
2022	Guarani	3	(0)
2022–2023	Al-Sahel	34	(0)
2023–2024	Al-Kholood	33	(0)
2024–2025	Al-Jubail	32	(0)
2025–	Marcílio Dias	0	(0)
- * Club domestic league appearances and goals as of 14 March 2021

Rafael Martins Claro dos Santos (born 29 November 1991), known as Rafael Martins, is a Brazilian professional footballer who plays as a goalkeeper for Brazilian club Marcílio Dias.

He spent two months on loan with Sampaio Corrêa in 2016, prior to his Coritiba debut, but was substitute goalkeeper in all 12 games.

On 16 August 2022, Martins joined Saudi Arabian club Al-Sahel. On 16 June 2023, Martins joined Al-Kholood. On 3 August 2024, Martins joined Al-Jubail.
