= Léo Tilica =

Brazilian footballer

Personal information
- Full name: Leonardo Costa Silva
- Date of birth: 20 April 1995 (age 31)
- Place of birth: São Luís, Brazil
- Height: 1.72 m (5 ft 8 in)
- Position: Winger

Youth career
- Grêmio

Senior career*
Years	Team	Apps	(Gls)
2011–2019	Grêmio	6	(0)
2018–2019	→ Atlético Tubarão (loan)	13	(3)
2019	→ Confiança (loan)	5	(0)
2019–2020	Caxias	12	(2)
2020–2023	Asteras Tripolis	78	(4)
2023–2025	Al-Najma	56	(13)
2025–2026	Dibba Al-Hisn	13	(2)
2026	Al-Zulfi	19	(5)
- * Club domestic league appearances and goals as of 13 May 2023

Leonardo Costa Silva (born 20 April 1995), commonly known as Léo Tilica, is a Brazilian professional footballer who plays as a winger.

On 17 July 2023, Tilica joined Al-Najma.

On 28 June 2025, Tilica joined UAE club Dibba Al-Hisn.
