= 2020–21 Saudi Second Division =

45th season of the Saudi Second Division

Saudi Second Division
- Season: 2020–21
- Dates: 30 October 2020 – 19 April 2021
- Champions: Al-Akhdoud (2nd title)
- Promoted: Al-Akhdoud; Al-Orobah; Al-Kholood; Bisha
- Relegated: Al-Hejaz; Al-Mujazzal; Al-Selmiyah; Kumait
- Matches: 366
- Goals: 947 (2.59 per match)
- Top goalscorer: Elhadji Malick; Mohammed Salem (22 goals each)
- Biggest home win: Al-Dahab 5–0 Al-Najma (12 February 2021); Al-Jandal 5–0 Al-Hejaz (26 February 2021)
- Biggest away win: Hetten 0–5 Al-Washm (11 December 2020)
- Highest scoring: Afif 3–5 Al-Washm (31 October 2020); Wej 6–2 Al-Selmiyah (14 January 2021)
- Longest winning run: Al-Washm (6 matches)
- Longest unbeaten run: Al-Sadd (14 matches)
- Longest winless run: Al-Arabi; Al-Hejaz (11 matches)
- Longest losing run: Al-Hejaz; Al-Mujazzal (6 matches)
- All statistics correct as of 19 April 2021.

The 2020–21 Saudi Second Division was the 45th season of the Saudi Second Division since its establishment in 1976. The season started on 30 October 2020 as a consequence of the postponement of the previous season's conclusion due to the COVID-19 pandemic. The group stage draw was held on 22 September 2020. The final was played on 19 April 2021 between Al-Akhdoud and Al-Orobah. Al-Akhdoud defeated Al-Orobah 4–2 on penalties (3–3 after extra time) to win their second title and first since 1992.

== Overview ==
=== Changes ===
As a result of the COVID-19 pandemic, all football competitions in Saudi Arabia were suspended until further notice on 14 March 2020. On 11 June 2020, the Saudi Football Federation announced that the Third Division would be abandoned at the quarter-finals stage and that the remaining 8 teams would be promoted to the Second Division. They also announced that the number of teams in the Second Division would be increased from 24 teams to 28 teams.

== Team changes ==
A total of 28 teams are contesting the league, including 16 sides from the 2019–20 season, 4 relegated teams from the MS League, and 8 promoted teams from the 2019–20 Third Division.

=== To Second Division ===
Promoted from the Third Division

- Al-Dahab
- Al-Lewa
- Al-Najma
- Al-Selmiyah
- Al-Taraji
- Al-Zulfi
- Bisha
- Kumait

Relegated from MS League

- Al-Mujazzal
- Al-Taqadom
- Al-Ansar
- Hetten

=== From Second Division ===
Promoted to MS League

- Hajer
- Al-Diriyah
- Arar
- Al-Sahel

Relegated to the Third Division

- Al-Anwar
- Al-Jubail
- Al-Suqoor
- Al-Dera'a

== Teams ==
;Group A

Locations of teams in the 2020–21 Saudi Second Division Group A

Club	Location	Stadium
Al-Akhdoud	Najran	Al Akhdoud Club Stadium
Al-Ansar	Medina	Al-Ansar Club Stadium
Al-Arabi	Unaizah	Al-Najma Club Stadium
Al-Entesar	Rabigh	Al-Entesar Club Stadium
Al-Hejaz	Baljurashi	King Saud Sport City Stadium (Al Bahah)
Al-Jandal	Dumat al-Jandal	Al-Oruba Club Stadium (Sakakah)
Al-Lewa	Baqaa	Al-Jabalain Club Stadium (Ha'il)
Al-Qaisumah	Hafar al-Batin	Al-Qaisumah Club Stadium
Al-Sadd	Najaan	Al-Shoulla Club Stadium (Al-Kharj)
Al-Safa	Safwa City	Al-Safa Club Stadium
Al-Taqadom	Al Mithnab	Al-Najma Club Stadium (Unaizah)
Al-Zulfi	Al Zulfi	Al-Zulfi Club Stadium
Bisha	Bisha	Bisha Club Stadium
Kumait	Marat	Kumait Club Stadium

Group B

Locations of teams in the 2018–19 Saudi Second Division Group B

Club	Location	Stadium
Afif	Afif	Al-Dera'a Club Stadium (Dawadmi)
Al-Dahab	Mahd adh Dhahab	Ohod Club Stadium (Medina)
Al-Kholood	Ar Rass	Al-Hazem Club Stadium
Al-Mujazzal	Al Majma'ah	Al Majma'ah Sports City
Al-Najma	Unaizah	Al-Najma Club Stadium
Al-Orobah	Sakakah	Al-Oruba Club Stadium
Al-Rawdhah	Al-Hasa (Al-Jeshah)	Prince Abdullah bin Jalawi Stadium
Al-Riyadh	Riyadh	Prince Turki bin Abdul Aziz Stadium
Al-Selmiyah	Al-Salamiyah	Al-Anwar Club Stadium (Hotat Bani Tamim)
Al-Sharq	Ad Dilam	Al-Shoulla Club Stadium (Al-Kharj)
Al-Taraji	Qatif	Al-Khaleej Club Stadium
Al-Washm	Shaqra	Al-Washm Club Stadium
Hetten	Samtah	King Faisal Sport City Stadium (Jizan)
Wej	Ta'if	King Fahd Stadium

=== Foreign players ===
The number of foreign players is limited to 2 per team.

Players name in bold indicates the player is registered during the mid-season transfer window.

Club	Player 1	Player 2	Former Players
Afif	(Romania) Petrișor Voinea	(Tunisia) Amara Ferjaoui	
Al-Akhdoud	(Brazil) Kaká Mendes	(Brazil) **Taylon Correa**	(Brazil) Alexandre Matão
Al-Ansar	(Brazil) **Patrick Carvalho**	(Tunisia) Mohamed Ben Ismail	(Ghana) Latif Amadu
Al-Arabi	(Mali) Ichaka Diarra	(Tunisia) **Slim Mezlini**	(Ghana) Torric Jebrin
Al-Dahab	(Tunisia) **Ayoub Jertila**	(Tunisia) **Khaldoun Mansour**	(Egypt) Mahmoud Khaled (Mali) Djémoussa Traoré
Al-Entesar	(Cameroon) **Patrick Ngoula**	(Ivory Coast) **Gnamien Gislain Yikpe**	(Tunisia) Khaldoun Mansour (Tunisia) Khalil Bouhalala
Al-Hejaz	(Brazil) **Autemar**	(Tunisia) Rabii Hamri	(Tunisia) Marouane Ben Amor
Al Jandal	(Ivory Coast) Guillaume Daho	(Tunisia) Sabri Zaidi	
Al-Kholood	(Mauritania) Mohamed Salem Dianos	(Tunisia) Abdallah Berrabeh	
Al-Lewaa	(Kuwait) **Talal Al-Ajami**	(Tunisia) Ahmad Boussaid	(Brazil) Manolo Godoy
Al-Mujazzal	(Brazil) **Léo Pimenta**	(Brazil) **Paulo Cézar**	(Brazil) Alandelon (Nigeria) Micheal Azekhumen
Al-Najma	(Tunisia) **Othman Saidi**	(Tunisia) Oussama Omrani	(Tunisia) Lamjed Ameur
Al-Orobah	(Brazil) Rayllan Bruno	(Tunisia) Mehdi Bensib	
Al-Qaisumah	(Mauritania) Fody Traoré	(Mauritania) **Moussa Samba**	(Angola) Aneel Fanset
Al-Rawdhah	(Ivory Coast) Koffi Boua	(Tunisia) **Nidhal Delhoumi**	(Brazil) Vandinho Soares
Al-Riyadh	(Senegal) Elhadji Malick	(Tunisia) Houssem Louati	
Al-Sadd	(The Gambia) Dawda Ceesay	(Senegal) Mignane Diouf	
Al-Safa	(Tunisia) Hamza Messaadi	(Tunisia) Slim Ben Belgacem	
Al-Selmiyah	(Senegal) Emmanuel Gomis	(Tunisia) **Lamjed Ameur**	(Tunisia) Oussama Hsini
Al-Sharq	(Angola) **Aneel Fanset**	(Tunisia) Nizar Touil	(Tunisia) Houssem Mekhinini
Al-Taqadom	(Mauritania) **Bekaye Wade**	(Niger) **Adamou Moussa**	(Bosnia and Herzegovina) Nedo Turković (Cameroon) Oumarou Kaina
Al-Taraji	(Guinea) Daouda Bangoura	(Guinea) Ismaël Bangoura	
Al-Washm	(Nigeria) **Harmony Ikande**	(Tunisia) **Alaeddine Abbès**	(Brazil) Stefano Pinho (Tunisia) Hassene Mouelhi
Al-Zulfi	(Mali) **Moussa Camara**	(Tunisia) **Chamseddine Samti**	(Nigeria) Hakeem Alabi (Tunisia) Slim Mezlini
Bisha	(Mauritania) **Ahmed Fall**	(Tunisia) Youssef Trabelsi	(Honduras) Franco Güity
Hetten	(Brazil) Douglas Lima	(Senegal) Valu Sar	
Kumait	(Mauritania) **Ely Cheikh Voulany**	(Tunisia) **Oussama Hsini**	(Egypt) Abdulrahman Khalil (Egypt) Ramadan Rabie
Wej	(Ivory Coast) **Koffi Adama**	(Tunisia) **Hassene Mouelhi**	(Mauritania) Ely Cheikh Voulany (Tunisia) Achraf Ben Dhiaf

== Group A ==
=== League table ===
Pos	Team	Pld	W	D	L	GF	GA	GD	Pts	Promotion, qualification or relegation
1	Al-Akhdoud (C, P)	26	15	8	3	42	22	+20	53	Promotion to the MS League and Qualification to the Final
2	Bisha (P)	26	13	10	3	40	19	+21	49	Promotion to MS League
3	Al-Jandal	26	14	6	6	35	22	+13	48	
4	Al-Qaisumah	26	12	9	5	37	24	+13	45	
5	Al-Safa	26	8	10	8	31	32	−1	34	
6	Al-Entesar	26	8	9	9	26	30	−4	33 (Note: Al-Entesar finished ahead of Al-Sadd on head-to-head points: Al-Entesar 0–0 Al-Sadd, Al-Sadd 0–1 Al-Entesar.)	
7	Al-Sadd	26	7	12	7	29	28	+1	33	
8	Al-Ansar	26	8	7	11	24	27	−3	31 (Note: Al-Ansar finished ahead of Al-Zulfi on overall goal difference: Al-Ansar −3, Al-Zulfi −6 (Al-Ansar 1–0 Al-Zulfi, Al-Zulfi 1–0 Al-Ansar).)	
9	Al-Zulfi	26	8	7	11	29	35	−6	31	
10	Al-Arabi	26	5	12	9	29	37	−8	27 (Note: Al-Arabi finished ahead of Al-Lewa on head-to-head points: Al-Arabi 0–0 Al-Lewa, Al-Lewa 1–3 Al-Arabi.)	
11	Al-Lewa	26	6	9	11	30	39	−9	27	
12	Al-Taqadom	26	4	13	9	27	34	−7	25 (Note: Al-Taqadom finished ahead of Al-Hejaz on overall goal difference: Al-Taqadom −7, Al-Hejaz −16 (Al-Taqadom 1–3 Al-Hejaz, Al-Hejaz 1–3 Al-Taqadom).)	
13	Al-Hejaz (R)	26	6	7	13	28	44	−16	25	Relegation to the Third Division
14	Kumait (R)	26	3	11	12	28	42	−14	20	Relegation to the Third Division

Source: Goalzz
Rules for classification: 1) Points; 2) Head-to-Head points; 3) Head-to-Head goal difference; 4) Head-to-Head goal scored; 5) Total goal difference; 6) Total goals scored; 7) Play-off (only for deciding champion, promotion and relegation).
(C) Champions; (P) Promoted; (R) Relegated

=== Results ===
Home \ Away	AKH	ANS	ARB	ENT	HEJ	JAN	LEW	QAI	SAD	SAF	TAQ	ZUL	BIS	KUM
Al-Akhdoud		2–0	4–1	0–0	2–2	2–0	1–0	2–2	2–2	3–1	1–1	1–0	1–0	0–0
Al-Ansar	1–1		1–0	2–0	1–2	1–2	0–2	0–0	2–1	0–1	1–0	1–0	1–1	2–0
Al-Arabi	0–2	0–2		2–2	0–0	2–0	0–0	2–2	1–1	0–2	1–1	0–1	3–3	2–2
Al-Entesar	0–2	3–1	1–1		0–0	0–1	2–1	1–0	0–0	3–2	0–1	2–1	1–1	2–2
Al-Hejaz	1–5	2–2	1–2	0–0		3–0	1–1	1–2	2–0	0–0	1–3	2–3	1–3	1–0
Al-Jandal	2–2	1–0	1–0	2–1	5–0		2–1	0–1	1–0	0–0	1–0	2–2	0–2	4–1
Al-Lewa	3–1	1–1	1–3	1–3	2–0	1–3		1–2	2–5	1–2	2–0	2–1	0–0	0–0
Al-Qaisumah	1–0	0–0	0–1	2–0	4–3	0–0	1–2		2–0	2–1	1–1	4–1	2–2	3–0
Al-Sadd	3–1	2–1	1–1	0–1	3–0	1–1	1–1	1–0		2–2	0–0	2–1	1–1	1–2
Al-Safa	0–1	0–3	3–2	3–1	1–0	0–4	4–0	1–2	0–0		0–0	1–2	2–1	1–1
Al-Taqadom	1–2	1–1	1–1	1–0	1–3	0–2	1–1	1–2	0–0	2–2		2–2	2–2	3–2
Al-Zulfi	0–1	1–0	4–2	1–1	0–1	0–1	2–1	1–1	0–0	1–1	1–0		1–3	2–1
Bisha	1–2	1–0	0–0	2–0	1–0	2–0	0–0	1–0	3–0	1–1	2–1	2–0		2–0
Kumait	0–1	3–0	1–2	1–2	3–1	0–0	3–3	1–1	1–2	0–0	3–3	1–1	0–3	

Updated to match(es) played on 9 April 2021. Source: saff.com.sa
Legend: Blue = home team win; Yellow = draw; Red = away team win.
For upcoming matches, an "a" indicates there is an article about the rivalry between the two participants.

== Group B ==
=== League table ===
Pos	Team	Pld	W	D	L	GF	GA	GD	Pts	Promotion, qualification or relegation
1	Al-Orobah (P)	26	16	6	4	51	28	+23	54	Promotion to the MS League and Qualification to the Final
2	Al-Kholood (P)	26	15	3	8	40	21	+19	48	Promotion to MS League
3	Al-Washm	26	12	9	5	47	28	+19	45	
4	Al-Riyadh	26	12	8	6	47	34	+13	44	
5	Al-Rawdhah	26	11	5	10	37	37	0	38	
6	Al-Najma	26	9	8	9	36	40	−4	35 (Note: Al-Najma finished ahead of Al-Taraji on head-to-head points: Al-Najma 1–1 Al-Taraji, Al-Taraji 0–1 Al-Najma.)	
7	Al-Taraji	26	9	8	9	31	35	−4	35	
8	Al-Sharq	26	9	7	10	31	30	+1	34 (Note: Al-Sharq finished ahead of Wej on head-to-head points: Al-Sharq 1–0 Wej, Wej 1–2 Al-Sharq.)	
9	Wej	26	10	4	12	36	40	−4	34	
10	Hetten	26	9	6	11	28	34	−6	33	
11	Afif	26	8	7	11	35	47	−12	31	
12	Al-Dahab	26	6	7	13	25	34	−9	25	
13	Al-Mujazzal (R)	26	7	3	16	33	46	−13	24	Relegation to the Third Division
14	Al-Selmiyah (R)	26	5	7	14	24	47	−23	22	Relegation to the Third Division

Source: Goalzz
Rules for classification: 1) Points; 2) Head-to-Head points; 3) Head-to-Head goal difference; 4) Head-to-Head goal scored; 5) Total goal difference; 6) Total goals scored; 7) Play-off (only for deciding champion, promotion and relegation).
(P) Promoted; (R) Relegated

=== Results ===
Home \ Away	AFI	DAH	KHO	MUJ	NAJ	ORO	RAW	RIY	SEL	SHR	TAR	WAS	HET	WEJ
Afif		2–4	0–2	1–3	2–2	1–0	1–0	1–2	2–1	4–3	1–1	3–5	1–1	0–1
Al-Dahab	1–0		1–3	1–0	5–0	0–2	3–1	1–2	0–2	0–2	0–1	0–1	0–0	1–2
Al-Kholood	4–2	3–0		2–2	1–0	2–1	2–0	2–0	2–0	2–0	2–0	0–1	1–0	1–0
Al-Mujazzal	0–1	2–2	0–3		1–2	1–3	2–3	2–4	4–0	2–0	1–3	0–0	3–1	1–0
Al-Najma	1–1	2–0	3–2	4–3		1–2	2–0	1–1	1–2	2–3	1–1	2–1	2–1	0–1
Al-Orobah	5–1	2–1	1–2	3–1	2–2		3–2	1–0	3–0	1–1	0–0	2–1	2–0	2–0
Al-Rawdhah	5–2	1–1	2–1	2–0	2–1	1–1		3–2	2–1	1–0	0–1	2–3	1–1	0–1
Al-Riyadh	3–3	2–0	0–0	4–0	1–0	2–3	2–3		1–1	1–0	4–2	1–1	1–0	1–1
Al-Selmiyah	0–1	1–1	1–0	1–0	1–1	1–3	1–1	1–3		0–2	0–0	0–2	0–2	3–2
Al-Sharq	0–0	0–1	1–1	0–1	2–2	2–0	1–0	2–1	2–2		3–0	2–2	1–3	1–0
Al-Taraji	1–1	1–0	1–0	1–0	0–1	1–3	2–2	3–4	3–1	1–0		2–2	2–1	0–2
Al-Washm	0–1	0–0	2–1	4–1	3–0	0–1	2–0	2–2	1–1	0–0	1–1		3–1	2–1
Hetten	0–2	0–0	1–0	1–0	1–1	2–2	0–1	1–3	2–1	2–1	2–1	0–5		4–0
Wej	2–1	2–2	2–1	0–3	1–2	3–3	1–2	0–0	6–2	1–2	3–2	4–3	0–1	

Updated to match(es) played on 9 April 2021. Source: saff.com.sa
Legend: Blue = home team win; Yellow = draw; Red = away team win.
For upcoming matches, an "a" indicates there is an article about the rivalry between the two participants.

== Third place play-off ==
Bisha, who finished 2nd in Group A will face Al-Kholood who finished 2nd in Group B to decide the third-placed team.

15 April 2021
22:00 AST

Bisha	1–4	Al-Kholood
Al-Bishi 3'	Report	Al-Ruwailli 18'; Kharmi 35'; Salem 45+1'; Al-Khaibari 79'

Bisha University Stadium, Bisha

== Final ==
The winners of each group will play a one-legged final to decide the champion of the 2020–21 Second Division. As winners of Group A, Al-Akhdoud will face Al-Orobah, the winners of Group B. Al-Akhdoud defeated Al-Orobah 4–2 on penalties to win their second title.

19 April 2021
22:00 AST

Al-Orobah	3–3 (a.e.t.)	Al-Akhdoud
Rayllan 35'; Al-Enezi 76'; M. Al-Shammari 78'	Report	Taylon 8', 19', 45+2'
Penalties
M. Al-Shammari (penalty missed); Rayllan (penalty scored); Bensib (penalty scored); Mansour (penalty missed)	2–4	(penalty scored) Mendes; (penalty scored) Al-Harthi; (penalty scored) Al-Shehri; (penalty scored) Al-Zubaidi

Al-Orobah Club Stadium, Sakakah

== Statistics ==
=== Top scorers ===
As of 19 April 2021

Rank	Player	Club	Goals
1	(Senegal) Elhadji Malick	Al-Riyadh	22
1	(Mauritania) Mohammed Salem	Al-Kholood	22
3	(Saudi Arabia) Mohammed Al-Shammeri	Al-Qaisumah	18
4	(Brazil) Rayllan Bruno	Al-Orobah	16
5	(Guinea) Ismaël Bangoura	Al-Taraji	15
5	(Tunisia) Slim Mezlini	Al-Zulfi / Al-Arabi	15
5	(Chad) Mohammed Alhaj	Al-Washm	15
8	(Tunisia) Hamza Messaadi	Al-Safa	13
9	(Saudi Arabia) Meqren Eid	Afif	12
10	(Tunisia) Ahmad Boussaid	Al-Lewa	11
10	(Ivory Coast) Koffi Boua	Al-Rawdhah	11
10	(Ivory Coast) Guillaume Daho	Al-Jandal	11
10	(Brazil) Taylon Correa	Al-Akhdoud	11

=== Hat-tricks ===
Player	For	Against	Result	Date	Ref.
(Senegal) Elhadji Malick Tall	Al-Riyadh	Al-Taraji	4–3 (A)	19 December 2020	
(Mauritania) Ely Cheikh Voulany	Wej	Al-Selmiyah	6–2 (H)	14 January 2021	
(Guinea) Ismaël Bangoura	Al-Taraji	Al-Mujazzal	3–1 (A)	26 January 2021	
(Saudi Arabia) Khaled Al-Najrani	Al-Safa	Al-Lewaa	4–0 (H)	26 February 2021	
(Tunisia) Sabri Zaidi	Al-Jandal	Al-Safa	4–0 (A)	4 March 2021	
(Ivory Coast) Gnamien Yikpe	Al-Entesar	Al-Ansar	3–1 (H)	4 March 2021	
(Ivory Coast) Guillaume Daho	Al-Jandal	Kumait	4–1 (H)	9 April 2021	
(Brazil) Taylon Correa	Al-Akhdoud	Al-Orobah	3–3 (A)	19 April 2021	

Note

(H) – Home; (A) – Away

== See also ==
- 2020–21 Professional League
- 2020–21 Prince Mohammad bin Salman League
