= 2021–22 Saudi Second Division League =

45th season of the Saudi Second Division

Second Division League
- Season: 2021–22
- Dates: 29 September 2021 – 20 April 2022
- Champions: Al-Arabi (2nd title)
- Promoted: Al-Arabi; Al-Qaisumah; Al-Riyadh
- Relegated: Al-Dahab; Afif; Al-Nojoom; Al-Thoqbah
- Matches: 367
- Goals: 939 (2.56 per match)
- Top goalscorer: Israel Abia; Youssef Trabelsi (20 goals each)
- Biggest home win: Al-Entesar 6–0 Al-Bukiryah (5 March 2022)
- Biggest away win: Al-Lewaa 0–4 Al-Saqer (29 October 2021); Al-Safa 0–4 Al-Jandal (14 January 2022); Al-Lewaa 0–4 Al-Arabi (11 February 2022); Al-Safa 0–4 Al-Taqadom (12 February 2022); Al-Sharq 0–4 Al-Dahab (5 March 2022); Al-Rayyan 0–4 Arar (11 March 2022)
- Highest scoring: Al-Jandal 4–4 Al-Zulfi (31 March 2022)
- Longest winning run: Al-Arabi (8 matches)
- Longest unbeaten run: Al-Riyadh (17 matches)
- Longest winless run: Al-Lewaa (16 matches)
- Longest losing run: Al-Thoqbah; Arar (7 matches)
- All statistics correct as of 20 April 2022.

The 2021–22 Saudi Second Division was the first season of the Saudi Second Division League after its rebrand, and the 46th season since its establishment in 1976. The season began on 29 September 2021 and concluded on 20 April 2022 with the final. The group stage draw was held on 8 June 2021.

The season was originally scheduled to conclude on 16 April with the final. However, it was announced that both the final and third-place play-off would be postponed due to an ongoing investigation into match-fixing allegations. The investigation was concluded on 12 April with no evidence of any match-fixing and the new date for the final was announced as 20 April.

The final was played on 20 April 2022 between Al-Arabi and Al-Qaisumah. Al-Arabi defeated Al-Qaisumah 1–0 to win their second title and first since 1986.

== Overview ==
=== Changes ===
On 9 October 2020, the Saudi FF announced that the number of teams in the league would be increased to 32, with each group consisting of 16 teams, starting from the 2022–23 season. To prepare for these changes it was announced that only 3 teams would be promoted to the MS League and 5 teams would be relegated from the MS League in the 2021–22 season.

=== Rebrand ===
On 29 September 2021, the newly appointed executive director of the SDL, Abdulmohsen Al-Duhaimi, announced a rebrand; beginning with the 2021–22 season, the competition would be known as the Second Division League (SDL). As part of the rebranding, a new logo was introduced.

== Team changes ==
A total of 28 teams are contesting the league, including 20 sides from the 2020–21 season, 4 relegated teams from the MS League, and 4 promoted teams from the 2020–21 Third Division.

=== To Second Division ===
Promoted from the Third Division

- Al-Saqer
- Al-Nairyah
- Al-Rayyan
- Tuwaiq

Relegated from MS League

- Al-Bukiryah
- Al-Thoqbah
- Arar
- Al-Nojoom

=== From Second Division ===
Promoted to MS League

- Al-Akhdoud
- Al-Orobah
- Al-Kholood
- Bisha

Relegated to the Third Division

- Al-Hejaz
- Al-Mujazzal
- Al-Selmiyah
- Kumait

== Teams ==
;Group A

Locations of teams in the 2021–22 Saudi Second Division Group A

Club	Location	Stadium
Al-Arabi	Unaizah	Al-Najma Club Stadium
Al-Bukiryah	Al Bukayriyah	Al-Bukiryah Club Stadium
Al-Dahab	Mahd adh Dhahab	Ohod Club Stadium (Medina)
Al-Entesar	Rabigh	Al-Entesar Club Stadium
Al-Lewaa	Baqaa	Al-Jabalain Club Stadium (Ha'il)
Al-Nojoom	Al-Hasa (Al-Shuqaiq)	Prince Abdullah bin Jalawi Stadium
Al-Rawdhah	Al-Hasa (Al-Jeshah)	Prince Abdullah bin Jalawi Stadium
Al-Riyadh	Riyadh	Prince Turki bin Abdul Aziz Stadium
Al-Sadd	Najaan	Al-Shoulla Club Stadium (Al-Kharj)
Al-Saqer	Buraidah (Al-Basr)	Al-Taawoun Club Stadium
Al-Sharq	Ad-Dilam	Al-Shoulla Club Stadium (Al-Kharj)
Al-Washm	Shaqra	Al-Washm Club Stadium
Tuwaiq	Al Zulfi	Al-Zulfi Club Stadium
Wej	Ta'if	King Fahd Stadium

Group B

Locations of teams in the 2021–22 Saudi Second Division Group B

Club	Location	Stadium
Afif	Afif	Al-Dera'a Club Stadium (Dawadmi)
Al-Ansar	Medina	Al-Ansar Club Stadium
Al-Jandal	Dumat al-Jandal	Al-Orobah Club Stadium (Sakakah)
Al-Nairyah	Al Nairyah	Al-Ettifaq Club Stadium
Al-Najma	Unaizah	Al-Najma Club Stadium
Al-Qaisumah	Hafar al-Batin	Al-Qaisumah Club Stadium
Al-Rayyan	Haʼil	Al-Jabalain Club Stadium
Al-Safa	Safwa City	Al-Safa Club Stadium
Al-Taqadom	Al Mithnab	Al-Najma Club Stadium (Unaizah)
Al-Taraji	Qatif	Al-Khaleej Club Stadium
Al-Thoqbah	Khobar	Prince Saud bin Jalawi Stadium
Al-Zulfi	Al Zulfi	Al-Zulfi Club Stadium
Arar	Arar	Prince Abdullah bin Abdulaziz bin Musa'ed Sport City Stadium
Hetten	Samtah	King Faisal Sport City Stadium (Jizan)

=== Foreign players ===
The number of foreign players was increased from 2 players per team to 3 players per team.

Players name in bold indicates the player is registered during the mid-season transfer window.

Club	Player 1	Player 2	Player 3	Former Players
Afif	(Mauritania) Mohamed Ajid	(Mauritania) Albashir Sidi	(Nigeria) Abdulhadi Adamw	
Al-Ansar	(Ghana) Emmanuel Banahene	(Guinea) Alseny Soumah	(Mauritania) Ablaye Sy	
Al-Arabi	(Brazil) José Anderson	(Mali) Cheibane Traoré	(Tunisia) Amir Omrani	
Al-Bukiryah	(Ivory Coast) Oussou Konan	(Tunisia) Chaker Rguiî	(Tunisia) Zied Ounalli	
Al-Dahab	(Mali) Amara Bagayoko	(Tunisia) Halim Darragi	(Tunisia) Kouni Khalfa	
Al-Entesar	(Cameroon) Patrick Ngoula	(Ivory Coast) Gnamien Gislain Yikpe	(Chad) Maher Sharoma	
Al-Jandal	(Ivory Coast) Guillaume Daho	(Tunisia) Youssef Fouzai	(Tunisia) Sabri Zaidi	
Al-Lewaa	(Benin) Sedjro Counou	(Mauritania) Mohamed Soudani	(Nigeria) Daniel Noseki	(Mali) Amadou Samaké
Al-Nairyah	(Tunisia) Hamza Hadda	(Tunisia) Hamza Letifi	(Tunisia) Bilel Touati	
Al-Najma	(Tunisia) Rabii Bouzid	(Tunisia) Adel Hmani	(Tunisia) Othman Saidi	
Al-Nojoom	(Ivory Coast) Lassina Diaby	(Jordan) Mahmoud Shawkat	(Yemen) Nader Sahal	
Al-Qaisumah	(Mauritania) Fody Traoré	(Sudan) Mohammed Al-Dhaw	(Tunisia) Seifeddine Jerbi	
Al-Rawdhah	(Algeria) Mohamed Taib	(Nigeria) Israel Abia	(Tunisia) Bilel Mohsni	
Al-Rayyan	(Brazil) Charles Oliveira	(Senegal) Mouhamadou N'Diaye	(Tunisia) Abdallah Berrabeh	
Al-Riyadh	(Senegal) Elhadji Malick	(Tunisia) Mohamed Aouichi	(Tunisia) Mahmoud Ben Salah	
Al-Sadd	(Brazil) Pingo	(Tunisia) Mohamed Amine Khaloui	(Tunisia) Oussama Omrani	
Al-Safa	(Mali) Ibourahima Sidibé	(Mali) Moussa Coulibaly	(Mauritania) Sidi Touda	
Al-Saqer	(Mauritania) Cheikh Saadné	(Mauritania) Abdullahi Yatma	(Senegal) Mame Balla Diop	
Al-Sharq	(Angola) Aneel Bkaki	(Ghana) Godfred Asante	(Nigeria) Christian Pyagbara	
Al-Taqadom	(Mauritania) Bekaye Wade	(Mauritania) Mohamed M'Bareck	(Niger) Adamou Moussa	
Al-Taraji	(Tunisia) Ahmad Boussaid	(Tunisia) Mehdi Bensib	(Tunisia) Mohammed Ali Ben Abdessalem	
Al-Thoqbah	(Cameroon) Ernest Anang	(Sudan) Khaled Al-Naasan	(Tunisia) Oussema Amdouni	
Al-Washm	(Brazil) Guilherme Café	(Brazil) Lekão	(Brazil) Mateus Totô	(Brazil) Danilo Mariotto (Brazil) Peninha (Chad) Mohammed Alhaj
Al-Zulfi	(Brazil) Paulo Cézar	(Tunisia) Skander Ben Afia	(Tunisia) Youssef Trabelsi	
Arar	(Brazil) Kaká	(Brazil) Vanílson	(Ivory Coast) Lamine N'dao	
Hetten	(Brazil) Douglas Lima	(Brazil) Murilo Souza	(Brazil) Ricardo Verza	
Tuwaiq	(Ghana) Bernard Arthur	(Nigeria) Chidiebere Nwakali	(Tunisia) Bahaeddine Othman	
Wej	(Tunisia) Achraf Ben Dhiaf	(Tunisia) Khaled Gharsellaoui	(Tunisia) Slim Mezlini	

== Group A ==
=== League table ===
Pos	Team	Pld	W	D	L	GF	GA	GD	Pts	Promotion, qualification or relegation
1	Al-Arabi (C, P)	26	16	9	1	42	16	+26	57	Promotion to the FD League and Qualification to the Final
2	Al-Riyadh (P)	26	16	8	2	42	16	+26	56	Qualification for the third place play-offs
3	Al-Entesar	26	10	8	8	40	26	+14	38	
4	Al-Bukiryah	26	9	10	7	37	35	+2	37	
5	Al-Saqer	26	8	11	7	26	26	0	35 (Note: Al-Saqer finished ahead of Al-Rawdhah on overall goal difference: Al-Saqer 0, Al-Rawdhah −4 (Al-Rawdhah 0–1 Al-Saqer, Al-Saqer 0–1 Al-Rawdhah).)	
6	Al-Rawdhah	26	9	8	9	38	42	−4	35	
7	Al-Washm	26	8	8	10	31	34	−3	32	
8	Wej	26	7	10	9	26	30	−4	31	
9	Al-Lewaa	26	6	12	8	29	39	−10	30 (Note: Al-Lewaa finished ahead of Tuwaiq on head-to-head points: Tuwaiq 1–2 Al-Lewaa, Al-Lewaa 1–1 Tuwaiq.)	
10	Tuwaiq	26	7	9	10	23	32	−9	30	
11	Al-Sharq	26	6	9	11	28	32	−4	27 (Note: Al-Sharq finished ahead of Al-Sadd on overall goal difference: Al-Sharq −4, Al-Sadd −15 (Al-Sadd 2–1 Al-Sharq, Al-Sharq 1–0 Al-Sadd).)	
12	Al-Sadd	26	7	6	13	23	38	−15	27	
13	Al-Dahab (R)	26	6	8	12	24	31	−7	26	Relegation to the Third Division
14	Al-Nojoom (R)	26	5	8	13	26	38	−12	23	Relegation to the Third Division

Updated to match(es) played on 30 March 2022. Source: saff.com.sa
Rules for classification: 1) Points; 2) Head-to-Head points; 3) Head-to-Head goal difference; 4) Head-to-Head goals scored; 5) Total goal difference; 6) Total goals scored; 7) Play-off (only for deciding champion, promotion and relegation).
(C) Champions; (P) Promoted; (R) Relegated

=== Results ===
Home \ Away	ARB	BUK	DAH	ENT	LEW	NOJ	RAW	RIY	SAD	SAQ	SHR	WAS	TUW	WEJ
Al-Arabi		2–2	2–0	2–1	2–1	1–0	1–0	1–1	5–0	1–1	1–1	2–1	1–0	2–0
Al-Bukiryah	1–0		2–0	0–0	2–2	4–2	2–2	2–2	2–0	2–0	1–0	3–3	0–0	2–0
Al-Dahab	0–1	1–3		1–1	1–1	1–3	1–0	0–0	0–2	0–0	0–2	3–0	4–0	1–1
Al-Entesar	1–1	6–0	3–0		3–0	2–0	3–1	0–1	0–1	2–0	0–3	1–1	3–2	1–1
Al-Lewaa	0–4	3–2	0–0	1–1		1–1	1–1	1–2	1–1	0–4	3–2	3–2	1–1	3–1
Al-Nojoom	0–0	1–0	1–1	0–2	2–0		1–3	1–1	2–3	1–1	0–0	0–3	4–0	1–2
Al-Rawdhah	1–1	2–4	3–2	3–2	2–1	2–1		0–2	4–1	0–1	1–1	2–2	1–1	1–4
Al-Riyadh	1–2	2–0	2–0	1–1	2–1	4–0	4–1		1–1	3–0	1–1	0–1	0–0	2–0
Al-Sadd	1–1	1–0	1–2	2–4	1–2	1–2	0–2	1–2		0–0	2–1	1–0	0–1	0–0
Al-Saqer	0–0	1–1	0–1	1–0	0–0	3–2	0–1	1–2	0–1		2–1	2–1	1–0	3–2
Al-Sharq	1–3	1–1	0–4	0–1	1–1	1–0	1–1	0–1	1–0	2–2		0–1	3–0	1–2
Al-Washm	1–2	2–1	1–0	1–0	0–0	1–1	0–1	1–2	1–1	2–2	2–2		1–2	2–0
Tuwaiq	0–1	2–0	1–0	2–2	1–2	1–0	3–3	0–1	2–0	0–0	2–1	0–1		0–0
Wej	1–3	0–0	1–1	1–0	0–0	0–0	2–0	0–2	2–1	1–1	0–1	3–0	2–2	

Updated to match(es) played on 30 March 2022. Source: saff.com.sa
Legend: Blue = home team win; Yellow = draw; Red = away team win.
For upcoming matches, an "a" indicates there is an article about the rivalry between the two participants.

== Group B ==
=== League table ===
Pos	Team	Pld	W	D	L	GF	GA	GD	Pts	Promotion, qualification or relegation
1	Al-Qaisumah (P)	26	17	3	6	39	23	+16	54	Promotion to the FD League and Qualification to the Final
2	Al-Taraji	26	15	6	5	41	30	+11	51	Qualification for the third place play-offs
3	Al-Najma	26	14	7	5	47	28	+19	49	
4	Al-Zulfi	26	13	6	7	58	25	+33	45	
5	Al-Ansar	26	9	11	6	38	33	+5	38	
6	Al-Taqadom	26	10	6	10	34	33	+1	36 (Note: Al-Taqadom finished ahead of Hetten on head-to-head points: Al-Taqadom 2–0 Hetten, Hetten 0–2 Al-Taqadom.)	
7	Hetten	26	10	6	10	28	35	−7	36	
8	Al-Jandal	26	8	10	8	42	39	+3	34 (Note: Al-Jandal finished ahead of Al-Safa on head-to-head points: Al-Jandal 1–1 Al-Safa, Al-Safa 0–4 Al-Jandal.)	
9	Al-Safa	26	9	7	10	22	28	−6	34	
10	Al-Rayyan	26	9	5	12	33	46	−13	32	
11	Arar	26	7	6	13	38	50	−12	27	
12	Al-Nairyah	26	5	9	12	21	33	−12	24	
13	Afif (R)	26	4	11	11	33	42	−9	23	Relegation to the Third Division
14	Al-Thoqbah (R)	26	2	7	17	24	53	−29	13	Relegation to the Third Division

Updated to match(es) played on 31 March 2022. Source: Goalzz
Rules for classification: 1) Points; 2) Head-to-Head points; 3) Head-to-Head goal difference; 4) Head-to-Head goal scored; 5) Total goal difference; 6) Total goals scored; 7) Play-off (only for deciding champion, promotion and relegation).
(P) Promoted; (R) Relegated

=== Results ===
Home \ Away	AFI	ANS	JAN	NAI	NAJ	QAI	RAY	SAF	TAQ	TAR	THO	ZUL	ARA	HET
Afif		2–2	1–1	0–0	0–2	0–1	1–4	3–0	2–0	2–3	2–2	1–4	0–1	2–2
Al-Ansar	3–2		1–1	1–0	1–1	1–0	1–2	0–0	1–3	2–2	4–0	3–2	3–1	2–1
Al-Jandal	1–1	2–2		1–2	3–3	1–2	2–1	1–1	0–1	4–1	0–0	4–4	1–4	0–0
Al-Nairyah	0–1	0–1	1–1		2–3	1–2	0–0	2–0	1–1	0–1	0–0	0–3	2–1	1–2
Al-Najma	2–2	1–1	2–1	4–0		1–0	2–3	1–0	2–1	2–0	5–2	2–0	2–4	3–0
Al-Qaisumah	1–1	1–0	2–1	2–1	1–0		3–0	2–1	2–1	0–1	2–1	1–1	4–0	1–0
Al-Rayyan	3–2	2–1	1–0	1–2	1–2	0–3		1–3	1–1	0–1	2–0	3–3	0–4	1–1
Al-Safa	0–0	1–2	0–4	0–0	2–0	1–0	3–0		0–4	0–0	3–2	1–0	2–0	0–1
Al-Taqadom	1–2	1–1	3–4	0–0	1–0	0–2	2–1	1–2		1–0	1–1	0–2	3–3	2–0
Al-Taraji	2–1	3–1	1–2	1–1	1–1	1–1	1–1	3–1	1–0		1–0	1–0	5–2	2–0
Al-Thoqbah	2–2	1–1	1–2	1–2	0–3	0–2	2–3	1–0	0–1	2–3		0–3	2–3	1–3
Al-Zulfi	1–0	1–1	3–0	2–0	0–0	5–0	4–0	0–1	5–1	6–1	3–0		2–3	3–0
Arar	2–2	1–1	1–3	2–2	1–2	2–0	0–1	0–0	0–2	0–3	1–2	1–1		1–2
Hetten	2–1	2–1	0–2	2–1	1–1	2–4	2–1	0–0	0–2	0–2	1–1	1–0	3–0	

Updated to match(es) played on 30 March 2022. Source: saff.com.sa
Legend: Blue = home team win; Yellow = draw; Red = away team win.
For upcoming matches, an "a" indicates there is an article about the rivalry between the two participants.

== Third place play-off ==
Both teams that finish second in Groups A and B will face each other in a two-legged match with the winner gaining promotion to the FD League. The first leg was originally scheduled to be held on 8 April and the second leg on 14 April, however, it was both matches were postponed following an investigation into match-fixing allegations. Al-Riyadh, who finished second in Group A, faced Al-Taraji, who finished second in Group B. The first leg was played on 15 April and the second leg on 20 April. Al-Riyadh defeated Al-Taraji 3–2 on aggregate to earn promotion to the Saudi First Division League.

Team 1	Agg.	Team 2	1st leg	2nd leg
Al-Taraji	2–3	Al-Riyadh	1–1	1–2

First leg

15 April 2022
21:15

Al-Taraji	1–1	Al-Riyadh
Abdessalem 77'	Report	Al-Rashidi 20'

Al-Khaleej Club Stadium, Saihat
Referee: Abdullah Al-Kharboush

Second leg

20 April 2022
21:45

Al-Riyadh	2–1	Al-Taraji
M. Al-Shammeri 55'; Malick 65'	Report	Bensib 28'

Prince Turki bin Abdul Aziz Stadium, Riyadh
Referee: Abdullah Al-Harbi

== Final ==
The winners of each group will play a single-legged final on 20 April to decide the champion of the 2021–22 Second Division. As winners of Group A, Al-Arabi faced Al-Qaisumah, the winners of Group B. The match was held at Al-Arabi's home stadium due to them having more points. Al-Arabi defeated Al-Qaisumah 1–0 to win their second title and first since 1986.

20 April 2022
22:15 AST

Al-Arabi	1–0	Al-Qaisumah
S. Al-Harbi 80'	Report

Department of Education Stadium, Unaizah
Referee: Nahar Al-Baidhani

== Statistics ==
=== Top scorers ===
As of 20 April 2022

Rank	Player	Club	Goals
1	(Nigeria) Israel Abia	Al-Rawdhah	20
1	(Tunisia) Youssef Trabelsi	Al-Zulfi	20
3	(Senegal) Elhadji Malick Tall	Al-Riyadh	17
4	(Brazil) Vanílson	Arar	15
4	(Tunisia) Mohammed Abdessalem	Al-Taraji	15
6	(Saudi Arabia) Fahad Hadl	Al-Qaisumah	14
7	(Tunisia) Ahmad Boussaid	Al-Taraji	13
7	(Chad) Maher Sharoma	Al-Ansar	13
9	(Brazil) Ricardo	Hetten	12
9	(Saudi Arabia) Abdullah Al-Qahtani	Al-Arabi	12

=== Hat-tricks ===
Player	For	Against	Result	Date	Ref.
(Ghana) Emmanuel Banahene	Al-Ansar	Arar	3–1 (H)	9 October 2021	
(Nigeria) Israel Abia	Al-Rawdhah	Al-Sadd	4–1 (H)	23 October 2021	
(Senegal) Elhadji Malick Tall	Al-Riyadh	Al-Rawdhah	4–1 (H)	13 November 2021	
(Nigeria) Israel Abia	Al-Rawdhah	Tuwaiq	3–3 (A)	26 November 2021	
(Angola) Aneel Bakaki	Al-Sharq	Al-Entesar	3–0 (A)	10 December 2021	
(Brazil) Vanílson	Arar	Al-Taqadom	3–3 (A)	18 December 2021	
(Tunisia) Youssef Trabelsi	Al-Zulfi	Al-Qaisumah	5–0 (H)	14 January 2022	
(Brazil) Vanílson	Arar	Al-Jandal	4–1 (A)	5 February 2022	
(Saudi Arabia) Abdullah Al-Qahtani	Al-Arabi	Al-Lewaa	4–0 (A)	11 February 2022	
(Ghana) Bernard Arthur	Al-Taqadom	Al-Safa	4–0 (A)	12 February 2022	
(Tunisia) Youssef Trabelsi	Al-Zulfi	Afif	4–1 (A)	4 March 2022	
(Saudi Arabia) Mohanad Al-Shudukhi	Al-Najma	Al-Thoqbah	5–2 (H)	4 March 2022	
(Chad) Maher Sharoma	Al-Entesar	Al-Bukiryah	6–0 (H)	5 March 2022	
(Tunisia) Youssef Trabelsi	Al-Zulfi	Al-Taqadom	5–1 (H)	11 March 2022	
(Saudi Arabia) Faisal Al-Mutairi	Al-Zulfi	Al-Jandal	4–4 (A)	31 March 2022	

Note

(H) – Home; (A) – Away

== Number of teams by province ==
Rank	Province	Number	Teams
1	Eastern Province	7	Al-Nairyah, Al-Nojoom, Al-Qaisumah, Al-Rawdhah, Al-Safa, Al-Taraji and Al-Thoqbah
1	Riyadh	7	Afif, Al-Riyadh, Al-Sadd, Al-Sharq, Al-Washm, Al-Zulfi and Tuwaiq
3	Al-Qassim	5	Al-Arabi, Al-Bukiryah, Al-Najma, Al-Saqer and Al-Taqadom
4	Ha'il	2	Al-Lewaa and Al-Rayyan
4	Mecca	2	Al-Entesar and Wej
4	Medina	2	Al-Ansar and Al-Dahab
7	Al Jawf	1	Al Jandal
7	Jazan	1	Hetten
7	Northern Borders	1	Arar

== See also ==
- 2021–22 Saudi Professional League
- 2021–22 Saudi First Division League
- 2021–22 Saudi Third Division
