= 2020–21 in Saudi Arabian football =

Football in Saudi Arabia
- Season: 2020–21

Men's football
- Pro League: Al-Hilal
- MS League: Al-Hazem
- Second Division: Al-Akhdoud
- Third Division: Al-Saqer
- King Cup: Al-Faisaly
- Super Cup: Al Nassr

Women's football
- Football League: Challenge

The 2020–21 season was the 64th season of competitive association football in Saudi Arabia. The season featured the first-ever edition of the Women's Football League in Saudi Arabia.

== National teams ==
=== Saudi Arabia national football team ===
==== Friendlies ====
| 14 November 2020 | Saudi Arabia | 3–0 | Jamaica | Riyadh, Saudi Arabia |
| 19:30 UTC+3 | S. Al-Dawsari 10'; Al-Shehri 44'; Al-Buraikan 77' | Report | | Stadium: Prince Faisal bin Fahd Stadium; Attendance: 0 Referee: Ahmed Eisa Darwish (United Arab Emirates) |

| 17 November 2020 | Saudi Arabia | 1–2 | Jamaica | Riyadh, Saudi Arabia |
| 19:30 UTC+3 | Al-Hamdan 29' | Report | Johnson 34'; East 64' | Stadium: Prince Faisal bin Fahd Stadium; Attendance: 0 Referee: Yahya Al Mulla (United Arab Emirates) |

| 25 March 2021 | Saudi Arabia | 1–0 | Kuwait | Riyadh, Saudi Arabia |
| 20:30 UTC+3 | Al-Amri 70' | Report | | Stadium: King Saud University Stadium; Attendance: 0 Referee: Mohamed Bunafoor (Bahrain) |

==== 2022 FIFA World Cup qualification & 2023 AFC Asian Cup qualification ====
===== Second round: Group D =====
| Pos | Team | Pld | W | D | L | GF | GA | GD | Pts | Qualification | Saudi Arabia | Uzbekistan | Palestine | Singapore | Yemen |
|---|---|---|---|---|---|---|---|---|---|---|---|---|---|---|---|
| 1 | Saudi Arabia | 8 | 6 | 2 | 0 | 22 | 4 | +18 | 20 | World Cup qualifying third round and Asian Cup | — | 3–0 | 5–0 | 3–0 | 3–0 |
| 2 | Uzbekistan | 8 | 5 | 0 | 3 | 18 | 9 | +9 | 15 | Asian Cup qualifying third round | 2–3 | — | 2–0 | 5–0 | 5–0 |
| 3 | Palestine | 8 | 3 | 1 | 4 | 10 | 10 | 0 | 10 | Asian Cup qualifying third round | 0–0 | 2–0 | — | 4–0 | 3–0 |
| 4 | Singapore | 8 | 2 | 1 | 5 | 7 | 22 | −15 | 7 | Asian Cup qualifying third round | 0–3 | 1–3 | 2–1 | — | 2–2 |
| 5 | Yemen | 8 | 1 | 2 | 5 | 6 | 18 | −12 | 5 | Asian Cup qualifying third round | 2–2 | 0–1 | 1–0 | 1–2 | — |

Source: FIFA
Rules for classification: Qualification tiebreakers

| 30 March 2021 5 | Saudi Arabia | 5–0 | Palestine | Riyadh, Saudi Arabia |
| 20:30 UTC+3 | Al-Shahrani 37'; Al-Muwallad 43'; Al-Shehri 52', 58'; S. Al-Dawsari 88' (pen.) | Report | | Stadium: King Saud University Stadium; Attendance: 1 Referee: Mohanad Qasim (Iraq) |

| 5 June 2021 6 | Saudi Arabia | 3–0 | Yemen | Riyadh, Saudi Arabia |
| 21:00 UTC+3 | S. Al-Dawsari 4'; Al-Muwallad 17', 32' | Report | | Stadium: King Saud University Stadium; Attendance: 4,382; Referee: Nivon Robesh Gamini (Sri Lanka) |

| 11 June 2021 7 | Singapore | 0–3 | Saudi Arabia | Riyadh, Saudi Arabia |
| 21:00 UTC+3 | | Report | S. Al-Dawsari 84'; Al-Muwallad 86'; Al-Shehri 90+6' | Stadium: King Saud University Stadium; Attendance: 4,879; Referee: Mohanad Qasim (Iraq) |

| 15 June 2021 8 | Saudi Arabia | 3–0 | Uzbekistan | Riyadh, Saudi Arabia |
| 21:00 UTC+3 | Al-Faraj 25', 33'; Al-Hassan 52' | Report | | Stadium: King Saud University Stadium; Attendance: 6,339; Referee: Ko Hyung-jin (South Korea) |

=== Saudi Arabia national under-23 football team ===
==== Friendlies ====
| 13 October 2020 | Saudi Arabia | 0–0 | Ivory Coast | Dammam, Saudi Arabia |
| 18:00 (UTC+3) | | Report | | Stadium: Prince Mohamed bin Fahd Stadium |

| 14 November 2020 | Saudi Arabia | 3–2 | South Africa | Jeddah, Saudi Arabia |
| 19:30 (UTC+3) | Al-Najei 45+1'; Al-Omran 88' (pen.); Solan 90+2' | Report | Lepasa 42'; Lakay 89' | Stadium: King Abdullah Sports City Reserve Stadium |

| 17 November 2020 | Saudi Arabia | 1–1 | South Africa | Jeddah, Saudi Arabia |
| (UTC+3) | Ghareeb 77' (pen.) | Report | Skelem 56' | Stadium: King Abdullah Sports City Reserve Stadium |

| 27 March 2021 | Saudi Arabia | 3–2 | Liberia | Riyadh, Saudi Arabia |
| 17:30 (UTC+3) | Maran 55'; Al-Ghamdi 84'; Al-Eisa 90+6' | Report | Macauley 72'; Dweh 90+2' | Stadium: Prince Faisal bin Fahd Stadium |

| 30 March 2021 | Saudi Arabia | 0–0 | Liberia | Riyadh, Saudi Arabia |
| 17:05 (UTC+3) | | Report | | Stadium: Prince Faisal bin Fahd Stadium |

| 5 June 2021 | Saudi Arabia | Cancelled | Australia | Marbella, Spain |
| 15:00 (UTC+2) | | | | Stadium: Estadio Municipal de Marbella |

| 8 June 2021 | Saudi Arabia | 1–1 | Mexico | Marbella, Spain |
| 20:00 (UTC+2) | Yahya 90+2' (pen.) | Report | Zendejas 69' | Stadium: Estadio Municipal de Marbella |

| 11 June 2021 | Saudi Arabia | 0–2 | Argentina | Marbella, Spain |
| 17:00 (UTC+2) | | Report | De la Vega 58'; Gaich 76' | Stadium: Estadio Municipal de Marbella |

=== Saudi Arabia national under-20 football team ===
==== Friendlies ====
| 5 September 2020 | Croatia | 4–3 | Saudi Arabia | Sveti Martin na Muri, Croatia |
| 20:30 (UTC+2) | Marin 18' (pen.), 71'; Brković 60'; Brnić 85' | Report | Al-Absi 34'; Marran 52'; Al-Ghamdi 77' | Stadium: Igraliste NK Polet Stadium |

| 8 September 2020 | Saudi Arabia | 2–3 | Bulgaria | Sveti Martin na Muri, Croatia |
| 16:00 (UTC+2) | | | | Stadium: Igraliste NK Polet Stadium |

| 11 September 2020 | Indonesia | 3–3 | Saudi Arabia | Sveti Martin na Muri, Croatia |
| 16:30 (UTC+2) | Jauhari 45+1'; Saddam 48'; Braif 90+2' | Report | Al Absi 27' (pen.); Marran 33' (pen.); Khaleel 37' | Stadium: Igraliste NK Polet Stadium |

| 26 October 2020 | Saudi Arabia | 2–0 | Bahrain | Dammam, Saudi Arabia |
| 18:00 (UTC+3) | Al-Nasser 33', 63' | Report | | Stadium: Al-Ettifaq Club Stadium |

| 29 October 2020 | Saudi Arabia | 2–1 | Bahrain | Dammam, Saudi Arabia |
| 17:30 (UTC+3) | Al-Anazi 34'; Maran 77' | Report | 22' | Stadium: Al-Nahda Club Stadium |

| 11 December 2020 | Saudi Arabia | 0–1 | Tanzania | Khobar, Saudi Arabia |
| 15:00 (UTC+3) | | Report | | Stadium: Prince Saud bin Jalawi Stadium |

| 14 December 2020 | Saudi Arabia | 1–0 | Tanzania | Dammam, Saudi Arabia |
| 15:00 (UTC+3) | Al-Absi 58' | Report | | Stadium: Prince Mohamed bin Fahd Stadium |

| 26 March 2021 | Poland | 7–0 | Saudi Arabia | San Pedro del Pinatar, Spain |
| 19:00 CET (UTC+01:00) | Żurawski 7'; Walukiewicz 45'; Benedyczak 57', 80' (pen.), 90'; Kubica 68'; Marchwiński 70' | | | Stadium: Pinatar Arena; Referee: Alfonso Ros Gómez (Spain) |

| 27 March 2021 | Austria | 10–0 | Saudi Arabia | San Pedro del Pinatar, Spain |
| 19:00 CET (UTC+01:00) | | | | Stadium: Pinatar Arena |

| 2 June 2021 | Saudi Arabia | 0–1 | Croatia | Sveti Martin na Muri, Croatia |
| 18:00 (UTC+2) | | Report | | Stadium: Igraliste NK Polet Stadium |

| 5 June 2021 | Saudi Arabia | 1–3 | Slovenia | Sveti Martin na Muri, Croatia |
| 18:00 (UTC+2) | Radif 30' | Report | | Stadium: Igraliste NK Polet Stadium |

| 8 June 2021 | Saudi Arabia | 1–0 | Bosnia and Herzegovina | Sveti Martin na Muri, Croatia |
| 11:00 (UTC+2) | Radif 45+1' (pen.) | Report | | Stadium: Igraliste NK Polet Stadium |

==== 2020 AFC U-19 Championship ====
The AFC announced the cancellation of the tournament on 25 January 2021, leaving the hosting rights for the 2023 AFC U-20 Asian Cup with Uzbekistan.

===== Group C =====
| March 2021 1 | Saudi Arabia | Cancelled | Laos | Namangan, Uzbekistan |
| | | | | Stadium: Navbahor Central Stadium |

| March 2021 2 | Vietnam | Cancelled | Saudi Arabia | Namangan, Uzbekistan |
| | | | | Stadium: Navbahor Central Stadium |

| March 2021 3 | Saudi Arabia | Cancelled | Australia | Tashkent, Uzbekistan |
| | | | | Stadium: Lokomotiv Stadium |

==== 2021 Arab Cup U-20 ====
===== Group D =====
| Pos | Team | Pld | W | D | L | GF | GA | GD | Pts | Qualification |
|---|---|---|---|---|---|---|---|---|---|---|
| 1 | Tunisia | 3 | 3 | 0 | 0 | 5 | 1 | +4 | 9 | Advance to knockout phase |
| 2 | Saudi Arabia | 3 | 2 | 0 | 1 | 5 | 3 | +2 | 6 | Advance to knockout phase |
| 3 | Yemen | 3 | 1 | 0 | 2 | 4 | 5 | −1 | 3 | |
| 4 | Uzbekistan | 3 | 0 | 0 | 3 | 1 | 6 | −5 | 0 | |

Source: GSA
Rules for classification: Group stage tiebreakers

| 21 June 2021 1 | Saudi Arabia | 2–0 | Uzbekistan | Cairo, Egypt |
| 19:00 (UTC+2) | Al-Dawsari 4'; Radif 36' | Report | | Stadium: Osman Ahmed Osman Stadium; Referee: Mohamed Maarouf Eid Mansour (Egypt) |

| 24 June 2021 2 | Yemen | 1–2 | Saudi Arabia | Cairo, Egypt |
| 19:00 (UTC+2) | Hazazi 29' (o.g.) | Report | Radif 28'; Al-Nemer 60' | Stadium: 30 June Stadium; Referee: Sultan Al-Hammadi (United Arab Emirates) |

| 27 June 2021 3 | Tunisia | 2–1 | Saudi Arabia | Cairo, Egypt |
| 19:00 (UTC+2) | Jertila 14', 27' | Report | Al-Nemer 47' | Stadium: 30 June Stadium; Referee: Jalal Jayed (Morocco) |

===== Knockout stage =====
| 30 June 2021 QF | Senegal | 1–1 (2–3 p) | Saudi Arabia | Cairo, Egypt |
| 17:00 (UTC+2) | S. Faye 62' | Report | Radif 43' | Stadium: Cairo International Stadium; Referee: Amir Loussaief (Tunisia) |
| | Penalties |
| | Diaw (penalty missed); Gueye (penalty missed); Cissoko (penalty scored); Diouf (penalty scored); S. Faye (penalty missed) | | (penalty scored) Radif; (penalty scored) Al-Mari; (penalty missed) Al-Dawsari; (penalty scored) Al-Ayeri; (penalty missed) Al-Nemer |

| 3 July 2021 SF | Egypt | 2–3 | Saudi Arabia | Cairo, Egypt |
| 17:00 (UTC+2) | Sherif 45+2'; A. Abdelhamid 51' | Report | Radif 26'; Al-Aliwa 28'; Al-Zaid 69' | Stadium: Cairo International Stadium; Referee: Jalal Jayed (Morocco) |

| 6 July 2021 Final | Saudi Arabia | 2–1 | Algeria | Cairo, Egypt |
| 17:00 (UTC+2) | Al-Juwayr 3'; Baker 77' | Report | Boulbina 54' | Stadium: 30 June Stadium; Referee: Sultan Al-Hammadi (United Arab Emirates) |

=== Saudi Arabia national under-17 football team ===
==== Friendlies ====
| 28 October 2020 | Saudi Arabia | 3–0 | Bahrain | Khobar, Saudi Arabia |
| 15:30 (UTC+3) | | | | Stadium: Prince Saud bin Jalawi Stadium |

| 31 October 2020 | Saudi Arabia | 8–0 | Bahrain | Khobar, Saudi Arabia |
| 15:30 (UTC+3) | | | | Stadium: Prince Saud bin Jalawi Stadium |

| 6 December 2020 | Saudi Arabia | 4–0 | Tunisia | Taif, Saudi Arabia |
| 15:30 (UTC+3) | | | | Stadium: King Fahd Stadium |

| 9 December 2020 | Saudi Arabia | 2–0 | Tunisia | Taif, Saudi Arabia |
| 15:30 (UTC+3) | | | | Stadium: King Fahd Stadium |

| 13 July 2021 | Saudi Arabia | 1–1 | Egypt | Cairo, Egypt |
| 18:00 (UTC+2) | | | | Stadium: Osman Ahmed Osman Stadium |

==== 2020 AFC U-16 Championship ====
The AFC announced the cancellation of the tournament on 25 January 2021, leaving the hosting rights for the 2023 AFC U-17 Asian Cup with Bahrain.

===== Group D =====
| April 2021 1 | Indonesia | Cancelled | Saudi Arabia | Muharraq, Bahrain |
| | | | | Stadium: Al Muharraq Stadium |

| April 2021 2 | Saudi Arabia | Cancelled | Japan | Isa Town, Bahrain |
| | | | | Stadium: Khalifa Sports City Stadium |

| April 2021 3 | Saudi Arabia | Cancelled | China | Riffa, Bahrain |
| | | | | Stadium: Bahrain National Stadium |

==== 2021 Arab Cup U-17 ====
The tournament was initially scheduled to be held from 1 to 17 July, but was postponed indefinitely, and later cancelled.

===== Group A =====
| Pos | Team | Pld | W | D | L | GF | GA | GD | Pts | Qualification |
|---|---|---|---|---|---|---|---|---|---|---|
| 1 | Morocco (H) | 0 | 0 | 0 | 0 | 0 | 0 | 0 | 0 | Knockout stage |
| 2 | Palestine | 0 | 0 | 0 | 0 | 0 | 0 | 0 | 0 | Knockout stage |
| 3 | Saudi Arabia | 0 | 0 | 0 | 0 | 0 | 0 | 0 | 0 | |
| 4 | Kuwait | 0 | 0 | 0 | 0 | 0 | 0 | 0 | 0 | |

First match(es) will be played: TBD. Source: UAFA
Rules for classification: Tiebreakers
(H) Hosts

| 29 July 2021 1 | Kuwait | Cancelled | Saudi Arabia | Morocco |
| 20:00 UTC+1 |

| 2 August 2021 2 | Palestine | Cancelled | Saudi Arabia | Morocco |
| 20:00 UTC+1 |

| 5 August 2021 3 | Saudi Arabia | Cancelled | Morocco | Morocco |
| 20:00 UTC+1 |

== Men's football ==
=== AFC Champions League ===
==== 2020 ====
===== Group stage =====
====== Group A ======
| Pos | Team | Pld | W | D | L | GF | GA | GD | Pts | Qualification | AHL | EST | SHO | WAH |
|---|---|---|---|---|---|---|---|---|---|---|---|---|---|---|
| 1 | (Saudi Arabia) Al-Ahli | 4 | 2 | 0 | 2 | 4 | 6 | −2 | 6 | Advance to knockout stage | — | 2–1 | 1–0 | ~~20 Sep~~ |
| 2 | (Iran) Esteghlal | 4 | 1 | 2 | 1 | 6 | 4 | +2 | 5 | Advance to knockout stage | 3–0 | — | 1–1 | ~~17 Sep~~ |
| 3 | (Iraq) Al-Shorta | 4 | 1 | 2 | 1 | 4 | 4 | 0 | 5 | | 2–1 | 1–1 | — | ~~0–1~~ |
| 4 | (United Arab Emirates) Al-Wahda | 0 | 0 | 0 | 0 | 0 | 0 | 0 | 0 | Withdrew, results expunged (Note: Al-Wahda were unable to travel to Qatar to play the final four matches of the group stage due to several team members having tested positive for COVID-19. They were considered to have withdrawn from the competition, and their results were expunged.) | ~~1–1~~ | ~~14 Sep~~ | ~~23 Sep~~ | — |

Source: AFC
Rules for classification: Tiebreakers

====== Group B ======
| Pos | Team | Pld | W | D | L | GF | GA | GD | Pts | Qualification | PAK | SAH | SHK | HIL |
|---|---|---|---|---|---|---|---|---|---|---|---|---|---|---|
| 1 | (Uzbekistan) Pakhtakor | 4 | 3 | 1 | 0 | 6 | 1 | +5 | 10 | Advance to knockout stage | — | 2–1 | 3–0 | ~~0–0~~ |
| 2 | (United Arab Emirates) Shabab Al-Ahli | 4 | 2 | 1 | 1 | 3 | 2 | +1 | 7 | Advance to knockout stage | 0–0 | — | 1–0 | ~~1–2~~ |
| 3 | (Iran) Shahr Khodro | 4 | 0 | 0 | 4 | 0 | 6 | −6 | 0 | | 0–1 | 0–1 | — | ~~0–0~~ |
| 4 | (Saudi Arabia) Al-Hilal | 0 | 0 | 0 | 0 | 0 | 0 | 0 | 0 | Withdrew, results expunged (Note: Al-Hilal were unable to play their final match of the group stage against Shabab Al-Ahli due to having only 11 fit players after various team members tested positive for COVID-19. They were considered to have withdrawn from the competition, and their results were expunged.) | ~~2–1~~ | ~~23 Sep~~ | ~~2–0~~ | — |

Source: AFC
Rules for classification: Tiebreakers

====== Group C ======
| Pos | Team | Pld | W | D | L | GF | GA | GD | Pts | Qualification | PRS | TAW | DUH | SHJ |
|---|---|---|---|---|---|---|---|---|---|---|---|---|---|---|
| 1 | (Iran) Persepolis | 6 | 3 | 1 | 2 | 8 | 5 | +3 | 10 | Advance to knockout stage | — | 1–0 | 0–1 | 4–0 |
| 2 | (Saudi Arabia) Al-Taawoun | 6 | 3 | 0 | 3 | 4 | 8 | −4 | 9 (Note: Head-to-head points: Al-Taawoun 6, Al-Duhail 0.) | Advance to knockout stage | 0–1 | — | 2–0 | 0–6 |
| 3 | (Qatar) Al-Duhail | 6 | 3 | 0 | 3 | 7 | 8 | −1 | 9 | | 2–0 | 0–1 | — | 2–1 |
| 4 | (United Arab Emirates) Sharjah | 6 | 2 | 1 | 3 | 13 | 11 | +2 | 7 | | 2–2 | 0–1 | 4–2 | — |

Source: AFC
Rules for classification: Tiebreakers

====== Group D ======
| Pos | Team | Pld | W | D | L | GF | GA | GD | Pts | Qualification | NAS | SAD | SEP | AIN |
|---|---|---|---|---|---|---|---|---|---|---|---|---|---|---|
| 1 | (Saudi Arabia) Al-Nassr | 6 | 3 | 2 | 1 | 9 | 5 | +4 | 11 | Advance to knockout stage | — | 2–2 | 2–0 | 0–1 |
| 2 | (Qatar) Al-Sadd | 6 | 2 | 3 | 1 | 14 | 8 | +6 | 9 | Advance to knockout stage | 1–1 | — | 3–0 | 4–0 |
| 3 | (Iran) Sepahan | 6 | 2 | 1 | 3 | 6 | 8 | −2 | 7 | | 0–2 | 2–1 | — | 0–0 |
| 4 | (United Arab Emirates) Al-Ain | 6 | 1 | 2 | 3 | 5 | 13 | −8 | 5 | | 1–2 | 3–3 | 0–4 | — |

Source: AFC
Rules for classification: Tiebreakers

===== Knockout stage =====
====== Round of 16 ======
| Team 1 | Score | Team 2 |
|---|---|---|
| Al-Ahli (Saudi Arabia) | 1–1 (a.e.t.) (4–3 p) | (United Arab Emirates) Shabab Al-Ahli |
| Al-Nassr (Saudi Arabia) | 1–0 | (Saudi Arabia) Al-Taawoun |

====== Quarter-finals ======
| Team 1 | Score | Team 2 |
|---|---|---|
| Al-Nassr (Saudi Arabia) | 2–0 | (Saudi Arabia) Al-Ahli |

====== Semi-finals ======
| Team 1 | Score | Team 2 |
|---|---|---|
| Al-Nassr (Saudi Arabia) | 1–1 (a.e.t.) (3–5 p) | (Iran) Persepolis |

==== 2021 ====
===== Qualifying play-offs =====
====== Play-off round ======
| Team 1 | Score | Team 2 |
|---|---|---|
| Al-Wehda (Saudi Arabia) | 1–1 (a.e.t.) (2–3 p) | (Iraq) Al-Quwa Al-Jawiya |

===== Group stage =====
====== Group A ======
| Pos | Team | Pld | W | D | L | GF | GA | GD | Pts | Qualification | IST | HIL | SAH | AGK |
|---|---|---|---|---|---|---|---|---|---|---|---|---|---|---|
| 1 | (Tajikistan) Istiklol | 6 | 3 | 1 | 2 | 10 | 8 | +2 | 10 (Note: Head-to-head goal difference: Istiklol 1, Al Hilal −1.) | Advance to Round of 16 | — | 4–1 | 0–0 | 1–2 |
| 2 | (Saudi Arabia) Al-Hilal (H) | 6 | 3 | 1 | 2 | 11 | 9 | +2 | 10 | Advance to Round of 16 | 3–1 | — | 0–2 | 2–2 |
| 3 | (United Arab Emirates) Shabab Al-Ahli | 6 | 2 | 1 | 3 | 6 | 6 | 0 | 7 (Note: Head-to-head goal difference: Shabab Al-Ahli 1, AGMK −1.) | | 0–1 | 0–2 | — | 3–1 |
| 4 | (Uzbekistan) AGMK | 6 | 2 | 1 | 3 | 9 | 13 | −4 | 7 | | 2–3 | 0–3 | 2–1 | — |

Source: AFC
Rules for classification: Tiebreakers
(H) Hosts

====== Group C ======
| Pos | Team | Pld | W | D | L | GF | GA | GD | Pts | Qualification | EST | DUH | AHL | SHO |
|---|---|---|---|---|---|---|---|---|---|---|---|---|---|---|
| 1 | (Iran) Esteghlal | 6 | 3 | 2 | 1 | 14 | 8 | +6 | 11 | Advance to Round of 16 | — | 2–2 | 5–2 | 1–0 |
| 2 | (Qatar) Al-Duhail | 6 | 2 | 3 | 1 | 11 | 9 | +2 | 9 | | 4–3 | — | 1–1 | 2–0 |
| 3 | (Saudi Arabia) Al-Ahli (H) | 6 | 2 | 3 | 1 | 9 | 8 | +1 | 9 | | 0–0 | 1–1 | — | 2–1 |
| 4 | (Iraq) Al-Shorta | 6 | 1 | 0 | 5 | 3 | 12 | −9 | 3 | | 0–3 | 2–1 | 0–3 | — |

Source: AFC
Rules for classification: Tiebreakers
(H) Hosts

====== Group D ======
| Pos | Team | Pld | W | D | L | GF | GA | GD | Pts | Qualification | NAS | SAD | WEH | FOO |
|---|---|---|---|---|---|---|---|---|---|---|---|---|---|---|
| 1 | (Saudi Arabia) Al-Nassr (H) | 6 | 3 | 2 | 1 | 9 | 5 | +4 | 11 | Advance to Round of 16 | — | 3–1 | 1–2 | 2–0 |
| 2 | (Qatar) Al-Sadd | 6 | 3 | 1 | 2 | 9 | 7 | +2 | 10 | | 1–2 | — | 3–1 | 1–1 |
| 3 | (Jordan) Al-Wehdat | 6 | 2 | 1 | 3 | 4 | 7 | −3 | 7 | | 0–0 | 0–2 | — | 1–0 |
| 4 | (Iran) Foolad | 6 | 1 | 2 | 3 | 3 | 6 | −3 | 5 | | 1–1 | 0–1 | 1–0 | — |

Source: AFC
Rules for classification: Tiebreakers
(H) Hosts

====== Ranking of second-placed teams ======
| Pos | Grp | Team | Pld | W | D | L | GF | GA | GD | Pts | Qualification |
|---|---|---|---|---|---|---|---|---|---|---|---|
| 1 | E | (United Arab Emirates) Al-Wahda | 6 | 4 | 1 | 1 | 7 | 3 | +4 | 13 | Advance to Round of 16 |
| 2 | B | (Iran) Tractor | 6 | 2 | 4 | 0 | 6 | 3 | +3 | 10 | Advance to Round of 16 |
| 3 | A | (Saudi Arabia) Al-Hilal | 6 | 3 | 1 | 2 | 11 | 9 | +2 | 10 | Advance to Round of 16 |
| 4 | D | (Qatar) Al-Sadd | 6 | 3 | 1 | 2 | 9 | 7 | +2 | 10 | |
| 5 | C | (Qatar) Al-Duhail | 6 | 2 | 3 | 1 | 11 | 9 | +2 | 9 | |

Source: AFC
Rules for classification: 1) Points; 2) Goal difference; 3) Goals scored; 4) Disciplinary points; 5) Drawing of lots.

=== Leagues ===
==== Saudi Professional League ====
| Pos | Team | Pld | W | D | L | GF | GA | GD | Pts | Qualification or relegation |
|---|---|---|---|---|---|---|---|---|---|---|
| 1 | Al-Hilal (C) | 30 | 18 | 7 | 5 | 60 | 27 | +33 | 61 | Qualification for AFC Champions League group stage |
| 2 | Al-Shabab | 30 | 17 | 6 | 7 | 68 | 43 | +25 | 57 | Qualification for AFC Champions League group stage |
| 3 | Al-Ittihad (Note: Al-Ittihad cannot qualify for Asian Football Confederation competitions as they did not obtain an AFC license.) | 30 | 15 | 11 | 4 | 45 | 29 | +16 | 56 | |
| 4 | Al-Taawoun | 30 | 13 | 8 | 9 | 42 | 30 | +12 | 47 (Note: Positions determined by head-to-head points: Al-Taawoun 4 pts; Al-Ettifaq 1 pt.) | Qualification for AFC Champions League play-off round |
| 5 | Al-Ettifaq | 30 | 14 | 5 | 11 | 50 | 48 | +2 | 47 | |
| 6 | Al-Nassr | 30 | 13 | 7 | 10 | 53 | 40 | +13 | 46 | |
| 7 | Al-Fateh | 30 | 12 | 6 | 12 | 55 | 55 | 0 | 42 | |
| 8 | Al-Ahli | 30 | 11 | 6 | 13 | 44 | 56 | −12 | 39 | |
| 9 | Al-Faisaly | 30 | 9 | 9 | 12 | 42 | 47 | −5 | 36 (Note: Positions determined by head-to-head points: Al-Faisaly: 16 pts; Al-Raed: 15 pts; Damac: 13 pts; Al-Batin: 12 pts; Abha: 3 pts.) | Qualification for the Champions League group stage (Note: Al-Faisaly qualified for the Champions League group stage as 2020–21 King Cup winners.) |
| 10 | Al-Raed | 30 | 10 | 6 | 14 | 44 | 47 | −3 | 36 | |
| 11 | Damac | 30 | 9 | 9 | 12 | 43 | 48 | −5 | 36 | |
| 12 | Al-Batin | 30 | 9 | 9 | 12 | 43 | 55 | −12 | 36 | |
| 13 | Abha | 30 | 10 | 6 | 14 | 42 | 50 | −8 | 36 | |
| 14 | Al-Qadsiah (R) | 30 | 8 | 11 | 11 | 41 | 47 | −6 | 35 | Relegation to MS League |
| 15 | Al-Wehda (R) | 30 | 9 | 5 | 16 | 40 | 60 | −20 | 32 | Relegation to MS League |
| 16 | Al-Ain (R) | 30 | 5 | 5 | 20 | 34 | 64 | −30 | 20 | Relegation to MS League |

Source: spl.com source=إحصائيات رابطة دوري المحترفين السعودي 2020-2021
Rules for classification: 1) Points; 2) Head-to-head points; 3) Head-to-head goal difference; 4) Total goal difference; 5) Total goals scored; 6) Fair-play points (Note: Head-to-head record is used only after all the matches between the teams in question have been played).
(C) Champions; (R) Relegated

==== Prince Mohammad bin Salman League ====
| Pos | Team | Pld | W | D | L | GF | GA | GD | Pts | Promotion, qualification or relegation |
|---|---|---|---|---|---|---|---|---|---|---|
| 1 | Al-Hazem (C, P) | 38 | 28 | 7 | 3 | 77 | 27 | +50 | 91 | Promotion to the Pro League |
| 2 | Al-Fayha (P) | 38 | 24 | 9 | 5 | 72 | 27 | +45 | 81 | Promotion to the Pro League |
| 3 | Al-Tai (P) | 38 | 23 | 8 | 7 | 58 | 33 | +25 | 77 | Promotion to the Pro League |
| 4 | Al-Jabalain | 38 | 22 | 10 | 6 | 53 | 27 | +26 | 76 | |
| 5 | Hajer | 38 | 15 | 10 | 13 | 49 | 37 | +12 | 55 | |
| 6 | Ohod | 38 | 13 | 15 | 10 | 51 | 52 | −1 | 54 | |
| 7 | Al-Kawkab | 38 | 13 | 13 | 12 | 47 | 48 | −1 | 52 (Note: Al-Kawkab finished ahead of Al-Khaleej on overall goal difference: Al-Kawkab −1, Al-Khaleej −5 (Al-Kawkab 2–2 Al-Khaleej, Al-Khaleej 0–0 Al-Kawkab).) | |
| 8 | Al-Khaleej | 38 | 13 | 13 | 12 | 42 | 47 | −5 | 52 | |
| 9 | Al-Shoulla | 38 | 13 | 12 | 13 | 37 | 33 | +4 | 51 | |
| 10 | Al-Diriyah | 38 | 13 | 9 | 16 | 34 | 39 | −5 | 48 (Note: Al-Diriyah finished ahead of Jeddah on overall goal difference: Al-Diriyah −5, Jeddah −6 (Jeddah 1–2 Al-Diriyah, Al-Diriyah 0–1 Jeddah).) | |
| 11 | Jeddah | 38 | 13 | 9 | 16 | 48 | 54 | −6 | 48 | |
| 12 | Al-Adalah | 38 | 10 | 16 | 12 | 44 | 39 | +5 | 46 (Note: Al-Adalah finished ahead of Al-Sahel on head-to-head points: Al-Adalah 3–0 Al-Sahel, Al-Sahel 1–2 Al-Adalah.) | |
| 13 | Al-Sahel | 38 | 11 | 13 | 14 | 34 | 48 | −14 | 46 | |
| 14 | Al-Jeel | 38 | 11 | 11 | 16 | 37 | 52 | −15 | 44 | |
| 15 | Najran | 38 | 10 | 13 | 15 | 43 | 47 | −4 | 43 | |
| 16 | Al-Nahda | 38 | 9 | 15 | 14 | 37 | 45 | −8 | 42 | |
| 17 | Al-Bukayriyah (R) | 38 | 11 | 7 | 20 | 29 | 48 | −19 | 40 | Relegation to the Second Division |
| 18 | Al-Thoqbah (R) | 38 | 10 | 7 | 21 | 45 | 60 | −15 | 37 | Relegation to the Second Division |
| 19 | Arar (R) | 38 | 4 | 14 | 20 | 28 | 62 | −34 | 26 | Relegation to the Second Division |
| 20 | Al-Nojoom (R) | 38 | 6 | 5 | 27 | 27 | 67 | −40 | 23 | Relegation to the Second Division |

Source: goalzz.com
Rules for classification: 1) Points; 2) Head-to-head points; 3) Head-to-head goal difference; 4) Total goal difference; 5) Total goals scored; 6) Fair-play points (Note: Head-to-head record is used only after all the matches between the teams in question have been played).
(C) Champions; (P) Promoted; (R) Relegated

==== Saudi Second Division ====
===== Group A =====
| Pos | Team | Pld | W | D | L | GF | GA | GD | Pts | Promotion, qualification or relegation |
|---|---|---|---|---|---|---|---|---|---|---|
| 1 | Al-Akhdoud (C, P) | 26 | 15 | 8 | 3 | 42 | 22 | +20 | 53 | Promotion to the MS League and Qualification to the Final |
| 2 | Bisha (P) | 26 | 13 | 10 | 3 | 40 | 19 | +21 | 49 | Promotion to MS League |
| 3 | Al-Jandal | 26 | 14 | 6 | 6 | 35 | 22 | +13 | 48 | |
| 4 | Al-Qaisumah | 26 | 12 | 9 | 5 | 37 | 24 | +13 | 45 | |
| 5 | Al-Safa | 26 | 8 | 10 | 8 | 31 | 32 | −1 | 34 | |
| 6 | Al-Entesar | 26 | 8 | 9 | 9 | 26 | 30 | −4 | 33 (Note: Al-Entesar finished ahead of Al-Sadd on head-to-head points: Al-Entesar 0–0 Al-Sadd, Al-Sadd 0–1 Al-Entesar.) | |
| 7 | Al-Sadd | 26 | 7 | 12 | 7 | 29 | 28 | +1 | 33 | |
| 8 | Al-Ansar | 26 | 8 | 7 | 11 | 24 | 27 | −3 | 31 (Note: Al-Ansar finished ahead of Al-Zulfi on overall goal difference: Al-Ansar −3, Al-Zulfi −6 (Al-Ansar 1–0 Al-Zulfi, Al-Zulfi 1–0 Al-Ansar).) | |
| 9 | Al-Zulfi | 26 | 8 | 7 | 11 | 29 | 35 | −6 | 31 | |
| 10 | Al-Arabi | 26 | 5 | 12 | 9 | 29 | 37 | −8 | 27 (Note: Al-Arabi finished ahead of Al-Lewa on head-to-head points: Al-Arabi 0–0 Al-Lewa, Al-Lewa 1–3 Al-Arabi.) | |
| 11 | Al-Lewa | 26 | 6 | 9 | 11 | 30 | 39 | −9 | 27 | |
| 12 | Al-Taqadom | 26 | 4 | 13 | 9 | 27 | 34 | −7 | 25 (Note: Al-Taqadom finished ahead of Al-Hejaz on overall goal difference: Al-Taqadom −7, Al-Hejaz −16 (Al-Taqadom 1–3 Al-Hejaz, Al-Hejaz 1–3 Al-Taqadom).) | |
| 13 | Al-Hejaz (R) | 26 | 6 | 7 | 13 | 28 | 44 | −16 | 25 | Relegation to the Third Division |
| 14 | Kumait (R) | 26 | 3 | 11 | 12 | 28 | 42 | −14 | 20 | Relegation to the Third Division |

Source: Goalzz
Rules for classification: 1) Points; 2) Head-to-Head points; 3) Head-to-Head goal difference; 4) Head-to-Head goal scored; 5) Total goal difference; 6) Total goals scored; 7) Play-off (only for deciding champion, promotion and relegation).
(C) Champions; (P) Promoted; (R) Relegated

===== Group B =====
| Pos | Team | Pld | W | D | L | GF | GA | GD | Pts | Promotion, qualification or relegation |
|---|---|---|---|---|---|---|---|---|---|---|
| 1 | Al-Orobah (P) | 26 | 16 | 6 | 4 | 51 | 28 | +23 | 54 | Promotion to the MS League and Qualification to the Final |
| 2 | Al-Kholood (P) | 26 | 15 | 3 | 8 | 40 | 21 | +19 | 48 | Promotion to MS League |
| 3 | Al-Washm | 26 | 12 | 9 | 5 | 47 | 28 | +19 | 45 | |
| 4 | Al-Riyadh | 26 | 12 | 8 | 6 | 47 | 34 | +13 | 44 | |
| 5 | Al-Rawdhah | 26 | 11 | 5 | 10 | 37 | 37 | 0 | 38 | |
| 6 | Al-Najma | 26 | 9 | 8 | 9 | 36 | 40 | −4 | 35 (Note: Al-Najma finished ahead of Al-Taraji on head-to-head points: Al-Najma 1–1 Al-Taraji, Al-Taraji 0–1 Al-Najma.) | |
| 7 | Al-Taraji | 26 | 9 | 8 | 9 | 31 | 35 | −4 | 35 | |
| 8 | Al-Sharq | 26 | 9 | 7 | 10 | 31 | 30 | +1 | 34 (Note: Al-Sharq finished ahead of Wej on head-to-head points: Al-Sharq 1–0 Wej, Wej 1–2 Al-Sharq.) | |
| 9 | Wej | 26 | 10 | 4 | 12 | 36 | 40 | −4 | 34 | |
| 10 | Hetten | 26 | 9 | 6 | 11 | 28 | 34 | −6 | 33 | |
| 11 | Afif | 26 | 8 | 7 | 11 | 35 | 47 | −12 | 31 | |
| 12 | Al-Dahab | 26 | 6 | 7 | 13 | 25 | 34 | −9 | 25 | |
| 13 | Al-Mujazzal (R) | 26 | 7 | 3 | 16 | 33 | 46 | −13 | 24 | Relegation to the Third Division |
| 14 | Al-Selmiyah (R) | 26 | 5 | 7 | 14 | 24 | 47 | −23 | 22 | Relegation to the Third Division |

Source: Goalzz
Rules for classification: 1) Points; 2) Head-to-Head points; 3) Head-to-Head goal difference; 4) Head-to-Head goal scored; 5) Total goal difference; 6) Total goals scored; 7) Play-off (only for deciding champion, promotion and relegation).
(P) Promoted; (R) Relegated

===== Third-place play-off =====
15 April 2021
22:00 AST

| Bisha | 1–4 | Al-Kholood |
|---|---|---|
| Al-Bishi 3' | Report | Al-Ruwailli 18'; Kharmi 35'; Salem 45+1'; Al-Khaibari 79' |

Bisha University Stadium, Bisha

===== Final =====
19 April 2021
22:00 AST

| Al-Orobah | 3–3 (a.e.t.) | Al-Akhdoud |
|---|---|---|
| Rayllan 35'; Al-Enezi 76'; M. Al-Shammari 78' | Report | Taylon 8', 19', 45+2' |
Penalties
| M. Al-Shammari (penalty missed); Rayllan (penalty scored); Bensib (penalty scored); Mansour (penalty missed) | 2–4 | (penalty scored) Mendes; (penalty scored) Al-Harthi; (penalty scored) Al-Shehri; (penalty scored) Al-Zubaidi |

Al-Orobah Club Stadium, Sakakah

==== Saudi Third Division ====
| Champions | Runners-up | Semi-finalists |
|---|---|---|
| Al-Saqer | Al-Nairyah | Al-Rayyan and Tuwaiq |

=== Cup competitions ===
==== King Cup ====
===== Final =====
27 May 2021
21:00 AST

| Al-Taawoun | 2–3 | Al-Faisaly |
|---|---|---|
| Tawamba 14'; Kaku 45' (pen.) | Report | Tavares 40' (pen.), 60', 90+3' |

King Fahd International Stadium, Riyadh
Attendance: (Note: Attendance was capped at 40% due to the COVID-19 pandemic in Saudi Arabia.)
Referee: Szymon Marciniak (Poland)

==== Super Cup ====
30 January 2021
20:15 SAST

| Al-Hilal | 0–3 | Al-Nassr |
|---|---|---|
| | Report | Petros 61'; Hamdallah 82'; Al-Najei 90+2' |

King Fahd International Stadium, Riyadh
Attendance: 0 (Note: The match was played behind closed doors due to the COVID-19 pandemic in Saudi Arabia.)
Referee: Daniele Orsato (Italy)

== Women's football ==
=== League ===
==== Football League ====
| Champions | Runners-up | Semi-finalists |
|---|---|---|
| Challenge | Jeddah Eagles | Eastern Flames and The Storm |
