= 2021–22 Saudi First Division League =

First Division League
- Season: 2021–22
- Dates: 6 September 2021 – 28 May 2022
- Champions: Al-Khaleej (2nd title)
- Promoted: Al-Khaleej; Al-Adalah; Al-Wehda
- Relegated: Al-Jeel; Al-Diriyah; Al-Nahda; Al-Kawkab; Bisha
- Matches: 380
- Goals: 825 (2.17 per match)
- Top goalscorer: Carolus Andria (25 goals)
- Biggest home win: Al-Sahel 5–0 Al-Khaleej (5 January 2022)
- Biggest away win: Al-Qadsiah 0–4 Al-Sahel (5 October 2021); Al-Jeel 1–5 Al-Khaleej (18 January 2022); Al-Kawkab 0–4 Al-Ain (23 May 2022)
- Highest scoring: Al-Jeel 3–6 Al-Sahel (14 December 2021)
- Longest winning run: Hajer; Ohod (5 matches)
- Longest unbeaten run: Al-Sahel (10 matches)
- Longest winless run: Al-Kawkab (26 matches)
- Longest losing run: Bisha (7 matches)
- All statistics correct as of 28 May 2022.

The 2021–22 First Division League (known as the Yelo League for sponsorship reasons) was the first season of the Saudi First Division League after its rebrand, and the 45th season of the Saudi First Division since its establishment in 1976. The season started on 6 September 2021 and concluded on 28 May 2022.

All three teams were promoted on the final day of the season. Al-Khaleej were promoted and crowned champions following a 0–0 away draw with Najran. Al-Adalah were promoted following a 0–0 draw away to Jeddah. Al-Wehda were promoted following a 3–0 away win against Al-Diriyah.

Bisha were the first team to be relegated on 5 May. They were relegated following a 2–1 defeat away to Al-Adalah. Al-Kawkab were relegated a day later following a 2–0 home defeat to Al-Jabalain. Al-Nahda became the third side to be relegated following a 3–0 defeat away to Ohod on 18 May. On 23 May, Al-Diriyah became the fourth side to be relegated despite a 2–1 away win against Bisha. On the final matchday, Al-Jeel became the fifth and final side to be relegated despite a 2–1 away win against Al-Nahda.

== Overview ==
=== Changes ===
On 9 October 2020, the Saudi FF announced that the number of teams in the league would be decreased to 18 starting from the 2022–23 season. To prepare for these changes it was announced that 5 teams would be relegated in the 2021–22 season and only 3 teams would be promoted from the 2021–22 Second Division.

=== Rebrand ===
On 26 August 2021, the newly appointed executive director of the FDL, Talal Al-Obaidi, announced a rebrand; beginning with the 2021–22 season, the competition would be known as the First Division League (FDL). As part of the rebranding, a new logo was introduced.

=== Name sponsorship ===
On 1 September 2021, the FDL announced a sponsorship with car rental company Yelo. As part of the sponsorship deal, the First Division League would be known as the Yelo League for the next 3 seasons.

== Team changes ==
The following teams have changed division since the 2021–22 season.

=== To the First Division League ===
Promoted from Second Division

- Al-Okhdood
- Al-Orobah
- Al-Kholood
- Bisha

Relegated from Pro League

- Al-Qadsiah
- Al-Wehda
- Al-Ain

=== From the First Division League ===
Promoted to Pro League

- Al-Hazem
- Al-Fayha
- Al-Tai

Relegated to Second Division

- Al-Bukayriyah
- Al-Thoqbah
- Arar
- Al-Nojoom

== Teams ==
A total of 20 teams are contesting the league, including 13 sides from the 2020–21 season, 4 promoted teams from the Second Division and the three relegated sides from the Pro League.

The first club to be relegated to the First Division League was Al-Ain, who were relegated after only a year in the top flight 2–0 defeat away to Al-Nassr on 14 May 2021. In the final matchday, both Al-Qadsiah and Al-Wehda were relegated following a draw with Abha and a loss against Al-Shabab respectively. Al-Qadsiah were relegated after only a year in the top flight while Al-Wehda were relegated after three years in the top flight.

The first club to be promoted was Al-Orobah who were promoted despite a 1–0 away defeat to Afif on 27 March 2021. On 3 April 2021, both Al-Okhdood and Bisha were promoted. Al-Okhdood were promoted following a 1–1 draw with Al-Taqadom while Bisha were promoted following a 2–0 win over Al-Jandal. The final club to be promoted was Al-Kholood, who were promoted following a 3–1 away win over Al-Dahab in the final matchday.

Al-Okhdood defeated Al-Orobah 4–2 on penalties (3–3 after extra time) to win their second title and first since 1992.

Al-Kholood and Bisha will play in the First Division League for the first time in their history. Al-Orobah return after an absence of two seasons and will play in their 13th overall season in the First Division League. Al-Okhdood return to the First Division League for the first time since the 1992–93 season. They will play in their 2nd season in the First Division League.

=== Stadia and locations ===
Locations of teams in the 2021–22 First Division League

Note: Table lists in alphabetical order.

Team	Location	Stadium	Capacity
Al-Adalah	Al-Hasa (Al-Hulaylah)	Prince Abdullah bin Jalawi Stadium; Hajer Club Stadium	26,000; 12,000
Al-Ain	Al Bahah	King Saud Sport City Stadium	10,000
Al-Diriyah	Diriyah	Prince Turki bin Abdul Aziz Stadium (Riyadh)	15,000
Al-Jabalain	Ha'il	Prince Abdul Aziz bin Musa'ed Stadium	12,000
Al-Jeel	Al-Hasa (Hofuf)	Prince Abdullah bin Jalawi Stadium; Hajer Club Stadium	26,000; 12,000
Al-Kawkab	Al-Kharj	Al-Shoulla Club Stadium	5,200
Al-Khaleej	Saihat	Al-Khaleej Club Stadium	10,000
Al-Kholood	Ar Rass	Al-Hazem Club Stadium; Al-Bukiryah Club Stadium (Al Bukayriyah)	8,000; 5,000
Al-Nahda	Dammam	Prince Fahd bin Salman Stadium; Prince Mohamed bin Fahd Stadium	15,000; 35,000
Al-Okhdood	Najran	Prince Hathloul bin Abdul Aziz Sport City Stadium; Najran University Stadium	12,000; 10,000
Al-Orobah	Sakakah	Al-Orobah Club Stadium	6,000
Al-Qadsiah	Khobar	Prince Saud bin Jalawi Stadium	15,000
Al-Sahel	Anak	Prince Saud bin Jalawi Stadium (Khobar)	15,000
Al-Shoulla	Al-Kharj	Al-Shoulla Club Stadium	5,200
Al-Wehda	Mecca	King Abdul Aziz Stadium	38,000
Bisha	Bisha	Bisha University Stadium; King Saud Sport City Stadium (Al Bahah)	2,000; 10,000
Hajer	Al-Hasa (Hofuf)	Hajer Club Stadium; Prince Abdullah bin Jalawi Stadium	12,000; 26,000
Jeddah	Jeddah	Reserve Stadium in King Abdullah Sports City	1,000
Najran	Najran	Prince Hathloul bin Abdul Aziz Sport City Stadium; Najran University Stadium	12,000; 10,000
Ohod	Medina	Prince Mohammed bin Abdul Aziz Stadium	24,000

=== Foreign players ===
On 26 June 2021, the Saudi FF announced that the number of foreign players was increased from 4 players to 5 players.

Players name in bold indicates the player is registered during the mid-season transfer window.

Club	Player 1	Player 2	Player 3	Player 4	Player 5	Former Players
Al-Adalah	(Brazil) Alan	(Brazil) Nailson	(Mali) Ibrahima Tandia	(Nigeria) Tunde Adeniji	(Nigeria) **Ogenyi Onazi**	(Tunisia) Achraf Krir
Al-Ain	(Chad) Othman Alhaj	(Chad) Othman Hassan				(Nigeria) Reuben Gabriel
Al-Diriyah	(Algeria) Hacène Ogbi	(Brazil) Wesley	(Cameroon) Marius Obekop	(Ghana) **Joseph Adjei**	(Syria) **Mahmoud Al-Youssef**	(Brazil) Gelson (Nigeria) Ibrahim Salis
Al-Jabalain	(Algeria) **Nabil Saâdou**	(Brazil) Rogerinho	(Brazil) Teco	(Ecuador) **Marlon**	(Portugal) Ricardo Ribeiro	(Brazil) Jefferson (Brazil) Tiago Orobó
Al-Jeel	(Somalia) Faisal Abu Bakr	(Senegal) **Abdou Aziz Ndiaye**	(Syria) Abdullah Jenyat	(Tunisia) **Zied El Bakouch**	(Tunisia) Aymen Trabelsi	(Brazil) Romarinho (Syria) Ahmad Al Douni
Al-Kawkab	(France) Franck Julienne	(Morocco) Badreddine Benachour	(Senegal) Falou Samb	(Tunisia) Hamza Ben Abda	(Tunisia) Oussema Ben Ayed	
Al-Khaleej	(Brazil) Diego Miranda	(Ivory Coast) Mamadou Soro	(Ghana) Samuel Sarfo	(Serbia) Miodrag Gemović	(Tunisia) Mondher Guesmi	
Al-Kholood	(Algeria) Islam Chahrour	(Algeria) **Nasreddine Zaâlani**	(Jordan) **Malek Shalabiya**	(Nigeria) **Aniekpeno Udo**	(Tunisia) Khemais Maaouani	(Algeria) Sid Ahmed Aouadj (Mauritania) Mohamed Salem (Nigeria) Prince Obus Aggreh
Al-Nahda	(Algeria) **Rachid Nadji**	(Jordan) **Mohammad Zureiqat**	(Morocco) **Nabil Aankour**	(Sudan) Abdulaziz Noor	(Tunisia) Bilel Souissi	(Ghana) Michael Sarpong (Nigeria) Ifeanyi Anaemena (Tunisia) Fehmi Kacem
Al-Okhdood	(Brazil) Kaká Mendes	(Brazil) Maicon Douglas	(Brazil) Reinaldo Dutra	(Oman) **Issam Al Sabhi**	(Tunisia) **Alaya Brigui**	(Brazil) Hugo Cabral (Brazil) Taylon Correa
Al-Orobah	(Brazil) Rayllan Bruno	(Brazil) **Dudu**	(Brazil) Philipe Maia	(Mali) Aboubacar Diarra	(Senegal) Abdoulaye Dieng	(Cape Verde) Héldon Ramos
Al-Qadsiah	(Burundi) **Cédric Amissi**	(Ivory Coast) Ibrahim Diomandé	(Madagascar) **Ibrahim Amada**	(Morocco) **Moha Rharsalla**	(Serbia) Uroš Vitas	(Brazil) Carlão (Brazil) Leandro Carvalho (Brazil) Muralha
Al-Sahel	(Brazil) Jhonnattann Benites	(Brazil) Uilliam	(Brazil) Victor	(Ghana) Lawson Bekui	(Nigeria) Daniel Ajibola	
Al-Shoulla	(Brazil) Pitty	(Ivory Coast) Sylla Daouda	(Guinea-Bissau) Piqueti	(Senegal) **Omar Wade**	(Zimbabwe) **Ovidy Karuru**	(Croatia) Mario Budimir
Al-Wehda	(Eritrea) Ahmed Abdu Jaber	(France) **Karim Yoda**	(Guinea) **Ousmane Barry**	(Ivory Coast) **Soualio Ouattara**	(Spain) Alberto Botía	
Bisha	(Algeria) **Sid Ahmed Aouadj**	(Ivory Coast) **Guillaume Daho**	(Guinea) **Seydouba Camara**	(Tunisia) Seifeddine Akremi	(Tunisia) Mohamed Ben Tarcha	(Algeria) Kaddour Beldjilali (Kenya) Elvis Rupia (Zambia) Saith Sakala
Hajer	(Brazil) Adriano Pardal	(Brazil) Fernando Gabriel	(Brazil) Lázaro	(Ivory Coast) Ismail Kouakou	(Mali) Modibo Maïga	
Jeddah	(Egypt) **Mohammad Fouad**	(Ivory Coast) **Junior Magbi**	(Portugal) Emanuel Novo	(Tunisia) Alaeddine Bouslimi	(Tunisia) **Bilel Khefifi**	(Brazil) Breno (Brazil) Halef Pitbull (Egypt) **Mohamed Abdelmaguid** (Rwanda) Ally Niyonzima
Najran	(Brazil) Carlos Henrique	(Ghana) Izaka Aboudou	(Sierra Leone) **Kwame Quee**	(Tunisia) Borhen Hkimi	(Tunisia) Oussema Boughanmi	(Brazil) Rafael Costa (Tunisia) Seifeddine Jerbi
Ohod	(Algeria) Sofiane Khelili	(Bosnia and Herzegovina) **Goran Zakarić**	(Madagascar) Carolus Andria	(Morocco) Zakaria Lahlali	(Tunisia) Ouday Belhaj	(Tunisia) Mourad Hedhli

== League table ==
Pos	Team	Pld	W	D	L	GF	GA	GD	Pts	Promotion, qualification or relegation
1	Al-Khaleej (C, P)	38	18	12	8	51	36	+15	66 (Note: Al-Khaleej finished ahead of Al-Adalah on overall goal difference: Al-Khaleej +15, Al-Adalah +10 (Al-Khaleej 2–2 Al-Adalah, Al-Adalah 0–0 Al-Khaleej).)	Promotion to the Pro League
2	Al-Adalah (P)	38	18	12	8	42	32	+10	66	Promotion to the Pro League
3	Al-Wehda (P)	38	17	14	7	51	29	+22	65	Promotion to the Pro League
4	Hajer	38	18	9	11	44	31	+13	63	
5	Al-Jabalain	38	17	10	11	48	39	+9	61	
6	Ohod	38	15	14	9	51	42	+9	59	
7	Al-Qadsiah	38	14	13	11	40	32	+8	55	
8	Al-Kholood	38	14	12	12	40	36	+4	54	
9	Al-Orobah	38	13	13	12	45	44	+1	52 (Note: Al-Orobah finished ahead of Najran on head-to-head points: Al-Orobah: 4, Najran: 1 (Najran 1–2 Al-Orobah, Al-Orobah 0–0 Najran).)	
10	Najran	38	13	13	12	38	33	+5	52	
11	Al-Ain	38	11	16	11	38	41	−3	49 (Note: Bisha were awarded a 3–0 win over Al-Ain due to Al-Ain's inability to hold the fixture.)	
12	Al-Okhdood	38	12	12	14	43	44	−1	48 (Note: Al-Okhdood finished ahead of Al-Sahel and Al-Shoulla on head-to-head points: Al-Okhdood: 8 pts; Al-Sahel: 3 pts; Al-Shoulla: 3 pts. Al-Sahel finished ahead of Al-Shoulla on overall goal difference: Al-Sahel +7, Al-Shoulla +6.)	
13	Al-Sahel	38	12	12	14	50	43	+7	48	
14	Al-Shoulla	38	10	18	10	40	34	+6	48	
15	Jeddah	38	12	11	15	35	39	−4	47 (Note: Jeddah finished ahead of Al-Jeel on head-to-head points: Jeddah: 4, Al-Jeel: 1 (Jeddah 0–0 Al-Jeel, Al-Jeel 1–2 Jeddah).)	
16	Al-Jeel (R)	38	11	14	13	37	51	−14	47	Relegation to the Second Division
17	Al-Diriyah (R)	38	10	12	16	38	56	−18	42	Relegation to the Second Division
18	Al-Nahda (R)	38	8	14	16	37	52	−15	38	Relegation to the Second Division
19	Al-Kawkab (R)	38	4	15	19	30	54	−24	27	Relegation to the Second Division
20	Bisha (R)	38	5	10	23	27	57	−30	25	Relegation to the Second Division

Updated to match(es) played on 28 May 2022. Source: goalzz.com
Rules for classification: 1) Points; 2) Head-to-head points; 3) Head-to-head goal difference; 4) Total goal difference; 5) Total goals scored; 6) Fair-play points (Note: Head-to-head record is used only after all the matches between the teams in question have been played).
(C) Champions; (P) Promoted; (R) Relegated

=== Positions by round ===
The table lists the positions of teams after each week of matches. In order to preserve chronological evolvements, any postponed matches are not included in the round at which they were originally scheduled but added to the full round they were played immediately afterward.

Team ╲ Round	1	2	3	4	5	6	7	8	9	10	11	12	13	14	15	16	17	18	19	20	21	22	23	24	25	26	27	28	29	30	31	32	33	34	35	36	37	38
Al-Khaleej	7	5	2	3	2	1	1	2	2	3	3	1	1	1	1	1	1	1	1	1	1	2	1	2	1	1	1	1	1	1	1	1	1	1	1	1	1	1
Al-Adalah	4	1	1	1	1	2	2	1	1	1	2	2	2	2	2	3	3	2	2	2	2	1	2	1	2	2	2	4	4	4	3	3	3	2	2	2	2	2
Al-Wehda	2	2	4	8	3	3	3	4	6	7	4	4	6	8	6	5	5	7	7	7	5	6	6	6	6	6	6	3	3	3	2	2	2	3	4	5	4	3
Hajer	1	9	9	12	12	15	8	6	3	2	1	3	3	3	5	6	8	6	4	6	6	4	5	4	5	4	3	5	5	6	6	5	5	5	5	3	3	4
Al-Jabalain	19	18	14	15	13	5	9	7	5	5	6	10	14	13	10	13	10	9	6	4	4	5	4	5	4	5	5	2	2	2	4	4	4	4	3	4	5	5
Ohod	6	4	3	6	6	9	5	9	11	11	11	8	5	4	3	2	2	4	3	3	3	3	3	3	3	3	4	6	6	5	5	6	6	6	7	6	6	6
Al-Qadsiah	12	15	10	4	10	12	14	17	13	13	12	13	9	9	7	9	7	10	12	12	12	10	10	7	7	7	7	7	8	7	7	7	7	7	6	7	7	7
Al-Kholood	20	20	20	17	19	19	20	20	18	19	19	16	16	17	15	12	13	11	11	9	10	11	9	9	9	8	8	9	11	10	8	8	8	8	8	8	8	8
Al-Orobah	5	12	11	5	7	4	6	3	7	8	9	14	11	11	11	8	11	12	9	10	9	7	7	8	8	9	10	10	10	11	9	9	9	9	9	10	10	9
Najran	11	7	8	13	14	16	16	18	19	16	16	17	17	15	14	11	9	8	10	11	11	12	12	13	14	14	9	8	7	8	11	10	10	10	10	9	9	10
Al-Ain	14	16	19	20	18	17	17	19	20	20	20	20	19	20	20	20	20	19	19	19	19	18	18	17	17	17	18	18	16	15	17	15	16	16	15	15	12	11
Al-Okhdood	18	11	16	18	20	20	19	13	8	6	7	9	7	7	8	7	6	5	8	8	8	9	11	11	10	10	11	11	9	9	10	11	11	11	11	11	11	12
Al-Sahel	9	14	17	19	15	8	12	16	16	14	14	12	8	5	4	4	4	3	5	5	7	8	8	10	11	11	12	12	12	14	12	13	13	12	14	13	14	13
Al-Shoulla	8	13	6	2	4	6	4	5	4	4	5	5	4	6	9	10	12	13	13	14	14	14	13	12	13	13	14	13	13	12	14	14	14	14	12	14	15	14
Jeddah	17	17	15	10	9	14	13	10	12	9	8	6	10	10	12	14	15	16	17	17	15	16	17	15	12	12	13	14	14	13	15	16	15	13	13	12	13	15
Al-Jeel	10	6	7	9	8	10	10	14	17	15	15	15	15	16	18	18	17	18	15	16	17	17	15	18	18	18	16	16	15	17	13	12	12	15	16	16	16	16
Al-Diriyah	3	3	5	11	5	7	11	8	9	10	10	7	12	14	16	17	18	15	16	13	13	15	16	14	15	15	17	17	17	18	18	17	17	17	17	17	17	17
Al-Nahda	13	8	12	7	11	13	15	15	15	18	17	18	18	18	17	15	14	14	14	15	16	13	14	16	16	16	15	15	18	16	16	18	18	18	18	18	18	18
Al-Kawkab	16	19	18	14	16	11	7	11	10	12	13	11	13	12	13	16	16	17	18	18	18	19	19	19	19	19	19	19	19	19	19	19	19	19	19	19	19	19
Bisha	15	10	13	16	17	18	18	12	14	17	18	19	20	19	19	19	19	20	20	20	20	20	20	20	20	20	20	20	20	20	20	20	20	20	20	20	20	20

Leader
Promotion to the Pro League
Relegation to the Second Division

Updated to match(es) played on 28 May 2022. Source:

== Results ==
Home \ Away	ADA	AIN	DIR	JAB	JEL	KAW	KHJ	KHO	NAH	OKH	ORO	QAD	SAH	SHO	WHD	BIS	HJR	JED	NAJ	OHD
Al-Adalah		1–1	3–0	0–2	1–1	2–1	0–0	1–0	1–2	0–1	3–3	1–1	1–0	1–0	0–2	2–1	1–0	1–1	2–1	2–1
Al-Ain	2–0		0–0	1–1	2–2	2–1	1–1	0–1	1–0	1–1	3–0	1–0	1–0	1–1	1–1	2–2	0–0	1–0	1–1	1–4
Al-Diriyah	0–1	3–1		1–1	1–2	2–2	0–2	1–3	1–1	2–1	1–0	0–2	2–4	1–2	0–3	2–0	1–1	2–1	1–1	1–1
Al-Jabalain	1–2	1–0	3–2		2–2	1–0	1–2	1–1	1–2	2–2	2–1	0–0	1–0	2–1	0–0	0–1	2–0	2–1	2–0	0–3
Al-Jeel	0–2	2–3	1–0	0–2		0–0	1–5	3–2	2–1	0–1	0–2	1–0	3–6	1–0	0–0	0–0	0–0	1–2	0–3	2–2
Al-Kawkab	0–1	0–4	1–1	0–2	1–2		3–2	1–1	2–0	1–2	2–3	0–2	0–0	1–0	0–2	0–1	2–3	0–1	0–1	0–1
Al-Khaleej	2–2	1–2	2–0	0–0	1–1	3–1		1–0	5–2	3–1	1–2	1–0	1–0	0–0	1–2	1–0	2–0	1–1	2–1	1–0
Al-Kholood	1–2	2–0	0–0	3–1	2–0	0–0	1–1		2–0	3–0	1–1	1–1	3–2	1–1	0–0	1–0	1–0	0–0	3–1	1–1
Al-Nahda	0–0	1–1	2–0	1–1	0–1	2–2	2–0	1–1		1–1	2–2	1–1	0–0	1–3	0–2	2–0	1–2	2–1	0–2	3–0
Al-Okhdood	0–0	4–0	2–3	3–1	0–1	2–0	0–1	0–1	2–1		2–1	1–2	2–1	1–1	1–1	1–0	2–1	0–1	0–0	1–2
Al-Orobah	1–0	0–0	3–1	1–0	2–2	1–1	0–1	1–0	2–2	1–1		2–1	0–0	0–0	0–0	4–1	1–2	2–1	0–0	1–3
Al-Qadsiah	0–2	0–1	0–0	2–1	0–0	1–1	1–2	1–0	0–0	3–1	1–0		0–4	2–1	0–2	2–1	3–0	3–0	0–0	3–0
Al-Sahel	1–1	1–0	0–0	1–0	2–1	4–1	5–0	3–1	0–0	1–1	1–3	0–1		1–1	0–1	2–1	1–4	2–1	0–0	1–2
Al-Shoulla	0–1	1–1	4–0	0–1	0–0	1–1	0–0	3–1	0–2	1–2	1–0	1–1	1–1		2–2	2–0	1–0	2–2	2–1	1–1
Al-Wehda	0–0	1–0	1–1	1–3	0–1	1–2	1–1	2–0	3–1	2–1	5–1	1–1	3–0	0–0		1–2	1–0	2–0	0–1	3–3
Bisha	2–3	3–0	1–2	0–2	2–2	1–1	0–0	1–0	1–1	1–1	0–2	0–0	0–3	1–3	0–1		1–2	0–0	1–2	0–1
Hajer	2–0	1–1	1–2	1–2	2–0	1–1	2–0	4–0	2–0	1–0	0–0	2–0	2–1	1–0	2–0	0–0		2–1	0–0	1–1
Jeddah	0–0	2–1	1–2	0–1	0–0	0–0	0–2	1–0	2–0	0–0	1–0	0–3	2–0	0–0	2–1	4–1	0–1		1–2	1–1
Najran	2–1	1–0	0–1	3–2	2–0	1–1	0–0	0–1	2–0	2–2	1–2	2–1	0–0	0–1	1–1	3–0	0–1	0–2		1–1
Ohod	0–1	0–0	2–1	1–1	0–2	0–0	3–2	0–1	3–0	1–0	1–0	1–1	2–2	2–2	1–2	2–1	2–0	1–2	1–0	

Updated to match(es) played on 28 May 2022. Source: goalzz.com
Legend: Blue = home team win; Yellow = draw; Red = away team win.

== Statistics ==
As of 28 May 2022

=== Scoring ===
==== Top scorers ====
Rank	Player	Club	Goals
1	(Madagascar) Carolus Andria	Ohod	25
2	(Brazil) Uilliam	Al-Sahel	19
3	(Eritrea) Ahmed Abdu Jaber	Al-Wehda	18
4	(Ivory Coast) Mamadou Soro	Al-Khaleej	16
5	(Brazil) Adriano Pardal	Hajer	14
5	(Mali) Modibo Maïga	Hajer	14
5	(Brazil) Rayllan Bruno	Al-Orobah	14
8	(Brazil) Jhonnattann	Al-Sahel	12
9	(Ivory Coast) Ibrahim Diomandé	Al-Qadsiah	11
9	(Ecuador) Marlon	Al-Jabalain	11
9	(Mali) Ibrahima Tandia	Al-Adalah	11
9	(Guinea-Bissau) Piqueti	Al-Shoulla	11

==== Hat-tricks ====
Player	For	Against	Result	Date	Ref.
(Brazil) Uilliam	Al-Sahel	Al-Diriyah	4–2 (A)	30 November 2021	
(Brazil) Uilliam^{4}	Al-Sahel	Al-Jeel	6–3 (A)	14 December 2021	
(Saudi Arabia) Jassem Al-Hamdan^{4}	Al-Khaleej	Al-Jeel	5–1 (A)	18 January 2022	
(Brazil) Jhonnattann	Al-Sahel	Al-Kawkab	4–1 (H)	17 May 2022	
(Eritrea) Ahmed Abdu Jaber^{4}	Al-Wehda	Al-Orobah	5–1 (H)	23 May 2022	

Note

(H) – Home; (A) – Away
^{4} Player scored 4 goals

=== Clean sheets ===
Rank	Player	Club	Clean sheets
1	(Saudi Arabia) Mutab Sharahili	Al-Khaleej	17
2	(Saudi Arabia) Abdulquddus Atiah	Al-Wehda	16
3	(Saudi Arabia) Abduraouf Al-Daqeel	Hajer	15
4	(Saudi Arabia) Saad Al-Saleh	Al-Qadsiah	14
5	(Saudi Arabia) Abdulrahman Al-Shammari	Najran	13
6	(Portugal) Ricardo Ribeiro	Al-Jabalain	12
6	(Portugal) Emanuel Novo	Jeddah	12
8	(Saudi Arabia) Ali Al-Ameri	Al-Adalah	11
8	(Saudi Arabia) Nasser Al-Saiari	Al-Ain	11
10	(Saudi Arabia) Abdulaziz Al-Mwijed	Al-Jeel	10
10	(Saudi Arabia) Sultan Al-Ghamdi	Al-Orobah	10

== Awards ==
=== Round awards ===
Round	Player of the Round		Reference
Round	Player	Club	Reference
Round 23	(Brazil) Diego Miranda	Al-Khaleej	
Round 24	(Saudi Arabia) Sultan Al-Sawadi	Al-Wehda	
Round 25	(Egypt) Mohammad Fouad	Jeddah	
Round 26	(Saudi Arabia) Yahya Al-Najei	Al-Wehda	
Round 27	(Ivory Coast) Ibrahim Diomandé	Al-Qadsiah	
Round 28	(Tunisia) Borhen Hkimi	Najran	
Round 29	(Saudi Arabia) Ali Al-Ameri	Al-Adalah	
Round 30	(Saudi Arabia) Muaiad Al-Tolayhi	Al-Kholood	
Round 31	(Saudi Arabia) Waleed Al-Shangeati	Al-Adalah	
Round 32	(Senegal) Omar Wade	Al-Shoulla	
Round 33	(Saudi Arabia) Saleh Aboulshamat	Al-Qadsiah	
Round 34	(Mali) Modibo Maïga	Hajer	
Round 35	(Saudi Arabia) Ayman Al-Hujaili	Al-Ain	
Round 36	(Brazil) Jhonnattann	Al-Sahel	
Round 37	(Eritrea) Ahmed Abdu Jaber	Al-Wehda	
Round 38	(Brazil) Rayllan Bruno	Al-Orobah	

== See also ==
- 2021–22 Saudi Professional League
- 2021–22 Saudi Second Division
- 2021–22 Saudi Third Division
