= Ismaël Bangoura =

Guinean footballer (born 1985)

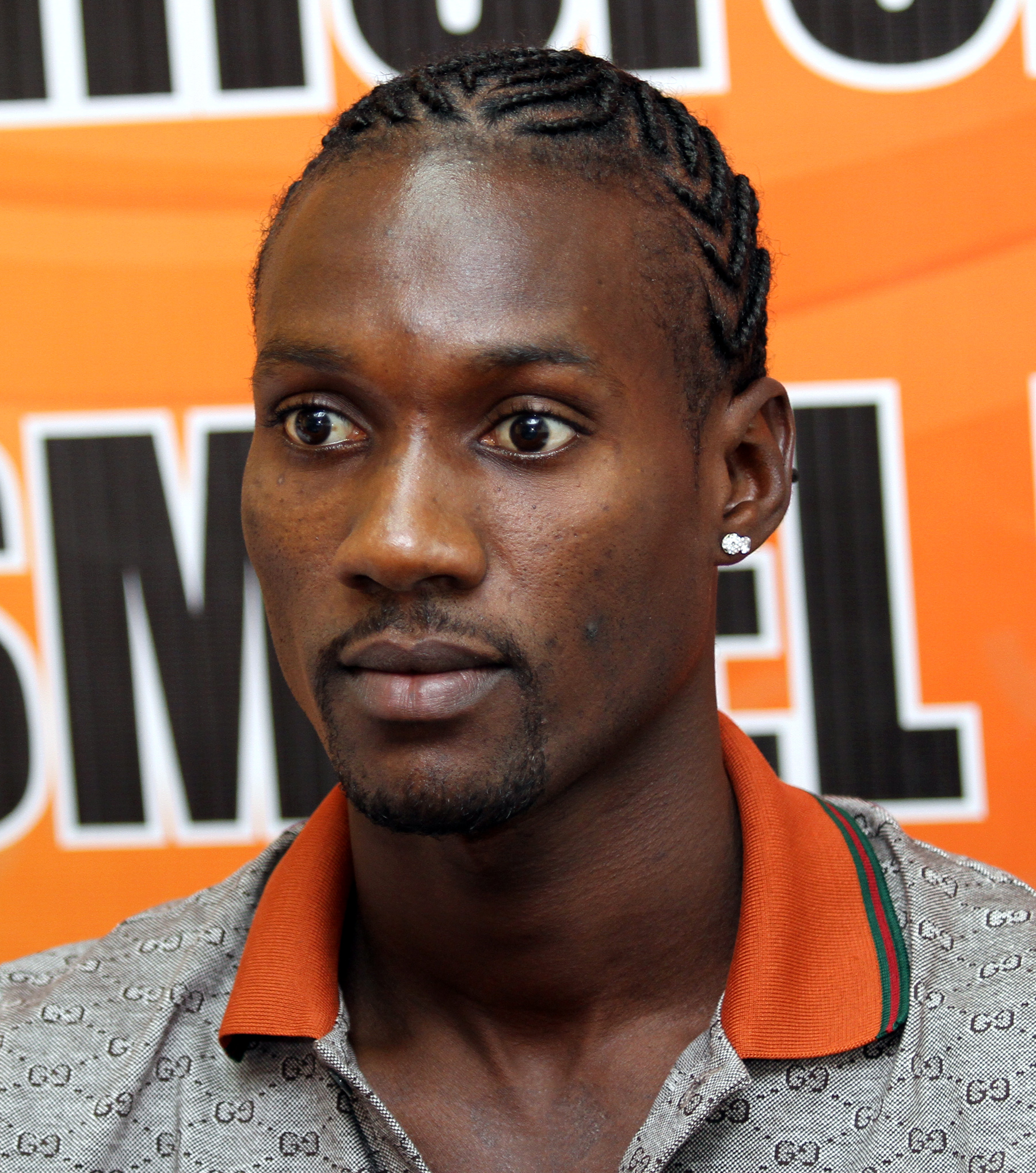
- Bangoura in 2012

Personal information
- Date of birth: 2 January 1985 (age 41)
- Place of birth: Conakry, Guinea
- Height: 1.74 m (5 ft 9 in)
- Position: Forward

Youth career
- 2000–2003: Athlético de Coléah

Senior career*
Years	Team	Apps	(Gls)
2003–2005	Gazélec Ajaccio	44	(15)
2005–2007	Le Mans	56	(18)
2007–2009	Dynamo Kyiv	46	(28)
2009–2010	Rennes	39	(8)
2010–2011	Al Nasr	18	(10)
2012–2015	Nantes	40	(4)
2012–2013	→ Umm Salal (loan)	6	(0)
2013–2014	Nantes B	12	(2)
2016–2019	Al-Raed	75	(37)
2019	→ Al-Batin (loan)	8	(0)
2019–2020	Mulhouse	9	(1)
2020–2021	Al-Taraji	22	(15)
Total		375	(138)

International career
2006–2015	Guinea	52	(13)
- * Club domestic league appearances and goals as of 19:57, 23 March 2020 (UTC)

Ismaël Bangoura (born 2 January 1985) is a Guinean former footballer who played as a forward. Although his primary position is striker, Bangoura has also played as a winger and attacking midfielder.

== Club career ==
=== Early career ===
Bangoura began his career at local side Athlético Coléah, before being spotted by scouts from French amateurs Gazélec Ajaccio. He joined the Corsican side, scoring 15 times in 44 games for his new club, before moving to French Ligue 1 side Le Mans in 2005. He made his debut on 5 November 2005 against French club Marseille, starting his top-flight career with a goal in his sides 3–0 victory. He ended his first season having played 23 times, scoring a six goals. He was the top scorer for Le Mans in the 2006–07 season, with 12 goals in 33 games as well as being the joint second highest scorer in Ligue 1.

=== Dynamo Kyiv ===
On 5 July 2007, Bangoura signed a five-year contract with Dynamo Kyiv of Ukraine. The transfer fee was estimated at around €5 million. He quickly became a fan favourite and established himself as one of the team's main goalscorers. Alongside his teammate, Senegalese defender Pape Diakhaté, he also performed goal celebrations reminiscent of African dancing.

His performances at Dynamo Kyiv gave Bangoura the opportunity to compete in European competitions. In the 2007–08 UEFA Champions League, he scored three goals in seven appearances. On 23 October 2007, he scored from approximately 25 metres against Manchester United, although Dynamo lost the match 4–2. On 11 November of the same year, he scored twice against Shakhtar Donetsk, leading his team to a 2–1 victory.

Bangoura also impressed in the 2008–09 UEFA Cup, scoring the opening goal in the second leg of Dynamo's quarter-final tie against Paris Saint-Germain, helping his team secure a 3–0 victory and advance to the semi-finals. However, Dynamo Kyiv were eliminated in the semi-finals after losing 3–2 on aggregate to Shakhtar Donetsk.

=== Stade Rennais ===
On 2 July 2009, Bangoura joined Rennes in France from Dynamo Kyiv, signing a four-year contract. The transfer fee was €11 million. On 8 August 2009, he made his debut against Boulogne, scoring in the seventh minute with a spectacular overhead kick to help his team secure a 3–0 victory.

=== Al-Nasr SC ===
On 2 September 2010, Bangoura transferred to Al-Nasr SC of the United Arab Emirates, signing a four-year contract. The transfer fee was reported to be approximately €8 million. On 16 September 2010, he scored against Al Ahli Dubai in a 3–1 victory. During the 2010–11 season, he scored 10 goals in 17 league appearances, helping Al-Nasr finish third in the league and earning recognition in Emirati football.

At the beginning of the 2011–12 season, Bangoura was expected to be away from the club for approximately two months from January 2012 due to his participation in the 2012 Africa Cup of Nations. In preparation for his absence on international duty, Al-Nasr sought a replacement and signed Brazilian forward Careca. The club decided to bring in a replacement in view of the considerable period Bangoura would spend away with his national team.

=== Nantes ===
On 31 January 2012, Bangoura signed a two-and-a-half-year contract with Nantes of Ligue 2. Al-Nasr SC subsequently filed a complaint with FIFA, alleging that Bangoura had unilaterally terminated his contract without just cause. FIFA's Dispute Resolution Chamber (DRC) ruled in favour of Al-Nasr, ordering Bangoura and Nantes to jointly pay €4.5 million in compensation. It also imposed a four-month suspension on Bangoura and banned Nantes from registering new players during two consecutive transfer windows. Bangoura, Nantes and Al-Nasr appealed to the Court of Arbitration for Sport. However, on 3 June 2013, the CAS dismissed all three appeals and upheld FIFA's original ruling.

Before FIFA's Dispute Resolution Chamber issued its ruling, Bangoura had joined Umm Salal SC of the Qatar Stars League on a one-season loan on 10 September 2012. During his time with the Qatari club, he served part of the four-month suspension imposed by FIFA.

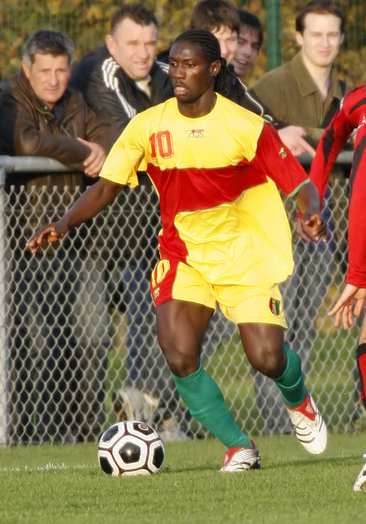
Ismaël Bangoura during Guinea national team friendly match against the Stade Rennais youth team

=== Al-Raed ===
In January 2016, he signed for Saudi Professional League club Al-Raed.

Bangoura was released by Al-Raed in July 2019.

== International career ==
Bangoura represented the Guinea national team from 2006 and participated in the 2006 Africa Cup of Nations that same year. Guinea won all three of their group-stage matches to advance to the quarter-finals, where they were eliminated after a 3–2 defeat to Senegal.

Bangoura subsequently participated in the 2008 Africa Cup of Nations, scoring against the Morocco in the group stage to help Guinea secure a 3–2 victory. In the same year, he also featured in the African qualifying campaign for the 2010 FIFA World Cup, scoring four goals across two matches against the Namibia.

In 2011, Bangoura scored against the Madagascar and the Nigeria during the 2012 Africa Cup of Nations qualification, helping Guinea qualify for the tournament.

At the 2012 Africa Cup of Nations, Bangoura was included in Guinea's squad and appeared in the group-stage matches against the Mali, the Botswana and the Ghana. Guinea defeated Botswana 6–1 and drew 1–1 with Ghana, but were eliminated in the group stage after losing their opening match 1–0 to Mali.

== Personal life ==
Bangoura holds both Guinean and French nationalities.

In October 2018 he was convicted of fraud by a French court and fined €130,000; his house was also seized.

In the end of February 2020 Ismaël gave an exclusive interview to the Ukrainian football news agency "FootballHub" with complimentary comments to several Ukrainian players and Dynamo Kyiv in general.

== Career statistics ==
=== Club ===
Appearances and goals by club, season and competition
Club	Season	League			National Cup (Note: Includes Coupe de France, Ukrainian Cup and King Cup)		League Cup (Note: Includes Coupe de la Ligue, UAE League Cup and Saudi Crown Prince Cup)		Continental (Note: Includes UEFA Champions League and UEFA Europa League)		Other		Total	
Club	Season	Division	Apps	Goals	Apps	Goals	Apps	Goals	Apps	Goals	Apps	Goals	Apps	Goals
Gazélec Ajaccio	2003–04	Championnat National	9	2			—		—				9	2
Gazélec Ajaccio	2004–05	Championnat National	35	13			—		—				35	13
Gazélec Ajaccio	Total		44	15					0	0			44	15
Le Mans	2005–06	Ligue 1	23	6	0	0	2	0	—		0	0	25	6
Le Mans	2006–07	Ligue 1	33	12	2	0	3	2	—		0	0	38	14
Le Mans	Total		56	18	2	0	5	2	0	0	0	0	63	20
Dynamo Kyiv	2007–08	Ukrainian Premier League	20	15	1	0	—		7	4	0	0	28	19
Dynamo Kyiv	2008–09	Ukrainian Premier League	26	13	0	0	—		13	6	0	0	39	19
Dynamo Kyiv	Total		46	28	1	0	0	0	20	10	0	0	67	38
Rennes	2009–10	Ligue 1	35	6	1	0	1	0	—		0	0	37	6
Rennes	2010–11	Ligue 1	4	2	0	0	0	0	—		0	0	4	2
Rennes	Total		39	8	1	0	1	0	0	0	0	0	41	8
Al Nasr	2010–11	UAE Pro League	17	10			0	0	—		0	0	17	10
Al Nasr	2011–12	UAE Pro League	1	0			3	0	—		0	0	4	0
Al Nasr	Total		18	10	0	0	3	0	0	0	0	0	21	10
Nantes	2011–12	Ligue 2	9	2	0	0	0	0	—		0	0	9	2
Nantes	2012–13	Ligue 2	3	0	0	0	0	0	—		0	0	3	0
Nantes	2013–14	Ligue 1	13	1	1	0	2	0	—		0	0	16	1
Nantes	2014–15	Ligue 1	15	1	2	0	3	2	—		0	0	20	3
Nantes	Total		40	4	3	0	5	2	0	0	0	0	48	6
Umm Salal (loan)	2012–13	Qatar Stars League	6	0	0	0	0	0	—		0	0	6	0
Nantes B	2013–14	Championnat de France Amateur	8	1	—		—		—		0	0	8	1
Nantes B	2014–15	Championnat de France Amateur	3	1	—		—		—		0	0	3	1
Nantes B	2015–16	Championnat de France Amateur	1	0	—		—		—		0	0	1	0
Nantes B	Total		12	2	0	0	0	0	0	0	0	0	12	2
Al-Raed	2015–16	Saudi Professional League	13	7	2	0	0	0	—		2 (Note: Appearance(s) in Saudi Professional League relegation play-offs)	2	17	9
Al-Raed	2016–17	Saudi Professional League	25	18	1	0	1	0	—		0	0	27	18
Al-Raed	2017–18	Saudi Professional League	25	10	0	0	1	0	—		2	1	28	11
Al-Raed	2018–19	Saudi Professional League	12	2	0	0	0	0	—		0	0	12	2
Al-Raed	Total		75	37	3	0	2	0	0	0	4	3	84	40
Al-Batin (loan)	2018–19	Saudi Professional League	8	0	0	0	0	0	—		0	0	8	0
Mulhouse	2019–20	Championnat National 2	9	1	1	0	—		—		0	0	10	1
Al-Taraji	2020–21	Saudi Second Division	22	15	—		—		—		0	0	22	15
Career total			375	138	11	0	16	4	20	10	4	3	426	155

=== International ===
Appearances and goals by national team and year
National team	Year	Apps	Goals
Guinea	2006	6	0
Guinea	2007	8	1
Guinea	2008	15	9
Guinea	2009	8	0
Guinea	2010	1	0
Guinea	2011	5	2
Guinea	2012	5	1
Guinea	2014	3	0
Guinea	2015	1	0
Total		52	13

Scores and results list Guinea's goal tally first, score column indicates score after each Bangoura goal.

List of international goals scored by Ismaël Bangoura
No.	Date	Venue	Opponent	Score	Result	Competition	Ref.
1	9 September 2007	Stade du 28 Septembre, Conakry, Guinea	Cape Verde	4–0	4–0	2008 Africa Cup of Nations qualification	
2	11 January 2008	Atalaya Park, Marbella, Spain	Sudan	6–0	6–0	Friendly	
3	24 January 2008	Ohene Djan Stadium, Accra, Ghana	Morocco	2–0	3–2	2008 Africa Cup of Nations	
4	14 June 2008	Sam Nujoma Stadium, Windhoek, Namibia	Namibia	1–0	2–1	2010 FIFA World Cup qualification	
5	22 June 2008	Stade du 28 Septembre, Conakry, Guinea	Namibia	2–0	4–0	2010 FIFA World Cup qualification	
6	22 June 2008	Stade du 28 Septembre, Conakry, Guinea	Namibia	3–0	4–0	2010 FIFA World Cup qualification	
7	22 June 2008	Stade du 28 Septembre, Conakry, Guinea	Namibia	4–0	4–0	2010 FIFA World Cup qualification	
8	20 August 2008	Stade des Bourgognes, Chantilly, France	Ivory Coast	1–1	1–2	Friendly	
9	12 October 2008	Stade du 28 Septembre, Conakry, Guinea	Kenya	1–0	3–2	2010 FIFA World Cup qualification	
10	18 November 2008	Stade Paul Cosyns, Compiègne, France	Gabon	3–3	3–3	Friendly	
11	5 June 2011	Stade du 28 Septembre, Conakry, Guinea	Madagascar	2–0	4–1	2012 Africa Cup of Nations qualification	
12	8 October 2011	Abuja National Stadium, Abuja, Nigeria	Nigeria	1–0	2–2	2012 Africa Cup of Nations qualification	
13	15 August 2012	Prince Moulay Abdellah Stadium, Rabat, Morocco	Morocco	2–0	2–1	Friendly	

== Honours ==
Dynamo Kyiv

- Ukrainian Premier League: 2008/09
- Ukrainian Super Cup: 2007
