= Nasser Al-Saiari =

Saudi Arabian footballer

Personal information
- Full name: Nasser Saleh Al-Saiari
- Date of birth: August 1, 1988 (age 38)
- Place of birth: Saudi Arabia
- Height: 1.72 m (5 ft 8 in)
- Position: Goalkeeper

Team information
- Current team: Najran
- Number: 25

Senior career*
Years	Team	Apps	(Gls)
2009–2010	Al-Akhdoud		
2010–2011	Al-Hamadah		
2011–2019	Najran	121	(0)
2019–2020	Al-Nahda		
2020–2021	Al-Jabalain	0	(0)
2021–2023	Al-Ain	44	(0)
2023–2024	Al-Shoulla	10	(0)
2024	Najran		
2024–2025	Al-Sadd		
2025–	Najran		
- * Club domestic league appearances and goals

Nasser Al-Saiari (Arabic: ناصر الصيعري; born August 1, 1988), is a Saudi Arabian professional footballer who plays for Najran as a goalkeeper.

== Career ==
On 2 October 2025, Al-Saiari joined Najran.
