= Oussama Hsini =

Tunisian footballer

Personal information
- Full name: Oussama Hsini
- Date of birth: 20 May 1993 (age 33)
- Place of birth: Tunisia
- Position: Defender

Senior career*
Years	Team	Apps	(Gls)
2015–2016	CS Sfaxien		
2014–2015	→ AS Gabès (loan)		
2015–2016	EGS Gafsa		
2016–2019	Olympique Béja		
2019–2020	Sfax Railways Sports		
2020–2021	Al Selmiyah		
2021	Kumait		
2021–2022	JS Kairouan		
2022	Stade Gabèsien		
2022–2023	Jendouba		
2023–2024	Sharurah		
- * Club domestic league appearances and goals

Oussama Hsini (born 20 May 1993) is a Tunisian footballer who plays as a defender.
