= Youssef Trabelsi =

Tunisian footballer

Personal information
- Full name: Youssef Trabelsi
- Date of birth: 18 March 1993 (age 33)
- Place of birth: Tunisia
- Position: Midfielder

Team information
- Current team: Al-Rayyan
- Number: 17

Youth career
- CA Bizertin

Senior career*
Years	Team	Apps	(Gls)
2011–2017	CA Bizertin	38	(1)
2013–2014	→ Olympique Béja (loan)	29	(1)
2017–2018	Menzel Bourguiba		
2018–2020	Stade Tunisien	31	(2)
2020–2021	Bisha	25	(5)
2021–2022	Al-Zulfi	25	(20)
2022–2023	Al-Bukiryah	30	(12)
2023–	Al-Rayyan		
- * Club domestic league appearances and goals as of 22 October 2022

Youssef Trabelsi (born 18 March 1993) is a Tunisian footballer who plays for Al-Rayyan as a midfielder.
