= Abdallah Berrabeh =

Tunisian footballer (born 1993)

Personal information
- Full name: Abdallah Aloui Berrabeh
- Date of birth: 8 August 1993 (age 33)
- Place of birth: Tunisia
- Position: Defender

Senior career*
Years	Team	Apps	(Gls)
2014–2016	US Monastir		
2016–2018	EO Sidi Bouzid		
2018–2019	Stade Sfaxien		
2019–2020	Stade Gabèsien		
2020–2021	Al-Kholood		
2021–2024	Al-Rayyan		
2025	AS Agareb		
2025–2026	Bisha		
- * Club domestic league appearances and goals

Abdallah Berrabeh (born 8 August 1993) is a Tunisian professional footballer who plays as a defender.

On 8 October 2025, Berrabeh joined Saudi Second Division club Bisha.
