= Lamjed Ameur =

Tunisian footballer

Personal information
- Full name: Lamjed Ameur
- Date of birth: 9 February 1990 (age 36)
- Place of birth: Tunisia
- Position: Forward

Team information
- Current team: Al-Hilal

Senior career*
Years	Team	Apps	(Gls)
2010–2012	AS Djerba		
2012–2014	CS Hammam-Lif		
2014	US Ben Guerdane		
2014–2015	Sfax Railways Sports		
2015–2018	AS Gabès		
2018–2019	Stade Gabèsien		
2019–2020	JS Kairouan		
2020–2021	Al-Najma		
2021	Al-Selmiyah		
2021–	Al-Hilal		
- * Club domestic league appearances and goals

Lamjed Ameur (born 9 February 1990) is a Tunisian footballer who plays for Al-Hilal as a forward.
