= Nizar Touil =

Tunisian footballer

Personal information
- Full name: Nizar Touil
- Date of birth: 11 December 1989 (age 36)
- Place of birth: Tunisia
- Position: Midfielder

Youth career
- CO Médenine
- Club Africain

Senior career*
Years	Team	Apps	(Gls)
2009–2011	Olympique du Kef		
2011–2012	EO Sidi Bouzid		
2012–2013	Grombalia Sports		
2013–2015	US Ben Guerdane		
2015–2016	AS Gabès		
2016–2018	CO Médenine		
2018–2020	Olympique Béja		
2020–2021	Al-Sharq		
2021–2022	CO Médenine		
2022	Tuwaiq		
2022–2023	SC Ben Arous		
2023	Sajer		
- * Club domestic league appearances and goals

Nizar Touil (born 11 December 1989) is a Tunisian footballer who plays as a midfielder.
