= Taylon Correa =

Brazilian footballer

Personal information
- Full name: Taylon Nicolas Correa Marcolino
- Date of birth: 16 March 1995 (age 31)
- Place of birth: Carmo de Minas, Brazil
- Height: 1.85 m (6 ft 1 in)
- Position: Forward

Team information
- Current team: St. Andrews
- Number: 7

Youth career
- 2013–2014: CA Votuporanguense
- 2014–2015: CGP Atlético Clube

Senior career*
Years	Team	Apps	(Gls)
2017–2018	Inter de Limeira		
2018–2019	Hibernians	26	(19)
2019	Botev Plovdiv	5	(0)
2019	Al Urooba		
2020	Criciúma	0	(0)
2020	Valletta	5	(0)
2020–2021	Al-Khaldiya SC		
2021–2022	Al-Okhdood	28	(18)
2022	Persita Tangerang	14	(4)
2022–2023	Burgan		
2023–2024	Jerash		
2024	Al-Shoulla		
2026	Birżebbuġa	1	(0)
2026–	St. Andrews	8	(4)
- * Club domestic league appearances and goals as of 21 April 2026

Taylon Nicolas Correa Marcolino (born 16 March 1995), or simply Taylon, is a Brazilian professional footballer who plays as a forward for Maltese Challenge League side St. Andrews.

== Career ==
On 25 June 2019, Taylon Correa signed a two-year contract with Botev Plovdiv, playing five times for the club before leaving by mutual consent on 26 August 2019.

On 18 September 2019, Taylon Correa confirmed that he had joined Al Urooba in the United Arab Emirates.

On 9 August 2023, Correa joined Jerash. On 10 September 2024, Correa joined Al-Shoulla.
