= Kaká Mendes =

Brazilian footballer (born 1993)

Personal information
- Full name: Francisco Clailson Mendes da Silva
- Date of birth: 16 March 1993 (age 33)
- Place of birth: Fortaleza, Brazil
- Height: 1.67 m (5 ft 6 in)
- Position: Attacking midfielder

Team information
- Current team: Port
- Number: 12

Senior career*
Years	Team	Apps	(Gls)
2011–2013	Tiradentes	32	(4)
2013–2014	América de Natal	0	(0)
2014–2015	Cabofriense	22	(1)
2015–2017	Boavista		
2017	Sampaio Corrêa		
2017–2020	Cabofriens	41	(1)
2018	→ Sampaio Corrêa (loan)		
2019	→ Sampaio Corrêa (loan)		
2020–2023	Al-Okhdood	97	(22)
2023–2024	Al-Safa	32	(4)
2024–2025	Al-Jabalain	31	(8)
2025–	Port	11	(2)
- * Club domestic league appearances and goals as of 28 November 2025

Francisco Clailson Mendes da Silva (born 16 March 1993) commonly known as Kaká Mendes, is a Brazilian footballer who plays for Thai League 1 club Port.

== Honours ==
Port

- Thai League Cup: 2025–26

Individual

- Thai League 1 Team of the Season: 2025–26
