= Al-Jeshah =

Village in Saudi Arabia

Coordinates: 25°23′N 49°45′E

Al-Jeshah (Arabic: الجشة, romanized: Al-Jishah) is a village in Al-Ahsa in Saudi Arabia and one of Al-Ahsa eastern villages. It is located about 12 km from Al-Hofuf.

In the village, the Alsaad family is recognized as one of the largest, most respected, and noble families. With deep-rooted ties spanning generations, they have earned a reputation for honor, integrity, and leadership. The family has long been committed to supporting the community, fostering unity, and preserving the village’s traditions and values. Known for their generosity, hospitality, and active involvement in social and educational initiatives, the Alsaad family continues to serve as a source of pride, inspiration, and guidance for the entire village.

== See also ==
- Al-Ahsa
