= Oussama Omrani =

Tunisian footballer

Personal information
- Full name: Oussama Omrani
- Date of birth: 10 March 1992 (age 34)
- Place of birth: Tunisia
- Position: Defender

Senior career*
Years	Team	Apps	(Gls)
2012–2014	LPS Tozeur		
2014–2015	ES Métlaoui		
2015	EO Sidi Bouzid		
2015–2016	LPS Tozeur		
2016–2017	CO Médenine		
2017–2019	US Tataouine		
2017	→ ES Métlaoui (loan)		
2019–2020	ES Métlaoui		
2020–2021	Al-Najma		
2021–2022	Al-Sadd		
2021–2022	US Tataouine		
2023–2024	Arar		
2024–2025	Qilwah		
- * Club domestic league appearances and goals

Oussama Omrani (born 10 March 1992) is a Tunisian footballer who plays as a defender.
