= Mehdi Bensib =

Tunisian footballer

Personal information
- Full name: Mehdi Bensib Dahmani
- Date of birth: 1 September 1994 (age 32)
- Place of birth: Tunisia
- Position: Defender

Senior career*
Years	Team	Apps	(Gls)
2014–2016	ES Sahel	1	(0)
2015	→ AS Djerba (loan)	5	(0)
2015	→ AS Kasserine (loan)	3	(0)
2016	→ CS M'saken (loan)		
2016–2019	CA Bizertin	25	(0)
2019–2020	ES Métlaoui	25	(0)
2020–2021	Al-Orobah		
2021–2022	Al-Taraji		
2022–2024	Al-Diriyah		
2024–2025	Al-Kawkab		
- * Club domestic league appearances and goals

Mehdi Bensib (born 1 September 1994) is a Tunisian footballer who plays as a defender.
