= Al-Orobah Club Stadium =

Multi-purpose stadium in Sakakah, Saudi Arabia

- Interactive map of Al-Orobah Club Stadium
- Location: Sakakah, Saudi Arabia
- Coordinates: 30°0′17.892″N 40°12′43.9056″E
- Owner: Ministry of Sport
- Operator: Al-Orobah
- Capacity: 7,000
- Surface: Grass

Construction
- Opened: 1988

Tenants
- Al-Orobah (1988–present); Al-Jandal (1988–present); Al-Entelaq

Al-Orobah Club Stadium (Arabic: ملعب نادي العروبة) is a multi-purpose stadium in Sakakah, Saudi Arabia. It is currently used mostly for football matches. It is the home stadium of Al-Orobah, The stadium is also used as a home stadium by teams from the Al-Jawf Province.
