= Kumait FC =

Saudi Arabian association football team

Kumait
- Full name: Kumait FC
- Founded: 1978
- Ground: Marat, Al-Riyadh, Saudi Arabia
- League: Saudi Third Division
Home colours	Away colours

Kumait FC is a Saudi Arabian football team in Marat City playing at the Saudi Third Division.

== Ascending to Second Division ==
He promoted to the Saudi Second Division after the decision of the Saudi Arabian Football Federation to ascend 8 clubs.

== See also ==
- List of football clubs in Saudi Arabia
