= Bisha FC =

Association football club in Saudi Arabia

Bisha
- Full name: Bisha FC
- Nickname: نادي بيشة
- Founded: 1960; 66 years ago as Al-Nakhil; 2019; 7 years ago as Bisha
- Ground: Bisha, Saudi Arabia
- Chairman: Abdulaziz Judaee
- Manager: Karim Dalhoum
- League: Second Division
- 2024-25: Saudi Second Division League 13th of 16th Group A
Home colours	Away colours

Bisha FC (formally known as Al-Nakheel), usually known simply as Bisha is a Saudi Arabian football (soccer) team in Bisha city playing at the Saudi Second Division.

== Current squad ==
As of 11 September 2024:

Note: Flags indicate national team as defined under FIFA eligibility rules; some limited exceptions apply. Players may hold more than one non-FIFA nationality.

No.	Pos.	Nation	Player
1	GK	KSA	Ahmed Al-Shehri
4	DF	KSA	Mohammed Al-Ghamdi
5	DF	KSA	Munee Al-Bishi
9	FW	KSA	Omar Al-Rowaithi
11	MF	KSA	Aiedh Al-Shahrani
12	DF	KSA	Omar Al-Ghamdi
15	MF	KSA	Abdulaziz Al-Qahtani
20	MF	KSA	Suwailem Al-Shammari

No.	Pos.	Nation	Player
21	MF	KSA	Mohammed Al-Shabawi
22	GK	KSA	Khaled Al-Ghamdi
30	MF	KSA	Raed Al-Shahrani
88	DF	KSA	Ahmed Al-Nakhli
90	DF	KSA	Abdulaziz Al-Shammari
—	GK	KSA	Abdulrahman Al-Ghamdi
—	DF	KSA	Safwan Ambadu
—	MF	KSA	Hossam Madeeni
—	MF	KSA	Saleh Al-Harthi

== See also ==
- List of football clubs in Saudi Arabia
