= Al-Okhdood Club =

Association football club in Saudi Arabia

Al-Okhdood
- Full name: Al-Okhdood Club
- Nickname: Ambassador of Najran
- Founded: 1976; 50 years ago
- Ground: Prince Hathloul bin Abdulaziz Sports City
- Capacity: 10,000
- Chairman: Sami Al Fadehl
- Head coach: Fabiano Flora
- League: Saudi First Division League
- 2025–26: Pro League, 17th of 18 (relegated)
- Website: alakhdoud.com
Home colours	Away colours

Al-Okhdood Club (Arabic: نادي الأخدود, romanized: nādī ʿukhdūdi, lit. 'Ditch') is a Saudi professional football club based in Najran, in the southern region of Saudi Arabia. Founded in 1976, the club competes in the Saudi Professional League, the first tier of Saudi football. The club have won the Saudi Second Division twice in 1992 and most recently in 2021. Besides football, the club also consists of various other departments including karate, handball, taekwondo, volleyball, water polo, basketball and cycling. The club's name alludes to the People of the Ditch mentioned in the Qur'an.

== History ==
Al-Okhdood, founded in 1976, secured promotion to the Saudi Pro League on 15 May 2023 for the first time in history, following a 2–2 draw between 5th-placed Al-Faisaly and Jeddah with three matchdays left, in which they became the 37th club in top tier of Saudi Arabia.

== Honours ==
- Saudi Second Division League (tier 3)
  - Winners (2): 1991–92, 2020–21
- Saudi Third Division (tier 4)
  - Winners (2): 2003–04, 2017–18

== Personnel ==
=== Coaching staff ===
Position	Name
Head coach	(Portugal) Fabiano Flora
Assistant coach	(Portugal) Paulo Cadete (Saudi Arabia) Khalid Al-Suwailem
Goalkeeper coach	(Saudi Arabia) Yaqub Al-Habib
Fitness coach	(Saudi Arabia) Muntasser Al-Mehdinat
Match analyst	(Portugal) Nuno Rangel
Video analyst	(Saudi Arabia) Mohammed Al-Sadran
Performance analyst	(Saudi Arabia) Yahya Al-Balushi
Doctor	(Saudi Arabia) Saad Mubarak
Physiotherapist	(Saudi Arabia) Salman Al-Kaabi
Director of football	(Saudi Arabia) Salim Al-Jahbrani
Technical Director	(Bosnia and Herzegovina) Kemal Alispahić

=== Board members ===
Office	Name
Chairman	(Saudi Arabia) Sami Hadish Al Fadel
Vice President	(Saudi Arabia) Saleh Hamad Al Maneef
Member of board	(Saudi Arabia) Ibrahim Saleh Bani Hamim (Saudi Arabia) Hassan Hamad Al-Sadran (Saudi Arabia) Saleh Suwar Al-Maqbool (Saudi Arabia) Fawaz Mahdi Al-Talili (Saudi Arabia) Mohammed Ali Al Hamilan (Saudi Arabia) Muhammad Abdullah Al Zandan (Saudi Arabia) Youssef Hussein Al-Masoud

== Players ==
As of 20 January 2026

Note: Flags indicate national team as defined under FIFA eligibility rules; some limited exceptions apply. Players may hold more than one non-FIFA nationality.

No.	Pos.	Nation	Player
1	GK	KSA	Rakan Al-Najjar
4	DF	KSA	Abdullah Hazazi
5	DF	BRA	Alex
7	FW	ESP	Agi Dambelley
9	FW	CIV	Balla Sangaré
10	MF	POR	Rui Pedro
11	MF	KSA	Mohammed Al-Jahif
12	MF	KSA	Saif Balhareth
13	DF	KSA	Ali Al-Makrami
14	FW	KSA	Saleh Al Abbas
15	MF	KSA	Nasser Al-Bishi (on loan from Al-Riyadh)
19	MF	KSA	Saud Salem
21	DF	KSA	Mohammed Abu Abd

No.	Pos.	Nation	Player
22	MF	KSA	Ahmed Al Daghrir
23	DF	KSA	Mohammed Al-Hassaniyah
24	DF	KSA	Yousef Al Zaraia
28	GK	KSA	Ali Al-Ameri
29	MF	KSA	Saif Al-Qareh
37	FW	KSA	Khaled Al-Lazam
50	DF	KSA	Nawaf Hawsawi (on loan from Al-Riyadh)
73	DF	KSA	Hassan Al-Harbi
78	DF	KSA	Faisal Al-Hadri
88	DF	KSA	Ibrahim Ashi
92	GK	KSA	Saad Al-Qarni
93	FW	GBS	Zinho Gano
96	MF	KSA	Ahmed Majrashi

== Managerial history ==
- (Saudi Arabia) Humood Al-Saiari (2006 – 2011)
- (Egypt) Shams Eldin Hamed (21 November 2012 – 1 April 2013)
- (Egypt) Eid Farag (28 August 2013 – 25 November 2013)
- (Tunisia) Selim Al Manga (25 November 2013 – 1 April 2014)
- (Tunisia) Naoufel Srarfi (11 September 2014 – 13 February 2015)
- (Saudi Arabia) Humood Al-Saiari (13 February 2015 – 1 April 2015)
- (Tunisia) Naoufel Srarfi (1 September 2016 – 1 March 2017)
- (Egypt) Bahaaeddine Qebisi (1 August 2017 – 1 May 2018)
- (Tunisia) Khaled Msakni (1 August 2018 – 21 October 2018)
- (Egypt) Osama Orabi (21 October 2018 – 1 June 2019)
- (Brazil) Luiz Antônio Zaluar (23 July 2019 – 14 October 2021)
- (Tunisia) Ridha Jeddi (15 October 2021 – 1 June 2022)
- (Portugal) Jorge Mendonça (9 July 2022 – 10 November 2023)
- (Slovakia) Martin Ševela (10 November 2023 – 17 April 2024)
- (Algeria) Noureddine Zekri (17 April 2024 – 1 June 2024)
- (Croatia) Stjepan Tomas (22 July 2024 – 19 February 2025)
- (Tunisia) Ridha Jeddi (caretaker) (19 February 2025 – 1 March 2025)
- (Portugal) Paulo Sérgio (1 March 2025 – 5 January 2026)
- (Romania) Marius Șumudică (5 January 2026 – 18 March 2026)

== See also ==
- List of football clubs in Saudi Arabia
