= 2019–20 Saudi Second Division =

Saudi Second Division
- Season: 2019–20
- Dates: 11 October 2019 – 12 September 2020
- Champions: Hajer (2nd title)
- Promoted: Hajer; Al-Diriyah; Al-Sahel; Arar
- Relegated: Al-Anwar; Al-Jubail; Al-Suqoor; Al-Dera'a
- Matches: 266
- Goals: 643 (2.42 per match)
- Top goalscorer: Mohamed Aouichi (15 goals)
- Biggest home win: Al-Kholood 4–0 Al-Anwar (13 December 2019); Hajer 4–0 Al-Suqoor (13 February 2020); Hajer 4–0 Afif (12 March 2020); Al-Rawdhah 4–0 Al-Jandal (3 September 2020)
- Biggest away win: Al-Sadd 0–5 Hajer (7 February 2020); Afif 0–5 Al-Washm (7 March 2020)
- Highest scoring: Al-Orobah 6–3 Al-Kholood (14 February 2020)
- Longest winning run: Hajer (5 matches)
- Longest unbeaten run: Al-Sahel; Hajer (23 matches)
- Longest winless run: Al-Dera'a; Al-Jubail (10 matches)
- Longest losing run: Al-Dera'a (6 matches)
- All statistics correct as of 12 September 2020.

The 2019–20 Saudi Second Division was the 44th season of the Saudi Second Division since its establishment in 1976. Fixtures were released on 5 August 2019 and the opening round of matches was played on 11 October 2019. The league season was scheduled to conclude on 10 April 2020 with the final but was postponed due to the COVID-19 pandemic in Saudi Arabia.

On 7 March 2020, the Ministry of Sports announced that all matches would be played behind closed doors until further notice. On 14 March 2020, the Ministry suspended all sports competitions indefinitely due to the COVID-19 pandemic in Saudi Arabia. On 11 June 2020, the Ministry of Sports announced the resumption of sports activities with training starting on 21 June and games starting after 4 August 2020 and played behind closed doors. On 1 July 2020, the schedule for the remaining matches was released. It was announced that the league would resume on 13 August 2020 and end on 12 September 2020.

On 12 September 2020, Hajer defeated Al-Diriyah 1–0 in the final to win their second title.

== Team changes ==
A total of 24 teams are contesting the league, including 16 sides from the 2018–19 season, 4 relegated teams from the MS League, and 4 promoted teams from the 2018–19 Third Division.

=== To Second Division ===
Promoted from the Third Division

- Al-Safa
- Al-Rawdhah
- Al-Entesar
- Al-Anwar

Relegated from MS League

- Al-Qaisumah
- Hajer
- Al-Washm
- Al-Orobah

=== From Second Division ===
Promoted to MS League

- Hetten
- Al-Bukayriyah
- Al-Thoqbah
- Al-Taqadom

Relegated to the Third Division

- Al-Hait
- Al-Muzahimiyyah
- Al-Watani
- Al-Ghazwah

== Teams ==
;Group A

Locations of teams in the 2019–20 Saudi Second Division Group A

Club	Location	Stadium
Afif	Afif	Al-Dera'a Club Stadium (Dawadmi)
Al-Akhdoud	Najran	Al Akhdoud Club Stadium
Al-Entesar	Rabigh	Al-Entesar Club Stadium
Al-Jandal	Dumat al-Jandal	Al-Oruba Club Stadium (Sakakah)
Al-Jubail	Jubail	Al-Jubail Club Stadium
Al-Rawdhah	Al-Hasa	Prince Abdullah bin Jalawi Stadium
Al-Sadd	Najaan	Al-Shoulla Club Stadium (Al-Kharj)
Al-Sahel	Qatif	Prince Saud bin Jalawi Stadium (Khobar)
Al-Suqoor	Tabuk	King Khalid Sport City Stadium
Al-Washm	Shaqra	Al-Washm Club Stadium
Hajer	Al-Hasa	Hajer Club Stadium
Wej	Ta'if	King Fahd Stadium

Group B

Locations of teams in the 2018–19 Saudi Second Division Group B

Club	Location	Stadium
Al-Anwar	Hotat Bani Tamim	Al-Anwar Club Stadium
Al-Arabi	Unaizah	Al-Najma Club Stadium
Al-Dera'a	Dawadmi	Al-Dera'a Club Stadium
Al-Diriyah	Diriyah	Prince Turki bin Abdul Aziz Stadium (Riyadh)
Al-Hejaz	Baljurashi	King Saud Sport City Stadium (Al Bahah)
Al-Kholood	Ar Rass	Al-Hazem Club Stadium
Al-Orobah	Sakakah	Al-Oruba Club Stadium
Al-Qaisumah	Hafar al-Batin	Al-Qaisumah Club Stadium
Al-Riyadh	Riyadh	Prince Turki bin Abdul Aziz Stadium
Al-Safa	Safwa City	Al-Safa Club Stadium
Al-Sharq	Ad Dilam	Al-Shoulla Club Stadium (Al-Kharj)
Arar	Arar	Prince Abdullah bin Abdulaziz bin Musa'ed Sport City Stadium

=== Foreign players ===
The number of foreign players is limited to 2 per team.

Players name in bold indicates the player is registered during the mid-season transfer window.

Club	Player 1	Player 2	Former Players
Afif	(Guinea) **Mohamed Kassory**	(Tunisia) Sabri Zaidi	(Tunisia) Hamza Ben Abda
Al Akhdoud	(Brazil) **Emerson Freitas**	(Brazil) Lecão	(Brazil) Patrick Carvalho
Al-Anwar	(Ethiopia) **Gatoch Panom**	(Senegal) Emmanuel Gomis	(Senegal) Kemekho Cissokho
Al-Arabi	(Morocco) **Yassine Lakhal**	(Tunisia) Mohamed Aouichi	(Tunisia) Slim Mezlini
Al-Dera'a	(Mali) **Mohammed Ndiaye**	(Tunisia) **Khalil Zerwi**	(Tunisia) Haythem Gloulou (Tunisia) Sameh Bouguerra
Al-Diriyah	(Tunisia) Khaldoun Mansour	(Tunisia) Mohamed Ben Ismail	
Al-Entesar	(Ivory Coast) **Lamine Sylla**	(Guinea) **Alkhaly Traoré**	(Burundi) Shassiri Nahimana (Guinea) Joël Lamah
Al-Hejaz	(Tunisia) **Marouane Ben Amor**	(Tunisia) **Rabii Hamri**	(Gabon) Henri Ndong (Nigeria) Afeez Oladipo
Al Jandal	(Lebanon) **Mohamad Kdouh**	(Sierra Leone) **Sheka Fofanah**	(Ghana) Mohamed Kassory (Mali) Samba Diallo
Al-Jubail	(Burkina Faso) **Moïse Zongo**	(Tunisia) Maher Labidi	(Tunisia) Cherif Kechrid
Al-Kholood	(Brazil) Venancio Silva	(Mali) **Souleymane Demba**	(Brazil) Manolo Godoy
Al-Orobah	(Senegal) **Mignane Diouf**	(Tunisia) **Fehmi Kacem**	(Brazil) Jefinho (Tunisia) Bilel Tborki
Al-Qaisumah	(Angola) Aneel Bkaki	(The Gambia) Mamut Saine	
Al-Rawdhah	(Brazil) **Juninho Aguiar**	(Brazil) **Robert**	(Egypt) Ibrahim Mostafa
Al-Riyadh	(Brazil) **Chrles Oliveira**	(Panama) **Sergio Moreno**	(Ivory Coast) Cedric Fein (Ghana) Abdul Aziz Yusif
Al-Sadd	(Egypt) **Abdelhamid Sami**	(Egypt) **Hamada El Ghannam**	(Egypt) Ahmed Fawzy
Al-Safa	(Tunisia) **Hamza Messaadi**	(Tunisia) **Slim Ben Belgacem**	(Bahrain) Mahmood Al-Ajmi (Brazil) Leo Alves
Al-Sahel	(Brazil) **Jone Pinto**	(Tunisia) **Maher Haddad**	(Brazil) Talisson (Tunisia) Slim Zakar
Al-Sharq	(Burkina Faso) **Issouf Ouattara**	(Tunisia) Ahmad Boussaid	(Egypt) Amr El Shahat
Al-Suqoor	(Tunisia) **Amara Ferjaoui**	(Tunisia) **Wassim Zaghdoud**	(Ghana) Frank Gyamfi
Al-Washm	(Benin) **Abdel Fadel Suanon**	(Tunisia) **Ghaith Sghaier**	(Nigeria) Godwin Aguda (Nigeria) Sunday Akinbule
Arar	(Ivory Coast) **Cedric Fein**	(Tunisia) Adel Hamani	(Brazil) Geraldo
Hajer	(Brazil) Adriano Pardal	(Brazil) Rayllan Bruno	
Wej	(Tunisia) **Alaeddine Gmach**	(Tunisia) **Aymen Ezzine**	(Ivory Coast) Koffi Adama (Mali) Lamine Traoré

== Group A ==
Table

Pos	Team	Pld	W	D	L	GF	GA	GD	Pts	Promotion, qualification or relegation
1	Hajer (P)	22	16	6	0	42	8	+34	54	Promotion to the MS League and Qualification to the Final
2	Al-Sahel (P)	22	12	10	0	31	15	+16	46	Promotion to MS League
3	Al-Akhdoud	22	11	5	6	29	20	+9	38	
4	Al-Jandal	22	10	6	6	26	26	0	36	
5	Al-Rawdhah	22	8	5	9	23	24	−1	29	
6	Wej	22	7	6	9	21	28	−7	27	
7	Al-Washm	22	7	4	11	28	24	+4	25	
8	Afif	22	6	5	11	23	36	−13	23 (Note: Positions determined by head-to-head points: Afif: 8 pts; Al-Entesar: 4 pts; Al-Sadd: 2 pts.)	
9	Al-Entesar	22	5	8	9	20	30	−10	23	
10	Al-Sadd	22	5	8	9	24	32	−8	23	
11	Al-Jubail (R)	22	4	8	10	19	26	−7	20	Relegation to the Third Division
12	Al-Suqoor (R)	22	4	3	15	16	33	−17	15	Relegation to the Third Division

Updated to match(es) played on 3 September 2020. Source: Goalzz
Rules for classification: 1) Points; 2) Head-to-Head points; 3) Head-to-Head goal difference; 4) Head-to-Head goal scored; 5) Total goal difference; 6) Total goals scored; 7) Play-off (only for deciding champion, promotion and relegation).
(P) Promoted; (R) Relegated

== Group B ==
Table

Pos	Team	Pld	W	D	L	GF	GA	GD	Pts	Promotion, qualification or relegation
1	Al-Diriyah (P)	22	10	11	1	32	20	+12	41	Promotion to the MS League and Qualification to the Final
2	Arar (P)	22	10	10	2	30	17	+13	40	Promotion to MS League
3	Al-Kholood	22	9	10	3	39	30	+9	37	
4	Al-Riyadh	22	7	9	6	25	21	+4	30	
5	Al-Safa	22	7	8	7	25	26	−1	29 (Note: Al-Safa finished ahead of Al-Hejaz on head-to-head points: Al-Hejaz 0–0 Al-Safa, Al-Safa 2–1 Al-Hejaz.)	
6	Al-Hejaz	22	8	5	9	28	33	−5	29	
7	Al-Arabi	22	8	4	10	31	29	+2	28 (Note: Al-Arabi finished ahead of Al-Qaisumah on head-to-head points: Al-Qaisumah 1–3 Al-Arabi, Al-Arabi 0–0 Al-Qaisumah.)	
8	Al-Qaisumah	22	6	10	6	24	23	+1	28	
9	Al-Sharq	22	7	6	9	27	33	−6	27	
10	Al-Orobah	22	7	5	10	29	27	+2	26	
11	Al-Anwar (R)	22	6	4	12	26	38	−12	22	Relegation to the Third Division
12	Al-Dera'a (R)	22	3	6	13	23	42	−19	15	Relegation to the Third Division

Updated to match(es) played on 4 September 2020. Source: Goalzz
Rules for classification: 1) Points; 2) Head-to-Head points; 3) Head-to-Head goal difference; 4) Head-to-Head goal scored; 5) Total goal difference; 6) Total goals scored; 7) Play-off (only for deciding champion, promotion and relegation).
(P) Promoted; (R) Relegated

== Third place play-off ==
Al-Sahel, who finished 2nd in Group A faced Arar who finished 2nd in Group B to decide the third-placed team.

11 September 2020
18:25 AST

Al-Sahel	1–1 (a.e.t.)	Arar
Al-Zahrani 56'	Report	Dhaher 42'
Penalties
Jahfali (penalty missed); Al-Khamis (penalty missed); Awagi (penalty scored)	1–4	(penalty scored) Sooqi; (penalty scored) Hamani; (penalty scored) Dhaher; (penalty scored) Al-Enezi

Prince Mohamed bin Fahd Stadium, Dammam
Referee: Fahad Al-Hothaili

== Final ==
The winners of each group played a one-legged final to decide the champion of the 2019–20 Second Division. As winners of Group A, Hajer will face Al-Diriyah, the winners of Group B. Hajer defeated Al-Diriyah to win their second title.

12 September 2020
18:25 AST

Hajer	1–0	Al-Diriyah
Pardal 11'	Report

Hajer Club Stadium, Al-Hasa
Referee: Bandar Al-Qahtani

== Statistics ==
=== Top scorers ===
As of 4 September 2020

Rank	Player	Club	Goals
1	(Tunisia) Mohamed Aouichi	Al-Arabi	15
2	(Saudi Arabia) Mohammed Al-Shammari	Al-Qaisumah	11
2	(Saudi Arabia) Salem Al-Khaibari	Al-Kholood	11
4	(Brazil) Rayllan Bruno	Hajer	10
4	(Saudi Arabia) Mohammed Majhol	Al-Hejaz	10
4	(Saudi Arabia) Abdullah Al Yahya	Al-Sadd	10
4	(Brazil) Adriano Pardal	Hajer	10
8	(Tunisia) Ahmad Boussaid	Al-Sharq	9
8	(Saudi Arabia) Abdullah Al-Qahtani	Afif	9
10	(Brazil) Patrick Carvalho	Al-Akhdoud	8
10	(Saudi Arabia) Omar Al-Ruwaili	Al-Orobah	8

=== Hat-tricks ===
Player	For	Against	Result	Date	Ref.
(Brazil) Patrick Carvalho	Al-Akhdoud	Al-Washm	3–2 (H)	15 November 2019	
(Saudi Arabia) Malek Al-Abdulmenem	Al-Kholood	Al-Arabi	3–2 (H)	17 January 2020	
(Tunisia) Mohamed Aouichi	Al-Arabi	Al-Dera'a	4–2 (H)	25 January 2020	
(Saudi Arabia) Omar Al-Ruwaili	Al-Orobah	Al-Kholood	6–3 (H)	14 February 2020	
(Brazil) Juninho Aguiar	Al-Rawdhah	Al-Jandal	4–0 (H)	3 September 2020	

== See also ==
- 2019–20 Professional League
- 2019–20 Prince Mohammad bin Salman League
