= 2018–19 Prince Mohammad bin Salman League =

Prince Mohammad bin Salman League
- Season: 2018–19
- Dates: 28 August 2018 – 15 May 2019
- Champions: Abha (1st title)
- Promoted: Abha; Damac; Al-Adalah
- Relegated: Al-Qaisumah; Hajer; Al-Washm; Al-Orobah
- Matches: 380
- Goals: 875 (2.3 per match)
- Top goalscorer: Carolus Andria (22 goals)
- Biggest home win: Al-Mujazzal 4–0 Al-Ain (10 October 2018)
- Biggest away win: Al-Qaisumah 1–5 Al-Nojoom (17 October 2018); Al-Shoulla 0–4 Al-Ansar (19 December 2018); Al-Washm 0–4 Al-Nahda (25 December 2018)
- Highest scoring: Al-Orobah 3–4 Al-Jabalain (6 May 2019)
- Longest winning run: 6 matches Al-Shoulla
- Longest unbeaten run: 21 matches Jeddah
- Longest winless run: 23 matches Al-Orobah
- Longest losing run: 8 matches Al-Orobah
- All statistics correct as of 15 May 2019.

The 2018–19 Prince Mohammad bin Salman League was the second season of the Prince Mohammad bin Salman League under its current name, and 42nd season of the Saudi First Division since its establishment in 1976. The season started on 28 August 2018 and concluded on 15 May 2019. Fixtures for the 2018–19 season were announced on 25 July 2018.

The first team to be promoted was Abha, following their 2–2 draw away to Al-Nojoom on 30 April 2019. Despite losing to Al-Qaisumah, Abha were crowned champions on 11 May 2019 following Damac's 1–1 draw with Al-Ain. The second team to be promoted was Damac, in spite of their 1–0 defeat away to Al-Tai, on 5 May 2019. The third and final team to be promoted was Al-Adalah, who were promoted on the final matchday following their 2–0 win at home against Damac on 15 May 2019.

== Overview ==
=== First Division rebranding ===
On 7 March 2018, the Saudi FF announced that the league would be increased from 16 teams to 20 teams. The competition will be known as the Prince Mohammad bin Salman League for the second season.

=== Rule changes ===
On 7 March 2018, the SAFF announced that the numbers of foreign players were increased from 3 players to 7 players. They also increased the prize money to SAR 10 million.

== Teams ==
A total of 20 teams are contesting the league, including 9 sides from the 2017–18 season, 6 promoted teams from the Second Division, the two playoff losers from the 2017–18 Pro League playoffs, and three winners from the 2017–18 relegation playoffs.

No teams were relegated from the Pro League. Due to an increase in the number of teams, the Saudi FF announced that the relegation was canceled and in its place was a relegation play-off. Both Pro League teams, Al-Raed and Ohod, won the playoffs and secured their top-flight status.

Al-Washm were promoted as the winners of the Second Division and Al-Jabalain were promoted as the runners-up. Al-Jeel defeated Al-Ansar in the third place playoffs. Both teams were promoted after the increase of teams. The 4 teams were joined by the third-placed teams of both groups, Al-Adalah and Al-Ain. Abha defeated Al-Watani in the relegation playoffs and became the only Second Division side to win their relegation playoff match.

Al-Washm and Al-Ain will play in the Prince Mohammad bin Salman League for the first time in their history. Al-Jabalain return to the MS League for the first time since the 2007–08 season. Abha return to the MS League for the first time since the 2014–15 season. Al-Ansar return to the MS League for the first time since the 2013–14 season. Al-Adalah and Al-Jeel return to the MS League after only a season's absence.

On 4 May 2018 Al-Watani became the only club to be relegated to the Second Division following their 1–0 defeat to Abha.

== Team changes ==
The following teams have changed division since the 2017–18 season.

=== To Prince Mohammad bin Salman League ===
Promoted from Second Division

- Al-Washm
- Al-Jabalain
- Al-Jeel
- Al-Ansar
- Al-Ain
- Al-Adalah
- Abha

=== From Prince Mohammad bin Salman League ===
Promoted to Pro League

- Al-Wehda
- Al-Hazem

Relegated to Second Division

- Al-Watani

== Stadia and locations ==
Locations of teams in the 2017–18 Saudi First Division

Team	Location	Stadium	Capacity
Abha	Abha	Prince Sultan bin Abdul Aziz Stadium	20,000
Al-Adalah	Al-Hasa	Prince Abdullah bin Jalawi Stadium	19,096
Al-Ain	Al-Atawilah	King Saud Sport City Stadium (Al Bahah)	10,000
Al-Ansar	Medina	Al-Ansar Club Stadium	5,000
Al-Jabalain	Ha'il	Prince Abdul Aziz bin Musa'ed Stadium	12,000
Al-Jeel	Al-Hasa	Prince Abdullah bin Jalawi Stadium	19,096
Al-Kawkab	Al-Kharj	Al-Shoulla Club Stadium	5,200
Al-Khaleej	Saihat	Prince Nayef bin Abdulaziz Stadium	10,000
Al-Mujazzal	Al-Majma'ah	Al-Majma'ah City Stadium	5,200
Al-Nahda	Dammam	Prince Fahd bin Salman Stadium	21,701
Al-Nojoom	Al-Hasa	Prince Abdullah bin Jalawi Stadium	19,096
Al-Orobah	Sakakah	Al-Oruba Club Stadium	7,000
Al-Qaisumah	Qaisumah	Al-Batin Club Stadium	6,000
Al-Shoulla	Al-Kharj	Al-Shoulla Club Stadium	5,200
Al-Tai	Ha'il	Prince Abdul Aziz bin Musa'ed Stadium	12,000
Al-Washm	Shaqra	Al-Washm Club Stadium	3,670
Damac	Khamis Mushait	Damac Club Stadium	3,556
Hajer	Al-Hasa	Prince Abdullah bin Jalawi Stadium	19,096
Jeddah	Jeddah	Reserve Stadium in King Abdullah Sports City	1,000
Najran	Najran	Prince Sultan bin Abdul Aziz Stadium	20,000

1: Najran will play at Prince Sultan bin Abdul Aziz Stadium due to the ongoing war in Yemen
2: Al-Adalah, Al-Jeel, Al-Nojoom and Hajer also use Al-Fateh Club Stadium (7,000 seats) as a home stadium.

=== Foreign players ===
The number of foreign players is limited to 7 per team.

Players name in bold indicates the player is registered during the mid-season transfer window.

Club	Player 1	Player 2	Player 3	Player 4	Player 5	Player 6	Player 7	Former Players
Abha	(Cameroon) Gilles Ngomo	(Guinea) Ibrahima Camara	(Guinea) **Ousmane Pato**	(Mali) **Souleymane Demba**	(Morocco) Marouane Fakhr	(Tunisia) Mohamed Houssem Slimène	(Tunisia) Houssem Tabboubi	(Cameroon) Cédric Tchoumbé (Guinea) Daouda Camarra
Al-Adalah	(Burundi) **Selemani Ndikumana**	(Madagascar) Carolus Andria	(Ivory Coast) Martial Yao	(Senegal) Moctar Fall	(Tunisia) Bilel Souissi	(Tunisia) Yassine Boufalgha	(Tunisia) Youssef Fouzai	(Brazil) Leo Alves
Al-Ain	(Brazil) **Bruno Silva**	(Brazil) **Diego Assis**	(Ivory Coast) **Soualio Ouattara**	(Mali) **Moctar Cissé**	(Nigeria) **Moses Ogbu**	(Oman) Faiz Al-Rushaidi	(Senegal) Abdoulaye Dieng	(Brazil) Rennan Oliveira (Ghana) Masahudu Alhassan (Nigeria) Azeez Shobola (Senegal) Sy Ass Mandaw (Tunisia) Hichem Essifi
Al-Ansar	(Democratic Republic of the Congo) Ley Matampi	(Gabon) **Dieudonné Nkoume**	(Ghana) Mohamed Awal	(Jordan) Abdallah Deeb	(Nigeria) **David Ifeanyi**	(Syria) **Abdelrazaq Al-Hussain**	—	—
Al-Jabalain	(Benin) Sedjro Counou	(Brazil) **Yuri Messias**	(Libya) Senosi Al Hadi	(Nigeria) Peter Nworah	(Spain) **Hugo López**	(Spain) **José Galán**	(Syria) Mahmoud Al-Youssef	(Nigeria) Harmony Ikande (Nigeria) Isah Eliakwu (Sierra Leone) Alfred Sankoh
Al-Jeel	(Brazil) Francisco Pereira	(Brazil) Gugu Vieira	(Brazil) José Anderson	(Brazil) Kadu Fernandes	(Brazil) Sidevaldo Pereira	(Brazil) Valdinei	(Ivory Coast) **Jean Zirignon**	(Brazil) Leandro Tanaka
Al-Kawkab	(Burkina Faso) **Mohamed Koffi**	(Ghana) **Torric Jebrin**	(Panama) Jose Fajardo	(Senegal) Emmanuel Gomis	(Senegal) Mignane Diouf	(Tunisia) Ali Ayari	(Tunisia) Chaker Rguiî	(Brazil) Rafael Donato (Tunisia) Chiheb Jebali
Al-Khaleej	(Brazil) Bernardo Souza	(Republic of the Congo) Nicolas Ondama	(Guinea) Alsény Bangoura	(Guinea) Daouda Bangoura	(Ivory Coast) Lassina Diaby	(Jordan) Abdullah Al-Zubi	(Senegal) Alioune Ndiaye	—
Al-Mujazzal	(Brazil) **Ailton Machado**	(Brazil) **Allan Machado**	(Brazil) João Paulo	(Burundi) **Shassiri Nahimana**	(Moldova) Dmitri Stajila	(Serbia) Miloš Krstić	(Trinidad and Tobago) **Nicholas Dillon**	(Brazil) David Batista (Chile) Carlos Ross (Serbia) Draško Đorđević (Trinidad and Tobago) Lester Peltier
Al-Nahda	(Guinea) Fodé Camara	(Guinea) **Yamodou Touré**	(Ivory Coast) Hortalin Zadi	(Mali) Idrissa Coulibaly	(Mali) Cheibane Traoré	(Tunisia) **Alaeddine Abbès**	(Tunisia) **Zied Ziadi**	(Burkina Faso) Michaïlou Dramé (Ivory Coast) Jean Zirignon (Mali) Abdou Traoré
Al-Nojoom	(Brazil) Gabriel Macedo	(Burkina Faso) Aboubacar Sawadogo	(Ivory Coast) Hermann Kouao	(Nigeria) Paul Onobi	—	—	—	(Jordan) Mohammad Al-Dmeiri (Zambia) Saith Sakala
Al-Orobah	(Brazil) **Eydison**	(Brazil) **Felipe Félix**	(Brazil) **Jefinho**	(Senegal) **Elhadji Ndoye**	(Senegal) **Mohamed Daf**	(Trinidad and Tobago) Daneil Cyrus	(Trinidad and Tobago) **Lester Peltier**	(Brazil) Dija Baiano (Brazil) Pedro Rosa (Burkina Faso) Ismaël Yanogo (Cameroon) Maxime Feudjou (Ivory Coast) Frank Elvis (Guinea) Ousmane Barry
Al-Qaisumah	(Algeria) **Ali Lakroum**	(Algeria) **Mohamed Hammouche**	(Algeria) **Youcef Chibane**	(Brazil) Arthur Silva	(The Gambia) Mamut Saine	(Nigeria) **Gbolahan Salami**	(Tunisia) **Montassar Khemir**	(Brazil) Diego Barboza (Croatia) Ante Hrakac (Ghana) Kofi Boakye (Mali) Souleymane Demba (Serbia) Nikola Ašćerić
Al-Shoulla	(Brazil) **Tarabai**	(Ivory Coast) Cheick Moukoro	(Ivory Coast) Sylla Daouda	(Ghana) **Emmanuel Banahene**	(Guinea-Bissau) **Piqueti**	(Togo) **Wilson Akakpo**	(Zambia) Ziyo Tembo	(Cameroon) Anye Fru (Cameroon) Julien Ebah (Republic of the Congo) Béranger Itoua (Egypt) Mahmoud Shika
Al-Tai	(Brazil) **Dudu**	(Brazil) Pitty	(Cameroon) **Christopher Mendouga**	(Guinea) **Aboubacar Sylla**	(Senegal) Mamadou Barry	(Senegal) Moussa Sarr	(Zambia) **Saith Sakala**	(Oman) Said Al-Ruzaiqi (Senegal) Bouba Sall (Senegal) Malick Sambou (Senegal) Kemo Soumare
Al-Washm	(Algeria) **Hamza Aït Ouamar**	(Republic of the Congo) Constantin Bakaki	(Egypt) **Ahmed Khaled**	(Mali) **Kafoumba Touré**	(Nigeria) **Ugonna Uzochukwu**	(Portugal) Vasco Coelho	(Tunisia) Nidhal Saïed	(Brazil) Rodolfo Mol (Ghana) Razak Nuhu (United States) Mohamed Diabagate
Damac	(Algeria) Hacène Ogbi	(Benin) Abdel Fadel Suanon	(Ivory Coast) Aubin Kouakou	(Ivory Coast) **Gbagbo Junior Magbi**	(Syria) **Ahmed Al Ahmed**	(Syria) Khaled Haj Othman	(Tunisia) Mahmoud Ben Salah	(Mali) Harouna Samake (Nigeria) Alegbe Victor (Nigeria) Christian Pyagbara
Hajer	(Brazil) **Diego Barboza**	(Brazil) Rayllan Bruno	(Iraq) Noor Sabri	(Mauritania) Alassane Diop	(Nigeria) Gege Soriola	(Poland) **Łukasz Gikiewicz**	(Senegal) Mohamed N'Doye	(Ghana) Robert Ghansah (Tunisia) Ahmed Hosni
Jeddah	(Brazil) **Felipe Nunes**	(Brazil) **Thiago Furtuoso**	(Cameroon) Oumarou Kaina	(Ivory Coast) Alain Zoe	(Ivory Coast) **Patrick Gbala**	(Niger) Ousmane Diabaté	(Nigeria) Okiemute Odah	(Republic of the Congo) Abami Giovani (Egypt) Reda El-Weshi (Ivory Coast) Gilles N'Guessan
Najran	(Cameroon) **Guy Toindouba**	(Jordan) Mohammad Zureiqat	(Nigeria) **Marco Tagbajumi**	(Nigeria) **Reuben Gabriel**	(Tunisia) Mehdi Ressaissi	(Tunisia) **Omar Zekri**	(Tunisia) Wassim Naouara	(Brazil) Esquerdinha (Brazil) Felipe Almeida (Brazil) Mosquito (Burkina Faso) Moïse Zongo (Ivory Coast) Mohamed Doumouya

== League table ==
Pos	Team	Pld	W	D	L	GF	GA	GD	Pts	Promotion, qualification or relegation
1	Abha (C, P)	38	19	12	7	52	38	+14	69	Promotion to Pro League
2	Damac (P)	38	16	16	6	52	31	+21	64	Promotion to Pro League
3	Al-Adalah (P)	38	18	9	11	49	39	+10	63	Promotion to Pro League
4	Al-Khaleej (Q)	38	15	15	8	49	39	+10	60	Qualification for the Promotion play-offs
5	Al-Jeel	38	16	9	13	52	44	+8	57 (Note: Al-Jeel finished ahead of Al-Tai on head-to-head goal difference: Al-Jeel 2–0 Al-Tai, Al-Tai 1–0 Al-Jeel.)	
6	Al-Tai	38	15	12	11	39	34	+5	57	
7	Najran	38	13	13	12	47	43	+4	52	
8	Jeddah	38	11	17	10	46	43	+3	50 (Note: Jeddah finished ahead of Al-Nojoom on overall goal difference: Jeddah +3, Al-Nojoom +2 (Jeddah 1–1 Al-Nojoom, Al-Nojoom 2–2 Jeddah).)	
9	Al-Nojoom	38	11	17	10	46	44	+2	50	
10	Al-Nahda	38	14	7	17	41	42	−1	49 (Note: Al-Nahda finished ahead of Al-Ain on overall goal difference: Al-Nahda −1, Al-Ain −2 (Al-Nahda 2–1 Al-Ain, Al-Ain 2–1 Al-Nahda).)	
11	Al-Ain	38	12	13	13	43	45	−2	49	
12	Al-Shoulla	38	13	9	16	42	46	−4	48 (Note: Head-to-head points: Al-Shoulla 13, Al-Kawkab 12, Al-Mujazzal 7, Al-Jabalain 2 (Al-Shoulla 2–1 Al-Kawkab, Al-Kawkab 3–2 Al-Shoulla, Al-Shoulla 2–0 Al-Mujazzal, Al-Mujazzal 1–2 Al-Shoulla, Al-Shoulla 0–0 Al-Jabalain, Al-Jabalain 1–3 Al-Shoulla, Al-Kawkab 2–1 Al-Mujazzal, Al-Mujazzal 2–1 Al-Kawkab, Al-Kawkab 1–0 Al-Jabalain, Al-Jabalain 1–2 Al-Kawkab, Al-Mujazzal 1–0 Al-Jabalain, Al-Jabalain 0–0 Al-Mujazzal).)	
13	Al-Kawkab	38	13	9	16	45	52	−7	48	
14	Al-Mujazzal	38	12	12	14	41	45	−4	48	
15	Al-Jabalain	38	11	15	12	35	40	−5	48	
16	Al-Ansar	38	12	11	15	39	41	−2	47 (Note: Head-to-head points: Al-Ansar 8, Al-Qaisumah 4, Hajer 3 (Al-Ansar 4–1 Al-Qaisumah, Al-Qaisumah 0–2 Al-Ansar, Al-Ansar 1–1 Hajer, Hajer 2–2 Al-Ansar, Al-Qaisumah 2–1 Hajer, Hajer 0–0 Al-Qaisumah).)	
17	Al-Qaisumah (R)	38	13	8	17	46	53	−7	47	Relegation to the Second Division
18	Hajer (R)	38	11	14	13	39	42	−3	47	Relegation to the Second Division
19	Al-Washm (R)	38	12	7	19	35	51	−16	43	Relegation to the Second Division
20	Al-Orobah (R)	38	5	11	22	37	63	−26	26	Relegation to the Second Division

Updated to match(es) played on 15 May 2019. Source: kooora.com
Rules for classification: 1) Points; 2) Head-to-head points; 3) Head-to-head goal difference; 4) Total goal difference; 5) Total goals scored; 6) Play-off (only for deciding champion, promotion and relegation).
(C) Champions; (P) Promoted; (Q) Qualified for the phase indicated; (R) Relegated

=== Positions by round ===
The table lists the positions of teams after each week of matches. In order to preserve chronological evolvements, any postponed matches are not included in the round at which they were originally scheduled but added to the full round they were played immediately afterward.

Team ╲ Round	1	2	3	4	5	6	7	8	9	10	11	12	13	14	15	16	17	18	19	20	21	22	23	24	25	26	27	28	29	30	31	32	33	34	35	36	37	38
Abha	4	12	7	11	11	8	4	3	1	1	1	1	1	1	1	1	1	1	1	2	3	2	2	1	1	1	1	1	1	1	1	1	1	1	1	1	1	1
Damac	17	11	4	5	3	1	3	4	4	5	5	3	3	5	3	3	4	5	3	3	4	4	3	3	2	2	2	2	2	2	2	2	2	2	2	2	2	2
Al-Adalah	7	5	3	3	7	11	13	16	17	12	14	11	13	8	9	6	5	2	5	4	1	1	1	2	3	3	3	3	3	3	4	3	3	4	4	3	3	3
Al-Khaleej	10	3	8	13	17	13	15	17	16	11	9	10	12	7	8	10	11	12	9	7	7	5	5	5	6	4	4	4	5	4	3	4	4	3	3	4	4	4
Al-Jeel	11	15	18	18	10	7	6	9	13	17	13	9	6	6	6	7	7	7	10	14	14	10	8	13	12	14	10	12	9	7	6	6	6	5	5	5	5	5
Al-Tai	9	13	17	16	18	14	16	11	10	14	16	16	17	15	17	11	13	14	12	13	13	14	14	12	14	13	13	9	10	8	10	10	8	7	7	6	6	6
Najran	2	2	6	10	12	9	10	6	5	7	8	8	9	12	7	9	10	10	13	11	11	12	13	11	13	7	6	6	6	6	7	5	5	6	6	7	7	7
Jeddah	3	10	5	4	4	2	1	1	2	2	2	4	4	4	2	2	2	3	2	1	2	3	4	4	4	5	5	5	4	5	5	7	7	8	8	9	8	8
Al-Nojoom	5	8	12	12	15	17	18	15	14	13	15	15	15	14	14	17	12	13	11	8	8	8	6	9	7	8	7	7	8	12	12	13	11	9	9	11	11	9
Al-Nahda	6	7	11	15	9	16	17	18	18	18	19	18	14	17	19	19	19	17	14	12	12	13	9	6	5	6	9	11	13	11	8	8	10	13	16	13	15	10
Al-Ain	1	1	1	2	2	5	9	5	7	6	6	6	7	9	12	15	15	15	16	18	18	15	16	18	17	17	17	17	16	14	13	9	9	11	12	8	9	11
Al-Shoulla	15	14	9	6	5	6	11	12	11	15	17	17	18	16	15	14	17	18	19	20	20	19	20	20	20	20	19	19	20	18	19	19	19	19	18	18	17	12
Al-Kawkab	20	20	20	20	20	20	20	20	20	20	18	19	19	18	18	18	16	16	17	15	15	16	17	16	15	15	15	14	15	16	16	17	16	16	14	15	10	13
Al-Mujazzal	13	17	19	19	19	19	18	14	15	10	11	12	10	13	11	12	14	8	7	9	9	9	7	10	8	9	8	8	11	13	15	11	14	12	11	14	12	14
Al-Jabalain	19	16	14	8	8	12	8	8	9	8	7	7	8	11	10	13	9	9	8	10	10	11	12	8	10	10	11	13	14	15	14	15	15	15	13	10	13	15
Al-Ansar	14	9	13	7	6	3	5	7	6	3	3	5	5	2	4	4	3	4	6	6	6	7	10	7	9	11	14	10	7	9	11	14	12	10	10	12	14	16
Al-Qaisumah	12	6	10	14	14	18	14	19	19	19	20	20	20	20	20	20	20	20	20	17	17	18	15	15	16	16	16	16	17	17	17	16	17	17	17	17	16	17
Hajer	8	4	2	1	1	4	2	2	3	4	4	2	2	3	5	5	6	6	4	5	5	6	11	14	11	12	12	15	12	10	9	12	13	14	15	16	18	18
Al-Washm	18	19	16	17	16	10	7	10	8	9	12	13	11	10	13	8	8	11	15	16	16	17	18	17	18	18	18	18	18	19	18	18	18	18	19	19	19	19
Al-Orobah	16	18	15	9	13	15	12	13	12	16	10	14	16	19	16	16	18	19	18	19	19	20	19	19	19	19	20	20	19	20	20	20	20	20	20	20	20	20

Leader
Promotion to 2019–20 Saudi Professional League
Qualification to promotion play-off
Relegation to 2019–20 Second Division

Updated to match(es) played on 15 May 2018. Source:

== Results ==
Home \ Away	ABH	ADA	AIN	ANS	JAB	JEL	KAW	KHJ	MUJ	NAH	NOJ	ORO	QAI	SHO	TAI	WAS	DAM	HJR	JED	NAJ
Abha		1–0	1–1	2–1	0–0	1–0	1–0	2–2	2–0	2–1	4–2	1–1	1–2	2–2	2–2	1–0	1–0	2–1	1–1	3–1
Al-Adalah	0–2		2–0	1–2	2–0	1–0	4–2	2–1	1–2	2–1	1–2	2–1	0–0	0–0	1–0	1–0	2–0	1–1	3–2	2–0
Al-Ain	0–0	1–1		1–0	3–2	1–3	3–0	1–0	3–1	2–1	0–1	0–0	0–1	3–1	0–1	2–0	0–0	1–2	2–2	1–1
Al-Ansar	0–1	2–1	2–3		1–1	3–0	1–1	0–0	1–1	2–1	1–0	2–0	4–1	0–1	0–0	0–2	1–0	1–1	0–0	0–2
Al-Jabalain	0–1	3–2	1–0	1–0		1–1	1–2	1–1	0–0	1–1	1–0	2–1	1–1	1–3	1–1	2–0	2–1	0–0	0–2	1–1
Al-Jeel	1–0	0–0	1–1	0–1	4–1		2–0	0–0	1–3	0–0	3–0	3–0	1–1	1–1	2–0	4–1	3–3	0–3	3–0	2–2
Al-Kawkab	0–2	0–1	2–1	1–0	1–0	1–2		2–2	2–1	1–2	1–1	3–1	2–1	3–2	0–2	0–1	2–2	1–1	1–2	1–2
Al-Khaleej	3–1	2–2	2–2	2–0	2–1	2–1	0–0		3–0	0–0	0–0	1–2	3–2	1–0	1–0	3–1	1–1	3–2	1–0	1–0
Al-Mujazzal	2–3	2–1	4–0	1–1	1–0	0–2	2–1	2–2		0–2	2–1	2–1	0–0	1–2	2–1	0–0	1–3	4–0	0–0	1–1
Al-Nahda	0–2	0–2	2–1	4–0	0–0	0–1	0–1	1–4	0–0		1–0	2–1	2–3	2–0	2–0	0–1	0–2	0–1	0–0	1–0
Al-Nojoom	2–2	0–0	2–2	2–1	0–0	4–1	0–0	1–1	1–1	1–3		2–1	2–1	0–0	1–1	1–0	0–1	1–1	2–2	2–2
Al-Orobah	2–0	2–2	1–1	1–0	3–4	1–2	3–2	0–0	0–2	1–3	0–1		3–2	0–0	2–2	1–2	0–2	0–1	0–0	1–1
Al-Qaisumah	3–1	1–2	2–1	0–2	0–2	2–0	1–2	1–2	2–1	4–0	1–5	3–1		2–1	0–0	1–0	2–2	2–1	2–2	1–2
Al-Shoulla	0–1	2–0	1–2	0–4	0–0	1–2	2–1	1–0	2–0	0–1	0–1	3–2	1–0		1–2	3–1	0–3	0–2	3–1	3–1
Al-Tai	1–0	0–1	1–2	0–0	0–1	1–0	3–2	2–0	3–0	0–2	1–1	1–0	1–0	1–1		2–2	1–0	1–2	2–1	1–0
Al-Washm	2–3	2–1	0–0	3–1	3–1	0–1	1–3	2–1	1–0	0–4	0–2	0–0	0–1	0–3	1–0		0–2	1–1	4–1	1–3
Damac	0–0	3–0	1–1	1–1	0–0	1–0	0–1	3–0	0–0	2–0	1–1	4–2	1–0	2–1	1–1	1–1		2–1	1–1	1–1
Hajer	2–0	0–1	1–0	2–2	0–0	2–3	0–1	0–1	2–0	0–0	2–1	1–1	0–0	1–1	1–2	0–2	1–2		0–3	1–0
Jeddah	3–3	1–1	0–1	0–1	2–1	2–0	1–1	2–0	0–0	2–1	1–1	3–1	2–0	2–0	1–1	0–0	1–2	1–1		1–0
Najran	0–0	1–3	2–0	3–1	0–1	3–2	1–1	1–1	0–2	3–1	4–2	1–0	2–0	0–0	0–1	1–0	1–1	1–1	3–1	

Updated to match(es) played on 15 May 2019. Source:
Legend: Blue = home team win; Yellow = draw; Red = away team win.

=== Season progress ===
Team ╲ Round	1	2	3	4	5	6	7	8	9	10	11	12	13	14	15	16	17	18	19	20	21	22	23	24	25	26	27	28	29	30	31	32	33	34	35	36	37	38
Abha	W	L	W	L	D	W	W	W	W	W	L	W	D	D	W	W	D	L	L	D	W	W	D	D	W	W	L	W	W	D	D	W	D	W	D	W	L	D
Al-Adalah	D	W	W	D	L	L	D	L	L	W	D	W	D	W	D	W	W	W	L	W	W	W	W	L	L	W	L	W	D	L	L	W	W	L	W	D	D	W
Al-Ain	W	W	W	D	D	L	L	W	D	W	L	D	L	L	L	L	D	D	L	L	L	W	L	D	D	W	D	D	W	W	W	W	D	D	L	W	D	L
Al-Ansar	D	W	L	W	W	W	L	L	W	W	D	D	L	W	L	D	W	D	L	D	D	L	L	W	L	L	L	W	W	D	L	L	D	W	D	L	L	D
Al-Jabalain	L	D	W	W	D	L	W	D	L	W	W	L	D	L	D	L	W	D	W	L	D	D	D	W	D	D	D	L	D	L	W	L	D	L	W	W	L	D
Al-Jeel	D	L	L	W	W	W	D	L	L	L	W	W	W	W	L	D	L	D	L	L	D	W	W	L	D	L	W	L	W	W	W	D	D	W	W	W	L	D
Al-Kawkab	L	L	L	L	L	L	L	W	W	D	W	D	D	W	D	D	W	D	L	W	L	L	L	W	W	W	L	W	L	L	D	L	W	D	W	D	W	L
Al-Khaleej	D	W	L	L	L	W	L	D	D	W	W	D	D	W	D	L	D	L	W	W	D	W	D	W	D	W	W	D	D	W	W	L	W	D	W	L	D	D
Al-Mujazzal	D	L	L	L	W	L	W	W	L	W	D	D	W	L	D	D	D	W	W	L	D	D	W	L	W	L	W	L	L	D	L	W	L	W	D	L	D	D
Al-Nahda	W	D	L	L	W	L	L	D	L	D	L	W	W	L	L	D	D	W	W	W	D	D	W	W	W	L	L	L	L	W	W	L	L	L	L	W	L	W
Al-Nojoom	W	D	L	D	L	L	D	W	D	D	D	D	D	W	D	L	W	L	W	W	W	D	D	L	W	L	W	D	L	L	D	D	D	W	D	L	D	W
Al-Orobah	L	L	W	W	L	D	W	L	D	L	W	L	L	D	W	D	L	D	L	L	D	L	D	L	L	L	D	D	D	D	L	L	L	L	L	L	L	L
Al-Qaisumah	D	W	L	L	D	L	W	L	L	L	L	L	D	L	D	W	L	W	W	W	W	W	W	L	D	W	L	L	L	L	D	W	L	L	W	D	W	D
Al-Shoulla	L	D	W	W	W	L	L	L	D	L	D	L	L	W	W	D	L	D	L	L	L	D	L	L	L	D	W	L	L	W	D	D	W	W	W	W	W	W
Al-Tai	D	L	L	W	L	W	L	W	D	L	D	L	D	W	D	W	D	L	W	D	W	L	D	W	L	D	D	W	D	W	L	D	W	W	L	W	W	W
Al-Washm	L	L	W	D	D	W	W	L	W	L	L	D	W	D	L	W	D	L	L	L	L	L	L	W	L	D	D	L	L	L	W	W	W	L	L	W	W	L
Damac	L	W	W	D	W	W	L	D	W	D	D	W	D	L	W	D	D	D	W	D	D	D	W	W	W	D	W	W	W	D	D	W	D	W	L	L	D	L
Hajer	D	W	W	W	D	D	W	D	D	D	D	W	D	L	L	D	L	W	W	L	L	L	L	L	W	D	D	L	W	W	D	L	L	L	D	D	L	W
Jeddah	W	L	W	D	W	W	W	D	D	D	D	D	D	D	W	D	D	D	W	W	D	D	D	L	D	L	L	W	W	L	L	L	D	L	D	L	W	L
Najran	W	W	L	L	L	W	D	W	W	L	D	L	D	L	W	L	D	D	L	W	D	D	D	W	L	W	W	W	D	D	D	W	L	D	L	L	W	D

Updated to match(es) played on 15 May 2019. Source:
W = Win; D = Draw; L = Lose

== Statistics ==
=== Scoring ===
==== Top scorers ====
As of 15 May 2019

Rank	Player	Club	Goals
1	(Madagascar) Carolus Andria	Al-Adalah	22
2	(Panama) José Fajardo	Al-Kawkab	18
3	(Saudi Arabia) Saleh Al Abbas	Najran	17
4	(Ivory Coast) Hermann Kouao	Al-Nojoom	15
5	(Zambia) Saith Sakala	Al-Tai	14
5	(Trinidad and Tobago) Lester Peltier	Al-Orobah	14
5	(Mali) Cheibane Traoré	Al-Nahda	14
5	(Guinea) Ousmane Pato	Abha	14
9	(Ghana) Emmanuel Banahene	Al-Shoulla	13
10	(Niger) Yousef Omar	Al-Jeel	12
10	(Saudi Arabia) Faisel Al-Jamaan	Hajer	12

==== Hat-tricks ====
Player	For	Against	Result	Date	Ref.
(Trinidad and Tobago) Lester Peltier	Al-Mujazzal	Al-Ain	4–0 (H)	10 October 2018	
(Panama) José Fajardo	Al-Kawkab	Al-Shoulla	3–2 (H)	16 October 2018	
(Zambia) Saith Sakala	Al-Nojoom	Al-Qaisumah	5–1 (A)	17 October 2018	
(Madagascar) Carolus Andria	Al-Adalah	Al-Kawkab	4–2 (H)	15 January 2019	
(Madagascar) Carolus Andria	Al-Adalah	Najran	3–1 (A)	1 May 2019	
(Saudi Arabia) Sultan Al-Shammeri	Al-Tai	Al-Kawkab	3–2 (H)	15 May 2019	

=== Clean sheets ===
As of 15 May 2019

Rank	Player	Club	Clean sheets
1	(Syria) Khaled Haj Othman	Damac	14
1	(Ivory Coast) Hortalin Zadi	Al-Nahda	14
1	(Tunisia) Bilel Souissi	Al-Adalah	14
4	(Syria) Mahmoud Al-Youssef	Al-Jabalain	13
5	(Nigeria) Okemute Odah	Jeddah	12
5	(Moldova) Dmitri Stajila	Al-Mujazzal	12
5	(Brazil) Francisco Pereira	Al-Jeel	12
8	(Iraq) Noor Sabri	Hajer	11
8	(Jordan) Abdullah Al-Zubi	Al-Khaleej	11
10	(Democratic Republic of the Congo) Ley Matampi	Al-Ansar	10

== See also ==
- 2018–19 Saudi Professional League
- 2018–19 Second Division
- 2019 King Cup
- 2018 Super Cup
