= 2018–19 Saudi Second Division =

Saudi Second Division
- Season: 2018–19
- Dates: 19 October 2018 – 13 April 2019
- Champions: Hetten (1st title)
- Promoted: Hetten; Al-Bukayriyah; Al-Thoqbah; Al-Taqadom
- Relegated: Al-Hait; Al-Ghazwah; Al-Watani; Al-Muzahimiyyah
- Matches: 266
- Goals: 681 (2.56 per match)
- Top goalscorer: Abdullah Al-Yahya (16 goals)
- Biggest home win: Al-Akhdoud 5–0 Al-Suqoor (8 February 2019); Al-Akhdoud 5–0 Al-Ghazwah (1 March 2019); Al-Jandal 5–0 Al-Sahel (29 March 2019)
- Biggest away win: Al-Riyadh 1–5 Al-Bukayriyah (28 December 2018)
- Highest scoring: Al-Muzahimiyyah 3–5 Al-Akhdoud (7 December 2018); Al-Hejaz 5–3 Al-Diriyah (8 February 2019)
- Longest winning run: 10 games Al-Thoqbah
- Longest unbeaten run: 22 games Al-Bukayriyah
- Longest winless run: 13 games Al-Riyadh
- Longest losing run: 6 games Afif
- All statistics correct as of 13 April 2019.

The 2018–19 Saudi Second Division was the 43rd season of the Saudi Second Division since its establishment in 1996. Fixtures were released on 4 September 2018 and the opening round of matches was played on 19 October 2018. The league season ended on 13 April 2019 with the final.

On 13 April 2019, Hetten defeated Al-Bukayriyah 1–0 in the final to win their first title.

== Overview ==
=== Changes ===
On 7 March 2018, the Saudi FF announced that the league would be increased from 20 teams to 24 teams, divided into 2 groups of 12 teams.

== Team changes ==
A total of 24 teams are contesting the league, including 9 sides from the 2017–18 season, 1 relegated team from the MS League, 10 promoted teams from the 2017–18 Third Division, and four winners from the 2017–18 relegation playoffs.

=== To Second Division ===
Promoted from the Third Division

- Al-Akhdoud
- Al-Dera'a
- Al-Jandal
- Al-Arabi
- Al-Sahel
- Al-Bukayriyah
- Al-Hait
- Arar
- Al-Ghazwah
- Al-Sadd
- Afif

Relegated from MS League

- Al-Watani

=== From Second Division ===
Promoted to MS League

- Al-Washm
- Al-Jabalain
- Al-Jeel
- Al-Ansar
- Al-Ain
- Al-Adalh
- Abha

Relegated to the Third Division

- Al-Badaya

== Teams ==
;Group A

Locations of teams in the 2018–19 Saudi Second Division Group A

Club	Location	Stadium
Al-Akhdoud	Najran	Prince Sultan bin Abdul Aziz Stadium
Al-Bukayriyah	Al Bukayriyah	Al-Bukayriyah Club Stadium
Al-Diriyah	Diriyah	Reserve Stadium in Prince Faisal bin Fahd Stadium (Riyadh)
Al-Ghazwah	Badr	Al-Majd Club Stadium (Yanbu)
Al-Hejaz	Baljurashi	King Saud Sport City Stadium (Al Bahah)
Al-Jandal	Dumat al-Jandal	Al-Oruba Club Stadium (Sakakah)
Al-Muzahimiyyah	Al-Muzahmiyya	Ergah Stadium
Al-Riyadh	Riyadh	Prince Turki bin Abdulaziz Stadium
Al-Sadd	Najaan	Al-Shoulla Club Stadium (Al-Kharj)
Al-Sahel	Qatif	Prince Saud bin Jalawi Stadium (Khobar)
Al-Suqoor	Tabuk	King Khalid Sport City Stadium
Al-Taqadom	Al Mithnab	Al-Najma Club Stadium (Unaizah)

1: Al-Akhdoud will play at Prince Sultan bin Abdul Aziz Stadium due to the ongoing war in Yemen

Group B

Locations of teams in the 2018–19 Saudi Second Division Group B

Club	Location	Stadium
Afif	Afif	Al-Dera'a Club Stadium (Dawadmi)
Al-Arabi	Unaizah	Al-Najma Club Stadium
Al-Dera'a	Dawadmi	Al-Dera'a Club Stadium
Al-Hait	Ha'il	Prince Abdul Aziz bin Musa'ed Stadium
Al-Jubail	Jubail	Al-Jubail Club Stadium
Al-Kholood	Ar Rass	Al-Hazem Club Stadium
Al-Sharq	Ad Dilam	Al-Shoulla Club Stadium (Al-Kharj)
Al-Thoqbah	Khobar	Prince Saud bin Jalawi Stadium
Al-Watani	Tabuk	King Khalid Sport City Stadium
Arar	Arar	Prince Abdullah bin Abdulaziz bin Musa'ed Sport City Stadium
Hetten	Samtah	King Faisal Sport City Stadium
Wej	Ta'if	King Fahd Stadium

=== Foreign players ===
The number of foreign players is limited to 2 per team.

Players name in bold indicates the player is registered during the mid-season transfer window.

Club	Player 1	Player 2	Former Players
Afif	(Egypt) Moatazbellah Hassan	(Ghana) Aboubakar Mahadi	—
Al Akhdoud	(Brazil) **Patrick Carvalho**	(Brazil) **Lecão**	(Tunisia) Aymen Souayah (Tunisia) Haythem Ben Youssef
Al-Arabi	(Nigeria) **Emmanuel Okoye**	(Tunisia) **Ahmed Hosni**	(Egypt) Mostafa Galal (Nigeria) Udoh Joshua
Al-Bukayriyah	(Egypt) Shehab El-Din Ahmed	(Tunisia) Adel Hamani	—
Al-Dera'a	(Nigeria) Musab Lukaku	(Tunisia) **Naoufel Youssefi**	(Eritrea) Sultan Azaz
Al-Diriyah	(Republic of the Congo) Oumar Toure	(Tunisia) **Khaldoun Mansour**	(Guinea) Mohammed Camara
Al-Ghazwah	(Egypt) **Mohamed Abo Sheashaa**	(Nigeria) **Omran Saeed**	—
Al-Hait	(Ghana) **Camara**	(Tunisia) Mohamed Sghaier Nasri	(Tunisia) Marouane Tritar
Al-Hejaz	(Egypt) Mostafa Kahraba	(Nigeria) Prince Nnake	—
Al-Jandal	(Ghana) Mohamed Kassory	(Mali) **Samba Diallo**	(Egypt) Islam Adel
Al-Jubail	(Ivory Coast) Koffi Adama	(Ivory Coast) **Yaya Traoré**	—
Al-Kholood	(Brazil) Venancio Silvs	(Guinea) **Aboubacar Camara**	(Brazil) Luiz Claudio
Al-Muzahimiyyah	(Brazil) **Luiz Claudio**	(Egypt) Mohamed Osama	(Egypt) Hany El Agazy
Al-Riyadh	(Nigeria) **Kazim Balimo**	—	(Ivory Coast) Cedric Fein (Nigeria) Camar Jebril
Al-Sadd	(Egypt) **Mohamed Mohsen**	(Tunisia) Amir Omrani	(Egypt) Abdelhamid Sami
Al-Sahel	(Brazil) Geraldo	(Egypt) **Amr El Shahat**	(Brazil) Marcos
Al-Sharq	(Egypt) **Mohamed Shika**	(Yemen) **Fouad Al Omaisi**	(Egypt) Mohamed Abo Sheashaa (Egypt) Wael Farrag
Al-Suqoor	(Ivory Coast) **Cedric Fein**	(Ghana) **Moussa Euller**	(Syria) Abdulqader Majarmsh (Palestine) Ahmed Jamal
Al-Taqadom	(Egypt) **Hamada El Ghannam**	(Egypt) **Ragab El Arabi**	(Brazil) Douglas da Silva (Brazil) Francesco da Silva
Al-Thoqbah	(Ghana) **Kaba Mohamad**	(Mexico) **Frederick Ogangan**	(Tunisia) Bassem Elmaneaai
Al-Watani	(Egypt) **Youssef Hassan**	(Tunisia) **Wael Chehaibi**	(Cameroon) Jean Bapidi (Cameroon) Barga Anael (Egypt) Alaa Maher
Arar	(Brazil) Fernando dos Santos	(Zimbabwe) Brian Amidu	—
Hetten	(Tunisia) **Aymen Kthiri**	(Tunisia) **Mohamed Kasdoghli**	(Tunisia) Oussama Ben Maammar
Wej	(Burkina Faso) **Issouf Ouattara**	(Cameroon) **Jean Bapidi**	(Egypt) Amr El Shahat

== Group A ==
Table

Pos	Team	Pld	W	D	L	GF	GA	GD	Pts	Promotion, qualification or relegation
1	Al-Bukayriyah (P)	22	13	9	0	37	13	+24	48	Promotion to the MS League and Qualification to the Final
2	Al-Taqadom (P)	22	13	4	5	37	24	+13	43	Promotion to MS League
3	Al-Jandal	22	12	5	5	31	16	+15	41	
4	Al-Hejaz	22	12	2	8	39	29	+10	38	
5	Al-Sadd	22	10	7	5	40	25	+15	37	
6	Al-Sahel	22	7	9	6	26	25	+1	30	
7	Al-Akhdoud	22	7	5	10	39	34	+5	26	
8	Al-Diriyah	22	7	3	12	25	37	−12	24	
9	Al-Suqoor	22	4	9	9	22	37	−15	21	
10	Al-Riyadh	22	4	8	10	21	36	−15	20	
11	Al-Muzahimiyyah (R)	22	4	5	13	22	41	−19	17	Relegation to the Third Division
12	Al-Ghazwah (R)	22	2	8	12	16	38	−22	14	Relegation to the Third Division

Updated to match(es) played on 6 April 2019. Source: Goalzz
Rules for classification: 1) Points; 2) Head-to-Head points; 3) Head-to-Head goal difference; 4) Total goal difference; 5) Total goals scored; 6) Play-off (only for deciding champion, promotion and relegation).
(P) Promoted; (R) Relegated

== Group B ==
Table

Pos	Team	Pld	W	D	L	GF	GA	GD	Pts	Promotion, qualification or relegation
1	Hetten (C, P)	22	12	6	4	38	19	+19	42	Promotion to the MS League and Qualification to the Final
2	Al-Thoqbah (P)	22	12	4	6	34	22	+12	40	Promotion to MS League
3	Al-Kholood	22	10	5	7	29	19	+10	35	
4	Wej	22	8	10	4	36	34	+2	34	
5	Al-Sharq	22	8	6	8	24	23	+1	30	
6	Al-Arabi	22	6	11	5	21	20	+1	29	
7	Al-Dera'a	22	7	6	9	23	31	−8	27	
8	Al-Jubail	22	7	5	10	30	37	−7	26	
9	Arar	22	6	7	9	21	23	−2	25 (Note: Arar finished ahead of Afif on overall goal difference: Arar −2, Afif −11 (Arar 3–1 Afif, Afif 2–0 Arar).)	
10	Afif	22	8	1	13	24	35	−11	25	
11	Al-Hait (R)	22	6	6	10	20	29	−9	24	Relegation to the Third Division
12	Al-Watani (R)	22	5	7	10	21	29	−8	22	Relegation to the Third Division

Updated to match(es) played on 5 April 2019. Source: Goalzz
Rules for classification: 1) Points; 2) Head-to-Head points; 3) Head-to-Head goal difference; 4) Total goal difference; 5) Total goals scored; 6) Play-off (only for deciding champion, promotion and relegation).
(C) Champions; (P) Promoted; (R) Relegated

== Third place play-off ==
Al-Taqadom, who finished 2nd in Group A faced Al-Thoqbah who finished 2nd in Group B to decide the third-placed team. Al-Thoqbah defeated Al-Taqadom 3–1 after extra time to finish in third place.

11 April 2019
16:00 AST

Al-Taqadom	1–3 (a.e.t.)	Al-Thoqbah
Bo Saeed 14'	Report	Al-Nakhli 41' (pen.); Hassan 107', 119'

Al-Najma Club Stadium, Unaizah
Referee: Abdulaziz Al-Shehri

== Final ==
The winners of each group will play a one-legged final to decide the champion of the 2018–19 Second Division. As winners of Group A, Al-Bukayriyah faced Hetten, the winners of Group B. The match was scheduled to be played on 12 April 2019, but was abandoned after 32 minutes due to heavy snowfall. Hetten won the match 1–0 and won their first ever Second Division title.

13 April 2019
16:00 AST

Al-Bukayriyah	0–1	Hetten
	Report	Muharraq 78'

Al-Bukayriyah Club Stadium, Al Bukayriyah
Referee: Mohammed Al-Daqash

The match was abandoned after 32 minutes due to heavy snowfall, and was resumed on 13 April 2019, 16:00, from the point of abandonment.

== Statistics ==
=== Top scorers ===
As of 6 April 2019

Rank	Player	Club	Goals
1	(Saudi Arabia) Abdullah Al Yahya	Al-Sadd	16
2	(Saudi Arabia) Abdullah Hadhereti	Al-Taqadom	14
3	(Tunisia) Amir Omrani	Al-Sadd	13
3	(Brazil) Patrick Carvalho	Al-Akhdoud	13
5	(Nigeria) Prince Nnake	Al-Hejaz	11
5	(Saudi Arabia) Sajar Al-Shammeri	Al-Jandal	11
5	(Saudi Arabia) Ali Al-Enezi	Al-Suqoor	11
8	(Brazil) Geraldo	Al-Sahel	10
8	(Guinea) Mohamed Kassola	Al-Jandal	10
8	(Ivory Coast) Koffi Adama	Al-Jubail	10

=== Hat-tricks ===
Player	For	Against	Result	Date	Ref.
(Saudi Arabia) Mohammed Al-Harbi	Al-Taqadom	Al-Ghazwah	4–1 (A)	19 October 2018	
(Brazil) Geraldo	Al-Sahel	Al-Hejaz	4–2 (H)	27 October 2018	
(Saudi Arabia) Abdullah Al Huwail	Al-Arabi	Afif	4–1 (H)	16 November 2018	
(Saudi Arabia) Saud Salawati	Wej	Al-Watani	4–3 (H)	16 November 2018	
(Saudi Arabia) Saud Salawati	Wej	Arar	3–1 (A)	23 November 2018	
(Saudi Arabia) Abdullah Al-Yahya^{4}	Al-Sadd	Al-Diriyah	4–1 (A)	30 November 2018	
(Tunisia) Amir Omrani	Al-Sadd	Al-Suqoor	5–1 (H)	6 December 2018	
(Saudi Arabia) Ammar Belal	Al-Kholood	Afif	3–0 (A)	7 December 2018	
(Ivory Coast) Koffi Adama^{4}	Al-Jubail	Al-Hait	4–0 (H)	28 December 2018	
(Saudi Arabia) Abdullah Al-Yahya	Al-Sadd	Al-Taqadom	3–1 (A)	8 February 2019	
(Brazil) Patrick Carvalho	Al-Akhdoud	Al-Suqoor	5–0 (H)	8 February 2019	
(Saudi Arabia) Hani Al-Ghamdi	Al-Hejaz	Al-Diriyah	5–3 (H)	8 February 2019	
(Egypt) Mohamed Shika	Al-Sharq	Al-Dera'a	4–0 (H)	9 February 2019	
(Brazil) Patrick Carvalho	Al-Akhdoud	Al-Muzahimiyyah	5–1 (H)	15 March 2019	
(Guinea) Mohamed Kassory	Al-Jandal	Al-Sahel	5–0 (H)	29 March 2019	
(Saudi Arabia) Abdullah Al-Yahya	Al-Sadd	Al-Akhdoud	4–1 (H)	6 April 2019	

Note

(H) – Home; (A) – Away
^{4} Player scored 4 goals

== See also ==
- 2018–19 Professional League
- 2018–19 Prince Mohammad bin Salman League
- 2019 King Cup
- 2018 Super Cup
