= 2025–26 Al-Riyadh SC season =

Al-Riyadh
2025–26 season
- President: Bandar Al-Muqail
- Manager: Javier Calleja
- Stadium: Prince Faisal bin Fahd Stadium
- Pro League: 15th
- King Cup: Round of 16

The 2025–26 season was Al-Riyadh's 73rd year in existence and their 26th non-consecutive season in the Pro League. The club participated in the Pro League and the King's Cup.

The season covered the period from 1 July 2025 to 30 June 2026.

== Players ==
=== Squad information ===
As of 12 September 2025

Note: Flags indicate national team as defined under FIFA eligibility rules; some limited exceptions apply. Players may hold more than one non-FIFA nationality.

No.	Pos.	Nation	Player
2	DF	KSA	Yazeed Al-Bakr
5	DF	FRA	Yoann Barbet
6	MF	KSA	Saud Zidan
7	MF	KSA	Mohammed Al-Aqel
10	MF	KSA	Nawaf Al-Abed
11	MF	IRQ	Ibrahim Bayesh
13	FW	BFA	Mohamed Konaté
15	MF	KSA	Nasser Al-Bishi
16	MF	KSA	Talal Al-Shubili
20	MF	POR	Tozé
23	DF	KSA	Saud Tombakti
24	FW	KSA	Rayan Al-Bloushi
25	DF	KSA	Suwailem Al-Menhali
27	DF	KSA	Hussain Al-Nowaiqi

No.	Pos.	Nation	Player
28	MF	KSA	Bader Al-Mutairi
29	DF	KSA	Ahmed Assiri
32	MF	ARG	Luca Ian Ramírez
33	GK	KSA	Abdulmalik Al-Khaibari
40	GK	KSA	Abdulrahman Al-Shammari
50	DF	KSA	Nawaf Hawsawi
66	DF	KSA	Majed Al-Qahtani
82	GK	CAN	Milan Borjan
87	DF	KSA	Marzouq Tombakti
88	MF	KSA	Yahya Al-Shehri
90	FW	KSA	Thamer Al-Dhafiri
—	GK	KSA	Abdulaziz Al-Awairdhi
—	MF	KSA	Mohammed Sahlouli

== Transfers and loans ==
=== Transfers in ===
Entry date	Position	No.	Player	From club	Fee	Ref.
30 June 2025	GK	–	(Saudi Arabia) Abdulaziz Al-Awairdhi	(Saudi Arabia) Al-Qadsiah	End of loan	
30 June 2025	MF	15	(Saudi Arabia) Nasser Al-Bishi	(Saudi Arabia) Al-Najma	End of loan	
30 June 2025	MF	16	(Saudi Arabia) Mohammed Sahlouli	(Saudi Arabia) Al-Jabalain	End of loan	
1 July 2025	DF	7	(Saudi Arabia) Osama Al-Bawardi	(Saudi Arabia) Al-Najma	Free	
1 July 2025	DF	12	(Saudi Arabia) Sulaiman Hazazi	(Saudi Arabia) Al-Zulfi	Free	
1 July 2025	DF	23	(Saudi Arabia) Mohammed Al-Khaibari	(Saudi Arabia) Al-Khaleej	Free	
1 July 2025	MF	–	(Saudi Arabia) Maher Al-Mutairi	(Saudi Arabia) Al-Zulfi	Free	
2 July 2025	DF	36	(Saudi Arabia) Sultan Al-Essa	(Saudi Arabia) Al-Hazem	Free	
2 July 2025	MF	79	(Saudi Arabia) Fahad Al-Jizani	(Saudi Arabia) Jeddah	Free	
16 July 2025	MF	30	(Saudi Arabia) Salman Matar	(Saudi Arabia) Hajer	Free	
17 July 2025	MF	–	(England) Samuel Sackey	Free agent	Free	
22 July 2025	DF	4	(Spain) Sergio González	(Spain) Leganés	Free	
31 July 2025	DF	13	(Morocco) Ahmed Khatir	(Belgium) Beveren	$467,000	
7 August 2025	MF	10	(France) Teddy Okou	(Switzerland) Luzern	Undisclosed	
9 August 2025	DF	21	(Yemen) Abdulaziz Al-Asbahi	(United Arab Emirates) Shabab Al Ahli	Free	
13 August 2025	MF	11	(Saudi Arabia) Khalil Al-Absi	(Saudi Arabia) Al-Jabalain	Free	
18 August 2025	MF	19	(Ivory Coast) Ismaila Soro	(Israel) Beitar Jerusalem	Free	
23 August 2025	FW	9	(Senegal) Mamadou Sylla	(Spain) Real Valladolid	Free	
27 August 2025	DF	2	(Saudi Arabia) Mohammed Al-Saeed	(Saudi Arabia) Al-Okhdood	Free	
27 August 2025	MF	18	(Yemen) Khaled Al-Asbahi	(United Arab Emirates) Shabab Al Ahli	Free	
4 September 2025	DF	45	(Saudi Arabia) Essam Bahri	(Saudi Arabia) Abha	Free	
4 September 2025	MF	24	(Saudi Arabia) Hussain Al-Raqwani	(Saudi Arabia) Abha	Free	
8 September 2025	GK	28	(Slovenia) Jan Petek	(Slovenia) Aluminij	Free	
28 September 2025	GK	97	(Saudi Arabia) Emad Fida	(Saudi Arabia) Al-Ahli	Free	
18 October 2025	DF	17	(Saudi Arabia) Abdullah Hassoun	(Saudi Arabia) Al-Qadsiah	Free	

=== Loans in ===
Start date	End date	Position	No.	Player	From club	Fee	Ref.
27 August 2025	End of season	DF	33	(Saudi Arabia) Ammar Al-Harfi	(Saudi Arabia) Al-Ula	None	
10 September 2025	7 January 2026	MF	98	(Saudi Arabia) Farhah Al-Shamrani	(Saudi Arabia) Al-Ittihad	None	
10 September 2025	7 January 2026	FW	90	(Saudi Arabia) Talal Haji	(Saudi Arabia) Al-Ittihad	None	
20 January 2026	End of season	DF	80	(Saudi Arabia) Abdulelah Al-Khaibari	(Saudi Arabia) Al-Ahli	None	
24 January 2026	End of season	MF	98	(Romania) Enes Sali	(United States) FC Dallas	None	

=== Transfers out ===
Exit date	Position	No.	Player	To club	Fee	Ref.
30 June 2025	MF	99	(Romania) Enes Sali	(United States) FC Dallas	End of loan	
30 June 2025	FW	85	(Saudi Arabia) Talal Haji	(Saudi Arabia) Al-Ittihad	End of loan	
1 July 2025	MF	17	(Comoros) Faïz Selemani	Qatar SC	Free	
1 July 2025	FW	77	(France) Sekou Lega	(United Arab Emirates) Kalba	Free	
8 July 2025	FW	13	(Burkina Faso) Mohamed Konaté	(Russia) Akhmat Grozny	Free	
9 July 2025	DF	–	(Chile) Enzo Roco	(Turkey) Fatih Karagümrük	Free	
22 July 2025	DF	8	(Saudi Arabia) Abdulelah Al-Khaibari	(Saudi Arabia) Al-Ahli	$3,465,000	
3 August 2025	DF	2	(Saudi Arabia) Yazeed Al-Bakr	(Saudi Arabia) Al-Zulfi	Free	
4 August 2025	DF	29	(Saudi Arabia) Ahmed Assiri	(Saudi Arabia) Al-Khaleej	Free	
6 August 2025	MF	7	(Saudi Arabia) Mohammed Al-Aqel	(Saudi Arabia) Al-Taawoun	Free	
14 August 2025	MF	21	(Brazil) Lucas Kal	(Brazil) Sport Recife	Free	
20 August 2025	GK	–	(Saudi Arabia) Abdulaziz Al-Awairdhi	(Saudi Arabia) Al-Shabab	Free	
20 August 2025	MF	43	(Ghana) Bernard Mensah	(United Arab Emirates) Al-Nasr	Free	
20 August 2025	MF	–	(Saudi Arabia) Maher Al-Mutairi	(Saudi Arabia) Al-Zulfi	Free	
3 September 2025	MF	28	(Saudi Arabia) Badr Al-Mutairi	(Saudi Arabia) Abha	Free	
10 September 2025	DF	27	(Saudi Arabia) Hussain Al-Nowaiqi	(Saudi Arabia) Al-Jabalain	Free	
11 September 2025	GK	1	(Scotland) Vincent Angelini	(Norway) FK Jerv	Free	

=== Loans out ===
Start date	End date	Position	No.	Player	To club	Fee	Ref.
29 August 2025	End of season	DF	50	(Saudi Arabia) Nawaf Hawsawi	(Saudi Arabia) Al-Najma	None	
3 September 2025	End of season	DF	25	(Saudi Arabia) Suwailem Al-Menhali	(Saudi Arabia) Abha	None	
3 September 2025	End of season	MF	–	(Saudi Arabia) Fahad Al-Jizani	(Saudi Arabia) Abha	None	
12 September 2025	End of season	FW	24	(Saudi Arabia) Rayan Al-Bloushi	(Saudi Arabia) Al-Jabalain	None	

== Pre-season and friendlies ==
21 July 2025 Friendly	Al-Riyadh (Saudi Arabia)	0–1	(Malaysia) Johor Darul Ta'zim	La Nucia, Spain
19:00 CEST			Figueiredo 10'	Stadium: Estadi Olímpic Camilo Cano

25 July 2025 Friendly	Al-Riyadh (Saudi Arabia)	1–1	(Qatar) Al-Arabi	Benidorm, Spain
19:00 CEST		Report	Al-Naimat	Stadium: Meliá Villaitana Football Center

30 July 2025 Friendly	Al-Riyadh (Saudi Arabia)	0–2	(Spain) Castellón	Alzira, Spain
19:00 CEST			Calatrava 5'; Bosilj 39'	Stadium: Estadio Luis Suñer Picó

3 August 2025 Friendly	Al-Riyadh (Saudi Arabia)	2–5	(Spain) Ibiza	Benidorm, Spain
10:00 CEST		Report	Señé 14'; Vico 18'; El Ftouhi 35'; Gallar 50' (pen.); Bebé 57'	Stadium: Meliá Villaitana Football Center

6 August 2025 Friendly	Al-Riyadh (Saudi Arabia)	0–0	(Spain) Intercity	Benidorm, Spain
18:00 CEST		Report		Stadium: Meliá Villaitana Football Center

6 August 2025 Friendly	Al-Riyadh (Saudi Arabia)	0–0	(Spain) La Nucía	Benidorm, Spain
20:00 CEST		Report		Stadium: Meliá Villaitana Football Center

15 August 2025 Friendly	Al-Riyadh (Saudi Arabia)	2–4	(Saudi Arabia) Al-Ahli	Jeddah, Saudi Arabia
20:00 AST	Bayesh; Ramírez	Report	Toney; Majrashi; Fallatah; Aboulshamat	Stadium: Prince Mohammed bin Abdullah Al Faisal Stadium

21 August 2025 Friendly	Al-Riyadh (Saudi Arabia)	2–2	(Saudi Arabia) Al-Shabab	Riyadh, Saudi Arabia
19:25 AST	Bayesh; Okou		Hamdallah; Camara	Stadium: Al-Shabab Club Stadium

== Competitions ==
=== Overview ===
Competition	Record							
Competition	Pld	W	D	L	GF	GA	GD	Win %
Pro League	18	2	6	10	18	38	−20	11.11
King's Cup	2	1	0	1	1	2	−1	50.00
Total	20	3	6	11	19	40	−21	15.00

Updated to match played 28 January 2026
Source: Competitions

=== Pro League ===
==== League table ====
Pos	Team	Pld	W	D	L	GF	GA	GD	Pts	Qualification or relegation
13	Al-Shabab	34	8	11	15	44	57	−13	35	
14	Al-Kholood	34	9	6	19	39	61	−22	33	
15	Al-Riyadh	34	7	9	18	35	63	−28	30	
16	Damac (R)	34	6	11	17	32	55	−23	29	Relegation to FD League
17	Al-Okhdood (R)	34	5	5	24	27	70	−43	20	Relegation to FD League

Source: SPL
Rules for classification: 1) Points; 2) Head-to-head points; 3) Head-to-head goal difference; 4) Total goal difference; 5) Total goals scored; 6) Fair-play points
(Note: Head-to-head record is used only after all the matches between the teams in question have been played).
(R) Relegated

==== Results summary ====
Overall								Home						Away					
Pld	W	D	L	GF	GA	GD	Pts	W	D	L	GF	GA	GD	W	D	L	GF	GA	GD
18	2	6	10	18	38	−20	12	2	3	4	10	14	−4	0	3	6	8	24	−16

Last updated: 28 January 2026.
Source: Saudi Pro League

==== Results by round ====
Round	1	2	3	4	5	6	7	8	9	11	12	13	14	15	16	17	18	19	20	21	22	23	10	24	25	26	27	28	29	30	31	32	33	34
Ground	A	H	A	H	A	H	A	H	A	H	H	A	H	A	H	A	H	A	H	A	H	A	A	H	A	H	H	A	A	H	A	H	A	H
Result	L	W	L	L	L	W	D	D	L	L	L	L	D	L	L	D	D	D																
Position	15	9	13	13	14	13	12	12	14	15	16	16	15	16	16	16	16	15																

Updated to match(es) played on 30 January 2026. Source: Saudi Pro League
A = Away; H = Home; W = Win; D = Draw; L = Loss

==== Matches ====
All times are local, AST (UTC+3).

Win Draw Loss Postponed

29 August 2025 1	Al-Hilal	2–0	Al-Riyadh	Riyadh
18:50	Al-Harbi 22'; Malcom 45+3'	Report	Okou (yellow card) 45+1'	Stadium: Kingdom Arena; Attendance: 21,901; Referee: Majed Al-Shamrani

14 September 2025 2	Al-Riyadh	2–1	Al-Najma	Riyadh
18:35	Tozé 1'; Sylla 19'; Zidan (yellow card) 83'; Bayesh (yellow card) 86' (yellow-red card) 90+2'	Report	K. Al-Shammari (yellow card) 37'; Lázaro 51'; A. Al-Shammeri (yellow card) 55'; Al-Abdulrazzaq (yellow card) 72'	Stadium: Al-Shabab Club Stadium; Attendance: 1,151; Referee: Mohammed Al-Ismail

20 September 2025 3	Al-Nassr	5–1	Al-Riyadh	Riyadh
21:00	Félix 6', 49'; Coman 30'; Ronaldo 33', 76'; Mané (yellow card) 45+1'; Martinez (yellow card) 54'	Report	Sylla 51'	Stadium: Al-Awwal Park; Attendance: 16,174; Referee: Urs Schnyder (Switzerland)

27 September 2025 4	Al-Riyadh	2–3	Neom	Riyadh
18:20	Al-Absi 19'; Sylla (yellow card) 21'; Okou (yellow card) 63'; Doucouré 77' (o.g.)	Report	Rodríguez 2'; Hegazi (yellow card) 21', (goal) 28'; Abdi (yellow card) 38'; Lacazette 54'	Stadium: SHG Arena; Attendance: 1,038; Referee: Fraih Al-Jaloud

19 October 2025 5	Al-Khaleej	4–1	Al-Riyadh	Dammam
17:45	King 7', 25', 56'; Al-Khabrani (yellow card) 38'; Masouras 66'; Hawsawi (yellow card) 70'	Report	Sylla 45+1'; Soro (yellow card) 61'; Al-Khaibari (yellow card) 90+5'	Stadium: Prince Mohamed bin Fahd Stadium; Attendance: 1,884; Referee: Ahmed Al-Rumaikhani

23 October 2025 6	Al-Riyadh	1–0	Al-Kholood	Riyadh
17:55	Sylla 26'; Al-Khaibari (yellow card) 76'	Report	N'Doram (yellow card) 34'	Stadium: SHG Arena; Attendance: 1,316; Referee: Abdullah Zarban

30 October 2025 7	Al-Ahli	1–1	Al-Riyadh	Jeddah
20:30	Toney 90+1' (pen.); Mendy (yellow card) 90+9'; Al-Johani (red card) 90+12'; Aboulshamat (yellow card) 90+17'	Report	Sahlouli (yellow card) 19'; González (yellow card) 87'; Tombakti (yellow card) 88'; Tozé 90+11' (pen.)	Stadium: Prince Abdullah Al-Faisal Sports City Stadium; Attendance: 8,549; Referee: Rade Obrenovič (Slovenia)

6 November 2025 8	Al-Riyadh	1–1	Damac	Riyadh
20:30	Al-Bawardi (yellow card) 3'; González 24'; Sahlouli (yellow card) 74'; Al-Harfi (yellow card) 77'	Report	Sylla (yellow card) 59'; Rabea (yellow card) 60'; Al-Anazi (yellow card) 77'; Vada 85' (pen.)	Stadium: SHG Arena; Attendance: 550; Referee: Abdullah Al-Kharboush

21 November 2025 9	Al-Ittihad	2–1	Al-Riyadh	Jeddah
16:45	Benzema 24'; Al-Khaibari 42' (o.g.); Diaby (red card) 73'	Report	Sylla 77'; Borjan (yellow card) 90+6'	Stadium: Prince Abdullah Al-Faisal Sports City Stadium; Attendance: 13,447; Referee: Shukri Al-Hanfoush

25 December 2025 11	Al-Riyadh	0–2	Al-Ettifaq	Riyadh
20:30	Bayesh (yellow card) 44'; Al-Khaibari (red card) 51'	Report	Hendry (yellow card) 41'; Calvo 90'; Wijnaldum 90+5'	Stadium: Prince Faisal bin Fahd Sports City Stadium; Attendance: 891; Referee: Mohammed Al-Ismail

29 December 2025 12	Al-Riyadh	1–2	Al-Hazem	Riyadh
20:30	Sylla (yellow card) 13', (goal) 54'; Okou (yellow card) 74'	Report	Eisa (yellow card) 8'; Al-Habshi 31'; Tunkar (yellow card) 34'; Al Somah 50'; Boutouil (yellow card) 69'; Varela (yellow card) 90+1'; Sayoud (yellow card) 90+4'	Stadium: Prince Faisal bin Fahd Sports City Stadium; Attendance: 1,044; Referee: Abdullah Al-Harbi

4 January 2026 13	Al-Qadsiah	4–0	Al-Riyadh	Dammam
20:30	Quiñones 1'; Nández 11'; Al-Shahrani (yellow card) 45+1'; Retegui 51' (pen.); Álvarez (yellow card) 66'; Al-Ammar (yellow card) 85', (goal) 90+1'	Report		Stadium: Prince Mohamed bin Fahd Stadium; Attendance: 6,160; Referee: Shukri Al-Hanfoush

10 January 2026 14	Al-Riyadh	1–1	Al-Fayha	Riyadh
18:00	Hassoun (yellow card) 9'; Tozé (yellow card) 19'; Bayesh (yellow card) 87'; Barbet 90+7', (yellow card) 90+9'	Report	Villanueva 26'; Dahal (yellow card) 49'; Benzia (yellow card) 73'; Vrontis (yellow card) 77'	Stadium: Al-Awwal Park; Attendance: 329; Referee: Abdullah Zarban

13 January 2026 15	Al-Fateh	3–1	Al-Riyadh	Al-Hasa
20:30	Delgado 11', 50', (yellow card) 52'; Al-Jari (yellow card) 41'; Batna 62'; Al-Hamad (yellow card) 74'	Report	Bayesh (yellow card) 22'; Tozé 80'; Al-Khaibari (yellow card) 90+1'	Stadium: Maydan Tamweel Aloula; Attendance: 9,104; Referee: Abdullah Al-Harbi

18 January 2026 16	Al-Riyadh	1–3	Al-Taawoun	Riyadh
20:30	Al-Harfi (yellow card) 17'; Haroun (yellow card) 21'; Tozé 63'	Report	Martínez 10', 45+8' (pen.), 66'; Al-Mufarrij (yellow card) 23' (yellow-red card) 41'; Al-Ahmed (yellow card) 30'; Hugo (yellow card) 34'; Al-Qahtani (yellow card) 90+8'	Stadium: Prince Faisal bin Fahd Sports City Stadium; Attendance: 592; Referee: Khalid Al-Turais

21 January 2026 17	Al-Okhdood	2–2	Al-Riyadh	Najran
18:30	Al-Rubaie (yellow card) 25', (goal) 62', 86'; Petros (yellow card) 28'; Nguen (yellow card) 45+2' (yellow-red card) 47'; Pedroza (yellow card) 71'	Report	Al-Khaibari (yellow card) 8'; Al-Bawardi (yellow card) 19'; Tozé 26'; Al-Siyahi (yellow card) 56'; Haroun 90+5'	Stadium: Prince Hathloul bin Abdulaziz Sports City; Attendance: 2,284; Referee: Abdulsamad Bakri

25 January 2026 18	Al-Riyadh	1–1	Al-Hilal	Riyadh
20:30	Bayesh 58'; Tombakti (yellow card) 78' (yellow-red card) 90+1'; Okou (yellow card) 89'	Report	Leonardo 26', (yellow card) 49'; Marí (yellow card) 30'	Stadium: Prince Faisal bin Fahd Sports City Stadium; Attendance: 4,480; Referee: Jesús Valenzuela (Venezuela)

28 January 2026 19	Al-Najma	1–1	Al-Riyadh	Buraidah
18:20	A. Hawsawi (yellow card) 38'; Tijanić 51'	Report	Haroun 20'	Stadium: King Abdullah Sports City; Attendance: 933; Referee: Sultan Al-Harbi

20 December 2025 10	Al-Shabab	v	Al-Riyadh	Riyadh
16:15				Stadium: SHG Arena

=== King's Cup ===
All times are local, AST (UTC+3).

24 September 2025 Round of 32	Al-Jubail	0–1	Al-Riyadh	Qatif
18:10	Al-Nakhli (yellow card) 83'	Report	Tambakti (yellow card) 20'; Al-Shehri 25'; Bayesh (yellow card) 51'	Stadium: Prince Nayef bin Abdul Aziz Sports City Stadium; Referee: Raed Al-Zahrani

27 October 2025 Round of 16	Al-Fateh	2–0	Al-Riyadh	Al-Hasa
17:35	Bendebka (yellow card) 50'; Batna 63'; Al-Zubaidi 74'; Al-Sahihi (yellow card) 90+8'	Report	Okou (yellow card) 47'; González (yellow card) 52'; Barbet (yellow card) 66'; Sylla (yellow card) 71'	Stadium: Maydan Tamweel Aloula; Attendance: 3,134; Referee: Abdullah Al-Kharboush

== Statistics ==
=== Appearances ===
Last updated on 28 January 2026.

No.	Pos	Nat	Player	Total		Pro League		King's Cup	
No.	Pos	Nat	Player	Apps	Goals	Apps	Goals	Apps	Goals
Goalkeepers
22	GK	(Saudi Arabia) KSA	Abdulrahman Al-Shammari	1	0	0	0	0+1	0
28	GK	(Slovenia) SLO	Jan Petek	0	0	0	0	0	0
82	GK	(Canada) CAN	Milan Borjan	20	0	18	0	2	0
Defenders
2	DF	(Saudi Arabia) KSA	Mohammed Al-Saeed	2	0	2	0	0	0
4	DF	(Spain) ESP	Sergio González	11	1	9	1	1+1	0
5	DF	(France) FRA	Yoann Barbet	20	1	18	1	2	0
7	DF	(Saudi Arabia) KSA	Osama Al-Bawardi	19	0	11+6	0	2	0
12	DF	(Saudi Arabia) KSA	Sulaiman Hazazi	16	0	10+4	0	2	0
17	DF	(Saudi Arabia) KSA	Abdullah Hassoun	9	0	6+3	0	0	0
23	DF	(Saudi Arabia) KSA	Mohammed Al-Khaibari	15	0	12+1	0	2	0
33	DF	(Saudi Arabia) KSA	Ammar Al-Harfi	15	0	8+7	0	0	0
35	DF	(Saudi Arabia) KSA	Ahmed Al-Siyahi	3	0	3	0	0	0
44	DF	(Saudi Arabia) KSA	Saud Tambakti	4	0	1+2	0	1	0
45	DF	(Saudi Arabia) KSA	Essam Bahri	2	0	0+2	0	0	0
80	DF	(Saudi Arabia) KSA	Abdulelah Al-Khaibari	1	0	0+1	0	0	0
87	DF	(Saudi Arabia) KSA	Marzouq Tambakti	6	0	5	0	1	0
Midfielders
6	MF	(Saudi Arabia) KSA	Saud Zidan	3	0	0+3	0	0	0
8	MF	(Iraq) IRQ	Ibrahim Bayesh	13	1	11+1	1	1	0
10	MF	(France) FRA	Teddy Okou	18	0	13+3	0	1+1	0
11	MF	(Saudi Arabia) KSA	Khalil Al-Absi	15	1	5+8	1	1+1	0
14	MF	(Saudi Arabia) KSA	Talal Al-Shubili	4	0	0+3	0	1	0
15	MF	(Saudi Arabia) KSA	Nasser Al-Bishi	6	0	2+4	0	0	0
16	MF	(Saudi Arabia) KSA	Mohammed Sahlouli	11	0	6+4	0	0+1	0
18	MF	(Yemen) YEM	Khaled Al-Asbahi	8	0	0+6	0	0+2	0
19	MF	(Ivory Coast) CIV	Ismaila Soro	18	0	15+1	0	0+2	0
20	MF	(Portugal) POR	Tozé	20	5	18	5	2	0
88	MF	(Saudi Arabia) KSA	Yahya Al-Shehri	12	1	3+8	0	1	1
98	MF	(Romania) ROU	Enes Sali	2	0	1+1	0	0	0
Forwards
9	FW	(Senegal) SEN	Mamadou Sylla	20	6	16+2	6	2	0
32	FW	(Argentina) ARG	Luca Ramirez	4	0	1+3	0	0	0
99	FW	(Sudan) SDN	Sultan Haroun	6	2	2+4	2	0	0
Players sent out on loan this season
24	FW	(Saudi Arabia) KSA	Rayan Al-Bloushi	0	0	0	0	0	0
Player who made an appearance this season but have left the club
90	FW	(Saudi Arabia) KSA	Talal Haji	5	0	2+3	0	0	0
98	MF	(Saudi Arabia) KSA	Farhah Al-Shamrani	1	0	0	0	0+1	0

=== Goalscorers ===
Rank	No.	Pos	Nat	Name	Pro League	King's Cup	Total
1	9	FW	(Senegal)	Mamadou Sylla	6	0	6
2	20	MF	(Portugal)	Tozé	5	0	5
3	99	FW	(Sudan)	Sultan Haroun	2	0	2
4	4	DF	(Spain)	Sergio González	1	0	1
4	5	DF	(France)	Yoann Barbet	1	0	1
4	8	MF	(Iraq)	Ibrahim Bayesh	1	0	1
4	11	MF	(Saudi Arabia)	Khalil Al-Absi	1	0	1
4	88	MF	(Saudi Arabia)	Yahya Al-Shehri	0	1	1
Own goal					1	0	1
Total					18	1	19

Last Updated: 28 January 2026

=== Assists ===
Rank	No.	Pos	Nat	Name	Pro League	King's Cup	Total
1	20	MF	(Portugal)	Tozé	4	0	4
2	10	MF	(France)	Teddy Okou	3	0	3
3	19	MF	(Ivory Coast)	Ismaila Soro	2	0	2
3	88	MF	(Saudi Arabia)	Yahya Al-Shehri	2	0	2
5	5	DF	(France)	Yoann Barbet	1	0	1
5	9	FW	(Senegal)	Mamadou Sylla	1	0	1
5	33	DF	(Saudi Arabia)	Ammar Al-Harfi	1	0	1
Total					14	0	14

Last Updated: 28 January 2026

=== Clean sheets ===
Rank	No.	Pos	Nat	Name	Pro League	King's Cup	Total
1	82	GK	(Canada)	Milan Borjan	1	1	2
Total					1	1	2

Last Updated: 23 October 2025
