= Hamad Al-Hamad =

Saudi Arabian footballer

Personal information
- Full name: Hamad Muhanna Al-Hamad
- Date of birth: August 26, 1987 (age 39)
- Place of birth: Saudi Arabia
- Height: 1.66 m (5 ft 5 1/2 in)
- Position: Winger

Youth career
- 2005–2007: Ettifaq

Senior career*
Years	Team	Apps	(Gls)
2007–2014	Ettifaq	92	(14)
2011	→ Al-Taawon (loan)	9	(1)
2014–2016	Al-Hilal	11	(0)
2015–2016	→ Al-Raed (loan)	15	(2)
2016–2017	Al-Fateh	10	(0)
2018–2019	Al-Safa	15	(3)
2019–2021	Hajer	45	(5)
2021–2022	Al-Thoqbah		
2022–2023	Al-Jubail		

International career
2012	Saudi Arabia	3	(1)
- * Club domestic league appearances and goals as of 1 June 2019

Hamad Al-Hamad (Arabic: حمد الحمد; born 26 August 1987) is a Saudi Arabian professional footballer who currently plays as a winger. He is a former Saudi Arabia international having made his debut in 2012.

== Career ==
Al-Hamad began his career at Ettifaq and made his debut in the 2008–09 season. On 7 February 2011, Al-Hamad joined Al-Taawoun until the end of the season. Upon his return to Al-Ettifaq, Al-Hamad was made a starter by new manager Branko Ivanković. He helped his side reach the final of the 2011–12 Crown Prince Cup and finish fourth in the Pro League. This meant that they had qualified for the 2013 AFC Champions League group stages. He also made nine appearances and scored once as Al-Ettifaq reached the semi-finals of the 2012 AFC Cup. On 7 April 2014, in the last round of the 2013–14 Pro League, Al-Ettifaq were relegated to the Saudi First Division for the first time in history following a 2–1 defeat to Al-Ahli.

Following Al-Ettifaq's relegation, Al-Hamad joined Al-Hilal on a five-year contract for a reported fee of 6 million SAR. After failing to make an impact with Al-Hilal, Al-Hamad was loaned out to Al-Raed on 21 August 2015. On 16 August 2016, Al-Hamad was released by Al-Hilal. On 7 November 2016, Al-Hamad joined Al-Fateh on a one-year contract. His contract was not renewed at the end of the season and he was released by the club.

After a year without a club, Al-Hamad joined fourth-tier side Al-Safa. He helped the side gain promotion to the Saudi Second Division and win the Saudi Third Division title. On 21 August 2019, Al-Hamad joined Second Division side Hajer. He made 21 appearances and scored four times as Hajer won the Second Division title and gained promotion to the MS League.

== Career statistics ==
=== Club ===
As of match played 31 May 2021

Club	Season	League		King Cup		Crown Prince Cup		Asia		Other		Total	
Club	Season	Apps	Goals	Apps	Goals	Apps	Goals	Apps	Goals	Apps	Goals	Apps	Goals
Al-Ettifaq	2008–09	11	2	1	0	2	0	2	1	—		16	3
Al-Ettifaq	2009–10	13	1	—		1	0	—		3 (Note: Appearances in Gulf Club Champions Cup)	2	17	3
Al-Ettifaq	2010–11	9	0	0	0	0	0	—		—		9	0
Al-Ettifaq	2011–12	23	7	2	1	3	1	10	1	—		38	10
Al-Ettifaq	2012–13	13	1	2	1	0	0	3	0	—		18	2
Al-Ettifaq	2013–14	23	3	4	0	2	2	—		—		29	5
Al-Ettifaq	Total	92	14	9	2	8	3	15	2	3	2	127	23
Al-Taawoun (loan)	2010–11	9	1	—		0	0	—		—		9	1
Al-Hilal	2014–15	11	0	2	0	1	0	2	0	—		16	0
Al-Raed (loan)	2015–16	15	2	3	0	0	0	—		2 (Note: Appearances in Pro League relegation play-offs)	0	20	2
Al-Fateh	2016–17	10	0	1	0	0	0	7	0	—		18	0
Al-Safa	2018–19	15	3	3	0	—		—		—		18	3
Hajer	2019–20	21	4	0	0	—		—		—		21	4
Hajer	2020–21	24	1	—		—		—		—		24	1
Hajer	Total	45	5	0	0	0	0	0	0	0	0	45	5
Career totals		197	25	18	2	9	3	24	2	5	2	253	34

== Honours ==
Al-Hilal

- King Cup: 2015

Al-Safa

- Saudi Third Division: 2018–19

Hajer

- Saudi Second Division: 2019–20
