= Majed Abo Malihah =

Saudi Arabian footballer

Personal information
- Full name: Majed Mohammed Bakhit Abo Malihah
- Date of birth: July 1, 1984 (age 42)
- Place of birth: Saudi Arabia
- Height: 1.85 m (6 ft 1 in)
- Position: Goalkeeper

Team information
- Current team: Al-Hait
- Number: 22

Youth career
- 1997–2001: Al-Ahli
- 2002–2004: Al-Ittihad

Senior career*
Years	Team	Apps	(Gls)
2004–2005	Al-Nakhil		
2005–2011	Ohud		
2011–2012	Al-Badaya		
2012–2013	Al-Orobah		
2013–2014	Najran		
2014–2015	Al Jabalain		
2015–2016	Al-Nojoom		
2016–2018	Al-Ain		
2018–2019	Qilwah		
2019–2020	Al-Rawdhah		
2020	Al-Omran		
2022	Al-Suqoor		
2022–2024	Ras Tanura		
2024–2025	Al-Qurayat		
2025–	Al-Hait		
- * Club domestic league appearances and goals

Majed Abo Malihah (Arabic:ماجد أبو مليحة; born 1 July 1984) is a Saudi football player who currently plays for Al-Hait as a goalkeeper for Al-Omran.
