= Kouao =

Kouao is a Irovian surname. Notable people with the auename include:

- Hermann Kouao (born 1989), Ivorian footballer
- Koffi Kouao (born 1998), Ivorian footballer
- Marie Thérèse Kouao, Ivorian murderer
