= Marcelle Soulage =

French pianist, music critic and composer

Marcelle Fanny Henriette Soulage (12 December 1894 – 17 December 1970) (sometimes published under the name of Marc Sauval) was a French pianist, music critic and composer.

== Career ==
Marcelle Soulage was born in Lima, Peru, to French parents. Her father was a mining engineer and had been appointed Professor of Mineralogical Chemistry in Lima. The family returned to Paris when Marcelle was four-and-a-half years old. She began piano lessons at the age of five, and subsequently entered the Conservatoire de Paris studying with Georges Caussade, Paul Vidal, Vincent d'Indy and Nadia Boulanger. Soulage served as professor of piano and harmony at the Conservatoire d'Orléans (1921–1925) and professor of solfege at the Conservatoire de Paris (1949–1965).

Soulage composed orchestral works, chamber music and songs, sometimes writing under the pseudonym Marc Sauval. Her Suite for violin, viola and piano won the Prix Lépaulle in 1918, and Cello Sonata the Prix des Amis de la Musique in 1920.

Soulage's music is published by: Evette & Schaeffer; Buffet-Crampon; Max Eschig; Rouart, Lerolle & Cie; L. Philippo.

She died in Paris, France.

== Selected works ==
Orchestral

- Valse (1911); composed under the pseudonym Marc Sauval
- Menuet (1918); composed under the pseudonym Marc Sauval
- Danse cosaque, Op. 77 (1927)
- Invocation à la nuit et danse orientale (1928)
- Badinages (1931)

Chamber music

- 3 Pièces brèves for flute (or violin, or cello, or oboe) and piano, Op. 9

1. Danse
2. Berceuse
3. Scherzo

- Légende for flute, oboe and harp, Op. 13 (1917)
- Suite in C minor for violin, viola and piano (1918)
- Pastorale for oboe (or English horn) and harp (or piano), Op. 15 (1918)
- Fantaisie concertante for cornet and piano, Op. 19
- Sonata for viola and piano, Op. 25 (1919)
- Sonata in F♯ minor for cello and piano, Op. 31 (1919)
- Piano Trio in A minor, Op. 34 (1922)
- Sonata in G major for flute and piano, Op. 35
- Sonata in D minor violin and piano, Op. 36 (1920)
- Sonata for viola solo, Op. 43 (1921)
- String Quartet in C minor (1922)
- Piano Quartet (1925)
- Prélude et danse fantasque for cornet and piano (or orchestra), Op. 80 (published 1930)
- Les Premiers Ensembles, 6 Pièces progressives for violin and piano (1931)
- Rêverie et danse exotique for double bass and piano (or orchestra) (published 1954); composed for the Concours du Conservatoire national de musique de Paris
- Fantaisie hébraïque "Yis-roël" for viola and piano
- Sonate pastorale for flute and bassoon

Harp

- Pièce in C♯ minor for 2 harps (1916)
- Petites pièces for harp (1916)

1. Choral in A minor
2. Danse in C minor

- Barcarolle for harp, Op. 17

Keyboard

- Variations sur une chanson populaire L'avocat for piano (1918)
- Suite de danses anciennes for piano (or harp, or piano 4-hands), Op. 32
- Improvisation sur un thème de Vincent d'Indy for piano, Op. 41
- 30 Petits préludes dans tous les tons (sans octaves; d'assez facile à moyenne force) for piano, Op. 45 (1922)
- 4 Pièces enfantines for piano, Op. 45 (1922); extracts from 30 Petits préludes dans tous les tons, Op. 45
- Sur la grande route des soldats chantent. Fantaisie sur la chanson populaire "Auprès de ma blonde"(1923)
- 2 Pièces caractéristiques for piano (pour petites mains), Op. 78 (published 1927)

1. Jean qui pleure
2. Jean qui rit

- Dialogues: Ronde villageoise for harpsichord (1939)
- Pages choisies d'hier et d'aujourd'hui: 34 Pièces de difficulté progressive, classées et doigtées for piano (published 1955)

Vocal

- Berceuse d'Armorique for voice and piano (1912); words by Anatole Le Braz
- Babillarde! À une aronde! (Hirondelle) for mezzo-soprano and piano (1917); words by Jean-Antoine de Baïf
- Ballade: Cette fille, elle est morte! for baritone and piano (1917); words by Paul Fort
- De plaines en plaines for soprano and piano (1917); words by Robert de Souza
- Dormez-vous? for baritone and piano (1917); words extracted from Dominical (1892) by Max Elskamp
- D'un vanneur de blé aux vents! for tenor and piano (1917); words by Joachim du Bellay
- Il est en moi des pensées! for baritone and piano (1917); words by Carlos Larronde
- Nocturne for mezzo-soprano and piano (1917); words by Jean Moréas
- Mélodies for voice and piano, Op. 12 (1917)

1. Cantilène de la pluie; words by Auguste Gaud
2. Pâle et lente; words by André Rivoire

- Yver, vous n'estes qu'un villain (Hiver, vous n'êtes qu'un vilain) for voice and piano, Op. 14 (1920); words by Charles d'Orléans
- Chant maternel, Mélodie for voice and piano (1922); words by Jules Grisez-Droz; composed under the pseudonym Marc Sauval
- Au balcon des mélancolies for voice and piano, Op. 20; words by Jean Hytier
- Dessus le quai (d'après une chanson populaire) for voice and piano, Op. 24; words by Jean Hytier
- Laissez-moi mourir lentement for voice and piano, Op. 27 (1922); words by Pierre Aguétant
- Sur la rivière noire for medium voice and piano, Op. 28 (1923); words by Raymond Philippon
- Rendez-vous dans le parc for female voice and piano, Op. 29 (1923); words by Jean Hytier
- Le Gai printemps for soprano or tenor and piano; words by Paul Rispal

Choral

- Choral: Chant donné pour le contrepoint rigoureux (1913)
- Le Repos en Egypte, Chorus in 4 parts for female chorus and piano (1917); words by Albert Samain
- Lamentation des 300 captives du Roi des Morts, Chorus in 3 parts for female chorus and piano or orchestra, Op. 48 (1922); words by Chrétien de Troyes
- A Lauterbach, Chanson for 4 mixed voices a cappella (1937); words by the composer after Alsatian texts
- Hymne au travail: Laboremus for 2-part children's chorus and piano (1937); words by Jean Bergeaud
- Hymne des créatures d'après St François d'Assise for unison chorus and piano, or organ, or harmonium (1948); also for 3 voices a cappella; words by René Christian-Frogé
- Qui veut avoir liesse, Double Canon for 4 mixed voices a cappella; words by Clément Marot
- Recueillement, Chorus in 2 parts for soprano and female chorus; words by Georges Parmentier

Literary and pedagogical works

- Mes exercices for piano (1946)
- Douze Leçons de solfège: à changements de clefs sur toutes les clefs (difficiles et très difficiles), Henry Lemoine, 1953.
- Principes de théorie musicale, Henry Lemoine, 1955.
- Dictées polyphoniques, Henry Lemoine, 1956.
- Le solfège, Presses universitaires de France, 1962.
- Rythmes et modes: 20 Leçons de solfège à changements de clés sur toutes les clés, avec accompagnement de piano, Henry Lemoine, 1962.
