= Mamut Saine =

Gambian footballer (born 1993)

Personal information
- Full name: Mamut Roman Saine
- Date of birth: 31 December 1993 (age 32)
- Place of birth: Kanifing, The Gambia
- Height: 1.76 m (5 ft 9 in)
- Position: Midfielder

Youth career
- Seaview

Senior career*
Years	Team	Apps	(Gls)
2012–2014	Bizertin	4	(0)
2014	→ ES Métlaoui (loan)	3	(0)
2014–2015	Fokikos	9	(1)
2015	Anagennisi Karditsa	18	(0)
2015–2016	Chania	11	(0)
2016	RoPS	17	(1)
2016	→ Santa Claus (loan)	2	(0)
2018–2019	Al-Qaisumah		

International career
	Gambia U20	7	(2)
- * Club domestic league appearances and goals

Mamut Saine (born 31 December 1993) is a Gambian professional footballer who plays as a midfielder.

== Club career ==
After Saine started football in his native Gambia, he played in Tunisia and Greece. In March 2016, he signed with Finnish Veikkausliiga club Rovaniemen Palloseura after a trial period. During 2018–2019 he played for Al-Qaisumah in Saudi third-tier Saudi Second Division.

== International career ==
Saine has represented Gambia at under-20 youth international level.

== Career statistics ==
As of 26 February 2025

Appearances and goals by club, season and competition
Club	Season	League			Cup (Note: Includes Tunisian Cup, Greek Cup, Suomen Cup, Finnish League Cup and Saudi King's Cup)		Continental		Total	
Club	Season	Division	Apps	Goals	Apps	Goals	Apps	Goals	Apps	Goals
Bizertin	2011–12	Tunisian Ligue 1	0	0	1	0	–		1	0
Bizertin	2012–13	Tunisian Ligue 1	2	0	2	1	1 (Note: Appearance(s) in Arab Club Champions Cup)	0	5	1
Bizertin	2013–14	Tunisian Ligue 1	2	0	0	0	–		2	0
Bizertin	Total		4	0	3	1	1	0	8	1
ES Métlaoui (loan)	2013–14	Tunisian Ligue 1	3	0	2	0	–		5	0
Fokikos	2014–15	Football League Greece	9	1	2	0	–		11	1
Anagennisi Karditsa	2014–15	Football League Greece	18	0	–		–		18	0
Chania	2015–16	Football League Greece	11	0	3	0	–		14	0
RoPS	2016	Veikkausliiga	17	1	1	0	2 (Note: Appearances in UEFA Europa League)	0	20	1
Santa Claus (loan)	2016	Kakkonen	2	0	–		–		2	0
Al-Qaisumah	2018–19	Saudi Second Division			2	0	–		2	0
Al-Qaisumah	2019–20	Saudi Second Division			1	0	–		1	0
Al-Qaisumah	Total				3	0	0	0	3	0
Career total			64	2	14	1	3	0	81	3

== Honours ==
CA Bizertin

- Tunisian Cup: 2012–13
