= Prince Nnake =

Nigerian footballer

Prince Tochukwu Nnake
Personal information
- Full name: Prince Tochukwu Nnake
- Date of birth: September 26, 1989 (age 37)
- Place of birth: Port Harcourt, Nigeria
- Height: 1.93 m (6 ft 4 in)
- Position: Striker

Youth career
- Dolphins F.C.

Senior career*
Years	Team	Apps	(Gls)
2006–2007	F.C. Abuja (loan)	21	(6)
2007–2008	Dolphin F.C.	37	(17)
2009–2010	Sharks F.C.	27	(9)
2010	→ R. Union Saint-Gilloise (loan)	30	(12)
2010–2011	R. Union Saint-Gilloise	24	(8)
2012–2013	Kwara United	1	(-)
2014–	Tersana SC	-	(-)
2014–2015	Alassiouty Sport	26	(11)
2016—2017	Sabah FA	25	(9)
2017–2018	TOL	1	(-)
2018–2019	Al-Hejaz	20	(14)
- * Club domestic league appearances and goals

Prince Tochukwu Nnake (born 26 September 1989) is a Nigerian football player.

== Early life ==
Nnake was born in Port Harcourt, Nigeria.

== Career ==
He began his career in 2010 playing for Dolphins F.C. The team played in the 2nd division of the NPFL and in the CAF confederation. Prince Nnake was the Dolphin's leading scorer in CAF and was invited to the senior national team.

In 2009 he transferred to Sharks F.C. On 20 February 2010 he was loaned to the Belgian League club R. Union Saint-Gilloise. He scored four goals in his first ten games for his new club R. Union Saint-Gilloise. He finished the league with eight goals, tied with two teammate,

In 2011 was with grasshopper for 5 month, but could not secure a contract because his Nigerian team refused to release him.

In 2012 he was with Kwara United for half a season and then played for (Tersana SC) in Cairo. He later moved to Alassiouty Sport. He scored his first league game for his club in the premiere league against Zamalek SC.

Prince Nnake moved to northern Cyprus and joined Turk Ocagi Limasol S.K (TOL SK) and then joined Malaysian premiere league team Sabah FA, where he scored 9 goals.

He then joined Al-Hejaz in Saudi Arabia where he was the 2nd leading scorer that season with 14 goals. He moved to Saudi club Al-Hejaz in 2018.

== Honours ==
- Turk Ocagi Limasol S.K
- Kibris Kupasi (State Cup):2017
