= Hussain Al-Nakhli =

Saudi Arabian footballer

Personal information
- Full name: Hussain Radha Al-Nakhli
- Date of birth: 30 January 1995 (age 31)
- Place of birth: Saudi Arabia
- Height: 1.73 m (5 ft 8 in)
- Position: Defender

Team information
- Current team: Al-Jubail
- Number: 50

Youth career
- Al-Fateh

Senior career*
Years	Team	Apps	(Gls)
2015–2017	Al-Fateh	1	(0)
2017–2018	Al-Qala		
2018–2019	Al-Hait		
2019–2020	Al-Washm		
2020–2021	Al-Sadd		
2021–2023	Al-Lewaa		
2023–2025	Al-Sahel		
2025–	Al-Jubail		
- * Club domestic league appearances and goals

Hussain Al-Nakhli (Arabic: حسين النخلي; born 30 January 1995) is a Saudi football player who plays for Al-Jubail as a defender.
