= Saith Sakala =

Zambian footballer (born 1996)

Personal information
- Full name: Saith Sakala
- Date of birth: 17 July 1996 (age 30)
- Place of birth: Lusaka, Zambia
- Height: 1.74 m (5 ft 8 1/2 in)
- Position: Winger

Youth career
- 2010–2013: Happy Hearts Academy

Senior career*
Years	Team	Apps	(Gls)
2014–2016	NAPSA Stars		
2016–2017	Zanaco FC	24	(13)
2017–2020	Al-Fateh	19	(3)
2018–2019	→ Al-Nojoom (loan)	19	(14)
2019	→ Al-Tai (loan)	19	(14)
2019–2020	→ Al-Ansar (loan)	15	(3)
2020	Zanaco FC		
2020–2021	Jeddah	35	(10)
2021–2022	Bisha	20	(5)
2022–2023	Al-Lewaa		
2024	Afif		
2024–2025	Radwa		
- * Club domestic league appearances and goals as of 6 May 2020

Saith Sakala (born 17 July 1996 in Lusaka, Zambia) is a Zambian professional footballer who plays as a winger.

== Club career ==
=== Zambia ===
Sakala was born in Lusaka and joined Happy Hearts Academy in Zambia in 2010. He signed his first professional contract with Zambian Premier league club NAPSA Stars F.C. in 2014.

On 4 January 2024, Sakala joined Afif.
