= Milan Borjan =

Canadian soccer player (born 1987)

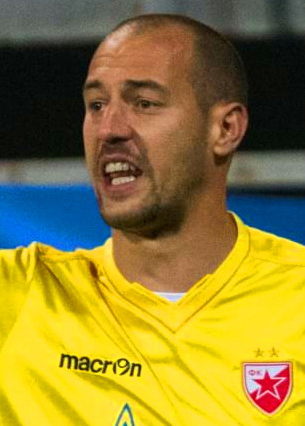
- Borjan with Red Star Belgrade in 2018

Personal information
- Full name: Milan Borjan
- Date of birth: 23 October 1987 (age 39)
- Place of birth: Knin, SR Croatia, Yugoslavia
- Height: 1.95 m (6 ft 5 in)
- Position: Goalkeeper

Team information
- Current team: Al-Riyadh
- Number: 82

Youth career
- Dinara Knin
- Radnički Jugopetrol
- East Hamilton SC
- Mount Hamilton SC
- 2006: Nacional Montevideo

Senior career*
Years	Team	Apps	(Gls)
2008	Quilmes	0	(0)
2009–2011	Rad	36	(0)
2011–2014	Sivasspor	43	(0)
2012	→ Vaslui (loan)	16	(0)
2014	Ludogorets Razgrad	2	(0)
2015	Radnički Niš	15	(0)
2015–2017	Ludogorets Razgrad	16	(0)
2017	→ Korona Kielce (loan)	14	(0)
2017–2024	Red Star Belgrade	180	(1)
2023–2024	→ Slovan Bratislava (loan)	25	(0)
2024–	Al-Riyadh	76	(0)

International career
2011–2023	Canada	80	(0)
Medal record
Representing Canada
Men's soccer
CONCACAF Nations League
Runner-up	2023
- * Club domestic league appearances and goals as of 20 October 2026

Milan Borjan (Serbian Cyrillic: Милан Борјан; born 23 October 1987) is a professional footballer who plays as a goalkeeper for Saudi Pro League club Al-Riyadh. Born in Yugoslavia, he played for the Canada national team.

== Early life ==
Borjan was born on 23 October 1987 in Knin, SFR Yugoslavia (today Croatia), to ethnic Serb parents Boško and Mirjana. He is also of Croatian descent through his paternal grandmother. Borjan got his first taste of organized football in the town, playing with the Dinara Knin youth side.

Borjan's family lived in Knin until Operation Storm in 1995, at which point his family fled to Belgrade, and Borjan began playing soccer with FK Radnički Beograd. In 2000, the family immigrated to Canada, first living in Winnipeg, Manitoba for a few months, before settling in Hamilton, Ontario where his parents still reside. He attended Glendale Secondary School. He played youth soccer in Canada with East Hamilton SC for six months before joining Mount Hamilton SC.

== Club career ==
=== Early career ===
Borjan went on trial with Boca Juniors in 2005, but failed to sign a contract with the club. In 2006, following a trial upon the recommendation of former Uruguayan footballer Jorge Armúa, he joined Club Nacional de Football in Montevideo, Uruguay, playing for their youth team, and in July 2007, he went on trial with the Argentine club Club Atlético River Plate. His final South American stint was with Quilmes, with whom he played from January 2008 through the end of the 2007–08 Primera B Nacional season.

=== Rad ===
Borjan returned to Serbia in January 2009, signing with the Belgrade Serbian SuperLiga club FK Rad. He initially had difficulty breaking into the team, signed as the third-string goalkeeper. However, due to trouble with the starting keeper's work permits, and an injury from the second string,

Borjan soon became the only available goalkeeper on the club roster. He made his debut on 16 August 2009 in a 3–2 victory over FK Smederevo. By fall 2010, he was the starting keeper, with a nine-game winning streak. Under his tenure, FK Rad became fourth in the league, gaining them a berth in the 2011–12 UEFA Europa League qualifying rounds.

=== Sivasspor ===
Following an appearance in the 2011 CONCACAF Gold Cup, Borjan joined the Turkish club Sivasspor, and made his debut on 11 September 2011 in a 2–1 loss against Karabükspor.

==== Loan to Vaslui ====
Due to a lack of playing time in Turkey, Borjan was loaned to Romanian club SC Vaslui in a deal that would keep him in Romania through the end of the season, with an option to purchase the player for an undisclosed transfer fee. Borjan joined the club as the starting goalkeeper and played seven clean sheet games in 16 starts, securing Vaslui a spot in the UEFA Champions League.

==== Return to Sivasspor ====
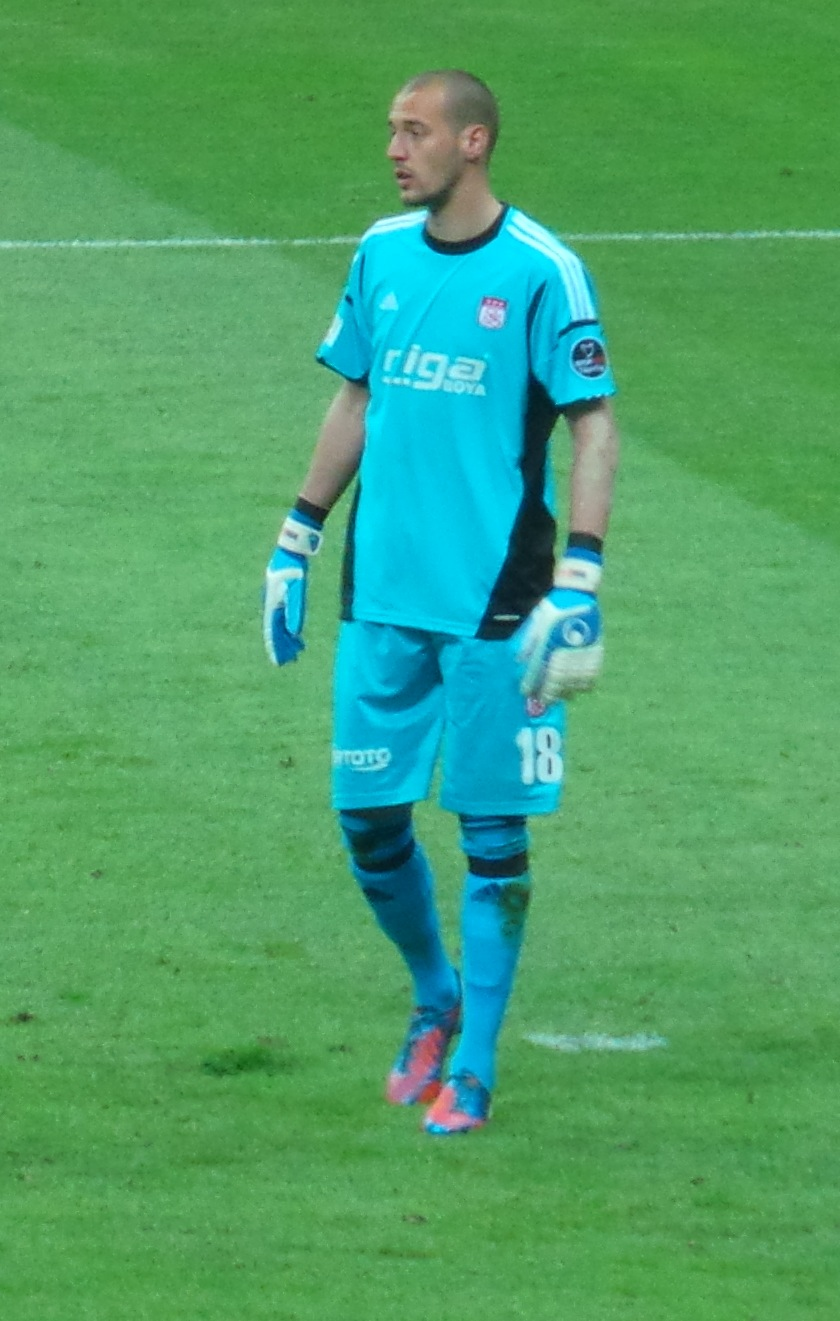
Borjan with Sivasspor in 2013

After returning from a successful stint in Romania, Borjan returned to the starting lineup in the third match of the 2012–13 season in a 0–0 draw against Fenerbahçe on 2 September 2012. In February 2014, following a decrease in playing time under new manager Roberto Carlos, Borjan's contract with Sivasspor was terminated. Speculation arose, after the termination, that a deal had been put in place for Borjan to join Napoli in June, as the Turkish Football Association blocked a January move.

=== Ludogorets Razgrad ===
Following reports that he had signed for Bosnian Premier League club Sarajevo as a free agent, Borjan accepted an offer from Bulgarian club PFC Ludogorets Razgrad on 12 September 2014. The club had already qualified for the 2014–15 UEFA Champions League group stage, and four days after signing, Borjan made his club debut in a 2–1 Champions League away defeat to Liverpool F.C. That game marked the first time that a Canadian international played in the group stage since Lars Hirschfeld played with Rosenborg BK in 2007. Razgrad released Borjan shortly thereafter, having secured first-choice goalkeeper Vladislav Stoyanov through the summer of 2015.

=== Radnički Niš ===
Spurning interest from Sarajevo, Borjan signed a one-year contract with SuperLiga club FK Radnički Niš on 15 February 2015. Due to his Serbian passport, Borjan did not count as a foreigner while playing at Radnički. He debuted in a 0–0 draw against Red Star Belgrade on 23 February, the first of three clean sheets in a row.

=== Return to Ludogorets Razgrad ===
Borjan turned down a contract to return to Radnički, instead returning to the Bulgarian A Football Group of Ludogorets, where he signed a three-year deal on 2 June 2015. Although he was signed as the second-string goalkeeper, Borjan began to start after Stoyanov sustained a major injury.

==== Loan to Korona Kielce ====
On 15 February 2017, Borjan was loaned to the Ekstraklasa club Korona Kielce through the end of the season, where he made 14 league appearances and five clean sheets.

=== Red Star Belgrade ===
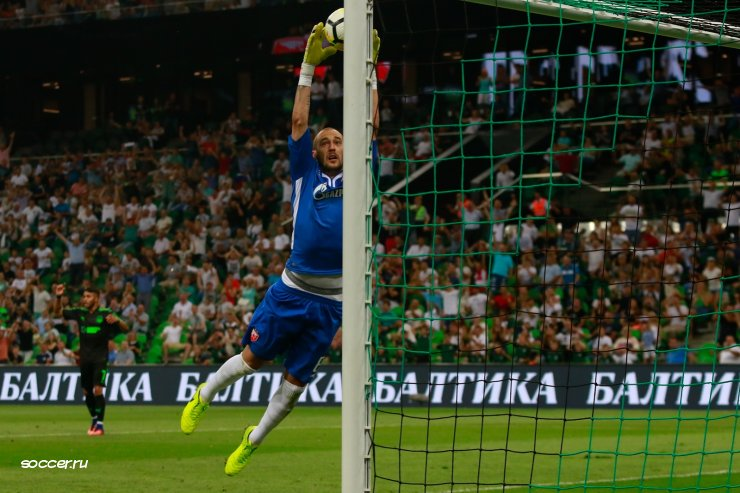
Borjan playing for Red Star Belgrade in 2017

Three years after rumors of a transfer to Red Star Belgrade, Borjan made the transfer official, replacing Filip Manojlović on 24 July 2017. Borjan signed a three-year contract with the club and chose the jersey number 82.

He made his debut in the first leg of the third qualifying round for the 2017–18 UEFA Europa League, keeping a clean sheet in a home victory against Sparta Prague on 27 July 2017. He played his first eternal derby with the club a month later. In his second season with the club, Borjan would help Red Star qualify for the 2018–19 UEFA Champions League, and would earn two clean sheets: once in the group stage opener against Napoli, and again in a 2–0 home win against Liverpool. In February 2019, Zvezdan Terzić announced that Borjan would sign a contract extension until 2023, and would finish his career after that. He was honoured by Red Star shortly after as the club athlete of the year.

On 23 May 2022 Borjan notably scored a penalty for Red Star in their final game of the 2021–22 Serbian SuperLiga against Voždovac, as the club clinched their fifth-straight title. In July 2022, despite earlier talk of retirement after his current deal ended, Borjan signed a contract extension until 2026.

In June 2023, Borjan revealed in an interview with Sportski žurnal that after meeting with new Red Star coach Barak Bakhar, he was told by his coaching staff that he would no longer be the first-choice option at the club going forward.

In June 2024, Borjan and Red Star Belgrade mutually agreed to the termination of his contract.

==== Loan to Slovan Bratislava ====
In June 2023, Borjan joined Slovan Bratislava of the Niké Liga on loan.

=== Al-Riyadh ===
He joined Saudi Premier League club Al-Riyadh on August 21, 2024. He made his debut three days later in a 3-3 draw with Al Wedah.

== International career ==
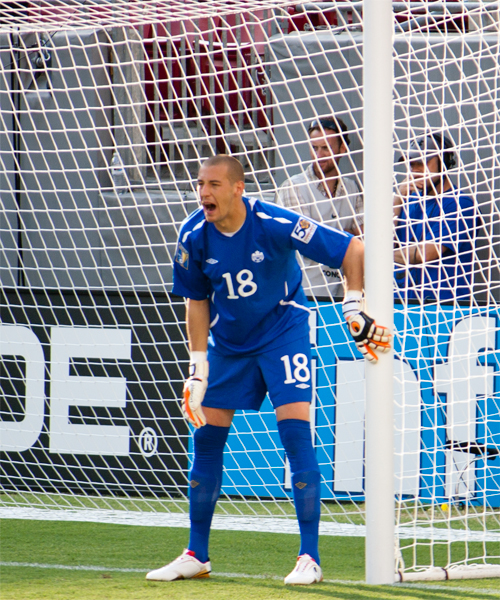
Borjan with the Canada national team in 2011

Borjan was called to join the Canada national team in 2010, following strong performances with FK Rad. He was called up to the Canadian senior team on 3 February 2011, and made his team debut in an exhibition game against Greece a week later. That summer, Borjan was called up to the 2011 CONCACAF Gold Cup roster, making his Gold Cup debut on 11 June 2011 in a 1–0 victory over Guadeloupe at Raymond James Stadium. He also recorded his first national team game on home soil at BMO Field on 1 June 2011 in an exhibition against Ecuador that ended in a 2–2 draw.

Due to the suspension of first choice goalkeeper Lars Hirschfeld, Borjan started in the 0–0 home draw against Honduras in a 2014 FIFA World Cup qualifier on 12 June 2012. Since the end of 2012, Borjan has been Canada's starting goalkeeper, named to the final squad in the 2013, 2017, and 2019 CONCACAF Gold Cup. He earned his first red card for Canada on 11 June 2015 in a 2018 World Cup qualifying match, handling the ball outside the box after a mistake from Julian de Guzman.

Borjan remained Canada's starting goalkeeper for the 2022 FIFA World Cup qualifiers. During this campaign, he played a crucial role in one of Canada's best ever results, making a goal-line save to keep Canada in the lead during stoppage time in a 2–1 victory over Mexico in Edmonton, Canada's first win against Mexico in 21 years. He also kept a clean sheet against the United States in a 2–0 victory in Hamilton, Ontario, after which he was named by Canada Soccer as Canada's player of the month for January. On November 13, 2022, Borjan was named to Canada's squad for the 2022 FIFA World Cup. In Canada's second match against Croatia, Borjan was the target of verbal taunts and abuse from Croatian supporters, with Canada Soccer filing a formal complaint with FIFA post-game.

In June 2023, Borjan was named to Canada's final squad for the 2023 CONCACAF Nations League Finals. He played in both the Semi-final and Final as Canada finished runners-up to the United States. On June 19 Borjan was named to the final squad for the 2023 CONCACAF Gold Cup. He departed the team prior to their third match of the tournament against Cuba due to injury.

== Other ==
During June and July 2026, Borjan appeared on TSN as a pre-match, post-match, and halftime analyst for the Canadian network's 2026 FIFA World Cup coverage.

== Personal life ==
Borjan is married to Snežana Filipović, a former marketing director of FK Partizan and sister of Nenad Filipović. He has a younger sister, Nikolija, and a younger brother Nikola, also a goalkeeper. Borjan speaks fluent English, Bulgarian, Spanish and Serbian.

== Career statistics ==
=== Club ===
As of match played 20 October 2026

Appearances and goals by club, season and competition
Club	Season	League			National cup (Note: Includes Turkish Cup, Romanian Cup, Bulgarian Cup, Serbian Cup, Slovak Cup, King's Cup)		Continental		Total	
Club	Season	Division	Apps	Goals	Apps	Goals	Apps	Goals	Apps	Goals
Rad	2009–10	Serbian SuperLiga	13	0	0	0	—		13	0
Rad	2010–11	Serbian SuperLiga	23	0	0	0	—		23	0
Rad	Total		36	0	0	0	—		36	0
Sivasspor	2011–12	Süper Lig	10	0	0	0	—		10	0
Sivasspor	2012–13	Süper Lig	29	0	8	0	—		37	0
Sivasspor	2013–14	Süper Lig	4	0	5	0	—		9	0
Sivasspor	Total		43	0	13	0	—		56	0
Vaslui (loan)	2011–12	Liga I	16	0	3	0	—		19	0
Ludogorets Razgrad	2014–15	Bulgarian First League	2	0	1	0	1 (Note: Appearance(s) in UEFA Champions League)	0	4	0
Ludogorets Razgrad	2015–16	Bulgarian First League	9	0	0	0	0	0	9	0
Ludogorets Razgrad	2016–17	Bulgarian First League	7	0	2	0	1	0	10	0
Ludogorets Razgrad	Total		18	0	3	0	2	0	23	0
Radnički Niš (loan)	2014–15	Serbian SuperLiga	15	0	0	0	—		15	0
Korona Kielce (loan)	2016–17	Ekstraklasa	14	0	0	0	—		14	0
Red Star Belgrade	2017–18	Serbian SuperLiga	31	0	3	0	12 (Note: Appearances in UEFA Europa League)	0	46	0
Red Star Belgrade	2018–19	Serbian SuperLiga	28	0	4	0	14	0	46	0
Red Star Belgrade	2019–20	Serbian SuperLiga	26	0	2	0	14	0	42	0
Red Star Belgrade	2020–21	Serbian SuperLiga	32	0	3	0	12 (Note: Three appearances in UEFA Champions League, nine appearances in UEFA Europa League)	0	47	0
Red Star Belgrade	2021–22	Serbian SuperLiga	30	1	4	0	13 (Note: Four appearances in UEFA Champions League, nine appearances in UEFA Europa League)	0	47	1
Red Star Belgrade	2022–23	Serbian SuperLiga	33	0	4	0	10 (Note: Four appearances in UEFA Champions League, six appearances in UEFA Europa League)	0	47	0
Red Star Belgrade	Total		180	1	20	0	75	0	275	1
Slovan Bratislava (loan)	2023–24	Slovak First League	25	0	2	0	15 (Note: Six appearances in UEFA Champions League, two appearances in UEFA Europa League, seven appearances in UEFA Europa Conference League)	0	42	0
Al-Riyadh	2024–25	Saudi Pro League	33	0	1	0	—		34	0
Al-Riyadh	2025–26	Saudi Pro League	34	0	2	0	—		36	0
Al-Riyadh	2026–27	Saudi Pro League	9	0	1	0	—		10	0
Al-Riyadh	Total		76	0	4	0	—		80	0
Career total			423	1	45	0	92	0	561	1

=== International ===
As of match played 21 November 2023

Appearances and goals by national team and year
National team	Year	Apps	Goals
Canada	2011	5	0
Canada	2012	4	0
Canada	2013	7	0
Canada	2014	5	0
Canada	2015	7	0
Canada	2016	5	0
Canada	2017	5	0
Canada	2018	3	0
Canada	2019	9	0
Canada	2020	0	0
Canada	2021	9	0
Canada	2022	12	0
Canada	2023	9	0
Total		80	0

== Honours ==
Ludogorets Razgrad

- Bulgarian First League: 2014–15, 2015–16

Red Star Belgrade

- Serbian SuperLiga: 2017–18, 2018–19, 2019–20, 2020–21, 2021–22, 2022–23
- Serbian Cup: 2020–21, 2021–22, 2022–23

Slovan Bratislava

- Slovak First League: 2023–24

Canada

- CONCACAF Nations League runner up: 2023

Individual

- Serbian SuperLiga Team of the Season: 2018–19, 2022–23
