= Bilel Souissi =

Tunisian footballer

Personal information
- Full name: Mohamed Bilel Souissi
- Date of birth: 10 June 1986 (age 40)
- Place of birth: Tunisia
- Height: 1.88 m (6 ft 2 in)
- Position: Goalkeeper

Team information
- Current team: Métlaoui

Youth career
- Korba

Senior career*
Years	Team	Apps	(Gls)
2008–2010	Espérance		
2009–2010	→ Korba (loan)		
2010–2013	Kairouan	22	(0)
2013–2018	Métlaoui	97	(0)
2018–2019	Al-Adalah	35	(0)
2019–2020	Ben Guerdane	14	(0)
2020–2021	Al-Diriyah	33	(0)
2021–2022	Al-Nahda	34	(0)
2022–	Métlaoui	0	(0)
- * Club domestic league appearances and goals

Bilel Souissi (born 10 June 1986) is a Tunisian footballer who plays as a goalkeeper for Métlaoui.
