= Khaled Haj Othman =

Syrian footballer (born 1987)

Personal information
- Full name: Khaled Al Haji Othman
- Date of birth: 1 May 1987 (age 39)
- Place of birth: Afrin, Aleppo, Syria
- Height: 1.87 m (6 ft 2 in)
- Position: Goalkeeper

Team information
- Current team: Hutteen

Youth career
- Al-Ittihad

Senior career*
| Years | Team | Apps | (Gls) |
| 2008–2018 | Al-Ittihad | | |
| 2018–2019 | Damac | 37 | (0) |
| 2019–2020 | Al-Taliya | | |
| 2020–2022 | Al-Ittihad | | |
| 2022–2023 | Qilwah | | |
| 2023– | Hutteen | | |

International career^{‡}
| 2011– | Syria | 7 | (0) |
- * Club domestic league appearances and goals ‡ National team caps and goals as of 6 December 2021

Khaled Al Haj Othman (Arabic: خَالِد الْحَاج عُثمَان) (born 1 May 1987 in Aleppo, Syria) is a Syrian football goalkeeper.

== Honour and Titles ==
=== Club ===
Al-Ittihad

- Syrian Cup: 2011
- AFC Cup: 2010
