= David Nworah Ifeanyi =

Nigerian footballer

David Ifeanyi
Personal information
- Full name: David Nworah Ifeanyi
- Date of birth: 18 October 1994 (age 32)
- Place of birth: Nigeria
- Height: 1.78 m (5 ft 10 in)
- Position: Midfielder

Team information
- Current team: Atlantis
- Number: 24

Senior career*
Years	Team	Apps	(Gls)
2012–2016	Olympic de Safi		
2016	Golden Arrows		
2016	East Riffa		
2016–2017	Mosta		
2017	Al-Orouba		
2017–2018	Mosta		
2019	Al-Ansar		
2020-2021	Mosta		
2021-2022	VJS Vantaa	22	(0)
2022-2023	Al-Sinaa Sport club		
2023-2024	VJS Vantaa	6	(1)
2024-2025	Atlantis	35	(2)
2026	Pallokerho Keski-Uusimaa	4	(0)
2026-	Atlantis	7	(0)
- * Club domestic league appearances and goals as of 7 November 2026

David Nworah Ifeanyi (born 18 October 1994) is a Nigerian footballer who plays as a central midfielder for Finnish club Atlantis.

== Club career ==
David Nworah Ifeanyi playing football in the streets of Onitsha in 2012. His football skills and abilities drew a lot of attention to him and afforded him the opportunity to play in some academies in the city of Onitsha and Lagos. His footballing abilities came to prominence when he moved to the city of enugu to play for Enugu rangers international feeders team. Before he was invited to the Nigeria national under-17 football team in 2010. In 2011 David Nworah Ifeanyi joined Gabros international football club currently known as Ifeanyi uba Football club and helped the team to get promotion to Nigeria National League.

== Olympique safi ==
David Nworah ifeanyi joined Olympic Club de Safi football team in August 2012, On 18 October 2012 David Nworah Ifeanyi was given a professional contract and finished the year playing with the reserve team where he managed to score 5 goals and many assists. David Nworah Ifeanyi made his first team debut for Olympic club safi in the Botola as substitute against hassania AgadirHUSA and made an impressive performance which his team won 1–0. David Nworah received many positive comments for his performance in the match. David made his first team start In March 2014 under Coach youssef fertout, when his team was 3rd to the last of the table which many fans believed that the team may end up relegated. David Nworah made great performance throughout the end of the season and helped his team Olympique Safi avoid relegation.
