= Hermann Kouao =

Ivorian footballer (born 1989)

Personal information
- Full name: Hermann Kouao
- Date of birth: 31 December 1989 (age 36)
- Place of birth: Ivory Coast
- Height: 1.83 m (6 ft 0 in)
- Position: Forward

Senior career*
Years	Team	Apps	(Gls)
2010–2013	SO de l'Armée		
2013–2015	Séwé		
2015	Smouha		
2015–2016	Al Urooba		
2016	Al Ittihad Alexandria		
2016–2017	Al Masry		
2017–2018	Çetinkaya Türk		
2018	Mirbat		
2018–2019	Al-Nojoom		
2019–2020	Al Tadhamon		
2020–2021	Al-Diriyah		
- * Club domestic league appearances and goals

Hermann Kouao (born 31 December 1989) is an Ivorian footballer who plays as a forward.
