= Al-Najma Club Stadium =

Stadium in Unaizah, Saudi Arabia

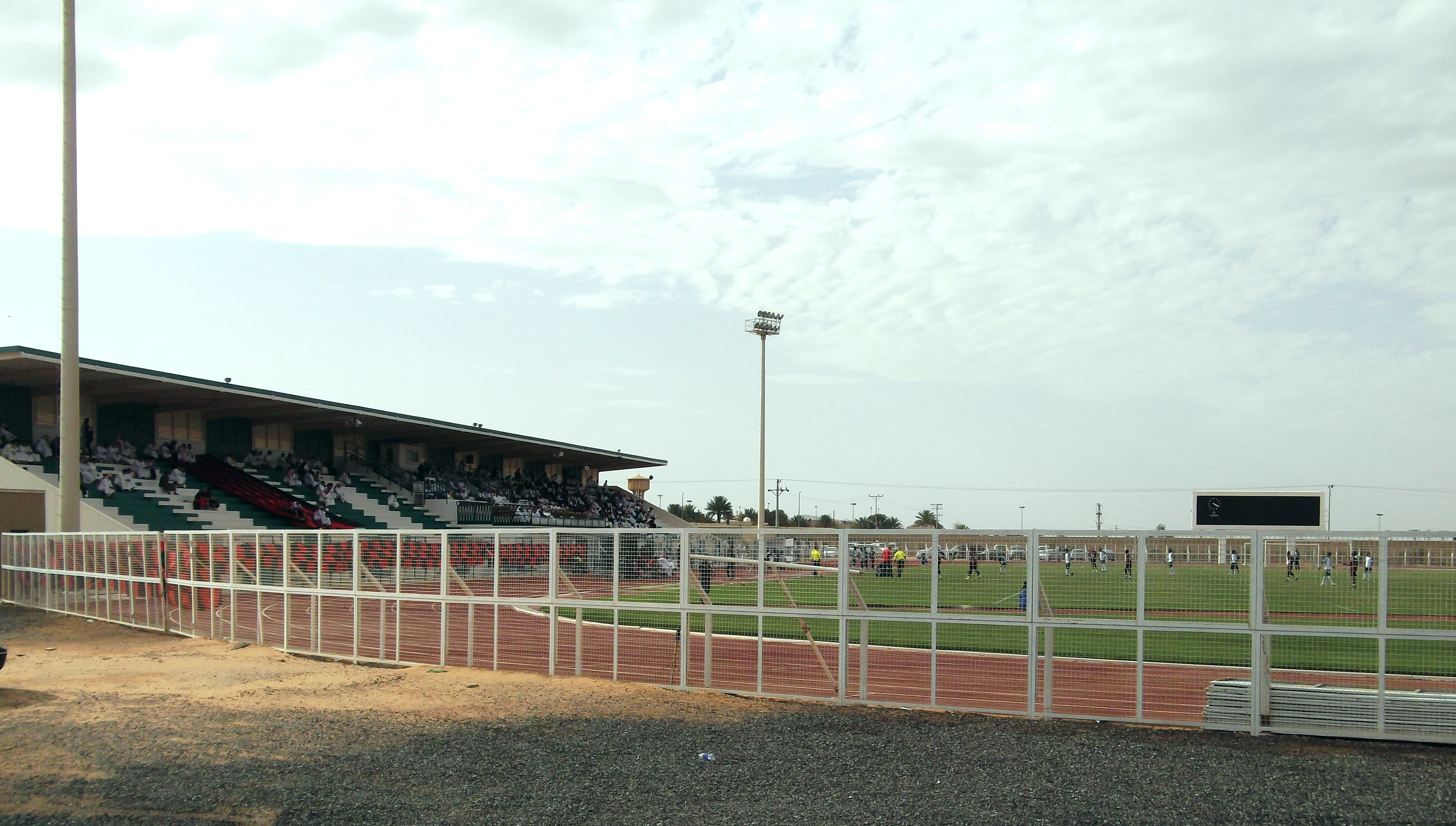
- Interactive map of Al-Najma Club Stadium
- Full name: Al-Najma Club Stadium
- Location: Unaizah, Saudi Arabia
- Coordinates: 26°5′43″N 44°2′53″E
- Owner: General Presidency of Youth Welfare
- Capacity: 3,000
- Surface: Grass

Construction
- Opened: 1985
- Cost: 120 million s.r

Tenant
- Al-Najma

Al-Najma Club Stadium is a multi-use stadium in Unaizah, Saudi Arabia with a capacity of 3,000 seats. It is mostly used for football matches, on club level by Al-Najma. It was opened in 1985.
