= Robert de Souza =

Brazilian footballer

Personal information
- Full name: Robert de Souza Ribeiro
- Date of birth: 9 May 1992 (age 34)
- Place of birth: Bahia, Brazil
- Position: Forward

Senior career*
Years	Team	Apps	(Gls)
2015	Leeds United	3	(1)
2015–2016	Bylis Ballsh	3	(0)
2017	Rio Branco-VN	0	(0)
2020	Al-Rawdhah	0	(0)
- * Club domestic league appearances and goals as of 19:28, 26 May 2018 (UTC)

Robert De Souza Ribeiro (born 9 May 1992), commonly known as Robert, is a Brazilian footballer.

== Career statistics ==
=== Club ===
As of 26 May 2018.

Club	Season	League			Cup		Continental		Other		Total	
Club	Season	Division	Apps	Goals	Apps	Goals	Apps	Goals	Apps	Goals	Apps	Goals
Bylis Ballsh	2016–17	Albanian First Division	3	0	2 (Note: Appearances in Albanian Cup)	1	–		0	0	5	1
Rio Branco-VN	2017	Série D	0	0	0	0	–		11 (Note: Appearances in Campeonato Capixaba Série B)	5	11	5
Career total			3	0	2	1	–		11	5	16	6
