= Patrick Carvalho =

Brazilian footballer

Personal information
- Full name: Patrick Carvalho dos Santos
- Date of birth: 6 February 1997 (age 29)
- Place of birth: Rio de Janeiro, Brazil
- Height: 1.78 m (5 ft 10 in)
- Position: Forward

Youth career
- 2010: Nova Iguaçu
- 2011–2012: Desportivo Brasil
- 2012–2017: Fluminense
- 2015: → Nova Iguaçu (loan)
- 2016: → Lahti (loan)

Senior career*
Years	Team	Apps	(Gls)
2017–2019	Fluminense	0	(0)
2017	→ Nova Iguaçu (loan)	8	(1)
2017	→ Boavista-RJ (loan)	0	(0)
2018	→ Tupi (loan)	15	(8)
2018–2019	→ Chiasso (loan)	7	(0)
2019–2020	Al Akhdoud		(21)
2020–2021	Al-Sahel		
2021	Al-Ansar		
2021	Paysandu	1	(0)
2021–2022	America (RJ)		
2022–2023	Nova Venécia	14	(9)
2022	→ Brusque (loan)	10	(0)
2023	→ São Bento (loan)		
2023	Sampaio Corrêa	6	(0)
2023	Pouso Alegre	2	(0)
2023–2024	AA Portuguesa	10	(3)
2024	Vitória		
2024–2025	Al-Nahda	0	(0)
- * Club domestic league appearances and goals

Patrick Carvalho dos Santos (born 6 February 1997), commonly known as Patrick Carvalho, is a Brazilian footballer who plays as a forward.

== Career statistics ==
=== Club ===
As of 4 April 2019.

Club	Season	League			Cup		Continental		Other		Total	
Club	Season	Division	Apps	Goals	Apps	Goals	Apps	Goals	Apps	Goals	Apps	Goals
Nova Iguaçu (loan)	2017	–			0	0	–		8 (Note: Appearances in the Campeonato Carioca)	1	8	1
Boavista-RJ (loan)	2017	Série D	0	0	3 (Note: Appearances in the Copa Rio)	1	–		0	0	3	1
Tupi (loan)	2018	Série C	7	6	0	0	–		8 (Note: Appearances in the Campeonato Mineiro)	2	15	8
Chiasso (loan)	2018–19	Swiss Challenge League	7	0	1 (Note: Appearances in the Swiss Cup)	1	–		0	0	8	1
Career total			14	6	4	2	0	0	16	3	34	11
