= Afif FC =

Association football club in Saudi Arabia

Afif
- Full name: Afif F.C.
- Founded: 1976; 50 years ago
- Chairman: Nasser Al-Sobeai
- Manager: Hakim Aoun
- League: Saudi Second Division
| Home colours | Away colours |

Afif Football Club is an association football club based in Afif, Saudi Arabia. Founded in 1976, the club plays in the Saudi Second Division.

== Current squad ==
As of Saudi Second Division:

Note: Flags indicate national team as defined under FIFA eligibility rules; some limited exceptions apply. Players may hold more than one non-FIFA nationality.

| No. | Pos. | Nation | Player |
|---|---|---|---|
| 2 | DF | KSA | Abdulmajeed Sonaitan |
| 3 | DF | KSA | Mohammed Sayegh |
| 4 | DF | KSA | Mazen Othman |
| 7 | MF | KSA | Fayez Al-Harthi |
| 8 | MF | KSA | Rayan Al-Harbi |
| 9 | FW | KSA | Meqren Eid |
| 10 | MF | MOZ | Fernando Domingos (on loan from Black Bulls) |
| 11 | MF | KSA | Sultan Al-Rouqi |
| 12 | DF | KSA | Naif Al-Otaibi |
| 13 | DF | KSA | Yassin Hamzah |
| 14 | MF | KSA | Abdullah Al-Damak |
| 16 | MF | KSA | Abdulaziz Al-Marhabi |
| 18 | MF | MOZ | Ângelo Cantolo (on loan from Black Bulls) |
| 19 | FW | CMR | Dilane Ekongolo |

| No. | Pos. | Nation | Player |
|---|---|---|---|
| 21 | MF | KSA | Ahmed Al-Ammari |
| 22 | GK | KSA | Mohammed Erijah |
| 24 | MF | KSA | Rami Al-Shamrani |
| 25 | DF | KSA | Rasheed Al-Bishi |
| 30 | GK | KSA | Salem Al-Boqami |
| 44 | DF | KSA | Saif Al-Qeshtah |
| 55 | DF | KSA | Mohammed Daghriri |
| 66 | GK | KSA | Musallam Al-Dossari |
| 70 | DF | KSA | Mohammed Al-Qarni |
| 88 | MF | KSA | Ahmed Sulaiman |
| 96 | DF | KSA | Khalid Sufyani |
| 99 | FW | POR | Pedro Catarino |
| — | MF | KSA | Abdulrahman Naji |
| — | FW | KSA | Bader Bandar |

== See also ==
- List of football clubs in Saudi Arabia
