= Al-Hejaz Club =

Association football club in Saudi Arabia

Al-Hejaz
- Full name: Al-Hejaz Club
- Founded: 1979
- Ground: King Saud Sport City Stadium; Baljurashi, Al Bahah, Saudi Arabia
- Capacity: 10,000
- Manager: Salim Al-Manga
- League: Saudi Third Division
Home colours	Away colours

Al-Hejaz Club (Arabic: نادي الحجاز) is a Saudi Arabian football team in Baljurashi City playing at the Saudi Third Division.

== See also ==
- List of football clubs in Saudi Arabia
