= Al-Hait Club =

Association football club in Saudi Arabia

Al-Hait
- Full name: Al-Hait Club
- Founded: 1977
- Ground: Al Hait, Ha'il, Saudi Arabia
- Manager: Farooq Janhaoui
- League: Saudi Fourth Division
Home colours	Away colours

Al-Hait Football Club is a Saudi Arabian football team in Al Hait City playing at the Saudi Fourth Division.

== See also ==
- List of football clubs in Saudi Arabia
