= Al-Jubail Club =

Association football club in Saudi Arabia

Al-Jubail
- Full name: Al-Jubail Club
- Founded: 1965
- Ground: Jubail, Eastern Province, Saudi Arabia
- Manager: Darko Nestorović
- League: First Division League
- 2025–26: FDL, 18th of 18
Home colours	Away colours

Al-Jubail Club is a Saudi Arabian football team in Jubail City that currently playing in the Saudi First Division, the second tier of the Saudi football league system.

== Current squad ==
As of Saudi First Division League:

Note: Flags indicate national team as defined under FIFA eligibility rules; some limited exceptions apply. Players may hold more than one non-FIFA nationality.

No.	Pos.	Nation	Player
6	MF	SEN	Ousseynou Thioune
11	FW	KSA	Ali Al Jubaya
12	DF	KSA	Naif Al-Khaldi
13	DF	KSA	Badr Al-Shardi
14	MF	KSA	Omar Fallatah
17	MF	KSA	Anas Al-Omari
18	MF	KSA	Azzam Al-Salman
21	GK	KSA	Ali Bouamer
23	DF	BRA	Roberto Dias

No.	Pos.	Nation	Player
24	DF	KSA	Saleh Al-Otaibi
25	MF	KSA	Eisa Al-Amoudi
28	MF	MAR	Zakaria Lahlali
33	DF	KSA	Riyadh Al-Asmari
50	DF	KSA	Hussain Al-Nakhli
76	MF	MAR	Fayçal Fajr
88	DF	KSA	Asaed Al-Dohailan
92	GK	KSA	Wadia Al-Obaid
93	MF	KSA	Sattam Al-Shammari
95	MF	KSA	Bassam Al-Bishi
97	DF	KSA	Muhannad Al-Wehaibi
98	MF	KSA	Mohammed Al-Qarni

== Staff ==
Position	Name
Manager	(Bosnia and Herzegovina) Darko Nestorović
Assistant Manager	(Switzerland) Jonathan Mabanza
Goalkeeper Coach	(Saudi Arabia) Majed Al-Mahmoudi
Fitness Coach	(Bosnia and Herzegovina) Darko Mitrovic
Strength And Conditioning Coach	(Saudi Arabia) Nasser Al-Sheikh
Doctor	(Saudi Arabia) Yousef Al-Sheikh
Physiotherapists	(Saudi Arabia) Abdullah Ali
Kitman	(Saudi Arabia) Muhammad Al-Sultan

== See also ==
- List of football clubs in Saudi Arabia
