= 2017–18 Hajer Club season =

Hajer
2017–18 season
- Chairman: Hamad Al-Arifi
- Manager: Lotfi Sellimi (until 7 February 2018); Abdullah Al-Janoubi (from 7 February 2018)
- Stadium: Prince Abdullah bin Jalawi Stadium
- Prince MbS League: 5th
- King Cup: Round of 32 (knocked out by Al-Hilal)
- Top goalscorer: League: Faisel Al-Jamaan (7 goals); All: Faisel Al-Jamaan (8 goals)

The 2017–18 season was Hajer's second consecutive season in the Prince Mohammad bin Salman League following their relegation from the Professional League during the 2015–16 season. It was also their 67th year in existence.

== First-team squad ==
As of 26 January 2018

Note: Flags indicate national team as defined under FIFA eligibility rules; some limited exceptions apply. Players may hold more than one non-FIFA nationality.

| No. | Pos. | Nation | Player |
|---|---|---|---|
| 1 | GK | KSA | Khalid Radhy |
| 2 | DF | KSA | Radhi Al-Radhi |
| 4 | MF | KSA | Sami Abdulghani |
| 5 | DF | KSA | Mohammed Al-Mohanna |
| 6 | DF | KSA | Hamed Al-Sherif (on loan from Al-Ahli) |
| 8 | DF | KSA | Abdullah Al-Yousef |
| 9 | MF | KSA | Jehad Al-Zowayed |
| 10 | MF | KSA | Abdulhadi Al-Harajin |
| 11 | MF | KSA | Hassan Al-Solan |
| 13 | DF | KSA | Mohammed Al-Musained |
| 14 | MF | KSA | Abdurahman Al-Huraib (captain) |
| 15 | MF | KSA | Abduraheem Al-Debbas |
| 16 | MF | KSA | Mahmoud Bu Hassan |
| 17 | MF | KSA | Haitham Al-Khulaif |
| 18 | MF | KSA | Hossam Bu Hassan |
| 20 | FW | KSA | Abdulaziz Al-Mutair |
| 22 | GK | KSA | Abdulraouf Al-Daqeel |
| 23 | GK | KSA | Nawaf Al-Otaibi |

| No. | Pos. | Nation | Player |
|---|---|---|---|
| 25 | DF | KSA | Safwan Hawsawi |
| 27 | MF | KSA | Hassan Al-Mohammed |
| 29 | FW | KSA | Yousef Atallah |
| 32 | FW | KSA | Saleh Al-Arfej |
| 33 | GK | KSA | Radhi Al-Olaiwi |
| 34 | MF | KSA | Abdullah Othman |
| 35 | DF | KSA | Ahmed Al-Nufaili |
| 39 | MF | KSA | Nasser Al-Ojail |
| 44 | DF | KSA | Jaafer Al-Saeed |
| 55 | DF | TUN | Mohamed Houssem Slimene |
| 70 | FW | KSA | Faisel Al-Jamaan |
| 73 | DF | KSA | Hassan Al-Harbi |
| 80 | MF | KSA | Ibrahim Al-Ibrahim |
| 88 | MF | KSA | Eisa Al-Saeed |
| 90 | MF | KSA | Khaled Al-Aboud |
| 99 | FW | BRA | Willen |
| — | MF | KSA | Omar Al-Zayni |

=== Out on loan ===
Note: Flags indicate national team as defined under FIFA eligibility rules; some limited exceptions apply. Players may hold more than one non-FIFA nationality.

| No. | Pos. | Nation | Player |
|---|---|---|---|
| 7 | DF | NGA | Abdulshakour Hosawi (at Al-Batin until the end of the 2017–2018 season) |
| — | DF | KSA | Hassan Al-Sandal (at Al-Hazm until the end of the 2017–2018 season) |

== Transfers ==
=== In ===
| Date from | Position | Nationality | Name | From | Fee | Ref. |
|---|---|---|---|---|---|---|
| 26 May 2017 | LB | (Saudi Arabia) | Abdullah Al-Yousef | Al-Jeel | Free | |
| 30 May 2017 | RW | (Saudi Arabia) | Jehad Al-Zowayed | Al-Adalh | Free | |
| 2 June 2017 | CF | (Eritrea) | Ahmed Abdu Jaber | Al-Adalh | Free | |
| 19 June 2017 | LW | (Saudi Arabia) | Khaled Al-Aboud | Al-Ettifaq | Free | |
| 15 July 2017 | CB | (Saudi Arabia) | Mohammed Al-Mohanna | Al-Adalh | Free | |
| 23 July 2017 | LB | (Saudi Arabia) | Jaafer Al-Saeed | Al-Kawkab | Free | |
| 24 August 2017 | DM | (Saudi Arabia) | Ibrahim Al-Ibrahim | Al-Khaleej | Free | |
| 24 August 2017 | CF | (Saudi Arabia) | Yousef Al-Atallah | Al-Hilal | Free | |
| 25 August 2017 | CM | (Saudi Arabia) | Omar Al-Zayni | Al-Ahli | Free | |
| 18 September 2017 | CB | (Saudi Arabia) | Safwan Hawsawi | Al-Taawoun | Free | |
| 19 September 2017 | CM | (Saudi Arabia) | Eisa Al-Saeed | Al-Nojoom | Free | |
| 21 September 2017 | CF | (Saudi Arabia) | Abdulaziz Al-Mutair | Al-Hazm | Free | |
| 1 February 2018 | CB | (Tunisia) | Mohamed Houssem Slimene | ES Métlaoui | Free | |
| 1 February 2018 | CF | (Brazil) | Willen | Al-Batin | Free | |

=== Out ===
| Date from | Position | Nationality | Name | To | Fee | Ref. |
|---|---|---|---|---|---|---|
| 30 June 2017 | RW | (Cameroon) | Hervé Tchami | Unattached | Released | |
| 30 June 2017 | AM | (Saudi Arabia) | Mohammed Al-Safri | Unattached | Released | |
| 30 June 2017 | DM | (Saudi Arabia) | Salman Al-Hariri | Unattached | Released | |
| 30 June 2017 | CF | (Nigeria) | Bakr Hawsawi | Unattached | Released | |
| 30 June 2017 | GK | (Saudi Arabia) | Mohammed Al-Omran | Unattached | Released | |
| 5 June 2017 | LB | (Saudi Arabia) | Khaled Al-Barakah | Al-Hazm | Free | |
| 27 July 2017 | ST | (Saudi Arabia) | Jassem Al-Hamdan | Al-Nahda | Free | |
| 8 August 2017 | AM | (Saudi Arabia) | Mousa Al-Aoufi | Al-Ansar | Free | |
| 25 August 2017 | CF | (Eritrea) | Ahmed Abdu Jaber | Al-Wehda | Free | |
| 11 January 2018 | RW | (Saudi Arabia) | Riyadh Al-Ibrahim | Al-Raed | Free | |

=== Loans in ===
| Date from | Position | Nationality | Name | From | Date Until | Ref. |
|---|---|---|---|---|---|---|
| 16 August 2017 | CB | (Saudi Arabia) | Hamed Al-Sherif | Al-Ahli | 30 June 2018 | |

=== Loans out ===
| Date from | Position | Nationality | Name | To | Date Until | Ref. |
|---|---|---|---|---|---|---|
| 5 August 2017 | LB | (Saudi Arabia) | Hassan Al-Sandal | Al-Orobah | 30 June 2018 | |
| 30 January 2018 | RB | (Nigeria) | Abdulshakur Hawsawi | Al-Batin | 30 June 2018 | |

== Competitions ==
=== Pre-season friendlies ===
| 28 July 2017 Friendly | Al-Khaleej (Saudi Arabia) | 1–2 | (Saudi Arabia) Hajer | Saihat |
| 19:00 AST | Darwish 90' (pen.) | Report | Al-Arfej 38'; Al-Ibrahim 85' | Stadium: Al-Khaleej Club Stadium |

| 3 August 2017 Friendly | Hajer (Saudi Arabia) | 3–1 | (Saudi Arabia) Al-Khaleej | Al-Hasa |
| 19:00 AST | Al-Jamaan 13'; Othman 45'; Al-Zowayed 57' | Report | Gilmar 73' (pen.) | Stadium: Hajer Club Stadium |

| 12 August 2017 Friendly | Al-Qadsiah (Saudi Arabia) | 2–3 | (Saudi Arabia) Hajer | Khobar |
| 21:00 AST | Shenqeeti; Al-Johani | Report | Al-Solan 5'; Al-Jamaan 49'; Al-Arfej 89' | Stadium: Al-Qadsiah Club Stadium |

| 20 August 2017 Friendly | Al-Nahda (Saudi Arabia) | 2–0 | (Saudi Arabia) Hajer | Dammam |
| 21:00 AST | Ghazwani 10'; Al-Dossari 86' | Report | | Stadium: Prince Fahad bin Salman Stadium |

| 27 August 2017 Friendly | Hajer (Saudi Arabia) | 3–0 | (Saudi Arabia) Al-Khaleej | Al-Hasa |
| 18:50 AST | Al-Zowayed 15'; Al-Aboud 71'; Al-Jamaan 86' | Report | | Stadium: Hajer Club Stadium |

| 29 August 2017 Friendly | Al-Ettifaq (Saudi Arabia) | 1–1 | (Saudi Arabia) Hajer | Dammam |
| 17:45 AST | Salinas 16' | Report | Al-Harajin 76' (pen.) | Stadium: Al-Ettifaq Club Stadium |

=== Prince Mohammad bin Salman League ===
==== League table ====
| Pos | Team | Pld | W | D | L | GF | GA | GD | Pts | Promotion, qualification or relegation |
|---|---|---|---|---|---|---|---|---|---|---|
| 1 | Al-Wehda (C, P) | 30 | 17 | 7 | 6 | 49 | 32 | +17 | 58 | Promotion to Professional League |
| 2 | Al-Hazem (P) | 30 | 15 | 8 | 7 | 50 | 32 | +18 | 53 | Promotion to Professional League |
| 3 | Al-Tai | 30 | 15 | 7 | 8 | 52 | 35 | +17 | 52 | Qualification to promotion play-offs |
| 4 | Al-Kawkab | 30 | 14 | 8 | 8 | 52 | 33 | +19 | 50 (Note: Al-Kawkab finished ahead of Hajer on head-to-head points: Al-Kawkab 2–0 Hajer, Hajer 2–2 Al-Kawkab) | Qualification to promotion play-offs |
| 5 | Hajer | 30 | 14 | 8 | 8 | 39 | 35 | +4 | 50 | |
| 6 | Al-Shoulla | 30 | 11 | 10 | 9 | 42 | 43 | −1 | 43 | |
| 7 | Al-Khaleej | 30 | 10 | 11 | 9 | 45 | 40 | +5 | 41 | |
| 8 | Al-Qaisumah | 30 | 11 | 7 | 12 | 52 | 54 | −2 | 40 | |
| 9 | Damac | 30 | 10 | 9 | 11 | 49 | 43 | +6 | 39 | |
| 10 | Al-Orobah | 30 | 9 | 11 | 10 | 36 | 39 | −3 | 38 | |
| 11 | Al-Nahda | 30 | 9 | 8 | 13 | 35 | 50 | −15 | 35 | |
| 12 | Al-Nojoom | 30 | 6 | 15 | 9 | 34 | 41 | −7 | 33 (Note: Head-to-head points: Al-Nojoom 8 pts; Al-Mujazzal 4 pts and –1 GD; Najran 4 pts and –2 GD (Al-Nojoom 2–1 Al-Mujazzal, Al-Mujazzal 0–0 Al-Nojoom, Al-Nojoom 2–0 Najran, Najran 1–1 Al-Nojoom, Najran 1–2 Al-Mujazzal, Al-Mujazzal 1–2 Najran).) | |
| 13 | Al-Mujazzal | 30 | 10 | 3 | 17 | 39 | 52 | −13 | 33 | |
| 14 | Najran (O) | 30 | 9 | 6 | 15 | 39 | 51 | −12 | 33 | Qualification to Relegation play-offs |
| 15 | Al-Watani (R) | 30 | 5 | 12 | 13 | 33 | 48 | −15 | 27 | Qualification to Relegation play-offs |
| 16 | Jeddah (O) | 30 | 5 | 10 | 15 | 43 | 61 | −18 | 25 | Qualification to Relegation play-offs |

Updated to match(es) played on 18 April 2018. Source: kooora.com
Rules for classification: 1) Points; 2) Head-to-head points; 3) Head-to-head goal difference; 4) Total goal difference; 5) Total goals scored; 6) Play-off (only for deciding champion, promotion and relegation).
(C) Champions; (O) Play-off winners; (P) Promoted; (R) Relegated

==== Results summary ====
| Overall | | | | | | | | Home | | | | | | Away | | | | | |
| Pld | W | D | L | GF | GA | GD | Pts | W | D | L | GF | GA | GD | W | D | L | GF | GA | GD |
|---|---|---|---|---|---|---|---|---|---|---|---|---|---|---|---|---|---|---|---|
| 30 | 14 | 8 | 8 | 39 | 35 | +4 | 50 | 8 | 7 | 0 | 22 | 12 | +10 | 6 | 1 | 8 | 17 | 23 | −6 |

Last updated: 18 April 2018.

==== Results by matchday ====
| Matchday | 1 | 2 | 3 | 4 | 5 | 6 | 7 | 8 | 9 | 10 | 11 | 12 | 13 | 14 | 15 | 16 | 17 | 18 | 19 | 20 | 21 | 22 | 23 | 24 | 25 | 26 | 27 | 28 | 29 | 30 |
|---|---|---|---|---|---|---|---|---|---|---|---|---|---|---|---|---|---|---|---|---|---|---|---|---|---|---|---|---|---|---|
| Ground | H | A | H | A | H | A | H | A | H | H | A | H | A | H | A | A | H | A | H | A | H | A | H | A | A | H | A | H | A | H |
| Result | D | L | D | L | D | W | W | W | D | W | L | D | W | D | L | L | D | L | W | L | W | W | W | L | W | W | D | W | W | W |
| Position | 8 | 14 | 14 | 15 | 14 | 13 | 9 | 5 | 6 | 3 | 5 | 5 | 4 | 4 | 5 | 8 | 8 | 8 | 8 | 8 | 7 | 6 | 6 | 6 | 6 | 5 | 5 | 5 | 5 | 5 |

Updated to match(es) played on 18 April 2018. Source:
A = Away; H = Home; W = Win; D = Draw; L = Loss

==== Matches ====
All times are local, AST (UTC+3).

Win Draw Loss Postponed

| 12 September 2017 1 | Hajer | 2–2 | Al-Kawkab | Al-Hasa |
| 18:30 | Al-Aboud 19'; Al-Solan 77' | Report | Al-Zahrani 33'; Diouf 90+6' | Stadium: Prince Abdullah bin Jalawi Stadium; Referee: Mohamed Al-Shehri |

| 20 September 2017 2 | Al-Nojoom | 1–0 | Hajer | Al-Hasa |
| 18:25 | Al-Batran 90+3' | Report | Al-Ojail (red card) 85' | Stadium: Prince Abdullah bin Jalawi Stadium; Referee: Mohammed Al-Nuhait |

| 26 September 2017 3 | Hajer | 2–2 | Damac | Al-Hasa |
| 18:15 | Al-Solan 78'; Othman 80' | Report | Suanon 49' (pen.); Zaylea 87' | Stadium: Prince Abdullah bin Jalawi Stadium; Referee: Ahmed Al-Shammari |

| 3 October 2017 4 | Al-Watani | 1–0 | Hajer | Tabuk |
| 16:05 | Eisa 82' | Report | | Stadium: King Khalid Sport City Stadium; Referee: Mohammed Al-Qarni |

| 10 October 2017 5 | Hajer | 0–0 | Al-Hazm | Al-Hasa |
| 18:00 | | Report | | Stadium: Prince Abdullah bin Jalawi Stadium; Referee: Abdulrahman Al-Shehri |

| 17 October 2017 6 | Al-Qaisumah | 1–2 | Hajer | Hafar al-Batin |
| 18:05 | Al-Shammeri 74' | | Al-Jamaan 65'; Al-Solan 85' | Stadium: Al-Batin Club Stadium; Referee: Ahmed Al-Tayyar |

| 25 October 2017 7 | Hajer | 2–0 | Al-Orobah | Al-Hasa |
| 17:45 | Al-Yousef 38'; Atallah 65' | Report | | Stadium: Prince Abdullah bin Jalawi Stadium; Referee: Mohammed Al-Qarni |

| 31 October 2017 8 | Al-Nahda | 0–1 | Hajer | Dammam |
| 17:40 | | Report | Atallah 54' | Stadium: Prince Fahd bin Salman Stadium; Referee: Ahmed Al-Shammari |

| 7 November 2017 9 | Hajer | 1–1 | Al-Shoulla | Al-Hasa |
| 17:35 | Atallah 12' | Report | Qaisi 26' (pen.) | Stadium: Al-Fateh Club Stadium; Referee: Raed Al-Zahrani |

| 14 November 2017 10 | Hajer | 2–1 | Al-Mujazzel | Al-Hasa |
| 17:30 | Al-Saeed 83', 84' | Report | Al-Yousef 66' | Stadium: Al-Fateh Club Stadium; Referee: Mohammed Al-Qarni |

| 21 November 2017 11 | Najran | 2–1 | Hajer | Abha |
| 15:30 | Al-Joni 36'; Al-Robeai 90+3' | | Al-Solan 33' | Stadium: Prince Sultan bin Abdul Aziz Stadium; Referee: Hussein Abo Shaheen |

| 28 November 2017 12 | Hajer | 0–0 | Al-Wehda | Al-Hasa |
| 17:30 | | Report | | Stadium: Prince Abdullah bin Jalawi Stadium; Referee: Khaled Al-Teris |

| 5 December 2017 13 | Al-Khaleej | 1–3 | Hajer | Qatif |
| 17:30 | Jorginho 68'; Meshqi (yellow card) 72' (yellow-red card) 84' | Report | Othman 8', 72'; Al-Jamaan 54' | Stadium: Prince Nayef bin Abdulaziz Stadium; Referee: Abdulrahman Al-Sultan |

| 13 December 2017 14 | Hajer | 1–1 | Jeddah | Al-Hasa |
| 17:30 | Al-Solan 79' | Report | El-Weshi 61' | Stadium: Prince Abdullah bin Jalawi Stadium; Referee: Fahad Al-Mirdasi |

| 20 December 2017 15 | Al-Tai | 2–0 | Hajer | Ha'il |
| 15:25 | Al-Enezi 35', 59' | | Al-Nufaili (red card) 25'; Al-Sherif (red card) 66' | Stadium: Prince Abdul Aziz bin Musa'ed Stadium; Referee: Mohammed Al-Qarni |

| 10 January 2018 16 | Al-Kawkab | 2–0 | Hajer | Al-Kharj |
| 15:20 | Bawbo 71'; Al-Saeed 81' | | | Stadium: Al-Shoulla Club Stadium; Referee: Shukri Al-Hanfosh |

| 17 January 2018 17 | Hajer | 1–1 | Al-Nojoom | Al-Hasa |
| 17:50 | Othman 2' | Report | Al-Harbi 53' (pen.) | Stadium: Prince Abdullah bin Jalawi Stadium; Referee: Abdulrahman Al-Sultan |

| 30 January 2018 19 | Hajer | 3–2 | Al-Watani | Al-Hasa |
| 18:00 | Al-Zowayed 20'; Al-Arfej 36'; Al-Jamaan 59' | Report | Eisa 16'; Al-Breh 45+1' | Stadium: Prince Abdullah bin Jalawi Stadium; Referee: Abdullah Al-Shehri |

| 3 February 2018 18 | Damac | 2–1 | Hajer | Khamis Mushait |
| 16:00 | Al-Harbi 50' (o.g.); Hazzam 54' | Report | Othman 13' | Stadium: Damac Club Stadium; Referee: Sultan Okairi |

| 7 February 2018 20 | Al-Hazm | 3–0 | Hajer | Ar Rass |
| 15:50 | Mustafa 22'; Khormi 61', 86' | Report | Slimene (red card) 58' | Stadium: Al Hazm Club Stadium; Referee: Sami Al-Jires |

| 13 February 2018 21 | Hajer | 1–0 | Al-Qaisumah | Al-Hasa |
| 18:15 | Al-Jamaan 16' | Report | | Stadium: Prince Abdullah bin Jalawi Stadium; Referee: Sultan Al-Harbi |

| 21 February 2018 22 | Al-Orobah | 2–3 | Hajer | Sakakah |
| 16:10 | Rawaf 2'; Al-Shameri 72' | | Al-Jamaan 29'; Al-Solan 66'; Al-Arfej 68' | Stadium: Al-Oruba Club Stadium; Referee: Mohammed Al-Smail |

| 27 February 2018 23 | Hajer | 2–0 | Al-Nahda | Al-Hasa |
| 18:25 | Al-Khulaif 16'; Willen 88' | Report | | Stadium: Prince Abdullah bin Jalawi Stadium; Referee: Abdulrahman Al-Sultan |

| 6 March 2018 24 | Al-Shoulla | 3–1 | Hajer | Al-Kharj |
| 18:35 | Qaisi 30'; Al-Menqash 74'; Al-Thowaibi 90+4' | Report | Al-Sherif 39' | Stadium: Al-Shoulla Club Stadium; Referee: Sami Al-Jires |

| 14 March 2018 25 | Al-Mujazzal | 1–2 | Hajer | Al-Majma'ah |
| 15:55 | Al-Yousef 49' | Report | Al-Arfej 31'; Willen 66' | Stadium: King Salman Sport City Stadium; Referee: Khaled Al-Teris |

| 20 March 2018 26 | Hajer | 1–0 | Najran | Al-Hasa |
| 18:30 | Al-Jamaan 38' | Report | | Stadium: Prince Abdullah bin Jalawi Stadium; Referee: Shukri Al-Hanfoush |

| 27 March 2018 27 | Al-Wehda | 1–1 | Hajer | Makkah |
| 19:15 | Al-Malki 19' | Report | Al-Huraib 70' | Stadium: King Abdul Aziz Stadium; Referee: Abdulrahman Al-Sultan |

| 3 April 2018 28 | Hajer | 2–1 | Al-Khaleej | Al-Hasa |
| 18:40 | Al-Yousef 55'; Willen 62' | Report | Al-Najrani 69' | Stadium: Prince Abdullah bin Jalawi Stadium; Referee: Khaled Al-Teris |

| 11 April 2018 29 | Jeddah | 1–2 | Hajer | Jeddah |
| 20:45 | El-Weshi 10' | Report | Al-Khulaif 40'; Willen 52' | Stadium: Reserve Stadium in King Abdullah Sports City; Referee: Sami Al-Jires |

| 18 April 2018 30 | Hajer | 2–1 | Al-Tai | Al-Hasa |
| 20:45 | Othman 61'; Al-Jamaan 68' | Report | Al-Enezi 36' | Stadium: Prince Abdullah bin Jalawi Stadium; Referee: Fahad Al-Mirdasi |

=== King Cup ===
All times are local, AST (UTC+3).

| 4 January 2018 Round of 32 | Al-Hilal | 2–1 | Hajer | Riyadh |
| 19:20 | Rivas 11'; Al Bulaihi (yellow card) 19'; Al-Qahtani 31' | Report | Al-Jamaan 23' | Stadium: Prince Faisal bin Fahd Stadium; Referee: Mohammed Al-Smail |

== Statistics ==
=== Appearances and goals ===
Last updated on 18 April 2018.

| No. | Pos | Nat | Player | Total | | Prince MbS League | | King Cup | |
| No. | Pos | Nat | Player | Apps | Goals | Apps | Goals | Apps | Goals |
Goalkeepers
| 1 | GK | (Saudi Arabia) KSA | Khalid Radhy | 17 | 0 | 17 | 0 | 0 | 0 |
| 22 | GK | (Saudi Arabia) KSA | Abdulraouf Al-Doqail | 0 | 0 | 0 | 0 | 0 | 0 |
| 23 | GK | (Saudi Arabia) KSA | Nawaf Al-Otaibi | 14 | 0 | 13 | 0 | 1 | 0 |
| 33 | GK | (Saudi Arabia) KSA | Radhi Al-Olaiwi | 0 | 0 | 0 | 0 | 0 | 0 |
Defenders
| 2 | DF | (Saudi Arabia) KSA | Radhi Al-Radhi | 3 | 0 | 0+2 | 0 | 1 | 0 |
| 5 | DF | (Saudi Arabia) KSA | Mohammed Al-Mohanna | 2 | 0 | 2 | 0 | 0 | 0 |
| 6 | DF | (Saudi Arabia) KSA | Hamed Al-Sherif | 24 | 1 | 23+1 | 1 | 0 | 0 |
| 8 | DF | (Saudi Arabia) KSA | Abdullah Al-Yousef | 20 | 2 | 19 | 2 | 1 | 0 |
| 13 | DF | (Saudi Arabia) KSA | Mohammed Al-Musained | 4 | 0 | 3+1 | 0 | 0 | 0 |
| 25 | DF | (Saudi Arabia) KSA | Safwan Hawsawi | 6 | 0 | 3+2 | 0 | 1 | 0 |
| 26 | DF | (Saudi Arabia) KSA | Abdulelah Al-Ghulab | 0 | 0 | 0 | 0 | 0 | 0 |
| 35 | DF | (Saudi Arabia) KSA | Ahmed Al-Nufaili | 13 | 0 | 11+2 | 0 | 0 | 0 |
| 44 | DF | (Saudi Arabia) KSA | Jaafer Al-Saeed | 1 | 0 | 0+1 | 0 | 0 | 0 |
| 55 | DF | (Tunisia) TUN | Mohamed Houssem Slimene | 9 | 0 | 9 | 0 | 0 | 0 |
| 73 | DF | (Saudi Arabia) KSA | Hassan Al-Harbi | 30 | 0 | 23+6 | 0 | 1 | 0 |
Midfielders
| 4 | MF | (Saudi Arabia) KSA | Sami Abdulghani | 24 | 0 | 22+1 | 0 | 1 | 0 |
| 9 | MF | (Saudi Arabia) KSA | Jehad Al-Zowayed | 13 | 1 | 6+6 | 1 | 0+1 | 0 |
| 10 | MF | (Saudi Arabia) KSA | Abdulhadi Al-Harajin | 0 | 0 | 0 | 0 | 0 | 0 |
| 14 | MF | (Saudi Arabia) KSA | Abdurahman Al-Huraib | 29 | 1 | 12+16 | 1 | 1 | 0 |
| 16 | MF | (Saudi Arabia) KSA | Mahmoud Bu Hassan | 0 | 0 | 0 | 0 | 0 | 0 |
| 17 | MF | (Saudi Arabia) KSA | Haitham Al-Khulaif | 30 | 2 | 27+3 | 2 | 0 | 0 |
| 18 | MF | (Saudi Arabia) KSA | Hassan Al-Mohammed | 0 | 0 | 0 | 0 | 0 | 0 |
| 28 | MF | (Saudi Arabia) KSA | Mujtaba Al-Shaqaq | 1 | 0 | 0+1 | 0 | 0 | 0 |
| 34 | MF | (Saudi Arabia) KSA | Abdullah Othman | 27 | 6 | 24+2 | 6 | 1 | 0 |
| 39 | MF | (Saudi Arabia) KSA | Nasser Al-Ojail | 28 | 0 | 26+1 | 0 | 1 | 0 |
| 80 | MF | (Saudi Arabia) KSA | Ibrahim Al-Ibrahim | 11 | 0 | 5+5 | 0 | 1 | 0 |
| 88 | MF | (Saudi Arabia) KSA | Eisa Al-Saeed | 20 | 2 | 5+14 | 2 | 0+1 | 0 |
| 90 | MF | (Saudi Arabia) KSA | Khaled Al-Aboud | 18 | 1 | 7+11 | 1 | 0 | 0 |
Forwards
| 11 | FW | (Saudi Arabia) KSA | Hassan Al-Solan | 27 | 6 | 8+18 | 6 | 0+1 | 0 |
| 20 | FW | (Saudi Arabia) KSA | Abdulaziz Al-Mutair | 15 | 0 | 4+11 | 0 | 0 | 0 |
| 29 | FW | (Saudi Arabia) KSA | Yousef Atallah | 4 | 3 | 4 | 3 | 0 | 0 |
| 32 | FW | (Saudi Arabia) KSA | Saleh Al-Arfej | 24 | 3 | 22+2 | 3 | 0 | 0 |
| 70 | FW | (Saudi Arabia) KSA | Faisel Al-Jamaan | 29 | 8 | 26+2 | 7 | 1 | 1 |
| 99 | FW | (Brazil) BRA | Willen | 12 | 4 | 8+4 | 4 | 0 | 0 |
Players sent out on loan this season
| 7 | DF | (Nigeria) NGA | Abdulshakour Hosawi | 4 | 0 | 3+1 | 0 | 0 | 0 |
| | DF | (Saudi Arabia) KSA | Hassan Al-Sandal | 0 | 0 | 0 | 0 | 0 | 0 |

=== Goalscorers ===
Last updated on 18 April 2018.

| Place | Position | Number | Nation | Name | Prince MbS League | King Cup | Total |
|---|---|---|---|---|---|---|---|
| 1 | FW | 70 | (Saudi Arabia) | Faisel Al-Jamaan | 7 | 1 | 8 |
| 2 | FW | 11 | (Saudi Arabia) | Hassan Al-Solan | 6 | 0 | 6 |
| 2 | MF | 34 | (Saudi Arabia) | Abdullah Othman | 6 | 0 | 6 |
| 4 | FW | 99 | (Brazil) | Willen | 4 | 0 | 4 |
| 5 | FW | 29 | (Saudi Arabia) | Yousef Atallah | 3 | 0 | 3 |
| 5 | FW | 32 | (Saudi Arabia) | Saleh Al-Arfej | 3 | 0 | 3 |
| 7 | DF | 8 | (Saudi Arabia) | Abdullah Al-Yousef | 2 | 0 | 2 |
| 7 | MF | 17 | (Saudi Arabia) | Haitham Al-Khulaif | 2 | 0 | 2 |
| 7 | MF | 88 | (Saudi Arabia) | Eisa Al-Saeed | 2 | 0 | 2 |
| 10 | DF | 6 | (Saudi Arabia) | Hamed Al-Sherif | 1 | 0 | 1 |
| 10 | MF | 9 | (Saudi Arabia) | Jehad Al-Zowayed | 1 | 0 | 1 |
| 10 | MF | 14 | (Saudi Arabia) | Abdurahman Al-Huraib | 1 | 0 | 1 |
| 10 | MF | 90 | (Saudi Arabia) | Khaled Al-Aboud | 1 | 0 | 1 |
| Own Goals | | | | | 0 | 0 | 0 |
| Total | | | | | 39 | 1 | 40 |

=== Clean sheets ===
Last updated on 18 April 2018.

| Place | Position | Number | Nation | Name | Prince MbS League | King Cup | Total |
|---|---|---|---|---|---|---|---|
| 1 | GK | 1 | (Saudi Arabia) | Khalid Radhy | 4 | 0 | 4 |
| 2 | GK | 23 | (Saudi Arabia) | Nawaf Al-Otaibi | 3 | 0 | 3 |
| Total | | | | | 7 | 0 | 7 |
