= 2016–17 Hajer Club season =

Hajer
2016–17 season
- Chairman: Sami Al-Melhem
- Manager: Sameer Hilal (until 3 December 2016); Jamal Belhadi (from 18 December 2016 to 1 April 2017); Mohammed Al-Tamry (from 1 April 2017)
- Stadium: Prince Abdullah bin Jalawi Stadium
- First Division: 9th
- King Cup: Round of 16
- Crown Prince Cup: Quarter-finals
- Top goalscorer: League: Abdullah Othman (8); All: Jassem Al-Hamdan; Abdullah Othman (8)
Home colours	Away colours

The 2016–17 season was Hajer's return to the Saudi First Division, having been relegated from the Pro League last season. This season they are participating in the First Division, King Cup and Crown Prince Cup. The season covered the period from 1 July 2016 to 30 June 2017.

== First-team squad ==
As of 31 January 2017

Note: Flags indicate national team as defined under FIFA eligibility rules; some limited exceptions apply. Players may hold more than one non-FIFA nationality.

No.	Pos.	Nation	Player
1	GK	KSA	Khalid Radhy
2	DF	KSA	Radhi Al-Radhi
4	DF	KSA	Hassan Al-Sandal
6	MF	KSA	Haitham Al-Khulaif
7	DF	NGA	Abdulshakour Hosawi
9	FW	KSA	Jassem Al-Hamdan
10	MF	KSA	Abdulhadi Al-Harajin
11	MF	KSA	Hani Al-Dhahi
13	DF	KSA	Mohammed Al-Musained
14	MF	KSA	Abdurahman Al-Huraib (captain)
16	DF	KSA	Hamed Al-Sherif (on loan from Al-Ahli)
17	MF	KSA	Mohammed Al-Safri
20	MF	KSA	Salman Al-Hariri

No.	Pos.	Nation	Player
21	GK	KSA	Mohammed Al-Omran
22	GK	KSA	Nawaf Al-Otaibi
23	GK	KSA	Abdulraouf Al-Daqeel
24	MF	KSA	Mousa Al-Aoufi
26	FW	NGA	Bakr Hawsawi
32	FW	KSA	Saleh Al-Arfej
33	MF	KSA	Sami Abdulghani
34	MF	KSA	Abdullah Othman
35	DF	KSA	Ahmed Al-Nufaili
70	FW	KSA	Faisel Al-Jamaan
73	DF	KSA	Hassan Al-Harbi
77	MF	KSA	Eisa Abdali
80	MF	CMR	Hervé Tchami

=== Out on loan ===
Note: Flags indicate national team as defined under FIFA eligibility rules; some limited exceptions apply. Players may hold more than one non-FIFA nationality.

No.	Pos.	Nation	Player
18	MF	KSA	Abduraheem Al-Debbas (at Al-Jeel until the end of the 2016–17 season)
77	MF	KSA	Riyadh Al-Ibrahim (at Al-Batin until the end of the 2016–2017 season)
99	GK	KSA	Ali Al-Habarah (at Al-Rawdhah until the end of the 2016–17 season)

== Transfers ==
=== In ===
Date from	Position	Nationality	Name	From	Fee	Ref.
13 May 2016	DM	(Saudi Arabia)	Sami Abdulghani	Al-Orubah	Undisclosed	
13 May 2016	CB	(Saudi Arabia)	Hassan Al-Sandal	Al-Orubah	Undisclosed	
2 June 2016	AM	(Saudi Arabia)	Abdullah Othman	Al-Hazm	Undisclosed	
30 June 2016	CM	(Saudi Arabia)	Hani Al-Dhahi	Al-Feiha	Undisclosed	
1 July 2016	FW	(Nigeria)	Bakr Hawsawi	Ohod	Undisclosed	
9 August 2016	RB	(Nigeria)	Abdulshakour Hosawi	Al-Mojzel	Undisclosed	
9 August 2016	CB	(Saudi Arabia)	Hassan Al-Traidi	Al-Nahda	Undisclosed	
9 August 2016	FW	(Saudi Arabia)	Faisel Al-Jamaan	Al-Fateh	Undisclosed	
10 August 2016	MF	(Jordan)	Yousef Al-Thodan	Al-Orubah	Undisclosed	
15 August 2016	GK	(Saudi Arabia)	Nawaf Al-Otaibi	Al-Mojzel	Undisclosed	
15 August 2016	MF	(Saudi Arabia)	Abdulaziz Fallatah	Al-Orubah	Undisclosed	
18 August 2016	CB	(Saudi Arabia)	Ahmed Al-Khater	Al-Nahda	Undisclosed	
15 September 2016	ST	(Guinea)	Naby Soumah	No Club	Free	
21 January 2017	AM	(Saudi Arabia)	Mohammed Al-Safri	No Club	Free	
30 January 2017	RW	(Cameroon)	Hervé Tchami	Feirense	Free	
31 January 2017	AM	(Saudi Arabia)	Mousa Al-Aoufi	Ohod	Undisclosed	

=== Out ===
Date from	Position	Nationality	Name	To	Fee	Ref.
1 July 2016	GK	(Saudi Arabia)	Mustafa Malayekah	Al-Faisaly	Free	
23 June 2016	RB	(Saudi Arabia)	Rashed Al-Raheeb	Al-Khaleej	Free	
1 July 2016	RB	(Saudi Arabia)	Radhi Al-Mutairi	Al-Feiha	Free	
1 July 2016	MF	(Cameroon)	André Ndame Ndame		Released	
1 July 2016	MF	(Saudi Arabia)	Ahmed Krenshi	Al-Qadisiyah	Free	
1 July 2016	FW	(Saudi Arabia)	Mohammed Al-Saiari	Al-Ettifaq	Undisclosed	
11 July 2016	RW	(Saudi Arabia)	Majed Al-Qahtani	Al-Adalh	Free	
12 July 2016	LM	(Saudi Arabia)	Morad Al-Rashidi	Al-Raed	Free	
25 August 2016	CB	(Senegal)	Adama François	Al-Khaleej	Free	
14 December 2016	MF	(Jordan)	Yousef Al-Thodan		Released	
4 January 2017	MF	(Saudi Arabia)	Abdulaziz Fallatah		Released	
4 January 2017	CB	(Saudi Arabia)	Hassan Al-Traidi		Released	
22 January 2017	CB	(Saudi Arabia)	Ahmed Al-Khater		Released	
23 January 2017	AM	(Saudi Arabia)	Osama Al-Khalaf	Al-Ettifaq	Undisclosed	
25 January 2017	ST	(Guinea)	Naby Soumah	Al-Nahda	Undisclosed	
16 March 2017	CB	(Saudi Arabia)	Khaled Al-Barakah		Released	

=== Loans in ===
Date from	Position	Nationality	Name	From	Date Until	Ref.
21 January 2017	CB	(Saudi Arabia)	Hamed Al-Sherif	Al-Ahli	30 June 2017	

=== Loans out ===
Date from	Position	Nationality	Name	To	Date Until	Ref.
18 January 2017	LW	(Saudi Arabia)	Abduraheem Al-Debbas	Al-Jeel	30 June 2017	
24 January 2017	GK	(Saudi Arabia)	Ali Al-Habarah	Al-Rawdhah	30 June 2017	
31 January 2017	AM	(Saudi Arabia)	Riyadh Al-Ibrahim	Al-Batin	30 June 2017	

== Competitions ==
=== Pre-season friendlies ===
3 July 2016 Friendly	Al-Ettifaq	1–2	Hajer	Dammam
21:00 AST	Al-Moqaadi 67'	Report	Al-Khalaf 52'; Al-Hamdan 85'	Stadium: Abdullah Al Dabil Stadium

19 July 2016 Friendly	Libya U23	0–0	Hajer
19:00 AST		Report

23 July 2016 Friendly	ES Tunis	1–1	Hajer	Tunis
19:00 AST	Mejri 16'	Report	Al-Arfej 69'	Stadium: Stade Chedly Zouiten

4 August 2016 Friendly	Al-Shabab	1–0	Hajer	Riyadh
19:25 AST	Benyettou 72'	Report		Stadium: Prince Khalid bin Sultan Stadium

=== First Division ===
==== League table ====
Pos	Team	Pld	W	D	L	GF	GA	GD	Pts	Promotion, qualification or relegation
1	Al-Fayha (C, P)	30	13	11	6	50	35	+15	50	Promotion to Professional League
2	Ohod (P)	30	13	9	8	42	30	+12	48	Promotion to Professional League
3	Najran	30	13	7	10	38	34	+4	46	Qualification to promotion play-offs
4	Al-Nahda	30	12	9	9	37	31	+6	45	
5	Al-Orobah	30	10	11	9	34	32	+2	41	
6	Al-Qaisumah	30	11	8	11	44	50	−6	41	
7	Al-Shoulla	30	11	8	11	35	33	+2	41	
8	Damac	30	9	13	8	33	39	−6	40	
9	Hajer	30	10	10	10	38	36	+2	40	
10	Al-Hazem	30	10	8	12	36	30	+6	38	
11	Al-Watani	30	10	7	13	27	37	−10	37	
12	Al-Nojoom	30	8	13	9	38	37	+1	37	
13	Al-Tai	30	10	7	13	34	42	−8	37	
14	Al-Adalh (R)	30	8	12	10	31	41	−10	36	Relegation to Second Division
15	Al-Jeel (R)	30	8	11	11	45	45	0	35	Relegation to Second Division
16	Wej (R)	30	6	12	12	37	47	−10	30	Relegation to Second Division

Updated to match(es) played on 5 May 2017. Source: Goalzz
Rules for classification: 1) Points; 2) Head-to-head points; 3) Head-to-head goal difference; 4) Total goal difference; 5) Total goals scored; 6) Play-off (only for deciding champion, promotion and relegation).
(C) Champions; (P) Promoted; (R) Relegated

==== Results by matchday ====
Matchday	1	2	3	4	5	6	7	8	9	10	11	12	13	14	15	16	17	18	19	20	21	22	23	24	25	26	27	28	29	30
Ground	A	H	A	H	A	H	A	H	A	H	A	H	A	A	H	H	A	H	A	H	A	H	A	H	A	H	A	H	H	A
Result	W	D	W	D	W	L	W	D	L	W	L	D	L	W	L	D	W	D	D	L	D	W	L	D	D	W	L	L	W	L
Position	4	5	2	2	2	2	2	2	3	3	4	4	4	4	6	6	5	6	5	5	6	5	6	5	7	6	8	9	8	9

Updated to match(es) played on 5 May 2017. Source:
A = Away; H = Home; W = Win; D = Draw; L = Loss

==== Results summary ====
Overall								Home						Away					
Pld	W	D	L	GF	GA	GD	Pts	W	D	L	GF	GA	GD	W	D	L	GF	GA	GD
30	10	10	10	38	36	+2	40	4	7	4	18	17	+1	6	3	6	20	19	+1

Last updated: 5 May 2017.

==== Matches ====
13 August 2016 1	Al-Adalh	0–1	Hajer	Al-Hasa
17:50 AST		Report	Al-Hamdan 15'	Stadium: Prince Abdullah bin Jalawi Stadium; Referee: Sami Al-Jires

19 August 2016 2	Hajer	3–3	Al-Qaisumah	Al-Hasa
17:55 AST	Al-Ibrahim 21' (pen.); Al-Arfej 80'; Al-Hamdan 84'	Report	Masrahi 9'; Al-Shammeri 15', 44'	Stadium: Prince Abdullah bin Jalawi Stadium

18 September 2016 3	Al-Hazm	0–2	Hajer	Ar Rass
17:50 AST		Report	Al-Hamdan 39' (pen.); Othman 59'	Stadium: Al Hazm Club Stadium

22 September 2016 4	Hajer	0–0	Al-Nojoom	Al-Hasa
17:20 AST	Al-Huraib (yellow card) 53'; Al-Sandal (yellow card) 90'	Report	Adamo (yellow card) 21'; Al-Harbi (yellow card) 66'; Majrashi (yellow card) 90'	Stadium: Prince Abdullah bin Jalawi Stadium

2 October 2016 5	Al-Watani	1–4	Hajer	Tabuk
18:00 AST	Khalil (red card) 77'; Kolawole 89'		Soumah 37', 83'; Al-Dhahi 51' (pen.); Al-Ibrahim 87'	Stadium: King Khalid Sport City Stadium

13 October 2016 6	Hajer	0–2	Ohod	Al-Hasa
17:00 AST		Report	Al-Dhaw 69'; Toure 89'	Stadium: Prince Abdullah bin Jalawi Stadium

20 October 2016 7	Al-Feiha	0–3	Hajer	Al Majma'ah
15:25 AST		Report	Al-Jamaan 13'; Al-Khater 22'; Soumah (red card) 60'; Al-Thodan 90'	Stadium: King Salman Sport City Stadium

28 October 2016 8	Hajer	1–1	Al-Tai	Al-Hasa
17:45 AST	Othman 3'; Al-Huraib (yellow card) 73'	Report	Galán (yellow card) 43'; Al-Sabah 54'; Al-Shammeri (yellow card) 70'; Marzouq (yellow card) 90+3'	Stadium: Prince Abdullah bin Jalawi Stadium; Referee: Hussein Abu Shahin

4 November 2016 9	Al-Shoulla	1–0	Hajer	Al-Kharj
15:15 AST	Ilunga 22'			Stadium: Al-Shoulla Club Stadium; Referee: Abdulrahman Al Malki

17 November 2016 10	Hajer	2–0	Al-Jeel	Al-Hasa
17:30 AST	Al-Ibrahim 17'; Al-Hamdan 64'	Report		Stadium: Prince Abdullah bin Jalawi Stadium

25 November 2016 11	Damac	2–0	Hajer	Abha
15:30 AST	Hazzam 17'; Eisa 87'	Report		Stadium: Prince Sultan bin Abdul Aziz Stadium

2 December 2016 12	Hajer	1–1	Al-Orubah	Al-Hasa
14:45 AST	Soumah 53'	Report	Cortez 28' (pen.)	Stadium: Prince Abdullah bin Jalawi Stadium; Referee: Abdulrahman Al Malki

9 December 2016 13	Al-Nahda	1–0	Hajer	Dammam
15:05 AST	Al-Khamees 35'	Report		Stadium: Prince Fahad bin Salman Stadium

16 December 2016 14	Wej	1–2	Hajer	Ta'if
15:45 AST	Voinea 45'		Othman 53'; Soumah 79'	Stadium: King Fahd Stadium

22 December 2016 15	Hajer	1–2	Najran	Al-Hasa
15:00 AST	Al-Sandal (yellow card) 79'; Hawsawi 84'	Report	Al-Mansor 23', (yellow card) 49'; Majrashi (yellow card) 58'; Shenqeeti 63'	Stadium: Prince Abdullah bin Jalawi Stadium; Referee: Abdullah Al Nuhait

31 December 2016 16	Hajer	0–0	Al-Adalh	Al-Hasa
15:05 AST		Report		Stadium: Prince Abdullah bin Jalawi Stadium

6 January 2017 17	Al-Qaisumah	2–3	Hajer	Hafar al-Batin
15:15 AST	Khalaf 5'; Al-Mutairi 60'	Report	Othman 7'; Al-Huraib 36'; Al-Hariri 39'	Stadium: Al-Batin Club Stadium; Referee: Sami Al Jires

28 January 2017 18	Hajer	0–0	Al-Hazm	Al-Hasa
15:20 AST	Al-Barakah (yellow card) 25'	Report	Barnawi (red card) 45'; Musallami (yellow card) 90'; Al-Hamdan (yellow card) 90'	Stadium: Prince Abdullah bin Jalawi Stadium; Referee: Mohammed Al Buraidy

3 February 2017 19	Al-Nojoom	1–1	Hajer	Al-Hasa
15:25 AST	Al-Saeed 67'	Report	Al-Jamaan 90+6'	Stadium: Prince Abdullah bin Jalawi Stadium

10 February 2017 20	Hajer	0–1	Al-Watani	Al-Hasa
14:30 AST		Report	Al-Mubarki 26'	Stadium: Prince Abdullah bin Jalawi Stadium; Referee: Majed Al-Shamrani

16 February 2017 21	Ohod	1–1	Hajer	Medina
16:10 AST	Al-Subaie 50'	Report	Al-Subaie 16' (o.g.)	Stadium: Prince Mohammed bin Abdul Aziz Stadium; Referee: Mishari Al-Mishari

3 March 2017 22	Hajer	3–1	Al-Feiha	Al-Hasa
15:35 AST	Othman 4', 43'; Al-Aoufi 45+2'	Report	Al-Menqash 29' (pen.)	Stadium: Prince Abdullah bin Jalawi Stadium

10 March 2017 23	Al-Tai	1–0	Hajer	Ha'il
16:05 AST	Al-Shammeri 87'			Stadium: Prince Abdul Aziz bin Musa'ed Stadium

18 March 2017 24	Hajer	2–2	Al-Shoulla	Al-Hasa
18:30 AST	Al-Harbi 46'; Hawsawi 85'	Report	Al-Munaif 37' (pen.); Ilunga 83'	Stadium: Prince Abdullah bin Jalawi Stadium; Referee: Mishari Al-Mishari

31 March 2017 25	Al-Jeel	2–2	Hajer	Al-Hasa
15:35 AST	Douglas 31', 82' (pen.)	Report	Al-Harbi 41'; Al-Hamdan 90+2'	Stadium: Prince Abdullah bin Jalawi Stadium

7 April 2017 26	Hajer	2–1	Damac	Al-Hasa
15:35 AST	Al-Hamdan 1'; Al-Huraib 90+3' (pen.)	Report	Ali Al-Aliany 63'	Stadium: Prince Abdullah bin Jalawi Stadium; Referee: Mishari Al-Mishari

14 April 2017 27	Al-Orobah	3–0	Hajer	Sakakah
16:15 AST	Ba Adheem 32'; Al-Joni 48'; Al-Khaibari 88'			Stadium: Al-Orobah Club Stadium

20 April 2017 28	Hajer	1–2	Al-Nahda	Al-Hasa
18:50 AST	Al-Hamdan 64'	Report	Soumah 49', 77'	Stadium: Prince Abdullah bin Jalawi Stadium; Referee: Faisal Al-Balawi

27 April 2017 29	Hajer	2–1	Wej	Al-Hasa
15:30 AST	Othman 58', 63'	Report	Al-Boqami 47'	Stadium: Prince Abdullah bin Jalawi Stadium; Referee: Mohammed Al Nuhait

5 May 2017 30	Najran	3–1	Hajer	Abha
20:45 AST	Al-Mansor 39', 43'; Shenqeeti 90+1'		Hawsawi 5'	Stadium: Prince Sultan Sport City Stadium; Referee: Faisal Al-Balawi

=== King Cup ===
19 January 2017 Round of 32	Hajer	2–1	Al-Orobah	Al-Ahsa
15:20 AST	Al-Hamdan 1'; Al-Otaibi (yellow card) 14'; Al-Khalaf 45+2'	Report	Al-Johani (yellow card) 7'; Al-Joni (yellow card) 63', (goal) 76'	Stadium: Prince Abdullah bin Jalawi Stadium; Referee: Faisal Al-Balawi

24 February 2017 Round of 16	Wej	3–1	Hajer	Ta'if
16:15 AST	Al-Boqami (yellow card) 25'; Voinea 43'; Al-Qarni 65'; Al-Boqami 73'; Al-Towairqi (yellow card) 82'; Hussain (yellow card) 86'	Report	Al-Musained 16'	Stadium: King Fahd Stadium; Referee: Sami Al-Jires

=== Crown Prince Cup ===
25 August 2016 Round of 32	Hajer	3–3 (a.e.t.) (4–2 p)	Damac	Al-Hasa
18:50 AST	Al-Huraib (yellow card) 24'; Al-Harajin (yellow card) 59'; Ali 66' (o.g.); Al-Sandal (yellow card) 83'; Al-Arfej 92', (yellow card) 105'; Al-Ibrahim 94'	Report	Sharahili (yellow card) 10' (yellow-red card) 85'; Suanon 78', 107'; Eisa 105'; Ilias (yellow card) 117'	Stadium: Prince Abdullah bin Jalawi Stadium; Referee: Fahad Al-Oraini
	Penalties
	Al-Thodan (penalty scored); Al-Huraib (penalty missed); Al-Traidi (penalty scored); Al-Khalaf (penalty scored); Al-Ibrahim (penalty scored)		(penalty scored) Suanon; (penalty missed) Eisa; (penalty missed) Ilias; (penalty scored) Al-Ahmad

28 September 2016 Round of 16	Hajer	1–0	Al-Fateh	Al-Hasa
18:15 AST	Al-Dhahi (yellow card) 41'; Soumah 55'; Al-Harajin (yellow card) 90'	Report	Al-Bulaihi (yellow card) 24' (yellow-red card) 90+6'; Al-Fuhaid (yellow card) 60'; Al-Owaishir (yellow card) 89'	Stadium: Prince Abdullah bin Jalawi Stadium; Referee: Abdullah Al-Awedan

25 October 2016 Quarter-finals	Hajer	1–6	Al-Ahli	Al-Hasa
17:45 AST	Al-Nufaili (yellow card) 42'; Al-Radhi (yellow card) 52'; Soumah 73'		Al-Otaibi 18' (o.g.); Al-Somah 23', 36', 39'; Hawsawi 53' (pen.); Assiri 69'	Stadium: Prince Abdullah bin Jalawi Stadium; Attendance: 1,459; Referee: Mohammed Al-Nuhait

== Statistics ==
=== Appearances and goals ===
As of 5 May 2017

No.	Pos	Nat	Player	Total		First Division		Crown Prince Cup		King Cup	
No.	Pos	Nat	Player	Apps	Goals	Apps	Goals	Apps	Goals	Apps	Goals
Goalkeepers
1	GK	(Saudi Arabia) KSA	Khalid Radhy	28	0	28	0	0	0	0	0
21	GK	(Saudi Arabia) KSA	Mohammed Al-Omran	0	0	0	0	0	0	0	0
22	GK	(Saudi Arabia) KSA	Nawaf Al-Otaibi	7	0	2	0	3	0	2	0
23	GK	(Saudi Arabia) KSA	Abdulraouf Al-Daqeel	0	0	0	0	0	0	0	0
Defenders
2	DF	(Saudi Arabia) KSA	Radhi Al-Radhi	7	0	5+1	0	1	0	0	0
4	DF	(Saudi Arabia) KSA	Hassan Al-Sandal	14	0	11+1	0	2	0	0	0
7	DF	(Nigeria) NGA	Abdulshakour Hosawi	31	1	26+1	1	2	0	1+1	0
13	DF	(Saudi Arabia) KSA	Mohammed Al-Musained	7	1	4	0	1	0	1+1	1
15	DF	(Saudi Arabia) KSA	Khaled Al-Barakah	12	0	10	0	1	0	1	0
16	DF	(Saudi Arabia) KSA	Hamed Al-Sherif	13	0	12	0	0	0	1	0
35	DF	(Saudi Arabia) KSA	Ahmed Al-Nufaili	22	0	18+1	0	2	0	1	0
73	DF	(Saudi Arabia) KSA	Hassan Al-Harbi	23	2	21	2	0	0	2	0
Midfielders
6	MF	(Saudi Arabia) KSA	Haitham Al-Khulaif	9	0	9	0	0	0	0	0
10	MF	(Saudi Arabia) KSA	Abdulhadi Al-Harajin	20	0	9+8	0	1+1	0	0+1	0
11	MF	(Saudi Arabia) KSA	Hani Al-Dhahi	19	1	12+5	1	2	0	0	0
14	MF	(Saudi Arabia) KSA	Abdurahman Al-Huraib	26	2	20+2	2	2	0	2	0
17	MF	(Saudi Arabia) KSA	Mohammed Al-Safri	2	0	1	0	0	0	1	0
20	MF	(Saudi Arabia) KSA	Salman Al-Hariri	14	1	6+6	1	1	0	1	0
24	MF	(Saudi Arabia) KSA	Mousa Al-Aoufi	13	1	9+3	1	0	0	1	0
33	MF	(Saudi Arabia) KSA	Sami Abdulghani	12	0	3+6	0	0+2	0	1	0
34	MF	(Saudi Arabia) KSA	Abdullah Othman	28	8	24+1	8	2	0	0+1	0
77	MF	(Saudi Arabia) KSA	Eisa Abdali	1	0	0+1	0	0	0	0	0
80	MF	(Saudi Arabia) KSA	Nasser Al-Ojail	1	0	0+1	0	0	0	0	0
80	MF	(Cameroon) CMR	Hervé Tchami	8	0	4+3	0	0	0	1	0
Forwards
9	FW	(Saudi Arabia) KSA	Jassem Al-Hamdan	32	8	19+9	7	1+1	0	2	1
26	FW	(Nigeria) NGA	Bakr Hawsawi	10	2	4+6	2	0	0	0	0
32	FW	(Saudi Arabia) KSA	Saleh Al-Arfej	19	2	2+13	1	1+1	1	1+1	0
70	FW	(Saudi Arabia) KSA	Faisel Al-Jamaan	24	2	9+12	2	1+1	0	0+1	0
Players sent out on loan this season
18	MF	(Saudi Arabia) KSA	Abduraheem Al-Debbas	0	0	0	0	0	0	0	0
77	MF	(Saudi Arabia) KSA	Riyadh Al-Ibrahim	14	4	11+1	3	0+1	1	1	0
99	GK	(Saudi Arabia) KSA	Ali Al-Habarah	0	0	0	0	0	0	0	0
Player who made an appearance this season but have left the club
5	DF	(Saudi Arabia) KSA	Hassan Al-Traidi	10	0	7	0	2+1	0	0	0
6	MF	(Saudi Arabia) KSA	Osama Al-Khalaf	11	1	8+1	0	1	0	1	1
14	MF	(Jordan) JOR	Yousef Al-Thodan	10	1	9+1	1	0	0	0	0
16	FW	(Guinea) GUI	Naby Soumah	14	6	11	4	2	2	1	0
24	DF	(Saudi Arabia) KSA	Ahmed Al-Khater	8	1	7	1	1	0	0	0
80	MF	(Saudi Arabia) KSA	Abdulaziz Fallatah	13	0	7+5	0	1	0	0	0

=== Goalscorers ===
Last updated on 5 May 2017.

Place	Position	Number	Nation	Name	First Division	Crown Prince Cup	King Cup	Total
1	FW	9	(Saudi Arabia)	Jassem Al-Hamdan	7	0	1	8
1	MF	34	(Saudi Arabia)	Abdullah Othman	8	0	0	8
3	FW	16	(Guinea)	Naby Soumah	4	2	0	6
4	MF	77	(Saudi Arabia)	Riyadh Al-Ibrahim	3	1	0	4
5	MF	14	(Saudi Arabia)	Abdurahman Al-Huraib	2	0	0	2
5	FW	26	(Nigeria)	Bakr Hawsawi	2	0	0	2
5	FW	32	(Saudi Arabia)	Saleh Al-Arfej	1	1	0	2
5	FW	70	(Saudi Arabia)	Faisel Al-Jamaan	2	0	0	2
5	DF	73	(Saudi Arabia)	Hassan Al Harbi	2	0	0	2
9	MF	6	(Saudi Arabia)	Osama Al-Khalaf	0	0	1	1
9	DF	7	(Nigeria)	Abdulshakour Hosawi	1	0	0	1
9	MF	11	(Saudi Arabia)	Hani Al-Dhahi	1	0	0	1
9	DF	13	(Saudi Arabia)	Mohammed Al-Musained	0	0	1	1
9	MF	14	(Jordan)	Yousef Al-Thodan	1	0	0	1
9	MF	20	(Saudi Arabia)	Salman Al-Hariri	1	0	0	1
9	DF	24	(Saudi Arabia)	Ahmed Al-Khater	1	0	0	1
9	MF	24	(Saudi Arabia)	Mousa Al-Aoufi	1	0	0	1
Own goals					1	1	0	2
TOTALS					38	5	3	46
