= 2018–19 Hajer Club season =

Hajer
2018–19 season
- Chairman: Hamad Al-Arifi
- Manager: Abdullah Al-Janoubi (until 6 February); Mohammed Al-Moalej (from 13 February)
- Stadium: Prince Abdullah bin Jalawi Stadium
- MS League: 18th (relegated)
- King Cup: Round of 32 (knocked out by Al-Hilal)
- Top goalscorer: League: Faisel Al-Jamaan (12 goals); All: Faisel Al-Jamaan (12 goals)
Home colours	Away colours
- All statistics correct as of 15 May 2019.

The 2018–19 season was Hajer's third consecutive season in the Prince Mohammad bin Salman League following their relegation from the Professional League during the 2015–16 season, it was also their 68th year in existence. Along with competing in the MS League, the club also participated in the King Cup. The season covers the period from 1 July 2018 to 30 June 2019.

== First-team squad ==
As of 1 September 2018

Note: Flags indicate national team as defined under FIFA eligibility rules; some limited exceptions apply. Players may hold more than one non-FIFA nationality.

No.	Pos.	Nation	Player
3	DF	NGR	Gege Soriola
4	DF	KSA	Hassan Al-Sandal
5	MF	KSA	Sami Abdulghani
6	MF	KSA	Abdulaziz Al-Shuhaib
7	MF	TUN	Ahmed Hosni
8	DF	KSA	Abdullah Al-Yousef
9	MF	BRA	Rayllan
10	MF	KSA	Jehad Al-Zowayed
11	MF	KSA	Hassan Al-Solan
12	DF	KSA	Ali Al-Maani
13	DF	KSA	Saud Fallatah
14	MF	KSA	Abdurahman Al-Huraib (captain)
16	MF	KSA	Mahmoud Bu Hassan
17	MF	KSA	Haitham Al-Khulaif
18	MF	NGR	Djebril Mohammed

No.	Pos.	Nation	Player
19	FW	SEN	Waliou Ndoye
22	GK	KSA	Abdulraouf Al-Daqeel
23	GK	KSA	Nawaf Al-Otaibi
25	GK	IRQ	Noor Sabri
27	MF	KSA	Hassan Al-Mohammed
32	DF	KSA	Hamad Al-Jizani
33	GK	KSA	Radhi Al-Olaiwi
47	DF	KSA	Nasser Al-Ojail
48	MF	KSA	Abdullah Othman
70	FW	KSA	Faisel Al-Jamaan
73	DF	KSA	Hassan Al-Harbi
77	FW	KSA	Abdulaziz Al-Mutair
88	MF	MTN	Alassane Diop
99	FW	GHA	Robert Ghansah

== Transfers ==
=== In ===
Date	Pos.	Name	Previous club	Fee	Source
19 June 2018	DF	(Nigeria) Gege Soriola	(Bahrain) Al-Malkiya	Free	
21 June 2018	MF	(Tunisia) Ahmed Hosni	(Tunisia) Stade Tunisien	Free	
24 June 2018	GK	(Iraq) Noor Sabri	(Iraq) Naft Al-Wasat	Undisclosed	
4 July 2018	DF	(Saudi Arabia) Hamad Al-Jizani	(Saudi Arabia) Al-Qadsiah	Free	
4 July 2018	DF	(Saudi Arabia) Saud Fallatah	(Saudi Arabia) Al-Nojoom	Free	
13 July 2018	FW	(Ghana) Robert Ghansah	(Oman) Al-Shabab	Free	
14 July 2018	MF	(Nigeria) Djebril Mohammed	(Saudi Arabia) Al-Nojoom	Free	
30 July 2018	MF	(Brazil) Rayllan	(Brazil) Juazeiro	Free	
22 August 2018	MF	(Mauritania) Alassane Diop	(Mauritania) Nouadhibou	Free	
23 August 2018	FW	(Senegal) Waliou Ndoye	(Tunisia) Sfaxien	Free	
19 January 2019	MF	(Brazil) Diego Barboza	(Saudi Arabia) Al-Qaisumah	Free	
19 January 2019	FW	(Saudi Arabia) Rashed Al-Salem	(Saudi Arabia) Al-Hilal	Free	
27 January 2019	FW	(Poland) Łukasz Gikiewicz	(Saudi Arabia) Al-Batin	Free	

=== Out ===
Date	Pos.	Name	New club	Fee	Source
1 June 2018	DF	(Saudi Arabia) Mohammed Al-Mohanna	Released	Free	
1 June 2018	DF	(Saudi Arabia) Safwan Hawsawi	Released	Free	
1 June 2018	MF	(Saudi Arabia) Ibrahim Al-Ibrahim	Released	Free	
1 June 2018	FW	(Saudi Arabia) Saleh Al-Arfej	Released	Free	
1 June 2018	FW	(Brazil) Willen	Released	Free	
19 June 2018	DF	(Nigeria) Abdulshakour Hosawi	(Saudi Arabia) Al-Nojoom	Free	
22 July 2018	DF	(Saudi Arabia) Radhi Al-Radhi	(Saudi Arabia) Al-Adalh	Free	
27 July 2018	MF	(Saudi Arabia) Abdulhadi Al-Harajin	(Saudi Arabia) Al-Jabalain	Free	
14 August 2018	DF	(Tunisia) Mohamed Houssem Slimene	(Saudi Arabia) Abha	Free	
16 August 2018	DF	(Saudi Arabia) Mohammed Al-Musained	Released	Free	
16 August 2018	MF	(Saudi Arabia) Abduraheem Al-Debbas	Released	Free	
16 August 2018	MF	(Saudi Arabia) Khaled Al-Aboud	(Saudi Arabia) Al-Muzahimiyyah	Free	
17 August 2018	MF	(Saudi Arabia) Eisa Al-Saeed	(Saudi Arabia) Al-Nojoom	Free	
10 September 2018	GK	(Saudi Arabia) Khalid Radhy	(Saudi Arabia) Al-Sadd	Free	
12 September 2018	DF	(Saudi Arabia) Jaafer Al-Saeed	(Saudi Arabia) Al-Sharq	Free	
18 October 2018	FW	(Saudi Arabia) Yousef Atallah	(Saudi Arabia) Al-Bukayriyah	Free	
31 December 2018	DF	(Saudi Arabia) Ahmed Al-Nufaili	(Saudi Arabia) Al-Ain	Free	
23 January 2019	MF	(Tunisia) Ahmed Hosni	Released	Free	
21 April 2019	GK	(Iraq) Noor Sabri	Released	Free	

== Pre-season friendlies ==
24 July 2018 Friendly	Hajer (Saudi Arabia)	1–2	(Saudi Arabia) Al-Adalh	Al-Hasa, Saudi Arabia
19:15 AST	Al-Ghlab 7'	Report	Al-Majhad 78'; Fouzai 90'	Stadium: Hajer Club Stadium

5 August 2018 Friendly	Pharco (Egypt)	2–2	(Saudi Arabia) Hajer	Alexandria, Egypt
18:15 EET	(pen.) (pen.)	Report	Al-Jamaan 38'; Al-Solan 85'	Stadium: Alexandria Stadium

11 August 2018 Friendly	Olympic (Egypt)	3–2	(Saudi Arabia) Hajer	Alexandria, Egypt
16:55 EET	14'; 35'; 45' (pen.)	Report	Al-Khulaif 40'; Al-Mutair 89'	Stadium: Ezzedin Yacoub Stadium

15 August 2018 Friendly	Al Ahly (Egypt)	2–1	(Saudi Arabia) Hajer	Alexandria, Egypt
16:55 EET	32'; 45'	Report	Al-Mutair 30'	Stadium: Borg El Arab Stadium

18 August 2018 Friendly	Smouha (Egypt)	2–2	(Saudi Arabia) Hajer	Alexandria, Egypt
17:00 EET	Oukri 32'; Mekky 88' (pen.)	Report	Al-Yousef 16'; Othman 17'	Stadium: Smouha Club Stadium

== Competitions ==
=== Prince Mohammad bin Salman League ===
==== League table ====
Pos	Team	Pld	W	D	L	GF	GA	GD	Pts	Promotion, qualification or relegation
1	Abha (C, P)	38	19	12	7	52	38	+14	69	Promotion to Pro League
2	Damac (P)	38	16	16	6	52	31	+21	64	Promotion to Pro League
3	Al-Adalah (P)	38	18	9	11	49	39	+10	63	Promotion to Pro League
4	Al-Khaleej (Q)	38	15	15	8	49	39	+10	60	Qualification for the Promotion play-offs
5	Al-Jeel	38	16	9	13	52	44	+8	57 (Note: Al-Jeel finished ahead of Al-Tai on head-to-head goal difference: Al-Jeel 2–0 Al-Tai, Al-Tai 1–0 Al-Jeel.)	
6	Al-Tai	38	15	12	11	39	34	+5	57	
7	Najran	38	13	13	12	47	43	+4	52	
8	Jeddah	38	11	17	10	46	43	+3	50 (Note: Jeddah finished ahead of Al-Nojoom on overall goal difference: Jeddah +3, Al-Nojoom +2 (Jeddah 1–1 Al-Nojoom, Al-Nojoom 2–2 Jeddah).)	
9	Al-Nojoom	38	11	17	10	46	44	+2	50	
10	Al-Nahda	38	14	7	17	41	42	−1	49 (Note: Al-Nahda finished ahead of Al-Ain on overall goal difference: Al-Nahda −1, Al-Ain −2 (Al-Nahda 2–1 Al-Ain, Al-Ain 2–1 Al-Nahda).)	
11	Al-Ain	38	12	13	13	43	45	−2	49	
12	Al-Shoulla	38	13	9	16	42	46	−4	48 (Note: Head-to-head points: Al-Shoulla 13, Al-Kawkab 12, Al-Mujazzal 7, Al-Jabalain 2 (Al-Shoulla 2–1 Al-Kawkab, Al-Kawkab 3–2 Al-Shoulla, Al-Shoulla 2–0 Al-Mujazzal, Al-Mujazzal 1–2 Al-Shoulla, Al-Shoulla 0–0 Al-Jabalain, Al-Jabalain 1–3 Al-Shoulla, Al-Kawkab 2–1 Al-Mujazzal, Al-Mujazzal 2–1 Al-Kawkab, Al-Kawkab 1–0 Al-Jabalain, Al-Jabalain 1–2 Al-Kawkab, Al-Mujazzal 1–0 Al-Jabalain, Al-Jabalain 0–0 Al-Mujazzal).)	
13	Al-Kawkab	38	13	9	16	45	52	−7	48	
14	Al-Mujazzal	38	12	12	14	41	45	−4	48	
15	Al-Jabalain	38	11	15	12	35	40	−5	48	
16	Al-Ansar	38	12	11	15	39	41	−2	47 (Note: Head-to-head points: Al-Ansar 8, Al-Qaisumah 4, Hajer 3 (Al-Ansar 4–1 Al-Qaisumah, Al-Qaisumah 0–2 Al-Ansar, Al-Ansar 1–1 Hajer, Hajer 2–2 Al-Ansar, Al-Qaisumah 2–1 Hajer, Hajer 0–0 Al-Qaisumah).)	
17	Al-Qaisumah (R)	38	13	8	17	46	53	−7	47	Relegation to the Second Division
18	Hajer (R)	38	11	14	13	39	42	−3	47	Relegation to the Second Division
19	Al-Washm (R)	38	12	7	19	35	51	−16	43	Relegation to the Second Division
20	Al-Orobah (R)	38	5	11	22	37	63	−26	26	Relegation to the Second Division

Updated to match(es) played on 15 May 2019. Source: kooora.com
Rules for classification: 1) Points; 2) Head-to-head points; 3) Head-to-head goal difference; 4) Total goal difference; 5) Total goals scored; 6) Play-off (only for deciding champion, promotion and relegation).
(C) Champions; (P) Promoted; (Q) Qualified for the phase indicated; (R) Relegated

==== Results summary ====
Overall								Home						Away					
Pld	W	D	L	GF	GA	GD	Pts	W	D	L	GF	GA	GD	W	D	L	GF	GA	GD
38	11	14	13	39	42	−3	47	5	6	8	16	20	−4	6	8	5	23	22	+1

Last updated: 16 May 2019.

==== Results by matchday ====
Matchday	1	2	3	4	5	6	7	8	9	10	11	12	13	14	15	16	17	18	19	20	21	22	23	24	25	26	27	28	29	30	31	32	33	34	35	36	37	38
Ground	A	H	A	H	A	H	A	A	A	H	A	H	H	H	A	A	H	A	H	H	A	H	A	H	A	H	H	H	A	H	A	A	A	H	H	A	H	A
Result	D	W	W	W	D	D	W	D	D	D	D	W	D	L	L	D	L	W	W	L	L	L	L	L	W	D	D	L	W	W	D	L	L	L	D	D	L	W
Position	8	4	2	1	1	4	2	2	3	4	4	2	2	3	5	5	6	6	4	5	5	6	11	14	11	12	12	15	12	10	9	12	13	14	15	16	18	18

Updated to match(es) played on 16 May 2019. Source:
A = Away; H = Home; W = Win; D = Draw; L = Loss

==== Matches ====
All times are local, AST (UTC+3).

Win Draw Loss Postponed

28 August 2018 1	Al-Adalh	1–1	Hajer	Al-Hasa
18:45	Yao 88'	Report	Al-Jamaan 11' (pen.)	Stadium: Prince Abdullah bin Jalawi Stadium; Referee: Majed Al-Shamrani

4 September 2018 2	Hajer	2–0	Abha	Al-Hasa
18:40	Al-Jamaan 66'; Othman 90+3'	Report		Stadium: Prince Abdullah bin Jalawi Stadium; Referee: Raed Al-Zahrani

11 September 2018 3	Al-Jeel	0–3	Hajer	Al-Hasa
18:30		Report	Diop 16'; Al-Yousef 35'; Al-Jamaan 86' (pen.)	Stadium: Prince Abdullah bin Jalawi Stadium; Referee: Abdulrahman Al-Shehri

18 September 2018 4	Hajer	2–0	Al-Mujazzal	Al-Hasa
18:40	Hosni 57'; Al-Jamaan 90+4'	Report		Stadium: Prince Abdullah bin Jalawi Stadium; Referee: Hussein Abo Shaheen

26 September 2018 5	Al-Washm	1–1	Hajer	Shaqra
18:30	Bakaki 46'	Report	Al-Jamaan 48'	Stadium: Al-Washm Club Stadium; Referee: Abdullah Al-Awidan

2 October 2018 6	Hajer	1–1	Al-Orobah	Al-Hasa
18:05	Al-Jamaan 62' (pen.)	Report	Pato 74' (pen.)	Stadium: Prince Abdullah bin Jalawi Stadium; Referee: Khaled Salwi

10 October 2018 7	Al-Shoulla	0–2	Hajer	Al-Kharj
18:10		Report	Soriola 17'; Othman 73'	Stadium: Al-Shoulla Club Stadium; Referee: Khaled Al-Teris

17 October 2018 8	Al-Jabalain	0–0	Hajer	Ha'il
18:25		Report		Stadium: Prince Abdul Aziz bin Musa'ed Stadium; Referee: Hussein Abo Shaheen

24 October 2018 9	Jeddah	1–1	Hajer	Jeddah
18:30	Alhaj 27'	Report	Al-Yousef 31'	Stadium: Reserve Stadium in King Abdullah Sports City; Referee: Faisal Al-Balawi

30 October 2018 10	Hajer	0–0	Al-Nahda	Al-Hasa
17:40		Report		Stadium: Al-Fateh Club Stadium; Referee: Majed Al-Shamrani

6 November 2018 11	Al-Nojoom	1–1	Hajer	Al-Hasa
18:20	Al-Harbi 66'	Report	Hosni 35'	Stadium: Prince Abdullah bin Jalawi Stadium; Referee: Mohammed Al-Buraidi

13 November 2018 12	Hajer	1–0	Najran	Al-Hasa
17:40	Al-Jamaan 84'	Report		Stadium: Prince Abdullah bin Jalawi Stadium; Referee: Khaled Al-Teris

20 November 2018 13	Hajer	0–0	Al-Qaisumah	Al-Hasa
17:35		Report		Stadium: Prince Abdullah bin Jalawi Stadium; Referee: Raed Al-Zahrani

27 November 2018 14	Hajer	0–1	Al-Khaleej	Al-Hasa
17:30		Report	Al-Sheikh 56'	Stadium: Prince Abdullah bin Jalawi Stadium; Referee: Sultan Al-Harbi

4 December 2018 15	Damac	2–1	Hajer	Khamis Mushait
15:30	Pyagbara 20'; Suanon 90+4'	Report	Al-Yousef 83'	Stadium: Damac Club Stadium; Referee: Sami Al-Jires

12 December 2018 16	Al-Ansar	1–1	Hajer	Medina
15:35	Hassan 37'	Report	Ndoye 86'	Stadium: Al-Ansar Club Stadium; Referee: Turki Al-Khudair

18 December 2018 17	Hajer	0–1	Al-Kawkab	Al-Hasa
17:35		Report	Diouf 22'	Stadium: Prince Abdullah bin Jalawi Stadium; Referee: Abdullah Al-Shehri

25 December 2018 18	Al-Tai	1–2	Hajer	Ha'il
15:30	Al-Ruzaiqi 77' (pen.)	Report	Ndoye 37' (pen.); Al-Yousef 69' (pen.)	Stadium: Prince Abdul Aziz bin Musa'ed Stadium; Referee: Turki Al-Khudair

30 December 2018 19	Hajer	1–0	Al-Ain	Al-Hasa
17:40	Al-Mutair 6'	Report		Stadium: Prince Abdullah bin Jalawi Stadium; Referee: Raed Al-Zahrani

9 January 2019 20	Hajer	0–1	Al-Adalh	Al-Hasa
17:40		Report	Andria 38'	Stadium: Prince Abdullah bin Jalawi Stadium; Referee: Sultan Al-Harbi

26 January 2019 22	Hajer	2–3	Al-Jeel	Al-Hasa
18:00	Al-Mutair 5'; Rayllan 68'	Report	Jose Anderson 15' (pen.); Omar 22'; Morotó 39'	Stadium: Prince Abdullah bin Jalawi Stadium; Referee: Mohammed Al-Buraidi

30 January 2019 21	Abha	2–1	Hajer	Abha
15:55	Al-Nabet 53'; Al-Zylaeei 90+2'		Al-Yousef 90+5'	Stadium: Prince Sultan bin Abdul Aziz Stadium; Referee: Ahmed Al-Remeikhany

5 February 2019 23	Al-Mujazzal	4–0	Hajer	Al Majma'ah
15:45	Al-Obaid 61'; Al-Dossari 75'; Machado 83'; Nahimana 85'			Stadium: King Salman Sport City Stadium; Referee: Ibrahim Al-Aseel

13 February 2019 24	Hajer	0–2	Al-Washm	Al-Hasa
18:15		Report	Al-Shenqeeti 16'; Al-Alameen 79'	Stadium: Prince Abdullah bin Jalawi Stadium; Referee: Abdullah Al-Awidan

19 February 2019 25	Al-Orobah	0–1	Hajer	Sakakah
16:10		Report	Gikiewicz 90+3'	Stadium: Al-Orobah Club Stadium; Referee: Abdullah Dhafer

26 February 2019 26	Hajer	1–1	Al-Shoulla	Al-Hasa
18:20	Othman 66'	Report	Moukoro 36'	Stadium: Prince Abdullah bin Jalawi Stadium; Referee: Khaled Salwi

5 March 2019 27	Hajer	0–0	Al-Jabalain	Al-Hasa
18:25		Report		Stadium: Prince Abdullah bin Jalawi Stadium; Referee: Sami Al-Jires

12 March 2019 28	Hajer	0–3	Jeddah	Al-Hasa
18:30		Report	Zoe 20'; Kaina 58'; Thiago 62'	Stadium: Hajer Club Stadium; Referee: Turki Al-Khudair

20 March 2019 29	Al-Nahda	0–1	Hajer	Dammam
18:30		Report	Zadi 35' (o.g.)	Stadium: Prince Mohamed bin Fahd Stadium; Referee: Mohammed Abo Shaqarah

27 March 2019 30	Hajer	2–1	Al-Nojoom	Al-Hasa
18:35	Al-Jamaan 20', 62'	Report	Kouao 90+2'	Stadium: Hajer Club Stadium; Referee: Mohammed Al-Amri

2 April 2019 31	Najran	1–1	Hajer	Najran
16:00	Al Abbas 57'	Report	Al-Harbi 32'	Stadium: Najran University Stadium; Referee: Turki Al-Hashlan

9 April 2019 32	Al-Qaisumah	2–1	Hajer	Hafar al-Batin
15:55	Al-Harbi 2' (o.g.); Lakroum 85'	Report	Diego Barboza 61'	Stadium: Al-Batin Club Stadium; Referee: Sami Al-Jires

16 April 2019 33	Al-Khaleej	3–2	Hajer	Saihat
18:45	Al-Nashi 3'; Sharoma 19', 65'	Report	Al-Jamaan 5'; Ndoye 28', (red card) 55'	Stadium: Al-Khaleej Club Stadium; Referee: Khaled Al-Teris

22 April 2019 34	Hajer	1–2	Damac	Al-Hasa
18:40	Al-Harbi 67'	Report	Kouakou 81'; Hassan 86'	Stadium: Prince Abdullah bin Jalawi Stadium; Referee: Sultan Al-Harbi

1 May 2019 35	Hajer	2–2	Al-Ansar	Al-Hasa
18:50	Diego Barboza 44' (pen.), 82'	Report	Hassan 18'; Al-Hussain 74'	Stadium: Prince Abdullah bin Jalawi Stadium; Referee: Khaled Salwi

5 May 2019 36	Al-Kawkab	1–1	Hajer	Al-Kharj
22:00	Fajardo 90+2'	Report	Al-Huraib 12'	Stadium: Al-Shoulla Club Stadium; Referee: Sultan Al-Okairi

10 May 2019 37	Hajer	1–2	Al-Tai	Al-Hasa
22:00	Al-Jamaan 52'	Report	Mendouga 28'; Dudu 85'	Stadium: Prince Abdullah bin Jalawi Stadium; Referee: Majed Al-Shamrani

15 May 2019 38	Al-Ain	1–2	Hajer	Al Bahah
22:00	Diego Assis 53'	Report	Al-Jamaan 15'; Gikiewicz 18'	Stadium: King Saud Sport City Stadium; Referee: Khaled Salwi

=== King Cup ===
All times are local, AST (UTC+3).

2 January 2019 Round of 64	Al-Hait	0–1	Hajer	Ha'il
15:30		Report	Al-Solan 67'	Stadium: Prince Abdul Aziz bin Musa'ed Stadium; Referee: Abdullah Al-Nuhait

16 January 2019 Round of 32	Hajer	0–3	Al-Hilal	Al-Hasa
17:55		Report	Gomis 21' (pen.), 80'; Carlos Eduardo 63'	Stadium: Prince Abdullah bin Jalawi Stadium; Referee: Khaled Al-Teris

== Statistics ==
=== Appearances and goals ===
Last updated on 15 May 2019.

No.	Pos	Nat	Player	Total		MS League		King Cup	
No.	Pos	Nat	Player	Apps	Goals	Apps	Goals	Apps	Goals
Goalkeepers
22	GK	(Saudi Arabia) KSA	Abdulraouf Al-Daqeel	9	0	9	0	0	0
23	GK	(Saudi Arabia) KSA	Nawaf Al-Otaibi	4	0	3	0	1	0
Defenders
3	DF	(Nigeria) NGR	Gege Soriola	25	1	22+2	1	1	0
4	DF	(Saudi Arabia) KSA	Hassan Al-Sandal	22	0	17+3	0	2	0
8	DF	(Saudi Arabia) KSA	Abdullah Al-Yousef	38	5	37	5	1	0
12	DF	(Saudi Arabia) KSA	Ali Al-Maani	1	0	0	0	1	0
13	DF	(Saudi Arabia) KSA	Saud Fallatah	6	0	5	0	1	0
32	DF	(Saudi Arabia) KSA	Hamad Al-Jizani	35	0	34	0	1	0
47	DF	(Saudi Arabia) KSA	Nasser Al-Ojail	8	0	4+3	0	1	0
73	DF	(Saudi Arabia) KSA	Hassan Al-Harbi	38	2	37	2	1	0
Midfielders
5	MF	(Saudi Arabia) KSA	Sami Abdulghani	11	0	7+3	0	1	0
6	MF	(Saudi Arabia) KSA	Abdulaziz Al-Shuhaib	0	0	0	0	0	0
9	MF	(Brazil) BRA	Rayllan	18	1	6+11	1	0+1	0
10	MF	(Saudi Arabia) KSA	Jehad Al-Zowayed	12	0	9+3	0	0	0
11	MF	(Saudi Arabia) KSA	Hassan Al-Solan	13	1	2+9	0	1+1	1
14	MF	(Saudi Arabia) KSA	Abdurahman Al-Huraib	34	1	28+4	1	2	0
16	MF	(Saudi Arabia) KSA	Mahmoud Bu Hassan	2	0	0+1	0	1	0
17	MF	(Saudi Arabia) KSA	Haitham Al-Khulaif	23	0	11+10	0	1+1	0
18	MF	(Nigeria) NGR	Djebril Mohammed	28	0	25+2	0	1	0
20	MF	(Saudi Arabia) KSA	Diego Barboza	16	3	16	3	0	0
27	MF	(Saudi Arabia) KSA	Hassan Al-Mohammed	0	0	0	0	0	0
48	MF	(Saudi Arabia) KSA	Abdullah Othman	35	3	28+5	3	1+1	0
88	MF	(Mauritania) MTN	Alassane Diop	27	1	20+6	1	0+1	0
Forwards
7	FW	(Saudi Arabia) KSA	Rashed Al-Salem	8	0	0+8	0	0	0
19	FW	(Senegal) SEN	Waliou Ndoye	30	3	15+13	3	1+1	0
70	FW	(Saudi Arabia) KSA	Faisel Al-Jamaan	31	12	28+3	12	0	0
77	FW	(Saudi Arabia) KSA	Abdulaziz Al-Mutair	21	2	9+11	2	1	0
99	FW	(Poland) POL	Łukasz Gikiewicz	14	2	5+9	2	0	0
Player who made an appearance this season but have left the club
7	MF	(Tunisia) TUN	Ahmed Hosni	18	2	15+2	2	1	0
25	GK	(Iraq) IRQ	Noor Sabri	27	0	26	0	1	0

=== Goalscorers ===
Last updated on 15 May 2019.

Place	Position	Number	Nation	Name	MS League	King Cup	Total
1	FW	70	(Saudi Arabia)	Faisel Al-Jamaan	12	0	12
2	DF	8	(Saudi Arabia)	Abdullah Al-Yousef	5	0	5
3	FW	19	(Senegal)	Waliou Ndoye	3	0	3
3	MF	20	(Brazil)	Diego Barboza	3	0	3
3	MF	48	(Saudi Arabia)	Abdullah Othman	3	0	3
6	MF	7	(Tunisia)	Ahmed Hosni	2	0	2
6	DF	73	(Saudi Arabia)	Hassan Al-Harbi	2	0	2
6	FW	77	(Saudi Arabia)	Abdulaziz Al-Mutair	2	0	2
6	FW	99	(Poland)	Łukasz Gikiewicz	2	0	2
10	DF	3	(Nigeria)	Gege Soriola	1	0	1
10	MF	9	(Brazil)	Rayllan	1	0	1
10	MF	11	(Saudi Arabia)	Hassan Al-Solan	0	1	1
10	MF	14	(Saudi Arabia)	Abdurahman Al-Huraib	1	0	1
10	MF	88	(Mauritania)	Alassane Diop	1	0	1
Own Goals					1	0	1
Total					39	1	40

=== Clean sheets ===
Last updated on 20 March 2019.

Place	Position	Number	Nation	Name	MS League	King Cup	Total
1	GK	25	(Iraq)	Noor Sabri	11	0	11
2	GK	22	(Saudi Arabia)	Abdulraouf Al-Daqeel	1	0	1
2	GK	23	(Saudi Arabia)	Nawaf Al-Otaibi	0	1	1
Total					12	1	13
