= 2016–17 Saudi Crown Prince Cup =

2016–17 Crown Prince Cup
Tournament details
- Country: Saudi Arabia
- Dates: 15 August 2016 – 10 March 2017
- Teams: 30

Final positions
- Champions: Al-Ittihad (8th title)
- Runners-up: Al-Nassr

Tournament statistics
- Matches played: 29
- Goals scored: 80 (2.76 per match)
- Top goal scorer(s): Omar Al Somah (7 goals)
- All statistics correct as of 10 March 2017.

The 2016–17 Saudi Crown Prince Cup was the 42nd season of the Saudi Crown Prince Cup since its establishment in 1957. This season's competition featured a total of 30 teams, 14 teams from the Pro League, and 16 teams from the First Division. It started with the Preliminary stage on 15 August 2016 and concluded with the final on 10 March 2017.

The holders were Al-Hilal who beat Al-Ahli 2–1 in the previous season's final on 19 February 2016. They were eliminated in the semi-finals by Al-Nassr.

Al-Ittihad won their 8th title following a 1–0 win over Al-Nassr in the final.

== Participating teams ==
Pro League (14 Teams)

- Al-Ahli (round of 16 direct entrants)
- Al-Batin
- Al-Ettifaq
- Al-Faisaly
- Al-Fateh
- Al-Hilal (round of 16 direct entrants)
- Al-Ittihad
- Al-Khaleej
- Al-Nassr
- Al-Qadisiyah
- Al-Raed
- Al-Shabab
- Al-Taawoun
- Al-Wehda

First Division (16 Teams)

- Al-Adalah
- Al-Fayha
- Al-Hazem
- Al-Jeel
- Al-Nahda
- Al-Nojoom
- Al-Orobah
- Al-Qaisumah
- Al-Shoulla
- Al-Tai
- Al-Watani
- Damac
- Hajer
- Najran
- Ohod
- Wej

== First stage ==
=== Preliminary round ===
The Preliminary round fixtures were played on 15, 16, 25, 26, 27 & 28 August 2016. All times are local, AST (UTC+3).

15 August 2016 10	Al-Shabab (1)	2–0	Al-Nahda (2)	Riyadh
19:10	Benyettou 13', 22'			Stadium: King Fahd International Stadium; Attendance: 664; Referee: Hussain Abo Shaheen

15 August 2016 4	Al-Ittihad (1)	3–2	Al-Jeel (2)	Mecca
20:55	Al-Muwallad 14' (pen.); Villanueva 69'; Al-Daheem 89'		Douglas 3' (pen.); Adam 51'	Stadium: King Abdul Aziz Stadium; Referee: Khaled Al-Senani

16 August 2016 11	Al-Nassr (1)	3–0	Al-Nojoom (2)	Riyadh
20:55	Al-Raheb 38', 65'; Akash 41'			Stadium: King Fahd International Stadium; Referee: Abdulrahman Al-Shehri

25 August 2016 2	Hajer (2)	3–3 (a.e.t.) (4–2 p)	Damac (2)	Al-Hasa
18:50	Al-Remthi 66' (o.g.); Al-Arfej 92'; Al-Ibrahim 94'		Suanon 78', 107'Eisa 105'	Stadium: Prince Abdullah bin Jalawi Stadium; Attendance: 80; Referee: Fahad Al-Oraini
	Penalties
	Al-Thodan (penalty scored); Al-Huraib (penalty missed); Al-Traidi (penalty scored); Al-Khalaf (penalty scored); Al-Ibrahim (penalty scored)		(penalty scored) Suanon; (penalty missed) Eisa; (penalty missed) Ilyas; (penalty scored) Al-Ahmed

25 August 2016 6	Al-Shoulla (2)	0–0 (a.e.t.) (4–5 p)	Al-Batin (1)	Al-Kharj
19:00				Stadium: Al-Shoulla Club Stadium; Referee: Mohammed Al-Smail
	Penalties
	Al-Ajmi (penalty scored); Al-Aliweh (penalty missed); Attiyah (penalty scored); Al-Dossari (penalty scored); Diba Ilunga (penalty missed); Al-Sobeai (penalty scored); Al-Rabee (penalty missed)		(penalty scored) Ghunaiman; (penalty missed) Santos; (penalty scored) Jorge; (penalty scored) Nasser; (penalty missed) Ayyadah; (penalty scored) Dakheel; (penalty scored) Mohanna

25 August 2016 13	Al-Wehda (1)	3–1	Al-Qaisumah (2)	Mecca
20:55	Dagoulou 4'; Felipe 75', 84'		Jahfali 63'	Stadium: King Abdul Aziz Stadium; Referee: Abdullah Al-Awedan

26 August 2016 5	Al-Tai (2)	0–1	Al-Qadisiyah (1)	Ha'il
19:20			Al-Amri 40'	Stadium: Prince Abdul Aziz bin Musa'ed Stadium; Referee: Mohammed Al-Nuhait

26 August 2016 8	Al-Fayha (2)	0–2	Al-Raed (1)	Al Majma'ah
20:55			Adriano 57'; Bangoura 66'	Stadium: King Salman Sport City Stadium; Referee: Mohammed Al-Qarni

26 August 2016 9	Najran (2)	3–0	Al-Adalah (2)	Jeddah
20:55	Al Mansor 13', 88'; Salawati 81'			Stadium: King Abdullah Sports City Reserve Stadium; Referee: Abdulrahman Al-Shehri

27 August 2016 12	Al-Watani (2)	1–0	Al-Ettifaq (1)	Tabuk
19:45	Al-Blwi 90+4'			Stadium: King Khalid Sport City Stadium; Referee: Sultan Al-Harbi

27 August 2016 1	Wej (2)	0–2	Al-Faisaly (1)	Ta'if
20:55			Everaldo 20'; Abbas 36'	Stadium: King Fahd Stadium; Referee: Raed Al-Zahrani

28 August 2016 3	Al-Fateh (1)	2–1 (a.e.t.)	Ohod (2)	Al-Hasa
18:50	João Guilherme 12'; Nathan 102'		Al-Hafdhi 49'	Stadium: Prince Abdullah bin Jalawi Stadium; Attendance: 274; Referee: Majed Al-Shamrani

28 August 2016 7	Al-Orobah (2)	2–3 (a.e.t.)	Al-Taawoun (1)	Sakakah
19:25	Cortez 50'; Al-Aboud 90+2'		Al-Zain 43'; Al-Dawsari 45' (o.g.); Al-Shameri 119'	Stadium: Al-Oruba Club Stadium; Attendance: 335; Referee: Faisal Al-Blwi

28 August 2016 14	Al-Khaleej (1)	1–0	Al-Hazem (2)	Khobar
20:55	Al Salem 66'			Stadium: Prince Saud bin Jalawi Stadium; Attendance: 150; Referee: Hussain Abo Shaheen

== Second stage ==
=== Bracket ===
Round of 16
H	Al-Ahli	2
A	Al-Faisaly	1
H	Hajer	1
A	Al-Fateh	0
H	Al-Ittihad (pen.)	1 (8)
A	Al-Qadisiyah	1 (7)
A	Al-Batin	2
H	Al-Taawoun	0
A	Al-Hilal	2
H	Al-Raed	1
A	Najran	0
H	Al-Shabab	6
A	Al-Nassr	3
H	Al-Watani	1
H	Al-Wehda (pen.)	1 (4)
A	Al-Khaleej	1 (1)

Quarter-finals
A	Al-Ahli	6
H	Hajer	1
A	Al-Ittihad	1
H	Al-Batin	0
H	Al-Hilal	2
A	Al-Shabab	0
H	Al-Nassr	1
A	Al-Wehda	0

Semi-finals
A	Al-Ahli	2
H	Al-Ittihad	3
H	Al-Hilal	0
A	Al-Nassr	2

Final
–	Al-Ittihad	1
–	Al-Nassr	0

Note: H: Home team, A: Away team

=== Round of 16 ===
The Round of 16 fixtures were played on 26, 27, 28 & 29 September 2016. All times are local, AST (UTC+3).

26 September 2016 19	Al-Raed (1)	1–2	Al-Hilal (1)	Buraidah
18:35	Gilmar 83'	Report	Al-Abed 36', 41'	Stadium: King Abdullah Sport City Stadium; Referee: Abdulrahman Al-Sultan

27 September 2016 20	Al-Shabab (1)	6–0	Najran (2)	Riyadh
18:25	Heberty 45+2'; Benyettou 53', 60', 63'; Muath 86'; Al-Sulayhem 88'	Report		Stadium: King Fahd International Stadium; Referee: Majed Al-Shamrani

27 September 2016 21	Al-Watani (2)	1–3	Al-Nassr (1)	Tabuk
19:05	Al-Yamani 53'	Report	Sufyani 8'; Uvini 31'; Al-Raheb 90+2'	Stadium: King Khalid Sport City Stadium; Referee: Shukri Al-Hanfoush

27 September 2016 15	Al-Ahli (1)	2–1	Al-Faisaly (1)	Jeddah
20:15	Al Somah 66' (pen.), 82' (pen.)	Report	Alemão 50'	Stadium: King Abdullah Sports City; Referee: Turki Al-Khudhayr

28 September 2016 16	Hajer (2)	1–0	Al-Fateh (1)	Al-Hasa
18:15	Soumah 55'	Report		Stadium: Prince Abdullah bin Jalawi Stadium; Referee: Abdullah Al-Awidan

28 September 2016 17	Al-Ittihad (1)	1–1 (a.e.t.) (8–7 p)	Al-Qadisiyah (1)	Jeddah
20:15	Villanueva 42'	Report	N. Hazazi 12'	Stadium: King Abdullah Sports City; Attendance: 16,063; Referee: Mishari Al-Mishari
	Penalties
	Akaïchi (penalty scored); Al Ansari (penalty missed); Al-Muwallad (penalty scored); Villanueva (penalty scored); Al-Daheem (penalty scored); Al-Nakhli (penalty scored); Al-Muziel (penalty scored); Bajandouh (penalty scored); Al-Qarni (penalty scored)		(penalty scored) Bezerra; (penalty scored) N. Hazazi; (penalty missed) Al-Shoeil; (penalty scored) Fallatah; (penalty scored) Abdul-Amir; (penalty scored) Al-Khabrani; (penalty scored) Abo Shararah; (penalty scored) Al-Najrani; (penalty missed) Masrahi

29 September 2016 18	Al-Taawoun (1)	0–2	Al-Batin (1)	Buraidah
18:35		Report	Jorge 74'; W. Al-Enezi 90+5'	Stadium: King Abdullah Sport City Stadium; Referee: Faisal Al-Blwi

29 September 2016 22	Al-Wehda (1)	1–1 (a.e.t.) (4–1 p)	Al-Khaleej (1)	Mecca
20:15	Al-Musalem 13'	Report	Al-Mohammed 28'	Stadium: King Abdul Aziz Stadium; Referee: Khaled Al-Senani
	Penalties
	Al-Shamekh (penalty scored); Al-Harbi (penalty scored); Lima (penalty scored); Dagoulou (penalty scored)		(penalty missed) López; (penalty scored) Jandson; (penalty missed) Ouro-Akoriko

=== Quarter-finals ===
The quarter-finals fixtures were played on 24 & 25 October 2016. All times are local, AST (UTC+3).

24 October 2016 24	Al-Batin (1)	0–1	Al-Ittihad (1)	Hafar al-Batin
18:00		Report	Al-Muwallad 58'	Stadium: Al-Batin Club Stadium; Attendance: 5,800; Referee: Shukri Al-Hanfoush

24 October 2016 25	Al-Hilal (1)	2–0	Al-Shabab (1)	Riyadh
20:00	Al-Breik 11'; Léo 16'	Report		Stadium: King Fahd International Stadium; Referee: Fahad Al-Mirdasi

25 October 2016 23	Hajer (2)	1–6	Al-Ahli (1)	Al-Hasa
17:45	Soumah 73'	Report	Al-Otaibi 16' (o.g.); Al Somah 22', 36', 39'; Hawsawi 53' (pen.); Assiri 69'	Stadium: Prince Abdullah bin Jalawi Stadium; Attendance: 1,459; Referee: Mohammed Al-Nuhait

25 October 2016 26	Al-Nassr (1)	1–0	Al-Wehda (1)	Riyadh
20:00	Al-Sahlawi 39'	Report		Stadium: King Fahd International Stadium; Referee: Khaled Al Teris

=== Semi-finals ===
The semi-finals fixtures were played on 26 & 27 December 2016. All times are local, AST (UTC+3).

26 December 2016 28	Al-Hilal (1)	0–2	Al-Nassr (1)	Riyadh
19:50		Report	Al-Sahlawi 26' (pen.); Tomasov 40'	Stadium: King Fahd International Stadium; Referee: Turki Al-Khudhayr

27 December 2016 27	Al-Ittihad (1)	3–2	Al-Ahli (1)	Jeddah
19:50	Akaïchi 28'; Kahraba 38'; Al-Muwallad 90'	Report	Al Somah 72', 76' (pen.)	Stadium: King Abdullah Sports City; Attendance: 47,223; Referee: Mohammed Al Hoaish

=== Final ===
The final was held on 10 March 2017 in the King Fahd International Stadium in Riyadh. All times are local, AST (UTC+3).

10 March 2017
20:35 UTC+3

Al-Ittihad	1–0	Al-Nassr
Kahraba 16'	Report

King Fahd International Stadium, Riyadh
Attendance: 57,584
Referee: Mark Clattenburg (England)

== Top goalscorers ==
As of 10 March 2017

Rank	Player	Club	Goals
1	(Syria) Omar Al Somah	Al-Ahli	7
2	(Algeria) Mohamed Benyettou	Al-Shabab	5
3	(Saudi Arabia) Hassan Al-Raheb	Al-Nassr	3
3	(Saudi Arabia) Fahad Al-Muwallad	Al-Ittihad	3
