= Saeed Al-Zahrani =

Saeed Al-Zahrani may refer to:

- Saeed Al-Zahrani (footballer, born 1992), Saudi footballer
- Saeed Al-Zahrani (footballer, born 1995), Saudi footballer
