= Talal Al-Zahrani =

Saudi footballer

Personal information
- Full name: Talal Abdullah Al-Zahrani
- Date of birth: December 8, 1981 (age 44)
- Place of birth: Saudi Arabia
- Position: Defender

Youth career
- Hajer

Senior career*
| Years | Team | Apps | (Gls) |
| 2002–2012 | Hajer | | |
| 2012–2015 | Al-Jeel | | |
| 2015–2018 | Al-Adalah | | |
- * Club domestic league appearances and goals

Talal Al-Zahrani (Arabic: طلال الزهراني; born December 8, 1981) is a Saudi football player who plays a defender .
