= Safwan Hawsawi =

Saudi Arabian footballer

Personal information
- Full name: Safwan Mohammed Hawsawi
- Date of birth: 23 April 1992 (age 34)
- Place of birth: Saudi Arabia
- Height: 1.85 m (6 ft 1 in)
- Position: Defender

Youth career
- Al-Wehda

Senior career*
Years	Team	Apps	(Gls)
2013–2014	Louletano	11	(0)
2015–2017	Al-Taawon	7	(0)
2017–2018	Hajer		
2018–2019	Al-Ain	20	(1)
2020	Al-Nojoom		
2021	Al-Lewaa		
- * Club domestic league appearances and goals

Safwan Hawsawi Arabic: صفوان هوساوي (born 23 April 1992) is a Saudi football player who currently plays as a defender .
