= Jassem Al-Hamdan =

Saudi Arabian footballer

Personal information
- Full name: Jassem Mohammed Al-Hamdan
- Date of birth: October 9, 1986 (age 40)
- Place of birth: Saudi Arabia
- Position: Forward

Team information
- Current team: Al-Hada
- Number: 9

Senior career*
| Years | Team | Apps | (Gls) |
| 2006–2010 | Al-Rawdhah | | |
| 2010–2015 | Al-Nahda | | |
| 2015–2017 | Hajer | 50 | (9) |
| 2017–2019 | Al-Nahda | | |
| 2019–2020 | Al-Jeel | | |
| 2020–2021 | Al-Nahda | 35 | (8) |
| 2021–2022 | Al-Khaleej | 19 | (4) |
| 2022–2024 | Al-Nairyah | | |
| 2024–2025 | Al-Nojoom | | |
| 2025– | Al-Hada | | |
- * Club domestic league appearances and goals

Jassem Al-Hamdan (Arabic: جاسم الحمدان; born October 9, 1986) is a Saudi Arabian footballer who plays as a forward for Al-Hada.

== Honours ==
Al-Nahda

- Second Division: 2010–11
- First Division runner-up: 2012–13

Al-Khaleej

- First Division: 2021–22
