= Hani Al-Dhahi =

Saudi Arabian footballer

Personal information
- Full name: Hani Naji Al-Dhahi
- Date of birth: December 1, 1985 (age 40)
- Place of birth: Dammam, Saudi Arabia
- Height: 1.68 m (5 ft 6 in)
- Position: Attacking midfielder

Team information
- Current team: Al-Thoqbah

Youth career
- Al-Nahda

Senior career*
Years	Team	Apps	(Gls)
2007–2016	Al-Nahda		
2016	Al-Fayha		
2016–2017	Hajer	18	(1)
2017–2019	Abha		
2019–2021	Al-Taraji		
2021–2023	Mudhar		
2023–2024	Al-Hada		
2024–	Al-Thoqbah		
- * Club domestic league appearances and goals

Hani Al-Dhahi (Arabic: هاني الضاحي; born December 1, 1985) is a Saudi football player who plays for Al-Thoqbah as an attacking midfielder .
