= Alassane Diop (footballer) =

Mauritanian footballer, midfield

Personal information
- Full name: Alassane Diop
- Date of birth: 22 September 1997 (age 29)
- Place of birth: Teyarett, Mauritania
- Height: 1.88 m (6 ft 2 in)
- Position: Midfielder

Team information
- Current team: Al-Orouba
- Number: 99

Senior career*
Years	Team	Apps	(Gls)
2015–2017	Nouadhibou		
2017	Liepāja	1	(0)
2017–2018	Nouadhibou		
2018–2019	Hajer	26	(1)
2019	Al-Shamal		
2019	Zakho		
2020–	Al-Orouba		

International career^{‡}
2015–	Mauritania	15	(1)
- * Club domestic league appearances and goals as of 9 January 2019 ‡ National team caps and goals as of 13 August 2025 (UTC)

Alassane Diop (born 22 September 1997) is a Mauritanian footballer who plays as a midfielder for Zakho and the Mauritania national team.

== Club career ==
On 31 December 2019 Diop confirmed on his official Instagram account, that he had joined Omani club Al-Orouba SC.

== International career ==
Diop was included in Mauritania's squad for the 2018 African Nations Championship squads in Morocco. He made his debut for Mauritania on 13 January 2018 against Morocco.

== Career statistics ==
=== International ===
Statistics accurate as of match played 16 October 2018

Mauritania national team
Year	Apps	Goals
2018	6	0
Total	6	0

== Honours ==
- Latvian Football Cup: winner (2017)
