= Rayan Al-Boqami =

Saudi Arabian footballer

Personal information
- Full name: Rayan Khaled Al-Boqami
- Date of birth: August 31, 1992 (age 34)
- Place of birth: Riyadh, Saudi Arabia
- Position: Midfielder

Youth career
- ???–2014: Al-Nassr

Senior career*
Years	Team	Apps	(Gls)
2014–2016	Al-Nassr	0	(0)
2014–2015	→ Najran (loan)	4	(0)
2015–2016	→ Al-Tai (loan)		
2016	→ Al-Wehda (loan)		
2017	Wej		
2017–2018	Al-Nahda		
2018–2019	Al-Najma		
2019–2020	Al-Tadamon		
2020–2021	Al-Zulfi		
2021	Al-Rawdhah		
2021–2022	Al-Nojoom		
2022–2023	Radwa		
2023–2024	Al-Majd		
- * Club domestic league appearances and goals

Rayan Khaled Al-Boqami (Arabic: ريان خالد البقمي; born August 31, 1992) is a Saudi Arabian footballer who plays as a midfielder.
