= Gege Soriola =

Nigerian footballer

Personal information
- Full name: Oluwafemi Gege Soriola
- Date of birth: 21 November 1988 (age 37)
- Place of birth: Nigeria
- Height: 1.87 m (6 ft 1 1/2 in)
- Position: Centre back

Team information
- Current team: Riffa
- Number: 3

Senior career*
Years	Team	Apps	(Gls)
2007–2008	JUTH		
2008–2009	Hakoah Amidar Ramat Gan	0	(0)
2009–2010	Bayelsa United		
2010–2011	Heartland		
2011–2014	Free State Stars	40	(1)
2014	Montreal Impact	0	(0)
2016	Shooting Stars		
2016–2018	Al-Malkiya		
2018–2019	Hajer	4	(0)
2019–	Riffa		

International career
2012	Nigeria	1	(0)
- * Club domestic league appearances and goals as of 15:34, 18 September 2018 (UTC)

Oluwafemi Gege Soriola (born 21 November 1988) is a Nigerian international footballer who plays for Saudi club Riffa SC as a centre back.

== Club career ==
Soriola has played club football for JUTH, Hakoah Amidar Ramat Gan, Bayelsa United, Heartland, Free State Stars, Montreal Impact, Shooting Stars and Malkiya.

On 19 June 2018, he joined Prince Mohammad bin Salman League club Hajer Club. He left the club at the end of the season and signed with Riffa SC from Bahrain in August 2019.

== International career ==
He made his international debut for Nigeria in 2012.
