= Ahmed Al-Khater =

Saudi Arabian footballer

Personal information
- Full name: Ahmed Mansour Al-Khater
- Date of birth: December 16, 1985 (age 40)
- Place of birth: Saudi Arabia
- Height: 1.82 m (5 ft 11 1/2 in)
- Position: Defender

Youth career
- Al-Taraji

Senior career*
Years	Team	Apps	(Gls)
2006–2009	Al-Taraji		
2009–2011	Al-Raed	2	(0)
2011	→ Al-Hazem (loan)	3	(0)
2011–2013	Abha		
2013–2014	Al-Kawkab		
2014–2016	Al-Nahda		
2016–2017	Hajer	7	(1)
2017–2018	Al-Kawkab		
2019–2021	Arar		
2021–2022	Al-Jandal		
2023–2024	Al-Muheet		
- * Club domestic league appearances and goals

Ahmed Al-Khater (Arabic: أحمد الخاطر; born 16 December 1985) is a Saudi Arabian footballer who currently plays as a defender.
