= Khaled Al-Aboud =

Saudi Arabian footballer

Personal information
- Full name: Khaled Al-Aboud
- Date of birth: 1 May 1990 (age 36)
- Place of birth: Saudi Arabia
- Height: 1.73 m (5 ft 8 in)
- Position: Winger

Senior career*
Years	Team	Apps	(Gls)
2011–2017	Al-Ettifaq	27	(5)
2012–2013	→ Al-Khaleej (loan)		
2016–2017	→ Al-Khaleej (loan)	10	(0)
2017	→ Al-Nojoom (loan)		
2017–2018	Hajer	18	(1)
2018	→ Al-Muzahimiyyah (loan)		
2018–2019	Al-Kawkab		
2019–2020	Hajer		
2020–2021	Al-Nojoom		
2021–2022	Al-Safa		
2022–2023	Mudhar		
- * Club domestic league appearances and goals

Khaled Al-Aboud (Arabic: خالد العبود, born 1 May 1990) is a Saudi Arabian footballer who plays as a winger.
