= Jaafer Al-Saeed =

Saudi Arabian footballer

Personal information
- Full name: Jaafer Khalifah Al-Saeed
- Date of birth: February 11, 1991 (age 35)
- Place of birth: Saudi Arabia
- Position: Defender

Team information
- Current team: Al Tuhami
- Number: 44

Youth career
- –2012: Al-Rawdhah

Senior career*
Years	Team	Apps	(Gls)
2012–2013	Al-Ettifaq		
2013–2016	Najran	6	(0)
2015–2016	→ Al-Fayha (loan)		
2016–2017	Al-Kawkab		
2017–2018	Hajer		
2018–2019	Al-Sharq		
2019–2021	Al-Sadd		
2021–2022	Al-Jeel		
2022	Al-Sadd		
2022–2023	Al-Sharq		
2023–2024	Tuwaiq		
2024–2025	Al-Ghottah		
2025–	Al Tuhami		
- * Club domestic league appearances and goals

Jaafer Khalifah Al-Saeed (Arabic: جعفر خليفة السعيد; born February 11, 1991) is a Saudi football player who plays as a defender for Al Tuhami.

== Career ==
On 15 August 2022, Al-Saeed joined Al-Sharq.

On 26 July 2023, Al-Saeed joined Tuwaiq.

On 31 August 2024, Al-Saeed joined Al-Ghottah.
