= Riyadh Al-Ibrahim =

Saudi Arabian footballer (born 1993)

Personal information
- Full name: Riyadh Hassan Al-Ibrahim
- Date of birth: 14 December 1993 (age 32)
- Place of birth: Al-Hasa, Saudi Arabia
- Height: 1.75 m (5 ft 9 in)
- Position: Winger

Team information
- Current team: Al-Adalah
- Number: 7

Youth career
- –2010: Al-Sawab
- 2010–2013: Hajer

Senior career*
Years	Team	Apps	(Gls)
2013–2018	Hajer	54	(14)
2015–2016	→ Al-Ittihad (loan)	11	(0)
2017	→ Al-Batin (loan)	4	(0)
2018	Al-Raed	2	(0)
2018–2019	Al-Ain	12	(0)
2019–2020	Jeddah	4	(0)
2020	Al-Nojoom	13	(3)
2020–2024	Al-Khaleej	66	(5)
2024	Al-Kholood	15	(4)
2024–2025	Al-Najma	24	(1)
2025–	Al-Adalah	0	(0)
- * Club domestic league appearances and goals as of 20 January 2024

Riyadh Hassan Al-Ibrahim (Arabic: رياض حسن البراهيم; born 14 December 1993) is a Saudi Arabian football (soccer) player who plays for Al-Adalah as a winger.

== Career ==
On 20 January 2024, Al-Ibrahim joined Al-Kholood.

On 11 September 2025, Al-Ibrahim joined Al-Najma.

On 11 September 2025, Al-Ibrahim joined Al-Adalah.

== Honours ==
Hajer

- First Division: 2013–14

Al-Khaleej

- First Division: 2021–22

Al-Kholood

- First Division third place: 2023–24 (Promotion to Pro League)

Al-Najma

- First Division second place: 2024–25 (Promotion to Pro League)
