= Yousef Al-Thodan =

Jordanian footballer

Personal information
- Full name: Yousef Ahmed Al-Thodan
- Date of birth: 9 February 1989 (age 37)
- Place of birth: Irbid, Jordan
- Position: Central midfielder

Team information
- Current team: Sama Al-Sarhan

Youth career
- Al-Arabi (Irbid)

Senior career*
Years	Team	Apps	(Gls)
2010–2014	Al-Arabi (Irbid)		
2014–2015	Al-Ettifaq	22	(2)
2015–2016	Al-Orobah		
2016–2017	Hajer	10	(1)
2017	Al-Shoalah		
2017–2018	Al-Ramtha		
2018–2019	Al-Sareeh		
2019	Al-Hejaz		
2021	Al-Sareeh		
2024–	Sama Al-Sarhan		

International career
2010–2012	Jordan U23	3	
2014	Jordan	1	(0)
- * Club domestic league appearances and goals

Yousef Ahmed Al-Thodan (Arabic: يوسف أحمد الذودان; born 9 February 1989) is a Jordanian football player who plays as a central midfielder for Jordanian First Division League club Sama Al-Sarhan, as well as a former Jordan national football team player.

== International career ==
Al-Thodan's first international match with the Jordan national senior team was against Colombia on 7 June 2014 when Colombia won 3–0.
