= Nasser Al-Ojail =

Saudi footballer

Personal information
- Full name: Nasser Adel Al-Ojail
- Date of birth: December 30, 1996 (age 29)
- Place of birth: Saudi Arabia
- Position: Full back

Team information
- Current team: Al-Hedaya
- Number: 47

Senior career*
Years	Team	Apps	(Gls)
2015–2019	Hajer	40	(0)
2020	Al-Nojoom		
2020–2021	Al-Omran		
2021	Al-Rawdhah		
2022	Al-Nojoom		
2022–2023	Radwa		
2024–	Al-Hedaya		
- * Club domestic league appearances and goals

Nasser Adel Al-Ojail (Arabic: ناصر عادل العجيل; born December 30, 1996) is a Saudi footballer who plays for Al-Hedaya as a full back.
