= Mohammed Al-Safri =

Saudi Arabian footballer

Personal information
- Full name: Mohammed Salem Al-Safri
- Date of birth: June 25, 1990 (age 36)
- Place of birth: Saudi Arabia
- Height: 1.88 m (6 ft 2 in)
- Position: Midfielder

Team information
- Current team: Wej

Youth career
- Al-Ahli

Senior career*
Years	Team	Apps	(Gls)
2008–2013	Al-Ahli	31	(2)
2011–2012	→ Al-Ettifaq (loan)	2	(1)
2014	Al-Hazem	10	(1)
2014–2015	Al-Shoulla	16	(0)
2015–2016	Al-Faisaly	13	(0)
2017	Hajer	1	(0)
2019–2020	Jeddah	34	(2)
2020–2021	Al-Jabalain	30	(2)
2021–2022	Al-Qadsiah	21	(0)
2022–2024	Jeddah	39	(4)
2024	Neom	11	(1)
2024–2025	Jeddah	22	(0)
2026–	Wej	0	(0)
- * Club domestic league appearances and goals as of 31 May 2022

Mohammed Al-Safri is a Saudi football player who currently plays for Wej as a midfielder.

On 30 January 2024, Al-Safri joined Saudi Second Division side Neom.

== Honours ==
Al-Ahli

- King Cup: 2011

Neom

- Saudi Second Division League: 2023–24
