= Hassan Al-Harbi =

Saudi Arabian footballer

Personal information
- Full name: Hassan Ali Al-Harbi
- Date of birth: 13 December 1994 (age 31)
- Place of birth: Al-Kharj, Saudi Arabia
- Position: Centre back

Team information
- Current team: Al-Faisaly
- Number: 73

Youth career
- Al-Shoulla

Senior career*
Years	Team	Apps	(Gls)
2015–2016	Al-Shoulla	0	(0)
2016–2019	Hajer	87	(4)
2019–2022	Al-Ain	95	(4)
2022–2023	Al-Qadsiah	27	(0)
2023–	Al-Faisaly	0	(0)
- * Club domestic league appearances and goals as of 30 May 2023

Hassan Al-Harbi (Arabic: حسن الحربي; born 13 December 1994) is a Saudi Arabian professional footballer who plays as a centre back for Al-Faisaly.

== Club career ==
Al-Harbi started his career in the youth team of Al-Shoulla in his hometown Al-Kharj. He was promoted to the first team in 2015 but made no senior appearances for the club. On 22 December 2015, Al-Harbi joined Hajer. He made his first-team debut on 17 November 2016 in the league match against Al-Jeel. He scored his first goal for the club on 18 March 2017 in the 2–2 draw against Al-Shoulla. On 20 June 2019, Al-Harbi Al-Ain on a free transfer. Al-Harbi helped Al-Ain get promoted to the Pro League for the first time in the club's history in his first season at the club. On 18 July 2022, Al-Harbi joined Al-Qadsiah on a free transfer. On 15 July 2023, Al-Harbi joined Al-Faisaly.
