= Saeed Al-Zahrani (footballer, born 1992) =

Saudi Arabian footballer

Personal information
- Full name: Saeed Abdullah Khodar Al-Zahrani
- Date of birth: July 23, 1992 (age 34)
- Place of birth: Saudi Arabia
- Height: 1.75 m (5 ft 9 in)
- Position: Winger

Senior career*
Years	Team	Apps	(Gls)
2012–2015	Al-Wahda		
2015–2016	Al-Fayha		
2016–2021	Al-Kawkab		
2021–2022	Al-Riyadh		
2022–2023	Al-Safa		
2023–2024	Al-Sharq		
- * Club domestic league appearances and goals

Saeed Al-Zahrani (born July 23, 1992) is a Saudi football player. He currently plays as a winger.

== Club career ==
On 4 November 2012, Al-Zahrani made his debut for Al-Wahda in a 1-0 home defeat to Al-Raed played at the King Abdul Aziz Stadium. Al-Zahrani's first goal for Al-Wahda came in a 2-1 defeat to Hajer on the 29 December 2012. Al-Zahrani's 71st-minute strike turned out to be a consolation because of Abdoh Hakami and Abdallatif Albahdari goals for Hajer which were both converted from the penalty spot. Al-Zahrani also featured in games against the likes of current Saudi Professional League champions Al-Fateh and Al-Hilal, Saudi Arabia's most successful football club.
