= Abdulaziz Al-Mutair =

Saudi Arabian footballer

Personal information
- Full name: Abdulaziz Saleh Al-Mutair
- Date of birth: November 18, 1992 (age 33)
- Place of birth: Saudi Arabia
- Height: 1.80 m (5 ft 11 in)
- Position: Winger

Team information
- Current team: Al-Lewaa
- Number: 77

Senior career*
Years	Team	Apps	(Gls)
2013–2014	Louletano	1	(0)
2014–2016	Al-Qadsiah	16	(4)
2016–2017	Al-Hazem		
2017–2019	Hajer	35	(2)
2019–2020	Al-Jabalain	21	(2)
2020–2021	Al-Thoqbah	30	(5)
2021–2022	Al-Nahda	31	(3)
2022–2023	Al-Arabi	1	(0)
2023–2024	Al-Ula		
2024–2025	Al-Nahda		
2025–	Al-Lewaa		
- * Club domestic league appearances and goals as of 18 April 2018

Abdulaziz Al-Mutair (Arabic: عبد العزيز المطير, born 18 November 1992), is a Saudi Arabian football player who currently plays as a forward for Al-Lewaa.
