= Naby Soumah =

Guinean footballer

Personal information
- Full name: Naby Capi Soumah
- Date of birth: 25 January 1985 (age 41)
- Place of birth: Conakry, Guinea
- Height: 1.85 m (6 ft 1 in)
- Position: Forward

Team information
- Current team: Al Fahaheel

Youth career
- 2001–2005: Fello Star

Senior career*
Years	Team	Apps	(Gls)
2006–2007	STIR S Zarzouna	22	(10)
2007–2012	Sfaxien	40	(9)
2009	→ Horoya (loan)		
2009–2010	→ Liberty Professionals (loan)		
2012–2013	Al-Faisaly	23	(6)
2013–2014	Difaâ El Jadida		
2014–2015	Hajer	7	(4)
2016–2017	Hajer	11	(4)
2017	Al-Nahda		
2017–2018	Burgan SC		
2018–2019	Al-Shabab		
2019–2020	Al-Nasr		
2020–2021	Al Fahaheel		

International career
2007–2012	Guinea	10	(1)
- * Club domestic league appearances and goals

Naby Capi Soumah (born January 25, 1985) is a Guinean football midfielder who currently plays for Al Fahaheel.

== Club career ==
Soumah played for the Tunisian club Sfaxien, having joined the team in 2007 from STIR S Zarzouna. He played the first half year of the year 2009 for Horoya in the Guinée Championnat National and joined in summer 2009 to Liberty Professionals F.C. in Ghana.

== International career ==
He was a part of the Guinean squad at the 2008 African Cup of Nations. He scored a 6th goal in a 6–1 victory against Botswana in the 2012 Africa Cup of Nations.
