= Ibrahim Al-Subaie =

Saudi Arabian footballer

Personal information
- Full name: Ibrahim Al-Subaie
- Date of birth: October 6, 1986 (age 40)
- Place of birth: Saudi Arabia
- Height: 1.70 m (5 ft 7 in)
- Position: Defender

Youth career
- Al-Ansar

Senior career*
Years	Team	Apps	(Gls)
2007–2014	Al-Ansar		
2014–2017	Ohod		
- * Club domestic league appearances and goals

Ibrahim Al-Subaie (Arabic: إبراهيم السبيع; born October 6, 1986) is a Saudi football player who plays a defender. He played in the Pro League for Al-Ansar.
