= Haitham Al-Khulaif =

Saudi Arabian footballer

Haitham Al-Khulaif هيثم الخليف
Personal information
- Full name: Haitham Ramadan Al-Khulaif
- Date of birth: 24 January 1997 (age 29)
- Place of birth: Al-Hasa, Saudi Arabia
- Position: Midfielder

Team information
- Current team: Al-Nairyah
- Number: 8

Youth career
- 2012–2017: Hajer

Senior career*
| Years | Team | Apps | (Gls) |
| 2017–2023 | Hajer | 150 | (3) |
| 2023–2024 | Al-Taraji | 17 | (0) |
| 2024–2025 | Hajer | 21 | (0) |
| 2025– | Al-Nairyah | | |

International career
| 2018–2020 | Saudi Arabia U23 | | |
- * Club domestic league appearances and goals as of 31 May 2021

Haitham Al-Khulaif (Arabic: هيثم الخليف; born 24 January 1997) is a Saudi Arabian professional footballer who plays as a midfielder for Al-Nairyah.

== Career ==
Al-Khulaif is an academy graduate of Hajer. He made his debut during the 2016–17 season and has been a starter ever since. On 3 August 2018, Al-Khulaif signed a 3-year contract with Hajer keeping him at the club until 2021. He was first called to the U23 national team in December 2018, during the Taif training camp.

On 28 June 2023, Al-Khulaif joined Al-Taraji. On 7 September 2025, Al-Khulaif joined Al-Nairyah.

== Honours ==
Hajer

- Saudi Second Division: 2019–20
