= Hassan Al-Traidi =

Saudi Arabian footballer

Personal information
- Full name: Hassan Saleh Al-Traidi
- Date of birth: September 8, 1989 (age 37)
- Place of birth: Saudi Arabia
- Position: Defender

Youth career
- 2007–2010: Al-Khaleej

Senior career*
Years	Team	Apps	(Gls)
2010–2016	Al-Khaleej		
2016	Al-Nahda		
2016–2017	Hajer	5	(0)
2018–2024	Al Safa		
- * Club domestic league appearances and goals

Hassan Al-Traidi (Arabic: حسن الطريدي; born 8 September 1989) is a football (soccer) player who plays as a defender.

He played in the Saudi Professional League for Al-Khaleej.
