= Ahmed Meshqi =

Saudi Arabian footballer

Personal information
- Full name: Ahmed Hussain Meshqi
- Date of birth: March 20, 1993 (age 33)
- Place of birth: Al Jawf, Saudi Arabia
- Position: Left back

Youth career
- Al-Orobah

Senior career*
| Years | Team | Apps | (Gls) |
| 2014–2015 | Al-Orobah | 18 | (0) |
| 2015–2019 | Al-Khaleej | 24 | (0) |
| 2015–2017 | → Al-Shoulla (loan) | 39 | (0) |
| 2019–2020 | Al-Jabalain | 28 | (0) |
| 2020–2021 | Al-Nahda | 24 | (0) |
| 2021–2022 | Al-Kholood | 12 | (0) |
| 2022–2024 | Al-Diriyah | | |
| 2024–2025 | Al-Shaeib | | |
- * Club domestic league appearances and goals

Ahmed Hussain Meshqi (Arabic:أحمد حسين مشقي) is a footballer who plays as a left back.
