= Mousa Al-Tarjami =

Saudi Arabian footballer

Personal information
- Full name: Mousa Saeed Al-Oufi Al-Tarjami
- Date of birth: February 8, 1991 (age 35)
- Place of birth: Saudi Arabia
- Height: 1.72 m (5 ft 7 1/2 in)
- Position: Midfielder

Team information
- Current team: Khaybar

Youth career
- Al-Raed

Senior career*
Years	Team	Apps	(Gls)
2013–2015	Al-Raed	10	(0)
2015–2017	Ohod		
2017	Hajer	12	(1)
2017–2020	Al-Ansar		
2020–2021	Al-Arabi		
2021	Al-Ansar		
2021–2022	Al-Washm		
2022–2023	Al-Dahab		
2023–	Khaybar		
- * Club domestic league appearances and goals

Mousa Al-Tarjami (Arabic: موسى الترجمي; born February 8, 1991) is a Saudi football player who plays a midfielder for Khaybar.
