= Salman Al-Hariri =

Saudi Arabian footballer

Personal information
- Full name: Salman Saeed Al-Hariri
- Date of birth: July 12, 1988 (age 38)
- Place of birth: Saudi Arabia
- Height: 1.73 m (5 ft 8 in)
- Position: Winger

Youth career
- ???–2007: Al-Noor
- 2007–2008: Ettifaq FC

Senior career*
Years	Team	Apps	(Gls)
2008–2012	Al-Ettifaq	18	(0)
2009	→ Al-Khaleej (loan)		
2010	→ Al-Faisaly (loan)		
2012–2014	Al-Ittihad	4	(0)
2013–2014	Najran	9	(0)
2014–2017	Hajer	35	(3)
2018–2020	Al Safa		
2020–	Al-Taraji		
2021–2024	Al-Noor		
- * Club domestic league appearances and goals

Salman Saeed Al-Hariri (Arabic: سلمان سعيد الحريري; born July 12, 1988) is a Saudi footballer who plays as a winger.
