= Aiedh Al-Joni =

Saudi Arabian footballer

Personal information
- Full name: Aiedh Ali Al-Joni
- Date of birth: February 15, 1988 (age 38)
- Place of birth: Saudi Arabia
- Height: 1.67 m (5 ft 5 1/2 in)
- Position: Midfielder

Team information
- Current team: Al-Qurayat

Youth career
- Al-Suqoor

Senior career*
Years	Team	Apps	(Gls)
2009–2012	Al-Suqoor		
2012–2014	Al-Orobah		
2014–2015	Hajer		
2015–2017	Al-Orobah		
2017–2018	Najran		
2018–2019	Al-Jandal		
2019	Al-Hejaz		
2019–2021	Al-Washm		
2021–2022	Tuwaiq		
2022–2023	Qilwah		
2023–2024	Al-Suqoor		
2025–	Al-Qurayat		
- * Club domestic league appearances and goals

Aiedh Al-Joni (Arabic: عايض الجوني; born February 15, 1988) is a Saudi football player who plays for Al-Qurayat as a midfielder.
