= Ibrahim Al-Ibrahim =

Saudi Arabian footballer

Personal information
- Full name: Ibrahim Taher Al-Ibrahim
- Date of birth: June 3, 1992 (age 34)
- Place of birth: Saudi Arabia
- Height: 1.79 m (5 ft 10 1/2 in)
- Position: Midfielder

Team information
- Current team: Al-Omran
- Number: 78

Senior career*
Years	Team	Apps	(Gls)
2011–2016	Al-Ettifaq	26	(0)
2016–2017	Al-Khaleej	12	(0)
2017–2018	Hajer	10	(0)
2019	Al-Hejaz		
2019–2020	Al-Riyadh		
2020–2021	Al-Arabi		
2021–2022	Al-Jeel		
2024	Wej		
2024–2025	Al-Thoqbah		
2025–	Al-Omran		

International career^{‡}
2010–2011	Saudi Arabia U20		
2012	Saudi Arabia	3	(0)
- * Club domestic league appearances and goals as of 25 August 2017 ‡ National team caps and goals as of 22 January 2017 (UTC)

Ibrahim Al-Ibrahim (Arabic: إبراهيم البراهيم, born 3 June 1992) is a Saudi football player who plays for Al-Omran as a midfielder.
