= Radhi Al-Radhi =

Saudi Arabian footballer

Personal information
- Full name: Radhi Hassan Al-Radhi
- Date of birth: December 13, 1991 (age 34)
- Place of birth: Saudi Arabia
- Height: 1.80 m (5 ft 11 in)
- Position: Defender

Team information
- Current team: Al-Lewaa
- Number: 6

Senior career*
Years	Team	Apps	(Gls)
2012–2018	Hajer	43	(0)
2018–2021	Al-Adalah	63	(5)
2021–2022	Al-Qadsiah	19	(0)
2022–2023	Al-Sahel	25	(2)
2023–2025	Al-Jabalain	21	(0)
2025–	Al-Lewaa		
- * Club domestic league appearances and goals as of 31 May 2022

Radhi Hassan Al-Radhi (Arabic: راضي حسن الراضي; born December 13, 1991) is a Saudi football player who plays a defender for Al-Lewaa.

== Career ==
Al-Radhi began his career at Hajer where he spent six years at the club before joining Al-Adalah in 2018. With Al-Adalah, Al-Radhi earned promotion to the Pro League for the first time in the club's history.

On 27 July 2021, Al-Radhi joined Al-Qadsiah. On 8 July 2022, Al-Radhi joined Al-Sahel.

On 3 July 2023, Al-Radhi joined Al-Jabalain. On 24 September 2025, Al-Radhi joined Al-Lewaa.
