= Abdullah Othman (Saudi footballer) =

Saudi Arabian footballer

Personal information
- Full name: Abdullah Othman Hashem Ali
- Date of birth: December 10, 1990 (age 35)
- Place of birth: Saudi Arabia
- Position: Winger

Team information
- Current team: Al-Safa
- Number: 48

Senior career*
Years	Team	Apps	(Gls)
2010–2011	Al-Hazem	12	(1)
2011–2014	Al-Qadsiah		
2014–2016	Al-Hazem		
2016–2019	Hajer	51	(14)
2019	Ohod	3	(0)
2019–2021	Al-Kholood		
2021–2022	Bisha	30	(0)
2022–	Al-Safa		
- * Club domestic league appearances and goals as of 18 April 2018

Abdullah Othman (Arabic: عبد الله عثمان; born December 10, 1990) is a Saudi football player who plays a winger for Al-Safa.
