= Sami Abdulghani =

Saudi professional footballer

Personal information
- Full name: Sami Abdulghani
- Date of birth: 1 June 1989 (age 37)
- Place of birth: Saudi Arabia
- Height: 1.73 m (5 ft 8 in)
- Positions: Midfielder; left back

Youth career
- Al-Riyadh

Senior career*
Years	Team	Apps	(Gls)
2010–2012	Al-Riyadh		
2012–2014	Al-Wehda		
2014	Al-Ittihad	0	(0)
2014–2015	Al-Fayha		
2015–2016	Al-Orobah		
2016–2019	Hajer		
2019–2020	Al Jeel		
- * Club domestic league appearances and goals as of 18 September 2018

Sami Abdulghani (Arabic: سامي عبد الغني; born 1 June 1989) is a Saudi professional footballer who plays as a midfielder and left back.
