= Hassan Al-Sandal =

Saudi Arabian footballer

Personal information
- Full name: Hassan Taher Al-Sandal
- Date of birth: September 5, 1987 (age 39)
- Place of birth: Al-Hasa, Saudi Arabia
- Position: Defender

Youth career
- Al-Adalah

Senior career*
Years	Team	Apps	(Gls)
2007–2012	Al-Adalah		
2012–2014	Hajer		
2014–2015	Al-Faisaly	0	(0)
2015	Al-Ettifaq	0	(0)
2015–2016	Al-Orobah	24	(1)
2016–2022	Hajer	85	(4)
2017–2018	→ Al-Orobah (loan)	27	(2)
- * Club domestic league appearances and goals as of 31 May 2022

Hassan Al-Sandal (Arabic: حسن الصندل; born September 5, 1987) is a Saudi professional footballer who plays a defender.

== Honours ==
Hajer

- Saudi First Division: 2013–14
- Saudi Second Division: 2019–20
