= Abdullah Al-Yousef (footballer, born 1989) =

Saudi Arabian footballer

Personal information
- Full name: Abdullah Abdulwahab Al-Yousef
- Date of birth: September 16, 1989 (age 37)
- Place of birth: Saudi Arabia
- Position: Left back

Team information
- Current team: Hajer
- Number: 8

Youth career
- Hajer

Senior career*
Years	Team	Apps	(Gls)
2011–2012	Hajer		
2012–2017	Al Jeel		
2017–2019	Hajer	56	(7)
2019–2025	Al-Adalah	130	(4)
2025–	Hajer		
- * Club domestic league appearances and goals as of 31 May 2021

Abdullah Al-Yousef (Arabic: عبد الله اليوسف; born 16 September 1989) is a Saudi professional footballer who currently plays as a left back for Hajer.

On 4 September 2025, Al-Yousef returned to Hajer after six years at Al-Adalah.
