= Khalid Radhy =

Saudi Arabian footballer

Personal information
- Full name: Khalid Radhy Al-Dossari
- Date of birth: 5 December 1981 (age 44)
- Place of birth: Riyadh, Saudi Arabia
- Height: 1.80 m (5 ft 11 in)
- Position: Goalkeeper

Team information
- Current team: Al-Hareq
- Number: 1

Senior career*
Years	Team	Apps	(Gls)
2001–2006	Al-Riyadh		
2006–2013	Al-Nassr	45	(0)
2013–2014	Al-Faisaly	1	(0)
2014–2015	Al-Hazem		
2015–2018	Hajer	48	(0)
2018–2022	Al-Sadd		
2022–2023	Al-Sharq		
2023–2024	Al-Mehmal		
2024–2025	Al-Waseel		
2025–	Al-Hareq		
- * Club domestic league appearances and goals as of 12 April 2018

Khalid Radhy (Arabic: خالد راضي; born 5 December 1981) is a Saudi Arabian professional footballer who plays as a goalkeeper for Saudi Arabian club Al-Hareq.

He started his career at Al-Riyadh, before joining Al-Nassr in 2006 where he spent 7 years mainly as the backup goalkeeper. In 2013, he transferred to Al-Faisaly and spent one year before joining Al-Hazm, where he again spent one year. In the summer of 2015, he joined Hajer and spent two years, before signing an extension keeping him at the club for a further year.
