= Ahmed Al-Nufaili =

Saudi Arabian footballer

Personal information
- Full name: Ahmed Taher Al-Nufaili
- Date of birth: January 11, 1994 (age 32)
- Place of birth: Saudi Arabia
- Height: 1.71 m (5 ft 7 in)
- Position: Left back

Senior career*
Years	Team	Apps	(Gls)
2014–2019	Hajer	62	(0)
2019–2020	Al-Ain	22	(0)
2020–2021	Hajer		
2021–2022	Al-Omran		
- * Club domestic league appearances and goals

Ahmed Taher Al-Nufaili (Arabic: أحمد طاهر النفيلي; born January 11, 1994) was a Saudi football player who played as a left back.
