= Nawaf Al-Otaibi =

Saudi Arabian footballer

Nawaf Al-Otaibi نواف العتيبي
Personal information
- Full name: Nawaf Dagheem Al-Otaibi
- Date of birth: 22 September 1993 (age 33)
- Place of birth: Saudi Arabia
- Height: 1.79 m (5 ft 10 in)
- Position: Goalkeeper

Youth career
- –2013: Al-Shoulla
- 2013–2015: Al-Nassr

Senior career*
Years	Team	Apps	(Gls)
2015–2016	Al-Mujazzal		
2016–2019	Hajer	18	(0)
2019–2022	Al-Nahda		
2022–2023	Al-Sahel	1	(0)
2023–2026	Al-Diriyah		
- * Club domestic league appearances and goals as of 15 May 2019

Nawaf Al-Otaibi (Arabic: نواف العتيبي; born 22 September 1993) is a Saudi Arabian professional footballer who plays as a goalkeeper.

== Career ==
Al-Otaibi started his career in the youth team of Al-Shoulla. On 26 June 2013, Al-Otaibi joined the U23 team of Al-Nassr. He spent two years at Al-Nassr, before joining Al-Mujazzal. Following Al-Mujazzal's relegation to the Second Division, Al-Otaibi joined Hajer on a two-year contract. On 11 June 2018, Al-Otaibi renewed his contract with Hajer keeping him at the club until the end of the 2018–19 season. Following Hajer's relegation to the Second Division, Al-Otaibi joined Al-Nahda. On 29 June 2022, Al-Otaibi joined Al-Sahel. On 11 July 2023, Al-Otaibi joined Al-Diriyah.
