= Abdulrahman Al-Hurib =

Saudi Arabian footballer

Personal information
- Full name: Abdulrahman Abdullah Al-Hurib
- Date of birth: February 5, 1992 (age 34)
- Place of birth: Saudi Arabia
- Height: 1.74 m (5 ft 9 in)
- Position: Midfielder

Team information
- Current team: Hajer
- Number: 14

Senior career*
Years	Team	Apps	(Gls)
2013–2019	Hajer	124	(5)
2020	Al-Rawdhah		
2020–2021	Al-Jeel	29	(0)
2021–2024	Al-Adalah	72	(2)
2024–	Hajer		
- * Club domestic league appearances and goals as of 17 May 2019

Abdulrahman Al-Hurib (Arabic: عبد الرحمن الحريب; born February 5, 1992) is a Saudi professional footballer who plays as a midfielder for Hajer.
