= Prince Abdullah bin Jalawi Stadium =

Football stadium in Saudi Arabia

Prince Abdullah bin Jalawi Sport City Stadium
- Al-Hofuf Stadium
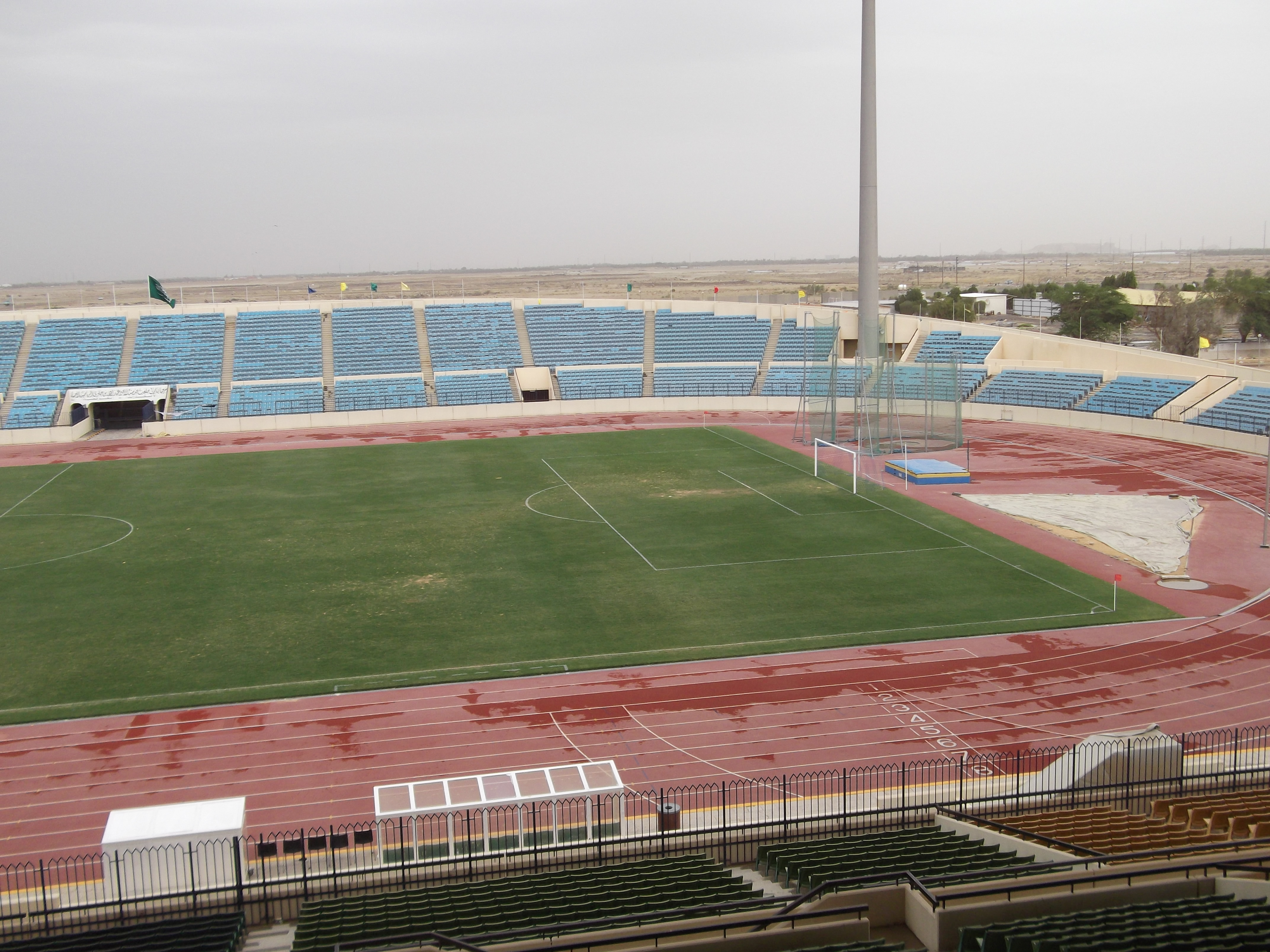
- Interactive map of Prince Abdullah bin Jalawi Sport City Stadium
- Full name: Prince Abdullah bin Jalawi Sport City
- Location: Hofuf, Saudi Arabia
- Coordinates: 25°18′21″N 49°36′46″E
- Owner: Ministry of Sport
- Capacity: 19,099
- Surface: Grass

Construction
- Opened: 1983

Tenants
- Al-Fateh (1983–2023); Hajer (1983–present); Al-Jeel (1983–present); Al-Adalah (1984–present)

Prince Abdullah bin Jalawi Sport City is a football stadium in Hofuf, Saudi Arabia. Also called Hofuf Stadium, it was opened in 1983 and mainly serves as the home ground for local football clubs like Al Fateh and Hajer Club of the Saudi Professional League. The stadium has a seating capacity of 19,099 spectators.

== International matches hosted ==
Date	Competition	Team #1	Res.	Team #2	Attendance
25 March 2025	2027 AFC Asian Cup qualification	Syria	2–0	Pakistan	1,217
10 June	2027 AFC Asian Cup qualification	Afghanistan	0–1	Syria	532

== See also ==
- List of football stadiums in Saudi Arabia
