= Al-Nojoom FC =

Association football club in Saudi Arabia

- Full name: Al-Nojoom FC
- Founded: 1976
- Ground: Prince Abdullah bin Jalawi Stadium; Al-Hasa, Saudi Arabia
- Capacity: 20,000
- Chairman: Abdurahman Al-Kulaib
- Manager: Abdullah Al-Janoubi
- League: Second Division
- 2024-25: Saudi Second Division, 12th (Group A)

Al-Nojoom FC (Arabic: النجوم) is a Saudi Arabian professional sports club based in Al-Hasa, they play their home games in Prince Abdullah bin Jalawi Stadium.

== Honours ==
- Saudi Second Division
  - Runners-up (1): 2014–15
- Saudi Third Division
  - Winners (1): 2012–13

== Current squad ==
As of Saudi Second Division:

Note: Flags indicate national team as defined under FIFA eligibility rules; some limited exceptions apply. Players may hold more than one non-FIFA nationality.

| No. | Pos. | Nation | Player |
|---|---|---|---|
| 7 | MF | KSA | Hussain Al-Momatin |
| 8 | MF | NGR | Ukeme Williams |
| 10 | MF | BRA | Coutinho |
| 11 | FW | KSA | Nasser Al-Nasser |
| 12 | MF | KSA | Abdullah Al-Jwisem |
| 13 | DF | KSA | Mohammed Al-Bladi |
| 14 | MF | KSA | Jaber Al-Hadrami |
| 15 | MF | KSA | Mohammed Attiyah |
| 17 | DF | KSA | Ibrahim Boussaid |
| 18 | DF | KSA | Eissa Al-Saeed |
| 19 | FW | KSA | Saad Al-Saad |
| 20 | MF | KSA | Mazen Al-Johani |

| No. | Pos. | Nation | Player |
|---|---|---|---|
| 21 | GK | KSA | Mohammed Assiri |
| 23 | DF | KSA | Ammar Bo Eissa |
| 27 | GK | KSA | Mohammed Al-Jomaish |
| 32 | MF | KSA | Mohammed Al-Awwad |
| 34 | DF | TUN | Montasser Toumi |
| 43 | MF | KSA | Hamad Al-Ghamdi |
| 55 | DF | KSA | Amjad Takrouni |
| 66 | GK | KSA | Mohammed Al-Abdulateef |
| 70 | FW | KSA | Safi Al-Zaqrati |
| 75 | MF | KSA | Fouad Al-Shaqaq |
| 77 | FW | KSA | Khaled Al-Bakhit |
| 81 | DF | KSA | Maitham Al-Eissa |
| 99 | FW | CGO | Prince Ibara |

== See also ==
- List of football clubs in Saudi Arabia
