= Hajer FC =

Association football club in Al-Hasa, Saudi Arabia

- Full name: Hajer Football Club Al-Hasa
- Nicknames: Sheikh Andiyat Al-Ahsa; Al Sheikh Al Hajrawi
- Founded: 1950; 76 years ago
- Ground: Prince Abdullah bin Jalawi Sport City; Al-Ahsa, Saudi Arabia
- Capacity: 19,550
- Chairman: Hamad Al-Arifi
- Manager: Afouène Gharbi
- League: Second Division
- 2024–25: SDL, 4th of 16, Group A
- Website: hajerclub.com
Home colours	Away colours

Hajer Football Club (Arabic: نادي هجر) is a professional association football club based in Al-Hasa, Saudi Arabia. The team play in the Saudi First Division League, the 2nd tier of Saudi Football.

Established in 1950, the club is the oldest team in the Al-Hasa region. The club have been promoted to the top tier of Saudi Football on 4 different occasions. Hajer have a record equal 4 First Division titles and have won the Prince Faisal bin Fahd cup once.

== History ==
Hajer Club were founded in the city of Hofuf, part of the Al-Ahsa province, in 1948 and they are the oldest professional football club in the Al-Ahsa region. The club was officially recognized as a professional football club in the year of 1950. The club was formerly called "Al-Badr" before changing their name to "Hajer".

In the 2010–11 season Hajer finished first in the Saudi First Division and were promoted to the Saudi Professional League for the first time since 1998.

== Honours ==
Note:

- Prince Faisal bin Fahd Cup for Division 1 and 2 Teams
  - Winners (1): 2004–05
  - Runners-up (2): 1995–96, 2000–01
- Saudi First Division League (tier 2)
  - Winners (4): 1987–88, 1997–98, 2010–11, 2013–14
- Saudi Second Division League (tier 3)
  - Winners (1): 2001–02

== Administration ==
The current administration that runs the club is the club-president Hamad Al-Arifi and vice-president Osama Al-Naeem.

== Personnel ==
- Chairman: (Saudi Arabia) Sami Al-Melhem
- Director of football: (Serbia) Slobodan Ogsananovic
- Media Officer: (Saudi Arabia) Ali Al Saeed
- Head Coach: (Saudi Arabia) Abdullah Al-Janoubi

== Current squad ==
As of 7 September 2024:

Note: Flags indicate national team as defined under FIFA eligibility rules; some limited exceptions apply. Players may hold more than one non-FIFA nationality.

No.	Pos.	Nation	Player
1	GK	KSA	Basil Al-Bahrani
4	DF	ALG	Ayoub Derbal
5	DF	KSA	Murtadha Al-Burayh
6	MF	KSA	Hamad Al-Harbi
7	DF	KSA	Nasser Al-Khalifa
8	DF	KSA	Abdullah Al-Yousef
9	FW	KSA	Waleed Ghazwani
10	MF	TUN	Wadhah Zaidi
11	FW	KSA	Khalid Kamal
12	DF	KSA	Ahmed Al-Dagher
13	DF	KSA	Abdulelah Al-Hazeem
14	MF	KSA	Abdulrahman Al-Hurib
15	MF	KSA	Sultan Al-Shammeri
17	DF	SEN	Bakary Coulibaly
18	MF	KSA	Hassan Jaafari
21	GK	KSA	Abdullah Al-Bahri

No.	Pos.	Nation	Player
24	MF	KSA	Osama Al-Mobairik
29	MF	KSA	Hussein Al-Ghasham
30	FW	KSA	Ammar Al-Anbar
40	GK	KSA	Basil Al-Numair
47	FW	KSA	Rayan Al-Bloushi
70	MF	KSA	Omar Al-Sohaymi
77	FW	KSA	Karrar Al-Qanbar
80	MF	KSA	Abdullah Al-Mubarak
81	MF	KSA	Abdullah Al-Makki
86	FW	KSA	Ziyad Al-Rasheed
87	DF	KSA	Ali Al-Eissa
88	MF	KSA	Hassan Al-Mohammed
91	FW	KSA	Ali Al-Mayyad
97	MF	JOR	Khader Al-Haj
99	FW	GHA	Albert Amoah

== Managerial history ==
- (England) Peter Morris (1986)
- (Saudi Arabia) Hamad Al-Khatim (1986–87)
- (Brazil) Gaúcho (2000–01)
- (Brazil) Luís Freire (1 August 2005 – 24 October 2005)
- (Tunisia) Samir Sellimi (25 October 2005 – 14 March 2007)
- (Tunisia) Fathi Al-Jabal (14 March 2007 – 30 May 2007)
- (Brazil) Moisés (24 September 2007 – 28 October 2007)
- (Brazil) Maurílio (28 October 2007 – 30 May 2008)
- (Egypt) Emad Soliman (11 June 2008 – 11 April 2009)
- (Saudi Arabia) Mohammed Al-Khalifah (caretaker) (11 April 2009 – 30 May 2009)
- (Brazil) Mirandinha (1 July 2009 – 22 February 2010)
- (Saudi Arabia) Mohammed Al-Khalifah (caretaker) (22 February 2010 – 8 March 2010)
- (Tunisia) Zouhair Louati (8 March 2010 – 1 June 2011)
- (Brazil) Ednaldo Patricio Assistant coach Ricardo Barreto (27 June 2011 – 29 September 2012)
- (Brazil) Luiz Neto (caretaker) (29 September 2012 – 4 October 2012)
- (Egypt) Tarek Yehia (4 October 2012 – 1 May 2013)
- (Tunisia) Nacif Beyaoui (7 August 2013 – 20 September 2014)
- (Saudi Arabia) Abdullah Al-Janoubi (caretaker) (20 September 2014 – 27 September 2014)
- (Montenegro) Nebojša Jovović (27 September 2014 – 30 October 2015)
- (Saudi Arabia) Abdullah Al-Janoubi (caretaker) (30 October 2015 – 5 November 2015)
- (Belgium) Stéphane Demol (5 November 2015 – 8 March 2016)
- (Saudi Arabia) Abdullah Al-Janoubi (8 March 2016 – 30 May 2016)
- (Saudi Arabia) Sameer Hilal (7 August 2016 – 4 December 2016)
- (Egypt) Ahmed Fathallah (caretaker) (4 December 2016 – 18 December 2016)
- (Tunisia) Jamel Belhedi (18 December 2016 – 2 April 2017)
- (Tunisia) Mohamed Tamri (caretaker) (2 April 2017 – 6 May 2017)
- (Tunisia) Lotfi Sellimi (17 June 2017 – 8 February 2018)
- (Saudi Arabia) Abdullah Al-Janoubi (8 February 2018 – 6 February 2019)
- (Tunisia) Mohamed Maalej (13 February 2019 – 30 May 2019)
- (Tunisia) Mohamed Ayari (22 July 2019 – 30 May 2021)
- (North Macedonia) Gjoko Hadžievski (20 June 2021 – 31 May 2022)
- (Tunisia) Mohamed Ayari (17 June 2022 – 30 May 2023)
- (Croatia) Rodion Gačanin (19 June 2023 – 30 September 2023)
- (North Macedonia) Gjoko Hadžievski (30 September 2023 – 15 April 2024)
- (Saudi Arabia) Abdullah Al-Janoubi (15 April 2024 – 1 June 2024)
- (Tunisia) Afouène Gharbi (12 August 2024 – )

== See also ==
- List of football clubs in Saudi Arabia
