= 2021–22 Al-Fayha FC season =

Al-Fayha
2021–22 season
- President: Abdullah Abanmy
- Manager: Vuk Rašović
- Stadium: Al Majma'ah Sports City
- SPL: 10th
- King Cup: Winners
- Top goalscorer: League: Ramon Lopes (6 goals); All: Ramon Lopes (8 goals)
- Highest home attendance: 6,342 (vs. Damac, 23 May 2022)
- Lowest home attendance: 1,527 (vs. Al-Ittihad, 11 August 2021)
- Average home league attendance: 4,834
Home colours	Away colours	Third colours
- All statistics correct as of 27 June 2022.

The 2021–22 season was Al-Fayha's 68th year in their existence and their first season back in the Pro League following their promotion from the MS League in the previous season. The club participated in the Pro League and the King Cup.

The season covered the period from 1 July 2021 to 30 June 2022.

== Players ==
=== Squad information ===
As of 1 September 2021

Note: Flags indicate national team as defined under FIFA eligibility rules; some limited exceptions apply. Players may hold more than one non-FIFA nationality.

No.	Pos.	Nation	Player
1	GK	KSA	Moslem Al Freej
2	DF	KSA	Mukhair Al-Rashidi
3	DF	KSA	Bander Nasser
4	DF	KSA	Sami Al-Khaibari (captain)
6	MF	KSA	Yousef Al-Harbi (on loan from Al-Wehda)
7	FW	BRA	Ramon Lopes
8	MF	KSA	Abdulrahman Al-Safri
10	MF	KSA	Abdullah Al-Dossari
11	FW	KSA	Saqer Otaif
12	DF	KSA	Bander Al-Mutairi
15	MF	KSA	Ibrahim Al-Harbi
17	DF	KSA	Ali Al-Zubaidi
18	MF	KSA	Abdulmalek Al-Shammeri
19	MF	GHA	Samuel Owusu
20	MF	NIG	Amadou Moutari

No.	Pos.	Nation	Player
21	DF	GHA	John Boye
22	DF	KSA	Mohammed Al-Baqawi
23	GK	KSA	Marwan Al-Haidari (on loan from Al-Shabab)
24	DF	KSA	Ahmed Bamsaud
26	MF	KSA	Fawaz Al-Torais (on loan from Al-Hilal)
27	MF	KSA	Sultan Mandash
33	DF	KSA	Hussein Al-Shuwaish
37	MF	BRA	Ricardo Ryller
47	FW	KSA	Rayan Al-Bloushi (on loan from Al-Ettifaq)
64	DF	KSA	Sultan Al-Harbi
77	MF	GRE	Panagiotis Tachtsidis
81	MF	KSA	Ibrahim Al-Barakah (on loan from Al-Hazem)
88	GK	SRB	Vladimir Stojković
90	GK	KSA	Rashed Al-Mowainea
99	FW	KSA	Malek Al-Abdulmenem (on loan from Al-Taawoun)

=== Out on loan ===
Note: Flags indicate national team as defined under FIFA eligibility rules; some limited exceptions apply. Players may hold more than one non-FIFA nationality.

No. / Pos. / Nation / Player; 36 / DF / KSA / Hazaa Asiri (at Najran until 30 June 2022)	No. / Pos. / Nation / Player; — / DF / KSA / Naif Ahmed (at Tuwaiq until 30 June 2022)

== Transfers and loans ==
=== Transfers in ===
Entry date	Position	No.	Player	From club	Fee	Ref.
1 July 2021	DF	17	(Saudi Arabia) Ali Al-Zubaidi	(Saudi Arabia) Al-Wehda	Free	
1 July 2021	MF	8	(Saudi Arabia) Abdulrahman Al-Safri	(Saudi Arabia) Al-Qadsiah	Free	
1 July 2021	MF	27	(Saudi Arabia) Sultan Mandash	(Saudi Arabia) Al-Ahli	$800,000	
5 July 2021	DF	36	(Saudi Arabia) Hazaa Asiri	(Saudi Arabia) Najran	Free	
8 July 2021	DF	33	(Saudi Arabia) Hussein Al-Shuwaish	(Saudi Arabia) Al-Raed	Free	
16 July 2021	MF	77	(Greece) Panagiotis Tachtsidis	(Italy) Lecce	Free	
18 July 2021	DF	14	(Greece) Kyriakos Papadopoulos	(Croatia) Lokomotiva Zagreb	Free	
29 July 2021	FW	7	(Brazil) Ramon Lopes	(United Arab Emirates) Khor Fakkan	Free	
3 August 2021	MF	37	(Brazil) Ricardo Ryller	(Portugal) Braga	$770,000	
31 August 2021	DF	21	(Ghana) John Boye	(France) Metz	Free	
31 August 2021	MF	18	(Saudi Arabia) Abdulmalek Al-Shammeri	(Saudi Arabia) Al-Shabab	Undisclosed	
31 August 2021	MF	20	(Niger) Amadou Moutari	(Saudi Arabia) Al-Ain	Undisclosed	
14 January 2022	DF	–	(Saudi Arabia) Naif Almas	(Saudi Arabia) Al-Nassr	$186,000	
30 January 2022	MF	–	(Saudi Arabia) Ali Al-Nemer	(Saudi Arabia) Al-Taawoun	Free	
30 January 2022	MF	25	(Saudi Arabia) Ali Al-Zaqaan	(Saudi Arabia) Al-Fateh	Undisclosed	
30 January 2022	MF	66	(Saudi Arabia) Mohammed Abousaban	(Saudi Arabia) Al-Taawoun	Free	
30 January 2022	MF	92	(North Macedonia) Aleksandar Trajkovski	(Spain) Mallorca	Free	
30 January 2022	FW	99	(Saudi Arabia) Malek Al-Abdulmenem	(Saudi Arabia) Al-Taawoun	Undisclosed	

=== Loans in ===
Start date	End date	Position	No.	Player	From club	Fee	Ref.
1 July 2021	30 January 2022	FW	99	(Saudi Arabia) Malek Al-Abdulmenem	(Saudi Arabia) Al-Taawoun	None	
15 July 2021	End of season	MF	6	(Saudi Arabia) Yousef Al-Harbi	(Saudi Arabia) Al-Wehda	None	
28 July 2021	End of season	GK	88	(Serbia) Vladimir Stojković	(Serbia) Partizan	None	
7 August 2021	End of season	FW	9	(Brazil) Fernando Andrade	(Portugal) Porto	None	
24 August 2021	End of season	MF	26	(Saudi Arabia) Fawaz Al-Torais	(Saudi Arabia) Al-Hilal	None	
30 August 2021	End of season	GK	23	(Saudi Arabia) Marwan Al-Haidari	(Saudi Arabia) Al-Shabab	None	
30 August 2021	End of season	FW	47	(Saudi Arabia) Rayan Al-Bloushi	(Saudi Arabia) Al-Ettifaq	None	
31 August 2021	End of season	MF	81	(Saudi Arabia) Ibrahim Al-Barakah	(Saudi Arabia) Al-Hazem	None	

=== Transfers out ===
Exit date	Position	No.	Player	To club	Fee	Ref.
30 June 2021	GK	33	(Saudi Arabia) Mansour Jawhar	(Saudi Arabia) Abha	End of loan	
30 June 2021	MF	26	(Saudi Arabia) Munther Al-Nakhli	(Saudi Arabia) Al-Fateh	End of loan	
30 June 2021	MF	96	(Saudi Arabia) Abdulaziz Al-Dhuwayhi	(Saudi Arabia) Al-Ittihad	End of loan	
30 June 2021	FW	99	(Saudi Arabia) Safi Al-Zaqrati	(Saudi Arabia) Al-Ahli	End of loan	
1 July 2021	DF	6	(Saudi Arabia) Abdullah Al-Dawsari	(Saudi Arabia) Al-Shoulla	Free	
1 July 2021	MF	50	(Saudi Arabia) Talal Majrashi	(Saudi Arabia) Damac	Free	
5 July 2021	MF	8	(Saudi Arabia) Faisal Al-Johani	(Saudi Arabia) Al-Jabalain	Free	
12 July 2021	FW	9	(Saudi Arabia) Hamad Al-Juhaim	(Saudi Arabia) Ohod	Free	
27 July 2021	FW	25	(Nigeria) Tunde Adeniji	(Saudi Arabia) Al-Adalah	Free	
30 July 2021	GK	–	(Saudi Arabia) Haitham Mohammed	(Saudi Arabia) Afif	Free	
17 August 2021	DF	5	(Ivory Coast) Soualio Ouattara	(Saudi Arabia) Al-Wehda	Free	
20 August 2021	MF	20	(Saudi Arabia) Hussain Al-Sheikh	(Saudi Arabia) Al-Taraji	Free	
31 August 2021	DF	14	(Greece) Kyriakos Papadopoulos		Released	
1 September 2021	MF	18	(Saudi Arabia) Hassan Jaafari	(Saudi Arabia) Hajer	Free	
3 September 2021	GK	27	(Saudi Arabia) Khaled Al-Muqaitib	(Saudi Arabia) Al-Najma	Free	
3 September 2021	MF	42	(Nigeria) Reuben Gabriel	(Saudi Arabia) Al-Ain	Free	
3 September 2021	MF	66	(Saudi Arabia) Ahmed Al-Suhail	(Saudi Arabia) Al-Ain	Free	
5 September 2021	MF	–	(Saudi Arabia) Omar Al-Juwair	(Saudi Arabia) Al-Diriyah	Free	
10 September 2021	DF	17	(Saudi Arabia) Ziyad Al-Jarrad	(Saudi Arabia) Al-Khaleej	Free	
10 September 2021	DF	67	(Mali) Anas Traoré		Released	
29 January 2022	MF	77	(Saudi Arabia) Abdullah Al-Tofail	(Saudi Arabia) Al-Shoulla	Free	
29 January 2022	FW	11	(Saudi Arabia) Saqer Otaif	(Saudi Arabia) Al-Qadsiah	Free	
30 January 2022	DF	17	(Saudi Arabia) Ali Al-Zubaidi	(Saudi Arabia) Al-Fateh	Free	
30 January 2022	DF	21	(Ghana) John Boye		Released	

=== Loans out ===
Start date	End date	Position	No.	Player	To club	Fee	Ref.
9 September 2021	End of season	DF	36	(Saudi Arabia) Hazaa Asiri	(Saudi Arabia) Najran	None	
10 September 2021	End of season	DF	–	(Saudi Arabia) Naif Ahmed	(Saudi Arabia) Al-Zulfi	None	
10 January 2022	End of season	DF	64	(Saudi Arabia) Sultan Al-Harbi	(Saudi Arabia) Bisha	None	
26 January 2022	End of season	MF	15	(Saudi Arabia) Ibrahim Al-Harbi	(Saudi Arabia) Al-Jabalain	None	

== Pre-season ==
16 July 2021 Friendly	Al-Fayha (Saudi Arabia)	2–3	(Serbia) FK Brodarac	Stara Pazova, Serbia
18:00 CEST	Owusu 5' (pen.); Al-Dawsari 22'	Report	Vukosavljević 38'; Đilas 62'; Tabakovic 82'	Stadium: Sports Center FAS

20 July 2021 Friendly	Al-Fayha (Saudi Arabia)	5–1	(Serbia) FK Kolubara	Stara Pazova, Serbia
18:00 CEST	Al-Abdulmenem 11'; Tachtsidis 28'; Owusu 32', 55'; Otaif 90' (pen.)	Report	63'	Stadium: Sports Center FAS

24 July 2021 Friendly	Al-Fayha (Saudi Arabia)	2–0	(Serbia) FK IMT	Stara Pazova, Serbia
17:30 CEST	Owusu 25', 27'	Report		Stadium: Sports Center FAS

27 July 2021 Friendly	Al-Fayha (Saudi Arabia)	3–2	(United Arab Emirates) Ajman	Stara Pazova, Serbia
17:30 CEST	Tachtsidis 6'; Mandash 23'; Al-Abdulmenem 41'	Report	Trawally; Ben Larbi	Stadium: Sports Center FAS

5 August 2021 Friendly	Al-Shabab (Saudi Arabia)	1–1	(Saudi Arabia) Al-Fayha	Riyadh, Saudi Arabia
19:20 AST	Banega 77'	Report	Owusu 73'	Stadium: Prince Khalid bin Sultan Stadium

== Competitions ==
=== Overview ===
Competition	Record							
Competition	G	W	D	L	GF	GA	GD	Win %
Pro League	30	8	11	11	21	24	−3	26.67
King Cup	4	3	1	0	8	2	+6	75.00
Total	34	11	12	11	29	26	+3	32.35

Updated to match played 27 June 2022
Source: Competitions

=== Pro League ===
==== League table ====
Pos	Team	Pld	W	D	L	GF	GA	GD	Pts	Qualification or relegation
8	Al-Fateh	30	9	8	13	45	41	+4	35 (Note: Head-to-head points: Al-Fateh 5, Abha 5, Al-Fayha 4. Head-to-head goal difference: Al-Fateh +1, Abha –1.)	
9	Abha	30	9	8	13	27	43	−16	35	
10	Al-Fayha	30	8	11	11	21	24	−3	35	Qualification for AFC Champions League group stage (Note: Al-Fayha qualified for the AFC Champions League play-off round as 2021–22 King Cup winners.)
11	Al-Ettifaq	30	8	10	12	40	47	−7	34 (Note: Head-to-head points: Al-Ettifaq 3, Al-Taawoun 3. Head-to-head goal difference: Al-Ettifaq +2, Al-Taawoun –2.)	
12	Al-Taawoun	30	7	13	10	43	48	−5	34	

Source: spl.com
Rules for classification: 1) Points; 2) Head-to-head points; 3) Head-to-head goal difference; 4) Total goal difference; 5) Total goals scored; 6) Fair-play points (Note: Head-to-head record is used only after all the matches between the teams in question have been played).

==== Results summary ====
Overall								Home						Away					
Pld	W	D	L	GF	GA	GD	Pts	W	D	L	GF	GA	GD	W	D	L	GF	GA	GD
30	8	11	11	21	24	−3	35	7	5	3	11	5	+6	1	6	8	10	19	−9

Last updated: 27 June 2022.
Source: spl.com.sa

==== Results by round ====
Round	1	2	3	4	5	6	7	8	9	10	11	12	13	14	15	16	17	18	19	20	21	22	23	24	25	26	27	28	29	30
Ground	H	A	A	A	A	H	A	H	A	H	H	A	A	H	A	A	H	H	H	H	A	H	A	H	A	A	H	H	A	H
Result	W	D	W	D	L	W	L	W	L	D	W	L	D	D	D	L	D	W	W	D	D	L	L	W	L	L	D	L	D	L
Position	6	4	1	3	6	5	6	3	5	5	5	6	5	7	6	7	7	6	6	7	7	8	9	8	8	6	6	7	7	10

Updated to match(es) played on 27 June 2022. Source: spl.com.sa
A = Away; H = Home; W = Win; D = Draw; L = Loss

==== Matches ====
All times are local, AST (UTC+3).

Win Draw Loss Postponed

11 August 2021 1	Al-Fayha	1–0	Al-Ittihad	Al Majma'ah
19:15	Owusu (yellow card) 21'; Tachtsidis 35'; Al-Safri (yellow card) 43'; Stojković (yellow card) 89'	Report		Stadium: Al Majma'ah Sports City; Attendance: 1,527; Referee: Turki Al-Khudhayr

21 August 2021 2	Al-Fateh	1–1	Al-Fayha	Al-Hasa
18:50	Bendebka 23'; Batna (yellow card) 54'; Buhimed (yellow card) 60'; Saâdane (yellow card) 88'	Report	Lopes 26'; Bamsaud (yellow card) 38'; Stojković (yellow card) 90+1'	Stadium: Prince Abdullah bin Jalawi Stadium; Attendance: 1,392; Referee: Abdullah Al-Harbi

27 August 2021 3	Al-Tai	1–3	Al-Fayha	Ha'il
19:15	Musona 45' (pen.); Marcelo (yellow card) 61'	Report	Lopes 37' (pen.); Bamsaud 40'; Stojković (yellow card) 43'; Nasser (yellow card) 59'; Al-Abdulmenem (yellow card) 84', (goal) 85'	Stadium: Prince Abdul Aziz bin Musa'ed Stadium; Attendance: 3,100; Referee: Mohammed Al-Beredi

16 September 2021 5	Al-Faisaly	2–1	Al-Fayha	Al Majma'ah
20:30	Amalfitano 9'; Kaabi (yellow card) 46'; Faik (yellow card) 57'; Tavares 77'; Guilherme (red card) 90+7'	Report	Y. Al-Harbi (yellow card) 42'; Tachtsidis (yellow card) 57'; Mandash 87'	Stadium: Al Majma'ah Sports City; Attendance: 3,101; Referee: Khaled Al-Teris

23 September 2021 6	Al-Fayha	2–0	Al-Ahli	Al Majma'ah
18:30	Al-Khaibari (yellow card) 35'; Lopes 60', 68'	Report	Al-Mousa (yellow card) 51'	Stadium: Al Majma'ah Sports City; Attendance: 4,100; Referee: Shukri Al-Hanfoush

1 October 2021 7	Al-Shabab	2–1	Al-Fayha	Riyadh
18:20	Carlos 23'; Sharahili 27'; Al-Harbi (yellow card) 57'	Report	Al-Khaibari (yellow card) 1'; Lopes 9'; Al-Safri (yellow card) 40'; Mandash (yellow card) 90+5'	Stadium: Prince Faisal bin Fahd Stadium; Attendance: 3,595; Referee: Khaled Salwi

16 October 2021 8	Al-Fayha	1–0	Al-Raed	Al Majma'ah
18:05	Lopes 35'; Ryller (yellow card) 90'	Report		Stadium: Al Majma'ah Sports City; Attendance: 3,792; Referee: Mohammed Al-Hoaish

21 October 2021 9	Al-Batin	2–0	Al-Fayha	Hafar al-Batin
17:55	M. Al-Qarni (yellow card) 20'; Sami (yellow card) 26'; Al-Shammari 39'; Chaves 45+3'; Al-Hurayji (yellow card) 87'; Al-Alawi (yellow card) 90'	Report	Al-Rashidi (yellow card) 60'	Stadium: Al-Batin Club Stadium; Attendance: 4,228; Referee: Abdullah Al-Shehri

30 October 2021 10	Al-Fayha	1–1	Al-Nassr	Al Majma'ah
19:50	Moutari (yellow card) 21'; Al-Safri (yellow card) 27'; Al-Abdulmenem 84'	Report	Al-Najei 17'; Asiri (yellow card) 53'	Stadium: Al Majma'ah Sports City; Attendance: 6,136; Referee: Piero Maza (Chile)

5 November 2021 11	Al-Fayha	1–0	Al-Hazem	Al Majma'ah
17:55	Bamsaud (yellow card) 25'; Tachtsidis (yellow card) 64'; Moutari 73'; Mandash (yellow card) 87'	Report	Al-Obaid (yellow card) 33'; Alison (yellow card) 83'; Al-Harthi (yellow card) 87'	Stadium: Al Majma'ah Sports City; Attendance: 6,122; Referee: Mohammed Al-Qarni

20 November 2021 12	Damac	1–0	Al-Fayha	Abha
15:30	Majrashi (yellow card) 38'; Vittor (yellow card) 62'; Chafaï 83'	Report	Tachtsidis (red card) 21'; Moutari (yellow card) 46'; Al-Safri (yellow card) 58'; Al-Baqawi (yellow card) 90+5'	Stadium: Prince Sultan bin Abdul Aziz Stadium; Attendance: 1,101; Referee: Faisal Al-Blwi

26 November 2021 13	Al-Taawoun	1–1	Al-Fayha	Buraidah
17:50	Luvannor 81'; Al-Nabit (yellow card) 90+4'	Report	Bamsaud (yellow card) 41'; Al-Khaibari 90+5'	Stadium: King Abdullah Sport City Stadium; Attendance: 2,188; Referee: Victor Gomes (South Africa)

10 December 2021 4	Al-Hilal	0–0	Al-Fayha	Riyadh
17:40	Kanno (yellow card) 25'	Report	Ryller (yellow card) 34'; Al-Rashidi (yellow card) 90+2'; Al-Safri (yellow card) 90+4'	Stadium: King Fahd International Stadium; Attendance: 13,880; Referee: Ilgiz Tantashev (Uzbekistan)

25 December 2021 14	Al-Fayha	0–0	Abha	Al Majma'ah
17:55	Ryller (yellow card) 45'; Al-Safri (yellow card) 51'	Report	Atouchi (yellow card) 48'	Stadium: Al Majma'ah Sports City; Attendance: 6,116; Referee: Mohammed Al-Qarni

31 December 2021 15	Al-Ettifaq	1–1	Al-Fayha	Dammam
17:35	Sliti 84'; Al-Rubaie (yellow card) 90+5'	Report	Al-Abdulmenem 33'; Al-Baqawi (yellow card) 90+5'	Stadium: Prince Mohamed bin Fahd Stadium; Attendance: 3,722; Referee: Sultan Al-Harbi

7 January 2022 16	Al-Ittihad	2–0	Al-Fayha	Jeddah
19:55	Al-Muwallad (yellow card) 6'; Hawsawi 34'; Romarinho 67'	Report	Mandash (yellow card) 72'	Stadium: King Abdullah Sports City; Attendance: 26,191; Referee: Clément Turpin (France)

13 January 2022 17	Al-Fayha	0–0	Al-Fateh	Al Majma'ah
15:30		Report	Saâdane (yellow card) 30'; Al-Jari (yellow card) 55'; Al-Bahrani (yellow card) 87'	Stadium: Al Majma'ah Sports City; Attendance: 3,350; Referee: Khaled Al-Teris

22 January 2022 18	Al-Fayha	2–0	Al-Tai	Al Majma'ah
15:35	Al-Abdulmenem 9', (yellow card) 64'; Moutari (yellow card) 16', (goal) 49'; Mandash (yellow card) 36'	Report	Bajandouh (yellow card) 35'; Al-Johani (yellow card) 45'	Stadium: Al Majma'ah Sports City; Attendance: 3,299; Referee: Faisal Al-Blwi

10 February 2022 20	Al-Fayha	0–0	Al-Faisaly	Al Majma'ah
20:20	Al-Rashidi (yellow card) 74'	Report	Boyle (yellow card) 17'; I. Rossi (yellow card) 47'	Stadium: Al Majma'ah Sports City; Attendance: 3,468; Referee: Mohammed Al-Hoaish

17 February 2022 21	Al-Ahli	1–1	Al-Fayha	Jeddah
18:55	Kom (yellow card) 40'; Asiri (yellow card) 87'; Alioski 90+5' (pen.)	Report	Al-Safri (yellow card) 26'; Al-Shuwaish (yellow card) 59'; Mandash 60'; Tachtsidis (yellow card) 90+8'	Stadium: Prince Abdullah Al-Faisal Stadium; Attendance: 7,031; Referee: Ahmed Al-Rumaikhani

27 February 2022 22	Al-Fayha	1–2	Al-Shabab	Al Majma'ah
20:40	Al-Safri 58'	Report	Mary 41'; Paulinho (yellow card) 51'; Al-Harbi (yellow card) 64'; Al-Abed 80'	Stadium: Al Majma'ah Sports City; Attendance: 3,327; Referee: Abdullah Al-Harbi

5 March 2022 23	Al-Raed	1–0	Al-Fayha	Buraidah
18:45	Eder 21'; Fouzair (yellow card) 56'; Atsu (yellow card) 72'; El Berkaoui (yellow card) 83'; Al-Rehaili (yellow card) 90+4'	Report	Tachtsidis (yellow card) 76'; Al-Rashidi (yellow card) 88'	Stadium: King Abdullah Sport City Stadium; Attendance: 5,896; Referee: Sultan Al-Okairy

11 March 2022 24	Al-Fayha	1–0	Al-Batin	Al Majma'ah
18:45	Lopes (yellow card) 59'; Al-Torais 85'	Report	Al-Aryani (red card) 33'	Stadium: Al Majma'ah Sports City; Attendance: 6,191; Referee: Mohammed Al-Beredi

17 March 2022 25	Al-Nassr	1–0	Al-Fayha	Riyadh
20:50	Masharipov 74', (yellow card) 85'; Qassem (yellow card) 90+9'	Report	Bamsaud (yellow card) 25'; Abousaban (red card) 44'; Al-Abdulmenem (yellow card) 81'; Tachtsidis (yellow card) 90+8'	Stadium: Mrsool Park; Attendance: 0 Referee: Raed Al-Zahrani

3 May 2022 19	Al-Fayha	1–0	Al-Hilal	Al Majma'ah
19:10	Al-Khaibari 33'; Ryller (yellow card) 90'; Al-Baqawi (yellow card) 90+6'	Report	Michael (yellow card) 84'; Cuéllar (yellow card) 90+6'	Stadium: Al Majma'ah Sports City; Attendance: 6,150; Referee: Majed Al-Shamrani

7 May 2022 26	Al-Hazem	3–1	Al-Fayha	Ar Rass
19:20	Al-Otaibi 17'; Neris (yellow card) 54'; Zerhouni 59'; Al-Obaid (yellow card) 83'; Stojanović 90+6'	Report	Al-Safri (yellow card) 42'; Trajkovski 45', (yellow card) 90+4'; Al-Baqawi (yellow card) 49'	Stadium: Al-Hazem Club Stadium; Attendance: 609; Referee: Faisal Al-Blwi

23 May 2022 27	Al-Fayha	0–0	Damac	Al Majma'ah
19:20	Abousaban (yellow card) 74'	Report	Nono (yellow card) 31'; Al-Najjar (yellow card) 90+4'	Stadium: Al Majma'ah Sports City; Attendance: 6,342; Referee: Abdullah Al-Kharbosh

29 May 2022 28	Al-Fayha	0–1	Al-Taawoun	Al Majma'ah
19:20		Report	Tawamba 19'	Stadium: Al Majma'ah Sports City; Attendance: 6,293; Referee: Sultan Al-Harbi

23 June 2022 29	Abha	0–0	Al-Fayha	Abha
21:00		Report	Al-Baqawi (yellow card) 40'; Lopes (yellow card) 84'	Stadium: Prince Sultan bin Abdul Aziz Stadium; Attendance: 667; Referee: Khaled Al-Teris

27 June 2022 30	Al-Fayha	0–1	Al-Ettifaq	Al Majma'ah
21:00	Al-Shuwaish (yellow card) 3'; Al-Baqawi (yellow card) 68'	Report	Quaison (yellow card) 47'; Al-Kuwaykibi 57'; Al Salem (yellow card) 88'; M'Bolhi (yellow card) 90+2'	Stadium: Al Majma'ah Sports City; Attendance: 6,284; Referee: Sultan Al-Harbi

=== King Cup ===
All times are local, AST (UTC+3).

21 December 2021 Round of 16	Al-Fayha	4–0	Abha	Al Majma'ah
15:05	Tachtsidis 19' (pen.); Ryller (yellow card) 25'; Moutari (yellow card) 39', (goal) 47'; Al-Abdulmenem 44'; Lopes 83'	Report	Mboungou (yellow card) 18'; Atouchi (yellow card) 89'	Stadium: Al Majma'ah Sports City; Referee: Mohammed Al-Harbi

21 February 2022 Quarter-finals	Al-Batin	1–2	Al-Fayha	Hafar al-Batin
15:55	El Jebli 66' (pen.); Sami (yellow card) 72'; Antônio (yellow card) 77'; Campaña (yellow card) 116'	Report	Trajkovski 56'; Bamsaud (yellow card) 70'; Al-Baqawi (yellow card) 94'; Tachtsidis 117'	Stadium: Al-Batin Club Stadium; Referee: Raed Al-Zahrani

4 April 2022 Semi-finals	Al-Fayha	1–0	Al-Ittihad	Al Majma'ah
22:00	Abousaban 36'	Report		Stadium: Al Majma'ah Sports City; Referee: Slavko Vinčić (Slovenia)

19 May 2022 Final	Al-Fayha	1–1 (a.e.t.) (3–1 p)	Al Hilal	Jeddah
21:30	Lopes 66'; Stojković (yellow card) 90+4'; Al-Shuwaish (yellow card) 120+1'	Report	S. Al-Dawsari (yellow card) 37', (goal) 45+4'; Al-Faraj (yellow card) 105'; Jahfali (yellow card) 105'	Stadium: King Abdullah Sports City; Attendance: 46,533; Referee: Antonio Mateu Lahoz (Spain)
	Penalties
	Ryller (penalty missed); Lopes (penalty scored); Al-Zaqaan (penalty scored); Al-Shuwaish (penalty missed); Tachtsidis (penalty scored)		(penalty missed) Ighalo; (penalty missed) Al-Faraj; (penalty missed) Al-Hamdan; (penalty scored) Al-Juwayr

== Statistics ==
=== Appearances ===
Last updated on 27 June 2022.

No.	Pos	Nat	Player	Total		Pro League		King Cup	
No.	Pos	Nat	Player	Apps	Goals	Apps	Goals	Apps	Goals
Goalkeepers
1	GK	(Saudi Arabia) KSA	Moslem Al Freej	1	0	1	0	0	0
88	GK	(Serbia) SRB	Vladimir Stojković	33	0	29	0	4	0
Defenders
2	DF	(Saudi Arabia) KSA	Mukhair Al-Rashidi	24	0	18+3	0	2+1	0
3	DF	(Saudi Arabia) KSA	Bander Nasser	18	0	8+8	0	1+1	0
4	DF	(Saudi Arabia) KSA	Sami Al-Khaibari	32	2	29	2	3	0
22	DF	(Saudi Arabia) KSA	Mohammed Al-Baqawi	27	0	15+8	0	2+2	0
24	DF	(Saudi Arabia) KSA	Ahmed Bamsaud	33	1	26+3	1	4	0
33	DF	(Saudi Arabia) KSA	Hussein Al-Shuwaish	31	0	26+1	0	4	0
Midfielders
6	MF	(Saudi Arabia) KSA	Yousef Al-Harbi	14	0	2+11	0	0+1	0
8	MF	(Saudi Arabia) KSA	Abdulrahman Al-Safri	30	1	25+2	1	2+1	0
10	MF	(Saudi Arabia) KSA	Abdullah Al-Dossari	3	0	0+3	0	0	0
16	MF	(Saudi Arabia) KSA	Ali Al-Nemer	4	0	2+2	0	0	0
18	MF	(Saudi Arabia) KSA	Abdulmalek Al-Shammeri	1	0	0+1	0	0	0
19	MF	(Ghana) GHA	Samuel Owusu	22	0	16+5	0	0+1	0
20	MF	(Niger) NIG	Amadou Moutari	30	3	17+9	2	1+3	1
25	MF	(Saudi Arabia) KSA	Ali Al-Zaqaan	14	0	3+9	0	1+1	0
26	MF	(Saudi Arabia) KSA	Fawaz Al-Torais	13	1	1+10	1	0+2	0
27	MF	(Saudi Arabia) KSA	Sultan Mandash	32	2	18+10	2	4	0
37	MF	(Brazil) BRA	Ricardo Ryller	31	0	27	0	4	0
66	MF	(Saudi Arabia) KSA	Mohammed Abousaban	13	1	4+6	0	3	1
77	MF	(Greece) GRE	Panagiotis Tachtsidis	32	3	27+1	1	4	2
81	MF	(Saudi Arabia) KSA	Ibrahim Al-Barakah	8	0	0+6	0	0+2	0
92	MF	(North Macedonia) MKD	Aleksandar Trajkovski	12	2	5+4	1	2+1	1
Forwards
7	FW	(Brazil) BRA	Ramon Lopes	29	8	21+4	6	1+3	2
47	FW	(Saudi Arabia) KSA	Rayan Al-Bloushi	1	0	0+1	0	0	0
99	FW	(Saudi Arabia) KSA	Malek Al-Abdulmenem	25	5	8+14	4	2+1	1
Players sent out on loan this season
15	MF	(Saudi Arabia) KSA	Ibrahim Al-Harbi	3	0	0+3	0	0	0
36	DF	(Saudi Arabia) KSA	Hazaa Asiri	0	0	0	0	0	0
64	DF	(Saudi Arabia) KSA	Sultan Al-Harbi	0	0	0	0	0	0
Player who made an appearance this season but have left the club
9	FW	(Brazil) BRA	Fernando Andrade	1	0	1	0	0	0
11	FW	(Saudi Arabia) KSA	Saqer Otaif	1	0	0+1	0	0	0
14	DF	(Greece) GRE	Kyriakos Papadopoulos	1	0	0+1	0	0	0
17	DF	(Saudi Arabia) KSA	Ali Al-Zubaidi	2	0	0+2	0	0	0
21	DF	(Ghana) GHA	John Boye	5	0	1+3	0	0+1	0

=== Goalscorers ===
Rank	No.	Pos	Nat	Name	Pro League	King Cup	Total
1	7	FW	(Brazil)	Ramon Lopes	6	2	8
2	99	FW	(Saudi Arabia)	Malek Al-Abdulmenem	4	1	5
3	20	MF	(Niger)	Amadou Moutari	2	1	3
3	77	MF	(Greece)	Panagiotis Tachtsidis	1	2	3
5	4	DF	(Saudi Arabia)	Sami Al-Khaibari	2	0	2
5	27	MF	(Saudi Arabia)	Sultan Mandash	2	0	2
5	92	MF	(North Macedonia)	Aleksandar Trajkovski	1	1	2
8	8	MF	(Saudi Arabia)	Abdulrahman Al-Safri	1	0	1
8	24	DF	(Saudi Arabia)	Ahmed Bamsaud	1	0	1
8	26	MF	(Saudi Arabia)	Fawaz Al-Torais	1	0	1
8	66	MF	(Saudi Arabia)	Mohammed Abousaban	0	1	1
Own goal					0	0	0
Total					21	8	29

Last Updated: 19 May 2022

=== Assists ===
Rank	No.	Pos	Nat	Name	Pro League	King Cup	Total
1	77	MF	(Greece)	Panagiotis Tachtsidis	9	1	10
2	19	MF	(Ghana)	Samuel Owusu	4	0	4
3	99	FW	(Saudi Arabia)	Malek Al-Abdulmenem	0	2	2
4	8	MF	(Saudi Arabia)	Abdulrahman Al-Safri	1	0	1
4	22	DF	(Saudi Arabia)	Mohammed Al-Baqawi	1	0	1
4	27	MF	(Saudi Arabia)	Sultan Mandash	1	0	1
4	37	MF	(Brazil)	Ricardo Ryller	1	0	1
4	92	MF	(North Macedonia)	Aleksandar Trajkovski	1	0	1
Total					18	3	21

Last Updated: 7 May 2022

=== Clean sheets ===
Rank	No.	Pos	Nat	Name	Pro League	King Cup	Total
1	88	GK	(Serbia)	Vladimir Stojković	13	2	15
Total					13	2	15

Last Updated: 23 June 2022
