= 2020–21 Al-Fayha FC season =

Al-Fayha
2020–21 season
- President: Abdullah Abanmy
- Manager: Al-Habib bin Ramadan
- Stadium: Al Majma'ah Sports City
- MS League: 2nd (promoted)
- Top goalscorer: League: Tunde Adeniji (11); All: Tunde Adeniji (11)
- All statistics correct as of 31 May 2021.

The 2020–21 season was Al-Fayha's 67th year in their existence and their first back season in the MS League. Al-Fayha were relegated to the second tier of Saudi football after finishing 14th in the 2019–20 Saudi Pro League. The club participated in the MS League only following the Saudi FF's decision to reduce the number of teams in the King Cup.

The season covered the period from 22 September 2020 to 30 June 2021.

== Players ==
=== Squad information ===
As of 9 February 2021

Note: Flags indicate national team as defined under FIFA eligibility rules; some limited exceptions apply. Players may hold more than one non-FIFA nationality.

No.	Pos.	Nation	Player
1	GK	KSA	Moslem Al Freej
2	DF	KSA	Mukhair Al-Rashidi
3	DF	KSA	Bander Nasser
4	DF	KSA	Sami Al-Khaibari (captain)
5	DF	CIV	Soualio Ouattara
6	DF	KSA	Abdullah Al-Dawsari
7	MF	KSA	Abdullah Al-Dossari
8	MF	KSA	Faisal Al-Johani
9	FW	KSA	Hamad Al-Juhaim
12	DF	KSA	Bander Al-Mutairi
15	MF	KSA	Ibrahim Al-Harbi
17	DF	KSA	Ziyad Al-Jarrad
18	MF	KSA	Hassan Jaafari
19	MF	GHA	Samuel Owusu
20	MF	KSA	Hussain Al-Sheikh
22	DF	KSA	Mohammed Al-Baqawi

No.	Pos.	Nation	Player
24	DF	KSA	Ahmed Bamsaud
25	FW	NGR	Tunde Adeniji
26	MF	KSA	Munther Al-Nakhli (on loan from Al-Fateh)
27	GK	KSA	Khaled Al Muqaitib
30	FW	KSA	Saqer Otaif
33	GK	KSA	Mansour Jawhar (on loan from Abha)
42	MF	NGR	Reuben Gabriel
50	MF	KSA	Talal Majrashi
64	DF	KSA	Sultan Al-Harbi
66	MF	KSA	Ahmed Al-Suhail
67	DF	MLI	Anas Traoré
77	MF	KSA	Abdullah Al-Tofail
90	GK	KSA	Rashed Al-Mowainea
96	MF	KSA	Abdulaziz Al-Dhuwayhi (on loan from Al-Ittihad)
99	FW	KSA	Safi Al-Zaqrati (on loan from Al-Ahli)

== Transfers and loans ==
=== Transfers in ===
Entry date	Position	No.	Player	From club	Fee	Ref.
22 September 2020	DF	32	(Saudi Arabia) Omar Al-Muziel	(Saudi Arabia) Abha	End of loan	
1 October 2020	DF	5	(Ivory Coast) Soualio Ouattara	(Saudi Arabia) Al-Ain	Free	
1 October 2020	MF	8	(Saudi Arabia) Faisal Al-Johani	(Saudi Arabia) Najran	Free	
1 October 2020	MF	10	(Tunisia) Youssef Fouzai	(Saudi Arabia) Al-Adalah	Free	
1 October 2020	MF	66	(Saudi Arabia) Ahmed Al-Suhail	(Saudi Arabia) Najran	Free	
3 October 2020	DF	17	(Saudi Arabia) Ziyad Al-Jarrad	(Saudi Arabia) Al-Ain	Free	
5 October 2020	MF	7	(Saudi Arabia) Abdullah Al-Dossari	(Saudi Arabia) Al-Batin	Free	
7 October 2020	MF	11	(Egypt) Tarek El Agami	(Saudi Arabia) Ohod	Free	
9 October 2020	DF	22	(Saudi Arabia) Mohammed Al-Baqawi	(Saudi Arabia) Al-Shabab	$400,000	
9 October 2020	FW	70	(Brazil) William Oliveira	(Saudi Arabia) Al-Faisaly	Free	
10 October 2020	MF	15	(Saudi Arabia) Ibrahim Al-Harbi	(Saudi Arabia) Al-Ansar	Free	
17 October 2020	GK	27	(Saudi Arabia) Khaled Al Muqaitib	(Saudi Arabia) Al-Raed	Free	
25 October 2020	MF	42	(Nigeria) Reuben Gabriel	(Saudi Arabia) Abha	Free	
25 October 2020	MF	77	(Saudi Arabia) Abdullah Al-Tofail	(Saudi Arabia) Al-Shoulla	Free	
4 February 2021	MF	–	(Saudi Arabia) Mohammed Al-Motawaa	(Saudi Arabia) Ohod	Free	
7 February 2021	DF	67	(Mali) Anas Traoré	(Saudi Arabia) Al-Wehda	Free	
7 February 2021	MF	20	(Saudi Arabia) Hussain Al-Sheikh	(Saudi Arabia) Al-Sahel	Free	
7 February 2021	FW	25	(Nigeria) Tunde Adeniji	(China) Kunshan	Free	
7 February 2021	FW	30	(Saudi Arabia) Saqer Otaif	(Saudi Arabia) Al-Fateh	Free	

=== Loans in ===
Start date	End date	Position	No.	Player	From club	Fee	Ref.
7 October 2020	End of season	MF	26	(Saudi Arabia) Munther Al-Nakhli	(Saudi Arabia) Al-Fateh	None	
18 October 2020	End of season	GK	33	(Saudi Arabia) Mansor Joher	(Saudi Arabia) Abha	None	
20 October 2020	End of season	FW	99	(Saudi Arabia) Safi Al-Zaqrati	(Saudi Arabia) Al-Ahli	None	
16 January 2021	End of season	MF	96	(Saudi Arabia) Abdulaziz Al-Dhuwayhi	(Saudi Arabia) Al-Ittihad	None	

=== Transfers out ===
Exit date	Position	No.	Player	To club	Fee	Ref.
22 September 2020	GK	99	(Jordan) Amer Shafi		Released	
22 September 2020	DF	6	(Cape Verde) Gegé		End of contract	
22 September 2020	DF	17	(Saudi Arabia) Hani Al-Sebyani	(Saudi Arabia) Al-Ahli	End of loan	
22 September 2020	DF	23	(Saudi Arabia) Awn Al-Saluli	(Saudi Arabia) Al-Ittihad	End of loan	
22 September 2020	DF	33	(Saudi Arabia) Mohammed Al-Baqawi	(Saudi Arabia) Al-Shabab	End of loan	
22 September 2020	MF	8	(Brazil) Ângelo Neto	(Portugal) São Caetano	End of loan	
22 September 2020	MF	12	(Saudi Arabia) Abdulkareem Al-Qahtani	(Saudi Arabia) Al-Fayha	Free	
22 September 2020	MF	20	(Chile) Carlos Villanueva	(Chile) Palestino	Free	
22 September 2020	MF	77	(Portugal) Arsénio		End of contract	
22 September 2020	FW	7	(Chad) Othman Alhaj	(Saudi Arabia) Al-Ahli	End of loan	
3 October 2020	MF	16	(Saudi Arabia) Abdulrahman Al-Barakah	(Saudi Arabia) Abha	Free	
3 October 2020	FW	9	(Chile) Ronnie Fernández		Released	
5 October 2020	FW	28	(Madagascar) Faneva Andriatsima	(United Arab Emirates) Al-Hamriyah	Free	
6 October 2020	DF	32	(Saudi Arabia) Omar Al-Muziel	(Saudi Arabia) Damac	Undisclosed	
15 October 2020	GK	35	(Saudi Arabia) Hamad Hawsawi	(Saudi Arabia) Al-Nojoom	Free	
17 October 2020	DF	27	(Saudi Arabia) Abdullah Kanno	(Saudi Arabia) Al-Kawkab	Free	
21 October 2020	DF	55	(Saudi Arabia) Nawaf Al-Sobhi	(Saudi Arabia) Al-Taawoun	Undisclosed	
21 October 2020	MF	14	(Saudi Arabia) Mohanad Fallatah	(Saudi Arabia) Damac	Undisclosed	
1 November 2020	MF	21	(Saudi Arabia) Muhannad Awadh	(Saudi Arabia) Al-Bukayriyah	Free	
27 January 2021	FW	70	(Brazil) William Alves		Released	
31 January 2021	MF	11	(Egypt) Tarek El Agamy		Released	
9 February 2021	MF	10	(Tunisia) Youssef Fouzai		Released	

=== Loans out ===
Start date	End date	Position	No.	Player	To club	Fee	Ref.
25 October 2020	25 January 2021	MF	19	(Ghana) Samuel Owusu	(Saudi Arabia) Al-Ahli	None	

== Pre-season ==
12 October 2020 Friendly	Al-Fayha (Saudi Arabia)	1–1	(Saudi Arabia) Arar	Al Majma'ah, Saudi Arabia
18:10 AST	Alves 60' (pen.)	Report	Al-Enezi 27' (pen.)	Stadium: Al Majma'ah Sports City

15 October 2020 Friendly	Al-Fayha (Saudi Arabia)	4–1	(Saudi Arabia) Arar	Al Majma'ah, Saudi Arabia
18:10 AST	Alves; Al-Nakhli; Al-Juhaim	Report	Ferjaoui	Stadium: Al-Fayha Club Stadium

== Competitions ==
=== MS League ===
==== League table ====
Pos	Team	Pld	W	D	L	GF	GA	GD	Pts	Promotion, qualification or relegation
1	Al-Hazem (C, P)	38	28	7	3	77	27	+50	91	Promotion to the Pro League
2	Al-Fayha (P)	38	24	9	5	72	27	+45	81	Promotion to the Pro League
3	Al-Tai (P)	38	23	8	7	58	33	+25	77	Promotion to the Pro League
4	Al-Jabalain	38	22	10	6	53	27	+26	76	
5	Hajer	38	15	10	13	49	37	+12	55	
6	Ohod	38	13	15	10	51	52	−1	54	
7	Al-Kawkab	38	13	13	12	47	48	−1	52 (Note: Al-Kawkab finished ahead of Al-Khaleej on overall goal difference: Al-Kawkab −1, Al-Khaleej −5 (Al-Kawkab 2–2 Al-Khaleej, Al-Khaleej 0–0 Al-Kawkab).)	
8	Al-Khaleej	38	13	13	12	42	47	−5	52	
9	Al-Shoulla	38	13	12	13	37	33	+4	51	
10	Al-Diriyah	38	13	9	16	34	39	−5	48 (Note: Al-Diriyah finished ahead of Jeddah on overall goal difference: Al-Diriyah −5, Jeddah −6 (Jeddah 1–2 Al-Diriyah, Al-Diriyah 0–1 Jeddah).)	
11	Jeddah	38	13	9	16	48	54	−6	48	
12	Al-Adalah	38	10	16	12	44	39	+5	46 (Note: Al-Adalah finished ahead of Al-Sahel on head-to-head points: Al-Adalah 3–0 Al-Sahel, Al-Sahel 1–2 Al-Adalah.)	
13	Al-Sahel	38	11	13	14	34	48	−14	46	
14	Al-Jeel	38	11	11	16	37	52	−15	44	
15	Najran	38	10	13	15	43	47	−4	43	
16	Al-Nahda	38	9	15	14	37	45	−8	42	
17	Al-Bukayriyah (R)	38	11	7	20	29	48	−19	40	Relegation to the Second Division
18	Al-Thoqbah (R)	38	10	7	21	45	60	−15	37	Relegation to the Second Division
19	Arar (R)	38	4	14	20	28	62	−34	26	Relegation to the Second Division
20	Al-Nojoom (R)	38	6	5	27	27	67	−40	23	Relegation to the Second Division

Source: goalzz.com
Rules for classification: 1) Points; 2) Head-to-head points; 3) Head-to-head goal difference; 4) Total goal difference; 5) Total goals scored; 6) Fair-play points (Note: Head-to-head record is used only after all the matches between the teams in question have been played).
(C) Champions; (P) Promoted; (R) Relegated

==== Results summary ====
Overall								Home						Away					
Pld	W	D	L	GF	GA	GD	Pts	W	D	L	GF	GA	GD	W	D	L	GF	GA	GD
38	24	9	5	72	27	+45	81	15	3	1	38	11	+27	9	6	4	34	16	+18

Last updated: 31 May 2021.

==== Results by round ====
Round	1	2	3	4	5	6	7	8	9	10	11	12	13	14	15	16	17	18	19	20	21	22	23	24	25	26	27	28	29	30	31	32	33	34	35	36	37	38
Ground	H	A	H	A	H	H	A	A	H	A	A	H	A	H	A	H	A	H	A	A	H	A	H	A	A	H	H	A	H	H	A	H	A	H	A	H	A	H
Result	W	L	W	W	W	W	D	W	W	D	W	D	D	W	W	L	L	W	L	D	W	W	W	W	D	W	W	D	W	W	W	W	W	W	W	D	L	D
Position	1	9	4	4	4	2	3	2	2	2	2	2	2	2	2	2	2	2	3	2	2	2	2	2	2	2	2	2	2	2	2	2	2	2	2	2	2	2

Updated to match(es) played on 31 May 2021. Source:
A = Away; H = Home; W = Win; D = Draw; L = Loss

==== Matches ====
All times are local, AST (UTC+3).

Win Draw Loss Postponed

21 October 2020 1	Al-Fayha	3–1	Al-Nojoom	Al Majma'ah
18:05	William 35'; Bamsaud 45+2'; Al-Nakhli 90+2'	Report	Al-Jowayed 43' (pen.)	Stadium: Al Majma'ah Sports City; Referee: Bandar Al-Qahtani

27 October 2020 2	Al-Kawkab	2–1	Al-Fayha	Al-Kharj
17:50	Rguiî 25'; Aboudou 86'	Report	William 57'	Stadium: Al-Shoulla Club Stadium; Referee: Abdullah Zarban

3 November 2020 3	Al-Fayha	1–0	Al-Jeel	Al Majma'ah
15:15	Majrashi 68'	Report		Stadium: Al Majma'ah Sports City; Referee: Abdulsamad Bakri

8 November 2020 4	Al-Thoqbah	0–1	Al-Fayha	Khobar
17:30		Report	Al-Juhaim 5'	Stadium: Prince Saud bin Jalawi Stadium; Referee: Mishaal Al-Shehri

18 November 2020 5	Al-Fayha	3–1	Al-Shoulla	Al Zulfi
15:10	Al-Johani 5', 15'; Majrashi 27'	Report	Faleh 64'	Stadium: Al-Zulfi Club Stadium; Referee: Sultan Al-Okairi

24 November 2020 6	Al-Fayha	2–0	Al-Jabalain	Al Majma'ah
15:10	Al-Harbi 70'; Majrashi 82'	Report		Stadium: Al Majma'ah Sports City; Referee: Mohammed Al-Nuhait

30 November 2020 7	Al-Adalah	0–0	Al-Fayha	Al-Hasa
17:25		Report		Stadium: Al-Fateh Club Stadium; Referee: Khaled Al-Johani

5 December 2020 8	Ohod	1–5	Al-Fayha	Medina
15:35	Diomandé 65'	Report	Fouzai 47' (pen.); Al-Johani 52'; William 60'; Al-Harbi 62'; Al-Juhaim 85'	Stadium: Prince Mohammed bin Abdul Aziz Stadium; Referee: Abdullah Al-Kharboush

9 December 2020 9	Al-Fayha	1–0	Najran	Al Majma'ah
15:10	Gabriel 76'	Report		Stadium: Al Majma'ah Sports City; Referee: Mohammed Al-Buraidy

15 December 2020 10	Jeddah	1–1	Al-Fayha	Jeddah
18:20	Gharwi 78'	Report	Majrashi 71'	Stadium: King Abdullah Sports City Reserve Stadium; Referee: Mohammed Al-Smail

23 December 2020 11	Arar	1–4	Al-Fayha	Arar
15:20	Miladi 88'	Report	Majrashi 44'; Gabriel 55'; Al-Juhaim 70'; Al-Nakhli 80'	Stadium: Prince Abdullah bin Abdulaziz Sport City Stadium; Referee: Mishaal Al-Shehri

28 December 2020 12	Al-Fayha	1–1	Al-Khaleej	Al Majma'ah
15:20	Al-Juhaim 18'	Report	Rogerinho 90+4'	Stadium: Al Majma'ah Sports City; Referee: Mohammed Al-Daqqash

1 January 2021 13	Al-Diriyah	2–2	Al-Fayha	Riyadh
19:15	Al-Mohammed 66'; Al-Habashi 89'	Report	Ouattara 35'; Al-Dossari 53'	Stadium: Prince Turki bin Abdul Aziz Stadium; Referee: Abdulsamad Bakri

5 January 2021 14	Al-Fayha	2–1	Al-Bukayriyah	Al Majma'ah
15:25	Al-Juhaim 69'; El Agamy 86' (pen.)	Report	Soro 58'	Stadium: Al Majma'ah Sports City; Referee: Abdullah Al-Awidan

12 January 2021 15	Hajer	0–1	Al-Fayha	Al-Hasa
15:10		Report	Al-Harbi 89' (pen.)	Stadium: Hajer Club Stadium; Referee: Mamdouh Al Shahdan

20 January 2021 16	Al-Fayha	1–2	Al-Nahda	Al Majma'ah
15:30	Ouattara 1'	Report	Abbès 40' (pen.); Jaziri 72'	Stadium: Al Majma'ah Sports City; Referee: Maitham Al-Dalim

25 January 2021 17	Al-Tai	1–0	Al-Fayha	Ha'il
15:50	Al-Johani 40'	Report		Stadium: Prince Abdul Aziz bin Musa'ed Stadium; Referee: Hussain Abo Shaheen

29 January 2021 18	Al-Fayha	4–0	Al-Sahel	Al Majma'ah
15:40	Al-Dossari 24', 32', 66'; Ouattara 75'	Report		Stadium: Al Majma'ah Sports City; Referee: Sayyodjon Zayniddinov (Tajikistan)

2 February 2021 19	Al-Hazem	1–0	Al-Fayha	Ar Rass
15:50	Barry 61'	Report		Stadium: Al-Hazem Club Stadium; Referee: Abdulrahman Al-Sultan

11 February 2021 20	Al-Nojoom	1–1	Al-Fayha	Al-Hasa
15:30	Al-Muhaifidh 25'	Report	Al-Dossari 58'	Stadium: Prince Abdullah bin Jalawi Stadium; Referee: Mohammed Al Mare'e

17 February 2021 21	Al-Fayha	1–0	Al-Kawkab	Al Majma'ah
15:50	Owusu 67'	Report		Stadium: Al Majma'ah Sports City; Referee: Hassan Al-Habib

22 February 2021 22	Al-Jeel	0–4	Al-Fayha	Al-Hasa
15:40		Report	Al-Tofail 53' (pen.); Adeniji 69' (pen.); Al-Nakhli 75'; Ouattara 88'	Stadium: Prince Abdullah bin Jalawi Stadium; Referee: Fareeh Al-Jaloud

26 February 2021 23	Al-Fayha	3–2	Al-Thoqbah	Al Majma'ah
15:55	Al-Breh 14' (o.g.); Owusu 21'; Al-Nakhli 90'	Report	Boussaid 38'; Omrani 90+3'	Stadium: Al Majma'ah Sports City; Referee: Abdulsamad Bakri

3 March 2021 24	Al-Shoulla	1–2	Al-Fayha	Al-Kharj
15:50	Lúcio 63' (pen.)	Report	Adeniji 37', 49'	Stadium: Al-Shoulla Club Stadium; Referee: Haidar Al-Sharid

10 March 2021 25	Al-Jabalain	1–1	Al-Fayha	Ha'il
16:15	Hadhereti 21'	Report	Al-Juhaim 68'	Stadium: Prince Abdul Aziz bin Musa'ed Stadium; Referee: Sayyodjon Zayniddinov (Tajikistan)

17 March 2021 26	Al-Fayha	1–0	Al-Adalah	Al Majma'ah
16:00	Majrashi 55'	Report		Stadium: Al Majma'ah Sports City; Referee: Ahmed Al-Rumaikhany

21 March 2021 27	Al-Fayha	5–2	Ohod	Al Majma'ah
16:05	Adeniji 10', 12', 53'; Owusu 60'; Majrashi 69'	Report	Diomandé 56', 83' (pen.)	Stadium: Al Majma'ah Sports City; Referee: Nasrullo Kabirov (Tajikistan)

27 March 2021 28	Najran	2–2	Al-Fayha	Najran
16:00	Al-Ghamdi 56', 69'	Report	Al-Dossari 72'; Al-Juhaim 78'	Stadium: Prince Hathloul Bin Abdul Aziz Sports City; Referee: Majed Al-Shamrani

1 April 2021 29	Al-Fayha	2–1	Jeddah	Al Majma'ah
16:05	Owusu 3'; Adeniji 31'	Report	Ouattara 73' (o.g.)	Stadium: Al Majma'ah Sports City; Referee: Sami Al-Jires

6 April 2021 30	Al-Fayha	4–0	Arar	Al Majma'ah
18:55	Adeniji 38', 72'; Al-Khaibari 42'; Owusu 62'	Report		Stadium: Al Majma'ah Sports City; Referee: Abdullah Al-Kharboush

13 April 2021 31	Al-Khaleej	0–5	Al-Fayha	Saihat
21:30		Report	Owusu 47'; Al-Juhaim 54' (pen.); Al-Johani 56'; Majrashi 82'; Al-Harbi 90+2'	Stadium: Al-Khaleej Club Stadium; Referee: Sultan Al-Harbi

19 April 2021 32	Al-Fayha	2–0	Al-Diriyah	Al Majma'ah
21:55	Adeniji 62'; Al-Harbi 90+3' (pen.)	Report		Stadium: Al Majma'ah Sports City; Referee: Fareeh Al-Jaloud

24 April 2021 33	Al-Bukayriyah	0–1	Al-Fayha	Al Bukayriyah
22:00		Report	Al-Juhaim 69'	Stadium: Al-Bukayriyah Club Stadium; Referee: Mohammed Al-Hoaish

29 April 2021 34	Al-Fayha	2–0	Hajer	Al Majma'ah
22:00	Adeniji 12'; Owusu 78'	Report		Stadium: Al Majma'ah Sports City; Referee: Ahmed Al-Rumaikhany

15 May 2021 35	Al-Nahda	0–2	Al-Fayha	Dammam
22:00		Report	Al-Johani 11'; Ouattara 55'	Stadium: Prince Mohamed bin Fahd Stadium; Referee: Khaled Al-Teris

20 May 2021 36	Al-Fayha	0–0	Al-Tai	Al Majma'ah
19:15		Report		Stadium: Al Majma'ah Sports City; Referee: Sultan Al-Harbi

25 May 2021 37	Al-Sahel	2–1	Al-Fayha	Khobar
19:00	Al-Juraibi 12'; Al-Dhefiery 16'	Report	Owusu 84'	Stadium: Prince Saud bin Jalawi Stadium; Referee: Maitham Al-Dalim

31 May 2021 38	Al-Fayha	0–0	Al-Hazem	Al Majma'ah
21:00		Report		Stadium: Al Majma'ah Sports City; Referee: Abdullah Al-Kharboush

== Statistics ==
=== Appearances ===
Last updated on 31 May 2021.

No.	Pos	Nat	Player	Total		MS League	
No.	Pos	Nat	Player	Apps	Goals	Apps	Goals
Goalkeepers
1	GK	(Saudi Arabia) KSA	Moslem Al Freej	36	0	36	0
27	GK	(Saudi Arabia) KSA	Khaled Al Muqaitib	0	0	0	0
33	GK	(Saudi Arabia) KSA	Mansour Jawhar	3	0	2+1	0
Defenders
2	DF	(Saudi Arabia) KSA	Mukhair Al-Rashidi	18	0	11+7	0
3	DF	(Saudi Arabia) KSA	Bander Nasser	22	0	22	0
4	DF	(Saudi Arabia) KSA	Sami Al-Khaibari	27	1	27	1
5	DF	(Ivory Coast) CIV	Soualio Ouattara	35	5	35	5
6	DF	(Saudi Arabia) KSA	Abdullah Al-Dawsari	5	0	3+2	0
12	DF	(Saudi Arabia) KSA	Bander Al-Mutairi	2	0	0+2	0
17	DF	(Saudi Arabia) KSA	Ziyad Al-Jarrad	7	0	6+1	0
22	DF	(Saudi Arabia) KSA	Mohammed Al-Baqawi	35	0	33+2	0
24	DF	(Saudi Arabia) KSA	Ahmed Bamsaud	22	1	14+8	1
64	DF	(Saudi Arabia) KSA	Sultan Al-Harbi	0	0	0	0
67	DF	(Mali) MLI	Anas Traoré	1	0	1	0
Midfielders
7	MF	(Saudi Arabia) KSA	Abdullah Al-Dossari	32	6	12+20	6
8	MF	(Saudi Arabia) KSA	Faisal Al-Johani	34	5	33+1	5
15	MF	(Saudi Arabia) KSA	Ibrahim Al-Harbi	32	5	9+23	5
18	MF	(Saudi Arabia) KSA	Hassan Jaafari	6	0	3+3	0
19	MF	(Ghana) GHA	Samuel Owusu	22	8	20+2	8
20	MF	(Saudi Arabia) KSA	Hussain Al-Sheikh	14	0	9+5	0
26	MF	(Saudi Arabia) KSA	Munther Al-Nakhli	19	4	6+13	4
42	MF	(Nigeria) NGR	Reuben Gabriel	35	2	35	2
50	MF	(Saudi Arabia) KSA	Talal Majrashi	33	8	29+4	8
66	MF	(Saudi Arabia) KSA	Ahmed Al-Suhail	33	0	16+17	0
77	MF	(Saudi Arabia) KSA	Abdullah Al-Tofail	17	1	7+10	1
96	MF	(Saudi Arabia) KSA	Abdulaziz Al-Dhuwayhi	8	0	0+8	0
Forwards
9	FW	(Saudi Arabia) KSA	Hamad Al-Juhaim	30	9	9+21	9
25	FW	(Nigeria) NGR	Tunde Adeniji	17	11	15+2	11
30	FW	(Saudi Arabia) KSA	Saqer Otaif	2	0	1+1	0
99	FW	(Saudi Arabia) KSA	Safi Al-Zaqarti	4	0	1+3	0
Player who made an appearance this season but have left the club
10	MF	(Tunisia) TUN	Youssef Fouzai	12	1	11+1	1
11	MF	(Egypt) EGY	Tarek El Agamy	7	1	1+6	1
70	FW	(Brazil) BRA	William Alves	15	3	11+4	3

=== Goalscorers ===
Rank	No.	Pos	Nat	Name	MS League	Total
1	25	FW	(Nigeria)	Tunde Adeniji	11	11
2	9	FW	(Saudi Arabia)	Hamad Al-Juhaim	9	9
3	19	MF	(Ghana)	Samuel Owusu	8	8
3	50	MF	(Saudi Arabia)	Talal Majrashi	8	8
5	7	MF	(Saudi Arabia)	Abdullah Al-Dossari	6	6
6	5	DF	(Ivory Coast)	Soualio Ouattara	5	5
6	8	MF	(Saudi Arabia)	Faisal Al-Johani	5	5
6	15	MF	(Saudi Arabia)	Ibrahim Al-Harbi	5	5
9	26	MF	(Saudi Arabia)	Munther Al-Nakhli	4	4
10	70	FW	(Brazil)	William Alves	3	3
11	42	MF	(Nigeria)	Reuben Gabriel	2	2
12	4	DF	(Saudi Arabia)	Sami Al-Khaibari	1	1
12	10	MF	(Tunisia)	Youssef Fouzai	1	1
12	11	MF	(Egypt)	Tarek El Agamy	1	1
12	24	DF	(Saudi Arabia)	Ahmed Bamsaud	1	1
12	77	MF	(Saudi Arabia)	Abdullah Al-Tofail	1	1
Own goal					1	1
Total					72	72

Last Updated: 25 May 2021

=== Clean sheets ===
Rank	No.	Pos	Nat	Name	MS League	Total
1	1	GK	(Saudi Arabia)	Moslem Al Freej	18	18
Total					18	18

Last Updated: 31 May 2021
