= Abdullah Al-Dossari =

Abdullah Al-Dossari may refer to:

- Abdullah Al-Dossari (born 1983), Saudi Arabian footballer
- Abdullah Al-Dossari (born 1990), Saudi Arabian footballer
- Abdullah Al-Dossari (born 1993), Saudi Arabian footballer
