= Samuel Owusu =

Ghanaian footballer

Personal information
- Full name: Samuel Kwame Owusu
- Date of birth: 28 March 1996 (age 30)
- Place of birth: Accra, Ghana
- Height: 1.67 m (5 ft 6 in)
- Position: Winger

Team information
- Current team: Maccabi Petah Tikva
- Number: 9

Youth career
- Red Bull Ghana
- Vision

Senior career*
Years	Team	Apps	(Gls)
2014–2016	Radnik Surdulica	41	(7)
2016–2017	Gençlerbirliği	3	(1)
2017–2019	Čukarički	64	(11)
2019–2022	Al-Fayha	71	(15)
2020–2021	→ Al-Ahli (loan)	10	(3)
2022–2023	Čukarički	32	(1)
2023–2024	Neom	24	(5)
2024–2025	OFK Beograd	23	(3)
2025–	Maccabi Petah Tikva	35	(4)

International career^{‡}
2019–2022	Ghana	17	(1)
- * Club domestic league appearances and goals as of 24 June 2026 ‡ National team caps and goals as of 15 July 2022

Samuel Kwame Owusu (born 28 March 1996) is a Ghanaian professional footballer who plays as a right winger for Israeli club Maccabi Petah Tikva. He has also represented the Ghana national team.

== Club career ==
=== Radnik Surdulica ===
Born in Accra, Owusu played for Red Bull Ghana and Vision in his homeland, before moving abroad to Serbia and joining Radnik Surdulica in August 2014. He made 12 appearances in the 2014–15 Serbian First League, helping the club win the title and promotion to the top flight. In the 2015–16 Serbian SuperLiga, Owusu started playing more regularly, scoring seven times in 30 games. He signed a one-year extension with the club in May 2016.

=== Gençlerbirliği ===
In June 2016, Owusu was transferred to Turkish club Gençlerbirliği on a two-year deal with an option for another year. The transfer fee was reportedly €200,000. He made three appearances in the 2016–17 Turkish Cup, scoring one goal in a 6–0 home victory over Amed, but failed to appear in any league games during the season.

=== Čukarički ===
In August 2017, Owusu returned to Serbia and joined Čukarički, penning a three-year contract and receiving the number 19 shirt. He scored four times in 30 games during the 2017–18 Serbian SuperLiga. In the following 2018–19 season, Owusu scored seven goals and helped the club earn a spot in UEFA competitions after three years.

=== Al-Fayha ===
On 18 August 2019, Al-Fayha has signed Owusu for one seasons from Čukarički.

=== Al-Ahli ===
On 25 October 2020, Al-Ahli have signed Owusu on loan for three months from Al-Fayha.

=== Neom ===
On 21 September 2023, Owusu joined Saudi Second Division side Al-Suqoor, than changed name to Neom in January 2024.

== International career ==
In late May 2019, Owusu was named in Ghana's 29-man provisional squad for the 2019 Africa Cup of Nations. He subsequently debuted for the Black Stars in early June, coming on as a substitute in a 1–0 friendly loss to Namibia. Despite his team's defeat, Owusu made a strong impression, and got included in James Kwesi Appiah's final 23-man AFCON selection. He was part of the Ghanaian team for the 2021 African Cup of Nations in Cameroon.

== Career statistics ==
=== Club ===
As of match played 18 June 2026

Appearances and goals by club, season and competition
Club	Season	League			National cup (Note: Includes Serbian Cup, Turkish Cup, King Cup)		Continental		Total	
Club	Season	Division	Apps	Goals	Apps	Goals	Apps	Goals	Apps	Goals
Radnik Surdulica	2014–15	Serbian First League	12	0	1	0	—		13	0
Radnik Surdulica	2015–16	Serbian SuperLiga	30	7	1	0	—		31	7
Radnik Surdulica	Total		42	7	2	0	—		44	7
Gençlerbirliği	2016–17	Süper Lig	0	0	3	1	—		3	1
Čukarički	2017–18	Serbian SuperLiga	30	4	4	0	—		34	4
Čukarički	2018–19	Serbian SuperLiga	32	7	1	0	—		33	7
Čukarički	2019–20	Serbian SuperLiga	2	0	0	0	2 (Note: Appearances in UEFA Europa League)	0	2	0
Čukarički	Total		64	11	5	0	2	0	71	11
Al-Fayha	2019–20	Saudi Pro League	28	7	1	0	—		29	7
Al-Fayha	2020–21	Saudi First Division League	22	8	—		—		22	8
Al-Fayha	2021–22	Saudi Pro League	21	0	1	0	—		22	0
Al-Fayha	Total		71	15	2	0	—		73	15
Al-Ahli (loan)	2020–21	Saudi Pro League	10	3	2	0	—		12	3
Čukarički	2022–23	Serbian SuperLiga	29	1	3	0	3 (Note: Appearances in UEFA Europa Conference League)	0	35	1
Čukarički	2023–24	Serbian SuperLiga	3	0	0	0	1	0	4	0
Čukarički	Total		32	1	3	0	4	0	39	1
Neom	2023–24	Saudi Second Division League	24	5	—		—		24	5
OFK Beograd	2024–25	Serbian SuperLiga	23	3	0	0	—		23	3
Maccabi Petah Tikva	2025–26	Liga Leumit	35	4	1	0	—		36	4
Career total			301	49	18	1	6	0	325	50

=== International ===
As of 15 July 2022

Ghana
Year	Apps	Goals
2019	8	0
2020	3	1
2021	4	0
2022	2	0
Total	17	1

Scores and results list Ghana's goal tally first, score column indicates score after each Owusu goal.

List of international goals scored by Samuel Owusu
No.	Date	Venue	Opponent	Score	Result	Competition
1	12 October 2020	Mardan Sports Complex, Aksu, Turkey	Qatar	4–1	5–1	Friendly

== Honours ==
Radnik Surdulica

- Serbian First League: 2014–15

Al-Fayha

- King Cup: 2021–22

Neom

- Saudi Second Division League: 2023–24
