= Mukhair Al-Rashidi =

Saudi Arabian footballer

Mukhair Al-Rashidi مخير الرشيدي
Personal information
- Full name: Mukhair Saleh M. Al-Rashidi
- Date of birth: May 20, 1999 (age 27)
- Place of birth: Farasan Island, Saudi Arabia
- Height: 1.70 m (5 ft 7 in)
- Position: Right back

Team information
- Current team: Al-Fayha
- Number: 2

Youth career
- –2017: Al-Sawari
- 2017–2018: Al-Fayha

Senior career*
Years	Team	Apps	(Gls)
2018–	Al-Fayha	129	(2)

International career
2017–2019	Saudi Arabia U20	7	(0)
2022	Saudi Arabia U23		
- * Club domestic league appearances and goals as of 20:51, 4 May 2026 (UTC)

Mukhair Al-Rashidi (Arabic: مخير الرشيدي; born 20 May 1999) is a Saudi Arabian professional footballer who plays as a right back for Pro League club Al-Fayha.

== Career ==
Al-Rashidi started his career in the youth teams of Al-Sawari. On 28 July 2017, Al-Rashidi joined Al-Fayha. He made his first-team debut on 6 January 2018, by starting the King Cup Round of 32 match against Al-Qaisumah. He made his league debut by coming off the bench against Al-Nassr on 11 January 2018. On 12 July 2019, Al-Rashidi signed his first professional contract with Al-Fayha. He signed a 3-year contract with the option to extend for a further 2 years. Al-Rashidi scored his first goal for the club on 14 December 2019, in a 2–1 loss against Damac. On 24 January 2022, Al-Rashidi renewed his contract with Al-Fayha.

== Career statistics ==
=== Club ===
As of match played 31 May 2024

Club	Season	League			King Cup		Continental		Other		Total	
Club	Season	Division	Apps	Goals	Apps	Goals	Apps	Goals	Apps	Goals	Apps	Goals
Al-Fayha	2017–18	SPL	1	0	1	0	—		0	0	2	0
Al-Fayha	2018–19	SPL	0	0	0	0	—		—		0	0
Al-Fayha	2019–20	SPL	13	1	1	0	—		—		14	1
Al-Fayha	2020–21	MSL	18	0	—		—		—		18	0
Al-Fayha	2021–22	SPL	21	0	3	0	—		—		24	0
Al-Fayha	2022–23	SPL	8	0	1	0	—		0	0	9	0
Al-Fayha	2023–24	SPL	28	0	2	0	6	0	—		36	0
Al-Fayha	Total		89	1	8	0	6	0	0	0	103	1
Career total			89	1	8	0	6	0	0	0	103	1

== Honours ==
=== Club ===
Al-Fayha

- King Cup: 2021–22

=== International ===
Saudi Arabia U20

- AFC U-19 Championship: 2018
