= Ibrahim Al-Harbi =

Ibrahim Al-Harbi may refer to:

- Ibrahim Mater (born 1975), Saudi Arabian footballer
- Ibrahim Al-Harbi (footballer, born 1995), Saudi Arabian footballer
