= Abdulrahman Al-Safri =

Saudi Arabian footballer

Abdulrahman Al-Safri عبدالرحمن السفري
Personal information
- Full name: Abdulrahman Salem Al-Safri
- Date of birth: 31 March 1993 (age 33)
- Place of birth: Saudi Arabia
- Height: 1.77 m (5 ft 9 1/2 in)
- Position: Midfielder

Team information
- Current team: Al Faisaly
- Number: 18

Youth career
- –2013: Al-Ahli

Senior career*
Years	Team	Apps	(Gls)
2013–2014	Louletano	3	(0)
2014–2015	Al-Ittihad	0	(0)
2015–2018	Al-Watani		
2018–2019	Jeddah	17	(0)
2019–2020	Damac	9	(0)
2020–2021	Al-Qadsiah	29	(0)
2021–2024	Al-Fayha	74	(1)
2024–2026	Al-Kholood	46	(1)
2026–	Al Faisaly	3	(1)
- * Club domestic league appearances and goals as of 31 October 2026

Abdulrahman Al-Safri (Arabic: عبدالرحمن السفري, born 31 March 1993) is a Saudi Arabian professional footballer who plays as a midfielder for a Saudi team Al Faisaly.

== Career ==
Al-Safri is a graduate of Al-Ahli's academy. Al-Safri joined Portuguese club Louletano, where he spent one season and made 3 appearances. Al-Safri then returned to Saudi Arabia and signed for Al-Ittihad. He once again spent a season at a club before moving on, this time joining Al-Watani. After 3 seasons at the club, Al-Safri left Al-Watani following their relegation to the Saudi Second Division and joined Jeddah. Al-Safri spent a season with Jeddah before joining newly promoted Pro League side Damac. On 31 January 2020, Al-Safri was released by Damac. He made 9 league appearances for the club. Later on the same day, Al-Safri joined MS League side Al-Qadsiah. On 30 June 2021, Al-Safri joined Al-Fayha on a three-year contract. On 23 July 2024, Al-Safri joined Al-Kholood on a free transfer.

== Honours ==
Al-Qadsiah

- First Division League runners-up: 2019–20

Al-Fayha

- King Cup: 2021–22
