= Munther Al-Nakhli =

Saudi Arabian footballer

Personal information
- Full name: Munther Dakheel Al-Nakhli
- Date of birth: 13 February 1998 (age 28)
- Place of birth: Medina, Saudi Arabia
- Height: 1.67 m (5 ft 5 1/2 in)
- Position: Winger

Team information
- Current team: Al-Wehda (on loan from Al-Bukiryah)
- Number: 26

Youth career
- –2015: Al-Nomoor Academy
- 2015–2017: Al-Fateh

Senior career*
| Years | Team | Apps | (Gls) |
| 2017–2022 | Al-Fateh | 12 | (0) |
| 2020–2021 | → Al-Fayha (loan) | 19 | (4) |
| 2022–2023 | Al-Arabi | 23 | (0) |
| 2023–2024 | Jeddah | 21 | (2) |
| 2024– | Al-Bukiryah | 35 | (1) |
| 2026– | → Al-Wehda (loan) | 0 | (0) |

International career
| 2016 | Saudi Arabia U20 | | |
- * Club domestic league appearances and goals as of 29 February 2020

Munther Al-Nakhli (Arabic: منذر النخلي; born 13 February 1998) is a Saudi Arabian footballer who plays as a winger for Al-Wehda, on loan from Al-Bukiryah.

== Career ==
Al-Nakhli started his career at Al-Nomoor Academy in Medina. On 28 May 2014, Al-Nakhli won the Prince of Football Tournament in Saudi Arabia which allegedly granted him a scholarship to Liverpool. However, this was proven to be false and nothing was materialized. He joined Al-Fateh's academy in 2015.

On 23 December 2017, Al-Nakhli made his professional debut for Al-Fateh against Al-Ahli in the Pro League, replacing Ali Al-Zaqaan.

On 22 August 2019, Al-Nakhli signed his first professional contract with Al-Fateh keeping him at the club until 2022.

On 7 October 2020, Al-Nakhli joined Al-Fayha on a one-year loan.

On 15 July 2022, Al-Nakhli joined First Division League side Al-Arabi on a free transfer. In August 2023, Al-Nakhli joined Jeddah. On 14 August 2024, Al-Nakhli joined Al-Bukiryah. On 3 February 2026, Al-Nakhli joined Al-Wehda on a sex-month loan.

== Career statistics ==
=== Club ===
As of 29 May 2024

| Club | Season | League | | King Cup | | Asia | | Other | | Total | |
| Club | Season | Apps | Goals | Apps | Goals | Apps | Goals | Apps | Goals | Apps | Goals |
|---|---|---|---|---|---|---|---|---|---|---|---|
| Al-Fateh | 2017–18 | 1 | 0 | 1 | 0 | — | | 0 | 0 | 2 | 0 |
| Al-Fateh | 2018–19 | 2 | 0 | 1 | 0 | — | | — | | 3 | 0 |
| Al-Fateh | 2019–20 | 6 | 0 | 1 | 0 | — | | — | | 7 | 0 |
| Al-Fateh | 2021–22 | 3 | 0 | 0 | 0 | — | | — | | 3 | 0 |
| Al-Fateh | Total | 12 | 0 | 3 | 0 | 0 | 0 | 0 | 0 | 15 | 0 |
| Al-Fayha (loan) | 2020–21 | 19 | 4 | — | | — | | — | | 19 | 4 |
| Al-Arabi | 2022–23 | 23 | 0 | — | | — | | — | | 23 | 0 |
| Jeddah | 2023–24 | 21 | 2 | 0 | 0 | — | | — | | 21 | 2 |
| Career totals | | 75 | 6 | 3 | 0 | 0 | 0 | 0 | 0 | 78 | 6 |
