= Panagiotis Tachtsidis =

Greek footballer (born 1991)

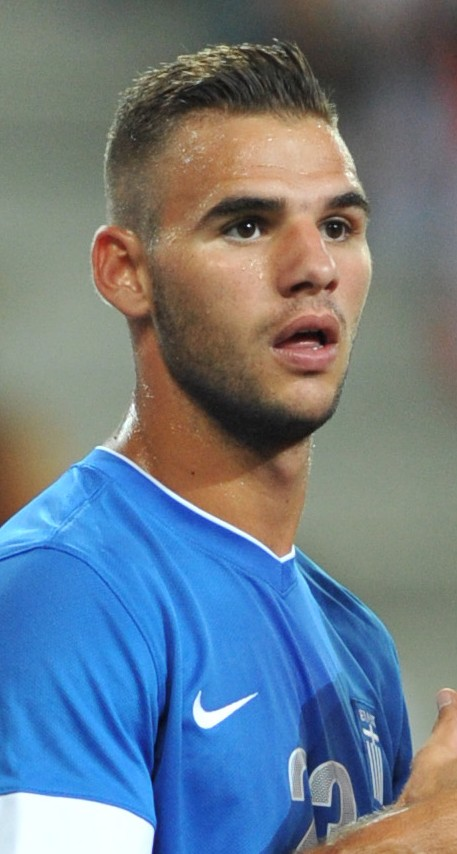
- Tachtsidis in 2013

Personal information
- Date of birth: 15 February 1991 (age 35)
- Place of birth: Nafplio, Greece
- Height: 1.93 m (6 ft 4 in)
- Position: Midfielder

Team information
- Current team: Karmiotissa
- Number: 77

Youth career
- 2005–2007: AEK Athens

Senior career*
Years	Team	Apps	(Gls)
2007–2010	AEK Athens	20	(2)
2010–2012	Genoa	0	(0)
2010	→ Cesena (loan)	0	(0)
2011	→ Grosseto (loan)	8	(0)
2011–2012	→ Hellas Verona (loan)	37	(2)
2012–2013	Roma	21	(1)
2013–2014	Catania	12	(0)
2014	→ Torino (loan)	11	(1)
2014–2016	Genoa	24	(2)
2014–2015	→ Hellas Verona (loan)	34	(3)
2016–2017	Torino	0	(0)
2016–2017	→ Cagliari (loan)	26	(0)
2017–2018	Olympiacos	18	(0)
2018–2019	Nottingham Forest	0	(0)
2019	→ Lecce (loan)	17	(0)
2019–2021	Lecce	54	(1)
2021–2022	Al-Fayha	29	(1)
2022–2023	Khor Fakkan	9	(0)
2023–2025	CFR Cluj	49	(9)
2025–2026	Remo	9	(1)
2026–	Karmiotissa	4	(0)

International career
2007–2008	Greece U17	3	(1)
2008–2009	Greece U19	8	(2)
2009–2012	Greece U21	10	(0)
2012–2018	Greece	25	(1)
- * Club domestic league appearances and goals as of 20 September 2026

Panagiotis Tachtsidis (Greek: Παναγιώτης Ταχτσίδης; Greek pronunciation: [pana'jotis tak't͡si:dis]; born 15 February 1991) is a Greek professional footballer who plays as a midfielder for Cypriot First Division club Karmiotissa FC.

== Club career ==
=== AEK Athens ===
Tachtsidis was scouted by Toni Savevski, the head of AEK Athens's youth academy at the time, and signed his first professional contract with AEK on 1 November 2007. Shortly after signing his first professional contract, Tachtsidis made his debut for AEK in the Greek Cup against Fostiras. On 27 January 2009, he became the youngest player to have ever played for AEK in the Greek League when he played against Thrasyvoulos, being 16 years and 348 days old; that record, however, has since been surpassed by Taxiarchis Fountas, also for AEK. Against Thrasyvoulos, Tachtsidis scored the winning goal in the 92nd minute to give his team the three points.

=== Genoa ===
On 21 April 2010, Tachtsidis completed a move to Italian club Genoa that had already been previously agreed upon in January 2010.

==== Loans to Cesena, Grosseto and Verona ====
In August 2010, he was loaned to Cesena with an option to buy half of his registration rights in co-ownership. In February 2011, he was loaned to Grosseto.

In the 2011–12 season, he was loaned to Verona. With Verona, he helped the club reach the play-offs.

=== Roma ===
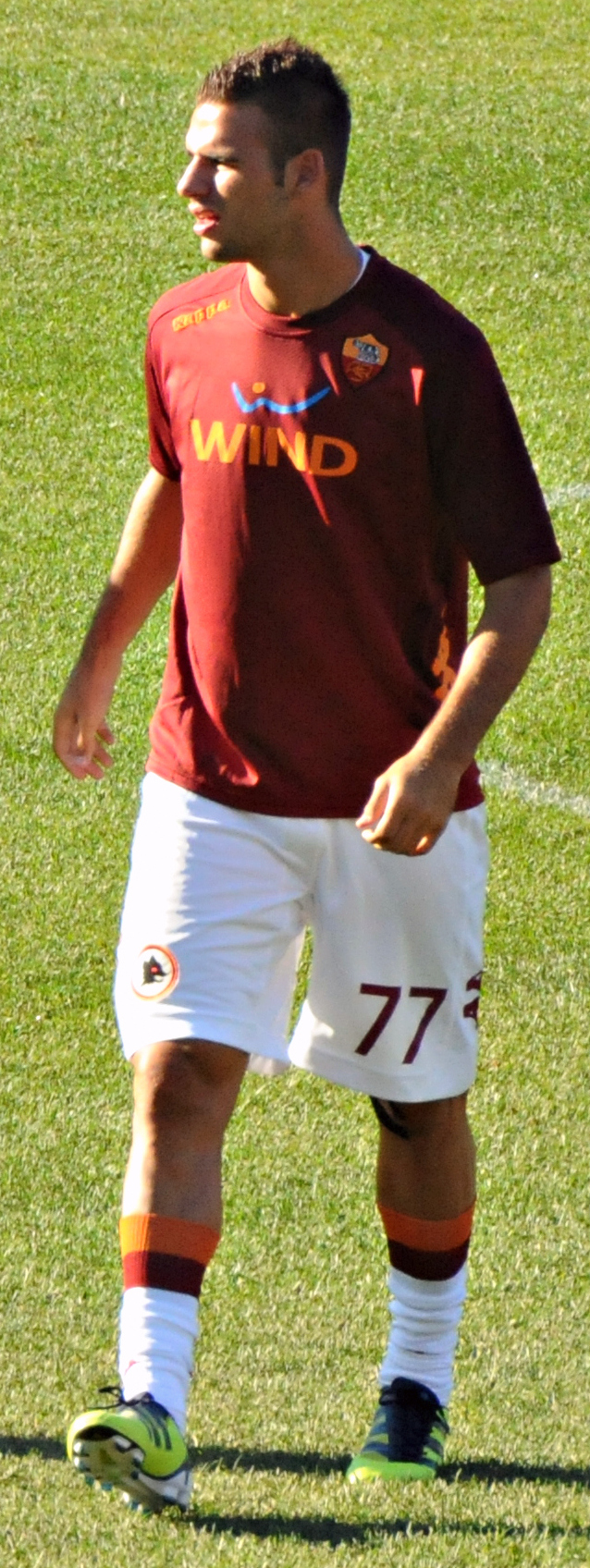
Tachtsidis playing for Roma in 2012.

On 19 July 2012, Tachtsidis signed a five-year contract with Roma for a fee of €2.5 million in co-ownership deal (€1.5 million plus 50% registration rights of Andrea Bertolacci). He scored one goal in 21 appearances for the club during the 2012–13 season.

On 20 June 2013, Roma signed Mattia Destro outright for a pre-agreed figure of €4.5 million. Giammario Piscitella and Valerio Verre, who were sent to Genoa as part of the Destro loan deal, returned to Roma for €4 million in total (having cost Genoa €3 million in 2012). As part of this complex deal, Tachtsidis returned to Genoa for €3 million.

=== Catania ===
On 20 June 2013, it was announced that Tachtsidis had returned to Genoa, however, less than a month later he was sold in a co-ownership deal to Catania in exchange for the co-ownership of Francesco Lodi. However, he left the club temporarily after 6 months and definitively in June 2014.

==== Loan to Torino ====
On 9 January 2014, he was loaned to Torino on loan for the rest of the season. He made his first appearance on 19 January, in a 2–0 away win against Sassuolo. He scored his first goal for the club in a 3–3 away draw against Lazio. On 13 June 2014, Tachtsidis and Lodi returned to Genoa and Catania respectively.

=== Genoa and loan to Verona ===
Genoa bought back Tachtsidis on 13 June 2014. On 18 July 2014, he returned to Verona on loan with a buyout option at the end of the season. However, Verona did not buy Tachtsidis; Tachtsidis returned to Genoa at the end of season, making his debut 2 months later.

He made his debut for Genoa on 23 August 2015, away to Palermo, as a 68th minute replacement for Diego Capel. He scored his first goal for the club in a 3–2 win against Chievo Verona.

=== Return to Torino and loan to Cagliari ===
On 5 August 2016, he signed a contract with Torino for a fee of reported €1.3 million. However, contradicted to the press release, Torino stated in the 2016 filing that the deal initially a loan.

Less than a month after the signing of his contract with Torino, Cagliari signed Tachtsidis in a temporary deal. On 15 November 2016, Tachtsidis was injured for at least two weeks after an injury on international duty.

=== Olympiacos ===
On 30 June 2017, he was signed by Olympiacos. On 19 September 2017, he made his debut with the club in a Greek Cup 2–1 home win game against Asteras Tripolis. On 7 February 2018, Tachtsidis grabbed a goal back from a set-piece for Oscar Garcia's Olympiacos, but the reds could not find a way back and waved goodbye to a chance of silverware with AEK Athens, progressing to the Greek Football Cup semifinals 2–1 on aggregate after the first leg ended 0–0. It was his first goal with the club.

=== Nottingham Forest ===
On 5 September 2018, Tachtsidis signed for EFL Championship side Nottingham Forest on a two-year deal. In December 2018, Tachtsidis completed a loan move to Italian club Lecce. The deal included a clause to make the move permanent the following summer. The Greek midfielder had found his opportunities hugely limited at the City Ground, following his arrival from Olympiacos. The 27-year-old has featured on the bench – but has not had any minutes on the pitch, amid fierce competition for places in Aitor Karanka's squad.

Following his loan spell at Lecce, Tachtsidis was released by Forest.

=== Lecce ===
On 3 January 2019, he moved to Serie B side Lecce on loan, with a clause included to make the move permanent in the summer. On 19 January he made his debut with the giallorossi side in a home draw against Benevento in the Serie B. On 11 May 2019, he helped his club in a 2–1 home win against Spezia Calcio and Lecce secured automatic promotion to Serie A. Lecce triggered the buying option at the end of the season.

=== Al-Fayha ===
On 16 July 2021, he moved to Saudi Professional League side Al-Fayha. On 11 August 2021, he was the only scorer, in his first appearance with the club in a home 1–0 win game against Al-Ittihad. On 19 May 2022, he scored the winning penalty (3–1) for Al-Fayha against Al Hilal in the 2022 King Cup Final.

=== Khor Fakkan ===
On 30 September 2022, Tachtsidis joined UAE Pro League side Khor Fakkan.

=== CFR Cluj ===
On 21 July 2023, Tachtsidis joined Liga I side CFR Cluj.

=== Remo ===
On 3 September 2025, Tachtsidis joined Campeonato Brasileiro Série B side Remo.

== International career ==
Tachtsidis made 25 appearances for Greece. He made his international debut in a 1–0 away victory over the Republic of Ireland on 14 November 2012.

In May 2014 Tachtsidis was called up to the Greek 30-man provisional squad for the 2014 FIFA World Cup by national manager Fernando Santos. On the 2 June 2014 Tachtsidis was named in 23-man squad for the World Cup in Brazil. Tachtsidis was an unused substitute in all four of Greece's games at the tournament.

On 30 March 2015, Tachtsidis and Vangelis Moras as well Giannis Fetfatzidis were in a car crash. The three Greek internationals were travelling by taxi to Budapest Airport in Hungary, following a Euro 2016 qualifier. One person was killed in the collision, but the Greek Federation released a statement confirming that the three players were not seriously injured. Three other people were seriously injured in the crash. On 11 October 2015, he scored his first goal with Greece in a 4–3 home win against Hungary when he lashed in a powerful shot.

== Style of play ==
Tachtsidis is a particular type of player that needs to be accommodated into a specific system. Without being particularly athletic, the Greek international more than makes up for this with an exceptional range of passing.

== Personal life ==
He was married to Zeta Theodoropoulou, with whom he has three children. They recently had a divorce.

== Career statistics ==
=== Club ===
As of 23 November 2025

Appearances and goals by club, season and competition
Club	Season	League			National cup (Note: Includes Greek Cup, Coppa Italia, King's Cup, UAE President's Cup, Cupa României)		Continental		Other		Total	
Club	Season	Division	Apps	Goals	Apps	Goals	Apps	Goals	Apps	Goals	Apps	Goals
AEK Athens	2007–08	Super League Greece	2	0	1	0	0	0	—		3	0
AEK Athens	2008–09	Super League Greece	9	1	4	0	0	0	—		13	1
AEK Athens	2009–10	Super League Greece	9	1	1	0	2 (Note: Appearances in UEFA Europa League)	0	—		12	1
AEK Athens	Total		20	2	6	0	2	0	—		28	2
Cesena (loan)	2010–11	Serie A	0	0	0	0	—		—		0	0
Grosseto (loan)	2010–11	Serie B	8	0	—		—		—		8	0
Hellas Verona (loan)	2011–12	Serie B	37	2	0	0	—		2 (Note: Appearances in Serie B promotion play-offs)	1	39	3
Roma	2012–13	Serie A	21	1	2	0	—		—		23	1
Catania	2013–14	Serie A	12	0	0	0	—		—		12	0
Torino (loan)	2013–14	Serie A	11	1	0	0	—		—		11	1
Hellas Verona (loan)	2014–15	Serie A	34	3	1	0	—		—		35	3
Genoa	2015–16	Serie A	24	2	1	0	—		—		25	2
Cagliari (loan)	2016–17	Serie A	26	0	0	0	—		—		26	0
Olympiacos	2017–18	Super League Greece	17	0	5	1	3 (Note: Appearances in UEFA Champions League)	0	—		25	1
Nottingham Forest	2018–19	EFL Championship	0	0	0	0	—		—		0	0
Lecce (loan)	2018–19	Serie B	17	0	—		—		—		17	0
Lecce	2019–20	Serie A	28	0	1	0	—		—		29	0
Lecce	2020–21	Serie B	26	1	1	0	—		1	0	28	1
Lecce	Total		71	1	2	0	—		1	0	74	1
Al-Fayha	2021–22	Saudi Professional League	28	1	4	2	—		—		32	3
Al-Fayha	2022–23	Saudi Professional League	1	0	—		—		—		1	0
Al-Fayha	Total		29	1	4	2	—		—		33	3
Khor Fakkan	2022–23	UAE Pro League	9	0	1	1	—		4 (Note: Appearances in UAE League Cup)	0	14	1
CFR Cluj	2023–24	Liga I	32	7	3	0	2 (Note: Appearances in UEFA Conference League)	0	—		37	7
CFR Cluj	2024–25	Liga I	17	2	3	0	6	0	—		26	2
CFR Cluj	Total		49	9	6	0	8	0	—		63	9
Remo	2025	Série B	9	1	—		—		—		9	1
Career total			377	23	28	4	13	0	7	1	425	28

=== International ===
As of match played 15 May 2018

Appearances and goals by national team and year
National team	Year	Apps	Goals
Greece
Greece	2012	1	0
Greece	2013	3	0
Greece	2014	5	0
Greece	2015	5	1
Greece	2016	5	0
Greece	2017	4	0
Greece	2018	2	0
Total		25	1

Scores and results list Greece's goal tally first, score column indicates score after each Tachtsidis goal.

List of international goals scored by Panagiotis Tachtsidis
No.	Date	Venue	Opponent	Score	Result	Competition
1	11 October 2015	Karaiskakis Stadium, Piraeus, Greece	Hungary	2–2	4–3	UEFA Euro 2016 qualification

== Honours ==
AEK Athens

- Greek Football Cup runner-up: 2008–09

Roma

- Coppa Italia runner-up: 2012–13

Al-Fayha

- King Cup: 2021–22

CFR Cluj

- Cupa României: 2024–25

Remo

- Super Copa Grão-Pará: 2026
