= Al-Safa Club =

Association football club in Saudi Arabia

- Full name: Al-Safa Sport Club
- Founded: 1 January 1947; 79 years ago
- Ground: Al-Safa Club Stadium, Safwa City, Saudi Arabia
- Capacity: 3,500
- Owner: Ministry of Sport
- Chairman: Mohammed Hassan Ibrahim
- Manager: Juan Brown
- League: Saudi Second Division League
- 2024–25: FDL, 17 of 18 (relegated)
- Website: www.alsafa.sa

Al-Safa Club (Arabic: نادي الصفا, lit. Purity Club) is a professional football section of the same-named multi-sport club based in Safwa City, Qatif, in the Eastern Province of Saudi Arabia. that competes in the Saudi Second Division League, the third tier of the Saudi football league system.

== History ==
Al-Safa Club was founded in 1947 under the name of "Al-Safa Football Team". And when the Ministry of Interior in Saudi Arabia organized the establishments of sports teams, a special committee visited Safwa city and officially registered the team as a sports club that is officially registered and regulated under the General Presidency of Youth Welfare (GPYF) in Saudi Arabia.

== Overview ==
The club competes in ten different sports in Saudi Arabia on the youth and adult levels. These are: Football, Track and field, Handball, Volleyball, Basketball, Squash, Tennis, Table Tennis, Swimming and Bodybuilding. The sports club members have reached highest levels in Saudi Arabia's competitions and have represented the country with the national teams in world cups/ championships and in the Olympic Games.

The club has also multicultural participations in Theatre, Photography, Arts and general training and development.

== Management ==
=== Current board members ===
The current board of directors of the club was elected in August 2023 at the general assembly meeting. The assembly elected the president and board members as follows:

President	Mohammed Hassan Ibrahim
Vice president	Kumail Ali Alibrahim
Secretary general	Khoder Ali Alabas
Football committee chairman	Jawad Mohammed Al mohaisen
Sports committee chairman	Mujahed Yassen Alyassen
Sport committee vice chairman	Mohammed Jawad Alsafwani
Legal committee chairman	Habib Zaki Alsaeed
Finance committee chairman	Ahmed Hamza Alhashim
Investment committee chairman	Deyab Saeed Fardan

=== Coaching staff ===
Position	Name
Manager	
Assistant Manager	(Saudi Arabia) Salman Al-Qahtani
Goalkeeper Coach	(Tunisia) Ben Othmen Fahmi
Fitness coach	
Match Analysis	(Saudi Arabia) Khalid Al-Azmi
Performance director	(Saudi Arabia) Abdulaziz Al-Masoudi
Team doctor	(Saudi Arabia) Bandar Al-Jaadi
Physiotherapists	(Saudi Arabia) Rayan Al-Nakhli
Kit manager	(Saudi Arabia) Osama Baessa

== Honours ==
Al-Safa Club champions have accomplished several high achievements on the single and team games at the local and international levels. Some of these are listed below

=== Football ===
After almost 60 years in the third division, Al-Safa football team was able to win the third division's league in 2011 and qualified to the second division. The team didn't stay long in the second division and was able to qualify to the Saudi's League first division for professionals in 2014 for the first time in History.

Championship	Position	President	Team Captain	Team Manager
Saudi's League Third Division	First Place	(Saudi Arabia) Sameer Al-Nasir	(Saudi Arabia) Mofeed Salah	(Saudi Arabia) Redha Al-Janabi
Saudi's League Second Division	Second Place	(Saudi Arabia) Ali Al-Mousa	(Saudi Arabia) Habib Al-Ahmad	(Saudi Arabia) Redha Al-Janabi

=== Athletics ===
In Athletics, Al-Safa Club has produced many champions on the local and international levels. The most famous of them all is the Asian Long Jump record holder Mohammed Al-Khuwalidi who owns the Asian record of 8.48 (List of Asian records in athletics) m in long Jump that he was able to achieve in France in 2006. The other athletics champions who also participated in the World's Championship and/ or the Olympic games include: Asem Al-Hizam in Decathlon, Abdullah Taher in High Jump, Hashim Al-Shorafa in 400 meters and Hussain Asem in Pole Vault

The Saudi records are registered under Al-Safa champions in the following:

Name	Game	Saudi Record
(Saudi Arabia) Mohammed Al-Khuwalidi	Long Jump	8.48 Meter
(Saudi Arabia) Hussain Asem Al-Hizam	Pole Vault	5.70 meter

=== Swimming ===
In swimming, the most famous Saudi swimmer in history (Alawi Maki) is the dominant figure in the club. Alawi was the first Saudi and Middle Eastern swimming who successfully crossed the English Channel between UK and France. He broke the English Channel crossing record and accompanied him in this achievement the late Saleh Ajaj, Malik Shaker, Fakher Al-Sadah, Saeed Quraish and the current club's vice president Dheya Al-Asaad.

=== Handball ===
Al-Safa club is one of Saudi's best teams in Handball. The team has accomplished several advanced positions in the league and club and the team members participated with the Saudi National Team in world cup several times. Among those who participated in the world cup: Hashim Al-Shorafa, Ali AL-Dawood, Bashir Qurainawi, Mohammed Al-Zayer, Hussain Henabi and Mohammed Nasfan.

Championship	Position	Team's Captain
Prince Sultan Bin Fahad Cup 1998	Second Place	(Saudi Arabia) Hashim Al-Shorafa
Prince Faisal Elite Cup 2002	Third Place	Bashir Qurainawi

=== Volleyball ===
Al-Safa club remained for several decades among the best three clubs in volleyball in Saudi (in addition to Al-Ahli and Al-Hilal). Several Team players have participated with the national Saudi team including: Nouri Al-Sadah, Abdulkarim Al-Fraid, Yahya Al-Marhoon and Faiz Al-Dawood.

=== Squash ===
In Squash, Al-Safa team is one of the best teams in Saudi Arabia. The players have participated with the national Saudi team in the regional and international competitions. Among those: Fadi Henabi, Akram Al-Safwani, Ali Quraish and Hussain Al-Sadiq

== Current squad ==
Note: Flags indicate national team as defined under FIFA eligibility rules; some limited exceptions apply. Players may hold more than one non-FIFA nationality.

No.	Pos.	Nation	Player
1	GK	KSA	Moslem Al Freej
2	DF	KSA	Ahmed Al-Hafith
3	DF	KSA	Mortadha Wakheek
4	DF	MTN	Sid' Ahmed Ablla
6	MF	KSA	Abdulelah Al-Shehri
7	MF	KSA	Habib Al-Ahmed
8	MF	KSA	Hussain Al-Sheikh
9	FW	BRA	Wildson Índio
10	FW	KSA	Mohammad Al-Sahlawi
11	MF	KSA	Saeed Al-Zahrani
13	DF	KSA	Mohammed Al-Bladi
14	MF	KSA	Eid Al-Qahtani
17	FW	CGO	Bakaki Anaël

No.	Pos.	Nation	Player
18	DF	KSA	Mohammed Al-Saleh
19	MF	KSA	Misfer Al-Qahtani
22	MF	EGY	Ahmed Azema
24	DF	KSA	Saleh Al-Otaibi
27	DF	KSA	Awadh Khrees
29	MF	KSA	Ahmed Al-Jamaan
66	FW	KSA	Jawad Okeek
77	FW	KSA	Mutab Al-Najrani
79	GK	KSA	Hussain Al-Marhoon
88	GK	KSA	Rawaf Al-Malah
99	FW	KSA	Faisal Al-Dossari
—	DF	KSA	Nawaf Al-Mufarrij
—	MF	KSA	Hussain Al-Hajoj

== See also ==
- List of football clubs in Saudi Arabia
