= Ramon Lopes =

Brazilian footballer (born 1989)

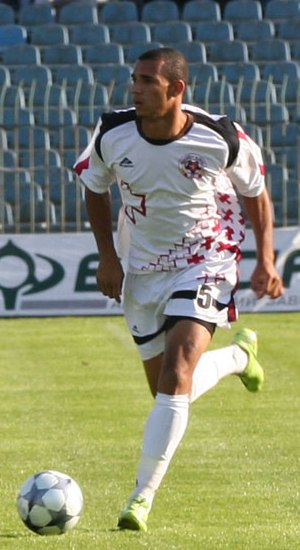
- Lopes in 2009

Personal information
- Full name: Ramon Lopes de Freitas
- Date of birth: August 7, 1989 (age 37)
- Place of birth: Belo Horizonte, Brazil
- Height: 1.85 m (6 ft 1 in)
- Positions: Striker; left midfielder

Youth career
- 2007: Fluminense
- 2008: Cruzeiro

Senior career*
| Years | Team | Apps | (Gls) |
| 2009–2013 | Volyn Lutsk | 79 | (8) |
| 2013 | Levski Sofia | 3 | (0) |
| 2013–2014 | Volyn Lutsk | 12 | (1) |
| 2014–2016 | Vegalta Sendai | 63 | (18) |
| 2017–2018 | Kashiwa Reysol | 24 | (3) |
| 2018–2020 | Vegalta Sendai | 36 | (7) |
| 2020–2021 | Khor Fakkan | 28 | (14) |
| 2021–2022 | Al-Fayha | 25 | (6) |
| 2022 | Khor Fakkan | 5 | (1) |
- * Club domestic league appearances and goals as of 18 March 2022

Ramon Lopes de Freitas (born August 7, 1989) is a Brazilian footballer. Lopes plays mainly as a striker or left midfielder.

== Club career ==
Ramon Lopes started his professional career in the team of Fluminense followed by a 1-year period of playing in Cruzeiro. In early 2009 Ramon Lopes was transferred to Ukrainian side Volyn Lutsk where he played in 78 games for 4,5 years, scoring 8 goals.

In the summer of 2013, his contract expired and on 7 June 2013 Lopes was presented as a new player of Bulgarian side Levski Sofia. He signed with the Bulgarians until 2015, but in August 2013 he again signed a contract, as a free agent, with FC Volyn. In June 2014, his transfer to Vegalta Sendai of J League was announced.

On 29 July 2021, Lopes joined Al-Fayha. On 19 May 2022, he scored the equalizer for Al-Fayha against Al Hilal in the 2022 King Cup Final, which his club eventually won by 3–1 on penalties.

On 15 September 2022, Lopes joined Khor Fakkan.

== Club statistics ==
Updated to 25 December 2022.

| Club performance | | | League | | Cup | | League Cup | | Continental | | Total | |
| Season | Club | League | Apps | Goals | Apps | Goals | Apps | Goals | Apps | Goals | Apps | Goals |
| Ukraine | | | League | | Ukrainian Cup | | League Cup | | Europe | | Total | |
|---|---|---|---|---|---|---|---|---|---|---|---|---|
| 2009–10 | Volyn Lutsk | Ukrainian First League | 9 | 0 | - | | - | | - | | 9 | 0 |
| 2009–10 | Volyn Lutsk | Ukrainian First League | 31 | 4 | 4 | 2 | - | | - | | 35 | 6 |
| 2010–11 | Volyn Lutsk | Ukrainian Premier League | 7 | 0 | 0 | 0 | - | | - | | 7 | 0 |
| 2011–12 | Volyn Lutsk | Ukrainian Premier League | 19 | 1 | 4 | 4 | - | | - | | 23 | 5 |
| 2012–13 | Volyn Lutsk | Ukrainian Premier League | 13 | 3 | 1 | 0 | - | | - | | 14 | 3 |
| Bulgaria | | | League | | Bulgarian Cup | | League Cup | | Europe | | Total | |
| 2013–14 | Levski Sofia | A Group | 3 | 0 | - | | - | | 2 | 0 | 5 | 0 |
| Ukraine | | | League | | Ukrainian Cup | | League Cup | | Europe | | Total | |
| 2013–14 | Volyn Lutsk | Ukrainian Premier League | 12 | 1 | 1 | 0 | - | | - | | 13 | 1 |
| Japan | | | League | | Emperor's Cup | | J. League Cup | | Asia | | Total | |
| 2014 | Vegalta Sendai | J1 League | 5 | 1 | - | | - | | - | | 5 | 1 |
| 2015 | Vegalta Sendai | J1 League | 26 | 7 | 4 | 0 | 3 | 0 | - | | 33 | 7 |
| 2016 | Vegalta Sendai | J1 League | 32 | 10 | 1 | 0 | 5 | 1 | - | | 38 | 11 |
| 2017 | Kashiwa Reysol | J1 League | 18 | 3 | 4 | 2 | 4 | 0 | - | | 26 | 3 |
| 2018 | Kashiwa Reysol | J1 League | 6 | 0 | 1 | 2 | 0 | 0 | 6 | 1 | 13 | 3 |
| 2018 | Vegalta Sendai | J1 League | 6 | 1 | - | | - | | - | | 6 | 1 |
| 2019 | Vegalta Sendai | J1 League | 30 | 6 | 2 | 3 | 2 | 0 | - | | 34 | 9 |
| United Arab Emirates | | | League | | UAE President's Cup | | UAE League Cup | | Asia | | Total | |
| 2019–20 | Khor Fakkan | UAE Pro League | 6 | 3 | - | | - | | - | | 6 | 3 |
| 2020–21 | Khor Fakkan | UAE Pro League | 22 | 11 | 1 | 0 | 4 | 1 | - | | 27 | 12 |
| Saudi Arabia | | | League | | King Cup | | League Cup | | Asia | | Total | |
| 2021–22 | Al-Fayha | Saudi Pro League | 25 | 6 | 4 | 2 | - | | - | | 29 | 8 |
| United Arab Emirates | | | League | | UAE President's Cup | | UAE League Cup | | Asia | | Total | |
| 2022–23 | Khor Fakkan | UAE Pro League | 5 | 0 | 1 | 0 | 3 | 0 | - | | 9 | 0 |
| Total | | | 275 | 56 | 28 | 15 | 21 | 2 | 8 | 1 | 342 | 75 |

== Honours ==
Al-Fayha

- King Cup: 2021–22
