= Moslem Al-Freej =

Saudi Arabian footballer

Personal information
- Full name: Moslem Zaki Al-Freej
- Date of birth: 8 April 1988 (age 38)
- Place of birth: Ras Tanura, Saudi Arabia
- Height: 1.85 m (6 ft 1 in)
- Position: Goalkeeper

Team information
- Current team: Al-Safa
- Number: 1

Youth career
- Al-Taraji

Senior career*
| Years | Team | Apps | (Gls) |
| 2008–2017 | Al-Khaleej | | |
| 2017–2023 | Al-Fayha | 64 | (0) |
| 2023– | Al-Safa | 0 | (0) |
- * Club domestic league appearances and goals as of 31 May 2023

Moslem Zaki Al-Freej (Arabic: مسلم آل فريج; born 8 April 1988) is a Saudi professional footballer who plays as a goalkeeper for Al-Safa.

== Career ==
On 4 June 2017, Al-Freej joined Al-Fayha.

On 16 June 2023, he joined Saudi First Division side Al-Safa on a free transfer.

== Honours ==
Al-Khaleej

- First Division League runners-up: 2013–14

Al-Fayha

- King Cup: 2021–22
