= Malek Al-Abdulmenem =

Saudi footballer (born 1998)

Malek Al-Abdulmenem مالك العبد المنعم
Personal information
- Full name: Malek Saad Al-Abdulmenem
- Date of birth: 8 March 1998 (age 28)
- Place of birth: Saudi Arabia
- Position: Striker

Team information
- Current team: Al-Fayha
- Number: 9

Youth career
- 2013–2016: Al-Zulfi
- 2017–2018: Al-Hilal

Senior career*
Years	Team	Apps	(Gls)
2016–2017	Al-Zulfi	12	(8)
2017	→ Al-Kholood (loan)	5	(4)
2018	Al-Jabalain	0	(0)
2019–2020	Al-Kholood	10	(6)
2020–2022	Al-Taawoun	11	(1)
2021–2022	→ Al-Fayha (loan)	22	(4)
2022–	Al-Fayha	3	(0)
- * Club domestic league appearances and goals

Malek Al-Abdulmenem (Arabic: مالك العبد المنعم; born 8 March 1998) is a Saudi Arabian professional footballer who plays as a striker for Al-Fayha.

== Career ==
Al-Abdulmenem began his career at the youth team of Al-Zulfi. He participated with the first team in the Saudi Third Division in 2016 and 2017. Al-Abdulmenem joined Al-Kholood on loan from Al-Zulfi in Saudi Third Division in 2017 and helped them achieve promotion to the Saudi Second Division. He was also the top scorer of the promotion play-offs. On 16 June 2017, Al-Abdulmenem joined Al-Hilal's U23 team. On 19 August 2018, Al-Abdulmenem joined Al-Jabalain. On 23 January 2019, Al-Abdulmenem joined Al-Kholood. On 29 January 2020, Al-Abdulemenem signed a four-year contract with Pro League club Al-Taawoun. On 30 June 2021, Al-Abdulmenem joined Al-Fayha on loan. On 30 January 2022, Al-Abdulmenem joined Al-Fayha on a permanent deal.

== Career statistics ==
=== Club ===
As of match played 27 May 2024

Club	Season	League			King Cup		Asia		Other		Total	
Club	Season	Division	Apps	Goals	Apps	Goals	Apps	Goals	Apps	Goals	Apps	Goals
Al-Zulfi	2015–16	Third Division	5	3	0	0	—		—		5	3
Al-Zulfi	2016–17	Third Division	7	5	3	0	—		—		10	5
Al-Zulfi	Total		12	8	3	0	0	0	0	0	15	8
Al-Kholood (loan)	2016–17	Third Division	5	4	0	0	—		—		5	4
Al-Hilal	2017–18	SPL	0	0	0	0	0	0	2 (Note: Appearances in Arab Club Championship)	0	2	0
Al-Jabalain	2018–19	MSL	0	0	0	0	—		—		0	0
Al-Kholood	2019–20	Second Division	10	6	1	0	—		—		11	6
Al-Taawoun	2019–20	SPL	4	0	0	0	0	0	—		4	0
Al-Taawoun	2020–21	SPL	7	1	0	0	—		—		7	1
Al-Taawoun	Total		11	1	0	0	0	0	0	0	11	1
Al-Fayha (loan)	2021–22	SPL	22	4	3	1	—		—		25	5
Al-Fayha	2022–23	SPL	2	0	0	0	—		0	0	2	0
Al-Fayha	2023–24	SPL	1	0	2	2	1	0	—		4	2
Al-Fayha	Total		25	4	5	3	1	0	0	0	31	7
Career total			63	23	9	3	1	0	2	0	75	26

== Honours ==
Al-Kholood

- Saudi Third Division: 2016–17

Al-Fayha

- King Cup: 2021–22
