= Ahmed Bamsaud =

Saudi Arabian footballer

Personal information
- Full name: Ahmed Mohammed Bamsaud
- Date of birth: 22 November 1995 (age 30)
- Place of birth: Riyadh, Saudi Arabia
- Height: 1.75 m (5 ft 9 in)
- Position: Left back

Team information
- Current team: Al-Fayha
- Number: 18

Youth career
- Al-Hilal

Senior career*
Years	Team	Apps	(Gls)
2017–2018	Al-Hilal	0	(0)
2017–2018	→ Al-Fayha (loan)	5	(0)
2018–2022	Al-Fayha	86	(3)
2022–2025	Al-Ittihad	36	(1)
2025	→ Al-Ettifaq (loan)	7	(0)
2025–	Al-Fayha	0	(0)

International career^{‡}
2015–2017	Saudi Arabia U23		
2022–	Saudi Arabia	7	(0)
- * Club domestic league appearances and goals as of 23 December 2023 ‡ National team caps and goals as of 12 September 2023

Ahmed Mohammed Bamsaud (Arabic: أحمد محمد بامسعود; born 22 November 1995) is a Saudi Arabian professional footballer who plays as a left back for Al-Fayha.

== Club career ==
Bamsaud joined Al-Hilal's U23 team on 10 June 2015. He signed his first professional contract with the club on 31 August 2016. On 20 June 2017, he joined Al-Fayha on loan from Al-Hilal for the 2017–18 season. On 5 June 2018, Bamsaud joined Al-Fayha on a permanent three-year deal. On 30 January 2020, he renewed his contract with Al-Fayha for another two years. On 19 May 2022, Bamsaud started the 2022 King Cup final and helped Al-Fayha win their first-ever King Cup title. On 29 August 2022, he joined Al-Ittihad on a three-year contract. On 12 January 2025, Bamsaud joined Al-Ettifaq on a six-month loan.

On 30 June 2025, Bamsaud joined Al-Fayha on a three-year deal.

== Career statistics ==
=== Club ===
As of match played 27 May 2024

Club	Season	League			King Cup		Asia		Other		Total	
Club	Season	Division	Apps	Goals	Apps	Goals	Apps	Goals	Apps	Goals	Apps	Goals
Al-Fayha	2017–18	SPL	5	0	0	0	—		1 (Note: Appearances in Crown Prince Cup)	0	6	0
Al-Fayha	2018–19	SPL	9	0	3	0	—		—		12	0
Al-Fayha	2019–20	SPL	25	1	3	1	—		—		27	2
Al-Fayha	2020–21	MSL	22	1	—		—		—		22	1
Al-Fayha	2021–22	SPL	29	1	4	0	—		—		33	1
Al-Fayha	2022–23	SPL	1	0	0	0	—		0	0	1	0
Al-Fayha	Total		91	3	10	1	0	0	1	0	102	4
Al-Ittihad	2022–23	SPL	21	1	3	0	—		0	0	24	1
Al-Ittihad	2023–24	SPL	15	0	2	0	5	0	6 (Note: Four appearances and one goal in Arab Club Champions Cup, and two appearances in FIFA Club World Cup)	1	28	1
Al-Ittihad	Total		36	1	5	0	5	0	6	1	52	2
Al-Ettifaq (loan)	2024–25	SPL	7	0	0	0	—		4 (Note: Appearances in AGCFF Gulf Club Champions League)	0	11	0
Al-Fayha	2025–26	SPL	0	0	0	0	—		—		0	0
Career total			134	4	15	1	5	0	11	1	165	6

== Honours ==
Al-Fayha

- King Cup: 2021–22

Al-Ittihad

- Saudi Professional League: 2022–23
- Saudi Super Cup: 2022
