= Abdullah Al-Dossari (born 1993) =

Saudi Arabian footballer (born 1993)

Personal information
- Full name: Abdullah Mohammed Al-Dossari
- Date of birth: August 27, 1993 (age 33)
- Place of birth: Saudi Arabia
- Position: Midfielder

Youth career
- Sdoos

Senior career*
Years	Team	Apps	(Gls)
2013–2017	Sdoos		
2017–2018	Al-Kawkab		
2018–2019	Al-Mujazzal		
2019–2020	Al-Batin	16	(2)
2020–2022	Al-Fayha	35	(6)
2022–2023	Al-Arabi	33	(3)
2023–2024	Al-Faisaly	31	(1)
2024–2026	Al-Diriyah		
- * Club domestic league appearances and goals as of 31 May 2023

Abdullah Al-Dossari (Arabic: عبدالله الدوسري; born 27 August 1993) is a Saudi Arabian professional footballer who plays as a midfielder.

== Club career ==
Al-Dossari started his career at Sdoos where he spent four seasons at the club. On 15 August 2017, Al-Dossari joined Al-Kawkab, where he spent one season. On 20 August 2018, Al-Dossari joined Al-Mujazzal. On 22 July 2019, Al-Dossari joined Al-Batin. He made 16 appearances and scored twice as Al-Batin were crowned champions and earned promotion to the Pro League. On 5 October 2020, Al-Dossari joined relegated side Al-Fayha. He scored 6 times in 32 appearances and helped Al-Fayha finish second and earn promotion to the Pro League. On 3 July 2021, Al-Dossari renewed his contract with Al-Fayha. On 23 July 2022, Al-Dossari joined First Division side Al-Arabi.

On 2 July 2023, Al-Dossari joined Al-Faisaly. On 26 July 2024, Al-Dossari joined Second Division side Al-Diriyah.

== Honours ==
Al-Batin

- MS League: 2019–20

Al-Fayha

- MS League runner-up: 2020–21
- King Cup: 2021–22
