= Hussain Al-Sheikh =

Saudi Arabian footballer

Personal information
- Full name: Hussain Saeed Jawad Al-Sheikh
- Date of birth: 8 December 1990 (age 35)
- Place of birth: Qatif, Saudi Arabia
- Position: Midfielder

Team information
- Current team: Al-Safa
- Number: 8

Youth career
- Mudhar

Senior career*
Years	Team	Apps	(Gls)
2010–2011	Mudhar		
2011–2019	Al-Khaleej		
2019–2020	Ohod	16	(5)
2020	Al-Qadsiah	12	(2)
2020–2021	Al-Sahel	7	(0)
2021	Al-Fayha	14	(0)
2021–2022	Al-Taraji		
2022–2023	Al-Jandal		
2023–2024	Al-Jubail		
2024–2025	Al-Nahda		
2025–	Al-Safa		
- * Club domestic league appearances and goals

Hussain Al-Sheikh (Arabic: حسين الشيخ; born 8 December 1990) is a Saudi footballer who plays for Al-Safa as a midfielder.

== Career ==
On 31 January 2021, Al-Sheikh joined Al-Fayha.

On 22 July 2022, Al-Sheikh joined Al-Jandal.

On 10 September 2023, Al-Sheikh joined Al-Jubail.

On 4 October 2025, Al-Sheikh joined Al-Safa.

== Honours ==
Al-Khaleej

- First Division runner-up: 2013–14

Al-Qadsiah

- MS League runner-up: 2019–20

Al-Fayha

- MS League runner-up: 2020–21
