= Talal Majrashi =

Saudi Arabian footballer (born 1990)

Personal information
- Full name: Talal Mohammed Majrashi
- Date of birth: 10 September 1990 (age 36)
- Place of birth: Dammam, Saudi Arabia
- Height: 1.76 m (5 ft 9 1/2 in)
- Position: Winger

Team information
- Current team: Al-Hada
- Number: 50

Youth career
- Al-Ettifaq

Senior career*
Years	Team	Apps	(Gls)
2012–2017	Al-Khaleej		
2017–2021	Al-Fayha	36	(8)
2018	→ Al-Ettifaq (loan)	1	(0)
2018	→ Ohod (loan)	0	(0)
2019	→ Al-Ain (loan)	18	(3)
2019–2020	→ Al-Ain (loan)	31	(5)
2021	Damac	0	(0)
2021–2022	Al-Qadsiah	6	(0)
2022	Al-Taraji	12	(2)
2022–2023	Al-Sahel	20	(3)
2023–2024	Hajer	27	(3)
2024–2025	Al-Faisaly	3	(1)
2025	Al-Lewaa		
2025–	Al-Hada		
- * Club domestic league appearances and goals as of 31 May 2021

Talal Majrashi (Arabic: طلال مجرشي; born 10 September 1990) is a professional footballer who plays as winger for Al-Hada.

== Career ==
Majrashi started his career at the youth teams of Al-Ettifaq before joining Al-Khaleej. During the 2013–14 season, Majrashi helped Al-Khaleej reached promotion to the Pro League. Following the club's relegation to the First Division during the 2016–17 season, Majrashi left the club. On 4 June 2017, Majrashi joined newly promoted side Al-Fayha. On 21 January 2018, Majrashi returned to Al-Ettifaq, but this time on loan from Al-Fayha. On 8 June 2018, he joined Ohod on loan. The loan was cut short on 11 December 2018. On 1 January 2019, Majrashi joined First Division side Al-Ain. His loan was renewed on 17 June 2019. During the 2019–20 season, Majrashi helped Al-Ain earn promotion to the Pro League for the first time in history. Majrashi returned to Al-Fayha during the 2020–21 season and helped reach promotion to the Pro League. On 7 June 2021, Majrashi joined Damac; however, he left the club without making a single appearance. On 27 August 2021, Majrashi joined First Division side Al-Qadsiah. On 3 January 2022, Majrashi joined Second Division side Al-Taraji. On 9 June 2022, Majrashi joined First Division side Al-Sahel. On 16 June 2023, Majrashi joined Hajer. On 1 August 2024, Majrashi joined Al-Faisaly. On 9 February 2025, Majrashi joined Second Division side Al-Lewaa.

== Honours ==
Al-Khaleej

- First Division/MS League runner-up: 2013–14 (promotion to the Pro League)

Al-Ain

- First Division/MS League third place: 2019–20 (promotion to the Pro League)

Al-Fayha

- First Division/MS League runner-up: 2020–21 (promotion to the Pro League)
