= Ahmed Al-Suhail =

Saudi Arabian footballer

Personal information
- Full name: Ahmed Saad Yousef Al-Suhail
- Date of birth: October 31, 1988 (age 38)
- Place of birth: Saudi Arabia
- Height: 1.77 m (5 ft 10 in)
- Position: Midfielder

Youth career
- Al-Ettifaq

Senior career*
Years	Team	Apps	(Gls)
2009–2011	Al-Ettifaq	6	(0)
2010–2011	→ Al-Taawoun (loan)	4	(0)
2011–2012	Al-Suqoor		
2012–2013	Al-Najma		
2013–2015	Najran	39	(1)
2015–2016	Al-Taawoun	8	(0)
2016–2018	Najran	50	(7)
2018–2019	Al-Nojoom		
2019–2020	Najran	27	(1)
2020–2021	Al-Fayha	33	(0)
2021–2022	Al-Ain	17	(0)
- * Club domestic league appearances and goals

Ahmed Al-Suhail (Arabic: أحمد السهيل; born 31 October 1988) is a Saudi football player who plays as a midfielder.
