= Hamad Al-Juhaim =

Saudi Arabian footballer

Personal information
- Full name: Hamad Saud Al-Juhaim
- Date of birth: October 12, 1987 (age 39)
- Place of birth: Saudi Arabia
- Height: 1.74 m (5 ft 9 in)
- Position: Forward

Team information
- Current team: Al-Ula
- Number: 9

Youth career
- Al-Tai

Senior career*
Years	Team	Apps	(Gls)
2007–2015	Al-Ta'ee		
2015	→ Al-Raed (loan)	4	(0)
2015–2019	Al-Fateh	72	(13)
2019–2021	Al-Fayha	44	(10)
2021–2022	Ohod	26	(7)
2022–2023	Al-Jabalain	23	(2)
2023–	Al-Ula	8	(0)

International career^{‡}
2012–	Saudi Arabia	2	(0)
- * Club domestic league appearances and goals as of 3 February 2018 ‡ National team caps and goals as of 20:31, 22 December 2017 (UTC)

Hamad Al-Juhaim (Arabic: حمد الجهيم; born October 12, 1987) is a Saudi professional footballer who plays for Al-Ula as a forward.

On 18 June 2022, Al-Juhaim joined Al-Jabalain. On 7 August 2023, Al-Juhaim joined Al-Ula.

== Honours ==
Al-Fayha

- First Division runner-up: 2020–21 (promotion to the Pro League)

Al-Ula

- Saudi Third Division: 2023–24
