= Abdullah Al-Tofail =

Saudi Arabian footballer

Personal information
- Full name: Abdullah Sulaiman Al-Tofail
- Date of birth: February 23, 1992 (age 34)
- Place of birth: Saudi Arabia
- Height: 1.77 m (5 ft 9 1/2 in)
- Position: Winger

Youth career
- Al-Shoulla

Senior career*
Years	Team	Apps	(Gls)
2013–2020	Al-Shoulla	93	(10)
2020–2021	Al-Fayha	17	(1)
2022	Al-Shoulla	14	(1)
- * Club domestic league appearances and goals as of 31 May 2021

Abdullah Al-Tofail (born 23 February 1992) is a Saudi football player who plays as a winger.
