= Mohammed Al-Baqawi =

Saudi Arabian footballer

Personal information
- Full name: Mohammed Kareem Al-Baqawi
- Date of birth: July 12, 1995 (age 31)
- Place of birth: Baqaa, Saudi Arabia
- Height: 1.70 m (5 ft 7 in)
- Position: Right back

Team information
- Current team: Al-Fayha
- Number: 22

Youth career
- –2013: Al-Tai
- 2013–2017: Al-Hilal

Senior career*
Years	Team	Apps	(Gls)
2017–2019	Al-Hilal	3	(0)
2017–2018	→ Al-Fayha (loan)	20	(0)
2019–2021	Al-Shabab	12	(0)
2020	→ Al-Fayha (loan)	13	(0)
2020–	Al-Fayha	118	(0)

International career
2013–2015	Saudi Arabia U20		
2015–2017	Saudi Arabia U23		
- * Club domestic league appearances and goals as of 27 May 2024

Mohammed Al-Baqawi (Arabic: محمد البقعاوي; born 12 July 1995) is a Saudi Arabian professional footballer who plays as a right back for Al-Fayha.

== Club career ==
Al-Baqawi started his career at the youth team of Al-Tai. Al-Baqawi joined the youth team Al-Hilal on 15 July 2013. On 18 June 2017, Al-Baqawi joined Al-Fayha on a one-year loan. He returned to Al-Hilal following the conclusion of his loan and was made part of the squad for the 2018–2019 season. On 2 February 2019, he joined Al-Shabab in a swap plus cash deal which saw Hattan Bahebri join Al-Hilal. On 29 January 2020, he joined Al-Fayha on a six-month loan from Al-Shabab. On 9 October 2020, Al-Baqawi signed a three-year contract with Al-Fayha.

== Honours ==
Al-Fayha

- King Cup: 2021–22
- MS League runner-up: 2020–21
