= Ibrahim Al-Harbi (footballer, born 1995) =

Saudi Arabian footballer

Personal information
- Full name: Ibrahim Marshad Al-Jaberi Al-Harbi
- Date of birth: July 26, 1995 (age 31)
- Place of birth: Medina, Saudi Arabia
- Height: 1.67 m (5 ft 6 in)
- Position: Midfielder

Team information
- Current team: Al-Jandal
- Number: 15

Youth career
- Al-Ansar

Senior career*
Years	Team	Apps	(Gls)
2015–2020	Al-Ansar		
2020–2022	Al-Fayha	35	(5)
2022	→ Al-Jabalain (loan)	17	(1)
2022–2023	Al-Arabi	28	(1)
2023–2024	Al-Orobah	20	(2)
2024–	Al-Jandal		
- * Club domestic league appearances and goals as of 31 May 2021

Ibrahim Al-Harbi (Arabic: إبراهيم الحربي; born 26 July 1995) is a Saudi Arabian professional footballer who plays as a midfielder for Al-Jandal.

== Club career ==
Al-Harbi started his career at Al-Ansar and made his debut in the 2015–16 season. During the 2017–18 season, Al-Harbi helped Al-Ansar finish fourth and earn promotion to the MS League. On 10 October 2020, Al-Harbi joined Al-Fayha on a three-year contract. He scored 5 times in 32 appearances and helped Al-Fayha finish second and earn promotion to the Pro League. On 26 January 2022, Al-Harbi joined Al-Jabalain on loan. On 24 July 2022, Al-Harbi joined First Division side Al-Arabi.

On 10 July 2023, Al-Harbi joined Al-Orobah. On 28 July 2024, Al-Harbi joined Al-Jandal.

== Honours ==
Al-Fayha

- MS League runner-up: 2020–21

Al-Orobah

- First Division League runner-up: 2023–24
