= Abdullah Al-Dossari (born 1990) =

Saudi Arabian footballer (born 1990)

Abdullah Al-Dawsari
Personal information
- Full name: Abdullah Mubarak Al-Dawsari
- Date of birth: 23 June 1990 (age 36)
- Place of birth: Saudi Arabia
- Height: 1.78 m (5 ft 10 in)
- Position: Defender

Senior career*
Years	Team	Apps	(Gls)
2010–2013	Al-Hilal	6	(0)
2013–2014	→ Al-Nahda (loan)	19	(0)
2014–2015	Al-Shabab	0	(0)
2015–2018	Al-Fateh	56	(0)
2018–2020	Al-Washm		
2020–2021	Al-Fayha	5	(0)
2021–2022	Al-Shoulla	35	(0)
2022–2024	Al-Sahel		

International career^{‡}
2012	Saudi Arabia	3	(0)
- * Club domestic league appearances and goals as of 00:52, 3 February 2018 (UTC) ‡ National team caps and goals as of 00:52, 20 November 2016 (UTC)

Abdullah Al-Dawsari (Arabic: عبد الله الدوسري; born 23 June 1990) is a Saudi professional footballer who currently plays as a defender.

== Honours ==
=== Club ===
Al-Hilal

- Saudi Professional League: 2009–10, 2010–11
- Saudi Crown Prince Cup: 2009–10, 2010–11, 11–12, 2012–13
