= 2021–22 King's Cup (Saudi Arabia) =

2021–22 King Cup
Custodian of the Two Holy Mosques Cup

Tournament details
- Country: Saudi Arabia
- Dates: 20 December 2021 – 19 May 2022
- Teams: 16

Final positions
- Champions: Al-Fayha (1st title)
- Runners-up: Al-Hilal

Tournament statistics
- Matches played: 15
- Goals scored: 44 (2.93 per match)
- Top goal scorer(s): Carlos (4 goals)
- All statistics correct as of 19 May 2022.

The 2021–22 King Cup, or The Custodian of the Two Holy Mosques Cup, was the 47th edition of the King Cup since its establishment in 1957. The tournament began on 19 December 2021 and concluded with the final on 19 May 2022.

The number of teams remained 16 due to the congested fixture schedule which will see the Saudi national team participate in the 2022 FIFA World Cup qualifiers and the 2021 FIFA Arab Cup. The competition was limited to the 16 teams participating in the 2021–22 Saudi Professional League.

Al-Faisaly are the defending champions after winning their first title last season. They were eliminated by Al-Ahli in the round of 16.

Al-Fayha won their first King Cup title by beating Al-Hilal on penalties in the final following a 1–1 draw after extra time. In doing so, they became the 10th different team to win the King Cup. As winners of the competition, Al-Fayha qualified for the 2023–24 AFC Champions League qualifying play-offs.

== Participating teams ==
A total of 16 teams participated in this season. All of which compete in the Pro League.

League	Teams
Pro League	Abha; Al-Ahli; Al-Batin; Al-Ettifaq; Al-Faisaly ^{TH}; Al-Fateh; Al-Fayha; Al-Hazem; Al-Hilal; Al-Ittihad; Al-Nassr; Al-Raed; Al-Shabab; Al-Taawoun; Al-Tai; Damac

== Bracket ==
Round of 16
H	Al-Fayha	4
A	Abha	0
A	Al-Hazem	0
H	Al-Batin	1
H	Al-Taawoun	3
A	Al-Tai	2
A	Al-Ittihad	3
H	Al-Fateh	2
A	Al-Ettifaq	0
H	Al-Nassr	1
H	Al-Hilal	2
A	Al-Raed	0
A	Al-Faisaly	1
H	Al-Ahli	2
A	Damac	0
H	Al-Shabab	5

Quarter-finals
A	Al-Fayha (a.e.t.)	2
H	Al-Batin	1
H	Al-Taawoun	1
A	Al-Ittihad	2
H	Al-Nassr	1
A	Al-Hilal	2
A	Al-Ahli	1
H	Al-Shabab	2

Semi-finals
H	Al-Fayha	1
A	Al-Ittihad	0
H	Al-Hilal (a.e.t.)	2
A	Al-Shabab	1

Final
-	Al-Fayha (p)	1 (3)
-	Al-Hilal	1 (1)

Note: H: Home team, A: Away team

Source: SAFF

== Round of 16 ==
The draw for the whole tournament was held on 8 November 2021. The dates for the Round of 16 fixtures were announced on 22 November 2021. All times are local, AST (UTC+3).

19 December 2021 8	Al-Shabab (1)	5–0	Damac (1)	Riyadh
20:00	Al-Harbi 50'; Al-Qahtani (yellow card) 51'; Carlos 57', 60'; Chafaï 71' (o.g.); Al-Ammar 83'; Al-Abed (red card) 89'	Report	Al-Ammar (yellow card) 53'; Vittor (yellow card) 90'	Stadium: King Fahd International Stadium; Referee: Sultan Al-Harbi

20 December 2021 2	Al-Batin (1)	1–0	Al-Hazem (1)	Hafar al-Batin
15:05	Nasser (yellow card) 70'; Al-Shammari (yellow card) 90+4'; Abreu 90+5'	Report	Al-Obaid (yellow card) 56'; Abdullah S. (yellow card) 58'	Stadium: Al-Batin Club Stadium; Referee: Mohammed Al-Esmaiel

20 December 2021 4	Al-Fateh (1)	2–3	Al-Ittihad (1)	Al-Hasa
17:35	Al-Daheem (yellow card) 9'; Batna 17', 22', (yellow card) 90+7'; Lajami (yellow card) 39'; Santini (yellow card) 45+3'; Cueva (yellow card) 56' (yellow-red card) 90+4'; Kanabah (yellow card) 78'; Al-Fuhaid (yellow card) 90+4'	Report	Al-Aboud (yellow card) 13'; Romarinho 37' (pen.), 75'; Al-Shamrani (yellow card) 89'; Al-Sahafi (yellow card) 90+2'; Bruno Henrique 90+2'	Stadium: Prince Abdullah bin Jalawi Stadium; Referee: Khaled Salwi

20 December 2021 6	Al-Hilal (1)	2–0	Al-Raed (1)	Riyadh
20:00	Vietto 5'; Al-Shehri (yellow card) 6'; Carrillo 75'	Report	Fouzair (yellow card) 8'; Salem (yellow card) 15' (yellow-red card) 77'; Al-Farhan (yellow card) 77'	Stadium: King Fahd International Stadium; Referee: Sandro Schärer (Switzerland)

21 December 2021 1	Al-Fayha (1)	4–0	Abha (1)	Al Majma'ah
15:05	Tachtsidis 19' (pen.); Ryller (yellow card) 25'; Moutari (yellow card) 39', (goal) 47'; Al-Abdulmenem 44'; Lopes 83'	Report	Mboungou (yellow card) 18'; Atouchi (yellow card) 89'	Stadium: Al Majma'ah Sports City; Referee: Mohammed Al-Harbi

21 December 2021 5	Al-Nassr (1)	1–0	Al-Ettifaq (1)	Riyadh
17:50	Yahya (yellow card) 33'; Al-Amri (yellow card) 43'; K. Al-Ghannam 50'; Anselmo (yellow card) 81'; Al-Shammari (yellow card) 90+1'	Report	Al-Rubaie (yellow card) 19' (yellow-red card) 27'; Al-Mowalad (yellow card) 45+2'	Stadium: Mrsool Park; Referee: Szymon Marciniak (Poland)

21 December 2021 3	Al-Taawoun (1)	3–2	Al-Tai (1)	Buraidah
18:00	Tawamba 66', 90+2'; Kaku (yellow card) 69', (goal) 82'	Report	Dener 31'; Al-Johani 53'	Stadium: King Abdullah Sport City Stadium; Referee: Sultan Al-Okairy

21 December 2021 7	Al-Ahli (1)	2–1	Al-Faisaly (1)	Jeddah
18:25	Hindi (yellow card) 32'; Dankler 63'; Al Somah 88'; Al-Rubaie (yellow card) 90+2'; Hawsawi (yellow card) 90+4'; Al-Majhad (yellow card) 90+9'	Report	Barnawi (yellow card) 16'; Kaabi (yellow card) 30'; Amalfitano 45'; Rossi (yellow card) 90+5'	Stadium: Prince Abdullah Al-Faisal Stadium; Attendance: 7,516; Referee: Raed Al-Zahrani

== Quarter-finals ==
The dates for the Quarter-final fixtures were announced on 11 January 2022. All times are local, AST (UTC+3).

21 February 2022 9	Al-Batin (1)	1–2 (a.e.t.)	Al-Fayha (1)	Hafar al-Batin
15:55	El Jebli 66' (pen.); Sami (yellow card) 72'; Antônio (yellow card) 77'; Campaña (yellow card) 116'	Report	Trajkovski 56'; Bamsaud (yellow card) 70'; Al-Baqawi (yellow card) 94'; Tachtsidis 117'	Stadium: Al-Batin Club Stadium; Referee: Raed Al-Zahrani

21 February 2022 10	Al-Taawoun (1)	1–2	Al-Ittihad (1)	Buraidah
16:00	Abdullah (yellow card) 30'; Al-Nabit 53'; El Mahdioui (yellow card) 90+6'	Report	Al-Bishi 86'; Henrique (yellow card) 90+6'; Hamdallah 90+6' (pen.); André (yellow card) 90+9'	Stadium: King Abdullah Sport City Stadium; Referee: Nikola Dabanović (Montenegro)

21 February 2022 11	Al-Nassr (1)	1–2	Al-Hilal (1)	Riyadh
18:25	Talisca 17'; Martínez (yellow card) 23'; Rodríguez (yellow card) 44'; Aboubakar (yellow card) 76'; Al-Shammari (yellow card) 90+5'	Report	Al-Shahrani (yellow card) 25'; Al-Dawsari (yellow card) 43', (goal) 80' (pen.); Al-Bulaihi (yellow card) 49'; Ighalo 62'; Marega (yellow card) 81'	Stadium: Mrsool Park; Referee: Mustapha Ghorbal (Algeria)

21 February 2022 12	Al-Shabab (1)	2–1	Al-Ahli (1)	Riyadh
20:40	Carlos 49', 86' (pen.); Paulinho (yellow card) 73' (yellow-red card) 90+1'; Al-Sqoor (yellow card) 87'	Report	Ghareeb (yellow card) 27'; Bradarić 60'; Kom (yellow card) 70'; Yahya (yellow card) 73'; Dankler (yellow card) 84'	Stadium: Prince Faisal bin Fahd Stadium; Referee: Sergey Ivanov (Russia)

== Semi-finals ==
The dates for the Semi-final fixtures were announced on 6 March 2022. All times are local, AST (UTC+3).

3 April 2022 14	Al Hilal (1)	2–1	Al-Shabab (1)	Riyadh
22:00	Al-Shahrani (yellow card) 65'; Al-Faraj 73'; Ighalo 104'; Al-Shehri (yellow card) 113'	Report	N'Diaye (yellow card) 39'; Banega 63' (pen.); Al-Ammar (yellow card) 80'	Stadium: Prince Faisal bin Fahd Stadium; Referee: Roberto Tobar (Chile)

4 April 2022 13	Al-Fayha (1)	1–0	Al-Ittihad (1)	Al Majma'ah
22:00	Abousaban 36'	Report		Stadium: Al Majma'ah Sports City; Referee: Slavko Vinčić (Slovenia)

== Final ==
All times are local, AST (UTC+3).

19 May 2022
21:30

Al-Fayha	1–1 (a.e.t.)	Al-Hilal
Lopes 66'	Report	S. Al-Dawsari 45+4'
Penalties
Ryller (penalty missed); Lopes (penalty scored); Al-Zaqaan (penalty scored); Al-Shuwaish (penalty missed); Tachtsidis (penalty scored)	3–1	(penalty missed) Ighalo; (penalty missed) Al-Faraj; (penalty missed) Al-Hamdan; (penalty scored) Al-Juwayr

King Abdullah Sports City, Jeddah
Attendance: 46,533
Referee: Antonio Mateu Lahoz (Spain)

== Top goalscorers ==
As of 19 May 2022

Rank	Player	Club	Goals
1	(Brazil) Carlos	Al-Shabab	4
2	(Brazil) Romarinho	Al-Ittihad	2
2	(Cameroon) Léandre Tawamba	Al-Taawoun	2
2	(Morocco) Mourad Batna	Al-Fateh	2
2	(Greece) Panagiotis Tachtsidis	Al-Fayha	2
2	(Nigeria) Odion Ighalo	Al-Hilal	2
2	(Saudi Arabia) Salem Al-Dawsari	Al-Hilal	2
2	(Brazil) Ramon Lopes	Al-Fayha	2
