= Al-Fayha Club =

Association football club in Saudi Arabia

- Full name: Al-Fayha Club
- Nicknames: Al-Burtuqali (The Orange); Tawwahin Sudair (The Mills of Sudair)
- Founded: 1953; 73 years ago
- Ground: Al-Majma'ah Sports City Stadium
- Capacity: 7,000
- Chairman: Tawfiq Al-Modaiheem
- Head coach: Fábio Carille
- League: Saudi Pro League
- 2025–26: Pro League, 10th of 18
- Website: alfayhasc.com
Home colours	Away colours	Third colours

Al-Fayha Club (Arabic: نادي الفيحاء السعودي) is a professional football club based in Al-Majma'ah, that plays in the Saudi Pro League, the first tier of Saudi football.

Al-Fayha's colors are orange and blue, hence the nickname "Al-Burtuqali." Al-Fayha have won the Saudi Second Division once in the 2013–14 season and have finished runners-up once in the 2003–04. On 29 April 2017, Al-Fayha won their first promotion to the Pro League, winning their first First Division title on 5 May 2017. They won the King's Cup for the first time in 2022.

The club plays their home games at Al-Majma'ah Sports City Stadium in Al-Majma'ah, sharing the stadium with city rivals Al-Faisaly and Al-Mujazzel.

== History ==
Al Fayha (Arabic: الفيحاء, romanized: al-fayḥāʿ, lit. 'wide, extensive') was founded in 1953 in Al Majma'ah and were officially registered on August 15, 1966. Al Fayha is one of the oldest clubs in the country and the oldest club in Al Majma'ah. Al Fayha is a merging of two different clubs, Minikh and Al-Fayha, who joined to become the only representative of Al Majma'ah.

Since the formation of the club, Al Fayha has played a continuous role in the service of the youth in Al-Majma'ah. Al Fayha is considered to be one of the most active and interactive clubs in the city, often acting as a safe haven for the youth.

=== First piece of silverware ===
Al Fayha won their first promotion to the First Division in 1985 and spent five consecutive seasons in the First Division before getting relegated at the end of the 1989–90 season. After an absence of 14 years, Al-Fayha returned to the First Division after finishing as runners-up in the 2003–04 Second Division. Al Fayha spent 4 consecutive seasons in the First Division before getting relegated at the end of the 2007–08 season. They were then promoted once again during the 2013–14 season when they won the Second Division title. On 29 April 2017, Al-Fayha won promotion to the Pro League for the first time in their history following their 2–1 home win against Ohod. They were crowned champions of the 2016–17 Saudi First Division for the first time on 5 May 2017 after drawing Wej 1–1 away from home.

Al Fayha spent three consecutive seasons in the Saudi top flight, performing above expectations in their debut season and barely escaping relegation in their second season, however they couldn't avoid relegation in the 2019–20 season, losing 0–1 to Al-Taawoun in the final matchday. In their first season back in the Saudi First Division Al-Fayha managed to achieve promotion back to the top flight following a 0–0 home draw with Al-Tai on the 20th of May 2021, as well as finishing the season as runners-up with 81 points. In their first season back in the Pro League Al Fayha acquired the services of players such as; veteran Serbian goalkeeper Vladimir Stojković, Greek midfielder Panagiotis Tachtsidis and Macedonian international Aleksandar Trajkovski. Vuk Rašović managed his squad with a direct play approach along with disciplined organisation, and as a result the club has had the best defensive record in the 2021–22 league.

=== King Cup winners and AFC Champions League debut ===
Al Fayha partook in the 2021–22 King Cup, with their first match being against Abha whom they routed 4–0 to progress to the quarter-finals. In the quarter-final they faced Al-Batin, whom they beat 2–1. In the semi-final they were up against Al Ittihad in a highly contested and hard-fought match in which Al Fayha came up on top to win 1–0 and advance to a historic cup final. Al Fayha would face Al Hilal in the final.The two sides were locked at 1–1 after extra time with Al Fayha prevailing in the penalty shootout thanks to a superb performance from their Serbian goalkeeper Vladimir Stojkovic to clinch their maiden Saudi King's Cup at the King Abdullah Sports City Stadium and also qualified them to the first 2023–24 AFC Champions League group stage. On 3 October 2023 in the AFC Champions League group stage fixtures, Al-Fayha recorded their first win in a 2–0 victory against Pakhtakor of Uzbekistan with both goal scored by Abdelhamid Sabiri. Al Fayha finished as group runners-up with 9 points which send the club to the Round of 16 fixtures against Al Nassr. However the club bowed out from the AFC Champions League after a 3–0 defeat on aggregate.

== Honours ==
- Saudi First Division League (tier 2)
  - Winners (1): 2016–17
  - Runners-up (1): 2020–21
- Saudi Second Division League (tier 3)
  - Winners (2): 1984–85, 2013–14
  - Runners-up (1): 2003–04
- King's Cup
  - Winners (1): 2021–22
- Saudi Super Cup
  - Runners-up (1): 2022

== Players ==
As of January 2025

Note: Flags indicate national team as defined under FIFA eligibility rules; some limited exceptions apply. Players may hold more than one non-FIFA nationality.

No.	Pos.	Nation	Player
1	GK	KSA	Abdulraouf Al-Duqayl
2	DF	KSA	Mukhair Al-Rashidi
5	MF	BRA	Hugo Moura
6	MF	KSA	Ali Al-Hussain
7	MF	KSA	Nawaf Al-Harthi
8	MF	KSA	Abdulhadi Al-Harajin
9	FW	KSA	Malek Al-Abdulmenem
10	FW	ZAM	Fashion Sakala
12	DF	KSA	Turki Al-Jaadi (on loan from Al-Taawoun)
13	GK	KSA	Sattam Al-Shammari
14	MF	KSA	Mansor Al-Beshe
15	DF	POR	Paulo Oliveira
17	FW	BRA	Lázaro (on loan from Al-Najma)
20	MF	KSA	Abdullah Al-Qahtani
21	DF	KSA	Ziyad Al-Sahafi
22	DF	KSA	Mohammed Al-Baqawi (captain)
23	MF	ESP	Jason

No.	Pos.	Nation	Player
24	DF	KSA	Ahmed Bamsaud
25	DF	GAM	Omar Colley
27	FW	KSA	Sultan Al-Jabri
29	MF	KSA	Albaraa Adawi
30	MF	GBS	Alfa Semedo
31	GK	KSA	Osama Al-Thumairy
40	MF	BRA	Yago Souza (on loan from América Mineiro)
41	FW	KSA	Ammar Al-Khaibari
42	DF	KSA	Ali Al Harshan
43	MF	KSA	Fahad Al-Hubaishi
44	DF	KSA	Ali Al-Nakhli
47	DF	KSA	Mohammed Al-Dowaish
52	GK	PAN	Orlando Mosquera
55	MF	KSA	Abdullah Al-Anazi
67	MF	KSA	Danyal Al Habib
72	FW	KSA	Mohammed Hakami
77	MF	KSA	Ryan Enad
92	FW	KSA	Moath Al-Habib

== Coaching staff ==
Position	Name
Head coach	(Brazil) Fábio Carille
Assistant coach	(Brazil) Sandro Forner (Brazil) Leandro da Silva (Saudi Arabia) Abdulmajeed Al-Musaymir
Goalkeeping coach	(Spain) Oscar Rodriguez
Fitness coach	(Brazil) Cesar Mendes
Performance development manager	(Brazil) Luiz Paschoalini
Video analyst	(Saudi Arabia) Abdullah Al-Kassar
Performance analyst	(Saudi Arabia) Faris Al-Dowaish
Doctor	(Romania) Marian Dumitru
Physiotherapist	(Romania) Laurentiu Petroiu (Saudi Arabia) Abdullah Al-Jandal
Nutritionist	(Portugal) Gabino Rodrigues
Masseur	(Romania) Andrei Brateanu (Romania) Claudiu Calin
Interpreter	(Saudi Arabia) Souhail Jdidi
Chef	(Saudi Arabia) Kareem Khamis
Sporting director	(Saudi Arabia) Khalid Al-Shammari

== Managerial history ==
- (Tunisia) Zine El Abidine Gritli (1979 – 1982)
- (Tunisia) Reda El Sayeh (1984 – 1987)
- (Tunisia) Youssef Baati (2001 – 2002)
- (Tunisia) Habibe Othmani (August 1, 2002 – November 2, 2002)
- (Tunisia) Hassan Oueslati (November 2, 2002 – May 1, 2003)
- (Tunisia) Rasheed Ben Ammar (August 1, 2003 – June 6, 2004)
- (Brazil) Lula (October 11, 2004 – April 23, 2005)
- (Saudi Arabia) Ali Komaikh (April 23, 2005 – May 18, 2005)
- (Saudi Arabia) Turki Al-Sultan (caretaker) (May 18, 2005 – June 1, 2005)
- (Tunisia) Zouhair Louati (June 25, 2005 – March 10, 2006)
- (Saudi Arabia) Ibrahim Al-Qarmalah (caretaker) (March 10, 2006 – May 1, 2006)
- (Tunisia) Hichem Grioui (July 14, 2006 – November 25, 2006)
- (Saudi Arabia) Ibrahim Al-Qarmalah (caretaker) (November 25, 2006 – December 17, 2006)
- (Tunisia) Zouhair Louati (December 17, 2006 – May 10, 2007)
- (Tunisia) Ghazi Ghrairi (July 30, 2007 – February 19, 2008)
- (Egypt) Bahaaeddine Qebisi (February 19, 2008 – April 27, 2008)
- (Tunisia) Zouhair Ghodbani (April 27, 2008 – April 30, 2008)
- (Saudi Arabia) Hamdan Al-Jara'ah (caretaker) (April 30, 2008 – May 17, 2008)
- (Tunisia) Nasser Nefzi (July 1, 2008 – January 13, 2009)
- (Saudi Arabia) Ibrahim Al-Qarmalah (January 13, 2009 – March 23, 2009)
- (Egypt) Mohammed Farouk (March 23, 2009 – October 18, 2009)
- (Tunisia) Selim Al Manga (October 20, 2009 – May 10, 2010)
- (Tunisia) Yousri bin Kahla (July 1, 2010 – December 5, 2010)
- (Tunisia) Selim bin Gholis (caretaker) (December 5, 2010 – December 11, 2010)
- (Tunisia) Selim Al Manga (December 11, 2010 – May 10, 2011)
- (Egypt) Mohammed Farouk (July 1, 2011 – December 1, 2011)
- (Saudi Arabia) Ibrahim Al-Qarmalah (caretaker) (December 1, 2011 – December 17, 2011)
- (Tunisia) Moncef Mcharek (December 17, 2011 – April 17, 2013)
- (Jordan) Rateb Al-Awadat (April 17, 2013 – August 21, 2013)
- (Tunisia) Makram Abdullah (August 23, 2013 – May 1, 2014)
- (Tunisia) Ahmed Labyad (May 7, 2014 – November 12, 2014)
- (Tunisia) Abderrazek Chebbi (November 13, 2014 – May 1, 2015)
- (Saudi Arabia) Khalil Al-Masri (June 9, 2015 – September 20, 2015)
- (Tunisia) Lassaad Maamar (September 28, 2015 – May 2, 2016)
- (Tunisia) Habib Ben Romdhane (May 2, 2016 – May 10, 2017)
- (Romania) Constantin Gâlcă (May 20, 2017 – November 1, 2017)
- (Argentina) Gustavo Costas (November 1, 2017 – October 15, 2018)
- (Serbia) Slavoljub Muslin (October 15, 2018 – February 2, 2019)
- (Algeria) Noureddine Zekri (February 5, 2019 – May 17, 2019)
- (Portugal) Jorge Simão (June 8, 2019 – August 27, 2020)
- (Saudi Arabia) Yousef Al-Ghadeer (August 27, 2020 – September 10, 2020)
- (Tunisia) Habib Ben Romdhane (September 24, 2020 – June 1, 2021)
- (Serbia) Vuk Rašović (June 21, 2021 – June 1, 2024)
- (Greece) Christos Kontis (July 8, 2024 – December 3, 2024)
- (Greece) Alexandros Tziolis (caretaker) (December 3, 2024 – December 10, 2024)
- (Portugal) Pedro Emanuel (December 10, 2024 – )

== Record in Asian Football ==
- AFC Champions League: 1 participation

Season	Competition	Round	Club	Home	Away	Aggregate
2023–24	Champions League	Group A	(Turkmenistan) Ahal	3–1	0–1	2nd
2023–24	Champions League	Group A	(Uzbekistan) Pakhtakor Tashkent	2–0	4–1	2nd
2023–24	Champions League	Group A	(United Arab Emirates) Al-Ain	2–3	1–4	2nd
2023–24	Champions League	Round of 16	(Saudi Arabia) Al-Nassr	0–1	0–2	0–3

== See also ==
- List of football clubs in Saudi Arabia
