= 2014–15 Tunisian Ligue Professionnelle 1 =

89th season of top-tier football in Tunisia

Tunisian Ligue Professionnelle 1
- Season: 2014–15
- Dates: 13 August 2014 – 2 June 2015
- Champions: Club Africain (13th title)
- Relegated: Union Monastirienne; Avenir de Gabès; Association de Djerba
- Champions League: Club Africain; Étoile du Sahel
- Confederation Cup: Espérance de Tunis; Stade Gabèsien
- Matches: 240
- Goals: 498 (2.08 per match)
- Top goalscorer: Khalifa (15 goals)
- Biggest home win: EST 7–1 ASG
- Biggest away win: EGSG 0–4 CA; ST 0–4 CA
- Highest scoring: EST 7–1 ASG
- Longest winning run: 6 games (CA, ESS)
- Longest unbeaten run: 15 games (CSS)
- Longest winless run: 16 games (USM)
- Longest losing run: 10 games (ASG)

The 2014–15 Tunisian Ligue Professionnelle 1 (Tunisian Professional League) season was the 60th season of top-tier football in Tunisia. The competition began on 13 August 2014 and ended on 2 June 2015. The defending champions from the previous season were Espérance de Tunis.

== Teams ==
A total of 16 teams contested the league, including 13 sides from the 2013–14 season and three promoted from the 2013–14 Tunisian Ligue Professionnelle 2. Association de Djerba was the first to obtain promotion, followed by Avenir de Gabès and finally Espérance de Zarzis one game before the end of the promotion group league. The three teams made their comeback to the Tunisian Ligue Professionnelle 1 after finishing in the 3 first places of the six-team promotion group. On the other hand, Olympique Béja, Palme de Tozeur and Grombalia Sports were the 3 last teams of the 2013–14 season and played in the Tunisian Ligue Professionnelle 2 during the 2014–15 season. Espérance de Tunis were the defending champions from the 2013–14 season.

In the 2014-15 season, Club Africain drew an average home attendance of 12,478 in 15 home games. It was the highest average home attendance in the Tunisian top-flight football league, followed by ES Tunis with 7,365.

=== Stadiums and locations ===
Locations of the 2014–15 Ligue 1 teams

Team	Location	Stadium	Capacity	2013–14 season
Association de Djerba	Djerba	Stade de Houmt Souk	6,000	Ligue 2
Avenir de Gabès	Gabès	Stade Municipal de Gabès	10,000	Ligue 2
Avenir de Marsa	Tunis	Stade Abdelaziz Chtioui	6,000	5th in Ligue 1
Club Africain	Tunis	Stade Olympique de Radès	60,000	4th in Ligue 1
Club Bizertin	Bizerte	Stade 15 Octobre	20,000	6th in Ligue 1
Club de Hammam-Lif	Tunis	Stade Bou Kornine	8,000	11th in Ligue 1
Club Sfaxien	Sfax	Stade Taïeb Mhiri	22,000	2nd in Ligue 1
El Gawafel de Gafsa	Gafsa	Stade Olympique de Gafsa	7,000	12th in Ligue 1
Étoile de Métlaoui	Métlaoui	Stade Municipal de Métlaoui	5,000	9th in Ligue 1
Étoile du Sahel	Sousse	Stade Olympique de Sousse	25,000	3rd in Ligue 1
Espérance de Tunis	Tunis	Stade Olympique de Radès	60,000	Ligue 1 Champions
Espérance de Zarzis	Zarzis	Stade Jlidi	7,000	Ligue 2
Jeunesse Kairouanaise	Kairouan	Stade Ali Zouaoui	15,000	8th in Ligue 1
Stade Gabèsien	Gabès	Stade Municipal de Gabès	10,000	7th in Ligue 1
Stade Tunisien	Tunis	Stade Chedly Zouiten	20,000	13th in Ligue 1
Union Monastirienne	Monastir	Stade Mustapha Ben Jannet	20,000	10th in Ligue 1

== Results ==
=== League table ===
Pos	Team	Pld	W	D	L	GF	GA	GD	Pts	Qualification or relegation
1	Club Africain (C)	30	20	5	5	50	18	+32	65	Qualification to the 2016 CAF Champions League
2	Étoile du Sahel	30	19	7	4	47	17	+30	63 (Note: 1 point was deducted from Étoile du Sahel for refusing to play the Round 20 game against Club de Hammam-Lif.)	Qualification to the 2016 CAF Champions League
3	Espérance de Tunis	30	17	9	4	52	21	+31	60	Qualification to the 2016 CAF Confederation Cup
4	Club Sfaxien	30	11	14	5	35	21	+14	47	
5	Espérance de Zarzis	30	11	12	7	35	25	+10	45	
6	Avenir de Marsa	30	10	13	7	33	37	−4	43 (Note: Avenir de Marsa ahead on head-to-head record: Stade Tunisien 0–0 Avenir de Marsa (week 12), Avenir de Marsa 2–1 Stade Tunisien (week 27) Stade Gabèsien qualified to 2016 CAF Confederation Cup after reaching the 2014–15 Tunisian Cup final against Étoile du Sahel, regardless of the outcome of the game since the latter has already qualified to 2016 CAF Champions League.)	
7	Stade Tunisien	30	12	7	11	29	32	−3	43	
8	Club Bizertin	30	9	14	7	21	21	0	41	
9	Jeunesse Kairouanaise	30	9	11	10	32	33	−1	38	
10	Stade Gabèsien	30	9	10	11	20	28	−8	37	Qualification to the 2016 CAF Confederation Cup
11	Club de Hammam-Lif	30	9	9	12	30	35	−5	36	
12	Étoile de Métlaoui	30	8	8	14	24	40	−16	32	
13	El Gawafel de Gafsa	30	6	12	12	26	39	−13	30	
14	Union Monastirienne (R)	30	3	16	11	20	31	−11	25	Relegation to the 2015–16 Ligue 2
15	Avenir de Gabès (R)	30	5	4	21	21	44	−23	19	Relegation to the 2015–16 Ligue 2
16	Association de Djerba (R)	30	4	5	21	23	56	−33	17	Relegation to the 2015–16 Ligue 2

Source: Ligue 1
Rules for classification: 1) points; 2) goal difference; 3) number of goals scored.
(C) Champions; (R) Relegated

=== Result table ===
Home \ Away	ASD	ASG	ASM	CA	CAB	CSHL	CSS	EGSG	ESM	ESS	EST	ESZ	JSK	SG	ST	USM
Association de Djerba		1–1	2–1	1–2	1–2	1–2	1–2	2–2	1–0	0–0	0–1	2–3	1–2	0–1	1–2	1–2
Avenir de Gabès	0–0		4–0	0–1	0–2	1–2	0–1	1–2	0–1	0–2	2–0	0–0	3–0	0–1	0–3	2–0
Avenir de Marsa	2–1	1–0		1–0	0–0	1–0	2–2	3–2	2–2	1–3	1–0	3–0	1–0	0–0	2–1	1–1
Club Africain	3–1	2–1	3–0		3–0	1–0	1–1	3–0	3–0	1–2	1–0	1–1	1–0	2–0	1–0	2–1
Club Bizertin	2–0	0–0	1–0	2–1		1–1	0–0	0–0	0–0	2–1	1–3	1–3	3–0	0–1	1–0	0–0
CS Hammam-Lif	2–1	2–0	2–2	0–3	1–1		0–0	1–1	1–1	2–0 (Note: Club de Hammam-Lif was awarded a 2–0 win (Round 20) after Étoile du Sahel refused to play the game as a protest following what happened during the Round 19 game against El Gawafel de Gafsa and the goal refused by the referee.)	0–1	0–1	1–2	1–0	1–2	1–1
Club Sfaxien	5–0	2–0	3–0	1–1	0–0	2–1		1–1	0–0	1–1	0–0	2–1	1–1	1–0	2–1	3–1
El Gawafel de Gafsa	0–1	3–0	0–0	0–4	1–2	2–0	1–0		2–2	0–3	0–0	3–1	0–1	0–1	0–0	0–0
Étoile de Métlaoui	3–1	0–1	1–1	0–1	2–0	1–2	1–1	1–2		1–3	0–1	1–0	1–4	2–0	1–0	1–0
Étoile du Sahel	4–1	2–0	2–0	2–0	2–0	2–0	0–0	0–0	3–0		1–1	2–3	2–1	0–0	1–0	3–0
Espérance de Tunis	5–0	7–1	3–1	2–2	1–0	0–1	2–1	4–1	1–0	1–0		2–1	1–0	6–1	4–1	0–0
Espérance de Zarzis	3–0	2–1	1–1	1–2	0–0	2–1	2–0	2–0	0–0	1–1	0–0		0–0	1–1	4–0	0–0
Jeunesse Kairouanaise	3–1	1–1	3–3	0–1	0–0	1–1	0–2	1–0	4–0	0–1	1–1	0–2		2–1	0–0	1–1
Stade Gabèsien	0–1	2–1	0–0	1–0	0–0	1–2	1–0	2–2	3–0	0–1	1–1	1–0	0–0		0–2	0–0
Stade Tunisien	1–0	2–1	0–0	0–4	0–0	1–0	1–0	2–0	2–0	0–1	2–2	0–0	2–2	3–1		1–0
Union Monastirienne	0–0	1–0	1–3	0–0	0–0	2–2	1–1	1–1	1–2	1–2	1–2	0–0	1–2	0–0	3–0	

Source: Ligue 1
Legend: Blue = home team win; Yellow = draw; Red = away team win.
For upcoming matches, an "a" indicates there is an article about the rivalry between the two participants.

== Goalscorers ==
=== Top goalscorers ===
Rank	Player	Club	Goals
1	(Tunisia) Saber Khalifa	Club Africain	15
2	(Algeria) Baghdad Bounedjah	Étoile du Sahel	11
2	(Tunisia) Youssef Mouihbi	Étoile du Sahel	11
4	(Tunisia) Ahmed Akaïchi	Espérance de Tunis	10
5	(Tunisia) Chaker Rguii	Espérance de Zarzis	9
6	(Algeria) Abdelmoumene Djabou	Club Africain	8
6	(Tunisia) Tijani Belaïd	Club Africain	8
8	(Tunisia) Slim Mezlini	Jeunesse Kairouanaise	7
8	(Nigeria) Samuel Eduok	Espérance de Tunis	7

=== All goalscorers ===
15 goals

- (Tunisia) Saber Khalifa

11 goals

- (Algeria) Baghdad Bounedjah
- (Tunisia) Youssef Mouihbi

10 goals

- (Tunisia) Ahmed Akaïchi

9 goals

- (Tunisia) Chaker Rguii

8 goals

- (Algeria) Abdelmoumene Djabou
- (Tunisia) Tijani Belaïd

7 goals

- (Tunisia) Slim Mezlini
- (Nigeria) Samuel Eduok

6 goals

- (Mali) Mohamed Cheikh Touré
- (Benin) Jacques Bessan
- (Burkina Faso) Hugues-Wilfried Dah
- (Cameroon) Yannick N'Djeng
- (Mauritania) Ismail Diakité
- (Tunisia) Hedi Boukhriss
- (Tunisia) Hichem Essifi
- (Tunisia) Slim Jedaïed
- (Tunisia) Mejdi Mosrati
- (Tunisia) Heithem Ben Salem
- (Tunisia) Oussama Darragi
- (Tunisia) Bilel Ben Messaoud
- (Tunisia) Mohamed Amine Aouichaoui

5 goals

- (Tunisia) Zouheir Dhaouadi
- (Tunisia) Fakhreddine Ben Youssef
- (Morocco) Brahim El Bahri
- (Tunisia) Borhene Ghannem
- (Tunisia) Alaeddine Marzouki
- (Tunisia) Maher Hannachi
- (Tunisia) Khaled Yahia
- (Tunisia) Youssef Fouzai
- (Tunisia) Foued Khraïfi
- (Tunisia) Bilel Yaken
- (Tunisia) Zied Ounalli
- (Ghana) Ashante Uriah

4 goals

- (Tunisia) Mohamed Ali Moncer
- (Tunisia) Alaeddine Abbès
- (Tunisia) Mohamed Ali Ben Hammouda
- (Tunisia) Zied Boughattas
- (Tunisia) Karim Aouadhi
- (Ivory Coast) Didier Lebri
- (Tunisia) Edem Rjaïbi
- (Tunisia) Mohamed Aouichi
- (Tunisia) Ahmed Hosni
- (Tunisia) Saad Bguir
- (Tunisia) Salema Kasdaoui
- (Tunisia) Haythem Jouini
- (Tunisia) Amir Omrani

3 goals

- (Tunisia) Imed Meniaoui
- (Cameroon) Didier Talla
- (Tunisia) Ali Maâloul
- (Tunisia) Taha Yassine Khenissi
- (Tunisia) Hamza Hadda
- (Tunisia) Wael Ben Romdhane
- (Senegal) Babacar Ndiour
- (Tunisia) Mehdi Saada
- (Tunisia) Zied Bakouch
- (Tunisia) Younes Mazhoud
- (Tunisia) Rami Bedoui
- (Tunisia) Hassen Harbaoui
- (Tunisia) Skander Cheikh
- (Tunisia) Zouheir Attia
- (Guinea) Alkhali Bangoura
- (Tunisia) Alaya Brigui
- (Tunisia) Malek Landolsi

2 goals

- (Tunisia) Seif Teka
- (Tunisia) Chiheb Zoghlami
- (Ghana) Harrison Afful
- (Tunisia) Yassine Meriah
- (Tunisia) Chamseddine Dhaouadi
- (Tunisia) Slim Mhadhebi
- (Tunisia) Amine Abbes
- (Tunisia) Ali Mchani
- (Senegal) Mathieu Bandiaky
- (Ivory Coast) Junior Karamoko
- (Tunisia) Aymen Ben Amor
- (Tunisia) Elyes Jelassi
- (Tunisia) Maher Ameur
- (Tunisia) Amor Fhal
- (Tunisia) Fakhreddine Galbi
- (Mali) Aboubacar Tambadou
- (France) Mickaël Buscher
- (Tunisia) Wajdi Mejri
- (Tunisia) Najeh Hamadi
- (Tunisia) Larbi Jabeur
- (Tunisia) Boulbaba Ghrab
- (Libya) Ahmed Zuway
- (Tunisia) Akram Ben Sassi
- (Tunisia) Mohamed Abdeddeyem
- (Tunisia) Oussama Abdelkader
- (Tunisia) Fahmi Ben Romdhane
- (Tunisia) Zoubeir Darragi
- (Tunisia) Ahmed Ayadi
- (Tunisia) Idriss Mhirsi
- (Tunisia) Mossaab Sassi
- (Tunisia) Achref Nasri
- (Tunisia) Rochdi Jarbouii
- (Tunisia) Heithem Mhamedi
- (Tunisia) Fehmi Kacem
- (Tunisia) Sofiane Moussa
- (Tunisia) Ghailene Chaalali
- (Tunisia) Mohamed Ali Yacoubi
- (Tunisia) Selim Bacha
- (Tunisia) Charfeddine Belhaj
- (Tunisia) Youssef Trabelsi
- (Tunisia) Bassem Nafti

1 goal

- (Tunisia) Yassin Mikari
- (Tunisia) Hamza Agrebi
- (Tunisia) Stéphane Nater
- (Tunisia) Bilel Ifa
- (Tunisia) Nidhal Said
- (Tunisia) Imed Louati
- (Tunisia) Seifallah Hosni
- (Tunisia) Saïf Ghezal
- (Tunisia) Nabil Missaoui
- (Tunisia) Hamza Zakar
- (Tunisia) Laamari Bargougui
- (Tunisia) Ghazi Chellouf
- (Tunisia) Omar Zekri
- (Tunisia) Zied Ziadi
- (Tunisia) Baligh El Echi
- (Algeria) Kaddour Beldjilali
- (Niger) Mohamed Yakouba
- (Cameroon) Franck Kom
- (Cameroon) Ernest Thierry Anang
- (Nigeria) Onuoha Ogbonna
- (Ivory Coast) Ibrahima Touré
- (Senegal) Youssoupha Mbengue
- (Ivory Coast) Fousseny Coulibaly
- (Brazil) Magno Cruz
- (Ivory Coast) Alex Somian
- (Ivory Coast) Abdul Moustapha Ouédraogo
- (Tunisia) Chedly Ghrab
- (Tunisia) Hachem Abbes
- (Tunisia) Achref Ben Dhiaf
- (Tunisia) Hamdi Rouid
- (Tunisia) Haythem Baghdadi
- (Tunisia) Tarek Chaabouni
- (Tunisia) Amir Ben Mchala
- (Tunisia) Mehdi Ressaïssi
- (Tunisia) Houssine Ben Yahia
- (Tunisia) Mahmoud Dridi
- (Tunisia) Malek Bhar
- (Tunisia) Mohamed Ayed
- (Tunisia) Zied Derbali
- (Tunisia) Mohamed Jemaa Khlif
- (Tunisia) Mahmoud Khemiri
- (Tunisia) Naoufel Youssfi
- (Tunisia) Mohamed Habib Yaken
- (Tunisia) Hamdi Abdi
- (Tunisia) Fedi Hmizi
- (Tunisia) Hocine Ragued
- (Tunisia) Houssem Taboubi
- (Tunisia) Chakib Lachkham
- (Tunisia) Zied Machmoum
- (Tunisia) Heythem Doula
- (Tunisia) Mortadha Baadeche
- (Tunisia) Youssef Khemiri
- (Tunisia) Marouane Tej
- (Tunisia) Marouane Atoui
- (Tunisia) Aymen Derouiche
- (Tunisia) Abdelkader Dhaou
- (Tunisia) Mohamed Houssem Slimène
- (Tunisia) Slimène Kchok
- (Tunisia) Mohamed Ali Ragoubi
- (Tunisia) Yassine Salhi
- (Tunisia) Mohamed Ali Slema
- (Tunisia) Iheb Mbarki
- (Tunisia) Houssem Bnina
- (Tunisia) Mohamed Ali Jouini
- (Tunisia) Rami Bouchniba
- (Tunisia) Omar Saddi
- (Tunisia) Mehdi Ouertani
- (Tunisia) Alaeddine Bouslimi
- (Tunisia) Seifeddine Jerbi
- (Tunisia) Maher Abidi
- (Tunisia) Mohamed Amine Naffati
- (Tunisia) Hamdi Nagguez
- (Tunisia) Wissem Bousnina
- (Tunisia) Mohamed Ali Korbi
- (Tunisia) Houcine Messaadi
- (Tunisia) Anis Farhat
- (Tunisia) Mahmoud Laadhibi
- (Tunisia) Firas Aissaoui
- (Tunisia) Hamza Lahmar

Own goals

- (Algeria) Hicham Belkaroui (Club Africain) against Association de Djerba on 31 August 2014
- (Tunisia) Mohamed Amine Naffati (Club de Hammam-Lif) against Stade Tunisien on 31 August 2014
- (Tunisia) Khalil Hnid (Avenir de Marsa) against Club Africain on 3 October 2014
- (Ivory Coast) Alex Somian (Stade Tunisien) against Club Sfaxien on 28 December 2014
- (Tunisia) Mohamed Ben Ali (Stade Tunisien) against Club Africain on 18 February 2015
- (Tunisia) Mehdi Ben Nsib (Association de Djerba) against Club Sfaxien on 18 February 2015
- (Tunisia) Houssem Bnina (Jeunesse Kairounaise) against Espérance de Zarzis on 28 February 2015

== Attendances ==
#	Football club	Average attendance
1	Club Africain	12,478
2	ES Tunis	7,365
3	CS Sfaxien	6,245
4	US Monastir	4,890
5	ES Sahel	4,236
6	AS Marsa	2,999
7	CA Bizertin	2,319
8	CS Hammam-Lif	1,514
9	AS Gabès	1,239
10	Stade Tunisien	980
11	Stade Gabèsien	738
12	AS Djerba	730
13	ES Metlaoui	748
14	JS Kairouanaise	510
15	EGS Gafsa	500
16	ES Zarzis	485

== See also ==
- 2014–15 Tunisian Ligue Professionnelle 2
- 2014–15 Tunisian Ligue Professionnelle 3
- 2014–15 Tunisian Cup
