= 2014–15 Tunisian Cup =

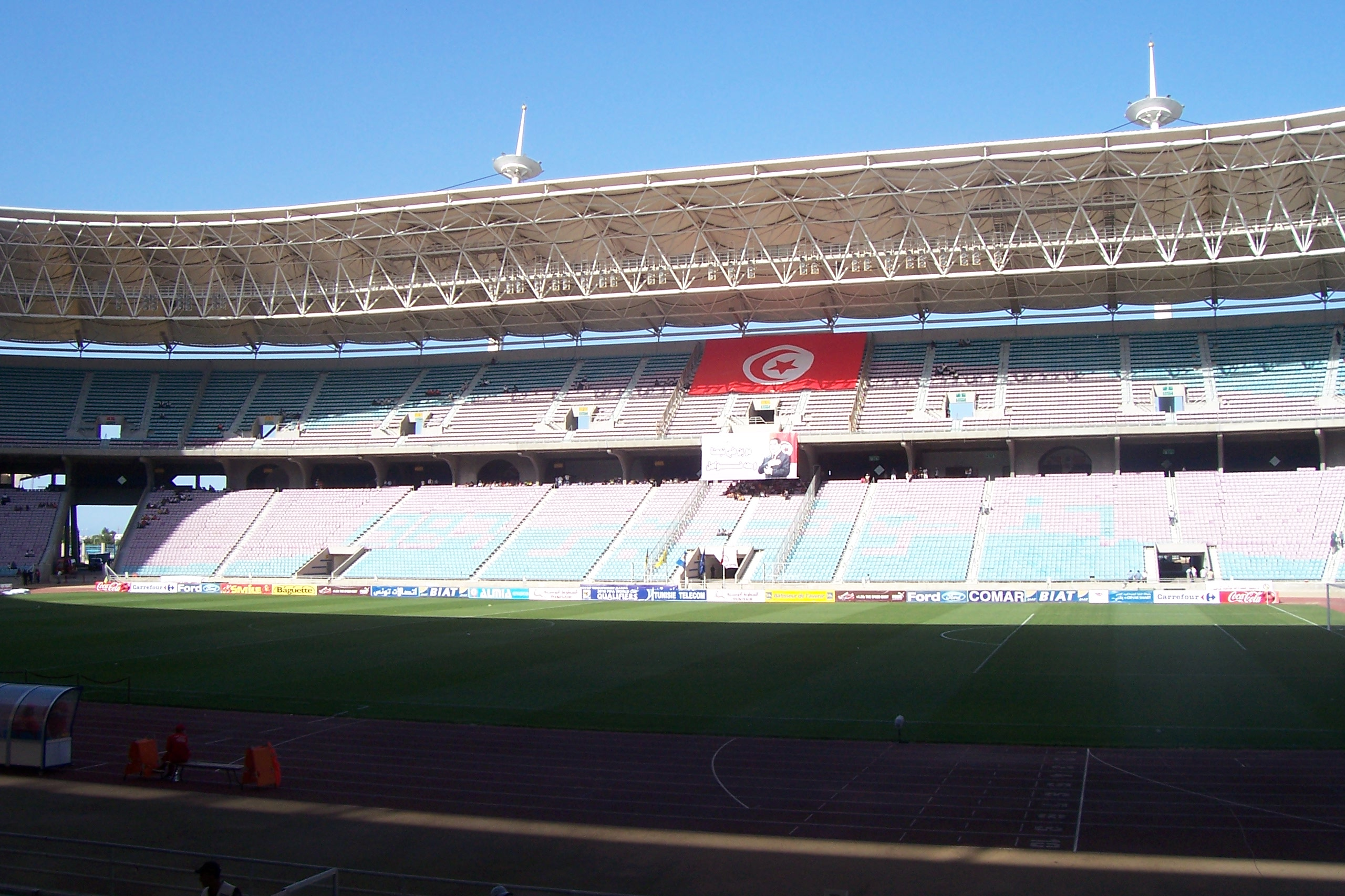
- Stade Olympique de Radès hosted the final

Tournament details
- Country: Tunisia

Final positions
- Champions: Étoile du Sahel
- Runners-up: Stade Gabèsien

The 2014–15 Tunisian Cup (Coupe de Tunisie) was the 83rd season of the football cup competition of Tunisia. The competition was organized by the Fédération Tunisienne de Football (FTF) and open to all clubs in Tunisia.
Ligue 1 teams entered the competition in the Round of 32.

== First round ==
=== Ligue 3 games ===
Only Ligue 3 teams compete in this round.

19 October 2014	Vague de Menzel Abderrahmane	6–1	Éclair Testourien	Stade Hmaied Moujahed, Menzel Abderrahmane

19 October 2014	Mouloudia Manouba	1–0	Avenir de Mohamedia

19 October 2014	Union de Bou Salem	2–1	Étoile de Radès

19 October 2014	Stir Zarzouna	4–1	Association Mégrine

19 October 2014	Club des Cheminots	1–0	Dahmani AC

19 October 2014	Stade Africain Menzel Bourguiba	2–2 (a.e.t.) (1–3 p)	Olympique des Transports	Stade Municipal de Menzel Bourguiba, Menzel Bourguiba

19 October 2014	Jeunesse d'El Omrane	0–0 (a.e.t.) (4–5 p)	Jeunesse de Soukra

19 October 2014	Club Hilalien	0–0 (a.e.t.) (3–5 p)	Club de Makthar

19 October 2014	Étoile de Béni Khalled	1–0	Avenir de Soliman	Stade de Béni Khalled, Béni Khalled

19 October 2014	Réussite de Sbiba	0–0 (a.e.t.) (4–5 p)	Astre de Menzel Ennour

19 October 2014	Espoir de Haffouz	1–0	Étoile du Fahs	Haffouz

19 October 2014	Club de Menzel Bouzelfa	1–0	Al Ahly Hajri

19 October 2014	Océano de Kerkennah	5–3	Progrès de Sakiet Eddaïer	Stade Farhat-Hached de Remla, Kerkennah

19 October 2014	Espoir de Rogba	2–1	Étoile de Feriana

19 October 2014	Espoir de Bouchamma	1–1 (a.e.t.) (4–3 p)	Croissant de Redeyef

=== Ligue 2 games ===
Only Ligue 2 teams compete in this round.

8 November 2014	Club de Korba	2–0	Jendouba Sport	Stade Municipal de Korba, Korba

8 November 2014	Union de Sbeitla	1–0	Association d'Ariana	Stade de Sbeitla, Sbeitla

8 November 2014	Grombalia Sports	1–0 (a.e.t.)	Enfidha Sports	Stade de Grombalia, Grombalia

8 November 2014	El Makarem de Mahdia	1–2	Espoir de Hammam Sousse	Stade Rached Khouja, Mahdia

8 November 2014	Olympique Sidi Bouzid	2–1	Sfax Railways Sports

8 November 2014	Sporting Ben Arous	3–0	Olympique Béja

9 November 2014	FC Hammamet	0–1	Union de Ben Guerdane	Stade Municipal de Hammamet, Hammamet

9 November 2014	Avenir de Kasserine	3–1	Stade Sfaxien	Stade de Kasserine, Kasserine

9 November 2014	Olympique du Kef	5–2	Croissant de M'saken	Stade du Kef, El Kef

9 November 2014	Palme de Tozeur	awarded*	Avenir d'Oued Ellil	Stade de Tozeur, Tozeur

*The game was canceled and the qualification to the next round was awarded to Avenir d'Oued Ellil.

== Second round ==
17 December 2014	Union de Siliana	1–0	Lessouda Sports

17 December 2014	Union de Bou Salem	1–0	Croissant d'Akouda

17 December 2014	Espoir de Bouchamma	2–2 (a.e.t.) (2–4 p)	Avenir de Soukra

17 December 2014	Jeunesse de Soukra	2–1	Espoir de Haffouz

17 December 2014	Flèche de Ras Jebel	1–1 (a.e.t.) (3–1 p)	Relais de Bir Bouregba

17 December 2014	Club de Makthar	2–1	Espoir de Bouficha

17 December 2014	Kalâa Sport	3–1	Astre de Menzel Ennour

17 December 2014	Flèche de Ksar Gafsa	4–0	El Alia Sports

17 December 2014	Olympique des Transports	2–1	Stade Gafsien

17 December 2014	Club de Menzel Bouzelfa	awarded*	Club Neftien

17 December 2014	Étoile de Beni Khalled	2–0	Océano de Kerkennah

17 December 2014	Al Ahly Sfaxien	3–1	Avenir de Rejiche

17 December 2014	Stir Zarzouna	1–0	Avenir de Hassi Amor

17 December 2014	Stade de Meknassy	1–0	Avenir de Degache

17 December 2014	Olympique Médenine	3–2	Oasis de Kébili

17 December 2014	Union de Sidi Ameur	awarded*	Union d'Ajim Djerba

17 December 2014	Oasis de Chenini	1–0	Club de Hajeb El Ayoun

17 December 2014	Vague Menzel Abderrahmane	2–0	Association de Ghardimaou

17 December 2014	Hirondelle de Kalâa Kebira	1–0	Mouloudia Manouba

17 December 2014	Espoir de Rogba	2–0	Croissant Chebbien

17 December 2014	Club des Cheminots	3–1	Sporting Moknine

24 December 2014	Wydad Sers	2–1 (a.e.t.)	Jeunesse de Tebourba

*Club Neftien and Union d'Ajim Djerba withdrew

== Third round ==
The 16 winners of this round advanced to the Round of 32, in which the 16 teams of 2014–15 Ligue 1 joined the competition.

14 January 2015	Union de Siliana	0–1	Étoile de Béni Khalled

14 January 2015	Union de Bou Salem	awarded*	Oasis de Chenini

14 January 2015	Stir Zarzouna	1–2	Grombalia Sports

14 January 2015	Club des Cheminots	1–0	Espoir de Rogba

14 January 2015	Olympique du Kef	1–0	Olympique des Transports

14 January 2015	Avenir de Soukra	1–2	Avenir d'Oued Ellil

14 January 2015	Flèche de Ras Jebel	1–1 (a.e.t.) (4–2 p)	Al Ahly Sfaxien

14 January 2015	Club de Makthar	1–0	Stade de Meknassy

14 January 2015	Flèche de Ksar Gafsa	1–0	Union de Sidi Ameur

14 January 2015	Kalâa Sport	3–2	Sporting Ben Arous

14 January 2015	Club de Korba	0–2	Club de Menzel Bouzelfa

14 January 2015	Olympique Médenine	0–1	Union de Ben Guerdane

15 January 2015	Vague de Menzel Abderrahmane	0–1	Espoir de Hammam Sousse

15 January 2015	Jeunesse de Soukra	2–1	Wydad Sers

21 January 2015	Union de Sbeitla	0–1	Hirondelle de Kalâa Kebira

21 January 2015	Avenir de Kasserine	2–0	Olympique Sidi Bouzid

*Oasis de Chenini withdrew.

== Round of 32 ==
In this round, Ligue 1 teams enter the competition.

Union de Bou Salem	awarded*	Espérance de Zarzis

21 February 2015	Jeunesse de Soukra	1–0	Étoile de Béni Khalled	Stade Borj Louzir, La Soukra
14:00	Slim Ben Rebah 83'

21 February 2015	Kalâa Sport	1–1 (a.e.t.) (4–3 p)	Grombalia Sports
14:00	Aymen Zine 49'		33' Radhouene Chabchoub
	Penalties
	Houssem Rouatbi (penalty scored); Mohamed Ali Borobba (penalty scored); Aymen Zine (penalty scored); Amine Touati (penalty scored)		(penalty scored) Marouane Ben Amor; (penalty missed) Houssem Mannaï; (penalty scored) Hamadi Hamadi; (penalty scored) Haythem Mhamedi; (penalty missed) Bilel Riahi

21 February 2015	Club de Menzel Bouzelfa	1–3	Espérance de Tunis	Stade Chedli Zouiten
14:00	Anis Rehaimi 89'		45', 90' Ahmed Akaïchi; 61' Moez Abboud

22 February 2015	Étoile de Métlaoui	0–1	Club Africain	Stade Municipal de Métlaoui
14:00			74' Seif Teka

22 February 2015	Stade Gabèsien	4–1	Union Monastirienne	Stade Municipal de Gabès
14:00	Aliou Cissé 35'; Youssef Fouzai 65'; Keita 79'; Moez Aloulou 86'		44' Naoufel Youssfi

22 February 2015	Avenir d'Oued Ellil	0–0 (a.e.t.) (1-4 p)	Avenir de Marsa
14:00
	Penalties
	Anouar Ch'hibi (penalty scored); Mahmoud Bouabdallah (penalty missed); Maher Hammami (penalty missed)		(penalty scored) Mohamed Ali Ben Hamouda; (penalty scored) Amir Omrani; (penalty scored) Khaled Yahia; (penalty scored) Bilel Ben Messaoud

22 February 2015	Club de Makthar	0–1	Club de Hammam-Lif
14:00			29' Salema Kasdaoui

22 February 2015	Flèche de Ksar Gafsa	0–5	Étoile du Sahel
14:00			2' Ammar Jemal; 4' Alkhali Bangoura; 6' Baghdad Bounedjah; 51' Sofiane Moussa; 76' Aymen Souda

22 February 2015	Union de Ben Guerdane	1–2	Club Sfaxien	Stade de Ben Guerdane, Ben Guerdane
14:00	Achref Zouaghi 20'		34', 63' Brahim El Bahri

22 February 2015	Club des Cheminots	2–2 (a.e.t.) (1–3 p)	Association de Djerba	Stade de Mégrine Erriadh, Mégrine
14:00	Lotfi Msallmi 45'; Amenallah Safdi 115'		40' Mohamed Ayed Abdeddayem; 100' Koutaib Yaakoubi

22 February 2015	Espoir de Hammam Sousse	0–1 (a.e.t.)	Club Bizertin	Stade Municipal Bou Ali-Lahouar, Hammam Sousse
14:00			109' Bilel Saidani

22 February 2015	Hirondelle de Kalâa Kebira	1–2	Stade Tunisien
14:00	Houcine Fersi 92'		61', 78' Elyès Jlassi

22 February 2015	Olympique du Kef	1–2	Jeunesse Kairouanaise	Stade du Kef, El Kef
14:00	Anis Gharbi 12'		75' Slim Dammak; 79' Hichem Essifi

22 February 2015	El Gawafel de Gafsa	2–4 (a.e.t.)	Avenir de Kasserine	Stade de Gafsa, Gafsa
14:00	Skander Cheikh 25'; Amine Abbès 60'		14', 65', 94' Slim Zakkar; 96' Sami Laâroussi

22 February 2015	Flèche de Ras Jebel	0–3	Avenir de Gabès
14:00			45' Mohamed Amine Yaakoubi; 57', 70' Mohamed Cheikh Touré

*Union de Bou Salem withdrew on 20 February.

== Round of 16 ==
The draw was held on 19 April 2015.
The draw also determined the games of the quarter-finals and those of the semi-finals.

4 August 2015	Club Sfaxien	3–2	Club Bizertin	Stade Taïeb Mhiri, Sfax
18:00	Mohamed Ali Moncer 45+1', 90+3'; Hassene Harbaoui 72'		11' Chedly Ghrab; 76' (pen.) Hamza Mathlouthi

4 August 2015	Étoile du Sahel	1–0	Club Africain	Stade Olympique de Sousse, Sousse
18:00	Baghdad Bounedjah 65'

5 August 2015	Kalâa Sport	1–2	Association de Djerba
16:00	Mohamed Ali Borobba 90' (pen.)		55', 82' Nader Benzarti

5 August 2015	Stade Gabèsien	awarded*	Avenir de Gabès	Stade Municipal de Gabès
16:00

5 August 2015	Club de Hammam-Lif	0–0 (a.e.t.) (3–0 p)	Avenir de Marsa	Stade Bou Kornine, Tunis
16:00
	Penalties
	Fahmi Ben Romdhane (penalty scored); Mahmoud Laadhibi (penalty scored); Mehdi Ressaissi (penalty scored)		(penalty missed) Nour Hadhria; (penalty missed) Nizar Amri; (penalty missed) Bilel Ben Messaoud

5 August 2015	Jeunesse de Soukra	0–1	Espérance de Tunis	Stade Borj Louzir, La Soukra
16:00			88' Fakhreddine Ben Youssef

5 August 2015	Jeunesse Kairouanaise	1–1 (a.e.t.) (7-8 p)	Stade Tunisien	Stade Ali Zouaoui, Kairouan
16:00	Wael Chehaibi 45+2'		85' Malek Landolsi
	Penalties
	Haithem Ayouni (penalty scored); Slim Mhadhebi (penalty scored); Mohamed Ali Ragoubi (penalty missed); Houssem Bnina (penalty scored); Sabri Ameri (penalty scored); Slim Zakar (penalty scored); Bangali Keïta (penalty scored); Abderrahim Jeliti (penalty scored); Alkhaly Traoré (penalty missed)		(penalty scored) Seifeddine Jerbi; (penalty scored) Houcine Ben Yahia; (penalty missed) Martial Yao; (penalty scored) Alaeddine Marzouki; (penalty scored) Malek Landolsi; (penalty scored) Mohamed Salah M'hadhebi; (penalty scored) Chiheb Ouni; (penalty scored) Seifeddine Akremi; (penalty scored) Jasser Khemiri

5 August 2015	Avenir de Kasserine	awarded*	Espérance de Zarzis	Stade de Kasserine, Kasserine
16:00

*Avenir de Gabès withdrew on 1 August, and AS Kasserine on 3 August

== Quarter-finals ==
15 August 2015	Association de Djerba	1–3	Stade Gabèsien	Stade de Houmt Souk, Djerba
16:00	Baligh Euchi 89'		51' (pen.) Youcef Fouzai; 56', 63' Hichem Essifi

15 August 2015	Stade Tunisien	1–2 (a.e.t.)	Espérance de Zarzis	Stade Chedli Zouiten, Tunis
18:00	Alaeddine Marzouki 26'		19' (pen.) Hamza Messaadi; 107' Slim Ben Belgacem

16 August 2015	Club de Hammam-Lif	2–1 (a.e.t.)	Espérance de Tunis	Stade Bou Kornine, Tunis
16:00	Fares Meskini 88'; Khaled Melliti 91'		11' Emem Eduok

16 August 2015	Club Sfaxien	1–2	Étoile du Sahel	Stade Taïeb Mhiri, Sfax
18:00	Hassene Harbaoui 59'		78' Diogo; 81' Iheb Msakni

== Semi-finals ==
26 August 2015	Espérance de Zarzis	1–4	Étoile du Sahel	Stade Jlidi, Zarzis
16:00	Emmanuel Gomis 64'		10' Hamdi Nagguez; 57', 79' Alkhali Bangoura; 84' Baghdad Bounedjah

26 August 2015	Stade Gabèsien	2–1	Club de Hammam-Lif	Stade Municipal de Gabès, Gabès
16:00	Ali Hammami 42' (pen.); Hichem Essifi 72'		56' Khaled Melliti

== Final ==
29 August 2015	Stade Gabèsien	3–4	Étoile du Sahel	Stade Olympique de Radès, Tunis
15:00	Hichem Essifi 3'; Ahmed Hosni 24'; Saad Bguir 61'		38' Alkhali Bangoura; 42', 66', 74' Baghdad Bounedjah	Referee: Amine Loussaief

== See also ==
- 2014–15 Tunisian Ligue Professionnelle 1
- 2014–15 Tunisian Ligue Professionnelle 2
