= Hedi =

Hedi may refer to:

== Geography ==
- Hedi language Afro-Asiatic language of Cameroon and Nigeria
- Hedi List of prisons in Shanxi province
- Hedi List of township-level divisions of Zhejiang

== Other ==
- Hedi (film)
- Hédi (given name), list of people with the given name
- Healthcare Effectiveness Data and Information Set (redirect from HEDIS)
- Hedi, an economic policy of ancient China.
