= 2018–19 Al-Fayha FC season =

Al-Fayha
2018–19 season
- Chairman: Saud Al-Shalhoub
- Manager: Gustavo Costas (until 15 October); Slavoljub Muslin (from 15 October until 2 February); Noureddine Zekri (from 5 February)
- Stadium: King Salman Sport City Stadium
- Pro League: 12th
- King Cup: Round of 16 (knocked out by Al-Nassr)
- Top goalscorer: League: Danilo Asprilla (15 goals); All: Danilo Asprilla (15 goals)
- Highest home attendance: 4,307 vs Al-Nassr (26 October 2018)
- Lowest home attendance: 732 vs Ohod (22 December 2018)
- Average home league attendance: 1,896
Home colours	Away colours	Third colours
- All statistics correct as of 16 May 2019.

The 2018–19 season was Al-Fayha's 65th year in existence and second season in the Pro League. This season Al-Fayha participated in the Pro League and King Cup.

The season covers the period from 1 July 2018 to 30 June 2019.

== Players ==
=== Current squad ===
As of 31 August 2018

Note: Flags indicate national team as defined under FIFA eligibility rules; some limited exceptions apply. Players may hold more than one non-FIFA nationality.

No.	Pos.	Nation	Player
1	GK	KSA	Moslem Al Freej
2	DF	KSA	Omar Al-Owdah (on loan from Al-Hilal)
3	DF	KSA	Omar Al-Muziel (on loan from Al-Ittihad)
4	DF	KSA	Sami Al-Khaibari (captain)
5	MF	GRE	Alexandros Tziolis
6	MF	KSA	Dhaifallah Al-Qarni
10	MF	KSA	Abdullah Al-Mutairi
13	DF	KSA	Naif Kariri (on loan from Al-Hilal)
14	DF	CPV	Gegé
15	MF	KSA	Majed Al-Najrani (on loan from Al-Hilal)
16	MF	KSA	Abdulrahman Al-Barakah
17	MF	KSA	Abdulkareem Al-Qahtani
18	MF	KSA	Hassan Jaafari
19	DF	KSA	Mohammed Qassem (on loan from Al-Ittihad)
22	GK	KSA	Fahad Al-Shammari
24	DF	KSA	Ahmed Bamsaud
25	MF	KSA	Tawfiq Buhimed
26	DF	KSA	Abdullah Al-Saleem

No.	Pos.	Nation	Player
27	DF	KSA	Abdullah Kanno
28	MF	KSA	Mohanad Fallatah (on loan from Al-Hilal)
29	MF	SWE	Nahir Besara
32	GK	KSA	Hamad Hawsawi
33	FW	TUN	Amine Chermiti
40	MF	KSA	Hussain Al Hajoj (on loan from Al-Ittihad)
43	DF	KSA	Hassan Al Wathila
50	MF	KSA	Ahmed Abo Ardhen
55	DF	KSA	Nawaf Al-Sobhi
66	DF	TUN	Rami Bedoui (on loan from Étoile du Sahel)
70	MF	COL	Danilo Asprilla (on loan from Al-Ain)
76	FW	KSA	Abdulmohsen Al-Majid
78	MF	KSA	Raed Al-Bashr
80	DF	KSA	Mukhair Al-Rashidi
88	FW	KSA	Mishari Al-Harbi
90	FW	KSA	Nayef Abdali
95	FW	BRA	Iury (on loan from Al-Nasr)
99	GK	JOR	Amer Shafi

=== Out on loan ===
Note: Flags indicate national team as defined under FIFA eligibility rules; some limited exceptions apply. Players may hold more than one non-FIFA nationality.

No.	Pos.	Nation	Player
9	FW	CHI	Ronnie Fernández (at Al-Nasr until 30 June 2019)
11	MF	KSA	Abdullah Al Salem (at Al-Nassr until 30 June 2019)
44	DF	KSA	Hatem Belal (at Al-Qadsiah until 30 June 2019)
77	FW	KSA	Mutaeb Al-Najrani (at Al-Kawkab until 30 June 2019)
—	DF	KSA	Abdulaziz Al-Mansor (at Al-Kawkab until 30 June 2019)

No.	Pos.	Nation	Player
—	DF	KSA	Radhi Al-Mutairi (at Al-Kawkab until 30 June 2019)
—	DF	KSA	Abdulaziz Majrashi (at Al-Kawkab until 30 June 2019)
—	MF	KSA	Talal Majrashi (at Al-Ain until 30 June 2019)
—	MF	KSA	Moataz Tombakti (at Ohod until 30 June 2019)

== Transfers ==
=== In ===
Date	Pos.	Name	Previous club	Fee	Source
3 June 2018	DF	(Saudi Arabia) Ahmed Bamsaud	(Saudi Arabia) Al-Hilal	Free	
8 June 2018	GK	(Colombia) Cristian Bonilla	(Colombia) Atlético Nacional	Free	
28 June 2018	FW	(Saudi Arabia) Mutaeb Al-Najrani	(Saudi Arabia) Al-Khaleej	Free	
21 July 2018	MF	(Brazil) Naldo	(Brazil) Ceará	Undisclosed	
5 January 2019	MF	(Ghana) Seidu Yahaya	(Belarus) Dinamo Minsk	Free	
25 January 2019	GK	(Jordan) Amer Shafi	(Jordan) Shabab Al-Ordon	Undisclosed	
25 January 2019	MF	(Sweden) Nahir Besara	(Sweden) Örebro	Free	
3 February 2019	FW	(Tunisia) Amine Chermiti	(Tunisia) ES Sahel	Undisclosed	

=== Loans in ===
Date	Pos.	Name	Parent club	End date	Source
7 August 2018	DF	(Saudi Arabia) Naif Kariri	(Saudi Arabia) Al-Hilal	End of season	
7 August 2018	FW	(Saudi Arabia) Abdulrahman Al-Yami	(Saudi Arabia) Al-Hilal	23 January 2019	
23 August 2018	DF	(Saudi Arabia) Omar Al-Owdah	(Saudi Arabia) Al-Hilal	End of season	
23 August 2018	MF	(Saudi Arabia) Majed Al-Najrani	(Saudi Arabia) Al-Hilal	End of season	
1 January 2019	DF	(Tunisia) Rami Bedoui	(Tunisia) Étoile du Sahel	End of season	
18 January 2019	FW	(Brazil) Iury	(United Arab Emirates) Al-Nasr	End of season	
22 January 2019	MF	(Saudi Arabia) Mohanad Fallatah	(Saudi Arabia) Al-Hilal	End of season	
23 January 2019	DF	(Saudi Arabia) Omar Al-Muziel	(Saudi Arabia) Al-Ittihad	End of season	
23 January 2019	DF	(Saudi Arabia) Mohammed Qassem	(Saudi Arabia) Al-Ittihad	End of season	
4 February 2019	MF	(Saudi Arabia) Hussain Al Hajoj	(Saudi Arabia) Al-Ittihad	End of season	

=== Out ===
Date	Pos.	Name	New club	Fee	Source
1 May 2018	DF	(Saudi Arabia) Mohammed Al-Baqawi	(Saudi Arabia) Al-Hilal	End of loan	
1 May 2018	MF	(Saudi Arabia) Ahmed Al-Zain	(Saudi Arabia) Al-Ahli	End of loan	
1 May 2018	MF	(Saudi Arabia) Abdulaziz Majrashi	(Saudi Arabia) Al-Ettifaq	End of loan	
1 May 2018	FW	(Saudi Arabia) Fahad Al-Johani	(Saudi Arabia) Al-Qadsiah	End of loan	
9 June 2018	DF	(Saudi Arabia) Hassan Muath	(Saudi Arabia) Al-Ittihad	Free	
25 June 2018	GK	(Saudi Arabia) Abdulrahman Dagriri	(Saudi Arabia) Al-Hazem	Undisclosed	
26 July 2018	MF	(Saudi Arabia) Abdulelah Al-Fahad	(Saudi Arabia) Al-Shoulla	Free	
30 July 2018	MF	(Saudi Arabia) Abdulmajeed Al-Ruwaili	(Saudi Arabia) Al-Orobah	Free	
10 August 2018	DF	(Honduras) Emilio Izaguirre	(Scotland) Celtic	Free	
12 January 2019	MF	(Costa Rica) John Jairo Ruiz	Unattached	Released	
12 March 2019	MF	(Brazil) Naldo	(Brazil) CSA	Released	

=== Loans out ===
Date	Pos.	Name	Subsequent club	End date	Source
31 May 2018	DF	(Saudi Arabia) Abdulaziz Al-Mansor	(Saudi Arabia) Al-Kawkab	End of season	
7 June 2018	MF	(Saudi Arabia) Talal Majrashi	(Saudi Arabia) Ohod	11 December 2018	
16 July 2018	DF	(Saudi Arabia) Radhi Al-Mutairi	(Saudi Arabia) Al-Kawkab	End of season	
17 July 2018	MF	(Saudi Arabia) Moataz Tombakti	(Saudi Arabia) Ohod	End of season	
29 July 2018	DF	(Saudi Arabia) Ahmed Andejani	(Saudi Arabia) Abha	End of season	
23 August 2018	DF	(Saudi Arabia) Abdulaziz Majrashi	(Saudi Arabia) Al-Kawkab	End of season	
23 August 2018	FW	(Saudi Arabia) Mutaeb Al-Najrani	(Saudi Arabia) Al-Kawkab	End of season	
30 December 2018	MF	(Saudi Arabia) Talal Majrashi	(Saudi Arabia) Al-Ain	End of season	
12 January 2019	FW	(Chile) Ronnie Fernández	(United Arab Emirates) Al-Nasr	End of season	
3 February 2019	MF	(Saudi Arabia) Abdullah Al Salem	(Saudi Arabia) Al-Nassr	End of season	

== Pre-season friendlies ==
1 August 2018 Friendly	Al-Fayha (Saudi Arabia)	2–1	(Australia) Newcastle Jets	San Pedro del Pinatar, Spain
19:00 CEST	Asprilla 6'; Ruiz 66'	Report	Jackson 75'	Stadium: Pinatar Arena Football Centre

4 August 2018 Friendly	Al-Fayha (Saudi Arabia)	1–2	(Spain) AFE	San Pedro del Pinatar, Spain
10:00 CEST	Asprilla 80'	Report	Jiménez 43'; Cruz 90'	Stadium: Pinatar Arena Football Centre

7 August 2018 Friendly	Al-Fayha (Saudi Arabia)	1–1	(Spain) Real Murcia	San Pedro del Pinatar, Spain
19:00 CEST	Asprilla 78'	Report	Curto 52'	Stadium: Pinatar Arena Football Centre

10 August 2018 Friendly	Al-Fayha (Saudi Arabia)	3–2	(Spain) Cartagena	San Pedro del Pinatar, Spain
19:00 CEST	Buhimed 67'; Naldo 76'; Asprilla 80', (red card) 85'	Report	Aketxe 32', 57'	Stadium: Pinatar Arena Football Centre

15 August 2018 Friendly	Al-Fayha (Saudi Arabia)	2–2	(Spain) Jumilla	San Pedro del Pinatar, Spain
19:00 CEST	Naldo 32', 64'	Report	Álvarez 55'; Leak 75'	Stadium: Pinatar Arena Football Centre

18 August 2018 Friendly	Al-Fayha (Saudi Arabia)	0–1	(Spain) UCAM Murcia	San Pedro del Pinatar, Spain
19:00 CEST		Report	Hernando 29'	Stadium: Pinatar Arena Football Centre

== Competitions ==
=== Pro League ===
==== League table ====
Pos	Team	Pld	W	D	L	GF	GA	GD	Pts	Qualification or relegation
10	Al-Ittihad	30	9	7	14	44	45	−1	34	Qualification for Arab Club Champions Cup
11	Al-Ettifaq	30	8	9	13	40	55	−15	33	
12	Al-Fayha	30	9	5	16	36	52	−16	32	
13	Al-Hazem (O)	30	7	10	13	33	50	−17	31	Qualification for Relegation play-offs
14	Al-Qadsiah (R)	30	8	4	18	34	51	−17	28	Relegation to Prince Mohammad bin Salman League

Source: spl.com
Rules for classification: 1) Points; 2) Head-to-head points; 3) Head-to-head goal difference; 4) Total goal difference; 5) Total goals scored; 6) Play-off (only for deciding champion, relegation and AFC competitions participation).
(O) Play-off winners; (R) Relegated

==== Results summary ====
Overall								Home						Away					
Pld	W	D	L	GF	GA	GD	Pts	W	D	L	GF	GA	GD	W	D	L	GF	GA	GD
30	9	5	16	36	52	−16	32	6	3	6	27	29	−2	3	2	10	9	23	−14

Last updated: 16 May 2019.
Source: Competitive matches

==== Results by round ====
Round	1	2	3	4	5	6	7	8	9	10	11	12	13	14	15	16	17	18	19	20	21	22	23	24	25	26	27	28	29	30
Ground	A	H	A	H	H	A	H	A	H	H	A	A	A	H	A	A	H	A	H	H	A	A	A	H	H	H	A	H	A	H
Result	L	L	L	W	L	L	D	W	W	D	D	L	L	W	L	L	L	L	D	L	L	W	L	L	W	W	W	L	D	W
Position	16	14	16	12	14	14	13	12	10	10	10	12	13	11	12	13	14	14	14	14	14	13	15	15	14	14	13	13	13	12

Updated to match(es) played on 16 May 2019. Source: Competitive matches
A = Away; H = Home; W = Win; D = Draw; L = Loss

==== Matches ====
All times are local, AST (UTC+3).

Win Draw Loss Postponed

31 August 2018 1	Al-Hilal	1–0	Al-Fayha	Riyadh
18:55	S.Al-Dawsari (yellow card) 28' (yellow-red card); Al Bulaihi (yellow card) 39'; Kanno 77' (pen.); Al-Breik (yellow card) 79'; N.Al-Dawsari (yellow card) 83'	Report	Asprilla (yellow card) 21'; Al-Owda (yellow card) 49' (yellow-red card); Kanno (yellow card) 73' (yellow-red card)	Stadium: King Saud University Stadium; Attendance: 22,076; Referee: Szymon Marciniak (Poland)

14 September 2018 2	Al-Fayha	1–3	Al-Shabab	Al-Majma'ah
18:45	Găman 47' (o.g.); Al-Barakah (yellow card) 75'; Al-Sobhi (yellow card) 78'	Report	Al-Khaibari (yellow card) 58'; Arthur 60'; Benlamri (yellow card) 70'; Ben Mustapha (yellow card) 71'; Budescu 79'; Luiz Antônio (yellow card) 90+5'; Al-Shamrani 90+6'	Stadium: King Salman Sport City Stadium; Attendance: 1,502; Referee: Ovidiu Hațegan (Romania)

21 September 2018 3	Al-Ettifaq	3–0	Al-Fayha	Dammam
18:15	Guanca 33', 90+5', 90+7'; Kiss (yellow card) 51'; Ben Youssef (yellow card) 56'; Arias (yellow card) 58'; El Sayed (yellow card) 85'; Alemán (yellow card) 90+2'; Hazazi (yellow card) 90+4'	Report	Al-Khaibari (yellow card) 31' (yellow-red card) 61'; Kanno (yellow card) 36'; Ruiz (yellow card) 44'; Buhimed (yellow card) 64' (yellow-red card) 90+3'; Fernández (yellow card) 68'	Stadium: Prince Mohamed bin Fahd Stadium; Attendance: 3,123; Referee: Pavel Královec (Czech Republic)

28 September 2018 4	Al-Fayha	4–2	Al-Qadsiah	Al-Majma'ah
18:30	Fernández 10'; Al Salem 52', 58'; Ba Masoud (yellow card) 59'; Asprilla 90+1'	Report	Al-Amri 19', (yellow card) 72'; Yago (yellow card) 23'; Élton 46'	Stadium: King Salman Sport City Stadium; Attendance: 3,020; Referee: Szymon Marciniak (Poland)

4 October 2018 5	Al-Fayha	0–3	Al-Raed	Al-Majma'ah
18:20	Kariri (yellow card) 7'; Asprilla (yellow card) 20'; Gómez (yellow card) 36' (yellow-red card) 71'	Report	Al-Shehri 10', 28'; Hammoudan 58'; Al-Amri (yellow card) 69'	Stadium: King Salman Sport City Stadium; Attendance: 2,106; Referee: Szymon Marciniak (Poland)

18 October 2018 6	Al-Wehda	2–1	Al-Fayha	Mecca
18:35	Al-Malki (yellow card) 15'; Otero 58', (yellow card) 90+1'; Fernandão (yellow card) 74'; Buhimed 86' (o.g.)	Report	Tziolis (yellow card) 39'; Kanno (yellow card) 74'; Hawsawi 77' (o.g.)	Stadium: King Abdul Aziz Stadium; Attendance: 5,391; Referee: Danny Makkelie (Netherlands)

26 October 2018 7	Al-Fayha	1–1	Al-Nassr	Al-Majma'ah
19:45	Asprilla 58'; Ba Masoud (yellow card) 62'; Buhimed (yellow card) 89'	Report	Amrabat 15'; Al-Ghanam (yellow card) 41'	Stadium: King Salman Sport City Stadium; Attendance: 4,307; Referee: Milorad Mažić (Serbia)

1 November 2018 8	Al-Fateh	1–2	Al-Fayha	Al-Hasa
17:35	Al-Juahaim (yellow card) 33'; Chenihi 75'	Report	Tziolis (yellow card) 16'; Asprilla 70'; Fernández 90+4'	Stadium: Prince Abdullah bin Jalawi Stadium; Attendance: 2,512; Referee: Jeroen Manschot (Netherlands)

10 November 2018 9	Al-Fayha	2–1	Al-Ittihad	Al-Majma'ah
17:50	Asprilla 16'; Tziolis (yellow card) 53', (goal) 59'; Bonilla (yellow card) 82'	Report	Muath (yellow card) 21'; Romarinho 23'; Jonas (yellow card) 69'; El Ahmadi (yellow card) 90+6'	Stadium: King Salman Sport City Stadium; Attendance: 2,156; Referee: Matthew Conger (New Zealand)

22 November 2018 10	Al-Fayha	1–1	Al-Hazem	Al Majma'ah
17:50	Fernández 8' (pen.); Al-Sobhi (yellow card) 43'; Buhimed (yellow card) 58'	Report	Al-Saiari (yellow card) 43'; Rodolfo 62'	Stadium: King Salman Sport City Stadium; Attendance: 1,056; Referee: Damir Skomina (Slovenia)

30 November 2018 11	Al-Ahli	1–1	Al-Fayha	Jeddah
18:30	Al Somah 69'	Report	Al-Barakah (yellow card) 21'; Gómez 90+2'	Stadium: King Abdullah Sports City; Attendance: 15,969; Referee: Damir Skomina (Slovenia)

6 December 2018 12	Al-Batin	1–0	Al-Fayha	Hafar al-Batin
15:00	Al-Johani (yellow card) 41', (goal) 50'; Waqes (yellow card) 67'; Facchini (yellow card) 69'; Al-Hammad (yellow card) 90+5'	Report	Tziolis (yellow card) 29'; Buhimed (yellow card) 62'; Al-Khaibari (yellow card) 82'	Stadium: Al-Batin Club Stadium; Attendance: 2,696; Referee: Simon Lee Evans (Wales)

14 December 2018 13	Al-Taawoun	3–0	Al-Fayha	Buraidah
15:15	Tawamba 43', 51', 77' (pen.)	Report	Jaafari (yellow card) 16'	Stadium: King Abdullah Sport City Stadium; Attendance: 2,957; Referee: Svein Oddvar Moen (Norway)

22 December 2018 14	Al-Fayha	3–0	Ohod	Al Majma'ah
15:15	Gómez (yellow card) 11'; Al-Yami 40', (yellow card) 40'; Asprilla 74', 90+4' (pen.)	Report	Mohamad (yellow card) 49'; Teikeu (yellow card) 57'; Laaroubi (yellow card) 90+3'	Stadium: King Salman Sport City Stadium; Attendance: 732; Referee: Sergei Karasev (Russia)

27 December 2018 15	Al-Faisaly	1–0	Al-Fayha	Al Majma'ah
17:55	Luisinho (yellow card) 16'; Calderón 90+1', (yellow card) 90+2'	Report	Al-Owdah (yellow card) 13'; Gegé (yellow card) 45+1'; Asprilla (yellow card) 87'	Stadium: King Salman Sport City Stadium; Attendance: 2,417; Referee: Milorad Mažić (Serbia)

11 January 2019 16	Al-Shabab	4–1	Al-Fayha	Riyadh
15:25	Al-Shamrani 25'; Al-Sulayhem 67'; Salem (yellow card) 70'; Budescu 76' (pen.), 90+3'	Report	Al-Khaibari (yellow card) 53'; Al Salem 71'; Yahaya (yellow card) 74'; Al-Owdah (yellow card) 78'	Stadium: Prince Khalid bin Sultan Stadium; Attendance: 1,559; Referee: Pawel Raczkowski (Poland)

27 January 2019 17	Al-Fayha	1–5	Al-Hilal	Al Majma'ah
18:20	Al-Qarni 82'	Report	Botía (yellow card) 7'; Soriano 27', 43'; Carlos Eduardo 55', 57'; Rivas 90+3'	Stadium: King Salman Sport City Stadium; Attendance: 4,294; Referee: Kevin Blom (Netherlands)

2 February 2019 18	Al-Qadsiah	2–0	Al-Fayha	Khobar
15:20	Camara 67'; Élton 70'	Report	Asprilla (yellow card) 59'; Al-Muziel (yellow card) 60' (yellow-red card) 64'	Stadium: Prince Saud bin Jalawi Stadium; Attendance: 898; Referee: Pawel Raczkowski (Poland)

8 February 2019 19	Al-Fayha	1–1	Al-Ettifaq	Al Majma'ah
15:45	Kiss 49' (o.g.); Al-Sobhi (yellow card) 55'; Bedoui (yellow card) 90+2'	Report	Al-Hazaa 29'; Al-Robeai (yellow card) 48'	Stadium: King Salman Sport City Stadium; Attendance: 1,315; Referee: Simon Lee Evans (Wales)

14 February 2019 20	Al-Fayha	1–2	Al-Fateh	Al Majma'ah
15:45	Al-Qahtani 38'; Al-Muziel (yellow card) 58'	Report	Korzun (yellow card) 52'; Jovanović (yellow card) 63'; Chenihi 69'; Al-Yousef (yellow card) 74'; Al-Hassan 79'	Stadium: King Salman Sport City Stadium; Attendance: 1,107; Referee: Turki Al-Khudhayr

23 February 2019 21	Al-Nassr	1–0	Al-Fayha	Riyadh
20:25	Hamdallah 68' (pen.)	Report	Fallatah (yellow card) 29'; Al-Qahtani (yellow card) 40'; Gegé (yellow card) 51'; Asprilla (yellow card) 70'; Al-Khaibari (yellow card) 73'	Stadium: Prince Faisal bin Fahd Stadium; Attendance: 6,022; Referee: Damir Skomina (Slovenia)

2 March 2019 22	Al-Hazem	0–1	Al-Fayha	Ar Rass
16:00	Pajoy (yellow card) 79'	Report	Al-Sobhi 52'; Kanno (yellow card) 64'; Jaafari (yellow card) 69'; Tziolis (yellow card) 78'	Stadium: Al-Hazem Club Stadium; Attendance: 1,150; Referee: Anastasios Sidiropoulos (Greece)

8 March 2019 23	Al-Ittihad	2–0	Al-Fayha	Jeddah
20:30	Prijović 62' (pen.), 90'	Report		Stadium: King Abdullah Sports City; Attendance: 32,162; Referee: Jorge Sousa (Portugal)

28 March 2019 25	Al-Fayha	2–1	Al-Batin	Al Majma'ah
18:55	Al-Sobhi (yellow card) 40', (goal) 59'; Asprilla 86'; Al-Khaibari (yellow card) 90+4'; Al-Hajoj (yellow card) 90+5'	Report	Jhonnattann (yellow card) 54'; Ounalli 68'; Al-Sobhi (yellow card) 78' (yellow-red card) 90+3'	Stadium: King Salman Sport City Stadium; Attendance: 1,297; Referee: Viktor Kassai (Hungary)

1 April 2019 24	Al-Fayha	0–2	Al-Ahli	Al-Majma'ah
18:55	Gegé (yellow card) 16'; Asprilla (yellow card) 51'; Al-Sobhi (yellow card) 57'; Al-Qahtani (yellow card) 71'; Al-Khaibari (yellow card) 74'	Report	Assiri (yellow card) 20'; Djaniny 39'; Díaz (yellow card) 65'; Al-Mogahwi (yellow card) 82', (goal) 88'	Stadium: King Salman Sport City Stadium; Attendance: 1,221; Referee: Anastasios Sidiropoulos (Greece)

6 April 2019 26	Al-Fayha	2–1	Al-Taawoun	Al Majma'ah
18:55	Asprilla 37', 80'; Al-Muziel (yellow card) 82'; Shafi (yellow card) 90+8'	Report	Adam 45+1', (yellow card) 45+3'; Tawamba (yellow card) 63'; Al-Zubaidi (yellow card) 72'	Stadium: King Salman Sport City Stadium; Attendance: 1,617; Referee: Damir Skomina (Slovenia)

12 April 2019 27	Ohod	1–3	Al-Fayha	Medina
19:20	Hamad (yellow card) 7'; Fouzair 45' (pen.); Teikeu (yellow card) 84'; Attiyah (yellow card) 86'	Report	Asprilla 1', 39'; Al-Muziel (yellow card) 17'; Al-Barakah 27'; Al-Sobhi (yellow card) 45+3'; Buhimed (yellow card) 82'	Stadium: Prince Mohammed bin Abdul Aziz Stadium; Attendance: 1,680; Referee: João Pinheiro (Portugal)

20 April 2019 28	Al-Fayha	3–4	Al-Faisaly	Al Majma'ah
20:30	Asprilla 13', 44' (pen.); Al-Khaibari (yellow card) 23'; Gegé (yellow card) 47'; Al-Barakah (yellow card) 57'; Fallatah (yellow card) 66'; Besara 69'	Report	Rogerinho 5', 25'; Puljić 16', 90+7'; Rossi (yellow card) 43'; Calderón (yellow card) 82'; Hyland (yellow card) 88'	Stadium: King Salman Sport City Stadium; Attendance: 1,707; Referee: Viktor Kassai (Hungary)

11 May 2019 29	Al-Raed	0–0	Al-Fayha	Buraidah
22:30	Kanu (yellow card) 19'; Al-Shamekh (yellow card) 90+2'	Report	Al-Qahtani (yellow card) 90+5'	Stadium: King Abdullah Sport City Stadium; Attendance: 1,360; Referee: Svein Oddvar Moen (Norway)

16 May 2019 30	Al-Fayha	5–2	Al-Wehda	Al Majma'ah
22:30	Besara 1', 44'; Asprilla 14', 30'; Al-Muziel 33'; Shafi (yellow card) 39'; Al-Khaibari (yellow card) 64'	Report	Kasongo 24'; Marcos Guilherme (yellow card) 36'; Al-Amri 90'	Stadium: King Salman Sport City Stadium; Attendance: 1,000; Referee: Kim Sang-woo (South Korea)

=== King Cup ===
All times are local, AST (UTC+3).

1 January 2019 Round of 64	Al-Fayha	6–2	Al-Shahed	Al Majma'ah
18:00	Al Salem 27', 60'; Abdali 46'; Al-Qahtani 55'; Al-Owdah 63'; Ruiz 80'	Report	Al-Ghamdi 21'; Asiri 29'	Stadium: King Salman Sport City Stadium; Referee: Abdullah Al-Shehri

15 January 2019 Round of 32	Wej	0–1	Al-Fayha	Ta'if
15:55	Al-Abdeli (yellow card) 90+2'	Report	Al-Najrani 29'; Kanno (yellow card) 65'; Al-Sobhi (yellow card) 70'	Stadium: King Fahd Stadium; Referee: Hussain Abo Shaheen

21 January 2019 Round of 16	Al-Fayha	0–6	Al-Nassr	Al Majma'ah
18:15	Buhimed (red card) 70'; Asprilla (yellow card) 85'	Report	Al-Jumeiah (yellow card) 11', (goal) 86'; Al-Jebreen (yellow card) 21'; Giuliano 52'; Hamdallah 56', 59', 72', 81'	Stadium: King Salman Sport City Stadium; Referee: Ovidiu Hațegan (Romania)

== Statistics ==
=== Appearances ===
Last updated on 16 May 2019.

No.	Pos	Nat	Player	Total		Pro League		King Cup	
No.	Pos	Nat	Player	Apps	Goals	Apps	Goals	Apps	Goals
Goalkeepers
1	GK	(Saudi Arabia) KSA	Moslem Al Freej	6	0	2+1	0	2+1	0
23	GK	(Colombia) COL	Cristian Bonilla	16	0	15	0	1	0
32	GK	(Saudi Arabia) KSA	Hamad Hawsawi	0	0	0	0	0	0
99	GK	(Jordan) JOR	Amer Shafi	13	0	13	0	0	0
Defenders
2	DF	(Saudi Arabia) KSA	Omar Al-Owdah	13	1	9+2	0	1+1	1
3	DF	(Saudi Arabia) KSA	Omar Al-Muziel	7	1	7	1	0	0
4	DF	(Saudi Arabia) KSA	Sami Al-Khaibari	28	0	26+1	0	1	0
13	DF	(Saudi Arabia) KSA	Naif Kariri	4	0	1+2	0	1	0
14	DF	(Cape Verde) CPV	Gegé	22	0	21+1	0	0	0
19	DF	(Saudi Arabia) KSA	Mohammed Qassem	4	0	2+2	0	0	0
24	DF	(Saudi Arabia) KSA	Ahmed Bamsaud	12	0	7+2	0	3	0
26	DF	(Saudi Arabia) KSA	Abdullah Al-Saleem	0	0	0	0	0	0
27	DF	(Saudi Arabia) KSA	Abdullah Kanno	13	0	9+2	0	2	0
55	DF	(Saudi Arabia) KSA	Nawaf Al-Sobhi	25	2	20+3	2	1+1	0
66	DF	(Tunisia) TUN	Rami Bedoui	9	0	6+1	0	2	0
Midfielders
5	MF	(Greece) GRE	Alexandros Tziolis	31	1	26+3	1	1+1	0
6	MF	(Saudi Arabia) KSA	Dhaifallah Al-Qarni	23	1	14+7	1	1+1	0
10	MF	(Saudi Arabia) KSA	Abdullah Al-Mutairi	1	0	0+1	0	0	0
15	MF	(Saudi Arabia) KSA	Majed Al-Najrani	10	1	2+6	0	2	1
16	MF	(Saudi Arabia) KSA	Abdulrahman Al-Barakah	28	1	24+2	1	1+1	0
17	MF	(Saudi Arabia) KSA	Abdulkareem Al-Qahtani	18	2	14+2	1	2	1
18	MF	(Saudi Arabia) KSA	Hassan Jaafari	18	0	8+9	0	1	0
20	MF	(Ghana) GHA	Seidu Yahaya	5	0	2+1	0	2	0
25	MF	(Saudi Arabia) KSA	Tawfiq Buhimed	25	0	18+4	0	3	0
28	MF	(Saudi Arabia) KSA	Mohanad Fallatah	9	0	8+1	0	0	0
29	MF	(Sweden) SWE	Nahir Besara	11	3	8+3	3	0	0
40	MF	(Saudi Arabia) KSA	Hussain Al Hajoj	5	0	1+4	0	0	0
43	MF	(Saudi Arabia) KSA	Hassan Al Wathila	0	0	0	0	0	0
50	MF	(Saudi Arabia) KSA	Ahmed Abo Ardhen	0	0	0	0	0	0
70	MF	(Colombia) COL	Danilo Asprilla	30	15	28	15	1+1	0
78	MF	(Saudi Arabia) KSA	Raed Al-Bashr	0	0	0	0	0	0
Forwards
33	FW	(Tunisia) TUN	Amine Chermiti	7	0	5+2	0	0	0
76	FW	(Saudi Arabia) KSA	Abdulmohsen Al-Majid	0	0	0	0	0	0
88	FW	(Saudi Arabia) KSA	Mishari Al-Harbi	1	0	0	0	0+1	0
90	FW	(Saudi Arabia) KSA	Nayef Abdali	1	1	0	0	1	1
95	FW	(Brazil) BRA	Iury	5	0	1+3	0	0+1	0
Players sent out on loan this season
9	FW	(Chile) CHI	Ronnie Fernández	14	3	13+1	3	0	0
11	MF	(Saudi Arabia) KSA	Abdullah Al Salem	14	5	8+3	3	3	2
21	MF	(Brazil) BRA	Naldo	7	0	3+4	0	0	0
Player who made an appearance this season but have left the club
7	MF	(Costa Rica) CRC	John Jairo Ruiz	8	1	2+5	0	1	1
8	MF	(Argentina) ARG	Jonathan Gómez	9	1	4+5	1	0	0
12	FW	(Saudi Arabia) KSA	Abdulrahman Al-Yami	8	1	3+5	1	0	0

=== Goalscorers ===
Rank	No.	Pos	Nat	Name	Pro League	King Cup	Total
1	70	MF	(Colombia)	Danilo Asprilla	15	0	15
2	11	FW	(Saudi Arabia)	Abdullah Al-Salem	3	2	5
3	9	FW	(Chile)	Ronnie Fernández	3	0	3
3	29	MF	(Sweden)	Nahir Besara	3	0	3
5	17	MF	(Saudi Arabia)	Abdulkareem Al-Qahtani	1	1	2
5	55	DF	(Saudi Arabia)	Nawaf Al-Sobhi	2	0	2
7	2	DF	(Saudi Arabia)	Omar Al-Owdah	0	1	1
7	3	DF	(Saudi Arabia)	Omar Al-Muziel	1	0	1
7	5	MF	(Greece)	Alexandros Tziolis	1	0	1
7	6	MF	(Saudi Arabia)	Dhaifallah Al-Qarni	1	0	1
7	7	MF	(Costa Rica)	John Jairo Ruiz	0	1	1
7	8	MF	(Argentina)	Jonathan Gómez	1	0	1
7	12	FW	(Saudi Arabia)	Abdulrahman Al-Yami	1	0	1
7	15	MF	(Saudi Arabia)	Majed Al-Najrani	0	1	1
7	16	MF	(Saudi Arabia)	Abdulrahman Al-Barakah	1	0	1
7	90	FW	(Saudi Arabia)	Nayef Abdali	0	1	1
Own goal					3	0	3
Total					36	7	43

Last Updated: 16 May 2019

=== Assists ===
Rank	No.	Pos	Nat	Name	Pro League	King Cup	Total
1	17	MF	(Saudi Arabia)	Abdulkareem Al-Qahtani	5	0	5
2	9	FW	(Chile)	Ronnie Fernández	3	0	3
2	11	FW	(Saudi Arabia)	Abdullah Al Salem	1	2	3
2	16	MF	(Saudi Arabia)	Abdulrahman Al-Barakah	3	0	3
5	3	DF	(Saudi Arabia)	Omar Al-Muziel	2	0	2
5	7	MF	(Costa Rica)	John Jairo Ruiz	1	1	2
5	25	MF	(Saudi Arabia)	Tawfiq Buhimed	2	0	2
8	2	DF	(Saudi Arabia)	Omar Al-Owdah	1	0	1
8	4	DF	(Saudi Arabia)	Sami Al-Khaibari	1	0	1
8	5	MF	(Greece)	Alexandros Tziolis	1	0	1
8	12	FW	(Saudi Arabia)	Abdulrahman Al-Yami	1	0	1
8	14	DF	(Cape Verde)	Gegé	1	0	1
8	18	MF	(Saudi Arabia)	Hassan Jaafari	0	1	1
8	27	DF	(Saudi Arabia)	Abdullah Kanno	0	1	1
8	28	MF	(Saudi Arabia)	Mohanad Fallatah	1	0	1
8	29	MF	(Sweden)	Nahir Besara	1	0	1
Total					24	5	29

Last Updated: 16 May 2019

=== Clean sheets ===
Rank	No.	Pos	Nat	Name	Pro League	King Cup	Total
1	1	GK	(Saudi Arabia)	Moslem Al Freej	1	1	2
1	99	GK	(Jordan)	Amer Shafi	2	0	2
Total					3	1	4

Last Updated: 11 May 2019
