= Hédi (given name) =

Hédi (and its variant Hedi) is a unisex given name. Notable people with the name include:

== People ==
=== Male ===
==== First name ====
- Hédi Annabi (1943–2010), Tunisian diplomat
- Hédi Baccouche (1930–2020), Tunisian politician
- El Hedi Belameiri (born 1991), Algerian football player
- Hédi Berkhissa (1972–1997), Tunisian football player
- Hedi Boukhris (born 1986), Tunisian football player
- Hédi Bouraoui (born 1932)Tunisian Canadian poet, novelist and academic
- Hedi Bousarsar (born 1961), Tunisian volleyball player
- Hedi Gharbi (born 1969), Tunisian sailor
- Hédi Jouini (1909–1990), Tunisian musician
- Hédi Kaddour (born 1945), French poet and novelist
- Hedi Khalfa (born 1994), Tunisian football player
- Hédi Khayachi (1882–1948), Tunisian painter
- Hedi El Kholti (born 1967, Moroccan American writer and editor
- Hédi Lakhoua (1872–1949), Tunisian politician
- Hédi Mabrouk (1921–2000), Tunisian diplomat and politician
- Hédi Majdoub (born 1969), Tunisian politician
- Hedi Mattoussi, Tunisian-American materials scientist
- Hédi M'henni (1942–2024), Tunisian politician
- Hedi Amara Nouira (1911–1993), Tunisian politician
- Hédi Saidi (1897–1948), Tunisian politician
- Hedi Slimane (born 1968), French photographer and fashion designer
- Hedi Souid (born 1983), Tunisian rugby player
- Hédi Teraoui (born 1989), Tunisian racewalker
- Hedi Turki (1922–2019), Tunisian artist of Turkish origin
- Hedi Zaiem (born 1976), Tunisian media personality

==== Middle name ====
- Mohamed Hédi Chérif (1932–2021), Tunisian historian and academic
- Mohamed Hedi Gaaloul (born 1989), Tunisian football player

=== Female ===
- Hedi Beeler (born 1931), Swiss alpine skier
- Hedi Flitz (1900–1994), German politician
- Hédi Fried (1924–2022), Swedish-Romanian author and psychologist
- Hedi Kyle (born 1937), German-born American book artist and educator
- Hedi Lang (1931–2004), Swiss politician
- Hedi Schoop (1906–1995), Swiss-born German cabaret artist, sculptor and painter
- Hedi Stadlen (1916–2004), Austrian Jewish philosopher and political activist
- Hédi Temessy (1925–2001) Hungarian actress
- Hédi Váradi (1929–1987) Hungarian actress
