= 2007–08 Tunisian Ligue Professionnelle 1 =

Tunisian Ligue Professionnelle 1
- Season: 2007–08
- Dates: 11 August 2007 – 22 May 2008
- Champions: Club Africain
- Relegated: Stade Gabésien and Espérance Sportive de Zarzis
- Champions League: Club Africain; Étoile du Sahel
- Confederation Cup: Stade Tunisien; El-Gawafel Sportives de Gafsa; Club Sportif Sfaxien
- Matches: 182
- Goals: 374 (2.05 per match)
- Top goalscorer: Wissem Ben Yahia (10)
- Biggest home win: EGSG 4–0 CAB; ESS 4–0 ESZ; EST 4–0 USM
- Biggest away win: Stade Tunisien 0–4 ES Tunis
- Highest scoring: OB 5–2 SG

The 2007–08 Tunisian Ligue Professionnelle 1 was the 53rd season of top-tier football in Tunisia. It saw Club Africain crowned as champions. Stade Gabésien and Espérance Sportive de Zarzis were relegated to Ligue Professionnelle 2.

It was played in a traditional league format, with 14 teams playing 26 rounds, two matches against every opposing team.

Club Sportif Sfaxien had two points deducted from their end of season total due to walking off field before completion of their round 15 game against Espérance Sportive de Tunis.

== Club directory and team locations ==
Locations of teams in the 2007–08 Tunisian Ligue Professionnelle 1

Club	Location	Founded	Stadium	Capacity
Étoile Sportive du Sahel	Sousse	1925	Stade Olympique de Sousse	25,000
Club Africain	Tunis	1920	Stade Olympique d'El Menzah-Tunis	45,000
Espérance Sportive de Tunis	Tunis	1919	Stade Olympique d'El Menzah-Tunis	45,000
Stade Tunisien	Tunis	1948	Stade Chadly Zouiten	18,000
Avenir Sportif de La Marsa	La Marsa	1939	Stade Abdelaziz Chtioui	6,000
Union Sportive Monastir	Monastir	1923	Stade Mustapha Ben Jannet	25,000
Club Sportif Sfaxien	Sfax	1928	Stade Taïeb Mhiri	18,000
El-Gawafel Sportives de Gafsa	Gafsa	1967	Stade du 7 Novembre	12,000
Olympique de Béja	Béja	1929	Stade Olympique	8,000
Club Sportif de Hammam-Lif	Hammam-Lif	1944	Stade Bou Kornine	8,000
Espérance Sportive de Zarzis	Zarzis	1934	Stade Jlidi	7,000
Bizerte Athletic F.C.	Bizerte	1928	Stade du 15 Octobre	16,000
Jendouba Sport	Jendouba	1922	Stade Municipal de Jendouba	4,000
Stade Gabésien	Gabès	1957	Stade du Zrig	15,000

== Results ==
=== League table ===
Pos	Team	Pld	W	D	L	GF	GA	GD	Pts	Qualification or relegation
1	Club Africain	26	19	6	1	37	12	+25	63	Qualification to the 2009 CAF Champions League
2	Étoile du Sahel	26	18	7	1	40	9	+31	61	Qualification to the 2009 CAF Champions League
3	Espérance de Tunis	26	14	4	8	36	18	+18	46	Qualification to the 2008–09 Arab Champions League
4	US Monastir	26	10	6	10	27	32	−5	36	Qualification to the 2008–09 Arab Champions League
5	Stade Tunisien	26	10	6	10	24	34	−10	36	Qualification to the 2009 CAF Confederation Cup
6	EGS Gafsa	26	11	2	13	35	31	+4	35	Qualification to the 2009 CAF Confederation Cup
7	AS Marsa	26	9	6	11	26	30	−4	33	
8	CA Bizertin	26	9	6	11	25	30	−5	33	
9	CS Hammam-Lif	26	9	5	12	24	28	−4	32	
10	CS Sfaxien	26	7	10	9	28	29	−1	29 (Note: CS Sfaxien abandoned the game against Espérance de Tunis on 29 December 2007 at 85' when the score was 0-2. CS Sfaxien was docked 2 points. Thus it has 29 points instead of 31.)	Qualification to the 2009 CAF Confederation Cup and 2008–09 Arab Champions League
11	Olympique Béja	26	7	7	12	21	26	−5	28	
12	Jendouba Sport	26	6	9	11	18	30	−12	27	
13	Stade Gabèsien	26	5	8	13	21	34	−13	23	Relegation to the Tunisian Ligue Professionnelle 2
14	ES Zarzis	26	2	10	14	12	31	−19	16	Relegation to the Tunisian Ligue Professionnelle 2

Updated to match(es) played on 22 May 2008. Source: Ligue 1
Rules for classification: 1) points; 2) goal difference; 3) number of goals scored.

=== Result table ===
Home \ Away	ASM	CA	CAB	CSHL	CSS	EGSG	EST	ESZ	ESS	JS	OB	SG	ST	USM
AS Marsa	—	0–2	1–0	0–2	0–2	1–0	2–1	1–0	0–2	1–1	1–0	0–1	2–2	4–1
Club Africain	1–0	—	2–0	2–0	1–1	1–0	1–0	2–1	0–0	0–0	1–0	3–2	2–0	1–0
CA Bizertin	0–1	1–2	—	0–1	1–2	3–1	1–0	1–0	0–2	2–0	1–1	1–0	2–1	1–2
CS Hammam-Lif	1–1	0–1	0–1	—	2–3	2–1	0–3	3–1	1–3	0–0	0–0	1–0	1–0	2–1
CS Sfaxien	1–1	0–1	2–3	1–1	—	0–1	0–2	1–0	0–2	2–2	1–1	2–1	2–2	4–1
EGS Gafsa	2–1	2–3	4–0	1–0	1–1	—	0–2	2–1	0–2	4–1	0–1	3–1	0–1	2–1
ES Tunis	2–2	0–1	1–2	2–1	0–0	2–0	—	1–0	0–2	2–0	2–1	1–0	4–1	4–0
ES Zarzis	2–1	0–0	1–1	1–3	1–1	1–2	1–1	—	0–0	0–0	1–0	0–0	1–2	0–1
Étoile du Sahel	2–1	2–2	1–0	1–0	1–0	0–0	1–0	4–0	—	3–1	2–0	4–1	0–1	1–1
Jendouba Sport	1–1	0–3	1–1	0–1	1–0	2–1	0–1	2–0	1–2	—	0–1	1–0	0–1	1–0
Olympique Béja	0–1	1–1	1–0	1–0	0–1	1–3	2–0	0–0	0–2	0–0	—	5–2	1–2	2–1
Stade Gabèsien	2–1	0–2	2–2	1–0	0–0	2–1	0–1	0–0	0–0	3–1	0–0	—	0–1	1–1
Stade Tunisien	1–0	0–1	1–1	1–1	2–1	0–4	0–4	0–0	0–1	1–2	2–1	0–0	—	2–1
US Monastir	1–2	2–1	0–0	2–1	1–0	1–0	0–0	2–0	0–0	0–0	2–1	3–2	2–0	—

Updated to match(es) played on 22 May 2008. Source: Ligue 1
Legend: Blue = home team win; Yellow = draw; Red = away team win.
