= Galbi (disambiguation) =

Galbi may refer to

- Short ribs in Korean
- Galbi, grilled short ribs in Korean cuisine
  - Galbijjim, braised short ribs
  - Galbitang, short ribs soup
  - Dak galbi, stir-fried hot and spicy chicken dish
- Galbi (song), a Hebrew poem
- Fakhreddine Galbi, a Tunisian soccer player
