= Yaken =

Yaken is both a given name and a surname. Notable people with the name include:

- Yaken Zaki (1934–2012), Egyptian footballer
- Bilel Yaken (born 1981), Tunisianian footballer
- Khadija Yaken (born 1972), Moroccan writer
