= 2013–14 Tunisian Cup =

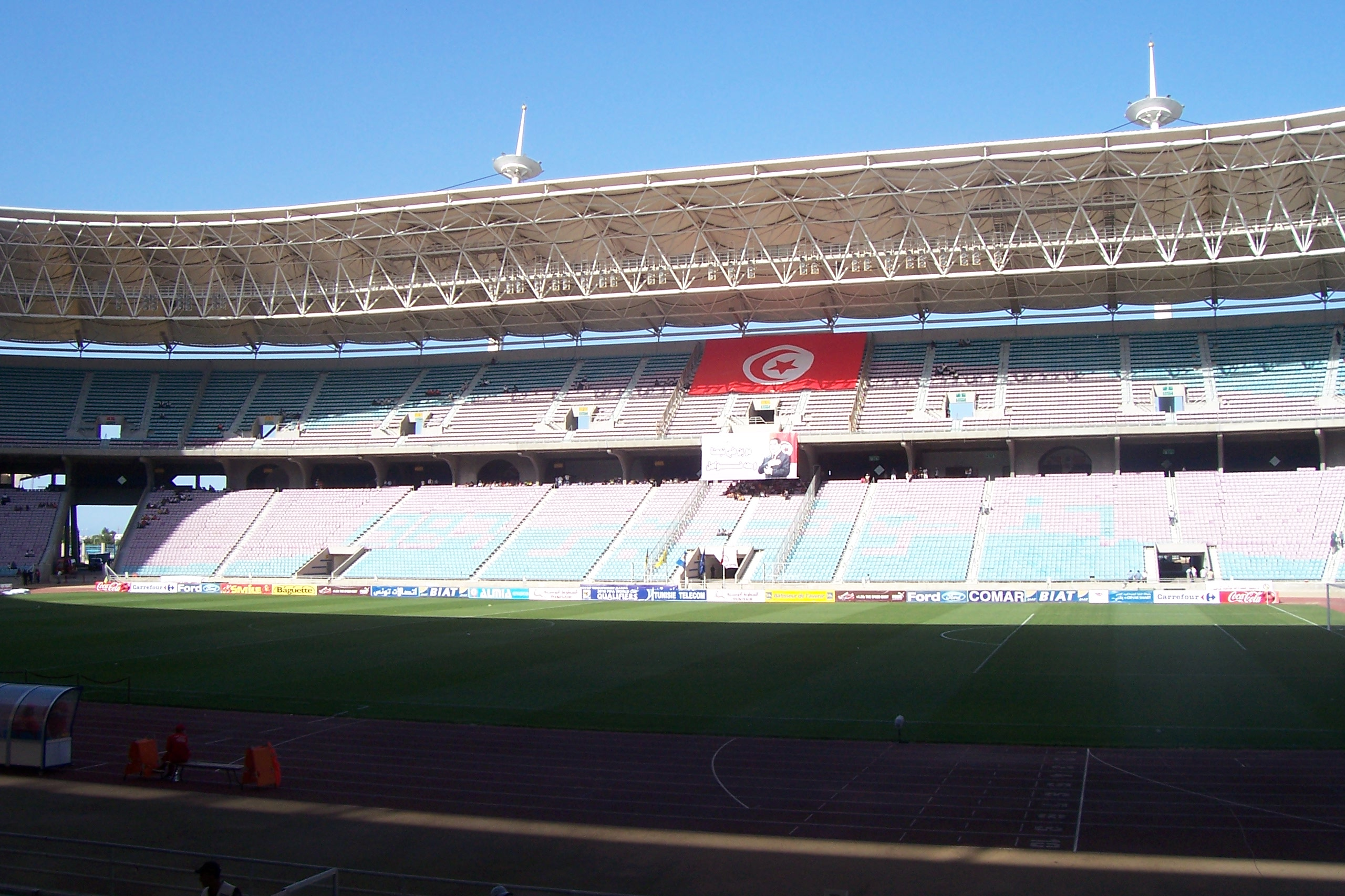
- Stade Olympique de Radès hosted the final

Tournament details
- Country: Tunisia

Final positions
- Champions: Étoile du Sahel
- Runners-up: Club Sfaxien

The 2013–14 Tunisian Cup (Coupe de Tunisie) was the 82nd season of the football cup competition of Tunisia. The competition was organized by the Fédération Tunisienne de Football (FTF) and open to all clubs in Tunisia.
The winner of Tunisian Cup qualifies to 2015 CAF Confederation Cup. But since Étoile du Sahel has already qualified for this competition after finishing in the 3rd position in Ligue 1, and Club Sfaxien having already qualified for the 2015 CAF Champions League after finishing 2nd, the qualification for the 2015 CAF Confederation Cup went to the club that finished 4th in Ligue 1, Club Africain.

== Round of 32 ==
18 April 2014	Espérance de Zarzis	2–3	Avenir de Gabès	Stade Jlidi, Zarzis

19 April 2014	Union Monastirienne	1–1 (a.e.t.) (5–3 p)	Avenir de Marsa	Stade Mustapha Ben Jannet, Monastir

19 April 2014	Vague de Menzel Abderrahmane	1–0	Club de Menzel Bouzelfa	Stade Hmaied Moujahed, Menzel Abderrahmane

19 April 2014	Étoile de Fériana	2–1	Sfax Railway Sports	Stade Fériana, Fériana

19 April 2014	Jendouba Sport	2–0	Club de Hajeb El Ayoun	Stade Municipal de Jendouba, Jendouba

19 April 2014	Union de Siliana	1–2	El Gawafel de Gafsa	Siliana

19 April 2014	Union de Ben Guerdane	1–2	Club Sfaxien	Stade de Ben Guerdane, Ben Guerdane

20 April 2014	Avenir de Kasserine	2–3	Étoile de Métlaoui	Stade de Kasserine, Kasserine

20 April 2014	Al Ahly Hajri	0–2	Jeunesse Kairouanaise	Bouhjar

20 April 2014	Stade Nabeulien	1–3	Club de Hammam-Lif	Nabeul

20 April 2014	Hirondelle de Kalâa Kebira	0–3	Palme de Tozeur	Kalâa Kebira

20 April 2014	Espérance de Tunis	3–1	Olympique Béja	Stade Olympique de Radès, Tunis

20 April 2014	Espoir de Haffouz	0–1	Club Africain	Haffouz

20 April 2014	Grombalia Sports	0–1	Stade Tunisien	Stade municipal de Grombalia, Grombalia

24 April 2014	Étoile du Fahs	0–4	Étoile du Sahel	El Fahs

10 May 2014	Stade Gabèsien	1–1 (a.e.t.) (5–4 p)	Club Bizertin	Stade Municipal de Gabès, Gabès

== Round of 16 ==
11 June 2014	Stade Tunisien	2–0	Palme de Tozeur	Stade Chedli Zouiten, Tunis

12 June 2014	Club Africain	1–0	Stade Gabèsien	Stade El Menzah, Tunis
15:30

12 June 2014	Jeunesse Kairouanaise	1–0 (a.e.t.)	El Gawafel de Gafsa	Stade Ali Zouaoui, Kairouan
15:30

12 June 2014	Espérance de Tunis	3–1	Club de Hammam-Lif	Stade Olympique de Radès, Tunis
15:30

12 June 2014	Avenir de Gabès	0–2	Étoile de Métlaoui	Stade Municipal de Gabès, Gabès
15:30

12 June 2014	Vague de Menzel Abderrahmane	0–3	Club Sfaxien	Stade Hmaied Moujahed, Menzel Abderrahmane
15:30

12 June 2014	Jendouba Sport	0–3	Union Monastirienne	Stade Municipal de Jendouba, Jendouba
15:30

12 June 2014	Étoile de Fériana	0–3	Étoile du Sahel	Stade Fériana, Fériana
15:30

== Quarter-finals ==
15 June 2014	Espérance de Tunis	1–2	Club Sfaxien	Stade Olympique de Radès, Tunis
15:30				Referee: Haithem Kosai

15 June 2014	Club Africain	0–1	Stade Tunisien	Stade El Menzah, Tunis
15:30				Referee: Slim Belkhouass

15 June 2014	Étoile du Sahel	3–0	Étoile de Métlaoui	Stade Olympique de Sousse, Sousse
15:30				Referee: Khaled Guizani

15 June 2014	Union Monastirienne	0–2	Jeunesse Kairouanaise	Stade Mustapha Ben Jannet, Monastir
15:30				Referee: Slim Jedidi

== Semi-finals ==
21 June 2014	Club Sfaxien	2–0 (a.e.t.)	Jeunesse Kairouanaise	Stade Taïeb Mhiri, Sfax

21 June 2014	Stade Tunisien	0–0 (a.e.t.) (4–5 p)	Étoile du Sahel	Stade El Menzah, Tunis
16:00				Referee: Mohamed Said Kordi

== Final ==
27 June 2014	Étoile du Sahel	1–0	Club Sfaxien	Stade Olympique de Radès, Tunis
17:00				Referee: Youssef Serairi

== See also ==
- 2013–14 Tunisian Ligue Professionnelle 1
- 2013–14 Tunisian Ligue Professionnelle 2
