= Rami Bedoui =

Tunisian footballer

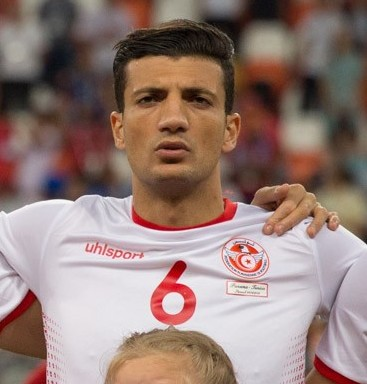
- Bedoui lining up with Tunisia at the 2018 FIFA World Cup

Personal information
- Date of birth: 19 January 1990 (age 36)
- Place of birth: Sousse, Tunisia
- Height: 1.87 m (6 ft 2 in)
- Position: Centre back

Senior career*
Years	Team	Apps	(Gls)
2011–2020	Étoile du Sahel	136	(11)
2019	→ Al-Fayha (loan)	7	(0)
2020	Liepāja	0	(0)
2020–2021	Kuwait SC	7	(0)
2021–2025	Club Africain	32	(1)

International career^{‡}
2012–2019	Tunisia	20	(0)
- * Club domestic league appearances and goals as of 10:16, 17 July 2019 (UTC) ‡ National team caps and goals as of 10:53, 25 July 2019 (UTC)

Rami Bedoui (Arabic: رامي البدوي; born 19 January 1990) is a Tunisian former professional footballer who played as a centre back.

== International career ==
In June 2018 he was named in Tunisia's 23-man squad for the 2018 FIFA World Cup in Russia.

== Career statistics ==
=== International ===
As of 25 July 2019

Tunisia
Year	Apps	Goals
2012	3	0
2013	0	0
2014	1	0
2015	1	0
2016	0	0
2017	4	0
2018	2	0
2019	7	0
Total	18	0

== Honours ==
Étoile du Sahel

- Tunisian Ligue Professionnelle 1: 2015–16; runners-up: 2010–11, 2014–15, 2016–17
- Tunisian Cup: 2012, 2013–14, 2014–15; runners-up: 2010–11
