= 2013–14 Tunisian Ligue Professionnelle 2 =

Tunisian Ligue Professionnelle 2
- Season: 2013–14
- Promoted: AS Djerba; AS Gabès; ES Zarzis
- Relegated: ES Beni-Khalled; CO Transports; CS Hilalien
- Matches played: 211
- Goals scored: 441 (2.09 per match)

The 2013–14 Tunisian Ligue Professionnelle 2 (Tunisian Professional League) season was the 59th season since Tunisia's independence.

== Teams ==
The league was contested by 20 teams split into two groups of 10 teams each.

== Results ==
=== Group A ===
Pos	Team	Pld	W	D	L	GF	GA	GD	Pts	Qualification or relegation
1	AS Gabès	18	12	4	2	29	14	+15	40	Qualification for Promotion Playoffs
2	AS Djerba	18	9	4	5	22	16	+6	31	Qualification for Promotion Playoffs
3	ES Zarzis	18	8	6	4	20	14	+6	30	Qualification for Promotion Playoffs
4	EO Sidi Bouzid	18	6	5	7	19	17	+2	23	
5	CS M'saken	18	6	5	7	22	22	0	23	
6	Sporting Ben Arous	18	6	5	7	18	20	−2	23	
7	AS Ariana	18	7	2	9	18	23	−5	23	
8	AS Kasserine	18	6	3	9	19	26	−7	21	
9	CS Hilalien	18	5	5	8	17	23	−6	20	Qualification for Relegation Playoff
10	ES Beni-Khalled	18	3	5	10	11	20	−9	14	Relegation to Tunisian Ligue Professionnelle 3

Source: LIGUE 2 Group A
Rules for classification: 1) points; 2) goal difference; 3) number of goals scored.

=== Group B ===
Pos	Team	Pld	W	D	L	GF	GA	GD	Pts	Qualification or relegation
1	US Ben Guerdane	18	8	8	2	28	20	+8	32	Qualification for Promotion Playoffs
2	Stade Sportif Sfaxien	18	8	4	6	15	16	−1	28	Qualification for Promotion Playoffs
3	Jendouba Sport	18	7	6	5	14	13	+1	27	Qualification for Promotion Playoffs
4	ES Hammam-Sousse	18	7	5	6	19	16	+3	26	
5	CS Korba	18	6	7	5	25	19	+6	25	
6	Sfax Railways Sports	18	4	10	4	15	13	+2	22	
7	Enfida Sports	18	6	4	8	12	15	−3	22	
8	FC Hammamet	18	6	4	8	16	22	−6	22	
9	Olympique du Kef	18	4	8	6	14	16	−2	20	Qualification for Relegation Playoff
10	CO Transports	18	4	4	10	11	19	−8	16	Relegation to Tunisian Ligue Professionnelle 3

Source: LIGUE 2 Group B
Rules for classification: 1) points; 2) goal difference; 3) number of goals scored.

== Playoffs ==
=== Promotion playoffs ===
Pos	Team	Pld	W	D	L	GF	GA	GD	Pts	Promotion
1	AS Djerba	10	7	1	2	12	8	+4	22	Promotion to 2014–15 Tunisian Ligue 1
2	AS Gabès	10	6	3	1	17	9	+8	21	Promotion to 2014–15 Tunisian Ligue 1
3	ES Zarzis	10	4	2	4	11	9	+2	14	Promotion to 2014–15 Tunisian Ligue 1
4	US Ben Guerdane	10	3	2	5	14	15	−1	11	
5	Stade Sportif Sfaxien	10	2	2	6	14	19	−5	8	
6	Jendouba Sport	10	2	2	6	9	17	−8	8	

Source: Ligue 2 Promotion Playoff
Rules for classification: 1) points; 2) goal difference; 3) number of goals scored.

=== Relegation playoff ===
26 March 2014
14:30

Olympique du Kef	0–0 (a.e.t.)	CS Hilalien
Penalties
	8–7

==== Relegated teams ====
- ES Beni-Khalled
- Club Olympique des Transports
- CS Hilalien

== See also ==
- 2013–14 Tunisian Ligue Professionnelle 1
- 2013–14 Tunisian Cup
