= Imed Louati =

Tunisian footballer

Personal information
- Full name: Imed Louati
- Date of birth: 11 October 1993 (age 33)
- Place of birth: Sfax, Tunisia
- Height: 1.92 m (6 ft 4 in)
- Position: Forward

Team information
- Current team: Dalkurd
- Number: 10

Senior career*
Years	Team	Apps	(Gls)
2012–2015	CS Sfaxien	27	(1)
2015	→ Zhejiang Professional (loan)	14	(1)
2015–2016	Zhejiang Professional	0	(0)
2015	→ Gyeongnam (loan)	12	(2)
2016	→ Dalkurd (loan)	5	(3)
2017–2019	Vejle	53	(16)
2019–2021	Hobro	24	(2)
2021–2022	ES Sahel	6	(0)
2022	Al-Nasr Benghazi	0	(0)
2022–2023	Al-Ittihad Tripoli	0	(0)
2023–	Dalkurd	12	(6)
- * Club domestic league appearances and goals as of 17 November 2023

Imed Louati (born 11 October 1993) is a Tunisian professional footballer who plays as a forward for Ettan Fotboll club Dalkurd.

== Club career ==
=== Club Sportif Sfaxien ===
Louati started his football career with Tunisian Ligue Professionnelle 1 club CS Sfaxien in 2012. On 1 September 2012, he made his senior debut in a league match against EGS Gafsa, coming on as a substitute for Fakhreddine Ben Youssef in the 82nd minute. He was described by Philippe Troussier, who was the manager of CS Sfaxien in 2014, as a hot prospect for the future.

=== Zhejiang Professional F.C. ===
On 8 January 2015, CS Sfaxien announced Louati would loan to Chinese Super League side Hangzhou Greentown for six months, rejoining Philippe Troussier. Zhejiang Professional confirmed the loan deal on 28 January. Zhejiang Professional made the move permanent in June 2015; however, after Troussier was sacked by the club, Louati was loaned to K League 2 side Gyeongnam in July 2015.

=== Dalkurd Fotbollsförening ===
Louati spend the fall of 2016 in Swedish second tier club Dalkurd FF. He scored three goals in five matches before he got injured and had to see the rest of the 2016-season from the stands.

=== Vejle Boldklub ===
On the 9th of February the Danish club Vejle Boldklub announced that Imed Louati had travelled to Turkey with the squad to participate in a training camp prior to the last part of the 2016/2017-season. The club announced that a free transfer would be announced during the training camp.

He scorede 10 league goals and became topscorer in Vejle Boldklub in the 2017/2018-season in which the club won promotion to Danish Superliga.

Vejle got relegated in the following season and announced on 10 July 2019, that Louati's contract had been terminated by mutual consent after playing 61 games in total for the club and scored 17 goals.

=== Hobro IK ===
On 13 September 2019, Louati signed a two-year contract with Hobro IK in the Danish Superliga. Louati left Hobro again at the end of the 2020-21 season.

== Career statistics ==
As of match played 10 December 2017

Appearances and goals by club, season and competition
Club	Season	League			National Cup		Other		Total	
Club	Season	Division	Apps	Goals	Apps	Goals	Apps	Goals	Apps	Goals
CS Sfaxien	2011–12	Ligue Professionnelle 1	1	0	0	0	0	0	1	0
CS Sfaxien	2012–13	Ligue Professionnelle 1	3	0	0	0	0	0	3	0
CS Sfaxien	2013–14	Ligue Professionnelle 1	15	0	0	0	0	0	15	0
CS Sfaxien	2014–15	Ligue Professionnelle 1	8	1	0	0	6 (Note: Appearances in the CAF Champions League)	0	14	1
CS Sfaxien	Total		27	1	0	0	6	0	33	1
Zhejiang Professional (loan)	2015	Chinese Super League	14	1	0	0	0	0	14	1
Gyeongnam (loan)	2015	K League Challenge	12	2	0	0	0	0	12	2
Dalkurd (loan)	2016	Superettan	5	3	0	0	0	0	5	3
Vejle	2016–17	1. Division	10	4	0	0	0	0	10	4
Vejle	2017–18	1. Division	15	5	0	0	0	0	15	5
Vejle	Total		25	9	0	0	0	0	25	9
Career total			83	16	0	0	6	0	89	16

== Honours ==
Sfaxien

- CAF Confederation Cup: 2013
- Tunisian Ligue Professionnelle 1: 2012–13
