= Jinzhong Prison =

Prison in Jinzhong, Shanxi, China

Jinzhong Prison is a prison in Jinzhong District in Shanxi province of China. It has or has had 13 jail areas. It is connected to prison enterprises. It used to be known as Shanxi Provincial No. 1 Prison.

== See also ==
- Taiyuan No. 3 Prison
