= Naldo (footballer, born 1990) =

Brazilian footballer

Personal information
- Full name: Marinaldo dos Santos Oliveira
- Date of birth: 13 May 1990 (age 36)
- Place of birth: Maetinga, Brazil
- Height: 1.85 m (6 ft 1 in)
- Positions: Centre back; defensive midfielder

Senior career*
Years	Team	Apps	(Gls)
2009–2012	Vitória da Conquista	10	(0)
2011	→ Itabuna (loan)	11	(1)
2012	→ Volta Redonda (loan)	14	(0)
2012–2013	Belomonte	0	(0)
2012–2013	→ Atlético Paranaense (loan)	4	(0)
2013	→ Joinville (loan)	9	(0)
2014–2018	Joinville	132	(2)
2017	→ Ponte Preta (loan)	31	(2)
2018	→ Ceará (loan)	10	(1)
2018–2019	Al-Fayha	7	(0)
2019	CSA	24	(0)
2020	Botafogo-SP	20	(0)
2021	Joinville	17	(1)
2022–2023	Portuguesa	22	(1)
- * Club domestic league appearances and goals as of 13:36, 17 March 2023 (UTC)

Marinaldo dos Santos Oliveira (born 13 May 1990), commonly known as Naldo, is a Brazilian footballer who plays as either a central defender or a defensive midfielder.

== Career statistics ==
As of 17 March 2023

Club	Season	League			State League		Cup		Continental		Other		Total	
Club	Season	Division	Apps	Goals	Apps	Goals	Apps	Goals	Apps	Goals	Apps	Goals	Apps	Goals
Vitória da Conquista	2010	Baiano	—		1	0	—		—		—		1	0
Vitória da Conquista	2011	Série D	5	0	1	0	—		—		—		6	0
Vitória da Conquista	2012	Série D	—		3	0	—		—		—		3	0
Vitória da Conquista	Subtotal		5	0	5	0	—		—		—		10	0
Volta Redonda	2012	Série D	—		14	0	—		—		—		14	0
Atlético Paranaense	2012	Série B	4	0	—		—		—		—		4	0
Joinville	2013	Série B	9	0	—		—		—		—		9	0
Joinville	2014	Série B	27	1	16	0	1	0	—		—		44	1
Joinville	2015	Série A	24	0	18	0	2	0	0	0	—		44	0
Joinville	2016	Série B	34	0	13	1	0	0	—		—		47	1
Joinville	Subtotal		94	1	47	1	3	0	0	0	—		144	2
Ponte Preta	2017	Série A	24	2	7	0	1	0	5 (Note: Appearance(s) in Copa Sudamericana)	0	—		37	2
Ceará	2018	Série A	5	1	5	0	0	0	—		4 (Note: Appearance(s) in Copa do Nordeste)	1	14	2
Al-Fayha	2018–19	Saudi Professional League	7	0	—		0	0	—		—		7	0
CSA	2019	Série B	24	0	—		—		—		1	0	25	0
Botafogo-SP	2020	Série B	11	0	9	0	—		—		—		20	0
Joinville	2021	Série D	12	1	5	0	1	0	—		3 (Note: Appearance(s) in Copa Santa Catarina)	0	21	1
Portuguesa	2022	Paulista A2	—		15	0	—		—		7 (Note: Appearance(s) in Copa Paulista)	1	22	1
Portuguesa	2023	Paulista	—		7	1	—		—		—		7	1
Portuguesa	Subtotal		—		22	1	—		—		7	1	29	2
Career total			186	5	114	2	5	0	5	0	15	2	325	9
