= List of prisons in Shanxi province =

This is a list of prisons within Shanxi province of the People's Republic of China.

Name	Enterprise name	City/County/District	Village/Town	Established	Notes
Changzhi Prison		Changzhi			
Datong Prison		Datong			
Fenyang Prison	Fenyang Valve Factory	Fenyang		1950	
Huozhou Prison		Huozhou, Linfen		1952	
Jincheng Prison	Jinpushan Coal Mine	Zezhou County, Jincheng			About 2,000 prisoners
Jinzhong Prison	Shanxi Aluminum Products Factory; Zhiqing Carton Factory; Automobile Repair Plant	Qi County, Shanxi			More than 2,000 male prisoners, aluminum magnesium teapot of Fenshui brand
Linfen Prison	Fenhe Automobile Manufacturing Works	Linfen		1955	80% have death sentences, life sentences or long-term sentences. In 2003, about 100 prisoners were paroled, compared to 229 in 2002
Lucheng Prison		Lucheng, Changzhi			
Pingyao Prison	Pingyao Prison Machine Factory	Pingyao, Jinzhong		1954	
Provincial Juvenile Offender Detachment	Pingyao Match Factory				
Prov. No. 2 Prison	Qixian Textile Mill; New Materials Factory	Qi County, Shanxi			
Prov. No. 5 Prison	Changzhi Machine Repair Works	Changzhi			
Shanxi Women’s Prison	Yuci Chemical Works; Taiyuan Garment Factory	Yuci District		1970	Total 541 prisoners in 2000
Taiyuan No. 1 Prison	Xiyu Coal Mine; Taiyuan Pneumatic Tool Works	Taiyuan		1951	
Taiyuan No. 2 Prison	Taiyuan Brickyard (Dongtaibao Brick Works); Shanxi Prov. New Type Building Materials Factory	Nanzheng County			
Taiyuan No. 3 Prison	Taiyuan Gas Compressor Factory		Boming	1952	
Xinzhou Prison	Jiecun Farm, Cattle Farm	Xinzhou, Shanxi	Boming		
Yangquan No. 1 Prison	Yinying Coal Mine	Yangquan	Yinying	1952	7,000 prisoners in 1992
Yangquan No.2 Prison	Guzhuang Coal Mine	Yangquan	Hedi	1965	Area of 12.33 km^{2}
Yongji Prison	Wuxinghu Farm	Yongji, Shanxi			
Yuanping Prison		Yuanping, Shanxi, Xinzhou, Shanxi			

== Sources ==
- "Laogai Handbook 2007-2008" (PDF) (in Chinese and English). Washington, D.C.: Laogai Research Foundation. October 2008. pp. 423–436. ISBN 978-1-931550-25-3.
