= Najah Hamadi =

Tunisian footballer (born 1984)

Personal information
- Date of birth: 8 March 1984 (age 42)
- Height: 1.88 m (6 ft 2 in)
- Position: Forward

Senior career*
Years	Team	Apps	(Gls)
2011–2013	ES Beni-Khalled		
2013–2015	ES Métlaoui		
2015	AS Gabès		
2015	EO Sidi Bouzid		
2015–2016	JS Kairouan		
2016	Olympique Béja		
2016–2017	Stade Tunisien		
2017	US Monastir		
2017–2018	Jendouba Sport		
2018–?	AS Marsa		
- * Club domestic league appearances and goals

Najah Hamadi (born 8 March 1984) is a Tunisian football forward.
