= Amine Aouichaoui =

Tunisian footballer

Personal information
- Full name: Mohamed Amine Aouichaoui
- Date of birth: 18 July 1982 (age 44)
- Height: 1.82 m (6 ft 0 in)
- Position: Forward

Senior career*
Years	Team	Apps	(Gls)
2006–2007	Club Africain		
2008–2010	ES Hammam-Sousse		
2010–2012	AS Gabès		
2012–2013	ES Hammam-Sousse		
2013	Olympique du Kef		
2013–2014	Grombalia Sports		
2014–2015	ES Métlaoui		
2015	US Ben Guerdane		
2015–2016	AS Kasserine		
2016–2017	AS Marsa		
2017	US Monastir		
- * Club domestic league appearances and goals

Amine Aouichaoui (born 18 July 1982) is a retired Tunisian football striker.
