= Zouhaier Attia =

Tunisian footballer

Personal information
- Date of birth: 28 June 1989 (age 37)
- Place of birth: Tunisia
- Position: Midfielder

Senior career*
Years	Team	Apps	(Gls)
2014–2015	AS Djerba		
2015–2017	ES Zarzis		
2017–2018	AS Gabès		
2018–2020	US Ben Guerdane		
- * Club domestic league appearances and goals

Zouhaier Attia (born 28 June 1989) is a Tunisian footballer. He is right-footed and played the primary position of an attacking midfielder, but also worked the roles of left and right winger. He began his career on August 13, 2014, when he played in his first game with AS Djerba. Attia played with Djerba for one season and on, July 1, 2015, he transferred to ES Zarzis. He played two seasons with the club until he transferred to AS Gabès. He played with Gabès from July 1, 2017, to December 19, 2018, when he made his final transfer and joined US Ben Guerdane. After nearly two years of play there, he left the club and has been without a club since October 1, 2020. Attia has no record of serious injury or absences from games.

== Statistics ==
Throughout his six-year-long career, Attia played the most games (49) for ES Zarzis, his second club, and played the fewest (19) for AS Gabès, his third club. Attia scored six goals across 111 games, scoring zero goals during his 21-game tenure with US Ben Guerdane, one during his 19 games at AS Gabès, two in 49 games at ES Zarzis and two goals in his 22 games at AS Djerba. He received eight yellow cards in his career but was not once ejected during a game, from either two yellow cards or one red card. Of all 111 games played, Attia was an on-field starter in 71 of them.
