= Yangquan No. 1 Prison =

Prison in Shanxi, China

Yangquan No. 1 Prison is a prison in Yinying Town in Shanxi province of China. It was founded in June 1952. It is connected to Yinying Coal Mine, said to be a forced labour mine, which produces 1.38 million tonnes of high grade anthracite per year. In 1992 it housed 7000 inmates.
