= Younes Mazhoud =

Tunisian footballer

Personal information
- Date of birth: 29 November 1991 (age 34)
- Position: Midfielder

Senior career*
Years	Team	Apps	(Gls)
2012–2014	AS Gabès		
2014–2015	Club Africain		
2015	AS Gabès		
- * Club domestic league appearances and goals

Younes Mazhoud (born 29 November 1991) is a retired Tunisian football midfielder.
