= Charfeddine Belhaj =

Tunisian footballer

Personal information
- Date of birth: 7 July 1985 (age 41)
- Position: Defender

Senior career*
Years	Team	Apps	(Gls)
2009–2011	EGS Gafsa		
2011–2012	ES Zarzis		
2012–2014	Stade Gabèsien		
2014	US Ben Guerdane		
2015–2016	ES Metlaoui		
- * Club domestic league appearances and goals

Charfeddine Belhaj (born 7 July 1985) is a Tunisian football defender.
