= Hamza Zakar =

Tunisian footballer

Personal information
- Date of birth: 14 August 1986 (age 40)
- Position: Defender

Senior career*
Years	Team	Apps	(Gls)
2008–2009	CA Bizertin		
2009–2010	EGS Gafsa		
2010–2012	Stade Tunisien		
2012–2013	Stade Gabèsien		
2013–2014	LPS Tozeur		
2014–2017	JS Kairouan		
- * Club domestic league appearances and goals

Hamza Zakar (born 14 August 1986) is a retired Tunisian football defender.
