= Heithem Ben Salem =

Tunisian footballer

Personal information
- Date of birth: 25 April 1988 (age 38)
- Height: 1.82 m (6 ft 0 in)
- Position: Forward

Senior career*
Years	Team	Apps	(Gls)
2008–2011	CA Bizertin		
2012	CS Sfaxien		
2012–2015	Stade Tunisien		
2014	→ LPS Tozeur (loan)		
2015–2016	AS Marsa		
2016	Étoile du Sahel		
2016–2018	JS Kairouan		
- * Club domestic league appearances and goals

Heithem Ben Salem (born 25 April 1988) is a retired Tunisian football striker. (Note: Heithem Ben Salem at WorldFootball.net)
