= Hedi Mattoussi =

Tunisian-American materials scientist

- Born: Tunisia
- Education: University of Tunis El Manar; Université Pierre et Marie Curie
- Scientific career
- Workplaces: Florida State University; United States Naval Research Laboratory
- Thesis: Contribution à l'étude de polymères mésomorphes en solutions : études statique, dynamique et conformationnelles (1987)

Hedi Mattoussi is a Tunisian-American materials scientist and professor at Florida State University. His research considers colloidal inorganic nanocrystals for biological imaging and sensing. He is a Fellow of the American Physical Society, American Chemical Society and Materials Research Society.

== Early life and education ==
Mattoussi studied physics at the University of Tunis El Manar, which he completed with honours in 1982. He completed his doctoral research at the Université Pierre-et-Marie-Curie, where he studied mesomorphic polymers in solution. On completing his PhD, Mattoussi was made a research associate at the Collège de France. He moved to the United States in 1987, first joining University of Massachusetts Amherst, then Carnegie Mellon University.

== Research and career ==
In 1992 Mattoussi joined the University of Florida, where he worked as an assistant scientist in the department of physics. Mattoussi joined the United States Naval Research Laboratory in 1997, where he served as principal investigator. There he developed inorganic nanoparticles and studied how they interact with biological systems.

Mattoussi joined the faculty at Florida State University as a professor of chemistry, where he leads a group that study the interfaces between inorganic nanocrystals and biological systems. To this end, he designs and synthesises novel nanocrystals based on semiconductors and metallic nanoparticles, creates multifunctional ligands and studies nanoparticle-bioconjugates. He has used quantum dot fluorophore to study the Förster resonance energy transfer process.

Mattoussi serves on the advisory board of Physical Chemistry Chemical Physics.

== Awards and honours ==
- 2008 Top Navy Engineer of the Year
- 2011 Elected Fellow of the American Chemical Society
- 2014 Elected Fellow of the American Physical Society
- 2020 Elected Fellow of the Materials Research Society

== Selected publications ==
- Medintz, Igor L.; Uyeda, H. Tetsuo; Goldman, Ellen R.; Mattoussi, Hedi (2005). "Quantum dot bioconjugates for imaging, labelling and sensing". Nature Materials. 4 (6): 435–446. doi:10.1038/nmat1390. ISSN 1476-1122. PMID 15928695. S2CID 13737788.
- Dabbousi, B. O.; Rodriguez-Viejo, J.; Mikulec, F. V.; Heine, J. R.; Mattoussi, H.; Ober, R.; Jensen, K. F.; Bawendi, M. G. (1997). "(CdSe)ZnS Core−Shell Quantum Dots: Synthesis and Characterization of a Size Series of Highly Luminescent Nanocrystallites". The Journal of Physical Chemistry B. 101 (46): 9463–9475. doi:10.1021/jp971091y. ISSN 1520-6106.
- Jaiswal, Jyoti K.; Mattoussi, Hedi; Mauro, J. Matthew; Simon, Sanford M. (2002-12-02). "Long-term multiple color imaging of live cells using quantum dot bioconjugates". Nature Biotechnology. 21 (1): 47–51. doi:10.1038/nbt767. ISSN 1087-0156. PMID 12459736. S2CID 27963244.
- Inorganic nanoprobes for biological sensing and imaging. Mattoussi, Hedi., Cheon, Jinwoo. Boston: Artech House. 2009. ISBN 978-1-59693-197-8. OCLC 434509221.
