= Hamza Hadda =

Tunisian footballer

Personal information
- Date of birth: 18 April 1991 (age 35)
- Place of birth: Tunis, Tunisia
- Height: 1.85 m (6 ft 1 in)
- Position: Midfielder

Team information
- Current team: AS Marsa

Senior career*
Years	Team	Apps	(Gls)
2010–2012	Espérance de Tunis		
2012–2013	Stade Gabèsien		
2014–2016	CS Sfaxien		
2015–2016	→ Stade Gabèsien (loan)		
2016–2017	Stade Gabèsien		
2017–2018	US Monastir		
2018–2021	Stade Tunisien		
2021–2022	Al-Nairyah		
2022–	AS Marsa		
- * Club domestic league appearances and goals

Hamza Hadda (born 18 April 1991) is a retired Tunisian football midfielder plays for AS Marsa as a midfielder.
