= Nizar Issaoui =

Tunisian footballer (1987–2023)

Personal information
- Date of birth: 30 September 1987
- Place of birth: Haffouz, Tunisia
- Date of death: 13 April 2023 (aged 35)
- Place of death: Ben Arous, Tunisia
- Height: 1.92 m (6 ft 4 in)
- Position: Forward

Senior career*
Years	Team	Apps	(Gls)
2011-2013	Grombalia Sports		
2013-2014	LPS Tozeur	11	(5)
2014	US Monastirienne	18	(8)
2014-2015	AS Gabès		
2015	Al-Orobah		
2015-2016	EGS Gafsa	7	(1)
2016	LPS Tozeur		
2016-2018	SA Menzel Bourguiba		
2018-2019	CS Jebiniana		
2019	AS Jilma		
2019-2022	ES Haffouz		
2022-2023	US Ksour Essef		
2023	ES El Jem		
- * Club domestic league appearances and goals

Nizar Issaoui (Arabic: نزار العيساوي; 30 September 1987 – 13 April 2023) was a Tunisian professional footballer who played as a forward.

== Club career ==
Issaoui signed his first professional contract at the age of 24 in 2011, at Grombalia Sports then in the Tunisian second tier, and contributed to the clubs promotion to the top flight.

In 2012, Issaoui and Nasser Chabani, another Grombalia Sports player, were accused of hitting and insulting police officers, and of disturbing public order during a Ligue 2 match, which led to Issaoui spending a few months in prison. In 2013, he signed for Tozeur, where he scores five goals. That same year, he received interest from Club Africain, Etoile du Sahel de Sousse and CA Bizertin. In 2014, Issaoui signed for Monastir. He made eighteen appearances and scored one goal and recorded one assist for the club. However, later that year, he was sent to train with the youth academy due to disciplinary issues. In 2015, he signed for Saudi Arabian side Al-Orobah. After that, he signed for Gafsa in Tunisia, where he made seven appearances and scored one goal.

== International career ==
In 2014, Issaoui received interest to be called up by the Tunisia national team. However, he never played for the national team, which he claimed was due to his arrest record.

== Death ==
On 13 April 2023, Issaoui died after setting himself on fire in what Issaoui said was a protest against Tunisia's “police state”. During his funeral, demonstrators started throwing stones at police, who retaliated with tear gas.

== Personal life ==
Issaoui had four children.
