= Slim Jedaïed =

Tunisian footballer

Personal information
- Date of birth: 20 September 1989 (age 37)
- Place of birth: Sousse, Tunisia
- Height: 1.80 m (5 ft 11 in)
- Position: Forward

Senior career*
Years	Team	Apps	(Gls)
2007–2011	Étoile du Sahel		
2010–2011	→ AS Marsa (loan)		
2012–2013	US Monastir		
2013–2014	CS Sfaxien		
2014–2015	JS Kairouan		
2016–2018	Stade Tunisien		
- * Club domestic league appearances and goals

Slim Jedaïed (born 20 September 1989) is a retired Tunisian football striker.
