= Foued Khrayfi =

Tunisian footballer

Personal information
- Date of birth: 28 April 1991 (age 35)
- Position: Forward

Senior career*
Years	Team	Apps	(Gls)
2011–2013	CS Sfaxien		
2013–2014	US Monastir		
2014	Stade Gabèsien		
2015–2018	ES Métlaoui		
2018–2020	US Tataouine		
- * Club domestic league appearances and goals

Foued Khrayfi (born 28 April 1991) is a retired Tunisian football striker.
