= Club Sportif de Makthar =

Tunisian football club

CS Makthar
- Full name: Club Sportif de Makthar
- Founded: 1942
- Ground: Stade de Makthar; Makthar, Tunisia
- Capacity: 5,000
- League: CLP-3
- 2007/08: 7th
| Home colours | Away colours |

Club Sportif de Makthar (Arabic: النادي الرياضي بمكثر, often referred to as ٍُCSMak ) is a Tunisian football club from Makthar founded in 1942.
