= Junior Karamoko =

Ivorian footballer

Personal information
- Full name: Mamadou Junior Karamoko
- Date of birth: 12 June 1994 (age 32)
- Position: Forward

Senior career*
Years	Team	Apps	(Gls)
2015	US Monastir		
2015	Stade Gabèsien		
2019	Horoya AC		
2019–?	FC San Pédro		
- * Club domestic league appearances and goals

Junior Karamoko (born 12 June 1994) is an Ivorian football striker.
