= Maetinga =

Municipality of Bahia, Brazil

- Municipality
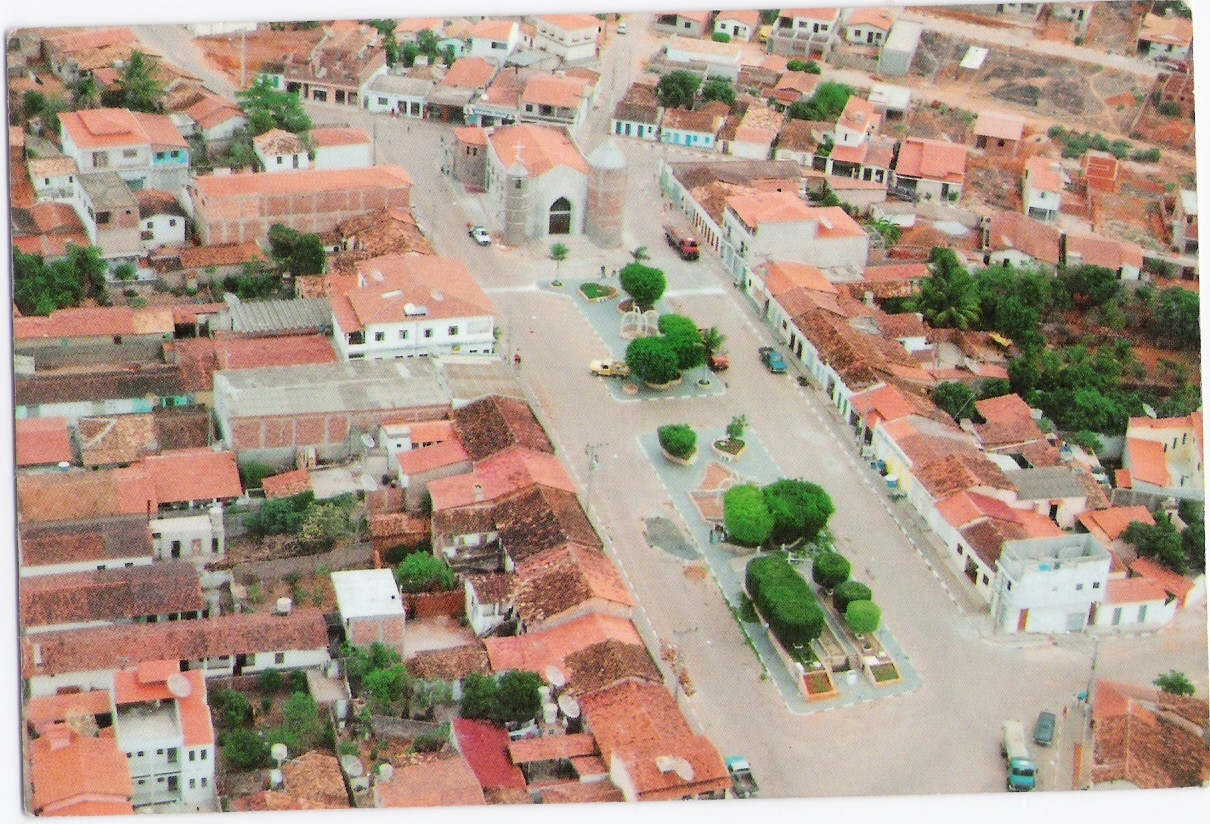

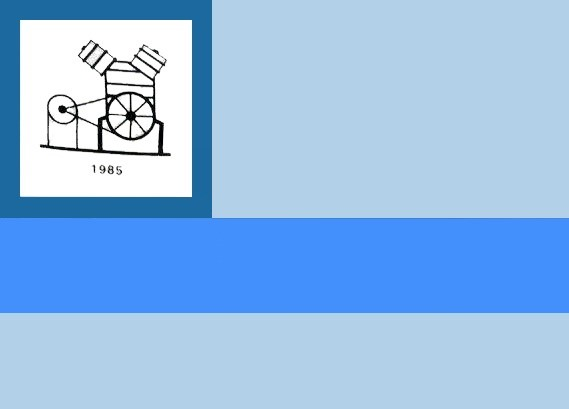
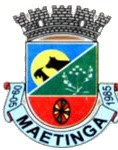
- Flag Coat of arms
- Interactive map of Maetinga
- Coordinates: 14°39′46″S 41°29′31″W
- Country: Brazil
- Region: Nordeste
- State: Bahia
- Mesoregion: Of south central Bahia Mesoregion
- Founded: May 9, 1985

Government
  - Mayor: Sergio Barros (AVANTE)

Area
  - Total: 614.834 km^{2} (237.389 sq mi)
- Elevation: 600 m (2,000 ft)

Population (2024 )
  - Total: 7,212
  - Density: 11.34/km^{2} (29.4/sq mi)
- Time zone: UTC−3 (BRT)

Maetinga is a municipality located in the interior of the state state of Bahia in the North-East region of Brazil. It is located approximately 609 kilometers from the state capital, Salvador.
According to data from the Brazilian Institute of Geography and Statistics (IBGE), in 2024 its population was estimated at 7,212 inhabitants.

== History ==
Maetinga was established through the separation from the municipality of Jânio Quadros, according to Bahia Estate Law No. 4446 of May 9, 1985. Its territory was first settled in 1876 due to the development of agriculture, livestock farming, and commerce.
In 1885, the founding family (João Francisco de Lima, his wife, and their 14 children) arrived at a farm known as Lagoa do Monte Alegre. They dedicated themselves to agriculture, livestock raising, and forest clearing. The family actively participated in religious festivities such as the Feast of Saint Anthony and Saint Rita, celebrated at the home of Joãozinho Matias and his wife.
In 1888, masses began to be held at the founder’s residence by Father João Gilberto. These religious celebrations continued until 1906, the year João Francisco de Lima died.

=== Toponym ===
Maetinga is of Tupi-Guarani origin and means: "mae" (hill/mountain) and "tinga" (joy), which reflects the meaning of the area's former name, Monte Alegre (Joyful Hill).

== See also ==
- List of municipalities in Bahia
