= Bengali Keïta =

Guinean footballer

Bangaly Keita
Personal information
- Date of birth: 1 May 1993 (age 33)
- Place of birth: Conakry, Guinea
- Height: 1.80 m (5 ft 11 in)
- Position: Centre back

Team information
- Current team: Futuro Kings
- Number: 25

Senior career*
Years	Team	Apps	(Gls)
2010–2013	Hafia		
2013–2016	Kairouan	48	(1)
2016–2017	Hassania Agadir	18	(0)
2017–2018	Free State Stars	35	(1)
2019	Chippa United	2	(0)
2019	Royal Eagles	1	(0)
2020–	Futuro Kings		

International career^{‡}
2011	Guinea	1	(0)
- * Club domestic league appearances and goals as of 14:34, 17 April 2026 (UTC) ‡ National team caps and goals as of 14:34, 17 April 2026 (UTC)

Bangaly Keita (born 1 May 1993) is a Guinean footballer who plays as a centre back for Equatorial Guinean club Futuro Kings FC. He has been a member of the Guinea national team.
