= Akrem Ben Sassi =

Tunisian footballer

Personal information
- Date of birth: 23 October 1984 (age 42)
- Height: 1.92 m (6 ft 4 in)
- Position: Defender

Senior career*
Years	Team	Apps	(Gls)
2008–2012	Olympique Béja		
2012–209	Stade Gabèsien		
- * Club domestic league appearances and goals

Akrem Ben Sassi (born 23 October 1984) is a Tunisian football defender. (Note: Akrem Ben Sassi at WorldFootball.net)
