= 2013–14 Tunisian Ligue Professionnelle 1 =

88th season of top-tier football in Tunisia

Tunisian Ligue Professionnelle 1
- Season: 2013–14
- Champions: Espérance de Tunis
- Relegated: Olympique Beja; LPS Tozeur; Grombalia Sports
- Champions League: Espérance de Tunis; CS Sfaxien
- Confederation Cup: Etoile Sahel; Club Africain
- Matches: 240
- Goals: 440 (1.83 per match)
- Top goalscorer: Bounedjah (14 goals)
- Biggest home win: EST 5-0 ST
- Biggest away win: ST 0-4 SG
- Highest scoring: LPST 5-1 GS

The 2013–14 Tunisian Ligue Professionnelle 1 (Tunisian Professional League) season was the 59th season of top-tier football in Tunisia. The competition began on 15 September 2013 and ended on May 13, 2014. The defending champions from the previous season were Club Sportif Sfaxien. In the 2013-14 league season, Club Africain drew the highest average home attendance with 9,000, followed by ES Tunis with 8,273.

== Results ==
=== League table ===
Pos	Team	Pld	W	D	L	GF	GA	GD	Pts	Qualification or relegation
1	Espérance de Tunis	30	19	9	2	48	15	+33	66	Qualification to the 2015 CAF Champions League
2	CS Sfaxien	30	17	6	7	36	20	+16	57	Qualification to the 2015 CAF Champions League
3	Étoile du Sahel	30	15	11	4	36	15	+21	56	Qualification to the 2015 CAF Confederation Cup (Note: Club Africain qualified to CAF Confederation Cup since the winners of the Tunisian Cup and the runners-up already qualified to African competitions after finishing in the 3rd and 2nd position respectively.)
4	Club Africain	30	15	9	6	29	20	+9	54	Qualification to the 2015 CAF Confederation Cup
5	AS Marsa	30	12	6	12	28	27	+1	42	
6	CA Bizertin	30	9	14	7	29	20	+9	41	
7	Stade Gabèsien	30	9	13	8	27	23	+4	40	
8	JS Kairouan	30	8	11	11	26	25	+1	35	
9	ES Métlaoui	30	7	14	9	21	26	−5	35	
10	US Monastir	30	9	7	14	28	32	−4	34	
11	CS Hammam-Lif	30	9	7	14	20	32	−12	34	
12	EGS Gafsa	30	9	7	14	25	39	−14	34	
13	Stade Tunisien	30	9	5	16	19	33	−14	32	
14	Olympique Béja	30	5	14	11	22	32	−10	29	Relegation to the 2014–15 Ligue 2
15	LPS Tozeur	30	6	11	13	23	35	−12	29	Relegation to the 2014–15 Ligue 2
16	Grombalia Sports	30	6	8	16	23	46	−23	26	Relegation to the 2014–15 Ligue 2

Source: Ligue 1
Rules for classification: 1) points; 2) goal difference; 3) number of goals scored.

=== Result table ===
Home \ Away	ASM	CA	CAB	CSHL	CSS	EGSG	EST	ESM	ESS	GS	JSK	LPST	OB	SG	ST	USM
AS Marsa	—	0–0	2–1	1–1	0–2	0–1	1–1	1–1	1–2	1–0	0–2	1–0	2–3	1–2	2–1	1–0
Club Africain	0–2	—	1–1	2–1	1–0	1–0	2–0	1–0	1–1	1–0	1–0	1–0	1–0	1–1	3–2	3–2
CA Bizertin	1–0	1–1	—	4–0	1–2	2–2	0–1	1–0	0–0	0–0	1–0	4–0	0–0	0–0	2–0	1–0
CS Hammam-Lif	0–2	0–0	0–0	—	0–1	1–0	1–0	1–0	0–1	1–2	1–0	1–1	2–1	1–0	2–0	1–1
CS Sfaxien	0–2	2–0	0–0	2–0	—	2–0	0–1	0–0	1–0	3–0	2–1	1–0	1–0	2–1	1–0	2–1
EGS Gafsa	1–0	1–0	2–2	0–2	1–2	—	0–2	0–0	0–0	3–3	2–1	1–2	2–1	1–0	2–1	1–0
ES Tunis	1–0	2–0	2–1	3–0	2–1	3–0	—	3–1	2–2	4–2	1–0	4–0	0–0	2–0	5–0	1–0
ES Métlaoui	2–1	1–1	2–2	1–0	0–0	0–0	1–2	—	0–1	1–0	1–0	1–1	1–1	1–1	1–0	1–0
Étoile du Sahel	0–0	1–0	1–0	4–1	1–2	2–1	0–0	1–1	—	3–0	1–1	1–0	3–1	0–0	0–0	3–0
Grombalia Sports	1–2	0–0	1–2	2–1	1–3	0–0	0–1	1–0	0–2	—	2–1	1–0	1–1	1–2	1–0	0–3
JS Kairouan	0–0	0–1	0–0	1–0	1–0	4–1	0–0	0–0	1–0	1–1	—	1–1	2–0	2–2	1–0	1–0
LPS Tozeur	0–2	1–1	1–2	0–0	2–1	1–0	1–1	1–1	0–0	5–1	1–1	—	0–0	2–0	1–0	0–1
Olympique Béja	2–0	0–2	0–0	1–0	1–0	1–2	0–0	1–1	1–2	1–1	1–1	1–1	—	1–1	0–1	2–1
Stade Gabèsien	0–1	1–0	0–0	1–0	0–0	2–1	1–1	2–0	0–1	1–0	1–1	3–1	1–1	—	0–0	0–0
Stade Tunisien	0–1	0–2	1–0	1–2	1–1	2–0	0–2	2–0	1–0	2–0	1–0	1–0	0–0	0–4	—	2–0
US Monastir	2–1	0–1	1–0	0–0	2–2	2–0	1–1	1–2	0–3	1–1	3–2	2–0	3–0	1–0	0–0	—

Source: Ligue 1
Legend: Blue = home team win; Yellow = draw; Red = away team win.

== Top scorers ==
Rank	Player	Club	Goals
1	(Algeria) Baghdad Bounedjah	Étoile du Sahel	14
2	(Tunisia) Nizar Issaoui	US Monastir	13
3	(Tunisia) Ahmed Akaïchi	Espérance de Tunis	11
4	(Tunisia) Nabil Missaoui	Olympique Béja	10
5	(Tunisia) Oussama Darragi	Espérance de Tunis	8
5	(Tunisia) Saif Jerbi	Grombalia Sports	8

== See also ==
- 2013–14 Tunisian Ligue Professionnelle 2
- 2013–14 Tunisian Cup
