= Hedi Bousarsar =

Tunisian volleyball player (born 1961)

Personal information
- Nationality: Tunisian
- Born: 6 August 1961 (age 63)

Sport
- Sport: Volleyball

Hedi Bousarsar (born 6 August 1961) is a Tunisian volleyball player. He competed in the men's tournament at the 1988 Summer Olympics.
