= Borhène Ghannem =

Tunisian footballer

Personal information
- Date of birth: 14 January 1987 (age 39)
- Place of birth: Kairouan, Tunisia
- Height: 1.80 m (5 ft 11 in)
- Position: Midfielder

Senior career*
Years	Team	Apps	(Gls)
2005–2009	Club Africain		
2009–2010	JS Kairouan		
2010–2011	Espérance de Tunis		
2011	JS Kairouan		
2011–2012	ES Beni-Khalled		
2012–2013	Stade Tunisien		
2014–2015	US Monastir		
2015–2016	EGS Gafsa		
2016–2017	JS Kairouan		
- * Club domestic league appearances and goals

Borhène Ghannem (born 14 January 1987) is a retired Tunisian football midfielder.
