= Wael Ben Romdhane =

Tunisian footballer

Personal information
- Date of birth: 12 December 1992 (age 33)
- Position: Midfielder

Senior career*
Years	Team	Apps	(Gls)
2014–2015	AS Djerba		
2012–2014	Stade Gabèsien		
2015–2017	AS Gabès		
- * Club domestic league appearances and goals

Wael Ben Romdhane (born 12 December 1992) is a retired Tunisian football midfielder. (Note: Wael Ben Romdhane at WorldFootball.net)
