= Bilel Yaken =

Tunisian footballer

Personal information
- Date of birth: 5 January 1981 (age 45)
- Height: 1.90 m (6 ft 3 in)
- Position: Defender

Senior career*
Years	Team	Apps	(Gls)
2006–2007	CA Bizertin		
2007–2009	Espérance de Tunis		
2009–2011	Stade Tunisien		
2012–2013	Olympique Béja		
2013–2014	ES Métlaoui		
2015	AS Gabès		
- * Club domestic league appearances and goals

Bilel Yaken (born 5 January 1981) is a retired Tunisian football defender.
