= Jendouba Municipal Stadium =

Sports venue in Jendouba, Tunisia

Coordinates: 36°29′39″N 8°46′56″E

- Interactive map of Jendouba Municipal Stadium
- Full name: Jendouba Municipal Stadium
- Location: Jendouba, Tunisia
- Capacity: 4,000
- Surface: Grass

Tenant
- Jendouba Sport

Jendouba Municipal Stadium is a multi-use stadium in Jendouba, Tunisia. It is used by football team Jendouba Sport. The stadium has a capacity of 4,000 people.
