= Houssem Bnina =

Tunisian footballer

Personal information
- Date of birth: 14 December 1994 (age 31)
- Height: 1.80 m (5 ft 11 in)
- Position: Defender

Team information
- Current team: Al-Entesar

Senior career*
Years	Team	Apps	(Gls)
2014–2018	JS Kairouan	80	(2)
2018–2021	Stade Tunisien	39	(0)
2021	US Tataouine	9	(0)
2022–	Al-Entesar		
- * Club domestic league appearances and goals

Houssem Bnina (born 14 December 1994) is a Tunisian football defender who plays for Saudi club Al-Entesar.
