= Slim Mhadhebi =

Tunisian footballer

Personal information
- Date of birth: 21 April 1994 (age 32)
- Height: 1.80 m (5 ft 11 in)
- Positions: Midfielder; winger

Senior career*
Years	Team	Apps	(Gls)
2009–2010	AS Kasserine		
2010–2011	ES Zarzis		
2011–2012	AS Gabès		
2012–2013	Olympique Béja		
2013–2014	ES Métlaoui		
2014–2017	JS Kairouan		
- * Club domestic league appearances and goals

Slim Mhadhebi (born 21 April 1994) is a Tunisian football midfielder.
