= Hedi Boukhris =

Tunisian footballer

Personal information
- Date of birth: 12 July 1986 (age 40)
- Position: Defender

Senior career*
Years	Team	Apps	(Gls)
2009–2010	ES Zarzis		
2010–2011	US Monastir		
2011–2012	EGS Gafsa		
2012–2013	CS Hammam-Lif		
- * Club domestic league appearances and goals

Hedi Boukhris (born 12 July 1986) is a retired Tunisian football defender.
