= Fakhreddine Galbi =

Tunisian footballer

Fakhi Galbi
Personal information
- Full name: Fakhreddine Galbi
- Date of birth: August 14, 1984 (age 42)
- Place of birth: Korba, Tunisia
- Height: 1.90 m (6 ft 3 in)
- Position: Striker

Team information
- Current team: US Ben Guerdane (manager)

Youth career
- 1999–2004: CS Korba

Senior career*
Years	Team	Apps	(Gls)
2004–2006	CS Korba	38	(27)
2006–2008	US Monastir	42	(23)
2008–2009	FC Vaduz	21	(13)
2009–2010	Stade Tunisien	19	(11)
2010–2011	CS Sfaxien	16	(07)
2011–2012	Al-Mokawloon Al-Arab	09	(04)
2012–2013	Stade Gabèsien	25	(16)
2013–2014	CA Bizertin		

International career^{‡}
2004–2006	Tunisia U-21	16	(09)
2006–	Tunisia	13	(05)
- * Club domestic league appearances and goals as of 13 May 2008 ‡ National team caps and goals as of 23 June 2006

Fakhreddine Galbi (born 14 August 1984, in Korba) is a Tunisian football (soccer) player who currently plays as a striker for CA Bizertin.

== Career ==
Galbi began his career in his hometown with CS Korba and was promoted 2004 to the senior side, before moved in summer 2006 to Union Sportive Monastir. On 26 August 2008 he moved from Union Sportive Monastir to Liechtenstein club FC Vaduz (playing in the Swiss league system) and signed a contract to 30 June 2010. After just one year was released from his contract with Vaduz and returned to Tunisia, signing for Stade Tunisien on 23 August 2009.

== International career ==
He has one cap for Tunisia and five youth games.
