= Jendouba Sport =

Tunisian football club

- Full name: Jendouba Sport
- Nickname: Diables rouges
- Founded: 1922
- Ground: Jendouba Municipal Stadium
- Capacity: 4,000
- Chairman: Samir Akermi
- League: Ligue 2
- 2023–24: Ligue 2, Group A, 2nd of 14
- Website: https://jendoubasport.net
Home colours	Away colours	Third colours

Jendouba Sport (Arabic: جندوبة الرياضية, known as JS for short, is a Tunisian football club based in Jendouba. The club was founded in 1922 as Association Sportive de Souk El-Arbâa and its colours are red and black. Their home stadium, Jendouba Municipal Stadium, has a capacity of 4,000 spectators. The club is currently playing in the Tunisian Ligue Professionnelle 2.

== History ==
The club was first promoted to the Premier League CLP-1 in 2005, Jendouba creates the surprise in its first match by winning the Esperance Sportive de Tunis at the first day of the championship (2 goals 0). Jendouba Sports does not, however, manage to stay in League I.

The club plays in League II during the 2006–2007 season.

In April 2007, after a victory against its immediate follower Olympique du Kef by scoring four goals to zero, the club finish second in the championship behind Stade Gabèsien. They therefore qualify for the League I with their new coach Adel Sellimi.

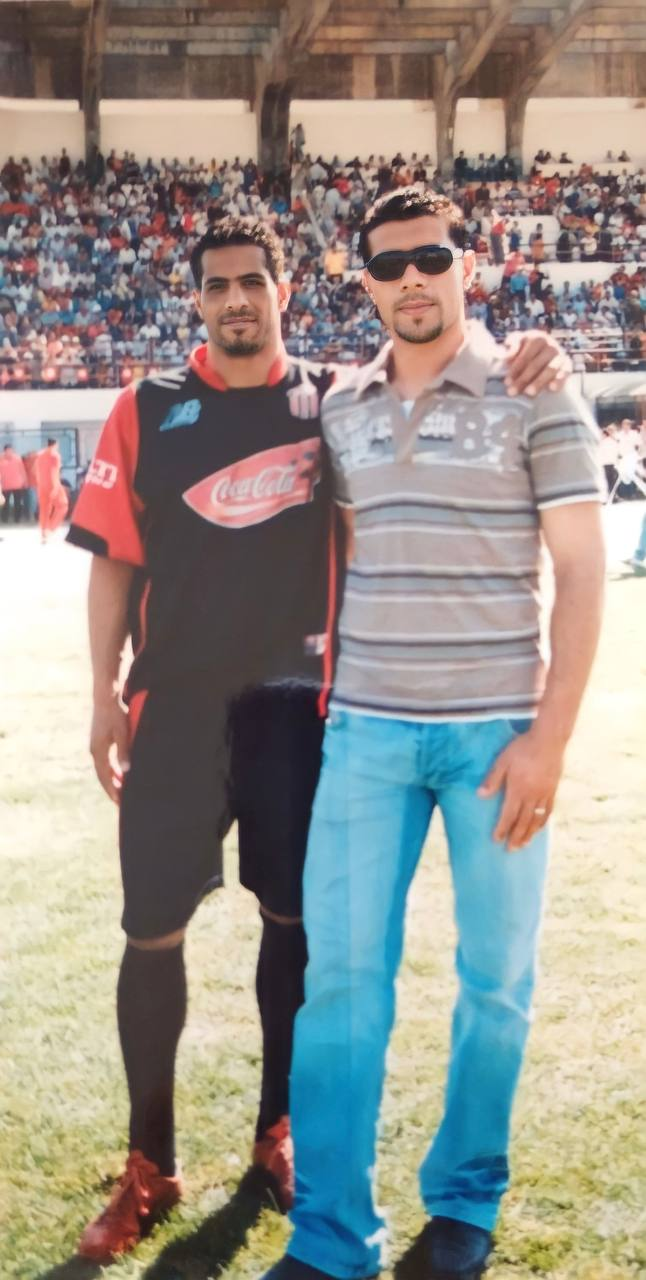
Ramzi Hermassi in the Tunisian team of Jendouba Sport in 2007

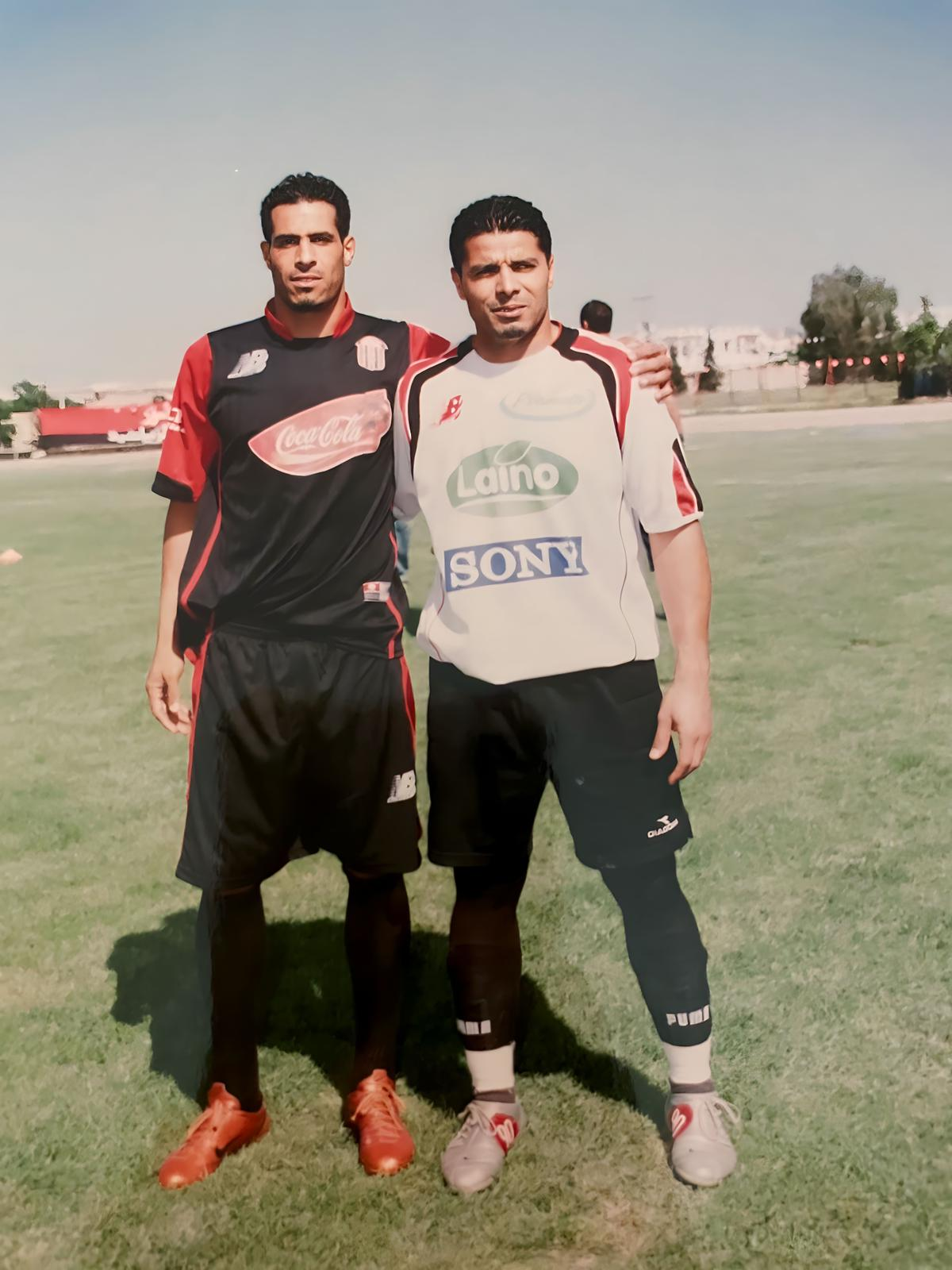
Ramzi Hermassi et le gardien Jendouba 2006

== Achievements ==
- Promoted from the CLP-2: 1

2006/07

== Selected former coaches ==
- (Tunisia) Mohammed Jelassi (2007–08)
