= 2017–18 Al-Fayha FC season =

Al-Fayha
2017–18 season
- Chairman: Saud Al-Shalhoub
- Manager: Constantin Gâlcă (until 1 November); Gustavo Costas (from 2 November)
- Stadium: King Salman Sport City Stadium
- Pro League: 8th
- King Cup: Quarter-finals
- Crown Prince Cup: Cancelled
- Top goalscorer: League: Ronnie Fernández (11 goals); All: Ronnie Fernández (13 goals)
- Highest home attendance: 2,278 vs Al-Ahli (24 February 2018)
- Lowest home attendance: 279 vs Al-Fateh (18 November 2017)
- Average home league attendance: 938
Home colours	Away colours	Third colours
- All statistics correct as of 12 April 2018.

The 2017–18 season was Al-Fayha's 64th year in existence and first season in the Pro League. This season Al-Fayha participated in the Pro League, King Cup and Crown Prince Cup.

The season covered the period from 1 July 2017 to 30 June 2018.

== Players ==
=== Current squad ===
As of 31 January 2018

Note: Flags indicate national team as defined under FIFA eligibility rules; some limited exceptions apply. Players may hold more than one non-FIFA nationality.

No.	Pos.	Nation	Player
1	GK	KSA	Moslem Al-Freej
2	DF	KSA	Mohammed Al-Baqawi (on loan from Al-Hilal)
3	DF	HON	Emilio Izaguirre
4	DF	KSA	Sami Al-Khaibari (captain)
6	MF	KSA	Dhaifallah Al-Qarni
9	FW	CHI	Ronnie Fernández
10	MF	KSA	Abdullah Al-Mutairi
11	FW	KSA	Abdullah Al-Salem
14	MF	KSA	Moataz Tombakti
15	MF	KSA	Abdulelah Al-Fahad
16	MF	KSA	Abdulrahman Al-Barakah
17	MF	KSA	Abdulkareem Al-Qahtani
18	MF	KSA	Hassan Jaafari
20	DF	CPV	Gegé
21	DF	YEM	Ahmed Andejani
22	GK	KSA	Fahad Al-Shammari
24	DF	KSA	Abdulaziz Al-Mansor
25	MF	KSA	Tawfiq Buhimed

No.	Pos.	Nation	Player
27	DF	KSA	Abdullah Kanno
29	MF	CRC	John Jairo Ruiz
31	MF	KSA	Abdulaziz Majrashi (on loan from Al-Ettifaq)
32	GK	KSA	Hamad Hawsawi
33	GK	KSA	Abdurahman Dagriri
39	DF	KSA	Ahmed Bamsaud (on loan from Al-Hilal)
42	MF	KSA	Hussain Al-Refaei
49	MF	KSA	Ahmed Al-Zain (on loan from Al-Ahli)
55	DF	KSA	Nawaf Al-Sobhi
70	MF	COL	Danilo Asprilla (on loan from Al-Ain)
77	MF	KSA	Mohammed Al-Muwallad
80	DF	KSA	Mukhair Al-Rashidi
85	MF	GRE	Alexandros Tziolis
88	MF	ARG	Jonathan Gómez (on loan from São Paulo)
90	FW	KSA	Nayef Abdali
99	FW	KSA	Fahad Al-Johani (on loan from Al-Qadsiah)
—	GK	KSA	Abdulquddus Atiah

=== Out on loan ===
Note: Flags indicate national team as defined under FIFA eligibility rules; some limited exceptions apply. Players may hold more than one non-FIFA nationality.

No.	Pos.	Nation	Player
8	MF	KSA	Abdulmajeed Al-Ruwaili (at Al-Taawoun until 30 June 2018)
13	DF	KSA	Hassan Muath (at Al-Shabab until 30 June 2018)
23	DF	KSA	Abdulaziz Majrashi (at Al-Fateh until 30 June 2018)

No.	Pos.	Nation	Player
44	DF	KSA	Hatem Belal (at Al-Qadsiah until 30 June 2018)
50	MF	KSA	Talal Majrashi (at Al-Ettifaq until 30 June 2018)
—	DF	KSA	Radhi Al-Mutairi (at Al-Kawkab FC until 30 June 2018)

== Transfers ==
=== In ===
Date	Pos.	Name	Previous club	Fee	Source
30 May 2017	MF	(Saudi Arabia) Dhaifallah Al-Qarni	(Saudi Arabia) Ohod	Undisclosed	
4 June 2017	GK	(Saudi Arabia) Moslem Al-Freej	(Saudi Arabia) Al-Khaleej	Undisclosed	
4 June 2017	MF	(Saudi Arabia) Talal Majrashi	(Saudi Arabia) Al-Khaleej	Undisclosed	
6 June 2017	DF	(Saudi Arabia) Abdullah Kanno	(Saudi Arabia) Al-Taawoun	Undisclosed	
6 June 2017	MF	(Saudi Arabia) Tawfiq Buhimed	(Saudi Arabia) Al-Fateh	Free	
9 June 2017	MF	(Saudi Arabia) Abdulmajeed Al-Ruwaili	(Saudi Arabia) Al-Hilal	Undisclosed	
10 June 2017	DF	(Saudi Arabia) Hatem Belal	(Saudi Arabia) Al-Wehda	Undisclosed	
14 June 2017	MF	(Saudi Arabia) Hassan Jaafari	(Saudi Arabia) Al-Qadsiah	Free	
14 June 2017	MF	(Saudi Arabia) Moataz Tombakti	(Saudi Arabia) Al-Ittihad	Free	
17 June 2017	FW	(Saudi Arabia) Abdullah Al-Salem	(Saudi Arabia) Al-Khaleej	Undisclosed	
20 June 2017	MF	(Saudi Arabia) Abdullah Al-Mutairi	(Saudi Arabia) Al-Faisaly	Free	
21 June 2017	GK	(Saudi Arabia) Hamad Hawsawi	(Saudi Arabia) Al-Ettifaq	Free	
24 June 2017	MF	(Saudi Arabia) Abdulrahman Al-Barakah	(Saudi Arabia) Al-Taawoun	Undisclosed	
9 July 2017	DF	(Cape Verde) Gegé	(Portugal) Paços Ferreira	€500,000	
9 July 2017	FW	(Chile) Ronnie Fernández	(Bolivia) Bolívar	€1,750,000	
13 July 2017	DF	(Saudi Arabia) Hassan Muath	(Saudi Arabia) Al-Shabab	Free	
24 July 2017	DF	(Honduras) Emilio Izaguirre	(Scotland) Celtic	€1,400,000	
28 July 2017	MF	(Greece) Alexandros Tziolis	(Scotland) Hearts	Free	
3 August 2017	GK	(Saudi Arabia) Fahad Al-Shammari	(Saudi Arabia) Al-Taawoun	Free	
5 August 2017	MF	(Saudi Arabia) Abdulkareem Al-Qahtani	(Saudi Arabia) Al-Hilal	Undisclosed	
9 August 2017	MF	(Costa Rica) John Jairo Ruiz	(Serbia) Red Star	Undisclosed	
10 January 2018	DF	(Yemen) Ahmed Andejani	Unattached	Free	
26 January 2018	GK	(Saudi Arabia) Abdulquddus Atiah	Unattached	Free	
2 February 2018	DF	(Saudi Arabia) Nawaf Al-Sobhi	(Saudi Arabia) Al-Qadsiah	Free	

=== Loans in ===
Date	Pos.	Name	Parent club	End date	Source
16 June 2017	DF	(Saudi Arabia) Mohammed Al-Baqawi	(Saudi Arabia) Al-Hilal	End of season	
19 June 2017	DF	(Saudi Arabia) Ahmed Bamsaud	(Saudi Arabia) Al-Hilal	End of season	
28 July 2017	MF	(Colombia) Danilo Asprilla	(United Arab Emirates) Al-Ain	30 June 2019	
22 January 2018	MF	(Argentina) Jonathan Gómez	(Brazil) São Paulo	31 December 2018	
29 January 2018	MF	(Saudi Arabia) Ahmed Al-Zain	(Saudi Arabia) Al-Ahli	End of season	
31 January 2018	MF	(Saudi Arabia) Abdulaziz Majrashi	(Saudi Arabia) Al-Ettifaq	End of season	
31 January 2018	FW	(Saudi Arabia) Fahad Al-Johani	(Saudi Arabia) Al-Qadsiah	End of season	

=== Out ===
Date	Pos.	Name	New club	Fee	Source
26 May 2017	MF	(Sudan) Saeed Mustafa	(Saudi Arabia) Al-Hazem	Free	
8 June 2017	DF	(Saudi Arabia) Saud Mekbesh	(Saudi Arabia) Al-Hazem	Undisclosed	
15 June 2017	DF	(Saudi Arabia) Tareq Abdulaziz	(Saudi Arabia) Al-Kawkab	Free	
15 June 2017	DF	(Saudi Arabia) Ahmed Al-Hafidh	Unattached	Released	
31 June 2017	DF	(Saudi Arabia) Foaad Al-Mahroos	(Saudi Arabia) Al-Adalh	Free	
31 June 2017	MF	(Saudi Arabia) Omar Al-Shammeri	Unattached	Released	
31 June 2017	FW	(Ivory Coast) Mechac Koffi	(India) Churchill Brothers	Free	
16 July 2017	GK	(Saudi Arabia) Fares Al-Shammeri	(Saudi Arabia) Al-Mujazzel	Free	
31 July 2017	DF	(Saudi Arabia) Ahmed Al-Sulami	(Saudi Arabia) Al-Ain	Free	
4 August 2017	GK	(Saudi Arabia) Ibrahim Al-Hafidh	Unattached	Released	
5 August 2017	MF	(Saudi Arabia) Ibrahim Al-Shehri	Unattached	Released	
7 August 2017	GK	(Saudi Arabia) Jaber Al-Gizani	(Saudi Arabia) Al-Sharq	Free	
11 August 2017	FW	(Saudi Arabia) Baker Fallatah	(Saudi Arabia) Al-Shoulla	Free	
13 August 2017	MF	(Saudi Arabia) Mohammed Al-Dahi	(Saudi Arabia) Al-Nahda	Free	
14 August 2017	DF	(Saudi Arabia) Khaled Al-Dubaisi	(Saudi Arabia) Al-Kawkab	Free	
29 August 2017	MF	(Saudi Arabia) Tarrad Abdullah	(Saudi Arabia) Jeddah	Free	
3 September 2017	MF	(Saudi Arabia) Abdullah Qaisi	(Saudi Arabia) Al-Shoulla	Free	
5 September 2017	FW	(Saudi Arabia) Mohammed Al-Menqash	(Saudi Arabia) Al-Shoulla	Free	
7 December 2017	FW	(Saudi Arabia) Mohammed Al-Bishi	(Saudi Arabia) Al-Hazem	Free	

=== Loans out ===
Date	Pos.	Name	Subsequent club	End date	Source
7 August 2017	DF	(Saudi Arabia) Radhi Al-Mutairi	(Saudi Arabia) Al-Kawkab	End of season	
21 January 2018	MF	(Saudi Arabia) Talal Majrashi	(Saudi Arabia) Al-Ettifaq	End of season	
27 January 2018	DF	(Saudi Arabia) Hassan Muath	(Saudi Arabia) Al-Shabab	End of season	
27 January 2018	DF	(Saudi Arabia) Hatem Belal	(Saudi Arabia) Al-Qadsiah	End of season	
30 January 2018	MF	(Saudi Arabia) Abdulmajeed Al-Ruwaili	(Saudi Arabia) Al-Taawoun	End of season	

== Competitions ==
=== Pre-season friendlies ===
12 July 2017 Friendly	Al-Fayha (Saudi Arabia)	0–4	(Germany) Mainz 05	Innsbruck, Austria
18:00 WET		Report

16 July 2017 Friendly	Al-Fayha (Saudi Arabia)	0–1	(Germany) Borussia Dortmund II	Innsbruck, Austria
18:00 WET		Report	47'

20 July 2017 Friendly	Al-Fayha (Saudi Arabia)	0–0	(Turkey) Bursaspor	Innsbruck, Austria
18:00 WET		Report		Stadium: Tivoli-Neu

22 July 2017 Friendly	Al-Fayha (Saudi Arabia)	2–2	(Turkey) Konyaspor	Waidring, Austria
18:00 WET	Buhimed 45'; Fernández 87'	Report	Hadžiahmetović 9'; Çamdalı 50'	Stadium: SK Waidring Stadium

27 July 2017 Friendly	Al-Fayha (Saudi Arabia)	0–3	(Greece) Asteras Tripolis	Salzburg, Austria
18:00 WET		Report	42'; 54'; 77' (pen.)

29 July 2017 Friendly	Al-Fayha (Saudi Arabia)	4–3	(Netherlands) Sparta Rotterdam	Salzburg, Austria
17:30 WET	Al-Bishi 35'; Al-Mutairi 49'; Al-Ruwaili 53'; Al-Khaibari 61'	Report	Pogba 14'; Brogno 45'; Alhaft 57'

6 August 2017 Friendly	Al-Fayha (Saudi Arabia)	1–1	(Saudi Arabia) Al-Raed	Al Zulfi, Saudi Arabia
19:00 AST	Majrashi 75'	Report	Bangoura 59'	Stadium: Al-Zulfi Club Stadium

26 August 2017 Friendly	Al-Fayha (Saudi Arabia)	2–3	(United Arab Emirates) Al Wahda	Innsbruck, Austria
17:00 WET	Fernández 18' (pen.), 52' (pen.)	Report	Tagliabué 27', 60'; Al-Akbari 49'

29 August 2017 Friendly	Al-Fayha (Saudi Arabia)	10–0	(Austria) SV Absam	Innsbruck, Austria
17:00 WET	Al-Mutairi; Al-Salem; Asprilla; Fernández; Gegé; Al-Bishi; Majrashi	Report

=== Pro League ===
==== League table ====
Pos	Team	Pld	W	D	L	GF	GA	GD	Pts	Qualification or relegation
6	Al-Faisaly	26	9	8	9	39	33	+6	35	
7	Al-Taawoun	26	9	7	10	43	36	+7	34 (Note: Al-Taawoun finished ahead of Al-Fayha on head-to-head points: Al-Fayha 1–1 Al-Taawoun, Al-Taawoun 4–0 Al-Fayha)	
8	Al-Fayha	26	8	10	8	36	40	−4	34	
9	Al-Ittihad	26	8	9	9	34	41	−7	33	Qualification to AFC Champions League group stage (Note: Al-Ittihad qualified for the AFC Champions League group stage as 2018 King Cup winners.)
10	Al-Shabab	26	8	7	11	36	36	0	31 (Note: Al-Shabab finished ahead of Al-Batin on overall goal difference: Al-Shabab 0, Al-Batin –11 (Al-Shabab 1–2 Al-Batin, Al-Batin 0–1 Al-Shabab).)	

Updated to match(es) played on 12 April 2018. Source: slstat.com
Rules for classification: 1) Points; 2) Head-to-head points; 3) Head-to-head goal difference; 4) Total goal difference; 5) Total goals scored; 6) Play-off (only for deciding champion, relegation and AFC competitions participation).

==== Results summary ====
Overall								Home						Away					
Pld	W	D	L	GF	GA	GD	Pts	W	D	L	GF	GA	GD	W	D	L	GF	GA	GD
26	8	10	8	36	40	−4	34	6	4	3	22	19	+3	2	6	5	14	21	−7

Last updated: 12 April 2018.
Source: Competitive matches

==== Results by round ====
Round	1	2	3	4	5	6	7	8	9	10	11	12	13	14	15	16	17	18	19	20	21	22	23	24	25	26
Ground	A	H	H	A	H	A	A	H	A	H	H	A	H	H	A	A	H	A	H	H	A	H	A	A	H	A
Result	L	L	D	D	W	L	D	L	D	L	W	L	W	W	W	L	W	W	D	W	D	D	L	D	D	D
Position	11	13	13	13	11	11	11	12	12	13	12	13	11	11	8	9	7	7	8	8	7	7	10	7	7	8

Updated to match(es) played on 10 March 2018. Source: Competitive matches
A = Away; H = Home; W = Win; D = Draw; L = Loss

==== Matches ====
All times are local, AST (UTC+3).

Win Draw Loss Postponed

10 August 2017 1	Al-Hilal	2–1	Al-Fayha	Riyadh
20:55	Otayf (yellow card) 26'; Al-Hafith 38'; Kharbin 78' (pen.); Al-Breik (yellow card) 87'	Report	Fernández (yellow card) 10', (goal) 31' (pen.); Muath (yellow card) 21'; Izaguirre (yellow card) 47'; Tziolis (yellow card) 51'; Al-Barakah (yellow card) 60'; Al-Qahtani (yellow card) 90+4'	Stadium: King Fahd International Stadium; Attendance: 9,765; Referee: Turki Al-Khudair

19 August 2017 2	Al-Fayha	2–5	Al-Ittihad	Al Majma'ah
20:50	Kanno (yellow card) 25'; Ruiz 35'; Fernández (yellow card) 43', (goal) 60'	Report	Gegé 30' (o.g.); Al-Najar (yellow card) 65'; Villanueva 71'; Khrees (yellow card) 79'; Kahraba 83'; Akaïchi 85'; Al-Muwallad 88' (pen.)	Stadium: King Salman Sport City Stadium; Attendance: 1,781; Referee: Sultan Al-Harbi

16 September 2017 3	Al-Fayha	1–1	Al-Taawoun	Al Majma'ah
18:40	Tziolis (yellow card) 37'; Tombakti (yellow card) 51'; Al-Khaibari (yellow card) 65'; Asprilla 65', (yellow card) 69'; Ruiz (yellow card) 86'; Al-Mutairi (yellow card) 90+1'	Report	Hazazi (yellow card) 45'; Amissi (yellow card) 69', (goal) 87'; Al-Zubaidi (yellow card) 86'	Stadium: King Salman Sport City Stadium; Attendance: 839; Referee: Faisal Al-Blwi

22 September 2017 4	Al-Nassr	2–2	Al-Fayha	Riyadh
20:20	Lagrou (yellow card) 19'; Al-Shehri 51'; Khamis (yellow card) 57'; Leonardo 62'	Report	Ruiz 19'; Fernández 58'	Stadium: Prince Faisal bin Fahd Stadium; Attendance: 3,014; Referee: Sultan Al-Harbi

29 September 2017 5	Al-Fayha	1–0	Ohod	Al Majma'ah
18:30	Tziolis (yellow card) 42'; Asprilla 56'	Report	Assiri (yellow card) 62'; Kassar (yellow card) 62'; Ronaldo (yellow card) 89'	Stadium: King Salman Sport City Stadium; Attendance: 930; Referee: Majed Al-Shamrani

14 October 2017 6	Al-Faisaly	2–1	Al-Fayha	Al Majma'ah
20:00	Hyland 41'; Abousaban 59', (yellow card) 75'; Al-Deayea (yellow card) 62'; Al-Dossari (yellow card) 64'; Al=Ghanam (yellow card) 73'	Report	Al-Khaibari (yellow card) 49'; Al-Shammari (yellow card) 51'; Fernández 90+1'	Stadium: King Salman Sport City Stadium; Attendance: 2,316; Referee: Sultan Al-Harbi

19 October 2017 7	Al-Qadsiah	1–1	Al-Fayha	Dammam
17:50	Fallatah 44'; Al-Obaid (yellow card) 72'	Report	Tombakti (yellow card) 45'; Al-Khaibari (yellow card) 47'; Fernández 58'; Kanno (yellow card) 83'	Stadium: Prince Mohamed bin Fahd Stadium; Attendance: 741; Referee: Fahad Al-Mirdasi

25 October 2017 8	Al-Fayha	1–2	Al-Ettifaq	Al Majma'ah
18:05	Al-Mutairi (yellow card) 51'; Al-Salem 70'	Report	Al-Khaibari 65', (yellow card) 90'; Callejón 72'	Stadium: King Salman Sport City Stadium; Attendance: 370; Referee: Mohammed Al-Hoaish

31 October 2017 9	Al-Ahli	1–1	Al-Fayha	Jeddah
19:45	Leonardo 44'; Al-Owais (yellow card) 90+4'	Report	Al-Baqaawi (yellow card) 41'; Gegé (yellow card) 58', (goal) 87'; Kanno (yellow card) 90+4'	Stadium: King Abdullah Sports City; Attendance: 9,774; Referee: Nikolaj Hänni (Switzerland)

18 November 2017 10	Al-Fayha	1–3	Al-Fateh	Al Majma'ah
17:50	Fernández 20' (pen.)	Report	Pedro 3'; Sakala 14', 60'; Sharahili (yellow card) 81'	Stadium: King Salman Sport City Stadium; Attendance: 279; Referee: Mark Clattenburg (England)

23 November 2017 11	Al-Fayha	3–1	Al-Shabab	Al Majma'ah
17:45	Fernández 30'; Ruiz (yellow card) 35'; Muath 47'; Tziolis 79'; Izaguirre (yellow card) 90'	Report	Al-Fahad (yellow card) 43'; Abdul-Amir (yellow card) 49'; Al-Shamrani 49'; Ghazi (yellow card) 77'; Benlamri (yellow card) 90'	Stadium: King Salman Sport City Stadium; Attendance: 402; Referee: Simon Lee Evans (Wales)

29 November 2017 12	Al-Raed	2–0	Al-Fayha	Buraidah
17:50	Otaif (yellow card) 52'; Bangoura 67'; Al-Sawadi 90+4'	Report	Al-Khaibari (yellow card) 27'	Stadium: King Abdullah Sport City Stadium; Attendance: 1,936; Referee: Stefan Johannesson (Sweden)

9 December 2017 13	Al-Fayha	2–0	Al-Batin	Al Majma'ah
15:10	Al-Salem 30'; Izaguirre (yellow card) 43'; Kanno (yellow card) 43'; Muath 74'	Report	Obaid (yellow card) 60'	Stadium: King Salman Sport City Stadium; Attendance: 364; Referee: Svein Oddvar Moen (Norway)

17 December 2017 14	Al-Fayha	2–1	Al-Hilal	Al Majma'ah
19:40	Fernández 51'; Asprilla 82', (yellow card) 90+2'; Ruiz (yellow card) 84'	Report	Al-Shahrani 63'; Darwish (yellow card) 71'	Stadium: King Salman Sport City Stadium; Attendance: 1,446; Referee: Cüneyt Çakır (Turkey)

24 December 2017 15	Al-Ittihad	0–1	Al-Fayha	Jeddah
19:45	Abdoh (yellow card) 59'; Bajandouh (yellow card) 64'	Report	Fernández (yellow card) 32'; Asprilla (yellow card) 45+2', (goal) 74'; Al-Baqawi (yellow card) 67'; Jaafari (yellow card) 83'; Al-Mutairi (yellow card) 84'	Stadium: King Abdullah Sports City; Attendance: 13,236; Referee: Turki Al-Khudair

29 December 2017 16	Al-Taawoun	4–0	Al-Fayha	Buraidah
15:20	Kamara 26'; Fathi 33', 55', 68'; El-Hadary (yellow card) 67'; Al-Bishi (yellow card) 71'; Al-Dossari (yellow card) 72'	Report	Buhimed (yellow card) 72'; Kanno (yellow card) 90'	Stadium: King Abdullah Sport City Stadium; Attendance: 4,740; Referee: Shukri Al-Hanfosh

11 January 2018 17	Al-Fayha	1–0	Al-Nassr	Al Majma'ah
20:00	Kanno 23'	Report	Ghaly (yellow card) 45+1'	Stadium: King Salman Sport City Stadium; Attendance: 1,368; Referee: Ismail Elfath (United States)

29 January 2018 19	Al-Fayha	2–2	Al-Faisaly	Al Majma'ah
20:10	Asprilla 24'; Kanno (yellow card) 25'; Jaafari (yellow card) 39'; Al-Khaibari (yellow card) 63'; Al-Robeai 77' (o.g.)	Report	Luisinho (yellow card) 61'; Rossi 84', 86'	Stadium: King Salman Sport City Stadium; Attendance: 1,403; Referee: Aleksei Eskov (referee) (Russia)

4 February 2018 20	Al-Fayha	2–0	Al-Qadsiah	Al Majma'ah
15:40	Fernández 4', 37'; Al-Baqawi (yellow card) 55'	Report	Al-Shoeil (yellow card) 10'; Hervé (yellow card) 35'; Fallatah (yellow card) 45+3'	Stadium: King Salman Sport City Stadium; Attendance: 486; Referee: Jarred Gillett (Australia)

10 February 2018 21	Al-Ettifaq	1–1	Al-Fayha	Dammam
20:20	Ben Youssef 25'; Al-Sonain (yellow card) 66'; Al-Kwikbi (yellow card) 90+2'	Report	Al-Khaibari (yellow card) 69'; Asprilla (yellow card) 78'; Fernández 90'	Stadium: Prince Mohamed bin Fahd Stadium; Attendance: 3,230; Referee: Mark Clattenburg (England)

16 February 2018 22	Al-Fayha	1–1	Al-Ahli	Al Majma'ah
18:35	Kanno (yellow card) 74'; Fernández (yellow card) 83'; Asprilla 85', (yellow card) 89'	Report	Milligan (yellow card) 43'; Fetfatzidis 79'; Claudemir (yellow card) 90+4' (yellow-red card) 90+5'	Stadium: King Salman Sport City Stadium; Attendance: 1,590; Referee: Ovidiu Hațegan (Romania)

3 March 2018 23	Al-Fateh	3–2	Al-Fayha	Al-Hasa
18:25	Pedro 19'; Al-Sobhi 38' (o.g.); Hazzazi 55' (pen.); Oueslati (yellow card) 89'	Report	Al-Sobhi 2'; Tziolis (yellow card) 54'; Gómez 61'; Al-Baqawi (yellow card) 69'; Al-Khaibari (yellow card) 75'	Stadium: Prince Abdullah bin Jalawi Stadium; Attendance: 1,831; Referee: Fahad Al-Mirdasi

6 March 2018 18	Ohod	2–3	Al-Fayha	Medina
19:10	Al-Khaldi 31'; Khoualed (yellow card) 39'; Essifi 50' (pen.); Ftayni (yellow card) 83'	Report	Tziolis 4'; Buhimed (yellow card) 38', (goal) 59'; Fernández 66'; Al-Baqawi (yellow card) 87'	Stadium: Prince Mohammed bin Abdul Aziz Stadium; Attendance: 3,336; Referee: Tim Marshall (Northern Ireland)

10 March 2018 24	Al-Shabab	0–0	Al-Fayha	Riyadh
20:30	Jaafer (yellow card) 36'; Abdul-Amir (yellow card) 79'; Salem (yellow card) 90+4'	Report	Al-Khaibari (yellow card) 42'; Al-Mutairi (yellow card) 44'	Stadium: Prince Faisal bin Fahd Stadium; Attendance: 1,440; Referee: Ivan Bebek (Croatia)

6 April 2018 25	Al-Fayha	3–3	Al-Raed	Al Majma'ah
20:40	Asprilla 40', 79', (yellow card) 58'; Fernández 48'; Dagriri (yellow card) 74'; Jaafari (yellow card) 88'; Al-Khaibari (yellow card) 90+4'	Report	Amora (yellow card) 43'; Shikabala 45+3'; Al-Rashidi (yellow card) 63'; Al-Shehri 70', 76', (yellow card) 74'; Al-Sawadi (yellow card) 90'	Stadium: King Salman Sport City Stadium; Attendance: 941; Referee: Ivan Bebek (Croatia)

12 April 2018 26	Al-Batin	1–1	Al-Fayha	Hafar al-Batin
19:00	Jhonnattann (yellow card) 31'; Jorge Silva (yellow card) 49', (goal) 62' (pen.); Al-Shammeri (yellow card) 60'	Report	Al-Johani 19'; Ruiz (yellow card) 24'; Al-Qarni (red card) 90+1'	Stadium: Al-Batin Club Stadium; Attendance: 832; Referee: Fahad Al-Mirdasi

=== King Cup ===
Al-Fayha will enter the King Cup in the Round of 32 alongside the other Pro League teams. All times are local, AST (UTC+3).

6 January 2018 Round of 32	Al-Qaisumah	2–3 (a.e.t.)	Al-Fayha	Hafar al-Batin
15:10	Al-Ruwailli (yellow card) 6'; Jowhar (yellow card) 60'; Al-Sahali 80'; Afana 87'	Report	Fernández (yellow card) 53', (goal) 62' (pen.), 107'; Al-Mutairi 86'; Asprilla (yellow card) 114'	Stadium: Al-Batin Club Stadium; Referee: Mishari Al-Mishari

24 January 2018 Round of 16	Al-Fayha	2–1 (a.e.t.)	Al-Fateh	Al-Majma'ah
15:35	Al Salem 11'; Al-Khaibari (yellow card) 111', (goal) 118'	Report	Sakala 56'; João Pedro (yellow card) 68'; Al-Fuhaid (yellow card) 90+3'	Stadium: King Salman Sport City Stadium; Attendance: 423; Referee: Mark Clattenburg (England)

24 February 2018 Quarter-finals	Al-Fayha	2–2 (a.e.t.) (3–4 p)	Al-Ahli	Al-Majma'ah
18:40	Gómez 21'; Izaguirre (yellow card) 50'; Fernández (yellow card) 53'; Jaafari (yellow card) 81'; Asprilla (yellow card) 93', (goal) 100'; Al-Sobhi (yellow card) 120+1'	Report	Balghaith (yellow card) 48' (yellow-red card) 112'; Bakshween (yellow card) 60'; Al-Amri 85'; Asiri 109'	Stadium: King Salman Sport City Stadium; Attendance: 2,278; Referee: Simon Lee Evans (Wales)
	Penalties
	Tziolis (penalty scored); Asprilla (penalty scored); Al-Mutairi (penalty missed); Al-Sobhi (penalty missed); Fernández (penalty scored); Izaguirre (penalty missed)		Fetfatzidis (penalty scored); Milligan (penalty missed); Al-Amri (penalty missed); Leonardo (penalty scored); Awagi (penalty scored); Ben Amor (penalty scored)

=== Crown Prince Cup ===
On 19 September 2017, it was announced that the tournament was cancelled. All times are local, AST (UTC+3).

9 September 2017 Round of 16	Al-Fayha	1–0	Al-Taawoun	Al Majma'ah
18:50	Asprilla 13'; Tombakti (yellow card) 28'; Al-Mutairi (yellow card) 51'	Report	Al-Mousa (yellow card) 52'; Al-Zubaidi (yellow card) 89'	Stadium: King Salman Sport City Stadium; Attendance: 791; Referee: Abdullah Al-Nuhait

== Statistics ==
=== Appearances ===
Last updated on 12 April 2018.

No.	Pos	Nat	Player	Total		Pro League		King Cup		Crown Prince Cup	
No.	Pos	Nat	Player	Apps	Goals	Apps	Goals	Apps	Goals	Apps	Goals
Goalkeepers
1	GK	(Saudi Arabia) KSA	Moslem Al-Freej	5	0	5	0	0	0	0	0
22	GK	(Saudi Arabia) KSA	Fahad Al-Shammari	8	0	7	0	0	0	1	0
32	GK	(Saudi Arabia) KSA	Hamad Hawsawi	0	0	0	0	0	0	0	0
33	GK	(Saudi Arabia) KSA	Abdurahman Dagriri	17	0	14	0	3	0	0	0
Defenders
2	DF	(Saudi Arabia) KSA	Mohammed Al-Baqawi	23	0	20	0	2	0	1	0
3	DF	(Honduras) HON	Emilio Izaguirre	28	0	22+2	0	3	0	0+1	0
4	DF	(Saudi Arabia) KSA	Sami Al-Khaibari	24	1	20	0	3	1	1	0
20	DF	(Cape Verde) CPV	Gegé	13	1	9+3	1	0	0	1	0
21	DF	(Yemen) YEM	Ahmed Andejani	0	0	0	0	0	0	0	0
27	DF	(Saudi Arabia) KSA	Abdullah Kanno	23	1	18+3	1	2	0	0	0
39	DF	(Saudi Arabia) KSA	Ahmed Bamsaud	6	0	3+2	0	0	0	1	0
55	DF	(Saudi Arabia) KSA	Nawaf Al-Sobhi	7	1	6	1	1	0	0	0
80	DF	(Saudi Arabia) KSA	Mukhair Al-Rashidi	2	0	0+1	0	1	0	0	0
Midfielders
6	MF	(Saudi Arabia) KSA	Dhaifallah Al-Qarni	10	0	6+2	0	1+1	0	0	0
10	MF	(Saudi Arabia) KSA	Abdullah Al-Mutairi	25	1	14+7	0	2+1	1	1	0
14	MF	(Saudi Arabia) KSA	Moataz Tombakti	9	0	4+4	0	0	0	1	0
15	MF	(Saudi Arabia) KSA	Abdulelah Al-Fahad	4	0	1+1	0	2	0	0	0
16	MF	(Saudi Arabia) KSA	Abdulrahman Al-Barakah	4	0	3	0	0+1	0	0	0
17	MF	(Saudi Arabia) KSA	Abdulkareem Al-Qahtani	11	0	5+5	0	0	0	1	0
18	MF	(Saudi Arabia) KSA	Hassan Jaafari	14	0	9+2	0	3	0	0	0
25	MF	(Saudi Arabia) KSA	Tawfiq Buhimed	10	1	5+3	1	2	0	0	0
29	MF	(Costa Rica) CRC	John Jairo Ruiz	15	2	11+4	2	0	0	0	0
31	MF	(Saudi Arabia) KSA	Abdulaziz Majrashi	0	0	0	0	0	0	0	0
42	MF	(Saudi Arabia) KSA	Hussain Al-Refaei	0	0	0	0	0	0	0	0
49	MF	(Saudi Arabia) KSA	Ahmed Al-Zain	4	0	1+2	0	0+1	0	0	0
70	MF	(Colombia) COL	Danilo Asprilla	27	10	17+6	8	1+2	1	1	1
77	MF	(Saudi Arabia) KSA	Mohammed Al-Muwallad	0	0	0	0	0	0	0	0
85	MF	(Greece) GRE	Alexandros Tziolis	29	2	23+2	2	1+2	0	0+1	0
88	MF	(Argentina) ARG	Jonathan Gómez	10	2	6+3	1	1	1	0	0
Forwards
9	FW	(Chile) CHI	Ronnie Fernández	29	15	25	13	2+1	2	0+1	0
11	FW	(Saudi Arabia) KSA	Abdullah Al-Salem	19	3	11+5	2	2	1	1	0
90	FW	(Saudi Arabia) KSA	Nayef Abdali	1	0	0+1	0	0	0	0	0
99	FW	(Saudi Arabia) KSA	Fahad Al-Johani	6	1	2+4	1	0	0	0	0
Players sent out on loan this season
8	MF	(Saudi Arabia) KSA	Abdulmajeed Al-Ruwaili	12	0	9+1	0	0+1	0	1	0
13	DF	(Saudi Arabia) KSA	Hassan Muath	12	2	10+2	2	0	0	0	0
44	DF	(Saudi Arabia) KSA	Hatem Belal	1	0	0+1	0	0	0	0	0
50	MF	(Saudi Arabia) KSA	Talal Majrashi	4	0	0+3	0	1	0	0	0

=== Goalscorers ===
Rank	No.	Pos	Nat	Name	Pro League	King Cup	Crown Prince Cup	Total
1	9	FW	(Chile)	Ronnie Fernández	13	2	0	15
2	70	MF	(Colombia)	Danilo Asprilla	8	1	1	10
3	11	FW	(Saudi Arabia)	Abdullah Al-Salem	2	1	0	3
4	13	DF	(Saudi Arabia)	Hassan Muath	2	0	0	2
4	29	MF	(Costa Rica)	John Jairo Ruiz	2	0	0	2
4	85	MF	(Greece)	Alexandros Tziolis	2	0	0	2
4	88	MF	(Argentina)	Jonathan Gómez	1	1	0	2
8	4	DF	(Saudi Arabia)	Sami Al-Khaibari	0	1	0	1
8	10	MF	(Saudi Arabia)	Abdullah Al-Mutairi	0	1	0	1
8	20	DF	(Cape Verde)	Gegé	1	0	0	1
8	25	MF	(Saudi Arabia)	Tawfiq Buhimed	1	0	0	1
8	27	DF	(Saudi Arabia)	Abdullah Kanno	1	0	0	1
8	55	DF	(Saudi Arabia)	Nawaf Al-Sobhi	1	0	0	1
8	99	FW	(Saudi Arabia)	Fahad Al-Johani	1	0	0	1
Own goal					1	0	0	1
Total					36	7	1	44

Last Updated: 12 April 2018

=== Clean sheets ===
Rank	No.	Pos	Nat	Name	Pro League	King Cup	Crown Prince Cup	Total
1	33	GK	(Saudi Arabia)	Abdulrahman Dagriri	5	0	0	5
2	22	GK	(Saudi Arabia)	Fahad Al-Shammari	1	0	1	2
Total					6	0	1	7

Last Updated: 10 March 2018
