= 2016–17 Al-Fayha FC season =

Al-Fayha
2016–17 season
- Chairman: Saud Al-Shalhoub
- Manager: Al Habeeb bin Ramadan
- Stadium: King Salman Sport City Stadium
- First Division: 1st
- King Cup: Round of 32
- Crown Prince Cup: Round of 32
- Top goalscorer: League: Mohammed Al-Menqash; Ali Khormi (7); All: Mohammed Al-Menqash; Ali Khormi (7)
Home colours	Away colours

The 2016–17 season was Al-Fayha's third consecutive season in the First Division and their 63rd year in existence. This season Al-Fayha participated in the First Division, King Cup and Crown Prince Cup.

Al-Fayha were promoted to the Professional League for the first time in their history beating fellow promotion chasers Ohod 2–1 on 29 April 2017.

The season covered the period from 1 July 2016 to 30 June 2017.

== First-team squad ==
As of 31 January 2017

Note: Flags indicate national team as defined under FIFA eligibility rules; some limited exceptions apply. Players may hold more than one non-FIFA nationality.

No.	Pos.	Nation	Player
1	GK	KSA	Fares Al-Shammeri
2	DF	KSA	Ahmed Al-Hafidh
3	DF	KSA	Abdulaziz Majrashi
4	DF	KSA	Sami Al-Khaibari
5	MF	KSA	Mohammed Al-Dahi
6	MF	SDN	Saeed Mustafa
7	FW	KSA	Mohammed Al-Bishi
8	MF	SDN	Suhaib Ezzaldeen
9	FW	CIV	Mechac Koffi
10	MF	KSA	Ibrahim Al-Shehri
11	MF	KSA	Radhi Al-Mutairi
13	DF	KSA	Foaad Al-Mahros
14	MF	KSA	Omar Al-Shammari
15	MF	KSA	Abdulelah Al-Fahad
17	FW	KSA	Mohammed Al-Menqash

No.	Pos.	Nation	Player
18	MF	KSA	Faisel Al-Johani (on loan from Al-Shabab)
19	MF	KSA	Abdullah Qaisi
20	FW	KSA	Baker Fallatah
21	DF	KSA	Ahmed Al-Sulami
22	GK	KSA	Ibrahim Al-Hafidh
23	DF	KSA	Saud Mekbesh
24	DF	KSA	Abdulaziz Al-Mansor
26	GK	KSA	Jaber Al-Jizani
33	GK	KSA	Abdurahman Dagriri
44	MF	KSA	Abdulkarim Al-Jaradah
55	DF	KSA	Khaled Al-Dubaisi (captain)
66	DF	KSA	Tareq Abdulaziz
90	MF	KSA	Tarrad Abdullah
99	FW	KSA	Ali Khormi (on loan from Al-Raed)

=== Out on loan ===
Note: Flags indicate national team as defined under FIFA eligibility rules; some limited exceptions apply. Players may hold more than one non-FIFA nationality.

No.	Pos.	Nation	Player
29	DF	SDN	Abbas Adam (at Al-Nahda until the end of the 2016–17 season)

== Transfers ==
=== In ===
Date	Pos.	Name	Previous club	Fee	Source
19 June 2016	FW	(Saudi Arabia) Baker Fallatah	(Saudi Arabia) Ohod	Free	
19 June 2016	GK	(Saudi Arabia) Ibrahim Al-Hafidh	(Saudi Arabia) Al-Tai	Free	
19 June 2016	DF	(Saudi Arabia) Ahmed Al-Hafidh	(Saudi Arabia) Al-Tai	Free	
19 June 2016	DF	(Saudi Arabia) Ahmed Al-Sulami	(Saudi Arabia) Al-Riyadh	Free	
24 June 2016	MF	(Saudi Arabia) Ibrahim Al-Shehri	(Saudi Arabia) Al-Tai	Free	
4 July 2016	MF	(Saudi Arabia) Sabah Jadoua	(Saudi Arabia) Al-Faisaly	Free	
11 July 2016	GK	(Saudi Arabia) Abdurahman Dagriri	(Saudi Arabia) Damac	Free	
3 August 2016	DF	(Saudi Arabia) Foaad Al-Mahros	(Saudi Arabia) Al-Nojoom	Free	
7 August 2016	FW	(Saudi Arabia) Mohammed Al-Menqash	(Saudi Arabia) Al-Mujazzel	Free	
12 August 2016	MF	(Saudi Arabia) Habeab Al-Ahmed	(Saudi Arabia) Al-Safa	Free	
12 August 2016	MF	(Saudi Arabia) Omar Al-Shammeri	(Saudi Arabia) Al-Faisaly	Free	
24 August 2016	GK	(Saudi Arabia) Fares Al-Shammeri	(Saudi Arabia) Al-Mujazzel	Free	
27 August 2016	FW	(Brazil) Pedrinho	(Malta) Balzan	Free	
5 September 2016	FW	(Niger) Mohammed Ishak	(Saudi Arabia) Al-Tai	Free	
5 September 2016	DF	(Saudi Arabia) Abdulaziz Al-Mansor	(Saudi Arabia) Al-Wehda	Free	
22 September 2016	DF	(Saudi Arabia) Abdulaziz Majrashi	(Saudi Arabia) Al-Raed	Free	
3 November 2016	MF	(Saudi Arabia) Abdullah Qaisi	(Saudi Arabia) Al-Wehda	Free	
21 January 2017	FW	(Ivory Coast) Mechac Koffi	(Oman) Al-Shabab	Undisclosed	

=== Loans in ===
Date	Pos.	Name	Parent club	End date	Source
11 June 2017	MF	(Saudi Arabia) Faisel Al-Johani	(Saudi Arabia) Al-Shabab	End of season	
14 January 2017	FW	(Saudi Arabia) Ali Khormi	(Saudi Arabia) Al-Raed	End of season	
27 January 2017	MF	(Sudan) Suhaib Ezzaldeen	(Sudan) Al-Hilal	End of season	

=== Out ===
Date	Pos.	Name	New club	Fee	Source
30 June 2016	MF	(Saudi Arabia) Hani Al-Dhahi	(Saudi Arabia) Hajer	Free	
18 July 2016	GK	(Saudi Arabia) Marwan Madou	(Saudi Arabia) Al-Shoulla	Free	
11 August 2016	MF	(Saudi Arabia) Akram Housah	(Saudi Arabia) Al-Jeel	Free	
30 August 2016	FW	(Saudi Arabia) Omar Al-Khodhari	(Saudi Arabia) Al-Nahda	Free	
1 September 2016	DF	(Saudi Arabia) Fahad Al-Yami	(Saudi Arabia) Al-Kawkab	Free	
3 September 2016	MF	(Saudi Arabia) Mohammed Al-Khamis	(Saudi Arabia) Al-Jeel	Free	
5 September 2016	MF	(Saudi Arabia) Karam Barnawi	(Saudi Arabia) Al-Kawkab	Free	
15 September 2016	MF	(Saudi Arabia) Abdulmajeed Al-Mutairi	(Saudi Arabia) Al-Riyadh	Free	
17 December 2016	FW	(Brazil) Pedrinho		Released	
18 January 2017	FW	(Niger) Mohammed Ishak		Released	
18 January 2017	MF	(Saudi Arabia) Habeab Al-Ahmed		Released	
24 January 2017	MF	(Saudi Arabia) Sabah Jadoua		Released	

=== Loans out ===
Date	Pos.	Name	Subsequent club	End date	Source
5 September 2016	DF	(Sudan) Abbas Adam	(Saudi Arabia) Al-Nahda	End of season	

== Competitions ==
=== Pre-season friendlies ===
21 July 2016 Friendly	Al-Fayha (Saudi Arabia)	1–0	(Saudi Arabia) Al-Raed	Turkey
16:00 AST	Abdullah 67'	Report

25 July 2016 Friendly	Al-Fayha (Saudi Arabia)	3–2	(Saudi Arabia) Al-Adalh	Turkey
16:00 AST		Report

26 July 2016 Friendly	Al-Fayha (Saudi Arabia)	1–3	(Turkey) Zugdidi	Turkey
17:00 AST		Report

4 August 2016 Friendly	Al-Fayha (Saudi Arabia)	1–0	(Saudi Arabia) Al-Qaisumah	Al Majma'ah
18:10 AST	Al-Shammeri 63'	Report		Stadium: King Salman Sport City Stadium

=== First Division ===
==== League table ====
Pos	Team	Pld	W	D	L	GF	GA	GD	Pts	Promotion, qualification or relegation
1	Al-Fayha (C, P)	30	13	11	6	50	35	+15	50	Promotion to Professional League
2	Ohod (P)	30	13	9	8	42	30	+12	48	Promotion to Professional League
3	Najran	30	13	7	10	38	34	+4	46	Qualification to promotion play-offs
4	Al-Nahda	30	12	9	9	37	31	+6	45	
5	Al-Orobah	30	10	11	9	34	32	+2	41	
6	Al-Qaisumah	30	11	8	11	44	50	−6	41	
7	Al-Shoulla	30	11	8	11	35	33	+2	41	
8	Damac	30	9	13	8	33	39	−6	40	
9	Hajer	30	10	10	10	38	36	+2	40	
10	Al-Hazem	30	10	8	12	36	30	+6	38	
11	Al-Watani	30	10	7	13	27	37	−10	37	
12	Al-Nojoom	30	8	13	9	38	37	+1	37	
13	Al-Tai	30	10	7	13	34	42	−8	37	
14	Al-Adalh (R)	30	8	12	10	31	41	−10	36	Relegation to Second Division
15	Al-Jeel (R)	30	8	11	11	45	45	0	35	Relegation to Second Division
16	Wej (R)	30	6	12	12	37	47	−10	30	Relegation to Second Division

Updated to match(es) played on 5 May 2017. Source: Goalzz
Rules for classification: 1) Points; 2) Head-to-head points; 3) Head-to-head goal difference; 4) Total goal difference; 5) Total goals scored; 6) Play-off (only for deciding champion, promotion and relegation).
(C) Champions; (P) Promoted; (R) Relegated

==== Results by matchday ====
Matchday	1	2	3	4	5	6	7	8	9	10	11	12	13	14	15	16	17	18	19	20	21	22	23	24	25	26	27	28	29	30
Ground	H	A	H	A	H	A	H	A	H	A	H	A	H	A	H	A	H	A	H	A	H	A	H	A	H	A	H	A	H	A
Result	W	D	D	L	D	L	L	D	W	W	L	W	W	D	W	W	W	D	D	W	D	L	D	W	W	L	W	D	W	D
Position	1	4	4	7	8	10	14	13	10	5	11	7	7	7	4	4	3	3	3	3	3	3	3	2	2	2	1	2	1	1

Updated to match(es) played on 5 May 2016. Source:
A = Away; H = Home; W = Win; D = Draw; L = Loss

==== Results summary ====
Overall								Home						Away					
Pld	W	D	L	GF	GA	GD	Pts	W	D	L	GF	GA	GD	W	D	L	GF	GA	GD
30	13	11	6	50	35	+15	50	8	5	2	29	17	+12	5	6	4	21	18	+3

Last updated: 5 May 2017.
Source: Kooora

==== Matches ====
13 August 2016 1	Al-Fayha	3–1	Al-Tai	Al Majma'ah
19:25 AST	Al-Shehri 19' (pen.); Al-Mutairi 45'; Al-Bishi 90+4'	Report	Al-Shammeri 90+2'	Stadium: King Salman Sport City Stadium; Referee: Qassem Al-Mohammed

20 August 2016 2	Al-Shoulla	2–2	Al-Fayha	Al-Kharj
19:00 AST	Al-Sudani 49', 80'	Report	Fallatah 2'; Al-Dahi 45+1'	Stadium: Al-Shoulla Club Stadium

19 September 2016 3	Al-Fayha	2–2	Al-Jeel	Al Majma'ah
18:40 AST	Al-Dahi 45'; Al-Mutairi 58'	Report	Adam 62', 73' (pen.)	Stadium: King Salman Sport City Stadium

24 September 2016 4	Damac	2–1	Al-Fayha	Abha
18:45 AST	Ilias 36'; Al-Aliany 61' (pen.)	Report	Al-Mutairi 30'	Stadium: Prince Sultan bin Abdul Aziz Stadium; Referee: Bandar Nahary

1 October 2016 5	Al-Fayha	1–1	Al-Orobah	Al Majma'ah
18:30 AST	Al-Johani 85' (o.g.)	Report	Al-Ruwaili 82'	Stadium: King Salman Sport City Stadium; Referee: Abdulrahman Al-Kaabi

14 October 2016 6	Al-Nahda	1–0	Al-Fayha	Dammam
18:10 AST	Al-Malki 88'	Report		Stadium: Prince Fahad bin Salman Stadium

20 October 2016 7	Al-Fayha	0–3	Hajer	Riyadh
15:25 AST		Report	Al-Jamaan 13'; Al-Khater 22'; Al-Thodan 90'	Stadium: Al-Hamadah Club Stadium

29 October 2016 8	Najran	1–1	Al-Fayha	Abha
18:20 AST	Salawati 38'	Report	Pedrinho 74' (pen.)	Stadium: Prince Sultan bin Abdul Aziz Stadium; Referee: Mohammed Al-Smail

5 November 2016 9	Al-Fayha	2–1	Al-Adalh	Al Majma'ah
15:15 AST	Al-Johani 20', 32'	Report	Al-Zowayed 75'	Stadium: King Salman Sport City Stadium; Referee: Abdullah Al-Owaydan

19 November 2016 10	Al-Qaisumah	0–2	Al-Fayha	Hafar al-Batin
15:05 AST		Report	Qaisi 43', 73'	Stadium: Al-Batin Club Stadium; Referee: Mishari Al-Asiri

26 November 2016 11	Al-Fayha	1–2	Al-Hazm	Al Majma'ah
15:10 AST	Al-Bishi 65'	Report	Al-Nemri 5', 43'	Stadium: King Salman Sport City Stadium

4 December 2016 12	Al-Nojoom	1–2	Al-Fayha	Al-Hasa
14:45 AST	Al-Enezi 89'	Report	Al-Bishi 41', 90+4'	Stadium: Prince Abdullah bin Jalawi Stadium; Referee: Bandar Nahary

9 December 2016 13	Al-Fayha	2–1	Al-Watani	Al Majma'ah
15:15 AST	Al-Mansor 85', 90+2' (pen.)	Report	Eisa 80'	Stadium: King Salman Sport City Stadium; Referee: Hussein Al-Sitri

17 December 2016 14	Ohod	0–0	Al-Fayha	Medina
15:40 AST		Report		Stadium: Prince Mohammed bin Abdul Aziz Stadium; Referee: Mohammed Al-Buraidi

23 December 2016 15	Al-Fayha	3–0	Wej	Al Majma'ah
15:15 AST	Qaisi 71'; Al-Menqash 83', 88'	Report		Stadium: King Salman Sport City Stadium; Referee: Haider Al-Sharid

31 December 2016 16	Al-Tai	2–3	Al-Fayha	Ha'il
15:20 AST	Al-Junaidi 33'; Al-Dossari 79'	Report	Al-Johani 5'; Al-Menqash 88'; Sami Al-Khaibari 90+1'	Stadium: Prince Abdul Aziz bin Musa'ed Stadium; Referee: Qassem Al-Mohammed

5 January 2017 17	Al-Fayha	3–1	Al-Shoulla	Al Majma'ah
15:25 AST	Qaisi 24'; Al-Menqash 73', 90+1'	Report	Al-Dossari 54'	Stadium: King Salman Sport City Stadium; Referee: Khaled Salwi

29 January 2017 18	Al-Jeel	1–1	Al-Fayha	Al-Hasa
15:20 AST	Al-Khamis 70'	Report	Al-Dossari 76' (o.g.)	Stadium: Prince Abdullah bin Jalawi Stadium; Referee: Raed Al-Zahrani

3 February 2017 19	Al-Fayha	1–1	Damac	Al Majma'ah
15:40 AST	Qaisi 9'	Report	Al-Aliany 23' (pen.)	Stadium: King Salman Sport City Stadium; Referee: Sami Al-Jires

11 February 2017 20	Al-Orobah	0–1	Al-Fayha	Sakakah
16:00 AST		Report	Al-Johani 35'	Stadium: Al-Orobah Club Stadium

18 February 2017 21	Al-Fayha	2–2	Al-Nahda	Al Majma'ah
15:50 AST	Al-Mansor 55'; Mustafa 90+4'	Report	Soumah 36'; Sufyani 67'	Stadium: King Salman Sport City Stadium

3 March 2017 22	Hajer	3–1	Al-Fayha	Al-Hasa
15:35 AST	Othman 4', 43'; Al-Aoufi 45+2'	Report	Al-Menqash 29' (pen.)	Stadium: Prince Abdullah bin Jalawi Stadium; Referee: Hussain Abu Shahin

11 March 2017 23	Al-Fayha	0–0	Najran	Al Majma'ah
15:55 AST		Report		Stadium: King Salman Sport City Stadium; Referee: Raed Al-Zahrani

18 March 2017 24	Al-Adalh	2–5	Al-Fayha	Al-Hasa
15:35 AST	Majrashi 63' (o.g.); Abdoh 81'	Report	Al-Johani 23' (pen.); Al-Menqash 26'; Khormi 44', 59'; Al-Bishi 57' (pen.)	Stadium: Prince Abdullah bin Jalawi Stadium; Referee: Fahad Al-Oraini

1 April 2017 25	Al-Fayha	5–0	Al-Qaisumah	Al Majma'ah
15:50 AST	Khormi 7', 30'; Al-Shamrani 40' (o.g.); Qaisi 81'; Koffi 86'	Report		Stadium: King Salman Sport City Stadium; Referee: Mohammed Al-Nuhait

8 April 2017 26	Al-Hazm	1–0	Al-Fayha	Ar Rass
16:00 AST	Kimani 2'	Report		Stadium: Al Hazm Club Stadium; Referee: Shukri Al-Hunfush

15 April 2017 27	Al-Fayha	2–1	Al-Nojoom	Al Majma'ah
15:50 AST	Khormi 61'; Koffi 84'	Report	Al-Aboud 11'	Stadium: King Salman Sport City Stadium; Referee: Abdulrahman Al-Sultan

21 April 2017 28	Al-Watani	1–1	Al-Fayha	Tabuk
16:20 AST	Eisa 52' (pen.)	Report	Mekbesh 77'	Stadium: King Khalid Sport City Stadium; Referee: Mohammed Al-Hoaish

29 April 2017 29	Al-Fayha	2–1	Ohod	Al Majma'ah
15:45 AST	Khormi 70', 90+6'	Report	Al-Qarni 82'	Stadium: King Salman Sport City Stadium; Referee: Shukri Al-Hunfush

5 May 2017 30	Wej	1–1	Al-Fayha	Ta'if
20:45 AST	Hussain 90+2'	Report	Al-Bishi 61'	Stadium: King Fahd Stadium; Referee: Hussein Abu Shahin

=== King Cup ===
21 January 2017 Round of 32	Al-Nassr	4–0	Al-Fayha	Riyadh
18:10 AST	Al-Ghamdi 15'; Tomečak 45+2'; Al-Najei 72'; Al-Sahlawi 90+1'	Report	Al-Khaibari (yellow card) 90'	Stadium: Prince Faisal bin Fahd Stadium; Referee: Raed Al-Zahrani

=== Crown Prince Cup ===
26 August 2016 Round of 32	Al-Fayha	0–2	Al-Raed	Al Majma'ah
20:55 AST	Al-Jaradah (yellow card) 45+1'; Al-Dubaisi (yellow card) 56'; Al-Hafidh (yellow card) 73'		Al-Bishi (yellow card) 17'; Adriano 57'; Bangoura 66'	Stadium: King Salman Sport City Stadium; Referee: Mohammed Al-Qarni

== Statistics ==
=== Appearances ===
Last updated on 5 May 2017.

No.	Pos	Nat	Player	Total		First Division		Crown Prince Cup		King Cup	
No.	Pos	Nat	Player	Apps	Goals	Apps	Goals	Apps	Goals	Apps	Goals
Goalkeepers
1	GK	(Saudi Arabia) KSA	Fares Al-Shammeri	3	0	3	0	0	0	0	0
22	GK	(Saudi Arabia) KSA	Ibrahim Al-Hafidh	0	0	0	0	0	0	0	0
26	GK	(Saudi Arabia) KSA	Jaber Al-Jizani	3	0	3	0	0	0	0	0
33	GK	(Saudi Arabia) KSA	Abdurahman Dagriri	26	0	24	0	1	0	1	0
Defenders
2	DF	(Saudi Arabia) KSA	Ahmed Al-Hafidh	17	0	13+3	0	1	0	0	0
3	DF	(Saudi Arabia) KSA	Abdulaziz Majrashi	24	0	20+3	0	0	0	1	0
4	DF	(Saudi Arabia) KSA	Sami Al-Khaibari	28	1	27	1	0	0	1	0
13	DF	(Saudi Arabia) KSA	Foaad Al-Mahros	10	0	7+2	0	1	0	0	0
21	DF	(Saudi Arabia) KSA	Ahmed Al-Sulami	5	0	4+1	0	0	0	0	0
23	DF	(Saudi Arabia) KSA	Saud Mekbesh	24	1	19+3	1	1	0	1	0
24	DF	(Saudi Arabia) KSA	Abdulaziz Al-Mansor	18	3	17	3	0	0	1	0
55	DF	(Saudi Arabia) KSA	Khaled Al-Dubaisi	19	0	15+2	0	1	0	1	0
66	DF	(Saudi Arabia) KSA	Tareq Abdulaziz	13	0	10+2	0	1	0	0	0
Midfielders
5	MF	(Saudi Arabia) KSA	Mohammed Al-Dahi	11	2	6+5	2	0	0	0	0
6	MF	(Sudan) SDN	Saeed Mustafa	31	1	29	1	1	0	1	0
8	MF	(Sudan) SDN	Suhaib Ezzaldeen	5	0	1+4	0	0	0	0	0
10	MF	(Saudi Arabia) KSA	Ibrahim Al-Shehri	10	1	5+5	1	0	0	0	0
11	MF	(Saudi Arabia) KSA	Radhi Al-Mutairi	19	3	13+4	3	1	0	0+1	0
14	MF	(Saudi Arabia) KSA	Omar Al-Shammari	2	0	1	0	0+1	0	0	0
15	MF	(Saudi Arabia) KSA	Abdulelah Al-Fahad	25	0	19+4	0	1	0	1	0
18	MF	(Saudi Arabia) KSA	Faisel Al-Johani	26	5	23+2	5	0	0	0+1	0
19	MF	(Saudi Arabia) KSA	Abdullah Qaisi	22	6	15+6	6	0	0	1	0
44	MF	(Saudi Arabia) KSA	Abdulkarim Al-Jaradah	5	0	2+2	0	1	0	0	0
90	MF	(Saudi Arabia) KSA	Tarrad Abdullah	3	0	1+1	0	0+1	0	0	0
Forwards
7	FW	(Saudi Arabia) KSA	Mohammed Al-Bishi	25	6	20+3	6	0+1	0	0+1	0
9	FW	(Ivory Coast) CIV	Mechac Koffi	12	2	2+10	2	0	0	0	0
17	FW	(Saudi Arabia) KSA	Mohammed Al-Menqash	22	7	13+7	7	1	0	1	0
20	FW	(Saudi Arabia) KSA	Baker Fallatah	7	1	4+3	1	0	0	0	0
99	FW	(Saudi Arabia) KSA	Ali Khormi	12	7	8+3	7	0	0	1	0
Player who made an appearance this season but have left the club
8	MF	(Saudi Arabia) KSA	Sabah Jadoua	2	0	0+2	0	0	0	0	0
9	FW	(Brazil) BRA	Pedrinho	8	1	5+3	1	0	0	0	0
14	FW	(Niger) NIG	Mohammed Ishak	5	0	0+5	0	0	0	0	0
90	MF	(Saudi Arabia) KSA	Habeab Al-Ahmed	1	0	0+1	0	0	0	0	0

=== Goalscorers ===
Rank	No.	Pos	Nat	Name	First Division	King Cup	Crown Prince Cup	Total
1	17	FW	(Saudi Arabia)	Mohammed Al-Menqash	7	0	0	7
1	99	FW	(Saudi Arabia)	Ali Khormi	7	0	0	7
3	7	FW	(Saudi Arabia)	Mohammed Al-Bishi	6	0	0	6
3	19	MF	(Saudi Arabia)	Abdullah Qaisi	6	0	0	6
5	18	MF	(Saudi Arabia)	Faisel Al-Johani	5	0	0	5
6	11	MF	(Saudi Arabia)	Radhi Al-Mutairi	3	0	0	3
6	24	DF	(Saudi Arabia)	Abdulaziz Al-Mansor	3	0	0	3
8	5	MF	(Saudi Arabia)	Mohammed Al-Dahi	2	0	0	2
8	9	FW	(Ivory Coast)	Mechac Koffi	2	0	0	2
10	4	DF	(Saudi Arabia)	Sami Al-Khaibari	1	0	0	1
10	6	MF	(Sudan)	Saeed Mustafa	1	0	0	1
10	9	FW	(Brazil)	Pedrinho	1	0	0	1
10	10	MF	(Saudi Arabia)	Ibrahim Al-Shehri	1	0	0	1
10	20	FW	(Saudi Arabia)	Baker Fallatah	1	0	0	1
10	23	DF	(Saudi Arabia)	Saud Mekbesh	1	0	0	1
Own goals					3	0	0	3
Total					50	0	0	50

Last Updated: 5 May 2017

=== Clean sheets ===
Rank	No.	Pos	Nat	Name	Pro League	King Cup	Crown Prince Cup	Total
1	33	GK	(Saudi Arabia)	Abdurahman Dagriri	6	0	0	6
Total					6	0	0	6

Last Updated: 5 May 2017
