= Abdullah Qaisi =

Saudi Arabian footballer

Personal information
- Full name: Abdullah Mohammed Qaisi
- Date of birth: May 8, 1990 (age 36)
- Place of birth: Al Jaradiyah, Saudi Arabia
- Height: 1.68 m (5 ft 6 in)
- Position: Winger

Team information
- Current team: Hetten
- Number: 17

Youth career
- Hetten

Senior career*
Years	Team	Apps	(Gls)
2010–2014	Hetten		
2014–2016	Al Wehda	24	(2)
2015–2016	→ Hajer (loan)	13	(0)
2016–2017	Al-Fayha	21	(6)
2017–2018	Al-Shoulla	30	(9)
2018–2019	Al-Tai	14	(0)
2019–2020	Abha	21	(0)
2020	Damac	0	(0)
2020–2021	Al-Shoulla	16	(0)
2021–2022	Al-Riyadh		
2022–	Hetten		
- * Club domestic league appearances and goals as of 9 September 2020

Abdullah Qaisi (Arabic: عبد الله قيسي; born May 8, 1990) is a Saudi Arabian professional footballer who plays as a midfielder for Hetten.

== Club career ==
Abdullah Qaisi joined Al Wehda from Hetten on 13 January 2014. He made his debut on 17 January 2014 in the league match against Al-Riyadh. He scored his first goal for the club on 31 January 2014 in the 3–0 away win against former club Hetten. He ended up making 13 appearances and scored three goals in his first season at Al-Wehda. In his second season, he made 12 league appearances as Al-Wehda earned promotion to the Pro League.

On 12 July 2015, Qaisi joined Pro League side Hajer on loan until the end of the season. He made his debut on 28 August 2015 in the 2–1 home loss against Al-Shabab. He made 14 appearances and did not score before returning to Al-Wehda following the conclusion of the season. On 3 November 2016, Qaisi joined First Division side Al-Fayha on a 18 month contract. He made his debut on 5 November 2016 by coming off the bench in the 83rd minute against Al-Adalah. On 19 November 2016, Qaisi made his first start for Al-Fayha and scored twice in the 2–0 win against Al-Qaisumah. He scored six goals in 21 appearances as Al-Fayha finished as winners of the 2016–17 First Division.

Following Al-Fayha's promotion to the Pro League, Qaisi was released by the club. On 4 September 2017, he joined First Division club Al-Shoulla on a one-year contract. On 26 May 2018, Qaisi joined Al-Tai. On 1 January 2019, he was released by the club. On 6 January 2019, Qaisi signed for Abha. Abha won the 2018–19 MS League title and earned promotion to the Pro League for the first time since 2009.

== Career statistics ==
=== Club ===
As of match played 9 September 2020

Club	Season	League			King Cup		Asia		Other		Total	
Club	Season	Division	Apps	Goals	Apps	Goals	Apps	Goals	Apps	Goals	Apps	Goals
Al-Wehda	2013–14	First Division	12	2	1	1	—		0	0	13	3
Al-Wehda	2014–15	First Division	12	0	1	0	—		1 (Note: Appearances in Crown Prince Cup)	0	14	0
Al-Wehda	Total		24	2	2	1	0	0	1	0	27	3
Hajer (loan)	2015–16	Pro League	13	0	1	0	—		0	0	14	0
Al-Fayha	2016–17	First Division	21	6	1	0	—		0	0	22	6
Al-Shoulla	2017–18	MS League	30	9	1	0	—		—		31	9
Al-Tai	2018–19	MS League	14	0	0	0	—		—		14	0
Abha	2018–19	MS League	12	0	3	0	—		—		15	0
Abha	2019–20	Pro League	9	0	2	0	—		—		11	0
Abha	Total		21	0	5	0	0	0	0	0	26	0
Damac	2020–21	Pro League	0	0	0	0	—		—		0	0
Career totals			123	17	10	1	0	0	1	0	134	18

== Honours ==
Al-Fayha

- First Division: 2016–17

Abha

- MS League: 2018–19
