= Sami Al-Khaibari =

Saudi Arabian footballer

Sami Al-Khaibari سامي الخيبري
Personal information
- Full name: Sami Mohammed Al-Khaibari
- Date of birth: September 18, 1989 (age 37)
- Place of birth: Dammam, Saudi Arabia
- Height: 1.85 m (6 ft 1 in)
- Position: Centre back

Youth career
- 2001–2009: Al-Ettifaq

Senior career*
Years	Team	Apps	(Gls)
2012–2025	Al-Fayha	243	(9)

International career^{‡}
2019–	Saudi Arabia	2	(0)
- * Club domestic league appearances and goals as of 16:32, 5 December 2023 (UTC) ‡ National team caps and goals as of 16:32, 10 August 2019 (UTC)

Sami Al-Khaibari (Arabic: سامي الخيبري; born 18 September 1989) is a Saudi Arabian professional footballer who plays as a centre back, where he is the club captain.

== Career ==
Al-Khaibari started his career at Al-Ettifaq and remained with the club until 2009. He left the club due to his employment in one of the military sectors. Al-Khaibari signed a semi-professional contract with Al-Fayha in 2012. During this period he also played for the Saudi Arabia national futsal team. During the 2013–14 season, Al-Khaibari helped Al-Fayha win the Second Division and earn promotion to the First Division. He signed his first professional contract with the club on 9 July 2015. During the 2016–17 season, Al-Khaibari helped Al-Fayha win the First Division and earn promotion to the Pro League for the first time in the club's history. Following the departure of club captain Khalid Al-Dubaisi, Al-Khaibari was named as captain ahead of Al-Fayha's debut season in the Pro League. On 1 February 2018, he renewed his contract with the club, tying him until 2021. On 31 October 2020, Al-Khaibari renewed his contract with the club until 2023. During the 2020–21 season, Al-Khaibari captained Al-Fayha to a second-placed finish in the MS League, thus earning promotion to the Pro League once again. On 19 May 2022, Al-Khaibari captained Al-Fayha in the King Cup final against Al-Hilal. Al-Fayha won 3–1 on penalties to win their first major honor. On 11 March 2023, Al-Khaibari renewed his contract with Al-Fayha.

== Career statistics ==
=== Club ===
As of match played 27 May 2024

Club	Season	League		King Cup		Crown Prince Cup		Asia		Other		Total	
Club	Season	Apps	Goals	Apps	Goals	Apps	Goals	Apps	Goals	Apps	Goals	Apps	Goals
Al-Fayha	2013–14	16	2	0	0	—		—		1 (Note: Appearance in King Cup qualifiers)	0	17	2
Al-Fayha	2014–15	22	0	0	0	1	0	—		—		23	0
Al-Fayha	2015–16	13	1	0	0	1	0	—		—		14	1
Al-Fayha	2016–17	27	1	1	0	0	0	—		—		28	1
Al-Fayha	2017–18	20	0	3	1	1	0	—		—		24	1
Al-Fayha	2018–19	27	0	1	0	—		—		—		28	0
Al-Fayha	2019–20	24	2	3	0	—		—		—		27	2
Al-Fayha	2020–21	27	1	—		—		—		—		27	1
Al-Fayha	2021–22	29	2	3	0	—		—		—		32	2
Al-Fayha	2022–23	30	0	1	0	—		—		2	0	33	0
Al-Fayha	2023–24	20	0	0	0	—		3	0	0	0	23	0
Total		255	9	12	1	3	0	3	0	3	0	276	10

== Honours ==
Al-Fayha

- Second Division: 2013–14
- MS League/First Division: 2016–17, runner-up 2020–21
- King Cup: 2021–22
