= Kafoumba =

Kafoumba is a given name. Notable people with the name include:

- Kafoumba Coulibaly (born 1985), Ivorian footballer
- Kafoumba Touré (born 1994), Malian footballer
