= Abdulaziz Majrashi =

Abdulaziz Majrashi may refer to:

- Abdulaziz Majrashi (footballer, born 1991), Saudi Arabian footballer
- Abdulaziz Majrashi (footballer, born 1996), Saudi Arabian footballer
