= Hassan Jaafari =

Saudi Arabian footballer

Personal information
- Full name: Hassan Eissa Jaafari
- Date of birth: July 27, 1991 (age 35)
- Place of birth: Saudi Arabia
- Height: 1.76 m (5 ft 9 1/2 in)
- Position: Midfielder

Team information
- Current team: Al-Kawkab
- Number: 18

Youth career
- Al-Qadsiah

Senior career*
Years	Team	Apps	(Gls)
2011–2017	Al-Qadsiah	53	(1)
2017–2021	Al-Fayha	45	(0)
2021–2024	Hajer	86	(1)
2024–2025	Al-Taraji		
2025–	Al-Kawkab		
- * Club domestic league appearances and goals as of 31 May 2022

Hassan Jaafari (Arabic: حسن جعفري, born 27 July 1991) is a Saudi Arabian football player who plays for Al-Kawkab as a midfielder.

== Honours ==
Al-Qadsiah

- First Division: 2014–15
