= Abdullah Kanno =

Saudi Arabian footballer

Personal information
- Full name: Abdullah Ibrahim Kanno
- Date of birth: March 6, 1990 (age 36)
- Place of birth: Khobar, Saudi Arabia
- Height: 1.76 m (5 ft 9 in)
- Position: Centre back

Team information
- Current team: Al-Hedaya
- Number: 3

Youth career
- Al-Qadsiah

Senior career*
Years	Team	Apps	(Gls)
2011–2015	Al-Qadsiah		
2015–2017	Al-Taawoun	14	(0)
2017–2020	Al-Fayha	37	(1)
2020–2021	Al-Kawkab	15	(0)
2021	Al-Hazem	1	(0)
2021–2022	Al-Safa		
2022	Al-Nahda	13	(0)
2022–2023	Al-Safa		
2023–	Al-Hedaya		
- * Club domestic league appearances and goals as of 31 May 2021

Abdullah Kanno (Arabic: عبدالله كنو; born 6 March 1990) is a Saudi professional footballer who plays for Al-Hedaya as a defender.

== Club career ==
=== Al-Taawoun ===
On 20 June 2015, Al-Taawoun signed Abdullah Kanno from Al-Qadisah with a three-year contract. On 8 May 2016, Abdullah played his debut against Al-Wehda, which they the match 2–1. On 4 May 2017, Abdullah played his last match for Al-Taawoun against Al-Ahli which they lost 2–1. On 6 June 2017, Al-Taawoun ended Abdullah's contract by mutual consent.

=== Al-Fayha ===
On 6 July 2017, Abdullah signed a three-year contract with newly promoted Al-Fayha. On 10 August 2017, Abdullah Kanno made his debut for Al-Fayha against Al-Hilal, which they lost 2–1.

== Hounors ==
=== Al-Qadisah ===
- Saudi First Division (1): 2014-15

=== Al-Hazem ===
- MS League: 2020–21
