= John Jairo Ruiz =

Costa Rican footballer (born 1994)

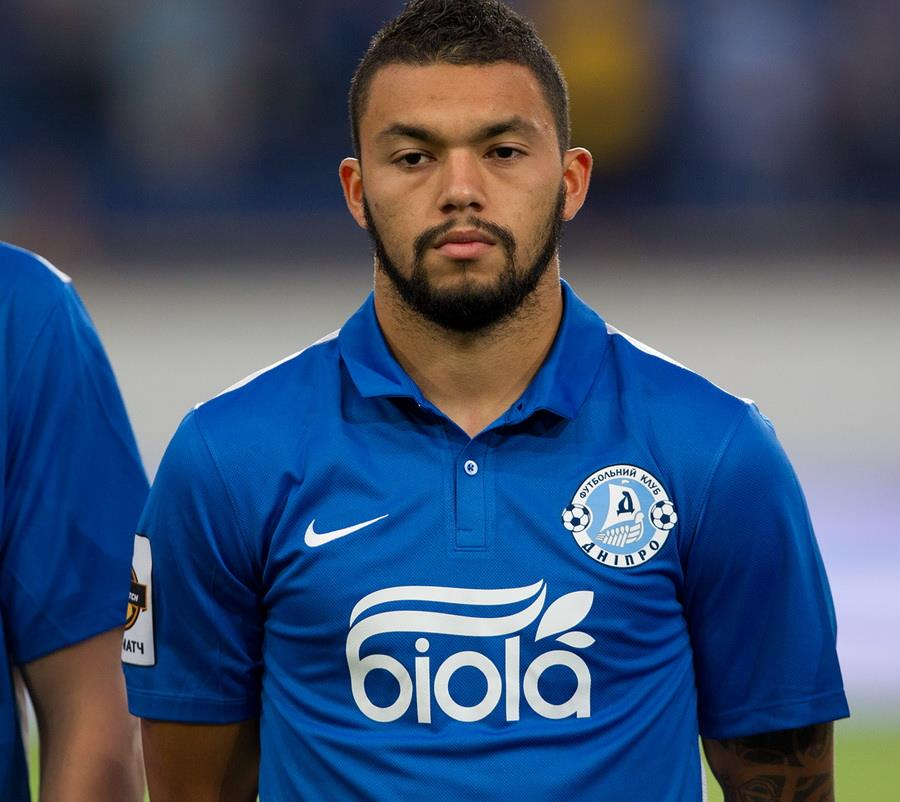
- Ruiz with Dnipro Dnipropetrovsk in 2015

Personal information
- Full name: John Jairo Ruiz Barrantes
- Date of birth: January 10, 1994 (age 32)
- Place of birth: Puntarenas, Costa Rica
- Height: 1.75 m (5 ft 9 in)
- Position: Winger

Team information
- Current team: Herediano
- Number: 94

Youth career
- Saprissa

Senior career*
Years	Team	Apps	(Gls)
2011–2012	Saprissa	11	(1)
2012–2016	Lille	8	(0)
2012–2014	Lille B	20	(8)
2012–2013	→ Mouscron-Péruwelz (loan)	24	(14)
2014–2015	→ Oostende (loan)	30	(6)
2015–2016	→ Dnipro Dnipropetrovsk (loan)	14	(6)
2016–2017	Red Star Belgrade	26	(6)
2017–2019	Al-Fayha	22	(2)
2019	Saprissa	14	(1)
2019–2020	Ironi Kiryat Shmona	7	(1)
2020–	Herediano	101	(16)

International career^{‡}
2010–2011	Costa Rica U17	5	(5)
2011–2013	Costa Rica U20	12	(4)
2015	Costa Rica U22	4	(0)
2011–2015	Costa Rica U23	4	(0)
2014–2020	Costa Rica	10	(1)
- * Club domestic league appearances and goals ‡ National team caps and goals as of 16 November 2023

John Jairo Ruiz Barrantes (born January 10, 1994) is a Costa Rican professional footballer who plays as winger for Liga FPD club Herediano.

== Club career ==
=== Saprissa ===
John Jairo began his career with C.D. Saprissa in 2011, scoring one goal against San Carlos on 11 September 2011. During the absence of Jairo Arrieta, Ruiz emerged as Saprissa's top striker in December 2011.

=== Lille ===
In January 2012, Ruiz signed a four-year contract with French side Lille OSC, and was playing with the reserve team until he was sidelined by injuries. In July 2012, Lille agreed a deal to send Ruiz to Belgian newly promoted Belgian Second Division team Royal Mouscron-Péruwelz on loan. After the 2013–14 season he spent playing with the first team and Lille II equally, Ruiz moved on new loan to Oostende, where he spent the whole 2014–15 season. On 25 August 2015, Ruiz was loaned to Ukrainian club Dnipro Dnipropetrovsk.

=== Red Star Belgrade ===
On June 28, 2016, Ruiz signed a three-year contract with Red Star Belgrade. He made his debut in an official match for Red Star on July 12, in the first leg of the second qualifying round of the 2016–17 UEFA Champions League in a game Red Star was playing against Valletta F.C. away. Red Star won 1–2, and Ruiz entered as a substitute of Aleksandar Katai in 83rd minute.

=== Al-Fayha ===
On August 9, 2017, Ruiz signed a three-year contract with Al-Fayha.

=== Return to Saprissa ===
In 2019, Ruiz returned to his boyhood club, Saprissa.

=== Ironi Kiryat Shmona ===
On 3 July 2019 Ruiz signed the Israeli Premier League club Ironi Kiryat Shmona.

=== Herediano ===
In January 2020 signed to Herediano.

== International career ==
Ruiz was selected in Costa Rica national team for the 2011 CONCACAF U-17 Championship and he was named in the 2011 CONCACAF U-20 Championship. He participated in the 2011 FIFA U-20 World Cup finals in Colombia, where he scored Costa Rica's first goal of the tournament. Ruiz earned his inaugural senior cap on 6 March 2014 in the 2:1 win over Paraguay in a friendly match after coming on as a second-half substitute for Bryan Ruiz.

After a solid start at the 2016–17 season with Red Star, Ruiz was one of the six legionnaires selected for the Costa Rica national team for the 2017 Copa Centroamericana.

== Career statistics ==
=== Club ===
As of 12 January 2019

Appearances and goals by club, season and competition
Club	Season	League			National cup		League cup		Continental		Other		Total	
Club	Season	Division	Apps	Goals	Apps	Goals	Apps	Goals	Apps	Goals	Apps	Goals	Apps	Goals
Saprissa	2011–12	Liga FPD	11	1	—		—		—		—		11	1
Lille	2011–12	Ligue 1	0	0	0	0	—		—		—		0	0
Lille	2012–13	Ligue 1	—		—		—		—		—		—	
Lille	2013–14	Ligue 1	8	0	2	0	1	0	—		—		11	0
Lille	2014–15	Ligue 1	—		—		—		—		—		—	
Lille	2015–16	Ligue 1	0	0	—		—		—		—		0	0
Lille	Total		8	0	2	0	1	0	—		—		11	0
Lille B	2011–12	CFA Group A	13	3	—		—		—		—		13	3
Lille B	2013–14	CFA Group A	7	5	—		—		—		—		7	5
Lille B	Total		20	8	—		—		—		—		20	8
Mouscron (loan)	2012–13	Belgian Division 2	24	14	1	1	—		—		5< (Note: Appearances in league play-offs)	4	30	19
Oostende (loan)	2014–15	Belgian Pro League	30	6	2	0	—		—		—		32	6
Dnipro (loan)	2015–16	Ukrainian Premier League	14	6	6	0	—		2	0	—		22	6
Red Star	2016–17	Serbian SuperLiga	26	6	1	0	—		6	0	—		33	6
Red Star	2017–18	Serbian SuperLiga	0	0	—		—		2	0	—		2	0
Red Star	Total		26	6	1	0	—		8	0	—		35	6
Al-Fayha	2017–18	Saudi Professional League	15	2	0	0	0	0	—		—		15	2
Al-Fayha	2018–19	Saudi Professional League	7	0	1	1	—		—		—		8	1
Al-Fayha	Total		22	2	1	1	0	0	—		—		23	3
Saprissa	2018–19	Liga FPD	14	1	0	0	0	0	1	0	—		15	1
Ironi Kiryat Shmona	2019–20	Israeli Premier League	7	1	0	0	3	0	0	0	—		10	1
Herediano	2019–20	Liga FPD	0	0	0	0	0	0	0	0	—		0	0
Career total			166	44	13	2	1	0	11	0	5	4	196	50

=== International ===
As of 16 November 2023

Appearances and goals by national team and year
National team	Year	Apps	Goals
Costa Rica	2014	3	1
Costa Rica	2015	1	0
Costa Rica	2016	0	0
Costa Rica	2017	4	0
Costa Rica	2020	2	0
Total		10	1

Scores and results list. Costa Rica's goal tally first.

Goal	Date	Venue	Opponent	Score	Result	Competition
1	10 October 2014	Sohar Regional Sports Complex, Sohar, Oman	Oman	2 – 1	4–3	Friendly
