= Gegé =

Cape Verdean footballer (born 1988)

Personal information
- Full name: Admilson Estaline Dias de Barros
- Date of birth: 24 February 1988 (age 38)
- Place of birth: Praia, Cape Verde
- Height: 1.84 m (6 ft 1/2 in)
- Position: Centre back

Senior career*
Years	Team	Apps	(Gls)
2007–2008	Boavista		
2008–2009	Sporting Pombal	26	(3)
2009–2010	Estrela Amadora	26	(0)
2010–2011	Trofense	14	(1)
2011–2012	Covilhã	22	(2)
2012–2014	Marítimo B	25	(1)
2013–2015	Marítimo	43	(0)
2015–2017	Arouca	29	(1)
2017	Paços Ferreira	14	(0)
2017–2020	Al-Fayha	58	(2)

International career^{‡}
2011–	Cape Verde	33	(2)
- * Club domestic league appearances and goals as of 24 August 2020 ‡ National team caps and goals as of 16 October 2018

Admilson Estaline Dias de Barros (born 24 February 1988), known as Gegé, is a Cape Verdean professional footballer who plays as a central defender.

He spent the vast majority of his professional career in Portugal, starting out at Estrela da Amadora.

== Club career ==
Gegé was born in Praia. He moved to Portugal in 2008, starting in the lower leagues with S.C. Pombal and C.F. Estrela da Amadora and moving to the second division in June 2010, signing for C.D. Trofense.

After one more season in the second level, with S.C. Covilhã, Gegé moved to the Primeira Liga with C.S. Marítimo, initially being assigned to the reserves in division three. He made his debut in Portugal's top flight with the Madeirans on 18 August 2013, coming on as a late substitute in a 2–1 home win against S.L. Benfica.

Gegé signed a two-year contract with F.C. Arouca on 27 August 2015. During his spell, he played 44 competitive games and scored three goals, two of those coming in the 2016–17 edition of the UEFA Europa League, against Heracles Almelo (1–1 away draw, qualification on the away goals rule) and Olympiacos FC (2–1 loss in Athens after extra time).

On 31 January 2017, Gegé joined F.C. Paços de Ferreira also of the top tier. He made his league debut three days later, in a 2–0 home victory over Vitória de Guimarães.

In the 2017 off-season, Gegé moved to the Saudi Professional League with Al-Fayha FC.

== International career ==
Gegé was called up to the Cape Verde national team for friendlies against Malta and Angola in September 2009, along three other under-21 internationals, but eventually did not play. He earned his first full cap the following year, featuring the full 90 minutes in a 2–1 defeat of Guinea-Bissau in Lisbon.

Gegé scored his first international goal on 31 March 2015, contributing to a 2–0 friendly victory in Portugal and being replaced at half-time. He was a participant at the 2013 and 2015 Africa Cup of Nations, contributing respectively two and three appearances as the nation exited in the quarter-finals and the group stage.

== Career statistics ==
=== Club ===
As of 17 May 2019

Club statistics
Club	Season	League			Cup		League Cup		Continental		Other		Total	
Club	Season	Division	Apps	Goals	Apps	Goals	Apps	Goals	Apps	Goals	Apps	Goals	Apps	Goals
Arouca	2015–16	Primeira Liga	21	1	0	0	3	0	—		—		24	1
Arouca	2016–17	Primeira Liga	8	0	0	0	1	0	3	1	—		12	1
Arouca	Total		29	1	0	0	4	0	3	1	0	0	36	2
Paços Ferreira	2016–17	Primeira Liga	14	0	0	0	0	0	—		0	0	14	0
Al-Fayha	2017–18	Pro League	12	1	0	0	1	0	—		—		13	1
Al-Fayha	2018–19	Pro League	22	0	0	0	—		—		—		22	0
Al-Fayha	Total		34	1	0	0	1	0	0	0	0	0	35	1
Career total			77	2	0	0	5	0	3	1	0	0	85	3

=== International ===
As of 16 October 2018

National team	Year	Apps	Goals
Cape Verde
Cape Verde	2010	1	0
Cape Verde	2011	5	0
Cape Verde	2012	4	0
Cape Verde	2013	6	0
Cape Verde	2014	3	0
Cape Verde	2015	4	1
Cape Verde	2016	2	0
Cape Verde	2017	2	1
Cape Verde	2018	2	0
Total		29	2

==== International goals ====
As of 28 March 2017 (Cape Verde score listed first, score column indicates score after each Gegé goal)

No.	Date	Venue	Opponent	Score	Result	Competition	Ref.
1	31 March 2015	António Coimbra da Mota, Estoril, Portugal	Portugal	2–0	2–0	Friendly	
2	28 March 2017	Alphonse Theis, Hesperange, Luxembourg	Luxembourg	1–0	2–0	Friendly	
