= Mohammed Al-Menqash =

Saudi Arabian footballer

Personal information
- Full name: Mohammed Abdullah Al-Menqash
- Date of birth: August 7, 1990 (age 36)
- Place of birth: Saudi Arabia
- Position: Forward

Team information
- Current team: Al-Sadd
- Number: 17

Youth career
- 2007–2010: Al-Ard

Senior career*
| Years | Team | Apps | (Gls) |
| 2010–2012 | Al-Faisaly | 2 | (0) |
| 2012–2016 | Al-Mujazzel | | |
| 2016–2019 | Al-Fayha | 22 | (7) |
| 2017–2018 | → Al-Shoulla (loan) | 28 | (5) |
| 2018–2019 | → Abha (loan) | 25 | (4) |
| 2019–2020 | Al-Nahda | | |
| 2020 | Al-Jeel | | |
| 2020–2021 | Al-Sahel | 31 | (3) |
| 2021–2023 | Al-Kholood | 24 | (5) |
| 2023 | Al-Shoulla | 9 | (0) |
| 2023–2024 | Al-Lewaa | | |
| 2024– | Al-Sadd | | |
- * Club domestic league appearances and goals as of 18 August 2019

Mohammed Al-Menqash (born 7 August 1990) is a Saudi football player who currently plays as a forward for Al-Sadd.

== Career ==
On 16 July 2023, Al-Menqash joined Al-Lewaa.

On 21 August 2024, Al-Menqash joined Al-Sadd.

== Honours ==
Al-Fayha

- First Division: 2016–17

Abha

- MS League: 2018–19
