= Peter Kolawole =

Nigerian footballer

Personal information
- Full name: Peter Kolawole
- Date of birth: 19 November 1990 (age 35)
- Place of birth: Nigeria
- Height: 1.77 m (5 ft 9 1/2 in)
- Position: Forward

Senior career*
Years	Team	Apps	(Gls)
2009–2011	Turan Tovuz	16	(5)
2010	→ Foggia (loan)	1	(0)
2013–2015	Nogoom El Mostakbal	?	(?)
2015	Aswan SC	3	(?)
2016	Al-Watani	?	(?)
2017	Damac	?	(0)
2017	Sloboda Užice	1	(0)
2018	Motema Pembe		
- * Club domestic league appearances and goals as of 22 October 2017

Peter Kolawole (born 19 November 1990) is a Nigerian football forward who most recently played for FK Sloboda Užice in the Serbian First League.

== Career ==
Kolawole played with Turan Tovuz in the Azerbaijan Premier League two seasons between 2009 and 2011.

He joined Nogoom El Mostakbal and played with them the seasons 2013–14 and 2014–15 of the Egyptian Second Division, finishing 5th and 6th respectively, thus failing to achieve promotion to Egyptian highest level. He then moved to Aswan SC and made 3 appearances during first half of the 2015–16 Egyptian Premier League.

Aswan was not doing well (they will avoid relegation just by one place at the end of the season), and Kalawole at mid season left Egypt and joined Saudi Arabian side Al-Watani. He played with Al-Watani in the second half of the 2015–16 Saudi First Division and first half of 2016–17 Saudi First Division. They were a mid–table club, finishing 10th and 11th respectively in each season. Kalawole during winter–break of 2016–17 moved to another Saudi club, Damac and finished 8th at the end of the season.

In summer 2017 Kolawale moved to Europe, and after a successful trial he joined Serbian second level historical side FK Sloboda Užice, who signed him along Benjamin Agyeman-Badu and Tinotenda Chibharo.

Kolawale played for Daring Club Motema Pembe in the club's 2018–19 CAF Confederation Cup campaign, scoring two goals in the preliminary round.
