= Tareq Abdulaziz =

Saudi Arabian footballer

Personal information
- Full name: Tareq Abdulaziz
- Date of birth: May 14, 1991 (age 35)
- Place of birth: Saudi Arabia
- Height: 1.78 m (5 ft 10 in)
- Position: Defender

Youth career
- Al-Wehda

Senior career*
Years	Team	Apps	(Gls)
2011–2016	Al-Wehda		
2016–2017	Al-Fayha	12	(0)
2017–2019	Al-Kawkab		
2019–2020	Al-Arabi		
2020–2022	Al-Entesar		
2022–2023	Al-Tuhami		
2023–2024	Al-Hareq		
- * Club domestic league appearances and goals as of 5 August 2017

Tareq Abdulaziz (Arabic: طارق عبد العزيز; born May 14, 1991) is a Saudi Arabian professional footballer who plays as a defender. He played for Al-Fayha during 2016–17 season, where he helped them win the title and promotion to the Pro League, before being released on June 15, 2017.

== Honours ==
Al-Fayha

- Saudi First Division: 2016–17
