= Abdulaziz Al-Mansor =

Saudi Arabian footballer

Personal information
- Full name: Abdulaziz Ibrahim Al-Mansor
- Date of birth: August 25, 1990 (age 36)
- Place of birth: Saudi Arabia
- Height: 1.76 m (5 ft 9 1/2 in)
- Position: Defender

Senior career*
Years	Team	Apps	(Gls)
2009–2016	Al-Wehda		
2016	→ Al-Ettifaq (loan)	12	(1)
2016–2019	Al-Fayha	17	(3)
2018–2019	→ Al-Kawkab (loan)		
2019	→ Al-Ain (loan)		
- * Club domestic league appearances and goals

Abdulaziz Ibraim Al-Mansor (born 25 August 1990) is a Saudi football player .

== Honours ==
Al-Ettifaq

- Saudi First Division: 2015–16

Al-Fayha

- Saudi First Division: 2016–17
