= Abdulrahman Dagriri =

Saudi Arabian professional footballer

Abdurahman Dagriri
Personal information
- Full name: Abdurahman Hussain Dagriri
- Date of birth: May 3, 1990 (age 36)
- Place of birth: Saudi Arabia
- Height: 1.82 m (6 ft 0 in)
- Position: Goalkeeper

Team information
- Current team: Neom
- Number: 33

Youth career
- 2005–2010: Hetten
- 2010–2012: Al-Ittihad

Senior career*
Years	Team	Apps	(Gls)
2012–2014	Al-Ittihad	0	(0)
2012–2014	→ Hetten (loan)		
2014–2015	Hajer	3	(0)
2015–2016	Damac	19	(0)
2016–2018	Al-Fayha	38	(0)
2018–2019	Al-Hazem	0	(0)
2019–2020	Hetten	0	(0)
2020–2023	Al-Shoulla	75	(0)
2023–	Neom	34	(0)
2025–2026	→ Al-Tai (loan)	23	(0)
- * Club domestic league appearances and goals as of 5 November 2026

Abdurahman Dagriri (Arabic: عبدالرحمن دغريري; born May 3, 1990) is a Saudi Arabian professional footballer who plays as a goalkeeper for Neom.

== Club career ==
Dagriri started out his career going through the youth ranks of Al-Ittihad and being promoted to the first team. He eventually left Al-Ittihad without making a single appearance, instead, he was loaned out to Hetten for 2 years. He joined Hajer and spent a year making just 3 appearances. During the summer of 2015, Dagriri joined Damac and spent a year before signing for Al-Fayha during the summer of 2016 where he currently is playing. He helped Al-Fayha win the 2017 First Division title and promotion to the Pro League.

On 17 July 2023, Dagriri joined Neom. On 10 September 2025, Dagriri joined Al-Tai on loan.

== Honours ==
Al-Fayha

- Saudi First Division: 2016–17

Neom

- Saudi First Division League: 2024–25
- Saudi Second Division League: 2023–24
