= Abdulelah Al-Fahad =

Saudi Arabian footballer

Fahad Albahoth
Personal information
- Full name: Fahad Albahoth
- Date of birth: June 10, 1992 (age 34)
- Place of birth: Saudi Arabia
- Height: 1.73 m (5 ft 8 in)
- Position: Midfielder

Youth career
- fahad-Albahoth

Senior career*
Years	Team	Apps	(Gls)
2012–2015	Albahoth	16	(0)
2015–2018	Al-Fayha		
2018–2019	Al-Shoalah	8	(0)
2019	Al-Washm	1	(0)
- * Club domestic league appearances and goals

Abdulelah Al-Fahad (Arabic: فهد على الباحوث) is a Saudi football player who plays as a midfielder.

== Honours ==
Al-Fayha

- Saudi First Division: 2016–17
