= 2014–15 Saudi First Division =

Saudi First Division
- Season: 2014–15
- Champions: Al-Qadisiyah (3rd title)
- Promoted: Al-Qadisiyah; Al-Wehda
- Relegated: Al-Safa; Abha; Hetten
- Matches: 240
- Goals: 635 (2.65 per match)
- Top goalscorer: Mousa Madkhali (20 goals)
- Biggest home win: Al-Nahda 5–0 Al-Safa (10 October 2014); Al-Batin 5–0 Abha (5 December 2014)
- Biggest away win: Al-Diriyah 0–6 Al-Qadisiyah (5 March 2015)
- Highest scoring: Al-Qadisiyah 6–2 Al-Feiha (30 August 2014); Al-Hazm 5–3 Al-Riyadh (7 November 2014)
- Longest winning run: 7 matches Al-Wehda
- Longest unbeaten run: 15 matches Al-Qadisiyah
- Longest winless run: 17 matches Hetten
- Longest losing run: 4 matches Abha; Al-Batin; Al-Feiha; Al-Safa

2014–15 Saudi First Division was the 38th season of Saudi First Division since its establishment in 1976. The season started on 15 August 2014 and concluded on 20 April 2015.

Both Al-Qadisiyah and Al-Wehda were promoted on the final day of the season. Al-Qadisiyah were crowned champions after a 2–0 away win against Al-Hazm while Al-Wehda were promoted following a 1–0 away win against Al-Batin. Al-Safa, Abha and Hetten were relegated to 2015–16 Saudi Second Division.

== Teams ==
The season featured 11 teams from the 2013–14 campaign, two new teams relegated from the 2013–14 Professional League, Al-Ettifaq and Al-Nahda, and three new teams promoted from the 2013–14 Saudi Second Division. Al-Feiha were promoted as champions, Al-Safa as runners-up and Al-Mojzel as the third-place play-offs winner.

== Team changes ==
The following teams have changed division since the 2014–15 season.

=== To the First Division ===
Promoted from the Second Division

- Al-Feiha
- Al-Safa
- Al-Mojzel

Relegated from the Pro League

- Al-Ettifaq
- Al-Nahda

=== From the First Division ===
Relegated to the Second Division

- Ohod
- Al-Ansar
- Al-Kawkb

Promoted to the Pro League

- Hajer
- Al-Khaleej

== Stadia and locations ==
Locations of teams in the 2014–15 Saudi First Division

Note: Table lists in alphabetical order.

Club	Location	Stadium
Abha	Abha	Prince Sultan bin Abdul Aziz Stadium
Al-Batin	Hafar al-Batin	Al-Batin Club Stadium
Al-Diriyah	Diriyah	Prince Turki bin Abdul Aziz Stadium
Al-Ettifaq	Dammam	Prince Mohamed bin Fahd Stadium
Al-Feiha	Al Majma'ah	Prince Salman Bin Abdulaziz Sport City Stadium
Al-Hazm	Ar Rass	Al Hazm Club Stadium
Al-Jeel	Al-Hasa	Prince Abdullah bin Jalawi Stadium
Al-Mojzel	Al Majma'ah	Prince Salman Bin Abdulaziz Sport City Stadium
Al-Nahda	Dammam	Prince Mohamed bin Fahd Stadium
Al-Qadisiyah	Al Khubar	Prince Saud bin Jalawi Stadium
Al-Riyadh	Riyadh	Prince Turki bin Abdul Aziz Stadium
Al-Safa	Safwa City	Al-Safa Club Stadium
Al-Tai	Ha'il	Prince Abdul Aziz bin Musa'ed Stadium
Al-Watani	Tabuk	King Khalid Sport City Stadium
Al-Wehda	Makkah	King Abdul Aziz Stadium
Hetten	Samtah	King Faisal Sport City Stadium

== League table ==
Pos	Team	Pld	W	D	L	GF	GA	GD	Pts	Promotion or relegation
1	Al-Qadisiyah (C)	30	19	6	5	49	20	+29	63	Promotion to Professional League
2	Al-Wehda	30	19	5	6	59	27	+32	62	Promotion to Professional League
3	Al-Nahda	30	18	7	5	50	31	+19	61	
4	Al-Ettifaq	30	16	6	8	50	31	+19	54	
5	Al-Tai	30	14	7	9	47	42	+5	49	
6	Al-Jeel	30	12	6	12	42	40	+2	42	
7	Al-Riyadh	30	10	10	10	41	44	−3	40	
8	Al-Watani	30	10	9	11	34	31	+3	39	
9	Al Hazm	30	9	12	9	42	42	0	39	
10	Al-Batin	30	10	6	14	37	34	+3	36	
11	Al-Feiha	30	9	7	14	30	42	−12	34	
12	Al-Mojzel	30	7	11	12	35	43	−8	32	
13	Al-Diriyah	30	7	9	14	29	54	−25	30	
14	Al-Safa (R)	30	7	8	15	29	46	−17	29	Relegation to 2015–16 Second Division
15	Abha (R)	30	5	10	15	36	56	−20	25	Relegation to 2015–16 Second Division
16	Hetten (R)	30	3	11	16	25	52	−27	20	Relegation to 2015–16 Second Division

Source: Thesaff.com (in Arabic)
Rules for classification: 1) Points; 2) Head-to-Head points; 3) Head-to-Head goal difference; 4) Head-to-Head goal scored; 5) Total goal difference; 6) Total goals scored; 7) play-off (only for deciding champion, promotion and relegation).
(C) Champions; (R) Relegated

== See also ==
- Saudi Pro League 2014–15
- Saudi King's Cup 2014–15
- Saudi Crown Prince Cup 2014–15
- Saudi Super Cup
