= Sabah Jadoua =

Saudi Arabian footballer

Personal information
- Full name: Sabah Jadoua Al-Enezi
- Date of birth: May 1, 1987 (age 39)
- Place of birth: Saudi Arabia
- Position: Midfielder

Senior career*
Years	Team	Apps	(Gls)
2007–2014	Al-Batin		
2014–2016	Al-Faisaly	12	(0)
2016	→ Al-Batin (loan)		
2016–2017	Al-Fayha	2	(0)
2017–2018	Al-Arabi		
2018–2020	Al-Ghottah		
- * Club domestic league appearances and goals

Sabah Jadoua Al-Enezi (Arabic: صباح جدوع العنزي; born May 1, 1987) is a Saudi football player who plays as a midfielder . He played in the Pro League for Al-Faisaly.
