= Abdullah Al-Mutairi =

Saudi Arabian footballer

Personal information
- Full name: Abdullah Al-Mutairi
- Date of birth: 1 July 1986 (age 40)
- Place of birth: Mecca, Saudi Arabia
- Height: 1.74 m (5 ft 8 1/2 in)
- Position: Midfielder

Senior career*
Years	Team	Apps	(Gls)
2007–2014	Al-Faisaly		
2008	→ Al-Wehda (loan)		
2014–2016	Al-Ahli	20	(0)
2016–2017	Al-Faisaly	19	(2)
2017–2020	Al-Fayha	35	(0)
- * Club domestic league appearances and goals

Abdullah Al-Mutairi (Arabic: عبد الله المطيري; born 1 July 1986) is a professional footballer who plays a midfielder .

== Career ==
Born in family living in Mecca, he spent the entire career representing various clubs in Saudi Arabia as a defending midfielder, scoring only two goals as he later fractured with an injury and retired in 2020.
