= Radhi Al-Mutairi =

Saudi Arabian footballer

Personal information
- Full name: Radhi Matar Al-Mutairi
- Date of birth: March 2, 1991 (age 35)
- Place of birth: Saudi Arabia
- Height: 1.74 m (5 ft 8 1/2 in)
- Position: Right-back

Team information
- Current team: Al-Eetemad

Youth career
- Al-Fayha

Senior career*
| Years | Team | Apps | (Gls) |
| 2009–2010 | Al-Fayha | | |
| 2010–2012 | Al-Shabab U21 | | |
| 2012–2015 | Al-Fayha | | |
| 2015–2016 | Hajer | 2 | (0) |
| 2016–2017 | Al-Fayha | 17 | (3) |
| 2017–2019 | Al-Kawkab | | |
| 2019–2021 | Al-Shoulla | 48 | (0) |
| 2021–2022 | Al-Bukiryah | | |
| 2023–2024 | Al-Sharq | | |
| 2024– | Al-Eetemad | | |
- * Club domestic league appearances and goals

Radhi Al-Mutairi (Arabic: راضي المطيري; born March 2, 1991) is a Saudi football player who plays a right-back for Al-Eetemad.

== Honours ==
Al-Fayha

- Saudi Second Division: 2013–14
- Saudi First Division: 2016–17
