= Ahmed Al-Sulami =

Saudi Arabian footballer

Personal information
- Full name: Ahmed Hulayel Al-Sulami
- Date of birth: August 11, 1983 (age 43)
- Place of birth: Saudi Arabia
- Height: 1.80 m (5 ft 11 in)
- Position: Full-back

Youth career
- Al-Ittihad

Senior career*
Years	Team	Apps	(Gls)
2007–2012	Damac		
2012	Abha		
2012–2014	Al-Wehda		
2014–2015	Al-Hazem		
2015–2016	Al-Riyadh		
2016–2017	Al-Fayha	5	(0)
2017–2018	Al-Ain		
2018–2019	Abha	34	(1)
2019–2021	Jeddah	55	(3)
2021–2023	Al-Entesar		
- * Club domestic league appearances and goals

Ahmed Al-Sulami (born 11 August 1983) is a Saudi football player who currently plays as a full-back.

== Honours ==
Al-Fayha

- Saudi First Division: 2016–17

Abha

- MS League: 2018–19
