= Mohammed Al-Dahi =

Saudi Arabian footballer

Personal information
- Full name: Mohammed Al-Dahi
- Date of birth: September 14, 1988 (age 38)
- Place of birth: Saudi Arabia
- Height: 1.75 m (5 ft 9 in)
- Position: Winger

Senior career*
Years	Team	Apps	(Gls)
2010–2012	Al-Taawoun	7	(0)
2012–2014	Al-Nahda		
2014–2015	Al-Wehda	1	(0)
2014–2015	→ Al-Khaleej (loan)	8	(0)
2015–2017	Al-Fayha		
2017–2018	Al-Nahda		
2019–2020	Al-Safa		
2020–2021	Al-Rawdhah		
- * Club domestic league appearances and goals

Mohammed Al-Dahi (born 14 September 1988) is a Saudi football player who plays as a winger and left back. He was part of Al-Fayha's squad which won the First Division title.

== Honours ==
Al-Fayha

- Saudi First Division: 2016–17
