= Abdulaziz Majrashi (footballer, born 1991) =

Saudi Arabian footballer

Personal information
- Full name: Abdulaziz Jaber Majrashi
- Date of birth: 21 July 1991 (age 35)
- Place of birth: Mecca, Saudi Arabia
- Height: 1.70 m (5 ft 7 in)
- Position: Right-back

Team information
- Current team: Al-Jandal
- Number: 33

Youth career
- Al-Wehda

Senior career*
Years	Team	Apps	(Gls)
2011–2015	Al-Wehda		
2015–2016	Al-Fayha	23	(0)
2016	Al-Raed	0	(0)
2016–2019	Al-Fayha	23	(0)
2017–2018	→ Al-Fateh (loan)	11	(0)
2018–2019	→ Al-Kawkab (loan)		
2019–2021	Al-Adalah	43	(0)
2021–2024	Al-Tai	55	(0)
2024–2025	Al-Diriyah	19	(0)
2025–	Al-Jandal	0	(0)
- * Club domestic league appearances and goals as of 28 May 2024

Abdulaziz Majrashi (Arabic: عبدالعزيز مجرشي; born 21 July 1991) is a Saudi Arabian professional footballer who plays as a right-back for Saudi First Division League side Al-Jandal.

== Club career ==
Majrashi began his career at Al-Wehda where he spent five seasons at the club. He earned promotion to the Pro League with the club during the 2011–12 season and the 2014–15 season. On 21 September 2015, Majrashi Al-Fayha on loan. On 5 July 2016, Majrashi joined Al-Raed on a free transfer. On 25 September 2016, Majrashi joined Al-Fayha on a permanent deal. He won the 2016–17 Saudi First Division and earned promotion to the Pro League with Al-Fayha. On 12 September 2017, Majrashi joined Al-Fateh on loan. On 23 August 2018, Majrashi joined Al-Kawkab on loan. On 28 August 2019, Majrashi was released from his contract by Al-Fayha. On the same day Majrashi joined Al-Adalah. On 28 June 2021, Majrashi joined newly promoted side Al-Tai on a two-year deal. On 20 July 2024, Majrashi joined Saudi Second Division League side Al-Diriyah. On 17 September 2025, Majrashi joined Al-Jandal.

== Honours ==
Al-Wehda

- First Division runner-up: 2011–12, 2014–15

Al-Fayha

- First Division: 2016–17

Al-Diriyah

- Saudi Second Division League: 2024–25
