= Baker Fallatah =

Saudi football player

Personal information
- Full name: Baker Omar Fallatah
- Date of birth: April 10, 1989 (age 37)
- Place of birth: Saudi Arabia
- Height: 1.78 m (5 ft 10 in)
- Position: Striker

Youth career
- Ohod

Senior career*
Years	Team	Apps	(Gls)
2009–2014	Al-Qadisiyah		
2012	→ Al-Hazm (loan)		
2014	→ Ohod (loan)		
2014–2015	Al-Safa		
2015	Al-Tadamon		
2015–2016	Ohod		
2016–2017	Al-Fayha	7	(1)
2017	Al-Shoulla		
2018	Najran		
2018–2019	Al-Watani		
2019–2020	Al-Majd		
2020	Al-Hejaz		
2020–2021	Al-Entesar		
2021–2022	Al-Dahab		
2022	Al-Ula		
- * Club domestic league appearances and goals

Baker Omar Fallatah (Arabic: بكر عمر فلاته; born April 10, 1989) is a Saudi football player who plays as a striker. He played in the Pro League for Al-Qadisiyah and Al-Hazm.
