= Pedrinho (footballer, born 1986) =

Brazilian footballer

Personal information
- Full name: Pedro Henrique dos Santos Calçado
- Date of birth: 4 August 1986 (age 40)
- Place of birth: Engenheiro Beltrão, Brazil
- Height: 1.74 m (5 ft 9 in)
- Position: Striker

Senior career*
Years	Team	Apps	(Gls)
2001–2003	Londrina		
2004–2005	Engenheiro Beltrão		
2006	Londrina		
2007	Adap Galo		
2007–2009	Msida St. Joseph		(14)
2009	Hapoel Rishon		
2009–2010	Sliema Wanderers		(1)
2010–2013	Balzan	40	(21)
2013	Police United	6	(2)
2013–2014	Balzan	12	(0)
2014	Mosta	10	(0)
2015	Sliema Wanderers	21	(8)
2016	Balzan	15	(4)
2016–2017	Al-Fayha	8	(1)
- * Club domestic league appearances and goals

Pedro Henrique dos Santos Calçado (born 4 August 1986), simply known as Pedrinho, is a Brazilian former professional footballer who plays as a striker.
