= Kafoumba Touré =

Malian footballer

Personal information
- Full name: Cheick Mohamed Kafoumba Touré
- Date of birth: 1 January 1994 (age 32)
- Place of birth: Mali
- Height: 1.83 m (6 ft 0 in)
- Position: Forward

Team information
- Current team: Tubize (on loan from Antwerp)
- Number: 13

Senior career*
Years	Team	Apps	(Gls)
2014–2016	AS Gabès	19	(5)
2015–2016	Stade Tunisien	14	(5)
2016–2017	Ohod	25	(17)
2017	Qadsia		
2017–	Antwerp	8	(0)
2019	→ Al-Washm (loan)	8	(0)
2019	→ Kawkab Marrakech (loan)	1	(0)
2019–	→ Tubize (loan)	13	(0)
- * Club domestic league appearances and goals as of 01:50, 12 February 2020 (UTC)

Cheick Mohamed Kafoumba Touré (born 1 January 1994) is a Malian professional footballer who plays for Belgian club A.F.C. Tubize on loan from Antwerp, as a forward.

Touré has played for AS Gabès, Stade Tunisien, Ohod, Qadsia and Antwerp.

== Career ==
Touré joined Antwerp in the summer 2017. However, he failed to impress, appearing only in two games. A year after his arrival, he was loaned out to Al-Washm Club and later to Kawkab Marrakech. In September 2019 he was loaned out again, this time to A.F.C. Tubize.
