= Hetten FC =

Association football club in Saudi Arabia

- Full name: Hetten Football Saudi Club
- Nicknames: The Maroon; Lion The South
- Founded: 1976
- Ground: King Faisal Sport City Stadium; Jizan, Saudi Arabia
- Capacity: 10,000
- Chairman: Faisal Madkhli
- Manager: Ahmad Qadari
- League: Second Division
- 2024-25: Saudi Second Division, 12th (Group B)
Home colours	Away colours

Hetten FC (Arabic: نادي حطين) is a Saudi Arabian professional football club based in Samtah. It was founded in 1976, and first named as Hottain Samtah.

== Current squad ==
As of Saudi Second Division:

Note: Flags indicate national team as defined under FIFA eligibility rules; some limited exceptions apply. Players may hold more than one non-FIFA nationality.

No.	Pos.	Nation	Player
1	GK	KSA	Naif Al-Bedidi
5	DF	KSA	Yasser Dhamri
8	MF	NAM	Willy Stephanus
9	FW	KSA	Rayan Al-Johani
10	MF	KSA	Hassan Jaeam
13	DF	KSA	Alyazeed Hassan
16	DF	KSA	Hassan Faqihi
17	MF	KSA	Abdullah Qaisi
18	FW	KSA	Muhannad Abo Reezah
20	DF	KSA	Abdulrahman Al-Nashili
21	DF	KSA	Yahya Daghriri
22	GK	KSA	Khaled Hakami
23	DF	KSA	Saud Mekbesh
24	DF	KSA	Wajdi Al-Dhobyani
33	GK	KSA	Ali Arishi

No.	Pos.	Nation	Player
34	DF	KSA	Waleed Somaili
44	FW	GHA	Mubarak Alhassan
50	MF	RWA	Ally Niyonzima
66	MF	KSA	Hussain Al-Takrouni
69	DF	KSA	Abdulaziz Hamel
70	FW	KSA	Abdullah Arishi
78	DF	BRA	Ramon
92	FW	KSA	Abdulaziz Al-Shahrani
—	GK	KSA	Abdullah Al-Arraf
—	MF	BRA	Alyson Romeu
—	FW	MLI	Amara Bagayoko
—	FW	MAD	Carolus Andria

== See also ==
- List of football clubs in Saudi Arabia
