= Saeed Mustafa =

Sudanese footballer

Personal information
- Full name: Saeed Mustafa Balla
- Date of birth: November 30, 1985 (age 40)
- Place of birth: Mecca, Saudi Arabia
- Position: Midfielder

Senior career*
Years	Team	Apps	(Gls)
2004–2014	Al-Merrikh		
2014–2016	Al-Ahly Shendi	0	(0)
2016–2017	Al-Fayha	29	(1)
2017–2018	Al Hazem	29	(2)
2019	Damac	15	(0)

International career
2007–2015	Sudan	16	(0)
- * Club domestic league appearances and goals as of 16 May 2019

Saeed Mustafa (Arabic: سعيد مصطفى; born 1 January 1986), also known as Saeed al-Saudi, is a Sudanese international footballer who plays as midfielder .

Mustafa plays club football. He scored his first goal for Al-Merreikh in the 50th minute against Al Riffa of Bahrain in the Arab Champions League, which El-Merreikh won 1:3 in Manama.

Mustafa is a member of the Sudan national football team.
