= Majmaah =

Governorate in Riyadh Province, Saudi Arabia

Majmaah المجمعة
- Governorate
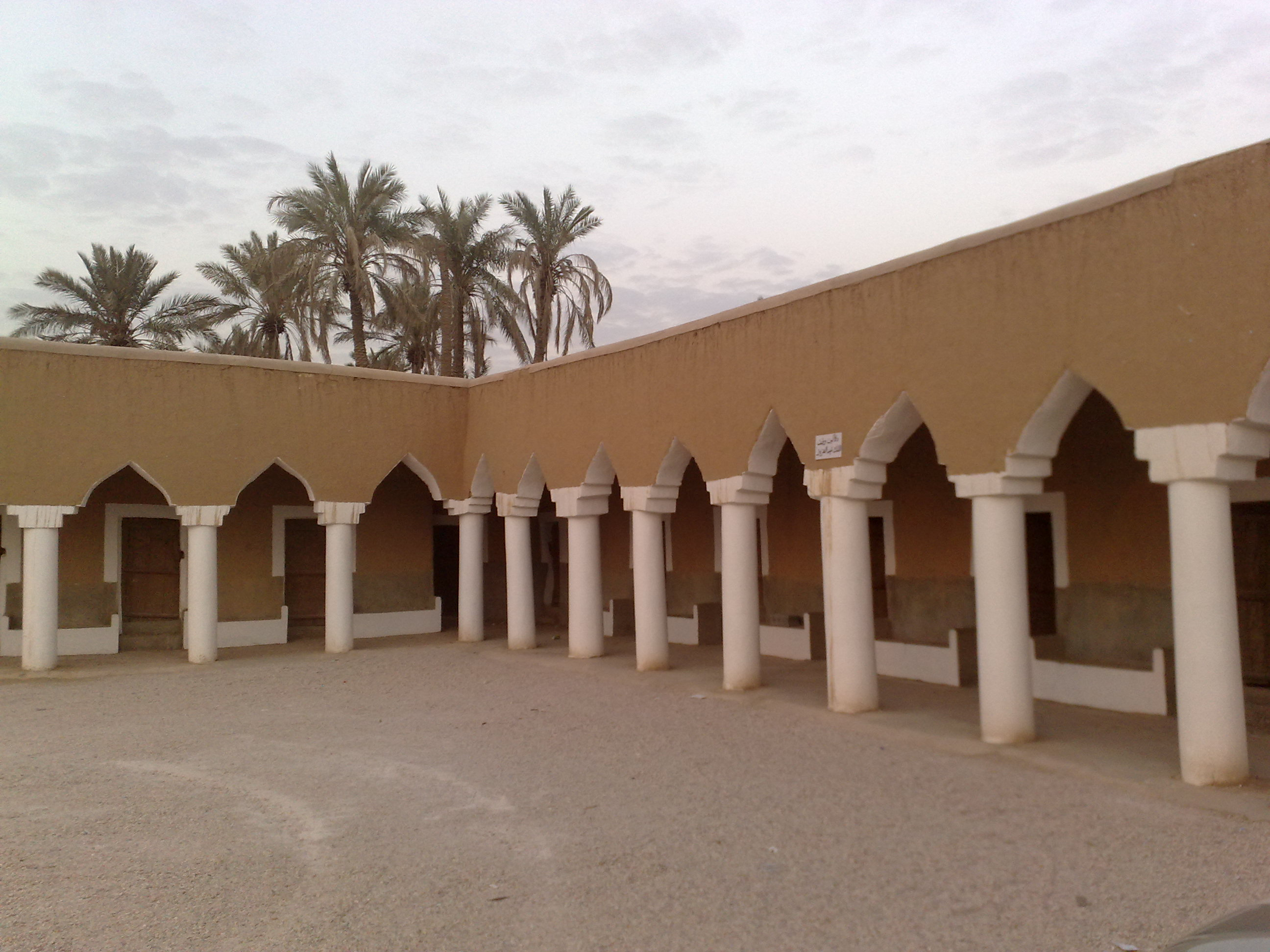

- Location within Saudi Arabia
- Coordinates: 25°54′35.506″N 45°22′50.185″E
- Country: Saudi Arabia
- Province: Riyadh Province
- Region: Najd
- Seat: Majmaah City

Government
  - Governor: Saud Al-Mu'ammar

Area
  - Total: 30,000 km^{2} (12,000 sq mi)

Population (2022 census)
  - Total: 151,877
  - Density: 5.1/km^{2} (13/sq mi)
- Time zone: UTC+03:00 (SAST)

Majmaah or Al-Majmaah (Arabic: المجمعة) is a governorate in Riyadh Province, Saudi Arabia. Its administrative seat is the city of Majmaah. The governorate is located within the historical region of Sudair in Najd.

Map of the Majmaah governorate withen Riyadh Province

== Tourist destinations ==
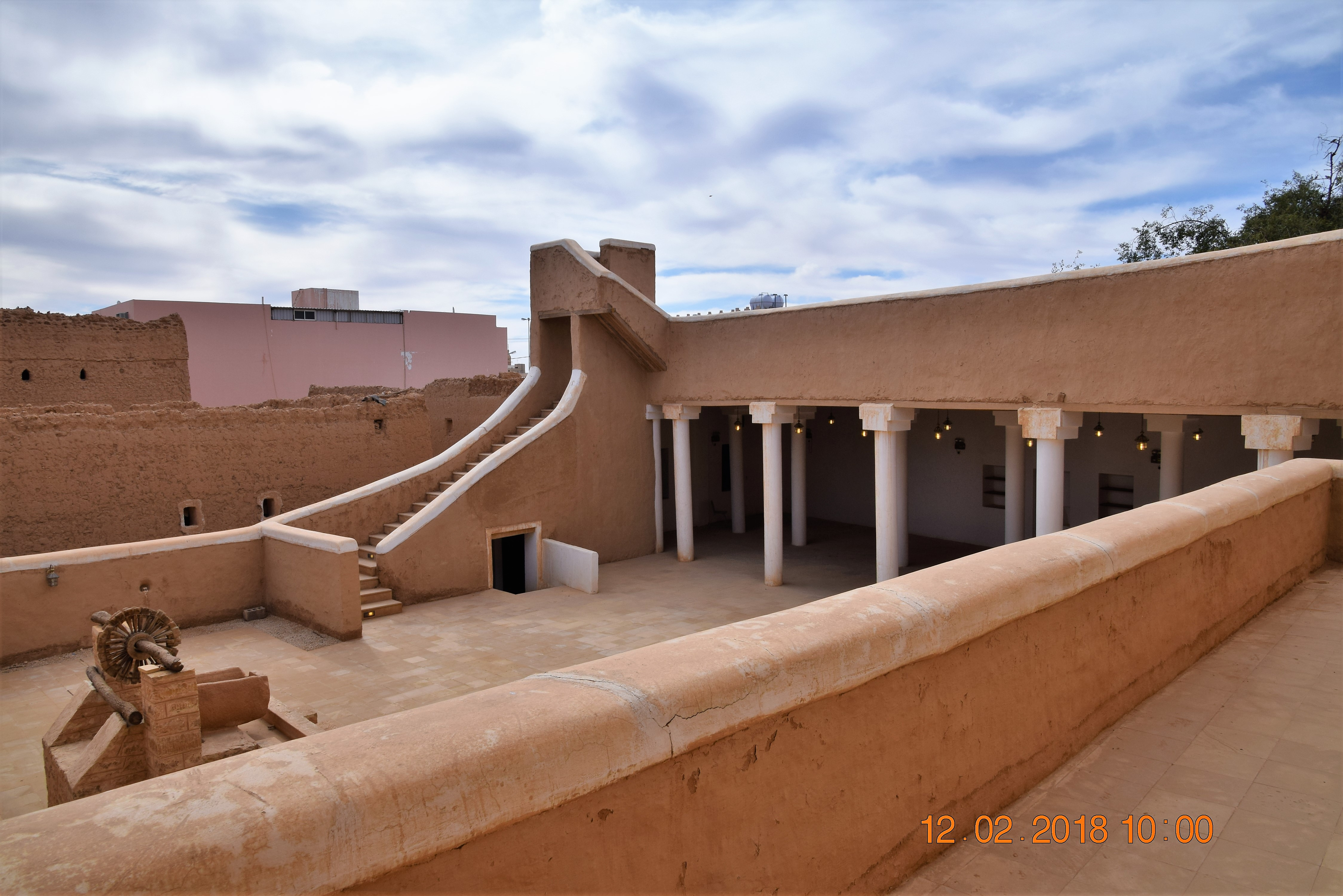
Al-Askar Historic Palace

Majmaah contains several historic sites and public parks. Munikh Castle, also known as Al-Marqab, is a historic mud-and-stone fortress located on a mountain overlooking the city. Al-Askar's Historic Palace is a mud-brick complex dating back approximately 200 years and is an example of Najdi architecture. Mohammed Abdul Karim Heritage House is a restored traditional clay house containing manuscripts, household objects, and other historical artifacts.

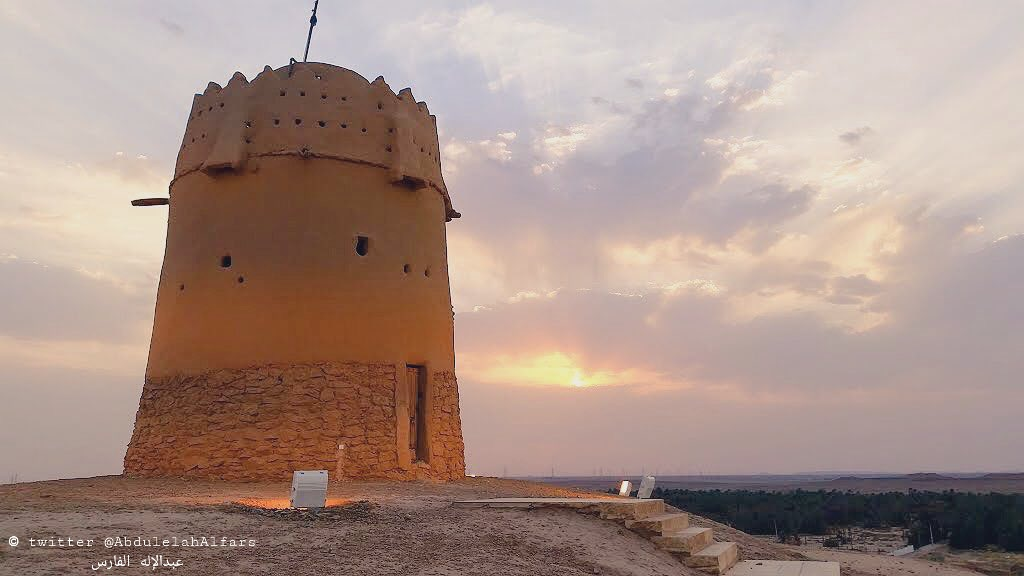
Al-Munikh Castle

Mountain Oasis Park is located on the outskirts of Majmaah and includes green spaces and walking paths within a rocky, mountainous setting.

== Education ==
The governorate is home to Majmaah University, a public university established in 2009. The university includes several colleges covering fields such as medicine, engineering, sciences, education, and business administration.

== Transportation ==
=== Railway ===
The governorate is served by Majmaah railway station on the Riyadh–Qurayyat railway. The railway connects the governorate with other parts of Riyadh Province and with the provinces of Hail, Al-Qassim, and Al-Jouf.

=== Air ===
Majmaah does not have its own airport. Air travel to and from the governorate is served by King Khalid International Airport in Riyadh and Prince Naif International Airport in Al-Qassim Province.

== Sports ==
Majmaah is home to several football clubs, including Al-Fayha, Al-Faisaly, and Al-Mujazzal, which play at Majmaah Sports City Stadium.

== Notable people ==
- Mohammed bin Jubair, former Minister of Justice
- Adel al-Jubeir, Minister of State for Foreign Affairs and former Foreign Affairs Minister
- Abdulaziz al-Tuwaijri, former deputy head of the Saudi National Guard

== See also ==
- Provinces of Saudi Arabia
- List of governorates of Saudi Arabia
- List of cities and towns in Saudi Arabia
