= Majmaah Sports City Stadium =

Multipurpose stadium in Saudi Arabia

Majmaah Sports City Stadium ملعب مدينة المجمعة الرياضية
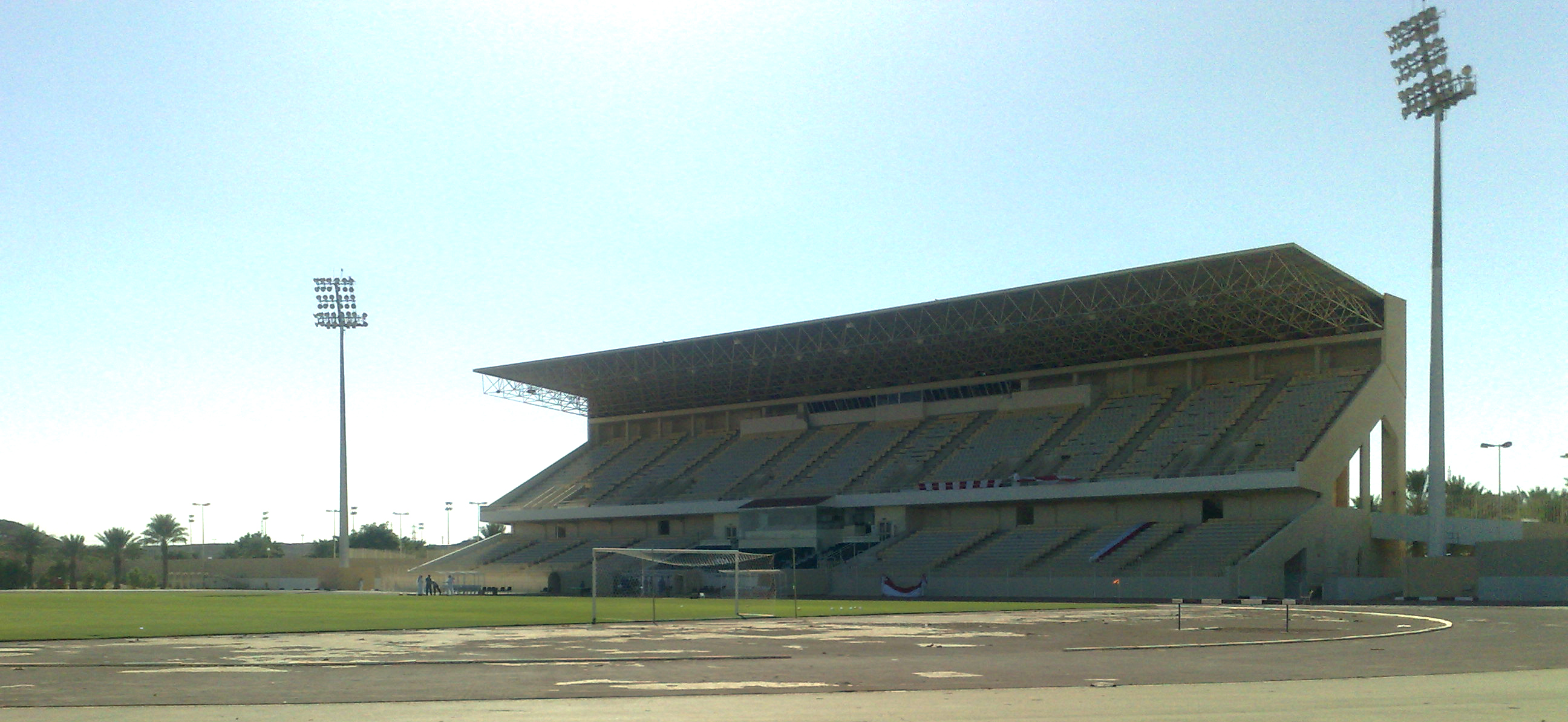
- Interactive map of Majmaah Sports City Stadium ملعب مدينة المجمعة الرياضية
- Full name: Al-Majma'ah Sports City Stadium
- Former names: Prince/King Salman Sports City Stadium (1990–2019)
- Location: Al-Majma'ah, Saudi Arabia
- Coordinates: 25.886929°N 45.368021°E
- Owner: Ministry of Sport
- Operator: Ministry of Sport
- Capacity: 6,843
- Surface: Grass

Construction
- Opened: 1990; 36 years ago
- Renovated: 2025; 1 year ago

Tenants
- Al-Faisaly (1990–present); Al-Fayha (1990–present); Al-Mujazzal (1990–present)

The Majmaah Sports City Stadium is a multi-purpose stadium that serves as the main stadium of the sports city complex in Majmaah, Saudi Arabia. It is currently used mostly for football matches and is the home stadium of Al-Faisaly, Al-Fayha and Al-Mujazzal.

== History ==
The stadium was originally named the Prince Salman Sport City Stadium, in honor of King Salman during his time as crown prince. In 2015, following his accession to the throne, the name was changed to King Salman Sport City Stadium. On 29 May 2019, it was officially renamed to Majmaah Sports City Stadium.

== See also ==
- List of football stadiums in Saudi Arabia
- List of things named after Saudi kings
