= 2016–17 Saudi First Division =

Saudi First Division
- Season: 2016–17
- Champions: Al-Fayha
- Promoted: Al-Fayha; Ohod
- Relegated: Al-Adalh; Al-Jeel; Wej
- Matches: 240
- Goals: 599 (2.5 per match)
- Top goalscorer: Abdulfattah Adam (20 goals)
- Biggest home win: Al-Fayha 5–0 Al-Qaisumah (1 April 2017)
- Biggest away win: Al-Orobah 1–4 Ohod (23 September 2016); Al-Watani 1–4 Hajer (2 October 2016); Damac 1–4 Al-Shoulla (15 October 2016); Al-Adalh 2–5 Al-Fayha (18 March 2017); Wej 2–5 Ohod (22 April 2017)
- Highest scoring: Al-Nojoom 4–3 Al-Jeel (24 December 2016); Al-Jeel 5–2 Al-Watani (30 December 2016); Al-Adalh 2–5 Al-Fayha (18 March 2017); Wej 2–5 Ohod (22 April 2017)
- Longest winning run: 7 matches Ohod
- Longest unbeaten run: 10 matches Al-Fayha
- Longest winless run: 8 matches Al-Watani; Al-Nojoom; Al-Orobah; Wej
- Longest losing run: 5 matches Al-Watani; Al-Tai; Al-Orobah
- All statistics correct as of 5 May 2017.

2016–17 Saudi First Division was the 40th season of the Saudi First Division since its establishment in 1976. The season started on 11 August 2016 and concluded on 5 May 2017.

== Teams ==
A total of 16 teams are contesting the league, including 11 sides from the 2015–16 season, two relegated from the 2015–16 Saudi Professional League and three promoted from the 2015–16 Saudi Second Division. Al-Qaisumah were promoted as champions, while Al-Adalh were promoted as Group B winners. Wej secured the final berth by winning the play-offs.

== Team changes ==
The following teams have changed division since the 2015–16 season.

=== To the First Division ===
Promoted from Second Division

- Al-Qaisumah
- Al-Adalh
- Wej

Relegated from Professional League

- Najran
- Hajer

=== From the First Division ===
Relegated to Second Division

- Al-Mujazzal
- Al-Riyadh
- Al-Diriyah

Promoted to Professional League

- Al-Ettifaq
- Al-Batin

== Stadia and locations ==
Locations of teams in the 2016–17 Saudi First Division

Club	Location	Stadium
Al-Adalh	Al-Hasa	Prince Abdullah bin Jalawi Stadium
Al-Fayha	Al Majma'ah	King Salman Bin Abdulaziz Sport City Stadium
Al-Hazm	Ar Rass	Al Hazm Club Stadium
Al-Jeel	Al-Hasa	Prince Abdullah bin Jalawi Stadium
Al-Nahda	Dammam	Prince Mohamed bin Fahd Stadium
Al-Nojoom	Al-Hasa	Prince Abdullah bin Jalawi Stadium
Al-Orobah	Sakakah	Al-Oruba Club Stadium
Al-Qaisumah	Qaisumah	Al-Qaisumah Club Stadium
Al-Shoulla	Al Kharj	Al-Shoulla Club Stadium
Al-Tai	Ha'il	Prince Abdul Aziz bin Musa'ed Stadium
Al-Watani	Tabuk	King Khalid Sport City Stadium
Damac	Khamis Mushait	Prince Sultan bin Abdul Aziz Stadium
Hajer	Al-Hasa	Prince Abdullah bin Jalawi Stadium
Najran	Najran	Al Akhdoud Club Stadium
Ohod	Medina	Prince Mohammed bin Abdul Aziz Stadium
Wej	Ta'if	King Fahd Stadium

== Foreign players ==
Club	Player 1	Player 2	Former Players
Al-Adalh	(Brazil) Bryan Jones	–	(Mali) Seydou Palo
Al-Fayha	(Ivory Coast) Mechac Koffi	(Sudan) Saeed Mustafa	(Brazil) Pedrinho
Al-Hazm	(Brazil) Robert Gladiador	(Kenya) Kevin Kimani	–
Al-Jeel	(Brazil) Dodô	–	–
Al-Nahda	(Guinea) Naby Soumah	–	(Brazil) Bryan Jones
Al-Nojoom	(Tunisia) Amir Dridi	–	–
Al-Orobah	(Bahrain) Abubaker Khabir	–	–
Al-Qaisumah	(Mali) Ahmad Maiga	(Senegal) Albaye Papa Diop	–
Al-Shoulla	(Nigeria) Omran Saeed	–	(Democratic Republic of the Congo) Yves Diba Ilunga
Al-Tai	(Brazil) Leo	(Jordan) Issa Husamal dean	(Argentina) Lucas Galán
Al-Watani	(Ghana) Francis Coffie	–	(Nigeria) Peter Kolawole
Damac	(Mali) Moussa Tigana	(Nigeria) Peter Kolawole	(Benin) Abdel Fadel Suanon
Hajer	(Cameroon) Hervé Tchami	–	(Guinea) Naby Soumah (Jordan) Yousef Al-Thodan
Najran	(Jordan) Mussab Al-Laham	–	–
Ohod	(Mali) Kafoumba Touré	–	–
Wej	(Romania) Petrișor Voinea	–	–

== Results ==
=== League table ===
Pos	Team	Pld	W	D	L	GF	GA	GD	Pts	Promotion, qualification or relegation
1	Al-Fayha (C, P)	30	13	11	6	50	35	+15	50	Promotion to Professional League
2	Ohod (P)	30	13	9	8	42	30	+12	48	Promotion to Professional League
3	Najran	30	13	7	10	38	34	+4	46	Qualification to promotion play-offs
4	Al-Nahda	30	12	9	9	37	31	+6	45	
5	Al-Orobah	30	10	11	9	34	32	+2	41	
6	Al-Qaisumah	30	11	8	11	44	50	−6	41	
7	Al-Shoulla	30	11	8	11	35	33	+2	41	
8	Damac	30	9	13	8	33	39	−6	40	
9	Hajer	30	10	10	10	38	36	+2	40	
10	Al-Hazem	30	10	8	12	36	30	+6	38	
11	Al-Watani	30	10	7	13	27	37	−10	37	
12	Al-Nojoom	30	8	13	9	38	37	+1	37	
13	Al-Tai	30	10	7	13	34	42	−8	37	
14	Al-Adalh (R)	30	8	12	10	31	41	−10	36	Relegation to Second Division
15	Al-Jeel (R)	30	8	11	11	45	45	0	35	Relegation to Second Division
16	Wej (R)	30	6	12	12	37	47	−10	30	Relegation to Second Division

Updated to match(es) played on 5 May 2017. Source: Goalzz
Rules for classification: 1) Points; 2) Head-to-head points; 3) Head-to-head goal difference; 4) Total goal difference; 5) Total goals scored; 6) Play-off (only for deciding champion, promotion and relegation).
(C) Champions; (P) Promoted; (R) Relegated

=== Results table ===
Home \ Away	ADA	FAY	HAZ	JEL	NAH	NOJ	ORO	QAI	SHO	TAI	WAT	DAM	HJR	NAJ	OHD	WEG
Al-Adalh		2–5	1–0	1–1	2–0	2–2	2–0	1–1	0–1	3–1	2–1	1–1	0–1	2–3	1–1	1–0
Al-Fayha	2–1		1–2	2–2	2–2	2–1	1–1	5–0	3–1	3–1	2–1	1–1	0–3	0–0	2–1	3–0
Al-Hazem	4–0	1–0		0–0	0–1	2–0	1–2	2–2	0–1	2–0	1–1	2–1	0–2	2–0	3–0	0–0
Al-Jeel	2–3	1–1	1–1		1–2	1–1	2–1	1–0	1–0	3–2	5–2	4–0	2–2	1–3	1–2	4–2
Al-Nahda	1–1	1–0	2–0	0–0		2–2	0–0	2–3	3–1	0–3	2–0	3–0	1–0	0–1	2–1	3–1
Al-Nojoom	0–0	1–2	3–2	4–3	2–1		3–1	2–0	2–0	3–0	1–2	1–1	1–1	0–1	2–1	1–1
Al-Orobah	1–1	0–1	1–1	1–2	2–1	2–0		2–1	0–0	1–1	0–1	3–0	3–0	3–0	1–4	2–2
Al-Qaisumah	4–2	0–2	3–2	1–0	0–0	3–2	0–1		2–2	3–0	2–0	2–1	2–3	2–1	2–2	1–1
Al-Shoulla	0–0	2–2	1–0	1–0	0–0	2–0	1–2	2–3		3–0	0–0	1–1	1–0	1–2	1–0	4–0
Al-Tai	2–0	2–3	1–0	3–1	3–3	1–0	2–0	1–1	2–0		1–2	1–2	1–0	3–1	1–2	0–0
Al-Watani	0–1	1–1	2–1	1–1	1–1	0–0	1–1	1–0	2–1	2–0		1–2	1–4	1–2	1–0	0–1
Damac	0–0	2–1	1–1	2–1	1–0	1–1	0–0	3–0	1–4	0–0	1–0		2–0	1–1	2–2	1–1
Hajer	0–0	3–1	0–0	2–0	1–2	0–0	1–1	3–3	2–2	1–1	0–1	2–1		1–2	0–2	2–1
Najran	4–0	1–1	0–2	1–1	1–0	1–1	1–1	3–1	1–2	0–1	1–0	1–2	3–1		1–0	0–1
Ohod	2–0	0–0	2–1	1–1	1–0	0–0	2–0	2–0	1–0	0–0	0–1	3–1	1–1	2–1		2–2
Weg	1–1	1–1	1–3	3–2	1–2	2–2	0–1	1–2	3–0	3–0	3–0	1–1	1–2	1–1	2–5	

Updated to match(es) played on 5 May 2017. Source: Goalzz
Legend: Blue = home team win; Yellow = draw; Red = away team win.

=== Season progress ===
Team ╲ Round	1	2	3	4	5	6	7	8	9	10	11	12	13	14	15	16	17	18	19	20	21	22	23	24	25	26	27	28	29	30
Al-Adalh	L	L	W	D	L	W	D	L	D	W	D	D	D	D	W	D	L	D	L	W	D	W	L	L	L	L	W	D	W	D
Al-Fayha	W	D	D	L	D	L	L	D	W	W	L	W	W	D	W	W	W	D	D	W	D	L	D	W	W	L	W	D	W	D
Al-Hazem	L	L	L	W	W	L	D	W	L	W	W	W	L	D	D	D	L	D	W	L	D	W	L	D	L	W	L	L	D	W
Al-Jeel	D	L	D	W	L	L	W	W	L	L	L	D	W	D	L	W	D	D	L	W	W	L	W	D	D	D	L	L	D	D
Al-Nahda	D	W	L	L	W	W	D	W	W	W	L	W	W	L	L	L	W	D	D	W	D	L	D	D	L	D	W	W	L	D
Al-Nojoom	D	L	W	D	L	W	L	D	D	L	D	L	L	L	W	D	W	D	D	D	D	L	W	D	D	W	L	W	W	D
Al-Orobah	W	W	D	L	D	D	W	L	D	W	W	D	W	D	W	D	L	L	L	L	L	D	L	W	D	D	W	D	L	W
Al-Qaisumah	D	D	W	D	D	W	L	W	L	L	D	D	L	W	L	W	L	L	W	W	D	W	L	D	L	W	W	W	L	L
Al-Shoulla	L	D	L	L	W	W	L	L	W	W	D	D	W	W	D	W	L	W	W	L	D	D	D	D	L	W	L	W	L	L
Al-Tai	L	D	W	L	L	D	D	D	W	L	D	L	W	L	L	L	L	L	W	D	W	W	W	W	W	L	W	L	L	D
Al-Watani	D	L	D	L	L	L	L	L	W	W	L	W	L	W	D	L	L	W	D	W	L	L	W	D	D	L	W	D	W	W
Damac	D	W	L	W	W	L	L	D	D	L	W	W	D	L	D	D	W	D	D	D	D	W	D	L	W	L	D	D	W	L
Hajer	W	D	W	D	W	L	W	D	L	W	L	D	L	W	L	D	W	D	D	L	D	W	L	D	D	W	L	L	W	L
Najran	D	W	L	L	W	W	L	D	L	L	W	L	L	W	W	L	W	W	L	D	W	D	L	W	W	D	D	D	W	W
Ohod	W	W	W	W	W	W	W	D	W	L	D	L	D	D	W	L	D	D	W	L	D	W	D	L	W	L	L	W	L	D
Weg	D	D	L	W	D	W	D	D	D	L	W	L	D	L	L	W	W	D	L	L	L	L	D	D	D	W	L	L	L	D

W = Win; D = Draw; L = Lose

== Statistics ==
=== Scoring ===
==== Top scorers ====
As of 5 May 2017

Rank	Player	Club	Goals
1	(Niger) Abdulfattah Adam	Al-Jeel	20
2	(Mali) Kafoumba Touré	Ohod	18
3	(Brazil) Marco Cortez	Al-Orobah	16
3	(Eritrea) Ahmed Abdu Jaber	Al-Adalh	16
5	(Burkina Faso) Haron Eisa	Al-Watani	15
6	(Democratic Republic of the Congo) Yves Ilunga	Al-Shoulla	12
6	(Saudi Arabia) Fahad Al-Shammeri	Al-Qaisumah	12
6	(Brazil) Douglas	Al-Jeel	12
9	(Saudi Arabia) Ali Al-Aliany	Damac	10
9	(Guinea) Naby Soumah	Al-Nahda	10

==== Hat-tricks ====
Player	For	Against	Result	Date	Ref.
(Saudi Arabia) Ahmed Al-Zaaq	Al-Hazm	Al-Adalh	4–0 (H)	2 October 2016	
(Democratic Republic of the Congo) Yves Diba Ilunga^{4}	Al-Shoulla	Damac	4–1 (A)	15 October 2016	
(Niger) Abdulfattah Adam	Al-Jeel	Damac	4–0 (H)	20 October 2016	
(Saudi Arabia) Bader Al-Khamees	Al-Nahda	Al-Shoulla	3–1 (H)	28 October 2016	
(Saudi Arabia) Saud Salawati	Najran	Al-Jeel	3–1 (A)	25 November 2016	
(Saudi Arabia) Eissa Al-Saeed	Al-Nojoom	Al-Jeel	4–3 (H)	24 December 2016	
(Brazil) Douglas	Al-Jeel	Al-Watani	5–2 (H)	30 December 2016	
(Mali) Kafoumba Touré	Ohod	Wej	5–2 (A)	22 April 2017	

Note

(H) – Home; (A) – Away
^{4} Player scored 4 goals

=== Clean sheets ===
As of 5 May 2017

Rank	Player	Club	Clean sheets
1	(Saudi Arabia) Saeed Al-Harbi	Al-Shoulla	11
2	(Saudi Arabia) Dawod Al Saeed	Al-Nahda	9
2	(Saudi Arabia) Abdoh Besisi	Ohod	9
4	(Saudi Arabia) Mohammed Mazyad	Al-Tai	8
5	(Saudi Arabia) Mohammed Rabee	Al-Orobah	7
5	(Saudi Arabia) Khalid Radhy	Hajer	7
5	(Saudi Arabia) Abdullah Al-Jadaani	Damac	7
8	(Saudi Arabia) Amer Al-Bakhit	Al-Nojoom	6
8	(Saudi Arabia) Yahia Al-Shehri	Al-Hazem	6
8	(Saudi Arabia) Abdulrahman Dagriri	Al-Fayha	6
