= Al-Mujazzal Club =

Association football club in Saudi Arabia

- Full name: Al-Mujazzal Football Club
- Founded: 1975
- Ground: Al Majma'ah Sports City
- Capacity: 7,200
- Chairman: Ahmed Al-Abdullah
- Manager: Waleed Thabet
- League: Third Division
- 2019–20: MS League, 17th of 20 (relegated)
Home colours	Away colours	Third colours

Al-Mujazzal Club (Arabic: نادي المجزل السعودي) is a Saudi Arabian football team based in Al Majma'ah that is currently playing in the Saudi Third Division. Their home stadium is the 6,843-cpacity Al Majma'ah Sports City.

On 23 April 2016, Al-Mujazzal won its first league title, winning the 2015–16 Saudi First Division, and achieved their first promotion to the top flight league. However, on 21 July 2016, the Saudi Arabian Football Federation decided to strip them off their title and promotion due to a match-fixing scandal and demoted them to last place in the 2015–16 Saudi First Division, thus relegating them to the Second Division.

== See also ==
- List of football clubs in Saudi Arabia
