= Marat (governorate) =

Governorate in Riyadh Province, Saudi Arabia

Coordinates: 24°54′N 45°24′E

Marat مرات
- Governorate
- Location of Marat Governorate within Riyadh Province

- Location within Saudi Arabia
- Country: Saudi Arabia
- Province: Riyadh Province
- Region: Najd
- Seat: Marat City

Government
  - Type: Municipality
  - Body: Marat Municipality

Area
  - Total: 9,000 km^{2} (3,500 sq mi)

Population (2022)
  - Total: 9,846
- Time zone: UTC+03:00 (SAST)
- ISO 3166-2: SA-01
- Area code: 011

Marat (Arabic: مَرات) is a governorate in Riyadh Province, Saudi Arabia. It is located in the northern part of the province, approximately 157 km (98 mi) south of Riyadh. The governorate had a population of 9,846 according to the 2022 census.

== History ==
Marat is a historical settlement in the Al-Washm area of the Najd region in central Saudi Arabia. Among the historical landmarks associated with the town are the ruins of Al-Aroosah and Al-Walidi Well. The latter is traditionally attributed to Khalid ibn Al-Walid, a commander under Islamic prophet Muhammad, who is said to have dug it during his passage through the area on a journey towards Al-Yamama. First references to the place as Marat are from the early 16th century.

Marat historically occupied an important position along the Hijaz Road, and served as a stopping point for travellers and caravans, including those travelling to Mecca for the Hajj. King Ibn Saud stayed at the palace in Merat during his journey to Mecca in 1930. Al-Amiriah School, the first school in Riyadh Province, was established in Merat in 1948. Al-Awwal School, the first school for girls, opened in 1967.

== Geography ==
Marat is one of the 22 governorates of the Riyadh Province. It is located about 147 km (91 mi) south of Riyadh in the northern part of the province. It borders the governorates of Shaqra to the north, Al-Quway'iyah and Dhurma to the south, Thadiq and Huraymila to the east, and Al-Dawadmi to the west. Jabal Kumait is a prominent mountain overlooking Marat and Ghudair Kumait, a natural depression where rainwater accumulates.

== Demographics and economy ==
According to the 2022 census, Marat Governorate had a population of 9,846 and was the least populated governorate in the province. The population included 5,819 (59.1%) males and 4,027 (40.9%) females. Of the total population, 6,914 (70.2%) were Saudi nationals and 2,932 (29.8%) were non-Saudis.

Marat's economy benefited from its location along the Hijaz Road as the movement of pilgrims, merchants, and other travellers contributed to its commercial activity, particularly during the Hajj season.

== See also ==
- Provinces of Saudi Arabia
- List of cities and towns in Saudi Arabia
