= Al Aflaj Governorate =

Governorate in Riyadh Province, Saudi Arabia

Al-Aflaj الأفلاج
- Governorate
- Location of Al-Aflaj Governorate within the Riyadh Province

- Location within Saudi Arabia
- Coordinates (Layla): 22°17′N 46°44′E
- Country: Saudi Arabia
- Province: Riyadh Province
- Region: Najd
- Seat: Layla City

Government
  - Type: Municipality
  - Body: Al-Aflaj Municipality

Area
  - Total: 51,160 km^{2} (19,750 sq mi)

Population (2022)
  - Total: 54,544
  - Density: 1.066/km^{2} (2.761/sq mi)
- Time zone: UTC+03:00 (SAST)
- ISO 3166-2: SA-01
- Area code: 011

Al-Aflaj (Arabic: الأفلاج) is a governorate in Riyadh Province, Saudi Arabia. It is located in the southeastern part of the province, approximately 300 km (190 mi) from Riyadh. The governorate covers an area of approximately 51,160 km^{2} (19,750 sq mi) and had a population of 54,544 according to the 2022 census. Jabal Toubad in the governorate is linked with poet Qays ibn al-Mulawwah of Layla and Majnun.

== History ==
Al-Aflaj governorate contains several historical and archeological sites. Among its notable historical landmarks is Jabal Toubad, which is associated with the seventh-century Arab poet Qays ibn al-Mulawwah and his beloved Layla al-Amiriyah of Layla and Majnun. The governorate is home to large, ancient mud palaces with large walls built from burnt mud bricks and coated with gypsum. Historical sites include Qusairat 'Ad, Sadah, Murgham Fortress, al-'Adi Palace, Salma Palace, and the al-Huzaimi Mosque.

The Qusairat 'Ad site that dates back to the same period as Al-Faw in Wadi ad-Dawasir governorate. Qusairat 'Ad was surveyed in 1978 as part of a archaeological Survey of Central Saudi Arabia. In 2021, the Heritage Commission initiated a project to study the site and its surrounding archaeological locations. It is also known for its underground canal irrigation system, known as al-Kharaz, which features small interconnected channels originating from a natural spring. A 2026 study dated the archeological evidence as ranging from the fifth century BCE to the sixth century CE. The al-'Ayun archaeological site was investigated through excavations conducted in 1988 and 1989.

== Geography ==
Al-Aflaj is one of the governorates of Riyadh Province in the Najd region of central Saudi Arabia. Located southeastern part of Riyadh Province, approximately 300 km (190 mi) from Riyadh, the governorate covers an area of approximately 51,160 km^{2} (19,750 sq mi). It is the third-largest governorate by area in the province. It borders the governorates of Al-Kharj and Hotat Bani Tamim to the north, Al-Sulayyil to the south, Wadi ad-Dawasir and Al-Quway'iyah to the west, and the Eastern Province to the east. Its administrative centre is the city of Layla, named after Layla al-Amiriyah.

== Demographics and economy ==
According to the 2010 census, the governorate had a population of 68,840 inhabitans, which reduced to 54,544 in 2022.

Agriculture is one of the principal economic activities in the governorate. Agricultural fields and settlements are spread across the foothills and edges of the Tuwaiq Mountains. Al-Aflaj is particularly known for its production of several varieties of dates. There are more than 800,000 date palm trees. It also hosts an annual date festival. Agricultural production has depended on the region's natural springs and underground water resources. The governorate has a branch of Prince Sattam bin Abdulaziz University.

== See also ==
- Provinces of Saudi Arabia
- List of cities and towns in Saudi Arabia
