= Hotat Bani Tamim =

Governorate in Riyadh Province, Saudi Arabia

Hotat Bani Tamim حوطة بني تميم
- Governorate
- Location of Hotat Bani Tamim Governorate within Riyadh Province

- Location within Saudi Arabia
- Country: Saudi Arabia
- Province: Riyadh Province
- Region: Najd
- Seat: Hotat Bani Tamim City

Government
  - Type: Municipality
  - Body: Hotat Bani Tamim Municipality

Area
  - Total: 7,350 km^{2} (2,840 sq mi)

Population (2022)
  - Total: 41,854
  - Density: 5.69/km^{2} (14.7/sq mi)
- Time zone: UTC+03:00 (SAST)
- ISO 3166-2: SA-01
- Area code: 011

Hotat Bani Tamim (Arabic: حوطة بني تميم), also spelled Hawtat Bani Tamim, is a governorate in Riyadh Province, Saudi Arabia. It is located approximately 180 kilometres (110 mi) south of Riyadh. The governorate covers an area of approximately 7,350 km^{2} (2,840 sq mi) and had a population of 41,854 according to the 2022 census. The Ibex Reserve Protected Area is located in the governorate.

== Geography ==
Hotat Bani Tamim is one of the 22 governorates of Riyadh Province. It is located approximately 180 km (110 mi) south of Riyadh. Spread over an area of approximately 7,350 km^{2} (2,840 sq mi), it is one of the smallest governorates by land area in the province. It borders the governorates of Ad-Dilam and Al-Hariq to the north, Al-Aflaj to the south, Ad-Dilam and Al-Kharj to the east, and Al-Hariq to the west.

The Ibex Reserve Protected Area is located near Hilwa in the governorate. It is identified as a Key Biodiversity Area by the Key Biodiversity Areas Partnership. Located in the Tuwaiq Escarpment, it extends for 1,840 km^{2} (710 sq mi). The escarpment consists of limestone formed during the Middle Jurassic period, with elevations ranging from approximately 600 to 1,080 m (1,970 to 3,540 ft). There are about 265 species of flora including Haloxylon salicornicum, Acacia tortilis, Rhazya stricta, Ziziphus nummularia, Acacia tortilis, Lycium shawii, Rhanterium epapposum, and Calotropis procera identified in the park. Fauna include Nubian Ibex, hyrax, mongoose, and eagle. It experiences a tropical climate with hot summers and cold winters, with only about 200 mm (7.9 in) of rainfall. The governorate also contains the Shuaib al-Khodariyah Botanical Reserve, spread across an area of 2.094 km^{2} (0.808 sq mi).

== Demographics and economy ==
According to the 2010 census, the governorate had a population of 43,716 inhabitants, which decreased to 41,854 inhabitants in 2022.

Agricultural activity in the governorate includes the cultivation of citrus fruits. The governorate also hosts a branch of Prince Sattam bin Abdulaziz University, which houses the College of Sciences and Humanities.

== See also ==
- Provinces of Saudi Arabia
- List of cities and towns in Saudi Arabia
