= Thadig =

Governorate in Riyadh Province, Saudi Arabia

Thadiq ثادق
- Governorate
- Location of Thadiq Governorate within Riyadh Province

- Location within Saudi Arabia
- Country: Saudi Arabia
- Province: Riyadh Province
- Region: Najd
- Seat: Thadiq City

Government
  - Type: Municipality
  - Body: Thadiq Municipality

Area
  - Total: 3,510 km^{2} (1,360 sq mi)

Population (2019)
  - Total: 12,510
  - Density: 3.56/km^{2} (9.23/sq mi)
- Time zone: UTC+03:00 (SAST)
- ISO 3166-2: SA-01
- Area code: 011

Thadiq (Arabic: ثادق) is a governorate in Riyadh Province, Saudi Arabia. It is located approximately 180 km (110 mi) northwest of Riyadh. The governorate covers an area of approximately 3,510 km^{2} (1,360 sq mi) and had a population of 12,510 according to the 2022 census.

== History ==
Thadig is a historical town in the Al-Mahmal region in Najd. It was founded in the 17th century. It is historically known as the "Mother of Guns", for its role in supporting King Ibn Saud during the establishment of the modern Saudi state. It consists of several historical buildings, and archaeological sites, including the Al-Jirsi Castle, associated with the Jirisi family and dating to the period before the establishment of the third Saudi state, and the inscriptions on the mountains near Wadi al-Safrat.

== Geography ==
Thadiq is one of the 22 governorates of Riyadh Province. It is located in central Saudi Arabia, approximately 165 km (103 mi) northwest of Riyadh. It is spread over an area of 3,510 km^{2} (1,360 sq mi). It borders the governorates of Al-Majma'ah to the north, Rumah to the east, Huraymila to the south and southeast, and Shaqra and Marat to the west.

The North Riyadh Geopark is located in the governorate. It is spread over approximately 3,221 km^{2} (1,244 sq mi) and is managed by the National Center for Vegetation Cover Development and Combating Desertification. Declared as a UNESCO global geopark in 2025, it consists of several geological sites including eroded limestone formations dating to the Jurassic to Cretaceous period (approximately 201 to 66 million years ago). The Obaitharan valley, approximately 40 km (25 mi) long, is formed by the Tuwaiq Mountains, and channels water into a reservoir that supports irrigation. The vegetation includes acacia, ghaf, and sidr trees. More than 270,000 trees have been planted in the park as a part of a project to combat desertification. The park supports several species of birds and animals, and houses introduced population of Arabian gazelles.

== Demographics and economy ==
According to the 2010 census, the governorate had a population of 17,046 inhabitants, which decreased to 12,510 inhabitants in 2022. It was the fourth least populous governorate in the province.

== See also ==
- Provinces of Saudi Arabia
- List of cities and towns in Saudi Arabia
