= Rimah Governorate =

Governorate in Riyadh Province, Saudi Arabia

Rimah رماح
- Governorate
- Location of Rimah Governorate within Riyadh Province

- Location within Saudi Arabia
- Country: Saudi Arabia
- Province: Riyadh Province
- Region: Najd
- Seat: Rimah City

Government
  - Type: Municipality
  - Body: Rimah Municipality

Area
  - Total: 19,070 km^{2} (7,360 sq mi)

Population (2022)
  - Total: 35,683
  - Density: 1.871/km^{2} (4.846/sq mi)
- Time zone: UTC+03:00 (SAST)
- ISO 3166-2: SA-01
- Area code: 011

Rimah (Arabic: رماح), also transliterated as Ramah or Rumah, is a governorate in Riyadh Province, Saudi Arabia. It is located approximately 132 km (82 mi) northeast of Riyadh. The governorate covers an area of approximately 19,070 km^{2} (7,360 sq mi) and had a population of 35,683 according to the 2022 census. The annual King Abdulaziz Camel Festival takes place at the village of Al-Sayahid in the governorate.

== Geography ==
Rimah is one of the 22 governorates of Riyadh Province in the Najd region of central Saudi Arabia. Located about 132 km (82 mi) northeast of Riyadh, the governorate covers an area of approximately 19,070 km^{2} (7,360 sq mi). The governorate is bordered by the Eastern Province to the north and east, Riyadh to the southwest, and the governorates of Al-Kharj to the south, and Al-Majma'ah, Thadiq, and Huraymila to the west.

== Demographics ==
According to the 2010 census, the governorate had a population of 28,036 inhabitants, which increased to 35,683 in 2022. The population consisted of 22,863 (64.1%) males and 12,820 (35.9%) females. Of the total population, 23,342 (65.4%) were Saudi nationals and 12,341 (34.6%) were non-Saudis.

== Camel festival ==
The King Abdulaziz Camel Festival, an annual cultural festival and entertainment event takes place at the village of Al-Sayahid in the Rumah governorate. The festival takes place for 30 to 45 days and more than 35,000 camels participate in various events, competitions, and fairs. In 2022, the Saudi Camel Club announced the development of two additional land routes to facilitate the movement of camels to the festival venue.

== See also ==
- Provinces of Saudi Arabia
- List of cities and towns in Saudi Arabia
