= Al-Ghat =

Governorate in Riyadh Province, Saudi Arabia

Al-Ghat الغاط
- Governorate
- Location of Al-Ghat Governorate within Riyadh Province

- Location within Saudi Arabia
- Country: Saudi Arabia
- Province: Riyadh Province
- Region: Najd
- Seat: Al-Ghat City

Government
  - Type: Municipality
  - Body: Al-Ghat Municipality

Area
  - Total: 5,500 km^{2} (2,100 sq mi)

Population (2022)
  - Total: 10,799
  - Density: 2.0/km^{2} (5.1/sq mi)
- Time zone: UTC+03:00 (SAST)
- ISO 3166-2: SA-01
- Area code: 011

Al-Ghat (Arabic: الغاط) is a governorate in Riyadh Province, Saudi Arabia. It is located approximately 240 km (150 mi) northwest of Riyadh. The governorate covers an area of approximately 5,500 km^{2} (2,100 sq mi) and had a population of 10,799 according to the 2022 census.

== History ==
Al-Ghat Governorate hosts several historical and archelogical sites. Several rock inscriptions and carvings have been found along the western bank of Wadi Markh in the north-eastern part of the governorate. Dated to approximately 900 BCE to 400 CE, these include inscriptions in Thamudic script and petroglyphs of animals, human figures, and other forms. Archaeological surveys have also identified stone tools from the Middle Palaeolithic period and other stone structures from a nearby site. Located about 3 km (1.9 mi) from the modern settlement, the Al-Ghat heritage village spread over an area of 0.5 km^{2} (0.19 sq mi), houses several buildings from the Abassid Caliphate period.

== Geography ==
Al-Ghat is one of the 22 governorates of Riyadh Province. Situated approximately 240 km (150 mi) northwest of Riyadh, along the Highway 65. The governorate covers an area of approximately 5,500 km^{2} (2,100 sq mi), and borders the governorates of Al-Zulfi to the north, Al-Majma'ah and Shaqra to the south, Al-Majma'ah to the east, and Al-Qassim Province to the west. It comprises thirteen administrative centers.

The governorate includes parts of the Tuwaiq Mountains, Hamada plains, and Nafud desert. The Al-Ghat National Park covers approximately 25 km^{2} (9.7 sq mi) and contains around 30,000 planted trees, including acacias and jujubes. It experiences a hot and dry climate in the summer.

== Demographics and culture ==
According to the 2010 census, the governorate had a population of 15,202 inhabitants, which decreased to 10,799 inhabitants in 2022.

The Al-Ghat Museum, which earlier served as the administative headquarters of the Emirate of al-Ghat, was established in 1966, and houses various archaeological and cultural artifacts. The Al-Rahmaniya Library, located in the Al-Arniyeh orchard, was established in 2003 by the family of Prince Abdulrahman Bin Ahmed Al-Sudairy.

== See also ==
- Provinces of Saudi Arabia
- List of cities and towns in Saudi Arabia
