= Dhurma =

Governorate in Riyadh Province, Saudi Arabia

Dhurma ضرما
- Governorate
- Location of Dhurma Governorate within Riyadh Province

- Location within Saudi Arabia
- Country: Saudi Arabia
- Province: Riyadh Province
- Region: Najd
- Seat: Dhurma City

Government
  - Type: Municipality
  - Body: Dhurma Municipality

Area
  - Total: 2,060 km^{2} (800 sq mi)

Population
  - Total: 26,299
  - Density: 12.8/km^{2} (33.1/sq mi)
- Time zone: UTC+03:00 (SAST)
- ISO 3166-2: SA-01
- Area code: 011

Dhurma (Arabic: ضرما) is a governorate in Riyadh Province, Saudi Arabia. It is located approximately 60 km (37 mi) west of Riyadh. The governorate covers an area of approximately 2,060 km^{2} (800 sq mi) and had a population of 26,299 according to the 2022 census.

== History ==
The village of Qarqara and its historic market dates back to the Abbasid Caliphate reign during the ninth century. Other historical sites in the governorate include the Al-Fargh Palace, constructed of clay and is more than 300 years old, and Bihawamih Palace, dating back to more than two centuries.

According to John Lorimer's account, Dhurma resisted the Egyptian forces led by Ibrahim Pasha during their campaign against Diriyah in 1818. After its capture by the Egyptian forces, it was subjected to severe reprisals including killing of several people.

Imam Turki bin Abdullah, the founder of the Second Saudi State, originated from the region. Dhurma also played a role in the unification of Saudi Arabia under King Ibn Saud.

== Geography ==
Dhurma is one of the 22 governorates of Riyadh Province. Situated approximately 60 km (37 mi), the governorate covers an area of approximately 2,060 km^{2} (800 sq mi). It borders the Al-Washm Region to the west, Dirab and Tuwaiq Regions to the east, and Al-Muzahmiyya Governorate to the south.

As per Lorimer's account, the governorate is situated in a plain drained by three streams along the western slopes of the Tuwaiq Mountains. The combined drainage passes through the Dhurma plain before continuing southeastwards towards Wadi Hanifah, and the town's date palm plantations depended on the same. The Tuwaiq mountains are located to the northeast and northwest, while a desert lies to the south-west. A route extends to Shaqra along the plains in the north west.

Parts of Dhurma and the neighbouring Al-Muzahmiyya Governorate are part of the Imam Abdulrahman bin Faisal Reserve, established under the Royal Commission for Riyadh City in September 2026. The reserve covers approximately 4,310 km^{2} (1,660 sq mi), bordering the Tuwaiq Mountains.

== Demographics ==
According to the 2010 census, the governorate had a population of 22,422 inhabitants, which increased to 26,299 inhabitants in 2022.

== See also ==
- Provinces of Saudi Arabia
- List of cities and towns in Saudi Arabia
