= Al-Quway'iyah =

Governorate in Riyadh Province, Saudi Arabia

Al-Quway'iyah القويعية
- Governorate
- Location of Al-Quway'iyah Governorate within Riyadh Province

- Location within Saudi Arabia
- Country: Saudi Arabia
- Province: Riyadh Province
- Region: Najd
- Seat: Al-Quway'iyah City

Government
  - Type: Municipality
  - Body: Al-Quway'iyah Municipality

Area
  - Total: 52,000 km^{2} (20,000 sq mi)

Population (2022)
  - Total: 71,410
  - Density: 1.4/km^{2} (3.6/sq mi)
- Time zone: UTC+03:00 (SAST)
- ISO 3166-2: SA-01
- Area code: 011

Al-Quway'iyah (Arabic: القويعية), also spelled Al-Quwayiyah or Al-Quway'iya, is a governorate in Riyadh Province, Saudi Arabia. It is located approximately 182 km (113 mi) southwest of Riyadh. The governorate covers an area of approximately 52,000 km^{2} (20,000 sq mi) and had a population of 71,410 according to the 2022 census.

== History ==
Archeological evidence in the region points to human presence dating back to fifth millennium BCE. Several tribes and civilizations flourished in the region including the Thamud, whose presence could be ascertained from the inscriptions in the Musayqira plateau in the governorate. The Musayqira archaeological site, located east of Al-Quway'iyah, contains numerous rock carvings and petroglyphs including depictions of humans, animals, and abstract symbols and inscriptions in Thamudic, Arabic, and others. The Jabal Umm Sariha archeological site, located approximately 2.5 km (1.6 mi) southwest of Al-Quway'iyah town, also contains several rock-art.

There are several historical defensive structures including walls and towers. The area is associated with the Dahis and al-Ghabra conflict, a fight between Arab tribes during the pre-Islamic period. Al-Quway'iyah was earlier known as Sawad Bahla after the Bahla tribe that inhabited the region. It acquired its present name due its location in the Wadi al-Quway'iyah.

== Geography ==
Al-Quway'iyah is one of the 22 governorates of Riyadh Province. It is approximately 182 km (113 mi) southwest of Riyadh, along the Highway 40, which connects Riyadh and Taif. It lies along edge of the Arabian Shield on a mountainous plain, covering an area of approximately 52,000 km^{2} (20,000 sq mi). The Al-Hadba and Al-Jella deserts lie to the east of the governorate. It borders the governorates of Al-Dawadmi and Marat to the north, Al-Muzahmiyya and Dhurma to the east, Al-Rayyan and Wadi ad-Dawasir to the south, and Afif to the west. The governorate comprises more than 600 villages and settlements.

A geological study in 1988 around Al-Quway'iyah identified predominantly igneous and metamorphic rock formations of different ages and compositions. The western ranges of the Al-Arid Mountains in the governorate has deposits of various minerals including gold, zinc, kyanite, and feldspar. The Khnaiguiyah deposit, extending over 353 km^{2} (136 sq mi), has an estimated deposit of 25 million tons of minerals including zinc, copper, iron and manganese.

== Demographics and economy ==
According to the 2022 census, the governorate had a population of 71,410 inhabitants.

Agriculture, trade and mining are among the major economic activities in the governorate. The governorate holds the annual Quwaiyah Date Festival. The governorate also hosts branches of Shaqra University, including several colleges.

== See also ==
- Provinces of Saudi Arabia
- List of governorates of Saudi Arabia
- List of cities and towns in Saudi Arabia
