= Wadi ad-Dawasir =

Governorate in Riyadh Province, Saudi Arabia

Wadi ad-Dawasir وادي الدواسر
- Governorate
- Location of Wadi ad-Dawasir Governorate within Riyadh Province

- Location within Saudi Arabia
- Country: Saudi Arabia
- Province: Riyadh Province
- Region: Najd
- Seat: Wadi ad-Dawasir

Government
  - Type: Municipality
  - Body: Wadi ad-Dawasir Municipality

Area
  - Total: 45,740 km^{2} (17,660 sq mi)

Population (2022)
  - Total: 91,535
  - Density: 2.001/km^{2} (5.183/sq mi)
- Time zone: UTC+03:00 (SAST)
- ISO 3166-2: SA-01
- Area code: 011

Wadi ad-Dawasir (Arabic: وادي الدواسر) is a governorate in Riyadh Province, Saudi Arabia. It is located in the southern part of the province, approximately 650 km (400 mi) south of Riyadh. The governorate covers an area of approximately 45,740 km^{2} (17,660 sq mi) and had a population of 91,535 according to the 2022 census.

== History ==
The governorate contains several historical monuments and archaeological sites, most notable is the archaeological area of Al-Faw. The Al-Faw Archaeological Area contains nearly 12,000 archaeological remains including stone tools, rock carvings, funerary strictures, and other constructions, dating from prehistoric to the pre-Islamic era. The funerary structures have been dated to the third millennium BCE. The city of Qaryat al-Faw, based around an oasis, was located along an ancient trade route connecting Najran with central and eastern Arabia. It served as the capital of the Kingdom of Kinda that ruled the region that stretched till the Tuwaiq Mountains. It was established in the first millennium BCE and was abandonment in the fifth century CE due to scarcity of water. It was inscribed on the UNESCO World Heritage List in 2024.

Wadi ad-Dawasir was an emirate, and was earlier known by several names including al-Aqiq, Aqiq Bani Oqail, and Aqiq Tamrah. The governorate was established in 1911 during the reign of King Ibn Saud. It is named after the Dawasir tribe, who inhabit the area. The governorate also hosts several palaces, the most notable of which is the Barzan Palace, commissioned by King Ibn Saud.

== Geography ==
Wadi ad-Dawasir is one of the 22 governorates of the Riyadh Province in the Najd region in central Saudi Arabia. Located about 650 km (400 mi) south of Riyadh, the governorate covers an area of approximately 45,740 km^{2} (17,660 sq mi). It borders the governorate of Al-Sulayyil and Al-Aflaj to the east, the governorates of Aseer and Makkah al-Mukarramah to the west, Al-Quway'iyah to the north, and Najran to the south.

The governorate experiences high temperature and humidity. Average temperatures vary from 43 °C (109 °F) in the summer to 6 °C (43 °F) in the winter with low rainfall of around 37.6 mm (1.48 in) annually. The 'Uruq Bani Ma'arid and Majami'al-Hadb Reserves are located in the governorate and serve as a habitat for various wildlife such as Arabian oryx, Arabian sand gazelle, ibex, wolf, and ostrich.

== Demographics and economy ==
According to the 2010 census, the governorate had a population of 105,234 inhabitans, which reduced to 91,535 in 2022.

The governorate is a major agricultural region. It hosts a granary with a capacity of five hundred thousand tonnes, the second largest in Riyadh Province. Agricultural has expanded significantly from 551 km^{2} (213 sq mi) of cultivated land in 1984 to 3,107 km^{2} (1,200 sq mi) in 2016. About 41% of the land area of the governorate was cultivated in 2018. It is widely irrigated by water supply from oases and aquifiers. Major produce include wheat, potato, tomato, and melon grown mostly in winter and fodder grass. Animal husbandry is also practised with sheep and camels commonly reared in the region.

== See also ==
- Provinces of Saudi Arabia
- List of cities and towns in Saudi Arabia
