= Almardamah =

Mardamah, Riyadh
- town
- Aerial view of Almardamah
- Country: Saudi Arabia

Government
  - Mayor: Sheikh Nasir bin Waraek Alhers Al-otaibi

Population (2008)
  - Estimate (2008): 7,000
- ZIP codes: 00966-00966
- Area code: 0966
- Website: www.almardamah.org

Almardamah (Arabic: المردمة Almardmah; Mardamah) is a town in Saudi Arabia located on the north-western district of Riyadh province, managed by Riyadh Municipality and headed by the mayor of Almardamah Sheikh: Nasir bin Waraek Alhers Al-Otaibi .

== Location ==
It is located in north-western Najed approximately 20 miles (37 km) south of Afif.

== Population ==
The population of Almardamah was 7,000 at the 2010 census. It is considered one of the fastest growing mid-population towns in the Riyadh Province in Saudi Arabia.

== Education ==
Almardamah is a home to one college and several schools.

== See also ==
- List of cities and towns in Saudi Arabia
- Regions of Saudi Arabia
