= Ghazalah =

City and Governorate in Hail Province, Saudi Arabia

Ghazalah Governorate محافظة الغزالة
- City and Governorate
- Location of Ghazalah governorate within Hail Province

- Location of Ghazalah within Saudi Arabia
- Coordinates: 26°10′00″N 40°55′00″E
- Country: Saudi Arabia
- Province: Hail Province
- Region: Najd
- Seat: Ghazalah City

Government
  - Type: Municipality
  - Body: Ghazalah Municipality

Population (2022)
  - Metro: 12,767 (Ghazalah Governorate)
- Time zone: UTC+03:00 (SAST)
- Area code: 016

Ghazalah also spelled as Ghazala (Arabic: الغزالة, romanized: Al-Ghazālah) is a city and governorate in Hail Province.

== Transportation ==
=== Air ===
Hail International Airport in Hail City serves as the nearest major airport to Ghazalah Governorate, providing both domestic and limited international flights.

=== Rail ===
Ghazalah is connected to the national railway network through the Hail railway station located in Hail City, which is part of the Riyadh–Qurayyat railway operated by Saudi Arabia Railways. The line links the province with Riyadh, Majmaah, Al-Qassim, Al-Jawf, and Qurayyat.

== See also ==
- Provinces of Saudi Arabia
- List of governorates of Saudi Arabia
- List of cities and towns in Saudi Arabia
