= Al Kharkhir =

Former governorate in Najran Province, Saudi Arabia

Al-Kharkhir الخرخير
- Governorate
- Location within Saudi Arabia
- Coordinates: 19°08′N 50°57′E
- Country: Saudi Arabia
- Province: Najran Province
- Seat: Al-Kharkhir
- Time zone: UTC+03:00 (SAST)

Al-Kharkhir (Arabic: الخرخير) was a former governorate in Najran Province, Saudi Arabia. It was abolished in 2014 due to its remote location. Its territory was merged into Sharurah Governorate, and its population was relocated primarily to Al-Ahsa Governorate and Sharurah. By 2018, public services in the area had been fully discontinued following the completion of the relocation process. It remains the only governorate in Saudi Arabia to have been officially abolished.

== See also ==
- Provinces of Saudi Arabia
- List of governorates of Saudi Arabia
- List of cities and towns in Saudi Arabia
