= Al-Dawadmi =

Governorate in Riyadh Province, Saudi Arabia

Al-Dawadmi الدوادمي
- Governorate
- Location of Al-Dawadmi Governorate within Riyadh Province

- Location within Saudi Arabia
- Country: Saudi Arabia
- Province: Riyadh Province
- Seat: Dawadmi

Area
  - Total: 27,740 km^{2} (10,710 sq mi)

Population (2022)
  - Total: 200,620
  - Density: 7.232/km^{2} (18.73/sq mi)
- Time zone: UTC+03:00 (SAST)

Al-Dawadmi (الدوادمي) is a governorate in Riyadh Province, Saudi Arabia. The governorate covers an area of approximately 27,740 km^{2} (10,710 sq mi) and had a population of 200,620 according to the 2022 census. The King Abdulaziz Palace, constructed in 1931, near Dawadmi, was the first Saudi royal palace constructed outside of Riyadh.

== History ==
Archaeological evidence from Safaqah in the governorate have been estimated to be approximately 230,000 years old. Prehistoric rock art and inscriptions have been found at Aswadah, the Masel al-Jumh Mountains, and the Thahlan Mountains, while early Islamic inscriptions have been documented at Hulayt and Safaqah. Excavations at the Hulayt archaeological site have revealed the remains of pottery and furnaces used for metalworking, dating to the early Umayyad or Abbasid periods. In 2026, the Heritage Commission documented more than 100 archaeological sites in the governorate as a part of the High Najd Project. The survey recorded 187 animal depictions, 36 human figures, 31 Thamudic and early Islamic inscriptions, and 36 symbols and tribal marks, as well as stone structures including stone circles, cairn tombs and cairns.

The King Abdulaziz Palace, constructed in 1931 to the west of Dawadmi, was the first Saudi royal palace constructed outside of Riyadh. It subsequently served as the administrative headquarters of the governorate. Satellite imagery taken in November 2018 and examined by experts at the Middlebury Institute of International Studies appeared to show a suspected ballistic missile facility in Al-Dawadmi.

== Geography ==
Al-Dawadmi is one of the 22 governorates of the Riyadh Province, located in the Najd region in central Saudi Arabia. It covers an area of approximately 27,740 km^{2} (10,710 sq mi). It lies on the eastern edge of the Arabian-Nubian Shield. The average elevation is 940 m (3,080 ft) with the highest elevation at Jabal Al-Nir in the west at 1,307 m (4,288 ft) and the lowest elevation at 660 m (2,170 ft) in the northeast. It borders the governorate of Shaqra and the administrative territory of Marat to the east, the governorates of Afif to the west, Ar Rass to the northwest, Unayzah, Al Mithnab and Al Bukayriyah to the north, and Al-Quway'iyah to the south.

== Demographics ==
In 2010, the governorate had a population of 216,811 inhabitants. According to the 2022 census, the population had increased to 200,620.
