= Shanan, Saudi Arabia =

City and Governorate in Hail Province, Saudi Arabia

Shanan Governorate محافظة الشنان
- City and Governorate
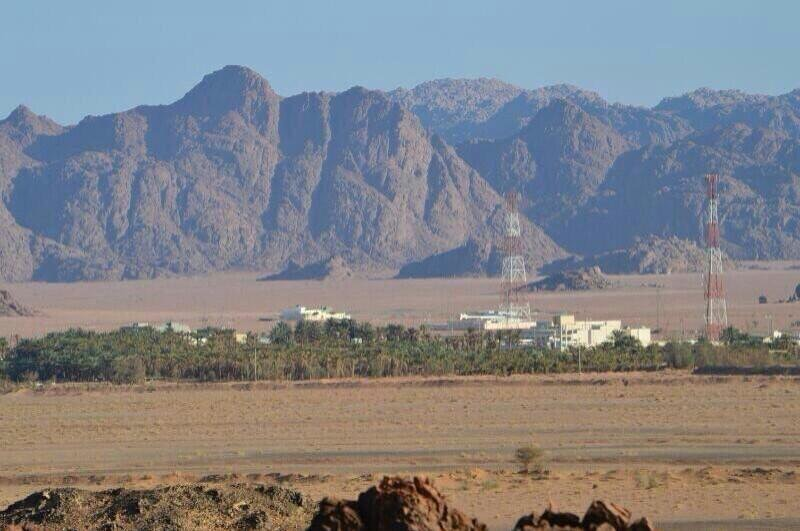
- Al-Sab'an town

- Location of Shanan governorate within Hail Province

- Location of Shanan within Saudi Arabia
- Coordinates: 27°05′00″N 42°25′00″E
- Country: Saudi Arabia
- Province: Hail Province
- Region: Najd
- Markaz: 8
- Seat: Shanan City

Government
  - Type: Municipality
  - Body: Shanan Municipality
  - Governor: Abdullah Suleiman

Area
  - City and Governorate: 23.3411 km^{2} (9.0120 sq mi)

Population (2022)
  - Metro: 29,419 (Shanan Governorate)
- Time zone: UTC+03:00 (SAST)
- Area code: 016

Shanan (Arabic: الشنان, romanized: Ash-Shanān) is a city and governorate in Hail Province, Saudi Arabia.

== Population ==
Historical population
| Year | Pop. | ±% p.a. |
|---|---|---|
| 2010 | 44,344 | — |
| 2022 | 29,419 | −3.36% |

== Governor ==
- Abdullah Suleiman (February 2023–present)

== Transportation ==
=== Air ===
Shanan Governorate is primarily served by Hail International Airport, which handles domestic flights to major Saudi cities as well as limited international connections. The airport is conveniently accessible from Shanan by road, making it the main gateway for air travel in the governorate.

=== Rail ===
Residents of Shanan can access the national railway network through Hail railway station, situated in Hail city on the Riyadh–Qurayyat railway operated by Saudi Arabia Railways. This rail link provides regular service to major urban centers such as Riyadh, Al-Qassim, Al-Jawf, and Qurayyat, facilitating both passenger and freight travel.

== See also ==
- Provinces of Saudi Arabia
- List of governorates of Saudi Arabia
- List of cities and towns in Saudi Arabia
