= As Sulayyil =

Governorate in Riyadh Province, Saudi Arabia

Al-Sulayyil السليل
- Governorate
- Location of Al-Sulayyil Governorate within Riyadh Province

- Location within Saudi Arabia
- Country: Saudi Arabia
- Province: Riyadh Province
- Region: Najd
- Seat: Al-Sulayyil City

Government
  - Type: Municipality
  - Body: Al-Sulayyil Municipality

Area
  - Total: 58,000 km^{2} (22,000 sq mi)

Population (2022)
  - Total: 35,271
- Time zone: UTC+03:00 (SAST)
- ISO 3166-2: SA-01
- Area code: 011

Al-Sulayyil (Arabic: السليل), is a governorate in Riyadh Province, Saudi Arabia. It is located in the southern part of the province.

== See also ==
- Provinces of Saudi Arabia
- List of governorates of Saudi Arabia
- List of cities and towns in Saudi Arabia
