= Ad-Dilam =

Governorate in Riyadh Province, Saudi Arabia

Ad-Dilam الدلم
- Governorate
- Location of Ad-Dilam Governorate within the Riyadh Province

- Location within Saudi Arabia
- Coordinates: 23°58′57″N 47°9′2″E
- Country: Saudi Arabia
- Province: Riyadh Province
- Region: Najd
- Seat: Ad-Dilam City

Government
  - Type: Municipality
  - Body: Ad-Dilam Municipality

Population (2022)
  - Total: 54,822
- Time zone: UTC+03:00 (SAST)
- ISO 3166-2: SA-01
- Area code: 011

Ad-Dilam, (Note: Also spelled Al-Dilam; Arabic: الدلم) is a governorate in Riyadh Province, Saudi Arabia. It was granted governorate status in 11 March 2017. Its administrative seat is the city of Ad-Dilam. The governorate is located within the historical region of Najd.

== History ==
The governorate was the site of the Battle of Dilam in 1903, one of the earliest battles in the unification of Saudi Arabia, involving the Third Saudi State and the Emirate of Jabal Shammar, which was supported by the Ottoman Empire.

== See also ==
- Provinces of Saudi Arabia
- List of governorates of Saudi Arabia
- List of cities and towns in Saudi Arabia
