= Shaqra (Saudi Arabia) =

Governorate in Riyadh Province, Saudi Arabia

Shaqra شقراء
- Governorate
- Location of Shaqra Governorate within Riyadh Province

- Location within Saudi Arabia
- Country: Saudi Arabia
- Province: Riyadh Province
- Region: Najd
- Seat: Shaqra City

Government
  - Type: Municipality
  - Body: Shaqra Municipality

Area
  - Total: 4,110 km^{2} (1,590 sq mi)

Population (2022)
  - Total: 46,403
  - Density: 11.3/km^{2} (29.2/sq mi)
- Time zone: UTC+03:00 (SAST)
- ISO 3166-2: SA-01
- Area code: 011

Shaqra (Arabic: شقراء) is a governorate in Riyadh Province, Saudi Arabia. It is located approximately 180 km (110 mi) northwest of Riyadh. The governorate covers an area of approximately 4,110 km^{2} (1,590 sq mi) and had a population of 46,403 according to the 2022 census.

== History ==
Shaqra has several historical monuments which include several buildings and other structures within the heritage city of Shagra. It is representative of the Najd architecture. The wall of Shaqra, which stretches for approximately 1.5 km (0.93 mi), was constructed in 1817. It contains two main gates, Bab al-Manakh and Bab al-Aqda, and 27 watchtowers. As the town expanded, a second wall was added in 1901.

According to John Lorimer in 1908, Shaqra was described as a principal center in the Washm district in southern Najd. He describes it as surrounded by a fortified wall with four gates and consisted of extensive date palms and numerous wells. It had an estimated population of approximately 3,000, and the inhabitants were engaged in agriculture, animal husbandry, and trade, particularly with Kuwait, and its bazaar contained numerous shops.

Al-Subaie Palace is located in the southwestern part of the old town of Shaqra. It served as one of the residences of King Abdulaziz of Saudi Arabia during his journeys between Riyadh and the Hijaz region, as well as the headquarters of Bayt al-Mal and a center for military preparations during the unification of Saudi Arabia. The governorate includes the city of Ushaiger, which is the original home of the House of Thani, the ruling family of Qatar.

== Geography ==
Shaqra is one of the 22 governorates of Riyadh Province. Situated approximately 180 km (110 mi) northwest of Riyadh, the governorate covers an area of approximately 4,110 km^{2} (1,590 sq mi). It borders Al-Majma'ah and Al-Ghat governorates and Al-Qassim Province to the north, and the governorates of Thadiq to the east, Marat to the south, and Al-Dawadmi to the west. It comprises eleven administrative centers.

== Demographics and economy ==
According to the 2010 census, the governorate had a population of 40,824 inhabitants, which increased to 46,403 inhabitants in 2022.

Agriculture is a major economic activity in Shaqra Governorate. The governorate contributed nearly 78% of Saudi Arabia's total chilli pepper production. The annual Shaqra Pepper Festival is held to market the produce and promote pepper cultivation in the region. Two poultry feed production plants were inaugurated in 2025. Shaqra is home to Shaqra University, a public university established by royal decree on 24 August 2009.

== See also ==
- Provinces of Saudi Arabia
- List of governorates of Saudi Arabia
- List of cities and towns in Saudi Arabia
