= Ain Hussain =

Ain Hussain عين حسين
- Village
- Location within Saudi Arabia
- Coordinates: 24.38324°N 38.47365°E
- State: Saudi Arabia
- Subdivision: Yanbu
- Region: Al Madinah Region

Population (2006)
  - Total: 5,756
- Time zone: UTC+3 (AST)

Ain Hussain (Arabic: عين حسين) is one of Yanbu Al-Nakhil (Arabic: ينبع النخل) villages, located in Yanbu, Al Madinah Region, Saudi Arabia.

The village is southwest of Medina, and north of Yanbu Al-Nakhil village.

== Etymology ==
The word "Ain" (Arabic: عين) has different meanings in ِArabic. It would refer to: eye, threading hole, essence, substance, spy, guard, lookout, watch(man), interest, usury, spring or water well and more.

Ain Hussain refers to a spring named after Husayn ibn Ali (His name also spelled as "Husain", "Hussain" or "Hussein"), the grandson of Islamic Nabi, Muhammad.
