= Al Kamil, Makkah =

Governorate of Saudi Arabia

Al Kamil الكامل
- Governorate
- Location in Saudi Arabia
- Coordinates: 22°16′N 39°48′E
- Country: Saudi Arabia
- Region: Makkah Region
- Time zone: UTC+3 (EAT)
  - Summer (DST): UTC+3 (EAT)

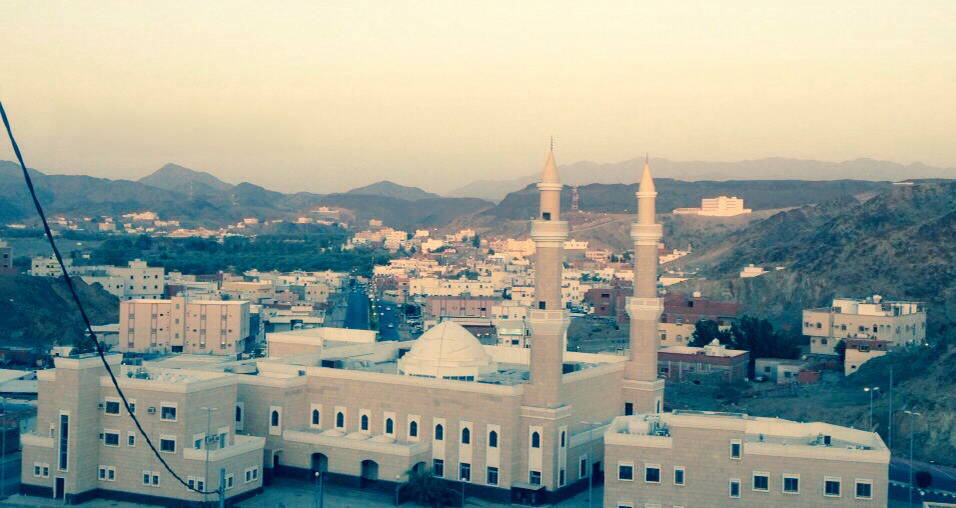
Al Kamil photograph

Al Kamil (Arabic: الكامل) is one of the governorates in Makkah Region, Saudi Arabia.
