= Al Shimasiyah =

Al Shimasiyah محافظة الشماسية
- Governorate
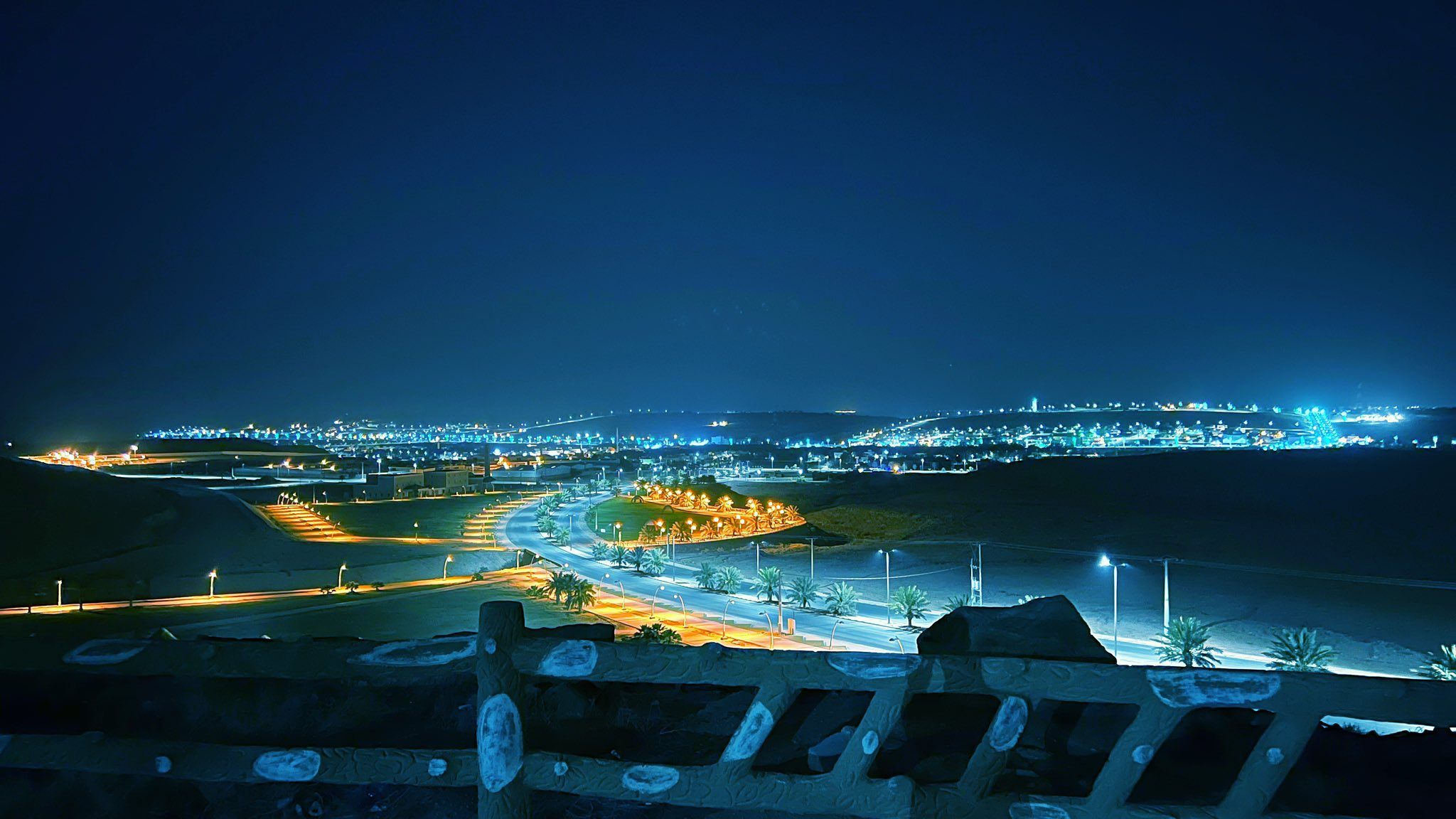
- Al Shimasiyah Line view

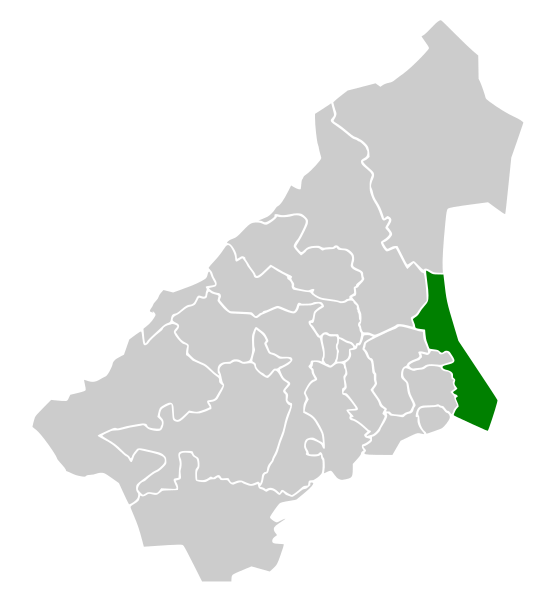
- The location of Al-Shamasiyah Governorate and other governorates in the Al-Qassim region
- Country: Saudi Arabia
- Region: Al-Qassim Region
- Founder: Al Shammas bin Ghanem

Population (2010)
  - Total: 10,605
- Time zone: UTC+3 (EAT)
  - Summer (DST): UTC+3 (EAT)

Al-Shamasiyah Governorate is one of the governorates of the Al-Qassim region in the Kingdom of Saudi Arabia, and it is the eastern front of Al-Qassim. The governorate is famous for its cultivation, especially palm trees, and is considered a tourist destination for residents and visitors to the area in the spring.

== Administrative division ==
The governorate is classified as Category B, and a number of villages and centers are affiliated to it. The governor is Fahd bin Radi Al-Radi. Shammasiya has a population of approximately 15,000.

=== Shammasiyah Municipality ===
A village complex for the Shamasiyah governorate was approved in the budget of the fiscal year 1397/1398 AH and began its work on Muharram 1, 1398 AH. With its services, it included the governorate of Oyoun Al-Jawa in the north, the center of Uqlat Al-Suqur in the west, and the center of Drayeh in the south. When the number of municipalities increased, the municipality's services were limited to the governorate of Al-Shamasiyah and its affiliated villages, extending north and south with a length of 100 km (62 mi), starting from the center of Umm Hazm in the south to the center of Nabqiah in the north and extending east and west with a length of 50 km (31 mi), starting from The revolutionaries ran from the east to the orphan in the west.

=== Affiliated states ===
- Al Rubiyah
- Al Nabqiyah
- Umm Hazm
- Umm Taliha
- Al Sarout
- Al Barjisyat
- Al Rualiyah
- Umm Sidrah
- Al Rikiah
- Al Aweqila
- Al Ruwaidat
- Al Duwaihra
- Al Rikibinia
- Al Mustawi

=== Economy ===
Shamsiya governorate depends on agriculture, especially palm and wheat. It is considered an oasis filled with palm trees, and its people depend on growing wheat in the rain.
