= Huraymila =

Governorate in Riyadh Province, Saudi Arabia

Huraymila حريملاء
- Governorate
- Location of Huraymila Governorate within Riyadh Province

- Location within Saudi Arabia
- Country: Saudi Arabia
- Province: Riyadh Province
- Region: Najd
- Seat: Huraymila City

Government
  - Type: Municipality
  - Body: Huraymila Municipality

Population (2022)
  - Total: 21,758
- Time zone: UTC+03:00 (SAST)
- ISO 3166-2: SA-01
- Area code: 011

Huraymila (Arabic: حريملاء), is a governorate in Riyadh Province, Saudi Arabia. It is located in the northwestern part of the province.

== See also ==
- Provinces of Saudi Arabia
- List of governorates of Saudi Arabia
- List of cities and towns in Saudi Arabia
