= Al-Badai' =

Al Badayea محافظة البدائع
- Governorate
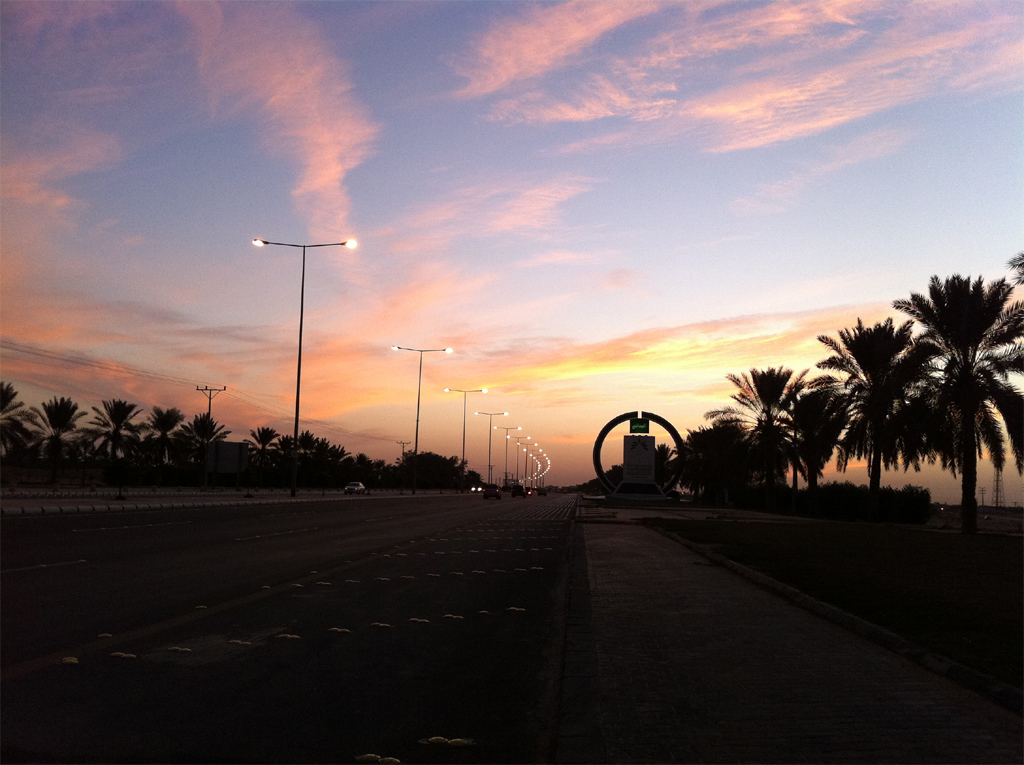
- The main street of Badayea city, view at night
- Country: Saudi Arabia
- Region: Al-Qassim Region

Population (2016)
  - Total: 57,164
- Time zone: UTC+3 (EAT)
  - Summer (DST): UTC+3 (EAT)

Al Badayea (Arabic: البدائع) is one of the governorates in Al-Qassim Region, Saudi Arabia. Its area is 1,600 km^{2} (620 sq mi) and the population is 57,164 people. Al Badayea considered to be one of the agricultural governorates in Qassim, as it is located in the middle of Al Qassim.
