= Tathlith Governorate =

Governorate of Saudi Arabia

Coordinates: 19.533°N 43.503°E

Tathlith تثليث
- Governorate
- Interactive map of Tathlith
- Country: Saudi Arabia
- Province: Asir Province

Population (2016)
  - Total: 53,224
- Time zone: UTC+3 (EAT)
  - Summer (DST): UTC+3 (EAT)

Tathlith is a Saudi Arabian governorate located within Asir Province. As of 2016, it had a population of 53,224 people, compared to 48,000 in 2004.

In 2018, Asir governor Faisal bin Khalid bin Abdulaziz introduced a $373 million project to conduct water to Tathlith and Bisha governorates from Rub' al Khali.
