= Afif =

Governorate in Riyadh Province, Saudi Arabia

Afif عفيف
- Governorate
- Location of Afif Governorate within Riyadh Province

- Location within Saudi Arabia
- Coordinates: 23°54′36″N 42°55′13″E
- Country: Saudi Arabia
- Province: Riyadh Province
- Region: Najd
- Founder: King Abdulaziz
- Seat: Afif City

Government
  - Type: Municipality
  - Body: Afif Municipality

Population (2022)
  - Total: 71,616
- Time zone: UTC+03:00 (SAST)
- ISO 3166-2: SA-01

Afif (Arabic: عفيف) is a governorate in Riyadh Province, Saudi Arabia. Its administrative seat is the city of Afif. The governorate is located within the historical region of Najd, approximately midway between Riyadh and Mecca.

== See also ==
- Provinces of Saudi Arabia
- List of governorates of Saudi Arabia
- List of cities and towns in Saudi Arabia
