= Al Majaridah =

Al-Majaridah
- Governorate
- محافظة المجاردة
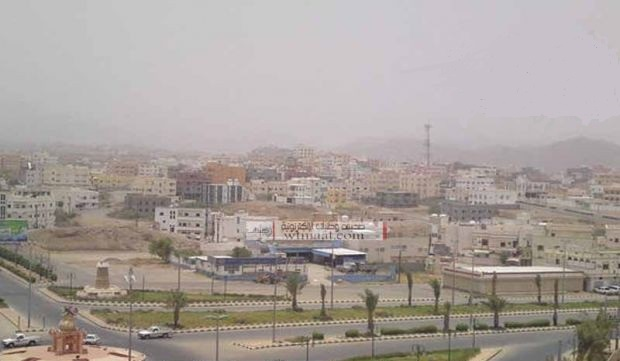

- Location in Saudi Arabia
- Coordinates: 19°07′N 41°55′E
- Country: Saudi Arabia
- Province: Asir Province

Population (2016)
  - Total: 53,629
- Time zone: UTC+3 (EAT)
  - Summer (DST): UTC+3 (EAT)

Al-Majaridah (Arabic: المجاردة) is one of the governorates in Asir Province, Saudi Arabia.
