= Al Harth =

Al Horrath Governorate of Saudi Arabia

Al Horrath
- Governorate
- Location in Saudi Arabia
- Coordinates: 16°48′N 43°09′E
- Country: Saudi Arabia
- Region: Jizan Region
- Time zone: UTC+3 (EAT)
  - Summer (DST): UTC+3 (EAT)

Al Horrath (Arabic: الحُرَّث) is one of the governorates in Jizan Region, Saudi Arabia.
