= Al-Muzahmiyya =

Governorate in Riyadh Province, Saudi Arabia

Al-Muzahmiyya المزاحمية
- Governorate
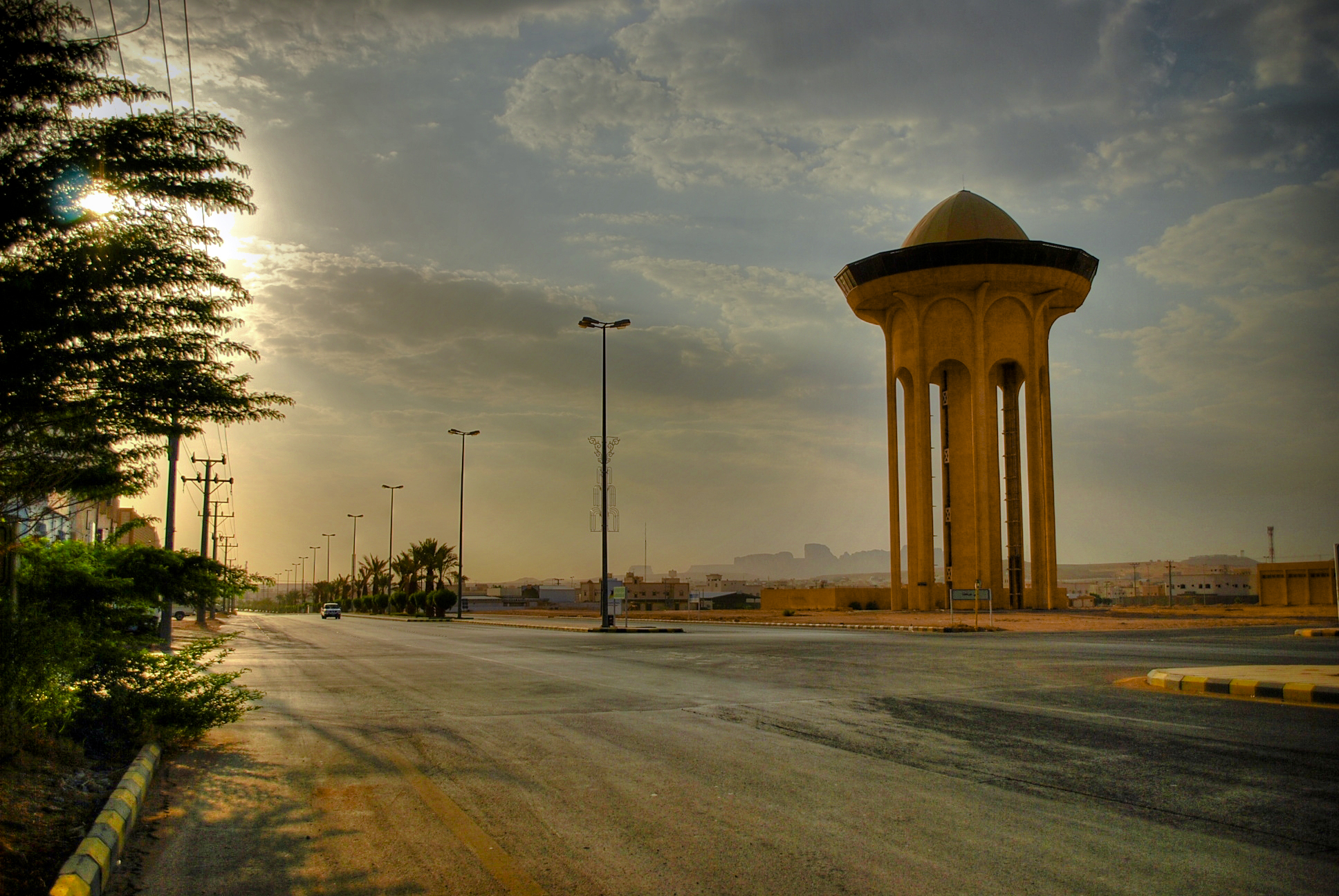
- Main street in Al-Muzahmiyya

- Location of Al-Muzahmiyya Governorate within Riyadh Province

- Location within Saudi Arabia
- Country: Saudi Arabia
- Province: Riyadh Province
- Region: Najd
- Seat: Al-Muzahmiyya City

Government
  - Type: Municipality
  - Body: Al-Muzahmiyya Municipality

Population (2022)
  - Total: 62,760
- Time zone: UTC+03:00 (SAST)
- ISO 3166-2: SA-01
- Area code: 011

Al-Muzahmiyya (Arabic: المزاحمية), is a governorate in Riyadh Province, Saudi Arabia. It is located in the western part of the province.

== See also ==
- Provinces of Saudi Arabia
- List of governorates of Saudi Arabia
- List of cities and towns in Saudi Arabia
