= Fayfa Governorate =

Fayfa Governorate محافظة فيفاء
- Governorate
- Location within Saudi Arabia
- Coordinates: 17.250°N 43.100°E
- Country: Saudi Arabia
- Region: Jazan Province
- Time zone: UTC+3 (EAT)
  - Summer (DST): UTC+3 (EAT)

Fayfa Governorate (Arabic: فيفاء) is one of the governorates in Jazan Province, Saudi Arabia.
