= Subdivisions of Saudi Arabia =

The Subdivisions of Saudi Arabia, officially the Organization of the Kingdom of Saudi Arabia, consist of 13 provinces which are further divided into 136 governorates. The current system was created by a series of royal orders and amendments in the early 1990s.

== Provinces ==
The Kingdom of Saudi Arabia is divided into 13 emirates (Arabic: إمارات, romanized: Imārāt sg. Arabic: إمارة, romanized: Imārah) or regions/provinces (Arabic: مناطق, romanized: manāṭiq), each governed by a governor or emir (Arabic: أمير, romanized: amīr, lit. 'prince'), known as the Provincial Governor, to differentiate them from the governors of governorates. These are:

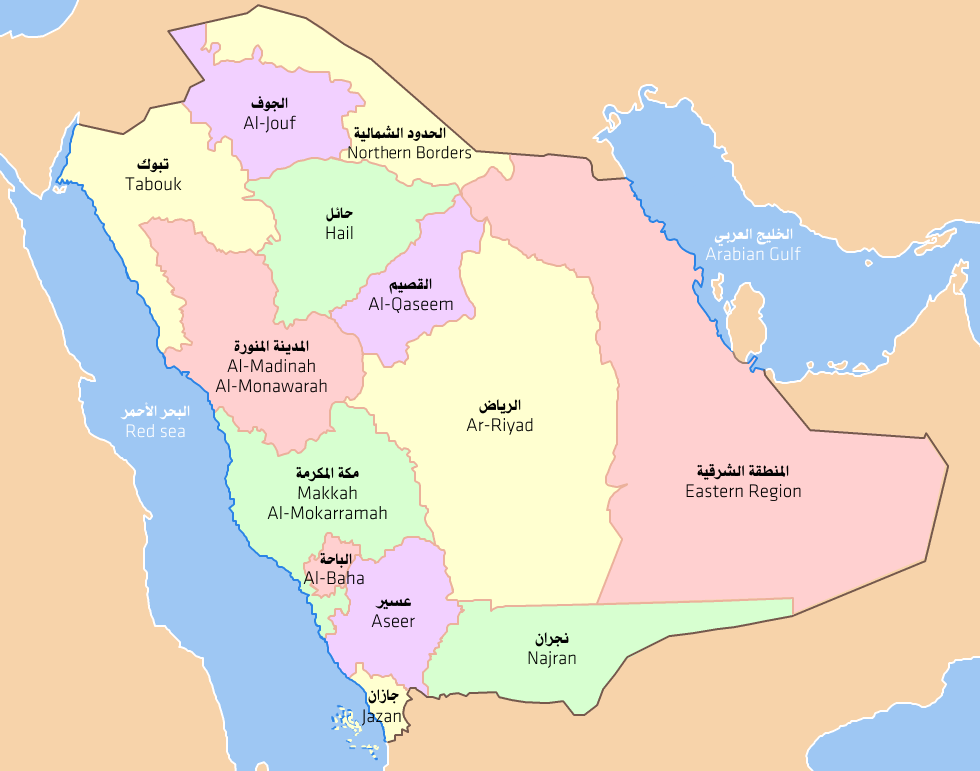
Provinces of Saudi Arabia

- the Emirate of the Riyadh Province
- the Emirate of the Makkah Province
- the Emirate of the Eastern Province
- the Emirate of the Madinah Province
- the Emirate of the Al Baha Province
- the Emirate of the Al Jawf Province
- the Emirate of the Northern Borders Province
- the Emirate of the Qassim Province
- the Emirate of the Ha'il Province
- the Emirate of the Tabuk Province
- the Emirate of the 'Aseer Province
- the Emirate of the Jizan Province
- the Emirate of the Najran Province

== Governorates ==
The 13 emirates are further divided into 136 governorates (Arabic: محافظات, lit. 'muḥafazāt' sg. Arabic: محافظة, lit. 'muḥafazah'), each governed by a Governor (Arabic: محافظ, romanized: muḥāfiz). Of these, 13 are capital governorates (Arabic: أمانات, romanized: amānāt sg. Arabic: أمانة, romanized: amānah) governed by a Mayor (Arabic: أمين, romanized: amīn).

Governorates of Saudi Arabia محافظات المملكة العربية السعودية
Emirate	Governorate	Population (2004)	Total Population
Makkah Province	Jeddah Governorate	2,833,169	5,747,971
Makkah Province	City of Makkah	1,338,341	5,747,971
Makkah Province	Ta'if Governorate	885,474	5,747,971
Makkah Province	Qunfudhah Governorate	240,938	5,747,971
Makkah Province	Laith Governorate	110,449	5,747,971
Makkah Province	Jumum Governorate	75,993	5,747,971
Makkah Province	Rabigh Governorate	68,966	5,747,971
Makkah Province	Khulays Governorate	49,955	5,747,971
Makkah Province	Ranyah Governorate	44,276	5,747,971
Makkah Province	Turbah Governorate	42,810	5,747,971
Makkah Province	Khurmah Governorate	39,053	5,747,971
Makkah Province	Kamil Governorate	18,547	5,747,971
Riyadh Province	City of Riyadh	4,137,280	5,455,363
Riyadh Province	Kharj Governorate	323,394	5,455,363
Riyadh Province	Duwaidmi Governorate	190,138	5,455,363
Riyadh Province	Majma'ah Governorate	111,503	5,455,363
Riyadh Province	Quwai'iyah Governorate	106,579	5,455,363
Riyadh Province	Wadi ad-Dawasir Governorate	92,631	5,455,363
Riyadh Province	'Afif Governorate	68,592	5,455,363
Riyadh Province	Zulfi Governorate	62,904	5,455,363
Riyadh Province	Dir'iyah Governorate	60,777	5,455,363
Riyadh Province	Aflaj Governorate	60,046	5,455,363
Riyadh Province	Hawtat Bani Tamim Governorate	39,719	5,455,363
Riyadh Province	Muzahmiyah Governorate	35,795	5,455,363
Riyadh Province	Sulayyil Governorate	35,011	5,455,363
Riyadh Province	Shaqra' Governorate	34,543	5,455,363
Riyadh Province	Rumah Governorate	25,312	5,455,363
Riyadh Province	Dhurma Governorate	19,688	5,455,363
Riyadh Province	Thadij Governorate	15,221	5,455,363
Riyadh Province	Hariq Governorate	13,426	5,455,363
Riyadh Province	Huraymila Governorate	12,569	5,455,363
Riyadh Province	Ghat Governorate	10,235	5,455,363
Eastern Province	Ahsa' Governorate	908,366	3,360,157
Eastern Province	City of Dammam	744,631	3,360,157
Eastern Province	Qatif Governorate	474,573	3,360,157
Eastern Province	Khobar Governorate	455,541	3,360,157
Eastern Province	Hafr al-Batin Governorate	338,636	3,360,157
Eastern Province	Jubail Governorate	224,430	3,360,157
Eastern Province	Khafji Governorate	60,975	3,360,157
Eastern Province	Buqayq Governorate	44,863	3,360,157
Eastern Province	Na'iriyah Governorate	44,664	3,360,157
Eastern Province	Ra's Tanura Governorate	43,338	3,360,157
Eastern Province	Qaryat al-'Ulya Governorate	20,140	3,360,157
Madinah Province	City of Madinah	994,175	1,512,076
Madinah Province	Yanbu' al-Bahr Governorate	250,244	1,512,076
Madinah Province	Badr Governorate	58,352	1,512,076
Madinah Province	'Alula Governorate	57,506	1,512,076
Madinah Province	Mahd Governorate	53,734	1,512,076
Madinah Province	Henakiyah Governorate	52,524	1,512,076
Madinah Province	Khaybar Governorate	45,541	1,512,076
Al Baha Province	City of Baha	93,128	377,739
Al Baha Province	Mukhwah Governorate	64,365	377,739
Al Baha Province	Baljurashi Governorate	61,354	377,739
Al Baha Province	Qilwah Governorate	55,511	377,739
Al Baha Province	Mandaq Governorate	45,666	377,739
Al Baha Province	Qari Governorate	29,109	377,739
Al Baha Province	'Aqiq Governorate	28,606	377,739
Al Jawf Province	City of Sakaka	196,503	361,676
Al Jawf Province	Qurayyat Governorate	125,090	361,676
Al Jawf Province	Daumat al-Jandal Governorate	40,083	361,676
Northern Borders Province	City of 'Ar'ar	166,428	279,286
Northern Borders Province	Rafha Governorate	72,187	279,286
Northern Borders Province	Turaif Governorate	40,671	279,286

== See also ==
- Provinces of Saudi Arabia, the historical four provinces
- List of governorates of Saudi Arabia
- ISO 3166-2:SA, the ISO 3166-2 codes for the regions
