= List of governorates of Saudi Arabia =

Second-level administrative divisions of Saudi Arabia

Governorates of the Kingdom of Saudi Arabia
- Native name: محافظات المملكة العربية السعودية
- Type: Second-level administrative division
- Country: Saudi Arabia
- Number: 140
- Subdivisions: Markazes
- Government: Appointed governors
- Largest governorate: Al-Ahsa (375,000 km²)
- Smallest governorate: Fayfa (160 km²)

The governorates of Saudi Arabia (Arabic: محافظات), are the second-level administrative divisions of the Kingdom of Saudi Arabia. They are subdivisions of the country's 13 provinces and are further divided into markazes.

== History ==
The Provinces System was established in 1992 under a royal order by King Fahd, initially creating 118 governorates. The system aimed to decentralize governance and improve administrative efficiency by expanding local authority and responsibility. In 2012, under the rule of King Abdullah, the number of governorates was increased to 136 to reflect the country's demographic and geographic developments.

== Classification ==
Governorates are classified based on population, availability of public services, geographic and environmental factors, and transportation infrastructure into two levels: Governorate (A) and Governorate (B).

This classification is established in Article 3 of the Provinces System issued by King Fahd in 1992 and amended in 1993.

== Governorates ==
=== Tabuk Province ===
Map of Tabuk Province

Governorate	Category	Population (2022)
Umluj	A	69,656
Al-Wajh	A	49,948
Duba	A	54,917
Tayma	A	42,165
Haql	B	27,712
Al-Bad'	B	17,973

=== Hail Province ===
Map of Hail Province

Governorate	Category	Population (2022)
Hait	B	74,596
Baqaa	A	56,362
Shanan	B	29,419
Shamli	B	20,946
Sumairah	B	19,563
Sulaimi	B	17,343
Mawqaq	B	16,835
Ghazalah	B	12,767

=== Northern Borders Province ===
Map of Northern Borders Province

Governorate	Category	Population (2022)
Rafha	A	84,536
Turaif	A	66,004
Al-Uwayqilah	B	20,318

=== Medina Province ===
Map of Medina Province

Governorate	Category	Population (2022)
Yanbu	A	359,631
al-Ula	A	60,103
Badr	B	58,259
Mahd	A	48,590
Khaybar	B	45,532
Al-Hunakiyah	A	43,256
Wadi al-Fara	B	23,120
Al-Ais	B	22,445

=== Eastern Province ===
Map of Eastern Province

Governorate	Category	Population (2022)
Al-Ahsa	A	1,104,267
Khobar	A	658,550
Qatif	A	552,442
Jubail	A	505,162
Hafar al-Batin	A	467,007
Khafji	A	84,316
Nariyah	B	63,815
Abqaiq	B	64,632
Ras Tanura	B	62,314
Qaryat al-Ulya	B	21,788
Al-Udeid	B	8,635
Al-Bayda	B	—

=== Najran Province ===
Map of Najran Province

Governorate	Category	Population (2022)
Sharurah	A	100,199
Habona	B	24,823
Yadamah	B	16,160
Thar	B	13,391
Badr Al-Janub	B	7,991
Khubash	B	7,834

=== Al-Jouf Province ===
Map of Al-Jouf Province

Governorate	Category	Population (2022)
Qurayyat	A	195,016
Dumat al-Jandal	A	54,341
Tabarjal	B	109,796
Suwayr	B	–

=== Al-Qassim Province ===
Map of Al-Qassim Province

Governorate	Category	Population (2022)
Unaizah	A	184,644
Ar Rass	A	121,359
Al-Bukiryah	A	63,551
Al-Badai'	A	53,779
Al-Mithnab	A	43,278
Al-Nabhaniyah	B	46,558
Asyah	B	35,533
Riyadh Al-Khabra	B	31,203
Uyun Al-Jiwa	B	29,178
Dhariyah	B	20,826
Uqlat Al-Suqur	B	20,805
Al-Shimasiyah	B	7,818
Abanat	B	—

=== Al-Baha Province ===
Map of Al-Baha Province

Governorate	Category	Population (2022)
Baljurashi	A	51,787
Al-Mikhwah	A	48,333
Al-Aqiq	B	37,608
Qilwah	B	31,197
Al-Mandaq	A	20,010
Al-Qura	B	19,586
Bani Hasan	B	15,496
Far'at Ghamid az-Zinad	B	12,506
Al-Hujrah	B	12,136

=== Mecca Province ===
Map of Mecca Province

Governorate	Category	Population (2022)
Jeddah	A	3,751,722
Taif	A	913,374
Al-Qunfudhah	A	205,188
Rabigh	A	112,383
Bahrah	A	94,603
Al-Jumum	B	89,575
Al-Lith	A	73,753
Al-Ardiyat	B	65,078
Khulays	A	51,338
Ranyah	A	49,854
Turubah	A	41,769
Al-Khurmah	A	38,744
Adum	B	33,958
Al-Muwayh	B	29,065
Maysan	B	28,765
Al-Kamil	B	14,370

=== Riyadh Province ===
Map of Riyadh Province

Governorate	Category	Population (2022)
Al-Kharj	A	373,177
Al-Dawadmi	A	200,620
Majmaah	A	151,877
Diriyah	A	95,834
Wadi Al-Dawasir	A	91,535
Al-Zulfi	A	74,903
Afif	A	71,616
Al-Quway'iyah	A	71,410
Al-Muzahmiyya	B	62,760
Al-Dilam	B	54,822
Al-Aflaj	A	54,544
Shaqra	A	46,403
Hotat Bani Tamim	A	41,854
Rimah	B	35,683
Al-Sulayyil	B	35,271
Al-Rayn	B	28,243
Dhurma	B	26,299
Huraymila	B	21,758
Thadig	B	12,510
Al-Ghat	A	10,799
Al-Hariq	B	10,864
Marat	B	9,846

=== Asir Province ===
Map of Asir Province

Governorate	Category	Population (2022)
Khamis Mushait	A	601,305
Muhayil	A	230,537
Bisha	A	202,096
Ahad Rafidah	B	107,894
Balqarn	B	60,012
Sarat Ubaida	B	57,123
Rijal Almaa	B	50,825
Al-Majaridah	B	48,302
Bariq	B	44,880
Al-Namas	A	38,409
Tathlith	A	36,451
Dhahran Al-Janub	A	32,099
Al-Birk	B	22,583
Tarib	B	22,298
Al-Harjah	B	18,503
Tanomah	B	17,756
Al-Amwah	B	10,969

=== Jazan Province ===
Map of Jazan Province

Governorate	Category	Population (2022)
Sabya	A	223,083
Abu 'Arish	A	187,060
Samtah	A	154,926
Ahad Al-Masarihah	B	130,545
Baish	B	86,996
Al-Ardah	B	79,730
Al-Darb	B	68,965
Damad	B	64,136
Al-Dayer	B	47,424
Al-Tuwal	B	36,259
Al-Eidabi	B	32,940
Harub	B	30,709
Fayfa	B	19,346
Ar Rayth	B	16,877
Farasan Islands	B	13,529
Al-Harth	B	11,561

== Defunct governorates ==
- Al-Kharkhir Governorate of Najran Province was the only Saudi governorate to be abolished by royal decree in 2014, with its administrative centres and population transferred to Sharurah Governorate.

== See also ==
- Provinces of Saudi Arabia
- Subdivisions of Saudi Arabia
- List of islands of Saudi Arabia
- List of cities and towns in Saudi Arabia
