= Al Mithnab =

Al Mithnab محافظة المذنب
- Governorate
- Al Mithnab
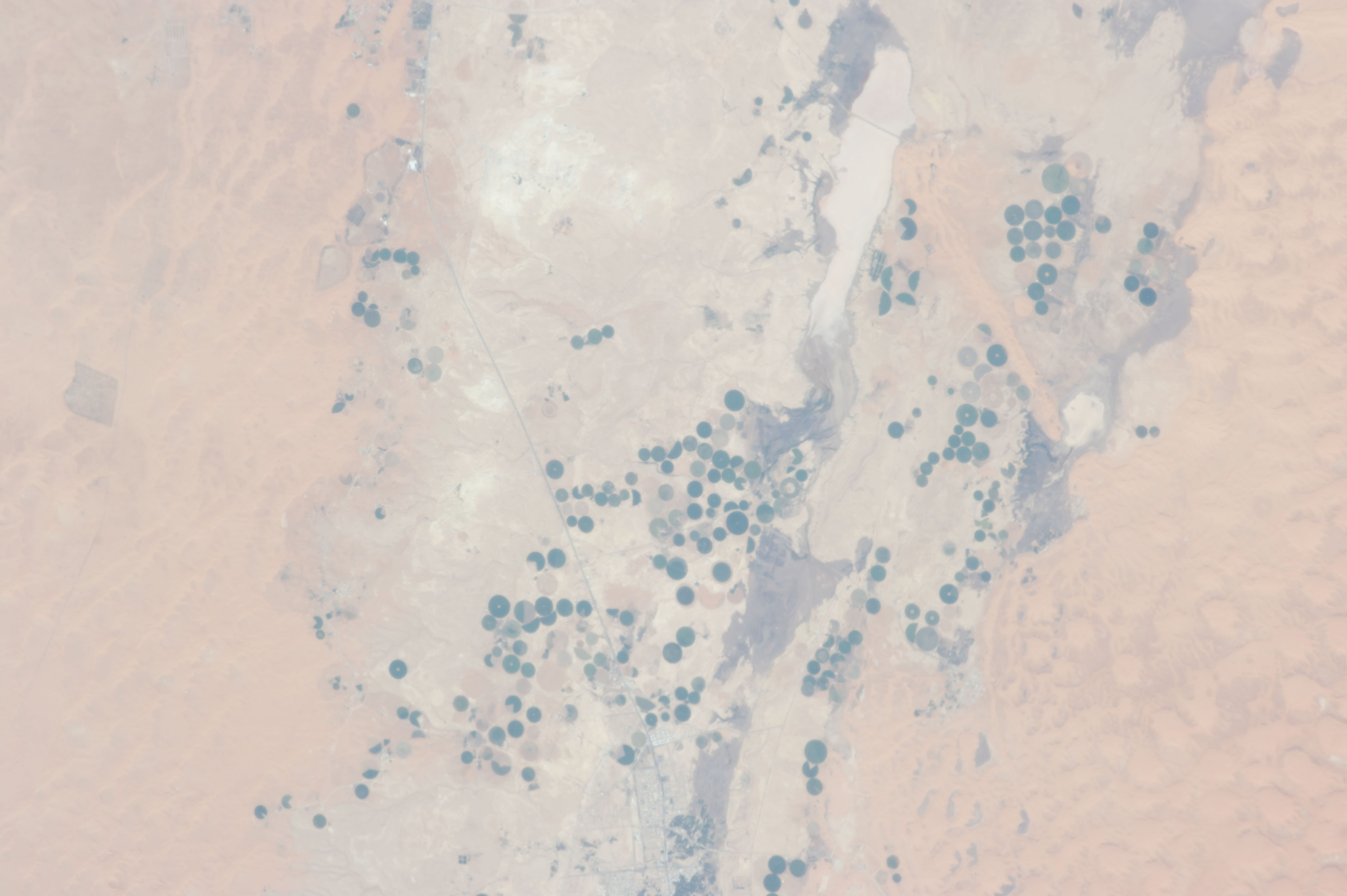

- Location within Saudi Arabia Location within Middle East
- Coordinates: 25°51′36″N 44°13′20″E
- Country: Saudi Arabia
- Region: Al-Qassim Region
- Elevation: 632 m (2,073 ft)

Population
  - Total: 44,043
- Time zone: UTC+3 (AST)
  - Summer (DST): UTC+3 (AST)

Al Mithnab (Arabic: المذنب) is one of the governorates and a major cultural and historical hub in Al-Qassim Region, Saudi Arabia.. Sitting about 65 kilometers south of Buraydah, this central oasis is best known for its agricultural roots and award winning heritage preservation efforts. Also it is the 4th biggest governorates in Al-Qassim Province and 7th in population.
