= Ranyah =

Governorate of Saudi Arabia

- Governorate
- Ranyah's location inside Saudi Arabia
- Coordinates: 21°15′14″N 41°52′3″E
- Country: Saudi Arabia
- Region: Makkah Region

Area
  - Total: 24,000 sq mi (62,000 km^{2})

Population (2020)
  - Total: 120,000
- Time zone: UTC+3 (EAT)
  - Summer (DST): UTC+3 (EAT)

Ranyah (Arabic: رنية) is a governorate in Najd in Saudi Arabia, located in the valley of the same name. Ranyah's population in 2010 was 45,942.
