= Riyadh Province =

Province of Saudi Arabia

Riyadh Province منطقة الرياض
- Province
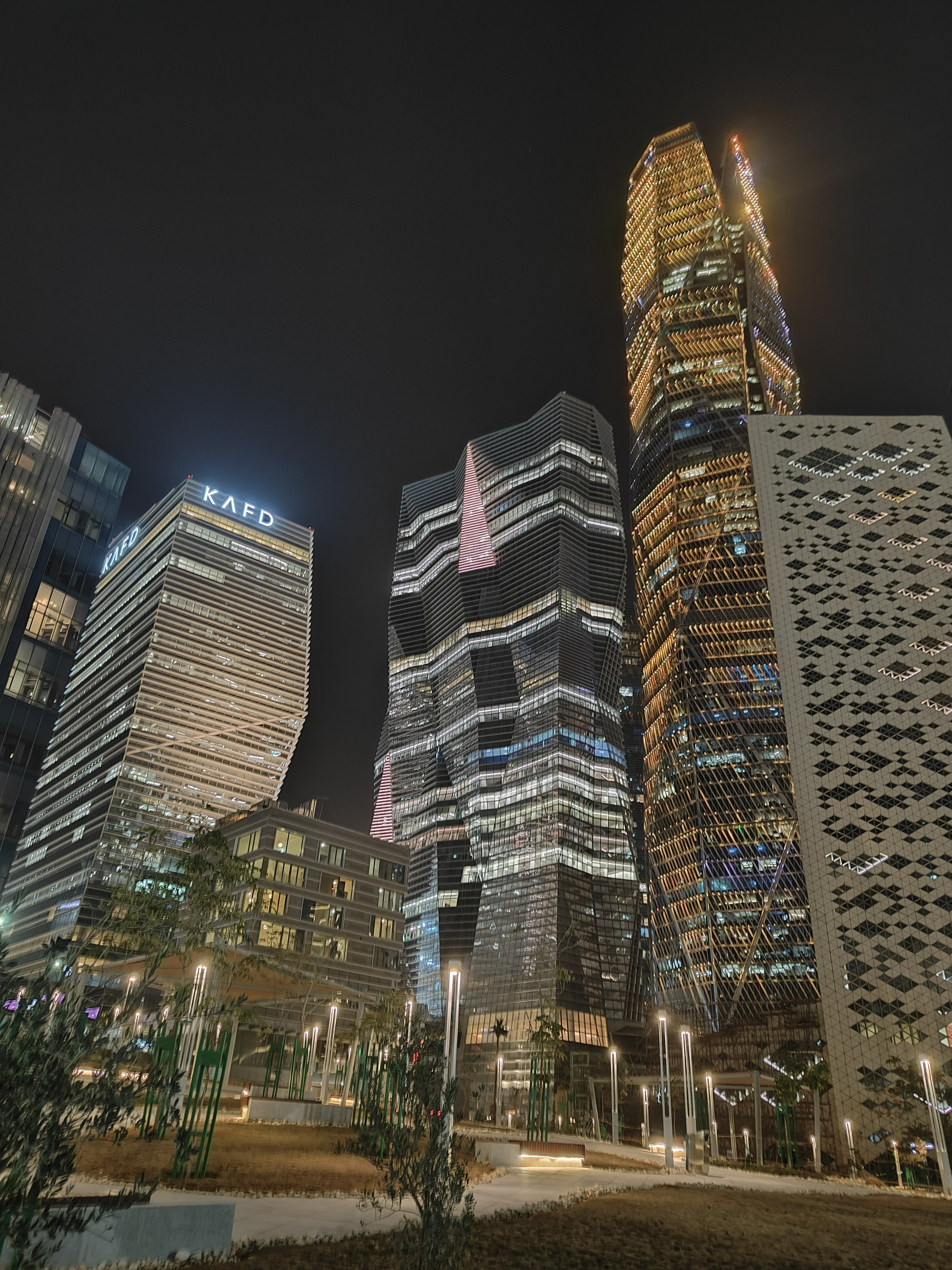
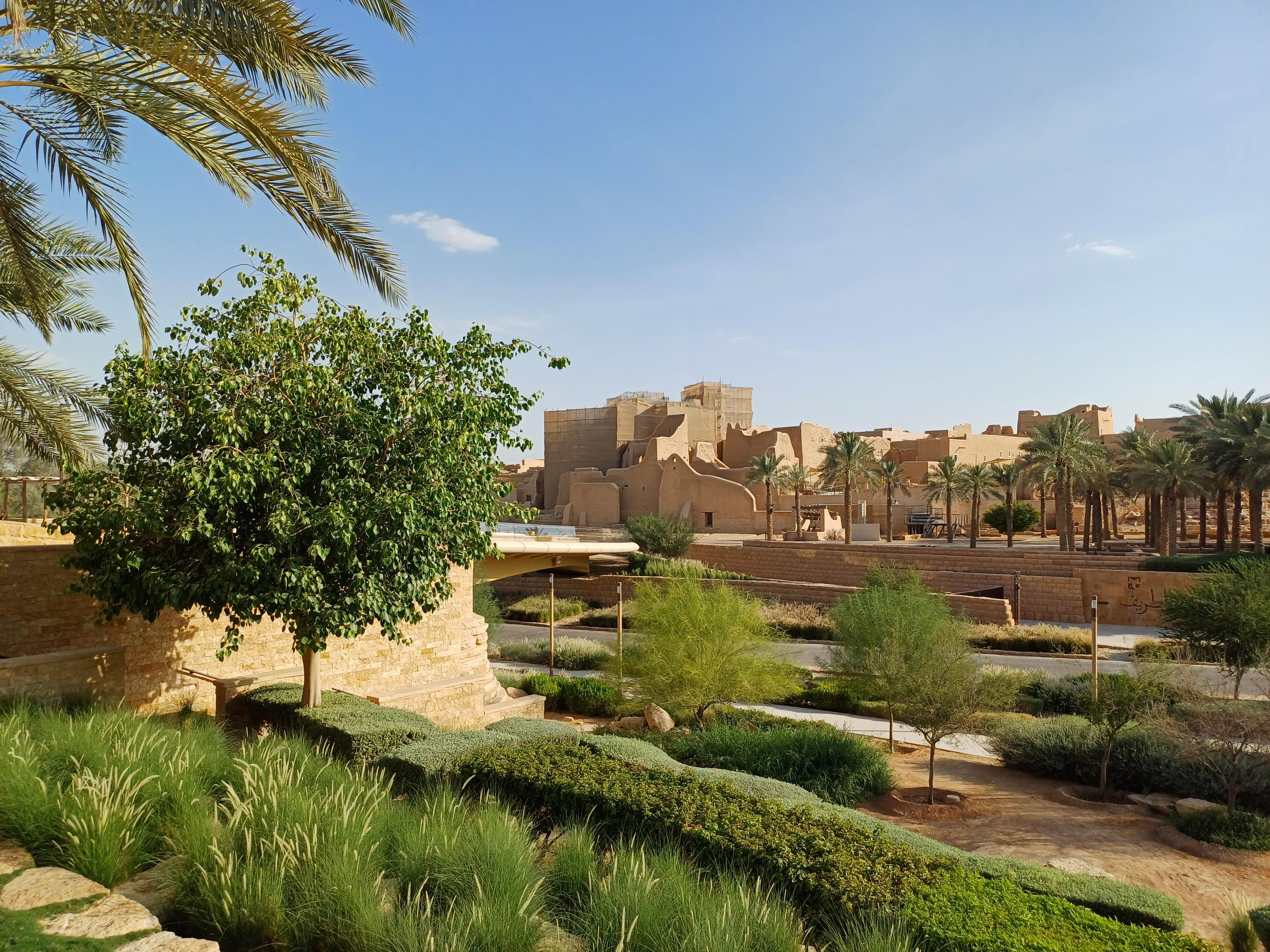
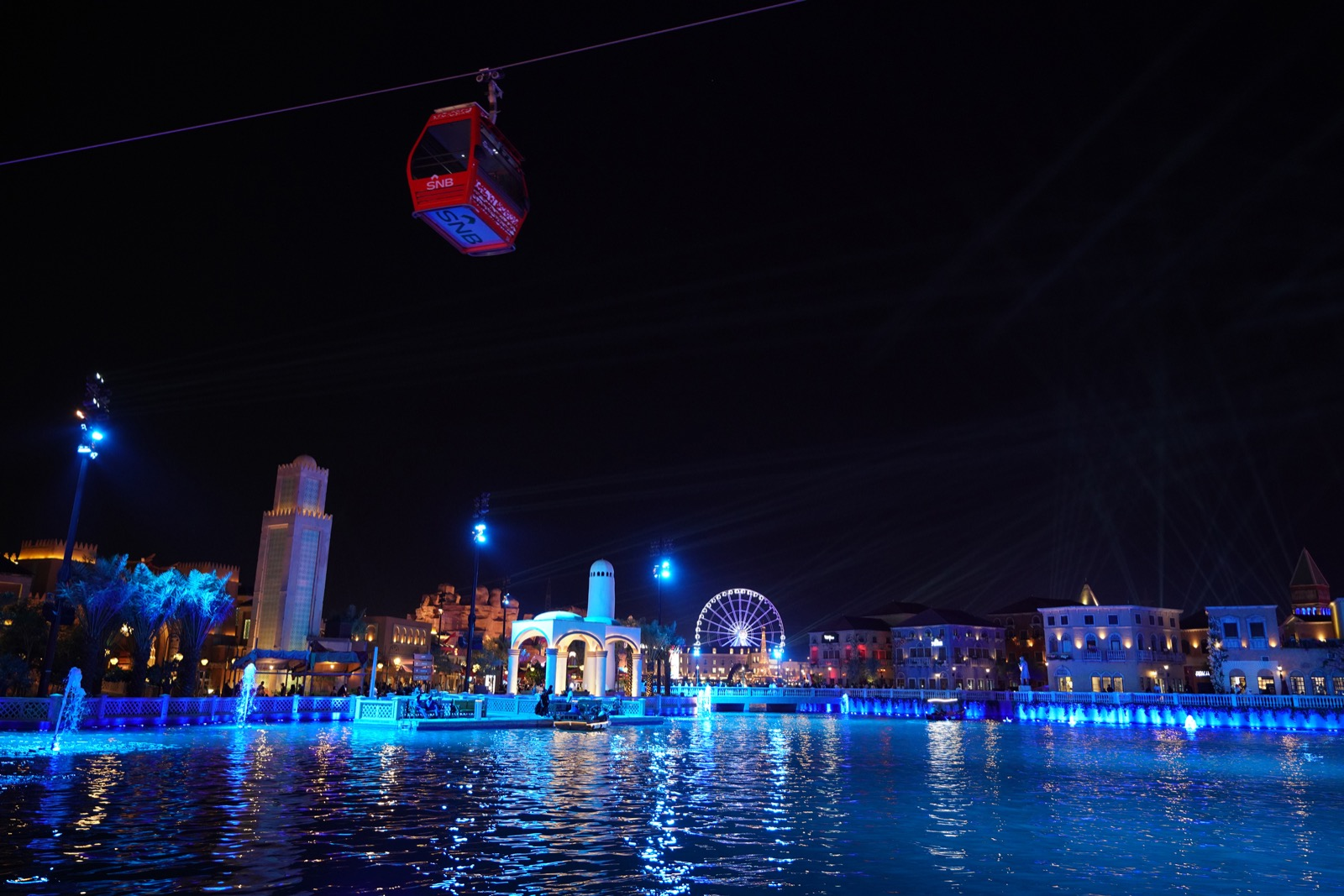
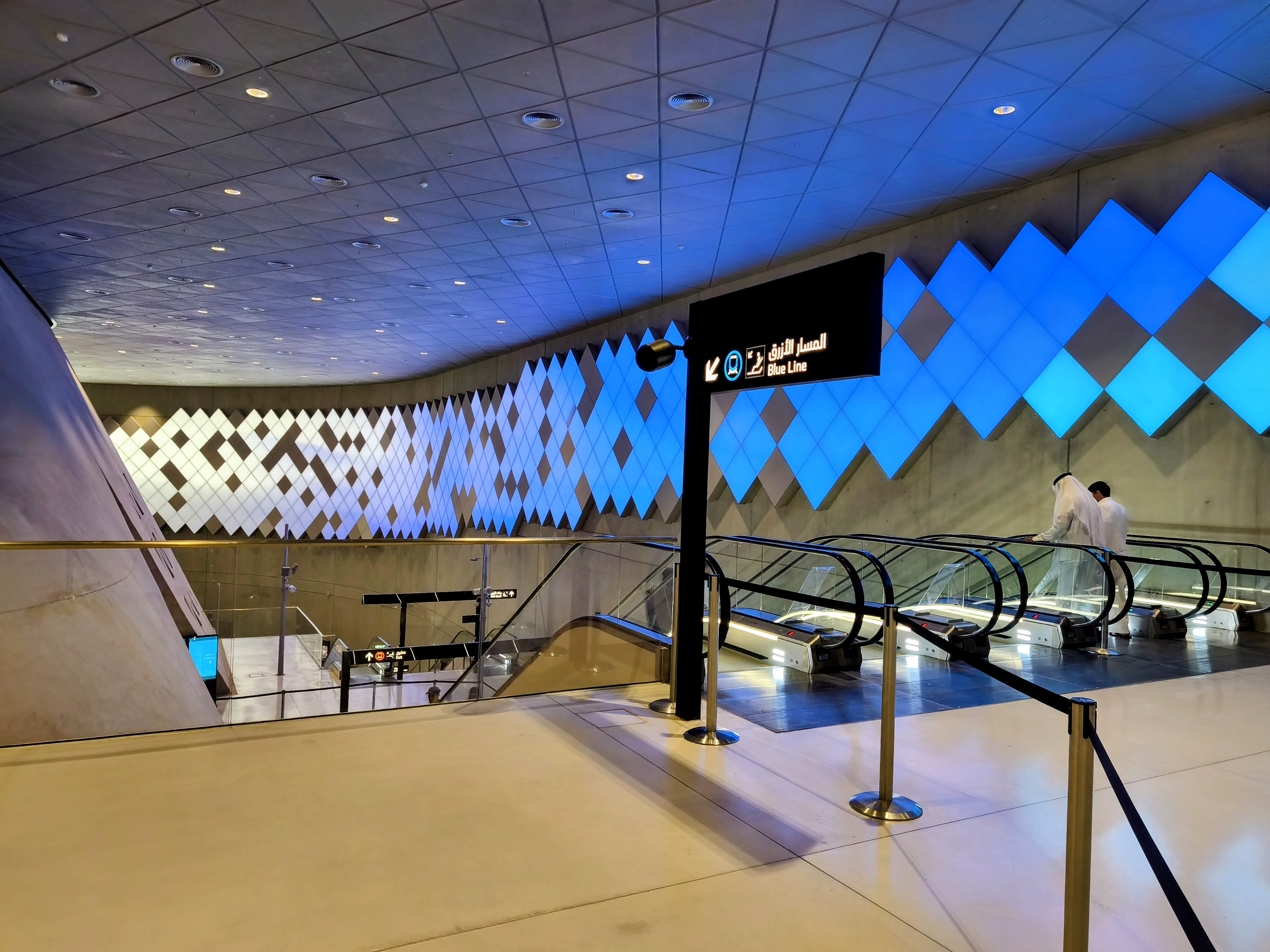
- King Abdullah Financial District Diriyah Boulevard City Qasr Al-Hukm metro station

- Map of Saudi Arabia with Riyadh Province highlighted
- Coordinates: 23°0′N 45°30′E
- Country: Saudi Arabia
- Region: Najd
- Seat: Riyadh
- Governorates: 22

Government
  - Type: Royal Commission / Municipality
  - Body: Riyadh City Royal Commission (Upper body); Riyadh Municipality (Lower body)
  - Governor: Faisal bin Bandar

Area
  - Total: 380,000 km^{2} (150,000 sq mi)

Population (2022)
  - Total: 8,591,748
  - Density: 23/km^{2} (59/sq mi)

GDP
  - Total: US$243.8 billion (2022)
- Time zone: UTC+03:00 (SAST)
- Area code: 011
- ISO 3166 code: SA-01
- Website: www.riyadh.gov.sa

Riyadh Province (Note: Arabic: منطقة الرياض, romanized: Minṭaqat ar-Riyāḍ; also known as the Riyadh Region and officially as the Emirate of Riyadh Province.) is a province in central Saudi Arabia, covering much of the historic Najd region in the heart of the Arabian Peninsula. Its administrative seat is Riyadh, the capital and largest city of Saudi Arabia. With a population of 8,591,748 in 2022, it is the most populous province in the Kingdom and the second-largest by area after the Eastern Province.

== Population ==
Population development since 1992:

Historical population
Year	Pop.	±%
1992	3,834,986	—
2004	5,458,273	+42.3%
2010	6,792,776	+24.4%
2022	8,591,748	+26.5%

== Governorates ==
Riyadh Province is divided into 22 governorates, which are classified into Category A and Category B. The province also includes the new city of Qiddiya, which is located within the province and is being developed as a new urban area.

Map of Riyadh Province

Governorate	Category	Population (2022)
Al-Kharj	A	373,177
Al-Dawadmi	A	200,620
Majmaah	A	151,877
Diriyah	A	95,834
Wadi Al-Dawasir	A	91,535
Al-Zulfi	A	74,903
Afif	A	71,616
Al-Quway'iyah	A	71,410
Al-Muzahmiyya	B	62,760
Al-Dilam	B	54,822
Al-Aflaj	A	54,544
Shaqra	A	46,403
Hotat Bani Tamim	A	41,854
Rimah	B	35,683
Al-Sulayyil	B	35,271
Al-Rayn	B	28,243
Dhurma	B	26,299
Huraymila	B	21,758
Thadig	B	12,510
Al-Ghat	A	10,799
Al-Hariq	B	10,864
Marat	B	9,846

== Transportation ==
=== Airport ===
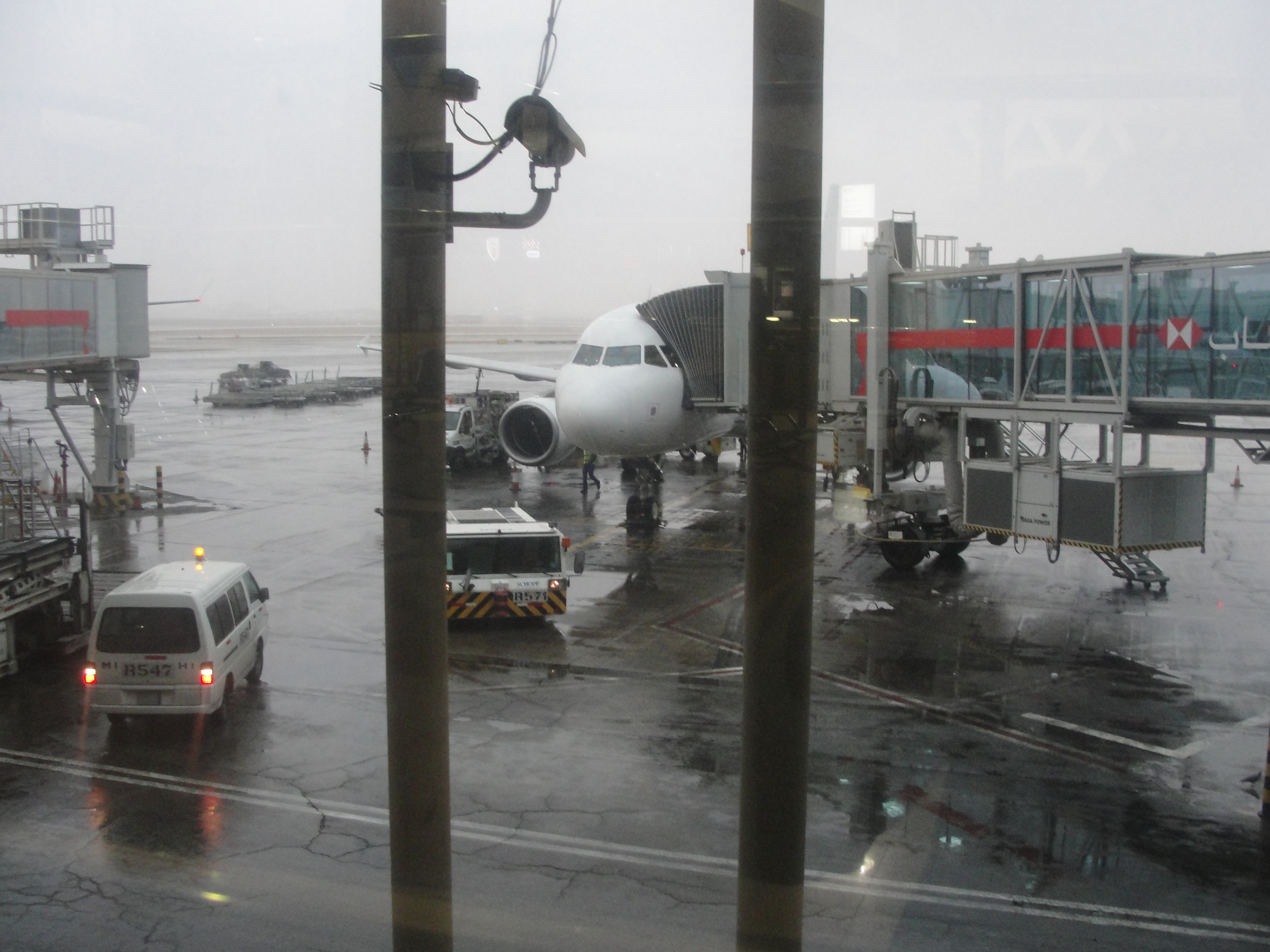
King Khalid International Airport

Riyadh Province is served by King Khalid International Airport, an international and domestic hub located north of the capital city. Plans are underway to develop King Salman International Airport, which will encompass the existing airport facility and serve as the base for Riyadh Air to expand international aviation connections.

=== Inland Port ===
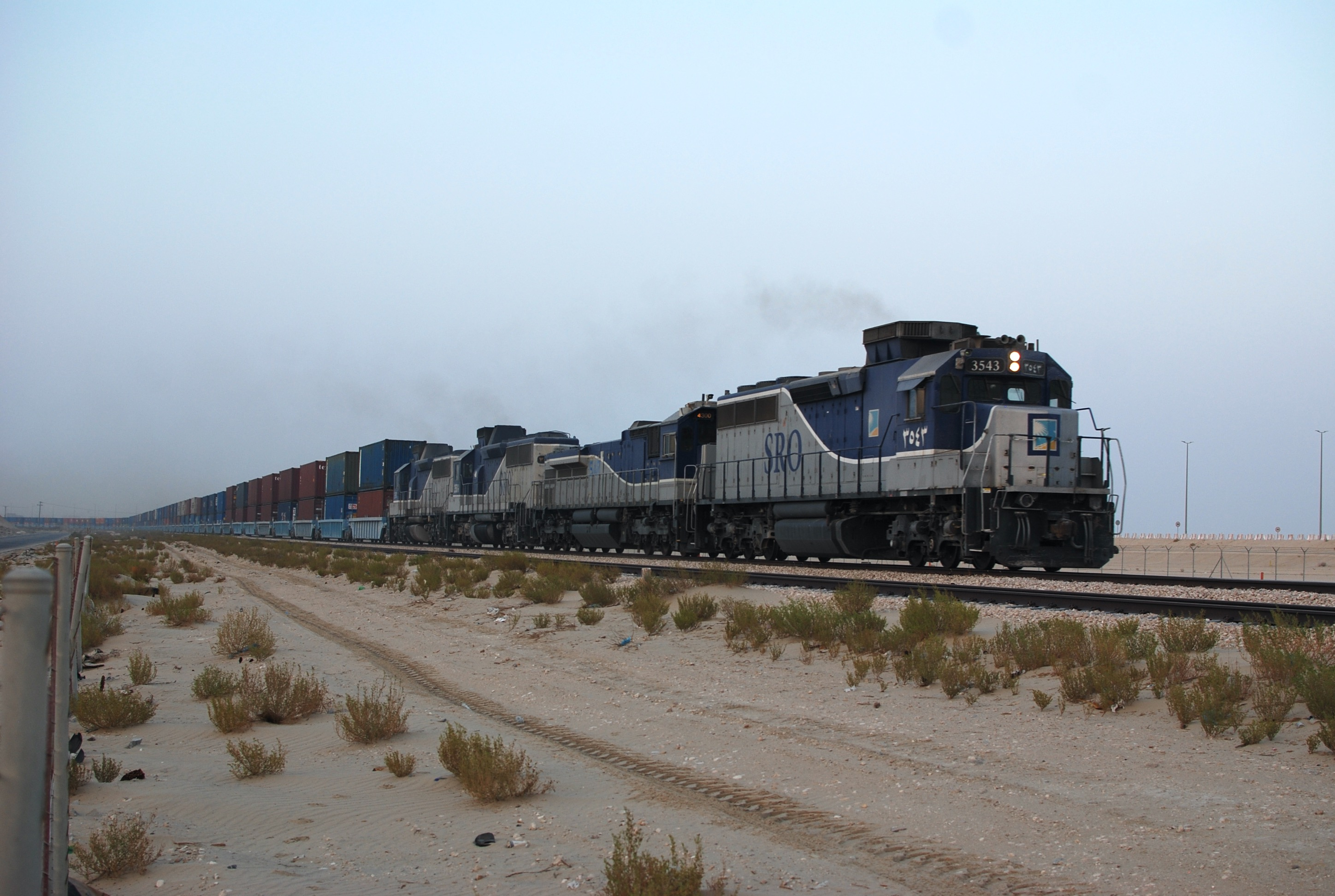
A freight train on the line near Dhahran

As an inland territory, the province uses the Riyadh Dry Port as its central logistics and trade connection point. Linked by the Dammam–Riyadh railway line to the Persian Gulf coast, this facility handles customs, container processing, and distribution for goods entering local industrial markets.

=== Road and rail ===
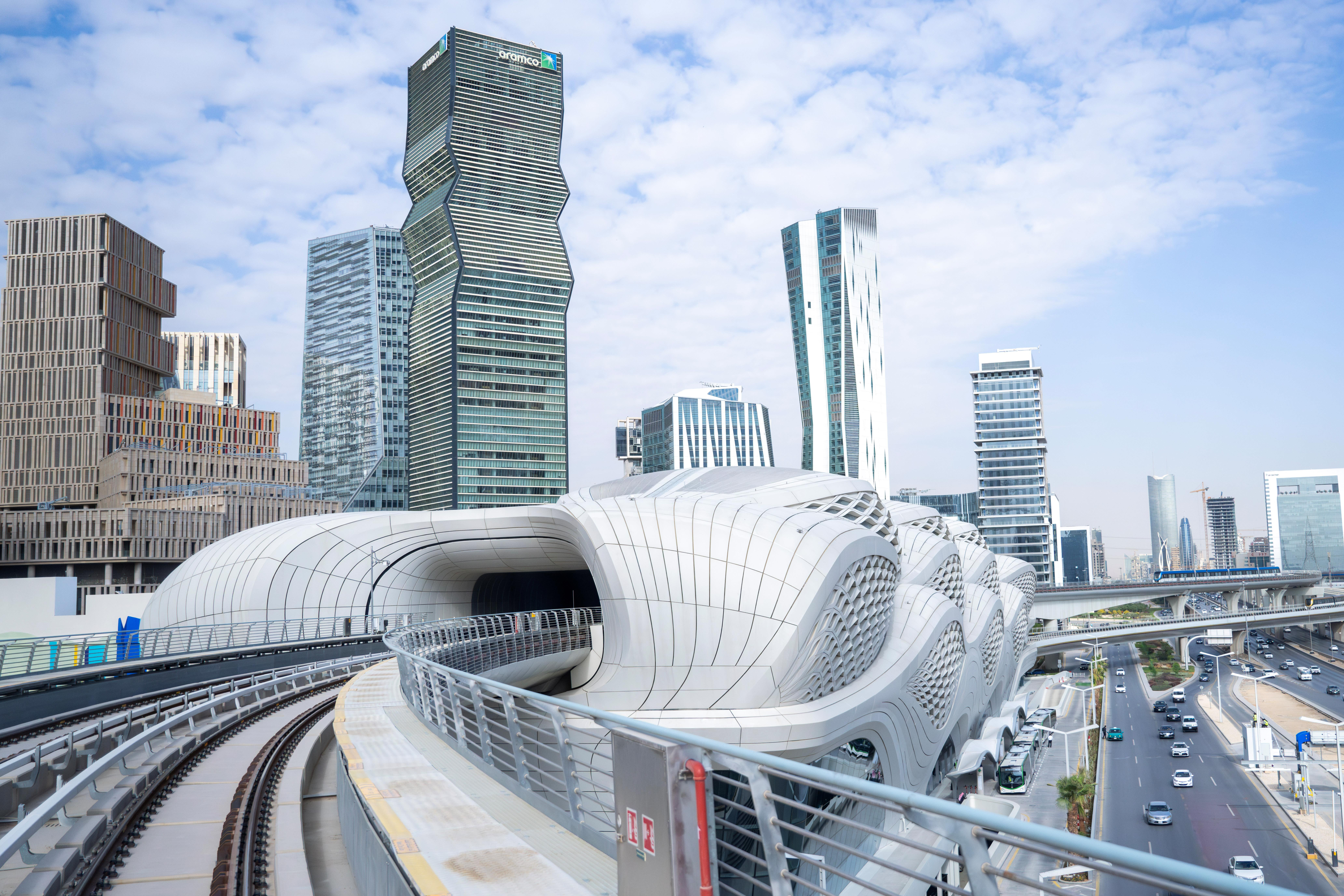
KAFD Station on the Riyadh Metro

The province is a node in the national highway network, centered on Highway 40 which connects Mecca to the west and Dammam to the east. Urban transit includes the Riyadh Metro network, which operates driverless trains across six lines to service Riyadh city. Regionally, the railway network links the province to the Al-Jouf, Hail, and Al-Qassim provinces, while the planned Saudi Landbridge Project is designed to establish a rail link west to Jeddah.

== Provincial government ==
The province is governed by a governor (Emir) appointed by the King of Saudi Arabia, assisted by a deputy governor.

Governor	Term of office	Monarch(s)
Office established
Nasser bin Abdulaziz	1937 – 1947	Abdulaziz
Sultan bin Abdulaziz	29 May 1947 – 19 December 1952	Abdulaziz
Nayef bin Abdulaziz (on behalf of Sultan)	3 March – 19 December 1952	Abdulaziz
Nayef bin Abdulaziz	20 December 1952 – 18 April 1955	Abdulaziz
Salman bin Abdulaziz (on behalf of Nayef)	16 March 1954 – 18 April 1955	Saud
Salman bin Abdulaziz (1st term)	18 April 1955 – 22 September 1960	Saud
Turki II bin Abdulaziz (on behalf of Salman)	10 – 21 October 1957; 31 October 1960	Saud
Fawaz bin Abdulaziz	11 September 1961 – 20 January 1963	Saud
Badr bin Saud	20 January – 5 February 1963	Saud
Salman bin Abdulaziz (2nd term)	5 February 1963 – 5 November 2011	Saud, Faisal, Khalid, Fahd, Abdullah
Sattam bin Abdulaziz	5 November 2011 – 12 February 2013	Abdullah
Khalid bin Bandar	14 February 2013 – 14 May 2014	Abdullah
Turki bin Abdullah	14 May 2014 – 29 January 2015	Abdullah, Salman
Faisal bin Bandar	29 January 2015 – present	Salman

== See also ==
- Provinces of Saudi Arabia
- List of governorates of Saudi Arabia
- List of cities and towns in Saudi Arabia
