= Tuwaiq =

Geographic feature in Saudi Arabia

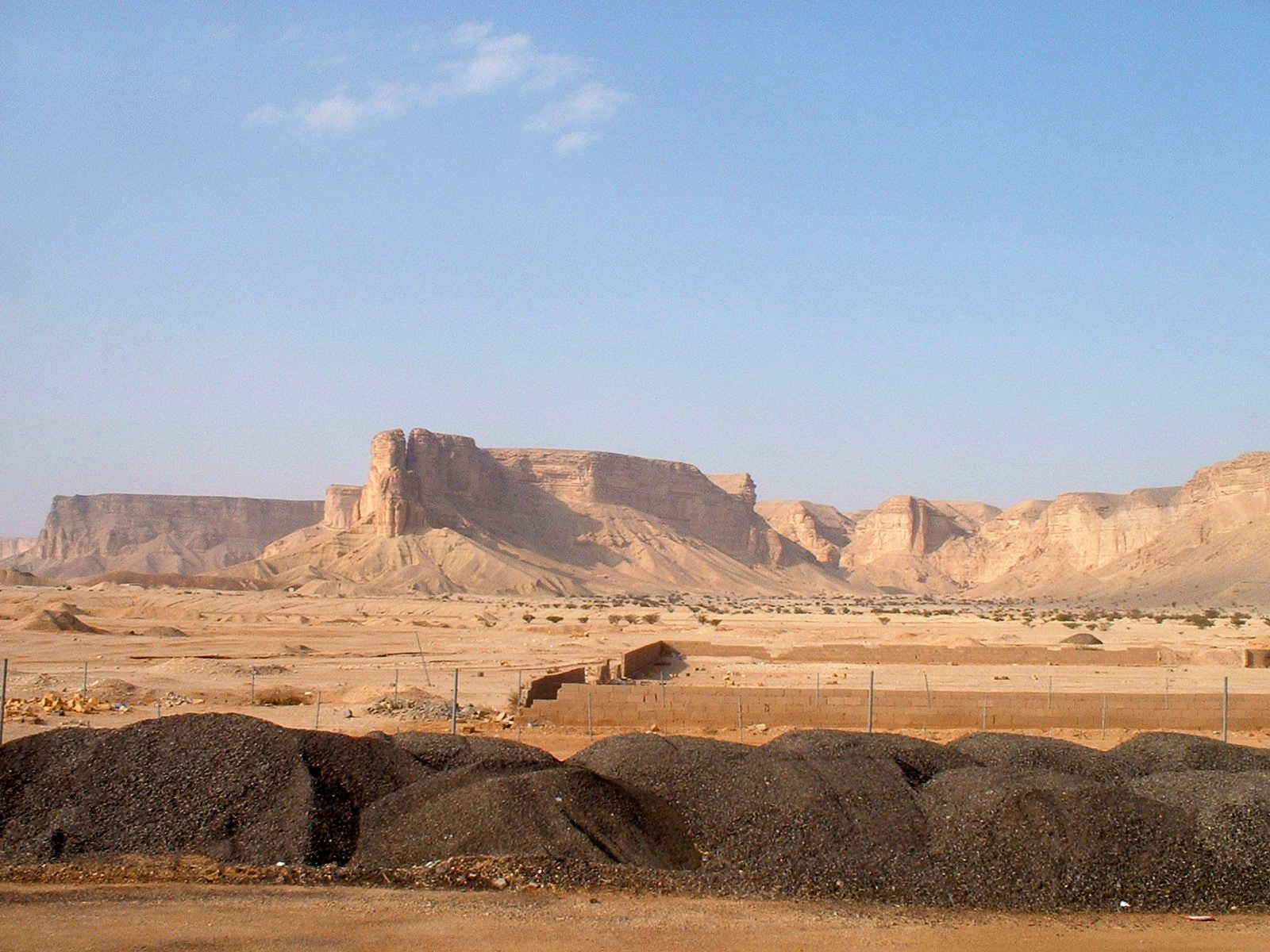
- A view of the Tweig (Tuwaiq) Escarpment from the west. The Saudi capital Riyadh lies just beyond the horizon

Highest point
- Elevation: 600 metres (2,000 ft)
- Coordinates: 19°54′51″N 45°15′6″E

Naming
- Native name: جَبَل طُوَيْق (Arabic)

Geography
- Location within Saudi Arabia Location within West and Central Asia
- Location: Najd, Saudi Arabia
- Province: Riyadh Province

Jabal Tuwaiq (Arabic: جَبَل طُوَيْق, lit. 'Tuwaiq Mountain') or Tuwaiq Escarpment is a narrow escarpment that cuts through the plateau of Najd in central Arabia, running approximately 800 km (500 miles) from the southern border of Al-Qasim in the north to the northern edge of the Rub' al Khali desert near Wadi ad-Dawasir in the south. It is 600 m (2,000 ft) high and also has a Middle Jurassic stratigraphic section. The eastern side slopes downwards gradually whilst the western side ends in an abrupt manner. The escarpment can be thought of as a narrow plateau, though the locals refer to it as a jebel ("mountain"). Marshall Cavendish used the name Tuwayr Mountains to describe mountains of central Arabia, distinct from the Shammar in the north, the Dhofar in the south and the Hajar to the east.

Many narrow valleys (wadis) run along its sides, such as Wadi Hanifa, and a group of towns lies on its central section, including the Saudi capital, Riyadh. Many settlements have historically existed on either side of it as well, such as those of Sudair and Al-Washm. The Tweig escarpment is mentioned in Yaqut's 13th century geographical encyclopedia under the name Al-'Aridh, though for the past few centuries that name has applied only to the central section of it, around Riyadh.

== Jebel Fihrayn ==
Jebel Fihrayn or Edge of the World is a cliff 1,131 m high that lies some 100 km northwest of Riyadh. Formed by tectonic movements of the Arabian plate, the cliffs drop down 300 m into an ancient ocean bed. They are a popular touristic spot offering wide views of a vast desert landscape.

== Petroleum geology ==
The Arab-D (Upper Jurassic) unit of the Riyadh Group makes up one of the largest petroleum reservoirs in the world. Bureau and Saudi Aramco researchers conducted a high-resolution LIDAR survey of Middle Jurassic outcrops of the Tuwaiq Mountain limestone along the Tuwaiq Mountain Escarpment near the city of Riyadh, Saudi Arabia. This study was a first step towards building a quantitative 3-D geologic model for use as an analog to the lower Arab-D reservoir. Outcrop analogs like this one are critical to understanding reservoir performance on the flow-unit scale (1 to 30 m (98 ft)). Although seismic data allow geologists to gain information about large-scale reservoir compartmentalization (>30 metres (98 feet)), flow-unit scale reservoir parameters are far below seismic imaging capability and inter-well spacing.

High-precision laser scans were used as a template upon which stratigraphic interpretation was made, allowing researchers to characterize sub-seismic, flow-unit scale reservoir properties of Jurassic bioherms in an effort to better understand optimum production techniques of this enormous reservoir.

== Gallery ==
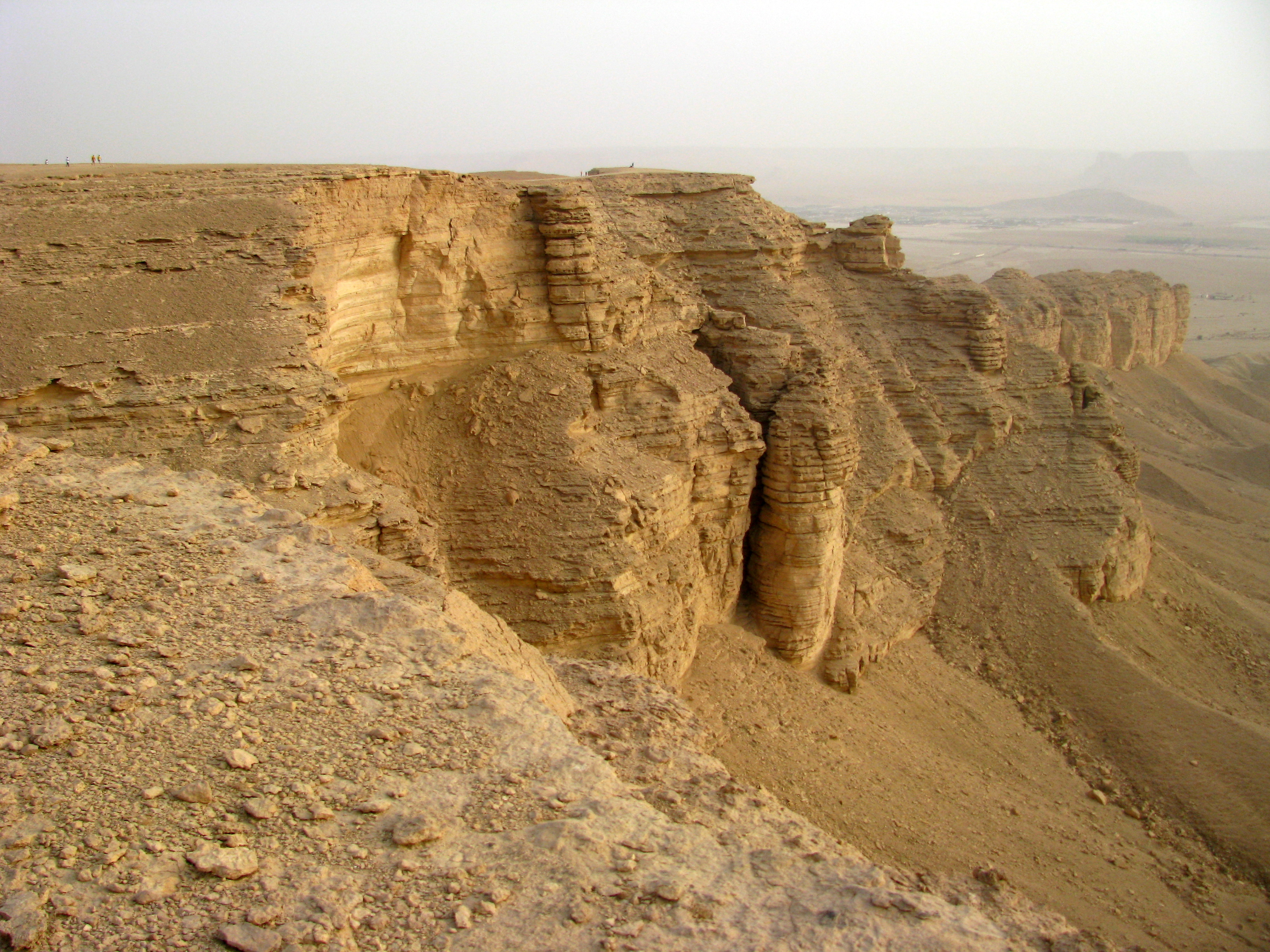
Along the ridge

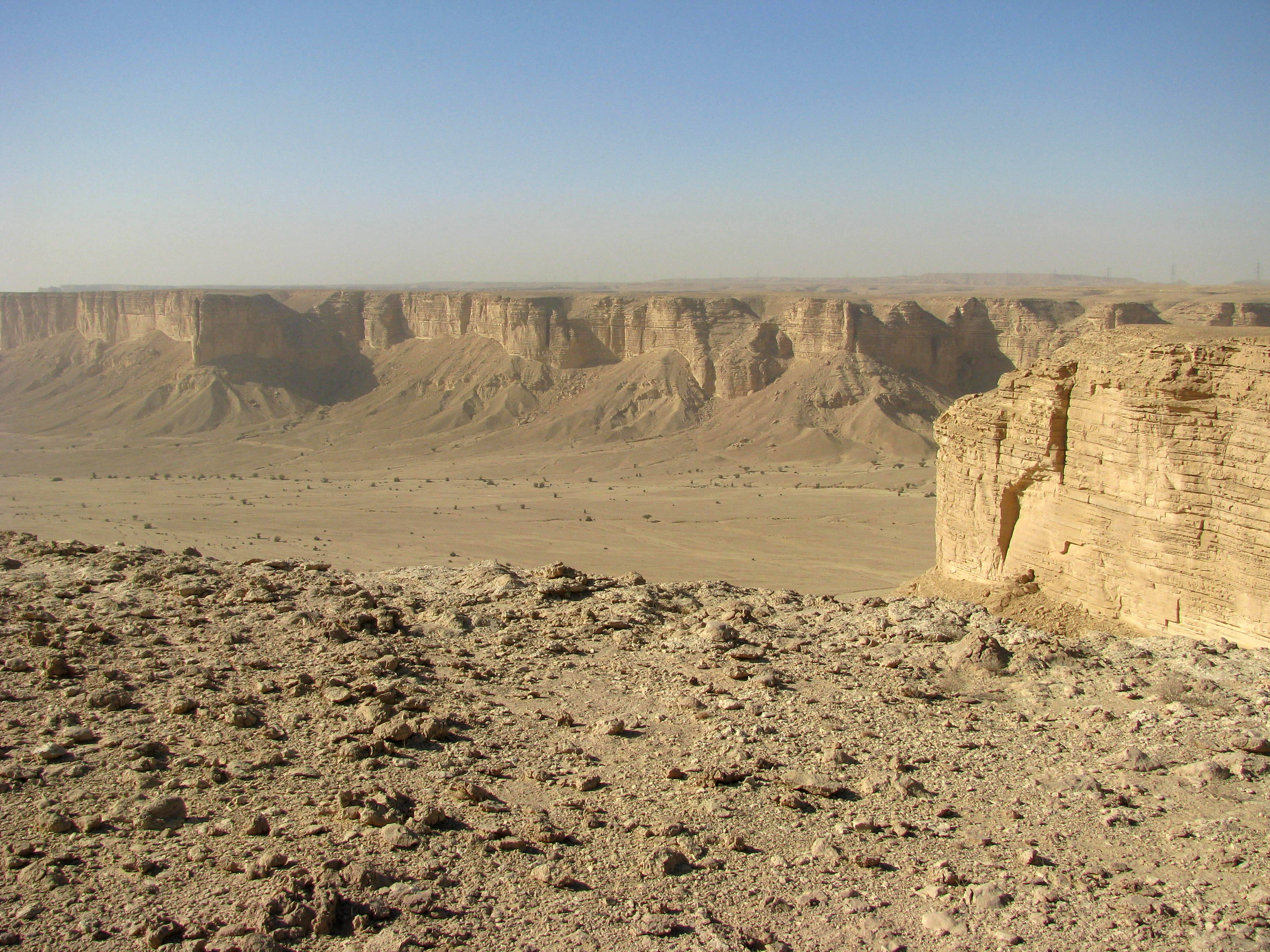
Desert canyon

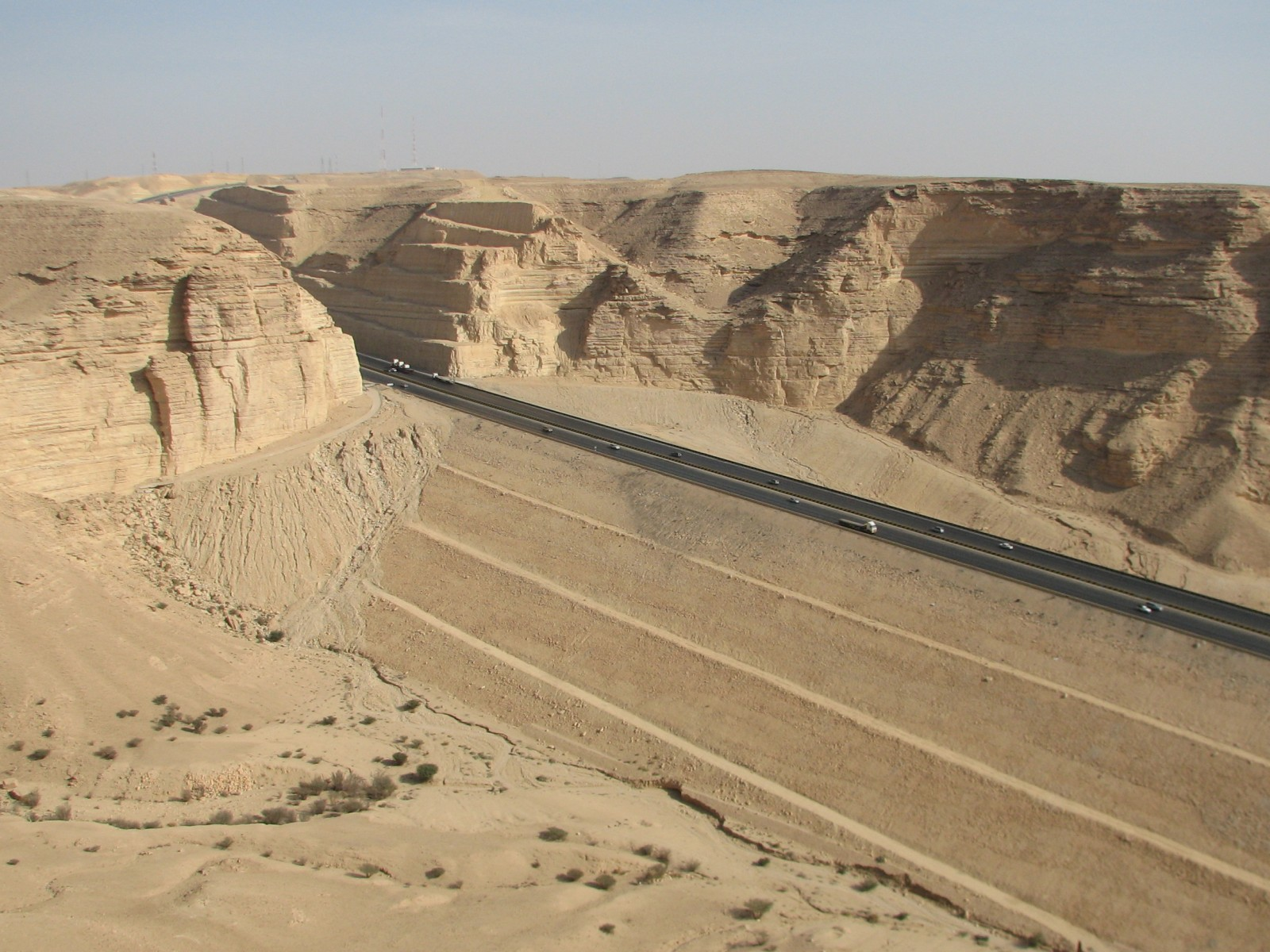
The highway from Riyadh to Mecca

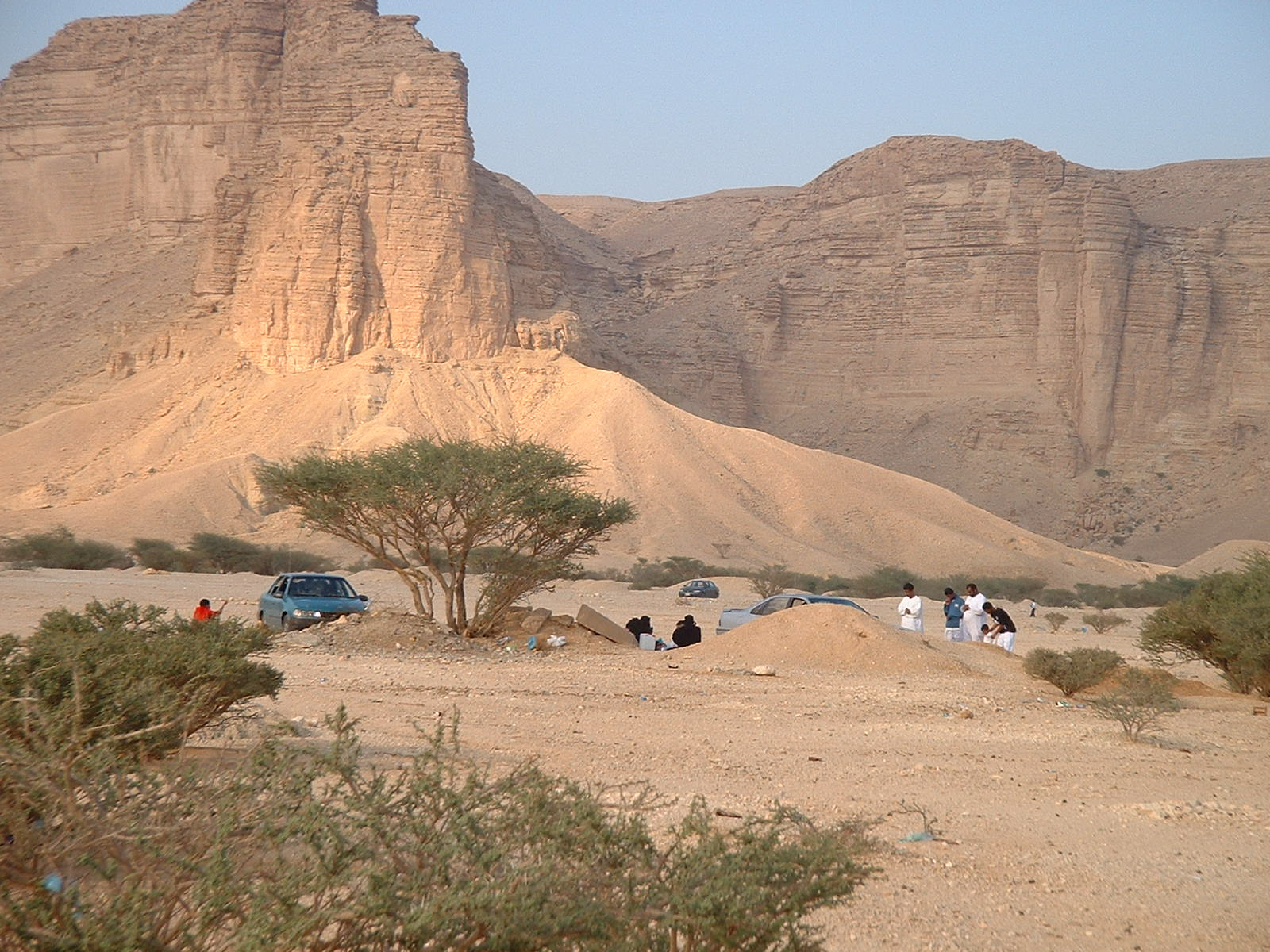
People at the base of the escarpment

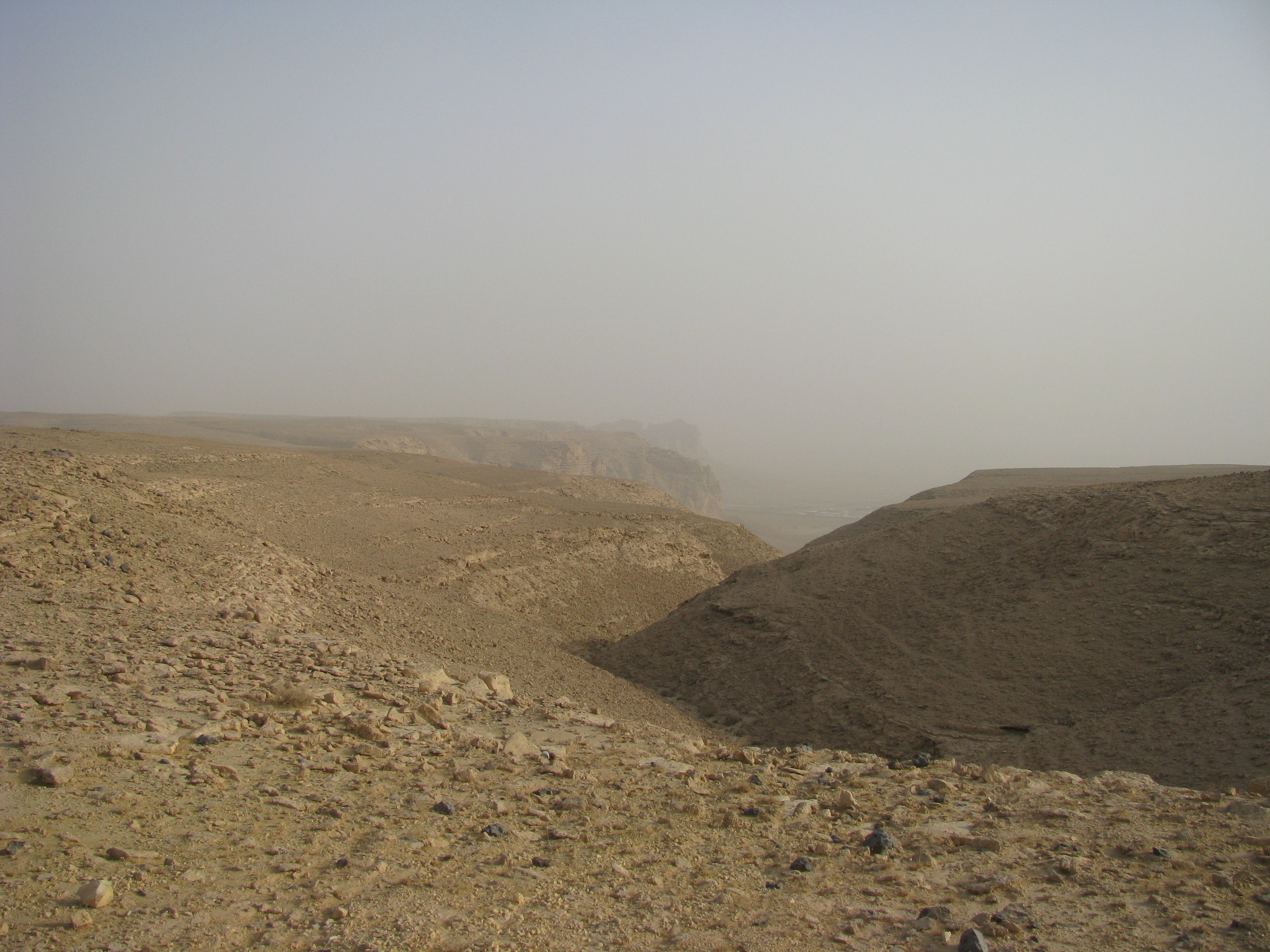
Looking out from the edge of the Tuwaiq Escarpment, west of Riyadh

== See also ==
- Escarpment
- List of escarpments
- List of wadis of Saudi Arabia
- List of mountains in Saudi Arabia
