= ISO 3166-2:SA =

Entry for Saudi Arabia in ISO 3166-2

ISO 3166-2:SA is the entry for Saudi Arabia in ISO 3166-2, part of the ISO 3166 standard published by the International Organization for Standardization (ISO), which defines codes for the names of the principal subdivisions (e.g., provinces or states) of all countries coded in ISO 3166-1.

Currently for Saudi Arabia, ISO 3166-2 codes are defined for 13 regions.

Each code consists of two parts, separated by a hyphen. The first part is SA, the ISO 3166-1 alpha-2 code of Saudi Arabia. The second part is two digits (01–14 except 13).

== Current codes ==
Subdivision names are listed as in the ISO 3166-2 standard published by the ISO 3166 Maintenance Agency (ISO 3166/MA).

Click on the button in the header to sort each column.

Code	Subdivision name (ar) (BGN/PCGN 1956)	Subdivision name (ar) (Note: For reference only, Arabic name in Arabic script not included in the ISO 3166-2 standard.)	Subdivision name (en) (Note: For reference only, English name not included in the ISO 3166-2 standard.)
SA-14	'Asīr	عَسِيْر	Asir
SA-11	Al Bāḩah	ٱلْبَاحَة	Baha
SA-08	Al Ḩudūd ash Shamālīyah	الحدود الشمالية	Northern Borders
SA-12	Al Jawf	الجوف	Jouf
SA-03	Al Madīnah al Munawwarah	ٱلْمَدِيْنَة ٱلْمُنَوَّرَة	Medina
SA-05	Al Qaşīm	القصيم	Qassim
SA-01	Ar Riyāḑ	الرياض	Riyadh
SA-04	Ash Sharqīyah	الشرقية	Eastern
SA-06	Ḩā'il	حَائِل	Ha’il
SA-09	Jāzān	جازان	Jizan
SA-02	Makkah al Mukarramah	مكة	Mecca
SA-10	Najrān	نجران	Najran
SA-07	Tabūk	تَبُوْك	Tabuk

== Changes ==
The following changes to the entry have been announced in newsletters by the ISO 3166/MA since the first publication of ISO 3166-2 in 1998:

Newsletter	Date issued	Description of change in newsletter
Newsletter II-3	2011-12-13 (corrected 2011-12-15)	Alphabetical re-ordering.
Online Browsing; Platform (OBP)	2014-11-03	Change subdivision names of SA-02, SA-03 and SA-09; update List Source
Online Browsing; Platform (OBP)	2018-11-26	Change of subdivision category from province to region

== See also ==
- Subdivisions of Saudi Arabia
- FIPS region codes of Saudi Arabia
- Neighbouring countries: AE, IQ, JO, KW, OM, QA, YE
