= List of cities and towns in Saudi Arabia =

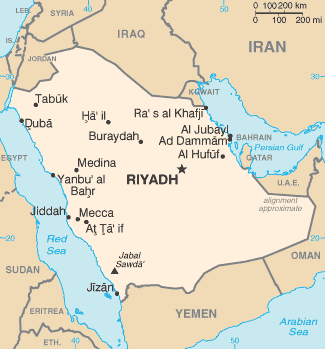
Map of Saudi Arabia

This is a list of cities and towns in the Kingdom of Saudi Arabia.

== List of metropolitan cities ==
Saudi Arabia has five metropolitan areas with populations exceeding one million.

City	Population (2022)	Notes
Riyadh	7,009,100	Capital and largest city of Saudi Arabia
Jeddah	3,751,917	Second-largest city in Saudi Arabia and largest in Mecca Province
Dammam	2,638,166	Capital of the Eastern Province
Mecca	2,385,509	Capital of Mecca Province and holiest city in Islam
Medina	1,477,023	Capital of the Medina Province and second holiest city in Islam

== List of cities ==
Rank	City	Province	Population (2022)
1	Riyadh	Riyadh Province	7,000,100
2	Jeddah	Mecca Province	3,712,917
3	Mecca	Mecca Province	2,385,509
4	Medina	Medina Province	1,411,599
5	Dammam	Eastern Province	1,386,671
6	Hofuf	Eastern Province	729,606
7	Tabuk	Tabuk Province	594,350
8	Buraydah	Al-Qassim Province	574,169
9	Taif	Mecca Province	563,282
10	Khamis Mushait	Asir Province	535,065
11	Jubail	Eastern Province	474,679
12	Hail	Hail Province	448,623
13	Khobar	Eastern Province	409,549
14	Najran	Najran Province	381,431
15	Abha	Asir Province	334,290
16	Yanbu	Medina Province	331,916
17	Al-Saih	Riyadh Province	295,462
18	Al-Mubarraz	Eastern Province	290,800
19	Sabya	Jazan Province	223,083
20	Arar	Northern Borders Province	202,719
21	Unaizah	Al-Qassim Province	184,600
22	Jizan	Jazan Province	173,919
23	Qurayyat	Al-Jouf Province	167,104
24	Dhahran	Eastern Province	143,936
25	Ar Rass	Al-Qassim Province	121,359
26	Rabigh	Mecca Province	112,383
27	Tabarjal	Al-Jouf Province	109,796
28	Wadi Al-Dawasir	Riyadh Province	91,535
29	Al-Baha	Al-Baha Province	90,515
30	Qatif	Eastern Province	87,332
31	Dawadmi	Riyadh Province	86,861
32	Saihat	Eastern Province	84,818
33	Rafha	Northern Borders Province	84,536
34	Khafji	Eastern Province	84,316
35	Majmaah	Riyadh Province	70,243
36	Umluj	Tabuk Province	69,656
37	Al-Zulfi	Riyadh Province	68,317
38	Turaif	Northern Borders Province	66,004
39	Al-Muzahmiyya	Riyadh Province	62,760
40	al-Ula	Medina Province	60,103
41	Duba	Tabuk Province	54,917
42	Ad-Dilam	Riyadh Province	54,822
43	Dumat al-Jandal	Al-Jouf Province	54,341
44	Bareq	Asir Province	44,880
45	Al-Qunfudhah	Mecca Province	42,447

== List of planned cities ==
City	Province
Jazan City for Primary and Downstream Industries	Jazan Province
King Abdullah Economic City	Mecca Province
Al-Faisaliah City	Mecca Province
NEOM	Tabuk Province
Qiddiya City	Riyadh Province

== See also ==
- Provinces of Saudi Arabia
- List of governorates of Saudi Arabia
