= Saudi Arabia Standard Time =

Time zone used in Saudi Arabia

Saudi Arabia Standard Time

Saudi Arabia Standard Time (Arabic: التوقيت القياسي السعودي, romanized: At-Tawqīt al-qiyāsiyy as-suʿūdiyy; SAST) is the standard time zone of Saudi Arabia. The time zone is 3 hours ahead of UTC (UTC+03:00) with no daylight savings. SAST is defined by the 45th Meridian East. Before a standardized time zone was introduced, the country used Arabic time, in which clocks were set to midnight at sundown. Because of confusion between various other systems also used in the kingdom, the standardized use of a time zone was established.

== History ==
Until 1968, Saudi Arabia used Arabic time, where clocks were set to 12 o'clock at sunset or when the call to prayer for the sunset prayer was heard. This was because the Islamic calendar defines sunset as marking the beginning of a new day. However this later conflicted with the introduction of western sun time, which defined, in congruence with Europe, the start of a new day to be midnight. With western sun time, clocks were set to six o'clock at sun set. While western sun time was intended to be approximately equal to GMT+3, it being reliant on sunset time, which changed with the seasons, meant that large disparity could emerge between western sunset time and GMT+3 as seasons progressed.

In addition to this, the American Military Assistance Advisory Group introduced "Zulu time". Saudia used GMT+3 for most of the country, except for Dhahran which was set at GMT+4. The American Arabian Oil Company, used to also observe daylight savings for its headquarters in Dhahran. Similarly, the Trans-Arabian Pipeline Company also observed daylight savings for its pumps in the east of the country.

== tz database ==
The tz database contains one zone for Saudi Arabia in the file zone.tab, which is named Asia/Riyadh.

c.c.	Coordinates	Timezone name	Comments	UTC offset (Std.)	UTC offset (DST)
SA	+2438+04643	Asia/Riyadh	Syowa	+03:00	—N/a

== See also ==
- Moscow Time
- Arabia Standard Time
