= Provinces of Saudi Arabia =

First-level administrative divisions of Saudi Arabia

Provinces of the Kingdom of Saudi Arabia مناطق المملكة العربية السعودية (Arabic)
- Category: Provinces within a unitary state
- Location: Saudi Arabia
- Number: 13
- Populations: 339,174 (Al-Baha Province) – 8,591,748 (Riyadh Province)
- Areas: 9,920 km^{2} (3,831 sq mi) (Al-Baha Province) – 672,520 km^{2} (259,662 sq mi) (Eastern Province)
- Government: Provincial government, national government
- Subdivisions: Governorates

The provinces of Saudi Arabia, also referred to as regions, are the 13 first-level administrative divisions of the Kingdom of Saudi Arabia. Each province is governed by a governor (emir).

== History ==
Prior to the unification of Saudi Arabia in 1932, the Arabian Peninsula was composed of several distinct regions, many of which had been part of or influenced by the Ottoman Empire (1299–1922), including the Hejaz Vilayet and the Lahsa Eyalet. Earlier in the region’s history, the First Saudi State (1727–1818) and the Second Saudi State (1824–1891) had established Saudi rule over much of Najd and its surroundings, laying the groundwork for later unification efforts. After unification, these historical regions — such as Najd and Asir — along with former Ottoman territories like Hejaz, formed the basis for the kingdom’s evolving administrative divisions, which were later reorganized into modern provinces.

King Fahd issued Royal Order A/92 on March 2, 1992, known as Law of the Provinces, which provided for the division of the kingdom into 13 provinces. Subsequently, the five previous provinces were divided into thirteen provinces, called provinces (manātiq), each governed by administrative bodies called the emirates of the provinces (imārāt al-manātiq). The provinces form the first-level administrative division of the Organization of the Kingdom of Saudi Arabia and are further divided into 136 governorates (muḥāfaẓāt), which are the second-level division, which are further subdivided into 1,347 municipal-level units (marakiz), and further subdivided into villages (qura) and neighborhoods (ahya).

== Government ==
Each province is governed by an Emir (provincial governor), who is assisted by the deputy emir, called nā'ib. The persons holding these positions are appointed by the King of Saudi Arabia. The emir is given the rank of minister, while the deputy emir is given the rank of excellence.

== List ==
Provinces of the Kingdom of Saudi Arabia
#	Province	Historical region	Seat / Largest city	Governorates	Marakiz	Population (2022 census)	Area (km^{2})	Density (per km^{2})
1	Asir Province	South Arabia	Abha / Khamis Mushait	17	101	2,024,285	76,693	26.40
2	Al-Baha Province	Hejaz	Al-Baha	9	35	339,174	9,921	34.20
3	Al-Jouf Province	Badiyat al-Sham	Sakaka	3	33	595,822	85,212	6.99
4	Al-Qassim Province	Najd	Buraydah	12	153	1,336,179	58,046	23.01
5	Eastern Province	Eastern Arabia	Dammam	12	107	5,125,254	672,522	7.62
6	Hail Province	Najd	Hail	8	84	746,406	103,887	7.19
7	Jazan Province	South Arabia	Jizan	16	31	1,404,997	11,671	120.43
8	Mecca Province	Hejaz	Mecca / Jeddah	17	111	7,769,994	153,128	50.76
9	Medina Province	Hejaz	Medina	8	90	2,389,452	151,990	15.72
10	Najran Province	South Arabia	Najran	6	59	592,300	149,511	3.96
11	Northern Borders Province	Badiyat al-Sham	Arar	3	17	373,577	111,797	3.34
12	Riyadh Province	Najd	Riyadh	22	453	8,591,748	404,240	21.25
13	Tabuk Province	Hejaz	Tabuk	6	73	886,036	146,072	6.07
Total			13	139	1,347	32,175,224	2,149,690	14.97

== Codes ==
ISO 3166-2:SA – Codes for the Provinces of Saudi Arabia
Code	Province (EN)	Province (AR)
SA–14	Asir Province	منطقة عسير
SA–11	Al-Baha Province	منطقة الباحة
SA–08	Northern Borders Province	منطقة الحدود الشمالية
SA–12	Al-Jouf Province	منطقة الجوف
SA–03	Medina Province	منطقة المدينة المنورة
SA–05	Al-Qassim Province	منطقة القصيم
SA–01	Riyadh Province	منطقة الرياض
SA–04	Eastern Province	المنطقة الشرقية
SA–06	Hail Province	منطقة حائل
SA–09	Jazan Province	منطقة جازان
SA–02	Mecca Province	منطقة مكة المكرمة
SA–10	Najran Province	منطقة نجران
SA–07	Tabuk Province	منطقة تبوك

== See also ==
- Subdivisions of Saudi Arabia
- List of governorates of Saudi Arabia
- List of cities and towns in Saudi Arabia
