= 2025–26 Saudi Second Division League =

49th season of the Saudi Second Division

Second Division League
- Season: 2025–26
- Dates: 3 October 2025 – 23 April 2026
- Champions: Al-Saqer (1st title)
- Promoted: Al-Saqer; Al-Jeel; Hajer
- Relegated: Tuwaiq; Al-Sadd; Bisha; Ohod
- Matches: 483
- Goals: 1,306 (2.7 per match)
- Top goalscorer: Papel (24 goals)
- Biggest home win: Al-Lewaa 5–0 Al-Safa (22 November 2025); Wej 5–0 Ohod (6 December 2025); Al-Nairyah 6–1 Al-Safa (12 February 2026)
- Biggest away win: Tuwaiq 0–6 Jerash (4 October 2025); Ohod 0–6 Al-Qous (17 November 2025)
- Highest scoring: Al-Shoulla 6–4 Jerash (6 February 2026); Al-Ghottah 6–4 Arar (27 March 2026)
- Longest winning run: Al-Jeel (7 matches)
- Longest unbeaten run: Al-Nojoom (21 matches)
- Longest winless run: Ohod (25 matches)
- Longest losing run: Ohod (21 matches)
- All statistics correct as of 23 April 2026.

The 2025–26 Saudi Second Division League was the fifth season of the Saudi Second Division League after its rebrand, and the 50th season since its establishment in 1976. The season began on 3 October 2025 and concluded with the final on 23 April 2026. The group stage draw was held on 27 May 2025.

The final was played on 23 April 2026 between Al-Jeel and Al-Saqer. Al-Saqer defeated Al-Jeel 5–4 on penalties (1–1 after extra time) to win their first title.

== Team changes ==
A total of 32 teams are contesting the league, including 25 sides from the 2024–25 season, 3 relegated teams from the FD League, and 4 promoted teams from the Third Division.

=== To Second Division ===
Promoted from the Third Division

- Al-Qala
- Jubbah
- Afif
- Al-Nairyah

Relegated from FD League

- Al-Ain
- Al-Safa
- Ohod

=== From Second Division ===
Promoted to FD League

- Al-Diriyah
- Al-Ula
- Al-Anwar

Relegated to the Third Division

- Al-Taqadom
- Al-Houra
- Al-Ansar
- Al-Qaisumah

== Teams ==
Group A

Locations of teams in the 2025–26 Saudi Second Division Group A

| Club | Location | Stadium |
|---|---|---|
| Afif | Afif | Al-Dera'a Club Stadium (Dawadmi) |
| Al-Ain | Al Atawlah | King Saud Sport City Stadium (Al Bahah) |
| Al-Entesar | Rabigh | Al-Entesar Club Stadium |
| Al-Jeel | Al-Hasa (Hofuf) | Prince Abdullah bin Jalawi Stadium |
| Al-Nojoom | Al-Hasa (Al-Shuqaiq) | Prince Abdullah bin Jalawi Stadium |
| Al-Rawdhah | Al-Hasa (Al-Jeshah) | Al-Rawdhah Club Stadium |
| Al-Sadd | Ad-Dilam (Najaan) | Al-Anwar Club Stadium (Hotat Bani Tamim) |
| Al-Sahel | Qatif | Prince Nayef bin Abdulaziz Stadium |
| Al-Sharq | Ad-Dilam | Al-Shoulla Club Stadium (Al-Kharj) |
| Al-Shoulla | Al-Kharj | Al-Shoulla Club Stadium |
| Al-Taraji | Qatif | Prince Nayef bin Abdulaziz Stadium |
| Al-Washm | Shaqra | Al-Washm Club Stadium |
| Jerash | Ahad Rafidah | Prince Sultan bin Abdul Aziz Reserve Stadium (Abha) |
| Jubbah | Jubbah | Al-Jabalain Club Stadium (Ha'il) |
| Najran | Najran | Prince Hathloul bin Abdul Aziz Sport City Stadium |
| Tuwaiq | Al Zulfi | Al-Zulfi Club Stadium |

Group B

Locations of teams in the 2025–26 Saudi Second Division Group B

| Club | Location | Stadium |
|---|---|---|
| Al-Ghottah | Mawqaq | Al-Jabalain Club Stadium (Ha'il) |
| Al-Kawkab | Al-Kharj | Al-Shoulla Club Stadium |
| Al-Lewaa | Baqaa | Al-Lewaa Club Stadium |
| Al-Nairyah | Al Nairyah | Al-Nairyah Club Stadium |
| Al-Qala | Sakakah | Al-Qala Club Stadium |
| Al-Qous | Al Khurmah | Al-Qous Club Stadium |
| Al-Rayyan | Haʼil | Al-Jabalain Club Stadium |
| Al-Safa | Safwa | Al-Safa Club Stadium |
| Al-Saqer | Buraidah (Al-Basr) | Al-Taawoun Club Stadium |
| Arar | Arar | Prince Abdullah bin Abdulaziz bin Musa'ed Sport City Stadium |
| Bisha | Bisha | Bisha University Stadium |
| Hajer | Al-Hasa (Hofuf) | Hajer Club Stadium |
| Hetten | Samtah | King Faisal Sport City Stadium (Jizan) |
| Mudhar | Qatif | Prince Nayef bin Abdulaziz Stadium |
| Ohod | Medina | Ohod Club Stadium |
| Wej | Ta'if | King Fahd Sports City |

== Foreign players ==
The number of foreign players each club is allowed to register is 4 players.

Players name in bold indicates the player is registered during the mid-season transfer window.

Players name in italics indicates the player is out of squad or has left the club during the mid-season transfer window.

| Club | Player 1 | Player 2 | Player 3 | Player 4 | U21 player(s) | Former players |
|---|---|---|---|---|---|---|
| Afif | (Brazil) André Mensalão | (Brazil) Gustavo Schutz | (Greece) **Alexandros Zafirakis** | (Nigeria) Julius Ufuoma | | (Brazil) Dedê |
| Al-Ain | (Brazil) Matheus | (Chad) **Othman Maloum** | (Madagascar) **Carolus Andria** | (Morocco) **Fayssal Abbouchi** | | (Algeria) Mounir Ait L'Hadi (Bolivia) José María Carrasco (Ghana) Marcelin Gando |
| Al-Entesar | (Algeria) **Mounir Ait L'Hadi** | (Nigeria) **Olaoluwa Ojetunde** | (Tunisia) Jilani Abdessalam | (Tunisia) **Ahmed Beji** | | (Brazil) Téssio (France) Sofiane Dia (Tanzania) Edwin Balua (Tunisia) Khalil Balbouz |
| Al-Ghottah | (Benin) Salim Fadil Bawa | (Ghana) **Mubarak Alhassan** | (Ghana) Emmanuel Mensah | (Tunisia) Omar Lamti | | (Nigeria) Tony Edjomariegwe |
| Al-Jeel | (Republic of the Congo) Anaël Bakaki | (Ghana) **Maxwell Abbey Quaye** | (Morocco) Hicham Nouali | (Tunisia) Haythem Ayouni | | (France) **Sofiane Dia** (Ghana) Frederick Acheampong |
| Al-Kawkab | (Algeria) Khaled Nèche | (The Gambia) Abdoulie Kassama | (Guinea) Mohamed Camara | (Tunisia) Hamza Mabrouk | | |
| Al-Lewaa | (Brazil) André Penalva | (Brazil) Júninho | (Brazil) Papel | (Brazil) Rayllan Bruno | | |
| Al-Nairyah | (Ivory Coast) Koné Mory | (Mauritania) Cheikh Saadné | (Tunisia) Bassem Dali | (Tunisia) Maher Boulabiar | | |
| Al-Nojoom | (Republic of the Congo) Prince Ibara | (Nigeria) Ukeme Williams | (Tunisia) Montasser Toumi | | | (Brazil) Coutinho |
| Al-Qala | (Brazil) Edilson Júnior | (Brazil) **Téssio** | (Cameroon) **Lucas Kevin N'dy** | (Togo) Emmanuel Kpatai | (Ghana) Owusu Barnse (Senegal) Abdou Karim Dieme | (Ghana) Maxwell Abbey Quaye (Tunisia) Sabri Zaidi |
| Al-Qous | (The Gambia) Babou Cham | (Morocco) Achraf Mirat | (Senegal) Boubacar Ndiaye | (Tunisia) Houssem Lahbibi | (Algeria) Walid Ait Mouhoub (Niger) Abdulrasheed Idris | |
| Al-Rawdhah | (Mauritania) Babacar Diop | (Senegal) **Rassoul Ba** | (Tunisia) **Mohamed Ali Hosni** | (Tunisia) **Alaeddine Marzouki** | (Morocco) Omar Kouar | (Morocco) Youssef El Barraqui (Nigeria) Israel Abia (Nigeria) Godwin Odibo |
| Al-Rayyan | (Cameroon) Boris Bissemou | (Cameroon) Duval Wapiwo | (Tunisia) Youssef Trabelsi | (Tunisia) **Sabri Zaidi** | (Egypt) Khalid Shehata | (Tunisia) Mootez Abou Kacem |
| Al-Sadd | (Brazil) Fernandinho | (Ivory Coast) Habib Fofana | (Morocco) **Aymen Sebiba** | (Nigeria) **Emmanuel Joseph** | | (Ghana) Olokwei Commodore (Madagascar) Carolus Andria |
| Al-Safa | (Benin) Marcellin Koukpo | (Tunisia) Sabri Ameri | (Tunisia) Skander Ben Afia | (Uganda) Musa Esenu | | |
| Al-Sahel | (Democratic Republic of the Congo) Éric Kabwe | (Morocco) **Zouhair Ouchen** | (Tunisia) Mohamed Aouichi | (Tunisia) Aymen Trabelsi | | (Iceland) Árni Vilhjálmsson |
| Al-Saqer | (Egypt) Ahmed Azema | (Nigeria) **Tony Edjomariegwe** | (Nigeria) Chima Francis | (Nigeria) Dennis Sesugh | | (Democratic Republic of the Congo) Aristote Zeke Omwele |
| Al-Sharq | (Ghana) Joe Aidoo | (Ivory Coast) **Gnamien Yikpe** | (Mauritania) **Baba Ba** | (Morocco) Karim El Oualadi | | (Brazil) Lucas Gabriel (Morocco) Abdulwahid Bakhash |
| Al-Shoulla | (Ivory Coast) Sinali Bere | (South Sudan) Rashid Toha | (Togo) Hunlede Kissimbo | (Tunisia) Nidhal Ben Salem | | |
| Al-Taraji | (Burkina Faso) Clavert Kiendrebeogo | (Iceland) **Árni Vilhjálmsson** | (Tunisia) Elyes Brini | (Tunisia) Zied Machmoum | | (Burkina Faso) Lamine Ouattara |
| Al-Washm | (Burkina Faso) Abdoul Draman Ouedraogo | (Cameroon) Aurélien Etamé Ngomé | (Democratic Republic of the Congo) Glody Kilangalanga | (Ghana) **Sadat Karim** | | (Chad) Sindou Yéo |
| Arar | (Brazil) Vinícius Boff | (Democratic Republic of the Congo) Heritier Imana | (Mali) Ousmane Doumbia | | | (Morocco) Mohammed Fikri |
| Bisha | (Ivory Coast) Oscar Tahi | (Morocco) Saifeddine Kahlaoui | (Tunisia) **Khalil Balbouz** | (Tunisia) Abdallah Berrabeh | | (Nigeria) Etor Daniel |
| Hajer | (Cameroon) Alain Akono | (Republic of the Congo) **Bercy Langa Lesse** | (Senegal) Bakary Coulibaly | (Tunisia) Wadhah Zaidi | | (The Gambia) Saikou Conteh |
| Hetten | (Brazil) Ramon | (Brazil) **Alyson Romeu** | (Mali) **Amara Bagayoko** | (Rwanda) Ally Niyonzima | | (Ghana) Bortey Acquaye (Ghana) Mubarak Alhassan (Namibia) Willy Stephanus |
| Jerash | (Angola) **Alberto Lubango** | (Brazil) **Wilson Potiguar** | (Ivory Coast) **Ismael Kouakou** | (Togo) Honoré Kpegba | | (Egypt) Mido (Morocco) Fayssal Abbouchi (Switzerland) Raël Lolala |
| Jubbah | (Brazil) **Vlademir Everton** | (Chad) Maher Sharoumah | (Gibraltar) Ayoub El Hmidi | (Morocco) **Achraf Laadoul** | | (Tunisia) Maher Labidi (Tunisia) Fahmi Maaouani |
| Mudhar | (Ivory Coast) Guillaume Daho | (Ivory Coast) Louis Abrogoua | (Ivory Coast) Sylla Daouda | (Tunisia) Houssem Chebli | | |
| Najran | (Brazil) **Diego Silva** | (Ghana) **Frederick Acheampong** | (Nigeria) Umar Bala | (Tunisia) Bassem Ben Aissa | | (Iraq) Sajjad Alaa (Iraq) Abdul-Qadir Tariq |
| Ohod | (Nigeria) **Habib Hawsawi** | (Nigeria) **Mansour Mubarak** | | | | |
| Tuwaiq | (Guinea-Bissau) Piqueti | (Nigeria) Chidiebere Nwakali | (Togo) Franck Mawuena | (Tunisia) **Sameh Bouhajeb** | | (Morocco) Jalal Hajji |
| Wej | (Algeria) **Amine Ghodbane** | (The Gambia) **Saikou Conteh** | (Nigeria) Jamil Muhammad | (Yemen) **Nader Yahya** | (Nigeria) Anas Hassan | (Brazil) Jamerson Neves (Brazil) Vicente (Nigeria) Umar Abba |

== Group A ==
=== League table ===
| Pos | Team | Pld | W | D | L | GF | GA | GD | Pts | Promotion, qualification or relegation |
|---|---|---|---|---|---|---|---|---|---|---|
| 1 | Al-Jeel (P) | 30 | 18 | 4 | 8 | 48 | 35 | +13 | 58 | Promotion to the First Division and qualification to the final |
| 2 | Al-Ain | 30 | 15 | 10 | 5 | 50 | 34 | +16 | 55 | Qualification for the promotion play-offs |
| 3 | Al-Sahel | 30 | 15 | 8 | 7 | 48 | 29 | +19 | 53 | |
| 4 | Al-Washm | 30 | 13 | 9 | 8 | 50 | 34 | +16 | 48 | |
| 5 | Najran | 30 | 13 | 7 | 10 | 44 | 38 | +6 | 46 (Note: Najran finished ahead of Jerash on head-to-head points: Najran: 4 pts, Jerash: 1 pts (Najran 0–0 Jerash, Jerash 0–1 Najran).) | |
| 6 | Jerash | 30 | 13 | 7 | 10 | 52 | 46 | +6 | 46 | |
| 7 | Al-Entesar | 30 | 10 | 12 | 8 | 38 | 36 | +2 | 42 | |
| 8 | Al-Nojoom | 30 | 6 | 21 | 3 | 36 | 31 | +5 | 39 | |
| 9 | Jubbah | 30 | 9 | 11 | 10 | 40 | 36 | +4 | 38 | |
| 10 | Afif | 30 | 9 | 9 | 12 | 35 | 36 | −1 | 36 | |
| 11 | Al-Rawdhah | 30 | 9 | 8 | 13 | 31 | 43 | −12 | 35 (Note: Al-Rawdhah finished ahead of Al-Shoulla on head-to-head points: Al-Rawdhah: 4 pts, Al-Shoulla: 1 pts (Al-Rawdhah 0–0 Jerash, Al-Shoulla 1–2 Al-Rawdhah).) | |
| 12 | Al-Shoulla | 30 | 8 | 11 | 11 | 44 | 48 | −4 | 35 | |
| 13 | Al-Taraji | 30 | 8 | 10 | 12 | 42 | 57 | −15 | 34 | |
| 14 | Al-Sharq | 30 | 6 | 15 | 9 | 32 | 36 | −4 | 33 | |
| 15 | Tuwaiq (R) | 30 | 6 | 10 | 14 | 36 | 51 | −15 | 28 | Relegation to the Third Division |
| 16 | Al-Sadd (R) | 30 | 2 | 8 | 20 | 29 | 65 | −36 | 14 | Relegation to the Third Division |

Updated to match(es) played on 10 April 2026. Source: saff.com.sa
Rules for classification: 1) Points; 2) Head-to-Head points; 3) Head-to-Head goal difference; 4) Head-to-Head goals scored; 5) Total goal difference; 6) Total goals scored; 7) Play-off (only for deciding champion, promotion and relegation).
(P) Promoted; (R) Relegated

=== Results ===
| Home \ Away | AFI | AIN | ENT | JEL | NOJ | RAW | SAD | SAH | SHR | SHO | TAR | WAS | JER | JUB | NAJ | TUW |
|---|---|---|---|---|---|---|---|---|---|---|---|---|---|---|---|---|
| Afif | | 1–2 | 1–4 | 3–2 | 0–0 | 1–1 | 2–1 | 0–2 | 0–0 | 1–3 | 3–1 | 1–1 | 1–2 | 0–0 | 2–0 | 4–0 |
| Al-Ain | 2–1 | | 1–1 | 4–1 | 1–1 | 3–1 | 3–0 | 2–0 | 4–3 | 0–0 | 0–2 | 2–0 | 2–0 | 1–0 | 3–1 | 2–1 |
| Al-Entesar | 1–0 | 2–2 | | 1–0 | 1–1 | 2–1 | 5–1 | 3–3 | 0–0 | 1–1 | 3–0 | 1–0 | 1–1 | 1–1 | 1–2 | 1–2 |
| Al-Jeel | 2–1 | 0–0 | 0–1 | | 1–1 | 2–1 | 3–1 | 0–2 | 2–4 | 4–2 | 3–1 | 0–1 | 3–1 | 2–1 | 1–0 | 1–1 |
| Al-Nojoom | 0–2 | 1–1 | 0–0 | 1–0 | | 3–0 | 2–1 | 2–2 | 1–1 | 0–0 | 1–1 | 2–2 | 1–1 | 2–1 | 2–2 | 0–0 |
| Al-Rawdhah | 2–1 | 1–1 | 0–1 | 0–2 | 1–1 | | 3–2 | 1–5 | 3–1 | 0–0 | 2–3 | 1–1 | 0–1 | 0–0 | 1–1 | 1–0 |
| Al-Sadd | 1–1 | 1–2 | 2–1 | 2–3 | 1–2 | 0–1 | | 0–4 | 1–1 | 1–2 | 0–0 | 1–1 | 1–2 | 0–1 | 1–4 | 1–1 |
| Al-Sahel | 2–0 | 0–0 | 3–0 | 0–2 | 1–1 | 2–1 | 5–1 | | 1–1 | 4–2 | 2–1 | 1–1 | 2–1 | 1–1 | 2–0 | 0–3 |
| Al-Sharq | 0–0 | 1–1 | 0–0 | 1–2 | 0–0 | 0–0 | 2–0 | 1–0 | | 2–2 | 1–0 | 0–0 | 1–3 | 1–1 | 2–1 | 1–2 |
| Al-Shoulla | 1–4 | 2–1 | 0–0 | 1–2 | 2–2 | 1–2 | 0–2 | 0–0 | 2–1 | | 0–2 | 3–1 | 6–4 | 1–2 | 0–3 | 4–1 |
| Al-Taraji | 1–1 | 4–4 | 2–1 | 1–2 | 1–4 | 0–1 | 2–2 | 1–2 | 3–3 | 2–2 | | 0–4 | 2–1 | 2–2 | 1–1 | 3–2 |
| Al-Washm | 3–1 | 2–0 | 0–1 | 0–2 | 0–0 | 1–3 | 4–0 | 0–1 | 1–0 | 3–3 | 5–0 | | 2–0 | 4–3 | 2–0 | 3–1 |
| Jerash | 0–2 | 1–0 | 3–1 | 2–3 | 2–2 | 1–0 | 3–1 | 2–0 | 2–1 | 0–3 | 2–2 | 4–2 | | 3–3 | 0–1 | 3–2 |
| Jubbah | 0–1 | 3–4 | 4–0 | 0–0 | 2–0 | 0–1 | 2–2 | 1–0 | 3–1 | 1–0 | 1–2 | 1–2 | 1–1 | | 3–1 | 1–0 |
| Najran | 2–0 | 2–0 | 4–2 | 1–2 | 3–2 | 3–1 | 2–1 | 0–1 | 0–1 | 1–0 | 1–0 | 1–1 | 0–0 | 1–1 | | 4–3 |
| Tuwaiq | 0–0 | 1–2 | 1–1 | 0–1 | 1–1 | 4–1 | 1–1 | 1–0 | 1–1 | 1–1 | 1–2 | 1–3 | 0–6 | 2–0 | 2–2 | |

Updated to match(es) played on 10 April 2026. Source: saff.com.sa
Legend: Blue = home team win; Yellow = draw; Red = away team win.
For upcoming matches, an "a" indicates there is an article about the rivalry between the two participants.

== Group B ==
=== League table ===
| Pos | Team | Pld | W | D | L | GF | GA | GD | Pts | Promotion, qualification or relegation |
|---|---|---|---|---|---|---|---|---|---|---|
| 1 | Al-Saqer (C, P) | 30 | 21 | 6 | 3 | 59 | 19 | +40 | 69 (Note: Al-Saqer were awarded a 3–0 win over Bisha due to Bisha's inability to hold the fixture. In addition, Bisha were deducted 3 points for the same reason.) | Promotion to the First Division and qualification to the final |
| 2 | Hajer (O, P) | 30 | 20 | 6 | 4 | 47 | 20 | +27 | 66 | Qualification for the promotion play-offs |
| 3 | Al-Lewaa | 30 | 19 | 8 | 3 | 67 | 32 | +35 | 65 | |
| 4 | Mudhar | 30 | 13 | 10 | 7 | 37 | 26 | +11 | 49 | |
| 5 | Al-Rayyan | 30 | 14 | 7 | 9 | 50 | 41 | +9 | 49 | |
| 6 | Al-Nairyah | 30 | 13 | 9 | 8 | 50 | 37 | +13 | 48 | |
| 7 | Hetten | 30 | 13 | 6 | 11 | 39 | 37 | +2 | 45 | |
| 8 | Al-Safa | 30 | 12 | 5 | 13 | 32 | 44 | −12 | 41 | |
| 9 | Al-Qala | 30 | 11 | 7 | 12 | 32 | 32 | 0 | 40 (Note: Al-Qala finished ahead of Al-Kawkab on overall goal difference: Al-Qala +0, Al-Kawkab –6 (Al-Qala 1–0 Al-Kawkab, Al-Kawkab 2–1 Al-Qala).) | |
| 10 | Al-Kawkab | 30 | 11 | 7 | 12 | 33 | 39 | −6 | 40 | |
| 11 | Al-Ghottah | 30 | 9 | 10 | 11 | 43 | 41 | +2 | 37 | |
| 12 | Wej | 30 | 8 | 11 | 11 | 42 | 35 | +7 | 35 | |
| 13 | Al-Qous | 30 | 8 | 9 | 13 | 36 | 41 | −5 | 33 | |
| 14 | Arar | 30 | 8 | 3 | 19 | 38 | 62 | −24 | 27 | |
| 15 | Bisha (R) | 30 | 2 | 7 | 21 | 21 | 58 | −37 | 10 | Relegation to the Third Division |
| 16 | Ohod (R) | 30 | 1 | 3 | 26 | 16 | 78 | −62 | 0 (Note: Ohod were deducted six points for failing to meet payment obligations.) | Relegation to the Third Division |

Updated to match(es) played on 9 April 2026. Source: saff.com.sa
Rules for classification: 1) Points; 2) Head-to-Head points; 3) Head-to-Head goal difference; 4) Head-to-Head goals scored; 5) Total goal difference; 6) Total goals scored; 7) Play-off (only for deciding champion, promotion and relegation).
(C) Champions; (O) Play-off winners; (P) Promoted; (R) Relegated

=== Results ===
| Home \ Away | GHO | KAW | LEW | NAI | QAL | QOU | RAY | SAF | SAQ | ARA | BIS | HJR | HET | MUD | OHD | WEJ |
|---|---|---|---|---|---|---|---|---|---|---|---|---|---|---|---|---|
| Al-Ghottah | | 1–3 | 4–4 | 1–4 | 0–1 | 0–0 | 1–1 | 0–1 | 1–3 | 6–4 | 2–0 | 2–0 | 4–2 | 2–0 | 3–0 | 1–3 |
| Al-Kawkab | 1–1 | | 2–2 | 1–1 | 2–1 | 2–2 | 0–1 | 2–0 | 0–3 | 0–1 | 3–2 | 0–1 | 1–1 | 1–1 | 3–1 | 2–1 |
| Al-Lewaa | 2–1 | 2–0 | | 1–0 | 1–0 | 3–0 | 2–1 | 5–0 | 0–1 | 3–0 | 4–1 | 0–1 | 4–0 | 3–2 | 2–0 | 2–4 |
| Al-Nairyah | 3–1 | 0–1 | 2–2 | | 4–3 | 3–2 | 2–1 | 6–1 | 0–2 | 2–3 | 0–0 | 1–2 | 1–2 | 0–0 | 3–0 | 2–2 |
| Al-Qala | 0–0 | 1–0 | 2–2 | 2–0 | | 1–2 | 1–1 | 0–2 | 0–1 | 3–0 | 1–0 | 0–0 | 0–2 | 1–1 | 1–0 | 1–0 |
| Al-Qous | 1–1 | 0–2 | 1–3 | 2–2 | 1–0 | | 1–3 | 0–1 | 1–1 | 2–1 | 3–0 | 1–1 | 0–0 | 0–2 | 2–1 | 0–2 |
| Al-Rayyan | 2–1 | 3–1 | 0–4 | 1–1 | 1–0 | 0–2 | | 1–1 | 3–2 | 1–2 | 2–2 | 3–2 | 1–0 | 1–2 | 4–1 | 4–3 |
| Al-Safa | 0–0 | 2–2 | 0–1 | 0–1 | 0–2 | 1–0 | 1–2 | | 1–0 | 2–1 | 2–1 | 1–2 | 0–0 | 0–1 | 3–1 | 2–1 |
| Al-Saqer | 1–1 | 2–0 | 1–1 | 2–0 | 2–1 | 1–0 | 3–2 | 3–0 | | 5–1 | 3–0 | 1–1 | 1–1 | 0–1 | 1–0 | 2–2 |
| Arar | 1–3 | 1–2 | 3–4 | 2–3 | 3–0 | 3–2 | 2–2 | 0–2 | 0–3 | | 2–1 | 1–2 | 0–2 | 0–2 | 2–1 | 0–3 |
| Bisha | 0–0 | 0–1 | 1–3 | 0–1 | 0–2 | 1–1 | 0–2 | 2–3 | 0–3 | 2–4 | | 0–2 | 1–0 | 0–1 | 1–1 | 1–1 |
| Hajer | 2–0 | 3–0 | 2–2 | 1–2 | 2–1 | 1–0 | 1–0 | 3–0 | 1–3 | 1–0 | 4–0 | | 3–1 | 2–0 | 2–1 | 1–0 |
| Hetten | 1–0 | 2–0 | 2–2 | 0–1 | 2–3 | 4–2 | 1–3 | 2–1 | 1–2 | 1–0 | 2–0 | 0–1 | | 2–0 | 2–1 | 2–1 |
| Mudhar | 1–1 | 1–0 | 0–0 | 1–1 | 1–1 | 0–1 | 1–0 | 2–2 | 0–2 | 1–0 | 4–1 | 0–0 | 3–0 | | 3–1 | 2–2 |
| Ohod | 0–3 | 0–1 | 0–1 | 1–4 | 1–1 | 0–6 | 0–3 | 2–3 | 0–4 | 0–0 | 0–3 | 0–3 | 1–4 | 0–4 | | 2–1 |
| Wej | 0–2 | 2–0 | 1–2 | 0–0 | 1–2 | 1–1 | 1–1 | 1–0 | 0–1 | 1–1 | 1–1 | 0–0 | 0–0 | 2–0 | 5–0 | |

Updated to match(es) played on 9 April 2026. Source: saff.com.sa
Legend: Blue = home team win; Yellow = draw; Red = away team win.
For upcoming matches, an "a" indicates there is an article about the rivalry between the two participants.

== Promotion play-offs ==
Both teams that finish second in Groups A and B will face each other in a two-legged match, with the winner gaining promotion to the FD League. Al-Ain, who finished second in Group A, will face Hajer, who finished second in Group B. The first leg will be played on 16 April and the second leg on 22 April. Hajer defeated Al-Ain 4–3 on aggregate to secure promotion to the FD League.

| Team 1 | Agg. | Team 2 | 1st leg | 2nd leg |
|---|---|---|---|---|
| Al-Ain | 3–4 | Hajer | 1–3 | 2–1 |

First leg

16 April 2026
19:10

| Al-Ain | 1–3 | Hajer |
|---|---|---|
| Matheus 38' (pen.) | Report | Akono 26', 63'; Langa Lesse 45+5' |

King Saud Sport City Stadium, Al Bahah
Referee: Abdulsamad Bakri

Second leg

22 April 2026
20:10

| Hajer | 1–2 | Al-Ain |
|---|---|---|
| Al-Hurib 90+8' | Report | Andria 56'; Al-Eisa 90+3' |

Hajer Club Stadium, Al-Hasa
Referee: Abdullah Al-Owaidan

== Final ==
The winners of each group will play a single-legged final on 23 April to decide the champion of the 2025–26 Second Division. As winners of Group A, Al-Jeel faced Al-Saqer, the winners of Group B. Al-Saqer defeated Al-Jeel 5–4 on penalties to win their first title.

23 April 2026
20:45 AST

| Al-Saqer | 1–1 (a.e.t.) | Al-Jeel |
|---|---|---|
| Al-Balawi 58' | Report | Ayouni 87' |
Penalties
| Sesugh (penalty scored); Hawsawi (penalty scored); Al-Mutairi (penalty scored); Azema (penalty missed); Al-Qassem (penalty scored); Francis (penalty scored) | 5–4 | (penalty missed) Ayouni; (penalty scored) Al-Qahtani; (penalty scored) Quaye; (penalty scored) Al-Shanqeeti; (penalty scored) Al-Suwaiei; (penalty missed) Al-Jawhar |

Al-Taawoun Club Stadium, Buraidah
Referee: Ali Al-Qahtani

== Statistics ==
As of 23 April 2026

=== Scoring ===
==== Top scorers ====
| Rank | Player | Club | Goals |
|---|---|---|---|
| 1 | (Brazil) Papel | Al-Lewaa | 24 |
| 2 | (Nigeria) Dennis Sesugh | Al-Saqer | 19 |
| 3 | (Democratic Republic of the Congo) Éric Kabwe | Al-Sahel | 18 |
| 4 | (Tunisia) Maher Boulabiar | Al-Nairyah | 17 |
| 4 | (Cameroon) Boris Bissemou | Al-Rayyan | 17 |
| 4 | (Brazil) Matheus Henrique | Al-Ain | 17 |
| 7 | (Madagascar) Carolus Andria | Al-Sadd/Al-Ain | 16 |
| 8 | (Ghana) Maxwell Abbey Quaye | Al-Qala/Al-Jeel | 13 |
| 8 | (Democratic Republic of the Congo) Glody Kilangalanga | Al-Washm | 13 |
| 8 | (Gibraltar) Ayoub El Hmidi | Jubbah | 13 |
| 8 | (Brazil) Vinícius Boff | Arar | 13 |

==== Hat-tricks ====
| Player | For | Against | Result | Date | Ref. |
|---|---|---|---|---|---|
| (Togo) Honoré Kpegba | Jerash | Tuwaiq | 6–0 (A) | 4 October 2025 | |
| (Saudi Arabia) Talal Al-Showaiqi | Wej | Ohod | 5–0 (H) | 6 December 2025 | |
| (Democratic Republic of the Congo) Éric Kabwe^{4} | Al-Sahel | Al-Sadd | 5–1 (H) | 26 December 2025 | |
| (Tunisia) Maher Boulabiar | Al-Nairyah | Ohod | 4–1 (A) | 9 January 2026 | |
| (Democratic Republic of the Congo) Éric Kabwe | Al-Sahel | Al-Rawdhah | 5–1 (A) | 31 January 2026 | |
| (Brazil) Papel | Al-Lewaa | Hetten | 4–0 (H) | 6 March 2026 | |
| (Brazil) Vinícius Boff | Arar | Al-Qous | 3–2 (H) | 9 April 2026 | |
| (Mauritania) Baba Ba | Al-Sharq | Al-Jeel | 4–2 (A) | 10 April 2026 | |
| (Saudi Arabia) Hassan Sharahili | Jerash | Jubbah | 3–3 (H) | 10 April 2026 | |

Note

(H) – Home; (A) – Away
^{4} Player scored 4 goals

== Number of teams by province ==
| Rank | Province | Number | Teams |
|---|---|---|---|
| 1 | Eastern Province | 9 | Al-Jeel, Al-Nairyah, Al-Nojoom, Al-Rawdhah, Al-Safa, Al-Sahel, Al-Taraji, Hajer and Mudhar |
| 2 | Riyadh | 7 | Afif, Al-Kawkab, Al-Sadd, Al-Sharq, Al-Shoulla, Al-Washm, and Tuwaiq |
| 3 | Ha'il | 4 | Al-Ghottah, Al-Lewaa, Al-Rayyan, and Jubbah |
| 4 | Mecca | 3 | Al-Entesar, Al-Qous, and Wej |
| 5 | Asir | 2 | Bisha and Jerash |
| 6 | Al-Bahah | 1 | Al-Ain |
| 6 | Al-Jawf | 1 | Al-Qala |
| 6 | Al-Qassim | 1 | Al-Saqer |
| 6 | Jazan | 1 | Hetten |
| 6 | Medina | 1 | Ohod |
| 6 | Najran | 1 | Najran |
| 6 | Northern Borders | 1 | Arar |

== See also ==
- 2025–26 Saudi Pro League
- 2025–26 Saudi First Division League
- 2025–26 Saudi Third Division
