= 2024–25 Saudi Second Division League =

49th season of the Saudi Second Division

Second Division League
- Season: 2024–25
- Dates: 13 September 2024 – 14 April 2025
- Champions: Al-Diriyah (2nd title)
- Promoted: Al-Diriyah; Al-Ula; Al-Anwar
- Relegated: Al-Taqadom; Al-Houra; Al-Ansar; Al-Qaisumah
- Matches: 483
- Goals: 1,273 (2.64 per match)
- Top goalscorer: Hassan Al-Solan (20 goals)
- Biggest home win: Al-Shoulla 5–0 Al-Sahel (20 September 2024); Wej 5–0 Hetten (21 September 2024); Najran 5–0 Al-Taraji (27 September 2024); Al-Ghottah 7–2 Al-Nojoom (17 October 2024); Jerash 6–1 Al-Sharq (16 November 2024); Al-Sahel 6–1 Al-Houra (14 March 2025)
- Biggest away win: Al-Sahel 0–10 Al-Lewaa (13 September 2024)
- Highest scoring: Al-Sahel 0–10 Al-Lewaa (13 September 2024)
- Longest winning run: Al-Diriyah (8 matches)
- Longest unbeaten run: Al-Anwar; Al-Kawkab (16 matches)
- Longest winless run: Al-Kawkab (15 matches)
- Longest losing run: Al-Qaisumah (13 matches)
- All statistics correct as of 14 April 2025.

The 2024–25 Saudi Second Division League was the fourth season of the Saudi Second Division League after its rebrand, and the 49th season since its establishment in 1976. The season began on 13 September 2024 and concluded with the final on 14 April 2025. The group stage draw was held on 5 June 2024.

The final was played on 14 April 2025 between Al-Diriyah and Al-Ula. Al-Diriyah defeated Al-Ula 1–0 to win their second title and first since 2013.

== Team changes ==
A total of 32 teams contested the league, including 25 sides from the 2023–24 season, 3 relegated teams from the FD League, and 4 promoted teams from the Third Division.

=== To Second Division ===
Promoted from the Third Division

- Al-Ula
- Al-Anwar
- Al-Sharq
- Al-Ghottah

Relegated from FD League

- Hajer
- Al-Qaisumah
- Al-Taraji

=== From Second Division ===
Promoted to FD League

- Neom
- Al-Jubail
- Al-Zulfi

Relegated to the Third Division

- Al-Shaeib
- Afif
- Al-Nairyah
- Al-Noor

== Teams ==
Group A

Locations of teams in the 2024–25 Saudi Second Division Group A

Club	Location	Stadium
Al-Ansar	Medina	Al-Ansar Club Stadium
Al-Ghottah	Mawqaq	Al-Jabalain Club Stadium (Ha'il)
Al-Houra	Umluj	Al-Houra Club Stadium
Al-Jeel	Al-Hasa (Hofuf)	Prince Abdullah bin Jalawi Stadium
Al-Kawkab	Al-Kharj	Al-Shoulla Club Stadium
Al-Lewaa	Baqaa	Al-Lewaa Club Stadium
Al-Nojoom	Al-Hasa (Al-Shuqaiq)	Prince Abdullah bin Jalawi Stadium
Al-Sahel	Qatif	Prince Nayef bin Abdulaziz Stadium
Al-Shoulla	Al-Kharj	Al-Shoulla Club Stadium
Al-Taraji	Qatif	Prince Nayef bin Abdulaziz Stadium
Al-Ula	Al-'Ula	Al-Ansar Club Stadium (Medina)
Arar	Arar	Prince Abdullah bin Abdulaziz bin Musa'ed Sport City Stadium
Bisha	Bisha	Bisha University Stadium
Hajer	Al-Hasa (Hofuf)	Hajer Club Stadium
Mudhar	Qatif	Prince Nayef bin Abdulaziz Stadium
Najran	Najran	Prince Hathloul bin Abdul Aziz Sport City Stadium

Group B

Locations of teams in the 2024–25 Saudi Second Division Group B

Club	Location	Stadium
Al-Anwar	Hotat Bani Tamim	Al-Anwar Club Stadium
Al-Diriyah	Diriyah	Al-Diriyah Club Stadium
Al-Entesar	Rabigh	Al-Entesar Club Stadium
Al-Qaisumah	Qaisumah	Al-Batin Club Stadium (Hafar al-Batin)
Al-Qous	Al Khurmah	Al-Qous Club Stadium
Al-Rawdhah	Al-Hasa (Al-Jeshah)	Al-Rawdhah Club Stadium
Al-Rayyan	Haʼil	Al-Jabalain Club Stadium
Al-Sadd	Ad-Dilam (Najaan)	Al-Anwar Club Stadium (Hotat Bani Tamim)
Al-Saqer	Buraidah (Al-Basr)	Al-Taawoun Club Stadium
Al-Sharq	Ad-Dilam	Al-Shoulla Club Stadium (Al-Kharj)
Al-Taqadom	Al Mithnab	Al-Taqadom Club Stadium
Al-Washm	Shaqra	Al-Washm Club Stadium
Hetten	Samtah	King Faisal Sport City Stadium (Jizan)
Jerash	Ahad Rafidah	Prince Sultan bin Abdul Aziz Reserve Stadium (Abha)
Tuwaiq	Al Zulfi	Al-Zulfi Club Stadium
Wej	Ta'if	King Fahd Stadium

== Foreign players ==
On 9 March 2024, the Saudi FF announced that the number of foreign players would be decreased from 5 players to 4 players.

Players name in bold indicates the player is registered during the mid-season transfer window.

Players name in italics indicates the player is out of squad or has left the club during the mid-season transfer window.

Club	Player 1	Player 2	Player 3	Player 4	Former players
Al-Ansar	(Egypt) Ahmad Hamdi				
Al-Anwar	(Brazil) Alyson Romeu	(Ivory Coast) Guillaume Daho	(Ivory Coast) Louis Abrogoua	(Tunisia) Montasser Toumi	
Al-Diriyah	(Brazil) Arthur Rezende	(Cape Verde) Júlio Tavares	(Mali) Moussa Marega	(Spain) Agi Dambelley	
Al-Entesar	(Egypt) Mohammad Fouad	(Niger) Abdoulaye Katkoré	(Nigeria) Dennis Sesugh	(Tunisia) **Sameh Bouhajeb**	(Madagascar) Zotsara Randriambololona
Al-Ghottah	(Algeria) Hamza Banouh	(Tunisia) Ahmed Amara	(Tunisia) Omar Lamti	(Tunisia) **Fahmi Maaouani**	(Tunisia) Zied Jebali
Al-Houra	(Algeria) **Abdeldjalil Mancer**	(Egypt) Mohamad Abdelwahab	(Ghana) Emmanuel Mensah	(Tunisia) **Rabii Bouzid**	(Egypt) Nader Moussa (Egypt) Mostafa Yousri
Al-Jeel	(Brazil) Edilson Júnior	(Brazil) Teco	(Cameroon) **Alain Akono**	(Tunisia) Oussema Ben Ayed	(Morocco) Adnane El Ouardy
Al-Kawkab	(Nigeria) Israel Abia	(Rwanda) Olivier Kwizera	(Tunisia) Aymen Trabelsi	(Tunisia) Mehdi Bensib	
Al-Lewaa	(Brazil) Júninho	(France) Sofiane Dia	(Nigeria) Mathew Boniface	(Switzerland) Raël Lolala	
Al-Nojoom	(Algeria) Foudil Idriss	(Republic of the Congo) Varel Rozan	(The Gambia) Abdoulie Kassama	(Rwanda) Steve Rubanguka	
Al-Qaisumah	(Mauritania) Ismail Diakhité	(Mauritania) Saïd Sidi Baba	(Tunisia) **Houssin Messadi**	(Tunisia) Hakim Teka	(Algeria) Amar Djabou
Al-Qous	(Egypt) Ibrahim Eisa	(Egypt) **Ahmed Turk**	(Nigeria) Owen Atikor	(Togo) Honoré Kpegba	(Morocco) Imad Riadi
Al-Rawdhah	(Ghana) Lawson Bekui	(Ivory Coast) Sylla Daouda	(Madagascar) Carolus Andriamatsinoro	(Morocco) Zakaria Lahlali	
Al-Rayyan	(Chad) Maher Sharoma	(Tunisia) Mahmoud Ben Salah	(Tunisia) Sabri Ameri	(Tunisia) Youssef Trabelsi	
Al-Sadd	(Bahrain) Mohammed Hanash	(Nigeria) Nwangwa Nyima	(Tunisia) Mondher Guesmi	(Tunisia) Skander Ben Afia	
Al-Sahel	(Algeria) **Khaled Nèche**	(Nigeria) Chidiebere Nwakali	(Tunisia) **Borhane Hakimi**	(Tunisia) Rafik Kamergi	(Brazil) Júnior Araújo
Al-Saqer	(Republic of the Congo) Bercy Langa Lesse	(Democratic Republic of the Congo) Éric Kabwe	(Tunisia) Bassam Deli	(Tunisia) Omar Smari	
Al-Sharq	(Brazil) Pablo Vinicius	(Cameroon) Boris Bissemou	(Cameroon) Duval Wapiwo	(Tunisia) Houssem Chebli	
Al-Shoulla	(Tunisia) Mohamed Aouichi				(Brazil) Taylon Correa (Brazil) Coutinho (Tunisia) Wael Ben Othmane (Tunisia) Aziz Chtioui
Al-Taqadom	(Egypt) Ahmed Fawzy	(Egypt) Gaber Salem	(Egypt) Khalid Salah	(Egypt) Mahmoud El Ghazaly	
Al-Taraji	(Iceland) Árni Vilhjálmsson	(Portugal) Pedro Paz			
Al-Ula	(Brazil) Eduardo Henrique	(Brazil) **Tiago Bezerra**	(Morocco) Ismael Mokadem	(Togo) **Khaled Narey**	(Brazil) Allan Sousa (Guinea) Ousmane Barry
Al-Washm	(Democratic Republic of the Congo) **Stevie Mundele**	(The Gambia) **Babou Cham**	(Morocco) Redouane El Karoui	(Morocco) Soufiane Yakhlef	(Morocco) Zakaria Maknoun (Portugal) Rafa Miranda
Arar	(Ghana) Frederick Acheampong	(Tunisia) Maher Boulabiar	(Tunisia) Mohamed Saghraoui		(Cape Verde) Dodô
Bisha	(Algeria) Abdelhakim Amokrane	(Cameroon) Fabrice Onana	(Mauritania) Cheikh Saadné	(Tunisia) Jilani Abdessalam	
Hajer	(Brazil) Isael	(Ivory Coast) Ibrahim Diomandé	(Senegal) Bakary Coulibaly	(Tunisia) Alaeddine Marzouki	
Hetten	(Rwanda) Ally Niyonzima	(Syria) Mahmoud Al-Youssef			(Brazil) Carlos Coppetti (Ivory Coast) Roland Zan Bi
Jerash	(Brazil) Gabriel Marques	(Brazil) Téssio	(Morocco) **Adnane El Ouardy**	(Mozambique) **Gildo Vilanculos**	(Brazil) Thoni Brandão (Tunisia) Sameh Bouhajeb
Mudhar	(Ivory Coast) Oscar Tahi	(Tunisia) Achraf Ben Dhiaf	(Tunisia) Fares Meskini		(Tunisia) Houssin Messadi
Najran	(Angola) Aneel Bakaki	(Benin) Marcellin Koukpo	(Ghana) Samuel Sarfo	(Ivory Coast) Alfa Diané	
Tuwaiq	(Guinea-Bissau) Piqueti	(Tunisia) Mourad Zahou	(Tunisia) Othman Saidi		(Brazil) Gabriel Correia
Wej	(Brazil) Guilherme Andrade	(Democratic Republic of the Congo) Glody Kilangalanga	(Morocco) Hicham Nouali	(Tunisia) Elyes Brini	

== Group A ==
=== League table ===
Pos	Team	Pld	W	D	L	GF	GA	GD	Pts	Promotion, qualification or relegation
1	Al-Ula (P)	30	19	8	3	58	26	+32	65	Promotion to the First Division and qualification to the final
2	Al-Jeel	30	18	8	4	64	22	+42	62 (Note: Al-Jeel finished ahead of Al-Shoulla on head-to-head goal difference: Al-Jeel +1 GD, Al-Shoulla –1 GD (Al-Jeel 2–0 Al-Shoulla, Al-Shoulla 1–0 Al-Jeel).)	Qualification for the promotion play-offs
3	Al-Shoulla	30	19	5	6	58	25	+33	62	
4	Hajer	30	12	7	11	38	42	−4	43 (Note: Hajer finished ahead of Al-Lewaa on head-to-head goal difference: Hajer +1 GD, Al-Lewaa –1 GD (Hajer 1–2 Al-Lewaa, Al-Lewaa 2–4 Hajer).)	
5	Al-Lewaa	30	12	7	11	43	36	+7	43	
6	Arar	30	11	8	11	38	44	−6	41 (Note: Arar finished ahead of Najran on head-to-head points: Arar: 6 pts, Najran: 0 pts (Najran 1–2 Arar, Arar 2–1 Najran).)	
7	Najran	30	10	11	9	41	31	+10	41	
8	Al-Kawkab	30	8	15	7	38	34	+4	39 (Note: Al-Kawkab finished ahead of Al-Ghottah on head-to-head points: Al-Kawkab: 4 pts, Al-Ghottah: 1 pts (Al-Ghottah 0–2 Al-Kawkab, Al-Kawkab 1–1 Al-Ghottah).)	
9	Al-Ghottah	30	9	12	9	40	32	+8	39	
10	Al-Sahel	30	10	6	14	41	58	−17	36	
11	Al-Taraji	30	7	12	11	29	44	−15	33	
12	Al-Nojoom	30	8	8	14	33	43	−10	32 (Note: Al-Nojoom were awarded a 3–0 win over Bisha due to Bisha's inability to hold the fixture. In addition, Bisha were deducted 3 points for the same reason.) (Note: Al-Nojoom finished ahead of Bisha on head-to-head points: Al-Nojoom: 6 pts, Bisha: 0 pts (Al-Nojoom 3–0 Bisha, Bisha 1–2 Al-Nojoom).)	
13	Bisha	30	9	8	13	38	48	−10	32	
14	Mudhar	30	7	9	14	26	40	−14	30	
15	Al-Houra (R)	30	7	5	18	27	58	−31	26	Relegation to the Third Division
16	Al-Ansar (R)	30	6	7	17	23	52	−29	25	Relegation to the Third Division

Source: saff.com.sa
Rules for classification: 1) Points; 2) Head-to-Head points; 3) Head-to-Head goal difference; 4) Head-to-Head goals scored; 5) Total goal difference; 6) Total goals scored; 7) Play-off (only for deciding champion, promotion and relegation).
(P) Promoted; (R) Relegated

=== Results ===
Home \ Away	ANS	GHO	HOU	JEL	KAW	LEW	NOJ	SAH	SHO	TAR	ULA	ARA	BIS	HJR	MUD	NAJ
Al-Ansar		0–1	2–1	2–1	3–1	0–2	2–1	1–3	1–0	2–2	0–3	0–1	1–1	0–2	0–0	0–0
Al-Ghottah	4–0		0–1	1–1	0–2	1–1	7–2	4–1	1–1	0–0	0–1	1–1	3–0	2–0	1–0	1–1
Al-Houra	2–1	0–2		0–1	3–3	1–2	1–0	1–0	1–6	1–0	0–2	2–0	0–2	3–4	1–0	0–0
Al-Jeel	3–0	1–0	4–0		1–1	1–0	3–2	3–0	2–0	1–2	2–2	3–0	2–0	1–1	4–0	0–0
Al-Kawkab	1–1	1–1	0–0	0–4		4–0	1–2	1–0	3–2	5–1	0–0	0–0	1–3	0–0	2–1	1–1
Al-Lewaa	0–0	1–1	3–0	0–2	0–0		2–2	2–1	1–0	2–0	0–1	2–3	1–0	2–4	2–0	1–1
Al-Nojoom	2–2	0–0	0–0	0–2	0–1	0–1		1–1	0–2	1–0	0–2	0–0	3–0	0–1	1–3	1–2
Al-Sahel	3–1	2–0	6–1	2–5	1–0	0–10	3–2		0–1	1–1	1–3	3–1	0–0	2–1	0–1	0–0
Al-Shoulla	4–0	1–1	4–0	1–0	2–1	3–2	2–2	5–0		1–0	0–1	2–0	2–1	3–1	3–1	0–0
Al-Taraji	1–0	3–2	2–1	0–4	1–1	3–0	0–0	3–3	2–3		1–1	0–1	1–0	1–1	1–1	1–0
Al-Ula	1–0	4–0	4–4	3–2	1–1	2–0	1–2	1–0	0–1	4–2		3–2	1–3	1–1	1–0	1–1
Arar	5–1	1–2	4–1	3–3	0–2	0–0	2–1	1–5	2–0	1–1	2–4		0–0	1–1	1–0	2–1
Bisha	2–0	2–1	1–0	1–1	3–3	2–1	1–2	3–1	0–2	0–0	0–6	3–0		0–3	4–4	2–3
Hajer	0–1	3–2	1–0	0–5	1–0	1–2	0–2	1–2	1–3	2–0	0–0	2–1	2–2		2–0	2–1
Mudhar	2–1	0–0	2–1	1–1	1–1	1–2	0–2	0–0	0–0	0–0	0–2	0–1	3–2	2–0		0–2
Najran	3–1	1–1	2–1	0–1	1–1	2–1	1–2	4–0	1–4	5–0	1–2	1–2	1–0	3–0	2–3	

Updated to match(es) played on 14 March 2025. Source: saff.com.sa
Legend: Blue = home team win; Yellow = draw; Red = away team win.
For upcoming matches, an "a" indicates there is an article about the rivalry between the two participants.

== Group B ==
=== League table ===
Pos	Team	Pld	W	D	L	GF	GA	GD	Pts	Promotion, qualification or relegation
1	Al-Diriyah (C, P)	30	24	2	4	65	28	+37	74	Promotion to the First Division and qualification to the final
2	Al-Anwar (O, P)	30	17	8	5	46	24	+22	59	Qualification for the promotion play-offs
3	Al-Saqer	30	17	7	6	51	26	+25	58	
4	Jerash	30	17	6	7	57	29	+28	57	
5	Al-Sharq	30	14	10	6	53	35	+18	52	
6	Al-Rawdhah	30	11	7	12	34	35	−1	40	
7	Wej	30	10	8	12	40	43	−3	38	
8	Al-Washm	30	9	10	11	51	51	0	37 (Note: Al-Washm were awarded a 3–0 win over Al-Sadd due to Al-Sadd's inability to hold the fixture. In addition, Al-Sadd were deducted 3 points for the same reason.) (Note: Positions determined by head-to-head points: Al-Washm: 8 pts; Al-Entesar: 5 pts; Al-Rayyan: 2 pts.)	
9	Al-Entesar	30	9	10	11	46	41	+5	37	
10	Al-Rayyan	30	9	10	11	35	41	−6	37	
11	Al-Qous	30	8	12	10	26	30	−4	36	
12	Hetten	30	9	6	15	30	48	−18	33	
13	Al-Sadd	30	10	5	15	29	37	−8	32	
14	Tuwaiq	30	8	7	15	34	53	−19	31	
15	Al-Taqadom (R)	30	7	7	16	19	42	−23	28	Relegation to the Third Division
16	Al-Qaisumah (R)	30	3	1	26	19	72	−53	10	Relegation to the Third Division

Source: saff.com.sa
Rules for classification: 1) Points; 2) Head-to-Head points; 3) Head-to-Head goal difference; 4) Head-to-Head goals scored; 5) Total goal difference; 6) Total goals scored; 7) Play-off (only for deciding champion, promotion and relegation).
(C) Champions; (O) Play-off winners; (P) Promoted; (R) Relegated

=== Results ===
Home \ Away	ANW	DIR	ENT	QAI	QOU	RAW	RAY	SAD	SAQ	SHR	TAQ	WAS	HET	JER	TUW	WEJ
Al-Anwar		0–1	1–0	1–0	1–1	2–0	1–0	3–1	1–1	2–2	3–0	1–1	1–0	0–0	0–1	1–0
Al-Diriyah	0–1		2–1	4–0	2–1	3–2	2–2	3–1	2–1	3–0	3–1	3–3	1–0	2–1	4–1	1–0
Al-Entesar	2–1	1–2		4–1	1–1	1–1	2–0	1–0	1–2	0–0	2–0	2–2	0–1	0–1	4–1	5–4
Al-Qaisumah	0–4	0–2	4–2		1–0	1–2	0–1	0–1	0–2	0–6	0–2	2–2	2–5	0–3	0–1	1–3
Al-Qous	2–2	0–4	2–1	2–1		1–0	0–0	1–0	0–0	0–1	3–0	1–2	1–1	0–0	0–0	2–0
Al-Rawdhah	1–2	1–3	0–0	1–0	1–0		1–3	2–0	1–4	2–2	0–0	2–2	3–0	1–1	2–0	0–2
Al-Rayyan	2–2	1–2	3–3	1–0	1–2	1–2		1–3	0–0	1–3	1–2	2–2	2–1	3–2	1–0	1–1
Al-Sadd	1–2	3–1	1–1	1–0	0–1	0–1	2–2		1–0	1–3	1–1	1–0	2–0	0–3	1–1	3–0
Al-Saqer	3–0	4–1	0–0	2–0	2–1	0–0	3–0	1–0		0–0	1–2	3–1	1–2	3–2	1–2	3–1
Al-Sharq	1–1	1–0	0–1	2–0	2–1	4–2	1–1	2–0	0–2		2–2	0–1	4–1	5–1	3–1	1–1
Al-Taqadom	0–4	0–1	1–1	0–1	0–0	1–0	0–1	0–2	0–2	0–1		1–0	0–0	1–1	1–0	0–3
Al-Washm	1–3	1–2	3–1	3–1	4–1	0–2	3–1	3–0	1–3	2–2	1–3		1–2	3–1	2–6	0–0
Hetten	1–2	0–5	1–0	4–0	0–0	0–3	0–2	0–1	0–2	2–0	2–1	2–2		2–3	1–0	1–1
Jerash	0–1	0–1	3–1	5–1	1–0	1–0	1–0	0–0	4–1	6–1	3–0	1–0	2–0		5–1	4–1
Tuwaiq	0–2	1–3	1–6	4–3	1–1	0–1	0–0	2–1	1–1	1–4	2–0	1–1	1–1	0–1		3–1
Wej	2–1	0–2	2–2	2–0	1–1	1–0	0–1	2–1	2–3	0–0	1–0	1–4	5–0	1–1	2–1	

Updated to match(es) played on 15 March 2025. Source: saff.com.sa
Legend: Blue = home team win; Yellow = draw; Red = away team win.
For upcoming matches, an "a" indicates there is an article about the rivalry between the two participants.

== Promotion play-offs ==
Both teams that finish second in Groups A and B will face each other in a two-legged match with the winner gaining promotion to the FD League. Al-Jeel, who finished second in Group A, faced Al-Anwar, who finished second in Group B. The first leg was played on 5 April and the second leg on 10 April. Al-Anwar defeated Al-Jeel 3–1 on penalties (after a 1–1 draw on aggregate) to secure promotion to the FD League.

Team 1	Agg.	Team 2	1st leg	2nd leg
Al-Anwar	1–1 (3–1 p)	Al-Jeel	0–1	1–0 (a.e.t.)

First leg

5 April 2025
20:05

Al-Anwar	0–1	Al-Jeel
	Report	Akono 21'

Al-Anwar Club Stadium, Hotat Bani Tamim
Referee: Khalid Al-Ahmari

Second leg

10 April 2025
20:05

Al-Jeel	0–1 (a.e.t.)	Al-Anwar
	Report	Abrogoua 73'
Penalties
Al-Solan (penalty missed); Faleh (penalty scored); Hawsawi (penalty missed); Al-Lazam (penalty missed)	1–3	(penalty scored) Toumi; (penalty scored) Al-Jamaan; (penalty scored) Al-Meatesh

Prince Abdullah bin Jalawi Sport City, Al-Hasa
Referee: Fareeh Al-Jaloud

== Final ==
The winners of each group played a single-legged final on 14 April to decide the champion of the 2024–25 Second Division. As winners of Group A, Al-Ula faced Al-Diriyah, the winners of Group B. Al-Diriyah defeated Al-Ula 1–0 to win their second title and first since 2013.

14 April 2025
20:15 AST

Al-Diriyah	1–0	Al-Ula
Marega 54'	Report

Al-Awwal Park, Riyadh
Attendance: 18,673
Referee: Abdullah Al-Kharboush

== Statistics ==
As of 14 April 2024

=== Scoring ===
==== Top scorers ====
Rank	Player	Club	Goals
1	(Saudi Arabia) Hassan Al-Solan	Al-Jeel	20
2	(Republic of the Congo) Bercy Langa Lesse	Al-Saqer	17
2	(Mali) Moussa Marega	Al-Diriyah	17
4	(Democratic Republic of the Congo) Éric Kabwe	Al-Saqer	16
5	(Tunisia) Jilani Abdessalam	Bisha	15
6	(Morocco) Redouane El Karoui	Al-Washm	14
7	(Cameroon) Boris Bissemou	Al-Sharq	13
7	(Ivory Coast) Ibrahim Diomandé	Hajer	13
9	(Brazil) Téssio	Jerash	12
9	(Brazil) Tiago Bezerra	Al-Ula	12

==== Hat-tricks ====
Player	For	Against	Result	Date	Ref.
(Switzerland) Raël Lolala	Al-Lewaa	Al-Sahel	10–0 (A)	13 September 2024	
(Saudi Arabia) Saud Al-Baqawi	Al-Lewaa	Al-Sahel	10–0 (A)	13 September 2024	
(Saudi Arabia) Majed Al-Mutairi^{6}	Al-Shoulla	Al-Houra	6–1 (A)	13 September 2024	
(Saudi Arabia) Majed Al-Mutairi	Al-Shoulla	Al-Sahel	5–0 (H)	20 September 2024	
(Egypt) Mohammad Fouad	Al-Entesar	Tuwaiq	6–1 (A)	21 October 2024	
(Brazil) Téssio	Jerash	Wej	4–1 (H)	1 November 2024	
(Saudi Arabia) Abdullah Al-Sulaiti	Al-Ghottah	Al-Sahel	4–1 (H)	22 November 2024	
(Saudi Arabia) Maher Hawsawi	Al-Kawkab	Al-Lewaa	4–0 (H)	23 November 2024	
(Tunisia) Othman Saidi	Tuwaiq	Al-Washm	6–2 (A)	5 December 2024	
(Iceland) Árni Vilhjálmsson	Al-Taraji	Al-Ghottah	3–2 (H)	14 December 2024	
(Saudi Arabia) Hassan Al-Solan	Al-Jeel	Al-Houra	4–0 (H)	29 January 2025	
(Cameroon) Alain Akono	Al-Jeel	Al-Kawkab	4–0 (A)	2 February 2025	
(Brazil) Tiago Bezerra	Al-Ula	Al-Jeel	3–2 (H)	14 February 2025	
(Ghana) Frederick Acheampong	Arar	Al-Jeel	3–3 (H)	7 March 2025	
(Saudi Arabia) Abdulaziz Al-Hassani	Al-Sahel	Al-Houra	6–1 (H)	14 March 2025	

Note

(H) – Home; (A) – Away
^{6} Player scored 6 goals

== Number of teams by province ==
Rank	Province	Number	Teams
1	Eastern Province	8	Al-Jeel, Al-Nojoom, Al-Qaisumah, Al-Rawdhah, Al-Sahel, Al-Taraji, Hajer and Mudhar
1	Riyadh	8	Al-Anwar, Al-Diriyah, Al-Kawkab, Al-Sadd, Al-Sharq, Al-Shoulla, Al-Washm, and Tuwaiq
3	Ha'il	3	Al-Ghottah, Al-Lewaa and Al-Rayyan
3	Mecca	3	Al-Entesar, Al-Qous, and Wej
5	Al-Qassim	2	Al-Saqer and Al-Taqadom
5	Asir	2	Bisha and Jerash
5	Medina	2	Al-Ansar and Al-Ula
8	Jazan	1	Hetten
8	Najran	1	Najran
8	Northern Borders	1	Arar
8	Tabuk	1	Al-Houra

== See also ==
- 2024–25 Saudi Pro League
- 2024–25 Saudi First Division League
- 2024–25 Saudi Third Division
