= 2017–18 Saudi Second Division =

Saudi Second Division
- Season: 2017–18
- Champions: Al-Washm (1st title)
- Promoted: Al-Washm; Al-Jabalain; Al-Jeel; Al-Ansar; Al-Ain; Al-Adalh; Abha
- Relegated: Al-Badaya
- Matches: 184
- Goals: 465 (2.53 per match)
- Top goalscorer: Hossam Al-Shadhli (19 goals)
- Biggest home win: Al-Jabalain 6–1 Al-Diriyah (17 November 2017); Hetten 6–1 Al-Adalah (9 February 2018)
- Biggest away win: Al-Jabalain 0–3 Hetten (8 December 2017); Al-Riyadh 0–3 Al-Jubail (19 January 2018); Al-Kholood 0–3 Al-Jabalain (19 January 2018); Al-Sharq 0–3 Al-Taqadom (2 March 2018)
- Highest scoring: Al-Diriyah 4–4 Al-Badaya (2 March 2018)
- Longest winning run: Al-Ansar (6 matches)
- Longest unbeaten run: Al-Jabalain (9 matches)
- Longest winless run: Al-Sharq (9 matches)
- Longest losing run: Al-Diriyah; Wej (5 matches)

The 2017–18 Saudi Second Division was the 42nd season of the Saudi Second Division since its establishment in 1976.

The season featured 13 teams from the 2016–17 campaign, three new teams relegated from the 2016–17 First Division: Al-Adalh, Al-Jeel and Wej, and four new teams promoted from the 2016–17 Third Division: Al-Kholood as champions, Al-Hejaz as runners-up, Al-Taqadom as third place and Al-Jubail as fourth place. The league began on 19 October 2017 and ended on 17 March 2018.

== Team changes ==
The following teams have changed division since the 2016–17 season.

=== To Second Division ===
Promoted from 2016–17 Third Division

- Al-Kholood
- Al-Hejaz
- Al-Taqadom
- Al-Jubail

Relegated from 2016–17 First Division

- Al-Adalh
- Al-Jeel
- Wej

=== From Second Division ===
Promoted to Prince Mohammad bin Salman League

- Al-Kawkab
- Jeddah
- Al-Mujazzal

Relegated to 2017–18 Third Division

- Sdoos
- Al-Najma
- Al-Safa
- Al-Taraji

== Teams ==
;Group A

Locations of teams in the 2017–18 Saudi Second Division Group A

Club	Location	Stadium
Abha	Abha	Prince Sultan bin Abdul Aziz Stadium
Al-Adalh	Al-Hasa	Reserve Stadium in Prince Abdullah bin Jalawi Stadium
Al-Ansar	Medina	Al-Ansar Club Stadium
Al-Badaya	Al Bukayriyah	Al-Amal Club Stadium
Al-Diriyah	Diriyah	Reserve Stadium in Prince Faisal bin Fahd Stadium (Riyadh)
Al-Jabalain	Ha'il	Prince Abdul Aziz bin Musa'ed Stadium
Al-Jubail	Jubail	Al-Jubail Club Stadium
Al-Kholood	Ar Rass	Al Hazm Club Stadium
Al-Riyadh	Riyadh	Prince Turki bin Abdulaziz Stadium
Hetten	Samtah	Reserve Stadium in King Abdullah Sports City (Jeddah)

Group B

Locations of teams in the 2017–18 Saudi Second Division Group B

Club	Location	Stadium
Al-Ain	Al Atawilah	King Saud Sport City Stadium (Al Bahah)
Al-Hejaz	Baljurashi	King Saud Sport City Stadium (Al Bahah)
Al-Jeel	Al-Hasa	Reserve Stadium in Prince Abdullah bin Jalawi Stadium
Al-Muzahimiyyah	Al-Muzahmiyya	Ergah Stadium
Al-Sharq	Ad Dilam	Al-Shoulla Club Stadium (Al-Kharj)
Al-Suqoor	Tabuk	King Khalid Sport City Stadium
Al-Taqadom	Al Mithnab	Al-Najma Club Stadium (Unaizah)
Al-Thoqbah	Khobar	Prince Saud bin Jalawi Stadium
Al-Washm	Shaqra	Al-Washm Club Stadium
Wej	Ta'if	King Fahd Stadium

== Group A ==
Table

Pos	Team	Pld	W	D	L	GF	GA	GD	Pts	Promotion, qualification or relegation
1	Al-Jabalain (P)	18	11	3	4	24	11	+13	36	Promotion to Prince Mohammad bin Salman League and Qualification to the Final
2	Al-Ansar (P)	18	11	2	5	26	15	+11	35	Promotion to Prince Mohammad bin Salman League
3	Al-Adalh (P)	18	9	3	6	26	27	−1	30	Promotion to Prince Mohammad bin Salman League
4	Abha (O, P)	18	7	6	5	20	22	−2	27	Qualification to Promotion play-offs
5	Hetten	18	7	5	6	36	25	+11	26	
6	Al-Kholood	18	6	7	5	18	16	+2	25	
7	Al-Jubail	18	5	4	9	19	20	−1	19	
8	Al-Riyadh	18	4	5	9	16	25	−9	17	
9	Al-Badaya (R)	18	3	7	8	16	27	−11	16	Qualification to Relegation play-offs
10	Al-Diriyah (O)	18	3	6	9	18	31	−13	15	Qualification to Relegation play-offs

Source: Kooora
Rules for classification: 1) Points; 2) Total goal difference; 3) Head-to-Head points; 4) Head-to-Head goal difference; 5) Head-to-Head goal scored; 6) Total goals scored; 7) Play-off (only for deciding champion, promotion and relegation).
(O) Play-off winners; (P) Promoted; (R) Relegated

== Group B ==
Table

Pos	Team	Pld	W	D	L	GF	GA	GD	Pts	Promotion, qualification or relegation
1	Al-Washm (C, P)	18	10	5	3	29	19	+10	35	Promotion to Prince Mohammad bin Salman League and Qualification to the Final
2	Al-Jeel (P)	18	9	4	5	25	17	+8	31 (Note: Al-Jeel finished ahead of Al-Ain on overall goal difference: Al-Jeel +8, Al-Ain +6 (Al-Ain 1–1 Al-Jeel, Al-Jeel 1–1 Al-Ain).)	Promotion to Prince Mohammad bin Salman League
3	Al-Ain (P)	18	8	7	3	28	22	+6	31	Promotion to Prince Mohammad bin Salman League
4	Al-Taqadom	18	7	7	4	23	16	+7	28	Qualification to Promotion play-offs
5	Al-Muzahimiyyah	18	7	6	5	23	16	+7	27	Qualification to Promotion play-offs
6	Al-Hejaz	18	6	6	6	24	29	−5	24	
7	Al-Suqoor	18	5	5	8	21	26	−5	20	
8	Al-Sharq	18	3	7	8	20	27	−7	16 (Note: Al-Sharq finished ahead of Al-Thoqbah on head-to-head points: Al-Sharq 2–0 Al-Thoqbah, Al-Thoqbah 1–1 Al-Sharq.)	
9	Al-Thoqbah (O)	18	3	7	8	22	30	−8	16	Qualification to Relegation play-offs
10	Wej (O)	18	3	4	11	20	33	−13	13	Qualification to Relegation play-offs

Source: Kooora
Rules for classification: 1) Points; 2) Total goal difference; 3) Head-to-Head points; 4) Head-to-Head goal difference; 5) Head-to-Head goal scored; 6) Total goals scored; 7) Play-off (only for deciding champion, promotion and relegation).
(C) Champions; (O) Play-off winners; (P) Promoted

== Final ==
The winners of each group will play a two-legged final to decide the champion of the 2017–18 Second Division. The first leg is scheduled to be played on 9 March and the second leg on 17 March.

Team 1	Agg.	Team 2	1st leg	2nd leg
Al-Washm	3–2	Al-Jabalain	2–1	1–1

First leg

9 March 2018
16:00

Al-Washm	2–1	Al-Jabalain
Dagriri 60'; Sufyani 82'	Report	Al-Ruwaili 43'

Al-Washm Club Stadium, Shaqra

Second leg

17 March 2018
20:25

Al-Jabalain	1–1	Al-Washm
Al-Sowaidi 10'	Report	Al-Mogren 45'

Prince Abdul Aziz bin Musa'ed Stadium, Ha'il

== Third place play-off ==
Al-Jeel, who finished 2nd in Group B will face Al-Ansar who finished 2nd in Group A for a two-legged play-off to decide the third-placed team. Al-Jeel defeated Al-Ansar 5–1 on aggregate to finish in third place.

Team 1	Agg.	Team 2	1st leg	2nd leg
Al-Jeel	5–1	Al-Ansar	2–1	3–0

First leg

9 March 2018
15:40

Al-Jeel	2–1	Al-Ansar
Al-Khamis 19'; Al-Dossari 45+1'	Report	Al-Muwallad 40'

Reserve Stadium in Prince Abdullah bin Jalawi Stadium, Al-Hasa

Second leg

15 March 2018
16:20

Al-Ansar	0–3	Al-Jeel
	Report	Shengeeti 19', 57'; Al-Hamdan 40'

Al-Ansar Club Stadium, Medina

== Relegation play-offs ==
On March 7, 2018, the Saudi Football Federation announced that the number of teams in the Second Division was increased from 20 teams to 24 teams. The relegation was removed and in its place, they announced a relegation play-off. The bottom 2 teams in each group will face the top 4 teams outside the Quarter-finals in the Saudi Third Division.

Team 1	Agg.	Team 2	1st leg	2nd leg
Al-Thoqbah	1–1 (a)	Al-Nakhil	0–0	1–1
Al-Badaya	2–4	Afif	2–2	0–2
Al-Diriyah	2–1	Al-Oyoon	2–1	0–0
Wej	5–1	Al-Tuhami	3–1	2–0

29 March 2018
16:00

Al-Badaya	2–2	Afif
Al-Shamrani 68'; Al-Muhaimeed 88' (pen.)		Saadi 37'; Eid 86'

Al-Amal Club Stadium, Al Bukayriyah
Referee: Mishari Al-Balawi
6 April 2018
16:00

Afif	2–0	Al-Badaya
Saadi 3'; Al-Otaibi 38' (pen.)

Al-Dera'a Club Stadium, Dawadmi

30 March 2018
15:35

Al-Thoqbah	0–0	Al-Nakhil

Prince Saud bin Jalawi Stadium, Khobar
Referee: Mohammed Al-Amri
6 April 2018
16:15

Al-Nakhil	1–1	Al-Thoqbah
Al-Bishi 60'		Al-Enezi 75'

Al-Nakhil Club Stadium, Bisha

30 March 2018
15:45

Al-Diriyah	2–1	Al-Oyoon
Al-Shwier 45+2'; Awadh 90+3'		Al-Ibrahim 90+4'

Leadership Development Institute Stadium, Riyadh
Referee: Abdullah Al-Kharboush
6 April 2018
15:35

Al-Oyoon	0–0	Al-Diriyah

Prince Abdullah bin Jalawi Stadium, Al-Hasa

30 March 2018
16:20

Wej	3–1	Al-Tuhami
Al-Harthi 42' (pen.); Al-Dossari 47'; Al-Nofeai 82'	Report	Ghashim 26'

King Fahd Stadium, Ta'if
Referee: Mohammed Al-Buraidi
6 April 2018
16:20

Al-Tuhami	0–2	Wej
		Al-Dossari 26'; Al-Malki 47'

King Faisal Sport City Stadium, Jizan

== Statistics ==
=== Top scorers ===
As of 4 March 2018

Rank	Player	Club	Goals
1	(Saudi Arabia) Hossam Al-Shadhli	Hetten	19
2	(Saudi Arabia) Abdullah Al-Khethiri	Al-Suqoor	11
3	(Saudi Arabia) Mohammed Al-Shammari	Al-Hejaz	10
4	(Saudi Arabia) Sami Al-Enezi	Al-Thoqbah	9
4	(Saudi Arabia) Abdullah Al-Mogren	Al-Washm	9
6	(Saudi Arabia) Turki Sufyani	Al-Washm	8
7	(Saudi Arabia) Hussain Al-Khalifah	Al-Adalh	7
7	(Saudi Arabia) Sajer Al-Shammeri	Al-Taqadom	7
7	(Saudi Arabia) Ammar Bilal	Al-Ain	7
7	(Saudi Arabia) Sami Matri	Hetten	7

=== Clean sheets ===
As of 4 March 2018

Rank	Player	Club	Clean sheets
1	(Saudi Arabia) Mohammed Al-Bokhaitan	Al-Jabalain	10
2	(Saudi Arabia) Mohammed Al Qassem	Al-Wehda	9
2	(Saudi Arabia) Fayez Al-Khaibari	Al-Ansar	9
4	(Saudi Arabia) Hamzah Al-Khalaf	Al-Washm	8
5	(Saudi Arabia) Saad Al-Saleh	Al-Muzahimiyyah	7

== See also ==
- 2017–18 Professional League
- 2017–18 Prince Mohammad bin Salman League
- 2018 King Cup
- 2017–18 Crown Prince Cup
