= 2015–16 Saudi Second Division =

Saudi Second Division
- Season: 2015–16
- Champions: Al-Qaisumah (1st title)
- Promoted: Al-Qaisumah; Al-Adalh; Wej
- Relegated: Al-Oyoon; Al-Akhdoud; Al-Tuhami; Al-Qala
- Matches: 184
- Goals: 500 (2.72 per match)

The 2015–16 Saudi Second Division was the 20th season of the Saudi Second Division since its establishment in 1996.

The season featured 13 teams from the 2014–15 campaign, three new teams relegated from the 2014–15 First Division League: Al-Safa, Abha and Hetten, and four new teams promoted from the 2014–15 Saudi Third Division: Al Jabalain as champion and group A winner, Al-Qaisumah as runner-up and group B winner, Al-Washm as group B runner-up and Al-Qala as group A runner-up. The league began on 8 October 2015 and ended on 27 February 2016.

Al-Qaisumah won the league title after beating Al-Adalh 2–1 on aggregate in the final, both teams promoted to the 2016–17 Saudi First Division, also Wej promoted after defeating Al-Badaya 1–0 on aggregate in the third place play-off. While Al-Oyoon, Al-Akhdoud, Al-Tuhami and Al-Qala were relegated.

== Teams ==
Teams relegated from the 2014–15 Saudi First Division

- Al-Safa
- Abha
- Hetten

Teams promoted from the 2014–15 Saudi Third Division

- Al Jabalain
- Al-Qaisumah
- Al-Washm
- Al-Qala

;Group A

Locations of teams in the 2015–16 Saudi Second Division Group A

Club	Location	Stadium
Al-Adalh	Al-Hasa	Department for Education Stadium
Al Jabalain	Ha'il	Prince Abdul Aziz bin Musa'ed Stadium
Al-Najma	Unaizah	Al-Najma Club Stadium
Al-Oyoon	Al-Oyoon	Prince Abdullah bin Jalawi Stadium (Al-Hasa)
Al-Safa	Safwa	Al-Safa Club Stadium
Al-Taraji	Qatif	Prince Nayef bin Abdulaziz Stadium
Al-Tuhami	Jizan	King Faisal Sport City Stadium
Al-Washm	Shaqra	Al-Washm Club Stadium
Hetten	Samtah	King Faisal Sport City Stadium (Jizan)
Wej	Ta'if	King Fahd Stadium

Group B

Locations of teams in the 2015–16 Saudi Second Division Group B

Club	Location	Stadium
Abha	Abha	Prince Sultan bin Abdul Aziz Stadium
Al-Akhdoud	Najran	Al Akhdoud Club Stadium
Al-Ansar	Medina	Prince Mohammed bin Abdul Aziz Stadium
Al-Badaya	Al-Badaya	Al-Amal Club Stadium (Al-Bukairiyah)
Al-Kawkb	Al-Kharj	Al-Shoalah Club Stadium
Al-Muzahimiyyah	Al-Muzahmiyya	Leadership Development Institute Stadium (Riyadh)
Al-Qaisumah	Qaisumah	Al-Qaisumah Club Stadium
Al-Qala	Sakakah	Al-Oruba Club Stadium
Al-Sharq	Dilam	Al-Shoalah Club Stadium (Al-Kharj)
Sdoos	Diriyah	Leadership Development Institute Stadium (Riyadh)

== Group A ==
Table

Pos	Team	Pld	W	D	L	GF	GA	GD	Pts	Promotion, qualification or relegation
1	Al-Adalh (P)	18	13	3	2	38	12	+26	42	Promotion to 1st Division League and Qualification to the Final
2	Wej (O, P)	18	10	4	4	39	24	+15	34	Qualification to play-offs
3	Al Jabalain	18	7	8	3	29	16	+13	29	
4	Hetten	18	6	8	4	21	21	0	26	
5	Al-Washm	18	6	7	5	26	21	+5	25	
6	Al-Taraji	18	6	5	7	24	21	+3	23	
7	Al-Najma	18	6	5	7	27	33	−6	23	
8	Al-Safa	18	6	5	7	19	19	0	23	
9	Al-Oyoon (R)	18	3	3	12	27	54	−27	12	Relegation to 2016–17 3rd Division League
10	Al-Tuhami (R)	18	2	2	14	11	40	−29	8	Relegation to 2016–17 3rd Division League

Source: Goalzz
Rules for classification: 1) Points; 2) Head-to-Head points; 3) Head-to-Head goal difference; 4) Head-to-Head goal scored; 5) Total goal difference; 6) Total goals scored; 7) Play-off (only for deciding champion, promotion and relegation).
(O) Play-off winners; (P) Promoted; (R) Relegated

Results

Home \ Away	ADA	JAB	NJM	OYO	SAF	TAR	TUH	WAS	HET	WEJ
Al-Adalh		2–0	4–1	1–0	2–0	1–2	3–0	1–1	2–0	2–2
Al Jabalain	0–1		1–1	4–0	1–1	3–1	5–0	0–0	1–1	3–0
Al-Najma	1–0	2–2		5–2	1–0	2–1	1–2	2–1	2–2	1–3
Al-Oyoon	0–4	2–4	5–3		2–2	1–0	2–2	0–4	2–2	3–5
Al-Safa	0–2	0–0	1–0	3–2		0–0	4–0	3–0	1–2	1–0
Al-Taraji	3–3	1–2	2–0	5–0	2–0		1–0	1–1	1–1	2–2
Al-Tuhami	1–2	0–0	2–4	0–1	1–2	0–1		0–3	0–3	1–2
Al-Washm	1–2	2–2	1–1	2–1	2–0	2–1	0–1		1–1	3–2
Hetten	0–4	0–1	0–0	3–2	0–0	2–0	1–0	2–1		1–1
Wej	0–2	2–0	4–0	5–2	2–1	1–0	5–1	1–1	2–0	

Updated to match(es) played on 12 February 2016. Source: SAFF (in Arabic), Goalzz
Legend: Blue = home team win; Yellow = draw; Red = away team win.

== Group B ==
Table

Pos	Team	Pld	W	D	L	GF	GA	GD	Pts	Promotion, qualification or relegation
1	Al-Qaisumah (C, P)	18	11	7	0	36	18	+18	40	Promotion to 1st Division League and Qualification to the Final
2	Al-Badaya	18	7	10	1	25	13	+12	31	Qualification to play-offs
3	Al-Muzahimiyyah	18	7	8	3	24	20	+4	29	
4	Sdoos	18	8	4	6	30	23	+7	28	
5	Al-Kawkb	18	7	6	5	25	21	+4	27	
6	Al-Sharq	18	7	4	7	24	24	0	25	
7	Abha	18	4	8	6	19	24	−5	20	
8	Al-Ansar	18	5	4	9	25	27	−2	19	
9	Al-Akhdoud (R)	18	5	2	11	17	26	−9	17	Relegation to 2016–17 3rd Division League
10	Al-Qala (R)	18	2	1	15	10	39	−29	7	Relegation to 2016–17 3rd Division League

Source: Goalzz
Rules for classification: 1) Points; 2) Head-to-Head points; 3) Head-to-Head goal difference; 4) Head-to-Head goal scored; 5) Total goal difference; 6) Total goals scored; 7) Play-off (only for deciding champion, promotion and relegation).
(C) Champions; (P) Promoted; (R) Relegated

Results

Home \ Away	ABH	AKH	ANS	BAD	KAW	MUZ	QAI	QLA	SHA	SDO
Abha		1–0	2–1	0–0	3–3	1–1	0–0	2–0	0–0	4–3
Al-Akhdoud	4–1		1–0	0–3	0–0	0–1	0–3	3–0	1–2	0–2
Al-Ansar	1–0	2–0		1–1	0–2	1–1	3–4	3–1	1–2	0–2
Al-Badaya	3–1	0–0	2–2		1–0	1–1	2–2	0–1	2–1	2–1
Al-Kawkb	3–1	4–2	1–0	1–1		2–0	0–1	2–0	1–0	1–1
Al-Muzahimiyyah	1–1	1–0	4–2	0–0	3–1		1–3	1–0	2–0	1–1
Al-Qaisumah	0–0	2–1	2–2	0–0	1–1	4–1		3–2	3–0	2–1
Al-Qala	1–0	0–1	1–5	0–4	2–2	0–2	1–2		1–2	0–2
Al-Sharq	2–2	2–3	0–1	0–1	2–0	1–1	2–2	3–0		3–2
Sdoos	1–0	2–1	1–0	2–2	3–1	2–2	1–2	2–0	1–2	

Updated to match(es) played on 13 February 2016. Source: SAFF (in Arabic), Goalzz
Legend: Blue = home team win; Yellow = draw; Red = away team win.

== Third place play-off ==
Al-Badaya, who finished 2nd in group B faced Wej the 2nd of group A for a two-legged play-off to decide the third promotion team with Al-Adalh and Al-Qaisumah. Wej won 1–0 on aggregate and were promoted to the 2016–17 Saudi First Division.

Team 1	Agg.	Team 2	1st leg	2nd leg
Al-Badaya	0–1	Wej	0–0	0–1

First leg

19 February 2016
18:20 AST
(UTC+3)

Al-Badaya	0–0	Wej
	Report (in Arabic)

Al-Amal Club Stadium, Al-Bukairiyah

Second leg

26 February 2016
20:15 AST
(UTC+3)

Wej	1–0	Al-Badaya
Al-Asmari 55'	Report (in Arabic)

King Fahd Stadium, Ta'if

Wej won 1–0 on aggregate.

== Final ==
The winners of each group played two-legged matches to decide champions of the 2015–16 Saudi Second Division. Al-Qaisumah won 2–1 on aggregate against Al-Adalh.

Team 1	Agg.	Team 2	1st leg	2nd leg
Al-Qaisumah	2–1	Al-Adalh	1–0	1–1

First leg

20 February 2016
15:40 AST
(UTC+3)

Al-Qaisumah	1–0	Al-Adalh
Al-Shaali 50'	Report (in Arabic)

Al-Qaisumah Club Stadium, Qaisumah

Second leg

27 February 2016
18:20 AST
(UTC+3)

Al-Adalh	1–1	Al-Qaisumah
Al-Khamis 63' (pen.)	Report (in Arabic)	Al-Shaali 58'

Prince Abdullah bin Jalawi Stadium, Al-Hasa

Al-Qaisumah won 2–1 on aggregate.

Champions

Saudi Second Division
2015–16 winners
Al-Qaisumah
1st title

== See also ==
- 2015–16 Professional League
- 2015–16 1st Division League
- 2016 King Cup
- 2015–16 Crown Prince Cup
- 2015 Super Cup
