= Fahad Al-Swailem =

Saudi Arabian footballer

Personal information
- Full name: Fahad Hussain Al-Swailem
- Date of birth: 9 June 1992 (age 34)
- Place of birth: Al-Kharj, Saudi Arabia
- Positions: Winger; defender

Team information
- Current team: Al-Ghottah
- Number: 16

Youth career
- 2007–2014: Al-Nassr

Senior career*
Years	Team	Apps	(Gls)
2014–2017	Al-Khaleej	29	(0)
2017–2018	Al-Shoulla	4	(0)
2018–2019	Al-Ansar		
2019–2020	Hetten		
2020–2021	Al-Washm		
2021–2022	Al-Sharq		
2022–2023	Al-Jeel		
2023–2024	Al-Washm		
2024–2025	Al-Sadd		
2025–	Al-Ghottah		
- * Club domestic league appearances and goals

Fahad Hussain Al-Swailem (Arabic: فهد السويلم; born 9 June 1992) is a Saudi footballer who plays as a winger or defender for Saudi Arabian club Al-Ghottah.
