= Musharraf Al-Ruwaili =

Saudi Arabian footballer

Personal information
- Full name: Musharraf Rafan Al-Ruwaili
- Date of birth: October 10, 1985 (age 41)
- Place of birth: Saudi Arabia
- Height: 1.71 m (5 ft 7 1/2 in)
- Position: Midfielder

Team information
- Current team: Arar

Senior career*
Years	Team	Apps	(Gls)
2006–2011	Al-Qaisumah		
2011–2017	Al-Orobah		
2017–2019	Al-Jabalain		
2019–2020	Al-Orobah		
2020–2021	Al-Lewaa		
2021–2023	Al-Zulfi		
2023–2024	Tuwaiq		
2024–2025	Al-Ghottah		
2025	Riyadh City		
2025–	Arar		
- * Club domestic league appearances and goals

Musharraf Al-Ruwaili (Arabic: مشرف الرويلي; born October 10, 1985) is a Saudi football player who plays for Arar as a midfielder.

== Career ==
Al-Ruwaili began his career at Al-Qaisumah.

In August 2011, Al-Ruwaili joined Al-Orobah with whom he earned promotion to the Pro League in 2013.

On 18 September 2017, Al-Ruwaili joined Al-Jabalain.

On 1 September 2019, Al-Ruwaili rejoined Al-Orobah.

On 1 October 2020, Al-Ruwaili joined Al-Lewaa.

On 2 September 2021, Al-Ruwaili joined Al-Zulfi.

On 9 January 2023, Al-Ruwaili joined Tuwaiq.

On 1 October 2025, Al-Ruwaili joined Arar.
