= Meftah Al Hamsal =

Saudi Arabian footballer (born 1994)

Personal information
- Full name: Meftah Mobarak Al Hamsal
- Date of birth: February 28, 1994 (age 32)
- Place of birth: Saudi Arabia
- Position: Midfielder

Senior career*
Years	Team	Apps	(Gls)
2015–2018	Najran	33	(1)
2019–2020	Al-Mujazzal	6	(1)
2020	Al-Nahda		
2020–2021	Al-Sahel	2	(0)
2022–2023	Tuwaiq		
2023	Najran		
2023–2024	Al-Nahda		
- * Club domestic league appearances and goals

Meftah Al Hamsal (Arabic: مفتاح آل حمسل; born February 28, 1994) is a Saudi Arabian professional footballer who plays as a midfielder.
