= Turki Sufyani =

Saudi Arabian footballer

Personal information
- Full name: Turki Mohammed Sufyani
- Date of birth: February 22, 1992 (age 34)
- Place of birth: Riyadh, Saudi Arabia
- Height: 1.74 m (5 ft 8 1/2 in)
- Position: Forward

Team information
- Current team: Al-Hareq

Youth career
- 2008–2014: Al-Nassr

Senior career*
Years	Team	Apps	(Gls)
2014–2015	Al-Nassr	0	(0)
2014–2015	→ Al-Orobah (loan)	10	(0)
2015–2017	Al-Ettifaq	1	(0)
2017	→ Al-Nahda (loan)		
2017–2019	Al-Washm		
2019	Al-Qadsiah	0	(0)
2019–2020	Al-Thoqbah	26	(12)
2020–2021	Al-Khaleej	6	(1)
2021–2022	Al-Sahel	9	(1)
2022	Al-Riyadh		
2022–2023	Al-Ain		
2025–	Al-Hareq		
- * Club domestic league appearances and goals

Turki Sufyani (Arabic: تركي سفياني) is a football player who plays as a forward for Al-Hareq in Saudi Arabia.
