= Salim Al-Khebari =

Saudi Arabian footballer

Salem Al-Khaibari
Personal information
- Full name: Salem Hamza Al-Khaibari
- Date of birth: August 6, 1991 (age 35)
- Place of birth: Saudi Arabia
- Position: Striker

Team information
- Current team: Al-Houra
- Number: 19

Youth career
- Al-Ahli

Senior career*
Years	Team	Apps	(Gls)
2012–2018	Al-Faisaly	31	(4)
2017–2018	→ Al-Orobah (loan)	25	(5)
2019–2022	Al-Kholood		
2022–2023	Al-Diriyah		
2023–2024	Al-Nojoom		
2024–2025	Tuwaiq		
2025–	Al-Houra		
- * Club domestic league appearances and goals

Salem Al-Khaibari (Arabic: سالم الخيبري; born 6 August 1991) is a Saudi Arabian football player who currently plays as a forward for Al-Houra.

== Career ==
On 8 September 2023, Al-Khaibari joined Al-Nojoom.

On 17 July 2024, Al-Khaibari joined Tuwaiq.
