= Majed Al-Jaaferi =

Saudi Arabian footballer

Personal information
- Full name: Majed Al-Jaaferi
- Date of birth: February 25, 1986 (age 40)
- Place of birth: Saudi Arabia
- Height: 1.85 m (6 ft 1 in)
- Position: Midfielder

Youth career
- Al-Hamadah

Senior career*
Years	Team	Apps	(Gls)
2006–2010	Al-Hamadah		
2010–2015	Najran	82	(0)
2015–2016	Al-Washm		
2016–2017	Najran		
- * Club domestic league appearances and goals

Majed Al-Jaaferi (Arabic: ماجد الجعفري; born 25 February 1986) is a Saudi football player who played in the Pro League for Najran.
