= Issa Al Abbas =

Saudi Arabian footballer

Personal information
- Full name: Issa Al Abbas
- Date of birth: 17 September 1982 (age 44)
- Place of birth: Qatif, Saudi Arabia
- Position: Right back

Youth career
- Al-Khaleej

Senior career*
Years	Team	Apps	(Gls)
2004–2016	Al-Khaleej		
2016–2018	Al-Taraji		
- * Club domestic league appearances and goals

Issa Al Abbas (Arabic: عيسى آل عباس; born 17 September 1982) is a football player .
