= Riyadh Al-Arini =

Saudi Arabian footballer

Personal information
- Full name: Riyadh Al-Arini
- Date of birth: August 11, 1989 (age 37)
- Place of birth: Saudi Arabia
- Position: Midfielder

Youth career
- Al-Hazm

Senior career*
Years	Team	Apps	(Gls)
2008–2014	Al-Hazm		
2014–2015	Al-Batin		
2015–2016	Al Jeel		
2016–2017	Al-Kholood		
- * Club domestic league appearances and goals

Riyadh Al-Arini (Arabic:رياض العريني; born 11 August 1989) is a Saudi football (soccer) player who plays as a midfielder. He played in the Pro League for Al-Hazm.
