= Ayouni =

Ayouni is a Tunisian surname. Notable people with the surname include:

- Abdessalem Ayouni (born 1994), Tunisian middle-distance runner
- Haythem Ayouni (born 1991), Tunisian footballer
