= Mutab Al-Najrani =

Saudi Arabian footballer

Personal information
- Full name: Mutab Salem Al-Najrani
- Date of birth: February 23, 1991 (age 35)
- Place of birth: Saudi Arabia
- Height: 1.77 m (5 ft 9 1/2 in)
- Position: Forward

Team information
- Current team: Al-Lewaa
- Number: 11

Youth career
- Najran

Senior career*
Years	Team	Apps	(Gls)
2010–2014	Najran	43	(4)
2014–2017	Al-Qadsiah	31	(12)
2017–2018	Al-Khaleej	24	(10)
2018–2019	Al-Fayha	0	(0)
2018–2019	→ Al-Kawkab (loan)		
2019–2020	Al-Khaleej	22	(1)
2021–2022	Al-Ansar		
2022	Al-Okhdood	15	(2)
2022–2023	Al-Washm		
2023–2024	Qilwah		
2024–2025	Al-Hedayah		
2025–	Al-Lewaa		
- * Club domestic league appearances and goals

Mutab Al-Najrani (Arabic: متعب النجراني, born 23 February 1991) is a Saudi Arabian football player who plays for Al-Lewaa as a forward.
