= Mourad Zahou =

Tunisian footballer

Personal information
- Date of birth: 26 October 1989 (age 37)
- Place of birth: Gafsa, Tunisia
- Position: Defender

Team information
- Current team: Al-Watan

Senior career*
Years	Team	Apps	(Gls)
2009–2010	EGS Gafsa		
2013–2015	ES Metlaoui	53	(0)
2015–2017	US Ben Guerdane	47	(0)
2017–2018	ES Metlaoui	12	(0)
2018–2020	Stade Gabèsien		
2020–2021	CS Hammam-Lif		
2021–2022	Olympic Azzaweya		
2022–2024	Abu Salim		
2024–2025	Tuwaiq		
2025–	Al-Watan		
- * Club domestic league appearances and goals

Mourad Zahou (born 26 October 1989) is a Tunisian football defender who currently plays for Al-Watan.

On 10 July 2024, Zahou joined Saudi club Tuwaiq.
