= Ali Al-Shoalah =

Saudi Arabian footballer

Personal information
- Full name: Ali Taher Al-Shoalah
- Date of birth: October 29, 1988 (age 38)
- Place of birth: Saudi Arabia
- Height: 1.86 m (6 ft 1 in)
- Position: Winger

Team information
- Current team: Al-Taraji
- Number: 11

Youth career
- Al-Taraji

Senior career*
| Years | Team | Apps | (Gls) |
| 2008–2015 | Al-Khaleej | | |
| 2015–2017 | Al-Faisaly | 12 | (0) |
| 2017–2022 | Al-Khaleej | 93 | (12) |
| 2022– | Al-Taraji | | |
- * Club domestic league appearances and goals

Ali Al-Shoalah (Arabic: علي الشعلة; born 29 October 1988) is a Saudi football player. He currently plays for Al-Taraji as a winger.

== Honours ==
Al-Khaleej

- First Division: 2021–22, runner-up 2013–14
