= Khaled Al-Shamrani =

Saudi association football player

Personal information
- Full name: Khaled Mohammed Al-Shamrani
- Date of birth: 4 May 1996 (age 30)
- Place of birth: Saudi Arabia
- Position: Defender

Team information
- Current team: Al-Houra
- Number: 23

Senior career*
Years	Team	Apps	(Gls)
2017–2019	Ras Tanura		
2019–2020	Hajer	16	(1)
2020–2021	Al-Nojoom	29	(0)
2021–2022	Najran	17	(2)
2022–2023	Al-Qaisumah	17	(1)
2023–2024	Al-Safa		
2025–	Al-Houra		
- * Club domestic league appearances and goals

Khaled Al-Shamrani (Arabic: خالد الشمراني; born 4 May 1995) is a Saudi professional footballer who plays for Al-Houra as a defender.

On 26 June 2023, Al-Shamrani joined Al-Safa.
