= Maher Hawsawi =

Saudi Arabian footballer

Personal information
- Full name: Maher Mokhtar Saleh Adam Hawsawi
- Date of birth: November 4, 1992 (age 33)
- Place of birth: Saudi Arabia
- Height: 1.72 m (5 ft 8 in)
- Position: Forward

Team information
- Current team: Al-Safa
- Number: 77

Youth career
- –2012: Al-Hilal

Senior career*
Years	Team	Apps	(Gls)
2012–2016	Al-Raed	17	(2)
2015	→ Al-Tai (loan)		
2015–2016	→ Al-Shoulla (loan)	4	(0)
2016–2022	Al-Diriyah		
2022–2023	Al-Orobah	29	(1)
2023–2024	Al-Diriyah		
2024–2025	Al-Kawkab		
2025	Al-Jeel		
2025–	Al-Safa		
- * Club domestic league appearances and goals

Maher Hawsawi (born 4 November 1992) is a Saudi football player who plays as a striker for Al-Safa.

== Career ==
On 10 July 2023, Hawsawi joined Al-Diriyah.

On 28 January 2025, Hawsawi joined Al-Jeel.

On 4 October 2025, Hawsawi joined Al-Safa.
