= Taif University =

University in Taif, Saudi Arabia

- جامعـــة الطائـــف
- Type: Public university
- Established: 2004; 22 years ago
- President: Yousef asiri
- Vice-president: Khalid alsawat
- Location: Al Hawiyah, Ta'if, Makkah, Saudi Arabia; 21°25′58″N 40°29′38″E
- Colors: Gold
- Website: tu.edu.sa

Taif University is located in Al Hawiyah, Ta'if, Saudi Arabia. It was established in 2004. The university is one of three created by TU. The university is a member of the Association of Arab Universities and offers undergraduate and graduate programs in various fields of study.

== Programs ==
University rankings

Global – Overall
- ARWU World: 201–300 (2023)
- THE World: 501–600 (2024)
- USNWR Global: =1275 (2023)

Taif University offers a wide range of undergraduate and graduate programs, including arts, science, engineering, business, medicine, dentistry, pharmacy, and law. The university has a total of 16 faculties, which include the College of Science, the College of Engineering, the College of Medicine, the College of Dentistry, and the College of Pharmacy.

== See also ==
- List of universities and colleges in Saudi Arabia
