= Wej SC =

Saudi Arabian association football club

- Full name: Wej Sports Club
- Nickname: Fakhar Taif (Pride of Taif)
- Founded: 1976; 50 years ago
- Ground: King Fahd Stadium
- Capacity: 20,000
- President: Hanan Al-Qurashi
- Manager: Yousri bin Kahla
- League: Saudi Second Division
- 2024-25: Saudi Second Division, 7th (Group B)
- Website: https://www.wej-club.com/
Home colours	Away colours

Wej Sports Club (Arabic: نادي وج الرياضي) is a Saudi Arabian professional football club based in Al Hawiyah, Ta'if, that competes in the Saudi Second Division, third tier of the Saudi Arabian football league system, formed in 1976.

On 26 February 2016, Wej promoted to the Saudi First Division for the first time in their history after beating Al-Badaya 1–0 on aggregate in the play-off of Saudi Second Division. They, however, were subsequently relegated back to the third tier the following season.

== Current squad ==
As of 27 January 2024:

Note: Flags indicate national team as defined under FIFA eligibility rules; some limited exceptions apply. Players may hold more than one non-FIFA nationality.

No.	Pos.	Nation	Player
1	GK	KSA	Nahar Al-Yami
3	DF	BRA	Jamerson Neves
7	MF	BRA	Vicente
8	MF	KSA	Majed Al-Deeni
9	FW	NGR	Umar Abba
11	DF	KSA	Saleh Al-Bishi
13	MF	KSA	Mohammed Ben Zain
14	DF	KSA	Talal Hawsawi
15	MF	NGR	Jamil Muhammad
16	MF	KSA	Turki Al-Shammari
17	DF	KSA	Ibrahim Asiri
18	DF	KSA	Ammar Al-Johani
26	FW	NGR	Anas Hassan
27	DF	KSA	Samer Kaabi
46	DF	KSA	Abdulelah Filimban
48	GK	KSA	Abdulrahman S. Al-Ghamdi
49	FW	KSA	Abdulrahman K. Al-Ghamdi
60	MF	KSA	Mohammed Al-Shalwi

No.	Pos.	Nation	Player
72	DF	KSA	Ashraf Al-Shammari
77	DF	KSA	Mohammed Al-Refaie
82	FW	KSA	Abdullah Al-Ghorabi
88	MF	KSA	Abdullah Al-Zahrani
90	DF	KSA	Ali Al-Muwallad
—	DF	KSA	Hussain Al-Khulaif
—	DF	KSA	Abdullah Al-Rubaie
—	DF	YEM	Nader Sahal
—	DF	KSA	Nasser Al-Bishi
—	DF	KSA	Yousif Al Aqeel
—	MF	KSA	Mohammed Al-Safri
—	MF	KSA	Nasser Al-Abdeli
—	MF	KSA	Abdulaziz Al-Johani
—	MF	KSA	Mazen Al-Suwailem
—	MF	KSA	Hassan Al-Qayd
—	MF	BRA	Matheus Henrique
—	FW	ALG	Amin Ghadban
—	FW	KSA	Mishari Al-Qahtani

== Honours ==
- Saudi Second Division
  - Third place (1): 2015–16
- Saudi Third Division
  - Third place (1): 2013–14

== See also ==
- List of football clubs in Saudi Arabia
