= Vinícius Boff =

Brazilian footballer

Personal information
- Full name: Vinícius Gonçalves Boff
- Date of birth: 10 February 1999 (age 27)
- Place of birth: Rondonópolis, Brazil
- Height: 1.73 m (5 ft 8 in)
- Positions: Attacking midfielder; forward

Team information
- Current team: Arar
- Number: 10

Youth career
- União Rondonópolis

Senior career*
Years	Team	Apps	(Gls)
2017–2019	União Rondonópolis	17	(2)
2018	→ Atlético Goianiense (loan)	0	(0)
2019–2021	Alverca B	7	(4)
2020	→ Fabril Barreiro (loan)	4	(0)
2021	→ Fabril Barreiro (loan)	2	(0)
2021–2022	Academia-MT	15	(2)
2022–2024	Cuiabá	16	(1)
2023	→ Pouso Alegre (loan)	13	(2)
2024	→ Al-Sahel (loan)		
2024–2025	Manauara		
2025	Goianésia		
2025–	Arar		
- * Club domestic league appearances and goals as of 14:03, 4 May 2023 (UTC)

Vinícius Gonçalves Boff (born 10 February 1999), known as Vinícius Boff, is a Brazilian footballer who plays as either an attacking midfielder or a forward for Arar.

== Club career ==
Born in Rondonópolis, Mato Grosso, Vinícius Boff made his senior debut with hometown side União Rondonópolis in the 2017 Série D. In 2018, he moved on loan to Atlético Goianiense, but only featured for their under-23 squad.

Back to União for the 2019 season, Vinícius Boff featured sparingly before moving abroad in July, with Portuguese side Alverca. The following January, after only playing for their B-team, he was loaned to Campeonato de Portugal club Fabril Barreiro.

Back to Alverca and their B-team, Vinícius Boff returned to Fabril on loan on 28 January 2021. He subsequently returned to his home country and joined Academia-MT, helping in their promotion from the Campeonato Mato-Grossense Second Division and subsequently renewing his contract until the end of the 2022 Campeonato Mato-Grossense.

On 9 April 2022, Vinícius Boff signed for Série A side Cuiabá, being initially assigned to the under-23 team. On 30 September, after being an important unit in the club's first ever Campeonato Brasileiro de Aspirantes title, he renewed his contract until 2024.

Vinícius Boff made his debut in the top tier of Brazilian football on 27 October 2022, coming on as a late substitute for Marllon in a 1–0 home win over Avaí. After featuring more regularly during the 2023 Campeonato Mato-Grossense, he was loaned to Série C side Pouso Alegre on 28 April 2023.

On 3 January 2024, Boff joined Saudi Second Division side Al-Sahel on loan.

== Career statistics ==
As of 4 May 2023

Club	Season	League			State League		Cup		Continental		Other		Total	
Club	Season	Division	Apps	Goals	Apps	Goals	Apps	Goals	Apps	Goals	Apps	Goals	Apps	Goals
União Rondonópolis	2017	Série D	8	1	—		—		—		—		8	1
União Rondonópolis	2018	Mato-Grossense	—		1	0	—		—		—		1	0
União Rondonópolis	2019	Série D	5	1	3	0	—		—		—		8	1
União Rondonópolis	Total		13	2	4	0	—		—		—		17	2
Alverca B	2019–20	AF Lisboa 2ª Divisão	5	3	—		—		—		—		5	3
Alverca B	2020–21	AF Lisboa 1ª Divisão	2	1	—		—		—		—		2	1
Alverca B	Total		7	4	—		—		—		—		7	4
Fabril Barreiro (loan)	2019–20	Campeonato de Portugal	4	0	—		—		—		—		4	0
Fabril Barreiro (loan)	2020–21	Campeonato de Portugal	2	0	—		—		—		—		2	0
Fabril Barreiro (loan)	Total		6	0	—		—		—		—		6	0
Academia-MT	2021	Mato-Grossense 2ª Divisão	—		5	1	—		—		—		5	1
Academia-MT	2022	Mato-Grossense	—		10	1	—		—		—		10	1
Academia-MT	Total		—		15	2	—		—		—		15	2
Cuiabá	2022	Série A	1	0	—		—		—		2 (Note: One appearance in Copa FMF, one appearance in Copa Verde)	0	3	0
Cuiabá	2023	Série A	0	0	12	1	1	0	—		3 (Note: Appearance(s) in Copa Verde)	0	16	1
Cuiabá	Total		1	0	12	1	1	0	—		5	0	19	1
Pouso Alegre (loan)	2023	Série C	1	0	—		—		—		—		1	0
Career total			28	6	31	3	1	0	0	0	5	0	65	9

== Honours ==
Cuiabá

- Campeonato Mato-Grossense: 2023
- Campeonato Brasileiro de Aspirantes: 2022
