= Ahmed Al-Khodhair =

Saudi Arabian footballer

Personal information
- Full name: Ahmed Khodhair Al-Khodhair
- Date of birth: October 22, 1989 (age 37)
- Place of birth: Saudi Arabia
- Height: 1.73 m (5 ft 8 in)
- Position: Forward

Youth career
- Al-Fateh SC

Senior career*
| Years | Team | Apps | (Gls) |
| 2009–2013 | Al-Qadisiyah | | |
| 2013–2014 | Al-Taraji | | |
| 2014–2015 | Al-Nahda | | |
| 2015–2016 | Al-Diriyah | | |
| 2016–2017 | Al-Nojoom FC | | |
- * Club domestic league appearances and goals

Ahmed Al-Khodhair (Arabic: أحمد الخضير; born October 22, 1989) is a Saudi football player who plays as a forward. He appeared in the Pro League for Al-Qadisiyah.
