= 2009–10 Saudi Second Division =

Saudi Second Division
- Season: 2009–10
- Champions: Al-Najma (2nd title)
- Promoted: Al-Najma; Al-Jeel; Jeddah; Al-Orobah
- Relegated: None

The 2009–10 Saudi Second Division was the 34th season of the Saudi Second Division since its establishment in 1976, serving as the third tier of football competition in Saudi Arabia. The season featured clubs competing for promotion to the Saudi First Division, with the top three teams earning qualification. Relegation was canceled this season as part of a restructuring plan that expanded the Second Division to 20 clubs.

== League table ==
Pos	Team	Pld	W	D	L	GF	GA	GD	Pts	Promotion
1	Al-Najma	26	16	7	3	53	22	+31	55	Promotion to the Saudi First Division
2	Al-Jeel	26	15	4	7	44	28	+16	49	Promotion to the Saudi First Division
3	Jeddah	26	13	5	8	42	31	+11	44	Promotion to the Saudi First Division
4	Al-Orobah	26	12	7	7	37	37	0	43	Promotion to the Saudi First Division
5	Al-Nahda	26	12	7	7	37	27	+10	43	
6	Al-Jabalain	26	12	5	9	37	29	+8	41	
7	Sdoos	26	12	5	9	35	33	+2	41	
8	Al-Batin	26	9	7	10	36	39	−3	34	
9	Al-Arabi	26	8	6	12	33	39	−6	30	
10	Al-Hamadah	26	8	5	13	30	33	−3	29	
11	Al-Fayha	26	7	8	11	31	42	−11	29	
12	Najd	26	8	4	14	23	46	−23	28	
13	Al-Okhdood	26	6	9	11	29	33	−4	27	
14	Diriyah	26	3	3	20	18	46	−28	12	

== Promotion play-offs ==
Al-Orobah earned promotion to the Saudi First Division after winning a two-legged play-off against Al-Nahda, as both teams finished the season with equal points.

Team 1	Agg.	Team 2	1st leg	2nd leg
Al-Nahda	3–5	Al-Orobah	3–2	3–0

=== First leg ===
3 June 2010
20:30 (UTC+3)

Al-Nahda	3–2	Al-Orobah
20' (pen.) Hani Al-Dahi; 28' Mussa Shaqiqi; 42' Hani Al-Dahi	Match report	58' Khalaf Shammari; 90+2' Khaled Al-Harthi

Prince Mohamed bin Fahd Stadium, Dammam
Referee: Marai Al-Awaji (Saudi Arabia)

=== Second leg ===
10 June 2010
21:10 (UTC+3)

Al-Orobah	3–0	Al-Nahda
25' Khalaf Shammari; 62' Khaled Al-Harthi; 90+3' (pen.) Aaref Al-Shammari

Al-Orobah Club Stadium, Sakakah
Referee: Fahad Al-Mirdasi (Saudi Arabia)
