= Al-Houra FC =

Association football club in Saudi Arabia

Al-Houra
- Full name: Al-Houra Football Club
- Founded: 1975; 51 years ago
- Ground: Al-Houra Club Stadium, Umluj
- Capacity: 3,154
- Chairman: Fahad Al-Refaei
- Manager: Mondher Makhlouf
- League: Third Division
- 2024-25: Saudi Second Division, 15th (Group A)
Home colours	Away colours

Al-Houra FC (Arabic: نادي الحوراء) is a Saudi Arabian football club based in Umluj, Tabuk and competes in the Saudi Second Division, the third tier of Saudi football. The club was founded in 1975 and consists of various other departments including table tennis, volleyball, and karate. The club's current president is Fahad Al-Refaei, who was inducted in 2022. The club play their home games at Al-Houra Club Stadium in Umluj which has a capacity of 3,154.

Al-Houra spent the majority of their existence between the Regional Leagues and the Saudi Third Division with the exception of two seasons in the Saudi Second Division. Al-Houra earned their first promotion to the Second Division since 1995 after defeating Al-Ghottah in the promotion play-offs during the 2022–23 season.

== Current squad ==
As of 12 July 2023

Note: Flags indicate national team as defined under FIFA eligibility rules; some limited exceptions apply. Players may hold more than one non-FIFA nationality.

No.	Pos.	Nation	Player
2	DF	KSA	Ibrahim Al-Juraisan
5	DF	KSA	Adel Al-Marwani
6	MF	KSA	Ghaleb Kharmi
7	MF	KSA	Haidar Al-Jizani
8	MF	KSA	Mabrook Mubarak
9	FW	KSA	Yousef Al-Johani
10	MF	KSA	Fares Al-Sayed
11	MF	KSA	Mujtaba Al-Shaqaq
12	MF	KSA	Essam Al-Muwallad
13	DF	KSA	Haron Hashem
18	FW	KSA	Hamza Al-Johani

No.	Pos.	Nation	Player
19	FW	KSA	Salem Al-Khaibari
22	GK	KSA	Rayan Abo Latifa
23	DF	KSA	Khaled Al-Shamrani
24	DF	KSA	Ibrahim Budairi
27	DF	KSA	Majed Hazzazi
29	MF	KSA	Abdullah Al-Hajori
37	MF	KSA	Abdoh Al-Mandeeli
50	GK	KSA	Redha Al Mubarak
80	FW	KSA	Ibrahim Al-Qarni
87	DF	KSA	Fahad Al-Dossari
90	FW	KSA	Faisal Al Abbas
94	MF	KSA	Yazeed Al-Hajori

== See also ==
- List of football clubs in Saudi Arabia
