= Emmanuel Mensah (footballer) =

Ghanaian footballer

Personal information
- Full name: Emmanuel Mensah
- Date of birth: 30 June 1994 (age 32)
- Place of birth: Accra, Ghana
- Height: 1.82 m (6 ft 0 in)
- Position: Forward

Team information
- Current team: Al-Ghottah
- Number: 70

Youth career
- 2013–2014: Honvéd Budapest

Senior career*
Years	Team	Apps	(Gls)
2014	Honvéd Budapest	1	(0)
2014–2015	Bodva Moldava nad Bodvou	25	(7)
2015	Zemplín Michalovce	14	(1)
2016	Frýdek-Místek	2	(0)
2016–2017	Zemplín Michalovce	14	(5)
2017	Laçi	17	(4)
2017–2018	Atromitos	7	(0)
2018	Kerkyra	3	(0)
2018–2019	Partizani Tirana	30	(5)
2019	Zemplín Michalovce	4	(0)
2020–2022	Doxa Drama	23	(2)
2022	Panionios	5	(0)
2022	Paniliakos F.C.		
2023	Flamurtari	5	(0)
2023–2024	Al-Sadd		
2024–2025	Al-Houra		
2025–	Al-Ghottah		
- * Club domestic league appearances and goals as of 19 May 2023

Emmanuel Mensah (born 30 June 1994 in Accra) is a Ghanaian professional footballer who plays as a winger for Saudi club Al-Ghottah.

== Career ==
On 7 August 2023, Mensah joined Saudi Second Division League club Al-Sadd. On 26 September 2024, Mensah joined Al-Houra from the same league. On 22 September 2025, Mensah joined Al-Ghottah from the same league.

== Sources ==
- Emmanuel Mensah at Soccerway (archived)
- MLSZ (in Hungarian)
