= Arar FC =

Saudi Arabian association football team

Arar
- Full name: Arar F.C.
- Founded: 1976; 50 years ago (as Badnah); 2006; 20 years ago (as Arar)
- Ground: Arar, Northern Borders, Saudi Arabia
- Chairman: Ali Al-Suwailem
- Manager: Ryan Northmore
- League: Second Division
- 2024-25: Saudi Second Division 6th of 16th
Home colours	Away colours

Arar F.C. is a Saudi Arabian football team in Arar City playing at the Saudi Second Division.

== Current squads ==
As of Saudi Second Division:

Note: Flags indicate national team as defined under FIFA eligibility rules; some limited exceptions apply. Players may hold more than one non-FIFA nationality.

No.	Pos.	Nation	Player
1	GK	KSA	Ali Al-Sibiyani
5	DF	KSA	Nasser Marzaq
7	MF	KSA	Hamad Matar
9	FW	KSA	Osama Al-Ruwaili
10	MF	BRA	Vinícius Boff
11	MF	KSA	Musharraf Al-Ruwaili
12	DF	KSA	Khaled Al-Enezi
13	DF	KSA	Dhari Al-Hazmi
14	MF	KSA	Fawaz Al-Mutairi
16	FW	KSA	Hatem Al-Hazmi
17	DF	KSA	Salman Al-Enezi
18	MF	KSA	Naif Al-Aliany
20	MF	COD	Heritier Imana
22	GK	KSA	Nasser Al-Mehaini

No.	Pos.	Nation	Player
24	MF	KSA	Yasser Al-Shammari
27	FW	KSA	Omar Al-Jarid
29	MF	MLI	Ousmane Doumbia
30	DF	KSA	Saeed Al-Mutairi
45	MF	KSA	Sultan Al-Enezi
66	GK	KSA	Malek Al-Ruwaili
70	DF	KSA	Yasser Al-Shaalan
77	DF	KSA	Mohammed Al-Enezi
87	DF	KSA	Abdulmohsen Al-Shammari
88	FW	KSA	Ateeq Al-Ateeq
99	DF	KSA	Salman Al-Hazmi
—	DF	KSA	Khalid Al-Dubaysh
—	MF	KSA	Omar Al Saad
—	MF	KSA	Bander Faleh
—	FW	KSA	Sajar Al-Shammeri

== See also ==
- List of football clubs in Saudi Arabia
