= Haythem Ayouni =

Tunisian footballer (born 1991)

Personal information
- Date of birth: 16 May 1991 (age 35)
- Place of birth: Kairouan
- Height: 1.86 m (6 ft 1 in)
- Position: Defender

Team information
- Current team: Al-Jeel
- Number: 98

Senior career*
Years	Team	Apps	(Gls)
2014–2015	EO Sidi Bouzid		
2015–2016	JS Kairouan	24	(1)
2016–2017	Étoile du Sahel	2	(0)
2017–2019	JS Kairouan	26	(0)
2020–2021	Stade Tunisien	26	(2)
2022	Al Masry SC	20	(1)
2023	Al Ahli SC (Tripoli)		
2023–2024	Asswehly SC		
2024–2025	CS Sfaxien	22	(2)
2025–	Al-Jeel		
- * Club domestic league appearances and goals

Haythem Ayouni (born 16 May 1991) is a Tunisian football defender who plays for Saudi club Al-Jeel.

On 8 September 2025, Ayouni joined Saudi SDL club Al-Jeel.
