= Glody Kilangalanga =

Congolese footballer (born 1999)

Personal information
- Full name: Pame Glody Kilangalanga
- Date of birth: 8 August 1999 (age 27)
- Place of birth: DR Congo
- Position: Striker

Team information
- Current team: Al-Washm
- Number: 7

Senior career*
Years	Team	Apps	(Gls)
2018–2020	Maniema Union	-	(-)
2020	CS Chebba	8	(1)
2021	JS Kabylie	0	(0)
2023–2024	Bisha		
2024–2025	Wej		
2025–	Al-Washm		

International career
2016–2018	DR Congo U20	-	(-)
- * Club domestic league appearances and goals as of 00:00, 24 February 2021 (EST)

Pame Glody Kilangalanga (born 8 August 1999) is a Congolese professional footballer who plays as a striker for Saudi Arabian club Al-Washm.

== Club career ==
On January 31, 2021, Kilangalanga signed a one-year contract with Algerian club JS Kabylie.

On 25 July 2023, Kilangalanga joined Saudi Arabian club Bisha. On 18 August 2024, Kilangalanga joined Wej. On 23 September 2025, Kilangalanga joined Al-Washm.
