= Ahmed Al-Turki =

Saudi Arabian footballer

Personal information
- Date of birth: 19 May 1994 (age 32)
- Place of birth: Saudi Arabia
- Height: 1.65 m (5 ft 5 in)
- Position: Winger

Team information
- Current team: Al-Saqer

Youth career
- –2013: Al-Taawoun

Senior career*
Years	Team	Apps	(Gls)
2013–2018	Al-Taawoun	38	(1)
2016–2017	→ Al-Tai (loan)		
2019–2020	Al-Saqer		
- * Club domestic league appearances and goals

Ahmed Al-Turki (Arabic: أحمد التركي; born 19 May 1994) is a Saudi footballer who plays as a winger.
