= Baqaa, Saudi Arabia =

City and Governorate in Hail Province, Saudi Arabia

Baqaa Governorate محافظة بقعاء
- City and Governorate
- Location of Baqaa Governorate within Hail Province

- Location of Baqaa within Saudi Arabia
- Coordinates: 27°54′37″N 42°23′24″E
- Country: Saudi Arabia
- Province: Hail Province
- Region: Najd
- Markaz: 14
- Seat: Baqaa City

Government
  - Type: Municipality
  - Body: Baqaa Municipality
  - Governor: Muhammad bin Mutlaq

Area
  - City and Governorate: 25,000 km^{2} (9,700 sq mi)

Population (2022)
  - Metro: 56,362 (Baqaa Governorate)
- Time zone: UTC+03:00 (SAST)
- Area code: 016

Baqaa (Arabic: بقعاء, romanized: Baqʿāʾ) is a city and governorate in Hail Province, Saudi Arabia.

== Sports ==
Al-Lewaa Club is the main football club representing the Baqaa governorate.

== Population ==
Historical population
Year	Pop.	±% p.a.
2010	40,211	—
2022	56,362	+2.85%

== Governor ==
- Muhammad bin Mutlaq al-Qanun (20 March 2024–present)

== Transportation ==
=== Air ===
The closest airport to Baqaa Governorate is Hail International Airport, which connects the governorate with several cities across Saudi Arabia and a few international destinations. The airport is located approximately 1 hour and 20 minutes away by car.

=== Rail ===
Baqaa is linked to the national railway network through the nearby Hail railway station in Hail City on the Riyadh–Qurayyat railway operated by Saudi Arabia Railways. The line provides regular service between Hail and major cities such as Riyadh, Al-Qassim, Al-Jawf, and Qurayyat.

== See also ==
- Provinces of Saudi Arabia
- List of governorates of Saudi Arabia
- List of cities and towns in Saudi Arabia
