= Al-Badaya Club =

Association football club in Saudi Arabia

Al-Badaya
- Full name: Al-Badaya Club
- Founded: 1965
- Ground: Al-Badaya, Al-Qasim, Saudi Arabia
- Chairman: ?
- Manager: Reza Al-Eisawi
- League: Saudi Fourth Division
- 2017–18: Group A 9th place (relegated)
Home colours	Away colours

Al-Badaya Club is a Saudi Arabian football (soccer) team in Al-Badaya city playing at the Saudi Fourth Division.

Al-Badaya plays its home games at the al-amal-club-stadium in Al-Badaya. With its so-closed built sets, Al-Amal Stadium can hold 3000 fans.

== See also ==
- List of football clubs in Saudi Arabia
