= Al Hawiyah =

- Town
- Location in Saudi Arabia
- Coordinates: 21°26′28″N 40°29′51″E
- Country: Saudi Arabia
- Province: Makkah Province

Population (2022 census)
  - Total: 171,610
- Time zone: UTC+3 (EAT)
  - Summer (DST): UTC+3 (EAT)

Al Hawiyah is a town in Makkah Province, located 15 kilometres (9 1/2 miles) from Ta'if. It was a small suburb in the past. Currently it has expanded to include more than 15 residential neighborhoods, with an area of 80 square kilometres (31 sq mi) and is inhabited with many different classes of Saudi society. Nowadays, Al Hawiyah is considered as an emerging vibrant area with many government facilities. Among other facilities, al-Hawiyya is home to the main campus of Taif University. At the 2022 census, al-Hawiyya had a population of 171,610.

Al Hawiya is about 214 kilometres (133 mi) from Al-Waba Crater.

== Geography ==
Al-Hawiyya is located in the northern part of the Ta'if urban area. Ta'if Governorate lies on a high plateau on the eastern edge of the Hejaz Mountains; its elevation contributes to a more temperate summer climate compared with many lowland regions of Saudi Arabia. The town lies on transport routes connecting Ta'if with Mecca, the northern parts of Makkah Province and the interior of the country.

Since al-Hawiyya is now closely integrated with Ta'if's built-up area, it is often described as the northern part of the city of Ta'if. Administratively, it belongs to Ta'if Governorate, which had 913,374 inhabitants according to the 2022 census.

== History ==
The earlier development of al-Hawiyya is closely linked to the history of Ta'if, which has been one of the important settlements of the Hejaz since pre-Islamic times. Because of its elevation, agricultural surroundings and proximity to Mecca, Ta'if was an important regional centre. In modern times, the city gradually expanded northward and northeastward, turning al-Hawiyya from a small suburb into a larger urban settlement area.

A major impetus for development came from the establishment of state and semi-public institutions. Taif University emerged from older higher-education structures: the Faculty of Education began in 1980 as part of King Abdulaziz University, with 85 male and 180 female students; it was later assigned to Umm al-Qura University and, after the establishment of additional faculties, developed into the independent Taif University.

== Demographics ==
At the 2022 census, al-Hawiyya had a population of 171,610.

Year	Population
1992	93,888
2004	131,939
2010	148,151
2022	171,610

== Education ==
The most important educational institution in al-Hawiyya is Taif University. It comprises 17 colleges, most of which are located on the main campus in al-Hawiyya; additional branches are located in Turabah, al-Khurma and Ranyah. Its range of disciplines includes medicine, dentistry, pharmacy, nursing, engineering, computer science, natural sciences, business and law.

== Sport ==
King Fahd Sports City is located in al-Hawiyya. The complex was opened in 1985, covers around 200,000 square metres and has a stadium with 20,500 seats. It is situated on as-Sail Road and serves as a regional sports complex for football, athletics and other sporting events.

== Aviation ==
The town is home to the civilian Taif International Airport as well as King Fahd Air Base of the Saudi Arabian Armed Forces.

== Landmarks ==
- Palace of King Saud bin Abdulaziz Al Saud, whose buildings were annexed to Ta'if University.
- Palace of King Abdullah bin Abdulaziz Al Saud.
- Palace of Prince Mohammed bin Abdulaziz Al Saud.
- Palace of Prince Badr bin Abdulaziz Al Saud.
- King Fahad Air Base (KFAB).
- King Abdullah Air Defense College.
- Ta'if University.
- Ta'if Regional Airport.
- King Fahd Sport City.
- King Faisal Park
- King Khalid Equestrian Square.
- InterContinental Taif Hotel.
- New National Guard Hospital.
- National Guard Housing.

== See also ==
- List of cities and towns in Saudi Arabia
- Regions of Saudi Arabia
