= Al-Lewaa Club =

Sport club in Saudi Arabia

- Full name: Al-Lewaa Club
- Founded: 1976; 50 years ago
- Ground: Al-Lewaa Club Stadium, Baqaa, Saudi Arabia
- Owner: Ministry of Sport
- League: Saudi Second Division League
- 2024–25: 5th (Group A)
Home colours	Away colours

Al-Lewaa Club (Arabic: نادي اللواء, lit. Banner Club) is a Saudi Arabian professional football club based in Baqaa, in Hail Province, that competes in the Saudi Second Division League, the third tier of the Saudi football league system.

== Current squad ==
As of Saudi Second Division League:

Note: Flags indicate national team as defined under FIFA eligibility rules; some limited exceptions apply. Players may hold more than one non-FIFA nationality.

No.	Pos.	Nation	Player
1	GK	KSA	Saif Al-Sulami
3	DF	KSA	Naif Al-Dossari
4	MF	KSA	Mohammed Krishan
5	DF	KSA	Mohammed Majrashi
6	DF	KSA	Radhi Al-Radhi
7	MF	BRA	Rayllan Bruno
8	MF	KSA	Samer Al-Mohaimeed
9	FW	BRA	Papel
10	MF	BRA	Júninho
11	FW	KSA	Mutab Al-Najrani
12	DF	KSA	Ahmed Al-Zubaidi
13	DF	KSA	Adel Al-Thowaib
14	DF	KSA	Khaled Al-Zubaid
17	DF	KSA	Waseem Nahari

No.	Pos.	Nation	Player
18	MF	KSA	Hamoud Al-Nofal
19	FW	KSA	Khalid Al-Muntashiri
23	DF	KSA	Mahdi Al-Bishi
32	MF	KSA	Abdullah Al-Dossari
37	GK	KSA	Naif Al-Hussaini
77	FW	KSA	Abdulaziz Al-Mutair
93	MF	KSA	Hatem Al-Anazi
95	MF	KSA	Zubaid Al-Zubaid
—	GK	KSA	Ahmed Al-Awwad
—	GK	KSA	Alaa Al-Raddadi
—	MF	KSA	Mohammed Al-Waked
—	MF	KSA	Abdulaziz Hashem
—	FW	KSA	Mubarak Al-Zubaid

== See also ==
- List of football clubs in Saudi Arabia
