= Mounir Ait L'Hadi =

Algerian footballer (born 1994)

Personal information
- Full name: Mounir Ait L'Hadi
- Date of birth: August 18, 1994 (age 32)
- Place of birth: Kouba, Algeria
- Height: 1.76 m (5 ft 9 in)
- Position: Defensive midfielder

Youth career
- –2015: NA Hussein Dey

Senior career*
Years	Team	Apps	(Gls)
2015–2016	CRB Dar Beida		
2016–2017	SK Benešov		
2017–2019	Jil Saad Haï Djebel		
2019–2023	NA Hussein Dey		
2023	RC Kouba		
2023–2024	Libyan Stadium		
2024	Al-Qairawan		
2024–2025	Al-Salt	21	(0)
2025–2026	Al-Ain		

International career
2011	Algeria U17	1	(0)
2012	Algeria U18	2	(0)
- * Club domestic league appearances and goals as of 1 May 2025

Mounir Ait L'Hadi (Arabic: منير ايت الهادي; born August 25, 1994) is an Algerian footballer who plays as a midfielder.

== Club career ==
=== NA Hussein Dey ===
Ait L'Hadi played with former Algerian Ligue Professionnelle 1 side NA Hussein Dey until 23 July 2023.

=== Al-Qairawan ===
On 2 December 2023, Ait L'Hadi joined Libyan side Al-Qairawan, after his successful stint at Libyan Stadium the previous season.

=== Al-Salt ===
On 30 July 2024, L'Hadi joined Jordanian Pro League club Al-Salt.

=== Al-Ain ===
On 2 October 2025, L'Hadi joined Saudi Second Division League club Al-Ain.

== Honours ==
=== Club ===
NA Hussein Dey

- Algerian U21 Cup (1): 2014

Al-Salt SC

- Jordan Shield Cup: 2024
