= Al-Gottah FC =

Association football club in Saudi Arabia

Al-Gottah
- Full name: Al-Gottah FC
- Founded: 1967; 59 years ago
- Ground: Mawqaq, Ha'il
- Chairman: Saqer Al-Ghalib
- Manager: Hisham Abdul-Munam
- League: Saudi Second Division
- 2024-25: Saudi Second Division, 9th (Group A)
Home colours	Away colours

Al-Gottah FC (Arabic: نادي الغوطة) is a Saudi Arabian football club based in Mawqaq, Ha'il and competes in the Saudi Second Division, the third tier of Saudi football. The club was founded in 1967 and its first president was Matar Al-Futaiman. The club's current president is Saqer Al-Ghalib.

== History ==
Al-Gottah spent the majority of their history between the Saudi Regional Leagues and the Saudi Third Division. In 1978–79, Al-Gottah made their first appearance in the Saudi Second Division League, as winners of the Ha'il Regional League. They once again won the Ha'il Regional League in 1982, 1983, 1987, and 1988. In 2005, Al-Gottah made their return to the Second Division after an absence of 17 years. They were relegated after three consecutive years in the Second Division. In 2024, Al-Gottah once again earned promotion to the Second Division after finishing joint third in the 2023–24 Saudi Third Division. They returned after an absence of 16 years.

== Current squad ==
Note: Flags indicate national team as defined under FIFA eligibility rules; some limited exceptions apply. Players may hold more than one non-FIFA nationality.

No.	Pos.	Nation	Player
1	GK	KSA	Raed Kaabi
4	DF	KSA	Talal Al-Shammari
5	DF	KSA	Ibrahim Rabeh
6	MF	KSA	Hamoud Al-Shammari
7	FW	KSA	Mashari Al-Enezi
8	MF	KSA	Saud Al-Shammari
9	FW	KSA	Rakhi Al-Shammeri
11	DF	KSA	Raed Al-Rashidi
12	DF	KSA	Fares Al-Sowaidi
14	MF	KSA	Mohammed Ayyad
15	DF	TUN	Omar Lamti
16	DF	KSA	Fahad Al-Swailem
17	DF	KSA	Ali Al-Haiti

No.	Pos.	Nation	Player
18	MF	KSA	Sultan Al-Shammari
19	DF	KSA	Khaled Al-Enezi
24	DF	KSA	Abdulaziz Al-Johani
25	MF	BEN	Salim Fadil Bawa
29	DF	KSA	Fuhaid Al-Otaibi
33	GK	KSA	Ibrahim Sharahili
70	FW	GHA	Emmanuel Mensah
77	MF	KSA	Saeed Al-Saeed
99	GK	KSA	Mohsen Al-Blwi
—	GK	KSA	Ayman Al-Lowaish
—	DF	KSA	Abdulaziz Al-Dhabaan
—	MF	KSA	Khallaf Al-Shammari

== See also ==
- List of football clubs in Saudi Arabia
