= Al-Sahel SC (Saudi Arabia) =

Association football club in Saudi Arabia

Al-Sahel
- Full name: Al-Sahel Club
- Founded: 1978; 48 years ago
- Ground: Prince Nayef Sports City Stadium; Qatif, Saudi Arabia
- Capacity: 12,000
- Owner: Ministry of Sport
- Chairman: Jamal Al-Khaldi
- Manager: Mohamed Saidi
- League: Saudi Second Division League
- 2024-25: Second Division, 10th of 18 Group A
Home colours	Away colours

Al-Sahel Club (Arabic: نادي الساحل, lit. Coast Club) is a Saudi Arabian professional football club based in Anak, Qatif, in the Eastern Province of Saudi Arabia. The club competes in the Saudi Second Division League, the third tier of the Saudi football league system.

== Current squad ==
As of Saudi Second Division :

Note: Flags indicate national team as defined under FIFA eligibility rules; some limited exceptions apply. Players may hold more than one non-FIFA nationality.

No.	Pos.	Nation	Player
4	DF	KSA	Sami Al-Khaibari
5	DF	KSA	Hussain Al-Mosaabi
7	MF	KSA	Ibrahim Al-Attas
8	MF	KSA	Abdullah Al-Sohaimi
9	FW	CMR	Roche Foning
10	MF	KSA	Adel Hazazi
11	MF	KSA	Mojahed Seddiq
13	DF	KSA	Maitham Al-Damastani
14	FW	GHA	Joseph Akomadi
15	MF	KSA	Mohammed Al-Mahashir
16	FW	KSA	Mahmoud Albuhassan
17	DF	KSA	Ibrahim Boussaid
18	GK	KSA	Hamad Hawsawi
19	DF	KSA	Nasser Assiri
20	FW	KSA	Ahmed Al-Khaibari

No.	Pos.	Nation	Player
21	MF	KSA	Salman Melfi
24	MF	KSA	Abdulaziz Ghazwani
25	DF	KSA	Sahal Al-Haidari
27	DF	KSA	Salah Al-Banali
28	FW	COD	Charlaire Ebole
33	GK	KSA	Najeeb Al-Hassan
38	DF	KSA	Sultan Al-Sulayli
46	DF	KSA	Abdulhafeez Miajan
47	DF	KSA	Mohammed Al-Dossari
55	MF	KSA	Abdulmajeed Haddadi
77	MF	KSA	Omar Al Saad
79	MF	KSA	Ali Al-Rie
92	GK	KSA	Mohammed Al Qassem
—	DF	KSA	Ahmed Al-Bayyat
—	MF	ALG	Mounir Ait L'Hadi

== See also ==
- List of football clubs in Saudi Arabia
