= King Fahd Sports City Stadium (Taif) =

Sports stadium in Taif, Saudi Arabia

King Fahd Sports City
- Al Hawiyah Stadium
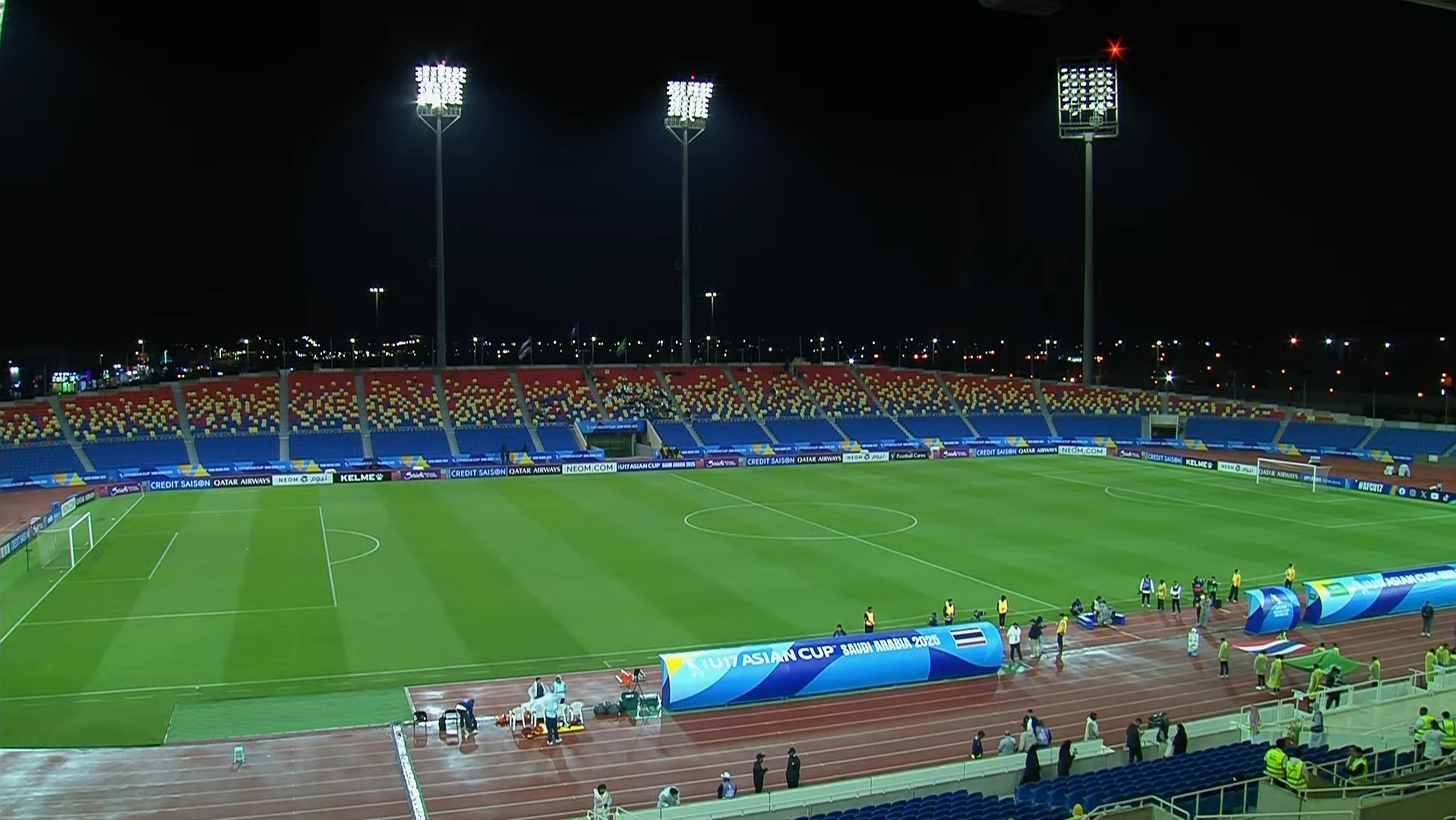
- Interactive map of King Fahd Sports City
- Full name: King Fahd Sports City Stadium
- Address: Al Hawiyah; Saudi Arabia
- Location: Al Hawiyah, Saudi Arabia
- Coordinates: 21.435972°N 40.480371°E
- Owner: Ministry of Sport
- Capacity: 20,000
- Surface: GrassMaster

Construction
- Opened: 1985
- Renovated: 2023

King Fahd Sports City Stadium is a multi-use stadium and sports city located in Al Hawiyah, Saudi Arabia. It hosted some of the 1989 FIFA World Youth Championship, the 2005 Islamic Solidarity Games, and the 2023 Arab Club Champions Cup matches. The capacity of the stadium is 20,000 spectators. The stadium is named after Fahd of Saudi Arabia.

== See also ==
- List of football stadiums in Saudi Arabia
