= Al-Taraji Club =

Association football club in Saudi Arabia

Al-Taraji
- Full name: Al-Taraji Club
- Nickname: Al-Bahara (The Sailors)
- Founded: 1980; 46 years ago
- Ground: Prince Nayef Sports City Stadium; Qatif, Saudi Arabia
- Capacity: 12,000
- Owner: Ministry of Sport
- Chairman: Ali Al-Eid
- Manager: Anis Rebai
- League: Saudi Second Division League
- 2024–25: SDL, 11th of 16 Group A
Home colours	Away colours

Al-Taraji Club (Arabic: نادي الترجي, lit. Hope Club) is a Saudi Arabian professional football and multi-sport club based in Qatif, in the Eastern Province of Saudi Arabia. It competes in the Saudi Second Division League, the third tier of the Saudi football league system.

== History ==
Al-Taraj Club, under its current name, was established in 1980 as a result of the merger of Al-Shate and Al-Badr clubs, the only two clubs in Qatif at the time. The club adopted a logo consisting of the colors blue, red, and yellow, combining the symbols of the two clubs: blue and yellow for Al-Badr, and blue and red for Al-Shate.

The true beginnings date back to the mid-1950s, when the first Qatifi clubs were established, such as Al-Ta'awun, Port Said, Al-Noor, and Al-Nusour. These clubs went through a series of mergers, resulting in Al-Shate and Al-Badr. Therefore, Al-Taraj Club is an extension of the Qatifi clubs founded during that early period and may be considered the oldest club not only in the Qatif Governorate but also in the entire Eastern Province, deserving the title of "Pioneer of Eastern Province Clubs."

Throughout its long history, the club has produced players for national teams in various sports, including: the late Abdulrahman Abdullah Al-Qasab (Shamroukh), Abdul Rab Nabi Al-Zayer, Othman Marzouk, Nizar Abbas, and Hassan Al-Raheb in football; Abdulaziz Abu Saud (a current member of the club's board), Ahmed Al-Ghorab, and Mohammed Al-Zayer in basketball; Faisal Eid, Mohammed Eid, Shawqi Al-Jishi, Nizar Al-Awami, Sayyid Mohsen Al-Ramadan, Ali Baqi, Bassam Al-Khneizi, Moayed Baqi, Mohammed Al-Khater, and Hussein Baqi in volleyball; and Ihsan Al-Jishi, Zaki Al-Ghanem, Mohammed Al-Ghanem, Hussein Akhwan, and Aref Akhwan in handball. It should also be noted that the first Olympic medal won by Saudi Arabia was a bronze medal by Taraj Club's player, Ibrahim Jaafar, in the Taekwondo event at the 1988 Seoul Olympics.

== Current squad ==
As of The Saudi Second Division League:

Note: Flags indicate national team as defined under FIFA eligibility rules; some limited exceptions apply. Players may hold more than one non-FIFA nationality.

No.	Pos.	Nation	Player
1	GK	KSA	Ali Hubail
2	DF	KSA	Mohammed Al Taleb
4	DF	KSA	Rajaie Sahool
5	DF	TUN	Zied Machmoum
6	MF	KSA	Mohammed Al-Muwallad
8	MF	KSA	Hassan Al Zaid
9	FW	BFA	Lamine Ouattara
10	MF	BFA	Clavert Kiendrebeogo
11	FW	KSA	Mashari Al-Juraibi
12	DF	KSA	Salem Al-Hamdan
13	DF	KSA	Abdulaziz Al-Marhabi

No.	Pos.	Nation	Player
14	MF	KSA	Mohammed Shajiri
15	MF	KSA	Majed Al-Najrani
16	GK	KSA	Ali Al-Saihati
17	MF	TUN	Elyes Brini
18	GK	KSA	Yazeed Al-Khaldi
20	FW	KSA	Mohammed Al-Shammari
21	MF	KSA	Malek Al-Darwish
23	DF	KSA	Ahmed Al-Dossari
24	MF	KSA	Azzam Al-Hamdan
26	MF	KSA	Talal Al-Dossari
49	DF	KSA	Abdullah Al Musaed

== See also ==
- List of football clubs in Saudi Arabia

== Notable players ==
- Hassan Al-Raheb
- Ahmed Al-Kassar
- Ali Al-Shoalah
- Mohammed Al-Ghanim
- Dawod Al Saeed
- Moslem Al Freej
- Ahmed Al-Khodhair
- Ahmed Al-Khater
- Abdulrahman Al-Gassab
- Abdulaziz Abualsaud
