= Tuwaiq Club =

Association football club in Saudi Arabia

Tuwaiq
- Full name: Tuwaiq Club
- Founded: 1964; 62 years ago
- Ground: Al-Zulfi Club Stadium, Al Zulfi
- Chairman: Waleed Al-Farhoud
- Manager: Mohamed Maalej
- League: Saudi Second Division
- 2024-25: Saudi Second Division, 14th (Group B)
| Home colours | Away colours |

Tuwaiq Club (Arabic: نادي طويق) is a Saudi Arabian football club based in Al Zulfi and competes in the Saudi Second Division, the third tier of Saudi football. The club was founded in 1964 by Sulaiman Al-Saif and its first president was Ali bin Ahmed Al-Eid. The club is named after the Tuwaiq mountain in Najd. Tuwaiq won their second promotion to the Saudi Second Division during the 2020–21 season after reaching the semi-finals of the Saudi Third Division. They previously played in the first edition of the Second Division in 1976–77. The club also consists of various other departments including karate, weightlifting, futsal, and volleyball.

== Current squad ==
As of 1 August 2025:

Note: Flags indicate national team as defined under FIFA eligibility rules; some limited exceptions apply. Players may hold more than one non-FIFA nationality.

| No. | Pos. | Nation | Player |
|---|---|---|---|
| 1 | GK | KSA | Waleed Al-Ghanem |
| 5 | DF | KSA | Nasser Al-Enezi |
| 6 | DF | KSA | Muhannad Al-Sakran |
| 7 | MF | KSA | Faisal Al-Ghamdi |
| 8 | MF | KSA | Abdullah Al-Hazmi |
| 11 | FW | KSA | Abdulaziz Al-Sakran |
| 12 | DF | KSA | Osama Al-Faham |
| 13 | MF | KSA | Yousef Al-Harbi |
| 17 | FW | KSA | Fawzan Al-Zunaidi |

| No. | Pos. | Nation | Player |
|---|---|---|---|
| 19 | DF | KSA | Musaad Al-Subaie |
| 27 | DF | KSA | Nemer Ghazwani |
| 47 | DF | KSA | Mohammed Al-Dossari |
| 55 | DF | KSA | Saleh Abo Olayan |
| 79 | MF | KSA | Khaled Al-Hubaishi |
| 80 | MF | KSA | Attiyah Al-Shamrani |
| — | FW | KSA | Thamer Al-Ali |

== See also ==
- List of football clubs in Saudi Arabia
