= Al-Jeel Club =

Association football club in Saudi Arabia

Al-Jeel
- Full name: Al-Jeel Club Al-Hasa
- Founded: 1976; 50 years ago
- Ground: Prince Abdullah bin Jalawi Sport City
- Capacity: 19,550
- Chairman: Ahmed Al-Ghunaim
- Head coach: Ahmed Al-Turki
- League: First Division
- 2025-26: Second Division, 1st Group A (lost in the final)
Home colours	Away colours

Al-Jeel Club (Arabic: نادي الجيل) is a Saudi Arabian football club based in Hofuf, Al-Hasa, the club competes in the Saudi First Division League, the second tier of Saudi football.

The club play their home games at Prince Abdullah bin Jalawi Sport City in Al-Ahsa, sharing the stadium with two other city-based clubs, Hajer FC and Al-Adalah FC.

== History ==
Al-Jeel's first president was Saleh Al-Dhafer and its first manager was Sameer Hajjaj. The club was previously known as Al-Okhowa before changing their name to Al-Jeel. Al-Jeel have finished as runners-up in the Saudi Second Division twice, in 1986 and 2010.

== Honours ==
- Saudi Second Division League
  - Runners-up (2): 1985–86, 2009–10

== Current squad ==
Note: Flags indicate national team as defined under FIFA eligibility rules; some limited exceptions apply. Players may hold more than one non-FIFA nationality.

No.	Pos.	Nation	Player
2	DF	KSA	Ibrahim Jaafari
3	DF	BRA	Edilson Júnior
4	DF	KSA	Osama Al-Johar
5	DF	KSA	Abdullah Al-Suwaiei
6	MF	KSA	Saud Zidan (on loan from Al-Riyadh)
8	MF	KSA	Abdulrahman Al-Faleh
10	FW	ALG	Okacha Hamzaoui
11	FW	KSA	Yasser Daribi
14	MF	KSA	Mohammed Al-Fuhaid
15	MF	KSA	Mohammed Al-Duhailan
19	FW	SEN	Ablaye Mbengue
23	MF	BRA	Léo Tilica
25	GK	KSA	Abdullah Al-Saleh

No.	Pos.	Nation	Player
31	GK	KSA	Hussain Al-Tuti
35	GK	KSA	Ibrahim Al-Hafith
42	DF	KSA	Abdullah Al-Oboud
47	MF	KSA	Ali Al-Saqour
55	DF	KSA	Fawaz Al-Hamad (on loan from Al-Fateh)
66	DF	KSA	Ahmed Kaabi (on loan from Al-Qadsiah)
77	FW	KSA	Nawaf Asiri (on loan from Al-Zulfi)
88	MF	KSA	Badr Al-Saad
89	FW	KSA	Ahmed Al-Shuwayfie
90	DF	KSA	Saud Fallatah
97	MF	KSA	Fahad Al-Dossari
—	DF	KSA	Hani Al-Sebyani
—	MF	KSA	Thaar Al-Otaibi

== Coaching staff ==
Position	Staff
Head coach	(Saudi Arabia) Ahmed Al-Turki
Assistant coach	(Saudi Arabia) Majid Al-Turki (Saudi Arabia) Ali Al-Ibrahim
Goalkeeper coach	(Saudi Arabia) Adel Al-Muwaijid
Fitness coach	(Saudi Arabia) Hamza Missaoui
Performance analyst	(Saudi Arabia) Asim Al-Nasibi
Physiotherapists	(Saudi Arabia) Dr. Hamza Bouzra

== Coaches ==
- (Egypt) Bahaa Aldeen Al-Qebisi (2008–2009)
- (Morocco) Idris Obeis (2013–2014)
- (Egypt) Abdullah Darwish (2015–2016)
- (Brazil) Luiz Antônio Zaluar (2022–2023)
- (Tunisia) Saber Abdellaoui (2023–2025)
- (Egypt) Abdullah Darwish (2025–2026)
- (Saudi Arabia) Ahmed Al-Turki (2026–present)

== See also ==
- List of football clubs in Saudi Arabia
