= Al-Washm Club =

Association football club in Saudi Arabia

Al-Washm FC
- Full name: Al-Washm Football Club
- Nicknames: Fakhr Al-Washm (Pride of Al-Washm); Fakhr Al-Shaqra (Pride of Al-Shaqra); Al Burtuqali (The Orange)
- Founded: 1967; 59 years ago
- Ground: Al-Washm Club Stadium, Shaqra
- Capacity: 3,670
- President: Abdulaziz Al-Sulimi
- Head coach: Luiz Antônio Zaluar
- League: Saudi Second Division
- 2025–26: Saudi Second Division, 4th of 16 (Group A)
Home colours	Away colours

Al-Washm Football Club (Arabic: نادي الوشم) is a professional football club based in Shaqra, that plays in the Saudi Second Division League, the third tier of Saudi football. It was founded in 1967.

Al-Washm's colors are white, orange and blue. Al-Washm have won the Saudi Second Division once in the 2017–18 season and won their first promotion to the Prince Mohammad bin Salman League on 18 March 2018.

== Honours ==
- Saudi Second Division League
  - Winners (1): 2017–18

== Current squad ==
As of 5 October 2026

Note: Flags indicate national team as defined under FIFA eligibility rules; some limited exceptions apply. Players may hold more than one non-FIFA nationality.

No.	Pos.	Nation	Player
4	DF	KSA	Abdulrahman Al-Daajani
5	FW	GHA	Sadat Karim
7	FW	COD	Glody Kilangalanga
8	MF	KSA	Fahad Ziyad
10	MF	KSA	Abdulaziz Al-Suwailem
11	MF	KSA	Farid Hussain
14	DF	KSA	Khaled Jahfali
16	DF	KSA	Mohammed Al-Malki
18	MF	KSA	Meshal Al-Medlej
25	MF	KSA	Abdulrahman Al-Alawi
27	DF	KSA	Abdulmalek Mohammed
28	MF	KSA	Hani Al-Bouri
29	MF	KSA	Abdulrahman Al-Sulami
32	GK	KSA	Abdulmalek Al-Judaie

No.	Pos.	Nation	Player
33	GK	KSA	Hamza Jouhary
49	MF	KSA	Rayan Hattan
66	DF	KSA	Abdullah Al-Shaflut
77	MF	BRA	Dedê
79	MF	KSA	Moath Al-Zahrani
80	FW	KSA	Abdullah Mahbub
87	FW	KSA	Abdulelah Al-Qarzai (on loan from Al-Hazem)
88	MF	BRA	André Mensalão
92	MF	KSA	Basil Al-Mehawes
94	DF	BRA	André Penalva
99	FW	KSA	Rakan Al-Dosari
—	GK	KSA	Maher Hakami
—	DF	KSA	Faisal Abdulrazaq
—	MF	KSA	Waleed Asiri

== Stadium ==
The club play their home games at their own stadium, Al-Washm Club Stadium, in Shaqraa.

== Coaching staff ==
Position	Name
Head coach	(Brazil) Luiz Antônio Zaluar
Assistant coach	(Brazil) Nelson Elias (Saudi Arabia) Abdulbadie Al-Ghanem
Goalkeeper coach	(Brazil) Luciano Almeida
Fitness coach	(Brazil) Luis Nascimento
Team Administrator	(Saudi Arabia) Faisal Al-Otaibi
Sports Therapist	(Egypt) Adel Salah
Physiotherapist	(Egypt) Mohamed Hamdy

== See also ==
- List of football clubs in Saudi Arabia
