= 2023–24 Saudi Third Division =

3rd season of the Saudi Third Division

Saudi Third Division
- Season: 2023–24
- Dates: 3 November 2023 – 23 March 2024
- Champions: Al-Ula (1st title)
- Promoted: Al-Ula; Al-Anwar; Al-Sharq; Al-Ghottah
- Relegated: Al-Mujazzal; Al-Tasamoh; Al-Thoqbah; Khaybar
- Matches: 363
- Goals: 893 (2.46 per match)
- Top goalscorer: Slim Mezlini (14 goals)
- Biggest home win: Al-Eetemad 6–0 Al-Bateen (2 February 2024)
- Biggest away win: Al-Mujazzal 0–5 Al-Qala (16 February 2024); Muhayil 0–5 Al-Ghottah (9 March 2024)
- Highest scoring: Al-Ghazwah 2–5 Al-Mujazzal (24 February 2024)
- Longest winning run: Al-Fao; Al-Tuhami (6 matches)
- Longest unbeaten run: Al-Tuhami (18 matches)
- Longest winless run: Al-Mujazzal (15 matches)
- Longest losing run: Al-Amjad (6 matches)
- All statistics correct as of 23 March 2024.

The 2023–24 Saudi Third Division was the third season of the Saudi Third Division since its inception in 2021. The season started on 3 November 2023 and concluded with the final on 23 March 2024. The group stage draw was held on 29 May 2023.

The final was played on 23 March 2024 between Al-Anwar and Al-Ula. Al-Ula defeated Al-Anwar 8–7 on penalties (2–2 after extra time) to win their first title.

== Overview ==
=== Changes ===
On 14 April 2022, the Saudi FF announced that the number of teams in the Third Division would increase from 32 to 40 teams starting from the 2023–24 season. To prepare for this change, 14 teams were promoted from the Fourth Division to the Third Division instead of four teams. It was also announced that the numbers of teams promoted from the Third Division to the Second Division would be decreased to four instead of six.

== Team changes ==
A total of 40 teams are contesting the league, including 22 sides from the 2022–23 season, 4 relegated teams from the Second Division, and 14 promoted teams from the Fourth Division.

=== To Third Division ===
Promoted from the Fourth Division

- Al-Hada
- Munief
- Al-Ghazwah
- Al-Hilaliyah
- Al-Salam
- Al-Eetemad
- Al-Muzahimiyyah
- Al-Mehmal
- Jubbah
- Al-Taraf
- Al-Asyah
- Haql
- Al-Fao
- Khaybar

Relegated from Second Division

- Qilwah
- Al-Sharq
- Al-Nahda
- Sajer

=== From Third Division ===
Promoted to Second Division

- Mudhar
- Al-Noor
- Al-Jubail
- Afif
- Al-Houra
- Al-Nojoom

Relegated to the Fourth Division

- Ras Tanura
- Al-Hejaz
- Al-Waseel
- Al-Sawari

== Teams ==
;Group A

Locations of teams in the 2023–24 Saudi Third Division Group A

Club	Location	Stadium
Al-Amjad	Sabya	King Faisal Sport City Stadium (Jizan)
Al-Asyah	Asyah	Al-Bukiryah Club Stadium (Al Bukayriyah)
Al-Dera'a	Dawadmi	Al-Dera'a Club Stadium
Al-Ghottah	Mawqaq	Al-Jabalain Club Stadium (Ha'il)
Al-Mehmal	Thadig	Al-Hamadah Club Stadium (Al-Ghat)
Al-Tuhami	Jizan	King Faisal Sport City Stadium
Khaybar	Khaybar	Ohod Club Stadium (Medina)
Muhayil	Muhayil	Muhayil Club Stadium
Munief	Turubah	Okaz Club Stadium (Ta'if)
Sajer	Sajir	Al-Washm Club Stadium (Shaqraa)

Group B

Locations of teams in the 2023–24 Saudi Third Division Group B

Club	Location	Stadium
Al-Anwar	Hotat Bani Tamim	Al-Anwar Club Stadium
Al-Bateen	Dhurma	Al-Bateen Club Stadium
Al-Eetemad	Raudat Sudair	Najd Club Stadium (H̨awţah Sudayr)
Al-Ghazwah	Badr	Al-Ghazwah Club Stadium
Al-Mujazzal	Al Majma'ah	Al-Hamadah Club Stadium (Al-Ghat)
Al-Nahda	Dammam	Prince Fahd bin Salman Stadium
Al-Omran	Al-Hasa (Al-Omran)	Hajer Club Stadium
Al-Qala	Sakakah	Al-Qala Club Stadium
Al-Qawarah	Al Quwarah	Al-Qawarah Club Stadium
Jubbah	Jubbah	Al-Jabalain Club Stadium (Ha'il)

Group C

Locations of teams in the 2023–24 Saudi Third Division Group C

Club	Location	Stadium
Al-Dahab	Mahd adh Dhahab	Ohod Club Stadium (Medina)
Al-Fao	Wadi ad-Dawasir	Prince Nasser bin Abdul Aziz Sports City
Al-Hilaliyah	Al Bukayriyah	Department of Education Stadium (Unaizah)
Al-Muzahimiyyah	Al-Muzahmiyya	Irqah Sports Stadium (Riyadh)
Al-Selmiyah	Al-Salamiyah	Al-Anwar Club Stadium (Hotat Bani Tamim)
Al-Tasamoh	Al Qunfudhah	Department of Education Stadium
Al-Ula	Al-'Ula	Al-Ansar Club Stadium (Medina)
Al-Watani	Tabuk	King Khalid Sport City Stadium
Qilwah	Qilwah	Qilwah Club Stadium
Radwa	Yanbu	Al-Majd Club Stadium

Group D

Locations of teams in the 2023–24 Saudi Third Division Group D

Club	Location	Stadium
Al-Hada	Tarout Island	Al-Safa Club Stadium (Safwa City)
Al-Khaldi	Al Wajh	Al-Khaldi Club Stadium
Al-Salam	Al-Awamiyah	Al-Safa Club Stadium (Safwa City)
Al-Sharq	Ad-Dilam	Al-Shoulla Club Stadium (Al-Kharj)
Al-Taraf	Al-Hasa (Al-Taraf)	Prince Abdullah bin Jalawi Reserve Stadium
Al-Thoqbah	Khobar	Prince Nayef bin Abdulaziz Stadium (Qatif)
Baish	Baish	Baish Club Stadium
Haql	Haql	Haql Club Stadium
Qaryah Al-Ulya	Qaryat al-Ulya	Qaryah Al-Ulya Club Stadium
Sharurah	Sharurah	Sharurah Club Stadium

=== Foreign players ===
On 30 June 2023, the SAFF announced that clubs are allowed to register 2 foreign players for each team.

Players name in bold indicates the player is registered during the mid-season transfer window.

Club	Player 1	Player 2	Former Players
Al-Amjad	(Brazil) **Dennis Oliveira**	(Egypt) Nader Moosa	(Yemen) Hekel Hadi
Al-Anwar	(Ivory Coast) Guillaume Daho	(Brazil) Murilo Souza	
Al-Asyah	(Egypt) **Yousef Fawzi**	(Senegal) **Baba Cissé**	(Tunisia) Mohamed Khelij (Tunisia) Wassim Sioud
Al-Bateen	(Tunisia) Adel Fitouri	(Tunisia) Aymen Ezzine	
Al-Dahab	(Guinea) **Aboubacar Camara**	(Senegal) **Adramé Diallo**	(Egypt) Mohamed Ramadan (Egypt) Mohamed Shika
Al-Dera'a	(Tunisia) Belhassen Mejri	(Tunisia) Hosni Abidi	
Al-Eetemad	(Mauritania) Fody Traoré	(Tunisia) Slim Mezlini	
Al-Fao	(Chad) Abdallah Abdelrazakh	(Nigeria) **Hassani Essam**	(Libya) Mohamed El Hami
Al-Ghazwah	(Chad) Taher Mahamat	(Sudan) Ammar Babaeir	
Al-Ghottah	(Egypt) **Ali Khalil**	(Tunisia) **Omar Lamti**	(Sudan) Omar Youssef (Tunisia) Rami Tahi
Al-Hada	(Tunisia) Ahmed Fazani	(Tunisia) Mohamed Amine Khaloui	
Al-Helaliah	(Sudan) Ayoub Nahar	(Sudan) Jasser Hamed	
Al-Khaldi	(Ghana) Daniel Aryeetey	(Ghana) Kwame Yeboah	
Al-Mehmal	(Japan) **Yamato Kline**	(Japan) **Ryosuke Nakajima**	(Egypt) Ali Aboul Ela (Egypt) Mohamed Awad
Al-Mujazzal	(Egypt) **Mohamed Atef**	(Egypt) **Mostafa El Sanfawy**	(Egypt) Ahmed Ayhab (Ghana) Kelvin Fous
Al-Muzahimiyyah	(Egypt) **Mohamed Awad**	(Senegal) Lamine Touré	
Al-Nahda	(Sudan) Waleed Al-Shoala	(Tunisia) Adel Hamani	
Al-Omran	(Tunisia) Firas Makni	(Tunisia) Hassan Chelly	
Al-Qala	(Morocco) **Anouar El Azizi**	(Nigeria) **Daniel Nosike**	(Algeria) Hamek Abbes (Algeria) Kheireddine Haddam
Al-Qawarah	(Egypt) Mohamed Fathi	(Egypt) Sokrat	
Al-Salam	(Cameroon) **Arnold Lemb**	(Egypt) Karim Rashed	(Egypt) Ahmed El Shaarawy
Al-Selmiyah	(Yemen) **Shadi Ahmed**	(Yemen) Ahmed Belkheir	(Algeria) Mohamed El Amine Hammouche
Al-Sharq	(Cameroon) **Boris Bissemou**	(Romania) **Petrișor Voinea**	(Algeria) Mohamed Amine Hamia (Tunisia) Ahmed Trabelsi
Al-Taraf	(Nigeria) **Imran Ilyas**	(Nigeria) Gbolahan Salami	(Egypt) Noor Bayoumi
Al-Tasamoh	(Iraq) Alaa Al-Fayadh	(Iraq) Yousef Al-Dulaim	
Al-Thoqbah	(Algeria) Youssef Messaoudi	(Nigeria) **Victory Omodiagbe**	(Liberia) Dauda Bortu
Al-Tuhami	(Ghana) **Maxwell Abbey Quaye**	(Yemen) Nader Sahal	(Tunisia) Oussama Ben Maammar
Al-Ula	(Brazil) Allan Sousa	(Guinea) **Ousmane Barry**	(Nigeria) Christian Irobiso
Al-Watani	(Tunisia) Hamza Banouh	(Tunisia) Montasser Ferchichi	
Baish	(Egypt) Ahmed Hamdi	(Tunisia) Sami Hammami	
Haql	(Egypt) Mohamed Sameh	(Egypt) Mahmoud El Halawani	
Jubbah	(Brazil) Charles Oliveira	(Tunisia) **Oussama Ben Maammar**	(Jordan) Muath Afaneh
Khaybar	(Algeria) **Mihoub Hirech**	(Nigeria) **Shuaibu Ibrahim**	(Niger) Mustapha Adam (Nigeria) Abdulelah Sali
Muhayil	(Tunisia) Rayed Derbali	(Yemen) **Bakri Mohammed**	(Egypt) Ahmed Hamza
Munief	(Egypt) Salah Khattab	(Tunisia) **Malek Landoulsi**	(Egypt) Ahmed El Aash
Qaryat Al-Ulya	(Egypt) **Ahmed El Shaarawy**	(Egypt) Hisham Roshdi	(Egypt) Sayed Salah
Qilwah	(Nigeria) **Charles Ikechukwu**	(Tunisia) Yassine Boufalgha	(Tunisia) Riadh Souilmi
Radwa	(Mauritania) **Dominique Da Sylva**	(Mauritania) Abou Sy	(Nigeria) Shuaibu Ibrahim
Sajer	(Jordan) **Muath Afaneh**	(Tunisia) Lassaad Jaziri	(Ghana) Bernard Arthur
Sharurah	(Nigeria) **Blessing Henshaw**	(Tunisia) Oussama Hsini	(Tunisia) Mohamed Amine Ben Romdhane

== Group A ==
=== League table ===
Pos	Team	Pld	W	D	L	GF	GA	GD	Pts	Promotion, qualification or relegation
1	Al-Ghottah (P)	18	12	4	2	27	6	+21	40 (Note: Al-Ghottah finished ahead of Al-Tuhami on overall goal difference: Al-Ghottah +21, Al-Tuhami +20 (Al-Tuhami 0–0 Al-Ghottah, Al-Ghottah 0–0 Al-Tuhami).)	Promotion to the Second Division and qualification to the semi-finals
2	Al-Tuhami	18	11	7	0	28	8	+20	40	
3	Munief	18	8	4	6	28	20	+8	28	
4	Al-Asyah	18	7	4	7	20	21	−1	25	
5	Muhayil	18	6	6	6	26	29	−3	24	
6	Sajer	18	6	4	8	14	23	−9	22	
7	Al-Dera'a	18	4	7	7	16	24	−8	19	
8	Al-Mehmal	18	5	3	10	17	25	−8	18	
9	Al-Amjad	18	5	1	12	15	22	−7	16 (Note: Al-Amjad finished ahead of Khaybar on overall goal difference: Al-Amjad –7, Khaybar –13 (Khaybar 1–0 Al-Amjad, Al-Amjad 1–0 Khaybar).)	
10	Khaybar (R)	18	4	4	10	16	29	−13	16	Relegation to the Fourth Division

Updated to match(es) played on 9 March 2024. Source: Goalzz
Rules for classification: 1) Points; 2) Head-to-Head points; 3) Head-to-Head goal difference; 4) Head-to-Head goals scored; 5) Total goal difference; 6) Total goals scored; 7) Play-off (only for deciding champion, promotion and relegation).
(P) Promoted; (R) Relegated

=== Results ===
Home \ Away	AMJ	ASY	DER	GHO	MEH	TUH	KHA	MUH	MUN	SAJ
Al-Amjad		2–0	1–2	0–1	2–3	2–3	1–0	0–0	0–2	2–1
Al-Asyah	0–2		1–0	1–1	2–2	1–1	2–1	2–1	2–1	1–0
Al-Dera'a	1–0	2–0		1–3	1–1	1–1	0–2	1–1	2–2	0–0
Al-Ghottah	1–0	0–1	0–0		1–0	0–0	2–0	3–1	1–0	3–0
Al-Mehmal	1–0	2–0	1–0	0–1		0–1	1–2	1–2	1–4	0–1
Al-Tuhami	1–0	1–0	4–0	0–0	4–1		4–1	2–0	1–1	2–0
Khaybar	1–0	1–1	3–1	0–3	1–1	0–1		0–4	0–2	1–2
Muhayil	4–2	2–1	1–3	0–5	1–0	1–1	2–2		2–1	0–1
Munief	0–1	2–1	2–0	2–0	1–2	0–1	1–1	2–2		2–1
Sajer	1–0	0–4	1–1	0–2	1–0	0–0	1–0	2–2	2–3	

Updated to match(es) played on 9 March 2024. Source: kooora.com
Legend: Blue = home team win; Yellow = draw; Red = away team win.
For upcoming matches, an "a" indicates there is an article about the rivalry between the two participants.

== Group B ==
=== League table ===
Pos	Team	Pld	W	D	L	GF	GA	GD	Pts	Promotion, qualification or relegation
1	Al-Anwar (P)	18	10	4	4	30	13	+17	34	Promotion to the Second Division and qualification to the semi-finals
2	Al-Omran	18	10	2	6	26	12	+14	32	
3	Al-Eetemad	18	8	4	6	37	25	+12	28 (Note: Al-Eetemad finished ahead of Al-Qala on overall goal difference: Al-Eetemad +12, Al-Qala +6 (Al-Eetemad 0–0 Al-Qala, Al-Qala 2–2 Al-Eetemad).)	
4	Al-Qala	18	8	4	6	23	17	+6	28	
5	Al-Bateen	18	7	5	6	17	26	−9	26	
6	Al-Ghazwah	18	6	7	5	27	25	+2	25	
7	Jubbah	18	6	6	6	26	32	−6	24	
8	Al-Qawarah	18	6	4	8	22	23	−1	22	
9	Al-Nahda	18	3	9	6	13	22	−9	18	
10	Al-Mujazzal (R)	18	1	5	12	14	40	−26	8	Relegation to the Fourth Division

Updated to match(es) played on 9 March 2024. Source: Goalzz
Rules for classification: 1) Points; 2) Head-to-Head points; 3) Head-to-Head goal difference; 4) Head-to-Head goals scored; 5) Total goal difference; 6) Total goals scored; 7) Play-off (only for deciding champion, promotion and relegation).
(P) Promoted; (R) Relegated

=== Results ===
Home \ Away	ANW	BAT	EET	GHA	MUJ	NAH	OMR	QAL	QAW	JUB
Al-Anwar		2–0	4–0	0–1	2–0	0–0	0–2	2–1	3–0	3–3
Al-Bateen	1–0		1–4	0–0	1–0	1–1	1–1	1–2	2–0	1–0
Al-Eetemad	0–2	6–0		2–3	3–0	3–0	0–1	0–0	2–1	4–2
Al-Ghazwah	0–0	1–1	3–3		2–5	1–0	2–3	2–3	1–0	4–1
Al-Mujazzal	1–3	2–3	1–1	0–3		0–0	0–3	0–5	1–1	0–0
Al-Nahda	2–1	1–1	0–4	1–1	3–1		0–0	2–0	1–1	1–1
Al-Omran	1–2	0–1	2–0	1–0	4–1	3–0		0–1	1–0	3–0
Al-Qala	0–1	0–1	2–2	1–1	1–0	2–0	1–0		0–1	0–1
Al-Qawarah	0–0	3–0	3–1	1–1	3–0	2–1	2–1	1–2		2–4
Jubbah	1–5	3–1	0–2	3–1	2–2	0–0	1–0	2–2	2–1	

Updated to match(es) played on 9 March 2024. Source: kooora.com
Legend: Blue = home team win; Yellow = draw; Red = away team win.
For upcoming matches, an "a" indicates there is an article about the rivalry between the two participants.

== Group C ==
=== League table ===
Pos	Team	Pld	W	D	L	GF	GA	GD	Pts	Promotion, qualification or relegation
1	Al-Ula (C, P)	18	11	4	3	35	15	+20	37	Promotion to the Second Division and qualification to the semi-finals
2	Radwa	18	10	5	3	30	17	+13	35	
3	Al-Fao	18	9	4	5	23	18	+5	31	
4	Al-Hilaliyah	18	7	5	6	23	22	+1	26	
5	Qilwah	18	6	6	6	19	23	−4	24	
6	Al-Muzahimiyyah	18	6	5	7	20	18	+2	23 (Note: Al-Muzahimiyyah finished ahead of Al-Selmiyah on head-to-head points: Al-Muzahimiyyah: 4 pts, Al-Selmiyah: 1 pts (Al-Selmiyah 1–1 Al-Muzahimiyyah, Al-Muzahimiyyah 3–1 Al-Selmiyah).)	
7	Al-Selmiyah	18	6	5	7	19	22	−3	23	
8	Al-Watani	18	5	4	9	19	28	−9	19	
9	Al-Dahab	18	4	5	9	17	28	−11	17	
10	Al-Tasamoh (R)	18	2	5	11	23	37	−14	11	Relegation to the Fourth Division

Updated to match(es) played on 8 March 2024. Source: Goalzz
Rules for classification: 1) Points; 2) Head-to-Head points; 3) Head-to-Head goal difference; 4) Head-to-Head goals scored; 5) Total goal difference; 6) Total goals scored; 7) Play-off (only for deciding champion, promotion and relegation).
(C) Champions; (P) Promoted; (R) Relegated

=== Results ===
Home \ Away	DAH	FAO	HIL	MUZ	SEL	TAS	ULA	WAT	QIL	RAD
Al-Dahab		2–2	1–3	1–0	0–2	2–0	1–1	2–0	0–0	1–1
Al-Fao	3–0		2–0	1–1	0–1	2–1	1–0	0–2	1–1	3–2
Al-Hilaliyah	4–2	0–0		2–1	1–3	2–1	1–1	3–0	1–0	0–1
Al-Muzahimiyyah	2–1	0–1	1–0		3–1	3–0	0–2	1–1	2–0	2–1
Al-Selmiyah	0–1	0–1	2–0	1–1		4–2	0–0	0–0	2–2	0–0
Al-Tasamoh	2–0	3–0	2–2	1–1	2–3		1–5	2–2	1–1	1–2
Al-Ula	3–1	3–1	0–0	1–0	3–0	2–1		4–1	4–0	1–2
Al-Watani	2–1	0–2	2–0	0–0	2–0	3–1	2–3		0–2	1–3
Qilwah	1–1	0–2	1–2	2–1	1–0	2–1	2–0	3–1		1–1
Radwa	2–0	2–1	2–2	2–1	3–0	1–1	1–2	1–0	3–0	

Updated to match(es) played on 8 March 2024. Source: kooora.com
Legend: Blue = home team win; Yellow = draw; Red = away team win.
For upcoming matches, an "a" indicates there is an article about the rivalry between the two participants.

== Group D ==
=== League table ===
Pos	Team	Pld	W	D	L	GF	GA	GD	Pts	Promotion, qualification or relegation
1	Al-Sharq (P)	18	12	4	2	32	15	+17	40	Promotion to the Second Division and qualification to the semi-finals
2	Baish	18	11	3	4	30	13	+17	36	
3	Qaryah Al-Ulya	18	9	5	4	28	19	+9	32	
4	Al-Khaldi	18	8	1	9	19	24	−5	25	
5	Al-Taraf	18	5	7	6	20	20	0	22 (Note: Al-Taraf finished ahead of Al-Salam on overall goal difference: Al-Taraf 0, Al-Salam −4 (Al-Salam 1–1 Al-Taraf, Al-Taraf 1–1 Al-Salam).)	
6	Al-Salam	18	5	7	6	16	20	−4	22	
7	Haql	18	6	3	9	21	27	−6	21	
8	Al-Hada	18	5	4	9	24	22	+2	19	
9	Sharurah	18	5	2	11	16	33	−17	17	
10	Al-Thoqbah (R)	18	4	4	10	12	25	−13	16	Relegation to the Fourth Division

Updated to match(es) played on 8 March 2024. Source: Goalzz
Rules for classification: 1) Points; 2) Head-to-Head points; 3) Head-to-Head goal difference; 4) Head-to-Head goals scored; 5) Total goal difference; 6) Total goals scored; 7) Play-off (only for deciding champion, promotion and relegation).
(P) Promoted; (R) Relegated

=== Results ===
Home \ Away	HAD	KHA	SAL	SHR	TAR	THO	BAI	HAQ	QAR	SHA
Al-Hada		4–1	0–0	1–2	2–2	1–2	0–1	2–0	1–1	4–2
Al-Khaldi	2–1		0–0	1–2	1–0	0–1	0–2	3–2	1–0	1–0
Al-Salam	0–2	2–1		3–2	1–1	2–1	0–0	2–1	0–1	1–0
Al-Sharq	1–0	1–0	1–0		1–1	4–1	2–0	1–1	3–1	2–0
Al-Taraf	2–1	2–1	1–1	0–0		0–2	2–1	0–1	2–0	3–0
Al-Thoqbah	1–3	1–3	0–0	0–3	0–0		2–1	0–1	0–0	0–1
Baish	1–0	4–1	1–0	3–1	2–0	3–0		0–0	0–2	4–1
Haql	2–1	0–1	3–2	1–3	2–2	1–0	0–2		1–3	3–0
Qaryah Al-Ulya	1–0	2–0	3–0	2–2	2–1	1–1	1–1	4–2		2–0
Sharurah	1–1	0–2	2–2	0–1	2–1	1–0	1–4	1–0	4–2	

Updated to match(es) played on 8 March 2024. Source: kooora.com
Legend: Blue = home team win; Yellow = draw; Red = away team win.
For upcoming matches, an "a" indicates there is an article about the rivalry between the two participants.

== Play-offs ==
=== Championship play-offs ===
==== Semi-finals ====
16 March 2024
22:00 UTC+3

Al-Ghottah	0–1	Al-Anwar
		Al-Meatesh 90+4'

Al-Jabalain Club Stadium, Ha'il
16 March 2024
22:00 UTC+3

Al-Sharq	0–0 (a.e.t.)	Al-Ula
Penalties
Al-Ajmi (penalty scored); Al-Ramili (penalty missed); Voinea (penalty scored); Al-Najrani (penalty scored); Al-Enezi (penalty missed)	3–4	(penalty scored) Barry; (penalty scored) Al-Sobhi; (penalty scored) T. Al-Otaibi; (penalty scored) Al-Mogahwi

Al-Shoulla Club Stadium, Al-Kharj

==== Final ====
23 March 2024
22:00 UTC+3

Al-Ula	2–2 (a.e.t.)	Al-Anwar
Barry 89'; Al-Shelali 120'	Report	Daho 59' (pen.), 96'
Penalties
Barry (penalty scored); Al-Sobhi (penalty scored); Al-Burayk (penalty missed); Al-Shelali (penalty scored); Sousa (penalty scored); Al-Kanani (penalty scored); M. Al-Otaibi (penalty scored); Baalghyth (penalty scored); Al-Sharqi (penalty missed); Al-Khaibari (penalty scored)	8–7	(penalty scored) Al-Hamdani; (penalty missed) Al-Thunayan; (penalty scored) Al-Rassi; (penalty scored) Hussein; (penalty scored) Mando; (penalty scored) Al-Shahrani; (penalty scored) Al-Merdasi; (penalty scored) Jahfali; (penalty missed) Arishi; (penalty missed) Al-Mojalli

Prince Mohammed bin Abdulaziz Stadium, Medina
Referee: Moussa Abo Shaqqara

== Statistics ==
=== Top scorers ===
As of 23 March 2024

Rank	Player	Club	Goals
1	(Tunisia) Slim Mezlini	Al-Eetemad	14
2	(Algeria) Hamza Banouh	Al-Watani	11
2	(Egypt) Salah Khattab	Munief	11
4	(Tunisia) Hassan Chelly	Al-Omran	10
4	(Ivory Coast) Guillaume Daho	Al-Anwar	10
4	(Mauritania) Fody Traoré	Al-Eetemad	10
7	(Morocco) Anouar El Azizi	Al-Qala	9
7	(Saudi Arabia) Mashl Noman	Al-Ghottah	9
7	(Saudi Arabia) Naif Abdali	Baish	9
10	(Brazil) Allan Sousa	Al-Ula	8
10	(Saudi Arabia) Qassem Messawa	Radwa	8
10	(Saudi Arabia) Yahya Al-Absi	Al-Ghazwah	8
10	(Tunisia) Oussama Ben Maammar	Al-Tuhami/Jubbah	8

==== Hat-tricks ====
Player	For	Against	Result	Date	Ref.
(Yemen) Saleh Mabrook	Al-Mehmal	Al-Amjad	3–2 (A)	18 November 2023	
(Mauritania) Fody Traoré^{4}	Al-Eetemad	Al-Bateen	4–1 (A)	25 November 2023	
(Tunisia) Slim Mezlini	Al-Eetemad	Jubbah	4–2 (H)	9 December 2023	
(Chad) Abdullah Abdulrazzaq	Al-Fao	Radwa	3–2 (H)	16 December 2023	
(Ivory Coast) Guillaume Daho	Al-Anwar	Al-Eetemad	4–0 (H)	22 December 2023	
(Saudi Arabia) Yahya Al-Absi	Al-Ghazwah	Al-Eetemad	3–2 (A)	11 January 2024	
(Saudi Arabia) Naif Abdali	Baish	Sharurah	4–1 (H)	26 January 2024	
(Guinea) Ousmane Barry	Al-Ula	Al-Watani	3–2 (A)	26 January 2024	
(Tunisia) Slim Mezlini	Al-Eetemad	Al-Bateen	6–0 (H)	2 February 2024	
(Tunisia) Oussama Ben Maammar^{4}	Jubbah	Al-Qawarah	4–2 (A)	8 February 2024	
(Saudi Arabia) Zamil Al-Sulim	Al-Hilaliyah	Al-Dahab	4–2 (H)	9 February 2024	
(Morocco) Anouar El Azizi^{4}	Al-Qala	Al-Mujazzal	5–0 (A)	16 February 2024	
(Yemen) Faisal Ghadrah	Al-Mujazzal	Al-Ghazwah	5–2 (A)	24 February 2024	
(Saudi Arabia) Mohanad Al-Shudukhi	Al-Asyah	Sajer	4–0 (A)	5 March 2024	

Note

(H) – Home; (A) – Away
^{4} Player scored 4 goals

== Number of teams by province ==
Rank	Province	Number	Teams
1	Riyadh	11	Al-Anwar, Al-Bateen, Al-Dera'a, Al-Eetemad, Al-Fao, Al-Mehmal, Al-Mujazzal, Al-Muzahimiyyah, Al-Selmiyah, Al-Sharq and Sajer
2	Eastern Province	7	Al-Hada, Al-Nahda, Al-Omran, Al-Salam, Al-Taraf, Al-Thoqbah and Qaryah Al-Ulya
3	Medina	5	Al-Dahab, Al-Ghazwah, Al-Ula, Khaybar and Radwa
4	Al-Qassim	3	Al-Asyah, Al-Hilaliyah and Al-Qawarah
4	Jazan	3	Al-Amjad, Al-Tuhami and Baish
4	Tabuk	3	Al-Khaldi, Al-Watani and Haql
7	Ha'il	2	Al-Ghottah and Jubbah
7	Mecca	2	Al-Tasamoh and Munief
9	Al-Bahah	1	Qilwah
9	Al-Jawf	1	Al-Qala
9	Asir	1	Muhayil
9	Najran	1	Sharurah

== See also ==
- 2023–24 Saudi Pro League
- 2023–24 Saudi First Division League
- 2023–24 Saudi Second Division
