= 2025–26 Saudi Third Division =

30th season of the Saudi Third Division

Saudi Third Division
- Season: 2025–26
- Dates: 24 October 2025 – 12 March 2026
- Champions: Al-Qwarah (1st title)
- Promoted: Al-Qwarah; Qilwah; Al-Hada; Baish
- Relegated: Al-Qarah; Al-Muzahimiyyah; Al-Tuhami; Haql
- Matches: 363
- Goals: 882 (2.43 per match)
- Top goalscorer: Mohammed Al-Mutairi; Abdullah Abalkhail (14 goals each)
- Biggest home win: Al-Qwarah 6–0 Haql (9 January 2026)
- Biggest away win: Al-Nakhal 0–4 Al-Ghazwa (1 November 2025); Al-Fadhl 0–4 Al-Fao (1 March 2026)
- Highest scoring: Blue Star 7–2 Al-Ghazwa (6 December 2025)
- Longest winning run: Al-Qwarah (8 matches)
- Longest unbeaten run: Muhayil (14 matches)
- Longest winless run: Haql (17 matches)
- Longest losing run: Haql (13 matches)
- All statistics correct as of 12 March 2026.

The 2025–26 Saudi Third Division was the 30th season of the Saudi Third Division since its inception in 1996 and fifth season under the new format introduced in 2021. The season started on 24 October 2025 and concluded with the final on 12 March 2026. The group stage draw was held on 28 May 2025.

The final was played on 12 March 2026 between Al-Qwarah and Qilwah. Al-Qwarah defeated Qilwah 1–0 to win their first title.

== Overview ==
=== Changes ===
On 16 December 2024, the Saudi FF announced that no foreign players would be allowed in the league starting from the 2025–26 season.

== Team changes ==
A total of 40 teams are contesting the league, including 32 sides from the 2024–25 season, 4 relegated teams from the Second Division, and 4 promoted teams from the Fourth Division.

=== To Third Division ===
Promoted from the Fourth Division

- Blue Star
- Al-Qarah
- Al-Alamin
- Al-Maseef

Relegated from Second Division

- Al-Taqadom
- Al-Houra
- Al-Ansar
- Al-Qaisumah

=== From Third Division ===
Promoted to Second Division

- Al-Qala
- Jubbah
- Afif
- Al-Nairyah

Relegated to the Fourth Division

- Al-Taraf
- Al-Salam
- Al-Hedaya
- Al-Amjad

== Teams ==
Group A

Locations of teams in the 2025–26 Saudi Third Division Group A

Club	Location	Stadium
Al-Alamin	Khafji	Al-Alamin Club Stadium
Al-Asyah	Asyah	Al-Bukiryah Club Stadium (Al Bukayriyah)
Al-Eetemad	Raudat Sudair	Najd Club Stadium (H̨awţah Sudayr)
Al-Khaldi	Al Wajh	Al-Khaldi Club Stadium
Al-Mehmal	Thadig	Al-Hamadah Club Stadium (Al-Ghat)
Al-Qaisumah	Qaisumah	Al-Batin Club Stadium (Hafar al-Batin)
Al-Tuhami	Jizan	King Faisal Sport City Stadium
Baish	Baish	Baish Club Stadium
Munief	Turubah	Okaz Club Stadium (Ta'if)
Sajer	Sajir	Al-Washm Club Stadium (Shaqraa)

Group B

Locations of teams in the 2025–26 Saudi Third Division Group B

Club	Location	Stadium
Al-Bateen	Dhurma	Al-Bateen Club Stadium
Al-Fadhl	Al-Hasa (Al Fodhool)	Al-Rawdhah Club Stadium
Al-Fao	Wadi ad-Dawasir	Prince Nasser bin Abdul Aziz Sports City
Al-Hilaliyah	Al Bukayriyah	Department of Education Stadium (Unaizah)
Al-Houra	Umluj	Al-Houra Club Stadium
Al-Maseef	Al Masgi	Prince Sultan bin Abdul Aziz Reserve Stadium (Abha)
Al-Muzahimiyyah	Al-Muzahmiyya	Irqah Sports Stadium (Riyadh)
Al-Watani	Tabuk	King Khalid Sport City Stadium
Al-Yarmouk	Abu ʽArish	King Faisal Sport City Stadium (Jizan)
Qilwah	Qilwah	Qilwah Club Stadium

Group C

Locations of teams in the 2025–26 Saudi Third Division Group C

Club	Location	Stadium
Al-Dera'a	Dawadmi	Al-Dera'a Club Stadium
Al-Hada	Tarout Island	Al-Safa Club Stadium (Safwa City)
Al-Nahda	Dammam	Prince Fahd bin Salman Stadium
Al-Noor	Tarout Island (Sanabes)	Prince Nayef bin Abdulaziz Stadium (Qatif)
Al-Omran	Al-Hasa (Al-Omran)	Hajer Club Stadium
Al-Qarah	Al-Hasa (Al-Qarah)	Al-Rawdhah Club Stadium
Al-Selmiyah	Al-Salamiyah	Al-Anwar Club Stadium (Hotat Bani Tamim)
Al-Shaeib	Huraymila	Irqah Sports Stadium (Riyadh)
Al-Taqadom	Al Mithnab	Al-Taqadom Club Stadium
Radwa	Yanbu	Al-Majd Club Stadium

Group D

Locations of teams in the 2025–26 Saudi Third Division Group D

Club	Location	Stadium
Al-Ansar	Medina	Al-Ansar Club Stadium
Al-Dahab	Mahd adh Dhahab	Ohod Club Stadium (Medina)
Al-Ghazwa	Badr	Al-Ghazwa Club Stadium
Al-Nakhal	Yanbu	Al-Majd Club Stadium
Al-Qwarah	Al Qwarah	Al-Qwarah Club Stadium
Blue Star	Hafar al-Batin	Al-Batin Club Stadium
Haql	Haql	Haql Club Stadium
Muhayil	Muhayil	Muhayil Club Stadium
Qaryah Al-Ulya	Qaryat al-Ulya	Qaryah Al-Ulya Club Stadium
Sharurah	Sharurah	Sharurah Club Stadium

== Group A ==
=== League table ===
Pos	Team	Pld	W	D	L	GF	GA	GD	Pts	Promotion, qualification or relegation
1	Baish (P)	18	10	6	2	28	15	+13	36	Promotion to the Second Division and qualification to the semi-finals
2	Al-Qaisumah	18	9	7	2	28	15	+13	31 (Note: Al-Qaisumah finished ahead of Al-Mehmal on overall goal difference: Al-Qaisumah +13, Al-Mehmal +8 (Al-Mehmal 0–1 Al-Qaisumah, Al-Qaisumah 0–1 Al-Mehmal).) (Note: Al-Qaisumah were deducted three points for failing to meet payment obligations.)	
3	Al-Mehmal	18	10	1	7	24	16	+8	31	
4	Sajer	18	6	7	5	24	23	+1	25	
5	Al-Alamin	18	4	9	5	17	21	−4	21 (Note: Positions determined by head-to-head points: Al-Alamin: 7 pts; Al-Khaldi: 5 pts; Al-Eetemad: 4 pts.)	
6	Al-Khaldi	18	5	6	7	11	20	−9	21	
7	Al-Eetemad	18	6	3	9	21	23	−2	21	
8	Munief	18	4	8	6	15	19	−4	20	
9	Al-Asyah	18	4	7	7	12	18	−6	19	
10	Al-Tuhami (R)	18	3	4	11	16	26	−10	13	Relegation to the Fourth Division

Updated to match(es) played on 27 February 2026. Source: saff.com.sa
Rules for classification: 1) Points; 2) Head-to-Head points; 3) Head-to-Head goal difference; 4) Head-to-Head goals scored; 5) Total goal difference; 6) Total goals scored; 7) Play-off (only for deciding champion, promotion and relegation).
(P) Promoted; (R) Relegated

=== Results ===
Home \ Away	ALA	ASY	EET	KHA	MEH	QAI	TUH	BAI	MUN	SAJ
Al-Alamin		0–2	3–2	0–1	1–1	0–2	1–2	1–1	0–0	2–1
Al-Asyah	0–0		0–0	1–0	0–3	2–5	1–0	2–0	2–2	0–0
Al-Eetemad	0–1	0–0		3–0	0–3	2–0	1–0	0–2	3–0	1–2
Al-Khaldi	0–0	1–0	1–1		1–0	0–0	0–0	1–3	1–0	2–2
Al-Mehmal	3–1	1–0	1–2	0–1		0–1	1–0	1–0	3–1	1–2
Al-Qaisumah	1–1	2–0	2–1	4–1	0–1		2–1	1–1	1–0	1–1
Al-Tuhami	2–2	1–1	3–2	3–1	1–2	0–2		1–2	0–1	2–2
Baish	0–0	2–1	3–1	1–0	2–0	1–1	3–0		2–2	1–0
Munief	1–1	0–0	1–2	0–0	1–0	1–1	1–0	1–2		2–0
Sajer	2–3	1–0	1–0	2–0	2–3	2–2	1–0	2–2	1–1	

Updated to match(es) played on 27 February 2026. Source: saff.com.sa
Legend: Blue = home team win; Yellow = draw; Red = away team win.
For upcoming matches, an "a" indicates there is an article about the rivalry between the two participants.

== Group B ==
=== League table ===
Pos	Team	Pld	W	D	L	GF	GA	GD	Pts	Promotion, qualification or relegation
1	Qilwah (P)	18	12	4	2	27	13	+14	40	Promotion to the Second Division and qualification to the semi-finals
2	Al-Fao	18	11	4	3	33	13	+20	37	
3	Al-Watani	18	10	6	2	32	18	+14	36	
4	Al-Maseef	18	6	7	5	24	18	+6	25	
5	Al-Fadhl	18	5	5	8	12	25	−13	20	
6	Al-Houra	18	4	7	7	17	22	−5	19 (Note: Al-Houra finished ahead of Al-Yarmouk on head-to-head points: Al-Houra: 6 pts, Al-Yarmouk: 0 pts (Al-Yarmouk 3–5 Al-Houra, Al-Houra 1–0 Al-Yarmouk).)	
7	Al-Yarmouk	18	6	1	11	22	31	−9	19	
8	Al-Hilaliyah	18	4	6	8	15	24	−9	18	
9	Al-Bateen	18	3	7	8	17	24	−7	16	
10	Al-Muzahimiyyah (R)	18	3	5	10	16	27	−11	14	Relegation to the Fourth Division

Updated to match(es) played on 1 March 2026. Source: saff.com.sa
Rules for classification: 1) Points; 2) Head-to-Head points; 3) Head-to-Head goal difference; 4) Head-to-Head goals scored; 5) Total goal difference; 6) Total goals scored; 7) Play-off (only for deciding champion, promotion and relegation).
(P) Promoted; (R) Relegated

=== Results ===
Home \ Away	BAT	FAD	FAO	HIL	HOU	MAS	MUZ	WAT	YAR	QIL
Al-Bateen		0–0	2–2	0–0	0–3	0–0	1–0	0–3	2–3	1–1
Al-Fadhl	2–1		0–4	0–0	1–2	1–0	1–1	0–1	1–4	1–2
Al-Fao	0–0	0–1		6–1	1–0	3–2	1–0	1–2	1–0	3–0
Al-Hilaliyah	1–0	1–1	0–3		1–1	3–0	0–0	2–1	2–0	1–2
Al-Houra	0–3	0–0	0–1	2–2		0–0	2–3	1–1	1–0	0–2
Al-Maseef	0–3	2–0	0–0	2–0	3–0		2–1	2–2	6–1	1–1
Al-Muzahimiyyah	0–0	0–1	1–4	1–0	0–0	0–3		1–1	2–0	1–2
Al-Watani	5–3	4–1	3–1	1–0	0–0	1–1	3–2		2–1	0–0
Al-Yarmouk	2–0	0–1	0–1	2–1	3–5	0–0	4–2	0–2		1–0
Qilwah	2–1	3–0	1–1	2–0	1–0	2–0	2–1	2–0	2–1	

Updated to match(es) played on 1 March 2026. Source: saff.com.sa
Legend: Blue = home team win; Yellow = draw; Red = away team win.
For upcoming matches, an "a" indicates there is an article about the rivalry between the two participants.

== Group C ==
=== League table ===
Pos	Team	Pld	W	D	L	GF	GA	GD	Pts	Promotion, qualification or relegation
1	Al-Hada (P)	18	11	6	1	38	18	+20	39	Promotion to the Second Division and qualification to the semi-finals
2	Radwa	18	11	5	2	29	17	+12	38	
3	Al-Omran	18	9	5	4	24	15	+9	32	
4	Al-Selmiyah	18	6	7	5	21	21	0	25 (Note: Al-Selmiyah finished ahead of Al-Nahda on head-to-head points: Al-Selmiyah: 6 pts, Al-Nahda: 0 pts (Al-Selmiyah 2–1 Al-Nahda, Al-Nahda 0–1 Al-Selmiyah).)	
5	Al-Nahda	18	6	7	5	18	16	+2	25	
6	Al-Noor	18	4	8	6	15	18	−3	20	
7	Al-Shaeib	18	4	5	9	11	20	−9	17	
8	Al-Dera'a	18	4	4	10	18	24	−6	16 (Note: Al-Dera'a finished ahead of Al-Taqadom on head-to-head points: Al-Dera'a: 4 pts, Al-Taqadom: 1 pts (Al-Taqadom 0–0 Al-Dera'a, Al-Dera'a 2–0 Al-Taqadom).)	
9	Al-Taqadom	18	3	7	8	10	24	−14	16	
10	Al-Qarah (R)	18	4	2	12	17	28	−11	14	Relegation to the Fourth Division

Updated to match(es) played on 27 February 2026. Source: saff.com.sa
Rules for classification: 1) Points; 2) Head-to-Head points; 3) Head-to-Head goal difference; 4) Head-to-Head goals scored; 5) Total goal difference; 6) Total goals scored; 7) Play-off (only for deciding champion, promotion and relegation).
(P) Promoted; (R) Relegated

=== Results ===
Home \ Away	DER	HAD	NAH	NOR	OMR	QAR	SEL	SHA	TAQ	RAD
Al-Dera'a		1–2	1–1	0–1	1–0	1–2	1–2	0–1	2–0	3–3
Al-Hada	2–1		2–2	3–0	0–0	3–2	3–1	0–0	4–0	3–1
Al-Nahda	0–0	1–1		1–2	0–2	2–2	0–1	2–0	3–1	1–0
Al-Noor	2–3	1–3	0–0		1–1	3–1	0–0	0–1	0–0	0–1
Al-Omran	2–1	2–1	0–1	1–1		3–1	3–2	1–1	2–0	0–0
Al-Qarah	0–1	0–1	0–2	0–2	0–1		0–1	2–1	0–1	2–2
Al-Selmiyah	3–2	2–2	2–1	1–1	2–0	2–3		0–0	1–1	0–1
Al-Shaeib	1–0	1–3	0–1	0–0	0–3	0–2	0–0		3–0	1–2
Al-Taqadom	0–0	1–3	0–0	0–0	1–2	1–0	0–0	2–1		0–1
Radwa	2–0	2–2	2–0	2–1	2–1	1–0	3–1	2–0	2–2	

Updated to match(es) played on 27 February 2026. Source: saff.com.sa
Legend: Blue = home team win; Yellow = draw; Red = away team win.
For upcoming matches, an "a" indicates there is an article about the rivalry between the two participants.

== Group D ==
=== League table ===
Pos	Team	Pld	W	D	L	GF	GA	GD	Pts	Promotion, qualification or relegation
1	Al-Qwarah (C, P)	18	13	3	2	41	13	+28	42	Promotion to the Second Division and qualification to the semi-finals
2	Muhayil	18	11	6	1	35	21	+14	39	
3	Al-Dahab	18	9	6	3	28	15	+13	33	
4	Al-Ghazwa	18	9	2	7	26	24	+2	29	
5	Blue Star	18	8	3	7	35	29	+6	27	
6	Al-Ansar	18	6	6	6	25	22	+3	24	
7	Sharurah	18	5	4	9	23	30	−7	19 (Note: Sharurah finished ahead of Qaryah Al-Ulya on head-to-head goal difference: Sharurah +1 GD, Qaryah Al-Ulya –1 GD (Sharurah 1–2 Qaryah Al-Ulya, Qaryah Al-Ulya 0–2 Sharurah).)	
8	Qaryah Al-Ulya	18	5	4	9	18	30	−12	19	
9	Al-Nakhal	18	3	4	11	22	41	−19	13	
10	Haql (R)	18	1	2	15	15	43	−28	5	Relegation to the Fourth Division

Updated to match(es) played on 27 February 2026. Source: saff.com.sa
Rules for classification: 1) Points; 2) Head-to-Head points; 3) Head-to-Head goal difference; 4) Head-to-Head goals scored; 5) Total goal difference; 6) Total goals scored; 7) Play-off (only for deciding champion, promotion and relegation).
(C) Champions; (P) Promoted; (R) Relegated

=== Results ===
Home \ Away	ANS	DAH	GHA	NAK	QAW	BLU	HAQ	MUH	QAR	SHA
Al-Ansar		2–2	1–2	2–2	0–2	2–0	3–0	1–2	1–1	0–2
Al-Dahab	3–0		1–0	1–0	2–0	1–2	4–0	0–1	0–0	3–2
Al-Ghazwa	1–0	1–1		2–0	1–1	3–1	2–0	0–3	2–0	2–0
Al-Nakhal	1–4	2–3	0–4		1–1	3–4	1–1	3–5	1–1	1–2
Al-Qwarah	1–2	3–0	2–1	3–1		1–0	6–0	3–0	4–0	3–0
Blue Star	1–1	1–4	7–2	0–1	1–3		2–1	0–0	3–0	0–0
Haql	0–2	0–0	0–2	2–3	2–3	2–3		1–3	0–1	0–3
Muhayil	0–0	1–1	2–1	2–0	1–1	3–2	2–1		2–1	3–1
Qaryah Al-Ulya	0–2	0–2	2–0	3–0	1–2	1–4	3–2	2–2		0–2
Sharurah	2–2	0–0	3–0	1–2	0–2	1–4	0–3	3–3	1–2	

Updated to match(es) played on 27 February 2026. Source: saff.com.sa
Legend: Blue = home team win; Yellow = draw; Red = away team win.
For upcoming matches, an "a" indicates there is an article about the rivalry between the two participants.

== Play-offs ==
=== Championship play-offs ===
==== Semi-finals ====
6 March 2026
22:00 UTC+3

Al-Qwarah	2–0	Al-Hada
Abalkhail 20', 77'

Al-Qwarah Club Stadium, Al Qwarah
7 March 2026
23:00 UTC+3

Qilwah	1–0	Baish
Al-Yajizi 63'

Qilwah Club Stadium, Qilwah

==== Final ====
12 March 2026
22:00 UTC+3

Al-Qwarah	1–0	Qilwah
Al-Obaid 57'	Report

Al-Raed Club Stadium, Buraidah
Referee: Sami Al-Jaloud

== Statistics ==
=== Top scorers ===
As of 12 March 2026

Rank	Player	Club	Goals
1	(Saudi Arabia) Mohammed Al-Mutairi	Al-Dahab	14
1	(Saudi Arabia) Abdullah Abalkhail	Al-Qwarah	14
3	(Saudi Arabia) Faisal Al-Salbi	Muhayil	10
3	(Saudi Arabia) Ali Al-Enezi	Al-Watani	10
3	(Saudi Arabia) Ammar Al-Amri	Al-Fao	10
6	(Saudi Arabia) Fahad Hadl	Al-Qaisumah	9
6	(Saudi Arabia) Abdullateef Al-Huraiji	Al-Qaisumah	9
8	(Saudi Arabia) Jaber Asiri	Al-Ansar	8
8	(Saudi Arabia) Jassem Al-Hamdan	Al-Hada	8
8	(Saudi Arabia) Hassan Kirbas	Al-Hada	8

==== Hat-tricks ====
Player	For	Against	Result	Date	Ref.
(Saudi Arabia) Meshari Al-Qahtani	Al-Maseef	Al-Yarmouk	6–1 (H)	15 November 2025	
(Saudi Arabia) Ali Al-Enezi	Al-Watani	Al-Bateen	5–3 (H)	15 November 2025	
(Saudi Arabia) Mohammed Al-Dhefiri	Blue Star	Al-Ghazwa	7–2 (H)	6 December 2025	
(Saudi Arabia) Faisal Al-Salbi^{5}	Muhayil	Al-Nakhal	5–3 (A)	23 January 2026	
(Saudi Arabia) Faisal Al-Salbi	Muhayil	Haql	3–1 (A)	7 February 2026	
(Saudi Arabia) Abdullah Abalkhail	Al-Qwarah	Al-Dahab	3–0 (H)	13 February 2026	
(Saudi Arabia) Sultan Al-Suraihi	Al-Ansar	Haql	3–0 (H)	13 February 2026	
(Saudi Arabia) Mukhtar Al-Qanbar	Al-Omran	Al-Selmiyah	3–2 (H)	19 February 2026	
(Saudi Arabia) Fahad Hadl^{4}	Al-Qaisumah	Al-Asyah	5–2 (A)	21 February 2026	
(Saudi Arabia) Osama Al-Sharari	Al-Nakhal	Blue Star	3–4 (H)	23 February 2026	
(Saudi Arabia) Abdullateef Al-Huraiji^{4}	Al-Qaisumah	Al-Khaldi	4–1 (H)	27 February 2026	

Note

(H) – Home; (A) – Away
^{4} Player scored 4 goals; ^{5} Player scored 5 goals

== Number of teams by province ==
Rank	Province	Number	Teams
1	Eastern Province	10	Al-Alamin, Al-Fadhl, Al-Hada, Al-Nahda, Al-Noor, Al-Omran, Al-Qaisumah, Al-Qarah, Blue Star, and Qaryah Al-Ulya
2	Riyadh	9	Al-Bateen, Al-Dera'a, Al-Eetemad, Al-Fao, Al-Mehmal, Al-Muzahimiyyah, Al-Selmiyah, Al-Shaeib, and Sajer
3	Medina	5	Al-Ansar, Al-Dahab, Al-Ghazwa, Al-Nakhal, and Radwa
4	Al-Qassim	4	Al-Asyah, Al-Hilaliyah, Al-Qwarah, and Al-Taqadom
4	Tabuk	4	Al-Houra, Al-Khaldi, Al-Watani, and Haql
6	Jazan	3	Al-Tuhami, Al-Yarmouk and Baish
7	Asir	2	Al-Maseef and Muhayil
8	Al-Bahah	1	Qilwah
8	Mecca	1	Munief
8	Najran	1	Sharurah

== See also ==
- 2025–26 Saudi Pro League
- 2025–26 Saudi First Division League
- 2025–26 Saudi Second Division League
