= 2022–23 Saudi Third Division =

2nd season of the Saudi Third Division

Saudi Third Division
- Season: 2022–23
- Dates: 3 November 2022 – 10 March 2023
- Champions: Mudhar (1st title)
- Promoted: Mudhar; Al-Noor; Al-Jubail; Afif; Al-Houra; Al-Nojoom
- Relegated: Ras Tanura; Al-Hejaz; Al-Waseel; Al-Sawari
- Matches: 231
- Goals: 572 (2.48 per match)
- Top goalscorer: Abdulaziz Al-Merdasi (12 goals)
- Biggest home win: Al-Qala 7–0 Al-Sawari (20 January 2023)
- Biggest away win: Al-Sawari 1–9 Al-Nojoom (10 February 2023)
- Highest scoring: Al-Sawari 1–9 Al-Nojoom (10 February 2023)
- Longest winning run: Al-Noor; Al-Watani; Mudhar (5 matches)
- Longest unbeaten run: Mudhar (16 matches)
- Longest winless run: Al-Sawari (14 matches)
- Longest losing run: Al-Waseel (7 matches)
- All statistics correct as of 10 March 2023.

The 2022–23 Saudi Third Division was the second season of the Saudi Third Division since its inception in 2021. The season started on 3 November 2022 and concluded with the final on 10 March 2023. The group stage draw was held on 8 June 2022.

The final was played on 10 March 2023 between Al-Noor and Mudhar. Mudhar defeated Al-Noor 1–0 to win their first title.

== Overview ==
=== Changes ===
On 14 April 2022, the Saudi FF announced that the number of teams in the Third Division would increase from 32 to 40 teams. To prepare for this change, only 4 teams would be relegated to the Fourth Division and 14 teams would be promoted to the Third Division. In addition, 6 teams would be promoted to the Second Division and only 4 would be relegated from the Second Division.

== Team changes ==
A total of 32 teams are contesting the league, including 22 sides from the 2021–22 season, 4 relegated teams from the Second Division, and 6 promoted teams from the Fourth Division.

=== To Third Division ===
Promoted from the Fourth Division

- Al-Khaldi
- Al-Tasamoh
- Al-Sawari
- Al-Waseel
- Al-Tuhami
- Ras Tanura

Relegated from Second Division

- Al-Dahab
- Afif
- Al-Nojoom
- Al-Thoqbah

=== From Third Division ===
Promoted to Second Division

- Al-Suqoor
- Al-Qous
- Jerash
- Sajer
- Qilwah
- Al-Shaeib

Relegated to the Fourth Division

- Al-Fursan
- Kumait
- Al-Entelaq
- Al-Fao

== Teams ==
;Group A

Locations of teams in the 2022–23 Saudi Third Division Group A

Club	Location	Stadium
Al-Bateen	Dhurma	Al-Bateen Club Stadium
Al-Dahab	Mahd adh Dhahab	Ohod Club Stadium (Medina)
Al-Jubail	Jubail	Al-Jubail Club Stadium
Al-Omran	Al-Hasa (Al-Omran)	Hajer Club Stadium
Al-Selmiyah	Al-Salamiyah	Al-Anwar Club Stadium (Hotat Bani Tamim)
Al-Ula	Al-'Ula	Al-Ansar Club Stadium (Medina)
Al-Waseel	Al-Uyayna	Irqah Sports Stadium (Riyadh)
Al-Watani	Tabuk	King Khalid Sport City Stadium

Group B

Locations of teams in the 2022–23 Saudi Third Division Group B

Club	Location	Stadium
Al-Anwar	Hotat Bani Tamim	Al-Anwar Club Stadium
Al-Dera'a	Dawadmi	Al-Dera'a Club Stadium
Al-Mujazzal	Al Majma'ah	Al-Hamadah Club Stadium (Al-Ghat)
Al-Nojoom	Al-Hasa (Al-Shuqaiq)	Prince Abdullah bin Jalawi Reserve Stadium
Al-Noor	Sanabes	Prince Nayef bin Abdulaziz Stadium (Qatif)
Al-Qala	Sakakah	Al-Qala Club Stadium
Al-Sawari	Farasan Island	King Faisal Sport City Stadium (Jizan)
Baish	Baish	Baish Club Stadium

Group C

Locations of teams in the 2022–23 Saudi Third Division Group C

Club	Location	Stadium
Al-Houra	Umluj	Al-Houra Club Stadium
Al-Khaldi	Al Wajh	Al-Khaldi Club Stadium
Al-Qawarah	Al Quwarah	Al-Qawarah Club Stadium
Muhayil	Muhayil	Muhayil Club Stadium
Al-Thoqbah	Khobar	Prince Nayef bin Abdulaziz Stadium (Qatif)
Mudhar	Qatif	Prince Nayef bin Abdulaziz Stadium
Ras Tanura	Ras Tanura	Ras Tanura Club Stadium
Sharurah	Sharurah	Sharurah Club Stadium

Group D

Locations of teams in the 2021–22 Saudi Third Division Group D

Club	Location	Stadium
Afif	Afif	Al-Dera'a Club Stadium (Dawadmi)
Al-Amjad	Sabya	King Faisal Sport City Stadium (Jizan)
Al-Ghottah	Mawqaq	Al-Jabalain Club Stadium (Ha'il)
Al-Hejaz	Baljurashi	King Saud Sport City Stadium (Al Bahah)
Al-Tasamoh	Al Qunfudhah	Department of Education Stadium
Al-Tuhami	Jizan	King Faisal Sport City Stadium
Qaryah Al-Ulya	Qaryat al-Ulya	Qaryah Al-Ulya Club Stadium
Radwa	Yanbu	Al-Majd Club Stadium

== Group A ==
=== League table ===
Pos	Team	Pld	W	D	L	GF	GA	GD	Pts	Promotion, qualification or relegation
1	Al-Jubail (P)	14	9	3	2	24	10	+14	30	Promotion to the Second Division and qualification to the Semi-finals
2	Al-Watani	14	8	3	3	22	11	+11	27	Qualification for the promotion play-offs
3	Al-Bateen	14	6	7	1	20	15	+5	25	
4	Al-Ula	14	6	3	5	17	18	−1	21	
5	Al-Dahab	14	6	2	6	22	22	0	20	
6	Al-Omran	14	4	4	6	13	16	−3	16	
7	Al-Selmiyah	14	3	3	8	11	21	−10	12	
8	Al-Waseel (R)	14	1	1	12	12	28	−16	4	Relegation to the Fourth Division

Updated to match(es) played on 23 February 2023. Source:
Rules for classification: 1) Points; 2) Head-to-Head points; 3) Head-to-Head goal difference; 4) Head-to-Head goals scored; 5) Total goal difference; 6) Total goals scored; 7) Play-off (only for deciding champion, promotion and relegation).
(P) Promoted; (R) Relegated

=== Results ===
Home \ Away	BAT	DAH	JUB	OMR	SEL	ULA	WAS	WAT
Al-Bateen		1–1	1–1	1–1	2–1	2–2	1–0	1–0
Al-Dahab	1–3		5–2	2–1	1–2	3–0	3–1	1–1
Al-Jubail	0–0	3–1		5–0	2–0	2–0	3–1	1–0
Al-Omran	1–1	3–0	0–1		2–1	0–1	2–0	1–1
Al-Selmiyah	0–1	0–2	0–0	2–0		0–2	1–0	1–1
Al-Ula	4–2	2–0	0–1	0–0	2–2		2–1	0–2
Al-Waseel	2–2	1–2	0–2	0–2	4–1	0–1		1–2
Al-Watani	1–2	2–0	2–1	1–0	2–0	3–1	4–1	

Updated to match(es) played on 23 February 2023. Source: kooora.com
Legend: Blue = home team win; Yellow = draw; Red = away team win.
For upcoming matches, an "a" indicates there is an article about the rivalry between the two participants.

== Group B ==
=== League table ===
Pos	Team	Pld	W	D	L	GF	GA	GD	Pts	Promotion, qualification or relegation
1	Al-Noor (P)	14	9	3	2	19	5	+14	30	Promotion to the Second Division and qualification to the Semi-finals
2	Al-Nojoom (P)	14	8	2	4	23	9	+14	26	Qualification for the promotion play-offs
3	Baish	14	7	4	3	18	14	+4	25	
4	Al-Qala	14	7	3	4	23	12	+11	24	
5	Al-Anwar	14	3	8	3	8	8	0	17	
6	Al-Dera'a	14	4	4	6	19	16	+3	16	
7	Al-Mujazzal	14	3	4	7	12	20	−8	13	
8	Al-Sawari (R)	14	0	2	12	8	46	−38	2	Relegation to the Fourth Division

Updated to match(es) played on 24 February 2023. Source:
Rules for classification: 1) Points; 2) Head-to-Head points; 3) Head-to-Head goal difference; 4) Head-to-Head goals scored; 5) Total goal difference; 6) Total goals scored; 7) Play-off (only for deciding champion, promotion and relegation).
(P) Promoted; (R) Relegated

=== Results ===
Home \ Away	ANW	DER	MUJ	NOJ	NOR	QAL	SAW	BAI
Al-Anwar		1–0	1–1	0–0	0–1	0–0	0–0	2–0
Al-Dera'a	0–0		3–0	1–1	0–1	2–0	4–1	2–2
Al-Mujazzal	0–0	1–1		0–2	0–3	0–1	2–0	2–2
Al-Nojoom	0–1	3–1	1–0		1–0	1–0	2–0	1–2
Al-Noor	0–0	2–0	1–0	1–0		1–0	3–0	1–2
Al-Qala	2–0	2–1	3–2	1–2	1–1		7–0	2–0
Al-Sawari	2–2	0–3	2–3	1–9	1–4	1–3		0–1
Baish	2–1	2–1	0–1	1–0	0–0	1–1	3–0	

Updated to match(es) played on 24 February 2023. Source: kooora.com
Legend: Blue = home team win; Yellow = draw; Red = away team win.
For upcoming matches, an "a" indicates there is an article about the rivalry between the two participants.

== Group C ==
=== League table ===
Pos	Team	Pld	W	D	L	GF	GA	GD	Pts	Promotion, qualification or relegation
1	Mudhar (C, P)	14	8	6	0	23	5	+18	30	Promotion to the Second Division and qualification to the Semi-finals
2	Al-Houra (P)	14	8	5	1	22	10	+12	29	Qualification for the promotion play-offs
3	Sharurah	14	4	6	4	20	22	−2	18	
4	Muhayil	14	3	6	5	18	20	−2	15	
5	Al-Khaldi	14	4	3	7	19	25	−6	15	
6	Al-Qawarah	14	2	8	4	14	18	−4	14	
7	Al-Thoqbah	14	2	7	5	13	13	0	13	
8	Ras Tanura (R)	14	3	3	8	12	28	−16	12	Relegation to the Fourth Division

Updated to match(es) played on 25 February 2023. Source:
Rules for classification: 1) Points; 2) Head-to-Head points; 3) Head-to-Head goal difference; 4) Head-to-Head goals scored; 5) Total goal difference; 6) Total goals scored; 7) Play-off (only for deciding champion, promotion and relegation).
(C) Champions; (P) Promoted; (R) Relegated

=== Results ===
Home \ Away	HOU	KHA	QAW	THO	MUD	MUH	RAS	SHR
Al-Houra		3–0	3–2	2–0	0–0	1–0	2–1	4–0
Al-Khaldi	0–0		2–4	2–1	1–2	1–0	3–1	4–3
Al-Qawarah	0–1	2–1		0–0	0–2	1–1	0–0	2–2
Al-Thoqbah	1–1	3–3	0–0		0–0	1–2	3–0	0–0
Mudhar	1–1	1–0	3–0	1–0		1–1	6–0	3–0
Muhayil	1–1	3–1	0–0	1–1	2–2		3–0	2–5
Ras Tanura	3–1	1–0	2–2	0–3	0–1	2–1		1–2
Sharurah	1–2	1–1	1–1	1–0	0–0	3–1	1–1	

Updated to match(es) played on 25 February 2023. Source: kooora.com
Legend: Blue = home team win; Yellow = draw; Red = away team win.
For upcoming matches, an "a" indicates there is an article about the rivalry between the two participants.

== Group D ==
=== League table ===
Pos	Team	Pld	W	D	L	GF	GA	GD	Pts	Promotion, qualification or relegation
1	Afif (P)	14	7	4	3	27	14	+13	25	Promotion to the Second Division and qualification to the Semi-finals
2	Al-Ghottah	14	6	6	2	27	15	+12	24	Qualification for the promotion play-offs
3	Al-Tuhami	14	5	7	2	23	21	+2	22	
4	Qaryah Al-Ulya	14	5	5	4	11	12	−1	20	
5	Radwa	14	4	4	6	18	21	−3	16	
6	Al-Tasamoh	14	4	3	7	17	29	−12	15	
7	Al-Amjad	14	2	8	4	11	15	−4	14	
8	Al-Hejaz (R)	14	2	5	7	11	18	−7	11	Relegation to the Fourth Division

Updated to match(es) played on 25 February 2023. Source:
Rules for classification: 1) Points; 2) Head-to-Head points; 3) Head-to-Head goal difference; 4) Head-to-Head goals scored; 5) Total goal difference; 6) Total goals scored; 7) Play-off (only for deciding champion, promotion and relegation).
(P) Promoted; (R) Relegated

=== Results ===
Home \ Away	AFI	AMJ	GHO	HEJ	TAS	TUH	QAR	RAD
Afif		1–0	0–0	2–1	4–0	6–1	1–0	2–2
Al-Amjad	0–2		0–0	2–0	4–1	1–1	1–2	1–1
Al-Ghottah	2–1	5–0		1–1	7–1	1–1	1–1	0–2
Al-Hejaz	0–0	0–0	2–4		1–0	0–0	0–1	2–1
Al-Tasamoh	3–2	0–0	2–3	2–1		2–2	1–2	2–0
Al-Tuhami	3–1	1–1	3–1	2–2	2–1		3–0	2–1
Qaryah Al-Ulya	0–0	0–0	0–0	1–0	0–1	2–2		1–0
Radwa	2–5	1–1	1–2	2–1	1–1	2–0	2–1	

Updated to match(es) played on 25 February 2023. Source: kooora.com
Legend: Blue = home team win; Yellow = draw; Red = away team win.
For upcoming matches, an "a" indicates there is an article about the rivalry between the two participants.

== Play-offs ==
=== Championship play-offs ===
==== Semi-finals ====
4 March 2023
15:30 UTC+3

Al-Jubail	0–1	Al-Noor
		Al-Shehri 60'

Al-Jubail Club Stadium, Jubail
4 March 2023
15:30 UTC+3

Mudhar	3–3	Afif
Dagriri 25'; Al-Jassem 68'; Al-Sultan 90+8'		Eid 11', 20'; Al-Suwait 45'
Penalties
Al-Jassem (penalty scored); Al-Sultan (penalty scored); Abdullatif (penalty scored); Al-Shuhaib (penalty scored); Boeissa (penalty scored)	5–3	(penalty scored) Hawsawi; (penalty scored) Al-Qurashi; (penalty scored) Al-Amri; (penalty missed) Monaja

Prince Nayef bin Abdulaziz Stadium, Qatif

==== Final ====
10 March 2023
18:20 UTC+3

Mudhar	1–0	Al-Noor
Abdullatif 40'	Report

Prince Nayef bin Abdulaziz Stadium, Qatif
Referee: Yousef Al-Ahmari

=== Promotion play-offs ===
Team 1	Agg.	Team 2	1st leg	2nd leg
Al-Nojoom	2–1	Al-Watani	1–0	1–1
Al-Ghottah	2–2 (2–4 p)	Al-Houra	2–1	0–1

4 March 2023
15:30 UTC+3

Al-Nojoom	1–0	Al-Watani
Al-Nakhli 72'

Hajer Club Stadium, Al-Hasa
10 March 2023
16:00 UTC+3

Al-Watani	1–1	Al-Nojoom
Al-Enezi 40'		Al-Shehri 30'

King Khalid Sport City Stadium, Tabuk

Al-Nojoom won 2–1 on aggregate.

4 March 2023
16:00 UTC+3

Al-Ghottah	2–1	Al-Houra
Hawsawi 27', 83'		Al-Goufi 88'

Al-Jabalain Club Stadium, Ha'il
10 March 2023
15:00 UTC+3

Al-Houra	1–0	Al-Ghottah
Al-Zahrani 70'	Report
Penalties
Al-Hamdi (penalty scored); Al-Zahrani (penalty scored); Al-Johani (penalty scored); Al-Zubaidi (penalty scored)	4–2	(penalty missed) Nowman; (penalty scored) Hazazi; (penalty missed) Al-Shammari; (penalty scored) Al-Shaye

Al-Houra Club Stadium, Umluj

2–2 on aggregate. Al-Houra won 4–2 on penalties.

== Statistics ==
=== Top scorers ===
As of 10 March 2023

Rank	Player	Club	Goals
1	(Saudi Arabia) Abdulaziz Al-Merdasi	Afif	12
2	(Saudi Arabia) Saud Fallatah	Al-Dera'a	10
2	(Saudi Arabia) Emad Al-Kanani	Al-Ula	10
4	(Saudi Arabia) Meshal Nowman	Al-Ghotah	9
5	(Saudi Arabia) Naif Abdali	Baish	8
6	(Saudi Arabia) Abdullah Al-Ghamdi	Muhayil	7
6	(Saudi Arabia) Mabrook Al-Najrani	Sharurah	7
6	(Saudi Arabia) Nawaf Al-Muslamani	Al-Khaldi	7
6	(Saudi Arabia) Basem Al-Enezi	Al-Watani	7
6	(Saudi Arabia) Abdulrahman Al-Goufi	Al-Houra	7

==== Hat-tricks ====
Player	For	Against	Result	Date	Ref.
(Saudi Arabia) Yousef Al-Salem	Al-Jubail	Al-Omran	5–0 (H)	4 November 2022	
(Saudi Arabia) Saud Fallatah	Al-Dera'a	Al-Sawari	4–1 (H)	18 November 2022	
(Saudi Arabia) Abdullah Al-Ghamdi	Muhayil	Ras Tanura	3–0 (H)	19 November 2022	
(Saudi Arabia) Abdulaziz Al-Merdasi	Afif	Al-Tuhami	6–1 (H)	9 December 2022	
(Saudi Arabia) Yahya Asiri	Sharurah	Muhayil	5–2 (A)	9 December 2022	
(Saudi Arabia) Saad Al-Shammari	Al-Ghottah	Al-Tasamoh	3–2 (A)	16 December 2022	
(Saudi Arabia) Abdulaziz Al-Merdasi	Afif	Al-Tasamoh	4–0 (H)	21 January 2023	
(Saudi Arabia) Basem Al-Enezi	Al-Watani	Al-Ula	3–1 (H)	4 February 2023	
(Saudi Arabia) Abdulaziz Al-Shammari	Al-Qawarah	Al-Khaldi	4–2 (A)	10 February 2023	
(Saudi Arabia) Musaab Al-Rashdan	Al-Ghottah	Al-Tasamoh	7–1 (H)	17 February 2023	
(Saudi Arabia) Salamah Al-Omrani	Al-Watani	Al-Waseel	4–1 (H)	23 February 2023	

Note

(H) – Home; (A) – Away

== Number of teams by province ==
Rank	Province	Number	Teams
1	Eastern Province	8	Al-Jubail, Al-Nojoom, Al-Noor, Al-Omran, Al-Thoqbah, Mudhar, Qaryah Al-Ulya and Ras Tanura
2	Riyadh	7	Afif, Al-Anwar, Al-Bateen, Al-Dera'a, Al-Mujazzal, Al-Selmiyah and Al-Waseel
3	Jazan	4	Al-Amjad, Al-Sawari, Al-Tuhami and Baish
4	Medina	3	Al-Dahab, Al-Ula and Radwa
4	Tabuk	3	Al-Houra, Al-Khaldi and Al-Watani
6	Al-Bahah	1	Al-Hejaz
6	Al Jawf	1	Al-Qala
6	Al-Qassim	1	Al-Qawarah
6	Asir	1	Muhayil
6	Ha'il	1	Al-Ghottah
6	Mecca	1	Al-Tasamoh
6	Najran	1	Sharurah

== See also ==
- 2022–23 Saudi Professional League
- 2022–23 Saudi First Division League
- 2022–23 Saudi Second Division
