= Fawaz Al-Khaibari =

Saudi Arabian footballer

Personal information
- Full name: Fawaz Saleh Al-Khaibari
- Date of birth: January 6, 1992 (age 34)
- Place of birth: Madina, Saudi Arabia
- Height: 1.86 m (6 ft 1 in)
- Position: Goalkeeper

Team information
- Current team: Al-Dahab
- Number: 90

Youth career
- 2007–2009: Al-Ansar
- 2009–2012: Al-Ittihad

Senior career*
Years	Team	Apps	(Gls)
2012–2015	Al-Ittihad	1	(0)
2016–2017	Al-Hazem		
2018–2019	Al-Majd		
2019	Al-Ghazwa		
2019–2020	Al-Riyadh		
2021–2023	Al-Dera'a		
2023–2024	Al-Tuhami		
2025–	Al-Dahab		

International career
2012	Saudi Arabia	3	(0)
- * Club domestic league appearances and goals

Fawaz Saleh Al-Khaibari (Arabic: فواز الخيبري; born January 6, 1992) is a Saudi Arabian international footballer who plays for Al-Dahab as a goalkeeper.
