= Ghallab Al-Enezi =

Saudi Arabian association football player

Ghallab Al-Enezi غلاب العنزي
Personal information
- Full name: Ghallab Mohammed Al-Enezi
- Date of birth: 13 June 1999 (age 27)
- Place of birth: Saudi Arabia
- Position: Midfielder

Team information
- Current team: Al-Motawaa

Youth career
- –2019: Al-Shabab

Senior career*
Years	Team	Apps	(Gls)
2019–2022	Al-Hazem	2	(0)
2021	→ Al-Shoulla (loan)	17	(2)
2021–2022	→ Al-Jabalain (loan)	20	(1)
2022–2023	Al-Shoulla	29	(1)
2023–2024	Al-Ula	9	(1)
2025	Al-Tuhami		
2025–	Al-Motawaa		

International career
2017–2018	Saudi Arabia U20		
- * Club domestic league appearances and goals

Ghallab Al-Enezi (Arabic: غلاب العنزي, born 13 June 1999) is a Saudi Arabian professional footballer who plays as a midfielder for Al-Motawaa.

== Career ==
Al-Enezi began his career at the youth team of Al-Shabab. He arrived for the first team in 2019. On 9 August 2019, Al-Enezi signed a three-year contract with Al-Hazem.

On 16 August 2021, Al-Enezi joined Al-Jabalain on loan until the end of the 2021–22 season. On 16 July 2022, Al-Enezi joined Al-Shoulla on a free transfer. On 8 August 2023, Al-Enezi joined Al-Ula. In January 2025, Al-Enezi joined Al-Tuhami.

== Honours ==
=== Club ===
Al-Ula

- Saudi Third Division: 2023–24
