= Thaar Al-Otaibi =

Saudi association football player

Thaar Al-Otaibi ذعار العتيبي
Personal information
- Full name: Thaar Hussain Al-Otaibi
- Date of birth: 14 August 1999 (age 27)
- Place of birth: Riyadh, Saudi Arabia
- Height: 1.72 m (5 ft 8 in)
- Position: Winger

Team information
- Current team: Al-Zulfi (on loan from Al-Ula)
- Number: 11

Youth career
- -2019: Al-Hilal

Senior career*
Years	Team	Apps	(Gls)
2019–2021	Al-Hilal	1	(0)
2020	→ Al-Taawoun (loan)	5	(0)
2020–2021	→ Abha (loan)	5	(0)
2021–2023	Al-Hazem	40	(4)
2023–2024	Ohod	11	(1)
2024–	Al-Ula	29	(4)
2025–	→ Al-Zulfi (loan)	0	(0)

International career
2022	Saudi Arabia U23		
- * Club domestic league appearances and goals

Thaar Al-Otaibi (Arabic: ذعار العتيبي; born 25 August 1999) is a Saudi Arabian professional footballer who plays for Al-Zulfi on loan from Al-Ula as a winger.

== Career ==
Al-Otaibi began his career at the youth team of Al-Hilal. He signed a one-year contract with the option to extend for a further on 3 August 2019. On 3 November 2019, Al-Otaibi made his professional debut for Al-Hilal against Arar in the King Cup match, replacing Saleh Al-Shehri in the 63rd minute. On 28 January 2020, Al-Otaibi renewed his contract with Al-Hilal for a further two years and was immediately joined Al-Taawoun on a six-month loan. On 13 October 2020, Al-Otaibi joined Abha on loan. On 15 July 2021, Al-Otaibi joined Al-Hazem on a three-year contract. On 31 August 2023, Al-Otaibi joined Ohod on a three-year deal. On 7 January 2024, Al-Otaibi joined Third Division side Al-Ula. On 8 September 2025, Al-Otaibi joined Al-Zulfi on loan.

== Honours ==
Al-Hazem

- First Division runner-up: 2022–23 (promotion to the Pro League)

Al-Ula

- Saudi Second Division League runner-up: 2024–25 (promotion to the First Division)
- Saudi Third Division: 2023–24
