= Saudi Arabian Women's Volleyball League =

- Current season, competition or edition: 2025–26 Saudi Women's Volleyball League
- Sport: Volleyball
- First season: 2023; 3 years ago
- Administrator: SAVA
- No. of teams: 6 teams
- Country: Saudi Arabia
- Confederation: AVC
- Continent: Asia
- Most recent champion: Al-Ula (1st title) (2025–26)
- Most titles: Al-Nassr VC (2 titles)
- Level on pyramid: Level 1
- Relegation to: National 2
- Domestic cups: Saudi Cup; Saudi Super Cup
- International cups: AVC Champions League; Arab Clubs Championship

The Saudi Arabian Women's Volleyball League ( Arabic : الدوري السعودي لكرة الطائرة للسيدات ) is an annual competition featuring women’s volleyball teams from across Saudi Arabia. It has been held since 2023 and follows an autumn-to-spring season format.

== Competition Format ==
In the 2025/26 season, the Women’s League was played as a double round-robin tournament, with the final standings determined by the results of all matches.

Six teams participated in the 2025/26 championship: Al-Ula, Al-Qadsiah, Al-Zulfi, Al-Fayha, Al-Taraf, and Phoenix SC.

The championship title was won by Al-Ula. Al-Qadsiah finished as runners-up, while Al-Zulfi placed third.

== Winners by Season ==
Season	Champions	Runners-up	Third place
2025/26	Al Ula Club	Al Qadsiah	Al Zulfi
2024/25	Al-Nassr VC	Al Ula Club	Al Qadsiah
2023/24	Al-Nassr VC	Al Ittihad Club	Al Zulfi

Sources :
