= Gusay Al-Shelali =

Saudi Arabian footballer

Personal information
- Full name: Gusay Saad Al-Shelali Al-Khaibari
- Date of birth: February 14, 1992 (age 34)
- Place of birth: Jeddah, Saudi Arabia
- Height: 1.77 m (5 ft 10 in)
- Position: Midfielder

Youth career
- Al-Ittihad

Senior career*
| Years | Team | Apps | (Gls) |
| 2011–2018 | Al-Ittihad | 15 | (0) |
| 2012–2014 | → Beira-Mar (loan) | | |
| 2017 | → Al-Qadsiah (loan) | 0 | (0) |
| 2020 | Jeddah | 7 | (0) |
| 2020–2022 | Ohod | 45 | (0) |
| 2022 | Al-Shoulla | 0 | (0) |
| 2022–2023 | Najran | 13 | (1) |
| 2023 | Al-Qadsiah | 13 | (0) |
| 2023–2025 | Al-Ula | 35 | (1) |
| 2025–2026 | Al-Batin | 11 | (0) |
- * Club domestic league appearances and goals

Gusay Al-Shelali (Arabic: قصي الشلالي; born 14 February 1992) is a Saudi Arabian footballer who plays as a midfielder.

== Honours ==
=== Club ===
Al-Ula

- Saudi Third Division: 2023–24
