= Allan Sousa =

Brazilian footballer (born 1997)

Personal information
- Full name: Allan Gonçalves Sousa
- Date of birth: 27 January 1997 (age 29)
- Place of birth: Registro, São Paulo, Brazil
- Height: 1.75 m (5 ft 9 in)
- Position: Winger

Youth career
- Independente de Limeira

Senior career*
Years	Team	Apps	(Gls)
2016	Al-Arabi	10	(1)
2016–2017	→ Al-Markhiya (loan)	12	(10)
2017–2022	Vejle	123	(32)
2019–2020	→ Sint-Truiden (loan)	23	(0)
2022–2023	AaB	34	(9)
2023–2025	Al-Ula	37	(13)
2025	→ Al-Jubail (loan)	15	(3)
- * Club domestic league appearances and goals as of 11:12, 10 November 2025 (UTC)

Allan Gonçalves Sousa (born 27 January 1997) is a Brazilian professional footballer who plays as a winger.

== Club career ==
=== Early career ===
In winter 2016, at the age of 19, Sousa joined Al Arabi club in the Stars League for half a season 2015–16. The following season he was loaned to Al-Markhiya in the Second Division. Sousa left the team before 5 rounds than end, then moved to Denmark.

=== Vejle Boldklub ===
On 9 February 2017, Vejle Boldklub announced that Sousa had traveled with the team at training camp in Turkey prior to spring in the 2016–2017 season. The club also wrote that Sousa on the 12 day training camp would sign its agreement with the traditional club.

He established himself from the start of the spring season as a starter in the club, but scored first his first Vejlegoal on 7 May, when he delivered a direct free kick to VB at 1–1 home against AB.

In the following 2017–18 season, he scored 9 goals in league and scored up to 8 VB scores in 28 matches. Thus he was a crucial player in Vejle Boldklub's return to Danish Superliga.

He started the 2018–19 season in Superliga by scoring Vejle Boldklub's first goal this season when he put VB ahead of 1–0 in what ended up being a 3–1 victory over Hobro IK. He also followed up in the subsequent two matches against Brøndby IF and AGF, respectively. Prior to the third match in the season against AGF, Sousa extended its contract with VB until summer 2021.

==== Loan to Sint-Truiden ====
On 16 July 2019 it was confirmed, that Sousa had extended his contract with Vejle and would be loaned out to Belgian club Sint-Truidense.

=== Al-Ula ===
On 19 September 2023, Sousa joined Saudi Third Division club Al-Ula. He was signed as part of the club coming under the control of the Royal Commission for Al-'Ula, a state commission under Mohammed bin Salman as part of the Saudi Vision 2030. He signed for an annual salary believed to be €2.5 million. On 21 January 2025, Sousa joined Saudi First Division club Al-Jubail on loan.

== Honours ==
Vejle

- Danish 1st Division: 2017–18

Al-Ula

- Saudi Third Division: 2023–24
