= Muhannad Al-Saad (footballer, born 1989) =

Saudi Arabian footballer

Personal information
- Full name: Muhannad Al-Saad
- Date of birth: January 16, 1989 (age 37)
- Place of birth: Saudi Arabia
- Height: 1.75 m (5 ft 9 in)
- Position: Winger

Youth career
- Al-Shabab

Senior career*
Years	Team	Apps	(Gls)
2009–2013	Al-Qadisiyah		
2013–2014	Al-Faisaly		
2014–2015	Al-Nahda		
2015–2016	Al-Diriyah		
2016–2018	Al-Muzahimiyyah		
- * Club domestic league appearances and goals

Muhannad Al-Saad (Arabic: مهند السعد; born January 16, 1989) is a Saudi football player who plays as a winger.
