= Al-Mehmal Club =

Saudi Arabian football team

Al-Mehmal
- Full name: Al-Mehmal Club
- Founded: 1976
- Ground: Thadig, Saudi Arabia
- League: Saudi Fourth Division
Home colours	Away colours

Al-Mehmal Club is a Saudi Arabian football club based in Thadig. They play in the fourth tier of football in the country, the Saudi Fourth Division.

== Current squad ==
As of Saudi Third Division:

Note: Flags indicate national team as defined under FIFA eligibility rules; some limited exceptions apply. Players may hold more than one non-FIFA nationality.

No.	Pos.	Nation	Player
1	GK	KSA	Mohammed Awaji
3	DF	KSA	Abdulrahman Al-Saeed
4	DF	KSA	Haitham Al-Tammah
6	MF	KSA	Abed Al-Sebiyani
7	MF	KSA	Mohammed Omar
8	MF	KSA	Nawaf Al-Qahtani
9	FW	KSA	Bader Dibaji
10	MF	KSA	Salman Al-Belaikhi
12	DF	KSA	Hassan Raghfawi
14	MF	KSA	Bader Al-Johani
17	DF	KSA	Hamed Absi
18	MF	KSA	Shaher Al-Shibani

No.	Pos.	Nation	Player
21	FW	KSA	Abdullah Hadhereti
22	DF	KSA	Ibrahim Al-Saeed
23	GK	KSA	Alwaleed Al-Obaid
24	DF	KSA	Ali Arishi
26	MF	KSA	Nawaf Al-Shwier
28	MF	KSA	Badr Al-Otaibi
40	DF	KSA	Muteb Al-Mutlaq
90	FW	KSA	Naif Abdali
95	MF	KSA	Rayan Al-Muziel
99	FW	KSA	Abdulrahman Al-Drihim

== Notable players ==
- Omar Al-Muziel
- Mohammed Qassem

== See also ==
- List of football clubs in Saudi Arabia
