= Abdullah Hadhereti =

Saudi Arabian footballer

Abdullah Hadhereti عبدالله حضريتي
Personal information
- Full name: Abdullah Faisal Hadhereti
- Date of birth: 10 August 1992 (age 34)
- Place of birth: Saudi Arabia
- Height: 1.73 m (5 ft 8 in)
- Position: Forward

Team information
- Current team: Al-Mehmal
- Number: 21

Youth career
- –2013: Al-Raed
- 2013–2014: Al-Shabab

Senior career*
Years	Team	Apps	(Gls)
2014–2015	Al-Raed	2	(0)
2015–2016	Damac	3	(0)
2016–2017	Sdoos		
2017–2018	Al-Ain		
2018–2020	Al-Taqadom		
2020	→ Al-Qadsiah (loan)	17	(12)
2020–2022	Al-Qadsiah	4	(0)
2021	→ Al-Jabalain (loan)	14	(3)
2021–2022	→ Al-Jeel (loan)	14	(4)
2022–2023	Al-Adalah	6	(0)
2023	Al-Kholood	14	(2)
2023–2024	Al-Taqadom		
2025–	Al-Mehmal		

International career
- Saudi Arabia U23
- * Club domestic league appearances and goals as of 14 May 2020

Abdullah Hadhereti (Arabic: عبدالله حضريتي; born 10 August 1992) is a Saudi Arabian footballer who plays for Al-Mehmal as a forward.

== Career ==
Hadhereti began his career at the youth team of Al-Raed before joining Al-Shabab on January 31, 2013. On August 13, 2014, he left Al-Shabab and rejoined to Al-Raed. On September 3, 2015, Hadhereti joined Damac. After making 3 appearances in all competitions he left Damac and joined Sdoos on January 1, 2016. Hadhereti left Sdoos and joined Al-Ain on August 8, 2017. He helped Al-Ain achieve promotion to the MS League. On August 24, 2018, Hadhereti joined Al-Taqadom. He scored 14 goals as Al-Taqadom finished fourth and earned promotion to the MS League. On January 12, 2020, Hadhereti joined Al-Qadsiah on a six-month loan. He scored 12 goals in 17 appearances as Al-Qadsiah finished runners-up in the MS League. On 2 February 2021, Hadhereti joined Al-Jabalain on loan from Al-Qadsiah. On 21 July 2022, Hadhereti joined Pro League side Al-Adalah. On 1 January 2023, Hadhereti joined Al-Kholood.
