= Ousmane Barry =

Guinean footballer (born 1991)

Personal information
- Full name: Elhadj Ousmane Barry
- Date of birth: 27 September 1991 (age 35)
- Place of birth: Conakry, Guinea
- Height: 1.70 m (5 ft 7 in)
- Positions: Centre forward; winger

Team information
- Current team: Al-Bukiryah
- Number: 9

Senior career*
Years	Team	Apps	(Gls)
2008–2011	Horoya		
2011–2012	Étoile du Sahel	8	(1)
2012–2013	Tammeka	6	(4)
2013	→ Kavala (loan)	19	(6)
2013	Kecskemét	10	(1)
2013–2015	Panachaiki	11	(5)
2014–2015	→ Agrotikos Asteras (loan)	15	(4)
2015–2016	AEL	17	(1)
2016–2017	Agrotikos Asteras	26	(3)
2018	Al-Hazem	12	(10)
2018–2019	Al-Orobah	17	(3)
2019	Abha	17	(11)
2019–2020	Al-Bukiryah	34	(27)
2020–2021	Al-Hazem	34	(19)
2021–2022	Al-Wehda	14	(3)
2022–2023	Al-Okhdood	32	(22)
2023–2024	Al-Najma	15	(13)
2024–2025	Al-Ula	27	(13)
2025	Al-Okhdood	16	(1)
2025–	Al-Bukiryah		

International career^{‡}
2011–	Guinea	3	(0)
- * Club domestic league appearances and goals as of 20:03, 1 May 2024 (UTC) ‡ National team caps and goals as of 07:02, 30 March 2023 (UTC)

Elhadj Ousmane Barry (born 27 September 1991), also known as Pato, is a Guinean international footballer who plays as a centre forward for Al-Bukiryah.

== Club career ==
Barry has played club football in Guinea and Tunisia for Horoya and Étoile du Sahel.

In July 2012, the player was on trial with JK Tammeka Tartu and signed a contract with the club at the end of the month. Barry made the debut for the team on 29 September, when he was substituted in during the second half and scored his first goal just five minutes later. On 21 October 2012, Pato scored a hat-trick in a relegation battle against JK Tallinna Kalev and helped his team to a 4–1 victory. A few days later he signed a new three-year contract with the club.

In January 2013, he joined Greek side Kavala on loan until the end of the 2012–13 season.

Barry joined Greek club Panachaiki in December 2013 and his contract with the club was extended in September 2014. On 24 July 2015 he signed a 3-years contract and moved to AEL. On 29 June 2016, Pato left the club by mutual agreement.

He moved to Saudi club Al-Hazem in 2018. Later that year he moved to Al-Orobah. In early 2019 he moved to Abha. Later that year he moved to Al-Bukayriyah. On 23 September 2020, Barry joined Al-Hazem. On 17 August 2021, Barry joined Al-Wehda. On 1 July 2022, Barry joined Al-Okhdood. On 7 June 2023, Barry joined newly promoted side Al-Najma.

In January 2024, Barry joined Saudi Third Division side Al-Ula. He scored a hattrick on his debut on 26 January in the 3–2 win against Al-Watani.

On 2 February 2025, Barry joined Saudi Pro League club Al-Okhdood.

On 5 August 2025, Barry joined Al-Bukiryah.

== International career ==
He made his international debut for Guinea in 2011, and participated at the 2012 Africa Cup of Nations.

== Honours ==
=== Club ===
Abha

- MS League: 2018–19

Al-Hazem

- MS League: 2020–21

Al-Ula

- Saudi Third Division: 2023–24

=== Individual ===
- MS League top scorer: 2019–20
