= Mohammed Qassem (footballer, born 1990) =

Saudi Arabian footballer

Personal information
- Full name: Mohammed Qassem Al-Gizani
- Date of birth: October 10, 1990 (age 36)
- Place of birth: Saudi Arabia
- Position: Midfielder

Youth career
- Al-Hilal

Senior career*
Years	Team	Apps	(Gls)
2011–2013	Al-Hilal	0	(0)
2013–2014	Al-Nahda	17	(1)
2014–2015	Ettifaq FC		
2015	Hajer	0	(0)
2015–2016	Al-Qaisumah FC		
2016–2017	Al-Diriyah		
2017–2022	Al-Mehmal		
- * Club domestic league appearances and goals

Mohammed Qassem (Arabic: محمد قاسم; born October 10, 1990) is a Saudi football player who plays a midfielder.
