= Saudi football league system =

- Country: Saudi Arabia
- Sport: Association football
- Promotion and relegation: Yes

National system
- Federation: Saudi Arabian Football Federation
- Confederation: AFC
- Top division: Men: Pro League; Women: Women's Premier League
- Second division: Men: First Division League; Women: Women's First Division League
- Cup competition: Men: King's Cup; Super Cup; Women: Women's Cup; Women's Super Cup

The tables below show the current makeup of the Saudi Arabian Football League system. The Saudi Pro League sits at the top of the pyramid and currently three teams get promoted/relegated between the Pro League and the First Division League.

There is also a Second Division League which currently features two groups of sixteen teams where clubs are promoted between this level and the First Division.

SAFF announced a newly created fourth division officially named the Third Division League from 2021, the league features four groups of eight teams where clubs are promoted between this level and the Second Division.

The Saudi Arabian Football Federation announced the launch of new versions of women's football competitions by introducing the Saudi Women's Premier League and Saudi Women's First Division League.

== Current system ==
As of 2024–25 season.

=== Men ===
Level	League(s)/Division(s)			
1	Saudi Pro League; 18 clubs ↓ 3 relegation spots			
2	Saudi First Division League; 18 clubs ↑ 2 promotion spots + 4 promotion play-off spots ↓ 3 relegation spots			
3	Saudi Second Division League; 32 clubs divided into 2 groups ↑ 2 promotion spots + 2 promotion play-off spots ↓ 4 relegation spots			
3	Group A 16 clubs		Group B 16 clubs	
4	Saudi Third Division League; 40 clubs divided into 4 groups ↑ 4 promotion spots ↓ 4 relegation spots			
4	Group A 10 clubs	Group B 10 clubs	Group C 10 clubs	Group D 10 clubs
5	Saudi Fourth Division League (74 clubs) Najran Province League, Jizan Province League, Asir Province League, Al-Bahah Province League, Ha'il Province League, Al-Jouf Province League, Tabuk Province League, Medina Province League, Mecca Province League, Taif Governorate League, Al-Qassim Province League, Ar-Rass Governorate League, Eastern Province Province League, Dammam Province League, Al-Ahsa Province League, Qatif Governorate League, Riyadh Province League, Al-Duwadmi Governorate League, Al-Zulfi Governorate League, Al-Kharj Governorate League, Al-Majma'ah Governorate League.			

=== Women ===
Level	League(s)/Division(s)				
1	Saudi Women's Premier League; 10 clubs				
2	Saudi Women's First Division League; 10 clubs				
3	Saudi Women's Second Division League; 25 clubs divided into 5 groups				
3	Group 1; 6 clubs	Group 2; 5 clubs	Group 3; 4 clubs	Group 4; 4 clubs	Group 5; 6 clubs

== Locations of the teams ==
=== Current Pro League Teams ===
Locations of teams in the 2024–25 Saudi Professional League

=== Stadia ===
Note: Table lists in alphabetical order.

Team	Location	Stadium	Capacity
Al-Ahli	Jeddah	King Abdullah Sports City	60,549
Al-Ettifaq	Dammam	EGO STADIUM	15,000
Al-Fateh	Al-Mubarraz	Al-Fateh Stadium	11,000
Al-Fayha	Al Majma'ah	Al Majma'ah Sports City	6,266
Al-Hilal	Riyadh	Kingdom Arena	26,000
Al-Ittihad	Jeddah	King Abdullah Sports City	60,549
Al-Khaleej	Dammam	Prince Mohamed bin Fahd Stadium	11,500
Al-Kholood	Ar Rass	Al-Hazem Club Stadium	8,000
Al-Nassr	Riyadh	Al-Awwal Park	26,100
Al-Okhdood	Najran	Prince Hathloul bin Abdul Aziz Sports City	12,000
Al-Orobah	Sakakah	Al Jouf University Stadium	8,500
Al-Qadsiah	Dammam	Prince Mohamed bin Fahd Stadium	11,500
Al-Raed	Buraidah	King Abdullah Sport City Stadium	25,000
Al-Riyadh	Riyadh	Prince Faisal bin Fahd Stadium	15,000
Al-Shabab	Riyadh	Al-Shabab Club Stadium	15,000
Al-Taawoun	Buraidah	King Abdullah Sport City Stadium	25,000
Al-Wehda	Mecca	King Abdul Aziz Stadium	38,000
Damac	Khamis Mushait	Damac Club Stadium	5,000

=== Current First Division Teams ===
Locations of teams in the 2024–25 First Division League

Note: Table lists in alphabetical order.

Team	Location	Stadium	Capacity	Head coach
Abha	Abha	Prince Sultan bin Abdul Aziz Stadium	20,000	(Tunisia) Abderrazek Chebbi
Al-Adalah	Al-Hasa	Prince Abdullah bin Jalawi Stadium; Hajer Club Stadium	19,099; 12,000	(Slovakia) Martin Ševela
Al-Ain	Al Atawlah	King Saud Sport City Stadium	10,000	(Algeria) Toufik Rouabah
Al-Arabi	Unaizah	Department of Education Stadium	10,000	(Croatia) Damir Burić
Al-Batin	Hafar al-Batin	Al-Batin Club Stadium	6,000	(Tunisia) Nacif Beyaoui
Al-Bukiryah	Al Bukayriyah	Al-Bukiryah Club Stadium	5,000	(Portugal) Nandinho
Al-Faisaly	Harmah	Al Majma'ah Sports City (Al Majma'ah)	6,266	(Spain) Pablo Franco
Al-Hazem	Ar Rass	Al-Hazem Club Stadium	8,000	(Saudi Arabia) Saleh Al-Mohammadi
Al-Jabalain	Ha'il	Prince Abdul Aziz bin Musa'ed Stadium	12,250	(Portugal) Jorge Mendonça
Al-Jandal	Dumat al-Jandal	Al-Orobah Club Stadium (Sakakah)	7,000	(Saudi Arabia) Ziyad Al-Afar
Al-Jubail	Jubail	Al-Jubail Club Stadium	3,000	(Bosnia and Herzegovina) Darko Nestorović
Al-Najma	Unaizah	Department of Education Stadium; Al-Najma Club Stadium	10,000; 7,000	(Portugal) Mário Silva
Al-Safa	Safwa	Al-Safa Club Stadium; Prince Saud bin Jalawi Stadium (Khobar); Prince Mohamed bin Fahd Stadium (Dammam)	3,500; 15,000; 22,042	(Argentina) Juan Brown
Al-Tai	Ha'il	Prince Abdul Aziz bin Musa'ed Stadium	12,000	(Tunisia) Mohamed Kouki
Al-Zulfi	Al Zulfi	Al-Zulfi Club Stadium	3,080	(Serbia) Zoran Milinković
Jeddah	Jeddah	Prince Abdullah Al-Faisal Stadium; Sports Hall at King Abdullah Sports City	27,000; 1,250	(Spain) Iván Carrasco
Neom	Tabuk	King Khalid Sport City Stadium	12,000	(Brazil) Péricles Chamusca
Ohod	Medina	Ohod Club Stadium	5,000	(Saudi Arabia) Yousef Anbar

=== Current Second Division Teams ===
Group A

Locations of teams in the 2024–25 Saudi Second Division Group A

Club	Location	Stadium
Al-Ansar	Medina	Al-Ansar Club Stadium
Al-Ghottah	Mawqaq	Al-Jabalain Club Stadium (Ha'il)
Al-Houra	Umluj	Al-Houra Club Stadium
Al-Jeel	Al-Hasa (Hofuf)	Prince Abdullah bin Jalawi Stadium
Al-Kawkab	Al-Kharj	Al-Shoulla Club Stadium
Al-Lewaa	Baqaa	Al-Lewaa Club Stadium
Al-Nojoom	Al-Hasa (Al-Shuqaiq)	Prince Abdullah bin Jalawi Stadium
Al-Sahel	Qatif	Prince Nayef bin Abdulaziz Stadium
Al-Shoulla	Al-Kharj	Al-Shoulla Club Stadium
Al-Taraji	Qatif	Prince Nayef bin Abdulaziz Stadium
Al-Ula	Al-'Ula	Al-Ansar Club Stadium (Medina)
Arar	Arar	Prince Abdullah bin Abdulaziz bin Musa'ed Sport City Stadium
Bisha	Bisha	Bisha University Stadium
Hajer	Al-Hasa (Hofuf)	Hajer Club Stadium
Mudhar	Qatif	Prince Nayef bin Abdulaziz Stadium
Najran	Najran	Prince Hathloul bin Abdul Aziz Sport City Stadium

Group B

Locations of teams in the 2024–25 Saudi Second Division Group B

Club	Location	Stadium
Al-Anwar	Hotat Bani Tamim	Al-Anwar Club Stadium
Al-Diriyah	Diriyah	Al-Diriyah Club Stadium
Al-Entesar	Rabigh	Al-Entesar Club Stadium
Al-Qaisumah	Qaisumah	Al-Batin Club Stadium (Hafar al-Batin)
Al-Qous	Al Khurmah	Al-Qous Club Stadium
Al-Rawdhah	Al-Hasa (Al-Jeshah)	Al-Rawdhah Club Stadium
Al-Rayyan	Haʼil	Al-Jabalain Club Stadium
Al-Sadd	Ad-Dilam (Najaan)	Al-Anwar Club Stadium (Hotat Bani Tamim)
Al-Saqer	Buraidah (Al-Basr)	Al-Taawoun Club Stadium
Al-Sharq	Ad-Dilam	Al-Shoulla Club Stadium (Al-Kharj)
Al-Taqadom	Al Mithnab	Al-Taqadom Club Stadium
Al-Washm	Shaqra	Al-Washm Club Stadium
Hetten	Samtah	King Faisal Sport City Stadium (Jizan)
Jerash	Ahad Rafidah	Prince Sultan bin Abdul Aziz Reserve Stadium (Abha)
Tuwaiq	Al Zulfi	Al-Zulfi Club Stadium
Wej	Ta'if	King Fahd Stadium
