= Qilwah Club =

Association football club in Saudi Arabia

Qilwah
- Full name: Qilwah Club
- Founded: 27 October 2015; 10 years ago
- Ground: Qilwah Club Stadium, Qilwah
- Chairman: Ali bin Obeid Al-Salahi
- Manager: Tarek Al Banna
- League: Second Division
- 2021–22: Third Division, 5th of 32 (promoted)
Home colours	Away colours

Qilwah Club (Arabic: نادي قلوة) is a Saudi Arabian football club based in Qilwah, Al-Bahah and competes in the Saudi Second Division, the third tier of Saudi football. The club also consists of various other departments including volleyball, weightlifting and table tennis.

The club was founded on 27 October 2014 and its first president was Mousa bin Rashed Al-Zahrani.

Qilwah won their first promotion to the Saudi Second Division during the 2021–22 season after defeating Al-Jubail on penalties in the promotion play-offs.

== History ==
Qilwah was founded on 2015 when the club was officially registered with the General Sports Authority. The club's first president was Mousa bin Rashed Al-Zahrani. Due to Mousa bin Rashed's battle with his illness, Saad Al-Duwaihi, the club's vice-president, was named as interim president. On 25 November 2016, Al-Duwaihi was named as the club's president following the death of Mousa bin Rashed. On 22 June 2016, Qilwah appointed their first ever foreign manager, the Egyptian Sami Abdel Halim. During the 2016–17 season Qilwah competed in the Regional League for the first time in their history. On 12 October 2017, Mousa Al Khudran Al-Zahrani was appointed as Qilwah's president following the resignation of Saad Al-Duwaihi. During the 2018–19 season, Qilwah reached the knockout stages of the Saudi Regional League for the first time in their history after being crowned champions of Al-Bahah Regional League. Qilwah were eliminated by Habouna after losing 5–4 on aggregate in the Round of 32. On 23 October 2019, Ali bin Obeid Al-Salahi was appointed as the president of Qilwah for 4 years.

During the 2020–21 season, Qilwah finished first in the joint Al-Bahah and Mecca Regional League and reached the knockout stages of the Saudi Regional League for the second time in their history. During the Round of 32, Qilwah defeated Al-Omran 2–1 on aggregate before losing to Al-Shaheed in the Round of 16. Following the introduction of the Saudi Third Division, it was announced that Qilwah would be among the teams participating in the league. On 13 August 2021, Qilwah introduced their new club logo and club identity. In their debut season in the fourth tier of Saudi football, Qilwah finished second in their group behind Jerash. Qilwah qualified to the promotion play-offs where they faced Al-Jubail. Qilwah defeated Al-Jubail 8–7 on penalties (0–0 on aggregate) to qualify to the Saudi Second Division for the first time in their history. On 21 July 2022, Tunisian footballer Anis Khedher signed for Qilwah and became the first foreign player to play for the club.

== Current squad ==
As of 30 September 2022:

Note: Flags indicate national team as defined under FIFA eligibility rules; some limited exceptions apply. Players may hold more than one non-FIFA nationality.

No.	Pos.	Nation	Player
1	GK	KSA	Mohammed Al-Zahrani
2	FW	KSA	Radhwan Hawsawi
3	DF	KSA	Ibrahim Al-Jadaani
4	DF	KSA	Jabran Asiri
5	DF	KSA	Wajdi Al-Jaabi
6	MF	KSA	Nawaf Sahari
7	FW	KSA	Waseem Al-Sulami
8	MF	KSA	Mohammed Al-Naami
11	MF	KSA	Abdulaziz Otayf
13	DF	KSA	Abdulraheem Al-Barakati
14	MF	KSA	Ahmed Al-Asmari
15	DF	KSA	Ahmed Al-Nashri
17	MF	KSA	Nader Yajazi
18	DF	KSA	Sulaiman Al-Ghouzi
19	FW	KSA	Talal Mukhtar
20	MF	KSA	Mohammed Majhol

No.	Pos.	Nation	Player
22	GK	KSA	Assem Al-Ghamdi
23	FW	KSA	Ismaeel Al-Hadri
24	DF	KSA	Mohammed Al-Thobaiti
26	GK	KSA	Jaber Al-Jizani
27	MF	KSA	Ahmed Baneamah
28	DF	KSA	Waleed Al-Malki
29	MF	KSA	Nasser Al-Malki
—	MF	KSA	Khaled Al-Zubaidi
—	MF	KSA	Yahya Suror
—	MF	TUN	Yassine Berchani
—	DF	KSA	Wesam Hawsawi
—	MF	KSA	Abdulaziz Al-Zahrani
—	FW	KSA	Ilyas Tareq
—	MF	NGR	Daniel Nosike
—	FW	NGR	Charles Ikechukwu
—	FW	CHA	Maher Sharoumah

== Presidential history ==
As of 1 January 2021.

No	Name	From	To
1	(Saudi Arabia) Mousa bin Rashed Al-Zahrani	2014	2016
2	(Saudi Arabia) Saad Al-Duwaihi	2016	2017
3	(Saudi Arabia) Mousa Al Khudran Al-Zahrani	2017	2019
4	(Saudi Arabia) Ali bin Obeid Al-Salahi	2019

== See also ==
- List of football clubs in Saudi Arabia
