= Al-Ghazwa Club =

Association football club in Saudi Arabia

Al-Ghazwa
- Full name: Al-Ghazwa Club
- Founded: 1979
- Ground: Badr, Al Madinah, Saudi Arabia
- Manager: Mohamed Farouk
- League: Saudi Fourth Division
Home colours	Away colours

Al-Ghazwa Club is a Saudi Arabian football team in Badr City playing at the Saudi Fourth Division.

== Current squad ==
As of Saudi Third Division:

Note: Flags indicate national team as defined under FIFA eligibility rules; some limited exceptions apply. Players may hold more than one non-FIFA nationality.

No.	Pos.	Nation	Player
2	DF	KSA	Mohammed Al-Sobhi
3	FW	KSA	Yahya Al-Absi
4	DF	KSA	Khaled Hawsawi
7	FW	KSA	Marwan Al-Sahafi
8	MF	KSA	Yousef Al-Sayel
9	FW	KSA	Fares Al-Rashidi
10	MF	KSA	Naif Al-Sobhi
11	FW	KSA	Hazem Al-Harbi
13	DF	KSA	Mousa Asiri
16	MF	KSA	Turki Al-Abdali
17	MF	KSA	Ahmed Al-Matshari

No.	Pos.	Nation	Player
19	DF	KSA	Hathal Al-Otaibi
20	MF	KSA	Abdulrahman Al-Khairi
24	FW	KSA	Yahya Ghazwani
30	DF	KSA	Feras Al-Harbi
31	GK	KSA	Abdullah Al-Nakhli
45	MF	KSA	Hattan Al-Nakhli
55	DF	KSA	Abdullah Al-Amri
77	DF	KSA	Abdulrahman Al-Jizani
87	GK	KSA	Osama Al-Hussaini
98	GK	KSA	Saleh Hriji
—	MF	KSA	Rafed Al-Muwallad

== See also ==
- List of football clubs in Saudi Arabia
