= Ahmed Al-Fahmi =

Saudi Arabian footballer

Personal information
- Full name: Ahmed Mefreh Al-Fahmi
- Date of birth: December 12, 1990 (age 35)
- Place of birth: Mecca, Saudi Arabia
- Height: 1.80 m (5 ft 11 in)
- Position: Goalkeeper

Team information
- Current team: Al-Qala
- Number: 40

Youth career
- 2007–2010: Al-Wehda

Senior career*
| Years | Team | Apps | (Gls) |
| 2010–2015 | Al-Wehda | 27 | (0) |
| 2016–2017 | Al-Qaisumah | 7 | (0) |
| 2017–2020 | Al-Qadsiah | 0 | (0) |
| 2018–2019 | → Al-Washm (loan) | 19 | (0) |
| 2019–2020 | → Al-Kawkab (loan) | 3 | (0) |
| 2020–2021 | Al-Kawkab | 0 | (0) |
| 2021–2022 | Al-Arabi | | |
| 2022–2023 | Al-Nairyah | | |
| 2023–2024 | Al-Sahel | | |
| 2024– | Al-Qala | | |
- * Club domestic league appearances and goals as of 5 May 2017

Ahmed Al-Fahmi (Arabic: احمد الفهمي; born 12 December 1990) is a Saudi Arabian footballer who plays for Al-Qala as a goalkeeper.

== Club career statistics ==
| Club | Season | League | | Crown Prince Cup | | King Cup | | ACL | | Other | | Total | |
| Club | Season | Apps | Goals | Apps | Goals | Apps | Goals | Apps | Goals | Apps | Goals | Apps | Goals |
|---|---|---|---|---|---|---|---|---|---|---|---|---|---|
| Al-Wahda | 2010–11 | 3 | - | - | - | 4 | - | - | - | - | - | 7 | - |
| Al-Wahda | 2011–12 | 12 | - | - | - | - | - | - | - | - | - | 12 | - |
| Al-Wahda | Total | 15 | 0 | 0 | 0 | 4 | 0 | 0 | 0 | 0 | 0 | 19 | 0 |
