= Mohamed Ramadan (footballer, born 1990) =

Egyptian footballer

Mohammed Ramadan
Personal information
- Full name: Mohammed Ramadan
- Date of birth: 1 November 1990 (age 35)
- Place of birth: Egypt
- Position: Forward

Senior career*
Years	Team	Apps	(Gls)
2014–2015	Nogoom El Mostakbal FC		
2015–2017	Petrojet	34	(3)
2017–2018	Zamalek SC	4	(0)
2018–2020	Misr Lel Makkasa	34	(1)
2020–2022	El Entag El Harby	12	(1)
2022	→ Eastern Company (loan)	16	(1)
2022–2023	El Dakhleya	11	(0)
2023–2024	Al-Dahab		

International career^{‡}
- Egypt
- * Club domestic league appearances and goals as of 14:11, 8 September 2017 (UTC) ‡ National team caps and goals as of 14:11, 8 September 2017 (UTC)

Mohamed Ramadan is an Egyptian football player who plays as a winger.

On 13 September 2023, Ramadan joined Saudi club Al-Dahab.
