= Jubbah Club =

Association football club in Saudi Arabia

Jubbah
- Full name: Jubbah Club
- Founded: 1978; 48 years ago
- Ground: Jubbah, Ha'il
- Chairman: Abdullah Al-Asmar
- Manager: Abdulaziz Al-Dakheel
- League: Saudi Second Division
- 2024–25: Third Division, Group A 1th place
Home colours	Away colours

Jubbah Club (Arabic: نادي جبة) is a Saudi Arabian football club based in Jubbah, Ha'il and competes in the Saudi Second Division, the third tier of Saudi football.

== Current squad ==
Note: Flags indicate national team as defined under FIFA eligibility rules; some limited exceptions apply. Players may hold more than one non-FIFA nationality.

No.	Pos.	Nation	Player
1	GK	KSA	Mohammed Al-Showaiqi
3	DF	KSA	Abdulaziz Al-Rashidi
4	DF	TUN	Maher Labidi
6	MF	KSA	Khaled Al-Rabbah
9	FW	KSA	Saleh Al-Fraih
10	MF	KSA	Jawad Al-Shammari
12	DF	KSA	Haitham Al-Salhani
14	MF	KSA	Lazzam Al-Shammari
15	DF	KSA	Ibrahim Al Ali
16	MF	KSA	Saoud Al-Zubaid

No.	Pos.	Nation	Player
17	MF	KSA	Bander Al-Qabaa
18	MF	TUN	Fahmi Maaouani
19	FW	CHA	Maher Sharoumah
21	MF	KSA	Abdulaziz Al-Shanof
25	GK	KSA	Mohaya Al-Sulami
30	DF	KSA	Fahad Al-Mohsen
47	MF	KSA	Meshal Nouman
77	MF	KSA	Waleed Al-Johani
87	DF	KSA	Waleed Al-Shammari
88	DF	KSA	Saleh Maghfori
98	GK	KSA	Khaled Al-Showaiqi
—	DF	NGR	Chidiebere Nwakali

== See also ==
- List of football clubs in Saudi Arabia
