= Maxwell Abbey Quaye =

Ghanaian association football player

Maxwell Quaye
Personal information
- Full name: Maxwell Abbey Quaye
- Date of birth: 2 February 1998 (age 28)
- Place of birth: Accra, Ghana
- Height: 1.74 m (5 ft 9 in)
- Position: Forward

Team information
- Current team: Al-Qala
- Number: 7

Youth career
- 2014–2015: Global FC

Senior career*
Years	Team	Apps	(Gls)
2015–2023	Great Olympics		
2023	Loznica		
2023	Duhok		
2023–2024	Al-Sinaa		
2024–2025	Al-Tuhami	25	(23)
2025–	Al-Qala		

International career
2021–	Ghana	1	(0)
2021–	Ghana A'		
2021–	Ghana U23		
- * Club domestic league appearances and goals

Maxwell Nii Abbey Quaye (born 2 February 1998) is a Ghanaian professional footballer who plays as a forward for Al-Qala in Saudi Arabia, and also the Ghana national team. Before, he played in the Ghanaian Premier League for Accra Great Olympics.

== Career ==
Quaye is the assistant captain of Accra Great Olympics. Quaye has been instrumental for Accra Great Olympics especially in the 2020–21 Ghana Premier League Season, scoring a brace in a 2–1 win against Liberty Professionals.

In February 2023, Maxwell joined Serbian First League side FK Loznica.

On 30 March 2025, Quaye joined Saudi Second Division club Al-Qala.
