= Yahya Dagriri =

Saudi Arabian professional footballer

Personal information
- Full name: Yahya Hussain Dagriri
- Date of birth: August 13, 1991 (age 35)
- Place of birth: Jizan, Saudi Arabia
- Position: Forward

Team information
- Current team: Al Tuhami
- Number: 10

Youth career
- Hetteh

Senior career*
Years	Team	Apps	(Gls)
2009–2010	Hetteh		
2010–2016	Al-Ittihad	11	(2)
2013–2014	→ Hetten FC (loan)		
2015–2016	→ Najran SC (loan)	5	(0)
2016	Damac		
2017–2018	Al-Washm		
2019	Hetteh		
2020–2021	Al-Anwar		
2021–2022	Al-Houra		
2022–2023	Mudhar		
2023–	Al-Thoqbah		
2025–	Al Tuhami		

International career
- Saudi Arabia U20
- * Club domestic league appearances and goals

Yahya Dagriri (Arabic: يحيى دغريري; born August 13, 1991), is a Saudi Arabian professional footballer who plays for Al Tuhami as a forward.
