= Al-Taraf Club =

Association football club in Saudi Arabia

Al-Taraf
- Full name: Al-Taraf Club
- Founded: 1980
- Ground: Al-Ahsa, Saudi Arabia
- Manager: ?
- League: Saudi Fourth Division
Home colours	Away colours

Al-Taraf Club is a Saudi Arabian Association football team in Al-Ahsa City playing at the Saudi Fourth Division.

== Notable players ==
- Saad Al Thyab

== See also ==
- List of football clubs in Saudi Arabia
