= Al Selmiyah Club =

Saudi Arabian association football team

Al-Selmiyah
- Full name: Al-Selmiyah Club
- Founded: 1979
- Ground: Al Anwar Club Stadium; Al-Kharj, Riyadh Province, Saudi Arabia
- League: Saudi Third Division
Home colours	Away colours

Al-Selmiyah Club is a Saudi Arabian football team in Al-Kharj City, currently playing in the Saudi Third Division.

== Ascending to Second Division ==
Promoted to the Saudi Second Division after the decision of the Saudi Arabian Football Federation to ascend 8 clubs.

== Current squad ==
As of Saudi Third Division:

Note: Flags indicate national team as defined under FIFA eligibility rules; some limited exceptions apply. Players may hold more than one non-FIFA nationality.

No.	Pos.	Nation	Player
2	DF	KSA	Ibrahim Al-Lehji
4	DF	KSA	Jamaan Al-Dossari
5	DF	KSA	Mohammed Al-Abdulaziz
6	MF	KSA	Mohammed Al-Eisa
7	DF	KSA	Zaid Al-Yami
8	MF	KSA	Rakan Al-Hunaish
9	FW	KSA	Abdullah Al-Wakr
11	MF	KSA	Albaraa Hawsawi
12	DF	KSA	Jaber Al-Shehri
13	FW	KSA	Ahmed Faqihi
14	MF	KSA	Omar Al-Jizani

No.	Pos.	Nation	Player
15	MF	KSA	Ayesh Al-Nakhli
17	MF	KSA	Ibrahim Al-Farhan
18	MF	KSA	Faisal Al-Khotaifi
23	GK	KSA	Mamdouh Harti
24	MF	KSA	Nawaf Al-Dossari
33	GK	KSA	Ali Al-Yami
44	GK	KSA	Omar Al-Otaibi
55	MF	KSA	Idris Mubarak
66	MF	KSA	Zayed Mubarak
77	FW	KSA	Hashem Barnawi
80	FW	KSA	Shareef Harshan

== See also ==
- List of football clubs in Saudi Arabia
