= Al-Taqadom FC =

Association football club in Saudi Arabia

Al-Taqadom
- Full name: Al-Taqadom FC
- Founded: 1972
- Ground: Al-Taqadum Club Stadium; Al-Qasim, Saudi Arabia
- Chairman: Sulaiman Alaboudi
- Manager: Marius Baciu
- League: Third Division
- 2024–25: Saudi Second Division League, 15th of 16, Group B (relegated)
Home colours	Away colours

Al-Taqadom FC is a Saudi Arabian football (soccer) team in Al-Qasim playing at the Saudi Third Division.

== Current squad ==
As of Saudi Third Division:

Note: Flags indicate national team as defined under FIFA eligibility rules; some limited exceptions apply. Players may hold more than one non-FIFA nationality.

No.	Pos.	Nation	Player
1	GK	KSA	Abdullah Al-Mutlaq
4	DF	KSA	Turki Al-Muaitiq
6	MF	KSA	Khalifa Al-Harbi
7	DF	KSA	Mohammed Al-Mansour
10	MF	KSA	Mohammed Al-Khuraidli
11	FW	KSA	Mohammed Al-Harbi
12	DF	KSA	Rafaat Al-Muwallad
17	MF	KSA	Ziyad Al-Otaibi
18	MF	KSA	Azzam Al-Salman
19	MF	KSA	Azzam Al-Juraid
20	DF	KSA	Saleh Al-Mansour

No.	Pos.	Nation	Player
21	DF	KSA	Rayan Mabrok
22	GK	KSA	Naif Al-Harbi
23	FW	KSA	Nawaf Al-Talasi
29	MF	KSA	Maan Al-Maiman
30	MF	KSA	Bandar Al-Mutairi
32	DF	KSA	Ziyad Al-Rowaidhan
44	DF	KSA	Fahad Al-Suyayfi
—	DF	KSA	Mohammed Shaman
—	MF	KSA	Waleed Al-Wothainani
—	MF	KSA	Azzam Al-Salman
—	FW	KSA	Rakan Al-Harbi

== See also ==
- List of football clubs in Saudi Arabia
