= Al-Sharq Club =

Football team in Saudi Second Division

Al-Sharq
- Full name: Al-Sharq Club of Dilam, El tiburón Saudí
- Founded: 1962
- Ground: Al-Dalam, Al-Kharj, Saudi Arabia
- Manager: Hamid Brimil
- League: Saudi Second Division
- 2024-25: Saudi Second Division, 5th (Group B)
| Home colours | Away colours |

Al-Sharq Club of Dilam (Arabic: نادي الشرق بالدلم) is a Saudi Arabian football team in Dilam, south of Riyadh, playing at the Saudi Second Division.

== Current squad ==
As of Saudi Second Division:

Note: Flags indicate national team as defined under FIFA eligibility rules; some limited exceptions apply. Players may hold more than one non-FIFA nationality.

| No. | Pos. | Nation | Player |
|---|---|---|---|
| 2 | DF | KSA | Yazeed Al-Shuwairikh |
| 4 | DF | KSA | Rayan Al-Amer |
| 5 | DF | KSA | Ali Al-Thunayan |
| 6 | MF | BRA | Lucas Gabriel |
| 7 | MF | KSA | Muath Al-Owaidan |
| 8 | MF | GHA | Joe Aidoo |
| 9 | FW | MAR | Abdulwahid Bakhash |
| 10 | FW | KSA | Nasser Al-Owaidan |
| 11 | MF | KSA | Abdulaziz Al-Aliwah |
| 12 | DF | KSA | Adeeb Al-Shumaimary |
| 14 | DF | KSA | Fahad Ghazi |
| 17 | MF | KSA | Abdulaziz Al-Dossari |
| 21 | MF | KSA | Omar Hazazi |

| No. | Pos. | Nation | Player |
|---|---|---|---|
| 23 | MF | KSA | Fares Al-Shahrani |
| 24 | FW | KSA | Ali Al-Khanfir |
| 25 | DF | MAR | Karim El Oualadi |
| 27 | DF | KSA | Sattam Al-Naqeedan |
| 30 | GK | KSA | Ibrahim Al-Omari |
| 50 | GK | KSA | Abdullah Al-Bishi |
| 77 | MF | KSA | Khaled Al-Qattam |
| 78 | FW | KSA | Bader Bandar |
| 87 | DF | KSA | Mohammed Marzouq |
| 88 | MF | KSA | Mansour Asiri |
| 90 | FW | KSA | Khalid Al Jubaya |
| 99 | DF | KSA | Faisal Al-Tamrah |

== See also ==
- List of football clubs in Saudi Arabia
