= Al-Qarah FC =

Association football club in Saudi Arabia

Al-Qarah
- Full name: Al-Qarah FC
- Founded: 1978
- Ground: Prince Abdullah bin Jalawi Stadium; Al-Hasa, Saudi Arabia
- Capacity: 20,000
- Chairman: ?
- Manager: ?
- League: Saudi Fourth Division
Home colours	Away colours

Al-Qarah FC is a Saudi Arabian football (soccer) team in Al-Hasa City playing at the Saudi Fourth Division.

== Stadium ==
Currently the team plays at the 20000 capacity Prince Abdullah bin Jalawi Stadium.

== Current squad ==
Note: Flags indicate national team as defined under FIFA eligibility rules; some limited exceptions apply. Players may hold more than one non-FIFA nationality.

No.	Pos.	Nation	Player
2	MF	KSA	Modhaher Al-Jumaa
3	DF	KSA	Abdullah Al-Hamad
4	DF	KSA	Abdulrahman Al-Hussain
5	DF	KSA	Abdullah Al-Yousef
7	MF	KSA	Hussain Al-Abdulateef
8	MF	KSA	Ghali Al-Mahdi
9	FW	KSA	Mohammed Al-Mezraq
10	MF	KSA	Mohammed Al-Ashour
11	MF	KSA	Ibrahim Al-Rasheed
12	DF	KSA	Mohammed Al-Fouz
13	FW	KSA	Rayan Al-Ahmed

No.	Pos.	Nation	Player
17	MF	KSA	Jassem Al-Ahmed
18	DF	KSA	Montadhar Al-Awwad
19	FW	KSA	Ali Al-Khodhair
20	FW	KSA	Saoud Al-Ayed
22	GK	KSA	Bassam Al-Leili
23	DF	KSA	Ibrahim Al-Hwikem
24	DF	KSA	Ali Al-Jbarah
33	GK	KSA	Ali Al-Eid
55	GK	KSA	Abdullah Al-Abdullah
88	DF	KSA	Abdullah Bo Khedher
90	MF	KSA	Musaed Al-Shaalan
99	FW	KSA	Mahdi Al-Ali

== See also ==
- List of football clubs in Saudi Arabia
