= Asyah =

Town in Al-Qassim Province, Saudi Arabia

Asyah (Al-Asyeah or Asyeah; Arabic: الأسياح) is a Saudi Arabian town in Al Qassim Province. It has a total area of 200 km^{2}.

== History ==
The history of the Al-asyah dates back to 1,400 years ago. In the Uthman ibn Affan era, Asyah was built to help pilgrims. It is famous for its many wells.

== Location ==
Asyah is located in the Al-Qassim region of central Saudi Arabia. It is almost 330 km north of Riyadh. It is bordered by the Ha'il Region to the north.

== Education ==
The province has more than 30 schools for boys, with more than 6,000 total students.

== Villages ==
There are more than thirteen hamlets. The most famous are Ain ibn Fahid, Koseba, AL-Tanumah, and Aba Elworood.

== Sport ==
The main football team, Mared, was established in 1979.
