= Al-Dahab Club =

Saudi Arabian association football team

Al-Dahab
- Full name: Al-Dahab Club
- Founded: 2014
- Ground: Mahd adh Dhahab, Medina, Saudi Arabia
- League: Saudi Second Division
Home colours	Away colours

Al-Dahab Club is a Saudi Arabian football team in Mahd adh Dhahab City playing at the Saudi Second Division.

== Ascending to Second Division ==
He promoted to the Saudi Second Division after the decision of the Saudi Arabian Football Federation to ascend 8 clubs.

== Current squad ==
As of Saudi Third Division:

Note: Flags indicate national team as defined under FIFA eligibility rules; some limited exceptions apply. Players may hold more than one non-FIFA nationality.

No.	Pos.	Nation	Player
1	GK	KSA	Ahmed Al-Harbi
2	DF	KSA	Maithem Al-Hajoj
3	DF	KSA	Khaled Al-Sulami
5	MF	KSA	Talal Al-Johani
6	MF	KSA	Abdullah Al-Mehmadi
8	MF	KSA	Hisham Nawawi
11	FW	KSA	Muneer Al-Harbi
12	DF	KSA	Samir Sanousi
14	MF	KSA	Mohanad Al-Rowaitei
15	FW	KSA	Mohammed Al-Sherif
18	MF	KSA	Abdullah Al-Amri

No.	Pos.	Nation	Player
19	DF	KSA	Moath Al-Johani
20	FW	KSA	Mohammed Al-Mutairi
21	DF	KSA	Nawaf Al-Rashidi
26	DF	KSA	Naif Al-Sobhi
27	DF	KSA	Mohammed Al-Shanqiti
77	FW	KSA	Anas Al-Johani
90	GK	KSA	Fawaz Al-Khaibari
99	MF	KSA	Anas Al-Masakti
—	GK	KSA	Nahar Al-Yami
—	DF	KSA	Majed Al-Hunaiti
—	MF	KSA	Abdullah Al-Bladi
—	MF	KSA	Loay Al-Johani

== See also ==
- List of football clubs in Saudi Arabia
