= Al-Ula FC =

Association football club in Saudi Arabia

Al-Ula
- Full name: Al-Ula Football Club
- Nickname: Al-Nomur Al-Arabiya (The Arabian leopards)
- Founded: 1981; 45 years ago, as Wadi Al-Qura
- Ground: Prince Mohammed bin Abdulaziz Stadium
- Capacity: 24,000
- Owner: AlUla Royal Commission
- Chairman: Ziad Al-Suhaibani
- Head coach: José Peseiro
- League: First Division League
- 2025–26: First Division League, 4th of 18
- Website: alulaclub.sa
Home colours

Al-Ula FC (Arabic: نادي العلا) is a Saudi Arabian professional football club based in Al-Ula that competes in the Saudi First Division League, the second tier of the Saudi football league system.

== History ==
The roots of the foundation of Al-Ula FC go back to 1978 when a friendly match was held between two amateur sides in the governorate. The match was attended by the governor of Medina Province at the time, Prince Abdulmohsen bin Abdulaziz. Following the match's success, the two teams' leaders agreed to merge both clubs into one that would represent the governorate. The club was officially registered with the General Presidency of Youth Welfare in 1981 under the name of Wadi Al-Qura. A few years later the club changed their to AlUla. Since its inception, the club has had eight presidents, with Mousa Abdulwahed being the first.

Al-Ula had a relatively anonymous existence in the lower tiers of Saudi football until June 2023, when the club came under the control of the Royal Commission for AlUla, a state commission under Mohammed bin Salman as part of the Saudi Vision 2030.

As part of the takeover, the club made substantial investments in new players, including Brazilian forward Allan Sousa, who joined from Danish club AaB for an annual salary believed to be €2.5 million. This significant signing occurred despite the club's participation in the Saudi Third Division, which is the fourth tier of the Saudi football league system. Sousa was presented alongside Nigerian forward Christian Irobiso. Sousa and Irobiso became the first foreign players in the club's history. In addition to Sousa and Irobiso's signings, the club also made other high-profile signings including former Saudi international Hamad Al-Juhaim, Ghallab Al-Enezi, Fahad Al-Johani and Muhannad Awadh. All of whom joined from First Division sides. During the January transfer window, AlUla made further additions to their squad including First Division top scorer Ousmane Barry, and Pro League winners Aqeel Baalghyth and Housain Al-Mogahwi. On 8 March 2024, AlUla secured promotion to the third tier, the Saudi Second Division League, for the first time in history after beating Al-Fao 3–1 in the final matchday of the group stages. On 23 March 2024, AlUla won the Saudi Third Division for the first time after defeating Al-Anwar 8–7 on penalties (2–2 after extra time) in the final.

== Honours ==
- Saudi Second Division League (tier 3)
  - Runners-up (1): 2024–25
- Saudi Third Division League (tier 4)
  - Winners (1): 2023–24

== Current squad ==
As of 20 August 2026

Note: Flags indicate national team as defined under FIFA eligibility rules; some limited exceptions apply. Players may hold more than one non-FIFA nationality.

No.	Pos.	Nation	Player
1	GK	KSA	Ahmed Al Jubaya
2	DF	KSA	Yasser Yaqoub (on loan from Abha)
3	FW	KSA	Aseel Abdulrazaq
4	DF	KSA	Yousef Haqawi
5	DF	FRA	Yoann Barbet
7	MF	POR	André Horta
8	MF	KSA	Abdulmajeed Al-Sulaiheem
9	FW	KSA	Abdulfattah Adam
10	MF	KSA	Ayman Al-Khulaif
11	MF	KSA	Zaid Al-Anazi
13	GK	KSA	Abdulquddus Atiah
14	DF	KSA	Fahad Al-Jumayah
16	MF	KSA	Yousef Al-Hunaifish
18	MF	KSA	Younes Al-Shanqeeti
19	MF	KSA	Abdulaziz Al-Hatila

No.	Pos.	Nation	Player
20	DF	KSA	Mansour Munshi
24	DF	KSA	Ammar Al-Dohaim
25	DF	KSA	Ali Al-Nakhli
26	DF	KSA	Mohammed Hawsawi
27	DF	KSA	Hamdan Al-Shamrani
29	MF	KSA	Mohammed Al-Majhad
30	MF	BUL	Damyan Yordanov
37	GK	KSA	Faris Afandy
66	DF	KSA	Khaled Al-Ruwaili
67	FW	HON	Romell Quioto
88	MF	KSA	Sumayhan Al-Nabit
91	FW	NED	Sylla Sow
96	FW	BRA	Michael
—	DF	KSA	Abdulrahman Al-Obaid
—	MF	KSA	Bader Al-Omair

=== Out on loan ===
Note: Flags indicate national team as defined under FIFA eligibility rules; some limited exceptions apply. Players may hold more than one non-FIFA nationality.

No.	Pos.	Nation	Player
12	DF	KSA	Khaled Al-Shamrani (at Abha)
45	MF	KSA	Faisal Al-Asmari (at Hajer)

No.	Pos.	Nation	Player
99	FW	KSA	Freej Al-Jizani (at Damac)

== Current staff ==
Position	Name
Head coach	(Portugal) José Peseiro
Assistant coach	(Portugal) Nuno Presume (Portugal) Tiago Oliveira (Tunisia) Karim Arfaoui (Saudi Arabia) Mansour Al-Harbi (Saudi Arabia) Mohammed Al-Abdali
Goalkeeper coach	(Portugal) Roberto Rivelino
Conditioning coach	(Greece) Stergios Fotopoulos
Youth coach	(Spain) Ángel Francisco Murcia (Portugal) Victor Silva
Match analyst	(Saudi Arabia) Omar Al-Nakhli
Doctor	(Saudi Arabia) Khaled Hawsawi
Physiotherapist	(Saudi Arabia) Rayan Ameen
Masseur	(Saudi Arabia) Salem Al-Mousa
Team coordinator	(Portugal) André David
Team manager	(Malta) Ray Farrugia

== See also ==
- List of football clubs in Saudi Arabia
