= Baish =

Baish محافظة بيش
- Governorate
- Location within Saudi Arabia
- Coordinates: 17.383333°N 42.566667°E
- Country: Saudi Arabia
- Region: Jazan Province

Population (2016)
  - Total: 70,421
- Time zone: UTC+3 (EAT)
  - Summer (DST): UTC+3 (EAT)

Baish (Arabic: بيش) is one of the governorates in Jazan Province, Saudi Arabia.
