= Al-Dera'a FC =

Association football team in Saudi Arabia

Al Dera'a
- Full name: Al Dera'a FC
- Founded: 1976
- Ground: Dawadmi, Riyadh, Saudi Arabia
- Manager: Nassr Marsali
- League: Saudi Second Division
Home colours	Away colours

Al Dera'a FC is a Saudi Arabian football team in Dawadmi City playing at the Saudi Second Division.

== Current squad ==
As of Saudi Third Division:

Note: Flags indicate national team as defined under FIFA eligibility rules; some limited exceptions apply. Players may hold more than one non-FIFA nationality.

No.	Pos.	Nation	Player
1	GK	KSA	Ahmed Zanoum
2	MF	KSA	Abdullah Al-Harthi
3	DF	KSA	Abdulaziz Al-Suwailem
4	DF	KSA	Fares Al-Harbi
5	MF	KSA	Abdulelah Haqawi
6	DF	KSA	Ahmed Al-Absi
7	FW	KSA	Fahad Haqawi
10	MF	KSA	Abdullah Al-Bar
11	MF	KSA	Abdulrahman Al-Dhali
18	FW	KSA	Nawaf Al-Qarni
22	DF	KSA	Hassan Suroor
24	DF	KSA	Abdulelah Al-Sonaitan

No.	Pos.	Nation	Player
26	MF	KSA	Faisal Al-Zahrani
27	FW	KSA	Ali Al-Qarni
28	DF	KSA	Khaled Al-Shamrani
29	FW	KSA	Mohammed Assiri
30	FW	KSA	Rashed Al-Otaibi
36	DF	KSA	Abdullah Al-Qahtani
50	GK	KSA	Saeed Al-Muwallad
75	DF	KSA	Bassam Hawsawi
92	GK	KSA	Basem Almas
99	FW	KSA	Sultan Al-Rashidi
—	DF	KSA	Bassam Hawsawi
—	MF	KSA	Ali Al-Qarni

== See also ==
- List of football clubs in Saudi Arabia
