= Al-Zulfi FC =

Association football club in Saudi Arabia

Al-Zulfi
- Full name: Al-Zulfi FC
- Founded: 1969; 57 years ago, as Markh; 2006; 20 years ago, as Al-Zulfi
- Ground: Al-Zulfi, Saudi Arabia
- Capacity: 3,080
- Owner: JarAllah Aledaib
- Chairman: Abdullah Al-Nasser
- Head coach: Khalid Al-Koroni
- League: First Division League
- 2025–26: FDL, 8th of 18

Al-Zulfi FC (Arabic: نادي الزلفي) is a Saudi Arabian football club based in Al-Zulfi and competes in the Saudi First Division League, the second tier in the Saudi Arabian football league system.

== History ==
The club was formerly known as Markh Club before changing to their current name in 2006 and its first president was Abdullah Mohammed Al-Humaidi.

== Current squad ==
As of Saudi First Division League:

Note: Flags indicate national team as defined under FIFA eligibility rules; some limited exceptions apply. Players may hold more than one non-FIFA nationality.

No.	Pos.	Nation	Player
2	DF	KSA	Abdullah Al-Hassan
6	DF	KSA	Abdulrahman Al-Hajeri
7	MF	KSA	Maher Al-Mutairi
15	MF	KSA	Mutair Al-Zahrani
19	FW	KSA	Majed Madani
22	GK	KSA	Saad Al-Saleh
28	FW	COD	Ben Malango
34	MF	KSA	Abdulaziz Al-Sharid
41	MF	KSA	Faisal Ben Juraibah
47	DF	KSA	Saud Al-Bawardi
67	MF	KSA	Mohammed Bakr
70	MF	KSA	Ahmed Al-Anzi
77	FW	KSA	Nawaf Asiri
81	MF	GAM	Sulayman Jawla

No.	Pos.	Nation	Player
99	FW	KSA	Basem Al-Fenetel
—	GK	KSA	Aqbah Al-Mushawh
—	DF	KSA	Suwailem Al-Manhali (on loan from (Saudi Arabia) Al-Riyadh)
—	DF	KSA	Ali Al-Nakhli
—	DF	KSA	Ali Dagarshawi
—	DF	KSA	Bader Fallatah
—	MF	KSA	Talal Al-Showaiqi
—	MF	KSA	Ali Abo Shahin
—	MF	BRA	Ricardo Ryller
—	MF	ALB	Dejvi Bregu
—	FW	MLI	Demba Diallo
—	FW	JOR	Mohannad Semreen
—	FW	KSA	Nawaf Bouamer

== Coaching staff ==
Role	Name
Chairman	(Saudi Arabia) Abdullah Al-Nasser
Head coach	(Saudi Arabia) Khalid Al-Koroni
Assistant coach	(Saudi Arabia) Abdulrahman Al-Marzouq (Saudi Arabia) Farhan Al-Harbi
Goalkeeper coach	(Saudi Arabia) Hassan Al-Bashri
Fitness Coach	(Saudi Arabia) Yousef Bakheet
Performance analyst	(Saudi Arabia) Mohammed Al-Nakhli
Sporting director	(Saudi Arabia) Nawaf Al-Shaeri
Team doctor	(Saudi Arabia) Mohammed Al-Salman
Physiotherapist	(Saudi Arabia) Omar Tankar
Masseur	(Saudi Arabia) Hassan Al-Ruwaili
Academy manager	(Saudi Arabia) Yousef Al-Subaie

== See also ==
- List of football clubs in Saudi Arabia
