= Al-Qala Club =

Association football club in Saudi Arabia

Al-Qala
- Full name: Al-Qala Club
- Founded: 1974
- Ground: Al-Jawf, Saudi Arabia
- Chairman: Salman Al-Qayid
- Manager: Yousri bin Kahla
- League: Saudi Second Division
- 2015–16: Group B 10th place
Home colours	Away colours

Al-Qala Club (Arabic: نادي القلعة) is a Saudi Arabian football (soccer) team in Al-Jawf playing at the Saudi Second Division.

== Current squad ==
Note: Flags indicate national team as defined under FIFA eligibility rules; some limited exceptions apply. Players may hold more than one non-FIFA nationality.

No.	Pos.	Nation	Player
3	DF	KSA	Mohammed Al-Huzaim
4	DF	KSA	Yazan Al-Buhairan
5	DF	KSA	Abdulaziz Al-Enezi
7	FW	GHA	Maxwell Abbey Quaye
11	DF	KSA	Awdah Al-Karia
12	DF	KSA	Fahad Faleh
13	DF	KSA	Farhan Al-Ruwaili
17	DF	KSA	Meshal Khalaf
19	FW	KSA	Majed Al-Zaid
20	MF	KSA	Anas Al-Rabie
21	DF	KSA	Anwar Al-Ruwaili

No.	Pos.	Nation	Player
22	GK	KSA	Ali Barri
24	MF	KSA	Abdullah Nasser
30	MF	KSA	Hatem Al-Fohaiqi
40	GK	KSA	Ahmed Al-Fahmi
91	GK	KSA	Mohammed Babtain
99	FW	SEN	Abdoukarim Dieme
—	DF	KSA	Faisal Al-Dossari
—	MF	KSA	Mohammed Attiyah
—	FW	KSA	Abdullah Al-Saihani

== See also ==
- List of football clubs in Saudi Arabia
