= Saudi Third Division =

- Organising body: Saudi Arabian Football Federation (SAFF)
- Founded: 1996; 30 years ago
- Country: Saudi Arabia
- Confederation: AFC
- Number of clubs: 40 (since 2023–24)
- Level on pyramid: 4
- Promotion to: Saudi Second Division League
- Relegation to: Saudi Fourth Division
- Current champions: Al-Qala (1st title) (2024–25)
- Most championships: Al-Okhdood; Al-Safa (2 titles each)
- Broadcaster(s): SAFF+
- Website: saff.com.sa/en/
- Current: 2025–26 Saudi Third Division

The Saudi Third Division, is a football league, the fourth tier of the Saudi Arabian football league system.

== History ==
The competition was created in 1996 and took up the old format of the Saudi Second Division. The first phase of competition was a group stage with teams divided into geographical locations based on the provinces of Saudi Arabia. The second phase was a knockout round tournament, with the group winners and runners-up taking part.

On 9 October 2020, the Saudi FF announced a new format for the Third Division starting from the 2021–22 season. The competition would consist of 32 teams divided into 4 groups, with the group winners earning promotion to the Saudi Second Division League. Al-Suqoor, now known as Neom, were the first champions of the new format.

During the 2023–24 season, the number of teams participating was increased to 40 teams.

== Competition format ==
The 4 group winners would get promoted to the Saudi Second Division. The bottom 4 teams are relegated to the Fourth Division.

== Champions ==
=== Old Format (1997–2021) ===
Season	Champions	Runners-up	3rd Place (Note: No third place play-off was played in 2017–18 and 2020–21; losing semi-finalists are listed in alphabetical order.)	4th Place
1996–97	Al-Orobah			
1997–98	Al-Hazem	Al-Qarah	Al-Okhdood	Al-Ta'alof
1998–99	Abha	Al-Kholood	Al-Jubail	Al-Oyoon
1999–2000	Al-Oyoon	Al-Jabalain	Al-Rabe'e	Al-Sadd
2000–01	Al-Adalah	Al-Faisaly	Al-Okhdood	Al-Arabi
2001–02	Al-Arabi	Al-Tuhami	Al-Fayha	Al-Noor
2002–03	Al-Watani	Damac	Najd	Al-Rawdah
2003–04	Al-Okhdood	Al-Tuhami	Al-Khuwaildiyah	Al-Taqadom
2004–05	Al-Rabe'e	Al-Qotah	Al-Kawkab	Al-Nakhil
2005–06	Al-Noor	Al-Oyoon	Heraa	Neom SC
2006–07	Hetten	Al-Diriyah	Al-Rawdah	Al-Nakhil
2007–08	Al-Qaisumah	Al-Batin	Al-Mujazzal	Al-Jeel
2008–09	Najd	Al-Arabi	Al-Ain	Al-Nakhil
2009–10	Al-Taqadom	Al-Oyoon	Al-Kawkab	Al-Badaya
2010–11	Al-Safa	Al-Ain	Al-Taraji	Al-Salam
2011–12	Al-Tuhami	Al-Mujazzal	Al-Qala	Wej
2012–13	Al-Nojoom	Al-Zulfi	Al-Okhdood	Al-Sharq
2013–14	Al-Muzahimiyyah	Al-Sahel	Wej	Al-Adalah
2014–15	Al-Jabalain	Al-Qaisumah	Al-Washm	Al-Qala
2015–16	Al-Ain	Al-Suqoor	Al-Rabe'e	Al-Thoqbah
2016–17	Al-Kholood	Al-Hejaz	Al-Taqadom	Al Jubail
2017–18	Al-Okhdood	Al-Dera'a	Al-Jandal and Al-Sahel	
2018–19	Al Safa	Al-Rawdhah	Al-Entesar	Al-Anwar
2019–20	Canceled due to COVID-19 pandemic			
2020–21	Al-Saqer	Al-Nairyah	Al-Rayyan and Tuwaiq	

=== New Format (2021–) ===
Season	Champion	Runners-up
2021–22	Al-Suqoor	Al-Qous
2022–23	Mudhar	Al-Noor
2023–24	Al-Ula	Al-Anwar
2024–25	Al-Qala	Jubbah
2025–26	Al-Qwarah	Qilwah

== Performance by club ==
Club	Titles	Winning years
Al-Okhdood	2	2003–04, 2017–18
Al-Safa	2	2010–11, 2018–19
Al-Orobah	1	1996–97
Al-Hazem	1	1997–98
Abha	1	1998–99
Al-Oyoon	1	1999–2000
Al-Adalah	1	2000–01
Al-Arabi	1	2001–02
Al-Watani	1	2002–03
Jeddah	1	2004–05
Al-Noor	1	2005–06
Hetten	1	2006–07
Al-Qaisumah	1	2007–08
Najd	1	2008–09
Al-Taqadom	1	2009–10
Al-Tuhami	1	2011–12
Al-Nojoom	1	2012–13
Al-Muzahimiyyah	1	2013–14
Al-Jabalain	1	2014–15
Al-Ain	1	2015–16
Al-Kholood	1	2016–17
Al-Saqer	1	2020–21
Al-Suqoor	1	2021–22
Mudhar	1	2022–23
Al-Ula	1	2023–24
Al-Qala	1	2024–25
Al-Qwarah	1	2025–26

== Top scorers ==
Season	Player	Goals	Club
2021–22	Hamed Al-Shammeri (Saudi Arabia)	12	Qaryah Al-Ulya
2022–23	Abdulaziz Al-Merdasi (Saudi Arabia)	12	Afif
2023–24	Slim Mezlini (Tunisia)	14	Al-Eetemad
2024–25	Maxwell Abbey Quaye (Ghana)	18	Al-Tuhami

== Broadcasters ==
Since the 2024–25 season

Country	Broadcaster	Ref.
Worldwide	SAFF+	
