= Al Tuhami Club =

Association football club in Saudi Arabia

Al-Tuhami Club
- Full name: Al-Tuhami Sports Club
- Founded: 1948
- Ground: King Faisal Sport City Stadium; Jizan, Saudi Arabia
- Capacity: 10,000
- Chairman: Hamza Qanai
- League: Saudi Fourth Division

Al-Tuhami Club (Arabic: نادي التهامي) is a Saudi Arabian professional football club based in Jizan and was founded in 1948. The club also consists of various other departments including karate, taekwondo, volleyball, water polo, weightlifting and cycling. The club is one of the oldest clubs in Saudi Arabia. The club was founded by Mohammed Salem Baeshen.

== Current squad ==
As of Saudi Third Division:

Note: Flags indicate national team as defined under FIFA eligibility rules; some limited exceptions apply. Players may hold more than one non-FIFA nationality.

No.	Pos.	Nation	Player
2	DF	KSA	Khairat Mahnashi
4	DF	KSA	Talha Hawsawi
5	DF	KSA	Mohammed Al-Nakhli
6	MF	KSA	Yasser Abdulwahed
8	MF	KSA	Khaled Sallami
10	FW	KSA	Yahya Dagriri
11	MF	KSA	Shaher Al-Johani
13	DF	KSA	Hilal Doshi
14	FW	KSA	Mohammed Mekbesh
16	MF	KSA	Abdulaziz Awaji
17	MF	KSA	Aseel Suwayed

No.	Pos.	Nation	Player
18	MF	KSA	Ibrahim Qaisi
19	MF	KSA	Badr Marei
20	FW	KSA	Ahmed Al-Arab
21	DF	KSA	Ali Maghfouri
22	GK	KSA	Alwaleed Safhi
24	FW	KSA	Nawaf Sharahili
29	DF	KSA	Mofareh Hazazi
44	DF	KSA	Jaafer Al-Saeed
66	FW	KSA	Abdullah Sufyani
72	DF	KSA	Ahmed Hakami
99	GK	KSA	Jamal Hafidh

== See also ==
- List of football clubs in Saudi Arabia
