= Saudi Fourth Division =

- Organising body: Saudi Arabian Football Federation (SAFF)
- Founded: 2021; 5 years ago
- Country: Saudi Arabia
- Confederation: AFC
- Number of clubs: 32 (final stage); 74 (total)
- Level on pyramid: 5
- Promotion to: Saudi Third Division
- Current champions: Al-Majd (1st title) (2025–26)
- Broadcaster(s): SAFF+
- Website: saff.com.sa/en/
- Current: 2025–26 Saudi Fourth Division

The Saudi Fourth Division, also known as The Kingdom Championship for Fourth Division Clubs, is a football league, the fifth tier of the Saudi Arabian football league system. The competition starts as a regional tournament in each of the Provinces of Saudi Arabia, a total of 74 teams compete in group stages to decide the 32 places in the final stage.

== History ==
The league was inaugurated in 2021 after the Saudi Arabian Football Federation announced changes to the Saudi Third Division format. With the newly created Fourth Division taking up the old format of the Third Division.

The competition starts with regional groups based on their geographical locations, with the group winners and some runners-up qualifying directly to the Round of 32. While other runners-up qualify for the preliminary round to determine the rest of the Round of 32 participants.

In the first season of the Fourth Division, 6 teams were promoted to the Third Division. The four semi-finalists and two play-off spots played between the two losing quarter-finalists. After the Third Division was expanded to 40 teams, 14 teams were promoted to the Third Division.

Ever since the 2023–24 season, 4 teams are promoted to the Third Division each season, the four semi-finalists.

== Performance by season ==
Season	Champions	Runners-up	Losing semi-finalists
2021–22	Al-Khaldi	Al-Tasamoh	Al-Sawari and Al-Waseel
2022–23	Al-Hada	Muneef	Al-Ghazwa and Al-Hilalea
2023–24	Al-Nakhal	Al-Hedaya	Al-Yarmouk and Al-Fadhal
2024–25	Blue Star	Al-Qarah	Al-Almin and Al Maseef
2025–26	Al-Majd	Al-Oyon	Al-Watan and Al-Salam

== Performance by club ==
Club	Titles	Winning years
Al-Khaldi	1	2021–22
Al-Hada	1	2022–23
Al-Nakhal	1	2023–24
Blue Star	1	2024–25
Al-Majd	1	2025–26

== Broadcasters ==
Since the 2024–25 season

Country	Broadcaster	Ref.
Worldwide	SAFF+	
