= List of football clubs in Saudi Arabia =

This is a list of association football clubs in Saudi Arabia by province.

== Eastern Province ==
- Mudhar Club
- Al-Khaleej FC
- Al-Ettifaq Club
- Al Fateh SC
- Al Adalah Club
- Hajer FC
- Al-Jeel Club
- Al Qadsiah FC
- Al-Jubail Club
- Al-Nahda Club
- Al-Qarah FC
- Al-Rawdah Club
- Al-Omran Club
- Al-Nojoom FC
- Al-Thoqbah Club
- Al-Taraji Club
- Al-Nairyah Club
- Al-Sahel SC
- Al-Safa Club
- Al-Qaisumah FC
- Al-Noor FC

== Riyadh Province ==
- Al-Washm Club
- Al-Riyadh FC
- Al Hilal SFC
- Al-Nassr FC
- Al Shabab Club
- Al-Anwar Club
- Diriyah Club
- Al-Zulfi FC
- Al Faisaly FC
- Al-Kawkab FC
- Al-Shoulla FC
- Tuwaiq Club

== Hail Province ==
- Al-Tai FC
- Al-Jabalain Club
- Al-Lewaa Club
- Al-Rayyan Club
- Al-Gottah FC

== Al-Jawf Province ==
- Al-Orobah FC
- Al-Jandal SC
- Al-Qala Club

== Mecca Province ==
- Al-Ahli
- Al-Ittihad
- Al-Wehda FC
- Jeddah Club
- Al-Entesar Club
- Al-Qous FC
- Wej SC

Citation Needed.

== See also ==
- Provinces of Saudi Arabia
- List of governorates of Saudi Arabia
- List of cities and towns in Saudi Arabia
- Sport in Saudi Arabia
