= 2024–25 Saudi Third Division =

4th season of the Saudi Third Division

Saudi Third Division
- Season: 2024–25
- Dates: 25 October 2024 – 14 March 2025
- Champions: Al-Qala (1st title)
- Promoted: Al-Qala; Jubbah; Al-Nairyah; Afif
- Relegated: Al-Taraf; Al-Salam; Al-Hedaya; Al-Amjad
- Matches: 363
- Goals: 940 (2.59 per match)
- Top goalscorer: Maxwell Quaye (18 goals)
- Biggest home win: Al-Fadhl 8–0 Al-Amjad (8 February 2025)
- Biggest away win: Al-Salam 1–7 Al-Yarmouk (1 February 2025)
- Highest scoring: Al-Noor 3–6 Al-Tuhami (14 February 2024); Al-Fao 5–4 Al-Yarmouk (27 February 2024)
- Longest winning run: Afif (6 matches)
- Longest unbeaten run: Al-Nairyah (14 matches)
- Longest winless run: Al-Amjad; Al-Hedaya (18 matches)
- Longest losing run: Al-Amjad; Al-Salam (7 matches)
- All statistics correct as of 14 March 2025.

The 2024–25 Saudi Third Division was the fourth season of the Saudi Third Division since its inception in 2021. The season started on 25 October 2024 and concluded with the final on 14 March 2025. The group stage draw was held on 21 May 2024.

The final was played on 14 March 2025 between Al-Qala and Jubbah. Al-Qala defeated Jubbah 1–0 to win their first title.

== Team changes ==
A total of 40 teams are contesting the league, including 32 sides from the 2023–24 season, 4 relegated teams from the Second Division, and 4 promoted teams from the Fourth Division.

=== To Third Division ===
Promoted from the Fourth Division

- Al-Nakhal
- Al-Hedaya
- Al-Fadhl
- Al-Yarmouk

Relegated from Second Division

- Al-Shaeib
- Afif
- Al-Nairyah
- Al-Noor

=== From Third Division ===
Promoted to Second Division

- Al-Ula
- Al-Anwar
- Al-Sharq
- Al-Ghottah

Relegated to the Fourth Division

- Al-Mujazzal
- Al-Tasamoh
- Al-Thoqbah
- Khaybar

== Teams ==
Group A

Locations of teams in the 2024–25 Saudi Third Division Group A

Club	Location	Stadium
Al-Hada	Tarout Island	Al-Safa Club Stadium (Safwa City)
Al-Hedaya	Aljish	Prince Nayef bin Abdulaziz Stadium
Al-Hilaliyah	Al Bukayriyah	Department of Education Stadium (Unaizah)
Al-Muzahimiyyah	Al-Muzahmiyya	Irqah Sports Stadium (Riyadh)
Al-Nahda	Dammam	Prince Fahd bin Salman Stadium
Al-Shaeib	Huraymila	Irqah Sports Stadium (Riyadh)
Jubbah	Jubbah	Al-Jabalain Club Stadium (Ha'il)
Muhayil	Muhayil	Muhayil Club Stadium
Munief	Turubah	Okaz Club Stadium (Ta'if)
Radwa	Yanbu	Al-Majd Club Stadium

Group B

Locations of teams in the 2024–25 Saudi Third Division Group B

Club	Location	Stadium
Afif	Afif	Al-Dera'a Club Stadium (Dawadmi)
Al-Amjad	Sabya	King Faisal Sport City Stadium (Jizan)
Al-Asyah	Asyah	Al-Bukiryah Club Stadium (Al Bukayriyah)
Al-Bateen	Dhurma	Al-Bateen Club Stadium
Al-Fadhl	Al-Hasa (Al Fodhool)	Al-Rawdhah Club Stadium
Al-Qwarah	Al Qwarah	Al-Qwarah Club Stadium
Al-Selmiyah	Al-Salamiyah	Al-Anwar Club Stadium (Hotat Bani Tamim)
Baish	Baish	Baish Club Stadium
Qaryah Al-Ulya	Qaryat al-Ulya	Qaryah Al-Ulya Club Stadium
Sajer	Sajir	Al-Washm Club Stadium (Shaqraa)

Group C

Locations of teams in the 2024–25 Saudi Third Division Group C

Club	Location	Stadium
Al-Dahab	Mahd adh Dhahab	Ohod Club Stadium (Medina)
Al-Dera'a	Dawadmi	Al-Dera'a Club Stadium
Al-Fao	Wadi ad-Dawasir	Prince Nasser bin Abdul Aziz Sports City
Al-Noor	Sanabes	Prince Nayef bin Abdulaziz Stadium (Qatif)
Al-Qala	Sakakah	Al-Qala Club Stadium
Al-Salam	Al-Awamiyah	Al-Safa Club Stadium (Safwa City)
Al-Tuhami	Jizan	King Faisal Sport City Stadium
Al-Watani	Tabuk	King Khalid Sport City Stadium
Al-Yarmouk	Abu ʽArish	King Faisal Sport City Stadium (Jizan)
Qilwah	Qilwah	Qilwah Club Stadium

Group D

Locations of teams in the 2024–25 Saudi Third Division Group D

Club	Location	Stadium
Al-Eetemad	Raudat Sudair	Najd Club Stadium (H̨awţah Sudayr)
Al-Ghazwa	Badr	Al-Ghazwa Club Stadium
Al-Khaldi	Al Wajh	Al-Khaldi Club Stadium
Al-Mehmal	Thadig	Al-Hamadah Club Stadium (Al-Ghat)
Al-Nairyah	Al Nairyah	Al-Nairyah Club Stadium
Al-Nakhal	Yanbu	Al-Majd Club Stadium
Al-Omran	Al-Hasa (Al-Omran)	Hajer Club Stadium
Al-Taraf	Al-Hasa (Al-Taraf)	Prince Abdullah bin Jalawi Reserve Stadium
Haql	Haql	Haql Club Stadium
Sharurah	Sharurah	Sharurah Club Stadium

=== Foreign players ===
On 9 March 2024, the Saudi FF announced that the number of foreign players would be increased from 2 players to 3 players.

Players name in bold indicates the player is registered during the mid-season transfer window.

Club	Player 1	Player 2	Player 3	Former players
Afif	(Armenia) Zaven Badoyan	(Nigeria) Julius Ufuoma	(Russia) **Nikita Tankov**	(Tunisia) Ahmad Boussaid
Al-Amjad	(Egypt) Abdallah Khater	(Sudan) Hassan Mutwakil	(Tunisia) Sami Hammami	
Al-Asyah	(Egypt) Alaa Anas	(Senegal) **Moussa Sow**		(Brazil) Venâncio (Egypt) Mohamed Nagy
Al-Bateen	(Egypt) Ahmad El Safty	(Yemen) Ahmed Balkheir		(Egypt) Amr Marey
Al-Dahab	(Mauritania) Abou Sy	(Mauritania) Mohamed Vall El Kory		(Egypt) Mohamed El Beshbeshi
Al-Dera'a	(Tunisia) Alaa Ben Romdhane	(Tunisia) **Houssem Gatfia**	(Tunisia) Belhassen Mejri	(Senegal) Baba Cissé
Al-Eetemad	(Mauritania) Fody Traoré	(Tunisia) Skander Amor	(Tunisia) Slim Mezlini	
Al-Fadhl	(Chad) Taher Mahamat	(Mauritania) Moussa Akhadij		
Al-Fao	(Chad) Abdallah Abdelrazakh	(Chad) Faisal Youssef	(Mauritania) Dominique Da Sylva	
Al-Ghazwa	(Egypt) Abdallah El Sanghawy	(Egypt) Hesham Shaaban	(Egypt) Mohamed Fawzi Gaber	
Al-Hada	(Algeria) Sid Ahmed Aouadj	(Brazil) Vanílson	(Morocco) Mouad Chougag	
Al-Hedaya	(Cameroon) Ravel Djoumekou	(Ghana) Prince Owusu	(Tunisia) Houssem Eddine Tabboubi	
Al-Hilaliyah	(Niger) Abdullah Barnawi	(Senegal) Mame Balla Diop	(Yemen) Saleh Badhris	
Al-Khaldi	(Ghana) Daniel Aryeetey			(Ghana) Robert Saba (Yemen) Hamad Salmeen
Al-Mehmal	(Japan) Hiroto Kaneka	(Japan) Ryosuke Nakajima	(Japan) Yamato Kline	
Al-Muzahimiyyah	(Mali) Adam Dembélé	(Togo) **Hunlede Kissimbo**		(Rwanda) Yves Mugunga (Tunisia) Rayan Fourgi
Al-Nahda	(Brazil) Carlos Henrique	(Tunisia) Fehmi Kacem		(Brazil) Patrick Carvalho
Al-Nairyah	(Cameroon) Wilfried Bisso'o	(Guinea) Mohamed Almamy Camara	(Tunisia) Seifeddine Akremi	
Al-Nakhal	(Nigeria) Habib Hawsawi	(Tunisia) Firas Makni	(Tunisia) Hassan Chelli	
Al-Noor	(Ghana) Samuel Ofori	(Tunisia) Houssem Bedbabis	(Tunisia) Mohamed Amine Tayari	
Al-Omran	(Mali) Mahamadou Traoré	(Tunisia) Azer Ghali	(Tunisia) Mohamed Jaballah	
Al-Qala	(Brazil) Rayllan Bruno	(Mauritania) Mohamed Salem Dianos	(Tunisia) Sabri Zaidi	
Al-Qawarah	(Egypt) **Sokrat**	(Mali) Yaqoub Alhassan	(Sudan) **Ayoub Nahar**	(Egypt) Mahmoud Bassalah (Egypt) Mohamed Fathy Saad
Al-Salam	(Brazil) **Vinicius Fernandes**	(Nigeria) **Charles Ikechukwu**	(Rwanda) **Yves Mugunga**	(Ghana) Marlle Habila (Morocco) Abderrahim Makran (Nigeria) Raphael Osaluwe
Al-Selmiyah	(Mauritania) Mohamed M'Bareck	(Tunisia) Houssem Lahbibi		(Morocco) Anouar El Azizi
Al-Shaeib	(Brazil) **Jeferson**	(Colombia) Robinson Blandón		(The Gambia) Babou Cham (South Africa) Bantu Mzwakali
Al-Taraf	(Cameroon) Mamoudou Hassana	(Ivory Coast) Angenor Gnapi	(Ivory Coast) Guessan Bi Germain	
Al-Tuhami	(Ghana) **Benjamín Asamoah**	(Ghana) **Siddiq Kamal**	(Ghana) Maxwell Quaye	(Ghana) Abasa Aremeyaw (Ghana) Rubben Boateng
Al-Watani	(Egypt) **Mohamed El Negely**	(Tunisia) Alaeddine Bouslimi	(Tunisia) Zied Ben Salem	(Libya) Akram Zuway
Al-Yarmouk	(Cameroon) **Félix Koné**	(Cameroon) Lavissa Monyuytaah	(Ivory Coast) Konan Ahuie	(Senegal) Moussa Sow
Baish	(Algeria) Mustapha Kheiraoui	(Egypt) Ahmed Afifi	(Egypt) Omar Bassam	
Haql	(Egypt) Mahmoud Abd El Azeem	(Egypt) Mohamad Awadh	(Egypt) Mohamad Sameh	
Jubbah	(Brazil) Gerônimo	(Nigeria) Bobby Clement	(Tunisia) Maher Labidi	
Muhayil				(Egypt) Hesham Noah (Egypt) Karim Samir (Egypt) Hassan Trika
Munief	(Algeria) Sofiane Khelili	(Tunisia) Bahaeddine Brahmi	(Tunisia) Louay Ben Dahnous	
Qaryat Al-Ulya	(Brazil) Wesley Simeão	(Nigeria) Daniel Nosike		(Nigeria) Blessing Henshaw
Qilwah	(Ghana) Bernard Arthur	(Ivory Coast) Mohamed Vieira Sanogo	(Tunisia) Oussama Omrani	
Radwa	(Brazil) Bruno Grassi	(Yemen) Nader Sahal	(Zambia) Saith Sakala	
Sajer	(Egypt) Salah Khattab	(Tunisia) Haroun Ayari		(Tunisia) Mouhab Touati
Sharurah	(Sudan) Mohammed Aba Yazid	(Yemen) Abdullah Al-Saadi		(Egypt) Ahmed Turk

== Group A ==
=== League table ===
Pos	Team	Pld	W	D	L	GF	GA	GD	Pts	Promotion, qualification or relegation
1	Jubbah (P)	18	10	5	3	27	14	+13	35	Promotion to the Second Division and qualification to the semi-finals
2	Al-Hada	18	8	7	3	23	13	+10	31	
3	Al-Hilaliyah	18	8	6	4	22	15	+7	30 (Note: Al-Hilaliyah finished ahead of Radwa on head-to-head goal difference: Al-Hilaliyah +2 GD, Radwa –2 GD (Radwa 1–0 Al-Hilaliyah, Al-Hilaliyah 4–1 Radwa).)	
4	Radwa	18	7	9	2	18	8	+10	30	
5	Al-Nahda	18	8	5	5	28	21	+7	29	
6	Munief	18	7	5	6	25	26	−1	26	
7	Al-Muzahimiyyah	18	7	1	10	18	28	−10	22	
8	Muhayil	18	4	7	7	21	26	−5	19	
9	Al-Shaeib	18	5	3	10	20	27	−7	18	
10	Al-Hedaya (R)	18	0	4	14	8	32	−24	4	Relegation to the Fourth Division

Updated to match(es) played on 28 February 2025. Source: Goalzz
Rules for classification: 1) Points; 2) Head-to-Head points; 3) Head-to-Head goal difference; 4) Head-to-Head goals scored; 5) Total goal difference; 6) Total goals scored; 7) Play-off (only for deciding champion, promotion and relegation).
(P) Promoted; (R) Relegated

=== Results ===
Home \ Away	HAD	HED	HIL	MUZ	NAH	SHA	JUB	MUH	MUN	RAD
Al-Hada		3–1	0–0	3–2	0–1	0–0	1–1	3–0	1–0	0–0
Al-Hedaya	0–0		0–1	0–1	1–5	0–1	0–2	1–1	1–2	0–3
Al-Hilaliyah	4–3	3–1		0–2	0–0	3–1	0–2	2–0	1–2	4–1
Al-Muzahimiyyah	0–0	2–0	0–1		1–5	2–0	0–1	3–1	2–0	0–2
Al-Nahda	0–2	0–0	1–1	1–0		2–1	2–3	1–0	1–1	0–1
Al-Shaeib	0–3	2–0	1–1	4–1	3–0		0–2	2–4	0–2	0–0
Jubbah	4–0	1–0	0–1	1–2	2–3	3–2		1–0	1–0	0–0
Muhayil	0–2	2–1	0–0	2–0	2–2	2–0	2–2		3–4	0–0
Munief	0–2	3–2	0–0	4–0	3–2	1–3	1–1	1–1		0–4
Radwa	0–0	0–0	1–0	3–0	0–2	1–0	0–0	1–1	1–1	

Updated to match(es) played on 28 February 2025. Source: kooora.com
Legend: Blue = home team win; Yellow = draw; Red = away team win.
For upcoming matches, an "a" indicates there is an article about the rivalry between the two participants.

== Group B ==
=== League table ===
Pos	Team	Pld	W	D	L	GF	GA	GD	Pts	Promotion, qualification or relegation
1	Afif (P)	18	12	4	2	29	13	+16	40	Promotion to the Second Division and qualification to the semi-finals
2	Baish	18	8	8	2	20	14	+6	32	
3	Al-Selmiyah	18	9	3	6	25	15	+10	30 (Note: Al-Selmiyah finished ahead of Sajer on overall goal difference: Al-Selmiyah +10, Sajer +2 (Sajer 0–2 Al-Selmiyah, Al-Selmiyah 0–2 Sajer).)	
4	Sajer	18	8	6	4	20	18	+2	30	
5	Al-Asyah	18	8	3	7	27	23	+4	27	
6	Al-Qwarah	18	7	4	7	13	15	−2	25 (Note: Al-Qwarah finished ahead of Qaryah Al-Ulya on head-to-head points: Al-Qwarah: 6 pts, Qaryah Al-Ulya: 0 pts (Al-Qwarah 1–0 Qaryah Al-Ulya, Qaryah Al-Ulya 0–1 Al-Qwarah).)	
7	Qaryah Al-Ulya	18	7	4	7	22	24	−2	25	
8	Al-Fadhl	18	5	4	9	23	20	+3	19	
9	Al-Bateen	18	4	5	9	17	26	−9	17	
10	Al-Amjad (R)	18	0	3	15	12	40	−28	3	Relegation to the Fourth Division

Updated to match(es) played on 28 February 2025. Source: Goalzz
Rules for classification: 1) Points; 2) Head-to-Head points; 3) Head-to-Head goal difference; 4) Head-to-Head goals scored; 5) Total goal difference; 6) Total goals scored; 7) Play-off (only for deciding champion, promotion and relegation).
(P) Promoted; (R) Relegated

=== Results ===
Home \ Away	AFI	AMJ	ASY	BAT	FAD	QAW	SEL	BAI	QAR	SAJ
Afif		2–0	1–0	2–1	1–1	1–0	2–0	3–0	2–1	2–0
Al-Amjad	1–2		2–4	2–3	0–1	0–1	1–3	0–1	2–3	1–2
Al-Asyah	1–2	3–2		4–1	1–1	2–1	2–1	3–3	1–2	0–2
Al-Bateen	2–2	0–0	0–2		0–1	1–2	2–0	0–1	4–0	1–2
Al-Fadhl	1–2	8–0	1–0	3–1		1–2	0–1	0–1	1–1	0–0
Al-Qwarah	1–3	1–1	0–1	0–0	1–0		0–2	1–0	1–0	1–1
Al-Selmiyah	1–0	2–0	0–1	5–0	2–1	0–0		0–0	1–2	0–2
Baish	1–0	0–0	2–1	0–0	2–1	1–0	2–2		0–0	1–1
Qaryah Al-Ulya	0–0	3–0	2–1	0–1	3–2	0–1	0–3	1–1		0–1
Sajer	2–2	1–0	0–0	0–0	2–0	1–0	0–2	1–4	2–4	

Updated to match(es) played on 28 February 2025. Source: kooora.com
Legend: Blue = home team win; Yellow = draw; Red = away team win.
For upcoming matches, an "a" indicates there is an article about the rivalry between the two participants.

== Group C ==
=== League table ===
Pos	Team	Pld	W	D	L	GF	GA	GD	Pts	Promotion, qualification or relegation
1	Al-Qala (C, P)	18	12	3	3	40	14	+26	39	Promotion to the Second Division and qualification to the semi-finals
2	Al-Watani	18	11	0	7	30	16	+14	33	
3	Al-Tuhami	18	9	5	4	38	29	+9	32	
4	Al-Yarmouk	18	9	3	6	38	32	+6	30	
5	Al-Fao	18	8	4	6	26	36	−10	28	
6	Qilwah	18	7	5	6	28	17	+11	26	
7	Al-Noor	18	6	4	8	24	27	−3	22	
8	Al-Dera'a	18	4	7	7	23	22	+1	19	
9	Al-Dahab	18	4	4	10	19	35	−16	16	
10	Al-Salam (R)	18	1	3	14	10	48	−38	6	Relegation to the Fourth Division

Updated to match(es) played on 27 February 2025. Source: Goalzz
Rules for classification: 1) Points; 2) Head-to-Head points; 3) Head-to-Head goal difference; 4) Head-to-Head goals scored; 5) Total goal difference; 6) Total goals scored; 7) Play-off (only for deciding champion, promotion and relegation).
(C) Champions; (P) Promoted; (R) Relegated

=== Results ===
Home \ Away	DAH	DER	FAO	NOR	QAL	SAL	TUH	WAT	YAR	QIL
Al-Dahab		1–1	2–2	2–3	0–0	2–1	2–1	1–4	1–2	3–1
Al-Dera'a	3–0		4–1	3–2	0–0	5–1	2–2	0–2	1–1	0–1
Al-Fao	0–2	1–0		0–1	1–0	2–2	1–2	1–0	5–4	1–0
Al-Noor	2–1	0–0	0–0		1–3	5–0	3–6	2–1	0–1	0–1
Al-Qala	4–1	3–1	7–1	1–0		2–0	6–1	1–0	5–2	2–0
Al-Salam	0–0	0–0	1–4	1–2	0–3		0–1	1–4	1–7	1–0
Al-Tuhami	1–0	2–1	2–2	1–1	3–0	7–1		1–0	1–5	1–1
Al-Watani	4–1	1–0	0–1	3–1	0–1	1–0	2–1		1–2	2–1
Al-Yarmouk	1–0	1–1	2–3	3–1	1–0	2–0	1–4	1–4		2–2
Qilwah	5–0	3–1	7–0	0–0	2–2	1–0	1–1	0–1	2–0	

Updated to match(es) played on 27 February 2025. Source: kooora.com
Legend: Blue = home team win; Yellow = draw; Red = away team win.
For upcoming matches, an "a" indicates there is an article about the rivalry between the two participants.

== Group D ==
=== League table ===
Pos	Team	Pld	W	D	L	GF	GA	GD	Pts	Promotion, qualification or relegation
1	Al-Nairyah (P)	18	13	3	2	33	13	+20	42	Promotion to the Second Division and qualification to the semi-finals
2	Haql	18	12	4	2	35	18	+17	40	
3	Al-Nakhal	18	10	3	5	34	22	+12	33	
4	Sharurah	18	7	3	8	24	27	−3	24	
5	Al-Ghazwa	18	5	6	7	24	24	0	21 (Note: Al-Ghazwa finished ahead of Al-Omran on head-to-head points: Al-Ghazwa: 4 pts, Al-Omran: 1 pts (Al-Omran 0–0 Al-Ghazwa, Al-Ghazwa 3–0 Al-Omran).)	
6	Al-Omran	18	5	6	7	19	22	−3	21	
7	Al-Mehmal	18	6	2	10	14	21	−7	20	
8	Al-Eetemad	18	3	8	7	21	27	−6	17 (Note: Al-Eetemad finished ahead of Al-Khaldi on head-to-head points: Al-Eetemad: 4 pts, Al-Khaldi: 1 pts (Al-Khaldi 1–1 Al-Eetemad, Al-Eetemad 3–0 Al-Khaldi).)	
9	Al-Khaldi	18	4	5	9	19	30	−11	17	
10	Al-Taraf (R)	18	3	4	11	15	34	−19	13	Relegation to the Fourth Division

Updated to match(es) played on 27 February 2025. Source: Goalzz
Rules for classification: 1) Points; 2) Head-to-Head points; 3) Head-to-Head goal difference; 4) Head-to-Head goals scored; 5) Total goal difference; 6) Total goals scored; 7) Play-off (only for deciding champion, promotion and relegation).
(P) Promoted; (R) Relegated

=== Results ===
Home \ Away	EET	GHA	KHA	MEH	NAI	NAK	OMR	TAR	HAQ	SHA
Al-Eetemad		2–2	3–0	0–1	1–1	2–2	1–2	2–0	2–2	1–1
Al-Ghazwa	1–1		1–1	2–0	0–1	1–1	3–0	2–0	2–3	3–0
Al-Khaldi	1–1	4–1		1–0	0–2	1–2	3–3	2–0	0–1	0–0
Al-Mehmal	2–1	0–1	3–0		0–1	0–0	0–3	0–1	0–1	1–1
Al-Nairyah	2–1	2–1	2–0	3–0		0–3	3–2	4–1	0–0	5–0
Al-Nakhal	2–1	3–2	3–4	0–1	0–1		4–2	4–0	1–3	2–0
Al-Omran	0–0	0–0	2–0	1–2	0–0	0–2		2–2	0–0	0–1
Al-Taraf	0–1	1–1	0–0	3–1	0–3	0–1	0–1		0–3	2–1
Haql	5–1	3–0	2–1	0–3	2–0	2–1	0–1	4–4		2–1
Sharurah	3–0	2–1	4–1	2–0	2–3	2–3	1–0	2–1	1–2	

Updated to match(es) played on 27 February 2025. Source: kooora.com
Legend: Blue = home team win; Yellow = draw; Red = away team win.
For upcoming matches, an "a" indicates there is an article about the rivalry between the two participants.

== Play-offs ==
=== Championship play-offs ===
==== Semi-finals ====
7 March 2025
22:00 UTC+3

Afif	1–3	Jubbah
Al-Otaibi 51'		Al-Salhi 29' (o.g.); Gerônimo 84'; Clement 90+4'

Afif Club Stadium, Afif
7 March 2025
22:00 UTC+3

Al-Nairyah	1–2	Al-Qala
Camara 12'		Zaidi 68'; Al-Haizan 72'

Prince Nayef bin Abdulaziz Stadium, Qatif

==== Final ====
14 March 2025
22:00 UTC+3

Al-Qala	1–0	Jubbah
Rayllan 71'	Report

Al-Orobah Club Stadium, Sakakah

== Statistics ==
=== Top scorers ===
As of 14 March 2025

Rank	Player	Club	Goals
1	(Ghana) Maxwell Quaye	Al-Tuhami	18
2	(Brazil) Rayllan Bruno	Al-Qala	17
3	(Egypt) Mohamad Awadh	Haql	16
4	(Nigeria) Bobby Clement	Jubbah	13
5	(Saudi Arabia) Radwan Hawsawi	Al-Fao/Qilwah	11
5	(Saudi Arabia) Jawad Al-Luwaim	Al-Fadhl	11
5	(Guinea) Mohamed Camara	Al-Nairyah	11
8	(Tunisia) Louay Ben Dahnous	Munief	10
8	(Senegal) Moussa Sow	Al-Yarmouk/Al-Asyah	10
8	(Saudi Arabia) Abdullah Abalkhail	Al-Hilaliyah	10

==== Hat-tricks ====
Player	For	Against	Result	Date	Ref.
(Ghana) Maxwell Quaye	Al-Tuhami	Al-Salam	7–1 (H)	2 November 2024	
(Saudi Arabia) Ahmed Qohmi	Al-Tuhami	Al-Salam	7–1 (H)	2 November 2024	
(Saudi Arabia) Abdullah Abalkhail	Al-Hilaliyah	Al-Hada	4–3 (H)	21 November 2024	
(Tunisia) Louay Ben Dahnous	Munief	Al-Muzahimiyyah	4–0 (H)	14 December 2024	
(Brazil) Vanílson	Al-Hada	Al-Hedaya	3–1 (H)	15 December 2024	
(Ghana) Maxwell Quaye	Al-Tuhami	Al-Qala	3–0 (H)	20 December 2024	
(Tunisia) Louay Ben Dahnous	Munief	Muhayil	4–3 (A)	10 January 2025	
(Saudi Arabia) Jawad Al-Luwaim^{5}	Al-Fadhl	Al-Amjad	8–0 (H)	8 February 2025	
(Ghana) Maxwell Quaye	Al-Tuhami	Al-Noor	6–3 (A)	14 February 2025	
(Mauritania) Fody Traoré	Al-Eetemad	Al-Khaldi	3–0 (H)	14 February 2025	
(Chad) Faisal Youssef	Al-Fao	Al-Yarmouk	5–4 (H)	27 February 2025	
(Brazil) Rayllan Bruno	Al-Qala	Al-Tuhami	6–1 (H)	27 February 2025	

Note

(H) – Home; (A) – Away
^{4} Player scored 4 goals; ^{5} Player scored 5 goals

== Number of teams by province ==
Rank	Province	Number	Teams
1	Eastern Province	10	Al-Fadhl, Al-Hada, Al-Hedaya, Al-Nahda, Al-Nairyah, Al-Noor, Al-Omran, Al-Salam, Al-Taraf and Qaryah Al-Ulya
1	Riyadh	10	Afif, Al-Bateen, Al-Dera'a, Al-Eetemad, Al-Fao, Al-Mehmal, Al-Muzahimiyyah, Al-Selmiyah, Al-Shaeib and Sajer
3	Jazan	4	Al-Amjad, Al-Tuhami, Al-Yarmouk and Baish
3	Medina	4	Al-Dahab, Al-Ghazwa, Al-Nakhal and Radwa
5	Al-Qassim	3	Al-Asyah, Al-Hilaliyah and Al-Qwarah
5	Tabuk	3	Al-Khaldi, Al-Watani and Haql
7	Al-Bahah	1	Qilwah
7	Al-Jawf	1	Al-Qala
7	Asir	1	Muhayil
7	Ha'il	1	Jubbah
7	Mecca	1	Munief
7	Najran	1	Sharurah

== See also ==
- 2024–25 Saudi Pro League
- 2024–25 Saudi First Division League
- 2024–25 Saudi Second Division League
