= 2021–22 Saudi Third Division =

1st season of the Saudi Third Division

Saudi Third Division
- Season: 2021–22
- Dates: 28 October 2021 – 19 March 2022
- Champions: Al-Suqoor (1st title)
- Promoted: Al-Suqoor; Al-Qous; Jerash; Sajer; Qilwah; Al-Shaeib
- Relegated: Al-Fursan; Kumait; Al-Entelaq; Al-Fao
- Matches: 231
- Goals: 563 (2.44 per match)
- Top goalscorer: Hamed Al-Shammeri (12 goals)
- Biggest home win: Radwa 7–0 Al-Fao (5 March 2022)
- Biggest away win: Al-Mujazzal 0–4 Radwa (30 October 2021); Al-Fao 0–4 Radwa (12 December 2021)
- Highest scoring: Al-Entelaq 4–4 Al-Selmiyah (21 November 2021)
- Longest winning run: Al-Suqoor; Qilwah; Sajer (6 matches)
- Longest unbeaten run: Al-Qous (15 matches)
- Longest winless run: Kumait (11 matches)
- Longest losing run: Al-Ula; Kumait (6 matches)
- All statistics correct as of 19 March 2022.

The 2021–22 Saudi Third Division was the inaugural season of the Saudi Third Division, the newly introduced fourth tier of Saudi football. The season started on 28 October 2021 and concluded with the final on 19 March 2022. The group stage draw was held on 7 June 2021. The league was made up of 32 teams, 4 relegated teams from the 2020–21 Saudi Second Division and the 28 teams that qualified for the Round of 32 of the 2020–21 Saudi Third Division.

The final was played on 19 March 2022 between Al-Qous and Al-Suqoor. Al-Suqoor defeated Al-Qous 2–1 to become the inaugural champions.

== Overview ==
=== Background ===
On 9 October 2020, the Saudi FF announced the introduction of the Saudi Third Division starting from the 2021–22 season. The newly introduced league would replace the Regional Leagues as the fourth tier of the Saudi football league system. They announced that the league would comprise 32 teams, the 28 teams that had qualified to the round of 32 of the Regional Leagues and did not achieve promotion to the 2021–22 Saudi Second Division and the 4 relegated teams from the 2020–21 Saudi Second Division.

The 32 teams would be split into 4 groups of 8 teams, with the winners of each group qualifying for the championship play-offs. In addition, the 4 group runners-up would also qualify for the promotion play-offs. The best runner-up would face the worst runner-up and the second best would face the third best. The winners from both matches would also earn promotion to the Second Division. The last-placed team of each group would be the one to get relegated.

== Teams ==
;Group A

Locations of teams in the 2021–22 Saudi Third Division Group A

| Club | Location | Stadium |
|---|---|---|
| Al-Bateen | Dhurma | Al-Bateen Club Stadium |
| Al-Ghottah | Mawqaq | Al-Jabalain Club Stadium (Ha'il) |
| Al-Houra | Umluj | Al-Houra Club Stadium |
| Al-Ula | Al-'Ula | Al-Ansar Club Stadium (Medina) |
| Jerash | Ahad Rafidah | Prince Sultan bin Abdul Aziz Reserve Stadium (Abha) |
| Kumait | Marat | Kumait Club Stadium |
| Mudhar | Qatif | Prince Nayef bin Abdulaziz Stadium |
| Qilwah | Qilwah | Qilwah Club Stadium |

Group B

Locations of teams in the 2021–22 Saudi Third Division Group B

| Club | Location | Stadium |
|---|---|---|
| Al-Anwar | Hotat Bani Tamim | Al-Anwar Club Stadium |
| Al-Dera'a | Dawadmi | Al-Dera'a Club Stadium |
| Al-Fursan | Sarat Ubaida | Al-Fursan Club Stadium |
| Al-Hejaz | Baljurashi | King Saud Sport City Stadium (Al Bahah) |
| Al-Jubail | Jubail | Al-Jubail Club Stadium |
| Al-Shaheed | Muhayil | Al-Shaheed Club Stadium |
| Al-Suqoor | Tabuk | King Khalid Sport City Stadium |
| Baish | Baish | Baish Club Stadium |

Group C

Locations of teams in the 2021–22 Saudi Third Division Group C

| Club | Location | Stadium |
|---|---|---|
| Al-Fao | Wadi ad-Dawasir | Prince Nasser bin Abdul Aziz Sports City |
| Al-Mujazzal | Al Majma'ah | Al-Hamadah Club Stadium (Al-Ghat) |
| Al-Noor | Sanabes | Prince Nayef bin Abdulaziz Stadium (Qatif) |
| Al-Qala | Sakakah | Al-Qala Club Stadium |
| Qaryah Al-Ulya | Qaryat al-Ulya | Qaryah Al-Ulya Club Stadium |
| Radwa | Yanbu | Al-Majd Club Stadium |
| Sajer | Sajir | Al-Washm Club Stadium (Shaqra) |
| Sharurah | Sharurah | Sharurah Club Stadium |

Group D

Locations of teams in the 2021–22 Saudi Third Division Group D

| Club | Location | Stadium |
|---|---|---|
| Al-Amjad | Sabya | King Faisal Sport City Stadium (Jizan) |
| Al-Entelaq | Qara | Al-Orobah Club Stadium (Sakakah) |
| Al-Omran | Al-Hasa (Al-Omran) | Hajer Club Stadium |
| Al-Qawarah | Al Quwarah | Al-Qawarah Club Stadium |
| Al-Qous | Al Khurmah | Al-Qous Club Stadium |
| Al-Selmiyah | Al-Salamiyah | Al-Anwar Club Stadium (Hotat Bani Tamim) |
| Al-Shaeib | Huraymila | Irqah Sports Stadium (Riyadh) |
| Al-Watani | Tabuk | King Khalid Sport City Stadium |

== Group A ==
=== League table ===
| Pos | Team | Pld | W | D | L | GF | GA | GD | Pts | Promotion, qualification or relegation |
|---|---|---|---|---|---|---|---|---|---|---|
| 1 | Jerash (P) | 14 | 10 | 0 | 4 | 18 | 12 | +6 | 30 (Note: Positions determined by head-to-head points: Jerash: 9 pts; Qilwah: 6 pts; Mudhar: 3 pts.) | Promotion to the Second Division and qualification to the Semi-finals |
| 2 | Qilwah (P) | 14 | 9 | 3 | 2 | 19 | 10 | +9 | 30 | Qualification for the promotion play-offs |
| 3 | Mudhar | 14 | 10 | 0 | 4 | 24 | 10 | +14 | 30 | |
| 4 | Al-Ghottah | 14 | 5 | 3 | 6 | 15 | 19 | −4 | 18 | |
| 5 | Al-Bateen | 14 | 5 | 2 | 7 | 17 | 21 | −4 | 17 | |
| 6 | Al-Ula | 14 | 4 | 2 | 8 | 13 | 24 | −11 | 14 | |
| 7 | Al-Houra | 14 | 4 | 1 | 9 | 19 | 20 | −1 | 13 | |
| 8 | Kumait (R) | 14 | 1 | 5 | 8 | 15 | 24 | −9 | 8 | Relegation to the Fourth Division |

Updated to match(es) played on 3 March 2022. Source: Goalzz
Rules for classification: 1) Points; 2) Head-to-Head points; 3) Head-to-Head goal difference; 4) Head-to-Head goals scored; 5) Total goal difference; 6) Total goals scored; 7) Play-off (only for deciding champion, promotion and relegation).
(P) Promoted; (R) Relegated

=== Results ===
| Home \ Away | BAT | GHO | HOU | ULA | JER | KUM | MUD | QIL |
|---|---|---|---|---|---|---|---|---|
| Al-Bateen | | 2–1 | 0–3 | 1–2 | 2–0 | 1–1 | 1–0 | 0–2 |
| Al-Ghottah | 3–2 | | 2–1 | 1–0 | 1–2 | 1–0 | 1–4 | 1–1 |
| Al-Houra | 0–1 | 0–0 | | 3–1 | 1–2 | 3–1 | 1–2 | 1–2 |
| Al-Ula | 0–3 | 0–1 | 2–1 | | 1–0 | 3–2 | 0–2 | 0–0 |
| Jerash | 3–0 | 1–0 | 2–1 | 3–1 | | 0–3 | 1–0 | 1–0 |
| Kumait | 3–3 | 2–2 | 0–2 | 1–1 | 0–2 | | 0–1 | 0–1 |
| Mudhar | 1–0 | 2–0 | 3–1 | 3–1 | 2–0 | 3–1 | | 0–1 |
| Qilwah | 2–1 | 2–1 | 2–1 | 3–1 | 0–1 | 1–1 | 2–1 | |

Updated to match(es) played on 3 March 2022. Source: saff.com.sa
Legend: Blue = home team win; Yellow = draw; Red = away team win.
For upcoming matches, an "a" indicates there is an article about the rivalry between the two participants.

== Group B ==
=== League table ===
| Pos | Team | Pld | W | D | L | GF | GA | GD | Pts | Promotion, qualification or relegation |
|---|---|---|---|---|---|---|---|---|---|---|
| 1 | Al-Suqoor (C, P) | 14 | 9 | 3 | 2 | 25 | 16 | +9 | 30 | Promotion to the Second Division and qualification to the Semi-finals |
| 2 | Al-Jubail | 14 | 7 | 3 | 4 | 20 | 13 | +7 | 24 | Qualification for the promotion play-offs |
| 3 | Baish | 14 | 6 | 5 | 3 | 21 | 12 | +9 | 23 | |
| 4 | Al-Anwar | 14 | 5 | 2 | 7 | 13 | 18 | −5 | 17 | |
| 5 | Al-Shaheed | 14 | 4 | 4 | 6 | 12 | 17 | −5 | 16 | |
| 6 | Al-Dera'a | 14 | 2 | 8 | 4 | 10 | 15 | −5 | 14 (Note: Al-Dera'a finished ahead of Al-Hejaz and Al-Fursan on head-to-head points: Al-Dera'a: 8 pts; Al-Hejaz: 4 pts; Al-Fursan: 4 pts. Al-Hejaz finished ahead of Al-Fursan on head-to-head goal difference: Al-Hejaz 0, Al-Fursan –3.) | |
| 7 | Al-Hejaz | 14 | 4 | 2 | 8 | 14 | 20 | −6 | 14 | |
| 8 | Al-Fursan (R) | 14 | 3 | 5 | 6 | 11 | 15 | −4 | 14 | Relegation to the Fourth Division |

Updated to match(es) played on 4 March 2022. Source: Goalzz
Rules for classification: 1) Points; 2) Head-to-Head points; 3) Head-to-Head goal difference; 4) Head-to-Head goals scored; 5) Total goal difference; 6) Total goals scored; 7) Play-off (only for deciding champion, promotion and relegation).
(C) Champions; (P) Promoted; (R) Relegated

=== Results ===
| Home \ Away | ANW | DER | FUR | HEJ | JUB | SHA | SUQ | BAI |
|---|---|---|---|---|---|---|---|---|
| Al-Anwar | | 1–1 | 1–0 | 0–1 | 1–3 | 0–1 | 0–1 | 1–1 |
| Al-Dera'a | 0–3 | | 3–1 | 1–0 | 1–1 | 1–1 | 1–1 | 0–2 |
| Al-Fursan | 0–1 | 1–1 | | 0–2 | 0–0 | 0–0 | 2–2 | 0–0 |
| Al-Hejaz | 1–0 | 0–0 | 0–1 | | 0–1 | 1–0 | 1–2 | 0–3 |
| Al-Jubail | 3–0 | 1–1 | 2–1 | 4–2 | | 1–0 | 0–1 | 2–0 |
| Al-Shaheed | 1–2 | 2–0 | 0–2 | 3–2 | 2–1 | | 1–1 | 0–1 |
| Al-Suqoor | 5–1 | 1–0 | 3–2 | 2–1 | 1–0 | 4–0 | | 1–3 |
| Baish | 0–2 | 0–0 | 0–1 | 3–3 | 3–1 | 1–1 | 4–0 | |

Updated to match(es) played on 4 March 2022. Source: saff.com.sa
Legend: Blue = home team win; Yellow = draw; Red = away team win.
For upcoming matches, an "a" indicates there is an article about the rivalry between the two participants.

== Group C ==
=== League table ===
| Pos | Team | Pld | W | D | L | GF | GA | GD | Pts | Promotion, qualification or relegation |
|---|---|---|---|---|---|---|---|---|---|---|
| 1 | Sajer (P) | 14 | 8 | 5 | 1 | 17 | 5 | +12 | 29 | Promotion to the Second Division and qualification to the Semi-finals |
| 2 | Al-Qala | 14 | 8 | 4 | 2 | 17 | 10 | +7 | 28 | Qualification for the promotion play-offs |
| 3 | Qaryah Al-Ulya | 14 | 7 | 4 | 3 | 21 | 12 | +9 | 25 | |
| 4 | Radwa | 14 | 7 | 1 | 6 | 24 | 10 | +14 | 22 | |
| 5 | Sharurah | 14 | 4 | 8 | 2 | 17 | 15 | +2 | 20 | |
| 6 | Al-Noor | 14 | 3 | 4 | 7 | 16 | 22 | −6 | 13 | |
| 7 | Al-Mujazzal | 14 | 2 | 4 | 8 | 8 | 21 | −13 | 10 | |
| 8 | Al-Fao (R) | 14 | 1 | 2 | 11 | 4 | 29 | −25 | 5 | Relegation to the Fourth Division |

Updated to match(es) played on 5 March 2022. Source: Goalzz
Rules for classification: 1) Points; 2) Head-to-Head points; 3) Head-to-Head goal difference; 4) Head-to-Head goals scored; 5) Total goal difference; 6) Total goals scored; 7) Play-off (only for deciding champion, promotion and relegation).
(P) Promoted; (R) Relegated

=== Results ===
| Home \ Away | FAO | MUJ | NOR | QAL | QAR | RAD | SAJ | SHA |
|---|---|---|---|---|---|---|---|---|
| Al-Fao | | 2–0 | 0–2 | 0–1 | 1–2 | 0–4 | 0–1 | 0–3 |
| Al-Mujazzal | 0–0 | | 2–0 | 0–1 | 1–4 | 0–4 | 1–1 | 0–0 |
| Al-Noor | 1–0 | 1–0 | | 1–2 | 2–4 | 1–2 | 0–1 | 2–2 |
| Al-Qala | 2–0 | 2–2 | 3–2 | | 0–1 | 1–0 | 0–1 | 0–0 |
| Qaryah Al-Ulya | 2–0 | 1–0 | 4–2 | 1–1 | | 0–1 | 1–1 | 1–1 |
| Radwa | 7–0 | 0–1 | 1–1 | 0–1 | 1–0 | | 0–1 | 3–0 |
| Sajer | 4–1 | 2–0 | 0–0 | 0–1 | 0–0 | 1–0 | | 3–0 |
| Sharurah | 0–0 | 3–1 | 1–1 | 2–2 | 1–0 | 3–1 | 1–1 | |

Updated to match(es) played on 5 March 2022. Source: saff.com.sa
Legend: Blue = home team win; Yellow = draw; Red = away team win.
For upcoming matches, an "a" indicates there is an article about the rivalry between the two participants.

== Group D ==
=== League table ===
| Pos | Team | Pld | W | D | L | GF | GA | GD | Pts | Promotion, qualification or relegation |
|---|---|---|---|---|---|---|---|---|---|---|
| 1 | Al-Qous (P) | 14 | 8 | 6 | 0 | 21 | 9 | +12 | 30 | Promotion to the Second Division and qualification to the Semi-finals |
| 2 | Al-Shaeib (P) | 14 | 6 | 6 | 2 | 28 | 21 | +7 | 24 (Note: Al-Shaeib finished ahead of Al-Qawarah on head-to-head points: Al-Shaeib 1–0 Al-Qawarah, Al-Qawarah 2–2 Al-Shaeib.) | Qualification for the promotion play-offs |
| 3 | Al-Qawarah | 14 | 7 | 3 | 4 | 19 | 14 | +5 | 24 | |
| 4 | Al-Watani | 14 | 7 | 2 | 5 | 24 | 15 | +9 | 23 | |
| 5 | Al-Amjad | 14 | 4 | 4 | 6 | 18 | 25 | −7 | 16 | |
| 6 | Al-Selmiyah | 14 | 2 | 8 | 4 | 20 | 25 | −5 | 14 | |
| 7 | Al-Omran | 14 | 3 | 3 | 8 | 16 | 20 | −4 | 12 | |
| 8 | Al-Entelaq (R) | 14 | 1 | 4 | 9 | 15 | 32 | −17 | 7 | Relegation to the Fourth Division |

Updated to match(es) played on 6 March 2022. Source: Goalzz
Rules for classification: 1) Points; 2) Head-to-Head points; 3) Head-to-Head goal difference; 4) Head-to-Head goals scored; 5) Total goal difference; 6) Total goals scored; 7) Play-off (only for deciding champion, promotion and relegation).
(P) Promoted; (R) Relegated

=== Results ===
| Home \ Away | AMJ | ENT | OMR | QAW | QOU | SEL | SHA | WAT |
|---|---|---|---|---|---|---|---|---|
| Al-Amjad | | 3–0 | 2–0 | 0–2 | 0–1 | 1–1 | 1–1 | 2–1 |
| Al-Entelaq | 3–1 | | 1–3 | 1–4 | 0–1 | 4–4 | 1–2 | 0–2 |
| Al-Omran | 5–1 | 0–0 | | 1–1 | 1–2 | 1–2 | 1–3 | 0–2 |
| Al-Qawarah | 4–1 | 1–0 | 0–2 | | 0–3 | 2–0 | 2–2 | 2–0 |
| Al-Qous | 3–1 | 2–2 | 1–0 | 0–0 | | 1–1 | 3–1 | 1–0 |
| Al-Selmiyah | 1–1 | 1–1 | 3–1 | 0–1 | 1–1 | | 3–3 | 1–4 |
| Al-Shaeib | 2–2 | 4–0 | 2–1 | 1–0 | 1–1 | 2–2 | | 4–3 |
| Al-Watani | 1–2 | 4–2 | 0–0 | 3–0 | 1–1 | 2–0 | 1–0 | |

Updated to match(es) played on 6 March 2022. Source: saff.com.sa
Legend: Blue = home team win; Yellow = draw; Red = away team win.
For upcoming matches, an "a" indicates there is an article about the rivalry between the two participants.

== Play-offs ==
=== Championship play-offs ===
==== Semi-finals ====
12 March 2022
16:00 UTC+3

| Al-Suqoor | 2–1 | Jerash |
|---|---|---|
| Al-Blwi 1'; Al-Qahtani 90+5' | | M. Al-Qahtani 8' (pen.) |

King Khalid Sport City Stadium, Tabuk
12 March 2022
16:00 UTC+3

| Al-Qous | 2–0 | Sajer |
|---|---|---|
| Al-Shanqiti 29'; Rawas 84' |

Al-Qous Club Stadium, Al Khurmah

==== Final ====
19 March 2022
20:30 UTC+3

| Al-Qous | 1–2 (a.e.t.) | Al-Suqoor |
|---|---|---|
| Darwish 7' | Report | Al-Rashidi 90+1', 100' |

King Fahd Stadium, Taif

=== Promotion play-offs ===
| Team 1 | Agg. | Team 2 | 1st leg | 2nd leg |
|---|---|---|---|---|
| Al-Jubail | 0–0 (7–8 p) | Qilwah | 0–0 | 0–0 (a.e.t.) |
| Al-Shaeib | 3–1 | Al-Qala | 1–1 | 2–0 |

11 March 2022
15:40 UTC+3

| Al-Jubail | 0–0 | Qilwah |

Al-Jubail Club Stadium, Jubail
18 March 2022
16:10 UTC+3

| Qilwah | 0–0 (a.e.t.) | Al-Jubail |
|---|---|---|
| | Report |
Penalties
| (penalty scored); I. Jamaan (penalty scored) (penalty missed); Al-Amri (penalty scored); Al-Zahrani (penalty scored); Al Ghanem (penalty scored); Al-Mandeli (penalty scored); Al-Hayli (penalty scored); Al-Ghamdi (penalty scored) | 8–7 | (penalty scored) Fallatah; (penalty scored) Al-Hamad; (penalty missed) Al-Holaiw; (penalty scored) Hawsawi; (penalty scored) Al-Yami; (penalty scored) Al-Ben Ali; (penalty scored) Al-Talha; (penalty scored) Seraj; (penalty missed) Al-Turki |

Qilwah Club Stadium, Qilwah

0–0 on aggregate. Qilwah won 8–7 on penalties.

11 March 2022
15:55 UTC+3

| Al-Shaeib | 1–1 | Al-Qala |
|---|---|---|
| Dagriri 14' | | Al-Khamis 53' |

Irqah Sports Stadium, Riyadh
18 March 2022
16:10 UTC+3

| Al-Qala | 0–2 | Al-Shaeib |
|---|---|---|
| | Report | Hakami 71'; Hassan 90' |

Al-Orobah Club Stadium, Sakakah

Al-Shaeib won 3–1 on aggregate.

== Statistics ==
=== Top scorers ===
As of 19 March 2022

| Rank | Player | Club | Goals |
|---|---|---|---|
| 1 | (Saudi Arabia) Hamed Al-Shammari | Qaryah Al-Ulya | 12 |
| 2 | (Saudi Arabia) Abdulrahman Moussa Al-Zahrani | Al-Suqoor | 9 |
| 3 | (Saudi Arabia) Naif Abdali | Baish | 8 |
| 4 | (Saudi Arabia) Faisal Al-Lehji | Al-Shaeib | 7 |
| 4 | (Saudi Arabia) Nawaf Asiri | Al-Watani | 7 |
| 4 | (Saudi Arabia) Hani Al-Dhahi | Mudhar | 7 |
| 7 | (Saudi Arabia) Hossam Al-Shathli | Al-Jubail | 6 |
| 7 | (Saudi Arabia) Ali Al-Anbar | Al-Selmiyah | 6 |
| 7 | (Saudi Arabia) Fahad Attiah Al-Rashidi | Al-Suqoor | 6 |
| 7 | (Saudi Arabia) Qassem Al-Jassem | Mudhar | 6 |
| 7 | (Saudi Arabia) Mohammed Jamaan Al-Ghamdi | Qilwah | 6 |
| 7 | (Saudi Arabia) Yousef Allati | Al-Houra | 6 |
| 7 | (Saudi Arabia) Moussa Abbas | Al-Noor | 6 |

==== Hat-tricks ====
| Player | For | Against | Result | Date | Ref. |
|---|---|---|---|---|---|
| (Saudi Arabia) Ali Al-Anbar | Al-Selmiyah | Al-Entelaq | 4–4 (A) | 21 November 2021 | |
| (Saudi Arabia) Naif Abdali | Baish | Al-Hejaz | 3–0 (A) | 3 December 2021 | |
| (Saudi Arabia) Abdulrahman Al-Zahrani | Al-Suqoor | Al-Anwar | 5–1 (H) | 3 December 2021 | |
| (Saudi Arabia) Hamed Al-Shammari | Qaryah Al-Ulya | Al-Noor | 4–2 (H) | 11 December 2021 | |
| (Saudi Arabia) Mazen Al-Johani | Radwa | Al-Fao | 4–0 (A) | 12 December 2021 | |
| (Saudi Arabia) Ali Al-Anbar | Al-Selmiyah | Al-Omran | 3–1 (H) | 30 January 2022 | |
| (Saudi Arabia) Faisal Hassan | Al-Hejaz | Baish | 3–3 (A) | 25 February 2022 | |
| (Saudi Arabia) Hammad Al-Buraiki | Sharurah | Radwa | 3–1 (H) | 26 February 2022 | |
| (Saudi Arabia) Hamed Al-Shammari | Qaryah Al-Ulya | Al-Noor | 4–2 (A) | 5 March 2022 | |
| (Saudi Arabia) Nawaf Asiri | Al-Watani | Al-Selmiyah | 4–1 (A) | 6 March 2022 | |

Note

(H) – Home; (A) – Away

== Number of teams by province ==
| Rank | Province | Number | Teams |
|---|---|---|---|
| 1 | Riyadh | 9 | Al-Anwar, Al-Bateen, Al-Dera'a, Al-Fao, Al-Mujazzal, Al-Selmiyah, Al-Shaeib, Kumait and Sajer |
| 2 | Eastern Province | 5 | Al-Jubail, Al-Noor, Al-Omran, Mudhar and Qaryah Al-Ulya |
| 3 | Asir | 3 | Al-Fursan, Al-Shaheed and Jerash |
| 3 | Tabuk | 3 | Al-Houra, Al-Suqoor and Al-Watani |
| 5 | Al-Bahah | 2 | Al-Hejaz and Qilwah |
| 5 | Al Jawf | 2 | Al-Entelaq and Al-Qala |
| 5 | Jazan | 2 | Al-Amjad and Baish |
| 5 | Medina | 2 | Al-Ula and Radwa |
| 9 | Al-Qassim | 1 | Al-Qawarah |
| 9 | Ha'il | 1 | Al-Ghottah |
| 9 | Mecca | 1 | Al-Qous |
| 9 | Najran | 1 | Sharurah |

== See also ==
- 2021–22 Saudi Professional League
- 2021–22 Saudi First Division League
- 2021–22 Saudi Second Division
