= Galtier =

Galtier is a surname. Notable people with the surname include:

- Christophe Galtier (born 1966), French footballer and manager
- Francis Galtier (born 1907), French sprinter
- Jean Galtier-Boissière (1891-1966), French writer, polemicist and journalist
- Jordan Galtier (born 1989), French footballer and manager
- Lucien Galtier (c. 1811–1866), American Catholic priest
- Pierre-Victor Galtier (1846-1908), French veterinarian
