= Mostafa Al-Abbad =

Saudi Arabian footballer (born 1989)

Personal information
- Full name: Mostafa Mousa Al-Abbad
- Date of birth: October 14, 1989 (age 37)
- Place of birth: Saudi Arabia
- Height: 1.89 m (6 ft 2 1/2 in)
- Position: Goalkeeper

Team information
- Current team: Al-Omran
- Number: 76

Youth career
- Al-Qarah

Senior career*
Years	Team	Apps	(Gls)
2008–2014	Hajer Club		
2014–2017	Al Jeel		
2017–2018	Al-Thoqbah		
2018–2019	Al-Shurooq		
2019–2022	Al-Rawdhah		
2022–	Al-Omran		
- * Club domestic league appearances and goals

Mostafa Al-Abbad (Arabic: مصطفى العباد; born 14 October 1989) is a football player who currently plays for Al-Omran as a goalkeeper.
