= 2012–13 Saudi Second Division =

Saudi Second Division
- Season: 2012–13

The Saudi Second Division is the Third level football competition in Saudi Arabia. Qualified three teams to Saudi First Division.

Location: is the site of the club and not the site of the stadium

Club	Location	Stadium
Al-Arabi	Unaizah	Department of Education Stadium
Al-Adalh	Al-Holilah	Prince Abdullah bin Jalawi Stadium
Al-Safa	Safwa City	Al-Safa Club Stadium
Al-Oyoun	Al-Oyoun	Prince Abdullah bin Jalawi Stadium
Al-Diriyah	Diriyah	Prince Turki bin Abdulaziz Stadium
Al-Trgee	Qatif	Prince Nayef bin Abdul Aziz Sports City Stadium
Al-Faiha	Al Majma'ah	Prince Salman Bin Abdulaziz Sport City Stadium
Al-Qalah	Sakakah	Al-Orubah Club Stadium
Al-Kawkab	Al-Kharj	Al-Shoalah Club Stadium
Ohud	Medina	Prince Mohammed bin Abdul Aziz Stadium
Al-Tuhami	Jizan	King Faisal Sport City Stadium
Al-Suqoor	Tabuk	Khalid bin Abdulaziz Stadium
Al Mojzel	Tumaer	Al-Hamadah Club Stadium
Al-Ameade	Al-Atawelah	King Saud Sport City Stadium
Al-Hamadah	Al-Ghat	Al-Hamadah Club Stadium
Najd	Sudair	Prince Salman Bin Abdulaziz Sport City Stadium
Al-Rummah	Badaya	Al-Amal Club Stadium
Al Jabalain	Ha'il	Prince Abdul Aziz bin Musa'ed Stadium
Dhamk	Khamis Mushait	Prince Sultan bin Abdul Aziz Stadium
Wajj	Taif	King Fahd Stadium, Taif

== Final league table ==
Group A
Pos	Team	Pld	W	D	L	GF	GA	GD	Pts	Promotion or relegation
1	Al-Diriyah	18	12	4	2	31	14	+17	40	Promotion to the Saudi First Division
2	Ohud	18	8	6	4	27	22	+5	30	Qualified for Third Place
3	Al-Oyoun	18	8	5	5	33	22	+11	29	
4	Al-Tuhami	18	6	6	6	20	19	+1	24	
5	Al Jabalain	18	6	6	6	23	26	−3	24	
6	Al-Suqoor	18	6	6	6	19	24	−5	24	
7	Al-Hamadah	18	5	6	7	22	22	0	21	
8	Al-Qalah	18	6	3	9	27	33	−6	21	
9	Al-Adalh	18	4	7	7	22	27	−5	19	Relegate to Saudi Third Division
10	Najd	18	1	7	10	15	30	−15	10	Relegate to Saudi Third Division

Group B
Pos	Team	Pld	W	D	L	GF	GA	GD	Pts	Promotion or relegation
1	Al-Kawkab	18	12	3	3	33	19	+14	39	Promotion to the Saudi First Division
2	Al Mojzel	18	10	4	4	31	25	+6	34	Qualified for Third Place
3	Al-Safa	18	9	4	5	22	12	+10	31	
4	Al-Faiha	18	9	2	7	23	19	+4	29	
5	Al-Arabi	18	8	2	8	33	26	+7	26	
6	Al-Rummah	18	7	3	8	24	22	+2	24	
7	Dhamk	18	5	7	6	17	23	−6	22	
8	Al-Trgee	18	5	6	7	17	20	−3	21	
9	Al-Ameade	18	4	3	11	20	32	−12	15	Relegate to Saudi Third Division
10	Wajj	18	2	4	12	15	37	−22	10	Relegate to Saudi Third Division

=== Third place match ===
27 March 2013	Ohud	1–1	Al Mojzel	Prince Mohammed bin Abdul Aziz Stadium, Medina
	2' Adbulaziz Al-Siari		Yahya Duraid 47'	Referee: Amer Al-Shahry

4 April 2013	Al Mojzel	3–3	Ohud	Prince Salman Bin Abdulaziz Sport City Stadium, Al Majma'ah
	6'; 10'; 56'; (penalty missed) Daifallah Al Qarni		43'; 75'; 88'	Referee: Mohammed Al Howaish

=== Final ===
21 March 2013	Al-Kawkab	2–2	Al-Diriyah	Al-Shoalah Club Stadium, Al-Kharj
	Basam Al Hilal 23'; Saud Al-Ghareeb 75'		37' Meshaal ِِAl Anzi; 45' Mohammad Al-Qahtani

28 March 2013	Al-Diriyah	1–1	Al-Kawkab	Prince Turki bin Abdulaziz Stadium, Riyadh
	Naif Al-Khalifah 50'		5' Meshaal ِِAl Anzi	Referee: Mohammed Al Nhaet

Saudi Premier League
2012–13 winners
Al-Diriyah
1st title
