= Saleh Al-Omrani =

Saudi Arabian footballer

Personal information
- Full name: Saleh Al-Omrani
- Date of birth: March 16, 1994 (age 32)
- Place of birth: Saudi Arabia
- Position: Right back

Youth career
- 2009–2012: Al-Sawab
- 2012: → Al-Nojoom (loan)
- 2012–2014: Al-Qadsiah

Senior career*
Years	Team	Apps	(Gls)
2014–2016	Al-Qadsiah	3	(0)
2016	→ Al-Raed (loan)	0	(0)
2017–2018	Al-Tai	14	(0)
2018–2019	Al-Adalah	5	(0)
2019	Al-Orobah	8	(0)
2019	Al-Ain		
2020	Al-Entesar		
2020	Al-Sahel		
- * Club domestic league appearances and goals

Saleh Al-Omrani (born 16 March 1994) is a Saudi football player. He currently plays as a right-back.
