= M'Bareck =

M'Bareck is a Mauritanian surname. Notable people with the name include:

- Mohamed M'Bareck (born 1995), Mauritanian footballer
- Sghair Ould M'Bareck (born 1954), Mauritanian politician
