= 2008–09 Championnat National =

Championnat National
- Season: 2008–09
- Champions: Istres
- Promoted: Laval; Arles
- Relegated: Niort; Calais; Cherbourg; L'Entente
- Goals: 778
- Average goals/game: 2.04
- Top goalscorer: Eyemen Henaini (21)
- Biggest home win: Cannes 6–0 Cherbourg (22 May 2009)
- Biggest away win: Calais 1–4 Pacy Vallée-d'Eure (29 August 2008); Croix de Savoie 1–4 Laval (25 October 2008); L'Entente 1–4 Arles (15 November 2008)
- Highest scoring: Louhans-Cuiseaux 4–3 Beauvais (6 December 2008) (7 goals)

The 2008–09 Championnat National was the 16th edition of the 3rd division league. Play commenced on 1 August 2008 and ended on 29 May 2009. Vannes OC, Tours FC, and Nîmes Olympique were promoted to Ligue 2, replacing Chamois Niortais, FC Libourne-Saint-Seurin, and FC Gueugnon who were relegated from Ligue 2.

Villemomble Sports, Pau FC, FC Martigues and SO Romorantin were relegated to the CFA, and promoted from the CFA were Pacy Vallée-d'Eure from Group A, Croix de Savoie Gaillard from Group B, SO Cassis Carnoux from Group C, and Aviron Bayonnais FC from Group D.

== Participating teams ==
As usual, there will be 20 teams competing in the Championnat National in the 2008–09 season.

- AC Arles
- Aviron Bayonnais FC
- AS Beauvais Oise
- AS Cannes
- Calais RUFC
- SO Cassis Carnoux
- AS Cherbourg Football
- US Créteil-Lusitanos
- Croix de Savoie Gaillard
- FC Gueugnon
- FC Istres
- Stade Lavallois
- FC Libourne-Saint-Seurin
- CS Louhans-Cuiseaux
- Chamois Niortais
- Pacy Vallée-d'Eure
- Paris FC
- Rodez AF
- L'Entente SSG
- FC Sète

== DNCG Rulings ==
All clubs that secured Championnat National status for next season were subject to approval by the DNCG before becoming eligible to participate.

Following the DNCG's annual report on clubs, on 25 June, it was announced that six clubs had been relegated from the National to lower divisions. AS Beauvais, SO Cassis Carnoux, CS Louhans-Cuiseaux, and FC Libourne Saint-Seurin were relegated to the Championnat de France Amateurs. Besançon RC, US Luzenac, and FC Rouen, who were all recently promoted, were relegated to Championnat de France Amateurs 2, while FC Sète and Calais RUFC were relegated to the Division d'Honneur. All clubs relegated were allowed to appeal the decision.

Following an appeal from the aforementioned clubs, FC Rouen, AS Beauvais, and US Luzenac had their appeals overturned meaning they will remain in the Championnat National. Some clubs were, however, unsuccessful. FC Sète's appeal was upheld relegating them to the Division d'Honneur. Stade Plabennecois will replace them in the Championnat National. FC Libourne Saint-Seurin, Besançon RC, and Calais RUFC appeals were also rejected by the DNCG, however, all three clubs have decided to take their case to the CNOSF, the National Sporting Committee of France which governs sport in France. Both Calais and Besançon's rulings were determined on 23 July. The CNOSF determined that Besançon should be relegated to the CFA and not CFA 2, while Calais should respect and oblige the DNCG's ruling relegated them to CFA 2.

Libourne's ruling was determined on 27 July, when the CNOSF informed the club that they should honour the DNCG's ruling and suffer relegation to the CFA. Libourne's chairman Bernard Layda responded by announcing the club will file for bankruptcy, restructure the club, and oblige the ruling. Besançon and Libourne were replaced by ES Fréjus and AS Moulins.

Both CS Louhans-Cuiseaux and SO Cassis Carnoux had their appeals heard by the DNCG on 9 July. On 10 July, the DNGC ruled that both Louhans-Cuiseaux and Cassis-Carnoux rulings had been overturned meaning they will play in the Championnat National this season.

== League table ==
Pos	Team	Pld	W	D	L	GF	GA	GD	Pts	Promotion or Relegation
1	Istres (C, P)	38	21	12	5	55	24	+31	75	Promotion to Ligue 2
2	Laval (P)	38	19	14	5	52	31	+21	71	Promotion to Ligue 2
3	Arles (P)	38	19	9	10	52	37	+15	66	Originally denied promoted but later accepted promotion. (Note: On 23 June, the DNCG ruled that AC Arles-Avignon would not be allowed to play in Ligue 2 following their promotion from the Championnat National, due to irregularities in the club's financial accounts and management. On 3 July, following an appeal, the DNCG reversed its decision reinstating Arles' Ligue 2 status.)
4	Cannes	38	16	13	9	46	33	+13	61	
5	Croix de Savoie	38	16	9	13	51	43	+8	57	
6	Paris FC	38	16	7	15	46	43	+3	55	
7	Sète (Note: Sète have been deducted 3 points.) (D, R)	38	15	12	11	41	35	+6	54	Relegation to DSE (Note: All clubs that secured Championnat National status for next season were subject to approval by the DNCG before becoming eligible to participate. Following the DNCG's annual report on clubs, on 25 June, it was announced that six clubs had been relegated from the National to lower divisions. AS Beauvais, SO Cassis Carnoux, CS Louhans-Cuiseaux, and FC Libourne Saint-Seurin were relegated to the Championnat de France Amateurs. Besançon RC, US Luzenac, and FC Rouen, who were all recently promoted, were relegated to Championnat de France Amateurs 2, while FC Sète and Calais RUFC were relegated to the Division d'Honneur. All clubs relegated were allowed to appeal the decision. Following an appeal from the aforementioned clubs, FC Rouen, AS Beauvais, and US Luzenac had their appeals overturned meaning they will remain in the Championnat National. Some clubs were, however, unsuccessful. FC Sète's appeal was upheld relegating them to the Division d'Honneur. Stade Plabennecois will replace them in the Championnat National. FC Libourne Saint-Seurin, Besançon RC, and Calais RUFC appeals were also rejected by the DNCG, however, all three clubs have decided to take their case to the CNOSF, the National Sporting Committee of France which governs sport in France. Both Calais and Besançon's rulings were determined on 23 July. The CNOSF determined that Besançon should be relegated to the CFA and not CFA 2, while Calais should respect and oblige the DNCG's ruling relegated them to CFA 2. Libourne's ruling was determined on 27 July, when the CNOSF informed the club that they should honour the DNCG's ruling and suffer relegation to the CFA. Libourne's chairman Bernard Layda responded by announcing the club will file for bankruptcy, restructure the club, and oblige the ruling. Besançon and Libourne were replaced by ES Fréjus and AS Moulins. Both CS Louhans-Cuiseaux and SO Cassis Carnoux had their appeals heard by the DNCG on 9 July. On 10 July, the DNGC ruled that both Louhans-Cuiseaux and Cassis-Carnoux rulings had been overturned meaning they will play in the Championnat National this season.)
8	Pacy Vallée-d'Eure	38	13	13	12	41	42	−1	52	
9	Créteil	38	9	22	7	38	28	+10	49	
10	Beauvais	38	12	11	15	47	50	−3	47	Relegation to 2009-10 Championnat de France amateur
11	Gueugnon	38	11	14	13	38	36	+2	47	
12	Libourne-Saint-Seurin (D, R)	38	13	7	18	40	55	−15	46	Relegation to 2009-10 Championnat de France amateur
13	Bayonne	38	12	10	16	21	31	−10	46	
14	Cassis	38	11	13	14	37	47	−10	46	Relegation to 2009-10 Championnat de France amateur
15	Rodez	38	13	7	18	40	39	+1	46	
16	Louhans-Cuiseaux (Note: Louhans-Cuiseaux have been deducted 3 points.)	38	12	13	13	38	48	−10	46	Relegation to 2009-10 Championnat de France amateur
17	Niort (R)	38	9	14	15	31	37	−6	41	Relegation to 2009-10 Championnat de France amateur
18	Calais (D, R)	38	10	10	18	34	50	−16	40	Relegation to DSE
19	Entente SSG (R)	38	9	9	20	29	48	−19	36	Relegation to 2009-10 Championnat de France amateur
20	Cherbourg (R)	38	7	15	16	30	50	−20	36	Relegation to 2009-10 Championnat de France amateur

Rules for classification: 1) points; 2) goal difference; 3) number of goals scored.
(C) Champions; (D) Disqualified; (P) Promoted; (R) Relegated

== Stats ==
=== Top goalscorers ===
Position	Player	Club	Goals
1	Eyemen Henaini	AC Arles	21
2	Cyril Arbaud	FC Istres	13
3	Kévin Bérigaud	Croix de Savoie	11
-	Mathieu Duhamel	Stade Laval	11
-	Simon Feindouno	FC Istres	11
-	Lys Mouithys	FC Libourne	11
-	Foued Nadji	Cassis Carnoux	11
-	Yannick Yenga	Paris FC	11
9	5 players		10
14	7 players		9
21	2 players		8
23	6 players		7
29	5 players		6
34	18 players		5
52	25 players		4
77	33 players		3
110	43 players		2
153	100 players		1
Total:			778
Average after 380 games:			2.04

Last updated: 30 May 2009
Source: FootNational

== Managers ==
Club	Head coach
Arles	Michel Estevan
Beauvais Oise	Hubert Velud then replaced by Alexandre Clément
Cannes	Patrice Carteron
Calais	Sylvain Jore then Djezon Boutoille
Cherbourg	Noël Tosi
US Créteil	Olivier Frapolli
FC Istres	Nicolas Usai & Henri Stambouli
Stade Laval	Philippe Hinschberger
CS Louhans-Cuiseaux	Stéphane Crucet then Gaëtan Hardouin (caretaker), then Stéphane Crucet
SO Cassis	Léon Galli
Pacy Vallée-d'Eure	Laurent Hatton
Paris FC	Jean-Marc Pilorget
Libourne-Saint-Seurin	Stéphane Ziani then replaced by Thierry Oleksiak
Rodez AF	Franck Rizzetto
Bayonne FC	Alain Pochat
L'Entente SSG	Kamel Djabour
FC Sète	Fréd Remola
Gueugnon	René Le Lamer & Hubert Fournier
Niort	Denis Troch
Croix de Savoie	Pascal Dupraz
