= Alaeddine Abbes =

Tunisian footballer

Personal information
- Full name: Alaeddine Abbes
- Date of birth: 6 February 1990 (age 36)
- Place of birth: Mahdia, Tunisia
- Height: 1.75 m (5 ft 9 in)
- Position: Attacking midfielder

Senior career*
Years	Team	Apps	(Gls)
2011–2014	Étoile Sahel	5	(0)
2012	→ ES Zarzis (loan)	15	(4)
2012–2013	→ Olympique Béja (loan)	14	(3)
2014–2016	AS Marsa	51	(9)
2016	Stade Tunisien	3	(1)
2016–2017	Olympique Béja	2	(0)
2017–2018	Kairouan	11	(0)
2018	ES Zarzis	10	(2)
2018–2019	Étoile Métlaoui	10	(0)
2019–2020	Al-Nahda	?	(5)
2021	Al-Washm		
2022–2023	ES Zarzis	4	(1)
2023	ES Hammam Sousse	5	(0)
2023–2024	Al-Qous		
- * Club domestic league appearances and goals

Alaeddine Abbes (born 6 February 1990) is a Tunisian footballer who plays as an attacking midfielder for Saudi club Al-Qous. He played in the Tunisian Ligue Professionnelle 1 for Étoile Sahel, ES Zarzis, Olympique Béja, AS Marsa, Stade Tunisien, Kairouan and Étoile Métlaoui. He was a squad member for the 2007 FIFA U-17 World Cup.
