= 2010–11 Saudi Second Division =

Saudi Second Division
- Season: 2010–11

The Saudi Second Division is the Third-level football competition in Saudi Arabia. Qualified three teams to Saudi First Division.

== Stadia and locations ==
Locations of teams in the 2010-11 Saudi Second Division

| Club | Location (Note: site of the club and not the site of the stadium) | Stadium |
|---|---|---|
| Al-Arabi | Unaizah | Department of Education Stadium |
| Al-Batin | Hafar al-Batin | Department of Education Stadium |
| Al-Nahda | Dammam | Prince Fahad bin Salman Stadium |
| Al Oyoon | Al-Oyoun | Prince Abdullah bin Jalawi Stadium |
| Al-Diriyah | Diriyah | Prince Turki bin Abdulaziz Stadium |
| Al-Zayton | Bisha | Prince Sultan bin Abdul Aziz Stadium |
| Al-Fayha | Al Majma'ah | Prince Salman Bin Abdulaziz Sport City Stadium |
| Al-Taqadom | Muznib | Al-Taqdom Club Stadium |
| Kawkab | Al-Kharj | Al-Shoalah Club Stadium |
| Sdoos | Sdoos | Prince Faisal bin Fahd Stadium |
| Al-Nakhil | Bisha | Department of Education Stadium |
| Al Akhdoud | Najran | Al Akhdoud Club Stadium |
| Al-Hhait | Al-Hhait | Prince Abdul Aziz bin Musa'ed Stadium |
| Al-Qala | Al-Jawf | Al-Oruba Club Stadium |
| Al Hmadah | Al-Ghat | Al-Hamadah Club Stadium |
| Najd | Sudair | Prince Salman Bin Abdulaziz Sport City Stadium |
| Al-Badaya | Badaya | Al-Amal Club Stadium |
| Al Jabalain | Ha'il | Prince Abdul Aziz bin Musa'ed Stadium |
| Al-Suqoor | Tabuk | Khalid bin Abdulaziz Stadium |
| Al-Ared | Gway'iyyah | Prince Faisal bin Fahd Stadium |

== Final league table ==
Group A
| Pos | Team | Pld | W | D | L | GF | GA | GD | Pts | Promotion or relegation |
|---|---|---|---|---|---|---|---|---|---|---|
| 1 | Al-Nahda | 18 | 13 | 2 | 3 | 50 | 16 | +34 | 41 | Promotion to the Saudi First Division |
| 2 | Kawkab | 18 | 10 | 3 | 5 | 28 | 21 | +7 | 33 | Qualified for Third Place |
| 3 | Sdoos | 18 | 9 | 5 | 4 | 30 | 19 | +11 | 32 | |
| 4 | Al-Arabi | 18 | 6 | 8 | 4 | 23 | 17 | +6 | 26 | |
| 5 | Al-Fayha | 18 | 6 | 6 | 6 | 23 | 24 | −1 | 24 | |
| 6 | Al-Nakhil | 18 | 5 | 8 | 5 | 24 | 25 | −1 | 23 | |
| 7 | Al-Okhdood Club | 18 | 5 | 7 | 6 | 27 | 28 | −1 | 22 | |
| 8 | Al-Taqadom | 18 | 6 | 3 | 9 | 21 | 31 | −10 | 21 | |
| 9 | Al-Ared | 18 | 5 | 2 | 11 | 25 | 46 | −21 | 17 | Relegate to Saudi Third Division |
| 10 | Al-Hhait | 18 | 1 | 4 | 13 | 15 | 39 | −24 | 7 | Relegate to Saudi Third Division |

Group B
| Pos | Team | Pld | W | D | L | GF | GA | GD | Pts | Promotion or relegation |
|---|---|---|---|---|---|---|---|---|---|---|
| 1 | Al-Batin | 18 | 12 | 5 | 1 | 34 | 12 | +22 | 41 | Promotion to the Saudi First Division |
| 2 | Neom SC | 18 | 13 | 1 | 4 | 40 | 21 | +19 | 40 | Qualified for Third Place |
| 3 | Al Jabalain | 18 | 9 | 6 | 3 | 32 | 12 | +20 | 33 | |
| 4 | Al Oyoon | 18 | 8 | 6 | 4 | 26 | 23 | +3 | 30 | |
| 5 | Al Hmadah | 18 | 7 | 5 | 6 | 30 | 24 | +6 | 26 | |
| 6 | Al-Badaya | 18 | 6 | 4 | 8 | 31 | 25 | +6 | 22 | |
| 7 | Al-Diriyah | 18 | 5 | 7 | 6 | 26 | 27 | −1 | 22 | |
| 8 | Najd | 18 | 5 | 6 | 7 | 23 | 27 | −4 | 21 | |
| 9 | Al-Qala | 18 | 1 | 3 | 14 | 10 | 38 | −28 | 6 | Relegate to Saudi Third Division |
| 10 | Al-Zayton | 18 | 1 | 3 | 14 | 14 | 57 | −43 | 6 | Relegate to Saudi Third Division |

=== Third place match ===
| 8 April 2011 | Kawkab | 0–2 | Neom SC | Al-Shoalah Club Stadium, Al-Kharj |
| | | | 75' Ayed Al-Joni; 90' Abdullah Frahan |

| 14 Apr 2011 | Neom SC | 2–1 | Kawkab | King Khalid Sport City Stadium, Tabuk |
| | Abdullah Frahan 25'; Fares Al-Qadi 82' | | 48' Fouad Al-Harthy |

=== Final ===
| 6 April 2011 | Al-Batin | 1–0 | Al-Nahda | Department of Education Stadium, Al-Batin |
| | Yones Alulaiwi Al-Enezi 25' |

| 14 April 2011 | Al-Nahda | 4–0 | Al-Batin | Prince Fahad bin Salman Stadium, Dammam |
| | Faisal Majrashi 75'; Faisal Majrashi 90'; Jasem Al-Hamdan 75'; Hani Al-Dahi 90' |

Saudi Premier League
2010–11 winners

1st title
