= Sultan Al-Tamihi =

Saudi Arabian footballer

Personal information
- Full name: Sultan Awadha Al-Tamihi
- Date of birth: January 5, 1986 (age 40)
- Place of birth: Saudi Arabia
- Height: 1.83 m (6 ft 0 in)
- Position: Defender

Team information
- Current team: Huraymila
- Number: 14

Youth career
- Al-Rabea

Senior career*
Years	Team	Apps	(Gls)
–2012	Al-Rabea		
2012	Al-Nassr		
2012–2021	Al-Shoulla	137	(5)
2021–2022	Al-Sadd		
2022	Al-Thoqbah		
2022–2023	Al-Anwar		
2023–2024	Al-Sharq		
2024–2025	Al-Muzahimiyyah		
2025–	Huraymila		
- * Club domestic league appearances and goals

Sultan Al-Tamihi is a Saudi Arabian football player who currently plays as a defender for Huraymila.
