= Huraymila Club =

Association football club in Saudi Arabia

Huraymila
- Full name: Huraymila Club
- Founded: 1978; 48 years ago as Al-Shaeib; 2026; 0 years ago as Huraymila
- Ground: Irqah Sports Stadium, Riyadh
- Capacity: 500
- Chairman: Abdulelah Al-Brahim
- Manager: Andrija Andrejic
- League: Third Division
- 2024-25: Third Division, 9th of 10 Group A
Home colours	Away colours

Huraymila Club (Arabic: نادي حريملاء), previously known as Al-Shaeib FC, is a Saudi Arabian football club based in Huraymila, Riyadh and competes in the Saudi Second Division, the third tier of Saudi football. The club also consists of other departments including table tennis, volleyball and swimming. The club was founded in 1978 by Hamad Al-Qadeer.

Huraymila won their first promotion to the Saudi Second Division during the 2021–22 season after defeating Al-Qala 3–1 on aggregate in the promotion play-offs.

On 21 January 2026, the club changed its name to Huraymila Club.

== Current squad ==
As of 30 September 2022:

Note: Flags indicate national team as defined under FIFA eligibility rules; some limited exceptions apply. Players may hold more than one non-FIFA nationality.

No.	Pos.	Nation	Player
1	GK	KSA	Nawaf Al-Muwallad
2	DF	KSA	Abdulrahman Al-Shehri
3	FW	KSA	Riyadh Al-Ghamdi
4	DF	KSA	Abdulaziz Al-Solaih
5	DF	KSA	Hussam Talbi
7	MF	KSA	Abdulrahman Mohammed
8	FW	KSA	Ahmed Al-Harbi
9	FW	KSA	Fares Al Aqeel
10	MF	KSA	Faisal Al-Lehji
12	DF	KSA	Abdullah Al-Mehaini
14	DF	KSA	Sultan Al-Tamihi

No.	Pos.	Nation	Player
15	MF	KSA	Hamad Al-Shaye
16	MF	KSA	Nasser Al-Deaydea
18	FW	KSA	Faisal Majrashi
21	GK	KSA	Mohammed Al-Otaibi
23	DF	KSA	Khaled Al-Tamihi
24	DF	KSA	Dhari Al-Meqbas
25	MF	KSA	Fahad Al-Ghuraibi
26	MF	KSA	Khaled Hakami
27	FW	KSA	Sami Al-Dowaish
30	DF	KSA	Assem Al-Dheyab
34	MF	KSA	Abdulrahman Al-Shanar

== See also ==
- List of football clubs in Saudi Arabia
