= Sultan Al-Balawi =

Saudi Arabian footballer

Personal information
- Full name: Sultan Dakhilallah Al-Balawi
- Date of birth: December 26, 1979 (age 46)
- Place of birth: Saudi Arabia
- Height: 1.80 m (5 ft 11 in)
- Position: Goalkeeper

Senior career*
Years	Team	Apps	(Gls)
2002–2010	Al-Watani		
2010–2011	Al-Taawon		
2011–2013	Al-Suqoor		
2013–2017	Al-Watani		
2018–2020	Al-Suqoor		
- * Club domestic league appearances and goals

Sultan Al-Balawi (born 26 December 1979) is a Saudi football player.
