= 2017–18 Kuwait Crown Prince Cup =

Tournament details
- Country: Kuwait
- Teams: 15

Final positions
- Champions: Qadsia SC (9th title)
- Runners-up: Kuwait SC

Tournament statistics
- Matches played: 53
- Goals scored: 173 (3.26 per match)
- Top goal scorer: Bobby Clement (6 goals)

This was the 25th edition of the Kuwait Crown Prince Cup. The 15 teams were split into 2 groups, where top 2 from each group advanced to the final.

Kuwait SC were the defending champions.

== Group-Stage ==
=== Group A ===
Team	Pld	W	D	L	GF	GA	GD	Pts	
(Kuwait) Qadsia SC	7	5	2	0	25	6	19	17	Advanced to Semi-finals
(Kuwait) Al-Nasr SC	7	5	0	2	11	9	2	15	Advanced to Semi-finals
(Kuwait) Al-Salmiya SC	7	4	1	2	13	13	0	13	
(Kuwait) Al-Jahra SC	7	4	0	3	15	10	5	12	
(Kuwait) Kazma SC	7	3	2	2	12	7	5	11	
(Kuwait) Al Tadhamon SC	7	3	1	3	17	19	-2	10	
(Kuwait) Khaitan SC	7	0	1	6	6	20	-14	1	
(Kuwait) Al-Sahel SC	7	0	1	6	5	20	-15	1	

=== Group B ===
Team	Pld	W	D	L	GF	GA	GD	Pts	
Al Kuwait	6	6	0	0	21	3	18	18	Advanced to Semi-finals
(Kuwait) Al-Arabi SC	6	5	0	1	13	7	+6	15	Advanced to Semi-finals
(Kuwait) Al-Shabab SC	6	2	2	2	8	9	-1	8	
(Kuwait) Al-Yarmouk SC	6	2	1	3	7	10	-3	7	
(Kuwait) Burgan SC	6	1	2	3	5	11	-6	5	
(Kuwait) Al-Sulaibikhat SC	6	1	2	3	3	7	-4	5	
(Kuwait) Al-Fahaheel FC	6	0	1	5	8	18	-10	1	

=== Knockout stage ===
Semi-Finals
H	Qadsia SC	1(4)
A	Al-Arabi SC	1(2)
A	Al-Nasr SC	0
H	Kuwait SC	1

Final
H	Kuwait SC	1(5)
A	Qadsia SC	1(6)

==== Semi-finals ====
21-1-2018	Qadsia SC (Kuwait)	1-1 (a.e.t.) (4-2 p)	Al-Arabi SC (Kuwait)	Al-Sadaqua Walsalam Stadium

21-1-2018	Kuwait SC	1–0 (a.e.t.)	Al-Nasr SC (Kuwait)	Sabah Al Salem Stadium

==== Final ====
30-1-2018	Qadsia SC (Kuwait)	1-1 (a.e.t.) (6-5 p)	Kuwait SC (Kuwait)	Jaber Al-Ahmad International Stadium
				Referee: Yousif Nassar

== Awards ==
- Golden Boot: Bobby Clement
- Golden Glove: Sulaiman Abdulghafour
