= Moataz Tombakti =

Saudi Arabian footballer

Personal information
- Full name: Moataz Othman Osama Tombakti
- Date of birth: May 13, 1994 (age 32)
- Place of birth: Mecca, Saudi Arabia
- Height: 1.67 m (5 ft 6 in)
- Position: Defensive midfielder

Team information
- Current team: Al-Qous

Youth career
- Al-Wehda

Senior career*
| Years | Team | Apps | (Gls) |
| 2014–2016 | Al-Wehda | 11 | (0) |
| 2016–2017 | Al-Ittihad | 6 | (0) |
| 2017–2020 | Al-Fayha | 8 | (0) |
| 2018–2019 | → Ohod (loan) | 1 | (0) |
| 2020 | Al-Ain | 6 | (0) |
| 2020–2021 | Al-Shoulla | 3 | (0) |
| 2021–2022 | Najran | 0 | (0) |
| 2022 | Al-Shoulla | 0 | (0) |
| 2022–2023 | Al-Lewaa | | |
| 2023–2024 | Al-Sahel | | |
| 2024–2025 | Al-Sharq | | |
| 2025– | Al-Qous | | |

International career
| 2015–2017 | Saudi Arabia U23 | | |
- * Club domestic league appearances and goals as of 20 September 2020

Moataz Othman Osama Tombakti (Arabic: معتز تمبكتي; born 13 May 1994) is a Saudi Arabian footballer who plays for Al-Qous as a defensive midfielder.

== Career ==
On 16 June 2017, Tombakti joined Al-Fayha. On 18 July 2018, Tombakti joined Ohod on loan.

On 1 February 2020, Tombakti joined Al-Ain.

On 6 November 2020, Tombakti joined Al-Shoulla.

On 29 July 2022, Tombakti joined Al-Shoulla once again.

On 12 July 2024, Tombakti joined Al-Sharq.

On 24 August 2025, Tombakti joined Al-Qous.
