= Emad Al-Dossari (footballer, born 1990) =

Saudi Arabian footballer

Personal information
- Full name: Emad Al-Dossari
- Date of birth: January 8, 1990 (age 36)
- Place of birth: Saudi Arabia
- Height: 1.65 m (5 ft 5 in)
- Position: Winger

Youth career
- Al-Nahda

Senior career*
Years	Team	Apps	(Gls)
2010–2014	Al-Nahda		
2014–2015	Al-Ettifaq	20	(3)
2015–2016	Al-Fayha		
2016	Al-Nahda		
2017–2018	Al-Nahda		
2018–2021	Al-Taraji		
2022–2024	Al-Thoqbah		
- * Club domestic league appearances and goals

Emad Al-Dossari (Arabic:عماد الدوسري; born 8 January 1990) is a football (soccer) player who plays as a winger, most recently for Al-Nahda.
