= Mohammed Al-Towil =

Saudi Arabian footballer

Personal information
- Full name: Mohammed Al-Towil
- Date of birth: 10 February 1991 (age 35)
- Place of birth: Dammam, Saudi Arabia
- Height: 1.78 m (5 ft 10 in)
- Position: Goalkeeper

Team information
- Current team: Al-Noor
- Number: 22

Youth career
- Al-Ettifaq

Senior career*
Years	Team	Apps	(Gls)
2012–2014	Al-Ettifaq		
2014–2020	Al-Khaleej		
2020–2021	Al-Nojoom		
2021–2025	Al-Thoqbah		
2025–	Al-Noor		
- * Club domestic league appearances and goals

Mohammed Al-Towil (Arabic: محمد الطويل; born 10 February 1991) is a football plays for Al-Noor as a goalkeeper.
