= Fahad Abo Jaber =

Saudi football player

Personal information
- Full name: Fahad Abo Jaber
- Date of birth: March 21, 1986 (age 40)
- Place of birth: Saudi Arabia
- Height: 1.59 m (5 ft 2 1/2 in)
- Position: Attacking midfielder

Youth career
- 2002–2003: Al-Suqoor
- 2003–2005: Al-Ittihad

Senior career*
Years	Team	Apps	(Gls)
2005–2016	Al-Watani		
2016	Al-Suqoor		
2017	Ohod		
2017–2018	Al-Suqoor		
2018–2020	Al-Khaldi		
- * Club domestic league appearances and goals

Fahad Abo Jaber (born 21 March 1985) is a Saudi football player who plays as an attacking midfielder.
