= Saod Al-Kaebari =

Saudi Arabian footballer

Personal information
- Full name: Saod Abdul-Aziz Al-Kaebari
- Date of birth: 12 August 1980 (age 46)
- Place of birth: Saudi Arabia
- Position: Left back

Youth career
- Al-Suqoor

Senior career*
Years	Team	Apps	(Gls)
2000–2001	Al-Suqoor	-	(-)
2001–2003	Al-Ta'ee	-	(-)
2003–2008	Al Ahli		
2007–2008	→ Al Hazm (loan)		
2008–2009	Ettifaq FC		
2009–2012	Al Taawon		

International career
2003–2005	Saudi Arabia	4	(0)
- * Club domestic league appearances and goals

Saod Abdul-Aziz Al-Kaebari (Arabic:سعود الخيبري) is a Saudi football defender who played for Saudi Arabia in the 2004 Asian Cup. He also played for Al Ahli and Ettifaq FC.
