= Thierry Oleksiak =

French football manager (born 1961)

Personal information
- Date of birth: 11 September 1961 (age 65)
- Place of birth: Saint-Étienne, France
- Height: 1.80 m (5 ft 11 in)
- Positions: Defensive midfielder; centre-back

Team information
- Current team: Neom (assistant coach)

Youth career
- 1971–1979: Saint-Étienne

Senior career*
Years	Team	Apps	(Gls)
1977–1979	Saint-Étienne B		
1979–1986	Saint-Étienne	134	(6)
1986–1989	Nice	97	(2)
1989–1991	Metz	63	(0)
1991–1993	Lille	47	(1)
1993–1994	Angers	15	(0)
1994–1997	Aurillac		
Total		356+	(10+)

International career
1982–1984	France U21	12	(0)
1988	France Olympic	1	(0)

Managerial career
- 1994–1999: Aurillac
- 1999–2000: Amiens (assistant)
- 2001–2008: Aurillac
- 2008: Libourne Saint-Seurin (assistant)
- 2008–2011: Libourne (Note: In 2009, FC Libourne Saint-Seurin became FC Libourne.)
- 2013–2015: Saint-Étienne B
- 2015–2017: Saint-Étienne (assistant)
- 2017: Liaoning (assistant)
- 2018–2021: Lille (assistant)
- 2021–2022: Nice (assistant)
- 2022–2023: Paris Saint-Germain (assistant)
- 2023–2025: Al-Duhail (assistant)
- 2025: Al-Duhail (assistant)
- * Club domestic league appearances and goals

Thierry Oleksiak (born 11 September 1961) is a French professional football manager and former player who is the currently assistant coach of Saudi Pro League club Neom, under the direction of head coach Christophe Galtier. As a player, Oleksiak was a defensive midfielder and centre-back.

== Club career ==
Born in Saint-Étienne, Oleksiak began his career at his hometown club of Saint-Étienne. He played seven seasons for the club's first team from 1979 to 1986, winning the Division 1 title in the 1980–81 season. In 1986, he joined Nice, where he would play three seasons. In 1989, Oleksiak signed for Metz, before joining Lille in 1991. In 1993, he signed for Angers, where he met then-teammate Christophe Galtier; they would go on to work together extensively as coaches in the 21st century. In the 1993–94 season with Angers, Oleksiak suffered relegation from the Division 1. The season was also his final as a professional, as he joined amateur side Aurillac in 1994.

== International career ==
Oleksiak represented France at under-21 level in the early 1980s, and made a total of twelve appearances for the team. In 1988, he was selected by Jacky Braun, coach of the France Olympic football team, for a match against Sweden. France had already been eliminated in the race for qualification for the 1988 Summer Olympics, and lost the match to Sweden by a score of 2–1.

== Coaching career ==
In 1994, Oleksiak joined Aurillac as a player-manager. His team won promotion from the Championnat National 3 in the 1994–95 season. In 1997, he retired from playing, and became solely the manager of the team. From 1999 to 2000, Oleksiak worked as an assistant coach to his former Nice teammate René Marsiglia for Amiens, before returning to coach Aurillac in 2001. In 2008, Oleksiak joined Libourne Saint-Seurin (later renamed Libourne), where he was initially an assistant coach before becoming the head coach.

In 2012, Oleksiak returned to his hometown club Saint-Étienne, initially as a scout, before becoming the manager of the reserve team in 2013. In 2015, he joined his former Angers teammate Christophe Galtier's coaching staff in Sainté's first team as an assistant coach. Besides a small stint as an assistant coach for Chinese club Liaoning in 2017, Oleksiak followed Galtier to Lille, where he contributed to a Ligue 1 title in the 2020–21 season. In the 2021–22 season, Oleksiak was with Galtier at Nice. They both joined Paris Saint-Germain in July 2022, leaving after one season.

== Personal life ==
Thierry's father Jean is also a former professional footballer. They both played for Saint-Étienne and Lille in their careers. Jean's father, Thierry's grandfather, was a political refugee from Poland.

== Honours ==
=== Player ===
Saint-Étienne

- Division 1: 1980–81
- Coupe de France runner-up: 1980–81, 1981–82

=== Manager ===
Aurillac

- Championnat National 3: 1994–95

Saint-Étienne B

- Championnat de France Amateur 2: 2013–14
