= Al-Qous FC =

Association football club in Saudi Arabia

Al Qous
- Full name: Al Qous Club
- Founded: 1984; 42 years ago
- Ground: Al-Qous Club Stadium, Al Khurmah
- Chairman: Ayed bin Mansour bin Namai
- Manager: Ahmed Raslan
- League: Second Division
- 2024-25: Saudi Second Division, 11th (Group B)
Home colours	Away colours

Al Qous Club (Arabic: نادي القوس) is a Saudi professional football club based in Al Khurmah, Mecca and competes in the Saudi Second Division, the third tier of Saudi football. The club was founded in 1984 and consists of various other departments including table tennis, volleyball, and weightlifting.

Al Qous earned their first promotion to the Second Division, the third tier of Saudi football, after finish first their group during the 2021–22 Third Division. They finished as runners-up after losing 2–1 in the final to Al-Suqoor.

== Current squad ==
As of 6 August 2024

Note: Flags indicate national team as defined under FIFA eligibility rules; some limited exceptions apply. Players may hold more than one non-FIFA nationality.

No.	Pos.	Nation	Player
1	GK	KSA	Hassan Al-Harthi
2	MF	KSA	Mesleh Al-Dossari
3	MF	KSA	Muhannad Habkor
4	DF	TUN	Houssem Lahbibi
5	DF	KSA	Eisa Zaied
6	MF	KSA	Moataz Tombakti
7	MF	KSA	Mohammed Al-Hassan
8	DF	KSA	Khaled Daghriri
9	FW	KSA	Abdulrahman Al-Zahrani
10	MF	KSA	Saad Al-Thibiani
11	MF	KSA	Muaid Gharwi
13	DF	KSA	Mohammed Al-Subaie
14	MF	KSA	Faisal Darwish
15	MF	KSA	Mohammed Tombakti

No.	Pos.	Nation	Player
17	MF	GAM	Babou Cham
18	DF	KSA	Abdulrahman Basabba
19	FW	NIG	Abdulrasheed Idris
20	FW	MAR	Achraf Mirat
22	GK	KSA	Abdullah Al-Saeed
23	DF	KSA	Bander Al-Shammeri
24	FW	ALG	Walid Ait Mouhoub
25	DF	KSA	Saud Al-Muwallad
27	GK	KSA	Mohammed Mekbesh
29	DF	KSA	Hatem Fallatah
45	FW	SEN	Babacar Ndiaye
77	DF	KSA	Muteb Majrashi
—	DF	KSA	Khaled Al-Saqan

== See also ==
- List of football clubs in Saudi Arabia
