= Neom SC =

Association football club in Saudi Arabia

Neom S.C.
- Full name: Neom Sports Club
- Short name: NEOM
- Founded: 1965; 61 years ago as Al-Suqoor
- Ground: King Khalid Sports City Stadium, Tabuk Province (Planned: NEOM Stadium)
- Capacity: 12,000
- Owner: Neom Company
- Chairman: Meshari Al-Motairi
- Head coach: Christophe Galtier
- League: Saudi Pro League
- 2025–26: Saudi Pro League, 8th of 18
- Website: www.neom.com/neomsc
Home colours	Away colours

Neom Sports Club (stylized as NEOM S.C.; Arabic: نادي نيوم الرياضي) is a Saudi Arabian professional football and multi-sports club based in the Tabuk Province of Saudi Arabia. The club is named after the planned urban area of Neom and competes in the Saudi Pro League, the top tier of the Saudi football league system.

== History ==
=== Al-Suqoor Club: 1965–2023 ===
The club was founded in 1965 under the name of Al-Suqoor Club, which literally translates to “Falcons” in Arabic. It played mainly in the Saudi Third Division League and the Saudi Second Division League. In 2011 Al-Suqoor finished second and were promoted in Saudi First Division League, the second tier of professional football in Saudi Arabia, for first time in their history. The team finished last in their first season and were relegated. During the 2021–22 season, Al-Suqoor defeated Al-Qous 2–1 in the Third Division final to become the inaugural champions.

=== Neom takeover: 2023–present ===
On June 5, 2023, the Ministry of Sport said that football Club Al-Suqoor will be turned into a company and ownership to transform to NEOM. On 24 December 2023, the club changed its name to Neom Sports Club. On 22 April 2025, the club secured their first promotion to the Saudi Pro League following a 3–0 away victory over Al-Arabi.

Neom played their first-ever Saudi Pro League match on 28 August 2025, suffering a 1–0 defeat to Al-Ahli. The club recorded their first win in the following round, beating Damac 2–1 away from home with both goals scored by Alexandre Lacazette. Their first home victory came in a 1–0 win over Al-Okhdood, with the only goal of the match scored by Abdulmalik Al-Oyayari.

== Honours ==
- Saudi First Division League (tier 2)
  - Winners (1): 2024–25
- Saudi Second Division League (tier 3)
  - Winners (1): 2023–24
  - Third place (1): 2010–11
- Saudi Third Division League (tier 4)
  - Winners (1): 2021–22

== Kits ==
Al-Suqoor traditionally played in black and gold colours. Following the introduction of Neom, the team adopted white and blue kits.

Period	Kit manufacturer	Shirt partner
2022–2024	(Saudi Arabia) Skillano	None
2024–2025	(Germany) Puma	None
2025–	(Germany) Puma	Oxagon

== Players ==
As of 9 August 2026

Note: Flags indicate national team as defined under FIFA eligibility rules; some limited exceptions apply. Players may hold more than one non-FIFA nationality.

No.	Pos.	Nation	Player
1	GK	POL	Marcin Bułka
2	DF	KSA	Mohammed Al-Breik (3rd captain)
4	DF	KSA	Khalifah Al-Dawsari
5	DF	SEN	Malang Sarr (vice-captain)
6	MF	KSA	Abbas Al-Hassan
7	FW	GRE	Georgios Masouras
8	MF	KSA	Faisal Al-Ghamdi (on loan to Al-Ittihad)
9	FW	KSA	Abdulaziz Al-Othman
10	MF	ALG	Saïd Benrahma
14	MF	KSA	Khalil Al-Absi (on loan from Al-Riyadh)
15	MF	KSA	Abdulmalik Al-Oyayari
18	MF	KSA	Alaa Al-Hejji
19	DF	JOR	Mohannad Abu Taha
22	MF	KSA	Ahmed Al-Anzi

No.	Pos.	Nation	Player
23	MF	ARG	Valentín Vada
24	MF	KSA	Abdulaziz Noor
27	DF	KSA	Islam Hawsawi
33	GK	KSA	Abdulrahman Dagriri
44	DF	FRA	Nathan Zézé
55	DF	KSA	Mohammed Waleed
61	MF	KSA	Yahya Gharawi
70	FW	KSA	Haroune Camara (on loan from Al-Nassr)
72	MF	CIV	Amadou Koné
75	DF	KSA	Khalid Al-Rammah
77	MF	KSA	Muhannad Al-Saad
81	GK	POR	Luís Maximiano
88	GK	KSA	Mohammed Al-Hakim
91	FW	FRA	Alexandre Lacazette (captain)

=== Out on loan ===
Note: Flags indicate national team as defined under FIFA eligibility rules; some limited exceptions apply. Players may hold more than one non-FIFA nationality.

No.	Pos.	Nation	Player
11	FW	KSA	Hassan Al-Ali (at Al-Riyadh)
20	FW	KSA	Thamer Al-Khaibari (at Al-Khaleej)
26	MF	KSA	Riyadh Sharahili (at Al-Ettifaq)
38	DF	KSA	Mohammed Dakhilallah (at Al-Raed)

No.	Pos.	Nation	Player
40	MF	KSA	Ali Al-Asmari (at Al-Shabab)
—	FW	URU	Luciano Rodríguez (at Cruzeiro)
—	FW	KSA	Saad Al-Rashed (at Jeddah)

== Notable players ==
For all players with a Wikipedia article see Category:Neom SC players.

The footballers listed below in bold have international caps for their respective countries.

Saudi Arabia

- (Saudi Arabia) **Faris Abdi**
- (Saudi Arabia) **Mohammed Al-Amri**
- (Saudi Arabia) **Ali Al-Asmari**
- (Saudi Arabia) Sultan Al-Balawi
- (Saudi Arabia) **Mohammed Al-Breik**
- (Saudi Arabia) **Salman Al-Faraj**
- (Saudi Arabia) **Abdulrahman Al-Ghamdi**
- (Saudi Arabia) **Ahmed Al-Ghamdi**
- (Saudi Arabia) **Abbas Al-Hassan**
- (Saudi Arabia) Fahad Abo Jaber
- (Saudi Arabia) Aiedh Al-Joni
- (Saudi Arabia) **Saod Al-Kaebari**
- (Saudi Arabia) **Osama Al-Khalaf**
- (Saudi Arabia) **Maan Al-Khodari**
- (Saudi Arabia) Ahmed Al-Suhail
- (Saudi Arabia) Mohammed Harzan
- (Saudi Arabia) **Riyadh Sharahili**
- (Saudi Arabia) **Mustafa Malayekah**

Africa

- (Algeria) **Saïd Benrahma**
- (Algeria) **Mohamed Benyahia**
- (Egypt) **Ahmed Hegazi**
- (Ghana) **Samuel Owusu**
- (Guinea-Bissau) **Alfa Semedo**
- (Senegal) **Mbaye Diagne**
- (Mauritania) **Mohamed M'Bareck**

Asia

- (Syria) **Abdulkader Mjarmesh**

Europe

- (France) **Alexandre Lacazette**
- (France) **Nathan Zézé**
- (Poland) **Marcin Bułka**

== Personnel ==
=== Club officials ===
Position	Name	Nationality
Coaching staff
Head coach	Christophe Galtier	(France)
Assistant coach	Thierry Oleksiak; Nélson Caldeira; Mazen Albalawi	(France) (Portugal) (Saudi Arabia)
Goalkeepers coach	Fabrice Grange	(France)
Fitness coach	Labreg Slim; António Calado	(Tunisia) (Portugal)
Match analyst	Jonas Birk	(Germany)
Management
Chairman	Meshari Al-Motairi	(Saudi Arabia)
CEO	Moaath Alohali	(Saudi Arabia)

=== Managerial history ===
Dates	Name	Honours
15 July 2018 – 12 December 2018	(Saudi Arabia) Sami Al-Joufi	
12 December 2018 – 17 March 2019	(Tunisia) Bilal Bashouch	
18 March 2019 – 1 May 2019	(Tunisia) Zied Ghodhbani	
13 July 2019 – 22 November 2019	(Saudi Arabia) Mazen Al-Blwi	
1 December 2019 – 15 February 2020	(Tunisia) Nasser Nefzi	
15 February 2020 – 15 February 2021	(Tunisia) Zied Ghodhbani	
1 October 2021 – 1 April 2022	(Tunisia) Emad Jendoubi	2021–22 Saudi Third Division
2 August 2022 – 7 January 2023	(Algeria) Fouad Bouali	
7 January 2023 – 1 May 2023	(Saudi Arabia) Abdullah Al-Katheri	
29 June 2023 – 1 May 2024	(Tunisia) Afouène Gharbi	2023–24 Saudi Second Division
29 May 2024 – 3 July 2025	(Brazil) Péricles Chamusca	2024–25 Saudi First Division
5 July 2025 – present	(France) Christophe Galtier	

== Past seasons ==
Results of league and cup competitions by season
Season	League											King Cup	Other competitions		Top goalscorer	
Season	Division	Level	P	W	D	L	F	A	GD	Pts	Pos	King Cup	Other competitions		Top goalscorer	
as **Al-Suqoor Club**
2010–11	Second Division	3	18	13	1	4	40	21	+19	40	2nd ↑	DNQ	Crown Prince Cup	R1	(Saudi Arabia) Abdullah Frahan	12
2011–12	First Division	2	30	6	5	19	28	54	−26	23	16th ↓	DNQ	Crown Prince Cup	R2	(Saudi Arabia) Aiedh Al-Joni	5
2012–13	Second Division	3	18	6	6	6	19	24	−5	24	6th	DNQ	Crown Prince Cup	R2	(Saudi Arabia) Abdullah Al-Enezi	6
2013–14	Second Division	3	18	7	4	7	26	27	−1	25	4th	DNQ			(Saudi Arabia) Meshref Al-Amri (Saudi Arabia) Abdullah Al-Kathiri	5
2014–15	Second Division	3	18	3	5	10	15	31	−16	14	9th ↓	DNQ			(Saudi Arabia) Abdulrahman Al-Nouman	6
2015–16	Third Division	4	8	5	1	2	knockout cup competition				RU ↑	DNQ			(Saudi Arabia) Ahmed Al-Zahrani	5
2016–17	Second Division	3	18	5	4	9	25	33	−8	19	8th	Preliminary			(Saudi Arabia) Abdullah Al-Kathiri	7
2017–18	Second Division	3	18	5	5	8	21	26	−5	20	7th	Preliminary			(Saudi Arabia) Abdullah Al-Kathiri	11
2018–19	Second Division	3	22	4	9	9	22	37	−15	21	9th	Round of 64			(Saudi Arabia) Ali Al-Enezi	11
2019–20	Second Division	3	22	4	5	15	16	33	−17	15	15th ↓	Round of 64			(Saudi Arabia) Ahmed Al-Khaibari (Tunisia) Amara Ferjaoui	3
2020–21	Third Division	4	14	8	5	1	knockout cup competition				R32	DNQ			(Saudi Arabia) Fares Al-Harbi	11
2021–22	Third Division	4	16	11	3	2	29	18	+11	30	1st ↑	DNQ			(Saudi Arabia) Abdulrahman Al-Zahrani	9
2022–23	Second Division	3	30	5	12	13	34	46	−12	27	14th	DNQ			(Algeria) Mohamed Benyahia	7
as **Neom SC**
2023–24	Second Division	3	31	22	5	4	71	31	+40	68	1st ↑	DNQ			(Egypt) Mohammad Fouad	10
2024–25	First Division	2	34	24	7	3	80	27	+53	79	1st ↑	DNQ			(Brazil) Carlos	16
2025–26	Pro League	1	34	12	9	13	43	48	-5	45	8th	Round of 32				

Key

- GS = Group stage
- QF = Quarter-finals
- SF = Semi-finals

Champions	Runners-up	Promoted	Relegated

== See also ==
- List of football clubs in Saudi Arabia
