= Marouen Maggaiz =

Tunisian handball player (born 1983)

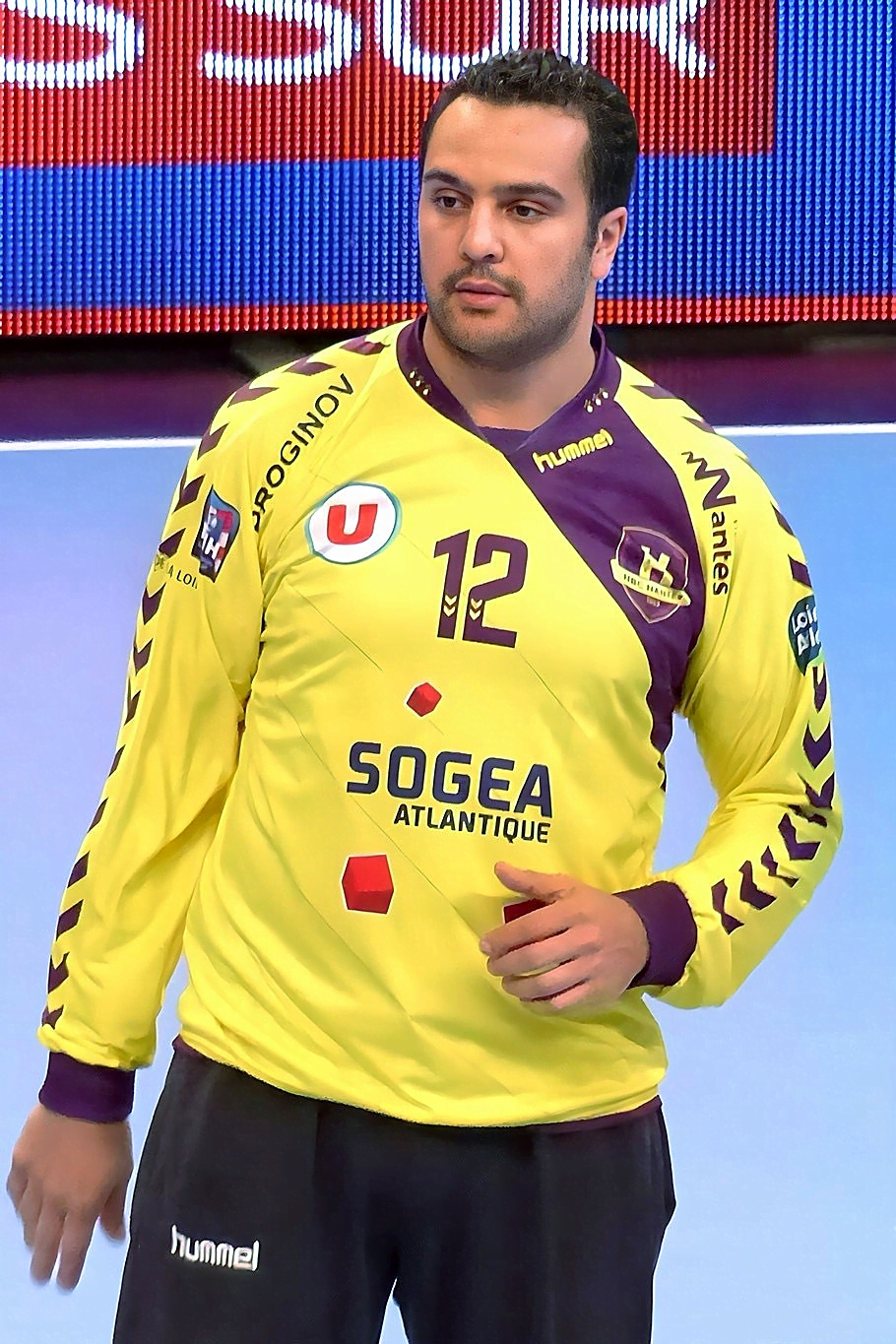

Personal information
- Nationality: Tunisian
- Born: 28 July 1983 (age 43) Béni Khiar, Tunisia
- Height: 1.92 m (6 ft 4 in)

Sport
- Sport: Handball
- Position: Goalkeeper
- Current club: Al-Noor Club
- Number: 12
National team
Years	Team	Apps	(Gls)
–	Tunisia	203	(4)
Medal record
African Championship
Gold medal – first place	2018 Gabon

Marouen Maggaiz (Arabic: مروان المقايز; born 28 July 1983) is a Tunisian handball goalkeeper for Saudi Arabian Al-Noor Club and the Tunisian national team.

He competed at the 2012 Summer Olympics in London, where the Tunisian team reached the quarterfinals.
