= Abdulaziz Al-Yousef =

Saudi Arabian footballer

Personal information
- Full name: Abdulaziz Al-Yousef bin Mohammed
- Date of birth: 6 October 1988 (age 38)
- Place of birth: Saudi Arabia
- Height: 1.74 m (5 ft 9 in)
- Position: Winger

Team information
- Current team: Sajer
- Number: 7

Senior career*
| Years | Team | Apps | (Gls) |
| 2008–2012 | Al-Shabab | | |
| 2011–2012 | → Al-Taawoun (loan) | 5 | (0) |
| 2012–2014 | Sdoos | | |
| 2014–2020 | Al-Mujazzal | | |
| 2020–2022 | Al-Riyadh | | |
| 2022–2023 | Al-Washm | | |
| 2023–2024 | Al-Sahel | | |
| 2024–2025 | Al-Sadd | | |
| 2025– | Sajer | | |
- * Club domestic league appearances and goals

Abdulaziz Al-Yousef bin Mohammed (born 6 October 1988) is a Saudi footballer who plays for Sajer as a winger.
