= Sajer FC =

Association football club in Saudi Arabia

Sajer
- Full name: Sajer FC
- Founded: 1976; 50 years ago, as Hawazin; 1981; 45 years ago, as Al-Yamamah; 2016; 10 years ago, as Sajer
- Ground: Al-Washm Club Stadium, Shaqra
- Chairman: Abdullah bin Salham Al-Otaibi
- Manager: Faisal Saif
- League: Second Division
- 2021–22: Third Division, 4th of 32 (promoted)
| Home colours | Away colours |

Sajer FC (Arabic: نادي ساجر) is a Saudi Arabian football club based in Sajer, Riyadh and competes in the Saudi Second Division, the third tier of Saudi football. The club also consists of various other departments including volleyball, weightlifting and cycling.

The club was founded in 1976 under the name of Hawazin Club by Eid bin Abdullah Al-Gablan. The club changed its name to Al-Yamamah Club in 1981. On 12 December 2016, the club once again changed its name, but this time under the name of the city it is based in, Sajer FC.

Sajer won their first promotion to the Saudi Second Division during the 2021–22 season after finishing first in their group. They lost in the semi-finals to Al-Qous.

== Current squad ==
As of 1 August 2021:

Note: Flags indicate national team as defined under FIFA eligibility rules; some limited exceptions apply. Players may hold more than one non-FIFA nationality.

| No. | Pos. | Nation | Player |
|---|---|---|---|
| 1 | GK | KSA | Muteb Al-Jabri |
| 6 | MF | KSA | Ahmed Faqihi |
| 7 | MF | KSA | Abdulaziz Al-Yousef |
| 8 | DF | KSA | Sultan Al-Muraished |
| 9 | FW | KSA | Maan Al-Zahrani |
| 10 | MF | KSA | Abdulrahman Al-Shanar |
| 11 | MF | KSA | Hussain Khabrani |
| 12 | DF | KSA | Mubarak Al-Shannat |
| 15 | FW | KSA | Fahad Al-Otaibi |
| 21 | MF | KSA | Abdulaziz Al-Shehri |

| No. | Pos. | Nation | Player |
|---|---|---|---|
| 22 | GK | KSA | Fahad Hashem |
| 24 | MF | KSA | Salem Al-Enezi |
| 34 | GK | KSA | Faisal Al-Shammari |
| 55 | MF | KSA | Ali Al-Dhowayan |
| 48 | DF | KSA | Riyadh Al-Kharaan |
| 61 | MF | KSA | Saleh Al-Saeed |
| 63 | DF | KSA | Abdullah Al-Dossari |
| 66 | MF | KSA | Bander Al-Mutairi |
| 90 | MF | KSA | Rayan Al-Warrad |

== See also ==
- List of football clubs in Saudi Arabia
