= Mohamed Almamy Camara =

Guinean footballer

Personal information
- Date of birth: 27 March 1996 (age 30)
- Place of birth: Conakry, Guinea
- Height: 1.87 m (6 ft 2 in)
- Position: Forward

Team information
- Current team: FC Rotkreuz

Youth career
- –2016: Strasbourg

Senior career*
Years	Team	Apps	(Gls)
2015–2016	Strasbourg B	18	(1)
2018–2021	Delémont	53	(47)
2021–2022	SV Horn	10	(1)
2022	Delémont	12	(9)
2022–2023	YF Juventus	9	(2)
2023–2024	Bassecourt		
2024	Tavannes		
2024–2025	Al-Nairyah		
2025–	FC Rotkreuz		
- * Club domestic league appearances and goals as of 1 October 2022

Mohamed Almamy Camara (born 27 March 1996) is a Guinean footballer who plays as a forward for FC Rotkreuz.

== Career statistics ==
=== Club ===
As of 23 December 2021.

Appearances and goals by club, season and competition
Club	Season	League			Cup		Other		Total	
Club	Season	Division	Apps	Goals	Apps	Goals	Apps	Goals	Apps	Goals
Strasbourg B	2015–16	CFA 2	18	1	0	0	0	0	18	1
Delémont	2018–19	Swiss 1. Liga	26	18	0	0	0	0	26	18
Delémont	2019–20	Swiss 1. Liga	14	17	0	0	0	0	14	17
Delémont	2020–21	Swiss 1. Liga	13	12	0	0	3 (Note: Appearances in the Swiss Cup qualifiers)	3	16	15
Delémont	Total		53	47	0	0	3	3	56	50
SV Horn	2021–22	Austrian 2. Liga	10	1	0	0	0	0	10	1
Career total			81	49	0	0	3	3	84	52
