= Jordan Galtier =

French footballer (born 1989)

Personal information
- Date of birth: 22 March 1989 (age 37)
- Place of birth: Villeneuve-d'Ascq, France
- Height: 1.69 m (5 ft 6 1/2 in)
- Position: Midfielder

Team information
- Current team: Lège-Cap-Ferret

Youth career
- 2004–2007: Auxerre

Senior career*
Years	Team	Apps	(Gls)
2007–2009	Bordeaux B	15	(0)
2009–2011	Fréjus Saint-Raphaël	40	(0)
2011–2013	Arles-Avignon	6	(0)
2013–2016	Lège-Cap-Ferret	59	(3)
- * Club domestic league appearances and goals as of 04:03, 27 May 2016 (UTC)

Jordan Galtier (born 22 March 1989 in Villeneuve-d'Ascq) is a former French professional footballer. He is currently assistant coach at the French Ligue 1 club Toulouse.

== Career ==
Galtier previously played professional for Bordeaux, Fréjus Saint-Raphaël, Arles-Avignon and Lège-Cap-Ferret.

In January 2008, he was called up for a training camp with the French under-21 futsal team for a four-day camp.

He made six appearances in Ligue 2 for Arles-Avignon between 2011 and 2013.

== Personal life ==
Galtier was born in France and is of Romani descent. He is the son of Christophe Galtier.
