= Bobby Clement =

Nigerian footballer (born 1998)

Personal information
- Full name: Bobby Ebuka Valentine Clement
- Date of birth: 14 February 1998 (age 28)
- Place of birth: Lagos, Nigeria
- Height: 1.94 m (6 ft 4 in)
- Position: Forward

Youth career
- Shooting Stars

Senior career*
Years	Team	Apps	(Gls)
2010–2014	Shooting Stars		
2014–2015	Heartland		
2015–2017	Enugu Rangers	17	(17)
2017–2019	Al-Arabi		
2019	Enugu Rangers	7	(0)
2019–2020	Al-Fahaheel		
2020–2022	Rivers United	3	(0)
2022–2023	Shabab Sahel	17	(4)
2023–2024	Elbasani	26	(3)
2024–2025	Jubbah		

International career^{‡}
2016–2017	Nigeria U20	3	(1)
- * Club domestic league appearances and goals as of 1 June 2024 ‡ National team caps and goals as of 22 January 2017

Bobby Clement is a Nigerian footballer who plays as a forward.

== Club career ==
Clement started his youth career at Shooting Stars. In 2014, he signed a four-year-contract with Heartland, where he played for one season before moving to Enugu Rangers.

On 8 September 2017, Clement join Kuwaiti club Al-Arabi. He returned to Enugu Rangers in November 2018. In August 2022, Clement moved back to the Middle East, signing for Lebanese Premier League side Shabab Sahel.

On 21 October 2024, Clement joined Saudi Third Division side Jubbah.

== Honours ==
Enugu Rangers

- Nigeria Premier League: 2016
- Nigerian FA Cup: 2018

Individual

- Kuwait Crown Prince Cup top goalscorer: 2017–18 (6 goals)
