= Mohamed M'Bareck =

Mauritanian footballer

Personal information
- Full name: Mohamed M'Bareck Gaucher
- Date of birth: 13 April 1995 (age 31)
- Place of birth: Mauritania
- Position: Winger

Youth career
- Concorde

Senior career*
Years	Team	Apps	(Gls)
2013–2018	Concorde		
2018–2019	Stade Tunisien		
2019–2020	Concorde		
2020–2021	Jeddah		
2021–2022	Al-Taqadom		
2023	Al-Suqoor		
2024–2025	Al-Selmiyah		

International career
2017–	Mauritania	7	(0)
- * Club domestic league appearances and goals

Mohamed M'Bareck Gaucher (born 13 May 1995) is a Mauritanian professional footballer plays as a winger for the Mauritania national team.
