= Al-Noor FC =

Association football club in Saudi Arabia

Al-Noor
- Full name: Al-Noor FC
- Founded: 1971 by Najim Hameed Alkhamis
- Ground: Prince Nayef bin Abdulaziz Stadium; Qatif, Saudi Arabia
- Chairman: Abdullah Al Darwish
- Manager: Khaled Al-Nuaimi
- League: Saudi Third Division

Al-Noor FC is a Saudi Arabian football (soccer) team in Sanabes, Qatif City playing at the Saudi Third Division.

== Stadium ==
Prince Nayef bin Abdulaziz Stadium
Qatif, Saudi Arabia

== Current squad ==
As of Saudi Second Division:

Note: Flags indicate national team as defined under FIFA eligibility rules; some limited exceptions apply. Players may hold more than one non-FIFA nationality.

No.	Pos.	Nation	Player
2	MF	KSA	Redha Al Mubarak
3	FW	KSA	Wael Faqihi
5	MF	KSA	Hussain Amin
6	DF	KSA	Sadeq Al-Ahmed
7	FW	KSA	Ali Al Eid
10	MF	KSA	Habib Al-Aradi
11	MF	KSA	Jassem Al-Dossari
14	FW	KSA	Hassan Al-Yousef
17	DF	KSA	Ali Al Darwish
18	DF	KSA	Feras Al Haziah

No.	Pos.	Nation	Player
22	GK	KSA	Mohammed Al-Towil
24	DF	KSA	Jehad Rommani
29	MF	KSA	Saleh Al-Zanan
27	MF	KSA	Khalifa Al-Saoud
44	DF	KSA	Fares Al Radhwan
50	GK	KSA	Osama Jahaf
66	DF	KSA	Ali Al-Sarkhi
88	DF	KSA	Mohammed Al Tawfiq
99	FW	KSA	Waleed Ghazwani
—	DF	KSA	Hashem Al-Shoula
—	MF	KSA	Mansour Mohammed

== Partners ==
Laser

== Handball ==
=== Current squad ===
Head coach: Asr Qasabe Subhe Ahmed

Squad for the 2027–28 season.

Goalkeepers

- 1 (Saudi Arabia) Hassan Basheer
- 12 (Tunisia) Marouen Maggaiz
- 37 (Saudi Arabia) Hussein Jehad

Left Wingers

- 9 (Saudi Arabia) Ibrahim Jawad Al Maki
- 97 (Saudi Arabia) Fadil Al Hamdan Abbas

Right Wingers

- 99 (Saudi Arabia) Hussain Furaij

Line Players

- 13 (Saudi Arabia) Shaheen Abushaheen
- 22 (Saudi Arabia) Khalid Waleed
- 77 (Egypt) Shady Ibrahim

Left Backs

- 14 (Saudi Arabia) Kamal Ahmed
- 57 (France) Hamza Kablouti
- 94 (Saudi Arabia) Ahmed Al Saeed

Central Backs

- 3 (Saudi Arabia) Al Obaidi Abdulmohsen
- 11 (Saudi Arabia) Mustafa Al Olaiwat
- 19 (Saudi Arabia) Murtaja Al Khedhrwai
- 24 (Croatia) Ante Gadza

Right Backs

- 15 (Egypt) Ahmed Adel Alagry (C)

== See also ==
- List of football clubs in Saudi Arabia
