= Christophe Galtier =

French football manager and former player (born 1966)

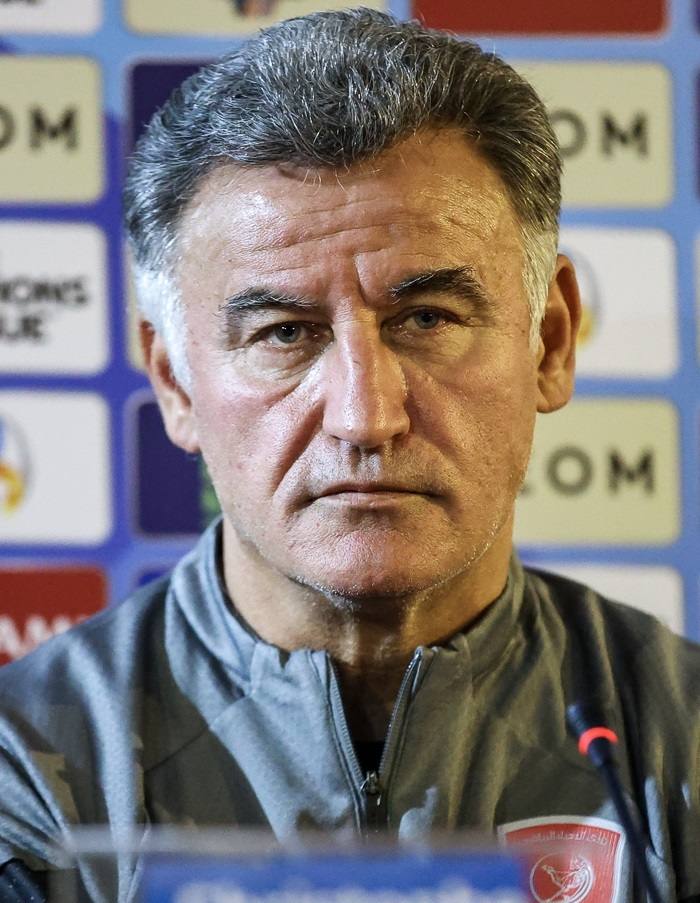
- Galtier with Al-Duhail in 2023

Personal information
- Full name: Christophe Galtier
- Date of birth: 23 August 1966 (age 60)
- Place of birth: Marseille, France
- Height: 1.76 m (5 ft 9 in)
- Position: Centre-back

Team information
- Current team: Neom (head coach)

Youth career
- SO Les Caillols
- 1982–1985: Marseille

Senior career*
Years	Team	Apps	(Gls)
1985–1987	Marseille	52	(0)
1987–1990	Lille	93	(0)
1990–1993	Toulouse	82	(0)
1993–1994	Angers	33	(1)
1994–1995	Nîmes	21	(0)
1995–1997	Marseille	62	(0)
1997–1998	Monza	24	(0)
1998–1999	Liaoning	23	(0)
Total		390	(1)

International career
1988	France U21	6	(0)

Managerial career
- 2009–2017: Saint-Étienne
- 2017–2021: Lille
- 2021–2022: Nice
- 2022–2023: Paris Saint-Germain
- 2023–2025: Al-Duhail
- 2025–: Neom
- * Club domestic league appearances and goals

Christophe Galtier (French pronunciation: [kʁistɔf ɡaltje]; born 23 August 1966) is a French professional football manager and former player who is the head coach of Saudi Pro League club Neom. A defender, Galtier spent many of his 15 years as a player at Marseille with spells at six other clubs, four in France and one each in Italy and China.

With Saint-Étienne, Galtier won the Manager of the Year award at the 2013 Trophées UNFP du football, which he shared with Carlo Ancelotti; he won again in 2019 after Lille finished in second place during the 2018–19 Ligue 1 season. Galtier won the trophy for a third time in 2021 after guiding Lille to their fourth Ligue 1 title in club history. After a one-year spell at Nice, Galtier joined Paris Saint-Germain in 2022, where he won the Ligue 1 title again.

== Early life and playing career ==
Christophe Galtier was born on 23 August 1966 in Marseille, Bouches-du-Rhône. He spent a large part of his playing career in France with his hometown club Marseille, whom he represented in two different spells. In a fifteen-year career, he also played for Lille, Toulouse, Angers, and Nîmes in France, before ending his career with stints in Italy for Monza and with Liaoning in China.

== Coaching career ==
=== Assistant coach (1999–2009) ===
From 1999 to 2004, Galtier was assistant coach at Marseille, Aris and Bastia. From 2004 to 2009, he worked as Alain Perrin's assistant coach at Al Ain, Portsmouth, Sochaux, Lyon and Saint-Étienne (ASSE).

=== Saint-Étienne ===
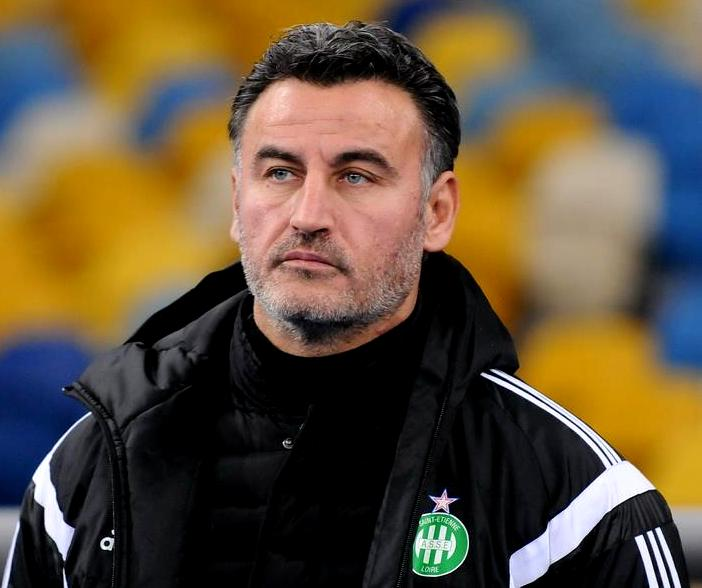
Galtier with Saint-Étienne in 2014

In December 2009, Galtier was appointed the head coach of Saint-Étienne, with ASSE in danger of relegation following the departure of Alain Perrin. In his first season, Galtier successfully guided ASSE to safety, finishing in 17th place. ASSE finished in the top 10 of Ligue 1 in the seven consecutive seasons of Galtier's tenure, with 4 of those seasons ending in a European place.

In 2013, ASSE defeated Rennes to win the Coupe de la Ligue, their first trophy in 32 years. His European debut as a head coach is a 3–0 home win over Moldovan club Milsami Orhei in the 2013–14 UEFA Europa League qualifying phase on 1 August 2013.

On 9 May 2017, Galtier announced he would be leaving Saint-Étienne at the end of the season upon the expiration of his contract. At that moment he was the longest serving Ligue 1 manager still active, having taken the reins for eight years. On 20 May 2017, he left the club after 361 games, including 147 wins, as Saint-Étienne head coach.

=== Lille ===
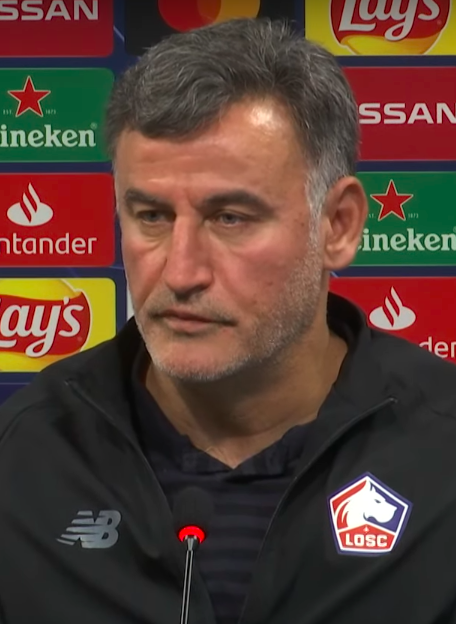
Galtier with Lille in 2019

On 22 December 2017, Galtier became the new manager of Lille, who were at the 18th place in the league. However, they eventually avoided relegation places by one point in the 2017–18 season. In the 2018–19 season, he led Lille to finish second and qualify for the next Champions League season, after a seven-year absence.

During the 2020–21 season, Galtier guided Lille to their first Ligue 1 title in 10 years and the fourth in club history. Galtier was praised by many pundits over the course of the season for both his tactics and his ability to develop young talent including Jonathan David, Renato Sanches, and Mike Maignan. For his efforts, Galtier was named the Ligue 1 Manager of the Year for a third time. On 25 May 2021, two days after winning the league title, he resigned as manager. He stated: "I simply have the deep belief that my time is up here".

=== Nice ===
On 28 June 2021, Galtier was appointed as the new head coach of fellow Ligue 1 club Nice. In his first season, he led the team to a fifth-place finish and a Coupe de France final, where they lost 1–0 to Nantes. Nice qualified for the UEFA Europa Conference League play-off round as a result. He left Nice on 27 June 2022, being replaced by Lucien Favre.

=== Paris Saint-Germain ===
On 5 July 2022, Galtier agreed a two-year deal to become the manager of Ligue 1 champions Paris Saint-Germain, replacing Mauricio Pochettino. In his first transfer window, he oversaw the arrivals of Hugo Ekitike, Nordi Mukiele, Fabián Ruiz, Renato Sanches, Carlos Soler, and Vitinha. During his spell at PSG, Galtier won the Ligue 1 and Trophée des Champions. He parted ways with the club on 5 July 2023 and was replaced by Luis Enrique.

=== Al-Duhail ===
On 12 October 2023, Galtier became head coach of Qatar Stars League club Al-Duhail. On 27 May 2025, Galtier left the club after they decided not to renew his contract after finishing second in the league, two points behind Al-Sadd, who beat them in the Qatar Cup final on penalties. They also exited the Emir Cup early.

=== Neom ===
On 5 July 2025, Galtier was appointed as a new manager for the newly-promoted Saudi Pro League club Neom.

== Personal life ==
Galtier is the father of former footballer Jordan Galtier. The family is of Romani descent.

== Controversies and arrest ==
In April 2023, Galtier was accused of making racist comments whilst Nice manager, which he denied. On 30 June 2023, together with his son John Valovic-Galtier, Galtier was taken into custody by the French police as part of the investigation into suspicions of racial and religious discrimination, at the time of his experience at Nice. It was announced that he would face trial in December. Among other things, Galtier allegedly said "Enough Muslims", "Algerians are the worst" and described black people as "King Kong". At the trial he denied the allegations. Galtier was acquitted of the charges by the court.

== Managerial statistics ==
As of match played 20 October 2026

Managerial record by team and tenure
Team	From	To	Record					Ref.
Team	From	To	P	W	D	L	Win %	Ref.
Saint-Étienne	15 December 2009	20 May 2017	361	147	109	105	40.7	
Lille	29 December 2017	25 May 2021	152	78	32	42	51.3	
Nice	28 June 2021	27 June 2022	44	24	8	12	54.5	
Paris Saint-Germain	5 July 2022	5 July 2023	50	34	6	10	68.0	
Al-Duhail	12 October 2023	27 May 2025	63	34	9	20	54.0	
Neom	5 July 2025	present	46	18	10	18	39.1	
Total			716	335	174	207	46.8	

== Honours ==
=== Player ===
Marseille

- Coupe de France runner-up: 1986–87

=== Manager ===
Saint-Étienne

- Coupe de la Ligue: 2012–13

Lille

- Ligue 1: 2020–21

Nice

- Coupe de France runner-up: 2021–22

Paris Saint-Germain

- Ligue 1: 2022–23
- Trophée des Champions: 2022

Al-Duhail

- Qatari Stars Cup: 2024–25

Individual

- Ligue 1 Manager of the Year: 2012–13 (joint), 2018–19, 2020–21
- French Manager of the Year: 2019, 2021
