= Al Khurmah, Mecca =

Governorate of Saudi Arabia

Al Khurmah
- Governorate
- Location in Saudi Arabia
- Coordinates: 21°55′N 42°02′E
- Country: Saudi Arabia
- Region: Makkah Region
- Time zone: UTC+3 (EAT)
  - Summer (DST): UTC+3 (EAT)

Al Khurmah is one of the governorates in najd Makkah Region, Saudi Arabia.
