= Al-Thoqbah Club =

Association football club in Saudi Arabia

Al-Thoqbah
- Full name: Al-Thoqbah Club
- Founded: 1973
- Ground: Khobar, Saudi Arabia
- Chairman: Khaled Al-Sayyah
- Manager: Zeyad Al-Ghodhbani
- League: Saudi Fourth Division
- 2023–24: Saudi Third Division, Group D 10th (Relegated)
Home colours	Away colours

Al-Toqbah Club is a Saudi Arabian football team based in Khobar that play in the Saudi First Division League, the second tier of Saudi football. As of 2026, the club plays in Saudi Fourth Division.

== Stadium ==
Prince Saud bin Jalawi Stadium.

== Current squad ==
Note: Flags indicate national team as defined under FIFA eligibility rules; some limited exceptions apply. Players may hold more than one non-FIFA nationality.

No.	Pos.	Nation	Player
2	DF	KSA	Hatem Faqihi
3	FW	KSA	Salem Al Jotar
5	DF	KSA	Abdulwahab Al-Khamis
6	MF	KSA	Saleh Sufyani
7	MF	KSA	Hossam Albu Hassan
8	MF	KSA	Faisal Al-Malbo
9	FW	KSA	Yousef Atallah
10	MF	KSA	Aiedh Al-Sohaimi
11	FW	KSA	Anas Al-Sebyani
14	MF	KSA	Emad Al-Dossari
15	FW	KSA	Mohammed Al-Shahrani
17	DF	KSA	Ahmed Al-Dhahri
19	MF	KSA	Ahmed Al-Khaldi
20	MF	KSA	Fares Al-Zahrani
22	MF	KSA	Modhaher Al-Jemaa
23	GK	KSA	Muaiad Akjah
24	DF	KSA	Raed Al-Ghamdi
25	DF	KSA	Fahad Hakami
27	MF	KSA	Khalifah Al-Saoud

No.	Pos.	Nation	Player
31	GK	KSA	Mohammed Al-Towil
53	DF	KSA	Abdullah Al-Yousef
54	MF	KSA	Abdulaziz Jaafari
55	FW	KSA	Shaher Al-Johani
56	MF	KSA	Hani Majrashi
57	DF	KSA	Hussain Al-Yami
58	FW	KSA	Zouhair Bouhwaih
80	DF	KSA	Zaid Al-Khaldi
88	MF	KSA	Abdullah Mahrazi
92	DF	KSA	Rakan Al Mosaed
99	DF	KSA	Abdulrahman Al-Jamaan
—	DF	KSA	Sultan Masrahi
—	DF	KSA	Salem Haqawi
—	DF	KSA	Ahmed Al-Aboud
—	MF	KSA	Hashem Makki
—	MF	KSA	Ashraf Al-Mokhalda
—	MF	KSA	Hani Al-Dhahi
—	FW	KSA	Yahya Dagriri
—	FW	KSA	Nasser Al-Shammari

== See also ==
- List of football clubs in Saudi Arabia
