= H̨awţah Sudayr =

H̨awţah Sudayr حوطة سدير
- Location within Saudi Arabia
- Coordinates: 25.5950984°N 45.6337856°E
- Country: Saudi Arabia
- Province: Riyadh Province

Population (2010)
  - Total: 28,954
- Time zone: UTC+3 (EAT)
  - Summer (DST): UTC+3 (EAT)

H̨awţah Sudayr or Hawtat Sudair (Arabic: حوطة سدير) is a city in Saudi Arabia. It is located 140 km north of the capital Riyadh.

The Majmaah University Astronomical Observatory is located in H̨awţah Sudayr, which partakes in observing the Ramadan crescent moon.

== See also ==
- List of cities and towns in Saudi Arabia
- Regions of Saudi Arabia
