= Al-Omran Club =

Saudi Arabian association football team

Al-Omran
- Full name: Al-Omran Club
- Founded: 1964; 62 years ago as Al Sawab; 2018; 8 years ago as Al Omran
- Ground: Al-Ahsa, Eastern Province, Saudi Arabia
- League: Saudi Third Division
Home colours	Away colours

Al-Omran Club is a Saudi Arabian football team in Al-Ahsa City currently playing in the Saudi Third Division.

The club was formerly known as Al-Sawab Club before its name was changed to Al-Omran Club.

== Current squad ==
Note: Flags indicate national team as defined under FIFA eligibility rules; some limited exceptions apply. Players may hold more than one non-FIFA nationality.

No.	Pos.	Nation	Player
3	DF	KSA	Othman Al-Muhaifidh
4	DF	KSA	Abdullah Al-Eisa
5	DF	KSA	Hassan Al-Shaqab
7	MF	KSA	Hussain Al Ohaymid
8	MF	KSA	Zakaria Al-Moqahwi
9	FW	KSA	Jehad Al-Lowaim
10	MF	KSA	Zouhair Bo Hwaih
11	DF	KSA	Abdullah Al-Hamdan
12	DF	KSA	Moteb Farzai
14	MF	KSA	Jamal Al Shanar
17	FW	KSA	Abdulrahman Al-Shehri
18	MF	KSA	Mahdi Al-Fadhl

No.	Pos.	Nation	Player
20	DF	KSA	Salem Al-Hassan
21	GK	KSA	Osama Al-Qassimi
26	MF	KSA	Mubarak Al-Dossari
41	MF	KSA	Hassan Al-Qattan
66	FW	KSA	Hassan Al-Qahtani
70	FW	KSA	Essam Al-Eisa
71	GK	KSA	Moqdad Bo Eid
78	MF	KSA	Ibrahim Al-Ibrahim
87	DF	KSA	Rayan Al-Moghasel
90	DF	KSA	Hussain Ben Ghaith
—	MF	KSA	Meshaal Al-Hamdan
—	DF	KSA	Haider Al-Jaziani

== See also ==
- List of football clubs in Saudi Arabia
