= Tayma stones =

Achaemenid-era Aramaic inscriptions

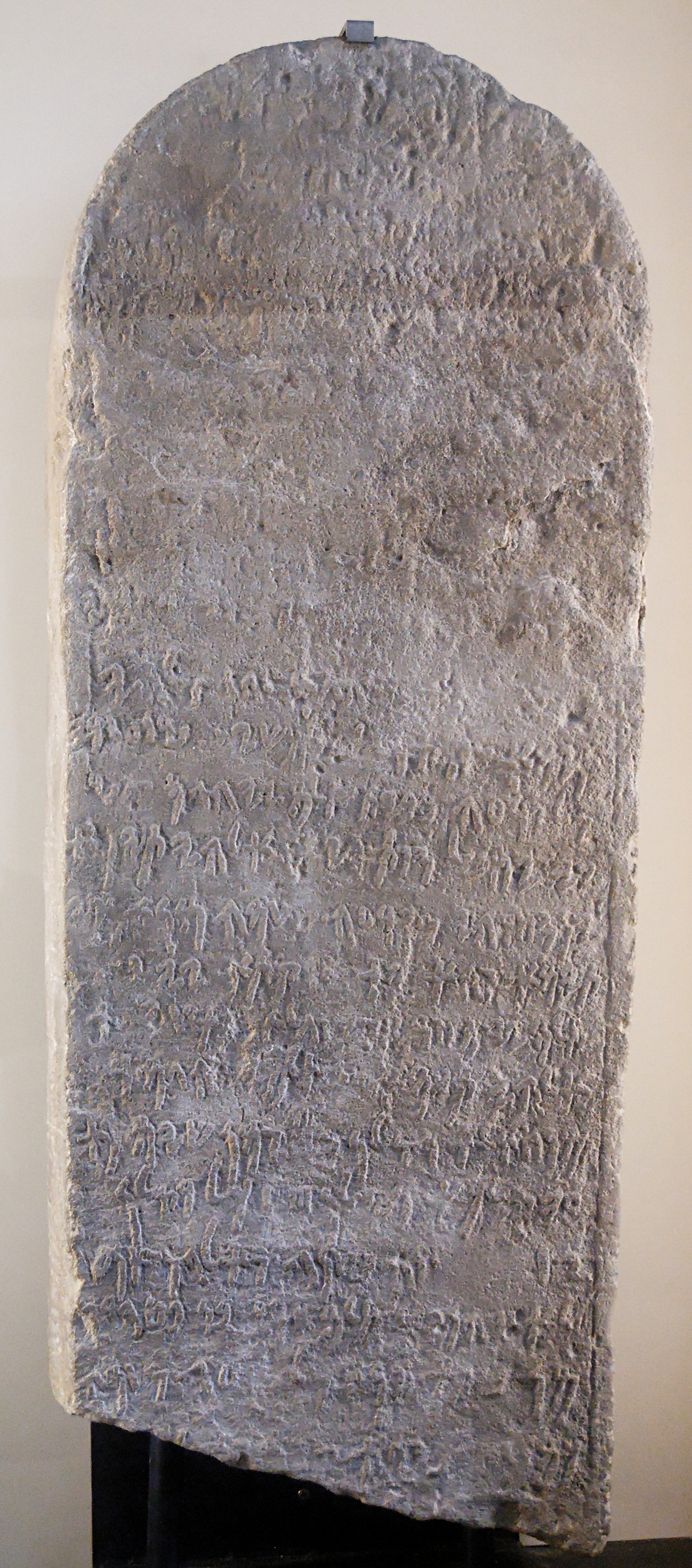
Tayma stone

The Tayma stones, also Teima or Tema stones, are a collection of more than 130 Achaemenid-era Aramaic inscriptions found in Tayma, in northwestern Saudi Arabia. The most famous one from the collection, and the largest, is called the Tayma Stele (KAI 228–230).

The first four inscriptions were found in 1878 and published in 1884, and included in the Corpus Inscriptionum Semiticarum II as numbers 113–116. In 1972, ten further inscriptions were published. In 1987 seven further inscriptions were published. Many of the inscriptions date to approximately the 5th and 6th centuries BCE.

== Discovery ==
The inscriptions were first discovered in modern times by Charles Montagu Doughty in 1876. He copied two of the texts, and his notes were later published in his 1888 Travels in Arabia Deserta. A handwritten note below the copies stated that: "Another stone with a like inscription is said to be among the fallen down in the ruin of the Hadaj".

French explorer Charles Huber saw the steles in situ in 1878, and took copies of them which he published in the Bulletin de la Société de Géographie de Paris. Huber made a second trip to retrieve the steles, but he died before he could publish them. The first publication was made by Theodor Nöldeke on July 10, 1884, with information provided by Julius Euting.

German traveler Julius Euting mentioned that he had found seen the stone on Sunday February 17, 1884 AD during his visit to Tayma, accompanied by Charles Huber.

== The Tayma Stone ==
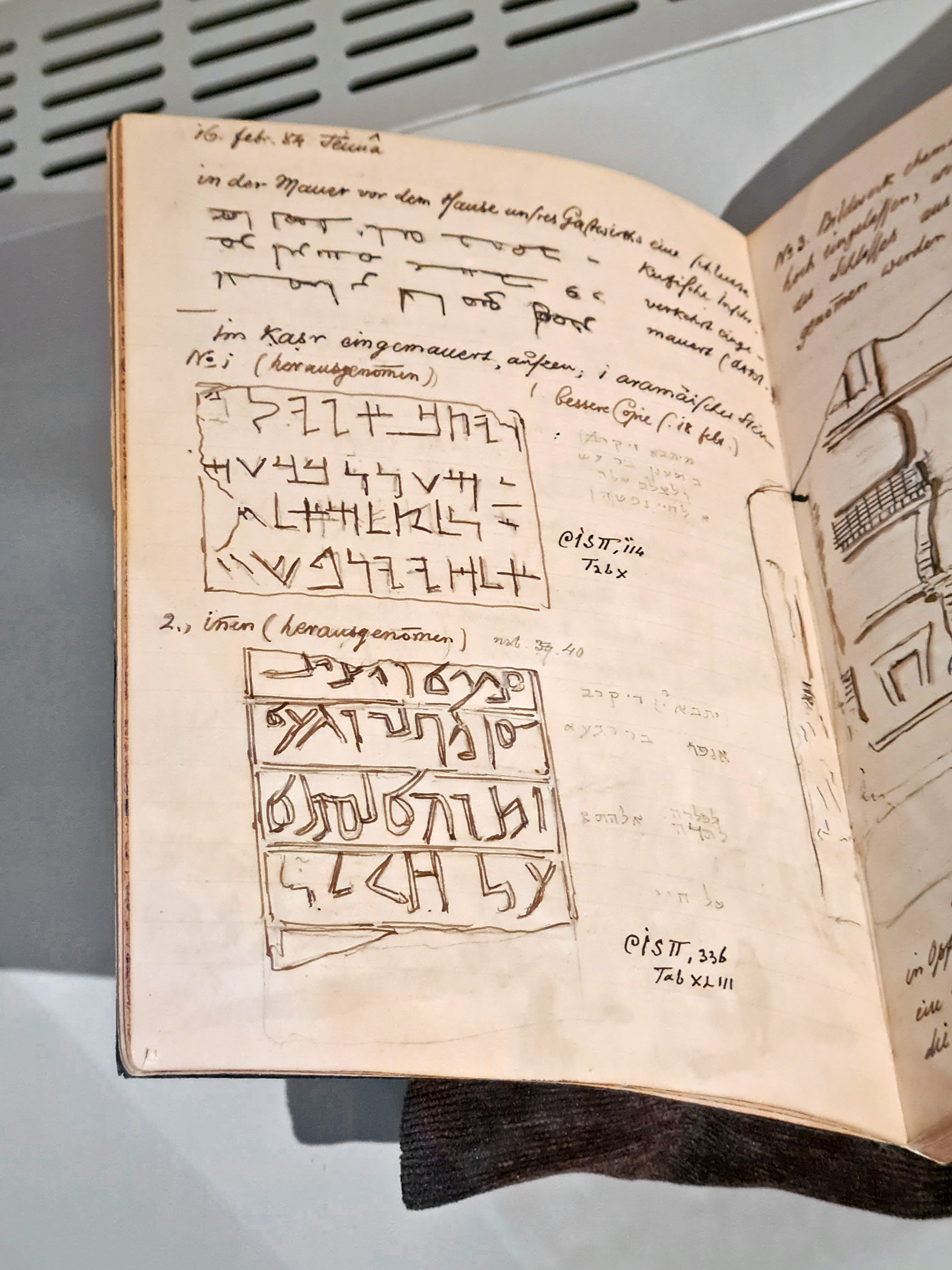
The notebook of Julius Euting with a sketch of two of the Tayma stones

=== Description ===
Carved of limestone weighing 150 kg, length 110 cm, width 43 cm, and thickness 12 cm, and it has an inscription in the Aramaic language of twenty-three lines.

It was originally to be sent to Germany, but ultimately was sent to France, where it is now displayed in the Louvre Museum.

The head of the person standing in the upper part of the obelisk resembles the helmets that used to appear on the heads of the warriors of Assyrians and Babylonians.

The well known text is included in many corpora of Canaanite and Aramaic inscriptions: CIS II 113, NSI 69, KAI 228 and TSSI 30.

=== Text ===
The inscription tells how the priest Salm-shezeb, son of Pet-Osiri, introduced a new god, Salm of Hagam, into Tema; how his temple was endowed, and how Salm-shezeb founded a hereditary priesthood there. On the side, figures of Salm and Salm-shezeb

Side A
1 … in the year 22 …
2
3 […'Aš]erah, the gods of Tayma', at Ṣalm of
4 …]his name, on this day [at Tay]ma'
5-8 […]
9 that [raised]ve Ṣalmšezib son of Peṭosiris
10 in the temple of Ṣal[m of Hagam. For the gods
11 Tayma' consecrated Ṣalmšezib son of Peṭosiris
12 and his descendant in the temple of Ṣalm of Hagam. And the man
13 who will destroy this monument, may the gods of Tayma'
14 eliminate him and his descendants and his name from the face of
15 Tayma' and here is the endowment that
16 Ṣalm of Maḥarm and Šangal and Ašerah have made
17 the gods of Tayma' for Ṣalm of Hagam namely
18 from the field 16 palms and from the treasury
19 of the king 5 palms, total palms
20 21, year after year, and may the gods and men
21 not expel Ṣalmšezib son of Peṭosriris
22 of this temple neither his descent nor his name,
23 (who are) the priests of this temple [forever].
Side B
1 Ṣalmšezib
2 the priest

(Translation revised by JM Roche after F. Briquel Chatonnet 1997)

== Historical significance ==
The steles have historical significance, as they represent an important part of the history of Tayma and of the history of the Arabian Peninsula. The Saudi Antiquities Authority have stated their desire to repatriate the stones, as they are at the forefront of the national archaeological treasures found abroad.

== Concordance ==
Name	Image	Al-Theeb	CIS ii	NSI	KAI	Degen	Atlal 7
Tayma Stone			113	69	228		
Salm pedestal (AO 27196)			114	70	229		
Building-inscription fragment (AO 27226)			115		230		
Two inscriptions known from drawings			116				
Inscription (AO 26599)			336				
Inscription						2: 84–85	
Funeral stele						2: 87–88	
Effaced funeral stele						2: 88	
Funeral stele						2: 90	
Two ostraca						2: 91	
1979 royal stele		11					108–111
Stone basin		1					105–106
Stele		2					106
Stele		3					107
Stele							107
Stele							107
Engraver’s practice block		4A–4B					108
Inscription (Atlal 9, p.168)							
Memorial stone of Gn son of ʿBdgn		5					
Grave of ʿlymnnt daughter of Tymn		6					
Block inscription		7					
Incense altar of Mry		8					
Incense altar of Ngʿlh		9					
Memorial of Mrn son of […]		10					

== Gallery ==
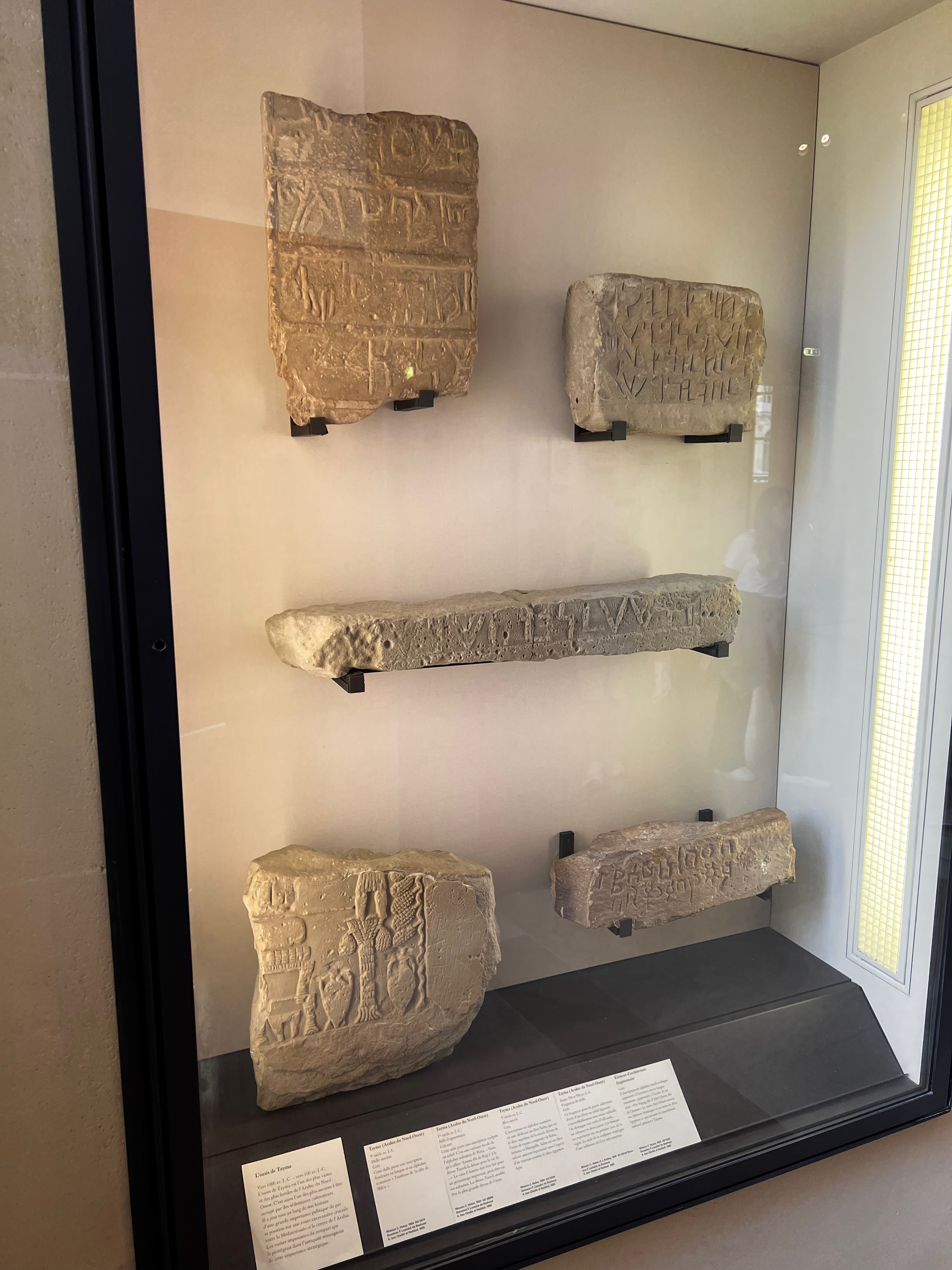
Display of Tayma inscriptions at the Louvre

Copy of the Tayma Stone at the National Museum of Saudi Arabia

== See also ==
- Tayma

== Bibliography ==
- Nöldeke, Theodor, "Altaramäische Inschriften aus Teimâ (Arabien)." SPAW Jun-Dec (1884): 813–20.
- Charles Montagu Doughty, 1884, Documents épigraphiques recueillis dans le Nord de l'Arabie
- Renan, E., "Les inscriptions araméennes de Teimâ." RA 1 (1884–85): 41–45
- Euting, J., Nabatäische Inschriften aus Arabien, Berlin: G. Reimer, 1885
- Neubauer, A., "On Some Newly-Discovered Temanite and Nabataean Inscriptions." Studia biblica 1 (1885): 209–32.
- Neubauer, A., "The God ṣlm ." The Athenaeum 2992 (28 Feb.) (1885a): 280.
- Halévy, J., "Encore un mot sur l'inscription de Teima." REJ 12 (1886): 111–13.
- Charles Montagu Doughty, Travels in Arabia Deserta. Cambridge. Cambridge: Cambridge Univ. Press, 1888.
- Duval, R., "La Dîme à Teima." RA 2 (1888): 1–3.
- Winckler, H., "Zur Inschrift von Teima." Pp. 76–77 In Altorientalische Forschungen., Leipzig: E. Pfeiffer, 1898.
- Littman, E. (1904), "The stele of Teima in Arabia: a welcome of the gods", The Monist,. XIV, 510–515
- Dougherty, Raymond P. “A Babylonian City in Arabia.” American Journal of Archaeology, vol. 34, no. 3, 1930, pp. 296–312
- Degen, Rainer [in German] (1972). "Die aramäischen Inschriften aus Taima und Umgebung". Neue Ephemeris für semitische Epigraphik,: von R. Degen, Walter W. Muller [und] Wolfgang Rolig. O. Harrassowitz. pp. 79–98.
- Livingstone, A. et al., "Taimā:Recent Soundings and New Inscribed Material (1402/1982)." Atlal 7 (1983): 102–16, pls. 87–97.
- Cross, F.M., "A New Aramaic Stele from Taymā." CBQ 48 (1986): 387–94
- Beyer, K. and Livingstone, A., "Die neuesten aramäischen Inschriften aus Taima." ZDMG 137 (1987): 285–96.
- Beyer, K. and Livingstone, A., "Eine neue reichsaramäische Inschrift aus Taima." ZDMG 140 (1990): 1–2.
- al-Theeb, Sulaiman (1993), Aramaic and Nabatean Inscriptions from North-West Saudi Arabia, Riyadh: King Fahd National Library
- McCarter, P.K. Jr., "What Are Two Aramaic Stelae Doing in Saudi Arabia?." BAR 21/2 (1995): 72–73.
