= Charles Doughty-Wylie =

Recipient of the Victoria Cross

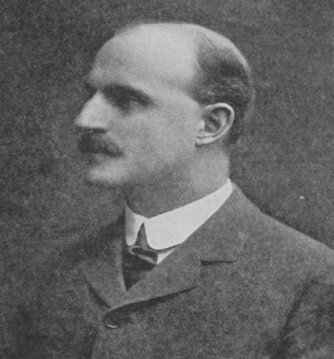
- Born: 23 July 1868; Theberton, Suffolk, England
- Died: 26 April 1915 (aged 46); V Beach, Cape Helles, Gallipoli, Ottoman Empire
- Military career
- Allegiance: United Kingdom
- Branch: British Army
- Service years: 1889–1915
- Rank: Lieutenant colonel
- Units: Somaliland Camel Corps; The Royal Welch Fusiliers
- Conflicts: Mahdist War; Chitral Expedition; 1898 Occupation of Crete; Second Boer War; Boxer Rebellion; Third Somaliland Expedition; First World War: Gallipoli campaign; Landing at Cape Helles; Landing at V Beach †
- Awards: Victoria Cross; Companion of the Order of the Bath; Companion of the Order of St Michael and St George; Mentioned in Despatches; Order of the Medjidie (Ottoman Empire)

Lieutenant Colonel Charles Hotham Montagu "Richard" Doughty-Wylie, VC, CB, CMG (23 July 1868 – 26 April 1915) was a British Army officer and an English recipient of the Victoria Cross, the highest award for gallantry in the face of the enemy that can be awarded to members of the British and Commonwealth armed forces. Doughty-Wylie had been awarded the Order of the Medjidie from the very Ottoman Government he later fought against. He was generally known as Richard.

== Early life ==
Charles Hotham Montagu Doughty was the eldest son of Henry Montagu Doughty of Theberton Hall, Suffolk, and Edith Rebecca Doughty, née Cameron. A younger brother was Henry Montagu Doughty. His father's brother was Charles Montagu Doughty, author of Travels in Arabia Deserta.

Doughty was educated at Winchester College. He graduated from the Royal Military College, Sandhurst in 1889, and was commissioned a second lieutenant in the Royal Welch Fusiliers on 21 September 1889, where he was subsequently promoted to lieutenant on 23 September 1891, and captain on 9 September 1896. His military career included the Chitral Expedition of 1895 and the 1898 Occupation of Crete, between and after which he was posted in Sudan serving with Lord Kitchener in the Mahdist War (1898–99). In 1899 he took part in the final defeat of the Khalifa, as brigade major to the Infantry Brigade with the flying column, and was mentioned in despatches. He next served in the Second Boer War in South Africa, and was posted to China during the Boxer Rebellion (1900). He was selected for special service in Somaliland in February 1903, and commanded a unit of the Somaliland Camel Corps until 1904.

He married in 1904 a nurse Lilian Oimara Adams Wylie, daughter of John Wylie and widow of Lieutenant Henry Adams. He adopted the surname Doughty-Wylie to incorporate his wife's maiden name.

== Turkish Revolution ==
Colonel Doughty-Wylie was the Acting British Vice-Consul at Konieh and Mersina, Ottoman Empire, during the Young Turk Revolution of 1909. Richard Bell-Davies (later a VC recipient, then a lieutenant on the battleship HMS Swiftsure) met him at the time and gives an account in his autobiography Sailor in the Air (1967).

Massacres of Armenians in Mersina started along with the revolution, and Bell-Davies says that it was largely due to the efforts of Doughty-Wylie that these were halted. Doughty-Wylie then went to Adana, forty miles away, where he persuaded the local Vali (Governor) to give him a small escort of Ottoman troops and a bugler; with these he managed to restore order. Mrs. Doughty-Wylie turned part of the dragoman's house into a hospital for wounded Armenians. Bell-Davies says that by the time an armed party from Swiftsure arrived, Doughty-Wylie had again almost stopped the massacre single-handedly. Newspaper reports of the period record that Doughty-Wylie was shot in the arm while trying to prevent the Adana massacres. He was appointed a Companion of the Order of St Michael and St George (CMG) in the 1909 Birthday Honours in recognition of his services during the disturbances in Asia Minor.

In 1913, Doughty-Wylie was the recipient of the Order of the Medjidie (Second Class) from the Ottoman Government. He was awarded the Medjidie "in recognition of valuable services rendered by him while in charge of the British Red Cross Hospitals in Turkey" during the Balkan Wars.

== First World War ==
Doughty-Wylie was 46 years old, and a lieutenant colonel in The Royal Welch Fusiliers, British Army when, "owing to his great knowledge of things Turkish" according to Bell-Davies, he was attached to General Sir Ian Hamilton's headquarters staff of the Mediterranean Expeditionary Force during the Gallipoli Campaign.

On 26 April 1915, following the landing at Cape Helles on the Gallipoli peninsula of the SS River Clyde, Lieutenant Colonel Doughty-Wylie and Captain Garth Neville Walford organised and made an attack through and on both sides of the village of Sedd-el-Bahr on the Old Fort at the top of the hill. The enemy's position was very strongly entrenched and defended, but mainly due to the initiative, skill and great gallantry of the two officers the attack was a complete success. However, both Doughty-Wylie and Walford were killed in the moment of victory; Doughty-Wylie was shot in the face by a sniper, and died instantly.

Doughty-Wylie is buried close to where he was killed, immediately north of Sedd-el-Bahr, opposite the point at which the SS River Clyde came ashore. His grave is the only solitary British or Commonwealth war grave on the Gallipoli peninsula: The Turkish authorities moved the graves of all other foreign soldiers to the "V Beach" graves except for his.

His Victoria Cross, posthumously awarded for bravery during a beach landing at Gallipoli in April 1915, is displayed at the Royal Welch Fusiliers Museum in Caernarfon Castle, Gwynedd, Wales. Damaged plating from the River Clyde can be seen in the Royal Hampshire Regiment Museum in Winchester, England.

== Personal life ==
Doughty-Wylie, a married man, had an unconsummated affair with Gertrude Bell with whom he exchanged love letters from 1913 until his death. Bell was an eminent English writer, traveller, political officer, administrator, and archaeologist who explored in the region of Syria, Mesopotamia, Asia Minor, and Arabia. Doughty-Wylie was a member of the Naval and Military Club from 1900 until his death.

His wife, Lilian, reportedly was the only woman on the Allied side to visit Gallipoli during the campaign, when she went to lay a wreath on his grave on 17 November 1915. She was awarded the Royal Red Cross (First Class) in the 1919 New Year Honours for her work as matron at Limenaria Hospital, Thasos, Greece. She died in Cyprus in 1961 at the age of 83.

== Legacy ==
Doughty-Wylie is commemorated outside St Peter's Church in Theberton, Suffolk where his name is recorded on the war memorial. Inside the church he is depicted as St George in a stained glass window by T. F. Curtis of Ward and Hughes. A road in the village is named Doughty-Wylie Crescent. He is named on the Winchester College War Cloister, the war memorial at Winchester College.

Damian Lewis played him in Queen of the Desert (2015), a biographical drama film based on the life of Gertrude Bell. He was voiced by Pip Torrens in Letters from Baghdad, a 2016 documentary on Bell.

== Bibliography ==
- Snelling, Stephen (2012) [1995]. Gallipoli. VCs of the First World War. The History Press. ISBN 978-0752456539.
