= St Peter's Church, Theberton =

Church in Suffolk, England

Church of St Peter
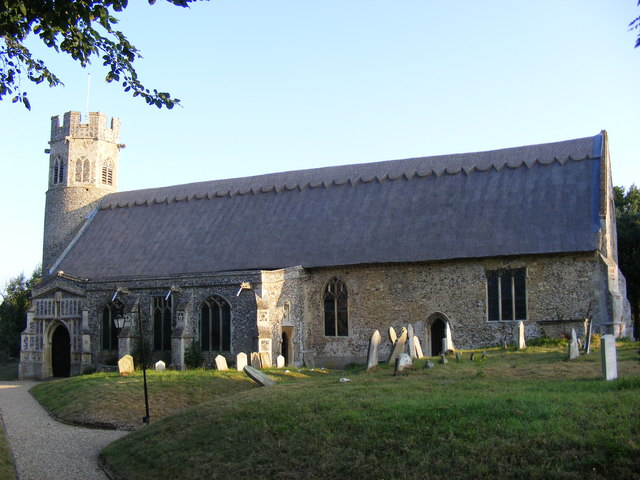
- Church of St Peter
- 52°14′15″N 1°34′05.7″E
- OS grid reference: TM 43729 65918
- Location: Theberton, Suffolk
- Country: England
- Denomination: Church of England

Architecture
- Heritage designation: Grade I
- Designated: 7 December 1966

Administration
- Diocese: St Edmundsbury and Ipswich

St Peter's Church is the parish church of Theberton in Suffolk, England, and in the Diocese of St Edmundsbury and Ipswich. It is a round-tower church, and parts of the building date from the 12th century. The building is Grade I listed.

== Description ==
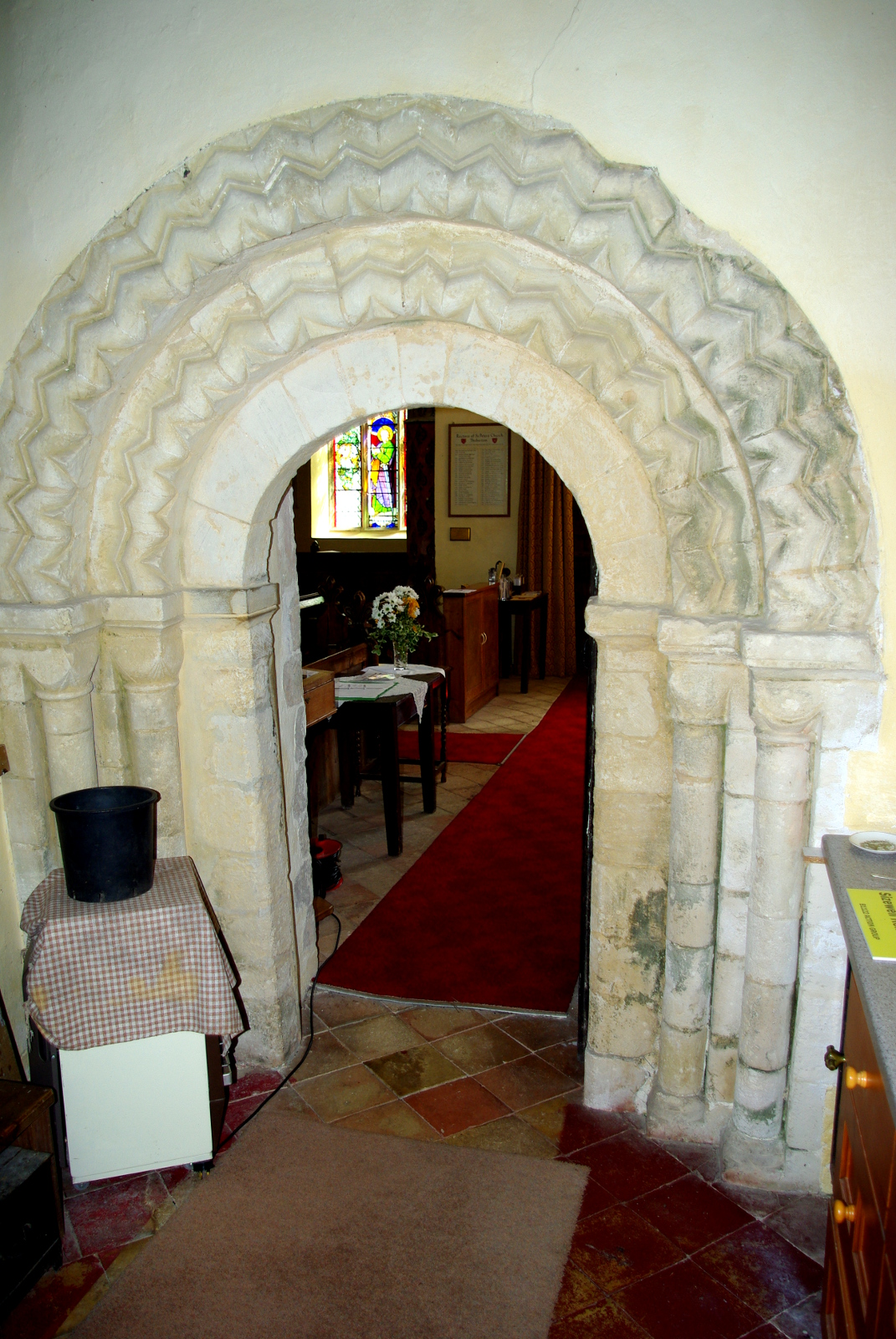
The north doorway

There is a nave and chancel, over which there is a continuous thatched roof, and a south aisle. The nave and the round tower are of the 12th century, with 15th-century windows. The chancel, originally of the 12th century, with a surviving stone corbel table below the eaves, was extended eastward about 1300.

The octagonal upper section of the tower dates from about 1300, with a crenellated parapet of the 15th century, around the base of which are four projecting gargoyles that throw rainwater clear of the walls. The 12th-century north door, now within the 19th-century vestry, has a chevroned arch in two orders, and two orders of colonettes. The south porch, with flushwork decoration, was built about 1470.

The pulpit and octagonal font are of the 15th century; the font has alternating lions and angels around the bowl, and alternationg lions and wodewoses around the stem.

The south aisle was added in the 15th century, and was rebuilt in the 1840s by the Doughty family of Theberton Hall. In the south aisle there is a memorial to Frederica Doughty (died 1843), and a memorial to the writer and explorer Charles Montagu Doughty.

=== The link with Adelaide ===
There are display cases illustrating the link with Adelaide in Australia. William Light, who surveyed the site for the city in 1836, was educated in Theberton by his father's friend Charles Doughty; Thebarton, a suburb of Adelaide, was originally (as Theberton) the name he gave to his house there.

=== Airship ===
A glass case in the porch contains part of the structure of German Zeppelin airship L48. 16 crew members died when the airship was shot down near the village by the Royal Flying Corps on 17 June 1917. The dead were buried in the graveyard extension, and were moved sixty years later to Cannock Chase German Military Cemetery. A memorial service was held at the church on 18 June 2017.
