= Jabal Ferwa =

Jabal Ferwa may refer to:

- Jabal Ferwa (Asir), mountain in Saudi Arabia
- Jabal Ferwa', a mountain peak near Tayma, Saudi Arabia
