= Theberton =

Village in East Suffolk, England

Coordinates: 52.237235°N 1.568352°E

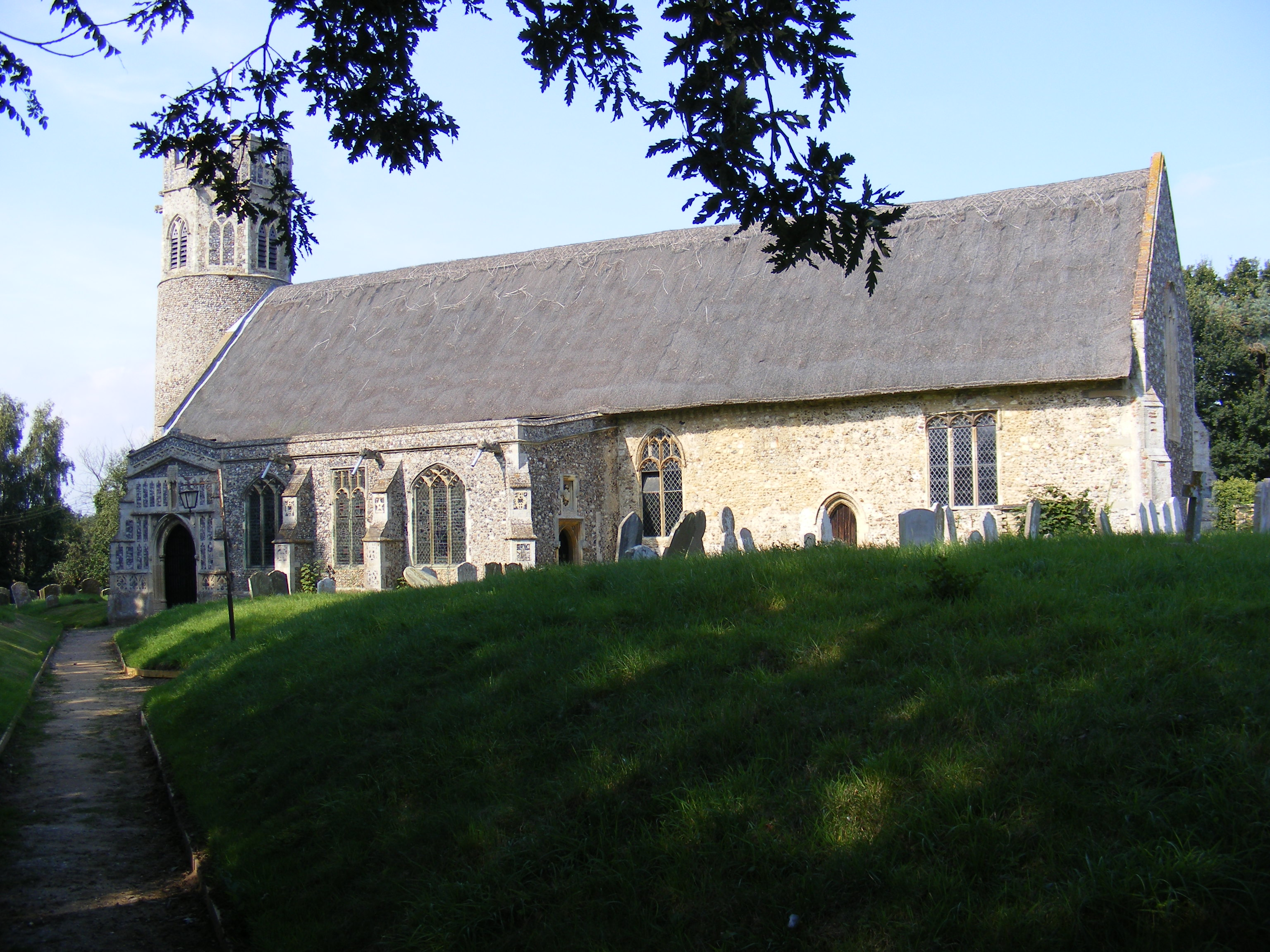
- Church of St Peter, Theberton

- Location within Suffolk
- Population: 279 (2011)
- Civil parish: Theberton
- District: East Suffolk
- Shire county: Suffolk
- Region: East
- Country: England
- Sovereign state: United Kingdom
- Post town: Leiston
- Postcode district: IP16
- Dialling code: 01728
- Police: Suffolk
- Fire: Suffolk
- Ambulance: East of England
- UK Parliament: Suffolk Coastal

Theberton is a village and civil parish in the East Suffolk district of Suffolk, England. It is located 4 miles (6 km) north-east of Saxmundham, and 3 miles (5 km) miles north of Leiston, its post town. In 2011 the parish had a population of 279.

== History ==
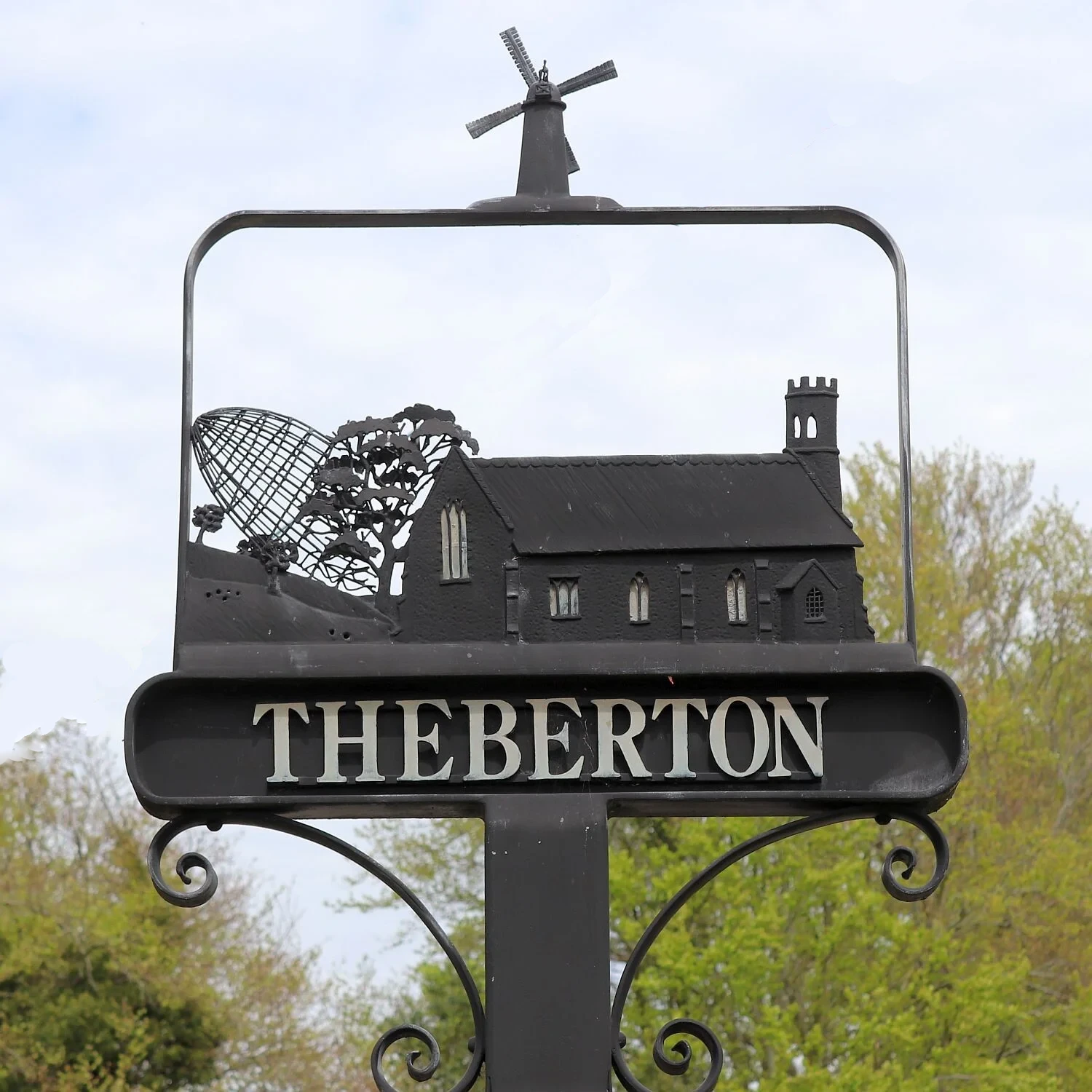
Theberton village sign, showing a crashed Zeppelin at left

During the First World War, a German Zeppelin airship, L48, was shot down near Theberton at 02:00 on the morning of 17 June 1917, by Robert Saundby and others, while it was on a bombing raid. Sixteen members of the crew died in the crash; three survived but one later died from his injuries. The bodies of the crew were buried in a dedicated plot adjacent to the churchyard, with women munition workers voluntarily digging the graves. Local people tended the graves until 1966, when they were reinterred at Cannock Chase German Military Cemetery in Staffordshire. A memorial plaque remains across the road from St Peter's Church, where part of the Zeppelin framework is mounted in the porch.

The village primary school was closed around 1970 and is now used as the village hall. It was renamed Jubilee Hall in 2000 and extensively refurbished in 2012.

== Notable people ==
=== At Theberton Hall ===
William Light, founding father of Adelaide, South Australia, was sent from Penang in about 1792, aged six, to be educated by friends of his father, George and Anne Doughty, who lived at Theberton Hall. George Doughty (d. 21 August 1798) was Sheriff of Suffolk, and it was he who had had Theberton Hall built. His wife, Anne Goodwin, was heiress of Martlesham Hall (died 12 May 1829). Their son was Rev. George Clarke Doughty, also of Theberton Hall.

Charles Montagu Doughty (1843–1926) the traveller and writer, best known for his 1888 travel book Travels in Arabia Deserta, was born at Theberton Hall and is commemorated in the church by a plaque. Theberton Hall was also the birthplace of his nephew, Lt-Col. Charles Doughty-Wylie, who was born in 1868 and killed in battle at Gallipoli in 1915. His bravery earned him the Victoria Cross, awarded posthumously.

=== Robert Howlett ===
The Victorian photographer Robert Howlett was born in Theberton in 1831, the second of four sons of the Rev. Robert Howlett and Harriet Harsant. He is renowned for his iconic photograph of Isambard Kingdom Brunel.

== Heritage buildings ==
=== Theberton Hall ===
Theberton Hall was built for George Doughty (died 21 August 1798) in 1780 or 1792 (architect unknown). In 1852 there were extensive alterations and extensions in Italian Renaissance style, but nearly all of the additions were demolished in the 1920s. It is a two-storey building of yellow brick, stone and with stucco decoration. The central doorway has a porch with square pillars and Ionic columns. The parapet bears the motto "PALMA NON SINE PVLVERE", with the coat of arms above. It remained the home of Charles Montagu Doughty and on 25 October 1951 it was listed as a Grade II heritage-listed building.

The motto comes from the Roman poet Horace, with the literal meaning "no palms without dust" (the palms referring to the prize awarded to the winners of chariot races). It is usually translated as "no reward without effort" and sometimes more recently as "dare to try".

In 1928, Mrs Doughty-Wylie (presumably Lilian, the widow of Charles Doughty-Wylie, and the only woman on the Allied side to visit Gallipoli during the campaign, when she went to lay a wreath on his grave on 17 November 1915 offered "to commemorate the old friendship between the family of the late Colonel Doughty-Wylie and that of Colonel William Light", Theberton Hall and the estate to Adelaide City Council. The estate was described as "690 acres (280 ha) in extent, including 70 acres (28 ha) of matured woodlands", while the house had "six reception rooms and 18 bed and dressing rooms". The Council referred the matter to High Commission of Australia, London for consideration. The investigators reported that the residence was said to be in poor repair, and would require immediate expenditure of £7,000 to £8,000, as well as ongoing expense, and so the Council declined the offer.

== Twinning ==
Theberton is twinned with Thebarton, a suburb of Adelaide in South Australia. Thebarton is named after the home of William Light, which he named Theberton House.
