= Robert Saundby =

Air Marshal Sir Robert Saundby KCB, KBE, MC, DFC, AFC, FRAeS, FRES, DL
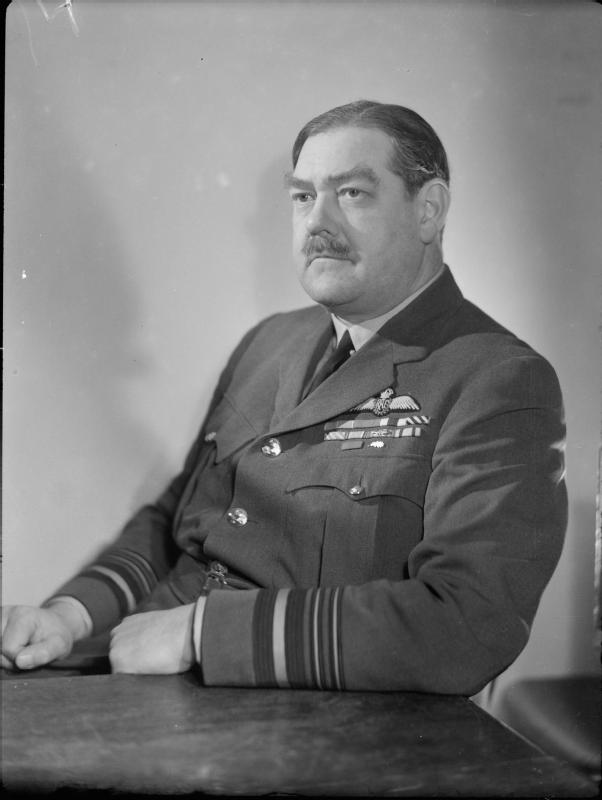
- Born: 26 April 1896; Birmingham, England
- Died: 26 September 1971 (aged 75); Hamstead Marshall, Berkshire, England
- Military career
- Allegiance: United Kingdom
- Branch: British Army (1914–18); Royal Air Force (1918–46)
- Service years: 1914–1946
- Rank: Air Marshal
- Nickname: Sandy
- Commands: Aden Flight
- Conflicts: First World War; Second World War
- Awards: Knight Commander of the Order of the Bath; Knight Commander of the Order of the British Empire; Military Cross; Distinguished Flying Cross; Air Force Cross; Mentioned in Despatches (4); Officer of the Legion of Honour (France); Commander of the Legion of Merit (United States); Grand Officer of the Order of Leopold II (Belgium); Croix de Guerre (Belgium)

Air Marshal Sir Robert Henry Magnus Spencer Saundby, KCB, KBE, MC, DFC, AFC, FRAeS, FRES, DL (26 April 1896 – 26 September 1971) was a senior Royal Air Force officer whose career spanned both the First and Second World Wars. He distinguished himself by gaining five victories during the First World War, and was present during the air battle when Lanoe Hawker was shot down and killed by Manfred von Richthofen, the "Red Baron". He is chiefly remembered for his role as Deputy Air Officer Commanding-on-Chief Bomber Command under Sir Arthur Harris during the latter part of the Second World War.

== Early life ==
Robert Henry Magnus Spencer Saundby was born on 26 April 1896 at 83A Edmund Street in Birmingham. He was the son of Robert Saundby (1849-1918), FRCP, and Edith Mary, née Spencer. His father was initially a tea planter in India before becoming a distinguished physician (having been elected senior president of the Edinburgh Royal Medical Society as a student, and later president of the British Medical Association) and professor of medicine at Mason University College and Birmingham University; his 'compendious knowledge of medicine, administrative ability and great energy' (which unfortunately came with irritability and lack of patience that detracted from his teaching) produced books on diseases of the digestive system, old age, and medical ethics, amongst other subjects.

Educated at King Edward's School, Saundby left in 1913 and joined the Traffic Department of the London and North Western Railway.

== First World War ==
Saundby began the First World War serving in the British Army. On 15 June 1914 he was commissioned into the Royal Warwickshire Regiment, Territorial Force.

An attack of cerebrospinal meningitis in February 1915 saw Saundby out of action for 8 months. It was not until 11 October that he was passed fit and on 23 October he applied to the Royal Flying Corps.

It was January 1916 when Saundby was seconded to the Royal Flying Corps. Saundby's flying career began at Thetford in Norfolk as part of No. 12 Reserve Squadron on 28 February 1916. He flew solo just over a month later on 31 March and gained further experience flying with the squadron at Dover. Saundby then attended the Central Flying School (CFS) at Upavon. He saw further service with No. 40 Squadron at Gosport. Of his experiences in this period, Saundby wrote -

I have never found it necessary to modify the opinion which I formed at the time that, with the exception of the C.F.S. and one or two individuals, the standard of flying training was on the whole extremely bad. The instructor felt no responsibility for his pupils' flying and invariably explained away their crashes by reporting that they were hopeless idiots, better dead, of whom nothing could reasonably be expected.

— Robert Saundby

Saundby became a qualified pilot and joined Britain's first single-seater fighter squadron, No. 24 Squadron RFC, in its original complement under famous Major Lanoe Hawker, flying the Airco DH2 on the Western Front. His initial successes began on 31 July 1916; he drove down a Fokker Eindekker out of control, and was slightly wounded in the process.

On 17 November 1916 Saundby's brother, Second Lieutenant William Spencer Fitz-Robert Saundby, also of the Royal Flying Corp, was killed in action at 19 years of age. It was initially hoped he had been made a prisoner of war following a forced landing but it turned out not to be the case. He is remembered on the Arras Flying Services Memorial.

Saundby transferred from No. 24 Squadron to No. 41 Squadron on 26 January 1917. On 4 March, while flying FE.8 Serial No. 6431, he shared a victory over an Albatros. Following this win, he transferred to Home Defence in Britain. He had shot down 9 aircraft over the Western Front by this point.

On 13 April 1917 Saundby was at Orford Ness RFC Experimental Station, England. On 17 June 1917 he was flying one of three aircraft, one of 37 Squadron RFC and two others from the Experimental Station that intercepted the Zeppelin L48 (Imperial German Navy Designation LZ 95) after she got lost trying to bomb London. As a result of their attacks, L48 crashed near Theberton. The victory was shared among the three air crews. Saundby not only became an ace with this win, he was awarded the Military Cross. One of only two German survivors of the engagement, Otto Mieth, died in Iringa, Tanganyika in 1956. He had lived there since 1928 and had his own construction company.

In the preface to Saundby's book Flying Colours (1919), Major General E. B. Ashmore wrote that Saundby was "one of a very gallant band of pilots who fought under the late Major Lanoe Hawker VC DSO during the Somme offensive of 1916."

== Interwar period ==
In 1919 Saundby received a permanent commission into the Royal Air Force (RAF). This period also saw him taking the sea plane course at Lee-on-Solent, studying at the RAF and Naval Cooperation School at Calshot and being awarded the Air Force Cross.

Between 1919 and 1925, Robert Saundby moved slowly through the ranks of the newly formed RAF, while gaining experience of command. Between 1922 and 1925 he served as a Flight Commander in No. 45 Squadron, based at Almaza, Cairo. Flying the Vickers Vernon transport aircraft. He flew as co-pilot for the then Squadron Leader Arthur Harris, when the latter developed a locally improvised bombing capability for the Vernon.

April 1922 was Saundby's first flight to Baghdad. In February, March, November and December 1923 he participated in bombing operations. This was a policy known as 'aerial policing'. He moved on to become an instructor in Egypt with No. 4 Flying Training School at Abu Sueir, Egypt. However, this lasted for only two months when he was given command of the Aden Flight. This was due to a sudden illness affecting the sitting commander. Saudby initially disliked the posting but grew to appreciate the experience. It proved to be the only command of his career.

Saundby's move towards the upper command ranks of the RAF was initiated when he joined No. 58 Squadron as a Flight Commander on 15 October 1926. With the squadron he flew the Vickers Virginia and Vickers Victoria aircraft at RAF Worthy Down. His squadron commander was Wing Commander Arthur Harris, and the squadron concentrated on developing night bombing techniques such as target-marking in their 70 mph machines. The other squadron at Worthy Down at the time, No. 7, was commanded by Wing Commander Charles Portal, later to become Chief of Air Staff during the Second World War and the direct superior and sometimes opponent of Harris.

In 1927–28 Saundby attended the RAF Staff College before being posted to the Wessex bombing area staff. By this period he had logged over 2000 flying hours, however his flying career was drawing to a close as he rose into more staff positions.

At the rank of wing commander, Saundby attended the Imperial Defence College in 1933. He also worked for two years at the RAF Staff College, Andover as an instructor. In 1937, Saundby was appointed Deputy Director of Operations. From there he became Deputy Director (and subsequently Director) of Operational Requirements and Assistant Chief of Staff (Operational Requirements and Tactics). He held these posts between 1938 and 1940, also rising to Air Vice-Marshall in this period.

== Second World War ==
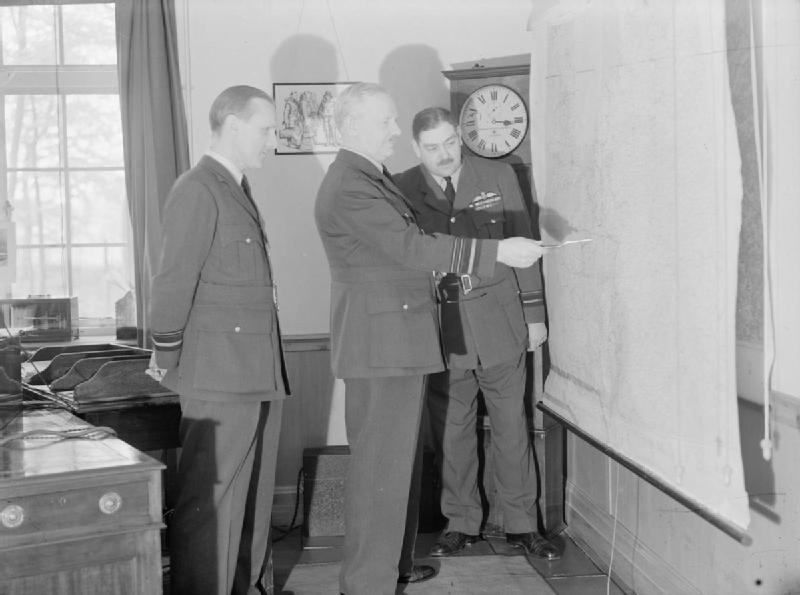
Air Marshal Arthur Harris studies a map of Germany with Air Vice Marshal Ronald Graham (left), the Air Officer Administration at BCHQ, and Air Vice Marshal Saundby (right), Harris's Senior Air Staff Officer.

By 1940, Saundby had become Senior Air Staff Officer (SASO), HQ Bomber Command. He served under Air Marshal Richard Peirse, and continued in this position when Peirse was replaced with Arthur Harris in February 1942.

February 1943 saw Saundby appointed to the post of deputy air officer commanding-in-chief. He was an advocate for the strategy of attacking German military industries and the morale of the German population by bombing German industrial areas and cities. He was a key deputy for Harris throughout the remainder of the war. On behalf of Harris he selected 94 German towns which were "fitted" for carpet bombing and gave codenames to each of them known as 'Fish code'; for example Nuremberg was codenamed Grayling and Berlin was Whitebait. It is thought that he chose this coding because he was a keen fly fisherman. He retired on medical grounds from the RAF on 22 March 1946.

The medical grounds for Saundby's retirement were the result of injuries (osteoarthritic lumbar spine and an osteoarthritic hip) sustained in a crash 30 years previously.

Saundby was awarded the Order of Leopold II with Palme and Croix de Guerre for services in the liberation of Belgium.

== Retirement ==
Saundby devoted much of his retirement to his role as Vice-Chairman, Council of Territorial and Auxiliary Forces Association, for which he was appointed a Knight Commander of the Order of the Bath.

Saundby was the chair of the council of Royal Air Forces Association (as well as life vice-president), president of the Royal British Legion (metropolitan area) and in 1960 was appointed deputy-lieutenant for Berkshire. Fly-fishing was a great passion and Saundby also became the president of the Piscatorial Society, editing their centenary publication The Book of the Piscatorial Society 1836–1936.

Saundby was also a keen lepidopterist, and in 1950, he was elected a Fellow of the Royal Entomological Society. In retirement at Oxleas House in Burghclere, Hampshire, he made light-trap records in his garden and entomologized the woods of West Berkshire. His work in this field saw him record 44 species of butterfly and 501 larger moths. His collection was described as "a model of good arrangement and documentation", and was presented to the Natural History Museum in London.

Saundby had many hobbies, and wrote several books on differing subjects including his role in the RAF during the war (Air Bombardment, The Story of its Development, How the Bomber and the Missile Brought the Third Dimension to Warfare) and Steam Engines (Early British Steam 1825–1925: The First 100 Years).

Saundby died on 26 September 1971 at Edgecombe Nursing Home, Hamstead Marshall in Berkshire. His ashes were scattered by the River Avon at Netheravon.

== Family ==
On 10 January 1931, Saundby married Joyce Mary Rees-Webbe. They met when she came with her father, Major Marmaduke Oswald Norman Rees-Webbe, on a fly-fishing trip. Together they had a son and two daughters.

== Influence on literature ==
Kurt Vonnegut quotes his foreword to David Irving's The Destruction of Dresden in his novel Slaughterhouse-Five.

== Popular culture ==
Saundby appears in the wartime propaganda file Target for Tonight. Saundby was portrayed in the 1989 television drama Bomber Harris by Bernard Kay.
