= William McMurdo =

British Army general

General Sir William McMurdo GCB
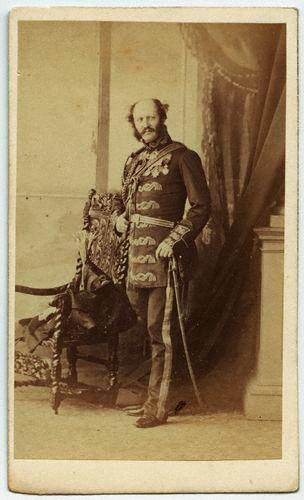
- Carte de visite of William McMurdo, early 1860s
- Born: William Montagu Scott McMurdo; 30 May 1819
- Died: 2 March 1894 (aged 74)
- Relatives: Charles Montagu Doughty (son in-law); Dorothy Doughty (granddaughter)
- Military career
- Allegiance: United Kingdom
- Branch: British Army
- Rank: General
- Units: 8th Regiment of Foot; 28th (North Gloucestershire) Regiment of Foot; 78th Highlanders
- Commands: Land Transport Corps; Cheshire Regiment; 69th (South Lincolnshire) Regiment of Foot; The East Yorkshire Regiment
- Conflicts: Conquest of Sindh: Battle of Miani; Battle of Hyderabad; Crimean War
- Awards: Knight Commander of the Order of the Bath; Légion d'honneur (France); Order of the Mejidiye (Turkey)

Sir William Montagu Scott McMurdo GCB (30 May 1819 – 2 March 1894) was a British Army officer who rose to the rank of general. He saw active service in India, helped to run a military railway in the Crimean War and then managed various groups of volunteers working with the army. He was eventually knighted.

== Biography ==
He was the son of Lieutenant-Colonel Archibald McMurdo of Loch Arthur, Kirkcudbrightshire and commissioned in the 8th Foot in 1837. In 1841 he became lieutenant in the 22nd Foot which went to India that year. There he served under Sir Charles Napier and in 1843 was involved in the battles of Miani and Hyderabad. In the latter he was wounded and also mentioned in dispatches. Later that year he was promoted to captain in the 28th Foot but then transferred to the 78th Highlanders. In 1844 he married Napier's daughter, Susan Sarah Napier, 1827-1912. When Napier returned to India in 1849, McMurdo went with him as his aide-de-camp.

In 1853 he was promoted to lieutenant-colonel and acted as assistant adjutant-general in Dublin. The following year he was appointed director-general of the newly formed Land Transport Corps and went to Crimea to assist in running the Grand Crimean Central Railway. He eventually took it over from the contractors Peto, Brassey and Betts. He received from the French the Légion d'honneur (fourth class) and from the Turks the Mejidiye (fourth class). After the end of the Crimean War the Land Transport Corps was converted into the Military Train in 1857 and McMurdo was made its colonel-commander. From 1860 he became involved with the volunteers working with the army and became the inspector-general of volunteers. In 1865 he established the Engineer and Volunteers Staff Corps. He also became the colonel of the Inns of Court Volunteers and of the Engineer and Volunteers Staff Corps.

From 1866 to 1870 he commanded a brigade in the Dublin district, then in the Rawalpindi district in Bengal from 1870 to 1873. He was promoted major-general in 1868, lieutenant-general in 1876 and general in 1878. He was colonel of the 69th Foot in 1876, then transferred to the 15th Foot in 1877 and the 22nd Foot (Cheshire Regiment) in 1888. In 1881 he was made KCB and subsequently GCB in 1893. He was a councillor of the Oxford Military College in Cowley and Oxford Oxfordshire from 1876 to 1894. He died in Nice in 1894.

His daughter Caroline Amelia married the explorer and writer Charles Montagu Doughty; their elder daughter Dorothy Doughty was a sculptor and potter.

Military offices
Preceded by Ernest Frederick Gascoigne	Colonel of the 69th (South Lincolnshire) Regiment of Foot; 1876–1877	Succeeded by David Mackirdy
Preceded by Thomas Drought	Colonel of The East Yorkshire Regiment; 1877–1888	Succeeded by Edward George Wynyard
Preceded by Frederick Darley George	Colonel of The Cheshire Regiment; 1888–1894	Succeeded by David Anderson
