= Jabal Ferwa' =

Jebal Farwa'
- Location in Saudi Arabia
- Coordinates: 27°37′47″N 38°32′38″E

Jabal Ferwa' is a mountain in Saudi Arabia located near 27° 50' 27" N 38° 06' 41" E, northwest of Tayma, Saudi Arabia. It is located at an elevation of 1,030 metres (3,379 ft) above sea level.
