= Dorothy Doughty =

British sculptor and potter

Dorothy Susan Doughty (Sanremo 1892 – 6 October 1962) was a British sculptor and potter, much of whose best work was produced for Royal Worcester, specialising in representations of birds.

== Early life and education ==
She was the elder daughter of poet, writer, and traveller Charles Montagu Doughty and Caroline Amelia, daughter of General Sir William Montagu Scott McMurdo. Her father was great-grandson of the politician and judge Beaumont Hotham, 2nd Baron Hotham.

Doughty was educated at Eastbourne School of Art, where she became a keen naturalist and ornithologist. Her sister, Frederica Gertrude ("Freda"; 1895-1972) was also a sculptor and potter, including working with her sister for Royal Worcester.

== Career ==
Doughty is mostly known for her collection of porcelain American birds. She modeled a series of thirty-six pairs and three individual models of American birds, which were designed between 1933 and 1960. They were produced by Royal Worcester, a British porcelain firm. An entire series of her porcelain birds are exhibited at the Stark Museum of Art in Orange, Texas and The Art Collection at Hebrew Home at Riverdale in Riverdale, New York, and at Audubon House of Pelican Island Audubon Society in Vero Beach, Florida. Towards the end of her life, she also designed British birds, which were put into production after her death.

She and her sister Freda lived together in Kent, later moving to a cliff-top house with a shared garden studio at Falmouth, Cornwall. Where Dorothy specialized in birds, Freda's artistic focus was on depictions of children; so popular were two of her designs that they were credited with having "single-handedly kept the factory open" during a sales lull in the 1950s.

== Later life and death ==
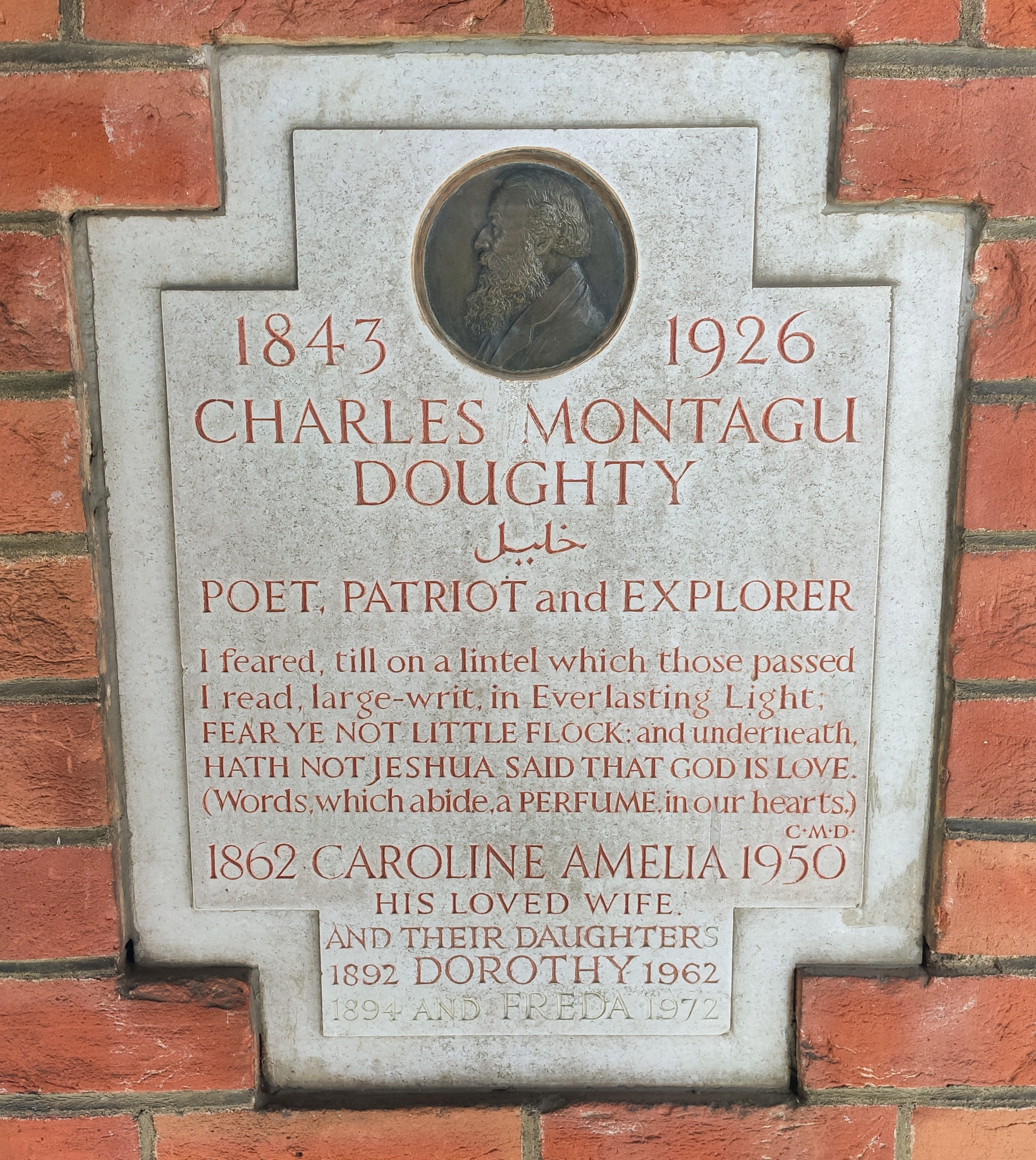
Plaque dedicated to Doughty and her parents at Golders Green Crematorium

Doughty was cremated at Golders Green Crematorium.

== Bibliography ==
- Savage, George. The American Birds of Dorothy Doughty. Worcester: Worcester Royal Porcelain Co, 1962. OCLC 192167614
