= Zeppelin LZ 95 =

1917 military airship by Zeppelin

LZ 95 (L 48)
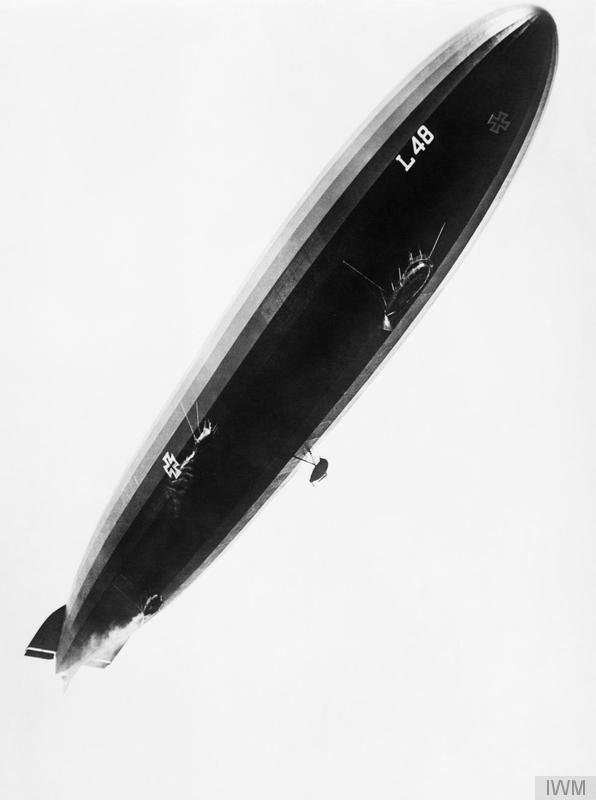

General information
- National origin: German Empire
- Built by: Luftschiffbau Zeppelin
- Service: Imperial German Navy

History
- First flight: 22 May 1917
- Last flight: 17 June 1917 (shot down)

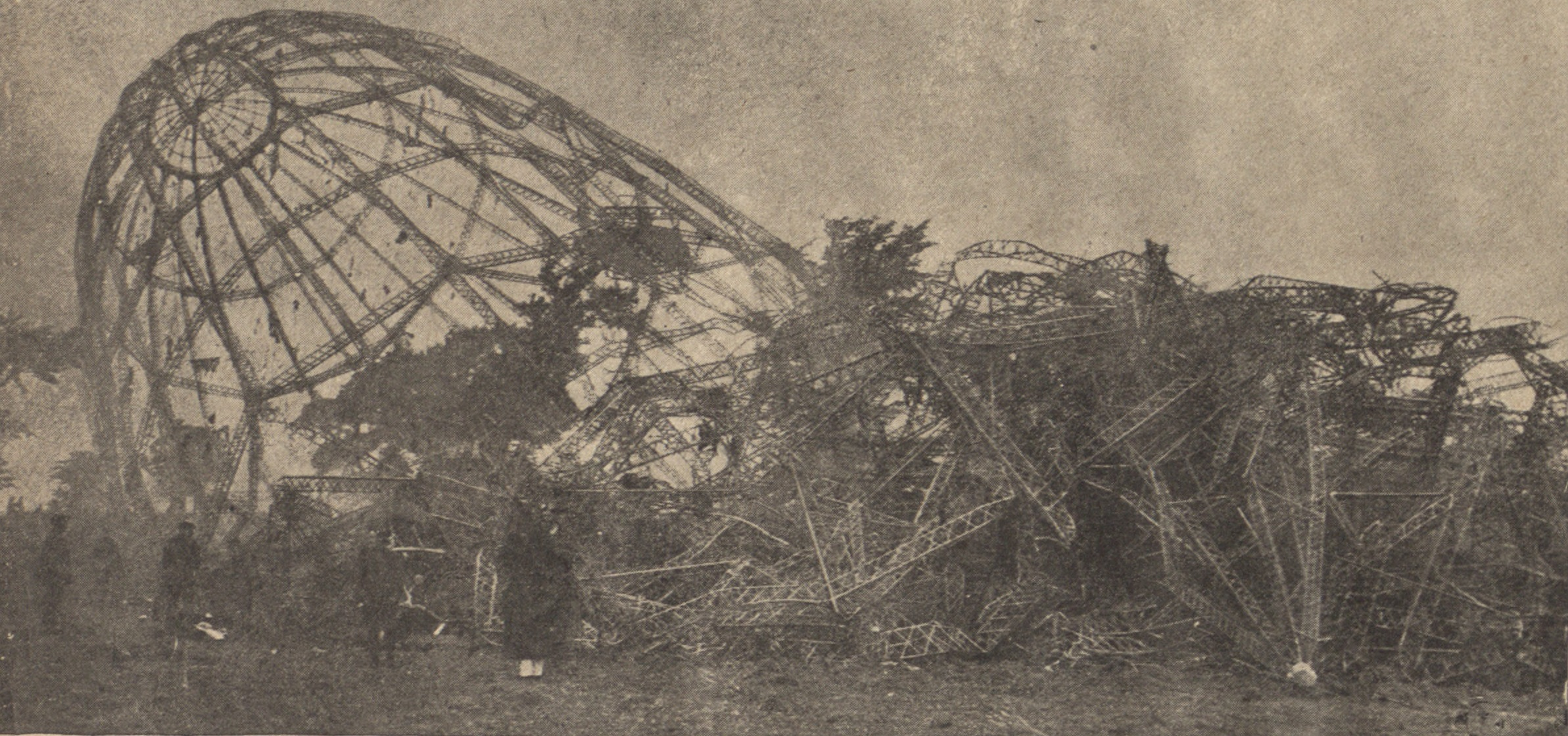
Wreckage of Zeppelin LZ 95 (L 48), near Leiston

Zeppelin LZ 95 (L 48) was a U-class zeppelin of the Imperial German Military.

== Career ==
One successful reconnaissance mission. L 48 and its U-class sister Airships were designed to fly as high as 20,000 feet (6,100 m).

== Destruction ==
L 48 joined an attempted attack on London with 4 other Zeppelins, L 42, L 44, L 45 and L 47. Commanded by George Eichler, on his thirteenth raid, it became lost and was intercepted and destroyed by Royal Aircraft Factory B.E.12, serial No. 6110, flown by Canadian pilot Second Lieutenant Loudon Pierce Watkins. He was attached to No. 37 Squadron of British Royal Flying Corps (RFC) fighters. Watkins had enlisted with his three brothers. He had been based in the UK, as home defence, since 11 December 1916. Watkins shot down L 48 over water near Great Yarmouth on 17 June 1917 but it crashed near Theberton, Suffolk, a village near the town of Leiston. There were three survivors; the remainder of the crew were buried at St Peter's Church, Theberton, later to be exhumed and reburied at Cannock Chase.

Of the seven Zeppelins lost over England that were shot down in 1917 during the First World War, L 48 was the only one shot down by the RFC's Home defense.

== Specifications (LZ 95 / Type u zeppelin) ==
Data from Zeppelin : rigid airships, 1893-1940

General characteristics

- Crew: 19
- Capacity: 39,000 kg (85,980 lb) typical disposable load
- Length: 196.4 m (644 ft 4 in)
- Diameter: 23.9 m (78 ft 5 in)
- Fineness ratio: 8.22
- Volume: 55,795 m^{3} (1,970,400 cu ft)
- Empty weight: 25,750 kg (56,769 lb)
- Useful lift: 64,750 kg (142,750 lb)
- Powerplant: 5 × Maybach HS Lu 6-cylinder water-cooled in-line piston engines, 180 kW (240 hp) each
- Propellers: 2-bladed Lorenzen propellers

Performance

- Maximum speed: 107.6 km/h (66.9 mph, 58.1 kn)
- Range: 7,400 km (4,600 mi, 4,000 nmi)
- Service ceiling: 5,500 m (18,000 ft) static

Armament

- Guns: defensive machine-guns in gondolas and envelope top gun positions
- Bombs: provision for bombs

== See also ==
- List of Zeppelins
