= Land of Tema =

Tayma
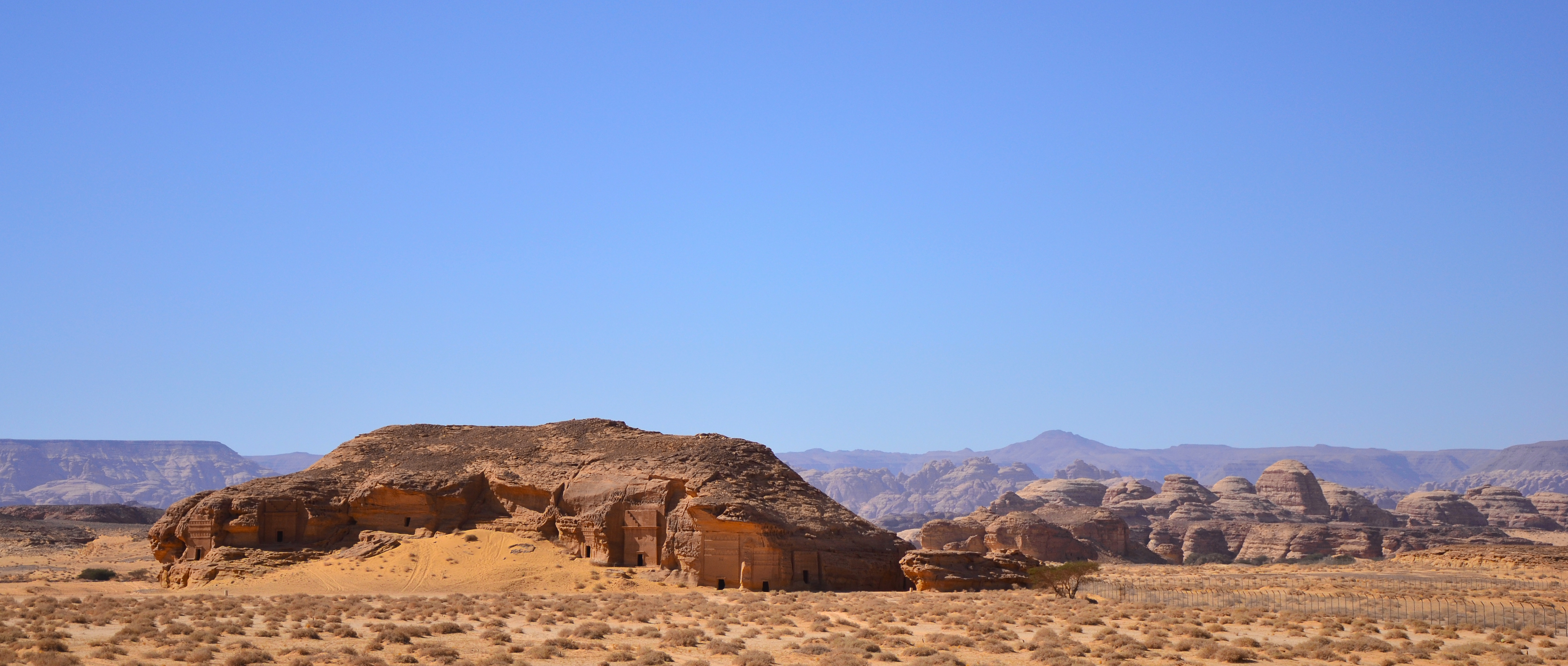
- Landscape near Tema

- Location in Saudi Arabia
- Coordinates: 27°37′47″N 38°32′38″E

The Land of Tema, Te'-ma, Tema (Arabic: تيماء, romanized: Taymā'; Hebrew: תֵּימָן, romanized: Tēmān, lit. 'south country') or Thaiman is a place mentioned in the Bible where the descendants of Ishmael's son Tema dwelt. It was most likely in northern Saudi Arabia and has been identified with the modern Teima', an oasis (fitting with the description in Jeremiah) which lies about 200 miles (320 km) north of Medina, and some 40 miles (64 km) south of Dumat, or Duma, now known as el-Jauf. Teima' is on the ancient caravan road connecting the Persian Gulf with the Gulf of Aqaba which in antiquity brought wealth to the town. Doughty has described at Teima the ruins of an old city wall 3 miles (4.8 km) in circuit. An Aramaic stele recently discovered, belonging to the 6th century BC, shows the influence of Assyrian in the town. The place is mentioned in the cuneiform inscriptions. The possibility of its being on a trade route is supported by the reference in Job 6:19. It is often associated with the Land of Dumah.

The Bible mentions Tema several times, including Isaiah 21:14; Jeremiah 25:23, 49:7, 49:20; Obadiah 1:9; and Amos 1:12. One of the protagonists in Job is Eliphaz the Temanite, and Genesis 36 refers to Husham of the land of the Temanites.

Outside of the Bible, it was mentioned by Ptolemy, Pliny, Agatharchides, and Josephus. It was noted as halfway between Damascus and Mecca, and between Babylonia and Egypt. Yaqut mentions that in the Middle Ages, it was inhabited by a Jewish Community. Nabunaid of Babylon captured the city and settled there until Cyrus the Great captured the city and moved him to Carmania.
