= Hans Hahn (night fighter pilot) =

- Born: 21 February 1919; Rheydt, Germany
- Died: 11 October 1941 (aged 22); Grantham, England
- Burial place: Cannock Chase German war cemetery, England
- Military career
- Allegiance: Nazi Germany
- Branch: Luftwaffe
- Service years: 1940–1941
- Rank: Leutnant (second lieutenant)
- Unit: NJG 2
- Conflicts: World War II: Defense of the Reich
- Awards: Knight's Cross of the Iron Cross

Hans Hahn (21 February 1919 – 11 October 1941) was a Luftwaffe night fighter ace and recipient of the Knight's Cross of the Iron Cross during World War II. The Knight's Cross of the Iron Cross, and its variants were the highest awards in the military and paramilitary forces of Nazi Germany during World War II; his was the first awarded to a night fighter.

== Death ==
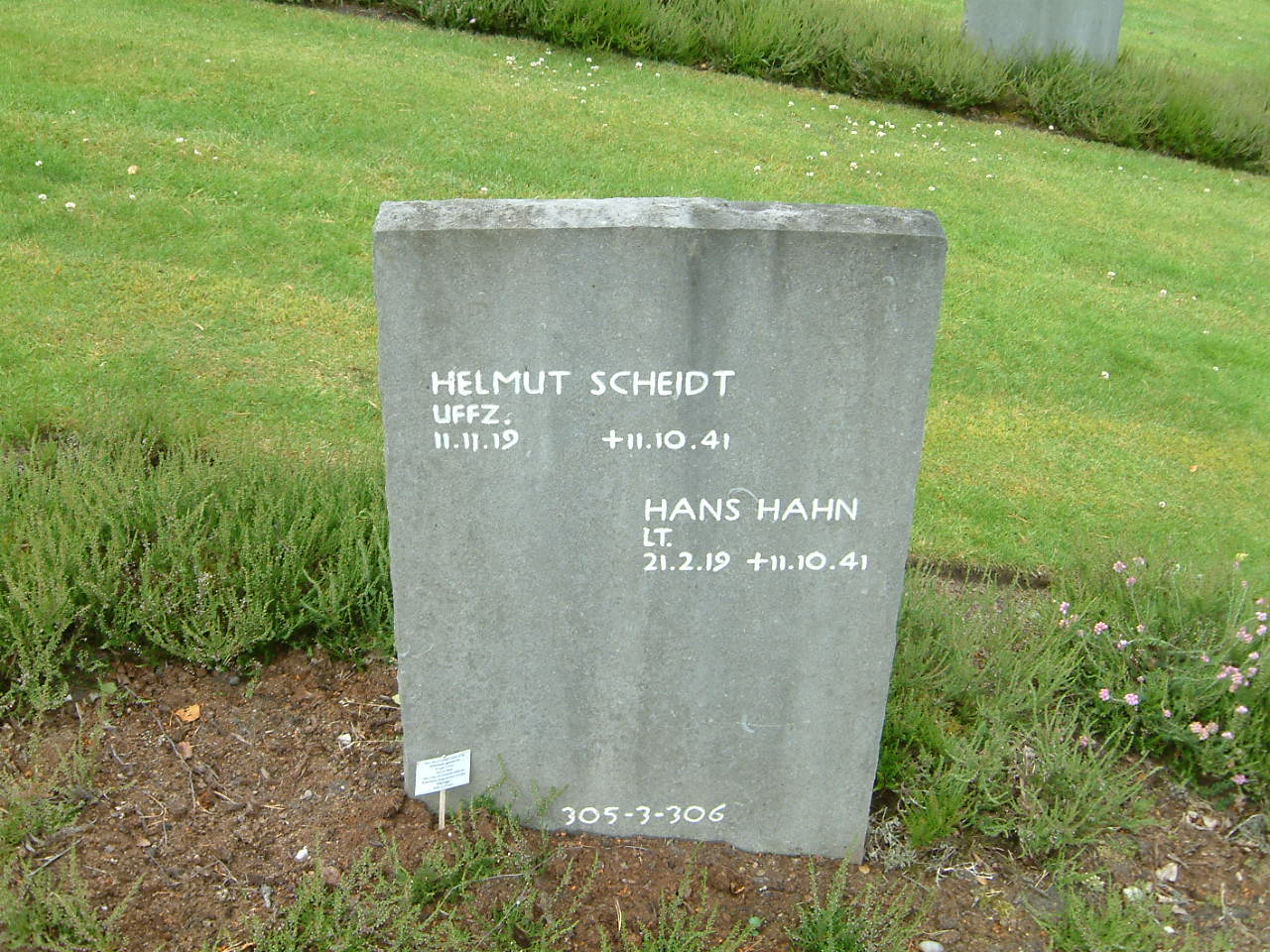
Graves of Hans Hahn (1919–1941) and Helmut Scheidt (1919–1941), Deutsch Soldatenfriedhof Cannock Chase, Staffordshire, England

Hans Hahn was killed near Grantham, England, on 11 October 1941 after his JU 88 collided with a RAF Oxford trainer aircraft he targeted. He is buried at Cannock Chase German war cemetery.

== Summary of career ==
=== Aerial victory claims ===
During his career he claimed twelve aerial victories, all of them at night. (Note: For a list of Luftwaffe night fighter aces see List of German World War II night fighter aces)

Most successful Night Fighter pilot until his death. On five occasions, he returned to his base at Gilze-Rijen on one engine. Once he returned with a balloon cable wrapped around his wing in his C-4.

Chronicle of aerial victories
Claim	Date	Time	Type	Location	Serial No./Squadron No.
– 3. Staffel of Nachtjagdgeschwader 2 –
1	24 October 1940	23:02	Wellington	vicinity of Linton-on-Ouse	
2	2 January 1941	19:00	Whitley	50 km (31 mi) east of Withernsea	
3	13 March 1941	01:15	Hudson	vicinity of Leeming	
4	13 March 1941	22:00	Blenheim	vicinity of Waddington	
5	8 April 1941	01:43	Hereford	Wellingore	
6	9 April 1941	00:40	Wellington	vicinity of Upwood	
7	17 April 1941	01:22	Hampden	southeast of Waddington	
8	21 April 1941	03:30	Hereford	vicinity of Digby	
9	3 May 1941	01:20	Stirling	vicinity of Oakington	
10	4 May 1941	03:10	Fulmar	Stoke Holy Cross	
11	5 May 1941	01:12	Blenheim	vicinity of Feltwell	
13	12/13 October 1941	—	Oxford	vicinity of Grantham	Oxford AB767/No. 12 Flying Training School RAF

=== Awards ===
- Aviator badge
- Front Flying Clasp of the Luftwaffe
- Iron Cross (1939)
  - 2nd Class
  - 1st Class
- Knight's Cross of the Iron Cross on 9 July 1941 as Leutnant and pilot in the I./Nachtjagdgeschwader 2 (Note: According to Scherzer as pilot in the 3./Nachtjagdgeschwader 2.)
