= Pharaonic Tayma inscription =

The Pharaonic Tayma inscription is a hieroglyphic petroglyph found near the oasis of Tayma in Tabuk Region, Saudi Arabia. It was discovered by local archaeologists in 2010. The rock engraving was found around 400 km north of Madinah and northeast of the ancient Nabatean site of Madain Saleh. It marks the first confirmed hieroglyphic epigraph discovered in the Kingdom. It reads:

"'The King of Upper and Lower Egypt, Lord of the Two Lands, User-Maat-Ra, beloved of Amun' -- 'The Son of Ra, Lord of Crowns, Ramesses, ruler of Iunu' -- 'Beloved of the "Great Ruler of All Lands'".

According to the SCTA Vice President for Antiquities and Museums Ali Ibrahim Al-Ghabban, the petroglyph contains an inscription belonging to the 20th Dynasty Pharaoh Ramses III (r.1192 BC to 1160 BC).

== The ancient trade route between Egypt and the Arabian Peninsula ==
The route of this road is marked by cartouches (royal signatures) of Pharaoh Ramseses III, placed on its water sources in the Sinai Peninsula and the Arabian Peninsula. This road passes after the Nile Valley, by Suez, where there is a temple for Pharaoh Ramseses III, then it goes by the Red Sea to Sarabit el-Khadim, near the port of Abu Zenima on the Gulf of Suez, where inscriptions of King Ramses III were also found. Then it crosses the Sinai Peninsula horizontally and passes by the watering place of Wadi Abu Ghada near the oasis of Nakhl, where a double cartouche similar to the cartouche of Tayma was also found bearing the name of King Ramseses III. Then the road heads to the head of the Gulf of Aqaba and passes by the site of Nahal and then the site of Tamnia, where a double cartouche of Pharaoh Ramseses III was found similar to the cartouche of Tayma. There is also a reference in a papyrus of Pharaoh Ramseses III to his sending people to bring copper from a neighboring nation.

Discovering this road will spark a turning point in the study of the roots of civilizational relations between Egypt and the Arabian Peninsula. This road wasn't used for a single occasion, and more information will be revealed in the future. It's also expected that there will be other cartouches along the road's path - for Ramseses III or other Egyptian pharaohs, in the Hasma area, which separates - with a length of 400 km - Tayma from the head of the Gulf of Aqaba. It's prominent of its beautifully formed rock facades suitable for writing and engraving. The Saudi Ministry of Tourism is working on managing a precise archaeological survey of this area.
