= Tayma =

City and Governorate in Tabuk Province, Saudi Arabia

Tayma Governorate محافظة تيماء
- City and Governorate
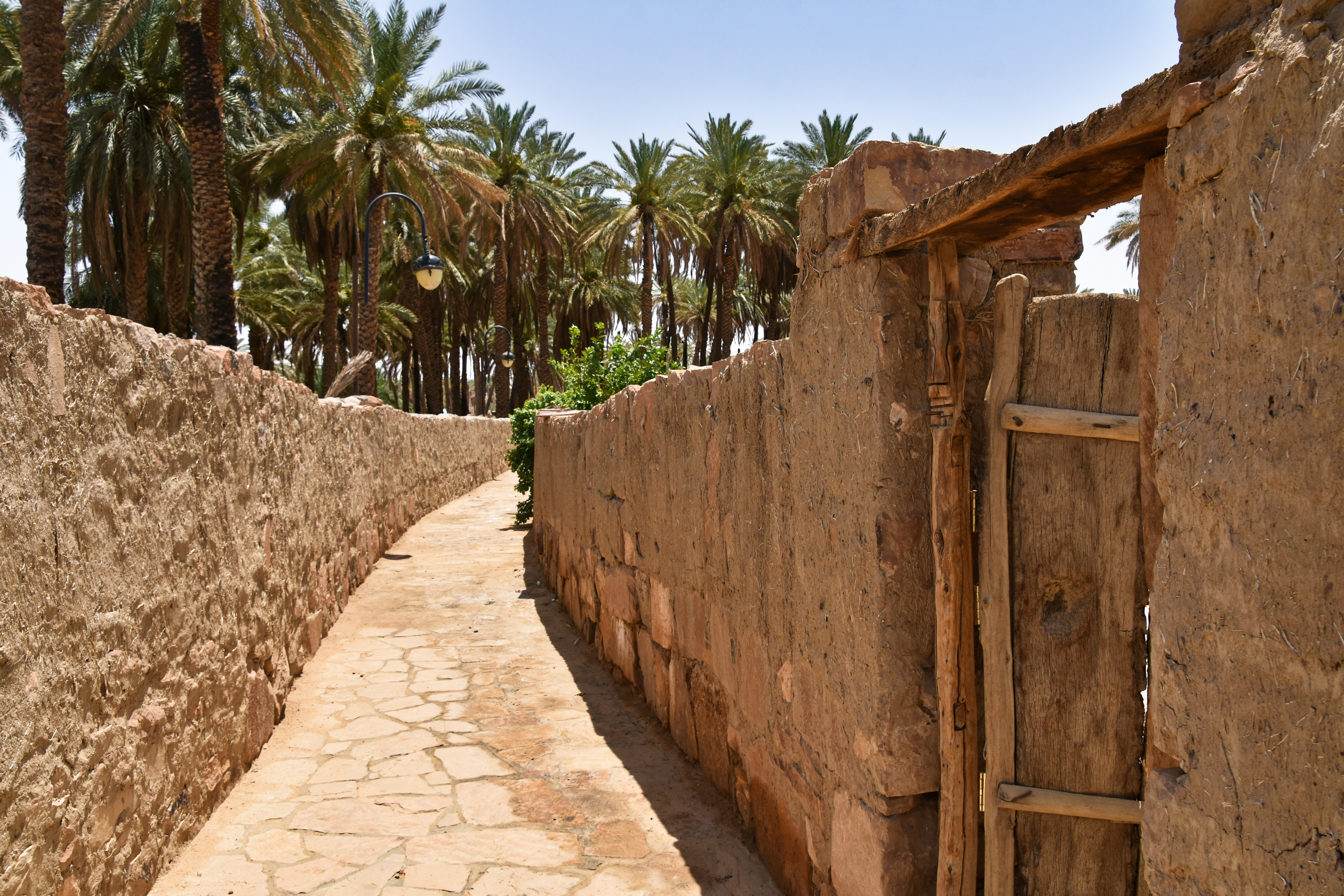
- Old Town of Tayma

- Map Showing the Governorate’s Location within Tabuk Province

- Location of Tayma in Saudi Arabia
- Coordinates: 27°37′47″N 38°32′38″E
- Country: Saudi Arabia
- Province: Tabuk Province
- Region: Hejaz
- Seat: Tayma City

Government
  - Type: Municipality
  - Body: Tayma Municipality

Area
  - City and Governorate: 40,000 km^{2} (15,000 sq mi)

Population (2022)
  - Metro: 42,164 (Tayma Governorate)
- Time zone: UTC+03:00 (SAST)
- Area code: 014

Tayma /ˈteɪmə/ (Arabic: تيماء, romanized: Taymāʾ; Taymanitic: 𐪉𐪃𐪑, tmʾ, vocalized as: Taymāʾ), also spelled Tema, is a Saudi city and governorate, in Tabuk Province, and major oasis with a long history of habitation.

It is located in northwestern Saudi Arabia at the point where the trade route between Medina and Dumah (Sakaka) begins to cross in the western portion of the Nafud desert. Tayma lies about 264 km (164 mi) southeast of Tabuk and approximately 400 km (250 mi) north of Medina.

== History ==
Tayma is one of the largest archaeological sites in Saudi Arabia. It was a major oasis city in ancient times, and its geographic position made it a major point along the trade route that connected South Arabia with the Eastern Mediterranean, and it is also located at the crossroads of southern Arabia, Mesopotamia, the Levant, and Egypt. Though Tayma was not directly one of the stopping points of the Frankincense Road, its constant water supply made it an attractive stopover point for travellers. Both written and archaeological evidence has shown that "the site maintained close economic, political and religious ties with all the regions of the Middle East before the Islamic era".

=== Bronze Age (3000–1200 BC) ===
The earliest evidence of sedentary human habitation in Tayma is from the early 4th millennium BC in the Bronze Age. Over the course of the 2nd millennium BC, Tayma was becoming more important: a substantial expansion of the settlement has been documented in the mid-2nd millennium BC, including the construction of a massive wall made of mudbrick and sandstone around it. By the end of the 2nd millennium BC, Tayma had become an economically important site, and was a member of a religious and political confederation. A key role in the emergence of Tayma as a key economic city in this period of time, facilitating a role for it in the place of international trade, was the domestication of the dromedary (Camelus dromedarius). Many weapons from the Levant dating to this time have been found at the site, highlighting the impact that trade relations had on the local material culture of Tayma.

=== Iron Age (1200–500 BC) ===
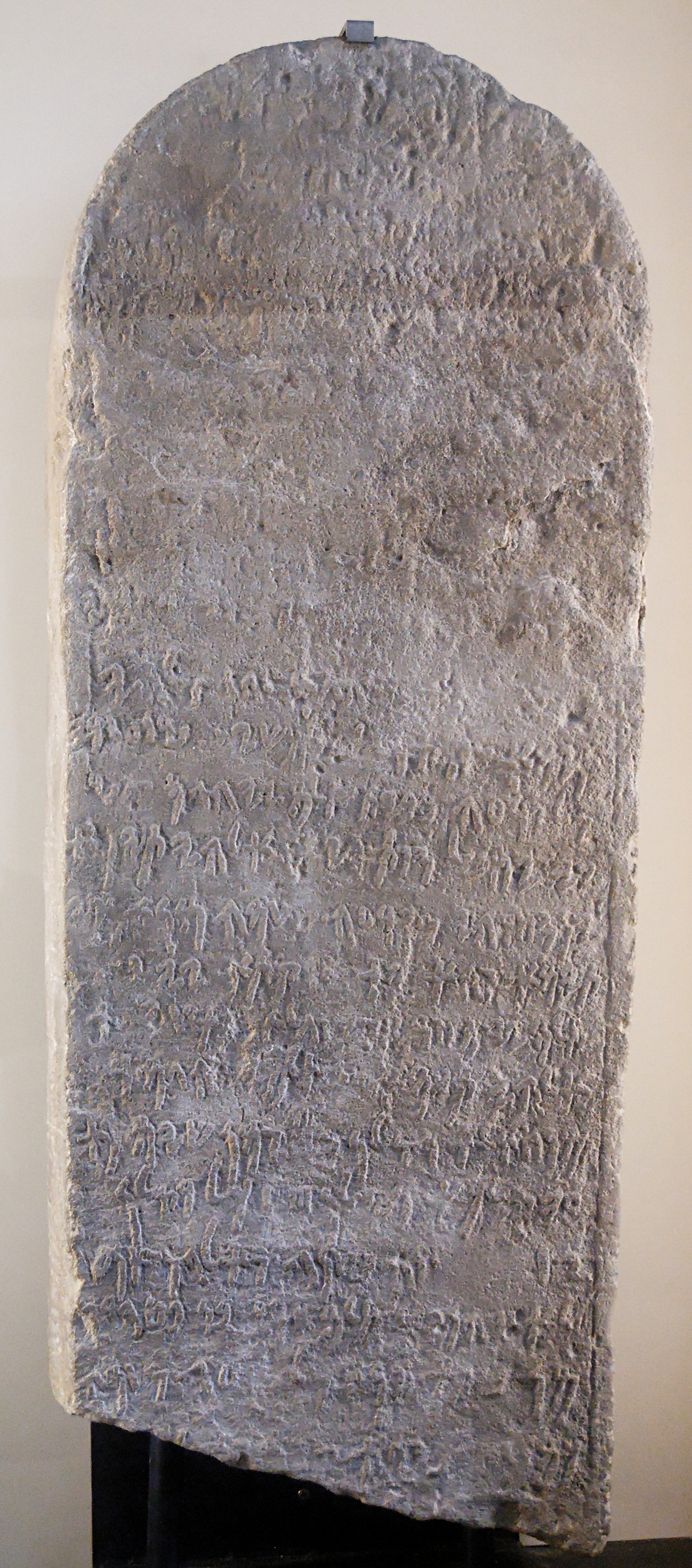
Aramaic inscription from Tayma Known as the Tayma Stones. (6th century BC.)

==== Under Egyptian hegemony ====
In the beginning of the Iron Age, the inhabitants of Tayma began to build monumental architecture, much of it related to the hegemony of nearby Egypt during the Ramesside Period. For example, in 2010, the Pharaonic Tayma inscription was discovered, the first hieroglyphic inscription found on Saudi soil, commissioned by Ramesses III (r. 1186–1155 BC) located about 60 kilometers northwest of Tayma. It reads:

The King of Upper and Lower Egypt, Lord of the Two Lands, User-Maat-Ra, beloved of Amun / The Son of Ra, Lord of Crowns, Ramesses, ruler of Heliopolis / Beloved of the Great Ruler of All Lands.

This inscription is similar to other Egyptian hieroglyphs in the Central Sinai and Southern Negev, and it confirms the presence of a royal Egyptian expedition in northwest Arabia, but little is known about the nature of the Egyptian presence that made it. Another discovery was of a rectangular building filled with Egyptian votive figurines, vessel fragments, and human-headed faience scarabs. Egyptian interests in Arabia may have been related to mining opportunities, similar to their interest in the Timna Valley of Palestine. After these opportunities dried out by the end of the Early Iron Age (12th–9th centuries BC), monumental architecture disappears from Tayma.

==== Mesopotamian hegemony ====
The earliest mentions of Tayma by name is in Near Eastern, especially Mesopotamian, sources in the eighth century BC (coinciding with the rise of the incense trade) which Tayma had close economic ties with. The earliest direct reference is in an Anatolian hieroglyph from c. 800 BC, where a king named Yariri boasts about his knowledge of twelve languages and four scripts, one of these being Taymanitic (the local writing system of Tayma).

Beginning in the 8th century BC, Tayma, and the surrounding region, was under the control of the Assyrian Empire, albeit without a formal annexation of Tayma into Assyrian territory. The main reason for the appearance of Tayma in the first inscriptions that mention it, is to declare successful raids on large trading caravans affiliated with Tayma: Ninurta-kudurri-usur, the "Governor of Suhu and Mari", captured large numbers of prisoners and spoils from a Tayma-affiliated caravan as punishment for them not paying a tax, and this was repeated in the time of Tiglath-Pileser III (744–727 BC). Between the ninth and seventh centuries BC, Assyrian inscriptions mention combat against coalitions of "Arabs" in Syria rising up against them; broader Arab-Assyrian relations and the place of Tayma in these wider trends have yet to be clarified by historians. An inscription has been found on the gates of the Assyrian capital Nineveh from the time of Sennacherib (705–681 BC), which says "The gifts of the people of Sumu’il and Tema enter here", underscoring a continued economical relationship through this time period.

In the early sixth century BC, the Babylonian Empire overthrew the Assyrians. Nabonidus (556–539 BC), the empire's last emperor, waged military campaigns against northwestern Arabia, and he used Tayma as his operating base for launching these attacks. These activities are mentioned not only in the inscriptions of Nabonidus, but also from cuneiform and Taymanitic inscriptions unearthed in and around Tayma, which name Nabonidus as the "king of Babylon". Tayma continued to be within the sphere of a great nearby empire in the Achaemenid era, the time period when the Tayma stones were created.

==== Lihyanite hegemony ====
After the fall of the Achaemenid empire, Tayma declined. The fall of Tayma's significance happened in conjunction with the rise of the Lihyanite dynasty of Dedan. Inscriptions show that it entered into a series of wars with Dedan, Massah, and Nabaya, and around this point in time, Tayma fell under Dedan's hegemony. The actual site of Tayma experienced a major contraction in its size. Several Taymanitic inscriptions mention the Dedanite king Tulmay and several statues have been found in one of the temples of Tayma from this time that are identical to those known from Dedan.

==== Biblical references ====
Tayma is mentioned several times in the Hebrew Bible (Genesis 25:15, Job 6:19, Isaiah 21:14, Jeremiah 25:23, 1 Chronicles 1:30). The biblical eponym is Tema, one of the sons of Ishmael, after whom the Land of Tema is named. It was one of the rich cities against which Jeremiah prophesied (Jer 25:23). In the Book of Job (6:19) it is known as a commercial city.

=== Classical and late antiquity ===
In the Hellenistic period, Tayma becomes a focal point of more regional power-players, compared to the empires of the Iron Age: first for Lihyan, and then the Nabataean Kingdom. Despite the Roman annexation of Nabataea in 106 AD, Tayma is not mentioned by Roman sources.

Arabic tradition describes Tayma as the place of a Jewish population in late antiquity. An inscription from Tayma mentions a man with a Jewish name as the governor of the city in the 3rd century AD. In pre-Islamic Arabic poetry, Tayma is famously associated with the life and exploits of the Jewish poet Samaw'al ibn 'Adiya. The earliest reference to Tayma in the Arabic language is thought to be in the poetry of Imru' al-Qais. Pre-Islamic poetry often refers to Tayma as a fortified city belonging to the Jews (as an anonymous Arab poet wrote: "Unto God will I make my complaint heard, but not unto man; because I am a sojourner in Taymā, Taymā of the Jews!"). According to Islamic tradition, the Jewish population of Tayma was exiled during the reign of the caliph Umar.

=== Islamic era ===
The importance of Tayma for trade was its defining characteristic in the Arabic tradition that talks about it. According to these texts:

Tayma was a four-day journey from Dumat al-Jandal. Al-Muqaddasi mentions a journey of three days between Tayma and al-Hijr/Hegra and four days between Tayma and Tabuk. According to Ibn Hawqal, in the 4th century of the Hegira the city had a larger population than Tabuk and was an important trading place for the Bedouins in the area. By the 5th century of the Islamic era, the prosperity and importance of Tayma had become a constant in the tradition. Al-Muqaddasi mentions its water supply coming from a spring and several wells, as well as lush palm groves yielding excellent dates. The site’s prosperity was also described a little later by al-Bakri, who mentions the city walls. Still visible today, they give the ruin its characteristic profile. The walls were also mentioned by Yaqut as possible vestiges of Qasr al-Ablaq. In later years, the Tayma oasis became a rest stop on the pilgrimage route between Syria and the holy cities.

Tayma and neighboring Khaybar were visited by Benjamin of Tudela sometime around 1170. He claimed that the city was governed by a Jewish prince. Benjamin was a Jew from al-Andalus who travelled to Persia and Arabia in the 12th century.

In the summer of 1181, Raynald of Châtillon, Prince of Antioch and Lord of Oultrejordain, attacked a Muslim caravan near Tayma during a raid of the Red Sea area despite a truce between Saladin and Baldwin IV of Jerusalem.

== Climate ==
Tayma has a hot desert climate (Köppen climate classification BWh), with most of its rainfall occurring during the winter months. The average annual temperature is 21.8 °C (71.2 °F), and the city receives approximately 65 mm (2.56 in) of precipitation per year.

Climate data for Tayma
Month	Jan	Feb	Mar	Apr	May	Jun	Jul	Aug	Sep	Oct	Nov	Dec	Year
Mean daily maximum °C (°F)	17.7 (63.9)	21.1 (70.0)	24.2 (75.6)	29.4 (84.9)	32.8 (91.0)	36.1 (97.0)	36.9 (98.4)	37.1 (98.8)	35.8 (96.4)	31.5 (88.7)	24.2 (75.6)	18.9 (66.0)	28.8 (83.9)
Mean daily minimum °C (°F)	4.5 (40.1)	6.9 (44.4)	9.8 (49.6)	14.5 (58.1)	18.9 (66.0)	22.2 (72.0)	23.3 (73.9)	23.3 (73.9)	20.9 (69.6)	16.5 (61.7)	10.7 (51.3)	5.8 (42.4)	14.8 (58.6)
Average precipitation mm (inches)	9 (0.4)	4 (0.2)	10 (0.4)	9 (0.4)	3 (0.1)	0 (0)	0 (0)	0 (0)	0 (0)	7 (0.3)	16 (0.6)	7 (0.3)	65 (2.6)
Source: Climate data

== Archaeology ==
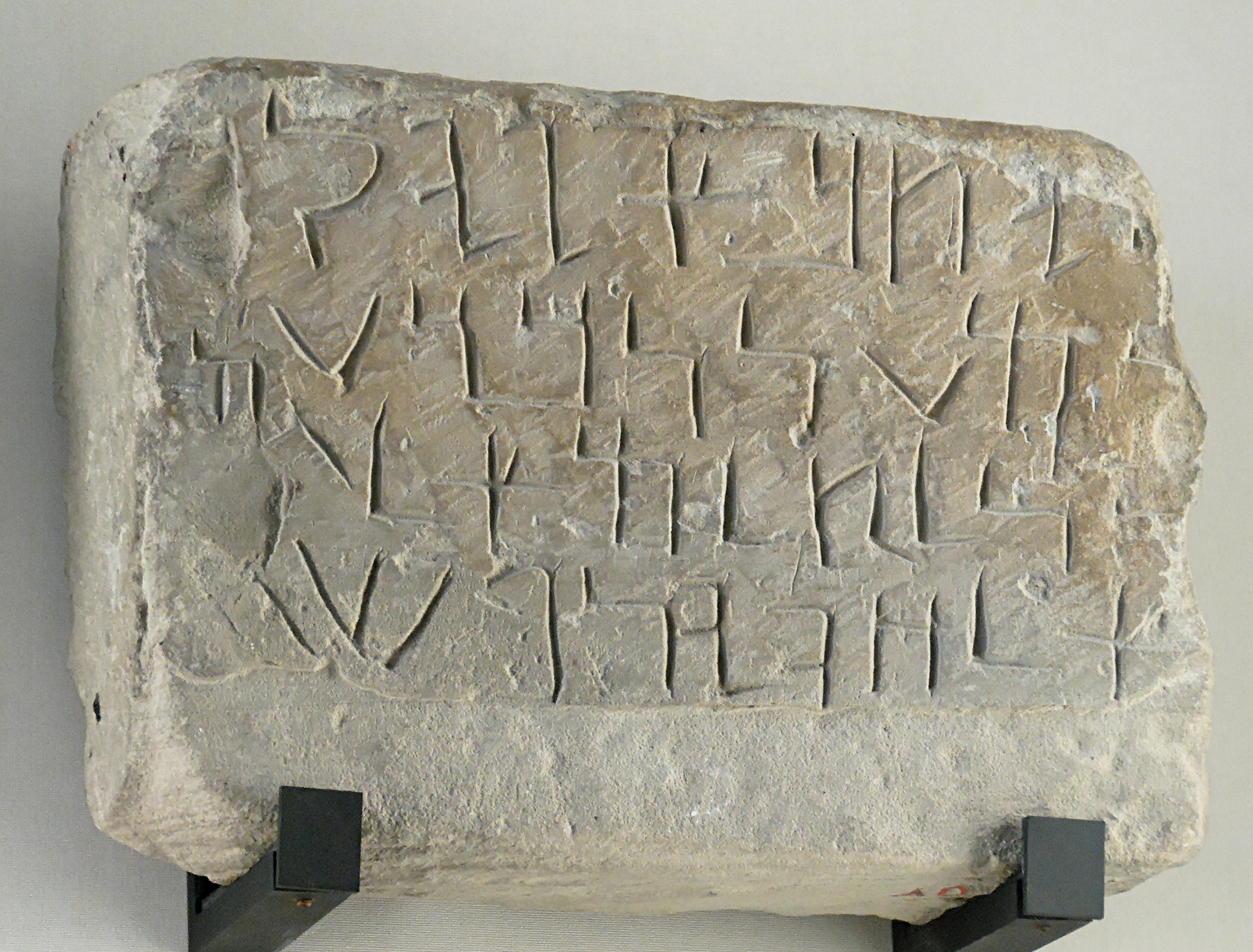
Stele with dedicatory Aramaic inscription to the god Salm. Sandstone, 5th century BC. Found in Tayma by Charles Huber in 1884. Now in the Louvre.

The site was first investigated and mapped by Charles M. Doughty in 1877.

The Tayma stele discovered by Charles Huber in 1883, now at the Louvre, lists the gods of Tayma in the 6th century BC: Ṣalm of Maḥram and Shingala-and-Ashira. This Ashira may be "incorrect" for the name Ashima, according to Miller, who also renders Śengallā.

Archeological investigation of the site, under the auspices of the German Archaeological Institute, is ongoing.

=== The Tayma stones ===
Clay tablets and stone inscriptions using Taymanitic script and language were found in ruins and around the oasis. Nearby Tayma was a Sabaean trading station, where Sabaean language inscriptions were found.

== Economy ==
Historically, Tayma is known for growing dates. The oasis also produced rock salt, which was distributed throughout Arabia. Tayma also mined alum, which was processed and used for the care of camels.

== Points of interest ==
- Qasr Al-Ablaq (قصر الأبلق) is a qasr located on the southwest side of the city. It was built by the Arab Jewish poet and warrior Samaw'al ibn 'Adiya and his grandfather 'Adiya in the 6th century.
- Qasr Al-Hamra (قصر الحمراء), a palace was built in the 7th century BC.
- Tayma has an archaeologically significant perimeter wall built around three sides of the old city in the 6th century BC.
- Qasr Al-Radhm (قصر الرضم)
- Haddaj Well (بئر هداج)
- Cemeteries
- Many Aramaic, Lihyanite, Thamudic, and Nabataean inscriptions
- Qasr Al-Bejaidi (قصر البجيدي)
- Al-Hadiqah Mound
- Al-Naslaa rock formation
- Many museums. Although Tayma has museums of its own such as the "Tayma Museum of Archaeology and Ethnography", many artifacts from its history have been spread to other museums. Early finds such as the "Tayma Stele" are at the Louvre in Paris among others while large museums of national importance in Saudi Arabia, such as the National Museum of Saudi Arabia in Riyadh and the Jeddah Regional Museum of Archaeology and Ethnography also have significant collections of items from or related to ancient Tayma.

== Population ==
Historical population
Year	Pop.	±% p.a.
2010	36,666	—
2022	42,164	+1.17%

== See also ==
- Land of Tema
- Tayma stones
- Provinces of Saudi Arabia
- List of governorates of Saudi Arabia
- List of cities of the ancient Near East
- List of cities and towns in Saudi Arabia
- List of World Heritage Sites in Saudi Arabia

== Sources ==
- Hausleiter, Arnulf (2010). "The Oasis of Tayma". In Al-Ghabban, Ali Ibrahim; Andre-Salvini, Beatrice; Demange, Francoise; Juvin, Carine; Cotty, Marianne (eds.). Roads of Arabia: Archaeology and History of the Kingdom of Saudi Arabia. Somogy Art Publishing. pp. 219–261.
- Kootstra, Fokelien (2016). "The Language of the Taymanitic Inscriptions & its classification". Arabian Epigraphic Notes. 2: 67–140.
- Prothero, G.W. (1920). Arabia. London: H.M. Stationery Office. p. 83.
- Tebes, Juan Manual (2023). "The Southern Levant and Northern Arabia in the Iron Age". In Radner, Karen; Moeller, Nadine; Potts, D. T. (eds.). The Oxford History of the Ancient Near East: The Age of Persia. Vol. 5. Oxford University Press. pp. 299–375. ISBN 978-0-19-068766-3.
