= Charles Montagu Doughty =

British poet, writer, explorer, adventurer & traveller (1843-1926)

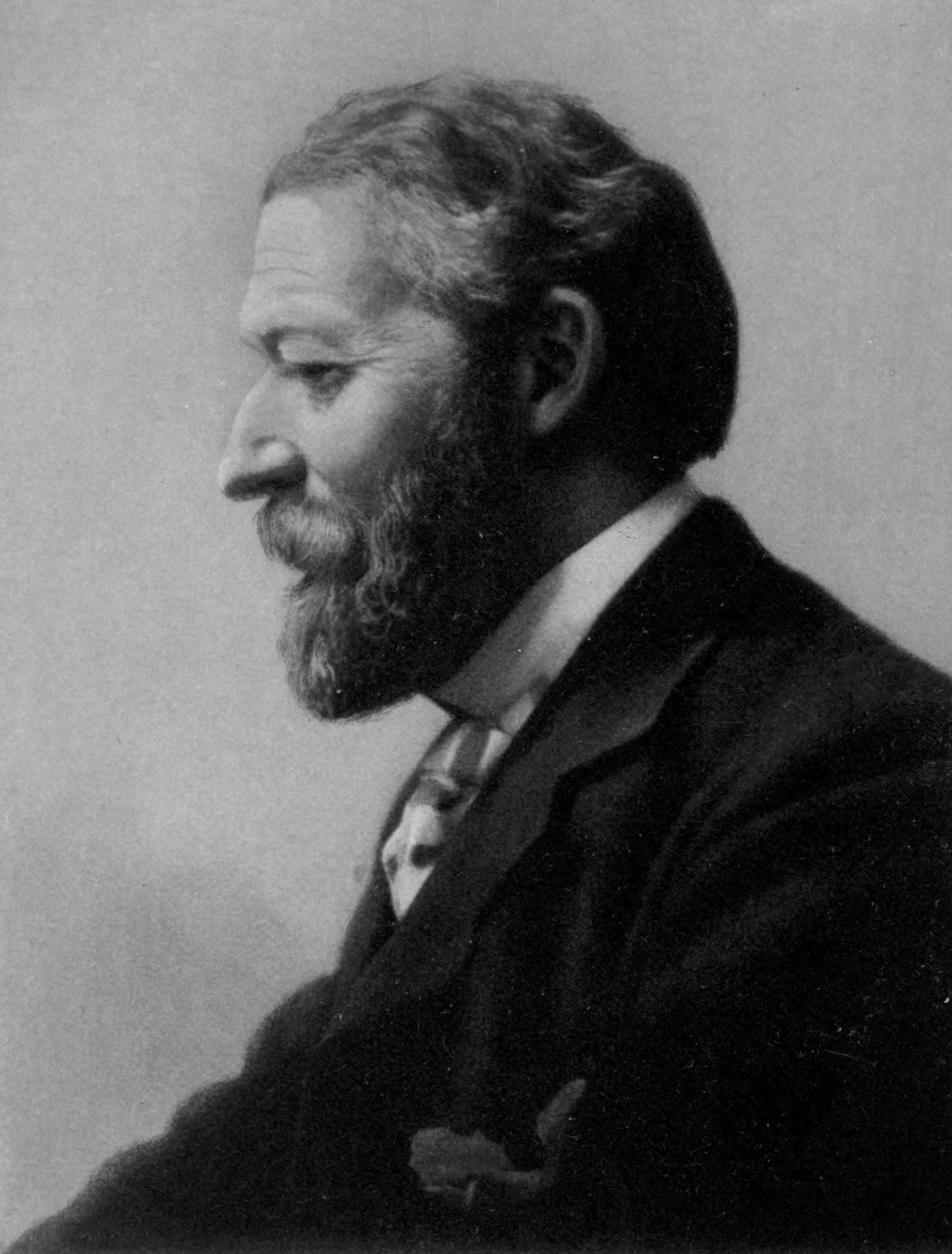
- Born: August 19, 1843; Theberton, Suffolk, England
- Died: January 20, 1926 (aged 82); Eastbourne, England
- Resting place: Golders Green Crematorium
- Education: Gonville and Caius College, Cambridge; Downing College, Cambridge
- Occupations: Poet, writer, explorer, traveller
- Writing career
- Genres: Travel literature, poetry
- Notable awards: Founder's Medal (1912)

Charles Montagu Doughty (19 August 1843 – 20 January 1926) was a British poet, writer, explorer, adventurer and traveller, best known for his two-volume 1888 travel book Travels in Arabia Deserta.

== Early life and education ==
Son of Rev. Charles Montagu Doughty, of Theberton Hall near Saxmundham, Suffolk, and Frederica Beaumont Hotham, daughter of Rev. the Hon. Frederick Hotham, of Dennington, Suffolk (son of the judge and politician Beaumont Hotham, 2nd Baron Hotham), Doughty was born at Theberton Hall and educated at private schools in Laleham and Elstree and at a school for the Royal Navy, Portsmouth. He was a student at King's College School, Wimbledon, and went up to Gonville and Caius College, Cambridge, migrating to Downing College, Cambridge, from which he took a BA in 1866, then taking an MA from Caius in 1869.

== Career ==
Doughty is best known for his 1888 travel book Travels in Arabia Deserta, a work in two volumes that, although it had little immediate influence upon its publication, slowly became a kind of touchstone of ambitious travel writing, one valued as much for its language as for its content. T. E. Lawrence rediscovered the book and caused it to be republished in the 1920s, contributing an admiring introduction of his own. Since then, the book has gone in and out of print. The book is a vast recounting of Doughty's treks through the Arabian deserts, and his discoveries there. It is written in an extravagant and mannered style that has been compared to the King James Bible, but whose mixture of Elizabethanisms and Victorianisms received some criticism. Among authors who have praised the book are the British novelist Henry Green, whose essay on Doughty, "Apologia," is reprinted in his collection Surviving. Green's novels arguably show some direct stylistic influence of Doughty's book, as noted by John Updike in his introduction to the collection of Green's novels Loving; Living; Party Going.

Doughty's epic poem The Dawn in Britain was originally published in 1906 in six volumes. It provides a preparatory basis and ideal for Laura (Riding) Jackson and Schuyler B. Jackson's project of establishing an access to what they argue is an inherent meaning of words in their Rational Meaning: a New Foundation for the Definition of Words and Supplementary Essays. The Jacksons hail Doughty's work as being exemplary of this access to meaning through the linguistic understanding he demonstrates in his diction, in the care he takes with his choice of words, which prefers pre-Shakespearean English for reasons "fundamentally linguistic, rather than literary." Whole sections of the Jacksons' book examine Doughty's linguistic care and thinking.

He was awarded the 1912 Royal Geographical Society's Founder's Medal for his travels and writings.

Edward Said characterizes Doughty as significant to the development of late 19th-century Orientalist style. Placing him in a category of Orientalism alongside T. E. Lawrence, Gertrude Bell, David George Hogarth, St John Philby, Mark Sykes, and Sir Ronald Storrs, Said writes: "Each ... believed his vision of things Oriental was individual, self-created out of some intensely personal encounter with the Orient, Islam, or the Arabs; each expressed general contempt for official knowledge held about the East."

== Personal life ==
In 1886, Doughty married Caroline Amelia, daughter of General Sir William Montagu Scott McMurdo. They were parents of Dorothy Susan (1892–1962) and Frederica ("Freda") Gertrude Doughty (1895–1972), sculptors and potters. Doughty was uncle of Lieutenant-Colonel Charles Doughty-Wylie, VC, CB, CMG and his younger brother, the Naval Rear Admiral Henry Montagu Doughty, CB.

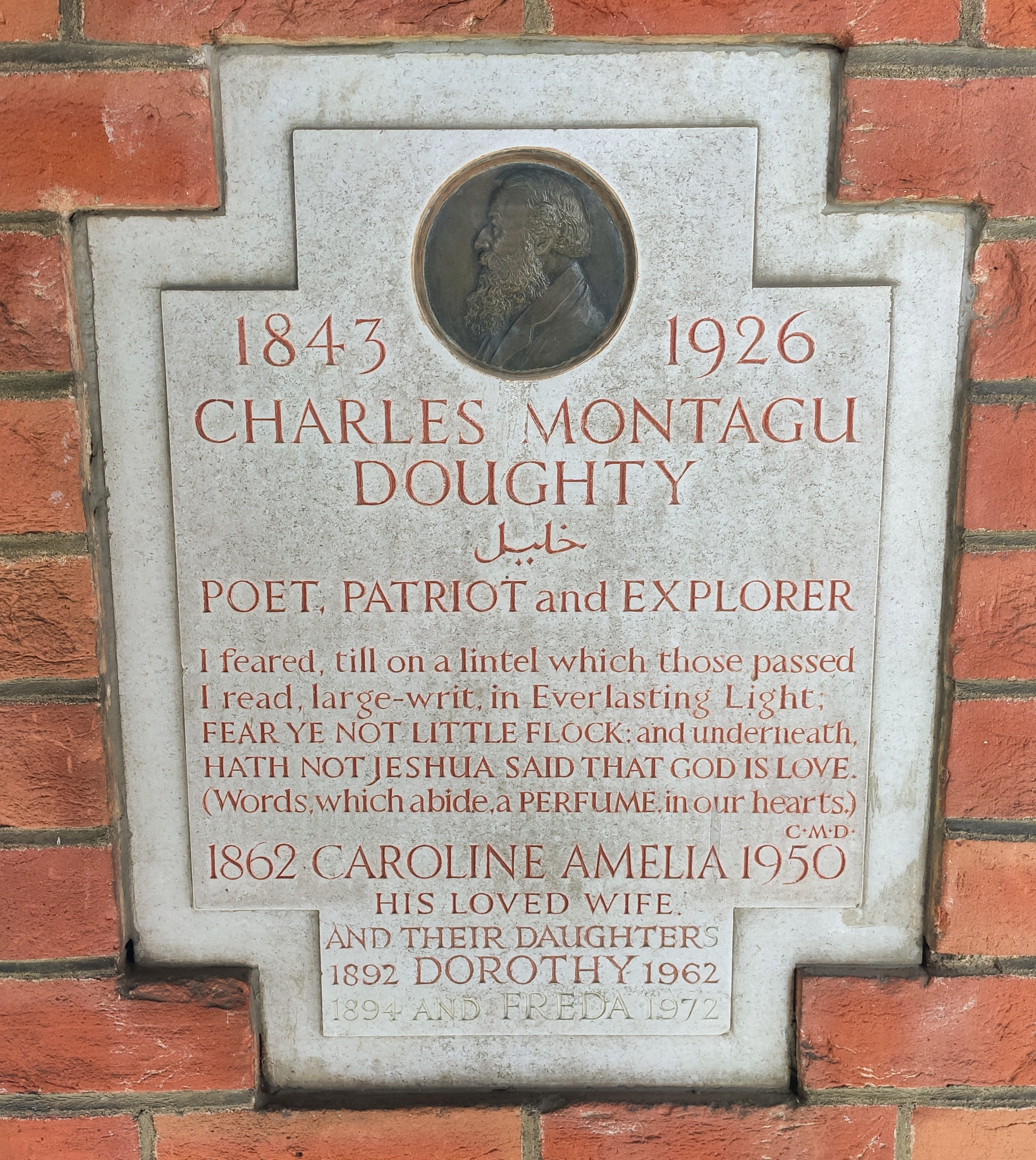
Plaque dedicated to Charles Montagu Doughty at Golders Green Crematorium

Doughty was cremated at Golders Green Crematorium on 25 January 1926 and his ashes placed in Bay 1 of the Cloisters (tablet 2610).

== Works ==
- Documents Épigraphiques Recueillis dans le Nord de l’Arabie (1884)
- Travels in Arabia Deserta (1888)
- The Dawn in Britain (1906)
- Adam Cast Forth (1908)
- The Cliffs (1909)
- The Clouds (1912)
- The Titans (1916)
- Mansoul; or, The Riddle of the World (1920)

== References and further reading ==
- Cousin, John W. A Short Biographical Dictionary of English Literature, 1910.
- Taylor, Andrew (1999). God's Fugitive: The Life of Charles Montagu Doughty. London: HarperCollins. ISBN 978-0-00-255815-0.
- Hogarth, D. G. The Life of Charles M. Doughty, 1928.
- Kirk, John Foster. A Supplement to Allibone's Critical Dictionary of English Literature and British and American Authors, 1891.
- Wanderings in Arabia, arranged & introduced by Edward Garnett. Duckworth & Co, 1908.
- Passages from Arabia Deserta, selected by Edward Garnett. Jonathan Cape, 1931.
- "Mr. C. M. Doughty". Nature 117: 204 (1926).
