= Cannock Chase German Military Cemetery =

Military cemetery in Cannock Chase, England

- Commonwealth War Graves Commission for the German War Graves Commission (Volksbund Deutsche Kriegsgräberfürsorge)
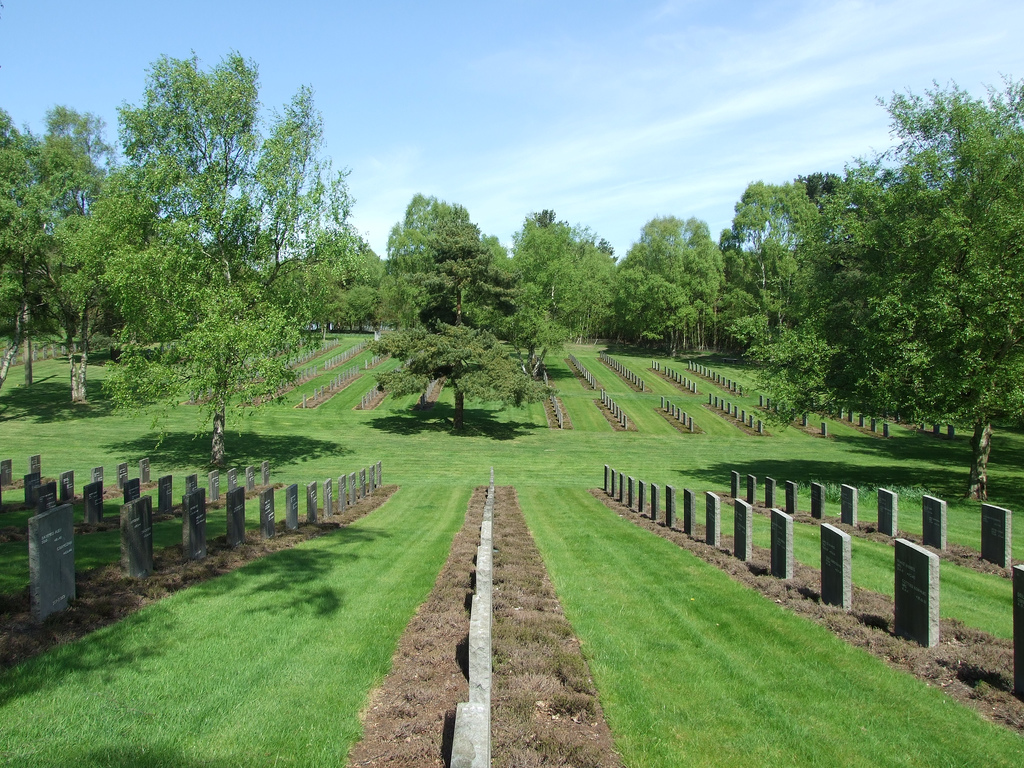
- Used for those deceased 1914–18 and 1939–45
- Established: 1956 (consecration cemetery)
- Location: 52.7398°N 2.0224°W near Cannock, Staffordshire, England
- Designed by: Diez Brandi, Göttingen, Germany; Harold Doffman & Peter Leach, Stafford, England
- Total burials: 4,929
- Unknowns: 5 (World War I); 90 (World War II)

Burials by nation
- German Empire (World War I); Nazi Germany (World War II)

Burials by war
- 2,143 (World War I); 2,786 (World War II)
- Statistics source: See references

The Cannock Chase German Military Cemetery (grid reference SJ984157) is on Cannock Chase, Staffordshire, England. The cemetery contains nearly 5,000 burials from both the First and Second World War. The burials are mainly German and Austrian nationals with a very small number of Ukrainians.

== History ==
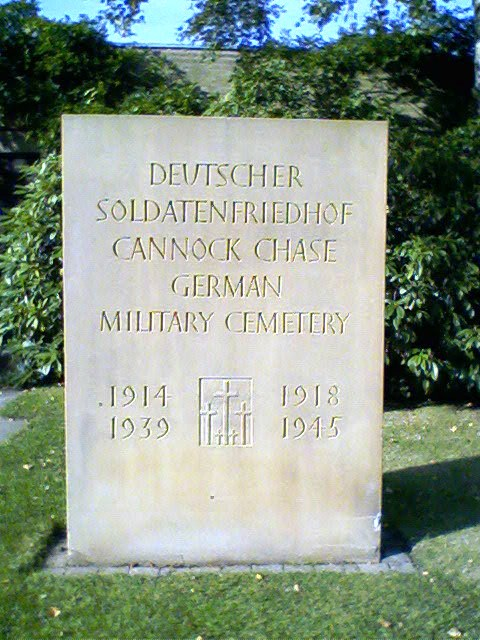
Carved plinth at cemetery entrance, 2009

It is estimated that some 7,200 Germans, both military and civilian, died in Great Britain during the two world wars. On 16 October 1959, the governments of the United Kingdom and the Federal Republic of Germany made an agreement about the future care of the remains of German military personnel and German civilian internees of both world wars which at the time were interred in various cemeteries not already maintained by the Commonwealth War Graves Commission. It was agreed that the remains would be transferred to a single central cemetery established on Cannock Chase for this purpose.

The German War Graves Commission (Volksbund Deutsche Kriegsgräberfürsorge or "VDK") made the necessary arrangements and the inauguration and dedication of this cemetery – which is maintained under the inter-government agreement by the Commonwealth War Graves Commission – was inaugurated and dedicated in June 1967. It contains a total of 4,747 graves. The deceased are mostly German and Austrian, and a number of World War II Ukrainian volunteers, captured when in German service, are also buried here.

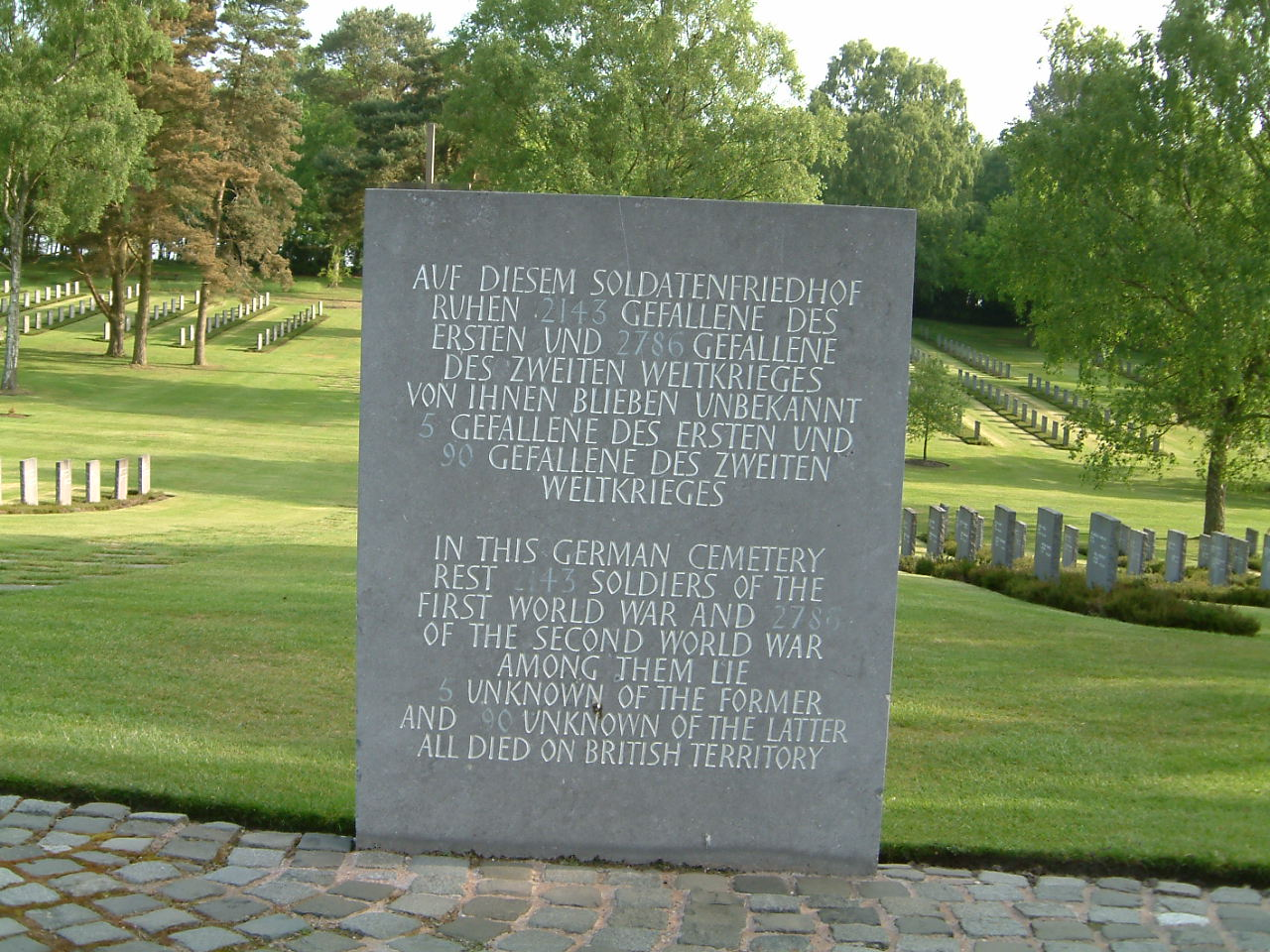
Cannock Chase German Military Cemetery – Burial details June 2015

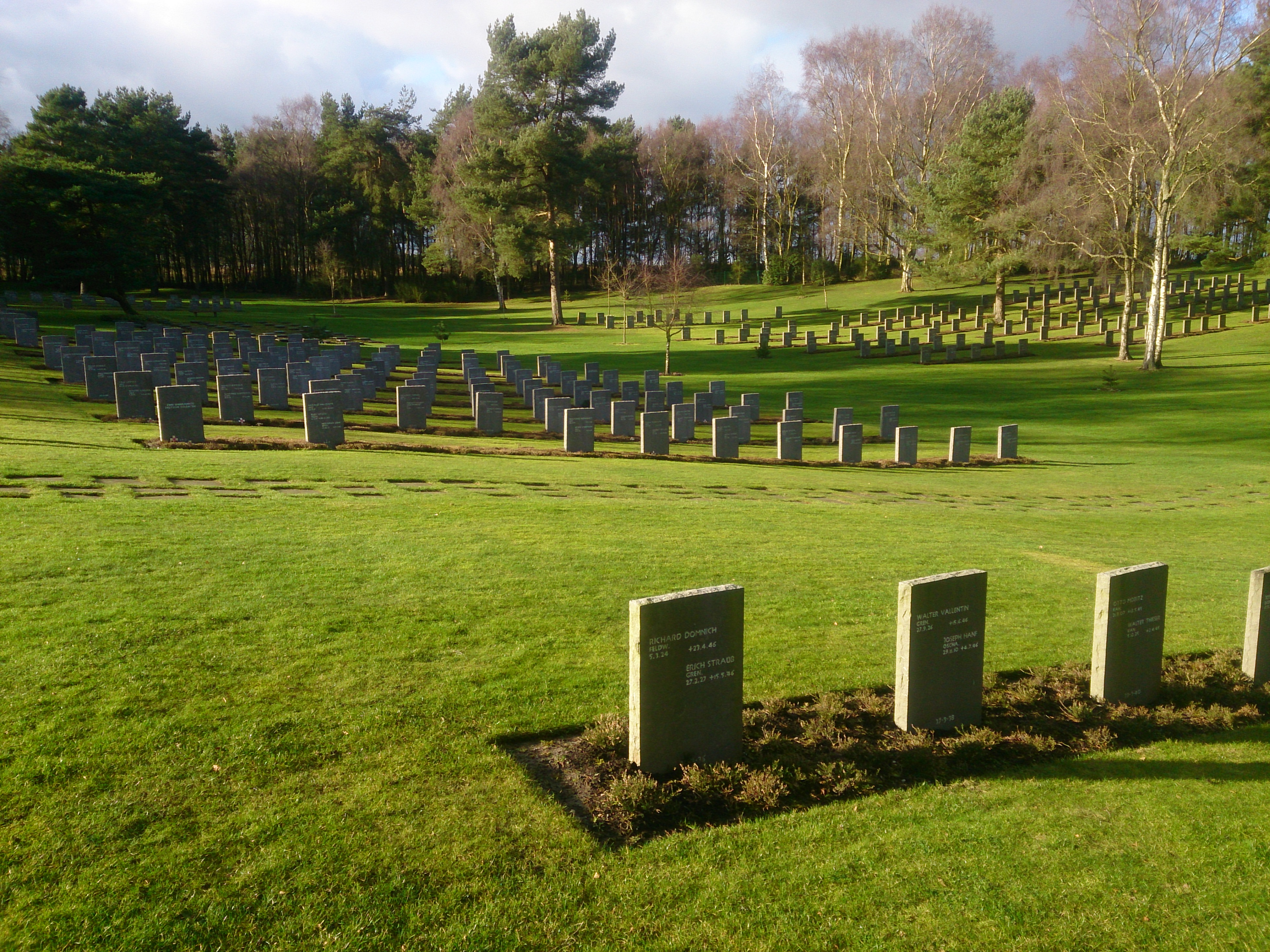
A view across Cannock Chase German Military Cemetery

== Layout of the cemetery ==
The entrance building contains toilets for visitors and a visiting room where the cemetery register is available on request. A plan of the plots within the cemetery is also on display. From here a small courtyard with a covered passage forms the connection to the Hall of Honour, which has at its centre, resting on a large block of stone, a bronze sculpture of a fallen warrior, by the eminent German sculptor, Professor Hans Wimmer. Open passageways give a clear view of two terraces. On the west-facing terrace there is a granite monument to the crews of the four airships (SL 11, L32, L31, L48) shot down in World War I and who lie buried here in a tomb in separate sarcophagi.

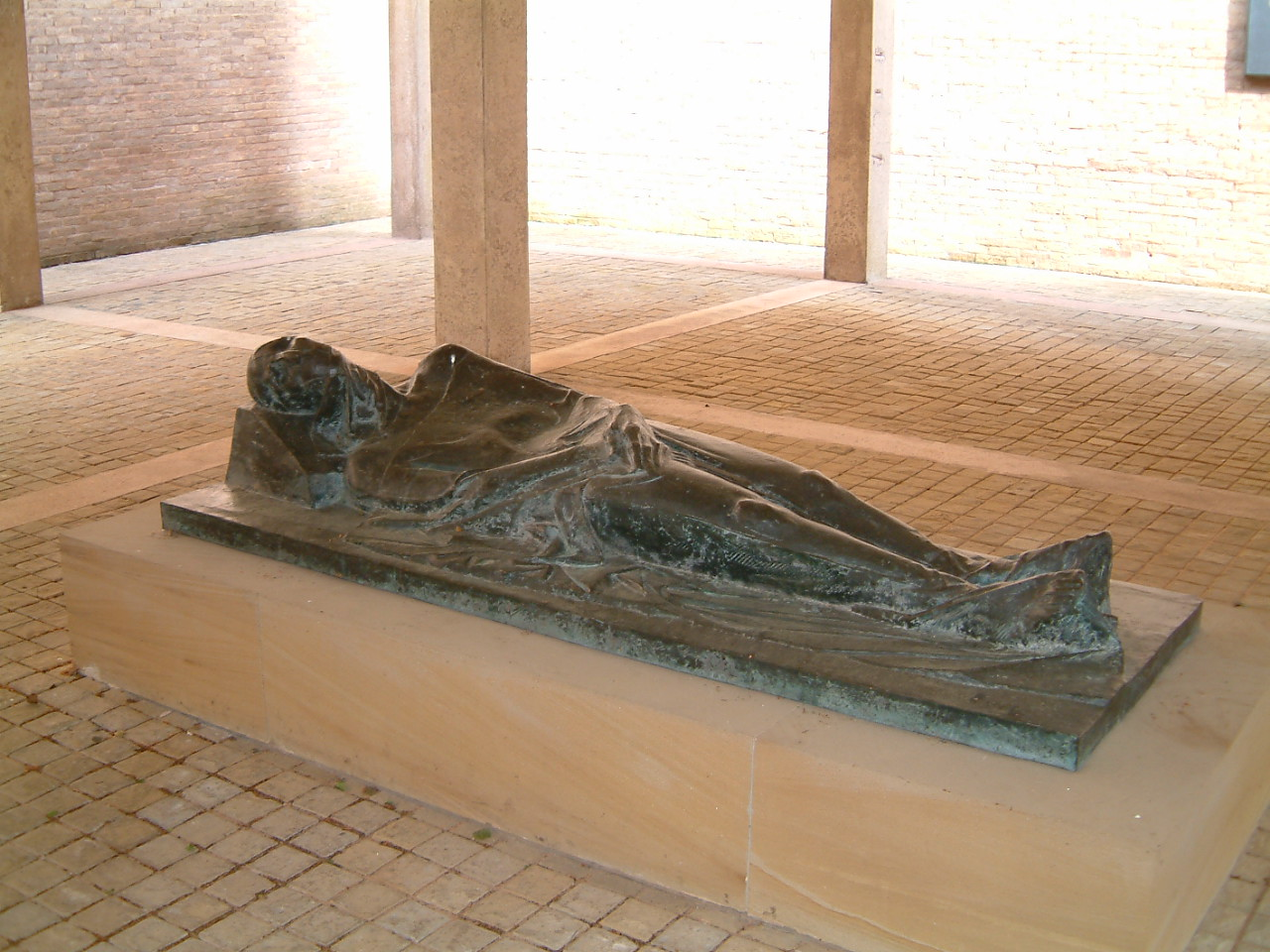
Cannock Chase German Military Cemetery – Fallen Soldier by Hans Wimmer

The other terrace forms a link between the Hall of Honour and the cemetery. The graves of the dead of the First and Second World War are generally separated and lie on either side of the gentle slopes of the cemetery with a valley between them. The burials are marked by headstones from Belgian Petit Granit and are usually inscribed for two individuals on the front and on the back.

== Notable graves ==
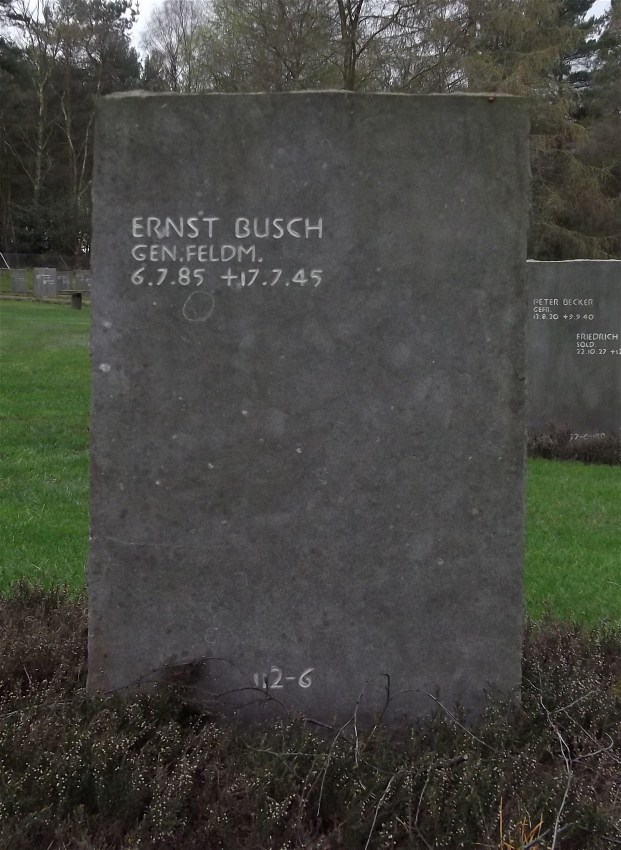
GFM Ernst Busch's grave at Cannock Chase German Military Cemetery

Notable people include:

- Ernst Busch, World War II German Field-Marshal and Pour le Mérite (Blue Max) recipient.
- Leo Gburek, German geophysicist, Luftwaffe Weather Observer and a member of the Third German Antarctic Expedition
- Hans Hahn, World War II German Luftwaffe flying ace.
- Maximilian von Herff, World War II German SS-General.
- Heinrich Mathy, World War I German Zeppelin commander, killed in 1916.
- Karl Ritscherle, World War I German flying ace and World War II Luftwaffe major, killed during the Battle of Britain.
- Alois Stoeckl, World War II German Luftwaffe Oberst, killed during the Battle of Britain.

== German war graves elsewhere in UK ==
According to the Volksbund Deutsche Kriegsgräberfürsorge, just over 1,000 German World War II casualties are buried elsewhere in the UK (and Islands), including 111 at Saint Peter Port (Fort George), Guernsey, and others at Brookwood Cemetery, Surrey. The remainder are interred in Commonwealth War Graves Commission-administered plots all over the UK, often near where their bodies were found or where they died. For example, three Luftwaffe bomber crew, whose Dornier ditched in the sea off Kingsdown, Kent in 1940, were buried in the military section of Hamilton Road Cemetery, Deal, Kent, less than two miles from the crash.

In the same locality as this cemetery, the Commonwealth Cannock Chase War Cemetery contains 286 German war graves, primarily of those who died in a local prisoner-of-war camp and hospital in World War I but also including graves of 58 Germans who had been reinterred here in 1963.

A proposal was made to rebury in this cemetery former Imperial German Navy officer Carl Hans Lody (shot for espionage at the Tower of London in 1914) in the 1960s. The VDK asked if it would be possible to disinter Lody's body from East London Cemetery in Plaistow and move it to Cannock Chase. By that time, the plot had been reused for further common graves, buried above Lody's body. The VDK was told that it would not be possible to disinter the other bodies without the permission of the relatives, which would have been an almost impossible task where common graves were concerned. The proposal was abandoned and Lody's body remains at Plaistow.

== See also ==
- Listed buildings in Brocton, Staffordshire
