= Travels in Arabia Deserta =

1888 travel book by Charles Montagu Doughty

- Title page for Travels in Arabia Deserta (1930 edition)
- Author: Charles Montagu Doughty
- Language: English
- Genre: Travel book
- Publication date: 1888

Travels in Arabia Deserta (1888) is a travel book by Charles Montagu Doughty (1843–1926), an English poet, writer, and traveller. Doughty had travelled in the Middle East and spent some time living with the Bedouins during the 1870s. Rory Stewart describes the book as "a unique chronicle of a piece of history that has been lost".

An abridged version was arranged and introduced in 1908 by Edward Garnett, but the original version was reissued with a new introduction by Doughty and an introduction by T. E. Lawrence in 1921. Lawrence was an avid admirer of Doughty and his writing, as shown in his introduction. Lawrence had been instrumental in having the work reprinted, with his name ensuring that Arabia Deserta reached a wider audience.

== Sources ==
- Burton, Richard F. (28 July 1888). "Mr. Doughty's Travels in Arabia". The Academy. 34 (846): 47–8.
- Cousin, John W. A Short Dictionary of English Literature. 1910.
- Taylor, Andrew (1999). God's Fugitive: The Life of Charles Montagu Doughty. Hammersmith; London: HarperCollins Publishers. ISBN 0002558157.
- Hogarth, D.G. The Life Of Charles M. Doughty. 1928
- Wanderings In Arabia arranged & introduced by Edward Garnett. Duckworth & Co 1908.
- Passages From Arabia Deserta selected by Edward Garnett. Jonathan Cape 1931.
