= List of archaeology sites of Saudi Arabia =

Many sites in the archaeology of the Arabian Peninsula are found in Saudi Arabia, and many of these are in UNESCO's list of World Heritage Sites. Saudi Arabian archaeological sites include:

- Abu Loza's Bath
- Ain Qannas, archaeological site Al-Hasa, Eastern Saudi Arabia
- Al Naslaa, landform
- Al-'Ula, ancient Arabic oasis
- Al-Rabadha, archaeological excavations
- Al-Ukhaydir, Tabuk Province, archaeological site
- Ancient towns in Saudi Arabia
- Aynuna, excavations from the Roman period (1st century AD) to the early Islamic times (8th century)
- Bir Hima Rock Petroglyphs and Inscriptions
- Columns of Rajajil 6,000 years old pillars carved from sandstone
- Desert kites, stone wall structures
- Dhat al-Hajj, archaeological site in the Tabuk Province
- Dosariyah, archeological site in the Eastern Province
- Dumat al-Jandal, ancient city of ruins, Al Jawf Province
  - Dumat al-Jandal Wall
- Gerrha, candidate archaeological sites in Eastern Arabia
- Hegra, archaeological site in Medina Province
- Jabal al-Baidain, mountain known for drawings and Thamudic inscriptions
- Jabal al-ʿHayn, site of pre-historic petroglyphs, tribal markings (wusūm) and inscriptions
- Jubail Church, ancient building near Jubail, Eastern province
- Kilwa
- "Land of Tema", Biblical place linked to old city walls, Tayma
- Leuke Kome
- Marid Castle
- Old Town, Al-'Ula
- Qal'at al-Qatif
- Shanqal Fort
- Sisira Well, Al-Jawf region
- Tarout Island island inhabited since 5000 BC
  - Tarout Castle
- Tomb of Eve, archeological site, Jeddah
- Uqair salt mine Archaeological site
- Tayma
  - Pharaonic Tayma inscription, hieroglyphic petroglyph found near the oasis of Tayma,
  - Tayma stones, Aramaic inscriptions found in northern Saudi Arabia.

== Rock art in Saudi Arabia ==
- Al Naslaa
- Bir Hima Rock Petroglyphs and Inscriptions
- Camel Carving Site
- Hima Paleo-Arabic inscriptions

== See also ==
- Near Eastern bioarchaeology
- Prehistoric Arabia
