= Kilwa (Saudi Arabia) =

Archaeological site in Saudi Arabia

Kilwa (Arabic: كيلوة) is an Arabian archaeological site in the Tabuk Province of Saudi Arabia, located 272 km northwest of the city of Tabuk, at the King Salman Reserve. The region was formerly part of the nation Jordan, but a 1965 exchange agreement made it Saudi territory.

Kilwa is known for its rock art, animal drawings (petroglyphs), and stone artifacts. The rock engravings depict animals like ibex and cattle, as well as human figures and geometric patterns. The remains date across prehistoric, Stone Age, Neolithic, pre-Islamic and Islamic periods.

Kilwa is also known for housing a population of pre-Islamic Arabian Christians: remains of a monastery, church, chapel, and engraved crosses and Christian inscriptions have all been documented at the archaeological site. The presence of a community like this, in the arid desert, indicates that some nomadic Arab tribes had converted to Christianity by that time. The monastery could have belonged to the episcopate of the Ghassanid bishop Theodore. The Christian community of Kilwa likely survived in early Islamic times. The site was also known to the Arab geographer al-Maqdisi in the 10th century.

== Name ==
A Christian Arabic inscription at Kilwa may refer to the ahl Kallā, translated "People of the Cells", referring to the monastic cells that would be inhabited, at a monastery, by monks. Robert Hoyland suggests the community's self-description as the ahl Kallā could credibly explain the modern site-name, Kilwa.

== Christian community ==
One of the notable historical findings at the Kilwa archaeological sites is the discovery of a phase of Christian living. A monastery, church, chapel, and engraved crosses and Christian inscriptions have been documented at the site. This is the closest discovered Christian occupation to Western Arabia. The exact date of the monastery itself has not been established yet, but may range from late pre-Islamic to early Islamic times, most likely the seventh to eighth centuries. This has been supported by radiocarbon dating.

A Christian Arabic inscription found at the monastery reads:

† In the name of God, the people of Kallā / Taklā, from (the church / province of …?), engraved / encircled it (Robert Hoyland translation)

The inscription begins with an inscribed Maltese cross, confirming the Christian identity of its author, followed by a partial Basmala. The Basmala is not unusual, for at this time, both Christian and Muslims would have used it, and the Basmala may have pre-Islamic origins, shown by the Jabal Dabub inscription and other evidence.

The next part of the inscription is difficult to read. According to Robert Hoyland, there are one of two possibilities: Ahl Kallā or Ahl Taklā, that is, the "People of Kallā" or the "People of Taklā". If the first reading is correct, which Hoyland overall prefers, the word kallā is likely connected to the Greek kella and Latin cella, used to refer to the cells inhabited by monks at monasteries. According to Hoyland, this reading is supported by the monastic context of the finding of the inscription. If the second reading is correct, the correct reading would be, the "People of Thecla", a reference to the Christian saint popular in Late Antiquity, Thecla, an ascetic that lived in monastic cells in Syrian mountains.

The "forbidden place" (Ḥimat) is a term described in the medieval Arabic dictionary Lisan al-Arab; accordingly, it describes a protected area meant for farming, or for grazing camels, or for collecting rain.

== Geography and description ==
The archaeological remains lie within a broad upland plain shaped by surrounding low relief. To the northeast, scattered limestone outcrops and eroded sandstone hills rise modestly above the plain, forming a discontinuous boundary around the site. The eastern perimeter is defined only intermittently by narrow ridges, while the southern margin is bordered by gently inclined hills aligned on a southeast–northwest axis. At the southern extremity of the site lies the al Qāʿ depression, a natural basin that collects seasonal runoff from wadis draining the surrounding highlands to the northwest.

Kilwa comprises a compact settlement, densest in its western sector, with building remains arranged in east-facing clusters of rubble mounds. A small group of centrally located structures include a circular building with an apsidal eastern end, commonly interpreted as a chapel. The settlement occupies a low, triangular terrace bordered to the south by the al-Qāʿ depression, which functioned as a water-collection area fed by channels draining from the northwest and retained by a sandstone dam. Architectural remains cover an area of approximately 800 x 400 m, with the northeastern portion largely devoid of structures. Construction techniques vary, ranging from dry-stone walls to lime-mortared masonry, with occasional decorative lime elements and carved crosses. Occupation extended into the surrounding hills, where associated features include a rock-cut hermitage, probable lime-processing installations, and adjacent rock art and inscriptions, though ceramic material is notably absent.

== Botany and agriculture ==
Archaeobotanical remains from Kilwa indicate access to a diverse range of plant foods, reflecting both local production and imported supplies. The presence of olive pits and olive charcoal in substantial quantities, together with abundant cereal-processing by-products such as wheat fragments, suggests that at least some crops were cultivated in the vicinity of the site. Barley, which is better adapted to arid conditions, was likely grown locally and may also have been used as fodder, whereas wheat, which has greater water and soil demands, was probably imported. The agricultural potential of the site is closely linked to nearby Qāʿ depressions. The Qāʿ are specific, local environments consisting of closed hydro-wind depressions of varying sizes, from tens to square meters to entire square kilometers. They collect runoff and fine sediments and create localized zones of higher moisture and fertility. Therefore, the Qāʿ depressions concentrate water for days to months at a time, up to an entire year, and they are the only place in the Kilwa region where soil can be found, making them critical for local grazing and agriculture, and they remain important for modern Bedouin and nomads, and they are still used for cereal cultivation, supporting flood-recession farming adjacent to the settlement. Historically, they would also have provided the historical monastic community with a sustainable agricultural base.

== Desert climate ==
Kilwa lies within an extremely arid desert environment, receiving generally less than 50 mm of annual rainfall. Mean winter temperatures are approximately 10 °C, while summer temperatures commonly reach 30 to 34 °C. Paleoclimatic studies indicate that similar conditions prevailed during ancient times, effectively precluding rain-fed agriculture. Vegetation is sparse and characteristic of the Saharo-Arabian region, dominated by drought-adapted perennial shrubs, ephemeral annuals that emerge after rainfall, and hardy taxa such as Haloxylon. Tree cover is limited and largely confined to valley bottoms, where acacias grow along wadi courses.

== History of research ==
=== Discovery and initial observations ===
The first archaeological documentation of Kilwa was made in passing, without directly naming the site, by the traveller Gertrude Bell in 1914, which she encountered during her journey to Hail City. In late 1932, George Horsfield, director of the Department of Antiquities of Jordan, Agnes Horsfield, and Nelson Glueck, director of the American School of Oriental Research in Jerusalem, organized a trip to be able to describe the site, with a focus on its rock engravings. Years later, Horsfield produced the first dedicated paper to describing Kilwa. From that time onwards, Kilwa began to attract the attention of prehistorians for its prehistoric remains. In 1980, the Department of Antiquities in Saudi Arabia plotted the area surrounding Kilwa, and registered its archaeological sites. Kilwa, in particular, was classified as a prehistoric site.

=== Excavations ===
The site has been investigated by various research teams, including Saudi–French and Saudi–Japanese joint missions under the supervision of the Ministry of Tourism. These expeditions have documented the engravings and tool assemblages, suggesting the Tabuk region, including Kilwa, was an important corridor for ancient human routes and possibly early trade networks. Scientific analyses, including rock varnish studies, have also been conducted at Kilwa and adjacent petroglyph sites to better understand the chronology and environmental context of the rock art.

=== Ongoing work ===
In 2005, the Ministry of Culture of Saudi Arabia asked the Saba Fares, a specialist in Arabic linguistics and ancient history at the University of Toulouse-Jean Jaurès, as well as a scientific director for archaeological projects in the Jordan (including at Wadi Ramm), to help research the al-Tubayq region. This eventually led to several seasons of excavations at the Kilwa between 2008 and 2010, for which a preliminary book-length report was recently published in 2025.

== See also ==
- Archaeology of the Arabian Peninsula
- List of archaeology sites of Saudi Arabia
