= Dawadmi =

Dawadmi الدوادمي
- Al Dawadmi
- Location within Saudi Arabia
- Coordinates: 24°39.7′N 44°23′E
- Country: Saudi Arabia
- Province: Riyadh Province
- Governorate: Al-Dawadmi

Area
  - Metro: 27,740 km^{2} (10,710 sq mi)

Population (2022 census)
  - City: 86,861
  - Metro: 200,620 (Al Dawadmi governorate)
- Time zone: UTC+3 (AST)
  - Summer (DST): UTC+3 (AST)

Dawadmi (Arabic: الدوادمي; also spelled as Ad Dawadimi and Al Duwadimi) is a town in Riyadh Province, Saudi Arabia. As of the 2022 census it had a population of 86,861. The town is mostly inhabited by the tribe of Banu Zaid.

It is located on top of Najd hill, the central area of Saudi Arabia. It is about 200 kilometres (120 mi) west of Riyadh. By road, is located 320 kilometres (200 mi) by road west of Riyadh.

In April 2003, the new airport in the city was inaugurated by the Crown Prince of Saudi Arabia. King Abdulaziz palace is a landmark of the city and there is an ongoing rehabilitation project to protect it.

== Etymology ==
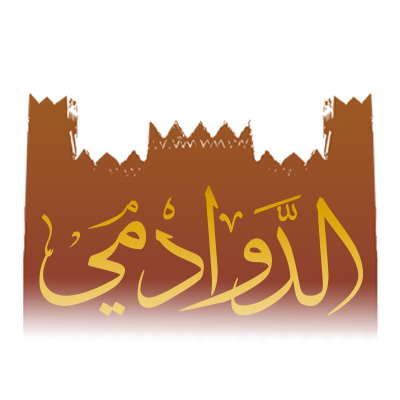
Al-Dawadmi written in Arabic

The name "Al-Dawadmi" is believed to be derived from the abundance of a particular type of tree known locally as al-dawadim. This tree is known for its use in tanning processes. The name may have originated from the region's notable presence of samar and acacia trees, which produce a reddish substance reminiscent of blood. These trees are plentiful in the area, giving rise to the name associated with their abundance and the significance of their products.

== History ==
Dawadmi town holds historical significance as one of the ancient human settlements located in the heart of the Arabian Peninsula. The mountains and valleys of the region are adorned with traces of human presence, including inscriptions, graffiti, and depictions of both humans and animals. Notably, faded images of large lions can be found, surrounded by remnants of mining operations and scattered stone rubble. These archaeological remnants provide evidence of the rich history and early human activity in the area.

=== Archaeology ===
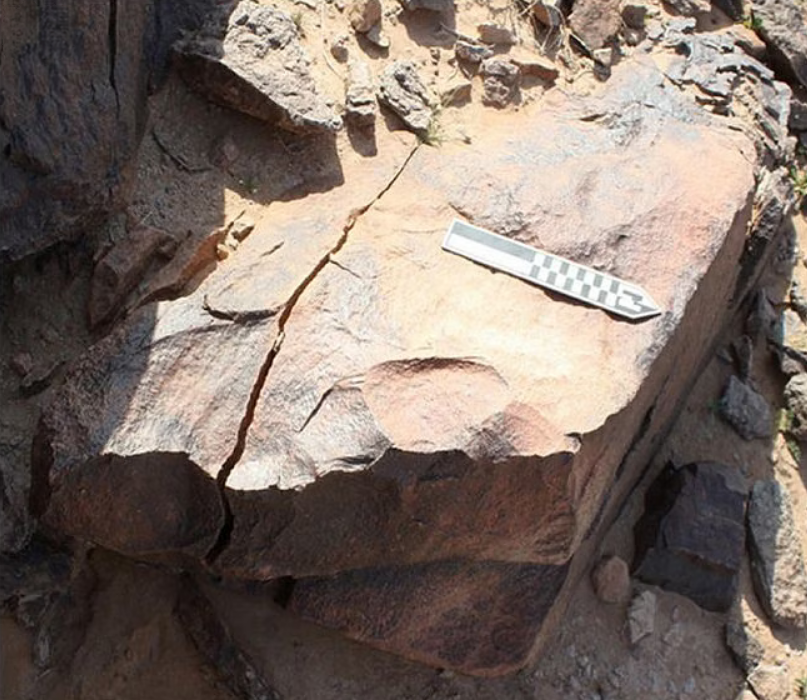
inscriptions on a rock in Safqa settlement, southeast of Dawadmi

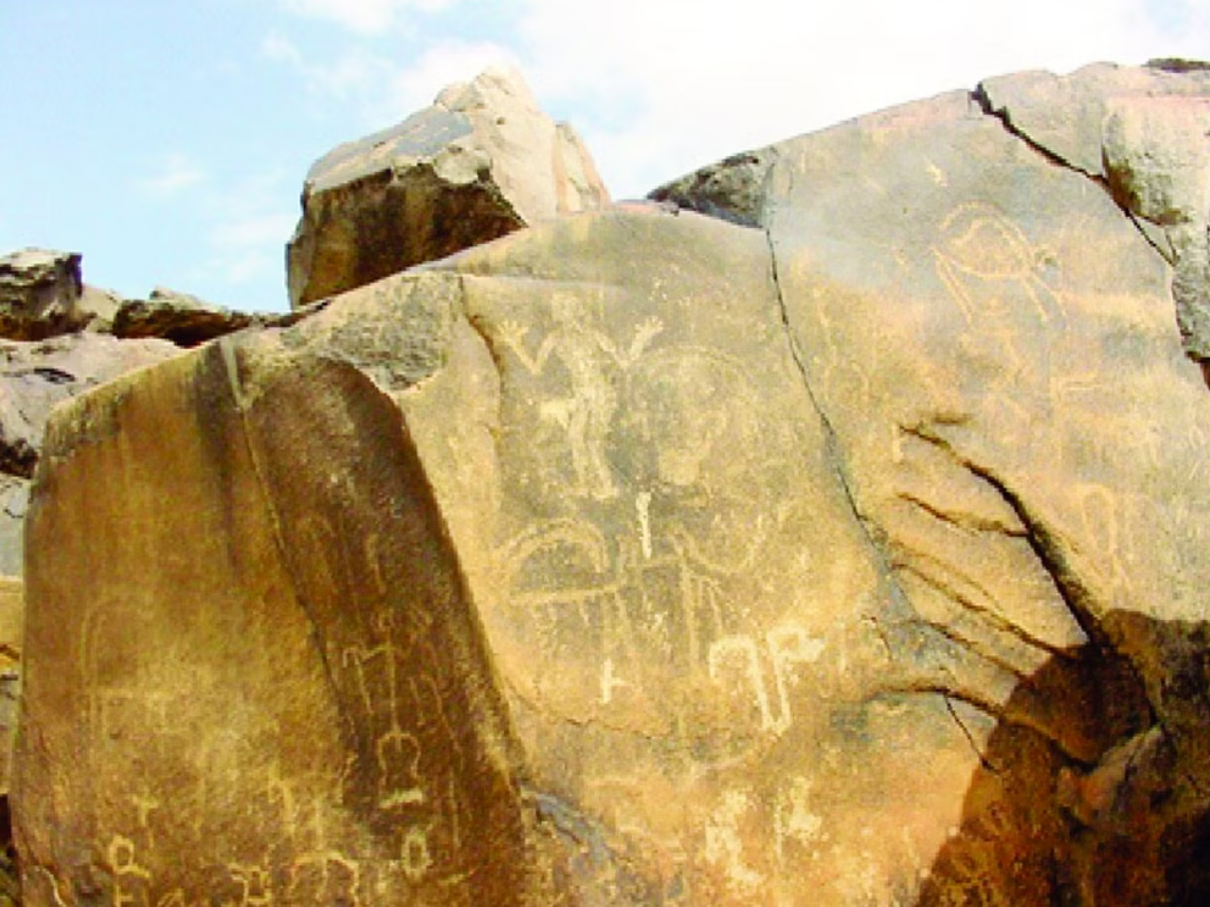
Historical inscriptions in Jabal al-Baydatain (the two eggs mountain), Al Dawadmi

== Geography ==
=== Al Dawadmi Governorate ===
Al-Dawadmi Governorate is a Saudi governorate located in the northwest of the Riyadh Region. It is affiliated with the Emirate of Riyadh Region. The governorate shares borders with Shaqra and Murat Governorates to the east, Afif Governorate to the west, and Al-Rass Governorate (administratively affiliated with Al-Qassim Region) to the north. To the south, it is bordered by Unaizah Governorate, Al-Mithnab Governorate, and Al-Bukayriyah Governorate, all of which are administratively part of the Qassim region. These governorates are adjacent to the northern part of the administrative scope of the city of Buraidah, which serves as the seat of the emirate of the Qassim region.

Covering an area of approximately 28,000 square kilometers, Al-Dawadmi governorate ranks fifth among the governorates in the region in terms of area. It is primarily located within the Arab Shield region, and its average width is 215 km. The governorate is notable for having a regional airport, distinguishing it from other governorates in the Riyadh region.

=== Climate ===
Climate data for Dawadmi, Saudi Arabia (2012-2021)
Month	Jan	Feb	Mar	Apr	May	Jun	Jul	Aug	Sep	Oct	Nov	Dec	Year
Mean daily maximum °C (°F)	22 (72)	24 (75)	29 (84)	33 (91)	38 (100)	41 (106)	42 (108)	42 (108)	40 (104)	34 (93)	27 (81)	23 (73)	33 (91)
Daily mean °C (°F)	16 (61)	17 (63)	22 (72)	26 (79)	31 (88)	34 (93)	35 (95)	35 (95)	33 (91)	28 (82)	21 (70)	17 (63)	26 (79)
Mean daily minimum °C (°F)	9 (48)	11 (52)	15 (59)	19 (66)	24 (75)	27 (81)	28 (82)	28 (82)	26 (79)	21 (70)	14 (57)	11 (52)	19 (67)
Average precipitation mm (inches)	3.2 (0.13)	3.1 (0.12)	9.3 (0.37)	29.1 (1.15)	2.9 (0.11)	13.0 (0.51)	7.2 (0.28)	10.7 (0.42)	1.3 (0.05)	0.1 (0.00)	20.1 (0.79)	7.6 (0.30)	107.6 (4.23)
Average dew point °C (°F)	0 (32)	−1 (30)	0 (32)	2 (36)	1 (34)	−3 (27)	−2 (28)	−1 (30)	−2 (28)	−1 (30)	5 (41)	2 (36)	0 (32)
Source: Time and Date

== Monuments ==
- King Abdul Aziz Palace, situated to the west of Dawadmi, holds historical significance. It was commissioned by King Abdul Aziz on Safar 7, 1349 AH(approximately 1930 CE). The construction of the palace was entrusted to Abdul Rahman Abu Bakr, a respected figure from Dawadmi.
- Bassam Palace, also known as the Old Quarter, was the site of a significant battle between the forces of the first Saudi state and the Ottoman Turks.

== See also ==
- List of cities and towns in Saudi Arabia
- Regions of Saudi Arabia
- Dawadmi Domestic Airport
- Eqab bin Mohaya
