= Expedition of Khalid ibn al-Walid (Dumatul Jandal) =

Muslim military expedition to Dumatul Jandal in October 630 AD

Date	October 630 AD
Location	Dumat Al-Jandal
Result	Ukaydir b. 'Abd al-Malik al-Kindi agrees to pay Jizyah; 2,000 camels, 800 slaves, 400 coats of mail, and 400 lances, of ransom paid.

Commanders and leaders
Khalid ibn al-Walid	Ukaydir ibn Abd al-Malik al-Kindi

Strength
420 horsemen	Unknown

Casualties and losses
0	1 Ukaydir captured

Expedition of Khalid ibn al-Walid, to Dumat Al-Jandal, to attack the Christian Prince of Duma, took place in March 631 AD, 9AH, 11th month of the Islamic Calendar, or October 630 AD according to William Montgomery Watt.

== Expedition ==
=== Attack on Duma Castle ===
According to Ar-Rahīq al-Makhtum (The Sealed Nectar), a modern Islamic hagiography of Muhammad written by the Indian Muslim author Saif ur-Rahman Mubarakpuri, Muhammad sent Khalid ibn Walid to Dumatul Jandal, against Ukaydir ibn Abd al-Malik al-Kindi, the Christian prince of Dumatul Jandal (the area is also known as Duma).

Khalid ibn Walid was sent with 420 horsemen and Muhammad said to Khalid: "You will see him hunting oryxes".

When Khalid came to the castle of the Christian prince, he saw oryxes coming out rubbing their horns against the castle gate, and he saw Ukaydir hunting the oryxes.

Ukaydir's brother was also out hunting, and after a short struggle, Khalid ibn Walid captured and killed him. Then he took Ukaydir captive, but he was quickly surrounded by his followers.

=== Hostage and ransom ===
After Khalid took Ukaydir captive, he threatened to kill him if the gates of Duma were not opened.

Khalid brought him back to Muhammad, who spared his life for a ransom of 2000 camels, 800 slaves, 400 armours and 400 lances. He brought all this booty back to Madinah, along with the captive, he also brought another brother of the Prince of Duma. Mubarakpuri, mentions that another condition for sparing his life and making peace with him, was that he recognize the duty of paying the tribute (Jizyah) and must collect the Jizyah from Dumat, Tabuk, Ailah and Taima’.

== Classical Islamic sources ==
The event is also mentioned by the Muslim Scholar Ibn Sa'd in his book "Kitab al-tabaqat al-kabir", as follows:

The Apostle of Allah, may Allah bless him, then sent Khalid Ibn al-Walid at the head of four hundred and twenty horsemen in Rajab of the ninth year, in a sariyyah against Ukaydir Ibn 'Abd al-Malik, at Dumat al-Jandal. (The distance) between it and al-Madinah is equal to (fifteen nights (journey)). Ukaydir belonged to the Kindah control over whom he had obtained, and he was a Christian.

Khalid reached there, he had emerged from his fort in the moonlight along with his [ P. 120 ] brother Hassan, to hunt a wild cow. The horsemen of Khalid lbn al-Walid attacked them. He (Khalid) captured Ukaydir. His brother Hassan resisted and fought till he was killed. Those, who were with them, fled away.

Then he entered the fort and Khalid granted him amnesty against being slain, till he was produced before the Apostle of Allah, may Allah bless him, on the condition that he surrendered Dumat al-Jandal. He complied and he (Khalid) concluded peace with him for two thousand camels, eight hundred heads of cattle, four hundred coats of mail and four hundred spears. He set apart the special share of the Prophet, may Allah bless him. Then he divided the spoils after separating al-Khums and what was set part for the Prophet, may Allah bless him. Then he distributed the remainder of the spoils among his companions. For every one of them there were five shares. Now Khalid Ibn al-Walid set out with Ukaydir and his brother Musad. who was in the fort, and with what he had concluded peace on, to return to al-Madinah. He presented Ukaydir to the Apostle of Allah, may Allah bless him. He (Ukaydir)...

[Kitab al-tabaqat al-kabir, By Ibn Sa'd, Volume 2, Pg 205]

The event is also mentioned in the Sunni hadith collection Sunan Abu Dawud, it is written:

The Prophet (peace_be_upon_him) sent Khalid ibn al-Walid to Ukaydir of Dumah. He was seized and they brought him to him (i.e. the Prophet). He spared his life and made peace with him on condition that he should pay jizyah (poll-tax).Sunan Abu Dawud 19:3031

== See also ==
- Military career of Muhammad
- List of expeditions of Muhammad
