= Dawadmi Domestic Airport =

Dawadmi Domestic Airport مطار الدوادمي المحلي
- IATA: DWD; ICAO: OEDM

Summary
- Airport type: Public
- Operator: General Authority of Civil Aviation
- Serves: Dawadmi (Al Dawadmi)
- Location: Riyadh Province, Saudi Arabia
- Elevation AMSL: 3,026 ft (922 m)
- Coordinates: 24°26′59″N 044°07′16″E

Map
- Location of airport in Saudi Arabia

Runways
Direction	Length		Surface
Direction	m	ft	Surface
15/33	3,050	10,006	Asphalt

Dawadmi Airport (Arabic: مطار الدوادمي, IATA: DWD, ICAO: OEDM), also known as Dawadmi Domestic Airport (Arabic: مطار الدوادمي المحلي), is an airport serving Dawadmi, a city in the Riyadh province in Saudi Arabia. The airport was established in 2003.

The airport lies in the Najd some 30 km (16 NM) west of the town center of Dawadmi. The airport has a single runway in roughly NNW to SSE direction. In April 2003, the new airport in the city was inaugurated by the Crown Prince of Saudi Arabia.

== Facilities ==
The airport resides at an elevation of 3,026 feet (922 m) above mean sea level. It has one runway designated 15/33 with an asphalt surface measuring 3,050 by 45 metres (10,007 ft × 148 ft).

== Airlines and destinations ==
Airlines offering scheduled passenger service:

Airlines	Destinations
Saudia	Jeddah, Riyadh

== See also ==
- Saudia
- List of airports in Saudi Arabia
- Riyadh Province
