= Camel Carving Site =

Archaeological site in Al-Jawf, Saudi Arabia

- نحت الجمل الأثري (Arabic)
- Location: Saudi Arabia
- Region: Al-Jawf Province

The Camel Carving Site (Camel Site) is considered one of the most prominent archaeological sites of Prehistoric Arabia. It dates to the Neolithic period of the Al-Jawf region in modern-day Saudi Arabia, specifically located in the eastern center of Sakaka Governorate. It is one of the most significant rock art discoveries in the region to date, and was ranked in the top 10 archaeological discoveries in 2021.

== Discovery ==
The first instance of the discovery dates back to 2010, when the former director of the Saudi Commission for Tourism and National Heritage in Al-Jawf visited the site and issued a report. The former director then returned in 2016 with a Saudi-French team to make an official record of the site.

A scientific study was then conducted by a combined Saudi and international team of researchers from the Heritage Commission, King Saud University, the French National Center for Scientific Research (CNRS), Max Planck Institute, the Free University of Berlin and Oxford University, whose results were published in the Journal of Archaeological Science in April 2022. The results of the study were officially announced during the scientific conference held by the Heritage Commission in September 2022.

== Site carvings ==
The site includes 21 carvings, 17 of which are figures of camels, two are of the equine family, and another whose identity is not clear. The site "likely has the oldest known surviving large-scale animal reliefs in the world", differing in execution from the rock art common throughout Saudi Arabia, given the carving's significant prominence from the rock face. The site is also considered among Saudi Arabia's oldest rock art sites, which typically feature two-dimensional carvings in both prominent and recessed styles, indicating an advanced school of art in the field of rock art.
