= Dumat al-Jandal Wall =

Dumat Al Jandal Wall
- سور دومة الجندل
- Interactive map of the Dumat Al Jandal Wall area

General information
- Status: Historical
- Location: Dumat Al-Jandal, Saudi Arabia
- Coordinates: 29.9444°N 39.5035°E

Height
- Height: 5 meters

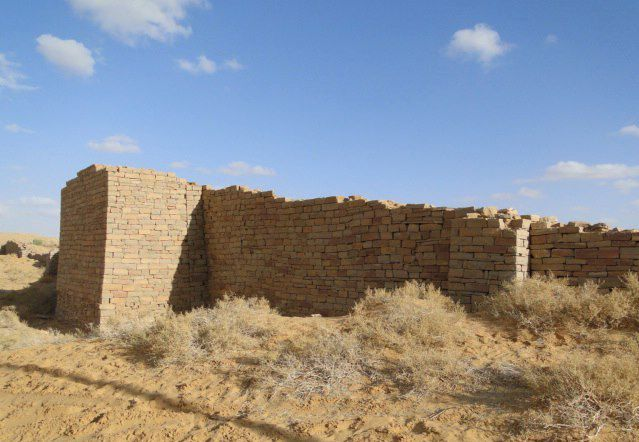
Dumat Al-Jandal Wall

Dumat Al-Jandal Wall is located on the west end of Dumat al-Jandal in Al-Jawf province, in northwestern Saudi Arabia. The wall is 5 meters high and its built out of stone, the wall surrounds ancient Dumat al-Jandal.

== Description ==
The wall is built out of mud and stones dated back to the 1st century CE, its main purpose is to protect the city of Dumat Al-Jandal. The wall is considered to be one of the oldest historical sites of the northwestern region of the kingdom. A private property surrounds the wall from the East and the West, a clearing land is at the North of the wall, and a mountain from the South. The wall was built on the same building pattern as Marid castle.

"As for Doma was protected by a fence, inside the fence there is a strong castle called Marid, it is the castle of the King Ekaider Bin Abdul Malik Bin Abulhi Bin Aa'a Bin Al Harith Bin Muyawia Bin Khalawah Bin Imama Bin Sulm Bin Shukama Bin Shapep Bin Ashras Bin Thor Bin Ogair Bin Kundah Al Sokony Al Kundi." Said Yaqut al-Hamawi about Dumat Al-Jandal's wall.
