= Al Naslaa =

Rock formation in Saudi Arabia

Al Naslaa صخرة النصلة
- Rock formation
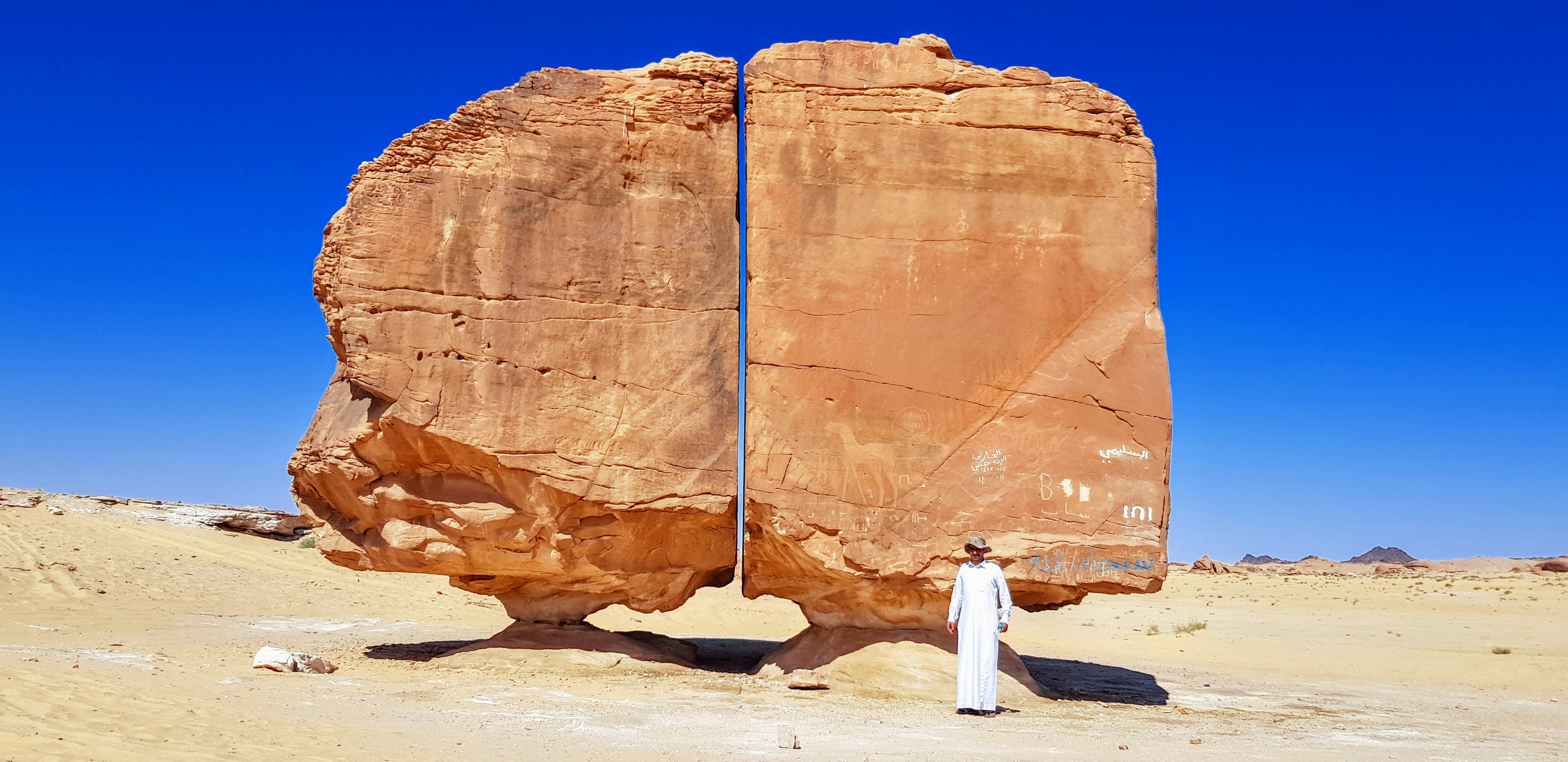
- Al Naslaa rock in 2021

- Location in Saudi Arabia
- Coordinates: 27.22945°N 38.57158°E
- Location: 50 km south of Tayma, Saudi Arabia
- Geology: Sandstone

Dimensions
  - Width: 9 m (30 ft)
  - Height: 6 m (20 ft)

The Al Naslaa rock (صخرة النصلة) is a landform 50 kilometres (31 mi) south of the Tayma oasis in Saudi Arabia. It is a large sandstone rock split neatly down the middle into two parts, both balanced on small pedestals. The exact cause of the split is uncertain. Proposed explanations include natural jointing, tectonic fracturing, freeze–thaw weathering, and subsequent erosion by wind and water.

The rock is about 6 metres (20 ft) high and 9 metres (30 ft) wide, and is covered on its south-east face with numerous petroglyphs, including depictions of horses and ibex.

== See also ==
- List of individual rocks
