= Jabal al-Baidain =

Jabal al-Baidain is a mountain located in the province of Dawadmi of the Riyadh Region in central Saudi Arabia. The mountain is known for its archaeological value, drawings and Thamudic inscriptions.

== Description ==
Jabal al-Baidain is an archeological site representing a mountain located 13 km southwest of Dawadmi, where traces of ancient settlements were found near its base, as well as stone drawings of animals, including camels and pines, as well as inscriptions written in the Badia-Thamudic script.
