= Dumat al-Jandal =

Historical city in Saudi Arabia

- دُومَة ٱلْجَنْدَل (Arabic)
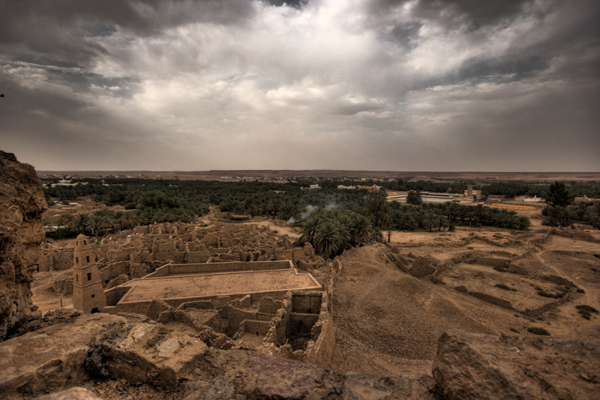
- The ruins of the ancient city of Adummatu

- Location within Saudi Arabia
- 29°48′41″N 39°52′06″E
- Type: Settlement
- Location: Al-Jouf Province, Saudi Arabia
- Part of: Saudi Arabia

Site notes
- Condition: In ruins
- Public access: yes

Dumat al-Jandal (Arabic: دُومَة ٱلْجَنْدَل, romanized: Dūmat al-Jandal, lit. 'Dumah of the Stone', pronounced [ˈduːmat alˈdʒandal]), also known as Al-Jawf or Al-Jouf (Arabic: ٱلْجَوْف, lit. 'cavity/depression'), which refers to Wadi Sirhan, is an ancient city of ruins and the historical capital of the region that is now al-Jouf Province in northwestern Saudi Arabia. It is located 37 kilometres (23 mi) from Sakaka.

The city stood north of the Nafud desert and at one end of Wadi Sirhan, at a major intersection of ancient trade routes part of what is known as the incense trade route, with one branch linking the various sources of valuable goods in India and South Arabia with Lower Mesopotamia, and another linking the Persian Gulf through Wadi Sirhan with southern Syria. It is surrounded by the historical Dumat al-Jandal Wall and stands within an oasis.

Some scholars identify this site as territory of Dumah, one of the twelve sons of Ishmael mentioned in the Book of Genesis.

== Etymology ==
The name Dumat al-Jandal means literally "Dumah of the Stone"; the name Al-Jawf means "depression", referring to Wadi Sirhan. The city's ancient Akkadian name was Adummatu, as attested on the Esarhaddon Prism (673–672 BC), where it is described as "the strong city of the Arabians."

== History and archaeology ==
=== Prehistory ===
In 2020, archaeologists reported discovering a 35-meter long triangular megalithic stone platform surrounded by burials and dating back to the 6th millennium BCE, presumably dedicated to ritual practices. Archaeological researchers from France, Saudi Arabia and Italy, headed by Olivia Munoz, believe that these findings illuminate a pastoralist nomadic lifestyle and a ritual used in prehistoric Arabia.

=== Ancient Near East ===
The city has a history dating back to the 10th century BC and is mentioned in Akkadian inscriptions of the Neo-Assyrian Empire dating to 845 BCE, in which it is referred to as Adummatu and is described as the capital of an Arab kingdom sometimes named as Qedar (Qidri). The names of five powerful Arab queens that ruled this city are known, among them Zabibe, Šamši, Tabūʿa, and Teʾelḫunu. The latter is also given the title of high priestess of Atarsamain, a deity of fertility, love and war associated with Ishtar. Dūmah was the site of an important temple dedicated to Ishtar. The ancient city of Duma was described as "the stronghold of the Arabians" on the Neo-Assyrian Esarhaddon Prism (cuneiforms on clay prism, 673-672 BC).

This town is perhaps intended in a passage from Isaiah:

The "Dumah" Pronouncement.

A call comes to me from Seir:
"Watchman, what of the night?
Watchman, what of the night?"

The watchman replied,
"Morning came, and so did night.
If you would inquire, inquire.
Come back again."

— Isaiah 21:11–12

=== Nabataean kingdom ===
Sacrifices of animals were common and Porphyry's De Abstenentia (3rd century AD) reports that in Dūmah, a boy was sacrificed annually and was buried underneath an altar. Some scholars have extrapolated this practice to the rest of the Nabataeans.

Excavations made by Khaleel Ibrahim al-Muaikel in 1986 added to observations made in 1976 that a homogeneous layer of Roman-Nabataean pottery sherds indicating a prosperous community during the time of the Nabataeans, to whose realm this part of the region probably belonged.

Excavations in 2011 uncovered a large open-air Nabataean triclinium (banqueting hall) on a rocky promontory within the western settlement of the oasis. The U-shaped structure, built of stone benches instead of walls, was primarily used between the late 1st century BC to the late 1st or early 2nd century AD. Pottery vessels and fireplaces distributed across the surface attest to gatherings held at the site. Among the remains were serving bowls, cereal grains, dates, figs, olives, pomegranates, grapevine charcoal, and burned caprine bones.

Between 2009 and 2018, the site was the focus of a joint Saudi–Italian–French archaeological mission, whose published findings — including the 2011 discovery of the Nabataean triclinium and the 2020 report of a 6th-millennium BC megalithic platform — have substantially expanded scholarly understanding of the oasis.

=== Roman period ===
In AD 106, Dumah was incorporated into the Roman Empire by the emperor Trajan, after annexing the Nabataean Kingdom. Dumah became the part of the province of Arabia Petraea. In the fourth century, the region of Dumah was re-defined by the Romans as Palaestina Salutaris.

Dumah remained integral to the Limes Arabicus for over four centuries, serving as the easternmost settlement along the limes. In AD 269, the place was mentioned by Zenobia, the Queen of Palmyra, as a city with an immune fortress. After her forces had captured the city, the Marid Castle withstood the attack in her revolt against the Romans.

=== Byzantine and Sasanian clients ===
The ancient oasis town was among a number of cities that the Pre-Islamic Arabs would travel to as part of the sequence of market fairs held annually. In contrast to the other market cities, Duma was characterized by its disputed political sovereignty between Arab clients of the Byzantines and Sasanians that made claims to it. The markets of Duma specialized in slavery and prostitution with the Banu Kalb, the dominant tribal group in the area, being known to practice slavery more than other tribes.

In 2017, a Paleo-Arabic Christian graffito discovered near al-Jawf and dating to AD 548/9, known as the Dumat al-Jandal inscription, was published. The inscription reads "May be remembered. May God remember Ḥgʿ{b/n}w son of Salama/Sa-lāma/Salima {in} the m[onth] (gap) year 443 [AD 548/549]."

=== During Muhammad's era ===
Due to its strategic location, the city had been the object of no fewer than three raids. It lay about fifteen days march north from Medina and about half that distance from Damascus.

Muhammad ordered the Expedition of Dumat al-Jandal in July 626. Muhammad had received intelligence that some tribes there were involved in highway robbery and preparing to attack Medina itself. No casualties were reported; the Ghaṭafān fled.

He also ordered the Expedition of Khalid ibn al-Walid (Dumatul Jandal), which took place in October 630 to attack the Christian prince of Duma, as well as the Expedition of Khalid ibn al-Walid (2nd Dumatul Jandal) in April 631 to demolish an idol called Wadd, worshipped by the Banu Kalb tribe. In 630, Khalid ibn al-Walid captured Dumat al-Jandal and it became part of the newly formed Islamic empire.

== Landmarks ==
=== Marid Castle ===
Marid Castle in Dumah

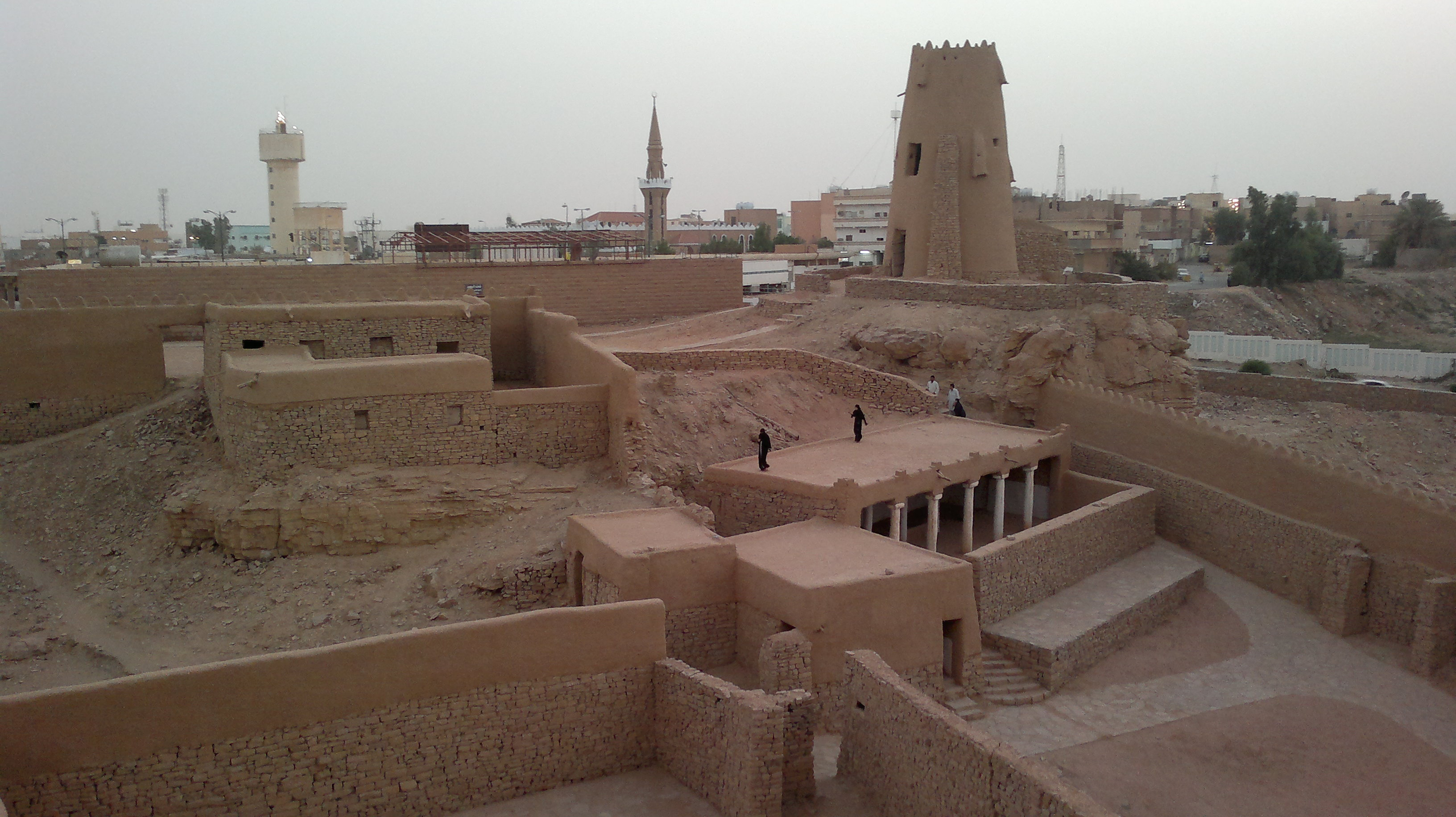
Inside view of the castle

=== Umar Mosque ===
Umar Mosque (wrongly attributed to Caliph Umar) is situated in Dumat al-Jandal. The mosque was built in 634–644. However, the actual construction appears to have been a much earlier period as a church. Some scholars believe that the mosque was named after the Banu Umar, a tribe that settled in Dumat al-Jandal.

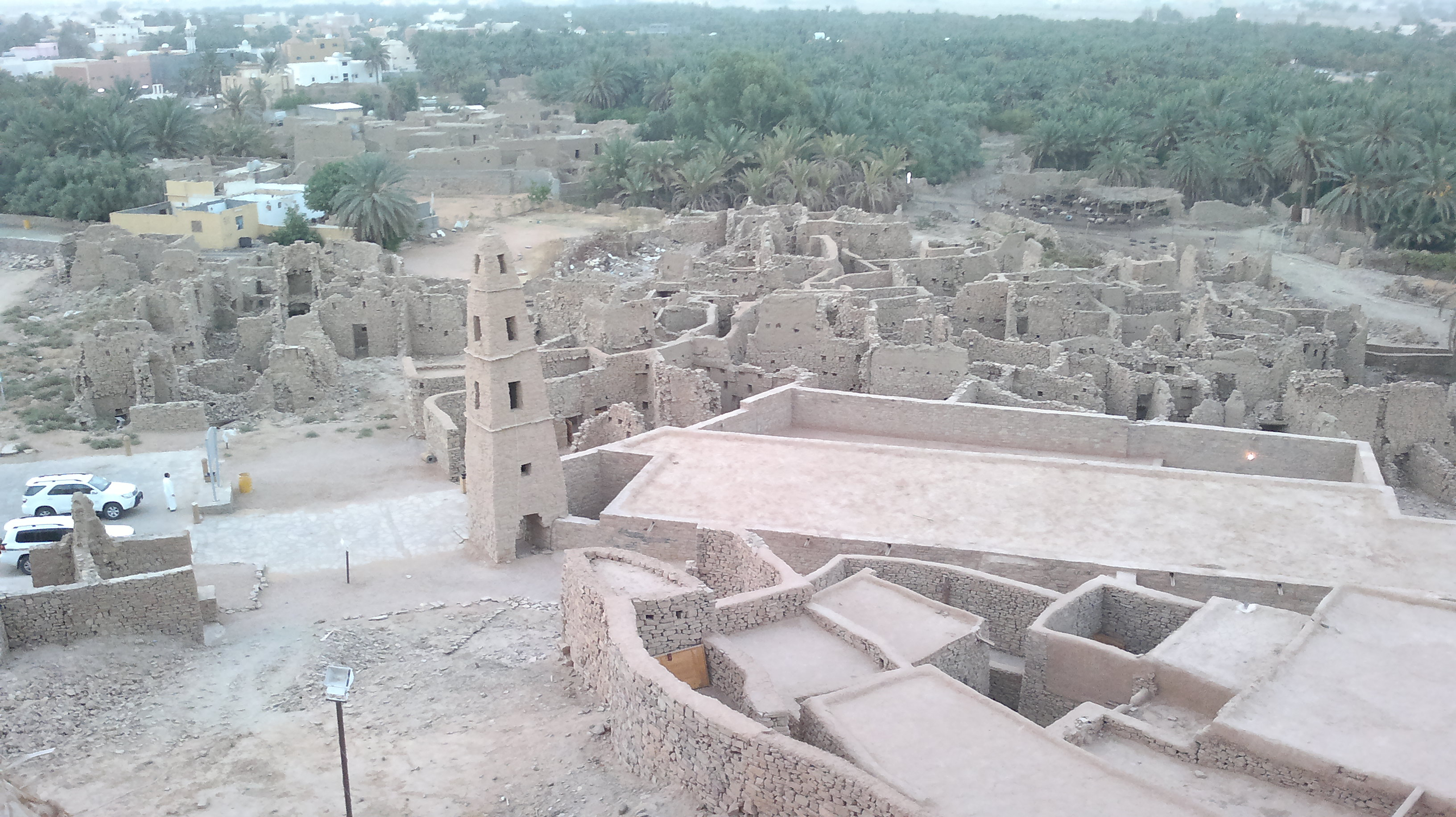
Omar Mosque and al-Dar'i Quarter in Dumat al-Jandal

The north (qibla) wall of the mosque faces the Marid Fort across a street. On its other three sides, it is surrounded by dense urban fabric. Like any other old town mosque, the stone construction comprises a courtyard preceding the main prayer hall to the south and another space, also used for prayer, to the north. The minaret is at the southwest corner of the prayer hall bridging over a street. The mosque is entered through a door situated in the qibla wall, near the minaret. The prayer hall is formed by three rows of stone pillars, running parallel to the qibla wall. The pillars are all by wooden lintels, which in turn support layers of stone that are roofed by mud-plastered acacia and palm trunks.

The mihrab is a narrow, corbelled niche in the center of the qibla wall, and is defined by a similar niche with three built-in stone steps to its right. The mihrab, the minbar, and the lower part of the qibla wall are plastered with white wash. Viewed from the outside, one sees that the mihrab and minbar protrude slightly out of the qibla wall. Also visible is an exposed stone staircase constructed along the qibla wall from the street side that reaches the roof. The minaret shaft has a rectangular shape that tapers upward to end in a pyramidal form. The four internal floors of the shaft were accessed by a now-collapsed spiral staircase entered from within the mosque. On each side of the minaret, and on each floor, a rectangular window with a stone lintel provides lighting for its interior.

=== Al-Dar'i Quarter ===
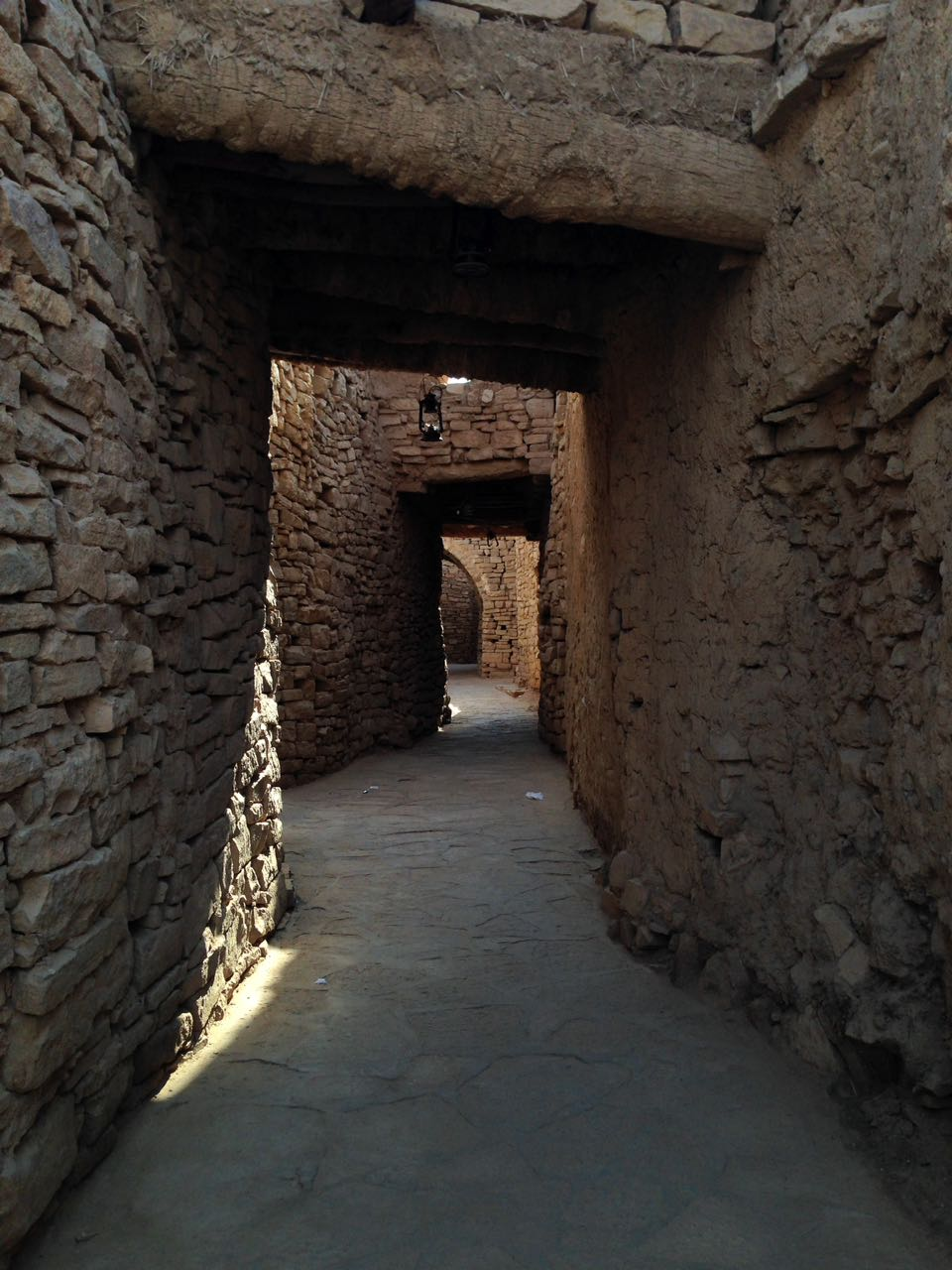
In the ancient town's Al-Dar'i Quarter

Al Dar'i Quarter is located in the neighborhood of Omar bin al-Khatab Mosque and Marid fortress, which represent the old quarter of Dumat al-Jandal. Al-Dar'i Quarter is considered to be one of the remaining antiquities of Dumat al-Jandal's ancient city, which has escaped the demolition shovels befalling the historical market of Dumat al-Jandal 25 years ago. Dr. Khalil Al Meaigil has stated that, the facilities of the quarter, which date back to the middle Islamic age, have been established on ancient layers dating back to the mid-first millennium BC.

The neighborhood is characterized by the stone buildings and stone lanes between the gardens and by the water, which made life possible for the residents who lived near by the springs. In the Al-Dar'i Quarter, there are many houses that archaeologists hope will enjoy the necessary care and restoration.

== Climate ==
In Dumat Al-Jandal, there is a desert climate. Most rain falls in the winter. The Köppen-Geiger climate classification is BWh. The average annual temperature in Dumat Al-Jandal is 22.2 °C (72.0 °F). About 59 mm (2.32 in) of precipitation falls annually.

Climate data for Dumat Al-Jandal
Month	Jan	Feb	Mar	Apr	May	Jun	Jul	Aug	Sep	Oct	Nov	Dec	Year
Mean daily maximum °C (°F)	15.3 (59.5)	18.7 (65.7)	23.2 (73.8)	29.0 (84.2)	33.7 (92.7)	37.3 (99.1)	38.8 (101.8)	38.9 (102.0)	37.6 (99.7)	32.3 (90.1)	23.0 (73.4)	17.2 (63.0)	28.8 (83.8)
Mean daily minimum °C (°F)	3.8 (38.8)	6.4 (43.5)	9.9 (49.8)	15.7 (60.3)	20.4 (68.7)	23.8 (74.8)	25.9 (78.6)	25.9 (78.6)	23.5 (74.3)	18.1 (64.6)	10.9 (51.6)	5.1 (41.2)	15.8 (60.4)
Average precipitation mm (inches)	10 (0.4)	3 (0.1)	8 (0.3)	13 (0.5)	0 (0)	1 (0.0)	0 (0)	0 (0)	0 (0)	10 (0.4)	6 (0.2)	8 (0.3)	59 (2.3)
Source: Climate-Data.org, Climate data

== See also ==
- Ancient Towns in Saudi Arabia
- Cities of the ancient Near East
- Expedition of Khalid ibn al-Walid (Dumatul Jandal)
- Expedition of Khalid ibn al-Walid (2nd Dumatul Jandal)
- List of cities and towns in Saudi Arabia
- Lake Dumat al-Jandal
