= Abu Loza's Bath =

Ancient bathhouse in Saudi Arabia

- حمام أبو لوزة
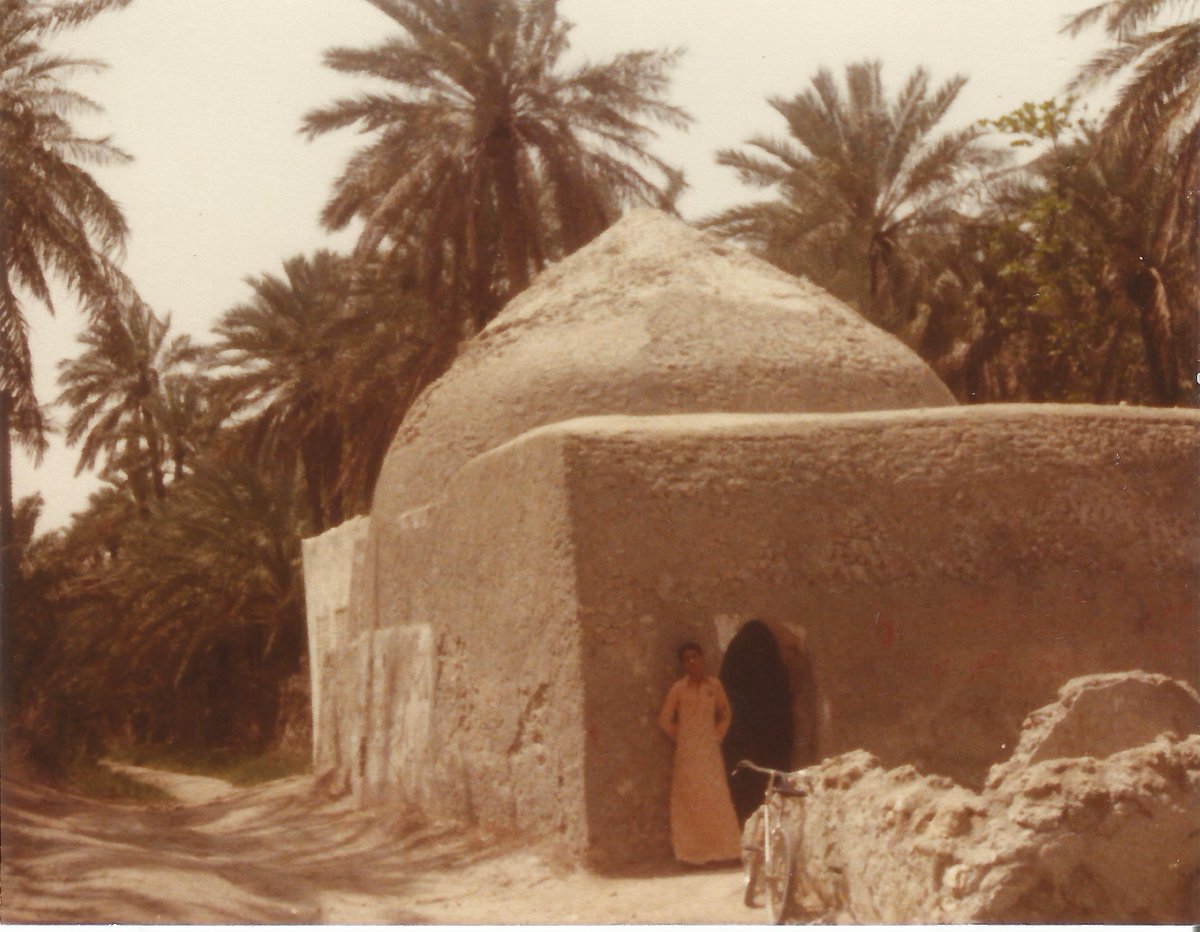
- An exterior view of the old Abu Loza's bath, with palm forests surrounding it.

General information
- Type: Hammam
- Location: Qatif, Eastern Province, Saudi Arabia, Saudi Arabia
- Coordinates: 49°59′24″N 36°33′26″E

Abu Loza's Bath is an ancient bathhouse featuring mineral sulfur water, located in the village of Al-Bahari in the western part of Qatif Governorate of Eastern Saudi Arabia. The bath was constructed in proximity to the Eye of Abu Loza, which historically served as a treatment site for skin diseases and joint pain.

The bathhouse was primarily frequented by the pearl hunters and residents of Qatif Castle, many of whom were merchants and influential figures in the region. Currently, Abu Loza's Bath is managed by the Saudi Ministry of Tourism, which has enclosed the site with a wire fence and assigned a local volunteer for its maintenance. Despite these efforts, the structure faces several challenges, including the risk of cracking, debris accumulation, and a decline in the water supply, which could lead to its closure to visitors and tourists.

Notably, the spring associated with Abu Loza experienced a complete drying up in the 1980s, which occurred later than similar springs in the governorate. Prior to this decline, the water level in Ain Bath reached heights of up to three meters.

== Etymology ==
Abu Loza's Bath was historically known as Bath Ain Abu Lozah. Over time, the name evolved into its current form, attributed to the dome's resemblance to the shape of a halved almond.

Al Ain was named after the Terminalia catappa, a species that was once commonly found in the farms throughout the Qatif region.

== Geography ==
Abu Loza's Bath is situated amidst farms and orchards in Seyhat al-Bahari, west of the village of Al-Khabaka, near the palm groves and agricultural lands of the town of Al-Qadih. It is located along the main road leading to Al-Awamiyah and Safwa, on the outskirts of the former metropolis of Qatif, northwest of the city

The bath is supplied with water from Ain Abu Loza, one of many springs in the area. Other nearby springs include Ain al-Bishra and Ain al-Rawasiya to the north and northwest, Ain al-Qatiniya and Ain Qasari to the south and southwest, and Ain al-Khabaqa to the southeast.

To the west of the men's bath stands a mosque, while to the east of the women's bath lies a stable for horses and donkeys, which were used to transport visitors from nearby villages and the metropolis of Qatif.

== History ==
The construction of Abu Loza's Bath is believed to date back to the 3rd and 4th centuries AH, possibly during the reign of the Qarmatians, or to the 5th and 6th centuries AH during the Uyunid Emirate period. The bathhouse underwent renovations during the Ottoman era, with the addition of several new facilities. Further restoration and expansion were carried out in 1281 AH (1864–1865 AD) by Ahmad Mahdi Al Nasrallah, the governor of Qatif appointed by Imam Faisal bin Turki during the Second Saudi State.

The bath was an active community center until the mid-1990s, when its natural spring began to dry up. A comprehensive restoration works began in August 2022 by the Heritage Commission of the Ministry of Culture. These efforts included structural reinforcement, reconstruction of collapsed sections, and restoration of its traditional architectural elements.

Dense palm forests once encircled Abu Loza Bathhouse, as seen in photographs from the 1960s to 1980s.

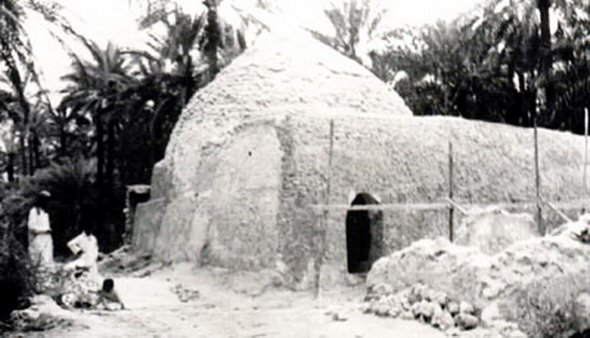

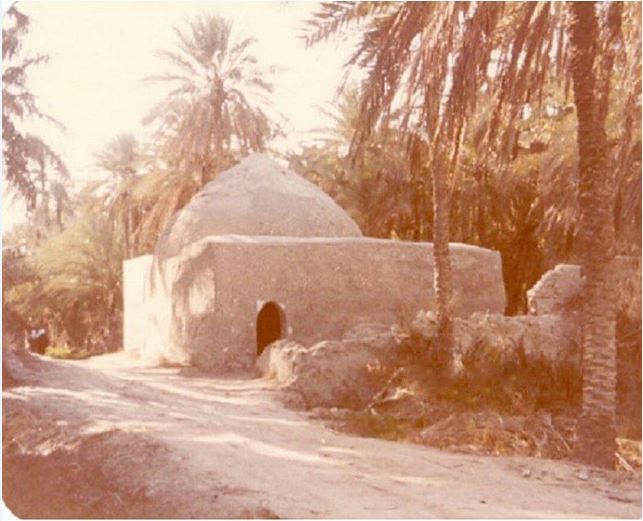

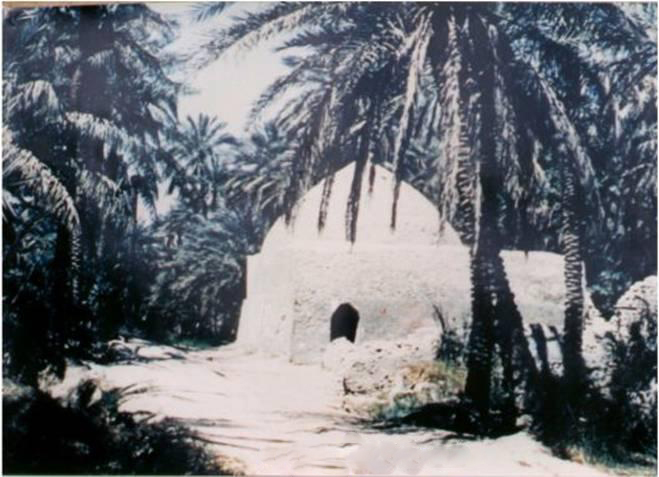

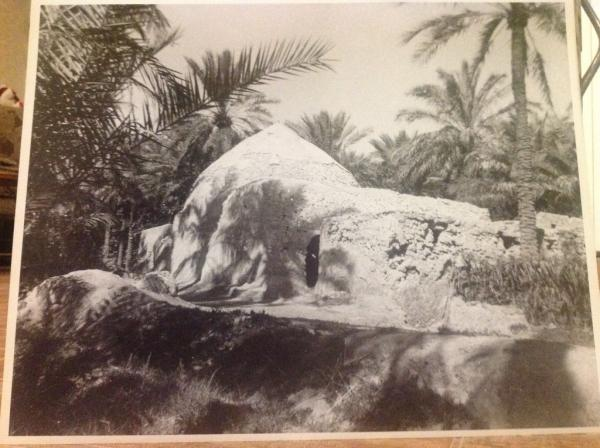

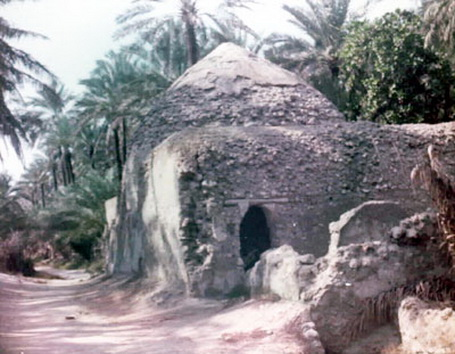

== Design ==
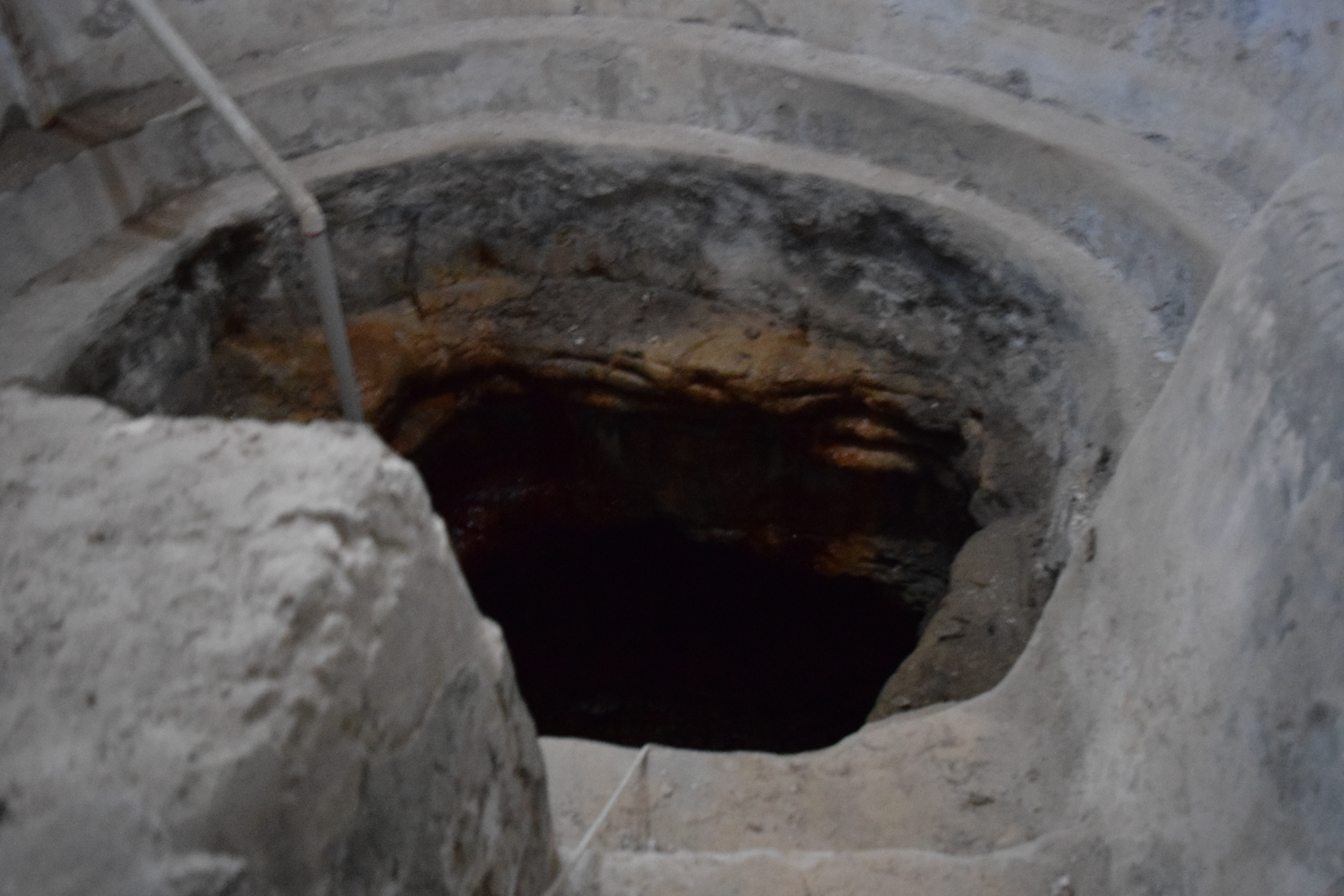
The water source of the bathhouse, as observed in July 2017, features steps along the edges of the spring. These steps were historically used for sitting and leaning by those utilizing the bath.

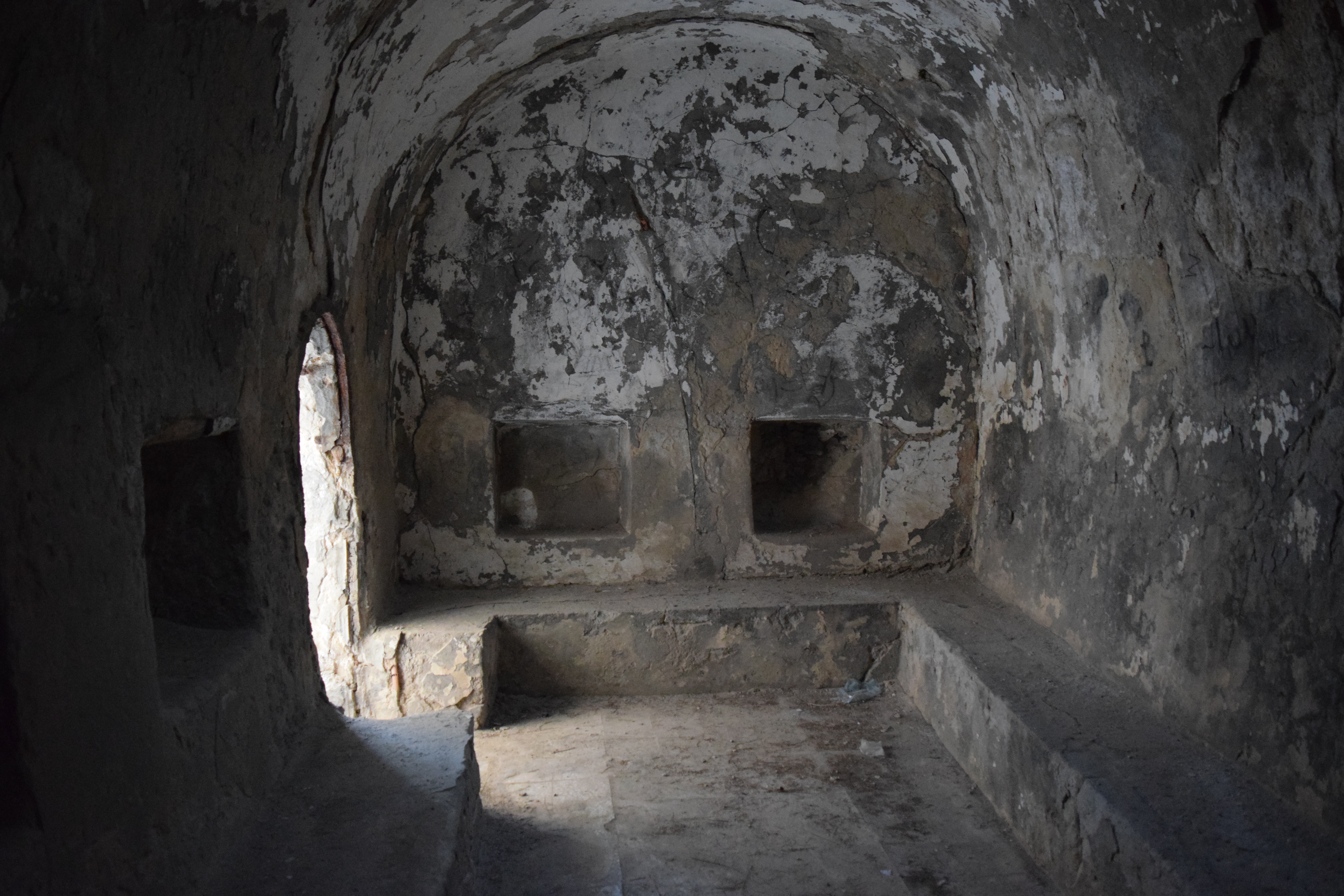
The men's toilet room, as seen in July 2017, served as a space for relaxation, massage, and conversation.

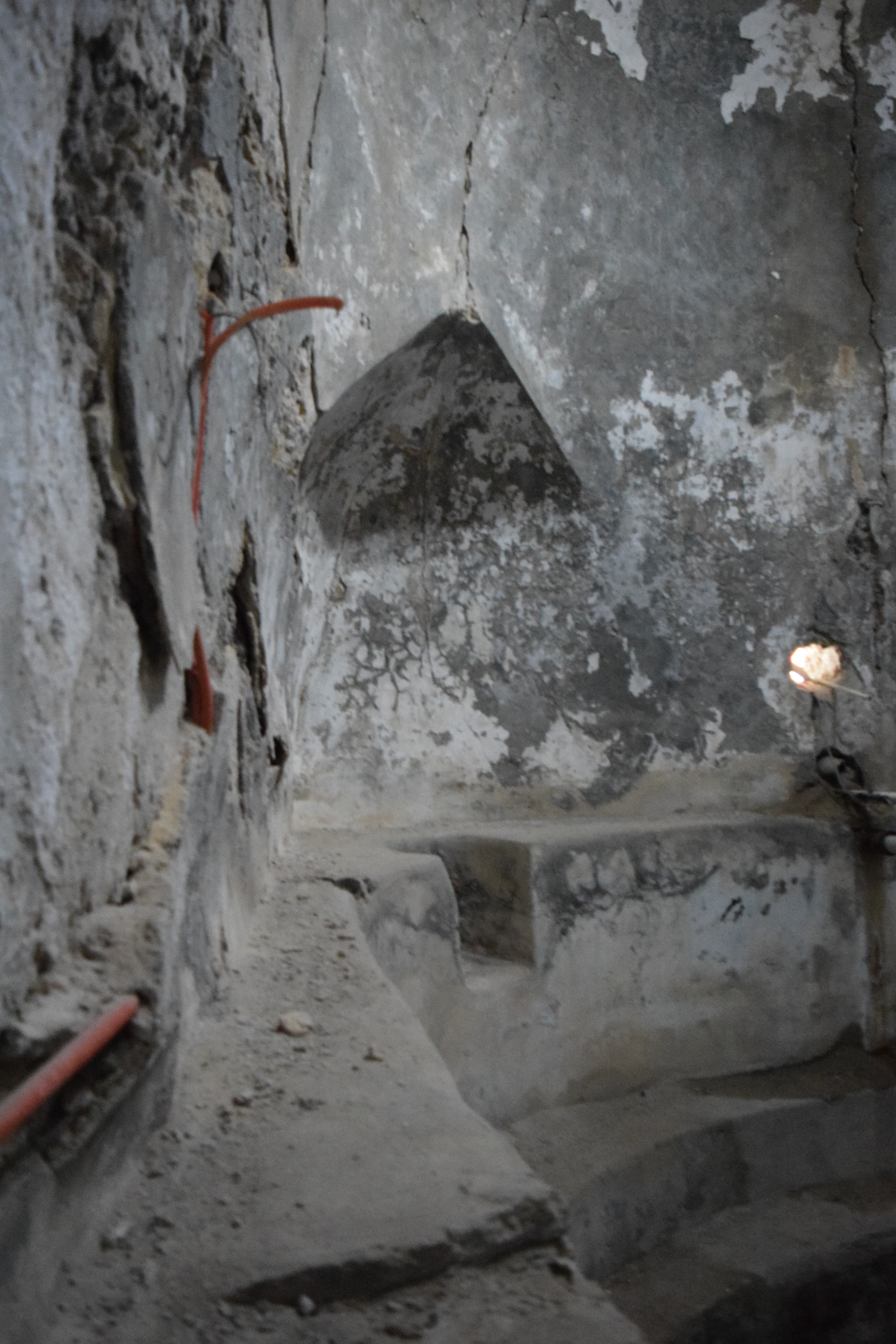
The bathhouse features architectural projections and protrusions designed to hold various items. These built-in elements were likely used to store or place personal belongings, bathing supplies, or other objects during the use of the facility.

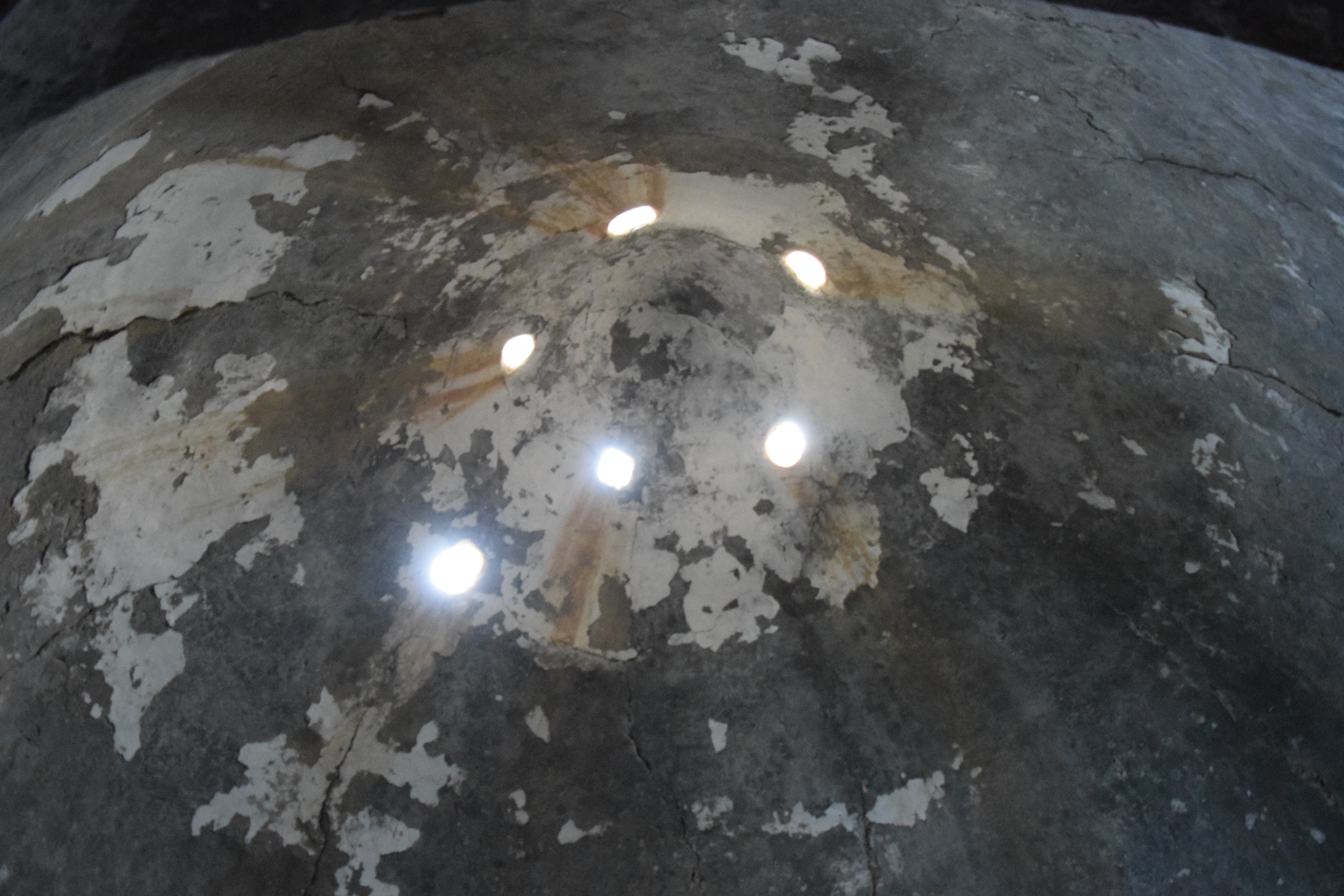
The dome of the bathhouse is equipped with ventilation and lighting vents located at its apex.

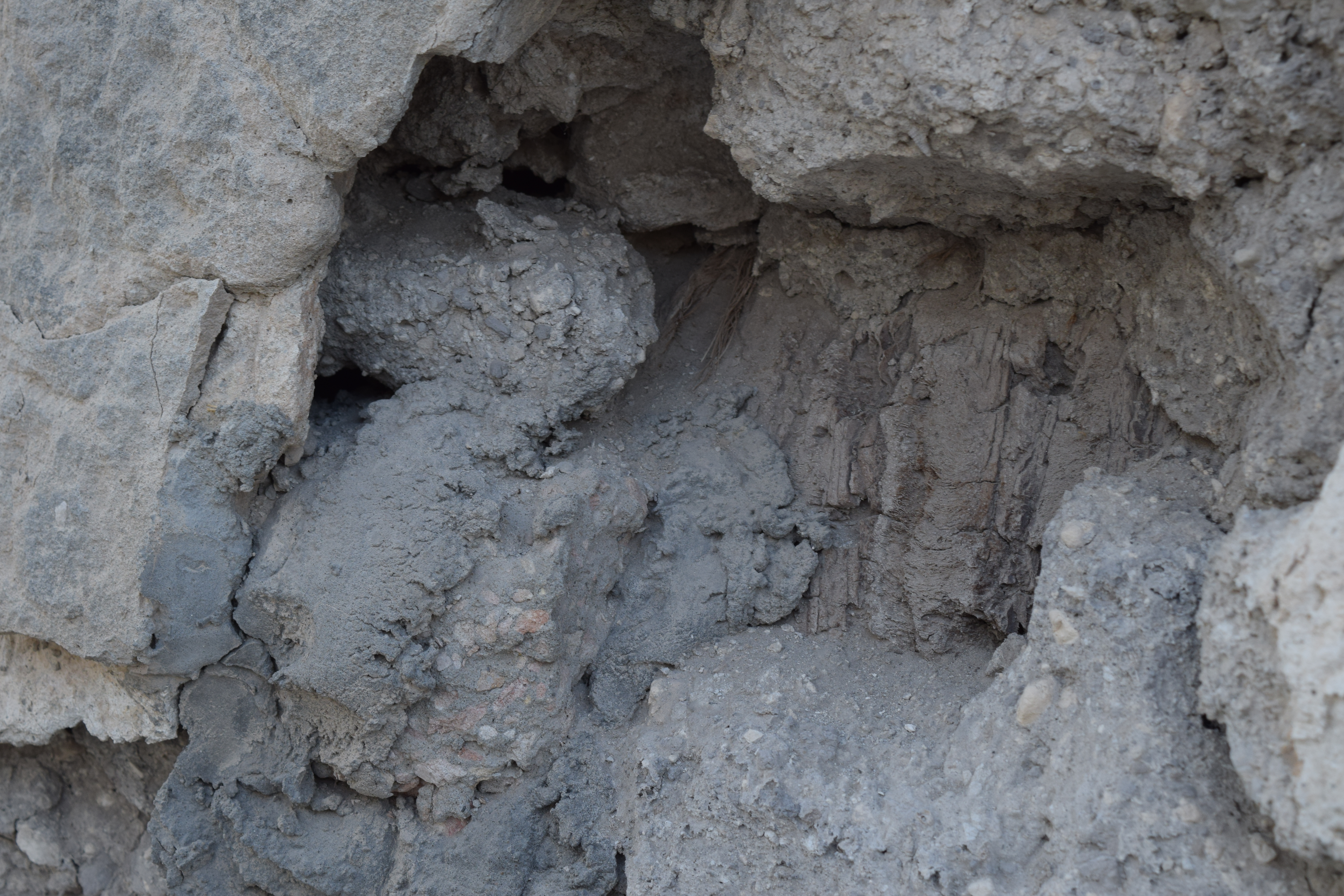
A crack in one of the walls of Abu Loza's Bath reveals a portion of its internal structure, showcasing the materials used in its construction. This includes plaster, stones, and palm trunks

The bathhouse is situated over a Sulfur water underground spring that descends to a depth of 22 meters. The underground springs in the Qatif Governorate are characterized by a relatively deep pit, with a deeper pit, known as a tanur, located at its center. This structure continues to contain increasingly deeper pits, extending down to the source from which the water emerges. This method of spring construction was historically recognized in the Persian Gulf region and is believed to have been utilized by the Canaanite tribes that settled in the eastern Arabian Peninsula. Most of the springs in Qatif were excavated using similar techniques, indicating reliance on manual labor and rudimentary methods of construction.

The bath is rectangular in shape, with dimensions of approximately 5 x 6 metres. The walls are between 3 and 5 metres high and 40 to 60 centimetres thick. The gate is in the form of a semicircular necklace. The dome ranges from 2 to 4 metres in diameter and 1 to 2 metres in height. The Bath has separate male and female sections, constructed in accordance with Qatifi architectural standards and composed of stone, Clay, Gypsum, and palm trunks. It underwent a restoration and renovation during the Ottoman era, incorporating elements of the hammams (Islamic bathhouses) that were prevalent during the Ottoman rule in the Levant and Iraq.

The bathhouse features a rectangular room situated adjacent to the eye spring. This room contains square-shaped niches, locally known as rozna, which were used for placing luggage and clothing. Along the length of the room, seating areas called dakat or daqqaq provide space for visitors to sit and rest, particularly during peak times at the bath. These areas are also utilized for enjoying tea and coffee while engaging in conversation, as well as for massages after bathing.

Above the main spring is a semicircular dome designed in the Turkish style, featuring openings for steam ventilation and natural sunlight. Inside the spring room, terraces known as jaluf serve as designated areas for resting while swimming. The cleaning area is referred to as tanweer. Additionally, there is a dedicated section for women located to the north of the hammam, characterized by a ceiling fully covered with palm trunks.

Furthermore, the property boasts a bathroom with a rectangular swimming pool, accessed via a canal directly from the source of the eye and surrounded by an upper terrace for seating.

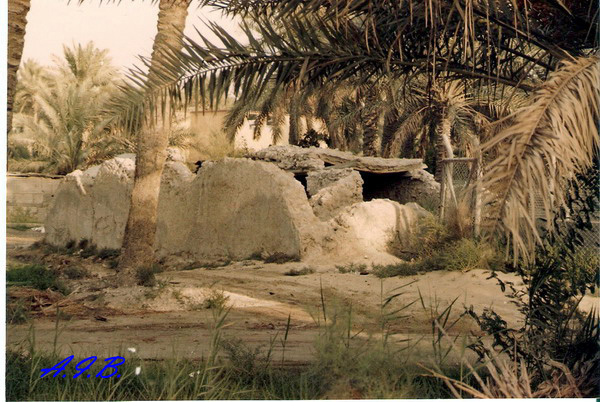
The women's bathing building to which the spring water from Ain Abu Luzah used to branch off.

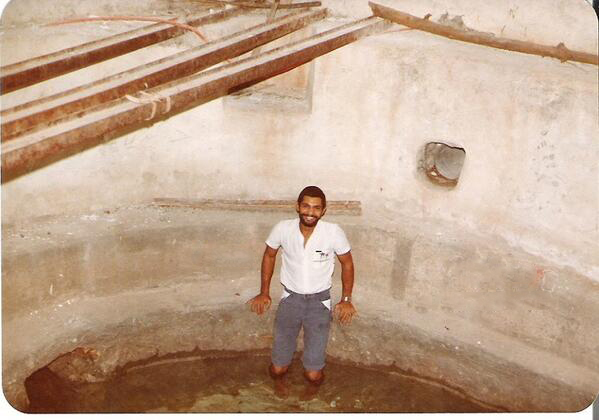
The former hammam spring room, the men's bathing room.

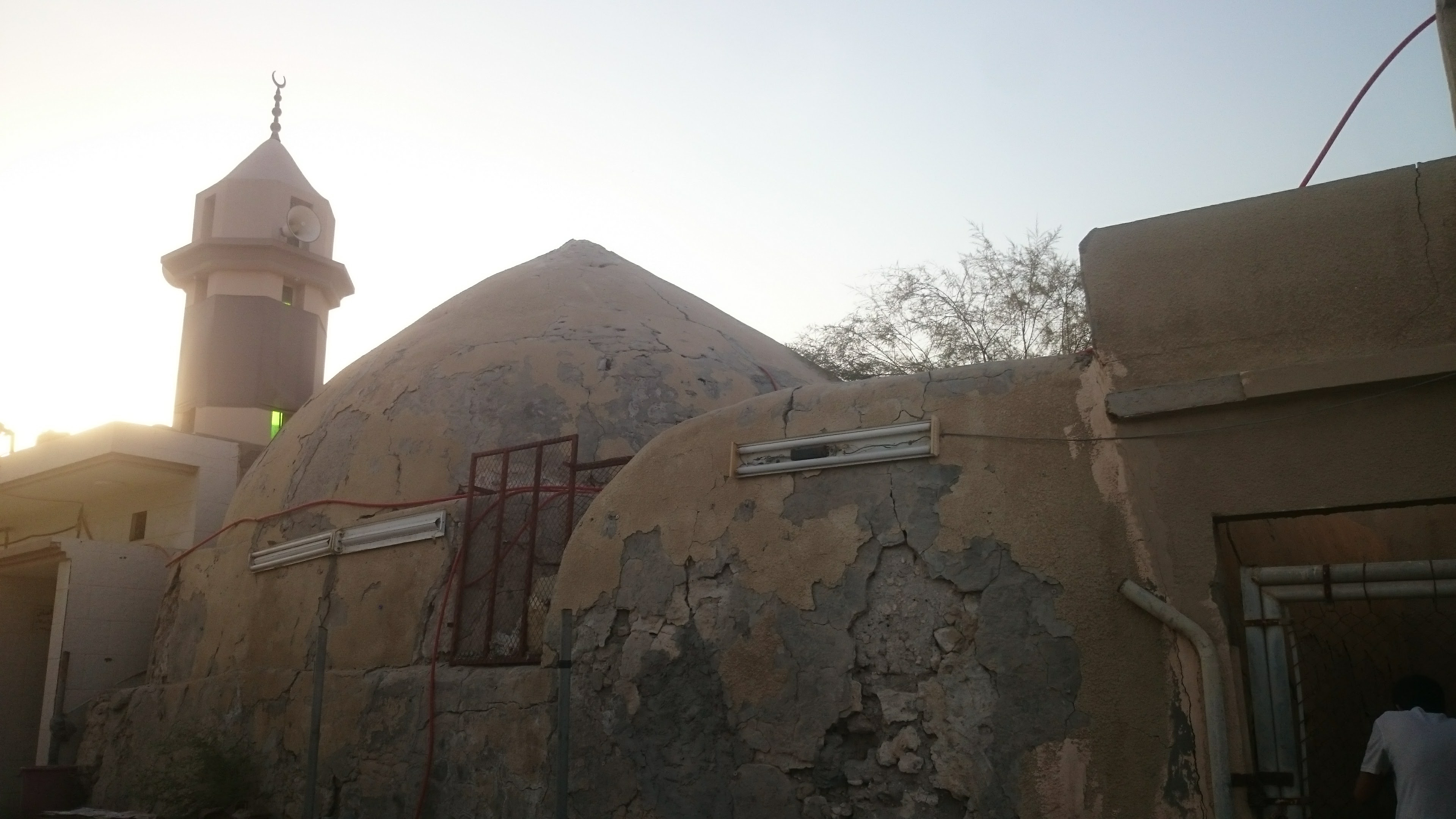
The exterior of the bathroom as seen in July 2017.

=== The dome ===
The spring room is crowned by a dome shaped like a pointed semicircle, evoking the form of an almond in its external appearance. This dome is constructed in the style characteristic of Turkish mosques and utilizes the muqarnas system. The design of domes during the Islamic periods typically involves transitioning from a square base to a circular surface, upon which the dome is seated. This technique serves to distribute weight and structural stress to each corner of the square chamber, while also creating an aesthetically pleasing shape. At the apex of the dome, circular openings facilitate air ventilation and sunlight entry, while also helping to reduce the density of the steam emanating from the spring.

Its name and the shape of its dome from the fruit of the almond cane tree, as it has a dome shaped like half an almond.

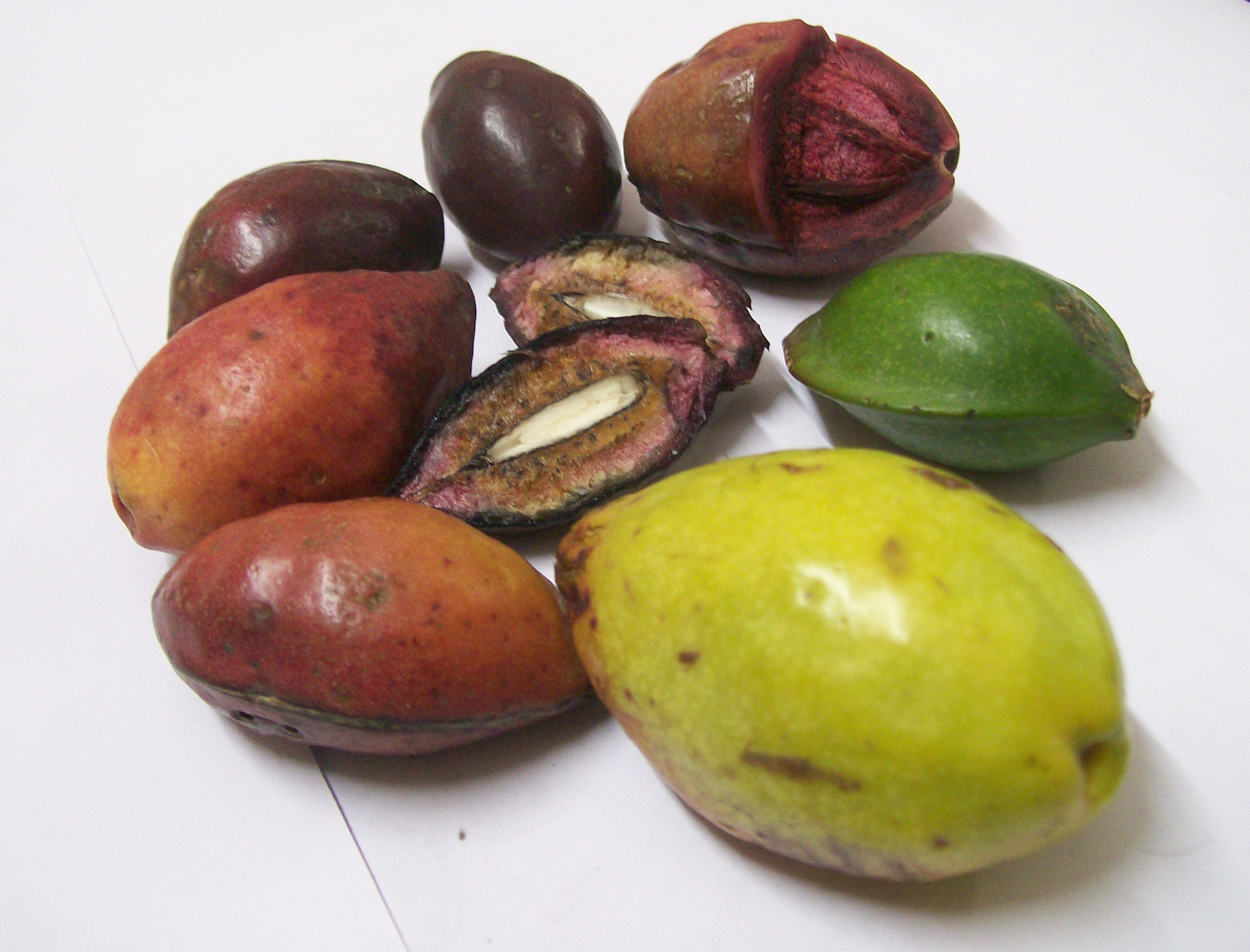

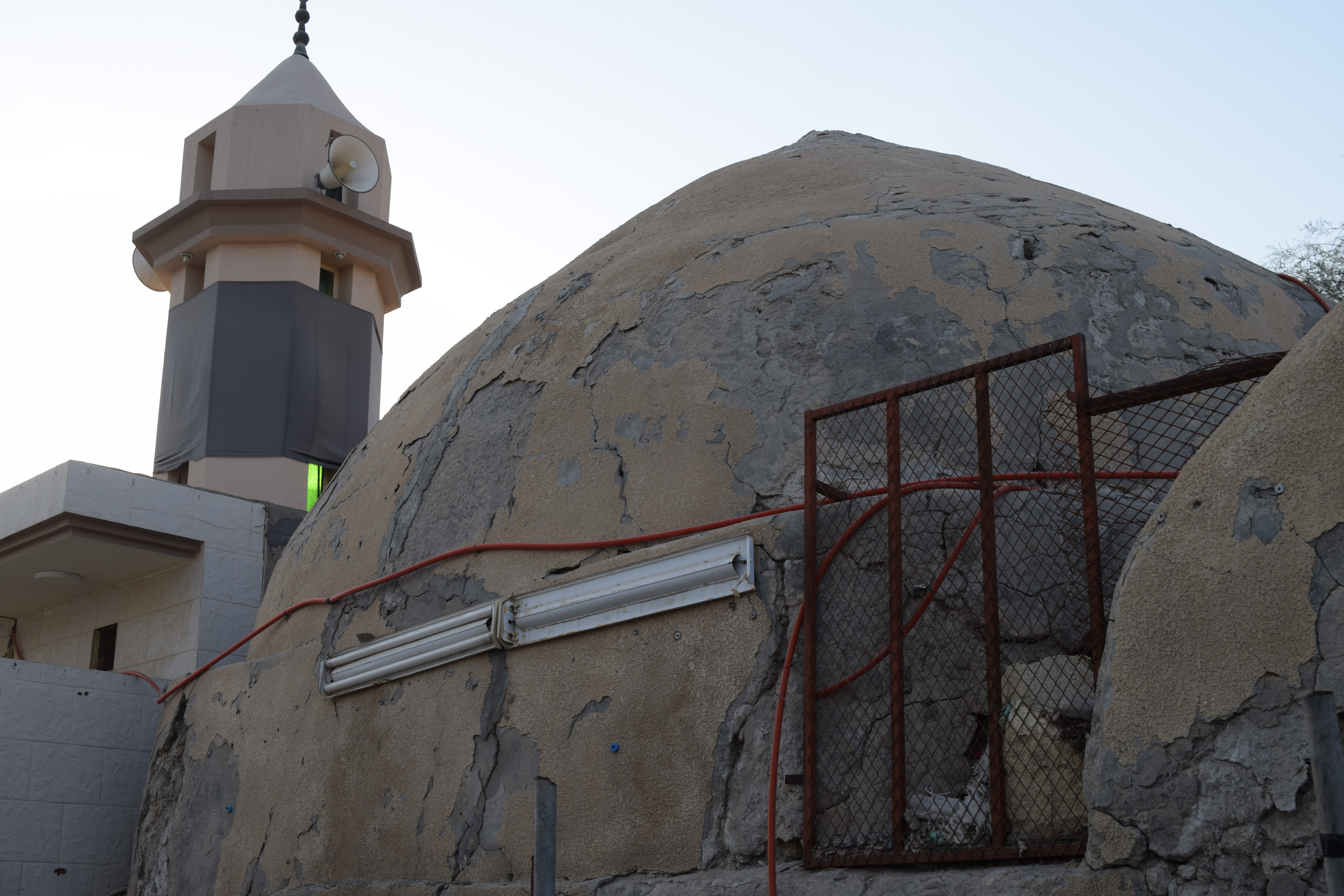

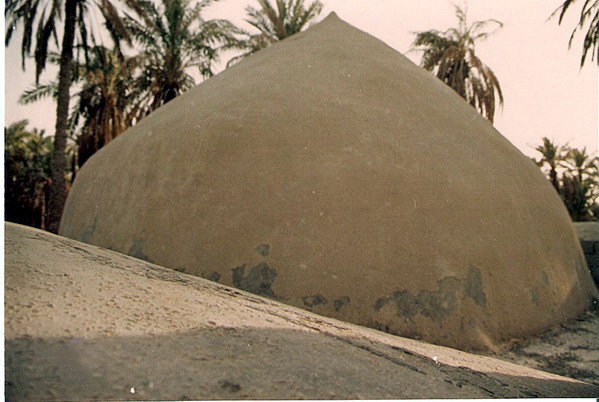

=== Bathroom extensions ===
The spring chamber is fitted with a drainage channel that was historically used to irrigate the adjacent fields. To the east of the women's bath, a stable for horses and donkeys was constructed to assist in the transportation of visitors from distant villages. Adjacent to the stable, a rectangular building was erected along the outer edge, housing small shops that offered personal care services, including the use of nora (a traditional method for hair removal) and shaving. To the west of the men's bath, a small mosque was built in close proximity to the bathhouse, providing a space for prayer for the visitors.

== Social customs and beliefs ==
Ain Abu Loza was historically a destination for individuals seeking treatment from its therapeutic waters, renowned for alleviating various skin diseases, joint pains, and back ailments. The spring's warm mineral water and the gases it emitted contributed to its popularity as a natural remedy. In response to this demand, locals constructed the Abu Luzah Bathhouse, along with the Tarut Bathhouse and Ain Badi Bathhouse in Al-Awjam. Ain Abu Loza served as a medicinal spring, with its mineral-rich waters utilized for health treatments. During the winter season, pearl fishermen would often halt their fishing activities to visit the Abu Luzah bath for cleansing and relaxation.

== Improvements and restoration ==
Efforts to restore and maintain Abu Loza’s Bath have been undertaken periodically from the late Ottoman and Second Saudi periods to the modern era. Abu Loza's Bath fell into disrepair during the 20th century, a process accelerated by the drying of its natural spring in the mid-1990s. The structure suffered from significant neglect, leading to cracks, collapsing ceilings, and the accumulation of debris. Over the years, the site has been the subject of several restoration attempts, community-led preservation initiatives, and finally, a comprehensive government-led restoration project.

=== 1981 restoration attempt ===
In addition to the restoration and improvement efforts undertaken during the Ottoman and Second Saudi Empires, Abu Loza's Bath underwent further restoration in the 1980s, facilitated by the Mudar Charitable Society. The General Authority for Tourism and National Heritage has declined multiple proposals for funding restoration work, prioritizing the preservation of the heritage landmark by avoiding the use of materials that could jeopardize its historical integrity.

The municipality of Qatif, in collaboration with the Mudhar Charitable Society, undertook efforts to revitalize Abu Loza's Bath. This initiative included addressing structural issues, such as repairing cracks, and involved the use of cement in restoring the dome and various walls. The floors were tiled with ground bricks as part of the renovation.

However, the restoration process introduced elements that were not in harmony with the bath's original character, raising concerns among preservationists. The lack of oversight by archaeological specialists, including the collapse of ceilings and the installation of iron skewers in the bath's corridors, which further compromised the integrity of this historic site.

=== Community initiatives and development proposals ===
Between 2010s and the early 2020s, the deteriorating state of the bathhouse prompted numerous community-led initiatives and municipal proposals aimed at its preservation:

- December 2020: Qatif Municipality illuminated the perimeter of Abu Luzah Bath as part of efforts to prepare the site for transformation into a tourist attraction.
- August 2015: Abu Loza's Bath was submitted for approval in the 2016 budget.
- September 2015: Qatif Municipality submitted a proposal to develop and restore Abu Luzah Hammam, along with several other heritage sites in the region. This initiative reflects the municipality's commitment to preserving the cultural heritage and historical significance of these locations.
- July 2014: an anthropomorphic rendering of Abu Luzah Bath was unveiled, aimed at showcasing the heritage of the site to the community. Engineer Saleh Abdullah Abu Aziz, the head of the festival, emphasized that the model serves as an effort to highlight and promote the cultural significance of the bathhouse among local residents.
- May 2013: Abdul Hamid Al-Hashash, the Director of the Dammam Museum of the General Authority for Tourism and National Heritage, announced the existence of a restoration plan for several archaeological sites in the Eastern Province, including Hammam Abu Luza and various other springs located throughout Qatif. These sites were identified as part of the Authority's upcoming projects, reflecting a commitment to preserving and revitalizing the region's cultural heritage.
- On April 18, 2013, more than 70 local volunteers coordinated with the General Authority for Tourism and Antiquities (now known as the General Authority for Tourism and National Heritage) to conduct a clean-up operation at Abu Luza Bath. This initiative, organized by the Qatif Al Ghad group, followed significant damage caused by a severe storm, during which debris was cleared from the site. The clean-up effort was conducted under the slogan "With Our Arms, We Revive Our Nation's Heritage," and was part of broader local volunteer campaigns aimed at preserving the cultural heritage of the Qatif Governorate.
- April 2013, a documentary focusing on Abu Loza's Bath was released, highlighting the efforts of a youth campaign initiated by the Green Bay Society for the Environment and Protection of Ancient Water Fountains. The Ruya Group produced the documentary titled "Abu Luzah Hammam: Who Washes Away Its Pain?" The three-minute film showcases the extensive cracks and fissures that have affected the walls and fences of the bathhouse, raising awareness about its deteriorating condition and the need for preservation efforts.

=== Heritage Commission restoration (2022–present) ===
In August 2022, the Saudi Heritage Commission began a comprehensive and systematic restoration project to preserve the historic landmark. The commission closed the site to the public to undertake extensive work, which included:

- Reinforcing the building's foundations and overall structure.
- Repairing cracks and other structural damage.
- Removing modern additions and materials incompatible with the bath's original construction.
- Rebuilding parts of the structure using historically appropriate techniques and materials.

Dr. Bodour Al-Othman, director of the Heritage Commission's Eastern Province branch, stated that the goal of the project is to prepare the site for reopening as a cultural and tourist destination. The commission plans to develop a strategy for public visits at designated times, transforming the bathhouse into a landmark that reflects the region's heritage and identity.

By early 2025, the exterior of the bathhouse appeared largely complete, presenting a restored and elegant facade.

== Gallery ==
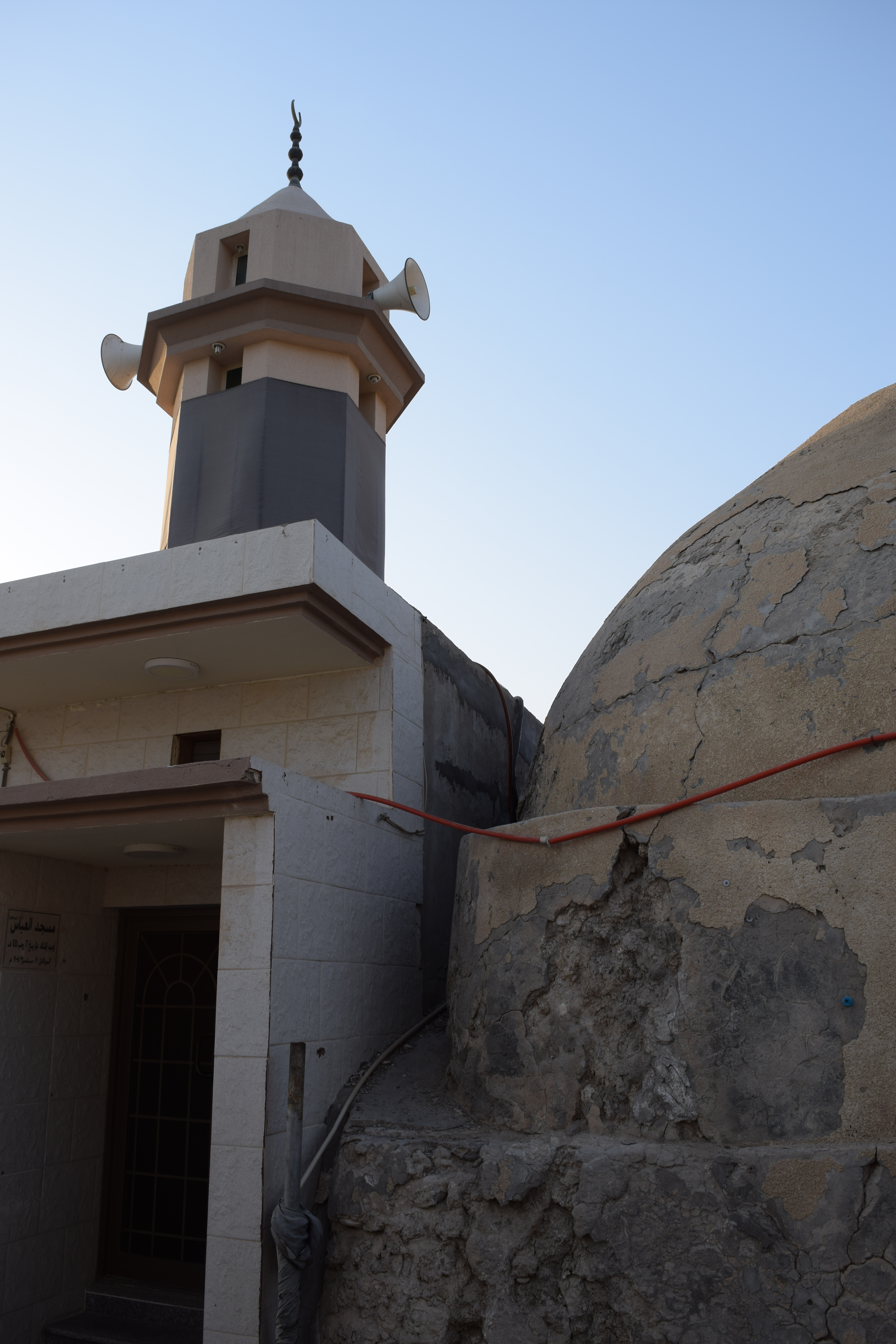
Al-Abbas Mosque next to the Abu Loza's Bath

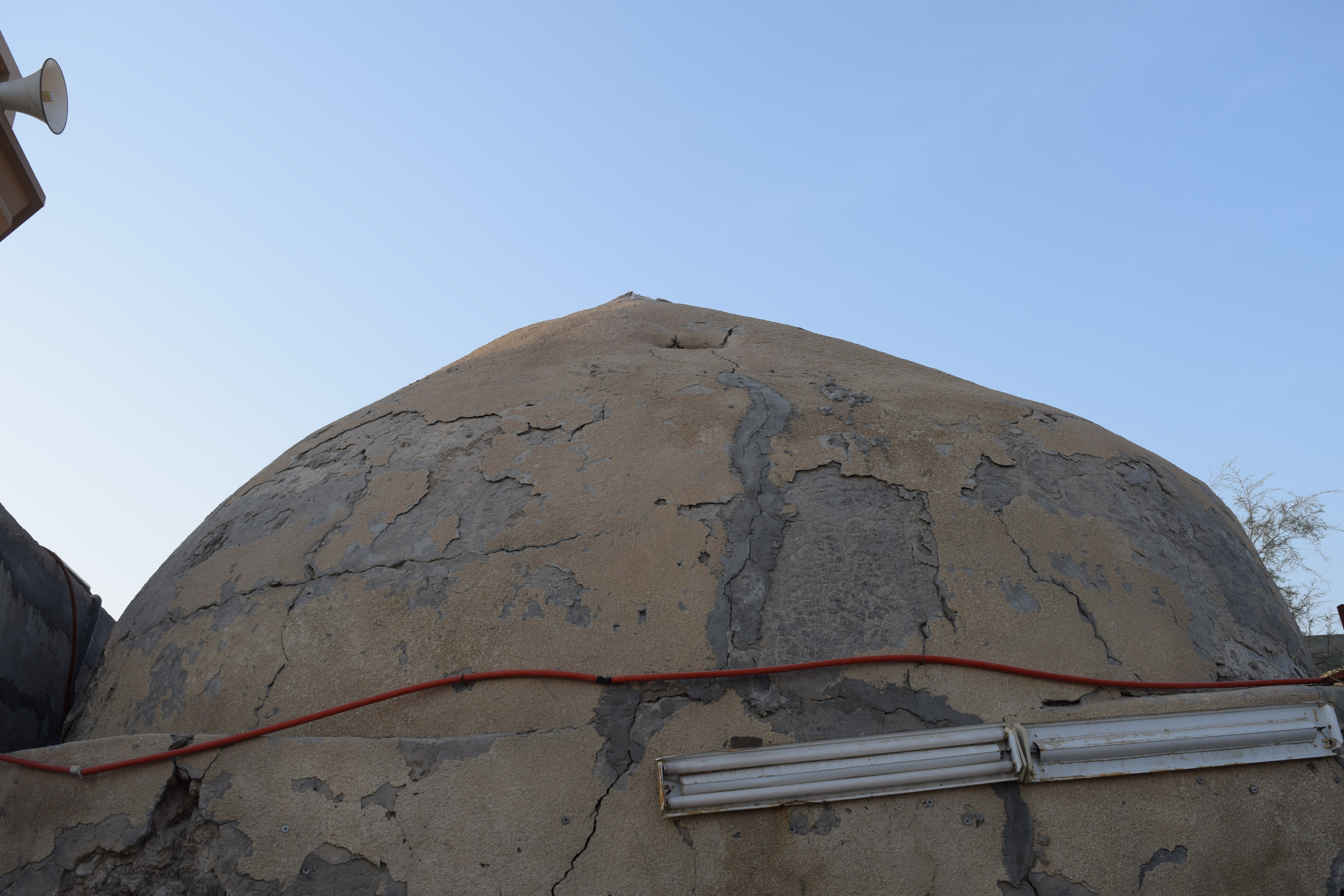
The dome of the Abu Loza's Bath, showing cracks and fissures

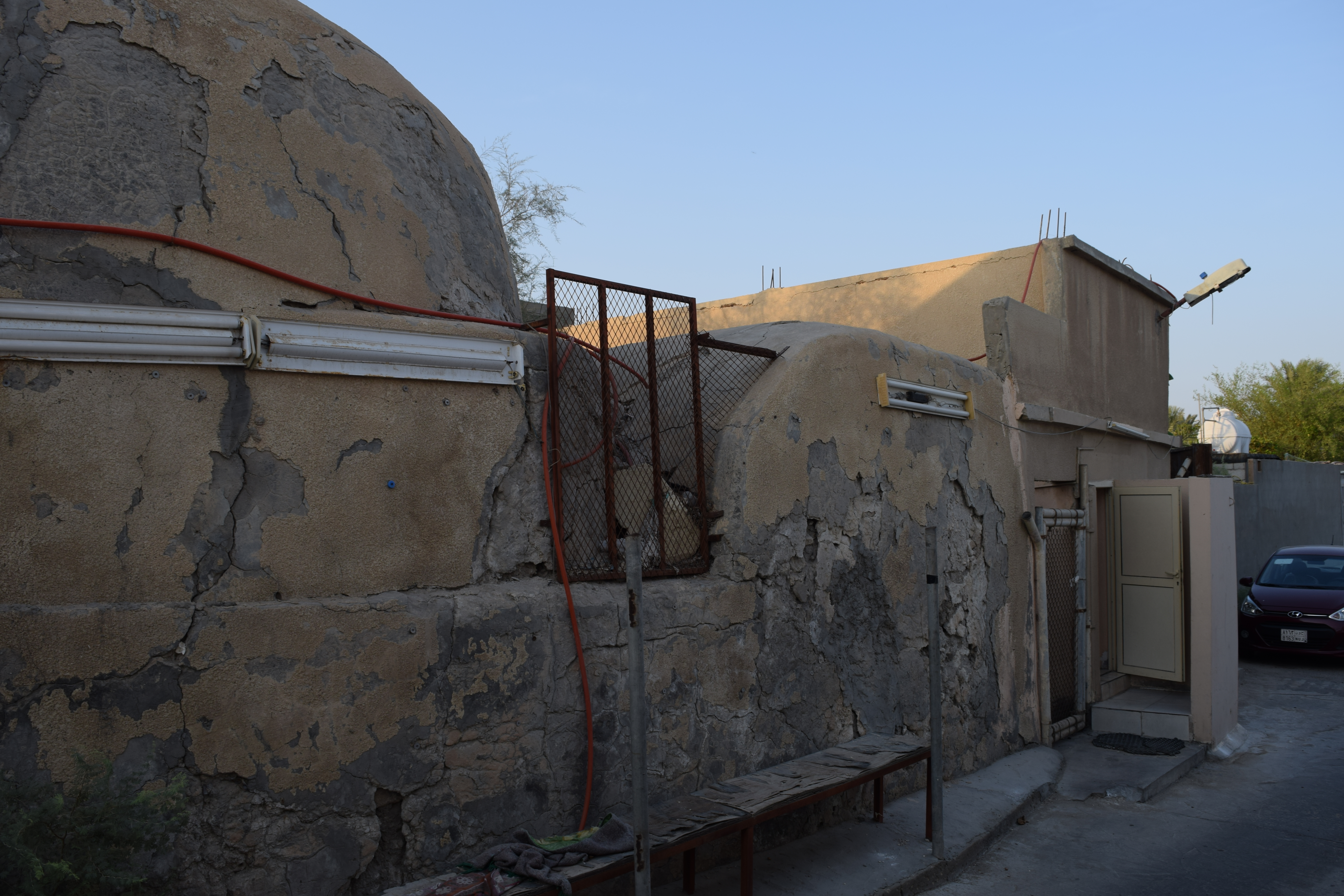
The closed entrance to Abu Loza's Bath

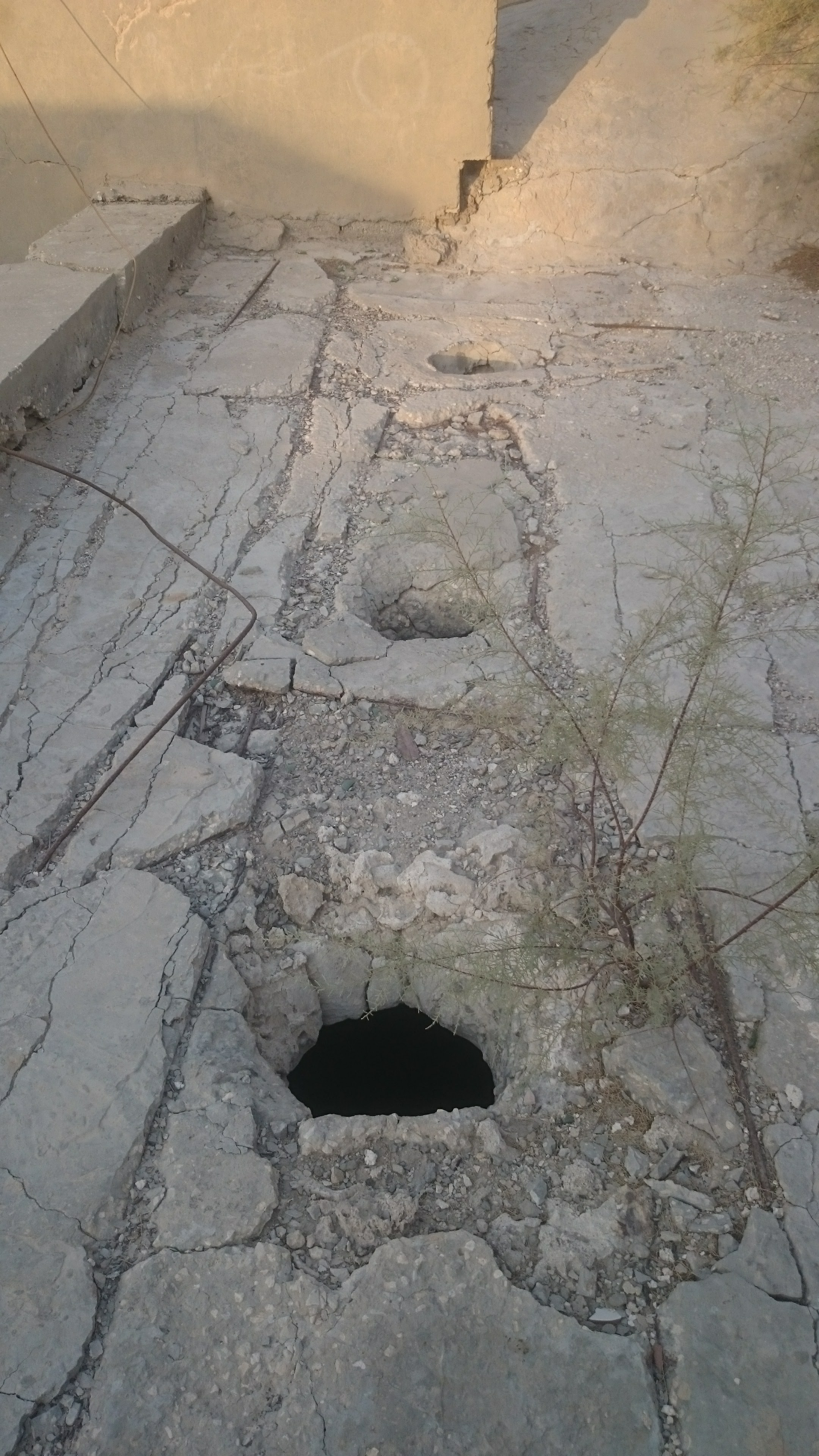
Ventilation and lighting vents as seen from the upper bath ceiling

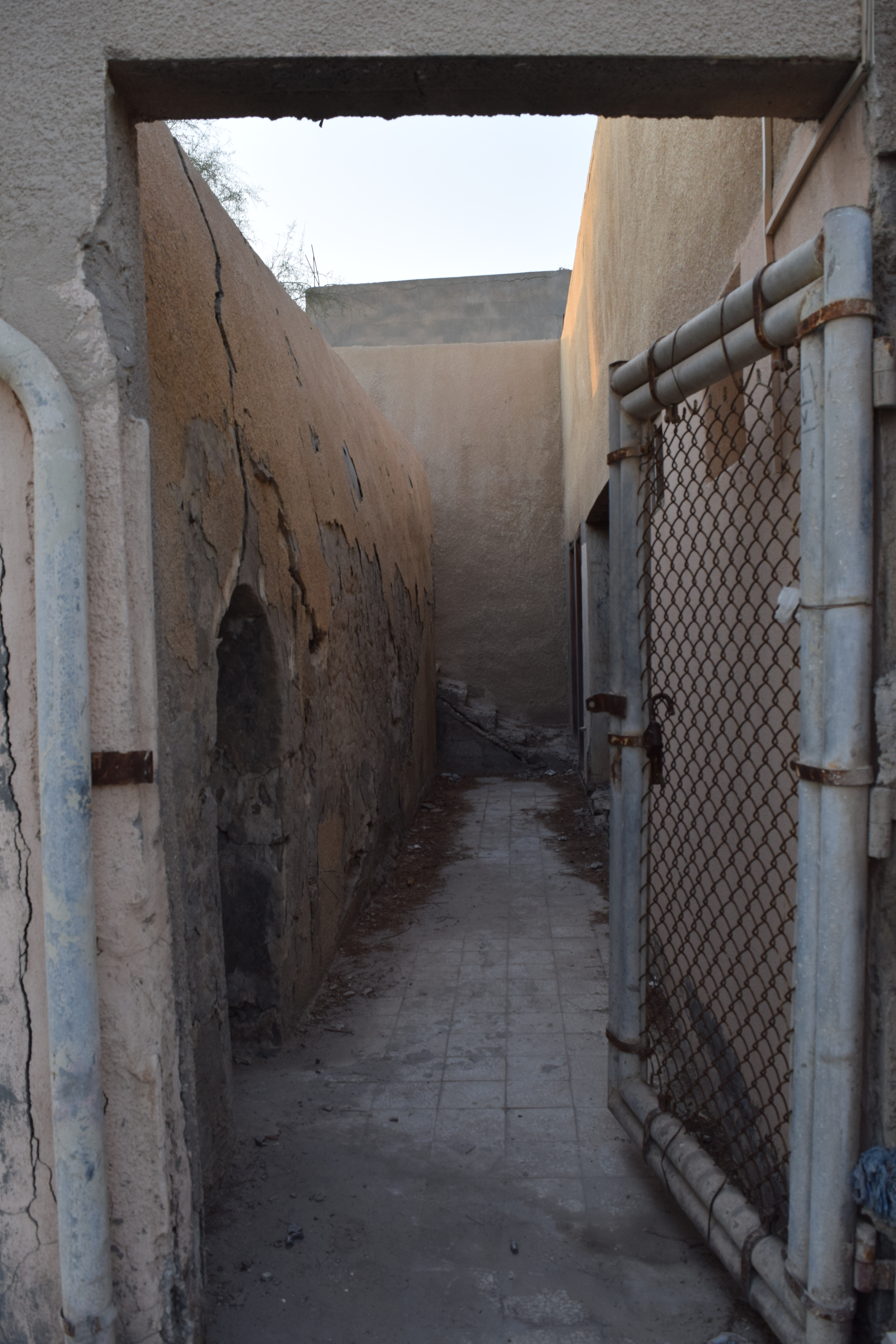
The entrance to Abu Loza's bath

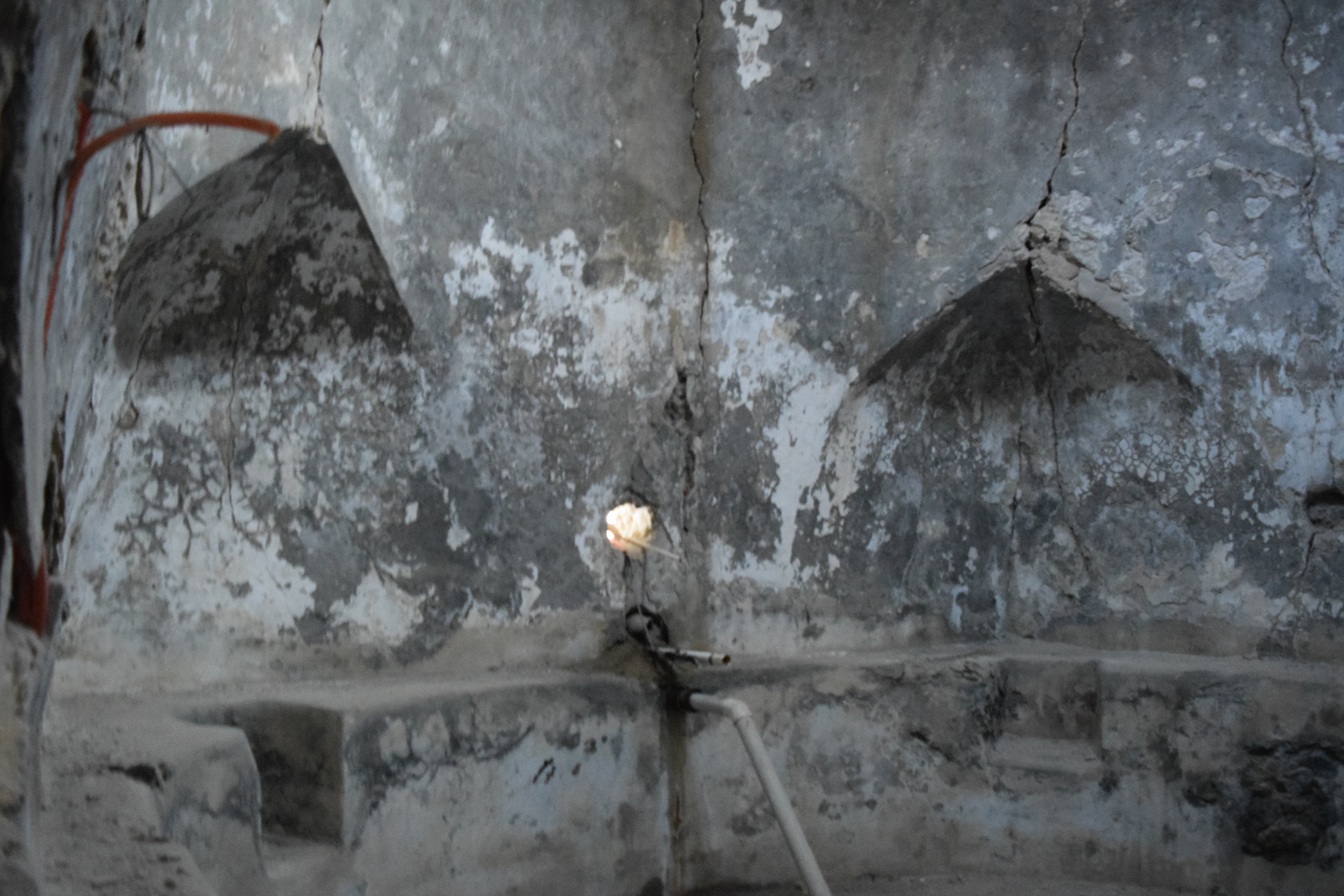
Recliners and balances inside the bath

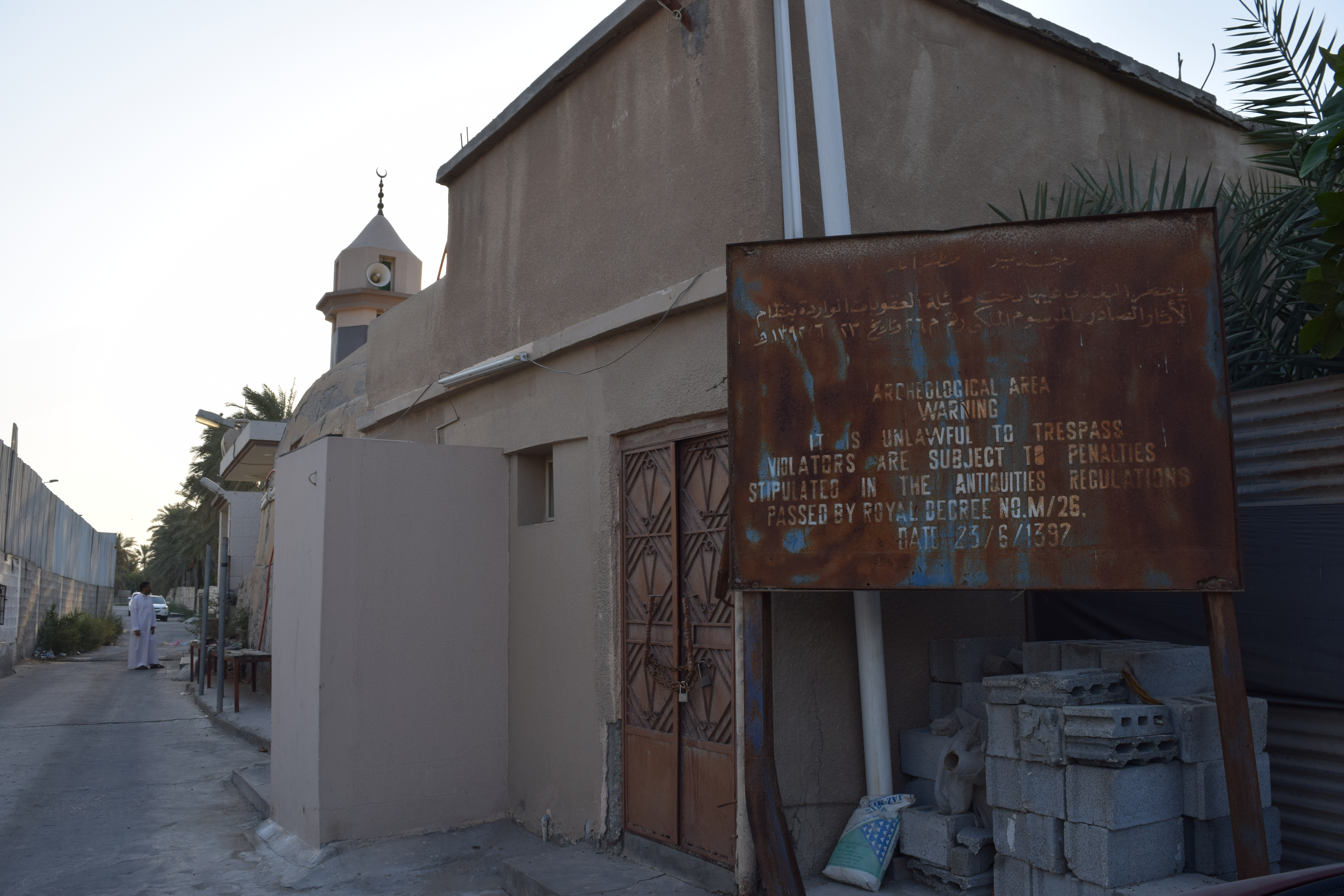
One of the bath's annexes next to a signboard whose writing has faded

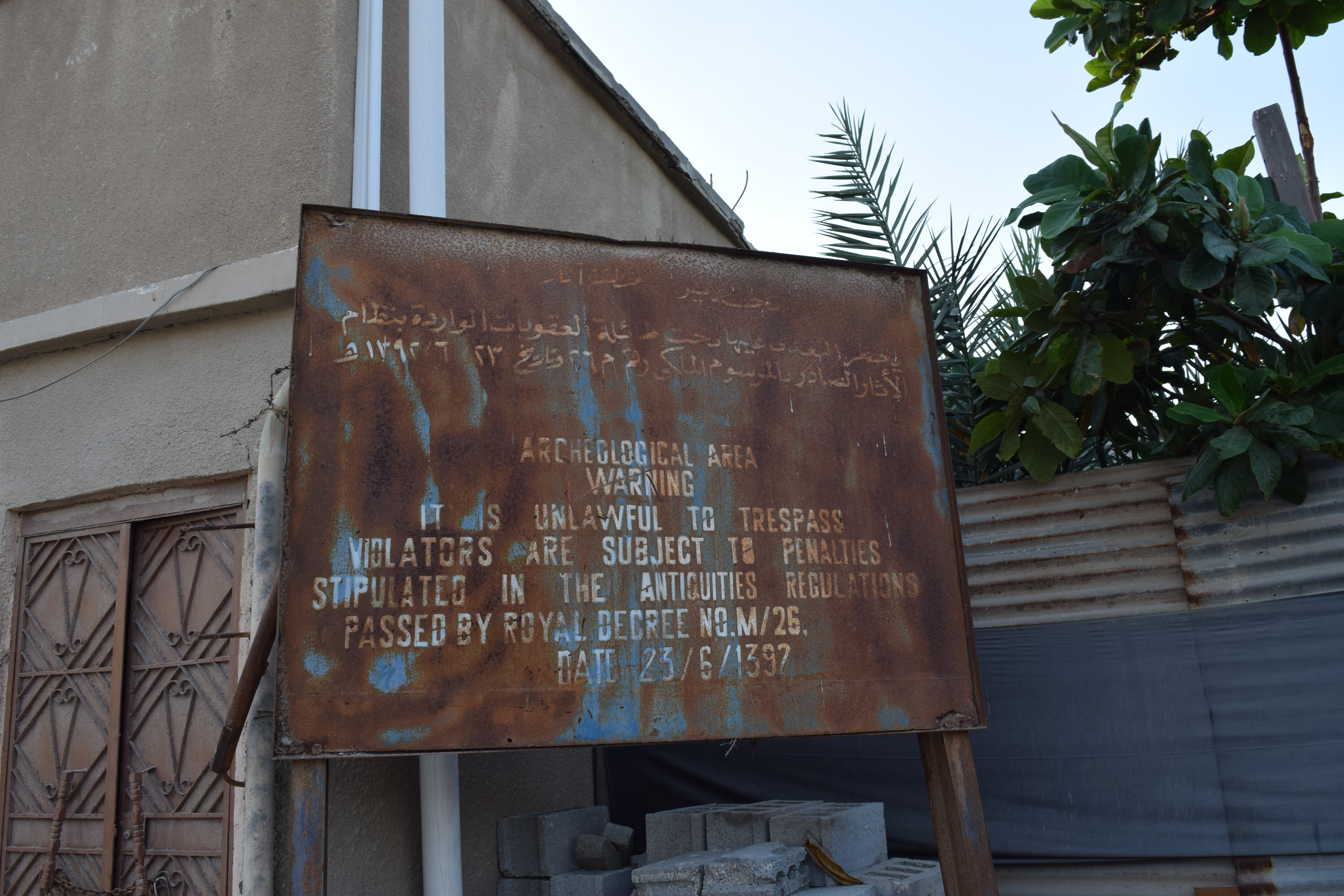
A signboard erected in the 1980s. The writing and markings have faded.

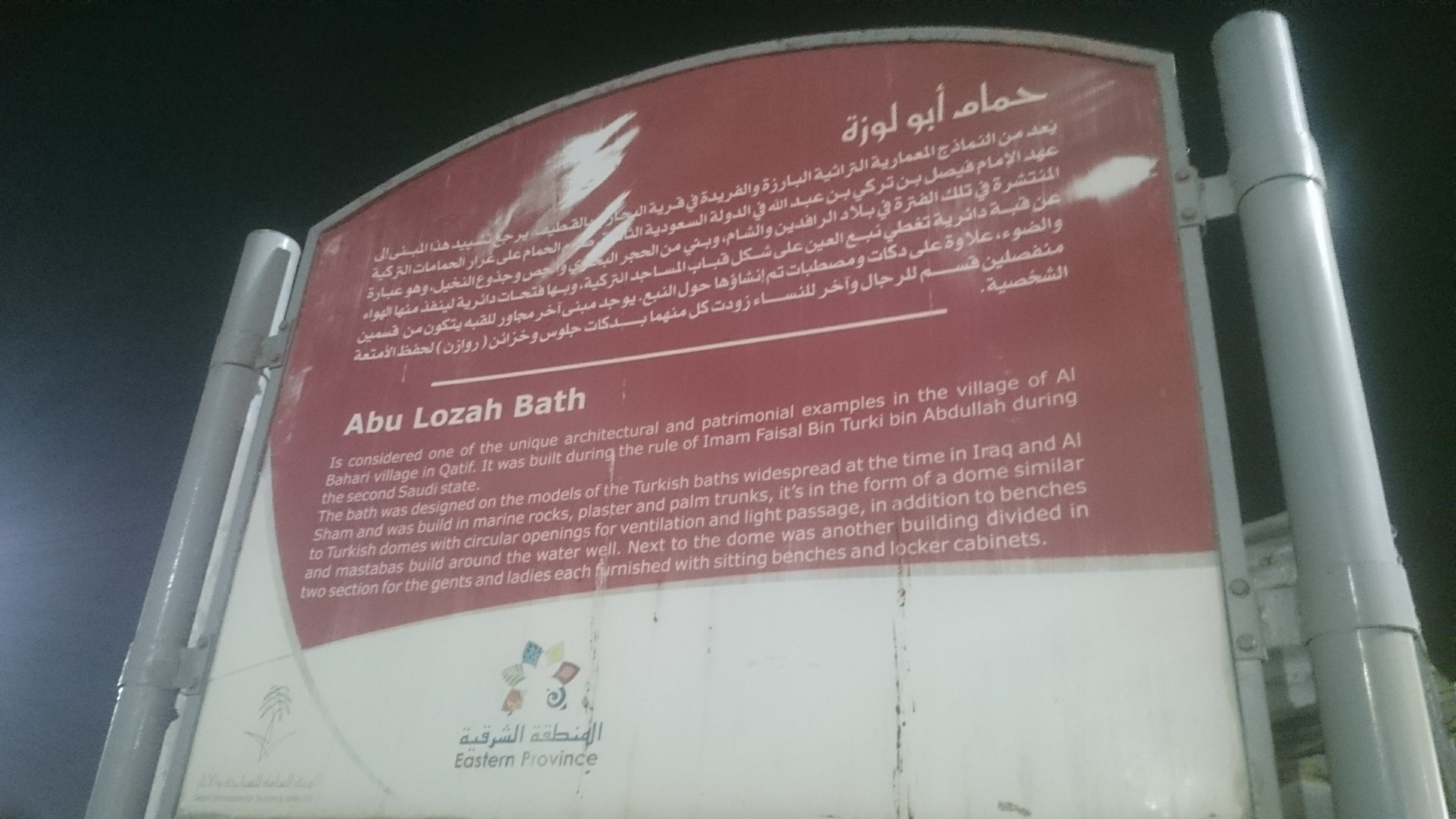
Illustrative panel

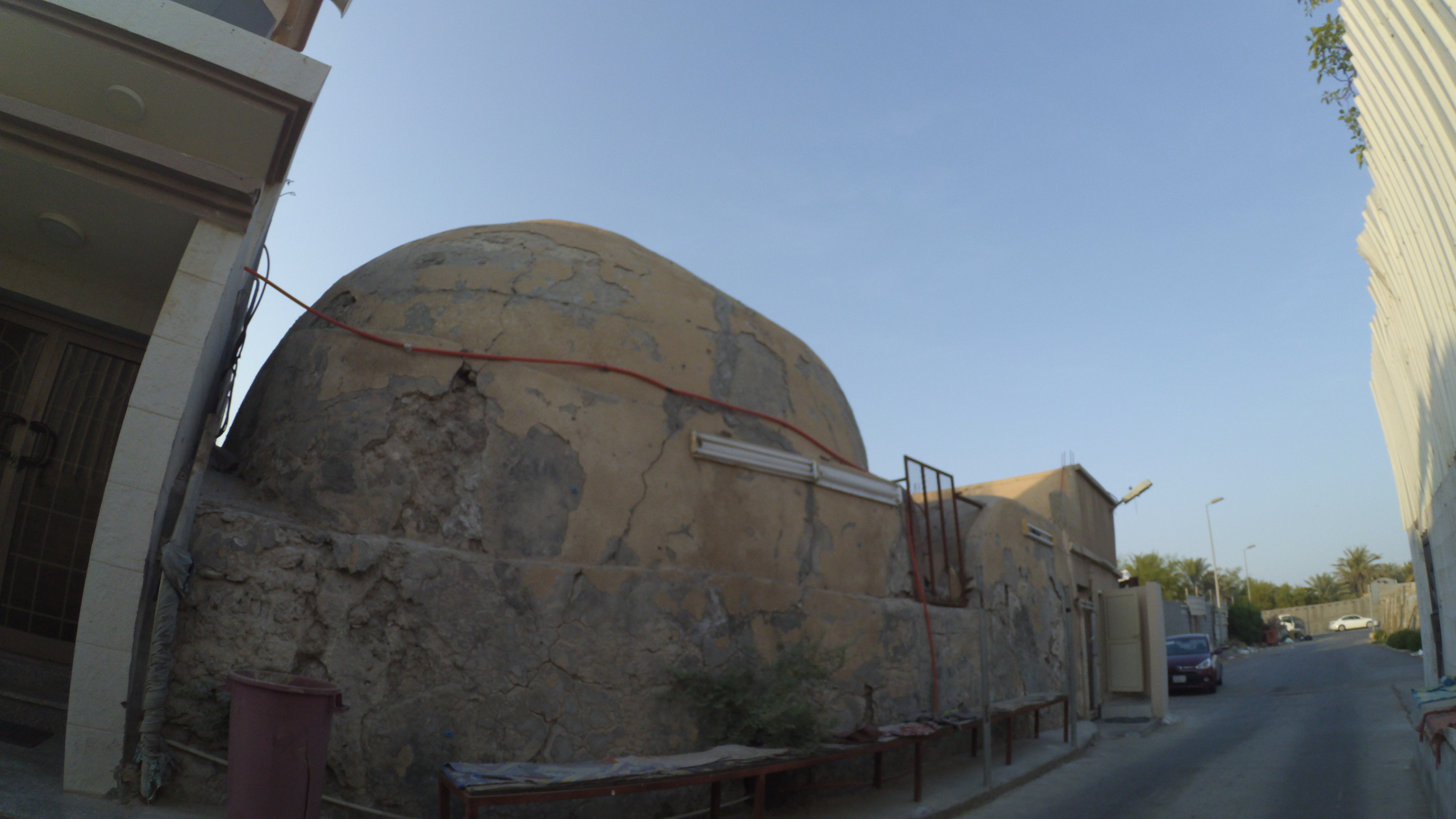
Prevalence of cracks on Abu Loza's Bath's walls

== See also ==
- Qal'at al-Qatif
- Terminalia catappa
