= Saudi Heritage Preservation Society =

International non-governmental organization in safeguarding heritage

Charitable society overview
- Formed: 17 May 2010
- Headquarters: Riyadh, Saudi Arabia
- Charitable society executive: Badr bin Farhan, Chairman of the board of directors
- Website: http://shps.org.sa/Pages/default.aspx

The Saudi Heritage Preservation Society (SHPS) is a Saudi charitable society established on 17 May 2010 and concerned with the preservation of national heritage where the constituent meeting was held in the National Museum of Saudi Arabia. It has been registered by UNESCO as an international nongovernmental organization in safeguarding heritage.

On 12 July 2019, UNESCO signed a letter with the Saudi Minister of Culture of In which Saudi Arabia contribute US$25 million to UNESCO for the preservation of heritage.

== Society activities ==
In 2013, the society launched several projects emphasizing on protecting and documenting archaeological sites and old buildings. Moreover, the projects involve initiatives towards sculptures and skills associated with traditional arts and crafts through launching awareness campaigns and seasonal competitions.

== Elements and properties inscribed on UNESCO ==
There are six elements inscribed on UNESCO's Intangible Cultural Heritage of Humanity list and five properties inscribed in the World Heritage List.

Elements inscribed on the Representative List of the Intangible Cultural Heritage of Humanity:

- 2017: Al-Qatt Al-Asiri, female traditional interior wall decoration in Asir, Saudi Arabia.
- 2016: Almezmar, drumming and dancing with sticks
- 2016: Falconry, a living human heritage
- 2015: Arabic coffee, a symbol of generosity
- 2015: Majlis, a cultural and social space
- 2015: Alardah Alnajdiyah, dance, drumming and poetry in Saudi Arabia

Properties inscribed on the UNESCO World Heritage Site:

- 2018: Al-Ahsa Oasis, an Evolving Cultural Landscape
- 2008: Al-Hijr Archaeological Site (Madâin Sâlih)
- 2010: At-Turaif District in ad-Dir'iyah
- 2014: Historic Jeddah, the Gate to Makkah
- 2015: Rock Art in the Hail Region of Saudi Arabia

== See also ==
- List of Intangible Cultural Heritage elements in Saudi Arabia
- List of World Heritage Sites in Saudi Arabia
