= List of Intangible Cultural Heritage elements in Saudi Arabia =

The United Nations Educational, Scientific and Cultural Organisation (UNESCO) intangible cultural heritage elements are the non-physical traditions and practices performed by a people. As part of a country's cultural heritage, they include celebrations, festivals, performances, oral traditions, music, and the making of handicrafts. The "intangible cultural heritage" is defined by the Convention for the Safeguarding of Intangible Cultural Heritage, drafted in 2003 and took effect in 2006. Inscription of new heritage elements on the UNESCO Intangible Cultural Heritage Lists is determined by the Intergovernmental Committee for the Safeguarding of Intangible Cultural Heritage, an organisation established by the convention.

Saudi Arabia ratified the convention on 10 January 2008. Seventeen elements have been inscribed on the Representative List since then.

== Intangible Cultural Heritage of Humanity ==
+ Transnational element

=== Representative List ===
| Name | Image | No. | Year | Description |
|---|---|---|---|---|
| Majlis, a cultural and social space + (Note: Shared with Oman, Qatar, and United Arab Emirates.) | | 01076 | 2015 | It was Inserted within the world non-materialistic tradition list in Saudi Arabia under "Majlis, a cultural and social space" title, by sharing with neighboring countries, in the year 2015. And the council is a meeting place for society’s individuals to debate matters and local issues, and exchanging news whether public affairs news or what concern the council attendee. Therefore, it is a place for social communication. The council consider to be a place for performing social duties as having guests, offering the duty of condolence and giving wedding parties. The council’s floor usually covered with carpet and it is a place with wide area and it has cushions, mitkaat and a fire for making coffee. The elderly in particular cares for this heritage due to their knowledge of lineage, tribal history and nature. However, those who went the council they could be from the same family or the tribe or the neighborhood or the next neighborhood. The judges and clergy men cares for councils because it is a place for resolving conflicts and clarifying political, religious and social rights. Councils is not only for men, women also have their own councils and the prominent women could attend mixed literary or scientific councils. The importance of the councils comes from that it is a place for transferring the oral heritage such as popular or heritage stories, traditional singing and napati poetry. This heritage transfers knowledge that is shown in it to all age groups so the children learn from what is said in the council and throw watching the adults in the council the children and young people learn their community’s behaviors and ethics, dialogues skills and respecting other peoples’ opinions. |
| Arabic coffee, a symbol of generosity + (Note: Shared with Oman, Qatar, Jordan, and United Arab Emirates.) | | 02111 | 2015 | It was Inserted within the world non-materialistic heritage list in Saudi Arabia under the "Arabic coffee is a symbol of generosity" title, by sharing with neighboring countries, in the year 2015. Making coffee starts by roasting coffee beans in a flat pan and then grind it by using copper pestle and mortar after that it will be put in a copper pot “dallah” on fire stove. And after brewing it will be poured into a small cup till it is full to its quarter and first it served for the oldest and most important guest, and pouring again upon request by shaking the cup and usually no more than three cups are drunk. This tradition is practiced by all groups and segments of society, nevertheless its holders and who are preserving its consistency are sheiks, heads of the tribes, Bedouins of men and old women, and shop owners specializing in selling coffee. They are keen to convey the traditions of Arabic coffee within the family through practice and observation, and young people learn the method of choosing the right coffee beans by accompanying the adults to the market. |
| Alardah Alnajdiyah, dance, drumming and poetry in Saudi Arabia | | 01196 | 2015 | It was Inserted within the world non-materialistic heritage list in Saudi Arabia under the title "Al Ardah Alnajdiyah traditional dance, drumming and traditional odes from Saudi Arabia". It is also called Saudi's Ardah and consider as a traditional dance that started as one of wars lyrics but it became performed during times of celebration and Eids, and it has in it a certain poetic verses and chants which are repeated followed by the dance which swords are usually being used in it with certain moves. In addition, different types of drums are used, in which the performers of Al Ardah wear a special costume. |
| Almezmar, drumming and dancing with sticks | | 01011 | 2016 | It was Inserted within the world non-materialistic heritage list in Saudi Arabia under "the Almezmar, drumming and dancing with sticks" title. A dance performed by using sticks to ring drums in the Kingdom of Saudi Arabia in the year 2016. Almezmar dance consider as one of the traditional dances in Hijaz and is often practiced in family and national occasions, where about 15 to 100 men lined up in opposite rows clapping and chanting specific songs, also two men dance with sticks to the beat of the drums in the middle of the dance floor for a specified period and then they make way for others. |
| Falconry, a living human heritage + (Note: Shared with Austria, Belgium, Croatia, Czechia, France, Germany, Hungary, Ireland, Italy, Kazakhstan, Republic of Korea, Kyrgyzstan, Mongolia, Morocco, Netherlands, Pakistan, Poland, Portugal, Qatar, Slovakia, Spain, Syria, and United Arab Emirates.) | | 01708 | 2016 | It was Inserted within the world nonmaterialistic heritage list under "Albizarah a living human heritage" title in the year 2016. The Falconry hobby is (raising falcons and hunting with it) it is an ancient hobby in the region of the Arabian peninsula and a number of other Arab countries. And its classified into the world nonmaterialistic heritage in Saudi Arabia in share with many countries that know the practice of this hobby within its national heritage. The origin of this hobby goes back to the use of hunting by birds of prey as a mean of hunting but it has evolved over time to become part of the cultural heritage of the people. The practitioners of this hobby raise the birds of prey such as hawks, eagles, falcons and others, also they Release them and work on their breeding. The practitioners of hunting by birds of prey see themselves as a group and they may travel for weeks in each time to practice this art, and they gather together in the evenings to tell what they did and saw during the daytime. Furthermore, it is not allowed in some countries to hunt by bird of prey and to acquire characteristic of a hunter or practitioner in this type of hunting until passing a national exam. |
| Al-Qatt Al-Asiri, female traditional interior wall decoration in Asir, Saudi Arabia | | 01261 | 2017 | Al-Qatt, the sketching or the decoration is one of the abstract arts that arose in The Asir region, where women do it to decorate their houses, whereas different proportional geometric patterns and designs are chosen to accomplish layers upon each other’s to form in it many lines and sketches each one has its own term, and then it colored by a number of colors such as black, blue, red and yellow. |
| Date palm, knowledge, skills, traditions and practices + (Note: Shared with Bahrain, Egypt, Iraq, Jordan, Kuwait, Mauritania, Morocco, Oman, Palestine, Qatar, Sudan, Tunisia, Yemen, and United Arab Emirates.) | | 01902 | 2019 | It was inserted within the world nonmaterialistic heritage under the "Date Palm, Knowledge and Skills, Tradition and Practices" title in 2019. Also, it’s a part of the cultural heritage of the Kingdom of Saudi Arabia in partnership with other countries. The Palm tree consider to be a part of the history of these countries. Where it is a source of many farmers, craftsmen, handicrafts owners, merchants, factory owners and food companies. Palm trees grow in dry climates, while the roots of the plant penetrate deeply into the earth searching for wetness. The farmers who take care of the palm trees, craftsmen who use parts of the tree palm in their works and the storytellers who tell folklore stories and poems that are associated with this tree. The nutritional, professional and commercial benefits that date and palm provided to the inhabitants of these countries over time have contributed to reinforce their connection with it, which has made it part of their civilized heritage. |
| Traditional weaving of Al Sadu + (Note: Shared with Kuwait and Qatar.) | | 02158 | 2020 | Al Sadu, or simply Sadu, describes an embroidery form in geometrical shapes hand-woven by Bedouin people. |
| Arabic calligraphy: knowledge, skills and practices + (Note: Shared with Algeria, Bahrain, Egypt, Iraq, Jordan, Kuwait, Lebanon, Mauritania, Morocco, Oman, Palestine, Sudan, Tunisia, United Arab Emirates, and Yemen.) | | 01718 | 2021 | The artistic practice of writing Arabic letters and words to convey grace and beauty. |
| Alheda'a, oral traditions of calling camel flocks + (Note: Shared with Oman and United Arab Emirates.) | | 01717 | 2022 | Alheda'a is an oral tradition of calling a flock of camels passed on through generations. |
| Knowledge and practices related to cultivating Khawlani coffee beans | | 01863 | 2022 | Saudi Khawlani Coffee Beans are a type of coffee bean cultivated in the region of the Khawlan mountains (Sarat Khawlan). |
| Harees dish: know-how, skills and practices + (Note: Shared with Oman and United Arab Emirates.) | | 01744 | 2023 | Harees, is a dish of boiled, cracked, or coarsely-ground cracked wheat or bulgur, mixed with meat and seasoned. |
| Arts, skills and practices associated with engraving on metals (gold, silver and copper) + (Note: Shared with Algeria, Egypt, Iraq, Mauritania, Morocco, Palestine, Sudan, Tunisia, and Yemen.) | | 01951 | 2023 | Engraving on metals such as gold, silver and copper is a centuries-old practice that entails manually cutting words, symbols or patterns into the surfaces of decorative, utilitarian, religious or ceremonial objects. |
| Henna, rituals, aesthetic and social practices + (Note: Shared with Algeria, Palestine, Bahrain, Egypt, United Arab Emirates, Iraq, Jordan, Kuwait, Morocco, Mauritania, Oman, Qatar, Sudan, Tunisia, and Yemen.) | | 02116 | 2024 | A temporary tattooing practice with medicinal and aesthetic motivations. |
| Semsemiah: instrument crafting and playing + (Note: Shared with Egypt.) | | 02119 | 2024 | Semsemiah or simsimiyya is a box or bowl lyre played in the Suez Canal region. |
| Cultural practices related to Taif roses | | 02089 | 2024 | Cultural practices related to roses in the Taif region. |
| Bisht (men's Abaa): skills and practices + (Note: Shared with Bahrain, Iraq, Jordan, Kuwait, Oman, Qatar, Syria, and the United Arab Emirates.) | | 02233 | 2025 | A bisht is a traditional men's cloak popular in the Arab world for hundreds of years. |
| Arabic Kohl + (Note: Shared with Iraq, Jordan, Libya, Oman, Palestine, Syria, Tunisia, and the United Arab Emirates.) | | 02261 | 2025 | Kohl is a fine black powder used as eyeliner traditionally made by crushing stibnite. |

== See also ==
- List of World Heritage Sites in Saudi Arabia
- Saudi Heritage Preservation Society
