= Mizmar =

Mizmar (Arabic: مزمار) can refer to

- Mizmar (instrument)
- Mizmar (dance)
