= Hegra =

Archaeological site in northwest Saudi Arabia

Hegra - Madaʾin Salih
- الحجر (Arabic); مدائن صالح (Arabic)
- Location within Saudi Arabia Location within Near East
- 26°47′30″N 37°57′10″E
- Type: Settlement
- Location: Medina province, Hejaz, Saudi Arabia

UNESCO World Heritage Site
- Official name: Hegra Archaeological Site (Al-Hijr / Madâʾin Sâlih)
- Type: Cultural
- Criteria: ii, iii
- Designated: 2008 (32nd session)
- Reference no.: 1293
- Region: Arab states

Hegra (Arabic: الْحِجْر, romanized: al-Ḥijr), also known as Mada'in Salih (Arabic: مَدَائِن صَالِح, romanized: Madāʾin Ṣāliḥ, lit. 'Cities of Salih'), is an archaeological site located in the area of Al-'Ula within Medina Province in the Hejaz region, Saudi Arabia.

A majority of the remains date from the time of the Nabataean Kingdom, when the city was founded. The site constituted the kingdom's southernmost and second largest city after its capital, Petra (modern-day Jordan). Traces of Lihyanite and Roman occupation before and after the Nabataean rule, respectively, can also be found. The site features more than 110 well-preserved Nabataean tombs carved into sandstone outcrops.

The archaeological site lies in an arid environment. The dry climate, the lack of resettlement after the site was abandoned, and the prevailing local beliefs about the locality have all led to the extraordinary state of preservation of Al-Hijr, providing an extensive picture of the Nabataean lifestyle. Thought to mark the southern extent of the Nabataean kingdom, Al-Hijr's oasis agriculture and extant wells exhibit the necessary adaptations made by the Nabataeans in the given environment—its markedly distinct settlement is the second largest among the Nabataean kingdom, complementing that of the more famous Petra archaeological site in Jordan. The location of the site at the crossroads of trade, and the various languages, scripts and artistic styles reflected in the façades of its monumental tombs further set it apart from other archaeological sites. It has duly earned the nickname "The Capital of Monuments" among Saudi Arabia's 4,000 archaeological sites.

The Quran places the settlement of the area by the Thamudi people during the days of the prophet Salih, between those of Nuh (Noah) and Hud on one hand, and those of Ibrahim (Abraham) and Musa (Moses) on the other. However, a definitive historical chronology can not be obtained through the order of verses because the Quranic chapters (see surah) deal with different subjects in non-chronologic order. According to the Quran, the Thamudis were punished by God for their idolatry, struck by an earthquake and lightning blasts. Thus, the site has earned a reputation as a cursed place—an image which the national government is attempting to overcome as it seeks to develop Mada'in Salih for its potential for tourism.

In 2008, UNESCO proclaimed Mada'in Salih as a site of patrimony, becoming Saudi Arabia's first World Heritage Site. It was chosen for its well-preserved remains from late antiquity, especially the 131 monumental rock-cut tombs, with their elaborately ornamented façades, of the Nabataean Kingdom.

== Name ==
Its long history and the multitude of cultures occupying the site have produced several names. References by Strabo and other Mediterranean writers use the name Hegra (Ancient Greek: Ἔγρα) for the Nabataean site. The etymology of the name is not clear, and the Semitic root hjr can mean many things: "surround, encompass" (Aramaic); "what is defended, prohibited and illicit" or "wall, high wall" (Arabic).

Mada'in Salih, meaning "the cities of Salih", started to be used during the Ottoman period at the earliest. It refers to the Salih, one of the prophets of the Quran that was unable to convince the Thamudeans to abandon their polytheism.

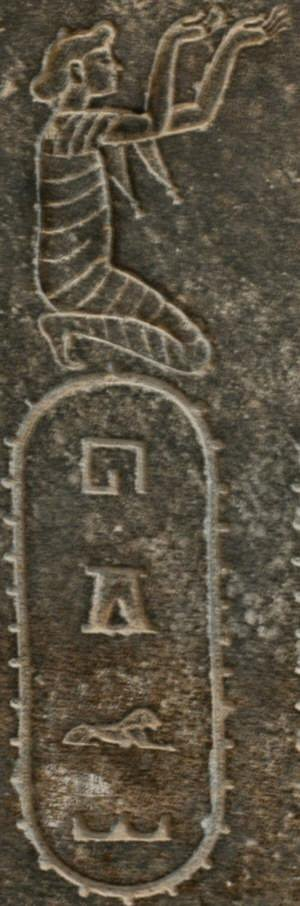
The word hgr (𓉔𓎼𓃭𓈉, Hegra) on an Egyptian-style statue of the Persian king Darius

Although Hegra was for a long time not as important as Dedan, foreigners appear to have called the oasis Hegra. For example, the famous statue of the Achaemenid king Darius the Great made in Egypt and erected in Susa calls the Arabs hgr (𓉔𓎼𓃭𓈉).

== Location and climate ==
The archaeological site of Hegra is situated 20 km (12 mi) north of the town of Al-'Ula, 400 km (250 miles) northwest of Medina, and 500 km (310 miles) southeast of Petra, Jordan. Istakhri wrote in his Routes of the Realms (مسالك الممالك):

Al-Hijr is a small village. It belongs to Wadi al Gura and is located at one day's travel inside the mountains. It was the homeland of the Thamudians. I have seen those mountains and their carvings. Their houses are similar to ours but are carved in the mountains, which are called the Ithlib mountains. It looks as if they are a continuous range but they are separated and have sand dunes around them. You can reach the top of the mountains, but this is extremely tiring. The well of the Thamudians which is mentioned in the Holy Quran is located in the middle of the mountains.

The site is on an inland plain at the foot of Jabal al-Uwayrid, basalt plateau that forms a portion of the Hijaz Mountains in the eastern Hijaz. Beneath the western and northwestern parts of the site, the water table can be reached at a depth of 20 metres (66 ft). The landscape is characterized by isolated Palaeozoic sandstone outcrops shaped by intense erosion during the late Miocene. These sandstones can range from reddish-brown Cambrian layers to lighter Ordovician formations; their fine grain made them well suited to rock carving, though their resistance to erosion varies, with some strata heavily affected by wind erosion and salt crystallization. The sandstone outcroppings of the desert landscape can vary greatly in size and height.

The climate is extremely arid, with average annual rainfall below 50 mm. Despite this, the site occupies a favorable hydrological position within a natural drainage gully that collects runoff from surrounding massifs. This runoff recharged shallow groundwater, which in antiquity lay less than 10 m below the surface. Exploiting these conditions, the Nabataeans developed an oasis sustained primarily by numerous deep wells rather than by surface channels, enabling irrigated agriculture and supporting both the local population and travelers through the region.

== History ==
=== Rock writings ===
Recent archaeological work has revealed numerous rock writings and pictures not only on Mount Athleb, but also throughout central Arabia. They date between the sixth century BC and the fourth century AD and are labelled as being Thamudic, a name invented by nineteenth-century scholars for these large numbers of inscriptions which had not yet been properly studied.

=== Lihyan/Dedanite era ===
Archaeological traces of cave art on the sandstones and epigraphs (inscriptions), considered by experts to be Lihyanite script, on top of the Athleb Mountain, near Hegra (Madaʾin Salih), have been dated to the 3rd–2nd century BC, indicating the early human settlement of the area, which has an accessible source of freshwater and fertile soil. The settlement of the Lihyans became a centre of commerce, with goods from the east, north and south converging in the locality.

=== Nabataean era ===
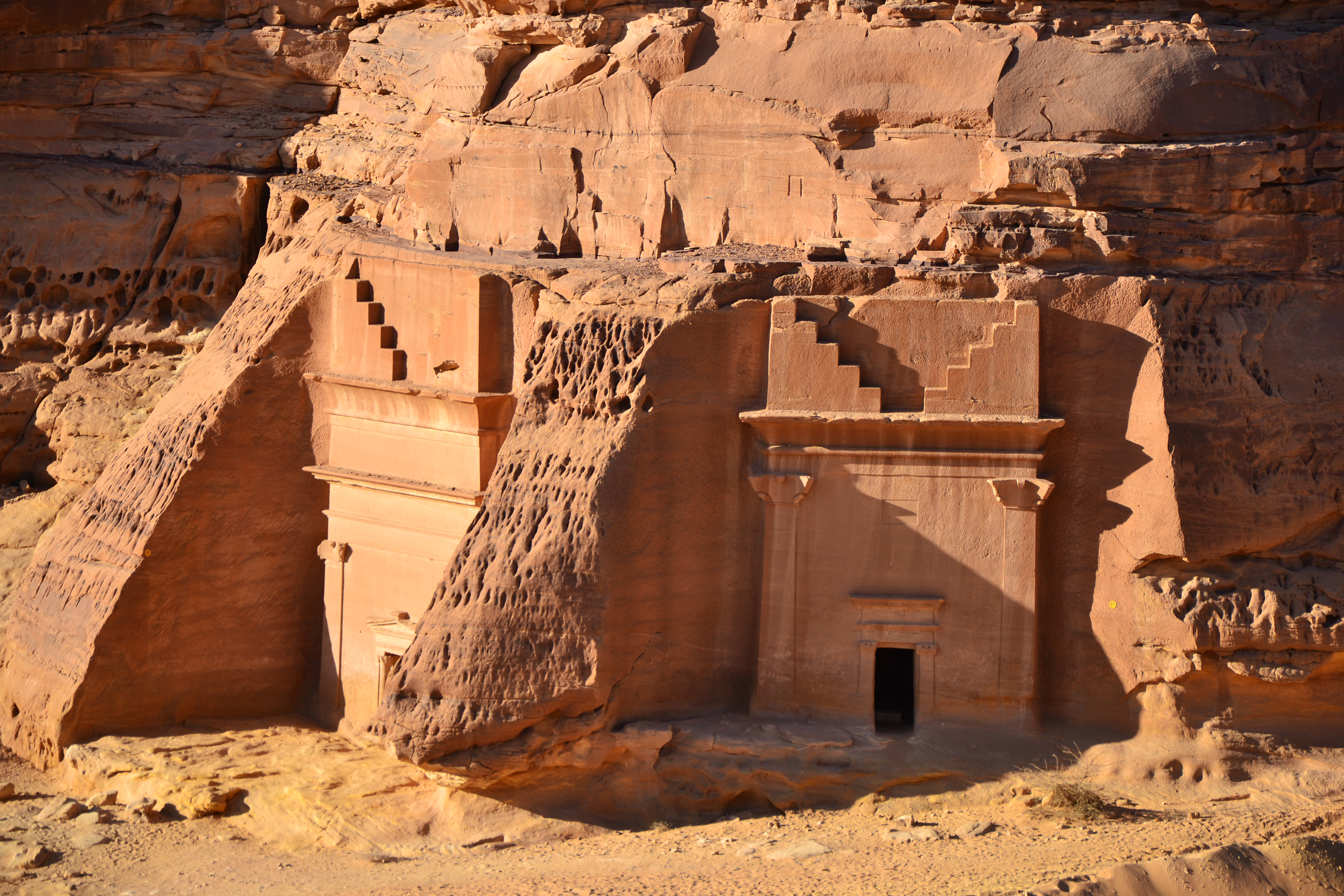
Multiple Nabataean Tombs in Hegra (Madain Saleh)

The extensive settlement of the site took place during the 1st century AD, when it came under the rule of the Nabataean king Aretas IV Philopatris (Al-Harith IV) (9 BC – 40 AD), who made Hegra (Madaʾin Salih) the kingdom's second capital, after Petra in the north. The place enjoyed a huge urbanization movement, turning it into a city. Characteristic of Nabateaan rock-cut architecture, the geology of Hegra (Madaʾin Salih) provided the perfect medium for the carving of monumental structures, with Nabataean scripts inscribed on their façades.

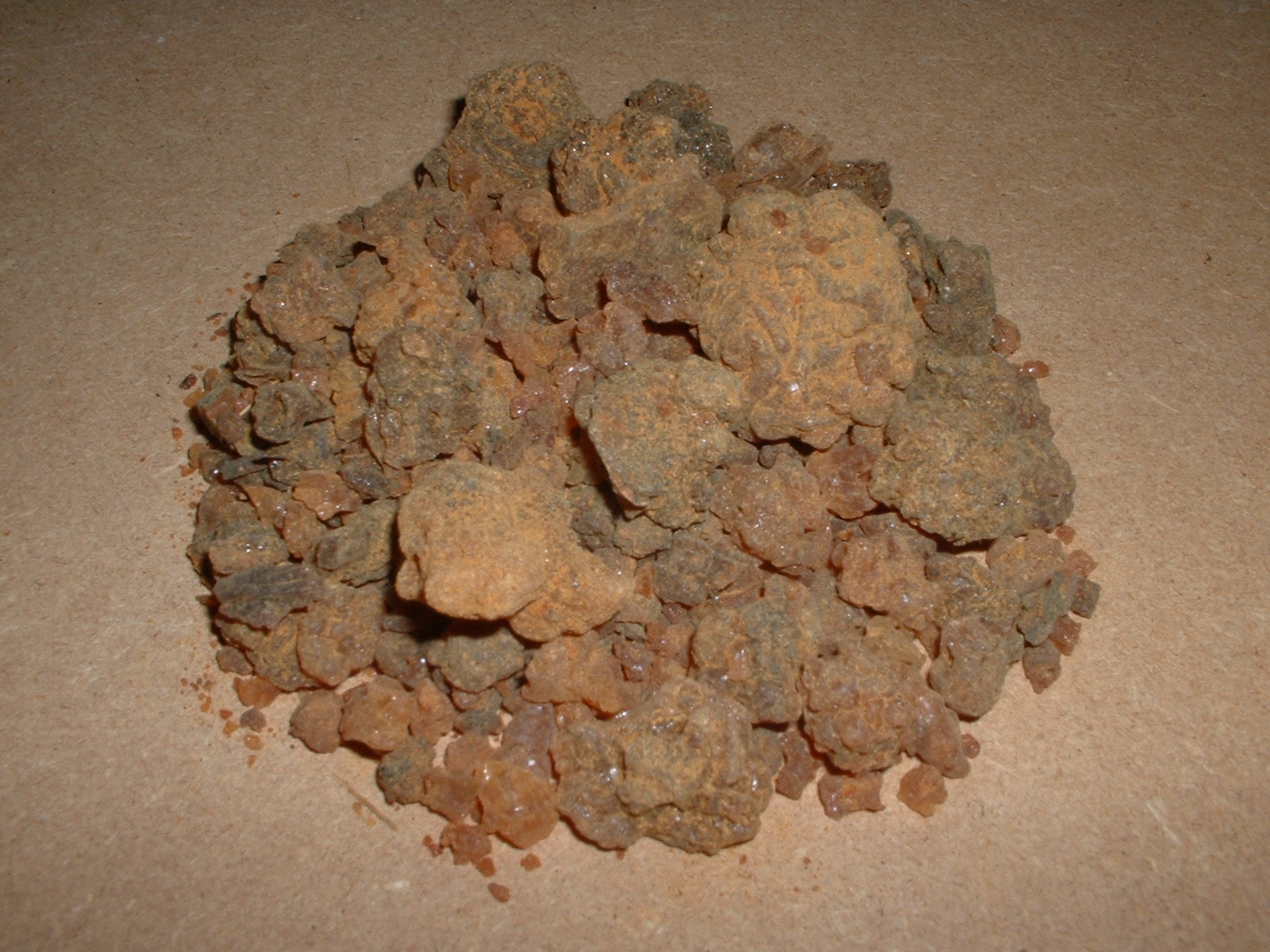
Myrrh was one of the luxury items that had to pass through the Nabataean territory to be traded elsewhere

The Nabataeans also developed oasis agriculture—digging wells and rainwater tanks in the rock and carving places of worship in the sandstone outcroppings. Similar structures were featured in other Nabataean settlements, ranging from southern Syria (region) to the north, going south to the Negev, and down to the immediate area of the Hejaz. The most prominent and the largest of these is Petra. The well and irrigation system allowed for the cultivation of date palms, wheat, barley, olives, pomegranates, figs, lentils, peas, and alfalfa, and possibly also cotton.

At the crossroad of commerce, the Nabataean kingdom flourished, holding a monopoly for the trade of incense, myrrh and spices. Situated on the overland caravan route and connected to the Red Sea port of Egra Kome, Hegra, as it was known among the Nabataeans, reached its peak as the major staging post on the main north–south trade route.

=== Roman era ===
In 106 AD, the Nabataean kingdom was annexed by the contemporary Roman Empire during the reign of the emperor Trajan. Hegra, which is part of the Hejaz, became part of the Roman province of Arabia.

The Hedjaz region was integrated into the Roman province of Arabia in 106 AD. A monumental Roman epigraph of 175–177 AD was recently discovered at al-Hijr (then called "Hijr" and now Mada'in Salih).

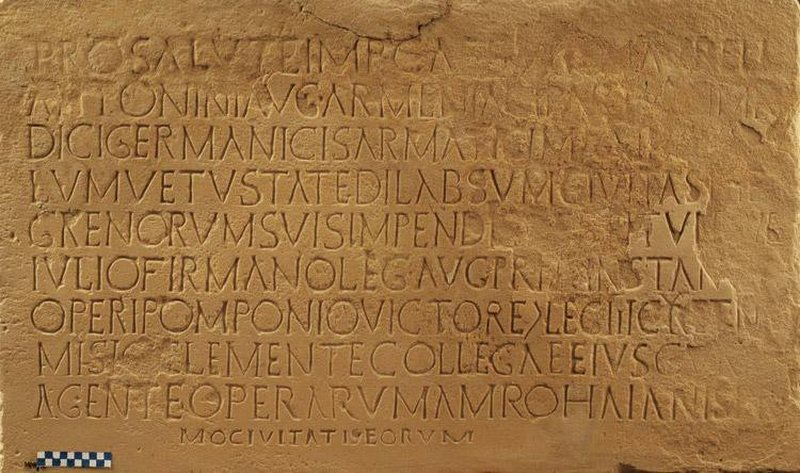
Hegra Roman inscription dedicated to Emperor Marcus Aurelius, 175–177 AD

Unfortunately, and unlike other major ex-Nabataean sites like Petra and Bostra, there is no historical information recorded about Hegra in the Roman period. Everything known about the place comes exclusively from archaeological excavations. Over 30 inscriptions, written in Nabataean, Greek, and Latin have been found from this period. No Nabataean, Greek, or Latin inscriptions are generally found south of Hegra, making it something of a candidate for the southern terminus of how far the Roman occupation of the Arabian Peninsula extended.

In the Roman era, Hegra continued as a provincial centre, and a 175–177 AD Latin inscription calls it the civitas Hegrenorum, indicating its civic status. Furthermore, it was in this time that that the city saw an influx of traders and artisans, a sizable expansion of its Eastern Mediterranean imports, and a spike in local food production, trends that are partly associated with the Roman troops stationed at Hegra. The main sanctuary was upgraded, and the southeastern gate was re-built in the late second or early third century.

According to the inscriptions found, the main Roman army unit stationed at Hegra was from the legion called Legio III Cyrenaica (Third Cyrenaican Legion), units of which participated in the original annexation of Nabataea. Soldiers from a few other legions were also stationed in Hegra. The Romans there built a citadel fortification, and this fort acted as the headquarters of the local Roman troops. The Roman army abandoned Hegra by the late second or early third century, and civilian occupation section of the fort abandoned by the fourth century. The civilian population of Hegra as a whole persisted into the sixth century at minimum.

In the early sixth century, Hegra may have re-entered the Roman orbit: Justinian I, to counter the encroachment of the Sasanian Empire, pressed hard to expand his sway over the Arabian Peninsula by establishing a series of client states throughout it. Justinian is said to have been given rule over the "Palm Grove" (either Hegra or Tayma) by its leader Abu Karib ibn Jabalah, who Justinian in turn made phylarch over the region. In addition, a bowl decorated with a lion has been found at Hegra, with an artistic style typical of the late Roman Byzantine period, most likely the sixth century, suggesting long-distance trade with the Byzantine realm at this time.

By the end of the Roman era, Hegra began to lose its status as a centre of trade, leading to its eventual abandonment. This was because the trading itinerary that once passed through Hegra changed from the overland north–south axis on the Arabian Peninsula to the maritime route through the Red Sea. Many experts, based on archaeological studies, believe that the site lost all urban functions by the beginning of late antiquity, mainly due to desertification.

=== Early Islamic period ===
The early Islamic period of Hegra is very poorly documented. Only a few pottery sherds and Arabic inscriptions are known so far.

=== Medieval Islamic era ===
Hegra served as a station along the Hajj route in the Islamic period, providing supplies and water for pilgrims. The Arab traveller Al-Maqdisi, in the 10th century, noted that the site was a small oasis and activity focused on its wells. Al-Maqdisi is the only account, between the 4th and 19th centuries, to note human activity in the area. The 14th-century traveller Ibn Battuta noted the red stone-cut tombs of Hegra, by then known as "al-Hijr", but made no mention of human activity.

=== Ottoman era ===
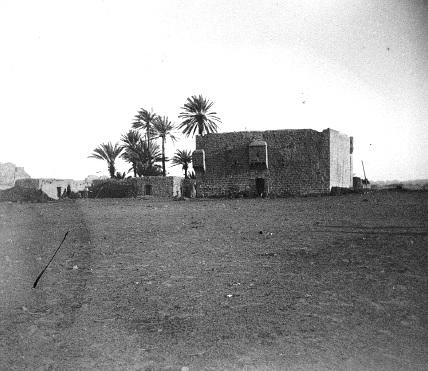
The Ottoman Hajj Fort at Mada'in Salih, 1907

The Ottoman Empire annexed western Arabia from the Mamluks by 1517. In early Ottoman accounts of the Hajj road between Damascus and Mecca, Hegra (Madaʾin Salih) is not mentioned, until 1672, when the Turkish traveller, Evliya Celebi noted that the caravan passed through a place called "Abyar Salih" where there were the remains of seven cities. It is again mentioned by the traveller Murtada ibn 'Alawan as a rest stop on the route called "al-Mada'in". Between 1744 and 1757, a fort was built at al-Hijr on the orders of the Ottoman governor of Damascus, As'ad Pasha al-Azm. A cistern supplied by a large well within the fort was also built, and the site served as a one-day stop for Hajj pilgrims where they could purchase goods such as dates, lemons and oranges. It was part of a series of fortifications built to protect the pilgrimage route to Mecca.

According to the researches of Al-Ansari, the Ottoman castle was found near the settlement dating to the year 1600 AD in 1984.

=== 19th century ===
Map of the Hejaz Railway that passed through Mada'in Salih

In 1812, Swiss explorer Johann Ludwig Burckhardt rediscovered Petra for the Western world. In the aftermath of the news making the rounds, Charles Montagu Doughty, an English traveller, heard of a similar site near Hegra (Madaʾin Salih), a fortified Ottoman town on the Hajj road from Damascus. To access the site, Doughty joined the Hajj caravan, and reached the site of the ruins in 1876, recording the visit in his journal which was published as Travels in Arabia Deserta. Doughty described the Ottoman fort, where he resided for two months, and noted that Bedouin tribesmen had a permanent encampment just outside of the building.

In the 19th century, there were accounts that the extant wells and oasis agriculture of al-Hijr were being periodically used by settlers from the nearby village of Tayma. This continued until the 20th century, when the Hejaz Railway that passed through the site was constructed (1901–08) on the orders of Ottoman Sultan Abdul Hamid II to link Damascus and Jerusalem in the north-west with Medina and Mecca, hence facilitating the pilgrimage journey to the latter and to politically and economically consolidate the Ottoman administration of the centres of Islamic faith. A station was built north of al-Hijr for the maintenance of locomotives, and offices and dormitories for railroad staff. The railway provided greater accessibility to the site. However, this was destroyed in a local revolt during World War I. Despite this, several archaeological investigations continued to be conducted in the site beginning in the World War I period to the establishment of the Kingdom of Saudi Arabia in the 1930s up to the 1960s. The former railway station, restored and redeveloped, has been transformed into the Chedi Hegra Resort, opened in 2024. The project incorporates the historic station within the hotel complex, designed by the Milan-based architecture firm Giò Forma in collaboration with Black Engineering, and operated by General Hotel Management Ltd. (GHM) under its luxury brand The Chedi.

By the end of the 1960s, the Saudi Arabian government devised a program to introduce a sedentary lifestyle to the nomadic Bedouin tribes inhabiting the area. It was proposed that they settle down in al-Hijr, re-using the already existent wells and agricultural features of the site. However, the official identification of al-Hijr as an archaeological site in 1972 led to the resettlement of the Bedouins towards the north, beyond the site boundary. This also included the development of new agricultural land and freshly dug wells, thereby preserving the state of al-Hijr.

=== Recent developments ===
In 1962, examples of many inscriptions were discovered and renewed the archaeological assessment of Hijr (Madaʾin Salih) by Winnett and Reed. Although the Al-Hijr site was proclaimed as an archaeological treasure in the early 1970s, few investigations had been conducted since. Healey studied here in 1985 and wrote a book about the inscriptions of Hijr (Madaʾin Salih) in 1993.

The prohibition on the veneration of objects/artifacts has resulted in minimal archaeological activities. These conservative measures started to ease up beginning in 2000, when Saudi Arabia invited expeditions to carry out archaeological explorations as part of the government's push to promote cultural heritage protection and tourism. The archaeological site was proclaimed as a UNESCO World Heritage Site in 2008. More recent archaeological studies of the area have been made as part of efforts to document and preserve the heritage sites prior to opening the area to more tourism.

=== Architecture ===
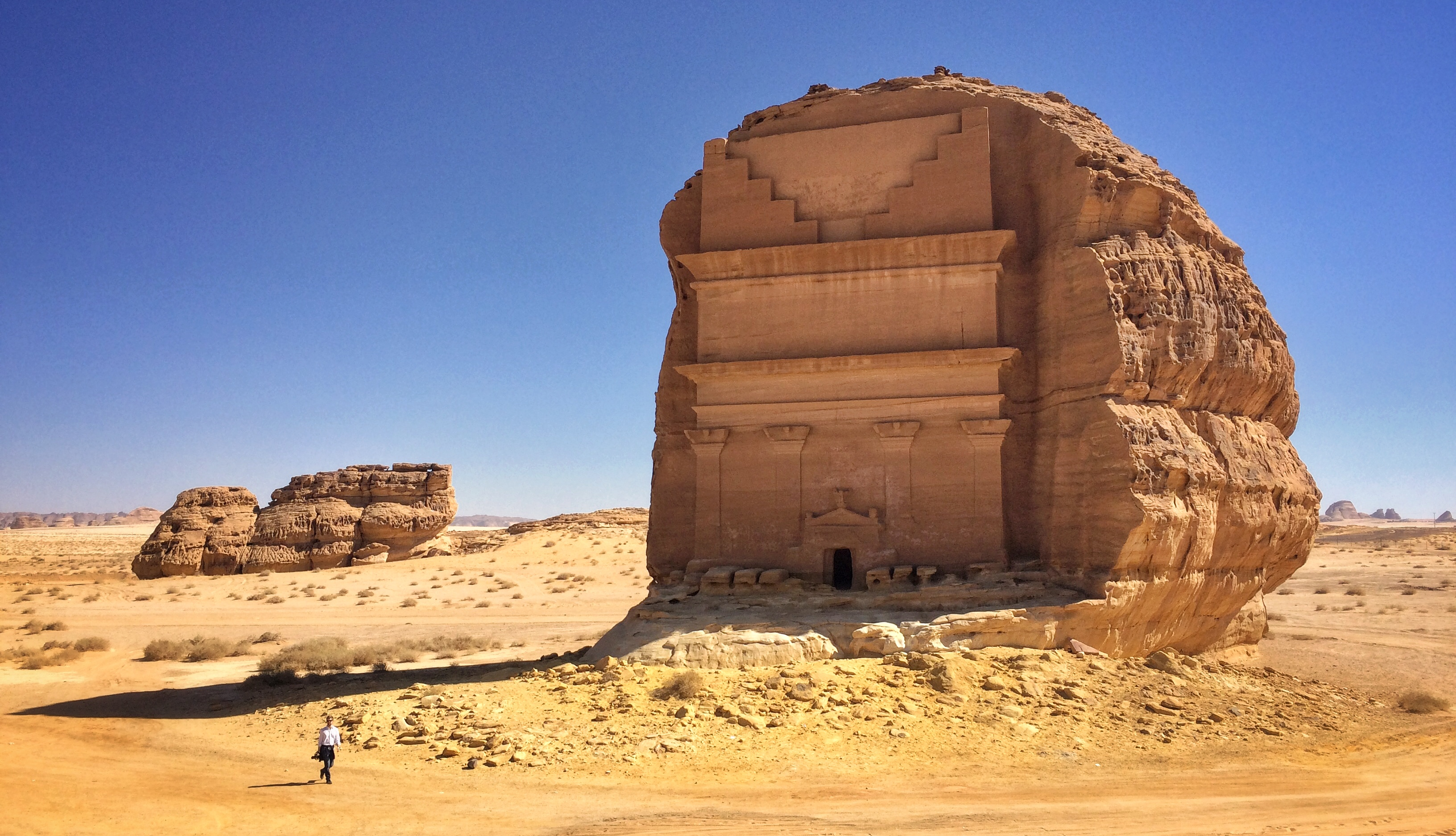
Qaṣr al-Farīd (Arabic: قَصْر ٱلْفَرِيْد, lit. 'the Lonely Castle') in Mada'in Salih is the largest tomb at the archaeological site. The archaeological vestiges of Mada'in Salih (above) are related to those of Petra (below), the Nabataean capital situated 500 km (310 miles) north-west of Mada'in Salih.

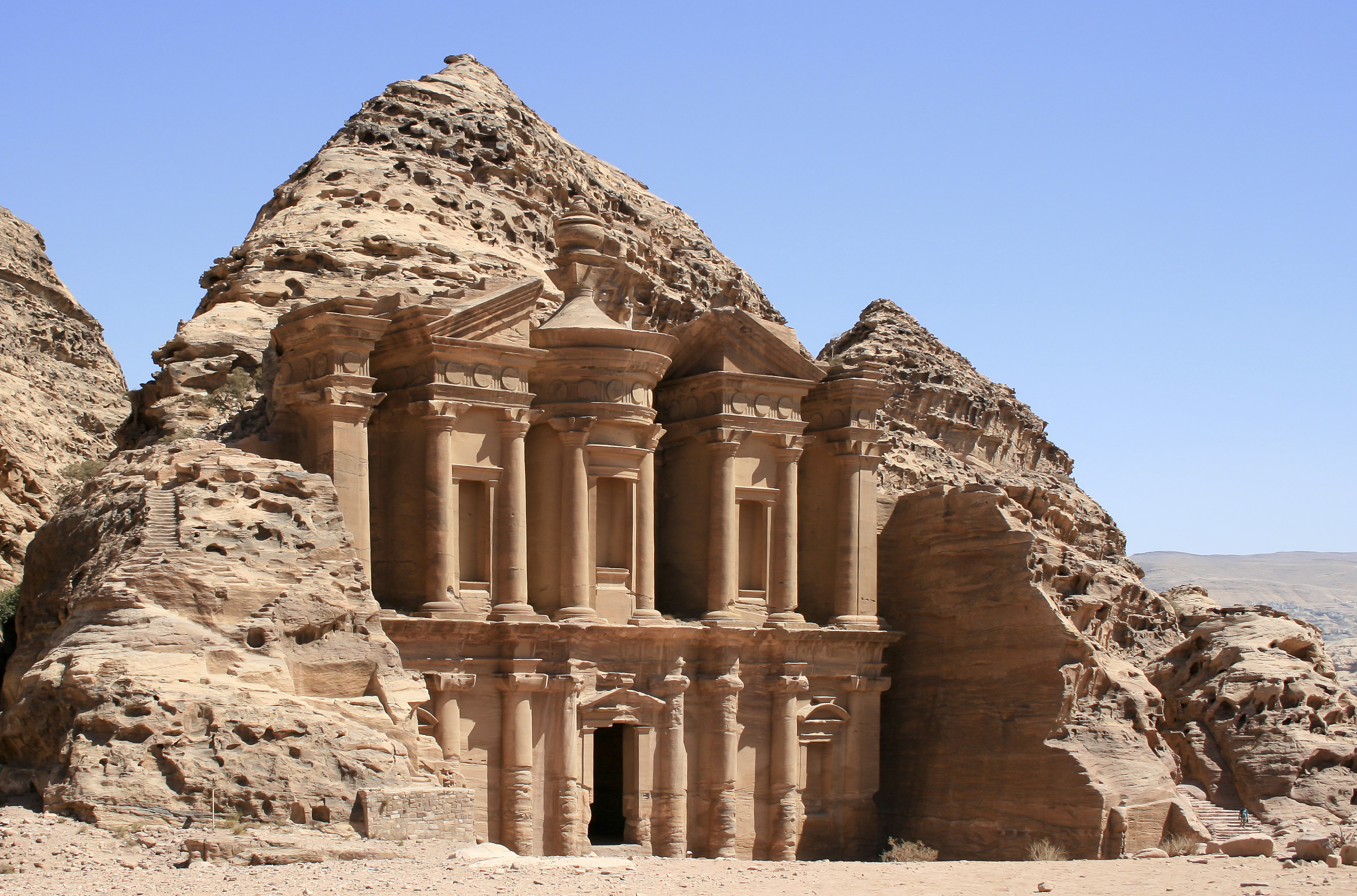
Ed-Deir (Arabic: الدير, lit. 'the Monastery') in Petra, Jordan

The Nabataean site of Hegra was built around a residential zone and its oasis during the 1st century CE. The sandstone outcroppings were carved to build the necropolis. A total of four necropolis sites have survived, which featured 131 monumental rock-cut tombs spread out over 13.4 km (8.3 miles), many with inscribed Nabataean epigraphs on their façades:

Necropolis	Location	Period of construction	Notable features
Jabal al-Mahjar	North	no information	Tombs were cut on the eastern and western sides of four parallel rock outcrops. Façade decorations are small in size.
Qasr al walad	no information	0–58 AD	Includes 31 tombs decorated with fine inscriptions and artistic elements like birds, human faces and imaginary beings. Contains the most monumental of rock-cut tombs, including the largest façade measuring 16 m (52 ft) high.
Area C	South-east	16–61 AD	Consists of a single isolated outcrop containing 19 cut tombs. No ornamentations were carved on the façades.
Jabal al-Khuraymat	South-west	7–73 AD	The largest of the four, consisting of numerous outcrops separated by sandy zones, although only eight of the outcrops have cut tombs, totaling 48 in quantity. The poor quality of sandstone and exposure to prevailing winds resulted to the poor state of conservation of most façades.

Non-monumental burial sites, totaling 2,000, are also part of the place. A closer observation of the façades indicates the social status of the buried person—the size and ornamentation of the structure reflect the wealth of the person. Some façades had plates on top of the entrances providing information about the grave owners, the religious system, and the masons who carved them. Many graves indicate military ranks, leading archaeologists to speculate that the site might once have been a Nabataean military base, meant to protect the settlement's trading activities.

The Nabataean kingdom was not just situated at the crossroad of trade but also of culture. This is reflected in the varying motifs of the façade decorations, borrowing stylistic elements from Assyria, Phoenicia, Egypt and Hellenistic Alexandria, combined with the native artistic style. Roman decorations and Latin scripts also figured on the rock-cut tombs when the territory was annexed by the Roman Empire. In contrast to the elaborate exteriors, the interiors of the rock-cut structures are severe and plain.

A religious area, known as "Jabal Ithlib," is located to the north-east of the site. It is believed to have been originally dedicated to the Nabataean deity Dushara. A narrow corridor, 40 metres (131 ft) long between the high rocks and reminiscent of the Siq in Petra, leads to the hall of the Diwan, a Muslim's council-chamber or law-court. Small religious sanctuaries bearing inscriptions were also cut into the rock in the vicinity.

The residential area is located in the middle of the plain, far from the outcrops. The primary material of construction for the houses and the enclosing wall was sun-dried mudbrick. Few vestiges of the residential area remain.

Water is supplied by 130 wells, situated in the western and north-western part of the site, where the water table was at a depth of only 20 m (66 ft). The wells, with diameters ranging 4–7 m (13–23 ft), were cut into the rock, although some, dug in loose ground, had to be reinforced with sandstone.

== In the Qur'an ==
According to the Quran, the site of al-Hijr was settled by the tribe of Thamud, who "(took) for (themselves) palaces from its plains and (carved) from the mountains, homes".^{[Quran 7:73–79]}^{[Quran 11:61–69]}^{[Quran 15:80–84]} The tribe fell to idol worship and oppression became prevalent. The prophet Salih, to whom the site's name of Mada'in Salih is often attributed, called on the Thamudis to repent. The Thamudis disregarded the warning and instead commanded Salih to summon a pregnant she-camel of God from the back of a mountain, and a pregnant she-camel was sent to the people from the back of the mountain as proof of Salih's divine mission.

However, only a minority heeded his words. The non-believers killed the sacred camel instead of caring for it, and its calf ran back to the mountain from whence it came. The Thamudis were given three days before their punishment was to take place, since they disbelieved and did not heed the warning. Salih and his monotheistic followers left the city, but the others were punished by God—their souls leaving their lifeless bodies in the midst of an earthquake and lightning blasts.

Robert G. Hoyland suggested that their name was subsequently adopted by other new groups that inhabited the region of Mada'in Salih after the disappearance of the original people of Thamud. This suggestion is also supported by the narration of Abd Allah ibn Umar ibn al-Khattab and the analysis of ibn Kathir, which report that people called the region of Thamud al-Hijr, while they called the province of Mada'in Salih as Arḍ Thamūd 'Land of Thamud' and Bayt Thamud 'House of Thamud'. The term "Thamud" was thus not applied to the groups that lived in Mada'in Salih, such as Lihyanites and Nabataeans, but rather to the region itself, and according to classical sources, it was agreed upon that the only remaining Thamudites were the Banu Thaqif, who inhabited the city of Taif south of Mecca.

== Tombs ==
Funerary monuments are the most prominent and best-preserved remains at Hegra. As at Petra, rock-cut tombs dominate the archaeological landscape, but at Hegra they are often preserved in better condition. The funerary record includes three main types: monumental rock-cut tombs, simple trench graves, and tumuli, reflecting social hierarchy and long-term use of the site.

The monumental tombs are carved into the sandstone outcrops surrounding the urban centre and were deliberately oriented toward the city to maximize visibility and commemorate elite families. These tombs form several necropolises encircling the settlement. In contrast, trench graves, cut directly into the bedrock, are found on the summits of the crags and were intended for non-elite individuals; thousands have been documented. Tumuli, consisting of stone mounds, are mainly located on plateaus west of the city. Excavation of one tumulus revealed a tower-tomb structure that may predate the Nabataean period but was reused between the first century BC and early third century AD.

Eighty-six monumental tombs display carved facades belonging to a distinct Nabataean architectural tradition. Several stylistic groups have been identified, including early "proto-Hegra" types and a later "Hegra type," distinguished by the presence of an attic. Tomb size varies greatly, from modest façades to monumental examples over twenty metres high, the largest of which is called al-Farid.

Unlike most tombs at Petra, many Hegra tombs bear Nabataean inscriptions carved above the entrance. These functioned as legal documents recording ownership, burial rights, prohibitions, and dates based on the reigns of Nabataean kings. The tomb owners belonged to the urban elite and included both men and women, as well as officials and professionals. Internally, tombs were collective family burial chambers containing multiple graves cut into walls or floors and added over time, reflecting prolonged and repeated use across generations.

== Gallery ==
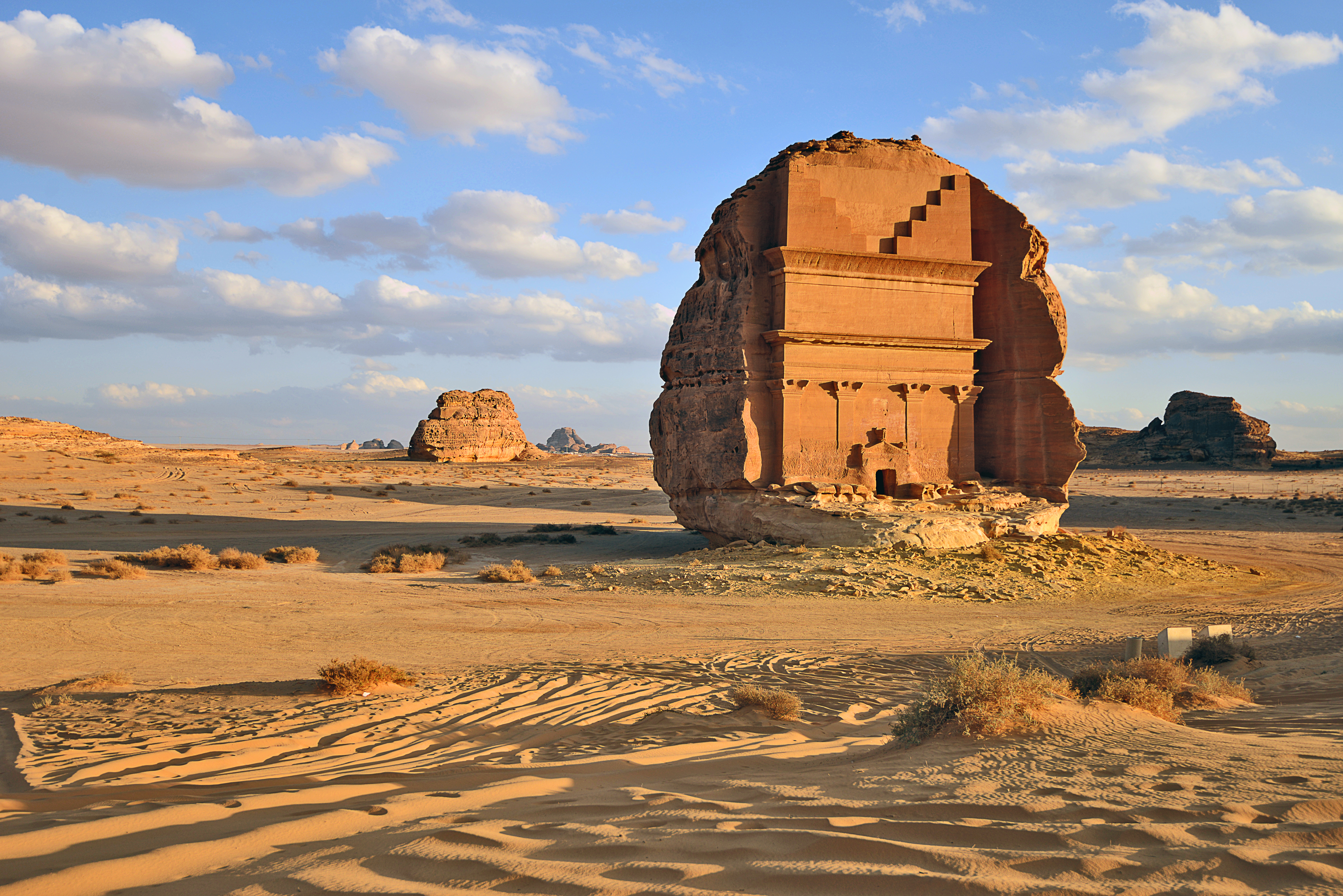
Qasr Al-Farid necropolis

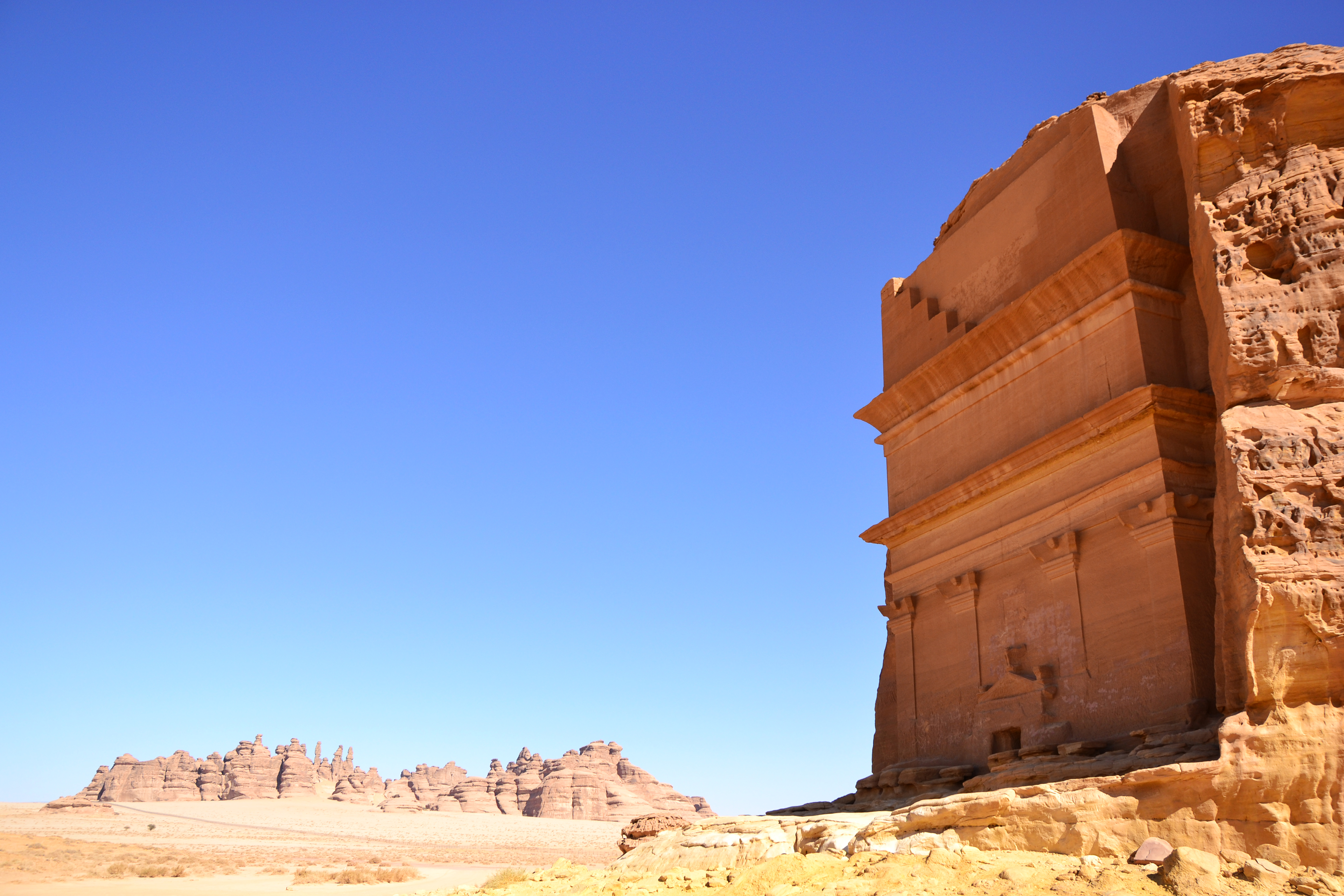
Qasr Al-Farid necropolis

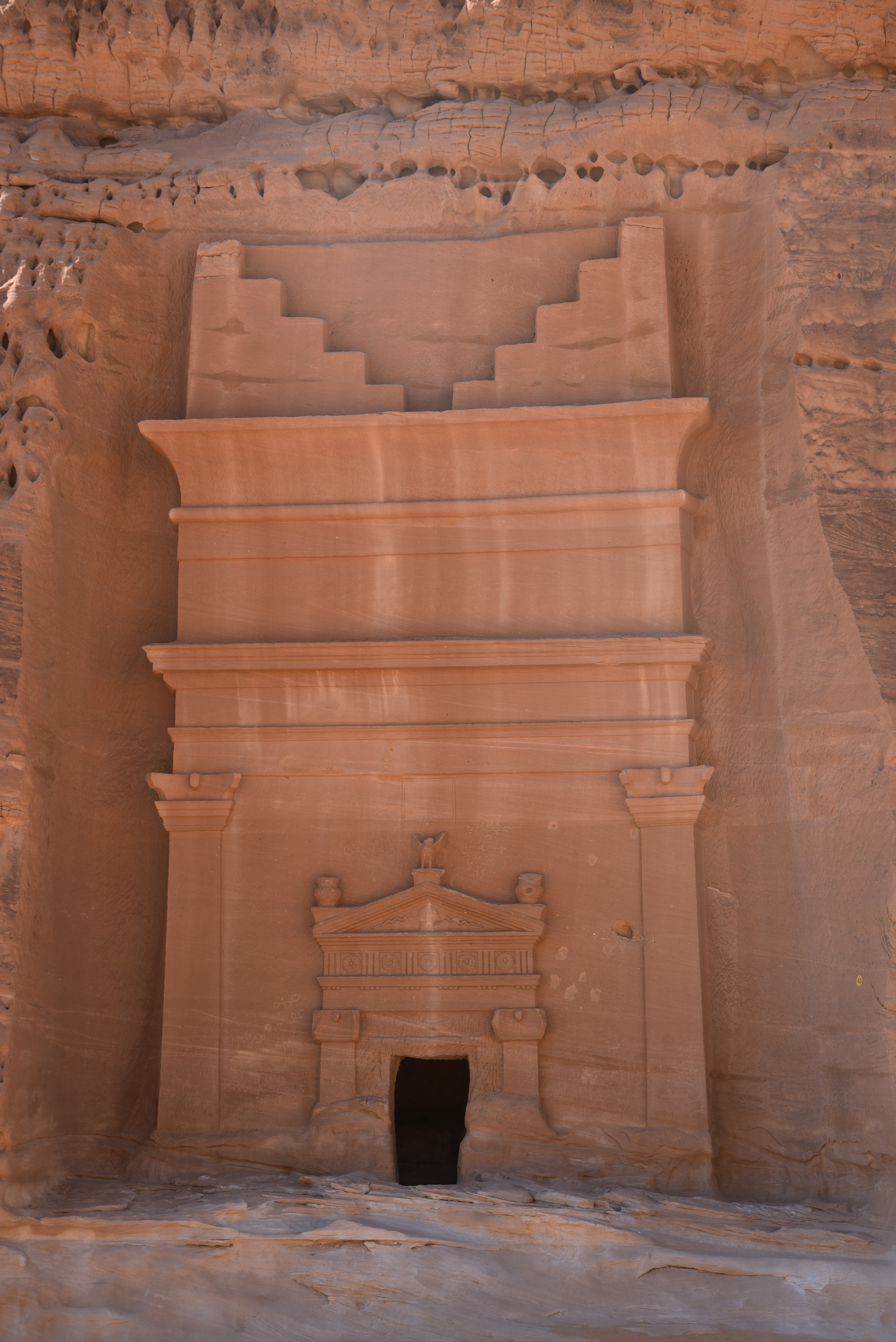
Qasr al-Bint necropolis

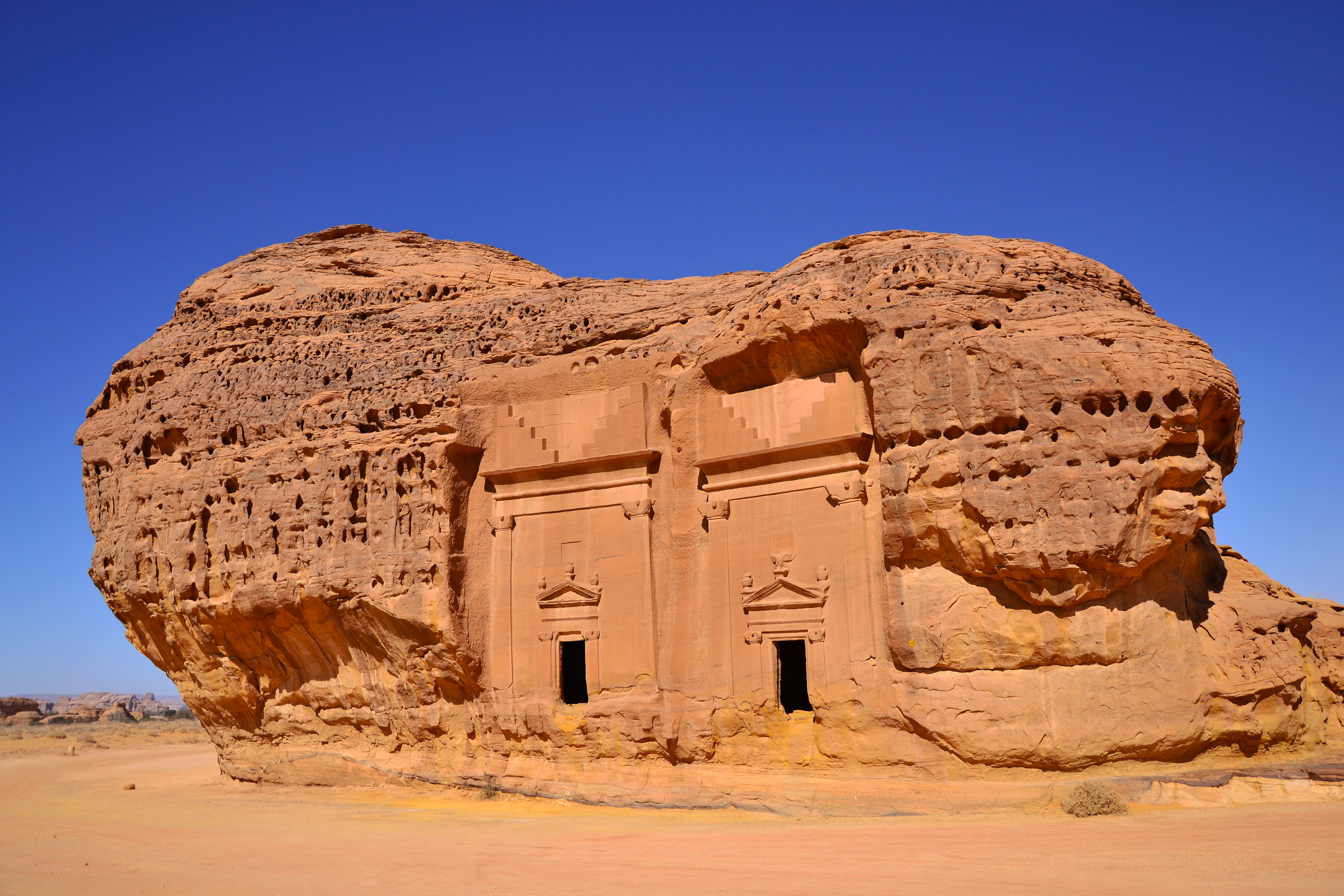
Tombs in "Area C”

multiple buildings

multiple buildings

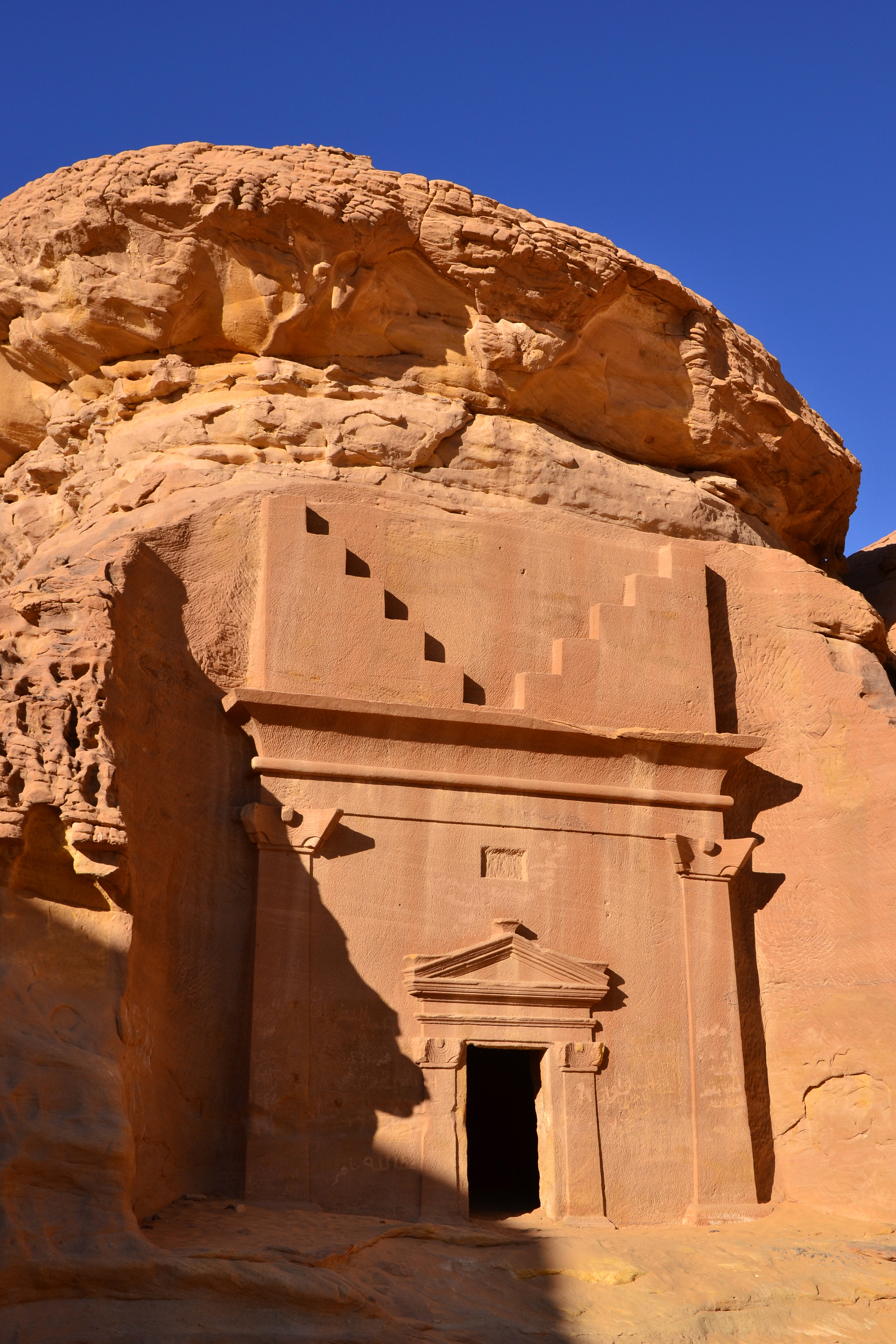
Facade of a tomb

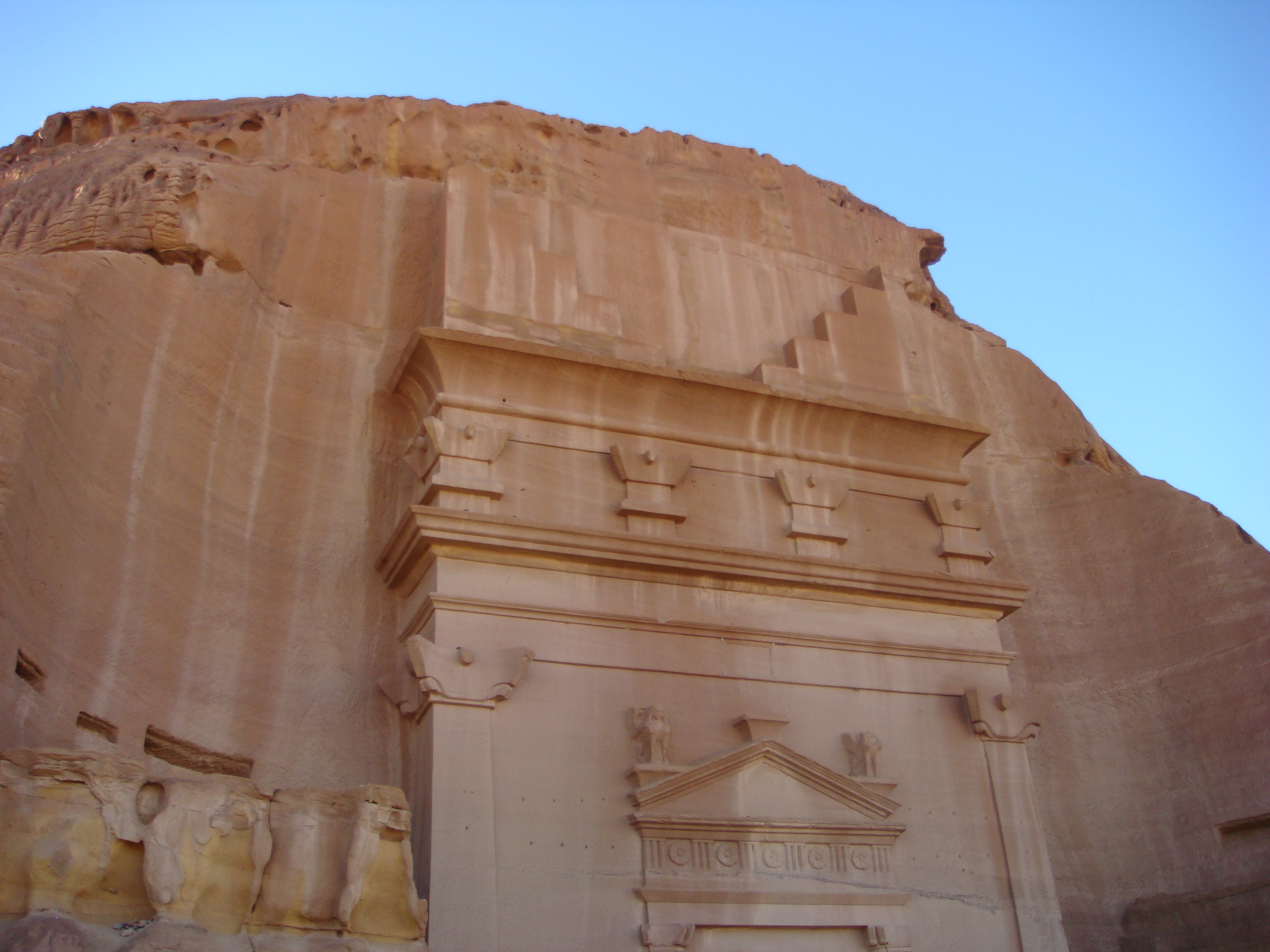
Facade of a tomb

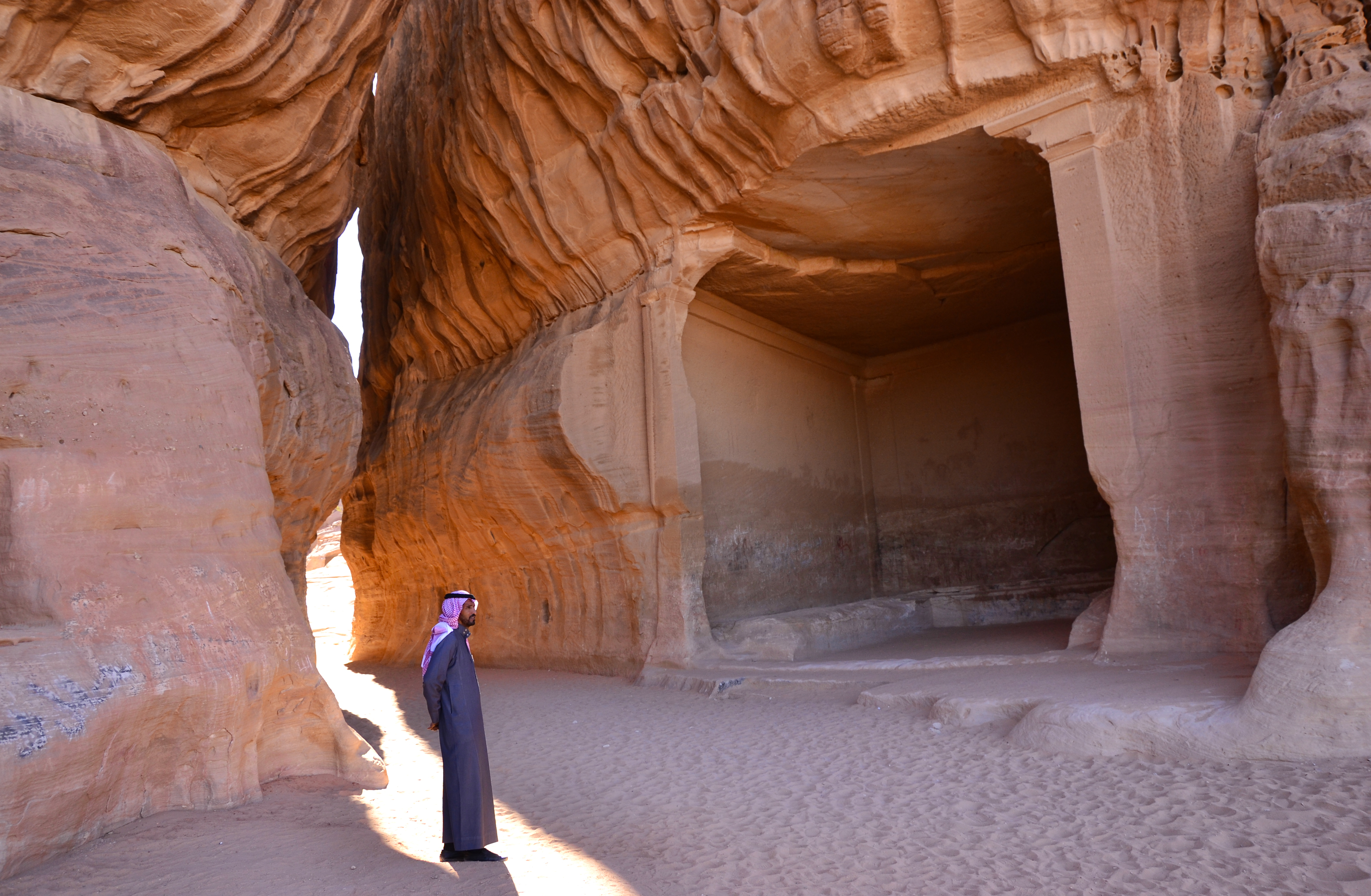
The diwan

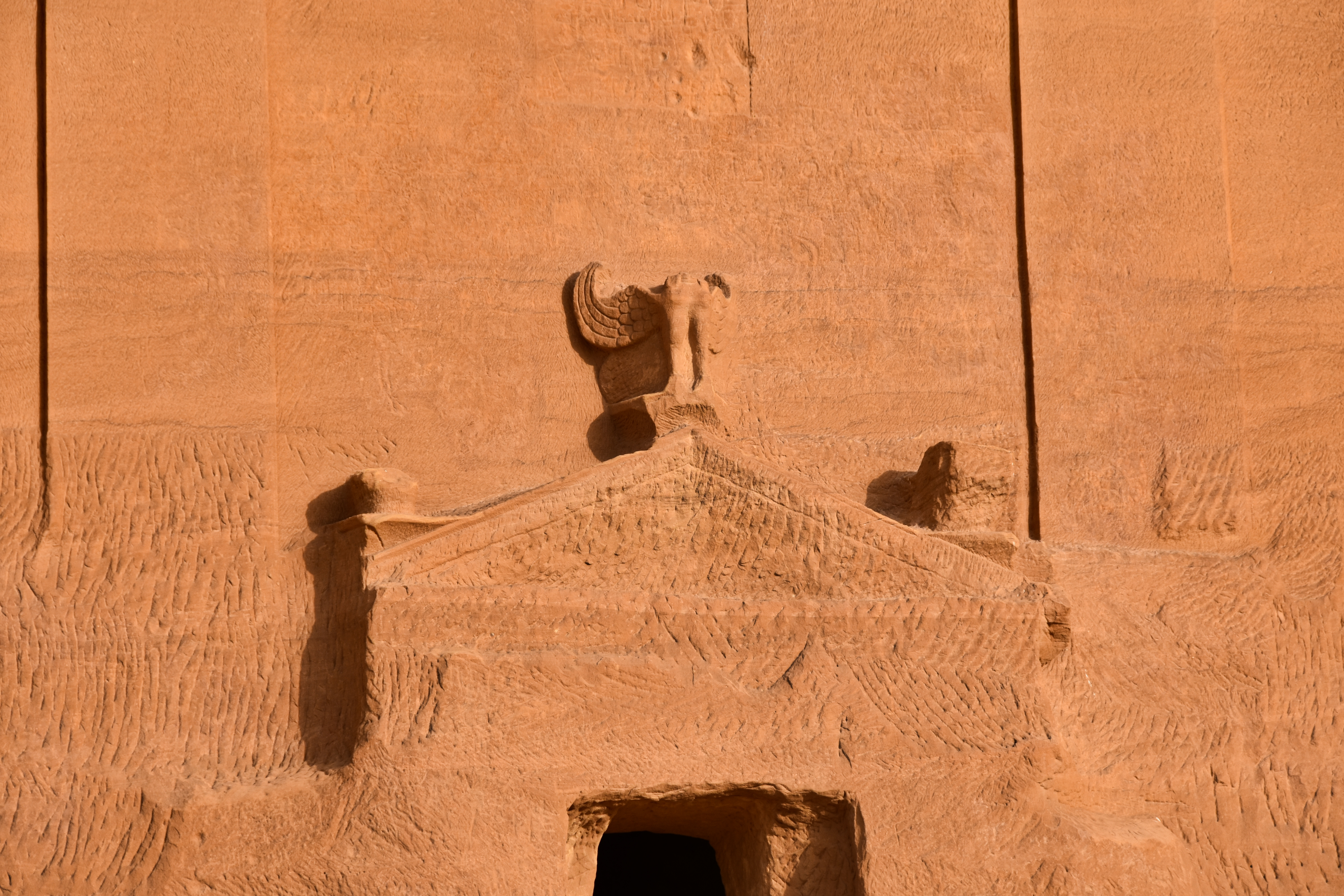
Facade of Qasr Al-Farid

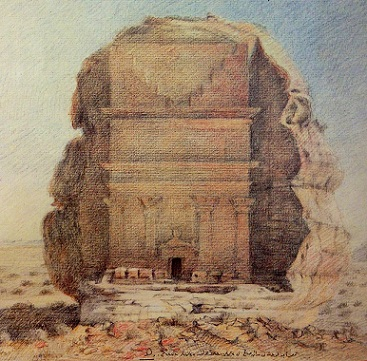
Drawing of Al-Farid Palace by Wahbi Al-Hariri in 1979

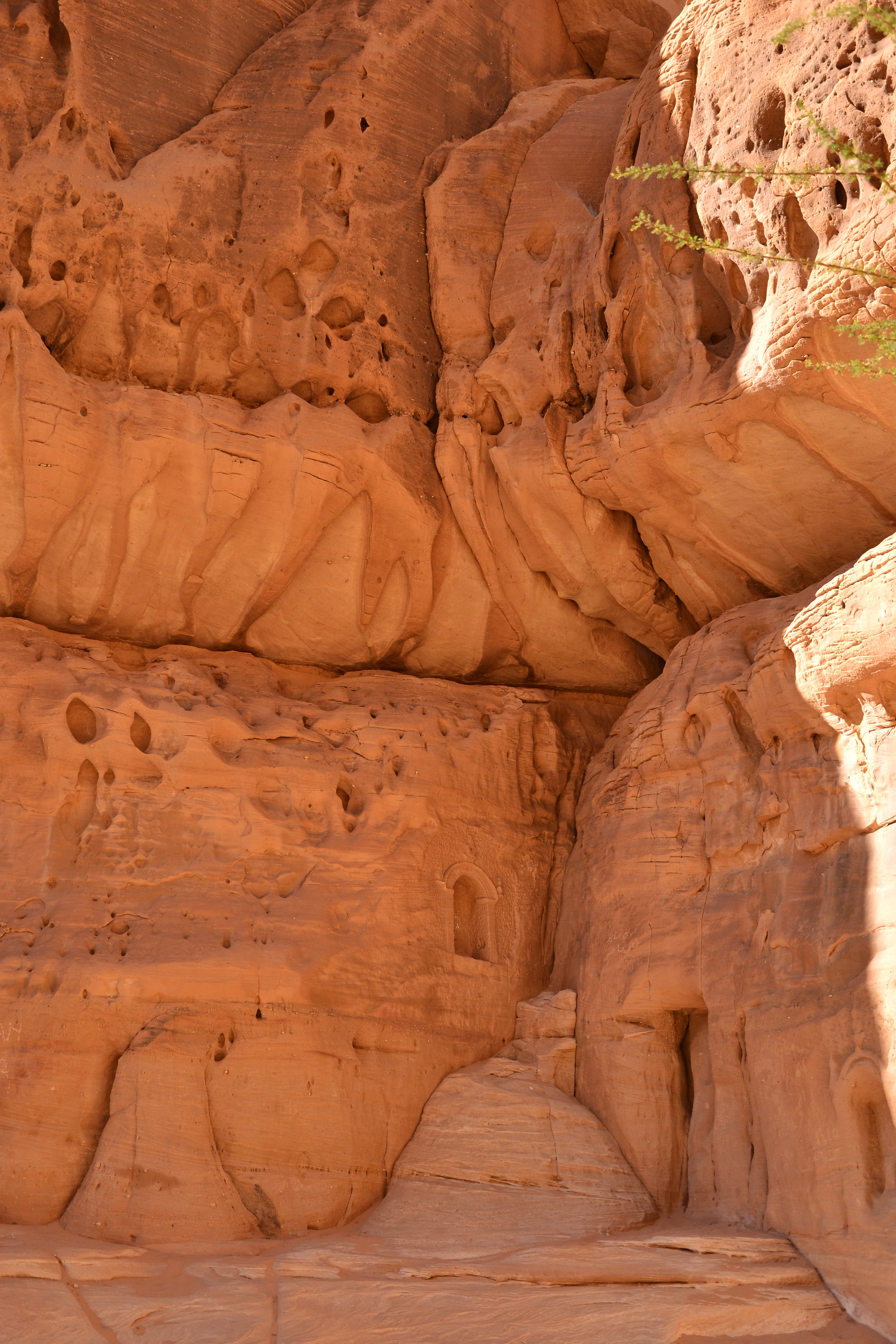
One of the regions of Jabal Athlab

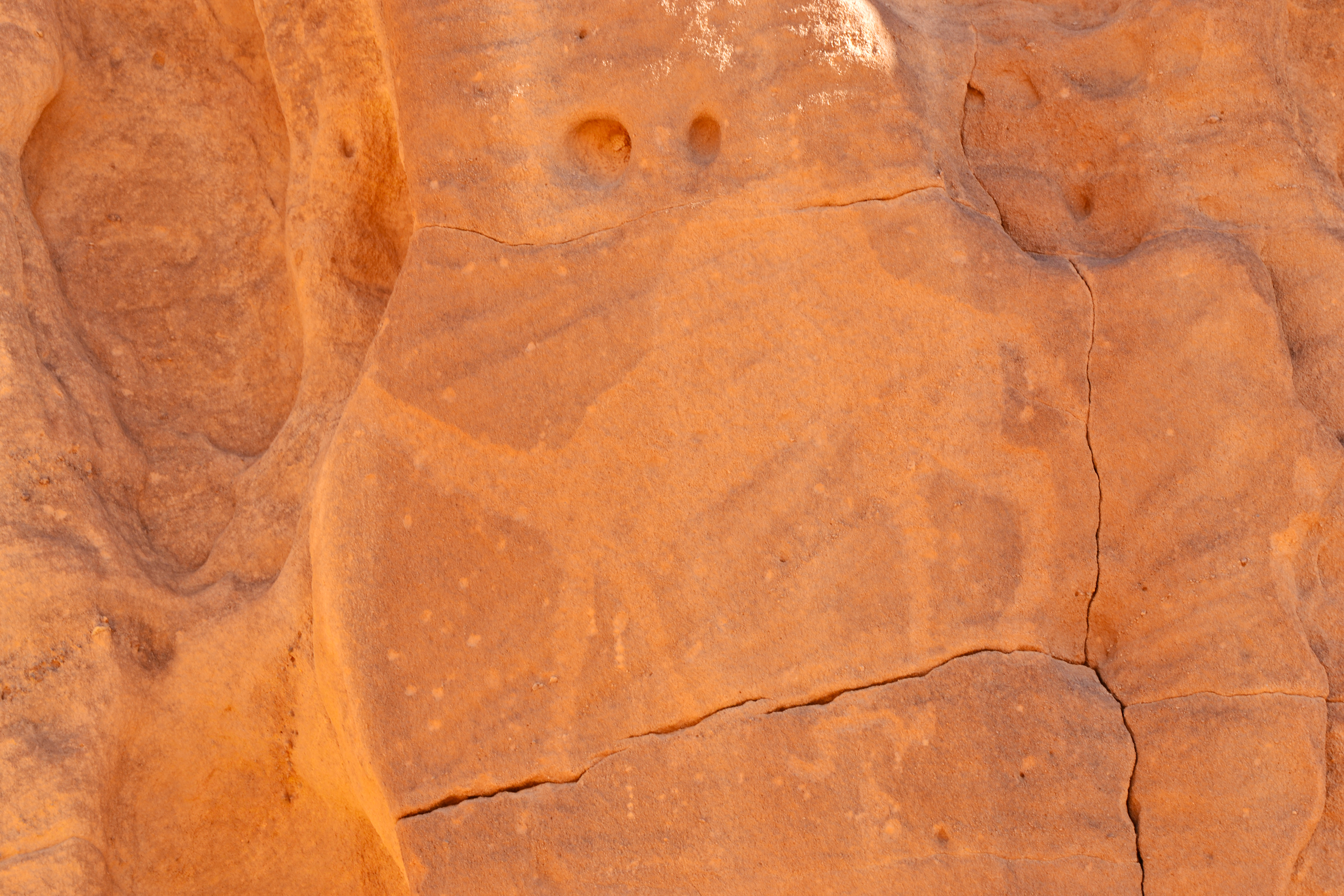
Inscriptions

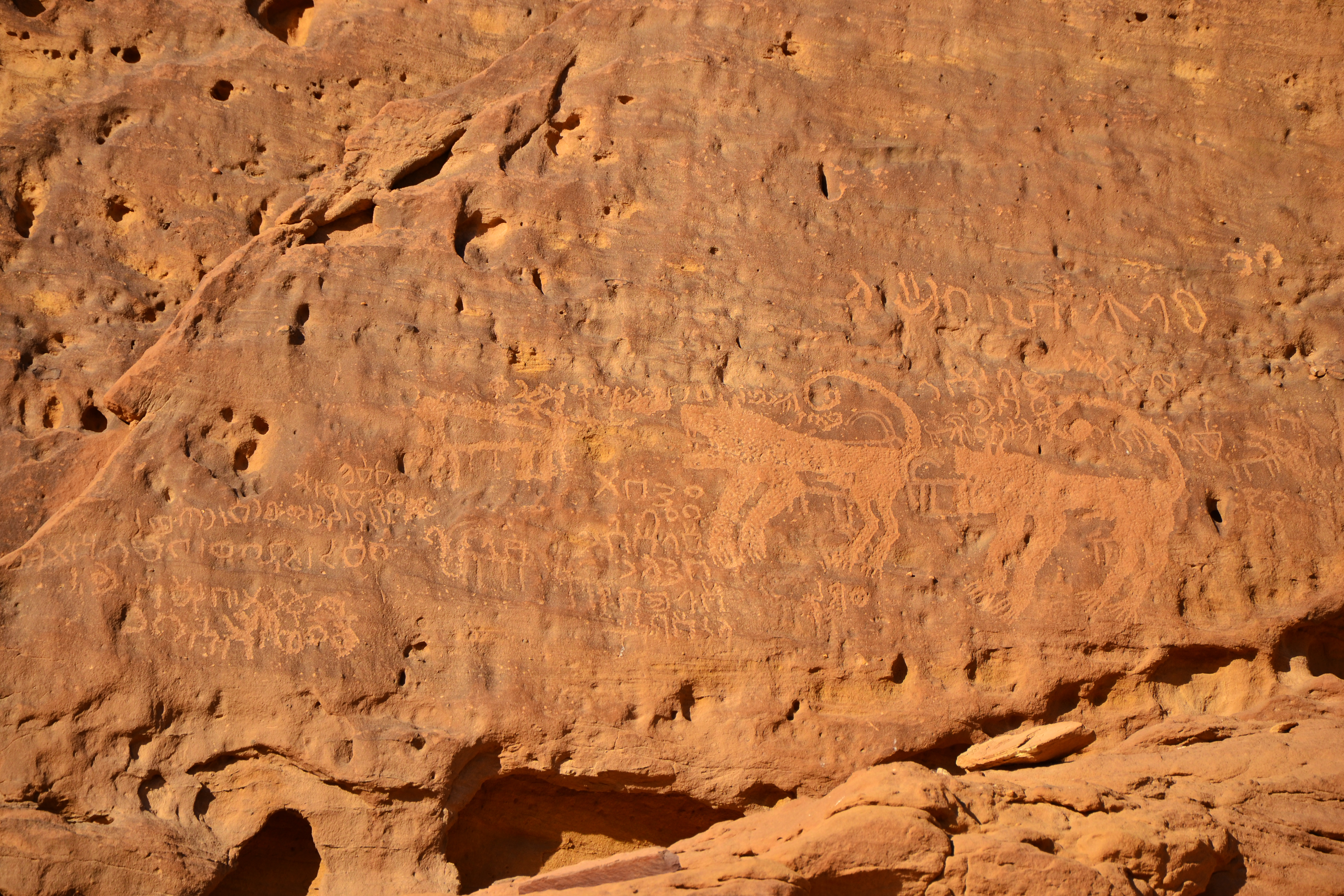
Inscriptions

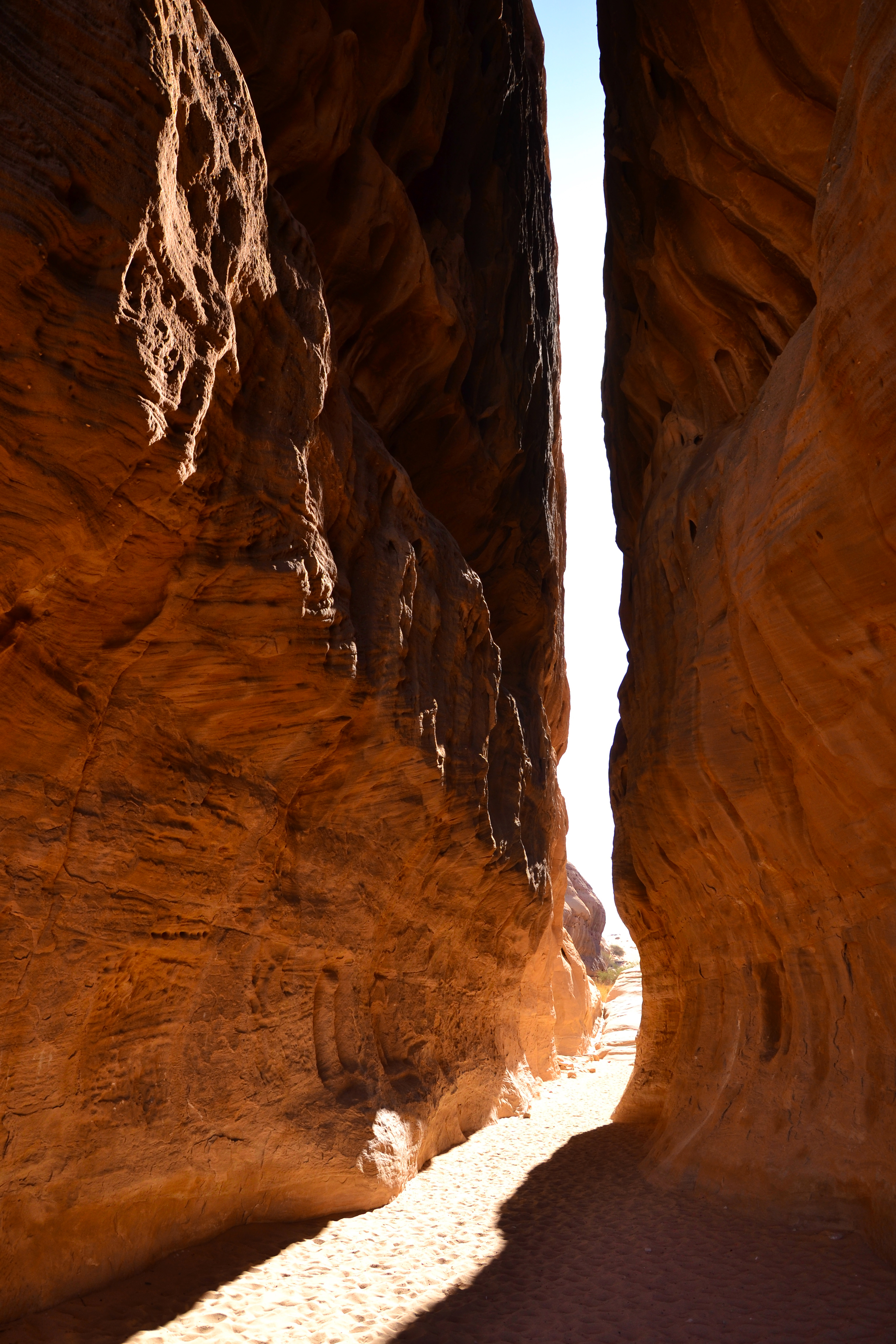

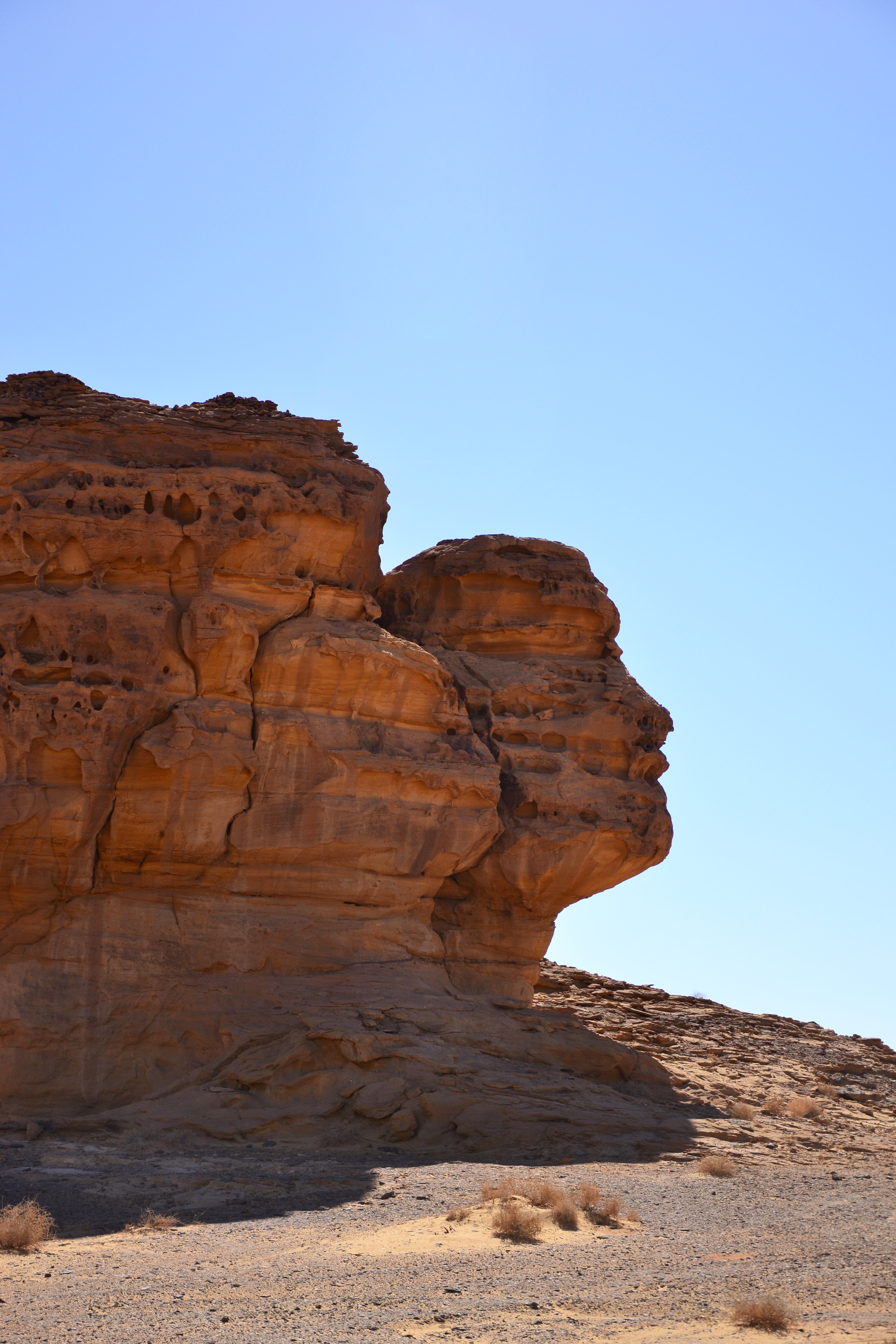

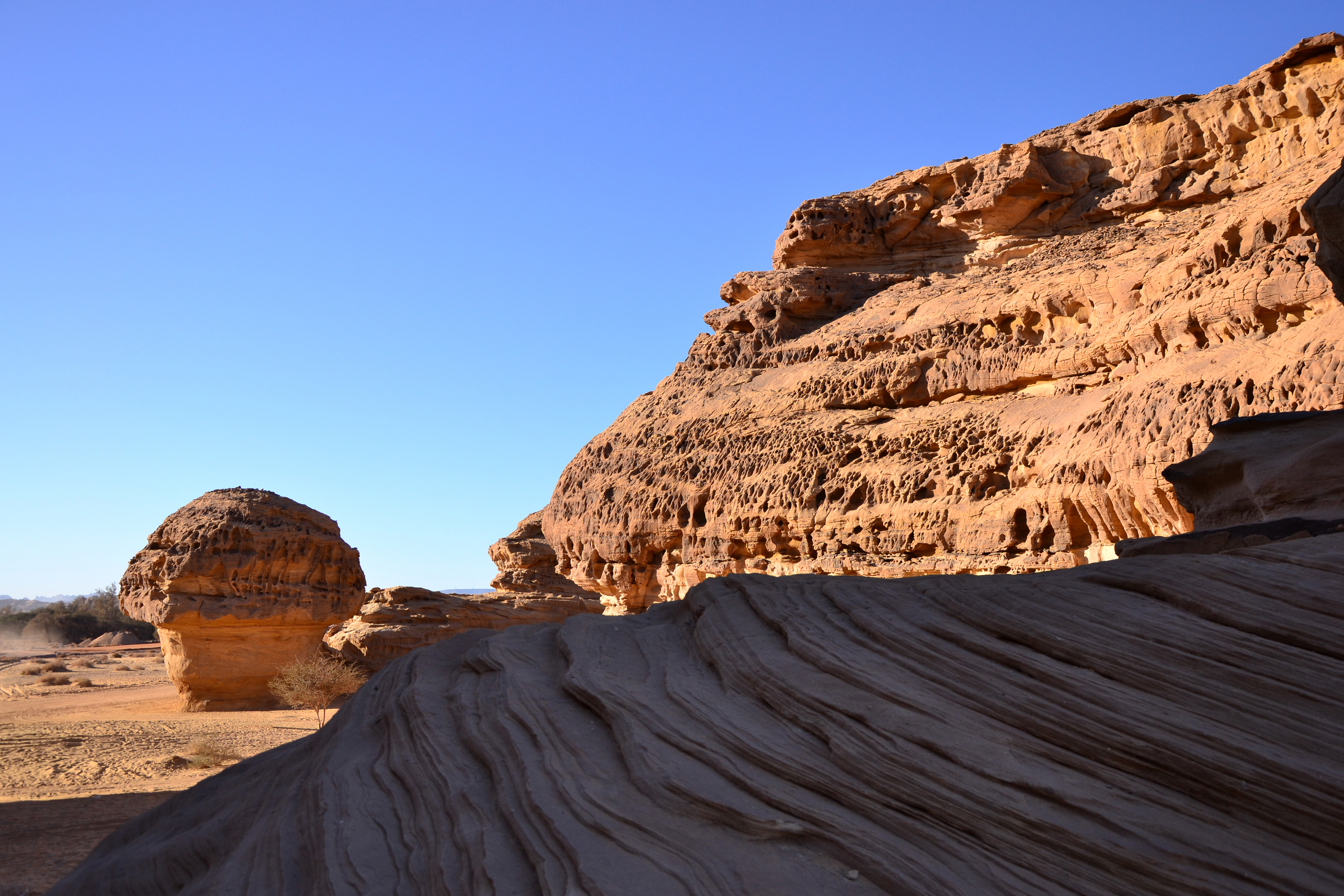
Sandstones at Madain Saleh

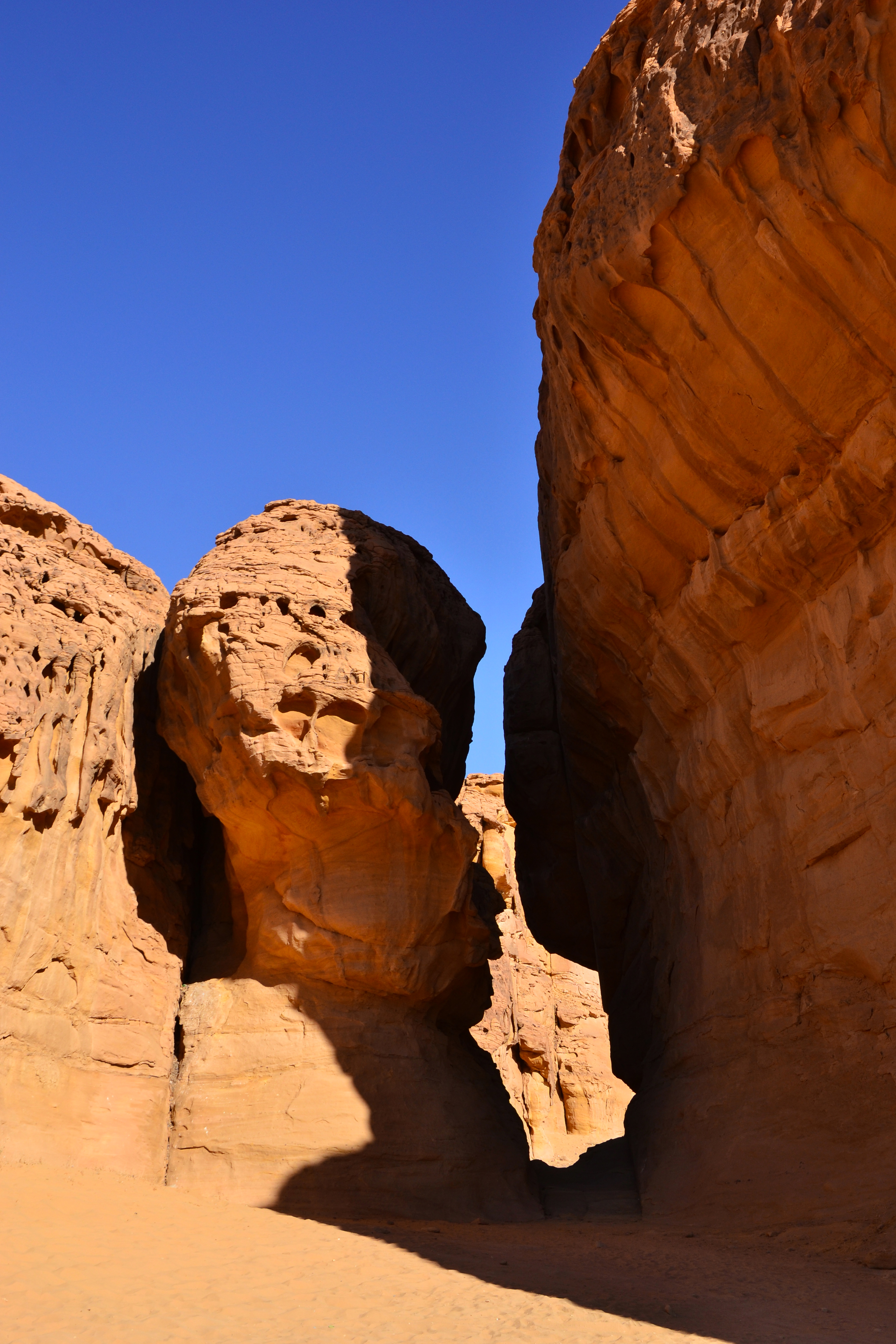
Natural Landscape

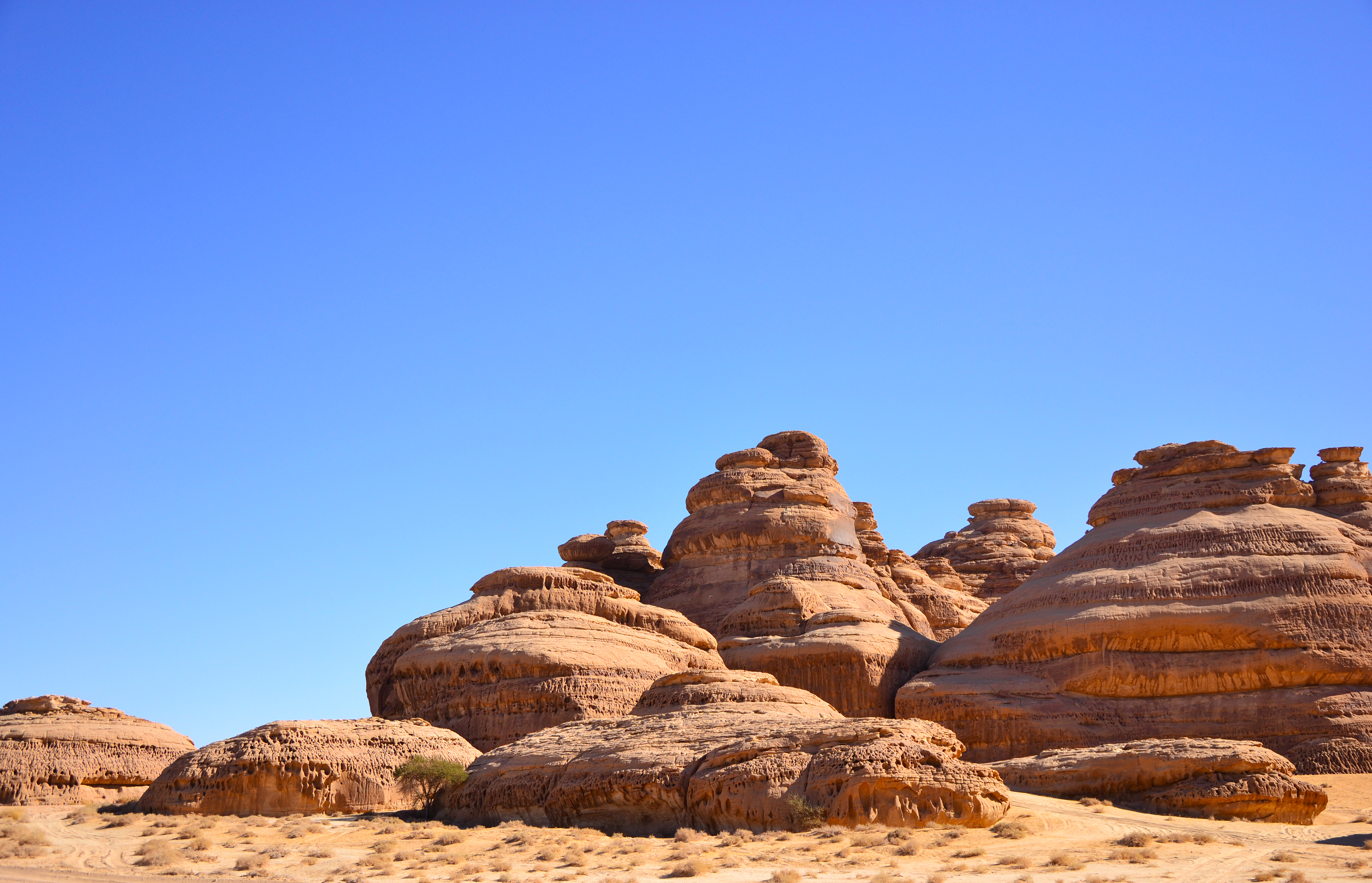
Natural landscape

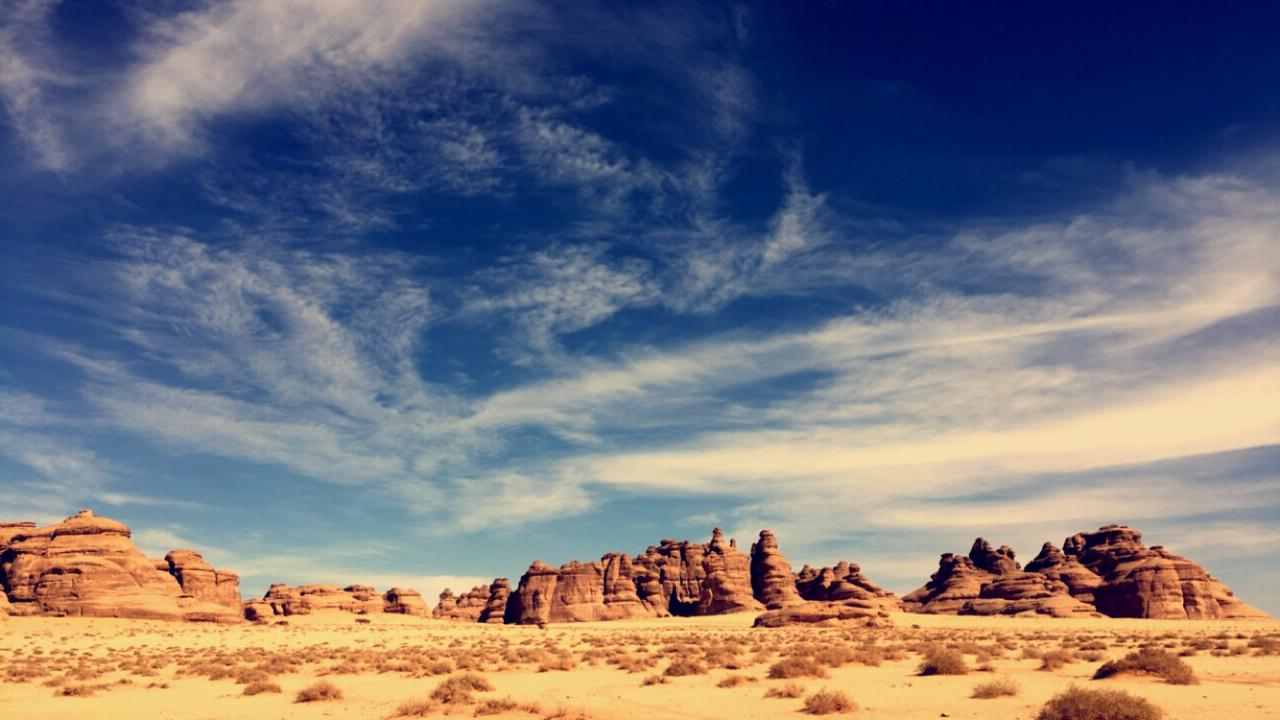
Natural Landscape

== See also ==
- List of World Heritage Sites in Saudi Arabia
- Iram of the Pillars
- Leuke Kome
- Lihyan
- Nabataeans
- List of colossal sculptures in situ
- Ancient towns in Saudi Arabia
- Jabal Ikmah

== Sources ==
- Fiema, Zbigniew (2025). "Freedmen in Roman Hegra". In Repper, Rebecca; Bewley, Robert; Bishop, Mike (eds.). Reframing the "Desert Frontier": Studies in the Ancient Near East and Northern Arabia in Honour of David Kennedy. Sydney University Press. pp. 27–62.
- Fisher, Greg (2021). The Roman World from Romulus to Muhammad: A New History. Routledge.
- Nehme, Laila; Al-Talhi, Daifallah; Villeneuve, Francois (2010). "Hegra of Arabia Felix". In Al-Ghabban, Ali Ibrahim; Andre-Salvini, Beatrice; Demange, Francoise; Juvin, Carine; Cotty, Marianne (eds.). Roads of Arabia: Archaeology and History of the Kingdom of Saudi Arabia. Somogy Art Publishing. pp. 287–307.
