= List of World Heritage Sites in Saudi Arabia =

Location of World Heritage Sites in Saudi Arabia. Red dots represent cultural sites, the green dot is a natural site.

The United Nations Educational, Scientific and Cultural Organization (UNESCO) World Heritage Sites are places of importance to cultural or natural heritage as described in the UNESCO World Heritage Convention, established in 1972. Cultural heritage consists of monuments (such as architectural works, monumental sculptures, or inscriptions), groups of buildings, and sites (including archaeological sites). Natural heritage consists of natural features (physical and biological formations), geological and physiographical formations (including habitats of threatened species of animals and plants), and natural sites which are important from the point of view of science, conservation, or natural beauty.

The Kingdom of Saudi Arabia accepted the convention on 7 August 1978, making its historical sites eligible for inclusion on the list. Saudi Arabia has eight sites on the list and a further fourteen on the tentative list. It has served on the World Heritage Committee once, from 2019 to 2023.

== World Heritage Sites ==
UNESCO lists sites under ten criteria; each entry must meet at least one of the criteria. Criteria i through vi are cultural, and vii through x are natural.

World Heritage Sites
Site	Image	Location (province)	Year listed	UNESCO data	Description
Al-Hijr Archaeological Site (Madâin Sâlih)		al-'Ula	2008	1293; ii, iii (cultural)	The majority of the archaeological remains date back to the time of the Nabataean Kingdom, featuring well-preserved monumental tombs with decorated facades dating from the 1st century BC to the 1st century AD. The site also features some 50 inscriptions of the pre-Nabataean period and some cave drawings.
At-Turaif District in Diriyah		Diriyah	2010	1329; iv, v, vi (cultural)	Al-Turaif District is a ca. 29 ha historical urban area. Founded in the 15th century, the town flourished in the 18th-19th centuries. Its Najdi-style desert architecture is specific to the central Arabian Peninsula and includes the remains of many palaces and an urban ensemble built on the edge of the ad-Dir’iyah oasis.
Historic Jeddah, the Gate to Makkah		Jeddah	2014	1361; ii, iv, vi (cultural)	Historic Jeddah was as a major port for Indian Ocean trade routes, channelling goods to Mecca. It was also the gateway for Muslim pilgrims to Mecca who arrived by sea.
Rock Art in the Hail Region		Hail Province	2015	1472; i, iii (cultural)	This property shows numerous representations of human and animal figures covering 10,000 years of history.
Al-Ahsa Oasis		Al-Ahsa Oasis	2018	1563; iii, iv, v (cultural)	The Al-Ahsa Oasis is the largest oasis in the world, with 2.5 million date palms and evidence of historic settlement from the Neolithic to the present day.
Ḥimā Cultural Area		Najran Province	2021	1619; iii (Cultural)	Ḥimā Cultural Area contains a collection of rock art images illustrating hunting, fauna, flora and lifestyles of 7,000 years.
‘Uruq Bani Mu’arid Protected Area		Najran, Riyadh	2023	1472; vii, ix (natural)	The property encompasses the western part of the greatest expanse of windblown sand on Earth, known as Ar Rub' al-KhaIi, and conserves one of the Earth’s most spectacular desert landscapes.
The Cultural Landscape of Al-Faw Archaeological Area		Riyadh Province	2024	1712; ii, v (cultural)	Lying at a strategic point of the ancient trade routes of the Arabian Peninsula, the property was abruptly abandoned around the 5th century CE.

== Tentative List ==
In addition to sites inscribed on the World Heritage List, member states can maintain a list of tentative sites that they may consider for nomination. Nominations for the World Heritage List are only accepted if the site was previously listed on the tentative list. Saudi Arabia has fourteen properties on its tentative list.

Tentative sites
Site	Image	Location (province)	Year listed	UNESCO criteria	Description
Zee Ain Heritage Village in Al-Baha Region		Al Bahah	2015	iv, v (cultural)	Characterized by traditional stone architecture and features stone-built houses and a historic mosque, illustrating the adaptation of its inhabitants to the mountainous environment and their emphasis on community and defense. The surrounding agricultural terraces showcase early farming techniques and water management.
Rijal Almaa Heritage Village in Assir Region		Asir	2015	iv, v (cultural)	A historical village renowned for its distinctive clay and stone tower houses. This village, which consists of about 60 multi-story buildings, showcases the unique architectural style of the Assir region, featuring brightly colored facades and intricate wooden window frames.
Egyptian Hajj Road		Madinah, Makkah, Tabuk	2015	ii, iv, v (cultural)	The road served as a pilgrimage route for Hajj travelers from Egypt to Mecca. This ancient path was part of a network of routes facilitating the annual Islamic pilgrimage, accommodating the logistical needs of travelers with rest stations, wells, and forts for protection against the harsh desert conditions and potential threats. Over centuries, it played a crucial role in the religious, cultural, and economic exchanges between regions.
Syrian Hajj Road		Madinah, Makkah, Tabuk	2015	ii, iv, v (cultural)	A route for Hajj pilgrims traveling from Syria to Mecca. It featured a network of roads with facilities like caravanserais and water sources, ensuring the safety and well-being of travelers. This route facilitated not only religious journeys but also cultural and economic exchanges between regions.
Hejaz railway		Madinah, Tabuk	2015	ii, iv, vi (cultural)	A historic rail line originally built to facilitate the pilgrimage to Mecca, connecting Damascus in Syria to Medina in Saudi Arabia. Beyond its religious significance, the railway also served strategic and economic purposes, enhancing the Ottoman Empire's control over its distant provinces and fostering trade.
Farasan Islands Protected Area		Jazan	2019	x (natural)	A conservation site in Saudi Arabia, located in the Red Sea. It encompasses a group of islands known for their rich biodiversity, including coral reefs, mangroves, and a variety of marine and bird life. The area is particularly known for its nesting populations of birds and its significance as a habitat for endangered species. The islands also hold archaeological sites and cultural heritage, reflecting a long history of human habitation.
The Hajj Pilgrimage Routes: The Darb Zubaydah		Ḥa'il, Madinah, Makkah, Northern Borders, Qassim	2022	ii, iv, vi (cultural)	From Kufa in Iraq to Mecca in Saudi Arabia. This ancient pathway was named after Zubaydah bint Ja`far, the wife of the Abbasid Caliph Harun al-Rashid, who significantly contributed to its development by constructing wells, reservoirs, and rest stations to support the pilgrims. The route facilitated safer and more manageable journeys for thousands of Hajj pilgrims through the harsh desert landscape.
The Ancient Walled Oases of Northern Arabia		Al Jawf, Ḥa'il, Tabuk	2022	ii, v (cultural)	A series of fortified settlements that flourished in the harsh desert environment of the Arabian Peninsula. They served as hubs for trade, agriculture, and settlement, thanks to their strategic locations along ancient caravan routes and their ability to sustain life through sophisticated water management systems. The walls that surrounded them provided protection against raiders and helped control the microclimate for agriculture, making them vital centers for the development of early Arabian societies.
The Rural Cultural Landscapes of Sarawat Mountains		Al-Bahah, Asir, Makkah	2023	ii, iii, v (cultural)	Traditional villages and agricultural terraces. These landscapes highlight sustainable living through stone and mud-brick houses and terraced farming, which utilizes scarce water efficiently. This region embodies the cultural heritage and agricultural traditions of its inhabitants, reflecting centuries of sustainable practices and community resilience in challenging environments.
The Oil Industrial Heritage in Saudi Arabia		Eastern Province, Makkah	2023	ii, iv, v (cultural)	Historic oil fields, refineries, and industrial sites that mark the beginning of oil exploration and production in the early 20th century. These sites not only represent technological advancements but also the socio-economic changes that oil discovery brought to Saudi Arabia, turning it into a key player in the global energy market.
Coral Reefs of the Gulf of Aqaba and the Red Sea in the Kingdom of Saudi Arabia		Tabuk	2024	viii, ix, x (natural)	Home to a wide variety of coral species, fish, and other marine organisms. They play a crucial role in marine life support, local fishing industries, and the tourism sector.

== See also ==
- List of Intangible Cultural Heritage elements in Saudi Arabia
