= Majlis =

Arabic term used in the Muslim world

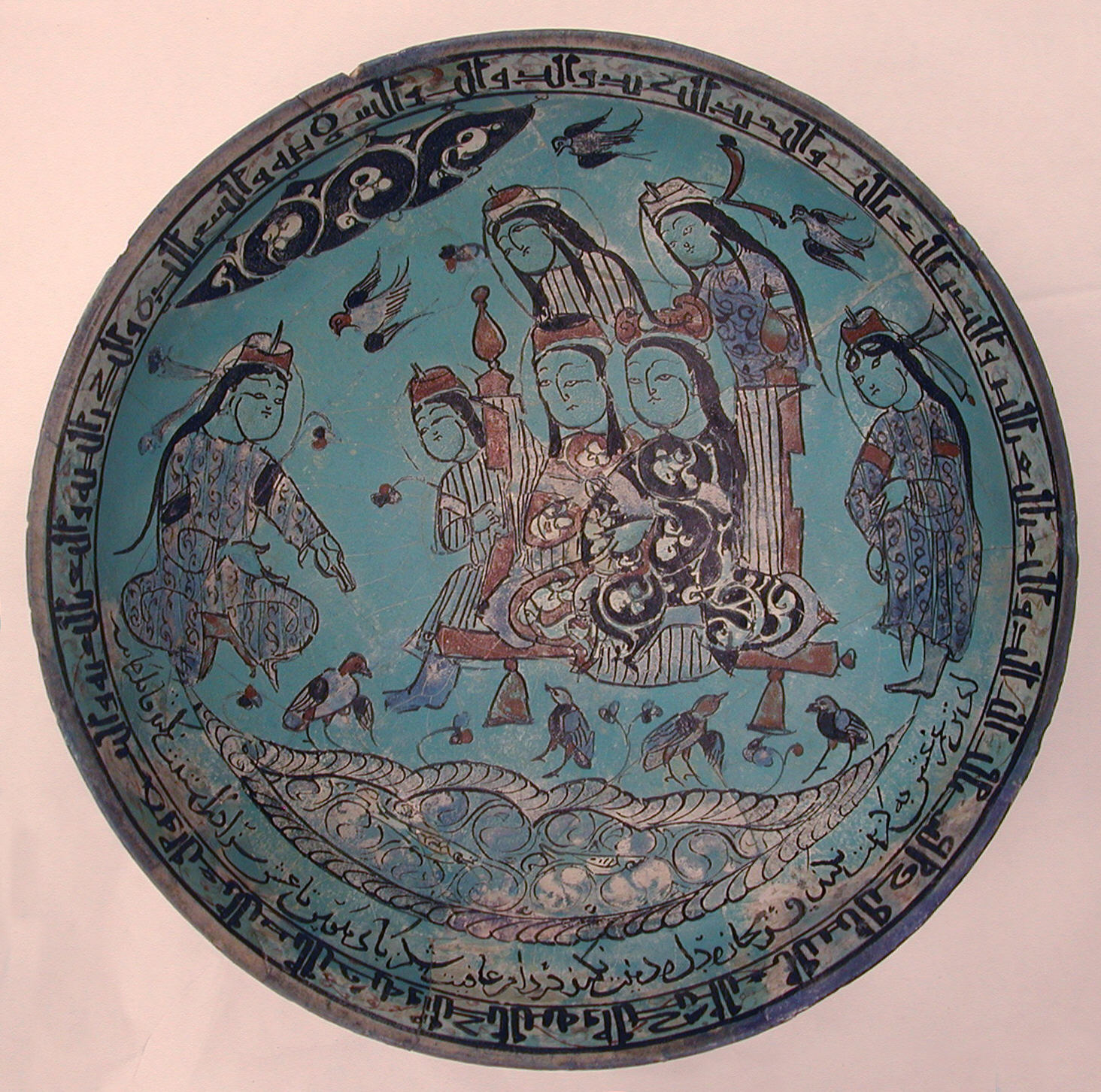
Bowl with a majlis scene by a pond, signed by Abu Zayd al-Kashani in 1187, Seljuk Empire, Iran.

Majlis (Note: Arabic: مجلس [ˈmadʒlɪs]; pl. مجالس Majālis [maˈdʒaːlɪs]; English: /ˈmædʒlɪs/ MAJ-lis) is an Arabic term meaning 'sitting room'. It is used to describe various types of special gatherings among common interest groups of administrative, social or religious nature in countries with linguistic or cultural connections to the Muslim world. Majlis can refer to a legislature as well and is used in the name of legislative councils or assemblies in some states.

== Etymology ==
Majlis is the Arabic word for a "sitting room." Its Semitic root is the verb جَلَس jalas meaning 'to sit', (cf. British English 'sitting room' and 'seat of government').

It is also romanized as Mejlis or Majles.

== History ==
In pre-Islamic Arabia, a majlis was a tribal council in which the male members participated in making decisions of common interest. The council was presided over by the chief (Sheikh). During the period of the Rashidun Caliphate, the Majlis al-Shura was formed to elect a new caliph. Al-Mawardi has written that members of the majlis should satisfy three conditions: they must be just, they must have enough knowledge to distinguish a good caliph from a bad one, and must have sufficient wisdom and judgement to select the best caliph.

== Residential ==
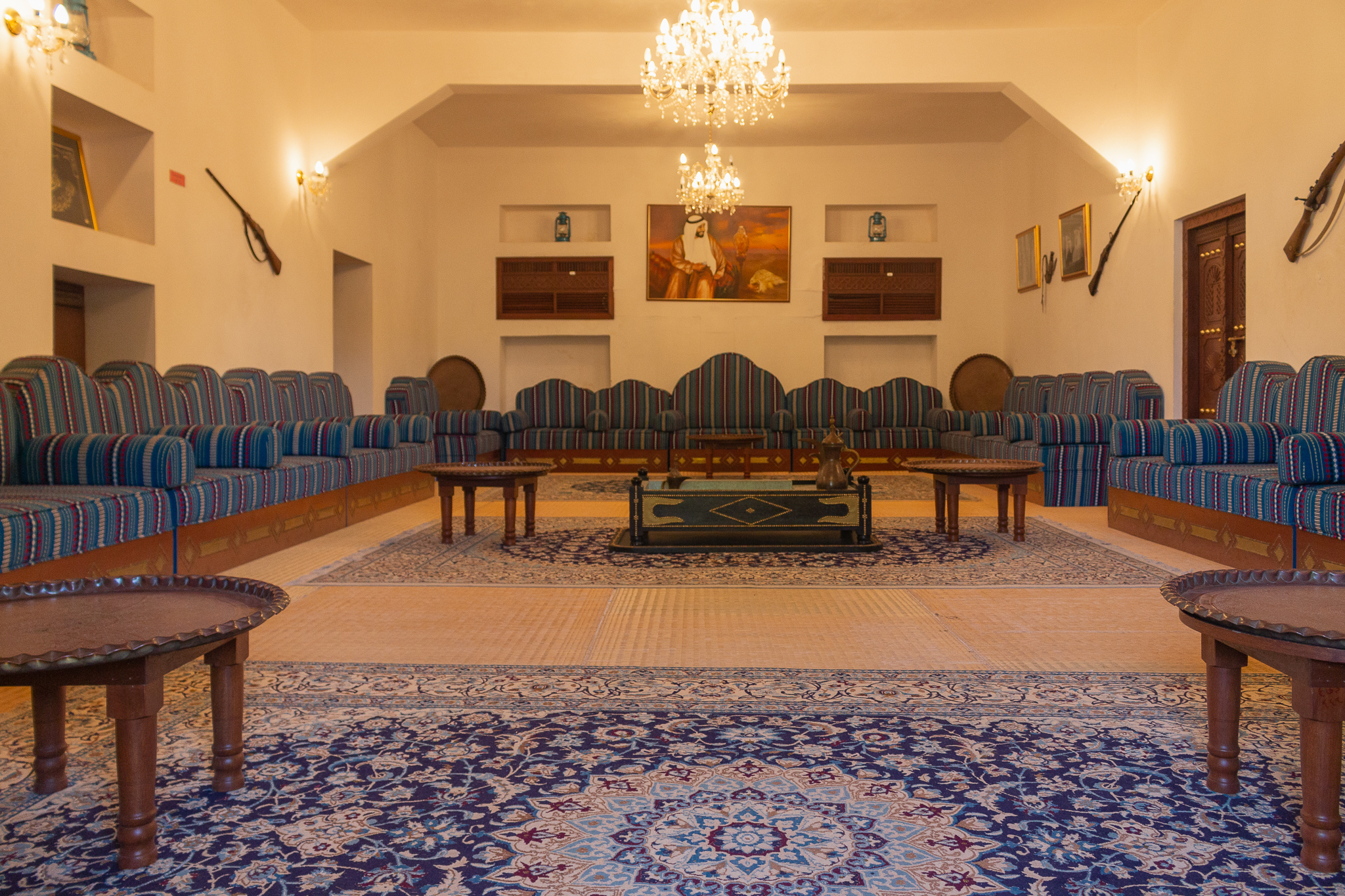
The Grand Majlis of the Sheikh Zayed Palace Museum in the United Arab Emirates

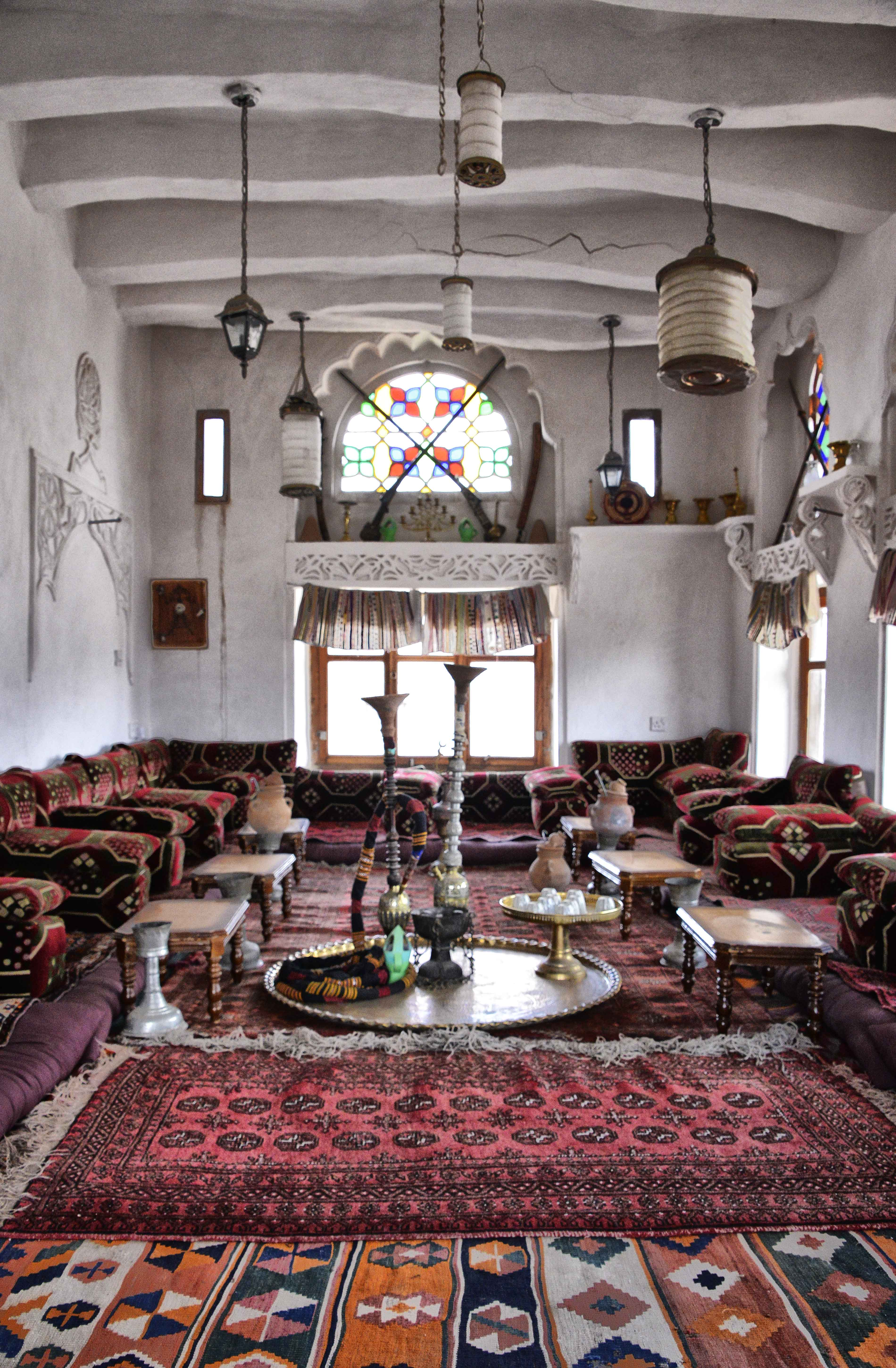
A majlis in Sanaa, 2013

Majlis is also used to refer to a private place where guests are received and entertained. The room often has cushions placed along the walls where the visitors sit, either with the cushions placed directly on the floor or upon a raised shelf. Because hospitality is taken seriously, many families take pride in making their guests comfortable during visits.

In many Arab homes, the majlis is the meeting room or front parlor used to entertain visitors. In Saudi Arabia, the decoration of the majlis in the home is often the responsibility of the women of the house, who either decorate the area themselves or barter with other women to do it for them. In Asir Province and in the neighboring Saada Governorate of Yemen, geometric designs and bright colors are used in al-Qatt Al-Asiri, a style of painting the majlis.

Sometimes public waiting rooms are also called a majlis, since this is an area where people meet and visit. Here the traditional al-qatt al-Asiri has been added to the interior design of the room. The provincial airport in Abha has recently been designed to reflect the cultural heritage of the region, an airport official said: "Abha is the first city in the Kingdom to have its airport decorated in a local-heritage style," said Provincial Airport Director Abdul Aziz Abu Harba. "The seating arrangement at the airport lounge has been in the form of a traditional majlis and the walls are painted in various colors reflecting the natural beauty of Asir."

In the Najd of Saudi Arabia, wall coverings include star shapes and other geometric designs carved into the wall covering itself. Courtyards and upper pillared porticoes are principal features of the best Nadjdi architecture, in addition to the fine incised plaster wood called jis and painted window shutters that decorate the reception rooms. Good examples of plasterwork can often be seen in the gaping ruins of torn-down buildings- the effect is light, delicate and airy. It is usually around the majlis, around the coffee hearth and along the walls above where guests sat on rugs, against cushions. Doughty wondered if this "parquetting of jis", this "gypsum fretwork... all adorning and unenclosed" originated from India. However, Najdi fretwork seems very different from that seen in the Eastern Province and in Oman, which are linked to Indian traditions, and resembles instead the motifs and patterns found in ancient Mesopotamia. The rosette, the star, the triangle and the stepped pinnacle pattern of dadoes are all ancient patterns and were found all over the Middle East in antiquity. Al-Qassim Region seems to be the home of this art, and there it is normally worked in hard white plaster, although what you see is usually begrimed by the smoke of the coffee hearth. In Riyadh, examples can be seen in unadorned clay.

== Legislatures ==
- Azerbaijan — the National Assembly is known as Milli Məclis
- Crimea (Ukraine-aligned) — Mejlis of the Crimean Tatar People
- Cyprus — Temsilciler Meclisi, Republic of Cyprus' House of Representatives
  - Northern Cyprus — Cumhuriyet Meclisi, Northern Cyprus' Assembly of the Republic
- Indonesia — The People's Consultative Assembly of Indonesia is, in Indonesian language, Majelis Permusyawaratan Rakyat (MPR)
- Iran — The Islamic Consultative Assembly is known as Majles-e Showrā-ye Eslāmī
- Iraq — The Parliament is called "Majlis an-Nuwwāb"
- Jordan — The Parliament of Jordan is known in Arabic as Majlis Al-Umma, and its lower House of Representatives is also known as Majlis Al-Nuwaab
- Kuwait — The National Assembly of Kuwait is known in Arabic as Majlis-al-Umma
- Malaysia - There are lots of meaning of Majlis in Malaysia because Malaysia is a dominant Muslim multiracial country. Malaysians often refer the word Majlis in the national Malay language to the local authorities such as the town council (Majlis Perbandaran) or the city council (Majlis Bandar Raya). The word Majlis can also refer to government agencies such as the People's Trust Council (Majlis Amanah Rakyat) among the indigenous and Bumiputra Malays, the National Security Council (Majlis Keselamatan Negara), the Malaysian Examination Council (Majlis Peperiksaan Malaysia) among local students and foreigners, and for the Muslims in the country the word Majlis often relates to Islamic affairs and customs of the Malays (Majlis Hal Ehwal Agama Islam dan Adat Istiadat) and among the nine Kings of Malaysia (Majlis Raja-Raja).
- Maldives — People's Majlis
- Oman — Majlis of Oman
- Pakistan — The Parliament of Pakistan is officially known as the Majlis-e-Shoora
- Saudi Arabia — Majlis of Saudi Arabia
- Tajikistan - the bicameral Supreme Assembly is known as the Majlisi Oli, the upper house National Assembly being known as the Majlis-i Milli, while the Assembly of Representatives, the lower house, is known as the Majlis-is Namoyandagon
- Turkey — the Grand National Assembly is known as Türkiye Büyük Millet Meclisi
- Turkmenistan — the Assembly of Turkmenistan is known as the Türkmenistanyň mejlisi
- UAE — Federal Supreme Council and Federal National Council, both called "majlis" in Arabic
- Uzbekistan — The Oliy Majlis
- Majlis Idara was the name of the administrative council of a sanjak, responsible for its general administration as part of the Ottoman Empire.
  - Majlis 'Umumi was the name of a general council of the Sanjak of Jerusalem in the Ottoman Empire, established in Jerusalem in 1913 by representatives of different qadaas with main meetings once a year to decide on a budget for the sanjak.

== Inscription on UNESCO ==
On 4 December 2015, the majlis was inscribed on UNESCO’s List of Intangible Cultural Heritage in a joint file involving the participation of the Kingdom of Saudi Arabia, United Arab Emirates, Sultanate of Oman, and Qatar. The inscription is a testament to the value of the majlis as a social and cultural function, as well as a living tradition, and secures its preservation and continuity as the seat of family, social and political gatherings throughout history.

== See also ==
- Assembly (disambiguation)
- Board of directors
- Council (disambiguation)
- Diet (assembly)
- Parliament
- Senate
