= Al-Qatt Al-Asiri =

Traditional South Arabian architectural art style

Al-Qatt Al-Asiri, female traditional interior wall decoration in Asir, Saudi Arabia
- UNESCO Intangible Cultural Heritage
- Country: Saudi Arabia
- Reference: 01261
- Region: Arab States

Inscription history
- Inscription: 2017 (12th session)
- List: Representative

Al-Qatt al-Asiri, also referred to as Nagsh or al-Zayyaan, is a style of South Arabian interior architectural art style, typically painted by women in the entrance to a home. It originated in Asir where the front parlour of traditional Arab homes typically contained wall paintings in the form of a mural or fresco with geometric designs in bright colors. Called nagash in Arabic, the wall paintings are often considered a mark of pride. In 2017, Al-Qatt Al-Asiri was inscribed on UNESCO's list of Intangible Cultural Heritage of Humanity.

== Women’s artwork ==
Women in the Asir region are traditionally responsible for plastering and painting the walls, corridors, and ceilings of their homes. A family’s wealth is often signified by the skill, color, and complexity of the paintings, with poorer homes decorated in basic, straight, simple lines in red, green, yellow, and brown. Women within the same neighborhood sometimes compete to make the most vivid and extravagant designs.

Women's artwork is heavily influenced by their love for music, their view of culture and general perception of life; for example, the artwork of more conservative women is more likely to feature conservative and modest colors.

The interior walls of the home are brightly painted, employing defined patterns of lines, triangles, squares, diagonals and tree-like patterns. The geometric designs and heavy lines seem to be adapted from the area’s textile and weaving patterns.

Women from the region sometimes sell miniature 'Asiri houses as souvenirs and bric-à-brac, which are popular among Saudi city-dwellers, who find these colorful houses a source of wonder.

== See also ==
- Qadad – Old technique used in plastering walls and cisterns
