= Lake Dumat al-Jandal =

Artificial lake in Dumat Al-Jandal, Saudi Arabia

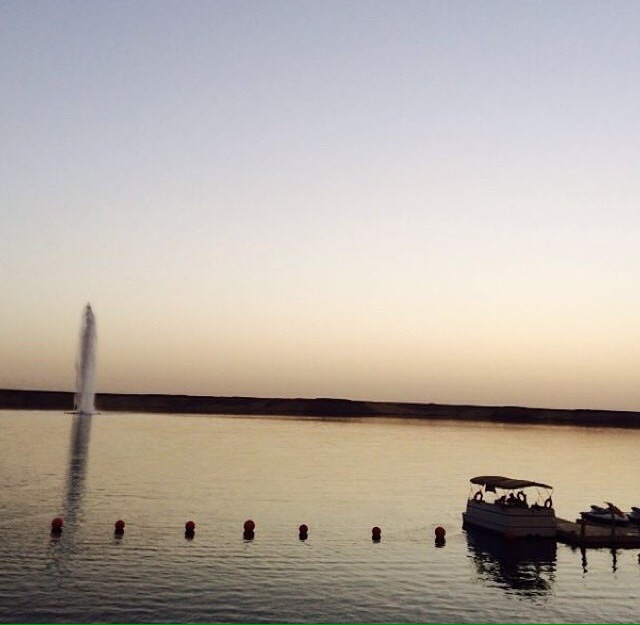
- Interactive map of Lake Dumat al-Jandal
- Location: Saudi Arabia, Dumat al-Jandal
- Coordinates: 29°48′52″N 39°54′43″E
- Type: Lake
- Basin countries: Saudi Arabia
- Surface area: 1.1 km^{2} (0.42 sq mi)
- Average depth: 15 m (49 ft)
- Water volume: 11,000,000 m^{3} (390,000,000 cu ft)
- Surface elevation: 1,928 ft (588 m)

Lake Dumat al-Jandal is an anthropogenic body of water, created in Dumat al-Jandal, Al-Jawf Province, northern Saudi Arabia, as a means of mitigating the risk of flooding caused by excess irrigation water from palm plantations. To accommodate the excess water, surface wells were constructed to facilitate its elevation and subsequent discharge over a neighboring hill, thereby forming the basis of this artificial lake. Lake Dumat al-Jandal is the largest unnatural lake in the Arabian Peninsula and the Kingdom of Saudi Arabia in particular.

== Description ==
The lake is situated on a vast expanse on the banks of the Umar ibn al-Khattab Mosque and the historic Marid Castle, encompassed by mountains on multiple sides and overlooking the western side of the Dumat al-Jandal palm trees. Lake Dumat Al-Jandal is distinguished by its location within a desert setting. The lake was formed due to the irrigation project that commenced in 1987, with the water flowing from the surrounding hills into the depression in the ground. The lake covers an estimated one million square meters and has irregular dimensions. It is fed by groundwater and excess farm water that flows into the middle of the lake.

== Development ==
The development of Lake Dumat Al-Jandal commenced in 2006, following the construction of the surrounding streets, which were paved and illuminated.

== Biological studies ==
The lake's water supply is derived from surplus agricultural irrigation in Dumat al-Jandal, an area characterized by abundant water resources. A review of the available literature indicates that the lake is situated at an elevation of 1928 feet (approximately 585 meters) above sea level. The mean temperature of the water is 18.7 degrees Celsius, with a pH level of approximately 7.4. The lake covers approximately 1.1 million square meters and has a perimeter of approximately eight kilometers, with varying depths. It supports biodiversity. The lake is home to a plethora of algae and aquatic plants, particularly among the irregularly shaped hills where species such as the shura and Typha plants flourish. A multitude of resident birds inhabit the lake, and it also attracts certain migratory bird species. There is evidence of fish and other aquatic creatures in the lake. Its storage capacity is approximately 11 million cubic meters of water annually, with an equal amount evaporating. The lake has a very high salinity level.

== See also ==
- Modon Lake
- Al-Asfar Lake
