= Sisira Well =

The Sisera well is one of the ancient wells in the Al-Jawf region in Saudi Arabia.

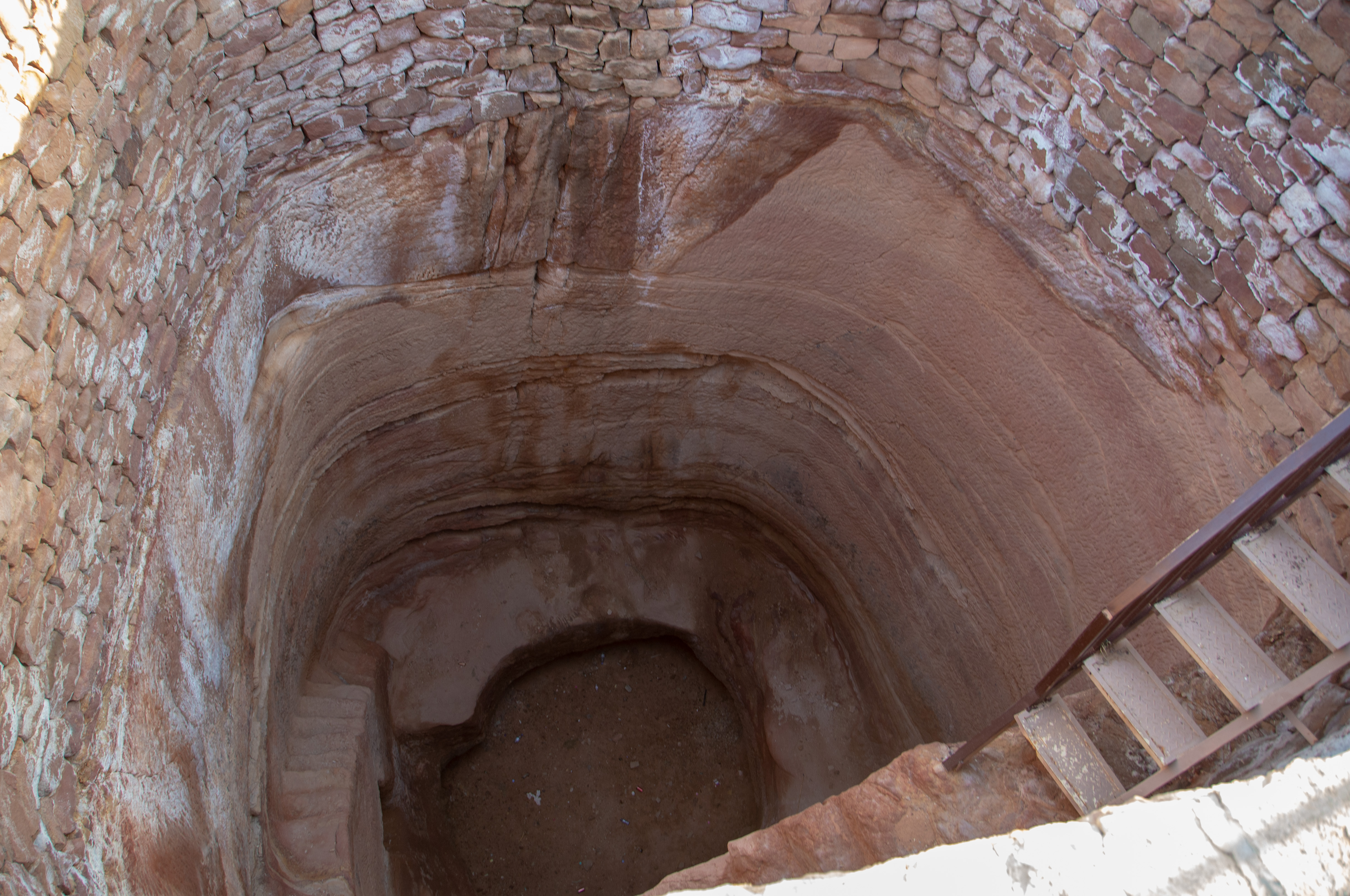
Sisra Well

== Location ==
The Sisera well is located north of Sakaka, near the Zabal Castle.

== Etymology ==
The name of the well belongs to the Canaanite military commander Sisera who fought the Jews in Palestine, and he was the commander of the Canaanite army. His name was mentioned in the biblical and Christian texts as he is an enemy of the Jews.

== Description ==
The Sisra Well is a well dug in a sandy rock, and it takes the oval shape with diameters of length 8m x 7m, with a depth of about 15m. It was carved on its inner sides stairs to its bottom. There is a channel engraved in the rock inside the well that was used to transport water to farms. This type of irrigation system was known during the Nabataean period (1st century AD). The site was restored, the well was surrounded with stems for protection, and the surrounding area was paved with stones. There is a paved road that connects to the site. In addition to its tourism integration with the site of the castle of Zaabal, the Zaabal neighborhood and the distinct way I’d digging it, this site has an archaeological and heritage importance. Al-Jouf was visited by a scientist called Professor Winnett and his colleague Reed in 1962 AD. They said: "This well is like a pond in the pocket in Palestine. It is known that some of the low areas in Sakaka surrounding the well from the eastern and southern sides were supplied of water from the well through underground tunnels, as well as through channels that exist on the ground, and carved into the rock. Some parts of these tunnels were discovered accidentally after they were covered in sand."

== Gallery ==

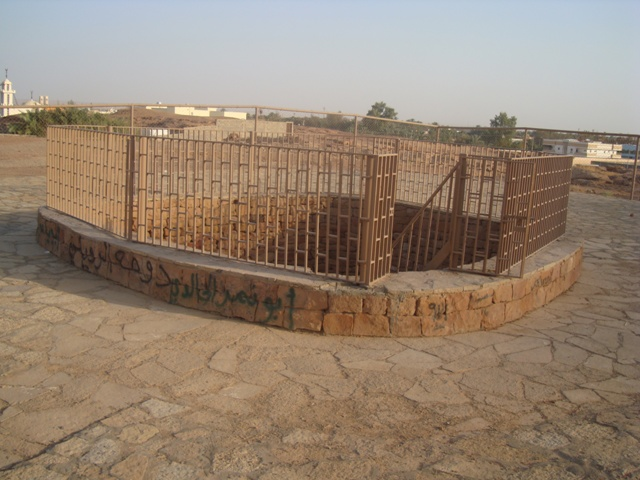

== See also ==
- Al-Jawf
- Sakaka
- Columns of Rajajil
