= Sakaka, Saudi Arabia =

Sakakah سَكَاكَا
- City
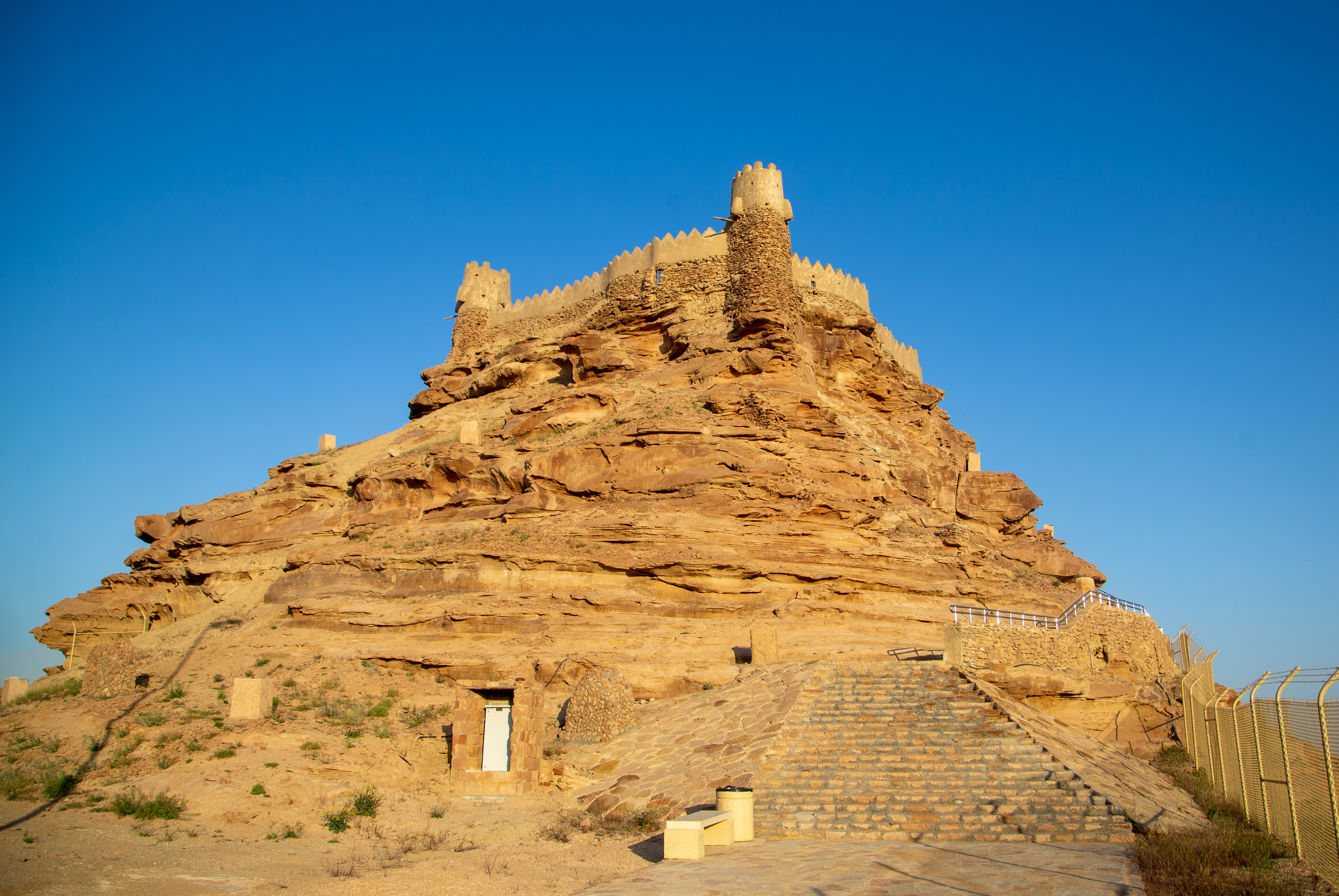
- Zabal Castle

- Location in Saudi Arabia
- Coordinates: 29°58′11″N 040°12′00″E
- Country: Saudi Arabia
- Province: Al-Jouf
- First settled: 3rd-2nd millennium BC

Area
  - City: 100 km^{2} (39 sq mi)
  - Urban: 475 km^{2} (183 sq mi)
  - Metro: 9,420 km^{2} (3,640 sq mi)
- Elevation: 566 m (1,857 ft)

Population (2022 census)
  - City: 204,174
  - Density: 2,000/km^{2} (5,300/sq mi)
  - Urban: 241,669(Sakakah governorate)
  - Metro: 296,010

Sakākā, often spelled Sakakah (Arabic: سَكَاكَا) is a city in northwestern Saudi Arabia which is the capital of Al-Jawf Province. It is located at 650 metres (2,130 feet) above sea level just to the north of the An Nafud desert. Sakakah had a population of 204,174 at the 2022 census.

== History ==
Sakaka is considered one of the oldest inhabited sites within the Arabian Peninsula, with settlement dating back at least 4,000 years. The wider Al Jawf Region is referenced in Akkadian inscriptions of the Neo-Assyrian Empire dating to the 9th to 7th centuries BC, in which the nearby city of Dumat al-Jandal (then known as Adummatu) is described as the stronghold of the Arabians.

Sakaka is an oasis town on an ancient caravan route across the Arabian Peninsula, which ran from the Mediterranean coast and Mesopotamia to the central and southern parts of the peninsula.

The 19th-century English traveller Lady Anne Blunt described Sakaka as a town "with an old castle perched at an altitude of about 100 feet" overlooking the city — a reference to Zabal Castle. The Finnish orientalist Georg August Wallin similarly recorded that Sakaka contained "a ruined fortress known as Zaʻbal" and "four neighbourhoods or markets."

=== Historical places ===
Sakaka is the home of historic & prehistoric archaeological sites such as Zabal Castle, Sisira Well and Hadra Cave or Hudrah Cave, a small rock shelter under a prominent overhang whose front ledge contains some petroglyphs and Arabic writing. The Umar ibn al-Khattab Mosque and Marid Castle, located in Dowmat Al-Jandal. The Camel Site, a small sandstone spurs located about 8 km north-east of Sakaka, contains panels with low-relief engravings of near-life-size dromedaries and equids. There are also the ancient Rajajil standing stones near Sakaka, dating back nearly 6,000 years.

== Modernization ==
In recent years, the Saudi government has been providing more seed capital to Al-Jawf region, especially in Sakaka in hopes of developing the economically starved region of the kingdom. For this reason, the city has new government buildings, schools and hospitals and are built adjacent to crumbling ruins of older buildings. One major feature of the city is the rapidly expanding Al Jouf University (Jami'at Al-Jawf), founded in 2005. Sakaka is a small but expanding city with much construction in progress. It has three major hospitals: King Abdul Aziz Specialist Hospital, Prince Mutaib Hospital and child and maternity care hospital. There is a newly established Oncology Center and a Cardiac Center. A big ongoing project is the 1,000-bed Prince Muhammed Bin Abdulaziz Medical City which is under construction.

== Education ==
The King hopes that Al Jouf University will become a pillar of social, cultural, and intellectual advancement in Saudi Arabia. There are several government-run schools and some private schools. The city has three English schools, Sakaka International School, which is an international, mostly Egyptian School and has an American curriculum, the other Al-Jouf International school with British curriculum and the third one is Al Motaqadimah International School with American curriculum.

== Transportation ==
The city is served by Al-Jawf Airport which has domestic flights and International flights to some of the major cities in the Middle East. Saudi Arabia Railways also has a station in Sakakah on its Riyadh–Qurayyat line.

Services at Jouf station
- Preceding station	Saudi Arabia Railways	Following station
  Qurayyat Terminus	Riyadh–Qurayyat	Ḥaʼil towards Riyadh North Station

== Agriculture ==
Al-Jawf is notable for its abundant agricultural water, making possible the cultivation of dates (200,000 palms) and olives (12,000,000 trees), as well as other agricultural products. Farms number around 16,000, and agricultural projects around 1,500. It is the home to agribusiness farms such as Watania Farms, the largest organic farm in the kingdom. The fertile agricultural land of Al-Jawf is due largely to underground water, which drew delegates of King Abdul Aziz. They were sent to the town of Sakaka and Dumat Al-Jandal and Qurayat, requesting resident tribes there to join the nascent kingdom. Sakaka is home to many Saudi families that can proudly trace their lineage to a few large, old tribes that have dominated the area since time immemorial.

== Climate ==
The Köppen-Geiger climate classification system classifies its climate as hot desert (BWh).

Climate data for Sakakah (1991–2020)
Month	Jan	Feb	Mar	Apr	May	Jun	Jul	Aug	Sep	Oct	Nov	Dec	Year
Record high °C (°F)	30.3 (86.5)	32.6 (90.7)	37.2 (99.0)	40.4 (104.7)	43.9 (111.0)	45.4 (113.7)	47.7 (117.9)	47.2 (117.0)	45.2 (113.4)	41.4 (106.5)	37.5 (99.5)	30.0 (86.0)	47.7 (117.9)
Mean daily maximum °C (°F)	16.2 (61.2)	19.0 (66.2)	23.7 (74.7)	29.5 (85.1)	34.7 (94.5)	38.8 (101.8)	40.5 (104.9)	41.1 (106.0)	38.2 (100.8)	32.4 (90.3)	23.3 (73.9)	18.0 (64.4)	29.6 (85.3)
Daily mean °C (°F)	10.0 (50.0)	12.5 (54.5)	17.0 (62.6)	22.6 (72.7)	27.9 (82.2)	31.6 (88.9)	33.4 (92.1)	33.6 (92.5)	30.7 (87.3)	25.2 (77.4)	16.8 (62.2)	11.6 (52.9)	22.7 (72.9)
Mean daily minimum °C (°F)	4.5 (40.1)	6.4 (43.5)	10.2 (50.4)	15.4 (59.7)	20.4 (68.7)	23.7 (74.7)	25.6 (78.1)	25.8 (78.4)	23.0 (73.4)	18.2 (64.8)	11.2 (52.2)	6.1 (43.0)	15.9 (60.6)
Record low °C (°F)	−6.0 (21.2)	−7.0 (19.4)	0.0 (32.0)	1.0 (33.8)	11.0 (51.8)	15.0 (59.0)	17.0 (62.6)	18.8 (65.8)	12.0 (53.6)	6.5 (43.7)	−1.4 (29.5)	−4.4 (24.1)	−7.0 (19.4)
Average precipitation mm (inches)	13.4 (0.53)	7.9 (0.31)	6.5 (0.26)	3.1 (0.12)	1.8 (0.07)	0.1 (0.00)	0.0 (0.0)	0.1 (0.00)	0.5 (0.02)	4.5 (0.18)	12.8 (0.50)	9.7 (0.38)	60.3 (2.37)
Average precipitation days (≥ 1mm)	1.9	1.6	1.3	0.7	0.6	0.0	0.0	0.2	0.1	0.9	1.8	1.5	10.5
Average relative humidity (%)	57	45	35	27	19	15	16	16	19	28	41	53	31
Source: World Meteorological Organization, Jeddah Regional Climate Center (humidity 1985-2010)

== Gallery ==
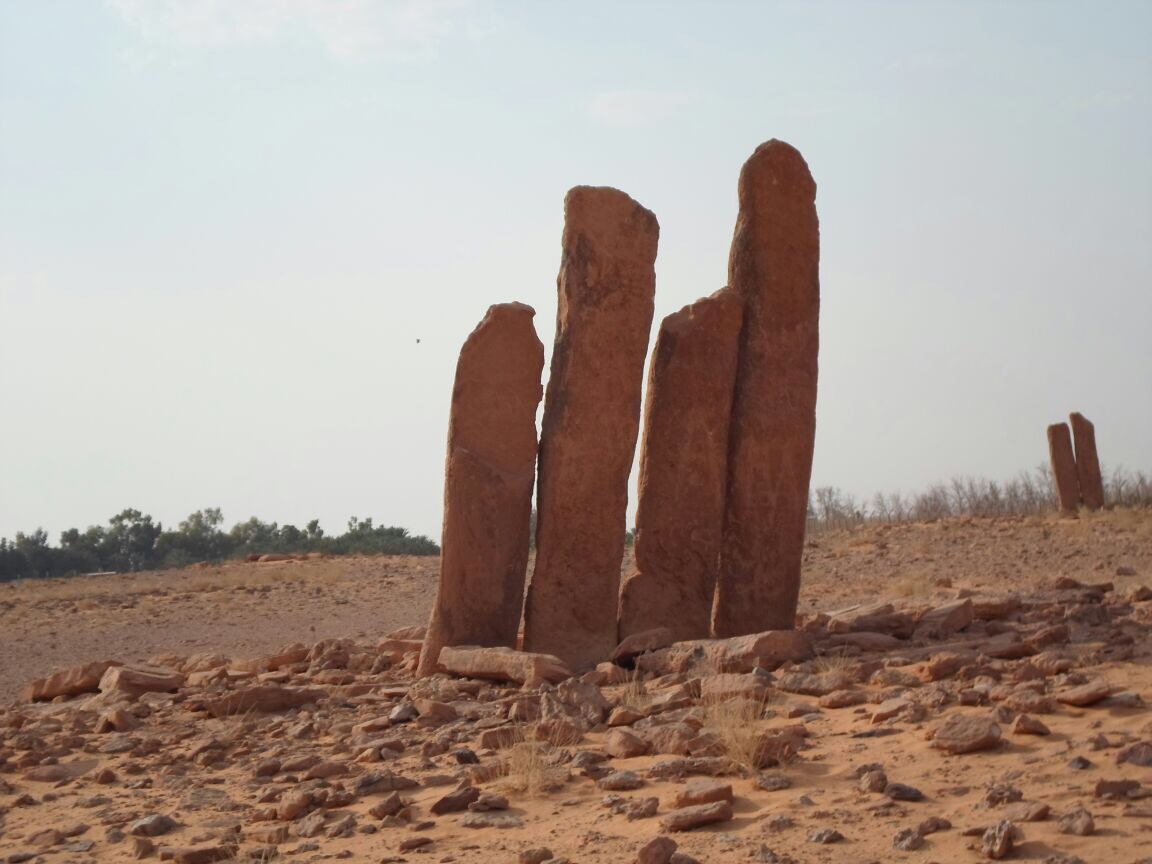
Rajajil standing stones

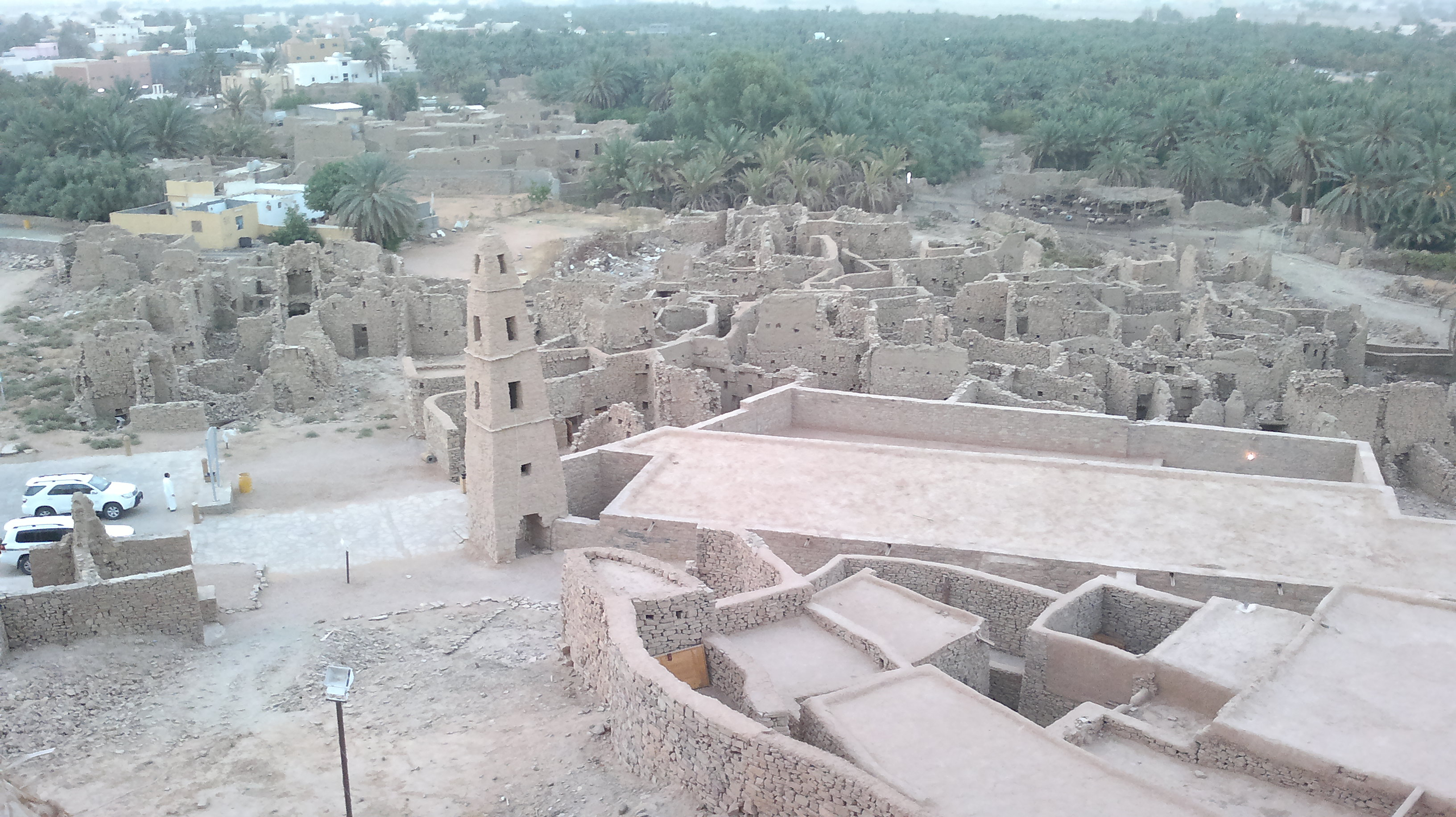
Omar Mosque in Dumat Al-Jandal

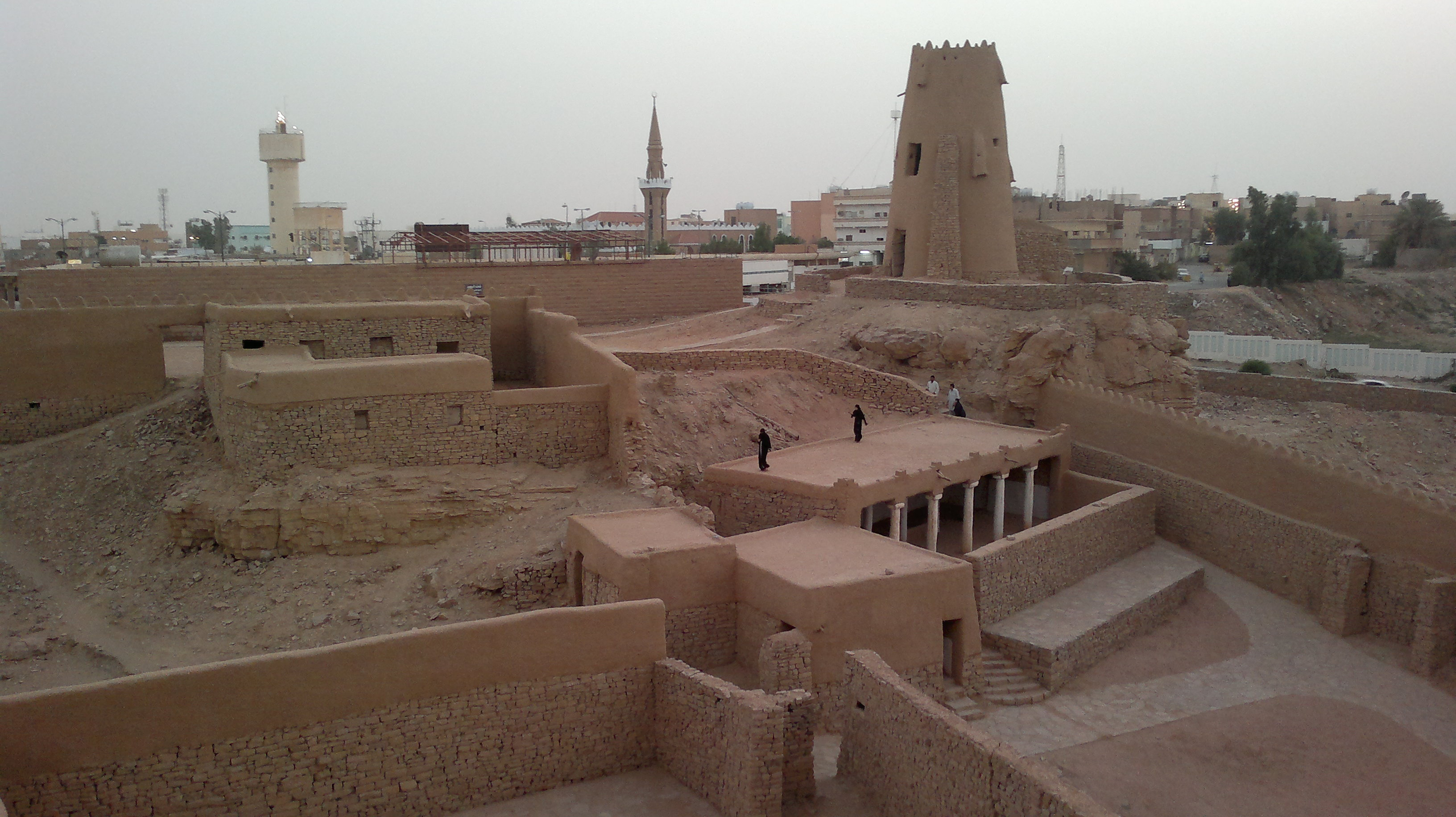
Mard Castle in Dumat Al-Jandal

== See also ==
- List of cities and towns in Saudi Arabia
- Sirhan Valley
