= Al-Asfar Lake =

- Location within Saudi Arabia
- Location: Saudi Arabia
- Coordinates: 25.529°N 49.800°E
- Type: lake
- Designation

UNESCO World Heritage Site
- Part of: Al-Ahsa Oasis, an Evolving Cultural Landscape
- Criteria: Cultural: iii, iv, v
- Reference: 1563-009
- Inscription: 2018 (42nd Session)

Al-Asfar Lake (Arabic: بحيرة الأصفر, Buḥayrat al-Aṣfar, meaning "Yellow Lake") is a lake located east of Umran City in the Al-Ahsa Governorate in Eastern Saudi Arabia. It covers an area of approximately 20.8 square kilometers (20,800,000 m²).

The lake is surrounded by sand dunes and is somewhat difficult to reach. Al-Asfar Lake is one of the most important wetland shallow lakes in the region. The lake is a historic landmark of Al-Hasa, and was mentioned by some historians of the Abbasid and Islamic Golden Era, such as Al-Hamawi, Al-Qalqashandi, and Al-Zamakhshari. At present, the primary source of the lake's water is agricultural drainage water, which leads some people to refer to it as semi man-made. In 2019, Al-Asfar Lake was declared a national nature reserve.

== History ==
The lake has been mentioned by several historians such as Al-Hamawi and Al-Qalqashandi. The lake is also mentioned by Al-Zamakhshari in his book "Kitab al-Amkinah wa al-Jibal wa al-Miyah ", where he describes it as peaceful lake at gates of Al-Hasa. Al-Zamakhshari suggests that the naming of the historical region of Bahrayn (which includes Eastern Arabia and Bahrain and in English means the "two seas") comes from its location between The Green Sea and a peaceful lake at Al-hasa.

== Wildlife ==
Different parts of the lake reflect different type of shores, including wet, moist, semi-dry and dry zones. The different zones may have different plant species. At least 39 plant species belonging to 20 families can be identified around the lake. Fluctuating water level create very diverse conditions, which increases the number and types of vegetation and plant species. Fluctuating water levels allow some vegetation types to regenerate from buried seeds.

Al-Asfar Lake attract migratory birds twice a year. Birds migrate from cooler places such as Russia, Canada, India and Iran to warmer climate areas including Al-Asfar Lake. The range of birds varies from small birds such as Sparrows to large birds such as geese and ducks.

== Environmental concerns ==
The lake water is contaminated with heavy metals, which mainly come from agricultural water. The heavy-metal level is generally higher than the international permissible limits and varies seasonally.

== UNESCO site ==
In 2018, Al-Ahsa Oasis became the fifth Saudi site to be registered as a UNESCO World Heritage Site. Al-Asfar lake is one of 12 sites that were designated as World Heritage Site within Al-Ahsa.

== See also ==
- Lake Dumat al-Jandal
- Modon Lake
