= Marid Castle =

Castle in Dumat Al-Jandal, Saudi Arabia

Coordinates: 29°48′41″N 39°52′02″E

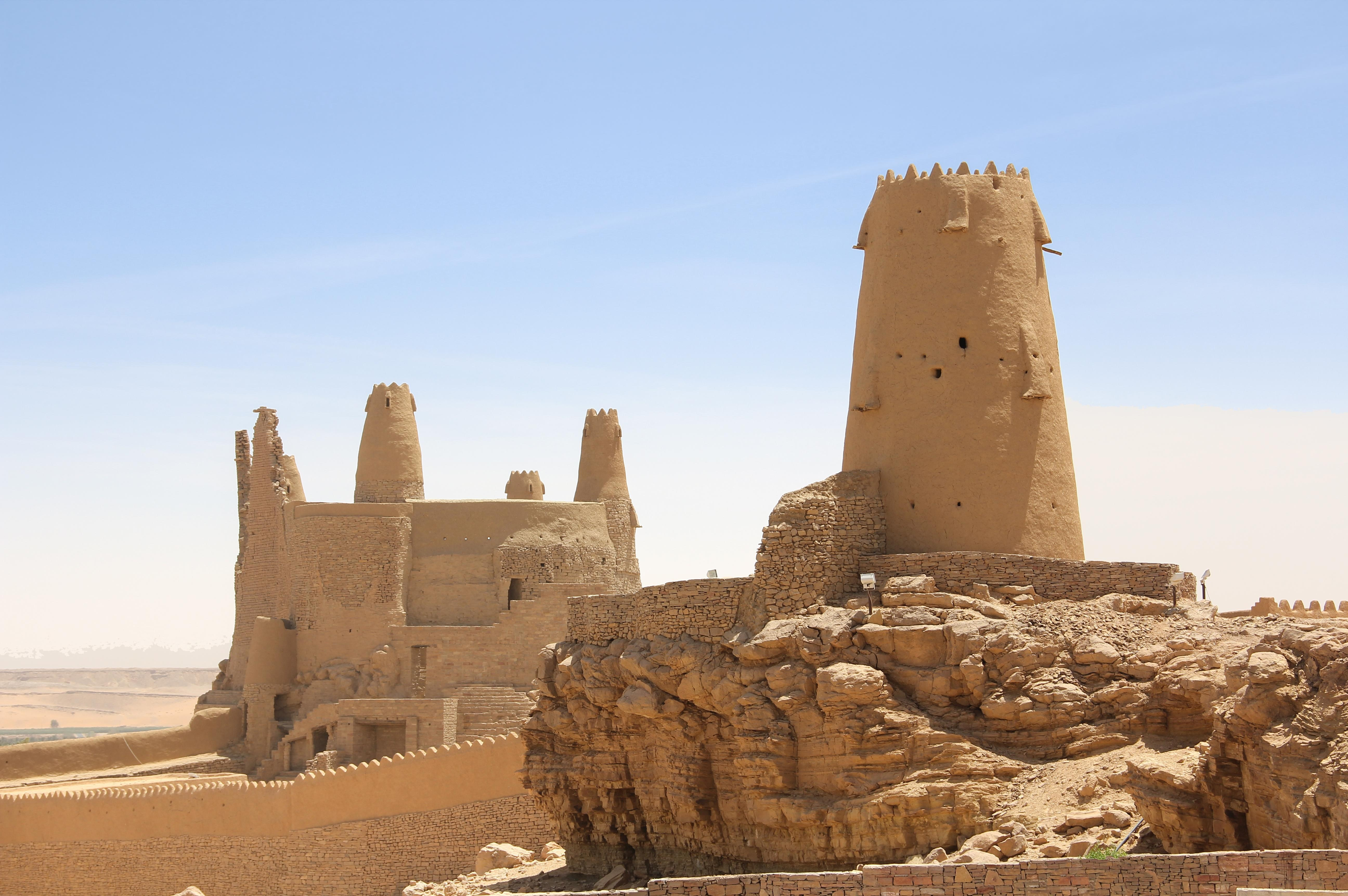
The Marid Castle in 2019

Marid Castle (Arabic: قَصْر مَارِد, Qaṣr Mārid, literally "the rebellious castle") is a historic military fortress located in the city of Dumat al-Jandal in the Al-Jawf region of Saudi Arabia, about 50 km from Sakaka. Built in the first century AD on the basis of Roman–Nabataean pottery recovered during excavations, the castle was first mentioned in the third century in connection with Queen Zenobia's campaign against Dumat al-Jandal and Tayma, when her troops were unable to capture the fortress.

== Etymology ==
The castle of Marid takes its name from the Arabic root meaning "rebellious," in reference to its successful defiance of those who attempted to storm it, as recorded by the medieval geographer Yaqut al-Hamawi.

== Location ==
The castle stands on a hill rising about 620 metres above sea level and overlooks the city of Dumat al-Jandal in the Al-Jawf region from the western side. Its elevated position contributed to its defensive importance, allowing the garrison to observe all parts of the town and any approaching party from a considerable distance.

== History ==
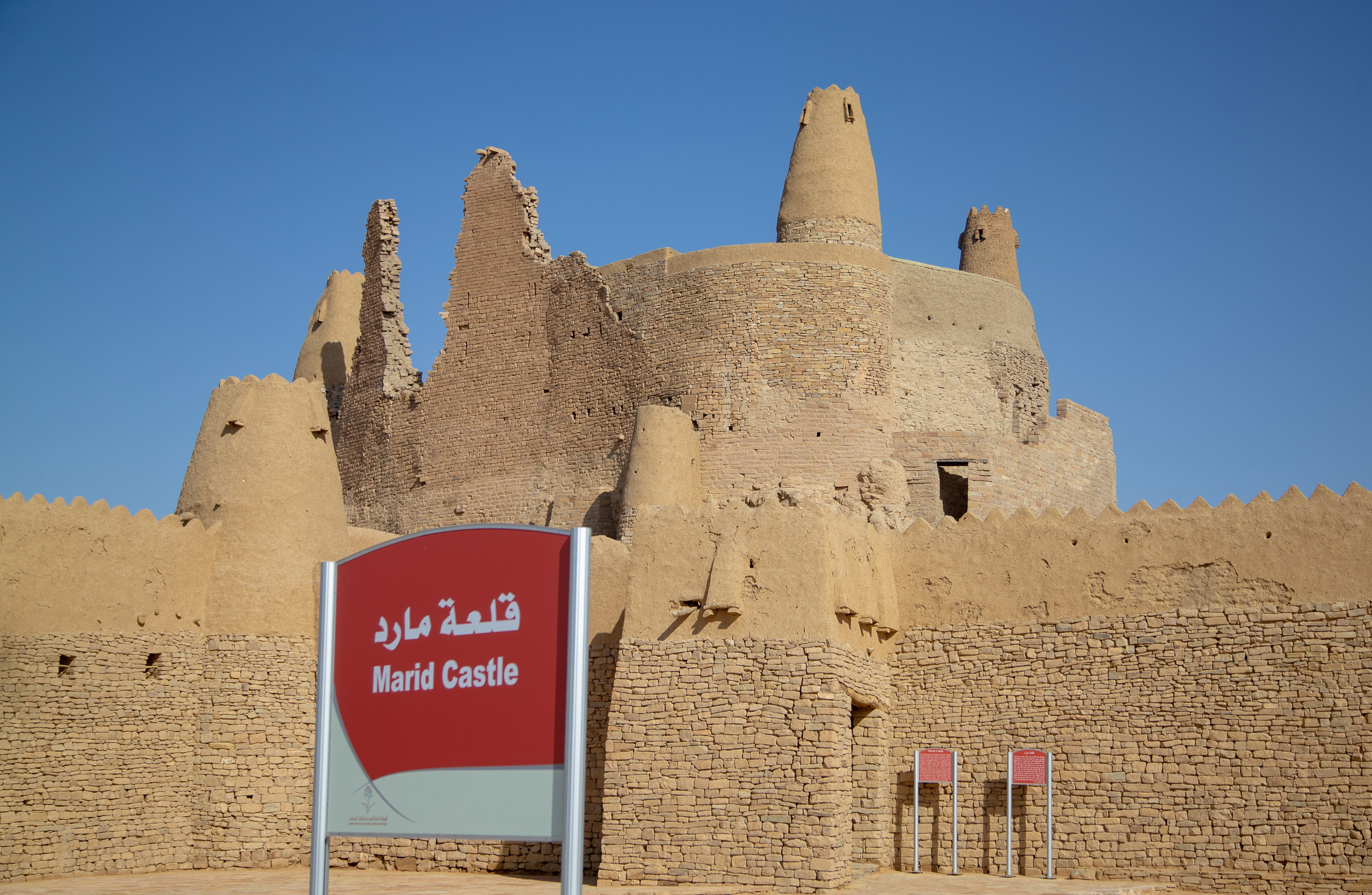
The entrance of the castle

Marid Fortress is generally dated to the 1st century AD on the basis of Roman–Nabataean pottery recovered during excavations. The earliest written mention of the castle dates to the third century AD, when Queen Zenobia of Palmyra is reported to have besieged Dūmat al-Jandal (then known as Adummatu) and Tayma without being able to capture the fortress. According to the medieval geographer Yaqut al-Hamawi, Zenobia is said to have remarked, "Marid has rebelled, and Ablaq has glorified" — Ablaq being the fortress at Tayma.

In 633 CE, Khalid ibn al-Walid annexed Dumat al-Jandal to the newly formed Islamic empire.

In 1853, Ha'il governor Talal Ibn Rashid damaged the castle with two cannons.

In 1909, Nawwaf Ibn Sha'lan besieged the castle for ten months before wresting control of it from the Rashids.

Restoration work on parts of the castle was carried out between AH 1416 and AH 1423 (AD 1995/6–2002/3), alongside a mosque restoration project covering parts of the Al-Daraa neighborhood. The works included consolidation of facades, entrances and corridors, the installation of wooden ceilings of tamarisk stems in the corridors, and the application of layers of moisture insulation.

In 2018, the Saudi Commission for Tourism and National Heritage (SCTH) launched a further project to repair the castle, in the framework of which a café and a traditional restaurant were established within the complex.

== Description ==
The castle was originally rectangular in plan but is now oval in shape. It can be entered through two main gates, one to the south and one to the north, the latter adjoining a tower.

The castle has two storeys: the lower built in stone and the upper in mudbrick. Four conical towers, each approximately 12 metres in height, were built at different periods. Inside the castle are two wells, and the floors contain rooms used by the garrison for guard duty, shooting positions and observation.

The castle is enclosed by a large outer stone wall pierced by numerous openings for observation. This outer wall has two gates, one to the south and the other to the north.

Visitors typically take about 30 minutes to ascend the castle hill, which is reached by a winding stair of approximately 1,000 steps.

== Excavation and dating ==
Excavations at Marid Castle, both inside and outside the structure, have brought to light layers of pottery and other finds dating to the Nabataean period, establishing the castle's foundations as Nabataean in origin. Documented finds include:

- The castle foundations
- Nabataean material in different parts of Dumat al-Jandal
- A group of Nabataean cemeteries at the site of Sanaymiyat, west of Dumat al-Jandal
- Wall remains of the castle

In 1976, excavations revealed Nabataean and Roman ceramics dated to the 1st and 2nd centuries AD, with further excavation completed east of the castle and outer wall.

Excavations carried out by Khaleel Ibrahim Al-Moaqil in 1986 confirmed the 1976 findings: a homogeneous layer of Roman–Nabataean pottery sherds indicated a prosperous community during the Nabataean period, to whose realm the region probably belonged.

== Nearby ancient sites ==
Several other ancient sites lie in the immediate vicinity of the castle, including the Umar ibn al-Khattab Mosque, the old market of Dumat al-Jandal, the historical Al-Darʿi neighborhood, and the city wall.

== Gallery ==
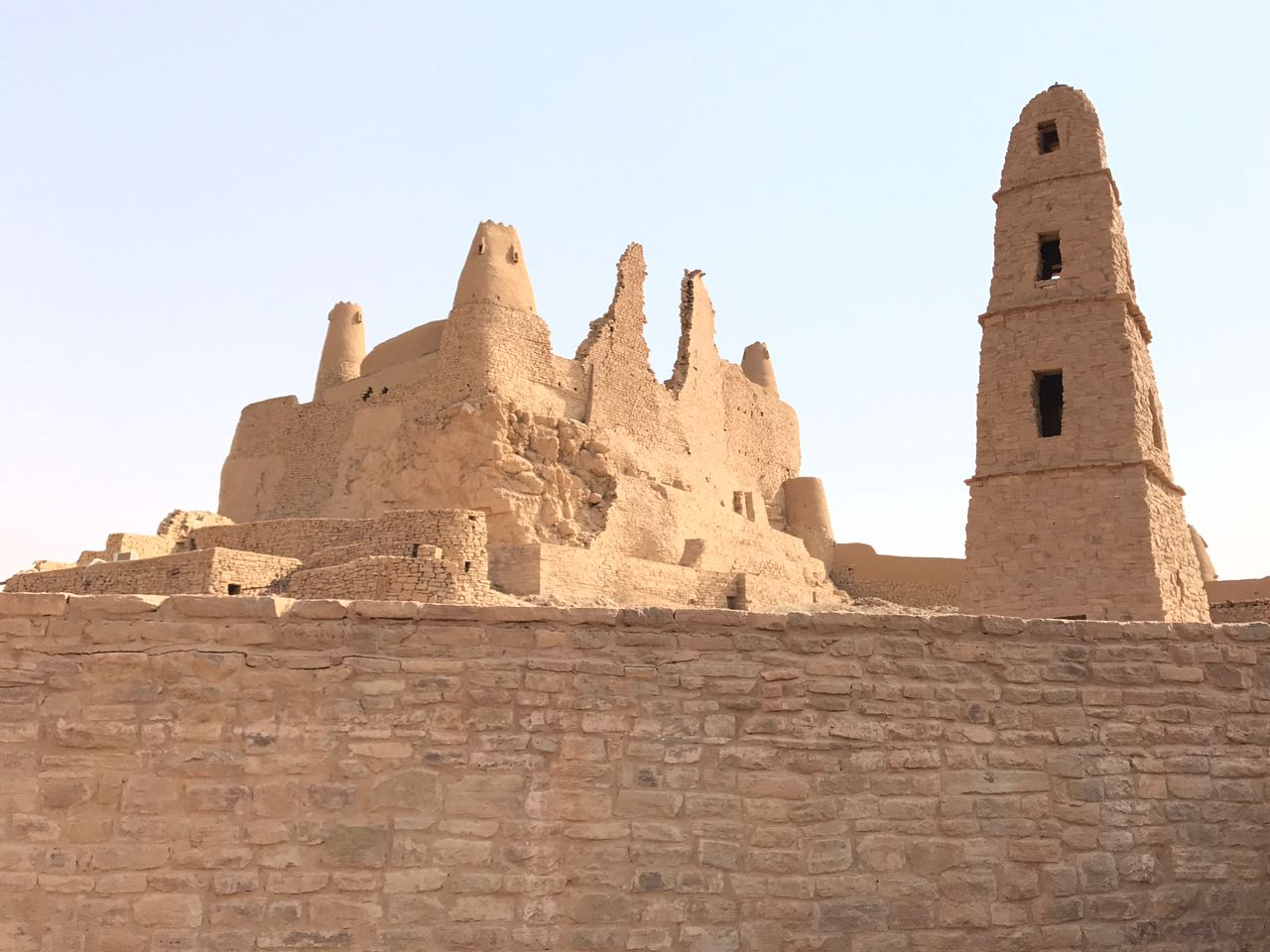
Omar ibn al-Khattab Mosque with its minaret and the castle in the background

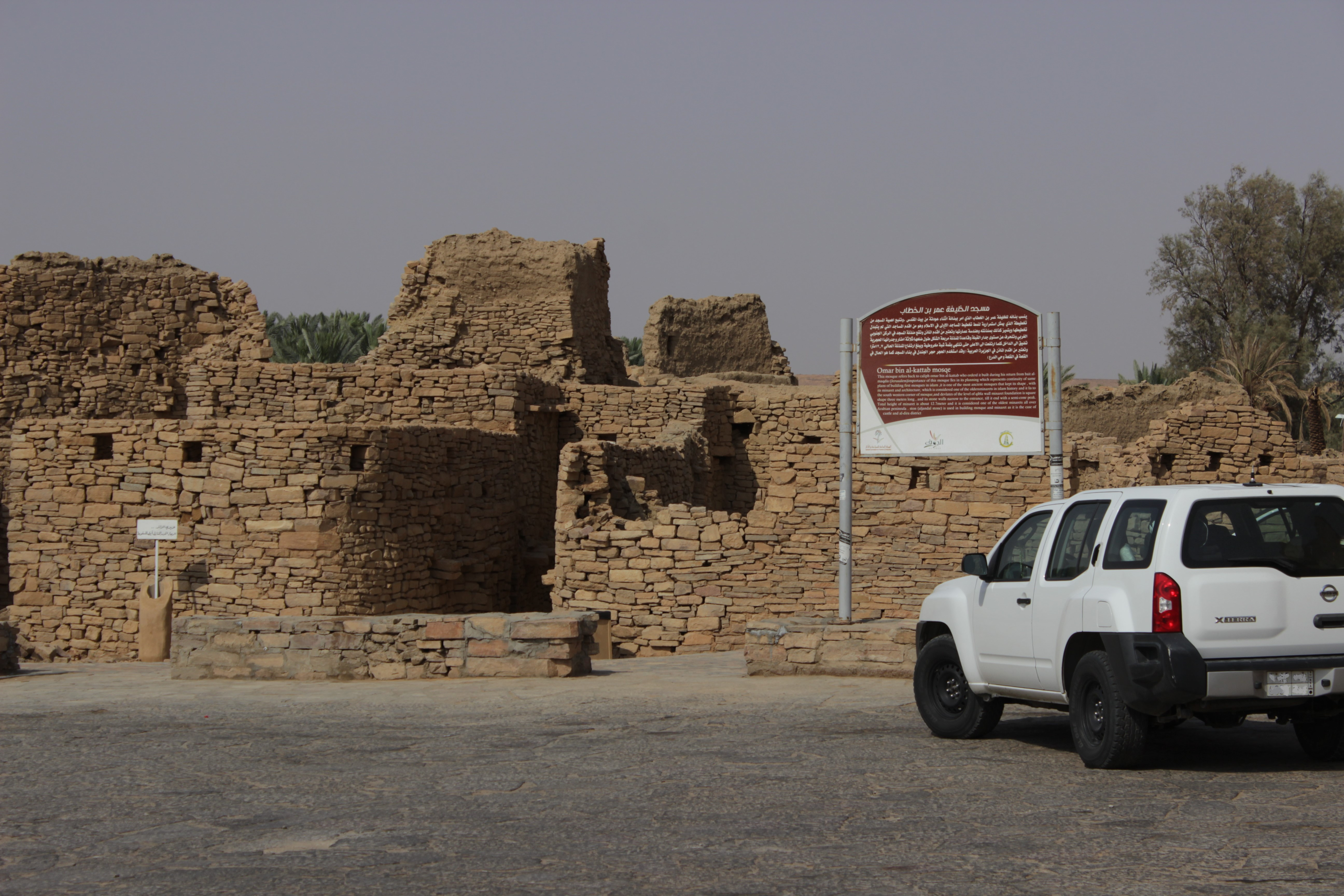
Omar ibn al-Khattab Mosque

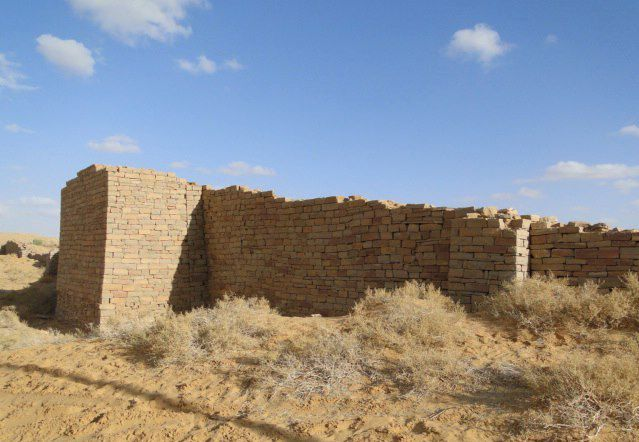
Dumat al-Jandal's city wall

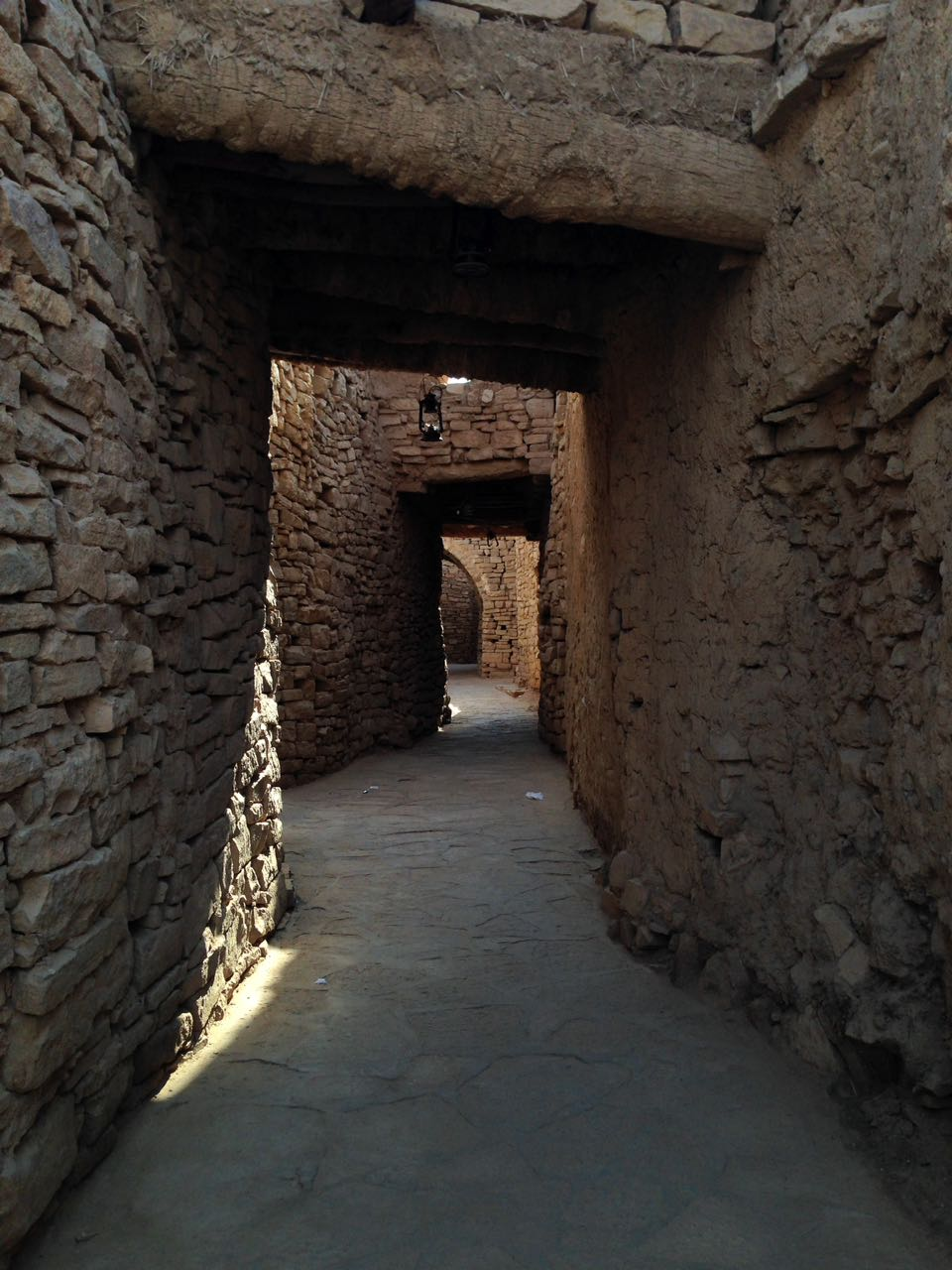
Old Dumat al-Jandal, the Al-Dar'i quarter
Mard Castle

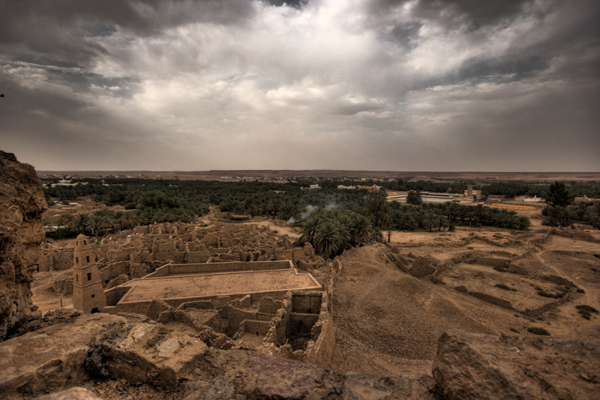
The old city of Adumato

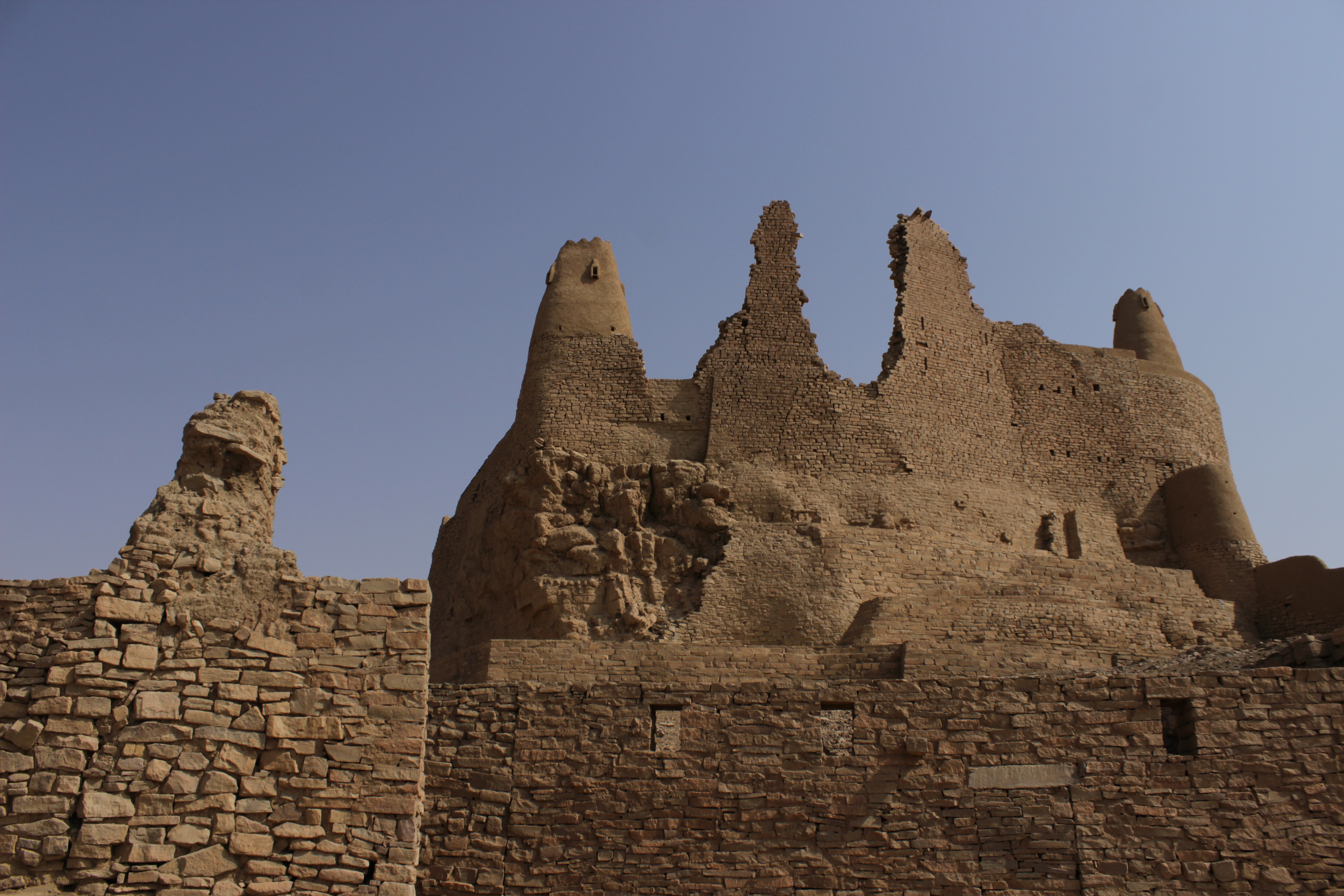

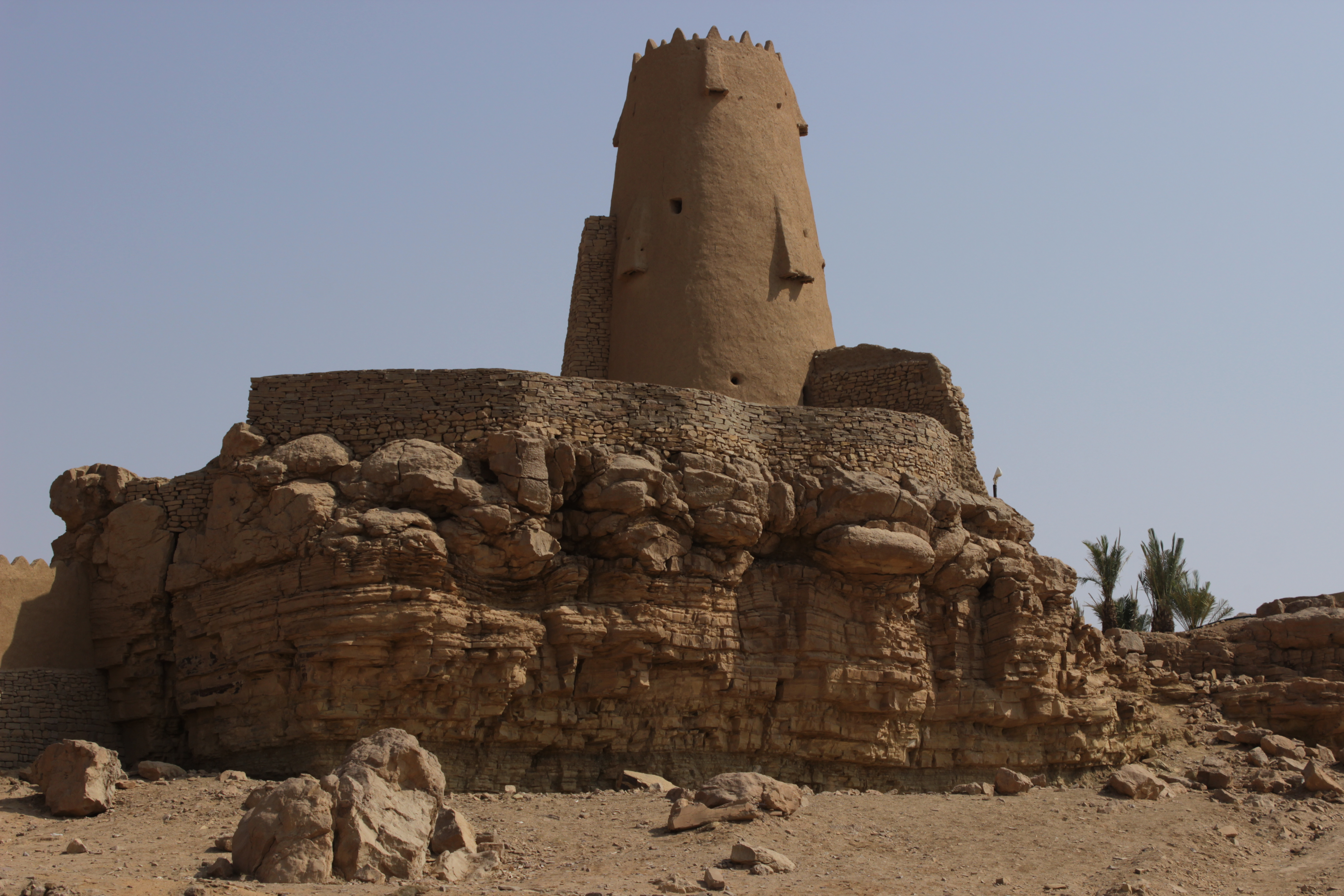

== See also ==
- List of castles in Saudi Arabia
- Lake Dumat al-Jandal
- Tourism in Saudi Arabia
