= Tabarjal =

Place in Al-Jawf, Saudi Arabia

Coordinates: 30°30′N 38°13′E

Tabarjal طبرجل
- City
- Interactive map of Tabarjal
- Country: Saudi Arabia
- Province: Al-Jawf Province
- Governorate: Tabarjal Governorate

Population (2022)
  - Total: 78,662
- Time zone: UTC+3 (AST)

Tabarjal (Arabic:طبرجل) is an important town in northern Saudi Arabia. The nearest big city is Qurayyat. Tabarjal is one of the major modern towns in the region of Al-Jawf, where it has for over forty years organized the settlement project and dug wells. The population number was 78,354 at the 2022 census. Tabarjal Governorate had 109,796 inhabitants in the same year.

== Geography ==
Tabarjal is situated in northwestern Saudi Arabia in Al-Jawf Province, a sparsely populated region bordering Jordan. The city lies in a desert environment, where agricultural use depends heavily on groundwater extraction and artificial irrigation.

== History ==
The modern development of Tabarjal is relatively recent. The area was traditionally part of the northern desert and steppe regions of Arabia, where nomadic and semi-nomadic ways of life predominated. Later urban development was strongly influenced by state settlement and agricultural programmes, which in the second half of the 20th century aimed at the exploitation of groundwater and the conversion of desert land into farmland.

As a result, Tabarjal developed into a planned agricultural and settlement centre. The expansion of the city proceeded in parallel with the increasing use of irrigation; analysis of Landsat imagery shows a marked increase in circular irrigated fields in the surrounding area since the 1980s. Tabarjal thus illustrates the transformation of some Saudi desert areas through state-supported agricultural development.

== Demographics ==
At the 2022 census, Tabarjal had a population of 78,662. Saudi citizens accounted for 80 percent of the town's population.

Year	Population
2004	39,248
2010	48,525
2022	78,662

== Economy ==
Tabarjal's economy is strongly agricultural. The surrounding area is one of the important agricultural zones of Al-Jawf Province. Large-scale irrigated agriculture is based mainly on deep wells and center-pivot irrigation systems, which water circular fields in the desert. This form of agriculture was expanded in Saudi Arabia especially from the 1980s onward and was intended to increase national food production. The region produces grapes, figs, peaches, apricots, pears, pistachios, pomegranates and other agricultural products.

== Etymology ==
Tabarjal may be named for a traveling merchant named Jaloud who is believed to have died in the surrounding area between 650 and 750 A.D.

== See also ==
- List of cities and towns in Saudi Arabia
- Agriculture in Saudi Arabia
