= Zabal Castle =

Castle in Saudi Arabia

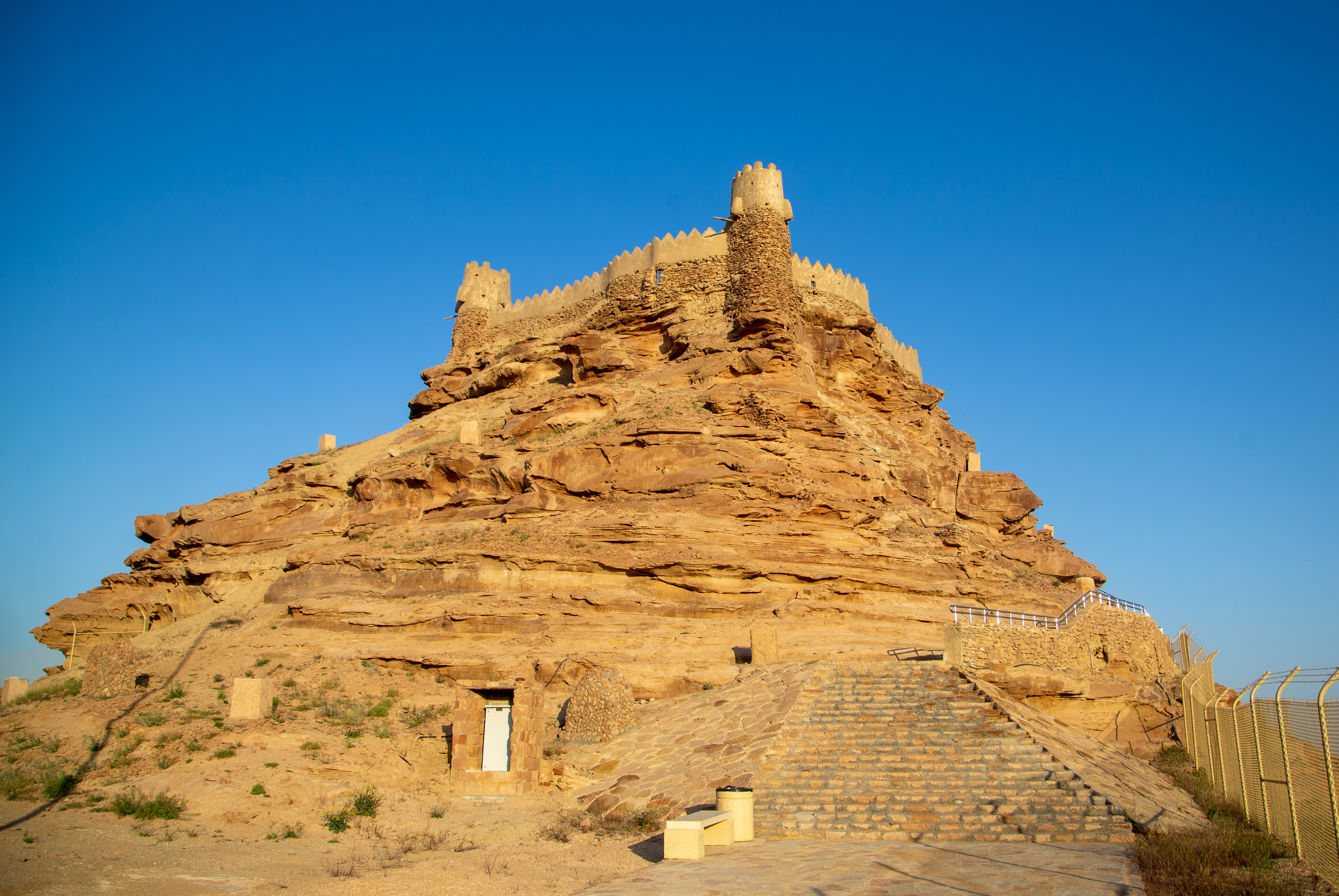
- A view of the castle appearing on the mountain

- Location within Saudi Arabia
- Interactive map of Zabal Castle
- 29.990456°N 40.19803°E

Zabal Castle (Arabic: قلعة زعبل, ALA-LC: Qal'at Zaʻbal ) is a castle in the north of the city of Sakaka in the Al-Jouf region in the north of Saudi Arabia.

== Location ==
Zabal Castle stands on a hilltop at the north-western edge of Sakaka. Its outer wall is built of stone and clay, with four corner towers, and the structure is reached by a single winding road. The castle's defensive position and difficult approach allowed it to serve as the guardian of the oasis settlement below for several centuries.

== History ==
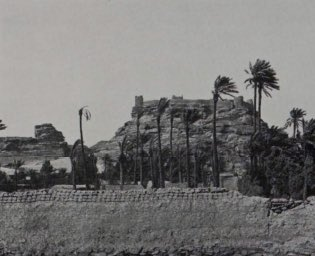
An old picture of the castle

The age of the Za’abal Fort is about 900 years. While the age of the current fort is about 400 years. Probably the building was built on the old building ruins, which goes back to the Nabataean. Beside the fort, there is Sisira Well. The well is carved by the rock, and its goes back to the Nabataean Times. However, inside the well there is a stairs to go down. Then, at the bottom of the well there is a crevice, which helps to conveyance the water to the whole city. At the end, the well link Al-Qasr area with Al-Laqa’et area, by a tunnel underground. While in the west side of the mountain there is the Prince Mountain which contain inscription and rock charges.

== Description ==
Sheikh Hamad Al-Jasser wrote: "This fort has no mention of our sources, and its effects indicate that it was built before Islam, and it is like the guardian of a large area of the country of the hollow is Skaka and its proximity to the farms and villages scattered in a wide range of land. English writer Lady Anne Blunt also wrote: "Skaka Al jouf, with an old castle perched at an altitude of about 100 feet, controls the city." Finnish traveller Georg August Wallin said: "Skaka has a ruined fortress known as Zaabal, and there are also four neighborhoods or markets."

== Gallery ==
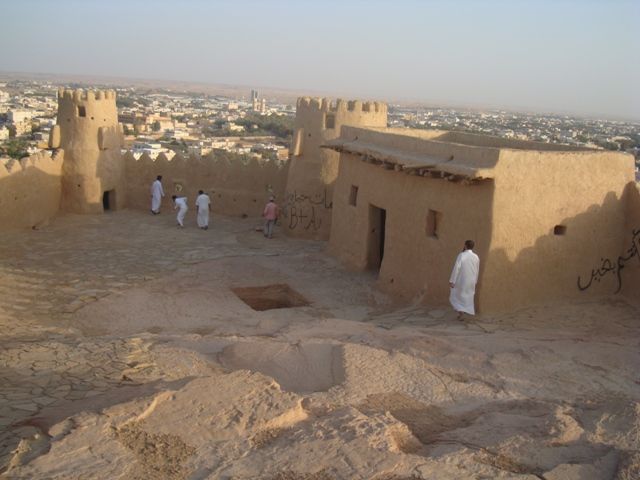
This photo shows the castle from the top.

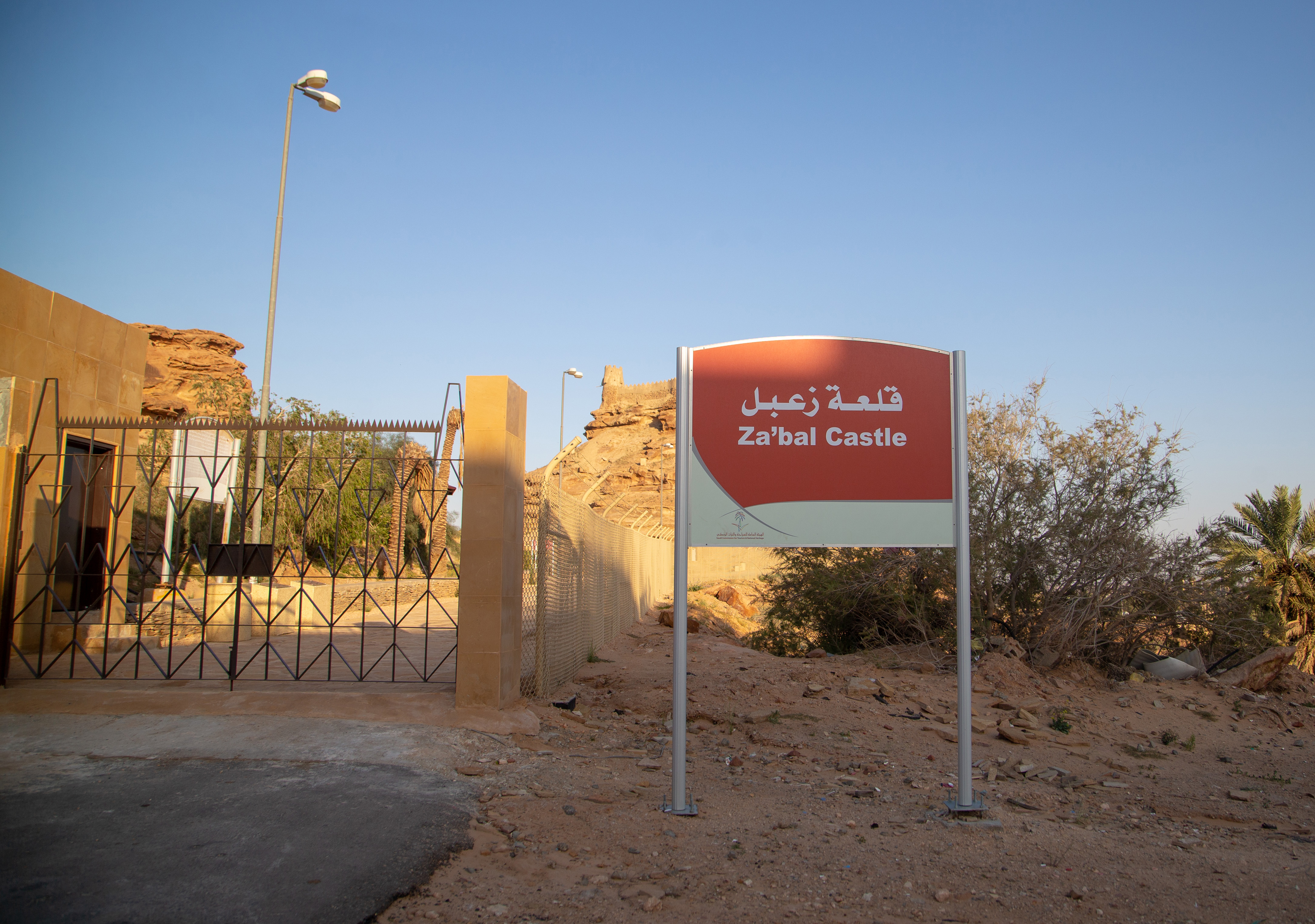
The entrenched of the castle site

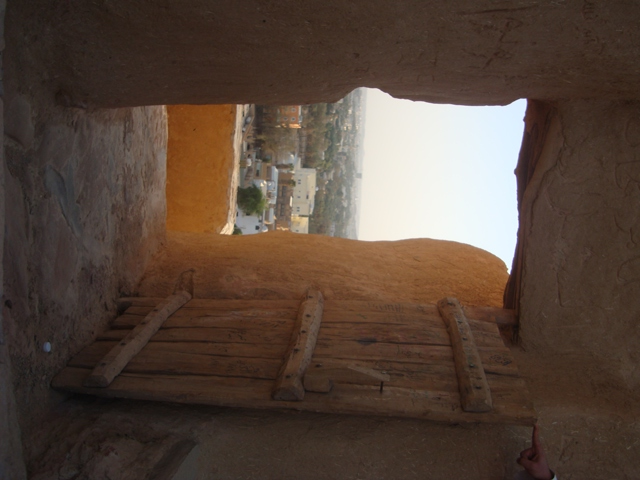
The main entrenched of the castle

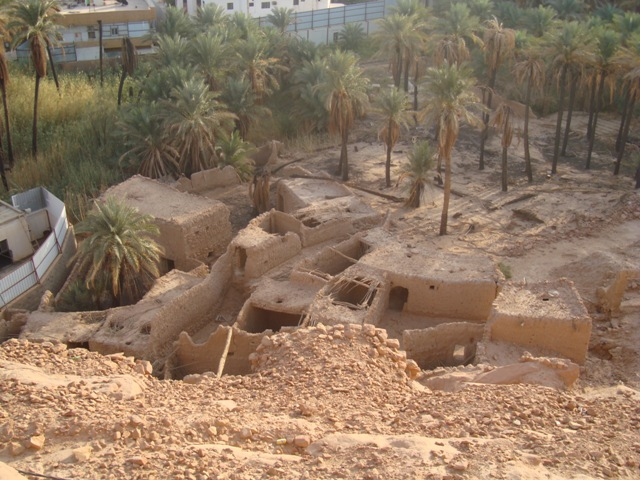
The view from the castle to an old neighborhood

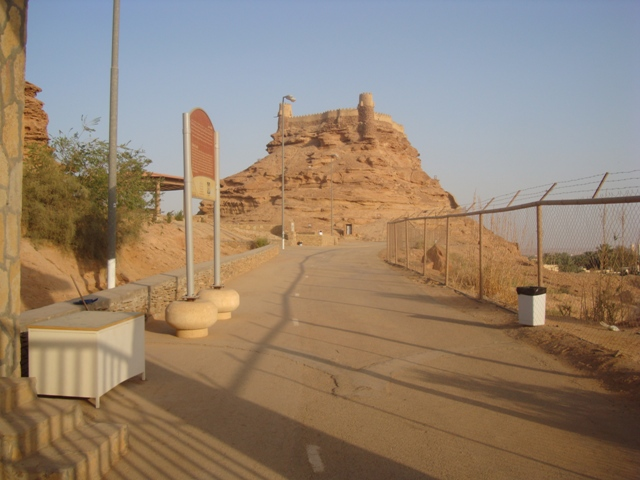
On the way to the castle
