= Modon Lake =

Lake in Saudi Arabia

- Location within Saudi Arabia
- Location: Dammam, Saudi Arabia
- Coordinates: 26°13′31″N 49°58′30″E
- Type: Artificial lake
- Basin countries: Saudi Arabia
- Surface area: 210,000 m^{2} (2,300,000 sq ft)

Modon Lake is the largest developed artificial lake in Saudi Arabia. Located in the Second Industrial City of Dammam, it was established by the Saudi Authority for Industrial Cities and Technology Zones, also known as Modon.

== Overview ==
Modon Lake is the largest artificial lake in Saudi Arabia, featuring environmentally treated renewable water. It was officially opened on 15 March 2014 in the presence of the governor of the Eastern Province, Saud bin Nayef, and the Minister of Commerce and Industry, Tawfig Al-Rabiah.

The project covers an area of approximately 400,000 square meters, with the lake itself occupying around 210,000 square meters. The development includes extensive green spaces, highlighted by the planting of 760 date palm trees arranged throughout the area.

Pedestrian walkways, designed to accommodate visitors, extend for about four kilometers around the lake. Modon Lake serves as a popular recreational destination and a green oasis for workers in the Second Industrial City of Dammam, as well as residents and visitors of the Eastern Province.

The Saudi Authority for Industrial Cities and Technology Zones (Modon) manages the supply of treated wastewater suitable for industrial use by recycling domestic and industrial sewage. Excess treated water is filtered and discharged into Modon Lake, supporting the lake’s ecosystem including its biological and plant components.

== See also ==
- Lake Dumat al-Jandal
- Al-Asfar Lake
