= Umar ibn al-Khattab Mosque =

Mosque in Al Jawf Province, Saudi Arabia

- Arabic: مسجد عمر بن الخطاب
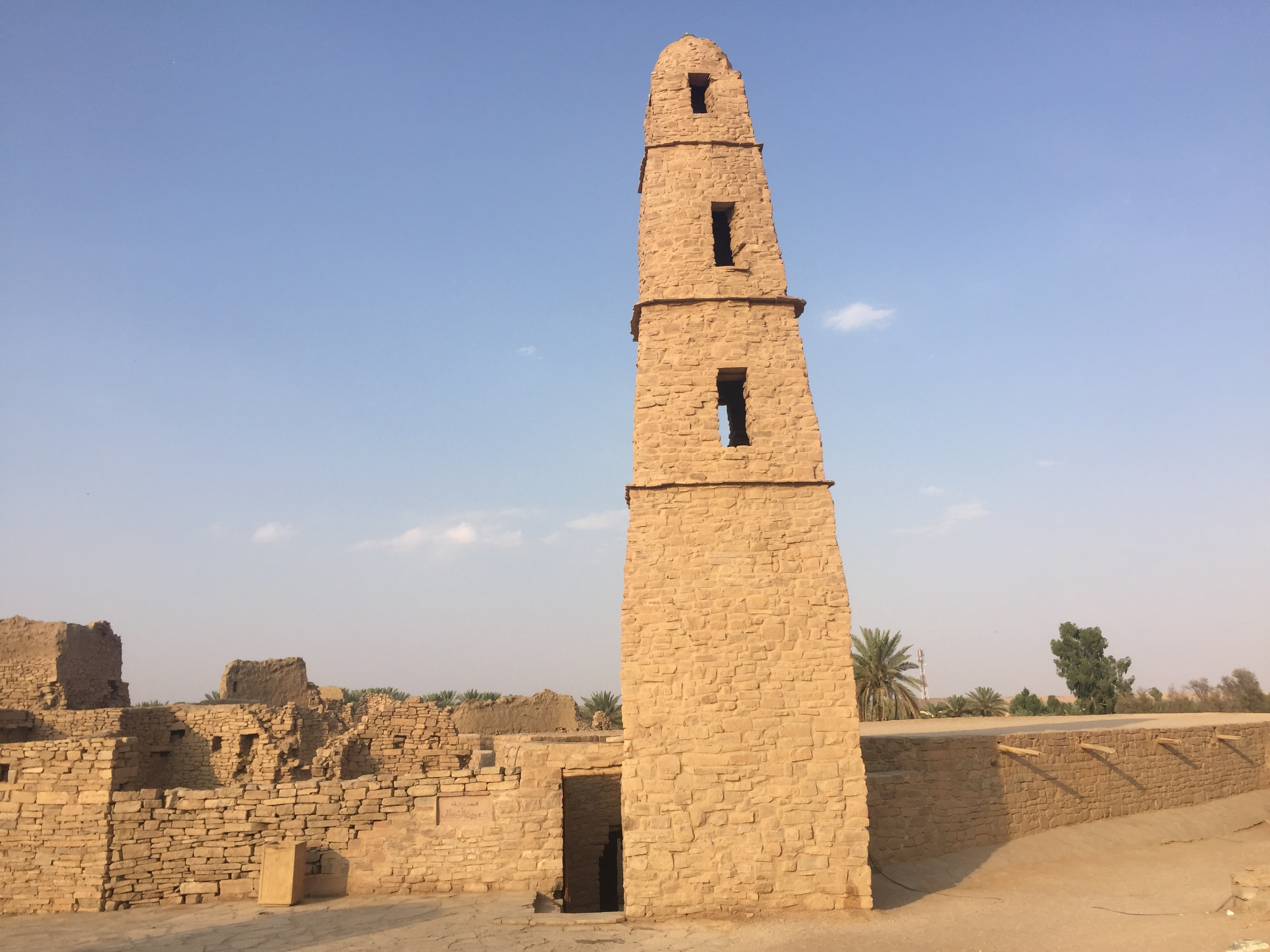
- The mosque, in 2017

- Location of the mosque in Saudi Arabia

Religion
- Affiliation: Sunni Islam
- Ecclesiastical or organizational status: Mosque
- Status: Active

Location
- Location: Dumat al-Jandal, Al Jawf Province
- Country: Saudi Arabia
- Interactive map of Umar ibn al-Khattab Mosque
- Coordinates: 29°48′43″N 39°52′03″E

Architecture
- Type: Mosque architecture
- Style: Islamic
- Completed: 7th–8th centuries CE

Specifications
- Minaret: One
- Materials: Brick

The Mosque of Umar ibn al-Khattab (Arabic: مسجد عمر بن الخطاب) is a Sunni Islam mosque, located within the historic city of Dumat al-Jandal in the Al Jawf Province of Saudi Arabia. The mosque is named after the Rashidun caliph Umar ibn al-Khattab, who is believed to have constructed the mosque, although this claim has been contested. The mosque's minaret is the first of its kind to be built in North Arabia as well.

The mosque is part of the historic core of Dumat al-Jandal, standing adjacent to Marid Castle and within the Al-Darʿi quarter of the old city. Its minaret, set at the south-west corner of the prayer hall and rising in tapering tiers, is considered the earliest surviving minaret of its type in northern Arabia.

== History ==
The mosque was built during the reign of the Umayyad Caliphate. Islamic tradition reports that Umar ibn al-Khattab built the mosque to pray at, while on his journey to Jerusalem, hence the mosque's name. However, the structure of the mosque does not resemble architecture contemporary to the time period of the Rashidun Caliphate, so the attribution of its construction to Umar is considered by some historians to be unreliable.

In 1793, the Saud family renovated the mosque, as well as rebuilt the prayer hall so that it faced the qibla in a more accurate direction. The mosque itself is still a popular tourist destination in the modern age.

== Architecture ==
The spiral, pyramidal-base minaret of the mosque is considered the oldest minaret in North Arabia. The mosque, including the prayer hall and minaret, are made out of brick.

== Gallery ==
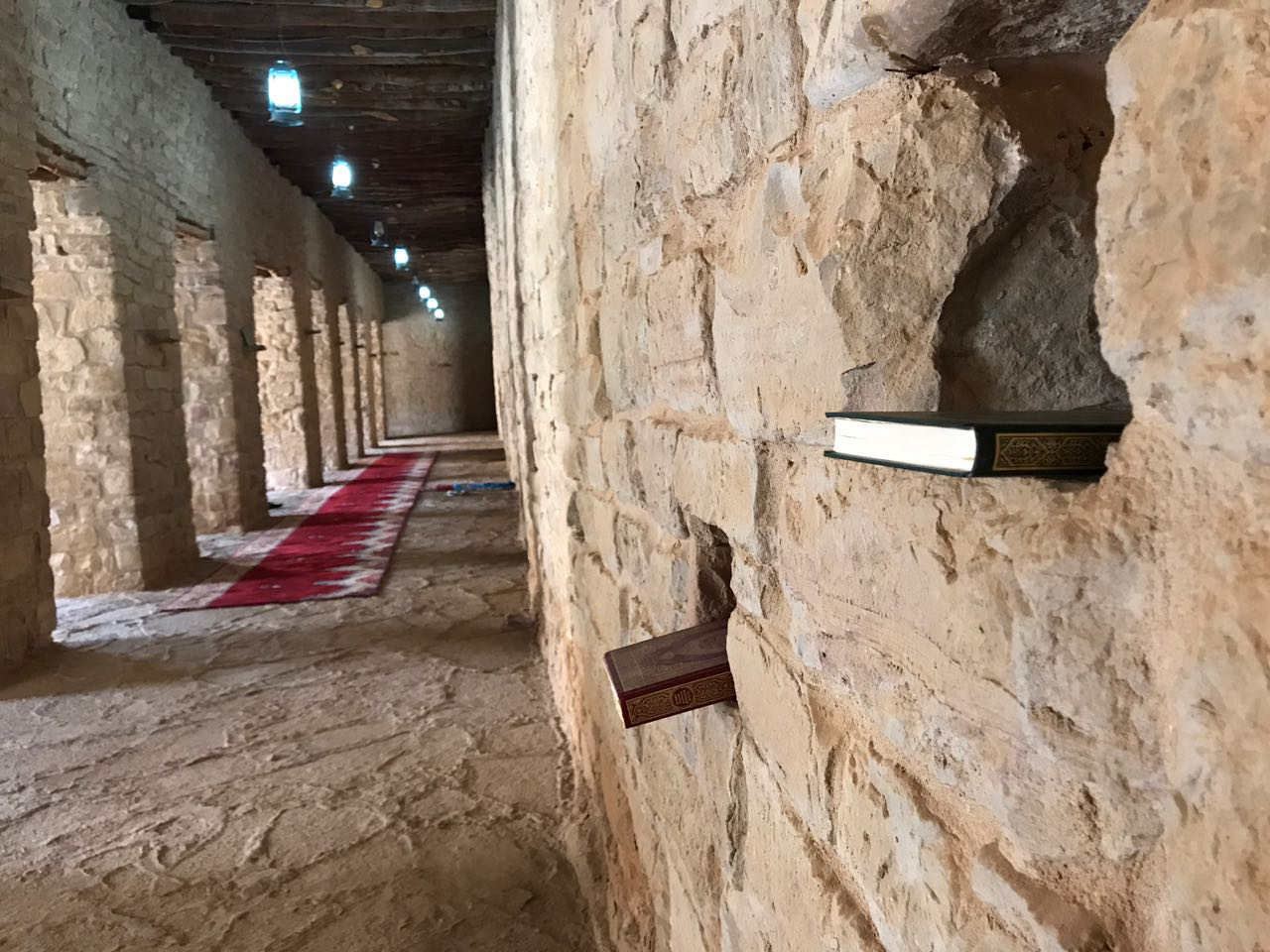
Inside the mosque's prayer hall

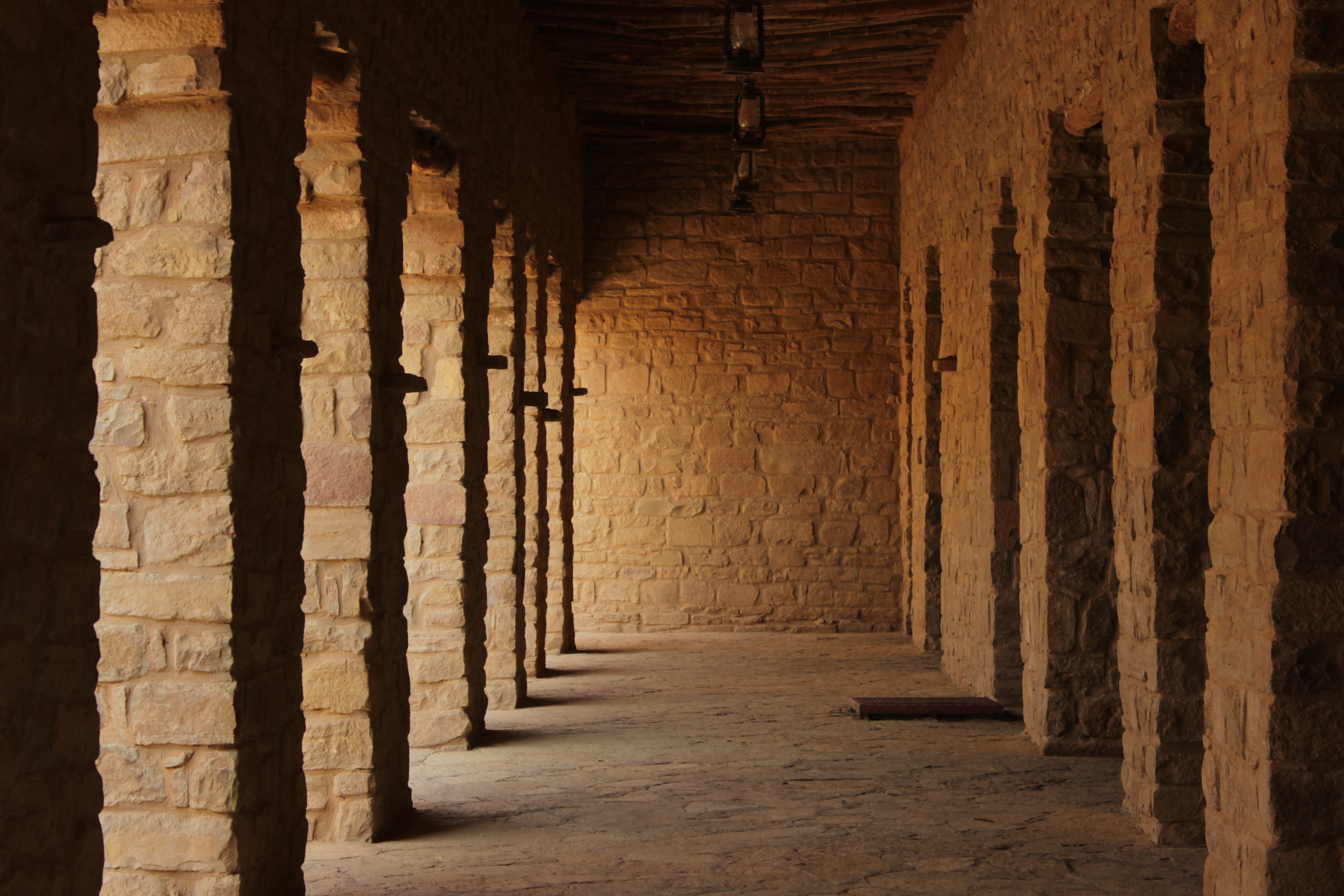
A columned arcade within the mosque

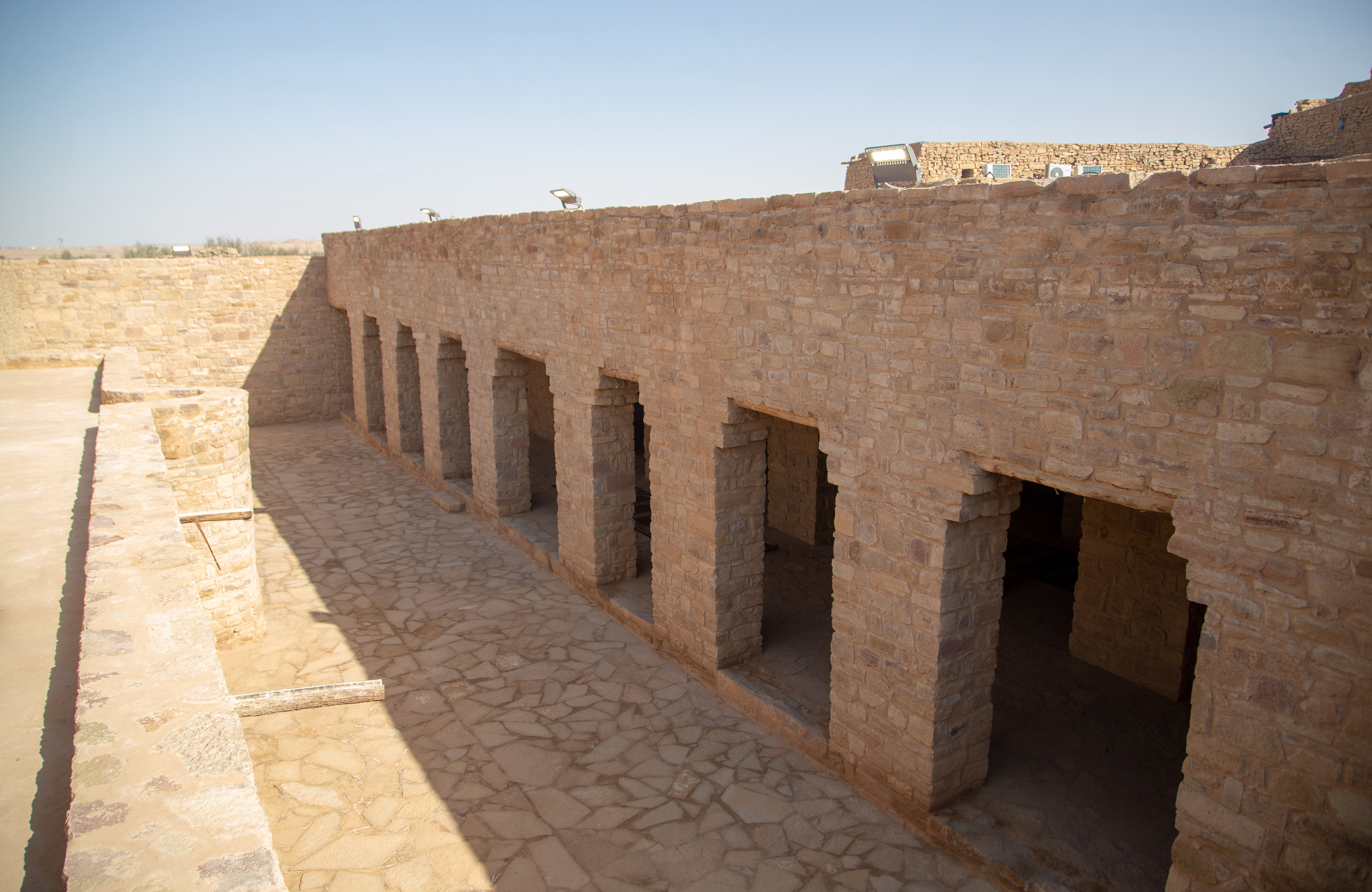
The courtyard of the mosque

== See also ==
- Islam in Saudi Arabia
- List of mosques in Saudi Arabia
- Lake Dumat al-Jandal
