= Al-Jouf Province =

Province of Saudi Arabia

Al-Jouf Province منطقة الجوف
- Province
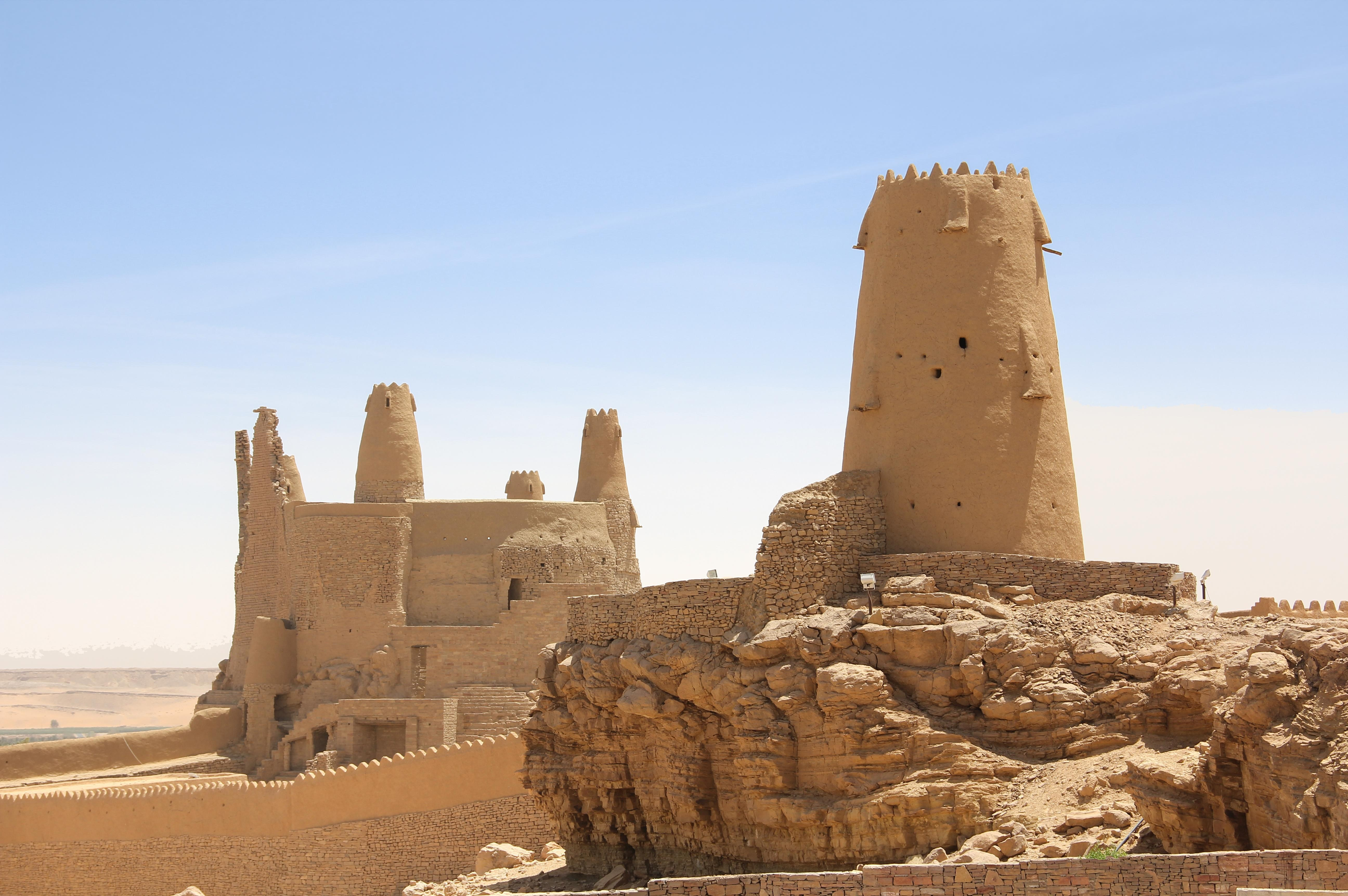
- Marid Castle

- Map of Saudi Arabia with Al-Jouf highlighted
- Coordinates: 30°0′N 40°12′E
- Country: Saudi Arabia
- Region: Badiyat al-Sham
- Seat: Sakaka
- Governorates: 4

Government
  - Type: Municipality
  - Body: Al-Jouf Municipality
  - Governor: Faisal bin Nawaf

Area
  - Total: 85,212 km^{2} (32,901 sq mi)

Population (2022)
  - Total: 595,822
  - Density: 6.9922/km^{2} (18.110/sq mi)
- Time zone: UTC+03:00 (SAST)
- ISO 3166-2: SA-12
- Area code: 014

Al-Jouf Province (Note: Al-Jouf (also transliterated as Al-Jawf or Al-Jowf) is the official English rendering used by the Saudi government. It is also known as the Al-Jouf Region.) (Arabic: منطقة الجوف) is a province in northern Saudi Arabia on the border with Jordan. Its seat is Sakaka, and it is known for its agriculture, especially olives, as well as historic sites such as Dumat al-Jandal.

== Economy ==
Al-Jouf Province’s economy is primarily based on agriculture and renewable energy. The province is one of Saudi Arabia’s largest agricultural producers and is particularly known for olive cultivation. The Al-Jouf Agricultural Development Company operates the world’s largest organic olive farm, which holds two Guinness World Records: one for the largest organic olive farm, covering an area of 6,453 hectares (64.53 km²), and another for the world’s largest modern olive farm. Olive cultivation in Al-Jawf Province began on a small scale in 1980 and was scaled up dramatically following the 2007 introduction of intensive olive-farming methods. By 2023, the province contained approximately 25 million olive trees and produced around 18,000 tons of olives annually.

The province is also home to the Dumat al-Jandal Wind Farm, the first and largest utility-scale wind power project in the Middle East. The wind farm has a capacity of 400 MW and can supply electricity to approximately 70,000 homes.

== Governorates ==
Map of Al-Jouf Province

The province consists of four governorates, with Sakaka serving as the seat of the province.

Governorate	Category	Population (2022)
Qurayyat	A	195,016
Dumat al-Jandal	A	54,341
Tabarjal	B	109,796
Suwayr	B	–

== Provincial government ==
The province is governed by a governor (Emir) appointed by the King of Saudi Arabia, assisted by a deputy governor.

Governor	Term of Office	Monarch(s)
Office established
Assaf Al-Hussein	1922 – 1924	Abdulaziz
Abdullah bin Muhammad	1924 – 1926	Abdulaziz
Turki bin Ahmed (1st Term)	1926 – 1927	Abdulaziz
Abdulrahman bin Saeed	1928 – 1929	Abdulaziz
Ibrahim bin Abdulrahman	1929 – 1930	Abdulaziz
Turki bin Ahmed (2nd Term)	1930 – 1932	Abdulaziz
Abdulaziz bin Ahmed	1933 – 1938	Abdulaziz
Mohammed bin Ahmed	1938 – 1943	Abdulaziz
Abdulrahman bin Ahmed	1943 – 1989	Abdulaziz, Saud, Faisal, Khalid, Fahd
Sultan bin Abdulrahman	1989 – 1998	Fahd
Abdul Elah bin Abdulaziz	1998 – 2002	Fahd
Fahd bin Badr	31 October 2002 – 26 February 2018	Fahd, Abdullah, Salman
Badr bin Sultan	27 February 2018 – 27 December 2018	Salman
Faisal bin Nawaf	27 December 2018 – present	Salman

== Transportation ==
=== Air ===
Al-Jouf is served by Al-Jouf International Airport.

=== Rail ===
The province has two stations on the Riyadh–Qurayyat railway: Qurayyat station and Al-Jouf station. Qurayyat station is the northern terminus of the railway.

== Historical sites ==
Al-Jouf Province has a long history, with archaeological and architectural remains found across the region, particularly in Dumat al-Jandal, one of its oldest settlements. These remains reflect successive historical periods, including the prehistoric era, as well as later civilizations such as the Canaanite, Nabataean, and Palmyrene periods. The region also contains evidence from the Rashidun, Umayyad, and Abbasid Islamic eras, in addition to remains from the Ottoman period.

Historical sites in the province include (but are not limited to):

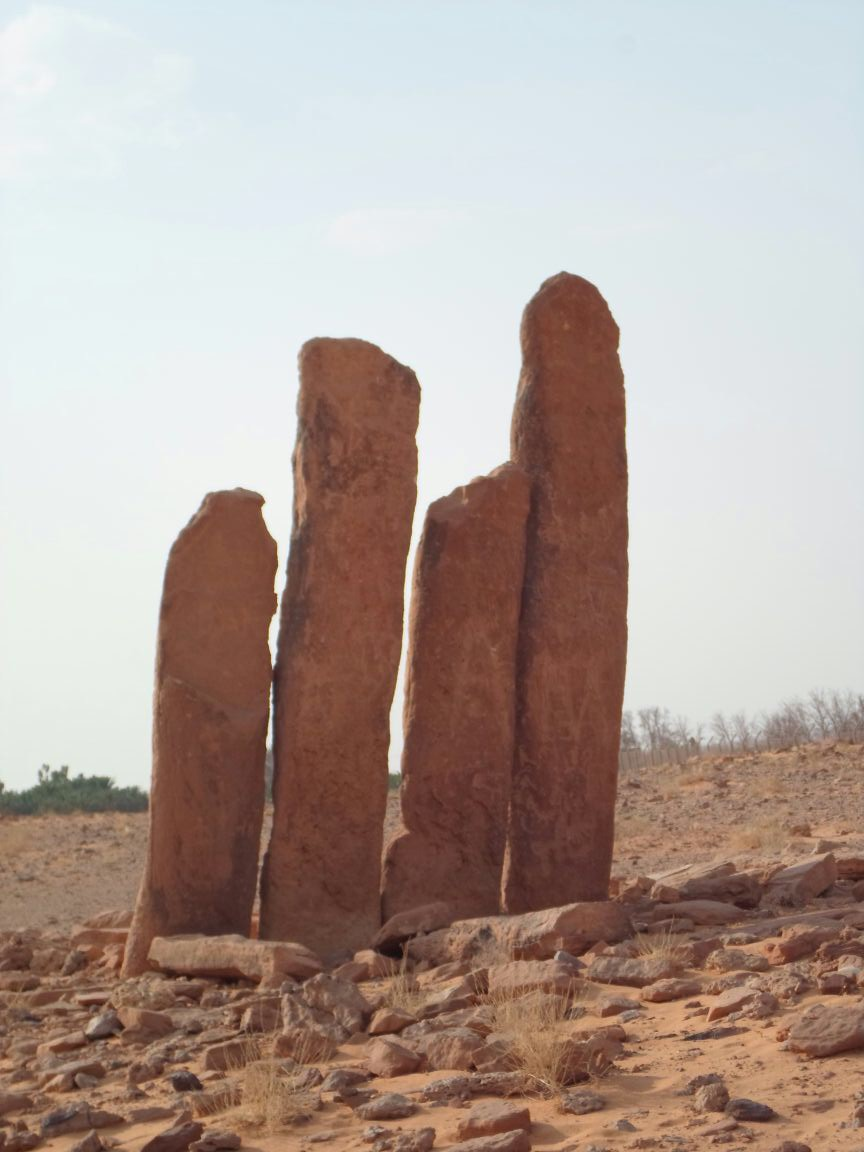
Columns of Rajajil – ancient standing stone pillars

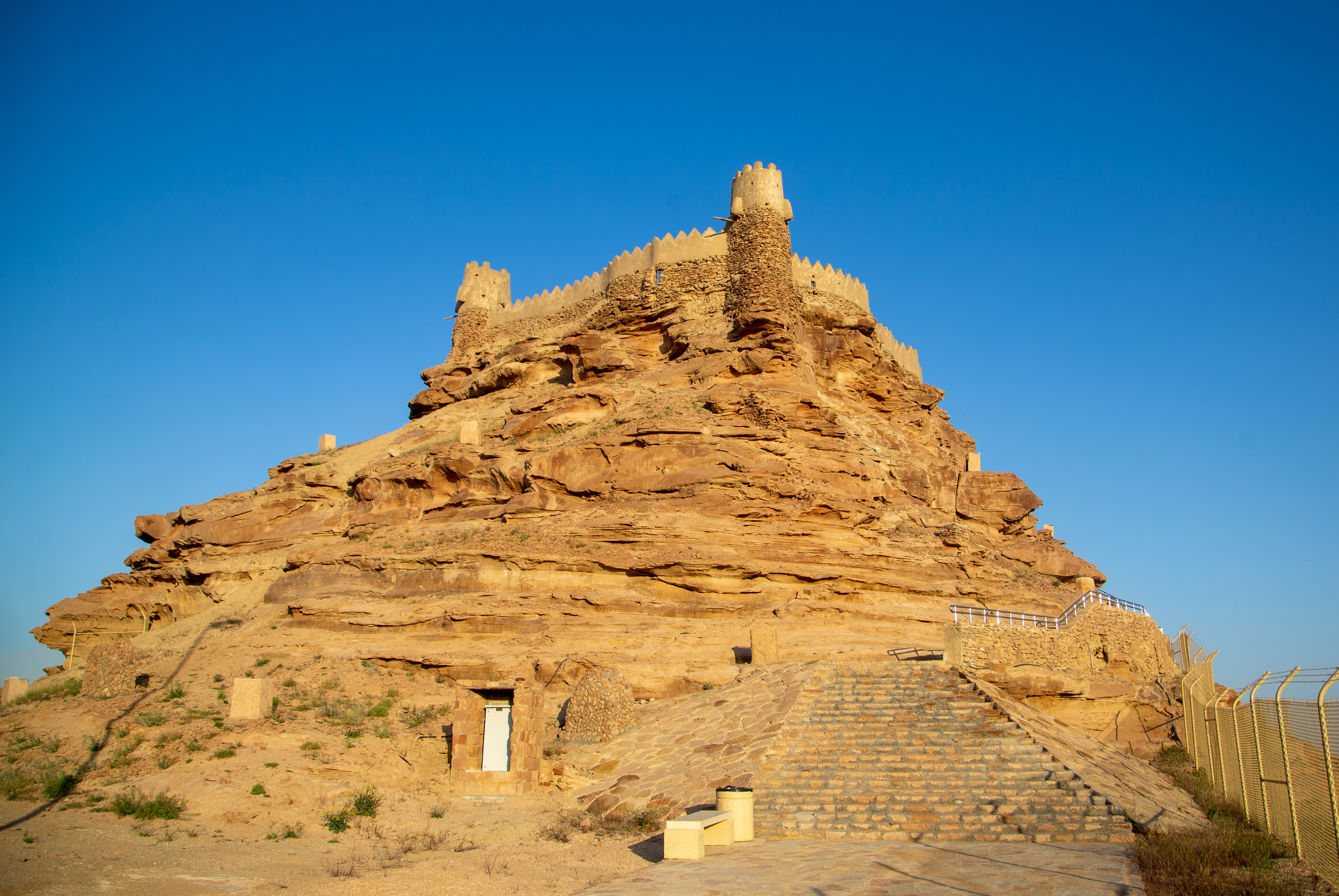
Zabal Castle – a hilltop fortress overlooking Sakaka

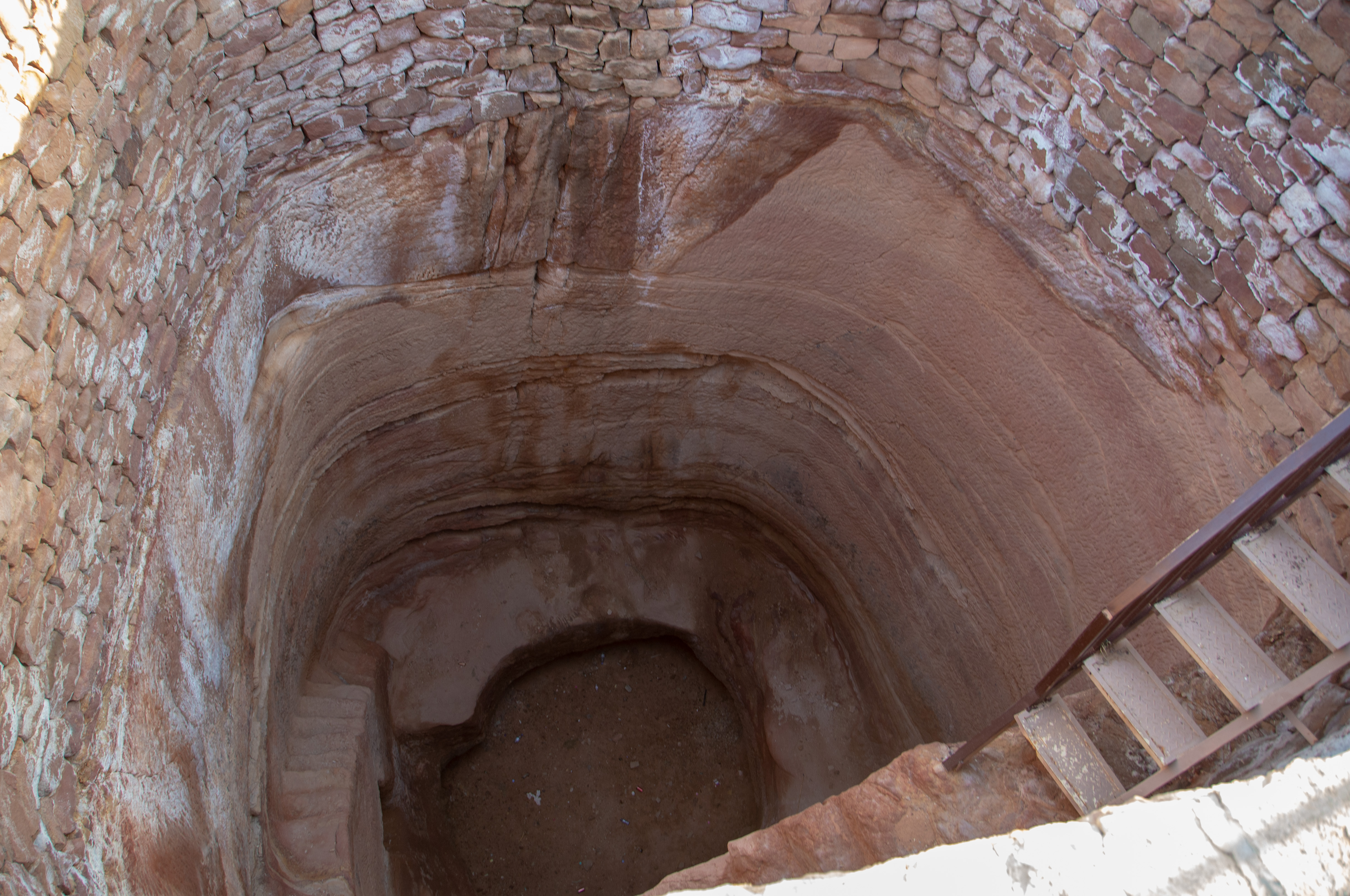
Sisira Well – an ancient rock-carved well

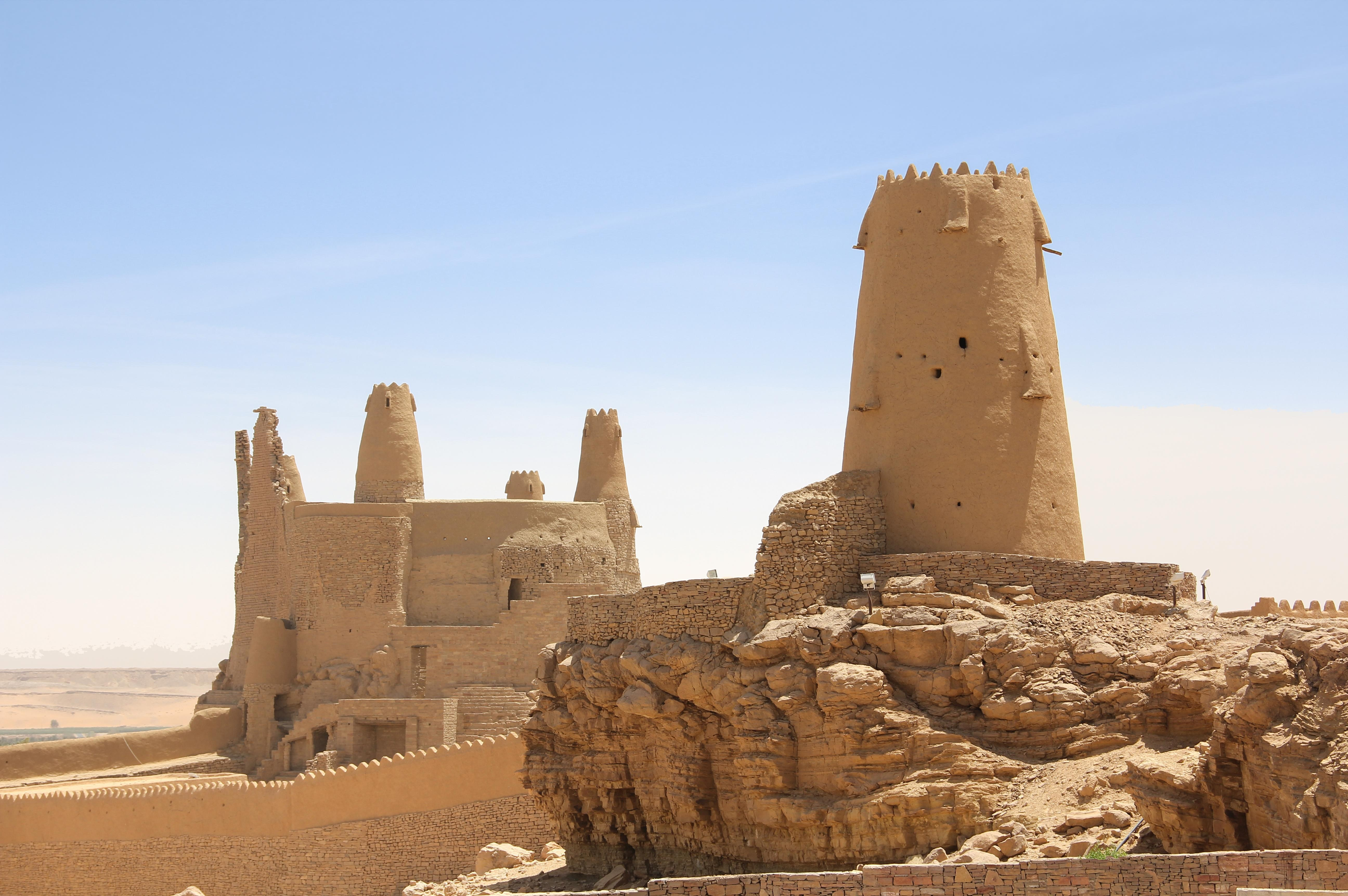
Marid Castle – historic fortress in Dumat al-Jandal

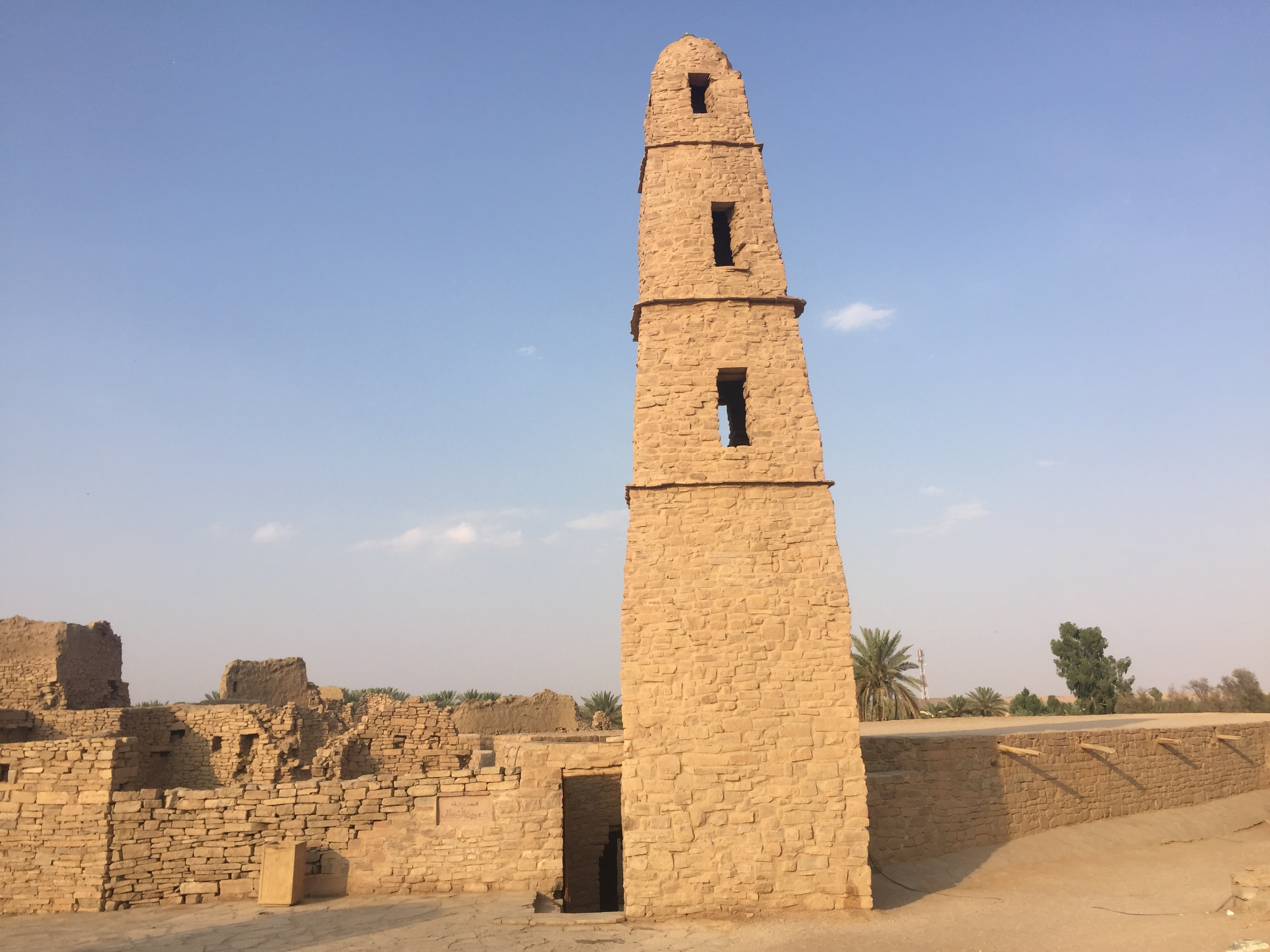
Umar ibn al-Khattab Mosque – early Islamic mosque in Dumat al-Jandal

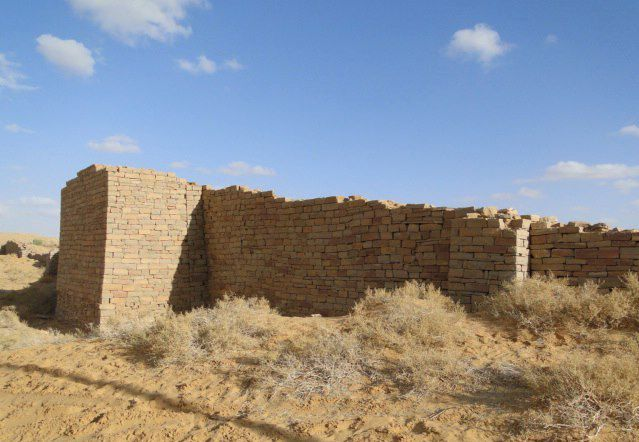
Dumat al-Jandal Wall – remains of the ancient defensive wall

== See also ==
- Provinces of Saudi Arabia
- List of governorates of Saudi Arabia
- List of cities and towns in Saudi Arabia
