= Columns of Rajajil =

Archaeological site in Saudi Arabia

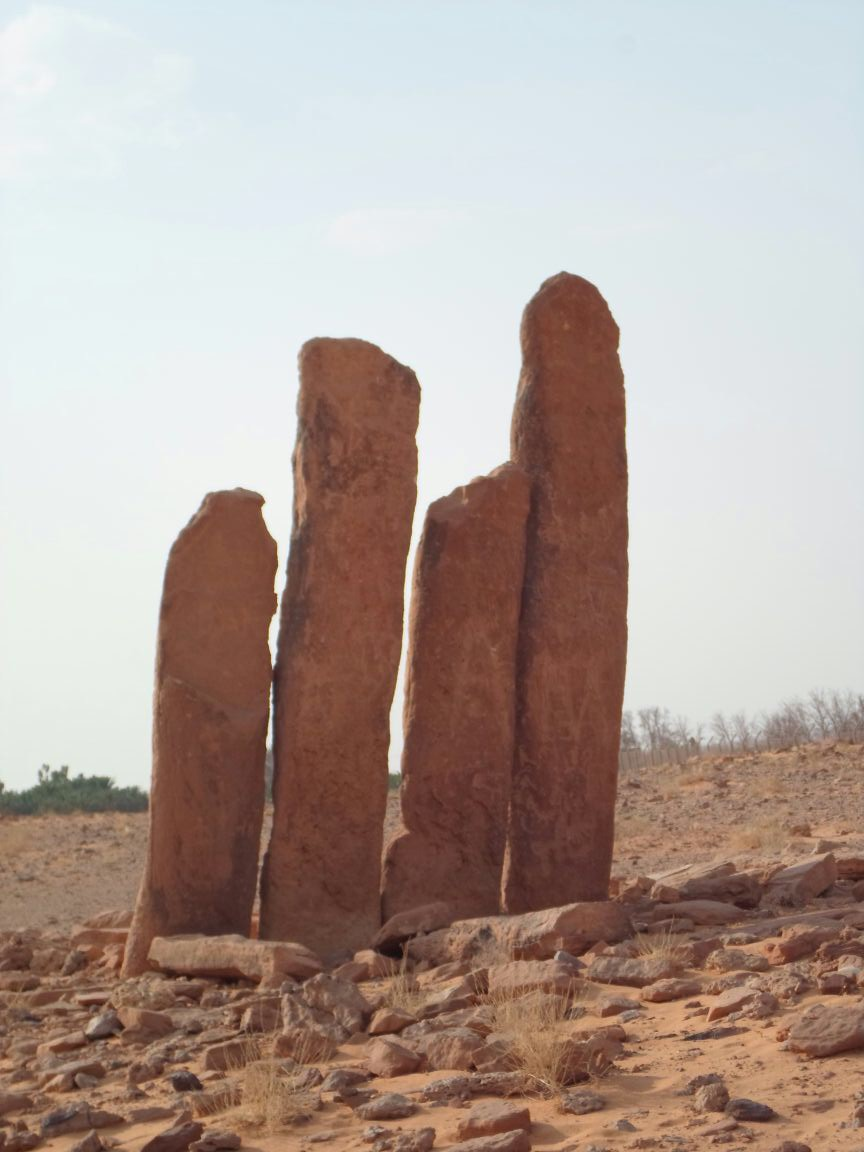
- A column group

- Location within Saudi Arabia
- 29°48′45″N 40°13′12″E
- Location: Sakaka, Saudi Arabia
- Region: Al-Jouf Province

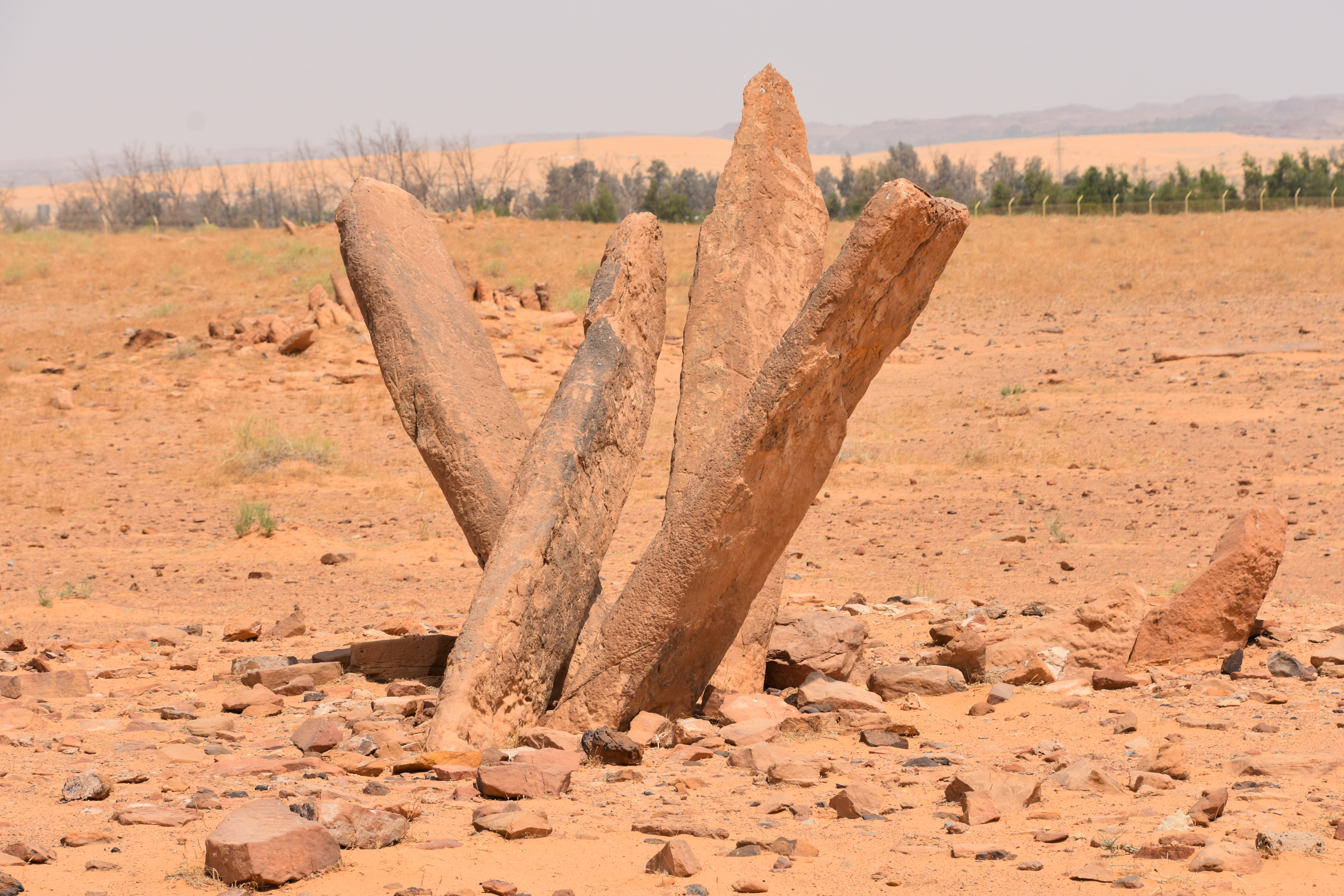

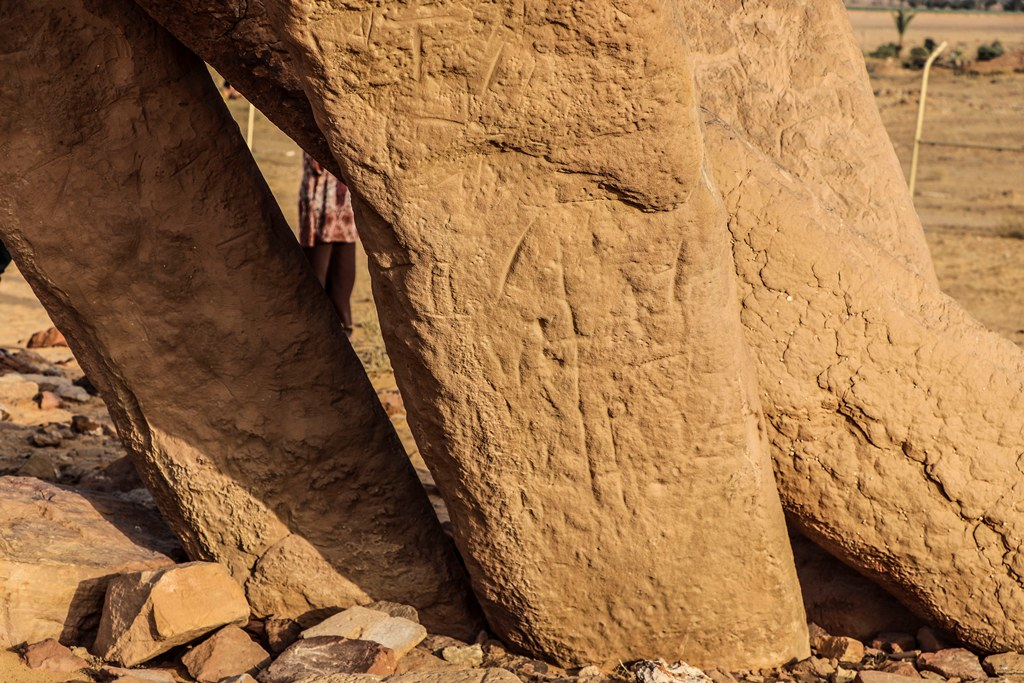
Column with thamudic inscriptions

The Columns of Rajajil (Arabic: أعمدة الرجاجيل) is an archaeological site of sandstone pillars in the Al Jawf Region of Saudi Arabia, dated to the Chalcolithic period approximately 6,000 years ago. Sometimes popularly described as "the Stonehenge of Saudi Arabia," the site comprises 54 groups of trimmed stone pillars, each group containing between two and 19 pillars, distributed across a wide sandy plain in the Qara suburb southeast of Sakakah. Some columns reach over three metres in height and bear Thamudic inscriptions.

== Etymology ==
The site is named Rajajil from a local Arabic term meaning "men," as the standing columns are said to resemble a gathering of human figures when viewed from a distance.

== Historical background ==
The columns may originally have formed part of a ritual complex of the fourth millennium BC. Each group of pillars consists of between two and 19 stones, with the tallest reaching approximately three metres in height. Aerial imagery suggests a rough alignment of the groups towards sunrise and sunset, which has led some researchers to propose an astronomical or calendrical function, while others have argued the site may have marked a long-distance trade route across the Wadi Sirhan caravan corridor connecting Yemen and Mesopotamia.

The columns are sometimes compared to Stonehenge in Britain, although the Rajajil site is considerably older, dating to the Chalcolithic period.

Current scholarly opinion suggests the site may have been a complex of small temples or sanctuaries visited by groups from outside the immediate region for religious or ceremonial purposes.

== Archaeological findings ==
Excavations carried out by the Saudi General Administration of Antiquities and Museums between 1975 and 1976 (1396–1397 AH) recovered stone tools — including scrapers, awls, and blades — as well as a quantity of pottery fragments, confirming a date in the Copper Age of the fourth millennium BC.

Further documented finds at the site, recorded by the Saudi Heritage Commission and Saudipedia, include obsidian stones, sandstone vessels, burnt ornaments, necklaces, and beads of metal, shell, and bone, alongside fan scrapers. Two excavated wells, dating to the fifth millennium BC, were used to draw water from depths of four to five metres.

Stone-circle and standing-stone traditions broadly comparable to Rajajil are documented across the wider region of the fourth millennium BC, extending into the Sinai, eastern Jordan, southern Syria, and western Iraq, and locally in the Al-Qassim region of Saudi Arabia.

== Bibliography ==
- Riyadh newspaper: Rajajil columns dating back to the fourth millennium BC.
- Ministry of Municipal and Rural Affairs. Al-Jawf Dora History, Archeology of Rajajil, page 8.
- Archaeological and historical evidence in the Kingdom of Saudi Arabia, Muhammad bin Saud Al-Sandah, Part 1, i 1, 1414 AH / 1994 AD, pp. 66–67.
- Al-Jouf Land of Archeology and Civilization, Turki bin Ibrahim Al-Qahidan, 1st floor, Al-Rushd Library, Riyadh, 1425 AH / 2004AD, pp. 100–101.
