= 2023 Saudi Super Cup final =

2023 Diriyah Saudi Super Cup Final
- Event: 2023 Saudi Super Cup
Al-Ittihad	Al-Hilal
1	4
- Date: 11 April 2024
- Venue: Mohammed bin Zayed Stadium, Abu Dhabi
- Man of the Match: Malcom (Al-Hilal)
- Referee: Khaled Al-Teris
- Attendance: 27,250
- Weather: Clear; 28.5 °C (83.3 °F); 53% humidity

The 2023 Saudi Super Cup final (also known as The Diriyah Saudi Super Cup final for sponsorship reasons) was the 10th edition of the Saudi Super Cup. The final was played on 11 April 2024 at the Mohammed bin Zayed Stadium, Abu Dhabi, between Al-Ittihad and Al-Hilal.

Al-Hilal defeated Al-Ittihad 4–1 to win their record-extending fourth title.

== Teams ==
Team	Qualification for tournament	Previous finals appearances (bold indicates winners)
Al-Hilal	2022–23 King Cup winners	5 (**2015**, 2016, **2018**, 2020, **2021**)
Al-Ittihad	2022–23 Pro League winners	3 (2013, 2018, **2022**)

== Venue ==
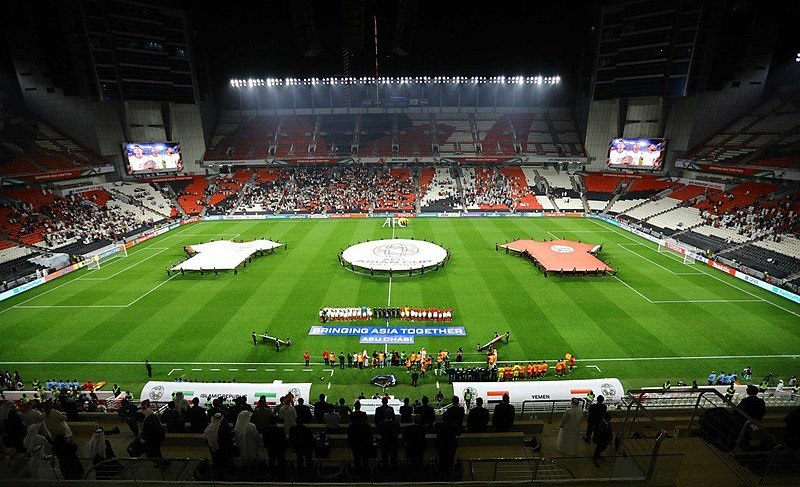
The Mohammed bin Zayed Stadium in Abu Dhabi hosted the match

The Mohammed bin Zayed Stadium was announced as the venue of the final on 9 March 2023. This was the first time the tournament was hosted in the United Arab Emirates.

The Mohammed bin Zayed Stadium was built and opened in 1980 and underwent renovations in 2006. The stadium was used as a venue for the 2007 Arabian Gulf Cup, the 2009 and the 2010 editions of the FIFA Club World Cup, and the 2019 AFC Asian Cup. It is used by Al-Jazira and the United Arab Emirates national team as a home stadium.

== Background ==
As part of the running sponsorship deal between the Saudi Arabian Football Federation (SAFF) and the Diriyah company, the match was officially referred to as "The Diriyah Saudi Super Cup".

This was Al-Ittihad's fourth appearance in the final. Al-Ittihad were the defending champions having beaten Al-Fayha in last year's final. Al-Ittihad lost the 2013 and 2018 finals to Al-Fateh and Al-Hilal respectively. Al-Ittihad qualified by defeating Al-Wehda 2–1 in the semi-finals.

Al-Hilal was making their sixth finals appearance, the most by any club. They won the title three times, in 2015, 2018, and 2021. Al-Hilal qualified after defeating derby rivals Al-Nassr 2–1 in the semi-finals.

This was the second meeting between these two sides in the Saudi Super Cup and the eleventh meeting in a cup final. Al-Hilal previously defeated Al-Ittihad 2–1 in the 2018 edition. In the ten previous cup final meetings, both teams won five times each with the first cup final dating back to the 1964 King Cup final. This was the 162nd competitive meeting between the two sides in all competitions. In their prior encounters, Al-Hilal won 73 times, Al-Ittihad won 42 times, and the two teams drew 46 times. The two teams had met five times previously in the 2023–24 season, with Al-Hilal winning all five meetings.

== Match ==
=== Details ===
11 April 2024
21:30 UAEST

Al-Ittihad	1–4	Al-Hilal
Hamdallah 21'	Report	Malcom 5', 89'; S. Al-Dawsari 44'; N. Al-Dawsari 90+6'

Mohammed bin Zayed Stadium, Abu Dhabi
Attendance: 27,250
Referee: Khaled Al-Teris

**Al-Ittihad**	**Al-Hilal**

GK	1	(Saudi Arabia) Abdullah Al-Mayouf
RB	37	(Saudi Arabia) Fawaz Al-Sqoor
CB	5	(Italy) Luiz Felipe		(substituted off) 90'
CB	26	(Egypt) Ahmed Hegazi (c)
LB	33	(Saudi Arabia) Madallah Al-Olayan		(substituted off) 58'
RM	90	(Brazil) Romarinho		(substituted off) 58'
CM	29	(Saudi Arabia) Farhah Al-Shammrani
CM	7	(France) N'Golo Kanté
LM	77	(Saudi Arabia) Saleh Al-Amri	(yellow card) 39'	(substituted off) 74'
CF	99	(Morocco) Abderrazak Hamdallah
CF	9	(France) Karim Benzema
Substitutes:
GK	35	(Saudi Arabia) Mohammed Al-Mahasneh
DF	4	(Saudi Arabia) Omar Hawsawi
DF	15	(Saudi Arabia) Hassan Kadesh		(substituted on) 58'
DF	19	(Saudi Arabia) Turki Al-Jaadi		(substituted on) 90'
DF	25	(Saudi Arabia) Suwailem Al-Menhali
MF	22	(Saudi Arabia) Hammam Al-Hammami
MF	80	(Saudi Arabia) Hamed Al-Ghamdi		(substituted on) 74'
FW	11	(Portugal) Jota		(substituted on) 58'
FW	52	(Saudi Arabia) Talal Haji
Manager:
(Argentina) Marcelo Gallardo

GK	37	(Morocco) Yassine Bounou
RB	66	(Saudi Arabia) Saud Abdulhamid
CB	3	(Senegal) Kalidou Koulibaly	(yellow card) 53'
CB	5	(Saudi Arabia) Ali Al-Bulaihi
LB	6	(Brazil) Renan Lodi	(yellow card) 20'	(substituted off) 59'
CM	8	(Portugal) Rúben Neves
CM	22	(Serbia) Sergej Milinković-Savić
RW	96	(Brazil) Michael		(substituted off) 90+1'
AM	77	(Brazil) Malcom	(yellow card) 90'	(substituted off) 90+5'
LW	29	(Saudi Arabia) Salem Al-Dawsari (c)		(substituted off) 90+5'
CF	11	(Saudi Arabia) Saleh Al-Shehri		(substituted off) 60'
Substitutes:
GK	21	(Saudi Arabia) Mohammed Al-Owais
DF	2	(Saudi Arabia) Mohammed Al-Breik
DF	12	(Saudi Arabia) Yasser Al-Shahrani		(substituted on) 59'
DF	16	(Saudi Arabia) Nasser Al-Dawsari		(substituted on) 90+5'
DF	87	(Saudi Arabia) Hassan Al-Tombakti		(substituted on) 90+1'
MF	7	(Saudi Arabia) Salman Al-Faraj
MF	28	(Saudi Arabia) Mohamed Kanno		(substituted on) 60'
MF	56	(Saudi Arabia) Mohammed Al-Qahtani
FW	14	(Saudi Arabia) Abdullah Al-Hamdan		(substituted on) 90+5'
Manager:
(Portugal) Jorge Jesus

Man of the Match:
Malcom (Al-Hilal)

Assistant referees:
Mohammed Al-Abkari
Abdulraheem Al-Shammari
Fourth official:
Majed Al-Shamrani
Video assistant referee:
Abdullah Al-Shehri
Assistant video assistant referees:
Ibrahim Al-Dakheel

**Match rules**

- 90 minutes
- Penalty shoot-out if scores still level
- Nine named substitutes
- Maximum of five substitutions

=== Statistics ===
First half
Statistic	Al-Ittihad	Al-Hilal
Goals scored	1	2
Total shots	5	8
Shots on target	4	3
Saves	1	3
Ball possession	43%	57%
Corner kicks	1	5
Offsides	2	0
Yellow cards	1	1
Red cards	0	0

Second half
Statistic	Al-Ittihad	Al-Hilal
Goals scored	0	2
Total shots	0	11
Shots on target	0	6
Saves	4	0
Ball possession	41%	59%
Corner kicks	0	3
Offsides	3	1
Yellow cards	0	2
Red cards	0	0

Overall
Statistic	Al-Ittihad	Al-Hilal
Goals scored	1	4
Total shots	5	19
Shots on target	4	9
Saves	5	3
Ball possession	42%	58%
Corner kicks	1	8
Fouls committed	7	11
Offsides	5	1
Yellow cards	1	3
Red cards	0	0

== See also ==
- 2022–23 Saudi Pro League
- 2022–23 King Cup
