= 2023–24 Al Hilal SFC season =

Al Hilal
2023–24 season
- President: Fahd Bin Saad Bin Nafel
- Head coach: Jorge Jesus
- Stadium: Prince Faisal bin Fahd Stadium
- Saudi Pro League: 1st
- King Cup: Winners
- Champions League: Semi-finals (knocked out by Al Ain)
- Arab Club Champions Cup: Runners-up (knocked out by Al-Nassr)
- Super Cup: Winners
- Top goalscorer: League: Aleksandar Mitrović (28); All: Aleksandar Mitrović (40)
- Highest home attendance: 59,600 (vs. Al-Fayha, 19 August 2023)
- Lowest home attendance: 7,141 (vs. Nassaji Mazandaran, 4 December 2023)
- Average home league attendance: 21,824
Home colours	Away colours	Third colours

The 2023–24 season was Al Hilal's 48th consecutive season in the top flight of Saudi football and 66th year in existence as a football club. The club participated in the Pro League, the King Cup, the AFC Champions League, the Arab Club Champions Cup, and the Saudi Super Cup. The season covers the period from 1 July 2023 to 30 June 2024.

On 26 February 2024, Al Hilal won a record fourteenth consecutive Saudi Pro League match with a 2–0 victory against Al-Ettifaq, surpassing rival Al-Nassr's previous league record of thirteen consecutive wins achieved from November 2013 to February 2014.

On 5 April, following a 4–1 victory over Al-Khaleej, Al Hilal set a new world record for consecutive matches won by a men's top-flight professional football club across all competitions with 32, breaking the record of 31 previously set by Irish club Belfast Celtic in 1948. Al Hilal's streak would end at 34 consecutive wins, after losing 4–2 away to Al Ain in the first leg of the Champions League semi-finals on 17 April. This record did not last long, as the Turkmen club Arkadag broke the record in the same year, reaching 61 consecutive wins, before the streak ended on November 1 after the team lost to Al-Arabi with a score of 3–2. Subsequently, Al Hilal completed the unbeaten season on 27 May.

== Players ==
=== Squad information ===
As of 1 February 2024

Note: Flags indicate national team as defined under FIFA eligibility rules; some limited exceptions apply. Players may hold more than one non-FIFA nationality.

No.	Pos.	Nation	Player
2	DF	KSA	Mohammed Al-Breik
3	DF	SEN	Kalidou Koulibaly
4	DF	KSA	Khalifah Al-Dawsari
5	DF	KSA	Ali Al-Bulaihi
6	DF	BRA	Renan Lodi
7	MF	KSA	Salman Al-Faraj (captain)
8	MF	POR	Ruben Neves
9	FW	SRB	Aleksandar Mitrović
10	FW	BRA	Neymar
11	FW	KSA	Saleh Al-Shehri
12	DF	KSA	Yasser Al-Shahrani
14	FW	KSA	Abdullah Al-Hamdan
16	MF	KSA	Nasser Al-Dawsari
17	GK	KSA	Mohammed Al-Rubaie
21	GK	KSA	Mohammed Al-Owais

No.	Pos.	Nation	Player
22	MF	SRB	Sergej Milinković-Savić
26	MF	KSA	Abdulellah Al-Malki
28	MF	KSA	Mohamed Kanno
29	MF	KSA	Salem Al-Dawsari
31	GK	KSA	Habib Al-Wotayan
32	DF	KSA	Muteb Al-Mufarrij
37	GK	MAR	Yassine Bounou
39	MF	KSA	Suhaib Al-Zaid
40	GK	KSA	Ahmed Abu Rasen
56	MF	KSA	Mohammed Al-Qahtani
66	DF	KSA	Saud Abdulhamid
70	DF	KSA	Mohammed Jahfali
77	FW	BRA	Malcom
87	DF	KSA	Hassan Al-Tambakti
96	MF	BRA	Michael

=== Out on loan ===
Note: Flags indicate national team as defined under FIFA eligibility rules; some limited exceptions apply. Players may hold more than one non-FIFA nationality.

No.	Pos.	Nation	Player
15	MF	BRA	Matheus Pereira (at Cruzeiro until 30 June 2024)
42	DF	KSA	Muath Faqeehi (at Al-Taawoun until 30 June 2024)
43	MF	KSA	Musab Al-Juwayr (at Al-Shabab until 30 June 2024)
49	FW	KSA	Abdullah Radif (at Al-Shabab until 30 June 2024)

No.	Pos.	Nation	Player
57	MF	KSA	Nasser Al-Hadhood (at Al-Raed until 30 June 2024)
60	GK	KSA	Ahmed Al Jubaya (at Al-Qadsiah until 30 June 2024)
88	DF	KSA	Hamad Al-Yami (at Al-Shabab until 30 June 2024)

== Transfers and loans ==
=== Transfers in ===
Entry date	Position	No.	Player	From club	Fee	Ref.
30 June 2023	DF	13	(Saudi Arabia) Abdulrahman Al-Obaid	(Saudi Arabia) Al-Ettifaq	End of loan	
30 June 2023	DF	–	(Saudi Arabia) Bandar Wohaishi	(Saudi Arabia) Al-Jabalain	End of loan	
30 June 2023	MF	15	(Brazil) Matheus Pereira	(United Arab Emirates) Al-Wahda	End of loan	
30 June 2023	MF	27	(Saudi Arabia) Fawaz Al-Torais	(Saudi Arabia) Al-Adalah	End of loan	
30 June 2023	MF	44	(Saudi Arabia) Saad Al-Nasser	(Saudi Arabia) Al-Taawoun	End of loan	
30 June 2023	MF	55	(Saudi Arabia) Hamad Al-Abdan	(Saudi Arabia) Al-Khaleej	End of loan	
30 June 2023	FW	34	(Saudi Arabia) Turki Al-Mutairi	(Saudi Arabia) Al-Taawoun	End of loan	
30 June 2023	FW	49	(Saudi Arabia) Abdullah Radif	(Saudi Arabia) Al-Taawoun	End of loan	
1 July 2023	DF	3	(Senegal) Kalidou Koulibaly	(England) Chelsea	$21,500,000	
1 July 2023	MF	8	(Portugal) Rúben Neves	(England) Wolverhampton Wanderers	$60,000,000	
12 July 2023	MF	22	(Serbia) Sergej Milinković-Savić	(Italy) Lazio	$44,500,000	
26 July 2023	FW	77	(Brazil) Malcom	(Russia) Zenit	$66,500,000	
15 August 2023	FW	10	(Brazil) Neymar	(France) Paris Saint-Germain	$98,100,000	
17 August 2023	GK	37	(Morocco) Yassine Bounou	(Spain) Sevilla	$22,800,000	
19 August 2023	FW	9	(Serbia) Aleksandar Mitrović	(England) Fulham	$57,300,000	
21 August 2023	DF	87	(Saudi Arabia) Hassan Al-Tambakti	(Saudi Arabia) Al-Shabab	$12,260,000	
17 January 2024	DF	6	(Brazil) Renan Lodi	(France) Marseille	$25,000,000	
28 January 2024	GK	17	(Saudi Arabia) Mohammed Al-Rubaie	(Saudi Arabia) Al-Ahli	Free	

=== Transfers out ===
Exit date	Position	No.	Player	To club	Fee	Ref.
1 July 2023	MF	8	(Saudi Arabia) Abdullah Otayf	(Saudi Arabia) Al-Ahli	Free	
1 July 2023	MF	55	(Saudi Arabia) Hamad Al-Abdan	(Saudi Arabia) Al-Khaleej	Free	
4 July 2023	MF	6	(Colombia) Gustavo Cuéllar	(Saudi Arabia) Al-Shabab	$1,500,000	
7 July 2023	DF	–	(Saudi Arabia) Bandar Wohaishi	(Saudi Arabia) Al-Raed	Free	
18 July 2023	MF	27	(Saudi Arabia) Fawaz Al-Torais	(Saudi Arabia) Al-Khaleej	Free	
18 July 2023	MF	–	(Saudi Arabia) Sattam Al-Rouqi	(Saudi Arabia) Al-Taawoun	Free	
29 July 2023	FW	34	(Saudi Arabia) Turki Al-Mutairi	(Saudi Arabia) Al-Hazem	Free	
9 August 2023	FW	10	(Argentina) Luciano Vietto	(Saudi Arabia) Al-Qadsiah	Free	
13 August 2023	MF	19	(Peru) André Carrillo	(Saudi Arabia) Al-Qadsiah	Free	
15 August 2023	FW	9	(Nigeria) Odion Ighalo	(Saudi Arabia) Al-Wehda	Free	
16 August 2023	MF	44	(Saudi Arabia) Saad Al-Nasser	(Saudi Arabia) Al-Taawoun	Undisclosed	
3 September 2023	GK	1	(Saudi Arabia) Abdullah Al-Mayouf	(Saudi Arabia) Al-Ittihad	Undisclosed	
5 September 2023	DF	67	(Saudi Arabia) Mohammed Al-Khaibari	(Saudi Arabia) Al-Khaleej	Free	
8 September 2023	DF	13	(Saudi Arabia) Abdulrahman Al-Obaid	(Saudi Arabia) Damac	Free	
8 September 2023	FW	17	(Mali) Moussa Marega	(United Arab Emirates) Sharjah	Free	
20 September 2023	DF	20	(South Korea) Jang Hyun-soo	(Qatar) Al-Gharafa	Released	

=== Loans out ===
Start date	End date	Position	No.	Player	To club	Fee	Ref.
7 July 2023	End of season	MF	57	(Saudi Arabia) Nasser Al-Hadhood	(Saudi Arabia) Al-Raed	None	
23 July 2023	End of season	DF	42	(Saudi Arabia) Muath Faqeehi	(Saudi Arabia) Al-Taawoun	None	
24 July 2023	End of season	GK	60	(Saudi Arabia) Ahmed Al Jubaya	(Saudi Arabia) Al-Qadsiah	None	
24 July 2023	End of season	MF	15	(Brazil) Matheus Pereira	(Brazil) Cruzeiro	None	
6 September 2023	End of season	DF	88	(Saudi Arabia) Hamad Al-Yami	(Saudi Arabia) Al-Shabab	None	
6 September 2023	End of season	FW	49	(Saudi Arabia) Abdullah Radif	(Saudi Arabia) Al-Shabab	None	
12 January 2024	End of season	MF	43	(Saudi Arabia) Musab Al-Juwayr	(Saudi Arabia) Al-Shabab	None	

== Pre-season and friendlies ==
8 July 2023 Friendly	Al-Hilal (Saudi Arabia)	6–0	(Austria) ATUS Velden	Velden am Wörther See, Austria
18:00 CEST	Al-Shehri 15'; Al-Hamdan 47', 52'; S. Al-Dawsari 78'; Al-Qahtani 83'; Radif 89'	Report		Stadium: Waldarena Velden

11 July 2023 Friendly	Al-Hilal (Saudi Arabia)	2–0	(Slovenia) Gorica	Villach, Austria
18:00 CEST	Al-Khaibari 43'; Radif 85'	Report		Stadium: Sportzentrum Landskron

14 July 2023 Friendly	Al-Hilal (Saudi Arabia)	2–1	(Austria) Wolfsberger AC	Wolfsberg, Austria
18:00 CEST	Neves 47'; S. Al-Dawsari 74'	Report	Sabitzer 87'	Stadium: Lavanttal-Arena

19 July 2023 Friendly	Al-Hilal (Saudi Arabia)	0–1	(Ukraine) Dynamo Kyiv	Sankt Veit an der Glan, Austria
18:00 CEST		Report	Buyalskyi 6'	Stadium: Jacques Lemans Arena

23 July 2023 Friendly	Al-Hilal (Saudi Arabia)	4–2	Kuwait SC	Riyadh, Saudi Arabia
21:30 AST	Milinković-Savić 2'; S. Al-Dawsari 9' (pen.); Michael 45'; Neves 52' (pen.)	Report	Khenissi 5'; Amri 45+2'	Stadium: King Fahd International Stadium

29 January 2024 2024 Riyadh Season Cup	Al-Hilal (Saudi Arabia)	4–3	(United States) Inter Miami	Riyadh, Saudi Arabia
21:00 AST	Mitrović 10'; Al-Hamdan 13'; Michael 44'; Malcom 88'	Report	Suárez 34'; Messi 54' (pen.); Ruiz 55'	Stadium: Kingdom Arena; Attendance: 26,000; Referee: Edina Alves Batista (Brazil)

8 February 2024 2024 Riyadh Season Cup	Al-Hilal (Saudi Arabia)	2–0	(Saudi Arabia) Al-Nassr	Riyadh, Saudi Arabia
20:10 SAST (UTC+3)	Milinković-Savić 17'; Malcom (yellow card) 28'; S. Al-Dawsari 30'; Lodi (yellow card) 63'; Mitrović (yellow card) 90+2'	Report	Talisca (yellow card) 8'; Brozović (yellow card) 22'; Ronaldo (yellow card) 53'; Otávio (yellow card) 85'; Yahya (yellow card) 90+6'	Stadium: Kingdom Arena; Attendance: 26,000; Referee: Tori Penso (United States)

== Competitions ==
=== Overview ===
Competition	Record							
Competition	Pld	W	D	L	GF	GA	GD	Win %
Pro League	34	31	3	0	101	23	+78	91.18
King Cup	5	4	1	0	10	2	+8	80.00
Champions League	12	10	1	1	30	9	+21	83.33
Arab Club Champions Cup	6	3	1	2	11	8	+3	50.00
Super Cup	2	2	0	0	6	2	+4	100.00
Total	59	50	6	3	158	44	+114	84.75

Source: Competitions

=== Pro League ===
==== League table ====
Pos	Team	Pld	W	D	L	GF	GA	GD	Pts	Qualification or relegation
1	Al-Hilal (C)	34	31	3	0	101	23	+78	96	Qualification for AFC Champions League Elite league stage
2	Al-Nassr	34	26	4	4	100	42	+58	82	Qualification for AFC Champions League Elite league stage
3	Al-Ahli	34	19	8	7	67	35	+32	65	Qualification for AFC Champions League Elite league stage
4	Al-Taawoun	34	16	11	7	51	35	+16	59	Qualification for AFC Champions League Two group stage
5	Al-Ittihad	34	16	6	12	63	54	+9	54	

Source: SPL
Rules for classification: 1) Points; 2) Head-to-head points; 3) Head-to-head goal difference; 4) Total goal difference; 5) Total goals scored; 6) Fair-play points
(Note: Head-to-head record is used only after all the matches between the teams in question have been played).
(C) Champions

==== Results summary ====
Overall								Home						Away					
Pld	W	D	L	GF	GA	GD	Pts	W	D	L	GF	GA	GD	W	D	L	GF	GA	GD
34	31	3	0	101	22	+79	96	16	1	0	50	9	+41	15	2	0	51	13	+38

Source: spl.com.sa

==== Results by round ====
Round	1	2	3	4	5	6	7	8	9	10	11	12	13	14	15	16	17	18	19	20	21	22	23	24	25	26	27	28	29	30	31	32	33	34
Ground	A	H	A	H	A	H	A	H	A	H	H	A	H	A	H	A	H	H	A	H	A	H	A	H	A	H	A	A	H	A	H	A	H	A
Result	W	D	W	W	W	W	D	W	W	W	W	W	W	W	W	W	W	W	W	W	W	W	W	W	W	W	W	W	W	W	W	D	W	W
Position	2	4	3	3	1	1	2	1	1	1	1	1	1	1	1	1	1	1	1	1	1	1	1	1	1	1	1	1	1	1	1	1	1	1

Source: spl.com.sa
A = Away; H = Home; W = Win; D = Draw; L = Loss

==== Matches ====
All times are local, AST (UTC+3).

Win Draw Loss Postponed

14 August 2023 1	Abha	1–3	Al-Hilal	Abha
18:00	Bguir 33'	Report	Malcom 31', 55', 77'; Al-Bulaihi (yellow card) 47'	Stadium: Prince Sultan bin Abdul Aziz Stadium; Attendance: 7,079; Referee: Radu Petrescu (Romania)

19 August 2023 2	Al-Hilal	1–1	Al-Fayha	Riyadh
21:00	Al-Hamdan 20'; Neves (yellow card) 55'; Radif (yellow card) 84'	Report	Sakala 15'; Stojković (yellow card) 65'; Cimirot (yellow card) 68'	Stadium: King Fahd International Stadium; Attendance: 59,600; Referee: Yael Falcón Pérez (Argentina)

24 August 2023 3	Al-Raed	0–4	Al-Hilal	Buraidah
21:00	Gonzalez (yellow card) 45+1' (yellow-red card) 78'; Al-Fahad (yellow card) 82'	Report	Mitrović 42'; S. Al-Dawsari 56' (pen.), 69'; Milinković-Savić (red card) 76'; Al-Hamdan 89'	Stadium: King Abdullah Sport City Stadium; Attendance: 20,630; Referee: César Arturo Ramos (Mexico)

28 August 2023 4	Al-Hilal	2–0	Al-Ettifaq	Riyadh
21:00	Malcom 24'; S. Al-Dawsari 41'; K. Al-Dawsari (yellow card) 90+5'	Report		Stadium: Prince Faisal bin Fahd Stadium; Attendance: 13,656; Referee: Ramon Abatti (Brazil)

1 September 2023 5	Al-Ittihad	3–4	Al-Hilal	Jeddah
21:00	Romarinho 16'; Benzema 38'; O. Hawsawi (yellow card) 41'; Hamdallah 45+8'; Bamsaud (yellow card) 63'; Al-Amri (yellow card) 90+12'	Report	Mitrović 20', 60', 65' (pen.); S. Al-Dawsari 71'; Al-Bulaihi (yellow card) 88'	Stadium: Prince Abdullah Al Faisal Stadium; Attendance: 23,742; Referee: Mario Escobar (Guatemala)

15 September 2023 6	Al-Hilal	6–1	Al-Riyadh	Riyadh
21:00	Mitrović 30' (pen.); Abdulhamid (yellow card) 33'; Al-Shahrani 45+4'; N. Al-Dawsari 68'; Malcom 83'; S. Al-Dawsari 87' (pen.), 90+5'	Report	Touré (yellow card) 21'; Ndong (yellow card) 34'; Musona (yellow card) 40'; Juanmi (yellow card) 45+8'; Al-Zaqaan 90+6'	Stadium: Prince Faisal bin Fahd Stadium; Attendance: 15,373; Referee: Tamás Bognár (Hungary)

21 September 2023 7	Damac	1–1	Al-Hilal	Abha
18:00	Hamed (yellow card) 12'; Al-Anazi (yellow card) 45+3'; Stanciu 68'	Report	Malcom 9'; Michael (yellow card) 90+2'	Stadium: Prince Sultan bin Abdul Aziz Stadium; Attendance: 11,072; Referee: István Kovács (Romania)

29 September 2023 8	Al-Hilal	2–0	Al-Shabab	Riyadh
21:00	Al-Bulaihi (yellow card) 45+7'; Koulibaly 68'; Mitrović 76'	Report	Al-Muwallad (yellow card) 87'	Stadium: Prince Faisal bin Fahd Stadium; Attendance: 14,769; Referee: Iván Barton (El Salvador)

7 October 2023 9	Al-Okhdood	0–3	Al-Hilal	Najran
18:00	Al Saleem (yellow card) 27'; Al-Rubaie (yellow card) 45+1' (yellow-red card) 45+4'; Burcă (yellow card) 81'	Report	Michael 10'; Neves (yellow card) 41'; Milinković-Savić 71', 83'	Stadium: Prince Hathloul bin Abdul Aziz Sports City; Attendance: 7,585; Referee: Halil Umut Meler (Turkey)

20 October 2023 10	Al-Hilal	1–0	Al-Khaleej	Riyadh
21:00	Mitrović 30'; Abdulhamid (yellow card) 35'; Neves (yellow card) 47'	Report	Jung Woo-young (yellow card) 23'; Martins (yellow card) 70'	Stadium: Prince Faisal bin Fahd Stadium; Attendance: 8,505; Referee: Darío Herrera (Argentina)

27 October 2023 11	Al-Hilal	3–1	Al-Ahli	Riyadh
21:00	Milinković-Savić 1'; Mitrović 37'; Ibañez 84' (o.g.)	Report	Ibañez (yellow card) 32'; Hindi (yellow card) 45+4'; Saint-Maximin 58'; Al-Asmari (yellow card) 88'; Kessié (yellow card) 90+1'	Stadium: King Fahd International Stadium; Attendance: 50,986; Referee: Yael Falcón Pérez (Argentina)

3 November 2023 12	Al-Fateh	0–2	Al-Hilal	Al-Hasa
18:00	Al-Masoud (yellow card) 90+1'	Report	Mitrović 5' (pen.); Koulibaly (yellow card) 26'; Al-Bulaihi (yellow card) 34'; Bounou (yellow card) 45+3'; Neves (yellow card) 66'; S. Al-Dawsari 90+3'	Stadium: Prince Abdullah bin Jalawi Stadium; Attendance: 18,097; Referee: Saíd Martínez (Honduras)

10 November 2023 13	Al-Hilal	2–0	Al-Taawoun	Riyadh
18:00	Al-Tambakti (yellow card) 11'; Mitrović 81', (yellow card) 90+3'; Kanno 90+9'	Report	Al-Oyayari (yellow card) 13'; Faqeehi (yellow card) 76'; Al-Abdulrazzaq (yellow card) 80'; Al-Nasser (yellow card) 90+8'	Stadium: King Fahd International Stadium; Attendance: 28,144; Referee: Iván Barton (El Salvador)

25 November 2023 14	Al-Hazem	0–9	Al-Hilal	Buraidah
18:00	Tozé (yellow card) 21'	Report	Mitrović 14'; Kanno 32'; Al-Qahtani 43'; Malcom 52', 55', 85', (yellow card) 90+5'; Al-Shehri 79', (yellow card) 83'; Al-Breik 81'; Milinković-Savić 90+3'	Stadium: King Abdullah Sport City Stadium; Attendance: 5,994; Referee: Fabio Maresca (Italy)

1 December 2023 15	Al-Hilal	3–0	Al-Nassr	Riyadh
21:00	Milinković-Savić 64'; Mitrović (yellow card) 69', (goal) 89', 90+2'; Koulibaly (yellow card) 79'; Al-Bulaihi (red card) 90+3'; Malcom (yellow card) 90+5'; Jahfali (yellow card) 90+10'	Report	Otávio (yellow card) 40'; Yahya (yellow card) 90+2'	Stadium: King Fahd International Stadium; Attendance: 50,561; Referee: Wilmar Roldán (Colombia)

8 December 2023 16	Al-Tai	1–2	Al-Hilal	Ha'il
18:00	Roco (yellow card) 34'; Abdullah 45+5', (yellow card) 90+6'; Cordea (yellow card) 79'	Report	S. Al-Dawsari 20'; Mitrović 30' (pen.); Milinković-Savić (yellow card) 88'; N. Al-Dawsari (yellow card) 90+7'	Stadium: Prince Abdulaziz bin Musa'ed Sports City; Attendance: 10,653; Referee: Alexis Herrera (Venezuela)

15 December 2023 17	Al-Hilal	2–0	Al-Wehda	Riyadh
18:00	Abdulhamid 20'; Mitrović 80'	Report		Stadium: Prince Faisal bin Fahd Stadium; Attendance: 13,349; Referee: Ismail Elfath (United States)

21 December 2023 18	Al-Hilal	7–0	Abha	Riyadh
21:00	Milinković-Savić 18', 79', 90+5'; Mitrović 25' (pen.), (yellow card) 55'; S. Al-Dawsari 72'; Kanno 82'; Neves 86'	Report	Sami (yellow card) 51'; Natiq (yellow card) 55'; Krychowiak (yellow card) 67'	Stadium: Prince Faisal bin Fahd Stadium; Attendance: 13,476; Referee: Bastian Dankert (Germany)

29 December 2023 19	Al-Fayha	0–2	Al-Hilal	Riyadh
18:00	Al-Harthi (yellow card) 62'; Zidan (yellow card) 87'; Al-Safri (yellow card) 90+11'; Al-Khaibari (yellow card) 90+11'; Al-Shuwaish (yellow card) 90+11'	Report	Al-Bulaihi 86', (yellow card) 87'; Mitrović 90+11' (pen.)	Stadium: Prince Faisal bin Fahd Stadium; Attendance: 7,789; Referee: Mario Escobar (Guatemala)

18 February 2024 20	Al-Hilal	3–1	Al-Raed	Riyadh
17:00	Mitrović 3', 29' (pen.); Michael (yellow card) 40'; Al-Bulaihi (yellow card) 42'; Koulibaly 52'; Lodi (yellow card) 61'; Al-Faraj (yellow card) 90+2'	Report	Sayoud 90+6'	Stadium: Kingdom Arena; Attendance: 15,051; Referee: Andris Treimanis (Latvia)

26 February 2024 21	Al-Ettifaq	0–2	Al-Hilal	Dammam
17:00	Toko Ekambi (yellow card) 42'; Al-Shamrani (yellow card) 64'	Report	Milinković-Savić 39'; Mitrović (yellow card) 45+3'; S. Al-Dawsari 45+5'; Neves (yellow card) 52'; Koulibaly (yellow card) 56'	Stadium: Al-Ettifaq Club Stadium; Attendance: 12,247; Referee: Fabio Maresca (Italy)

1 March 2024 22	Al-Hilal	3–1	Al-Ittihad	Riyadh
20:00	Al-Shehri 39', (yellow card) 50'; Malcom 59'; Abdulhamid 67'; Neves (yellow card) 77'	Report	Kanté 12'; Fabinho (yellow card) 35'; Al-Sahafi (yellow card) 47'; Hegazi (yellow card) 50'	Stadium: Kingdom Arena; Attendance: 17,210; Referee: Iván Barton (El Salvador)

8 March 2024 23	Al-Riyadh	1–3	Al-Hilal	Riyadh
17:00	Al-Bulaihi 52' (o.g.); Ndong (yellow card) 56'; Al-Shuwayrikh (yellow card) 63'; Campaña (yellow card) 66'; Musona (yellow card) 68'; Al-Shuwayyi (yellow card) 90'	Report	Abdulhamid (yellow card) 51'; Neves 66' (pen.); Michael 75'; Mitrović 90+3' (pen.)	Stadium: Prince Faisal bin Fahd Stadium; Attendance: 6,755; Referee: Wilton Sampaio (Brazil)

16 March 2024 24	Al-Hilal	2–1	Damac	Riyadh
22:00	Al-Bulaihi (yellow card) 11'; Abdulhamid (yellow card) 39'; S. Al-Dawsari 79'; Michael 90+3'	Report	Hamed (yellow card) 17'; Bedrane (yellow card) 70'; Antolić 86'; Al-Anazi (red card) 88'	Stadium: Kingdom Arena; Attendance: 16,451; Referee: Adonai Escobedo (Mexico)

30 March 2024 25	Al-Shabab	3–4	Al-Hilal	Riyadh
22:00	Al-Juwayr 3'; Santos (yellow card) 36'; Al-Sibyani 64'; Saïss 78'	Report	Mitrović 20' (pen.), 27'; Milinković-Savić 42'; S. Al-Dawsari 57'	Stadium: Al-Shabab Club Stadium; Attendance: 12,087; Referee: Mario Escobar (Guatemala)

2 April 2024 26	Al Hilal	3–0	Al-Okhdood	Riyadh
22:00	Al-Shehri 16'; Malcom (yellow card) 65', (goal) 66'; S. Al-Dawsari 73'	Report	Al Jahif (yellow card) 56'	Stadium: Kingdom Arena; Attendance: 16,358; Referee: Bastian Dankert (Germany)

5 April 2024 27	Al-Khaleej	1–4	Al-Hilal	Dammam
22:00	Sherif 9'; Al Hamsal (yellow card) 45+1'; Al-Khabrani (yellow card) 90+1'	Report	Al-Shehri 7', (yellow card) 45+4'; Malcom 42', 48'; Al-Hamdan (yellow card) 81', (goal) 90+6' (pen.)	Stadium: Prince Mohamed bin Fahd Stadium; Attendance: 17,214; Referee: Harm Osmers (Germany)

26 April 2024 29	Al-Hilal	3–1	Al-Fateh	Riyadh
18:00	Michael (yellow card) 33', (goal) 58'; N. Al-Dawsari (yellow card) 36'; Neves 74' (pen.); Al-Bulaihi 90+15'	Report	Baattiah (yellow card) 38'; Zelarayán 57', (yellow card) 73'; Tello (yellow card) 72'	Stadium: Kingdom Arena; Attendance: 16,978; Referee: Anastasios Sidiropoulos (Greece)

3 May 2024 30	Al-Taawoun	0–3	Al-Hilal	Buraidah
18:00	Faqeehi (yellow card) 30'; Al-Ghamdi (yellow card) 38'	Report	Mitrović (yellow card) 20', (goal) 40'; Milinković-Savić (yellow card) 61'; Abdulhamid 70'; Kanno (yellow card) 90+5'; Al-Shehri 90+7'	Stadium: King Abdullah Sport City Stadium; Attendance: 20,050; Referee: Sascha Stegemann (Germany)

6 May 2024 28	Al-Ahli	1–2	Al-Hilal	Jeddah
21:00	Al-Buraikan 30'; Kessié (yellow card) 70'; Demiral (yellow card) 70'; Balobaid (yellow card) 83'	Report	Al-Tambakti (yellow card) 50'; Mitrović 52'; Malcom 89'	Stadium: King Abdullah Sports City; Attendance: 49,816; Referee: Ricardo de Burgos Bengoetxea (Spain)

11 May 2024 31	Al-Hilal	4–1	Al-Hazem	Riyadh
18:00	Mitrović 15' (pen.), 45+3'; Neves (yellow card) 38'; Al-Juwaid 39' (o.g.); Milinković-Savić 45+6'; Koulibaly (yellow card) 47'; Al-Tambakti (yellow card) 90'	Report	Selemani 34'; Ricardo (yellow card) 90+4'	Stadium: Prince Faisal bin Fahd Stadium; Attendance: 11,230; Referee: Urs Schnyder (Switzerland)

17 May 2024 32	Al-Nassr	1–1	Al-Hilal	Riyadh
21:00	Otávio 1'; Mané (yellow card) 41'; Brozović (yellow card) 65'; Laporte (yellow card) 68'; Al-Khaibari (yellow card) 87'	Report	Kanno (yellow card) 24'; Neves (yellow card) 36'; Milinković-Savić (yellow card) 63'; Mitrović 90+10' (pen.)	Stadium: Al-Awwal Park; Attendance: 20,368; Referee: José María Sánchez Martínez (Spain)

23 May 2024 33	Al-Hilal	3–1	Al-Tai	Riyadh
21:00	S. Al-Dawsari 17'; Abdulhamid (yellow card) 22'; Michael 44', (yellow card) 45'; Malcom 60', (yellow card) 84'	Report	Cordea 64'	Stadium: Al-Shabab Club Stadium; Attendance: 9,315; Referee: Faisal Al-Blwi

27 May 2024 34	Al-Wehda	1–2	Al-Hilal	Mecca
21:00	Noor (yellow card) 69'; Al-Najei 77'; Al-Qarni (yellow card) 82'	Report	Kanno 19'; Koulibaly (yellow card) 45+1'; Mitrović 90+2'	Stadium: King Abdul Aziz Stadium; Attendance: 5,144; Referee: Shukri Al-Hanfoush

=== King Cup ===
All times are local, AST (UTC+3).

25 September 2023 Round of 32	Al-Jabalain	0–1	Al-Hilal	Ha'il
18:00	Al-Sharid (yellow card) 84'	Report	Neves 64'; Milinković-Savić (yellow card) 89'	Stadium: Prince Abdul Aziz bin Musa'ed Stadium; Referee: Matthew Conger (New Zealand)

30 October 2023 Round of 16	Al-Hilal	3–0	Al-Hazem	Riyadh
21:00	Neves 52' (pen.); Mitrović 79', 83' (pen.)	Report	Abousaban (yellow card) 48'	Stadium: King Fahd International Stadium; Attendance: 9,363; Referee: Facundo Tello (Argentina)

11 December 2023 Quarter-finals	Al-Hilal	3–0	Al Taawoun	Riyadh
17:45	Michael 45+2'; Mitrović 52'; Malcom 84'	Report		Stadium: Prince Faisal bin Fahd Stadium; Attendance: 11,467; Referee: Andrés Merlos (Argentina)

30 April 2024 Semi-finals	Al-Ittihad	1–2	Al-Hilal	Jeddah
21:00	Hegazi (yellow card) 30'; F. Al-Ghamdi (yellow card) 57'; Hamdallah 67'; Kadesh (yellow card) 90+5'	Report	Michael 25'; Milinković-Savić (red card) 42'; Mitrović (yellow card) 45+13'; Al-Bulaihi (yellow card) 50'; Abdulhamid 81'; Neves (yellow card) 90+3'	Stadium: King Abdullah Sports City; Attendance: 41,793; Referee: Benoît Bastien (France)

31 May 2024 Final	Al-Hilal	1–1 (a.e.t.) (5–4 p)	Al-Nassr	Jeddah
21:00	Mitrović 7'; Lodi (yellow card) 22'; Koulibaly (yellow card) 28' (yellow-red card) 90'; Al-Faraj (yellow card) 33'; Michael (yellow card) 40'; Al-Bulaihi (yellow card) 87', (red card) 87'; Al-Shahrani (yellow card) 98'; Kanno (yellow card) 108'	Report	Otávio (yellow card) 26'; Al-Amri (yellow card) 45+1'; Ospina (red card) 56'; Yahya 88'; Telles (yellow card) 106'; Al-Ghannam (yellow card) 120+1'	Stadium: King Abdullah Sports City; Attendance: 56,870; Referee: Darío Herrera (Argentina)
	Penalties
	Neves (penalty missed); Mitrović (penalty scored); Kanno (penalty scored); Tambakti (penalty scored); Al-Hamdan (penalty scored); Abdulhamid (penalty missed); N. Al-Dawsari (penalty scored)		(penalty missed) Telles; (penalty scored) Ronaldo; (penalty scored) Al-Najei; (penalty scored) Ghareeb; (penalty scored) Lajami; (penalty missed) Al-Hassan; (penalty missed) Al-Nemer

=== Champions League ===
==== Group stage ====
Pos	Team	Pld	W	D	L	GF	GA	GD	Pts	Qualification	HIL	NAV	NAS	MUM
1	(Saudi Arabia) Al-Hilal	6	5	1	0	16	2	+14	16	Advance to round of 16	—	1–1	2–1	6–0
2	(Uzbekistan) Navbahor	6	4	1	1	11	6	+5	13	Advance to round of 16	0–2	—	2–1	3–0
3	(Iran) Nassaji Mazandaran	6	2	0	4	7	10	−3	6		0–3	1–3	—	2–0
4	(India) Mumbai City	6	0	0	6	1	17	−16	0		0–2	1–2	0–2	—

Source: AFC
Rules for classification: Tiebreakers

18 September 2023 1	Al-Hilal (Saudi Arabia)	1–1	(Uzbekistan) Navbahor	Riyadh, Saudi Arabia
21:00 UTC+3	Neymar (yellow card) 60'; Al-Bulaihi 90+10'	Report	Ivanović (yellow card) 28'; Tabatadze 52'; Ismoilov (yellow card) 61'	Stadium: King Fahd International Stadium; Attendance: 26,713; Referee: Mohammed Abdulla (United Arab Emirates)

3 October 2023 2	Nassaji Mazandaran (Iran)	0–3	(Saudi Arabia) Al-Hilal	Tehran, Iran
19:30 UTC+3:30	Houshmand (red card) 38'; Janmaleki (yellow card) 45+9'	Report	Mitrović 18'; Al-Faraj (red card) 38'; Neymar 58'; Al-Shehri 90+3'	Stadium: Azadi Stadium; Attendance: 34,850; Referee: Ma Ning (China)

23 October 2023 3	Al-Hilal (Saudi Arabia)	6–0	(India) Mumbai City	Riyadh, Saudi Arabia
21:00 UTC+3	Mitrović 5', 67', 80'; Al-Bulaihi (yellow card) 34'; Koulibaly (yellow card) 49'; Milinković-Savić 75'; Al-Breik 82'; Al-Malki 90+5', (yellow card) 90+5'	Report	Van Nieff (yellow card) 14'; Partap Singh (yellow card) 41'	Stadium: King Fahd International Stadium; Attendance: 10,046; Referee: Muhammad Taqi (Singapore)

6 November 2023 4	Mumbai City (India)	0–2	(Saudi Arabia) Al-Hilal	Navi Mumbai, India
19:30 UTC+5:30	M. Singh (yellow card) 35' (yellow-red card) 54'; Pereyra Díaz (yellow card) 50'; B. Singh (yellow card) 90'	Report	Neves (yellow card) 29'; Mitrović (yellow card) 35', (goal) 85'; Michael 62'	Stadium: DY Patil Stadium; Attendance: 30,023; Referee: Adham Makhadmeh (Jordan)

28 November 2023 5	Navbahor (Uzbekistan)	0–2	(Saudi Arabia) Al-Hilal	Namangan, Uzbekistan
21:00 UTC+5	Đokić (yellow card) 10'; Yuldoshev (yellow card) 30' (yellow-red card) 90+8'; Ivanović (yellow card) 66'	Report	Al-Qahtani (yellow card) 58'; Malcom 68'; Al-Breik (yellow card) 80'; Abdulhamid (yellow card) 84'; S. Al-Dawsari 85'	Stadium: Markaziy Stadium; Attendance: 10,923; Referee: Salman Falahi (Qatar)

4 December 2023 6	Al-Hilal (Saudi Arabia)	2–1	(Iran) Nassaji Mazandaran	Riyadh, Saudi Arabia
19:00 UTC+3	Michael 4'; Al-Hamdan (yellow card) 45+1'; S. Al-Dawsari 54'; Al-Wotayan (yellow card) 57'; Al-Faraj (yellow card) 84'	Report	Rahmati (yellow card) 42', (goal) 77'; Mohammadzadeh (yellow card) 65'	Stadium: Prince Faisal bin Fahd Stadium; Attendance: 7,141; Referee: Mohanad Qasim Sarray (Iraq)

==== Knockout phase ====
===== Round of 16 =====
15 February 2024 First leg	Sepahan (Iran)	1–3	(Saudi Arabia) Al-Hilal	Isfahan, Iran
19:30 UTC+3:30	Karimi (yellow card) 29'; Rezaeian 37', (yellow card) 86'; Daneshgar (red card) 76'	Report	Malcom 57', (yellow card) 86'; Mitrović 90+4'; Al-Hamdan 90+7'	Stadium: Naghsh-e Jahan Stadium; Attendance: 61,265; Referee: Ahmad Al-Ali (Kuwait)

22 February 2024 Second leg	Al-Hilal (Saudi Arabia)	3–1 (6–2 agg.)	(Iran) Sepahan	Riyadh, Saudi Arabia
21:00 UTC+3	S. Al-Dawsari 76'; Neves 82'; Mitrović 90+7'	Report	Ahmadzadeh 54'; Yazdani (red card) 71'	Stadium: Kingdom Arena; Attendance: 18,055; Referee: Adel Al-Naqbi (United Arab Emirates)

===== Quarter-finals =====
5 March 2024 First leg	Al-Hilal (Saudi Arabia)	2–0	(Saudi Arabia) Al-Ittihad	Riyadh, Saudi Arabia
21:00 UTC+3	Mitrović 40' (pen.); S. Al-Dawsari 42'; Milinković-Savić (yellow card) 79'; Koulibaly (yellow card) 81'	Report	Kanté (red card) 66'	Stadium: Kingdom Arena; Attendance: 18,387; Referee: Shaun Evans (Australia)

12 March 2024 Second leg	Al-Ittihad (Saudi Arabia)	0–2 (0–4 agg.)	(Saudi Arabia) Al-Hilal	Jeddah, Saudi Arabia
21:00 UTC+3	Felipe (yellow card) 10'; Al-Amri (yellow card) 24'; A. Al-Ghamdi (yellow card) 35'; Al-Farhan (yellow card) 55'; F. Al-Ghamdi (yellow card) 85'; Hamdallah (red card) 90+1'; Hegazi (yellow card) 90+1'	Report	Al-Faraj (yellow card) 37'; Al-Shahrani 61'; Milinković-Savić (yellow card) 68'; Al-Bulaihi (yellow card) 90+1'; Malcom 90+5'	Stadium: King Abdullah Sports City; Attendance: 42,375; Referee: Ma Ning (China)

===== Semi-finals =====
17 April 2024 First leg	Al Ain (United Arab Emirates)	4–2	(Saudi Arabia) Al-Hilal	Al Ain, United Arab Emirates
20:00 UTC+4	Rahimi 6', 26' (pen.), 38' (pen.), (yellow card) 69'; Abbas (yellow card) 9'; Erik (yellow card) 45+7'; Kaku 56' (pen.)	Report	Al-Owais (yellow card) 26'; Al-Bulaihi (yellow card) 37'; Malcom 49'; S. Al-Dawsari 78'	Stadium: Hazza bin Zayed Stadium; Attendance: 21,226; Referee: Adham Makhadmeh (Jordan)
Note: The match was postponed from 16 April due to adverse weather conditions.

23 April 2024 Second leg	Al-Hilal (Saudi Arabia)	2–1 (4–5 agg.)	(United Arab Emirates) Al Ain	Riyadh, Saudi Arabia
21:00 UTC+3	Neves 4' (pen.); S. Al-Dawsari (yellow card) 38', (goal) 51'	Report	Autonne (yellow card) 3'; Erik 12'; Al-Ahbabi (yellow card) 19'; Nader (yellow card) 89'; Eisa (yellow card) 90+10'	Stadium: Kingdom Arena; Attendance: 18,445; Referee: Ahmed Al-Alili (United Arab Emirates)

=== Arab Club Champions Cup ===
==== Group stage ====
Pos	Team	Pld	W	D	L	GF	GA	GD	Pts	Qualification
1	(Qatar) Al-Sadd	3	2	1	0	4	2	+2	7	Advance to knockout stage
2	(Saudi Arabia) Al-Hilal	3	1	1	1	4	4	0	4	Advance to knockout stage
3	(Morocco) Wydad AC	3	0	2	1	2	3	−1	2	
4	(Libya) Al-Ahli Tripoli	3	0	2	1	1	2	−1	2	

Source: UAFA
Rules for classification: Group stage tiebreakers

27 July 2023 1	Al-Ahli Tripoli (Libya)	0–0	(Saudi Arabia) Al-Hilal	Abha
20:00 UTC+3	Ayed (yellow card) 82'; Hedhli (yellow card) 84'; Al Taher (yellow card) 90'; Krawa'a (yellow card) 90+2'	Report		Stadium: Prince Sultan bin Abdul Aziz Stadium; Referee: Adham Makhadmeh (Jordan)

30 July 2023 2	Al-Hilal (Saudi Arabia)	2–3	(Qatar) Al-Sadd	Abha
20:00 UTC+3	Michael 10'; Abdulhamid (yellow card) 19'; S. Al-Dawsari 68' (pen.)	Report	Sayyar (yellow card) 13'; Bounedjah 40', (yellow card) 40'; Salman 51'; Kheder (yellow card) 66'; Afif (yellow card) 77'; Plata 90+3', (yellow card) 90+4'	Stadium: Prince Sultan bin Abdul Aziz Stadium; Referee: Dahane Beida (Mauritania)

2 August 2023 3	Al-Hilal (Saudi Arabia)	2–1	(Morocco) Wydad AC	Abha
16:00 UTC+3	Milinković-Savić 41'; Al-Bulaihi (yellow card) 58'; Al-Hamdan (yellow card) 62'; Al-Shahrani (yellow card) 64'; Neves 66'; Al-Mayouf (yellow card) 81'; Kanno (yellow card) 90+2'	Report	Zola (yellow card) 3'; Moutaraji (yellow card) 21'; Aboulfath (yellow card) 47'; Draoui (yellow card) 61'; Bouhra 64'; Jabrane (yellow card) 78'; Ounajem (yellow card) 83'	Stadium: Prince Sultan bin Abdul Aziz Stadium; Referee: Ali Sabah (Iraq)

==== Knockout phase ====
5 August 2023 Quarter-finals	Al-Ittihad (Saudi Arabia)	1–3	(Saudi Arabia) Al-Hilal	Taif
21:00 UTC+3	Bamsaud (yellow card) 45+1'; Al-Amri (yellow card) 45+6'; Romarinho 56'; Al-Nashri (yellow card) 82'; Coronado (yellow card) 90'	Report	Milinković-Savić 14'; Michael (yellow card) 22'; S. Al-Dawsari 45+3' (pen.); Malcom 70'; Al-Bulaihi (yellow card) 78'	Stadium: King Fahd Stadium; Referee: Abdulrahman Al-Jassim (Qatar)

9 August 2023 Semi-finals	Al-Hilal (Saudi Arabia)	3–1	(Saudi Arabia) Al-Shabab	Taif
21:00 UTC+3	Kanno 9'; Neves (yellow card) 22'; Al-Mayouf (red card) 25'; Malcom 45+3'; Koulibaly (yellow card) 90+1'; Al-Hamdan 90+5'	Report	Al-Sibyani (yellow card) 8'; Cuéllar 56'; Al-Qahtani (yellow card) 71'	Stadium: King Fahd Stadium; Referee: Amin Omar (Egypt)

12 August 2023 Final	Al-Hilal (Saudi Arabia)	1–2 (a.e.t.)	(Saudi Arabia) Al-Nassr	Taif
18:00 UTC+3	Koulibaly (yellow card) 43'; Al-Bulaihi (yellow card) 44'; Michael 51'	Report	Brozović (yellow card) 32'; S. Al-Ghannam (yellow card) 44'; Mané (yellow card) 48'; Al-Amri (red card) 71'; Ronaldo 74', 97'; Konan (yellow card) 110'; Al-Sulaiheem (yellow card) 118'	Stadium: King Fahd Stadium; Referee: Redouane Jiyed (Morocco)

=== Saudi Super Cup ===
8 April 2024 Semi-finals	Al-Hilal	2–1	Al-Nassr	Abu Dhabi, United Arab Emirates
23:30 UTC+4	S. Al-Dawsari (yellow card) 28', (goal) 61'; Milinković-Savić (yellow card) 34'; Malcom 72'; Al-Bulaihi (yellow card) 86'	Report	Lajami (yellow card) 54'; Ronaldo (red card) 86'; Mané 90+9'	Stadium: Mohammed bin Zayed Stadium; Attendance: 34,000; Referee: Mohammed Al-Hoaish

11 April 2024 Final	Al-Ittihad	1–4	Al-Hilal	Abu Dhabi, United Arab Emirates
21:30 UTC+4	Hamdallah 21'; Al-Amri (yellow card) 39'	Report	Malcom 5', 89', (yellow card) 90'; Lodi (yellow card) 20'; S. Al-Dawsari 44'; Koulibaly (yellow card) 53'; N. Al-Dawsari 90+6'	Stadium: Mohammed bin Zayed Stadium; Attendance: 27,250; Referee: Khaled Al-Teris

== Statistics ==
=== Appearances ===
No.	Pos	Nat	Player	Total		Pro League		King Cup		Champions League		Arab Club Champions Cup		Super Cup	
No.	Pos	Nat	Player	Apps	Goals	Apps	Goals	Apps	Goals	Apps	Goals	Apps	Goals	Apps	Goals
Goalkeepers
17	GK	(Saudi Arabia) KSA	Mohammed Al-Rubaie	0	0	0	0	0	0	0	0	0	0	0	0
21	GK	(Saudi Arabia) KSA	Mohammed Al-Owais	10	0	1+1	0	0	0	7	0	1	0	0	0
31	GK	(Saudi Arabia) KSA	Habib Al-Wotayan	2	0	0	0	0	0	0+1	0	0+1	0	0	0
37	GK	(Morocco) MAR	Yassine Bounou	43	0	31	0	5	0	5	0	0	0	2	0
40	GK	(Saudi Arabia) KSA	Ahmed Abu Rasen	0	0	0	0	0	0	0	0	0	0	0	0
Defenders
2	DF	(Saudi Arabia) KSA	Mohammed Al-Breik	47	2	11+17	1	1+4	0	5+4	1	0+5	0	0	0
3	DF	(Senegal) SEN	Kalidou Koulibaly	50	2	30	2	4	0	8	0	6	0	2	0
4	DF	(Saudi Arabia) KSA	Khalifah Al-Dawsari	6	0	0+4	0	0	0	0+2	0	0	0	0	0
5	DF	(Saudi Arabia) KSA	Ali Al-Bulaihi	56	3	31+1	2	4	0	11+1	1	6	0	2	0
6	DF	(Brazil) BRA	Renan Lodi	14	0	10+1	0	1	0	0	0	0	0	1+1	0
12	DF	(Saudi Arabia) KSA	Yasser Al-Shahrani	50	2	15+13	1	4+1	0	8+1	1	5+1	0	1+1	0
16	DF	(Saudi Arabia) KSA	Nasser Al-Dawsari	40	2	6+19	1	1+3	0	0+6	0	1+3	0	0+1	1
32	DF	(Saudi Arabia) KSA	Muteb Al-Mufarrij	1	0	0+1	0	0	0	0	0	0	0	0	0
66	DF	(Saudi Arabia) KSA	Saud Abdulhamid	57	4	29+3	3	4+1	1	11+1	0	6	0	2	0
70	DF	(Saudi Arabia) KSA	Mohammed Jahfali	6	0	3+2	0	0	0	0	0	0+1	0	0	0
87	DF	(Saudi Arabia) KSA	Hassan Al-Tambakti	30	0	5+11	0	2+3	0	5+2	0	0	0	0+2	0
Midfielders
7	MF	(Saudi Arabia) KSA	Salman Al-Faraj	31	0	5+16	0	2	0	5+3	0	0	0	0	0
8	MF	(Portugal) POR	Rúben Neves	54	8	30+2	3	4+1	2	9	2	6	1	2	0
22	MF	(Serbia) SRB	Sergej Milinković-Savić	49	14	28+2	11	2+2	0	7+1	1	5	2	2	0
26	MF	(Saudi Arabia) KSA	Abdulellah Al-Malki	7	1	0+3	0	0+1	0	0+3	1	0	0	0	0
28	MF	(Saudi Arabia) KSA	Mohamed Kanno	54	5	11+19	4	2+3	0	7+4	0	5+1	1	0+2	0
29	MF	(Saudi Arabia) KSA	Salem Al-Dawsari	48	24	27	14	3	0	10	6	6	2	2	2
56	MF	(Saudi Arabia) KSA	Mohammed Al-Qahtani	14	1	2+6	1	0+1	0	1+3	0	0+1	0	0	0
96	MF	(Brazil) BRA	Michael	52	11	28+5	5	4	2	7	2	6	2	2	0
Forwards
9	FW	(Serbia) SRB	Aleksandar Mitrović	43	40	27+1	28	4+1	4	8+2	8	0	0	0	0
10	FW	(Brazil) BRA	Neymar	5	1	2+1	0	0	0	2	1	0	0	0	0
11	FW	(Saudi Arabia) KSA	Saleh Al-Shehri	27	6	4+10	5	1+3	0	3+4	1	0	0	1+1	0
14	FW	(Saudi Arabia) KSA	Abdullah Al-Hamdan	42	5	4+17	3	2+1	0	3+7	1	3+3	1	1+1	0
77	FW	(Brazil) BRA	Malcom	52	25	31	15	5	1	10+1	4	3	2	2	3
Players sent out on loan this season
43	MF	(Saudi Arabia) KSA	Musab Al-Juwayr	7	0	1+1	0	0	0	0+1	0	1+3	0	0	0
49	FW	(Saudi Arabia) KSA	Abdullah Radif	5	0	0+2	0	0	0	0	0	0+3	0	0	0
88	DF	(Saudi Arabia) KSA	Hamad Al-Yami	0	0	0	0	0	0	0	0	0	0	0	0
Player who made an appearance this season but left the club
1	GK	(Saudi Arabia) KSA	Abdullah Al-Mayouf	7	0	2	0	0	0	0	0	5	0	0	0
19	MF	(Peru) PER	André Carrillo	5	0	0	0	0	0	0	0	1+4	0	0	0
44	MF	(Saudi Arabia) KSA	Saad Al-Nasser	0	0	0	0	0	0	0	0	0	0	0	0
67	DF	(Saudi Arabia) KSA	Mohammed Al-Khaibari	0	0	0	0	0	0	0	0	0	0	0	0

=== Goalscorers ===
Rank	No.	Pos	Nat.	Player	Pro League	King Cup	Champions League	Arab Club Champions Cup	Super Cup	Total
1	9	FW	(Serbia)	Aleksandar Mitrović	28	4	8	0	0	40
2	77	FW	(Brazil)	Malcom	15	1	4	2	3	25
3	29	MF	(Saudi Arabia)	Salem Al-Dawsari	14	0	6	2	2	24
4	22	MF	(Serbia)	Sergej Milinković-Savić	11	0	1	2	0	14
5	96	MF	(Brazil)	Michael	5	2	2	2	0	11
6	8	MF	(Portugal)	Rúben Neves	3	2	2	1	0	8
7	11	FW	(Saudi Arabia)	Saleh Al-Shehri	5	0	1	0	0	6
8	14	FW	(Saudi Arabia)	Abdullah Al-Hamdan	3	0	1	1	0	5
8	28	MF	(Saudi Arabia)	Mohamed Kanno	4	0	0	1	0	5
10	66	DF	(Saudi Arabia)	Saud Abdulhamid	3	1	0	0	0	4
11	5	DF	(Saudi Arabia)	Ali Al-Bulaihi	2	0	1	0	0	3
12	2	DF	(Saudi Arabia)	Mohammed Al-Breik	1	0	1	0	0	2
12	3	DF	(Senegal)	Kalidou Koulibaly	2	0	0	0	0	2
12	12	DF	(Saudi Arabia)	Yasser Al-Shahrani	1	0	1	0	0	2
12	16	DF	(Saudi Arabia)	Nasser Al-Dawsari	1	0	0	0	1	2
16	10	FW	(Brazil)	Neymar	0	0	1	0	0	1
16	26	MF	(Saudi Arabia)	Abdulellah Al-Malki	0	0	1	0	0	1
16	56	MF	(Saudi Arabia)	Mohammed Al-Qahtani	1	0	0	0	0	1
Own goals					2	0	0	0	0	2
Totals					101	10	30	11	6	158

Last updated: 31 May 2024

=== Assists ===
Rank	No.	Pos.	Nat.	Player	Pro League	King Cup	Champions League	Arab Club Champions Cup	Super Cup	Total
1	22	MF	(Serbia)	Sergej Milinković-Savić	10	1	2	1	2	16
2	8	MF	(Portugal)	Rúben Neves	12	0	0	3	0	15
3	77	FW	(Brazil)	Malcom	6	3	2	1	0	12
4	2	DF	(Saudi Arabia)	Mohammed Al-Breik	5	0	6	0	0	11
5	66	DF	(Saudi Arabia)	Saud Abdulhamid	4	0	4	2	0	10
5	96	MF	(Brazil)	Michael	6	2	1	0	1	10
7	9	FW	(Serbia)	Aleksandar Mitrović	5	0	2	0	0	7
8	29	MF	(Saudi Arabia)	Salem Al-Dawsari	4	0	1	1	0	6
9	16	DF	(Saudi Arabia)	Nasser Al-Dawsari	2	0	2	0	0	4
10	7	MF	(Saudi Arabia)	Salman Al-Faraj	2	0	0	0	0	2
10	10	FW	(Brazil)	Neymar	2	0	0	0	0	2
10	11	FW	(Saudi Arabia)	Saleh Al-Shehri	0	0	0	0	2	2
10	12	DF	(Saudi Arabia)	Yasser Al-Shahrani	1	0	0	1	0	2
14	3	DF	(Senegal)	Kalidou Koulibaly	1	0	0	0	0	1
14	5	DF	(Saudi Arabia)	Ali Al-Bulaihi	0	0	1	0	0	1
14	6	DF	(Brazil)	Renan Lodi	1	0	0	0	0	1
14	14	FW	(Saudi Arabia)	Abdullah Al-Hamdan	0	0	1	0	0	1
14	28	MF	(Saudi Arabia)	Mohamed Kanno	1	0	0	0	0	1
Totals					62	6	22	9	5	103

Last updated: 31 May 2024

=== Clean sheets ===
Rank	No.	Pos.	Nat.	Player	Pro League	King Cup	Champions League	Arab Club Champions Cup	Super Cup	Total
1	37	GK	(Morocco)	Yassine Bounou	15	3	1	0	0	19
2	21	GK	(Saudi Arabia)	Mohammed Al-Owais	0	0	5	0	0	5
3	1	GK	(Saudi Arabia)	Abdullah Al-Mayouf	0	0	0	1	0	1
Totals					15	3	6	1	0	25

Last updated: 3 May 2024
