= Nuno Espírito Santo =

Portuguese football manager (born 1974)

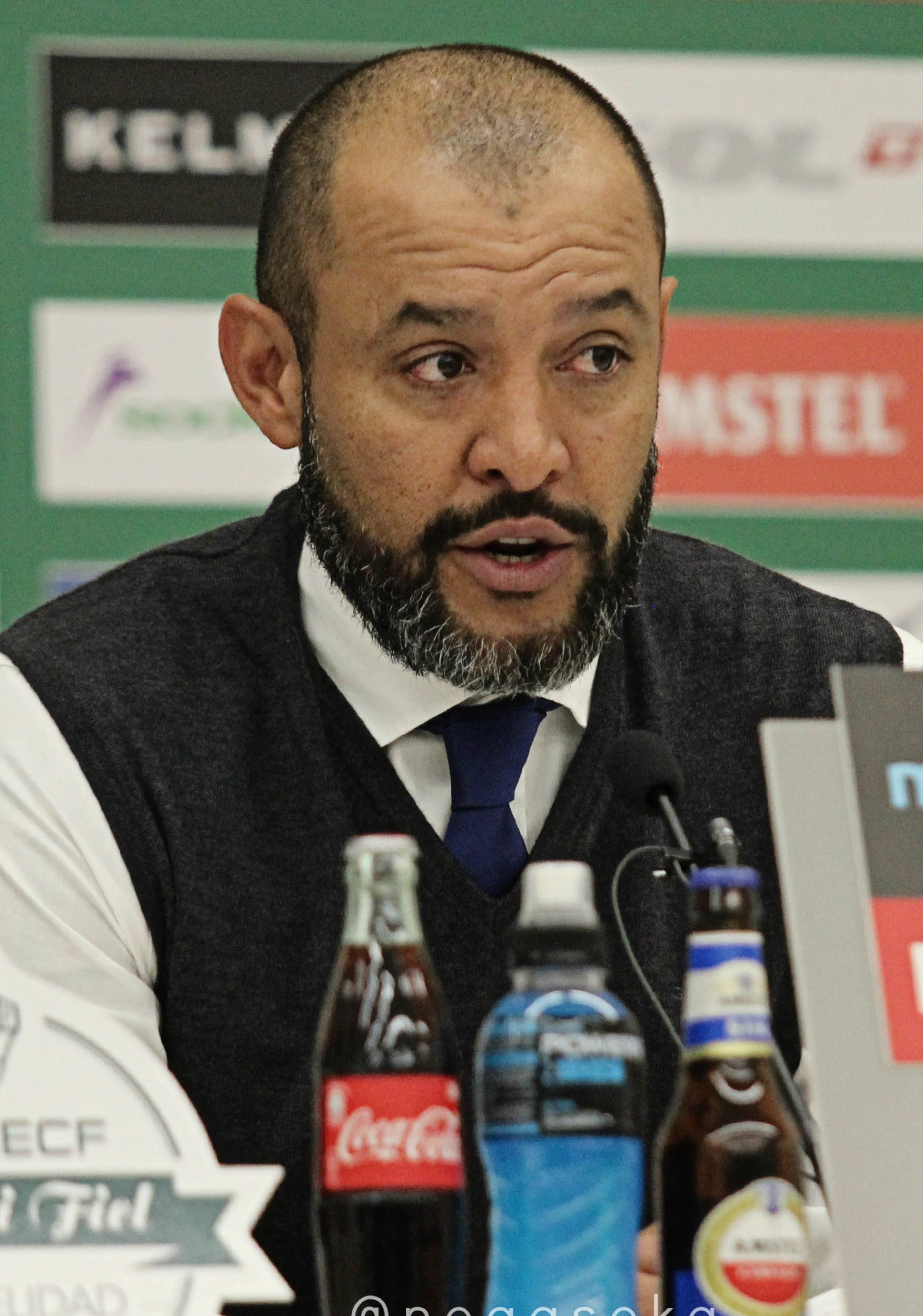
- Espírito Santo as manager of Valencia in 2015

Personal information
- Full name: Nuno Herlander Simões Espírito Santo
- Date of birth: 25 January 1974 (age 52)
- Place of birth: São Tomé, Portuguese São Tomé and Príncipe
- Height: 1.88 m (6 ft 2 in)
- Position: Goalkeeper

Youth career
- 1985–1986: Santoantoniense
- 1986–1987: Quimigal
- 1987–1991: Caçadores Torreenses
- 1991–1992: Vitória Guimarães

Senior career*
Years	Team	Apps	(Gls)
1992–1996	Vitória Guimarães	34	(0)
1993–1994	→ Vila Real (loan)	19	(0)
1997–2002	Deportivo La Coruña	4	(0)
1998–2000	→ Mérida (loan)	69	(0)
2000–2001	→ Osasuna (loan)	33	(0)
2002–2004	Porto	16	(0)
2005–2006	Dynamo Moscow	11	(0)
2007	Aves	15	(0)
2007–2010	Porto	8	(0)
Total		209	(0)

International career
1992	Portugal U18	1	(0)
1995	Portugal U21	3	(0)
1996	Portugal U23	5	(0)
2000–2001	Portugal B	3	(0)

Managerial career
- 2012–2014: Rio Ave
- 2014–2015: Valencia
- 2016–2017: Porto
- 2017–2021: Wolverhampton Wanderers
- 2021: Tottenham Hotspur
- 2022–2023: Al-Ittihad
- 2023–2025: Nottingham Forest
- 2025–2026: West Ham United
- * Club domestic league appearances and goals

Nuno Herlander Simões Espírito Santo (born 25 January 1974), known as Nuno Espírito Santo (Portuguese pronunciation: [ˈnunu (i)ˈʃpiɾitu ˈsɐ̃tu]) or simply Nuno, is a Portuguese football manager and former player who was most recently head coach of EFL Championship club West Ham United.

During his career, in which he played as a goalkeeper, Espírito Santo first made a name for himself in Spain, playing for three teams in five years. He later returned to Portugal to represent Porto, and also played professionally in Russia. He was part of the Portuguese squad at UEFA Euro 2008, but never won a cap for the national team.

Espírito Santo started his coaching career at the Greek club Panathinaikos as an assistant. He became a coach in 2012, leading Portuguese club Rio Ave to both domestic cup finals in 2014. After brief spells at Valencia in Spain's La Liga, and a return to Porto, he managed Wolverhampton Wanderers for four years. In 2021, he took over as manager of Tottenham Hotspur, but was relieved of his duties after four months in charge. He became manager of Al-Ittihad Club in July 2022 where he won a league title and Saudi Super Cup before being dismissed in November 2023. The following month, he returned to the Premier League as head coach of Nottingham Forest. He was dismissed in September 2025 and later that month was appointed head coach of West Ham United, before being sacked in November 2026.

== Club career ==
=== Early career / Deportivo ===
Espírito Santo was born in São Tomé, Portuguese São Tomé and Príncipe, before moving to Portugal at the age of 8. He started his football career with Vitória Guimarães. After a meeting with the then Porto nightclub owner Jorge Mendes, Espírito Santo became the agent's first client in 1996. Mendes brokered a $1 million transfer the following January to La Liga's Deportivo La Coruña, although Espírito Santo spent three of his six seasons at the club out on loan, backing up Jacques Songo'o (1996–1998) and José Francisco Molina (2001–02) when he was part of the team. He was the preferred goalkeeper for the winning campaign in the Copa del Rey in the latter season, although Javier Irureta played Molina in the final victory over Real Madrid.

In 1999–2000, as he represented Mérida in the Segunda División, Espírito Santo won the Ricardo Zamora Trophy and helped the team finish sixth, but the club would be relegated to Segunda División B due to irregularities. He was loaned to Osasuna the following season, going on to rank seventh in the Zamora as his team finished only one point above the relegation zone in the top tier.

=== Porto ===
José Mourinho's Porto paid €3 million to sign Espírito Santo in July 2002, as a part of the deal that saw Jorge Andrade join Deportivo. During a 2003 Taça de Portugal match against Varzim, he was allowed by Mourinho to convert a penalty kick, scoring the club's last goal in a 7–0 home win. In May 2004, Espírito Santo was an unused substitute for the final as Porto won the 2003–04 UEFA Champions League. On 12 December, he replaced club great Vítor Baía during extra time of the 2004 Intercontinental Cup final penalty shoot-out victory against Once Caldas. However, in January, he was sold to Russian Premier League club Dynamo Moscow.

In January 2007, Espírito Santo returned to Portugal for a stint with Aves, eventually relegated from the Primeira Liga. He returned to Porto in July, backing up Brazilian Helton during most of his spell. Despite his limited involvement on the pitch – earning him the nickname O Substituto – he was considered a leader at the club.

Espírito Santo again played second-fiddle to Helton during the 2008–09 season, appearing in only four games, but was the starter throughout the domestic cup campaign, including the 1–0 final win against Paços de Ferreira.

== International career ==
Born in São Tomé and Príncipe, Espírito Santo moved to Portugal at a young age and holds dual Portuguese and Santomean citizenship. He represented Portugal at the 1996 Summer Olympics, playing four matches for the fourth-placed team. He also played for the nation's B team. Uncapped, he was called to the senior squad competing in UEFA Euro 2008, replacing the injured Quim, but did not play a match.

== Coaching career ==
=== Beginnings ===
On 21 June 2010, Porto announced that Espírito Santo's contract would not be renewed. The 36-year-old said he would always support Porto as he left. After his retirement, he rejoined former Porto manager Jesualdo Ferreira, moving to Málaga as a goalkeeping coach, before the pair signed for Panathinaikos in November.

=== Rio Ave ===
In May 2012, Rio Ave dismissed manager Carlos Brito and announced the appointment of Espírito Santo. In his first match in charge on 18 August, the team lost 1–0 at home to Marítimo in the first game of the 2012–13 Primeira Liga season. He recorded his first win nine days later, by the same margin away to Sporting CP.

In his second season in charge, Espírito Santo's team reached both the Taça de Portugal and Taça da Liga finals, therefore leading them to the UEFA Europa League for the first time in their history.

=== Valencia ===
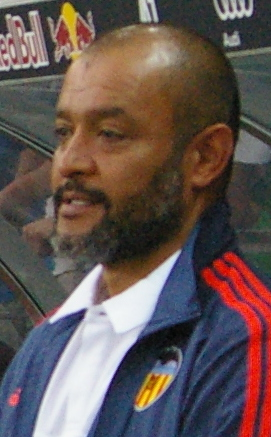
Espírito Santo as manager of Valencia in 2015

Espírito Santo signed a one-year contract with Valencia in La Liga on 4 July 2014, replacing Juan Antonio Pizzi. On 12 January 2015, he agreed to an extension to keep him at the club until 2018, and he eventually led them to a fourth place finish in his first season, Highlights included a 2–1 home win over Real Madrid and a 2–2 away draw against the same opponent, while he was named La Liga Manager of the Month three times. He resigned on 29 November 2015, following a 1–0 away defeat to Sevilla, after a poor start to both Valencia's La Liga and Champions League campaigns.

During his time at Valencia, Espírito Santo, his agent Jorge Mendes and club owner Peter Lim were criticised for signing the agent's clients. Roberto Ayala, who won several trophies as a Valencia player and later became a scout, left the club, alleging that they were signing such players for inflated fees.

=== Porto ===
On 1 June 2016, Espírito Santo signed a two-year contract with Porto, replacing former head coach José Peseiro. His first game on 12 August was a return to the Estádio dos Arcos, where his team came from behind to beat Rio Ave 3–1. However, after a season devoid of silverware which included a second-place finish in the league, he was relieved of his duties on 22 May 2017.

=== Wolverhampton Wanderers ===
On 31 May 2017, Espírito Santo was named as the new head coach of EFL Championship club Wolverhampton Wanderers, signing a three-year contract. He was voted the competition's Manager of the Month in November as his team won all four of their games, scoring 13 goals. Espírito Santo led the club to the Premier League after a six-year absence, achieving promotion with four matches remaining in the season and being confirmed as champions with two games to spare. On 10 July 2018, it was announced that his contract had been extended until 2021.

Espírito Santo was awarded the Premier League Manager of the Month title in his second month managing in the English top division after his team went unbeaten in September 2018, accruing ten points from four matches and only conceding one goal. It was the first time that a Wolves manager had secured the award, in the club's fifth season in the competition. Wolves finished seventh in the 2018–19 league season; it was the club's highest Premier League ranking, and their highest in the English top-flight since the 1979–80 season when they finished sixth. Wolves also qualified for a European competition for the first time since the 1980–81 UEFA Cup, reaching the UEFA Europa League.

Espírito Santo was awarded the Premier League Manager of the Month title for a second time on 10 July 2020 for a run of five fixtures unbeaten between the beginning of March and the end of June, sandwiching the temporary suspension of the 2019–20 Premier League due to the COVID-19 pandemic in the United Kingdom. The run included four wins and four clean sheets. The season saw Espírito Santo's team achieve a second consecutive seventh-place finish in the Premier League (with a record points total for Wolves in the Premier League of 59), and reach the quarter-finals of the UEFA Europa League, the club's best such performance since being finalists in the 1971–72 UEFA Cup.

On 13 September 2020, at the outset of the 2020–21 season, Espírito Santo's contract at the club was extended until summer 2023. He was named the Premier League Manager of the Month for October with a run of four fixtures unbeaten, including three wins without conceding; this was the third time he had received the award. On 27 February 2021, he took charge of his 102nd Premier League game as Wolves head coach as his team played out a 1–1 draw with Newcastle United at St James' Park, surpassing Mick McCarthy as the longest-serving Wolves head coach in the Premier League era. On 21 May, Wolves announced that Espírito Santo would leave the club by mutual consent at the end of the season.

=== Tottenham Hotspur ===
On 30 June 2021, Tottenham Hotspur announced Espírito Santo as their new head coach on a two-year contract with an option to extend for a third year. On his debut on 15 August, the team won 1–0 at home against reigning champions Manchester City through a Son Heung-min goal. On 29 August, he achieved the best start to a Premier League season for Tottenham after beating Watford to secure three wins from their first three matches. He won the Premier League Manager of the Month award for August, the fourth of his career. On 1 November, after his team lost 3–0 at home to Manchester United, their fifth loss in seven matches and which left them ninth in the table, Espírito Santo was dismissed after less than four months in charge. He was replaced the following day by Antonio Conte.

=== Al-Ittihad ===
On 4 July 2022, Espírito Santo was appointed by Al-Ittihad in the Saudi Pro League. He held talks for a return to Wolves in October. He won the 2022 Saudi Super Cup on 29 January 2023 with a 2–0 final win over Al Fayha. On 27 May, he won the club's first league title in 14 years, also after beating Al-Fayha 3–0 with one match remaining in the league.

Espírito Santo was dismissed on 8 November 2023, two days after a 2–0 loss to Iraqi club Al-Quwa Al-Jawiya in the 2023–24 AFC Champions League.

=== Nottingham Forest ===
==== 2023–24: Relegation battle ====
On 20 December 2023, Espírito Santo was appointed head coach of Premier League club Nottingham Forest, following the dismissal of Steve Cooper. His appointment at Nottingham Forest also reunited him with former players at Wolves, such as Morgan Gibbs-White and Willy Boly.

The side's first win under his tenure came on 26 December as they beat Newcastle United 3–1. This was followed by a 2–1 home win against Manchester United, which was Forest's first Premier League victory over the club in 29 years.

On the final day of the season, Espírito Santo led Forest to a 2–1 away win over Burnley to secure the club's survival from relegation with a 17th-placed finish in the league.

==== 2024–25: Pushing up the table and departure ====
On 14 September 2024, Espírito Santo led Forest to a 1–0 away win over Liverpool at Anfield, which was the first time the club had won at Liverpool in any competition since February 1969, ending a 25-game winless run at Anfield, and securing Espírito Santo's first ever Premier League victory against Liverpool. Callum Hudson-Odoi scored the winning goal in the 72nd minute.

Espírito Santo led Nottingham Forest to their first win at Old Trafford since 1994 on 7 December 2024, securing a 3–2 victory over Manchester United.

After securing a sixth consecutive Premier League win with a 3–0 away victory over Wolverhampton Wanderers at Molineux on 6 January 2025, Nottingham Forest sat third in the Premier League table on the same 40-point total as Arsenal in second place. This defied the expectations of many journalists and pundits, who had predicted at the start of the season that Forest would struggle and get relegated to the EFL Championship. Subsequently, Espírito Santo won the Premier League Manager of the Month award for his oversight of Forest's performances in December 2024.

In April 2025, Espírito Santo was announced as the Premier League Manager of the Month for March. This marks the third time he has won the award this season, having previously claimed it in October and December 2024. He became the first Nottingham Forest manager to win the award three times in a single season. He ultimately led the club to a seventh-place finish and qualification for the Europa League, marking their first participation in European football in 30 years.

On 21 June 2025, Nuno signed a new contract to stay with Nottingham Forest until 2028. However, on 9 September 2025, he was dismissed from his duties only three Premier League games into the new season. His departure was primarily due to his relationship with owner Evangelos Marinakis breaking down over the summer, with Nuno also publicly expressing his displeasure with the club's activity in the transfer market.

=== West Ham United ===
On 27 September 2025, Espírito Santo was appointed head coach of Premier League club West Ham United on a three-year contract, following the dismissal of Graham Potter. His arrival meant that he would reunite with former Wolves player Maximilian Kilman and bought Adama Traoré from Fulham in the January transfer window. He started his tenure as manager with a 1–1 draw at the Hill Dickinson Stadium against Everton on 29 September. On 1 November, his first win came in a 3–1 win over Newcastle United with goals from Lucas Paquetá, Tomáš Souček and an own goal from Sven Botman and it was the first time the Hammers won at home since beating Leicester City 2–0 in February.

Following West Ham United's relegation from the Premier League at the end of the 2025–26 season, Nuno Espírito Santo experienced the first relegation of his managerial career. Despite arriving midway through the campaign and overseeing an improvement in results after Christmas, West Ham's poor early-season form ultimately proved too damaging, with the club finishing in the bottom three after 14 consecutive seasons in the top flight.

Despite a slow start to the 2026–27 season, he was named Championship Manager of the Month for September 2026 having picked up thirteen points from five matches as the club climbed to second in the league. However, on 3 November 2026 Espírito Santo was sacked by West Ham after a run of just two wins in six matches. Scott Parker replaced him.

== Personal life ==
Espírito Santo and his wife Sandra have three children as of 2020. On 4 May 2019, he was awarded an Honorary Doctorate in Sport by the University of Wolverhampton.

== Managerial statistics ==
As of match played 31 October 2026

Managerial record by team and tenure
Team	From	To	Record					Ref.
Team	From	To	P	W	D	L	Win %	Ref.
Rio Ave	15 May 2012	19 May 2014	80	32	17	31	40.0	
Valencia	4 July 2014	29 November 2015	62	32	16	14	51.6	
Porto	1 June 2016	22 May 2017	49	27	16	6	55.1	
Wolverhampton Wanderers	31 May 2017	23 May 2021	199	95	49	55	47.7	
Tottenham Hotspur	30 June 2021	1 November 2021	17	8	2	7	47.1	
Al-Ittihad	4 July 2022	7 November 2023	56	36	12	8	64.3	
Nottingham Forest	20 December 2023	9 September 2025	73	28	20	25	38.4	
West Ham United	27 September 2025	3 November 2026	53	19	15	19	35.8	
Total			588	277	146	165	47.1	

== Honours ==
=== Player ===
Deportivo

- Copa del Rey: 2001–02

Porto

- Primeira Liga: 2002–03, 2003–04, 2007–08, 2008–09
- Taça de Portugal: 2002–03, 2008–09
- Supertaça Cândido de Oliveira: 2003, 2004, 2009
- UEFA Champions League: 2003–04
- UEFA Cup: 2002–03
- Intercontinental Cup: 2004
- Taça da Liga runner-up: 2009–10

Individual

- Ricardo Zamora Trophy: 1999–2000 (Segunda División)

=== Manager ===
Wolverhampton Wanderers

- EFL Championship: 2017–18

Al-Ittihad

- Saudi Pro League: 2022–23
- Saudi Super Cup: 2022

Individual

- La Liga Manager of the Month: September 2014, December 2014, February 2015
- EFL Championship Manager of the Month: November 2017
- LMA Manager of the Year: 2017–18 EFL Championship
- Premier League Manager of the Month: September 2018, June 2020, October 2020, August 2021, October 2024, December 2024, March 2025
- Saudi Pro League Manager of the Month: March 2023, April 2023, August 2023
