= Mohammed Al-Owais =

Saudi Arabian footballer (born 1991)

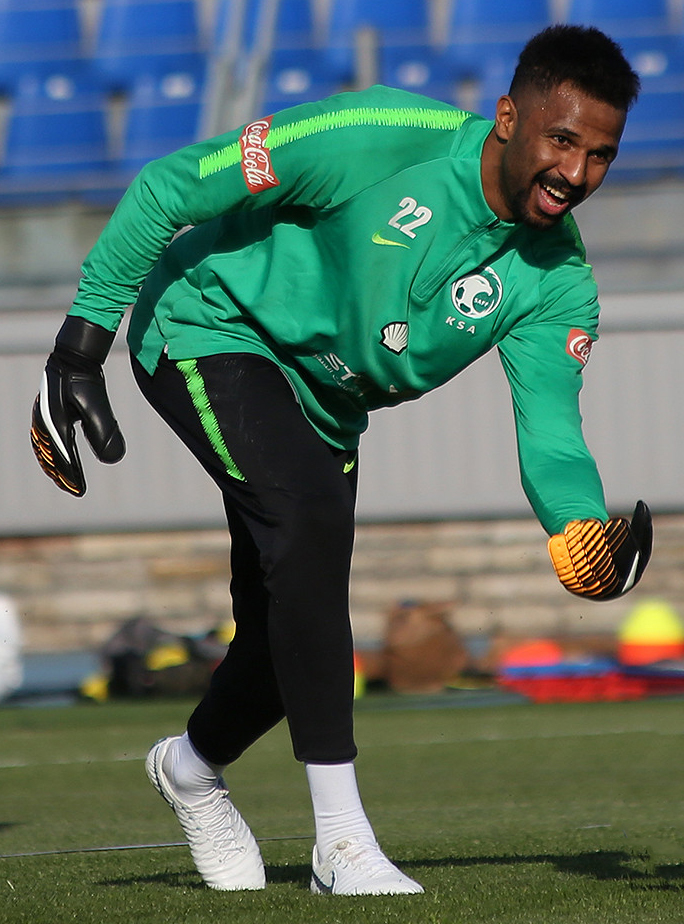
- Al-Owais in 2018

Personal information
- Full name: Mohammed Khalil Ibrahim Al-Owais
- Date of birth: 10 October 1991 (age 35)
- Place of birth: Al-Hasa, Saudi Arabia
- Height: 1.87 m (6 ft 2 in)
- Position: Goalkeeper

Team information
- Current team: Al Hilal
- Number: 33

Youth career
- 2008-2012: Al-Shabab

Senior career*
Years	Team	Apps	(Gls)
2012–2017	Al-Shabab	31	(0)
2017–2022	Al-Ahli	92	(0)
2022–2025	Al-Hilal	9	(0)
2025–2026	Al-Ula	35	(0)
2026–	Al-Hilal	1	(0)

International career^{‡}
2012–2014	Saudi Arabia U23		
2015–	Saudi Arabia	74	(0)
Medal record
Men's football
Representing Saudi Arabia
Arabian Gulf Cup
Winner	2026 Saudi Arabia
- * Club domestic league appearances and goals as of 22:03, 7 September 2026 (UTC) ‡ National team caps and goals as of 18:06, 13 November 2026 (UTC)

Mohammed Khalil Ibrahim Al-Owais (Arabic: مُحَمَّد خَلِيل إِبْرَاهِيم الْعُوَيْس; born 10 October 1991) is a Saudi Arabian professional footballer who plays as a goalkeeper for the Al Hilal and the Saudi Arabia national team. He is known for his quick reflexes and vigilance in goal.

== Club career ==
On 26 July 2017, Al-Owais joined Al-Ahli on a free transfer. On 30 January 2022, Al-Owais joined Al-Hilal. On 28 May 2025, Al-Owais joined First Division League side Al-Ula.

== International career ==
=== 2015–2016: FIFA World Cup 2018 qualifiers ===
Al-Owais was called up to the senior Saudi Arabia squad for a 2018 FIFA World Cup qualifier against Timor-Leste in September 2015. He made his debut against Japan in 2018 FIFA World Cup Qualification on 15 November 2016.

=== 2018: FIFA World Cup 2018 performance ===
In May 2018, he was named in Saudi Arabia's preliminary squad for the 2018 World Cup in Russia. He originally served as the second choice goalkeeper behind regular Abdullah Al-Mayouf. However, Al-Mayouf performed horribly in the opener against Russia as Saudi Arabia suffered a humiliating 5–0 defeat. This led to Al-Owais being promoted as the first-choice keeper instead. Al-Owais played in Saudi Arabia's 1–0 loss to Uruguay, where he made some good saves even though that was not enough to save Saudi Arabia from elimination. This was Al-Owais' only game in Russia.

=== 2019: AFC Asian Cup 2019 performance ===
Al-Owais was included in Saudi Arabia's squad for the 2019 AFC Asian Cup in the United Arab Emirates. However, he produced a rather mediocre performance, only keeping a clean sheet twice, against weaker North Korea and Lebanon, as Saudi Arabia won both games. Against Qatar and Japan though, he conceded three goals, especially against the latter as his side lost an important game in the round of sixteen and thus Saudi Arabia was eliminated.

=== 2022: Impressive performance at the 2022 FIFA World Cup ===
On 22 November 2022, during a 2022 FIFA World Cup match against Argentina, Al-Owais was named player of the match for his goalkeeping performance, which contributed to a historic 2–1 upset victory for Saudi Arabia. Along with his teammates, Al-Owais was reportedly gifted a Rolls-Royce as a result of the team’s significant victory. However, he then conceded twice to Poland, becoming the victim of Robert Lewandowski's first World Cup goal, as Saudi Arabia succumbed to the Poles and thus lost the advantage gained from the shock win against Argentina.

Later, Al-Owais also gained prominence for his acrobatic saves against Mexico, which contributed to the elimination of Mexico from the group stage for the first time since 1978. However, Saudi Arabia still suffered a 2–1 defeat to the Mexicans in the end and as for the result, despite heroic efforts by Al-Owais, his team failed to progress from the group stage once again as Saudi Arabia stood bottom.

On 31 May 2026, he was named in the 26-man squad for the 2026 FIFA World Cup.

== Personal life ==
Al-Owais is a Muslim. In March 2025, he became father of a boy named Ahmed.

== Career statistics ==
=== Club ===
As of 31 May 2025.

Appearances and goals by club, season and competition
Club	Season	League		King Cup		Crown Prince Cup (Note: Discontinued in 19 September 2017)		Continental		Other		Total	
Club	Season	Apps	Goals	Apps	Goals	Apps	Goals	Apps	Goals	Apps	Goals	Apps	Goals
Al-Shabab	2013–14	0	0	0	0	0	0	1	0	—		1	0
Al-Shabab	2014–15	8	0	3	0	2	0	4	0	—		17	0
Al-Shabab	2015–16	22	0	0	0	4	0	—		—		26	0
Al-Shabab	2016–17	1	0	0	0	2	0	—		—		3	0
Al-Shabab	Total	31	0	3	0	8	0	5	0	0	0	47	0
Al-Ahli	2017–18	24	0	1	0	—		4	0	—		29	0
Al-Ahli	2018–19	26	0	0	0	—		8	0	7 (Note: Appearances in Arab Club Champions Cup)	0	41	0
Al-Ahli	2019–20	13	0	1	0	—		5	0	—		19	0
Al-Ahli	2020–21	20	0	1	0	—		6	0	—		27	0
Al-Ahli	2021–22	9	0	0	0	—		—		—		9	0
Al-Ahli	Total	92	0	3	0	0	0	23	0	7	0	125	0
Al Hilal	2021–22	1	0	0	0	—		1	0	1 (Note: Appearances in FIFA Club World Cup)	0	3	0
Al Hilal	2022–23	5	0	0	0	—		0	0	0	0	5	0
Al Hilal	2023–24	2	0	0	0	—		7	0	1	0	10	0
Al Hilal	2024–25	1	0	1	0	—		1	0	0	0	3	0
Al Hilal	Total	9	0	1	0	0	0	9	0	2	0	21	0
Career total		132	0	7	0	8	0	37	0	9	0	193	0

=== International ===
Statistics accurate as of match played 13 November 2026.

Saudi Arabia
Year	Apps	Goals
2015	2	0
2016	1	0
2017	2	0
2018	9	0
2019	7	0
2021	9	0
2022	15	0
2023	7	0
2024	10	0
2026	12	0
Total	74	0

== Honours ==
Al-Shabab

- King Cup: 2014
- Saudi Super Cup: 2014

Al-Hilal

- Saudi Professional League: 2021–22, 2023–24
- King Cup: 2022–23, 2023–24
- Saudi Super Cup: 2023, 2024

Saudi Arabia

- Arabian Gulf Cup: 2026

Individual

- Saudi Professional League Goalkeeper of the Season: 2017–18
- Arabian Gulf Cup Goalkeeper Of The Tournament: 2026
