= Hassan Al-Tambakti =

Saudi Arabian footballer

- Al-Tambakti with Saudi Arabia in 2026

Personal information
- Full name: Hassan Mohammed Osama Al-Tambakti
- Date of birth: 9 February 1999 (age 27)
- Place of birth: Riyadh, Saudi Arabia
- Height: 1.82 m (6 ft 0 in)
- Position: Centre-back

Team information
- Current team: Al-Hilal
- Number: 87

Youth career
- 2012–2018: Al-Shabab

Senior career*
| Years | Team | Apps | (Gls) |
| 2018–2023 | Al-Shabab | 48 | (0) |
| 2019–2020 | → Al-Wehda (loan) | 8 | (0) |
| 2023– | Al-Hilal | 75 | (1) |

International career^{‡}
| 2017–2019 | Saudi Arabia U20 | 19 | (2) |
| 2019–2022 | Saudi Arabia U23 | 13 | (0) |
| 2019– | Saudi Arabia | 62 | (1) |
- * Club domestic league appearances and goals as of 31 October 2026 ‡ National team caps and goals as of 17 November 2026

Hassan Mohammed Osama Al-Tambakti (Note: Arabic: حسان محمد أسامة التمبكتي) (born 9 February 1999) is a Saudi Arabian professional footballer who plays as a centre-back for the Saudi Pro League club Al Hilal and the Saudi Arabia national team.

== Club career ==
Al-Tambakti is an academy graduate of Al-Shabab and signed his first professional contract with the club in May 2018. He signed a one-year contract extension in February 2019. He made his debut for the first team in the King Cup match against Al-Sahel on 2 January 2019. On 31 August 2019, Al-Tambakti was loaned out to fellow Pro League side Al-Wehda. He made his debut for Al-Wehda on 27 September 2019 in the league match against Al-Fateh. He made eight appearances for Al-Wehda before returning to Al-Shabab following the conclusion of the season. On 4 January 2023, Al-Tambakti renewed his contract with Al-Shabab until the end of the 2026–27 season.

On 21 August 2023, Al-Tambakti joined rivals Al-Hilal for a reported fee of SAR46 million, becoming the most expensive Saudi player in history.

== International career ==
Al-Tambakti was first called up to Saudi Arabia national football team in 2019 for the game against Singapore in the 2022 FIFA World Cup qualification – AFC second round, but did not play. He made his debut for the Green Falcons against Paraguay on 19 November in a friendly. Throughout the qualification, Al-Tambakti didn't play a major role as Saudi Arabia qualified with an impressive result.

Despite lack of time playing for the senior side in the qualifiers, his strong performance for the U-23 team as Saudi Arabia won the 2022 AFC U-23 Asian Cup allowed him to be included in the final tournament. He gave a great impression in the first game against Argentina as he played a small but instrumental role in helping Saudi Arabia to stun Argentina with a historic 2–1 win. However, Al-Tambakti would go on to become the reason for Saudi Arabia's eventual group stage exit, as his foul on Henry Martín in the match against Mexico was utilised by Luis Chávez, who scored a thunderous free kick as Saudi Arabia crumbled to Mexico by the same scoreline and finished in the bottom place.

Al-Tambakti scored his first international goal on 30 May 2025 in a friendly against Jordan at the Al-Ettifaq Club Stadium.

On 31 May 2026, he was named in the 26-man squad for the 2026 FIFA World Cup.

== Career statistics ==
=== Club ===
As of match played 18 January 2025

| Club | Season | League | | King Cup | | Asia | | Other | | Total | |
| Club | Season | Apps | Goals | Apps | Goals | Apps | Goals | Apps | Goals | Apps | Goals |
|---|---|---|---|---|---|---|---|---|---|---|---|
| Al-Shabab | 2018–19 | 0 | 0 | 1 | 0 | – | | – | | 1 | 0 |
| Al-Shabab | 2020–21 | 13 | 0 | 1 | 0 | – | | 0 | 0 | 14 | 0 |
| Al-Shabab | 2021–22 | 7 | 0 | 1 | 0 | 3 | 0 | – | | 11 | 0 |
| Al-Shabab | 2022–23 | 27 | 0 | 1 | 0 | 2 | 0 | 3 (Note: Appearances in Arab Club Champions Cup) | 1 | 33 | 1 |
| Al-Shabab | 2023–24 | 1 | 0 | 0 | 0 | – | | 5 | 0 | 6 | 0 |
| Al-Shabab | Total | 48 | 0 | 4 | 0 | 5 | 0 | 8 | 1 | 65 | 1 |
| Al-Wehda (loan) | 2019–20 | 8 | 0 | 0 | 0 | – | | – | | 8 | 0 |
| Al-Hilal | 2023–24 | 16 | 0 | 5 | 0 | 7 | 0 | 2 (Note: Appearances in Saudi Super Cup) | 0 | 30 | 0 |
| Al-Hilal | 2024–25 | 8 | 0 | 1 | 0 | 4 | 0 | 2 | 0 | 15 | 0 |
| Al-Hilal | Total | 24 | 0 | 6 | 0 | 11 | 0 | 4 | 0 | 45 | 0 |
| Career total | | 80 | 0 | 10 | 0 | 16 | 0 | 12 | 1 | 118 | 1 |

=== International ===
Scores and results list Saudi Arabia goal tally first, score column indicates score after each Al-Tambakti goal

List of international goals scored by Hassan Al-Tambakti
| No. | Date | Venue | Opponent | Score | Result | Competition |
|---|---|---|---|---|---|---|
| 1 | 30 May 2025 | Al-Ettifaq Club Stadium, Dammam, Saudi Arabia | Jordan | 2–0 | 2–0 | Friendly |

== Honours ==
Al-Hilal

- Saudi Pro League: 2023–24
- King's Cup: 2023–24
- Saudi Super Cup: 2023, 2024

Saudi Arabia U20

- AFC U-19 Championship: 2018

Saudi Arabia U23

- AFC U-23 Asian Cup: 2022
