= Mohammed al-Qahtani (football) =

Saudi Arabian footballer (born 2002)

Personal information
- Full name: Mohammed bin Hamad bin Dwaihi al-Swaidan al-Qahtani
- Date of birth: 23 July 2002 (age 24)
- Place of birth: Riyadh, Saudi Arabia
- Height: 1.68 m (5 ft 6 in)
- Position: Winger

Team information
- Current team: Al-Qadsiah
- Number: 15

Youth career
- 2014-2021: Al-Hilal

Senior career*
Years	Team	Apps	(Gls)
2021–2026	Al-Hilal	39	(6)
2026	→ Al-Taawoun (loan)	13	(1)
2026–	Al-Qadsiah	7	(1)

International career^{‡}
2016–2018	Saudi Arabia U17		
2019–2021	Saudi Arabia U20		
2022–	Saudi Arabia U23		
2021–	Saudi Arabia	12	(0)
Medal record
Men's football
Representing Saudi Arabia
Islamic Solidarity Games
Silver medal – second place	2021 Konya
- * Club domestic league appearances and goals as of 11 September 2026 ‡ National team caps and goals as of 13 November 2026

Mohammed bin Hamad bin Dwaihi al-Swaidan al-Qahtani (Arabic: محمد القحطاني; born 23 July 2002) is a Saudi Arabian professional footballer who plays as a winger for Saudi Pro League side Al-Qadsiah. He also plays for the Saudi Arabia national team and was part of the national side that participated in the 2021 FIFA Arab Cup.

== Club career ==
Al-Qahtani started his career at the youth teams of Al-Hilal at 12 years old. He signed his first professional contract with the club on 13 October 2020. He made his debut on 20 December 2021 in the King Cup match against Al-Raed. Al-Qahtani made his league debut on 25 December 2021 in the 3–2 loss to Al-Fateh. On 10 January 2026, Al-Qahtani joined Al-Taawoun on a six-month loan.

== International career ==
In June 2023, he took part in the Maurice Revello Tournament in France with Saudi Arabia.

== Career statistics ==
=== Club ===
As of 31 May 2024.

Club	Season	League			Cup		Continental		Other		Total	
Club	Season	Division	Apps	Goals	Apps	Goals	Apps	Goals	Apps	Goals	Apps	Goals
Al-Hilal	2021–22	SPL	1	0	1	0	0	0	0	0	2	0
Al-Hilal	2022–23	SPL	6	3	0	0	0	0	0	0	6	3
Al-Hilal	2023–24	SPL	8	1	1	0	4	0	1 (Note: Appearances in Arab Club Champions Cup)	0	14	1
Al-Hilal	Total		15	4	2	0	4	0	1	0	22	4
Career total			15	4	2	0	4	0	1	0	22	4

== Honours ==
Al-Hilal

- Saudi Pro League: 2021–22, 2023–24
- Kings Cup: 2022–23, 2023–24
- Saudi Super Cup: 2023, 2024
- AFC Champions League: 2021

Saudi Arabia U23

- WAFF U-23 Championship: 2022
