= 2016 Qatar Cup =

Tournament details
- Country: Qatar
- Dates: April 24 – April 29
- Teams: 4

Final positions
- Champions: El Jaish (2nd title)
- Runners-up: Lekhwiya

Tournament statistics
- Matches played: 3
- Goals scored: 12 (4 per match)
- Top goal scorer: (Morocco) Abderrazak Hamdallah (2 goals)

The 2016 Qatar Cup, more widely known as the Crown Prince Cup is the twenty-second in the series, taking place from April 24 till the 29 April. The cup is contested by the top four finishers in 2015–16 Qatar Stars League.

== 2016 Participants ==
- Al-Rayyan : 2015–16 Qatar Stars League champions
- El Jaish : 2015–16 Qatar Stars League runners up
- Al-Sadd : 2015–16 Qatar Stars League third place
- Lekhwiya : 2015–16 Qatar Stars League 4th place

== Bracket ==
Semi-finals
2016-04-24 - Doha
(Qatar) Al-Rayyan	1
(Qatar) Lekhwiya	3
2016-04-25 - Doha
(Qatar) El Jaish	3
(Qatar) Al-Sadd	2

Final
2016-04-29 - Doha
(Qatar) Lekhwiya	1
(Qatar) El Jaish	2

== Match details ==
=== Semi-finals ===
24 April 2016

Al-Rayyan	1 – 3	Lekhwiya
Cáceres 87'		Msakni 50'; Muntari 57'; Nam Tae-hee 75'

Jassim Bin Hamad Stadium, Doha
25 April 2016

El Jaish	3 – 2	Al-Sadd
Al-Haydos 33' (o.g.); Romarinho 55'; Hamdallah 72' (pen.)		Khalifa Ababacar 36' (o.g.); Pouraliganji 88'

Jassim Bin Hamad Stadium, Doha

=== Final ===
29 April 2016

Lekhwiya	1 – 2	El Jaish
Kaluyituka 79' (pen.)		Mothnani 30'; Hamdallah 90' (pen.)

Jassim Bin Hamad Stadium, Doha
Referee: Abdul Rahman Al-Jassim
