= 2023 Saudi Super Cup =

Tournament details
- Host country: United Arab Emirates
- City: Abu Dhabi
- Dates: 8 – 11 April 2024
- Teams: 4

Final positions
- Champions: Al-Hilal (4th title)
- Runners-up: Al-Ittihad

Tournament statistics
- Matches played: 3
- Goals scored: 11 (3.67 per match)
- Attendance: 70,250 (23,417 per match)
- Top scorer(s): Malcom (3 goals)
- Best player: Malcom (Al-Hilal)

The 2023 Saudi Super Cup (also known as The Diriyah Saudi Super Cup for sponsorship reasons) was the 10th edition of the Saudi Super Cup, an annual football competition for clubs in the Saudi Arabian football league system that were successful in its major competitions in the preceding season.

On 5 April 2024, the Saudi Arabian Football Federation (SAFF) and the Diriyah Company signed a sponsorship deal for the 2023 edition. The match would officially be referred to as "The Diriyah Saudi Super Cup".

Al-Hilal defeated Al-Ittihad 4–1 in the final to win their record-extending fourth title.

== Qualification ==
The tournament featured the winners and runners-up of the 2022–23 King's Cup and 2022–23 Saudi Pro League.

=== Qualified teams ===
The following four teams qualified for the tournament.

Team	Method of qualification	Appearance	Last appearance as	Years performance		
Team	Method of qualification	Appearance	Last appearance as	Winner(s)	Runners-up	Semi-finalists
Al-Ittihad	2022–23 Saudi Pro League winners	4th	2022 winners	1	2	–
Al-Hilal	2022–23 King's Cup winners	7th	2022 semi-finalists	3	2	1
Al-Nassr	2022–23 Saudi Pro League runners-up	6th	2022 semi-finalists	2	2	1
Al-Wehda	2022–23 King's Cup runners-up	1st	0 (debut)	–	–	–

== Venue ==
The 2023 Saudi Super Cup was supposed to be held between 27 February and 1 March. However, following the date change for 2023–24 AFC Champions League knockout stage, it was announced that the Super Cup would be postponed to a later date. On 9 March, it was announced that Super Cup would take place in the United Arab Emirates between 8 and 11 April. It was announced that the first semi-final between Al-Ittihad and Al-Wehda would take place at the Al Nahyan Stadium while the second semi-final between Al-Hilal and Al-Nassr as well as the final would take place at the Mohammed bin Zayed Stadium.

2023 Saudi Super Cup is located in United Arab Emirates	Abu Dhabi	
2023 Saudi Super Cup is located in United Arab Emirates	Mohammed bin Zayed Stadium	Al Nahyan Stadium
2023 Saudi Super Cup is located in United Arab Emirates	Capacity: 36,186	Capacity: 15,894

== Matches ==
- Times listed are UTC+4.

=== Bracket ===
Semi-finals
8 April 2024 – Abu Dhabi (Al Nahyan)
Al-Ittihad	2
Al-Wehda	1
8 April 2024 – Abu Dhabi (MBZ)
Al-Hilal	2
Al-Nassr	1

Final
11 April 2024 – Abu Dhabi (MBZ)
Al-Ittihad	1
Al-Hilal	4

=== Semi-finals ===
8 April 2024
21:00

Al-Ittihad	2–1	Al-Wehda
Benzema 1'; Hamdallah 42'	Report	Al-Eisa 90+7'

Al Nahyan Stadium, Abu Dhabi
Attendance: 9,000
Referee: Faisal Al-Blwi

8 April 2024
23:30

Al-Hilal	2–1	Al-Nassr
S. Al-Dawsari 61'; Malcom 72'	Report	Mané 90+9'

Mohammed bin Zayed Stadium, Abu Dhabi
Attendance: 34,000
Referee: Mohammed Al-Hoaish

=== Final ===
11 April 2024
21:30 UAEST

Al-Ittihad	1–4	Al-Hilal
Hamdallah 21'	Report	Malcom 5', 89'; S. Al-Dawsari 44'; N. Al-Dawsari 90+6'

Mohammed bin Zayed Stadium, Abu Dhabi
Attendance: 27,250
Referee: Khaled Al-Teris
