= 2022 Saudi Super Cup final =

2022 Berain Saudi Super Cup Final
- Event: 2022 Saudi Super Cup
Al-Ittihad	Al-Fayha
2	0
- Date: 29 January 2023
- Venue: King Fahd International Stadium, Riyadh
- Man of the Match: Abderrazak Hamdallah (Al-Ittihad)
- Referee: Fernando Rapallini (Argentina)
- Attendance: 47,518
- Weather: Clear; 16 °C (61 °F); 46% humidity

The 2022 Saudi Super Cup Final (also known as The Berain Saudi Super Cup Final for sponsorship reasons) was the 9th edition of the Saudi Super Cup. This was the first edition of the Saudi Super Cup to feature four teams following its expansion in 2022. The final was played on 29 January 2023 at the King Fahd International Stadium, Riyadh, between Al-Ittihad and Al-Fayha.

Al-Ittihad defeated Al-Fayha 2–0 to win their first title.

== Teams ==
Team	Qualification for tournament	Previous finals appearances (bold indicates winners)
Al-Ittihad	2021–22 Pro League runners-up	2 (2013, 2018)
Al-Fayha	2021–22 King Cup winners	0 (debut)

== Venue ==
The King Fahd International Stadium was announced as the venue of the final on 24 December 2022. This was the third time the King Fahd International Stadium hosted the final and the fifth time it was hosted in Saudi Arabia.

The King Fahd International Stadium was built in 1982 and was opened in 1987. The stadium was used as a venue for the 1992, 1995, and the 1997 editions of the FIFA Confederations Cup. Its current capacity is 68,752 and it is used by the Saudi Arabia national football team, Al-Hilal, Al-Shabab, and major domestic matches.

== Background ==
As part of the running sponsorship deal between the Saudi Arabian Football Federation (SAFF) and Saudi water company Berain, the match will be officially referred to as "The Berain Saudi Super Cup".

This was Al-Ittihad's third appearance in the final. Al-Ittihad lost both of their previous finals. In 2013 they lost to Al-Fateh and in 2018 they lost to Al-Hilal. Al-Ittihad qualified by defeating Al-Nassr 3–1 in the semi-finals.

Al-Fayha made their first-ever finals appearance. Al-Fayha qualified after defeating Pro League champions Al-Hilal 1–0 in the semi-finals.

This was the first meeting between these two sides in the Saudi Super Cup and the first-ever meeting between them in a cup final. This was the 12th competitive meeting between the two with the first meeting dating back to 15 September 2014. Al-Ittihad won 6 times while Al-Fayha won 5 times. The two teams met once in the 2022–23 season with Al-Ittihad defeating Al-Fayha 3–0 at home.

== Match ==
=== Details ===
29 January 2023
20:00 AST

Al-Ittihad	2–0	Al-Fayha
Hamdallah 3', 48'	Report

King Fahd International Stadium, Riyadh
Attendance: 47,518
Referee: Fernando Rapallini (Argentina)

**Al-Ittihad**	**Al-Fayha**

GK	34	(Brazil) Marcelo Grohe
RB	13	(Saudi Arabia) Muhannad Al-Shanqeeti		(substituted off) 90+2'
CB	20	(Saudi Arabia) Ahmed Sharahili
CB	26	(Egypt) Ahmed Hegazi (c)
LB	12	(Saudi Arabia) Zakaria Hawsawi		(substituted off) 90+2'
DM	3	(Egypt) Tarek Hamed
DM	19	(Brazil) Bruno Henrique
RW	24	(Saudi Arabia) Abdulrahman Al-Aboud		(substituted off) 61'
AM	10	(Brazil) Igor Coronado	(yellow card) 30'	(substituted off) 90+2'
LW	90	(Brazil) Romarinho		(substituted off) 77'
CF	9	(Morocco) Abderrazak Hamdallah
Substitutes:
GK	21	(Saudi Arabia) Abdullah Al-Jadaani
DF	5	(Saudi Arabia) Omar Hawsawi
DF	27	(Saudi Arabia) Hamdan Al-Shamrani		(substituted on) 90+2'
DF	33	(Saudi Arabia) Madallah Al-Olayan		(substituted on) 90+2'
DF	95	(Saudi Arabia) Ahmed Bamsaud
MF	11	(Saudi Arabia) Abdulaziz Al-Bishi		(substituted on) 77'
MF	14	(Saudi Arabia) Awad Al-Nashri		(substituted on) 90+2'
FW	70	(Saudi Arabia) Haroune Camara		(substituted on) 61'
FW	80	(Saudi Arabia) Mohammed Al-Saiari
Manager:
(Portugal) Nuno Espírito Santo

GK	88	(Serbia) Vladimir Stojković
CB	22	(Saudi Arabia) Mohammed Al-Baqawi
CB	4	(Saudi Arabia) Sami Al-Khaibari (c)
CB	3	(Saudi Arabia) Bander Nasser		(substituted off) 83'
RM	26	(Saudi Arabia) Ali Al-Zaqaan		(substituted off) 46'
CM	8	(Saudi Arabia) Abdulrahman Al-Safri	(red card) 24'
CM	37	(Brazil) Ricardo Ryller
LM	18	(Brazil) Paulinho
RW	27	(Saudi Arabia) Sultan Mandash		(substituted off) 62'
CF	23	(Serbia) Milan Pavkov		(substituted off) 55'
LW	10	(Spain) Víctor Ruiz		(substituted off) 55'
Substitutes:
GK	1	(Saudi Arabia) Moslem Al Freej
DF	2	(Saudi Arabia) Mukhair Al-Rashidi
DF	17	(Saudi Arabia) Abdullah Al-Shamekh		(substituted on) 83'
DF	80	(Saudi Arabia) Osama Al-Khalaf		(substituted on) 46'
DF	98	(Saudi Arabia) Muhannad Al-Qaydhi		(substituted on) 62'
MF	6	(Saudi Arabia) Saud Zidan		(substituted on) 55'
MF	7	(North Macedonia) Aleksandar Trajkovski
MF	16	(Saudi Arabia) Ali Al-Nemer
FW	19	(Saudi Arabia) Mohammed Majrashi		(substituted on) 55'
Manager:
(Serbia) Vuk Rašović

Man of the Match:
Abderrazak Hamdallah (Al-Ittihad)

Assistant referees:
Juan Pablo Belatti (Argentina)
Diego Bonfá (Argentina)
Fourth official:
Khaled Al-Teris
Video assistant referee:
Mauro Vigliano (Argentina)
Assistant video assistant referees:
Mohammed Al-Abkari

**Match rules**

- 90 minutes
- Penalty shoot-out if scores still level
- Nine named substitutes
- Maximum of five substitutions

=== Statistics ===
First half
Statistic	Al-Ittihad	Al-Fayha
Goals scored	1	0
Total shots	4	2
Shots on target	3	2
Saves	2	2
Ball possession	60%	40%
Corner kicks	2	1
Fouls committed	6	9
Offsides	1	0
Yellow cards	1	0
Red cards	0	1

Second half
Statistic	Al-Ittihad	Al-Fayha
Goals scored	1	0
Total shots	1	1
Shots on target	1	0
Saves	0	0
Ball possession	70%	30%
Corner kicks	0	3
Fouls committed	5	10
Offsides	2	0
Yellow cards	0	0
Red cards	0	0

Overall
Statistic	Al-Ittihad	Al-Fayha
Goals scored	2	0
Total shots	5	3
Shots on target	4	2
Saves	2	2
Ball possession	65%	35%
Corner kicks	2	4
Fouls committed	11	19
Offsides	3	0
Yellow cards	1	0
Red cards	0	1

== See also ==
- 2021–22 Saudi Pro League
- 2021–22 King Cup
