= Nasser Al-Dawsari =

Saudi Arabian footballer (born 1998)

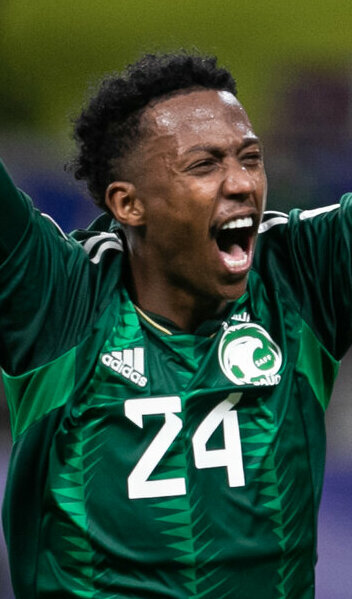
- Al-Dawsari with Saudi Arabia at the 2023 AFC Asian Cup

Personal information
- Full name: Nasser Essa Shafi Al-Shardan Al-Dawsari
- Date of birth: 19 December 1998 (age 27)
- Place of birth: Riyadh, Saudi Arabia
- Height: 1.78 m (5 ft 10 in)
- Positions: Left-back; midfielder

Team information
- Current team: Al Hilal
- Number: 6

Youth career
- 2011-2017: Al Hilal

Senior career*
Years	Team	Apps	(Gls)
2017–	Al Hilal	171	(4)

International career^{‡}
2016–2018	Saudi Arabia U20	2	(0)
2019–2021	Saudi Arabia U23		
2021–	Saudi Arabia	57	(1)
- * Club domestic league appearances and goals as of 31 October 2026 ‡ National team caps and goals as of 17 November 2026

Nasser Essa Shafi Al-Shardan Al-Dawsari (Arabic: ناصر عيسى الدوسري; born 19 December 1998) is a Saudi Arabian professional footballer who plays as a left-back, defensive-midfielder or central-midfielder for Saudi Pro League club Al Hilal and the Saudi Arabia national team.

== Club career ==
Al-Dawsari started his career at Al Hilal in 2011 at the age of 13. On 23 November 2021, Al-Dawsari scored the fastest goal ever in the AFC Champions League, just 16 seconds into the game, propelling his side to a 2–0 victory over Pohang Steelers to secure a record fourth continental title for Al Hilal.

== International Career ==
On 31 May 2026, he was named in the 26-man squad for the 2026 FIFA World Cup.

== Career statistics ==
=== Club ===
As of 4 July 2024

Appearances and goals by club, season and competition
Club	Season	League			King's Cup		Continental		Other		Total	
Club	Season	Division	Apps	Goals	Apps	Goals	Apps	Goals	Apps	Goals	Apps	Goals
Al Hilal	2017–18	Saudi Pro League	3	0	1	0	1 (Note: Appearances in AFC Champions League)	0	3 (Note: Appearances in Arab Club Champions Cup)	1	8	1
Al Hilal	2018–19	Saudi Pro League	13	0	5	1	2	0	8 (Note: Seven appearances in Arab Club Champions Cup, and one appearance in Saudi Super Cup)	0	28	1
Al Hilal	2019–20	Saudi Pro League	9	0	3	0	6	0	0	0	18	0
Al Hilal	2020–21	Saudi Pro League	16	1	0	0	5	0	1 (Note: Appearances in Saudi Super Cup)	0	22	1
Al Hilal	2021–22	Saudi Pro League	14	0	1	0	9	2	0	0	24	2
Al Hilal	2022–23	Saudi Pro League	22	0	2	0	3	0	4 (Note: One appearance in Saudi Super Cup, and three appearances in FIFA Club World Cup)	0	31	0
Al Hilal	2023–24	Saudi Pro League	25	1	4	0	6	0	5 (Note: Four appearances in Arab Club Champions Cup, and one appearance and one goal in Saudi Super Cup)	1	40	2
Al Hilal	2024–25	Saudi Pro League	31	1	3	0	11	3	7 (Note: Two appearances in Saudi Super Cup, five appearances in FIFA Club World Cup)	0	52	4
Career total			133	3	19	1	43	5	28	2	223	11

=== International ===
As of match played 17 November 2026

Appearances and goals by national team and year
National team	Year	Apps	Goals
Saudi Arabia
Saudi Arabia	2021	4	0
Saudi Arabia	2022	7	0
Saudi Arabia	2023	5	0
Saudi Arabia	2024	15	1
Saudi Arabia	2025	13	0
Saudi Arabia	2026	13	0
Total		57	1

Scores and results list Saudi Arabia's goal tally first, score column indicates score after each Al-Dawsari goal.

List of international goals scored by Nasser Al-Dawsari
No.	Date	Venue	Opponent	Score	Result	Competition
1	17 December 2024	Al-Shabab Club Stadium, Riyadh, Saudi Arabia	Trinidad and Tobago	3–0	3–1	Friendly

== Honours ==
Al Hilal

- Saudi Professional League: 2017–18, 2019–20, 2020–21, 2021–22, 2023–24
- King Cup: 2019–20, 2022–23, 2023–24
- Saudi Super Cup: 2018, 2021, 2023, 2024
- AFC Champions League: 2019, 2021

Records

- Fastest goal in the AFC Champions League Final: 2021 (16 seconds in against Pohang Steelers)
