= 2022 Saudi Super Cup =

Tournament details
- Host country: Saudi Arabia
- City: Riyadh
- Dates: 26 – 29 January 2023
- Teams: 4

Final positions
- Champions: Al-Ittihad (1st title)
- Runners-up: Al-Fayha

Tournament statistics
- Matches played: 3
- Goals scored: 7 (2.33 per match)
- Attendance: 106,015 (35,338 per match)
- Top scorer(s): Abderrazak Hamdallah (3 goals)
- Best player: Abderrazak Hamdallah (Al-Ittihad)

The 2022 Saudi Super Cup (also known as The Berain Saudi Super Cup for sponsorship reasons) was the 9th edition of the Saudi Super Cup, an annual football competition for clubs in the Saudi Arabia football league system that were successful in its major competitions in the preceding season.

On 19 February 2022, it was announced that the competition would be changed from a two-team format to four teams, which would include a semi-final round. The winners and runners-up of the Saudi Pro League and the King Cup would take part in the competition. The semi-final round was played on 26 January 2023, and the final was held on 29 January.

Al-Ittihad defeated Al-Fayha 2–0 in the final to win their first title.

== Qualification ==
The tournament was supposed to feature the winners and runners-up of the 2021–22 King Cup and 2021–22 Saudi Professional League. However, since Al-Hilal were Pro League winners and King Cup runners-up, the extra spot was awarded to the Pro League third-placed team Al-Nassr.

=== Qualified teams ===
The following four teams qualified for the tournament.

Team	Method of qualification	Appearance	Last appearance as	Years performance	
Team	Method of qualification	Appearance	Last appearance as	Winner(s)	Runners-up
Al-Hilal	2021–22 Saudi Professional League winners and 2021–22 King Cup runners-up	6th	2021 winners	3	2
Al-Fayha	2021–22 King Cup winners	1st	0 (debut)	–	–
Al-Ittihad	2021–22 Saudi Professional League runners-up	3rd	2018 runners-up	–	2
Al-Nassr	2021–22 Saudi Professional League third place	5th	2020 winners	2	2

== Draw ==
The draw was held on 24 December at the SSC headquarters in Riyadh. There was no restriction in it.

== Matches ==
- Times listed are UTC+3.

=== Bracket ===
Semi-finals
26 January 2023 – Riyadh (Al-Durra)
Al-Ittihad	3
Al-Nassr	1
26 January 2023 – Riyadh (Al-Malaz)
Al-Fayha	1
Al-Hilal	0

Final
29 January 2023 – Riyadh (Al-Durra)
Al-Ittihad	2
Al-Fayha	0

=== Semi-finals ===
26 January 2023
18:00

Al-Fayha	1–0	Al-Hilal
Paulinho 20'	Report

Prince Faisal bin Fahd Stadium, Riyadh
Attendance: 9,020
Referee: Szymon Marciniak (Poland)

26 January 2023
21:00

Al-Ittihad	3–1	Al-Nassr
Romarinho 15'; Hamdallah 43'; Al-Shanqeeti 90+3'	Report	Talisca 67'

King Fahd International Stadium, Riyadh
Attendance: 49,477
Referee: Danny Makkelie (Netherlands)

=== Final ===
29 January 2023
20:00 AST

Al-Ittihad	2–0	Al-Fayha
Hamdallah 3', 48'	Report

King Fahd International Stadium, Riyadh
Attendance: 47,518
Referee: Fernando Rapallini (Argentina)
