= Abderrazak Hamdallah =

Moroccan footballer (born 1990)

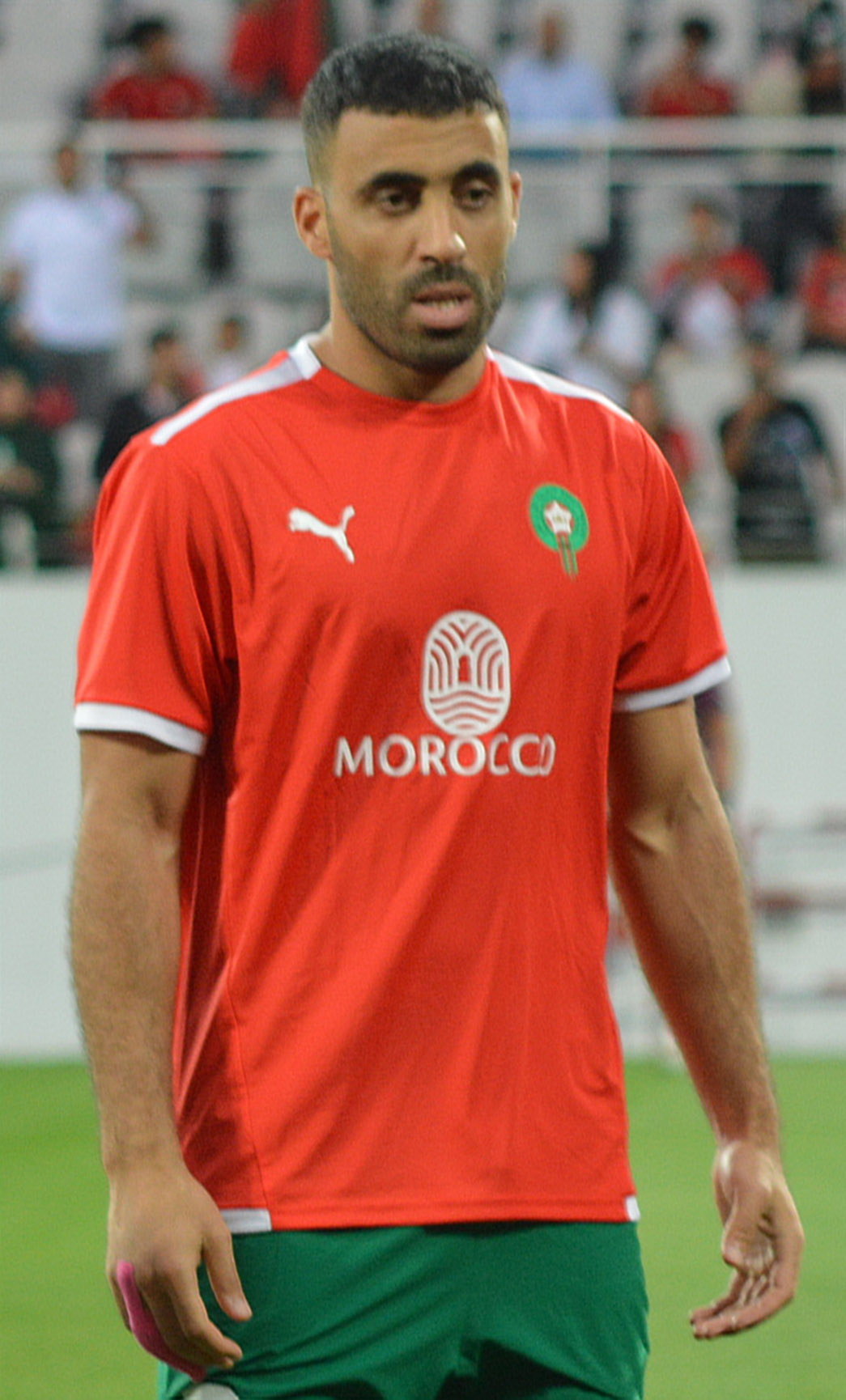
- Hamdallah with Morocco in 2023

Personal information
- Full name: Abderrazak Hamdallah
- Date of birth: 17 December 1990 (age 35)
- Place of birth: Safi, Morocco
- Height: 1.82 m (6 ft 0 in)
- Position: Striker

Team information
- Current team: Al-Taawoun
- Number: 9

Senior career*
Years	Team	Apps	(Gls)
2010–2013	Olympic Safi	55	(30)
2013–2014	Aalesund	27	(15)
2014–2015	Guangzhou R&F	32	(25)
2015–2017	El-Jaish	23	(21)
2017–2018	Al-Rayyan	20	(18)
2018–2021	Al-Nassr	74	(77)
2021–2024	Al-Ittihad	63	(52)
2024–2026	Al-Shabab	40	(27)
2025	→ Al-Hilal (loan)	0	(0)
2026–	Al-Taawoun	10	(4)

International career^{‡}
2009–2011	Morocco U23	16	(8)
2012–2025	Morocco	29	(10)
Medal record
Men's football
Representing Morocco
FIFA Arab Cup
Winner	2025 Qatar	Team
- * Club domestic league appearances and goals as of 31 October 2026 (UTC) ‡ National team caps and goals as of 18 December 2025 (UTC)

Abderrazak Hamdallah (Arabic: عَبْد الرَّزَّاق حَمَد الله; born 17 December 1990) is a Moroccan professional footballer who plays as a striker for Saudi Pro League club Al-Taawoun. He is nicknamed The Executioner for his goal scoring ability.

He started his professional career playing for Olympic Club de Safi in Morocco, later transferring to Aalesunds in Norway. After one season with them, he joined Chinese club Guangzhou R&F. In 2015, he transferred to El Jaish, where he won the 2016 Qatar Cup. He later joined Al-Rayyan in 2017, Al-Nassr in 2018, Al-Ittihad in 2021, and Al-Shabab in 2024.

Hamdallah has won two Saudi Pro League titles, three Saudi Super Cups and finished as the top-scorer of the league three times. In the 2018–19 Saudi Pro League season, he scored 34 goals with a record in the 2019 King's Cup, 14 goals in just five matches, and was the world's leading goalscorer during the 2019 calendar year with 57 goals overall without playing with the national team.

A Moroccan international since 2012, Hamdallah represented his country at the 2013 Africa Cup of Nations, 2022 FIFA World Cup and the 2025 FIFA Arab Cup, winning the final tournament before retiring the day after the final.

== Early life ==
Born in Safi, Morocco, Hamdallah was the youngest of seven children of the family. Hamadallah spoke about his childhood, stating:

I started playing football in the street with other children of the city where I was born, Safi. As a teenager, I enrolled in a club in town. I was playing almost every day after school and all weekend. My older brother always supported me. He encouraged me to work hard.

== Club career ==
=== Olympic Safi ===
Hamdallah received his initial football formation at Nejm Shabab Safi club, before moving to the first team, Olympic Club de Safi, where his professional career began since the 2010–11 Botola, during which he played his first match in the Moroccan championship. He managed to score his first goal for the team against Difaâ Hassani El Jadidi. Hamdallah scored twice for Olympic Club de Safi in his first appearance in the Moroccan Throne Cup against Raja CA, the match ended in a 3–2 victory. The 2011–12 Botola marked the real start of Hamdallah at the scoring level, as he finished the season by scoring 15 goals, occupying the second row, two goals ahead of the Chadian new striker Karl Max Barthélémy. In the 2012–13 season, Hamdallah scored 15 goals in the first two-thirds of the tournament before joining, during March 2013, to professionally with the Norwegian club Ålesund. He scored his first hat-trick for the team against Wydad de Fès. The financial value of Hamdallah's transfer to Olesund Club amounted to one million US dollars.

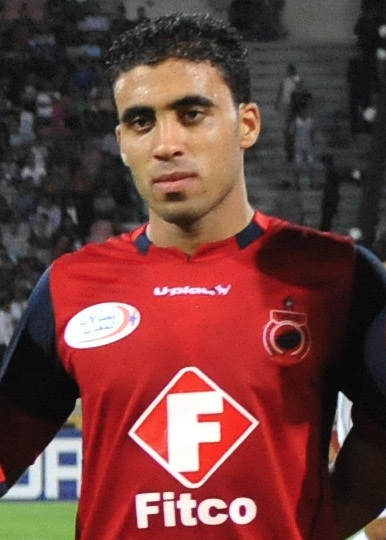
Hamdallah with Olympic Safi in 2011

=== Aalesund ===
On 14 February 2013, it was confirmed that Hamdallah had joined Tippeliga club Aalesund. The transfer fee was in the region of €1 million or 7.4 million Norwegian Krone and the player signed a three-year contract, his first European contract. The transfer fee was the highest Aalesund has paid for a player ever.

Hamdallah spoke about the first time he arrived at Norway, stating: "It was a difficult experience because I arrived in a country that's very cold, but through an effort of will, I overcame every obstacle. I was the first player from the Moroccan championship to come to Norway, and my signing generated a lot of attention in the newspapers. In the end, I was able to silence my critics by finishing as one of the leading scorers in the league."

Hamdallah made his debut on 1 April 2013 as a substitute in the 1–0 away win of Sandnes Ulf and then scored his first goal for the club, in a 2–0 win over Sarpsborg 08 on 14 April 2013. Then on 13 May 2013, Hamdallah scored his first hat-trick for Aalesund in a 7–1 win over Lillestrøm SK, which he helped the club into second place after nine games. After scoring ten goals so far this season, Hamadallah scored his second hat-trick of the season, in a 3–1 win over Viking on 25 October 2013. In his first season with the club, Hamdallah scored 15 times in 27 appearances and was included in the Team of the Year. Also, it left Hamdallah as the club's top scorer, though he was the second in the league behind Frode Johnsen.

=== Guangzhou R&F ===
In February 2014, Hamdallah joined Chinese Super League side Guangzhou R&F. Upon the move, Hamdallah will be coached by Sven-Göran Eriksson for a record fee of €4.5 million or 33,3 million Norwegian Krone. His departure from Aalesund left the club very affected, due to his goal-scoring form, something the club struggled with after Hamdallah left Norway for China.

After making two appearances at the start of the season, Hamdallah scored his first hat-trick of the season, in a 3–1 win over Shanghai Shenxin on 22 March 2014. In the next game against Hangzhou Greentown, he scored another hat-trick in a 6–2 win. He scored again in the next match against Henan Jianye, which he scored twice in a 4–0 win. After a week out over a leg injury, Hamdallah scored the winning goal, in a 1–0 win over against reigning champion, Guangzhou Evergrande. In his first season at Guangzhou R&F, Hamdallah made twenty-two appearances and scoring twenty-two times.

Despite making a good start in the first four matches and scoring three times against Hangzhou Greentown, Shanghai SIPG and Guizhou Renhe. Hamdallah also scored in the group-stage of AFC Champions League match against Gamba Osaka. However, Hamdallah suffered leg injury and then continuously suffered from injuries. Not only that, his attitude caused a stir from manager Cosmin Contra and the pair fell out. It was announced on 3 July 2015 that Hamdallah would leave the club.

=== El Jaish ===
On 24 July 2015, Hamdallah joined El Jaish in the Qatar Stars League on a two-year contract with an option of extending for a third year. As part of the move, Aalesund received 25 percent of the transfer fee paid to Guangzhou. Hamdallah had missed half of the season of 2016 due to a knee injury. His scoring has dropped this season due to absence of half of the games in this season. On 25 April 2016, Hamdallah scored in the semi-final in a 3–2 win against Al Sadd. They defeated Al-Duhail in the final.

=== Al Rayyan ===
On 20 January 2017, Hamdallah signed a contract until 2019 with Al-Rayyan. On 23 August 2018, Hamdallah terminated his contract with Al-Rayyan.

=== Al Nassr ===
On 23 August 2018, Hamdallah joined Al Nassr in the Saudi Professional League. He made his debut against Al Qadsiah and made two assists. In his second match, he scored his first goal for the club against Al Taawoun. By April 2019 he had scored 100 league goals, a record since the league became professional in 2007. Despite the bad start due to a previous ankle injury Hamadallah was able to end his first season in the Saudi Professional League as the top scorer after impressively scoring 68 goals. In the 2018–19 Season he won league title with his team. He scored a record of 34 goals with his teammate Nordin Amrabat. He scored in the final match against Al Batin. On 3 January 2019, Hamdallah scored a hat-trick against Al Jandal in Round of 64 in the 2019 King Cup. 10 days later, he scored a super hat-trick against Al Ansar. He scored another super hat-trick against Al-Fayha in the Round of 16. On 27 April 2019, Hamdallah scored a double in a 4–2 loss in the semi-final against Al Ittihad of the 2019 King Cup. By the end of 2019, Hamdallah managed to beat several stars such as Robert Lewandowski and Lionel Messi as the world's top scorer after reaching 57 goals.

On 4 January 2020, Hamdallah scored in a 1–1 draw against Al Taawoun to win the 2019 Saudi Super Cup. On 30 January 2021, Hamdallah scored in a 3–0 victory against Al Hilal to win the 2020 Saudi Super Cup. In the 2020 AFC Champions League he scored in a 2–2 draw against Al Sadd and scored a double in a 2–0 win against Sepahan. In the quarter finals he scored the only goal in a 1–0 victory against Al Taawoun. They lost in the semi-finals in after a penalty shootout against Persepolis. Hamdallah played his final match for the club in a 1–0 loss against Ettifaq. On 23 November, Al Nassr officially terminated its contract with Hamdallah, With Al-Nassr, he played 115 matches and contributed to 133 goals (109 goals and 24 assists).

=== Al Ittihad ===
On 16 December 2021, Hamdallah joined Al Ittihad in the Saudi Professional League. On 14 January 2022, he scored his first goal for the club in a friendly match against Newcastle United. He scored his first league goal against Al Raed. On 26 February 2022, Hamdallah scored a hattrick in a 4–3 victory over Al Ahli in the Jeddah Derby. Thus becoming the first footballer to score a hattrick in the Jeddah Derby since the league became professional in 2007. On 2 August 2022, Hamdallah was suspended for by the Saudi football committee for four months with an 80 thousand dollar fine after a complaint by his former club. On 7 September the suspension has been uplifted making Hamdallah eligible to play the upcoming games.

On 22 December 2022, Hamdallah scored a goal in a 1–1 draw against Al Shabab FC in the 2022–23 King Cup Round of 16, Thus becoming the All-time top scorer of the King Cup with a total of 22 goals. On 4 February 2023, Hamdallah extended his contract with Al-Ittihad until 2025. On 18 March 2023, Hamdallah scored a hat-trick in a 5–1 win against Al Fateh, thus making him the player with the most hat-tricks in the Saudi Professional League with a total of 9 hat-tricks. On 23 October 2023, Hamdallah rescued his club to secure the 3 points scoring a stoppage time winner during the 2023–24 AFC Champions League match against Iraqi club, Al-Quwa Al-Jawiya. On 27 November 2023, Hamdallah scored a double against AGMK, to send Al Ittihad to the last 16 of 2023 AFC Champions League.

=== Al Shabab ===
On 23 July 2024, Hamdallah joined Al Shabab in the Saudi Pro League. In his debut season with the club, he finished as their top scorer with 21 goals, bringing his total tally in the Pro League to 150 goals.

==== Al Hilal (loan) ====
On 2 July 2025, Saudi club Al Hilal SFC announced the loan signing of Hamdallah from Al Shabab, on a deal valid only for the 2025 FIFA Club World Cup, to reinforce their attack amid injuries to key players like Aleksandar Mitrović and Salem Al-Dawsari, with Hamdallah joining the squad immediately for the tournament. He featured as a substitute in the quarter-finals against Fluminense which ended in a 2–1 defeat.

==== Return to Al Shabab ====
On 17 February 2026, Hamdallah scored six goals and provided one assist in a 13–0 thrashing of Al-Tadamun in the GCC Champions League. With this performance, he became the foreign player with the most goal contributions for Saudi clubs in international competitions (38), breaking the previous record held by Marcelo Camacho, and bringing his total contributions to 40 with the team (33 goals and 7 assists).

=== Al-Taawoun ===
In June 2026, Hamdallah signed a one-year deal with Al-Taawoun. Two months later, on 19 August, he scored his first goal for the club from a penalty in a 3–0 away victory over Damac in the King's Cup.

== International career ==
On 22 December 2009, Hamdallah was called up to the Morocco national under-23 team for a week long training camp. On 13 December 2010, Hamdallah scored a goal against Libya's Under-23 team in the first game for Morocco in the 2010 UNAF U-23 Tournament, as Morocco went on to win the game 4–0. On 18 December 2010, Hamdallah scored in a 2–1 victory against Cameroon's Under-23 team.

On 29 February 2012, Hamdallah made his senior international debut for the Morocco national team in a 2–0 friendly win over Burkina Faso. On 9 June 2013, he scored his first goal for Morocco in a 3–0 friendly win over Niger. He announced his retirement from international duty in November 2019.

On 14 February 2022, Hamdallah announced his readiness to carry the Moroccan national team shirt without any conditions. On 6 November 2022, Hamdallah apologized to the Moroccan public for his behavior that got him terminated from representing the national team. Four days later, he was named in Morocco's 26-man squad for the 2022 FIFA World Cup in Qatar.

At the 2025 FIFA Arab Cup, Hamdallah scored once and provided an assist in a 3–0 semi-final victory over the United Arab Emirates. On 18 December 2025, he netted a late equalizer and the extra-time winner in the final against Jordan, securing a 3–2 triumph. He subsequently announced his retirement from international football after the tournament.

== Style of play ==
Hamdallah is described as an "unstoppable phenomenon", and is considered a prolific goalscorer. He is a technical player, with excellent movement, heading technique, and deadly last touches. Hamdallah can score with both feet, and also capable of providing assists due to his vision. He has been criticized of his pace though. He is nicknamed "the Executioner" for his goalscoring ability.

== Personal life ==
Hamadallah is a practicing Muslim, and has been seen many times doing Umrah. On 6 February 2022, Hamdallah built a house for Rayan's parents after the death of Rayan Aourram and asked all the celebrities to donate. On 25 October 2022, Fahd Barbaa, Hamdallah's lawyer, announced that his client had won his case against his former club Al Nassr FC, which was before the International Football Association Board. On 9 September 2023, Hamdallah along with his national teammates donated their blood for the needy affected by the 2023 Marrakesh-Safi earthquake.

== Career statistics ==
=== Club ===
As of match played 4 November 2026

Appearances and goals by club, season and competition
Club	Season	League			National cup (Note: Includes Moroccan Throne Cup, Norwegian Cup, Chinese FA Cup, Emir of Qatar Cup, King's Cup)		Continental		Other		Total	
Club	Season	Division	Apps	Goals	Apps	Goals	Apps	Goals	Apps	Goals	Apps	Goals
Olympic Safi	2010–11	Botola	9	0	1	0	–		–		10	0
Olympic Safi	2011–12	Botola	28	15	2	0	–		–		30	15
Olympic Safi	2012–13	Botola	18	15	3	2	–		–		21	17
Olympic Safi	Total		55	30	6	2	–		–		61	32
Aalesund	2013	Tippeligaen	27	15	3	4	–		–		30	19
Guangzhou R&F	2014	Chinese Super League	22	22	1	0	–		–		23	22
Guangzhou R&F	2015	Chinese Super League	10	3	0	0	6 (Note: Appearances in AFC Champions League)	1	–		16	4
Guangzhou R&F	Total		32	25	1	0	6	1	–		39	26
El Jaish	2015–16	Qatar Stars League	23	21	3	3	8	5	–		34	29
El Jaish	2016–17	Qatar Stars League	0	0	2	1	–		–		2	1
El Jaish	Total		23	21	5	4	8	5	–		36	30
Al-Rayyan	2017–18	Qatar Stars League	20	18	5	7	5	3	–		30	28
Al-Nassr	2018–19	Saudi Pro League	26	34	5	14	5	4	–		36	52
Al-Nassr	2019–20	Saudi Pro League	27	29	5	5	7	7	1 (Note: Appearance in Saudi Super Cup)	1	40	42
Al-Nassr	2020–21	Saudi Pro League	21	14	3	1	8	5	1	1	33	21
Al-Nassr	Total		74	77	13	20	20	16	2	2	109	115
Al-Ittihad	2021–22	Saudi Pro League	13	12	2	1	–		–		15	13
Al-Ittihad	2022–23	Saudi Pro League	26	21	3	1	–		2	3	31	25
Al-Ittihad	2023–24	Saudi Pro League	24	19	3	4	8	4	6 (Note: Three appearances and one goal in Arab Club Champions Cup, one appearance in FIFA Club World Cup, two appearances and two goals in Saudi Super Cup)	3	41	30
Al-Ittihad	Total		63	52	8	6	8	4	8	6	87	68
Al-Shabab	2024–25	Saudi Pro League	26	21	4	3	–		–		30	24
Al-Shabab	2025–26	Saudi Pro League	14	6	1	1	–		5 (Note: Appearances in AGCFF Gulf Club Champions League)	7	20	14
Al-Shabab	Total		40	27	5	4	–		5	7	50	38
Al Hilal (loan)	2024–25	Saudi Pro League	–		–		–		1 (Note: Appearance in FIFA Club World Cup)	0	1	0
Al-Taawoun	2026–27	Saudi Pro League	10	4	1	1	1	2	–		12	7
Career total			344	269	47	48	48	31	16	15	455	363

=== International ===
As of match played 18 December 2025

Appearances and goals by national team and year
National team	Year	Apps	Goals
Morocco	2012	3	1
Morocco	2013	5	1
Morocco	2014	5	5
Morocco	2015	4	0
Morocco	2016	0	0
Morocco	2017	0	0
Morocco	2018	0	0
Morocco	2019	1	0
Morocco	2020	0	0
Morocco	2021	0	0
Morocco	2022	5	0
Morocco	2023	2	0
Morocco	2024	0	0
Morocco	2025	4	3
Total		29	10

Scores and results list Morocco's goal tally first, score column indicates score after each Hamdallah goal.

List of international goals scored by Abderrazak Hamdallah
No.	Date	Venue	Opponent	Score	Result	Competition
1	12 December 2012	Stade de El Jadida, El Jadida, Morocco	Niger	1–0	3–0	Friendly
2	8 June 2013	Stade de Marrakech, Marrakesh, Morocco	Tanzania	1–0	2–1	2014 FIFA World Cup qualification
3	9 October 2014	Stade de Marrakech, Marrakesh, Morocco	Central African Republic	1–0	4–0	Friendly
4	9 October 2014	Stade de Marrakech, Marrakesh, Morocco	Central African Republic	2–0	4–0	Friendly
5	9 October 2014	Stade de Marrakech, Marrakesh, Morocco	Central African Republic	4–0	4–0	Friendly
6	13 November 2014	Stade Adrar, Agadir, Morocco	Benin	2–0	6–1	Friendly
7	13 November 2014	Stade Adrar, Agadir, Morocco	Benin	5–1	6–1	Friendly
8	15 December 2025	Khalifa International Stadium, Al Rayyan, Qatar	United Arab Emirates	3–0	3–0	2025 FIFA Arab Cup
9	18 December 2025	Lusail Stadium, Lusail, Qatar	Jordan	2–2	3–2 (a.e.t.)	2025 FIFA Arab Cup final
10	18 December 2025	Lusail Stadium, Lusail, Qatar	Jordan	3–2	3–2 (a.e.t.)	2025 FIFA Arab Cup final

== Honours ==
El Jaish

- Qatar Cup: 2015–16

Al Rayyan

- Sheikh Jassim Cup: 2018

Al-Nassr

- Saudi Pro League: 2018–19
- Saudi Super Cup: 2019, 2020
- Saudi King's Cup runner-up: 2019–20

Al-Ittihad

- Saudi Pro League: 2022–23
- Saudi Super Cup: 2022

Al-Shabab

- GCC Champions League runner-up: 2025–26

Morocco

- FIFA Arab Cup: 2025

Individual

- Botola Pro Top Scorer: 2012–13
- Aalesund Player of the Year: 2014
- Qatar Stars League Top Scorer: 2015–16 (21 goals)
- Qatar Cup Top Scorer: 2015–16
- Qatari Stars Cup Top Scorer: 2017–18
- Saudi Pro League Player of the Season: 2018–19
- Saudi Pro League Player of the Month: December 2018, March 2019, April 2019, August 2020,February 2022
- King Cup Top Scorer: 2018–19, 2023–24
- Saudi Pro League Golden Boot: 2018–19 (34 goals), 2019–20 (29 goals), 2022–23 (21 goals)
- Saudi Pro League Top Assists: 2018–19
- Al-Nassr Player of the Year: 2019
- Globe Soccer Awards Best Arab Player: 2019
- IFFHS World's Best Top Goal Scorer: 2019 (58 goals)
- AFC Champions League Top Scorer: 2020
- AFC Champions League Team of the Tournament: 2016, 2020
- Saudi Super Cup Player of the tournament: 2022
- Saudi Super Cup Top scorer: 2022
- GCC Champions League Top Scorer: 2025–26

Records

- The historic Top scorer in the Saudi King's Cup: 30 goals
- The historic Top scorer in the Saudi Super Cup: 7 goals
- The fastest player to score 50 goals in the history of the Saudi Pro League
- The fastest player to score a 100 goals in the history of the Saudi Pro League
- The player who scored the most hat-tricks in the history of the Saudi Pro League
- The player who scored the most super hat-tricks in the history of the Saudi Pro League
- 2nd-Most scored player in one season in the Saudi Pro League: 2018–19
- Most scored player in one season in the Saudi King Cup 2019 (14 goals).
- First foreign player in the history of the Saudi Pro League to score more than (20 goals) in one season with two different clubs.
- First foreign player in the history of the Saudi Pro League to score more than (20 goals) in one season with three different clubs.
- First foreign player in the history of the Saudi Pro League to win the Golden Boot with two different clubs.
- The foreign player with the most goal contributions for Saudi clubs in international competitions (40 contributions) with 4 Clubs.
- First player to score a hat-trick in the Jeddah derby
- First player to score in the AFC Champions League with 5 different clubs.
- The player with the longest goal-scoring run in the history of the Saudi Pro League: 14 times
- Most scored player in different clubs in one season in the Saudi Pro League: 14 clubs.
- The player with the most number of hat-tricks in the Saudi Pro League: 11 hat-tricks

Orders

- Order of the Throne: 2022
