= 2025 FIFA Club World Cup knockout stage =

The knockout stage of the 2025 FIFA Club World Cup was the second and final stage of the competition, following the group stage. Played from June 28 to July 13, 2025, the knockout stage began with the round of 16 and culminated with the final, held at MetLife Stadium, East Rutherford, New Jersey in the United States. The top two teams from each group advanced to the knockout stage to compete in a single-elimination tournament.

== Format ==
The knockout stage of the 2025 FIFA Club World Cup was contested between 16 teams that qualified from the group stage. Matches in the knockout stage were played to a finish. If the score of a match was level at the end of 90 minutes of playing time, extra time was played. If, after two periods of 15 minutes, the scores were still tied, the match was decided by a penalty shoot-out. All times listed are local.

== Qualified teams ==
The top two placed teams from each of the eight groups qualified for the knockout stage.

| Group | Winners | Runners-up |
|---|---|---|
| A | (Brazil) Palmeiras | (United States) Inter Miami CF |
| B | (France) Paris Saint-Germain | (Brazil) Botafogo |
| C | (Portugal) Benfica | (Germany) Bayern Munich |
| D | (Brazil) Flamengo | (England) Chelsea |
| E | (Italy) Inter Milan | (Mexico) Monterrey |
| F | (Germany) Borussia Dortmund | (Brazil) Fluminense |
| G | (England) Manchester City | (Italy) Juventus |
| H | (Spain) Real Madrid | (Saudi Arabia) Al Hilal |

== Bracket ==
The tournament bracket is shown below, with bold denoting the winners of each match.

Round of 16
June 30 – Charlotte
(Italy) Inter Milan | 0
**(Brazil) Fluminense** | **2**
June 30 – Orlando
(England) Manchester City | 3
**(Saudi Arabia) Al Hilal (a.e.t.)** | **4**
June 28 – Philadelphia
**(Brazil) Palmeiras (a.e.t.)** | **1**
(Brazil) Botafogo | 0
June 28 – Charlotte
(Portugal) Benfica | 1
**(England) Chelsea (a.e.t.)** | **4**
June 29 – Atlanta
**(France) Paris Saint-Germain** | **4**
(United States) Inter Miami CF | 0
June 29 – Miami Gardens
(Brazil) Flamengo | 2
**(Germany) Bayern Munich** | **4**
July 1 – Miami Gardens
**(Spain) Real Madrid** | **1**
(Italy) Juventus | 0
July 1 – Atlanta
**(Germany) Borussia Dortmund** | **2**
(Mexico) Monterrey | 1

Quarterfinals
July 4 – Orlando
**(Brazil) Fluminense** | **2**
(Saudi Arabia) Al Hilal | 1
July 4 – Philadelphia
(Brazil) Palmeiras | 1
**(England) Chelsea** | **2**
July 5 – Atlanta
**(France) Paris Saint-Germain** | **2**
(Germany) Bayern Munich | 0
July 5 – East Rutherford
**(Spain) Real Madrid** | **3**
(Germany) Borussia Dortmund | 2

Semifinals
July 8 – East Rutherford
(Brazil) Fluminense | 0
**(England) Chelsea** | **2**
July 9 – East Rutherford
**(France) Paris Saint-Germain** | **4**
(Spain) Real Madrid | 0

Final
July 13 – East Rutherford
**(England) Chelsea** | **3**
(France) Paris Saint-Germain | 0

== Round of 16 ==
=== Palmeiras vs Botafogo ===
June 28, 2025
12:00 pm EDT

| Palmeiras (Brazil) | 1–0 (a.e.t.) | (Brazil) Botafogo |
|---|---|---|
| Paulinho 100' | Report |

Lincoln Financial Field, Philadelphia
Attendance: 33,657
Referee: François Letexier (France)

| Palmeiras | Botafogo |

| GK | 21 | (Brazil) Weverton | (yellow card) 120+5' |
| RB | 4 | (Argentina) Agustín Giay |
| CB | 15 | (Paraguay) Gustavo Gómez (c) | (yellow card) 40' (yellow-red card) 116' |
| CB | 3 | (Brazil) Bruno Fuchs |
| LB | 22 | (Uruguay) Joaquín Piquerez | (yellow card) 85' |
| CM | 8 | (Colombia) Richard Ríos |
| CM | 32 | (Uruguay) Emiliano Martínez | | (substituted off) 91' |
| RW | 40 | (Brazil) Allan | | (substituted off) 71' |
| AM | 18 | (Brazil) Maurício | | (substituted off) 85' |
| LW | 41 | (Brazil) Estêvão | (yellow card) 105' | (substituted off) 63' |
| CF | 9 | (Brazil) Vitor Roque | | (substituted off) 63' |
Substitutions:
| FW | 10 | (Brazil) Paulinho | | (substituted on) 63' (substituted off) 103' |
| FW | 31 | (Brazil) Luighi | | (substituted on) 63' |
| DF | 12 | (Brazil) Mayke | | (substituted on) 71' |
| FW | 17 | (Uruguay) Facundo Torres | | (substituted on) 85' |
| MF | 5 | (Argentina) Aníbal Moreno | (yellow card) 120+2' | (substituted on) 91' |
| DF | 13 | (Brazil) Micael | | (substituted on) 103' |
Manager:
(Portugal) Abel Ferreira

| GK | 12 | (Brazil) John |
| RB | 2 | (Brazil) Vitinho |
| CB | 32 | (Brazil) Jair Cunha | | (substituted off) 83' |
| CB | 20 | (Argentina) Alexander Barboza | (yellow card) 3' |
| LB | 13 | (Brazil) Alex Telles | (yellow card) 35' | (substituted off) 66' |
| DM | 5 | (Brazil) Danilo Barbosa | | (substituted off) 83' |
| CM | 25 | (Brazil) Allan | | (substituted off) 66' |
| CM | 17 | (Brazil) Marlon Freitas (c) | | (substituted off) 102' |
| RF | 7 | (Brazil) Artur | (yellow card) 65' |
| CF | 99 | (Brazil) Igor Jesus |
| LF | 10 | (Venezuela) Jefferson Savarino | | (substituted off) 71' |
Substitutions:
| DF | 66 | (Brazil) Cuiabano | | (substituted on) 66' |
| MF | 8 | (Argentina) Álvaro Montoro | (yellow card) 105+3' | (substituted on) 66' |
| FW | 30 | (Argentina) Joaquín Correa | | (substituted on) 71' |
| DF | 31 | (Brazil) Kaio Pantaleão | | (substituted on) 83' |
| MF | 28 | (Brazil) Newton | (yellow card) 90+4' | (substituted on) 83' |
| FW | 98 | (Brazil) Arthur Cabral | | (substituted on) 102' |
Other disciplinary actions:
| DF | 21 | (Brazil) Marçal | (yellow card) 105' |
Manager:
(Portugal) Renato Paiva

Man of the Match:
John (Botafogo)

Assistant referees:
Cyril Mugnier (France)
Mehdi Rahmouni (France)
Fourth official:
Glenn Nyberg (Sweden)
Reserve assistant referee:
Mahbod Beigi (Sweden)
Video assistant referee:
Jérôme Brisard (France)
Assistant video assistant referee:
Bram Van Driessche (Belgium)
Support video assistant referee:
Bastian Dankert (Germany)

=== Benfica vs Chelsea ===
At 5:53 pm EDT, in the 85th minute, the match was interrupted due to adverse weather conditions. The match was resumed at 7:48 pm EDT.

June 28, 2025
4:00 pm EDT

| Benfica (Portugal) | 1–4 (a.e.t.) | (England) Chelsea |
|---|---|---|
| Di María 90+5' (pen.) | Report | James 64'; Nkunku 108'; Neto 114'; Dewsbury-Hall 117' |

Bank of America Stadium, Charlotte
Attendance: 25,929
Referee: Slavko Vinčić (Slovenia)

| Benfica | Chelsea |

| GK | 1 | (Ukraine) Anatoliy Trubin |
| RB | 8 | (Norway) Fredrik Aursnes | | (substituted off) 85' |
| CB | 4 | (Portugal) António Silva | (yellow card) 90+2' |
| CB | 30 | (Argentina) Nicolás Otamendi (c) |
| LB | 26 | (Sweden) Samuel Dahl |
| CM | 61 | (Portugal) Florentino Luís | (yellow card) 62' | (substituted off) 70' |
| CM | 10 | (Turkey) Orkun Kökçü | (yellow card) 82' | (substituted off) 85' |
| RW | 11 | (Argentina) Ángel Di María |
| AM | 18 | (Luxembourg) Leandro Barreiro |
| LW | 21 | (Norway) Andreas Schjelderup | | (substituted off) 46' |
| CF | 14 | (Greece) Vangelis Pavlidis | (yellow card) 50' | (substituted off) 70' |
Substitutions:
| FW | 17 | (Turkey) Kerem Aktürkoğlu | | (substituted on) 46' |
| FW | 19 | (Italy) Andrea Belotti | | (substituted on) 70' |
| FW | 25 | (Argentina) Gianluca Prestianni | (yellow card) 90+6' (yellow-red card) 92' | (substituted on) 70' |
| MF | 68 | (Portugal) João Veloso | | (substituted on) 85' |
| FW | 47 | (Portugal) Tiago Gouveia | (yellow card) 120+1' | (substituted on) 85' |
Manager:
(Portugal) Bruno Lage

| GK | 1 | (Spain) Robert Sánchez |
| CB | 24 | (England) Reece James (c) | | (substituted off) 80' |
| CB | 6 | (England) Levi Colwill | (yellow card) 102' | (substituted off) 118' |
| CB | 5 | (France) Benoît Badiashile | | (substituted off) 70' |
| RM | 8 | (Argentina) Enzo Fernández | | (substituted off) 80' |
| CM | 45 | (Belgium) Roméo Lavia | | (substituted off) 86' |
| CM | 25 | (Ecuador) Moisés Caicedo | (yellow card) 61' |
| LM | 3 | (Spain) Marc Cucurella |
| RF | 7 | (Portugal) Pedro Neto |
| CF | 9 | (England) Liam Delap | | (substituted off) 80' |
| LF | 10 | (England) Cole Palmer | (yellow card) 92' |
Substitutions:
| DF | 4 | (England) Tosin Adarabioyo | | (substituted on) 70' |
| FW | 18 | (France) Christopher Nkunku | | (substituted on) 80' |
| MF | 22 | (England) Kiernan Dewsbury-Hall | | (substituted on) 80' |
| DF | 27 | (France) Malo Gusto | | (substituted on) 80' |
| DF | 23 | (England) Trevoh Chalobah | | (substituted on) 86' |
| DF | 30 | (Argentina) Aarón Anselmino | | (substituted on) 118' |
Manager:
(Italy) Enzo Maresca

Man of the Match:
Moisés Caicedo (Chelsea)

Assistant referees:
Tomaž Klančnik (Slovenia)
Andraž Kovačič (Slovenia)
Fourth official:
Saíd Martínez (Honduras)
Reserve assistant referee:
Walter López (Honduras)
Video assistant referee:
Marco Di Bello (Italy)
Assistant video assistant referee:
Alejandro Hernández Hernández (Spain)
Support video assistant referee:
Tomasz Kwiatkowski (Poland)

=== Paris Saint-Germain vs Inter Miami CF ===
June 29, 2025
12:00 pm EDT

| Paris Saint-Germain (France) | 4–0 | (United States) Inter Miami CF |
|---|---|---|
| Neves 6', 39'; Avilés 44' (o.g.); Hakimi 45+3' | Report |

Mercedes-Benz Stadium, Atlanta
Attendance: 65,574
Referee: Wilton Sampaio (Brazil)

| Paris Saint-Germain | Inter Miami CF |

| GK | 1 | (Italy) Gianluigi Donnarumma |
| RB | 2 | (Morocco) Achraf Hakimi | (substituted off) 69' |
| CB | 5 | (Brazil) Marquinhos (c) | (substituted off) 46' |
| CB | 51 | (Ecuador) Willian Pacho |
| LB | 25 | (Portugal) Nuno Mendes | (substituted off) 69' |
| DM | 17 | (Portugal) Vitinha |
| CM | 87 | (Portugal) João Neves | (substituted off) 61' |
| CM | 8 | (Spain) Fabián Ruiz | (substituted off) 46' |
| RF | 14 | (France) Désiré Doué |
| CF | 29 | (France) Bradley Barcola |
| LF | 7 | (Georgia (country)) Khvicha Kvaratskhelia |
Substitutions:
| MF | 33 | (France) Warren Zaïre-Emery | (substituted on) 46' |
| DF | 4 | (Brazil) Lucas Beraldo | (substituted on) 46' |
| FW | 10 | (France) Ousmane Dembélé | (substituted on) 61' |
| DF | 21 | (France) Lucas Hernandez | (substituted on) 69' |
| MF | 19 | (South Korea) Lee Kang-in | (substituted on) 69' |
Manager:
(Spain) Luis Enrique

| GK | 19 | (Argentina) Oscar Ustari |
| RB | 57 | (Argentina) Marcelo Weigandt | (yellow card) 42' |
| CB | 37 | (Uruguay) Maximiliano Falcón |
| CB | 32 | (Greece) Noah Allen | | (substituted off) 19' |
| LB | 18 | (Spain) Jordi Alba |
| RM | 21 | (Argentina) Tadeo Allende |
| CM | 55 | (Argentina) Federico Redondo |
| CM | 5 | (Spain) Sergio Busquets |
| LM | 8 | (Venezuela) Telasco Segovia | | (substituted off) 75' |
| CF | 10 | (Argentina) Lionel Messi (c) |
| CF | 9 | (Uruguay) Luis Suárez | (yellow card) 74' |
Substitutions:
| DF | 6 | (Argentina) Tomás Avilés | (yellow card) 20' | (substituted on) 19' |
| MF | 30 | (United States) Benjamin Cremaschi | | (substituted on) 75' |
Manager:
(Argentina) Javier Mascherano

Man of the Match:
João Neves (Paris Saint-Germain)

Assistant referees:
Bruno Boschilia (Brazil)
Bruno Pires (Brazil)
Fourth official:
Mustapha Ghorbal (Algeria)
Reserve assistant referee:
Mokrane Gourari (Algeria)
Video assistant referee:
Nicolás Gallo (Colombia)
Assistant video assistant referee:
Leodán González (Uruguay)
Support video assistant referee:
Guillermo Pacheco (Mexico)

=== Flamengo vs Bayern Munich ===
June 29, 2025
4:00 pm EDT

| Flamengo (Brazil) | 2–4 | (Germany) Bayern Munich |
|---|---|---|
| Gerson 33'; Jorginho 55' (pen.) | Report | Pulgar 6' (o.g.); Kane 9', 73'; Goretzka 41' |

Hard Rock Stadium, Miami Gardens
Attendance: 60,914
Referee: Michael Oliver (England)

| Flamengo | Bayern Munich |

| GK | 1 | (Argentina) Agustín Rossi |
| RB | 43 | (Brazil) Wesley França | (yellow card) 63' |
| CB | 3 | (Brazil) Léo Ortiz |
| CB | 4 | (Brazil) Léo Pereira |
| LB | 26 | (Brazil) Alex Sandro | | (substituted off) 81' |
| CM | 5 | (Chile) Erick Pulgar | (yellow card) 42' | (substituted off) 45+1' |
| CM | 21 | (Italy) Jorginho | | (substituted off) 81' |
| RW | 8 | (Brazil) Gerson (c) | | (substituted off) 81' |
| AM | 10 | (Uruguay) Giorgian de Arrascaeta | | (substituted off) 57' |
| LW | 7 | (Brazil) Luiz Araújo |
| CF | 50 | (Ecuador) Gonzalo Plata | (yellow card) 44' |
Substitutions:
| MF | 29 | (Brazil) Allan | (yellow card) 45+3' | (substituted on) 45+1' |
| FW | 27 | (Brazil) Bruno Henrique | | (substituted on) 57' |
| DF | 6 | (Brazil) Ayrton Lucas | | (substituted on) 81' |
| MF | 18 | (Uruguay) Nicolás de la Cruz | | (substituted on) 81' |
| FW | 64 | (Brazil) Wallace Yan | | (substituted on) 81' |
Manager:
(Brazil) Filipe Luís

| GK | 1 | (Germany) Manuel Neuer (c) |
| RB | 27 | (Austria) Konrad Laimer | (yellow card) 90+1' | (substituted off) 90+3' |
| CB | 2 | (France) Dayot Upamecano |
| CB | 4 | (Germany) Jonathan Tah | (yellow card) 44' |
| LB | 44 | (Croatia) Josip Stanišić |
| CM | 6 | (Germany) Joshua Kimmich | (yellow card) 65' |
| CM | 8 | (Germany) Leon Goretzka | | (substituted off) 58' |
| RW | 17 | (France) Michael Olise |
| AM | 7 | (Germany) Serge Gnabry | | (substituted off) 72' |
| LW | 11 | (France) Kingsley Coman | | (substituted off) 58' |
| CF | 9 | (England) Harry Kane | (yellow card) 83' | (substituted off) 90+3' |
Substitutions:
| MF | 45 | (Germany) Aleksandar Pavlović | | (substituted on) 58' |
| FW | 10 | (Germany) Leroy Sané | | (substituted on) 58' |
| MF | 42 | (Germany) Jamal Musiala | (yellow card) 87' | (substituted on) 72' |
| FW | 25 | (Germany) Thomas Müller | | (substituted on) 90+3' |
| DF | 23 | (France) Sacha Boey | | (substituted on) 90+3' |
Manager:
(Belgium) Vincent Kompany

Man of the Match:
Harry Kane (Bayern Munich)

Assistant referees:
Stuart Burt (England)
James Mainwaring (England)
Fourth official:
Cristián Garay (Chile)
Reserve assistant referee:
Miguel Rocha (Chile)
Video assistant referee:
Carlos del Cerro Grande (Spain)
Assistant video assistant referee:
Rob Dieperink (Netherlands)
Support video assistant referee:
Shaun Evans (Australia)

=== Inter Milan vs Fluminense ===
June 30, 2025
3:00 pm EDT

| Inter Milan (Italy) | 0–2 | (Brazil) Fluminense |
|---|---|---|
| | Report | Cano 3'; Hércules 90+3' |

Bank of America Stadium, Charlotte
Attendance: 20,030
Referee: Iván Barton (El Salvador)

| Inter Milan | Fluminense |

| GK | 1 | (Switzerland) Yann Sommer |
| CB | 36 | (Italy) Matteo Darmian |
| CB | 6 | (Netherlands) Stefan de Vrij |
| CB | 95 | (Italy) Alessandro Bastoni | (yellow card) 38' | (substituted off) 71' |
| RM | 2 | (Netherlands) Denzel Dumfries | | (substituted off) 53' |
| CM | 23 | (Italy) Nicolò Barella |
| CM | 21 | (Albania) Kristjan Asllani | (yellow card) 8' | (substituted off) 53' |
| CM | 22 | (Armenia) Henrikh Mkhitaryan | | (substituted off) 53' |
| LM | 32 | (Italy) Federico Dimarco |
| CF | 10 | (Argentina) Lautaro Martínez (c) |
| CF | 9 | (France) Marcus Thuram | | (substituted off) 66' |
Substitutions:
| MF | 8 | (Croatia) Petar Sučić | | (substituted on) 53' |
| FW | 45 | (Argentina) Valentín Carboni | | (substituted on) 53' |
| MF | 11 | (Brazil) Luis Henrique | | (substituted on) 53' |
| FW | 70 | (Italy) Sebastiano Esposito | | (substituted on) 66' |
| DF | 30 | (Brazil) Carlos Augusto | | (substituted on) 71' |
Manager:
(Romania) Cristian Chivu

| GK | 1 | (Brazil) Fábio |
| CB | 4 | (Brazil) Ignácio |
| CB | 3 | (Brazil) Thiago Silva (c) |
| CB | 22 | (Argentina) Juan Pablo Freytes | (yellow card) 26' |
| RWB | 2 | (Brazil) Samuel Xavier |
| LWB | 6 | (Brazil) Renê | (yellow card) 35' |
| CM | 8 | (Brazil) Matheus Martinelli | | (substituted off) 60' |
| CM | 5 | (Uruguay) Facundo Bernal | | (substituted off) 81' |
| CM | 16 | (Brazil) Nonato | | (substituted off) 60' |
| CF | 21 | (Colombia) Jhon Arias |
| CF | 14 | (Argentina) Germán Cano | (yellow card) 16' | (substituted off) 66' |
Substitutions:
| MF | 45 | (Brazil) Lima | | (substituted on) 60' |
| MF | 35 | (Brazil) Hércules | | (substituted on) 60' |
| FW | 9 | (Brazil) Everaldo | | (substituted on) 66' |
| DF | 29 | (Brazil) Thiago Santos | (yellow card) 85' | (substituted on) 81' |
Manager:
| (Brazil) Renato Gaúcho | | | (yellow card) 45+4' |

Man of the Match:
Jhon Arias (Fluminense)

Assistant referees:
David Morán (El Salvador)
Henry Pupiro (El Salvador)
Fourth official:
Tori Penso (United States)
Reserve assistant referee:
Brooke Mayo (United States)
Video assistant referee:
Tatiana Guzmán (Nicaragua)
Assistant video assistant referee:
Erick Miranda (Mexico)
Support video assistant referee:
Mahmoud Ashour (Egypt)

=== Manchester City vs Al Hilal ===
June 30, 2025
9:00 pm EDT

| Manchester City (England) | 3–4 (a.e.t.) | (Saudi Arabia) Al Hilal |
|---|---|---|
| Silva 9'; Haaland 55'; Foden 104' | Report | Marcos Leonardo 46', 112'; Malcom 52'; Koulibaly 94' |

Camping World Stadium, Orlando
Attendance: 42,311
Referee: Jesús Valenzuela (Venezuela)

| Manchester City | Al Hilal |

| GK | 31 | (Brazil) Ederson |
| RB | 27 | (Portugal) Matheus Nunes | (yellow card) 39' | (substituted off) 53' |
| CB | 3 | (Portugal) Rúben Dias |
| CB | 24 | (Croatia) Joško Gvardiol | (yellow card) 27' | (substituted off) 53' |
| LB | 21 | (Algeria) Rayan Aït-Nouri |
| DM | 4 | (Netherlands) Tijjani Reijnders | | (substituted off) 91' |
| CM | 20 | (Portugal) Bernardo Silva (c) |
| CM | 19 | (Germany) İlkay Gündoğan | | (substituted off) 53' |
| RF | 26 | (Brazil) Savinho |
| CF | 9 | (Norway) Erling Haaland | | (substituted off) 91' |
| LF | 11 | (Belgium) Jérémy Doku |
Substitutions:
| MF | 16 | (Spain) Rodri | | (substituted on) 53' (substituted off) 100' |
| DF | 6 | (Netherlands) Nathan Aké | | (substituted on) 53' |
| DF | 25 | (Switzerland) Manuel Akanji | (yellow card) 105+1' | (substituted on) 53' |
| FW | 7 | (Egypt) Omar Marmoush | | (substituted on) 91' |
| MF | 29 | (France) Rayan Cherki | | (substituted on) 91' |
| MF | 47 | (England) Phil Foden | | (substituted on) 100' |
Manager:
(Spain) Pep Guardiola

| GK | 37 | (Morocco) Yassine Bounou |
| CB | 3 | (Senegal) Kalidou Koulibaly |
| CB | 8 | (Portugal) Rúben Neves |
| CB | 6 | (Brazil) Renan Lodi |
| RM | 20 | (Portugal) João Cancelo | | (substituted off) 88' |
| CM | 22 | (Serbia) Sergej Milinković-Savić |
| CM | 28 | (Saudi Arabia) Mohamed Kanno (c) | | (substituted off) 83' |
| CM | 16 | (Saudi Arabia) Nasser Al-Dawsari | | (substituted off) 106' |
| LM | 24 | (Saudi Arabia) Moteb Al-Harbi | | (substituted off) 88' |
| CF | 77 | (Brazil) Malcom | | (substituted off) 64' |
| CF | 11 | (Brazil) Marcos Leonardo | (yellow card) 113' | (substituted off) 116' |
Substitutions:
| MF | 27 | (Brazil) Kaio César | | (substituted on) 64' |
| DF | 78 | (Saudi Arabia) Ali Lajami | | (substituted on) 83' |
| DF | 5 | (Saudi Arabia) Ali Al-Bulaihi | | (substituted on) 88' |
| DF | 88 | (Saudi Arabia) Hamad Al-Yami | | (substituted on) 88' |
| MF | 18 | (Saudi Arabia) Musab Al-Juwayr | | (substituted on) 106' |
| MF | 7 | (Saudi Arabia) Khalid Al-Ghannam | | (substituted on) 116' |
Manager:
(Italy) Simone Inzaghi

Man of the Match:
Marcos Leonardo (Al Hilal)

Assistant referees:
Jorge Urrego (Venezuela)
Tulio Moreno (Venezuela)
Fourth official:
Yael Falcón Pérez (Argentina)
Reserve assistant referee:
Maximiliano Del Yesso (Argentina)
Video assistant referee:
Juan Soto (Venezuela)
Assistant video assistant referee:
Hamza Al-Fariq (Morocco)
Support video assistant referee:
Alejandro Hernández Hernández (Spain)

=== Real Madrid vs Juventus ===
July 1, 2025
3:00 pm EDT

| Real Madrid (Spain) | 1–0 | (Italy) Juventus |
|---|---|---|
| G. García 54' | Report |

Hard Rock Stadium, Miami Gardens
Attendance: 62,149
Referee: Szymon Marciniak (Poland)

| Real Madrid | Juventus |

| GK | 1 | (Belgium) Thibaut Courtois |
| CB | 22 | (Germany) Antonio Rüdiger |
| CB | 14 | (France) Aurélien Tchouaméni |
| CB | 24 | (Spain) Dean Huijsen |
| RM | 12 | (England) Trent Alexander-Arnold |
| CM | 8 | (Uruguay) Federico Valverde (c) | | (substituted off) 90' |
| CM | 15 | (Turkey) Arda Güler | | (substituted off) 78' |
| LM | 20 | (Spain) Fran García |
| RF | 5 | (England) Jude Bellingham | (yellow card) 87' |
| CF | 30 | (Spain) Gonzalo García | | (substituted off) 68' |
| LF | 7 | (Brazil) Vinícius Júnior |
Substitutions:
| FW | 9 | (France) Kylian Mbappé | | (substituted on) 68' |
| MF | 10 | (Croatia) Luka Modrić | | (substituted on) 78' |
| MF | 19 | (Spain) Dani Ceballos | | (substituted on) 90' |
Manager:
(Spain) Xabi Alonso

| GK | 29 | (Italy) Michele Di Gregorio |
| CB | 15 | (France) Pierre Kalulu |
| CB | 24 | (Italy) Daniele Rugani | (substituted off) 86' |
| CB | 6 | (England) Lloyd Kelly | (substituted off) 59' |
| RM | 2 | (Portugal) Alberto Costa |
| CM | 5 | (Italy) Manuel Locatelli (c) | (substituted off) 86' |
| CM | 19 | (France) Khéphren Thuram |
| LM | 27 | (Italy) Andrea Cambiaso |
| RF | 7 | (Portugal) Francisco Conceição | (substituted off) 59' |
| CF | 20 | (France) Randal Kolo Muani |
| LF | 10 | (Turkey) Kenan Yıldız | (substituted off) 71' |
Substitutions:
| FW | 11 | (Argentina) Nicolás González | (substituted on) 59' |
| MF | 18 | (Serbia) Filip Kostić | (substituted on) 59' |
| MF | 8 | (Netherlands) Teun Koopmeiners | (substituted on) 71' |
| MF | 16 | (United States) Weston McKennie | (substituted on) 86' |
| DF | 4 | (Italy) Federico Gatti | (substituted on) 86' |
Manager:
(Croatia) Igor Tudor

Man of the Match:
Federico Valverde (Real Madrid)

Assistant referees:
Tomasz Listkiewicz (Poland)
Adam Kupsik (Poland)
Fourth official:
Espen Eskås (Norway)
Reserve assistant referee:
Isaak Bashevkin (Norway)
Video assistant referee:
Tomasz Kwiatkowski (Poland)
Assistant video assistant referee:
Ivan Bebek (Croatia)
Support video assistant referee:
Khamis Al-Marri (Qatar)

=== Borussia Dortmund vs Monterrey ===
July 1, 2025
9:00 pm EDT

| Borussia Dortmund (Germany) | 2–1 | (Mexico) Monterrey |
|---|---|---|
| Guirassy 14', 24' | Report | Berterame 48' |

Mercedes-Benz Stadium, Atlanta
Attendance: 31,442
Referee: Facundo Tello (Argentina)

| Borussia Dortmund | Monterrey |

| GK | 1 | (Switzerland) Gregor Kobel (c) |
| CB | 25 | (Germany) Niklas Süle |
| CB | 3 | (Germany) Waldemar Anton |
| CB | 5 | (Algeria) Ramy Bensebaini |
| RM | 26 | (Norway) Julian Ryerson |
| CM | 13 | (Germany) Pascal Groß |
| CM | 8 | (Germany) Felix Nmecha | | (substituted off) 70' |
| LM | 24 | (Sweden) Daniel Svensson |
| RF | 27 | (Germany) Karim Adeyemi | | (substituted off) 70' |
| CF | 9 | (Guinea) Serhou Guirassy | (yellow card) 90+3' |
| LF | 77 | (England) Jobe Bellingham | (yellow card) 28' | (substituted off) 55' |
Substitutions:
| MF | 20 | (Austria) Marcel Sabitzer | | (substituted on) 55' |
| FW | 10 | (Germany) Julian Brandt | | (substituted on) 70' |
| DF | 2 | (Brazil) Yan Couto | | (substituted on) 70' |
Manager:
(Croatia) Niko Kovač

| GK | 1 | (Argentina) Esteban Andrada |
| CB | 33 | (Colombia) Stefan Medina |
| CB | 30 | (Argentina) Jorge Rodríguez |
| CB | 93 | (Spain) Sergio Ramos (c) |
| RM | 14 | (Mexico) Érick Aguirre |
| CM | 8 | (Spain) Óliver Torres | (substituted off) 83' |
| CM | 6 | (Colombia) Nelson Deossa |
| CM | 10 | (Spain) Sergio Canales | (substituted off) 90' |
| LM | 3 | (Mexico) Gerardo Arteaga |
| CF | 7 | (Mexico) Germán Berterame | (substituted off) 83' |
| CF | 17 | (Mexico) Jesús Manuel Corona | (substituted off) 83' |
Substitutions:
| MF | 29 | (Argentina) Lucas Ocampos | (substituted on) 83' |
| FW | 31 | (Mexico) Roberto de la Rosa | (substituted on) 83' |
| MF | 5 | (Mexico) Fidel Ambríz | (substituted on) 83' |
| FW | 11 | (Mexico) Alfonso Alvarado | (substituted on) 90' |
Manager:
(Spain) Domènec Torrent

Man of the Match:
Serhou Guirassy (Borussia Dortmund)

Assistant referees:
Juan Pablo Belatti (Argentina)
Gabriel Chade (Argentina)
Fourth official:
Juan Gabriel Benítez (Paraguay)
Reserve assistant referee:
Eduardo Cardozo (Paraguay)
Video assistant referee:
Juan Lara (Chile)
Assistant video assistant referee:
Hernán Mastrángelo (Argentina)
Support video assistant referee:
Armando Villarreal (United States)

== Quarterfinals ==
=== Fluminense vs Al Hilal ===
July 4, 2025
3:00 pm EDT

| Fluminense (Brazil) | 2–1 | (Saudi Arabia) Al Hilal |
|---|---|---|
| Martinelli 40'; Hércules 70' | Report | Marcos Leonardo 51' |

Camping World Stadium, Orlando
Attendance: 43,091
Referee: Danny Makkelie (Netherlands)

| Fluminense | Al Hilal |

| GK | 1 | (Brazil) Fábio |
| CB | 4 | (Brazil) Ignácio |
| CB | 3 | (Brazil) Thiago Silva (c) | (yellow card) 64' |
| CB | 22 | (Argentina) Juan Pablo Freytes | (yellow card) 36' |
| RM | 2 | (Brazil) Samuel Xavier | | (substituted off) 83' |
| CM | 8 | (Brazil) Matheus Martinelli | (yellow card) 43' | (substituted off) 46' |
| CM | 5 | (Uruguay) Facundo Bernal | | (substituted off) 88' |
| CM | 16 | (Brazil) Nonato | | (substituted off) 68' |
| LM | 12 | (Colombia) Gabriel Fuentes |
| CF | 21 | (Colombia) Jhon Arias |
| CF | 14 | (Argentina) Germán Cano | | (substituted off) 68' |
Substitutions:
| MF | 35 | (Brazil) Hércules | | (substituted on) 46' |
| MF | 45 | (Brazil) Lima | | (substituted on) 68' |
| FW | 9 | (Brazil) Everaldo | | (substituted on) 68' |
| DF | 23 | (Brazil) Guga | | (substituted on) 83' |
| DF | 29 | (Brazil) Thiago Santos | | (substituted on) 88' |
Manager:
(Brazil) Renato Gaúcho

| GK | 37 | (Morocco) Yassine Bounou |
| CB | 3 | (Senegal) Kalidou Koulibaly | (yellow card) 90+7' |
| CB | 8 | (Portugal) Rúben Neves | (yellow card) 90' |
| CB | 6 | (Brazil) Renan Lodi | (yellow card) 21' |
| RM | 20 | (Portugal) João Cancelo | | (substituted off) 90+3' |
| CM | 22 | (Serbia) Sergej Milinković-Savić | (yellow card) 10' |
| CM | 28 | (Saudi Arabia) Mohamed Kanno (c) | | (substituted off) 75' |
| CM | 16 | (Saudi Arabia) Nasser Al-Dawsari | | (substituted off) 83' |
| LM | 24 | (Saudi Arabia) Moteb Al-Harbi | | (substituted off) 83' |
| CF | 77 | (Brazil) Malcom | | (substituted off) 90+3' |
| CF | 11 | (Brazil) Marcos Leonardo |
Substitutions:
| FW | 10 | (Morocco) Abderrazak Hamdallah | | (substituted on) 75' |
| MF | 27 | (Brazil) Kaio César | | (substituted on) 83' |
| DF | 5 | (Saudi Arabia) Ali Al-Bulaihi | | (substituted on) 83' |
| DF | 88 | (Saudi Arabia) Hamad Al-Yami | | (substituted on) 90+3' |
| MF | 18 | (Saudi Arabia) Musab Al-Juwayr | | (substituted on) 90+3' |
Manager:
| (Italy) Simone Inzaghi | | | (yellow card) 90' |

Man of the Match:
Hércules (Fluminense)

Assistant referees:
Hessel Steegstra (Netherlands)
Jan de Vries (Netherlands)
Fourth official:
Saíd Martínez (Honduras)
Reserve assistant referee:
Christian Ramírez (Honduras)
Video assistant referee:
Rob Dieperink (Netherlands)
Assistant video assistant referee:
Jérôme Brisard (France)
Support video assistant referee:
Carlos del Cerro Grande (Spain)

=== Palmeiras vs Chelsea ===
July 4, 2025
9:00 pm EDT

| Palmeiras (Brazil) | 1–2 | (England) Chelsea |
|---|---|---|
| Estêvão 53' | Report | Palmer 16'; Weverton 83' (o.g.) |

Lincoln Financial Field, Philadelphia
Attendance: 65,782
Referee: Alireza Faghani (Australia)

| Palmeiras | Chelsea |

| GK | 21 | (Brazil) Weverton (c) |
| CB | 4 | (Argentina) Agustín Giay |
| CB | 3 | (Brazil) Bruno Fuchs |
| CB | 13 | (Brazil) Micael |
| RWB | 40 | (Brazil) Allan | | (substituted off) 66' |
| LWB | 6 | (Brazil) Vanderlan |
| CM | 8 | (Colombia) Richard Ríos | (yellow card) 78' | (substituted off) 85' |
| CM | 32 | (Uruguay) Emiliano Martínez | | (substituted off) 76' |
| CM | 17 | (Uruguay) Facundo Torres | | (substituted off) 66' |
| CF | 41 | (Brazil) Estêvão |
| CF | 9 | (Brazil) Vitor Roque | | (substituted off) 76' |
Substitutions:
| FW | 10 | (Brazil) Paulinho | | (substituted on) 66' |
| FW | 18 | (Brazil) Maurício | | (substituted on) 66' |
| MF | 5 | (Argentina) Aníbal Moreno | | (substituted on) 76' |
| FW | 42 | (Argentina) José Manuel López | | (substituted on) 76' |
| MF | 23 | (Brazil) Raphael Veiga | | (substituted on) 85' |
Manager:
(Portugal) Abel Ferreira

| GK | 1 | (Spain) Robert Sánchez |
| RB | 27 | (France) Malo Gusto | (yellow card) 41' |
| CB | 23 | (England) Trevoh Chalobah |
| CB | 6 | (England) Levi Colwill | (yellow card) 86' |
| LB | 3 | (Spain) Marc Cucurella |
| DM | 17 | (Brazil) Andrey Santos | | (substituted off) 90+1' |
| CM | 10 | (England) Cole Palmer |
| CM | 8 | (Argentina) Enzo Fernández (c) |
| RF | 7 | (Portugal) Pedro Neto | | (substituted off) 87' |
| CF | 9 | (England) Liam Delap | (yellow card) 45+2' | (substituted off) 54' |
| LF | 18 | (France) Christopher Nkunku | | (substituted off) 54' |
Substitutions:
| FW | 11 | (England) Noni Madueke | | (substituted on) 54' |
| FW | 20 | (Brazil) João Pedro | | (substituted on) 54' |
| MF | 22 | (England) Kiernan Dewsbury-Hall | | (substituted on) 87' |
| MF | 14 | (Portugal) Dário Essugo | | (substituted on) 90+1' |
Manager:
(Italy) Enzo Maresca

Man of the Match:
Estêvão (Palmeiras)

Assistant referees:
Anton Shchetinin (Australia)
Ashley Beecham (Australia)
Fourth official:
Ilgiz Tantashev (Uzbekistan)
Reserve assistant referee:
Andrey Tsapenko (Uzbekistan)
Video assistant referee:
Khamis Al-Marri (Qatar)
Assistant video assistant referee:
Shaun Evans (Australia)
Support video assistant referee:
Bastian Dankert (Germany)

=== Paris Saint-Germain vs Bayern Munich ===
July 5, 2025
12:00 pm EDT

| Paris Saint-Germain (France) | 2–0 | (Germany) Bayern Munich |
|---|---|---|
| Doué 78'; Dembélé 90+6' | Report |

Mercedes-Benz Stadium, Atlanta
Attendance: 66,937
Referee: Anthony Taylor (England)

| Paris Saint-Germain | Bayern Munich |

| GK | 1 | (Italy) Gianluigi Donnarumma |
| RB | 2 | (Morocco) Achraf Hakimi |
| CB | 5 | (Brazil) Marquinhos (c) |
| CB | 51 | (Ecuador) Willian Pacho | (red card) 82' |
| LB | 25 | (Portugal) Nuno Mendes |
| DM | 17 | (Portugal) Vitinha |
| CM | 87 | (Portugal) João Neves |
| CM | 8 | (Spain) Fabián Ruiz | | (substituted off) 79' |
| RF | 29 | (France) Bradley Barcola | | (substituted off) 70' |
| CF | 14 | (France) Désiré Doué | (yellow card) 76' | (substituted off) 79' |
| LF | 7 | (Georgia (country)) Khvicha Kvaratskhelia | | (substituted off) 84' |
Substitutions:
| FW | 10 | (France) Ousmane Dembélé | | (substituted on) 70' |
| DF | 21 | (France) Lucas Hernandez | (red card) 90+2' | (substituted on) 79' |
| MF | 33 | (France) Warren Zaïre-Emery | | (substituted on) 79' |
| DF | 4 | (Brazil) Lucas Beraldo | | (substituted on) 84' |
Manager:
(Spain) Luis Enrique

| GK | 1 | (Germany) Manuel Neuer (c) |
| RB | 27 | (Austria) Konrad Laimer | (yellow card) 68' |
| CB | 2 | (France) Dayot Upamecano |
| CB | 4 | (Germany) Jonathan Tah |
| LB | 44 | (Croatia) Josip Stanišić | | (substituted off) 34' |
| CM | 6 | (Germany) Joshua Kimmich |
| CM | 45 | (Germany) Aleksandar Pavlović | | (substituted off) 80' |
| RW | 17 | (France) Michael Olise |
| AM | 42 | (Germany) Jamal Musiala | | (substituted off) 46' |
| LW | 11 | (France) Kingsley Coman | | (substituted off) 80' |
| CF | 9 | (England) Harry Kane |
Substitutions:
| DF | 23 | (France) Sacha Boey | | (substituted on) 34' (substituted off) 87' |
| FW | 7 | (Germany) Serge Gnabry | | (substituted on) 46' |
| FW | 25 | (Germany) Thomas Müller | | (substituted on) 80' |
| MF | 8 | (Germany) Leon Goretzka | | (substituted on) 80' |
| DF | 22 | (Portugal) Raphaël Guerreiro | | (substituted on) 87' |
Other disciplinary actions:
| TS | — | (Germany) Michael Rechner | (yellow card) 76' |
Manager:
(Belgium) Vincent Kompany

Man of the Match:
Désiré Doué (Paris Saint-Germain)

Assistant referees:
Gary Beswick (England)
Adam Nunn (England)
Fourth official:
Glenn Nyberg (Sweden)
Reserve assistant referee:
Andreas Söderkvist (Sweden)
Video assistant referee:
Ivan Bebek (Croatia)
Assistant video assistant referee:
Marco Di Bello (Italy)
Support video assistant referee:
Tatiana Guzmán (Nicaragua)

=== Real Madrid vs Borussia Dortmund ===
July 5, 2025
4:00 pm EDT

| Real Madrid (Spain) | 3–2 | (Germany) Borussia Dortmund |
|---|---|---|
| G. García 10'; F. García 20'; Mbappé 90+4' | Report | Beier 90+3'; Guirassy 90+8' (pen.) |

MetLife Stadium, East Rutherford
Attendance: 76,611
Referee: Ramon Abatti (Brazil)

| Real Madrid | Borussia Dortmund |

| GK | 1 | (Belgium) Thibaut Courtois |
| RB | 12 | (England) Trent Alexander-Arnold | | (substituted off) 67' |
| CB | 22 | (Germany) Antonio Rüdiger |
| CB | 24 | (Spain) Dean Huijsen | (red card) 90+5' |
| LB | 20 | (Spain) Fran García |
| CM | 14 | (France) Aurélien Tchouaméni | | (substituted off) 85' |
| CM | 15 | (Turkey) Arda Güler |
| RW | 8 | (Uruguay) Federico Valverde (c) |
| AM | 5 | (England) Jude Bellingham | | (substituted off) 67' |
| LW | 7 | (Brazil) Vinícius Júnior | | (substituted off) 67' |
| CF | 30 | (Spain) Gonzalo García | | (substituted off) 86' |
Substitutions:
| FW | 9 | (France) Kylian Mbappé | (yellow card) 90+8' | (substituted on) 67' |
| MF | 19 | (Spain) Dani Ceballos | | (substituted on) 67' |
| MF | 10 | (Croatia) Luka Modrić | | (substituted on) 67' |
| DF | 35 | (Spain) Raúl Asencio | | (substituted on) 85' |
| FW | 11 | (Brazil) Rodrygo | | (substituted on) 86' |
Manager:
(Spain) Xabi Alonso

| GK | 1 | (Switzerland) Gregor Kobel |
| CB | 25 | (Germany) Niklas Süle | | (substituted off) 46' |
| CB | 3 | (Germany) Waldemar Anton |
| CB | 5 | (Algeria) Ramy Bensebaini |
| RM | 26 | (Norway) Julian Ryerson |
| CM | 13 | (Germany) Pascal Groß | (yellow card) 37' | (substituted off) 46' |
| CM | 20 | (Austria) Marcel Sabitzer |
| CM | 10 | (Germany) Julian Brandt (c) | | (substituted off) 63' |
| LM | 24 | (Sweden) Daniel Svensson |
| CF | 9 | (Guinea) Serhou Guirassy |
| CF | 27 | (Germany) Karim Adeyemi | | (substituted off) 46' |
Substitutions:
| DF | 2 | (Brazil) Yan Couto | (yellow card) 63' | (substituted on) 46' |
| MF | 8 | (Germany) Felix Nmecha | | (substituted on) 46' |
| MF | 14 | (Germany) Maximilian Beier | | (substituted on) 46' |
| MF | 16 | (Belgium) Julien Duranville | | (substituted on) 63' (substituted off) 81' |
| MF | 17 | (England) Carney Chukwuemeka | | (substituted on) 81' |
Manager:
(Croatia) Niko Kovač

Man of the Match:
Fran García (Real Madrid)

Assistant referees:
Danilo Manis (Brazil)
Rafael Alves (Brazil)
Fourth official:
Cristián Garay (Chile)
Reserve assistant referee:
José Retamal (Chile)
Video assistant referee:
Nicolás Gallo (Colombia)
Assistant video assistant referee:
Guillermo Pacheco (Mexico)
Support video assistant referee:
Juan Lara (Chile)

== Semifinals ==
=== Fluminense vs Chelsea ===
July 8, 2025
3:00 pm EDT

| Fluminense (Brazil) | 0–2 | (England) Chelsea |
|---|---|---|
| | Report | João Pedro 18', 56' |

MetLife Stadium, East Rutherford
Attendance: 70,556
Referee: François Letexier (France)

| Fluminense | Chelsea |

| GK | 1 | (Brazil) Fábio |
| CB | 4 | (Brazil) Ignácio |
| CB | 3 | (Brazil) Thiago Silva (c) |
| CB | 29 | (Brazil) Thiago Santos | | (substituted off) 54' |
| RM | 23 | (Brazil) Guga |
| CM | 35 | (Brazil) Hércules | | (substituted off) 69' |
| CM | 5 | (Uruguay) Facundo Bernal | | (substituted off) 69' |
| LM | 6 | (Brazil) Renê |
| AM | 16 | (Brazil) Nonato | (yellow card) 59' | (substituted off) 66' |
| CF | 21 | (Colombia) Jhon Arias |
| CF | 14 | (Argentina) Germán Cano | | (substituted off) 54' |
Substitutions:
| FW | 9 | (Brazil) Everaldo | | (substituted on) 54' |
| FW | 11 | (Brazil) Keno | | (substituted on) 54' |
| FW | 7 | (Venezuela) Yeferson Soteldo | (yellow card) 72' | (substituted on) 66' |
| MF | 45 | (Brazil) Lima | | (substituted on) 69' |
| FW | 17 | (Uruguay) Agustín Canobbio | | (substituted on) 69' |
Manager:
(Brazil) Renato Gaúcho

| GK | 1 | (Spain) Robert Sánchez | (yellow card) 73' |
| RB | 27 | (France) Malo Gusto | | (substituted off) 68' |
| CB | 23 | (England) Trevoh Chalobah |
| CB | 4 | (England) Tosin Adarabioyo |
| LB | 3 | (Spain) Marc Cucurella |
| DM | 25 | (Ecuador) Moisés Caicedo |
| CM | 10 | (England) Cole Palmer |
| CM | 8 | (Argentina) Enzo Fernández (c) | | (substituted off) 86' |
| RF | 18 | (France) Christopher Nkunku | | (substituted off) 86' |
| CF | 20 | (Brazil) João Pedro | | (substituted off) 60' |
| LF | 7 | (Portugal) Pedro Neto | | (substituted off) 68' |
Substitutions:
| FW | 15 | (Senegal) Nicolas Jackson | | (substituted on) 60' |
| FW | 11 | (England) Noni Madueke | | (substituted on) 68' |
| DF | 24 | (England) Reece James | | (substituted on) 68' |
| MF | 22 | (England) Kiernan Dewsbury-Hall | | (substituted on) 86' |
| MF | 17 | (Brazil) Andrey Santos | | (substituted on) 86' |
Manager:
(Italy) Enzo Maresca

Man of the Match:
João Pedro (Chelsea)

Assistant referees:
Cyril Mugnier (France)
Mehdi Rahmouni (France)
Fourth official:
Iván Barton (El Salvador)
Reserve assistant referee:
David Morán (El Salvador)
Video assistant referee:
Nicolás Gallo (Colombia)
Assistant video assistant referee:
Jérôme Brisard (France)
Support video assistant referee:
Carlos del Cerro Grande (Spain)

=== Paris Saint-Germain vs Real Madrid ===
July 9, 2025
3:10 pm EDT (Note: The match, originally scheduled for 3:00 pm EDT, was delayed to 3:10 pm EDT due to the late arrival of the team buses.)

| Paris Saint-Germain (France) | 4–0 | (Spain) Real Madrid |
|---|---|---|
| Fabián 6', 24'; Dembélé 9'; Ramos 87' | Report |

MetLife Stadium, East Rutherford
Attendance: 77,542
Referee: Szymon Marciniak (Poland)

| Paris Saint-Germain | Real Madrid |

| GK | 1 | (Italy) Gianluigi Donnarumma |
| RB | 2 | (Morocco) Achraf Hakimi |
| CB | 5 | (Brazil) Marquinhos (c) |
| CB | 4 | (Brazil) Lucas Beraldo |
| LB | 25 | (Portugal) Nuno Mendes | | (substituted off) 79' |
| DM | 17 | (Portugal) Vitinha |
| CM | 87 | (Portugal) João Neves | (yellow card) 45+2' |
| CM | 8 | (Spain) Fabián Ruiz | | (substituted off) 66' |
| RF | 14 | (France) Désiré Doué | | (substituted off) 66' |
| CF | 10 | (France) Ousmane Dembélé | | (substituted off) 59' |
| LF | 7 | (Georgia (country)) Khvicha Kvaratskhelia | | (substituted off) 59' |
Substitutions:
| FW | 9 | (Portugal) Gonçalo Ramos | | (substituted on) 59' |
| FW | 29 | (France) Bradley Barcola | | (substituted on) 59' |
| MF | 33 | (France) Warren Zaïre-Emery | | (substituted on) 66' |
| MF | 24 | (France) Senny Mayulu | | (substituted on) 66' |
| MF | 19 | (South Korea) Lee Kang-in | | (substituted on) 79' |
Manager:
(Spain) Luis Enrique

| GK | 1 | (Belgium) Thibaut Courtois |
| RB | 8 | (Uruguay) Federico Valverde (c) |
| CB | 35 | (Spain) Raúl Asencio | | (substituted off) 64' |
| CB | 22 | (Germany) Antonio Rüdiger |
| LB | 20 | (Spain) Fran García |
| DM | 14 | (France) Aurélien Tchouaméni | (yellow card) 28' |
| CM | 15 | (Turkey) Arda Güler | | (substituted off) 83' |
| CM | 5 | (England) Jude Bellingham | | (substituted off) 64' |
| RF | 9 | (France) Kylian Mbappé |
| CF | 30 | (Spain) Gonzalo García | | (substituted off) 71' |
| LF | 7 | (Brazil) Vinícius Júnior | | (substituted off) 64' |
Substitutions:
| DF | 3 | (Brazil) Éder Militão | | (substituted on) 64' |
| FW | 21 | (Morocco) Brahim Díaz | | (substituted on) 64' |
| MF | 10 | (Croatia) Luka Modrić | | (substituted on) 64' |
| DF | 2 | (Spain) Dani Carvajal | (yellow card) 73' | (substituted on) 71' |
| DF | 17 | (Spain) Lucas Vázquez | | (substituted on) 83' |
Manager:
(Spain) Xabi Alonso

Man of the Match:
Fabián Ruiz (Paris Saint-Germain)

Assistant referees:
Tomasz Listkiewicz (Poland)
Adam Kupsik (Poland)
Fourth official:
Mustapha Ghorbal (Algeria)
Reserve assistant referee:
Abbes Akram Zerhouni (Algeria)
Video assistant referee:
Tomasz Kwiatkowski (Poland)
Assistant video assistant referee:
Rob Dieperink (Netherlands)
Support video assistant referee:
Guillermo Pacheco (Mexico)

== Final ==
July 13, 2025
3:00 pm EDT

| Chelsea (The Football Association) | 3–0 | (French Football Federation) Paris Saint-Germain |
|---|---|---|
| Palmer 22', 30'; João Pedro 43' | Report |

MetLife Stadium, East Rutherford
Attendance: 81,118
Referee: Alireza Faghani (Australia)

| Chelsea | Paris Saint-Germain |

| GK | 1 | (Spain) Robert Sánchez |
| RB | 27 | (France) Malo Gusto | (yellow card) 40' |
| CB | 23 | (England) Trevoh Chalobah |
| CB | 6 | (England) Levi Colwill | (yellow card) 81' |
| LB | 3 | (Spain) Marc Cucurella |
| CM | 24 | (England) Reece James (c) | | (substituted off) 77' |
| CM | 25 | (Ecuador) Moisés Caicedo | (yellow card) 36' |
| RW | 10 | (England) Cole Palmer |
| AM | 8 | (Argentina) Enzo Fernández | | (substituted off) 61' |
| LW | 7 | (Portugal) Pedro Neto | (yellow card) 34' | (substituted off) 77' |
| CF | 20 | (Brazil) João Pedro | | (substituted off) 67' |
Substitutes:
| GK | 12 | (Denmark) Filip Jörgensen |
| GK | 39 | (Belgium) Mike Penders |
| GK | 44 | (United States) Gabriel Slonina |
| DF | 4 | (England) Tosin Adarabioyo |
| DF | 19 | (France) Mamadou Sarr |
| DF | 30 | (Argentina) Aarón Anselmino |
| DF | 34 | (England) Josh Acheampong |
| MF | 17 | (Brazil) Andrey Santos | | (substituted on) 61' |
| MF | 22 | (England) Kiernan Dewsbury-Hall | | (substituted on) 77' |
| MF | 45 | (Belgium) Roméo Lavia |
| FW | 9 | (England) Liam Delap | | (substituted on) 67' |
| FW | 15 | (Senegal) Nicolas Jackson |
| FW | 18 | (France) Christopher Nkunku | | (substituted on) 77' |
| FW | 32 | (England) Tyrique George |
| FW | 38 | (Spain) Marc Guiu |
Manager:
(Italy) Enzo Maresca

| GK | 1 | (Italy) Gianluigi Donnarumma |
| RB | 2 | (Morocco) Achraf Hakimi | | (substituted off) 73' |
| CB | 5 | (Brazil) Marquinhos (c) |
| CB | 4 | (Brazil) Lucas Beraldo |
| LB | 25 | (Portugal) Nuno Mendes | (yellow card) 90+4' |
| DM | 17 | (Portugal) Vitinha |
| CM | 87 | (Portugal) João Neves | (red card) 85' |
| CM | 8 | (Spain) Fabián Ruiz | | (substituted off) 73' |
| RF | 14 | (France) Désiré Doué | | (substituted off) 73' |
| CF | 10 | (France) Ousmane Dembélé | (yellow card) 87' |
| LF | 7 | (Georgia (country)) Khvicha Kvaratskhelia | | (substituted off) 58' |
Substitutes:
| GK | 39 | (Russia) Matvey Safonov |
| GK | 80 | (Spain) Arnau Tenas |
| DF | 3 | (France) Presnel Kimpembe |
| DF | 43 | (France) Noham Kamara |
| MF | 19 | (South Korea) Lee Kang-in |
| MF | 20 | (Brazil) Gabriel Moscardo |
| MF | 24 | (France) Senny Mayulu | | (substituted on) 73' |
| MF | 33 | (France) Warren Zaïre-Emery | | (substituted on) 73' |
| FW | 9 | (Portugal) Gonçalo Ramos | | (substituted on) 73' |
| FW | 29 | (France) Bradley Barcola | | (substituted on) 58' |
| FW | 49 | (France) Ibrahim Mbaye |
Manager:
(Spain) Luis Enrique

Man of the Match:
Cole Palmer (Chelsea)

Assistant referees:
Anton Shchetinin (Australia)
Ashley Beecham (Australia)
Fourth official:
Facundo Tello (Argentina)
Reserve assistant referee:
Gabriel Chade (Argentina)
Video assistant referee:
Bastian Dankert (Germany)
Assistant video assistant referee:
Tatiana Guzmán (Nicaragua)
Support video assistant referee:
Ivan Bebek (Croatia)
