= 2024–25 Al Hilal SFC season =

Al Hilal
2024–25 season
- President: Fahad bin Nafel
- Head coach: Jorge Jesus (until 3 May); Mohammad Al-Shalhoub (from 3 May until 4 June); Simone Inzaghi (from 4 June)
- Stadium: Kingdom Arena
- Pro League: 2nd
- King's Cup: Quarter-finals (knocked out by Al-Ittihad)
- ACL Elite: Semi-finals (knocked out by Al-Ahli)
- Super Cup: Winners
- FIFA Club World Cup: Quarter-finals (knocked out by Fluminense)
- Top goalscorer: League: Aleksandar Mitrović (19); All: Marcos Leonardo (29)
Home colours	Away colours	Third colours

The 2024–25 season was Al Hilal's 49th consecutive season in the top flight of Saudi football and 67th year in existence as a football club. The club participated in the Pro League, the King Cup, the AFC Champions League Elite, the Saudi Super Cup, and the FIFA Club World Cup.

The season covered the period from 1 July 2024 to 4 July 2025.

== Players ==
=== Squad information ===
As of 27 January 2025

Note: Flags indicate national team as defined under FIFA eligibility rules; some limited exceptions apply. Players may hold more than one non-FIFA nationality.

No.	Pos.	Nation	Player
3	DF	SEN	Kalidou Koulibaly
4	DF	KSA	Khalifah Al-Dawsari
5	DF	KSA	Ali Al-Bulaihi
6	DF	BRA	Renan Lodi
7	MF	KSA	Khalid Al-Ghannam
8	MF	POR	Ruben Neves
9	FW	SRB	Aleksandar Mitrović
11	FW	BRA	Marcos Leonardo
12	DF	KSA	Yasser Al-Shahrani
15	FW	KSA	Mohammed Al-Qahtani
16	MF	KSA	Nasser Al-Dawsari
17	GK	KSA	Mohammed Al-Rubaie
20	DF	POR	João Cancelo
21	GK	KSA	Mohammed Al-Owais
22	MF	SRB	Sergej Milinković-Savić

No.	Pos.	Nation	Player
24	DF	KSA	Moteb Al-Harbi
27	MF	BRA	Kaio César
28	MF	KSA	Mohamed Kanno
29	MF	KSA	Salem Al-Dawsari
33	DF	KSA	Mohammed Al-Muhaysh
34	DF	KSA	Saleh Barnawi
37	GK	MAR	Yassine Bounou
38	FW	KSA	Turki Al-Ghumail
39	FW	KSA	Abdulaziz Hadhood
40	GK	KSA	Ahmed Abu Rasen
50	GK	KSA	Abdulelah Al-Ghamdi
77	FW	BRA	Malcom
87	DF	KSA	Hassan Al-Tambakti
88	DF	KSA	Hamad Al-Yami
99	FW	KSA	Abdullah Al-Hamdan

== Transfers and loans ==
=== Transfers in ===
Entry date	Position	No.	Player	From club	Fee	Ref.
30 June 2024	GK	60	(Saudi Arabia) Ahmed Al Jubaya	(Saudi Arabia) Al-Qadsiah	End of loan	
30 June 2024	DF	42	(Saudi Arabia) Muath Faqeehi	(Saudi Arabia) Al-Taawoun	End of loan	
30 June 2024	DF	88	(Saudi Arabia) Hamad Al-Yami	(Saudi Arabia) Al-Shabab	End of loan	
30 June 2024	MF	15	(Brazil) Matheus Pereira	(Brazil) Cruzeiro	End of loan	
30 June 2024	MF	18	(Saudi Arabia) Musab Al-Juwayr	(Saudi Arabia) Al-Shabab	End of loan	
30 June 2024	MF	57	(Saudi Arabia) Nasser Al-Hadhood	(Saudi Arabia) Al-Raed	End of loan	
30 June 2024	FW	–	(Saudi Arabia) Abdullah Radif	(Saudi Arabia) Al-Shabab	End of loan	
27 August 2024	DF	20	(Portugal) João Cancelo	(England) Manchester City	$27,800,000	
1 September 2024	DF	24	(Saudi Arabia) Moteb Al-Harbi	(Saudi Arabia) Al-Shabab	$32,000,000	
2 September 2024	FW	11	(Brazil) Marcos Leonardo	(Portugal) Benfica	$44,400,000	
21 January 2025	MF	27	(Brazil) Kaio César	(Portugal) Vitória Guimarães	$9,400,000	
9 June 2025	DF	78	(Saudi Arabia) Ali Lajami	(Saudi Arabia) Al-Nassr	$1,066,000	

=== Transfers out ===
Exit date	Position	No.	Player	To club	Fee	Ref.
1 July 2024	MF	15	(Brazil) Matheus Pereira	(Brazil) Cruzeiro	$5,345,000	
11 July 2024	DF	32	(Saudi Arabia) Muteb Al-Mufarrij	(Saudi Arabia) Al-Taawoun	Free	
12 July 2024	DF	70	(Saudi Arabia) Mohammed Jahfali	(Saudi Arabia) Al-Kholood	Free	
19 July 2024	MF	–	(Saudi Arabia) Riyadh Al-Asmari	(Saudi Arabia) Al-Najma	Free	
21 July 2024	DF	42	(Saudi Arabia) Muath Faqeehi	(Saudi Arabia) Al-Ittihad	$2,600,000	
22 July 2024	FW	11	(Saudi Arabia) Saleh Al-Shehri	(Saudi Arabia) Al-Ittihad	Free	
28 July 2024	MF	7	(Saudi Arabia) Salman Al-Faraj	(Saudi Arabia) Neom	Undisclosed	
4 August 2024	GK	60	(Saudi Arabia) Ahmed Al Jubaya	(Saudi Arabia) Al-Ula	Free	
5 August 2024	MF	45	(Saudi Arabia) Faisal Al-Asmari	(Saudi Arabia) Al-Ula	Free	
11 August 2024	MF	57	(Saudi Arabia) Nasser Al-Hadhood	(Saudi Arabia) Al-Ula	Free	
15 August 2024	DF	–	(Saudi Arabia) Rayan Sharahili	(Saudi Arabia) Al-Bukiryah	Free	
22 August 2024	MF	96	(Brazil) Michael	(Brazil) Flamengo	Free	
27 August 2024	DF	66	(Saudi Arabia) Saud Abdulhamid	(Italy) Roma	$2,765,000	
1 September 2024	GK	31	(Saudi Arabia) Habib Al-Wotayan	(Saudi Arabia) Al-Fateh	Free	
2 September 2024	FW	–	(Egypt) Karim Ashraf	(Saudi Arabia) Al-Okhdood	Free	
3 September 2024	DF	2	(Saudi Arabia) Mohammed Al-Breik	(Saudi Arabia) Neom	$2,600,000	
12 September 2024	MF	–	(Saudi Arabia) Nasser Kaabi	(Saudi Arabia) Al-Bukiryah	Free	
31 January 2025	FW	10	(Brazil) Neymar	(Brazil) Santos	Free	

=== Loans out ===
Start date	End date	Position	No.	Player	To club	Fee	Ref.
9 July 2024	End of season	MF	26	(Saudi Arabia) Abdulellah Al-Malki	(Saudi Arabia) Al-Ettifaq	None	
18 July 2024	End of season	DF	58	(Saudi Arabia) Mohammed Barnawi	(Saudi Arabia) Al-Orobah	None	
5 August 2024	End of season	MF	33	(Saudi Arabia) Abdullah Al-Zaid	(Saudi Arabia) Neom	None	
19 August 2024	End of season	GK	40	(Saudi Arabia) Ahmed Abu Rasen	(Saudi Arabia) Neom	None	
24 August 2024	End of season	MF	39	(Saudi Arabia) Mohammed Al-Zaid	(Saudi Arabia) Al-Bukiryah	None	
25 August 2024	End of season	MF	44	(Saudi Arabia) Suhayb Al-Zaid	(Saudi Arabia) Al-Fateh	None	
1 September 2024	End of season	MF	18	(Saudi Arabia) Musab Al-Juwayr	(Saudi Arabia) Al-Shabab	None	
2 September 2024	End of season	FW	20	(Saudi Arabia) Abdullah Radif	(Saudi Arabia) Al-Ettifaq	None	

== Pre-season and friendlies ==
19 July 2024 Friendly	Al-Hilal (Saudi Arabia)	6–0	(Austria) Fortuna Wiener Neustädter	Wiener Neustadt, Austria
18:00 CEST	Mitrović 3'; K. Al-Dawsari 12'; Al-Hamdan 18'; S. Al-Dawsari 36'; Al-Qahtani 48', 83'	Report		Stadium: Stadion Wiener Neustadt

22 July 2024 Friendly	Al-Hilal (Saudi Arabia)	2–0	(Qatar) Al-Arabi	Wiener Neustadt, Austria
18:00 CEST	Michael 11'; N. Al-Dawsari 16'	Report		Stadium: Stadion Wiener Neustadt

26 July 2024 Friendly	Al-Hilal (Saudi Arabia)	1–2	(South Africa) Mamelodi Sundowns	Schwechat, Austria
16:30 CEST	Mitrović 58' (pen.)	Report	Riberio 50'; Modiba 64'	Stadium: Rudolf-Tonn-Stadion

29 July 2024 Friendly	Al-Hilal (Saudi Arabia)	1–0	(Italy) Como	Bad Kleinkirchheim, Austria
18:00 CEST	Mitrović 63'	Report		Stadium: SportArena

31 July 2024 Friendly	Al-Hilal (Saudi Arabia)	2–1	(Qatar) Al-Duhail	Bad Erlach, Austria
18:00 CEST	Al-Juwayr 7'; Al-Qahtani 45+1'	Report	Olunga 51'	Stadium: Sportplatz Bad Erlach

3 August 2024 Friendly	Al-Hilal (Saudi Arabia)	1–0	(Italy) Udinese	Bad Kleinkirchheim, Austria
18:00 CEST	Neves 48'	Report		Stadium: SportArena

8 August 2024 Friendly	Al-Hilal (Saudi Arabia)	3–1	(Saudi Arabia) Al-Najma	Riyadh, Saudi Arabia
19:30 AST	Mitrović; Al-Hamdan; S. Al-Dawsari	Report	Adnan	Stadium: Al-Hilal Club Stadium

== Competitions ==
=== Overview ===
Competition	Record							
Competition	Pld	W	D	L	GF	GA	GD	Win %
Pro League	34	23	6	5	95	41	+54	67.65
King Cup	3	2	1	0	7	3	+4	66.67
ACL Elite	12	9	1	2	38	11	+27	75.00
Super Cup	2	1	1	0	5	2	+3	50.00
FIFA Club World Cup	5	2	2	1	8	6	+2	40.00
Total	54	36	11	7	148	58	+90	66.67

Source: Competitions

=== Pro League ===
==== League table ====
Pos	Team	Pld	W	D	L	GF	GA	GD	Pts	Qualification or relegation
1	Al-Ittihad (C)	34	26	5	3	79	35	+44	83	Qualification for AFC Champions League Elite League stage
2	Al-Hilal	34	23	6	5	95	41	+54	75	Qualification for AFC Champions League Elite League stage
3	Al-Nassr	34	21	7	6	80	38	+42	70	Qualification for AFC Champions League Two group stage (Note: Since the winners of the 2024–25 King's Cup, Al-Ittihad, had already qualified for the Champions League Elite, the spot given to the King's Cup winners (Champions League Two) was passed to the third-placed team.)
4	Al-Qadsiah	34	21	5	8	53	31	+22	68	
5	Al-Ahli	34	21	4	9	69	36	+33	67	Qualification for AFC Champions League Elite League stage (Note: By virtue of winning 2024–25 AFC Champions League Elite.)

Source: SPL
Rules for classification: 1) Points; 2) Head-to-head points; 3) Head-to-head goal difference; 4) Total goal difference; 5) Total goals scored; 6) Fair-play points
(Note: Head-to-head record is used only after all the matches between the teams in question have been played).
(C) Champions

==== Results summary ====
Overall								Home						Away					
Pld	W	D	L	GF	GA	GD	Pts	W	D	L	GF	GA	GD	W	D	L	GF	GA	GD
34	23	6	5	95	41	+54	75	13	2	2	54	17	+37	10	4	3	41	24	+17

Source: Saudi Pro League

==== Results by round ====
Round	1	2	3	4	5	6	7	8	9	10	11	12	13	14	15	16	17	18	19	20	21	22	23	24	25	26	27	28	29	30	31	32	33	34
Ground	A	H	A	H	A	A	H	H	A	H	A	A	H	A	H	H	A	H	A	H	A	H	H	A	A	H	A	H	H	A	H	A	A	H
Result	W	W	W	W	W	W	W	W	D	W	L	W	W	W	W	W	L	W	D	D	L	W	L	W	W	L	D	W	D	W	W	W	D	W
Position	1	1	2	1	1	1	1	1	1	1	2	2	2	1	1	1	1	1	2	2	2	2	2	2	2	2	2	2	2	2	2	2	2	2

Source: Saudi Pro League
A = Away; H = Home; W = Win; D = Draw; L = Loss

==== Matches ====
All times are local, AST (UTC+3).

Win Draw Loss Postponed

24 August 2024 1	Al-Okhdood	0–3	Al-Hilal	Najran
21:00	Hawsawi (yellow card) 20'; Al-Muwallad (yellow card) 30'; Al-Zabdani (yellow card) 38'	Report	Mitrović 4', 39'; Milinković-Savić 45+1'	Stadium: Prince Hathloul bin Abdulaziz Sports City; Attendance: 5,099; Referee: Fedayi San (Switzerland)

28 August 2024 2	Al-Hilal	3–2	Damac	Riyadh
21:00	Mitrović 45+5', 84'; Neves (yellow card) 63'; Al-Juwayr 73'; Lodi (yellow card) 86'	Report	Stanciu (yellow card) 38'; Kamano 49'; Diallo 53'; Solan (yellow card) 58'; Al-Anazi (yellow card) 76'	Stadium: Prince Faisal bin Fahd Sports City; Attendance: 8,989; Referee: István Kovács (Romania)

14 September 2024 3	Al-Riyadh	0–3	Al-Hilal	Riyadh
21:00	Kal (yellow card) 30'; Al-Khaibari (yellow card) 57'; Assiri (yellow card) 83'	Report	Koulibaly (yellow card) 24'; S. Al-Dawsari 53'; Cancelo (yellow card) 59'; Barbet 80' (o.g.); Mitrović 90+10'	Stadium: Prince Faisal bin Fahd Sports City; Attendance: 8,914; Referee: Tamás Bognár (Hungary)

21 September 2024 4	Al-Hilal	3–1	Al-Ittihad	Riyadh
21:00	Mitrović 3', 14' (pen.); S. Al-Dawsari 37'; Malcom (yellow card) 45+1'	Report	Kanté (yellow card) 11'; Pereira (yellow card) 17'; Benzema 86'	Stadium: Prince Faisal bin Fahd Sports City; Attendance: 15,666; Referee: Sandro Schärer (Switzerland)

28 September 2024 5	Al-Kholood	2–4	Al-Hilal	Buraidah
21:00	N'Doram (yellow card) 55'; Al-Safri (yellow card) 59'; Al-Hammami 71'; Troost-Ekong 87' (pen.)	Report	Koulibaly 38'; Malcom 43'; Al-Bulaihi 45+3'; Lodi 48'; N. Al-Dawsari (yellow card) 53'; Bounou (yellow card) 86'	Stadium: King Abdullah Sports City; Attendance: 9,937; Referee: Anastasios Sidiropoulos (Greece)

5 October 2024 6	Al-Ahli	1–2	Al-Hilal	Jeddah
21:00	Veiga 12'; Ibañez (yellow card) 37'; Hamed (yellow card) 75'; Majrashi (yellow card) 90'	Report	Mitrović 56', 78' (pen.), (yellow card) 90+4'; S. Al-Dawsari (yellow card) 75'	Stadium: King Abdullah Sports City; Attendance: 53,036; Referee: Slavko Vinčić (Slovenia)

18 October 2024 7	Al-Hilal	3–0	Al-Fayha	Riyadh
18:00	Marcos Leonardo 5'; S. Al-Dawsari 65'; Al-Qahtani 81'	Report	Abdi (yellow card) 41'; Shukurov (yellow card) 58'	Stadium: Kingdom Arena; Attendance: 15,570; Referee: Radu Petrescu (Romania)

26 October 2024 8	Al-Hilal	2–0	Al-Taawoun	Riyadh
21:00	Mitrović 15'; S. Al-Dawsari (yellow card) 36'; Milinković-Savić (yellow card) 57', (goal) 62'	Report		Stadium: Kingdom Arena; Attendance: 16,321; Referee: Andrés Rojas (Colombia)

1 November 2024 9	Al-Nassr	1–1	Al-Hilal	Riyadh
21:00	Talisca 1'; Brozović (yellow card) 20'; Mané (yellow card) 43'; Ronaldo (yellow card) 45+1'; Al-Khaibari (yellow card) 52'; Otávio (yellow card) 84'	Report	Malcom (yellow card) 57'; Kanno (yellow card) 60'; Milinković-Savić 77'; Al-Bulaihi (yellow card) 82'; N. Al-Dawsari (yellow card) 90+4'	Stadium: Al-Awwal Park; Attendance: 25,490; Referee: Felix Zwayer (Germany)

8 November 2024 10	Al-Hilal	3–1	Al-Ettifaq	Riyadh
17:45	Cancelo (yellow card) 24'; Mitrović 45+2'; N. Al-Dawsari (yellow card) 50'; Malcom 81'; Al-Qahtani 90+6'	Report	Al-Olayan (yellow card) 22'; Al-Malki (yellow card) 45+3'; Al-Sebyani (yellow card) 74'; Vitinho 90+4' (pen.); Radif (red card) 90+8'	Stadium: Kingdom Arena; Attendance: 17,296

23 November 2024 11	Al-Khaleej	3–2	Al-Hilal	Dammam
20:00	Al-Khabrani (yellow card) 9'; Al Salem 45', 47'; Martins 85'; Narey (yellow card) 90'	Report	Marcos Leonardo 12'; Mitrović 37'	Stadium: Prince Mohamed bin Fahd Stadium; Attendance: 17,150; Referee: Andris Treimanis (Latvia)

30 November 2024 12	Al-Shabab	1–2	Al-Hilal	Riyadh
20:00	Hamdallah 6' Al-Juwayr (yellow card) 16'; Hoedt (yellow card) 32'; Al-Sharari (yellow card) 49', (red card) 58'	Report	Milinković-Savić 14', 62'; Koulibaly (red card) 44'; Al-Tombakti (yellow card) 90+6'	Stadium: Al-Shabab Club Stadium; Attendance: 11,507; Referee: Halil Umut Meler (Turkey)

7 December 2024 13	Al-Hilal	3–2	Al-Raed	Riyadh
17:40	Milinković-Savić 42'; Mitrović (yellow card) 60'; Marcos Leonardo 87'; Al-Bulaihi 90+14'	Report	El Berkaoui 7'; Sayoud (yellow card) 39'; Al-Dossari (yellow card) 59'; Sunbul 77'; Hawsawi (yellow card) 79'; Moreira (yellow card) 81'; Abeid (yellow card) 90+10'	Stadium: Kingdom Arena; Attendance: 16,203; Referee: Tamás Bognár (Hungary)

11 January 2025 14	Al-Orobah	0–5	Al-Hilal	Sakakah
16:45	Al-Shuwaish (yellow card) 4'; Al-Saiari (yellow card) 13'; Al-Maqati (yellow card) 14'; Young (yellow card) 90+3'	Report	Neves 16' (pen.); Al-Bulaihi 48'; Lodi 68', (yellow card) 82'; Marcos Leonardo 75', 78'	Stadium: Al Jouf University Stadium; Attendance: 8,300; Referee: Rade Obrenovič (Slovenia)

16 January 2025 15	Al-Hilal	9–0	Al-Fateh	Riyadh
18:05	Neves (yellow card) 7'; Koulibaly 20'; Lodi 39'; Marcos Leonardo 45+6' (pen.), 54', 65'; Milinković-Savić 45+9'; Al-Hamdan 89'; Malcom 90+5'; Al-Abdulwahed 90+8' (o.g.); Cancelo (yellow card) 90+10'	Report	Baattiah (yellow card) 45+8'; Al-Zaid (yellow card) 64'; Al-Daheem (yellow card) 70'; Al-Abdulwahed (yellow card) 90+8'; Al-Jari (red card) 90+11'	Stadium: Kingdom Arena; Attendance: 24,962; Referee: Sergei Karasev (Russia)

21 January 2025 16	Al-Hilal	4–1	Al-Wehda	Riyadh
20:00	Marcos Leonardo 7'; Malcom 11', 82'; Lodi (yellow card) 87'; Al-Hamdan 90+1'	Report	Al-Hejji (yellow card) 76'; Goodwin 89'	Stadium: Kingdom Arena; Attendance: 20,044; Referee: Leandro Rey Hilfer (Argentina)

27 January 2025 17	Al-Qadsiah	2–1	Al-Hilal	Dammam
20:00	Aubameyang 2', 90+3'; Nández (yellow card) 31'	Report	Al-Tombakti (yellow card) 18'; Marcos Leonardo 50'; Al-Bulaihi (yellow card) 65'	Stadium: Prince Mohamed bin Fahd Stadium; Attendance: 17,402; Referee: Julian Weinberger (Austria)

31 January 2025 18	Al-Hilal	4–0	Al-Okhdood	Riyadh
18:15	Kaio 4'; Milinković-Savić 43'; Marcos Leonardo 45+2', 55'	Report	Koné (yellow card) 26'; Godwin (yellow card) 29'; Al-Rubaie (yellow card) 44'	Stadium: Kingdom Arena; Attendance: 22,326; Referee: Marian Barbu (Romania)

8 February 2025 19	Damac	2–2	Al-Hilal	Abha
20:00	Al-Anazi (yellow card) 14'; Al-Sibyani (yellow card) 45+1'; Bedrane (yellow card) 45+3'; Diallo 50', 73'; Abdullah (yellow card) 90+7'	Report	Marcos Leonardo 32'; Al-Tombakti (yellow card) 45+3'; Neves (yellow card) 68'; Milinković-Savić 77'; Malcom (yellow card) 90+5'; Cancelo (yellow card) 90+7'	Stadium: Prince Sultan bin Abdulaziz Sports City; Attendance: 15,066; Referee: Sven Jablonski (Germany)

14 February 2025 20	Al-Hilal	1–1	Al-Riyadh	Riyadh
20:00	S. Al-Dawsari 60'; Kanno (yellow card) 90+4'	Report	Konaté 45+1'; Mensah (yellow card) 87'	Stadium: Kingdom Arena; Attendance: 21,137; Referee: Iván Barton (El Salvador)

22 February 2025 21	Al-Ittihad	4–1	Al-Hilal	Jeddah
20:30	Kadesh 29', (yellow card) 69'; Bergwijn (yellow card) 36', (goal) 45', 51'; Al Mousa (yellow card) 63'; Benzema 86'	Report	Marcos Leonardo 23', (yellow card) 90+8'; Cancelo (yellow card) 78'; Al-Hamdan (yellow card) 90+2'	Stadium: King Abdullah Sports City; Attendance: 52,870; Referee: Daniel Siebert (Germany)

25 February 2025 22	Al-Hilal	5–1	Al-Kholood	Riyadh
18:30	Malcom 3', 20'; S. Al-Dawsari 4', 55'; Marcos Leonardo 28'	Report	Al-Safri 65'	Stadium: Kingdom Arena; Attendance: 17,781; Referee: Tamás Bognár (Hungary)

28 February 2025 23	Al-Hilal	2–3	Al-Ahli	Riyadh
22:00	Marcos Leonardo (yellow card) 29', (goal) 83' (pen.); S. Al-Dawsari 74'; N. Al-Dawsari (yellow card) 90+1'	Report	Balobaid (yellow card) 6'; Kessié (yellow card) 35'; Toney 47', 53', 87'	Stadium: Kingdom Arena; Attendance: 18,138; Referee: Irfan Peljto (Bosnia and Herzegovina)

7 March 2025 24	Al-Fayha	0–2	Al-Hilal	Buraidah
22:00	Al-Rashidi (yellow card) 7'; Vareta (yellow card) 82'	Report	Kanno 18'; Mitrović 89'	Stadium: King Abdullah Sports City; Attendance: 4,133; Referee: Bruno Arleu de Araújo (Brazil)

15 March 2025 25	Al-Taawoun	0–2	Al-Hilal	Buraidah
22:00	Rivas (yellow card) 46'	Report	Kanno 12'; Bounou (yellow card) 39'; Marcos Leonardo 75'; Al-Tombakti (yellow card) 90+4'	Stadium: King Abdullah Sports City; Attendance: 16,478; Referee: Donatas Rumšas (Lithuania)

4 April 2025 26	Al-Hilal	1–3	Al-Nassr	Riyadh
21:00	Neves (yellow card) 54'; Al-Bulaihi 62'	Report	Al-Hassan 45+4'; Ronaldo 47', 88' (pen.)	Stadium: Kingdom Arena; Attendance: 25,187; Referee: Georgi Kabakov (Bulgaria)

11 April 2025 27	Al-Ettifaq	1–1	Al-Hilal	Dammam
21:00	Costa (yellow card) 43', (goal) 45+6'; Al-Malki (yellow card) 46'; Vitinho (yellow card) 82'	Report	Lodi (yellow card) 45+5'; Malcom 57'; Koulibaly (yellow card) 62'	Stadium: EGO Stadium; Attendance: 10,237; Referee: Nikola Dabanović (Montenegro)

17 April 2025 28	Al-Hilal	3–0	Al-Khaleej	Riyadh
18:50	S. Al-Dawsari 26', 84'; Milinković-Savić (yellow card) 37'; Al-Shahrani (yellow card) 49'; Mitrović 88'	Report	Al Hamsal (yellow card) 57'	Stadium: Kingdom Arena; Attendance: 13,638; Referee: Serdar Gözübüyük (Netherlands)

21 April 2025 29	Al-Hilal	2–2	Al-Shabab	Riyadh
18:55	Milinković-Savić 31', (yellow card) 56'; Mitrović (yellow card) 38'; S. Al-Dawsari 46'	Report	Podence 7', (yellow card) 32'; Hoedt (yellow card) 20'; Al-Thani (yellow card) 32'; Hamdallah (yellow card) 38'; Al-Shuwayrikh 68'; Renan (yellow card) 80'	Stadium: Kingdom Arena; Attendance: 18,769; Referee: Rade Obrenovič (Slovenia)

7 May 2025 30	Al-Raed	3–5	Al-Hilal	Buraidah
19:15	El Berkaoui 45+3', 68'; Sayoud (yellow card) 73'; Al-Amri 90+9' (pen.)	Report	Mitrović 32'; S. Al-Dawsari 41', 59', 78'; Kanno (yellow card) 63'; Malcom 66'; Al-Tombakti (yellow card) 90+5'	Stadium: King Abdullah Sports City; Attendance: 7,387; Referee: Donatas Rumšas (Lithuania)

12 May 2025 31	Al-Hilal	4–0	Al-Orobah	Riyadh
19:05	Mitrović 28'; S. Al-Dawsari 65'; Kaio 90' (pen.), 90+2'	Report	Abu Taha (yellow card) 3'; I. Al-Zubaidi (red card) 47'	Stadium: Kingdom Arena; Attendance: 9,118; Referee: Erik Lambrechts (Belgium)

16 May 2025 32	Al-Fateh	3–4	Al-Hilal	Al-Hasa
18:55	Bendebka 15', 24'; Qassem (yellow card) 18'; Saâdane (yellow card) 77'; Batna 82', (yellow card) 87'; Al-Othman (yellow card) 90+17'	Report	N. Al-Dawsari 50'; S. Al-Dawsari 60'; Mitrović 85', 90+2'; Neves (yellow card) 90+9'; Al-Tombakti (yellow card) 90+13'	Stadium: Al-Fateh Club Stadium; Attendance: 8,318; Referee: Mario Escobar (Guatemala)

21 May 2025 33	Al-Wehda	1–1	Al-Hilal	Jeddah
21:00	Al-Hejji (yellow card) 22'; Al-Alaeli (yellow card) 45+1'; Noor 51'; Al Makahasi (yellow card) 89'; Al-Rashidi (yellow card) 90+1'	Report	S. Al-Dawsari (yellow card) 42'; Neves (yellow card) 83'; Milinković-Savić 90+2'	Stadium: Prince Abdullah Al-Faisal Sports City; Attendance: 9,493; Referee: Jesús Valenzuela (Venezuela)

26 May 2025 34	Al-Hilal	2–0	Al-Qadsiah	Riyadh
21:00	Mitrović 25' (pen.); Milinković-Savić 69'; K. Al-Dawsari (yellow card) 72'	Report		Stadium: Kingdom Arena; Attendance: 20,883; Referee: Harm Osmers (Germany)

=== King Cup ===
All times are local, AST (UTC+3).

24 September 2024 Round of 32	Al-Bukiryah	0–1	Al-Hilal	Buraidah
18:35	Al-Sonaitan (yellow card) 40'; Asiri (yellow card) 90+4'; Kaabi (yellow card) 90+6'	Report	Marcos Leonardo 41' (pen.), (yellow card) 61'	Stadium: King Abdullah Sports City; Attendance: 6,313; Referee: Sebastián Zunino (Argentina)

29 October 2024 Round of 16	Al-Tai	1–4	Al-Hilal	Haʼil
18:05	Al-Juwaid (yellow card) 3', (goal) 7'; Qassem (yellow card) 47'	Report	Al-Hamdan 5', 49'; Al-Ghannam 38'; Marcos Leonardo 53'	Stadium: Prince Abdulaziz bin Musa'ed Sports City; Attendance: 8,295; Referee: Anastasios Papapetrou (Greece)

7 January 2025 Quarter-finals	Al-Hilal	2–2 (a.e.t.) (1–3 p)	Al-Ittihad	Riyadh
20:30	Neves (yellow card) 34'; Koulibaly (yellow card) 54'; Al-Dawsari 72'; Marcos Leonardo 101'	Report	Mitaj (yellow card) 32'; Kanté (yellow card) 51'; Benzema 63', 114'; Aouar (yellow card) 65'	Stadium: Kingdom Arena; Attendance: 25,129; Referee: Jesús Valenzuela (Venezuela)
	Penalties
	Kanno (penalty missed); Marcos Leonardo (penalty missed); Milinković-Savić (penalty scored); Malcom (penalty missed)		(penalty scored) Benzema; (penalty scored) Fabinho; (penalty scored) Pereira

=== Super Cup ===
13 August 2024 Semi-finals	Al-Hilal	1–1 (4–1 p)	Al-Ahli	Abha, Saudi Arabia
19:15 UTC+3	Al-Hamdan (yellow card) 77'; Mitrović 90+1'	Report	Majrashi (yellow card) 10'; Firmino 66'; Veiga (yellow card) 80'; Mendy (yellow card) 88'; Kessié (yellow card) 90+3'	Stadium: Prince Sultan bin Abdulaziz Sports City; Attendance: 12,200; Referee: Clément Turpin (France)
	Penalties
	Neves (penalty scored); S. Al-Dawsari (penalty scored); Mitrović (penalty scored); Milinković-Savić (penalty scored)		(penalty scored) Firmino; (penalty missed) Veiga; (penalty missed) Ibañez

17 August 2024 Final	Al-Nassr	1–4	Al-Hilal	Abha, Saudi Arabia
19:15 UTC+3	Otávio (yellow card) 34'; Ronaldo 44'; Al-Ghannam (yellow card) 87'	Report	Al-Tombakti (yellow card) 12'; Malcom (yellow card) 28', (goal) 72'; Milinković-Savić 55'; Mitrović 63', 69'; S. Al-Dawsari (yellow card) 77'	Stadium: Prince Sultan bin Abdulaziz Sports City; Attendance: 14,357; Referee: Artur Soares Dias (Portugal)

=== AFC Champions League Elite ===
==== League stage ====
Pos	Team	Pld	W	D	L	GF	GA	GD	Pts	Qualification
1	(Saudi Arabia) Al-Hilal	8	7	1	0	26	7	+19	22	Advance to round of 16
2	(Saudi Arabia) Al-Ahli	8	7	1	0	21	8	+13	22	Advance to round of 16
3	(Saudi Arabia) Al-Nassr	8	5	2	1	17	6	+11	17	Advance to round of 16
4	(Qatar) Al-Sadd	8	3	3	2	10	9	+1	12	Advance to round of 16
5	(United Arab Emirates) Al Wasl	8	3	2	3	8	12	−4	11	Advance to round of 16
6	(Iran) Esteghlal	8	2	3	3	8	9	−1	9	Advance to round of 16
7	(Qatar) Al-Rayyan	8	2	2	4	8	12	−4	8	Advance to round of 16
8	(Uzbekistan) Pakhtakor	8	1	4	3	4	6	−2	7	Advance to round of 16
9	(Iran) Persepolis	8	1	4	3	6	10	−4	7	
10	(Qatar) Al-Gharafa	8	2	1	5	10	18	−8	7	
11	(Iraq) Al-Shorta	8	1	3	4	7	17	−10	6	
12	(United Arab Emirates) Al Ain	8	0	2	6	11	22	−11	2	

Source: Asian Football Confederation
Rules for classification: 1) points; 2) goal difference; 3) number of goals scored; 4) number of matches won; 5) penalty shoot-out if only two teams remain tied and played each other on the final matchday 6) fair play ranking; 7) drawing of lots

17 September 2024 1	Al-Rayyan (Qatar)	1–3	(Saudi Arabia) Al-Hilal	Al Rayyan, Qatar
19:00 UTC+3	Shehata (yellow card) 24'; Guedes 47'	Report	Milinković-Savić 15', (yellow card) 90'; Cancelo 42'; Marcos Leonardo 44'	Stadium: Ahmad bin Ali Stadium; Attendance: 23,471; Referee: Kim Jong-hyeok (South Korea)

1 October 2024 2	Al-Hilal (Saudi Arabia)	5–0	(Iraq) Al-Shorta	Riyadh, Saudi Arabia
21:00 UTC+3	Marcos Leonardo 11'; Mitrović 15'; S. Al-Dawsari 47'; N. Al-Dawsari 73'; Kanno 90+5'	Report	Ali (yellow card) 44'	Stadium: Prince Faisal bin Fahd Sports City; Attendance: 12,434; Referee: Qasim Al-Hatmi (Oman)

21 October 2024 3	Al Ain (United Arab Emirates)	4–5	(Saudi Arabia) Al-Hilal	Al Ain, United Arab Emirates
20:00 UTC+4	Rahimi 39', 67', 90+6' (pen.); Sanabria 63'; Palacios (yellow card) 90+2'	Report	Koulibaly (yellow card) 20'; Lodi 26'; Milinković-Savić 45+2'; S. Al-Dawsari 45+5', 65', 75'; Al-Bulaihi (red card) 82'; Cancelo (yellow card) 90+10'; K. Al-Dawsari (yellow card) 90+13'	Stadium: Hazza bin Zayed Stadium; Attendance: 24,126; Referee: Nazmi Nasaruddin (Malaysia)

4 November 2024 4	Al-Hilal (Saudi Arabia)	3–0	(Iran) Esteghlal	Riyadh, Saudi Arabia
21:00 UTC+3	Mitrović 15', 33', 74'	Report	Cheshmi (yellow card) 63'; Zamani (yellow card) 76'	Stadium: Kingdom Arena; Attendance: 17,840; Referee: Ko Hyung-jin (South Korea)

26 November 2024 5	Al-Sadd (Qatar)	1–1	(Saudi Arabia) Al-Hilal	Doha, Qatar
19:00 UTC+3	Afif (yellow card) 45+5'; Otávio 71'	Report	Al-Bulaihi 10'; N. Al-Dawsari (yellow card) 16'	Stadium: Jassim bin Hamad Stadium; Attendance: 11,327; Referee: Kim Jong-hyeok (South Korea)

3 December 2024 6	Al-Hilal (Saudi Arabia)	3–0	(Qatar) Al-Gharafa	Riyadh, Saudi Arabia
21:00 UTC+3	Marcos Leonardo 18'; Mitrović 82'; Milinković-Savić 85'	Report	Sassi (yellow card) 65'; Díaz (yellow card) 77'	Stadium: Kingdom Arena; Attendance: 18,344; Referee: Adham Makhadmeh (Jordan)

4 February 2025 7	Al-Hilal (Saudi Arabia)	4–1	(Iran) Persepolis	Riyadh, Saudi Arabia
21:00 UTC+3	Malcom 10'; Cancelo 25'; S. Al-Dawsari 38', 45+1'	Report	Gvelesiani 90' (pen.)	Stadium: Kingdom Arena; Attendance: 24,460; Referee: Ma Ning (China)

18 February 2025 8	Al Wasl (United Arab Emirates)	0–2	(Saudi Arabia) Al-Hilal	Dubai, United Arab Emirates
20:00 UTC+4	Saleh (yellow card) 23'; Pérez (yellow card) 32'; Al-Azizi (yellow card) 90+6'	Report	Marcos Leonardo 13'; Koulibaly (yellow card) 26'; Al-Bulaihi (yellow card) 35'; S. Al-Dawsari 49'; Cancelo (yellow card) 67'	Stadium: Zabeel Stadium; Attendance: 5,414; Referee: Ahmad Al-Ali (Kuwait)

==== Knockout stage ====
===== Round of 16 =====
4 March 2025 Round of 16; First leg	Pakhtakor (Uzbekistan)	1–0	(Saudi Arabia) Al-Hilal	Tashkent, Uzbekistan
21:00 UTC+5	Flamarion 29'; Azmiddinov (yellow card) 34'; Abdullaev (yellow card) 78'; Makhamadzhonov (yellow card) 90+7'	Report	Koulibaly (yellow card) 83'; Kanno (yellow card) 90+9'	Stadium: JAR Stadium; Attendance: 5,226; Referee: Ma Ning (China)

11 March 2025 Round of 16; Second leg	Al-Hilal (Saudi Arabia)	4–0 (4–1 agg.)	(Uzbekistan) Pakhtakor	Riyadh, Saudi Arabia
23:00 UTC+3	Al-Yami 30'; Malcom 42'; N. Al-Dawsari 51' (pen.); Al-Harbi (yellow card) 59'; Al-Ghannam (yellow card) 88'; S. Al-Dawsari 90+2'	Report	Khamdamov (yellow card) 36'	Stadium: Kingdom Arena; Attendance: 24,316; Referee: Adham Makhadmeh (Jordan)

===== Finals =====
25 April 2025 Quarter-finals	Al-Hilal (Saudi Arabia)	7–0	(South Korea) Gwangju	Jeddah, Saudi Arabia
19:30 UTC+3	Milinković-Savić 6'; Marcos Leonardo 25'; S. Al-Dawsari 33'; Mitrović 55'; Malcom 79'; N. Al-Dawsari 84'; Al-Hamdan 86'	Report	Kim Jin-ho (yellow card) 72'	Stadium: King Abdullah Sports City; Attendance: 48,713; Referee: Ahmed Al-Ali (Kuwait)

29 April 2025 Semi-finals	Al-Hilal (Saudi Arabia)	1–3	(Saudi Arabia) Al-Ahli	Jeddah, Saudi Arabia
19:30 UTC+3	S. Al-Dawsari 42', (yellow card) 80'; Koulibaly (yellow card) 45+9' (yellow-red card) 59'; Mitrović (yellow card) 78'; Al-Yami (yellow card) 84'; Neves (yellow card) 87'; Bounou (yellow card) 90+10'	Report	Alioski (yellow card) 1'; Majrashi (yellow card) 6'; Firmino 9'; Toney 27'; Demiral (yellow card) 45+6'; Al-Buraikan 90+8'; Galeno (yellow card) 90+10'	Stadium: King Abdullah Sports City; Attendance: 50,613; Referee: Adham Makhadmeh (Jordan)

=== FIFA Club World Cup ===
==== Group stage ====
The draw for the group stage was held on 5 December 2024.

Pos	Team	Pld	W	D	L	GF	GA	GD	Pts	Qualification
1	(Spain) Real Madrid	3	2	1	0	7	2	+5	7	Advance to knockout stage
2	(Saudi Arabia) Al Hilal	3	1	2	0	3	1	+2	5	Advance to knockout stage
3	(Austria) Red Bull Salzburg	3	1	1	1	2	4	−2	4	
4	(Mexico) Pachuca	3	0	0	3	2	7	−5	0	

Source: FIFA
Rules for classification: Group stage tiebreakers

18 June 2025 Group	Real Madrid (Spain)	1–1	(Saudi Arabia) Al-Hilal	Miami Gardens, United States
15:00 EDT (UTC−4)	Vinícius (yellow card) 15'; G. García 34'	Report	Neves 41' (pen.), (yellow card) 89'; Al-Qahtani (yellow card) 90+1'; Al-Harbi (yellow card) 90+9'	Stadium: Hard Rock Stadium; Attendance: 62,415; Referee: Facundo Tello (Argentina)

22 June 2025 Group	Red Bull Salzburg (Austria)	0–0	(Saudi Arabia) Al-Hilal	Washington, D.C., United States
18:00 EDT (UTC−4)	Diabate (yellow card) 36'; Kitano (yellow card) 85'	Report		Stadium: Audi Field; Attendance: 16,167; Referee: Wilton Sampaio (Brazil)

26 June 2025 Group	Al-Hilal (Saudi Arabia)	2–0	(Mexico) Pachuca	Nashville, United States
20:00 CDT (UTC−5)	S. Al-Dawsari 22'; Lodi (yellow card) 45+4'; Koulibaly (yellow card) 52'; Marcos Leonardo 90+5'	Report	Barreto (yellow card) 17'; Domínguez (yellow card) 45+1'	Stadium: Geodis Park; Attendance: 14,147; Referee: Danny Makkelie (Netherlands)

==== Knockout stage ====
30 June 2025 Round of 16	Manchester City (England)	3–4 (a.e.t.)	(Saudi Arabia) Al-Hilal	Orlando, United States
21:00 EDT	Silva 9'; Gvardiol (yellow card) 27'; Nunes (yellow card) 39'; Haaland 55'; Foden 104'; Akanji (yellow card) 105+1'	Report	Marcos Leonardo 46', 112', (yellow card) 113'; Malcom 52'; Koulibaly 94'	Stadium: Camping World Stadium; Attendance: 42,311; Referee: Jesús Valenzuela (Venezuela)

4 July 2025 Quarter-finals	Fluminense (Brazil)	2–1	(Saudi Arabia) Al-Hilal	Orlando, United States
15:00 EDT	Freytes (yellow card) 36'; Martinelli 40', (yellow card) 43'; Thiago Silva (yellow card) 64'; Hércules 70'	Report	Milinković-Savić (yellow card) 10'; Lodi (yellow card) 21'; Marcos Leonardo 51'; Neves (yellow card) 90'; Koulibaly (yellow card) 90+7'	Stadium: Camping World Stadium; Attendance: 43,091; Referee: Danny Makkelie (Netherlands)

== Statistics ==
=== Appearances ===
Last updated on 4 July 2025.

No.	Pos	Nat	Player	Total		Pro League		King's Cup		ACL Elite		Super Cup		Club World Cup	
No.	Pos	Nat	Player	Apps	Goals	Apps	Goals	Apps	Goals	Apps	Goals	Apps	Goals	Apps	Goals
Goalkeepers
17	GK	(Saudi Arabia) KSA	Mohammed Al-Rubaie	4	0	2	0	1	0	1	0	0	0	0	0
21	GK	(Saudi Arabia) KSA	Mohammed Al-Owais	3	0	1	0	1	0	1	0	0	0	0	0
37	GK	(Morocco) MAR	Yassine Bounou	49	0	31	0	1	0	10	0	2	0	5	0
40	GK	(Saudi Arabia) KSA	Ahmed Abu Rasen	0	0	0	0	0	0	0	0	0	0	0	0
50	GK	(Saudi Arabia) KSA	Abdulelah Al-Ghamdi	0	0	0	0	0	0	0	0	0	0	0	0
Defenders
3	DF	(Senegal) SEN	Kalidou Koulibaly	50	3	30	2	2	0	12	0	1	0	5	1
4	DF	(Saudi Arabia) KSA	Khalifah Al-Dawsari	13	0	4+5	0	0	0	1+2	0	1	0	0	0
5	DF	(Saudi Arabia) KSA	Ali Al-Bulaihi	40	5	26	4	3	0	7+2	1	0	0	0+2	0
6	DF	(Brazil) BRA	Renan Lodi	42	4	24	3	1+1	0	7+2	1	2	0	5	0
12	DF	(Saudi Arabia) KSA	Yasser Al-Shahrani	20	0	5+6	0	1+1	0	2+3	0	0+2	0	0	0
16	DF	(Saudi Arabia) KSA	Nasser Al-Dawsari	50	4	8+23	1	2+1	0	6+5	3	0	0	5	0
20	DF	(Portugal) POR	João Cancelo	39	2	21+1	0	2+1	0	8+1	2	0	0	5	0
24	DF	(Saudi Arabia) KSA	Moteb Al-Harbi	36	0	9+13	0	1+1	0	3+4	0	0	0	2+3	0
33	DF	(Saudi Arabia) KSA	Mohammed Al-Muhaysh	0	0	0	0	0	0	0	0	0	0	0	0
34	DF	(Saudi Arabia) KSA	Saleh Barnawi	0	0	0	0	0	0	0	0	0	0	0	0
78	DF	(Saudi Arabia) KSA	Ali Lajami	3	0	0	0	0	0	0	0	0	0	0+3	0
87	DF	(Saudi Arabia) KSA	Hassan Al-Tambakti	37	0	13+9	0	1	0	6+3	0	2	0	3	0
88	DF	(Saudi Arabia) KSA	Hamad Al-Yami	33	1	6+15	0	1+2	0	1+2	1	1	0	0+5	0
Midfielders
7	MF	(Saudi Arabia) KSA	Khalid Al-Ghannam	16	1	0+11	0	2	1	0+2	0	0	0	0+1	0
8	MF	(Portugal) POR	Rúben Neves	43	2	26	1	1	0	8+1	0	2	0	5	1
15	MF	(Saudi Arabia) KSA	Mohammed Al-Qahtani	30	2	8+13	2	2	0	0+5	0	0+1	0	0+1	0
18	MF	(Saudi Arabia) KSA	Musab Al-Juwayr	7	1	0+2	1	0	0	0	0	0	0	0+5	0
22	MF	(Serbia) SRB	Sergej Milinković-Savić	52	17	31	12	2+1	0	9+2	4	2	1	5	0
27	MF	(Brazil) BRA	Kaio César	21	3	10+3	3	0	0	4+2	0	0	0	0+2	0
28	MF	(Saudi Arabia) KSA	Mohamed Kanno	47	3	13+16	2	1+1	0	4+6	1	0+1	0	2+3	0
29	MF	(Saudi Arabia) KSA	Salem Al-Dawsari	51	27	32	15	1+1	1	12	10	2	0	3	1
Forwards
9	FW	(Serbia) SRB	Aleksandar Mitrović	36	28	21+2	19	1+2	0	7+1	6	2	3	0	0
10	FW	(Morocco) MAR	Abderrazak Hamdallah	1	0	0	0	0	0	0	0	0	0	0+1	0
11	FW	(Brazil) BRA	Marcos Leonardo	43	29	21+3	17	2+1	3	10+1	5	0	0	5	4
38	FW	(Saudi Arabia) KSA	Turki Al-Ghumail	1	0	0+1	0	0	0	0	0	0	0	0	0
39	FW	(Saudi Arabia) KSA	Abdulaziz Hadhood	1	0	0+1	0	0	0	0	0	0	0	0	0
77	FW	(Brazil) BRA	Malcom	49	14	30	9	1+1	0	10+1	3	1	1	5	1
99	FW	(Saudi Arabia) KSA	Abdullah Al-Hamdan	30	5	2+15	2	3	2	3+6	1	0+1	0	0	0
Players sent out on loan this season
20	FW	(Saudi Arabia) KSA	Abdullah Radif	0	0	0	0	0	0	0	0	0	0	0	0
Player who made an appearance this season but left the club
2	DF	(Saudi Arabia) KSA	Mohammed Al-Breik	2	0	0+2	0	0	0	0	0	0	0	0	0
10	FW	(Brazil) BRA	Neymar	2	0	0	0	0	0	0+2	0	0	0	0	0
66	DF	(Saudi Arabia) KSA	Saud Abdulhamid	2	0	0	0	0	0	0	0	1+1	0	0	0
96	MF	(Brazil) BRA	Michael	2	0	0	0	0	0	0	0	2	0	0	0

=== Goalscorers ===
Rank	No.	Pos	Nat.	Player	Pro League	King's Cup	Champions League	Super Cup	Club World Cup	Total
1	11	FW	(Brazil)	Marcos Leonardo	17	3	5	0	4	29
2	9	FW	(Serbia)	Aleksandar Mitrović	19	0	6	3	0	28
3	29	MF	(Saudi Arabia)	Salem Al-Dawsari	15	1	10	0	1	27
4	22	MF	(Serbia)	Sergej Milinković-Savić	12	0	4	1	0	17
5	77	FW	(Brazil)	Malcom	9	0	3	1	1	14
6	5	DF	(Saudi Arabia)	Ali Al-Bulaihi	4	0	1	0	0	5
6	99	FW	(Saudi Arabia)	Abdullah Al-Hamdan	2	2	1	0	0	5
8	6	DF	(Brazil)	Renan Lodi	3	0	1	0	0	4
8	16	DF	(Saudi Arabia)	Nasser Al-Dawsari	1	0	3	0	0	4
10	3	DF	(Senegal)	Kalidou Koulibaly	2	0	0	0	1	3
10	27	MF	(Brazil)	Kaio César	3	0	0	0	0	3
10	28	MF	(Saudi Arabia)	Mohamed Kanno	2	0	1	0	0	3
13	8	MF	(Portugal)	Rúben Neves	1	0	0	0	1	2
13	15	MF	(Saudi Arabia)	Mohammed Al-Qahtani	2	0	0	0	0	2
13	20	DF	(Portugal)	João Cancelo	0	0	2	0	0	2
16	7	MF	(Saudi Arabia)	Khalid Al-Ghannam	0	1	0	0	0	1
16	18	MF	(Saudi Arabia)	Musab Al-Juwayr	1	0	0	0	0	1
16	88	DF	(Saudi Arabia)	Hamad Al-Yami	0	0	1	0	0	1
Own goals					2	0	0	0	0	2
Totals					95	7	38	5	8	153

Last updated: 4 July 2025

=== Assists ===
Rank	No.	Pos.	Nat.	Player	Pro League	King's Cup	Champions League	Super Cup	Club World Cup	Total
1	29	MF	(Saudi Arabia)	Salem Al-Dawsari	15	0	2	1	0	18
2	77	FW	(Brazil)	Malcom	10	0	6	1	0	17
3	8	MF	(Portugal)	Rúben Neves	8	0	1	1	2	12
3	20	DF	(Portugal)	João Cancelo	6	0	5	0	1	12
5	6	DF	(Brazil)	Renan Lodi	7	0	1	0	0	8
5	22	MF	(Serbia)	Sergej Milinković-Savić	6	0	2	0	0	8
7	9	FW	(Serbia)	Aleksandar Mitrović	2	0	4	1	0	7
7	28	MF	(Saudi Arabia)	Mohamed Kanno	2	0	5	0	0	7
9	99	FW	(Saudi Arabia)	Abdullah Al-Hamdan	4	0	2	0	0	6
10	16	DF	(Saudi Arabia)	Nasser Al-Dawsari	1	1	2	0	1	5
11	11	FW	(Brazil)	Marcos Leonardo	2	0	2	0	0	4
12	24	DF	(Saudi Arabia)	Moteb Al-Harbi	1	2	0	0	0	3
12	27	MF	(Brazil)	Kaio César	3	0	0	0	0	3
14	15	MF	(Saudi Arabia)	Mohammed Al-Qahtani	0	1	1	0	0	2
14	87	DF	(Saudi Arabia)	Hassan Al-Tambakti	1	1	0	0	0	2
16	3	DF	(Senegal)	Kalidou Koulibaly	0	0	0	0	1	1
16	12	DF	(Saudi Arabia)	Yasser Al-Shahrani	0	0	1	0	0	1
16	18	MF	(Saudi Arabia)	Musab Al-Juwayr	1	0	0	0	0	1
16	88	DF	(Saudi Arabia)	Hamad Al-Yami	1	0	0	0	0	1
Totals					70	5	34	4	5	118

Last updated: 4 July 2025

=== Clean sheets ===
Rank	No.	Pos.	Nat.	Player	Pro League	King's Cup	Champions League	Arab Club Champions Cup	Super Cup	Total
1	37	GK	(Morocco)	Yassine Bounou	9	0	5	0	2	16
2	21	GK	(Saudi Arabia)	Mohammed Al-Owais	1	1	1	0	0	3
3	17	GK	(Saudi Arabia)	Mohammed Al-Rubaie	2	0	0	0	0	2
Totals					12	1	6	0	2	21

Last updated: 26 June 2025
