= Serrana, São Paulo =

Serrana
- Municipality
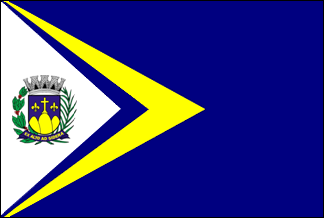
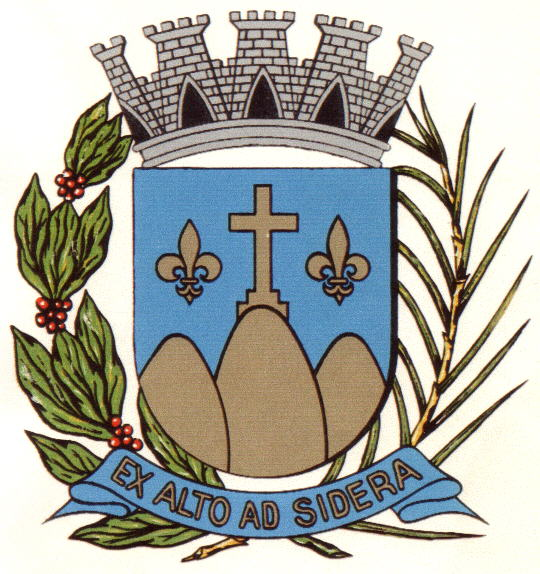
- Flag Coat of arms

- Location in São Paulo state

- Location in Brazil
- Coordinates: 21°12′41″S 47°35′44″W
- Country: Brazil
- Region: Southeast
- State: São Paulo

Area
  - Total: 126 km^{2} (49 sq mi)

Population (2020)
  - Total: 45,644
  - Density: 362/km^{2} (938/sq mi)
- Time zone: UTC−3 (BRT)

Serrana is a municipality in the state of São Paulo in Brazil. The population is 45,644 (2020 est.) in an area of 126 km^{2}. The elevation is 427 m.

== History ==
The municipality was created by state law in 1948.

Map of the state of São Paulo (1948).

=== COVID-19 vaccine study ===
While other communities were struggling to deal with the COVID-19 pandemic in Brazil, Serrana participated in a study wherein 100% of its adult population was supposed to be vaccinated with CoronaVac. Prior to the mass vaccination, 5% of Serrana's population had been infected, one of the highest rates in Brazil.

Most adults received two shots by the end of April. By May, symptomatic COVID-19 cases fell 80%, hospitalizations by 86%, and mortality by 95% according to researchers doing the study. The virus was contained once 75% of people were vaccinated. According to Ricardo Palacios, a director at São Paulo's Instituto Butantan, "The most important result was understanding that we can control the pandemic even without vaccinating the entire population."

== Media ==
In telecommunications, the city was served by Companhia Telefônica Brasileira until 1973, when it began to be served by Telecomunicações de São Paulo. In July 1998, this company was acquired by Telefónica, which adopted the Vivo brand in 2012.

The company is currently an operator of cell phones, fixed lines, internet (fiber optics/4G) and television (satellite and cable).

== Notable people ==
- Renan Lodi (born 1998), professional footballer

== See also ==
- List of municipalities in São Paulo
- Interior of São Paulo
