= Marcos Leonardo =

Brazilian footballer (born 2003)

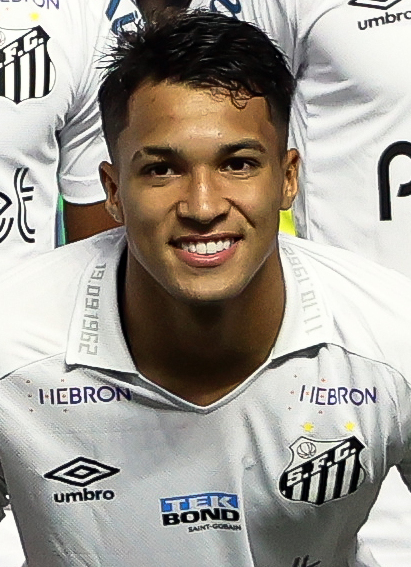
- Marcos Leonardo with Santos in 2022

Personal information
- Full name: Marcos Leonardo Santos Almeida
- Date of birth: 2 May 2003 (age 23)
- Place of birth: Itapetinga, Brazil
- Height: 1.77 m (5 ft 10 in)
- Position: Striker

Team information
- Current team: Ajax
- Number: 38

Youth career
- 2014–2020: Santos

Senior career*
Years	Team	Apps	(Gls)
2020–2024	Santos	130	(43)
2024	Benfica	17	(8)
2024–2026	Al-Hilal	51	(30)
2026–	Ajax	15	(2)

International career^{‡}
2019	Brazil U16	5	(2)
2021–2023	Brazil U20	13	(15)
- * Club domestic league appearances and goals as of 18:42, 18 October 2026 (UTC) ‡ National team caps and goals as of 16:42, 12 June 2023 (UTC)

Marcos Leonardo Santos Almeida (born 2 May 2003), known as Marcos Leonardo (Brazilian Portuguese: [ˈmaʁkuz leoˈnaʁdu]), is a Brazilian professional footballer who plays as a striker for Eredivisie club Ajax. He previously played for Santos, Benfica, and Al-Hilal.

== Club career ==
=== Santos ===
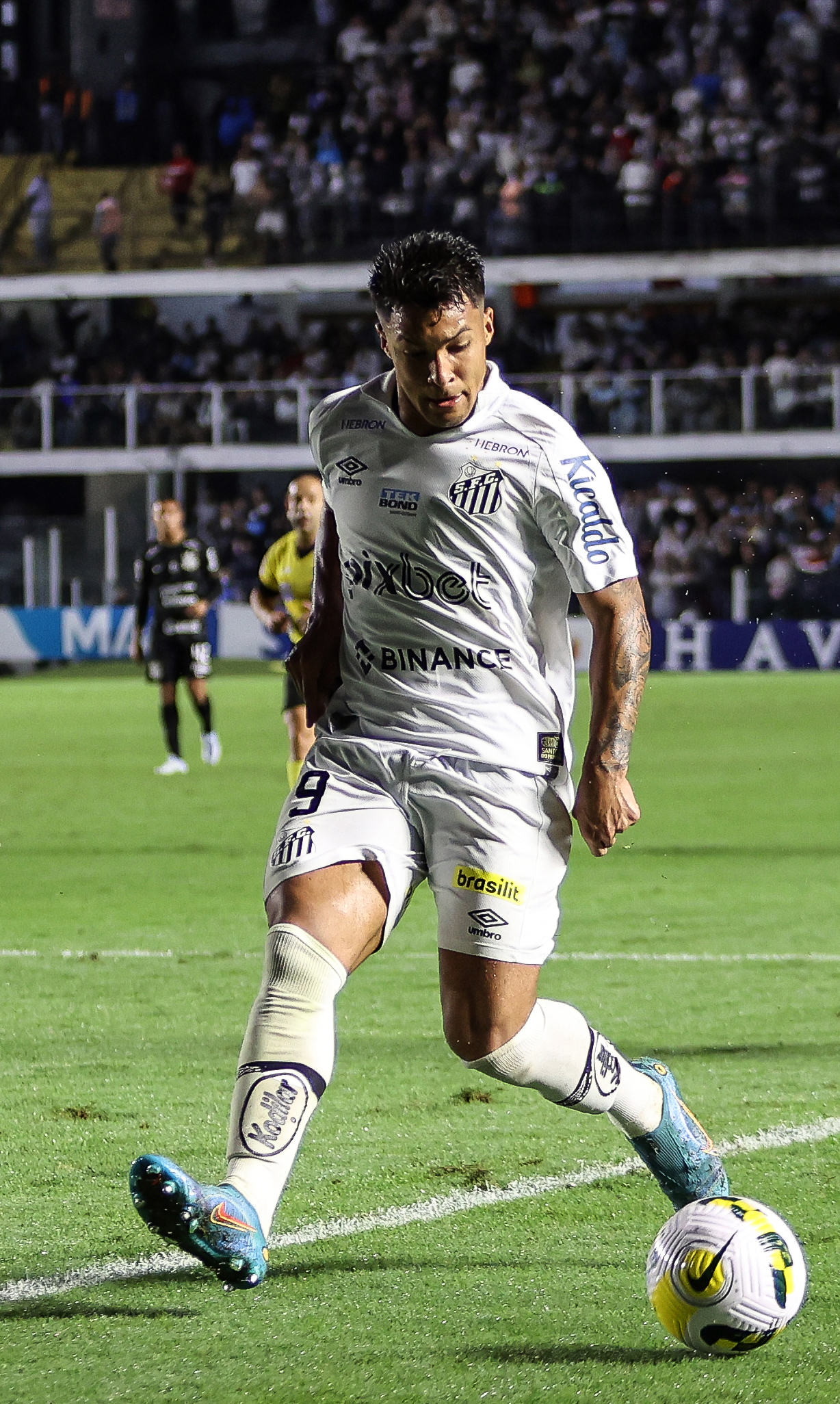
Marcos Leonardo with Santos in 2022

Born in Itapetinga, Bahia, Marcos Leonardo moved to Taubaté, São Paulo in May 2014, and joined Santos' youth setup in August, after a trial. On 23 October 2019, he signed his first professional contract with the club, agreeing to a three-year deal.

On 21 July 2020, Marcos Leonardo was one of the five youth graduates registered for the year's Campeonato Paulista. He made his professional – and Série A – debut on 20 August, coming on as a second-half substitute for Yeferson Soteldo in a 1–0 away win against Sport Recife.

On 15 September 2020, Marcos Leonardo made his Copa Libertadores debut by replacing Raniel in a 0–0 home draw against Club Olimpia. He scored his first professional goal on 4 October, netting his team's third in a 3–2 away win against Goiás.

On 20 October 2020, Marcos Leonardo scored the winner in a 2–1 home success over Defensa y Justicia, becoming the sixth-youngest to score in the Libertadores, and the fourth-youngest Brazilian. He spent the 2021 campaign as a backup option, initially behind fellow youth graduate Kaio Jorge and subsequently behind new signing Léo Baptistão.

On 15 January 2022, Marcos Leonardo agreed to renew his contract with Santos until 2026. He became an undisputed starter, and started to score regularly for the club in the following years, becoming one of the 50 top goalscorers of their history after a winning goal against Palmeiras on 8 October 2023.

=== Benfica ===
On 5 January 2024, Marcos Leonardo moved to Portugal, signing a five-and-a-half-year contract with Primeira Liga club Benfica, for a reported transfer fee of €18 million, with Santos having the right to 10% of the profit the Lisbon-based club receive from a future transfer. His release clause was set at €150 million.

On each of his first three league games for Benfica, against Rio Ave, Boavista and Estrela da Amadora, Marcos Leonardo came on as a substitute during the second half and scored, helping seal 4–1, 2–0 and 4–1 victories, respectively. On 15 February 2024, he made his UEFA Europa League debut, coming off the bench to replace Arthur Cabral in the final minutes of a knockout round play-off match at home to Toulouse; he won a penalty that Ángel Di María converted, allowing Benfica to win by 2–1.

=== Al Hilal ===
On 2 September 2024, Marcos Leonardo joined Saudi Pro League club Al Hilal on a five-year contract.

On 30 June 2025, in the round of 16 of the 2025 FIFA Club World Cup, Leonardo scored twice, including the winning goal in extra-time as Al Hilal defeated Manchester City 4–3 to advance to the quarter-finals.

On 2 February 2026, Atletico Madrid agreed a loan with an option to sign him in the summer for €40 million, as Leonardo was keen on impressing Carlo Ancelotti before the World Cup in the Summer. However Al Hilal reportedly pulled the plug on the deal as Karim Benzema's signing was in doubt.

=== Ajax ===
On 17 July 2026, Eredivisie club Ajax announced the signing of Marcos Leonardo on a contract until 2031 for a transfer fee of just under €20 million.

== International career ==
Marcos Leonardo represented Brazil at under-17 level, playing in the 2019 Montaigu Tournament and UEFA Development Tournament. On 12 February 2021, he and Santos teammate Renyer were called up to the under-18s.

== Personal life ==
Marcos Leonardo's father, known as Marcos Coringa, was also a footballer. He played as a forward and appeared in amateur tournaments in his native Bahia.

== Career statistics ==
As of match played 22 October 2026

Appearances and goals by club, season and competition
Club	Season	League			State league (Note: Includes Campeonato Paulista)		National cup (Note: Includes Copa do Brasil, Taça de Portugal, King's Cup, KNVB Cup)		League cup (Note: Includes Taça da Liga)		Continental		Other		Total	
Club	Season	Division	Apps	Goals	Apps	Goals	Apps	Goals	Apps	Goals	Apps	Goals	Apps	Goals	Apps	Goals
Santos	2020	Série A	18	4	0	0	1	0	—		3 (Note: Appearances in Copa Libertadores)	1	—		22	5
Santos	2021	Série A	16	5	7	0	6	1	—		11 (Note: Nine appearances and one goal in Copa Libertadores, two appearances in Copa Sudamericana)	1	—		40	7
Santos	2022	Série A	35	13	12	4	6	2	—		4 (Note: Appearances in Copa Sudamericana)	2	—		57	21
Santos	2023	Série A	31	13	11	4	4	3	—		3	1	—		49	21
Santos	Total		100	35	30	8	17	6	—		21	5	—		168	54
Benfica	2023–24	Primeira Liga	14	7	—		2	0	1	0	4 (Note: Appearance in UEFA Europa League)	0	—		21	7
Benfica	2024–25	Primeira Liga	3	1	—		—		—		—		—		3	1
Benfica	Total		17	8	—		2	0	1	0	4	0	—		24	8
Al-Hilal	2024–25	Saudi Pro League	24	17	—		3	3	—		11 (Note: Appearances in AFC Champions League Elite)	5	5 (Note: Appearances in FIFA Club World Cup)	4	43	29
Al-Hilal	2025–26	Saudi Pro League	27	13	—		5	2	—		7	4	—		39	19
Al-Hilal	Total		51	30	—		8	5	—		18	9	5	4	82	48
Ajax	2026–27	Eredivisie	6	1	—		0	0	—		7 (Note: Appearances in UEFA Conference League)	1	—		13	2
Career total			174	74	30	8	27	11	1	0	50	15	5	4	287	112

== Honours ==
Al-Hilal

- King's Cup: 2025–26

Individual

- FIFA U-20 World Cup Silver Boot: 2023
- Saudi Pro League Player of the Month: January 2025
