= Ali Al-Bulaihi =

Saudi Arabian footballer (born 1991)

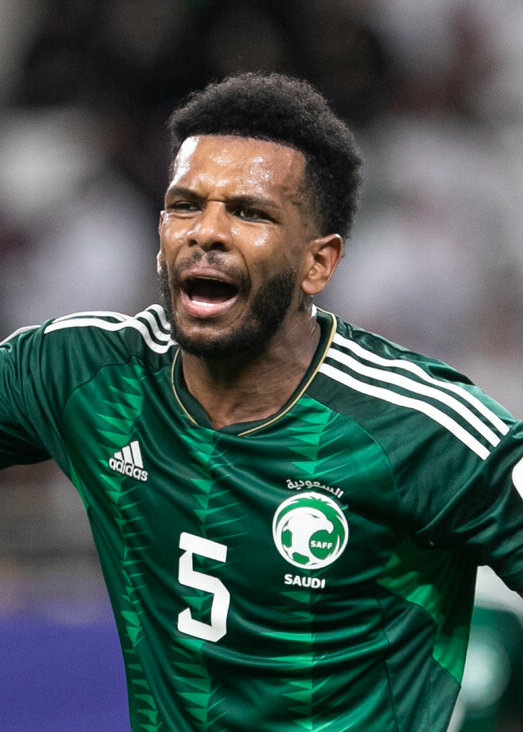
- Al-Bulaihi with Saudi Arabia at the 2023 AFC Asian Cup

Personal information
- Full name: Ali Hadi Mohammed Al-Bulaihi
- Date of birth: 21 November 1989 (age 36)
- Place of birth: Najran, Saudi Arabia
- Height: 1.82 m (6 ft 0 in)
- Position: Centre-back

Team information
- Current team: Al-Shabab
- Number: 55

Senior career*
Years	Team	Apps	(Gls)
2011–2014	Al-Amal		
2014–2015	Al-Nahda		
2015–2017	Al-Fateh	47	(1)
2017–2026	Al Hilal	165	(17)
2026	→ Al-Shabab (loan)	14	(2)
2026–	Al-Shabab	4	(2)

International career
2018–2024	Saudi Arabia	60	(2)
- * Club domestic league appearances and goals as of 30 October 2026

Ali Hadi Mohammed Al-Bulaihi (Arabic: عَلِيّ هَادِي مُحَمَّد الْبُلَيْهِيّ; born 21 November 1989) is a Saudi Arabian professional football player who plays as a centre-back for Saudi Pro League club Al-Shabab.

== Club career ==
Al-Bulaihi started his career at Al-Amal where he spent three years before joining Al-Nahda in 2014. On 23 July 2015, he joined Al-Fateh.

=== Al-Hilal ===
On 21 June 2017, Al-Hilal signed Al Bulaihi on a free transfer. He signed a three-year contract with the club.

In April 2024, in a derby match against rival team Al Nassr, he courted controversy after being elbowed by Cristiano Ronaldo following attempts to intimidate him, resulting in a red card for Ronaldo and a yellow card for Al-Bulaihi.

On 1 February 2026, Al-Bulaihi joined Al-Shabab on loan for six-month. On 30 August 2026, he departed Al-Hilal following a contractual settlement. Two days later, he returned to Al-Shabab, signing a one-year contract.

== International career ==
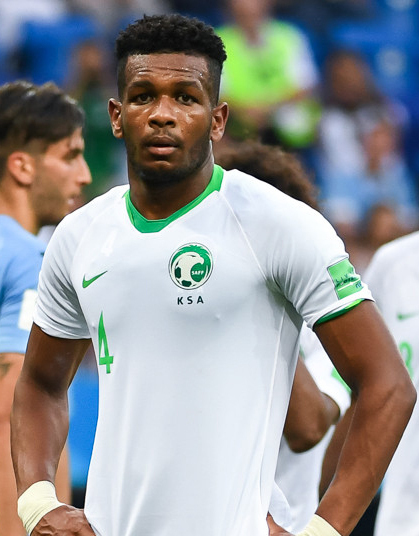
Al-Bulaihi with Saudi Arabia at the 2018 FIFA World Cup

In June 2018, Al-Bulaihi was named in Saudi Arabia's squad for the 2018 FIFA World Cup in Russia. He made his debut in the competition against Uruguay. In November 2022, he was called up for the 2022 FIFA World Cup in Qatar. In the opening game, he played the whole match as his team defeated the eventual world champions Argentina 2–1.

In January 2024, he drew criticism for shoving and grabbing the hair of South Korean player Son Heung-min, unprovoked, during the 2023 AFC Asian Cup round of 16. Al-Bulaihi had previously similarly taunted Argentine player Lionel Messi by slapping him on the back.

== Career statistics ==
=== Club ===
As of match played 4 July 2025

Club	Season	League			King's Cup		Asia		Other		Total	
Club	Season	Division	Apps	Goals	Apps	Goals	Apps	Goals	Apps	Goals	Apps	Goals
Al-Fateh	2015–16	Saudi Pro League	24	0	1	0	—		1 (Note: Appearance(s) in Saudi Crown Prince Cup)	0	26	0
Al-Fateh	2016–17	Saudi Pro League	23	1	2	0	6	0	2	1	33	2
Al-Fateh	Total		47	1	3	0	6	0	3	1	59	2
Al-Hilal	2017–18	Saudi Pro League	5	0	1	0	4 (Note: Appearances in AFC Champions League)	0	—		10	0
Al-Hilal	2018–19	Saudi Pro League	25	3	0	0	6	1	8 (Note: Six appearances in Arab Club Champions Cup, one appearance in Saudi Super Cup, one appearance in Saudi-Egyptian Super Cup)	0	39	4
Al-Hilal	2019–20	Saudi Pro League	14	2	6	0	11	1	3 (Note: Appearances in FIFA Club World Cup)	0	34	3
Al-Hilal	2020–21	Saudi Pro League	16	2	0	0	6	1	0	0	22	3
Al-Hilal	2021–22	Saudi Pro League	22	3	3	0	7	0	3 (Note: One appearance in Saudi Super Cup, two appearances in FIFA Club World Cup)	0	35	3
Al-Hilal	2022–23	Saudi Pro League	22	1	2	1	5	0	4 (Note: One appearance in Saudi Super Cup, three appearances in FIFA Club World Cup)	0	33	2
Al-Hilal	2023–24	Saudi Pro League	32	2	4	0	12	1	8 (Note: Six appearances in Arab Club Champions Cup, two appearances in Saudi Super Cup)	0	56	3
Al-Hilal	2024–25	Saudi Pro League	26	4	3	0	9 (Note: Appearances in AFC Champions League Elite)	1	2	0	40	5
Al-Hilal	Total		162	17	19	1	65	6	30	0	274	24
Career total			209	18	22	1	71	6	33	1	333	26

=== International ===
Statistics accurate as of match played 31 December 2024.

Saudi Arabia
Year	Apps	Goals
2018	11	0
2019	6	0
2020	2	0
2021	8	0
2022	13	0
2023	7	1
2024	13	1
Total	60	2

No.	Date	Venue	Opponent	Score	Result	Competition
1	8 September 2023	St James' Park, Newcastle, England	Costa Rica	1–2	1–3	Friendly
2	16 January 2024	Khalifa International Stadium, Al Rayyan, Qatar	Oman	2–1	2–1	2023 AFC Asian Cup

== Honours ==
Al Hilal

- Saudi Pro League: 2017–18, 2019–20, 2020–21, 2021–22, 2023–24
- Kings Cup: 2019–20, 2022–23, 2023–24
- Saudi Super Cup: 2018, 2021, 2023, 2024
- AFC Champions League: 2019, 2021

Individual

- AFC Asian Cup Team of the Tournament: 2023
