= Renan Lodi =

Brazilian footballer (born 1998)

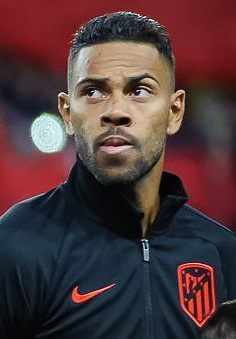
- Lodi with Atlético Madrid in 2019

Personal information
- Full name: Renan Augusto Lodi dos Santos
- Date of birth: 8 April 1998 (age 28)
- Place of birth: Serrana, Brazil
- Height: 1.73 m (5 ft 8 in)
- Position: Left-back

Team information
- Current team: Atlético Mineiro
- Number: 6

Youth career
- 2012–2017: Athletico Paranaense

Senior career*
Years	Team	Apps	(Gls)
2016–2019	Athletico Paranaense	48	(1)
2019–2023	Atlético Madrid	84	(4)
2022–2023	→ Nottingham Forest (loan)	28	(1)
2023–2024	Marseille	14	(0)
2024–2025	Al Hilal	35	(3)
2025–	Atlético Mineiro	26	(2)

International career^{‡}
2019–	Brazil	19	(0)
Medal record
Representing Brazil
Copa América
Runner-up	2021 Brazil
- * Club domestic league appearances and goals as of 21 July 2026 ‡ National team caps and goals as of 16 November 2023

Renan Augusto Lodi dos Santos (born 8 April 1998), known as Renan Lodi, is a Brazilian professional footballer who plays as a left-back for Campeonato Brasileiro Série A club Atlético Mineiro.

Lodi is an international player with the Brazil national team, having participated in the runners-up campaign of the 2021 Copa América.

== Club career ==
=== Athletico Paranaense ===
Born in Serrana, São Paulo, Lodi joined Athletico Paranaense's youth setup in 2012. He made his first team – and Série A – debut on 14 October 2016, starting in a 1–0 away loss against Grêmio.

Lodi subsequently represented the under-23 in the Campeonato Paranaense, and scored his first senior goal on 25 March 2018, netting the opener in a 5–0 home routing of Maringá. Three days later, he extended his contract until March 2021.

Lodi became a regular starter under new manager Tiago Nunes, and renewed his contract until 2022 on 10 August 2018.

=== Atlético Madrid ===
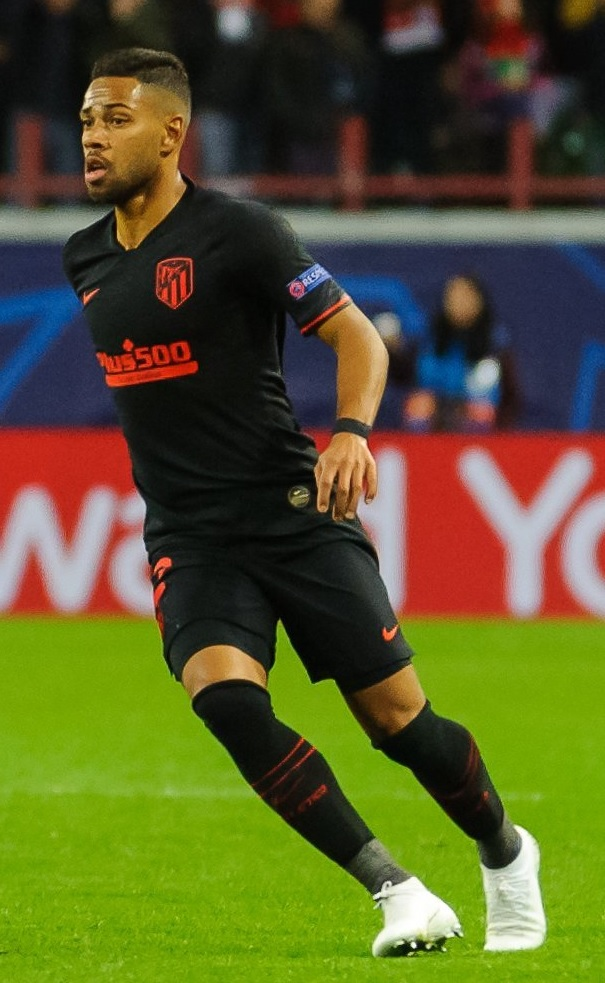
Lodi with Atlético Madrid in 2019

On 28 June 2019, La Liga side Atlético Madrid reached an agreement in principle with Athletico Paranaense for the transfer of Lodi. The deal was completed on 7 July 2019 and Lodi signed a six-year contract with the club. On 24 November 2019, Lodi scored his first goal for Atlético in a 1–1 draw with Granada. On 16 May 2021, Lodi came on as a substitute and scored a late equalizing goal in the eventual 2–1 home win over Osasuna that would keep the club in the title race against Real Madrid. The following week, as Atlético won the last game in the competition, Lodi became a 2020–21 La Liga champion as part of the team.

On 15 March 2022, Lodi scored his first Champions League goal to help Atlético Madrid beat Manchester United 1–0 at Old Trafford and qualify for the quarter-finals, securing a 2–1 aggregate win.

==== Nottingham Forest (loan) ====
On 29 August 2022, Lodi signed for Premier League club Nottingham Forest on a season-long loan deal. He scored his first goal for Nottingham Forest on 9 November 2022 against Tottenham Hotspur in the EFL Cup.

=== Marseille ===
On 14 July 2023, Olympique de Marseille confirmed that they had reached an agreement to acquire Renan Lodi from Atlético Madrid, having already agreed personal terms with him, for a transfer fee of €13 million with a 20% sell-on clause.

=== Al-Hilal ===
On 17 January 2024, Lodi signed a three-and-a-half-year contract with Saudi Pro League club Al Hilal for a reported fee of €23 million. In September 2025, he unilaterally ended his contract with the club upon his return to his homeland. The decision came after being left out of the 2025–26 Saudi Pro League squad due to the foreign player limit.

=== Atlético Mineiro ===
On 24 December 2025, Campeonato Brasileiro Série A club Atlético Mineiro announced an agreement in principle to sign Lodi on a free transfer and a five-year contract. On 27 December, the deal was made official.

== International career ==
Lodi made his debut for the Brazil national team on 10 October 2019, replacing Alex Sandro in a 1–1 draw with Senegal.

== Career statistics ==
=== Club ===
As of match played 21 July 2026

Appearances and goals by club, season and competition
Club	Season	League			State league (Note: Includes Campeonato Paranaense, Campeonato Mineiro)		National cup (Note: Includes Copa do Brasil, Copa del Rey, Coupe de France, King's Cup)		League cup (Note: Includes EFL Cup)		Continental		Other		Total	
Club	Season	Division	Apps	Goals	Apps	Goals	Apps	Goals	Apps	Goals	Apps	Goals	Apps	Goals	Apps	Goals
Athletico Paranaense	2016	Série A	3	0	0	0	0	0	—		0	0	—		3	0
Athletico Paranaense	2017	Série A	0	0	7	0	0	0	—		0	0	—		7	0
Athletico Paranaense	2018	Série A	24	0	11	1	1	0	—		12 (Note: Appearances in Copa Sudamericana)	2	—		48	3
Athletico Paranaense	2019	Série A	3	0	0	0	1	0	—		6 (Note: Appearances in Copa Libertadores)	2	2 (Note: Appearances in Recopa Sudamericana)	0	12	2
Athletico Paranaense	Total		30	0	18	1	2	0	—		18	4	2	0	74	5
Atlético Madrid	2019–20	La Liga	32	1	—		0	0	—		9 (Note: Appearances in UEFA Champions League)	0	2 (Note: Appearance(s) in Supercopa de España)	0	43	1
Atlético Madrid	2020–21	La Liga	23	1	—		2	0	—		8	0	—		33	1
Atlético Madrid	2021–22	La Liga	29	2	—		2	1	—		10	1	1	0	42	4
Atlético Madrid	Total		84	4	—		4	1	—		27	1	3	0	118	6
Nottingham Forest (loan)	2022–23	Premier League	28	0	—		0	0	4	1	—		—		32	1
Marseille	2023–24	Ligue 1	14	0	—		1	0	—		8 (Note: Two appearances in UEFA Champions League, six appearances in UEFA Europa League)	0	—		23	0
Al Hilal	2023–24	Saudi Pro League	11	0	—		1	0	—		0	0	2 (Note: Appearances in Saudi Super Cup)	0	14	0
Al Hilal	2024–25	Saudi Pro League	24	3	—		2	0	—		9 (Note: Appearances in AFC Champions League Elite)	1	7 (Note: Two appearances in Saudi Super Cup, five appearances in FIFA Club World Cup)	0	42	4
Al Hilal	Total		35	3	—		3	0	—		9	1	9	0	56	4
Atlético Mineiro	2026	Série A	18	0	8	2	2	1	—		4	1	—		32	4
Career total			209	7	26	3	12	2	4	1	66	7	14	0	331	20

=== International ===
As of match played 16 November 2023

Appearances and goals by national team and year
National team	Year	Apps	Goals
Brazil	2019	4	0
Brazil	2020	4	0
Brazil	2021	7	0
Brazil	2022	1	0
Brazil	2023	3	0
Total		19	0

== Honours ==
Athletico Paranaense

- Copa Sudamericana: 2018
- Campeonato Paranaense: 2018
- Recopa Sudamericana runner-up: 2019

Atlético Madrid

- La Liga: 2020–21

Al Hilal

- Saudi Pro League: 2023–24
- King Cup: 2023–24
- Saudi Super Cup: 2023, 2024

Brazil

- Copa América runner-up: 2021
