= Hamad Al-Yami =

Saudi Arabian footballer (born 1999)

Personal information
- Full name: Hamad Turki Al Tuhayfan Al-Yami
- Date of birth: 17 May 1999 (age 27)
- Place of birth: Khobar, Saudi Arabia
- Height: 1.73 m (5 ft 8 in)
- Position: Right-back

Team information
- Current team: Al-Hilal
- Number: 88

Youth career
- 2014-2018: Al-Qadsiah

Senior career*
Years	Team	Apps	(Gls)
2018–2021	Al-Qadsiah	67	(6)
2021–	Al-Hilal	65	(1)
2023–2024	→ Al-Shabab (loan)	24	(0)

International career
2017–2019	Saudi Arabia U20		
2020–2022	Saudi Arabia U23		
- * Club domestic league appearances and goals as of 24 February 2026

Hamad Al-Yami (Arabic: حمد اليامي; born 17 May 1999), is a Saudi Arabian professional footballer who plays as a right-back for Saudi Pro League side Al-Hilal.

== Career ==
Al-Yami began his career at the youth teams of his hometown club Al-Qadsiah. On 27 May 2018, Al-Yami signed his first professional contract with the club. On 12 April 2019, Al-Yami made his first-team debut in a 2–0 defeat to Al-Taawoun. During the 2019–20 season, Al-Yami made 37 appearances and scored four times helping Al-Qadsiah to a second-place finish and earn promotion to the Pro League.

On 11 December 2020, Al-Yami signed a pre-contract agreement with Al-Hilal. He officially joined the club following the conclusion of the 2020–21 season. He made his debut on 18 September 2021 in the 3–2 win against Al-Ettifaq. On 6 September 2023, Al-Yami joined Al-Shabab on a one-year loan.

== Career statistics ==
=== Club ===
As of 4 July 2025.

Club	Season	League			King's Cup		Continental		Other		Total	
Club	Season	Division	Apps	Goals	Apps	Goals	Apps	Goals	Apps	Goals	Apps	Goals
Al-Qadsiah	2018–19	Saudi Pro League	1	0	0	0	–		–		1	0
Al-Qadsiah	2019–20	Saudi Pro League	37	4	0	0	–		–		37	4
Al-Qadsiah	2020–21	Saudi Pro League	29	2	2	0	–		–		31	2
Al-Qadsiah	Total		67	6	2	0	0	0	0	0	69	6
Al-Hilal	2021–22	Saudi Pro League	13	0	1	0	3 (Note: Appearances in AFC Champions League)	0	1 (Note: Appearance(s) in Saudi Super Cup)	0	18	0
Al-Hilal	2022–23	Saudi Pro League	9	1	2	0	5	0	0	0	16	1
Al-Hilal	2024–25	Saudi Pro League	21	0	3	0	3 (Note: Appearances in AFC Champions League Elite)	1	6 (Note: One appearance in Saudi Super Cup, five appearances in FIFA Club World Cup)	0	33	1
Al-Hilal	Total		43	1	6	0	11	1	7	0	67	2
Al-Shabab (loan)	2023–24	Saudi Pro League	24	0	2	0	–		–		26	0
Career total			134	7	10	0	11	1	7	0	162	8

== Honours ==
Al-Hilal

- Saudi Pro League: 2021–22
- King Cup: 2022–23
- Saudi Super Cup: 2021, 2024
- AFC Champions League: 2021

Saudi Arabia U23

- AFC U-23 Asian Cup: 2022
