= Michael Rechner =

German footballer (born 1980)

Personal information
- Date of birth: 27 May 1980 (age 46)
- Place of birth: Mosbach, West Germany
- Height: 1.85 m (6 ft 1 in)
- Position: Goalkeeper

Team information
- Current team: Bayern Munich (goalkeeping coach)

Youth career
- SV Schefflenz
- Waldhof Mannheim

Senior career*
Years	Team	Apps	(Gls)
1999–2001	Hamburger SV II	43	(0)
2001–2002	VfR Mannheim	34	(0)
2002–2003	Waldhof Mannheim	7	(0)
2002–2003	Waldhof Mannheim II	18	(0)
2003–2004	FC Sachsen Leipzig	25	(0)
2004–2005	FC Schweinfurt	0	(0)
2005–2006	Waldhof Mannheim	20	(0)
2006–2008	TSG Weinheim	0	(0)
2008–2009	FC Zuzenhausen	0	(0)

International career
1998–1999	Germany U18	3	

Managerial career
- 2008–2013: TSG 1899 Hoffenheim youth (goalkeeper coach)
- 2013–2014: TSG 1899 Hoffenheim II (goalkeeping coach)
- 2015–2023: TSG 1899 Hoffenheim (goalkeeping coach)
- 2021–2023: Turkey (goalkeeping coach)
- 2023–: Bayern Munich (goalkeeping coach)
- * Club domestic league appearances and goals

Michael Rechner (born 27 May 1980) is a German former professional footballer who works as the goalkeeping coach for Bundesliga club Bayern Munich.

== Playing career ==
Rechner was born in Mosbach, West Germany. He started playing the youth of SV Schefflenz, subsequently he transferred to the youth academy of the well-known SV Waldhof Mannheim. During that time he also made three appearances for the Germany U18 national team. His debut was in 1998 in the international match against Northern Ireland (0–0). In 1999 Rechner signed a contract with Hamburger SV, where he trained with the pro-team (e.g. with goalkeeper Hans-Jörg Butt) and played for the U-23 team in the Regionalliga North. In 2001, Rechner transferred to the third-tiered team of VfR Mannheim, which played in the Regionalliga Süd.

After 34 games with the VfR Rechner returned to Waldhof Mannheim in 2002, where he appeared in seven games in the 2. Bundesliga and twice in the DFB-Pokal. However the team with the coaches Andy Egli, Walter Pradtand and Stefan Kuntz relegated to the third division after this season.

Rechner affiliated to the ambitioned Regionalliga team of FC Sachsen Leipzig. He played 25 times.

== Post-playing career ==
In 2004, Rechner decided to end his professional career. He started studying sport science at the Ruprecht-Karls-Universität Heidelberg. At the same time he played semi-professional for 1.FC Schweinfurt 05, SV Waldhof Mannheim and at his last for FC Zuzenhausen. He finished his studies with his master thesis “The requirement profile and the modern training methodology of a goalkeeper”.

In 2008, he started to work as the Coordinator of Goalkeeping for TSG 1899 Hoffenheim, where he is still responsible for the goalkeeping department. His responsibilities are the conception, the training and such as scouting of the goalkeepers. He trained the goalkeepers of the U23 and U19 by himself until 2014. Since January 2015 Rechner is the main responsible of the professionals and directs the goalkeeper practice of the Bundesliga team. Moreover he owns the UEFA Coach-A-License. In 2016–17 he participated in the DFB pilot project “UEFA A-Goalkeeping A-License”.

Since Rechner has been responsible for the first team, Oliver Baumann has played continuously and undisputedly as the No. 1 for the Bundesliga team. In 2020, Baumann was invited to join the German senior national team for the first time. Additionally, 1899 Hoffenheim generated million profits with selling goalkeepers like Koen Casteels (to VFL Wolfsburg), Marvin Schwäbe (to Bröndby Kopenhagen) and Gregor Kobel (to VfB Stuttgart). The goalkeeper coaches Steffen Krebs (VfB Stuttgart), Marjan Petkovic (SV Wehen), Fabian Otte (Borussia Mönchengladbach) and Dennis Neudahm (1.FC Nürnberg) found their ways to the professional sector through 1899 Hoffenheim.

From 2009 to 2018, Rechner was instructor for goalkeeper training at Badischer Fußballverband and since 2010 speaker for Deutscher Fußball-Bund. In the meantime, he gave lectures on goalkeeping worldwide.

In 2011, Rechner started his project “Goalkeeping Development” with developing a goalkeeper-specific software. Since it has been launched to the market in 2015, numerous national and international professional teams such as a lot of amateur and youth goalkeeper coaches are using it. In 2017, Rechner found the Goalkeeping Development GmbH, with many further offers concerning the goalkeeper game.

In October 2021, Rechner became the goalkeeping coach of Turkey national team on an interim basis under head coach Stefan Kuntz. On 8 February 2023, he rejoined Julian Nagelsmann's coaching staff at Bayern Munich.
