= 2018–19 Al-Qadsiah FC season =

Al-Qadsiah
2018–19 season
- President: Musaad Al-Zamil
- Manager: Aleksandar Stanojević (until 4 November); Ivaylo Petev (from 11 November until 10 March); Bandar Basraih (from 10 March until 22 April); Nacif Beyaoui (from 22 April)
- Stadium: Prince Saud bin Jalawi Stadium
- Pro League: 14th (relegated)
- King Cup: Round of 64 (knocked out by Al-Bukayriyah)
- Top goalscorer: League: Bismark (10); All: Bismark (10)
- Highest home attendance: 10,420 vs Al-Hilal (2 November 2018)
- Lowest home attendance: 420 vs Ohod (5 April 2019)
- Average home league attendance: 2,883
Home colours	Away colours
- All statistics correct as of 16 May 2019.

The 2018–19 season was Al-Qadsiah's fourth consecutive season in the Pro League and 52nd year in their existence. Along with competing in the Pro League, the club also participated in the King Cup.

The season covers the period from 1 July 2018 to 30 June 2019.

== Players ==
=== Squad information ===
As of 1 February 2019

Note: Flags indicate national team as defined under FIFA eligibility rules; some limited exceptions apply. Players may hold more than one non-FIFA nationality.

No.	Pos.	Nation	Player
1	GK	AUS	Jack Duncan
3	MF	GHA	Mohammed Fatau
4	DF	KSA	Abdulmohsen Fallatah
5	DF	KSA	Mohammed Al-Khabrani
6	DF	AUS	Rhys Williams
7	MF	KSA	Hassan Al-Amri
9	FW	KSA	Haroune Camara
10	MF	BRA	Bismark
14	MF	KSA	Mansour Al-Najjar
15	DF	KSA	Fawaz Fallatah
16	MF	KSA	Nawaf Al-Azizi
17	DF	KSA	Abdullah Al-Bishi
18	MF	KSA	Naif Hazazi (captain)
19	DF	KSA	Adnan Fallatah
20	MF	KSA	Khalid Al-Ghannam
22	MF	KSA	Sami Al-Najei (on loan from Al-Nassr)

No.	Pos.	Nation	Player
23	DF	KSA	Ibrahim Al-Shoeil
25	DF	KSA	Khalifah Al-Dawsari
26	MF	KSA	Shaye Sharahili
30	MF	SYR	Youssef Kalfa
31	DF	ALG	Mokhtar Belkhiter (on loan from Club Africain)
32	DF	KSA	Muhannad Al-Malki
37	GK	KSA	Abdulaziz Al-Shehri
44	DF	KSA	Hatim Belal (on loan from Al-Fayha)
45	FW	KSA	Mukhtar Fallatah
47	MF	KSA	Abdulmohsen Al-Qahtani
49	MF	KSA	Ahmed Al-Zain (on loan from Al-Ahli)
55	GK	KSA	Faisel Masrahi
77	MF	BRA	Elton
88	MF	KSA	Hamad Al-Yami
97	GK	KSA	Emad Fida
99	FW	BRA	Jorge

=== Out on loan ===
Note: Flags indicate national team as defined under FIFA eligibility rules; some limited exceptions apply. Players may hold more than one non-FIFA nationality.

No.	Pos.	Nation	Player
2	DF	KSA	Yassin Barnawi (at Al-Ittihad until 30 June 2019)
24	MF	KSA	Hassan Abo Shararah (at Al-Kawkab until 30 June 2019)
27	DF	KSA	Nasser Al-Khalifah (at Al-Nahda until 30 June 2019)
40	GK	KSA	Ahmed Al-Fahmi (at Al-Washm until 30 June 2019)

No.	Pos.	Nation	Player
—	MF	KSA	Wesam Wahib (at Al-Kawkab until 30 June 2019)
—	FW	NGA	Stanley Ohawuchi (at Ajman until 30 June 2019)
—	FW	KSA	Waleed Al-Shanqeeti (at Al-Washm until 30 June 2019)
—	FW	KSA	Fahad Al-Johani (at Al-Batin until 30 June 2019)

== Transfers ==
=== In ===
Date	Pos.	Name	Previous club	Fee	Source
30 May 2018	DF	(Saudi Arabia) Abdullah Al-Bishi	(Saudi Arabia) Al-Qaisumah	End of loan	
30 May 2018	DF	(Saudi Arabia) Nasser Al-Khalifa	(Saudi Arabia) Al-Khaleej	End of loan	
30 May 2018	MF	(Saudi Arabia) Hamad Al-Shehri	(Saudi Arabia) Al-Qaisumah	End of loan	
30 May 2018	MF	(Saudi Arabia) Yahya Awaji	(Saudi Arabia) Al-Nahda	End of loan	
30 May 2018	FW	(Saudi Arabia) Fahad Al-Johani	(Saudi Arabia) Al-Fayha	End of loan	
22 July 2018	DF	(Saudi Arabia) Adnan Fallatah	(Saudi Arabia) Al-Ittihad	Free	
11 July 2018	DF	(Australia) Rhys Williams	(Australia) Melbourne Victory	Free	
31 July 2018	GK	(Australia) Jack Duncan	(Australia) Newcastle Jets	Undisclosed	
9 August 2018	FW	(Cameroon) Aboubakar Oumarou	(China) Shenzhen	Free	
1 January 2019	FW	(Brazil) Jorge	(Malaysia) Johor Darul Ta'zim	Free	
19 January 2019	FW	(Saudi Arabia) Mukhtar Fallatah	(Saudi Arabia) Al-Hilal	Free	
4 February 2019	MF	(Syria) Youssef Kalfa	(Saudi Arabia) Al-Hazem	Undisclosed	

=== Loans in ===
Date	Pos.	Name	Parent club	End date	Source
2 July 2018	MF	(Brazil) Yago	(Brazil) Atlético Mineiro	31 January 2019	
22 July 2018	MF	(Saudi Arabia) Ahmed Al-Zain	(Saudi Arabia) Al-Ahli	End of season	
19 January 2019	DF	(Algeria) Mokhtar Belkhiter	(Tunisia) Club Africain	End of season	
3 February 2019	MF	(Saudi Arabia) Sami Al-Najei	(Saudi Arabia) Al-Nassr	End of season	

=== Out ===
Date	Pos.	Name	New club	Fee	Source
30 May 2018	DF	(Saudi Arabia) Hatim Belal	(Saudi Arabia) Al-Fayha	End of loan	
30 May 2018	MF	(Saudi Arabia) Abdullaziz Al-Dawsari	(Saudi Arabia) Al-Hilal	End of loan	
25 June 2018	FW	(Saudi Arabia) Mazen Abu Shararah	(Saudi Arabia) Al-Raed	Free	
1 July 2018	FW	(Brazil) Paulo Sérgio	Released		
4 July 2018	DF	(Saudi Arabia) Hamad Al-Jizani	(Saudi Arabia) Hajer	Free	
19 July 2018	MF	(Saudi Arabia) Ahmed Karenshi	(Saudi Arabia) Jeddah	Free	
28 July 2018	MF	(Saudi Arabia) Abdulrahman Al-Qarni	(Saudi Arabia) Al-Adalah	Free	
23 August 2018	DF	(Saudi Arabia) Mazen Othman	(Saudi Arabia) Damac	Free	
1 October 2018	MF	(Saudi Arabia) Saud Al-Selouli	(Saudi Arabia) Al-Jubail	Free	
1 October 2018	MF	(Saudi Arabia) Hamad Al-Shehri	(Saudi Arabia) Al-Thoqbah	Free	
1 October 2018	MF	(Saudi Arabia) Yahya Awaji	(Saudi Arabia) Al-Thoqbah	Free	
1 January 2019	MF	(Brazil) Jorginho	(Brazil) Atlético Goianiense	End of loan	
20 January 2019	FW	(Cameroon) Aboubakar Oumarou	Released		
11 February 2019	GK	(Saudi Arabia) Mohammed Assiri	(Saudi Arabia) Al-Batin	Free	
19 March 2019	MF	(Brazil) Yago	(Brazil) Atlético Mineiro	End of loan	

=== Loans out ===
Date	Pos.	Name	Subsequent club	End date	Source
1 June 2018	MF	(Ghana) Mohammed Fatau	Al-Kuwait	1 January 2019	
7 July 2018	FW	(Nigeria) Stanley Ohawuchi	(United Arab Emirates) Ajman	End of season	
12 July 2018	FW	(Saudi Arabia) Waleed Al-Shangeati	(Saudi Arabia) Al-Washm	End of season	
13 July 2018	GK	(Saudi Arabia) Ahmed Al-Fahmi	(Saudi Arabia) Al-Washm	End of season	
16 July 2018	FW	(Saudi Arabia) Fahad Al-Johani	(Saudi Arabia) Al-Batin	End of season	
25 July 2018	MF	(Saudi Arabia) Wesam Wahib	(Saudi Arabia) Al-Kawkab	End of season	
22 January 2019	DF	(Saudi Arabia) Yassin Barnawi	(Saudi Arabia) Al-Ittihad	End of season	
4 February 2019	MF	(Saudi Arabia) Hassan Abu Sharara	(Saudi Arabia) Al-Kawkab	End of season	
8 February 2019	DF	(Saudi Arabia) Nasser Al-Khalifa	(Saudi Arabia) Al-Nahda	End of season	

== Competitions ==
=== Overall ===
Competition	Started round	Current position / round	Final position / round	First match	Last match
Saudi Pro League	—	—	14th	31 August 2018	16 May 2019
King Cup	Round of 64	—	Round of 64	1 January 2019	

Last Updated: 16 May 2019

=== Saudi Pro League ===
==== League table ====
Pos	Team	Pld	W	D	L	GF	GA	GD	Pts	Qualification or relegation
12	Al-Fayha	30	9	5	16	36	52	−16	32	
13	Al-Hazem (O)	30	7	10	13	33	50	−17	31	Qualification for Relegation play-offs
14	Al-Qadsiah (R)	30	8	4	18	34	51	−17	28	Relegation to Prince Mohammad bin Salman League
15	Al-Batin (R)	30	7	4	19	29	53	−24	25	Relegation to Prince Mohammad bin Salman League
16	Ohod (R)	30	5	6	19	25	62	−37	21	Relegation to Prince Mohammad bin Salman League

Source: spl.com
Rules for classification: 1) Points; 2) Head-to-head points; 3) Head-to-head goal difference; 4) Total goal difference; 5) Total goals scored; 6) Play-off (only for deciding champion, relegation and AFC competitions participation).
(O) Play-off winners; (R) Relegated

==== Results summary ====
Overall								Home						Away					
Pld	W	D	L	GF	GA	GD	Pts	W	D	L	GF	GA	GD	W	D	L	GF	GA	GD
30	8	4	18	34	51	−17	28	5	3	7	18	19	−1	3	1	11	16	32	−16

Last updated: 16 May 2019.
Source: Competitive matches

==== Results by round ====
Round	1	2	3	4	5	6	7	8	9	10	11	12	13	14	15	16	17	18	19	20	21	22	23	24	25	26	27	28	29	30
Ground	H	A	H	A	H	A	A	H	A	H	H	H	A	H	A	H	A	H	A	A	H	A	H	A	A	H	A	H	A	H
Result	D	W	L	L	L	L	L	L	W	W	D	W	W	W	L	L	L	W	L	L	L	D	L	L	L	W	L	L	L	D
Position	11	4	9	10	12	11	12	15	14	11	11	10	10	8	10	10	11	9	10	11	11	11	11	11	12	11	14	14	14	14

Updated to match(es) played on 16 May 2019. Source: Competitive matches
A = Away; H = Home; W = Win; D = Draw; L = Loss

==== Matches ====
All times are local, AST (UTC+3).

Win Draw Loss Postponed

31 August 2018 1	Al-Qadsiah	0–0	Al-Fateh	Khobar
18:40		Report		Stadium: Prince Saud bin Jalawi Stadium; Attendance: 1,637; Referee: Mark Clattenburg (England)

15 September 2018 2	Al-Ittihad	0–3	Al-Qadsiah	Jeddah
20:45	Romarinho (yellow card) 24'; Al-Daheem (yellow card) 52'	Report	Élton 4'; Al-Amri (yellow card) 13'; Barnawi (yellow card) 51'; Jorginho (yellow card) 53', (goal) 64'; Guy (yellow card) 55'; Bismark 81'	Stadium: King Abdullah Sports City; Attendance: 23,916; Referee: Milorad Mažić (Serbia)

19 September 2018 3	Al-Qadsiah	0–3	Al-Nassr	Khobar
20:20	Adnan F. (yellow card) 11' (yellow-red card) 48'	Report	Musa 21', 40', 66'	Stadium: Prince Saud bin Jalawi Stadium; Attendance: 9,145; Referee: Artur Soares Dias (Portugal)

28 September 2018 4	Al-Fayha	4–2	Al-Qadsiah	Al-Majma'ah
18:30	Fernández 10'; Al Salem 52', 58'; Bamsaud (yellow card) 59'; Asprilla 90+1'	Report	Al-Amri 19', (yellow card) 72'; Yago (yellow card) 23'; Élton 46'	Stadium: King Salman Sport City Stadium; Attendance: 3,020; Referee: Szymon Marciniak (Poland)

6 October 2018 5	Al-Qadsiah	0–1	Al-Wehda	Khobar
18:00	Oumarou (yellow card) 14'	Report	Al-Malki (yellow card) 33'; Abdu Jaber 87'	Stadium: Prince Saud bin Jalawi Stadium; Attendance: 1,700; Referee: Pavel Královec (Czech Republic)

18 October 2018 6	Al-Hazem	2–1	Al-Qadsiah	Buraidah
18:15	Al-Saiari 7', 47'; Muralha (yellow card) 51'	Report	Williams (yellow card) 27'; Bismark 52'; Sharahili (yellow card) 79'	Stadium: King Abdullah Sport City Stadium; Attendance: 1,350; Referee: Artur Soares Dias (Portugal)

26 October 2018 7	Al-Shabab	2–1	Al-Qadsiah	Riyadh
18:05	Ghazi (yellow card) 16'; Luiz Antônio 40'; Kaabi (yellow card) 90+5', (goal) 90+6'	Report	F. Fallatah (yellow card) 14'; Élton 36'; Al-Shoeil (yellow card) 45'; Jorginho (red card) 45+4'; Williams (yellow card) 90+5'	Stadium: Prince Faisal bin Fahd Stadium; Attendance: 1,235; Referee: Simon Lee Evans (Wales)

2 November 2018 8	Al-Qadsiah	0–2	Al-Hilal	Khobar
17:35	F. Fallatah (yellow card) 44'	Report	Al-Dawsari 44' (pen.); Kanno 66'; Al-Shahrani (yellow card) 86'	Stadium: Prince Saud bin Jalawi Stadium; Attendance: 10,420; Referee: Bartosz Frankowski (Poland)

9 November 2018 9	Al-Ahli	0–2	Al-Qadsiah	Jeddah
18:20	Al-Owais (yellow card) 79'	Report	Camara 69', 78'	Stadium: King Abdullah Sports City; Attendance: 21,499; Referee: Damir Skomina (Slovenia)

23 November 2018 10	Al-Qadsiah	3–1	Al-Raed	Khobar
17:30	Barnawi (yellow card) 11'; Bismark 45'; Al-Zain 58'; Masrahi (yellow card) 77'; Camara 90+4'	Report	Al-Farhan (yellow card) 61'; Hamoudan 71'	Stadium: Prince Saud bin Jalawi Stadium; Attendance: 902; Referee: Artur Soares Dias (Portugal)

30 November 2018 11	Al-Qadsiah	1–1	Al-Faisaly	Khobar
17:25	Al-Zain (yellow card) 25'; Williams (yellow card) 34'; Élton 46'; Barnawi (yellow card) 60'; Camara (yellow card) 77'; Bismark (yellow card) 90+4'	Report	Balghaith (yellow card) 8'; Luisinho 61' (pen.); Akpala (yellow card) 90+6'	Stadium: Prince Saud bin Jalawi Stadium; Attendance: 1,178; Referee: Anastasios Sidiropoulos (Greece)

6 December 2018 12	Al-Qadsiah	2–0	Al-Ettifaq	Khobar
17:25	Al-Zain 29'; Camara (yellow card) 83'; Duncan (yellow card) 90+4'; Élton 90+5'	Report	Al-Khairi (yellow card) 32'; Arias (yellow card) 77'; M'Bolhi (yellow card) 86'	Stadium: Prince Saud bin Jalawi Stadium; Attendance: 3,094; Referee: Viktor Kassai (Hungary)

17 December 2018 13	Ohod	1–3	Al-Qadsiah	Medina
18:20	Teikeu 80'	Report	Oumarou 22'; Al-Zain 32'; Belal (yellow card) 72'; Adnan F. (yellow card) 76'; Camara 78'	Stadium: Prince Mohammed bin Abdul Aziz Stadium; Attendance: 7,110; Referee: Mark Clattenburg (England)

21 December 2018 14	Al-Qadsiah	3–1	Al-Taawoun	Khobar
17:30	Al-Bishi (yellow card) 45'; Al-Khabrani (yellow card) 50'; Al-Zain 54'; Adnan F. (yellow card) 56'; Camara 59', (yellow card) 75'; Bismark 78'	Report	Manoel (yellow card) 34'; Al-Zubaidi (yellow card) 41'; Adam 90+5'	Stadium: Prince Saud bin Jalawi Stadium; Attendance: 1,415; Referee: Anastasios Sidiropoulos (Greece)

27 December 2018 15	Al-Batin	2–0	Al-Qadsiah	Hafar al-Batin
17:45	Waqes (yellow card) 11'; Nasser (yellow card) 43'; Crysan 65', 90+3' (pen.)	Report	Al-Zain (yellow card) 53'; Williams (yellow card) 71'; Sharahili (yellow card) 73'	Stadium: Al-Batin Club Stadium; Attendance: 2,124; Referee: Viktor Kassai (Hungary)

10 January 2019 16	Al-Qadsiah	0–1	Al-Ittihad	Khobar
19:50	Fatau (yellow card) 42'; Sharahili (yellow card) 70'; Jorge Silva (yellow card) 78'	Report	Romarinho 56'; Jonas (yellow card) 90+3'	Stadium: Prince Saud bin Jalawi Stadium; Attendance: 6,856; Referee: Mark Clattenburg (England)

27 January 2019 17	Al-Fateh	2–0	Al-Qadsiah	Al-Hasa
15:20	Pedro 19' (pen.), (yellow card) 89'; Al-Khabrani 90+3' (o.g.)	Report	Al-Zain (red card) 43'; Al-Khabrani (yellow card) 66'	Stadium: Prince Abdullah bin Jalawi Stadium; Attendance: 929; Referee: Mohammed Al-Hoaish

2 February 2019 18	Al-Qadsiah	2–0	Al-Fayha	Khobar
15:20	Camara 67'; Élton 70'	Report	Asprilla (yellow card) 59'; Al-Muziel (yellow card) 60' (yellow-red card) 64'	Stadium: Prince Saud bin Jalawi Stadium; Attendance: 898; Referee: Pawel Raczkowski (Poland)

6 February 2019 19	Al-Nassr	3–1	Al-Qadsiah	Riyadh
20:15	Hamdallah 10'; Williams 81' (o.g.); Al-Ghanam 90'; Jones (yellow card) 90+4'	Report	Williams 71'; Fatau (yellow card) 90+3'	Stadium: Prince Faisal bin Fahd Stadium; Attendance: 4,321; Referee: Pavel Královec (Czech Republic)

12 February 2019 20	Al-Hilal	4–1	Al-Qadsiah	Riyadh
18:30	Al Abed 34'; Gomis 46'; Al-Dawsari (yellow card) 60' (yellow-red card) 90+2'; Giovinco 80'; Al Bulaihi 88'	Report	Belkhiter (yellow card) 65'; Bismark 67'	Stadium: King Saud University Stadium; Attendance: 20,758; Referee: Tomasz Musiał (Poland)

22 February 2019 21	Al-Qadsiah	0–1	Al-Shabab	Khobar
18:15	F. Fallatah (yellow card) 11'; Camara (yellow card) 16'; Al-Khabrani (yellow card) 56'; Belkhiter (yellow card) 82'	Report	Al-Hamdan (yellow card) 62'; Benlamri (yellow card) 81', (goal) 85'	Stadium: Prince Saud bin Jalawi Stadium; Attendance: 1,322; Referee: Matthew Conger (New Zealand)

1 March 2019 22	Al-Raed	0–0	Al-Qadsiah	Buraidah
16:00	Mboyo (yellow card) 51'; Kanu (yellow card) 54'; Al-Shuwaish (yellow card) 75'	Report	Sharahili (yellow card) 53'; Abdulmohsen. F (yellow card) 73'; M. Fallatah (yellow card) 82'; Élton (yellow card) 83'; Williams (yellow card) 90+2'	Stadium: King Abdullah Sport City Stadium; Attendance: 1,419; Referee: Kevin Blom (Netherlands)

8 March 2019 23	Al-Qadsiah	1–2	Al-Ahli	Khobar
15:40	Belal (yellow card) 27'; Bismark 31'; Belkhiter (yellow card) 76'	Report	Al-Moasher (yellow card) 21'; Santos 37'; Al Somah 90+4'	Stadium: Prince Saud bin Jalawi Stadium; Attendance: 3,022; Referee: Dennis Higler (Netherlands)

14 March 2019 24	Al-Faisaly	3–0	Al-Qadsiah	Al Majma'ah
18:45	Al Ansari (yellow card) 45+1'; Mendash 56'; Luisinho 82'; Denílson 86', (yellow card) 87'	Report		Stadium: King Salman Sport City Stadium; Attendance: 511; Referee: Damir Skomina (Slovenia)

28 March 2019 25	Al-Ettifaq	3–2	Al-Qadsiah	Dammam
20:30	El Sayed (yellow card) 13'; Al-Sonain (yellow card) 23'; Alemán 45+4'; Al-Hazaa 86'; Akaïchi 90', (yellow card) 90+1'; Al-Aboud (yellow card) 90+4'	Report	Bismark 24' (pen.); Jorge Silva (yellow card) 45'; Élton 83' (pen.), (yellow card) 90+3'	Stadium: Prince Mohamed bin Fahd Stadium; Attendance: 3,442; Referee: Damir Skomina (Slovenia)

5 April 2019 26	Al-Qadsiah	4–2	Ohod	Khobar
18:35	Bismark 28', 45+4'; Hazazi (yellow card) 32'; Élton (yellow card) 39'; Camara 48'; Williams 52'	Report	Maâzou 9'; Otaif 70'; Al-Dhaw (yellow card) 75'; Aashor (red card) 90+3'	Stadium: Prince Saud bin Jalawi Stadium; Attendance: 420; Referee: Artur Soares Dias (Portugal)

12 April 2019 27	Al-Taawoun	2–0	Al-Qadsiah	Buraidah
19:05	Petrolina 14'; Sufyani 52'; Adam (yellow card) 90'	Report	Al-Shoeil (yellow card) 28'; Jorginho (yellow card) 34'; Abdulmohsen. F (yellow card) 45'	Stadium: King Abdullah Sport City Stadium; Attendance: 2,022; Referee: Miroslav Zelinka (Czech Republic)

19 April 2019 28	Al-Qadsiah	0–2	Al-Batin	Khobar
18:45	Bismark (yellow card) 34'; Al-Shoeil (yellow card) 46'	Report	Ounalli (yellow card) 24'; Mohanna (yellow card) 41'; Crysan 51' (pen.); Solan (yellow card) 58'; Jhonnattann 86'; Al-Mozairib (yellow card) 89'	Stadium: Prince Saud bin Jalawi Stadium; Attendance: 728; Referee: Deniz Aytekin (Germany)

11 May 2019 29	Al-Wehda	4–0	Al-Qadsiah	Mecca
22:30	Al-Malki (yellow card) 34'; Marcos Guilherme 37'; Mebarakou 42'; Darwish (yellow card) 54'; Al-Amri (yellow card) 78'; Kasongo 84'; Al-Qarni 90+1'	Report	Hazazi (yellow card) 48'	Stadium: King Abdul Aziz Stadium; Attendance: 477; Referee: Shukri Al-Hanfoush

16 May 2019 30	Al-Qadsiah	2–2	Al-Hazem	Khobar
22:30	Adnan F. (yellow card) 5'; Hazazi (yellow card) 67'; Al-Najar (yellow card) 69' (yellow-red card) 90+6'; Williams (yellow card) 79'; Bismark 80'; Al-Amri (yellow card) 84' (yellow-red card) 90+7'; Jorge Silva 87'; Al-Khabrani (yellow card) 90+5'	Report	Salomão 41'; Rodolfo 44'; Asselah (yellow card) 49' (yellow-red card) 90+9'; Al-Barakah (yellow card) 58'; Bakheet (yellow card) 66'	Stadium: Prince Saud bin Jalawi Stadium; Attendance: 500; Referee: Antonio Mateu Lahoz (Spain)

=== King Cup ===
All times are local, AST (UTC+3).

1 January 2019 Round of 64	Al-Bukayriyah	1–0	Al-Qadsiah	Al Bukayriyah
15:25	Al-Ghamdi 82'; Al-Saudi (yellow card) 90+5'	Report	Yago (yellow card) 24'; Masrahi (yellow card) 90+2'	Stadium: Al-Bukayriyah Club Stadium; Referee: Mohamed Marie'e

== Statistics ==
=== Squad statistics ===
As of 16 May 2019.

No.	Pos	Nat	Player	Total		Pro League		King Cup	
No.	Pos	Nat	Player	Apps	Goals	Apps	Goals	Apps	Goals
Goalkeepers
1	GK	(Australia) AUS	Jack Duncan	29	0	29	0	0	0
37	GK	(Saudi Arabia) KSA	Abdulaziz Al-Shehri	0	0	0	0	0	0
55	GK	(Saudi Arabia) KSA	Faisel Masrahi	3	0	1+1	0	1	0
97	GK	(Saudi Arabia) KSA	Emad Fida	0	0	0	0	0	0
Defenders
4	DF	(Saudi Arabia) KSA	Abdulmohsen Fallatah	6	0	3+2	0	1	0
5	DF	(Saudi Arabia) KSA	Mohammed Al-Khabrani	26	0	23+3	0	0	0
6	DF	(Australia) AUS	Rhys Williams	28	2	28	2	0	0
15	DF	(Saudi Arabia) KSA	Fawaz Fallatah	11	0	8+2	0	1	0
17	DF	(Saudi Arabia) KSA	Abdullah Al-Bishi	2	0	1+1	0	0	0
19	DF	(Saudi Arabia) KSA	Adnan Fallatah	16	0	16	0	0	0
23	DF	(Saudi Arabia) KSA	Ibrahim Al-Shoeil	11	0	9+2	0	0	0
25	DF	(Saudi Arabia) KSA	Khalifah Al-Dawsari	0	0	0	0	0	0
31	DF	(Algeria) ALG	Mokhtar Belkhiter	13	0	13	0	0	0
32	DF	(Saudi Arabia) KSA	Muhannad Al-Malki	0	0	0	0	0	0
44	DF	(Saudi Arabia) KSA	Hatim Belal	13	0	9+4	0	0	0
Midfielders
3	MF	(Ghana) GHA	Mohammed Fatau	9	0	9	0	0	0
7	MF	(Saudi Arabia) KSA	Hassan Al-Amri	9	1	2+6	1	1	0
10	MF	(Brazil) BRA	Bismark	29	10	28+1	10	0	0
14	MF	(Saudi Arabia) KSA	Mansour Al-Najjar	9	0	7+1	0	1	0
16	MF	(Saudi Arabia) KSA	Nawaf Al-Azizi	0	0	0	0	0	0
18	MF	(Saudi Arabia) KSA	Naif Hazazi	21	0	14+6	0	1	0
20	MF	(Saudi Arabia) KSA	Khalid Al-Ghannam	1	0	0+1	0	0	0
22	MF	(Saudi Arabia) KSA	Sami Al-Najei	4	0	2+2	0	0	0
26	MF	(Saudi Arabia) KSA	Shaye Sharahili	16	0	12+4	0	0	0
30	MF	(Syria) SYR	Youssef Kalfa	9	0	6+3	0	0	0
47	MF	(Saudi Arabia) KSA	Abdulmohsen Al-Qahtani	6	0	0+6	0	0	0
49	MF	(Saudi Arabia) KSA	Ahmed Al-Zain	15	4	9+5	4	1	0
77	MF	(Brazil) BRA	Élton	30	7	29	7	1	0
88	MF	(Saudi Arabia) KSA	Hamad Al-Yami	1	0	0+1	0	0	0
Forwards
9	FW	(Saudi Arabia) KSA	Haroune Camara	30	7	20+9	7	1	0
45	FW	(Saudi Arabia) KSA	Mukhtar Fallatah	7	0	0+7	0	0	0
99	FW	(Brazil) BRA	Jorge	11	1	5+6	1	0	0
Players sent out on loan this season
2	DF	(Saudi Arabia) KSA	Yassin Barnawi	13	0	11+1	0	1	0
24	MF	(Saudi Arabia) KSA	Hassan Abu Sharara	1	0	0	0	0+1	0
27	DF	(Saudi Arabia) KSA	Nasser Al-Khalifa	2	0	0+1	0	0+1	0
Player who made an appearance this season but have left the club
8	MF	(Brazil) BRA	Yago	14	0	12+1	0	1	0
11	FW	(Cameroon) CMR	Aboubakar Oumarou	12	1	3+8	1	0+1	0
12	MF	(Brazil) BRA	Jorginho	11	1	9+2	1	0	0
71	MF	(Ivory Coast) CIV	Hervé Guy	12	0	12	0	0	0

=== Goalscorers ===
Rank	No.	Pos	Nat	Name	Pro League	King Cup	Total
1	10	MF	(Brazil)	Bismark	10	0	10
2	9	FW	(Saudi Arabia)	Haroune Camara	7	0	7
2	77	MF	(Brazil)	Élton	7	0	7
4	49	MF	(Saudi Arabia)	Ahmed Al-Zain	4	0	4
5	6	DF	(Australia)	Rhys Williams	2	0	2
6	7	MF	(Saudi Arabia)	Hassan Al-Amri	1	0	1
6	11	FW	(Cameroon)	Aboubakar Oumarou	1	0	1
6	12	MF	(Brazil)	Jorginho	1	0	1
6	99	FW	(Brazil)	Jorge	1	0	1
Own goal					0	0	0
Total					34	0	34

Last Updated: 16 May 2019

=== Assists ===
Rank	No.	Pos	Nat	Name	Pro League	King Cup	Total
1	10	MF	(Brazil)	Bismark	6	0	6
2	77	MF	(Brazil)	Élton	4	0	4
3	9	FW	(Saudi Arabia)	Haroune Camara	3	0	3
3	49	MF	(Saudi Arabia)	Ahmed Al-Zain	3	0	3
5	19	DF	(Saudi Arabia)	Adnan Fallatah	2	0	2
1	6	DF	(Australia)	Rhys Williams	1	0	1
1	8	MF	(Brazil)	Yago	1	0	1
1	12	MF	(Brazil)	Jorginho	1	0	1
1	18	MF	(Saudi Arabia)	Naif Hazazi	1	0	1
1	30	MF	(Syria)	Youssef Kalfa	1	0	1
1	45	FW	(Saudi Arabia)	Mukhtar Fallatah	1	0	1
Total					24	0	24

Last Updated: 16 May 2019

=== Clean sheets ===
Rank	No.	Pos	Nat	Name	Pro League	King Cup	Total
1	1	GK	(Australia)	Jack Duncan	6	0	6
Total					6	0	6

Last Updated: 1 March 2019
