= 2016–17 Ittihad FC season =

Al-Ittihad
2016–17 season
- President: Anmar abdalla Hailae (from 4 June 2017)
- Manager: José Luis Sierra
- Stadium: King Abdullah Sports City
- SPL: 1st
- Crown Prince Cup: Final
- King Cup: Round of 32
- AFC Champions League: 2017: Group stage
- Top goalscorer: League: Kahraba (5); All: Kahraba (5)
- Average home league attendance: 25,407
| Home colours | Away colours |
- All statistics correct as of 28 September 2016.

The 2016–17 season is the Al-Ittihad Club of Jeddah's 90th in existence and 41st consecutive season in the top flight of Saudi Arabian football. Along with Pro League, the club also competed in the AFC Champions League, Crown Prince Cup and the King Cup.

== Players ==
=== Squad information ===
As of 23 September 2016

Note: Flags indicate national team as defined under FIFA eligibility rules; some limited exceptions apply. Players may hold more than one non-FIFA nationality.

| No. | Pos. | Nation | Player |
|---|---|---|---|
| 1 | GK | KSA | Ali Al-Ameri |
| 12 | GK | KSA | Assaf Al-Qarni |
| 22 | GK | KSA | Fawaz Al-Qarni |
| 25 | GK | KSA | Hani Al-Nahedh |
| 2 | DF | KSA | Abdurahman Al-Rio |
| 3 | DF | KSA | Mansor Namazi |
| 4 | DF | KSA | Bader Al-Nakhli |
| 6 | DF | KSA | Basem Al-Montashari |
| 13 | DF | KSA | Ahmed Assiri (Vice-captain) |
| 16 | DF | KSA | Mohammed Qassem |
| 17 | DF | KSA | Turki Al Jalvan |
| 19 | DF | KSA | Adnan Fallatah (captain) |
| 24 | DF | KSA | Ammar Al-Daheem |
| 27 | DF | KSA | Awadh Khrees |
| 30 | DF | KSA | Ziyad Al-Sahafi |
| 32 | DF | KSA | Omar Al-Muziel |
| 33 | DF | KSA | Yassin Hamzah |

| No. | Pos. | Nation | Player |
|---|---|---|---|
| 45 | DF | KSA | Abdullah Shuhail |
| 51 | DF | KSA | Majed Al-Khaibari |
| 8 | MF | KSA | Fahad Al-Muwallad |
| 10 | MF | EGY | Mahmoud Kahraba (on loan from Zamalek SC) |
| 11 | MF | KUW | Fahad Al Ansari (on loan from Al-Qadsia) |
| 14 | MF | KSA | Moataz Tombakti |
| 15 | MF | KSA | Jamal Bajandouh |
| 20 | MF | KSA | Turki Al-Khodair |
| 21 | MF | KSA | Ahmed Al-Aoufi |
| 23 | MF | CHI | Carlos Villanueva |
| 29 | MF | KSA | Sultan Mendash |
| 35 | MF | KSA | Yahya Khormi |
| 50 | MF | KSA | Qusai Al-Khaibari |
| 9 | FW | TUN | Ahmed Akaïchi |
| 26 | FW | KSA | Abdulaziz Al-Aryani |
| 49 | FW | KSA | Abdulrahman Al-Ghamdi |

== Pre-season and friendlies ==
| v |

| v |

== Competitions ==
=== Overall ===
| Competition | Started round | Current position / round | Final position / round | First match | Last match |
|---|---|---|---|---|---|
| Professional League | Round 1 | — | — | 11 August 2016 | — |
| Crown Prince Cup | Round of 32 | Quarter-finals | — | 15 August 2016 | — |
| King Cup | Round of 32 | Round of 32 | — | — | — |
| 2017 Champions League | Group stage | Group stage | — | 20/21 February 2017 | — |

Last Updated: 28 September 2016

=== Pro League ===
==== League table ====
| Pos | Team | Pld | W | D | L | GF | GA | GD | Pts | Qualification or relegation |
|---|---|---|---|---|---|---|---|---|---|---|
| 2 | Al-Ahli | 26 | 17 | 4 | 5 | 57 | 30 | +27 | 55 | Qualification to AFC Champions League group stage |
| 3 | Al-Nassr | 26 | 16 | 4 | 6 | 44 | 25 | +19 | 52 (Note: Al-Nassr finished ahead of Al-Ittihad on head-to-head points: Al-Ittihad 0–1 Al-Nassr, Al-Nassr 1–1 Al-Ittihad) | |
| 4 | Al-Ittihad (Note: Al-Ittihad were docked 3 points for failing to pay over debts.) | 26 | 17 | 4 | 5 | 57 | 37 | +20 | 52 | |
| 5 | Al-Raed | 26 | 11 | 2 | 13 | 37 | 47 | −10 | 35 | |
| 6 | Al-Shabab | 26 | 8 | 9 | 9 | 28 | 32 | −4 | 33 | |

Updated to match(es) played on 4 May 2017. Source: slstat.com
Rules for classification: 1) Points; 2) Head-to-head points; 3) Head-to-head goal difference; 4) Total goal difference; 5) Total goals scored; 6) Play-off (only for deciding champion, relegation and AFC competitions participation).

==== Results summary ====
| Overall | | | | | | | | Home | | | | | | Away | | | | | |
| Pld | W | D | L | GF | GA | GD | Pts | W | D | L | GF | GA | GD | W | D | L | GF | GA | GD |
|---|---|---|---|---|---|---|---|---|---|---|---|---|---|---|---|---|---|---|---|
| 26 | 17 | 4 | 5 | 57 | 37 | +20 | 55 | 7 | 2 | 4 | 25 | 20 | +5 | 10 | 2 | 1 | 32 | 17 | +15 |

Last updated: 4 May 2017.
Source: Competitive matches

==== Results by round ====
| Round | 1 | 2 | 3 | 4 | 5 | 6 | 7 | 8 | 9 | 10 | 11 | 12 | 13 | 14 | 15 | 16 | 17 | 18 | 19 | 20 | 21 | 22 | 23 | 24 | 25 | 26 |
|---|---|---|---|---|---|---|---|---|---|---|---|---|---|---|---|---|---|---|---|---|---|---|---|---|---|---|
| Ground | A | A | A | A | H | H | A | H | H | A | H | A | H | H | H | H | H | A | A | H | A | A | H | A | H | A |
| Result | W | W | W | D | W | L | W | W | L | W | W | W | W | W | D | W | L | W | W | L | W | D | W | W | D | L |
| Position | 5 | 3 | 1 | 1 | 1 | 2 | 2 | 2 | 3 | 3 | 3 | 3 | 3 | 3 | 3 | 3 | 4 | 4 | 4 | 4 | 4 | 4 | 3 | 2 | 4 | 4 |

Updated to match(es) played on 4 May 2017. Source: Competitive matches
A = Away; H = Home; W = Win; D = Draw; L = Loss

==== Matches ====
All times are local, AST (UTC+3).

Win Draw Loss Postponed

| 11 August 2016 1 | Al-Raed | 2–3 | Al-Ittihad | Buraidah |
| 21:05 | S. Al-Bishi (yellow card) 16', (goal) 81'; Al-Sherif (yellow card) 60'; Gilmar 89' | Report | F. Al-Muwallad 54', 65'; Kahraba 73' | Stadium: King Abdullah Sport City Stadium; Attendance: 7,017; Referee: Khaled Salwi |

| 20 August 2016 2 | Al-Khaleej | 2–3 | Al-Ittihad | Khobar |
| 21:05 | López 18' (pen.); Al Salem 47'; Sami (yellow card) 68' | Report | Villanueva 10', (yellow card) 62' (yellow-red card) 90+4'; Al-Aryani 67'; Al-Daheem 79'; Al-Nakhli (yellow card) 86' | Stadium: Prince Saud bin Jalawi Stadium; Attendance: 3,027; Referee: Faisal Al-Blwi |

| 18 September 2016 3 | Al-Wehda | 3–5 | Al-Ittihad | Makkah |
| 20:45 | Madkhali 23' (pen.); Mahboob (yellow card) 28'; Al-Musa (yellow card) 45'; Al-Mor 69'; Dagoulou (yellow card) 86'; Al-Harbi 90+5' | Report | Kahraba 15', 45+1', 62', 81'; Akaïchi 65'; Al-Daheem (yellow card) 66'; Khrees (yellow card) 73'; Mendash (yellow card) 75'; Bajandouh (yellow card) 90+2' | Stadium: King Abdul Aziz Stadium; Attendance: 3,270; Referee: Mohammed Al-Hoaish |

| 23 September 2016 4 | Al-Ahli | 1–1 | Al-Ittihad | Jeddah |
| 20:45 | Bassas (yellow card) 3'; Al-Nakhli 74' (o.g.) | Report | Kahraba (yellow card) 14'; F. Al-Muwallad 78' | Stadium: King Abdullah Sports City; Attendance: 49,732; Referee: Khaled Salwi |

| 14 October 2016 5 | Al-Ittihad | 3-1 | Al-Taawoun | Jeddah |
| 20:15 | Fallatah (yellow card) 18'; Al-Muwallad 53' 74' (pen.); Qassem (yellow card) 61'; Kahraba 90+4' | Report | Al-Absi (yellow card) 17'; Kanno (yellow card) 44'; Sandro Manoel 62' (pen.) | Stadium: King Abdullah Sports City; Attendance: 17,571; Referee: (Saudi Arabia) Khaled Al Teris |

| 20 October 2016 6 | Al-Ittihad | 0-1 | Al-Shabab | Jeddah |
| 20:15 | Fallatah (yellow card) 80' | Report | Benyettou 36'; Bahebri (yellow card) 38'; Al Asta (yellow card) 54'; Heberty (yellow card) 87' | Stadium: King Abdullah Sports City; Attendance: 32,196; Referee: (Saudi Arabia) Abdulrahman Al Sultan |

| 28 October 2016 7 | Al-Hilal | 0-2 | Al-Ittihad | Riyadh |
| 20:00 | Al-Shalhoub (yellow card) 90' | Report | Al-Nakhli (yellow card) 50'; Assiri 56'; Al-Aryani 78' (yellow card) 86' | Stadium: King Fahd International Stadium; Attendance: 35,033; Referee: (Turkey) Cüneyt Çakιr |

| 3 November 2016 8 | Al-Ittihad | 2-0 | Al-Batin | Jeddah |
| 20:00 | Al-Sumairi (yellow card) 60'; Fallatah 72'; Al-Muwallad 80' | Report | Al-Enezi (yellow card) 2' | Stadium: King Abdullah Sports City; Attendance: 16,898; Referee: (Saudi Arabia) Fahad Al Mirdasi |

| 20 November 2016 9 | Al-Ittihad | 0-1 | Al-Nassr | Jeddah |
| 19:55 | Al-Aryani (yellow card) 43'; Assiri (yellow card) 88'; Al-Sumairi (yellow card) 90+4' | Report | Ayala 13'; Al-Najei (yellow card) 90+4' | Stadium: King Abdullah Sports City; Attendance: 23,038; Referee: (Slovenia) Damir Skomina |

| 26 November 2016 10 | Al-Qadisiyah | 0-3 | Al-Ittihad | Dammam |
| 19:50 | Bismark Ferreira (yellow card) 85' | Report | Al-Muwallad 6'; Kahraba 34' (pen.); Al Ansari (yellow card) 44'; Akaïchi 74' | Stadium: Prince Mohamed bin Fahd Stadium; Attendance: 3,733; Referee: (Saudi Arabia) Khaled Salwi |

| 2 December 2016 11 | Al-Ittihad | 4-1 | Al-Ettifaq | Jeddah |
| 19:40 | Kahraba 2' (yellow card) 2' (goal) 90+3'; Villanueva (yellow card) 27'; Al-Muwallad 54'; Al-Dossari 63' (o.g.); Al-Muziel (yellow card) 64' | Report | Kadesh (yellow card) 24'; Otain (yellow card) 38'; Bouba 45+1'; Kanno (yellow card) 77' | Stadium: King Abdullah Sports City; Attendance: 28,532; Referee: (Saudi Arabia) Turki Al Khudair |

| 10 December 2016 12 | Al-Faisaly | 2-4 | Al-Ittihad | Al Majma'ah |
| 19:45 | Luis Gustavo Da Silva 11'; Al-Sowayed (yellow card) 66'; Cabrera 70'; Hamzi (yellow card) 81'; Fallatah (yellow card) 87' | Report | Al-Muwallad (yellow card) 20' (goal) 26'; Kahraba 38'; Akaïchi 64'; Al Ansari 64' | Stadium: King Salman Sport City Stadium; Attendance: 1,402; Referee: (Saudi Arabia) Shukri Al Hanfosh |

| 16 December 2016 13 | Al-Ittihad | 3-2 | Al-Fateh | Jeddah |
| 19:45 | Kahraba 11'; Khrees (yellow card) 38'; Assiri (yellow card) 45' (yellow-red card); Al Ansari 65' (yellow card) 90+2'; Akaïchi 90+6' | Report | Ukra 6' (pen.) 21'; Al-Fuhaid (yellow card) 12'; Buhimed (yellow card) 63' | Stadium: King Abdullah Sports City; Attendance: 22,094; Referee: (Saudi Arabia) Khaled Al Sinany |

| 23 December 2016 14 | Al-Ittihad | 3-2 | Al-Raed FC | Jeddah |
| 19:45 | Al-Muwallad 21' (pen.); Kahraba 62'; Villanueva (yellow card) 68'; Al Ansari 81' (yellow card) 90+2' | Summary | Al Mowalad (yellow card) 36' (goal) 51'; Al-Habib 47'; Al-Showaish (yellow card) 60' | Stadium: King Abdullah Sports City; Attendance: 32,800; Referee: (Saudi Arabia) Khaled Al Teris |

| 3 January 2017 15 | Al-Ittihad | 1-1 | Khaleej FC | Jeddah |
| 19:50 | Fahad Al-Muwallad 36'; Villanueva (yellow card) 40' | Report | Faisel Al-Kharaa (yellow card) 39'; Abdullah Al-Salem 69'; Talal Majrashi (yellow card) 74'; Shafi Al-Dossari (yellow card) 77' | Stadium: King Abdullah Sports City; Attendance: 15,179; Referee: (Saudi Arabia) Abdulrahman Al Shehri |

| 28 January 2017 16 | Al-Ittihad | 1-0 | Al-Wehda | Jeddah |
| 20:15 | Rabee Sufyani 43' | Report | Hatem Belal (yellow card) 46'; Mansor Al-Najar (yellow card) 88' (yellow-red card) | Stadium: King Abdullah Sports City; Attendance: 18,197; Referee: (Saudi Arabia) Saleh Al Hathlool |

| 3 February 2017 17 | Al-Ittihad | 1-4 | Al-Ahli | Jeddah |
| 19:20 | Adnan Fallatah 2'; Bader Al-Nakhli (yellow card) 6'; Fahad Al-Muwallad (yellow card) 42'; Awadh Khrees (yellow card) 50'; Fahad Al Ansari (yellow card) 78' | Report | Salman Al-Moasher (yellow card) 6'; Fetfatzidis 41' (yellow card) 59'; Muhannad Assiri 48'; Taisir Al-Jassim (yellow card) 52'; Abdulfattah Asiri 62'; Saeed Al Mowalad 87' | Stadium: King Abdullah Sports City; Attendance: 52,909; Referee: (Netherlands) Kevin Blom |

| 11 February 2017 18 | Al-Taawoun | 1-2 | Al-Ittihad | Buraidah |
| 19:15 | Mohammed Al-Saiari (yellow card) 41'; Naif Al-Mousa (yellow card) 58'; Saeed Al-Dossari 64'; Abdulrahman Al-Barakah (yellow card) 74'; Mohammed Abousaban (yellow card) 80' (red card) 80'; Ahmed Al-Zein (yellow card) 90+2' | Report | Fahad Al Ansari 56'; Villanueva 59' | Stadium: King Abdullah Sport City Stadium; Attendance: 11,515; Referee: (Saudi Arabia) Shukri Al Hanfosh |

| 18 February 2017 19 | Al-Shabab | 0-2 | Al-Ittihad | Riyadh |
| 19:25 | Benlamri (yellow card) 73'; Abdullah Al-Fahad (yellow card) 73'; Saud Kariri (yellow card) 80' | Report | Omar Al-Muziel (yellow card) 51'; Adnan Fallatah 61'; Kahraba 73' | Stadium: Prince Faisal bin Fahd Stadium; Attendance: 4,938; Referee: (Saudi Arabia) Turki Al Khudair |

| 5 March 2017 20 | Al-Ittihad | 1-3 | Al Hilal | Jeddah |
| 19:30 | Fahad Al Ansari (yellow card) 22'; Akaïchi 38' (yellow card) 61'; Adnan Fallatah (yellow card) 61'; Omar Al-Muziel (yellow card) 72'; Kahraba (yellow card) 90'; Fahad Al-Muwallad (red card) 90' | Report | Osama Hawsawi (yellow card) 22'; Carlos Eduardo 56'; Mohammed Al-Breik (yellow card) 61'; Omar Kharbin (yellow card) 61' (goal) 83'; Nawaf Al Abed (yellow card) 90+2' (goal) 90+5' (pen.) | Stadium: King Abdullah Sports City; Attendance: 53,661; Referee: (Sweden) Jonas Eriksson (referee) |

| 14 March 2017 21 | Al-Batin | 0-1 | Al-Ittihad | Hafar al-Batin |
| 17:40 | Tarabai (yellow card) 15'; Maan Khodari (yellow card) 90+4' | Report | Mohammed Qassem (yellow card) 17'; Akaïchi 59'; Ammar Al-Najar (yellow card) 90' | Stadium: Al-Batin Club Stadium; Attendance: 4,002; Referee: (Saudi Arabia) Mohammed Al Qarni |

| 7 April 2017 22 | Al-Nassr | 1-1 | Al-Ittihad | Riyadh |
| 20:40 | Ibrahim Ghaleb (yellow card) 52'; Ayala (yellow card) 66'; Bruno Uvini (yellow card) 83'; Waleed Abdullah (yellow card) 83'; Hassan Al-Raheb 90' (yellow card) 90+3' | Report | Kahraba 18'; Fahad Al Ansari (yellow card) 38' | Stadium: King Fahd International Stadium; Attendance: 4,652; Referee: (Saudi Arabia) Mohammed Al Hoaish |

| 14 April 2017 23 | Al-Ittihad | 4-2 | Al-Qadisiyah | Jeddah |
| 20:45 | Akaïchi 4' 59'; Omar Al-Muziel (yellow card) 16'; Fawaz Al-Qarni (yellow card) 45+1'; Kahraba 45+2'; Ammar Al-Najar 90+4' | Report | Bismark Ferreira 35' 64'; Wesam Wahib (yellow card) 73'; Yassin Barnawi (yellow card) 90+2' | Stadium: King Abdullah Sports City; Attendance: 6,686; Referee: (Saudi Arabia) Shukri Al Hanfosh |

| 21 April 2017 24 | Al-Ettifaq FC | 1-4 | Al-Ittihad | Dammam |
| 20:45 | Hazaa Al-Hazaa 90+1' (pen.) | Report | Villanueva 42'; Kahraba 61'; Mohammed Qassem 70'; Akaïchi 85' | Stadium: Prince Mohamed bin Fahd Stadium; Attendance: 6,068; Referee: (Saudi Arabia) Khaled Salwi |

| 29 April 2017 25 | Al-Ittihad | 2-2 | Al-Faisaly | Jeddah |
| 20:50 | Jamal Bajandouh (yellow card) 27'; Ammar Al-Najar 31'; Rabee Sufyani 75'; Kahraba (yellow card) 90' | Report | Mustafa Malayekah (yellow card) 31'; Axente 43'; Mansor Hamzi 63'; Ahmad Abbas (yellow card) 90+3' | Stadium: King Abdullah Sports City; Attendance: 10,530; Referee: (Saudi Arabia) Turki Al Khudair |

| 4 May 2017 26 | Al-Fateh | 4-1 | Al-Ittihad | Al-Hasa |
| 20:50 | Nooh Al-Mousa 11'; Hamad Al-Juahaim 14'; Sandro Manoel 32'; Tawfiq Buhumaid (yellow card) 40'; Ali Al Bulaihi (yellow card) 65'; Chehoudi (yellow card) 73' (goal) 90+1' | Report | Villanueva (yellow card) 45+2'; Ammar Al-Najar 62'; Omar Al-Muziel (yellow card) 87' | Stadium: Prince Abdullah bin Jalawi Stadium; Attendance: 8,022; Referee: (Saudi Arabia) Saleh Al Hathlool |

=== Crown Prince Cup ===
All times are local, AST (UTC+3).

| 15 August 2016 Round of 32 | Al-Ittihad | 3–2 | Al-Jeel | Makkah |
| 20:55 | F. Al-Muwallad 13' (pen.); Villanueva 68'; Al-Daheem 88' | | Douglas Cruz 3' (pen.); Adam 51' | Stadium: King Abdul Aziz Stadium; Referee: Khaled Al-Senani |

| 28 September 2016 Round of 16 | Al-Ittihad | 1–1 (a.e.t.) (8–7 p) | Al-Qadisiyah | Jeddah |
| 20:15 | Villanueva 42'; Kahraba (yellow card) 51'; Tombakti (yellow card) 56'; Assiri (yellow card) 90+4' | | N. Hazazi 12'; Abdul-Amir (yellow card) 38'; Barnawi (yellow card) 45+4' | Stadium: King Abdullah Sports City; Referee: Mishari Al-Mishari |
| | Penalties |
| | Akaïchi (penalty scored); Al Ansari (penalty missed); Al-Muwallad (penalty scored); Villanueva (penalty scored); Al-Daheem (penalty scored); Al-Nakhli (penalty scored); Al-Muziel (penalty scored); Bajandouh (penalty scored); Al-Qarni (penalty scored) | | (penalty scored) Bezerra; (penalty scored) N. Hazazi; (penalty missed) Al-Shoeil; (penalty scored) Fallatah; (penalty scored) Abdul-Amir; (penalty scored) Al-Khabrani; (penalty scored) Abo Shararah; (penalty scored) Al-Najrani; (penalty missed) Masrahi |

| 24 October 2016 Quarter-finals | Al-Batin | 0-1 | Al-Ittihad | Hafar al-Batin |
| 18:00 | Nasser (yellow card) 13'; Freeh (yellow card) 57' | Summary | Al-Muwallad 58' (pen.); Al-Muziel (yellow card) 65'; Assiri (yellow card) 67'; Villanueva (yellow card) 83'; Al-Qarni (yellow card) 90+3' | Stadium: Al-Batin Club Stadium; Referee: (Saudi Arabia) Shukri Al Hanfosh |

| 27 December 2016 Semi-finals | Al-Ittihad | 3-2 | Al-Ahli | Jeddah |
| 19:50 | Ahmed Akaïchi 28'; Kahraba 38'; Bajandouh (yellow card) 62'; Al-Muwallad (yellow card) 81' (goal) 90'; Al-Nakhli (yellow card) 84' | Summary | Waleed Bakshween (yellow card) 43'; Al Somah 72' 77' (pen.); Hamad (yellow card) 81'; Ageel Balghaith (yellow card) 89' | Stadium: King Abdullah Sports City; Referee: (Saudi Arabia) Mohammed Al Hoaish |

| 10 March 2017 Final | Al-Nassr | 0-1 | Al-Ittihad | Riyadh |
| 20.35 | Omar Hawsawi (yellow card) 67'; Bruno Uvini (yellow card) 90+5' | Report | Kahraba 16'; Adnan Fallatah (yellow card) 56'; Awadh Khrees (yellow card) 74'; Akaïchi (yellow card) 90+4' | Stadium: King Fahd International Stadium; Referee: (England) Mark Clattenburg |

=== King Cup ===
| 20 January 2017 Round of 32 | Al-Ta'ee | 2 - 1 (a.e.t.) | Ittihad FC | Ha'il |
| 15:50 | | Report | | Stadium: Prince Abdul Aziz bin Musa'ed Stadium |

== Statistics ==
=== Goalscorers ===
| Rank | No. | Pos | Nat | Name | League | Crown Prince Cup | King Cup | 2017 CL | Total |
|---|---|---|---|---|---|---|---|---|---|
| 1 | 10 | MF | (Egypt) | Kahraba | 5 | 0 | 0 | 0 | 5 |
| 2 | 8 | MF | (Saudi Arabia) | Fahad Al-Muwallad | 3 | 1 | 0 | 0 | 4 |
| 3 | 23 | MF | (Chile) | Carlos Villanueva | 1 | 2 | 0 | 0 | 3 |
| 4 | 24 | DF | (Saudi Arabia) | Ammar Al-Daheem | 1 | 1 | 0 | 0 | 2 |
| 5 | 9 | FW | (Tunisia) | Ahmed Akaïchi | 1 | 0 | 0 | 0 | 1 |
| 5 | 26 | FW | (Saudi Arabia) | Abdulaziz Al-Aryani | 1 | 0 | 0 | 0 | 1 |
| Total | | | | | 12 | 4 | 0 | 0 | 16 |

Last Updated: 28 September 2016

=== Clean sheets ===
| Rank | No. | Pos | Nat | Name | League | Crown Prince Cup | King Cup | 2017 CL | Total |
|---|---|---|---|---|---|---|---|---|---|
| Total | | | | | 0 | 0 | 0 | 0 | 0 |

Last Updated: 31 August 2016
