= 2019–20 Al-Fayha FC season =

Al-Fayha
2019–20 season
- Chairman: Abdullah Abanmy
- Manager: Jorge Simão
- Stadium: Al Majma'ah Sports City
- Pro League: 14th (relegated)
- King Cup: Round of 16
- Top goalscorer: League: Ronnie Fernández; Samuel Owusu (7 each); All: Ronnie Fernández (9)
- Highest home attendance: 5,752 vs Al-Hazem (29 August 2019)
- Lowest home attendance: 2,586 vs Al-Ittihad (19 December 2019)
- Average home league attendance: 4,144
Home colours	Away colours	Third colours
- All statistics correct as of 9 September 2020.

The 2019–20 season was Al-Fayha's 3rd season in the Pro League and their 66th season in existence. The club participated in the Pro League and the King Cup.

The season covered the period from 1 July 2019 to 9 September 2020.

== Players ==
=== Squad information ===
As of 1 February 2020

Note: Flags indicate national team as defined under FIFA eligibility rules; some limited exceptions apply. Players may hold more than one non-FIFA nationality.

No.	Pos.	Nation	Player
1	GK	KSA	Moslem Al Freej
2	DF	KSA	Mukhair Al-Rashidi
3	DF	KSA	Bander Nasser
4	DF	KSA	Sami Al-Khaibari (captain)
6	DF	CPV	Gegé
7	FW	CHA	Othman Alhaj (on loan from Al-Ahli)
8	MF	BRA	Ângelo Neto (on loan from São Caetano)
9	FW	CHI	Ronnie Fernández
10	MF	KSA	Abdullah Al-Mutairi
11	FW	KSA	Hamad Al-Juhaim
12	MF	KSA	Abdulkareem Al-Qahtani
14	MF	KSA	Mohanad Fallatah
16	MF	KSA	Abdulrahman Al-Barakah
17	DF	KSA	Hani Al-Sebyani (on loan from Al-Ahli)

No.	Pos.	Nation	Player
18	MF	KSA	Hassan Jaafari
19	MF	GHA	Samuel Owusu
20	MF	CHI	Carlos Villanueva
21	MF	KSA	Muhannad Awadh
22	GK	KSA	Fahad Al-Shammari
23	DF	KSA	Awn Al-Saluli (on loan from Al-Ittihad)
24	DF	KSA	Ahmed Bamsaud
27	DF	KSA	Abdullah Kanno
28	FW	MAD	Faneva Andriatsima
33	DF	KSA	Mohammed Al-Baqawi (on loan from Al-Shabab)
35	GK	KSA	Hamad Hawsawi
55	DF	KSA	Nawaf Al-Sobhi
77	MF	POR	Arsénio
99	GK	JOR	Amer Shafi

=== Out on loan ===
Note: Flags indicate national team as defined under FIFA eligibility rules; some limited exceptions apply. Players may hold more than one non-FIFA nationality.

No. / Pos. / Nation / Player; 32 / DF / KSA / Omar Al-Muziel (at Abha until 30 June 2020)	No. / Pos. / Nation / Player; — / DF / KSA / Abdulaziz Al-Mansor (at Al-Ain until 30 June 2020)

== Transfers and loans ==
=== Transfers in ===
Entry date	Position	No.	Player	From club	Fee	Ref.
30 May 2019	DF	32	(Saudi Arabia) Omar Al-Muziel	(Saudi Arabia) Al-Ittihad	Free	
13 June 2019	MF	14	(Saudi Arabia) Mohanad Fallatah	(Saudi Arabia) Al-Hilal	Free	
3 July 2019	FW	11	(Saudi Arabia) Hamad Al-Juhaim	(Saudi Arabia) Al-Fateh	Free	
6 July 2019	DF	3	(Saudi Arabia) Bander Nasser	(Saudi Arabia) Al-Batin	$535,000	
8 August 2019	MF	21	(Saudi Arabia) Muhannad Awadh	(Saudi Arabia) Al-Kawkab	Free	
8 August 2019	MF	77	(Portugal) Arsénio	(Portugal) Moreirense	Free	
19 August 2019	MF	19	(Ghana) Samuel Owusu	(Serbia) Čukarički	$1,665,000	
15 January 2020	MF	20	(Chile) Carlos Villanueva	(Saudi Arabia) Al-Ittihad	Free	
11 February 2020	FW	9	(Madagascar) Faneva Andriatsima	(Saudi Arabia) Abha	Free	

=== Loans in ===
Start date	End date	Position	No.	Player	From club	Fee	Ref.
6 July 2019	24 January 2020	MF	5	(Brazil) Rafael Assis	(Portugal) Braga	None	
8 July 2019	End of season	MF	8	(Brazil) Ângelo Neto	(Brazil) São Caetano	None	
1 August 2019	End of season	DF	23	(Saudi Arabia) Awn Al-Saluli	(Saudi Arabia) Al-Ittihad	None	
4 August 2019	End of season	DF	17	(Saudi Arabia) Hani Al-Sebyani	(Saudi Arabia) Al-Ahli	None	
31 August 2019	End of season	FW	7	(Chad) Othman Alhaj	(Saudi Arabia) Al-Fayha	None	
28 January 2020	End of season	DF	33	(Saudi Arabia) Mohammed Al-Baqawi	(Saudi Arabia) Al-Shabab	None	

=== Transfers out ===
Exit date	Position	No.	Player	To club	Fee	Ref.
5 May 2019	MF	11	(Saudi Arabia) Abdullah Al Salem	(Saudi Arabia) Al-Nassr	$1,600,000	
17 June 2019	MF	50	(Saudi Arabia) Talal Majrashi	(Saudi Arabia) Al-Ain	Free	
1 July 2019	DF	25	(Saudi Arabia) Tawfiq Buhimed	(Saudi Arabia) Al-Fateh	Free	
2 July 2019	MF	5	(Greece) Alexandros Tziolis		Released	
4 July 2019	MF	44	(Saudi Arabia) Hatem Belal	(Saudi Arabia) Al-Wehda	Free	
5 July 2019	FW	–	(Saudi Arabia) Mohammed Al-Menqash	(Saudi Arabia) Al-Nahda	Free	
14 July 2019	FW	90	(Saudi Arabia) Nayef Abdali	(Saudi Arabia) Al-Taqadom	Free	
16 July 2019	GK	23	(Colombia) Cristian Bonilla		Released	
3 August 2019	FW	–	(Saudi Arabia) Mutaeb Al-Najrani	(Saudi Arabia) Al-Khaleej	Free	
9 August 2019	FW	33	(Tunisia) Amine Chermiti	(India) Mumbai City	Free	
19 August 2019	DF	–	(Saudi Arabia) Radhi Al-Mutairi	(Saudi Arabia) Al-Shoulla	Free	
20 August 2019	MF	29	(Sweden) Nahir Besara	(Cyprus) Pafos	Free	
28 August 2019	DF	13	(Saudi Arabia) Abdulaziz Majrashi	(Saudi Arabia) Al-Adalah	Free	
1 February 2020	MF	14	(Saudi Arabia) Moataz Tombakti	(Saudi Arabia) Al-Ain	Free	

=== Loans out ===
Start date	End date	Position	No.	Player	To club	Fee	Ref.
20 June 2019	End of season	DF	–	(Saudi Arabia) Abdulaziz Al-Mansor	(Saudi Arabia) Al-Ain	None	
28 January 2020	End of season	DF	32	(Saudi Arabia) Omar Al-Muziel	(Saudi Arabia) Abha	None	

== Pre-season ==
20 July 2019 Friendly	Al-Fayha (Saudi Arabia)	4–0	(Netherlands) RVSD	Haamstede, Netherlands
18:30 CEST	Ba Masoud 4', 64'; Al-Qahtani 35'; Jaafari 54'	Report		Stadium: Sportpark Van Zuijen

24 July 2019 Friendly	Al-Fayha (Saudi Arabia)	1–1	(Netherlands) ASWH	Haamstede, Netherlands
18:30 CEST	Ângelo Neto 68'	Report	63'	Stadium: Sportpark Van Zuijen

30 July 2019 Friendly	Al-Fayha (Saudi Arabia)	1–0	(Greece) OFI Crete	Haamstede, Netherlands
19:00 CEST	Ângelo Neto 17'	Report		Stadium: Sportpark Van Zuijen

5 August 2019 Friendly	Al-Fayha (Saudi Arabia)	0–1	(United Arab Emirates) Sharjah	Oudenbosch, Netherlands
19:00 CEST		Report	Mendes 33'

17 August 2019 Friendly	Al-Fayha (Saudi Arabia)	0–1	(Saudi Arabia) Al-Taawoun	Buraidah, Saudi Arabia
19:15 AST		Report	Petrolina 20' (pen.)	Stadium: Al-Taawoun Club Stadium

== Competitions ==
=== Overall ===
Competition	Started round	Final position / round	First match	Last match
Pro League	—	14th	24 August 2019	9 September 2020
King Cup	Round of 64	Round of 16	4 November 2019	2 January 2020

Updated to match played 9 September 2020
Source: Competitions

=== Overview ===
Competition	Record							
Competition	G	W	D	L	GF	GA	GD	Win %
Pro League	30	8	8	14	34	44	−10	26.67
King Cup	3	2	0	1	8	1	+7	66.67
Total	33	10	8	15	42	45	−3	30.30

Updated to match played 9 September 2020
Source: Competitions

=== Pro League ===
==== League table ====
Pos	Team	Pld	W	D	L	GF	GA	GD	Pts	Qualification or relegation
12	Al-Taawoun	30	10	5	15	33	40	−7	35 (Note: Positions determined by head-to-head points: Damac: 9 pts; Al-Ittihad: 6 pts; Al-Taawoun: 3 pts.)	
13	Al-Fateh	30	8	9	13	42	49	−7	33	
14	Al-Fayha (R)	30	8	8	14	34	44	−10	32	Relegation to Prince Mohammad bin Salman League
15	Al-Hazem (R)	30	7	6	17	40	61	−21	27	Relegation to Prince Mohammad bin Salman League
16	Al-Adalah (R)	30	4	9	17	27	62	−35	21	Relegation to Prince Mohammad bin Salman League

Updated to match(es) played on 9 September 2020. Source: spl.com
Rules for classification: 1) Points; 2) Head-to-head points; 3) Head-to-head goal difference; 4) Total goal difference; 5) Total goals scored; 6) Fair-play points (Note: Head-to-head record is used only after all the matches between the teams in question have been played).
(R) Relegated

==== Results summary ====
Overall								Home						Away					
Pld	W	D	L	GF	GA	GD	Pts	W	D	L	GF	GA	GD	W	D	L	GF	GA	GD
30	8	8	14	34	44	−10	32	6	4	5	21	20	+1	2	4	9	13	24	−11

Last updated: 9 September 2020.

==== Results by round ====
Round	1	2	3	4	5	6	7	8	9	10	11	12	13	14	15	16	17	18	19	20	21	22	23	24	25	26	27	28	29	30
Ground	A	H	A	H	A	H	A	H	H	A	A	H	H	A	H	H	A	H	A	H	A	H	A	A	H	H	A	A	H	A
Result	D	W	D	L	L	L	D	W	D	W	L	W	L	D	D	W	L	L	W	W	L	L	L	L	D	D	L	L	W	L
Position	11	6	5	9	12	14	13	12	12	11	12	9	11	11	10	10	10	11	9	9	9	11	11	11	11	11	13	13	13	14

Updated to match(es) played on 9 September 2020. Source:
A = Away; H = Home; W = Win; D = Draw; L = Loss

==== Matches ====
All times are local, AST (UTC+3).

Win Draw Loss Postponed

24 August 2019 1	Al-Faisaly	0–0	Al-Fayha	Al Majma'ah
19:05	Silva (yellow card) 15'; Bonevacia (yellow card) 40'; Kaabi (yellow card) 58'; Qassem (yellow card) 90+1'	Report	Fernández (yellow card) 42'; Assis (yellow card) 82'	Stadium: Al Majma'ah Sports City; Attendance: 3,945; Referee: Matthew Conger (New Zealand)

29 August 2019 2	Al-Fayha	2–1	Al-Hazem	Al Majma'ah
20:20	Al-Muziel (yellow card) 38'; Al-Qahtani (yellow card) 45+1', (goal) 45+5'; Fernández (yellow card) 52', (goal) 90'; Al-Khaibari (yellow card) 78'	Report	Al-Yami (yellow card) 18', (goal) 43'; Hamzi (yellow card) 82'; Al-Shammari (yellow card) 86'	Stadium: Al Majma'ah Sports City; Attendance: 5,752; Referee: Damir Skomina (Slovenia)

14 September 2019 3	Al-Hilal	1–1	Al-Fayha	Riyadh
18:40	Al-Abed 50'; Cuéllar (yellow card) 74'; Carrillo (yellow card) 87'	Report	Al-Qahtani (yellow card) 18'; Al-Muziel (yellow card) 89'; Assis (yellow card) 90+2'; Arsénio 90+4', (yellow card) 90+5'	Stadium: King Saud University Stadium; Attendance: 15,561; Referee: Krzysztof Jakubik (Poland)

20 September 2019 4	Al-Fayha	0–1	Al-Wehda	Al Majma'ah
18:35	Neto (yellow card) 26'; Ba Masoud (yellow card) 80'	Report	Al-Khulaif (yellow card) 22'; Anselmo (yellow card) 24'; Goodwin 78'	Stadium: Al Majma'ah Sports City; Attendance: 4,237; Referee: Richard Martens (Netherlands)

28 September 2019 5	Al-Raed	2–0	Al-Fayha	Buraidah
20:15	Pérez 20'; Fouzair (yellow card) 22'; Palomeque (yellow card) 23'; Doukha (yellow card) 58'; Al-Zain 61'	Report	Owusu (yellow card) 45+1'; Neto (yellow card) 50'; Ba Masoud (yellow card) 88'; Arsénio (red card) 90+1'	Stadium: King Abdullah Sport City Stadium; Attendance: 3,193; Referee: Kevin Blom (Netherlands)

5 October 2019 6	Al-Fayha	0–3	Al-Ahli	Al Majma'ah
18:20	Assis (yellow card) 20'; Al-Barakah (yellow card) 55'	Report	Al-Mousa (yellow card) 13'; Djaniny 23'; Hindi 45+5'; Al Somah 52'	Stadium: Al Majma'ah Sports City; Attendance: 3,993; Referee: Bobby Madden (Scotland)

20 October 2019 7	Abha	1–1	Al-Fayha	Abha
18:25	Al Abbas 10'	Report	Neto (yellow card) 53'; Fernández 58'	Stadium: Prince Sultan bin Abdul Aziz Stadium; Attendance: 1,529; Referee: Matthew Conger (New Zealand)

25 October 2019 8	Al-Fayha	3–1	Al-Fateh	Al Majma'ah
18:00	Nasser (yellow card) 20'; Owusu 48', (yellow card) 84'; Al-Khaibari 51'; Fernández 75', (yellow card) 76'	Report	Saâdane 20' (pen.)	Stadium: Al Majma'ah Sports City; Attendance: 3,802; Referee: António Nobre (Portugal)

31 October 2019 9	Al-Fayha	1–1	Al-Ettifaq	Al Majma'ah
18:00	Fallatah (yellow card) 40'; Ba Masoud 75'	Report	Al-Hazaa 79'	Stadium: Al Majma'ah Sports City; Attendance: 3,652; Referee: Serdar Gözübüyük (Netherlands)

22 November 2019 10	Al-Shabab	0–1	Al-Fayha	Riyadh
19:40	Ilyas (yellow card) 55'	Report	Owusu 60'	Stadium: Prince Faisal bin Fahd Stadium; Attendance: 10,118; Referee: Kevin Blom (Netherlands)

14 December 2019 11	Damac	2–1	Al-Fayha	Abha
15:35	Fernández 15' (o.g.); Iajour 45+3'; Al-Dossari (yellow card) 64'; Rahmani (yellow card) 75'; Al-Najei (yellow card) 82'	Report	Neto (yellow card) 45+7'; Al-Rashidi 45+9'; Nasser (yellow card) 52'; Al-Muziel (yellow card) 90+2'	Stadium: Prince Sultan bin Abdul Aziz Stadium; Attendance: 2,136; Referee: Viktor Kassai (Hungary)

19 December 2019 12	Al-Fayha	4–1	Al-Ittihad	Al Majma'ah
15:15	Fernández 3' (pen.), 70' (pen.), 90+1'; Owusu 49'; Fallatah (yellow card) 84'	Report	Romarinho 24'; Al-Daheem (yellow card) 42'; Abdullah (yellow card) 70'; El Ahmadi (yellow card) 79'	Stadium: Al Majma'ah Sports City; Attendance: 2,586; Referee: Svein Oddvar Moen (Norway)

28 December 2019 13	Al-Fayha	1–4	Al-Nassr	Al Majma'ah
15:20	Fernández 11'; Arsénio (yellow card) 26'; Owusu (red card) 43'; Gegé (red card) 70'	Report	Jones (red card) 65'; Hamdallah 73' (pen.), 88', 90+1'; Al-Ghanam 81', (yellow card) 84'; Maicon (yellow card) 90'	Stadium: Al Majma'ah Sports City; Attendance: 4,042; Referee: Artur Soares Dias (Portugal)

9 January 2020 14	Al-Adalah	1–1	Al-Fayha	Al-Hasa
17:45	Andria (yellow card) 41'; Cissé 65'; Al-Burayh (yellow card) 68'; Mathlouthi (yellow card) 90+2'	Report	Neto (yellow card) 75'; Fernández (yellow card) 89'; Al-Sobhi 90+2'	Stadium: Prince Abdullah bin Jalawi Stadium; Attendance: 9,315; Referee: Matej Jug (Slovenia)

24 January 2020 15	Al-Fayha	2–2	Al-Taawoun	Al Majma'ah
15:35	Arsénio (yellow card) 21'; Villanueva 30'; Alhaj 90'	Report	Héldon 19', (yellow card) 40'; Al-Absi 45+6'; Amissi (red card) 75'	Stadium: Al Majma'ah Sports City; Attendance: 4,057; Referee: Faisal Al-Blwi

1 February 2020 16	Al-Fayha	2–1	Al-Faisaly	Al Majma'ah
20:15	Nasser (yellow card) 24'; Villanueva 39'; Al-Barakah (yellow card) 55'; Al-Qahtani 90+1'	Report	El Jebli 36'; Silva (yellow card) 44'; Al-Ghamdi (yellow card) 70'	Stadium: Al Majma'ah Sports City; Attendance: 4,317; Referee: Nick Waldron (New Zealand)

7 February 2020 17	Al-Hazem	4–2	Al-Fayha	Ar Rass
18:30	Strandberg 10'; Cafú 24', (yellow card) 62'; Alemão 34'; Fettouhi 51'; Muralha (yellow card) 71'	Report	Al-Juhaim 39', (yellow card) 43'; Owusu 65'; Al-Sobhi (yellow card) 69'; Al-Qahtani (yellow card) 90+3'	Stadium: Al-Hazem Club Stadium; Attendance: 3,312; Referee: Anastasios Sidiropoulos (Greece)

13 February 2020 18	Al-Fayha	0–1	Al-Hilal	Al Majma'ah
18:30	Neto (yellow card) 52'; Al-Qahtani (yellow card) 90+4'	Report	Al-Olayan (yellow card) 55'; Carlos Eduardo (yellow card) 62'; Al-Breik 69'	Stadium: Al Majma'ah Sports City; Attendance: 5,488; Referee: Andreas Ekberg (Sweden)

20 February 2020 19	Al-Wehda	0–2	Al-Fayha	Mecca
20:30	Tambakti (yellow card) 67'; Anselmo (yellow card) 73'	Report	Villanueva 28', 69'; Neto (yellow card) 33'; Al-Barakah (yellow card) 87'	Stadium: King Abdul Aziz Stadium; Attendance: 10,150; Referee: Turki Al-Khudhayr

28 February 2020 20	Al-Fayha	3–1	Al-Raed	Al Majma'ah
20:10	Al-Sobhi 43'; Al-Barakah (yellow card) 63'; Gegé 74'; Owusu 79'	Report	Al-Ghamdi 5'; Daoudi (yellow card) 82'; Al-Fahad (yellow card) 86'	Stadium: Al Majma'ah Sports City; Attendance: 3,655; Referee: Georgi Kabakov (Bulgaria)

6 March 2020 21	Al-Ahli	1–0	Al-Fayha	Jeddah
20:40	Al Somah 87'; Djaniny (yellow card) 88'	Report	Al-Sobhi (yellow card) 33'	Stadium: King Abdullah Sports City; Attendance: 10,836; Referee: Slavko Vinčić (Slovenia)

11 March 2020 22	Al-Fayha	0–2	Abha	Al Majma'ah
18:45	Villanueva (yellow card) 62'; Nasser (yellow card) 90+5'	Report	Bguir 29'; Atouchi (yellow card) 63'; Al-Qahtani 80'	Stadium: Al Majma'ah Sports City; Attendance: 0 (Note: Matches from 7 March and onwards will be played behind closed doors due to concerns over the coronavirus outbreak.); Referee: Mohammed Al-Hoaish

4 August 2020 23	Al-Fateh	2–0	Al-Fayha	Al-Hasa
19:00	Buhimed (yellow card) 1'; Saâdane 16' (pen.); Al-Fuhaid (yellow card) 45'; Bendebka 75'; Kanabah (yellow card) 90+3'	Report	Al-Barakah (yellow card) 13'; Neto (yellow card) 44'; Ba Masoud (yellow card) 83'	Stadium: Prince Abdullah bin Jalawi Stadium; Attendance: 0 Referee: Turki Al-Khudhayr

9 August 2020 24	Al-Ettifaq	3–2	Al-Fayha	Dammam
19:00	Mahnashi (yellow card) 48'; Kiss 56' (pen.); Doukara 57'; Hazazi 90+5'	Report	Al-Sobhi 9'; Al-Baqawi (yellow card) 19'; Al-Khaibari 45+1'; Al-Juhaim (yellow card) 90+1'	Stadium: Prince Mohamed bin Fahd Stadium; Attendance: 0 Referee: Mattias Gestranius (Finland)

14 August 2020 25	Al-Fayha	1–1	Al-Shabab	Al Majma'ah
19:10	Andriatsima (yellow card) 20'; Owusu 33'; Al-Barakah (yellow card) 54'	Report	Asprilla 57'; Al-Omran (yellow card) 90'	Stadium: Al Majma'ah Sports City; Attendance: 0 Referee: Nikola Dabanović (Montenegro)

20 August 2020 26	Al-Fayha	0–0	Damac	Al Majma'ah
19:05	Villanueva (yellow card) 45+3'	Report		Stadium: Al Majma'ah Sports City; Attendance: 0 Referee: Bobby Madden (Scotland)

24 August 2020 27	Al-Ittihad	4–1	Al-Fayha	Jeddah
20:50	Romarinho 3', 5'; Al-Muwallad 68' (pen.), 77'; Gil (yellow card) 71'	Report	Neto 28'; Al Freej (yellow card) 66'; Al-Juhaim (yellow card) 81'	Stadium: King Abdullah Sports City; Attendance: 0 Referee: Andrés Cunha (Uruguay)

29 August 2020 28	Al-Nassr	2–1	Al-Fayha	Riyadh
20:40	Hamdallah 10' (pen.), 90+4'	Report	Andriatsima 7'; Al-Sobhi (yellow card) 71'; Al-Rashidi 90+2'	Stadium: Prince Faisal bin Fahd Stadium; Attendance: 0 Referee: Gediminas Mažeika (Lithuania)

4 September 2020 29	Al-Fayha	2–0	Al-Adalah	Al Majma'ah
20:35	Al-Mazidi 16' (o.g.); Owusu 56'; Neto (yellow card) 70'	Report	Al-Nakhli (yellow card) 45+4'; Al-Eisa (yellow card) 45+4'; Al-Yousef (yellow card) 72'; Traoré (yellow card) 73'	Stadium: Al Majma'ah Sports City; Attendance: 0 Referee: Matthew Conger (New Zealand)

9 September 2020 30	Al-Taawoun	1–0	Al-Fayha	Buraidah
20:35	Al-Mousa (yellow card) 38'; Al-Sahlawi 90+2'	Report	Al-Khaibari (yellow card) 15'; Neto (yellow card) 66' (yellow-red card) 68'; Villanueva (yellow card) 69'; Owusu (yellow card) 71'	Stadium: King Abdullah Sport City Stadium; Attendance: 0 Referee: Andrés Cunha (Uruguay)

=== King Cup ===
All times are local, AST (UTC+3).

4 November 2019 Round of 64	Okaz	0–3	Al-Fayha	Mecca
18:25		Report	Neto (yellow card) 32'; Arsénio 34', (yellow card) 64'; Al-Sebyani (yellow card) 52'; Al-Selouli 66'; Al-Mutairi 72'	Stadium: King Abdul Aziz Stadium; Referee: Majed Al-Shamrani

5 December 2019 Round of 32	Al-Fayha	5–0	Al-Dera'a	Al Majma'ah
15:10	Ba Masoud 8'; Fernández 18', 79'; Owusu 55'; Al-Qurashi 65' (o.g.); Assis (yellow card) 89'	Report		Stadium: Al Majma'ah Sports City; Referee: Abdullah Al-Awidan

2 January 2020 Round of 16	Al-Fayha	0–1	Al-Ahli	Al Majma'ah
18:00		Report	Al Somah 82'	Stadium: Al Majma'ah Sports City; Referee: Bas Nijhuis (Netherlands)

== Statistics ==
=== Appearances ===
Last updated on 9 September 2020.

No.	Pos	Nat	Player	Total		Pro League		King Cup	
No.	Pos	Nat	Player	Apps	Goals	Apps	Goals	Apps	Goals
Goalkeepers
1	GK	(Saudi Arabia) KSA	Moslem Al Freej	15	0	14	0	1	0
22	GK	(Saudi Arabia) KSA	Fahad Al-Shammari	0	0	0	0	0	0
Defenders
2	DF	(Saudi Arabia) KSA	Mukhair Al-Rashidi	13	1	11+1	1	1	0
3	DF	(Saudi Arabia) KSA	Bander Nasser	18	0	17	0	1	0
4	DF	(Saudi Arabia) KSA	Sami Al-Khaibari	27	2	24	2	3	0
6	DF	(Cape Verde) CPV	Gegé	26	1	22+2	1	2	0
17	DF	(Saudi Arabia) KSA	Hani Al-Sebyani	13	0	10+2	0	1	0
23	DF	(Saudi Arabia) KSA	Awn Al-Saluli	2	1	0+1	0	1	1
24	DF	(Saudi Arabia) KSA	Ahmed Bamsaud	27	2	7+17	1	3	1
27	DF	(Saudi Arabia) KSA	Abdullah Kanno	6	0	2+3	0	1	0
33	DF	(Saudi Arabia) KSA	Mohammed Al-Baqawi	13	0	12+1	0	0	0
55	DF	(Saudi Arabia) KSA	Nawaf Al-Sobhi	15	3	14+1	3	0	0
Midfielders
8	MF	(Brazil) BRA	Ângelo Neto	30	1	26+1	1	3	0
10	MF	(Saudi Arabia) KSA	Abdullah Al-Mutairi	15	1	3+9	0	1+2	1
12	MF	(Saudi Arabia) KSA	Abdulkareem Al-Qahtani	21	2	10+10	2	0+1	0
14	MF	(Saudi Arabia) KSA	Mohanad Fallatah	9	0	5+2	0	2	0
16	MF	(Saudi Arabia) KSA	Abdulrahman Al-Barakah	30	0	24+3	0	3	0
18	MF	(Saudi Arabia) KSA	Hassan Jaafari	9	0	0+9	0	0	0
19	MF	(Ghana) GHA	Samuel Owusu	30	8	26+2	7	2	1
20	MF	(Chile) CHI	Carlos Villanueva	16	4	16	4	0	0
21	MF	(Saudi Arabia) KSA	Muhannad Awadh	1	0	0	0	0+1	0
77	MF	(Portugal) POR	Arsénio	31	2	27+1	1	2+1	1
Forwards
7	FW	(Chad) CHA	Othman Alhaj	15	1	1+12	1	1+1	0
9	FW	(Chile) CHI	Ronnie Fernández	17	9	15	7	2	2
11	FW	(Saudi Arabia) KSA	Hamad Al-Juhaim	15	1	2+12	1	0+1	0
28	FW	(Madagascar) MAD	Faneva Imà Andriatsima	13	1	13	1	0	0
Players sent out on loan this season
32	DF	(Saudi Arabia) KSA	Omar Al-Muziel	11	0	5+4	0	1+1	0
Player who made an appearance this season but have left the club
5	MF	(Brazil) BRA	Rafael Assis	9	0	8	0	0+1	0
99	GK	(Jordan) JOR	Amer Shafi	18	0	16	0	2	0

=== Goalscorers ===
Rank	No.	Pos	Nat	Name	Pro League	King Cup	Total
1	9	FW	(Chile)	Ronnie Fernández	7	2	9
2	19	MF	(Ghana)	Samuel Owusu	7	1	8
3	20	MF	(Chile)	Carlos Villanueva	4	0	4
4	55	DF	(Saudi Arabia)	Nawaf Al-Sobhi	3	0	3
5	4	DF	(Saudi Arabia)	Sami Al-Khaibari	2	0	2
5	12	MF	(Saudi Arabia)	Abdulkareem Al-Qahtani	2	0	2
5	24	DF	(Saudi Arabia)	Ahmed Bamsaud	1	1	2
5	77	MF	(Portugal)	Arsénio	1	1	2
9	2	DF	(Saudi Arabia)	Mukhair Al-Rashidi	1	0	1
9	6	DF	(Cape Verde)	Gegé	1	0	1
9	7	FW	(Chad)	Othman Alhaj	1	0	1
9	10	MF	(Saudi Arabia)	Abdullah Al-Mutairi	0	1	1
9	11	FW	(Saudi Arabia)	Hamad Al-Juhaim	1	0	1
9	16	MF	(Brazil)	Ângelo Neto	1	0	1
9	23	DF	(Saudi Arabia)	Awn Al-Saluli	0	1	1
9	28	FW	(Madagascar)	Faneva Imà Andriatsima	1	0	1
Own goal					1	1	2
Total					34	8	42

Last Updated: 4 September 2020

=== Clean sheets ===
Rank	No.	Pos	Nat	Name	Pro League	King Cup	Total
1	1	GK	(Saudi Arabia)	Moslem Al Freej	4	1	5
2	99	GK	(Jordan)	Amer Shafi	1	1	2
Total					5	2	7

Last Updated: 4 September 2020
