= 2020–21 Al-Raed FC season =

Al-Raed
2020–21 season
- Chairman: Fahad Al-Motawa'a
- Manager: Besnik Hasi
- Stadium: King Abdullah Sport City Stadium
- SPL: 10th
- King Cup: Round of 16 (knocked out by Al-Nassr)
- Top goalscorer: League: Karim El Berkaoui (15 goals); All: Karim El Berkaoui (15 goals)
- Highest home attendance: 947 (vs. Al-Fateh, 30 May 2021)
- All statistics correct as of 30 May 2021.

The 2020–21 season was Al-Raed's 67th year in their history and 13th consecutive season in the Pro League. The club participated in the Pro League and the King Cup.

The season covered the period from 22 September 2020 to 30 June 2021.

== Players ==
=== Squad information ===
As of 7 February 2021

Note: Flags indicate national team as defined under FIFA eligibility rules; some limited exceptions apply. Players may hold more than one non-FIFA nationality.

No.	Pos.	Nation	Player
2	DF	KSA	Fahad Al-Suyayfy
3	DF	KSA	Mohammed Krishan
4	DF	KSA	Khaled Al-Khathlan
6	MF	KSA	Abdullah Majrashi
7	MF	KSA	Mohammed Al-Sahli
8	MF	CMR	Arnaud Djoum
10	MF	MAR	Mohamed Fouzair
11	FW	MAR	Karim El Berkaoui
12	DF	KSA	Fawaz Fallatah
13	GK	KSA	Abdulbassit Hawsawi
14	FW	KSA	Abdullah Al-Mogren
15	MF	KSA	Jaber Issa
17	MF	GER	Marko Marin (on loan from Al-Ahli)
19	DF	KSA	Abdullah Al-Fahad
20	FW	KSA	Abdulfattah Adam (on loan from Al-Nassr)
21	DF	KSA	Ageel Balghaith

No.	Pos.	Nation	Player
23	GK	KSA	Ahmed Al-Rehaili
25	MF	KSA	Ali Bakri
27	MF	KSA	Awadh Khamis
29	MF	KSA	Mohammad Al-Subaie
30	GK	ALG	Azzedine Doukha
31	DF	KSA	Mansoor Al-Harbi
32	DF	KSA	Mohammed Al-Dossari
33	DF	KSA	Hussain Al-Showaish
40	MF	KSA	Mansor Al-Beshe (on loan from Al-Hilal)
44	MF	KSA	Sultan Al-Farhan
47	FW	KSA	Abdulrahman Al-Ghamdi
49	MF	KSA	Ahmed Al-Zain
50	GK	KSA	Mashari Sanyoor
73	DF	SRB	Nemanja Miletić
99	FW	CHI	Ronnie Fernández

==== Out on loan ====
Note: Flags indicate national team as defined under FIFA eligibility rules; some limited exceptions apply. Players may hold more than one non-FIFA nationality.

No.	Pos.	Nation	Player
9	FW	KSA	Raed Al-Ghamdi (at Al-Nassr until 30 June 2021)
16	MF	KSA	Bander Faleh (at Al-Shoulla until 30 June 2021)
40	DF	KSA	Muteb Al-Mutlaq (at Al-Sahel until 30 June 2021)

No.	Pos.	Nation	Player
70	MF	KSA	Hussain Al-Hajoj (at Najran until 30 June 2021)
77	FW	KSA	Rayan Al-Marshod (at Al-Bukiryah until 30 June 2021)
—	MF	KSA	Mohanad Al-Shudukhi (at Al-Bukiryah until 30 June 2021)

== Transfers and loans ==
=== Transfers in ===
Entry date	Position	No.	Player	From club	Fee	Ref.
9 September 2020	FW	11	(Saudi Arabia) Saleh Al-Shehri	(Saudi Arabia) Al-Hilal	End of loan	
22 September 2020	DF	4	(Saudi Arabia) Khaled Al-Khathlan	(Saudi Arabia) Abha	Free	
22 September 2020	DF	12	(Saudi Arabia) Fawaz Fallatah	(Saudi Arabia) Al-Qadsiah	Free	
22 September 2020	DF	21	(Saudi Arabia) Ageel Balghaith	(Saudi Arabia) Al-Faisaly	Free	
22 September 2020	DF	73	(Serbia) Nemanja Miletić	(Serbia) Partizan	$600,000	
22 September 2020	DF	98	(Saudi Arabia) Muhannad Al-Qaydhi	(Saudi Arabia) Al-Bukiryah	End of loan	
22 September 2020	MF	29	(Saudi Arabia) Mohammad Al-Subaie	(Saudi Arabia) Al-Ettifaq	Free	
3 October 2020	MF	27	(Saudi Arabia) Awadh Khamis	(Saudi Arabia) Al-Nassr	Free	
9 October 2020	DF	32	(Saudi Arabia) Mohammed Al-Dossari	(Saudi Arabia) Al-Hilal	Free	
9 October 2020	FW	47	(Saudi Arabia) Abdulrahman Al-Ghamdi	(Saudi Arabia) Al-Ittihad	Free	
18 October 2020	FW	11	(Morocco) Karim El Berkaoui	(Morocco) Hassania Agadir	$400,000	
25 October 2020	FW	9	(Serbia) Nemanja Nikolić	(Serbia) Partizan	$450,000	
6 January 2021	DF	31	(Saudi Arabia) Mansoor Al-Harbi	(Saudi Arabia) Al-Ittihad	Free	
29 January 2021	FW	99	(Chile) Ronnie Fernández	(Chile) Santiago Wanderers	Free	
3 February 2021	DF	2	(Saudi Arabia) Fahad Al-Suyayfy	(Saudi Arabia) Al-Bukiryah	End of loan	
4 February 2021	MF	15	(Saudi Arabia) Jaber Issa	(Saudi Arabia) Al-Wehda	Free	

=== Loans in ===
Start date	End date	Position	No.	Player	From club	Fee	Ref.
25 October 2020	End of season	FW	20	(Saudi Arabia) Abdulfattah Adam	(Saudi Arabia) Al-Nassr	None	
29 January 2021	End of season	MF	40	(Saudi Arabia) Mansor Al-Beshe	(Saudi Arabia) Al-Hilal	None	
7 February 2021	End of season	MF	17	(Germany) Marko Marin	(Saudi Arabia) Al-Ahli	None	

=== Transfers out ===
Exit date	Position	No.	Player	To club	Fee	Ref.
9 September 2020	FW	11	(Saudi Arabia) Saleh Al-Shehri	(Saudi Arabia) Al-Hilal	$2,666,000	
22 September 2020	DF	2	(Saudi Arabia) Mohammed Al-Amri	(Saudi Arabia) Al-Wehda	Free	
22 September 2020	DF	4	(Saudi Arabia) Faisal Darisi	(Saudi Arabia) Al-Ahli	End of loan	
22 September 2020	DF	32	(Saudi Arabia) Mohammed Al-Dossari	(Saudi Arabia) Al-Hilal	End of loan	
22 September 2020	DF	92	(Colombia) Ezequiel Palomeque	(Colombia) Unión Española	End of loan	
1 October 2020	DF	21	(Saudi Arabia) Mohammed Reeman	(Saudi Arabia) Ohod	Free	
1 October 2020	DF	98	(Saudi Arabia) Muhannad Al-Qaydhi	(Saudi Arabia) Abha	Free	
10 October 2020	DF	17	(Saudi Arabia) Mohammed Al-Shoraimi	(Saudi Arabia) Al-Ain	Free	
17 October 2020	GK	27	(Saudi Arabia) Khaled Al-Muqaitib	(Saudi Arabia) Al-Fayha	Free	
24 October 2020	MF	18	(Syria) Jehad Al-Hussain		Retired	
29 December 2020	FW	11	(Colombia) Marco Pérez	(Colombia) Deportivo Cali	Free	
1 February 2021	MF	5	(Morocco) Jalal Daoudi	(Morocco) AS FAR	Free	
28 March 2021	FW	9	(Serbia) Nemanja Nikolić	(Kazakhstan) FC Tobol	Free	

=== Loans out ===
Start date	End date	Position	No.	Player	To club	Fee	Ref.
20 October 2020	End of season	MF	15	(Saudi Arabia) Mohanad Al-Shudukhi	(Saudi Arabia) Al-Bukiryah	None	
20 October 2020	End of season	FW	77	(Saudi Arabia) Rayan Al-Marshoud	(Saudi Arabia) Al-Bukiryah	None	
21 October 2020	End of season	MF	70	(Saudi Arabia) Hussain Al-Hajoj	(Saudi Arabia) Najran	None	
23 October 2020	End of season	MF	16	(Saudi Arabia) Bander Faleh	(Saudi Arabia) Al-Shoulla	None	
25 October 2020	End of season	FW	9	(Saudi Arabia) Raed Al-Ghamdi	(Saudi Arabia) Al-Nassr	$267,000	
30 October 2020	End of season	DF	40	(Saudi Arabia) Muteb Al-Mutlaq	(Saudi Arabia) Al-Sahel	None	
1 November 2020	3 February 2021	DF	2	(Saudi Arabia) Fahad Al-Suyayfy	(Saudi Arabia) Al-Bukiryah	None	

== Competitions ==
=== Overview ===
Competition	Record							
Competition	G	W	D	L	GF	GA	GD	Win %
Pro League	30	10	6	14	44	47	−3	33.33
King Cup	1	0	0	1	0	2	−2	0.00
Total	31	10	6	15	44	49	−5	32.26

Updated to match played 30 May 2021
Source: Competitions

=== Pro League ===
==== League table ====
Pos	Team	Pld	W	D	L	GF	GA	GD	Pts	Qualification or relegation
8	Al-Ahli	30	11	6	13	44	56	−12	39	
9	Al-Faisaly	30	9	9	12	42	47	−5	36 (Note: Positions determined by head-to-head points: Al-Faisaly: 16 pts; Al-Raed: 15 pts; Damac: 13 pts; Al-Batin: 12 pts; Abha: 3 pts.)	Qualification for the Champions League group stage (Note: Al-Faisaly qualified for the Champions League group stage as 2020–21 King Cup winners.)
10	Al-Raed	30	10	6	14	44	47	−3	36	
11	Damac	30	9	9	12	43	48	−5	36	
12	Al-Batin	30	9	9	12	43	55	−12	36	

Source: spl.com source=إحصائيات رابطة دوري المحترفين السعودي 2020-2021
Rules for classification: 1) Points; 2) Head-to-head points; 3) Head-to-head goal difference; 4) Total goal difference; 5) Total goals scored; 6) Fair-play points (Note: Head-to-head record is used only after all the matches between the teams in question have been played).

==== Results summary ====
Overall								Home						Away					
Pld	W	D	L	GF	GA	GD	Pts	W	D	L	GF	GA	GD	W	D	L	GF	GA	GD
30	10	6	14	44	47	−3	36	3	4	8	23	26	−3	7	2	6	21	21	0

Last updated: 30 May 2021.
Source: spl.sa

==== Results by round ====
Round	1	2	3	4	5	6	7	8	9	10	11	12	13	14	15	16	17	18	19	20	21	22	23	24	25	26	27	28	29	30
Ground	A	H	A	A	H	A	H	H	A	H	H	A	H	H	A	H	A	H	H	A	H	A	A	H	A	A	H	A	A	H
Result	W	D	L	W	W	L	L	L	D	L	D	D	L	L	W	W	L	L	L	W	W	L	W	D	W	W	L	L	L	D
Position	1	3	9	5	4	5	8	12	11	12	12	13	14	14	14	11	12	14	14	14	12	13	10	12	10	7	10	10	10	10

Updated to match(es) played on 30 May 2021. Source: spl.com.sa
A = Away; H = Home; W = Win; D = Draw; L = Loss

==== Matches ====
All times are local, AST (UTC+3).

Win Draw Loss Postponed

18 October 2020 1	Damac	2–3	Al-Raed	Abha
18:20	Zelaya 45+3' (pen.), 84' (pen.); Lema (red card) 61'	Report	Al-Mogren 1'; Al-Sahli 22', 32'; Al-Fahad (yellow card) 26'; Balghaith (yellow card) 45+3'; Djoum (yellow card) 77'; Al-Rehaili (yellow card) 90+3'	Stadium: Prince Sultan bin Abdul Aziz Stadium; Attendance: 0 Referee: Shukri Al-Hanfoush

23 October 2020 2	Al-Raed	2–2	Al-Shabab	Buraidah
18:05	Daoudi 19' (pen.); Al-Hussain (yellow card) 86'; Khamis 89'	Report	Arlauskis (yellow card) 18'; Banega 38' (pen.); Martins (yellow card) 40'; Sharahili (yellow card) 45+5'; N'Diaye (yellow card) 57'; Guanca 62'; Al-Hamdan (yellow card) 70'	Stadium: King Abdullah Sport City Stadium; Attendance: 0 Referee: Sultan Al-Harbi

29 October 2020 3	Al-Batin	2–1	Al-Raed	Hafar al-Batin
17:50	Abreu 39'; Al-Shammeri 81'; Hyland (yellow card) 87'	Report	El Berkaoui 2'; Djoum (yellow card) 28' (yellow-red card) 48'; Daoudi (yellow card) 37'; Al-Farhan (yellow card) 61'; Nikolić (yellow card) 87'	Stadium: Al-Batin Club Stadium; Attendance: 0 Referee: Khaled Salwi

5 November 2020 4	Al-Wehda	2–3	Al-Raed	Mecca
19:45	Bakshween (yellow card) 27'; Niakaté 33'; Al-Zubaidi (yellow card) 36'; Hernâni 39'; Al-Jayzani (yellow card) 72'; Botía (yellow card) 90+3'	Report	Balghaith 2'; El Berkaoui 18'; Al-Mogren (yellow card) 37'; Al-Fahad (yellow card) 60'; Daoudi (yellow card) 71'; Al-Showaish (yellow card) 90'; Adam 90+4'	Stadium: King Abdul Aziz Stadium; Attendance: 0 Referee: Majed Al-Shamrani

23 November 2020 5	Al-Raed	2–1	Abha	Buraidah
15:15	Al-Zain 16'; Al-Farhan (yellow card) 41'; Djoum (yellow card) 61'; Fouzair 74'; Al-Rehaili (yellow card) 78'	Report	Strandberg 58'	Stadium: King Abdullah Sport City Stadium; Attendance: 0 Referee: Shukri Al-Hanfoush

28 November 2020 6	Al-Ain	1–0	Al-Raed	Al Bahah
15:35	Getterson (yellow card) 24', (goal) 90+1'; Al-Shoraimi (yellow card) 28'; Al-Qeshtah (yellow card) 29'; Al-Harbi (yellow card) 70'	Report	Djoum (yellow card) 55'; Fouzair (yellow card) 79' (yellow-red card) 81'	Stadium: King Saud Sport City Stadium; Attendance: 0 Referee: Khaled Salwi

7 December 2020 7	Al-Raed	0–1	Al-Hilal	Buraidah
17:50	Al-Zain (yellow card) 80'; Al-Sahli (yellow card) 90+5'	Report	Al-Bulaihi 84'; Kanno (yellow card) 86'	Stadium: King Abdullah Sport City Stadium; Attendance: 0 Referee: Faisal Al-Blwi

11 December 2020 8	Al-Raed	0–2	Al-Faisaly	Buraidah
17:50	Al-Fahad (yellow card) 71'; Al-Sahli (yellow card) 90'	Report	Al-Showaish 30' (o.g.); Tavares (yellow card) 61'; Guilherme 85'	Stadium: King Abdullah Sport City Stadium; Attendance: 0 Referee: Abdullah Al-Shehri

21 December 2020 9	Al-Ittihad	0–0	Al-Raed	Mecca
19:50	Al-Shamrani (yellow card) 30'	Report	Djoum (yellow card) 72'; Nikolić (yellow card) 85'	Stadium: King Abdul Aziz Stadium; Attendance: 0 Referee: Mohammed Al-Qarni

27 December 2020 10	Al-Raed	1–2	Al-Ahli	Buraidah
17:55	Nikolić 13' (pen.)	Report	Al Fatil (yellow card) 15'; Fettouhi (yellow card) 48'; Mitriță 55'; Al Somah 90+2'; Lima (yellow card) 90+6'	Stadium: King Abdullah Sport City Stadium; Attendance: 0 Referee: Sultan Al-Harbi

2 January 2021 11	Al-Raed	2–2	Al-Qadsiah	Buraidah
15:25	Nikolić 15', 41'; Miletić (yellow card) 50' (yellow-red card) 90+2'; Al-Mogren (yellow card) 65'; Al-Dossari (yellow card) 71'	Report	Asprilla 55'; Bordeianu (yellow card) 77'; Ohawuchi 90+1'	Stadium: King Abdullah Sport City Stadium; Attendance: 0 Referee: Majed Al-Shamrani

9 January 2021 12	Al-Taawoun	0–0	Al-Raed	Buraidah
15:30	Al-Nabit (yellow card) 31'; Santos (yellow card) 36'; Kadesh (yellow card) 45'; Amissi (yellow card) 59'; Abousaban (yellow card) 76'	Report	Fallatah (yellow card) 48' (yellow-red card) 53'	Stadium: King Abdullah Sport City Stadium; Attendance: 0 Referee: Khaled Al-Teris

15 January 2021 13	Al-Raed	0–1	Al-Nassr	Buraidah
18:10	Baalghyth (yellow card) 55'; Miletić (yellow card) 68'; Fouzair (yellow card) 72'; Daoudi (yellow card) 74'; Al-Zain (yellow card) 79'; Al-Khathlan (yellow card) 87'	Report	Al-Sulayhem 83'	Stadium: King Abdullah Sport City Stadium; Attendance: 0 Referee: Mohammed Al-Hoaish

19 January 2021 14	Al-Raed	2–3	Al-Ettifaq	Buraidah
15:40	Daoudi (yellow card) 32', (goal) 36'; Al-Mogren 63', (yellow card) 65'; Al-Dossari (yellow card) 82'	Report	Hazazi (yellow card) 61'; Kiss (yellow card) 66'; Souza 79'; Al-Hazaa 87', 89'	Stadium: King Abdullah Sport City Stadium; Attendance: 0 Referee: Shukri Al-Hanfoush

24 January 2021 15	Al-Fateh	0–2	Al-Raed	Al-Hasa
17:55	te Vrede (yellow card) 34'; Al-Daheem (yellow card) 53'; Al-Yousef (yellow card) 64'	Report	Djoum 22' (pen.); Al-Fahad (yellow card) 31'; El Berkaoui (yellow card) 45+3'; Al-Sahli 90+4', (yellow card) 90+6'	Stadium: Prince Abdullah bin Jalawi Stadium; Attendance: 0 Referee: Abdullah Al-Shehri

31 January 2021 16	Al-Raed	4–2	Damac	Buraidah
15:45	El Berkaoui 32', 58', 62', 90+3'; Baalghyth (yellow card) 45+4'; Fernández (yellow card) 79'; Al-Zain (yellow card) 90+4'	Report	Zelaya 1', (yellow card) 45+2'; Vittor (yellow card) 43' (yellow-red card) 45+2'; Lema (yellow card) 68'; Antolić 78' (pen.); Abdullah (yellow card) 90'	Stadium: King Abdullah Sport City Stadium; Attendance: 0 Referee: Mohammed Al-Smail

6 February 2021 17	Al-Shabab	4–1	Al-Raed	Riyadh
18:20	Banega 18' (pen.); Guanca 25', 73'; Sharahili (yellow card) 39'; Salem (yellow card) 45+1'; Martins 45+2'	Report	El Berkaoui 48'	Stadium: Prince Khalid bin Sultan Stadium; Attendance: 0 Referee: Shukri Al-Hanfoush

12 February 2021 18	Al-Raed	1–2	Al-Batin	Buraidah
18:30	Djoum (yellow card) 20'; Al-Zain 81'; Al-Fahad (yellow card) 90+4'; Issa (yellow card) 90+4'	Report	Baalghyth 47' (o.g.); Al-Mozairib 59', (yellow card) 75'; Al Khairi (yellow card) 89'; Al-Dhafiri (yellow card) 90+5'	Stadium: King Abdullah Sport City Stadium; Attendance: 0 Referee: Raed Al-Zahrani

17 February 2021 19	Al-Raed	1–3	Al-Wehda	Buraidah
15:55	Al-Harbi 16'; Al-Zain (yellow card) 85'	Report	Botía (yellow card) 4'; Anselmo (yellow card) 20', (goal) 44', 66'; Bakshween (yellow card) 84'; Al Hejji (yellow card) 89'; Hernâni 90+4'	Stadium: King Abdullah Sport City Stadium; Attendance: 0 Referee: Majed Al-Shamrani

22 February 2021 20	Abha	0–3	Al-Raed	Abha
16:10	Al-Amri (yellow card) 19'; Amr (yellow card) 45'	Report	Fouzair 12'; El Berkaoui 20' (pen.), 26'; Issa (yellow card) 66'	Stadium: Prince Sultan bin Abdul Aziz Stadium; Attendance: 0 Referee: Sultan Al-Harbi

28 February 2021 21	Al-Raed	4–0	Al-Ain	Buraidah
16:00	Al-Mogren 16', 53', 62'; Fernández 82'	Report	Ndiaye (yellow card) 42'; Bradarić (yellow card) 45+1'; Fouad (yellow card) 76'	Stadium: King Abdullah Sport City Stadium; Attendance: 0 Referee: Abdullah Al-Shehri

5 March 2021 22	Al-Hilal	2–1	Al-Raed	Riyadh
20:35	Al-Bulaihi (yellow card) 13' (yellow-red card) 64'; Al-Shahrani 56'; Jang Hyun-soo (yellow card) 67'; Doukha 90+3' (o.g.)	Report	Al-Dossari (yellow card) 42'; El Berkaoui 69' (pen.)	Stadium: Prince Faisal bin Fahd Stadium; Attendance: 0 Referee: Ovidiu Hațegan (Romania)

10 March 2021 23	Al-Faisaly	0–1	Al-Raed	Al Majma'ah
20:15	Majrashi (yellow card) 28'; Merkel (yellow card) 86'	Report	Fernández 71'; Marin (yellow card) 74'; Al-Sahli (yellow card) 90+2'	Stadium: Al Majma'ah Sports City; Attendance: 0 Referee: Mohammed Al-Hoaish

20 March 2021 24	Al-Raed	1–1	Al-Ittihad	Buraidah
16:15	Fouzair (yellow card) 16' (yellow-red card) 86'; Al-Showaish (yellow card) 16'; Al-Farhan (yellow card) 24'; El Berkaoui 69'	Report	El Ahmadi (yellow card) 19'; Hegazi (red card) 37'; Romarinho 64'; Al-Sahafi (yellow card) 89'	Stadium: King Abdullah Sport City Stadium; Attendance: 0 Referee: Khaled Al-Teris

8 April 2021 25	Al-Ahli	2–3	Al-Raed	Mecca
20:50	Ghareeb (yellow card) 22'; Hassoun (yellow card) 58'; Assiri 72'; Al Somah 90+1' (pen.)	Report	Djoum (yellow card) 4', (goal) 28'; Doukha (yellow card) 10'; El Berkaoui 16' (pen.), 24' (pen.); Al-Khathlan (yellow card) 81'; Al-Fahad (yellow card) 90'; Al-Dossari (yellow card) 90+6'	Stadium: King Abdul Aziz Stadium; Attendance: 0 Referee: Shukri Al-Hanfoush

16 April 2021 26	Al-Qadsiah	0–1	Al-Raed	Khobar
21:35	Al-Nattar (yellow card) 30'; Asprilla (yellow card) 56' (yellow-red card) 67'; Al-Amri (yellow card) 64'	Report	Al-Farhan (yellow card) 38'; El Berkaoui 90+6', (yellow card) 90+7'	Stadium: Prince Saud bin Jalawi Stadium; Attendance: 0 Referee: Majed Al-Shamrani

15 May 2021 27	Al-Raed	1–2	Al-Taawoun	Buraidah
19:20	Majrashi (yellow card) 11'; Al-Mogren 82'; Al-Fahad (yellow card) 90+1'	Report	Al-Jouei (yellow card) 22'; Al-Nabit 45+1'; Kaku 47'; Kadesh (yellow card) 73'	Stadium: King Abdullah Sport City Stadium; Attendance: 0 Referee: Mohammed Al-Hoaish

20 May 2021 28	Al-Nassr	3–1	Al-Raed	Riyadh
21:00	Al-Buraikan 59'; Abdullah (yellow card) 65'; Hamdallah 75', 88'; S. Al-Ghanam (yellow card) 84'	Report	Djoum (yellow card) 13', (goal) 29'; El Berkaoui (yellow card) 45+2'; Issa (yellow card) 73'	Stadium: Mrsool Park; Attendance: 7,525; Referee: Majed Al-Shamrani

25 May 2021 29	Al-Ettifaq	3–1	Al-Raed	Dammam
21:00	Hawsawi (yellow card) 5'; Al-Robeai 14'; Sliti 18'; Azaro 50', (yellow card) 68' (yellow-red card) 68'	Report	Issa (yellow card) 16'; Djoum (yellow card) 35'; Fernández 88'	Stadium: Prince Mohamed bin Fahd Stadium; Attendance: 866; Referee: Shukri Al-Hanfoush

30 May 2021 30	Al-Raed	2–2	Al-Fateh	Buraidah
21:00	El Berkaoui 45+1' (pen.); Al-Showaish 45+4'; Fernández (yellow card) 63'; Al-Khathlan (yellow card) 90+7'	Report	Soudani 40'; Saâdane (yellow card) 71'; Cueva 74'; Buhimed (yellow card) 88'; Majrashi (yellow card) 90'; Batna (yellow card) 90'; Boushal (yellow card) 90'	Stadium: King Abdullah Sport City Stadium; Attendance: 947; Referee: Abdullah Al-Shehri

=== King Cup ===
All times are local, AST (UTC+3).

16 December 2020 Round of 16	Al-Nassr	2–0	Al-Raed	Riyadh
20:20	Yahya 21', (yellow card) 30'; Martínez (yellow card) 27'; Al-Najei 67'; Al-Ghannam (yellow card) 71'; Maicon (yellow card) 76'; Petros (yellow card) 79'	Report	Daoudi (yellow card) 77'	Stadium: King Fahd International Stadium; Attendance: 0 Referee: Raed Al-Zahrani

== Statistics ==
=== Appearances ===
Last updated on 30 May 2021.

No.	Pos	Nat	Player	Total		Pro League		King Cup	
No.	Pos	Nat	Player	Apps	Goals	Apps	Goals	Apps	Goals
Goalkeepers
13	GK	(Nigeria) NGR	Abdulbassit Hawsawi	0	0	0	0	0	0
23	GK	(Saudi Arabia) KSA	Ahmed Al-Rehaili	6	0	5	0	1	0
30	GK	(Algeria) ALG	Azzedine Doukha	25	0	25	0	0	0
50	GK	(Saudi Arabia) KSA	Meshari Sanyoor	0	0	0	0	0	0
Defenders
2	DF	(Saudi Arabia) KSA	Fahad Al-Suyayfy	0	0	0	0	0	0
3	DF	(Saudi Arabia) KSA	Mohammed Krishan	0	0	0	0	0	0
4	DF	(Saudi Arabia) KSA	Khaled Al-Khathlan	21	0	17+3	0	1	0
12	DF	(Saudi Arabia) KSA	Fawaz Fallatah	3	0	1+2	0	0	0
19	DF	(Saudi Arabia) KSA	Abdullah Al-Fahad	29	0	28	0	1	0
21	DF	(Saudi Arabia) KSA	Ageel Balghaith	18	1	12+6	1	0	0
31	DF	(Saudi Arabia) KSA	Mansoor Al-Harbi	7	1	1+6	1	0	0
32	DF	(Saudi Arabia) KSA	Mohammed Al-Dossari	27	0	12+14	0	1	0
33	DF	(Saudi Arabia) KSA	Hussain Al-Showaish	24	1	19+5	1	0	0
73	DF	(Serbia) SRB	Nemanja Miletić	30	0	29	0	1	0
Midfielders
6	MF	(Saudi Arabia) KSA	Abdullah Majrashi	12	0	4+8	0	0	0
7	MF	(Saudi Arabia) KSA	Mohammed Al-Sahli	24	3	8+15	3	0+1	0
8	MF	(Cameroon) CMR	Arnaud Djoum	26	3	25	3	1	0
10	MF	(Morocco) MAR	Mohamed Fouzair	17	2	12+4	2	1	0
15	MF	(Saudi Arabia) KSA	Jaber Issa	9	0	2+7	0	0	0
17	MF	(Germany) GER	Marko Marin	10	0	10	0	0	0
25	MF	(Saudi Arabia) KSA	Ali Bakri	0	0	0	0	0	0
27	MF	(Saudi Arabia) KSA	Awadh Khamis	4	1	2+2	1	0	0
29	MF	(Saudi Arabia) KSA	Mohammad Al-Subaie	1	0	0+1	0	0	0
40	MF	(Saudi Arabia) KSA	Mansor Al-Beshe	1	0	0+1	0	0	0
44	MF	(Saudi Arabia) KSA	Sultan Al-Farhan	29	1	28	1	1	0
49	MF	(Saudi Arabia) KSA	Ahmed Al-Zain	28	2	22+5	2	1	0
Forwards
11	FW	(Morocco) MAR	Karim El Berkaoui	26	15	20+5	15	1	0
14	FW	(Saudi Arabia) KSA	Abdullah Al-Mogren	31	5	22+8	5	0+1	0
20	FW	(Saudi Arabia) KSA	Abdulfattah Adam	3	1	0+3	1	0	0
47	FW	(Saudi Arabia) KSA	Abdulrahman Al-Ghamdi	2	0	0+2	0	0	0
99	FW	(Chile) CHI	Ronnie Fernández	15	3	5+10	3	0	0
Player who made an appearance this season but have left the club
5	MF	(Morocco) MAR	Jalal Daoudi	13	2	10+2	2	1	0
9	FW	(Serbia) SRB	Nemanja Nikolić	15	3	11+3	3	0+1	0
18	MF	(Syria) SYR	Jehad Al-Hussain	2	0	0+2	0	0	0

=== Goalscorers ===
Rank	No.	Pos	Nat	Name	Pro League	King Cup	Total
1	11	FW	(Morocco)	Karim El Berkaoui	15	0	15
2	14	FW	(Saudi Arabia)	Abdullah Al-Mogren	5	0	5
3	7	MF	(Saudi Arabia)	Mohammed Al-Sahli	3	0	3
3	8	MF	(Colombia)	Arnaud Djoum	3	0	3
3	9	FW	(Serbia)	Nemanja Nikolić	3	0	3
3	99	FW	(Chile)	Ronnie Fernández	3	0	3
7	5	MF	(Morocco)	Jalal Daoudi	2	0	2
7	10	MF	(Morocco)	Mohamed Fouzair	2	0	2
7	49	MF	(Saudi Arabia)	Ahmed Al-Zain	2	0	2
10	20	FW	(Saudi Arabia)	Abdulfattah Adam	1	0	1
10	21	DF	(Saudi Arabia)	Ageel Balghaith	1	0	1
10	27	MF	(Saudi Arabia)	Awadh Khamis	1	0	1
10	31	DF	(Saudi Arabia)	Mansoor Al-Harbi	1	0	1
10	33	DF	(Saudi Arabia)	Hussain Al-Showaish	1	0	1
10	44	MF	(Saudi Arabia)	Sultan Al-Farhan	1	0	1
Own goal					0	0	0
Total					44	0	44

Last Updated: 30 May 2021

=== Assists ===
Rank	No.	Pos	Nat	Name	Pro League	King Cup	Total
1	14	FW	(Saudi Arabia)	Abdullah Al-Mogren	5	0	5
2	7	MF	(Saudi Arabia)	Mohammed Al-Sahli	4	0	4
3	8	MF	(Colombia)	Arnaud Djoum	3	0	3
3	17	MF	(Germany)	Marko Marin	3	0	3
3	19	DF	(Saudi Arabia)	Abdullah Al-Fahad	3	0	3
3	49	MF	(Saudi Arabia)	Ahmed Al-Zain	3	0	3
7	99	FW	(Chile)	Ronnie Fernández	2	0	2
8	5	MF	(Morocco)	Jalal Daoudi	1	0	1
8	10	MF	(Morocco)	Mohamed Fouzair	1	0	1
8	27	MF	(Saudi Arabia)	Awadh Khamis	1	0	1
8	32	DF	(Saudi Arabia)	Mohammed Al-Dossari	1	0	1
8	73	DF	(Serbia)	Nemanja Miletić	1	0	1
Total					28	0	28

Last Updated: 30 May 2021

=== Clean sheets ===
Rank	No.	Pos	Nat	Name	Pro League	King Cup	Total
1	30	GK	(Algeria)	Azzedine Doukha	7	0	7
Total					7	0	7

Last Updated: 30 May 2021
