= Mansour Nammazi =

Saudi Arabian footballer

Personal information
- Full name: Mansour Seddiq Nammazi
- Date of birth: March 13, 1993 (age 33)
- Place of birth: Saudi Arabia
- Position: Defender

Youth career
- ???–2015: Al-Ittihad

Senior career*
Years	Team	Apps	(Gls)
2015–2016	Al-Ittihad	0	(0)
2015	→ Hajer (loan)	7	(0)
2016	→ Al-Fayha (loan)		
2016–2017	Al-Qous		

International career
- Saudi Arabia U20
- * Club domestic league appearances and goals

Mansour Seddiq Nammazi (Arabic: منصور صديق نمازي; born March 13, 1993) is a Saudi football player who plays a defender .
