= Omar Al-Muziel =

Saudi Arabian footballer

Personal information
- Full name: Omar Mohammed Al-Muziel
- Date of birth: July 25, 1992 (age 34)
- Place of birth: Thadig, Saudi Arabia
- Height: 1.74 m (5 ft 9 in)
- Position: Right-back

Youth career
- Al-Mehmal

Senior career*
Years	Team	Apps	(Gls)
2014–2016	Al-Shabab	0	(0)
2015	→ Al-Orobah (loan)	1	(0)
2015–2016	→ Al-Wehda (loan)	5	(0)
2016–2019	Al-Ittihad	39	(0)
2019	→ Al-Fayha (loan)	7	(1)
2019–2020	Al-Fayha	9	(0)
2020	→ Abha (loan)	4	(0)
2020–2023	Damac	0	(0)
2022–2023	→ Al-Shoulla (loan)	19	(0)
2023–2024	Hajer	17	(1)
2024–2025	Al-Shoulla		
- * Club domestic league appearances and goals as of 31 May 2023

Omar Al-Muziel (Arabic: عمر المزيعل; born 25 July 1992) is a Saudi Arabian professional footballer who currently plays as a right-back.

== Career ==
Al-Muziel started his career at Al-Mehmal in his hometown of Thadig. He joined Al-Shabab when he was 16 years old. He was promoted to the first during the 2014–15 season, however, he failed to make an appearance for Al-Shabab. On 8 February 2015, Al-Muziel joined Al-Orobah on a 5-month loan. He made 3 appearances for Al-Orobah in all competitions before returning to Al-Shabab at the end of the season. On 24 August 2015, Al-Muziel joined Al-Wehda on a season-long loan. On 5 August 2016, Al-Muziel was released from his contract by Al-Shabab.

On 9 August 2016, Al-Muziel joined Al-Ittihad on a three-year contract. In his first season at the club he made 23 appearances in all competitions and started in the Crown Prince Cup final against Al-Nassr which ended in a 1–0 win. On 12 May 2018, Al-Muziel started the King Cup final win against Al-Faisaly. On 23 January 2019, Al-Muziel joined Al-Fayha on loan until the end of the season. He scored his first goal for the club on 16 May 2019 in the 5–2 win against Al-Wehda.

Following the expiry of his contract with Al-Ittihad, Al-Muziel signed a three-year contract with Al-Fayha on 30 May 2019. On 28 January 2020, he was loaned out to fellow Pro League side Abha.

On 6 October 2020, Al-Muziel joined Damac. On 9 September 2022, Al-Muziel joined Al-Shoulla on loan.

On 13 July 2023, Al-Muziel joined Hajer after being released by Damac. On 10 September 2024, Al-Muziel joined Al-Shoulla.

== Career statistics ==
=== Club ===
As of match played 9 September 2020

Club	Season	League			King Cup		Asia		Other		Total	
Club	Season	Division	Apps	Goals	Apps	Goals	Apps	Goals	Apps	Goals	Apps	Goals
Al-Orobah (loan)	2014–15	Pro League	1	0	2	0	—		—		3	0
Al-Wehda (loan)	2015–16	Pro League	5	0	1	0	—		—		6	0
Al-Ittihad	2016–17	Pro League	19	0	1	0	—		3 (Note: Appearances in Crown Prince Cup)	0	23	0
Al-Ittihad	2017–18	Pro League	12	0	4	0	—		—		16	0
Al-Ittihad	2018–19	Pro League	8	0	0	0	0	0	—		8	0
Al-Ittihad	Total		39	0	5	0	0	0	3	0	47	0
Al-Fayha (loan)	2018–19	Pro League	7	1	0	0	—		—		7	1
Al-Fayha	2019–20	Pro League	9	0	2	0	—		—		11	0
Abha (loan)	2019–20	Pro League	4	0	0	0	—		—		4	0
Career totals			65	1	10	0	0	0	3	0	78	1

== Honours ==
Al-Ittihad

- King Cup: 2018
- Crown Prince Cup: 2016–17
