= Yago (footballer, born 1995) =

Brazilian footballer

Personal information
- Full name: Yago Henrique Severino dos Santos
- Date of birth: 7 July 1995 (age 31)
- Place of birth: Belo Horizonte, Brazil
- Height: 1.80 m (5 ft 11 in)
- Position: Defensive midfielder

Team information
- Current team: CSA

Youth career
- 2013–2015: Atlético Mineiro

Senior career*
Years	Team	Apps	(Gls)
2013–2021	Atlético Mineiro	42	(1)
2018–2019	→ Al-Qadsiah (loan)	13	(0)
2019	→ Sport Recife (loan)	13	(1)
2020–2021	→ CSA (loan)	40	(4)
2021	Juventude	5	(0)
2021	→ Ponte Preta (loan)	13	(0)
2022	CRB	41	(1)
2023	Guarani	5	(0)
2023–	CSA	4	(0)
- * Club domestic league appearances and goals as of 02:08, 30 November 2021 (UTC)

Yago Henrique Severino dos Santos (born 7 July 1995), simply known as Yago, is a Brazilian professional footballer who plays as a defensive midfielder for CSA.

== Honours ==
Atlético Mineiro

- Campeonato Mineiro: 2017
