= Rafael Assis (footballer, born 1990) =

Brazilian footballer

Personal information
- Full name: Rafael Henrique Assis Cardoso
- Date of birth: 31 October 1990 (age 36)
- Place of birth: Belo Horizonte, Brazil
- Height: 1.70 m (5 ft 7 in)
- Position: Defensive midfielder

Youth career
- 2008: Cruzeiro

Senior career*
Years	Team	Apps	(Gls)
2008	Cruzeiro	0	(0)
2008	→ Ipatinga (loan)		
2009	Bahia		
2009–2010	Leme		
2010	→ Duque de Caxias (loan)		
2011	Figueirense		
2012	Tigres do Brasil		
2013	Olaria	15	(0)
2014	Santa Rita	18	(0)
2014–2015	Beira-Mar	41	(1)
2015–2017	Chaves	51	(0)
2017–2021	Braga	7	(0)
2018–2021	Braga B	11	(0)
2018–2019	→ Paços Ferreira (loan)	14	(0)
2019–2020	→ Al-Fayha (loan)	8	(0)
2020	→ Londrina (loan)	3	(0)
2021–2022	Varzim	3	(0)
2022–2023	Al-Khaldiya	14	(0)
2023	Al-Najma	12	(0)
2023–2026	Trofense	49	(0)
- * Club domestic league appearances and goals as of 7 May 2026

Rafael Henrique Assis Cardoso, known as Rafael Assis (born 31 October 1990) is a Brazilian professional footballer who plays as a defensive midfielder.

== Club career ==
He made his professional debut in the Campeonato Carioca for Olaria on 19 January 2013 in a game against Audax Rio.

He made his Primeira Liga debut for Chaves on 4 September 2016, when he played the whole game in a 1–0 victory against Nacional.
