= Mansour Al-Najjar =

Saudi Arabian footballer

Personal information
- Full name: Mansour Adel Mohammed Al-Najjar
- Date of birth: December 22, 1994 (age 31)
- Place of birth: Mecca, Saudi Arabia
- Position: Midfielder

Youth career
- Al-Wehda

Senior career*
Years	Team	Apps	(Gls)
2015–2017	Al-Wehda	23	(0)
2017–2022	Al-Qadsiah	44	(0)
2022	Al-Kholood	5	(0)
2022–2023	Jeddah		
- * Club domestic league appearances and goals as of 22 January 2022

Mansour Al-Najjar (Arabic: منصور النجار; born 22 December 1994) is a Saudi football player who currently plays as a midfielder.
