= Fawaz Fallatah =

Saudi Arabian footballer

Personal information
- Full name: Fawaz Mohammed Fallatah
- Date of birth: March 8, 1989 (age 37)
- Place of birth: Saudi Arabia
- Height: 1.76 m (5 ft 9 1/2 in)
- Position: Defender

Youth career
- Ohod

Senior career*
Years	Team	Apps	(Gls)
2009–2012	Ohod	?	(?)
2012–2013	Al-Hiall	0	(0)
2012–2013	→ Al-Raed (loan)	16	(0)
2013–2015	Al Orobah	44	(2)
2015–2017	Al Faisaly	46	(0)
2017–2020	Al-Qadsiah	25	(0)
2020–2021	Al-Raed	3	(0)
2021–2023	Al Orobah	50	(1)
- * Club domestic league appearances and goals as of 31 May 2021

Fawaz Fallatah (Arabic: فواز فلاته; born 8 March 1989) is a Saudi Arabian footballer who currently plays as a defender.
