= Sami Al-Najei =

Saudi football player (born 1997)

Personal information
- Full name: Sami Khalil Nasser Al-Najei
- Date of birth: 7 February 1997 (age 29)
- Place of birth: Jizan, Saudi Arabia
- Height: 1.76 m (5 ft 9 in)
- Position: Midfielder

Team information
- Current team: Al-Nassr
- Number: 14

Youth career
- Al-Nassr

Senior career*
Years	Team	Apps	(Gls)
2016–	Al-Nassr	122	(13)
2019	→ Al-Qadsiah (loan)	4	(0)
2019–2020	→ Damac (loan)	17	(0)

International career
2016–2017	Saudi Arabia U20	6	(4)
2018–2021	Saudi Arabia U23	2	(2)
2017–2024	Saudi Arabia	22	(2)
- * Club domestic league appearances and goals as of 29 October 2026

Sami Khalil Nasser Al-Najei (Arabic: سامي خليل ناصر النجعي; born 7 February 1997) is a Saudi Arabian professional footballer who plays as a midfielder for Saudi Pro League club Al-Nassr.

== Club career ==
=== Al-Nassr ===
==== 2015/2016 ====
In 2016, Al-Nassr brought Al-Najei to the first team. On 8 May 2016, Al-Najei made his debut as a substitute in the 74' minute against Ittihad and scored his first goal. Five days later, he played his second match against Al-Shabab.

==== 2016/2017 ====
On 20 October 2016, Al-Najei played his first match of the season against Ittihad replacing Yahya Al-Shehri in the 58' minute, but he got a yellow card in the match. On 21 December 2016, Al-Najei scored his first goal of the season against Al-Fateh in 53rd minute. On 1 January 2017, he played his first match in the starting 11 against Ettifaq FC. On 14 March 2017, he got a second yellow card against Al-Raed.

== International career ==
On 14 January 2017, Al-Najei made his debut against Cambodia in the 76th minute in a friendly, the match was ended 7-2 for the Saudis.

=== International goals ===
As of 12 October 2021.

Scores and results list Saudi Arabia's goal tally first.

No.	Date	Venue	Opponent	Score	Result	Competition
1.	12 October 2021	King Abdullah Sports City Stadium, Jeddah, Saudi Arabia	China	1–0	3–2	2022 FIFA World Cup qualification
2.	12 October 2021	King Abdullah Sports City Stadium, Jeddah, Saudi Arabia	China	2–0	3–2	2022 FIFA World Cup qualification

== Career statistics ==
=== Club ===
As of 31 May 2024

Club	Season	Pro League		King Cup		Asia		Other		Total	
Club	Season	Apps	Goals	Apps	Goals	Apps	Goals	Apps	Goals	Apps	Goals
Al-Nassr	2015–16	2	1	0	0	0	0	—		2	1
Al-Nassr	2016–17	9	1	1	1	—		2 (Note: Appearances in Crown Prince Cup)	0	12	2
Al-Nassr	2017–18	9	0	0	0	—		1 (Note: Appearance in Arab Club Championship)	0	10	0
Al-Nassr	2020–21	26	6	3	2	7	0	1 (Note: Appearance in Saudi Super Cup)	1	37	9
Al-Nassr	2021–22	21	2	1	0	3	1	—		25	3
Al-Nassr	2022–23	24	2	2	2	—		1	0	27	4
Al-Nassr	2023–24	20	1	2	1	8	0	0	0	30	2
Al-Nassr	Total	111	13	9	6	18	1	5	1	143	21
Al-Qadsiah (loan)	2018–19	4	0	0	0	—		—		4	0
Damac (loan)	2019–20	17	0	1	1	—		—		18	1
Career total		132	13	10	7	18	1	5	1	165	22

=== International ===
Saudi Arabia
Year	Apps	Goals
2017	1	0
2021	8	2
2022	9	0
2024	4	0
Total	22	2

== Honours ==
=== Club ===
Al-Nassr

- Saudi Super Cup: 2020, runners-up : 2024,
- Arab Club Champions Cup: 2023

=== Individual ===
- Saudi Pro League Young Player of the Month: April & May 2021
