= 2020–21 Al-Qadsiah FC season =

Al-Qadsiah
2020–21 season
- President: Musaad Al-Zamil (until 12 April); Ahmed Ghodran (from 12 April)
- Manager: Yousef Al Mannai
- Stadium: Prince Saud bin Jalawi Stadium
- SPL: 14th (relegated)
- King Cup: Quarter-finals (knocked out by Al-Taawoun)
- Top goalscorer: League: Hassan Al-Amri (12); All: Hassan Al-Amri (14)
- Highest home attendance: 1,273 (vs. Abha, 30 May 2021)
Home colours	Away colours	Third colours
- All statistics correct as of 30 May 2021.

The 2020–21 season was Al-Qadsiah's first season back in the Pro League following their promotion last year and their 54th year in their existence. Along with competing in the Pro League, the club also participated in the King Cup.

The season covers the period from 22 September 2020 to 30 June 2021.

== Players ==
=== Squad information ===
As of 1 February 2021

Note: Flags indicate national team as defined under FIFA eligibility rules; some limited exceptions apply. Players may hold more than one non-FIFA nationality.

No.	Pos.	Nation	Player
2	FW	MAD	Carolus Andria
3	DF	KSA	Adel Al-Muwallad
4	DF	AUS	Rhys Williams
5	MF	BRA	Edson
7	MF	KSA	Hassan Al-Amri
8	MF	KSA	Abdulrahman Al-Safri
10	FW	NGA	Stanley Ohawuchi
12	DF	KSA	Anas Zabani
14	MF	KSA	Mansour Al-Najjar
15	MF	KSA	Ahmed Al-Fraidi
16	MF	KSA	Nawaf Al-Azizi
17	DF	KSA	Faris Abdi
18	MF	KSA	Naif Hazazi (captain)
19	MF	KSA	Abdulmohsen Al-Qahtani
20	DF	SRB	Uroš Vitas
23	DF	KSA	Ibrahim Al-Shoeil

No.	Pos.	Nation	Player
24	MF	KSA	Hassan Abo Shararah
25	DF	KSA	Khalifah Al-Dawsari
27	DF	KSA	Talal Hawsawi
30	GK	KSA	Mohammed Al-Waked (on loan from Al-Hilal)
31	FW	KSA	Waleed Al-Shanqeeti
37	GK	KSA	Abdulaziz Al-Shehri
49	FW	KSA	Eissa Al Thakrallah
50	DF	KSA	Jehad Thakri
55	GK	KSA	Faisel Masrahi
66	MF	KSA	Saleh Aboulshamat
70	MF	COL	Danilo Asprilla
77	MF	KSA	Omar Al-Zayni
88	DF	KSA	Hamad Al-Yami
90	FW	NGA	Leke James
96	MF	KSA	Hussain Al-Nattar
97	GK	KSA	Emad Fida

=== Out on loan ===
Note: Flags indicate national team as defined under FIFA eligibility rules; some limited exceptions apply. Players may hold more than one non-FIFA nationality.

No.	Pos.	Nation	Player
6	DF	ROU	Mihai Bordeianu (at CFR Cluj until 30 June 2021)
13	DF	KSA	Omar Al-Najem (at Al-Bukiryah until 30 June 2021)
21	FW	KSA	Abdullah Hadhereti (at Al-Jabalain until 30 June 2021)
22	GK	KSA	Omar Al-Dasmal (at Bisha until 30 June 2021)

No.	Pos.	Nation	Player
—	DF	KSA	Salem Al-Hamdan (at Al-Nojoom until 30 June 2021)
—	FW	KSA	Wael Faqihi (at Al-Sahel until 30 June 2021)
—	FW	CHA	Mohammed Fuesrai (at Bisha until 30 June 2021)

== Transfers and loans ==
=== Transfers in ===
Entry date	Position	No.	Player	From club	Fee	Ref.
22 September 2020	GK	40	(Saudi Arabia) Ahmed Al-Fahmi	(Saudi Arabia) Al-Kawkab	End of loan	
22 September 2020	DF	12	(Saudi Arabia) Salem Al-Hamdan	(Saudi Arabia) Al-Bukiryah	End of loan	
22 September 2020	DF	27	(Saudi Arabia) Nasser Al-Khalifah	(Saudi Arabia) Al-Taqadom	End of loan	
22 September 2020	DF	–	(Saudi Arabia) Abdullah Al-Bishi	(Saudi Arabia) Al-Taqadom	End of loan	
22 September 2020	MF	16	(Saudi Arabia) Nawaf Al-Azizi	(Saudi Arabia) Al-Taqadom	End of loan	
22 September 2020	FW	3	(Saudi Arabia) Wael Faqihi	(Saudi Arabia) Al-Taqadom	End of loan	
2 October 2020	MF	70	(Colombia) Danilo Asprilla	(Saudi Arabia) Al-Shabab	Free	
2 October 2020	FW	2	(Madagascar) Carolus Andria	(Saudi Arabia) Al-Adalah	Free	
11 October 2020	MF	5	(Brazil) Edson	(Brazil) Atlético Goianiense	$300,000	
14 October 2020	MF	6	(Romania) Mihai Bordeianu	(Romania) CFR Cluj	$1,300,000	
23 October 2020	DF	20	(Serbia) Uroš Vitas	(Serbia) Partizan	$600,000	
25 October 2020	MF	15	(Saudi Arabia) Ahmed Al-Fraidi	(Spain) Melilla	Free	
26 October 2020	DF	17	(Saudi Arabia) Faris Abdi	(Saudi Arabia) Al-Wehda	Undisclosed	
26 October 2020	DF	27	(Saudi Arabia) Talal Hawsawi	(Saudi Arabia) Najran	Free	
26 October 2020	MF	77	(Saudi Arabia) Omar Al-Zayni	(Saudi Arabia) Al-Qadsiah	Free	
26 October 2020	FW	21	(Saudi Arabia) Abdullah Hadhereti	(Saudi Arabia) Al-Taqadom	Free	
27 January 2021	FW	90	(Nigeria) Leke James	(Norway) Molde	Free	

=== Loans in ===
Start date	End date	Position	No.	Player	From club	Fee	Ref.
19 October 2020	End of season	GK	30	(Saudi Arabia) Mohammed Al-Waked	(Saudi Arabia) Al-Hilal	None	

=== Transfers out ===
Exit date	Position	No.	Player	To club	Fee	Ref.
22 September 2020	DF	15	(Saudi Arabia) Fawaz Fallatah	(Saudi Arabia) Al-Raed	Free	
22 September 2020	MF	8	(Saudi Arabia) Bader Bashir	(Saudi Arabia) Al-Faisaly	End of loan	
22 September 2020	MF	28	(Saudi Arabia) Nawaf Al-Habashi	(Saudi Arabia) Al-Shabab	End of loan	
22 September 2020	MF	77	(Saudi Arabia) Omar Al-Zayni	(Saudi Arabia) Al-Ahli	End of loan	
22 September 2020	MF	91	(Saudi Arabia) Faraj Al-Ghashayan	(Saudi Arabia) Al-Nassr	End of loan	
22 September 2020	FW	20	(Bahrain) Mahdi Al-Humaidan	(Bahrain) Al-Ahli Manama	End of loan	
22 September 2020	FW	21	(Saudi Arabia) Abdullah Hadhereti	(Saudi Arabia) Al-Taqadom	End of loan	
26 September 2020	DF	27	(Saudi Arabia) Nasser Al-Khalifah	(Saudi Arabia) Hajer	Free	
1 October 2020	GK	40	(Saudi Arabia) Ahmed Al-Fahmi	(Saudi Arabia) Al-Kawkab	Free	
1 October 2020	DF	–	(Saudi Arabia) Abdullah Al-Bishi	(Saudi Arabia) Al-Kawkab	Free	
2 October 2020	MF	70	(Saudi Arabia) Nasser Al-Abdeli	(Saudi Arabia) Al-Khaleej	Free	
11 October 2020	MF	17	(Saudi Arabia) Hussain Al-Sheikh	(Saudi Arabia) Al-Sahel	Free	
11 October 2020	FW	29	(Saudi Arabia) Fahad Al-Munaif	(Saudi Arabia) Ohod	Free	
21 October 2020	DF	6	(Saudi Arabia) Majed Al-Khaibari	(Saudi Arabia) Al-Shoulla	Free	
21 December 2020	GK	1	(Australia) Jack Duncan	(Australia) Newcastle Jets	Free	

=== Loans out ===
Start date	End date	Position	No.	Player	To club	Fee	Ref.
26 October 2020	End of season	FW	3	(Saudi Arabia) Wael Faqihi	(Saudi Arabia) Al-Sahel	None	
29 October 2020	End of season	GK	22	(Saudi Arabia) Omar Al-Dasmal	(Saudi Arabia) Bisha	None	
31 October 2020	End of season	DF	12	(Saudi Arabia) Salem Al-Hamdan	(Saudi Arabia) Al-Nojoom	None	
2 February 2021	End of season	FW	21	(Saudi Arabia) Abdullah Hadhereti	(Saudi Arabia) Al-Jabalain	None	
5 February 2021	End of season	MF	6	(Romania) Mihai Bordeianu	(Romania) CFR Cluj	None	
7 February 2021	End of season	DF	13	(Saudi Arabia) Omar Al-Najem	(Saudi Arabia) Al-Bukiryah	None	
8 February 2021	End of season	FW	–	(Chad) Mohammed Fuesrai	(Saudi Arabia) Bisha	None	

== Competitions ==
=== Overview ===
Competition	Record							
Competition	G	W	D	L	GF	GA	GD	Win %
Pro League	30	8	11	11	41	47	−6	26.67
King Cup	2	1	0	1	2	2	+0	50.00
Total	32	9	11	12	43	49	−6	28.13

Updated to match played 30 May 2021
Source: Competitions

=== Pro League ===
==== League table ====
Pos	Team	Pld	W	D	L	GF	GA	GD	Pts	Qualification or relegation
12	Al-Batin	30	9	9	12	43	55	−12	36 (Note: Positions determined by head-to-head points: Al-Faisaly: 16 pts; Al-Raed: 15 pts; Damac: 13 pts; Al-Batin: 12 pts; Abha: 3 pts.)	
13	Abha	30	10	6	14	42	50	−8	36	
14	Al-Qadsiah (R)	30	8	11	11	41	47	−6	35	Relegation to MS League
15	Al-Wehda (R)	30	9	5	16	40	60	−20	32	Relegation to MS League
16	Al-Ain (R)	30	5	5	20	34	64	−30	20	Relegation to MS League

Source: spl.com source=إحصائيات رابطة دوري المحترفين السعودي 2020-2021
Rules for classification: 1) Points; 2) Head-to-head points; 3) Head-to-head goal difference; 4) Total goal difference; 5) Total goals scored; 6) Fair-play points (Note: Head-to-head record is used only after all the matches between the teams in question have been played).
(R) Relegated

==== Results summary ====
Overall								Home						Away					
Pld	W	D	L	GF	GA	GD	Pts	W	D	L	GF	GA	GD	W	D	L	GF	GA	GD
30	8	11	11	41	47	−6	35	5	5	5	22	24	−2	3	6	6	19	23	−4

Last updated: 30 May 2021.
Source: spl.com.sa

==== Results by round ====
Round	1	2	3	4	5	6	7	8	9	10	11	12	13	14	15	16	17	18	19	20	21	22	23	24	25	26	27	28	29	30
Ground	A	H	H	A	H	A	H	A	H	H	A	H	A	H	A	H	A	A	H	A	H	A	H	A	A	H	A	H	A	H
Result	L	W	W	L	D	L	W	W	L	L	D	W	D	D	D	D	D	W	W	D	L	D	D	L	W	L	L	L	L	D
Position	13	9	6	9	9	10	10	6	8	10	10	10	9	10	9	8	9	8	5	6	9	9	8	8	8	10	11	11	12	14

Updated to match(es) played on 30 May 2021. Source: spl.com.sa
A = Away; H = Home; W = Win; D = Draw; L = Loss

==== Matches ====
All times are local, AST (UTC+3).

Win Draw Loss Postponed

17 October 2020 1	Al-Wehda	2–1	Al-Qadsiah	Mecca
20:00	Botía (yellow card) 45+3'; Petratos 89' (pen.); Abdu Jaber 90+5'	Report	Asprilla (yellow card) 23'; Al-Amri 31' (pen.); Andria (yellow card) 39'; Al-Muwallad (yellow card) 42'; Al-Zayni (yellow card) 71'	Stadium: King Abdul Aziz Stadium; Attendance: 0 Referee: Khaled Salwi

23 October 2020 2	Al-Qadsiah	2–1	Damac	Khobar
17:40	Williams (yellow card) 52', (goal) 66'; Abo Shararah (yellow card) 56'; Asprilla 78' (pen.); Stanley (red card) 90+4'	Report	Al-Rio (yellow card) 65'; Chenihi 69'; Chafaï (yellow card) 77'; Al-Ammar (yellow card) 82'	Stadium: Prince Saud bin Jalawi Stadium; Attendance: 0 Referee: Faisal Al-Blwi

29 October 2020 3	Al-Qadsiah	1–0	Al-Taawoun	Khobar
19:50	Al-Yami (yellow card) 68'; Williams (yellow card) 76'; Vitas 79'	Report	Assiri (yellow card) 24'; Al-Hamad (yellow card) 50'; Al-Nabit (yellow card) 70'	Stadium: Prince Saud bin Jalawi Stadium; Attendance: 0 Referee: Raed Al-Zahrani

7 November 2020 4	Al-Nassr	2–0	Al-Qadsiah	Riyadh
19:45	Al-Khalaf (yellow card) 38'; Al-Amri 47'; Al-Buraikan 65'; Ali (yellow card) 73'	Report	Edson (yellow card) 17'; Stanley (yellow card) 24'; Al-Yami (yellow card) 32'	Stadium: Prince Faisal bin Fahd Stadium; Attendance: 0 Referee: Turki Al-Khudhayr

23 November 2020 5	Al-Qadsiah	2–2	Al-Batin	Dammam
17:25	Williams (yellow card) 21'; Al-Amri 26' (pen.), (yellow card) 64'; Al-Najar (red card) 51'; Al-Yami 71'	Report	Rayhi 2'; Sami (yellow card) 11'; El Jebli (red card) 51'; Sharahili 80'; Hyland (yellow card) 90+3'	Stadium: Prince Mohamed bin Fahd Stadium; Attendance: 0 Referee: Abdullah Al-Harbi

27 November 2020 6	Al-Ittihad	1–0	Al-Qadsiah	Jeddah
19:40	Rodrigues 18'; Hegazi (yellow card) 51'	Report	Al-Amri (yellow card) 40'	Stadium: King Abdullah Sports City; Attendance: 0 Referee: Khaled Al-Teris

6 December 2020 7	Al-Qadsiah	2–1	Al-Shabab	Khobar
17:25	Asprilla 41'; Edson (yellow card) 58'; Andria 66'	Report	Diop 20'; Al-Abed (yellow card) 90+3'	Stadium: Prince Saud bin Jalawi Stadium; Attendance: 0 Referee: Majed Al-Shamrani

11 December 2020 8	Al-Ain	1–2	Al-Qadsiah	Al Bahah
15:35	Bastos 36'; Al-Qarni (yellow card) 70'	Report	Al-Amri 38', 79'; Al-Safri (yellow card) 77'	Stadium: King Saud Sport City Stadium; Attendance: 0 Referee: Sami Al-Jires

21 December 2020 9	Al-Qadsiah	1–3	Al-Hilal	Khobar
17:30	Vitas (yellow card) 25'; Bordeianu (yellow card) 50'; Stanley 57'	Report	Gomis 14' (pen.); Carrillo 23'; S. Al-Dawsari 47'; Al-Olayan (yellow card) 75'	Stadium: Prince Saud bin Jalawi Stadium; Attendance: 0 Referee: Shukri Al-Hanfoush

27 December 2020 10	Al-Qadsiah	1–2	Al-Ettifaq	Khobar
19:40	Al-Amri 43' (pen.); Al-Yami (yellow card) 50'; Al-Muwallad (yellow card) 57'; Al-Shangeati (yellow card) 73'; Stanley (yellow card) 81'	Report	Doukara 25'; Souza (yellow card) 28'; Kiss (yellow card) 42'; Hazazi 52'; Hawsawi (yellow card) 63'	Stadium: Prince Saud bin Jalawi Stadium; Attendance: 0 Referee: Faisal Al-Blwi

2 January 2021 11	Al-Raed	2–2	Al-Qadsiah	Buraidah
15:25	Nikolić 15', 41'; Miletić (yellow card) 50' (yellow-red card) 90+2'; Al-Mogren (yellow card) 65'; Al-Dossari (yellow card) 71'	Report	Asprilla 55'; Bordeianu (yellow card) 77'; Ohawuchi 90+1'	Stadium: King Abdullah Sport City Stadium; Attendance: 0 Referee: Majed Al-Shamrani

8 January 2021 12	Al-Qadsiah	3–1	Al-Ahli	Khobar
17:40	Asprilla 12', (yellow card) 42'; Hazazi (yellow card) 45+3'; Al-Yami 45+3'; Al-Shoeil (yellow card) 51' (yellow-red card) 84'; Edson (yellow card) 72'; Al-Amri 76'	Report	Hassoun (yellow card) 20'; Ghareeb 88'	Stadium: Prince Saud bin Jalawi Stadium; Attendance: 0 Referee: Abdullah Al-Harbi

14 January 2021 13	Al-Faisaly	2–2	Al-Qadsiah	Al Majma'ah
15:30	Tavares 13' (pen.); Silva (yellow card) 36'; Malayekah (yellow card) 54'; Guilherme 60'	Report	Asprilla (yellow card) 37'; Al-Amri 55' (pen.); Al-Shangeati 88'	Stadium: Al Majma'ah Sports City; Attendance: 0 Referee: Shukri Al-Hanfoush

19 January 2021 14	Al-Qadsiah	1–1	Al-Fateh	Khobar
17:50	Al-Dawsari 29'; Williams (yellow card) 90+8'	Report	Al-Fuhaid (yellow card) 59'; Boushal (yellow card) 80' te Vrede 90+9' (pen.)	Stadium: Prince Saud bin Jalawi Stadium; Attendance: 0 Referee: Turki Al-Khudhayr

24 January 2021 15	Abha	2–2	Al-Qadsiah	Abha
15:55	Al-Amri 20'; Tahrat (yellow card) 39'; Bguir 42'; Atouchi (yellow card) 66'	Report	Al-Amri 50' (pen.); Andria 59'	Stadium: Prince Sultan bin Abdul Aziz Stadium; Attendance: 0 Referee: Abdullah Al-Harbi

31 January 2021 16	Al-Qadsiah	2–2	Al-Wehda	Khobar
18:00	Williams (yellow card) 18'; Al-Amri 53', (yellow card) 89'; Vitas (yellow card) 73' (yellow-red card) 82'; Andria 78'	Report	Al-Ghamdi 15'; Anselmo 29'; Al-Jayzani (yellow card) 52'; Kariri (yellow card) 90+5'	Stadium: Prince Saud bin Jalawi Stadium; Attendance: 0 Referee: Khalid Al-Johani

6 February 2021 17	Damac	2–2	Al-Qadsiah	Abha
16:00	Hamzi 35'; Abo Shararah (yellow card) 81'; Zelaya 88'	Report	Al-Amri 42'; Al-Dawsari (yellow card) 56' (yellow-red card) 90+4'; Al-Shangeati 86'	Stadium: Prince Sultan bin Abdul Aziz Stadium; Attendance: 0 Referee: Mohammed Al-Qarni

13 February 2021 18	Al-Taawoun	0–2	Al-Qadsiah	Buraidah
15:50	Amissi (yellow card) 26'; Al-Mousa (yellow card) 39'	Report	Andria 6'; Al-Amri 54'	Stadium: King Abdullah Sport City Stadium; Attendance: 0 Referee: Khaled Salwi

18 February 2021 19	Al-Qadsiah	1–0	Al-Nassr	Khobar
18:10	Al-Shoeil (yellow card) 8'; Edson (yellow card) 17', (goal) 23'; Andria (yellow card) 30'; Williams (yellow card) 52'; Abdi (yellow card) 83'; Masrahi (yellow card) 86'; Al-Yami (yellow card) 90+2' (yellow-red card) 90+6'	Report	Lajami (yellow card) 90+5'	Stadium: Prince Saud bin Jalawi Stadium; Attendance: 0 Referee: Faisal Al-Blwi

23 February 2021 20	Al-Batin	2–2	Al-Qadsiah	Hafar al-Batin
15:45	Abreu 45+2'; Al Abbas 73'	Report	Stanley 17'; Williams (yellow card) 43'; Al-Dawsari (yellow card) 53'; Andria 75'	Stadium: Al-Batin Club Stadium; Attendance: 0 Referee: Shukri Al-Hanfoush

28 February 2021 21	Al-Qadsiah	1–4	Al-Ittihad	Dammam
18:15	Andria 31'; Al-Amri (yellow card) 42'; Masrahi (yellow card) 43'	Report	Prijović 43', 69', 82'; Al-Sahafi 65'	Stadium: Prince Mohamed bin Fahd Stadium; Attendance: 0 Referee: Mohammed Al-Harbi

5 March 2021 22	Al-Shabab	1–1	Al-Qadsiah	Riyadh
18:35	Banega (yellow card) 35'; Al-Ammar 90+1'	Report	Al-Nattar (yellow card) 16'; Edson (yellow card) 33'; Stanley 45'; Asprilla (yellow card) 59'; Al-Dawsari (yellow card) 83'; Al-Safri (yellow card) 85'	Stadium: Prince Khalid bin Sultan Stadium; Attendance: 0 Referee: Mohammed Al-Qarni

10 March 2021 23	Al-Qadsiah	3–3	Al-Ain	Khobar
18:25	Ohawuchi (yellow card) 28'; James 37', 76'; Al-Dawsari (yellow card) 50'; Vitas (yellow card) 57'; Al-Shoeil (yellow card) 85'; Al-Nattar (yellow card) 87'; Andria 90+3'	Report	Halawani 31'; Getterson 73' (pen.); Moutari 79'; Juanpi (yellow card) 85'; Bukhari (yellow card) 90+5'; Al-Jamaan (yellow card) 90+8'	Stadium: Prince Saud bin Jalawi Stadium; Attendance: 0 Referee: Khaled Al-Johani

20 March 2021 24	Al-Hilal	1–0	Al-Qadsiah	Riyadh
20:45	Carrillo 51'	Report	Al-Dawsari (yellow card) 75'; Al-Nattar (yellow card) 87'	Stadium: Prince Faisal bin Fahd Stadium; Attendance: 0 Referee: Janny Sikazwe (Zambia)

10 April 2021 25	Al-Ettifaq	1–3	Al-Qadsiah	Dammam
20:15	Azaro 30'; Doukara (yellow card) 62'; Mahnashi (yellow card) 73'; Al-Khateeb (yellow card) 90+6'	Report	Asprilla 14' (pen.), 53' (pen.), 73' (pen.), (yellow card) 24'	Stadium: Prince Mohamed bin Fahd Stadium; Attendance: 0 Referee: Turki Al-Khudhayr

16 April 2021 26	Al-Qadsiah	0–1	Al-Raed	Khobar
21:35	Al-Nattar (yellow card) 30'; Asprilla (yellow card) 56' (yellow-red card) 67'; Al-Amri (yellow card) 64'	Report	Al-Farhan (yellow card) 38'; El Berkaoui 90+6', (yellow card) 90+7'	Stadium: Prince Saud bin Jalawi Stadium; Attendance: 0 Referee: Majed Al-Shamrani

29 April 2021 28	Al-Qadsiah	1–2	Al-Faisaly	Khobar
21:35	Stanley (yellow card) 13'; Al-Shoeil (yellow card) 24'; Al-Amri 74' (pen.)	Report	Guilherme 32', 90+6'; Kaabi (yellow card) 35' (yellow-red card) 66'	Stadium: Prince Saud bin Jalawi Stadium; Attendance: 0 Referee: Rédouane Jiyed (Morocco)

14 May 2021 27	Al-Ahli	1–0	Al-Qadsiah	Jeddah
21:00	Hassoun (yellow card) 55' (yellow-red card) 79'; Fettouhi (yellow card) 57'; Al Somah 68' (pen.); Al-Mousa (yellow card) 72'; Al-Moasher (yellow card) 89'; Mitriță (yellow card) 90+4'	Report	Williams (yellow card) 10'; Al-Amri (yellow card) 85'	Stadium: King Abdullah Sports City Reserve Stadium; Attendance: 0 Referee: Turki Al-Khudhayr

25 May 2021 29	Al-Fateh	3–0	Al-Qadsiah	Al-Hasa
21:00	te Vrede 19'; Cueva 58'; Soudani 68'	Report	Al-Amri (yellow card) 5'; Al-Shoeil (yellow card) 55'	Stadium: Prince Abdullah bin Jalawi Stadium; Attendance: 1,573; Referee: Sultan Al-Harbi

30 May 2021 30	Al-Qadsiah	1–1	Abha	Khobar
21:00	Asprilla 45+1' (pen.); Al-Safri (yellow card) 60'; Vitas (yellow card) 90+3'	Report	Al-Sharari (yellow card) 5'; Al Hamsal (yellow card) 56'; Atouchi (yellow card) 60'; Al-Amri (yellow card) 82', (goal) 85'; Mhamdi (yellow card) 90'; Al-Ruwaili (yellow card) 90+3'	Stadium: Prince Saud bin Jalawi Stadium; Attendance: 1,273; Referee: Mohammed Al-Hoaish

=== King Cup ===
All times are local, AST (UTC+3).

16 December 2020 Round of 16	Al-Qadsiah	1–0	Al-Shabab	Khobar
17:25	Bordeianu (yellow card) 67'; Al-Amri 89' (pen.), (yellow card) 90'; Al-Yami (yellow card) 90+1'	Report	Martins (yellow card) 45'; Al-Hamdan (yellow card) 80'; Al-Dubaysh (yellow card) 82'; Guanca (yellow card) 89'	Stadium: Prince Saud bin Jalawi Stadium; Attendance: 0 Referee: Sultan Al-Harbi

15 March 2021 Quarter-finals	Al-Taawoun	2–1	Al-Qadsiah	Buraidah
20:45	Tawamba 10'; Al-Zubaidi (yellow card) 16'; Al-Nabit (yellow card) 44', (goal) 58'; Amissi (yellow card) 67'; Abousaban (yellow card) 74'; Al-Ghamdi (yellow card) 90+8'	Report	Hazazi (yellow card) 3'; Al-Amri 37'; Williams (yellow card) 90+9'	Stadium: King Abdullah Sport City Stadium; Attendance: 0 Referee: Mohammed Al-Hoaish

== Statistics ==
=== Appearances ===
Last updated on 30 May 2021.

No.	Pos	Nat	Player	Total		Pro League		King Cup	
No.	Pos	Nat	Player	Apps	Goals	Apps	Goals	Apps	Goals
Goalkeepers
30	GK	(Saudi Arabia) KSA	Mohammed Al-Waked	5	0	2+1	0	1+1	0
37	GK	(Saudi Arabia) KSA	Abdulaziz Al-Shehri	0	0	0	0	0	0
55	GK	(Saudi Arabia) KSA	Faisel Masrahi	29	0	28	0	1	0
97	GK	(Saudi Arabia) KSA	Emad Fida	0	0	0	0	0	0
Defenders
3	DF	(Saudi Arabia) KSA	Adel Al-Muwallad	3	0	2+1	0	0	0
4	DF	(Australia) AUS	Rhys Williams	30	1	28	1	2	0
12	DF	(Saudi Arabia) KSA	Anas Zabani	8	0	2+6	0	0	0
17	DF	(Saudi Arabia) KSA	Faris Abdi	10	0	2+8	0	0	0
20	DF	(Serbia) SRB	Uroš Vitas	27	1	25	1	2	0
23	DF	(Saudi Arabia) KSA	Ibrahim Al-Shoeil	18	0	14+4	0	0	0
25	DF	(Saudi Arabia) KSA	Khalifah Al-Dawsari	29	1	22+5	1	2	0
27	DF	(Saudi Arabia) KSA	Talal Hawsawi	2	0	0+2	0	0	0
50	DF	(Saudi Arabia) KSA	Jehad Thakri	1	0	0+1	0	0	0
88	DF	(Saudi Arabia) KSA	Hamad Al-Yami	31	2	29	2	2	0
Midfielders
5	MF	(Brazil) BRA	Edson	23	1	21	1	2	0
7	MF	(Saudi Arabia) KSA	Hassan Al-Amri	29	14	26+1	12	2	2
8	MF	(Saudi Arabia) KSA	Abdulrahman Al-Safri	21	0	8+12	0	0+1	0
14	MF	(Saudi Arabia) KSA	Mansour Al-Najjar	6	0	2+4	0	0	0
15	MF	(Saudi Arabia) KSA	Ahmed Al-Fraidi	1	0	0+1	0	0	0
16	MF	(Saudi Arabia) KSA	Nawaf Al-Azizi	10	0	0+9	0	0+1	0
18	MF	(Saudi Arabia) KSA	Naif Hazazi	27	0	18+7	0	1+1	0
19	MF	(Saudi Arabia) KSA	Abdulmohsen Al-Qahtani	2	0	2	0	0	0
24	MF	(Saudi Arabia) KSA	Hassan Abu Sharara	12	0	5+6	0	1	0
66	MF	(Saudi Arabia) KSA	Saleh Aboulshamat	3	0	0+3	0	0	0
70	MF	(Colombia) COL	Danilo Asprilla	18	8	15+2	8	1	0
77	MF	(Saudi Arabia) KSA	Omar Al-Zayni	2	0	0+2	0	0	0
96	MF	(Saudi Arabia) KSA	Hussain Al-Nattar	13	0	4+9	0	0	0
Forwards
2	FW	(Madagascar) MAD	Carolus Andria	30	7	21+7	7	1+1	0
10	FW	(Nigeria) NGA	Stanley Ohawuchi	30	4	28	4	2	0
31	FW	(Saudi Arabia) KSA	Waleed Al-Shangeati	14	2	2+11	2	0+1	0
49	FW	(Saudi Arabia) KSA	Eissa Al Thakrallah	1	0	0+1	0	0	0
90	FW	(Nigeria) NGA	Leke James	11	2	10	2	1	0
Players sent out on loan this season
6	MF	(Romania) ROU	Mihai Bordeianu	15	0	12+2	0	1	0
13	DF	(Saudi Arabia) KSA	Omar Al-Najem	0	0	0	0	0	0
21	FW	(Saudi Arabia) KSA	Abdullah Hadhereti	4	0	2+2	0	0	0

=== Goalscorers ===
Rank	No.	Pos	Nat	Name	Pro League	King Cup	Total
1	7	MF	(Saudi Arabia)	Hassan Al-Amri	12	2	14
2	70	MF	(Colombia)	Danilo Asprilla	8	0	8
3	2	FW	(Madagascar)	Carolus Andria	7	0	7
4	10	FW	(Nigeria)	Stanley Ohawuchi	4	0	4
5	31	FW	(Saudi Arabia)	Waleed Al-Shangeati	2	0	2
5	88	DF	(Saudi Arabia)	Hamad Al-Yami	2	0	2
5	90	FW	(Nigeria)	Leke James	2	0	2
8	4	DF	(Australia)	Rhys Williams	1	0	1
8	5	MF	(Brazil)	Edson	1	0	1
8	20	DF	(Serbia)	Uroš Vitas	1	0	1
8	25	DF	(Saudi Arabia)	Khalifah Al-Dawsari	1	0	1
Own goal					0	0	0
Total					41	2	43

Last Updated: 30 May 2021

=== Assists ===
Rank	No.	Pos	Nat	Name	Pro League	King Cup	Total
1	10	FW	(Nigeria)	Stanley Ohawuchi	7	1	8
2	7	MF	(Saudi Arabia)	Hassan Al-Amri	5	0	5
3	4	DF	(Australia)	Rhys Williams	3	0	3
4	88	DF	(Saudi Arabia)	Hamad Al-Yami	2	0	2
5	5	MF	(Brazil)	Edson	1	0	1
5	31	FW	(Saudi Arabia)	Waleed Al-Shangeati	1	0	1
5	70	MF	(Colombia)	Danilo Asprilla	1	0	1
5	90	FW	(Nigeria)	Leke James	1	0	1
Total					21	1	22

Last Updated: 30 May 2021

=== Clean sheets ===
Rank	No.	Pos	Nat	Name	Pro League	King Cup	Total
1	55	GK	(Saudi Arabia)	Faisel Masrahi	3	1	4
2	30	GK	(Saudi Arabia)	Mohammed Al-Waked	0	1	1
Total					3	1	4

Last Updated: 30 May 2021
