= 2020–21 Al-Wehda Club season =

Al-Wehda
2020–21 season
- President: Sultan Azhar
- Manager: Ivo Vieira (until 2 February); Mahmoud Al-Hadid (from 2 February until 21 March); Georgios Donis (from 23 March)
- Stadium: King Abdul Aziz Stadium
- SPL: 15th (relegated)
- King Cup: Round of 16 (knocked out by Al-Ittihad)
- Champions League: Play-off Round (knocked out by Al-Quwa Al-Jawiya)
- Top goalscorer: League: Youssouf Niakaté (11); All: Youssouf Niakaté (12)
- All statistics correct as of 30 May 2021.

The 2020–21 season was Al-Wehda's 37th non-consecutive season in the top flight of Saudi football and 76th year in existence as a football club. The club participated in the Pro League, King Cup and the AFC Champions League for the first time in their history.

The season covered the period from 22 September 2020 to 30 June 2021.

== Players ==
=== Squad information ===
As of 1 February 2021

Note: Flags indicate national team as defined under FIFA eligibility rules; some limited exceptions apply. Players may hold more than one non-FIFA nationality.

No.	Pos.	Nation	Player
1	GK	KSA	Raghid Al-Najjar
2	DF	KSA	Mohammed Al-Amri
3	MF	KSA	Hussain Al-Eisa
4	MF	KSA	Waleed Bakshween
5	DF	BRA	Pedro Henrique (on loan from Vitória de Guimarães)
6	DF	KSA	Abdullah Al-Hafith
7	MF	KSA	Mishari Al-Qahtani
8	MF	KSA	Mohammed Al-Qarni
9	MF	POR	Hernâni (on loan from Levante)
10	MF	AUS	Dimitri Petratos
12	MF	KSA	Abdulkareem Al-Qahtani
14	DF	ESP	Alberto Botía
17	DF	KSA	Ali Al-Zubaidi
18	FW	FRA	Youssouf Niakaté
19	FW	KSA	Thamer Al-Ali
20	FW	KSA	Jaber Asiri
21	GK	KSA	Ayman Al-Hussaini

No.	Pos.	Nation	Player
23	DF	KSA	Noor Al-Rashidi
24	MF	KSA	Mubarak Al-Suqoor
25	DF	KSA	Sulaiman Hazazi
26	GK	KSA	Abdullah Al-Owaishir
28	DF	KSA	Hamad Al-Jayzani
33	DF	KSA	Rakan Al-Harbi
38	DF	KSA	Naif Kariri
43	MF	KSA	Islam Hawsawi
49	MF	KSA	Sultan Al-Sawadi
66	GK	KSA	Basem Atallah
71	FW	ERI	Ahmed Abdu Jaber
77	MF	KSA	Ayman Al-Khulaif
87	MF	BRA	Anselmo
88	MF	KSA	Alaa Al Hejji
90	MF	KSA	Hazzaa Al-Ghamdi
91	MF	BRA	Luisinho
99	FW	KSA	Sultan Hawsawi

=== Out on loan ===
Note: Flags indicate national team as defined under FIFA eligibility rules; some limited exceptions apply. Players may hold more than one non-FIFA nationality.

No.	Pos.	Nation	Player
9	MF	AUS	Craig Goodwin (at Adelaide United until 30 June 2021)
13	GK	KSA	Abdulquddus Atiah (at Al-Adalah until 30 June 2021)

No.	Pos.	Nation	Player
44	MF	KSA	Hatem Belal (at Al-Bukayriyah until 30 June 2021)

== Transfers and loans ==
=== Transfers in ===
Entry date	Position	No.	Player	From club	Fee	Ref.
22 September 2020	GK	33	(Saudi Arabia) Ayman Al-Hussaini	(Saudi Arabia) Al-Thoqbah	Free	
22 September 2020	GK	66	(Saudi Arabia) Basem Atallah	(Saudi Arabia) Al-Ahli	Free	
22 September 2020	DF	2	(Saudi Arabia) Mohammed Al-Amri	(Saudi Arabia) Al-Raed	Free	
22 September 2020	MF	10	(Australia) Dimitri Petratos	(Australia) Newcastle Jets	Free	
22 September 2020	MF	12	(Saudi Arabia) Abdulkareem Al-Qahtani	(Saudi Arabia) Al-Fayha	Free	
22 September 2020	MF	29	(Saudi Arabia) Nawaf Al-Harthi	(Saudi Arabia) Al-Ain	End of loan	
22 September 2020	MF	77	(Saudi Arabia) Mohammed Sufyani	(Saudi Arabia) Jeddah	End of loan	
22 September 2020	MF	80	(Saudi Arabia) Khaled Ba Butain	(Saudi Arabia) Jeddah	End of loan	
22 September 2020	MF	88	(Saudi Arabia) Alaa Al Hejji	(Saudi Arabia) Al-Khaleej	Free	
22 September 2020	FW	99	(Saudi Arabia) Sultan Hawsawi	(Saudi Arabia) Al-Hilal	Free	
26 September 2020	MF	3	(Saudi Arabia) Hussain Al-Eisa	(Saudi Arabia) Al-Adalah	Undisclosed	
28 September 2020	DF	38	(Saudi Arabia) Naif Kariri	(Saudi Arabia) Ohod	Free	
7 October 2020	MF	13	(Saudi Arabia) Mubarak Al-Suqoor	(Saudi Arabia) Najran	Undisclosed	
16 October 2020	GK	26	(Saudi Arabia) Abdullah Al-Owaishir	(Saudi Arabia) Al-Nassr	Free	
16 October 2020	DF	6	(Saudi Arabia) Abdullah Al-Hafith	(Saudi Arabia) Al-Hilal	Free	

=== Loans in ===
Start date	End date	Position	No.	Player	From club	Fee	Ref.
5 October 2020	End of season	DF	5	(Brazil) Pedro Henrique	(Portugal) Vitória	None	
15 October 2020	End of season	MF	9	(Portugal) Hernâni	(Spain) Levante	None	

=== Transfers out ===
Exit date	Position	No.	Player	To club	Fee	Ref.
22 September 2020	GK	33	(Saudi Arabia) Abdullah Al-Jadaani	(Saudi Arabia) Al-Hilal	Free	
22 September 2020	DF	17	(Saudi Arabia) Ali Al-Zubaidi	(Saudi Arabia) Al-Ahli	End of loan	
22 September 2020	DF	88	(Saudi Arabia) Hassan Tambakti	(Saudi Arabia) Al-Shabab	End of loan	
22 September 2020	MF	29	(Saudi Arabia) Rakan Al-Shamlan	(Saudi Arabia) Al-Nassr	End of loan	
22 September 2020	MF	99	(Brazil) Élton	(United Arab Emirates) Al-Hamriyah	Free	
26 September 2020	FW	51	(Saudi Arabia) Mousa Madkhali	(Saudi Arabia) Al-Adalah	Free	
28 September 2020	DF	12	(Saudi Arabia) Abdulrahman Al-Rio	(Saudi Arabia) Damac	Undisclosed	
5 October 2020	DF	6	(Brazil) Renato Chaves	(Saudi Arabia) Al-Wehda	Free	
8 October 2020	DF	2	(Saudi Arabia) Radhi Al-Otaibi	(Saudi Arabia) Ohod	Free	
8 October 2020	MF	77	(Saudi Arabia) Mohammed Sufyani	(Saudi Arabia) Ohod	Free	
22 October 2020	DF	27	(Saudi Arabia) Fawaz Al-Sqoor	(Saudi Arabia) Al-Shabab	$1,200,000	
26 October 2020	DF	22	(Saudi Arabia) Faris Abdi	(Saudi Arabia) Al-Qadsiah	Undisclosed	
26 October 2020	MF	16	(Saudi Arabia) Ali Al-Nemer	(Saudi Arabia) Al-Taawoun	Free	
4 February 2021	MF	15	(Saudi Arabia) Jaber Mustafa	(Saudi Arabia) Al-Raed	Free	
7 February 2021	DF	–	(Mali) Anas Traoré	(Saudi Arabia) Al-Fayha	Free	

=== Loans out ===
Start date	End date	Position	No.	Player	To club	Fee	Ref.
14 October 2020	2 February 2021	MF	9	(Australia) Craig Goodwin	(Saudi Arabia) Abha	None	
16 October 2020	End of season	GK	13	(Saudi Arabia) Abdulquddus Atiah	(Saudi Arabia) Al-Adalah	None	
7 February 2021	End of season	DF	44	(Saudi Arabia) Hatem Belal	(Saudi Arabia) Al-Bukayriyah	None	
9 February 2021	End of season	MF	9	(Australia) Craig Goodwin	(Australia) Adelaide United	None	

== Pre-season ==
1 October 2020 Friendly	Al-Wehda (Saudi Arabia)	3–0	(Saudi Arabia) Abha	Jeddah, Saudi Arabia
18:45 AST	Al-Eisa; Al-Ghamdi; Hawsawi	Report		Stadium: King Abdullah Sports City Reserve Stadium

4 October 2020 Friendly	Al-Wehda (Saudi Arabia)	0–0	(Saudi Arabia) Al-Faisaly	Jeddah, Saudi Arabia
AST		Report		Stadium: King Abdullah Sports City Reserve Stadium

9 October 2020 Friendly	Al-Wehda (Saudi Arabia)	1–2	(Saudi Arabia) Al-Fateh	Jeddah, Saudi Arabia
19:00 AST	Kariri 18'	Report	Bendebka 51'; Otaif 74'	Stadium: King Abdullah Sports City Reserve Stadium

== Competitions ==
=== Overview ===
Competition	Record							
Competition	G	W	D	L	GF	GA	GD	Win %
Pro League	30	9	5	16	40	60	−20	30.00
King Cup	1	0	0	1	0	3	−3	0.00
Champions League	1	0	1	0	1	1	+0	0.00
Total	32	9	6	17	41	64	−23	28.13

Updated to match played 30 May 2021
Source: Competitions

=== Pro League ===
==== League table ====
Pos	Team	Pld	W	D	L	GF	GA	GD	Pts	Qualification or relegation
12	Al-Batin	30	9	9	12	43	55	−12	36 (Note: Positions determined by head-to-head points: Al-Faisaly: 16 pts; Al-Raed: 15 pts; Damac: 13 pts; Al-Batin: 12 pts; Abha: 3 pts.)	
13	Abha	30	10	6	14	42	50	−8	36	
14	Al-Qadsiah (R)	30	8	11	11	41	47	−6	35	Relegation to MS League
15	Al-Wehda (R)	30	9	5	16	40	60	−20	32	Relegation to MS League
16	Al-Ain (R)	30	5	5	20	34	64	−30	20	Relegation to MS League

Source: spl.com source=إحصائيات رابطة دوري المحترفين السعودي 2020-2021
Rules for classification: 1) Points; 2) Head-to-head points; 3) Head-to-head goal difference; 4) Total goal difference; 5) Total goals scored; 6) Fair-play points (Note: Head-to-head record is used only after all the matches between the teams in question have been played).
(R) Relegated

==== Results summary ====
Overall								Home						Away					
Pld	W	D	L	GF	GA	GD	Pts	W	D	L	GF	GA	GD	W	D	L	GF	GA	GD
30	9	5	16	40	60	−20	32	3	3	9	20	32	−12	6	2	7	20	28	−8

Last updated: 30 May 2021.
Source: spl.com.sa

==== Results by round ====
Round	1	2	3	4	5	6	7	8	9	10	11	12	13	14	15	16	17	18	19	20	21	22	23	24	25	26	27	28	29	30
Ground	H	A	H	H	A	H	H	A	H	A	A	H	A	A	H	A	H	A	A	H	A	A	H	A	H	H	A	H	H	A
Result	W	L	L	L	L	W	L	W	W	W	W	D	D	L	L	D	L	W	W	L	L	L	L	L	L	L	W	D	D	L
Position	2	10	12	14	14	14	14	13	9	6	5	5	7	8	10	9	10	9	7	9	11	12	14	14	15	15	14	14	15	15

Updated to match(es) played on 30 May 2021. Source: spl.com.sa
A = Away; H = Home; W = Win; D = Draw; L = Loss

==== Matches ====
All times are local, AST (UTC+3).

Win Draw Loss Postponed

17 October 2020 1	Al-Wehda	2–1	Al-Qadsiah	Mecca
20:00	Botía (yellow card) 45+3'; Petratos 89' (pen.); Abdu Jaber 90+5'	Report	Asprilla (yellow card) 23'; Al-Amri 31' (pen.); Andria (yellow card) 39'; Al-Muwallad (yellow card) 42'; Al-Zayni (yellow card) 71'	Stadium: King Abdul Aziz Stadium; Attendance: 0 Referee: Khaled Salwi

22 October 2020 2	Al-Ahli	1–0	Al-Wehda	Jeddah
19:55	Mitriță 73'	Report	Al-Qarni (yellow card) 43'; Bakshween (yellow card) 85'	Stadium: King Abdullah Sports City; Attendance: 0 Referee: Turki Al-Khudhayr

30 October 2020 3	Al-Wehda	1–2	Al-Faisaly	Mecca
19:50	Niakaté 6'; Pedrão (yellow card) 45+5'; Al-Khulaif (yellow card) 86'; Anselmo (yellow card) 88'	Report	Tavares 19'; Qassem (yellow card) 45+1'; Fallatah (yellow card) 62'; Al-Qahtani 75'	Stadium: King Abdul Aziz Stadium; Attendance: 0 Referee: Khaled Al-Teris

5 November 2020 4	Al-Wehda	2–3	Al-Raed	Mecca
19:45	Bakshween (yellow card) 27'; Niakaté 33'; Al-Zubaidi (yellow card) 36'; Hernâni 39'; Al-Jayzani (yellow card) 72'; Botía (yellow card) 90+3'	Report	Balghaith 2'; El Berkaoui 18'; Al-Mogren (yellow card) 37'; Al-Fahad (yellow card) 60'; Daoudi (yellow card) 71'; Al-Showaish (yellow card) 90'; Adam 90+4'	Stadium: King Abdul Aziz Stadium; Attendance: 0 Referee: Majed Al-Shamrani

24 November 2020 5	Al-Taawoun	1–0	Al-Wehda	Buraidah
17:50	Al-Jouei (yellow card) 55'; Al-Hafith 72' (o.g.)	Report	Al-Jayzani (red card) 52'	Stadium: King Abdullah Sport City Stadium; Attendance: 0 Referee: Sultan Al-Harbi

29 November 2020 6	Al-Wehda	3–2	Al-Batin	Mecca
18:10	Petratos 20' (pen.), 54', 86'; Anselmo (yellow card) 33'; Botía (yellow card) 34'; Pedrão (yellow card) 90+5'	Report	Abreu 4', 90'; Chaves (yellow card) 25'; Al Khairi (yellow card) 63'; Hyland (yellow card) 87'	Stadium: King Abdul Aziz Stadium; Attendance: 0 Referee: Faisal Al-Blwi

6 December 2020 7	Al-Wehda	1–2	Al-Ittihad	Mecca
19:45	Al-Hafith (yellow card) 57'; Kariri (yellow card) 59'; Petratos 90' (pen.)	Report	Rodrigues 28'; Al-Jebreen (yellow card) 80'; Romarinho 84' (pen.)	Stadium: King Abdul Aziz Stadium; Attendance: 0 Referee: Khaled Salwi

13 December 2020 8	Al-Hilal	1–2	Al-Wehda	Riyadh
19:45	Gomis 70'; Al-Bulaihi (yellow card) 85'	Report	Petratos 7'; Al-Eisa (yellow card) 21'; Bakshween (yellow card) 64'; Abdu Jaber (yellow card) 75', (goal) 90+1'	Stadium: King Fahd International Stadium; Attendance: 0 Referee: Majed Al-Shamrani

22 December 2020 9	Al-Wehda	2–1	Al-Ain	Mecca
18:20	Hernâni 25'; Al-Harbi 77' (o.g.); Anselmo (yellow card) 90+2'	Report	Moutari 28'; Bastos (yellow card) 51'; Saeed Al-Qarni (yellow card) 74'; Fouad (yellow card) 84'	Stadium: King Abdul Aziz Stadium; Attendance: 0 Referee: Khaled Al-Johani

27 December 2020 10	Abha	0–1	Al-Wehda	Abha
15:40	Amr (yellow card) 32'; Mhamdi (yellow card) 45'	Report	Abdu Jaber 40'; Anselmo (yellow card) 85'; Al Hejji (yellow card) 90+3'	Stadium: Prince Sultan bin Abdul Aziz Stadium; Attendance: 0 Referee: Mohammed Al-Esmaiel

1 January 2021 11	Al-Ettifaq	1–2	Al-Wehda	Dammam
17:35	Kiss 68' (pen.)	Report	Niakaté 52', 89'; Al-Eisa (yellow card) 53'; Botía (yellow card) 59'; Kariri (yellow card) 75'; Al Hejji (yellow card) 90+4'; Al-Owaishir (yellow card) 90+6'	Stadium: Prince Mohamed bin Fahd Stadium; Attendance: 0 Referee: Raed Al-Zahrani

7 January 2021 12	Al-Wehda	0–0	Al-Fateh	Mecca
18:35	Niakaté (yellow card) 54'; Pedrão (yellow card) 71'; Bakshween (yellow card) 90+4'	Report	Naji (yellow card) 57'; Al-Othman (yellow card) 90'	Stadium: King Abdul Aziz Stadium; Attendance: 0 Referee: Sultan Al-Harbi

15 January 2021 13	Damac	0–0	Al-Wehda	Abha
15:55	Lema (yellow card) 19'; Abdullah (yellow card) 54'; Abo Shararah (yellow card) 57'; Al-Zubaidi (yellow card) 82'	Report	Kariri (red card) 45+4'; Botía (yellow card) 61'; Anselmo (yellow card) 76'	Stadium: Prince Sultan bin Abdul Aziz Stadium; Attendance: 0 Referee: Abdullah Al-Harbi

20 January 2021 14	Al-Nassr	3–1	Al-Wehda	Riyadh
20:10	Martínez 8'; Al-Ghamdi (yellow card) 19'; Al-Sulayhem (yellow card) 56'; Petros 67', 87' (pen.); Al-Buraikan (yellow card) 90+3'	Report	Luisinho 5'; Anselmo (yellow card) 19'; Al-Hafith (yellow card) 47'; Bakshween (yellow card) 70'; Niakaté (yellow card) 77'; Botía (yellow card) 82'; Hernâni (yellow card) 86'; Abdu Jaber (yellow card) 89'	Stadium: Mrsool Park; Attendance: 0 Referee: Majed Al-Shamrani

25 January 2021 15	Al-Wehda	2–4	Al-Shabab	Mecca
18:45	Anselmo 20'; Al-Ghamdi (yellow card) 35', (goal) 37'; Al-Hafith (yellow card) 65'; Bakshween (yellow card) 69'	Report	Bajandouh (yellow card) 4'; Al-Hamdan (yellow card) 31', (goal) 80'; Sebá 43', 76'; Al-Zori 55'	Stadium: King Abdul Aziz Stadium; Attendance: 0 Referee: Faisal Al-Blwi

31 January 2021 16	Al-Qadsiah	2–2	Al-Wehda	Khobar
18:00	Williams (yellow card) 18'; Al-Amri 53', (yellow card) 89'; Vitas (yellow card) 73' (yellow-red card) 82'; Andria 78'	Report	Al-Ghamdi 15'; Anselmo 29'; Al-Jayzani (yellow card) 52'; Kariri (yellow card) 90+5'	Stadium: Prince Saud bin Jalawi Stadium; Attendance: 0 Referee: Khalid Al-Johani

5 February 2021 17	Al-Wehda	2–4	Al-Ahli	Mecca
20:15	Al-Eisa 17'; Niakaté 24'; Luisinho (yellow card) 90+5'	Report	Al-Mogahwi 7'; Al-Moasher 13'; Mitriță 90+1'; Al Somah 90+3'	Stadium: King Abdul Aziz Stadium; Attendance: 0 Referee: Khaled Al-Teris

12 February 2021 18	Al-Faisaly	2–4	Al-Wehda	Al Majma'ah
15:45	Malayekah (yellow card) 12'; Merkel (yellow card) 33'; Silva 54'; Al-Saiari 67'	Report	Niakaté 12' (pen.), 48', 85'; Hazazi (yellow card) 14'; Al-Sqoor (yellow card) 16'; Botía (yellow card) 80'; Petratos 90'	Stadium: Al Majma'ah Sports City; Attendance: 0 Referee: Mohammed Al-Nuhait

17 February 2021 19	Al-Raed	1–3	Al-Wehda	Buraidah
15:55	Al-Harbi 16'; Al-Zain (yellow card) 85'	Report	Botía (yellow card) 4'; Anselmo (yellow card) 20', (goal) 44', 66'; Bakshween (yellow card) 84'; Al Hejji (yellow card) 89'; Hernâni 90+4'	Stadium: King Abdullah Sport City Stadium; Attendance: 0 Referee: Majed Al-Shamrani

22 February 2021 20	Al-Wehda	0–2	Al-Taawoun	Mecca
19:00	Al-Jayzani (yellow card) 76'; Anselmo (yellow card) 84'; Bakshween (yellow card) 90+4'	Report	Kaku 24'; Abousaban (yellow card) 40'; Al-Abdulmenem (yellow card) 73'; Amissi (yellow card) 84'; Al-Nabit (yellow card) 87'; Tawamba 89' (pen.)	Stadium: King Abdul Aziz Stadium; Attendance: 0 Referee: Faisal Al-Blwi

27 February 2021 21	Al-Batin	3–0	Al-Wehda	Hafar al-Batin
15:50	Obaid 37'; Abreu 59', 84'; Campaña (yellow card) 68'	Report		Stadium: Al-Batin Club Stadium; Attendance: 0 Referee: Abdullah Al-Harbi

5 March 2021 22	Al-Ittihad	4–2	Al-Wehda	Mecca
20:35	Abdulhamid (yellow card) 24'; Romarinho 52' (pen.), 72', 90+5'; Al-Muwallad 66'	Report	Al-Qarni (yellow card) 42'; Hernâni (yellow card) 64', (goal) 74'; Luisinho (yellow card) 79'; Abdu Jaber 84'	Stadium: King Abdul Aziz Stadium; Attendance: 0 Referee: Ahmed Al-Rumaikhani

11 March 2021 23	Al-Wehda	2–4	Al-Hilal	Mecca
19:05	Niakaté 15', 40' (pen.), (yellow card) 85'	Report	Gomis 35' (pen.), 55', 75'; Vietto 36', (yellow card) 74'	Stadium: King Abdul Aziz Stadium; Attendance: 0 Referee: Turki Al-Khudhayr

15 March 2021 25	Al-Wehda	1–4	Abha	Mecca
19:10	Anselmo (yellow card) 40'; Niakaté 85' (pen.)	Report	Al-Barakah 23'; Bguir 35'; Atouchi (yellow card) 48'; Strandberg 66'; Sharahili 79'; Amr (yellow card) 83'	Stadium: King Abdul Aziz Stadium; Attendance: 0 Referee: Khaled Al-Teris

21 March 2021 24	Al-Ain	4–0	Al-Wehda	Al Bahah
16:10	Ndiaye 45'; Bastos (yellow card) 68'; Moutari 81'; Al-Jamaan 87'; Sufyani (yellow card) 88'; Fouad 90+2'	Report	Al-Owaishir (yellow card) 46'; Al-Qarni (yellow card) 90'	Stadium: King Saud Sport City Stadium; Attendance: 0 Referee: Sultan Al-Harbi

17 April 2021 26	Al-Wehda	0–1	Al-Ettifaq	Mecca
22:10	Al Hejji (yellow card) 84'	Report	Al-Kwikbi 71'	Stadium: King Abdul Aziz Stadium; Attendance: 0 Referee: Mohammed Al-Esmaiel

15 May 2021 27	Al-Fateh	2–3	Al-Wehda	Al-Hasa
18:55	Batna 20' (pen.); Cueva 37'; Al-Yousef (yellow card) 45+4'; Buhimed (yellow card) 76'; Lajami (yellow card) 83'	Report	Petratos 10'; Anselmo (yellow card) 38'; Al-Khulaif 39', (yellow card) 56'; Al-Eisa 87'; Al-Qarni (yellow card) 90'	Stadium: Prince Abdullah bin Jalawi Stadium; Attendance: 0 Referee: Majed Al-Shamrani

20 May 2021 28	Al-Wehda	1–1	Damac	Mecca
19:30	Anselmo (yellow card) 44'; Hernâni 47'; Pedrão (yellow card) 54'; Al-Owaishir (yellow card) 63'	Report	Antolić 45' (pen.), (yellow card) 49'; Munshi (yellow card) 59'; Chafaï (yellow card) 90+1'	Stadium: King Abdul Aziz Stadium; Attendance: 603; Referee: Faisal Al-Blwi

25 May 2021 29	Al-Wehda	1–1	Al-Nassr	Mecca
21:00	Al-Jayzani (yellow card) 20'; Luisinho (yellow card) 30'; Petratos 45+2' (pen.); Bakshween (yellow card) 55'; Anselmo (yellow card) 81'; Al-Eisa (yellow card) 88'; Botía (red card) 90+4'; Al-Zubaidi (yellow card) 90+7'	Report	Abdullah (yellow card) 45'; Hamdallah (yellow card) 45+1', (goal) 90' (pen.); Al-Obaid (yellow card) 82'	Stadium: King Abdul Aziz Stadium; Attendance: 2,596; Referee: Abdullah Al-Harbi

30 May 2021 30	Al-Shabab	3–0	Al-Wehda	Riyadh
21:00	Martins 7'; Lichnovsky (yellow card) 45+3'; Ighalo 54', 90'	Report	Al-Hafith (yellow card) 31'; Niakaté (yellow card) 39'; Bakshween (yellow card) 57'	Stadium: Prince Khalid bin Sultan Stadium; Attendance: 883; Referee: Majed Al-Shammari

=== King Cup ===
All times are local, AST (UTC+3).

17 December 2020 Round of 16	Al-Wehda	0–3	Al-Ittihad	Mecca
20:20	Al-Khulaif (yellow card) 27'; Al-Eisa (yellow card) 76'	Report	Prijović 48' (pen.), 49'; Pedrão 71' (o.g.)	Stadium: King Abdul Aziz Stadium; Attendance: 0 Referee: Khaled Al-Teris

=== AFC Champions League ===
==== Play-off Round ====
7 April 2021 Play-off round	Al-Wehda (Saudi Arabia)	1–1 (a.e.t.) (2–3 p)	(Iraq) Al-Quwa Al-Jawiya	Mecca, Saudi Arabia
20:45 AST	Niakaté 24'	Report	Haddad (yellow card) 34'; Hussein (yellow card) 61', (goal) 90+2'; El Ani (yellow card) 89'; Jabar (yellow card) 95'	Stadium: King Abdul Aziz Stadium; Attendance: 0 Referee: Omar Al-Yaqoubi (Oman)
	Penalties
	Niakaté (penalty scored); Al-Qarni (penalty missed); A. Al-Qahtani (penalty missed); M. Al-Qahtani (penalty scored); Al-Ghamdi (penalty missed)		(penalty missed) Jabbar; (penalty scored) Radhi; (penalty scored) Jabar; (penalty scored) Al Ani

== Statistics ==
=== Appearances ===
Last updated on 30 May 2021.

No.	Pos	Nat	Player	Total		Pro League		King Cup		Champions League	
No.	Pos	Nat	Player	Apps	Goals	Apps	Goals	Apps	Goals	Apps	Goals
Goalkeepers
1	GK	(Saudi Arabia) KSA	Raghid Al-Najjar	3	0	3	0	0	0	0	0
26	GK	(Saudi Arabia) KSA	Abdullah Al-Owaishir	29	0	27	0	1	0	1	0
66	GK	(Saudi Arabia) KSA	Basem Atallah	0	0	0	0	0	0	0	0
Defenders
2	DF	(Saudi Arabia) KSA	Mohammed Al-Amri	9	0	7+2	0	0	0	0	0
5	DF	(Brazil) BRA	Pedro Henrique	18	0	16+1	0	0+1	0	0	0
6	DF	(Saudi Arabia) KSA	Abdullah Al-Hafith	23	0	22	0	0	0	1	0
14	DF	(Spain) ESP	Alberto Botía	20	0	19	0	1	0	0	0
17	DF	(Saudi Arabia) KSA	Ali Al-Zubaidi	10	0	8+1	0	0	0	1	0
23	DF	(Saudi Arabia) KSA	Noor Al-Rashidi	8	0	3+3	0	1	0	1	0
25	DF	(Saudi Arabia) KSA	Sulaiman Hazazi	10	0	9	0	0	0	1	0
28	DF	(Saudi Arabia) KSA	Hamad Al-Jayzani	26	0	22+3	0	1	0	0	0
33	DF	(Saudi Arabia) KSA	Rakan Al-Harbi	3	0	2+1	0	0	0	0	0
38	DF	(Saudi Arabia) KSA	Naif Kariri	14	0	12+1	0	1	0	0	0
Midfielders
3	MF	(Saudi Arabia) KSA	Hussain Al-Eisa	28	2	15+11	2	1	0	1	0
4	MF	(Saudi Arabia) KSA	Waleed Bakshween	26	0	23+1	0	1	0	1	0
7	MF	(Saudi Arabia) KSA	Mishari Al-Qahtani	2	0	0+1	0	0	0	0+1	0
8	MF	(Saudi Arabia) KSA	Mohammed Al-Qarni	19	0	11+6	0	0+1	0	0+1	0
9	MF	(Portugal) POR	Hernâni	28	5	20+7	5	0+1	0	0	0
10	MF	(Australia) AUS	Dimitri Petratos	30	9	18+10	9	1	0	1	0
12	MF	(Saudi Arabia) KSA	Abdulkareem Al-Qahtani	3	0	0+2	0	0	0	0+1	0
24	MF	(Saudi Arabia) KSA	Mubarak Al-Sqoor	2	0	1	0	0	0	0+1	0
43	MF	(Saudi Arabia) KSA	Islam Hawsawi	1	0	0	0	0	0	0+1	0
49	MF	(Saudi Arabia) KSA	Sultan Al-Sawadi	4	0	0+4	0	0	0	0	0
77	MF	(Saudi Arabia) KSA	Ayman Al-Khulaif	13	1	5+7	1	1	0	0	0
87	MF	(Brazil) BRA	Anselmo	28	4	26	4	1	0	1	0
88	MF	(Saudi Arabia) KSA	Alaa Al Hejji	18	0	13+4	0	0	0	1	0
90	MF	(Saudi Arabia) KSA	Hazzaa Al-Ghamdi	13	2	6+6	2	0	0	0+1	0
91	MF	(Brazil) BRA	Luisinho	20	1	12+8	1	0	0	0	0
Forwards
18	FW	(France) FRA	Youssouf Niakaté	24	12	21+2	11	0	0	1	1
19	FW	(Saudi Arabia) KSA	Thamer Al-Ali	3	0	0+2	0	0+1	0	0	0
20	FW	(Saudi Arabia) KSA	Jaber Asiri	6	0	1+3	0	0+2	0	0	0
71	FW	(Eritrea) ERI	Ahmed Abdu Jaber	25	4	8+16	4	1	0	0	0

=== Goalscorers ===
Rank	No.	Pos	Nat	Name	Pro League	King Cup	Champions League	Total
1	18	FW	(France)	Youssouf Niakaté	11	0	1	12
2	10	MF	(Australia)	Dimitri Petratos	9	0	0	9
3	9	MF	(Portugal)	Hernâni	5	0	0	5
4	71	FW	(Eritrea)	Ahmed Abdu Jaber	4	0	0	4
4	87	MF	(Brazil)	Anselmo	4	0	0	4
6	3	MF	(Saudi Arabia)	Hussain Al-Eisa	2	0	0	2
6	90	MF	(Saudi Arabia)	Hazzaa Al-Ghamdi	2	0	0	2
8	77	MF	(Saudi Arabia)	Ayman Al-Khulaif	1	0	0	1
8	91	MF	(Brazil)	Luisinho	1	0	0	1
Own goal					1	0	0	1
Total					40	0	1	41

Last Updated: 25 May 2021

=== Assists ===
Rank	No.	Pos	Nat	Name	Pro League	King Cup	Champions League	Total
1	3	MF	(Saudi Arabia)	Hussain Al-Eisa	5	0	0	5
2	18	FW	(France)	Youssouf Niakaté	4	0	0	4
3	88	MF	(Saudi Arabia)	Alaa Al Hejji	3	0	0	3
4	25	DF	(Saudi Arabia)	Sulaiman Hazazi	1	0	1	2
4	28	DF	(Saudi Arabia)	Hamad Al-Jayzani	2	0	0	2
4	71	FW	(Eritrea)	Ahmed Abdu Jaber	2	0	0	2
4	87	MF	(Brazil)	Anselmo	2	0	0	2
8	4	MF	(Saudi Arabia)	Waleed Bakshween	1	0	0	1
8	6	DF	(Saudi Arabia)	Abdullah Al-Hafith	1	0	0	1
8	8	MF	(Saudi Arabia)	Mohammed Al-Qarni	1	0	0	1
8	9	MF	(Portugal)	Hernâni	1	0	0	1
8	10	MF	(Australia)	Dimitri Petratos	1	0	0	1
8	17	DF	(Saudi Arabia)	Ali Al-Zubaidi	1	0	0	1
8	91	MF	(Brazil)	Luisinho	1	0	0	1
Total					26	0	1	27

Last Updated: 20 May 2021

=== Clean sheets ===
Rank	No.	Pos	Nat	Name	Pro League	King Cup	Champions League	Total
1	26	GK	(Saudi Arabia)	Abdullah Al-Owaishir	3	0	0	3
Total					3	0	0	3

Last Updated: 15 January 2021
