= 2025–26 Neom SC season =

Neom
2025–26 season
- President: Meshari Al-Motairi
- Manager: Christophe Galtier
- Stadium: King Khalid Sport City Stadium
- Pro League: 8th
- King's Cup: Round of 32
- Top goalscorer: League: Alexandre Lacazette (11); All: Alexandre Lacazette (12)

The 2025–26 season was Neom's 61st year in existence and their first ever season in the Pro League, following their promotion from the FDL in the previous season. The club participated in the Pro League and the King's Cup.

The season covered the period from 1 July 2025 to 30 June 2026.

== Players ==
=== Squad information ===
As of 11 August 2025

Note: Flags indicate national team as defined under FIFA eligibility rules; some limited exceptions apply. Players may hold more than one non-FIFA nationality.

No.	Pos.	Nation	Player
1	GK	KSA	Mustafa Malayekah
2	DF	KSA	Mohammed Al-Breik
3	DF	KSA	Fahad Al-Harbi
4	DF	KSA	Khalifah Al-Dawsari
6	MF	KSA	Abbas Al-Hassan
7	MF	KSA	Salman Al-Faraj
8	MF	MLI	Abdoulaye Doucouré
10	FW	ALG	Saïd Benrahma
11	FW	KSA	Hassan Al-Ali
13	GK	KSA	Mohanad Al-Shehri
15	MF	KSA	Abdulmalik Al-Oyayari
18	MF	KSA	Alaa Al-Hejji
20	FW	KSA	Thamer Al-Khaibari
22	MF	FRA	Saïmon Bouabré

No.	Pos.	Nation	Player
24	MF	KSA	Abdulaziz Noor
25	DF	KSA	Faris Abdi
26	DF	EGY	Ahmed Hegazi
27	DF	KSA	Islam Hawsawi
38	DF	KSA	Mohammed D. Al-Dossari
40	MF	KSA	Ali Al-Asmari
44	DF	FRA	Nathan Zézé
55	DF	KSA	Mohammed W. Al-Dossari
71	FW	KSA	Ahmed Abdu Jaber
72	MF	CIV	Amadou Koné
88	GK	KSA	Mohammed Al-Hakim
91	FW	FRA	Alexandre Lacazette
99	GK	POL	Marcin Bułka
—	DF	KSA	Osama Al-Khalaf

=== Out on loan ===
Note: Flags indicate national team as defined under FIFA eligibility rules; some limited exceptions apply. Players may hold more than one non-FIFA nationality.

No. / Pos. / Nation / Player; 16 / MF / KSA / Riyadh Sharahili (at Damac until 30 June 2026)	No. / Pos. / Nation / Player; — / FW / KSA / Muhannad Al-Saad (at Lausanne until 30 June 2026)

== Transfers and loans ==
=== Transfers in ===
Entry date	Position	No.	Player	From club	Fee	Ref.
30 June 2025	DF	8	(Saudi Arabia) Osama Al-Khalaf	(Saudi Arabia) Al-Orobah	End of loan	
30 June 2025	MF	24	(Saudi Arabia) Muhannad Al-Saad	(France) Dunkerque	End of loan	
1 July 2025	MF	10	(Algeria) Saïd Benrahma	(France) Lyon	$13,750,000 (Note: This was a conditional obligation to buy activated when Neom were promoted to the Saudi Pro League.)	
1 July 2025	MF	72	(Ivory Coast) Amadou Koné	(France) Reims	$15,280,000	
1 July 2025	FW	91	(France) Alexandre Lacazette	(France) Lyon	Free	
4 July 2025	DF	25	(Saudi Arabia) Faris Abdi	(Saudi Arabia) Al-Fayha	$4,000,000	
5 July 2025	GK	99	(Poland) Marcin Bułka	(France) Nice	$17,200,000	
17 July 2025	MF	18	(Saudi Arabia) Alaa Al-Hejji	(Saudi Arabia) Al-Wehda	$6,665,000	
18 July 2025	MF	24	(Sudan) Abdulaziz Noor	(Saudi Arabia) Al-Wehda	$6,665,000	
18 July 2025	FW	20	(Saudi Arabia) Thamer Al-Khaibari	(Saudi Arabia) Al-Ettifaq	$3,332,000	
19 July 2025	MF	–	(Saudi Arabia) Nawaf Al-Janahi	(Saudi Arabia) Al-Ettifaq	$1,332,000	
31 July 2025	DF	44	(France) Nathan Zézé	(France) Nantes	$23,187,000	
2 August 2025	MF	22	(France) Saïmon Bouabré	Monaco	$11,560,000	
10 August 2025	MF	8	(Mali) Abdoulaye Doucouré	(England) Everton	Free	
23 August 2025	MF	–	(Saudi Arabia) Nawaf Al-Bakhit	(Saudi Arabia) Al-Arabi	Free	
24 August 2025	MF	–	(Saudi Arabia) Anwar Sharahili	(Saudi Arabia) Al-Hazem	$267,000	
27 August 2025	DF	4	(Saudi Arabia) Khalifah Al-Dawsari	(Saudi Arabia) Al-Hilal	Undisclosed	
10 September 2025	GK	81	(Portugal) Luís Maximiano	(Spain) Almería	$7,000,000	
10 September 2025	GK	50	(Saudi Arabia) Raed Ozaybi	(Saudi Arabia) Al-Khaleej	Free	
10 September 2025	FW	19	(Uruguay) Luciano Rodríguez	(Brazil) Bahia	$23,420,000	
16 September 2025	MF	47	(Saudi Arabia) Younes Al-Shanqiti	(Saudi Arabia) Al-Ahli	$533,000	

=== Loans in ===
Start date	End date	Position	No.	Player	To club	Fee	Ref.
9 September 2025	End of season	DF	93	(Saudi Arabia) Awn Al-Saluli	(Saudi Arabia) Al-Taawoun	None	
13 January 2026	End of season	MF	95	(Saudi Arabia) Ayman Fallatah	(Saudi Arabia) Al-Ahli	None	

=== Transfers out ===
Exit date	Position	No.	Player	To club	Fee	Ref.
30 June 2025	MF	18	(Saudi Arabia) Ahmed Al-Ghamdi	(Saudi Arabia) Al-Ittihad	End of loan	
30 June 2025	MF	32	(Saudi Arabia) Abdullah Al-Zaid	(Saudi Arabia) Al-Hilal	End of loan	
30 June 2025	FW	17	(Brazil) Carlos	(Saudi Arabia) Al-Shabab	End of loan	
9 August 2025	FW	9	(Senegal) Mbaye Diagne	(Turkey) Amedspor	Free	
15 August 2025	DF	44	(Saudi Arabia) Fahad Al-Munaif	(Saudi Arabia) Al-Orobah	Free	
20 August 2025	MF	30	(Guinea-Bissau) Alfa Semedo	(Saudi Arabia) Al-Fayha	Free	
28 August 2025	MF	49	(Saudi Arabia) Sultan Al-Sawadi	(Saudi Arabia) Al-Arabi	Free	
18 September 2025	DF	3	(Saudi Arabia) Fahad Al-Harbi	(Saudi Arabia) Al-Jabalain	Free	
20 September 2025	DF	5	(Saudi Arabia) Fahad Al-Munaif	(Saudi Arabia) Al-Orobah	Free	

=== Loans out ===
Start date	End date	Position	No.	Player	To club	Fee	Ref.
26 July 2025	End of season	MF	24	(Saudi Arabia) Muhannad Al-Saad	(Switzerland) Lausanne-Sport	None	
2 September 2025	End of season	MF	16	(Saudi Arabia) Riyadh Sharahili	(Saudi Arabia) Damac	None	
10 September 2025	End of season	GK	33	(Saudi Arabia) Abdulrahman Dagriri	(Saudi Arabia) Al-Tai	None	
10 September 2025	End of season	DF	55	(Saudi Arabia) Mohammed Waleed	(Saudi Arabia) Al-Taawoun	None	
10 September 2025	End of season	DF	–	(Saudi Arabia) Osama Al-Khalaf	(Saudi Arabia) Al-Adalah	None	
25 September 2025	End of season	DF	38	(Saudi Arabia) Mohammed Dakhilallah	(Saudi Arabia) Al-Raed	None	
27 January 2026	End of season	MF	40	(Saudi Arabia) Ali Al-Asmari	(Saudi Arabia) Al-Shabab	None	

== Pre-season and friendlies ==
26 July 2025 Friendly	Neom (Saudi Arabia)	0–2	(Spain) Levante	San Pedro del Pinatar, Spain
19:00 CEST		Report	Cortés 75'; Fernández 87'	Stadium: Pinatar Arena

30 July 2025 Friendly	Neom (Saudi Arabia)	0–2	(Qatar) Al-Rayyan	Algorfa, Spain
10:00 CEST			Guedes 6'; Surag 21'	Stadium: La Finca Resort

2 August 2025 Friendly	Neom (Saudi Arabia)	0–0	(Spain) Cartagena	San Pedro del Pinatar, Spain
19:00 CEST		Report		Stadium: Pinatar Arena

8 August 2025 Friendly	Neom (Saudi Arabia)	1–1	(Spain) Valencia Mestalla	San Pedro del Pinatar, Spain
19:00 CEST	Lacazette 65'	Report	Boyko 87'	Stadium: Pinatar Arena

16 August 2025 Friendly	Neom (Saudi Arabia)	2–2	(Italy) Roma	Frosinone, Italy
17:00 CEST	Benrahma 26'; Abdi 38'	Report	Cristante 25'; Soulé 32'	Stadium: Stadio Benito Stirpe

== Competitions ==
=== Overview ===
Competition	Record							
Competition	Pld	W	D	L	GF	GA	GD	Win %
Pro League	34	12	9	13	43	48	−5	35.29
King's Cup	1	0	0	1	1	2	−1	0.00
Total	35	12	9	14	44	50	−6	34.29

Source: Competitions

=== Pro League ===
==== League table ====
Pos	Team	Pld	W	D	L	GF	GA	GD	Pts	Qualification or relegation
6	Al-Taawoun	34	15	8	11	59	46	+13	53	Qualification for AFC Champions League Two group stage (Note: Since the winners of the 2025–26 King's Cup, Al-Hilal, had already qualified for the Champions League Elite, the spot given to the King's Cup winners (Champions League Two) was passed to the sixth-placed team.)
7	Al-Ettifaq	34	14	8	12	51	55	−4	50	Qualification for AGCFF Gulf Club Champions League group stage
8	Neom	34	12	9	13	43	48	−5	45	Qualification for AGCFF Gulf Club Champions League group stage
9	Al-Hazem	34	11	9	14	38	57	−19	42	
10	Al-Fayha	34	10	8	16	41	54	−13	38	

Source: SPL
Rules for classification: 1) Points; 2) Head-to-head points; 3) Head-to-head goal difference; 4) Total goal difference; 5) Total goals scored; 6) Fair-play points
(Note: Head-to-head record is used only after all the matches between the teams in question have been played).

==== Results summary ====
Overall								Home						Away					
Pld	W	D	L	GF	GA	GD	Pts	W	D	L	GF	GA	GD	W	D	L	GF	GA	GD
34	12	9	13	43	48	−5	45	6	4	7	20	24	−4	6	5	6	23	24	−1

Source: Saudi Pro League

==== Results by round ====
Round	1	2	3	4	5	6	7	8	9	11	12	13	14	15	16	17	18	19	20	21	22	23	10	24	25	26	27	28	29	30	31	32	33	34
Ground	A	A	H	A	H	H	A	H	A	H	H	A	H	A	H	A	H	H	A	H	A	A	A	H	A	H	H	A	A	H	A	H	A	H
Result	L	W	W	W	L	D	W	L	D	W	L	W	L	L	L	D	L	W																
Position	13	8	5	4	9	8	6	7	8	7	7	7	8	9	10	9	9	9																

Updated to match(es) played on 30 January 2026. Source: Saudi Pro League
A = Away; H = Home; W = Win; D = Draw; L = Loss

==== Matches ====
All times are local, AST (UTC+3).

Win Draw Loss Postponed

28 August 2025 1	Al-Ahli	1–0	Neom	Jeddah
21:00	Toney 23'; Al-Muwallad (yellow card) 90+5'	Report	Al-Oyayari (yellow card) 45+3'; Hegazi (yellow card) 51'; Al-Hassan (yellow card) 90+7'	Stadium: Alinma Stadium; Attendance: 40,438; Referee: Jesús Valenzuela (Venezuela)

14 September 2025 2	Damac	1–2	Neom	Khamis Mushait
18:50	Medina 49'; Méïté (yellow card) 63'; Harkass (yellow card) 83'	Report	Lacazette 30', 83' (pen.); Noor (yellow card) 90+3'	Stadium: Damac Club Stadium; Attendance: 2,015; Referee: Abdullah Al-Kharbosh

18 September 2025 3	Neom	1–0	Al-Okhdood	Tabuk
21:00	Al-Oyayari 28', (yellow card) 88'; Doucouré (yellow card) 51'	Report	Kramer (yellow card) 20'; Al-Salem (yellow card) 26'; Pedroza (yellow card) 82' (yellow-red card) 90+3'	Stadium: King Khalid Sport City Stadium; Attendance: 2,497; Referee: Shukri Al-Hanfoush

27 September 2025 4	Al-Riyadh	2–3	Neom	Riyadh
18:20	Al-Absi 19'; Sylla (yellow card) 21'; Okou (yellow card) 63'; Doucouré 77' (o.g.)	Report	Rodríguez 2'; Hegazi (yellow card) 21', (goal) 28'; Abdi (yellow card) 38'; Lacazette 54'	Stadium: SHG Arena; Attendance: 1,038; Referee: Fraih Al-Jaloud

19 October 2025 5	Neom	1–3	Al-Qadsiah	Tabuk
21:00	Hegazi (yellow card) 31'; Lacazette (yellow card) 34', (goal) 66'; Al-Hassan (yellow card) 86'; Zézé (yellow card) 90'; Al-Oyayari (yellow card) 90+5'	Report	Quiñones 11', 45', 88'; Nacho (yellow card) 29'; Otávio (yellow card) 45+3'	Stadium: King Khalid Sport City Stadium; Attendance: 6,576; Referee: Tamás Bognár (Hungary)

24 October 2025 6	Neom	1–1	Al-Khaleej	Tabuk
18:30	Zézé (yellow card) 15'; Lacazette (yellow card) 22'; Rodríguez 34'; Hegazi (yellow card) 75'	Report	Al-Amri 16'; Hawsawi (yellow card) 78'	Stadium: King Khalid Sport City Stadium; Attendance: 2,169; Referee: Khaled Al-Ahmari

30 October 2025 7	Al-Kholood	2–3	Neom	Buraidah
20:30	N'Doram 5'; Al-Safri (yellow card) 15'; Maolida (yellow card) 27'; Enrique 82'; Al-Shehri (yellow card) 90+1'	Report	Benrahma 8', 66'; Troost-Ekong 32' (o.g.); Koné (yellow card) 35'; Al-Oyayari (yellow card) 77'; Maximiano (yellow card) 78'	Stadium: King Abdullah Sports City; Attendance: 981; Referee: Abdulsamad Bakri

8 November 2025 8	Neom	1–3	Al-Nassr	Tabuk
16:50	Doucouré (yellow card) 6'; Rodríguez (red card) 56'; Zézé (yellow card) 72'; Abdu Jaber 84'	Report	Ângelo (yellow card) 30', (goal) 47'; Ronaldo 65' (pen.); Al-Ghannam (yellow card) 73'; Félix 86'	Stadium: King Khalid Sport City Stadium; Attendance: 7,652; Referee: Abdullah Al-Shehri

23 November 2025 9	Al-Taawoun	1–1	Neom	Buraidah
20:30	El Mahdioui (yellow card) 39'; Al-Ahmed (yellow card) 72', (goal) 90+17'; Girotto (yellow card) 90+3'; Al-Alaeli (yellow card) 90+19'	Report	Doucouré (yellow card) 33'; Abdi (yellow card) 87'; Benrahma 90+5' (pen.); Noor (yellow card) 90+9'	Stadium: Al-Taawoun Club Stadium; Attendance: 5,050; Referee: Khaled Al-Ahmari

25 December 2025 11	Neom	2–1	Al-Najma	Tabuk
20:30	Abdi (yellow card) 51'; Zézé 54'; Al-Dawsari 89'	Report	Al-Tulayhi (yellow card) 11'; Flores (yellow card) 77'; Boutobba 90+5' (pen.); K. Al-Shammari (yellow card) 90+6'	Stadium: King Khalid Sport City Stadium; Attendance: 965; Referee: Majed Al-Shamrani

31 December 2025 12	Neom	1–3	Al-Ittihad	Tabuk
18:25	Koné (yellow card) 25'; Benrahma 27'	Report	Fernandes 14'; Bergwijn 68'; A. Al-Ghamdi 90+6'	Stadium: King Khalid Sport City Stadium; Attendance: 7,052; Referee: Khalid Al-Turais

4 January 2026 13	Al-Hazem	1–2	Neom	Ar Rass
18:05	Sayoud 90+5' (pen.)	Report	Al-Asmari (yellow card) 31'; Lacazette 59'; Rodríguez 88'	Stadium: Al-Hazem Club Stadium; Attendance: 1,044; Referee: Khaled Al-Ahmari

10 January 2026 14	Neom	0–1	Al-Fateh	Tabuk
17:00	Benrahma (yellow card) 71'	Report	Al-Suwailem (yellow card) 5'; Masoud 36'; Delgado (yellow card) 56'; Batna (yellow card) 81'; Al-Fawaz (yellow card) 90+2'	Stadium: King Khalid Sport City Stadium; Attendance: 1,579; Referee: Abdullah Al-Owaydan

14 January 2026 15	Al-Shabab	3–2	Neom	Riyadh
20:30	Al-Hammami 4'; Carrasco 57' (pen.), 61'; Hernández (yellow card) 87'; Adli (yellow card) 87'	Report	Bouabré 6', (yellow card) 40'; Benrahma 49'; Zézé (yellow card) 56'	Stadium: Al-Awwal Park; Attendance: 2,901; Referee: Shukri Al-Hanfoush

18 January 2026 16	Neom	1–2	Al-Hilal	Tabuk
20:30	Al-Breik 42'; Abdi (yellow card) 65'	Report	Milinković-Savić (yellow card) 44'; Al-Tambakti 49'; Marí (yellow card) 61'; Neves 66' (pen.)	Stadium: King Khalid Sport City Stadium; Attendance: 7,491; Referee: Javier Alberola Rojas (Spain)

21 January 2026 17	Al-Ettifaq	0–0	Neom	Dammam
20:30	Hendry (yellow card) 74'; Medrán (yellow card) 88'; Calvo (yellow card) 90+1'	Report	Al-Dawsari (yellow card) 90+5'	Stadium: EGO Stadium; Attendance: 3,194; Referee: Ahmed Al-Rumaikhani

24 January 2026 18	Neom	0–3	Al-Ahli	Tabuk
20:30	Zézé (yellow card) 41'; Al-Dawsari (red card) 61'; Al-Faraj (yellow card) 68'	Report	Kessié (yellow card) 45+1'; Toney 55' (pen.); Mahrez 64'; Millot 67'; Hawsawi (yellow card) 82'; Majrashi (yellow card) 89'	Stadium: King Khalid Sport City Stadium; Attendance: 6,967; Referee: Mohammed Al-Ismail

30 January 2026 19	Neom	3–0	Damac	Tabuk
20:30	Zézé 23'; Lacazette 45+1' (pen.); Abdi (yellow card) 78'; Koné (yellow card) 86', (goal) 90+1'	Report	Al-Obaid (yellow card) 9'; Harkass (yellow card) 30'; Sylla (yellow card) 47'	Stadium: King Khalid Sport City Stadium; Attendance: 1,700; Referee: Mohammed Al-Hoaish

21 December 2025 10	Al-Fayha	v	Neom	Al Majma'ah
17:50				Stadium: Al-Majma'ah Sports City Stadium

=== King's Cup ===
All times are local, AST (UTC+3).

23 September 2025 Round of 32	Al-Hazem	2–1	Neom	Ar Rass
18:35	Al Somah 5', 62', (yellow card) 82'; Al-Harbi (yellow card) 47'	Report	Lacazette 26'; Al-Breik (yellow card) 59'	Stadium: Al-Hazem Club Stadium; Referee: Mamdouh Al Shahdan

== Statistics ==
=== Appearances ===
Last updated on 30 January 2026.

No.	Pos	Nat	Player	Total		Pro League		King's Cup	
No.	Pos	Nat	Player	Apps	Goals	Apps	Goals	Apps	Goals
Goalkeepers
1	GK	(Saudi Arabia) KSA	Mustafa Malayekah	0	0	0	0	0	0
50	GK	(Saudi Arabia) KSA	Raed Ozaybi	0	0	0	0	0	0
81	GK	(Portugal) POR	Luís Maximiano	18	0	17	0	1	0
88	GK	(Saudi Arabia) KSA	Mohammed Al-Hakeem	0	0	0	0	0	0
99	GK	(Poland) POL	Marcin Bułka	1	0	1	0	0	0
Defenders
2	DF	(Saudi Arabia) KSA	Mohammed Al-Breik	9	1	4+4	1	1	0
4	DF	(Saudi Arabia) KSA	Khalifah Al-Dawsari	13	1	12+1	1	0	0
15	DF	(Saudi Arabia) KSA	Abdulmalik Al-Oyayari	9	1	8	1	0+1	0
25	DF	(Saudi Arabia) KSA	Faris Abdi	18	0	17	0	1	0
26	DF	(Egypt) EGY	Ahmed Hegazi	16	1	15	1	1	0
27	DF	(Saudi Arabia) KSA	Islam Hawsawi	8	0	1+7	0	0	0
44	DF	(France) FRA	Nathan Zézé	17	2	16	2	1	0
48	DF	(Saudi Arabia) KSA	Ali Al-Nakhli	0	0	0	0	0	0
59	DF	(Saudi Arabia) KSA	Abdulaziz Al-Khanani	0	0	0	0	0	0
93	DF	(Saudi Arabia) KSA	Awn Al-Saluli	5	0	1+4	0	0	0
Midfielders
6	MF	(Saudi Arabia) KSA	Abbas Al-Hassan	8	0	4+4	0	0	0
7	MF	(Saudi Arabia) KSA	Salman Al-Faraj	8	0	3+5	0	0	0
8	MF	(Mali) MLI	Abdoulaye Doucouré	7	0	6	0	1	0
10	MF	(Algeria) ALG	Saïd Benrahma	17	5	13+3	5	1	0
18	MF	(Saudi Arabia) KSA	Alaa Al-Hejji	9	0	3+6	0	0	0
22	MF	(France) FRA	Saïmon Bouabré	16	1	13+2	1	0+1	0
24	MF	(Saudi Arabia) KSA	Abdulaziz Noor	10	0	3+6	0	1	0
47	MF	(Saudi Arabia) KSA	Younes Al-Shanqeeti	0	0	0	0	0	0
57	MF	(Colombia) COL	Geovanny Balanta	0	0	0	0	0	0
72	MF	(Ivory Coast) CIV	Amadou Koné	18	1	17	1	0+1	0
95	MF	(Saudi Arabia) KSA	Ayman Fallatah	1	0	0+1	0	0	0
Forwards
11	FW	(Saudi Arabia) KSA	Hassan Al-Ali	12	0	4+7	0	0+1	0
19	FW	(Uruguay) URU	Luciano Rodríguez	16	3	14+1	3	1	0
20	FW	(Saudi Arabia) KSA	Thamer Al-Khaibari	3	0	0+3	0	0	0
71	FW	(Saudi Arabia) KSA	Ahmed Abdu Jaber	12	1	2+9	1	0+1	0
91	FW	(France) FRA	Alexandre Lacazette	19	7	17+1	6	1	1
Players sent out on loan this season
38	DF	(Saudi Arabia) KSA	Mohammed Dakhilallah	0	0	0	0	0	0
40	MF	(Saudi Arabia) KSA	Ali Al-Asmari	15	0	6+8	0	1	0
55	DF	(Saudi Arabia) KSA	Mohammed Waleed	1	0	1	0	0	0

=== Goalscorers ===
Rank	No.	Pos	Nat	Name	Pro League	King's Cup	Total
1	91	FW	(France)	Alexandre Lacazette	6	1	7
2	10	MF	(Algeria)	Saïd Benrahma	5	0	5
3	19	FW	(Uruguay)	Luciano Rodríguez	3	0	3
4	44	DF	(France)	Nathan Zézé	2	0	2
5	2	DF	(Saudi Arabia)	Mohammed Al-Breik	1	0	1
5	4	DF	(Saudi Arabia)	Khalifah Al-Dawsari	1	0	1
5	15	DF	(Saudi Arabia)	Abdulmalik Al-Oyayari	1	0	1
5	22	MF	(France)	Saïmon Bouabré	1	0	1
5	26	DF	(Egypt)	Ahmed Hegazi	1	0	1
5	71	FW	(Saudi Arabia)	Ahmed Abdu Jaber	1	0	1
5	72	MF	(Ivory Coast)	Amadou Koné	1	0	1
Own goal					1	0	1
Total					24	1	25

Last Updated: 30 January 2026

=== Assists ===
Rank	No.	Pos	Nat	Name	Pro League	King's Cup	Total
1	91	FW	(France)	Alexandre Lacazette	4	0	4
2	10	MF	(Algeria)	Saïd Benrahma	3	0	3
3	19	FW	(Uruguay)	Luciano Rodríguez	1	1	2
3	22	MF	(France)	Saïmon Bouabré	2	0	2
5	8	MF	(Mali)	Abdoulaye Doucouré	1	0	1
5	18	MF	(Saudi Arabia)	Alaa Al-Hejji	1	0	1
5	25	DF	(Saudi Arabia)	Faris Abdi	1	0	1
5	27	DF	(Saudi Arabia)	Islam Hawsawi	1	0	1
5	44	DF	(France)	Nathan Zézé	1	0	1
Total					15	1	16

Last Updated: 30 January 2026

=== Clean sheets ===
Rank	No.	Pos	Nat	Name	Pro League	King Cup	Total
1	81	GK	(Portugal)	Luís Maximiano	3	0	3
Total					3	0	3

Last Updated: 30 January 2026
