= Faisel Masrahi =

Saudi Arabian footballer

Personal information
- Full name: Faisel Mohammed Masrahi
- Date of birth: January 24, 1993 (age 33)
- Place of birth: Khobar, Saudi Arabia
- Height: 1.82 m (5 ft 11 1/2 in)
- Position: Goalkeeper

Youth career
- Al-Qadsiah

Senior career*
Years	Team	Apps	(Gls)
2013–2022	Al-Qadsiah	148	(0)
2022–2023	Al-Fayha	0	(0)

International career^{‡}
2013–2016	Saudi Arabia U-23		
- * Club domestic league appearances and goals as of 19:27, 20 September 2020 (UTC) ‡ National team caps and goals as of 02:27, 28 January 2016 (UTC)

Faisel Masrahi (Arabic: فيصل مسرحي, born 24 January 1993) is a Saudi Arabian football player who plays as a goalkeeper.
