= Talal Hawsawi =

Saudi Arabian footballer

Personal information
- Full name: Talal Yahya Eissa Hawsawi
- Date of birth: 29 August 1998 (age 28)
- Place of birth: Jeddah, Saudi Arabia
- Position: Defender

Team information
- Current team: Wej
- Number: 14

Youth career
- –2018: Al-Ahli

Senior career*
Years	Team	Apps	(Gls)
2018–2020	Najran	40	(0)
2020–2023	Al-Qadsiah	2	(0)
2021–2022	→ Al-Kholood (loan)	30	(0)
2023	Al-Shoulla	13	(0)
2023–2024	Najran		
2024–2025	Arar		
2025–	Wej		

International career
2014	Saudi Arabia U17		
- * Club domestic league appearances and goals as of 31 May 2021

Talal Hawsawi (Arabic: طلال هوساوي; born 29 August 1998) is a Saudi Arabian footballer who plays as a defender for Wej.

== Career ==
Hawsawi started his career at the youth teams of Al-Ahli. He left the club in July 2018 without making an appearance for the senior team. On 24 August 2018, Hawsawi joined MS League side Najran. On 19 July 2019, he renewed his contract for another year. On 26 October 2020, Hawsawi joined Pro League side Al-Qadsiah. On 21 August 2021, Hawsawi joined MS League side on loan until the end of the season. On 31 January 2023, Hawsawi was released by Al-Qadsiah. On the same day, Hawsawi joined Al-Shoulla. On 12 September 2023, Hawsawi joined Najran. On 14 September 2024, Hawsawi joined Arar.
