= Khalifah Al-Dawsari =

Saudi Arabian footballer

Personal information
- Full name: Khalifah Adel Al-Dawsari
- Date of birth: 2 January 1999 (age 27)
- Place of birth: Khobar, Saudi Arabia
- Height: 1.80 m (5 ft 11 in)
- Position: Centre-back

Team information
- Current team: Neom
- Number: 4

Youth career
- Al-Qadsiah

Senior career*
Years	Team	Apps	(Gls)
2018–2021	Al-Qadsiah	56	(1)
2021–2025	Al-Hilal	26	(0)
2022	→ Al-Fateh (loan)	6	(0)
2025–	Neom	37	(1)

International career^{‡}
2017–2019	Saudi Arabia U20	20	(0)
2019–2022	Saudi Arabia U23	27	(0)
2021–	Saudi Arabia	2	(0)
- * Club domestic league appearances and goals as of November 5, 2026 ‡ National team caps and goals as of March 31, 2026

Khalifah Adel Al-Dawsari (Arabic: خَلِيفَة عَادِل الدَّوْسَرِيّ; born 2 January 1999) is a Saudi Arabian professional footballer who plays as a centre-back for Saudi Pro League club Neom and the Saudi Arabia national team.

== Club career ==
Al-Dawsari started his career in the youth teams of Al-Qadsiah. He was first called up to the first team on 12 April 2018 during the match against Al-Nassr, where he was an unused substitute. On 28 May 2018, he signed his first professional contract with the club. On 29 August 2019, Al-Dawsari renewed his contract with Al-Qadsiah until 2024.

On 7 August 2021, Al-Dawsari joined Al-Hilal on a five-year contract. On 30 January 2022, Al-Dawsari joined Al-Fateh on loan.

On 27 August 2025, Al-Dawsari joined newly-promoted Pro League side Neom.

== Career statistics ==
=== Club ===
As of match played 31 May 2025

Club	Season	League		King Cup		Asia		Other		Total	
Club	Season	Apps	Goals	Apps	Goals	Apps	Goals	Apps	Goals	Apps	Goals
Al-Qadsiah	2018–19	0	0	0	0	—		—		0	0
Al-Qadsiah	2019–20	29	0	0	0	—		—		29	0
Al-Qadsiah	2020–21	27	1	2	0	—		—		29	1
Al-Qadsiah	Total	56	1	2	0	0	0	0	0	58	1
Al-Hilal	2021–22	2	0	0	0	0	0	0	0	2	0
Al-Hilal	2022–23	11	0	2	0	2	0	2 (Note: Appearances in FIFA Club World Cup)	0	17	0
Al-Hilal	2023–24	4	0	0	0	2	0	0	0	6	0
Al-Hilal	2024–25	9	0	0	0	3	0	1 (Note: Appearance(s) in Saudi Super Cup)	0	13	0
Al-Hilal	Total	26	0	2	0	7	0	3	0	38	0
Al-Fateh (loan)	2021–22	6	0	0	0	0	0	0	0	6	0
Neom	2025–26	0	0	0	0	—		—		0	0
Career totals		88	1	4	0	7	0	3	0	102	1

== Honours ==
Al-Hilal

- Saudi Professional League: 2023–24
- King Cup: 2022–23, 2023–24
- Saudi Super Cup: 2021, 2023, 2024
- AFC Champions League: 2021

Saudi Arabia U20

- AFC U-19 Championship: 2018

Saudi Arabia U23

- AFC U-23 Asian Cup: 2022
