= Faris Abdi =

Footballer (born 1999)

Personal information
- Full name: Faris Rifat Abdi
- Date of birth: 9 May 1999 (age 27)
- Place of birth: San Diego, California, U.S.
- Height: 1.80 m (5 ft 11 in)
- Positions: Midfielder; left-back

Team information
- Current team: Al-Ittihad
- Number: 25

Youth career
- 2013–2017: IMG Academy
- 2018: Lausanne-Sport

College career
Years	Team	Apps	(Gls)
2017	Virginia Cavaliers	11	(1)

Senior career*
Years	Team	Apps	(Gls)
2018	Team Vaud M-21	3	(0)
2019	Austin Bold	7	(1)
2020	Al-Wehda	2	(0)
2020–2024	Al-Qadsiah	59	(0)
2024–2025	Al-Fayha	31	(1)
2025–2026	Neom	30	(0)
2026–	Al-Ittihad	11	(0)

International career^{‡}
2017	United States U18	2	(2)
2017–2020	Saudi Arabia U23		
2017–	Saudi Arabia	3	(0)
- * Club domestic league appearances and goals as of 16:05, 30 October 2026 (UTC) ‡ National team caps and goals as of 17 November 2026

Faris Abdi (Arabic: فارس عابدي; born 9 May 1999), is a professional footballer. Born in the United States, he played for Al-Ittihad and the Saudi Arabia national team.

== Early life ==
Faris Abdi was born on May 9, 1999, in San Diego, California and is the son of Rifat Abdi and Soulafa Al Nassar. Abdi was raised in Dhahran, Eastern Province, Saudi Arabia. Abdi went to high school at IMG Academy and there continued to play soccer. As a senior Abdi won the award of the MVP of his team and best attacking player.

== Club career ==
On 5 July 2024, Abdi joined Saudi Pro League side Al-Fayha on a three-year deal.

On 4 July 2025, Abdi joined newly promoted Pro League side Neom.

== International career ==
Having scored two goals in two games for the United States under-18 side in June 2017, Abdi was called up to the Saudi Arabia national team side for friendlies against Jamaica and Ghana in late 2017. He made his debut against Jamaica, coming on as a 71st-minute substitute for Salem Al-Dawsari.

== Career statistics ==
=== Club ===
As of 30 May 2025.

Club	Season	League			Cup		Other		Total	
Club	Season	Division	Apps	Goals	Apps	Goals	Apps	Goals	Apps	Goals
Team Vaud M-21	2017–18	Swiss 1. Liga	3	0	0	0	0	0	3	0
Austin Bold	2019	USL Championship	7	1	2 (Note: Appearances in the U.S. Open Cup)	0	0	0	9	1
Al-Wehda	2019–20	SPL	2	0	0	0	—		2	0
Al-Qadsiah	2020–21	SPL	10	0	0	0	—		10	0
Al-Qadsiah	2021–22	FDL	7	0	—		—		7	0
Al-Qadsiah	2022–23	FDL	19	0	—		—		19	0
Al-Qadsiah	2023–24	FDL	23	0	0	0	—		23	0
Al-Qadsiah	Total		59	0	0	0	0	0	59	0
Al-Fayha	2024–25	SPL	31	1	2	0	—		33	1
Neom	2025–26	SPL	0	0	0	0	—		0	0
Career total			102	2	4	0	0	0	106	2

=== International ===
As of matches played 17 November 2026.

National team	Year	Apps	Goals
Saudi Arabia	2017	1	0
2026	2	0	
Total		3	0

== Honours ==
Al-Qadsiah

- First Division League: 2023–24
