= King Khalid Sports City Stadium =

Football stadium in Tabuk, Saudi Arabia

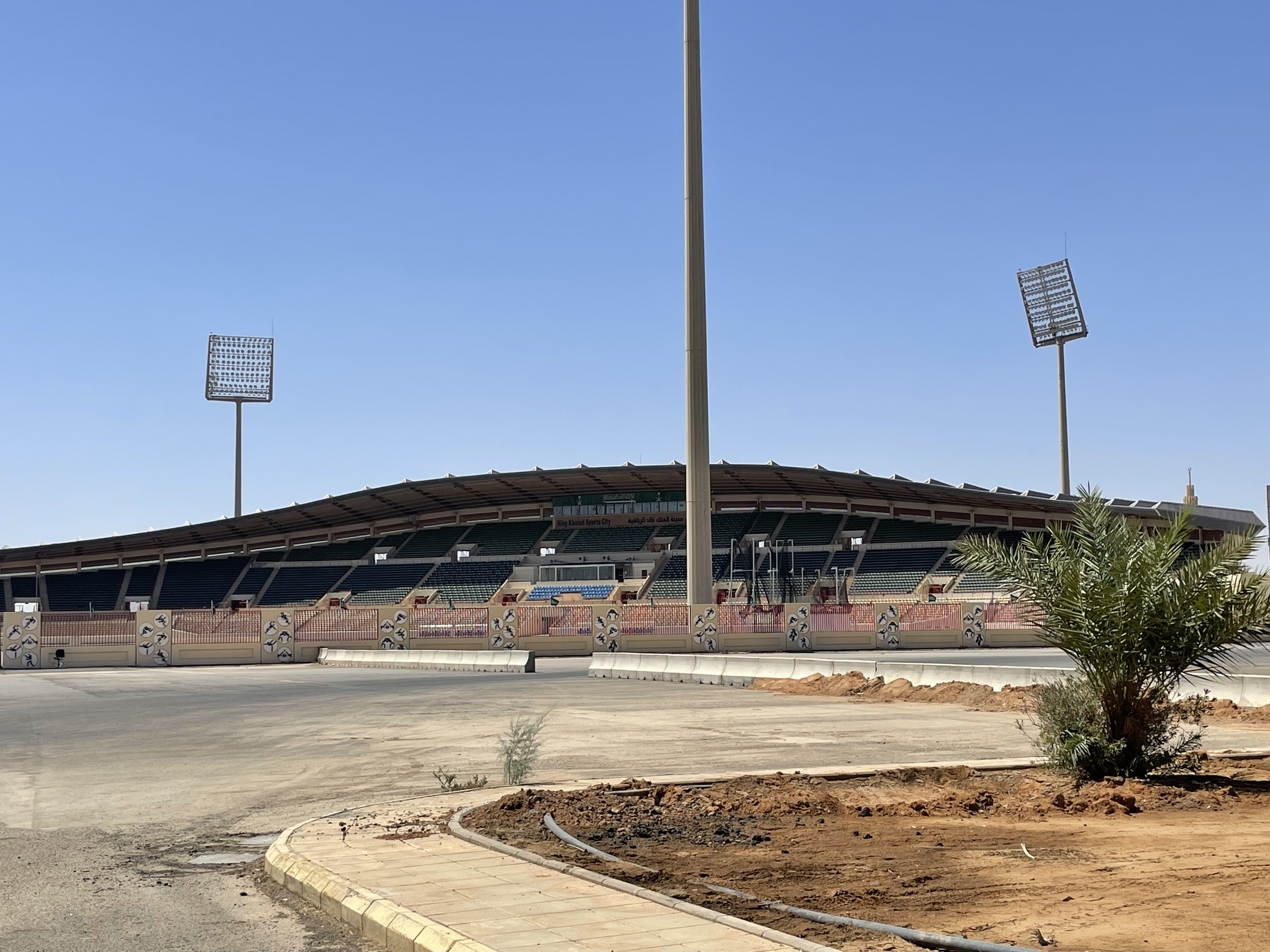
- Interactive map of King Khalid Sports City Stadium
- Full name: King Khalid Sports City Stadium
- Location: Tabuk, Saudi Arabia
- Coordinates: 28.479603°N 36.488741°E
- Owner: Ministry of Sport
- Capacity: 12,000
- Surface: Grass

Construction
- Opened: 1987

Tenant
- Neom (2023–present)

The King Khalid Sports City Stadium, previously known as the King Khalid Sport City Stadium, is a football stadium in Tabuk, Saudi Arabia. It is used mainly for football. The stadium has a seating capacity of 12,000 spectators.

== See also ==
- List of things named after Saudi kings
- List of football stadiums in Saudi Arabia
