= Adel Al-Muwallad =

Saudi Arabian footballer

Personal information
- Full name: Adel Amin Al-Muwallad
- Date of birth: 1 April 1997 (age 29)
- Place of birth: Medina, Saudi Arabia
- Height: 1.76 m (5 ft 9 in)
- Position: Centre-back

Youth career
- –2015: Al-Ansar
- 2015–2018: Al-Hilal

Senior career*
Years	Team	Apps	(Gls)
2018–2019	Al-Jabalain	19	(0)
2019–2021	Al-Qadsiah	15	(0)

International career
2015–2016	Saudi Arabia U20		
- * Club domestic league appearances and goals as of May 30, 2021

Adel Al-Muwallad (Arabic: عادل المولد; born 1 April 1997) is a Saudi Arabian football player who plays as a defender.

== Career ==
Al-Muwallad started his career with Medina based club Al-Ansar. He was called up by the Saudi Arabia under-20 national team for the first team in 2015. On 16 November 2015, Al-Muwallad left Al-Ansar and joined Al-Hilal. On 26 August 2018, Al-Muwallad left Al-Hilal and MS League side Al-Jabalain. After making 19 appearances for the club, Al-Muwallad left a season later. On 26 July 2019, Al-Muwallad joined Al-Qadsiah.

== Career statistics ==
=== Club ===
As of 30 May 2021.

Club	Season	League			Cup		Continental		Other		Total	
Club	Season	Division	Apps	Goals	Apps	Goals	Apps	Goals	Apps	Goals	Apps	Goals
Al-Hilal	2017–18	Pro League	0	0	0	0	0	0	3 (Note: Appearances in Arab Club Championship)	0	3	0
Al-Jabalain	2018–19	MS League	19	0	0	0	–		–		19	0
Al-Qadsiah	2019–20	MS League	12	0	1	0	–		–		13	0
Al-Qadsiah	2020–21	Pro League	3	0	0	0	–		–		3	0
Al-Qadsiah	Club total		15	0	1	0	0	0	0	0	16	0
Career total			34	0	1	0	0	0	3	0	38	0
