= 2005–06 Saudi Crown Prince Cup =

2005–06 Crown Prince Cup
Tournament details
- Country: Saudi Arabia
- Dates: 24 November 2005 – 7 April 2006
- Teams: 44 (all); 32 (qualifying competition); 16 (main competition)

Final positions
- Champions: Al-Hilal (6th title)
- Runners-up: Al-Ahli
- AFC Champions League: Al-Hilal

Tournament statistics
- Matches played: 17
- Goals scored: 57 (3.35 per match)
- Top goal scorer(s): Rogério (4 goals)
- All statistics correct as of 7 April 2006. (Note: All statistics do not include qualifying play-offs)

The 2005–06 Crown Prince Cup was the 31st season of the Saudi premier knockout tournament, established in 1957. The competition began with the qualifying rounds on 24 November 2005 and concluded with the final on 7 April 2006.

Al-Hilal were the defending champions and successfully defended their title, defeating Al-Ahli in the final on 7 April 2006 for the second consecutive win . As winners of the tournament, Al-Hilal qualified for the 2007 AFC Champions League group stage.

== Qualifying rounds ==
All of the competing teams not in the Premier League competed in the qualifying rounds to secure one of 4 available places in the Round of 16. The qualifying competition began on 24 November 2005. First Division sides Al-Faisaly and Al-Riyadh, Second Division side Al-Hamadah and Third Division side Al-Rawdhah qualified.

=== First round ===
Home team (tier)	Score	Away team (tier)
Thursday 24 November 2005
Al-Riyadh (2)	1–0	Al-Batin (4)
Al-Shoulla (2)	0–1	Sdoos (3)
Al-Najma (3)	1–4	Al-Faisaly (2)
Al-Raed (2)	3–1	Al-Fayha (2)
Al-Nahda (3)	0–0 (5–4 p)	Al-Fateh (2)
Ohod (2)	1–1 (6–5 p)	Al-Arabi (4)
Al-Hamadah (3)	2–1	Al-Taawoun (2)
Al-Jabalain (2)	2–2 (6–5 p)	Al-Qotah (3)
Najran (2)	3–1	Hetten (4)
Al-Watani (2)	1–0	Al-Majd (4)
Al-Orobah (3)	11–3	Al-Qala (4)
Damac (2)	1–2	Al-Nakhil (4)
Al-Rabe'e (3)	4–2	Wej (4)
Al-Khaleej (2)	2–0	Al-Adalah (3)
Hajer (2)	2–3	Al-Rawdhah (4)
Al-Tuhami (3)	2–1	Al-Akhdoud (3)

=== Second round ===
Home team (tier)	Score	Away team (tier)
Tuesday 29 November 2005
Al-Riyadh (2)	5–0	Sdoos (3)
Al-Nahda (3)	4–1	Al-Khaleej (2)
Al-Faisaly (2)	2–0	Al-Raed (2)
Ohod (2)	4–3	Al-Rabe'e (3)
Al-Hamadah (3)	2–1	Al-Orobah (3)
Al-Jabalain (2)	0–2	Al-Watani (2)
Najran (2)	3–1	Al-Tuhami (3)
Al-Rawdhah (4)	2–0	Al-Nakhil (4)

=== Final round ===
Home team (tier)	Score	Away team (tier)
Sunday 4 December 2005
Al-Riyadh (2)	3–0	Al-Nahda (3)
Al-Faisaly (2)	2–0	Al-Watani (2)
Ohod (2)	1–2	Al-Hamadah (3)
Al-Rawdhah (4)	3–3 (5–4 p)	Najran (2)

== Bracket ==
Round of 16
A	Al-Ittihad	1
H	Al-Riyadh	0
H	Al-Ahli	4
A	Abha	0
A	Al-Shabab (a.e.t.)	3
H	Al-Hazem	2
H	Al-Tai	3
A	Al-Hamadah	4
A	Al-Nassr	1
H	Al-Ettifaq	0
H	Al-Wehda	2
A	Al-Faisaly	1
H	Al-Hilal	1
A	Al-Ansar	0
A	Al-Qadisiyah	8
H	Al-Rawdhah	0

Quarter-finals
H	Al-Ittihad	1 (2)
A	Al-Ahli (pen.)	1 (4)
H	Al-Shabab	4
A	Al-Hamadah	1
A	Al-Nassr	0
H	Al-Wehda	1
A	Al-Hilal	2
H	Al-Qadisiyah	0

Semi-finals
A	Al-Ahli	2	3	5
H	Al-Shabab	1	3	4
A	Al-Wehda	2	0	2
H	Al-Hilal	3	2	5

Final
–	Al-Ahli	0
–	Al-Hilal	1

Source: Al Jazirah

== Round of 16 ==
The Round of 16 fixtures were played on 27 and 28 December 2005. All times are local, AST (UTC+3).

27 December 2005 1	Al-Riyadh (2)	0–1	Al-Ittihad (1)	Riyadh
19:35		Report	Job 74'	Stadium: Prince Faisal bin Fahd Stadium; Referee: Saad Al-Kathairi

27 December 2005 2	Al-Ahli (1)	4–0	Abha (1)	Jeddah
19:35	Al-Jassim 45', 50', 69'; Al-Meshal 60'	Report		Stadium: Prince Abdullah Al-Faisal Stadium; Referee: Abdulrahman Al-Tuwaijari

27 December 2005 5	Al-Ettifaq (1)	0–1	Al-Nassr (1)	Dammam
19:35		Report	Al-Zahrani 89'	Stadium: Prince Mohamed bin Fahd Stadium; Referee: Khalil Al Ghamdi

27 December 2005 6	Al-Wehda (1)	2–1	Al-Faisaly (2)	Mecca
19:35	Al-Mehyani 25'; Al-Luhayyani 39' (pen.)	Report	Hawsawi 55'	Stadium: King Abdul Aziz Stadium; Referee: Khaled Al-Dossari

28 December 2005 8	Al-Rawdhah (4)	0–8	Al-Qadisiyah (1)	Al-Hasa
18:50		Report	Al-Ghwinem 8', 87'; Al-Sahlawi 14', 68', 90' (pen.); Landomar 24'; Kassas 70'; Al-Traidi 72'	Stadium: Prince Abdullah bin Jalawi Stadium; Referee: Khaled Al-Zahrani

28 December 2005 3	Al-Hazem (1)	2–3 (a.e.t.)	Al-Shabab (1)	Ar Rass
19:35	Al-Jweer 14'; Fellah 52'	Report	Rogério 2', 84', 97'	Stadium: Al-Hazem Club Stadium; Referee: Abdulrazzaq Al-Mogahwi

28 December 2005 4	Al-Tai (1)	3–4	Al-Hamadah (3)	Ha'il
19:35	Al-Muteb 15'; Al-Enezi 62'; Al-Shallaqi 76'	Report	Omar Kassar 50'; Al-Shamaan 56' (pen.); Al-Mohsen 78', 85'	Stadium: Prince Abdul Aziz bin Musa'ed Stadium; Referee: Misfer Shareef

28 December 2005 7	Al-Hilal (1)	1–0	Al-Ansar (1)	Riyadh
19:50	Joelson 49'	Report		Stadium: Prince Faisal bin Fahd Stadium; Referee: Abdulrahman Al-Qahtani

== Quarter-finals ==
The quarter-finals fixtures were played on 1 and 2 January 2006. All times are local, AST (UTC+3).

1 January 2006 9	Al-Ittihad (1)	1–1 (a.e.t.) (2–4 p)	Al-Ahli (1)	Jeddah
19:45	Job 28'	Report	Massad 52'	Stadium: Prince Abdullah Al-Faisal Stadium; Referee: Ali Al-Mutlaq
	Penalties
	Kariri (penalty scored); Job (penalty scored); Al-Dokhi (penalty missed); Al-Montashari (penalty missed)		(penalty scored) Laarif; (penalty scored) Jahdali; (penalty scored) Al-Bishi; (penalty scored) Akaddar

1 January 2006 11	Al-Wehda (1)	1–0	Al-Nassr (1)	Mecca
19:45	Al-Hazzani 18'	Report		Stadium: King Abdul Aziz Stadium; Referee: Mutraf Al-Qahtani

2 January 2006 10	Al-Shabab (1)	4–1	Al-Hamadah (3)	Riyadh
19:45	Akram 11'; Rogério 16' (pen.); Otaif 35'; Al-Sultan 84'	Report	Al-Shamaan 87' (pen.)	Stadium: Prince Faisal bin Fahd Stadium; Referee: Abdulrahman Al-Tuwaijari

2 January 2006 12	Al-Qadisiyah (1)	0–2	Al-Hilal (1)	Dammam
19:45		Report	Al-Shalhoub 75'; Camacho 88'	Stadium: Prince Mohamed bin Fahd Stadium; Referee: Dhafer Abo Zanda

== Semi-finals ==
The semi-finals first legs were played on 1 and 2 February 2006 while the second legs were played on 5 and 6 February 2006. All times are local, AST (UTC+3).

Team 1	Agg.	Team 2	1st leg	2nd leg
Al-Ahli (1)	5–4	Al-Shabab (1)	2–1	3–3
Al-Wehda (1)	2–5	Al-Hilal (1)	2–3	0–2

=== Matches ===
1 February 2006
19:50

Al-Shabab (1)	1–2	Al-Ahli (1)
Akram 45+1'	Report	Damjanović 21'; Mouath 85'

Prince Faisal bin Fahd Stadium, Riyadh
Referee: Alberto Undiano Mallenco (Spain)
5 February 2006
19:50

Al-Ahli (1)	3–3	Al-Shabab (1)
Mouath 50'; Damjanović 54', 85'	Report	Al-Sultan 41'; Al-Dossari 66' (pen.); Muath 90+2'

Prince Abdullah Al-Faisal Stadium, Jeddah
Referee: Kyros Vassaras (Greece)

Al-Ahli won 5–4 on aggregate.

2 February 2006
19:50

Al-Hilal (1)	3–2	Al-Wehda (1)
Al-Jaber 26', 38'; Camacho 79'	Report	Al-Mehyani 10' (pen.); Amido 90+2'

King Fahd International Stadium, Riyadh
Referee: Paolo Bertini (Italy)
6 February 2006
20:05

Al-Wehda (1)	0–2	Al-Hilal (1)
	Report	Al-Qahtani 23'; Camacho 75'

King Abdul Aziz Stadium, Mecca
Referee: Graham Poll (England)

Al-Hilal won 5–2 on aggregate.

== Final ==
The final was held on 7 April 2006. All times are local, AST (UTC+3).

7 April 2006
20:15

Al-Ahli	0–1	Al-Hilal
	Report	Al-Temyat 22'

King Fahd International Stadium, Riyadh
Referee: Manuel Mejuto González (Spain)

== Top goalscorers ==
As of 7 April 2006

Rank	Player	Club	Goals
1	(Brazil) Rogério	Al-Shabab	4
2	(Saudi Arabia) Taisir Al-Jassim	Al-Ahli	3
2	(Saudi Arabia) Mohammad Al-Sahlawi	Al-Qadisiyah	3
2	(Serbia and Montenegro) Dejan Damjanović	Al-Ahli	3
2	(Brazil) Marcelo Camacho	Al-Hilal	3

== See also ==
- 2005–06 Saudi Premier League
- 2007 AFC Champions League
