= 2015–16 Saudi Pro League =

Professional League
- Season: 2015–2016
- Dates: 19 August 2015 – 14 May 2016
- Champions: Al-Ahli (3rd title)
- Relegated: Najran; Hajer
- AFC Champions League: Al-Ahli; Al-Hilal; Al-Taawoun; Al-Fateh
- Arab Club Championship: Al-Hilal; Al-Nassr
- Matches: 182
- Goals: 508 (2.79 per match)
- Top goalscorer: Omar Al Somah (27 goals)
- Biggest home win: Al-Hilal 7–0 Al-Khaleej (21 November 2015)
- Biggest away win: Hajer 0–5 Al-Ittihad (24 April 2016); Al-Ittihad 0–5 Al-Nassr (8 May 2016)
- Highest scoring: Al-Ittihad 6–2 Al-Raed (4 February 2016)
- Longest winning run: Al-Ahli (8 games)
- Longest unbeaten run: Al-Ahli (17 games)
- Longest winless run: Hajer (15 games)
- Longest losing run: Hajer (9 games)
- Highest attendance: 60,051; Al-Ahli 3–2 Al-Fateh (13 May 2016)
- Lowest attendance: 46; Najran 2–0 Hajer (20 November 2015)
- Average attendance: 6,906

The 2015–16 Saudi Professional League (known as the Abdul Latif Jameel Professional League for sponsorship reasons) was the 40th season of the Saudi Pro League, the top Saudi professional league for association football clubs, since its establishment in 1976. The season began on 19 August 2015 and ended on 14 May 2016. Al-Nassr were the two time defending champions, having won their eighth title the season before. The league was contested by the 12 teams from the 2014–15 season as well as Al-Qadsiah and Al-Wehda, who joined as the promoted clubs from the 2014–15 First Division. They replace Al-Orobah and Al-Shoulla who were relegated to the 2015–16 First Division.

On 24 April, Al-Ahli secured their third league title and first since 1984 with two games to spare after defeating second-placed Al-Hilal 3–1 at home.

Hajer were the first team to be relegated following a 1–0 home defeat to Al-Ahli on 17 April. Najran became the second and final team to be relegated following a 3–3 draw with Al-Raed on the final matchday.

== Teams ==
Fourteen teams competed in the league – the twelve teams from the previous season and the two teams promoted from the First Division. The promoted teams were Al-Qadsiah (returning to the top flight after three years) and Al-Wehda (returning to the top flight after two years). They replaced Al-Orobah (ending their two-year top-flight spell) and Al-Shoulla (ending their three-year top-flight spell).

=== Stadiums and locations ===
Locations of teams in the 2014–15 Saudi Professional League

Note: Table lists in alphabetical order.

Team	Location	Stadium	Capacity
Al-Ahli	Jeddah	King Abdullah Sports City	62,345
Al-Faisaly	Harmah	Prince Salman Sport City Stadium	5,200
Al-Fateh	Hofuf	Prince Abdullah bin Jalawi Stadium	19,096
Al-Hilal	Riyadh	King Fahd International Stadium; Prince Faisal bin Fahd Stadium	62,685; 22,500
Al-Ittihad	Jeddah	King Abdullah Sports City	62,345
Al-Khaleej	Saihat	Prince Mohamed bin Fahd Stadium (Dammam)	21,701
Al-Nassr	Riyadh	King Fahd International Stadium; Prince Faisal bin Fahd Stadium	62,685; 22,500
Al-Qadsiah	Khobar	Prince Saud bin Jalawi Stadium	11,000
Al-Raed	Buraidah	King Abdullah Sport City Stadium	23,600
Al-Shabab	Riyadh	King Fahd International Stadium; Prince Faisal bin Fahd Stadium	62,685; 22,500
Al-Taawoun	Buraidah	King Abdullah Sport City Stadium	23,600
Al-Wehda	Mecca	King Abdul Aziz Stadium	33,195
Hajer	Al-Hasa	Prince Abdullah bin Jalawi Stadium	19,096
Najran	Najran	King Abdullah Sports City Reserve Stadium (Jeddah) (Note: Najran played at the King Abdullah Sports City Reserve Stadium due to the ongoing war in Yemen.)	1,000

=== Personnel and kits ===
Team	Head coach	Captain	Kit manufacturer	Shirt sponsor
Al-Ahli	(Switzerland) Christian Gross	(Saudi Arabia) Taisir Al-Jassim	Umbro	Qatar Airways, Almosafer^{1}
Al-Faisaly	(Romania) Liviu Ciobotariu	(Saudi Arabia) Omar Abdulaziz	Erreà	ALDREES, Roco^{1}
Al-Fateh	(Tunisia) Nacif Beyaoui	(Saudi Arabia) Hamdan Al-Hamdan	Jako	Hyundai, Al Kifah^{1}, AlMoosa Hospital^{1}
Al-Hilal	(Greece) Georgios Donis	(Saudi Arabia) Salman Al-Faraj	Nike	Volkswagen, Mobily, Abdul Samad Al Qurashi^{1}, Tasnee^{1}, Bupa^{2}, ExxonMobil^{2}
Al-Ittihad	(Romania) Victor Pițurcă	(Saudi Arabia) Mohammed Noor	Adidas	Bupa^{2}, ExxonMobil^{2}
Al-Khaleej	(Tunisia) Jalel Kadri	(Saudi Arabia) Hussain Al-Turki	Erreà	Hyundai
Al-Nassr	(Spain) Raúl Caneda	(Saudi Arabia) Hussein Abdulghani	Sporta	Mobily
Al-Qadsiah	(Saudi Arabia) Hamad Al-Dossari	(Saudi Arabia) Naif Hazazi	Lotto	eXtra
Al-Raed	(Serbia) Aleksandar Ilić	(Saudi Arabia) Ibrahim Madkhali	Hattrick	Hana Water
Al-Shabab	(Tunisia) Fathi Al-Jabal	(Saudi Arabia) Ahmed Otaif	Romai	
Al-Taawoun	(Portugal) José Gomes	(Saudi Arabia) Adnan Fallatah	Erreà	Herfy, Al Qassim Corner^{1}
Al-Wehda	(Algeria) Kheïreddine Madoui	(Saudi Arabia) Majed Al-Hazzani	Erreà	Nagoor Group
Hajer	(Saudi Arabia) Abdullah Al-Janoubi	(Saudi Arabia) Mustafa Malayekah	Erreà	Al-Ajmi Co., Almulhim Auto
Najran	(Brazil) Hélio dos Anjos	(Saudi Arabia) Abdulaziz Hamsal	Uhlsport	Polystar

- ^{1} On the back of the strip.
- ^{2} On the right sleeve of the strip.

=== Managerial changes ===
Team	Outgoing manager	Manner of departure	Date of vacancy	Position in table	Incoming manager	Date of appointment
Al-Shabab	(Egypt) Adel Abdel Rahman	End of contract	15 May 2015	Pre-season	(Uruguay) Álvaro Gutiérrez	21 May 2015
Al-Raed	(Tunisia) Ammar Souayah	End of contract	19 May 2015	Pre-season	(Algeria) Abdelkader Amrani	8 June 2015
Najran	(Algeria) Fouad Bouali	End of contract	19 May 2015	Pre-season	(Tunisia) Fathi Al-Jabal	27 June 2015
Al-Faisaly	(Portugal) Toni Conceição	Sacked	22 May 2015	Pre-season	(Romania) Liviu Ciobotariu	6 June 2015
Al-Ittihad	(Romania) Victor Pițurcă	Sacked	11 June 2015	Pre-season	(Romania) László Bölöni	22 July 2015
Al-Raed	(Algeria) Abdelkader Amrani	Sacked	29 August 2015	13th	(Greece) Takis Lemonis	3 September 2015
Al-Nassr	(Uruguay) Jorge da Silva	Sacked	24 October 2015	7th	(Colombia) René Higuita (caretaker)	24 October 2015
Al-Nassr	(Colombia) René Higuita (caretaker)	End of caretaker period	28 October 2015	6th	(Italy) Fabio Cannavaro	28 October 2015
Al-Qadsiah	(Tunisia) Jameel Qassem	Sacked	30 October 2015	9th	(Brazil) Alexandre Gallo	30 October 2015
Al-Wehda	(Uruguay) Juan Jacinto Rodríguez	Sacked	30 October 2015	13th	(Egypt) Badreldin Hamed (caretaker)	30 October 2015
Hajer	(Montenegro) Nebojša Jovović	Sacked	30 October 2015	11th	(Saudi Arabia) Abdullah Al-Janoubi (caretaker)	30 October 2015
Hajer	(Saudi Arabia) Abdullah Al-Janoubi (caretaker)	End of caretaker period	5 November 2015	12th	(Belgium) Stéphane Demol	5 November 2015
Al-Wehda	(Egypt) Badreldin Hamed (caretaker)	End of caretaker period	6 November 2015	10th	(Algeria) Kheïreddine Madoui	6 November 2015
Al-Ittihad	(Romania) László Bölöni	Sacked	24 November 2015	3rd	(Egypt) Adel Abdel Rahman (caretaker)	24 November 2015
Al-Ittihad	(Egypt) Adel Abdel Rahman (caretaker)	End of caretaker period	9 December 2015	3rd	(Romania) Victor Pițurcă	9 December 2015
Najran	(Tunisia) Fathi Al-Jabal	Sacked	17 December 2015	13th	(Saudi Arabia) Al Hasan Al-Yami (caretaker)	17 December 2015
Najran	(Saudi Arabia) Al Hasan Al-Yami (caretaker)	End of caretaker period	25 December 2015	13th	(Brazil) Hélio dos Anjos	25 December 2015
Al-Shabab	(Uruguay) Álvaro Gutiérrez	Sacked	3 January 2016	6th	(Tunisia) Fathi Al-Jabal	3 January 2016
Al-Qadsiah	(Brazil) Alexandre Gallo	Mutual consent	29 January 2016	11th	(Saudi Arabia) Hamad Al-Dossari	30 January 2016
Al-Raed	(Greece) Takis Lemonis	Sacked	1 February 2016	12th	(Morocco) Reda Hakam (caretaker)	1 February 2016
Al-Raed	(Morocco) Reda Hakam (caretaker)	End of caretaker period	4 February 2016	12th	(Serbia) Aleksandar Ilić	4 February 2016
Al-Nassr	(Italy) Fabio Cannavaro	Sacked	12 February 2016	6th	(Colombia) René Higuita (caretaker)	12 February 2016
Al-Nassr	(Colombia) René Higuita (caretaker)	End of caretaker period	19 February 2016	7th	(Spain) Raúl Caneda	19 February 2016
Hajer	(Belgium) Stéphane Demol	Sacked	8 March 2016	14th	(Saudi Arabia) Abdullah Al-Janoubi	8 March 2016

=== Foreign players ===
The number of foreign players is limited to 4 per team, and should not be a goalkeeper.

Players name in bold indicates the player is registered during the mid-season transfer window.

Club	Player 1	Player 2	Player 3	Player 4	Former players
Al-Ahli	(Brazil) **Marquinho**	(Egypt) Mohamed Abdel Shafy	(Greece) Giannis Fetfatzidis	(Ba'athist Syria) Omar Al Somah	(Sweden) Nabil Bahoui
Al-Faisaly	(Brazil) **Adriano Pardal**	(Equatorial Guinea) Javi Balboa	(Guinea-Bissau) Abel Camará	(Togo) Sadat Ouro-Akoriko	(Brazil) Fernando Gabriel (Cameroon) André Ndame Ndame (Jordan) Hamza Al-Dardour (Nigeria) Ifeanyi Onyilo
Al-Fateh	(Brazil) Élton Arábia	(Iraq) Salam Shaker	(Ivory Coast) Patrick Gbala	(Venezuela) **Juan Falcón**	(Brazil) Josimar (Serbia) Marko Stanojević
Al-Hilal	(Brazil) Aílton	(Brazil) Carlos Eduardo	(Brazil) Digão	(South Korea) Kwak Tae-hwi	
Al-Ittihad	(Ghana) Sulley Muntari	(Romania) Lucian Sânmărtean	(Venezuela) Gelmin Rivas		(Australia) James Troisi
Al-Khaleej	(Cameroon) Aminou Bouba	(Guinea) Aboubacar Sylla	(Ivory Coast) **Abdoulaye Koffi**	(Jordan) Ibrahim Al-Zawahreh	(Iraq) Marwan Hussein
Al-Nassr	(Bahrain) Mohamed Husain	(Brazil) **Marquinhos Gabriel**	(Mali) Modibo Maïga	(Poland) Adrian Mierzejewski	(Morocco) Youness Mokhtar (Uruguay) Fabián Estoyanoff
Al-Qadsiah	(Brazil) **Gilberto Macena**	(Brazil) **Jandson**	(Brazil) **Vitor Júnior**	(Iraq) Saad Abdul-Amir	(Algeria) Farid Mellouli (Brazil) Diego Maurício (Brazil) Jhon Cley (Brazil) Rubinho (Puerto Rico) Héctor Ramos
Al-Raed	(Armenia) **Marcos Pizzelli**	(Burkina Faso) **Boubacar Kébé**	(Guinea) **Ismaël Bangoura**	(Oman) Eid Al-Farsi	(Guinea) Kamil Zayatte (Iraq) Amjad Radhi (Tunisia) Oussama Darragi
Al-Shabab	(Algeria) **Mohamed Benyettou**	(Brazil) **Camilo**	(Brazil) Rafinha	(Uruguay) Diego Arismendi	(Kuwait) Saif Al Hashan (Uruguay) Mauricio Affonso
Al-Taawoun	(Brazil) Sandro Manoel	(Cameroon) Paul Alo'o	(Portugal) Ricardo Machado	(Ba'athist Syria) Jehad Al-Hussain	
Al-Wehda	(Brazil) **Anderson**	(Cameroon) **Ernest Webnje Nfor**	(Ba'athist Syria) Jehad Al Baour	(Uruguay) Adolfo Lima	(Poland) Łukasz Gikiewicz (Tunisia) Zouheir Dhaouadi
Hajer	(Brazil) **Bruno Lopes**	(Cameroon) **André Ndame Ndame**	(Palestine) **Ashraf Nu'man**	(Senegal) **Adama François Sene**	(Bolivia) Gualberto Mojica (Iraq) Saif Salman (Serbia) Dragan Ćeran (Serbia) Nemanja Tubić
Najran	(Brazil) **Adriano Alves**	(Brazil) **Bismark**	(Brazil) **Eric**	(Brazil) **Tozin**	(France) Mamadou Wagué (Ghana) Winful Cobbinah (Kuwait) Faisal Zayid (Mali) Aboubacar Tambadou (Senegal) Malick Mané (Sierra Leone) David Simbo

== League table ==
Pos	Team	Pld	W	D	L	GF	GA	GD	Pts	Qualification or relegation
1	Al-Ahli (C)	26	19	6	1	55	21	+34	63	Qualification for the AFC Champions League group stage (Note: Since the winners of the 2016 King Cup, Al-Ahli, qualified for AFC Champions League group stage based on their league position, the spot awarded to the cup winner (2017 AFC Champions League group stage) was passed to the third-placed team and the spot for the third-placed team (AFC Champions League play-off round) was passed to the fourth-placed team.)
2	Al-Hilal	26	17	4	5	52	23	+29	55	Qualification for the AFC Champions League group stage and Arab Club Championship group stage
3	Al-Ittihad (Note: Al-Ittihad did not obtain an AFC license. Therefore, even if they earn the right to play in Asian competitions based on league position, they will not be able to participate.)	26	15	4	7	54	37	+17	49	
4	Al-Taawoun	26	13	6	7	54	35	+19	45	Qualification for the AFC Champions League group stage
5	Al-Fateh	26	11	8	7	35	28	+7	41	Qualification for the AFC Champions League play-off round
6	Al-Shabab	26	11	6	9	27	28	−1	39	
7	Al-Khaleej	26	8	9	9	27	43	−16	33	
8	Al-Nassr	26	7	11	8	39	33	+6	32	Qualification for the Arab Club Championship group stage (Note: Al-Nassr earned a place in the Arab Club Championship by virtue of being the 2016 King Cup runners-up.)
9	Al-Wehda	26	8	7	11	30	37	−7	31	
10	Al-Faisaly	26	7	8	11	28	37	−9	29	
11	Al-Qadsiah	26	6	10	10	26	32	−6	28	
12	Al-Raed (O)	26	6	6	14	30	45	−15	24	Qualification to relegation play-offs
13	Najran (R)	26	5	6	15	36	53	−17	21	Relegation to the First Division
14	Hajer (R)	26	2	3	21	15	56	−41	9	Relegation to the First Division

Source: SLstat.com
Rules for classification: 1) Points; 2) Head-to-head points; 3) Head-to-head goal difference; 4) Total goal difference; 5) Total goals scored; 6) Play-off (only for deciding champion, relegation and AFC competitions participation).
(C) Champions; (O) Play-off winners; (R) Relegated

=== Positions by round ===
The following table lists the positions of teams after each week of matches. In order to preserve the chronological evolution, any postponed matches are not included to the round at which they were originally scheduled, but added to the full round they were played immediately afterwards. If a club from the Saudi Professional League wins the King Cup, they will qualify for the AFC Champions League, unless they have already qualified for it through their league position. In this case, an additional AFC Champions League group stage berth will be given to the 3rd placed team, and the AFC Champions League play-off round spot will be given to 4th.

Team ╲ Round	1	2	3	4	5	6	7	8	9	10	11	12	13	14	15	16	17	18	19	20	21	22	23	24	25	26
Al-Ahli	6	4	2	2	1	2	2	2	2	1	1	1	1	2	2	2	2	2	1	1	1	1	1	1	1	1
Al-Hilal	3	2	1	1	3	1	1	1	1	2	2	2	2	1	1	1	1	1	2	2	2	2	2	2	2	2
Al-Ittihad	4	3	5	4	2	3	4	5	3	3	4	3	3	3	3	3	3	3	3	3	3	3	3	3	3	3
Al-Taawoun	8	6	3	5	5	5	5	3	4	4	3	4	4	4	4	4	4	4	4	4	4	4	4	4	4	4
Al-Fateh	2	7	7	6	8	9	7	9	8	9	7	9	5	7	7	7	6	8	9	7	6	6	5	5	5	5
Al-Shabab	1	1	4	3	4	4	3	4	5	7	9	5	6	5	5	5	5	5	5	5	5	5	6	6	6	6
Al-Khaleej	13	14	13	10	10	8	6	7	6	5	6	6	7	8	8	8	9	9	6	6	7	7	7	7	7	7
Al-Nassr	7	8	6	7	6	6	8	6	7	6	5	7	8	6	6	6	7	7	8	9	8	8	8	8	8	8
Al-Wehda	14	11	12	12	13	10	11	13	10	10	10	10	10	10	10	10	10	11	10	10	10	10	10	10	10	9
Al-Faisaly	11	12	9	9	7	7	9	8	9	8	8	8	9	9	9	9	8	6	7	8	9	9	9	9	9	10
Al-Qadsiah	5	5	8	8	9	11	10	11	12	11	11	11	11	11	11	11	11	13	12	13	13	11	12	12	11	11
Al-Raed	12	13	14	14	12	13	13	10	11	12	12	13	12	12	12	13	13	12	13	12	12	13	11	11	12	12
Najran	10	9	11	13	14	14	12	12	13	13	13	12	13	13	13	12	12	10	11	11	11	12	13	13	13	13
Hajer	9	10	10	11	11	12	14	14	14	14	14	14	14	14	14	14	14	14	14	14	14	14	14	14	14	14

Leader
2017 AFC Champions League group stage
2017 AFC Champions League play-off round
Qualified for relegation play-off
Relegation to 2016–17 First Division

Source: SLstat.com

== Results ==
Home \ Away	AHL	FSY	FAT	HIL	ITT	KHJ	NSR	QAD	RAE	SHB	TWN	WHD	HJR	NAJ
Al-Ahli		1–1	3–2	3–1	4–2	1–1	4–2	2–0	3–1	3–1	2–2	2–0	1–0	1–2
Al-Faisaly	1–2		1–2	0–1	1–3	1–2	2–2	1–0	2–2	0–0	1–2	2–1	3–1	2–2
Al-Fateh	0–2	2–1		1–2	1–1	0–0	2–1	2–2	1–0	0–0	1–0	2–0	1–1	3–1
Al-Hilal	1–2	0–0	3–3		0–1	7–0	2–0	1–0	1–0	1–1	3–1	2–0	4–1	2–0
Al-Ittihad	0–3	1–2	0–0	4–3		4–1	0–5	1–1	6–2	2–1	4–1	0–2	5–0	1–0
Al-Khaleej	0–4	2–1	0–2	0–3	2–2		1–1	0–0	1–0	1–2	1–1	1–4	0–1	3–1
Al-Nassr	1–1	0–0	3–1	1–2	3–0	1–1		0–0	1–2	1–2	3–2	1–1	0–0	2–0
Al-Qadsiah	0–2	1–0	2–1	0–0	1–3	2–0	2–2		1–1	0–1	1–2	1–1	1–1	4–2
Al-Raed	2–5	5–0	0–0	0–1	0–2	0–2	0–0	2–1		0–1	1–1	1–0	2–1	2–3
Al-Shabab	1–1	0–1	1–0	0–1	1–2	0–0	1–0	0–2	3–1		0–1	1–1	3–1	3–2
Al-Taawoun	0–0	3–1	1–2	1–0	2–1	2–3	3–3	5–1	2–0	4–0		4–2	4–0	4–1
Al-Wehda	0–1	2–2	1–3	1–3	0–2	0–0	0–2	1–0	3–1	2–1	2–1		1–0	1–1
Hajer	0–1	0–1	1–0	1–5	0–5	1–2	0–1	0–2	1–2	1–2	1–4	1–2		1–2
Najran	0–1	0–1	1–3	2–3	1–2	2–3	4–3	1–1	3–3	0–1	1–1	2–2	2–0	

Updated to match(es) played on 14 May 2016. Source: SLstat.com
Legend: Blue = home team win; Yellow = draw; Red = away team win.

=== Season progress ===
Team ╲ Round	1	2	3	4	5	6	7	8	9	10	11	12	13	14	15	16	17	18	19	20	21	22	23	24	25	26
Al-Ahli	D	W	W	W	W	D	W	W	D	W	W	W	W	D	D	W	D	L	W	W	W	W	W	W	W	W
Al-Faisaly	L	L	W	D	W	D	L	D	D	L	W	W	L	W	L	L	W	W	D	L	L	L	L	D	D	D
Al-Fateh	W	L	D	D	D	D	W	W	L	W	L	W	L	D	D	L	W	L	D	W	W	W	W	D	W	L
Al-Hilal	W	W	W	W	L	W	W	W	W	W	L	W	W	W	D	W	L	L	D	W	W	D	W	L	W	D
Al-Ittihad	W	W	L	W	W	D	W	L	D	W	W	L	W	W	W	W	D	W	D	L	L	W	W	W	L	L
Al-Khaleej	L	L	D	W	D	W	W	L	D	W	D	D	D	D	D	L	L	W	W	W	L	L	W	D	L	L
Al-Nassr	D	D	W	L	W	D	L	D	W	D	D	W	L	W	D	L	D	D	D	L	W	L	L	D	W	L
Al-Qadsiah	W	D	L	L	D	L	L	L	D	L	W	D	D	L	D	L	D	L	D	L	W	W	D	D	W	W
Al-Raed	L	L	L	D	D	L	W	D	W	D	L	L	L	L	L	L	L	W	L	W	W	L	W	D	L	D
Al-Shabab	W	W	D	W	D	D	L	W	L	L	L	L	W	W	W	W	W	W	L	L	L	D	L	D	D	W
Al-Taawoun	D	W	W	L	D	W	W	D	W	L	W	W	L	D	W	W	W	L	D	W	L	W	L	D	L	W
Al-Wehda	L	D	L	D	L	W	L	L	L	W	W	L	D	L	D	L	L	D	W	W	L	W	D	D	W	W
Hajer	D	L	D	L	L	L	L	L	L	L	L	L	D	L	L	W	W	L	L	L	L	L	L	L	L	L
Najran	L	D	L	L	L	L	L	W	D	L	L	L	W	L	D	W	L	W	D	L	W	L	L	D	L	D

Source: SLstat.com
W = Win; D = Draw; L = Lose

== Relegation play-offs ==
Al-Raed who finished 12th faced Al-Batin who finished 3rd in the 2015–16 Saudi First Division for a two-legged play-off. The winner on aggregate score would take part in the 2016–17 Saudi Professional League. Al-Raed won 5–3 on aggregate and secured their place in the next season.

Team 1	Agg.	Team 2	1st leg	2nd leg
Al-Batin	3–5	Al-Raed	2–1	1–4

=== First leg ===
19 May 2016
20:45 AST
(UTC+3)

Al-Batin	2–1	Al-Raed
Al-Yami 15' (o.g.); Metlaq 58'	Report	Bangoura 50'

Al-Batin Club Stadium, Hafar al-Batin
Referee: Mohammed Al-Hoaish

=== Second leg ===
26 May 2016
20:45 AST
(UTC+3)

Al-Raed	4–1	Al-Batin
Pizzelli 3' (pen.); Al-Shehri 30'; Al-Sawadi 81'; Bangoura 90+4' (pen.)	Report	Jadoua 84'

King Abdullah Sport City Stadium, Buraidah
Referee: Shukri Al-Hanfoush

== Season statistics ==
=== Scoring ===
==== Top scorers ====
Rank	Player	Club	Goals
1	(Ba'athist Syria) Omar Al Somah	Al-Ahli	27
2	(Venezuela) Gelmin Rivas	Al-Ittihad	19
3	(Brazil) Carlos Eduardo	Al-Hilal	14
4	(Saudi Arabia) Abdulmajeed Al-Ruwaili	Al-Taawoun	13
5	(Brazil) Élton Arábia	Al-Fateh	12
6	(Saudi Arabia) Ali Awaji	Al-Wehda	11
7	(Cameroon) Paul Alo'o	Al-Taawoun	10
7	(Poland) Adrian Mierzejewski	Al-Nassr	10
9	(Equatorial Guinea) Javi Balboa	Al-Faisaly	8
9	(Saudi Arabia) Hamad Al-Juhaim	Al-Fateh	8

==== Hat-tricks ====
Player	For	Against	Result	Date	Ref
(Venezuela) Gelmin Rivas	Al-Ittihad	Al-Qadsiah	3–1 (A)	17 October 2015	
(Ba'athist Syria) Omar Al Somah	Al-Ahli	Al-Nassr	4–2 (H)	18 October 2015	
(Venezuela) Gelmin Rivas	Al-Ittihad	Hajer	5–0 (H)	10 December 2015	
(Ba'athist Syria) Omar Al Somah	Al-Ahli	Al-Raed	3–1 (H)	14 December 2015	
(Saudi Arabia) Yasser Al-Qahtani^{4}	Al-Hilal	Hajer	4–1 (H)	8 May 2016	
(Ba'athist Syria) Omar Al Somah	Al-Ahli	Al-Raed	5–2 (A)	8 May 2016	

Notes

(H) – Home; (A) – Away
^{4} Player scored 4 goals

=== Clean sheets ===
Rank	Player	Club	Clean sheets
1	(Saudi Arabia) Khalid Sharahili	Al-Hilal	10
1	(Saudi Arabia) Yasser Al-Mosailem	Al-Ahli	10
3	(Saudi Arabia) Mohammed Al-Owais	Al-Shabab	8
4	(Saudi Arabia) Faisel Masrahi	Al-Shabab	7
5	(Saudi Arabia) Abdullah Al-Owaishir	Al-Fateh	6
6	(Saudi Arabia) Assaf Al-Qarni	Al-Ittihad	5
6	(Saudi Arabia) Fayz Al-Sabiay	Al-Taawoun	5
6	(Saudi Arabia) Mansoor Al-Najai	Al-Faisaly	5
6	(Saudi Arabia) Moslem Al Freej	Al-Khaleej	5
10	(Saudi Arabia) Fahad Al-Shammari	Al-Raed	4
10	(Saudi Arabia) Mutab Sharahili	Al-Nassr	4

=== Discipline ===
==== Player ====
- Most yellow cards: 9
  - (Saudi Arabia) Adnan Fallatah (Al-Taawoun)
  - (Saudi Arabia) Salman Hazazi (Al-Khaleej)
- Most red cards: 2
  - (Cameroon) Aminou Bouba (Al-Khaleej)
  - (France) Mamadou Wagué (Najran)
  - (Saudi Arabia) Mahmoud Muaaz (Al-Taawoun)

==== Club ====
- Most yellow cards: 61
  - Al-Khaleej
- Most red cards: 7
  - Najran

== Awards ==
=== Annual awards ===
Award	Winner	Club
Saudi Pro League Player of the Year	(Syria) Omar Al-Somah	Al-Ahli
Saudi Pro League top scorer	(Syria) Omar Al-Somah	Al-Ahli

=== Team of the Season ===
Team of the Season
Goalkeeper	(Saudi Arabia) Mohammed Al-Owais (Al-Shabab)			
Defenders	(Saudi Arabia) Yasser Al-Shahrani (Al-Hilal)	(Saudi Arabia) Motaz Hawsawi (Al-Ahli)	(Saudi Arabia) Mohammed Jahfali (Al-Hilal)	(Saudi Arabia) Abdullah Al-Zori (Al-Hilal)
Midfielders	(Poland) Adrian Mierzejewski (Al-Nassr)	(Saudi Arabia) Abdulmajeed Al-Ruwaili (Al-Taawoun)	(Saudi Arabia) Taisir Al-Jassim (Al-Ahli)	(Brazil) Carlos Eduardo (Al-Hilal)
Forwards	(Syria) Omar Al-Somah (Al-Ahli)	(Cameroon) Paul Alo'o Efoulou (Al-Taawoun)		

== Attendances ==
=== By round ===
2015–16 Professional League Attendance
Round	Total	GP.	Avg. Per Game
Round 1	32,122	7	4,589
Round 2	29,840	7	4,263
Round 3	93,882	7	13,412
Round 4	53,701	7	7,672
Round 5	69,084	7	9,869
Round 6	39,156	7	5,594
Round 7	48,285	7	6,898
Round 8	57,644	7	8,235
Round 9	44,462	7	6,352
Round 10	72,727	7	10,390
Round 11	47,422	7	6,775
Round 12	43,783	7	6,255
Round 13	30,295	7	4,328
Round 14	63,279	7	9,040
Round 15	52,709	7	7,530
Round 16	28,518	7	4,074
Round 17	55,137	7	7,877
Round 18	38,551	7	5,507
Round 19	53,191	7	7,599
Round 20	56,595	7	8,085
Round 21	45,342	7	6,477
Round 22	18,184	7	2,598
Round 23	34,391	7	4,913
Round 24	67,870	7	9,696
Round 25	14,018	7	2,003
Round 26	66,622	7	9,517
Total	1,256,810	182	6,906

=== By team ===
Pos	Team	Total	High	Low	Average	Change
1	Al-Ahli	360,312	60,051	7,144	27,716	−18.7%
2	Al-Ittihad	295,465	59,037	1,787	22,728	−46.4%
3	Al-Hilal	154,338	26,653	2,371	11,872	−8.7%
4	Al-Nassr	82,193	21,716	1,074	6,323	−60.9%
5	Al-Taawoun	72,910	12,507	1,274	5,608	+108.9%
6	Al-Raed	61,520	12,324	1,474	4,732	+42.9%
7	Al-Shabab	38,201	14,850	392	2,939	−10.7%
8	Al-Wehda	37,990	10,939	310	2,922	n/a^{†}
9	Al-Fateh	37,184	11,688	282	2,860	+3.0%
10	Al-Qadisiyah	35,022	12,050	182	2,694	n/a^{†}
11	Najran	34,761	18,777	46	2,674	+181.8%
12	Hajer	22,211	6,754	106	1,709	+5.4%
13	Al-Khaleej	18,445	6,714	93	1,419	−47.2%
14	Al-Faisaly	6,258	1,750	63	481	−15.6%
	League total	1,256,810	60,051	46	6,906	−24.5%

Updated to games played on 14 May 2016
Notes:
^{†} Teams played previous season in First Division.

== See also ==
- 2015–16 Saudi First Division
- 2015–16 Saudi Second Division
- 2016 King Cup
- 2015–16 Crown Prince Cup
- 2015 Super Cup
