= 2006 Saudi Crown Prince Cup final =

- Event: 2005–06 Saudi Crown Prince Cup
Al-Ahli	Al-Hilal
0	1
- Date: 7 April 2006
- Venue: King Fahd International Stadium, Riyadh
- Referee: Manuel Mejuto González (Spain)

The 2006 Saudi Crown Prince Cup final was the 31st final of the Crown Prince Cup, Saudi Arabia's main football knock-out competition at the time.

It took place on 7 April 2006 at the King Fahd International Stadium in Riyadh, Saudi Arabia, and was contested between Al-Ahli and Al-Hilal. It was Al-Ahli's ninth Crown Prince Cup final and Al-Hilal's seventh final. It was Al-Ahli's first final since 2004 and Al-Hilal's second consecutive final.

Al-Hilal won the game 1–0 to claim their sixth Crown Prince Cup title. As winners of the 2005–06 Saudi Crown Prince Cup, Al-Hilal qualified for the 2007 AFC Champions League group stage.

== Teams ==
Team	Previous finals appearances (bold indicates winners)
Al-Ahli	8 (**1957**, 1958, **1970**, 1974, **1998**, **2002**, 2003, 2004)
Al-Hilal	6 (**1964**, **1995**, 1999, **2000**, **2003**, **2005**)

== Venue ==
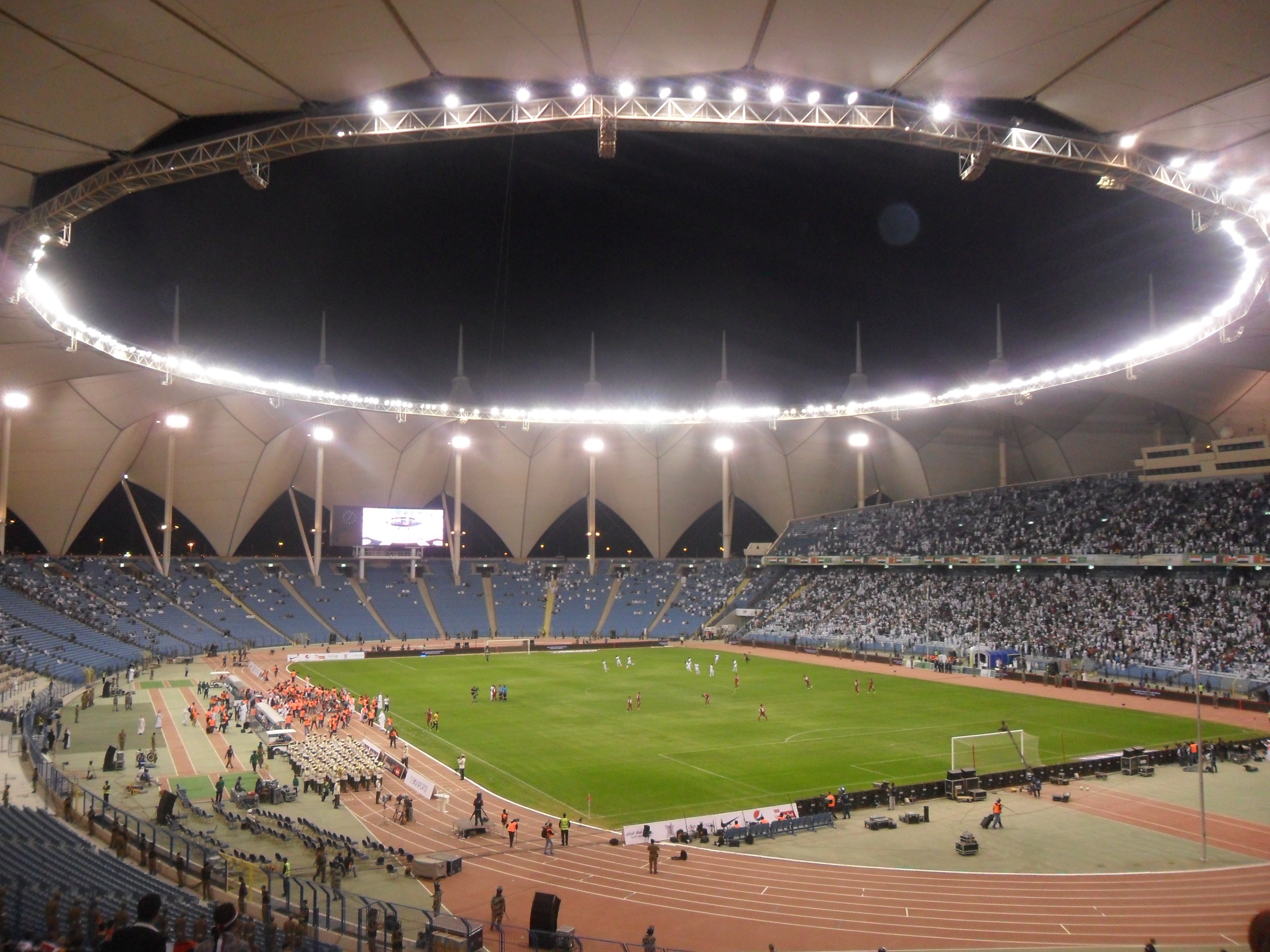
The King Fahd International Stadium in Riyadh hosted the final

The King Fahd International Stadium was announced as the host of the final venue. This was the seventh Crown Prince Cup final hosted in the King Fahd International Stadium following those in 1992, 1994, 1998, 2003, 2004, and 2005.

The King Fahd International Stadium was built in 1982 and was opened in 1987. The stadium was used as a venue for the 1992, 1995, and the 1997 editions of the FIFA Confederations Cup. Its current capacity is 68,752 and it is used by the Saudi Arabia national football team, Al-Nassr, Al-Shabab, and major domestic matches.

== Background ==
Al-Hilal reached their seventh final after a 5–2 aggregate win against Al-Wehda. This was Al-Hilal's second final in a row. Previously, they won finals in 1964, 1995, 2000, 2003, and 2005, and lost in 1999.

Al-Ahli reached their ninth final, after a 5–4 aggregate win against Al-Shabab. They reached their first final since 2004. They finished as runners-up after losing to Al-Ittihad in that year's final. Previously, they won finals in 1957, 1970, 1998, and 2002, and lost in 1958, 1974, 2003, and 2004.

This was the second meeting between these two sides in the Crown Prince Cup final. Al-Hilal won in 2003. This was the 6th meeting between these two sides in the Crown Prince Cup; previously Al-Hilal won 3 times, Al-Ahli won once and the two teams drew once. The two teams played each other three times in the season prior to the final with Al-Hilal winning all three matches.

== Road to the final ==
Al-Ahli		Round	Al-Hilal
Opponent	Result		Opponent	Result
Abha	4–0 (H)	Round of 16	Al-Ansar	1–0 (H)
Al-Ittihad	1–1 (4–2 p) (A)	Quarter-finals	Al-Qadisiyah	2–0 (A)
Al-Shabab	2–1 (A)	Semi-finals	Al-Wehda	3–2 (H)
Al-Shabab	3–3 (H)	Semi-finals	Al-Wehda	2–0 (A)

Key: (H) = Home; (A) = Away

== Match ==
=== Details ===
7 April 2006
20:15 AST

Al-Ahli	0–1	Al-Hilal
	Report	Al-Temyat 22'

King Fahd International Stadium, Riyadh
Referee: Manuel Mejuto González (Spain)

**Al-Ahli**	**Al-Hilal**

GK	1	(Saudi Arabia) Yasser Al-Mosailem
RB	14	(Saudi Arabia) Mohammad Massad		(substituted off) 77'
CB	3	(Saudi Arabia) Jufain Al-Bishi
CB	19	(Saudi Arabia) Walid Jahdali	(yellow card) 52'
LB	12	(Saudi Arabia) Mohamed Al-Bishi	(yellow card) 90+4'
RM	2	(Morocco) Abdelhaq Ait Laarif
CM	8	(Saudi Arabia) Taisir Al-Jassim		(substituted off) 83'
CM	15	(Saudi Arabia) Saheb Al-Abdullah
LM	24	(Saudi Arabia) Hussein Abdulghani (c)		(substituted off) 83'
CF	9	(Brazil) Malek Mouath
CF	27	(Serbia and Montenegro) Dejan Damjanović
Substitutes:
MF	7	(Saudi Arabia) Turky Al-Thagafi		(substituted in) 77'
MF	10	(Saudi Arabia) Saleh Al-Mohammedi		(substituted in) 83'
FW	11	(Saudi Arabia) Waleed Al-Gizani		(substituted in) 83'
Manager:
(Serbia and Montenegro) Nebojša Vučković

GK	1	(Saudi Arabia) Mohamed Al-Deayea (c)
RB	19	(Saudi Arabia) Abdulaziz Khathran
CB	3	(Brazil) Marcelo Tavares	(yellow card) 53'
CB	17	(Saudi Arabia) Fahed Al-Mofarij
LB	12	(Saudi Arabia) Kamel Al-Mousa
DM	6	(Saudi Arabia) Khaled Aziz
DM	13	(Saudi Arabia) Omar Al-Ghamdi
RW	10	(Saudi Arabia) Mohammad Al-Shalhoub		(substituted off) 63'
AM	8	(Brazil) Marcelo Camacho
LW	11	(Saudi Arabia) Nawaf Al-Temyat		(substituted off) 77'
CF	20	(Saudi Arabia) Yasser Al-Qahtani		(substituted off) 85'
Substitutes:
FW	7	(Saudi Arabia) Abdullah Al-Jamaan		(substituted in) 85'
FW	9	(Saudi Arabia) Sami Al-Jaber		(substituted in) 77'
DF	27	(Saudi Arabia) Sultan Al-Bargan		(substituted in) 63'
Manager:
(Brazil) Jose Kléber

Assistant referees:
Clemente Ayete Plou (Spain)
Oscar Martínez Samaniego (Spain)
Fourth official:
Bernardino González Vázquez (Spain)

**Match rules**

- 90 minutes.
- 30 minutes of extra-time if necessary.
- Penalty shoot-out if scores still level.
- Seven named substitutes.
- Maximum of three substitutions.

== See also ==
- 2005–06 Saudi Crown Prince Cup
- 2005–06 Saudi Premier League
- 2007 AFC Champions League
