= Taisir Al-Jassim =

Saudi Arabian footballer (born 1984)

Taiseer Al-Jassim
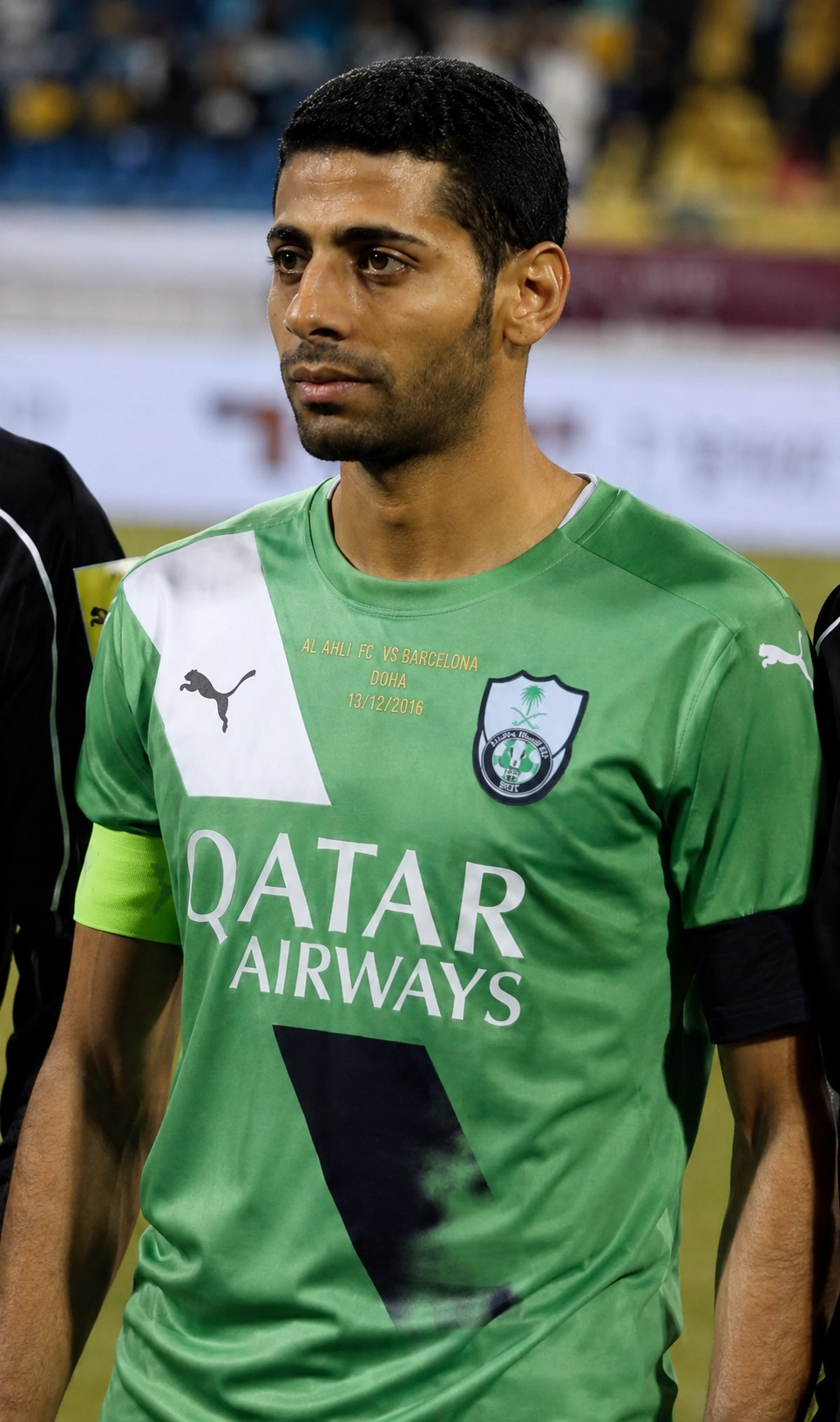
- Taisir plays Al-Ahli in 2016

Personal information
- Full name: Taiseer Jaber Abdulmohsen Al-Jassim
- Date of birth: 25 July 1984 (age 42)
- Place of birth: Al-Hasa, Saudi Arabia
- Height: 1.69 m (5 ft 7 in)
- Position: Midfielder

Youth career
- 1995–2001: Hajer Club
- 2001–2003: Al-Ahli

Senior career*
Years	Team	Apps	(Gls)
2002–2019	Al-Ahli	472	(64)
2007	→ Al-Gharafa (loan)	2	(1)
2009	→ Qatar SC (loan)	2	(1)
2018–2019	→ Al-Wehda (loan)	8	(1)
2019–2020	Al-Nasr	10	(2)

International career^{‡}
2004–2018	Saudi Arabia	134	(19)
- * Club domestic league appearances and goals as of 21:05, 14 February 2020 (UTC) ‡ National team caps and goals as of 17:01, 20 June 2018 (UTC)

Taiseer Jaber Abdulmohsen Al-Jassim (Arabic: تَيْسِير جَابِر عَبْد الْمُحْسِن الْجَاسِم, can also be spelled as Taisir Al-Jassim, born 25 July 1984) is a Saudi Arabian former professional footballer who played as a midfielder. He was the captain of Al-Ahli Saudi and vice-captain of the Saudi Arabia national team. He retired from international football in 2018 and from all levels of football as a player in 2020.

== Club career ==
=== Al-Ahli ===
Taiseer started his career at Hajer before joining Al-Ahli on 19 June 2001. His older brother Misfer also joined Al-Ahli from Hajer before his signing. He made his debut for Al-Ahli on 18 October 2002 in the Federation Cup final against Al-Ettifaq. He made his league debut on 31 October 2002 in the 4–0 win against Al-Ettifaq. On 26 February 2005, Taiseer scored his first goal for Al-Ahli in the 3–2 derby loss against Al-Ittihad.

On 8 March 2005, Taiseer made his continental debut and scored once for Al-Ahli in the 2005 AFC Champions League against Iraqi side Al-Zawraa. On 6 October 2005, Taiseer appeared in his second Federation Cup final for Al-Ahli in the 2–0 loss against Al-Hilal. On 27 December 2005, Taiseer scored his first hat-trick for Al-Ahli against Abha in the Round of 16 of the 2005–06 Saudi Crown Prince Cup. On 7 April 2006, he started the 2006 Saudi Crown Prince Cup Final which ended in a 1–0 defeat against Al-Hilal.

On 9 February 2007, Taiseer appeared in his third Federation Cup in the 3–0 win Al-Ittihad. Two months later on 27 April 2007, Taiseer started and scored in the 2007 Saudi Crown Prince Cup Final against Al-Ittihad to help Al-Ahli win their fifth title. On 8 May 2007, Taiseer was loaned out to Qatari side Al-Gharafa and appeared twice and scored once in the Emir Cup, as Al-Gharafa were eliminated in the semi-finals.

On 3 December 2008, Taiseer appeared in his sixth cup final for Al-Ahli but this time in the Gulf Club Champions Cup against Saudi side Al-Nassr. Al-Ahli defeated Al-Nassr 3–0 on aggregate to win their third title. On 8 May 2009, Taiseer joined Qatar SC on loan to participate in the Emir Cup, he made two appearances and scored once as his team were eliminated in the semi-finals once again.

On 9 October 2009, Taiseer signed a new four-year contract with Al-Ahli. On 24 June 2011, Taiseer helped Al-Ahli win their eleventh King Cup title after defeating Al-Ittihad 4–2 on penalties. During the 2011–12 and 2012–13 season, Taiseer played an instrumental role in leading Al-Ahli to the 2012 AFC Champions League Final and also finishing as runners-up in the 2011–12 Saudi Professional League. He also started the 2012 King Cup Final win against Al-Nassr.

Following the departure of Mohammad Massad in January 2013, Taiseer was named as club captain. On 6 December 2013, Taiseer renewed his contract with Al-Ahli for another four years. On 13 February 2015, Taiseer captained Al-Ahli in the 2–1 win against Al-Hilal in the 2015 Saudi Crown Prince Cup Final. During the 2015–16 season, Taiseer captained Al-Ahli to their first league title since the 1983–84 season.

=== Loan to Al-Wehda ===
On 19 August 2018, Taiseer was loaned to fellow Pro League Al-Wehda until the end of the 2018–19 season. His loan was ended early on 26 January 2019 and Taiseer returned to Al-Ahli.

=== Al-Nasr ===
On 4 September 2019, Taiseer joined Kuwait Premier League side Al-Nasr. He became the first Saudi player since Jamal Farhan to play in the Kuwait Premier League. On 2 July 2020, Al-Nasr ended Taiseer's contract early due to the COVID-19 pandemic in Kuwait.

== International career ==
=== 2007 AFC Asian Cup ===
Taiseer represented Saudi Arabia at the 2007 AFC Asian Cup and scored two goals against Bahrain, as his team reached the final before losing to Iraq.

=== 19th Arabian Gulf Cup ===
He also participated in the 19th Arabian Gulf Cup in 2009 and reached the final against Oman. However, he was the only player to miss in the decisive penalty shoot-out after the match ended 0-0, ultimately giving Oman the trophy after a 6-5 win.

=== 2011 AFC Asian Cup ===
Taiseer scored a goal for Saudi Arabia against Syria at the 2011 AFC Asian Cup, but it wasn't enough as his team lost 2-1 and exited the tournament from the group stage.

=== 2015 AFC Asian Cup ===
Taiseer scored in Saudi Arabia's 2-1 win against Iraq to help them qualify for the 2015 AFC Asian Cup.

=== 2018 World Cup ===
On 19 December 2017, after Saudi Arabia qualified for the 2018 FIFA World Cup, he announced his intentions to retire after the end of the tournament. He made 2 appearances in the World Cup before his tournament ended prematurely due to injury.

== Style of play ==
Taiseer has been described as intelligent and technically gifted with excellent work ethic. He is known for his long-range shooting, dribbling and passing. He played in almost all midfield positions, most notably as an attacking midfielder, a winger or a central midfielder.

== Personal life ==
Taiseer's older brother Misfer was also a footballer who played for Hajer and Al-Ahli. Taiseer is married to a Lebanese woman. He belongs to the Shia minority of Saudi Arabia and helped build a Shia mosque in his hometown.

== Career statistics ==
=== Club ===
As of 1 May 2020.

Appearances and goals by club, season and competition
Club	Season	League			National Cup (Note: Includes King Cup, Emir of Qatar Cup and Kuwait Emir Cup)		League Cup (Note: Includes Saudi Crown Prince Cup, Qatar Crown Prince Cup and Kuwait Crown Prince Cup)		Asia		Arab/Gulf		Other		Total	
Club	Season	Division	Apps	Goals	Apps	Goals	Apps	Goals	Apps	Goals	Apps	Goals	Apps	Goals	Apps	Goals
Al-Ahli	2002–03	Saudi Premier League	2	0	—		0	0	—		0	0	1 (Note: Appearances in Saudi Federation Cup)	0	3	0
Al-Ahli	2003–04	Saudi Premier League	14	0	—		4	0	—		11	0	4	0	33	0
Al-Ahli	2004–05	Saudi Premier League	11	1	—		1	0	4	1	12	0	0	0	28	2
Al-Ahli	2005–06	Saudi Premier League	15	1	—		5	3	—		—		2	1	22	5
Al-Ahli	2006–07	Saudi Premier League	17	2	—		5	2	—		10	0	2	0	34	4
Al-Ahli	2007–08	Saudi Premier League	18	1	0	0	0	0	1	0	—		2	1	21	2
Al-Ahli	2008–09	Saudi Pro League	19	3	2	0	1	0	—		2	0	—		24	3
Al-Ahli	2009–10	Saudi Pro League	10	0	1	0	3	0	3	0	—		—		17	0
Al-Ahli	2010–11	Saudi Pro League	21	3	5	0	2	0	—		—		—		28	3
Al-Ahli	2011–12	Saudi Pro League	25	9	4	1	1	1	11	2	—		—		41	13
Al-Ahli	2012–13	Saudi Pro League	22	5	5	0	1	1	10	1	—		—		38	7
Al-Ahli	2013–14	Saudi Pro League	24	7	5	1	3	1	—		—		—		32	9
Al-Ahli	2014–15	Saudi Pro League	25	3	1	0	5	0	8	3	—		—		39	6
Al-Ahli	2015–16	Saudi Pro League	25	2	4	0	4	1	4	0	—		—		37	3
Al-Ahli	2016–17	Saudi Pro League	23	3	5	0	2	0	9	1	—		1 (Note: Appearances in Saudi Super Cup)	0	40	4
Al-Ahli	2017–18	Saudi Pro League	11	1	1	0	—		5	1	—		—		17	2
Al-Ahli	2018–19	Saudi Pro League	8	1	0	0	—		3	0	0	0	—		11	1
Al-Ahli	Total		290	42	33	2	37	9	58	9	35	0	12	2	465	64
Al-Gharafa (loan)	2006–07	Qatar Stars League	0	0	2	1	0	0	—		—		—		2	1
Qatar (loan)	2008–09	Qatar Stars League	0	0	2	1	0	0	—		—		—		2	1
Al-Wehda (loan)	2018–19	Saudi Pro League	8	1	1	0	—		—		—		—		9	1
Al-Nasr	2019–20	Kuwait Premier League	10	1	1	0	2	0	—		—		3 (Note: Appearances in Kuwait Federation Cup)	2	16	3
Career total			308	44	39	4	39	9	58	9	35	0	15	4	494	70

=== International ===
Statistics accurate as of match played 20 June 2018.

Saudi Arabia
Year	Apps	Goals
2004	1	0
2005	13	0
2006	4	0
2007	14	5
2008	3	0
2009	16	1
2010	9	1
2011	13	1
2012	4	0
2013	9	1
2014	11	1
2015	9	3
2016	8	4
2017	10	0
2018	10	2
Total	134	19

=== International goals ===
Scores and results list Saudi Arabia's goal tally first.

#	Date	Venue	Opponent	Score	Result	Competition
1.	27 June 2007	National Stadium, Kallang, Singapore	Singapore	2–0	2–1	Friendly
2.	18 July 2007	Gelora Sriwijaya Stadium, Palembang, Indonesia	Bahrain	3–0	4–0	2007 AFC Asian Cup
3.	18 July 2007	Gelora Sriwijaya Stadium, Palembang, Indonesia	Bahrain	4–0	4–0	2007 AFC Asian Cup
4.	2 November 2007	King Fahd International Stadium, Riyadh, Saudi Arabia	Namibia	1–0	1–0	Friendly
5.	9 November 2007	Prince Abdullah Al Faisal Stadium, Jeddah, Saudi Arabia	Estonia	1–0	2–0	Friendly
6.	26 May 2009	Jassim Bin Hamad Stadium, Doha, Qatar	Qatar	1–0	1–2	Friendly
7.	9 October 2010	Prince Abdullah Al Faisal Stadium, Jeddah, Saudi Arabia	Uzbekistan	3–0	4–0	Friendly
8.	9 January 2011	Ahmed bin Ali Stadium, Al Rayyan, Qatar	Syria	1–1	1–2	2011 AFC Asian Cup
9.	15 November 2013	Prince Mohamed bin Fahd Stadium, Dammam, Saudi Arabia	Iraq	1–0	2–1	2015 AFC Asian Cup qualification
10.	8 September 2014	Craven Cottage, London, England	Australia	2–3	2–3	Friendly
11.	3 September 2015	King Abdullah Sports City, Jeddah, Saudi Arabia	Timor-Leste	5–0	7–0	2018 FIFA World Cup qualification
12.	8 September 2015	Shah Alam Stadium, Shah Alam, Malaysia	Malaysia	1–1	3–0 (Note: Malaysia's home match was awarded as a 3–0 win to Saudi Arabia after game was abandoned due to crowd violence.)	2018 FIFA World Cup qualification
13.	17 November 2015	National Stadium, Dili, East Timor	Timor-Leste	7–0	10–0	2018 FIFA World Cup qualification
14.	24 March 2016	King Abdullah Sports City, Jeddah, Saudi Arabia	Malaysia	2–0	2–0	2018 FIFA World Cup qualification
15.	29 March 2016	Zayed Sports City Stadium, Abu Dhabi, United Arab Emirates	United Arab Emirates	1–0	1–1	2018 FIFA World Cup qualification
16.	24 August 2016	Grand Hamad Stadium, Doha, Qatar	Laos	1–0	4–0	Friendly
17.	6 October 2016	King Abdullah Sports City, Jeddah, Saudi Arabia	Australia	1–0	2–2	2018 FIFA World Cup qualification
18.	26 February 2018	King Abdullah Sports City, Jeddah, Saudi Arabia	Moldova	2–0	3–0	Friendly
19.	8 June 2018	BayArena, Leverkusen, Germany	Germany	1–2	1–2	Friendly

== Honours ==
=== Club ===
Al-Ahli

- Saudi Professional League: 2015–16
- King Cup: 2011, 2012, 2016
- Crown Prince Cup: 2001/02, 2006–07, 2014–15
- Saudi Federation Cup: 2001, 2002, 2007
- Arab Club Champions Cup: 2003
- Saudi Super Cup: 2016
- Gulf Club Champions Cup: 2002, 2008
- Friendship Football Tournament: 2001, 2002
- AFC Champions League : Runner-up: 2012

Friendly tournaments

- Al Jazeera International Cup: 2013

National team

- Islamic Games Gold Medal 2005
- Singapore Asian Championship 2007

=== Individual ===
- Saudi Professional League Player of the Season: 2011–12
- Saudi Professional League Best Midfielder: 2011–12
- Al-Ahli Player of the Year: 2011–12
- Entering Centennial Club 2015

numbers and priorities

- The first player to complete 200 matches in the history of the Saudi Professional League.
- He participated with the Saudi Arabia national team in 134 international matches in an international career that lasted for 14 years.
- He participated with Al-Ahli in the Saudi Professional League more than 200 matches, scored 46 goals and assisted 44 goals.
- His contributions to goals with Al-Ahli club reached more than 100 goals, even though he is a midfielder.
- Al-Ahli's third top scorer in the AFC Champions League, scoring 9 goals.
- assisted the Saudi Arabia national team in the 2018 World Cup qualifiers with 8 goals and contributed 14 goals in total (The most).
- Al-Ahli's top scorer for Saudi Arabia national players in the AFC Champions League.
- Al-Ahli's top scorer for Saudi Arabia national players in the Saudi Professional League.

== See also ==
- List of men's footballers with 100 or more international caps
