= Abdulmutalib Al-Traidi =

Saudi Arabian footballer

Personal information
- Full name: Abdulmutalib Saleh Al-Traidi
- Date of birth: 15 May 1982 (age 44)
- Place of birth: Saudi Arabia
- Position: Right back

Youth career
- Al-Khuwaildiyah

Senior career*
Years	Team	Apps	(Gls)
2003–2005	Al-Khuwaildiyah		
2005–2008	Al-Qadisiyah		
2008–2012	Ittihad FC		
2010–2012	Ettifaq FC	41	(2)
2012–2013	Ittihad FC	14	(0)
2013–2014	Ettifaq FC	6	(0)
2014	Al Khaleej	5	(0)
2015	Al-Fateh	3	(0)
2015–2016	Al Safa FC		
2016–2018	Al-Hedaya		
2018–2020	Al-Salam		
2021	Al Noor		
- * Club domestic league appearances and goals as of 16 March 2013

Abdulmutalib Al-Traidi is a Saudi Arabian footballer who plays as a right back.
