= Abdulaziz Hamsal =

Saudi Arabian footballer

Personal information
- Full name: Abdulaziz Hamsal
- Date of birth: 1 March 1987 (age 39)
- Place of birth: Najran, Saudi Arabia
- Height: 1.55 m (5 ft 1 in)
- Positions: Full back; winger

Senior career*
Years	Team	Apps	(Gls)
2006–2018	Najran SC		
2018–2019	Al-Akhdoud		
2019–2020	Bisha		
2020–2021	Al-Jazira		
2021–2022	Mudhar		
- * Club domestic league appearances and goals as of 3 June 2014

Abdulaziz Hamsal (born March 1, 1987) is a full back or winger. He is known for being the shortest football player in the video game series FIFA.
