= Patrick Gbala =

Ivorian footballer

Personal information
- Full name: Jean Patrick Gbala
- Date of birth: June 12, 1993 (age 33)
- Place of birth: Ouragahio, Ivory Coast
- Height: 1.80 m (5 ft 11 in)
- Position: Midfielder

Senior career*
Years	Team	Apps	(Gls)
2014–2015	US Monastir	15	(0)
2015–2017	Al-Fateh SC	20	(0)
2017–2019	US Monastir	14	(0)
2019	Jeddah		
2022–2023	Wej		
- * Club domestic league appearances and goals as of 21:32, 23 December 2017 (UTC)

Patrick Gbala born June 12, 1993) is an Ivorian football player who plays as a midfielder. He played in the Saudi Professional League for Al-Fateh SC and in the Tunisian Ligue Professionnelle 1 for US Monastir.
