= Saleh Al-Ghwinem =

Saudi Arabian footballer

Personal information
- Full name: Saleh Abdullah Al-Ghwinem
- Date of birth: May 31, 1986 (age 40)
- Place of birth: Khobar, Saudi Arabia
- Position: Winger

Youth career
- Al-Qadisiyah

Senior career*
Years	Team	Apps	(Gls)
2005–2015	Al-Qadisiyah		
2008–2009	→ Al-Ittihad (loan)	7	(0)
2010–2011	→ Al-Raed (loan)	15	(1)
2012	→ Al-Hazm (loan)		
2015–2016	Al-Diriyah		
2016–2018	Al-Thoqbah		
- * Club domestic league appearances and goals

Saleh Al-Ghwinem (Arabic: صالح الغوينم; born March 31, 1986) is a Saudi football player who plays as a winger.
