= Al-Khuwaildiyah FC =

Association football club in Saudi Arabia

Al-Khuwaildiyah
- Full name: Al-Khuwaildiyah FC
- Founded: 1977
- Ground: Prince Nayef bin Abdulaziz Stadium; Qatif, Saudi Arabia
- Chairman: ?
- Manager: ?
- League: Saudi Fourth Division
Home colours	Away colours

Al-Khuwaildiyah FC is a Saudi Arabian football (soccer) team in Sanabes, Qatif City that currently plays in the Saudi Fourth Division.

== Stadium ==
Prince Nayef bin Abdulaziz Stadium
Qatif, Saudi Arabia

== See also ==
- List of football clubs in Saudi Arabia
