= Mutab Sharahili =

Saudi Arabian footballer

Personal information
- Full name: Mutab Ahmed Sharahili
- Date of birth: November 19, 1992 (age 33)
- Place of birth: Riyadh, Saudi Arabia
- Height: 1.95 m (6 ft 5 in)
- Position: Goalkeeper

Team information
- Current team: Al-Diriyah

Youth career
- –2014: Al-Nassr

Senior career*
Years	Team	Apps	(Gls)
2014–2017	Al-Nassr	7	(0)
2016–2017	→ Al-Raed (loan)	14	(0)
2017–2018	Al-Raed	19	(0)
2018–2019	Damac	1	(0)
2019–2020	Hetten	25	(0)
2020–2022	Al-Khaleej	66	(0)
2022–2023	Al-Arabi	24	(0)
2023–2024	Al-Adalah	7	(0)
2024–	Al-Diriyah	0	(0)
2025–2026	→ Al-Jandal (loan)	25	(0)
- * Club domestic league appearances and goals as of 25 August 2026

Mutab Sharahili (Arabic: متعب شراحيلي; born 19 November 1992) is a Saudi Arabian football goalkeeper who plays for Saudi Pro League club Al-Diriyah.

== Career ==
At the club level, Mutab Sharahili began his career playing for Al-Nassr. He was promoted to the first team during the 2014–15 season.

On 3 July 2022, Sharahili joined First Division side Al-Arabi.

On 10 June 2023, Sharahili joined Al-Adalah.

On 18 July 2024, Sharahili joined Al-Diriyah.

On 6 September 2025, Sharahili joined Al-Jandal on loan.

== Honours ==
=== Clubs ===
Al-Nassr

- Saudi Professional League 2014–15

Damac

- First Division runner-up: 2018–19

Al-Khaleej

- First Division: 2021–22

Al-Diriyah

- Second Division: 2024–25
