= Majed Al-Hazzani =

Saudi footballer

Personal information
- Full name: Majed Al-Hazzani
- Date of birth: January 23, 1983 (age 43)
- Place of birth: Mecca, Saudi Arabia
- Height: 1.70 m (5 ft 7 in)
- Position: Midfielder

Senior career*
Years	Team	Apps	(Gls)
2003–2016	Al-Wahda		
- * Club domestic league appearances and goals

Majed Al-Hazzani [ماجد الهزاني in Arabic] (born 23 January 1983) is a Saudi football player. He currently plays for Al-Wahda FC.
