= Mohammad Massad =

Saudi Arabian footballer

Personal information
- Full name: Mohammad Massad Al-Muwallad
- Date of birth: 17 February 1983 (age 43)
- Place of birth: Jeddah, Saudi Arabia
- Height: 1.76 m (5 ft 9 1/2 in)
- Position: Midfielder

Youth career
- 1999-2001: Al-Ahli

Senior career*
| Years | Team | Apps | (Gls) |
| 2001–2014 | Al-Ahli | 200 | (21) |
| 2013 | → Al-Hilal (loan) | 0 | (0) |

International career^{‡}
| 2002–2011 | Saudi Arabia | 10 | (0) |
- * Club domestic league appearances and goals as of 14 June 2006 ‡ National team caps and goals as of 23 June 2006

Mohammad Massad Al-Muwallad (Arabic: محمد مسعد المولد; born 17 February 1983) is a Saudi Arabian former football player who last played as a midfielder for Al-Hilal on loan from Al Ahli. He could also play in central or right or left defense. He is the brother of former notable player Khalid Massad. He played for the Saudi Arabia national team and was called up to the squad to participate in the 2006 FIFA World Cup.

== Achievements ==
=== Al-Ahli ===
- Crown Prince Cup: 2002, 2007.
- Saudi Federation cup: 2001, 2002.
- Saudi Champions Cup: 2011, 2012.
- Arab Champions League: 2003.
- GCC Club Cup: 2002.

=== National team career statistics ===
- 16th Arabian Gulf Cup: Champion
- 2006 FIFA World Cup: Group Stage
- 2011 AFC Asian Cup: Group Stage
