= 2025 Newell's Old Boys season =

Newell's Old Boys
2025 season
- Chairman: Ignacio Astore
- Manager: Mariano Soso (until 17 February); Cristian Fabbiani (from 19 February)
- Stadium: Estadio Marcelo Bielsa
- Torneo Apertura: 11th
- Torneo Clausura: Pre-season
- Copa Argentina: Round of 32
- Average home league attendance: 42,000
Home colours	Away colours	Third colours

The 2025 season is the 121st for Club Atlético Newell's Old Boys and their 11th consecutive season in the Primera División. The club will also participate in the Copa Argentina.

== Squad ==
=== Current squad ===
As of 22 July 2025

Note: Flags indicate national team as defined under FIFA eligibility rules; some limited exceptions apply. Players may hold more than one non-FIFA nationality.

No.	Pos.	Nation	Player
3	DF	ARG	Luca Sosa (on loan from Barcelona SC)
4	DF	ARG	Alejo Montero
5	MF	ARG	Éver Banega (captain)
6	DF	COL	Jherson Mosquera
9	FW	ARG	Darío Benedetto
12	GK	ARG	Lucas Hoyos
14	MF	URU	Martín Fernández
15	DF	ARG	Martín Luciano
16	DF	PAR	Saúl Salcedo
17	MF	ARG	Valentino Acuña
18	DF	ARG	Víctor Cuesta
19	DF	ARG	Brian Calderara
20	MF	ARG	Gonzalo Maroni (on loan from Boca Juniors)
21	FW	ARG	Luciano Herrera (on loan from Defensa y Justicia)
23	DF	ARG	Ángelo Martino

No.	Pos.	Nation	Player
24	FW	ARG	Mateo Silvetti
25	DF	ARG	Alejo Tabares (on loan from All Boys)
26	MF	ARG	Juan Ignacio Méndez
27	MF	ARG	Luca Regiardo
28	MF	ARG	Gaspar Iñíguez
29	DF	ARG	Fabián Noguera
30	GK	ARG	Williams Barlasina
32	FW	PAR	Carlos González
34	MF	ARG	David Sotelo
37	DF	ARG	Luciano Lollo
38	FW	ARG	Giovani Chiaverano
43	MF	ARG	Lisandro Montenegro
—	MF	ARG	Guillermo Balzi
—	FW	ARG	Juan Manuel García
—	FW	ARG	Genaro Rossi

=== Transfers In ===
Pos.	Player	Transferred from	Fee	Date	Source
DF	(Argentina) Luca Sosa	(Ecuador) Barcelona SC	Loan	8 January 2025	
GK	(Costa Rica) Keylor Navas	Unattached	Free	21 January 2025	
FW	(Argentina) Darío Benedetto	(Paraguay) Olimpia	Free	12 June 2025	
MF	(Colombia) Jherson Mosquera	(Colombia) Independiente Medellín	Loan return	30 June 2025	
MF	(Uruguay) Martín Fernández	(Uruguay) Boston River	Undisclosed	1 July 2025	
MF	(Argentina) Gaspar Iñíguez	Unattached	Free	6 July 2025	
DF	(Argentina) Fabián Noguera	(Saudi Arabia) Abha	Free	12 July 2025	
GK	(Paraguay) Juan Espínola	(Paraguay) Olimpia	Undisclosed	24 July 2025	
MF	(Argentina) Franco Orozco	(Argentina) Lanús	Loan	24 July 2025	

=== Transfers Out ===
Pos.	Player	Transferred from	Fee	Date	Source
FW	(Uruguay) Ignacio Ramírez	(Brazil) Sport Recife	Loan	12 July 2025	
GK	(Argentina) Josué Reinatti	(Argentina) Defensa y Justicia	Loan	6 July 2025	
MF	(Paraguay) Fernando Cardozo	(Paraguay) Olimpia	Loan	16 July 2025	
DF	(Argentina) Tomás Jacob	(Mexico) Necaxa	€1,540,000	15 July 2025	
GK	(Costa Rica) Keylor Navas	(Mexico) Pumas UNAM	€1,600,000	21 July 2025	
MF	(Argentina) Juan Ignacio Méndez	(Argentina) Instituto	Loan	24 July 2025	
FW	(Argentina) Mateo Silvetti	(United States) Inter Miami	Undisclosed	22 August 2025	

== Friendlies ==
3 July 2025 International Football Cup SF	Mazatlán (Mexico)	1–0	(Argentina) Newell's Old Boys	Boca del Río
18:10 UTC−6	Benedetti 64'			Stadium: Estadio Luis "Pirata" Fuente

6 July 2025 International Football Cup TP	Newell's Old Boys (Argentina)	1–1 (1–3 p)	(Colombia) Once Caldas	Boca del Río, Mexico
16:10 UTC−6	Gigena 65'		Moreno 78' (pen.)	Stadium: Estadio Luis "Pirata" Fuente

== Competitions ==
=== Overall record ===
Competition	First match	Last match	Starting round	Record							
Competition	First match	Last match	Starting round	Pld	W	D	L	GF	GA	GD	Win %
Torneo Apertura	23 January 2025		Matchday 1	13	4	3	6	9	13	−4	30.77
Torneo Clausura				0	0	0	0	0	0	+0	—
Copa Argentina	3 April 2025		Round of 64	1	0	1	0	0	0	+0	0.00
Total				14	4	4	6	9	13	−4	28.57

Source: Competitions

=== Primera División ===
==== Torneo Apertura ====
===== League table =====
Pos	Team	Pld	W	D	L	GF	GA	GD	Pts	Qualification
7	Barracas Central	16	7	5	4	20	18	+2	26	Advance to round of 16
8	Estudiantes (LP)	16	5	6	5	18	19	−1	21	Advance to round of 16
9	Newell's Old Boys	16	5	4	7	12	15	−3	19	
10	Defensa y Justicia	16	5	4	7	18	22	−4	19	
11	Central Córdoba (SdE)	16	5	3	8	21	22	−1	18	

Source: AFA

===== Results by round =====
Round	1	2	3	4	5	6	7	8	9	10	11	12	13
Ground	H	A	H	A	H	H	A	A	H	A	H	A	H
Result	L	L	W	L	L	L	L	W	D	D	W	W	D
Position													

A = Away; H = Home; W = Win; D = Draw; L = Loss

===== Matches =====
23 January 2025 1	Newell's Old Boys	0–1	Independiente Rivadavia	Rosario
21:30 UTC−3			Peinipil 43'	Stadium: Estadio Marcelo Bielsa

27 January 2025 2	Banfield	3–0	Newell's Old Boys	Banfield
20:00 UTC−3	Nasif 30' (pen.), 55'; Alaniz 45+1'			Stadium: Estadio Florencio Sola

2 February 2025 3	Newell's Old Boys	1–0	Aldosivi	Rosario
19:15 UTC−3	Maroni 28'			Stadium: Estadio Marcelo Bielsa

7 February 2025 4	Central Córdoba	2–0	Newell's Old Boys	Santiago del Estero
20:00 UTC−3	Heredia 36'; Florentín 90+7'	Report		Stadium: Estadio Único Madre de Ciudades

12 February 2025 5	Newell's Old Boys	0–1	Defensa y Justicia	Rosario
19:15 UTC−3		Report	Miritello 90+3'	Stadium: Estadio Marcelo Bielsa

16 February 2025 6	Newell's Old Boys	1–2	Rosario Central	Rosario
17:00 UTC−3	Éver Banega 87'		Duarte 16'; Campaz 63'	Stadium: Estadio Marcelo Bielsa

24 February 2025 7	Barracas Central	2–0	Newell's Old Boys	Sarandí
17:00 UTC−3	Candia 2'; Duarte 90+1'			Stadium: Estadio Julio Humberto Grondona

3 March 2025 8	Atlético Tucumán	1–2	Newell's Old Boys	Tucumán
21:00 UTC−3	Laméndola 41'		Silvetti 4', 45+1'	Stadium: Estadio Monumental José Fierro

9 March 2025 9	Newell's Old Boys	0–0	Belgrano	Rosario
21:30 UTC−3				Stadium: Estadio Marcelo Bielsa

15 March 2025 10	Estudiantes	1–1	Newell's Old Boys	La Plata
18:30 UTC−3	Palacios 26'		Herrera 45+1'	Stadium: Estadio Jorge Luis Hirschi

30 March 2025 11	Newell's Old Boys	2–0	Boca Juniors	Rosario
19:30 UTC−3	Herrera 4'; Lollo 45+2'	Report		Stadium: Estadio Marcelo Bielsa; Referee: Darío Herrera

7 April 2025 12	Tigre	0–2	Newell's Old Boys	Victoria
20:00 UTC−3			Cuesta 13'; Herrera 74'	Stadium: Estadio José Dellagiovanna

11 April 2025 13	Newell's Old Boys	0–0	Argentinos Juniors	Rosario
21:00 UTC−3				Stadium: Estadio Marcelo Bielsa

18 April 2025 14	Unión	1–1	Newell's Old Boys	Santa Fe
21:30 UTC−3	Gamba 11'	Report	González 16'	Stadium: Estadio 15 de Abril

29 April 2025 15	Newell's Old Boys	2–0	Huracán	Rosario
--:-- UTC−3	Acuña 43'; Lollo 81'	Report		Stadium: Estadio Marcelo Bielsa

2 May 2025 16	Racing	1–0	Newell's Old Boys	Avellaneda
15:30 UTC−3	Salcedo 88' (o.g.)	Report		Stadium: El Cilindro

==== Torneo Clausura ====
===== League table =====
Pos	Team	Pld	W	D	L	GF	GA	GD	Pts
11	Huracán	16	5	5	6	10	15	−5	20
12	Defensa y Justicia	16	5	4	7	14	19	−5	19
13	Aldosivi	16	5	3	8	13	18	−5	18
14	Independiente Rivadavia	16	3	7	6	14	17	−3	16
15	Newell's Old Boys	16	3	5	8	13	23	−10	14

Source: AFA

===== Matches =====
13 July 2025 1	Independiente Rivadavia	1–2	Newell's Old Boys	Mendoza
21:30 UTC−3	Studer 31'	Report	González 71'; Banega 88'	Stadium: Estadio Bautista Gargantini

20 July 2025 2	Newell's Old Boys	1–2	Banfield	Rosario
16:45 UTC−3	Banega 59'	Report	Auzmendi 44'; Méndez 73'	Stadium: Estadio Marcelo Bielsa

26 July 2025 3	Aldosivi	0–0	Newell's Old Boys	Mar del Plata
14:30 UTC−3		Report		Stadium: Estadio José María Minella

8 August 2025 4	Newell's Old Boys	1–1	Central Córdoba	Rosario
21:00 UTC−3	Maroni 85'	Report	Verón 90'	Stadium: Estadio Marcelo Bielsa

17 August 2025 5	Defensa y Justicia	1–1	Newell's Old Boys	Gobernador Costa
14:00 UTC−3	Pérez 38'	Report	Mosquera 19'	Stadium: Estadio Norberto "Tito" Tomaghello

23 August 2025 6	Rosario Central	1–0	Newell's Old Boys	Rosario
17:30 UTC−3	Di María 82'	Report		Stadium: Estadio Gigante de Arroyito

29 August 2025 7	Newell's Old Boys	1–2	Barracas Central	Rosario
19:00 UTC−3	González 20'	Report	Bruera 45+2'; Tapia 58'	Stadium: Estadio Marcelo Bielsa

30 September 2025 10	Newell's Old Boys	1–1	Estudiantes	Rosario
19:00 UTC−3	Lollo 90+1'	Report	Meza 75'	Stadium: Estadio Marcelo Bielsa

=== Copa Argentina ===
3 April 2025 Round of 64	Newell's Old Boys	0–0 (5–4 p)	Kimberley	Florida
21:10		Report		Stadium: Ciudad de Vicente López; Referee: Pablo Echavarría
	Penalties
	Banega (penalty scored); González (penalty missed); Sotelo (penalty scored); Cuesta (penalty scored); García (penalty scored); Cardozo (penalty scored)		(penalty scored) Bacigalupe; (penalty scored) Loscalzo; (penalty scored) Mantia; (penalty missed) Pereyra; (penalty scored) Rinaldi; (penalty missed) S. Vázquez

22 May 2025 Round of 32	Defensa y Justicia	0–2	Newell's Old Boys	San Nicolás de los Arroyos
21:10		Report	Herrera 38'; Maroni 47'	Stadium: Único de San Nicolás; Referee: Pablo Dóvalo

13 August 2025 Round of 16	Atlético Tucumán	2–3	Newell's Old Boys	Salta
19:30	Brizuela 31'; Coronel 36'	Report	Lollo 11'; Maroni 39'; González 60'	Stadium: Padre Martearena; Referee: Ariel Penel

17 September 2025 Quarter-finals	Newell's Old Boys	1–3	Belgrano	Villa Mercedes
18:00	González 8'	Report	Jara 23', 77'; L. López 50'	Stadium: Único de Villa Mercedes; Referee: Leandro Rey Hilfer
