= 2023–24 Abha Club season =

Abha
2023–24 season
- President: Ahmed Al-Hodithy
- Manager: Czesław Michniewicz (until 1 October); Yousef Al Mannai (from 9 October until 17 December); Pitso Mosimane (from 26 January)
- Stadium: Prince Sultan bin Abdul Aziz Stadium
- Pro League: 16th (relegated)
- King Cup: Quarter-finals (knocked out by Al-Khaleej)
- Top goalscorer: League: Grzegorz Krychowiak (9); All: Grzegorz Krychowiak (9)
- Highest home attendance: 12,079 (vs. Al-Nassr, 2 April 2024)
- Lowest home attendance: 210 (vs. Al-Riyadh, 30 September 2023)
- Average home league attendance: 3,056
- All statistics correct as of 27 May 2024.

The 2023–24 season was Abha's seventh non-consecutive season in the Pro League and their 58th season in existence. The club participated in the Pro League and the King Cup.

The season covers the period from 1 July 2023 to 30 June 2024.

== Players ==
=== Squad information ===
As of 1 February 2024

Note: Flags indicate national team as defined under FIFA eligibility rules; some limited exceptions apply. Players may hold more than one non-FIFA nationality.

No.	Pos.	Nation	Player
1	GK	KSA	Abdullah Al-Shammeri
3	DF	KSA	Mohammad Naji
5	MF	POL	Grzegorz Krychowiak
8	MF	SRB	Uroš Matić
9	FW	KSA	Hassan Al-Ali
10	MF	TUN	Saad Bguir (captain)
11	FW	GUI	François Kamano
12	GK	KSA	Abdulrahman Al-Bouq
13	DF	KSA	Mohammed Al-Kunaydiri
14	MF	KSA	Fahad Al-Jumayah
15	DF	KSA	Ibrahim Al-Zubaidi (on loan from Al-Ahli)
16	GK	ROU	Ciprian Tătărușanu
17	DF	KSA	Saleh Al-Qumayzi
18	DF	ARG	Fabián Noguera
19	FW	MNE	Luka Đorđević
21	MF	KSA	Zakaria Sami

No.	Pos.	Nation	Player
22	DF	KSA	Yousef Al Aqeel
23	MF	KSA	Nasser Al-Omran
24	DF	KSA	Mohammed Al-Oufi
25	MF	KSA	Abdulrahman Al-Alwi
26	DF	COD	Marcel Tisserand (on loan from Al-Ettifaq)
27	MF	KSA	Hassan Al-Qayd
29	MF	KSA	Mohammed Al-Qahtani
30	DF	KSA	Ziyad Al-Sahafi
32	DF	KSA	Sulaiman Asiri
33	GK	KSA	Mansour Jawhar
71	FW	ERI	Ahmed Abdu Jaber
77	FW	KSA	Meshal Al-Mutairi
80	MF	KSA	Abdulelah Al-Shammeri
88	MF	KSA	Saad Al-Selouli
97	MF	KSA	Waseem Al-Shehri

== Transfers and loans ==
=== Transfers in ===
Entry date	Position	No.	Player	From club	Fee	Ref.
30 June 2023	FW	90	(Saudi Arabia) Omar Al-Ruwaili	(Saudi Arabia) Al-Riyadh	End of loan	
1 July 2023	FW	77	(Saudi Arabia) Meshal Al-Mutairi	(Saudi Arabia) Ohod	Free	
13 July 2023	DF	3	(Saudi Arabia) Mohammad Naji	(Saudi Arabia) Al-Batin	Free	
17 July 2023	DF	17	(Saudi Arabia) Saleh Al-Qumayzi	(Saudi Arabia) Al-Faisaly	Free	
17 July 2023	DF	22	(Saudi Arabia) Yousef Al Aqeel	(Saudi Arabia) Najran	Free	
28 July 2023	DF	24	(Saudi Arabia) Mohammed Al-Oufi	(Saudi Arabia) Al-Ittihad	Free	
30 July 2023	MF	5	(Poland) Grzegorz Krychowiak	(Russia) Krasnodar	Free	
3 August 2023	FW	11	(Guinea) François Kamano	(Russia) Lokomotiv Moscow	Free	
10 August 2023	GK	16	(Romania) Ciprian Tătărușanu	(Italy) AC Milan	Free	
11 August 2023	DF	18	(Argentina) Fabián Noguera	(Uruguay) Nacional	$300,000	
21 August 2023	FW	71	(Eritrea) Ahmed Abdu Jaber	(Saudi Arabia) Al-Shabab	Free	
24 August 2023	FW	7	(Cameroon) Karl Toko Ekambi	(France) Lyon	$1,800,000	
7 September 2023	DF	30	(Saudi Arabia) Ziyad Al-Sahafi	(Saudi Arabia) Al-Ittihad	Free	
7 September 2023	MF	80	(Saudi Arabia) Abdulelah Al-Shammeri	(Saudi Arabia) Al-Shabab	Undisclosed	
7 September 2023	FW	9	(Saudi Arabia) Hassan Al-Ali	(Saudi Arabia) Al-Ahli	$533,000	
11 February 2024	FW	19	(Montenegro) Luka Đorđević	(Russia) Sochi	Free	

=== Loans in ===
Start date	End date	Position	No.	Player	From club	Fee	Ref.
30 January 2024	End of season	DF	15	(Saudi Arabia) Ibrahim Al-Zubaidi	(Saudi Arabia) Al-Ahli	None	
30 January 2024	End of season	DF	26	(Democratic Republic of the Congo) Marcel Tisserand	(Saudi Arabia) Al-Ettifaq	None	

=== Transfers out ===
Exit date	Position	No.	Player	To club	Fee	Ref.
30 June 2023	MF	11	(Mozambique) Luís Miquissone	(Egypt) Al-Ahly	End of loan	
30 June 2023	FW	9	(Saudi Arabia) Abdulfattah Adam	(Saudi Arabia) Al-Nassr	End of loan	
1 July 2023	DF	39	(Saudi Arabia) Saeed Al Hamsal	(Saudi Arabia) Al-Khaleej	Free	
13 July 2023	MF	26	(Saudi Arabia) Musab Habkor	(Saudi Arabia) Al-Qaisumah	Free	
22 July 2023	MF	7	(Saudi Arabia) Saleh Al-Amri	(Saudi Arabia) Al-Ittihad	$2,134,000	
1 August 2023	DF	3	(Saudi Arabia) Abdullah Al-Zori	(Saudi Arabia) Al-Qadsiah	Free	
12 August 2023	MF	15	(Saudi Arabia) Mutair Al-Zahrani	(Saudi Arabia) Hajer	Free	
16 August 2023	DF	19	(Morocco) Amine Atouchi	(Saudi Arabia) Al-Batin	Free	
21 August 2023	MF	64	(Saudi Arabia) Nawaf Al-Sadi	(Saudi Arabia) Al-Shabab	Undisclosed	
23 August 2023	MF	34	(Netherlands) Dries Saddiki	(Turkey) Kasımpaşa	Free	
12 September 2023	DF	31	(Saudi Arabia) Sari Amr	(Saudi Arabia) Al-Arabi	Free	
17 September 2023	MF	86	(Saudi Arabia) Aseel Al-Harbi	(Saudi Arabia) Al-Faisaly	Free	
20 September 2023	MF	17	(Algeria) Tayeb Meziani	(Tunisia) Club Africain	Free	
30 January 2024	FW	7	(Cameroon) Karl Toko Ekambi	(Saudi Arabia) Al-Ettifaq	Undisclosed	
31 January 2024	DF	6	(Saudi Arabia) Ahmed Al-Habib	(Saudi Arabia) Al-Orobah	Free	
3 February 2024	DF	4	(Iraq) Saad Natiq	(Iraq) Al-Quwa Al-Jawiya	Free	
10 February 2024	FW	90	(Saudi Arabia) Omar Al-Ruwaili	(Saudi Arabia) Al-Hazem	Undisclosed	

== Pre-season ==
8 July 2023 Friendly	Abha (Saudi Arabia)	1–1	Kuwait SC	İzmit, Turkey
18:00 TRT	Bguir	Report	Ifa	Stadium: Edis Spor Tesisleri

14 July 2023 Friendly	Abha (Saudi Arabia)	1–1	(Iran) Sepahan	İzmit, Turkey
17:30 TRT	Al-Amri	Report	Rezaeian	Stadium: Edis Spor Tesisleri

18 July 2023 Friendly	Abha (Saudi Arabia)	4–7	(Saudi Arabia) Al-Arabi	İzmit, Turkey
18:00 TRT	Al-Ruwaili 5'; Bguir 60', 90'; Al-Amri 90+3'	Report	Mbengue 18', 26', 30', 50', 52'; Miranda 33'; Wahib 63'	Stadium: Edis Spor Tesisleri

19 July 2023 Friendly	Abha (Saudi Arabia)	2–0	(Iran) Gol Gohar Sirjan	İzmit, Turkey
17:00 TRT	Al-Amri 68' (pen.), 75' (pen.)	Report		Stadium: Edis Spor Tesisleri

22 July 2023 Friendly	Abha (Saudi Arabia)	1–2	(Saudi Arabia) Al-Khaleej	İzmit, Turkey
17:30 TRT		Report	Martins; Rebocho	Stadium: Edis Spor Tesisleri

6 August 2023 Friendly	Abha (Saudi Arabia)	0–4	(Saudi Arabia) Al-Okhdood	Abha, Saudi Arabia
18:00 AST		Report	Mostafa; Al-Harthi, Al-Rio	Stadium: Abha Club Stadium

== Competitions ==
=== Overview ===
Competition	Record							
Competition	G	W	D	L	GF	GA	GD	Win %
Pro League	34	9	5	20	38	87	−49	26.47
King Cup	3	2	0	1	4	3	+1	66.67
Total	37	11	5	21	42	90	−48	29.73

Updated to match played 27 May 2024
Source: Competitions

=== Pro League ===
==== League table ====
Pos	Team	Pld	W	D	L	GF	GA	GD	Pts	Qualification or relegation
14	Al-Riyadh	34	8	11	15	33	57	−24	35	
15	Al-Okhdood	34	9	6	19	33	52	−19	33	
16	Abha (R)	34	9	5	20	38	87	−49	32	Relegation to Yelo League
17	Al-Tai (R)	34	8	7	19	34	64	−30	31	Relegation to Yelo League
18	Al-Hazem (R)	34	4	12	18	34	76	−42	24	Relegation to Yelo League

Source: SPL
Rules for classification: 1) Points; 2) Head-to-head points; 3) Head-to-head goal difference; 4) Total goal difference; 5) Total goals scored; 6) Fair-play points
(Note: Head-to-head record is used only after all the matches between the teams in question have been played).
(R) Relegated

==== Results summary ====
Overall								Home						Away					
Pld	W	D	L	GF	GA	GD	Pts	W	D	L	GF	GA	GD	W	D	L	GF	GA	GD
34	9	5	20	38	87	−49	32	9	3	5	22	30	−8	0	2	15	16	57	−41

Last updated: 27 May 2024.
Source: spl.com.sa

==== Results by round ====
Round	1	2	3	4	5	6	7	8	9	10	11	12	13	14	15	16	17	18	19	20	21	22	23	24	25	26	27	28	29	30	31	32	33	34
Ground	H	H	A	H	A	H	A	H	A	A	H	H	A	A	H	A	H	A	A	H	A	H	A	H	A	H	H	A	A	H	H	A	H	A
Result	L	W	L	W	L	L	L	L	D	L	W	W	L	L	L	L	D	L	L	D	L	W	L	W	D	L	W	L	L	W	D	L	W	L
Position	15	11	11	8	10	11	13	16	15	15	15	12	13	15	16	17	16	17	17	17	17	17	17	17	17	17	15	16	17	16	15	17	15	16

Updated to match(es) played on 27 May 2024. Source: spl.com.sa
A = Away; H = Home; W = Win; D = Draw; L = Loss

==== Matches ====
All times are local, AST (UTC+3).

Win Draw Loss Postponed

14 August 2023 1	Abha	1–3	Al-Hilal	Abha
18:00	Bguir 33'	Report	Malcom 31', 55', 77'; Al-Bulaihi (yellow card) 47'	Stadium: Prince Sultan bin Abdul Aziz Stadium; Attendance: 7,079; Referee: Radu Petrescu (Romania)

19 August 2023 2	Abha	1–0	Al-Raed	Abha
18:00	Al-Jumayah (yellow card) 13'; Naji (yellow card) 53'; Al-Ruwaili 57'; Matić (yellow card) 87'	Report	Tavares (yellow card) 17'; Loum (yellow card) 61'	Stadium: Prince Sultan bin Abdul Aziz Stadium; Attendance: 817; Referee: Mohammed Al-Hoaish

25 August 2023 3	Al-Taawoun	1–0	Abha	Buraidah
21:00	Castro 85'; Al-Ghamdi (yellow card) 87'	Report	Al-Jumayah (yellow card) 45+1'; Tătărușanu (yellow card) 84'	Stadium: Al-Taawoun Club Stadium; Attendance: 4,434; Referee: Abdullah Al-Kharboush

28 August 2023 4	Abha	2–1	Al-Fayha	Abha
18:00	Toko Ekambi 36'; Al-Habib (yellow card) 45+7'; Abdu 63'; Al-Qumayzi (yellow card) 86'	Report	Al-Rashidi (yellow card) 61'; Sakala 87' (pen.)	Stadium: Prince Sultan bin Abdul Aziz Stadium; Attendance: 856; Referee: Abdulsamad Bakri

1 September 2023 5	Al-Tai	1–0	Abha	Ha'il
18:00	Al-Shamlan (yellow card) 53'; Al-Sultan (yellow card) 78'; Cordea 83'; Al-Harthi (yellow card) 90+6'	Report	Krychowiak (yellow card) 90+3'	Stadium: Prince Abdul Aziz bin Musa'ed Stadium; Attendance: 1,172; Referee: Faisal Al-Blwi

16 September 2023 6	Abha	1–3	Al-Ettifaq	Abha
15:00	Naji (yellow card) 24'; Kamano (yellow card) 57'; Toko Ekambi 90+8' (pen.)	Report	Dembélé 58'; Al-Shamrani (yellow card) 63'; Quaison 75'; H. Al-Ghamdi 82'	Stadium: Prince Sultan bin Abdul Aziz Stadium; Attendance: 976; Referee: Abdulrahman Al-Sultan

22 September 2023 7	Al-Wehda	4–0	Abha	Mecca
21:00	Goodwin 8'; Al-Hafith 24'; Fajr 65'; Bakshween (yellow card) 73'; Ighalo 88'	Report	Al-Qumayzi (yellow card) 44'	Stadium: King Abdul Aziz Stadium; Attendance: 661; Referee: Raed Al-Zahrani

30 September 2023 8	Abha	0–1	Al-Riyadh	Abha
15:00	Krychowiak (yellow card) 90'	Report	Arslanagić (yellow card) 12'; Gray 84'	Stadium: Prince Sultan bin Abdul Aziz Stadium; Attendance: 210; Referee: Mohammed Al-Daqqash

6 October 2023 9	Al-Nassr	2–2	Abha	Riyadh
18:00	Otávio 3'; Talisca 28'; S. Al-Ghannam (red card) 90+7'	Report	Bguir 36' (pen.); Noguera (yellow card) 53'; Al-Qumayzi (yellow card) 73'; Al-Jumayah (yellow card) 81'; Al-Kunaydiri (yellow card) 84'; Toko Ekambi 90+2'	Stadium: Al-Awwal Park; Attendance: 21,197; Referee: Mario Escobar (Guatemala)

20 October 2023 10	Al-Fateh	4–1	Abha	Al-Hasa
21:00	Batna 21'; Denayer (yellow card) 45+1'; Djaniny 45+4'; Zelarayán 70'; Saâdane (yellow card) 90+2'; Al-Hassan 90+10'	Report	Sami 55'; Al-Habib (yellow card) 73'; Al-Sahafi (yellow card) 90+1'	Stadium: Prince Abdullah bin Jalawi Stadium; Attendance: 9,852; Referee: Mohammed Al-Harbi

28 October 2023 11	Abha	2–1	Al-Shabab	Abha
18:00	Bguir 73'; Krychowiak 82'; Abdulelah S. (yellow card) 90+7'	Report	Santos (yellow card) 68' (yellow-red card) 72'; Al-Muwallad 76'; Saïss (yellow card) 81'	Stadium: Prince Sultan bin Abdul Aziz Stadium; Attendance: 1,378; Referee: Mohammed Al-Hoaish

4 November 2023 12	Abha	3–2	Al-Okhdood	Abha
18:00	Krychowiak 20'; Kvirkvelia 59' (o.g.); Toko Ekambi 69'	Report	Al-Rubaie (yellow card) 23'; Burcă 26'; Al-Shaikh 31'; Al-Harthi (yellow card) 84'; Al Mansour (yellow card) 89'	Stadium: Prince Sultan bin Abdul Aziz Stadium; Attendance: 370; Referee: Sami Al-Jires

10 November 2023 13	Al-Ittihad	4–2	Abha	Jeddah
21:00	Benzema 38' (pen.), 67', 69'; Coronado 54'; Kadesh (yellow card) 65'; Al-Sahafi (yellow card) 90+3'	Report	Natiq (yellow card) 41'; Toko Ekambi 51'; Al-Jumayah 85'	Stadium: Prince Abdullah Al Faisal Stadium; Attendance: 16,835; Referee: Kevin Ortega (Peru)

25 November 2023 14	Damac	4–2	Abha	Abha
21:00	Nkoudou 44', 45+5' (pen.), 90+5' (pen.); Al-Obaid (yellow card) 51'; Ceesay 90+8'	Report	Sami (yellow card) 1', (goal) 75'; Krychowiak (yellow card) 7'; Al-Habib (yellow card) 45+2' (yellow-red card) 47'; Munshi 64' (o.g.); Bguir (yellow card) 79'	Stadium: Prince Sultan bin Abdul Aziz Stadium; Attendance: 637; Referee: Ahmed Al-Rumaikhani

30 November 2023 15	Abha	0–6	Al-Ahli	Abha
18:00	Sami (yellow card) 73'; Bguir (yellow card) 80'	Report	Veiga 20', 45'; Al-Buraikan 22', 28'; Hindi (yellow card) 37'; Kessié 38'; Ibañez (yellow card) 49'; Mahrez 64'	Stadium: Prince Sultan bin Abdul Aziz Stadium; Attendance: 10,941; Referee: Sergei Karasev (Russia)

8 December 2023 16	Al-Khaleej	3–1	Abha	Dammam
18:00	Martins 16', (yellow card) 38' (yellow-red card) 64'; Rodrigues (yellow card) 39', (goal) 59'; Sherif 45+3'; Rebocho (yellow card) 46'; Al-Haidari (yellow card) 77'	Report	Sami 80'; Al-Kunaydiri (yellow card) 90+8'	Stadium: Prince Mohamed bin Fahd Stadium; Attendance: 2,122; Referee: Abdullah Al-Harbi

14 December 2023 17	Abha	1–1	Al-Hazem	Abha
18:00	Krychowiak 79'; Abdulelah S. (yellow card) 80'; Naji (yellow card) 85'; Sami (yellow card) 86'	Report	Al-Thani (yellow card) 53'; Selemani 64', (yellow card) 74'; Al Mohaimed (yellow card) 81'; Viana (yellow card) 89'	Stadium: Prince Sultan bin Abdul Aziz Stadium; Attendance: 257; Referee: Mohammed Al-Beredi

21 December 2023 18	Al-Hilal	7–0	Abha	Riyadh
21:00	Milinković-Savić 18', 79', 90+5'; Mitrović 25' (pen.), (yellow card) 55'; Al-Dawsari 72'; Kanno 82'; Neves 86'	Report	Sami (yellow card) 51'; Natiq (yellow card) 55'; Krychowiak (yellow card) 67'	Stadium: Prince Faisal bin Fahd Stadium; Attendance: 13,476; Referee: Bastian Dankert (Germany)

29 December 2023 19	Al-Raed	4–3	Abha	Buraidah
18:00	Al-Subaie 21'; Gonzalez (yellow card) 40', (goal) 90+7'; Fouzair 46'; El Berkaoui 50'; Al-Jayzani (yellow card) 66'	Report	Al-Ali 17', 45+3'; Matić (yellow card) 30'; Al-Sahafi (yellow card) 59'; Noguera 67'; Natiq (yellow card) 77'	Stadium: King Abdullah Sport City Stadium; Attendance: 3,015; Referee: Shukri Al-Hanfoush

15 February 2024 20	Abha	1–1	Al-Taawoun	Abha
17:00	Al-Jumayah (yellow card) 45+6'; Al-Ali (yellow card) 54'; Al-Ahmed 90+3' (o.g.); Al-Mutairi (yellow card) 90+9'	Report	Flávio (yellow card) 57'; Al-Shoeil (yellow card) 89'; El Mahdioui 90+6'; Al-Dhulayfi (yellow card) 90+8'	Stadium: Prince Sultan bin Abdul Aziz Stadium; Attendance: 505; Referee: Faisal Al-Blwi

25 February 2024 21	Al-Fayha	3–2	Abha	Al Majma'ah
17:00	Al-Shuwaish (red card) 4'; Sabiri 45+1', (yellow card) 90+7'; Sakala 70', 89'	Report	Krychowiak (yellow card) 21', (goal) 29' (pen.); Matić (yellow card) 45+2'; Al-Zubaidi (yellow card) 82'; Abdu 90+6'	Stadium: Al Majma'ah Sports City; Attendance: 840; Referee: Abdullah Al-Harbi

1 March 2024 22	Abha	2–0	Al-Tai	Abha
17:00	Krychowiak 38', 49'; Sami (yellow card) 57'; Al-Jumayah (yellow card) 89'	Report	Bajandouh (yellow card) 21'; Al-Omari (yellow card) 29'; Al-Toiawy (yellow card) 63'	Stadium: Prince Sultan bin Abdul Aziz Stadium; Attendance: 689; Referee: Abdulsamad Bakri

9 March 2024 23	Al-Ettifaq	3–0	Abha	Dammam
17:00	Krychowiak 54' (o.g.); Toko Ekambi 73'; Dembélé 89'	Report	Krychowiak (yellow card) 51'; Al-Ali (yellow card) 65'	Stadium: Al-Ettifaq Club Stadium; Attendance: 7,802; Referee: Mohammed Abu Shaqarah

14 March 2024 24	Abha	1–0	Al-Wehda	Abha
22:00	Al-Sahafi 34'	Report	Bakshween (red card) 22'; I. Hawsawi (yellow card) 55'; Goodwin (yellow card) 61' van Crooij (yellow card) 90+2'; Al-Bishi (yellow card) 90+6'	Stadium: Prince Sultan bin Abdul Aziz Stadium; Attendance: 873; Referee: Abdullah Al-Kharboush

30 March 2024 25	Al-Riyadh	1–1	Abha	Riyadh
22:00	Al Abbas 70'	Report	Al-Zubaidi (yellow card) 5'; Kamano 26'; Abdulelah S. (yellow card) 67'; Al-Ali (yellow card) 89'	Stadium: Prince Faisal bin Fahd Stadium; Attendance: 194; Referee: Majed Al-Shamrani

2 April 2024 26	Abha	0–8	Al-Nassr	Abha
22:00	Al-Zubaidi (yellow card) 14'; Krychowiak (yellow card) 29'	Report	Ronaldo 11', 21', 42'; Mané 33'; Al-Sulaiheem 44'; Ghareeb 51'; Al-Aliwa 63', 86'	Stadium: Prince Sultan bin Abdul Aziz Stadium; Attendance: 12,079; Referee: Ahmed Al-Rumaikhani

7 April 2024 27	Abha	2–1	Al-Fateh	Abha
22:00	Krychowiak 6', 57'; Al-Zubaidi (yellow card) 10'; Al-Jumayah (yellow card) 33'; Kamano (yellow card) 90+4'	Report	Tello 54'	Stadium: Prince Sultan bin Abdul Aziz Stadium; Attendance: 679; Referee: Mohammed Al-Harbi

18 April 2024 28	Al-Shabab	5–0	Abha	Riyadh
21:00	Carrasco 45+1', 90+3'; Diallo 57'; Carlos 78', 84'	Report	Al-Jumayah (yellow card) 28'; Al-Sahafi (yellow card) 79'	Stadium: Al-Shabab Club Stadium; Attendance: 4,563; Referee: Shukri Al-Hanfoush

27 April 2024 29	Al-Okhdood	4–0	Abha	Najran
18:00	Pedroza (yellow card) 31', (goal) 74'; Kvirkvelia 40', (yellow card) 53'; Al-Zubaidi 47'; Al-Rubaie (yellow card) 56'; Al Hatila 90+3'	Report	Al-Zubaidi (yellow card) 50'	Stadium: Prince Hathloul bin Abdul Aziz Sports City; Attendance: 1,017; Referee: Mohammed Al-Hoaish

3 May 2024 30	Abha	3–1	Al-Ittihad	Abha
21:00	Krychowiak 57' (pen.); Al-Ali 69'; Noguera 73'; Abdu (yellow card) 90+9'	Report	Jota 63'	Stadium: Prince Sultan bin Abdul Aziz Stadium; Attendance: 8,181; Referee: Ahmed Al-Rumaikhani

10 May 2024 31	Abha	0–0	Damac	Abha
18:00	Al-Ali (yellow card) 16'; Matić (yellow card) 25'; Noguera (yellow card) 75'	Report	Munshi (yellow card) 27'	Stadium: Prince Sultan bin Abdul Aziz Stadium; Attendance: 954; Referee: Sami Al-Jires

18 May 2024 32	Al-Ahli	5–1	Abha	Jeddah
21:00	Al-Buraikan 8'; Al-Johani 45+1'; Ibañez (yellow card) 47'; Al-Nabit 72'; Mahrez 85'; Kessié 87'	Report	Al-Ali (yellow card) 13'; Kamano (yellow card) 49'; Mendy 90+1' (o.g.)	Stadium: King Abdullah Sports City; Attendance: 22,965; Referee: Tamás Bognár (Hungary)

23 May 2024 33	Abha	2–1	Al-Khaleej	Abha
21:00	Kamano 34'; Al-Jumayah (yellow card) 72'; Noguera (yellow card) 76', (goal) 90+4'; Abdu (yellow card) 90+5'	Report	López (yellow card) 34'; Al Salem 78'; Narey (yellow card) 90+1'	Stadium: Prince Sultan bin Abdul Aziz Stadium; Attendance: 5,113; Referee: Majed Al-Shamrani

27 May 2024 34	Al-Hazem	2–1	Abha	Ar Rass
21:00	Badamosi 58'; Al-Thani 80'	Report	Krychowiak (yellow card) 27'; Al-Mutairi (yellow card) 37'; Abdu 47'; Al-Qumayzi (yellow card) 85'; Tisserand (red card) 90+5'	Stadium: Al-Hazem Club Stadium; Attendance: 117; Referee: Faisal Al-Blwi

=== King Cup ===
All times are local, AST (UTC+3).

27 September 2023 Round of 32	Abha	1–0 (a.e.t.)	Hajer	Abha
21:00	Krychowiak (yellow card) 8'; Abdulelah S. (yellow card) 22'; Al-Ali (yellow card) 65'; Kamano (yellow card) 74'; Abdu 93'	Report	Bitang (yellow card) 7'; Majrashi (yellow card) 32'; Al-Khalifa (yellow card) 74'	Stadium: Prince Sultan bin Abdul Aziz Stadium; Referee: Freej Al-Jaloud

31 October 2023 Round of 16	Al-Ahli	1–2	Abha	Jeddah
21:00	Mahrez 45+8' (pen.)	Report	Abdu 45+2'; Al-Qumayzi (yellow card) 45+5'; Al-Habib (yellow card) 45+5'; Sami (red card) 52'; Toko Ekambi 67'; François Kamano (yellow card) 73' (yellow-red card) 90+3'	Stadium: Prince Abdullah Al Faisal Stadium; Attendance: 13,635; Referee: Paulo Cesar Zanovelli (Brazil)

11 December 2023 Quarter-finals	Abha	1–2	Al-Khaleej	Abha
15:30	Toko Ekambi 61'; Abdulelah S. (yellow card) 63'; Al-Mutairi (yellow card) 90+4'	Report	Martins 30', (yellow card) 69'; Rodrigues (yellow card) 50'; Al-Samiri (yellow card) 66'; Narey 83'	Stadium: Prince Sultan bin Abdul Aziz Stadium; Referee: Abdulsamad Bakri

== Statistics ==
=== Appearances ===
Last updated on 27 May 2024.

No.	Pos	Nat	Player	Total		Pro League		King Cup	
No.	Pos	Nat	Player	Apps	Goals	Apps	Goals	Apps	Goals
Goalkeepers
1	GK	(Saudi Arabia) KSA	Abdullah Al-Shammeri	0	0	0	0	0	0
12	GK	(Saudi Arabia) KSA	Abdulrahman Al-Bouq	0	0	0	0	0	0
16	GK	(Romania) ROU	Ciprian Tătărușanu	36	0	33	0	3	0
33	GK	(Saudi Arabia) KSA	Mansour Jawhar	0	0	0	0	0	0
Defenders
3	DF	(Saudi Arabia) KSA	Mohammad Naji	20	0	16+2	0	2	0
13	DF	(Saudi Arabia) KSA	Mohammed Al-Kunaydiri	25	0	7+16	0	0+2	0
15	DF	(Saudi Arabia) KSA	Ibrahim Al-Zubaidi	14	0	14	0	0	0
17	DF	(Saudi Arabia) KSA	Saleh Al-Qumayzi	31	0	20+8	0	2+1	0
18	DF	(Argentina) ARG	Fabián Noguera	32	3	29+1	3	2	0
22	DF	(Saudi Arabia) KSA	Yousef Al Aqeel	0	0	0	0	0	0
24	DF	(Saudi Arabia) KSA	Mohammed Al-Oufi	13	0	4+7	0	1+1	0
26	DF	(Democratic Republic of the Congo) COD	Marcel Tisserand	11	0	11	0	0	0
30	DF	(Saudi Arabia) KSA	Ziyad Al-Sahafi	21	1	18+2	1	1	0
32	DF	(Saudi Arabia) KSA	Sulaiman Asiri	1	0	0+1	0	0	0
Midfielders
5	MF	(Poland) POL	Grzegorz Krychowiak	36	9	31+2	9	3	0
8	MF	(Serbia) SRB	Uroš Matić	32	0	26+3	0	2+1	0
10	MF	(Tunisia) TUN	Saad Bguir	30	3	17+11	3	2	0
14	MF	(Saudi Arabia) KSA	Fahad Al-Jumayah	28	1	24+2	1	2	0
21	MF	(Saudi Arabia) KSA	Zakaria Sami	22	3	20	3	2	0
23	MF	(Saudi Arabia) KSA	Nasser Al-Omran	2	0	0+2	0	0	0
27	MF	(Saudi Arabia) KSA	Hassan Al-Qayd	0	0	0	0	0	0
29	MF	(Saudi Arabia) KSA	Mohammed Al-Qahtani	4	0	3+1	0	0	0
80	MF	(Saudi Arabia) KSA	Abdulelah Al-Shammeri	24	0	10+11	0	2+1	0
88	MF	(Saudi Arabia) KSA	Saad Al-Selouli	13	0	4+9	0	0	0
97	MF	(Saudi Arabia) KSA	Waseem Al-Shehri	0	0	0	0	0	0
Forwards
9	FW	(Saudi Arabia) KSA	Hassan Al-Ali	23	3	14+7	3	1+1	0
11	FW	(Guinea) GUI	François Kamano	33	2	25+6	2	1+1	0
19	FW	(Montenegro) MNE	Luka Đorđević	7	0	4+3	0	0	0
71	FW	(Eritrea) ERI	Ahmed Abdu Jaber	27	5	10+14	3	2+1	2
77	FW	(Saudi Arabia) KSA	Meshal Al-Mutairi	21	0	9+10	0	0+2	0
Player who made an appearance this season but have left the club
4	DF	(Iraq) IRQ	Saad Natiq	10	0	6+2	0	1+1	0
6	DF	(Saudi Arabia) KSA	Ahmed Al-Habib	11	0	5+5	0	1	0
7	FW	(Cameroon) CMR	Karl Toko Ekambi	17	7	13+1	5	3	2
60	GK	(Cameroon) CMR	Devis Epassy	1	0	1	0	0	0
64	MF	(Saudi Arabia) KSA	Nawaf Al-Sadi	2	0	0+2	0	0	0
90	FW	(Saudi Arabia) KSA	Omar Al-Ruwaili	6	1	0+6	1	0	0

=== Goalscorers ===
Rank	No.	Pos	Nat	Name	Pro League	King Cup	Total
1	5	MF	(Poland)	Grzegorz Krychowiak	9	0	9
2	7	FW	(Cameroon)	Karl Toko Ekambi	5	2	7
3	71	FW	(Eritrea)	Ahmed Abdu Jaber	3	2	5
4	9	FW	(Saudi Arabia)	Hassan Al-Ali	3	0	3
4	10	MF	(Tunisia)	Saad Bguir	3	0	3
4	18	DF	(Argentina)	Fabián Noguera	3	0	3
4	21	MF	(Saudi Arabia)	Zakaria Sami	3	0	3
8	11	FW	(Guinea)	François Kamano	2	0	2
9	14	MF	(Saudi Arabia)	Fahad Al-Jumayah	1	0	1
9	30	DF	(Saudi Arabia)	Ziyad Al-Sahafi	1	0	1
9	90	FW	(Saudi Arabia)	Omar Al-Ruwaili	1	0	1
Own goal					4	0	4
Total					38	4	42

Last Updated: 27 May 2024

=== Assists ===
Rank	No.	Pos	Nat	Name	Pro League	King Cup	Total
1	10	MF	(Tunisia)	Saad Bguir	3	1	4
2	13	DF	(Saudi Arabia)	Mohammed Al-Kunaydiri	3	0	3
2	77	FW	(Saudi Arabia)	Meshal Al-Mutairi	3	0	3
4	9	FW	(Saudi Arabia)	Hassan Al-Ali	2	0	2
4	11	FW	(Guinea)	François Kamano	1	1	2
4	14	MF	(Saudi Arabia)	Fahad Al-Jumayah	2	0	2
4	71	FW	(Eritrea)	Ahmed Abdu Jaber	2	0	2
8	4	DF	(Iraq)	Saad Natiq	1	0	1
8	5	MF	(Poland)	Grzegorz Krychowiak	1	0	1
8	7	FW	(Cameroon)	Karl Toko Ekambi	0	1	1
8	8	MF	(Serbia)	Uroš Matić	1	0	1
8	24	DF	(Saudi Arabia)	Mohammed Al-Oufi	1	0	1
8	80	MF	(Saudi Arabia)	Abdulelah Al-Shammeri	1	0	1
Total					20	3	23

Last Updated: 27 May 2024

=== Clean sheets ===
Rank	No.	Pos	Nat	Name	Pro League	King Cup	Total
1	16	GK	(Romania)	Ciprian Tătărușanu	4	1	5
Total					4	1	5

Last Updated: 10 May 2024
