= Jherson Mosquera =

Colombian footballer

Personal information
- Full name: Jherson Steven Mosquera Castro
- Date of birth: 18 August 1999 (age 27)
- Place of birth: Pereira, Colombia
- Height: 1.73 m (5 ft 8 in)
- Position: Right-back

Team information
- Current team: Deportes Tolima

Youth career
- Deportivo Pereira

Senior career*
| Years | Team | Apps | (Gls) |
| 2018–2023 | Deportivo Pereira | 99 | (1) |
| 2023–2026 | Newell's Old Boys | 32 | (3) |
| 2024–2025 | → Independiente Medellín (loan) | 30 | (1) |
| 2026– | Deportes Tolima | 0 | (0) |
- * Club domestic league appearances and goals as of 11:27, 19 March 2026 (UTC)

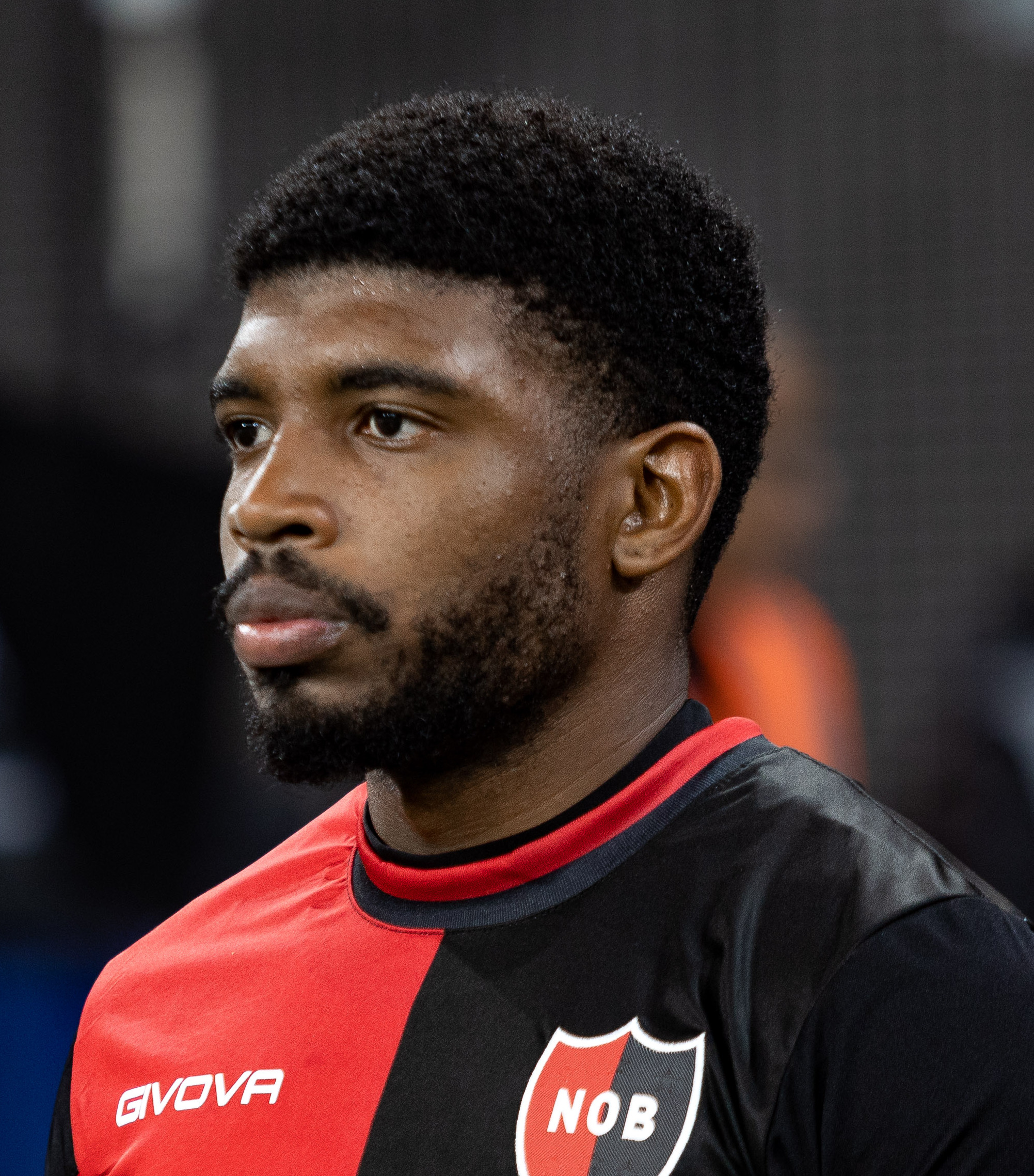

Jherson Steven Mosquera Castro (born 18 August 1999) is a Colombian professional footballer who plays as a right-back for Categoría Primera A club Deportes Tolima.

== Career ==
Mosquera came through the youth setup at Deportivo Pereira, playing professional for the first time in 2018 before being an established player in the first team in the 2021 season. On 28 August 2022, he made his 100th appearance for the club in a 1–1 draw against La Equidad. He was part of the team that won the Clausura in the 2022 season.

On 28 January 2023, he moved to Argentina to sign for Liga Profesional side Newell's Old Boys, signing a four-year contract. He scored his first goal for the club on 19 February in a 2–0 win against Banfield. In August 2023, he was suspended for four months following a positive doping test dating back to his time at Deportivo Pereira. The ban was later extended to 12 months.

On 5 July 2024, he was loaned back to Colombia to Independiente Medellín for a year with an option to buy. His doping ban ended on August 23. On 8 July 2025, he returned to Newell's after his loan ended.

== Career statistics ==
As of 27 February 2026

Appearances and goals by club, season and competition
| Club | Season | League | | | Cup (Note: Includes Copa Colombia, Copa Argentina) | | Continental | | Other | | Total | |
| Club | Season | Division | Goals | Apps | Apps | Goals | Apps | Goals | Apps | Goals | Apps | Goals |
|---|---|---|---|---|---|---|---|---|---|---|---|---|
| Deportivo Pereira | 2018 | Categoría Primera B | 1 | 0 | — | | — | | — | | 1 | 0 |
| Deportivo Pereira | 2019 | Categoría Primera B | 6 | 0 | 6 | 0 | — | | — | | 12 | 0 |
| Deportivo Pereira | 2020 | Categoría Primera A | 5 | 0 | 3 | 0 | — | | — | | 8 | 0 |
| Deportivo Pereira | 2021 | Categoría Primera A | 43 | 0 | 7 | 0 | — | | — | | 50 | 0 |
| Deportivo Pereira | 2022 | Categoría Primera A | 44 | 1 | 3 | 0 | — | | — | | 47 | 1 |
| Deportivo Pereira | Total | | 99 | 1 | 19 | 0 | 0 | 0 | 0 | 0 | 118 | 1 |
| Newell's Old Boys | 2023 | Liga Profesional | 21 | 2 | 1 | 0 | 4 (Note: Appearances in Copa Sudamericana) | 0 | — | | 26 | 2 |
| Newell's Old Boys | 2025 | Liga Profesional | 10 | 1 | — | | — | | — | | 10 | 1 |
| Newell's Old Boys | 2026 | Liga Profesional | 1 | 0 | — | | — | | — | | 1 | 0 |
| Newell's Old Boys | Total | | 32 | 3 | 1 | 0 | 4 | 0 | 0 | 0 | 37 | 3 |
| Independiente Medellín (loan) | 2024 | Categoría Primera A | 10 | 1 | 6 | 0 | 2 | 0 | — | | 18 | 1 |
| Independiente Medellín (loan) | 2025 | Categoría Primera A | 20 | 0 | — | | — | | — | | 20 | 0 |
| Independiente Medellín (loan) | Total | | 30 | 1 | 6 | 0 | 2 | 0 | 0 | 0 | 38 | 1 |
| Career total | | | 161 | 5 | 26 | 0 | 6 | 0 | 0 | 0 | 193 | 5 |

== Honours ==
Deportivo Pereira

- Categoría Primera B: 2019
- Liga DIMAYOR: 2022-II
