= Calderara =

Calderara may refer to:

- Brian Calderara (born 1998), Argentine footballer
- Calderara di Reno, a municipality in Bologna, Italy
- Ferguson-Calderara House, a historic building in Fort Smith, Arkansas

== See also ==
- Calderari
- Calderaro
