= Hassan Al-Ali =

Hassan Al-Ali may refer to:

- Hassan Al-Ali (Scouting)
- Hassan Al-Ali (footballer) (born 2002)
