= Grzegorz Krychowiak =

Polish footballer (born 1990)

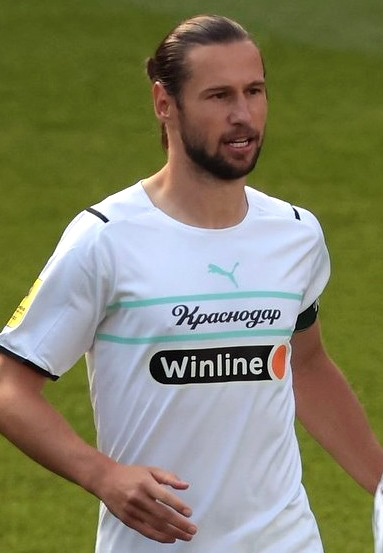
- Krychowiak playing for Krasnodar in 2021

Personal information
- Full name: Grzegorz Krychowiak
- Date of birth: 29 January 1990 (age 36)
- Place of birth: Gryfice, Poland
- Height: 1.86 m (6 ft 1 in)
- Position: Defensive midfielder

Youth career
- Orzeł Mrzeżyno
- Żaki 94 Kołobrzeg
- 2004: Stal Szczecin
- 2005–2006: Arka Gdynia
- 2006–2008: Bordeaux

Senior career*
Years	Team	Apps	(Gls)
2008–2012	Bordeaux	2	(0)
2009–2011	→ Reims (loan)	54	(4)
2011–2012	→ Nantes (loan)	21	(0)
2012–2014	Reims	70	(8)
2014–2016	Sevilla	58	(2)
2016–2019	Paris Saint-Germain	11	(0)
2017–2018	→ West Bromwich Albion (loan)	27	(0)
2018–2019	→ Lokomotiv Moscow (loan)	27	(2)
2019–2021	Lokomotiv Moscow	53	(18)
2021–2023	Krasnodar	14	(4)
2022	→ AEK Athens (loan)	9	(2)
2022–2023	→ Al-Shabab (loan)	30	(3)
2023–2024	Abha	33	(9)
2024–2025	Anorthosis Famagusta	20	(2)
2025	Mazur Radzymin	3	(0)
Total		432	(54)

International career
2006–2007	Poland U17	5	(0)
2007–2011	Poland U20	7	(1)
2009–2012	Poland U21	11	(3)
2008–2023	Poland	100	(5)
- * Club domestic league appearances and goals

Grzegorz Krychowiak ([ˈɡʐɛɡɔʂ krɨˈxɔvʲjak]; born 29 January 1990) is a Polish former professional footballer who played as a defensive midfielder.

Beginning his senior career in France with Bordeaux, Krychowiak later played for Reims, before joining Sevilla for €3.5 million in 2014, winning the UEFA Europa League in both of his two seasons at the club.

Krychowiak earned 100 caps for Poland national team between his international debut in 2008 to 2023, and represented the nation at two UEFA European Championships (2016 and 2020) and two FIFA World Cups (2018 and 2022).

== Club career ==
=== Early career ===
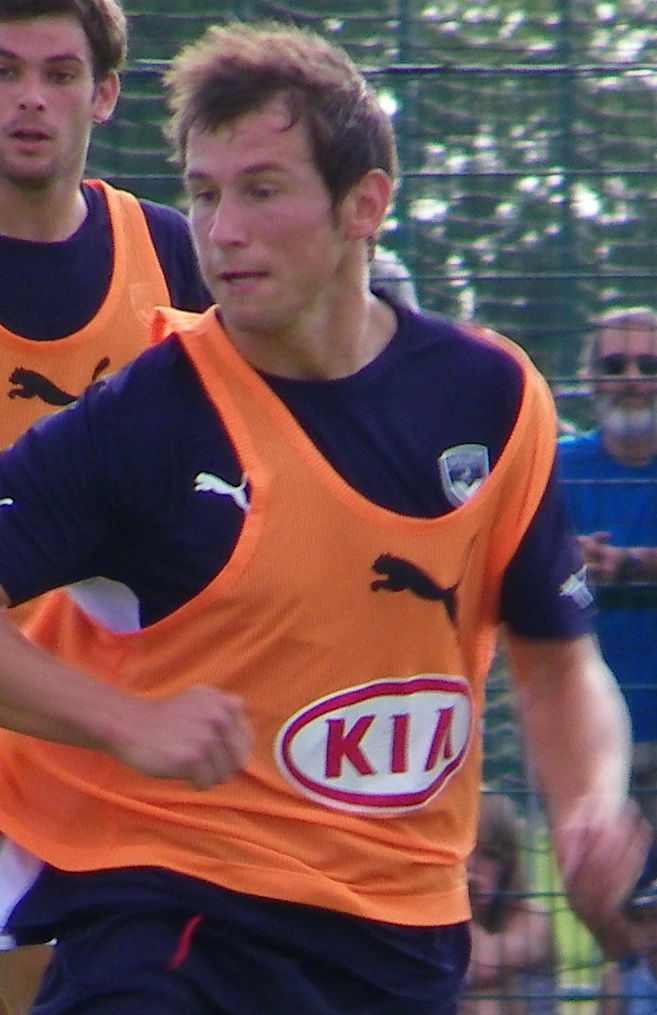
Krychowiak training at Bordeaux in 2009

Although initially not a big fan of football, Krychowiak became involved in the sport at his brother's insistence and left home at the age of 12 to join a sports academy. He then joined the academies of various clubs, including Orzeł Mrzeżyno, Żaki 94 Kołobrzeg, Stal Szczecin, and Arka Gdynia.

During the France U16 and Poland U16 in Strasbourg, Krychowiak's performance attracted interests by Philippe Goubet, leading him to join Bordeaux in 2006. He then progressed through the ranks of the club's youth system and signed his first professional contract with them.

==== Stade Reims (loan) ====
Having previously rejected a return to Poland, joining Arka Gdynia, it was announced on 26 November 2009 that Krychowiak joined Championnat National club Stade de Reims on loan until the end of the season. He then made his debut for the club, starting the whole game, in a 3–0 win against Beauvais Oise on 27 November 2009. Krychowiak quickly became a regular in the starting eleven and scored two goals to help the club win promotion to Ligue 2. At the end of the 2009–10 season, he went on to make 19 appearances and scored two times in all competitions.

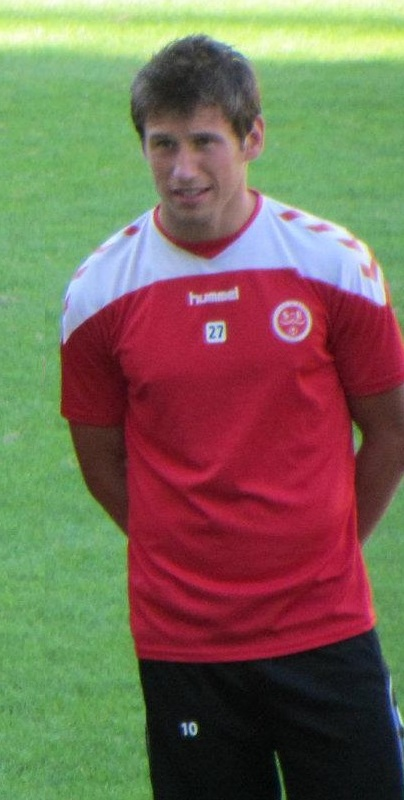
Krychowiak training with Stade de Reims in 2012

Reims and Bordeaux agreed to extend Krychowiak's loan for another season. After scoring in the penalty shootout in a victory against Troyes in the first round of the Coupe de la Ligue, he then scored his first goal of the season in a 2–2 draw against Le Mans. Two weeks later against Angers on 5 November 2010, he was sent off for a second bookable offence, in a 2–0 win. Krychowiak later faced suspension on two occasions later in the 2010–11 season. Despite this, Krychowiak was a regular starter as the club finished 10th in its return to Ligue 2 and was voted by fans as the team's player of the season. Although Krychowiak usually plays as a defensive midfielder, on rare occasions he has also appeared in central defense. At the end of the 2010–11 season, Krychowiak made 40 appearances and scored two times in all competitions.

Following this, Krychowiak returned to Bordeaux for the 2011–12 season.

==== FC Nantes (loan) ====
However, Krychowiak's return to Bordeaux in the first half of the 2011–12 season restricted him to two appearances. On 17 November 2011, he joined Nantes on loan until the end of the season.

Krychowiak made his debut for the club as a starter in a 3–0 win against AS Monaco on 25 November 2011. Since joining Nantes, he continued to be a first team regular, playing in the defensive midfield position. At one point, Krychowiak played the centre-back position. Despite being suspended on three occasions later in the 2011–12 season, he went on to make 21 appearances in all competitions.

=== Stade Reims ===
In June 2012, Krychowiak signed a three-year contract with Stade de Reims who were newly promoted to Ligue 1. The move reportedly cost €800,000.

Krychowiak made his third debut for the club as a starter in a 1–0 loss against Marseille in the opening game of the season. Since joining Stade Reims on a permanent basis, he quickly established himself in the starting eleven, playing in the defensive midfield position. His performance against AS Nancy on 20 September 2012 drew comparison to Zlatan Ibrahimović after he set up one of the club's two goals in the game, with a 2–0 win. On 26 January 2013, Krychowiak scored his first goal for Reims in a 1–1 draw against Toulouse. He later scored three more goals, all of which were winning goals against Paris Saint-Germain, Lyon and Lorient. Despite missing three matches throughout the 2012–13 season, Krychowiak went on to make 36 appearances and scoring four times in all competitions.

Ahead of the 2013–14 season, Krychowiak was linked a move away from Stade de Reims but ended up staying at the club throughout the summer. In the opening game of the 2013–14 season, he scored his first goal of the season, in a 2–1 loss against Stade Rennais. Since the start of the 2013–14 season, Krychowiak continued to establish himself in the first team, playing the defensive midfield position. He made his 100th appearance for the club in a 0–0 draw against FC Nantes on 31 August 2013, coming on as a 56th-minute substitute. In a match against Marseille on 26 October 2013, he set up the winning goal for the club as they won 3–2. This was followed up by scoring his second goal of the season, in a 4–2 win against Bastia. He later scored two more goals later in the 2013–14 season. Despite being sidelined at least five occasions throughout the season, Krychowiak went on to make 36 appearances and scoring four times in all competitions.

Throughout the 2013–14 season, he continued to be linked a move away from Stade Reims. L'Union reported that he would leave the club at the end of the 2013–14 season.

=== Sevilla ===
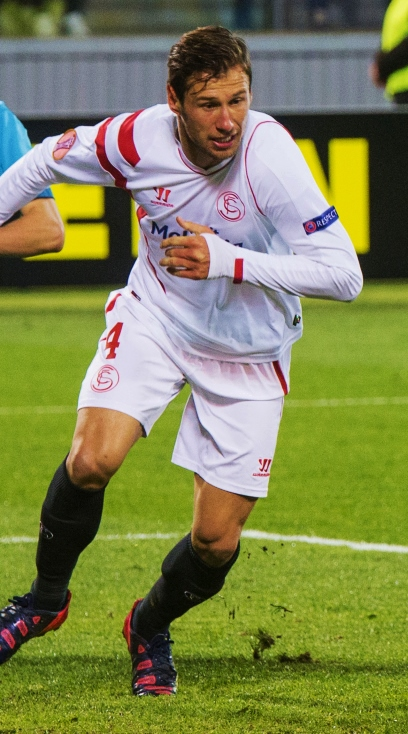
Krychowiak playing for Sevilla in 2015

In July 2014, Krychowiak joined La Liga side Sevilla for €4.5 million to play as a defensive midfielder.

He made his competitive debut on 12 August 2014 in the UEFA Super Cup at the Cardiff City Stadium, playing the full 90 minutes in a 2–0 defeat to Real Madrid. 11 days later, on 23 August 2014, Krychowiak made his La Liga debut for the club in a 1–1 draw against Valencia. Since making his debut for Sevilla, he quickly established himself in the starting eleven, playing in the midfield position. His performance earned praises from Marca, calling him the club's best signing this season. On 18 September 2014, Krychowiak scored his first goal for the club in a 2–0 win against Feyenoord in the UEFA Europa League group stage match. On 27 May 2015, he started for Sevilla in the 2015 UEFA Europa League Final in Poland's National Stadium in Warsaw, and scored the team's equalising goal in the 28th minute of an eventual 3–2 win over Dnipro, becoming the fifth Polish player to win the competition. He was the only Sevilla player named in the La Liga Team of the Season. Krychowiak made 48 appearances and scoring four times in all competitions.

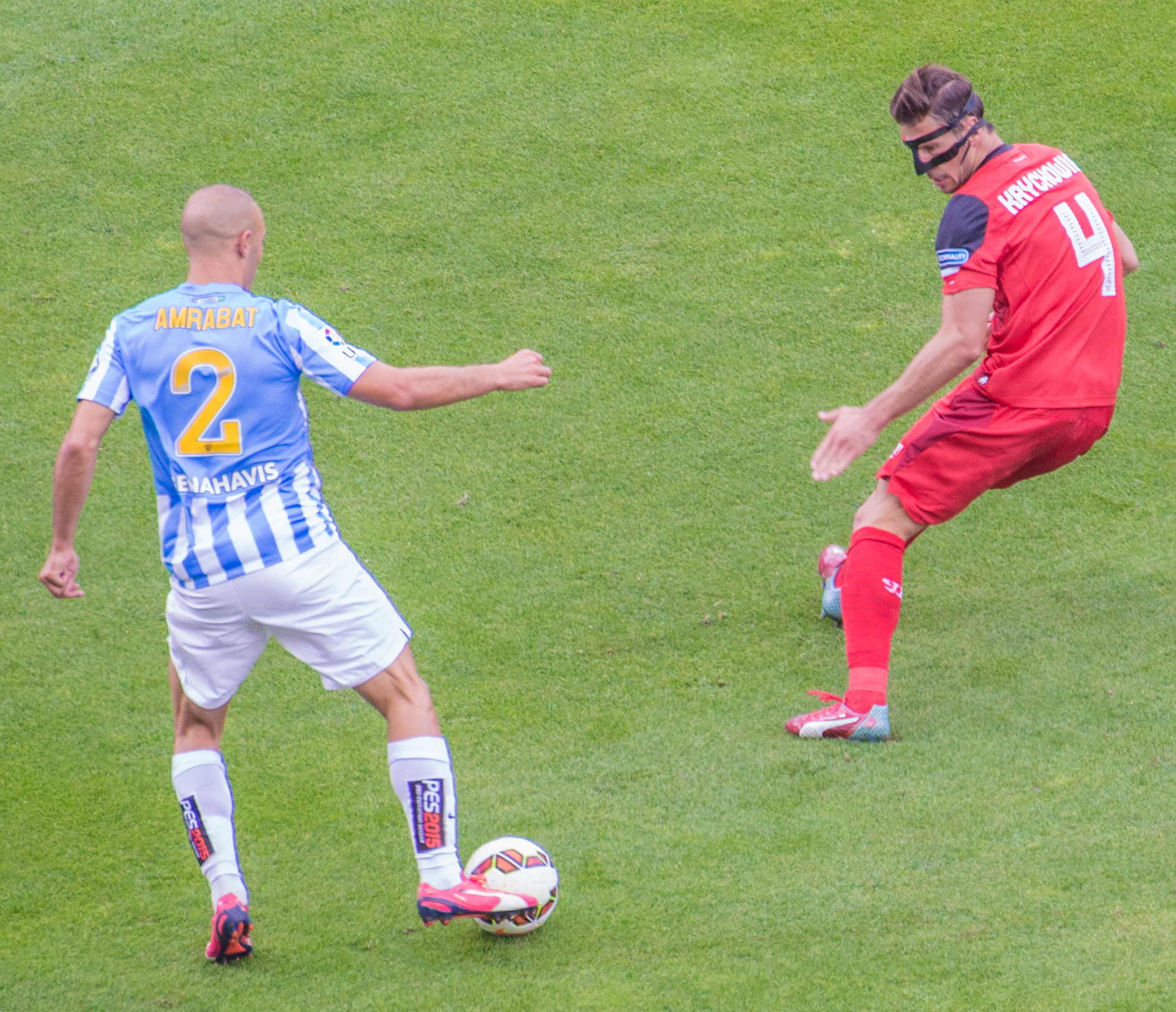
Krychowiak (wearing a protective mask) preparing to tackle Málaga's Nordin Amrabat in the last game of the season

On 11 August 2015, he started the season for Sevilla in the 2015 UEFA Super Cup 5–4 loss against Barcelona, and suffered a broken rib but still played the full 120 minutes. Having started in the centre-back position in the opening game of the season, he continued to play in the defensive midfield position. As a result, the club began talks with Krychowiak over a new contract. Manager Unai Emery praised his performance, calling "his sacrifice and dedication towards the team always puts them at their service". On 5 November 2015, Krychowiak signed a contract extension with Sevilla, keeping him at the club until 2019. Shortly after, he captained the club in a number of matches for the rest of the year. After serving a one match suspension, he then scored his first goal of the season, in a 2–0 win against rivals Real Betis in the first leg of the Copa del Rey last 16 tournament. Three days later, on 9 January 2016, he suffered a knee injury that saw him sidelined for two months. On 20 March 2016, Krychowiak returned to the starting line-up against Real Madrid, as the club lost 3–2. Since returning to the first team, he later contributed two assists in two second leg matches in the UEFA Europa League quarter-final and semi-finals against Athletic Bilbao and Shakhtar Donetsk respectively, to send Sevilla to the UEFA Europa League Final for the third time in a row. He started in the UEFA Europa League Final against Liverpool and played the whole game as they won 3–1, winning the tournament for the third time in a row.

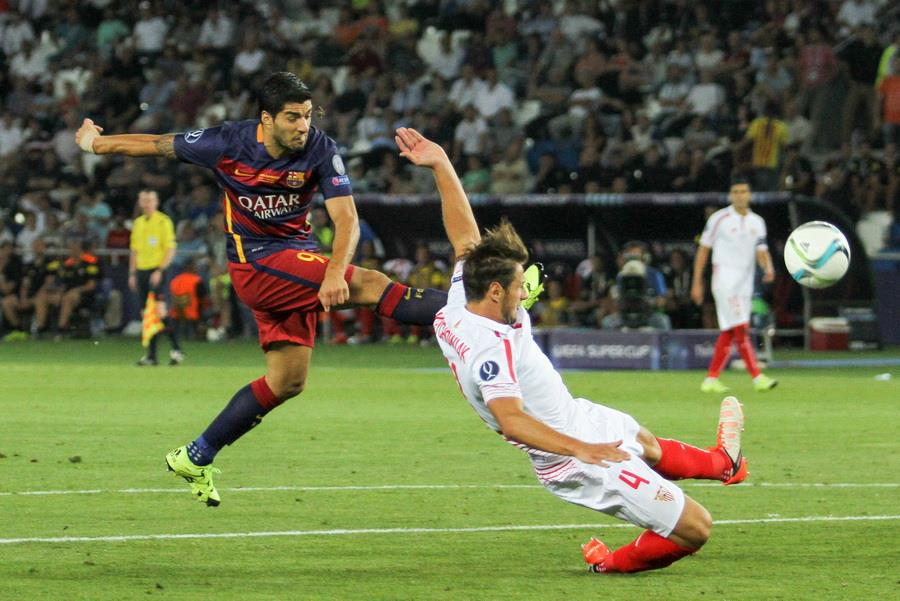
Krychowiak attempts to block a shot from Luis Suárez against FC Barcelona in the UEFA Super Cup

=== Paris Saint-Germain ===
On 3 July 2016, Krychowiak returned to France, signing a five-year deal with champions Paris Saint-Germain for an undisclosed fee.

Following a two-match ban, he made his debut for the club, coming on as a second-half substitute, in a 1–1 draw against Saint-Étienne on 9 September 2016. Four days later on 13 September 2016, he started his first games for Paris Saint-Germain, as they drew 1–1 against Arsenal.

Throughout the season, Krychowiak found himself on the bench and only started six matches by the end of the first half of the season. This led manager Unai Emery commented about Krychowiak's first team status on two separate statements, saying: "I know him well, he can do more in the field but Krychowiak and Adrien Rabiot are prepared and will be important for the whole season. At the moment, I think the three you mentioned are the best for the team. Krychowiak is an experienced player. All are important."

By the second half of the season, however, Krychowiak's first team opportunities at the club became further limited, due to continuous competitions within the midfield position and his own injury concern. He later stated about his first team status: "Today I am in a difficult situation. But a lot of good players have been through this before me. It's not what I expected, but it's a test, and I have to get over it. [...] I never thought of leaving [...]. Leaving after six months would make no sense." Krychowiak appeared three times for Paris Saint-Germain in the second half of the season, including a historic 6–1 defeat to Barcelona, eliminating the club from the tournament. By the end of the 2016–17 season, he made 19 appearances in all competitions.

Following this, Krychowiak was named 'Flop of the Season' by Le Figaro. Despite this, he was linked a move away from Paris Saint-Germain in the summer transfer window. In response, Krychowiak wanted to stay at the club.

==== West Bromwich Albion (loan) ====
On 30 August 2017, it was announced that Krychowiak had joined Premier League club West Bromwich Albion on a season-long loan. On 14 October while on loan, Krychowiak said to the media that he felt deceived by Paris Saint-Germain manager Unai Emery, stating: "I spoke with the coach but every time when I spoke with him I felt deception. [...] The coach knows me very well. We spent two years together and before I signed the contract he told me to come to PSG, and I didn't play."

Krychowiak made his debut for the club in a 3–1 loss against Brighton & Hove Albion on 9 September 2017. Three weeks later, on 30 September 2017 against Watford, he set up West Bromwich Albion's first goal of the game, in a 2–2 draw. Since joining the club, Krychowiak became a first team regular for the side, playing in the midfield position. By November, he found himself placed on the substitute bench, with Jake Livermore and Sam Field preferred ahead of him. This led to reports over Krychowiak's future at the club, but new manager Alan Pardew wanted to keep him. As the season went by, he found himself alternating between the substitute bench and the starting eleven role. Krychowiak found himself in a controversy when he refused to shake Pardew's hand after being substituted in the 59th minute during a 4–1 loss against Leicester City on 10 March 2018. After the match, Krychowiak was criticised by Pardew for his actions and was fined as a result. This resulted in him being dropped to the substitute bench until Pardew's sacking. Following the appointment of Darren Moore, Krychowiak played the remaining matches of the season, as the club were relegated to the Championship. At the end of the 2017–18 season, Krychowiak made 31 appearances in all competitions. Following this, he returned to Paris Saint-Germain.

==== Lokomotiv Moscow (loan) ====
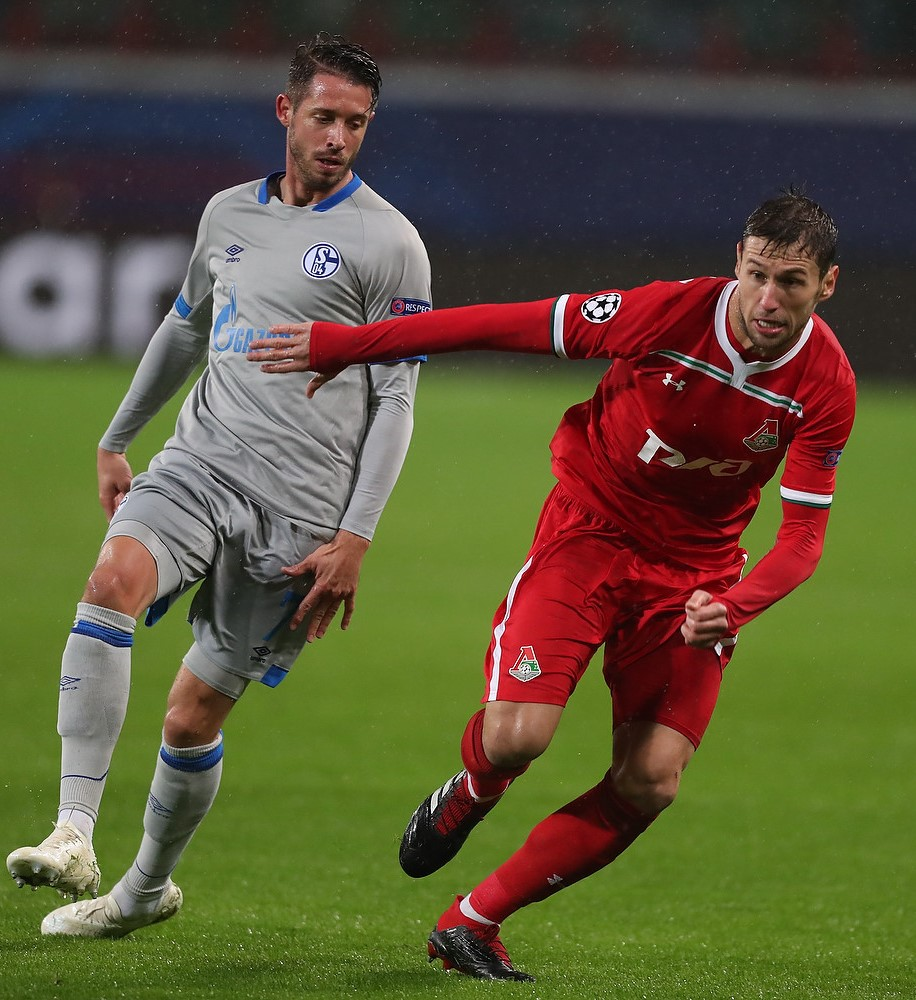
Krychowiak (right) being defended by Mark Uth in a match between Lokomotiv Moscow and Schalke 04, 2018

On 24 July 2018, Russian Premier League club Lokomotiv Moscow announced the signing of Krychowiak on a season-long loan deal with an obligation to buy for €10 million.

He made his debut for the club in a 0–0 draw against Spartak Moscow on 4 August 2018. Two weeks later on 19 August 2018, Krychowiak scored his first goal for Lokomotiv Moscow, in a 1–0 win against Krylia Sovetov Samara. This was followed up by setting up three assists in the next three matches, in which he was sent off for a second bookable offence against Dynamo Moscow. For his performance, Krychowiak was named the club's Player of the Month for August and then for November. He captained Lokomotiv Moscow for the first time in his career against Yenisey Krasnoyarsk in the round of 16 of the Russian Cup, only to receive a straight red card in the 71st minute, as the club won 4–1 to advance to the next round. Since joining Lokomotiv Moscow, Krychowiak established himself in the first team, playing in different midfield positions, and also rotated playing in the centre-back position. On 10 May 2019, Krychowiak scored his second goal of the season, in a 4–0 win against Rubin Kazan. He then started in the centre-back position in the Russian Cup Final against Ural Yekaterinburg and helped the club win 1–0 to win the tournament. Following this, Krychowiak said the season was successful, having helped Lokomotiv Moscow finish second place in the league and winning the Russian Cup. At the end of the 2018–19 season, he went on to make 39 appearances and scoring two times in all competitions.

=== Lokomotiv Moscow ===
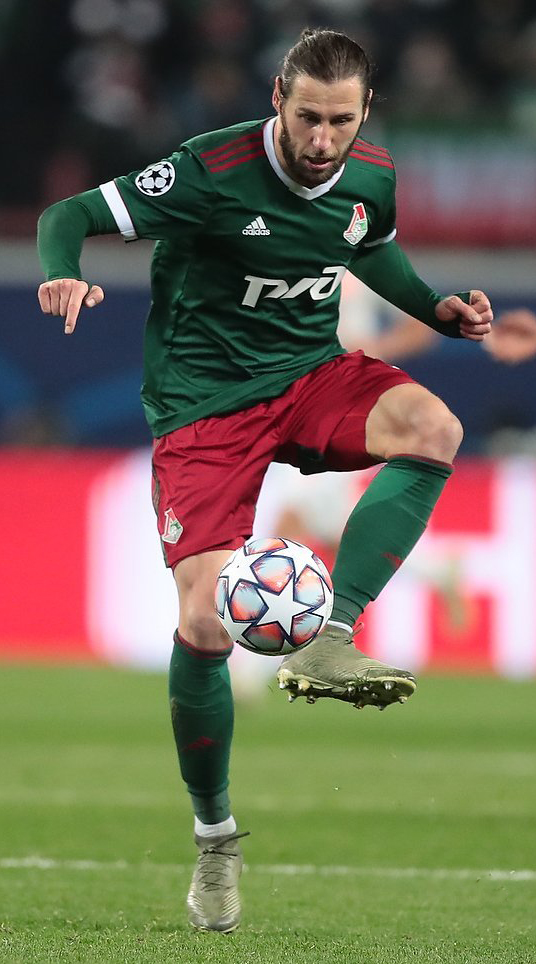
Krychowiak during a match between Lokomotiv Moscow and Bayern Munich in October 2020

On 3 July 2019, Lokomotiv announced that Krychowiak signed a contract with the club on a permanent basis. The move later reported to have cost €10 million.

His first game after signing for the club on a permanent basis came on 6 July 2019 against Zenit Saint Petersburg in the Russian Super Cup, as he set up Lokomotiv Moscow's second goal of the game in a 3–2 win. Krychowiak's performance saw him being named the club's Player of the Month in the first three months to the season. After missing two matches due to suspension and injury, Krychowiak returned to the first team in a 3–0 loss against Spartak Moscow on 27 October 2019. Two weeks later, in a match against FC Krasnodar on 10 November 2019, Krychowiak suffered an injury that saw him substituted at half time. After the match, it was revealed that he suffered a concussion, but quickly recovered. He scored twice in a follow-up match, in a 3–2 win against Tambov. As a result, Krychowiak was named Lokomotiv Moscow's Player of the Month for November. Following this, he remained in the first team until the season was suspended because of the COVID-19 pandemic in Russia. In the league's last match before the suspension, he scored his 10th goal of the season in a 3–1 win against Rostov. Following this, Krychowiak was named the club's Player of the Month for March. He remained an integral part of the team once the season resumed behind closed doors and made six further appearances, helping Lokomotiv Moscow qualify for the UEFA Champions League next season.

At the start of the 2020–21 season, Krychowiak once again started in the Russian Super Cup against Zenit Saint Petersburg, as Lokomotiv Moscow lost 2–1. He started the next five matches before suffering a muscle injury that saw him miss one match. After returning from injury, then scored his second goal of the season, in a 1–0 win against FC Ufa on 17 October 2020.

=== Krasnodar ===
On 1 August 2021, both Lokomotiv and FC Krasnodar announced that the clubs agreed on the transfer conditions for Krychowiak's move to Krasnodar, and the transfer will be made official after he passes the medical examination and signs a personal contract with Krasnodar. On 2 August, Krasnodar announced that he signed a three-year contract with the club. On 7 March 2022, FIFA announced that foreign players in Russia would be able to unilaterally suspend their contracts with their clubs until 30 June 2022 and sign with a club outside of Russia until 30 June 2022, and the transfer window is reopened for such players to sign and get registered for the new club until 7 April 2022. On 15 March 2022, FC Krasnodar announced that Krychowiak notified the club that he decided to use the new regulations and suspend his contract until 30 June 2022.

On 28 June 2023, Krychowiak announced that he terminated his contract with Krasnodar and became a free agent.

==== AEK Athens (loan) ====
On 15 March 2022, Krychowiak signed with AEK Athens until the end of the 2021–22 season.

==== Al-Shabab (loan) ====
On 8 July 2022, Krychowiak joined Al-Shabab in Saudi Arabia on a season-long loan.

=== Abha ===
On 30 July 2023, Saudi side Abha announced the signing of Krychowiak on one-year deal with an extension option, where he was reunited with former Poland national team manager Czesław Michniewicz.

=== Anorthosis Famagusta ===
On 28 September 2024, after spending the previous three months without a club, Krychowiak joined Cypriot outfit Anorthosis Famagusta on a deal until the end of the season.

=== Mazur Radzymin ===
In October 2025, Krychowiak was registered to play as an amateur until June 2026 for seventh-tier side Mazur Radzymin, joining fellow former Poland international Jakub Rzeźniczak.

He made his debut on 25 October 2025 match against the C-team of Polonia Warsaw, providing an early assist in a 3–3 draw. Krychowiak played 77 minutes and received a yellow card. Although registered for the entire season, Polish media reported that this was expected to be his only appearance for Mazur, as filming was taking place for an upcoming Amazon Prime documentary titled "Krychowiak: krok od szczytu" (“Krychowiak: A Step from the Top”).

The match drew an unusually large crowd for the regional league, with several hundred spectators attending and national media covering the event. His move to Radzymin was facilitated by rapper and Mazur player Kuba “Quebonafide” Grabowski, who had previously attracted attention by joining the club himself.

On 27 October 2025, Krychowiak announced his retirement from professional football on his Instagram. Two days later, he appeared in another league fixture for Mazur, a 2–0 win over Świt Nowy Dwór Mazowiecki's reserve team.

== International career ==
=== Youth career ===
Krychowiak represented Poland under-20s at the 2007 FIFA U-20 World Cup and scored a free kick against Brazil, the only goal of the match. He was the youngest outfield player named to the Poland U20 squad. He helped the U20 national side progress before being eliminated by Argentina U20 in the round of 16 of the tournament. Krychowiak went on to make seven appearances and scoring once for the U20 side.

In May 2009, Krychowiak was called up to the Poland U21 team for the first time. He made his U21 debut, playing the whole game in the centre-back position, in a 2–1 loss against Sweden U21 on 5 June 2009.

Two years later, Krychowiak was called up to the U21 team for the first time. He his first appearances in a 3–0 win against Albania U21 on 2 September 2011. This was followed up by captaining the U21 side in a 2–0 loss against Russia U21. On 11 October 2011, he scored his first Poland U21 goal, in a 4–3 win against Albania U21. Krychowiak then scored twice for the U21 side in a 4–2 win against Moldova U21 on 1 June 2012. He went on to make 11 appearances and scoring three times for Poland U21.

=== Senior career ===
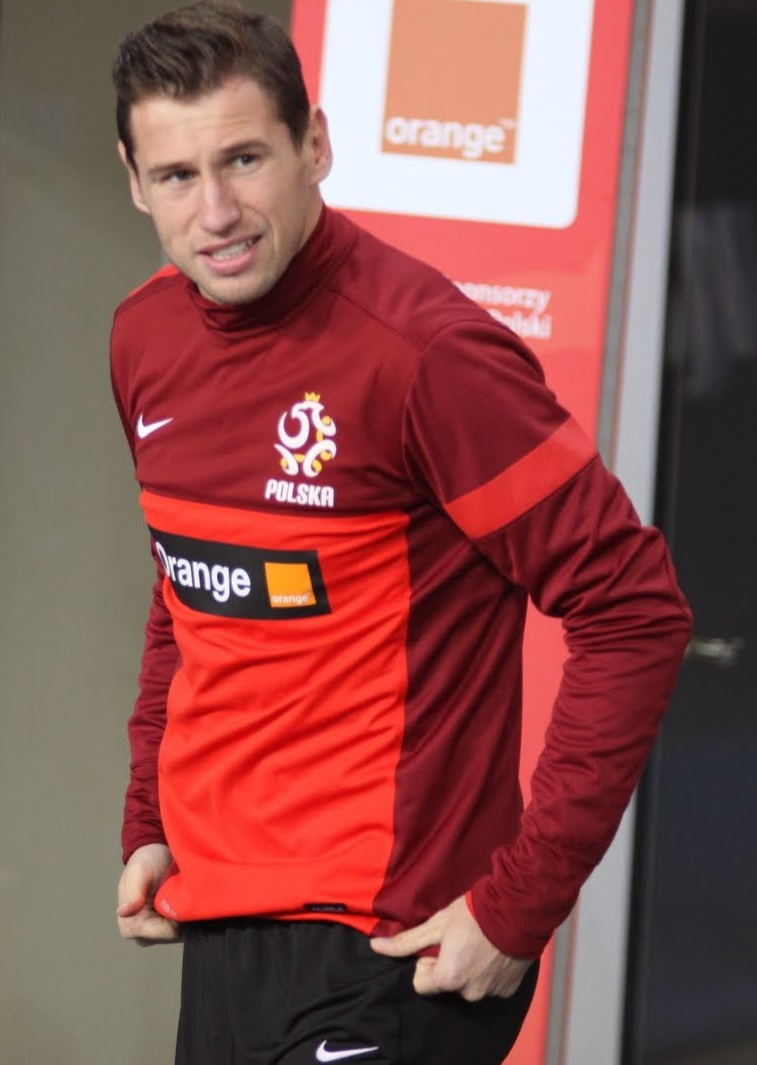
Krychowiak training for Poland in 2013

In December 2008, Krychowiak was called up to the senior squad for the first time. He made his first appearance in a friendly against Serbia on 14 December 2008. Since the game was not on an official FIFA date, the teams were mostly composed of players from the domestic leagues, as well as a few reserve players; however, it was counted as an official match.

Called up to the Poland team in August 2009, Krychowiak was next called up to the national team almost two years later in February 2011, making his first appearances in almost three years, coming on as a last minute substitute in a 1–0 win against Norway on 6 February 2011.

In August 2012, Krychowiak was called up to the national team after a year in abayance. He made an appearance against Moldova on 11 September 2012, coming on as a substitute in a 2–0 win. His first start for Poland came on 12 October 2012 against South Africa as they won 1–0. He played a number of matches as Poland failed to qualify for the FIFA World Cup in Brazil.

Krychowiak continued to feature in the national team, playing the defensive midfield position in effort to qualify for the UEFA Euro 2016 in France. On 14 November 2014, he scored his first international goal in a 4–0 UEFA Euro 2016 qualifying win in Georgia. He scored his second goal in Poland's final qualifying match against Ireland in a 2–1 victory which made Poland qualify for Euro 2016. In May 2016, Krychowiak was called by the national team for the UEFA Euro 2016 preliminary squad and later made the cut to be included in the 23 man squad ahead of the tournament. In Poland's opening game against Northern Ireland, he was voted man of the match following Poland's first ever win at a European Championship. Krychowiak played in the next two matches against Germany and Ukraine, earning a total four points to help Poland qualify for the knockout stage. He started the whole game and scored the final penalty in a 5–4 penalty shootout win over Switzerland in the round of 16. Krychowiak played every minute of the national side's historic Euro 2016 campaign, which ended in the quarter-finals losing to Portugal 3–5 in a penalty shootout. Following this, he was named Team of the Tournament by the EFE.

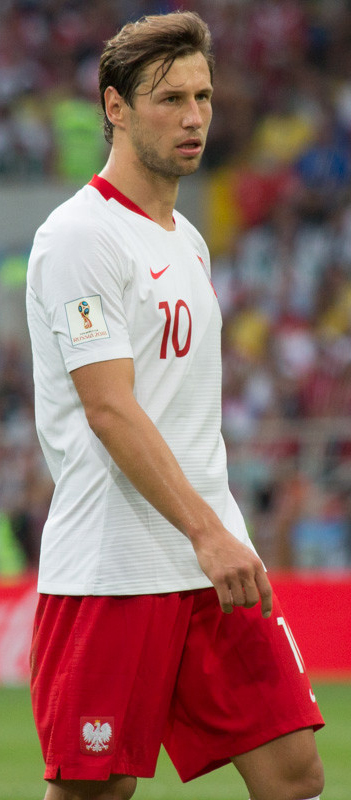
Krychowiak playing for Poland at the FIFA World Cup in Russia

Following the end of the UEFA Euro 2016 tournament, Krychowiak helped Poland earn a total of ten points in the FIFA World Cup qualification – UEFA Group E. He captained Poland for the first time, playing 45 minutes before being substituted in a 1–1 draw against Slovenia. He later helped the national side qualify for the 2018 FIFA World Cup. In May 2018, he was named in Poland's preliminary 35-man squad for the FIFA World Cup in Russia and later made the cut to be included in the 23 man squad. In the 2018 World Cup match against Senegal, Krychowiak caused M'Baye Niang's goal to give Senegal a 2–0 lead. After that error, he scored a goal himself, but Poland still lost 2–1 and they were later eliminated from the competition.

Following the end of the World Cup, Krychowiak played three out of the four matches in the UEFA Nations League, as Poland finished third place in Group 3. He then started the whole UEFA Euro 2020 qualifying matches to help Poland qualify for the UEFA Euro 2020.

On 10 September 2023, Krychowiak played his 100th and final game for Poland in a 2–0 away defeat against Albania in the UEFA Euro 2024 qualification, as he announced his retirement from international duty later that month.

== Personal life ==
In December 2019, Krychowiak married his longtime girlfriend, Celia Jaunat, whom they first met in 2010 and began dating two years later.

Krychowiak runs a boutique business with his brother. In May 2020, he invested over €1 million in a Polish construction startup called SYSTEM 3E. He said in an interview that he does not go to parties or drink alcohol.

In addition to speaking Polish, Krychowiak speaks French, Spanish and English. His fluency in Spanish contributed to him settling well in Sevilla. Since moving to Moscow, he began learning Russian. Krychowiak also began learning Italian in hopes of playing for an Italian club in the future.

During his third spell at Stade de Reims, Krychowiak was dubbed by the L'Union as "the Polish Terminator". While playing for Lokomotiv Moscow, he was called "Krykha" by his teammates, due to their difficulties of pronouncing his name. Krychowiak is good friends with Wojciech Szczęsny, having known each other since 2004. He completed a two-year studies at the Claude Bernard University Lyon 1.

== Career statistics ==
=== Club ===
Appearances and goals by club, season and competition
Club	Season	League			National cup (Note: Includes Coupe de France, Copa del Rey, FA Cup, Russian Cup, King's Cup, Cypriot Cup)		League cup (Note: Includes Coupe de la Ligue, EFL Cup)		Continental		Other		Total	
Club	Season	Division	Apps	Goals	Apps	Goals	Apps	Goals	Apps	Goals	Apps	Goals	Apps	Goals
Bordeaux	2011–12	Ligue 1	2	0	0	0	0	0	—		—		2	0
Reims (loan)	2009–10	Championnat National	19	2	0	0	0	0	—		—		19	2
Reims (loan)	2010–11	Ligue 2	35	2	3	0	2	0	—		—		40	2
Nantes (loan)	2011–12	Ligue 2	21	0	1	0	0	0	—		—		22	0
Reims	2012–13	Ligue 1	35	4	0	0	1	0	—		—		36	4
Reims	2013–14	Ligue 1	35	4	0	0	1	0	—		—		36	4
Reims	Reims total		124	12	3	0	4	0	—		—		131	12
Sevilla	2014–15	La Liga	32	2	2	0	—		13 (Note: Appearance(s) in UEFA Europa League)	2	1 (Note: Appearance in UEFA Super Cup)	0	48	4
Sevilla	2015–16	La Liga	26	0	3	1	—		12 (Note: Six appearances in UEFA Champions League, six appearances in UEFA Europa League)	0	1	0	42	1
Sevilla	Total		58	2	5	1	—		25	2	2	0	90	5
Paris Saint-Germain	2016–17	Ligue 1	11	0	1	0	1	0	6 (Note: Appearance(s) in UEFA Champions League)	0	0	0	19	0
Paris Saint-Germain B	2016–17	Championnat National 2	3	0	—		—		—		—		3	0
West Bromwich Albion (loan)	2017–18	Premier League	27	0	3	0	1	0	—		—		31	0
Lokomotiv Moscow (loan)	2018–19	Russian Premier League	27	2	6	0	—		6	0	0	0	39	2
Lokomotiv Moscow	2019–20	Russian Premier League	26	9	0	0	—		6	1	1 (Note: Appearance in Russian Super Cup)	0	33	10
Lokomotiv Moscow	2020–21	Russian Premier League	26	9	4	2	—		4	0	1	0	35	11
Lokomotiv Moscow	2021–22	Russian Premier League	1	0	—		—		—		1	0	2	0
Lokomotiv Moscow	Total		80	20	10	2	—		16	1	3	0	109	23
Krasnodar	2021–22	Russian Premier League	14	4	1	1	—		—		—		15	5
AEK Athens (loan)	2021–22	Super League Greece	9	2	—		—		—		—		9	2
Al-Shabab (loan)	2022–23	Saudi Pro League	30	3	1	0	—		0	0	4 (Note: Appearances in Arab Club Champions Cup)	0	35	3
Abha	2023–24	Saudi Pro League	33	9	3	0	—		—		—		36	9
Anorthosis Famagusta	2024–25	Cypriot First Division	20	2	1	0	—		—		—		21	2
Mazur Radzymin	2025–26	Liga okręgowa	3	0	—		—		—		—		3	0
Career total			435	54	29	4	6	0	47	3	9	0	526	61

=== International ===
Appearances and goals by national team and year
National team	Year	Apps	Goals
Poland	2008	1	0
Poland	2009	0	0
Poland	2010	0	0
Poland	2011	1	0
Poland	2012	4	0
Poland	2013	10	0
Poland	2014	8	1
Poland	2015	7	1
Poland	2016	13	0
Poland	2017	4	0
Poland	2018	11	1
Poland	2019	10	1
Poland	2020	6	0
Poland	2021	11	1
Poland	2022	12	0
Poland	2023	2	0
Total		100	5

Scores and results list Poland's goal tally first, score column indicates score after each Krychowiak goal.

List of international goals scored by Grzegorz Krychowiak
No.	Date	Venue	Opponent	Score	Result	Competition
1	14 November 2014	Boris Paichadze Dinamo Arena, Tbilisi, Georgia	Georgia	2–0	4–0	UEFA Euro 2016 qualifying
2	11 October 2015	Stadion Narodowy, Warsaw, Poland	Republic of Ireland	1–0	2–1	UEFA Euro 2016 qualifying
3	19 June 2018	Otkritie Arena, Moscow, Russia	Senegal	1–2	1–2	2018 FIFA World Cup
4	16 November 2019	Teddy Stadium, Jerusalem, Israel	Israel	1–0	2–1	UEFA Euro 2020 qualifying
5	2 September 2021	Stadion Narodowy, Warsaw, Poland	Albania	3–1	4–1	2022 FIFA World Cup qualification

== Honours ==
Sevilla

- UEFA Europa League: 2014–15, 2015–16

Paris Saint-Germain

- Coupe de France: 2016–17
- Coupe de la Ligue: 2016–17

Lokomotiv Moscow

- Russian Cup: 2018–19, 2020–21
- Russian Super Cup: 2019

Individual

- La Liga Team of the Season: 2014–15
- UEFA Europa League Squad of the Season: 2014–15, 2015–16
- Russian Premier League Central Midfielder of the Season: 2018–19, 2019–20, 2020–21

== See also ==
- List of men's footballers with 100 or more international caps
