= Gaspar Iñíguez =

Argentine footballer

Personal information
- Date of birth: 26 March 1994 (age 32)
- Place of birth: Villa Jardín, Lanús, Argentina
- Height: 1.72 m (5 ft 7 1/2 in)
- Position: Midfielder

Team information
- Current team: Racing Córdoba
- Number: 19

Youth career
- Argentinos Juniors

Senior career*
Years	Team	Apps	(Gls)
2011–2015	Argentinos Juniors	84	(2)
2015–2016	Granada	0	(0)
2015	→ Carpi (loan)	0	(0)
2016–2019	Udinese	0	(0)
2016–2017	→ Tigre (loan)	14	(0)
2019	→ Ascoli (loan)	3	(0)
2019–2020	Veracruz	10	(0)
2020–2021	Coquimbo Unido	15	(0)
2021–2022	San Marcos	22	(1)
2022–2023	Deportivo Riestra	19	(1)
2023–2024	Deportivo Merlo	16	(3)
2024–2025	Deportivo Laferrere	32	(2)
2025–2026	Newell's Old Boys	3	(0)
2026–	Racing Córdoba	4	(0)

International career
2011	Argentina U17	11	(0)
- * Club domestic league appearances and goals as of 17:15, 17 March 2026 (UTC)

Gaspar Emmanuel Iñíguez (born 26 March 1994) is an Argentine professional footballer who plays as a midfielder for Primera Nacional club Racing Córdoba.

== Club career ==
On 31 January 2019, he joined Ascoli on loan until the end of the 2018–19 season.

On 16 July 2019, he joined Mexican club Tiburones Rojos de Veracruz.

In 2021, Iñíguez joined San Marcos de Arica from Coquimbo Unido.

In 2024, he joined Deportivo Laferrere.

Iniguez struggles with obesity, in 2025 prior to joining Newells Old Boys he was required by the coaching staff to lose 22kg.
