= Calderari (surname) =

Calderari is an Italian surname. Notable people with the surname include:

- Enzo Calderari (born 1952), Swiss entrepreneur and former car racing driver
- Giovanni Maria Calderari (c. 1500–1570), Italian painter
- Marco Calderari (born 1953), Swiss Olympic sailor
- Ottone Calderari (1730–1803), Italian architect

== See also ==
- Calderara
- Calderaro
