= Isaac Newell =

English pioneer and teacher

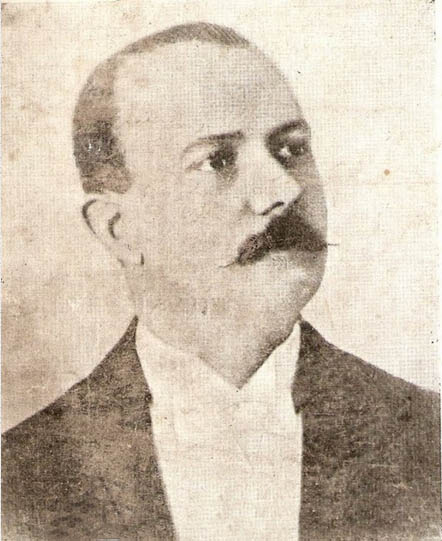
Isaac Newell

Isaac Newell (24 April 1853 – 16 October 1907) was an English schoolmaster who pioneered football in Argentina. He was the founder of both the Colegio Comercial Anglicano Argentino and the football club Old Boys, which is named in his honour.

== Leaving England ==
Isaac Newell was born on 24 April 1853 in Strood, Kent, England to Joseph Newell and Mary Goodger. Growing up, he was adventurous and had a passion for sport, especially football.

At the age of 16, with some friends of his father, he boarded a ship to Argentina, reportedly against the wishes of his mother. When he arrived in the city of Rosario he presented a letter of recommendation from his father to William Wheelwright, the administrator of the British-owned Central Argentine Railway. Wheelwright gave him a job as a telegraphist.

In 1876 he married Anna Jockinsen. In the same year, his first child, Claudio, was born, followed by Liliana, Fortinato and Margarita.

== Colegio Comercial Anglicano Argentino ==
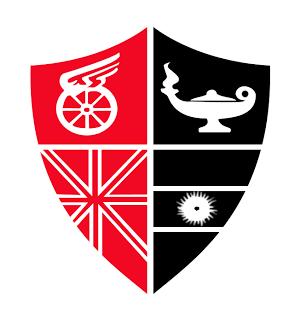
The logo designed by Newell for the school, whose colours were then adopted by the club Newell's Old Boys

Newell acquired a property and in 1884 he founded the Colegio Comercial Anglicano Argentino with a distinctive red and black emblem. The colours were taken from those of the flag of England and the flag of the German Empire. Newell's wife had German nationality.

It was in 1884 that the first football and set of rules arrived in Argentina. Newell decided to alternate study at the college with sporting activity. Over the years the sport gained in popularity at the college.

In 1900 Newell made his son Claudio and his daughter-in-law, Katie Cowell, directors of the school.

== Newell's Old Boys ==
Club Atlético Newell's Old Boys was founded on 3 November 1903. Claudio Newell was one of the principal founders.

The club was founded for teachers, students and alumni of the college, and was named in homage to Newell's life and achievements. The club's emblem and their kit take their colours from the Colegio Comercial Anglicano Argentino.
