= Fabián Noguera =

Argentine footballer

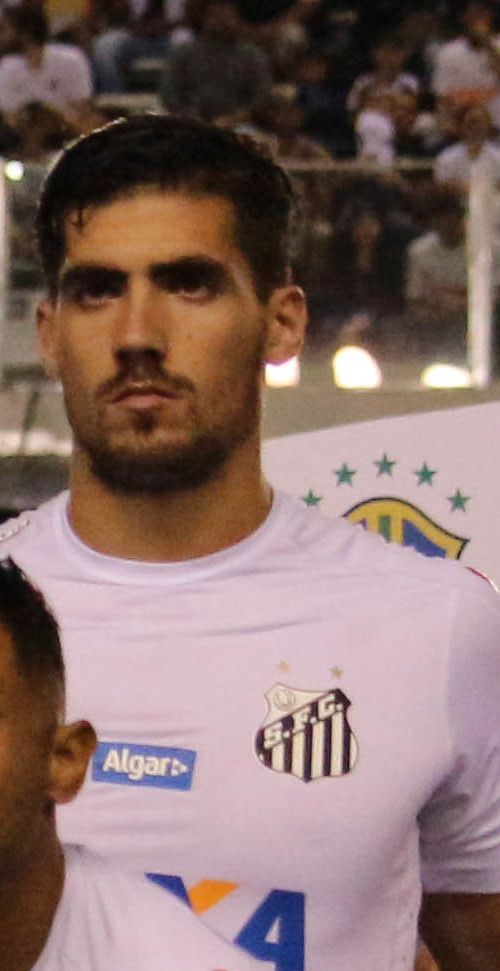
- Noguera with Santos

Personal information
- Full name: Fabián Ariel Noguera
- Date of birth: 20 March 1993 (age 33)
- Place of birth: Ramos Mejía, Argentina
- Height: 1.93 m (6 ft 4 in)
- Position: Centre-back

Youth career
- Banfield

Senior career*
Years	Team	Apps	(Gls)
2012–2016	Banfield	93	(11)
2016–2021	Santos	14	(1)
2018	→ Estudiantes (loan)	14	(2)
2019	→ Gimnàstic (loan)	16	(0)
2019–2020	→ Ponferradina (loan)	7	(0)
2021–2023	Estudiantes	68	(7)
2023	Nacional	21	(1)
2023–2025	Abha	52	(5)
2025–2026	Newell's Old Boys	6	(0)
- * Club domestic league appearances and goals as of 17:39, 4 October 2026 (UTC)

Fabián Ariel Noguera (born 20 March 1993) is an Argentine footballer who plays as a centre-back.

== Club career ==
=== Banfield ===
Born in Ramos Mejía, La Matanza, Buenos Aires Province, Noguera finished his formation with Banfield. After the club's relegation to Primera B Nacional in 2012, he was promoted to the first team.

On 23 October 2012, Noguera made his professional debut, starting and scoring his team's only in a 1–2 away loss against Gimnasia Jujuy. On 9 February of the following year, he scored a brace in a 2–0 home win against the same team.

Noguera scored seven goals during the campaign, as his side narrowly missed out promotion. After being an undisputed starter in 2013–14, contributing with 38 appearances and three goals as his side finally returned to Primera División.

Noguera made his debut in the main category of Argentine football on 8 August 2014, starting in a 0–3 loss at Godoy Cruz. He scored his first goal in the division on 10 May of the following year, netting the last in a 3–0 away win against Aldosivi.

=== Santos ===
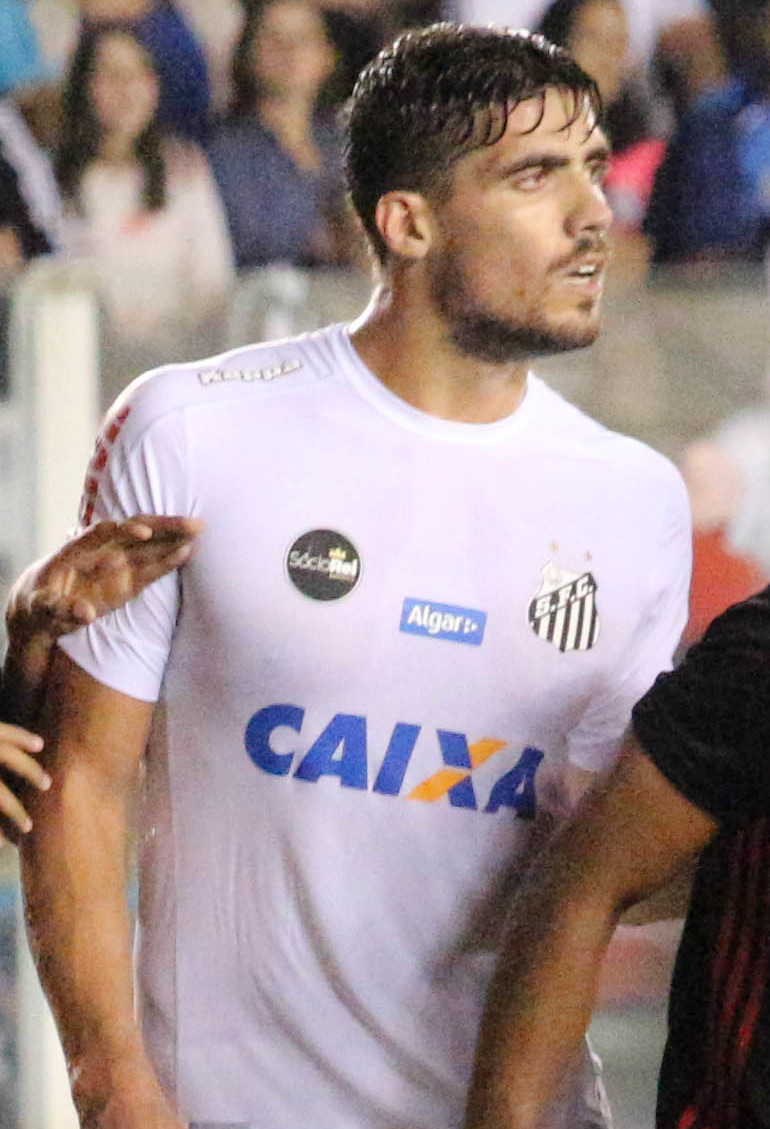
Noguera with Santos in 2017

On 21 February 2016, as his contract was due to expire, Noguera reached an agreement with Série A club Santos, with the deal being effective in May. On 5 July he signed a contract until June 2021 with the club, being officially presented a day later.

Noguera made his unofficial debut for the club on 8 October 2016, coming on as a first half substitute for Luiz Felipe and scoring his side's only in a 1–1 friendly draw against Benfica. He made his Série A debut five days later, coming on as a late substitute for Renato in a 1–0 away win against São Paulo.

Noguera scored his first official goal for Peixe on 16 October 2016, netting the equalizer in a 1–1 home draw against Grêmio. He made his Copa Libertadores debut the following 5 July, replacing Kayke in a 3–2 away win against Atlético Paranaense.

On 8 January 2021, after his loan spells, Noguera terminated his contract with Santos.

==== Estudiantes (loan) ====
On 23 January 2018, Noguera was loaned to Estudiantes for one year, with a buyout clause.

==== Gimnàstic (loan) ====
On 22 January 2019, Noguera moved to Spanish Segunda División side Gimnàstic de Tarragona, on loan until the end of the season. He became an immediate first-choice at the club, but suffered relegation.

==== Ponferradina (loan) ====
On 21 August 2019, Noguera agreed to a one-year loan deal with SD Ponferradina, still in the Spanish second division.

=== Abha ===
On 11 August 2023, Noguera joined Saudi Pro League club Abha on a two-year contract.

=== Newell's Old Boys ===
On 12 July 2025, Noguera returned to Argentina to join Newell's Old Boys as a free agent.

== Career statistics ==
As of match played 6 October 2025

Appearances and goals by club, season and competition
Club	Season	League			Cup		Continental		Other		Total	
Club	Season	Division	Apps	Goals	Apps	Goals	Apps	Goals	Apps	Goals	Apps	Goals
Banfield	2012–13	Primera B Nacional	27	7	2	0	—		—		8	0
Banfield	2013–14	Primera B Nacional	38	3	—		—		—		11	0
Banfield	2014	Argentine Primera División	12	0	2	2	—		—		28	2
Banfield	2015	Argentine Primera División	16	1	1	0	—		—		44	5
Banfield	Total		93	11	5	2	—		—		98	13
Santos	2016	Série A	7	1	—		—		—		7	1
Santos	2017	Série A	7	0	0	0	2 (Note: Appearance(s) in Copa Libertadores)	0	0	0	9	0
Santos	Total		14	1	0	0	2	0	0	0	16	1
Estudiantes (loan)	2017–18	Argentine Primera División	3	0	—		—		—		3	0
Estudiantes (loan)	2018–19	Argentine Primera División	11	2	1	0	2	0	—		14	2
Estudiantes (loan)	Total		14	2	1	0	2	0	—		17	2
Gimnàstic (loan)	2018–19	Segunda División	16	0	—		—		—		16	0
Ponferradina (loan)	2019–20	Segunda División	7	0	2	0	—		—		9	0
Estudiantes	2021	Argentine Primera División	25	4	—		—		12	2	37	6
Estudiantes	2022	Argentine Primera División	20	1	2	0	11	0	11	0	44	1
Estudiantes	Total		45	5	2	0	11	0	23	2	81	7
Nacional	2023	Uruguayan Primera División	21	1	—		6	2	1	0	28	3
Abha	2023–24	Saudi Professional League	30	3	2	0	—		—		32	3
Abha	2024–25	Saudi First Division	22	2	1	0	—		—		23	2
Abha	Total		52	5	3	0	—		—		55	5
Newell's Old Boys	2025	Argentine Primera División	4	0	2	0	—		—		6	0
Career total			256	25	15	2	21	2	24	2	326	31
