= Martín Luciano =

Argentine footballer

Personal information
- Full name: Martín Abel Luciano
- Date of birth: 12 August 2003 (age 23)
- Place of birth: Rosario, Argentina
- Height: 1.77 m (5 ft 10 in)
- Position: Left-back

Team information
- Current team: Newell's Old Boys
- Number: 3

Youth career
- 2008–2016: Provincial
- 2016–2021: Newell's Old Boys

Senior career*
Years	Team	Apps	(Gls)
2021–	Newell's Old Boys	46	(0)
2023–2024	→ Godoy Cruz (loan)	15	(0)
- * Club domestic league appearances and goals as of 17:20, 8 May 2026 (UTC)

Martín Abel Luciano (born 12 August 2003) is an Argentine professional footballer who plays as a left-back for Newell's Old Boys.

== Career ==
Having started his football as a 5 years old at Club Atlético Provincial in Rosario, Santa Fe, Martín Luciano joined Newell's Old Boys in 2016.

Martín Luciano made his professional debut for Newell's Old Boys on 8 November 2021, replacing Francisco González at the 71st minute of a 1–0 home Superliga win against Club Atlético Unión. Whilst playing as a left-back throughout is formation, he was used as a right midfielder for this first game.
