= Hassan Al-Ali (footballer) =

Saudi Arabian footballer

Personal information
- Full name: Hassan Hashem Mohammed Al-Ali
- Date of birth: 10 February 2002 (age 24)
- Place of birth: Al-Hasa, Saudi Arabia
- Height: 1.74 m (5 ft 9 in)
- Position: Striker

Team information
- Current team: Neom
- Number: 11

Youth career
- –2017: Al-Qarah
- 2017–2021: Al-Ahli

Senior career*
Years	Team	Apps	(Gls)
2021–2023	Al-Ahli	37	(6)
2023–2024	Abha	21	(3)
2024–	Neom	0	(0)

International career
2017–2019	Saudi Arabia U17		
2019–2020	Saudi Arabia U20		
2023–	Saudi Arabia U23		
- * Club domestic league appearances and goals as of 3 May 2024

Hassan Al-Ali (Arabic: حسن العلي; born 10 February 2002) is a Saudi Arabian footballer who plays as a striker for Neom.

== Career ==
Al-Ali started his career at the youth teams of hometown club Al-Qarah. On 18 October 2017, Al-Ali joined Al-Ahli. On 7 August 2020, he signed his first professional contract with Al-Ahli. He was first called up to the first team in January 2021 following injuries to Omar Al Somah and Muhannad Assiri. He made his first-team debut on 31 January 2021 in the 2–2 draw against Al-Batin. On 7 September 2023, Al-Ali joined Abha on a two-year deal. On 16 August 2024, Al-Ali joined Neom.

== Career statistics ==
=== Club ===
As of 27 May 2024

Club	Season	League		King Cup		Asia		Other		Total	
Club	Season	Apps	Goals	Apps	Goals	Apps	Goals	Apps	Goals	Apps	Goals
Al-Ahli	2020–21	3	0	0	0	0	0	—		3	0
Al-Ahli	2021–22	2	0	0	0	—		—		2	0
Al-Ahli	2022–23	28	6	—		—		—		28	6
Al-Ahli	2023–24	4	0	0	0	—		—		4	0
Al-Ahli	Total	37	6	0	0	0	0	0	0	37	6
Abha	2023–24	21	3	2	0	—		—		23	3
Career totals		58	9	2	0	0	0	0	0	60	9
