= Luca Regiardo =

Argentine professional footballer

Personal information
- Date of birth: 23 October 2006 (age 20)
- Place of birth: Arequito, Argentina
- Position: Defensive midfielder

Team information
- Current team: Newell's Old Boys

Youth career
- –2021: 9 de Julio de Arequito
- 2021–2024: Newell's Old Boys

Senior career*
Years	Team	Apps	(Gls)
2024–	Newell's Old Boys	43	(1)
- * Club domestic league appearances and goals as of 17:32, 3 October 2026 (UTC)

Luca Regiardo (born 23 October 2006) is an Argentine professional footballer who plays as a defensive midfielder for Newell's Old Boys.

== Career ==
Born in Arequito, he was with his hometown team, 9 de Julio de Arequito, and joined Newell's Old Boys in 2021 following a brief trial. Primarily a defensive midfielder, he also played as a central-defender as a youth player.

Regiardo made his professional debut for Newell's Old Boys in December 2024 against Talleres, at the age of 18 years-old. By 2025, he was a regular in the first-team. He signed a new three-year contract with the club the following year and began to captain the club on occasion. Captaining the club against Boca Juniors in August 2026, he scored his first league goal in a 2-2 draw.
