= Alejo Montero =

Argentine footballer

Alejo Gaston Montero
Personal information
- Full name: Alejo Gastón Montero
- Date of birth: 5 May 1998 (age 28)
- Place of birth: Buenos Aires, Argentina
- Position: Midfielder

Team information
- Current team: Newell's Old Boys
- Number: 4

Youth career
- 2009–2019: Vélez

Senior career*
Years	Team	Apps	(Gls)
2019	Vélez Sarsfield	1	(0)
2019–2025	Agropecuario	150	(9)
2025–	Newell's	28	(0)
- * Club domestic league appearances and goals as of 17:15, 25 November 2025 (UTC)

Alejo Gastón Montero (born 5 May 1998) is an Argentine professional footballer who plays as a midfielder for Newell's Old Boys.

== Career ==
Montero started his career with Vélez Sarsfield, having joined them in February 2009. Gabriel Heinze promoted the midfielder into the club's senior squad during 2018–19, initially selecting him as an unused substitute for a fixture with River Plate on 3 February 2019. A 1–1 draw with Huracán on 8 February saw Montero make his professional debut, coming off the bench in stoppage time in place of Leandro Fernández.

In July 2019, Montero left Vélez to join Primera B Nacional's Agropecuario on a free transfer. Vélez denied the latter, saying they had agreed a new contract with the player. However, Montero claimed that they had broken AFA rules which allowed him to depart. Montero filed a recurso de amparo court complaint for freedom of action which was initially denied, though the case would subsequently be won by him via an appeal; the AFA declared him a free player on 12 September, which Vélez appealed themselves. A month later, in October, Montero scored his first senior goal in a 1–1 draw with Independiente Rivadavia.

On 25 January 2025, Montero returned to the Argentine Primera División, joining Newell's Old Boys on a three-year contract.

== Career statistics ==
As of 28 June 2020.

Club statistics
Club	Season	League			Cup		Continental		Other		Total	
Club	Season	Division	Apps	Goals	Apps	Goals	Apps	Goals	Apps	Goals	Apps	Goals
Vélez Sarsfield	2018–19	Primera División	1	0	0	0	—		0	0	1	0
Agropecuario	2019–20	Primera B Nacional	16	1	0	0	—		0	0	16	1
Career total			17	1	0	0	—		0	0	17	1
