= Giovani Chiaverano =

Argentine footballer

Personal information
- Full name: Giovani Chiaverano Meroi
- Date of birth: 21 May 2005 (age 21)
- Place of birth: Ricardone, Santa Fe, Argentina
- Height: 1.73 m (5 ft 8 in)
- Position: Winger

Team information
- Current team: Audax Italiano (on loan from Newell's Old Boys)
- Number: 21

Youth career
- Independiente Ricardone
- Newell's Old Boys

Senior career*
Years	Team	Apps	(Gls)
2023–	Newell's Old Boys	36	(1)
2026–	→ Audax Italiano (loan)	1	(0)
- * Club domestic league appearances and goals as of 31 January 2025

Giovani Chiaverano Meroi (born 21 May 2005) is an Argentine footballer who plays as a winger for Chilean club Audax Italiano on loan from Newell's Old Boys.

== Career ==
Born in Ricardone, Santa Fe, Argentina, Chiaverone was with local club, Independiente de Ricardone, before joining Newell's Old Boys. He made his professional debut in the 0–0 away draw against Platense on 31 October 2023 for the Copa de la Liga Profesional and scored his first goal in the 0–1 away win against Central Córdoba on 25 January 2024.

In January 2026, Chiaverano moved to Chile and joined on loan to Audax Italiano.

== Personal life ==
Giovani is the son of the former footballer Gabriel Chiaverano and the nephew of the racing driver Mauricio Chiaverano. In addition, his brother Gianluca was with the Newell's Old Boys youth ranks.
