= Luciano Herrera =

Argentine footballer

Personal information
- Full name: Luciano Ramón Herrera
- Date of birth: 31 May 1996 (age 30)
- Place of birth: Libertador General San Martín, Jujuy Province, Argentina
- Height: 1.79 m (5 ft 10 in)
- Position: Forward

Team information
- Current team: Pumas UNAM (on loan from Newell's Old Boys)
- Number: 14

Youth career
- Gimnasia y Tiro

Senior career*
Years	Team	Apps	(Gls)
2017–2020	Gimnasia y Tiro	43	(9)
2020–2021	Central Norte	7	(2)
2021–2024	Deportivo Maipú	68	(9)
2021	→ Gimnasia y Tiro (loan)	20	(6)
2024–2026	Defensa y Justicia	39	(2)
2025	→ Newell's Old Boys (loan)	26	(5)
2026–	Newell's Old Boys	16	(0)
2026–	→ Pumas UNAM (loan)	8	(1)
- * Club domestic league appearances and goals as of 17:23, 7 October 2026 (UTC)

Luciano Ramón Herrera (born 31 May 1996) is an Argentine professional footballer who plays as a forward for Liga MX club Pumas UNAM, on loan from AFA Liga Profesional de Fútbol club Newell's Old Boys.

== Club career ==
Herrera came through the youth setup at Gimnasia y Tiro. On 29 November 2017, he came on as a substitute to score the winning goal in a 1–0 victory against Guaraní Antonio Franco. On 30 July 2020, he joined Central Norte for a short spell before joining Primera Nacional club Deportivo Maipú in 2021. In July, he subsequently returned to Gimnasia y Tiro on loan. On 28 November, he scored in a 2–1 win over his former side Central Norte in the Torneo Federal A promotion playoff semi-final.

At the start of 2022, he returned to Deportivo Maipú, scoring his first goal for the club on 12 June against San Telmo. By 2023, he was a regular in the side, helping Maipú to the promotion final of the Primera Nacional, where they lost to Deportivo Riestra. He scored a stoppage time goal against Estudiantes RC in a 1–1 draw in the promotion semi-final that sent his side through.

On 4 January 2024, he joined Liga Profesional club Defensa y Justicia. He quickly established himself as a starter, before scoring his first goal in the top flight on 7 November in a 2–1 win against Argentinos Juniors. In 2025, he was loaned to Newell's Old Boys with an option to buy. On 22 May, he scored against his former club Defensa y Justicia in a 2–0 win in the Copa Argentina.

On 5 January 2026, Newell's exercised their buy option, paying $1 million for 80% of his rights, signing Herrera to a 3-year contract. On 20 July, he moved abroad for the first time in his career to join Liga MX club Pumas UNAM on loan.
