= Brian Calderara =

Argentine association football player (born 1998)

Personal information
- Full name: Brian Alejandro Calderara
- Date of birth: 10 January 1998 (age 28)
- Place of birth: Crespo, Argentina
- Height: 1.70 m (5 ft 7 in)
- Position: Defender

Team information
- Current team: Chacarita Juniors
- Number: 3

Youth career
- –2020: Newell's Old Boys

Senior career*
Years	Team	Apps	(Gls)
2020–2026	Newell's Old Boys	16	(0)
2021	→ Atlético Rafaela (loan)	20	(0)
2022–2023	→ Barracas Central (loan)	62	(2)
2026–	Chacarita Juniors	4	(0)
- * Club domestic league appearances and goals as of 17:39, 17 March 2026 (UTC)

Brian Alejandro Calderara (born 10 January 1998) is an Argentine professional footballer who plays as a defender for Chacarita Juniors.

== Career ==
From Crespo, Entre Ríos, he is a full-back also capable of playing on the left wing. He played for Newell's Old Boys reserve side from 2018. In 2020, was promoted to train with the senior squad and signed a professional contract with the club. He was included amongst the first-team squad for the first time during that season, in a match against River Plate, without making his debut. In 2021, he played on loan at Atlético Rafaela, and in 2022 and 2033 he played for Barracas Central on loan, before returning to his parent club.
