= Valentino Acuña =

Argentine footballer (born 2006)

Personal information
- Full name: Valentino Andrés Acuña
- Date of birth: 27 January 2006 (age 20)
- Place of birth: Rosario, Santa Fe, Argentina
- Height: 1.77 m (5 ft 9 1/2 in)
- Position: Midfielder

Team information
- Current team: Newell's Old Boys
- Number: 10

Youth career
- 2009: Bancaria
- 2010–2024: Newell's Old Boys

Senior career*
Years	Team	Apps	(Gls)
2024–	Newell's Old Boys	21	(1)

International career
2022–2023	Argentina U17	16	(2)
2024–	Argentina U20	10	(0)
Medal record
Men's football
Representing Argentina
FIFA U-20 World Cup
Runner-up	2025 Chile
South American U-20 Championship
Runner-up	2025 Venezuela
- * Club domestic league appearances and goals as of 17:24, 8 May 2026 (UTC)

Valentino Andrés Acuña (born 27 January 2006) is an Argentine footballer currently playing as a midfielder for Newell's Old Boys.

== Club career ==
Born in Rosario in the Santa Fe Province of Argentina, Acuña began his footballing career at the age of three with local side Bancaria. He joined the academy of professional side Newell's Old Boys in 2010, scoring a hat-trick on his youth debut against Brazilian side Botafogo. He signed his first professional contract with the club in December 2022, penning a three-year deal.

== International career ==
Having represented the Argentina under-17 side at the 2023 South American U-17 Championship, where he scored one goal - in a 1–0 win over Bolivia - he was called up to the squad again for the 2023 FIFA U-17 World Cup. In Argentina's second game of the tournament, he scored as his side went on to beat Japan 3–1.

== Personal life ==
In 2014, film director Álex de la Iglesia watched clips of Acuña play on video sharing platform YouTube, and chose to cast him as the body-double of a young Lionel Messi in the biopic film Messi, based on the life of the Argentine international footballer.
