= Meshal Al-Mutairi (footballer, born 1999) =

Saudi Arabian association footballer

Personal information
- Full name: Meshal Ibrahim Al-Mutairi
- Date of birth: 25 March 1999 (age 27)
- Place of birth: Saudi Arabia
- Height: 1.74 m (5 ft 8 1/2 in)
- Position: Winger

Team information
- Current team: Al-Ahli
- Number: 11

Youth career
- Al-Ansar

Senior career*
Years	Team	Apps	(Gls)
2019–2022	Al-Ansar	65	(10)
2022–2023	Ohod	28	(2)
2023–2026	Abha	50	(8)
2026–	Al-Ahli	5	(0)

International career
2018	Saudi Arabia U20		
- * Club domestic league appearances and goals as of 19 October 2026

Meshal Al-Mutairi (Arabic: مشعل المطيري; born 25 March 1999) is a Saudi Arabian professional footballer who plays as a winger for Saudi Pro League Al-Ahli.

== Career ==
Al-Mutairi began his career in the youth setups of Al-Ansar. On 17 July 2019, Al-Mutairi signed his first professional contract with the club. On 31 July 2022, Al-Mutairi joined derby rivals Ohod on a free transfer. On 21 June 2023, Al-Mutairi joined Pro League side Abha on a two-year deal. On 16 September 2023, Al-Mutairi made his debut for Abha in the 3–1 defeat to Al-Ettifaq. He came off the bench replacing Abdulelah Al-Shammeri in the 83rd minute.
