= Newell's Old Boys =

Association football club in Argentina

- Full name: Club Atlético Newell's Old Boys
- Nickname: La Lepra
- Founded: 3 November 1903; 123 years ago
- Ground: Estadio Marcelo Bielsa
- Capacity: 49,000
- Chairman: Ignacio Boero
- Manager: Frank Darío Kudelka
- League: Primera División
- 2025: 27th of 30
- Website: newellsoldboys.com.ar
Home colours	Away colours	Third colours

Club Atlético Newell's Old Boys (Spanish pronunciation: [ˈkluβ aˈtletiko ˈɲuls olˈβojs]) is an Argentine sports club based in Rosario, Santa Fe. The club was founded on 3 November 1903, and is named after English teacher Isaac Newell, one of the pioneers of Argentine football.

A founding member of Liga Rosarina de Football, the club affiliated to the Argentine Football Association (AFA) in 1939. Since then, Newell's Old Boys have taken part in tournaments organised by the body. The club has won six Argentine Primera División championships plus three national cups throughout their history. Newell's have also been twice Copa Libertadores runner-up (in 1988 and 1992).

The club's football stadium is the Estadio Marcelo Bielsa, named after the team's former player and manager Marcelo Bielsa (twice champion, and runner-up of one Copa Libertadores). Newell's play the Rosario derby against Rosario Central, a club with whom they have a huge historical rivalry.

Newell's are also notable for their youth divisions, being one of the clubs with most national titles in AFA's youth tournaments. Players from the club's youth who have represented Argentina at World Cups are Gabriel Batistuta, Éver Banega, Walter Samuel, Américo Gallego, Jorge Valdano, Gabriel Heinze, Roberto Sensini, Mauricio Pochettino, Lionel Scaloni and Maxi Rodríguez, among others. Lionel Messi also played in the club's youth system, but left at a young age to play for Barcelona to seek treatment for his growth hormone deficiency, while Diego Maradona played briefly for the first team in 1993.

Other sports practised at this club are basketball, boxing, field hockey, martial arts, roller skating, volleyball and American football.

== History ==
=== Origins ===
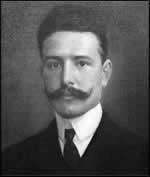
Claudio Newell, founding member of Newell's Old Boys

Club Atlético Newell's Old Boys was established on 3 November 1903. Claudio Newell was one of the founding members. Newell called teachers, pupils and alumni of the school his father had established to sign the act of foundation of the club. The name chosen paid tribute to Isaac Newell's life. The first president was Víctor Heitz.

The name "old boys" refers to former pupils of a school. In fact, the players of the first football team were graduates of the school Isaac Newell had established, the Colegio Comercial Anglicano Argentino.

The colours of the club were taken from the Colegio Comercial Anglicano Argentino emblem (designed by Isaac Newell himself) that were red and black inspired in the colours of the flag of England and the Flag of the German Empire.

Newell's Old Boys is often referred to as "leprosos" ("lepers"). The club got its nickname, the lepers, after playing in a charity match for a leprosy clinic in the 1920s.

=== Liga Rosarina (1905–1930) ===
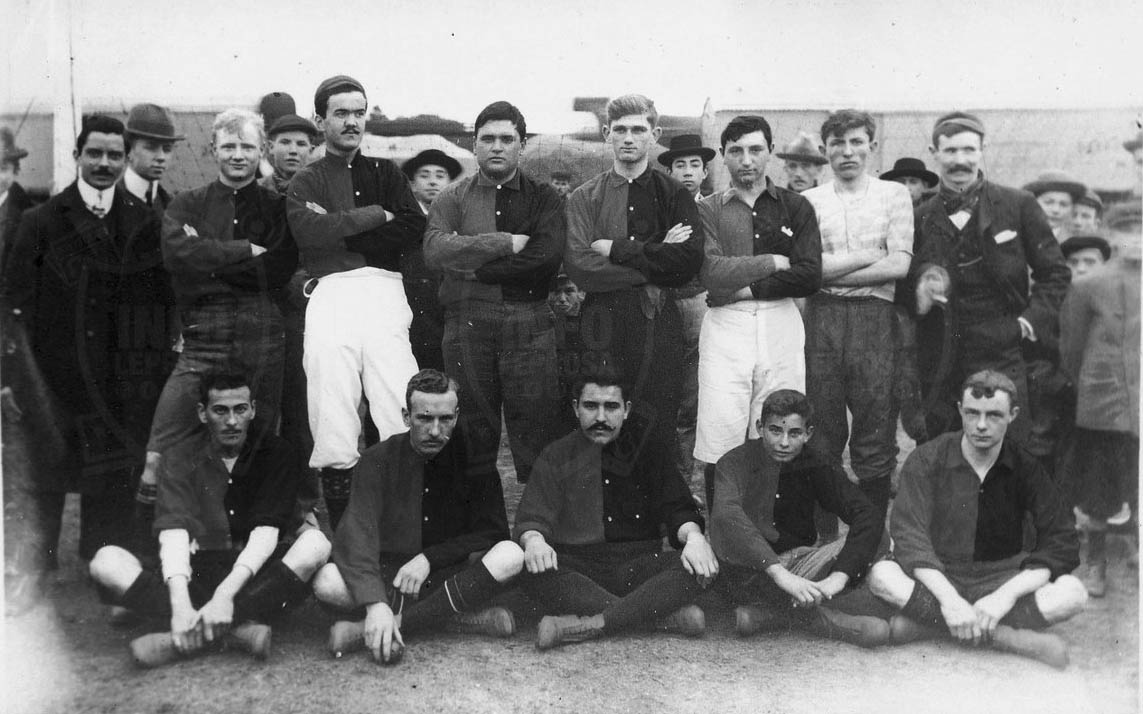
The team that played their first official match on 21 May 1905, v. Argentino

On 30 March 1905, the Liga Rosarina de Football (Rosarian Football League) was established, following a proposal by Newell's president Heitz, who invited representatives of Rosario Athletic, Rosario Central and Atlético Argentino for that purpose. The main objective was to organise a championship, so a trophy was donated by the intendant of Rosario, Santiago Pinasco. The trophy was later named in his honour. Newell's was the winner of the first edition, having won eight games and finishing unbeaten. The team also scored 39 goals, conceding just 4.

Previously, the historic first Rosarino derby had been held. Newell's won 1–0 with a goal scored by Faustino González. The next year Newell's won its second championship.

In 1907, the Liga Rosarina established a second division. The Copa Santiago Pinasco tournament moved to that division and "Copa Nicasio Vila" (named in honour of then mayor of Rosario) was created to be played by the first division teams. Newell's won the first edition of this trophy, which they won a total 9 times between 1907 and 1930.

The Copa de Honor Municipalidad de Buenos Aires allowed teams from Buenos Aires and Rosario to take part in the competition. Newell's won the 1911 edition defeating Porteño 3–2 at the final. Other trophy were teams of both cities played together was the Copa Dr. Carlos Ibarguren, won by Newell's in 1921, defeating Huracán by 3–0.

=== The arrival to Primera División ===
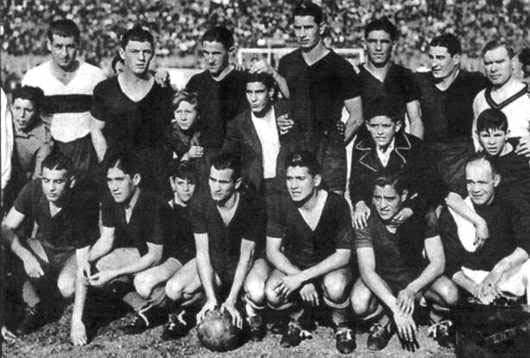
The team that debuted in Primera División in 1939

In 1939, Newell's asked the Argentine Football Association to play in the Primera División championship. The AFA accepted the request, so Newell's played its first tournament in 1939, along with Rosario Central which was also added to the competition. Despite playing in the national tournaments, Newell's continued participating in the regional leagues of Rosario, but with youth amateur players. Newell's debuted in the AFA tournaments on 19 March 1939, defeating San Lorenzo by 2–1. The line-up was: Heredia; Gilli, Soneyro; Sisniega, Perucca, Reynoso; Belén, Fabrini, Gómez, Franco, Sánchez.

=== National titles ===
Newell's Old Boys have won the Primera División championship 6 times (1974 Metropolitano, 1987–88, 1990–91, 1992 Clausura, Apertura 2004 and 2013 Final) and were the runners-up of the Copa Libertadores de América twice (1988 and 1992). The 1990–91 championship was contested between the 1990 Apertura (Newell's) and 1991 Clausura (Boca Juniors) champions, which Newell's won in home-and-away matches. Even though the 1990 Apertura was not considered official by itself, it is considered by Newell's supporters to be their "seventh" championship.

Newell's also won a friendly youth mini-tournament called the Little World Cup in 1988, against River Plate, Milan, Juventus, Real Madrid and Manchester United, and is, together with Boca Juniors, San Lorenzo and Racing Club one of the few Argentine clubs that made a long and successful tour in Europe (in 1949), in which they defeated several important teams such as Valencia, Borussia Mönchengladbach, Real Madrid and the Spanish National "A" Team. These are the only major international achievements of the club until now (although several minor international summer tournaments were won, with the 1943 Copa de Oro Rioplatense standing up). So far the club has not won an official international championship.

Newell's Old Boys is one of a very few teams to have had all their players represent the national team in a single game, when they represented Argentina in a Pre-Olympic Tournament with their undefeated reserve team. It finished third in America, after Brazil and Uruguay.

The team has also contributed a great number of players to the Argentina national team, and exported many players to Europe's top leagues, mostly to Italy and Spain. Among its great players were Gabriel Batistuta, Abel Balbo, Jorge Valdano, Américo Gallego, Mario Zanabria, Gustavo Dezotti, Roberto Sensini, Walter Samuel, Mauricio Pochettino, René Pontoni, Gerardo Martino, Ángel Perucca and several more. It has recently produced Argentine internationals Gabriel Heinze, Maxi Rodríguez, Lionel Messi and Lisandro Martínez.

The club's president is Ignacio Boero, who was elected in December 2025.

== Kit and badge ==
=== Kit Manufacturer ===
Period	Kit manufacturer
1979–1999	(Germany) Adidas
1999–2000	(Spain) Luanvi
2000–2002	(United Kingdom) Mitre
2002–2005	(France) TBS
2005–2015	(Brazil) Topper
2015–2017	(Germany) Adidas
2018–2021	(United Kingdom) Umbro
2022–2023	(Italy) Givova
2024–2026*	(Chile) Aifit

=== Colours and badge ===
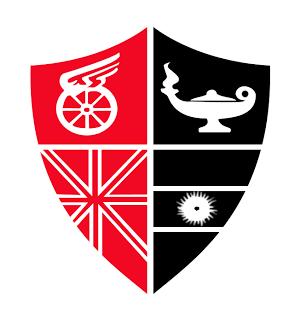
Coat of arms designed for Isaac Newell for his school served as inspiration for NOB shirt colors

The origins of Newell's Old Boys colors can be traced to the 19th century, when Isaac Newell founded the "Colegio Comercial Anglicano Argentino" in 1884. The school's coat of arms had four panels, each depicting a different element, such as Mercury wings, a lamp (representing wisdom), the flag of the United Kingdom, and the flag of Argentina.

The black and red colors used in the coat were extracted from the flags of England (where Newell was born) and the German Empire (country of origin of his wife, Anna Jockinsen).

The red and black colours would be also adopted by the club as its colors. The first NOB emblem was designed by Ernesto Edwards, and (with few variations) has remained since then.

== Stadium ==
The Newell's Old Boys stadium has been in the Parque Independencia neighborhood of Rosario since 1911, and is commonly called El Coloso del Parque (the Colossus of the Independence Park). Its capacity was increased from 31,000 to 42,000 in 1997, and to 49,000 in 2025. On 22 December 2009 the stadium was renamed after Marcelo Bielsa, in honour of the former player and coach of the team.

== Players ==
=== Current squad ===
As of 28 October 2026

Note: Flags indicate national team as defined under FIFA eligibility rules; some limited exceptions apply. Players may hold more than one non-FIFA nationality.

No.	Pos.	Nation	Player
2	DF	ARG	Ian Glavinovich
3	DF	ARG	Martín Luciano
4	DF	ARG	Alejo Montero
5	MF	ARG	Luca Regiardo (captain)
6	DF	ARG	Martín Ortega
7	FW	ARG	Walter Mazzantti (on loan from Independiente)
8	MF	ARG	David Sotelo
9	FW	URU	Matías Cóccaro
10	MF	ARG	Valentino Acuña
15	MF	USA	Alan Soñora
16	DF	ARG	Lucas Carrizo
17	DF	ARG	Lautaro Giannetti
18	FW	ARG	Mateo García
19	MF	ARG	Jerónimo Gómez Mattar
20	MF	ARG	Facundo Guch

No.	Pos.	Nation	Player
21	GK	CHI	Gabriel Arias
22	DF	ARG	Oscar Salomón
23	DF	ARG	Nicolás Goitea (on loan from Mitre)
24	DF	ARG	Franco Escobar
25	DF	ARG	Bruno Cabrera
26	MF	ARG	Rodrigo Herrera
27	MF	ARG	Lucas Gómez (on loan from Argentinos Juniors)
28	DF	ARG	Jerónimo Russo
29	MF	ARG	Marcelo Esponda
30	GK	ARG	Josué Reinatti
31	GK	ARG	Francisco Sciarini
32	FW	ARG	Santiago Solari (on loan from Racing Avellaneda)
33	FW	ARG	Walter Núñez (on loan from Montevideo City Torque)
35	MF	ARG	Blas Benedetto
36	FW	ARG	Francisco Scarpeccio
39	FW	ARG	Thomas Ríos
99	FW	URU	Juan Ignacio Ramírez

=== Reserve squad ===
Note: Flags indicate national team as defined under FIFA eligibility rules; some limited exceptions apply. Players may hold more than one non-FIFA nationality.

No.	Pos.	Nation	Player
—	DF	PAR	Saúl Salcedo
—	MF	ARG	Fabricio Tirado

=== Out on loan ===
Note: Flags indicate national team as defined under FIFA eligibility rules; some limited exceptions apply. Players may hold more than one non-FIFA nationality.

No.	Pos.	Nation	Player
12	GK	PAR	Juan Espínola (at Barracas Central until 31 December 2026)
14	DF	URU	Armando Méndez (at Guaraní until 31 December 2026)
27	FW	ARG	Luciano Herrera (at UNAM until 30 June 2027)

No.	Pos.	Nation	Player
31	GK	ARG	Faustino Piotti (at Sol de América until 31 December 2026)
38	FW	ARG	Giovani Chiaverano (at Audax Italiano until 31 December 2026)
49	FW	ARG	Julián Contrera (at Sarmiento (Junín) until 31 December 2026)

=== Individual records ===
==== Most appearances ====
No.	Player	Pos.	Tenure	Match.
1	(Argentina) Gerardo Martino	MF	1980–90, 1991–94, 1995–96	505
2	(Argentina) Norberto Scoponi	GK	1982–94	407
3	(Argentina) Juan Manuel Llop	MF	1981–84, 1985–94	399
4	(Argentina) Fabián Basualdo	DF	1982–88	307
5	(Argentina) José O. Berta	MF	1970–78	299

==== Top scorers ====
No.	Player	Pos.	Tenure	Goals
1	(Argentina) Víctor Ramos	FW	1978–84, 1987–89	104
2	(Argentina) Maxi Rodríguez	FW	1999–2002, 2012–17, 2019–21	94
3	(Argentina) Santiago Santamaría	FW	1970–74, 1980–82, 1984	90
4	(Argentina) Alfredo Obberti	FW	1970–72, 1974–75	89
5	(Argentina) Ignacio Scocco	FW	2004–06, 2012–13, 2014–17, 2020–21	85

=== Current coaching staff ===
Position	Staff
Head coach	(Argentina) Frank Darío Kudelka
Assistant coach	(Argentina) Federico Hernández
Assistant coach	(Argentina) Tomás González
Fitness coach	(Argentina) Mariano Lisanti
Goalkeeping coach	(Argentina) Leonardo Cortizo
Doctor	(Argentina) Pablo Sogne
Kit man	(Argentina) Francisco Aquilano
Kit man	(Argentina) Pablo Testa

Last updated: 29 April 2025
Source: Cuerpo Técnico

== Managers ==
- (Paraguay) Manuel Fleitas Solich (June 1944 – 1945)
- (Scotland) William Reaside (1947)
- (Argentina) René Pontoni (1956–57)
- (Argentina) Ángel Tulio Zof (1965–67; 1969)
- (Argentina) César Luis Menotti (1971)
- (Argentina) Raúl Oscar Belén (1973)
- (Argentina) Juan Eulogio Urriolabeitía (1973)
- (Argentina) José Yudica (1976–77; 1978–79)
- (Uruguay) Luis Cubilla (1 January 1980 – 31 December 1980)
- (Argentina) Jorge Solari (1983–87)
- (Argentina) José Yudica (1987–90)
- (Argentina) Marcelo Bielsa (1990–1992)
- (Argentina) Eduardo Luján Manera (1993)
- (Argentina) Roque Alfaro (1993)
- (Argentina) Jorge Solari (1993)
- (Argentina) Mario Zanabria (1 July 1996 – 31 December 1997)
- (Croatia) Mirko Jozić (1998)
- (Argentina) Ricardo Dabrowski (1 January 1998 – 31 December 1998)
- (Argentina) Andrés Rebottaro (1999–00)
- (Argentina) Juan Manuel Llop (1 January 2001 – 1 January 2002)
- (Argentina) Julio Alberto Zamora (2002)
- (Argentina) Héctor Veira (2002–04)
- (Argentina) Américo Gallego (2004)
- (Chile) Juvenal Olmos (2005)
- (Argentina) Nery Pumpido (1 October 2005 – 1 July 2006)
- (Argentina) Pablo Marini (1 March 2007 – 30 September 2007)
- (Argentina) R. Caruso Lombardi (1 September 2007 – 2 August 2008)
- (Argentina) Fernando Gamboa (1 August 2008 – 1 January 2009)
- (Argentina) Roberto Sensini (1 January 2009 – 10 April 2011)
- (Argentina) Javier Torrente (18 April 2011 – 27 September 2011)
- (Argentina) Diego Cagna (29 September 2011 – 22 December 2011)
- (Argentina) Gerardo Martino (29 December 2011 – 22 July 2013)
- (Argentina) Alfredo Berti (24 July 2013 – 11 April 2014)
- (Argentina) Ricardo Lunari (11 April 2014 – 2014)
- (Argentina) Américo Gallego (2014 – 1 June 2015)
- (Argentina) Lucas Bernardi (16 June 2015 – 15 February 2016)
- (Argentina) Diego Osella (February 2016 – June 2017)
- (Argentina) Juan Manuel Llop (2017–2018)
- (Argentina) Omar De Felippe (2018)
- (Argentina) (Venezuela) Héctor Bidoglio (2018–2019)
- (Argentina) Frank Darío Kudelka (2019–2021)
- (Argentina) Germán Burgos (2021)
- (Argentina) Fernando Gamboa (2021)
- (Argentina) Adrián Taffarel (2021)
- (Argentina) Javier Sanguinetti (2022)
- (Argentina) Adrián Coria (2022)
- (Argentina) Gabriel Heinze (2023)
- (Uruguay) Mauricio Larriera (2024)
- (Argentina) Sebastián Méndez (2024)
- (Argentina) Ricardo Lunari (2024)
- (Argentina) Mariano Soso (2024–2025)
- (Argentina) Cristian Fabbiani (2025)
- (Argentina) Lucas Bernardi (2025)
- (Argentina) Favio Orsi - (Argentina) Sergio Gómez (2026)
- (Argentina) Frank Darío Kudelka (2026-)

== Honours ==
=== Senior titles ===
Keys

- Record
- ^{(s)} Shared record

Type	Competition	Titles	Winning years
National (League)	Primera División	6	1974 Metropolitano, 1987–88, 1990–91, 1992 Clausura, 2004 Apertura, 2013 Final
National (Cups)	Copa de Honor MCBA	1	1911
National (Cups)	Copa Ibarguren	1	1921
National (Cups)	Copa Adrián C. Escobar	1	1949

=== Regional ===
- Liga Rosarina
  - Copa Nicasio Vila (9): 1907, 1909, 1910, 1911, 1913, 1918, 1921, 1922, 1929
  - Copa Damas de Caridad (1): 1913
- Asociación Rosarina: (Note: In 1939 the senior squad of Newell's Old Boys began to participate in the Argentine's top division, Primera División. From then on, Newell's has taken part in regional tournaments by the ARF with reserve teams only.)
  - Torneo Luciano Molinas (4): 1931, 1933, 1934, 1935
  - Copa Estímulo (2): 1925, 1933

=== Friendly ===
- Torneo Internacional Nocturno (1): 1943
- Copa Diário La Capital Argentina (1): 1985
  - Runners-up: 1994
