= 2018–19 Al-Ahli Saudi FC season =

Al-Ahli
2018–19 season
- President: Majed Al-Nefeai (until 31 December 2018); Abdullah Batterjee (from 1 January 2019)
- Manager: Pablo Guede (until 5 February); Jorge Fossati (from 8 February until 17 April); Yousef Anbar (from 17 April)
- Stadium: King Abdullah Sports City
- Pro League: 4th
- King Cup: Round of 16 (knocked out by Al-Wehda)
- Champions League: Round of 16
- Arab Club Champions Cup: Semi-finals (knocked out by Al-Hilal)
- Top goalscorer: League: Djaniny (20); All: Omar Al Somah (27)
- Highest home attendance: 42,880 vs Al-Ittihad (1 March 2019)
- Lowest home attendance: 1,605 vs Ohod (11 January 2019)
- Average home league attendance: 18,816
Home colours	Away colours	Third colours
- All statistics correct as of 4 December 2018.

The 2018–19 season was Al-Ahli's 43rd consecutive season in the top flight of Saudi football and 81st year in existence as a football club. Along with the Pro League, the club competed in the King Cup, Arab Club Champions Cup, and the Champions League. The season covers the period from 1 July 2018 to 30 June 2019.

== Players ==
=== Squad information ===
As of 7 January 2019

Note: Flags indicate national team as defined under FIFA eligibility rules; some limited exceptions apply. Players may hold more than one non-FIFA nationality.

No.	Pos.	Nation	Player
1	GK	KSA	Yasser Al-Mosailem
2	DF	KSA	Saeed Al-Muwallad
3	DF	KSA	Mohammed Al-Fatil
4	DF	ESP	Alexis
5	MF	CHI	Claudio Baeza
6	MF	BRA	Souza
7	MF	KSA	Salman Al-Moasher
8	MF	KSA	Taisir Al-Jassim (vice-captain)
9	FW	SYR	Omar Al Somah
11	MF	KSA	Housain Al-Mogahwi
13	DF	EGY	Mohamed Abdel Shafy (3rd captain)
14	FW	KSA	Muhannad Assiri
16	MF	KSA	Nooh Al-Mousa
17	DF	CHI	Paulo Díaz
18	MF	CHA	Othman Alhaj
21	FW	CPV	Djaniny
23	DF	KSA	Abdullah Hassoun
24	DF	KSA	Hussein Abdulghani (captain)
25	DF	KSA	Motaz Hawsawi
26	DF	KSA	Fares Al-Khoraimi

No.	Pos.	Nation	Player
27	DF	KSA	Mohammed Al-Zubaidi
28	MF	KSA	Ayman Al-Khulaif
29	FW	KSA	Abdulrahman Ghareeb
30	DF	KSA	Hani Al-Sebyani
32	DF	KSA	Faisal Darisi
33	GK	KSA	Mohammed Al-Owais
35	MF	KSA	Yousef Al-Harbi
37	DF	KSA	Abdulbasit Hindi
38	MF	KSA	Fahad Majrashi
40	MF	KSA	Yahya Al-Qarni
45	MF	KSA	Abdulfattah Asiri
48	DF	KSA	Manaf Abo Yabes
49	MF	KSA	Firas Al-Ghamdi
55	DF	KSA	Baker Eissa
66	GK	KSA	Basem Atallah
71	MF	ROU	Nicolae Stanciu
75	DF	BRA	Aderlan Santos
77	MF	KSA	Omar Al-Zayni
80	MF	KSA	Bader Munshi
99	FW	KSA	Safi Al-Zaqrati

== Transfers ==
=== In ===
==== Summer ====
No.	Pos	Player	Transferred From	Fee	Date	Source
19	AM	(Egypt) Abdallah Said	(Egypt) Al Ahly	€850,000	23 May 2018	
13	LB	(Egypt) Mohamed Abdel Shafy	(Saudi Arabia) Al-Fateh	End of loan	30 May 2018	
20	RM	(Saudi Arabia) Islam Seraj	(Saudi Arabia) Al-Faisaly	End of loan	30 May 2018	
30	CB	(Saudi Arabia) Saeed Al-Robeai	(Saudi Arabia) Al-Faisaly	End of loan	30 May 2018	
35	DM	(Saudi Arabia) Rayan Al-Harbi	(Saudi Arabia) Al-Tai	End of loan	30 May 2018	
40	RM	(Saudi Arabia) Raed Al-Ghamdi	(Saudi Arabia) Ohod	End of loan	30 May 2018	
47	RM	(Saudi Arabia) Mustafa Bassas	(Saudi Arabia) Ohod	End of loan	30 May 2018	
49	LM	(Saudi Arabia) Ahmed Al-Zain	(Saudi Arabia) Al-Fayha	End of loan	30 May 2018	
80	DM	(Saudi Arabia) Ryan Al-Mousa	(Saudi Arabia) Al-Taawoun	End of loan	30 May 2018	
	CB	(Saudi Arabia) Abdullah Al-Khateeb	(Saudi Arabia) Al-Khaleej	End of loan	30 May 2018	
	CB	(Saudi Arabia) Hamed Al-Sherif	(Saudi Arabia) Hajer	End of loan	30 May 2018	
16	CM	(Saudi Arabia) Nooh Al-Mousa	(Saudi Arabia) Al-Fateh	Undisclosed	18 June 2018	
4	CB	(Spain) Alexis	(Spain) Alavés	Free	20 June 2018	
10	LM	(Spain) José Manuel Jurado	(Spain) Espanyol	Free	20 June 2018	
21	ST	(Cape Verde) Djaniny	(Mexico) Santos Laguna	€10,250,000	18 July 2018	
27	LB	(Saudi Arabia) Mohammed Al-Zubaidi	(Saudi Arabia) Al-Ettifaq	Swap	31 July 2018	
77	DM	(Saudi Arabia) Omar Al-Zayni	(Saudi Arabia) Al-Entesar	Free	12 August 2018	
17	RB	(Chile) Paulo Díaz	(Argentina) San Lorenzo	€2,630,000	15 August 2018	
6	DM	(Brazil) Souza	(Turkey) Fenerbahçe	€12,000,000	23 August 2018	

==== Winter ====
No.	Pos	Player	Transferred From	Fee	Date	Source
18	ST	(Chad) Othman Alhaj	(Saudi Arabia) Jeddah	Free	7 January 2019	
24	LB	(Saudi Arabia) Hussein Abdulghani	(Saudi Arabia) Ohod	Free	14 January 2019	
15	AM	(Saudi Arabia) Abdulaziz Al-Shahrani	(Saudi Arabia) Damac	Undisclosed	22 January 2019	
5	CM	(Chile) Claudio Baeza	(Chile) Colo-Colo	€3,200,000	23 January 2019	
75	CB	(Brazil) Aderlan Santos	(Spain) Valencia CF	€5,000,000	24 January 2019	
8	CM	(Saudi Arabia) Taisir Al-Jassim	(Saudi Arabia) Al-Wehda	Loan return	26 January 2019	
71	AM	(Romania) Nicolae Stanciu	(Czech Republic) Sparta Prague	€10,000,000	28 January 2019	

=== Out ===
==== Summer ====
No.	Pos	Player	Transferred To	Fee	Date	Source
20	DM	(Tunisia) Mohamed Ben Amor	(Tunisia) Étoile du Sahel	Loan return	15 May 2018	
88	RM	(Egypt) Moamen Zakaria	(Egypt) Al Ahly	Loan return	15 May 2018	
4	DM	(Saudi Arabia) Waleed Bakshween	(Saudi Arabia) Al-Wehda	Free	27 May 2018	
10	AM	(Greece) Giannis Fetfatzidis	(Greece) Olympiacos	Free	30 May 2018	
20	ST	(Saudi Arabia) Islam Seraj	(Saudi Arabia) Ohod	Free	1 June 2018	
	DM	(Saudi Arabia) Rayan Al-Harbi	(Saudi Arabia) Al-Ain	Free	13 June 2018	
77	RB	(Saudi Arabia) Amiri Kurdi	(Greece) Panionios	Free	1 July 2018	
19	CM	(Brazil) Claudemir	(Portugal) Braga	Free	9 July 2018	
27	LB	(Saudi Arabia) Hamdan Al-Shamrani	(Saudi Arabia) Al-Faisaly	Free	11 July 2018	
15	LM	(Saudi Arabia) Saleh Al-Amri	(Saudi Arabia) Al-Wehda	Free	13 July 2018	
31	LB	(Saudi Arabia) Mansoor Al-Harbi	(Saudi Arabia) Al-Ittihad	Free	26 July 2018	
	RB	(Saudi Arabia) Sanousi Hawsawi	(Saudi Arabia) Al-Jabalain	Free	28 July 2018	
44	GK	(Saudi Arabia) Ayman Al-Hussaini	(Saudi Arabia) Al-Tai	Free	29 July 2018	
30	CB	(Saudi Arabia) Saeed Al-Robeai	(Saudi Arabia) Al-Ettifaq	Swap	31 July 2018	
	CB	(Saudi Arabia) Hamed Al-Sherif	(Saudi Arabia) Al-Orobah	Free	1 August 2018	
80	DM	(Saudi Arabia) Ryan Al-Mousa	(Saudi Arabia) Al-Taawoun	Free	1 August 2018	
21	CB	(Saudi Arabia) Ageel Balghaith	(Saudi Arabia) Al-Faisaly	Free	3 August 2018	
42	LM	(Brazil) Leonardo	(United Arab Emirates) Al Wahda	Free	6 August 2018	
26	LM	(Saudi Arabia) Abdulmohsen Al-Subhi	(Saudi Arabia) Al-Batin	Free	15 August 2018	
5	DM	(Australia) Mark Milligan	(Scotland) Hibernian	Free	18 August 2018	
35	ST	(Saudi Arabia) Mohammed Al-Harthi	(Saudi Arabia) Al-Mujazzal	Free	25 August 2018	
36	GK	(Saudi Arabia) Raghid Al-Najjar	(Saudi Arabia) Al-Shabab	Free	23 August 2018	
40	ST	(Saudi Arabia) Raed Al-Ghamdi	(Saudi Arabia) Ohod	Free	25 August 2018	

==== Winter ====
No.	Pos	Player	Transferred To	Fee	Date	Source
19	AM	(Egypt) Abdallah Said	(Egypt) Pyramids	Free	4 January 2019	
41	ST	(Saudi Arabia) Mansour Al-Muwallad	(Saudi Arabia) Al-Taawoun	Free	4 February 2019	
	AM	(Yemen) Ahmed Ba Saeed	(Saudi Arabia) Al-Faisaly	Free	4 February 2019	

=== Loan out ===
==== Summer ====
No.	Pos	Player	Loaned To	Start	End	Source
2	RB	(Saudi Arabia) Ali Al-Zubaidi	(Saudi Arabia) Al-Raed	8 June 2018	30 June 2019	
	CB	(Saudi Arabia) Abdullah Al-Khateeb	(Saudi Arabia) Al-Khaleej	16 July 2018	30 June 2019	
49	LM	(Saudi Arabia) Ahmed Al-Zain	(Saudi Arabia) Al-Qadsiah	22 July 2018	30 June 2019	
	AM	(Saudi Arabia) Nasser Al-Daajani	(Portugal) Fátima	31 July 2018	25 January 2019	
	GK	(Saudi Arabia) Mohammed Al Rubaie	(Saudi Arabia) Al-Batin	2 August 2018	30 June 2019	
8	CM	(Saudi Arabia) Taisir Al-Jassim	(Saudi Arabia) Al-Wehda	19 August 2018	26 January 2019	
16	DM	(Saudi Arabia) Maher Othman	(Saudi Arabia) Al-Tai	23 August 2018	30 June 2019	
18	CM	(Saudi Arabia) Ali Al-Asmari	(Saudi Arabia) Ohod	25 August 2018	30 June 2019	

==== Winter ====
No.	Pos	Player	Loaned To	Start	End	Source
	AM	(Saudi Arabia) Nasser Al-Daajani	(Saudi Arabia) Al-Taawoun	25 January 2019	30 June 2020	
70	CB	(Saudi Arabia) Mohammed Bassas	(Saudi Arabia) Al-Taawoun	4 February 2019	30 June 2019	
50	DM	(Saudi Arabia) Abdullah Majrashi	(Saudi Arabia) Ohod	4 February 2019	30 June 2019	

== Pre-season and friendlies ==
27 July 2018 Friendly	Al-Ahli (Saudi Arabia)	2–1	(Austria) Mattersburg	Mattersburg, Austria
17:00 CEST	Al-Mousa 12'; Al-Moasher 43'	Report	69'

28 July 2018 Friendly	Al-Ahli (Saudi Arabia)	1–1	(Algeria) Paradou	Mattersburg, Austria
17:00 CEST	Djaniny 60'	Report	30'

6 August 2018 Friendly	Al-Ahli (Saudi Arabia)	3–3	(Austria) Lafnitz	Lafnitz, Austria
18:30 CEST	Al Somah 34'; Asiri 65'; Al-Mogahwi 85'		62'; 72'; 87'

16 August 2018 Friendly	Al-Ahli (Saudi Arabia)	1–0	(Saudi Arabia) Jeddah	Jeddah, Saudi Arabia
19:30 AST	Al Somah 55'	Report		Stadium: Reserve Stadium in King Abdullah Sports City

== Competitions ==
=== Overview ===
Competition	Record								Started round	Final position / round	First match	Last match
Competition	G	W	D	L	GF	GA	GD	Win %	Started round	Final position / round	First match	Last match
Professional League	30	17	4	9	68	41	+27	56.67	—	—	1 September 2018	16 May 2019
King Cup	3	2	1	0	6	1	+5	66.67	Round of 32	Round of 16	5 January 2019	23 January 2019
Arab Club Champions Cup	8	5	2	1	12	5	+7	62.50	Round of 32	Semi-finals	25 August 2018	15 April 2019
Champions League	6	3	0	3	7	7	+0	50.00	Group Stage	In Progress	5 March 2019	In Progress
Total	47	27	7	13	93	54	+39	57.45				

Updated to match played 20 May 2019
Source: Competitions

=== Pro League ===
==== League table ====
Pos	Team	Pld	W	D	L	GF	GA	GD	Pts	Qualification or relegation
2	Al-Hilal	30	21	6	3	66	33	+33	69	Qualification for AFC Champions League group stage (Note: Al-Taawoun qualified for the AFC Champions League group stage as 2019 King Cup winners.)
3	Al-Taawoun	30	16	8	6	61	31	+30	56	Qualification for AFC Champions League group stage
4	Al-Ahli	30	17	4	9	68	41	+27	55	Qualification for AFC Champions League play-off round
5	Al-Shabab	30	15	9	6	39	25	+14	54	Qualification for Arab Club Champions Cup
6	Al-Faisaly	30	12	7	11	51	47	+4	43	

Source: spl.com
Rules for classification: 1) Points; 2) Head-to-head points; 3) Head-to-head goal difference; 4) Total goal difference; 5) Total goals scored; 6) Play-off (only for deciding champion, relegation and AFC competitions participation).

==== Results summary ====
Overall								Home						Away					
Pld	W	D	L	GF	GA	GD	Pts	W	D	L	GF	GA	GD	W	D	L	GF	GA	GD
30	17	4	9	68	41	+27	55	7	3	5	32	18	+14	10	1	4	36	23	+13

Last updated: 16 May 2019.
Source: Competitive matches

==== Results by round ====
Round	1	2	3	4	5	6	7	8	9	10	11	12	13	14	15	16	17	18	19	20	21	22	23	24	25	26	27	28	29	30
Ground	H	A	H	H	H	A	H	A	H	A	H	A	H	A	A	H	A	A	A	H	A	H	A	A	H	A	H	H	A	H
Result	D	W	W	W	W	L	W	W	L	W	D	D	L	L	L	W	W	W	W	L	L	D	W	W	L	W	L	W	W	W
Position	7	5	4	3	2	3	3	2	3	3	3	3	4	5	5	4	4	4	3	4	5	5	5	5	5	5	5	5	5	4

Updated to match(es) played on 16 May 2019. Source: Competitive matches
A = Away; H = Home; W = Win; D = Draw; L = Loss

==== Matches ====
All times are local, AST (UTC+3).

Win Draw Loss Postponed

1 September 2018 1	Al-Ahli	1–1	Al-Taawoun	Jeddah
19:20	Al-Mowalad (yellow card) 36'; Al-Mogahwi 49'; Souza (yellow card) 50'	Report	Tawamba 24'; Al-Mousa (yellow card) 51'; Al-Olayan (yellow card) 73'; Al-Zubaidi (yellow card) 90+1'	Stadium: King Abdullah Sports City; Attendance: 21,970; Referee: Björn Kuipers (Netherlands)

14 September 2018 2	Ohod	0–2	Al-Ahli	Medina
19:05	Haj Mohamad (yellow card) 29'; Attiyah (yellow card) 78'; Hazazi (yellow card) 81'	Report	Souza (yellow card) 14'; Djaniny 35'; Alexis (red card) 60'; Assiri 72'	Stadium: Prince Mohammed bin Abdul Aziz Stadium; Attendance: 18,056; Referee: Simon Lee Evans (Wales)

21 September 2018 3	Al-Ahli	2–0	Al-Hazem	Jeddah
20:35	Al-Mogahwi 3'; Al Somah 90+4'	Report	Muralha (yellow card) 46'; Alemão (yellow card) 75'; Al-Qeshtah (yellow card) 80'	Stadium: King Abdullah Sports City; Attendance: 41,315; Referee: Szymon Marciniak (Poland)

29 September 2018 4	Al-Ahli	2–0	Al-Batin	Jeddah
20:35	Said 15', (yellow card) 34'; Al-Mousa 53'	Report		Stadium: King Abdullah Sports City; Attendance: 13,732; Referee: Ravshan Irmatov (Uzbekistan)

5 October 2018 5	Al-Ahli	2–0	Al-Faisaly	Jeddah
18:50	Al Somah 10'; Al-Mowalad (yellow card) 33'; Jurado 45+2'	Report	Majrashi (yellow card) 62'; Balghaith (red card) 64'	Stadium: King Abdullah Sports City; Attendance: 17,466; Referee: Pol van Boekel (Netherlands)

20 October 2018 6	Al-Ettifaq	6–2	Al-Ahli	Dammam
17:50	Al-Robeai 8', (yellow card) 28'; Al-Khalaf (yellow card) 32'; Guanca 44'; El Sayed (yellow card) 45+1', (goal) 51'; Alemán 63'; Al-Kwikbi 67'; Al-Habib 79'	Report	Souza 45+5'; Al-Mogahwi (yellow card) 55'; Al-Mowalad (yellow card) 59'; Djaniny (yellow card) 62', (goal) 85'	Stadium: Prince Mohamed bin Fahd Stadium; Attendance: 7,901; Referee: Paweł Gil (Poland)

25 October 2018 7	Al-Ahli	5–1	Al-Fateh	Jeddah
18:30	Djaniny 17', 76'; Al Somah 42', 57'; Asiri 83'	Report	Toko 70'	Stadium: King Abdullah Sports City; Attendance: 7,602; Referee: Svein Oddvar Moen (Norway)

3 November 2018 8	Al-Nassr	0–2	Al-Ahli	Riyadh
17:55		Report	Souza (yellow card) 48'; Al-Fatil (yellow card) 59'; Al-Mousa (yellow card) 74'; Al Somah 75'; Al-Mowalad (yellow card) 90'; Djaniny 90+4'	Stadium: Prince Faisal bin Fahd Stadium; Attendance: 20,000; Referee: Ravshan Irmatov (Uzbekistan)

9 November 2018 9	Al-Ahli	0–2	Al-Qadsiah	Jeddah
18:20	Al-Owais (yellow card) 79'	Report	Camara 69', 78'	Stadium: King Abdullah Sports City; Attendance: 21,499; Referee: Damir Skomina (Slovenia)

25 November 2018 10	Al-Ittihad	1–3	Al-Ahli	Jeddah
19:45	Al-Muwallad 7'; Al-Saloli (yellow card) 20'; Al-Muziel (yellow card) 79'; El Ahmadi (yellow card) 89'	Report	Al Somah 21'; Asiri 49', (yellow card) 62'; Díaz (yellow card) 59'; Said 76'	Stadium: King Abdullah Sports City; Attendance: 46,527; Referee: Milorad Mažić (Serbia)

30 November 2018 11	Al-Ahli	1–1	Al-Fayha	Jeddah
18:30	Al Somah 69'	Report	Al-Barakah (yellow card) 21'; Gómez 90+2'	Stadium: King Abdullah Sports City; Attendance: 15,969; Referee: Damir Skomina (Slovenia)

8 December 2018 12	Al-Raed	0–0	Al-Ahli	Buraidah
17:50	Hammoudan (yellow card) 53'; Bangoura (yellow card) 57'; Amora (yellow card) 90+5'	Report	Díaz (red card) 61'	Stadium: King Abdullah Sport City Stadium; Attendance: 1,953; Referee: Svein Oddvar Moen (Norway)

15 December 2018 13	Al-Ahli	0–1	Al-Shabab	Jeddah
18:25	Abdel Shafy (yellow card) 11'; Jurado (yellow card) 18'; Alexis (yellow card) 25'; Al-Mowalad (yellow card) 41'; Souza (yellow card) 86'	Report	Al-Sulayhem (yellow card) 71'; Ghazi (yellow card) 88'; Arthur 90+5'	Stadium: King Abdullah Sports City; Attendance: 20,876; Referee: Szymon Marciniak (Poland)

21 December 2018 14	Al-Hilal	4–3	Al-Ahli	Riyadh
15:10	Al-Bulaihi (yellow card) 40'; Gomis 45+3' (pen.); Al-Shahrani 47'; Eduardo 66' (pen.); Carrillo 77'; Al-Breik (yellow card) 90+3'	Report	Al Somah 7', 81' (pen.), 85', (yellow card) 76'; Souza (yellow card) 31'; Al-Owais (yellow card) 38'; Díaz (yellow card) 65'	Stadium: King Saud University Stadium; Attendance: 21,577; Referee: Clément Turpin (France

28 December 2018 15	Al-Wehda	2–1	Al-Ahli	Mecca
18:30	Otero 5'; Bakshween (yellow card) 90+8'; Marcos Guilherme 90+9'	Report	Al-Mousa (yellow card) 47'; Díaz (yellow card) 62' (yellow-red card) 89'; Jurado (yellow card) 85'; Al Somah 90+4' (pen.); Alexis (yellow card) 90+7'	Stadium: King Abdul Aziz Stadium; Attendance: 5,936; Referee: Ovidiu Hațegan (Romania)

11 January 2019 16	Al-Ahli	5–1	Ohod	Mecca
18:35	Djaniny 7', 15', 33', 65', 80'; Al-Harbi (yellow card) 45+1'; Hindi (yellow card) 85'	Report	Teikeu (yellow card) 27'; Otaif 58'; Medjani (yellow card) 59'	Stadium: King Abdul Aziz Stadium; Attendance: 1,605; Referee: Paolo Mazzoleni (Italy)

28 January 2019 17	Al-Taawoun	3–4	Al-Ahli	Buraidah
20:20	Al-Zubaidi 56'; Al-Hussain 59'; Héldon 85'	Report	Asiri 41'; Djaniny 64' (pen.), 86'; Al Somah 80' (pen.); Al-Fatil (yellow card) 90+1'	Stadium: King Abdullah Sport City Stadium; Attendance: 2,724; Referee: Mark Clattenburg (England)

2 February 2019 18	Al-Batin	1–2	Al-Ahli	Hafar al-Batin
18:15	Jhonnattann 41'; Masrahi (yellow card) 78'	Report	Al-Moasher 30'; Asiri 54'	Stadium: Al-Batin Club Stadium; Attendance: 3,023; Referee: Svein Oddvar Moen (Norway)

7 February 2019 19	Al-Hazem	2–4	Al-Ahli	Buraidah
20:15	Pajoy 14'; Al-Saiari (yellow card) 18', (goal) 34'; Bakhit (yellow card) 31'; Al-Qeshtah (yellow card) 45+2'; Al-Barakah (yellow card) 55'	Report	Asiri 9', (yellow card) 83'; Al-Qeshtah 16' (o.g.); Díaz (yellow card) 35'; Djaniny 50'; Stanciu (yellow card) 83'; Al Somah 90+4'	Stadium: King Abdullah Sport City Stadium; Attendance: 1,589; Referee: Artur Soares Dias (Portugal)

12 February 2019 20	Al-Ahli	1–2	Al-Nassr	Jeddah
20:20	Hindi (yellow card) 23'; Al Somah 59' (pen.)	Report	Hamdallah 45+1', 60'; Uvini (yellow card) 52'; Amrabat (yellow card) 90+2'	Stadium: King Abdullah Sports City; Attendance: 30,335; Referee: Cüneyt Çakır (Turkey)

20 February 2019 21	Al-Fateh	2–1	Al-Ahli	Al-Hasa
18:20	Al-Majhad 7', 90'; Al-Fuhaid (yellow card) 75'; Aguirregaray (yellow card) 87'	Report	Assiri (yellow card) 34', (goal) 73'; Baeza (yellow card) 55'; Abdulghani (yellow card) 90+5'	Stadium: Prince Abdullah bin Jalawi Stadium; Attendance: 4,807; Referee: Matthew Conger (New Zealand)

1 March 2019 22	Al-Ahli	1–1	Al-Ittihad	Jeddah
20:30	Baeza (yellow card) 73'; Al Somah 78'	Report	Al-Muwallad (yellow card) 3'; El Ahmadi (yellow card) 21'; Romarinho 70'	Stadium: King Abdullah Sports City; Attendance: 42,880; Referee: Damir Skomina (Slovenia)

8 March 2019 23	Al-Qadsiah	1–2	Al-Ahli	Khobar
15:40	Belal (yellow card) 27'; Bismark 31'; Belkhiter (yellow card) 76'	Report	Al-Moasher (yellow card) 21'; Santos 37'; Al Somah 90+4'	Stadium: Prince Saud bin Jalawi Stadium; Attendance: 3,022; Referee: Dennis Higler (Netherlands)

28 March 2019 25	Al-Ahli	4–5	Al-Raed	Jeddah
20:40	Assiri 10', 53', (yellow card) 88'; Al-Moasher 20', (yellow card) 31'; Al-Jassim 27', (yellow card) 45+3'; Hindi (yellow card) 45+3'; Asiri (yellow card) 89'; Al-Fatil (yellow card) 90+3'	Report	Al-Amri 5', (yellow card) 29'; Al-Shehri 6', 62', 68' (pen.), 70'; Doukha (yellow card) 80'; Amora (yellow card) 90+3'	Stadium: King Abdullah Sports City; Attendance: 4,146; Referee: Pavel Královec (Czech Republic)

1 April 2019 24	Al-Fayha	0–2	Al-Ahli	Al-Majma'ah
18:55	Gegé (yellow card) 16'; Asprilla (yellow card) 51'; Al-Sobhi (yellow card) 57'; Al-Qahtani (yellow card) 71'; Al-Khaibari (yellow card) 74'	Report	Assiri (yellow card) 20'; Djaniny 39'; Díaz (yellow card) 65'; Al-Mogahwi (yellow card) 82', (goal) 88'	Stadium: King Salman Sport City Stadium; Attendance: 1,221; Referee: Anastasios Sidiropoulos (Greece)

5 April 2019 26	Al-Shabab	0–4	Al-Ahli	Riyadh
20:45	Benlamri (yellow card) 61'; Boussoufa (yellow card) 72'	Report	Al-Fatil (yellow card) 21', (goal) 33'; Djaniny 38', 53'; Díaz (yellow card) 58'; Al-Moasher 63'	Stadium: Prince Faisal bin Fahd Stadium; Attendance: 5,312; Referee: Felix Brych (Germany)

12 April 2019 27	Al-Ahli	0–1	Al-Hilal	Jeddah
20:45	Al-Harbi (yellow card) 27' (yellow-red card) 38'; Abdulghani (yellow card) 76'	Report	Al-Breik (yellow card) 20'; Botía 43'; Al-Dawsari (yellow card) 90'	Stadium: King Abdullah Sports City; Attendance: 33,868; Referee: Szymon Marciniak (Poland)

17 April 2019 28	Al-Ahli	3–2	Al-Wehda	Jeddah
20:45	Al Somah 17', 47'; Abdulghani (yellow card) 38'; Stanciu 45+1'; Al-Mousa (yellow card) 52'; Al-Jassim (yellow card) 90+5'	Report	Anselmo (yellow card) 13' (yellow-red card) 81'; Otero (yellow card) 34', (goal) 71' (pen.); Kasongo 73'	Stadium: King Abdullah Sports City; Attendance: 4,983; Referee: Bakary Gassama (Gambia)

11 May 2019 29	Al-Faisaly	1–4	Al-Ahli	Al-Majma'ah
22:30	Calderón 48'	Report	Stanciu 11'; Asiri 31'; Baeza (yellow card) 47'; Al Fatil (yellow card) 51'; Djaniny 59'; Alhaj 90+1'	Stadium: King Salman Sport City Stadium; Attendance: 503; Referee: Turki Al-Khudhayr

16 May 2019 30	Al-Ahli	5–0	Al-Ettifaq	Jeddah
22:30	Djaniny 38', 50', 84' (pen.); Al Somah 65'; Ghareeb 89'	Report	Al-Habib (yellow card) 42'; Arias (yellow card) 45+1'; Al-Robeai (yellow card) 59'	Stadium: King Abdullah Sports City; Attendance: 4,000; Referee: Viktor Kassai (Hungary)

=== King Cup ===
All times are local, AST (UTC+3).

5 January 2019 Round of 64	Al-Ahli	4–0	Al-Riyadh	Mecca
19:55	Asiri 28'; Al-Mousa 37'; Djaniny 41'; Al-Zaqrati 69'	Report		Stadium: King Abdul Aziz Stadium; Referee: Mohammed Al-Hoaish

18 January 2019 Round of 32	Al-Nojoom	0–1	Al-Ahli	Al-Hasa
17:55		Report	Al-Mowalad (yellow card) 15'; Djaniny 27' (pen.); Díaz (yellow card) 80'; Al-Harbi (yellow card) 88'	Stadium: Prince Abdullah bin Jalawi Stadium; Referee: Sultan Al-Harbi

23 January 2019 Round of 16	Al-Ahli	1–1 (a.e.t.) (1–3 p)	Al-Wehda	Jeddah
20:05	Al-Harbi (yellow card) 18'; Djaniny 40'; Abdulghani (yellow card) 55'	Report	Mebarakou (yellow card) 33'; Amr (yellow card) 61'; Renato Chaves (yellow card) 77'; Otero 85'; Bakshween (yellow card) 109'	Stadium: King Abdullah Sports City; Referee: Milorad Mažić (Serbia)
	Penalties
	Djaniny (penalty scored); Al-Mousa (penalty missed); Abdulghani (penalty missed); Díaz (penalty missed)		Marcos Guilherme (penalty missed); Darwish (penalty scored); Renato Chaves (penalty scored); Otero (penalty scored)

=== Arab Club Champions Cup ===
==== Round of 32 ====
25 August 2018 First leg	Al-Muharraq (Bahrain)	0–2	(Saudi Arabia) Al-Ahli	Riffa, Bahrain
18:50 AST		Report	Al-Mowalad 66'; Al Somah 83'	Stadium: Bahrain National Stadium; Referee: Yaaqoub Al-Hammadi (United Arab Emirates)

24 September 2018 Second leg	Al-Ahli (Saudi Arabia)	3–0 (5–0 agg.)	(Bahrain) Al-Muharraq	Jeddah, Saudi Arabia
21:00 AST	Ghareeb 18', 61'; Al Somah (yellow card) 56', (goal) 89'	Report	Yaser (yellow card) 58'	Stadium: King Abdullah Sports City; Referee: Youssef Essrayri (Tunisia)

==== Round of 16 ====
28 October 2018 First leg	ES Sétif (Algeria)	0–1	(Saudi Arabia) Al-Ahli	Sétif, Algeria
21:00 EET	Bakir (yellow card) 45'; Banouh (yellow card) 77'; Ghacha (red card) 78'	Report	Al-Mowalad (yellow card) 50'; Ghareeb 57'; Souza (red card) 78'	Stadium: Stade 8 Mai 1945; Referee: Noureddine El Jaafari (Morocco)

4 December 2018 Second leg	Al-Ahli (Saudi Arabia)	1–1 (2–1 agg.)	(Algeria) ES Sétif	Jeddah, Saudi Arabia
19:30 AST	Al-Fatil (yellow card) 35'; Al-Mowalad 49'	Report	Banouh 17'; Bedrane (yellow card) 51'	Stadium: King Abdullah Sports City; Attendance: 6,130; Referee: Gehad Grisha (Egypt)

==== Quarter-finals ====
16 February 2019 First leg	Al-Wasl (United Arab Emirates)	2–2	(Saudi Arabia) Al-Ahli	Dubai, United Arab Emirates
17:30 GST	Jassem 1'; Fábio Lima (yellow card) 24'; Esmaeel (yellow card) 72'; Caio 88' (pen.); Dwubeng (yellow card) 89'	Report	Al-Moasher (yellow card) 29'; Stanciu 66'; Djaniny 72'; Al-Mousa (yellow card) 74'	Stadium: Zabeel Stadium; Referee: Mahmoud El Banna (Egypt)

25 February 2019 Second leg	Al-Ahli (Saudi Arabia)	2–1 (4–3 agg.)	(United Arab Emirates) Al-Wasl	Jeddah, Saudi Arabia
20:45 AST	Díaz 52', (yellow card) 85'; Abdel Shafy (yellow card) 66'; Al-Mowalad (yellow card) 78'; Al-Moasher 90+1'	Report	Saleh 38', (yellow card) 85'; Salmeen (yellow card) 44'; Jassem (yellow card) 51'; Ismail (yellow card) 79'	Stadium: King Abdullah Sports City; Attendance: 10,450; Referee: Redouane Jiyed (Morocco)

==== Semi-finals ====
17 March 2019 First leg	Al-Hilal (Saudi Arabia)	1–0	(Saudi Arabia) Al-Ahli	Riyadh, Saudi Arabia
18:45 AST	Botía (yellow card) 45+1'; Soriano 49'	Report	Al-Mousa (yellow card) 61'; Assiri (yellow card) 90+5'	Stadium: King Saud University Stadium; Referee: Ammar Al-Jeneibi (United Arab Emirates)

15 April 2019 Second leg	Al-Ahli (Saudi Arabia)	1–0 (1–1 agg.) (2–3 p)	(Saudi Arabia) Al-Hilal	Jeddah, Saudi Arabia
20:45 AST	Díaz 18'; Al-Mogahwi (yellow card) 24'; Al-Mowalad (yellow card) 68'; Al-Mousa (yellow card) 90+2'	Report	Al-Khaibri (yellow card) 73'; Al-Breik (yellow card) 82'; Al-Bulaihi (yellow card) 86'	Stadium: King Abdullah Sports City; Attendance: 33,257; Referee: Gehad Grisha (Egypt)
	Penalties
	Al Somah (penalty scored); Díaz (penalty missed); Stanciu (penalty scored); Al-Mogahwi (penalty missed); Assiri (penalty missed)		(penalty missed) Carlos Eduardo; (penalty scored) Al-Breik; (penalty missed) Al-Shalhoub; (penalty scored) Gomis; (penalty scored) Al Abed

=== AFC Champions League ===
==== Group stage ====
The group stage draw was made on 22 November 2018 in Kuala Lumpur. Al-Ahli were drawn with Persepolis, Al-Sadd, and Pakhtakor.

Pos	Team	Pld	W	D	L	GF	GA	GD	Pts	Qualification	SAD	AHL	PAK	PER
1	(Qatar) Al-Sadd	6	3	1	2	7	8	−1	10	Advance to knockout stage	—	2–1	2–1	1–0
2	(Saudi Arabia) Al-Ahli	6	3	0	3	7	7	0	9	Advance to knockout stage	2–0	—	2–1	2–1
3	(Uzbekistan) Pakhtakor	6	2	2	2	7	7	0	8		2–2	1–0	—	1–0
4	(Iran) Persepolis	6	2	1	3	6	5	+1	7		2–0	2–0	1–1	—

Source: AFC
Rules for classification: Group stage tiebreakers

5 March 2019 1	Al-Ahli (Saudi Arabia)	2–0	(Qatar) Al-Sadd	Jeddah, Saudi Arabia
20:15 UTC+3	Al Somah 32' (pen.), 76'; Hindi (yellow card) 45'; Al-Harbi (yellow card) 57'; Al-Jassim (yellow card) 90+1'	Live Report; Stats Report	Ró-Ró (yellow card) 61'	Stadium: King Abdullah Sports City; Attendance: 7,328; Referee: Ryuji Sato (Japan)

12 March 2019 2	Pakhtakor (Uzbekistan)	1–0	(Saudi Arabia) Al-Ahli	Tashkent, Uzbekistan
18:00 UTC+5	Azamov (yellow card) 32'; Bikmaev 62'; Krimets (yellow card) 86'	Live Report; Stats Report	Díaz (yellow card) 66'; Al-Owais (yellow card) 84'	Stadium: Pakhtakor Central Stadium; Attendance: 25,250; Referee: Muhammad Taqi (Singapore)

9 April 2019 3	Persepolis (Iran)	2–0	(Saudi Arabia) Al-Ahli	Dubai, United Arab Emirates
19:30 UTC+4	Khalilzadeh 18'; Alipour 48'; Resan (yellow card) 60'; Budimir (yellow card) 76'	Live Report; Stats Report	Djaniny (yellow card) 49'; Abdulghani (yellow card) 76'; Al-Mowalad (yellow card) 90+1'	Stadium: Zabeel Stadium; Attendance: 1,878; Referee: Hiroyuki Kimura (Japan)

22 April 2019 4	Al-Ahli (Saudi Arabia)	2–1	(Iran) Persepolis	Dubai, United Arab Emirates
19:30 UTC+4	Al Somah 30' (pen.), 83'; Djaniny (yellow card) 50'; Hassoun (yellow card) 86'	Live Report; Stats Report	Alipour (yellow card) 49'; Khalilzadeh (yellow card) 58', (goal) 90+3'	Stadium: Al Maktoum Stadium; Attendance: 787; Referee: Ma Ning (China)

6 May 2019 5	Al-Sadd (Qatar)	2–1	(Saudi Arabia) Al-Ahli	Doha, Qatar
21:45 UTC+3	Asad 9'; Afif 12'; Hassan (yellow card) 30'; Gabi (yellow card) 74'; Al Sheeb (yellow card) 82'	Live Report; Stats Report	Al Somah 51' (pen.)	Stadium: Jassim Bin Hamad Stadium; Attendance: 6,683; Referee: Ko Hyung-jin (South Korea)

20 May 2019 6	Al-Ahli (Saudi Arabia)	2–1	(Uzbekistan) Pakhtakor	Jeddah, Saudi Arabia
22:00 UTC+3	Al-Harbi (yellow card) 37'; Al Fatil (yellow card) 55'; Al Somah 69'; Hindi (yellow card) 73'; Hassoun (yellow card) 81'; Ghareeb 90+2'	Live Report; Stats Report	Krimets (yellow card) 50'; Alidzhanov (yellow card) 86'; Sergeev 88'; Sayfiev (yellow card) 89'	Stadium: King Abdullah Sports City; Attendance: 23,183; Referee: Ryuji Sato (Japan)

== Statistics ==
=== Appearances ===
Last updated on 20 May 2019.

No.	Pos	Nat	Player	Total		Pro League		King Cup		Arab Club Champions Cup		Champions League	
No.	Pos	Nat	Player	Apps	Goals	Apps	Goals	Apps	Goals	Apps	Goals	Apps	Goals
Goalkeepers
1	GK	(Saudi Arabia) KSA	Yasser Al Mosailem	8	0	4	0	3	0	1	0	0	0
33	GK	(Saudi Arabia) KSA	Mohammed Al-Owais	39	0	26	0	0	0	7	0	6	0
55	GK	(Saudi Arabia) KSA	Bakr Eisa	0	0	0	0	0	0	0	0	0	0
66	GK	(Saudi Arabia) KSA	Basem Atallah	0	0	0	0	0	0	0	0	0	0
Defenders
2	DF	(Saudi Arabia) KSA	Saeed Al-Mowalad	38	2	25	0	2	0	6	2	5	0
3	DF	(Saudi Arabia) KSA	Mohammed Al-Fatil	30	1	22	1	0	0	5	0	3	0
4	DF	(Spain) ESP	Alexis	12	0	7+1	0	2	0	1+1	0	0	0
13	DF	(Egypt) EGY	Mohamed Abdel Shafy	32	0	22	0	3	0	7	0	0	0
17	DF	(Chile) CHI	Paulo Díaz	41	2	23+1	0	3	0	8	2	6	0
20	DF	(Saudi Arabia) KSA	Ali Al-Zubaidi	0	0	0	0	0	0	0	0	0	0
23	DF	(Saudi Arabia) KSA	Abdullah Hassoun	13	0	5	0	0+1	0	2+1	0	1+3	0
24	DF	(Saudi Arabia) KSA	Hussein Abdulghani	10	0	3	0	1+1	0	0	0	5	0
25	DF	(Saudi Arabia) KSA	Motaz Hawsawi	1	0	1	0	0	0	0	0	0	0
26	DF	(Saudi Arabia) KSA	Fares Al-Khoraimi	1	0	0	0	0+1	0	0	0	0	0
27	DF	(Saudi Arabia) KSA	Mohammed Al-Zubaidi	3	0	2+1	0	0	0	0	0	0	0
30	DF	(Saudi Arabia) KSA	Hani Al-Sebyani	1	0	1	0	0	0	0	0	0	0
32	DF	(Saudi Arabia) KSA	Faisal Darisi	1	0	0+1	0	0	0	0	0	0	0
37	DF	(Saudi Arabia) KSA	Abdulbasit Hindi	24	0	7+4	0	1	0	6+1	0	4+1	0
75	DF	(Brazil) BRA	Aderlan Santos	14	1	8	1	0	0	0	0	6	0
Midfielders
5	MF	(Chile) CHI	Claudio Baeza	12	0	11+1	0	0	0	0	0	0	0
6	MF	(Brazil) BRA	Souza	17	1	14+1	1	1	0	1	0	0	0
7	MF	(Saudi Arabia) KSA	Salman Al-Moasher	38	4	16+6	3	3	0	6+2	1	4+1	0
8	MF	(Saudi Arabia) KSA	Taisir Al-Jassim	11	1	3+5	1	0	0	0	0	0+3	0
11	MF	(Saudi Arabia) KSA	Housain Al-Mogahwi	26	3	12+5	3	0	0	4+3	0	2	0
16	MF	(Saudi Arabia) KSA	Nooh Al-Mousa	35	2	14+5	1	1+1	1	8	0	5+1	0
28	MF	(Saudi Arabia) KSA	Ayman Al-Khulaif	10	0	0+5	0	0+1	0	1+1	0	0+2	0
29	MF	(Saudi Arabia) KSA	Abdulrahman Ghareeb	27	5	6+12	1	0+1	0	3	3	3+2	1
35	MF	(Saudi Arabia) KSA	Yousef Al-Harbi	16	0	6+1	0	2	0	0+4	0	2+1	0
38	MF	(Saudi Arabia) KSA	Fahad Majrashi	1	0	0	0	0+1	0	0	0	0	0
40	MF	(Saudi Arabia) KSA	Yahya Al-Qarni	1	0	0	0	0	0	0+1	0	0	0
45	MF	(Saudi Arabia) KSA	Abdulfattah Asiri	32	7	12+7	6	3	1	5+2	0	3	0
49	MF	(Saudi Arabia) KSA	Firas Al-Ghamdi	3	0	0+1	0	1	0	1	0	0	0
71	MF	(Romania) ROU	Nicolae Stanciu	14	3	8+2	2	0	0	4	1	0	0
77	MF	(Saudi Arabia) KSA	Omar Al-Zayni	3	0	0+1	0	0+1	0	0	0	0+1	0
80	MF	(Saudi Arabia) KSA	Bader Munshi	0	0	0	0	0	0	0	0	0	0
Forwards
9	FW	(Syria) SYR	Omar Al Somah	37	27	19+5	19	1	0	5+1	2	6	6
14	FW	(Saudi Arabia) KSA	Muhannad Assiri	19	4	6+7	4	0	0	0+4	0	1+1	0
18	FW	(Chad) CHA	Othman Alhaj	6	1	2+2	1	1+1	0	0	0	0	0
21	FW	(Cape Verde) CPV	Djaniny	35	24	17+4	20	3	3	5+1	1	4+1	0
99	FW	(Saudi Arabia) KSA	Safi Al-Zaqrati	3	1	0+2	0	0+1	1	0	0	0	0
Players sent out on loan this season
50	MF	(Saudi Arabia) KSA	Abdullah Majrashi	8	0	0+5	0	0	0	1+2	0	0	0
Player who made an appearance this season but have left the club
10	MF	(Spain) ESP	José Manuel Jurado	18	1	15+2	1	1	0	0	0	0	0
19	MF	(Egypt) EGY	Abdallah Said	15	2	13+1	2	0	0	1	0	0	0

=== Goalscorers ===
Rank	No.	Pos	Nat	Name	Pro League	King Cup	Arab Club Champions Cup	Champions League	Total
1	9	FW	(Syria)	Omar Al Somah	19	0	2	6	27
2	21	FW	(Cape Verde)	Djaniny	20	3	1	0	24
3	45	MF	(Saudi Arabia)	Abdulfattah Asiri	6	1	0	0	7
4	29	FW	(Saudi Arabia)	Abdulrahman Ghareeb	1	0	3	1	5
5	7	MF	(Saudi Arabia)	Salman Al-Moasher	3	0	1	0	4
5	14	FW	(Saudi Arabia)	Muhannad Assiri	4	0	0	0	4
7	11	MF	(Saudi Arabia)	Housain Al-Mogahwi	3	0	0	0	3
7	71	MF	(Romania)	Nicolae Stanciu	2	0	1	0	3
9	2	DF	(Saudi Arabia)	Saeed Al-Mowalad	0	0	2	0	2
9	16	MF	(Saudi Arabia)	Nooh Al-Mousa	1	1	0	0	2
9	17	DF	(Chile)	Paulo Díaz	0	0	2	0	2
9	19	MF	(Egypt)	Abdallah Said	2	0	0	0	2
13	3	DF	(Saudi Arabia)	Mohammed Al-Fatil	1	0	0	0	1
13	6	MF	(Brazil)	Souza	1	0	0	0	1
13	8	MF	(Saudi Arabia)	Taisir Al-Jassim	1	0	0	0	1
13	10	MF	(Spain)	José Manuel Jurado	1	0	0	0	1
13	18	FW	(Chad)	Othman Alhaj	1	0	0	0	1
13	75	DF	(Brazil)	Aderlan Santos	1	0	0	0	1
13	99	FW	(Saudi Arabia)	Safi Al-Zaqrati	0	1	0	0	1
Own goal					1	0	0	0	1
Total					68	6	12	7	93

Last Updated: 20 May 2019

=== Assists ===
Rank	No.	Pos	Nat	Name	Pro League	King Cup	Arab Club Champions Cup	Champions League	Total
1	45	MF	(Saudi Arabia)	Abdulfattah Asiri	7	3	2	0	12
2	7	MF	(Saudi Arabia)	Salman Al-Moasher	6	0	2	1	9
2	21	FW	(Cape Verde)	Djaniny	6	1	1	1	9
4	9	FW	(Syria)	Omar Al Somah	6	0	0	0	6
5	13	DF	(Egypt)	Mohamed Abdel Shafy	1	0	3	0	4
6	6	MF	(Brazil)	Souza	3	0	0	0	3
6	10	MF	(Spain)	José Manuel Jurado	3	0	0	0	3
6	11	MF	(Saudi Arabia)	Housain Al-Mogahwi	2	0	1	0	3
6	71	MF	(Romania)	Nicolae Stanciu	3	0	0	0	3
10	16	MF	(Saudi Arabia)	Nooh Al-Mousa	2	0	0	0	2
10	17	DF	(Chile)	Paulo Díaz	2	0	0	0	2
10	19	MF	(Egypt)	Abdallah Said	2	0	0	0	2
13	2	DF	(Saudi Arabia)	Saeed Al-Mowalad	1	0	0	0	1
13	4	DF	(Spain)	Alexis	0	0	1	0	1
13	5	MF	(Chile)	Claudio Baeza	1	0	0	0	1
13	14	FW	(Saudi Arabia)	Muhannad Assiri	0	0	1	0	1
13	18	FW	(Chad)	Othman Alhaj	1	0	0	0	1
13	28	MF	(Saudi Arabia)	Ayman Al-Khulaif	1	0	0	0	1
13	29	MF	(Saudi Arabia)	Abdulrahman Ghareeb	1	0	0	0	1
Total					48	4	11	2	65

Last Updated: 20 May 2019

=== Clean sheets ===
Rank	No.	Pos	Nat	Name	Pro League	King Cup	Arab Club Champions Cup	Champions League	Total
1	33	GK	(Saudi Arabia)	Mohammed Al-Owais	9	0	3	1	13
2	1	GK	(Saudi Arabia)	Yasser Al Mosailem	0	2	1	0	3
Total					9	2	4	1	16

Last Updated: 16 May 2019
