= 2020–21 Al-Ahli Saudi FC season =

Al-Ahli
2020–21 season
- President: Abdulelah Mouminah (until 24 April); Majed Al-Nefaie (from 5 May)
- Manager: Vladan Milojević (until 24 March); Laurențiu Reghecampf (from 31 March)
- Stadium: King Abdullah Sports City
- Pro League: 8th
- King Cup: Round of 16 (knocked out by Al-Ain)
- Champions League: Group Stage
- Top goalscorer: League: Omar Al Somah (12); All: Omar Al Somah (17)
Home colours	Away colours	Third colours
- All statistics correct as of 30 May 2021.

The 2020–21 season was Al-Ahli's 45th consecutive season in the top flight of Saudi football and 84th year in existence as a football club. The club participated in the Pro League, the King Cup and the AFC Champions League.

The season covered the period from 30 September 2020 to 30 June 2021.

== Players ==
=== Squad information ===
As of 1 November 2020

Note: Flags indicate national team as defined under FIFA eligibility rules; some limited exceptions apply. Players may hold more than one non-FIFA nationality.

No.	Pos.	Nation	Player
1	GK	KSA	Yasser Al-Mosailem
3	DF	KSA	Mohammed Al-Fatil
4	DF	KSA	Talal Al-Absi
5	DF	KSA	Mohammed Al-Khabrani
6	DF	BRA	Lucas Lima
7	FW	SEN	M'Baye Niang (on loan from Rennes)
8	MF	BIH	Elvis Sarić
9	FW	SYR	Omar Al Somah
10	MF	KSA	Salman Al-Moasher
11	MF	KSA	Housain Al-Mogahwi
13	DF	KSA	Yazeed Al-Bakr
14	FW	KSA	Muhannad Assiri
16	MF	KSA	Nooh Al-Mousa
17	MF	GER	Marko Marin
18	FW	CHA	Othman Alhaj
19	MF	GHA	Samuel Owusu (on loan from Al-Fayha)
21	MF	MAR	Driss Fettouhi

No.	Pos.	Nation	Player
22	GK	KSA	Abdulrahman Al-Sanbi
23	DF	KSA	Abdullah Hassoun
25	DF	KSA	Motaz Hawsawi
26	MF	KSA	Mohammed Al-Majhad
27	MF	KSA	Sultan Mendash
28	MF	ROU	Alexandru Mitriță (on loan from New York City)
29	FW	KSA	Abdulrahman Ghareeb
31	DF	KSA	Hani Al-Sebyani
32	MF	KSA	Hassan Al-Qeed (on loan from Al-Shabab)
33	GK	KSA	Mohammed Al-Owais
35	MF	KSA	Yousef Al-Harbi
37	DF	KSA	Abdulbasit Hindi
40	MF	KSA	Ali Al-Asmari
44	GK	KSA	Mohammed Al Rubaie
55	MF	SRB	Ljubomir Fejsa
70	DF	KSA	Mohammed Bassas
77	FW	KSA	Hassan Al-Ali

=== Out on loan ===
Note: Flags indicate national team as defined under FIFA eligibility rules; some limited exceptions apply. Players may hold more than one non-FIFA nationality.

No.	Pos.	Nation	Player
4	DF	KSA	Khaled Al-Barakah (at Al-Hazem until 30 June 2021)
32	DF	KSA	Faisal Darisi (at Najran until 30 June 2021)
99	FW	KSA	Safi Al-Zaqrati (at Al-Fayha until 30 June 2021)

No.	Pos.	Nation	Player
—	DF	KSA	Mohammed Al-Zubaidi (at Damac until 30 June 2021)
—	MF	KSA	Yahya Al-Qarni (at Al-Jabalain until 30 June 2021)

== Transfers and loans ==
=== Transfers in ===
Entry date	Position	No.	Player	From club	Fee	Ref.
9 September 2020	DF	18	(Saudi Arabia) Talal Al-Absi	(Saudi Arabia) Al-Taawoun	Free	
9 September 2020	DF	31	(Saudi Arabia) Hani Al-Sebyani	(Saudi Arabia) Al-Fayha	End of loan	
30 September 2020	DF	4	(Saudi Arabia) Khaled Al-Barakah	(Saudi Arabia) Al-Ettifaq	End of loan	
30 September 2020	DF	20	(Saudi Arabia) Ali Al-Zubaidi	(Saudi Arabia) Al-Wehda	End of loan	
30 September 2020	DF	–	(Saudi Arabia) Mohammed Al-Zubaidi	(Saudi Arabia) Al-Hazem	End of loan	
30 September 2020	DF	–	(Saudi Arabia) Faisal Darisi	(Saudi Arabia) Al-Raed	End of loan	
30 September 2020	MF	27	(Saudi Arabia) Sultan Mendash	(Saudi Arabia) Al-Taawoun	End of loan	
30 September 2020	MF	40	(Saudi Arabia) Yahya Al-Qarni	(Saudi Arabia) Ohod	End of loan	
30 September 2020	MF	55	(Serbia) Ljubomir Fejsa	(Portugal) Benfica	Free	
30 September 2020	MF	77	(Saudi Arabia) Omar Al-Zayni	(Saudi Arabia) Al-Qadsiah	End of loan	
30 September 2020	MF	–	(Saudi Arabia) Nasser Al-Daajani	(Saudi Arabia) Al-Taawoun	End of loan	
30 September 2020	MF	–	(Saudi Arabia) Abdulaziz Al-Shahrani	(Saudi Arabia) Damac	End of loan	
30 September 2020	FW	18	(Chad) Othman Alhaj	(Saudi Arabia) Al-Fayha	End of loan	
6 October 2020	MF	21	(Morocco) Driss Fettouhi	(Saudi Arabia) Al-Hazem	$700,000	

=== Loans in ===
Start date	End date	Position	No.	Player	From club	Fee	Ref.
9 September 2020	End of season	MF	32	(Saudi Arabia) Hassan Al-Qeed	(Saudi Arabia) Al-Shabab	None	
8 October 2020	31 January 2022	MF	28	(Romania) Alexandru Mitriță	(United States) New York City	None	
25 October 2020	25 January 2021	MF	19	(Ghana) Samuel Owusu	(Saudi Arabia) Al-Fayha	None	
7 February 2021	End of season	FW	–	(Senegal) M'Baye Niang	(France) Stade Rennais	None	

=== Transfers out ===
Exit date	Position	No.	Player	To club	Fee	Ref.
9 September 2020	MF	10	(Saudi Arabia) Abdulfattah Asiri	(Saudi Arabia) Al-Nassr	$1,333,000	
15 September 2020	MF	6	(Brazil) Souza	(Turkey) Beşiktaş	Free	
30 September 2020	GK	66	(Saudi Arabia) Basem Atallah	(Saudi Arabia) Al-Wehda	Free	
30 September 2020	FW	34	(Saudi Arabia) Mazen Abo Shararah	(Saudi Arabia) Damac	End of loan	
4 October 2020	FW	21	(Cape Verde) Djaniny	(Turkey) Trabzonspor	Free	
15 October 2020	DF	24	(Saudi Arabia) Hussein Abdulghani		Retired	
16 October 2020	MF	–	(Saudi Arabia) Ali Awagi	(Saudi Arabia) Al-Tai	Free	
17 October 2020	DF	–	(Saudi Arabia) Ammar Bukhari	(Saudi Arabia) Al-Jabalain	Free	
23 October 2020	MF	–	(Saudi Arabia) Abdulaziz Al-Shahrani	(Saudi Arabia) Damac	Undisclosed	
26 October 2020	MF	77	(Saudi Arabia) Omar Al-Zayni	(Saudi Arabia) Al-Qadsiah	Free	
26 October 2020	MF	–	(Saudi Arabia) Nasser Al-Daajani	(Saudi Arabia) Al-Adalah	Free	
31 October 2020	MF	80	(Saudi Arabia) Bader Munshi	(Saudi Arabia) Al-Kawkab	Free	
1 November 2020	MF	–	(Saudi Arabia) Bader Al-Johani	(Saudi Arabia) Al-Kawkab	Free	
29 January 2021	MF	49	(Saudi Arabia) Firas Al-Ghamdi	(Spain) Gimnàstic	Free	

=== Loans out ===
Start date	End date	Position	No.	Player	To club	Fee	Ref.
30 September 2020	End of season	MF	40	(Saudi Arabia) Yahya Al-Qarni	(Saudi Arabia) Al-Jabalain	None	
9 October 2020	End of season	DF	4	(Saudi Arabia) Khaled Al-Barakah	(Saudi Arabia) Al-Hazem	None	
16 October 2020	End of season	DF	–	(Saudi Arabia) Mohammed Al-Zubaidi	(Saudi Arabia) Damac	None	
18 October 2020	End of season	DF	–	(Saudi Arabia) Faisal Darisi	(Saudi Arabia) Najran	None	
20 October 2020	End of season	FW	99	(Saudi Arabia) Safi Al-Zaqrati	(Saudi Arabia) Al-Fayha	None	
7 February 2021	End of season	MF	17	(Germany) Marko Marin	(Saudi Arabia) Al-Raed	None	

== Competitions ==
=== Overview ===
Competition	Record							
Competition	G	W	D	L	GF	GA	GD	Win %
Pro League	30	11	6	13	44	56	−12	36.67
King Cup	2	0	0	2	1	4	−3	0.00
Champions League	6	2	3	1	9	8	+1	33.33
Total	38	13	9	16	54	68	−14	34.21

Updated to match played 30 May 2021
Source: Competitions

=== Pro League ===
==== League table ====
Pos	Team	Pld	W	D	L	GF	GA	GD	Pts	Qualification or relegation
6	Al-Nassr	30	13	7	10	53	40	+13	46	
7	Al-Fateh	30	12	6	12	55	55	0	42	
8	Al-Ahli	30	11	6	13	44	56	−12	39	
9	Al-Faisaly	30	9	9	12	42	47	−5	36 (Note: Positions determined by head-to-head points: Al-Faisaly: 16 pts; Al-Raed: 15 pts; Damac: 13 pts; Al-Batin: 12 pts; Abha: 3 pts.)	Qualification for the Champions League group stage (Note: Al-Faisaly qualified for the Champions League group stage as 2020–21 King Cup winners.)
10	Al-Raed	30	10	6	14	44	47	−3	36	

Source: spl.com source=إحصائيات رابطة دوري المحترفين السعودي 2020-2021
Rules for classification: 1) Points; 2) Head-to-head points; 3) Head-to-head goal difference; 4) Total goal difference; 5) Total goals scored; 6) Fair-play points (Note: Head-to-head record is used only after all the matches between the teams in question have been played).

==== Results summary ====
Overall								Home						Away					
Pld	W	D	L	GF	GA	GD	Pts	W	D	L	GF	GA	GD	W	D	L	GF	GA	GD
24	10	5	9	36	41	−5	35	4	5	3	15	15	0	6	0	6	21	26	−5

Last updated: 20 March 2021.
Source: spl.com.sa

==== Results by round ====
Round	1	2	3	4	5	6	7	8	9	10	11	12	13	14	15	16	17	18	19	20	21	22	23	24	25	26	27	28	29	30
Ground	A	H	A	A	H	H	A	A	H	A	H	A	H	H	A	H	A	H	H	A	A	H	H	A	H	A	H	A	A	H
Result	W	W	L	W	D	W	L	W	W	W	L	L	D	W	W	D	W	D	D	L	L	L	L	L	L	L	W	L	D	L
Position	6	2	7	3	5	3	3	2	2	2	2	3	3	3	3	3	2	2	3	3	4	4	5	7	7	9	8	8	8	8

Updated to match(es) played on 30 May 2021. Source: spl.com.sa
A = Away; H = Home; W = Win; D = Draw; L = Loss

==== Matches ====
All times are local, AST (UTC+3).

Win Draw Loss Postponed

18 October 2020 1	Al-Batin	0–1	Al-Ahli	Hafar al-Batin
18:00	Al Khairi (yellow card) 44'; Al-Shammeri (yellow card) 90+5'	Report	Al-Moasher 18'; Mendash (yellow card) 24'; Hassoun (yellow card) 36'; Fettouhi (yellow card) 45+3'	Stadium: Al-Batin Club Stadium; Attendance: 0 Referee: Sultan Al-Harbi

22 October 2020 2	Al-Ahli	1–0	Al-Wehda	Jeddah
19:55	Mitriță 73'	Report	Al-Qarni (yellow card) 43'; Bakshween (yellow card) 85'	Stadium: King Abdullah Sports City; Attendance: 0 Referee: Turki Al-Khudhayr

31 October 2020 3	Al-Ittihad	2–0	Al-Ahli	Jeddah
19:50	Romarinho 8'; Rodrigues 16'	Report	Lima (yellow card) 64'	Stadium: King Abdullah Sports City; Attendance: 0 Referee: Majed Al-Shamrani

7 November 2020 4	Al-Ain	3–4	Al-Ahli	Al Bahah
15:35	Taïder 25' (pen.); Al-Harbi 44'; Moutari 45+1'	Report	Al Somah 19' (pen.), 20', 38'; Hassoun (yellow card) 45+1'; Owusu (yellow card) 50', (goal) 65'	Stadium: King Saud Sport City Stadium; Attendance: 0 Referee: Abdullah Al-Shehri

23 November 2020 5	Al-Ahli	2–2	Al-Shabab	Jeddah
18:15	Hassoun 2'; Marin 50'	Report	Guanca 44'; Al-Sqoor 48'	Stadium: King Abdullah Sports City; Attendance: 0 Referee: Mohammed Al-Hoaish

29 November 2020 6	Al-Ahli	2–1	Al-Faisaly	Jeddah
19:40	Al Somah (yellow card) 18', (goal) 28'; Hindi (yellow card) 64'; Mitriță 69'; Fejsa (yellow card) 72'	Report	Daghriri (yellow card) 14'; Amalfitano (yellow card) 86'; Tavares 90+5' (pen.)	Stadium: King Abdullah Sports City; Attendance: 0 Referee: Shukri Al-Hanfoush

5 December 2020 7	Damac	4–3	Al-Ahli	Abha
15:30	Majrashi (yellow card) 4'; Zelaya 25' (pen.), 75'; Al-Zubaidi (yellow card) 61'; Saidani (yellow card) 71'; Chafaï 76'; Abo Shararah 90+2'	Report	Owusu 12', 18'; Fejsa 35'; Fettouhi (yellow card) 39'; Al Somah (yellow card) 56'	Stadium: Prince Sultan bin Abdul Aziz Stadium; Attendance: 0 Referee: Abdullah Al-Harbi

12 December 2020 8	Al-Nassr	1–2	Al-Ahli	Riyadh
19:45	Yahya 39'	Report	Fettouhi 38', 89' (pen.); Hassoun (yellow card) 45+3'; Al-Moasher (yellow card) 58'; Hawsawi (yellow card) 72'; Al-Asmari (yellow card) 90+6'	Stadium: King Fahd International Stadium; Attendance: 0 Referee: Turki Al-Khudhayr

22 December 2020 9	Al-Ahli	1–0	Al-Fateh	Jeddah
19:50	Al Somah 53'; Hawsawi (yellow card) 90+3'	Report	Al-Daheem (yellow card) 42'; Koval (yellow card) 78'	Stadium: King Abdullah Sports City Reserve Stadium; Attendance: 0 Referee: Khaled Salwi

27 December 2020 10	Al-Raed	1–2	Al-Ahli	Buraidah
17:55	Nikolić 13' (pen.)	Report	Al Fatil (yellow card) 15'; Fettouhi (yellow card) 48'; Mitriță 55'; Al Somah 90+2'; Lima (yellow card) 90+6'	Stadium: King Abdullah Sport City Stadium; Attendance: 0 Referee: Sultan Al-Harbi

2 January 2021 11	Al-Ahli	0–3	Al-Taawoun	Mecca
18:30		Report	Amissi (yellow card) 11'; Sané 30'; Al-Jouei 35'; Tawamba 45'; Kadesh (yellow card) 66'; Al-Nabit (yellow card) 69'	Stadium: King Abdul Aziz Stadium; Attendance: 0 Referee: Mohammed Al-Hoaish

8 January 2021 12	Al-Qadsiah	3–1	Al-Ahli	Khobar
17:40	Asprilla 12', (yellow card) 42'; Hazazi (yellow card) 45+3'; Al-Yami 45+3'; Al-Shoeil (yellow card) 51' (yellow-red card) 84'; Edson (yellow card) 72'; Al-Amri 76'	Report	Hassoun (yellow card) 20'; Ghareeb 88'	Stadium: Prince Saud bin Jalawi Stadium; Attendance: 0 Referee: Abdullah Al-Harbi

15 January 2021 13	Al-Ahli	0–0	Al-Hilal	Jeddah
20:10	Fejsa (yellow card) 5'; Al-Asmari (yellow card) 45+2'	Report	Carrillo (yellow card) 40'; Vietto (yellow card) 68'	Stadium: King Abdullah Sports City; Attendance: 0 Referee: Majed Al-Shamrani

19 January 2021 14	Al-Ahli	3–0	Abha	Jeddah
20:10	Al Somah 11', 14'; Al-Asmari (yellow card) 78'; Ghareeb 90+8'	Report	Tahrat (yellow card) 66'; Aouadhi (yellow card) 87'	Stadium: King Abdullah Sports City Reserve Stadium; Attendance: 0 Referee: Mohammed Al-Nuhait

24 January 2021 15	Al-Ettifaq	1–2	Al-Ahli	Dammam
20:10	Souza (yellow card) 45+2'; Sliti 90+3' (pen.)	Report	Al Fatil 58'; Al-Owais (yellow card) 90+2'; Mendash 90+4'	Stadium: Prince Mohamed bin Fahd Stadium; Attendance: 0 Referee: Sultan Al-Harbi

31 January 2021 16	Al-Ahli	2–2	Al-Batin	Jeddah
20:10	Hawsawi 11'; Al-Moasher 28' (pen.); Al-Qeed (yellow card) 90+1'; Hassoun (yellow card) 90+4'	Report	Al Abbas 16', 43'; Sami (yellow card) 70'; El Jebli (yellow card) 90+3'	Stadium: King Abdullah Sports City Reserve Stadium; Attendance: 0 Referee: King Abdullah Sports City

5 February 2021 17	Al-Wehda	2–4	Al-Ahli	Mecca
20:15	Al-Eisa 17'; Niakaté 24'; Luisinho (yellow card) 90+5'	Report	Al-Mogahwi 7'; Al-Moasher 13'; Mitriță 90+1'; Al Somah 90+3'	Stadium: King Abdul Aziz Stadium; Attendance: 0 Referee: Khaled Al-Teris

11 February 2021 18	Al-Ahli	1–1	Al-Ittihad	Jeddah
20:20	Ghareeb 24'; Hawsawi (yellow card) 34'; Al-Asmari (yellow card) 45+1'; Fejsa (yellow card) 56'; Lima (yellow card) 90+4'	Report	Hegazi 86'	Stadium: King Abdullah Sports City Reserve Stadium; Attendance: 0 Referee: Mohammed Al-Hoaish

17 February 2021 19	Al-Ahli	1–1	Al-Ain	Jeddah
20:20	Ghareeb 84'	Report	Bradarić 39'; Fouad (yellow card) 62'; Al-Shoraimi (yellow card) 75'; Kabi (yellow card) 77'	Stadium: King Abdullah Sports City Reserve Stadium; Attendance: 0 Referee: Mohammed Al-Esmaiel

22 February 2021 20	Al-Shabab	3–0	Al-Ahli	Riyadh
20:35	Sharahili 12'; Salem (yellow card) 45+2'; N'Diaye 70'; Banega (yellow card) 88'; Guanca 90+5'	Report	Lima (yellow card) 69'; Hawsawi (yellow card) 69'	Stadium: Prince Khalid bin Sultan Stadium; Attendance: 0 Referee: Majed Al-Shamrani

27 February 2021 21	Al-Faisaly	2–1	Al-Ahli	Al Majma'ah
20:30	Tavares (yellow card) 67', (goal) 83' (pen.); M. Qassem (yellow card) 70'; Al-Saiari 90+2'	Report	Ghareeb (yellow card) 41'; Mendash 49'; Al-Moasher (yellow card) 88'; Hassoun (yellow card) 90+2'; Hindi (yellow card) 90+7'	Stadium: Al Majma'ah Sports City; Attendance: 0 Referee: Ahmad Al-Rumaikhani

6 March 2021 22	Al-Ahli	1–3	Damac	Mecca
20:35	Ghareeb 13'; Al-Khabrani (yellow card) 90+5'	Report	Al-Ammar (yellow card) 13'; Hamzi 55', (yellow card) 86'; Zelaya 60' (pen.), 67', (yellow card) 76'; Al Haydar (yellow card) 81'	Stadium: King Abdul Aziz Stadium; Attendance: 0 Referee: Faisal Al-Blwi

11 March 2021 23	Al-Ahli	1–2	Al-Nassr	Jeddah
20:45	Al Somah 58'; Fettouhi (yellow card) 67'	Report	Martínez (yellow card) 32'; Al-Amri 41'; Petros (yellow card) 43'; Hamdallah 85'; Al-Ghamdi (yellow card) 89'	Stadium: King Abdullah Sports City Reserve Stadium; Attendance: 0 Referee: Khaled Al-Teris

20 March 2021 24	Al-Fateh	4–1	Al-Ahli	Al-Hasa
18:30	Al-Fuhaid (yellow card) 8' (yellow-red card) 58'; Majrashi 12', 69'; Cueva 36' (pen.), 71'	Report	Al-Absi (yellow card) 35', (goal) 84'; Lima (yellow card) 90'	Stadium: Prince Abdullah bin Jalawi Stadium; Attendance: 0 Referee: Turki Al-Khudhayr

8 April 2021 25	Al-Ahli	2–3	Al-Raed	Mecca
20:50	Ghareeb (yellow card) 22'; Hassoun (yellow card) 58'; Assiri 72'; Al Somah 90+1' (pen.)		Djoum (yellow card) 4', (goal) 28'; Doukha (yellow card) 10'; El Berkaoui 16' (pen.), 24' (pen.); Al-Khathlan (yellow card) 81'; Al-Fahad (yellow card) 90'; Al-Dossari (yellow card) 90+6'	Stadium: King Abdul Aziz Stadium; Attendance: 0 Referee: Shukri Al-Hanfoush

7 May 2021 26	Al-Taawoun	4–2	Al-Ahli	Buraidah
21:50	Tawamba 21'; Assiri (yellow card) 27', (goal) 90+1'; Al-Ghamdi (yellow card) 40' (yellow-red card) 69'; Kaku 54' (pen.); Al-Nemer 90+5'	Report	Al-Mogahwi (yellow card) 30'; Al-Moasher 42', 71' (pen.); Hawsawi (yellow card) 72'	Stadium: King Abdullah Sport City Stadium; Attendance: 0 Referee: Sultan Al-Harbi

14 May 2021 27	Al-Ahli	1–0	Al-Qadsiah	Jeddah
21:00	Hassoun (yellow card) 55' (yellow-red card) 79'; Fettouhi (yellow card) 57'; Al Somah 68' (pen.); Al-Mousa (yellow card) 72'; Al-Moasher (yellow card) 89'; Mitriță (yellow card) 90+4'	Report	Williams (yellow card) 10'; Al-Amri (yellow card) 85'	Stadium: King Abdullah Sports City Reserve Stadium; Attendance: 0 Referee: Turki Al-Khudhayr

19 May 2021 28	Al-Hilal	5–1	Al-Ahli	Riyadh
21:00	S. Al-Dawsari 15'; Gomis 32', 42' (pen.); Jahfali (yellow card) 44'; Al-Shehri 65' (pen.), 90+2'; Carrillo (yellow card) 81'	Report	Hawsawi (red card) 39'; Al-Owais (yellow card) 64'; Ghareeb 66'; Al-Ali (yellow card) 83'	Stadium: Prince Faisal bin Fahd Stadium; Referee: Szymon Marciniak (Poland)

25 May 2021 29	Abha	1–1	Al-Ahli	Abha
21:00	Zidan (yellow card) 41'; Afaneh 83'	Report	Al-Asmari (yellow card) 32'; Al-Mogahwi 39'; Al-Mousa (yellow card) 80'	Stadium: Prince Sultan bin Abdul Aziz Stadium; Attendance: 468; Referee: Majed Al-Shamrani

30 May 2021 30	Al-Ahli	1–2	Al-Ettifaq	Jeddah
21:00	Al-Majhad 8'; Hassoun (yellow card) 42'	Report	Al-Kwikbi 5'; Hazazi (yellow card) 26', (goal) 65'	Stadium: King Abdullah Sports City Reserve Stadium; Attendance: 196; Referee: Sultan Sughayyir

=== King Cup ===
==== 2019–20 King Cup ====
All times are local, AST (UTC+3).

27 October 2020 Semi-finals	Al-Ahli	1–2	Al-Nassr	Jeddah
20:30	Al Somah 19'; Fejsa (yellow card) 33'; Fettouhi (yellow card) 41'; Hassoun (yellow card) 46'; Al-Moasher (yellow card) 60'; Hawsawi (yellow card) 82'	Report	Martínez (yellow card) 42', (goal) 85'; Petros 45+3'; Al-Khalaf (yellow card) 80'	Stadium: King Abdullah Sports City; Attendance: 0 Referee: Andrés Rojas (Colombia)

==== 2020–21 King Cup ====
All times are local, AST (UTC+3).

17 December 2020 Round of 16	Al-Ahli	0–2	Al-Ain	Jeddah
20:20	Lima (yellow card) 32'; Fejsa (yellow card) 45+3'	Report	Getterson (yellow card) 42', (goal) 64'; Bradarić 71' (pen.)	Stadium: King Abdullah Sports City Reserve Stadium; Attendance: 0 Referee: Mohammed Al-Qarni

=== AFC Champions League ===
==== Group stage ====
Pos	Team	Pld	W	D	L	GF	GA	GD	Pts	Qualification	EST	DUH	AHL	SHO
1	(Iran) Esteghlal	6	3	2	1	14	8	+6	11	Advance to Round of 16	—	2–2	5–2	1–0
2	(Qatar) Al-Duhail	6	2	3	1	11	9	+2	9		4–3	—	1–1	2–0
3	(Saudi Arabia) Al-Ahli (H)	6	2	3	1	9	8	+1	9		0–0	1–1	—	2–1
4	(Iraq) Al-Shorta	6	1	0	5	3	12	−9	3		0–3	2–1	0–3	—

Source: AFC
Rules for classification: Tiebreakers
(H) Hosts

15 April 2021 1	Esteghlal (Iran)	5–2	(Saudi Arabia) Al-Ahli	Jeddah, Saudi Arabia
23:15 UTC+3	Esmaeili 5'; Naderi 54'; Ghayedi 67', 86'; Diabaté 89'	Report	Al Somah 27', 79', (yellow card) 37'; Al-Moasher (yellow card) 68'	Stadium: Sports Hall; Attendance: 0 Referee: Ahmed Al-Ali (Jordan)

18 April 2021 2	Al-Ahli (Saudi Arabia)	1–1	(Qatar) Al-Duhail	Jeddah, Saudi Arabia
20:45 UTC+3	Al Somah 90+1'	Report	Olunga 53'	Stadium: Sports Hall; Attendance: 0 Referee: Sivakorn Pu-udom (Thailand)

21 April 2021 3	Al-Shorta (Iraq)	0–3	(Saudi Arabia) Al-Ahli	Jeddah, Saudi Arabia
23:15 UTC+3	Attwan (yellow card) 52'	Report	Hassoun 22'; Fettouhi 37'; Ghareeb 90+4'	Stadium: Sports Hall; Attendance: 0 Referee: Muhammad Taqi (Singapore)

24 April 2021 4	Al-Ahli (Saudi Arabia)	2–1	(Iraq) Al-Shorta	Jeddah, Saudi Arabia
20:45 UTC+3	Al Somah 5'; Ghareeb (yellow card) 65', (goal) 79'; Hindi (yellow card) 90+4'	Report	Youssef 26'	Stadium: Sports Hall; Attendance: 0 Referee: Sivakorn Pu-udom (Thailand)

27 April 2021 5	Al-Ahli (Saudi Arabia)	0–0	(Iran) Esteghlal	Jeddah, Saudi Arabia
23:15 UTC+3		Report		Stadium: Sports Hall; Attendance: 0 Referee: Ryuji Sato (Japan)

30 April 2021 6	Al-Duhail (Qatar)	1–1	(Saudi Arabia) Al-Ahli	Jeddah, Saudi Arabia
23:15 UTC+3	Boudiaf (yellow card) 14'; Olunga 61', (yellow card) 87'	Report	Hawsawi (yellow card) 64'; Hassoun (yellow card) 69'; Asiri 73'; Al-Mogahwi (yellow card) 75'; Al-Mousa (yellow card) 77'; Al-Fatil (yellow card) 87'	Stadium: Sports Hall; Attendance: 0 Referee: Hettikamkanamge Perera (Sri Lanka)

== Statistics ==
=== Appearances ===
Last updated on 30 May 2021.

No.	Pos	Nat	Player	Total		Pro League		King Cup		Champions League	
No.	Pos	Nat	Player	Apps	Goals	Apps	Goals	Apps	Goals	Apps	Goals
Goalkeepers
1	GK	(Saudi Arabia) KSA	Yasser Al-Mosailem	4	0	3+1	0	0	0	0	0
33	GK	(Saudi Arabia) KSA	Mohammed Al-Owais	27	0	20	0	1	0	6	0
44	GK	(Saudi Arabia) KSA	Mohammed Al-Rubaie	8	0	7	0	1	0	0	0
Defenders
3	DF	(Saudi Arabia) KSA	Mohammed Al-Fatil	27	1	20+1	1	0	0	6	0
4	DF	(Saudi Arabia) KSA	Talal Al-Absi	3	1	2+1	1	0	0	0	0
5	DF	(Saudi Arabia) KSA	Mohammed Al-Khabrani	22	0	13+4	0	2	0	0+3	0
6	DF	(Brazil) BRA	Lucas Lima	29	0	26+1	0	2	0	0	0
13	DF	(Saudi Arabia) KSA	Yazeed Al-Bakr	8	0	6+2	0	0	0	0	0
23	DF	(Saudi Arabia) KSA	Abdullah Hassoun	32	2	23+1	1	2	0	6	1
25	DF	(Saudi Arabia) KSA	Motaz Hawsawi	30	1	21+2	1	1	0	6	0
31	DF	(Saudi Arabia) KSA	Hani Al-Sebyani	4	0	1+2	0	0	0	0+1	0
37	DF	(Saudi Arabia) KSA	Abdulbasit Hindi	19	0	8+4	0	1	0	6	0
41	DF	(Saudi Arabia) KSA	Manaf Abo Yabes	0	0	0	0	0	0	0	0
70	DF	(Saudi Arabia) KSA	Mohammed Bassas	1	0	0	0	0	0	0+1	0
Midfielders
8	MF	(Bosnia and Herzegovina) BIH	Elvis Sarić	6	0	0	0	0	0	5+1	0
10	MF	(Saudi Arabia) KSA	Salman Al-Moasher	37	5	19+10	5	1+1	0	4+2	0
11	MF	(Saudi Arabia) KSA	Housain Al-Mogahwi	25	2	12+6	2	0+1	0	1+5	0
16	MF	(Saudi Arabia) KSA	Nooh Al-Mousa	34	0	18+9	0	0+1	0	6	0
21	MF	(Morocco) MAR	Driss Fettouhi	28	3	18+2	2	2	0	6	1
26	MF	(Saudi Arabia) KSA	Mohammed Al-Majhad	6	1	3+2	1	0	0	0+1	0
27	MF	(Saudi Arabia) KSA	Sultan Mendash	24	2	6+12	2	0	0	2+4	0
28	MF	(Romania) ROU	Alexandru Mitriță	30	4	18+7	4	2	0	2+1	0
29	MF	(Saudi Arabia) KSA	Abdulrahman Ghareeb	33	8	14+12	6	0+1	0	5+1	2
30	MF	(Saudi Arabia) KSA	Ziyad Al-Johani	1	0	0+1	0	0	0	0	0
32	MF	(Saudi Arabia) KSA	Hassan Al-Qeed	6	0	1+4	0	0+1	0	0	0
35	MF	(Saudi Arabia) KSA	Yousef Al-Harbi	1	0	0+1	0	0	0	0	0
40	MF	(Saudi Arabia) KSA	Ali Al-Asmari	29	0	14+11	0	0	0	0+4	0
45	MF	(Saudi Arabia) KSA	Haitham Asiri	7	1	0+5	0	0	0	0+2	1
55	MF	(Serbia) SRB	Ljubomir Fejsa	24	1	18+4	1	2	0	0	0
Forwards
7	FW	(Senegal) SEN	M'Baye Niang	5	0	1+4	0	0	0	0	0
9	FW	(Syria) SYR	Omar Al Somah	30	17	23+1	12	1	1	5	4
14	FW	(Saudi Arabia) KSA	Muhannad Assiri	6	1	0+4	1	0+1	0	0+1	0
18	FW	(Chad) CHA	Othman Alhaj	2	0	0+1	0	1	0	0	0
77	FW	(Saudi Arabia) KSA	Hassan Al-Ali	3	0	0+3	0	0	0	0	0
Player who made an appearance this season but have left the club
17	MF	(Germany) GER	Marko Marin	11	1	7+2	1	2	0	0	0
19	MF	(Ghana) GHA	Samuel Owusu	12	3	8+2	3	1+1	0	0	0

=== Goalscorers ===
Rank	No.	Pos	Nat	Name	Pro League	King Cup	Champions League	Total
1	9	FW	(Syria)	Omar Al Somah	12	1	4	17
2	29	MF	(Saudi Arabia)	Abdulrahman Ghareeb	6	0	2	8
3	10	MF	(Saudi Arabia)	Salman Al-Moasher	5	0	0	5
4	28	MF	(Romania)	Alexandru Mitriță	4	0	0	4
5	19	MF	(Ghana)	Samuel Owusu	3	0	0	3
5	21	MF	(Morocco)	Driss Fettouhi	2	0	1	3
7	11	MF	(Saudi Arabia)	Housain Al-Mogahwi	2	0	0	2
7	23	DF	(Saudi Arabia)	Abdullah Hassoun	1	0	1	2
7	27	MF	(Saudi Arabia)	Sultan Mendash	2	0	0	2
10	3	DF	(Saudi Arabia)	Mohammed Al-Fatil	1	0	0	1
10	4	DF	(Saudi Arabia)	Talal Al-Absi	1	0	0	1
10	14	FW	(Saudi Arabia)	Muhannad Assiri	1	0	0	1
10	17	MF	(Germany)	Marko Marin	1	0	0	1
10	25	DF	(Saudi Arabia)	Motaz Hawsawi	1	0	0	1
10	26	MF	(Saudi Arabia)	Mohammed Al-Majhad	1	0	0	1
10	45	MF	(Saudi Arabia)	Haitham Asiri	0	0	1	1
10	55	MF	(Serbia)	Ljubomir Fejsa	1	0	0	1
Own goal					0	0	0	0
Total					44	1	9	54

Last Updated: 30 May 2021

=== Assists ===
Rank	No.	Pos	Nat	Name	Pro League	King Cup	Champions League	Total
1	9	FW	(Syria)	Omar Al Somah	3	0	2	5
1	28	MF	(Romania)	Alexandru Mitriță	5	0	0	5
3	29	MF	(Saudi Arabia)	Abdulrahman Ghareeb	4	0	0	4
4	6	DF	(Brazil)	Lucas Lima	3	0	0	3
4	23	DF	(Saudi Arabia)	Abdullah Hassoun	2	1	0	3
6	11	MF	(Saudi Arabia)	Housain Al-Mogahwi	1	0	1	2
6	16	MF	(Saudi Arabia)	Nooh Al-Mousa	2	0	0	2
6	19	MF	(Ghana)	Samuel Owusu	2	0	0	2
6	21	MF	(Morocco)	Driss Fettouhi	0	0	2	2
10	5	DF	(Saudi Arabia)	Mohammed Al-Khabrani	1	0	0	1
10	10	MF	(Saudi Arabia)	Salman Al-Moasher	1	0	0	1
10	17	MF	(Germany)	Marko Marin	1	0	0	1
10	25	DF	(Saudi Arabia)	Motaz Hawsawi	0	0	1	1
10	27	MF	(Saudi Arabia)	Sultan Mendash	1	0	0	1
10	40	MF	(Saudi Arabia)	Ali Al-Asmari	1	0	0	1
10	55	MF	(Serbia)	Ljubomir Fejsa	1	0	0	1
Total					27	1	6	34

Last Updated: 25 May 2021

=== Clean sheets ===
Rank	No.	Pos	Nat	Name	Pro League	King Cup	Champions League	Total
1	44	GK	(Saudi Arabia)	Mohammed Al-Rubaie	4	0	0	4
2	33	GK	(Saudi Arabia)	Mohammed Al-Owais	1	0	2	3
3	1	GK	(Saudi Arabia)	Yasser Al-Mosailem	2	0	0	2
Total					6	0	2	8

Last Updated: 14 May 2021
