= 2021–22 Al-Ahli Saudi FC season =

Al-Ahli
2021–22 season
- President: Majed Al-Nefaie
- Manager: Besnik Hasi (until 4 March); Robert Siboldi (from 5 March)
- Stadium: King Abdullah Sports City
- Pro League: 15th (relegated)
- King Cup: Quarter-finals (knocked out by Al-Shabab)
- Top goalscorer: League: Omar Al Somah (10 goals); All: Omar Al Somah (11 goals)
- Highest home attendance: 36,079 (vs. Al-Raed, 23 June 2022)
- Lowest home attendance: 7,031 (vs. Al-Fayha, 17 February 2022)
- Average home league attendance: 15,135
Home colours	Away colours	Third colours
- All statistics correct as of 27 June 2022.

The 2021–22 season was Al-Ahli's 46th consecutive season in the top flight of Saudi football and 85th year in existence as a football club. The club participated in the Pro League and the King Cup.

The season spanned the period of 1 July 2021 to 30 June 2022.

== Players ==
=== Squad information ===
As of 1 February 2022

Note: Flags indicate national team as defined under FIFA eligibility rules; some limited exceptions apply. Players may hold more than one non-FIFA nationality.

No.	Pos.	Nation	Player
1	GK	KSA	Yasser Al-Mosailem (captain)
2	DF	KSA	Fahad Al-Hamad
3	DF	BRA	Dankler
4	DF	KSA	Talal Al-Absi
5	DF	KSA	Mohammed Al-Khabrani
6	MF	CMR	Franck Kom
7	DF	MKD	Ezgjan Alioski
8	MF	CRO	Filip Bradarić
9	FW	SYR	Omar Al Somah
10	MF	KSA	Salman Al-Moasher
11	MF	KSA	Housain Al-Mogahwi
13	DF	KSA	Hani Al-Sebyani
14	MF	KSA	Firas Al-Ghamdi
16	MF	KSA	Nooh Al-Mousa
17	FW	KSA	Haitham Asiri

No.	Pos.	Nation	Player
18	MF	BRA	Carlos Eduardo
19	FW	KSA	Mohammed Majrashi
22	GK	KSA	Abdulrahman Al-Sanbi
24	MF	KSA	Ayman Yahya (on loan from Al-Nassr)
26	MF	KSA	Mohammed Al-Majhad
27	DF	KSA	Ali Majrashi
29	MF	KSA	Abdulrahman Ghareeb
30	MF	KSA	Ziyad Al-Johani
37	DF	KSA	Abdulbasit Hindi
40	MF	KSA	Ali Al-Asmari
66	DF	KSA	Abdulrahman Al-Zahrani
70	MF	KSA	Abdullah Al-Mogren
71	GK	KSA	Mohammed Al Rubaie
77	FW	KSA	Hassan Al-Ali

=== Out on loan ===
Note: Flags indicate national team as defined under FIFA eligibility rules; some limited exceptions apply. Players may hold more than one non-FIFA nationality.

No.	Pos.	Nation	Player
20	MF	SEN	Alassane Ndao (at Antalyaspor until 30 June 2022)
23	DF	KSA	Abdullah Hassoun (at Al-Tai until 30 June 2022)
32	MF	KSA	Eyad Madani (at Jeddah until 30 June 2022)
41	DF	KSA	Manaf Abo Yabes (at Al-Jabalain until 30 June 2022)
46	DF	KSA	Rayane Hamidou (at Al-Tai until 30 June 2022)

No.	Pos.	Nation	Player
99	FW	KSA	Safi Al-Zaqrati (at Al-Nahda until 30 June 2022)
—	DF	KSA	Mohammed Bassas (at Ohod until 30 June 2022)
—	MF	KSA	Yahya Al-Qarni (at Al-Jabalain until 30 June 2022)
—	FW	CHA	Othman Alhaj (at Al-Ain until 30 June 2022)

== Transfers and loans ==
=== Transfers in ===
Entry date	Position	No.	Player	From club	Fee	Ref.
30 June 2021	DF	32	(Saudi Arabia) Faisal Darisi	(Saudi Arabia) Najran	End of loan	
30 June 2021	DF	–	(Saudi Arabia) Khaled Al-Barakah	(Saudi Arabia) Al-Hazem	End of loan	
30 June 2021	DF	–	(Saudi Arabia) Mohammed Al-Zubaidi	(Saudi Arabia) Damac	End of loan	
30 June 2021	MF	17	(Germany) Marko Marin	(Saudi Arabia) Al-Raed	End of loan	
30 June 2021	MF	14	(Saudi Arabia) Firas Al-Ghamdi	(Spain) Nàstic	End of loan	
30 June 2021	MF	–	(Saudi Arabia) Yahya Al-Qarni	(Saudi Arabia) Al-Jabalain	End of loan	
30 June 2021	FW	99	(Saudi Arabia) Safi Al-Zaqrati	(Saudi Arabia) Al-Fayha	End of loan	
1 July 2021	DF	3	(Brazil) Dankler	(Japan) Cerezo Osaka	Free	
1 July 2021	FW	19	(Saudi Arabia) Mohammed Majrashi	(Saudi Arabia) Al-Fateh	Free	
12 July 2021	MF	8	(Croatia) Filip Bradarić	(Italy) Cagliari	$1,180,000	
22 July 2021	MF	15	(Brazil) Paulinho	(China) Guangzhou	Free	
29 July 2021	DF	7	(North Macedonia) Ezgjan Alioski	(England) Leeds United	Free	
31 July 2021	MF	20	(Senegal) Alassane Ndao	(Turkey) Fatih Karagümrük	$3,560,000	
27 August 2021	DF	2	(Saudi Arabia) Fahad Al-Hamad	(Saudi Arabia) Al-Taawoun	Free	
9 October 2021	DF	21	(Tunisia) Hamdi Nagguez	(Egypt) Zamalek	Free	
2 January 2022	DF	66	(Saudi Arabia) Abdulrahman Al-Zahrani	(Saudi Arabia) Al-Hilal	Free	
10 January 2022	MF	6	(Cameroon) Franck Kom	(Qatar) Al-Rayyan	Free	
11 January 2022	MF	18	(Brazil) Carlos Eduardo	(United Arab Emirates) Shabab Al-Ahli	Free	
25 January 2022	DF	27	(Saudi Arabia) Ali Majrashi	(Saudi Arabia) Al-Shabab	$800,000	
31 January 2022	MF	70	(Saudi Arabia) Abdullah Al-Mogren	(Saudi Arabia) Al-Raed	Undisclosed	

=== Loans in ===
Start date	End date	Position	No.	Player	From club	Fee	Ref.
10 January 2022	End of season	MF	24	(Saudi Arabia) Ayman Yahya	(Saudi Arabia) Al-Nassr	None	

=== Transfers out ===
Exit date	Position	No.	Player	To club	Fee	Ref.
30 June 2021	MF	32	(Saudi Arabia) Hassan Al-Qayd	(Saudi Arabia) Al-Shabab	End of loan	
30 June 2021	FW	7	(Senegal) M'Baye Niang	(France) Stade Rennais	End of loan	
1 July 2021	DF	2	(Saudi Arabia) Saeed Al Mowalad	(Saudi Arabia) Al-Ettifaq	Free	
1 July 2021	DF	6	(Brazil) Lucas Lima	(Turkey) İstanbul Başakşehir	Free	
1 July 2021	MF	27	(Saudi Arabia) Sultan Mandash	(Saudi Arabia) Al-Fayha	$800,000	
1 July 2021	MF	35	(Saudi Arabia) Yousef Al-Harbi	(Saudi Arabia) Al-Wehda	Free	
1 July 2021	FW	14	(Saudi Arabia) Muhannad Assiri	(Saudi Arabia) Al-Shabab	Free	
4 July 2021	DF	13	(Saudi Arabia) Yazeed Al-Bakr	(Saudi Arabia) Al-Taawoun	$1,000,000	
5 July 2021	DF	–	(Saudi Arabia) Mohammed Al-Ruwaithi	(Saudi Arabia) Afif	Free	
12 July 2021	MF	–	(Saudi Arabia) Yahya Al-Qarni	(Saudi Arabia) Al-Jabalain	Free	
16 July 2021	GK	–	(Saudi Arabia) Anas Al-Shamrani	(Saudi Arabia) Al-Jabalain	Free	
16 July 2021	DF	–	(Saudi Arabia) Khaled Al-Barakah	(Saudi Arabia) Al-Hazem	Undisclosed	
4 August 2021	DF	3	(Saudi Arabia) Mohammed Al-Fatil	(Saudi Arabia) Al-Nassr	Free	
7 August 2021	MF	21	(Morocco) Driss Fettouhi	(Qatar) Al-Sailiya	Free	
17 August 2021	DF	–	(Saudi Arabia) Karam Al-Otaibi	(Saudi Arabia) Afif	Free	
19 August 2021	MF	28	(Romania) Alexandru Mitriță	(United States) New York City	End of loan	
26 August 2021	MF	–	(Saudi Arabia) Khaled Al-Hazmi	(Saudi Arabia) Al-Bukiryah	Free	
4 September 2021	DF	32	(Saudi Arabia) Faisal Darisi	(Saudi Arabia) Najran	Free	
5 September 2021	MF	55	(Serbia) Ljubomir Fejsa		Released	
8 September 2021	MF	8	(Bosnia and Herzegovina) Elvis Sarić	(Croatia) Gorica	Free	
18 September 2021	MF	17	(Germany) Marko Marin	(Hungary) Ferencváros	Free	
19 September 2021	MF	15	(Brazil) Paulinho		Released	
11 January 2022	DF	25	(Saudi Arabia) Motaz Hawsawi	(Saudi Arabia) Al-Taawoun	Free	
30 January 2022	GK	33	(Saudi Arabia) Mohammed Al-Owais	(Saudi Arabia) Al-Hilal	$1,465,000	

=== Loans out ===
Start date	End date	Position	No.	Player	To club	Fee	Ref.
8 July 2021	13 January 2022	DF	70	(Saudi Arabia) Mohammed Bassas	(Saudi Arabia) Al-Hazem	None	
28 July 2021	End of season	FW	99	(Saudi Arabia) Safi Al-Zaqrati	(Saudi Arabia) Al-Nahda	None	
30 August 2021	End of season	DF	41	(Saudi Arabia) Manaf Abo Yabes	(Saudi Arabia) Al-Jabalain	None	
1 September 2021	End of season	MF	32	(Saudi Arabia) Eyad Madani	(Saudi Arabia) Jeddah	None	
3 September 2021	End of season	FW	18	(Chad) Othman Alhaj	(Saudi Arabia) Al-Ain	None	
13 January 2022	End of season	DF	70	(Saudi Arabia) Mohammed Bassas	(Saudi Arabia) Ohod	None	
21 January 2022	End of season	MF	20	(Senegal) Alassane Ndao	(Turkey) Antalyaspor	None	
29 January 2022	End of season	DF	46	(Malawi) Rayane Hamidou	(Saudi Arabia) Al-Tai	None	
30 January 2022	End of season	DF	23	(Saudi Arabia) Abdullah Hassoun	(Saudi Arabia) Al-Tai	None	

== Pre-season ==
18 July 2021 Friendly	Al-Ahli (Saudi Arabia)	2–2	(Tunisia) AS Rejiche	Tabarka, Tunisia
17:00 WAT	Al Somah 17'; Madani 79'	Report	Khedher 70'; Abata 81'	Stadium: La Cigale Sport Complex

22 July 2021 Friendly	Al-Ahli (Saudi Arabia)	2–1	(Tunisia) ES Hammam-Sousse	Tabarka, Tunisia
17:30 WAT	Al-Moasher 26'; Al-Mogahwi 39'	Report	Ben Shwikha 10'	Stadium: La Cigale Sport Complex

25 July 2021 Friendly	Al-Ahli (Saudi Arabia)	1–0	(Tunisia) CS Sfaxien	Tabarka, Tunisia
17:30 WAT	Hamed 66'	Report		Stadium: La Cigale Sport Complex

29 July 2021 Friendly	Al-Ahli (Saudi Arabia)	1–1	(Tunisia) Stade Tunisien	Tabarka, Tunisia
17:30 WAT	Al Somah 60' (pen.)	Report	Al Sadeq 20'	Stadium: La Cigale Sport Complex

6 August 2021 Friendly	Al-Ahli (Saudi Arabia)	0–2	(Saudi Arabia) Abha	Jeddah, Saudi Arabia
19:00 AST		Report	Al-Zowayed 38' (pen.), 61'	Stadium: King Abdullah Sports City Reserve Stadium

== Competitions ==
=== Overview ===
Competition	Record							
Competition	G	W	D	L	GF	GA	GD	Win %
Pro League	30	6	14	10	38	43	−5	20.00
King Cup	2	1	0	1	3	3	+0	50.00
Total	32	7	14	11	41	46	−5	21.88

Updated to match played 27 June 2022
Source: Competitions

=== Pro League ===
==== League table ====
Pos	Team	Pld	W	D	L	GF	GA	GD	Pts	Qualification or relegation
12	Al-Taawoun	30	7	13	10	43	48	−5	34 (Note: Head-to-head points: Al-Ettifaq 3, Al-Taawoun 3. Head-to-head goal difference: Al-Ettifaq +2, Al-Taawoun –2.)	
13	Al-Batin	30	8	9	13	31	41	−10	33 (Note: Head-to-head points: Al-Batin 4, Al-Faisaly 1.)	
14	Al-Faisaly (R)	30	7	12	11	28	37	−9	33	Relegation to MS League
15	Al-Ahli (R)	30	6	14	10	38	43	−5	32	Relegation to MS League
16	Al-Hazem (R)	30	4	5	21	23	50	−27	17	Relegation to MS League

Source: spl.com
Rules for classification: 1) Points; 2) Head-to-head points; 3) Head-to-head goal difference; 4) Total goal difference; 5) Total goals scored; 6) Fair-play points (Note: Head-to-head record is used only after all the matches between the teams in question have been played).
(R) Relegated

==== Results summary ====
Overall								Home						Away					
Pld	W	D	L	GF	GA	GD	Pts	W	D	L	GF	GA	GD	W	D	L	GF	GA	GD
30	6	14	10	38	43	−5	32	4	7	4	24	21	+3	2	7	6	14	22	−8

Last updated: 27 June 2022.
Source: spl.com.sa

==== Results by round ====
Round	1	2	3	4	5	6	7	8	9	10	11	12	13	14	15	16	17	18	19	20	21	22	23	24	25	26	27	28	29	30
Ground	H	A	H	A	H	A	A	H	A	H	H	A	H	A	H	A	H	A	H	A	H	H	A	H	A	A	H	A	H	A
Result	D	D	D	D	D	L	L	W	W	D	W	L	L	L	L	D	W	D	D	W	D	L	L	W	L	D	D	D	L	D
Position	9	12	12	9	10	12	14	11	8	9	7	7	9	11	12	13	9	9	9	9	9	11	11	10	10	10	10	11	14	15

Updated to match(es) played on 27 June 2022. Source: spl.com.sa
A = Away; H = Home; W = Win; D = Draw; L = Loss

==== Matches ====
All times are local, AST (UTC+3).

Win Draw Loss Postponed

13 August 2021 1	Al-Ahli	1–1	Al-Faisaly	Jeddah
20:55	Al-Majhad 37'; Hindi (yellow card) 47'; Al-Moasher (yellow card) 55'; Hawsawi (yellow card) 66'	Report	Amalfitano 27'; Qassem (yellow card) 55'; Al-Dawsari (yellow card) 83'; Al-Qumayzi (yellow card) 90+4'	Stadium: King Abdullah Sports City; Attendance: 15,703; Referee: Khaled Al-Teris

19 August 2021 2	Al-Hazem	2–2	Al-Ahli	Ar Rass
19:10	Strandberg 35'; John 39'; Rodrigues (yellow card) 54'	Report	Al-Mogahwi (yellow card) 53'; Hassoun (yellow card) 55'; Alioski 78' (pen.); Paulinho 83'; Hindi (yellow card) 90+4'	Stadium: Al-Hazem Club Stadium; Attendance: 1,077; Referee: Mohammed Al-Esmaiel

25 August 2021 3	Al-Ahli	1–1	Damac	Jeddah
20:45	Ndao 18'; Al-Mogahwi (yellow card) 59'	Report	Soudani 19'; Munshi (yellow card) 47'; Hawsawi (yellow card) 50'	Stadium: King Abdullah Sports City; Attendance: 17,370; Referee: Majed Al-Shamrani

12 September 2021 4	Al-Taawoun	1–1	Al-Ahli	Buraidah
18:50	Tawamba 9'; Al-Mousa (yellow card) 39'	Report	Hamidou (yellow card) 29'; Paulinho 63'; Al-Khabrani (yellow card) 67'; Al-Moasher (yellow card) 90+3'	Stadium: King Abdullah Sport City Stadium; Attendance: 2,841; Referee: Faisal Al-Blwi

17 September 2021 5	Al-Ahli	1–1	Al-Fateh	Jeddah
20:30	Alioski 15' (pen.), (yellow card) 45+1'	Report	Koval (yellow card) 16'; Al-Buraikan 20'; Saâdane (yellow card) 58'	Stadium: King Abdullah Sports City; Attendance: 9,511; Referee: Turki Al-Khudhayr

23 September 2021 6	Al-Fayha	2–0	Al-Ahli	Al Majma'ah
18:30	Al-Khaibari (yellow card) 35'; Lopes 60', 68'	Report	Al-Mousa (yellow card) 51'	Stadium: Al Majma'ah Sports City; Attendance: 4,100; Referee: Shukri Al-Hanfoush

1 October 2021 7	Al-Ittihad	2–0	Al-Ahli	Jeddah
20:20	Al-Shamrani (yellow card) 12', (goal) 50'; Abdulhamid (yellow card) 57'; Hegazi 80'; Henrique (yellow card) 83'; Niakaté (yellow card) 90+1'	Report	Alioski (yellow card) 28'; Bradarić (yellow card) 44'; Al-Johani (yellow card) 90+1'	Stadium: Prince Abdullah Al-Faisal Stadium; Attendance: 14,208; Referee: Mohammed Al-Hoaish

16 October 2021 8	Al-Ahli	4–0	Al-Ettifaq	Jeddah
20:10	Al Somah 22' (pen.); Al-Majhad (yellow card) 39'; Bradarić 47', 58'; Ghareeb 68'	Report	Al-Rubaie (yellow card) 56'; Azaro (yellow card) 82'	Stadium: Prince Abdullah Al-Faisal Stadium; Attendance: 9,679; Referee: Khaled Al-Teris

21 October 2021 9	Al-Tai	1–2	Al-Ahli	Ha'il
20:00	Lucas 45+2'; Dener (yellow card) 50'; Al-Zubaidi (yellow card) 90+4'	Report	Al Somah 7', 52'; Dankler (yellow card) 56'; Al-Rubaie (yellow card) 85'	Stadium: Prince Abdul Aziz bin Musa'ed Stadium; Attendance: 7,762; Referee: Abdullah Al-Harbi

29 October 2021 10	Al-Ahli	1–1	Al-Hilal	Jeddah
19:50	Al-Asmari (yellow card) 16'; Hindi (yellow card) 42'; Ghareeb 71'; Bradarić (yellow card) 90+8'	Report	S. Al-Dawsari 10'; Cuéllar (yellow card) 33'; Al-Breik (yellow card) 42'; Kanno (yellow card) 84'; Pereira (yellow card) 90+8'	Stadium: Prince Abdullah Al-Faisal Stadium; Attendance: 24,202; Referee: Mohammed Al-Hoaish

3 November 2021 11	Al-Ahli	1–0	Al-Batin	Jeddah
19:45	Bradarić (yellow card) 57'; Maurício 66' (o.g.); Ghareeb (yellow card) 84'	Report	Chaves (yellow card) 61'	Stadium: Prince Abdullah Al-Faisal Stadium; Attendance: 14,497; Referee: Faisal Al-Blwi

21 November 2021 12	Abha	2–0	Al-Ahli	Abha
15:30	Suárez (yellow card) 61' te Vrede 75'; Bguir 85' (pen.)	Report	Bradarić (yellow card) 53'; Dankler (yellow card) 72' (yellow-red card) 80'; Asiri (yellow card) 87'	Stadium: Prince Sultan bin Abdul Aziz Stadium; Attendance: 5,176; Referee: Sultan Al-Harbi

26 November 2021 13	Al-Ahli	1–2	Al-Nassr	Jeddah
19:40	Al-Khabrani (yellow card) 10'; Ndao (yellow card) 33'; Alioski (yellow card) 65', (goal) 84'; Al-Asmari (yellow card) 67'	Report	Yahya (yellow card) 19'; Talisca (yellow card) 44', (goal) 53', 76'; Al-Shammari (yellow card) 82'	Stadium: Prince Abdullah Al-Faisal Stadium; Attendance: 18,419; Referee: Vítor Ferreira (Portugal)

27 December 2021 14	Al-Raed	1–0	Al-Ahli	Buraidah
15:20	Al-Zain 17'; Al-Farhan (yellow card) 33'; Baalghyth (yellow card) 39'; Eduardo (yellow card) 64'; Eder (yellow card) 65'	Report	Al-Asmari (yellow card) 10'; Ghareeb (yellow card) 61'	Stadium: King Abdullah Sport City Stadium; Attendance: 1,759; Referee: Khaled Al-Teris

1 January 2022 15	Al-Ahli	3–4	Al-Shabab	Jeddah
19:50	Dankler (yellow card) 14'; Asiri 39'; Alioski 44' (pen.), (yellow card) 64'; Ghareeb 52', (yellow card) 70'; Al-Khabrani (yellow card) 57'	Report	M. Majrashi 16' (o.g.); Banega 18'; Bahebri (yellow card) 33', (goal) 71'; Ighalo 73'; Al-Omran (yellow card) 90+6'	Stadium: Prince Abdullah Al-Faisal Stadium; Attendance: 7,870; Referee: Faisal Al-Blwi

11 January 2022 16	Al-Faisaly	2–2	Al-Ahli	Al Majma'ah
18:05	Faik 10'; Rossi (yellow card) 32'; Barnawi (yellow card) 39'; Guilherme 55'; Ismael (yellow card) 90+8'	Report	Al-Khabrani (yellow card) 2' (yellow-red card) 74'; Al Somah 45+4' (pen.), 81'; Al-Johani (yellow card) 73'; Al-Moasher (yellow card) 90+2'	Stadium: Al Majma'ah Sports City; Attendance: 3,412; Referee: Sami Al-Jires

15 January 2022 17	Al-Ahli	1–0	Al-Hazem	Jeddah
20:00	Alioski (yellow card) 12'; Dankler (yellow card) 38'; Al Somah 44'; Asiri (yellow card) 45+2'	Report	Moha (yellow card) 8'; Al-Obaid (yellow card) 38'	Stadium: Prince Abdullah Al-Faisal Stadium; Attendance: 8,520; Referee: Khaled Salwi

21 January 2022 18	Damac	1–1	Al-Ahli	Abha
15:55	Soudani 4'; Majrashi (red card) 83'	Report	Al Somah 40' (pen.); Al-Majhad (yellow card) 90+4'	Stadium: Prince Sultan bin Abdul Aziz Stadium; Attendance: 6,937; Referee: Ahmed Al-Rumaikhani

5 February 2022 19	Al-Ahli	1–1	Al-Taawoun	Jeddah
20:20	Ghareeb (yellow card) 44'; Alioski (yellow card) 68'; Al-Mogren 82'; Al-Hamad (yellow card) 89'	Report	Al-Saluli (yellow card) 26'; Al-Amri (yellow card) 36'; Tawamba 55' (pen.)	Stadium: Prince Abdullah Al-Faisal Stadium; Attendance: 9,240; Referee: Sultan Al-Harbi

11 February 2022 20	Al-Fateh	0–1	Al-Ahli	Al-Hasa
18:10	Batna (yellow card) 43'; Petros (yellow card) 43'; Al-Daheem (red card) 66'; Saâdane (yellow card) 66'; Cueva (red card) 71'	Report	Eduardo (yellow card) 34', (goal) 85'; Al-Hamad (yellow card) 50'	Stadium: Prince Abdullah bin Jalawi Stadium; Attendance: 6,245; Referee: Mohammed Al-Harbi

17 February 2022 21	Al-Ahli	1–1	Al-Fayha	Jeddah
18:55	Kom (yellow card) 40'; Asiri (yellow card) 87'; Alioski 90+5' (pen.)	Report	Al-Safri (yellow card) 26'; Al-Shuwaish (yellow card) 59'; Mandash 60'; Tachtsidis (yellow card) 90+8'	Stadium: Prince Abdullah Al-Faisal Stadium; Attendance: 7,031; Referee: Ahmed Al-Rumaikhani

26 February 2022 22	Al-Ahli	3–4	Al-Ittihad	Jeddah
21:00	Eduardo 45+3', (yellow card) 88'; Hindi 49', (yellow card) 90+1'; Bradarić (yellow card) 50'; Al-Majhad 73'; Kom (yellow card) 78'; Al-Khabrani (yellow card) 90' (yellow-red card) 90+4'; Al-Moasher (yellow card) 90+3'	Report	André (yellow card) 4'; Hamdallah 7', 21', 90+1' (pen.), (yellow card) 81'; Henrique (yellow card) 39'; Romarinho 41'; Al-Aboud (yellow card) 71'; Al-Shanqeeti (yellow card) 90+3'	Stadium: Prince Abdullah Al-Faisal Stadium; Attendance: 11,874; Referee: Sandro Schärer (Switzerland)

4 March 2022 23	Al-Ettifaq	1–0	Al-Ahli	Dammam
20:45	Sliti 19'; Al Salem (red card) 71'	Report	A. Majrashi (yellow card) 28'; Asiri (yellow card) 74'; Al-Mogren (yellow card) 90+6'	Stadium: Prince Mohamed bin Fahd Stadium; Attendance: 6,757; Referee: Faisal Al-Blwi

12 March 2022 24	Al-Ahli	3–1	Al-Tai	Jeddah
20:45	Kom 42'; Al Somah 48', 56' (pen.)	Report	Malele (yellow card) 12'; Sayoud 33'; Marcelo (yellow card) 55'	Stadium: Prince Abdullah Al-Faisal Stadium; Attendance: 17,582; Referee: Khaled Al-Teris

18 March 2022 25	Al-Hilal	4–2	Al-Ahli	Riyadh
20:50	Ighalo 11', 34', 45+3'; Hyun-soo (yellow card) 45'; Marega 58'	Report	Yahya (yellow card) 18'; Al Somah 69' (pen.); Alioski 90+6'	Stadium: Prince Faisal bin Fahd Stadium; Attendance: 14,775; Referee: Georgi Kabakov (Bulgaria)

5 May 2022 26	Al-Batin	2–2	Al-Ahli	Hafar al-Batin
20:50	Abreu 29' (pen.); M. Al-Qarni (yellow card) 70'; Al-Aryani 78'; Al-Shammari (yellow card) 90+6'	Report	A. Majrashi (yellow card) 18'; Kom (yellow card) 46'; Al-Asmari (yellow card) 55'; Eduardo 65'; Alioski (yellow card) 83'; Asiri 85'	Stadium: Al-Batin Club Stadium; Attendance: 4,199; Referee: Aleksei Kulbakov (Belarus)

22 May 2022 27	Al-Ahli	1–1	Abha	Jeddah
21:00	Kom (yellow card) 9'; Eduardo 44'; Ghareeb (yellow card) 62'; Al-Mogren (yellow card) 85'	Report	Bguir 37'; Mhamdi (yellow card) 90+4'	Stadium: King Abdullah Sports City; Attendance: 19,441; Referee: Ahmad Al-Rumaikhani

28 May 2022 28	Al-Nassr	1–1	Al-Ahli	Riyadh
19:20	Al-Shammari (yellow card) 54'; Anselmo (yellow card) 58'; Talisca 90+5'	Report	Al-Majhad (yellow card) 36'; Bradarić (yellow card) 62'; Ghareeb 64'; Eduardo (yellow card) 72'	Stadium: Mrsool Park; Attendance: 12,337; Referee: Faisal Al-Blwi

23 June 2022 29	Al-Ahli	1–3	Al-Raed	Jeddah
21:00	Al-Mogahwi (yellow card) 83'; Kom (yellow card) 90'; Eduardo 90+5'	Report	Baalghyth 43'; Fouzair (yellow card) 45'; R. Al-Ghamdi 60'; El Berkaoui 83'; Khamis (yellow card) 88'	Stadium: Prince Abdullah Al-Faisal Stadium; Attendance: 36,079; Referee: Facundo Tello (Argentina)

27 June 2022 30	Al-Shabab	0–0	Al-Ahli	Riyadh
21:00	Al-Qahtani (yellow card) 13'; Tambakti (yellow card) 39'; Banega (red card) 90+7'	Report	Al-Khabrani (yellow card) 80'; Hindi (yellow card) 90'	Stadium: Prince Faisal bin Fahd Stadium; Attendance: 5,687; Referee: Mohammed Al-Hoaish

=== King Cup ===
All times are local, AST (UTC+3).

21 December 2021 Round of 16	Al-Ahli	2–1	Al-Faisaly	Jeddah
20:00	Hindi (yellow card) 32'; Dankler 63'; Al Somah 88'; Al-Rubaie (yellow card) 90+2'; Hawsawi (yellow card) 90+4'; Al-Majhad (yellow card) 90+9'	Report	Barnawi (yellow card) 16'; Kaabi (yellow card) 30'; Amalfitano 45'; Rossi (yellow card) 90+5'	Stadium: Prince Abdullah Al-Faisal Stadium; Attendance: 7,516; Referee: Raed Al-Zahrani

21 February 2022 Quarter-finals	Al-Shabab	2–1	Al-Ahli	Riyadh
20:40	Carlos 49', 86' (pen.); Paulinho (yellow card) 73' (yellow-red card) 90+1'; Al-Sqoor (yellow card) 87'	Report	Ghareeb (yellow card) 27'; Bradarić 60'; Kom (yellow card) 70'; Yahya (yellow card) 73'; Dankler (yellow card) 84'	Stadium: Prince Faisal bin Fahd Stadium; Referee: Sergey Ivanov (Russia)

== Statistics ==
=== Appearances ===
Last updated on 27 June 2022.

No.	Pos	Nat	Player	Total		Pro League		King Cup	
No.	Pos	Nat	Player	Apps	Goals	Apps	Goals	Apps	Goals
Goalkeepers
1	GK	(Saudi Arabia) KSA	Yasser Al-Mosailem	4	0	3+1	0	0	0
71	GK	(Saudi Arabia) KSA	Mohammed Al-Rubaie	20	0	18	0	2	0
Defenders
2	DF	(Saudi Arabia) KSA	Fahad Al-Hamad	7	0	3+4	0	0	0
3	DF	(Brazil) BRA	Dankler	25	1	23	0	2	1
4	DF	(Saudi Arabia) KSA	Talal Al-Absi	2	0	2	0	0	0
5	DF	(Saudi Arabia) KSA	Mohammed Al-Khabrani	25	0	19+5	0	1	0
7	DF	(North Macedonia) MKD	Ezgjan Alioski	30	6	28	6	2	0
13	DF	(Saudi Arabia) KSA	Hani Al-Sebyani	1	0	0+1	0	0	0
27	DF	(Saudi Arabia) KSA	Ali Majrashi	12	0	11	0	1	0
37	DF	(Saudi Arabia) KSA	Abdulbasit Hindi	29	1	24+3	1	2	0
Midfielders
6	MF	(Cameroon) CMR	Franck Kom	13	1	12	1	1	0
8	MF	(Croatia) CRO	Filip Bradarić	27	3	22+4	2	1	1
10	MF	(Saudi Arabia) KSA	Salman Al-Moasher	17	0	4+13	0	0	0
11	MF	(Saudi Arabia) KSA	Housain Al-Mogahwi	18	0	3+14	0	0+1	0
14	MF	(Saudi Arabia) KSA	Firas Al-Ghamdi	4	0	0+4	0	0	0
16	MF	(Saudi Arabia) KSA	Nooh Al-Mousa	12	0	8+3	0	1	0
18	MF	(Brazil) BRA	Carlos Eduardo	13	5	12	5	1	0
24	MF	(Saudi Arabia) KSA	Ayman Yahya	12	0	6+5	0	1	0
26	MF	(Saudi Arabia) KSA	Mohammed Al-Majhad	28	2	21+6	2	1	0
29	MF	(Saudi Arabia) KSA	Abdulrahman Ghareeb	31	4	27+2	4	2	0
30	MF	(Saudi Arabia) KSA	Ziyad Al-Johani	10	0	2+8	0	0	0
40	MF	(Saudi Arabia) KSA	Ali Al-Asmari	15	0	10+4	0	1	0
70	MF	(Saudi Arabia) KSA	Abdullah Al-Mogren	12	1	1+10	1	0+1	0
Forwards
9	FW	(Syria) SYR	Omar Al Somah	27	11	24+1	10	2	1
17	FW	(Saudi Arabia) KSA	Haitham Asiri	24	2	11+11	2	0+2	0
19	FW	(Saudi Arabia) KSA	Mohammed Majrashi	15	0	3+11	0	0+1	0
77	FW	(Saudi Arabia) KSA	Hassan Al-Ali	2	0	0+2	0	0	0
Players sent out on loan this season
20	MF	(Senegal) SEN	Alassane Ndao	14	1	11+2	1	1	0
23	DF	(Saudi Arabia) KSA	Abdullah Hassoun	2	0	2	0	0	0
46	DF	(Malawi) MAW	Rayane Hamidou	2	0	2	0	0	0
Player who made an appearance this season but have left the club
15	MF	(Brazil) BRA	Paulinho	4	2	4	2	0	0
21	DF	(Tunisia) TUN	Hamdi Nagguez	8	0	4+4	0	0	0
25	DF	(Saudi Arabia) KSA	Motaz Hawsawi	4	0	1+2	0	0+1	0
33	GK	(Saudi Arabia) KSA	Mohammed Al-Owais	9	0	9	0	0	0
55	MF	(Serbia) SRB	Ljubomir Fejsa	1	0	0+1	0	0	0

=== Goalscorers ===
Rank	No.	Pos	Nat	Name	Pro League	King Cup	Total
1	9	FW	(Syria)	Omar Al Somah	10	1	11
2	7	DF	(North Macedonia)	Ezgjan Alioski	6	0	6
3	18	MF	(Brazil)	Carlos Eduardo	5	0	5
4	29	MF	(Saudi Arabia)	Abdulrahman Ghareeb	4	0	4
5	8	MF	(Croatia)	Filip Bradarić	2	1	3
6	15	MF	(Brazil)	Paulinho	2	0	2
6	17	FW	(Saudi Arabia)	Haitham Asiri	2	0	2
6	26	MF	(Saudi Arabia)	Mohammed Al-Majhad	2	0	2
9	3	DF	(Brazil)	Dankler	0	1	1
9	6	MF	(Cameroon)	Franck Kom	1	0	1
9	20	MF	(Senegal)	Alassane Ndao	1	0	1
9	37	DF	(Saudi Arabia)	Abdulbasit Hindi	1	0	1
9	70	MF	(Saudi Arabia)	Abdullah Al-Mogren	1	0	1
Own goal					1	0	1
Total					38	3	41

Last Updated: 23 June 2022

=== Assists ===
Rank	No.	Pos	Nat	Name	Pro League	King Cup	Total
1	7	DF	(North Macedonia)	Ezgjan Alioski	9	0	9
2	29	MF	(Saudi Arabia)	Abdulrahman Ghareeb	5	0	5
3	9	FW	(Syria)	Omar Al Somah	2	1	3
4	11	MF	(Saudi Arabia)	Housain Al-Mogahwi	0	2	2
5	5	DF	(Saudi Arabia)	Mohammed Al-Khabrani	1	0	1
5	16	MF	(Saudi Arabia)	Nooh Al-Mousa	1	0	1
5	17	FW	(Saudi Arabia)	Haitham Asiri	1	0	1
5	19	FW	(Saudi Arabia)	Mohammed Majrashi	1	0	1
5	20	MF	(Senegal)	Alassane Ndao	1	0	1
5	24	MF	(Saudi Arabia)	Ayman Yahya	1	0	1
5	70	MF	(Saudi Arabia)	Abdullah Al-Mogren	1	0	1
Total					23	3	26

Last Updated: 23 June 2022

=== Clean sheets ===
Rank	No.	Pos	Nat	Name	Pro League	King Cup	Total
1	71	GK	(Saudi Arabia)	Mohammed Al-Rubaie	4	0	4
2	1	GK	(Saudi Arabia)	Yasser Al-Mosailem	2	0	2
Total					5	0	5

Last Updated: 27 June 2022
