= Abdullah Hassoun =

Saudi Arabian footballer

Personal information
- Full name: Abdullah Hassoun Tarmin
- Date of birth: 19 March 1997 (age 29)
- Place of birth: Jeddah, Saudi Arabia
- Height: 1.76 m (5 ft 9 in)
- Position: Right-back

Team information
- Current team: Al-Riyadh
- Number: 17

Youth career
- –2018: Al-Ahli

Senior career*
Years	Team	Apps	(Gls)
2018–2022	Al-Ahli	50	(2)
2022	→ Al-Tai (loan)	6	(0)
2022–2023	Damac	19	(0)
2023–2025	Al-Qadsiah	24	(0)
2025–	Al-Riyadh	0	(0)

International career
2016–2017	Saudi Arabia U20		
2018–2021	Saudi Arabia U23		
2020–	Saudi Arabia	1	(0)
- * Club domestic league appearances and goals as of 31 May 2024

Abdullah Hassoun Tarmin (Arabic: عبدالله حسون ترمين; born 19 March 1997) is a Saudi Arabian footballer who plays for Al-Riyadh as a right-back.

== Career ==
On 14 August 2023, Hassoun joined Al-Qadsiah on a two-year contract.

On 18 October 2025, Hassoun joined Al-Riyadh on a free transfer.

== Career statistics ==
=== Club ===
As of match played 30 May 2024

Club	Season	League		King Cup		Asia		Other		Total	
Club	Season	Apps	Goals	Apps	Goals	Apps	Goals	Apps	Goals	Apps	Goals
Al-Ahli	2017–18	0	0	0	0	1	0	—		1	0
Al-Ahli	2018–19	5	0	1	0	5	0	3 (Note: Appearances in Arab Club Champions Cup)	0	14	0
Al-Ahli	2019–20	19	1	3	0	6	0	—		28	1
Al-Ahli	2020–21	24	1	1	0	6	1	—		31	2
Al-Ahli	2021–22	2	0	0	0	—		—		2	0
Al-Ahli	Total	50	2	5	0	18	1	3	0	76	3
Al-Tai (loan)	2021–22	6	0	0	0	—		—		6	0
Damac	2022–23	19	0	1	0	—		—		20	0
Al-Qadsiah	2023–24	23	0	1	0	—		—		24	0
Career totals		98	2	7	0	18	1	3	0	126	3

== Honours ==
Al-Qadsiah

- First Division League: 2023–24
