= Nooh Al-Mousa =

Saudi footballer

Personal information
- Full name: Nooh Ibrahim Mousa Al-Mousa
- Date of birth: 23 February 1991 (age 35)
- Place of birth: Al-Hasa, Saudi Arabia
- Height: 1.75 m (5 ft 9 in)
- Position: Defensive midfielder

Youth career
- Al-Fateh

Senior career*
| Years | Team | Apps | (Gls) |
| 2012–2018 | Al-Fateh | 47 | (3) |
| 2018 | → Valladolid (loan) | 0 | (0) |
| 2018–2022 | Al-Ahli | 64 | (1) |
| 2022–2025 | Al-Fateh | 28 | (0) |

International career^{‡}
| 2017–2019 | Saudi Arabia | 7 | (0) |
- * Club domestic league appearances and goals as of 28 May 2022 ‡ National team caps and goals as of 17 January 2019

Nooh Al-Mousa (Arabic: نوح الموسى; born 23 February 1991) is a Saudi football player who plays as a defensive midfielder former the Saudi Arabia national team.

== Career ==
Nooh Al-Mousa started his career with Al-Fateh where he progressed through the youth ranks. He made his debut for the first team during the 2012–13 season in the match against Al-Raed. He won the league with Al-Fateh during his first season as a first-team player. Al-Mousa became a regular starter for Al-Fateh during the 2016–17 season where he played 29 matches throughout all competitions. In 2018, as part of a deal between the Saudi Arabian Football Federation and La Liga, Al-Mousa joined Spanish club Real Valladolid on a six-month loan. On April 27, 2018, Al-Mousa signed a 4-year contract with Al-Ahli. On 6 March 2022, Al-Mousa signed a pre-contract with former club Al-Fateh. He joined the club following the expiration of his contract with Al-Ahli.

== International career ==
He made his debut against Latvia in a non-friendly game on 7 November 2017. He officially started his journey against Portugal national football team on 10 November 2017. He was called up for the 23rd Arabian Gulf Cup and started all 3 matches as the Falcons exited the competition at the group stage. Al-Mousa was called up for the 2019 AFC Asian Cup and appeared in one match, the final group stage match against Qatar.

== Career statistics ==
=== Club ===
As of match played 30 May 2024

Appearances and goals by club, season and competition
| Club | Season | League | | | National Cup | | League Cup | | Continental | | Other | | Total | |
| Club | Season | Division | Apps | Goals | Apps | Goals | Apps | Goals | Apps | Goals | Apps | Goals | Apps | Goals |
|---|---|---|---|---|---|---|---|---|---|---|---|---|---|---|
| Al-Fateh | 2012–13 | Pro League | 2 | 0 | 0 | 0 | 0 | 0 | — | | — | | 2 | 0 |
| Al-Fateh | 2013–14 | Pro League | 0 | 0 | 1 | 0 | 0 | 0 | 0 | 0 | 0 | 0 | 1 | 0 |
| Al-Fateh | 2014–15 | Pro League | 7 | 0 | 1 | 0 | 1 | 0 | — | | — | | 9 | 0 |
| Al-Fateh | 2015–16 | Pro League | 2 | 0 | 1 | 0 | 1 | 0 | — | | — | | 4 | 0 |
| Al-Fateh | 2016–17 | Pro League | 21 | 3 | 1 | 0 | 1 | 0 | 6 | 0 | — | | 29 | 3 |
| Al-Fateh | 2017–18 | Pro League | 12 | 0 | 1 | 0 | 1 | 0 | — | | — | | 14 | 0 |
| Al-Fateh | Total | | 44 | 3 | 5 | 0 | 4 | 0 | 6 | 0 | 0 | 0 | 59 | 3 |
| Real Valladolid (loan) | 2017–18 | Segunda División | 0 | 0 | 0 | 0 | — | | — | | — | | 0 | 0 |
| Al-Ahli | 2018–19 | Pro League | 19 | 1 | 2 | 1 | — | | 7 | 0 | 8 (Note: Appearance in Arab Club Champions Cup) | 0 | 36 | 2 |
| Al-Ahli | 2019–20 | Pro League | 7 | 0 | 1 | 0 | — | | 1 | 0 | — | | 9 | 0 |
| Al-Ahli | 2020–21 | Pro League | 27 | 0 | 1 | 0 | — | | 6 | 0 | — | | 34 | 0 |
| Al-Ahli | 2021–22 | Pro League | 11 | 0 | 1 | 0 | — | | — | | — | | 12 | 0 |
| Al-Ahli | Total | | 64 | 1 | 5 | 1 | 0 | 0 | 14 | 0 | 8 | 0 | 91 | 2 |
| Al-Fateh | 2022–23 | Pro League | 11 | 0 | 2 | 0 | — | | — | | — | | 13 | 0 |
| Al-Fateh | 2023–24 | Pro League | 8 | 0 | 1 | 0 | — | | — | | — | | 9 | 0 |
| Al-Fateh | Total | | 19 | 0 | 3 | 0 | 0 | 0 | 0 | 0 | 0 | 0 | 22 | 0 |
| Career total | | | 127 | 4 | 13 | 1 | 4 | 0 | 20 | 0 | 8 | 0 | 172 | 5 |

=== International ===
Statistics accurate as of match played 17 January 2019.

Saudi Arabia
| Year | Apps | Goals |
|---|---|---|
| 2017 | 6 | 0 |
| 2019 | 1 | 0 |
| Total | 7 | 0 |

== Honours ==
Al-Fateh

- Saudi Professional League: 2012–13
- Saudi Super Cup: 2013

Valladolid

- Segunda División: 2017–18
