= Mohammed Al-Majhad =

Saudi Arabian footballer

Personal information
- Full name: Mohammed Abdullah Al-Majhad
- Date of birth: 16 July 1998 (age 28)
- Place of birth: Al-Hasa, Saudi Arabia
- Height: 1.77 m (5 ft 9 1/2 in)
- Position: Midfielder

Team information
- Current team: Al-Ula
- Number: 29

Youth career
- 2011–2017: Al-Fateh

Senior career*
Years	Team	Apps	(Gls)
2017–2019	Al-Fateh	34	(4)
2019–2025	Al-Ahli	95	(3)
2025–	Al-Ula	0	(0)

International career
2016–2018	Saudi Arabia U20		
2019–2020	Saudi Arabia U23		
2019–	Saudi Arabia	2	(0)
- * Club domestic league appearances and goals as of 25 February 2025

Mohammed Al-Majhad (Arabic: محمد المجحد; born 16 July 1998) is a Saudi Arabian footballer who plays as a midfielder for Al-Ula and the Saudi Arabia national team.

== Career ==
On 30 August 2019, Al-Majhad joined Al-Ahli on a five-year deal. On 25 July 2022, Al-Majhad signed a one-year contract extension with the club. On 2 February 2024, Al-Majhad renewed his contract with the club for another three years.

On 5 August 2025, Al-Majhad joined Al-Ula on a three-year deal.

== Career statistics ==
=== Club ===
As of 27 May 2025

Club	Season	League		King Cup		Asia		Other		Total	
Club	Season	Apps	Goals	Apps	Goals	Apps	Goals	Apps	Goals	Apps	Goals
Al-Fateh	2017–18	7	0	0	0	—		1 (Note: Appearances in Crown Prince Cup)	0	8	0
Al-Fateh	2018–19	27	4	2	0	—		—		29	4
Al-Fateh	Total	34	4	2	0	0	0	1	0	37	4
Al-Ahli	2019–20	8	0	0	0	5	1	—		13	1
Al-Ahli	2020–21	5	1	0	0	1	0	—		6	1
Al-Ahli	2021–22	27	2	1	0	—		—		28	2
Al-Ahli	2022–23	23	0	—		—		—		23	0
Al-Ahli	2023–24	27	0	1	0	—		—		28	0
Al-Ahli	2024–25	5	0	0	0	0	0	0	0	5	0
Al-Ahli	Total	95	3	2	0	6	1	0	0	103	4
Al-Ula	2025–26	0	0	—		—		—		23	0
Career totals		129	7	4	0	6	1	1	0	140	8

=== International ===
Statistics accurate as of match played 10 August 2019.

Team	Year	Apps	Goals
Saudi Arabia
Saudi Arabia	2019	2	0
Saudi Arabia	Total	2	0

== Honours ==
=== Club ===
Al-Ahli

- Saudi First Division League: 2022–23
- AFC Champions League Elite: 2024–25
