= Yousef Al-Harbi =

Saudi Arabian footballer

Personal information
- Full name: Yousef Saad Mansi Al-Harbi
- Date of birth: 16 March 1997 (age 29)
- Place of birth: Jeddah, Saudi Arabia
- Height: 1.69 m (5 ft 6 1/2 in)
- Position: Midfielder

Team information
- Current team: Jeddah
- Number: 35

Youth career
- 2012–2018: Al-Ahli

Senior career*
Years	Team	Apps	(Gls)
2018–2021	Al-Ahli	18	(1)
2021–2024	Al-Wehda	3	(0)
2021–2022	→ Al-Fayha (loan)	13	(0)
2025–	Jeddah	0	(0)

International career
2016–2017	Saudi Arabia U20		
2018–2021	Saudi Arabia U23		
- * Club domestic league appearances and goals as of 27 June 2022

Yousef Al-Harbi (Arabic: يوسف الحربي; born 16 March 1997) is a Saudi Arabian footballer who plays as a midfielder for Jeddah.

== Personal life ==
He is the son of former Al-Ahli player Saad Mansi Al-Harbi. Al-Harbi's uncle is Khaled Mansi Al-Harbi and his cousin is Rayan Al-Harbi.

== Career ==
On 8 February 2021, Al-Harbi joined Al-Wehda on a pre-contract agreement. He officially joined the club following the conclusion of the 2020–21 season. On 15 July 2021, Al-Harbi joined Al-Fayha on a one-year loan.

On 19 August 2025, Al-Harbi joined FDL club Jeddah.

== Career statistics ==
=== Club ===
As of 30 May 2024

Club	Season	League		King Cup		Asia		Other		Total	
Club	Season	Apps	Goals	Apps	Goals	Apps	Goals	Apps	Goals	Apps	Goals
Al-Ahli	2018–19	7	0	2	0	3	0	4 (Note: Appearances in Arab Club Champions Cup)	0	16	0
Al-Ahli	2019–20	10	1	1	0	5	0	–		16	1
Al-Ahli	2020–21	1	0	0	0	0	0	–		1	0
Al-Ahli	Total	18	1	3	0	8	0	4	0	33	1
Al-Fayha (loan)	2021–22	13	0	1	0	–		–		14	0
Al-Wehda	2022–23	1	0	0	0	–		–		1	0
Al-Wehda	2023–24	2	0	1	0	–		0	0	3	0
Al-Wehda	Total	3	0	1	0	0	0	0	0	4	0
Jeddah	2025–26	0	0	0	0	–		–		0	0
Career totals		34	1	5	0	8	0	4	0	51	1

== Honours ==
Al-Fayha

- King Cup: 2021–22
