= Firas Al-Ghamdi =

Saudi Arabian footballer

Personal information
- Full name: Firas Seraj Al-Ghamdi
- Date of birth: 3 December 1999 (age 26)
- Place of birth: Riyadh, Saudi Arabia
- Height: 1.68 m (5 ft 6 in)
- Position: Midfielder

Team information
- Current team: Abha
- Number: 7

Senior career*
Years	Team	Apps	(Gls)
2018–2026	Al-Ahli	10	(0)
2020–2021	→ Gimnàstic (loan)	0	(0)
2023–2024	→ Al-Raed (loan)	16	(0)
2024–2025	→ Al-Arabi (loan)	13	(1)
2025–2026	→ Abha (loan)	30	(3)
2026–	Abha	4	(0)

International career
2017–2019	Saudi Arabia U20		
2021–2022	Saudi Arabia U23		
- * Club domestic league appearances and goals as of 3 September 2026 (UTC)

Firas Al-Ghamdi (Arabic: فراس الغامدي; born 3 December 1999), is a Saudi Arabian professional footballer who plays as a midfielder for Saudi Pro League club Abha.

== Career ==
Al-Ghamdi began his career at the youth teams of Al-Ahli. He made his debut on 28 December 2018 in the 2–1 league defeat to Al-Wehda. On 8 September 2020, Al-Ghamdi joined Spanish side Gimnàstic on loan. Following his return from loan, Al-Ghamdi renewed his contract with Al-Ahli on 11 October 2021. On 11 August 2023, Al-Ghamdi joined Al-Raed on loan. On 12 September 2024, Al-Ghamdi joined Al-Arabi on a one-year loan. On 10 September 2025, Al-Ghamdi joined Abha on loan.

== Career statistics ==
=== Club ===
As of 30 May 2025.

Club	Season	League			Cup		Continental		Other		Total	
Club	Season	Division	Apps	Goals	Apps	Goals	Apps	Goals	Apps	Goals	Apps	Goals
Al-Ahli	2018–19	SPL	1	0	1	0	0	0	1 (Note: Appearance(s) in Arab Club Champions Cup)	0	3	0
Al-Ahli	2019–20	SPL	0	0	0	0	0	0	—		0	0
Al-Ahli	2021–22	SPL	4	0	0	0	—		—		4	0
Al-Ahli	2022–23	FDL	5	0	—		—		—		5	0
Al-Ahli	Total		10	0	1	0	0	0	1	0	12	0
Gimnàstic (loan)	2020–21	Segunda División B	0	0	0	0	—		—		0	0
Al-Raed (loan)	2023–24	SPL	16	0	1	0	—		—		17	0
Al-Arabi (loan)	2024–25	FDL	13	1	1	0	—		—		14	1
Career total			39	1	3	0	0	0	1	0	43	1
