= Omar Al-Zayni =

Saudi association football player

Omar Al-Zayni عمر الزيني
Personal information
- Full name: Omar Al-Zayni
- Date of birth: 20 January 1996 (age 30)
- Place of birth: Jeddah, Saudi Arabia
- Height: 1.73 m (5 ft 8 in)
- Position: Midfielder

Youth career
- Al-Ahli

Senior career*
Years	Team	Apps	(Gls)
2017–2018	Hajer	0	(0)
2018	Al-Entesar		
2018–2019	Al-Ahli	1	(0)
2019	→ Ohod (loan)	0	(0)
2019–2022	Al-Qadsiah	26	(0)
2022–2023	Jeddah	23	(0)
2023–2024	Al-Adalah		
- * Club domestic league appearances and goals

Omar Al-Zayni (Arabic: عمر الزيني; born 20 January 1996) is a Saudi Arabian professional footballer who plays as a midfielder.

== Career ==
Al-Zayni began his career at the youth team of Al-Ahli. On 25 August 2018, Al-Zayni joined MS League side Hajer. In early 2018, Al-Zayni joined Saudi Third Division side Al-Entesar. In 2018, Al-Zayni returned to Al Al-Ahli with a new contract. On 1 September 2019, Al-Zayni joined MS League side Al-Qadsiah from Al-Ahli. On 24 August 2022, Al-Zayni joined Jeddah. On 25 June 2023, Al-Zayni joined Al-Adalah.
