= Khaled Al-Barakah =

Saudi Arabian footballer

Personal information
- Full name: Khaled Abdulaziz Al-Barakah
- Date of birth: December 5, 1990 (age 35)
- Place of birth: Ar Rass, Saudi Arabia
- Height: 1.78 m (5 ft 10 in)
- Position: Left back

Senior career*
Years	Team	Apps	(Gls)
2011–2015	Al-Hazem		
2015–2017	Hajer	20	(0)
2017–2019	Al-Hazem	51	(1)
2019–2021	Al-Ahli	1	(0)
2020	→ Al-Ettifaq (loan)	1	(0)
2020–2021	→ Al-Hazem (loan)	35	(2)
2021–2023	Al-Hazem	16	(0)
2023–2024	Al-Najma	21	(0)
- * Club domestic league appearances and goals

Khaled Al-Barakah (Arabic: خالد البركة; born December 5, 1990) is a retired Saudi professional footballer who played as a left back for Al-Hazem, Hajer, Al-Ahli, Al-Ettifaq and Al-Najma.

== Career ==
On 9 October 2020, Al-Barakah joined Al-Hazem on a season-long loan.

On 12 July 2021, Al-Barakah joined Al-Hazem on a permanent deal.

On 6 July 2023, Al-Barakah joined Al-Najma.

On 25 June 2024, Al-Barakah retired from football and was appointed as the director of football at former club Al-Hazem.

== Honours ==
Al-Hazem

- MS League: 2020–21
