= Othman Alhaj =

Chadian footballer (born 1994)

Rangi
Personal information
- Full name: Othman Yahya Alhaj Hassan
- Date of birth: 14 July 1994 (age 32)
- Place of birth: Jeddah, Saudi Arabia
- Height: 1.83 m (6 ft 0 in)
- Position: Striker

Team information
- Current team: Al-Khaldiya
- Number: 26

Senior career*
| Years | Team | Apps | (Gls) |
| 2018–2019 | Jeddah | 15 | (9) |
| 2019–2022 | Al-Ahli | 5 | (1) |
| 2019–2020 | → Al-Fayha (loan) | 14 | (1) |
| 2021–2022 | → Al-Ain (loan) | 20 | (0) |
| 2022–2023 | Sitra | 20 | (9) |
| 2023– | Al-Khaldiya | 0 | (0) |
- * Club domestic league appearances and goals as of 9 May 2023

Othman Yahya Alhaj Hassan (Arabic: عثمان يحيى الحاج حسن; born 7 January 1994), commonly known as Rangi, is a Saudi Arabian-born Chadian professional footballer who plays as a striker for Bahraini club Al-Khaldiya.

On 7 September 2022, Alhaj joined Bahraini side Sitra on a free transfer. On 8 July 2023, Alhaj joined Al-Khaldiya.
