= Faisal Darisi =

Saudi Arabian footballer

Faisal Darisi فيصل دارسي
Personal information
- Full name: Faisal Mohammed Darisi
- Date of birth: 11 February 1997 (age 29)
- Place of birth: Saudi Arabia
- Height: 1.80 m (5 ft 11 in)
- Position: Centre-back

Team information
- Current team: Al-Fateh
- Number: 5

Youth career
- 2011–2018: Al-Ahli

Senior career*
Years	Team	Apps	(Gls)
2017–2021	Al-Ahli	1	(0)
2019–2020	→ Al-Raed (loan)	3	(0)
2020–2021	→ Najran (loan)	20	(0)
2021–2023	Najran	67	(1)
2023–2025	Al-Jandal	46	(0)
2025–	Al-Fateh	0	(0)

International career^{‡}
2018–2019	Saudi Arabia U23		
- * Club domestic league appearances and goals as of 31 August 2019 ‡ National team caps and goals as of 31 August 2019

Faisal Darisi (Arabic: فيصل دارسي; born 11 February 1997) is a Saudi Arabian professional footballer who plays for Al-Fateh as a centre-back.

== Career ==
Darisi is an academy graduate of Al-Ahli. He made his debut for the first team in the King Cup quarter-final match against Al-Fayha. On 31 July 2018, Darisi signed a three-year professional contract with Al-Ahli. He made his league debut for Al-Ahli on 28 March 2019, in the eventual 5–4 loss against Al-Raed. On 10 July 2019, Darisi joined Al-Raed on loan until the end of the 2019–20 season.

On 11 July 2023, Darisi joined Al-Jandal.

On 26 August 2025, Darisi joined Al-Fateh on a three-year deal.
