= Hani Al-Sebyani =

Saudi Arabian footballer

Hani Al-Sibiyani
Personal information
- Full name: Hani Ismaeel Al-Sebyani
- Date of birth: 21 July 1998 (age 28)
- Place of birth: Saudi Arabia
- Position: Left back

Team information
- Current team: Al-Wehda
- Number: 3

Youth career
- 2013-2018: Al-Ahli

Senior career*
Years	Team	Apps	(Gls)
2018–2023	Al-Ahli	5	(0)
2019–2020	→ Al-Fayha (loan)	12	(0)
2022–2023	→ Al-Khaleej (loan)	10	(0)
2023–2025	Al-Faisaly	48	(0)
2026–	Al-Wehda	0	(0)

International career
2017–2019	Saudi Arabia U20		
2021–2022	Saudi Arabia U23		
- * Club domestic league appearances and goals

Hani Ismaeel Al-Sebyani (Arabic: هاني إسماعيل الصبياني; born 21 July 1998) is a Saudi professional footballer who plays for Al-Wehda as a left back.

== Career ==
Al-Sebyani began his career at the youth team of Al-Ahli. On 4 August 2019, Al-Sebyani joined Pro League side Al-Fayha on loan for the 2019–20 season. On 30 May 2021, Al-Sebyani renewed his contract with Al-Ahli until 2024. On 31 August 2022, Al-Sebyani joined Al-Khaleej on loan. On 7 September 2023, Al-Sebyani joined First Division side Al-Faisaly. On 28 January 2026, Al-Sebyani joined Al-Wehda.
