= Mohammed Al-Zubaidi =

Saudi Arabian footballer

Personal information
- Full name: Mohammed Ali Al-Zubaidi
- Date of birth: August 25, 1997 (age 29)
- Height: 1.73 m (5 ft 8 in)
- Position: Left back

Youth career
- Al-Ettifaq

Senior career*
Years	Team	Apps	(Gls)
2016–2018	Al-Ettifaq	4	(0)
2018–2022	Al-Ahli	3	(0)
2019–2020	→ Al-Hazem (loan)	14	(1)
2020–2021	→ Damac (loan)	13	(0)
2022–2023	Al-Orobah	28	(0)
2023–2024	Al-Taraji		

International career
2016–2018	Saudi Arabia U-20		
2018–2020	Saudi Arabia U-23		
- * Club domestic league appearances and goals as of 13 April 2018

Mohammed Al-Zubaidi (Arabic: محمد الزبيدي; born 25 August 1997) is a Saudi professional footballer who currently plays as a full back.

== Career ==
On 10 August 2022, Al-Zubaidi joined First Division side Al-Orobah on a free transfer.

On 22 June 2023, Al-Zubaidi joined Al-Taraji.
