= Mohammed Bassas =

Saudi Arabian association football player

Mohammed Bassas محمد بصاص
Personal information
- Full name: Mohammed Mazin Bassas
- Date of birth: 31 August 1998 (age 28)
- Place of birth: Jeddah, Saudi Arabia
- Height: 1.75 m (5 ft 9 in)
- Position: Centre-back

Youth career
- –2018: Al-Ahli

Senior career*
Years	Team	Apps	(Gls)
2018–2023	Al-Ahli	3	(0)
2019	→ Al-Taawoun (loan)	0	(0)
2021–2022	→ Al-Hazem (loan)	1	(0)
2022	→ Ohod (loan)	15	(0)
2022–2023	→ Ohod (loan)	8	(0)
2023–2024	Al-Bukiryah		
- * Club domestic league appearances and goals

Mohammed Bassas (Arabic: محمد بصاص; born 31 August 1998) is a Saudi Arabian footballer who plays as a centre-back.

== Career ==
Bassas began his career at the youth team of Al-Ahli. He was promoted to the first team in 2018. On 4 February 2019, Bassas joined Al-Taawoun on loan from Al-Ahli. On 8 July 2021, Bassas joined Al-Hazem on loan. After making just one appearance for the club, the loan was cut short. On 13 January 2022, Bassas joined Ohod on loan until the end of the season. On 25 July 2022, Bassas joined Ohod on a one-year loan. On 12 September 2023, Bassas joined Al-Bukiryah.

== Career statistics ==
=== Club ===
As of 17 March 2020

Club	Season	League		King Cup		Asia		Other		Total	
Club	Season	Apps	Goals	Apps	Goals	Apps	Goals	Apps	Goals	Apps	Goals
Al-Ahli	2019–20	2	0	0	0	0	0	0	0	2	0
Al-Ahli	Total	2	0	0	0	0	0	0	0	2	0
Career totals		2	0	0	0	0	0	0	0	2	0

== Honours ==
Al-Taawoun

- King Cup: 2019
