= Safi Al-Zaqrati =

Saudi Arabian association football player

Safi Al-Zaqrati صافي الزقرتي
Personal information
- Full name: Safi Mohammed Al-Zaqrati
- Date of birth: 19 April 1999 (age 27)
- Place of birth: Saudi Arabia
- Position: Forward

Team information
- Current team: Al-Nojoom
- Number: 70

Youth career
- –2018: Al-Ahli

Senior career*
Years	Team	Apps	(Gls)
2018–2022	Al-Ahli	2	(0)
2020–2021	→ Al-Fayha (loan)	4	(0)
2021–2022	→ Al-Nahda (loan)	15	(0)
2023–2024	Jeddah	11	(0)
2024–2025	Al-Entesar		
2025–	Al-Nojoom		

International career^{‡}
2018–2019	Saudi Arabia U19	4	(2)
- * Club domestic league appearances and goals as of January 3, 2019 ‡ National team caps and goals as of January 3, 2019

Safi Al-Zaqrati (Arabic: صافي الزقرتي; born 19 April 1999) is a Saudi Arabian footballer who plays for Al-Nojoom as a striker.

== Career ==
Al-Zaqrati is an academy graduate of Al-Ahli. He was first called up to the first team in December 2018 in the league match against Al-Wehda. On 20 October 2020, Al-Zaqrati joined Al-Fayha on loan. On 28 July 2021, Al-Zaqrati joined Al-Nahda on loan. On 17 January 2023, Al-Zaqrati joined Jeddah. In October 2025, Al-Zaqarti joined Al-Nojoom.

== Honours ==
=== International ===
Saudi Arabia U19

- AFC U-19 Championship: 2018
