= Mohammed Majrashi =

Saudi Arabian footballer

Personal information
- Full name: Mohammed Yahya Majrashi
- Date of birth: May 20, 1991 (age 35)
- Place of birth: Jeddah, Saudi Arabia
- Height: 1.80 m (5 ft 11 in)
- Position: Striker

Team information
- Current team: Al-Anwar
- Number: 20

Senior career*
Years	Team	Apps	(Gls)
2011–2016	Al-Ahli	3	(0)
2014–2015	→ Najran (loan)	16	(1)
2015–2016	→ Al-Taawoun (loan)	8	(0)
2016–2019	Al-Faisaly	40	(4)
2019	→ Ohod (loan)	11	(3)
2019–2021	Al-Fateh	37	(5)
2021–2022	Al-Ahli	14	(0)
2022–2024	Al-Fayha	19	(0)
2024–2025	Al-Faisaly	27	(4)
2025–	Al-Anwar	0	(0)

International career
2011	Saudi Arabia U-20	4	(0)
2012–2014	Saudi Arabia U-23	7	(6)
- * Club domestic league appearances and goals as of 14 April 2018

Mohammed Yahya Majrashi (Arabic: محمد يحيى مجرشي; born 20 May 1991) is a Saudi Arabian professional footballer who plays as a striker for Al-Anwar. He played at the 2011 FIFA U-20 World Cup and 2013 AFC U-22 Asian Cup qualification.

== Career ==
On 18 August 2024, Majrashi joined Al-Faisaly on a free transfer.

On 20 September 2025, Majrashi joined Al-Anwar.

== International goals ==
No.	Date	Venue	Opponent	Score	Result	Competition
1.	31 December 2014	Jassim bin Hamad Stadium, Doha, Qatar	Qatar	1–1	1–4	2014 WAFF Championship
