= Yahya Al-Qarni =

Saudi Arabian footballer

Personal information
- Full name: Yahya Mohammed Al-Qarni
- Date of birth: 4 May 1998 (age 28)
- Place of birth: Saudi Arabia
- Height: 1.67 m (5 ft 5 1/2 in)
- Position: Midfielder

Team information
- Current team: Al-Bukiryah
- Number: 15

Youth career
- 2011–2018: Al-Ahli

Senior career*
Years	Team	Apps	(Gls)
2018–2021	Al-Ahli	0	(0)
2019–2020	→ Ohod (loan)	34	(0)
2020–2021	→ Al-Jabalain (loan)	26	(0)
2021–2022	Al-Jabalain	27	(1)
2022–2024	Al-Batin	31	(3)
2024–2025	Al-Faisaly	15	(1)
2025–	Al-Bukiryah		
- * Club domestic league appearances and goals as of 10 April 2023

Yahya Al-Qarni (Arabic: يحيى القرني; born 4 May 1998) is a Saudi Arabian professional footballer who plays as a midfielder for Al-Bukiryah.

== Career ==
On 21 July 2022, Al-Qarni joined Pro League side Al-Batin on a two-year deal from Al-Jabalain.

On 17 July 2024, Al-Qarni joined Al-Faisaly.

On 10 August 2025, Al-Qarni joined Al-Bukiryah.
