= 2016–17 Al-Ahli Saudi FC season =

Al-Ahli
2016–17 season
- President: Musaad Al Zuwaihary (until 31 August 2016); Ahmad Al-Marzouqi (from 26 September 2016)
- Manager: José Manuel Gomes (until 30 September 2016); Christian Gross (from 3 October 2016)
- Stadium: King Abdullah Sports City
- Pro League: 2nd
- King Cup: Runners-up
- Crown Prince Cup: Semi-finals
- Super Cup: Winners
- AFC Champions League: Quarter-finals
- Top goalscorer: League: Omar Al Somah (24); All: Omar Al Somah (40)
- Highest home attendance: 51,659 vs Al-Hilal (25 November 2016)
- Lowest home attendance: 2,241 vs Al-Taawoun (4 May 2017)
- Average home league attendance: 20,689
Home colours	Away colours	Third colours
- All statistics correct as of 29 May 2017.

The 2016–17 season was Al-Ahli's 41st consecutive season in the top flight of Saudi football and 79th year in existence as a football club. The club started the season facing Al-Hilal in the Saudi Super Cup, winning the game on penalties. As well as this, the club also competed in the Pro League, the AFC Champions League, and the two domestic cups, the Crown Prince Cup and the King Cup. They entered the season as defending champions of both the League and King Cup.

== Players ==
=== Squad information ===
As of 26 January 2017

Note: Flags indicate national team as defined under FIFA eligibility rules; some limited exceptions apply. Players may hold more than one non-FIFA nationality.

No.	Pos.	Nation	Player
1	GK	KSA	Yasser Al Mosailem
2	DF	KSA	Ali Al-Zubaidi
4	MF	KSA	Waleed Bakshween
5	MF	KSA	Fahad Hamad
6	DF	KSA	Mohammed Al Fatil
7	MF	KSA	Salman Al-Moasher
8	MF	KSA	Taisir Al-Jassim (Captain)
9	FW	SYR	Omar Al Soma
10	MF	GRE	Giannis Fetfatzidis
11	MF	KSA	Housain Al-Mogahwi
13	DF	EGY	Mohamed Abdel-Shafy
14	FW	KSA	Muhannad Assiri
16	MF	KSA	Maher Othman
17	MF	KSA	Ayman Al-Khulaif
20	FW	KSA	Islam Seraj

No.	Pos.	Nation	Player
21	DF	KSA	Ageel Balghaith
22	GK	KSA	Ahmed Al-Rehaili
23	DF	KSA	Saeed Al-Mowalad
24	MF	KSA	Ali Awagi
25	DF	KSA	Motaz Hawsawi
26	DF	KSA	Mohammed Aman
27	MF	KSA	Hamdan Al-Shamrani
30	DF	KSA	Saeed Al-Robeai
31	DF	KSA	Mansoor Al-Harbi
44	GK	KSA	Ayman Al-Hussaini
45	MF	KSA	Abdulfattah Asiri
47	MF	KSA	Mustafa Bassas
55	MF	IRQ	Saad Abdul-Amir
66	GK	KSA	Basem Atallah
77	DF	KSA	Amiri Kurdi

== New contracts ==
No.	Pos	Player	Contract length	Contract end	Date	Source
40	CM	(Saudi Arabia) Raed Al-Ghamdi	4 years	2020	29 June 2016	
4	DM	(Saudi Arabia) Waleed Bakshween	4 years	2020	13 July 2016	
21	RB	(Saudi Arabia) Ageel Balghaith	3 years	2019	18 July 2016	
77	RB	(Saudi Arabia) Amiri Kurdi	2 years	2020	18 July 2016	
35	ST	(Saudi Arabia) Mohammed Al-Harthi	2 years	2018	21 July 2016	
30	CB	(Saudi Arabia) Saeed Al-Robeai	5 years	2021	26 July 2016	
9	ST	(Syria) Omar Al-Somah	2 years	2020	31 July 2016	
80	DM	(Saudi Arabia) Ryan Al-Mousa	2 years	2020	15 August 2016	
7	LM	(Saudi Arabia) Salman Al-Moasher	2 years	2020	19 August 2016	
66	GK	(Saudi Arabia) Basem Atallah	2 years	2018	25 August 2016	
14	ST	(Saudi Arabia) Muhannad Assiri	4 years	2020	3 December 2016	
1	GK	(Saudi Arabia) Yasser Al Mosailem	4 years	2020	29 December 2016	
10	AM	(Greece) Giannis Fetfatzidis	2 years	2019	22 April 2017	

== Transfers ==
=== In ===
==== Summer ====
No.	Pos	Player	Transferred From	Fee	Date	Source
24	LM	(Saudi Arabia) Ali Awagi	(Saudi Arabia) Al-Wehda	£2,980,000	9 June 2016	
18	DM	(Brazil) Luíz Carlos	(Portugal) Braga	Free	14 July 2016	
45	RM	(Saudi Arabia) Abdulfattah Asiri	(Saudi Arabia) Al-Ittihad	Free	17 August 2016	

==== Winter ====
No.	Pos	Player	Transferred From	Fee	Date	Source
23	RB	(Saudi Arabia) Saeed Al-Mowalad	(Saudi Arabia) Al-Raed	Free	2 January 2017	
55	DM	(Iraq) Saad Abdul-Amir	(Saudi Arabia) Al-Qadisiyah	£975,000	12 January 2017	

=== Out ===
==== Summer ====
No.	Pos	Player	Transferred To	Fee	Date	Source
3	CB	(Saudi Arabia) Osama Hawsawi	(Saudi Arabia) Al-Hilal	Free	1 July 2016	
17	LM	(Saudi Arabia) Majed Kanabah	(Saudi Arabia) Unattached	Free	1 July 2016	
77	ST	(Saudi Arabia) Samer Salem	(Saudi Arabia) Unattached	Free	1 July 2016	
7	AM	(Saudi Arabia) Ahmed Al-Aoufi	(Saudi Arabia) Al-Ittihad	Free	9 July 2016	
22	GK	(Saudi Arabia) Abdullah Al-Mayouf	(Saudi Arabia) Al-Hilal	Free	12 July 2016	
29	DM	(Saudi Arabia) Zakaria Sami	(Saudi Arabia) Al-Khaleej	Free	12 July 2016	
18	CM	(Saudi Arabia) Abdullah Al-Mutairi	(Saudi Arabia) Al-Faisaly	Free	13 July 2016	
99	CB	(Saudi Arabia) Kamel Al-Mousa	(Saudi Arabia) Al-Wehda	Free	21 July 2016	
49	RM	(Saudi Arabia) Sultan Al-Sawadi	(Saudi Arabia) Al-Raed	Free	25 July 2016	
-	DM	(Saudi Arabia) Abdullah Al-Mohammed	(Saudi Arabia) Al-Khaleej	Free	23 August 2016	

==== Winter ====
No.	Pos	Player	Transferred To	Fee	Date	Source
18	DM	(Brazil) Luíz Carlos	(Turkey) Osmanlıspor	Free	26 January 2017	

=== Loan out ===
==== Summer ====
No.	Pos	Player	Loaned To	Start	End	Source
—	ST	(Saudi Arabia) Mostafa Al-Musawi	(Saudi Arabia) Al-Khaleej	8 July 2016	30 June 2017	
32	CB	(Saudi Arabia) Hamed Al-Sherif	(Saudi Arabia) Al-Ettifaq	13 July 2016	20 January 2017	
28	LB	(Saudi Arabia) Abdulelah Bokhari	(Saudi Arabia) Al-Khaleej	17 August 2016	30 June 2017	
19	ST	(Saudi Arabia) Yasser Al-Fahmi	(Saudi Arabia) Al-Wehda	25 August 2016	30 June 2017	
15	LW	(Saudi Arabia) Saleh Al-Amri	(Saudi Arabia) Al-Ettifaq	25 August 2016	30 June 2017	

==== Winter ====
No.	Pos	Player	Loaned To	Start	End	Source
35	ST	(Saudi Arabia) Mohammed Al-Harthi	(Saudi Arabia) Al-Batin	15 January 2017	30 June 2017	
32	CB	(Saudi Arabia) Hamed Al-Sherif	(Saudi Arabia) Hajer	21 January 2017	30 June 2017	
40	RM	(Saudi Arabia) Raed Al-Ghamdi	(Saudi Arabia) Al-Khaleej	23 January 2017	30 June 2017	
80	DM	(Saudi Arabia) Ryan Al-Mousa	(Saudi Arabia) Al-Raed	25 January 2017	30 June 2017	

=== Overall transfer activity ===
==== Spending ====
Summer: ▼£2,980,000

Winter: ▼£975,000

Total: ▼£3,955,000

==== Income ====
Summer: ▲£0,000,000

Winter: ▲£0,000,000

Total: ▲£0,000,000

==== Expenditure ====
Summer: ▼£2,980,000

Winter: ▼£975,000

Total: ▼£3,955,000

== Pre-season and friendlies ==
Al-Ahli preceded their 2016-17 campaign with a friendly against Jeddah Club, a tour of Spain and Qatar and faced Barcelona in the Qatar Airways Cup midway through the season.

14 July 2016 Friendly	Al-Ahli (Saudi Arabia)	6–0	(Saudi Arabia) Jeddah Club	Jeddah
20:15 AST	Aman 18'; Al-Somah 27'; Al-Amri 43'; Al-Shamrani 55'; Al-Ghamdi 89'; Al-Khatib 90'	Report		Stadium: Prince Abdullah Al Faisal Stadium

22 July 2016 Friendly	Al-Ahli (Saudi Arabia)	2–2	(Spain) Getafe	Marbella, Spain
18:30 WET	Al-Harbi 65'; Al-Somah 88'	Report	Fuster 40'; Gorosito 71'	Stadium: Estadio Municipal de Marbella

25 July 2016 Friendly	Middlesbrough (England)	2–0	(Saudi Arabia) Al-Ahli	Marbella, Spain
23:00 WET	Nugent 58'; De Sart 68'	Report		Stadium: Estadio Municipal de Marbella

27 July 2016 Friendly	Alcorcón (Spain)	0–1	(Saudi Arabia) Al-Ahli	Marbella, Spain
18:30 WET		Report	Al-Mogahwi 83'	Stadium: Estadio Municipal de Marbella

30 July 2016 Friendly	Granada (Spain)	0–0	(Saudi Arabia) Al-Ahli	Marbella, Spain
19:30 WET		Report		Stadium: Estadio Municipal de Marbella

3 August 2016 Friendly	Málaga (Spain)	3–1	(Saudi Arabia) Al-Ahli	Marbella, Spain
19:00 WET	Fornals 22'; Charles 25'; Kuki Zalazar 80'	Report	Awagi 78'	Stadium: Estadio Municipal de Marbella

4 September 2016 Friendly	Qatar	0–3	(Saudi Arabia) Al-Ahli	Doha, Qatar
19:00 AST			Al-Shamrani 36'; Fetfatzidis 48'; Al-Somah 90'	Stadium: Suheim Bin Hamad Stadium

7 September 2016 Friendly	Al-Gharafa (Qatar)	0–2	(Saudi Arabia) Al-Ahli	Doha, Qatar
18:55 AST			Al-Zabeidi 32'; Aman 62'	Stadium: Thani bin Jassim Stadium

8 October 2016 Friendly	Al-Ahli (Saudi Arabia)	6–2	(Saudi Arabia) Jeddah Club	Jeddah
18:50 AST	Fetfatzidis 8'; Al-Somah 18', 37'; Assiri 34'; Balghaith 73'; Seraj 81'			Stadium: Prince Abdullah Al Faisal Stadium

12 November 2016 Friendly	Al-Ahli (Saudi Arabia)	6–1	(Saudi Arabia) Weg	Jeddah
18:25 AST	Al-Robeai 5', 29'; Fetfatzidis 9'; Al-Ghamdi 46', 51'; Awagi 77'		Voinea 11'	Stadium: Prince Abdullah Al Faisal Stadium

13 December 2016 Qatar Airways Cup	Al-Ahli (Saudi Arabia)	3–5	(Spain) Barcelona	Doha, Qatar
19:00 AST	Abdulrahman 51' (pen.); Assiri 60', 65'	Report	Suárez 8'; Messi 10'; Neymar 17'; Alcácer 55'; Rafinha 58'	Stadium: Thani bin Jassim Stadium; Attendance: 18,126; Referee: Fahad Al-Marri

== Competitions ==
=== Overview ===
Competition	Record								Started round	Final position / round	First match	Last match
Competition	G	W	D	L	GF	GA	GD	Win %	Started round	Final position / round	First match	Last match
Professional League	26	17	4	5	57	30	+27	65.38	—	2nd	14 August 2016	4 May 2017
King Cup	5	4	0	1	16	5	+11	80.00	Round of 32	Runners-up	20 January 2017	18 May 2017
Crown Prince Cup	3	2	0	1	10	5	+5	66.67	Round of 16	Semi-finals	27 September 2016	27 December 2016
Champions League	8	4	3	1	14	9	+5	50.00	Group stage	In Progress	21 February 2017	In Progress
Saudi Super Cup	1	1	0	0	1	1	+0	100.00	Final	Winners	8 August 2016	
Total	43	28	7	8	98	50	+48	65.12				

Updated to match played 29 May 2017
Source: Competitions

=== Saudi Super Cup ===
As a result of winning both the league and Kings Cup, Al-Ahli were scheduled to face Al-Hilal, who won the Crown Prince Cup, in their 1st Saudi Super Cup appearance. Al-Ahli won the match on penalties.

8 August 2016	Al-Ahli	1–1 (4–3 p)	Al-Hilal	London, England
19:30 UTC+1	Al-Somah 69'	Report	Al-Breik (yellow card) 48', (goal) 61'	Stadium: Craven Cottage; Attendance: 16,365; Referee: Sébastien Delferière (Belgium)
	Penalties
	Carlos (penalty missed); Hawsawi (penalty scored); Bassas (penalty scored); Al-Mogahwi (penalty scored); Al-Somah (penalty scored)		(penalty scored) Al-Qahtani; (penalty scored) Al-Shamrani; (penalty missed) Hawsawi; (penalty missed) Al-Ruwaili; (penalty scored) S. Al-Dawsari

=== Pro League ===
==== League table ====
Pos	Team	Pld	W	D	L	GF	GA	GD	Pts	Qualification or relegation
1	Al-Hilal (C)	26	21	3	2	63	16	+47	66	Qualification to AFC Champions League group stage
2	Al-Ahli	26	17	4	5	57	30	+27	55	Qualification to AFC Champions League group stage
3	Al-Nassr	26	16	4	6	44	25	+19	52 (Note: Al-Nassr finished ahead of Al-Ittihad on head-to-head points: Al-Ittihad 0–1 Al-Nassr, Al-Nassr 1–1 Al-Ittihad)	
4	Al-Ittihad (Note: Al-Ittihad were docked 3 points for failing to pay over debts.)	26	17	4	5	57	37	+20	52	
5	Al-Raed	26	11	2	13	37	47	−10	35	

Updated to match(es) played on 4 May 2017. Source: slstat.com
Rules for classification: 1) Points; 2) Head-to-head points; 3) Head-to-head goal difference; 4) Total goal difference; 5) Total goals scored; 6) Play-off (only for deciding champion, relegation and AFC competitions participation).
(C) Champions

==== Results summary ====
Overall								Home						Away					
Pld	W	D	L	GF	GA	GD	Pts	W	D	L	GF	GA	GD	W	D	L	GF	GA	GD
26	17	4	5	57	30	+27	55	9	2	2	27	11	+16	8	2	3	30	19	+11

Last updated: 4 May 2017.
Source: Competitive matches

==== Results by round ====
Round	1	2	3	4	5	6	7	8	9	10	11	12	13	14	15	16	17	18	19	20	21	22	23	24	25	26
Ground	A	A	A	H	H	A	H	H	A	H	A	H	A	H	H	H	A	A	H	A	A	H	A	H	A	H
Result	W	W	L	D	W	L	W	W	W	L	W	W	W	W	W	W	W	L	L	D	W	D	D	W	W	W
Position	1	1	3	5	3	5	5	5	3	5	4	4	3	2	2	2	2	2	4	3	3	3	4	4	3	2

Updated to match(es) played on 4 May 2017. Source: Competitive matches
A = Away; H = Home; W = Win; D = Draw; L = Loss

==== Matches ====
All times are local, AST (UTC+3).

Win Draw Loss Postponed

14 August 2016 1	Al-Ettifaq	1–4	Al-Ahli	Dammam
20:45	Otain (yellow card) 16'; Kanno 67', (yellow card) 71'; Hazazi (yellow card) 80'; Al-Dossari (yellow card) 83'	Report	Al-Somah 45+1', 81' (pen.); Bassas 63'; Al-Jassim 85'	Stadium: Prince Mohamed bin Fahd Stadium; Attendance: 6,350; Referee: Mohammed Al-Hoaish

20 August 2016 2	Al-Fateh	0–1	Al-Ahli	Al-Hasa
21:05	Al-Fuhaid (yellow card) 38'; Al Bulaihi (yellow card) 73'	Report	Hawsawi 11'; Al-Somah (yellow card) 67'	Stadium: Prince Abdullah bin Jalawi Stadium; Attendance: 4,179; Referee: Khalid Al-Teris

18 September 2016 3	Al-Shabab	3–2	Al-Ahli	Riyadh
20:45	Muath (yellow card) 10'; Benyettou 52', 54', 82'; Benlamri (yellow card) 57'	Report	Al Somah 12' (pen.), 58'	Stadium: King Fahd International Stadium; Attendance: 3,101; Referee: Abdulrahman Al-Sultan

23 September 2016 4	Al-Ahli	1–1	Al-Ittihad	Jeddah
20:45	Bassas (yellow card) 3'; Al-Nakhli 74' (o.g.)	Report	Kahraba (yellow card) 14'; F. Al-Muwallad 78'	Stadium: King Abdullah Sports City; Attendance: 49,732; Referee: Khaled Salwi

15 October 2016 5	Al-Ahli	2–0	Al-Qadisiyah	Jeddah
20:00	Al-Somah 39' (pen.), 86'; Bassas (yellow card) 66'	Report	Barnawi (yellow card) 54'	Stadium: King Abdullah Sports City; Attendance: 14,388; Referee: Shoukri Al-Hanfoush

21 October 2016 6	Al-Nassr	1–0	Al-Ahli	Riyadh
20:15	Al-Jebreen (yellow card) 42'; Ayala 83'; Ayala (yellow card) 84'; Al-Fraidi (yellow card) 90'	Report	Al-Mosailem (yellow card) 8'; Al-Fatil (yellow card) 82'	Stadium: King Fahd International Stadium; Attendance: 16,501; Referee: Viktor Kassai (Hungary)

29 October 2016 7	Al-Ahli	4–1	Al-Khaleej	Jeddah
20:00	Al-Somah 7', 14', 70', 72'	Report	Jandson 18'	Stadium: King Abdullah Sports City; Attendance: 8,811; Referee: Mohammed Al-Hoaish

4 November 2016 8	Al-Ahli	4–0	Al-Wehda	Jeddah
20:00	Al-Somah 7'; Hawsawi (yellow card) 41'; Carlos (yellow card) 49'; Fetfatzidis 58'; Bassas 74'; Asiri 89'	Report	Al-Dossari (yellow card) 45+1'; Al-Faresi (yellow card) 61'; Al-Otaibi (yellow card) 68'; Al-Najar (yellow card) 80'	Stadium: King Abdullah Sports City; Attendance: 17,923; Referee: Fahad Al-Oraini

20 November 2016 9	Al-Batin	0–1	Al-Ahli	Hafar al-Batin
19:45	Al-Enazi (yellow card) 22'; Dakheel (yellow card) 62'; Al-Shammeri (yellow card) 90+4'	Report	Hawsawi 43', (yellow card) 73'; Ali Awagi (yellow card) 66'; Carlos (yellow card) 75'	Stadium: Al-Batin Club Stadium; Attendance: 1,644; Referee: Mishari Al-Mishari

25 November 2016 10	Al-Ahli	1–2	Al-Hilal	Jeddah
20:00	Al-Somah (yellow card) 80', (goal) 90+3'; Al-Mougahwi (yellow card) 80'; Al-Moasher (yellow card) 90'	Report	Bonatini 27'; Carlos Eduardo 59'	Stadium: King Abdullah Sports City; Attendance: 51,659; Referee: David Fernández Borbalán (Spain)

1 December 2016 11	Al-Faisaly	3–6	Al-Ahli	Al Majma'ah
19:40	Luisinho 12' (pen.), 74', (yellow card) 45'; Al-Munaif (yellow card) 16'; Fallatah (yellow card) 82'; Abbas (yellow card) 84'; Everaldo 88'; Abdulaziz (yellow card) 90+1'	Report	Al-Somah 6'; Abdel-Shafy (yellow card) 12'; Al-Fatil 17'; Alemão 31' (o.g.); Al-Moasher 58', (yellow card) 67'; Fetfatzidis 61'; Al-Jassim 75'	Stadium: King Salman Sport City Stadium; Attendance: 704; Referee: Khaled Al-Teris

9 December 2016 12	Al-Ahli	1–0	Al-Raed	Jeddah
19:55	Balghaith (yellow card) 50'; Asiri 81'	Report	Al-Sherif (yellow card) 35'; Al-Showaish (yellow card) 58'; Al-Qahtani (yellow card) 60'; Sharahili (yellow card) 71'; Al-Bishi (yellow card) 89'	Stadium: King Abdullah Sports City; Attendance: 11,689; Referee: Fahad Al-Mirdasi

17 December 2016 13	Al-Taawoun	2–3	Al-Ahli	Buraidah
19:45	Machado 14'; El Hamdaoui 70' (pen.); Sari Amr (yellow card) 87'	Report	Al-Somah 9' (pen.); Asiri (yellow card) 15', (goal) 67'; Al-Moasher (yellow card) 38'; Kurdi (yellow card) 71'; Al-Dossari 80' (o.g.)	Stadium: King Abdullah Sport City Stadium; Attendance: 2,774; Referee: Abdulrahman Al-Sultan

22 December 2016 14	Al-Ahli	4–1	Al-Ettifaq	Jeddah
19:45	Awagi (yellow card) 6', (goal) 60'; Aman 20'; Al-Somah 24', 66'	Report	Al-Hazaa 23'; Otain (yellow card) 31'; Kanno (yellow card) 72'; Al-Nashi (yellow card) 80'	Stadium: King Abdullah Sports City; Attendance: 14,743; Referee: Aleksei Kulbakov (Belarus)

31 December 2016 15	Al-Ahli	2–0	Al-Fateh	Jeddah
19:50	Kurdi (yellow card) 45+1'; Awagi 84', 90+3'	Report		Stadium: King Abdullah Sports City; Attendance: 9,560; Referee: Sultan Al-Harbi

27 January 2017 16	Al-Ahli	3–1	Al-Shabab	Jeddah
20:15	Al-Somah 23', 47', (yellow card) 31'; Al-Moasher (yellow card) 58'; Asiri 85'	Report	Benyettou 19'; Al-Sulayhem (yellow card) 71'	Stadium: King Abdullah Sports City; Attendance: 40,591; Referee: Jonas Eriksson (Sweden)

3 February 2017 17	Al-Ittihad	1–4	Al-Ahli	Jeddah
20:20	Fallatah 2'; Al-Nakhli (yellow card) 6'; Al-Muwallad (yellow card) 42'; Khrees (yellow card) 50'; Al-Ansari (yellow card) 78'	Report	Al-Moasher (yellow card) 6'; Fetfatzidis 41', (yellow card) 59'; Assiri 48'; Al-Jassim (yellow card) 52'; Asiri 62'; Al-Mowalad 87'	Stadium: King Abdullah Sports City; Attendance: 52,909; Referee: Kevin Blom (Netherlands)

9 February 2017 18	Al-Qadisiyah	4–1	Al-Ahli	Khobar
20:15	Fallatah 40', 45+3'; Jaafari (yellow card) 41'; Bismark 53'; Hazazi 76', (yellow card) 81'	Report	Al-Mowalad (yellow card) 45+2'; Al-Harbi (yellow card) 49'; Al-Somah (yellow card) 69', (goal) 88'; Assiri (yellow card) 89'	Stadium: Prince Saud bin Jalawi Stadium; Attendance: 5,002; Referee: Szymon Marciniak (Poland)

17 February 2017 19	Al-Ahli	0–2	Al-Nassr	Jeddah
20:25	Al-Fatil (yellow card) 46'; Al-Robeai (yellow card) 51'; Abdul-Amir (red card) 72'; Al-Mowalad (yellow card) 78'	Report	Al-Fraidi (yellow card) 5'; Al-Ghamdi (yellow card) 42'; Al-Shehri 45+1'; Ghaleb (yellow card) 53'; Al-Dossari (yellow card) 66'; Hazazi 90+3' (pen.)	Stadium: King Abdullah Sports City; Attendance: 38,355; Referee: Artur Dias (Portugal)

4 March 2017 20	Al-Khaleej	2–2	Al-Ahli	Dammam
20:30	Jandson 4'; Hazazi (yellow card) 41'; Lajami (yellow card) 79'; Diakité 81'	Report	Al-Somah 39' (pen.); Asiri 44'	Stadium: Prince Mohamed bin Fahd Stadium; Attendance: 1,383; Referee: Khaled Salwi

9 March 2017 21	Al-Wehda	1–3	Al-Ahli	Mecca
20:35	Fallatah 33'; Belal (yellow card) 67' (yellow-red card) 80'	Report	Al-Somah 9', 27', (yellow card) 64'; Al-Jassim 38'; Al-Harbi (yellow card) 81'	Stadium: King Abdul Aziz Stadium; Attendance: 2,338; Referee: Svein Oddvar Moen (Norway)

7 April 2017 22	Al-Ahli	1–1	Al-Batin	Jeddah
20:40	Fetfatzidis (yellow card) 37'; Al-Fatil (yellow card) 41'; Al-Moasher 59'	Report	Al-Eisa (yellow card) 52'; Jhonnattann 78'; Freeh (yellow card) 89'	Stadium: King Abdullah Sports City; Attendance: 6,219; Referee: Stefan Johannesson (Sweden)

15 April 2017 23	Al-Hilal	0–0	Al-Ahli	Riyadh
20:45	Al-Breik (yellow card) 19'	Report	Asiri (yellow card) 16'	Stadium: King Fahd International Stadium; Attendance: 12,348; Referee: Cüneyt Çakır (Turkey)

20 April 2017 24	Al-Ahli	2–1	Al-Faisaly	Jeddah
20:45	Balghaith 51'; Assiri 72'	Report	Luisinho 42'	Stadium: King Abdullah Sports City; Attendance: 3,040; Referee: Abdulrahman Al-Sultan

30 April 2017 25	Al-Raed	1–3	Al-Ahli	Buraidah
20:50	Bangoura 22' (pen.); Al-Qahtani (yellow card) 69'; Al-Habib (yellow card) 74'	Report	Al-Somah 18', 67' (pen.); Abdul-Amir 57'; Bakshween (yellow card) 73'	Stadium: King Abdullah Sport City Stadium; Attendance: 10,025; Referee: Sultan Al-Harbi

4 May 2017 26	Al-Ahli	2–1	Al-Taawoun	Jeddah
20:50	Assiri 20', 59'; Bakshween (yellow card) 63'; Al-Mowalad (yellow card) 90+5'	Report	Kanno (yellow card) 34'; Al-Shameri (yellow card) 35'; Al-Hussain 89'; Al-Dossari (yellow card) 90+1'	Stadium: King Abdullah Sports City; Attendance: 2,241; Referee: Mohammed Al-Hoaish

=== King Cup ===
Al-Ahli entered the King Cup in the Round of 32 alongside the other Pro League teams.

20 January 2017 Round of 32	Al-Ahli	2–1	Al-Shoulla	Jeddah
20:10 AST	Al-Moasher 15'; Al-Mowalad (yellow card) 87'; Al-Mogahwi 90+5'	Report	Al-Dossari 50'; Al-Balawi (yellow card) 81'; Al-Sobeai (yellow card) 90+3'	Stadium: King Abdullah Sports City; Referee: Sami Al-Jires

13 February 2017 Round of 16	Al-Qadisiyah	1–3	Al-Ahli	Khobar
20:15	Bismark 22'; Al-Johani (yellow card) 88'; Barnawi (yellow card) 90'	Report	Al-Mogahwi 19'; Al-Somah 37'; Abdul-Amir 42' (pen.); Al-Harbi (yellow card) 59'	Stadium: Prince Saud bin Jalawi Stadium; Referee: Khaled Al-Teris

2 April 2017 Quarter-finals	Al-Ahli	6–0	Wej	Jeddah
20:30	Al-Somah 28', 49'; Abdul-Amir 35'; Al-Jassim (yellow card) 41'; Al-Moasher 59'; Al-Mogahwi 69'; Fetfatzidis 71'; Bakshween (yellow card) 80'	Report	Al-Mowallad (yellow card) 45+2'; Barnawi (yellow card) 68'; Al-Shaeri (yellow card) 83'	Stadium: King Abdullah Sports City; Attendance: 20,177; Referee: Khaled Al-Teris

12 May 2017 Semi-finals	Al-Faisaly	0–3	Al-Ahli	Al Majma'ah
20:50		Report	Fetfatzidis 55'; Seraj 75', 81'; Balghaith (yellow card) 79'	Stadium: King Salman Sport City Stadium; Referee: Shoukri Al-Hanfoush

18 May 2017 Final	Al-Ahli	2–3	Al-Hilal	Jeddah
21:00	Hawsawi 43'; Al-Somah 90+3' (pen.)	Report	Kharbin 28'; Jahfali 77'; Carlos Eduardo 88'	Stadium: King Abdullah Sports City; Attendance: 54,563; Referee: Artur Soares Dias (Portugal)

=== Crown Prince Cup ===
As one of last year's finalists, Al-Ahli received a bye to the second round of the Crown Prince Cup. Al-Ahli started off their campaign by beating Al-Faisaly 2-1 at home, Al-Ahli came from behind and scored twice from the penalty spot through Omar Al Somah.

Al-Ahli were drawn away at Hajer for the quarter-finals. The game was played on 25 October 2016. The Royals won 6-1 with Omar Al-Somah scoring a hat-trick.

For the semi-finals Al-Ahli were drawn away at local rivals Al-Ittihad. The game was played on 27 December 2016. Al-Ahli lost 3-2 and were eliminated from the competition.

27 September 2016 Round of 16	Al-Ahli	2–1	Al-Faisaly	Jeddah
20:15 AST	Al-Robeai (yellow card) 37'; Al-Somah 66' (pen.), 83' (pen.); Kurdi (yellow card) 90'; Al-Moasher (yellow card) 90+1'; Al-Harbi (yellow card) 90+4'		Abbas (yellow card) 21'; Salem (yellow card) 23'; Alemão 50', (yellow card) 68'; Hamzi (yellow card) 64'; Al-Sowayed (yellow card) 82'; Abdulaziz (yellow card) 90+1'	Stadium: King Abdullah Sports City; Referee: Turki Al-Khudhayr

25 October 2016 Quarter-finals	Hajer	1–6	Al-Ahli	Al-Hasa
17:45 AST	Al-Nufaili (yellow card) 42'; Al-Radhi (yellow card) 52'; Soumah 73'		Al-Otaibi 18' (o.g.); Al-Somah 23', 36', 39'; Hawsawi 53' (pen.); Assiri 69'	Stadium: Prince Abdullah bin Jalawi Stadium; Attendance: 1,459; Referee: Mohammed Al-Nuhait

27 December 2016 Semi-finals	Al-Ittihad	3–2	Al-Ahli	Jeddah
19:50	Akaïchi 28'; Kahraba 38'; Bajandouh (yellow card) 62'; Al-Muwallad (yellow card) 82', (goal) 90'; Al-Nakhli (yellow card) 84'	Report	Bakhshween (yellow card) 44'; Al-Somah 72', 77' (pen.); Hamad (yellow card) 81'; Balghaith (yellow card) 89'	Stadium: King Abdullah Sports City; Attendance: 47,223; Referee: Mohammed Al Hoaish

=== AFC Champions League ===
As league winners, Al-Ahli entered the AFC Champions League at the group stage. The draw took place on 13 December 2016 and saw Al-Ahli paired with Hazfi Cup winners Zob Ahan, UAE Pro League and 2016 AFC Champions League runners-up Al Ain, and Uzbek League runners-up Bunyodkor.

==== Group stage ====
Pos	Team	Pld	W	D	L	GF	GA	GD	Pts	Qualification	AIN	AHL	ZOB	BUN
1	(United Arab Emirates) Al-Ain	6	3	3	0	14	7	+7	12	Advance to knockout stage	—	2–2	1–1	3–0
2	(Saudi Arabia) Al-Ahli	6	3	2	1	10	7	+3	11	Advance to knockout stage	2–2	—	2–0	2–0
3	(Iran) Zob Ahan	6	2	1	3	6	9	−3	7		0–3	1–2	—	2–1
4	(Uzbekistan) Bunyodkor	6	1	0	5	5	12	−7	3		2–3	2–0	0–2	—

Source: AFC
Rules for classification: Group stage tiebreakers

21 February 2017 1	Al-Ahli (Saudi Arabia)	2–0	(Uzbekistan) Bunyodkor	Jeddah, Saudi Arabia
20:15 UTC+3	Al-Somah 13'; Al-Moasher 53'; Bassas (yellow card) 83'	Report	Dilshodbek (yellow card) 67'; Ibrokhimov (yellow card) 90+2'	Stadium: King Abdullah Sports City; Attendance: 11,315; Referee: Ryuji Sato (Japan)

28 February 2017 2	Zob Ahan (Iran)	1–2	(Saudi Arabia) Al-Ahli	Muscat, Oman
19:15 UTC+4	Rajabzadeh 45+2' (pen.)	Report	Asiri 29'; Al-Mowalad (yellow card) 33'; Hawsawi (red card) 45+1'; Al-Somah 86'	Stadium: Sultan Qaboos Sports Complex; Attendance: 7,000; Referee: Ko Hyung-jin (South Korea)

13 March 2017 3	Al-Ahli (Saudi Arabia)	2–2	(United Arab Emirates) Al-Ain	Jeddah, Saudi Arabia
20:30 UTC+3	Balghaith 26', (yellow card) 78'; Fetfatzidis 50'	Report	Ali (yellow card) 9'; Al-Shamrani 28'; Balghaith 52' (o.g.); Ismail (yellow card) 71'	Stadium: King Abdullah Sports City; Attendance: 23,431; Referee: Adham Makhadmeh (Jordan)

11 April 2017 4	Al-Ain (United Arab Emirates)	2–2	(Saudi Arabia) Al-Ahli	Al Ain, United Arab Emirates
19:35 UTC+4	Ismail 7'; O. Abdulrahman 85' (pen.)	Report	Al-Somah 43', 89', (yellow card) 84'; Abdul-Amir (yellow card) 66'	Stadium: Hazza Bin Zayed Stadium; Attendance: 9,224; Referee: Ali Sabah (Iraq)

24 April 2017 5	Bunyodkor (Uzbekistan)	2–0	(Saudi Arabia) Al-Ahli	Tashkent, Uzbekistan
19:00 UTC+5	Komilov 8'; Shomurodov 54'; Kosimov (yellow card) 62'; Axmadaliev (yellow card) 68'	Report		Stadium: Bunyodkor Stadium; Attendance: 1,307; Referee: Fu Ming (China)

8 May 2017 6	Al-Ahli (Saudi Arabia)	2–0	(Iran) Zob Ahan	Doha, Qatar
18:40 3:00	Asiri 63'; Kurdi 84'; Balghaith (yellow card) 90+1'	Report	Rajabzadeh (yellow card) 43'	Stadium: Thani bin Jassim Stadium; Attendance: 260; Referee: Ryuji Sato (Japan)

==== Knockout phase ====
===== Round of 16 =====
22 May 2017 First leg	Al-Ahli (Saudi Arabia)	1–1	(United Arab Emirates) Al-Ahli	Jeddah, Saudi Arabia
20:45 UTC+3	Asiri 38'; Al-Shamrani (yellow card) 82'; Bakshween (yellow card) 90+1'	Report	Esmaeel 21'; Al Hammadi (yellow card) 82'; Al Fardan (yellow card) 89'	Stadium: King Abdullah Sports City; Attendance: 17,323; Referee: Ali Sabah (Iraq)

29 May 2017 Second leg	Al-Ahli (United Arab Emirates)	1–3 (2–4 agg.)	(Saudi Arabia) Al-Ahli	Dubai, United Arab Emirates
23:00 UTC+4	Diop (yellow card) 33' (yellow-red card) 59'; Haikal (yellow card) 38'; Al Hammadi (yellow card) 41'; Naser (yellow card) 70'; Esmaeel (yellow card) 78'; Gyan 90+1' (pen.)	Report	Al-Jassim 18'; Al-Mogahwi 24'; Al-Fatil (yellow card) 45+4'; Abdul-Amir (yellow card) 70', (goal) 72' (pen.)	Stadium: Al-Rashid Stadium; Attendance: 3,993; Referee: Chris Beath (Australia)

== Statistics ==
=== Appearances ===
No.	Pos.	Name	Pro League		King Cup		Crown Prince Cup		Champions League		Super Cup		Total		Discipline	
No.	Pos.	Name	Apps	Goals	Apps	Goals	Apps	Goals	Apps	Goals	Apps	Goals	Apps	Goals	Yellow card	Red card
1	GK	(Saudi Arabia) Yasser Al Mosailem	16	0	5	0	1	0	8	0	1	0	31	0	1	0
2	DF	(Saudi Arabia) Ali Al-Zubaidi	4 (1)	0	0	0	1	0	0	0	0	0	5 (1)	0	0	0
4	MF	(Saudi Arabia) Waleed Bakshween	4	0	3 (1)	0	1	0	3	0	0	0	11 (1)	0	5	0
5	MF	(Saudi Arabia) Fahad Hamad	3 (1)	0	0	0	1	0	0	0	0	0	4 (1)	0	0	0
6	DF	(Saudi Arabia) Mohammed Al Fatil	20 (1)	1	3 (1)	0	2	0	3 (1)	0	1	0	29 (3)	1	3	0
7	MF	(Saudi Arabia) Salman Al-Moasher	23 (2)	2	5	2	1 (2)	0	8	1	1	0	38 (4)	5	5	0
8	MF	(Saudi Arabia) Taisir Al-Jassim	23	3	5	0	2	0	8	1	1	0	39	4	2	0
9	FW	(Syria) Omar Al Soma	24	24	3 (1)	4	3	7	5	4	1	1	36 (1)	40	5	0
10	MF	(Greece) Giannis Fetfatzidis	19 (6)	3	4 (1)	2	2	0	8	1	1	0	34 (7)	6	2	0
11	MF	(Saudi Arabia) Housain Al-Mogahwi	11 (12)	0	2 (2)	3	2	0	2 (6)	1	0 (1)	0	17 (21)	4	1	0
13	DF	(Egypt) Mohamed Abdel-Shafy	17 (2)	0	3	0	1	0	8	0	1	0	30 (2)	0	1	0
14	FW	(Saudi Arabia) Muhannad Assiri	2 (12)	4	0	0	0 (1)	1	1 (4)	0	0	0	3 (17)	5	1	0
16	MF	(Saudi Arabia) Maher Othman	0	0	0	0	0	0	0	0	0	0	0	0	0	0
20	FW	(Saudi Arabia) Islam Seraj	0 (3)	0	0 (2)	2	1	0	0	0	0	0	1 (5)	2	0	0
21	DF	(Saudi Arabia) Ageel Balghaith	20	1	3	0	2 (1)	0	3	1	1	0	29 (1)	2	5	0
22	GK	(Saudi Arabia) Ahmed Al-Rehaili	10 (1)	0	0	0	2	0	0	0	0	0	12 (1)	0	0	0
23	DF	(Saudi Arabia) Saeed Al-Mowalad	10	1	5	0	0	0	8	0	0	0	23	1	5	0
24	MF	(Saudi Arabia) Ali Awagi	2 (8)	3	0	0	1 (2)	0	0	0	1	0	4 (10)	3	2	0
25	DF	(Saudi Arabia) Motaz Hawsawi	16 (1)	2	2	1	1	1	6	0	1	0	26 (1)	4	2	1
26	DF	(Saudi Arabia) Mohammed Aman	2 (4)	1	0	0	2	0	0 (1)	0	0 (1)	0	4 (6)	1	1	0
27	MF	(Saudi Arabia) Hamdan Al-Shamrani	0	0	0	0	0	0	0 (2)	0	0	0	0 (2)	0	1	0
30	DF	(Saudi Arabia) Saeed Al-Robeai	1 (1)	0	1	0	1 (1)	0	1	0	0	0	4 (2)	0	2	0
31	DF	(Saudi Arabia) Mansoor Al-Harbi	9 (5)	0	2 (1)	0	2	0	0 (2)	0	0	0	13 (8)	0	4	0
44	GK	(Saudi Arabia) Ayman Al-Hussaini	0	0	0	0	0	0	0	0	0	0	0	0	0	0
45	MF	(Saudi Arabia) Abdulfattah Asiri	13 (7)	6	5	0	2	0	8	3	0	0	28 (7)	9	2	0
47	MF	(Saudi Arabia) Mustafa Bassas	10 (2)	2	0 (1)	0	1	0	0 (1)	0	0 (1)	0	11 (5)	2	2	0
55	MF	(Iraq) Saad Abdul-Amir	10	1	4 (1)	2	0	0	8	1	0	0	22 (1)	4	1	1
66	GK	(Saudi Arabia) Basem Atallah	0	0	0	0	0	0	0	0	0	0	0	0	0	0
77	DF	(Saudi Arabia) Amiri Kurdi	4 (5)	0	0 (2)	0	1	0	0 (3)	1	0	0	5 (10)	1	3	0
Players who left the club in August/January transfer window or on loan
18	MF	(Brazil) Luíz Carlos	12 (1)	0	0	0	1	0	0	0	1	0	14 (1)	0	2	0
40	MF	(Saudi Arabia) Raed Al-Ghamdi	0 (1)	0	0	0	0	0	0	0	0	0	0 (1)	0	0	0
80	MF	(Saudi Arabia) Ryan Al-Mousa	0 (1)	0	0	0	0	0	0	0	0	0	0 (1)	0	0	0

Last updated: 29 May 2017.

=== Goalscorers ===
Rank	No.	Pos	Nat	Name	Pro League	King Cup	Crown Prince Cup	Champions League	Super Cup	Total
1	9	FW	(Syria)	Omar Al Somah	24	4	7	4	1	40
2	45	MF	(Saudi Arabia)	Abdulfattah Asiri	6	0	0	3	0	9
3	10	MF	(Greece)	Giannis Fetfatzidis	3	2	0	1	0	6
4	7	MF	(Saudi Arabia)	Salman Al-Moasher	2	2	0	1	0	5
4	14	FW	(Saudi Arabia)	Muhannad Assiri	4	0	1	0	0	5
6	8	MF	(Saudi Arabia)	Taisir Al-Jassim	3	0	0	1	0	4
6	11	MF	(Saudi Arabia)	Housain Al-Mogahwi	0	3	0	1	0	4
6	25	DF	(Saudi Arabia)	Motaz Hawsawi	2	1	1	0	0	4
6	55	MF	(Iraq)	Saad Abdul-Amir	1	2	0	1	0	4
10	24	MF	(Saudi Arabia)	Ali Awagi	3	0	0	0	0	3
11	20	FW	(Saudi Arabia)	Islam Seraj	0	2	0	0	0	2
11	21	DF	(Saudi Arabia)	Ageel Balghaith	1	0	0	1	0	2
11	47	MF	(Saudi Arabia)	Mustafa Al-Bassas	2	0	0	0	0	2
14	6	DF	(Saudi Arabia)	Mohammed Al-Fatil	1	0	0	0	0	1
14	23	DF	(Saudi Arabia)	Saeed Al-Mowalad	1	0	0	0	0	1
14	26	DF	(Saudi Arabia)	Mohammed Aman	1	0	0	0	0	1
14	77	DF	(Saudi Arabia)	Amiri Kurdi	0	0	0	1	0	1
Own goal					3	0	1	0	0	4
Total					57	16	10	14	1	98

Last Updated: 29 May 2017

=== Clean sheets ===
Rank	No.	Pos	Nat	Name	Pro League	King Cup	Crown Prince Cup	Champions League	Super Cup	Total
1	1	GK	(Saudi Arabia)	Yasser Al Mosailem	3	2	0	2	0	7
2	22	GK	(Saudi Arabia)	Ahmed Al-Rehaili	4	0	0	0	0	4
Total					7	2	0	2	0	11

Last Updated: 12 May 2017
