= Muhannad Assiri =

Saudi Arabian footballer

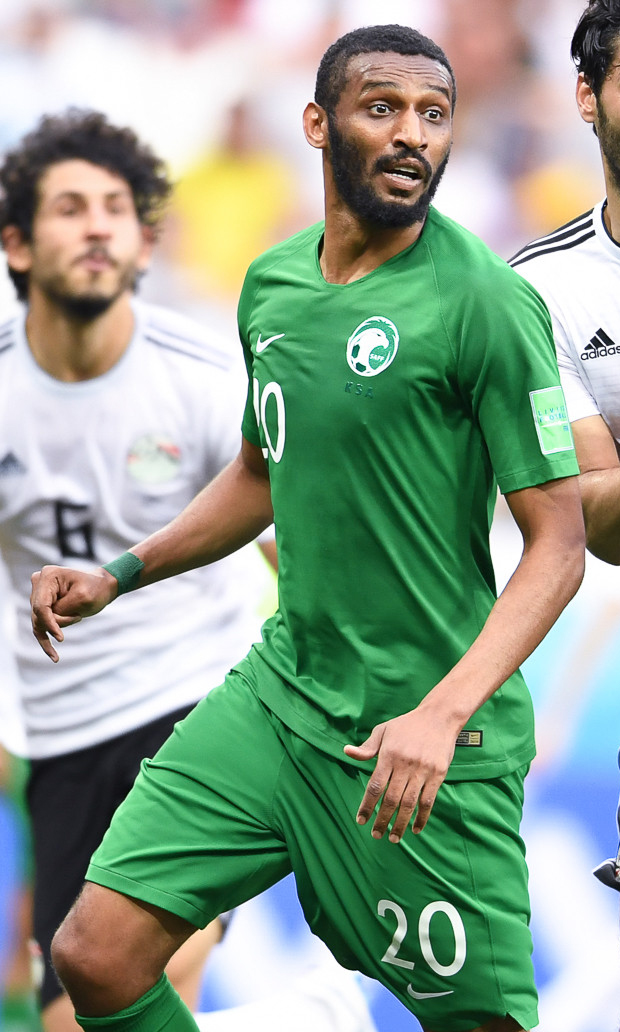
- Assiri with Saudi Arabia at 2018

Personal information
- Full name: Muhannad Ahmed Abu Radeah Assiri
- Date of birth: 14 October 1986 (age 40)
- Place of birth: Muhayil, Saudi Arabia
- Height: 1.87 m (6 ft 2 in)
- Position: Forward

Youth career
- Al-Shaheed

Senior career*
Years	Team	Apps	(Gls)
2008–2013	Al-Wehda	76	(36)
2013–2014	Al-Shabab	25	(7)
2014–2021	Al-Ahli	71	(29)
2021	Al-Shabab	0	(0)

International career^{‡}
2010–2018	Saudi Arabia	18	(4)
- * Club domestic league appearances and goals as of 2 September 2018 (UTC) ‡ National team caps and goals as of 23:38, 25 June 2018 (UTC)

Muhannad Ahmed Abu Radeah Assiri (Arabic: مهند أحمد أبو رديه عسيري; born 14 October 1986) is a retired Saudi Arabian professional footballer who plays as a forward.

== Club Career ==
=== Al-Wehda ===
Muhannad Assiri began his professional football career with Al-Wehda, where he established himself as one of the club's key attacking players. During his time at the club, Assiri gained attention for his pace, movement, and goal-scoring ability. He played an important role for Al-Wehda in the Saudi Pro League before leaving the club in 2013.

=== Al-Shabab ===
In 2013, Assiri joined Al-Shabab. During the 2014 King's Cup, he played a key role in the club's success and scored two goals in the final against Al-Ahli in the 33rd and 50th minutes, helping Al-Shabab secure a 3–0 victory and win the title.

=== Al-Ahli ===
In 2014, Assiri transferred to Al-Ahli. He became part of one of the club's most successful periods, helping the team secure its first domestic double in the 2015–16 season by winning the Saudi Pro League and the King Cup. He was also part of the squad that won the Saudi Super Cup in 2016, completing a domestic treble across the period.

=== retirement ===
On 7 August 2021, Assiri announced his retirement from football.

== International Career ==
In May 2018, he was named in Saudi Arabia’s preliminary squad for the 2018 FIFA World Cup in Russia.

== Career statistics ==
=== Club ===
As of 31 May 2021

Club	Season	League			King Cup		Crown Prince Cup (Note: Discontinued in 19 September 2017)		Asia		Other		Total	
Club	Season	Division	Apps	Goals	Apps	Goals	Apps	Goals	Apps	Goals	Apps	Goals	Apps	Goals
Al-Wehda	2008–09	Pro League	6	0	0	0	0	0	—		—		6	0
Al-Wehda	2009–10	Pro League	18	9	2	0	1	0	—		—		21	9
Al-Wehda	2010–11	Pro League	19	14	3	0	4	1	—		—		26	15
Al-Wehda	2011–12	First Division	21	8	—		1	0	—		—		22	8
Al-Wehda	2012–13	Pro League	12	5	—		2	0	—		—		14	5
Al-Wehda	Al-Wehda Total		76	36	5	0	8	1	0	0	0	0	89	37
Al-Shabab	2012–13	Pro League	5	2	5	4	0	0	4	1	—		14	7
Al-Shabab	2013–14	Pro League	20	5	3	3	2	1	4	0	—		29	9
Al-Shabab	Al-Shabab Total		25	7	8	7	2	1	8	1	0	0	43	16
Al-Ahli	2014–15	Pro League	10	8	2	0	3	0	4	1	—		19	9
Al-Ahli	2015–16	Pro League	13	4	3	2	2	0	3	2	—		21	8
Al-Ahli	2016–17	Pro League	14	4	0	0	1	1	6	0	0	0	21	5
Al-Ahli	2017–18	Pro League	15	8	2	0	—		7	5	—		24	13
Al-Ahli	2018–19	Pro League	13	4	0	0	—		2	0	4 (Note: Appearances in Arab Club Champions Cup)	0	19	4
Al-Ahli	2019–20	Pro League	2	0	0	0	—		0	0	—		2	0
Al-Ahli	2020–21	Pro League	4	1	1	0	—		1	0	—		6	1
Al-Ahli	Al-Ahli Total		71	29	8	2	6	1	23	8	4	0	112	40
Career total			172	72	21	9	16	3	31	9	4	0	244	93

=== International ===
Statistics accurate as of match played 25 June 2018.

Saudi Arabia
Year	Apps	Goals
2010	8	3
2011	2	0
2012	1	0
2013	0	0
2014	0	0
2015	0	0
2016	1	0
2017	2	0
2018	4	1
Total	18	4

Scores and results list Saudi Arabia's goal tally first.

No	Date	Venue	Opponent	Score	Result	Competition
1.	9 October 2010	Prince Abdullah Al Faisal Stadium, Jeddah, Saudi Arabia	Uzbekistan	2–0	4–0	Friendly
2.	9 October 2010	Prince Abdullah Al Faisal Stadium, Jeddah, Saudi Arabia	Uzbekistan	3–0	4–0	Friendly
3.	22 November 2010	22 May Stadium, Aden, Yemen	Yemen	3–0	4–0	20th Arabian Gulf Cup
4.	26 February 2018	King Abdullah Sports City, Jeddah, Saudi Arabia	Moldova	3–0	3–0	Friendly

== Honours ==
Al-Shabab

- King Cup: 2014

Al-Ahli

- Saudi Crown Prince Cup: 2014–15
- Saudi Professional League: 2015–16
- King Cup: 2016
- Saudi Super Cup: 2016
