= Salman Al-Moasher =

Saudi Arabian footballer

Personal information
- Full name: Salman Mohammed Al-Moasher
- Date of birth: 5 October 1988 (age 38)
- Place of birth: Mecca, Saudi Arabia
- Height: 1.73 m (5 ft 8 in)
- Position: Winger

Youth career
- –2005: Heraa
- 2005–2007: Al Hilal

Senior career*
Years	Team	Apps	(Gls)
2007–2011	Al Hilal	5	(2)
2010	→ Al-Qadsiah	0	(0)
2011–2014	Al-Wehda	86	(29)
2014–2023	Al-Ahli	190	(22)
2023–2024	Al-Tai	18	(0)
2024–2025	Al-Jubail	29	(1)
2025–2026	Al-Wehda	22	(3)

International career^{‡}
2012–2018	Saudi Arabia	24	(2)
- * Club domestic league appearances and goals as of 21:12, 12 July 2023 (UTC) ‡ National team caps and goals as of 23:29, 27 March 2018 (UTC)

Salman Al-Moasher (Arabic: سلمان المؤشر; born 5 October 1988) is a Saudi Arabian footballer who plays a winger. He is a former Saudi Arabia international having represented them from 2012 until 2018.

== Career ==
Salman Al-Moasher started his career at Heraa in his hometown of Mecca. In 2005, he received offers from Al-Ahli, Al-Nassr and Al-Shabab. He also received an offer from Khaled Al-Hubaish, the head of youth development at Al Hilal at the time, to join Al-Hilal's youth team. Al-Moasher eventually agreed to Al-Hilal's offer and officially joined their youth team.

Al-Moasher made his first-team debut for Al-Hilal on 7 January 2008 in the league match against Al-Wehda. He scored the only goal of the game in the 45th minute. On 12 January 2008, Al-Moasher scored his second goal for the club as Al-Hilal defeated Al-Wehda 3–1 at home. Despite scoring twice, Al-Moasher was unable to break into the first team and made just 4 appearances throughout all competitions in the 2007–08 season. On 15 December 2008, Al-Moasher made his final appearance for the club in the 2–0 away win against Al-Raed.

In January 2010, Al-Moasher joined Al-Qadsiah on loan until the end of the season. However, he failed to make a single appearance for the club and returned to Al-Hilal following the conclusion of the season.

On 20 January 2011, Al-Moasher joined Al-Wehda on a three-and-a-half-year contract. He made his debut for the club on 12 February 2011 in the league match against former club Al-Hilal. He scored twice and assisted five times in 18 matches throughout all competitions as Al-Wehda finished as runners-up in the Crown Prince Cup. Despite his best efforts, Al-Wehda were relegated at the end of the season after they were docked three points. In his second season at the club, Al-Moasher scored 14 league goals helping Al-Wehda finish second in the First Division thus earning promotion to the Pro League.

In the 2012–13 season, Al-Moasher scored once and assisted three times in 21 league matches. However, Al-Wehda finished 14th and were relegated at the end of the season. Following Al-Wehda's relegation to the First Division, Al-Moahser was linked to moves to Al-Ittihad and Al-Nassr. However, a move wasn't materialized and Al-Moasher remained at Al-Wehda. In his fourth and final season at the club, Al-Moasher scored 11 goals in 28 appearances and finished as the club's top scorer. However, Al-Wehda finished third and failed to gain promotion to the Pro League. Al-Moasher refused to sign a new contract with the club and left following the conclusion of the season.

On 13 May 2014, Al-Moasher joined Al-Ahli on a free transfer. He signed a three-year contract with the club. He made his debut for the club on 22 September 2014 in the Crown Prince Cup match against Hajer. He made his league debut on 27 September 2014 against Al-Shoulla. Al-Moasher scored his first goal for Al-Ahli in the 4–2 away win against Al-Raed on 25 October 2014.

In the final league match of the season, Al-Moasher scored the equalizer against derby rivals Al-Ittihad. This meant that Al-Ahli would end their season unbeaten. However, despite ending the league unbeaten, Al-Ahli finished in second place. In his second season at the club, Al-Moasher played a vital role in helping Al-Ahli win the domestic double. On 11 September 2023, Al-Moahser joined Al-Tai on a one-year deal following the expiration of his contract with Al-Ahli.

== Career statistics ==
=== Club ===
As of 27 May 2024.

Club	Season	League			King Cup		Crown Prince Cup (Note: Discontinued in September 19, 2017)		Asia		Other		Total	
Club	Season	Division	Apps	Goals	Apps	Goals	Apps	Goals	Apps	Goals	Apps	Goals	Apps	Goals
Al-Hilal	2007–08	Premier League	3	2	0	0	1	0	–	–	–	–	4	2
Al-Hilal	2008–09	Premier League	2	0	0	0	0	0	0	0	–	–	2	0
Al-Hilal	2009–10	Premier League	0	0	0	0	0	0	0	0	–	–	0	0
Al-Hilal	Al-Hilal Total		5	2	0	0	1	0	0	0	0	0	6	2
Al-Qadsiah	2009–10	Pro League	0	0	–	–	0	0	–	–	–	–	0	0
Al-Wehda	2010–11	Pro League	10	1	5	1	3	0	–	–	–	–	18	2
Al-Wehda	2011–12	First Division	27	16	–	–	0	0	–	–	–	–	27	16
Al-Wehda	2012–13	Pro League	21	1	–	–	2	0	–	–	–	–	23	1
Al-Wehda	2013–14	First Division	28	11	0	0	0	0	–	–	–	–	28	11
Al-Wehda	Al-Wehda Total		86	29	5	1	5	0	0	0	0	0	96	30
Al-Ahli	2014–15	Pro League	18	4	2	1	2	0	8	0	–	–	30	5
Al-Ahli	2015–16	Pro League	24	1	5	0	4	0	3	0	–	–	36	1
Al-Ahli	2016–17	Pro League	25	2	5	2	3	0	9	1	1 (Note: Appearances in Saudi Super Cup)	0	43	5
Al-Ahli	2017–18	Pro League	13	4	2	3	–	–	6	0	–	–	21	7
Al-Ahli	2018–19	Pro League	22	3	3	0	–	–	7	0	8 (Note: Appearances in Arab Club Champions Cup)	1	40	4
Al-Ahli	2019–20	Pro League	22	2	5	1	–	–	7	2	–	–	22	4
Al-Ahli	2020–21	Pro League	29	5	1	0	–	–	6	0	–	–	36	5
Al-Ahli	2021–22	Pro League	17	0	0	0	–	–	0	0	–	–	17	0
Al-Ahli	2022–23	SFDL	20	1	0	0	–	–	0	0	–	–	20	1
Al-Ahli	Al-Ahli Total		190	22	23	7	9	0	46	3	9	1	267	33
Al-Tai	2023–24	Pro League	18	0	0	0	–	–	–	–	–	–	18	0
Career Total			299	53	28	8	15	0	46	3	9	1	397	65

=== International ===
Statistics accurate as of match played 10 September 2019.

Saudi Arabia
Year	Apps	Goals
2012	1	0
2013	0	0
2014	0	0
2015	5	0
2016	4	0
2017	11	2
2018	3	0
Total	24	2

=== International goals ===
Scores and results list Saudi Arabia's goal tally first.

No	Date	Venue	Opponent	Score	Result	Competition
1.	23 March 2017	Rajamangala Stadium, Bangkok, Thailand	Thailand	3–0	3–0	2018 FIFA World Cup qualification
2.	22 December 2017	Jaber International Stadium, Kuwait City, Kuwait	Kuwait	1–0	2–1	23rd Arabian Gulf Cup

== Honours ==
Al-Hilal

- Pro League: 2007–08
- Crown Prince Cup: 2007–08, 2008–09

Al-Ahli

- Pro League: 2015–16
- First Division: 2022–23
- King Cup: 2016
- Crown Prince Cup: 2014–15
- Saudi Super Cup: 2016
