= Housain Al-Mogahwi =

Saudi Arabian footballer

Personal information
- Full name: Housain Ali Jassim Al-Mogahwi
- Date of birth: 24 March 1988 (age 38)
- Place of birth: Al-Hasa, Saudi Arabia
- Height: 1.74 m (5 ft 9 in)
- Position: Midfielder

Youth career
- Al-Adalah

Senior career*
Years	Team	Apps	(Gls)
2006–2010	Al-Adalah		
2010–2014	Al-Fateh	98	(11)
2014–2022	Al-Ahli	161	(19)
2022–2023	Al-Fateh	11	(0)
2023–2024	Al-Adalah	9	(0)
2024–2025	Al-Ula	8	(5)

International career^{‡}
2012–2019	Saudi Arabia	31	(2)
- * Club domestic league appearances and goals as of 18:24, 20 January 2022 (UTC) ‡ National team caps and goals as of 20:04, 17 November 2020 (UTC)

Housain Ali Al-Mogahwi (Arabic: حسين المقهوي, born 24 March 1988) is a Saudi Arabian professional footballer who plays as a midfielder. He is a former Saudi Arabia international.

== Club career ==
He joined Al Fateh in 2010. Impressive performances made him a regular starter in the Saudi club.

On 9 September 2023, Al-Mogahwi joined Al-Adalah, 13 years after departing the club.

On 6 February 2024, Al-Mogahwi joined Saudi Third Division side Al-Ula.

== International career ==
He made his debut for Saudi Arabia against Iran in a 0–0 draw.

In May 2018 he was named in Saudi Arabia's preliminary squad for the 2018 FIFA World Cup in Russia.

== Career statistics ==
=== Club ===
As of match played 30 June 2022

Club	Season	League		King Cup		Crown Prince Cup		Asia		Other		Total	
Club	Season	Apps	Goals	Apps	Goals	Apps	Goals	Apps	Goals	Apps	Goals	Apps	Goals
Al-Fateh	2010–11	23	2	—		1	0	—		—		24	2
Al-Fateh	2011–12	26	5	5	1	1	0	—		—		32	6
Al-Fateh	2012–13	23	4	5	0	2	0	—		—		30	4
Al-Fateh	2013–14	26	0	1	0	4	1	5	0	1 (Note: Appearances in Saudi Super Cup)	0	37	1
Al-Fateh	Total	98	11	11	1	8	1	5	0	1	0	123	13
Al-Ahli	2014–15	24	2	1	0	5	0	9	1	—		39	3
Al-Ahli	2015–16	23	5	4	0	2	0	4	0	—		33	5
Al-Ahli	2016–17	23	0	4	3	2	0	10	1	1	0	40	4
Al-Ahli	2017–18	24	5	3	1	—		6	0	—		33	6
Al-Ahli	2018–19	17	3	0	0	—		4	0	7 (Note: Appearances in Arab Club Champions Cup)	0	28	3
Al-Ahli	2019–20	15	2	4	1	—		6	0	—		25	3
Al-Ahli	2020–21	18	2	0	0	—		6	0	—		24	2
Al-Ahli	2021–22	17	0	1	0	—		—		—		18	0
Al-Ahli	Total	161	19	17	5	9	0	45	2	8	0	240	26
Career totals		259	30	28	6	17	1	50	2	9	0	363	39

=== International ===
Statistics accurate as of match played 17 November 2020.

Saudi Arabia
Year	Apps	Goals
2012	3	0
2013	1	0
2014	0	0
2015	3	0
2016	2	1
2017	3	0
2018	14	0
2019	4	1
2020	1	0
Total	31	2

=== International goals ===
As of 12 January 2019

Score and Result list Saudi Arabia's goal tally first

International goals
#	Date	Venue	Opponent	Score	Result	Competition
1.	24 August 2016	Grand Hamad Stadium, Doha, Qatar	Laos	4–0	4–0	Friendly
2.	12 January 2019	Al-Maktoum Stadium, Dubai, United Arab Emirates	Lebanon	2–0	2–0	2019 AFC Asian Cup

== Honours ==
Al-Fateh

- Saudi Pro League: 2012–13
- Saudi Super Cup: 2013

Al-Ahli

- Saudi Pro League: 2015–16
- King Cup: 2016
- Crown Prince Cup: 2014–15
- Saudi Super Cup: 2016

Al-Ula

- Saudi Third Division: 2023–24
