= Mustafa Bassas =

Saudi professional footballer

Personal information
- Full name: Mustafa Mahdi Bassas
- Date of birth: June 2, 1993 (age 33)
- Place of birth: Jeddah, Saudi Arabia
- Height: 1.72 m (5 ft 7 1/2 in)

Youth career
- 2005–2012: Al-Ahli

Senior career*
Years	Team	Apps	(Gls)
2012–2020	Al-Ahli	89	(18)
2018	→ Ohod (loan)	6	(0)
2020–2021	Al-Faisaly	11	(0)

International career^{‡}
2011–2015	Saudi Arabia U-23	6	(0)
2012–2015	Saudi Arabia	15	(0)
- * Club domestic league appearances and goals as of 18:50, 9 March 2018 (UTC) ‡ National team caps and goals as of 23:15, 22 March 2017 (UTC)

Mustafa Mahdi Bassas (Arabic: مصطفى مهدي بصاص; born 25 June 1993) is a Saudi professional footballer who last played for Pro League club Al-Faisaly as a winger.

== Club career ==
=== Early years ===
Mustafa began and spent all of his career to date with Al-Ahli. He played for the Al-Ahli academy junior and youth teams. Bassas plays in more than one position: right back, central midfielder, attacking midfielder, winger, and second striker. He is known for his pace, shot power, and leadership skills. Czech coach Karel Jarolím gave him his debut in the Al-Ahli first team.

=== 2012–present ===
On 7 October 2012, he played his first game with the senior team against Najran club in 2012–13 Saudi Professional League.

In the 2012 AFC Champions League, Bassas played in his first rivalry match in Jeddah against Ittihad, proving to be best player on the pitch, showing a lot of skill and talent when on the ball even though his side lost the first leg 1-0. The second leg, however, was won by Al-Ahli 2-0, with Bassas producing a man of the match display with an assist to Victor Simões, who also scored the second goal in the 83rd minute and to help the team qualify for the final against eventual winners Ulsan Hyundai. Al-Bassas helped Al-Ahli in obtaining Saudi Federation Cup 2012-13. Al-Ahli fans chose Al-Bassas as Player of the Season in 2012-13.

Al-Bassas has played 10 matches and scored 4 goals in the 2013 AFC Champions League. His 4 goals were against Al-Gharafa, He scored twice against Sepahan and once against El-Jaish. Al-Bassas has played 19 matches in the 2012–13 Saudi Professional League this season and scored 5 goals.

== International career ==
Bassas made his debut in the Saudi Arabia national team against Argentina and the result was a draw.

== Sponsorship ==
In 2013, Al-Bassas is featured, alongside Lionel Messi, on the official cover of the video game FIFA 14 as distributed for the Middle East for all platforms except the Wii and Nintendo 3DS versions. He did not appear on the PlayStation 4 and Xbox One versions of the game either, although those versions featured a revised cover.

== Career statistics ==
=== Club ===
As of 30 May 2021

Club	Season	League			King Cup		Crown Prince Cup (Note: Discontinued in September 19, 2017)		Asia		Other		Total	
Club	Season	Division	Apps	Goals	Apps	Goals	Apps	Goals	Apps	Goals	Apps	Goals	Apps	Goals
Al-Ahli	2011–12	Pro League	0	0	0	0	0	0	3	0	–	–	3	0
Al-Ahli	2012–13	Pro League	19	5	4	1	1	0	7	4	–	–	31	10
Al-Ahli	2013–14	Pro League	22	4	5	1	3	2	–	–	–	–	30	7
Al-Ahli	2014–15	Pro League	20	5	2	0	4	0	7	1	–	–	33	6
Al-Ahli	2015–16	Pro League	15	2	2	0	2	0	3	0	–	–	22	2
Al-Ahli	2016–17	Pro League	12	2	1	0	1	0	1	0	1 (Note: Appearance in Super Cup)	0	15	2
Al-Ahli	2017–18	Pro League	0	0	0	0	–	–	0	0	–	–	0	0
Al-Ahli	2018–19	Pro League	0	0	0	0	–	–	0	0	0	0	0	0
Al-Ahli	2019–20	Pro League	1	0	0	0	–	–	0	0	–	–	1	0
Al-Ahli	Al-Ahli Total		89	18	14	2	11	2	21	5	1	0	136	27
Ohod (loan)	2017–18	Pro League	6	0	0	0	–	–	–	–	–	–	6	0
Al-Faisaly	2019–20	Pro League	7	0	0	0	–	–	–	–	–	–	7	0
Al-Faisaly	2020–21	Pro League	4	0	0	0	–	–	–	–	–	–	4	0
Al-Faisaly	Al-Faisaly Total		11	0	0	0	0	0	0	0	0	0	11	0
Career Total			106	18	14	2	11	2	21	5	1	0	155	27

=== International ===
Statistics accurate as of match played 10 September 2019.

Saudi Arabia
Year	Apps	Goals
2012	1	0
2013	5	0
2014	8	0
2015	1	0
Total	15	0

== Honours ==
=== Club ===
Al-Ahli

- Saudi Professional League: 2015–16
- King Cup : 2016
- Saudi Crown Prince Cup : 2014–15
- Saudi Super Cup: 2016
- Saudi Federation Cup: 2012–13
- AFC Champions League Runner-up: 2012

Al-Faisaly

- King Cup : 2020–21

=== International ===
Saudi Arabia U-23

- GCC U-23 Championship: 2012

=== Individual ===
- GCC U-23 Championship most valuable player: 2012
- Al-Ahli player of the season: 2012–13
