= Aqeel Baalghyth =

Saudi Arabian footballer

Personal information
- Full name: Aqeel Baalghyth Mohammed Al-Sahbi
- Date of birth: 15 March 1987 (age 39)
- Place of birth: Jeddah, Saudi Arabia
- Height: 1.81 m (5 ft 11 1/2 in)
- Positions: Centre back; right back

Team information
- Current team: Al-Ain
- Number: 21

Youth career
- Al Rabea

Senior career*
Years	Team	Apps	(Gls)
2007–2012	Al-Faisaly		(5)
2012–2018	Al-Ahli	95	(3)
2018–2020	Al-Faisaly	30	(0)
2020–2022	Al-Raed	35	(2)
2022–2024	Jeddah	44	(4)
2024–2025	Al-Ula	21	(0)
2025–	Al-Ain		

International career
2012	Saudi Arabia	3	(0)
- * Club domestic league appearances and goals as of 22:50, 12 April 2018 (UTC)

Aqeel Baalghyth Al-Sahbi (Arabic: عقيل بلغيث الصحبي; born 15 March 1987) is a Saudi professional footballer who plays as a defender for Al-Ain He is a former Saudi Arabia international.

== Career ==
On 3 August 2018, Baalghyth joined Al-Faisaly on a two-year deal.

On 15 January 2020, Baalghyth joined Al-Raed. He joined the club following the conclusion of the 2019–20 season.

On 24 August 2022, Baalghyth returned to Jeddah 15 years after leaving the club.

On 2 October 2025, Baalghyth joined Al-Ain.

== Honours ==
Al-Faisaly

- Saudi First Division: 2009–10

Al-Ahli

- Saudi Professional League: 2015–16
- King Cup of Champions: 2012, 2016
- Saudi Crown Prince Cup: 2014–15
- Saudi Super Cup: 2016

Al-Ula

- Saudi Third Division: 2023–24
