= Mohammed Aman (footballer) =

Saudi Arabian footballer

Personal information
- Full name: Mohammed Aman Al-Jahdali
- Date of birth: 8 September 1988 (age 38)
- Place of birth: Jeddah, Saudi Arabia
- Height: 1.84 m (6 ft 1/2 in)
- Position: Defender

Youth career
- Al Rabea

Senior career*
Years	Team	Apps	(Gls)
2008–2009	Al Rabea		
2009–2017	Al-Ahli	45	(2)
2010–2011	→ Al-Qadsiah (loan)	20	(0)
2011–2012	→ Al-Taawoun (loan)	19	(2)
2017–2018	Al-Fateh	10	(1)
2023	Al-Entesar		
2024	Al-Nahda		
- * Club domestic league appearances and goals as of 18:50, 22 December 2016 (UTC)

Mohammed Aman Al-Jahdali (Arabic: محمد أمان الجحدلي; born 8 September 1988) is a Saudi Arabian professional footballer who plays as a defender.

== Honours ==
Al-Ahli

- Saudi Professional League: 2015–16
- King Cup: 2016
- Crown Prince Cup: 2014–15
- Saudi Super Cup: 2016
