= Mansoor Al-Harbi =

Saudi Arabian footballer

Personal information
- Full name: Mansoor Ateeq Al-Sobhi Al-Harbi
- Date of birth: 19 October 1987 (age 39)
- Place of birth: Jeddah, Saudi Arabia
- Height: 1.73 m (5 ft 8 in)
- Position: Left back

Youth career
- 2004–2007: Al-Ahli

Senior career*
Years	Team	Apps	(Gls)
2007–2018	Al-Ahli	181	(7)
2018–2020	Al-Ittihad	46	(1)
2021–2022	Al-Raed	25	(1)

International career^{‡}
2006–2018	Saudi Arabia	40	(1)
- * Club domestic league appearances and goals as of 16:01, 31 January 2021 (UTC) ‡ National team caps and goals as of 22:00, 8 June 2018 (UTC)

Mansoor Ateeq Al-Sobhi Al-Harbi (Arabic: منصور عتيق الصبحي الحربي; born 19 October 1987) is a Saudi Arabian former professional footballer who plays as a defender.

== Club career ==
Mansoor Al-Harbi played left back for Al-Ahli from 2004 until 2018. He helped Al-Ahli win multiple titles including the 2015–16 Saudi Professional League and the 2016 King Cup.

Mansoor joined Al-Ittihad on 26 July 2018 with 3 years contract

== International career ==
=== 2012 Arab Nations Cup ===
Mansoor made his debut for the Saudi Arabia national football team in the 2012 Arab Nations Cup, helping the side reach the semi-finals where they suffered a 2–0 defeat to Libya. Also Saudi Arabia lost to Iraq by Third place.

=== 2013 Gulf Cup of Nations ===
Al-Harbi began the Gulf Cup 2013, where in the group stage they lost the first match against Iraq 0-2. In the next match against Yemen, they won 2-0, and he was named man of the match.

==== 2018 World Cup ====
In June 2018 he was named in Saudi Arabia’s squad for the 2018 World Cup in Russia.

== Career statistics ==
=== Club ===
As of match played 7 May 2022

Appearances and goals by club, season and competition
Club	Season	League			Cup		Crown Prince Cup		Asia		Other		Total	
Club	Season	Division	Apps	Goals	Apps	Goals	Apps	Goals	Apps	Goals	Apps	Goals	Apps	Goals
Al-Ahli	2007–08	Saudi Pro League	7	0	1	0	0	0	1	0	—		9	0
Al-Ahli	2008–09	Saudi Pro League	15	0	1	0	1	0	—		—		17	0
Al-Ahli	2009–10	Saudi Pro League	19	0	2	0	4	0	4	0	—		29	0
Al-Ahli	2010–11	Saudi Pro League	17	0	5	0	2	0	—		—		24	0
Al-Ahli	2011–12	Saudi Pro League	25	1	5	1	3	0	10	0	—		43	2
Al-Ahli	2012–13	Saudi Pro League	24	1	5	1	1	1	9	0	—		39	3
Al-Ahli	2013–14	Saudi Pro League	25	2	6	1	2	0	—		—		33	3
Al-Ahli	2014–15	Saudi Pro League	5	0	0	0	1	0	0	0	—		6	0
Al-Ahli	2015–16	Saudi Pro League	8	2	3	2	1	0	4	0	—		16	4
Al-Ahli	2016–17	Saudi Pro League	14	0	3	0	2	0	2	0	0	0	21	0
Al-Ahli	2017–18	Saudi Pro League	22	1	1	0	—		7	0	—		30	1
Al-Ahli	total		181	7	32	5	18	1	37	0	0	0	268	13
Al-Ittihad	2018–19	Saudi Pro League	24	1	3	1	—		4	0	2 (Note: Appearances in Arab Club Champions Cup)	0	33	2
Al-Ittihad	2019–20	Saudi Pro League	22	0	2	0	—		—		4	0	28	0
Al-Ittihad	Total		46	1	5	1	—		4	0	6	0	61	2
Al-Raed	2020–21	Saudi Pro League	7	1	0	0	—		—		—		7	1
Al-Raed	2021–22	Saudi Pro League	18	0	0	0	—		—		—		18	0
Al-Raed	Total		25	1	0	0	—		—		—		25	2
Career total			252	9	37	6	18	1	41	0	6	0	354	16

=== International ===
Statistics accurate as of match played 14 June 2018.

Saudi Arabia
Year	Apps	Goals
2009	2	0
2010	2	0
2011	0	0
2012	5	1
2013	9	0
2014	3	0
2015	0	0
2016	5	0
2017	8	0
2018	6	0
Total	40	1

=== International goals ===
#	Date	Venue	Opponent	Score	Result	Competition
1	14 October 2012	Prince Abdullah bin Jalawi Stadium, Saudi Arabia	Congo	3–2	3–2	Friendly match

== Honours ==
=== Club ===
Al-Ahli

- Kings Cup: 2011, 2012, 2016.
- Saudi Crown Prince Cup: 2014–15
- Saudi Professional League: 2015–16
- Saudi Super Cup: 2016
- GCC Champions League: 2008

=== Individual ===
- Gulf Cup 2013 Man Of The Match vs. Yemen.
