= Yasser Al-Mosailem =

Saudi Arabian footballer (born 1984)

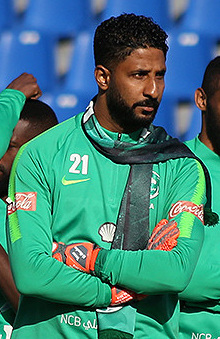
- Al-Mosailem with Saudi Arabia in 2018

Personal information
- Full name: Yasser Abdullah Nasser Al-Mosailem
- Date of birth: 27 February 1984 (age 42)
- Place of birth: Al-Ahsa, Saudi Arabia
- Height: 1.86 m (6 ft 1 in)

Team information
- Current team: Jeddah
- Number: 1

Youth career
- 1999–2002: Hajer
- 2002–2005: Al-Ahli

Senior career*
Years	Team	Apps	(Gls)
2005–2023	Al-Ahli	209	(0)
2024–	Jeddah	0	(0)

International career^{‡}
2006–2018	Saudi Arabia	33	(0)
- * Club domestic league appearances and goals as of 31 September 2022 ‡ National team caps and goals as of 17:20, 25 June 2018 (UTC)

Yasser Abdullah Nasser Al-Mosailem (Arabic: ياسر عبد الله ناصر المسيليم; born 27 February 1984) is a Saudi Arabian professional footballer who plays as a goalkeeper for Saudi First Division League club Jeddah. He spent 18 years representing Al-Ahli and the Saudi Arabia national team.

== Club career ==
Born in Al-Hasa, Al-Mosailem started his career in the youth setups of local club Hajer. On 11 November 2002, Al-Mosailem joined Al-Ahli for a reported fee of SAR200,000. Al-Mosailem was the third player to join Al-Ahli from Hajer following the transfers of brothers Misfer and Taisir Al-Jassim a couple of months earlier. He made his first-team debut in the Federation Cup group stage match against Ohod, which ended in a 3–1 win. Al-Mosailem made his league debut on 22 October 2005 in the 3–0 win against Al-Hazem. He ended his first full season at the club making 21 appearances across all competitions.

In his second season with Al-Ahli, Al-Mosailem was a starter in all 5 matches in the Crown Prince Cup as Al-Ahli won the cup. He also played a role in the Federation Cup. He went on to make 33 appearances in all competitions. He remained as a starter for Al-Ahli until 2012, where he was dropped in favor of Abdullah Al-Mayouf. He made just 24 appearances in 3 seasons for Al-Ahli. On 20 May 2014, Al-Mosailem renewed his contract with the club. On 14 February 2015, in the Crown Prince Cup final, Al-Mosailem came off the bench to save a penalty following Al-Mayouf's dismissal. Al-Ahli went on to win the match and Al-Mosailem won his second Crown Prince Cup. Al-Mosailem eventually regained his starting spot and played a vital role in Al-Ahli's first league title in 32 years. On 23 October 2016, Al-Mosailem was injured in the league match against Al-Nassr and was ruled out for four weeks. On 29 December 2016, Al-Mosailem renewed his contract with Al-Ahli keeping him at the club until 2020. On 15 September 2023, Al-Mosailem announced his departure from Al-Ahli as well as his retirement from football.

On 10 August 2024, Al-Mosailem joined Saudi First Division League club Jeddah, a year after announcing his retirement.

== International career ==
Young Al Ahli goalkeeper Yasser Al-Mosailem was handed his chance in the national set-up with veterans Mabrouk Zaid and Mohammad Khouja being absent. The 23-year-old custodian produced a string of impressive displays for Al Ahli to earn his place in Helio Anjos' side after helping the Saudi Premier League side to two domestic trophies, and he played the first time on Saudi Arabia national team in 2007 AFC Asian Cup, where Yasser had an outstanding performance, helping the Saudis to reach the final. However, subsequent injuries forced him to be excluded from the national team in major competitions like 2011 and 2015 AFC Asian Cups, and losing the position to Waleed Abdullah.

In May 2018 he was named in Saudi Arabia's squad for the 2018 FIFA World Cup in Russia.

== Personal life ==
Yasser is married and has a son Amar and a daughter Elaph. Yasser has stated that he likes to spend most his time on social media such as Instagram and Snapchat.He is a member of Shia Muslim minority of Saudi Arabia.

== Career statistics ==
=== Club ===
As of 12 July 2023.

Appearances and goals by club, season and competition
Club	Season	League		King Cup		Crown Prince Cup (Note: Discontinued on 19 September 2017)		Continental		Other		Total	
Club	Season	Apps	Goals	Apps	Goals	Apps	Goals	Apps	Goals	Apps	Goals	Apps	Goals
Al-Ahli	2004–05	0	0	—		0	0	0	0	5 (Note: Appearances in Federation Cup)	0	5	0
Al-Ahli	2005–06	16	0	—		5	0	—		0	0	21	0
Al-Ahli	2006–07	17	0	—		5	0	—		14 (Note: 12 appearances in Arab Club Champions Cup and two in the Federation Cup)	0	36	0
Al-Ahli	2007–08	20	0	1	0	3	0	4	0	—		28	0
Al-Ahli	2008–09	14	0	0	0	0	0	—		5 (Note: Appearances in GCC Champions League)	0	19	0
Al-Ahli	2009–10	9	0	2	0	0	0	4	0	4	0	19	0
Al-Ahli	2010–11	21	0	5	0	2	0	—		—		28	0
Al-Ahli	2011–12	26	0	0	0	1	0	2	0	—		29	0
Al-Ahli	2012–13	12	0	5	0	0	0	3	0	—		20	0
Al-Ahli	2013–14	1	0	0	0	0	0	—		—		1	0
Al-Ahli	2014–15	1	0	1	0	1	0	0	0	—		3	0
Al-Ahli	2015–16	22	0	3	0	4	0	2	0	—		31	0
Al-Ahli	2016–17	16	0	5	0	1	0	8	0	1 (Note: Appearances in Saudi Super Cup)	0	31	0
Al-Ahli	2017–18	2	0	2	0	—		6	0	—		10	0
Al-Ahli	2018–19	4	0	3	0	—		0	0	1 (Note: Appearances in Arab Club Champions Cup)	0	8	0
Al-Ahli	2019–20	17	0	3	0	—		3	0	—		23	0
Al-Ahli	2020–21	4	0	0	0	—		0	0	—		4	0
Al-Ahli	2021–22	4	0	0	0	—		0	0	—		4	0
Al-Ahli	2022–23	3	0	0	0	—		0	0	—		3	0
Al-Ahli	Total	209	0	30	0	22	0	32	0	30	0	325	0
Career total		209	0	30	0	22	0	32	0	30	0	325	0

=== International ===
Statistics accurate as of match played 25 June 2018.

Saudi Arabia
Year	Apps	Goals
2006	3	0
2007	14	0
2008	1	0
2009	1	0
2010	0	0
2011	0	0
2012	2	0
2013	0	0
2014	0	0
2015	0	0
2016	5	0
2017	4	0
2018	3	0
Total	33	0

== Honours ==
=== Club ===
- Al-Ahli

- Saudi Professional League: 2015–16
- Saudi First Division League: 2022-23
- King Cup: 2011, 2012, 2016
- Saudi Crown Prince Cup: 2006–07, 2014–15
- Saudi Federation Cup: 2006–07
- Saudi Super Cup: 2016
- Gulf Club Champions Cup: 2008

=== International ===
- AFC Asian Cup runner-up: 2007
- Star of the season in Al-Ahli: 2017.

== See also ==
- List of one-club men in association football
