= Samer Salem =

Samer Salem may refer to:

- Samer Salem (footballer, born 1992), Saudi footballer for Al-Najma
- Samer Salem (footballer, born 1993), Syrian footballer for Hutteen
