= 2016 Saudi Super Cup =

2016 Saudi Super Cup كأس السوبر السعودي 2016
- Promotional poster for the event
Al-Ahli	Al-Hilal
Pro League King Cup	Crown Prince Cup
1	1
- Al-Ahli won 4–3 on penalties
- Date: 8 August 2016
- Venue: Craven Cottage, London, England
- Referee: Sébastien Delferière (Belgium)
- Attendance: 16,365

The 2016 Saudi Super Cup was the fourth edition of the Saudi Super Cup, an annual football match contested by the winners of the previous season's Saudi Pro League and King Cup competitions.

The match was played on 8 August 2016 between Al-Ahli, the winners of both the 2015–16 Saudi Pro League and the 2016 King Cup, and Al-Hilal, the winners of the 2015–16 Crown Prince Cup. Normally, the Saudi Super Cup is contested by the league and King Cup champions, but since Al-Ahli won both competitions, Al-Hilal qualified as Crown Prince Cup winners — the first time a team qualified this way. The match was held at Craven Cottage in London, England, marking the second consecutive edition of the Saudi Super Cup to be played abroad.

The match ended in a 1–1 draw after regular time and was decided by a penalty shoot-out, with Al-Ahli winning 4–3 to claim their first Saudi Super Cup title.

== Background ==
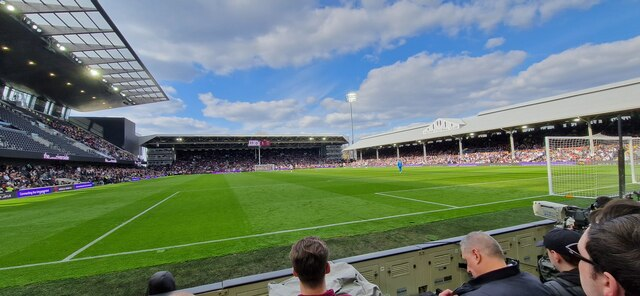
Craven Cottage in london hosted the match

Al-Ahli qualified as champions of the 2015–16 Saudi Pro League and winners of the 2016 King Cup. It was their first Saudi Super Cup appearance since the competition was introduced in 2013.

Al-Hilal qualified as winners of the 2015–16 Crown Prince Cup, having defeated Al-Ahli 2–1 in the final on 19 February 2016 to claim a record-extending 13th title. This was their second Super Cup appearance, as they were also the defending champions, having won the previous edition in 2015.

The most recent meeting between the two sides prior to the Super Cup was a 3–1 victory for Al-Ahli at King Abdullah Stadium on 24 April 2016. Al-Hilal took the lead through Carlos Eduardo in the 10th minute, but Omar Al-Somah scored twice in the second half to turn the match around, and Housain Al-Mogahwi sealed the win with a third goal in stoppage time. The result secured Al-Ahli the league title in dramatic fashion.

== Match ==
=== Details ===
8 August 2016
19:30 BST

Al-Ahli	1–1	Al-Hilal
Al-Somah 69'	Report	Al-Breik 61'
Penalties
Luíz Carlos (penalty missed); Hawsawi (penalty scored); Al-Bassas (penalty scored); Al-Mogahwi (penalty scored); Al Somah (penalty scored)	4–3	(penalty scored) Al-Qahtani; (penalty scored) Al-Shamrani; (penalty missed) Hawsawi; (penalty missed) Al-Ruwaili; (penalty scored) Al-Dawsari

Craven Cottage, London
Attendance: 16,365
Referee: Sébastien Delferière (Belgium)

Al-Ahli	Al-Hilal

GK	1	(Saudi Arabia) Yasser Al Mosailem
RB	21	(Saudi Arabia) Ageel Balghaith
CB	6	(Saudi Arabia) Mohammed Al Fatil	(substituted off) 88'
CB	25	(Saudi Arabia) Motaz Hawsawi
LB	13	(Egypt) Mohamed Abdel-Shafy
CM	18	(Brazil) Luíz Carlos
CM	8	(Saudi Arabia) Taisir Al-Jassim (c)
RW	7	(Saudi Arabia) Salman Al-Moasher
AM	10	(Greece) Giannis Fetfatzidis	(substituted off) 63'
LW	24	(Saudi Arabia) Ali Awagi	(substituted off) 75'
CF	9	(Syria) Omar Al Somah
Substitutes:
GK	66	(Saudi Arabia) Basem Atallah
DF	31	(Saudi Arabia) Mansoor Al-Harbi
DF	28	(Saudi Arabia) Mohammed Aman	(substituted on) 88'
MF	47	(Saudi Arabia) Mustafa Bassas	(substituted on) 75'
MF	11	(Saudi Arabia) Housain Al-Mogahwi	(substituted on) 63'
MF	19	(Saudi Arabia) Ryan Al-Mousa
FW	20	(Saudi Arabia) Islam Seraj
Manager:
(Portugal) José Manuel Gomes

GK	1	(Saudi Arabia) Abdullah Al-Mayouf
RB	2	(Saudi Arabia) Mohammed Al-Breik	(yellow card) 48'
CB	33	(Saudi Arabia) Osama Hawsawi
CB	70	(Saudi Arabia) Mohammed Jahfali
LB	13	(Saudi Arabia) Fahad Ghazi
RM	29	(Saudi Arabia) Salem Al-Dawsari
CM	6	(Saudi Arabia) Abdulmalek Al-Khaibri
CM	18	(Saudi Arabia) Abdulmajeed Al-Ruwaili
LM	24	(Saudi Arabia) Nawaf Al Abed		(substituted off) 90+5'
CF	10	(Saudi Arabia) Mohammad Al-Shalhoub (c)		(substituted off) 71'
CF	9	(Brazil) Léo Bonatini		(substituted off) 76'
Substitutes:
GK	22	(Saudi Arabia) Fahad Al-Thunayan
MF	19	(Saudi Arabia) Khalid Kaabi
MF	14	(Saudi Arabia) Saud Kariri
MF	8	(Saudi Arabia) Abdullah Otayf
MF	7	(Saudi Arabia) Salman Al-Faraj		(substituted on) 71'
FW	15	(Saudi Arabia) Nasser Al-Shamrani		(substituted on) 76'
FW	20	(Saudi Arabia) Yasser Al-Qahtani		(substituted on) 90+5'
Manager:
(Uruguay) Gustavo Matosas

Man of the Match: Omar Al-Somah

Assistant referees:
Yves De Neve
Kevin Monteny

Match rules

- 90 minutes. No extra time.
- Penalty shoot-out if scores level.
- Seven named substitutes, of which up to three may be used.

== See also ==
- 2016–17 Saudi Pro League
- 2016–17 Crown Prince Cup
- 2017 King Cup
