= Omar Al Somah =

Syrian footballer (born 1989)

- Al-Somah in 2025

Personal information
- Full name: Omar Al Somah
- Date of birth: 23 March 1989 (age 37)
- Place of birth: Deir Ez-Zor, Syria
- Height: 1.92 m (6 ft 4 in)
- Position: Striker

Team information
- Current team: Al-Wahda
- Number: 9

Youth career
- 2001–2008: Al-Futowa

Senior career*
Years	Team	Apps	(Gls)
2008–2011	Al-Futowa	42	(36)
2011–2014	Qadsia	57	(43)
2014–2023	Al-Ahli	180	(144)
2022–2023	→ Al-Arabi (loan)	20	(19)
2023–2025	Al-Arabi	25	(18)
2025	Al-Orobah	16	(10)
2025	→ Wydad (loan)	1	(0)
2025–2026	Al-Hazem	24	(7)
2026–	Al-Wahda	0	(0)

International career^{‡}
2007–2008	Syria U20	2	(1)
2008–2012	Syria U23	10	(5)
2012–	Syria	48	(23)
- * Club domestic league appearances and goals as of 08:57, 18 September 2026 (UTC) ‡ National team caps and goals as of 13 November 2026 (UTC)

Omar Jehad Al Somah (Arabic: عُمَر جِهَاد السُّومَة; born 23 March 1989) is a Syrian professional footballer who plays as a striker for the Syria national team. Nicknamed in Syria as Al ʿAggied (Arabic: الْعَكِيْد) which is a historical civil character in Damascus known for participating in the resistance against occupiers and for being courageous, helpful, and generous.

Al Somah started his career at local club Al-Futowa, before joining Kuwaiti side Qadsia in 2011. In July 2014, Al Somah joined Al-Ahli in the Saudi Pro League. He went on to become the league top goalscorer in 2015, 2016 and 2017. He helped Al-Ahli win the league in 2016, their first in 32 years. In 2022, he joined Qatari club Al-Arabi on loan, before making the transfer permanent the following year. In January 2025, he made his return to Saudi Arabia, signing with Al-Orobah. In June that year, he signed for Moroccan club Wydad for the FIFA Club World Cup.

== Club career ==
=== Al Futowa ===
Al Somah began his football career at the age of 12, joining the youth academy of his hometown club Al Futowa. The academy won the 2007–08 Syrian under-18 league, with Al Somah emerging as the top scorer of the season with 29 goals.

He advanced to the senior team, aged 17, in the 2008–09 season, scoring 12 goals in the league and becoming his club's top scorer, although the club was relegated to the 1st Division. In the following season, he played a crucial role in their immediate promotion. He scored five goals during the 2010–11 season until its suspension in March 2011 due to the Syrian revolution.

=== Al Qadsia ===
On 30 June 2011, Al Somah joined Al Qadsia in the Kuwaiti Premier League. In his debut season, he achieved the Kuwaiti Premier League, Emir Cup and Super Cup.

==== Trial at Nottingham Forest ====
In July 2012, Al Somah participated in three games with Nottingham Forest, scoring once in a month-long trial. His trial with Nottingham occurred during the ownership of Kuwaiti businessman Fawaz Al-Hasawi, alongside his fellow national teammate Firas Al-Khatib.

Despite coach Sean O'Driscoll's desire to keep the player, his proposed transfer collapsed due to his inability to obtain a work permit. This was due to specific conditions required in English football, including his country's FIFA ranking and the number of international matches he had played in the last two years. In the meantime, it was proposed that he could play for six months in France before joining the English club, but he refused, preferring a higher salary with Al Qadsia to support his family.

==== Return to Al Qadsia ====
Upon returning to Al Qadsia, Al Somah secured the Emir Cup, Super Cup, and Crown Prince Cup in 2013. In the 2013–14 season, he won his second league title, along with the Crown Prince Cup, Federation Cup, Super Cup, and the continental AFC Cup. He concluded his final season at the club as the league's top scorer, netting 23 goals.

=== Al Ahli ===
==== 2014–15: Debut season and Pro League's top scorer ====
In May 2014, it was announced that Al Somah would join Saudi side Al Ahli, by signing a two-year contract. On 16 August 2014, he netted a hat-trick on his league debut in a 6–1 victory over Hajer. In December that year, he extended his contract until 2018.

On 13 February 2015, he scored a goal, one minute after entering the pitch, to open the score in an eventual 2–1 victory over Al Hilal in the Saudi Crown Prince Cup final. He finished his debut season as league's top scorer with 22 goals. Later that year, on 27 May, he netted a brace in a 2–1 victory over Naft Tehran in the AFC Champions League knockout stage round of 16 second leg, yet his club were eliminated on away goals rule.

==== 2015–17: Three domestic titles and consecutive top scorer ====
Al-Somah salutes Al-Ahli in celebration

In the 2015–16 season, Al Somah scored 27 goals in the Pro League, securing his club's first title in 32 years. He also netted a brace in a 3–1 win over Al Nassr after extra time in the King Cup final. In addition, he scored a goal and decisive penalty during the shootouts victory over Al-Hilal in the Super Cup. In the 2016–17 season, he achieved his third top scorer award with 24 goals, becoming the first player to score at least 20 goals in three consecutive season.

==== 2017–22: Recurring injuries and Pro League's all-time top scorer ====
In 2017–18, he sustained an ankle injury which sidelined him for most of the season. In April 2018, he signed a new contract with the club until 2021.

During the 2018–19 season, Al Somah scored 19 goals in 24 matches for Saudi Professional League side Al Ahli. On 1 March 2019, he scored an overhead kick against Al-Ittihad in the Jeddah Derby.

On 29 November 2020, Al Somah scored a goal in a 2–1 win over Al-Faisaly, in which he managed in seven seasons to equal Nasser Al-Shamrani's record of 126 goals in eleven seasons, to be the joint all-time top scorer of the league, since the Professional League rebrand in the 2008–09 season. On 22 December, he broke the record by scoring his 127th goal in a 1–0 win over Al Fateh.

In January 2021, he extended his contract until 2024. Following the club's relegation in 2021–22, Al Somah departed with an impressive tally of 192 goals and 30 assists, including a record 144 league goals.

=== Al-Arabi ===
==== 2022–23: Loan season and Emir Cup title ====
On 9 August 2022, Al Somah joined Qatari side Al-Arabi on a one-year loan. On 12 May 2023, he scored a brace for Al-Arabi in a 3–0 win over Al Sadd in the Emir Cup final, to be their first title in the competition in over 30 years. He finished his debut season as the club's top scorer with 19 goals, three goals behind league's top scorer Michael Olunga.

==== 2023–25: Permanent transfer and club's top scorer ====
On 21 July 2023, Al Somah joined Qatari side Al-Arabi on a two-year deal. He concluded the 2023–24 season as his club's top scorer with 17 goals, ranking fourth overall.

=== Al-Orobah ===
On 12 January 2025, Al Somah returned to Saudi Arabia to join Al-Orobah for the remainder of the 2024–25 season. A month later, on 7 February, he scored his first goals for the club by netting a brace in a 4–2 win over Al Wehda. He eventually featured in 17 matches during the 2024–25 season, scoring 11 goals, but despite his efforts, his team was relegated to the Saudi First Division League.

=== Wydad ===
In June 2025, Al Somah joined Botola side Wydad, signing a short-term deal, ahead of their participation in the FIFA Club World Cup. He missed the opening match against Manchester City due to visa complications preventing his travel to the United States. On 22 June, he made his debut as a substitute in a 4–1 loss to Juventus.

=== Al-Hazem ===
On 27 August 2025, Al Somah returned to Saudi Arabia and joined Al-Hazem on a one-year deal. A month later, on 23 September, he netted his first goals by scoring a brace in a 2–1 win over Neom in the King's Cup round of 32. He departed the club after only one season, scoring nine goals in 26 matches in all competitions.

== International career ==
Al Somah played for Syria U20 during the 2008 AFC U-19 Championship, scoring his country's only goal in the tournament against Iraq. On 11 October 2012, he made his senior debut in a friendly match against Kuwait, which ended in a 1–1 draw. He was then part of the team which won the 2012 WAFF Championship.

After a five-year hiatus, he returned to the national team during the 2018 FIFA World Cup qualification, playing his first match against Qatar on 31 August 2017, followed by scoring his first goal, a stoppage-time equalizer in a 2–2 away draw against Iran, which qualified his country to the qualification's fourth round. He scored both goals against Australia in a 2–3 defeat on aggregate, in addition to hitting the post from a free kick in the stoppage time of extra time, which could have qualified his country to the inter-confederation play-offs on away goals rule. In December 2018, he was named in the Syrian squad for the 2019 AFC Asian Cup in the United Arab Emirates.

In December 2023, he announced his retirement from international football, after being excluded by coach Héctor Cúper from the squad for the 2023 AFC Asian Cup in Qatar. After a few days, he reversed his decision to retire, explaining that his initial announcement was made out of anger and frustration, and stated that he would be ready to represent Syria whenever called up for international duty. On 6 June 2024, he started his first match following his return in a 1–0 defeat against North Korea during the 2026 World Cup qualification.

== Style of play ==
Al Somah plays an attacking role, most often as a center-forward, and is known for his finishing and free kick abilities. His height, strength, jumping ability, and heading technique give him an edge in winning aerial challenges. Additionally, he scores with both feet. His playing style has earned him the nickname "the Syrian Ibrahimović".

== Personal life ==
Al Somah has been married since 2015 and has two children. In February 2019, Al Soma donated $6,000 to Al-Fotuwa, the club he started his career with.

== Career statistics ==
=== Club ===
As of 21 May 2026

Appearances and goals by club, season and competition
Club	Season	League			National cup (Note: Includes Kuwait Emir Cup, King Cup)		League cup (Note: Includes Kuwait Crown Prince Cup, Saudi Crown Prince Cup)		Continental		Other		Total	
Club	Season	Division	Apps	Goals	Apps	Goals	Apps	Goals	Apps	Goals	Apps	Goals	Apps	Goals
Al Futowa	2008–09	Syrian Premier League	18	13	0	0	–		–		–		18	13
Al Futowa	2009–10	Syrian League 1st Division	16	18	0	0	–		–		–		16	18
Al Futowa	2010–11	Syrian Premier League	8	5	0	0	–		–		–		8	5
Al Futowa	Total		42	36	0	0	–		–		–		42	36
Al Qadsia	2011–12	Kuwait Premier League	13	7	2	1	6	4	7 (Note: Appearances in AFC Cup)	4	4 (Note: Appearances in Kuwait Federation Cup)	1	32	17
Al Qadsia	2012–13	Kuwait Premier League	18	13	5	3	4	1	9	2	10 (Note: Nine appearances and thirteen goals in Kuwait Federation Cup, one appearance in Kuwait Super Cup)	13	46	32
Al Qadsia	2013–14	Kuwait Premier League	26	23	3	0	5	3	9 (Note: Three appearances and one goal in AFC Champions League, six appearances and seven goals in AFC Cup)	8	1 (Note: Appearance in Kuwait Super Cup)	0	44	34
Al Qadsia	Total		57	43	10	4	15	8	25	14	15	14	122	83
Al-Ahli	2014–15	Saudi Pro League	22	22	0	0	4	3	7 (Note: Appearances in AFC Champions League)	6	–		33	31
Al-Ahli	2015–16	Saudi Pro League	22	27	3	4	3	2	3	1	–		31	34
Al-Ahli	2016–17	Saudi Pro League	24	24	4	4	3	7	7	5	1 (Note: Appearance in Saudi Super Cup)	1	39	41
Al-Ahli	2017–18	Saudi Pro League	14	11	1	0	–		0	0	–		15	11
Al-Ahli	2018–19	Saudi Pro League	24	19	1	0	–		8	7	6 (Note: Appearances in Arab Club Champions Cup)	2	39	28
Al-Ahli	2019–20	Saudi Pro League	25	19	3	3	–		4	1	–		32	23
Al-Ahli	2020–21	Saudi Pro League	24	12	0	0	–		5	4	–		29	16
Al-Ahli	2021–22	Saudi Pro League	25	10	2	1	–		–		–		27	11
Al-Ahli	Total		180	144	14	12	10	12	34	24	7	3	245	195
Al-Arabi	2022–23	Qatar Stars League	20	19	4	6	2	2	–		1 (Note: Appearance in Qatar Cup)	0	27	27
Al-Arabi	2023–24	Qatar Stars League	22	17	2	0	2	2	1	0	–		27	19
Al-Arabi	2024–25	Qatar Stars League	3	1	2	0	0	0	0	0	–		5	1
Al-Arabi	Total		45	37	8	6	4	4	1	0	1	0	59	47
Al-Orobah	2024–25	Saudi Pro League	16	10	–		–		–		–		16	10
Al-Orobah	Total		16	10	0	0	0	0	0	0	0	0	16	10
Wydad	2024–25	Botola Pro	–		–		–		–		2 (Note: Appearances in FIFA Club World Cup)	0	2	0
Wydad	Total		0	0	0	0	0	0	0	0	2	0	2	0
Al-Hazem	2025–26	Saudi Pro League	24	7	2	2	–		–		–		26	9
Career total			364	277	34	24	29	24	60	38	25	17	512	380

=== International ===
As of match played 4 September 2025

Appearances and goals by national team and year
National team	Year	Apps	Goals
Syria	2012	4	0
Syria	2017	6	3
Syria	2018	7	4
Syria	2019	9	8
Syria	2021	4	2
Syria	2022	4	1
Syria	2023	6	3
Syria	2024	2	0
Syria	2025	3	2
Total		45	23

Scores and results list Syria's goal tally first.

List of international goals scored by Omar Al Somah
No.	Date	Venue	Opponent	Score	Result	Competition
1	5 September 2017	Azadi Stadium, Tehran, Iran	Iran	2–2	2–2	2018 FIFA World Cup qualification
2	5 October 2017	Hang Jebat Stadium, Krubong, Malaysia	Australia	1–1	1–1	2018 FIFA World Cup qualification
3	10 October 2017	Stadium Australia, Sydney, Australia	Australia	1–0	1–2 (a.e.t.)	2018 FIFA World Cup qualification
4	24 March 2018	Basra Sports City, Basra, Iraq	Qatar	1–0	2–2	2018 International Friendship Championship
5	6 September 2018	Milliy Stadium, Tashkent, Uzbekistan	Uzbekistan	1–1	1–1	Friendly
6	10 September 2018	Dolen Omurzakov Stadium, Bishkek, Kyrgyzstan	Kyrgyzstan	1–1	1–2	Friendly
7	11 October 2018	Bahrain National Stadium, Rifaa, Bahrain	Bahrain	1–0	1–0	Friendly
8	15 January 2019	Khalifa bin Zayed Stadium, Al Ain, United Arab Emirates	Australia	2–2	2–3	2019 AFC Asian Cup
9	5 September 2019	Panaad Stadium, Bacolod, Philippines	Philippines	1–1	5–2	2022 FIFA World Cup qualification
10	5 September 2019	Panaad Stadium, Bacolod, Philippines	Philippines	4–1	5–2	2022 FIFA World Cup qualification
11	10 October 2019	Rashid Stadium, Dubai, United Arab Emirates	Maldives	1–0	2–1	2022 FIFA World Cup qualification
12	10 October 2019	Rashid Stadium, Dubai, United Arab Emirates	Maldives	2–0	2–1	2022 FIFA World Cup qualification
13	15 October 2019	Rashid Stadium, Dubai, United Arab Emirates	Guam	1–0	4–0	2022 FIFA World Cup qualification
14	15 October 2019	Rashid Stadium, Dubai, United Arab Emirates	Guam	2–0	4–0	2022 FIFA World Cup qualification
15	15 October 2019	Rashid Stadium, Dubai, United Arab Emirates	Guam	3–0	4–0	2022 FIFA World Cup qualification
16	12 October 2021	King Abdullah II Stadium, Amman, Jordan	Lebanon	2–3	2–3	2022 FIFA World Cup qualification
17	11 November 2021	Thani bin Jassim Stadium, Doha, Qatar	Iraq	1–0	1–1	2022 FIFA World Cup qualification
18	1 June 2022	Shabab Al Ahli Stadium, Dubai, United Arab Emirates	Tajikistan	1–0	1–0	Friendly
19	25 March 2023	Maktoum bin Rashid Al Maktoum Stadium, Dubai, United Arab Emirates	Thailand	1–0	3–1	Friendly
20	17 October 2023	Police Officers' Club Stadium, Dubai, United Arab Emirates	Kuwait	1–0	1–2	Friendly
21	16 November 2023	Prince Abdullah Al Faisal Stadium, Jeddah, Saudi Arabia	North Korea	1–0	1–0	2026 FIFA World Cup qualification
22	25 March 2025	Prince Abdullah bin Jalawi Stadium, Hofuf, Saudi Arabia	Pakistan	2–0	2–0	2027 AFC Asian Cup qualification
23	10 June 2025	Prince Abdullah bin Jalawi Stadium, Hofuf, Saudi Arabia	Afghanistan	1–0	1–0	2027 AFC Asian Cup qualification

== Honours ==
Al-Futowa

- Syrian Premier Division U-18 League: 2007–08
- Syrian Second Division Northern Group: 2009–10

Qadsia

- Kuwaiti Premier League: 2011–12, 2013–14
- Kuwait Emir Cup: 2012, 2013
- Kuwait Crown Prince Cup: 2013, 2014
- Kuwait Federation Cup: 2013–14
- Kuwait Super Cup: 2011, 2013, 2014
- AFC Cup: 2014

Al-Ahli

- Saudi Pro League: 2015–16
- King's Cup: 2016
- Crown Prince's Cup: 2014–15
- Saudi Super Cup: 2016

Al-Arabi

- Emir of Qatar Cup: 2023

Syria

- WAFF Championship: 2012

Individual

- IFFHS AFC Men's Team of the Decade 2011–2020
- Saudi Pro League Player of the Month: October 2014, October 2015, November 2020
- Syrian Premiere Division U-18 League top scorer: 2007–08 (29 goals)
- Kuwaiti Premier League top scorer: 2013–14 (23 goals)
- Saudi Pro League Golden Boot: 2014–15, 2015–16, 2016–17
- GCC Golden Boot: 2014–15, 2015–16
