= Motaz Hawsawi =

Saudi Arabian footballer

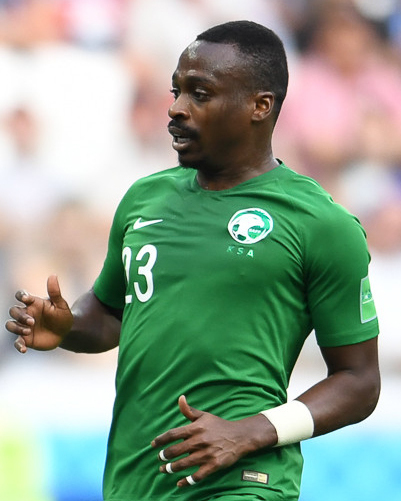
- Hawsawi at with Saudi Arabia the 2018 FIFA World Cup

Personal information
- Full name: Motaz Hassan Ali Hawsawi
- Date of birth: 17 February 1992 (age 34)
- Place of birth: Jeddah, Saudi Arabia
- Height: 1.80 m (5 ft 11 in)
- Position: Defender

Senior career*
Years	Team	Apps	(Gls)
2014–2022	Al-Ahli	118	(6)
2022–2023	Al-Taawoun	6	(0)
2023–2024	Ohod	0	(0)

International career^{‡}
2011	Saudi Arabia U-20	7	(0)
2012–2018	Saudi Arabia	19	(0)
- * Club domestic league appearances and goals as of 21:38, 16 October 2022 (UTC) ‡ National team caps and goals as of 17:22, 10 September 2018 (UTC)

Motaz Hassan Ali Hawsawi (Arabic: معتز حسن علي هوساوي; born 17 February 1992) is a Saudi Arabian former professional footballer who played as a defender. He represented the Saudi Arabia national team from 2012 until 2018.

In May 2018 he was named in Saudi Arabia's preliminary squad for the 2018 FIFA World Cup in Russia.

== Career ==
He started playing for Al-Ahli and was often described as one of the best defenders in the history of the club.

On 11 January 2022, he joined Al-Taawoun on a free transfer.

On 12 September 2023, Hawsawi joined Saudi First Division League side Ohod on a one-year deal.

== Career statistics ==
=== Club ===
As of match played 30 May 2021

Appearances and goals by club, season and competition
Club	Season	League			King Cup		Crown Prince Cup		Asia		Other		Total	
Club	Season	Divisioin	Apps	Goals	Apps	Goals	Apps	Goals	Apps	Goals	Apps	Goals	Apps	Goals
Al-Ahli	2014–15	Saudi Pro League	22	0	1	0	5	2	5	0	—		33	2
Al-Ahli	2015–16	Saudi Pro League	21	0	3	1	4	1	2	1	—		30	3
Al-Ahli	2016–17	Saudi Pro League	17	2	2	1	1	1	8	0	1 (Note: Appearances in Saudi Super Cup)	0	29	4
Al-Ahli	2017–18	Saudi Pro League	23	3	1	0	—		7	0	—		31	3
Al-Ahli	2018–19	Saudi Pro League	1	0	0	0	—		0	0	0	0	1	0
Al-Ahli	2019–20	Saudi Pro League	8	0	0	0	—		6	0	—		14	0
Al-Ahli	2020–21	Saudi Pro League	23	1	0	0	—		6	0	—		29	1
Al-Ahli	2021–22	Saudi Pro League	3	0	1	0	—		—		—		4	0
Al-Ahli	Total		118	6	8	2	10	4	34	1	1	0	171	13
Al Taawoun	2021–22	Saudi Pro League	5	0	0	0	—		4	0	—		9	0
Al Taawoun	2022–23	Saudi Pro League	1	0	0	0	—		—		—		1	0
Al Taawoun	Total		6	0	0	0	—		4	0	—		10	0
Ohod	2023–24	Saudi First Division	0	0	0	0	—		—		—		0	0
Career total			124	6	8	2	10	4	38	1	1	0	181	13

=== International ===
Statistics accurate as of match played 25 June 2018.

Saudi Arabia
Year	Apps	Goals
2012	1	0
2013	0	0
2014	4	0
2015	1	0
2016	3	0
2017	4	0
2018	6	0
Total	19	0

== Honours ==
=== Al Ahli ===
- Saudi Crown Prince Cup : 2014–15
- Saudi Professional League : 2015-16
- King Cup : 2016
- Saudi Super Cup : 2016
