= Islam Seraj =

Saudi Arabian footballer

Personal information
- Full name: Islam Hassan Seraj
- Date of birth: 7 March 1989 (age 37)
- Place of birth: Jeddah, Saudi Arabia
- Height: 1.78 m (5 ft 10 in)
- Position: Forward

Youth career
- Al Rabea

Senior career*
Years	Team	Apps	(Gls)
2009–2010	Al Rabea	?	
2010–2013	Al-Wehda	53	(10)
2013–2014	Al-Ettifaq	11	(4)
2014–2015	Al-Faisaly	21	(6)
2015–2018	Al-Ahli	23	(4)
2017–2018	→ Al-Faisaly (loan)	17	(7)
2018–2019	Ohod	11	(0)
2019	Damac	0	(0)
2019–2020	Al-Shoulla	19	(5)
2020–2021	Al-Arabi	8	(1)
2021	Jeddah	11	(2)
2021–2022	Al-Zulfi	12	(2)
2022	Al-Jubail	9	(1)
2022–2023	Al-Hejaz		
- * Club domestic league appearances and goals

Islam Hassan Seraj (Arabic: إسلام سراج; born 7 March 1989) is a Saudi professional football player who plays as a forward.

== Honours ==
Al-Wehda

- Saudi First Division Runner-up: 2011-12

Al-Ahli

- Saudi Professional League: 2015-16
- King Cup: 2016
- Saudi Super Cup: 2016
