= Naif Al-Balawi =

Saudi Arabian footballer

Personal information
- Full name: Naif Al-Balawi
- Date of birth: April 12, 1986 (age 40)
- Place of birth: Saudi Arabia
- Height: 1.70 m (5 ft 7 in)
- Position: Attacking midfielder

Youth career
- Al-Ittihad

Senior career*
Years	Team	Apps	(Gls)
2006–2010	Al-Ittihad	??	(1)
2009	→ Al-Watani (loan)	3	(0)
2010–2011	Ohod	??	(1)
2011–2012	Al-Ansar	7	(2)
2012–2013	Al-Nahda	??	(3)
2013	Al-Orobah	3	(0)
2014	Al-Hazem	??	(1)
2014–2016	Al-Qadsiah	28	(6)
2016	Najran		
2016–2017	Al-Shoulla	14	(1)
2017–2018	Al-Watani		
2020	Al-Suqoor		
- * Club domestic league appearances and goals

Naif Al-Balawi (Arabic: نايف البلوي, born 12 April 1986) is a Saudi Arabian football player who currently plays as an attacking midfielder.
