= Fahad Al-Sobeai =

Saudi Arabian footballer

Personal information
- Full name: Fahad Ali Al-Sobeai
- Date of birth: January 1, 1988 (age 38)
- Place of birth: Saudi Arabia
- Height: 1.68 m (5 ft 6 in)
- Position: Midfielder

Youth career
- Al-Nassr

Senior career*
Years	Team	Apps	(Gls)
2007–2009	Al-Nassr	1	(0)
2009–2014	Al-Qadisiyah	26	(2)
2014	Al-Raed	4	(0)
2014–2015	Najran	1	(0)
2015–2017	Al-Shoulla		
2017–2018	Al-Kawkab		
2018	Al-Shoulla		
2018–2019	Al-Riyadh		
- * Club domestic league appearances and goals

Fahad Ali Al-Sobeai (Arabic: فهد علي السبيعي; born 1 January 1988) is a Saudi Arabian football player who currently plays as midfielder.
