= Abdullah Dawsh =

Saudi footballer

Personal information
- Full name: Abdullah Dawsh
- Date of birth: December 12, 1987 (age 38)
- Place of birth: Saudi Arabia
- Height: 1.92 m (6 ft 4 in)
- Position: Defender

Senior career*
Years	Team	Apps	(Gls)
2007–2015	Al-Faisaly		
2015–2016	Al-Qadisiyah		
2016	Damac		
2016	Al-Shoalah		
2017–2018	Najd		
2018–2020	Al-Dera'a		
- * Club domestic league appearances and goals

Abdullah Dawsh (born 12 December 1987) is a Saudi football plays as a defender.
