= Younes Alaiwi =

Saudi Arabian footballer

Personal information
- Full name: Younes Alaiwi Al-Enezi
- Date of birth: 26 January 1990 (age 36)
- Place of birth: Saudi Arabia
- Position: Forward

Senior career*
Years	Team	Apps	(Gls)
2008–2014	Al-Batin		(21)
2014–2015	Al-Shoulla	23	(5)
2015–2016	Al-Hilal	0	(0)
2016	→ Al-Raed (loan)	4	(0)
2016–2017	Al-Khaleej		
- * Club domestic league appearances and goals as of 19:10, 5 June 2016 (UTC)

Younes Alaiwi Al-Enezi (Arabic: يونس عليوي العنزي; born January 26, 1990) is a Saudi football player who plays a forward for Al-Khaleej.
