= Abdulfattah Asiri =

Saudi Arabian footballer (born 1994)

Personal information
- Full name: Abdulfattah Tawfiq Asiri
- Date of birth: 26 February 1994 (age 32)
- Place of birth: Sabya, Saudi Arabia
- Height: 1.66 m (5 ft 5 in)
- Position: Winger

Youth career
- 2009–2011: Hetten

Senior career*
| Years | Team | Apps | (Gls) |
| 2011–2016 | Al-Ittihad | 55 | (11) |
| 2016–2020 | Al-Ahli | 77 | (16) |
| 2020–2023 | Al Nassr | 23 | (1) |
| 2023 | IFK Mariehamn | 7 | (1) |
| 2023–2024 | Al-Tai | 16 | (0) |
| 2024–2025 | Al-Kholood | 12 | (0) |

International career^{‡}
| 2013–2015 | Saudi Arabia U23 | | |
| 2013–2019 | Saudi Arabia | 20 | (2) |
- * Club domestic league appearances and goals as of 25 November 2024 ‡ National team caps and goals as of 8 December 2019

Abdulfattah Tawfiq Asiri (Arabic: عبد الفتاح توفيق عسيري; born 26 February 1994) is a Saudi Arabian professional footballer who plays as a winger.

== Career ==
On 27 April 2023, Asiri moved abroad for the first time after signing with Finnish Veikkausliiga side IFK Mariehamn for the 2023 season.

On 15 July 2023, Asiri returned to Saudi Arabia and joined Al-Tai on a two-year contract for an undisclosed fee.

On 2 September 2024, Asiri joined Al-Kholood on a one-year contract.

== International career ==
Asiri played his first international game with the senior national team on 28 December 2013 against Palestine (0–0), appearing in the starting team line-up and playing the entire match.

== Career statistics ==
As of 25 November 2024

Appearances and goals by club, season and competition
| Club | Season | League | | | National cups (Note: Includes King Cup, Saudi Crown Prince Cup and Suomen Cup) | | Other | | Continental (Note: Includes AFC Champions League) | | Total | |
| Club | Season | Division | Apps | Goals | Apps | Goals | Apps | Goals | Apps | Goals | Apps | Goals |
|---|---|---|---|---|---|---|---|---|---|---|---|---|
| Al-Ittihad | 2012–13 | Saudi Pro League | 9 | 3 | 5 | 0 | — | | — | | 14 | 3 |
| Al-Ittihad | 2013–14 | Saudi Pro League | 7 | 1 | 5 | 2 | 7 | 3 | 1 (Note: Appearances in Super Cup) | 0 | 20 | 6 |
| Al-Ittihad | 2014–15 | Saudi Pro League | 24 | 3 | 5 | 2 | 2 | 0 | — | | 31 | 5 |
| Al-Ittihad | 2015–16 | Saudi Pro League | 15 | 4 | 4 | 1 | 5 | 0 | — | | 24 | 5 |
| Al-Ittihad | Total | | 55 | 11 | 19 | 5 | 14 | 3 | 1 | 0 | 89 | 19 |
| Al-Ahli | 2016–17 | Saudi Pro League | 20 | 6 | 7 | 0 | 8 | 3 | — | | 35 | 9 |
| Al-Ahli | 2017–18 | Saudi Pro League | 19 | 1 | 3 | 1 | 4 | 0 | — | | 26 | 2 |
| Al-Ahli | 2018–19 | Saudi Pro League | 19 | 6 | 3 | 1 | 3 | 0 | 7 (Note: Appearances in Arab Club Champions Cup) | 0 | 32 | 7 |
| Al-Ahli | 2019–20 | Saudi Pro League | 19 | 3 | 2 | 0 | 3 | 2 | — | | 24 | 5 |
| Al-Ahli | Total | | 77 | 16 | 15 | 2 | 18 | 5 | 7 | 0 | 117 | 23 |
| Al Nassr | 2020–21 | Saudi Pro League | 7 | 1 | 3 | 0 | 5 | 1 | — | | 15 | 2 |
| Al Nassr | 2021–22 | Saudi Pro League | 15 | 0 | 4 | 0 | 8 | 2 | — | | 27 | 2 |
| Al Nassr | 2022–23 | Saudi ProLeague | 1 | 0 | 0 | 0 | 0 | 0 | — | | 1 | 0 |
| Al Nassr | Total | | 23 | 1 | 3 | 0 | 13 | 3 | 0 | 0 | 39 | 4 |
| IFK Mariehamn | 2023 | Veikkausliiga | 5 | 0 | 2 | 1 | 0 | 0 | — | | 7 | 1 |
| Al-Tai | 2023–24 | Saudi Pro League | 16 | 0 | 1 | 0 | — | | — | | 17 | 0 |
| Al-Kholood | 2024–25 | Saudi Pro League | 5 | 0 | 1 | 0 | – | | – | | 6 | 0 |
| Career total | | | 181 | 28 | 54 | 1 | 32 | 8 | 8 | 0 | 275 | 47 |

=== International ===
Statistics accurate as of match played 8 December 2019.

Saudi Arabia
| Year | Apps | Goals |
|---|---|---|
| 2013 | 2 | 0 |
| 2014 | 3 | 0 |
| 2015 | 1 | 0 |
| 2016 | 0 | 0 |
| 2017 | 5 | 0 |
| 2018 | 1 | 0 |
| 2019 | 8 | 2 |
| Total | 20 | 2 |

=== International goals ===
Scores and results list Saudi Arabia's goal tally first.

| No. | Date | Venue | Opponent | Score | Result | Competition |
|---|---|---|---|---|---|---|
| 1. | 10 October 2019 | King Abdullah Sport City Stadium, Buraidah, Saudi Arabia | Singapore | 1–0 | 3–0 | 2022 FIFA World Cup qualification |
| 2. | 10 October 2019 | King Abdullah Sport City Stadium, Buraidah, Saudi Arabia | Singapore | 3–0 | 3–0 | 2022 FIFA World Cup qualification |

== Honours ==
=== Club ===
Al-Ittihad

- King Cup of Champions: 2013

Al-Nassr

- Saudi Super Cup: 2020
