= Ali Awaji =

Saudi Arabian footballer

Personal information
- Full name: Ali Awaji
- Date of birth: August 2, 1989 (age 37)
- Place of birth: Yanbu, Saudi Arabia
- Height: 1.65 m (5 ft 5 in)
- Position: Winger

Team information
- Current team: Al-Majd
- Number: 10

Youth career
- Al-Majd

Senior career*
Years	Team	Apps	(Gls)
2009–2013	Al-Majd		
2013–2014	Ohod	27	(9)
2014–2016	Al-Wahda	43	(17)
2016–2020	Al-Ahli	11	(3)
2020–2021	Al-Tai	18	(1)
2022–2023	Al-Entesar		
2023–2024	Radwa		
2024–	Al-Majd		

International career^{‡}
2016	Saudi Arabia	1	(1)
- * Club domestic league appearances and goals as of 18:50, 12 January 2018 (UTC) ‡ National team caps and goals as of 23:27, 6 September 2016 (UTC)

Ali Awaji (Arabic: علي عواجي; born 2 August 1989) is a Saudi professional footballer who plays as a winger for Al-Majd.
