= Samer Salem (footballer, born 1992) =

Saudi Arabian footballer

Personal information
- Full name: Samer Salem Sattam
- Date of birth: 2 November 1992 (age 34)
- Place of birth: Jeddah, Saudi Arabia
- Position: Winger

Youth career
- Al-Ahli

Senior career*
Years	Team	Apps	(Gls)
2014–2016	Al-Ahli	0	(0)
2015	→ Al-Raed FC (loan)	11	(1)
2015–2016	→ Khaleej FC (loan)	6	(1)
2016–2017	Al-Raed FC		
2018–2019	Al-Najma		
2019–2020	Al-Anwar		
2020	Al-Tadamon		
2020–2022	Al-Suqoor		
2022	Radwa		
2022–2023	Hubuna		
- * Club domestic league appearances and goals

Samer Salem (Arabic: سامر سالم; born 2 November 1992) is a football plays as a winger.
