= 2011–12 Saudi First Division =

Saudi First Division
- Season: 2011–12
- Top goalscorer: Yones Alulaiwi Al-Enezi (21 Goals)
- Biggest home win: Al-Wahda 4–0 Al-Suqoor
- Biggest away win: Al-Wahda 6–3 Al-Baten

2011–12 Saudi First Division describes the events and results of the Saudi First Division League, the second tier of Saudi Arabian association football, for the 2011–12 season.

== Teams ==
Club	Location	Stadium
Abha	Abha	Prince Sultan bin Abdul Aziz Stadium
Al-Nahda	Dammam	Prince Fahad bin Salman Stadium
Al-Wahda	Mecca	King Abdul Aziz Stadium
Al-Jeel	Al-Hasa	Prince Abdullah bin Jalawi Stadium
Al-Khaleej	Saihat	Al-Khaleej Club Stadium
Al-Suqoor	Tabuk	Khalid bin Abdulaziz Stadium
Al-Nahda	Dammam	Prince Fahad bin Salman Stadium
Al-Shoalah	Al-Kharj	Al-Shoalah Club Stadium
Al-Ta'ee	Ha'il	Prince Abdul Aziz bin Musa'ed Stadium
Al-Watani	Tabuk	King Khalid Sport City Stadium
Damac	Khamis Mushait	Prince Sultan bin Abdul Aziz Stadium
Al Hazm	Ar Rass	Al Hazm Club Stadium
Al-Riyadh	Riyadh	Prince Turki bin Abdul Aziz Stadium
Hetten	Samtah	King Faisal Sport City Stadium
Ohud	Medina	Prince Mohammed bin Abdul Aziz Stadium
Al-Orubah	Al-Jawf	Al-Orubah Club Stadium

== League table ==
Pos	Team	Pld	W	D	L	Pts	Promotion or relegation
1	Al-Shoalah	30	15	10	5	55	Promotion to the Saudi Professional League
2	Al-Wahda	30	15	9	6	54	Promotion to the Saudi Professional League
3	Al-Nahda	30	14	10	6	52	
4	Abha	30	14	7	9	49	
5	Al-Hazem	30	13	9	8	48	
6	Al-Ta'i	30	12	11	7	47	
7	Al-Jeel	30	12	11	7	47	
8	Al-Khaleej	30	12	7	11	43	
9	Hetten	30	10	8	12	38	
10	Al-Orobah	30	10	7	13	37	
11	Al-Watani	30	10	6	14	36	
12	Al-Riyadh	30	7	13	10	34	
13	Al-Batin	30	8	10	12	34	
14	Ohud	30	7	7	16	28	Relegation to Saudi Second Division
15	Damac	30	6	8	16	26	Relegation to Saudi Second Division
16	Al-Suqoor	30	6	5	19	23	Relegation to Saudi Second Division
