= 2014–15 Saudi Crown Prince Cup =

2014–15 Crown Prince Cup
Tournament details
- Country: Saudi Arabia
- Dates: 9 August 2014 – 13 February 2015
- Teams: 30

Final positions
- Champions: Al-Ahli (6th title)
- Runners-up: Al-Hilal

Tournament statistics
- Matches played: 29
- Goals scored: 81 (2.79 per match)
- Top goal scorer(s): Hamza Al-Dardour (7 goals)
- All statistics correct as of 13 February 2015.

The 2014–15 Saudi Crown Prince Cup was the 40th season of the Saudi Crown Prince Cup since its establishment in 1957. This season's competition featured a total of 30 teams, 14 teams from the Pro League, and 16 teams from the First Division.

The holders were Al-Nassr who beat Al-Hilal 2–1 in the previous season's final on 1 February 2014. Al-Nassr were knocked out in the semi-finals by Al-Ahli.

The 2015 Crown Prince Cup Final was played between Al-Ahli and Al-Hilal at the King Fahd International Stadium in Riyadh. Al-Ahli defeated Al-Hilal 2–1 in the final to win their sixth Crown Prince Cup title and their first since 2007.

== First stage ==
=== Preliminary round ===
The Preliminary round fixtures were played on 9, 11, 12 & 21 August and 15 September 2014. Al-Ittihad's match was postponed due to their participation in the 2014 AFC Champions League quarter-finals. All times are local, AST (UTC+3).

9 August 2014 3	Al-Shoulla (1)	1–0 (a.e.t.)	Al-Tai (2)	Al-Kharj
19:10	Alaiwi 118'	Report		Stadium: Al-Shoulla Club Stadium

9 August 2014 10	Hetten (2)	2–1	Al-Fateh (1)	Jizan
19:20	Qarn 10', 38'	Report	Al-Nakhli 56'	Stadium: King Faisal Sport City Stadium; Referee: Amer Al-Shehri

9 August 2014 11	Al-Watani (2)	1–0	Najran (1)	Tabuk
19:50	Sharifi 50'	Report		Stadium: King Khalid Sport City Stadium

9 August 2014 1	Al-Qadisiyah (2)	2–2 (a.e.t.) (4–2 p)	Al-Taawoun (1)	Khobar
20:55	Al-Sayegh 81', 102'	Report	Al-Hussain 17' (pen.); Abu Hash'hash 110'	Stadium: Prince Saud bin Jalawi Stadium; Referee: Bandar Al-Enezi
	Penalties
	Al-Belwi (penalty scored); Al-Shamali (penalty scored); Kanno (penalty scored); Al-Khabrani (penalty scored)		(penalty missed) Al-Hussain; (penalty scored) Belal; (penalty scored) Ochieng; (penalty missed) Fallatah

10 August 2014 9	Al-Safa (2)	0–2	Al-Nahda (2)	Dammam
19:00		Report	Al-Dhahi 38' (pen.); Al-Hamdan 44'	Stadium: Prince Mohamed bin Fahd Stadium

10 August 2014 6	Al-Raed (1)	2–1	Al-Batin (2)	Buraidah
20:55	Taïr 33'; Al-Ayyaf 81'	Report	Ghaniman 28' (pen.)	Stadium: King Abdullah Sport City Stadium; Referee: Yehya Al-Qarni

10 August 2014 7	Al-Mujazzal (2)	0–2	Al-Ettifaq (2)	Al Majma'ah
20:55		Report	Bashir 28'; Rojas 88'	Stadium: Prince Salman Sport City Stadium

10 August 2014 13	Al-Diriyah (2)	1–3	Al-Khaleej (1)	Riyadh
20:55	Al-Khalifah 62'	Report	Al-Dardour 9', 15', 66'	Stadium: Prince Faisal bin Fahd Stadium; Referee: Fahad Al-Mirdasi

11 August 2014 5	Hajer (1)	1–0	Al-Wehda (2)	Al-Hasa
19:05	Aloísio 78' (pen.)	Report		Stadium: Prince Abdullah bin Jalawi Stadium; Referee: Turki Al-Khudhayr

11 August 2014 4	Al-Ahli (1)	1–0	Al-Hazem (2)	Mecca
20:55	Al-Amri 90+4'	Report		Stadium: King Abdul Aziz Stadium; Referee: Abdulrahman Al-Amri

11 August 2014 14	Al-Shabab (1)	2–0	Al-Riyadh (2)	Riyadh
20:55	Haroon 71'; Hazazi 81' (pen.)	Report		Stadium: Prince Faisal bin Fahd Stadium; Referee: Abdulrahman Al-Ahmari

21 August 2014 2	Al-Faisaly (1)	2–1	Abha (2)	Al Majma'ah
19:20	Nicácio 5' (pen.); Al-Thamali 67'		Williams 11' (pen.)	Stadium: Prince Salman Sport City Stadium

21 August 2014 12	Al-Orobah (1)	3–0	Al-Jeel (2)	Sakakah
19:20	Banahene 43'; Narry 83'; Al-Rashidi 90+3'			Stadium: Al-Orobah Club Stadium

15 September 2014 8	Al-Fayha (2)	0–4	Al-Ittihad (1)	Al Majma'ah
19:00		Report	Marquinho 8' (pen.); Ya Konan 21' (pen.), 45', 47'	Stadium: Prince Salman Sport City Stadium; Referee: Khaled Salwi

== Second stage ==
=== Bracket ===
Round of 16
H	Al-Nassr	2
A	Al-Qadisiyah	0
A	Al Faisaly	0
H	Al-Shoulla	2
H	Al-Ahli	2
A	Hajer	0
H	Al-Raed	1
A	Al-Ettifaq	2
A	Al-Hilal (a.e.t.)	3
H	Al-Ittihad	2
H	Al-Nahda	2 (2)
A	Hetten (pen.)	2 (4)
H	Al-Watani	1
A	Al-Orobah	2
H	Al-Khaleej	2
A	Al-Shabab	1

Quarter-finals
A	Al-Nassr	3
H	Al-Shoulla	1
A	Al-Ahli	2
H	Al-Ettifaq	1
H	Al-Hilal	3
A	Hetten	0
H	Al-Orobah	1
A	Al-Khaleej	3

Semi-finals
A	Al-Nassr	1
H	Al-Ahli	2
H	Al-Hilal	3
A	Al-Khaleej	0

Final
–	Al-Ahli	2
–	Al-Hilal	1

Note: H: Home team, A: Away team

=== Round of 16 ===
The Round of 16 fixtures were played on 22 & 23 September 2014. The Al-Ittihad v Al-Hilal match was delayed to 23 December 2014 due to Al-Hilal's participation in the semi-finals of the 2014 AFC Champions League. All times are local, AST (UTC+3).

22 September 2014 18	Al-Raed (1)	1–2	Al-Ettifaq (2)	Buraidah
20:15	Darwish 13'	Report	Kanno 5'; Al-Sulim 83'	Stadium: King Abdullah Sport City Stadium; Referee: Khaled Salwi

22 September 2014 17	Al-Ahli (1)	2–0	Hajer (1)	Jeddah
20:20	Al Somah 19' (pen.), 28'	Report		Stadium: King Abdullah Sports City; Attendance: 14,835; Referee: Fahad Al-Oraini

22 September 2014 20	Al-Nahda (2)	2–2 (a.e.t.) (2–4 p)	Hetten (2)	Dammam
20:20	Al-Qasmah 84' (pen.); Al-Aliany 96'	Report	Dawsh 19'; Al-Shathly 104'	Stadium: Prince Mohamed bin Fahd Stadium; Referee: Sultan Al-Harbi
	Penalties
	Shengeeti (penalty scored); Al-Saad (penalty missed); Al-Aliany (penalty scored); Al-Qasmah (penalty missed)		(penalty scored) Al-Fallat; (penalty scored) Jaber; (penalty scored) Majrashi; (penalty scored) Maddbash

22 September 2014 15	Al-Nassr (1)	2–0	Al-Qadisiyah (2)	Riyadh
20:25	Al-Shehri 25', 48'	Report		Stadium: Prince Faisal bin Fahd Stadium; Attendance: 6,416; Referee: Mishari Al-Mishari

23 September 2014 16	Al-Shoulla (1)	2–0	Al-Faisaly (1)	Al-Kharj
20:15	Alaiwi 56'; Al-Khaibari 83'	Report		Stadium: Al-Shoulla Club Stadium; Referee: Abdulrahman Al-Shehri

23 September 2014 22	Al-Khaleej (1)	2–1	Al-Shabab (1)	Dammam
20:15	Al-Mubarak 27'; Al-Dardour 62'	Report	Al-Mehyani 38'	Stadium: Prince Mohamed bin Fahd Stadium; Referee: Abdulrahman Al-Sultan

23 September 2014 21	Al-Watani (2)	1–2	Al-Orobah (1)	Tabuk
20:20	Abo Jaber 69'	Report	Rawaf 4'; Al-Daraan 12'	Stadium: King Khalid Sport City Stadium; Referee: Khaled Al-Sennani

23 December 2014 19	Al-Ittihad (1)	2–3	Al-Hilal (1)	Jeddah
20:20	Marquinho 9' (pen.); Asiri 43'	Report	Al-Faraj 18'; Al-Shamrani 35', 98'	Stadium: King Abdullah Sports City; Attendance: 58,510; Referee: Fahad Al-Mirdasi

=== Quarter-finals ===
The Quarter-finals fixtures were played on 23 & 24 December 2014. The Al-Hilal v Hetten match was delayed due to Al-Hilal's participation in the 2014 AFC Champions League Final. All times are local, AST (UTC+3).

23 December 2014 23	Al-Shoulla (1)	1–3	Al-Nassr (1)	Al-Kharj
15:15	Al-Khaibari 90'	Report	Al-Sahlawi 6'; Hawsawi 32'; Al-Shehri 52'	Stadium: Al-Shoulla Club Stadium; Referee: Mishari Al-Mishari

23 December 2014 24	Al-Ettifaq (2)	1–2	Al-Ahli (1)	Dammam
17:35	Al-Zubaidi 61'	Report	M. Hawsawi 12'; El Kabir 65'	Stadium: Prince Mohamed bin Fahd Stadium; Referee: Turki Al-Khudhayr

24 December 2014 26	Al-Orobah (1)	1–3	Al-Khaleej (1)	Sakakah
15:10	Al-Gizani 83'	Report	Al-Dardour 40', 74', 90+4'	Stadium: Al-Orobah Club Stadium; Referee: Khaled Al-Sennani

2 February 2015 25	Al-Hilal (1)	3–0	Hetten (2)	Riyadh
20:15	Neves 14' (pen.); Al-Faraj 63'; Duba 90' (o.g.)	Report		Stadium: Prince Faisal bin Fahd Stadium; Attendance: 700; Referee: Khaled Al-Sennani

=== Semi-finals ===
The Semi-finals fixtures were played on 9 February 2015. All times are local, AST (UTC+3).

9 February 2015 28	Al-Hilal (1)	3–0	Al-Khaleej (1)	Riyadh
18:25	Neves 11', 45' (pen.); Al-Shamrani 40'	Report		Stadium: Prince Faisal bin Fahd Stadium; Referee: Marai Al Awaji

9 February 2015 27	Al-Ahli (1)	2–1	Al-Nassr (1)	Jeddah
20:30	César 42'; Hawsawi 66' (o.g.)	Report	Al-Raheb 14'	Stadium: King Abdullah Sports City; Attendance: 40,000; Referee: Turki Al-Khudhayr

=== Final ===
The final was held on 13 February 2015 in the King Fahd International Stadium in Riyadh. All times are local, AST (UTC+3).

13 February 2015
20:30

Al-Ahli	2–1	Al-Hilal
Al Somah 59'; M. Hawsawi 68'	Report	Samaras 76'

King Fahd International Stadium, Riyadh
Attendance: 50,437
Referee: Turki Al-Khudhayr

== Top goalscorers ==
As of 13 February 2015

Rank	Player	Club	Goals
1	(Jordan) Hamza Al-Dardour	Al-Khaleej	7
2	(Saudi Arabia) Yahya Al-Shehri	Al-Nassr	3
2	(Brazil) Thiago Neves	Al-Hilal	3
2	(Ivory Coast) Didier Ya Konan	Al-Ittihad	3
2	(Saudi Arabia) Nasser Al-Shamrani	Al-Hilal	3
2	(Syria) Omar Al Somah	Al-Ahli	3
