= 2016 King's Cup (Saudi Arabia) =

2016 King Cup
Tournament details
- Country: Saudi Arabia
- Dates: 19 January – 29 May 2016
- Teams: 32

Final positions
- Champions: Al-Ahli
- Runners-up: Al-Nassr

Tournament statistics
- Matches played: 31
- Goals scored: 95 (3.06 per match)
- Top goal scorer(s): Omar Al Somah (4 goals)

The 2016 King Cup, or The Custodian of The Two Holy Mosques Cup, was the 41st season of King Cup since its establishment in 1957, and the 9th under the current edition. It started on 19 January and ended on 29 May 2016. Al-Hilal were the defending champions, but they were eliminated in the semifinals.

Al-Ahli won their third title in the current edition and the thirteenth overall after beating Al-Nassr 2–1 after extra time in the final.

== Participating teams ==
A total of 32 teams participated in this season., 14 teams of Professional league, 16 teams of First Division, and 2 teams qualifying from preliminary stage.

League	Teams
Pro league	Al-Hilal ^{TH}; Al-Ahli; Al-Faisaly; Al-Fateh; Al-Ittihad; Al-Khaleej; Al-Nassr; Al-Qadisiyah; Al-Raed; Al-Shabab; Al-Taawoun; Al-Wehda; Hajer; Najran
1st Division	Al-Batin; Al-Diriyah; Al-Ettifaq; Al-Feiha; Al-Hazm; Al-Jeel; Al-Mojzel; Al-Nahda; Al-Nojoom; Al-Orobah; Al-Riyadh; Al-Shoulla; Al-Tai; Al-Watani; Damac; Ohod
2nd Division	Abha; Al Jabalain

== Bracket ==
Round of 32
A	Al-Hilal	2
H	Al-Nahda	1
A	Najran	1
H	Al-Nojoom	2
H	Al-Taawoun	1
A	Al-Mojzel	2
A	Al-Khaleej	2
H	Al-Watani	0
H	Al-Shabab	2
A	Al-Ettifaq	0
H	Al-Raed	1
A	Al-Feiha	0
H	Hajer	1
A	Damac	2
H	Al-Ahli	3
A	Al-Tai	0
A	Al-Nassr	7
H	Al-Diriyah	0
A	Al-Shoulla	2
H	Abha	0
A	Al-Orobah	3
H	Al Jabalain	1
A	Al-Faisaly	0 (4)
H	Al-Jeel (p)	0 (5)
A	Al-Fateh	0
H	Al-Hazm	1
A	Al-Qadisiyah	2
H	Al-Batin	3
H	Al-Wehda	2
A	Ohod	1
H	Al-Ittihad	4
A	Al-Riyadh	0

Round of 16
A	Al-Hilal	2
H	Al-Nojoom	0
A	Al-Mojzel	2
H	Al-Khaleej	1
H	Al-Shabab	2
A	Al-Raed	3
H	Damac	1
A	Al-Ahli	2
A	Al-Nassr	2
H	Al-Shoulla	1
H	Al-Orobah	2
A	Al-Jeel	0
H	Al-Hazm (p)	2 (5)
A	Al-Batin	2 (3)
A	Al-Wehda	0
H	Al-Ittihad	2

Quarter-finals
A	Al-Hilal	4
H	Al-Mojzel	1
H	Al-Raed	1
A	Al-Ahli	3
H	Al-Nassr	3
A	Al-Orobah	1
A	Al-Hazm	0
H	Al-Ittihad (w/o)	3

Semi-finals
H	Al-Hilal	2
A	Al-Ahli (aet)	3
A	Al-Nassr	3
H	Al-Ittihad	1

Final
–	Al-Ahli (aet)	2
–	Al-Nassr	1

Note: H: Home team, A: Away team

source: SAFF

== Round of 32 ==
Round of 32 were played between 19 and 25 January 2016. All times are local, AST (UTC+3).

19 January 2016 1	Abha	0–2	Al-Shoulla	Abha
15:20			Al-Dwesan 29'; Al-Bishi 85'	Stadium: Prince Sultan bin Abdul Aziz Stadium

19 January 2016 2	Al Jabalain	1–3	Al-Orobah	Ha'il
15:40	Zayed 55'		Muath 26', 37'; Al-Enezi 77'	Stadium: Prince Abdul Aziz bin Musa'ed Stadium

20 January 2016 3	Al-Taawoun	1–2	Al-Mojzel	Buraidah
18:15	Al-Mutairi 79' (o.g.)		Al-Qarni 3'; Al-Muraished 57'	Stadium: King Abdullah Sport City Stadium

20 January 2016 4	Al-Wehda	2–1	Ohod	Makkah
20:00	Al-Faresi 56'; Haroon 80'		Al-Dhaw 5'	Stadium: King Abdul Aziz Stadium

20 January 2016 5	Al-Diriyah	0–7	Al-Nassr	Riyadh
20:00			Adrian 4', 70', 86'; Al-Sahlawi 40', 42'; Al-Qahtani 55' (o.g.); Husain 72'	Stadium: Prince Faisal bin Fahd Stadium

21 January 2016 6	Al-Hazm	1–0	Al-Fateh	Ar Rass
15:40	Al-Harbi 60'			Stadium: Al Hazm Club Stadium

21 January 2016 7	Al-Jeel	0–0 (a.e.t.) (5–4 p)	Al-Faisaly	Al-Hasa
17:55				Stadium: Prince Abdullah bin Jalawi Stadium
	Penalties
	Al-Yousef (penalty scored); Al-Sabah (penalty missed); Al-Muqairen (penalty missed); Adam (penalty scored); Al-Abdullah (penalty scored); Al-Khamis (penalty scored); Al-Majhad (penalty scored)		(penalty missed) Balboa; (penalty scored) Camará; (penalty scored) Sowid; (penalty missed) Al-Munaif; (penalty scored) Al-Enezi; (penalty scored) Sadat; (penalty missed) Mohammed Salem

21 January 2016 8	Al-Nahda	1–2	Al-Hilal	Dammam
17:55	Diakité 26'		Aílton 83'; Jahfali 86'	Stadium: Prince Mohamed bin Fahd Stadium

21 January 2016 9	Al-Ahli	3–0	Al-Tai	Jeddah
20:00	Al-Somah 22' (pen.), 57'; Hawsawi 83' (pen.)			Stadium: King Abdullah Sports City

22 January 2016 10	Al-Raed	1–0	Al-Feiha	Buraidah
15:40	Al-Shehri 10'			Stadium: King Abdullah Sport City Stadium

22 January 2016 11	Al-Nojoom	2–1	Najran	Al-Hasa
17:55	Sharoumah 10', 77'		Al-Mehyani 41'	Stadium: Prince Abdullah bin Jalawi Stadium

23 January 2016 12	Al-Watani	0–2	Al-Khaleej	Tabuk
16:05			Al-Salem 32'; Al-Swilem 72'	Stadium: King Khalid Sport City Stadium

23 January 2016 13	Hajer	1–2	Damac	Al-Hasa
17:55	Lopes 66' (pen.)		Suanon 29', 76' (pen.)	Stadium: Prince Abdullah bin Jalawi Stadium

24 January 2016 14	Al-Batin	3–2	Al-Qadisiyah	Hafar al-Batin
15:25	Ayadah 46', 61' (pen.); Haqawi 75'		Macena 55'; Al-Amer 60'	Stadium: Al-Batin Club Stadium

24 January 2016 15	Al-Shabab	2–0	Al-Ettifaq	Riyadh
18:10	Muath 17'; Benyettou 34'			Stadium: King Fahd International Stadium

25 January 2016 16	Al-Ittihad	4–0	Al-Riyadh	Jeddah
20:00	Rivas 11'; Asiri 13'; Sânmărtean 16'; Fallatah 49'			Stadium: King Abdullah Sports City

== Round of 16 ==
Round of 16 were played between 31 January and 18 March 2016. All times are local, AST (UTC+3).

31 January 2016 17	Al-Shoulla	1–2	Al-Nassr	Al-Kharj
18:15	Attiyah 90+2'		Maïga 4', 78'	Stadium: Al-Shoalah Club Stadium

31 January 2016 18	Al-Nojoom	0–2	Al-Hilal	Al-Hasa
19:30			Eduardo 11', 55'	Stadium: Prince Abdullah bin Jalawi Stadium

1 February 2016 19	Damac	1–2	Al-Ahli	Abha
16:00	Suanon 52'		Seraj 38'; M.Hawsawi 65' (pen.)	Stadium: Prince Sultan bin Abdul Aziz Stadium; Attendance: 16,400

7 March 2016 20	Al-Orobah	2–0	Al-Jeel	Sakakah
16:20	Al-Joni 38'; Rawaf 76'			Stadium: Al-Oruba Club Stadium

8 March 2016 21	Al-Hazm	2–2 (a.e.t.) (5–3 p)	Al-Batin	Ar Rass
16:00	Jahfali 59'; Al-Harbi 73'		Fuaad 37'; Al-Zafiri 67'	Stadium: Al Hazm Club Stadium
	Penalties
	Al-Harbi (penalty scored); Al-Tolayhi (penalty scored); Khunaifer (penalty scored); Al-Shubaili (penalty scored); Al-Mansor (penalty scored)		(penalty missed) Ghneman; (penalty scored) Haqawi; (penalty scored) Al-Dakheel; (penalty scored) Al-Shammari

8 March 2016 22	Al-Ittihad	2–0	Al-Wehda	Jeddah
20:45	Assiri 55'; Fallatah 90'			Stadium: King Abdullah Sports City

17 March 2016 23	Al-Shabab	2–3	Al-Raed	Riyadh
18:45	Camilo 85'; Benyettou 89'		Al-Johani 18' (pen.), 80'; Al-Khaibri 54' (o.g.)	Stadium: Prince Faisal bin Fahd Stadium

18 March 2016 24	Al-Khaleej	1–2	Al-Mojzel	Khobar
18:30	Al Salem 78'		Al-Dakhil 66'; Al-Menqash 90+5'	Stadium: Prince Saud bin Jalawi Stadium

== Quarter-finals ==
Quarter-finals were played on 12 and 13 April 2016. All times are local, AST (UTC+3).

12 April 2016 25	Al-Mojzel	1–4	Al-Hilal	Al Majma'ah
19:05	Al-Bishi 83'	Report	Al-Qahtani 63', 74'; Kaabi 80'; Aílton 90'	Stadium: King Salman Sport City Stadium; Referee: Khaled Salwi

12 April 2016 26	Al-Raed	1–3	Al-Ahli	Buraidah
19:05	Al-Johani 25'	Report	Marquinho 19'; M. Al-Harbi 30', 90+1'	Stadium: King Abdullah Sport City Stadium; Referee: Sultan Al-Harbi

12 April 2016 27	Al-Nassr	3–1	Al-Orobah	Riyadh
21:00	Hazazi 1', 48'; Al-Shehri 71'	Report	Al-Kwikbi 89' (pen.)	Stadium: King Fahd International Stadium; Referee: Mishari Al-Mishari

13 April 2016 28	Al-Ittihad	Cancelled	Al-Hazm	Jeddah
21:00				Stadium: King Abdullah Sports City

Notes

1. Al-Ittihad won on walkover after Al-Hazm failed to arrive for the match.

== Semi-finals ==
Semi-finals were played on 29 and 30 April 2016. All times are local, AST (UTC+3).

29 April 2016 29	Al-Hilal	2–3 (a.e.t.)	Al-Ahli	Riyadh
20:45	Al-Zori 7'; Al-Salem 73' (pen.)	Report	Assiri 59', 78'; Marquinho 114'	Stadium: King Fahd International Stadium; Referee: Milorad Mažić (Serbia)

30 April 2016 30	Al-Ittihad	1–3	Al-Nassr	Jeddah
20:45	Sânmărtean 90+3'	Report	S. Sharahili 42'; Al-Fraidi 62'; Ghaleb 70'	Stadium: King Abdullah Sports City; Referee: Pavel Královec (Czech Republic)

== Final ==
29 May 2016
21:00 AST
(UTC+3)

Al-Ahli	2–1 (a.e.t.)	Al-Nassr
Al-Somah 24', 115'	Report	Al-Fraidi 61'

King Abdullah Sports City, Jeddah
Attendance: 53,465
Referee: Carlos Velasco Carballo (Spain)
