= 2019–20 Al-Ahli Saudi FC season =

Al-Ahli
2019–20 season
- President: Ahmed Al-Sayegh (until 28 January); Abdulelah Mouminah (from 8 February)
- Manager: Branko Ivanković (until 16 September); Christian Gross (from 16 October until 17 February); Vladan Milojević (from 28 February)
- Stadium: King Abdullah Sports City
- Pro League: 3rd
- King Cup: Semi-finals
- 2019 ACL: Round of 16
- 2020 ACL: Quarter-finals
- Top goalscorer: League: Omar Al Somah (19); All: Omar Al Somah (23)
- Highest home attendance: 48,094 vs Al-Hilal (6 August 2019)
- Lowest home attendance: 2,462 vs Al-Jandal (5 November 2019)
- Average home league attendance: 12,792
Home colours	Away colours
- All statistics correct as of 30 September 2020.

The 2019–20 season was Al-Ahli's 44th consecutive season in the top flight of Saudi football and 83rd year in existence as a football club. The club participated in the Pro League, the King Cup and both the 2019 and the 2020 editions of the AFC Champions League.

The season covered the period from 1 July 2019 to 30 September 2020.

== Players ==
=== Squad information ===
As of 1 February 2020

Note: Flags indicate national team as defined under FIFA eligibility rules; some limited exceptions apply. Players may hold more than one non-FIFA nationality.

No.	Pos.	Nation	Player
1	GK	KSA	Yasser Al-Mosailem
2	DF	KSA	Saeed Al-Mowalad
3	DF	KSA	Mohammed Al-Fatil
5	DF	KSA	Mohammed Al-Khabrani
6	MF	BRA	Souza
7	MF	KSA	Salman Al-Moasher
8	MF	BIH	Elvis Sarić
9	FW	SYR	Omar Al Somah
10	MF	KSA	Abdulfattah Asiri
11	MF	KSA	Housain Al-Mogahwi
13	DF	KSA	Yazeed Al-Bakr
14	FW	KSA	Muhannad Assiri
15	MF	KSA	Mohammed Al-Majhad
16	MF	KSA	Nooh Al-Mousa
17	MF	GER	Marko Marin

No.	Pos.	Nation	Player
19	MF	ALG	Youcef Belaïli
21	FW	CPV	Djaniny
23	DF	KSA	Abdullah Hassoun
24	DF	KSA	Hussein Abdulghani (captain)
25	DF	KSA	Motaz Hawsawi
29	FW	KSA	Abdulrahman Ghareeb
33	GK	KSA	Mohammed Al-Owais
34	FW	KSA	Mazen Abo Shararah (on loan from Damac)
35	MF	KSA	Yousef Al-Harbi
37	DF	KSA	Abdulbasit Hindi
40	MF	KSA	Ali Al-Asmari
44	GK	KSA	Mohammed Al Rubaie
60	DF	BRA	Lucas Lima
66	GK	KSA	Basem Atallah
70	DF	KSA	Mohammed Bassas

=== Out on loan ===
Note: Flags indicate national team as defined under FIFA eligibility rules; some limited exceptions apply. Players may hold more than one non-FIFA nationality.

No.	Pos.	Nation	Player
4	DF	KSA	Khaled Al-Barakah (at Al-Ettifaq until 30 June 2020)
15	MF	KSA	Abdulaziz Al-Shahrani (at Damac until 30 June 2020)
18	FW	CHA	Othman Alhaj (at Al-Fayha until 30 June 2020)
20	DF	KSA	Ali Al-Zubaidi (at Al-Wehda until 30 June 2020)
27	MF	KSA	Sultan Mendash (at Al-Taawoun until 30 June 2020)
30	DF	KSA	Hani Al-Sebyani (at Al-Fayha until 30 June 2020)
32	DF	KSA	Faisal Darisi (at Al-Raed until 30 June 2020)

No.	Pos.	Nation	Player
40	MF	KSA	Yahya Al-Qarni (at Ohod until 30 June 2020)
75	DF	BRA	Aderlan Santos (at Rio Ave until 30 June 2020)
77	MF	KSA	Omar Al-Zayni (at Al-Qadsiah until 30 June 2020)
—	DF	KSA	Mohammed Al-Zubaidi (at Al-Hazem until 30 June 2020)
—	MF	KSA	Nasser Al-Daajani (at Al-Taawoun until 30 June 2020)
—	MF	KSA	Abdulrahman Al-Harthi (at Al-Khaleej until 30 June 2020)

== Transfers and loans ==
=== Transfers in ===
Entry date	Position	No.	Player	From club	Fee	Ref.
30 April 2019	MF	27	(Saudi Arabia) Sultan Mendash	(Saudi Arabia) Al-Faisaly	Free	
31 May 2019	DF	4	(Saudi Arabia) Khaled Al-Barakah	(Saudi Arabia) Al-Hazem	$1,100,000	
27 June 2019	DF	13	(Saudi Arabia) Yazeed Al-Bakr	(Saudi Arabia) Al-Faisaly	$2,135,000	
28 June 2019	DF	5	(Saudi Arabia) Mohammed Al-Khabrani	(Saudi Arabia) Al-Qadsiah	$2,135,000	
8 July 2019	MF	22	(Serbia) Danijel Aleksić	(Turkey) Yeni Malatyaspor	$2,245,000	
12 July 2019	MF	8	(Bosnia and Herzegovina) Elvis Sarić	(South Korea) Suwon Bluewings	$1,685,000	
1 August 2019	DF	87	(Bosnia and Herzegovina) Ervin Zukanović	(Italy) Genoa	$2,245,000	
29 August 2019	MF	19	(Algeria) Youcef Belaïli	(Tunisia) ES Tunis	$3,300,000	
30 August 2019	MF	15	(Saudi Arabia) Mohammed Al-Majhad	(Saudi Arabia) Al-Fateh	$3,500,000	
30 August 2019	DF	60	(Brazil) Lucas Lima	(France) Nantes	$6,600,000	
5 January 2020	MF	17	(Germany) Marko Marin	(Serbia) Red Star Belgrade	$2,500,000	

=== Loans in ===
Start date	End date	Position	No.	Player	From club	Fee	Ref.
31 January 2020	End of season	FW	34	(Saudi Arabia) Mazen Abo Shararah	(Saudi Arabia) Damac	None	
7 September 2020	31 July 2021	MF	32	(Saudi Arabia) Hassan Al-Qeed	(Saudi Arabia) Al-Shabab	None	

=== Transfers out ===
Exit date	Position	No.	Player	To club	Fee	Ref.
22 May 2019	DF	13	(Egypt) Mohamed Abdel Shafy	(Egypt) Zamalek	Released	
4 July 2019	MF	71	(Romania) Nicolae Stanciu	(Czech Republic) Slavia Prague	$6,730,000	
11 July 2019	MF	5	(Argentina) Claudio Baeza	(Mexico) Necaxa	$3,365,000	
15 July 2019	MF	28	(Saudi Arabia) Ayman Al-Khulaif	(Saudi Arabia) Al-Wehda	$535,000	
26 July 2019	MF	–	(Saudi Arabia) Maher Othman	(Saudi Arabia) Al-Batin	Free	
28 July 2019	MF	49	(Saudi Arabia) Ahmed Al-Zain	(Saudi Arabia) Al-Raed	$267,500	
29 July 2019	GK	22	(Saudi Arabia) Ahmed Al-Rehaili	(Saudi Arabia) Al-Raed	Free	
1 August 2019	DF	17	(Chile) Paulo Díaz	(Argentina) River Plate	$4,500,000	
7 August 2019	DF	4	(Spain) Alexis	(Spain) Racing de Santander	Free	
17 August 2019	GK	41	(Saudi Arabia) Majed Al-Ghamdi	(Saudi Arabia) Al-Hazem	Free	
18 August 2019	MF	50	(Saudi Arabia) Abdullah Majrashi	(Saudi Arabia) Al-Raed	Undisclosed	
21 August 2019	DF	32	(Saudi Arabia) Abdullah Al-Khateeb	(Saudi Arabia) Al-Ettifaq	Free	
30 August 2019	MF	22	(Serbia) Danijel Aleksić	(Turkey) İstanbul Başakşehir	Undisclosed	
4 September 2019	MF	8	(Saudi Arabia) Taisir Al-Jassim	(Kuwait) Al-Nasr	Free	
28 January 2020	MF	47	(Saudi Arabia) Mustafa Bassas	(Saudi Arabia) Al-Faisaly	Free	
31 January 2020	DF	87	(Bosnia and Herzegovina) Ervin Zukanović	(Italy) S.P.A.L.	Free	

=== Loans out ===
Start date	End date	Position	No.	Player	To club	Fee	Ref.
9 July 2019	End of season	DF	27	(Saudi Arabia) Mohammed Al-Zubaidi	(Saudi Arabia) Al-Hazem	None	
10 July 2019	End of season	DF	32	(Saudi Arabia) Faisal Darisi	(Saudi Arabia) Al-Raed	None	
11 July 2019	End of season	MF	15	(Saudi Arabia) Abdulaziz Al-Shahrani	(Saudi Arabia) Damac	None	
15 July 2019	End of season	DF	20	(Saudi Arabia) Ali Al-Zubaidi	(Saudi Arabia) Al-Wehda	None	
23 July 2019	End of season	MF	40	(Saudi Arabia) Yahya Al-Qarni	(Saudi Arabia) Ohod	None	
24 July 2019	End of season	MF	–	(Saudi Arabia) Abdulrahman Al-Harthi	(Saudi Arabia) Al-Khaleej	None	
4 August 2019	End of season	DF	30	(Saudi Arabia) Hani Al-Sebyani	(Saudi Arabia) Al-Fayha	None	
14 August 2019	End of season	DF	75	(Brazil) Aderlan Santos	(Portugal) Rio Ave	None	
30 August 2019	End of season	MF	77	(Saudi Arabia) Omar Al-Zayni	(Saudi Arabia) Al-Qadsiah	None	
31 August 2019	End of season	FW	18	(Chad) Othman Alhaj	(Saudi Arabia) Al-Fayha	None	
10 January 2020	End of season	MF	27	(Saudi Arabia) Sultan Mendash	(Saudi Arabia) Al-Taawoun	None	
31 January 2020	End of season	DF	4	(Saudi Arabia) Khaled Al-Barakah	(Saudi Arabia) Al-Ettifaq	None	

== Pre-season ==
14 July 2019 Friendly	Al-Ahli (Saudi Arabia)	3–2	(Croatia) Varaždin	Varaždin, Croatia
18:00 CEST	Al Somah 18'; Al-Mogahwi 25'; Asiri 29'	Report	Stolnik 16'; Kolarić 56'	Stadium: Stadion Varteks

17 July 2019 Friendly	Al-Ahli (Saudi Arabia)	1–0	(Slovenia) Rudar Velenje	Graz, Austria
17:00 CEST	Bassas 53'	Report		Stadium: Training Center Messendorf

20 July 2019 Friendly	Al-Ahli (Saudi Arabia)	3–1	(Slovenia) Dravograd	Bad Blumau, Austria
17:00 CEST	Ghareeb 29'; Alhaj 42', 89'	Report	40'	Stadium: Stadion Bad Blumau

21 July 2019 Friendly	Al-Ahli (Saudi Arabia)	3–0	(Serbia) Žarkovo	Kumberg, Austria
17:00 CEST	Al Somah 30' (pen.); Asiri 45'; Al-Mogahwi 73'	Report		Stadium: Stadion Kumberg

23 July 2019 Friendly	Al-Ahli (Saudi Arabia)	3–0	(Slovenia) Bravo	Bad Blumau, Austria
17:00 CEST	Aleksić 34'; Alhaj 48'; Mendash 76'	Report		Stadium: Stadion Bad Blumau

== Competitions ==
=== Overview ===
Competition	Record							
Competition	G	W	D	L	GF	GA	GD	Win %
Pro League	30	15	5	10	49	36	+13	50.00
King Cup	4	4	0	0	10	3	+7	100.00
2019 Champions League	2	1	0	1	3	4	−1	50.00
2020 Champions League	8	3	2	3	7	10	−3	37.50
Total	44	23	7	14	69	53	+16	52.27

Updated to match played 30 September 2020
Source: Competitions

=== Pro League ===
==== League table ====
Pos	Team	Pld	W	D	L	GF	GA	GD	Pts	Qualification or relegation
1	Al-Hilal (C)	30	22	6	2	74	26	+48	72	Qualification for AFC Champions League group stage
2	Al-Nassr	30	19	7	4	60	26	+34	64	Qualification for AFC Champions League group stage
3	Al-Ahli	30	15	5	10	49	36	+13	50	Qualification for AFC Champions League group stage
4	Al-Wehda	30	16	1	13	45	40	+5	49	Qualification for AFC Champions League play-off round
5	Al-Faisaly	30	14	6	10	41	36	+5	48	

Updated to match(es) played on 9 September 2020. Source: spl.com
Rules for classification: 1) Points; 2) Head-to-head points; 3) Head-to-head goal difference; 4) Total goal difference; 5) Total goals scored; 6) Fair-play points (Note: Head-to-head record is used only after all the matches between the teams in question have been played).
(C) Champions

==== Results summary ====
Overall								Home						Away					
Pld	W	D	L	GF	GA	GD	Pts	W	D	L	GF	GA	GD	W	D	L	GF	GA	GD
30	15	5	10	49	36	+13	50	10	3	2	31	15	+16	5	2	8	18	21	−3

Last updated: 9 September 2020.

==== Results by round ====
Round	1	2	3	4	5	6	7	8	9	10	11	12	13	14	15	16	17	18	19	20	21	22	23	24	25	26	27	28	29	30
Ground	H	A	H	A	H	A	H	A	H	H	A	H	A	H	A	A	H	A	H	A	H	A	H	A	A	H	A	H	A	H
Result	D	W	L	W	D	W	W	L	W	W	L	W	L	W	W	D	W	L	L	D	W	L	W	W	L	W	L	D	L	W
Position	7	4	9	4	4	3	3	4	3	3	4	2	3	3	3	3	3	3	3	3	3	4	3	3	3	3	3	3	3	3

Updated to match(es) played on 9 September 2020. Source:
A = Away; H = Home; W = Win; D = Draw; L = Loss

==== Matches ====
All times are local, AST (UTC+3).

Win Draw Loss Postponed

22 August 2019 1	Al-Ahli	1–1	Al-Adalah	Jeddah
20:50	Abdulghani (yellow card) 19'; Aleksić 45+4'; Zukanović (yellow card) 67'	Report	Al-Burayh (yellow card) 31'; Biteghé (yellow card) 55'; Cissé 88'	Stadium: King Abdullah Sports City; Attendance: 7,544; Referee: Bakary Gassama (Gambia)

31 August 2019 2	Al-Ettifaq	1–2	Al-Ahli	Dammam
18:40	Kiss (yellow card) 28'; Sliti 55'; Al-Hazaa (yellow card) 90+4'	Report	Al Somah 45+2'; Al-Khabrani (yellow card) 54' (yellow-red card) 83'; Ghareeb 85'	Stadium: Prince Mohamed bin Fahd Stadium; Attendance: 10,010; Referee: Danny Makkelie (Netherlands)

14 September 2019 3	Al-Ahli	1–2	Al-Wehda	Jeddah
20:35	Al-Fatil (yellow card) 42'; Al-Mogahwi (yellow card) 90+3'; A. Asiri (yellow card) 90+5'; Al Somah 90+6'	Report	Niakaté 8', 45+1'; Al-Khulaif (yellow card) 18'; Botía (yellow card) 26'; Al-Zori (yellow card) 49'; Goodwin (yellow card) 88'	Stadium: King Abdullah Sports City; Attendance: 12,688; Referee: Matej Jug (Slovenia)

21 September 2019 4	Al-Fateh	0–2	Al-Ahli	Al-Hasa
18:20	Al-Fuhaid (yellow card) 47'	Report	Djaniny 6'; Al Somah 22'; Al-Mousa (yellow card) 51'; Hassoun (yellow card) 55'; A. Asiri (yellow card) 63'	Stadium: Prince Abdullah bin Jalawi Stadium; Attendance: 14,000; Referee: Serdar Gözübüyük (Netherlands)

27 September 2019 5	Al-Ahli	0–0	Al-Nassr	Jeddah
20:15	Hindi (yellow card) 84'	Report	Hamdallah (yellow card) 40'; Yahya (yellow card) 54'; Maicon (yellow card) 71'	Stadium: King Abdullah Sports City; Attendance: 30,198; Referee: Artur Soares Dias (Portugal)

5 October 2019 6	Al-Fayha	0–3	Al-Ahli	Al Majma'ah
18:20	Assis (yellow card) 20'; Al-Barakah (yellow card) 55'	Report	Al-Mousa (yellow card) 13'; Djaniny 23'; Hindi 45+5'; Al Somah 52'	Stadium: Al Majma'ah Sports City; Attendance: 3,993; Referee: Bobby Madden (Scotland)

18 October 2019 7	Al-Ahli	3–1	Al-Taawoun	Jeddah
20:00	A. Asiri 22'; Lucas Lima (yellow card) 39'; Djaniny 44'; Al-Mogahwi (yellow card) 50'; Sarić (yellow card) 52'; Al Somah 70'; Al-Owais (yellow card) 84'	Report	Héldon 10'; Assiri (yellow card) 23'; Al-Mousa (yellow card) 33'	Stadium: King Abdullah Sports City; Attendance: 9,431; Referee: Jorge Sousa (Portugal)

26 October 2019 8	Al-Hazem	2–1	Al-Ahli	Ar Rass
18:10	Fettouhi (yellow card) 34'; Al-Zubaidi (yellow card) 42'; Muralha (red card) 45+3'; Tandia 50'; Hamzi 87'	Report	Lucas Lima (yellow card) 34'; Belaïli (yellow card) 41'; A. Asiri (yellow card) 60'; Hindi 70'; Al-Mowalad (yellow card) 90+4'	Stadium: Al-Hazem Club Stadium; Attendance: 3,391; Referee: Ivan Bebek (Croatia)

31 October 2019 9	Al-Ahli	2–1	Al-Ittihad	Jeddah
19:50	A. Asiri 13'; Sarić (yellow card) 18'; Al Somah 37'; Al-Owais (yellow card) 76'	Report	Abdulhamid (yellow card) 33'; Al-Sahafi 71'; Al-Bishi (yellow card) 90'	Stadium: King Abdullah Sports City; Attendance: 29,724; Referee: Artur Soares Dias (Portugal)

23 November 2019 10	Al-Ahli	3–1	Al-Faisaly	Jeddah
19:40	Djaniny 27', 90+5'; Hindi 45+6'; Souza (yellow card) 55'	Report	Qassem 90+4'	Stadium: King Abdullah Sports City; Attendance: 7,964; Referee: Matej Jug (Slovenia)

19 December 2019 12	Al-Ahli	5–1	Damac	Jeddah
19:50	Djaniny 9', 58'; Al-Mogahwi 13'; Al-Bakr (yellow card) 40'; Lucas Lima 45', (yellow card) 60'; Al-Asmari 90+2'	Report	Hadraf 36'; Abousaban (yellow card) 84'	Stadium: King Abdullah Sports City; Attendance: 6,325; Referee: Turki Al-Khudhayr

28 December 2019 13	Al-Shabab	1–0	Al-Ahli	Riyadh
17:50	Asprilla 27'; Sharahili (yellow card) 28'; N'Diaye (yellow card) 60'	Report	Al-Mowalad (yellow card) 74'; Souza (yellow card) 87'; Al-Asmari (yellow card) 89'	Stadium: Prince Faisal bin Fahd Stadium; Attendance: 11,746; Referee: Ovidiu Hațegan (Romania)

7 January 2020 11	Al-Hilal	3–1	Al-Ahli	Riyadh
20:00	Al-Faraj (yellow card) 25'; Al-Dawsari 37'; Kanno (yellow card) 42'; Al-Breik (yellow card) 66'; Gomis 70'; Al-Bulaihi 90'	Report	Asiri (yellow card) 44'; Al Somah 45'; Belaïli (yellow card) 73'; Sarić (yellow card) 78'	Stadium: King Saud University Stadium; Attendance: 21,543; Referee: Szymon Marciniak (Poland)

13 January 2020 14	Al-Ahli	3–1	Abha	Jeddah
20:05	Djaniny 20'; Al Somah 35' (pen.), 83'; Souza (yellow card) 56'	Report	Andriatsima 26'; Al-Nabit (yellow card) 31'; Tahrat (yellow card) 34'	Stadium: King Abdullah Sports City; Attendance: 12,055; Referee: Sultan Al-Harbi

23 January 2020 15	Al-Raed	1–2	Al-Ahli	Buraidah
20:10	Al-Amri (yellow card) 38'; Fouzair 66'; Al-Rehaili (yellow card) 71'	Report	Al-Khabrani (yellow card) 15'; Djaniny (yellow card) 59'; Al Somah 84', 85'; Souza (yellow card) 90+4'	Stadium: King Abdullah Sport City Stadium; Attendance: 4,148; Referee: Shukri Al-Hanfoush

1 February 2020 16	Al-Adalah	1–1	Al-Ahli	Al-Hasa
15:25	Biteghé 30', (yellow card) 84'; Andria (yellow card) 51'; Mandaw (yellow card) 84'	Report	Al-Khabrani (yellow card) 18'; Al-Moasher 38'; Lucas Lima (red card) 84'	Stadium: Prince Abdullah bin Jalawi Stadium; Attendance: 15,304; Referee: Allard Lindhout (Netherlands)

6 February 2020 17	Al-Ahli	3–2	Al-Ettifaq	Mecca
20:20	Al-Mowalad (yellow card) 30'; Al-Mogahwi 79', (yellow card) 90'; Belaïli 85' (pen.), 90+4' (pen.), (yellow card) 90+5'	Report	Al-Robeai (yellow card) 34'; Souza 37'; Kiss 68' (pen.); Al-Qumaizi (yellow card) 78'; Al-Kwikbi (yellow card) 84'; Azaro (yellow card) 90'; Yambéré (yellow card) 90+4'; M'Bolhi (yellow card) 90+4'	Stadium: King Abdul Aziz Stadium; Attendance: 5,018; Referee: Turki Al-Khudhayr

14 February 2020 18	Al-Wehda	2–0	Al-Ahli	Mecca
20:25	Luisinho 28'; Niakaté 82'; Botía (yellow card) 84'	Report		Stadium: King Abdul Aziz Stadium; Attendance: 10,807; Referee: Slavko Vinčić (Slovenia)

21 February 2020 19	Al-Ahli	0–1	Al-Fateh	Jeddah
20:30	Asiri (yellow card) 35'; Abdulghani (yellow card) 81'; Al-Moasher (yellow card) 84'	Report	Bendebka 45+1'; Al-Zaqaan (yellow card) 89'	Stadium: King Abdullah Sports City; Attendance: 8,930; Referee: Majed Al-Shamrani

27 February 2020 20	Al-Nassr	2–2	Al-Ahli	Riyadh
20:40	Giuliano 58', 66'; Al-Ghanam (yellow card) 69'; Al-Amri (yellow card) 74'	Report	Petros 32' (o.g.); Al Somah 43' (pen.); Bassas (yellow card) 51'; Marin (yellow card) 52'; Abdulghani (yellow card) 67'; Belaïli (yellow card) 77'; Djaniny (yellow card) 90'	Stadium: Prince Faisal bin Fahd Stadium; Attendance: 13,069; Referee: Damir Skomina (Slovenia)

6 March 2020 21	Al-Ahli	1–0	Al-Fayha	Jeddah
20:40	Al Somah 87'; Djaniny (yellow card) 88'	Report	Al-Sobhi (yellow card) 33'	Stadium: King Abdullah Sports City; Attendance: 10,836; Referee: Slavko Vinčić (Slovenia)

12 March 2020 22	Al-Taawoun	1–0	Al-Ahli	Buraidah
20:40	Petrolina 10'; Cássio (yellow card) 83'; Kadesh (yellow card) 90+4'	Report	Souza (yellow card) 69'	Stadium: King Abdullah Sport City Stadium; Attendance: 0 (Note: Matches from 7 March and onwards will be played behind closed doors due to concerns over the coronavirus outbreak.); Referee: Srđan Jovanović (Serbia)

4 August 2020 23	Al-Ahli	4–2	Al-Hazem	Jeddah
21:15	Ghareeb 3'; Lucas Lima (yellow card) 22'; Al Somah 50'; H. Asiri 86', (yellow card) 86' (yellow-red card) 90+2'; Al-Harbi 88'	Report	Al-Qeshtah (yellow card) 57'; Strandberg 65'; Cafú 68', (yellow card) 90+1'	Stadium: King Abdullah Sports City; Attendance: 0 Referee: Shukri Al-Hanfoush

9 August 2020 24	Al-Ittihad	1–2	Al-Ahli	Jeddah
21:00	Abdulhamid (yellow card) 20'; Al-Malki 41'; Al-Shamrani (yellow card) 57'; Al-Sumairi (yellow card) 62'	Report	Al Somah 30', 64', (yellow card) 39'; Sarić (yellow card) 45+1'	Stadium: King Abdullah Sports City; Attendance: 0 Referee: Srđan Jovanović (Serbia)

15 August 2020 25	Al-Faisaly	2–0	Al-Ahli	Al Majma'ah
19:10	El Jebli 27' (pen.); Hyland (yellow card) 66'; Kaabi 73'	Report	Al-Harbi (yellow card) 56'; Hindi (yellow card) 82'	Stadium: Al Majma'ah Sports City; Attendance: 0 Referee: Gediminas Mažeika (Lithuania)

20 August 2020 26	Al-Ahli	2–1	Al-Hilal	Jeddah
20:55	Al Somah 5'; Al-Asmari (yellow card) 45+1'; Sarić (yellow card) 57'; A. Asiri 74'; Al-Moasher (yellow card) 76'; Abo Shararah (yellow card) 90+5'	Report	Jahfali (yellow card) 7'; Al-Bulaihi 62'; Carrillo (yellow card) 72'; Cuéllar (yellow card) 90+1'	Stadium: King Abdullah Sports City; Attendance: 0 Referee: Andrés Cunha (Uruguay)

25 August 2020 27	Damac	2–1	Al-Ahli	Abha
19:05	Zelaya (yellow card) 14', (goal) 24' (pen.), 38'; Ayadi (yellow card) 52'	Report	Al Somah 60'; Al-Khabrani (yellow card) 66' (yellow-red card) 75'	Stadium: Prince Sultan bin Abdul Aziz Stadium; Attendance: 0 Referee: Gediminas Mažeika (Lithuania)

30 August 2020 28	Al-Ahli	1–1	Al-Shabab	Jeddah
20:40	Al-Majhad (yellow card) 24'; Al-Asmari 39'; Sarić (yellow card) 53'; Lucas Lima (yellow card) 55'; H. Asiri (yellow card) 90+9'	Report	Guanca 21'; Al-Hamdan (yellow card) 28'	Stadium: King Abdullah Sports City; Attendance: 0 Referee: Aleksei Kulbakov (Belarus)

4 September 2020 29	Abha	2–1	Al-Ahli	Abha
20:35 AST (UTC+3)	Bguir 32' (pen.), 90+3'; Aashor (yellow card) 45+4'; Atouchi (yellow card) 80'; Al-Najei (yellow card) 88'	Report	Hassoun 80'	Stadium: Prince Sultan bin Abdul Aziz Stadium; Attendance: 0 Referee: Khaled Al-Teris

9 September 2020 30	Al-Ahli	2–0	Al-Raed	Jeddah
20:35	Sarić (yellow card) 24'; Al-Asmari (yellow card) 42'; Al-Moasher 55'; Hassoun (yellow card) 66'; Abdulghani (yellow card) 77'; Al Somah 79'	Report	Al-Showaish (yellow card) 90+1'	Stadium: King Abdullah Sports City; Attendance: 0 Referee: Vítor Ferreira (Portugal)

=== King Cup ===
All times are local, AST (UTC+3).

5 November 2019 Round of 64	Al-Ahli	4–1	Al-Jandal	Jeddah
20:15	Belaïli 45+3'; Al-Khabrani (yellow card) 57'; Al-Moasher 58'; Al-Mogahwi 60'; Lucas Lima 77'	Report	Kassola (yellow card) 7'; Faleh 22'; Nofal (yellow card) 90+1'	Stadium: King Abdullah Sports City; Attendance: 2,462; Referee: Mohammed Al-Hoaish

6 December 2019 Round of 32	Al-Nojoom	1–3	Al-Ahli	Al-Hasa
17:25	Al-Soraihi (yellow card) 49'; Al-Ammari 83' (pen.)	Report	Belaïli 3', 60'; Sarić (yellow card) 40'; Ghareeb 85'	Stadium: Prince Abdullah bin Jalawi Stadium; Referee: Abdullah Dhafer

2 January 2020 Round of 16	Al-Fayha	0–1	Al-Ahli	Al Majma'ah
18:00		Report	Al Somah 82'	Stadium: Al Majma'ah Sports City; Referee: Bas Nijhuis (Netherlands)

18 January 2020 Quarter-finals	Al-Wehda	1–2	Al-Ahli	Mecca
18:40	Al-Zori 8'; Bakshween (yellow card) 23'; Chaves (yellow card) 29'; Goodwin (yellow card) 38'; Al-Qarni (yellow card) 41'; Al-Saiari (yellow card) 59'; Al-Nemer (yellow card) 90+3'	Report	Al Somah 26' (pen.), (yellow card) 54'; Al-Mowalad (yellow card) 27'; Marin 68'; Souza (yellow card) 73'	Stadium: King Abdul Aziz Stadium; Referee: Ivan Bebek (Croatia)

27 October 2020 Semi-finals	Al-Ahli	1–2	Al-Nassr	Jeddah
20:30	Al Somah 19'; Fejsa (yellow card) 33'; Fettouhi (yellow card) 41'; Hassoun (yellow card) 46'; Al-Moasher (yellow card) 60'; Hawsawi (yellow card) 82'	Report	Martínez (yellow card) 42', (goal) 85'; Petros 45+3'; Al-Khalaf (yellow card) 80'	Stadium: King Abdullah Sports City; Attendance: 0 Referee: Andrés Rojas (Colombia)

=== 2019 AFC Champions League ===
==== Knockout phase ====
===== Round of 16 =====
6 August 2019 First leg	Al-Ahli (Saudi Arabia)	2–4	(Saudi Arabia) Al-Hilal	Jeddah, Saudi Arabia
19:40 UTC+3	Al-Khabrani (yellow card) 2'; Al Somah 6', (yellow card) 61'; Djaniny 39'; Aleksić (yellow card) 45+2'; Souza (yellow card) 90'	Live Report; Stats Report	Gomis 15', 48', 65'; Al-Bulaihi (yellow card) 34'; Al-Dawsari (yellow card) 36'; Al-Hafith 81'; Otayf (yellow card) 90'	Stadium: King Abdullah Sports City; Attendance: 48,094; Referee: Ahmed Al-Kaf (Oman)

13 August 2019 Second leg	Al-Hilal (Saudi Arabia)	0–1 (4–3 agg.)	(Saudi Arabia) Al-Ahli	Riyadh, Saudi Arabia
20:30 UTC+3	Al-Dawsari (yellow card) 89'; Bahebri (yellow card) 90'; Gomis (yellow card) 90+3'	Live Report; Stats Report	Al-Fatil (yellow card) 37'; Asiri 42'; Souza (yellow card) 55'; Al-Moasher (yellow card) 68'; Al-Owais (yellow card) 90+3'	Stadium: King Saud University Stadium; Attendance: 22,706; Referee: Ma Ning (China)

=== 2020 AFC Champions League ===
==== Play-off Round ====
28 January 2020 Play-off round	Al-Ahli (Saudi Arabia)	1–0	(Tajikistan) Istiklol	Jeddah, Saudi Arabia
20:30 UTC+3	Belaïli 90+1' (pen.)	Report	Rakhimov (yellow card) 35'; Milić (yellow card) 45+1'; Svezhov (yellow card) 57' (yellow-red card) 89'; Dzhalilov (yellow card) 63'; Davlatmir (yellow card) 90'	Stadium: King Abdullah Sports City; Referee: Sivakorn Pu-udom (Thailand)

==== Group stage ====
The draw for the group stage was held on 10 December 2019 at the AFC House in Kuala Lumpur, Malaysia. Al-Ahli were drawn with Iraqi champions Al-Shorta, UAE side Al-Wahda, and Iranian side Esteghlal.

Pos	Team	Pld	W	D	L	GF	GA	GD	Pts	Qualification	AHL	EST	SHO	WAH
1	(Saudi Arabia) Al-Ahli	4	2	0	2	4	6	−2	6	Advance to knockout stage	—	2–1	1–0	~~20 Sep~~
2	(Iran) Esteghlal	4	1	2	1	6	4	+2	5	Advance to knockout stage	3–0	—	1–1	~~17 Sep~~
3	(Iraq) Al-Shorta	4	1	2	1	4	4	0	5		2–1	1–1	—	~~0–1~~
4	(United Arab Emirates) Al-Wahda	0	0	0	0	0	0	0	0	Withdrew, results expunged (Note: Al-Wahda were unable to travel to Qatar to play the final four matches of the group stage due to several team members having tested positive for COVID-19. They were considered to have withdrawn from the competition, and their results were expunged.)	~~1–1~~	~~14 Sep~~	~~23 Sep~~	—

Source: AFC
Rules for classification: Tiebreakers
Notes:

10 February 2020 1	Al-Wahda (United Arab Emirates)	Voided (1–1)	(Saudi Arabia) Al-Ahli	Abu Dhabi, United Arab Emirates
19:35 UTC+4	Al-Korbi (yellow card) 66'; Rim Chang-woo 90'	Live Report; Stats Report	Asiri 60'; Al-Mosailem (yellow card) 90+3'	Stadium: Al Nahyan Stadium; Attendance: 7,124; Referee: Ahmed Al-Kaf (Oman)

17 February 2020 2	Al-Ahli (Saudi Arabia)	2–1	(Iran) Esteghlal	Kuwait City, Kuwait (Note: Matches between teams from Iran and Saudi Arabia will be played on neutral venues due to deterioration of Iran–Saudi Arabia relations.)
18:30 UTC+3	Al-Moasher 17' (pen.), 29', (yellow card) 90+1'; Al-Majhad (yellow card) 27'; Al-Asmari (yellow card) 34'; Hindi (yellow card) 52'	Live Report; Stats Report	Cheshmi (yellow card) 1'; Motahari 22'	Stadium: Jaber Al-Ahmad International Stadium; Attendance: 6,740; Referee: Ko Hyung-jin (South Korea)

14 September 2020 (Note: On 9 July 2020, AFC announced new schedule for 2020 AFC Champions League group stage. On 16 July 2020, AFC announced that Qatar would host 2020 AFC Champions League in the West region from the group stage to the semi-finals.) 3	Al-Ahli (Saudi Arabia)	1–0	(Iraq) Al-Shorta	Doha, Qatar
18:00 UTC+3	Hassoun (yellow card) 46'; Marin 87'	Live Report; Stats Report	Mhawi (yellow card) 25' (yellow-red card) 45+1'; Mohammed (yellow card) 90+2'	Stadium: Khalifa International Stadium; Attendance: 0 Referee: Nawaf Shukralla (Bahrain)

17 September 2020 4	Al-Shorta (Iraq)	2–1	(Saudi Arabia) Al-Ahli	Doha, Qatar
18:00 UTC+3	Natiq 14', (yellow card) 22'; Fayyadh 65'	Live Report; Stats Report	Lima (yellow card) 28'; Al-Majhad 56'	Stadium: Khalifa International Stadium; Attendance: 0 Referee: Sherzod Kasimov (Uzbekistan)

20 September 2020 5	Al-Ahli (Saudi Arabia)	Cancelled	(United Arab Emirates) Al-Wahda
--:-- UTC+3		Live Report; Stats Report

23 September 2020 6	Esteghlal (Iran)	3–0	(Saudi Arabia) Al-Ahli	Al Wakrah, Qatar
18:00 UTC+3	Ghayedi 29'; Milić (yellow card) 30'; Karimi 38'; Diabaté 54'	Live Report; Stats Report	Abdulghani (yellow card) 49'	Stadium: Al Janoub Stadium; Attendance: 0 Referee: Adham Makhadmeh (Jordan)

==== Knockout phase ====
26 September 2020 Round of 16	Al-Ahli (Saudi Arabia)	1–1 (a.e.t.) (4–3 p)	(United Arab Emirates) Shabab Al-Ahli	Al Wakrah, Qatar
16:40 UTC+3	Al-Fatil (yellow card) 23'; Al-Asmari (yellow card) 50'; Al Somah 54' (pen.); Hassoun (yellow card) 95'	Live Report; Stats Report	Ganiev 28'; Hussain (yellow card) 38'; Marzooq (yellow card) 74'; Khamis (yellow card) 119'	Stadium: Al Janoub Stadium; Attendance: 0 Referee: Nawaf Shukralla (Bahrain)
	Penalties
	Abdulghani (penalty scored); Lima (penalty scored); Ghareeb (penalty scored); Hawsawi (penalty scored); Al Somah (penalty missed)		(penalty missed) Khalil; (penalty scored) Jaber; (penalty scored) Ganiev; (penalty scored) Al-Bloushi; (penalty missed) Al-Naqbi

30 September 2020 Quarter-finals	Al-Nassr (Saudi Arabia)	2–0	(Saudi Arabia) Al-Ahli	Doha, Qatar
16:40 UTC+3	Martínez 13'; Asiri 55'; Al-Buraikan (yellow card) 88'	Live Report; Stats Report	Al-Majhad (yellow card) 6'; Hawsawi (yellow card) 78'	Stadium: Jassim Bin Hamad Stadium; Attendance: 0 Referee: Sivakorn Pu-udom (Thailand)

== Statistics ==
=== Appearances ===
Last updated on 30 September 2020.

No.	Pos	Nat	Player	Total		Pro League		King Cup		2019 ACL		2020 ACL	
No.	Pos	Nat	Player	Apps	Goals	Apps	Goals	Apps	Goals	Apps	Goals	Apps	Goals
Goalkeepers
1	GK	(Saudi Arabia) KSA	Yasser Al-Mosailem	23	0	16+1	0	3	0	0	0	3	0
33	GK	(Saudi Arabia) KSA	Mohammed Al-Owais	21	0	13	0	1	0	2	0	5	0
44	GK	(Saudi Arabia) KSA	Mohammed Al Rubaie	1	0	0+1	0	0	0	0	0	0	0
66	GK	(Saudi Arabia) KSA	Basem Atallah	1	0	1	0	0	0	0	0	0	0
Defenders
2	DF	(Saudi Arabia) KSA	Saeed Al-Mowalad	27	0	14+4	0	3	0	1	0	2+3	0
3	DF	(Saudi Arabia) KSA	Mohammed Al-Fatil	27	0	14+1	0	3	0	2	0	5+2	0
5	DF	(Saudi Arabia) KSA	Mohammed Al-Khabrani	28	0	22	0	3	0	2	0	1	0
13	DF	(Saudi Arabia) KSA	Yazeed Al-Bakr	7	0	3+2	0	0+1	0	0+1	0	0	0
18	DF	(Saudi Arabia) KSA	Talal Al-Absi	2	0	0	0	0	0	0	0	2	0
23	DF	(Saudi Arabia) KSA	Abdullah Hassoun	28	1	14+5	1	1+1	0	1	0	6	0
24	DF	(Saudi Arabia) KSA	Hussein Abdulghani	19	0	9+1	0	0	0	2	0	4+3	0
25	DF	(Saudi Arabia) KSA	Motaz Hawsawi	14	0	6+2	0	0	0	0	0	5+1	0
28	DF	(Saudi Arabia) KSA	Ahmed Al-Nakhli	1	0	0	0	0	0	0	0	0+1	0
31	DF	(Saudi Arabia) KSA	Hani Al-Sebyani	1	0	0	0	0	0	0	0	1	0
37	DF	(Saudi Arabia) KSA	Abdulbasit Hindi	19	3	12+1	3	1	0	0	0	5	0
60	DF	(Brazil) BRA	Lucas Lima	33	2	23	1	3+1	1	0	0	6	0
70	DF	(Saudi Arabia) KSA	Mohammed Bassas	3	0	1+2	0	0	0	0	0	0	0
Midfielders
7	MF	(Saudi Arabia) KSA	Salman Al-Moasher	35	5	15+7	2	2+2	1	2	0	6+1	2
8	MF	(Bosnia and Herzegovina) BIH	Elvis Sarić	28	0	22+2	0	3+1	0	0	0	0	0
11	MF	(Saudi Arabia) KSA	Housain Al-Mogahwi	26	3	9+6	2	2+1	1	0+2	0	2+4	0
15	MF	(Saudi Arabia) KSA	Mohammed Al-Majhad	13	1	5+3	0	0	0	0	0	5	1
16	MF	(Saudi Arabia) KSA	Nooh Al-Mousa	10	0	5+2	0	1	0	0+1	0	0+1	0
17	MF	(Germany) GER	Marko Marin	16	2	7+2	0	0+1	1	0	0	6	1
19	MF	(Algeria) ALG	Youcef Belaïli	19	6	12+1	2	4	3	0	0	1+1	1
29	MF	(Saudi Arabia) KSA	Abdulrahman Ghareeb	29	3	11+8	2	1+1	1	0+1	0	3+4	0
32	MF	(Saudi Arabia) KSA	Hassan Al-Qeed	1	0	0	0	0	0	0	0	1	0
35	MF	(Saudi Arabia) KSA	Yousef Al-Harbi	16	1	3+7	1	1	0	0	0	2+3	0
38	MF	(Saudi Arabia) KSA	Ali Al-Shaikhi	1	0	0+1	0	0	0	0	0	0	0
39	MF	(Saudi Arabia) KSA	Fahad Majrashi	5	0	0+4	0	0	0	0	0	0+1	0
40	MF	(Saudi Arabia) KSA	Ali Al-Asmari	28	2	13+6	2	0+2	0	1	0	6	0
Forwards
9	FW	(Syria) SYR	Omar Al Somah	33	23	22+3	19	2	2	1+1	1	4	1
14	FW	(Saudi Arabia) KSA	Muhannad Assiri	2	0	0+2	0	0	0	0	0	0	0
20	FW	(Saudi Arabia) KSA	Ahmed Bassas	1	0	0	0	0	0	0	0	0+1	0
34	FW	(Saudi Arabia) KSA	Mazen Abo Shararah	12	0	1+7	0	0	0	0	0	3+1	0
45	FW	(Saudi Arabia) KSA	Haitham Asiri	7	1	0+2	1	0	0	0	0	2+3	0
Players sent out on loan this season
4	DF	(Saudi Arabia) KSA	Khaled Al-Barakah	1	0	0	0	1	0	0	0	0	0
27	MF	(Saudi Arabia) KSA	Sultan Mendash	2	0	1+1	0	0	0	0	0	0	0
Player who made an appearance this season but have left the club
6	MF	(Brazil) BRA	Souza	25	0	18+1	0	3	0	2	0	1	0
10	MF	(Saudi Arabia) KSA	Abdulfattah Asiri	24	5	16+3	3	2	0	2	1	1	1
21	FW	(Cape Verde) CPV	Djaniny	27	9	21+1	8	3	0	2	1	0	0
22	MF	(Serbia) SRB	Danijel Aleksić	3	1	1	1	0	0	2	0	0	0
47	MF	(Saudi Arabia) KSA	Mustafa Bassas	1	0	0+1	0	0	0	0	0	0	0
87	DF	(Bosnia and Herzegovina) BIH	Ervin Zukanović	4	0	3	0	1	0	0	0	0	0

=== Goalscorers ===
Rank	No.	Pos	Nat	Name	Pro League	King Cup	2019 ACL	2020 ACL	Total
1	9	FW	(Syria)	Omar Al Somah	19	2	1	1	23
2	21	FW	(Cape Verde)	Djaniny	8	0	1	0	9
3	19	MF	(Algeria)	Youcef Belaïli	2	3	0	1	6
4	7	MF	(Saudi Arabia)	Salman Al-Moasher	2	1	0	2	5
4	10	MF	(Saudi Arabia)	Abdulfattah Asiri	3	0	1	1	5
6	11	MF	(Saudi Arabia)	Housain Al-Mogahwi	2	1	0	0	3
6	29	MF	(Saudi Arabia)	Abdulrahman Ghareeb	2	1	0	0	3
6	37	DF	(Saudi Arabia)	Abdulbasit Hindi	3	0	0	0	3
9	17	MF	(Germany)	Marko Marin	0	1	0	1	2
9	40	MF	(Saudi Arabia)	Ali Al-Asmari	2	0	0	0	2
9	60	DF	(Brazil)	Lucas Lima	1	1	0	0	2
11	15	MF	(Saudi Arabia)	Mohammed Al-Majhad	0	0	0	1	1
11	18	FW	(Saudi Arabia)	Haitham Asiri	1	0	0	0	1
11	22	MF	(Serbia)	Danijel Aleksić	1	0	0	0	1
11	23	DF	(Saudi Arabia)	Abdullah Hassoun	1	0	0	0	1
11	35	MF	(Saudi Arabia)	Yousef Al-Harbi	1	0	0	0	1
Own goal					1	0	0	0	1
Total					49	10	3	7	69

Last Updated: 26 September 2020

=== Assists ===
Rank	No.	Pos	Nat	Name	Pro League	King Cup	2019 ACL	2020 ACL	Total
1	10	MF	(Saudi Arabia)	Abdulfattah Asiri	4	0	2	0	6
1	29	MF	(Saudi Arabia)	Abdulrahman Ghareeb	3	1	0	2	6
3	11	MF	(Saudi Arabia)	Housain Al-Mogahwi	1	3	0	0	4
3	19	MF	(Algeria)	Youcef Belaïli	3	1	0	0	4
5	2	DF	(Saudi Arabia)	Saeed Al-Mowalad	3	0	0	0	3
5	6	MF	(Brazil)	Souza	2	1	0	0	3
5	60	DF	(Brazil)	Lucas Lima	2	1	0	0	3
8	7	MF	(Saudi Arabia)	Salman Al-Moasher	2	0	0	0	2
8	17	MF	(Germany)	Marko Marin	1	0	0	1	2
8	21	FW	(Cape Verde)	Djaniny	2	0	0	0	2
8	24	DF	(Saudi Arabia)	Hussein Abdulghani	2	0	0	0	2
12	5	DF	(Saudi Arabia)	Mohammed Al-Khabrani	1	0	0	0	1
12	14	FW	(Saudi Arabia)	Muhannad Assiri	1	0	0	0	1
12	15	MF	(Saudi Arabia)	Mohammed Al-Majhad	1	0	0	0	1
12	23	DF	(Saudi Arabia)	Abdullah Hassoun	0	0	0	1	1
12	34	FW	(Saudi Arabia)	Mazen Abo Shararah	1	0	0	0	1
12	35	MF	(Saudi Arabia)	Yousef Al-Harbi	1	0	0	0	1
12	40	MF	(Saudi Arabia)	Ali Al-Asmari	1	0	0	0	1
12	45	FW	(Saudi Arabia)	Haitham Asiri	1	0	0	0	1
Total					32	7	2	4	45

Last Updated: 17 September 2020

=== Clean sheets ===
Rank	No.	Pos	Nat	Name	Pro League	King Cup	2019 ACL	2020 ACL	Total
1	33	GK	(Saudi Arabia)	Mohammed Al-Owais	4	0	1	1	6
2	1	GK	(Saudi Arabia)	Yasser Al-Mosailem	1	1	0	1	3
Total					5	1	1	2	9

Last Updated: 14 September 2020
