= 2017–18 Al-Ahli Saudi FC season =

Al-Ahli
2017–18 season
- President: Fahad bin Khalid (until 14 November 2017); Turki bin Mohammed (from 14 November 2017)
- Manager: Serhii Rebrov (until 18 April 2018); Fathi Al-Jabal (from 18 April 2018)
- Stadium: King Abdullah Sports City
- Pro League: 2nd
- King Cup: Semi-finals
- 2017 Champions League: Quarter-finals
- 2018 Champions League: Round of 16
- Top goalscorer: League: Omar Al Somah (11); All: Muhannad Assiri (13)
- Highest home attendance: 43,794 vs Al-Hilal (7 April 2018)
- Lowest home attendance: 4,831 vs Al-Ettifaq (15 December 2017)
- Average home league attendance: 16,650
Home colours	Away colours	Third colours
- All statistics correct as of 14 May 2018.

The 2017–18 season was Al-Ahli's 42nd consecutive season in the top flight of Saudi football and 80th year in existence as a football club. They entered this season looking to rebound from a disappointing 2016–17 campaign, when they finished as runners-up in both the league and King Cup. Al-Ahli also participated in the King Cup, and both the 2017 and 2018 editions of the AFC Champions League. The season covered the period from 1 July 2017 to 30 June 2018.

== Players ==
=== Squad information ===
As of 25 January 2018

Note: Flags indicate national team as defined under FIFA eligibility rules; some limited exceptions apply. Players may hold more than one non-FIFA nationality.

No.	Pos.	Nation	Player
1	GK	KSA	Yasser Al-Mosailem (vice-captain)
2	DF	KSA	Ali Al-Zubaidi
4	MF	KSA	Waleed Bakshween
5	MF	AUS	Mark Milligan
6	DF	KSA	Mohammed Al Fatil
7	MF	KSA	Salman Al-Moasher
8	MF	KSA	Taisir Al-Jassim (Captain)
9	FW	SYR	Omar Al Soma
10	MF	GRE	Giannis Fetfatzidis
11	MF	KSA	Housain Al-Mogahwi
14	FW	KSA	Muhannad Assiri
15	MF	KSA	Saleh Al-Amri
17	MF	KSA	Ayman Al-Khulaif
18	MF	KSA	Ali Al-Asmari
19	MF	BRA	Claudemir
20	MF	TUN	Mohamed Ben Amor (on loan from Étoile du Sahel)
21	DF	KSA	Ageel Balghaith
23	DF	KSA	Saeed Al-Mowalad

No.	Pos.	Nation	Player
24	MF	KSA	Ali Awagi
25	DF	KSA	Motaz Hawsawi (4th captain)
26	MF	KSA	Abdulmohsen Al-Subhi
27	MF	KSA	Hamdan Al-Shamrani
29	FW	KSA	Abdulrahman Ghareeb
31	DF	KSA	Mansoor Al-Harbi (3rd captain)
32	DF	KSA	Faisal Darisi
33	GK	KSA	Mohammed Al-Owais
35	MF	KSA	Yousef Al-Harbi
36	GK	KSA	Raghid Al-Najjar
37	DF	KSA	Abdullah Hassoun
41	FW	KSA	Mansour Al-Muwallad
42	MF	BRA	Leonardo
45	MF	KSA	Abdulfattah Asiri
50	MF	KSA	Abdullah Majrashi
66	GK	KSA	Basem Atallah
77	DF	KSA	Amiri Kurdi
88	MF	EGY	Moamen Zakaria (on loan from Al Ahly)

=== AFC Champions League squad ===
Note: Flags indicate national team as defined under FIFA eligibility rules; some limited exceptions apply. Players may hold more than one non-FIFA nationality.

No.	Pos.	Nation	Player
1	GK	KSA	Yasser Al Mosailem (vice-captain)
4	MF	KSA	Waleed Bakshween
5	MF	AUS	Mark Milligan
6	DF	KSA	Mohammed Al Fatil
7	MF	KSA	Salman Al-Moasher
8	MF	KSA	Taisir Al-Jassim (Captain)
9	FW	SYR	Omar Al Soma
10	MF	GRE	Giannis Fetfatzidis
11	MF	KSA	Housain Al-Mogahwi
14	FW	KSA	Muhannad Assiri
15	MF	KSA	Saleh Al-Amri
18	MF	KSA	Ali Al-Asmari
19	MF	BRA	Claudemir
21	DF	KSA	Ageel Balghaith
23	DF	KSA	Saeed Al-Mowalad
24	MF	KSA	Ali Awagi

No.	Pos.	Nation	Player
25	DF	KSA	Motaz Hawsawi (4th captain)
27	MF	KSA	Hamdan Al-Shamrani
29	FW	KSA	Abdulrahman Ghareeb
31	DF	KSA	Mansoor Al-Harbi (3rd captain)
32	DF	KSA	Faisal Darisi
33	GK	KSA	Mohammed Al-Owais
35	MF	KSA	Yousef Al-Harbi
36	GK	KSA	Raghid Al-Najjar
37	DF	KSA	Abdullah Hassoun
45	MF	KSA	Abdulfattah Asiri
50	MF	KSA	Abdullah Majrashi
66	GK	KSA	Basem Atallah
77	DF	KSA	Amiri Kurdi
88	MF	EGY	Moamen Zakaria (on loan from Al Ahly)

Source: 2018 AFC Champions League squad

== Transfers ==
=== In ===
==== Summer ====
No.	Pos	Player	Transferred From	Fee	Date	Source
49	LM	(Saudi Arabia) Ahmed Al-Zain	(Saudi Arabia) Al-Taawoun	Undisclosed	21 June 2017	
19	DM	(Brazil) Claudemir	(Belgium) Club Brugge	€2,700,000	18 July 2017	
28	CB	(Nigeria) Godfrey Oboabona	(Turkey) Çaykur Rizespor	Free	21 July 2017	
33	GK	(Saudi Arabia) Mohammed Al-Owais	(Saudi Arabia) Al-Shabab	Free	26 July 2017	
42	LM	(Brazil) Leonardo	(Serbia) Partizan	€4,200,000	3 August 2017	

==== Winter ====
No.	Pos	Player	Transferred From	Fee	Date	Source
5	DM	(Australia) Mark Milligan	(Australia) Melbourne Victory	Undisclosed	28 January 2018	
	AM	(Saudi Arabia) Ahmed Basaeed	Unattached	Free	2 February 2018	

=== Out ===
==== Summer ====
No.	Pos	Player	Transferred To	Fee	Date	Source
26	CB	(Saudi Arabia) Mohammed Aman	(Saudi Arabia) Al-Fateh	Free	5 July 2017	
34	ST	(Saudi Arabia) Sumayhan Al-Nabit	(Saudi Arabia) Ohod	Free	17 July 2017	
28	LB	(Saudi Arabia) Abdulelah Bokhari	(Saudi Arabia) Al-Ettifaq	Free	30 July 2017	
55	DM	(Iraq) Saad Abdul-Amir	(Saudi Arabia) Al-Shabab	Free	9 August 2017	
	ST	(Saudi Arabia) Mostafa Al-Musawi	(Saudi Arabia) Al-Khaleej	Free	19 August 2017	
5	DM	(Saudi Arabia) Fahad Hamad	(Saudi Arabia) Al-Faisaly	Free	25 August 2017	
	CM	(Saudi Arabia) Omar Al-Zayni	(Saudi Arabia) Hajer	Free	25 August 2017	

==== Winter ====
No.	Pos	Player	Transferred To	Fee	Date	Source
	AM	(Saudi Arabia) Yasser Al-Fahmi	(Saudi Arabia) Al-Batin	Free	16 January 2018	
28	CB	(Nigeria) Godfrey Oboabona	Released	Free	2 February 2018	

=== Loan in ===
==== Winter ====
No.	Pos	Player	Loaned From	Start	End	Source
88	AM	(Egypt) Moamen Zakaria	(Egypt) Al Ahly	4 January 2017	30 June 2018	
20	DM	(Tunisia) Mohamed Ben Amor	(Tunisia) Étoile du Sahel	25 January 2017	30 June 2018	

=== Loan out ===
==== Summer ====
No.	Pos	Player	Loaned To	Start	End	Source
80	DM	(Saudi Arabia) Ryan Al-Mousa	(Saudi Arabia) Al-Taawoun	9 July 2017	30 June 2018	
22	GK	(Saudi Arabia) Ahmed Al-Rehaili	(Saudi Arabia) Al-Raed	12 July 2017	30 June 2018	
30	CB	(Saudi Arabia) Saeed Al-Robeai	(Saudi Arabia) Al-Faisaly	1 August 2017	30 June 2018	
	CB	(Saudi Arabia) Abdullah Al-Khateeb	(Saudi Arabia) Al-Khaleej	6 August 2017	30 June 2018	
35	DM	(Saudi Arabia) Rayan Al-Harbi	(Saudi Arabia) Al-Tai	8 August 2017	30 June 2018	
	CB	(Saudi Arabia) Hamed Al-Sherif	(Saudi Arabia) Hajer	16 August 2017	30 June 2018	
20	RM	(Saudi Arabia) Islam Seraj	(Saudi Arabia) Al-Faisaly	23 August 2017	30 June 2018	
40	RM	(Saudi Arabia) Raed Al-Ghamdi	(Saudi Arabia) Ohod	8 September 2017	30 June 2018	

==== Winter ====
No.	Pos	Player	Loaned To	Start	End	Source
13	LB	(Egypt) Mohamed Abdel-Shafy	(Saudi Arabia) Al-Fateh	4 January 2018	30 June 2018	
47	RM	(Saudi Arabia) Mustafa Bassas	(Saudi Arabia) Ohod	22 January 2018	30 June 2018	
49	LM	(Saudi Arabia) Ahmed Al-Zain	(Saudi Arabia) Al-Fayha	29 January 2018	30 June 2018	

== Pre-season and friendlies ==
13 July 2017 Friendly	Al-Ahli (Saudi Arabia)	12–0	(Austria) Stainach-Grimming	Stainach, Austria
18:30 WET	Al-Somah; Al-Mogahwi; Al-Zain; Al-Moasher; Al-Robeai; Assiri; Asiri; Bassas	Report		Stadium: Stainach Stadium

14 July 2017 Friendly	Al-Ahli (Saudi Arabia)	3–1	(Hungary) Budafoki	Rottenmann, Austria
17:30 WET	Al-Zubaidi; Al-Fatil; Al-Somah	Report		Stadium: Rottenmann Stadium

18 July 2017 Friendly	Al-Ahli (Saudi Arabia)	2–1	(Austria) Bischofshofen	Bischofshofen, Austria
18:00 WET	Bassas; Al-Somah	Report		Stadium: Bischofshofen Stadium

19 July 2017 Friendly	Udinese Calcio (Italy)	4–1	(Saudi Arabia) Al-Ahli	Gmünd, Austria
18:00 WET	Perica 13'; Lasagna 30', 71'; Ewandro 77'	Report	Al-Robeai 85'	Stadium: SC Gmünd Stadium

23 July 2017 Friendly	Al-Ahli (Saudi Arabia)	3–0	(Turkey) Alanyaspor	Bischofshofen, Austria
17:00 WET	Al-Amri; Bassas; Al-Jassim	Report		Stadium: Bischofshofen Stadium

27 July 2017 Friendly	Al-Ahli (Saudi Arabia)	0–2	(United Arab Emirates) Al-Ain	Grabenstätt, Germany
16:00 WET		Report	Berg (pen.); Douglas	Stadium: Sportverein Erlstätt Turnhalle

27 July 2017 Friendly	Konyaspor (Turkey)	4–0	(Saudi Arabia) Al-Ahli	Hallein, Austria
17:00 WET	Milošević 2'; Fındıklı 22'; Bourabia 61'; Fofana 75'	Report		Stadium: Thomas Stangassinger Sportanlage

4 August 2017 Friendly	Al-Ahli (Saudi Arabia)	1–3	(Saudi Arabia) Al-Qadsiah	Jeddah, Saudi Arabia
19:45	Al-Mogahwi 72'	Report	Al-Johani 20', 37'; Bismark 47'	Stadium: Prince Mohammed bin Abdullah Al Faisal Stadium; Referee: Raed Al-Zahrani

5 August 2017 Friendly	Al-Ahli (Saudi Arabia)	7–0	(Saudi Arabia) Al-Entsar	Jeddah, Saudi Arabia
19:45	Assiri 24', 46'; Al-Mogahwi 27'; Al-Moasher 52', 61'; Al-Amri 70'; Seraj 78'	Report		Stadium: Prince Mohammed bin Abdullah Al Faisal Stadium

5 September 2017 Friendly	Al-Ahli (Saudi Arabia)	3–0	(Saudi Arabia) Jeddah	Jeddah, Saudi Arabia
17:50	Bakshween 16'; Al-Asmari 48'; Leonardo 58'			Stadium: Prince Mohammed bin Abdullah Al Faisal Stadium

== Competitions ==
=== Overview ===
Competition	Record								Started round	Final position / round	First match	Last match
Competition	G	W	D	L	GF	GA	GD	Win %	Started round	Final position / round	First match	Last match
Professional League	26	16	7	3	59	26	+33	61.54	—	2nd	11 August 2017	12 April 2018
King Cup	4	2	1	1	10	3	+7	50.00	Round of 32	Semi-finals	6 January 2018	30 March 2018
2017 Champions League	2	0	1	1	3	5	−2	0.00	Quarter-finals	Quarter-finals	22 August 2017	12 September 2017
2018 Champions League	8	4	3	1	12	8	+4	50.00	Group stage	Round of 16	12 February 2018	14 May 2018
Total	40	22	12	6	84	41	+43	55.00				

Updated to match played 14 May 2018
Source: Competitions

=== Pro League ===
==== League table ====
Pos	Team	Pld	W	D	L	GF	GA	GD	Pts	Qualification or relegation
1	Al-Hilal (C)	26	16	8	2	47	23	+24	56	Qualification to AFC Champions League group stage
2	Al-Ahli	26	16	7	3	59	26	+33	55	Qualification to AFC Champions League group stage
3	Al-Nassr	26	12	8	6	47	34	+13	44	Qualification to AFC Champions League play-off round
4	Al-Ettifaq	26	10	6	10	37	46	−9	36 (Note: Al-Ettifaq finished ahead of Al-Fateh on head-to-head points: Al-Ettifaq 2–1 Al-Fateh, Al-Fateh 1–1 Al-Ettifaq)	
5	Al-Fateh	26	9	9	8	34	39	−5	36	

Updated to match(es) played on 12 April 2018. Source: slstat.com
Rules for classification: 1) Points; 2) Head-to-head points; 3) Head-to-head goal difference; 4) Total goal difference; 5) Total goals scored; 6) Play-off (only for deciding champion, relegation and AFC competitions participation).
(C) Champions

==== Results summary ====
Overall								Home						Away					
Pld	W	D	L	GF	GA	GD	Pts	W	D	L	GF	GA	GD	W	D	L	GF	GA	GD
26	16	7	3	59	26	+33	55	10	3	0	37	10	+27	6	4	3	22	16	+6

Last updated: 12 April 2018.
Source: Competitive matches

==== Results by round ====
Round	1	2	3	4	5	6	7	8	9	10	11	12	13	14	15	16	17	18	19	20	21	22	23	24	25	26
Ground	A	H	H	A	H	A	H	A	H	A	H	A	A	H	A	A	H	A	H	A	H	A	H	A	H	H
Result	L	W	D	W	W	W	W	W	D	D	W	L	D	W	W	L	W	W	W	D	W	D	W	W	D	W
Position	8	5	6	3	2	1	1	1	1	1	1	1	2	1	1	2	2	2	2	2	2	2	2	2	2	2

Updated to match(es) played on 12 April 2018. Source: Competitive matches
A = Away; H = Home; W = Win; D = Draw; L = Loss

==== Matches ====
All times are local, AST (UTC+3).

Win Draw Loss Postponed

11 August 2017 1	Al-Ettifaq	2–1	Al-Ahli	Dammam
20:55	Al-Saiari (yellow card) 45+3'; Al-Hazaa 58', 68'; Al-Kassar (yellow card) 90+1'	Report	Al-Somah (yellow card) 11', (goal) 56'; Al-Asmari (yellow card) 34'	Stadium: Prince Mohamed bin Fahd Stadium; Attendance: 3,722; Referee: Khaled Al-Teris

17 August 2017 2	Al-Ahli	4–0	Al-Fateh	Jeddah
20:50	Al-Somah 28'; Al-Dawsari 37' (o.g.); Fetfatzidis 42' (pen.); Majrashi 69'	Report	Al-Ammar (yellow card) 36'; Al-Fuhaid (yellow card) 65'; Al-Dawsari (yellow card) 86'	Stadium: King Abdullah Sports City; Attendance: 11,980; Referee: Abdulrahman Al-Sultan

17 September 2017 3	Al-Ahli	1–1	Al-Nassr	Jeddah
20:25	Fetfatzidis 8'; Al-Somah (yellow card) 35'; Al-Mogahwi (yellow card) 42'; Oboabona (yellow card) 60'	Report	Leonardo (yellow card) 29'; Uvini (yellow card) 65'; Jebor 84'	Stadium: King Abdullah Sports City; Attendance: 10,108; Referee: Milorad Mažić (Serbia)

22 September 2017 4	Al-Batin	1–2	Al-Ahli	Hafar al-Batin
18:35	Alhinho (yellow card) 4'; Pitty 22'; Tarabai (yellow card) 44'; Masrahi (yellow card) 90+2'; Waqes (yellow card) 90+3'	Report	Al-Somah 18'; Oboabona (yellow card) 21'; Bakshween (yellow card) 86'; Hawsawi 90+5'	Stadium: Al-Batin Club Stadium; Attendance: 6,500; Referee: Fahad Al-Mirdasi

30 September 2017 5	Al-Ahli	5–3	Al-Raed	Jeddah
20:15	Leonardo 3'; Al-Somah 46', 63' (pen.); Al-Amri 57'; Al-Mogahwi 90+2'	Report	Eli Sabiá (yellow card) 2'; Otaif 71' (pen.), 78'; Al-Sawadi (yellow card) 75' (yellow-red card) 82'; Shikabala 90+4'	Stadium: King Abdullah Sports City; Attendance: 5,310; Referee: Turki Al-Khudair

14 October 2017 6	Al-Shabab	2–5	Al-Ahli	Riyadh
20:00	Kaabi 8'; Ghazi (yellow card) 42'; Ben Mustapha (yellow card) 82'; Abdul-Amir 86'	Report	Al-Somah 3', 11'; Hawsawi 23', (yellow card) 79'; Bakshween (yellow card) 51'; Al-Mogahwi 61'; Leonardo 84' (pen.)	Stadium: Prince Faisal bin Fahd Stadium; Attendance: 2,633; Referee: Pavel Královec (Czech Republic)

21 October 2017 7	Al-Ahli	3–0	Al-Ittihad	Jeddah
19:55	Al-Somah 50', 90+1', (yellow card) 67'; Leonardo 56'; Al-Mowalad (yellow card) 73'	Report	Qassem (yellow card) 48'; Abdoh (yellow card) 69'	Stadium: King Abdullah Sports City; Attendance: 21,358; Referee: Ivan Bebek (Croatia)

26 October 2017 8	Al-Faisaly	1–2	Al-Ahli	Al-Majma'ah
19:50	Rossi (yellow card) 55'; Abousaban 68'; Hyland (yellow card) 82'; Rogério (yellow card) 85'	Report	Fetfatzidis 59'; Leonardo 84' (pen.)	Stadium: King Salman Sport City Stadium; Attendance: 512; Referee: Turki Al-Khudair

31 October 2017 9	Al-Ahli	1–1	Al-Fayha	Jeddah
19:45	Leonardo 44'; Al-Owais (yellow card) 90+4'	Report	Al-Baqaawi (yellow card) 41'; Gegé (yellow card) 58', (goal) 87'; Kanno (yellow card) 90+4'	Stadium: King Abdullah Sports City; Attendance: 9,774; Referee: Nikolaj Hänni (Switzerland)

19 November 2017 10	Al-Taawoun	1–1	Al-Ahli	Buraidah
19:40	Al-Mousa (yellow card) 55'; Amissi 63'	Report	Al-Somah 3'; Balghaith (yellow card) 39'; Bakshween (yellow card) 45'; Claudemir (yellow card) 57'	Stadium: King Abdullah Sport City Stadium; Attendance: 4,372; Referee: Szymon Marciniak (Poland)

24 November 2017 11	Al-Ahli	3–0	Al-Qadsiah	Jeddah
19:40	Leonardo 34', 90'; Claudemir 86'	Report	Al-Obaid (yellow card) 65'	Stadium: King Abdullah Sports City; Attendance: 7,510; Referee: Tony Chapron (France)

1 December 2017 12	Al-Hilal	2–0	Al-Ahli	Riyadh
20:00	Al-Dawsari 68', 76'	Report	Fetfatzidis (yellow card) 84'	Stadium: Prince Faisal bin Fahd Stadium; Attendance: 14,671; Referee: Milorad Mažić (Serbia)

10 December 2017 13	Ohod	2–2	Al-Ahli	Medina
19:40	Mohsen (yellow card) 8'; Al-Ghamdi 12'; Al-Fatil 77' (o.g.)	Report	Al-Fatil (yellow card) 25'; Balghaith (yellow card) 41'; Al-Mogahwi (yellow card) 48', (goal) 50'; Al-Mowalad (yellow card) 59'; Claudemir 70'; Leonardo (yellow card) 90+9'	Stadium: Prince Mohammed bin Abdul Aziz Stadium; Attendance: 10,225; Referee: Ivan Bebek (Croatia)

15 December 2017 14	Al-Ahli	4–1	Al-Ettifaq	Jeddah
19:40	Al-Jassim 5', (yellow card) 27'; Al-Mowalad (yellow card) 45+5'; Assiri 48', 63', (yellow card) 53'; Al-Harbi 84'	Report	Al-Khalaf (yellow card) 14'; Al-Khairi (yellow card) 22'; Salinas 35'; Al-Khaibari (yellow card) 56'	Stadium: King Abdullah Sports City; Attendance: 4,831; Referee: Szymon Marciniak (Poland)

23 December 2017 15	Al-Fateh	1–3	Al-Ahli	Al-Hasa
19:45	Oueslati 18' (pen.); Al-Fuhaid (yellow card) 56'	Report	Fetfatzidis 9'; Al-Mogahwi (yellow card) 12'; Asiri (yellow card) 21'; Assiri 31', 38'; Oboabona (yellow card) 65'; Kurdi (yellow card) 86'	Stadium: Prince Abdullah bin Jalawi Stadium; Attendance: 2,551; Referee: Shukri Al-Hanfosh

29 December 2017 16	Al-Nassr	3–1	Al-Ahli	Riyadh
19:50	Al-Jebreen 36'; Leonardo 61'; Abdullah (yellow card) 71'; Fouzair 76'	Report	Asiri (yellow card) 56'; Fetfatzidis 59'; Bakshween (yellow card) 84'; Hawsawi (yellow card) 87'	Stadium: King Fahd International Stadium; Attendance: 2,586; Referee: Milorad Mažić (Serbia)

12 January 2018 17	Al-Ahli	5–0	Al-Batin	Jeddah
20:00	Assiri 2', 26' (pen.); Al-Moasher 22', 42'; Fetfatzidis 82'	Report		Stadium: King Abdullah Sports City; Attendance: 23,898; Referee: Mark Clattenburg (England)

30 January 2018 19	Al-Ahli	3–2	Al-Shabab	Jeddah
20:10	Balghaith (yellow card) 31'; Fetfatzidis 40' (pen.); Bakshween (yellow card) 42'; Zakaria 87'; Assiri 90+5', (yellow card) 90+5'; Al Mowalad (yellow card) 90+6'	Report	Benlamri (yellow card) 10'; Benyettou 12', (yellow card) 12'; Bahebri 14'; Abdul-Amir (yellow card) 79'; Muath (yellow card) 90+4'	Stadium: King Abdullah Sports City; Attendance: 32,199; Referee: Fedayi San (Switzerland)

4 February 2018 20	Al-Ittihad	0–0	Al-Ahli	Jeddah
20:20	Abdoh (yellow card) 50'; Villanueva (yellow card) 79'; Akaïchi (yellow card) 84'; Fallatah (yellow card) 85' (yellow-red card) 90+2'; Kahraba (yellow card) 88'	Report	Ben Amor (yellow card) 30'; Al-Harbi (yellow card) 77'; Asiri (yellow card) 81'; Leonardo (yellow card) 81'	Stadium: King Abdullah Sports City; Attendance: 45,913; Referee: Viktor Kassai (Hungary)

8 February 2018 21	Al-Ahli	2–1	Al-Faisaly	Jeddah
20:20	Al-Moasher 4'; Fetfatzidis 9' (pen.); Ben Amor (yellow card) 45+1'; Balghaith (yellow card) 51'; Assiri (yellow card) 78'; Al-Owais (yellow card) 84'; Claudemir (yellow card) 90+5'	Report	Luisinho 36'; Abdulaziz (yellow card) 45'; Al-Deayea (yellow card) 49'; Rossi (yellow card) 90+2'	Stadium: King Abdullah Sports City; Attendance: 9,595; Referee: Jarred Gillett (Australia)

16 February 2018 22	Al-Fayha	1–1	Al-Ahli	Al Majma'ah
18:35	Kanno (yellow card) 74'; Fernández (yellow card) 83'; Asprilla 85', (yellow card) 89'	Report	Milligan (yellow card) 43'; Fetfatzidis 79'; Claudemir (yellow card) 90+4' (yellow-red card) 90+5'	Stadium: King Salman Sport City Stadium; Attendance: 1,590; Referee: Ovidiu Hațegan (Romania)

1 March 2018 23	Al-Ahli	5–1	Al-Taawoun	Jeddah
20:30	Assiri 10'; Leonardo 21'; Asiri 36'; Milligan (yellow card) 38'; Al-Shamrani (yellow card) 45+2'; Al-Mogahwi 58'; Al-Jassim (yellow card) 68'; Al-Moasher 74'	Report	Al-Bishi (yellow card) 64'; Amissi (yellow card) 67'; Al-Bishi 90+3'	Stadium: King Abdullah Sports City; Attendance: 29,321; Referee: Pavel Královec (Czech Republic)

9 March 2018 24	Al-Qadsiah	0–1	Al-Ahli	Khobar
20:30	Belal (yellow card) 62'	Report	Hawsawi 55', (yellow card) 90+2'; Ben Amor (yellow card) 69'	Stadium: Prince Saud bin Jalawi Stadium; Attendance: 4,012; Referee: Sergey Lapochkin (Russia)

16 March 2018 18	Al-Raed	0–3	Al-Ahli	Buraidah
20:30	Al-Mutlaq (yellow card) 15'	Report	Asiri (yellow card) 48'; Leonardo 60'; Al-Somah 65'; Al-Mogahwi 76'	Stadium: King Abdullah Sport City Stadium; Attendance: 5,739; Referee: Paweł Raczkowski (Poland)

7 April 2018 25	Al-Ahli	0–0	Al-Hilal	Jeddah
20:40	Hawsawi (yellow card) 42'	Report		Stadium: King Abdullah Sports City; Attendance: 43,794; Referee: Svein Moen

12 April 2018 26	Al-Ahli	1–0	Ohod	Mecca
20:40	Al-Mogahwi (yellow card) 34'; Leonardo 39'; Milligan (yellow card) 58'	Report	Ahmed (yellow card) 86'	Stadium: King Abdul Aziz; Attendance: 6,778; Referee: Simon Lee Evans (Wales)

=== King Cup ===
Al-Ahli entered the 2018 King Cup in the Round of 32 and were drawn away to Al-Shoulla. In the next round, Al-Ahli faced Al-Orobah at home. They progressed to the Quarter-finals after beating them 6–0. The Quarter-finals saw Al-Ahli defeat Al-Fayha on penalties away from home. In the Semi-finals, Al-Ahli lost to Al-Faisaly in controversial manner.

All times are local, AST (UTC+3).

6 January 2018 Round of 32	Al-Shoulla	0–2	Al-Ahli	Al-Kharj
19:20		Report	Al-Moasher 7'; Fetfatzidis 20'; Asiri (yellow card) 52'; Oboabona (yellow card) 63'	Stadium: Al-Shoulla Club Stadium; Referee: Abdulrahman Al-Sultan

21 January 2018 Round of 16	Al-Ahli	6–0	Al-Orobah	Jeddah
18:45	Al-Moasher 33', 73'; Al-Mogahwi 41'; Fefatzidis 60'; Zakaria 90', 90+2'	Report	Al-Najei (yellow card) 24'	Stadium: King Abdullah Sports City; Attendance: 8,500; Referee: Andrew Dallas (Scotland)

24 February 2018 Quarter-finals	Al-Fayha	2–2 (a.e.t.) (3–4 p)	Al-Ahli	Al-Majma'ah
18:40	Gómez 21'; Izaguirre (yellow card) 50'; Fernández (yellow card) 53'; Jaafari (yellow card) 81'; Asprilla (yellow card) 93', (goal) 100'; Al-Sobhi (yellow card) 120+1'	Report	Balghaith (yellow card) 48' (yellow-red card) 112'; Bakshween (yellow card) 60'; Al-Amri 85'; Asiri 109'	Stadium: King Salman Sport City Stadium; Attendance: 2,278; Referee: Simon Lee Evans (Wales)
	Penalties
	Tziolis (penalty scored); Asprilla (penalty scored); Al-Mutairi (penalty missed); Al-Sobhi (penalty missed); Fernández (penalty scored); Izaguirre (penalty missed)		Fetfatzidis (penalty scored); Milligan (penalty missed); Al-Amri (penalty missed); Leonardo (penalty scored); Awagi (penalty scored); Ben Amor (penalty scored)

30 March 2018 Semi-finals	Al-Faisaly	1–0	Al-Ahli	Al Majma'ah
20:35	Zé Eduardo 77'	Report	Al-Shamrani (red card) 90+6'	Stadium: King Salman Sport City Stadium; Referee: Danny Makkelie (Netherlands)

=== Crown Prince Cup ===
Al-Ahli will enter the Crown Prince Cup in the Round of 16 alongside the other Pro League teams. On 19 September 2017, it was announced that the tournament was cancelled.

30 October 2017 Round of 16	Al-Ettifaq	Cancelled	Al-Ahli	Dammam
19:30				Stadium: Prince Mohammed Bin Fahad Stadium

=== AFC Champions League ===
==== 2017 AFC Champions League ====
===== Quarter-finals =====
22 August 2017 First leg	Persepolis (Iran)	2–2	(Saudi Arabia) Al-Ahli	Muscat, Oman
20:00 UTC+4	Khalilzadeh 72', (yellow card) 86'; Mensha 84'	Report	Al-Somah 2'; Al-Amri (yellow card) 41'; Leonardo 58'	Stadium: Sultan Qaboos; Attendance: 6,500; Referee: Adham Makhadmeh (Jordan)

12 September 2017 Second leg	Al-Ahli (Saudi Arabia)	1–3 (3–5 agg.)	(Iran) Persepolis	Abu Dhabi, United Arab Emirates
19:15 UTC+4	Bakshween (yellow card) 36'; Al-Amri 52'; Hawsawi (red card) 81'	Report	Alipour 5'; Kamyabinia (red card) 12'; Mosalman (yellow card) 37'; Taremi (yellow card) 56', (goal) 90+4' (pen.); Ansari (yellow card) 73'; Mensha 82' (pen.); H. Mahini (yellow card) 87'	Stadium: Mohammed Bin Zayed Stadium; Attendance: 5.820; Referee: Ma Ning (China)

==== 2018 AFC Champions League ====
===== Group stage =====
Pos	Team	Pld	W	D	L	GF	GA	GD	Pts	Qualification	AHL	JAZ	GHA	TRA
1	(Saudi Arabia) Al-Ahli	6	4	2	0	9	4	+5	14	Advance to knockout stage	—	2–1	1–1	2–0
2	(United Arab Emirates) Al-Jazira	6	2	2	2	9	9	0	8 (Note: Head-to-head results: Al-Jazira 3–2 Al-Gharafa, Al-Gharafa 2–3 Al-Jazira.)	Advance to knockout stage	1–2	—	3–2	0–0
3	(Qatar) Al-Gharafa	6	2	2	2	12	9	+3	8		1–1	2–3	—	3–0
4	(Iran) Tractor Sazi	6	0	2	4	2	10	−8	2		0–1	1–1	1–3	—

Source: AFC
Rules for classification: Group stage tiebreakers
Notes:

12 February 2018 1	Tractor Sazi (Iran)	0–1	(Saudi Arabia) Al-Ahli	Seeb, Oman
19:30 UTC+4	Iranpourian (yellow card) 49'; Sharbati (yellow card) 60'	Report	Al-Amri (yellow card) 45'; Assiri 67'	Stadium: Al-Seeb Stadium; Attendance: 1,253; Referee: Jumpei Iida (Japan)

19 February 2018 2	Al-Ahli (Saudi Arabia)	2–1	(United Arab Emirates) Al-Jazira	Jeddah, Saudi Arabia
20:10 UTC+3	Al-Jassim 10'; Assiri 70' (pen.)	Report	Khasif (yellow card) 45+3'; Boussoufa (yellow card) 66'; Jamal (yellow card) 74'; Mabkhout (yellow card) 87'; Al Mosailem 89' (o.g.)	Stadium: King Abdullah Sports City; Attendance: 14,477; Referee: Hettikamkanamge Perera (Sri Lanka)

5 March 2018 3	Al-Gharafa (Qatar)	1–1	(Saudi Arabia) Al-Ahli	Al Rayyan, Qatar
18:10 UTC+3	Quijada 90+1'	Report	Balghaith 62'	Stadium: Thani bin Jassim Stadium; Referee: Valentin Kovalenko (Uzbekistan)

13 March 2018 4	Al-Ahli (Saudi Arabia)	1–1	(Qatar) Al-Gharafa	Jeddah, Saudi Arabia
20:15 UTC+3	Al-Mowalad (yellow card) 32'; Al-Moasher (yellow card) 45+3'; Zakaria 58'	Report	Taremi 56'; Sneijder (yellow card) 90'	Stadium: King Abdullah Sports City; Attendance: 19,020; Referee: Ko Hyung-jin (South Korea)

3 April 2018 5	Al-Ahli (Saudi Arabia)	2–0	(Iran) Tractor Sazi	Al Ain, United Arab Emirates
20:20 UTC+4	Assiri 49'; Balghaith (yellow card) 70'; Zakaria 90+2'	Report	Azadi (yellow card) 81'	Stadium: Tahnoun bin Mohammed Stadium; Attendance: 100; Referee: Peter Green (Australia)

17 April 2018 6	Al-Jazira (United Arab Emirates)	1–2	(Saudi Arabia) Al-Ahli	Abu Dhabi, United Arab Emirates
18:30 UTC+4	Romarinho 68'	Report	Al-Amri 6'; Zakaria 30'; Al-Moasher (yellow card) 43'	Stadium: Mohammed bin Zayed Stadium; Attendance: 621; Referee: Minoru Tōjō (Japan)

==== Knockout phase ====
===== Round of 16 =====
7 May 2018 First leg	Al-Sadd (Qatar)	2–1	(Saudi Arabia) Al-Ahli	Doha, Qatar
19:15 UTC+3	Khoukhi 3', 28'	Report	Assiri 47'; Bakshween (yellow card) 62'	Stadium: Jassim bin Hamad Stadium; Attendance: 3,613; Referee: Chris Beath (Australia)

14 May 2018 First leg	Al-Ahli (Saudi Arabia)	2–2	(Qatar) Al-Sadd	Jeddah, Saudi Arabia
20:40 UTC+3	Claudemir 9', (yellow card) 90'; Hawsawi (yellow card) 33'; Assiri 39', (yellow card) 87'	Report	Bounedjah 2', 70'; Abubakar (yellow card) 42'; Al-Sheeb (yellow card) 87'	Stadium: King Abdullah Sports City; Attendance: 24,150; Referee: Fu Ming (China)

== Statistics ==
=== Appearances ===
Last updated on 14 May 2018.

No.	Pos	Nat	Player	Total		Pro League		King Cup		2017 Champions League		2018 Champions League	
No.	Pos	Nat	Player	Apps	Goals	Apps	Goals	Apps	Goals	Apps	Goals	Apps	Goals
Goalkeepers
1	GK	(Saudi Arabia) KSA	Yasser Al Mosailem	10	0	2	0	2	0	0	0	6	0
33	GK	(Saudi Arabia) KSA	Mohammed Al-Owais	29	0	24	0	1	0	2	0	2	0
36	GK	(Saudi Arabia) KSA	Raghid Al-Najjar	0	0	0	0	0	0	0	0	0	0
66	GK	(Saudi Arabia) KSA	Basem Atallah	1	0	0	0	1	0	0	0	0	0
Defenders
2	DF	(Saudi Arabia) KSA	Ali Al-Zubaidi	1	0	0+1	0	0	0	0	0	0	0
5	DF	(Australia) AUS	Mark Milligan	17	0	8	0	2	0	0	0	6+1	0
6	DF	(Saudi Arabia) KSA	Mohammed Al-Fatil	11	0	4+1	0	1+1	0	2	0	2	0
21	DF	(Saudi Arabia) KSA	Ageel Balghaith	25	1	13+3	0	3	0	0	0	6	1
23	DF	(Saudi Arabia) KSA	Saeed Al-Mowalad	33	0	22	0	3	0	2	0	6	0
25	DF	(Saudi Arabia) KSA	Motaz Hawsawi	33	4	22+1	4	1	0	2	0	5+2	0
27	DF	(Saudi Arabia) KSA	Hamdan Al-Shamrani	10	0	3+1	0	2	0	0+1	0	1+2	0
31	DF	(Saudi Arabia) KSA	Mansoor Al-Harbi	30	1	21+1	1	1	0	0	0	7	0
32	DF	(Saudi Arabia) KSA	Faisal Darisi	2	0	0	0	0+1	0	0	0	1	0
37	DF	(Saudi Arabia) KSA	Abdullah Hassoun	1	0	0	0	0	0	0	0	0+1	0
77	DF	(Saudi Arabia) KSA	Amiri Kurdi	12	0	5+4	0	1	0	0	0	1+1	0
Midfielders
4	MF	(Saudi Arabia) KSA	Waleed Bakshween	27	0	13+3	0	3	0	2	0	5+1	0
7	MF	(Saudi Arabia) KSA	Salman Al-Moasher	22	7	6+7	4	2	3	0+1	0	5+1	0
8	MF	(Saudi Arabia) KSA	Taisir Al-Jassim	18	2	8+3	1	1	0	1	0	5	1
10	MF	(Greece) GRE	Giannis Fetfatzidis	32	11	25+1	9	4	2	0	0	1+1	0
11	MF	(Saudi Arabia) KSA	Housain Al-Mogahwi	35	6	21+3	5	3	1	1+1	0	3+3	0
15	MF	(Saudi Arabia) KSA	Saleh Al-Amri	19	4	3+5	1	2+1	1	2	1	4+2	1
17	MF	(Saudi Arabia) KSA	Ayman Al-Khulaif	1	0	0+1	0	0	0	0	0	0	0
18	MF	(Saudi Arabia) KSA	Ali Al-Asmari	6	0	1+3	0	0	0	0+1	0	0+1	0
19	MF	(Brazil) BRA	Claudemir	30	3	20	2	0+1	0	2	0	5+2	1
20	MF	(Tunisia) TUN	Mohamed Ben Amor	6	0	5	0	1	0	0	0	0	0
24	MF	(Saudi Arabia) KSA	Ali Awagi	3	0	0+1	0	0+1	0	0	0	1	0
26	MF	(Saudi Arabia) KSA	Abdulmohsen Al-Subhi	0	0	0	0	0	0	0	0	0	0
35	MF	(Saudi Arabia) KSA	Yousef Al-Harbi	0	0	0	0	0	0	0	0	0	0
42	MF	(Brazil) BRA	Leonardo	23	11	16+3	10	2	0	2	1	0	0
45	MF	(Saudi Arabia) KSA	Abdulfattah Asiri	25	2	8+10	1	3	1	0	0	4	0
50	MF	(Saudi Arabia) KSA	Abdullah Majrashi	14	1	1+7	1	1+2	0	0+1	0	2	0
88	MF	(Egypt) EGY	Moamen Zakaria	17	6	2+4	1	2+1	2	0	0	4+4	3
Forwards
9	ST	(Syria) SYR	Omar Al Soma	17	12	13+1	11	1	0	2	1	0	0
14	ST	(Saudi Arabia) KSA	Muhannad Assiri	25	13	9+6	8	1+1	0	0+1	0	6+1	5
29	ST	(Saudi Arabia) KSA	Abdulrahman Ghareeb	2	0	0+1	0	0	0	0	0	0+1	0
41	ST	(Saudi Arabia) KSA	Mansour Al-Muwallad	0	0	0	0	0	0	0	0	0	0
Players sent out on loan this season
13	DF	(Egypt) EGY	Mohamed Abdel-Shafy	5	0	2	0	1	0	2	0	0	0
49	MF	(Saudi Arabia) KSA	Ahmed Al-Zain	3	0	0+2	0	0+1	0	0	0	0	0
Player who made an appearance this season but have left the club
28	DF	(Nigeria) NGA	Godfrey Oboabona	10	0	9	0	1	0	0	0	0	0

=== Goalscorers ===
Rank	No.	Pos	Nat	Name	Pro League	King Cup	2017 Champions League	2018 Champions League	Total
1	14	FW	(Saudi Arabia)	Muhannad Assiri	8	0	0	5	13
2	9	FW	(Syria)	Omar Al Somah	11	0	1	0	12
3	10	MF	(Greece)	Giannis Fetfatzidis	9	2	0	0	11
3	42	MF	(Brazil)	Leonardo	10	0	1	0	11
5	7	MF	(Saudi Arabia)	Salman Al-Moasher	4	3	0	0	7
6	11	MF	(Saudi Arabia)	Housain Al-Mogahwi	5	1	0	0	6
6	88	MF	(Egypt)	Moamen Zakaria	1	2	0	3	6
8	15	MF	(Saudi Arabia)	Saleh Al-Amri	1	1	1	1	4
9	19	MF	(Brazil)	Claudemir	2	0	0	1	3
9	25	DF	(Saudi Arabia)	Motaz Hawsawi	3	0	0	0	3
11	8	MF	(Saudi Arabia)	Taisir Al-Jassim	1	0	0	1	2
11	45	MF	(Saudi Arabia)	Abdulfattah Asiri	1	1	0	0	2
13	21	DF	(Saudi Arabia)	Ageel Balghaith	0	0	0	1	1
13	31	DF	(Saudi Arabia)	Mansoor Al-Harbi	1	0	0	0	1
13	50	MF	(Saudi Arabia)	Abdullah Majrashi	1	0	0	0	1
Own goal					1	0	0	0	1
Total					59	10	3	12	84

Last Updated: 14 May 2018

=== Clean sheets ===
Rank	No.	Pos	Nat	Name	Pro League	King Cup	2017 Champions League	2018 Champions League	Total
1	33	GK	(Saudi Arabia)	Mohammed Al-Owais	7	0	0	0	7
2	1	GK	(Saudi Arabia)	Yasser Al Mosailem	2	2	0	2	6
Total					9	2	0	2	13

Last Updated: 17 April 2018
