= 2022–23 Al-Ahli Saudi FC season =

Al-Ahli
2022–23 season
- President: Majed Al-Nefaie (until 1 September); Waleed Muath (from 1 September)
- Manager: Robert Siboldi (until 3 September); Pitso Mosimane (from 25 September)
- Stadium: King Abdullah Sports City
- FDL: 1st (promoted)
- Top goalscorer: League: Haitham Asiri (10 goals); All: Haitham Asiri (10 goals)
- Highest home attendance: 31,966 (vs. Al-Kholood, 5 September 2022)
- Lowest home attendance: 4,119 (vs. Hajer, 21 December 2022)
- Average home league attendance: 14,309
Home colours	Away colours	Third colours
- All statistics correct as of 29 May 2023.

The 2022–23 season was Al-Ahli's first season in the Saudi First Division League following their relegation from the Pro League last season in their 86th year in existence. It was also their first season in the second tier of Saudi football since the formation of the club.

The season covered the period from 1 July 2022 to 30 June 2023.

== Players ==
=== Squad information ===
As of 1 February 2023

Note: Flags indicate national team as defined under FIFA eligibility rules; some limited exceptions apply. Players may hold more than one non-FIFA nationality.

No.	Pos.	Nation	Player
1	GK	KSA	Yasser Al-Mosailem (captain)
2	DF	KSA	Fahad Al-Hamad
4	DF	KSA	Talal Al-Absi
7	MF	NED	Hicham Faik
9	MF	ALG	Ryad Boudebouz
10	MF	KSA	Salman Al-Moasher
14	MF	KSA	Firas Al-Ghamdi
15	DF	KSA	Ibrahim Al-Zubaidi
16	MF	URU	Nicolás Milesi
17	FW	KSA	Haitham Asiri
18	FW	KSA	Thamer Al-Ali (on loan from Al-Wehda)
19	FW	KSA	Sultan Al-Suraihi
21	GK	KSA	Emad Fida
22	GK	KSA	Abdulrahman Al-Sanbi
23	DF	ANG	Bastos
24	FW	KSA	Morad Khodari
27	DF	KSA	Ali Majrashi
28	DF	KSA	Ahmed Al-Nakhli

No.	Pos.	Nation	Player
29	MF	KSA	Mohammed Al-Majhad
30	MF	KSA	Ziyad Al-Johani
31	GK	KSA	Nawaf Shae'an
32	MF	KSA	Eyad Madani
37	DF	KSA	Abdulbasit Hindi
38	DF	KSA	Naif Kariri (on loan from Al-Wehda)
40	MF	KSA	Ali Al-Asmari
41	DF	KSA	Manaf Abo Yabes
46	DF	KSA	Rayane Hamidou
62	GK	KSA	Abdullah Abdoh
66	DF	KSA	Abdulrahman Al-Zahrani
70	FW	KSA	Abdullah Al-Mogren
71	GK	KSA	Mohammed Al-Rubaie
77	FW	KSA	Hassan Al-Ali
92	MF	GAM	Modou Barrow
94	FW	BRA	Marcão
97	DF	KSA	Adel Khodari
99	DF	KSA	Mansour Al-Shammari (on loan from Al-Nassr)

=== Out on loan ===
Note: Flags indicate national team as defined under FIFA eligibility rules; some limited exceptions apply. Players may hold more than one non-FIFA nationality.

No.	Pos.	Nation	Player
13	DF	KSA	Hani Al-Sebyani (at Al-Khaleej until 30 June 2023)
20	MF	SEN	Alassane Ndao (at Antalyaspor until 30 June 2023)

No.	Pos.	Nation	Player
—	DF	MKD	Ezgjan Alioski (at Fenerbahçe until 30 June 2023)
—	FW	SYR	Omar Al Somah (at Al-Arabi until 30 June 2023)

== Transfers and loans ==
=== Transfers in ===
Entry date	Position	No.	Player	From club	Fee	Ref.
30 June 2022	DF	23	(Saudi Arabia) Abdullah Hassoun	(Saudi Arabia) Al-Tai	End of loan	
30 June 2022	DF	41	(Saudi Arabia) Manaf Abo Yabes	(Saudi Arabia) Al-Jabalain	End of loan	
30 June 2022	DF	46	(Saudi Arabia) Rayane Hamidou	(Saudi Arabia) Al-Tai	End of loan	
30 June 2022	DF	70	(Saudi Arabia) Mohammed Bassas	(Saudi Arabia) Ohod	End of loan	
30 June 2022	MF	32	(Saudi Arabia) Eyad Madani	(Saudi Arabia) Jeddah	End of loan	
30 June 2022	FW	18	(Chad) Othman Alhaj	(Saudi Arabia) Al-Ain	End of loan	
30 June 2022	FW	99	(Saudi Arabia) Safi Al-Zaqrati	(Saudi Arabia) Al-Nahda	End of loan	
18 July 2022	DF	15	(Saudi Arabia) Ibrahim Al-Zubaidi	(Saudi Arabia) Al-Tai	Free	
26 July 2022	GK	23	(Brazil) Renan Ribeiro	(Portugal) Sporting CP	Free	
26 July 2022	FW	11	(Tunisia) Youssef Abdelli	(Tunisia) Monastir	$590,000	
1 August 2022	MF	20	(Argentina) Lisandro Alzugaray	(Ecuador) Universidad Católica	Free	
21 August 2022	MF	–	(Saudi Arabia) Zaid Al-Enezi	(Saudi Arabia) Al-Batin	Free	
24 August 2022	FW	8	(England) Lewis Grabban	(England) Nottingham Forest	Free	
6 September 2022	MF	7	(Netherlands) Hicham Faik	(Saudi Arabia) Al-Faisaly	Free	
8 September 2022	DF	23	(Angola) Bastos	(Saudi Arabia) Al-Ain	Free	
8 September 2022	MF	9	(Algeria) Ryad Boudebouz	(France) Saint-Étienne	Free	
1 January 2023	GK	21	(Saudi Arabia) Emad Fida	(Saudi Arabia) Al-Qadsiah	Free	
16 January 2023	FW	92	(The Gambia) Modou Barrow	(South Korea) Jeonbuk Hyundai Motors	Undisclosed	
21 January 2023	FW	94	(Brazil) Marcão	(China) Wuhan Three Towns	Free	
28 January 2023	MF	16	(Uruguay) Nicolás Milesi	(Uruguay) Peñarol	Free	

=== Loans in ===
Start date	End date	Position	No.	Player	From club	Fee	Ref.
4 September 2022	End of season	DF	38	(Saudi Arabia) Naif Kariri	(Saudi Arabia) Al-Wehda	None	
6 September 2022	End of season	FW	11	(Saudi Arabia) Thamer Al-Ali	(Saudi Arabia) Al-Wehda	None	
2 January 2023	End of season	DF	99	(Saudi Arabia) Mansour Al-Shammari	(Saudi Arabia) Al-Nassr	None	

=== Transfers out ===
Exit date	Position	No.	Player	To club	Fee	Ref.
30 June 2022	MF	24	(Saudi Arabia) Ayman Yahya	(Saudi Arabia) Al-Nassr	End of loan	
1 July 2022	MF	16	(Saudi Arabia) Nooh Al-Mousa	(Saudi Arabia) Al-Fateh	Free	
6 July 2022	DF	3	(Brazil) Dankler		Released	
6 July 2022	MF	8	(Croatia) Filip Bradarić		Released	
7 July 2022	MF	11	(Saudi Arabia) Housain Al-Mogahwi	(Saudi Arabia) Al-Fateh	Free	
12 July 2022	MF	18	(Brazil) Carlos Eduardo	(Brazil) Botafogo	Free	
13 July 2022	FW	19	(Saudi Arabia) Mohammed Majrashi	(Saudi Arabia) Al-Fayha	Free	
16 July 2022	DF	23	(Saudi Arabia) Abdullah Hassoun	(Saudi Arabia) Damac	Undisclosed	
25 July 2022	DF	70	(Saudi Arabia) Mohammed Bassas	(Saudi Arabia) Ohod	Free	
10 August 2022	DF	–	(Saudi Arabia) Mohammed Al-Zubaidi	(Saudi Arabia) Al-Orobah	Free	
20 August 2022	MF	29	(Saudi Arabia) Abdulrahman Ghareeb	(Saudi Arabia) Al-Nassr	$6,650,000	
22 August 2022	DF	5	(Saudi Arabia) Mohammed Al-Khabrani	(Saudi Arabia) Al-Khaleej	Undisclosed	
29 August 2022	DF	–	(Saudi Arabia) Emad Al-Sibyani	(Saudi Arabia) Al-Bukiryah	Free	
29 August 2022	MF	–	(Saudi Arabia) Abdulaziz Gharawi	(Saudi Arabia) Al-Bukiryah	Free	
7 September 2022	FW	18	(Chad) Othman Alhaj	(Bahrain) Sitra	Free	
9 September 2022	GK	23	(Brazil) Renan Ribeiro		Released	
16 September 2022	FW	–	(Saudi Arabia) Abdullah Mahbub	(Saudi Arabia) Al-Washm	Free	
25 December 2022	MF	20	(Argentina) Lisandro Alzugaray	(Ecuador) LDU Quito	Free	
17 January 2023	FW	99	(Saudi Arabia) Safi Al-Zaqrati	(Saudi Arabia) Jeddah	Free	
23 January 2023	FW	11	(Tunisia) Youssef Abdelli	(Tunisia) ES Sahel	Free	

=== Loans out ===
Start date	End date	Position	No.	Player	To club	Fee	Ref.
2 August 2022	End of season	DF	7	(North Macedonia) Ezgjan Alioski	(Turkey) Fenerbahçe	None	
9 August 2022	End of season	FW	9	(Syria) Omar Al Somah	(Qatar) Al-Arabi	None	
31 August 2022	End of season	DF	13	(Saudi Arabia) Hani Al-Sebyani	(Saudi Arabia) Al-Khaleej	None	

== Pre-season ==
28 July 2022 Friendly	Al-Ahli (Saudi Arabia)	2–1	(Qatar) Al-Shahaniya	Sapanca, Turkey
18:00 TRT	Al-Ghamdi; Al-Mogren	Report		Stadium: Sapanca Atatürk Stadyumu

2 August 2022 Friendly	Al-Ahli (Saudi Arabia)	1–1	(Kuwait) Al-Salmiya	Sapanca, Turkey
18:00 TRT	Al-Moasher	Report	Rostam	Stadium: Sapanca Atatürk Stadyumu

6 August 2022 Friendly	Al-Ahli (Saudi Arabia)	0–0	(Saudi Arabia) Al-Khaleej	Turkey
17:00 TRT		Report

9 August 2022 Friendly	Al-Ahli (Saudi Arabia)	0–2	(Saudi Arabia) Al-Raed	Kartepe, Turkey
18:00 TRT		Report	Tavares 63'; Fouzair 89'

16 August 2022 Friendly	Al-Ahli (Saudi Arabia)	2–0	(Saudi Arabia) Jeddah	Jeddah, Saudi Arabia
19:30 AST	Al-Hamad 25'; Al-Majhad 57'	Report		Stadium: Prince Mohammed bin Abdullah Al Faisal Stadium

== Competitions ==
=== First Division League ===
==== League table ====
Pos	Team	Pld	W	D	L	GF	GA	GD	Pts	Promotion, qualification or relegation
1	Al-Ahli (C, P)	34	21	9	4	48	24	+24	72	Promotion to the Pro League
2	Al-Hazem (P)	34	20	8	6	55	29	+26	68 (Note: Al-Hazem finished ahead of Al-Okhdood on head-to-head points: Al-Hazem: 6 pts, Al-Okhdood: 0 pts (Al-Hazem 1–0 Al-Okhdood, Al-Okhdood 0–1 Al-Hazem).)	Promotion to the Pro League
3	Al-Okhdood (P)	34	21	5	8	64	35	+29	68	Promotion to the Pro League
4	Al-Riyadh (P)	34	19	6	9	52	37	+15	63	Promotion to the Pro League
5	Al-Faisaly	34	16	10	8	45	32	+13	58	
6	Al-Arabi	34	13	10	11	43	43	0	49	
7	Al-Kholood	34	12	7	15	33	31	+2	43 (Note: Al-Kholood finished ahead of Hajer on overall goal difference: Al-Kholood +2, Hajer −5 (Hajer 1–0 Al-Kholood, Al-Kholood 1–0 Hajer).)	
8	Hajer	34	11	10	13	36	41	−5	43	
9	Ohod	34	10	12	12	29	38	−9	42	
10	Al-Jabalain	34	9	14	11	42	43	−1	41	
11	Al-Qadsiah	34	10	10	14	29	34	−5	40 (Note: Positions determined by head-to-head points: Al-Qadsiah: 9 pts; Al-Orobah: 7 pts; Al-Qaisumah: 1 pts.)	
12	Al-Orobah	34	11	7	16	35	41	−6	40 (Note: Al-Shoulla were awarded a 3–0 win over Al-Orobah due to Al-Orobah's inability to hold the fixture.)	
13	Al-Qaisumah	34	8	16	10	35	44	−9	40	
14	Al-Ain	34	11	6	17	34	46	−12	39	
15	Jeddah	34	10	8	16	34	40	−6	38	
16	Najran (R)	34	9	9	16	36	54	−18	36	Relegation to the Second Division
17	Al-Sahel (R)	34	7	11	16	36	51	−15	32	Relegation to the Second Division
18	Al-Shoulla (R)	34	5	8	21	23	46	−23	23	Relegation to the Second Division

Updated to match(es) played on 29 May 2023. Source: goalzz.com
Rules for classification: 1) Points; 2) Head-to-head points; 3) Head-to-head goal difference; 4) Total goal difference; 5) Total goals scored; 6) Fair-play points (Note: Head-to-head record is used only after all the matches between the teams in question have been played).
(C) Champions; (P) Promoted; (R) Relegated

==== Results summary ====
Overall								Home						Away					
Pld	W	D	L	GF	GA	GD	Pts	W	D	L	GF	GA	GD	W	D	L	GF	GA	GD
34	21	9	4	48	24	+24	72	11	3	3	26	15	+11	10	6	1	22	9	+13

Last updated: 29 May 2023.
Source: kooora.com

==== Results by round ====
Round	1	2	3	4	5	6	7	8	9	10	11	12	13	14	15	16	17	18	19	20	21	22	23	24	25	26	27	28	29	30	31	32	33	34
Ground	H	A	H	A	H	A	H	A	A	H	A	H	H	A	H	A	H	A	H	A	H	A	H	A	H	H	A	H	A	A	H	A	H	A
Result	D	L	W	D	W	D	W	W	W	W	D	D	W	D	W	D	W	W	L	W	W	W	W	W	L	D	W	W	W	W	L	W	W	D
Position	8	15	11	12	7	7	4	3	5	5	7	9	5	6	6	3	1	1	3	2	2	2	2	1	2	2	1	1	1	1	1	1	1	1

Updated to match(es) played on 29 May 2023. Source:
A = Away; H = Home; W = Win; D = Draw; L = Loss

==== Matches ====
All times are local, AST (UTC+3).

Win Draw Loss Postponed

24 August 2022 1	Al-Ahli	1–1	Al-Qaisumah	Jeddah
20:50	Al-Mogren 26'	Report	Djaouchi 90+1'	Stadium: King Abdullah Sports City; Attendance: 17,874; Referee: Mohammed Al-Daqqash

30 August 2022 2	Al-Okhdood	2–0	Al-Ahli	Najran
20:40	Al-Shaikh 38'; Barry 54'	Report		Stadium: Prince Hathloul bin Abdul Aziz Sport City Stadium; Referee: Abdullah Al-Harbi

5 September 2022 3	Al-Ahli	1–0	Al-Kholood	Jeddah
20:35	Grabban 51' (pen.)	Report		Stadium: King Abdullah Sports City; Attendance: 31,966; Referee: Abdulrahman Al-Sultan

11 September 2022 4	Al-Orobah	0–0	Al-Ahli	Sakakah
19:05		Report		Stadium: Al-Orobah Club Stadium; Referee: Khaled Al-Ahmari

16 September 2022 5	Al-Ahli	3–0	Ohod	Jeddah
20:30	Al-Mogren 29'; Al-Asmari 44' (pen.); Al-Johani 76'	Report		Stadium: King Abdullah Sports City; Attendance: 15,272; Referee: Mohammed Al-Amri

5 October 2022 6	Jeddah	1–1	Al-Ahli	Jeddah
20:15	Baadheem 58'	Report	Asiri 26'	Stadium: King Abdullah Sports City; Referee: Abdulsamad Bakri

11 October 2022 7	Al-Ahli	2–1	Najran	Jeddah
20:00	Al-Mogren 54' (pen.), 90' (pen.)	Report	Coutinho 45'	Stadium: King Abdullah Sports City; Attendance: 7,023; Referee: Abdullah Zarban

16 October 2022 8	Al-Riyadh	0–2	Al-Ahli	Riyadh
20:30		Report	Asiri 86'; Faik 90+7' (pen.)	Stadium: Prince Faisal bin Fahd Stadium; Referee: Ahmed Al-Rumaikhani

15 December 2022 11	Al-Ain	0–0	Al-Ahli	Al Bahah
15:40		Report		Stadium: King Saud Sport City Stadium; Referee: Abdulrahman Al-Sultan

21 December 2022 13	Al-Ahli	3–1	Hajer	Jeddah
18:25	Boudebouz 11'; Al-Johani 32'; H. Al-Ali 68'	Report	Maïga 90+10'	Stadium: Prince Abdullah Al Faisal Stadium; Attendance: 4,119; Referee: Fraih Al-Jaloud

27 December 2022 14	Al-Arabi	0–0	Al-Ahli	Unaizah
15:20		Report		Stadium: Department of Education Stadium; Referee: Abdullah Zarban

31 December 2022 12	Al-Ahli	2–2	Al-Sahel	Jeddah
19:35	H. Al-Ali 68'; Asiri 82'	Report	Al-Maqadi 61'; Al-Radhi 90+3'	Stadium: Prince Abdullah Al Faisal Stadium; Attendance: 7,186; Referee: Bandar Al-Qahtani

4 January 2023 15	Al-Ahli	2–0	Al-Shoulla	Jeddah
18:30	Asiri 18'; M. Khodari 72'	Report		Stadium: Prince Abdullah Al Faisal Stadium; Attendance: 6,031; Referee: Faisal Al-Blwi

10 January 2023 16	Al-Qadsiah	1–1	Al-Ahli	Khobar
17:40	Msuva 2'	Report	H. Al-Ali 54'	Stadium: Prince Saud bin Jalawi Stadium; Referee: Fraih Al-Jaloud

14 January 2023 9	Al-Faisaly	1–2	Al-Ahli	Al Majma'ah
15:30	Cassiano 45+3'	Report	Asiri 27', 45+7'	Stadium: Al Majma'ah Sports City; Referee: Turki Hashlan

18 January 2023 17	Al-Ahli	1–0	Al-Hazem	Jeddah
18:40	Al-Mogren 74'	Report		Stadium: Prince Abdullah Al Faisal Stadium; Attendance: 21,470; Referee: Mohammed Al-Daqqash

24 January 2023 10	Al-Ahli	3–0	Al-Jabalain	Jeddah
19:45	Asiri 40', 55'; Al-Moasher 86'	Report		Stadium: Prince Abdullah Al Faisal Stadium; Attendance: 20,652; Referee: Meshal Al-Shehri

28 January 2023 18	Al-Qaisumah	0–2	Al-Ahli	Hafar al Batin
15:45		Report	Boudebouz 17'; Faik 60'	Stadium: Al-Batin Club Stadium; Referee: Mohammed Abo Shaqqara

2 February 2023 19	Al-Ahli	1–4	Al-Okhdood	Jeddah
19:00	Bastos 34'	Report	Barry 45+1' (pen.), 88'; Al-Mosaabi 55'; Mendes 61'	Stadium: Prince Abdullah Al Faisal Stadium; Attendance: 21,196; Referee: Mohammed Al-Beredi

7 February 2023 20	Al-Kholood	1–2	Al-Ahli	Ar Ras
18:30	Bastos 47' (o.g.)	Report	H. Al-Ali 40'; Barrow 73'	Stadium: Al Hazm Club Stadium; Referee: Ahmed Al-Barakati

13 February 2022 21	Al-Ahli	1–0	Al-Orobah	Jeddah
20:10	Bastos 53'	Report		Stadium: Prince Abdullah Al Faisal Stadium; Attendance: 13,078; Referee: Fraih Al-Jaloud

20 February 2023 22	Ohod	0–2	Al-Ahli	Medina
16:20		Report	Asiri 10'; Bastos 65'	Stadium: Ohod Club Stadium; Referee: Turki Hashlan

1 March 2022 23	Al-Ahli	1–0	Jeddah	Jeddah
20:15	Barrow 51'	Report		Stadium: Prince Abdullah Al Faisal Stadium; Attendance: 14,023; Referee: Mohammed Abo Shaqqara

7 March 2023 24	Najran	0–2	Al-Ahli	Najran
18:45		Report	Al-Mogren 71'; M. Khodari 90+3'	Stadium: Prince Hathloul bin Abdul Aziz Sport City Stadium; Referee: Mamdouh Al Shahdan

12 March 2022 25	Al-Ahli	0–2	Al-Riyadh	Jeddah
20:25		Report	Muralha 6'; Al-Habashi 87'	Stadium: Prince Abdullah Al Faisal Stadium; Attendance: 14,362; Referee: Abdulsamad Bakri

4 April 2023 27	Al-Jabalain	1–2	Al-Ahli	Ha'il
22:00	Plata 78'	Report	H. Al-Ali 8'; Boudebouz 90+7' (pen.)	Stadium: Prince Abdul Aziz bin Musa'ed Stadium; Referee: Faisal Al-Blwi

10 April 2023 28	Al-Ahli	1–0	Al-Ain	Jeddah
22:00	Marcão 90'	Report		Stadium: Prince Abdullah Al Faisal Stadium; Attendance: 9,489; Referee: Mohammed Al-Daqqash

15 April 2023 26	Al-Ahli	2–2	Al-Faisaly	Jeddah
22:00	Boudebouz 44' (pen.), 82' (pen.)	Report	Juma 84'; Omar 88'	Stadium: Prince Abdullah Al Faisal Stadium; Attendance: 12,131; Referee: Meshal Al-Shehri

24 April 2023 29	Al-Sahel	1–3	Al-Ahli	Khobar
20:40	Al Dubais 60'	Report	Asiri 43'; Boudebouz 70' (pen.); Faik 78'	Stadium: Prince Saud bin Jalawi Stadium; Referee: Turki Hashlan

3 May 2023 30	Hajer	1–2	Al-Ahli	Al-Hasa
20:15	Mundele 56'	Report	H. Al-Ali 45+5'; Boudebouz 90+7' (pen.)	Stadium: Hajer Club Stadium; Referee: Ahmed Al-Rumaikhani

9 May 2023 31	Al-Ahli	1–2	Al-Arabi	Jeddah
20:45	Barrow 21'	Report	Mbengue 42' (pen.); Wahib 75'	Stadium: Prince Abdullah Al Faisal Stadium; Attendance: 21,264; Referee: Mohammed Abo Shaqqara

17 May 2023 32	Al-Shoulla	0–1	Al-Ahli	Al-Kharj
20:20		Report	Boudebouz 60' (pen.)	Stadium: Al-Shoulla Club Stadium; Referee: Musaad Al-Meshari

23 May 2023 33	Al-Ahli	1–0	Al-Qadsiah	Jeddah
21:00	Boudebouz 54' (pen.)	Report		Stadium: Prince Abdullah Al Faisal Stadium; Attendance: 6,109; Referee: Fraih Al-Jaloud

29 May 2023 34	Al-Hazem	0–0	Al-Ahli	Ar Rass
21:00		Report		Stadium: Al-Hazem Club Stadium; Referee: Mohammed Al-Amri

== Statistics ==
=== Appearances ===
Last updated on 29 May 2023.

No.	Pos	Nat	Player	Total		FD League	
No.	Pos	Nat	Player	Apps	Goals	Apps	Goals
Goalkeepers
1	GK	(Saudi Arabia) KSA	Yasser Al-Mosailem	3	0	2+1	0
21	GK	(Saudi Arabia) KSA	Emad Fida	0	0	0	0
22	GK	(Saudi Arabia) KSA	Abdulrahman Al-Sanbi	8	0	7+1	0
31	GK	(Saudi Arabia) KSA	Nawaf Shae'an	0	0	0	0
62	GK	(Saudi Arabia) KSA	Abdullah Abdoh	0	0	0	0
71	GK	(Saudi Arabia) KSA	Mohammed Al-Rubaie	25	0	25	0
Defenders
2	DF	(Saudi Arabia) KSA	Fahad Al-Hamad	20	0	18+2	0
4	DF	(Saudi Arabia) KSA	Talal Al-Absi	17	0	12+5	0
15	DF	(Saudi Arabia) KSA	Ibrahim Al-Zubaidi	25	0	23+2	0
23	DF	(Angola) ANG	Bastos	24	3	24	3
27	DF	(Saudi Arabia) KSA	Ali Majrashi	21	0	20+1	0
28	DF	(Saudi Arabia) KSA	Ahmed Al-Nakhli	0	0	0	0
37	DF	(Saudi Arabia) KSA	Abdulbasit Hindi	21	0	16+5	0
38	DF	(Saudi Arabia) KSA	Naif Kariri	10	0	5+5	0
41	DF	(Saudi Arabia) KSA	Manaf Abo Yabes	4	0	0+4	0
46	DF	(Saudi Arabia) KSA	Rayane Hamidou	16	0	11+5	0
66	DF	(Saudi Arabia) KSA	Abdulrahman Al-Zahrani	3	0	1+2	0
97	DF	(Saudi Arabia) KSA	Adel Khodari	0	0	0	0
99	DF	(Saudi Arabia) KSA	Mansour Al-Shammari	3	0	1+2	0
Midfielders
7	MF	(Netherlands) NED	Hicham Faik	27	3	22+5	3
9	MF	(Algeria) ALG	Ryad Boudebouz	27	9	24+3	9
10	MF	(Saudi Arabia) KSA	Salman Al-Moasher	20	1	9+11	1
14	MF	(Saudi Arabia) KSA	Firas Al-Ghamdi	5	0	1+4	0
16	MF	(Uruguay) URU	Nicolás Milesi	15	0	14+1	0
29	MF	(Saudi Arabia) KSA	Mohammed Al-Majhad	23	0	13+10	0
30	MF	(Saudi Arabia) KSA	Ziyad Al-Johani	22	2	12+10	2
32	MF	(Saudi Arabia) KSA	Eyad Madani	14	0	8+6	0
40	MF	(Saudi Arabia) KSA	Ali Al-Asmari	11	1	3+8	1
92	MF	(The Gambia) GAM	Modou Barrow	17	3	14+3	3
Forwards
17	FW	(Saudi Arabia) KSA	Haitham Asiri	33	10	31+2	10
18	FW	(Saudi Arabia) KSA	Thamer Al-Ali	12	0	3+9	0
19	FW	(Saudi Arabia) KSA	Sultan Al-Suraihi	1	0	0+1	0
24	FW	(Saudi Arabia) KSA	Morad Khodari	9	2	0+9	2
70	FW	(Saudi Arabia) KSA	Abdullah Al-Mogren	24	6	17+7	6
77	FW	(Saudi Arabia) KSA	Hassan Al-Ali	28	6	16+12	6
94	FW	(Brazil) BRA	Marcão	11	1	1+10	1
Players sent out on loan this season
13	DF	(Saudi Arabia) KSA	Hani Al-Sebyani	0	0	0	0
Player who made an appearance this season but have left the club
6	MF	(Cameroon) CMR	Franck Kom	14	0	14	0
8	FW	(England) ENG	Lewis Grabban	5	1	4+1	1
11	FW	(Tunisia) TUN	Youssef Abdelli	6	0	3+3	0

=== Goalscorers ===
Rank	No.	Pos	Nat	Name	FD League	Total
1	17	FW	(Saudi Arabia)	Haitham Asiri	10	10
2	9	MF	(Algeria)	Ryad Boudebouz	9	9
3	70	FW	(Saudi Arabia)	Abdullah Al-Mogren	6	6
3	77	FW	(Saudi Arabia)	Hassan Al-Ali	6	6
5	7	MF	(Netherlands)	Hicham Faik	3	3
5	23	DF	(Angola)	Bastos	3	3
5	92	MF	(The Gambia)	Modou Barrow	3	3
8	24	FW	(Saudi Arabia)	Morad Khodari	2	2
8	30	MF	(Saudi Arabia)	Ziyad Al-Johani	2	2
10	8	FW	(England)	Lewis Grabban	1	1
10	10	MF	(Saudi Arabia)	Salman Al-Moasher	1	1
10	40	MF	(Saudi Arabia)	Ali Al-Asmari	1	1
10	94	FW	(Brazil)	Marcão	1	1
Own goal					0	0
Total					48	48

Last Updated: 29 May 2023

=== Assists ===
Rank	No.	Pos	Nat	Name	FD League	Total
1	9	MF	(Algeria)	Ryad Boudebouz	9	9
2	92	MF	(The Gambia)	Modou Barrow	5	5
3	17	FW	(Saudi Arabia)	Haitham Asiri	4	4
3	77	FW	(Saudi Arabia)	Hassan Al-Ali	4	4
5	7	MF	(Netherlands)	Hicham Faik	2	2
5	27	DF	(Saudi Arabia)	Ali Majrashi	2	2
7	4	DF	(Saudi Arabia)	Talal Al-Absi	1	1
7	11	FW	(Tunisia)	Youssef Abdelli	1	1
7	18	FW	(Saudi Arabia)	Thamer Al-Ali	1	1
7	29	MF	(Saudi Arabia)	Mohammed Al-Majhad	1	1
7	40	MF	(Saudi Arabia)	Ali Al-Asmari	1	1
Total					31	31

Last Updated: 29 May 2023

=== Clean sheets ===
Rank	No.	Pos	Nat	Name	FD League	Total
1	71	GK	(Saudi Arabia)	Mohammed Al-Rubaie	14	14
2	22	GK	(Saudi Arabia)	Abdulrahman Al-Sanbi	4	4
3	1	GK	(Saudi Arabia)	Yasser Al-Mosailem	1	1
Total					18	18

Last Updated: 29 May 2023
