= Haitham Asiri =

Saudi Arabian footballer (born 2001)

Personal information
- Full name: Haitham Mohammed Ali Abu Hawi Asiri
- Date of birth: 25 March 2001 (age 25)
- Place of birth: Muhayil, Saudi Arabia
- Height: 1.74 m (5 ft 9 in)
- Position: Winger

Team information
- Current team: Al-Qadsiah
- Number: 19

Youth career
- Al-Ahli

Senior career*
Years	Team	Apps	(Gls)
2020–2024	Al-Ahli	69	(13)
2024–	Al-Qadsiah	18	(0)

International career
2018–2020	Saudi Arabia U20		
2021–	Saudi Arabia U23		
2021–2023	Saudi Arabia	10	(1)
Medal record
Men's football
Representing Saudi Arabia
Islamic Solidarity Games
Silver medal – second place	2021 Konya
- * Club domestic league appearances and goals as of 30 October 2026

Haitham Mohammed Ali Abu Hawi Asiri (Arabic: هَيْثَم مُحَمَّد عَلِيّ أَبُو حَاوِيّ عَسِيرِيّ; born 25 March 2001) is a Saudi Arabian professional footballer who plays as a winger for Al-Qadsiah.

== Career ==
On 3 September 2024, Asiri joined Al-Qadsiah on a four-year deal.

He has also represented Saudi Arabia in the U20 and U23 national sides.

== Career statistics ==
=== Club ===
As of match played 3 September 2024

Club	Season	League			King Cup		Continental		Other		Total	
Club	Season	Division	Apps	Goals	Apps	Goals	Apps	Goals	Apps	Goals	Apps	Goals
Al-Ahli	2019–20	SPL	2	1	0	0	5 (Note: Appearances in AFC Champions League)	0	–		7	1
Al-Ahli	2020–21	SPL	5	0	0	0	2	1	–		7	1
Al-Ahli	2021–22	SPL	22	2	2	0	–		–		24	2
Al-Ahli	2022–23	FDL	33	10	–		–		–		33	10
Al-Ahli	2023–24	SPL	6	0	1	0	–		–		7	0
Al-Ahli	2024–25	SPL	1	0	0	0	0	0	0	0	1	0
Al-Ahli	Total		69	13	3	0	7	1	0	0	79	14
Al-Qadsiah	2024–25	SPL	0	0	0	0	–		–		0	0
Career total			69	13	3	0	7	1	0	0	79	14

=== International ===
Scores and results list Saudi Arabia's goal tally first.

No.	Date	Venue	Opponent	Score	Result	Competition
1.	10 November 2022	Sheikh Zayed Cricket Stadium, Abu Dhabi, United Arab Emirates	Panama	1–1	1–1	Friendly

== Honours ==
Al-Ahli

- Saudi First Division League: 2022–23

Saudi Arabia U-23

- AFC U-23 Asian Cup: 2022
