= Abdulbasit Hindi =

Saudi Arabian footballer (born 1997)

Personal information
- Full name: Abdulbasit Mohammed Hindi
- Date of birth: 2 February 1997 (age 29)
- Place of birth: Sabya, Saudi Arabia
- Height: 1.84 m (6 ft 0 in)
- Position: Centre-back

Team information
- Current team: Al-Ettifaq
- Number: 37

Youth career
- –2013: Al-Amjad
- 2013–2018: Al-Ahli

Senior career*
Years	Team	Apps	(Gls)
2018–2024	Al-Ahli	108	(6)
2024–	Al-Ettifaq	0	(0)

International career
2016–2017	Saudi Arabia U20		
2018–2021	Saudi Arabia U23		
- * Club domestic league appearances and goals as of 23 May 2024

Abdulbasit Mohammed Hindi (Arabic: عبد الباسط محمد هندي, romanized: ʿAbdalbāsiṭ Mohammed Hindī; born 2 February 1997) is a Saudi Arabian footballer who plays as a centre-back for Saudi Pro League side Al-Ettifaq. He started his international career with the Saudi Arabian U20 team in 2016–17, continuing on to the national U23 team.

== Club career ==
Born in Sabya, Abdulbasit Hindi he is from Saudi descent that belongs to Jizan families. He started his career at Al-Amjad before joining Al-Ahli in 2013. On 6 September 2016, Hindi signed his first professional contract with Al-Ahli. On 25 August 2018, Hindi made his debut for Al-Ahli in the Arab Club Champions Cup match against Al-Muharraq. On 17 September 2018, Hindi renewed his contract with Al-Ahli. On 25 October 2018, Hindi made his league debut as 74th-minute substitute in a 5–1 win against Al-Fateh. On 9 November 2018, Hindi made his first start for Al-Ahli in a 2–0 defeat to Al-Qadsiah. On 5 October 2019, Hindi scored his first goal for Al-Ahli in a 3–0 win against Al-Fayha. On 29 July 2022, Hindi renewed his contract with Al-Ahli until the end of the 2024–25 season. On 3 September 2024, Hindi joined Al-Ettifaq on a three-year contract.

== Career statistics ==
=== Club ===
As of 30 May 2024

Club	Season	League		King Cup		Asia		Other		Total	
Club	Season	Apps	Goals	Apps	Goals	Apps	Goals	Apps	Goals	Apps	Goals
Al-Ahli	2018–19	11	0	1	0	5	0	7 (Note: Appearances in Arab Club Champions Cup)	0	24	0
Al-Ahli	2019–20	13	3	1	0	5	0	—		19	3
Al-Ahli	2020–21	12	0	1	0	6	0	—		19	0
Al-Ahli	2021–22	27	1	2	0	—		—		29	1
Al-Ahli	2022–23	21	0	—		—		—		21	0
Al-Ahli	2023–24	24	2	1	0	—		—		25	2
Al-Ahli	2024–25	0	0	0	0	0	0	1 (Note: Appearances in Saudi Super Cup)	0	1	0
Al-Ahli	Total	108	6	6	0	16	0	8	0	138	6
Al-Ettifaq	2024–25	0	0	0	0	—		0	0	0	0
Career totals		108	6	6	0	16	0	8	0	138	6
