= Ali Al-Asmari =

Saudi Arabian footballer (born 1997)

Personal information
- Full name: Ali Hassan Al-Asmari
- Date of birth: 12 January 1997 (age 29)
- Place of birth: Jeddah, Saudi Arabia
- Height: 1.85 m (6 ft 1 in)
- Position: Midfielder

Team information
- Current team: Al-Shabab (on loan from Neom)
- Number: 40

Youth career
- Al-Ahli

Senior career*
Years	Team	Apps	(Gls)
2017–2025	Al-Ahli	96	(4)
2018–2019	→ Ohod (loan)	21	(1)
2025–	Neom	29	(0)
2026–	→ Al-Shabab (loan)	20	(0)

International career^{‡}
2016–2017	Saudi Arabia U20	9	(0)
2018–2020	Saudi Arabia U23	4	(0)
2021–	Saudi Arabia	5	(0)
- * Club domestic league appearances and goals as of 30 October 2026 ‡ National team caps and goals as of 15 October 2024

Ali Al-Asmari (Arabic: علي الأسمري; born 12 January 1997) is a Saudi Arabian footballer who plays as a midfielder for Saudi Arabian club Al-Shabab, on loan from Neom and the Saudi Arabia national team.

== Career statistics ==
=== Club ===
As of 30 January 2025

Club	Season	League		King Cup		Asia		Other		Total	
Club	Season	Apps	Goals	Apps	Goals	Apps	Goals	Apps	Goals	Apps	Goals
Al-Ahli	2017–18	4	0	0	0	2	0	—		6	0
Al-Ahli	2019–20	19	2	2	0	7	0	—		28	2
Al-Ahli	2020–21	25	0	0	0	4	0	—		29	0
Al-Ahli	2021–22	14	0	1	0	—		—		15	0
Al-Ahli	2022–23	11	1	—		—		—		11	1
Al-Ahli	2023–24	13	0	2	0	—		—		15	0
Al-Ahli	2024–25	10	1	0	0	2	0	0	0	12	1
Al-Ahli	Total	96	4	5	0	15	0	0	0	116	4
Ohod (loan)	2018–19	21	1	2	1	—		—		23	2
Career totals		117	5	7	1	15	0	0	0	139	6
