= Mohammed Al-Rubaie =

Saudi Arabian footballer (born 1997)

Personal information
- Full name: Mohammed Faraj Saeed Al-Rubaie Al-Yami
- Date of birth: 14 August 1997 (age 29)
- Place of birth: Najran, Saudi Arabia
- Height: 1.90 m (6 ft 3 in)
- Position: Goalkeeper

Team information
- Current team: Al-Hilal
- Number: 17

Youth career
- –2013: Al-Akhdoud
- 2013–2018: Al-Ahli

Senior career*
| Years | Team | Apps | (Gls) |
| 2018–2024 | Al-Ahli | 51 | (0) |
| 2018–2019 | → Al-Batin (loan) | 6 | (0) |
| 2024– | Al-Hilal | 10 | (0) |

International career^{‡}
| 2016 | Saudi Arabia U19 | 3 | (0) |
| 2017 | Saudi Arabia U20 | 1 | (0) |
| 2018–2021 | Saudi Arabia U23 | 4 | (0) |
| 2020– | Saudi Arabia | 7 | (0) |
- * Club domestic league appearances and goals as of 20:41, 25 January 2026 (UTC) ‡ National team caps and goals as of 18:58, 30 October 2022 (UTC)

Mohammed Faraj Saeed Al-Rubaie Al-Yami (Arabic: مُحَمَّد فَرَج سَعِيد الرَّبِيعِيّ الْيَامِي; born 14 August 1997), commonly known as Mohammed Al-Rubaie or Mohammed Al-Yami, is a Saudi Arabian footballer who plays as a goalkeeper for Al-Hilal and the Saudi Arabia national team.

== Personal life ==
Mohammed is the brother of Masoud Al-Rubaie and the cousin of Hamad Al-Rabaei, Saeed Al-Rubaie and Abdullah Al-Rubaie.

== Club career ==
On 17 May 2013, Al-Rubaie joined Al-Ahli from Al-Akhdoud. On 2 August 2018, Al-Rubaie joined Al-Batin on loan until the end of the 2018–19 season. Al-Rubaie made his professional debut for Al-Batin in the Saudi Professional League on 19 October 2018, coming on as a substitute in the 72nd minute for Adriano Facchini in the 0–2 home loss against Al-Nassr. He went on to make six more appearances in all competitions.

On 28 January 2020, Al-Rubaie renewed his contract with Al-Ahli for another four seasons. He made his debut for Al-Ahli on 4 September 2020, coming on as a substitute in the 11th minute for Yasser Al-Mosailem in the 2–1 away loss against Abha. On 22 October 2020, Al-Rubaie made his first start for Al-Ahli and kept a clean sheet in the 1–0 win against Al-Wehda. On 21 January 2021, Al-Rubaie was injured in the league match against Abha and was replaced by Yasser Al-Mosailem. Al-Rubaie started the last four games of the 2020–21 season following an injury to first-choice goalkeeper Mohammed Al-Owais.

On 30 August 2023, Al-Rubaie signed a pre-contract agreement with Al-Hilal. He signed a four-year deal with the club. He joined the club following the expiration of his contract on 28 January 2024.

== International career ==
Al-Rubaie was included in Saudi Arabia's squad for the 2019 AFC Asian Cup in the United Arab Emirates. On 20 November 2019, Al-Rubaie was named in the squad for the 24th Arabian Gulf Cup. On 6 July 2021, Al-Rubaie was named in the squad for the 2020 Olympics. On 18 November 2021, Al-Rubaie was named in the squad for the 2021 FIFA Arab Cup. On 11 November 2022, Al-Rubaie was named in the squad for the 2022 FIFA World Cup.

== Career statistics ==
=== Club ===
As of match played 28 January 2024

| Club | Season | League | | National Cup | | Continental | | Other | | Total | |
| Club | Season | Apps | Goals | Apps | Goals | Apps | Goals | Apps | Goals | Apps | Goals |
|---|---|---|---|---|---|---|---|---|---|---|---|
| Al-Batin (loan) | 2018–19 | 6 | 0 | 1 | 0 | — | | — | | 7 | 0 |
| Al-Ahli | 2019–20 | 1 | 0 | 1 | 0 | 0 | 0 | — | | 2 | 0 |
| Al-Ahli | 2020–21 | 7 | 0 | 0 | 0 | 0 | 0 | — | | 7 | 0 |
| Al-Ahli | 2021–22 | 18 | 0 | 2 | 0 | — | | — | | 20 | 0 |
| Al-Ahli | 2022–23 | 25 | 0 | — | | — | | — | | 25 | 0 |
| Al-Ahli | 2023–24 | 0 | 0 | 0 | 0 | — | | — | | 0 | 0 |
| Al-Ahli | Total | 51 | 0 | 3 | 0 | 0 | 0 | 0 | 0 | 54 | 0 |
| Career totals | | 57 | 0 | 4 | 0 | 0 | 0 | 0 | 0 | 61 | 0 |

== Honours ==
Al Hilal

- Saudi Pro League: 2023–24
- Saudi Super Cup: 2024
