= Ahmed Al-Nakhli =

Saudi Arabian footballer

Personal information
- Full name: Ahmed Hussain Kassarah Al-Nakhli
- Date of birth: 22 March 2002 (age 24)
- Place of birth: Jeddah, Saudi Arabia
- Height: 1.73 m (5 ft 8 in)
- Position: Left back

Team information
- Current team: Al-Hazem
- Number: 27

Youth career
- –2020: Al-Ahli

Senior career*
Years	Team	Apps	(Gls)
2020–2024	Al-Ahli	1	(0)
2023–2024	→ Al-Kholood (loan)	12	(0)
2024–	Al-Hazem	31	(2)
- * Club domestic league appearances and goals as of 11 September 2026

Ahmed Al-Nakhli (Arabic: أحمد النخلي; born 22 March 2002), is a Saudi Arabian professional footballer who plays as a left back for Al-Hazem.

== Career ==
Al-Nakhli began his career at the youth teams of Al-Ahli. He made his debut for Al-Ahli on 23 September 2020 in the AFC Champions League group stage match against Iranian side Esteghlal. On 25 October 2020, Al-Nakhli signed his first professional contract with Al-Ahli. On 2 September 2023, Al-Nakhli made his league debut for Al-Ahli in a 5–1 defeat to Al-Fateh. He came off the bench replacing Ibrahim Al-Zubaidi at half-time. On 10 September 2023, Al-Nakhli joined First Division side Al-Kholood on loan.

== Career statistics ==
=== Club ===
As of 28 May 2024.

Club	Season	League			Cup		Continental		Other		Total	
Club	Season	Division	Apps	Goals	Apps	Goals	Apps	Goals	Apps	Goals	Apps	Goals
Al-Ahli	2019–20	SPL	0	0	0	0	1	0	—		1	0
Al-Ahli	2022–23	FDL	0	0	—		—		—		0	0
Al-Ahli	2023–24	SPL	1	0	0	0	—		—		1	0
Al-Ahli	Total		1	0	0	0	1	0	0	0	2	0
Al-Kholood (loan)	2023–24	FDL	12	0	1	0	—		—		13	0
Career total			13	0	1	0	1	0	0	0	15	0
