= Lucas Lima (footballer, born 1991) =

Brazilian footballer

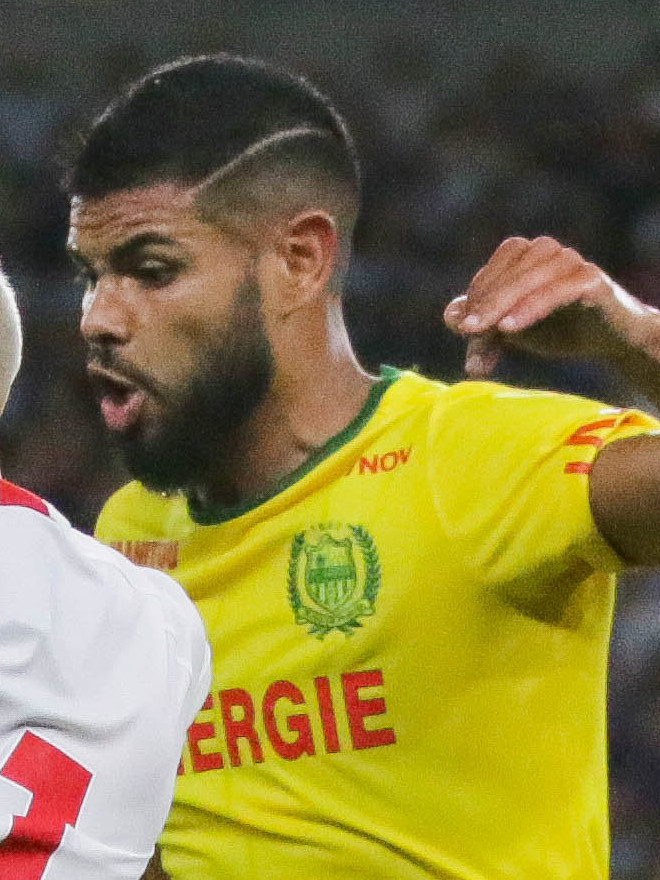
- Lima with Nantes in 2018

Personal information
- Full name: Lucas Pedro Alves de Lima
- Date of birth: 10 October 1991 (age 35)
- Place of birth: Estação, Brazil
- Height: 1.79 m (5 ft 10 in)
- Position: Left-back

Team information
- Current team: Bandırmaspor
- Number: 3

Youth career
- 2005–2006: Grêmio
- 2007–2009: Criciúma
- 2009–2011: Internacional

Senior career*
Years	Team	Apps	(Gls)
2009	Criciúma	2	(0)
2010–2012	Internacional	0	(0)
2011	→ Paraná (loan)	33	(5)
2012–2015	Botafogo	18	(0)
2014	→ Goiás (loan)	21	(0)
2015	ABC	7	(0)
2015–2016	Arouca	31	(4)
2016–2019	Nantes	105	(3)
2019–2021	Al-Ahli	50	(1)
2021–2025	İstanbul Başakşehir	110	(2)
2025–2026	Boluspor	34	(2)
2026–	Bandırmaspor	0	(0)
- * Club domestic league appearances and goals as of 6 May 2026

Lucas Pedro Alves de Lima (born 10 October 1991), known as Lucas Lima, is a Brazilian professional footballer who plays as a left-back for Turkish TFF 1. Lig club Bandırmaspor.

== Career ==
Lucas Lima made his senior debut for Criciúma in the Série C in a match against Marília at the Estádio Heriberto Hülse on 24 May 2009. Later that year, Lima was signed by Internacional. In 2011, he was sent on loan to Série B side Paraná where he spent his first senior season. After not being able to establish himself at Internacional, and making only two first-team appearances, he moved on to Botafogo. Lima was part of the squad that won the Campeonato Carioca in 2013 and qualified Botafogo for the 2014 Copa Libertadores after 18 years absence of the tournament.

On 24 January 2014, Goiás signed Lima on a season-long loan deal. In early 2015, he rescinded his contract due to unpaid wages, and signed a one-year deal with ABC.

On 16 June 2015, Arouca announced they had agreed a deal with Lima signing a two-year contract.

== Honours ==
Internacional

- Campeonato Gaúcho: 2012

Botafogo

- Campeonato Carioca: 2013
