= Abdulrahman Ghareeb =

Saudi Arabian footballer (born 1997)

Abdulrahman Ghareeb عَبْد الرَّحْمٰن غَرِيب
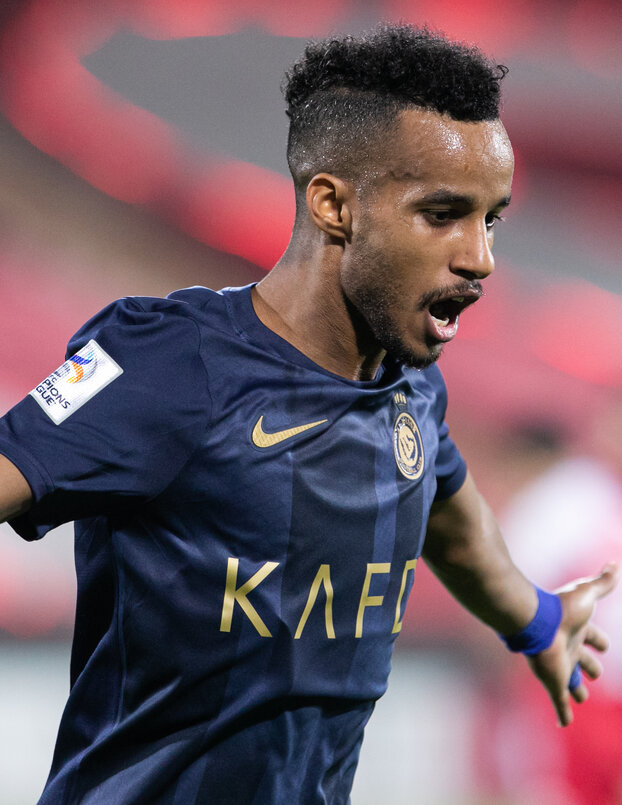
- Ghareeb with Al-Nassr in 2023

Personal information
- Full name: Abdulrahman Abdullah Ghareeb
- Date of birth: 31 March 1997 (age 29)
- Place of birth: Jeddah, Saudi Arabia
- Height: 1.60 m (5 ft 3 in)
- Position: Winger

Team information
- Current team: Al-Nassr
- Number: 29

Youth career
- 2011–2018: Al-Ahli

Senior career*
Years	Team	Apps	(Gls)
2017–2022	Al-Ahli	93	(13)
2022–	Al-Nassr	97	(12)

International career^{‡}
2016–2018	Saudi Arabia U20	3	(1)
2017–2021	Saudi Arabia U23	5	(2)
2018–	Saudi Arabia	32	(4)
- * Club domestic league appearances and goals as of 20 November 2026 ‡ National team caps and goals as of 10 October 2024

Abdulrahman Abdullah Ghareeb (Arabic: عَبْد الرَّحْمٰن عَبْد الله غَرِيب; born 31 March 1997) is a Saudi Arabian professional footballer who plays as a winger for Saudi Pro League club Al-Nassr and the Saudi Arabia national team.

== Club career ==
=== Al-Ahli ===
Ghareeb is an academy graduate of Al-Ahli. He was first called up to the first team in December 2017, due to injuries to multiple first-team players. He signed his first professional contract on 17 September 2018.

=== Al-Nassr ===
In August 2022, Ghareeb joined Al-Nassr on a four-year contract for a reported fee of SAR22 million. In September 2026, he re-signed with the club until 2028.

== Career statistics ==
=== Club ===
As of match played 31 May 2024

Club	Season	League			King Cup		Continental		Other		Total	
Club	Season	Division	Apps	Goals	Apps	Goals	Apps	Goals	Apps	Goals	Apps	Goals
Al-Ahli	2017–18	Saudi Pro League	1	0	0	0	1 (Note: Appearance(s) in AFC Champions League)	0	—		2	0
Al-Ahli	2018–19	Saudi Pro League	18	1	1	0	6	1	3 (Note: Appearances in Arab Club Champions Cup)	3	28	5
Al-Ahli	2019–20	Saudi Pro League	19	2	0	0	7	0	—		28	3
Al-Ahli	2020–21	Saudi Pro League	26	6	1	0	6	2	—		33	8
Al-Ahli	2021–22	Saudi Pro League	29	4	2	0	—		—		31	4
Al-Ahli	Total		93	13	4	0	20	3	3	3	120	19
Al-Nassr	2022–23	Saudi Pro League	27	6	2	0	—		1 (Note: Appearance in Saudi Super Cup)	0	30	6
Al-Nassr	2023–24	Saudi Pro League	27	4	4	1	7	2	6 1	0	45	7
Al-Nassr	Total		54	10	6	1	7	2	8	0	75	13
Career total			147	23	10	1	27	5	11	3	195	32

=== International ===
Statistics accurate as of matches played as of 10 October 2024.

Saudi Arabia
Year	Apps	Goals
2018	5	1
2019	4	0
2020	0	0
2021	4	0
2022	2	0
2023	6	1
2024	11	2
Total	32	4

As of 16 January 2024

Scores and results list Saudi Arabia's goal tally first.

International goals by date, venue, cap, opponent, score, result and competition
No.	Date	Venue	Cap	Opponent	Score	Result	Competition
1	16 November 2018	Prince Mohamed bin Fahd Stadium, Dammam, Saudi Arabia	3	Yemen	1–0	1–0	Friendly
2	16 November 2023	Prince Abdullah bin Jalawi Stadium, Hofuf, Saudi Arabia	20	Pakistan	3–0	4–0	2026 FIFA World Cup qualification
3	10 January 2024	Saoud bin Abdulrahman Stadium, Al-Wakrah, Qatar	21	Hong Kong	1–0	2–0	Friendly
4	16 January 2024	Khalifa International Stadium, Al Rayyan, Qatar	22	Oman	1–1	2–1	2023 AFC Asian Cup

== Honours ==
Al-Nassr

- Saudi Pro League: 2025–26
- Arab Club Champions Cup: 2023

Individual

- Saudi Pro League Player of the Month: October 2021
- Saudi Pro League Young Player of the Month: February 2021
