= Ahmed Bassas =

Saudi Arabian footballer

Personal information
- Full name: Ahmed Mazin Bassas
- Date of birth: 22 March 2001 (age 25)
- Place of birth: Saudi Arabia
- Position: Midfielder

Youth career
- –2020: Al-Ahli

Senior career*
Years	Team	Apps	(Gls)
2020–2024	Al-Ahli	1	(0)

International career
2020	Saudi Arabia U20		
- * Club domestic league appearances and goals

Ahmed Bassas (Arabic: أحمد بصاص; born 22 March 2001), is a Saudi Arabian professional footballer who plays as a midfielder.

== Career statistics ==
=== Club ===
As of 27 September 2020.

Club	Season	League			Cup		Continental		Other		Total	
Club	Season	Division	Apps	Goals	Apps	Goals	Apps	Goals	Apps	Goals	Apps	Goals
Al-Ahli	2019–20	Saudi Professional League	0	0	0	0	1	0	0	0	1	0
Career total			0	0	0	0	1	0	0	0	1	0
