= Prince Mohammed Abdullah Al-Faisal Stadium =

Sports venue in Jeddah, Saudi Arabia

Prince Mohammed bin Abdullah Al Faisal Stadium
- Interactive map of Prince Mohammed bin Abdullah Al Faisal Stadium
- Former names: Prince Sultan bin Fahd Stadium
- Location: Jeddah, Saudi Arabia
- Coordinates: 21.567158°N 39.173727°E
- Owner: General Presidency of Youth Welfare
- Capacity: 10,000
- Surface: GrassMaster

Construction
- Opened: 1987

Prince Mohammed bin Abdullah Al Faisal Stadium, previously known as the Prince Sultan bin Fahd Stadium, is a multi-purpose stadium in Jeddah, Saudi Arabia. The stadium has a capacity of 10,000 people and opened in 1987. In October 2011 it was renamed as Prince Mohammed bin Abdullah Al Faisal Stadium as a tribute to Prince Mohammed bin Abdullah, one of the former presidents of Al Ahli club. It is used mostly for football matches.
