= Al-Zubaidi =

Al-Zubaidi is an Arab surname. They are one of the largest Arab families. Notable people with the surname include:

- Aidarus al-Zubaidi (born 1967), Yemeni leader
- Ali Al-Zubaidi (footballer, born 1993), Saudi footballer
- Ibrahim Al-Zubaidi (born 1989), Saudi footballer
- Kais al-Zubaidi (1939–2024), Iraqi filmmaker, director, writer, and researcher
- Mohammed Al-Zubaidi (born 1997), Saudi footballer
