= Ayman Al-Khulaif =

Saudi Arabian footballer (born 1997)

Personal information
- Full name: Ayman Shafiq Al-Khulaif
- Date of birth: 22 May 1997 (age 29)
- Place of birth: Al-Hasa, Saudi Arabia
- Height: 1.66 m (5 ft 5 in)
- Position: Midfielder

Team information
- Current team: Al-Ula
- Number: 7

Youth career
- –2015: Hajer
- 2015–2017: Al-Ahli

Senior career*
Years	Team	Apps	(Gls)
2017–2019	Al-Ahli	6	(0)
2019–2022	Al-Wehda	31	(1)
2022–2023	Al-Fateh	30	(4)
2023–2024	Al-Qadsiah	26	(3)
2024–	Al-Ula	0	(0)

International career^{‡}
2016–2017	Saudi Arabia U20	10	(2)
2018–2021	Saudi Arabia U23		
2018–	Saudi Arabia	2	(0)
- * Club domestic league appearances and goals as of 28 May 2024 ‡ National team caps and goals as of 17 January 2019

Ayman Al-Khulaif (born 22 May 1997) is a Saudi Arabian footballer who plays as a midfielder for Al-Ula and the Saudi Arabia national team.

== Career ==
On 24 July 2023, Al-Khulaif joined Al-Qadsiah. On 3 September 2024, Al-Khulaif joined Al-Ula on a two-year deal.

== Honours ==
Al-Qadsiah

- First Division League: 2023–24
