= Basem Atallah =

Saudi Arabian footballer

Personal information
- Full name: Basem Atallah Al-Baqqi
- Date of birth: 11 July 1989 (age 37)
- Place of birth: Ha'il, Saudi Arabia
- Height: 1.88 m (6 ft 2 in)
- Position: Goalkeeper

Youth career
- ????–2009: Al-Ta'ee

Senior career*
| Years | Team | Apps | (Gls) |
| 2009–2011 | Al-Ta'ee | ? | (0) |
| 2011–2020 | Al-Ahli | 3 | (0) |
| 2014–2015 | → Al-Taawoun (loan) | 21 | (0) |
| 2020–2023 | Al-Wehda | 0 | (0) |
| 2024 | Al-Arabi | 0 | (0) |
- * Club domestic league appearances and goals

Basem Atallah Al-Baqqi (Arabic: باسم عطا الله البقي; born 11 July 1989) is a Saudi Arabian professional footballer who currently plays as a goalkeeper.

== Honours ==
=== Club ===
- Al-Ahli

- Saudi Champions Cup: 2012, 2016
- Saudi Professional League: 2015–16
