= Saeed Al-Muwallad =

Saudi Arabian footballer

Personal information
- Full name: Saeed Fawaz Saeed Al-Muwallad
- Date of birth: 9 March 1991 (age 35)
- Place of birth: Jeddah, Saudi Arabia
- Height: 1.84 m (6 ft 0 in)
- Position: Right back

Team information
- Current team: Al-Wehda
- Number: 2

Senior career*
Years	Team	Apps	(Gls)
2012–2015	Al-Ahli	25	(0)
2015–2016	S.C. Farense	17	(0)
2016–2017	Al-Raed	12	(2)
2017–2021	Al-Ahli	75	(1)
2021–2023	Al-Ettifaq	54	(0)
2023–	Al-Wehda	26	(1)

International career^{‡}
2012–2014	Saudi Arabia U23		
2014–2018	Saudi Arabia	16	(0)
- * Club domestic league appearances and goals as of 22:12, 27 May 2024 (UTC) ‡ National team caps and goals as of 22:55, 15 October 2018 (UTC)

Saeed Al-Muwallad (Arabic: سعيد المولد; born 9 March 1991) is a Saudi professional footballer who currently plays as a right back for Al-Wehda.

In May 2018 he was named in Saudi Arabia’s preliminary squad for the 2018 World Cup in Russia.

== Career statistics ==
=== International ===
Statistics accurate as of match played 12 October 2018.

Saudi Arabia
Year	Apps	Goals
2014	6	0
2015	1	0
2017	3	0
2018	6	0
Total	16	0

== Honours ==
=== Club ===
Al-Ahli

Runner-up

- AFC Champions League: 2012
- King Cup of Champions: 2014
