= 2013–14 Saudi Pro League =

Professional League
- Season: 2013–2014
- Dates: 23 August 2013 – 6 April 2014
- Champions: Al-Nassr (7th title)
- Relegated: Al-Ettifaq; Al-Nahda
- AFC Champions League: Al-Nassr; Al-Shabab; Al-Hilal; Al-Ahli
- GCC Champions League: Al-Taawoun; Al-Faisaly
- Matches: 182
- Goals: 515 (2.83 per match)
- Best Player: Mohammad Al-Sahlawi
- Top goalscorer: Nasser Al-Shamrani (21 goals)
- Biggest home win: Al-Shabab 6–0 Al-Nahda (24 November 2013); Al-Hilal 6–0 Al-Nahda (28 March 2014)
- Biggest away win: Najran 0–5 Al-Ahli (28 March 2014)
- Highest scoring: Al-Ittihad 4–4 Al-Nahda (7 November 2013)
- Longest winning run: 13 games Al-Nassr
- Longest unbeaten run: 22 games Al-Nassr
- Longest winless run: 17 games Al-Nahda
- Longest losing run: 6 games Al-Shoulla
- Highest attendance: 52,551; Al-Taawoun 1–1 Al-Nassr (6 April 2014)
- Lowest attendance: 0 (spectator ban); Al-Ahli 4–0 Al-Fateh (14 February 2014)
- Average attendance: 4,910

The 2013–14 Saudi Professional League (known as the Abdul Latif Jameel Professional League for sponsorship reasons) was the 38th season of the Saudi Pro League, the top Saudi professional league for association football clubs, since its establishment in 1976. The season began on 23 August 2013 and ended on 6 April 2014. Al-Fateh were the defending champions having won their first title last season. The league was contested by the 12 teams from the 2012–13 season as well as Al-Nahda and Al-Orobah, who joined as the promoted clubs from the 2012–13 First Division. They replace Al-Wehda and Hajer who were relegated to the 2013–14 First Division.

On 28 March, Al-Nassr secured their seventh league title with one game to spare after a 1–1 draw away to Al-Shabab. This was Al-Nassr's first league title since the 1994–95 season.

Al-Nahda were the first team to be relegated following a 2–2 home draw with Al-Orobah on 22 March. Al-Ettifaq became the second and final team to be relegated following a 2–1 defeat away to Al-Ahli on the final matchday. Al-Ettifaq were relegated for the first time in history after 37 consecutive seasons in the top flight.

== Name sponsorship ==
On 14 April 2013, it was that the Abdul Latif Jameel group had signed a six-year sponsorship contract with the SAFF. Starting from the 2013–14 season, the league would be known as the Abdul Latif Jameel Professional League. It was later announced that the sponsorship deal cost SAR720 million in total, SAR120 million a year. The previous sponsor, Zain, opted not to renew their contract following its expiration.

== Teams ==
Fourteen teams competed in the league – the twelve teams from the previous season and the two teams promoted from the First Division. The promoted teams were Al-Orobah (playing in the top flight for the first time ever) and Al-Nahda (returning to the top flight after nineteen years). They replaced Hajer (ending their two-year top-flight spell) and Al-Wehda (who were relegated after one season in the top flight).

=== Stadiums and locations ===
Locations of teams in the 2013–14 Saudi Professional League

Note: Table lists in alphabetical order.

Team	Location	Stadium	Capacity
Al-Ahli	Jeddah	King Abdul Aziz Stadium (Mecca) (Note: Al-Ahli and Al-Ittihad played at the King Abdul Aziz Stadium, due to the expansion of the Prince Abdullah Al Faisal Stadium.)	33,195
Al-Ettifaq	Dammam	Prince Mohamed bin Fahd Stadium	21,701
Al-Faisaly	Harmah	Prince Salman Sport City Stadium	5,200
Al-Fateh	Hofuf	Prince Abdullah bin Jalawi Stadium	19,096
Al-Hilal	Riyadh	King Fahd International Stadium; Prince Faisal bin Fahd Stadium	62,685; 22,500
Al-Ittihad	Jeddah	King Abdul Aziz Stadium (Mecca)	33,195
Al-Nahda	Dammam	Prince Mohamed bin Fahd Stadium	21,701
Al-Nassr	Riyadh	King Fahd International Stadium; Prince Faisal bin Fahd Stadium	62,685; 22,500
Al-Orobah	Sakakah	Al-Orobah Club Stadium	6,000
Al-Raed	Buraidah	King Abdullah Sport City Stadium	23,600
Al-Shabab	Riyadh	King Fahd International Stadium; Prince Faisal bin Fahd Stadium	62,685; 22,500
Al-Shoulla	Al-Kharj	Al-Shoulla Club Stadium	8,000
Al-Taawoun	Buraidah	King Abdullah Sport City Stadium	23,600
Najran	Najran	Al Akhdoud Club Stadium	3,200

=== Personnel and kits ===
Team	Manager	Captain	Kit manufacturer	Shirt sponsor
Al-Ahli	(Portugal) Vítor Pereira	(Saudi Arabia) Taisir Al-Jassim	Umbro	ExxonMobil^{2}
Al-Ettifaq	(Romania) Ioan Andone	(Saudi Arabia) Sultan Al-Bargan	Uhlsport	ExxonMobil^{2}
Al-Faisaly	(Italy) Giovanni Solinas	(Saudi Arabia) Omar Abdulaziz	Macron	ALDREES, Roco^{1}
Al-Fateh	(Tunisia) Fathi Al-Jabal	(Saudi Arabia) Hamdan Al-Hamdan	Lotto	Kia Motors, Fuchsia^{1}
Al-Hilal	(Saudi Arabia) Sami Al-Jaber	(Saudi Arabia) Salman Al-Faraj	Nike	Mobily
Al-Ittihad	(Saudi Arabia) Khalid Al-Koroni	(Saudi Arabia) Osama Al-Muwallad	SportONE	ExxonMobil^{2}
Al-Nahda	(Tunisia) Jalel Kadri	(Saudi Arabia) Ahmed Al-Dossari	Adidas	Al-Shuhail Group
Al-Nassr	(Uruguay) José Daniel Carreño	(Saudi Arabia) Hussein Abdulghani	NFC	Nassrawi.com
Al-Orobah	(Tunisia) Jameel Qassem	(Saudi Arabia) Ali Al-Khaibari	Uhlsport	Herfy
Al-Raed	(Belgium) Marc Brys	(Saudi Arabia) Hamad Al-Sagoor	Hattrick	Aljafen Academy, Al Qassim National Hospital^{1}
Al-Shabab	(Tunisia) Ammar Souayah	(Saudi Arabia) Ahmed Otaif	Sporta	STC, Toyota^{1}, ExxonMobil^{2}
Al-Shoulla	(Spain) Juan José Maqueda	(Saudi Arabia) Burj Maodah	Hattrick	
Al-Taawoun	(Algeria) Taoufik Rouabah	(Saudi Arabia) Abdoh Hakami	Macron	Alwasail
Najran	(Syria) Nizar Mahrous	(Saudi Arabia) Hamad Al-Rubaie	Macron	

- ^{1} On the back of the strip.
- ^{2} On the right sleeve of the strip.

=== Managerial changes ===
Team	Outgoing manager	Manner of departure	Date of vacancy	Position in table	Incoming manager	Date of appointment
Al-Ettifaq	(Poland) Maciej Skorża	End of contract	12 May 2013	Pre-season	(Germany) Theo Bücker	19 June 2013
Al-Raed	(North Macedonia) Vlatko Kostov	End of contract	12 May 2013	Pre-season	(Algeria) Noureddine Zekri	26 June 2013
Al-Nahda	(Tunisia) Aymen Makhlouf	End of contract	17 May 2013	Pre-season	(Romania) Ilie Balaci	18 June 2013
Al-Hilal	(Croatia) Zlatko Dalić	End of contract	23 May 2013	Pre-season	(Saudi Arabia) Sami Al-Jaber	1 June 2013
Al-Ahli	(Serbia) Aleksandar Ilić	End of contract	30 May 2013	Pre-season	(Portugal) Vítor Pereira	9 June 2013
Al-Shabab	(Belgium) Michel Preud'homme	Resigned	19 September 2013	4th	(Belgium) Emilio Ferrera	19 September 2013
Al-Nahda	(Romania) Ilie Balaci	Sacked	25 September 2013	14th	(Tunisia) Aymen Makhlouf (caretaker)	25 September 2013
Al-Ettifaq	(Germany) Theo Bücker	Sacked	30 September 2013	12th	(Romania) Eusebiu Tudor (caretaker)	30 September 2013
Al-Nahda	(Tunisia) Aymen Makhlouf (caretaker)	End of caretaker period	7 October 2013	13th	(Tunisia) Jalel Kadri	7 October 2013
Al-Shoulla	(Tunisia) Ahmad Al-Ajlani	Resigned	8 October 2013	14th	(Spain) Juan José Maqueda	12 October 2013
Al-Ettifaq	(Romania) Eusebiu Tudor (caretaker)	End of caretaker period	27 October 2013	11th	(Serbia) Goran Tufegdžić	27 October 2013
Al-Ittihad	(Spain) Beñat San José	Sacked	1 December 2013	8th	(Egypt) Amro Anwar (caretaker)	19 June 2013
Al-Faisaly	(Belgium) Marc Brys	Sacked	7 December 2013	12th	(Morocco) Issame Charaï (caretaker)	7 December 2013
Al-Faisaly	(Morocco) Issame Charaï (caretaker)	End of caretaker period	15 December 2013	12th	(Egypt) Mohammed El Sayed (caretaker)	15 December 2013
Al-Faisaly	(Egypt) Mohammed El Sayed (caretaker)	End of caretaker period	20 December 2013	12th	(Italy) Giovanni Solinas	20 December 2013
Al-Ittihad	(Egypt) Amro Anwar (caretaker)	End of caretaker period	5 January 2014	6th	(Uruguay) Juan Verzeri	5 January 2014
Najran	(North Macedonia) Gjoko Hadžievski	Sacked	9 January 2014	11th	(Syria) Nizar Mahrous	9 January 2014
Al-Shabab	(Belgium) Emilio Ferrera	Sacked	24 January 2014	4th	(Tunisia) Ammar Souayah	24 January 2014
Al-Ettifaq	(Serbia) Goran Tufegdžić	Sacked	9 February 2014	10th	(Romania) Ioan Andone	10 February 2014
Al-Raed	(Algeria) Noureddine Zekri	Sacked	14 February 2014	13th	(Tunisia) Emad Al-Sulami (caretaker)	14 February 2014
Al-Ittihad	(Uruguay) Juan Verzeri	Sacked	28 February 2014	6th	(Saudi Arabia) Khalid Al-Koroni	1 March 2014
Al-Raed	(Tunisia) Emad Al-Sulami (caretaker)	End of caretaker period	2 March 2014	13th	(Belgium) Marc Brys	2 March 2014

=== Foreign players ===
The number of foreign players is restricted to four per team, including a slot for a player from AFC countries.

Players name in bold indicates the player is registered during the mid-season transfer window.

Club	Player 1	Player 2	Player 3	AFC player	Former players
Al-Ahli	(Brazil) **Eric**	(Brazil) Márcio Mossoró	(São Tomé and Príncipe) **Luís Leal**	(South Korea) Suk Hyun-jun	(Brazil) **Ruy Netto** (Brazil) Victor Simões (Iraq) Younis Mahmoud
Al-Ettifaq	(Brazil) Danny Morais	(Romania) Nicolae Grigore	(Senegal) Papa Waigo	(Timor-Leste) **Murilo de Almeida**	(Jordan) Yaseen Al-Bakhit
Al-Faisaly	(Brazil) **Marcelo Nicácio**	(Brazil) **Reinaldo**	(Jordan) Khalil Bani Attiah	(Jordan) **Yaseen Al-Bakhit**	(Albania) Gilman Lika (Albania) Migen Memelli (Brazil) Leandro Oliveira
Al-Fateh	(Brazil) Élton Arábia	(Democratic Republic of the Congo) Doris Fuakumputu	(Tunisia) Ammar Jemal	(Lebanon) **Mohamad Haidar**	
Al-Hilal	(Brazil) **Digão**	(Brazil) Thiago Neves	(Ecuador) Segundo Castillo	(South Korea) **Kwak Tae-hwi**	(Morocco) Adil Hermach (South Korea) Cho Sung-hwan
Al-Ittihad	(Brazil) Jóbson	(Brazil) Leandro Bonfim	(Uruguay) **Juan Pablo Rodríguez**		(Brazil) Fernando Baiano (Lebanon) Mohamad Haidar
Al-Nahda	(Ghana) **Sadick Adams**	(Ivory Coast) **Habib Meïté**	(Tunisia) Amine Abbès		(Bahrain) Ismail Abdullatif (Brazil) Renan Silva (Mali) Adama Traoré
Al-Nassr	(Algeria) **Mourad Delhoum**	(Bahrain) Mohamed Husain	(Brazil) Élton Brandão	(Oman) **Amad Al-Hosni**	(Brazil) Everton (Brazil) Rafael Bastos
Al-Orobah	(Cameroon) Charles Edoa	(Cameroon) **Jean Bapidi**	(Egypt) Ibrahim Salah	(Jordan) Abdallah Deeb	(Mali) Eliassou Issiaka
Al-Raed	(Brazil) Bruno Moreno	(Cameroon) Alexis Enam	(Ivory Coast) Issoumaïla Dao	(Oman) Hussain Al-Hadhri	
Al-Shabab	(Brazil) Fernando Menegazzo	(Brazil) Rafinha	(Colombia) Macnelly Torres	(Sweden) **Imad Khalili** ^{1}	(South Korea) Kwak Tae-hwi
Al-Shoulla	(Mali) Lassana Fané	(Mali) Mamadou Kondo	(Morocco) Hassan Taïr	(Jordan) Mohammad Mustafa	
Al-Taawoun	(Brazil) Vinícius Reche	(Cameroon) Paul Alo'o	(Kenya) David Ochieng	(Jordan) Shadi Abu Hash'hash	
Najran	(Algeria) Farid Cheklam	(Brazil) **Gotler**	(Brazil) Jandson	(Jordan) Mussab Al-Laham	(Nigeria) Waheed Oseni

- **^1** Imad Khalili has Palestinian citizenship and was counted as an Asian player.

== League table ==
Pos	Team	Pld	W	D	L	GF	GA	GD	Pts	Qualification or relegation
1	Al-Nassr (C)	26	20	5	1	60	21	+39	65	Qualification for the AFC Champions League group stage
2	Al-Hilal	26	20	3	3	60	24	+36	63	Qualification for the AFC Champions League group stage
3	Al-Ahli	26	12	9	5	48	24	+24	45	Qualification for the AFC Champions League play-off round
4	Al-Shabab	26	9	10	7	42	38	+4	37	Qualification for the AFC Champions League group stage (Note: Al-Shabab qualified for the Champions League group stage as 2014 King Cup winners.)
5	Al-Taawoun	26	8	11	7	33	28	+5	35	Qualification for the GCC Champions League
6	Al-Faisaly	26	8	8	10	28	35	−7	32 (Note: Al-Faisaly finished ahead of Al-Ittihad on head-to-head points: Al-Faisaly 3–0 Al-Ittihad, Al-Ittihad 1–2 Al-Faisaly)	Qualification for the GCC Champions League
7	Al-Ittihad	26	8	8	10	45	46	−1	32	
8	Al-Orobah	26	5	14	7	24	33	−9	29 (Note: Al-Orobah finished ahead of Al-Raed on overall goal difference: Al-Orobah –9, Al-Raed –12 (Al-Raed 1–1 Al-Orobah, Al-Orobah 0–0 Al-Raed).)	
9	Al-Raed	26	7	8	11	21	33	−12	29	
10	Al-Fateh	26	7	7	12	33	39	−6	28 (Note: Al-Fateh finished ahead of Najran on head-to-head points: Al-Fateh 5–2 Najran, Najran 1–1 Al-Fateh)	
11	Najran	26	8	4	14	32	43	−11	28	
12	Al-Shoulla	26	6	8	12	30	42	−12	26 (Note: Al-Shoulla finished ahead of Al-Ettifaq on head-to-head goal difference: Al-Ettifaq 1–0 Al-Shoulla, Al-Shoulla 4–0 Al-Ettifaq)	
13	Al-Ettifaq (R)	26	6	8	12	30	41	−11	26	Relegation to the First Division
14	Al-Nahda (R)	26	3	7	16	29	68	−39	16	Relegation to the First Division

Updated to match(es) played on 6 April 2014. Source: SLstat
Rules for classification: 1) Points; 2) Head-to-head points; 3) Head-to-head goal difference; 4) Total goal difference; 5) Total goals scored; 6) Fair-play points (Note: Head-to-head record is used only after all the matches between the teams in question have been played).
(C) Champions; (R) Relegated

== Results ==
Home \ Away	AHL	ETT	FSY	FAT	HIL	ITT	NAH	NSR	ORO	RAE	SHB	SHO	TWN	NAJ
Al-Ahli		2–1	1–1	4–0	1–1	2–1	3–1	0–0	1–1	0–0	1–1	5–2	1–2	3–2
Al-Ettifaq	2–0		1–1	2–0	1–3	2–5	2–1	1–2	0–0	0–1	0–1	1–0	3–3	0–0
Al-Faisaly	1–3	0–3		2–1	1–3	3–0	2–1	0–2	1–1	3–2	0–0	2–0	0–0	1–0
Al-Fateh	0–3	2–0	1–0		0–1	1–1	4–0	1–2	0–0	2–2	2–1	3–1	1–1	5–2
Al-Hilal	1–0	5–1	2–1	2–0		5–2	6–0	1–2	3–0	1–2	4–1	2–0	1–0	2–0
Al-Ittihad	0–0	1–1	1–2	4–2	2–2		2–1	0–3	0–0	1–2	1–1	4–1	2–1	3–2
Al-Nahda	1–5	2–0	0–0	1–2	1–2	4–4		1–4	2–2	1–0	4–1	2–2	0–2	2–5
Al-Nassr	3–1	2–2	4–0	1–0	3–4	3–1	4–1		2–1	3–0	3–2	2–0	2–1	2–0
Al-Orobah	0–4	1–4	1–2	2–1	2–3	1–0	1–1	0–0		0–0	1–1	2–2	0–0	1–1
Al-Raed	0–1	2–1	1–0	2–1	0–1	1–4	0–0	0–3	1–1		0–0	0–1	0–0	1–0
Al-Shabab	1–0	0–0	4–3	1–1	1–0	1–4	6–0	1–1	1–3	5–2		1–3	1–0	5–1
Al-Shoulla	1–1	4–0	1–1	2–2	2–2	2–1	0–0	0–3	1–2	1–1	0–1		1–2	1–2
Al-Taawoun	1–1	2–2	1–1	1–0	1–2	1–1	4–1	1–1	0–1	2–1	3–3	0–1		2–0
Najran	0–5	1–0	1–0	1–1	0–1	2–0	5–1	2–3	2–0	1–0	1–1	0–1	1–2	

Updated to match(es) played on 6 April 2014. Source: SLstat.com
Legend: Blue = home team win; Yellow = draw; Red = away team win.

== Season statistics ==
=== Scoring ===
==== Top scorers ====
Rank	Player	Club	Goals
1	(Saudi Arabia) Nasser Al-Shamrani	Al-Hilal	21
2	(Saudi Arabia) Mukhtar Fallatah	Al-Ittihad	20
3	(Saudi Arabia) Mohammad Al-Sahlawi	Al-Nassr	17
4	(Brazil) Élton Brandão	Al-Nassr	16
5	(Brazil) Jandson	Najran	14
6	(Brazil) Thiago Neves	Al-Hilal	13
7	(Cameroon) Paul Alo'o	Al-Taawoun	12
8	(Democratic Republic of the Congo) Doris Fuakumputu	Al-Fateh	11
9	(Morocco) Hassan Taïr	Al-Shoulla	10
10	(Brazil) Élton Arábia	Al-Fateh	9
10	(Senegal) Papa Waigo	Al-Ettifaq	9

==== Hat-tricks ====
Player	For	Against	Result	Date	Ref
(Saudi Arabia) Mukhtar Fallatah^{4}	Al-Ittihad	Al-Shabab	4–1 (A)	26 August 2013	
(Saudi Arabia) Mukhtar Fallatah	Al-Ittihad	Al-Raed	4–1 (A)	25 November 2013	
(Brazil) Thiago Neves	Al-Hilal	Al-Ettifaq	5–1 (H)	28 December 2013	
(Brazil) Jandson	Najran	Al-Nahda	5–1 (H)	25 January 2014	
(Saudi Arabia) Mohammad Al-Sahlawi	Al-Nassr	Al-Faisaly	4–0 (H)	7 February 2014	
(São Tomé and Príncipe) Luís Leal	Al-Ahli	Al-Fateh	4–0 (H)	14 February 2014	
(Brazil) Élton Brandão	Al-Nassr	Al-Ittihad	3–1 (H)	23 March 2014	
(Saudi Arabia) Nasser Al-Shamrani^{4}	Al-Hilal	Al-Nahda	6–0 (H)	28 March 2014	

Notes

(H) – Home; (A) – Away
^{4} Player scored 4 goals

=== Clean sheets ===
Rank	Player	Club	Clean sheets
1	(Saudi Arabia) Abdullah Al-Enezi	Al-Nassr	10
2	(Saudi Arabia) Waleed Abdullah	Al-Shabab	9
3	(Saudi Arabia) Ahmed Al-Kassar	Al-Raed	8
4	(Saudi Arabia) Abdullah Al-Mayouf	Al-Ahli	7
5	(Saudi Arabia) Mansoor Al-Najai	Al-Faisaly	6
5	(Saudi Arabia) Rafea Al-Ruwaili	Al-Orobah	6
7	(Saudi Arabia) Fahad Al-Thunayan	Al-Taawoun	5
7	(Saudi Arabia) Mohammad Sharifi	Al-Ettifaq	5
7	(Saudi Arabia) Nasser Al-Saiari	Najran	5
7	(Saudi Arabia) Saeed Al-Harbi	Al-Shoulla	5

=== Discipline ===
==== Player ====
- Most yellow cards: 11
  - (Saudi Arabia) Omar Hawsawi (Al-Nassr)
- Most red cards: 2
  - (Brazil) Fernando Menegazzo (Al-Shabab)
  - (Ivory Coast) Issoumaila Dao (Al-Raed)

==== Club ====
- Most yellow cards: 58
  - Al-Nahda
- Most red cards: 6
  - Al-Ahli

== Attendances ==
=== By team ===
Pos	Team	Total	High	Low	Average	Change
1	Al-Nassr	217,286	48,730	3,758	16,714	+321.0%
2	Al-Hilal	164,015	40,193	2,589	12,617	+113.6%
3	Al-Ahli	103,472	31,211	0	7,959	+8.4%
4	Al-Ittihad	98,744	24,177	613	7,596	−14.8%
5	Al-Taawoun	77,040	52,551	365	5,926	+106.6%
6	Al-Shabab	46,646	15,348	285	3,588	+40.5%
7	Al-Ettifaq	37,922	14,132	149	2,917	+7.7%
8	Al-Orobah	36,437	4,200	1,124	2,803	n/a †
9	Al-Fateh	29,148	10,150	527	2,242	−63.5%
10	Al-Nahda	24,852	10,636	42	1,912	n/a †
11	Al-Raed	23,186	7,100	362	1,784	−51.2%
12	Al-Shoulla	12,855	4,248	107	989	+45.2%
13	Najran	12,685	3,543	242	976	−9.6%
14	Al-Faisaly	9,388	2,433	120	722	−32.3%
	League total	893,676	52,551	0	4,910	+38.5%

Updated to games played on 6 April 2014
Notes:
^{†} Teams played previous season in First Division.
