= 2013 Saudi Super Cup =

2013 Saudi Super Cup كأس السوبر السعودي 2013
- Event: Saudi Super Cup
Al-Fateh	Al-Ittihad
Pro League	King Cup
3	2
- After extra time
- Date: 17 August 2013
- Venue: King Abdulaziz Stadium, Mecca, Saudi Arabia
- Referee: Abdulrahman Al-Amri
- Attendance: 29,376
- Weather: Clear; 33 °C (91 °F); 44% humidity

The 2013 Saudi Super Cup was the inaugural edition of the Saudi Super Cup, an annual Saudi football match played between the winners of the previous season's Saudi Pro League and the King Cup of Champions.

The match was contested by Al-Fateh, winners of the 2012–13 Saudi Pro League, and Al-Ittihad, winners of the 2013 King Cup of Champions. It was held on 17 August 2013 at the King Abdulaziz Stadium in Mecca, Saudi Arabia.

Al-Fateh won the match 3–2 after extra time, becoming the inaugural champions of the Saudi Super Cup.

== Venue ==
The King Abdulaziz Stadium was announced as the host of the final venue on 12 July 2013. This was the second domestic final to be held in the stadium.

The King Abdulaziz Stadium was opened in 1986. The stadium was used as a venue for the 2005 Islamic Solidarity Games and hosted the final. It also hosted the 2011 Saudi Crown Prince Cup final. Its current capacity is 33,000 and it is used by Al-Wehda as a home stadium.

== Background ==
In 2012, the Saudi Arabian Football Federation officially decided to launch the Saudi Super Cup following the conclusion of the 2011–12 season. The planned inaugural match was scheduled to be held between the 2011–12 Saudi Pro League champions, Al-Shabab, and the 2012 King Cup of Champions winners, Al-Ahli. However, the 2012 Super Cup was canceled due to scheduling issues, as no appropriate date for the match could be found. As a result, the Saudi Arabian Football Federation postponed the tournament to 2013.

Al-Fateh qualified for the 2013 Saudi Super Cup by winning the 2012–13 Saudi Pro League, securing the title with two matches to spare after a 1–0 home win against Al-Ahli. Al-Ittihad qualified by winning their eighth King Cup title, defeating Al-Shabab 4–2 in the final.

This match marked the 11th meeting between Al-Fateh and Al-Ittihad in all competitions. Prior to this game, both teams had won four matches each, with two encounters ending in draws.

== Match ==
=== Details ===
17 August 2013
20:45 SAST

Al-Fateh	3–2 (a.e.t.)	Al-Ittihad
Fuakumputu 2', 73'; Élton 111'	Report	Fallatah 29' (pen.), 90+2' (pen.)

King Abdulaziz Stadium, Mecca
Attendance: 29,376
Referee: Abdulrahman Al-Amri

Al-Fateh	Al-Ittihad

GK	22	(Saudi Arabia) Abdullah Al-Owaishir
RB	24	(Saudi Arabia) Mohammad Nami
CB	14	(Saudi Arabia) Mohammed Al-Fuhaid	(yellow card) 58'
CB	4	(Saudi Arabia) Bader Al-Nakhli
LB	16	(Saudi Arabia) Mishaal Al-Saeed	(yellow card) 85'
DM	25	(Saudi Arabia) Abdullah Al-Dossari		(substituted off) 91'
RM	7	(Saudi Arabia) Hamdan Al-Hamdan
CM	8	(Saudi Arabia) Housain Al-Mogahwi		(substituted off) 66'
CM	88	(Saudi Arabia) Mubarak Al-Asmari		(substituted off) 112'
LM	77	(Brazil) Élton (c)
CF	9	(Democratic Republic of the Congo) Doris Salomo
Substitutes:
GK	1	(Saudi Arabia) Mohammed Al-Gomaish
DF	17	(Saudi Arabia) Abdullah Al-Abdullah
DF	32	(Saudi Arabia) Abdulaziz Oboshqra
MF	6	(Saudi Arabia) Ahmed Al-Sultan
MF	10	(Saudi Arabia) Rabee Sufyani		(substituted on) 66'
MF	20	(Saudi Arabia) Sultan Al-Shammeri		(substituted on) 112'
MF	66	(Saudi Arabia) Abdulrahman Al-Qahtani		(substituted on) 91'
Manager:
(Tunisia) Fathi Al-Jabal

GK	22	(Saudi Arabia) Fawaz Al-Qarni
RB	3	(Saudi Arabia) Mansor Sharahili
CB	6	(Saudi Arabia) Basem Al-Montashari
CB	13	(Saudi Arabia) Ahmed Assiri
LB	16	(Saudi Arabia) Mohammed Qassem	(red card) 93'
DM	4	(Saudi Arabia) Maan Khodari		(substituted off) 73'
DM	14	(Saudi Arabia) Saud Kariri (c)
RW	8	(Saudi Arabia) Fahad Al-Muwallad
AM	10	(Saudi Arabia) Ahmed Al-Fraidi		(substituted off) 80'
LW	23	(Saudi Arabia) Mohammed Abousaban		(substituted off) 86'
CF	44	(Saudi Arabia) Mukhtar Fallatah
Substitutes:
GK	1	(Saudi Arabia) Mabrouk Zaid
DF	17	(Saudi Arabia) Abdulmutalib Al-Traidi
DF	32	(Saudi Arabia) Mohammed Al-Amri
DF	39	(Saudi Arabia) Talal Al-Absi
MF	11	(Saudi Arabia) Hattan Bahebri	(yellow card) 96'	(substituted on) 80'
MF	45	(Saudi Arabia) Abdulfattah Asiri		(substituted on) 86'
FW	49	(Saudi Arabia) Abdulrahman Al-Ghamdi	(yellow card) 119'	(substituted on) 73'
Manager:
(Spain) Beñat San José

Assistant referees:
Abdulraheem Al-Shammari
Mohammed Al-Abkari
Fourth official:
Turki Al-Khudhayr

Match rules

- 90 minutes.
- 30 minutes of extra time if necessary.
- Penalty shoot-out if scores still level.
- Seven named substitutes.
- Maximum of three substitutions.

=== Statistics ===
Overall
	Al-Fateh	Al-Ittihad
Goals scored	3	2
Total shots	15	12
Shots on target	7	7
Ball possession	50%	50%
Corner kicks	5	3
Fouls committed	20	22
Offsides	2	2
Yellow cards	2	2
Red cards	0	1

== See also ==
- 2012–13 Saudi Pro League
- 2013 King Cup of Champions
