= Fahad Al-Muwallad =

Saudi Arabian footballer (born 1994)

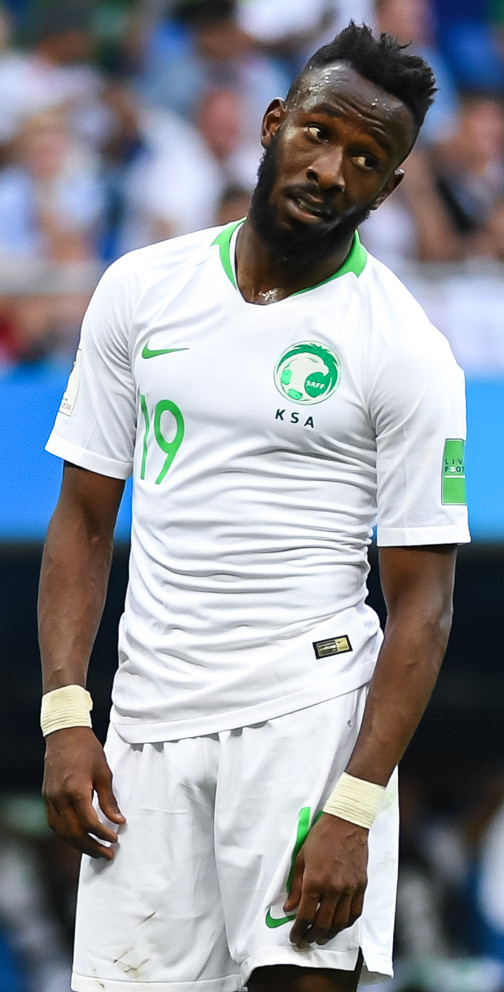
- Fahad with Saudi Arabia during the 2018 FIFA World Cup

Personal information
- Full name: Fahad Mosa'ed Al-Muwallad
- Date of birth: 14 September 1994 (age 32)
- Place of birth: Jeddah, Saudi Arabia
- Height: 1.71 m (5 ft 7 in)
- Position: Winger

Youth career
- 2000–2011: Al-Ittihad

Senior career*
Years	Team	Apps	(Gls)
2011–2022	Al-Ittihad	193	(58)
2018	→ Levante (loan)	2	(0)
2022–2025	Al-Shabab	32	(2)

International career^{‡}
2011–2015	Saudi Arabia U20	6	(4)
2015	Saudi Arabia U23	3	(1)
2012–2024	Saudi Arabia	80	(17)
- * Club domestic league appearances and goals as of 29 August 2024 ‡ National team caps and goals as of 22:28, 11 September 2026 (UTC)

Fahad Mosa'ed Al-Muwallad (Arabic: فهد مساعد المولد, born 14 September 1994) is a Saudi Arabian professional footballer who currently plays as a winger.

He started his professional career with Al-Ittihad at the age of 16. On 31 July 2011 he scored the second goal for Saudi Arabia against Croatia in the 2011 U-20 World Cup in Colombia, which marked his first ever international goal at age 16. In 2012 while playing for Al-Ittihad, he entered the match as a substitute in the last 10 minutes and scored the winning goal against Guangzhou Evergrande F.C. to help his team qualify for AFC Champions League semi-finals. With Saudi Arabia, he scored the winning goal against China in Asian Cup qualifications. Additionally and most notably being the fastest Asian players nowadays.

== Early life and breakthrough ==
Fahad Al-Muwallad was born in Jeddah and from a very early age he became well known as a prominent footballing talent in the local area. He was then approached by a Barcelona scout after seeing him put in a good amount of great performances. He rejected the offer then went on to join the Al-Ittihad youth team from the age of 6, he worked his way up the ranks and started to gain national media attention when he started training with the first-team squad at the age of just 15 years.

On 7 February 2012, at just 16-years-old, Fahad al-Muwallad made his professional debut against Al-Raed. After playing more matches regularly in the Saudi Professional League, Fahad became renowned for his blistering pace and his superb technical ability while showing brilliant composure in front of goal.

== Club career ==
=== Al-Ittihad ===
==== 2012–13 season ====
Fahad continued to impress and on 2 August 2012, Fahad scored his first professional goal against Al-Raed in a 2–2 draw. During the 2012/13 season, Fahad started to become known as one of biggest talents in Asian football, after scoring many goals for Al-Ittihad from the wing. Fahad then grew further international attention when, at the age of just 17 years, he scored the decisive goal in the quarter-final of the prestigious AFC Champions League against Marcelo Lippi's Guangzhou Evergrande that sent Al-Ittihad into the semi-finals.

Fahad also lit up the Champions Cup where he, first, scored in Al-Ittihad's semi-final victory over Al-Fateh and then he scored in the final in a 4–2 victory over Al-Shabab played in front of over 50,000 at the King Fahd International Stadium. Fahad was later voted the Champions Cup MVP (Most Valuable Player) due to his performances throughout the tournament. Fahad finished the 2012/13 season with an impressive 10 goals in 26 games in all competitions.

==== 2013–14 season ====
Fahad opened his account for the new season in the Saudi El Clasico in dramatic fashion, putting Al-Ittihad ahead after a clever through ball from Saud Kariri. Al-Ittihad lost the match 5–2 at the King Fahd International Stadium, but Fahad's performance was praised by Al-Ittihad manager Beñat San José and pundits alike. Fahad then scored in a vital match against Al-Ettifaq, opening proceedings with a powerful drive into the top left-hand corner of the net, leaving Al-Ettifaq goalkeeper Mohammad Sharifi motionless. However the game ended in disappointment for Al-Ittihad as Hasan Kadesh equalised for Al-Ettifaq, and the game finished as a 1–1 draw. Fahad also heavily impressed in the AFC Champions League against some of the best teams throughout the whole of Asia.

On 13 May 2014, Fahad scored 2 wonderful goals in a crucial last 16 tie against fellow Saudi outfit Al-Shabab] at the King Fahd International Stadium. After a clever reverse pass from Mukhtar Fallatah, Fahad ran onto the pass with excessive pace, beat the keeper to the ball and then poked the ball past him to send the crowd into raptures. Fahad then claimed his second goal of the match scoring an exquisite chip over Al-Shabab goalkeeper Waleed Abdullah. Al-Ittihad went on to win 3–1. Fahad ended the season with 5 goals in 36 appearances in all competitions. Fahad was praised by Al-Ittihad manager Khalid Al Koroni for improving his game this season by gaining more assists and described Fahad as an "extraordinary talent".

==== 2014–15 season ====
Fahad scored his first goal of the new campaign in a 2–1 victory over Al-Faisaly played at the King Abdul Aziz Stadium because construction work was still being done on Al-Ittihad's new stadium King Abdullah Sports City Stadium which is set to hold a capacity of over 60,000. On 17 October 2014, Fahad scored the winning goal in a 2–1 win over Al-Khaleej firing the ball past the near post of goalkeeper Moslem Freej. This was Fahad's first goal at the newly completed King Abdullah Sports City Stadium.

On 21 March 2015, Fahad scored against Al-Khaleej with a perfectly timed header to beat goalkeeper Moslem Freej. On 9 April 2015, Fahad scored a penalty which turned out to be the decisive goal in a 1–0 triumph over Hajer, Fahad expertly fired his penalty in the top left-hand corner of the net past the out-stretched hand of former Al-Ittihad goalkeeper Mustafa Malayekah.

On 22 April 2015, in the last 16 of the Champions Cup, Fahad came off the bench to fire two late goals past Al-Fateh in a 4–1 victory played at the Prince Abdullah bin Jalawi Stadium. Al-Ittihad manager Victor Pițurcă described Fahad's late goals as "heroic" and said "Fahad is making improvements everyday, if he keeps on playing as he is, he will go far, he has the world at his feet". On 27 April 2015, Fahad scored a magical goal in Al-Ittihad's 4–3 victory over Al-Taawon. In the 25th minute of the game, Jamal Bajandouh squared the ball to Fahad at the edge of the area, Fahad then touched it up and hit a ferocious bicycle kick that flew past Al-Taawon goalkeeper Sultan Al-Ghamdi into the back of the net. Fahad also scored a penalty in the same game where he expertly sent Sultan Al-Ghamdi in the wrong direction while placing the ball in the other side of the net.

On 15 May 2015, Fahad scored another wonderful goal in the "Derby of Jeddah" scoring the opening goal in the 84th minute after cutting inside and striking a thunderous shot into the top right-hand corner of the net past the helpless Abdullah Al-Maiouf in the Al-Ahli net. However, Salman Al-Moasher struck a late equalizer in the 89th minute to tie up proceedings, the match finished 1–1. On 31 May 2015, Fahad scored in the Saudi El Clasico, in the semi-finals of the Champions Cup at the King Fahd International Stadium, firing in a goal from the penalty spot, cancelling out the opening goal from Al-Hilal defender Digão. However the match ended in disappointment for Al-Ittihad as they capitulated with the match ending in a 4–1 win victory to Al-Hilal. Fahad ended the 2014/15 season with 10 goals in 24 appearances, while gaining praise from pundits for some extraordinary performances in Saudi Professional League and the Champions Cup.

==== 2015–2022: Crown Prince Cup title and loan to Levante ====
Al-Muwallad won the 2016–17 Saudi Crown Prince Cup with Al-Ittihad, contributing 14 goals across all competitions that season. He then went on loan to La Liga club Levante in 2018, where he made two appearances, becoming on 7 May 2018 the first Saudi to play in La Liga in a 3-0 win against Leganés. Upon his return in the 2018–19 season, he set a personal record by scoring 16 goals in all competitions.

=== Al-Shabab ===
In August 2022, Al-Muwallad joined fellow Saudi side Al-Shabab.

== International career ==
In May 2018, he was named in Saudi Arabia's preliminary squad for the 2018 World Cup in Russia. However, his performance in the World Cup was considered to be a deep disappointment, due to his incapability and his silence in important moments. Saudi Arabia eventually crashed out in the group stage, having lost 0–5 to Russia and 0–1 to Uruguay.

In 2022, he was removed from the Saudi squad for the 2022 FIFA World Cup on doping allegations.

== Personal life ==
On 12 September 2024, Al-Muwallad was admitted to intensive care after a fall from the balcony of his second-floor apartment in Dubai.

== Career statistics ==
=== Club ===
As of match played 27 May 2024

Club	Season	League			King Cup		Saudi Crown Prince Cup		Continental		Other		Total	
Club	Season	Division	Apps	Goals	Apps	Goals	Apps	Goals	Apps	Goals	Apps	Goals	Apps	Goals
Al-Ittihad	2011–12	SPL	2	0	0	0	0	0	4 (Note: Appearances in AFC Champions League)	1	—		6	1
Al-Ittihad	2012–13	SPL	21	7	5	2	1	0	—		—		27	9
Al-Ittihad	2013–14	SPL	25	5	5	3	2	2	7	2	1 (Note: Appearance in Saudi Super Cup)	0	40	12
Al-Ittihad	2014–15	SPL	21	7	3	3	1	0	—		—		25	10
Al-Ittihad	2015–16	SPL	22	3	2	0	3	0	5	1	—		32	4
Al-Ittihad	2016–17	SPL	20	11	0	0	4	3	—		—		24	14
Al-Ittihad	2017–18	SPL	9	3	2	1	—		—		—		11	4
Al-Ittihad	2018–19	SPL	21	11	3	1	—		5	4	1	0	30	16
Al-Ittihad	2019–20	SPL	8	4	0	0	—		—		0	0	8	4
Al-Ittihad	2020–21	SPL	23	4	1	0	—		—		1 (Note: Appearance in Arab Club Champions Cup)	0	25	4
Al-Ittihad	2021–22	SPL	21	3	2	0	—		—		1	0	24	3
Al-Ittihad	Total		193	58	23	10	11	5	21	8	4	0	252	81
Levante (loan)	2017–18	La Liga	2	0	—		—		—		—		2	0
Al Shabab	2022–23	SPL	11	0	1	0	—		2	0	—		14	0
Al Shabab	2023–24	SPL	19	2	3	0	—		—		0	0	22	2
Al Shabab	Total		30	2	4	0	—		2	0	0	0	36	2
Career total			225	60	27	10	11	5	23	8	4	0	290	83

=== International ===
Statistics accurate as of match played 10 September 2024.

National team	Year	Apps	Goals
Saudi Arabia
Saudi Arabia	2012	2	0
Saudi Arabia	2013	11	2
Saudi Arabia	2014	11	3
Saudi Arabia	2015	6	2
Saudi Arabia	2016	8	1
Saudi Arabia	2017	3	1
Saudi Arabia	2018	13	2
Saudi Arabia	2019	4	2
Saudi Arabia	2021	11	4
Saudi Arabia	2022	7	0
Saudi Arabia	2023	2	0
Saudi Arabia	2024	2	0
Saudi Arabia	Total	80	17

International goals

Scores and results list Saudi Arabia's goal tally first.

No.	Date	Venue	Opponent	Score	Result	Competition
1.	9 January 2013	Khalifa Sports City Stadium, Isa Town, Bahrain	Yemen	2–0	2–0	21st Arabian Gulf Cup
2.	6 February 2013	Prince Mohamed bin Fahd Stadium, Dammam, Saudi Arabia	China	1–0	2–1	2015 AFC Asian Cup qualification
3.	4 March 2014	Prince Mohamed bin Fahd Stadium, Dammam, Saudi Arabia	Indonesia	1–0	1–0	2015 AFC Asian Cup qualification
4.	6 November 2014	Prince Mohamed bin Fahd Stadium, Dammam, Saudi Arabia	Palestine	2–0	2–0	Friendly
5.	14 November 2014	King Fahd International Stadium, Riyadh, Saudi Arabia	Qatar	1–0	1–1	22nd Arabian Gulf Cup
6.	3 September 2015	King Abdullah Sports City, Jeddah, Saudi Arabia	Timor-Leste	7–0	7–0	2018 FIFA World Cup qualification
7.	17 November 2015	National Stadium, Dili, East Timor	Timor-Leste	10–0	10–0	2018 FIFA World Cup qualification
8.	11 October 2016	King Abdullah Sports City, Jeddah, Saudi Arabia	United Arab Emirates	1–0	3–0	2018 FIFA World Cup qualification
9.	5 September 2017	King Abdullah Sports City, Jeddah, Saudi Arabia	Japan	1–0	1–0	2018 FIFA World Cup qualification
10.	23 March 2018	Estadio Municipal, Marbella, Spain	Ukraine	1–1	1–1	Friendly
11.	20 November 2018	King Abdullah, Amman, Jordan	Jordan	1–0	1–1	Friendly
12.	8 January 2019	Rashid Stadium, Dubai, United Arab Emirates	North Korea	4–0	4–0	2019 AFC Asian Cup
13.	12 January 2019	Al-Maktoum Stadium, Dubai, United Arab Emirates	Lebanon	1–0	2–0	2019 AFC Asian Cup
14.	30 March 2021	King Saud University Stadium, Riyadh, Saudi Arabia	Palestine	2–0	5–0	2022 FIFA World Cup qualification
15.	5 June 2021	King Saud University Stadium, Riyadh, Saudi Arabia	Yemen	2–0	3–0	2022 FIFA World Cup qualification
16.	5 June 2021	King Saud University Stadium, Riyadh, Saudi Arabia	Yemen	3–0	3–0	2022 FIFA World Cup qualification
17.	11 June 2021	King Saud University Stadium, Riyadh, Saudi Arabia	Singapore	2–0	3–0	2022 FIFA World Cup qualification

== Honours ==
Al Ittihad

- King Cup: 2013
- Crown Prince Cup: 2016–17
- Saudi Super Cup runner-up: 2013, 2018

Individual

- King Cup Most Valuable Player: 2013
