= Bader Al-Nakhli =

Saudi Arabian footballer

Personal information
- Full name: Bader Jameel Al-Nakhli
- Date of birth: 20 May 1988 (age 38)
- Place of birth: Saudi Arabia
- Height: 1.79 m (5 ft 10 in)
- Position: Defender

Youth career
- Al-Qadisiyah
- Al-Nassr

Senior career*
Years	Team	Apps	(Gls)
2008–2010	Al-Nassr	0	(0)
2009–2010	→ Al-Fateh (loan)	6	(0)
2010–2016	Al-Fateh	131	(5)
2016–2018	Al-Ittihad	36	(0)
2019	Al-Batin	0	(0)
2019–2021	Al-Adalah	23	(0)
2021–2022	Al-Khaleej	4	(0)
2022–2023	Al-Rawdhah		
2024–2025	Al-Thoqbah		

International career^{‡}
2012–	Saudi Arabia	2	(0)
- * Club domestic league appearances and goals as of 19:03, 31 May 2021 (UTC) ‡ National team caps and goals as of 23 March 2017

Bader Al-Nakhli (Arabic: بدر جميل النخلي; born 20 May 1988) is a Saudi Arabian football (soccer) player who plays as a defender.

== Career statistics ==
As of match played on 6 April 2018

Appearances and goals by club, season and competition
Club	Season	League			Cup		League Cup		Other		Total	
Club	Season	Division	Apps	Goals	Apps	Goals	Apps	Goals	Apps	Goals	Apps	Goals
Al-Fateh	2010–11	Saudi Professional League	22	1	0	0	1	0	—		23	1
Al-Fateh	2011–12	Saudi Professional League	25	0	2	0	1	0	—		28	0
Al-Fateh	2012–13	Saudi Professional League	23	1	5	0	2	0	—		30	1
Al-Fateh	2013–14	Saudi Professional League	24	1	1	0	3	0	4	0	32	1
Al-Fateh	2014–15	Saudi Professional League	22	0	1	0	—				23	0
Al-Fateh	2015–16	Saudi Professional League	15	2	0	0	—				15	2
Al-Fateh	Total		131	5	9	0	7	0	4	0	151	5
Al-Ittihad	2016–17	Saudi Professional League	21	0	0	0	3	0	—		24	0
Al-Ittihad	2017–18	Saudi Professional League	15	0	1	1	—				16	1
Al-Ittihad	Total		36	0	1	1	3	0	0	0	40	1
Career totals			167	5	10	1	10	0	4	0	191	6

== Honours ==
Al Fateh

- Saudi Premier League: 2012-13
- Saudi Super Cup: 2013

Al-Ittihad

- Saudi Crown Prince Cup: 2016–17
- King Cup: 2018

Al-Khaleej

- First Division: 2021–22
