= Abdullah Al-Owaishir =

Saudi Arabian footballer

Personal information
- Full name: Abdullah Hussain Al-Owaishir
- Date of birth: May 13, 1991 (age 35)
- Place of birth: Al-Hasa, Saudi Arabia
- Height: 1.84 m (6 ft 0 in)
- Position: Goalkeeper

Team information
- Current team: Al-Wehda
- Number: 1

Youth career
- Al-Fateh

Senior career*
Years	Team	Apps	(Gls)
2009–2018	Al-Fateh	95	(0)
2018–2020	Al-Nassr	1	(0)
2019	→ Ohod (loan)	6	(0)
2019–2020	→ Al-Shabab (loan)	1	(0)
2020–2021	Al-Wehda	27	(0)
2021–2025	Al-Ettifaq	3	(0)
2024–2025	→ Al-Wehda (loan)	27	(0)
2025–	Al-Wehda	0	(0)
- * Club domestic league appearances and goals as of 21:56 28 October 2023 (UTC)

Abdullah Al-Owaishir (Arabic: عبدالله العويشير; born May 13, 1991) is a Saudi football player who plays as a goalkeeper for Al-Wehda.

== Career statistics ==
=== Club ===
As of match played 30 May 2021

Club	Season	League		King Cup		Crown Prince Cup		Asia		Other		Total	
Club	Season	Apps	Goals	Apps	Goals	Apps	Goals	Apps	Goals	Apps	Goals	Apps	Goals
Al-Fateh	2009–10	0	0	0	0	0	0	—		—		0	0
Al-Fateh	2010–11	1	0	—		0	0	—		—		1	0
Al-Fateh	2011–12	2	0	1	0	1	0	—		—		4	0
Al-Fateh	2012–13	19	0	5	0	2	0	—		3 (Note: Appearances in GCC Champions League)	0	29	0
Al-Fateh	2013–14	15	0	1	0	0	0	0	0	1 (Note: Appearances in Saudi Super Cup)	0	17	0
Al-Fateh	2014–15	15	0	0	0	1	0	—		—		16	0
Al-Fateh	2015–16	19	0	1	0	1	0	—		—		21	0
Al-Fateh	2016–17	21	0	0	0	2	0	3	0	—		26	0
Al-Fateh	2017–18	3	0	2	0	0	0	—		—		5	0
Al-Fateh	Total	95	0	10	0	7	0	3	0	4	0	119	0
Al-Nassr	2018–19	1	0	1	0	—		0	0	0	0	2	0
Ohod (loan)	2018–19	6	0	0	0	—		—		—		6	0
Al-Shabab (loan)	2019–20	1	0	1	0	—		—		6 (Note: Appearances in Arab Club Champions Cup)	0	8	0
Al-Wehda	2020–21	27	0	1	0	—		1	0	—		29	0
Career totals		130	0	13	0	7	0	4	0	10	0	164	0

== Honours ==
=== Club ===
Al-Fateh

- Saudi Professional League: 2012–13
- Saudi Super Cup: 2013

Al-Nassr

- Saudi Professional League: 2018–19
