= Fayez Al-Olayani =

Saudi Arabian footballer

Personal information
- Full name: Fayez Ahmed Saleh Al-Olayani
- Date of birth: August 25, 1984 (age 42)
- Place of birth: Saudi Arabia
- Height: 1.77 m (5 ft 10 in)
- Position: Midfielder

Youth career
- Abha

Senior career*
Years	Team	Apps	(Gls)
2005–2011	Abha		
2011–2015	Al-Fateh	34	(0)
2015–2018	Damac		
2018–2019	Jerash		
- * Club domestic league appearances and goals

Fayez Al-Olayani (born 25 August 1984) is a Saudi football player. He currently plays as a midfielder.

== Honours ==
Al-Fateh SC

- Saudi Professional League: 2012–13
- Saudi Super Cup: 2013
