= Élton Arábia =

Brazilian footballer (born 1986)

Personal information
- Full name: Élton José Xavier Gomes
- Date of birth: 7 April 1986 (age 40)
- Place of birth: Palmeira dos Índios, Alagoas, Brazil
- Height: 1.54 m (5 ft 1 in)
- Position: Attacking midfielder

Youth career
- Corinthians

Senior career*
Years	Team	Apps	(Gls)
2004–2007	Corinthians	5	(0)
2006	→ São Caetano (loan)	30	(2)
2007	FC Steaua București	8	(1)
2007–2009	Al-Nassr	36	(6)
2009	→ Al-Rayyan (loan)		
2009	Fortaleza	14	(1)
2009–2010	Dubai Club		(0)
2010	→ Al-Wasl (loan)	7	(1)
2010–2011	Sport Recife	23	(1)
2011–2016	Al-Fateh	121	(48)
2016	Mesaimeer	5	(7)
2017–2019	Al-Qadsiah	60	(13)
2019–2020	CRB	15	(1)
2020	Al-Wehda	12	(0)
2020–2021	Al-Hamriyah	1	(0)
Total		337	(81)
- * Club domestic league appearances and goals

Élton José Xavier Gomes (born 7 April 1986), known as Élton Arábia or just Élton, is a Brazilian former professional footballer who played as an attacking midfielder.

== Career ==
=== Steaua București ===
Élton Arábia was bought by Romanian side Steaua București at the age of 21. Even though his spell with the Romanian team was short, his impact was immediate. He scored in his first match against FC Argeş Piteşti and had great performances in the next games. In a 2009 poll, he was chosen by the Steaua Bucharest fans in the team's Best XI for the past ten years. Steaua Bucharest's Executive President Mihai Stoica has always expressed his amazement for the incredible technique and dribbling tricks Arábia is capable of.

=== Al Nassr ===
In 2007, he moved to Saudi side Al Nassr where he scored frequently and provided many assists. He was loved and cherished by the Al Nasr fans who found him unique due to his quick pace and dribbling. The most distinctive thing about the player, which all fans copied by wearing wigs, was his long afro hair.

=== Return to Brazil ===
In 2009, Arábia moved to Fortaleza Esporte Clube back in Brazil.

=== Emirati club ===
At the end of 2009, Arábia moved to Dubai Club where he contributed to the team's winning of the Federation Cup. In February 2010, he was loaned to the UAE Giants Al Wasl for the rest of the 2009–10 season.

=== Return to Saudia ===
In the 2012–13 season he played for Al Fateh in 25 league games and scored 11 goals, helping the team win the first title in the history of the club. He then played in the Saudi Super Cup against Al-Ittihad Jeddah, after 90 minutes the score was 2-2 and the game went into extra time. Arábia scored the winning goal of the game in the 111th minute, the final result was 3-2 for Al Fateh.

In 2017, Arábia moved to Saudi side Al-Qadisiyah, where he captains the team. However, during the winter transfer window, He moved to the western province and joined Al-Wehda Club.

== Career statistics ==
Appearances and goals by club, season and competition
Club	Season	League			National cup (Note: Includes Kings Cup)		League cup (Note: Includes Saudi Crown Prince Cup)		Other		Continental		Total	
Club	Season	Division	Apps	Goals	Apps	Goals	Apps	Goals	Apps	Goals	Apps	Goals	Apps	Goals
Corinthians	2004	Série A	3	0	1	0	—		0 (Note: Appearances in Campeonato Paulista)	0	—		15	0
Corinthians	2005	Série A	2	0	1	0	—		4	0	—		11	1
Corinthians	2006	Série A	0	0	0	0	—		16	2	—		32	0
Corinthians	2007	Série A	0	0	0	0	—		7	0	—		32	0
Corinthians	total		5	0	2	0	0	0	26	2	0	0	37	2
São Caetano	2006	Série A	30	2	0	0	—		—		—		30	2
Steaua	2006–07	Liga I	8	1	0	0	0	0	0	0	0	0	8	1
Al Nassr	2007–08	Saudi Professional League	20	3	2	0	1	0	—			3 (Note: Goals in Prince Faisal bin Fahd League U-21)		6
Al Nassr	2008–09	Saudi Professional League	16	3		0		1		1 (Note: Goals in GCC Champions League)		4		9
Al Nassr	total		36	6		0		1	0	1		7		15
Al-Rayyan	2008–09	Qatar Stars League	0	0	3	0	—		—		—		3	0
Fortaleza	2009	Série B	14	1	0	0			—		—		14	1
Dubai CSC	2009–10	UAE First Division League		0	0	0	0	0	—		—			
Al-Wasl	2009–10	UAE Pro League	7	1	0	0	2	1	1	1 (Note: Goals in GCC Champions League)	—		10	3
Sport Recife	2010	Série B	23	1	0	0			5 (Note: Appearances in Campeonato Pernambucano)	0	—		28	1
Al Fateh	2010–11	Saudi Professional League	9	3	0	0	0	0	0	0	—		9	3
Al Fateh	2011–12	Saudi Professional League	13	3	5	5	2	0	0	0	—		20	8
Al Fateh	2012–13	Saudi Professional League	25	11	5	0	2	0	2 (Note: Appearances in Arab Club Champions Cup)	3	—		34	14
Al Fateh	2013–14	Saudi Professional League	24	9	1	0	3	1	1 (Note: Appearance in 2013 Saudi Super Cup)	1	6 (Note: Appearances in AFC Champions League)	0	35	11
Al Fateh	2014–15	Saudi Professional League	25	10	1	0	0	0	0	0	—		25	10
Al Fateh	2015–16	Saudi Professional League	25	12	0	0	1	0	—		—		26	12
Al Fateh	total		121	48	12	5	6	1	3	4	6	0	148	58
Mesaimeer	2016–17	Qatari Second Division	5	7	0	0	—		—		—		5	7
Al Qadsiah	2016–17	Saudi Professional League	10	3	1	0	—		—		—		11	3
Al Qadsiah	2017–18	Saudi Professional League	21	3	3	2	—		—		—		24	5
Al Qadsiah	2018–19	Saudi Professional League	29	7	1	0	—		—		—		30	7
Al Qadsiah	total		60	13	4	2	0	0	0	0	0	0	64	15
CRB	2019	Série B	15	1	0	0			—		—		15	1
Al Wehda	2019–20	Saudi Professional League	12	0	1	0	—		—		—		13	0
Al Hamriyah	2020–21	UAE First Division League	1	0	4	1	—		—		—		5	1
Career total			326	93	23	6	29	8	53	6	42	13	473	126

== Honours ==
Corinthians

- Campeonato Brasileiro Série A: 2005

Dubai Club

- UAE Federation Cup: 2010

Al-Fateh

- Saudi Pro League: 2012–13
- Saudi Super Cup: 2013

Al-Nassr

- Saudi Federation Cup: 2007-08
