= Abdullah Al-Abdullah =

Saudi Arabian footballer

Personal information
- Full name: Abdullah Ali Al-Abdullah
- Date of birth: January 31, 1985 (age 41)
- Place of birth: Saudi Arabia
- Height: 1.78 m (5 ft 10 in)
- Position: Defender

Team information
- Current team: Al-Shurooq
- Number: 17

Youth career
- Al-Fateh

Senior career*
Years	Team	Apps	(Gls)
2007–2015	Al-Fateh		
2015–2021	Al Jeel		
2021–2022	Al-Rawdhah		
2022–2024	Al-Omran		
2024–	Al-Shurooq		
- * Club domestic league appearances and goals

Abdullah Al-Abdullah (Arabic: عبد الله العبد الله; born 31 January 1985) is a Saudi football (soccer) player who currently plays for Al-Shurooq as a defender.

== Honours ==
Al-Fateh SC

- Saudi Professional League: 2012–13
- Saudi Super Cup: 2013
