= Mukhtar Fallatah =

Saudi footballer (born 1987)

Personal information
- Full name: Mukhtar Omar Othman Fallatah
- Date of birth: 15 October 1987 (age 39)
- Place of birth: Mecca, Saudi Arabia
- Height: 1.78 m (5 ft 10 in)
- Position: Striker

Youth career
- –2009: Al-Wehda

Senior career*
| Years | Team | Apps | (Gls) |
| 2008–2011 | Al-Wehda | 50 | (10) |
| 2011–2012 | Al Shabab | 30 | (6) |
| 2012–2016 | Al-Ittihad | 69 | (33) |
| 2016–2017 | Al-Wehda | 23 | (16) |
| 2017–2019 | Al-Hilal | 7 | (2) |
| 2019 | Al-Qadsiah | 7 | (0) |
| 2020 | Al-Shoulla | 1 | (0) |
| 2020–2021 | Jeddah | 13 | (3) |
| 2021 | Al-Tai | 11 | (0) |
| 2021–2022 | Al-Jubail | 10 | (4) |
| 2022–2023 | Al-Hedaya | | |
| 2023–2024 | Al-Wadi | | |

International career^{‡}
| 2009–2018 | Saudi Arabia | 12 | (2) |
- * Club domestic league appearances and goals as of 00:08, 6 November 2021 (UTC) ‡ National team caps and goals as of 18:15, 5 January 2018 (UTC)

Mukhtar Omar Othman Fallatah (Arabic: مُخْتَار عُمَر عُثْمَان فَلَاتَة, born 15 October 1987) is a Saudi Arabian footballer who plays as a striker former the Saudi Arabia national team.

== Club career ==
=== Al-Wehda ===
Mukhtar Fallatah started his professional career at Al-Wehda. He made 61 appearances and scored 17 goals during his three seasons with the first team. He helped the club reach the final of the 2010–11 Crown Prince Cup.

=== Al-Shabab ===
Following Al-Wehda's relegation, Fallatah joined Al-Shabab for a reported fee of SAR5.5 million. In his first season at the club, Fallatah helped Al-Shabab win the league title as he made 20 league appearances and scored four times. In his second season, Fallatah failed to nail down a spot in the starting 11 and left the club mid-season.

=== Al-Ittihad ===
On 14 January 2013, Fallatah joined Al-Ittihad on a three-and-a-half-year contract. In his first season, Fallatah played a crucial role as Al-Ittihad won the King Cup. He scored four times including once in the final against former club Al-Shabab. His good form continued to the next season as Fallatah scored 32 goals in all competitions. His good form earned him a call-up to the national team for the first time since 2012. Fallatah left Al-Ittihad following the expiry of his contract.

=== Return to Al-Wehda ===
On 14 July 2016, Fallatah returned to Al-Wehda on a free transfer. He signed a three-year contract with the club. He scored 16 goals in 23 appearances in the league; however, his efforts were not enough to prevent Al-Wehda's relegation to the First Division.

=== Al-Hilal ===
On 4 June 2017, Fallatah joined Al-Hilal on a free transfer. He scored his first goal for Al-Hilal in the 1–1 draw against former club Al-Ittihad. Fallatah made seven appearances and scored twice as Al-Hilal won the league title. In his second season, Fallatah made just one appearance for the club. He was released from his contract on 17 January 2019.

=== Al-Qadsiah ===
On 19 January 2019, Fallatah joined Al-Qadsiah on a six-month contract. He made seven appearances and failed to score as Al-Qadsiah were relegated at the end of the season.

=== Al-Shoulla ===
After nine months without a club, Fallatah joined MS League side Al-Shoulla on 31 January 2020. He signed a 6-month contract with the club.

== Career statistics ==
=== Club ===
As of 31 May 2021

| Club | Season | League | | | King Cup | | Crown Prince Cup (Note: Discontinued in September 19, 2017) | | Asia | | Other | | Total | |
| Club | Season | Division | Apps | Goals | Apps | Goals | Apps | Goals | Apps | Goals | Apps | Goals | Apps | Goals |
|---|---|---|---|---|---|---|---|---|---|---|---|---|---|---|
| Al-Wehda | 2008–09 | Pro League | 12 | 0 | 1 | 0 | 0 | 0 | — | | — | | 13 | 0 |
| Al-Wehda | 2009–10 | Pro League | 18 | 4 | 1 | 0 | 1 | 0 | — | | — | | 20 | 4 |
| Al-Wehda | 2010–11 | Pro League | 20 | 6 | 4 | 6 | 4 | 1 | — | | — | | 28 | 13 |
| Al-Wehda | Al-Wehda Total | | 50 | 10 | 6 | 6 | 5 | 1 | 0 | 0 | 0 | 0 | 61 | 17 |
| Al-Shabab | 2011–12 | Pro League | 20 | 4 | 2 | 0 | 1 | 1 | — | | — | | 23 | 5 |
| Al-Shabab | 2012–13 | Pro League | 10 | 2 | 0 | 0 | 1 | 0 | 0 | 0 | — | | 11 | 2 |
| Al-Shabab | Al-Shabab Total | | 30 | 6 | 2 | 0 | 2 | 1 | 0 | 0 | 0 | 0 | 34 | 7 |
| Al-Ittihad | 2012–13 | Pro League | 4 | 1 | 4 | 4 | 0 | 0 | — | | — | | 8 | 5 |
| Al-Ittihad | 2013–14 | Pro League | 25 | 20 | 4 | 3 | 1 | 1 | 9 | 6 | 1 (Note: Appearances in Super Cup) | 2 | 40 | 32 |
| Al-Ittihad | 2014–15 | Pro League | 23 | 7 | 2 | 2 | 1 | 0 | — | | — | | 26 | 9 |
| Al-Ittihad | 2015–16 | Pro League | 17 | 5 | 3 | 2 | 4 | 1 | 5 | 1 | — | | 29 | 9 |
| Al-Ittihad | Al-Ittihad Total | | 69 | 33 | 13 | 11 | 6 | 2 | 14 | 7 | 1 | 2 | 103 | 55 |
| Al-Wehda | 2016–17 | Pro League | 23 | 16 | 2 | 1 | 2 | 0 | — | | — | | 27 | 17 |
| Al-Hilal | 2017–18 | Pro League | 7 | 2 | 2 | 0 | — | | 6 (Note: 2 appearances in 2017 ACL and 4 appearances in the 2018 edition) | 0 | — | | 15 | 2 |
| Al-Hilal | 2018–19 | Pro League | 0 | 0 | 0 | 0 | 0 | 0 | 0 | 0 | 1 (Note: Appearances in Arab Club Champions Cup) | 0 | 1 | 0 |
| Al-Hilal | Al-Hilal Total | | 7 | 2 | 2 | 0 | 0 | 0 | 6 | 0 | 1 | 0 | 16 | 2 |
| Al-Qadsiah | 2018–19 | Pro League | 7 | 0 | 0 | 0 | — | | — | | — | | 7 | 0 |
| Al-Shoulla | 2019–20 | MS League | 1 | 0 | 0 | 0 | — | | — | | — | | 1 | 0 |
| Jeddah | 2020–21 | MS League | 13 | 3 | — | | — | | — | | — | | 13 | 3 |
| Al-Tai | 2020–21 | MS League | 11 | 0 | — | | — | | — | | — | | 11 | 0 |
| Career total | | | 211 | 70 | 25 | 18 | 15 | 4 | 20 | 7 | 2 | 2 | 273 | 101 |

=== International ===
Appearances and goals by national team and year
| National team | Year | Apps | Goals |
|---|---|---|---|
Saudi Arabia
| Saudi Arabia | 2009 | 1 | 0 |
| Saudi Arabia | 2010 | 0 | 0 |
| Saudi Arabia | 2011 | 0 | 0 |
| Saudi Arabia | 2012 | 1 | 0 |
| Saudi Arabia | 2013 | 0 | 0 |
| Saudi Arabia | 2014 | 3 | 0 |
| Saudi Arabia | 2015 | 2 | 0 |
| Saudi Arabia | 2016 | 1 | 0 |
| Saudi Arabia | 2017 | 4 | 2 |
| Total | | 12 | 2 |

==== International goals ====
Scores and results list Saudi Arabia's goal tally first.

| No | Date | Venue | Opponent | Score | Result | Competition |
|---|---|---|---|---|---|---|
| 1. | 7 November 2017 | Estádio Nacional, Lisbon, Portugal | Latvia | 2–0 | 2–0 | Friendly |
| 2. | 22 December 2017 | Jaber Al-Ahmad International Stadium, Kuwait City, Kuwait | Kuwait | 2–0 | 2–1 | 23rd Arabian Gulf Cup |

== Honors ==
Al Shabab

- Saudi Professional League: 2011–12

Al Ittihad

- Kings Cup: 2013

Al Hilal

- Saudi Professional League: 2017–18
- Saudi Super Cup: 2018
