= Abdulaziz Oboshqra =

Saudi Arabian footballer

Personal information
- Full name: Abdulaziz Yousef Oboshqra
- Date of birth: November 23, 1981 (age 44)
- Place of birth: Al-Hasa, Saudi Arabia
- Height: 1.79 m (5 ft 10 1/2 in)
- Position: Right back

Youth career
- Hajer

Senior career*
Years	Team	Apps	(Gls)
2002–2012	Hajer		
2010	→ Al-Adalah (loan)		
2012–2017	Al-Fateh	102	(2)
2017	Al-Nojoom		
2017–2018	Al-Nahda		
2018–2019	Al Jeel		
- * Club domestic league appearances and goals

Abdulaziz Oboshqra (Arabic: عبد العزيز بو شقراء; born 23 November 1981) is a Saudi football player.

== Honours ==
Al-Fateh SC

- Saudi Professional League: 2012–13
- Saudi Super Cup: 2013
