= 2012–13 Saudi Pro League =

Professional League
- Season: 2012–2013
- Dates: 2 August 2012 – 27 April 2013
- Champions: Al-Fateh (1st title)
- Relegated: Hajer; Al-Wehda
- AFC Champions League: Al-Fateh; Al-Ittihad; Al-Hilal; Al-Shabab
- GCC Champions League: Al-Raed; Al-Shoulla
- Matches: 182
- Goals: 531 (2.92 per match)
- Top goalscorer: Sebastián Tagliabué (19 goals)
- Biggest home win: Al-Hilal 6–0 Al-Raed (28 September 2012)
- Biggest away win: Najran 0–6 Al-Hilal (23 August 2012)
- Highest scoring: Al-Wehda 2–5 Al-Shabab (28 August 2012); Al-Faisaly 4–3 Al-Wehda (19 October 2012); Al-Faisaly 6–1 Najran (18 April 2013)
- Longest winning run: 10 games Al-Hilal
- Longest unbeaten run: 17 games Al-Fateh
- Longest winless run: 19 games Al-Wehda
- Longest losing run: 11 games Al-Wehda
- Highest attendance: 28,188; Al-Ahli 1–1 Al-Ittihad (14 February 2013)
- Lowest attendance: 60; Al-Shoulla 1–1 Al-Faisaly (30 January 2013)
- Average attendance: 3,544

The 2012–13 Saudi Professional League (known as the Zain Professional League for sponsorship reasons) was the 37th season of the Saudi Pro League, the top Saudi professional league for association football clubs, since its establishment in 1976. The season began on 2 August 2012 and ended on 27 April 2013. Al-Shabab were the defending champions. The league was contested by the 12 teams from the 2011–12 season as well as Al-Shoulla and Al-Wehda, who joined as the promoted clubs from the 2011–12 First Division. They replace Al-Ansar and Al-Qadsiah who were relegated to the 2012–13 First Division.

On 14 April, Al-Fateh won their first league title, with two games to spare, following a 1–0 home win over Al-Ahli. Al-Fateh became the seventh club to win the Pro League. This is considered by many to be one of the greatest shocks in Saudi football history, especially considering that Al-Fateh were promoted to the Pro League for the first time only four years earlier.

Al-Wehda were the first team to be relegated following a 2–1 home defeat to Al-Faisaly on 29 March. Hajer became the second and final team to be relegated following a 2–1 defeat away to Al-Shabab on the final matchday.

== Teams ==
Fourteen teams competed in the league – the twelve teams from the previous season and the two teams promoted from the First Division. The promoted teams were Al-Shoulla (returning after an absence of eight seasons) and Al-Wehda (returning after a season's absence). They replaced Al-Qadsiah (ending their three-year top-flight spell) and Al-Ansar (who were relegated after one season in the top flight).

=== Stadiums and locations ===
Locations of teams in the 2012–13 Saudi Professional League

Note: Table lists in alphabetical order.

Team	Location	Stadium	Capacity
Al-Ahli	Jeddah	Prince Abdullah Al-Faisal Stadium; King Abdul Aziz Stadium (Note: Al-Ahli and Al-Ittihad played at the King Abdul Aziz Stadium, from 23 November onwards, due to the expansion of the Prince Abdullah Al-Faisal stadium.)	25,000; 33,195
Al-Ettifaq	Dammam	Prince Mohamed bin Fahd Stadium	21,701
Al-Faisaly	Harmah	Prince Salman Sport City Stadium	5,200
Al-Fateh	Al-Hasa	Prince Abdullah bin Jalawi Stadium	19,096
Al-Hilal	Riyadh	King Fahd International Stadium; Prince Faisal bin Fahd Stadium	62,685; 22,500
Al-Ittihad	Jeddah	Prince Abdullah Al-Faisal Stadium; King Abdul Aziz Stadium	25,000; 33,195
Al-Nassr	Riyadh	King Fahd International Stadium; Prince Faisal bin Fahd Stadium	62,685; 22,500
Al-Raed	Buraidah	King Abdullah Sport City Stadium	23,600
Al-Shabab	Riyadh	King Fahd International Stadium; Prince Faisal bin Fahd Stadium	62,685; 22,500
Al-Shoulla	Al-Kharj	Al-Shoulla Club Stadium	8,000
Al-Taawoun	Buraidah	King Abdullah Sport City Stadium	23,600
Al-Wehda	Mecca	King Abdul Aziz Stadium	33,195
Hajer	Al-Hasa	Prince Abdullah bin Jalawi Stadium	19,096
Najran	Najran	Al Akhdoud Club Stadium	3,200

=== Personnel and kits ===
Team	Manager	Captain	Kit manufacturer	Shirt sponsor
Al-Ahli	(Serbia) Aleksandar Ilić	(Saudi Arabia) Taisir Al-Jassim	Umbro	STC, Toyota^{1}, ExxonMobil^{2}
Al-Ettifaq	(Poland) Maciej Skorża	(Saudi Arabia) Saleh Bashir	Puma	Toyota^{1}
Al-Faisaly	(Belgium) Marc Brys	(Saudi Arabia) Omar Abdulaziz	Joma	ALDREES, Roco^{2}
Al-Fateh	(Tunisia) Fathi Al-Jabal	(Saudi Arabia) Hamdan Al-Hamdan	Lotto	Kia Motors, Fuchsia^{1}
Al-Hilal	(Croatia) Zlatko Dalić	(Saudi Arabia) Salman Al-Faraj	Adidas	Mobily
Al-Ittihad	(Spain) Beñat San José	(Saudi Arabia) Mohammed Noor	SportONE	STC, Toyota^{1}, ExxonMobil^{2}
Al-Nassr	(Uruguay) José Daniel Carreño	(Saudi Arabia) Hussein Abdulghani	NFC	STC, Toyota^{1}, ExxonMobil^{2}
Al-Raed	(North Macedonia) Vlatko Kostov	(Morocco) Issam Erraki	Hattrick	Al-Remeikhany, Al Qassim National Hospital^{1}
Al-Shabab	(Belgium) Michel Preud'homme	(Saudi Arabia) Ahmed Otaif	Adidas	STC, Toyota^{1}, ExxonMobil^{2}
Al-Shoulla	(Tunisia) Ahmad Al-Ajlani	(Saudi Arabia) Burj Maodah	Hattrick	Anfal Dalton
Al-Taawoun	(Algeria) Taoufik Rouabah	(Saudi Arabia) Ahmed Al-Harbi	Hattrick	
Al-Wehda	(Tunisia) Khalil Obaid	(Saudi Arabia) Sulaiman Amido	Hattrick	
Hajer	(Egypt) Tarek Yehia	(Saudi Arabia) Mansoor Al-Najai	Uhlsport	
Najran	(North Macedonia) Gjoko Hadžievski	(Saudi Arabia) Saheb Al-Abdullah	Adidas	

- ^{1} On the back of the strip.
- ^{2} On the right sleeve of the strip.

=== Managerial changes ===
Team	Outgoing manager	Manner of departure	Date of vacancy	Position in table	Incoming manager	Date of appointment
Al-Ettifaq	(Croatia) Branko Ivanković	Sacked	29 April 2012	Pre-season	(Saudi Arabia) Sameer Hilal (caretaker)	29 April 2012
Al-Faisaly	(Croatia) Zlatko Dalić	End of contract	30 April 2012	Pre-season	(Belgium) Marc Brys	2 June 2012
Al-Taawoun	(Egypt) Khalid Kamal (caretaker)	End of caretaker period	30 April 2012	Pre-season	(North Macedonia) Gjoko Hadžievski	6 May 2012
Al-Ettifaq	(Saudi Arabia) Sameer Hilal (caretaker)	End of caretaker period	1 May 2012	Pre-season	(Tunisia) Ammar Souayah	1 May 2012
Najran	(North Macedonia) Gjoko Hadžievski	Signed by Al-Taawoun	6 May 2012	Pre-season	(Serbia) Miodrag Ješić	31 May 2012
Al-Hilal	(Czech Republic) Ivan Hašek	Sacked	11 May 2012	Pre-season	(France) Antoine Kombouaré	28 June 2012
Al-Ettifaq	(Tunisia) Ammar Souayah	End of contract	30 May 2012	Pre-season	(Switzerland) Alain Geiger	7 June 2012
Al-Wehda	(Egypt) Bashir Abdel Samad	Resigned	30 August 2012	14th	(Saudi Arabia) Badr Hawsawi (caretaker)	30 August 2012
Al-Nassr	(Colombia) Francisco Maturana	Sacked	2 September 2012	6th	(Uruguay) Alejandro Dutra (caretaker)	2 September 2012
Al-Nassr	(Uruguay) Alejandro Dutra (caretaker)	End of caretaker period	15 September 2012	6th	(Uruguay) José Daniel Carreño	15 September 2012
Al-Wehda	(Saudi Arabia) Badr Hawsawi (caretaker)	End of caretaker period	18 September 2012	14th	(Tunisia) Wajdi Essid	18 September 2012
Al-Ettifaq	(Switzerland) Alain Geiger	Sacked	19 September 2012	10th	(Poland) Maciej Skorża	19 September 2012
Hajer	(Brazil) Ednaldo Patricio	Sacked	29 September 2012	11th	(Brazil) Luiz Neto (caretaker)	29 September 2012
Hajer	(Brazil) Luiz Neto (caretaker)	End of caretaker period	4 October 2012	12th	(Egypt) Tarek Yehia	4 October 2012
Al-Shoulla	(Egypt) Mohamed Salah	Sacked	31 December 2012	13th	(Tunisia) Ahmad Al-Ajlani	1 January 2013
Najran	(Serbia) Miodrag Ješić	Sacked	2 January 2013	8th	(Tunisia) Khemais Labidi	6 January 2013
Al-Wehda	(Tunisia) Wajdi Essid	Sacked	27 January 2013	14th	(Tunisia) Khalil Obaid	27 January 2013
Al-Hilal	(France) Antoine Kombouaré	Sacked	31 January 2013	2nd	(Croatia) Zlatko Dalić	31 January 2013
Al-Raed	(Tunisia) Ammar Souayah	Resigned	1 February 2013	9th	(North Macedonia) Vlatko Kostov	2 February 2013
Al-Taawoun	(North Macedonia) Gjoko Hadžievski	Sacked	21 February 2013	11th	(Algeria) Taoufik Rouabah	25 February 2013
Al-Ittihad	(Spain) Raúl Caneda	Sacked	23 February 2013	7th	(Spain) Beñat San José	23 February 2013
Al-Ahli	(Czech Republic) Karel Jarolím	Sacked	28 February 2013	5th	(Serbia) Aleksandar Ilić	28 February 2013
Najran	(Tunisia) Khemais Labidi	Sacked	1 March 2013	9th	(Saudi Arabia) Alhassan Al-Yami (caretaker)	1 March 2013
Najran	(Saudi Arabia) Alhassan Al-Yami (caretaker)	End of caretaker period	6 March 2013	8th	(North Macedonia) Gjoko Hadžievski	6 March 2013

=== Foreign players ===
The number of foreign players is restricted to four per team, including a slot for a player from AFC countries.

Players name in bold indicates the player is registered during the mid-season transfer window.

Club	Player 1	Player 2	Player 3	AFC player	Former players
Al-Ahli	(Brazil) **Bruno César**	(Brazil) Victor Simões	(Colombia) Jairo Palomino	(Oman) Amad Al-Hosni	(Argentina) Diego Morales
Al-Ettifaq	(Brazil) Carlos Santos	(Ghana) **Prince Tagoe**		(Oman) Ahmed Kano	(Brazil) Cássio (Brazil) Júnior Xuxa
Al-Faisaly	(France) Christophe Grondin	(Guinea) Naby Soumah	(Jordan) Yaseen Al-Bakhit	(Oman) Ismail Al-Ajmi	
Al-Fateh	(Brazil) Élton Arábia	(Democratic Republic of the Congo) Doris Fuakumputu	(Senegal) Kemekho Cissokho	(Jordan) Shadi Abu Hash'hash	
Al-Hilal	(Brazil) **Ozéia**	(Brazil) Wesley	(Colombia) **Gustavo Bolívar**	(South Korea) Yoo Byung-soo	(Morocco) Adil Hermach (Senegal) Kader Mangane
Al-Ittihad	(Brazil) **Bill**	(Cameroon) Modeste M'bami	(Hungary) **György Sándor**	(Croatia) Anas Sharbini ^{1}	(Brazil) Diego Souza (Morocco) Faouzi Abdelghani
Al-Nassr	(Brazil) **Rafael Bastos**	(Egypt) Hosny Abd Rabo	(Greece) **Angelos Charisteas**	(Bahrain) **Mohamed Husain**	(Argentina) Damián Manso (Ecuador) Jaime Ayoví (Uzbekistan) Shavkat Mullajanov
Al-Raed	(Brazil) Xuxa	(Democratic Republic of the Congo) Yves Diba Ilunga	(Morocco) Issam Erraki	(Oman) Abdul Salam Al-Mukhaini	
Al-Shabab	(Argentina) Sebastián Tagliabúe	(Brazil) Fernando Menegazzo	(Brazil) Marcelo Camacho	(South Korea) **Kwak Tae-hwi**	(Colombia) Mario Benítez (Uzbekistan) Server Djeparov
Al-Shoulla	(Mali) Lassana Fané	(Mali) **Mamadou Kondo**	(Morocco) Hassan Taïr	(Bahrain) Abdulla Baba Fatadi	(Ghana) Philip Boampong
Al-Taawoun	(Croatia) **Dario Jertec**	(Guinea) Thierno Bah	(Nigeria) **Waheed Oseni**	(Oman) **Abdul Aziz Al-Muqbali**	(Algeria) Hadj Bouguèche (Jordan) Mohammad Al-Basha (Slovenia) Dejan Rusič
Al-Wehda	(Brazil) **Thiago Gomes**	(Brazil) **Vinícius Reche**	(Norway) **Pa-Modou Kah**	(Croatia) **Ahmad Sharbini** ^{2}	(Mali) Sékou Doumbia (Sudan) Mohamed Ahmed Bashir
Hajer	(Egypt) **Ahmed Bakri**	(Egypt) **Ayman Abdel-Aziz**	(Ivory Coast) **Oussou Konan Anicet**	(Palestine) Abdelatif Bahdari	(Cameroon) Moustapha Moctar Belbi (Ghana) Godwin Attram (Jordan) Hazem Jawdat
Najran	(Algeria) Farid Cheklam	(Jordan) Hamza Al-Dardour	(Syria) Jehad Al-Hussain	(Syria) Wael Ayan	

- **^1** Anas Sharbini has Jordanian citizenship and was counted as an Asian player.
- **^2** Ahmad Sharbini has Jordanian citizenship and was counted as an Asian player.

== League table ==
Pos	Team	Pld	W	D	L	GF	GA	GD	Pts	Qualification or relegation
1	Al-Fateh (C)	26	20	4	2	52	23	+29	64	Qualification for the AFC Champions League group stage
2	Al-Hilal	26	17	5	4	62	26	+36	56	Qualification for the AFC Champions League group stage
3	Al-Shabab	26	17	5	4	53	36	+17	56	Qualification for the AFC Champions League group stage
4	Al-Nassr	26	14	8	4	41	24	+17	50	
5	Al-Ahli	26	12	8	6	51	33	+18	44	
6	Al-Ettifaq	26	9	8	9	33	38	−5	35	
7	Al-Ittihad	26	8	9	9	36	36	0	33	Qualification for the AFC Champions League group stage (Note: Al-Ittihad qualified for the AFC Champions League group stage as 2013 King Cup of Champions winners.)
8	Al-Raed	26	7	11	8	30	41	−11	32	Qualification for the GCC Champions League
9	Al-Shoulla	26	8	6	12	32	42	−10	30	Qualification for the GCC Champions League
10	Najran	26	6	7	13	31	52	−21	25	
11	Al-Faisaly	26	6	6	14	35	43	−8	24	
12	Al-Taawoun	26	3	10	13	25	37	−12	19	
13	Hajer (R)	26	3	7	16	24	48	−24	16	Relegation to the First Division
14	Al-Wehda (R)	26	2	6	18	26	52	−26	12	Relegation to the First Division

Source: SLstat
Rules for classification: 1) Points; 2) Total goal difference; 3) Total goals scored; 4) Head-to-head points; 5) Head-to-head goal difference; 6) Play-off (only for deciding champion, relegation and AFC competitions participation).
(C) Champions; (R) Relegated

== Results ==
Home \ Away	AHL	ETT	FSY	FAT	HIL	ITT	NSR	RAE	SHB	SHO	TWN	WHD	HJR	NAJ
Al-Ahli		0–2	2–1	3–3	1–1	1–1	2–1	1–2	1–0	5–0	1–1	2–1	0–0	5–1
Al-Ettifaq	1–4		1–1	0–4	2–2	0–0	1–3	1–0	3–1	0–2	2–0	1–1	3–1	2–2
Al-Faisaly	0–3	2–3		0–0	0–1	0–2	1–2	2–2	1–3	0–2	2–1	4–3	3–0	6–1
Al-Fateh	1–0	1–0	1–0		2–1	2–1	1–1	2–1	1–2	2–1	2–1	3–1	3–0	4–2
Al-Hilal	4–1	1–1	1–0	1–2		4–2	0–1	6–0	3–0	4–2	0–0	2–0	2–0	3–1
Al-Ittihad	1–3	3–0	2–2	0–2	1–2		1–1	2–2	1–2	1–0	2–1	1–0	2–2	2–0
Al-Nassr	2–2	2–0	2–1	0–0	1–3	0–1		4–0	0–0	3–1	3–2	3–1	1–0	1–1
Al-Raed	1–1	1–1	1–0	1–3	1–2	2–2	0–2		0–1	2–2	1–0	1–1	3–2	1–1
Al-Shabab	2–2	3–1	3–2	2–4	3–2	2–2	2–1	2–2		2–1	2–1	3–1	2–1	4–0
Al-Shoulla	1–3	0–1	1–1	2–3	1–3	1–0	1–2	0–0	1–1		1–0	1–0	0–0	1–5
Al-Taawoun	2–1	1–1	2–0	0–1	1–4	3–3	1–2	2–2	0–1	1–1		1–1	0–0	1–2
Al-Wehda	1–3	0–3	1–2	2–1	1–2	2–1	1–1	0–1	2–5	2–3	1–1		1–2	1–2
Hajer	1–4	2–3	3–3	1–2	2–2	0–2	0–1	1–2	1–2	0–4	0–1	2–0		1–0
Najran	2–0	1–0	0–1	0–2	0–6	2–0	1–1	0–1	2–3	1–2	1–1	1–1	2–2	

Updated to match(es) played on 27 April 2013. Source: SLstat.com
Legend: Blue = home team win; Yellow = draw; Red = away team win.

== Season statistics ==
=== Scoring ===
==== Top scorers ====
Rank	Player	Club	Goals
1	(Argentina) Sebastián Tagliabué	Al-Shabab	19
2	(Brazil) Wesley	Al-Hilal	17
2	(Democratic Republic of the Congo) Doris Fuakumputu	Al-Fateh	17
4	(Saudi Arabia) Yasser Al-Qahtani	Al-Hilal	13
5	(Brazil) Victor Simões	Al-Ahli	12
5	(Morocco) Hassan Taïr	Al-Shoulla	12
7	(Brazil) Élton Arábia	Al-Fateh	11
8	(Democratic Republic of the Congo) Yves Diba Ilunga	Al-Raed	10
8	(Jordan) Hamza Al-Dardour	Najran	10
8	(Saudi Arabia) Mohammad Al-Sahlawi	Al-Nassr	10
8	(Saudi Arabia) Nasser Al-Shamrani	Al-Shabab	10
8	(South Korea) Yoo Byung-soo	Al-Hilal	10

==== Hat-tricks ====
Player	For	Against	Result	Date	Ref
(Argentina) Sebastián Tagliabué	Al-Shabab	Al-Faisaly	3–1 (A)	7 August 2012	
(Brazil) Wesley	Al-Hilal	Najran	6–0 (A)	23 August 2012	
(Saudi Arabia) Yasser Al-Qahtani	Al-Hilal	Al-Raed	6–0 (H)	28 September 2012	
(Brazil) Victor Simões	Al-Ahli	Al-Shoulla	3–1 (A)	4 December 2012	
(Saudi Arabia) Zamil Al-Sulim	Al-Ettifaq	Hajer	3–2 (A)	8 March 2013	

Notes

(H) – Home team
(A) – Away team

=== Clean sheets ===
Rank	Player	Club	Clean sheets
1	(Saudi Arabia) Abdullah Al-Enezi	Al-Nassr	7
1	(Saudi Arabia) Khaled Naseer	Al-Shoulla	7
3	(Saudi Arabia) Abdullah Al-Owaishir	Al-Fateh	6
3	(Saudi Arabia) Abdullah Al-Sudairy	Al-Hilal	6
5	(Saudi Arabia) Mabrouk Zaid	Al-Ittihad	5
6	(Saudi Arabia) Fahad Al-Thunayan	Al-Taawoun	4
6	(Saudi Arabia) Fayz Al-Sabiay	Al-Ettifaq	4
6	(Saudi Arabia) Mohammad Sharifi	Al-Fateh	4
6	(Saudi Arabia) Mustafa Malayekah	Hajer	4

=== Discipline ===
==== Player ====
- Most yellow cards: 8
  - (Mali) Lassana Fané (Al-Shoulla)
  - (Palestine) Abdelatif Bahdari (Hajer)
  - (Saudi Arabia) Majed Ali (Najran)
- Most red cards: 1
  - 22 players

==== Club ====
- Most yellow cards: 60
  - Hajer
- Most red cards: 4
  - Al-Nassr

== Attendances ==
=== By team ===
Pos	Team	Total	High	Low	Average	Change
1	Al-Ittihad	115,892	25,026	1,077	8,915	+26.9%
2	Al-Ahli	95,402	28,188	1,884	7,339	−33.5%
3	Al-Fateh	79,947	21,037	856	6,150	+330.1%
4	Al-Hilal	76,800	18,437	1,349	5,908	−20.9%
5	Al-Nassr	51,604	14,162	657	3,970	−4.0%
6	Al-Raed	47,496	10,311	508	3,654	−48.9%
7	Al-Taawoun	37,285	8,285	408	2,868	−58.9%
8	Al-Ettifaq	35,221	9,740	111	2,709	−33.1%
9	Al-Shabab	33,187	8,635	353	2,553	−5.8%
10	Hajer	20,044	5,386	117	1,542	+11.8%
11	Al-Wehda	15,279	3,914	120	1,175	n/a †
12	Najran	14,040	3,500	107	1,080	+25.7%
13	Al-Faisaly	13,867	2,167	215	1,067	−11.4%
14	Al-Shoulla	8,858	3,455	60	681	n/a †
	League total	644,922	28,188	60	3,544	−19.0%

Updated to games played on 27 April 2013
Notes:
^{†} Teams played previous season in First Division.

== Awards ==
On 7 February 2014, it was announced that both Al-Riyadiya Awards and Arriyadiyah Awards for Sports Excellence would be merged and known as the Arriyadiyah Awards for Sports Excellence. The Arriyadiyah Awards for Sports Excellence were awarded for the seventh time since its inception in 2007. The awards were sponsored by Saudi newspaper Arriyadiyah and Saudi sports network Al-Riyadiya. The awards were presented on 16 February 2014.

Award	Winner	Club
Player of the Season	(gold) (Brazil) Élton Arábia; (silver) (Saudi Arabia) Hamdan Al-Hamdan; (bronze) (Saudi Arabia) Ahmed Otaif	Al-Fateh; Al-Fateh; Al-Shabab
Young Player of the Season	(gold) (Saudi Arabia) Fahad Al-Muwallad; (silver) (Saudi Arabia) Mustafa Bassas; (bronze) (Saudi Arabia) Ayman Ftayni	Al-Ittihad; Al-Ahli; Al-Nassr
Golden Boot	(Argentina) Sebastián Tagliabué	Al-Shabab
