= 2013 King Cup of Champions =

Tournament details
- Country: Saudi Arabia
- Dates: 4 – 29 May 2013
- Teams: 8

Final positions
- Champions: Al-Ittihad
- Runners-up: Al-Shabab

Tournament statistics
- Matches played: 14
- Goals scored: 45 (3.21 per match)
- Top goal scorer(s): Mukhtar Fallatah; Muhannad Assiri (4 goals)

The 2013 King Cup of Champions, or The Custodian of the Two Holy Mosques Cup, was the 38th season of King Cup of Champions since its establishment in 1957, and the 6th under the current edition. The top eight in the Professional League competed in the King cup which kicked off on 4 May. Al-Ahli were the defending champion but they were eliminated by Al-Shabab in semifinals.

Al-Ittihad won their eighth title after beating Al-Shabab 4–2 in the final, and qualified to the Champions League.

== Prize money ==
- Final winner: 4,000,000 Saudi Riyals.
- Final runners-up: 2,500,000 Saudi Riyals.
- Third place: 1,500,000 Saudi Riyals.

== Participating teams ==
Team	Qualifying method	App*	Last App
Al-Fateh	2012–13 Professional League champions	3rd	2012
Al-Hilal	2012–13 Professional League runners up	6th	2012
Al-Shabab	2012–13 Professional League 3rd place	6th	2012
Al-Nassr	2012–13 Professional League 4th place	6th	2012
Al-Ahli	2012–13 Professional League 5th place	6th	2012
Al-Ettifaq	2012–13 Professional League 6th place	5th	2012
Al-Ittihad	2012–13 Professional League 7th place	6th	2012
Al-Raed	2012–13 Professional League 8th place	1st	none

* Number of appearance in King Cup of Champions since the 2008 season.

== Fixtures and results ==
=== Bracket ===
Quarter-finals
7	Al-Ittihad	3	1	4
2	Al-Hilal	2	1	3
1	Al-Fateh	2	2	4
6	Al-Ettifaq	2	1	3
5	Al-Ahli	3	3	6
4	Al-Nassr	1	1	2
8	Al-Raed	0	1	1
3	Al-Shabab	2	3	5

Semi-finals
7	Al-Ittihad	2	4	6
1	Al-Fateh	0	0	0
5	Al-Ahli	1	0	1
3	Al-Shabab	0	2	2

Final
7	Al-Ittihad	4
3	Al-Shabab	2
Third place
5	Al-Ahli	2
1	Al-Fateh	0

=== Quarter-finals ===
Quarter-finals were played on 4, 5, 8, & 9 May 2013.

==== First leg ====
4 May 2013	Al-Ahli	3–1	Al-Nassr	Makkah
20:45 (UTC+3)	Bruno César 11' (pen.); Al-Hosni 26', 45'		57' Ghaleb	Stadium: King Abdul Aziz Stadium

5 May 2013	Al-Fateh	2–2	Al-Ettifaq	Al-Hasa
18:55 (UTC+3)	Al-Hamdan 2'; Doris 90'		39' Al-Hamed; 79' Al-Salem	Stadium: Prince Abdullah bin Jalawi Stadium

5 May 2013	Al-Raed	0–2	Al-Shabab	Buraidah
19:05 (UTC+3)			6' Assiri; 69' Al-Dawsari	Stadium: King Abdullah Sport City Stadium

5 May 2013	Al-Ittihad	3–2	Al-Hilal	Makkah
20:45 (UTC+3)	Fallatah 34' (pen.), 46'; Al-Ghamdi 82'		5' Al-Shalhoub; 48' Wesley	Stadium: King Abdul Aziz Stadium

==== Second leg ====
8 May 2013	Al-Nassr	1–3	Al-Ahli	Riyadh
20:45 (UTC+3)	Al-Sahlawi 35'		37' Bruno César; 67' Al-Hosni; 71' Palomino	Stadium: King Fahd International Stadium

9 May 2013	Al-Ettifaq	1–2	Al-Fateh	Dammam
18:55 (UTC+3)	Al-Dossari 43'		70', 74' Al-Hamdan	Stadium: Prince Mohamed bin Fahd Stadium

9 May 2013	Al-Shabab	3–1	Al-Raed	Riyadh
19:05 (UTC+3)	Al-Dawsari 41'; Al-Shamrani 69'; Assiri 88'		74' Yves Diba Ilunga	Stadium: Prince Faisal bin Fahd Stadium

9 May 2013	Al-Hilal	1–1	Al-Ittihad	Riyadh
20:45 (UTC+3)	Al-Abed 7'		81' Al-Ghamdi	Stadium: King Fahd International Stadium

=== Semi-finals ===
Semi-finals were played on 17, 18, 24, & 25 May 2013.

==== First leg ====
17 May 2013	Al-Ittihad	2–0	Al-Fateh	Makkah
20:50 (UTC+3)	Fallatah 30'; Qassem 83'			Stadium: King Abdul Aziz Stadium

18 May 2013	Al-Ahli	1–0	Al-Shabab	Makkah
20:50 (UTC+3)	Al-Harbi 60'			Stadium: King Abdul Aziz Stadium

==== Second leg ====
24 May 2013	Al-Fateh	0–4	Al-Ittihad	Al-Hasa
18:55 (UTC+3)			42' Al-Fraidi; 45+2' Al-Muwallad; 60' Abousaban; 89' Hazazi	Stadium: Prince Abdullah bin Jalawi Stadium

25 May 2013	Al-Shabab	2–0	Al-Ahli	Riyadh
19:05 (UTC+3)	Assiri 22', 34'			Stadium: Prince Faisal bin Fahd Stadium

=== Third place ===
Third place game was played on 28 May 2013.

28 May 2013	Al-Ahli	2–0	Al-Fateh	Makkah
20:00 (UTC+3)	Bassas 2'; Al-Mehyani 28'			Stadium: King Abdul Aziz Stadium

=== Final ===
29 May 2013
21:00 (UTC+3)

Al-Ittihad	4–2	Al-Shabab
Fallatah 48'; Al-Muwallad 57'; Hazazi 73'; György Sándor 90+1'	Report	69', 82' Al-Shamrani

King Fahd International Stadium, Riyadh
Referee: Marai Al-Awaji

==== Winner ====
2013 King Cup of Champions
Winners
Al-Ittihad
8th Title
