= Mohammad Sharifi =

Saudi Arabian footballer

Personal information
- Full name: Mohammad Sharifi
- Date of birth: December 10, 1978 (age 47)
- Place of birth: Riyadh, Saudi Arabia
- Height: 1.88 m (6 ft 2 in)
- Position: Goalkeeper

Youth career
- Al-Nassr

Senior career*
Years	Team	Apps	(Gls)
1998–2009	Al-Nassr		
2009–2013	Al Fateh		
2013–2014	Ettifaq FC		
2014–2015	Najran SC		
2015	Al-Nahda		
2016	Al-Wehda		
2016–2017	Al-Raed		

International career
2003–2005	Saudi Arabia	6	(0)
- * Club domestic league appearances and goals

Mohammad Sharifi (Arabic: محمد شريفي; born 10 December 1978) is a Saudi Arabian former football who played as a goalkeeper.

== Club career ==
Sharifi was in Al-Nasr's squad for the 2000 FIFA Club World Championship.

== International career ==
Sharifi made one appearance with the senior Saudi Arabia national football team during the 2006 FIFA World Cup qualifying rounds.
