= Bashir Abdel Samad =

Egyptian footballer (1966–2023)

Personal information
- Date of birth: August 20, 1966
- Place of birth: Toukh, Egypt
- Date of death: 19 October 2023 (aged 57)
- Place of death: Egypt
- Position: Forward

Senior career*
Years	Team	Apps	(Gls)
1983–1990	Shabab Toukh Club		
1990–2001	Ismaily		

International career
1992–1994	Egypt	14	(2)

Managerial career
- 2011: Al-Wehda
- 2012: Al-Wehda
- 2013–2014: Al-Tai
- * Club domestic league appearances and goals

Beshir Abdel Samad (Arabic: بشير عبد الصمد; 20 August 1966 – 19 October 2023) was an Egyptian footballer. He played club football for Ismaily.

Abdel Samad played for the Egypt national football team at the 1994 African Cup of Nations. He also managed Saudi Arabian club Al-Tai during the 2013–14 season.

== Career statistics ==
=== International ===
Appearances and goals by national team and year
National team	Year	Apps	Goals
Egypt	1992	1	0
Egypt	1993	7	0
Egypt	1994	6	2
Total		14	2

Scores and results list Egypt's goal tally first, score column indicates score after each Abdel Samad goal.

List of international goals scored by Bashir Abdel Samad
No.	Date	Venue	Opponent	Score	Result	Competition
1	28 March 1994	Chedly Zouiten Stadium, Tunis, Tunisia	Gabon	3–0	2–2	1994 Africa Cup of Nations
2	28 March 1994	Chedly Zouiten Stadium, Tunis, Tunisia	Gabon	4–0	2–2	1994 Africa Cup of Nations
