= José Daniel Carreño =

Uruguayan footballer and manager (born 1963)

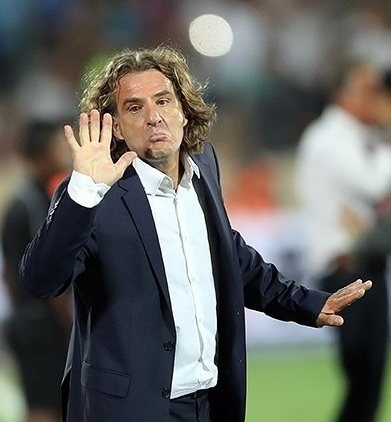
- Carreño in 2016

Personal information
- Full name: José Daniel Carreño Izquierdo
- Date of birth: 1 May 1963 (age 63)
- Place of birth: Montevideo, Uruguay
- Height: 1.85 m (6 ft 1 in)
- Position: Striker

Team information
- Current team: Nacional (manager)

Youth career
- 1973–1977: Wanderers

Senior career*
Years	Team	Apps	(Gls)
1977–1985	Montevideo Wanderers		
1985–1988	Lens		
1988	Nacional		
1988–1990	Montevideo Wanderers		

Managerial career
- 2000–2001: Montevideo Wanderers
- 2002–2003: Nacional
- 2004: LDU Quito
- 2005–2007: Montevideo Wanderers
- 2007: Nacional
- 2008: Deportivo Cali
- 2010–2011: Montevideo Wanderers
- 2012: Palestino
- 2012–2014: Al-Nassr
- 2014–2015: Al-Arabi
- 2015–2016: Qatar
- 2017–2018: Al-Shabab
- 2018: Al-Nassr
- 2019–2020: Al-Wehda
- 2020–2022: Montevideo Wanderers
- 2023–2024: Al-Hazem
- 2024–2025: Al-Wehda
- 2025: Montevideo Wanderers
- 2025–2026: Al-Riyadh
- 2026–: Nacional
Medal record
Men's association football
Representing Uruguay
Pan American Games
Gold medal – first place	1983 Caracas	Team
- * Club domestic league appearances and goals

José Daniel Carreño Izquierdo (Latin American Spanish: [xoˈse ðaˈnjel kaˈreɲojsˈkjeɾðo]; born 1 May 1963) is a Uruguayan football manager and former player. He is the current manager of Nacional.

Commonly known as "El Crespo" ([el ˈkɾespo]; Spanish word: "The curly"), Carreño played as a striker and spent the majority of his playing career at Montevideo Wanderers, having also spells in Lens and Nacional; with the latter, he won the Intercontinental Cup and the Copa Libertadores, his two unique titles in his career. Carreño had his most successful spell as a manager with Al-Nassr, winning the League and Crown Prince Cup double in 2014.

== Coaching career ==
=== Al-Nassr ===
In September 2012, it was announced that Jose Daniel Carreno would take over as manager of Saudi Professional League club Al-Nassr after replacing Francisco Maturana.

=== Al-Hazem ===
On 20 October 2023, Al-Hazem announced the appointment of Carreño as manager. He left the club on 19 April 2024 by mutual consent.

=== Statistics ===
As of 19 April 2024

Team	Nat	From	To	Record				
Team	Nat	From	To	G	W	D	L	Win %
Montevideo Wanderers	(Uruguay)	3 March 2010	31 December 2011	54	18	15	21	33.33
Palestino	(Chile)	1 January 2012	13 June 2012	18	5	4	9	27.78
Al Nassr	(Saudi Arabia)	5 September 2012	1 May 2014	62	43	11	8	69.35
Al-Arabi	(Qatar)	1 December 2014	1 June 2015	20	12	4	4	60.00
Qatar	(Qatar)	1 June 2015	22 September 2016	17	11	0	6	64.71
Al-Shabab	(Saudi Arabia)	23 September 2017	8 March 2018	22	8	5	9	36.36
Al-Nassr	(Saudi Arabia)	14 April 2018	10 November 2018	11	8	1	2	72.73
Al-Wehda	(Saudi Arabia)	16 September 2019	19 August 2020	27	15	2	10	55.56
Montevideo Wanderers	(Uruguay)	12 October 2020	28 September 2022	98	37	27	34	37.76
Al-Hazem	(Saudi Arabia)	20 October 2023	19 April 2024	19	2	7	10	10.53
Al-Wehda	(Saudi Arabia)	27 November 2024	1 June 2025	23	7	3	13	30.43
Total				371	166	79	126	44.74

== Honours ==
=== Player ===
==== Club ====
Nacional

- Copa Libertadores (1): 1988
- Intercontinental Cup (1): 1988

=== Manager ===
==== Club ====
Montevideo Wanderers

- Uruguayan Segunda División (1): 2000
- Copa Libertadores Uruguayan liguilla (1): 2001

Nacional

- Uruguayan Primera División (1): 2002
- Copa Libertadores Uruguayan liguilla (1): 2007

Al-Nassr

- Saudi Professional League (1): 2013–14
- Saudi Crown Prince Cup (1): 2013–14
