= Doris Fuakumputu =

Congolese footballer

Doris Fuakuputu
Personal information
- Full name: Doris Salomo Fuakuputu
- Date of birth: 18 April 1984 (age 42)
- Place of birth: Kinshasa, Zaire
- Height: 1.75 m (5 ft 9 in)
- Position: Forward

Team information
- Current team: Al-Ahli Manama

Senior career*
Years	Team	Apps	(Gls)
2001–2003	AC Sodigraf	66	(47)
2003–2004	US Castelplanio Angeli	8	(8)
2004–2005	Cingolana	24	(20)
2005	Cesena	0	(0)
2005–2006	Jesina	16	(9)
2006–2007	Avezzano	20	(17)
2007–2008	Como	32	(16)
2008–2009	Neapolis	25	(3)
2009–2010	Civitanovese	30	(12)
2010–2015	Al-Fateh	127	(56)
2015–2016	Qadsia	13	(9)
2016	Al-Arabi	8	(2)
2016–2017	Al-Muharraq	?	(11)
2017–2018	Manama Club	?	(11)
2018–2019	Al-Ahli Manama	28	(12)

International career
2008	Congo DR	1	(0)
- * Club domestic league appearances and goals as of 12 February 2016

Doris Salomo Fuakuputu (born 18 April 1984) is a Congolese footballer who plays for Al-Ahli Manama in Bahrain.

He became the second player to play for both Kuwaiti giants.

== Honours ==
Al Fateh

- Saudi Premier League : 2012-13
- Saudi Super Cup : 2013
