= Wajdi Essid =

Tunisian football manager

Personal information
- Full name: Wajdi Essid
- Date of birth: October 25, 1960 (age 66)
- Place of birth: Tunisia

Managerial career
- Years: Team
- 1997–1998: Al-Wadea
- 2006: Sharjah
- 2008: Sharjah
- 2010: Al-Shamal
- 2012–2013: Al Wehda
- 2018–2019: MC El Eulma

Wajdi Essid is a Tunisian football manager.
