= Hamdan Al-Hamdan =

Saudi Arabian footballer

Personal information
- Full name: Hamdan Al-Hamdan
- Date of birth: 2 December 1984 (age 41)
- Place of birth: Al-Hasa, Saudi Arabia
- Height: 1.76 m (5 ft 9 1/2 in)
- Position: Midfielder

Youth career
- ????–2004: Al-Fateh

Senior career*
| Years | Team | Apps | (Gls) |
| 2004–2017 | Al-Fateh | 236 | (43) |
| 2018 | Al-Orobah | 8 | (0) |
| 2018–2019 | Al-Jabalain | 29 | (3) |
| 2020 | Al-Nojoom | 2 | (0) |

International career
| 2012–2013 | Saudi Arabia | 2 | (0) |
- * Club domestic league appearances and goals

Hamdan Al-Hamdan (Arabic: حمدان الحمدان; born 2 December 1984) is a Saudi professional footballer who plays as a midfielder.

He played for many years for Al-Fateh, with whom he won the 2012–13 Saudi Professional League title. Internationally, he has two senior appearances for the Saudi Arabia national team.

== Honours ==
Al-Fateh

- Saudi Professional League: 2012–13
- Saudi Super Cup: 2013
