= Mamadou Kondo =

Malian footballer

Mamoudou Kondo
Personal information
- Full name: Mamoudou Kondo
- Date of birth: November 30, 1989 (age 36)
- Place of birth: Mali
- Height: 1.85 m (6 ft 1 in)
- Position: Defender

Senior career*
Years	Team	Apps	(Gls)
2010–2012	Stade Malien	?	(?)
2013–2014	Al-Shoalah	6	(2)
- * Club domestic league appearances and goals

Mamoudou Kondo (born 30 November 1989) is a Malian footballer. He played for the Saudi Pro League side Al-Shoalah.

== Honours ==
Stade Malien

Première Division:

2011
