= Ahmad Al-Ajlani =

Tunisian footballer and manager

Ahmed Ajlani
Personal information
- Date of birth: 30 November 1960 (age 65)
- Place of birth: Tunisia

Managerial career
- Years: Team
- 1990–1995: Étoile du Sahel
- 1997–1999: Khaleej
- 1999–2000: Al-Orobah
- 2000–2001: Al-Shoulla
- 2001–2003: Al-Qadsiah
- 2003–2004: Al-Tai
- 2004: Al Hilal
- 2004–2005: Al Qadsiah
- 2005–2006: Al-Hazem
- 2006: Al-Shabab
- 2006: Al-Hazem
- 2006–2007: Emirates
- 2009–2010: Emirates
- 2010: Al-Shaab
- 2011: Al-Shaab
- 2013–2014: Al-Shoulla
- 2015–2016: OC Khouribga
- 2016–2018: Al Kharaitiyat SC
- 2018–2019: IR Tanger
- 2019: Al-Shoulla
- 2019–2020: OC Khouribga
- 2022–2023: Al-Jabalain
- 2024: Étoile du Sahel

Ahmed Ajlani (Arabic: أحمد العجلاني; born 30 November 1960) is a Tunisian former footballer and current head coach of Étoile sportive du Sahel.

== Career ==
Ajlani played in Tunisia for his home club Étoile du Sahel. He began his coaching career at Étoile du Sahel before passing through many teams in Saudi Arabia, United Arab Emirates, Qatar and Morocco. He reached some achievements before returning to his home club, Étoile du Sahel, in February 2024.

== Achievements ==
- Moroccan League:
  - Runners-up : 2014–15
- Moroccan Cup:
  - Winners : 2015
- Saudi First Division:
  - Winners : 2001–02
  - Runners-up : 2000–01
