= Waheed Oseni =

Nigerian footballer

Personal information
- Full name: Waheed Akanni Oseni
- Date of birth: 17 January 1988 (age 38)
- Place of birth: Cyprus
- Height: 1.83 m (6 ft 0 in)
- Position: Centre back

Youth career
- 2005–2006: Sunshine Stars
- 2006–2007: Beitar Jerusalem

Senior career*
Years	Team	Apps	(Gls)
2008–2012	Apollon Limassol	120	(12)
2012–2013	Ethnikos Achna	36	(5)
2013–2014	Al-Taawon	38	(3)
2013–2014	Najran	26	(2)
2015–2016	Dohuk FC	10	(0)
2016–2017	Al-Orouba SC	13	(1)
2018	UKM FC	34	(1)
- * Club domestic league appearances and goals as of 13 July 2018

Waheed Akanni Oseni (born 17 January 1988) is a Nigerian footballer who plays as a centre back or defensive midfielder.

== Club career ==
He started his career in Nigeria, at Sunshine Stars and in 2006 moved to Beitar Jerusalem. In January 2008 he transferred to Apollon Limassol, where he signed a contract for an initial of 6 months, extended to three years to 30 June 2012. He then moved to Saudi Professional League club Al-Taawon.
