= Beñat San José =

Spanish footballer and manager

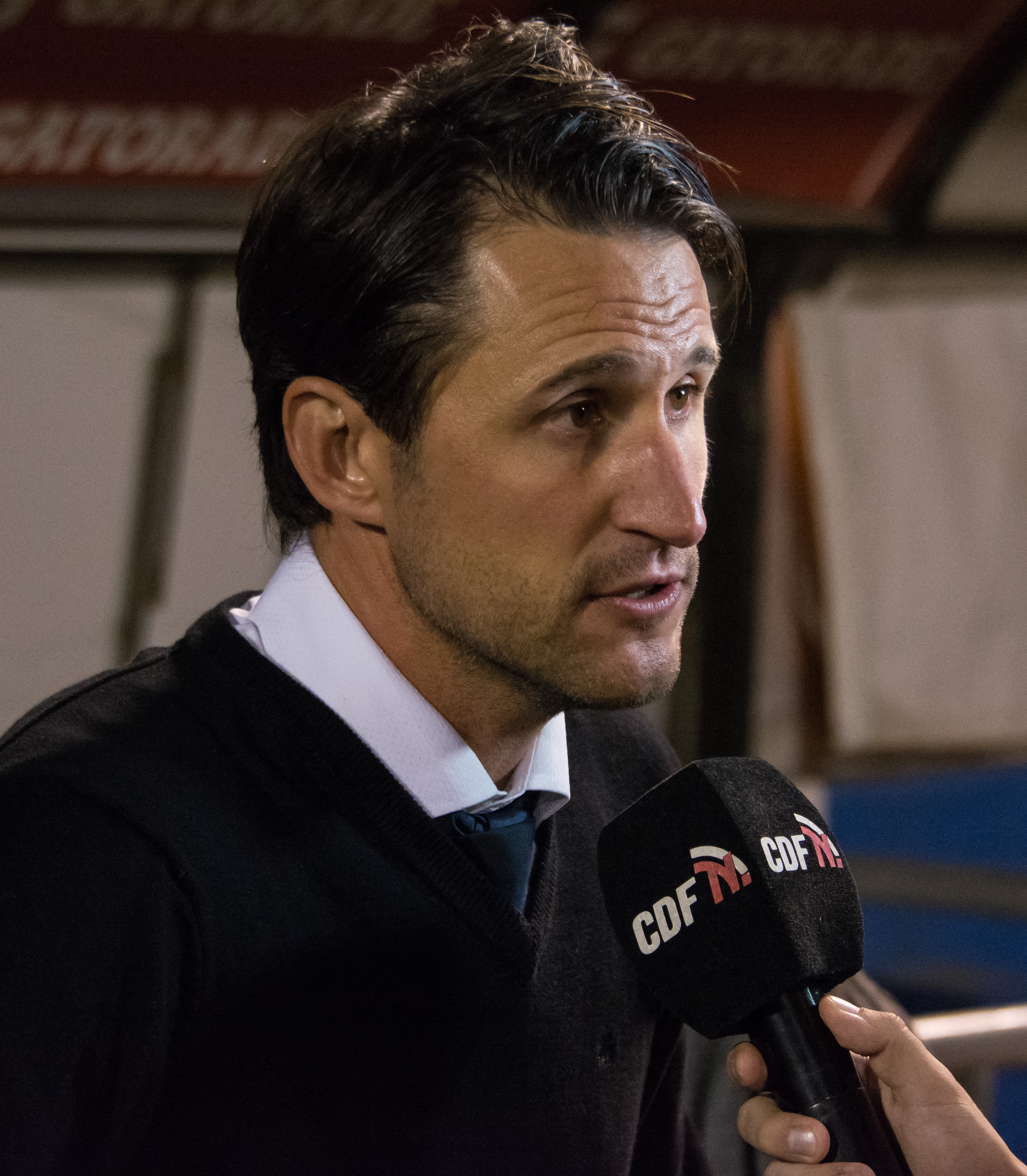
- San José as manager of Universidad Católica in 2018

Personal information
- Full name: Beñat San José Gil
- Date of birth: 24 September 1979 (age 47)
- Place of birth: San Sebastián, Spain
- Height: 1.80 m (5 ft 11 in)
- Position: Winger

Team information
- Current team: Rayo Vallecano (manager)

Youth career
- Real Sociedad
- Antiguoko

Senior career*
Years	Team	Apps	(Gls)
- Hernani
- UPV
- Tolosa
- Basconia
–2002	Berio		
2002	Orihuela	0	(0)
2002–2003	Beniel		
- Saint-Jean de Luz
- Pasaia

Managerial career
- Ekintza Ikastola
- Antiguoko
- 2008–2012: Real Sociedad (youth)
- 2012–2013: Al-Ittihad U21
- 2013–2014: Al-Ittihad
- 2014–2015: Al-Ettifaq
- 2015–2016: Deportes Antofagasta
- 2016–2017: Bolívar
- 2018: Universidad Católica
- 2018–2019: Al-Nasr
- 2019–2021: Eupen
- 2021–2022: Mazatlán
- 2022–2023: Bolívar
- 2023–2024: Atlas
- 2025–2026: Eibar
- 2026–: Rayo Vallecano
- * Club domestic league appearances and goals

Beñat San José Gil (born 24 September 1979), is a Spanish association football manager and former footballer who played as a left winger, who is currently in charge of Rayo Vallecano.

He is the youngest manager in Gulf and Saudi history to have won a title, the 2013 Saudi Kings Cup at the age of 33 with Al-Ittihad.

== Playing career ==
Born in San Sebastián, Gipuzkoa, Basque Country, San José represented Real Sociedad and Antiguoko as a youth. As a senior, he represented Hernani, Universidad del País Vasco, Tolosa, Basconia, Berio, Orihuela, Saint-Jean de Luz Foot and Pasaia, aside from more than a year representing the Spain national beach soccer team.

== Managerial career ==
San José started his coaching career with Ekintza Ikastola, and joined Real Sociedad's youth teams in 2008, from Antiguoko. In August 2012, he moved abroad, being named manager of the under-21 team of Al-Ittihad.

In February 2013, San José replaced compatriot Raúl Caneda at the helm of the first team, and finished the campaign in seventh; at the Kings Cup he led the club to the eight cup title of their history, and at the age of 33, he became the youngest manager to lift a trophy in Saudi Arabia. On 1 December, however, he was sacked.

In July 2014, San José was named Al-Ettifaq manager in the place of Ioan Andone, but was sacked the following 17 February. On 17 September 2015, he took over Deportes Antofagasta in Chile, replacing resigned José Cantillana.

On 22 May 2016, San José switched teams and countries again, after being appointed manager of Bolívar. On 20 December of the following year, he resigned, and was announced as Universidad Católica manager the following day.

On 10 December 2018, after lifting the year's Primera División trophy, San José left the UC, and joined Al-Nasr five days later. He was sacked the following 1 April, after a string of poor results.

On 24 June 2019, San José returned to Europe after being named manager of Belgian club Eupen. On 27 April 2021, he left the club after opting to not renew his contract.

On 18 May 2021, San José was appointed as manager of Liga MX club Mazatlán. He was dismissed the following 2 March, with the club in the 14th position.

On 12 November 2022, San José agreed to return to Bolívar, replacing Antônio Carlos Zago. He resigned on 19 November 2023 after being touted to return to Mexico, five days later, Atlas announced him as manager for the 2024 Clausura.

On 17 February 2025, San José returned to his home country after being named manager of Segunda División side Eibar, replacing the sacked Joseba Etxeberria. On 18 June of the following year, he left after accepting an offer from another club, and was announced at La Liga side Rayo Vallecano just hours later.

== Managerial statistics ==
As of match played 21 November 2026

Managerial record by team and tenure
Team	Nat	From	To	Record								Ref
Team	Nat	From	To	G	W	D	L	GF	GA	GD	Win %	Ref
Al-Ittihad	(Saudi Arabia)	23 February 2013	8 December 2013	24	10	4	10	45	42	+3	41.67	
Al-Ettifaq	(Saudi Arabia)	1 May 2014	17 February 2015	25	13	5	7	42	24	+18	52.00	
Deportes Antofagasta	(Chile)	17 September 2015	20 May 2016	24	6	8	10	32	32	+0	25.00	
Bolívar	(Bolivia)	21 May 2016	20 December 2017	75	46	13	16	148	72	+76	61.33	
Universidad Católica	(Chile)	21 December 2017	10 December 2018	32	18	10	4	41	28	+13	56.25	
Al-Nasr	(United Arab Emirates)	15 December 2018	30 March 2019	10	0	3	7	11	18	−7	0.00	
Eupen	(Belgium)	24 June 2019	29 April 2021	69	21	20	28	89	113	−24	30.43	
Mazatlán	(Mexico)	18 May 2021	2 March 2022	25	7	6	12	27	39	−12	28.00	
Bolívar	(Bolivia)	12 November 2022	19 November 2023	49	28	6	15	110	57	+53	57.14	
Atlas	(Mexico)	1 January 2024	9 December 2024	39	10	12	17	43	62	−19	25.64	
Eibar	(Spain)	17 February 2025	18 June 2026	60	27	17	16	79	55	+24	45.00	
Rayo Vallecano	(Spain)	18 June 2026	Present	13	4	3	6	18	24	−6	30.77	
Total				445	193	104	148	685	566	+119	43.37	—

== Honours ==
=== Manager ===
Al-Ittihad

- King Cup of Champions: 2013

Bolívar

- Bolivian Primera División: 2017 Apertura, 2017 Clausura

Universidad Católica

- Chilean Primera División: 2018
