= Taoufik Rouabah =

Algerian football manager (born 1970)

Personal information
- Full name: Taoufik Rouabah
- Date of birth: May 6, 1970 (age 56)
- Place of birth: Algeria

Managerial career
- Years: Team
- 2010–2012: MC Saïda
- 2012: CA Batna
- 2012: CA Bordj Bou Arréridj
- 2012–2013: CA Batna
- 2013–2014: Al Taawon
- 2014: Ettifaq FC
- 2016: CA Batna
- 2017: Al-Raed FC
- 2018–2019: Olympique de Médéa

Taoufik Rouabah (born 6 May 1970) is an Algerian football manager who most recently was in charge of Olympique de Médéa.
