= Al Wehda FC =

Association football club in Saudi Arabia

- Full name: Al Wehda Saudi Football Club
- Nicknames: Fursan Mecca (Knights of Mecca); Al-Mared Al-Ahmar (The Red Giants)
- Founded: 1 January 1916; 110 years ago as Al Mukhtalat Football Club
- Ground: King Abdulaziz Sports City Stadium
- Capacity: 38,000
- Owner: Ministry of Sport
- President: Sultan Azhar
- Head coach: Rusmir Cviko
- League: First Division League
- 2025–26: First Division League, 10th of 18
- Website: alwehdaclub.sa
| Home colours | Away colours | Third colours |

Al Wehda Football Club (Arabic: نادي الوحدة لكرة القدم) is a Saudi Arabian professional football club based in Mecca, Saudi Arabia, that competes in the Saudi First Division League, the second tier of the Saudi football league system.

== History ==
=== Early years (1916–1945) ===
Al Wehda traces its origins to 1916, when it was established as Al Mukhtalat Club in the Hejaz Vilayet of the Ottoman Empire. The name Al Mukhtalat, meaning “inclusive” or “mixed,” reflected the club’s diverse composition, as it included both Saudi and non-Saudi players.

In 1945, the club briefly adopted the name Al Hizb (The Party) before being renamed Al Wehda (Unity). The change was made to commemorate the unification of Saudi Arabia under King Ibn Saud during World War I.

=== Domestic success (1950s–1960s) ===
Al Wehda won the 1957–58 edition of His Majesty's League, the predecessor to the modern Saudi Pro League, becoming the inaugural champions of Saudi Arabia’s top-flight football league.

In 1959–60, the club won the Crown Prince Cup. In 1966, it went on to win the King Cup, becoming the first team to lift the competition.

== Honours ==
| Type | Competition | Titles | Seasons |
|---|---|---|---|
| Domestic | His Majesty's League/Saudi Pro League | 1 | 1957–58 |
| Domestic | Saudi First Division League | 4^{s} | 1982–83, 1995–96, 2002–03, 2017–18 |
| Domestic | King's Cup | 1 | 1966 |
| Domestic | Crown Prince's Cup | 1 | 1959–60 |

- record
- ^{s} shared record

== International record ==
=== Overview ===
As of 20 May 2021

| Competition | Pld | W | D | L | GF | GA |
|---|---|---|---|---|---|---|
| AFC Champions League Elite | 1 | 0 | 1 | 0 | 1 | 1 |
| Arab Club Champions Cup | 6 | 3 | 1 | 2 | 24 | 8 |
| TOTAL | 7 | 3 | 2 | 2 | 25 | 9 |

=== Record by country ===
| Country | Pld | W | D | L | GF | GA | GD | Win% |
|---|---|---|---|---|---|---|---|---|
| Algeria | 4 | 1 | 1 | 2 | 5 | 8 | −3 | 25.00 |
| Djibouti | 2 | 2 | 0 | 0 | 19 | 0 | +19 | 100.00 |
| Iraq | 1 | 0 | 1 | 0 | 1 | 1 | +0 | 0.00 |
| TOTAL | 7 | 3 | 2 | 2 | 25 | 9 | +16 | 42.86 |

=== International record ===
==== Matches ====
| Season | Competition | Round | Club | Home | Away | Aggregate |
|---|---|---|---|---|---|---|
| 2007–08 | Arab Champions League | R32 | (Djibouti) CDE-Colas | 11–0 | 8−0 | 19–0 |
| 2007–08 | Arab Champions League | R16 | (Algeria) ES Sétif | 1–1 | 1−3 | 2–4 |
| 2008–09 | Arab Champions League | R32 | (Algeria) USM Alger | 3–1 | 0−3 | 3–4 |
| 2021 | AFC Champions League | PO | (Iraq) Al-Quwa Al-Jawiya | 1–1 (2–3 p) | | 1–1 (2–3 p) |

== Current squad ==
As of 1 August 2025

Note: Flags indicate national team as defined under FIFA eligibility rules; some limited exceptions apply. Players may hold more than one non-FIFA nationality.

| No. | Pos. | Nation | Player |
|---|---|---|---|
| 1 | GK | KSA | Abdullah Al-Owaishir |
| 2 | DF | KSA | Saeed Al-Muwallad |
| 3 | DF | KSA | Hani Al-Sebyani |
| 5 | DF | ALG | Farouk Chafaï |
| 6 | DF | KSA | Rawaf Al-Moqaadi |
| 7 | DF | KSA | Adil Khadhari |
| 12 | MF | KSA | Abdulaziz Makin |
| 13 | DF | KSA | Mohammed Al-Sufyani |
| 14 | DF | KSA | Abdulmohsen Fallatah |
| 15 | DF | KSA | Hattan Asiri |
| 16 | MF | KSA | Nawaf Al-Azizi |
| 17 | FW | KSA | Sattam Al-Lehiyani |
| 18 | MF | KSA | Mohammed Al-Qunayan |
| 20 | MF | KSA | Khalid Majrashi |
| 23 | MF | KSA | Abdulaziz Majrashi |
| 24 | MF | KSA | Salem Al-Moqaadi |
| 29 | MF | KSA | Fahad Al-Taleb |
| 30 | MF | EGY | Hazem Ismail |
| 32 | DF | KSA | Masoud Bakheet |
| 33 | DF | KSA | Rakan Al-Harbi |

| No. | Pos. | Nation | Player |
|---|---|---|---|
| 44 | GK | KSA | Abdulrahman Al-Shammari |
| 47 | GK | KSA | Ahmed Al-Rashidi |
| 49 | DF | KSA | Ali Al-Salem |
| 55 | DF | KSA | Saad Al-Qahtani |
| 60 | GK | KSA | Khaled Al-Sherif |
| 77 | FW | KSA | Murad Khadhari |
| 79 | MF | KSA | Salman Al-Moasher |
| 80 | DF | KSA | Yasser Al-Mousa |
| 87 | DF | KSA | Ridha Amidou |
| 88 | GK | KSA | Sultan Al-Harbi |
| 99 | FW | KSA | Saif Al-Omari |
| — | DF | KSA | Bandar Whaeshi |
| — | DF | KSA | Yahya Kharmi |
| — | DF | KSA | Bandar Darwish |
| — | MF | KSA | Ahmed Al-Juwaid |
| — | MF | BRA | Muralha |
| — | MF | CRO | Dino Halilović |
| — | MF | BRA | Morato |
| — | MF | VEN | Darwin González |

== Coaching staff ==
| Position | Name |
|---|---|
| Head coach | (Bosnia and Herzegovina) Rusmir Cviko |
| Assistant coach | (Bosnia and Herzegovina) Bakir Serbo (Egypt) Mahmoud Abbas (Saudi Arabia) Osama Barnawi |
| Goalkeeper coach | (Bosnia and Herzegovina) Elvis Karic |
| Chief analyst | (Saudi Arabia) Saad Al-Dossari |
| Doctor | (Saudi Arabia) Fahad Al-Menhali |
| Physiotherapist | (Saudi Arabia) Mohammed Al-Shalwi |
| Sports scientist | (Kosovo) Rustem Gashi |
| Director of football | (Saudi Arabia) Yassin Al-Zahrani |
| Technical director | (Saudi Arabia) Hazim Al-Freej |

== Managerial history ==
- (Saudi Arabia) Hassan Sultan (1955–1957)
- (Saudi Arabia) Hassan Sultan
- (Egypt) Raafat Attia (1974–1975)
- (Tunisia) Redha Al Sayeh (1976–1977)
- (Egypt) Taha Ismail (1981–1983)
- (Tunisia) Abdelmajid Chetali (1983–1985)
- (Saudi Arabia) Khaled Al-Jizani (1985)
- (Egypt) Mahmoud Abou-Regaila (1985–1986)
- (Brazil) Jairzinho (1988–1989)
- (Egypt) Mimi Abdelhamid (1989–1990)
- (France) Pavle Dolezar (1995)
- (France) Jean Fernandez (1997)
- (Brazil) Gaúcho (1998–1999)
- (Romania) Eugen Moldovan (1999–2000)
- (Saudi Arabia) Khaled Al-Jizani (caretaker) (November 10, 1999 – November 27, 1999)
- (England) David Roberts (November 27, 1999 – May 30, 2000)
- (Romania) Dumitru Marcu (July 13, 2000 – March 2, 2001)
- (Tunisia) Adel Latrach (March 2, 2001 – May 30, 2001)
- (Brazil) Vantuir (July 5, 2001 – January 14, 2002)
- (Brazil) Luis Carlos (January 14, 2002 – May 1, 2002)
- (Serbia and Montenegro) Zoran Đorđević (August 1, 2002 – October 23, 2002)
- (Saudi Arabia) Khalid Al-Koroni (October 23, 2002 – June 1, 2004)
- (Tunisia) Lotfi Benzarti (July 1, 2004 – June 30, 2006)
- (Germany) Theo Bücker (July 6, 2006 – May 31, 2007)
- (Netherlands) Jan Versleijen (June 2, 2007 – February 19, 2008)
- (Saudi Arabia) Khalid Al-Koroni (February 19, 2008 – May 1, 2008)
- (Germany) Theo Bücker (July 1, 2008 – June 30, 2009)
- (Portugal) Eurico Gomes (August 13, 2009 – June 30, 2010)
- (France) Jean-Christian Lang (July 1, 2010 – December 23, 2010)
- (Egypt) Mokhtar Mokhtar (December 25, 2010 – May 8, 2011)
- (Tunisia) Lotfi Benzarti (May 8, 2011 – May 25, 2011)
- (Egypt) Bashir Abdel Samad (May 26, 2011 – June 30, 2011)
- (Serbia) Dragan Cvetković (August 21, 2011 – November 24, 2011)
- (Tunisia) Adel Latrach (November 26, 2011 – February 16, 2012)
- (Egypt) Bashir Abdel Samad (February 17, 2012 – August 30, 2012)
- (Tunisia) Wajdi Essid (September 15, 2012 – January 26, 2013)
- (Tunisia) Khalil Obaid (January 26, 2013 – April 27, 2013)
- (Romania) Florin Cioroianu (July 21, 2013 – October 1, 2013)
- (Egypt) Mohamed Salah (October 1, 2013 – March 1, 2014)
- (Tunisia) Abderrazek Chebbi (March 1, 2014 – April 5, 2014)
- (Algeria) Djamel Menad (June 7, 2014 – September 20, 2014)
- (Saudi Arabia) Khalid Al-Koroni (September 22, 2014 – October 28, 2014)
- (Uruguay) Juan Rodríguez (November 17, 2014 – October 30, 2015)
- (Algeria) Kheïreddine Madoui (November 9, 2015 – December 9, 2016)
- (Egypt) Adel Abdel Rahman (December 11, 2016 – May 5, 2017)
- (Tunisia) Jameel Qassem (July 1, 2017 – May 5, 2018)
- (Brazil) Fábio Carille (May 22, 2018 – December 13, 2018)
- (Egypt) Mido (December 17, 2018 – March 19, 2019)
- (Argentina) Juan Brown (March 20, 2019 – May 17, 2019)
- (Croatia) Mario Cvitanović (July 2, 2019 – September 16, 2019)
- (Uruguay) José Daniel Carreño (September 16, 2019 – August 19, 2020)
- (Saudi Arabia) Essa Al-Mehyani (caretaker) (August 19, 2020 – September 9, 2020)
- (Portugal) Ivo Vieira (September 10, 2020 – February 2, 2021)
- (Jordan) Mahmoud Al-Hadid (February 2, 2021 – March 21, 2021)
- (Greece) Georgios Donis (March 23, 2021 – May 31, 2021)
- (Tunisia) Habib Ben Romdhane (July 26, 2021 – June 1, 2022)
- (Bosnia and Herzegovina) Bruno Akrapović (June 16, 2022 – October 20, 2022)
- (Chile) José Luis Sierra (October 20, 2022 – June 1, 2023)
- (Greece) Georgios Donis (July 11, 2023 – June 1, 2024)
- (Germany) Josef Zinnbauer (July 24, 2024 – November 15, 2024)
- (Egypt) Mahmoud Abbas (caretaker) (November 15, 2024 – November 27, 2024)
- (Uruguay) José Daniel Carreño (November 27, 2024 – June 1, 2025)
- (Chile) José Luis Sierra (September 1, 2025 – November 2, 2025)
- (Egypt) Mahmoud Abbas (caretaker) (November 2, 2025 – December 15, 2025)
- (Bosnia and Herzegovina) Rusmir Cviko (December 15, 2025 – present)

== See also ==
- List of football clubs in Saudi Arabia
