= Saudi Super Cup =

Saudi Super Cup كأس السوبر السعودي
- Organiser(s): Saudi Arabian Football Federation
- Founded: 2013; 13 years ago
- Region: Saudi Arabia
- Teams: 4
- Current champions: Al-Ahli (2nd title)
- Most championships: Al-Hilal (5 titles)
- Broadcaster: Thmanyah
- Website: saff.com
- 2026 Saudi Super Cup

The Saudi Super Cup is an annual super cup competition in Saudi Arabian football. Established in 2013 as a match between two teams, the format was expanded in 2022 to include four teams: the winners and runners-up of both the Saudi Pro League and the King's Cup.

== History ==
The idea of having a super cup tournament in Saudi Arabia dates back to 1979 when a two-legged match was held between the 1978–79 Saudi Premier League winners, Al-Hilal, and the 1979 King Cup winners, Al-Ahli. The first leg, which was played in Jeddah, ended in 2–2 draw and the second leg, held in Riyadh, ended in a 4–1 win for Al-Hilal. 20 years later, another super cup match between Al-Hilal, the 1997–98 Saudi Premier League winners, and Al-Ahli, the 1997–98 Saudi Crown Prince Cup winners, was held. It was the opening match for the inaugural Saudi Founder's Cup and ended in a 5–2 win for Al-Hilal.

In 2012, Saudi Arabian Football Federation officially decided to launch the tournament following the conclusion of the 2011–12 season. The planned super cup match was set to be held between the 2011–12 Saudi Pro League winners, Al-Shabab and the 2012 King Cup of Champions winners, Al-Ahli. However, the 2012 Super Cup was canceled due to scheduling issues as no appropriate date for the match was found. The tournament was officially inaugurated in 2013 and was played by the 2012–13 Saudi Pro League winners, Al-Fateh, and 2013 King Cup of Champions winners, Al-Ittihad. Al-Fateh won the first official edition of the Saudi Super Cup after beating Al-Ittihad 3–2 after extra time. The 2014 Saudi Super Cup was the first edition to be held in Riyadh. Al-Shabab defeated Al-Nassr 4–3 on penalties in the King Fahd International Stadium. In 2015, the Super Cup was played outside of Saudi Arabia for the first time. The match was between 2014–15 Saudi Pro League winners, Al-Nassr, and 2015 King Cup winners, Al-Hilal. The match was held in Loftus Road in London and ended in 1–0 win for Al-Hilal. The next two editions were also held in London, with the 2016 edition held in Craven Cottage and the 2018 edition held once again in Loftus Road. In 2016, Al-Ahli defeated Al-Hilal 4–3 on penalties. The 2017 edition which was supposed to be contested between Al-Hilal and Al-Ittihad was the first edition to be canceled. The decision was based on the request of then-Saudi national team manager, Edgardo Bauza, who expressed his desire to change the calendar of the season to help him set the ideal preparation program for the 2018 FIFA World Cup. In 2018, the tournament returned following a years absence. Al-Hilal defeated Al-Ittihad 2–1 to become the first team to win the trophy twice. In 2019, the Saudi Super Cup was held in Jeddah for the first time. Al-Nassr defeated Al-Taawoun 5–4 on penalties in the King Abdullah Stadium to win their first title.

On 12 January 2021, the Saudi Arabian Football Federation (SAFF) and Saudi water company "Berain" signed a sponsorship deal for the 2020 edition. The match would officially be referred to as "The Berain Saudi Super Cup". On 30 January 2021, Al-Nassr defeated Al-Hilal 3–0 to win their second title. They became the first team to win two consecutive titles and also set the record for the biggest goal margin. On 6 January 2022, Al-Hilal defeated Al-Faisaly, who were making their debut in the competition, 4–3 on penalties to become the most successful team in the competition with three titles.

On 19 February 2022, the SAFF announced that the Saudi Super Cup would expand to four teams with the winners and runners-up of the Saudi Pro League and the King's Cup taking part.

== Sponsorship ==
- No Sponsorship (2013–2019)
- Berain Super cup (2020–2022)
- Diriyah Super cup (2023–2024)

== Competition rules ==
- League champions and runners up versus King's Cup winners and runners up.
- The match consists of two periods of 45 minutes each, known as halves. If the scores are level at the end of 90 minutes, a penalty shoot-out determines the winner.

== Editions ==
=== Finals ===
Year	Winners	Runners-up	Result	Date	Venue	Attendance
2013	Al-Fateh	Al-Ittihad	3–2 (a.e.t.)	17/08/2013	(Saudi Arabia) King Abdulaziz Stadium, Mecca	29,376
2014	Al-Shabab	Al-Nassr	1–1 (4–3 p)	07/08/2014	(Saudi Arabia) King Fahd International Stadium, Riyadh	31,000
2015	Al-Hilal	Al-Nassr	1–0	12/08/2015	(England) Loftus Road, London	8,439
2016	Al-Ahli	Al-Hilal	1–1 (4–3 p)	08/08/2016	(England) Craven Cottage, London	16,365
2017	Not played					
2018	Al-Hilal	Al-Ittihad	2–1	18/08/2018	(England) Loftus Road, London	16,300
2019	Al-Nassr	Al-Taawoun	1–1 (5–4 p)	04/01/2020	(Saudi Arabia) King Abdullah Stadium, Jeddah	40,514
2020	Al-Nassr	Al-Hilal	3–0	30/01/2021	(Saudi Arabia) King Fahd International Stadium, Riyadh	0 (Note: Match held behind closed doors due to the COVID-19 pandemic.)
2021	Al-Hilal	Al-Faisaly	2–2 (4–3 p)	06/01/2022	(Saudi Arabia) Prince Faisal bin Fahd Stadium, Riyadh	6,164
Format changed to 4-team competition from 2022 onwards
2022	Al-Ittihad	Al-Fayha	2–0	29/01/2023	(Saudi Arabia) King Fahd International Stadium, Riyadh	47,518
2023	Al-Hilal	Al-Ittihad	4–1	11/04/2023	(United Arab Emirates) Mohammed bin Zayed Stadium, Abu Dhabi	27,250
2024	Al-Hilal	Al-Nassr	4–1	17/08/2024	(Saudi Arabia) Prince Sultan bin Abdulaziz Sports City Stadium, Abha	14,357
2025	Al-Ahli	Al-Nassr	2–2 (5–3 p)	23/08/2025	Hong Kong Stadium, Hong Kong	30,240
2026				23/12/2026	Jaber Al-Ahmad International Stadium, Kuwait City	

== Statistics ==
=== Performance by club ===
Club	Winners	Runners-up	Semi-finalists	Years won	Years runner-up	Years semi-finalist
Al-Hilal	5	2	1	2015, 2018, 2021, 2023, 2024	2016, 2020	2022
Al-Nassr	2	4	2	2019, 2020	2014, 2015, 2024, 2025	2022, 2023
Al-Ahli	2	–	1	2016, 2025		2024
Al-Ittihad	1	3	1	2022	2013, 2018, 2023	2025
Al-Fateh	1	–	–	2013		
Al-Shabab	1	–	–	2014		
Al-Taawoun	–	1	1		2019	2024
Al-Faisaly	–	1	–		2021	
Al-Fayha	–	1	–		2022	
Al-Wehda	–	–	1			2023
Al-Qadsiah	–	–	1			2025

=== Performance by representative ===
	Winners	Runners-up	Semi-finalists
Pro League champions	6	4	2
King's Cup champions	3	5	–
Pro League runners-up	2	1	1
Pro League fifth place	1	–	–
Pro League third place	–	1	2
Crown Prince's Cup champions	–	1	–
King's Cup runners-up	–	–	2
Pro League fourth place	–	–	1

== Top goalscorers ==
As of the 2025 edition

- **Bold** indicates active players in Saudi football.

Player	Club(s)	Goals	Apps
(Morocco) **Abderrazak Hamdallah**	Al-Nassr, Al-Ittihad	7	6
(Brazil) **Malcom**	Al-Hilal	4	3
(Serbia) Aleksandar Mitrović	Al-Hilal	3	2
(Ivory Coast) **Franck Kessié**	Al-Ahli	3	3
(Portugal) **Cristiano Ronaldo**	Al-Nassr	3	6
(Saudi Arabia) **Salem Al-Dawsari**	Al-Hilal	3	9

== See also ==
- Saudi Arabian Football Federation
- Saudi Pro League
- King's Cup
