= Al Fateh SC =

Association football club in Saudi Arabia

Al-Fateh
- Full name: Al-Fateh Sports Club
- Nicknames: Al Namothji (The Role Model); Abna Al Nakhil (Sons of the Palm)
- Founded: 1958; 68 years ago
- Ground: Al-Fateh Stadium
- Capacity: 11,851
- Chairman: Mansour Al-Afaliq
- Head coach: Jamal Sellami
- League: Saudi Pro League
- 2025–26: Pro League, 11th of 18
- Website: fatehclub.com
Home colours	Away colours

Al Fateh active departments
Football (men's)	Basketball (men's)

Al-Fateh Sports Club (Arabic: نادي الفتح الرياضي, romanized: nādī al-fataḥ ar-riyāḍiyy) is a Saudi Arabian multi-sports club based in Al-Mubarraz, Al-Ahsa. It is mainly known for its professional football club. The club derives its nickname from the fact that almost all of its sections play in the national top flights.

== History ==
Al Fateh have played in the lower divisions for most of their existence, unlike rivals and city neighbours Hajer FC who played in the top flight when they achieved promotions in the 80's, 90's and 2000's. Al Fateh hired Tunisian head coach Fathi Al-Jabal in the middle of the 2007-08 Saudi First Division League, in the 2008–09 season Al-Jabal finished as runners-up to guide Al Fateh to their first ever promotion to the Saudi Professional League. The club managed to stay up in the Saudi Professional League in their first ever top flight season. In the following two seasons the club set out to build a formidable squad, with Al Fateh already possessing talented home grown players such as Hamdan Al-Hamdan and Mohammed Al-Fuhaid, they also acquired the services of Congolese forward Doris Fuakumputu and former Al-Nassr Attacking midfielder Élton.

=== Saudi League Champions (2012–2013) ===
Al Fateh pulled off a surprise when on 14 April 2013, they won their first League title, with 2 games to spare, following a 1–0 home win over Al-Ahli. Al Fateh became the seventh club to win the Pro League. This is considered by many to be one of the greatest shocks in Saudi football history, especially considering that Al Fateh were promoted to the Pro League for the first time only four years earlier. This was the first time a club outside the Riyadh and Jeddah clubs to win the Saudi Professional League since the 1986–87 season. Élton won the Player of the Season award by scoring 11 goals and bagging 10 assists, as well as Doris Fuakumputu scoring 17 goals to lead Al Fateh to the title.

Later, they played in the inaugural edition of the Saudi Super Cup to face Al-Ittihad, after 90 minutes the score was a 2–2 draw and the game went into extra time. Élton scored the winning goal of the game in the 111th minute, Al Fateh defeated Al-Ittihad 3–2 after extra time to become the inaugural champions of the Saudi Super Cup.

Al Fateh advanced to the 2014 AFC Champions League group stage in their debut campaign as 2012–13 Saudi Professional League champions, but crashed out of the group stage with a (2D,4L) record and without winning a single match. Al Fateh qualified again to the 2017 AFC Champions League due to Al-Ittihad, the 2015–16 Saudi Professional League 3rd place, could not participate in the AFC Champions League because of club licensing requirements problems. As a result, Al-Taawoun, the league 4th place, entered the group stage instead of the qualifying play-offs, while Al Fateh, the league 5th place, entered the qualifying play-offs. Al Fateh defeated Nasaf Qarshi 1–0 in the Qualifying play-offs to advance to the group stage (Group B).

== Honours ==
- Saudi Pro League (tier 1)
  - Winners (1): 2012–13
- Saudi First Division League (tier 2)
  - Runners-up (1): 2008–09
- Saudi Second Division League (tier 3)
  - Winners (3): 1982–83, 1996–97, 1998–99
  - Runners-up (1): 2002–03
- Saudi Super Cup
  - Winners (1): 2013

== Players ==
As of 9 September 2025

Note: Flags indicate national team as defined under FIFA eligibility rules; some limited exceptions apply. Players may hold more than one non-FIFA nationality.

No.	Pos.	Nation	Player
1	GK	CRO	Adrian Šemper
3	DF	TOG	Kennedy Boateng
4	DF	KSA	Ziyad Al-Jari
5	DF	KSA	Faisal Darisi
6	MF	KSA	Ali Al-Hassan
7	FW	KSA	Fahad Al-Zubaidi
8	MF	ROU	Mihai Lixandru
9	FW	CIV	Wilfried Kanga
10	MF	SVK	Lukáš Haraslín
11	FW	MAR	Mourad Batna
16	DF	KSA	Abdulelah Al-Khaibari (on loan from Al-Ahli)
17	DF	MAR	Marwane Saâdane (captain)
18	MF	KSA	Abdulaziz Al-Fawaz
19	DF	NED	Robin Kelder
20	MF	MAR	Houssam Essadak (on loan from UTS)
21	FW	CPV	Jefferson Ramos
22	DF	KSA	Abdulrahman Al-Khaibari

No.	Pos.	Nation	Player
23	FW	BRA	Sorriso (on loan from Palmeiras)
24	MF	KSA	Mehdi Al-Aboud
25	MF	KSA	Mohammed Al-Sahaihi
27	DF	SDN	Ali Alamine
28	MF	COM	Zaydou Youssouf
29	FW	KSA	Ali Al-Masoud
31	GK	KSA	Habib Al-Wotayan
34	GK	KSA	Mahmoud Al-Burayh
38	GK	KSA	Ibrahim Al-Aboud
49	FW	KSA	Saad Al-Sharfa
63	DF	KSA	Montadhar Al-Shaqaq
78	DF	KSA	Abdulaziz Al-Suwailem
80	MF	KSA	Faisal Al-Abdulwahed
87	DF	KSA	Sattam Al-Tumbukti
88	MF	KSA	Othman Al-Othman
94	GK	KSA	Waleed Al-Enezi

=== Out on loan ===
Note: Flags indicate national team as defined under FIFA eligibility rules; some limited exceptions apply. Players may hold more than one non-FIFA nationality.

No.	Pos.	Nation	Player
12	DF	KSA	Hussain Qassem (at Al-Riyadh)
13	GK	KSA	Abdulhadi Al-Alwan (at Al-Nassr)

No.	Pos.	Nation	Player
55	DF	KSA	Fawaz Al-Hamad (at Al-Jeel)

== International competitions ==
=== Overview ===
As of 13 August 2019

Competition	Pld	W	D	L	GF	GA
AFC Champions League Elite	13	2	5	6	11	20
Arab Club Champions Cup	4	2	1	1	7	6
TOTAL	17	4	6	7	18	26

=== International record ===
==== Matches ====
Season	Competition	Round	Club	Home	Away	Aggregate
2012–13	Arab Club Champions Cup	1R	(Kuwait) Al-Jahra	1–0	2–1	3–1
2012–13	Arab Club Champions Cup	2R	(Kuwait) Al-Arabi	2–2	2–3	4–5
2014	AFC Champions League	Group B	(Uzbekistan) Bunyodkor	0–0	2−3	4th
2014	AFC Champions League	Group B	(Iran) Foolad	1–5	0−1	4th
2014	AFC Champions League	Group B	(Qatar) El Jaish	0–0	0−2	4th
2017	AFC Champions League	PO	(Uzbekistan) Nasaf Qarshi	1–0	–	1–0
2017	AFC Champions League	Group B	(Iran) Esteghlal Khuzestan	1–1	0−1	3rd
2017	AFC Champions League	Group B	(Qatar) Lekhwiya	2–2	1−4	3rd
2017	AFC Champions League	Group B	(United Arab Emirates) Al Jazira	3–1	0−0	3rd

== Coaching staff ==
Position	Name
Head coach	(Morocco) Jamal Sellami
Assistant coach	(Egypt) Ahmed Magdy (Morocco) Mustapha Khalfi (Morocco) Issam El Adoua
Goalkeeping coach	(Morocco) Ahmed Mohamadina
Fitness coach	(Morocco) Jawad Sabri (South Africa) Kopano Melesi
Performance analyst	(South Africa) Kyle Solomon
Performance manager	(Germany) Michael Pfannkuch
Head of performance	(England) James Purdue
Head of medical	(Saudi Arabia) Hussein Al-Jaffar
Doctor	(Saudi Arabia) Dr. Ihab Al-Hamid
Physiotherapist	(Saudi Arabia) Thamer Al-Ghannad
Director of football	(Saudi Arabia) Abdulkader Al-Aqdi

== Managers ==
- (England) George Kirby (1986 – 1987)
- (Saudi Arabia) Ahmed Al-Saud (1997 – 1998)
- (Egypt) Moustafa Younis (1998 – 1999)
- (Morocco) Hocine Belhassen (July 1, 1999 – December 15, 2000)
- (Bosnia and Herzegovina) Senad Kreso (December 15, 2000 – August 1, 2001)
- (Bosnia and Herzegovina) Faruk Jusić (September 5, 2001 – December 30, 2001)
- (Saudi Arabia) Ahmed Al-Saud (caretaker) (December 30, 2001 – January 21, 2002)
- (Saudi Arabia) Ali Boushlaibi (January 21, 2002 – May 30, 2002)
- (Tunisia) Mondher Ladhari (July 1, 2002 – May 30, 2004)
- (Saudi Arabia) Fahad Al-Shurfa (caretaker) (July 12, 2004 – September 6, 2004)
- (Tunisia) Zouhair Louati (September 6, 2004 – May 30, 2005)
- (Morocco) Najib Hemimo (August 1, 2005 – November 1, 2005)
- (Saudi Arabia) Ali Bo Saleh (caretaker) (November 1, 2005 – December 23, 2005)
- (Tunisia) Rachid Ben Ammar (December 23, 2005 – March 6, 2006)
- (Egypt) Bahaaeddine Qebisi (March 9, 2006 – January 12, 2007)
- (Saudi Arabia) Ali Bo Saleh (caretaker) (January 12, 2007 – February 2, 2007)
- (Tunisia) Omar Meziane (February 2, 2007 – June 1, 2007)
- (Bosnia and Herzegovina) Senad Kreso (July 31, 2007 – December 31, 2007)
- (Saudi Arabia) Yousef Al-Sarouj (caretaker) (December 31, 2007 – January 24, 2008)
- (Tunisia) Fathi Al-Jabal (January 24, 2008 – May 26, 2014)
- (Spain) Juan José Maqueda (May 27, 2014 – September 25, 2014)
- (Tunisia) Nacif Beyaoui (October 1, 2014 – May 29, 2016)
- (Portugal) Ricardo Sá Pinto (May 29, 2016 – September 23, 2016)
- (Tunisia) Fathi Al-Jabal (October 11, 2016 – October 14, 2019)
- (Belgium) Yannick Ferrera (October 14, 2019 – January 9, 2022)
- (Greece) Georgios Donis (January 9, 2022 – May 31, 2023)
- (Croatia) Slaven Bilić (July 8, 2023 – August 16, 2024)
- (Sweden) Jens Gustafsson (August 22 – December 4, 2024)
- (Germany) Guido Hoffmann (caretaker) (December 4–12, 2024)
- (Portugal) José Gomes (December 12, 2024 – May 31, 2026)
- (Saudi Arabia) Khaled Al-Atwi (July 7, 2026 – October 8, 2026)
- (Morocco) Jamal Sellami (October 8, 2026 – present)

== See also ==
- List of football clubs in Saudi Arabia
