= Hamzah Idris =

Saudi Arabian footballer (born 1972)

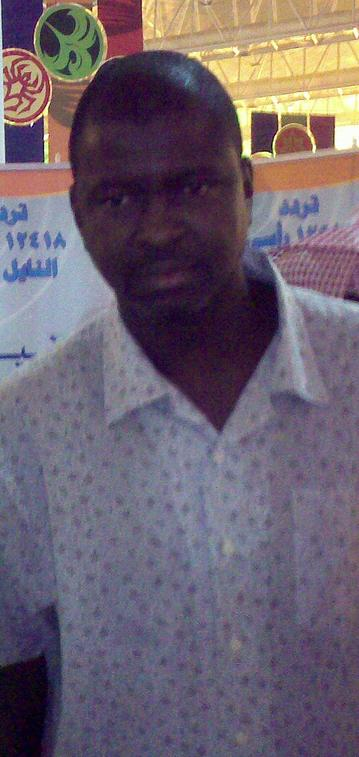

Personal information
- Full name: Hamzah Idris Falatah
- Date of birth: 8 October 1972 (age 54)
- Place of birth: Medina, Saudi Arabia
- Height: 1.78 m (5 ft 10 in)
- Position: Striker

Youth career
- 1983–1989: Ohud

Senior career*
| Years | Team | Apps | (Gls) |
| 1988–1997 | Ohud | | |
| 1997–2007 | Al Ittihad | | (84) |

International career^{‡}
| 1996 | Saudi Arabia Olympic (O.P.) | 3 | (0) |
| 1990–2005 | Saudi Arabia | 67 | (17) |
- * Club domestic league appearances and goals as of 4 January 2023 ‡ National team caps and goals as of 14 February 2022

Hamzah Idris Falatah (Arabic: حَمْزَة إِدْرِيس فَلَاتَة, born 8 October 1972) is a Saudi Arabian former footballer. He played as a striker for Ohud from 1992 to 1995 and then for Al Ittihad until he retired in 2007.

For Saudi Arabia national team, Falatah participated in the 1994 FIFA World Cup, 1996 Summer Olympics and the 1999 FIFA Confederations Cup.

He held the national record for most goals scored in one season at 33 goals for the 1999–2000 season. This record was superseded in 2018–2019 season, when Abderrazak Hamdallah scored 34 goals .

Falatah is currently an assistant coach for Al-Ittihad, He was number 9 for Al-Ittihad.

== Club Career Stats ==
| Club | Season | League | | SFC | | SCPC | | Continental | | SFC | | Total | | |
| Club | Season | Apps | Goals | Apps | Goals | Apps | Goals | Apps | Goals | Apps | Goals | Apps | Goals | Assist |
|---|---|---|---|---|---|---|---|---|---|---|---|---|---|---|
| Ohod | 1988–89 | | 9 | | | | | | | | | | | |
| Ohod | 1989–90 | | 11 | | | | | | | | | | | |
| Ohod | 1990–91 | | 9 | | | | | | | | | | | |
| Ohod | 1991–92 | | | | | | | | | | | | | |
| Ohod | 1992–93 | | 10 | | | | | | | | | | | |
| Ohod | 1994–95 | | | | | | | | | | | | | |
| Ohod | 1994–95 | | | | | | | | | | | | | |
| Ohod | 1995–96 | | | | | | | | | | | | | |
| Ohod | 1996–97 | | | | | | | | | | | | | |
| Career total | | | | | | | 1 | | | | | | | |
| Al Ittihad | 1997–98 | 0 | 0 | 1 | 0 | 0 | 0 | | | | | 1 | 0 | |
| Al Ittihad | 1998–99 | | 10 | | 6 | | 0 | | 11 (Note: 5 Goals in GCC Champions League) (Note: 4 Goals in 1999 Arab Club Champions Cup) (Note: 2 Goals in 1998–99 Asian Cup Winners' Cup) | | | | 27 | |
| Al Ittihad | 1999–2000 | 24 | 33 | | 0 | | 3 | | 1 (Note: 1 Goal in 1999–2000 Asian Cup Winners' Cup) | | 6 | | 43 | |
| Al Ittihad | 2000–01 | | 5 | | 2 | | | | 3 (Note: 3 Goals in 2000–01 Asian Club Championship) | | | | | |
| Al Ittihad | 2001–02 | | 10 | | | | 3 | | | | | | | |
| Al Ittihad | 2002–03 | | 6 | | 2 | | 1 | | 3 (Note: 1 Goal in Saudi-Egyptian Super Cup) (Note: 2 Goals in 2002 Arab Unified Club Championship) | | | | | |
| Al Ittihad | 2003–04 | | 3 | | | | 1 | | 2 (Note: 1 Goal in 2004 AFC Champions League) (Note: 1 Goal in 2003–04 Arab Champions League) | | | | | |
| Al Ittihad | 2004–05 | 15 | 7 | | | | | | 5 (Note: 4 Goal in 2004–05 Arab Champions League) | | | | | |
| Al Ittihad | 2005–06 | | 4 | | | | | | 2 (Note: 1 Goal in 2005 AFC Champions League) (Note: 1 Goal in 2005–06 Arab Champions League) | | | | | |
| Al Ittihad | 2006–07 | | 6 | | | | | | | | | | | |
| Career total | | | 84 | | 13 | | 8 | | 27 | | 6 | | 138 | |

== Honours ==
Al-Ittihad

- AFC Champions League (2): 2004, 2005
- Asian Cup Winners Cup (1): 1999
- Saudi Professional League (5): 1999, 2000, 2001, 2003, 2007
- Saudi Crown Prince Cup (2): 2001, 2004
- Arab Champions League (1): 2005
- GCC Club Cup (1): 1999
- Saudi-Egyptian Super Cup (2): 2001, 2003
