= 2013–14 Saudi First Division =

Saudi First Division
- Season: 2013–14

The RAKAA Professional League is the First Division in Saudi Arabia.

In the end of the Season 2012–13 the league was called Saudi First Division, but the league name has been renamed to RAKAA Professional League and the name stands for a Holding provider called RAKAA which is now become an official sponsor of the First Division.

== Teams ==
Club	Location	Stadium
Abha	Abha	Prince Sultan bin Abdul Aziz Stadium
Al-Nahda	Dammam	Prince Fahad bin Salman Stadium
Al-Ansar	Medina	Prince Mohammed bin Abdul Aziz Stadium
Al-Jeel	Al-Hasa	Prince Abdullah bin Jalawi Stadium
Al-Khaleej	Saihat	Al-Khaleej Club Stadium
Al-Qadisiya	Al Khubar	Prince Saud bin Jalawi Stadium
Al-Nahda	Dammam	Prince Fahad bin Salman Stadium
Al-Kawkb	Al-Kharj	Al-Shoalah Club Stadium
Al-Ta'ee	Ha'il	Prince Abdul Aziz bin Musa'ed Stadium
Al-Watani	Tabuk	King Khalid Sport City Stadium
Ohud	Medina	Prince Mohammed bin Abdul Aziz Stadium
Al Hazm	Ar Rass	Al Hazm Club Stadium
Al-Riyadh	Riyadh	Prince Turki bin Abdul Aziz Stadium
Hetten	Samtah	King Faisal Sport City Stadium
Al-Diriyah	Diriyah	Prince Turki bin Abdulaziz Stadium
Al-Orubah	Al-Jawf	Al-Orubah Club Stadium

== League table ==
Pos	Team	Pld	W	D	L	GF	GA	GD	Pts	Promotion or relegation
1	Hajer (C)	30	16	9	5	45	28	+17	57	Promotion to Professional League
2	Al-Khaleej	30	16	7	7	57	27	+30	55	Promotion to Professional League
3	Al-Wehda	30	14	10	6	48	28	+20	52	
4	Al-Tai	30	12	10	8	35	29	+6	46	
5	Al-Hazem	30	13	7	10	38	35	+3	46	
6	Al-Riyadh	30	12	9	9	52	44	+8	45	
7	Al-Qadisiyah	30	11	12	7	31	23	+8	45	
8	Al-Diriyah	30	11	8	11	42	43	−1	41	
9	Al-Batin	30	10	10	10	38	38	0	40	
10	Abha	30	9	12	9	41	40	+1	39	
11	Al-Jeel	30	8	14	8	37	42	−5	38	
12	Al-Watani	30	9	8	13	36	41	−5	35	
13	Hetten	30	8	6	16	35	56	−21	30	
14	Ohod (R)	30	7	6	17	35	52	−17	27	Relegation to Saudi Second Division
15	Al-Ansar (R)	30	6	9	15	27	50	−23	27	Relegation to Saudi Second Division
16	Al-Kawkab (R)	30	5	9	16	39	60	−21	24	Relegation to Saudi Second Division

Source: Thesaff.com (in Arabic)
Rules for classification: 1) Points; 2)Head-to-Head points; 3) Head-to-Head goal difference; 4) Head-to-Head goal scored; 5) Total goal difference; 6) Total goals scored; 7) play-off (only for deciding champion, promotion and relegation).
(C) Champions; (R) Relegated
