= 1993–94 Saudi First Division =

Saudi First Division
- Season: 1993–94

Statistics of the 1993–94 Saudi First Division.

Pos	Team	Pld	Pts	Promotion or relegation
1	Al-Najma	18	36	Promotion to the Saudi Professional League
2	Al-Rawdhah	18	0	Promotion to the Saudi Professional League
3	Al-Shoalah	18	29	
4	Al Taawon	18	26	
5	Al-Arabi	18	25	
6	Al-Tai	18	22	
7	Hajer	18	22	
8	Al-Ansar	18	0	
9	Najran	18	18	Relegate to Saudi Second Division
10	Al Tuhami	18	0	Relegate to Saudi Second Division
