= 1991–92 Saudi First Division =

Saudi First Division
- Season: 1991–92
- Champions: Al-Raed

Statistics of the 1991–92 Saudi First Division.

Pos	Team	Pld	W	D	L	GF	GA	GD	Pts	Promotion or relegation (Note: Errors in table: 59 total wins != 57 total losses and 191 total for != 204 total against)
1	Al-Raed	18	10	6	2	28	13	+15	26	Promotion to the Saudi Professional League
2	Al-Najma	18	10	6	2	20	17	+3	26	Promotion to the Saudi Professional League
3	Al-Arabi	18	8	6	4	20	16	+4	22	
4	Hajer	18	9	4	5	25	12	+13	22	
5	Al-Oyoon	18	5	8	5	16	18	−2	18	
6	Al-Ansar	18	4	9	5	22	20	+2	17	
7	Al Taawon	18	5	6	7	17	20	−3	16	
8	Al-Rawdhah	18	5	6	7	19	24	−5	16	
9	Damac	18	2	10	6	11	24	−13	14	Relegate to Saudi Second Division
10	Al Jabalain	18	1	3	14	13	40	−27	5	Relegate to Saudi Second Division
