= 1996–97 Saudi First Division =

Saudi First Division
- Season: 1996–97
- Champions: Al Taawoun FC
- Relegated: Al-Watani & Al Tuhami Club

Statistics of the 1996–97 Saudi First Division.

Pos	Team	Pld	Pts	Promotion or relegation
1	Al-Taawoun FC	18	37	Promotion to the Saudi Professional League
2	Al-Shoalah	18	36	Promotion to the Saudi Professional League
3	Al Jabalain	18	0	
4	Al-Rawdhah	18	0	
5	Al-Raed	18	0	
6	Hajer	18	0	
7	Ohud	18	0	
8	Al-Khaleej	18	0	
9	Al-Watani	18	0	Relegate to Saudi Second Division
10	Al Tuhami	18	0	Relegate to Saudi Second Division
