= Morad Al-Soudani =

Saudi Arabian footballer

Personal information
- Full name: Morad Mahdi Al-Soudani
- Date of birth: October 28, 1989 (age 37)
- Place of birth: Saudi Arabia
- Height: 1.70 m (5 ft 7 in)
- Position: Right back

Youth career
- Al-Ahli

Senior career*
Years	Team	Apps	(Gls)
2008–2012	Al-Ahli	1	(0)
2009–2010	→ Al-Raed (loan)	0	(0)
2012–2014	Al-Ansar		
2014–2015	Al-Nahda		
2015	Al-Faisaly	1	(0)
2016–2018	Al-Watani		
- * Club domestic league appearances and goals

Morad Al-Soudani (born 28 October 1989) is a Saudi football player.
