= Djamel Belkacem =

Tunisian football manager

Personal information
- Full name: Djamel Mohammed Belkacem
- Date of birth: 13 December 1958 (age 67)
- Place of birth: Tunisia

Managerial career
- Years: Team
- 2001–2004: Damac
- 2008–2009: Ohod
- 2009–2011: Al-Ansar
- 2011–2012: Al-Riyadh
- 2012–2014: Al-Orobah
- 2014–2015: Al-Qadsiah
- 2016: Al-Ettifaq
- 2017–2018: Al-Wehda
- 2018–2019: Al-Tai
- 2020: Al-Kawkab
- 2020: Ohod
- 2021–2022: Al-Orobah
- 2022–2023: Al-Ula

Djamel Belkacem (Arabic: جَمَال بَلْقَاسِم; born 13 December 1958) is a Tunisian football manager who was most recently the manager of Saudi club Al-Ula.

== Honours ==
=== Manager ===
Damac

- Saudi Third Division runner-up: 2002–03

Al-Ansar

- Saudi First Division runner-up: 2010–11

Al-Orobah

- Saudi First Division: 2012–13

Al-Qadsiah

- Saudi First Division: 2014–15

Al-Ettifaq

- Saudi First Division: 2015–16

Al-Wehda

- MS League: 2017–18
