= Abdulhaleem Al-Amoudi =

Saudi Arabian footballer

Personal information
- Full name: Abdulhaleem Al-Amoudi
- Date of birth: August 19, 1986 (age 40)
- Place of birth: Saudi Arabia
- Height: 1.70 m (5 ft 7 in)
- Position: Forward

Youth career
- Ohud

Senior career*
Years	Team	Apps	(Gls)
2007–2009	Ohud		
2010	Al-Ansar		
2010–2012	Ohud		
2012–2014	Al-Nahda		
2014	Al-Raed		
2014–2015	Al-Nahda		
2015–2016	Al-Orobah		
2016	Ohud		
2016–2017	Al-Nahda		
2017–2018	Ohud		
2018	Al Kawkb		
- * Club domestic league appearances and goals

Abdulhaleem Al-Amoudi (Arabic: عبد الحليم العمودي; born August 19, 1986) is a Saudi Arabian football player who plays a forward .
