= 2011–12 Saudi Second Division =

Saudi Second Division
- Season: 2011–12

The Saudi Second Division is the Third level football competition in Saudi Arabia. Qualified three teams to Saudi First Division.

== Teams ==
Club	Location (Note: site of the club and not the site of the stadium)	Stadium
Al-Arabi	Unaizah	Department of Education Stadium
Al-Adalh	Al-Holilah	Prince Abdullah bin Jalawi Stadium
Al-Safa	Safwa City	Al-Safa Club Stadium
Al-Oyoun	Al-Oyoun	Prince Abdullah bin Jalawi Stadium
Al-Diriyah	Diriyah	Prince Turki bin Abdulaziz Stadium
Al-Trgee	Qatif	Prince Nayef bin Abdul Aziz Sports City Stadium
Al-Faiha	Al Majma'ah	Prince Salman Bin Abdulaziz Sport City Stadium
Al-Taqdom	Muznib	Al-Taqdom Club Stadium
Al-Kawkab	Al-Kharj	Al-Shoalah Club Stadium
Sdoos	Sdoos	Prince Faisal bin Fahd Stadium
Al-Nakheal	Bisha	Department of Education Stadium
Al Akhdoud	Najran	Al Akhdoud Club Stadium
Al-Rbeea	Jeddah	Prince Abdullah al-Faisal Stadium
Al-Ameade	Al-Atawelah	King Saud Sport City Stadium
Al-Hamadah	Al-Ghat	Al-Hamadah Club Stadium
Najd	Sudair	Prince Salman Bin Abdulaziz Sport City Stadium
Al-Rummah	Badaya	Al-Amal Club Stadium
Al Jabalain	Ha'il	Prince Abdul Aziz bin Musa'ed Stadium
Al-Slam	Al-Awamiyah	Prince Nayef bin Abdul Aziz Sports City Stadium
Al-Najma	Unaizah	Al-Najma Club Stadium

== Final league table ==
Group A
Pos	Team	Pld	W	D	L	GF	GA	GD	Pts	Promotion or relegation
1	Al-Najma	18	11	2	5	36	16	+20	35	Promotion to the Saudi First Division
2	Al-Kawkab	18	9	5	4	26	16	+10	32	Qualified for Third Place
3	Al-Adalh	18	7	9	2	25	15	+10	30	
4	Al-Arabi	18	8	5	5	18	18	0	29	
5	Al-Safa	18	6	7	5	22	22	0	25	
6	Al-Oyoun	18	6	6	6	24	25	−1	24	
7	Al-Trgee	18	6	4	8	22	29	−7	22	
8	Najd	18	5	5	8	25	27	−2	20	
9	Al Akhdoud	18	3	5	10	19	25	−6	14	Relegate to Saudi Third Division
10	Al-Nakheal	18	2	6	10	15	39	−24	12	Relegate to Saudi Third Division

Group B
Pos	Team	Pld	W	D	L	GF	GA	GD	Pts	Promotion or relegation
1	Sdoos	18	14	3	1	41	13	+28	45	Promotion to the Saudi First Division
2	Al-Rbeea	18	10	5	3	40	22	+18	35	Qualified for Third Place
3	Al-Diriyah	18	8	3	7	28	22	+6	27	
4	Al Jabalain	18	7	3	8	27	23	+4	24	
5	Al-Rummah	18	7	3	8	33	33	0	24	
6	Al-Hamadah	18	5	6	7	27	30	−3	21	
7	Al-Faiha	18	6	3	9	23	36	−13	21	
8	Al-Ameade	18	5	5	8	27	39	−12	20	
9	Al-Taqdom	18	4	7	7	22	31	−9	19	Relegate to Saudi Third Division
10	Al-Slam	18	3	4	11	17	36	−19	13	Relegate to Saudi Third Division

=== Third place match ===
30 March 2012	Al-Kawkab	2–0	Al-Rbeea	Al-Shoalah Club Stadium, Al-Kharj
	67' Sultan Al-Zahrani; 73' Nasser Asiri

5 April 2012	Al-Rbeea	4–1	Al-Kawkab	Prince Abdullah al-Faisal Stadium, Jeddah
	Hatem Rizieq 1'; Saud Salwati 3'; Saud Salwati 69'; Mohammed Al-Abdali 89' (pen.)		29' Omar Kassar

=== Final ===
30 March 2012	Al-Najma	1–2	Sdoos	Al-Najma Club Stadium, Unaizah
	Basil Al-Azmi 86'		Walid Saleh 30'; Majid Al Dossary 34'	Referee: Amer Al-Shahry

5 April 2012	Sdoos	2–2 (a.e.t.)	Al-Najma	Prince Faisal bin Fahd Stadium, Riyadh
	Dhaya Haroon 92' (pen.); Abdullah Ayyash 97'		Mohammed Al-Mayouf 6'; Fawaz Al-Murjan 72'

Saudi Premier League
2011–12 winners
Sdoos
1st title
