= 1987–88 Saudi First Division =

Saudi First Division
- Season: 1987–88
- Champions: Hajer

Statistics of the 1987–88 Saudi First Division.

Pos	Team	Pld	Pts	Promotion or relegation
1	Hajer	18	24	Promotion to the Saudi Professional League
2	Al-Rawdhah	18	20	Promotion to the Saudi Professional League
3	Al-Riyadh	18	20	
4	Al-Feiha	18	19	
5	Al Jabalain	18	18	
6	Al-Arabi	18	17	
7	Al Taawon	18	17	
8	Al-Raed	18	17	
9	Al-Shoalah	18	15	Relegate to Saudi Second Division
10	Al-Ansar	18	13	Relegate to Saudi Second Division
