= 1994–95 Saudi First Division =

Saudi First Division
- Season: 1994–95

Statistics of the 1994–95 Saudi First Division.

Pos	Team	Pld	W	D	L	GF	GA	GD	Pts	Promotion or relegation
1	Al-Tai	18	10	4	4	30	20	+10	34	Promotion to the Saudi Professional League
2	Al Taawon	18	9	5	4	22	12	+10	31 (Note: 1 point deducted?)	Promotion to the Saudi Professional League
3	Al-Shoalah	18	7	8	3	24	17	+7	29	
4	Ohud	18	7	8	3	19	14	+5	29	
5	Hajer	18	8	4	6	22	23	−1	28	
6	Al-Ansar	18	5	6	7	17	18	−1	21	
7	Al-Nahda	18	5	4	9	22	27	−5	19	
8	Sdoos	18	6	1	11	20	35	−15	19	
9	Al-Arabi	18	4	5	9	20	29	−9	17	Relegate to Saudi Second Division
10	Abha	18	3	7	8	25	26	−1	16	Relegate to Saudi Second Division
