= Hussein Al-Shuwaish =

Saudi Arabian footballer

Personal information
- Full name: Hussein Al-Shuwaish
- Date of birth: November 7, 1989 (age 37)
- Place of birth: Saudi Arabia
- Height: 1.85 m (6 ft 1 in)
- Position: Defender

Youth career
- –2004: Al-Rawdhah
- 2004–2007: Al-Nassr

Senior career*
Years	Team	Apps	(Gls)
2007–2008	Al-Nassr	1	(0)
2008–2013	Hajer	?	(?)
2013–2014	Al-Raed	18	(1)
2014–2015	Hajer	24	(0)
2015–2021	Al-Raed	104	(3)
2021–2024	Al-Fayha	82	(1)
2024–2026	Al-Orobah	62	(0)

International career^{‡}
2019	Saudi Arabia	1	(0)
- * Club domestic league appearances and goals as of 27 May 2024 ‡ National team caps and goals as of 4 August 2019

Hussein Al-Shuwaish (Arabic: حسين الشويش; born 7 November 1989) is a Saudi footballer who plays as a defender.

== Career ==
On 8 July 2021, Al-Shuwaish joined Al-Fayha on a two-year deal.

On 14 July 2024, Al-Shuwaish joined Al-Orobah on a one-year deal.

== Honours ==
Hajer

- First Division League: 2010–11

Al-Fayha

- King Cup: 2021–22
