= 1998–99 Saudi First Division =

Saudi First Division
- Season: 1998–99
- Champions: Sdoos

Statistics of the 1998–99 Saudi First Division.

| Pos | Team | Pld | W | D | L | GF | GA | GD | Pts | Promotion or relegation |
|---|---|---|---|---|---|---|---|---|---|---|
| 1 | Sdoos | 18 | 11 | 4 | 3 | 32 | 16 | +16 | 37 | Promotion to the Saudi Professional League |
| 2 | Al-Raed | 18 | 10 | 6 | 2 | 34 | 20 | +14 | 36 | Promotion to the Saudi Professional League |
| 3 | Al-Shoalah | 18 | 9 | 3 | 6 | 26 | 23 | +3 | 30 | |
| 4 | Najran | 18 | 6 | 7 | 5 | 21 | 19 | +2 | 25 | |
| 5 | Al-Khaleej | 18 | 7 | 3 | 8 | 24 | 21 | +3 | 24 | |
| 6 | Ohud | 18 | 6 | 6 | 6 | 26 | 24 | +2 | 24 | |
| 7 | Al-Qadsiah | 18 | 5 | 7 | 6 | 15 | 20 | −5 | 22 | |
| 8 | Al Taawon | 18 | 5 | 6 | 7 | 19 | 24 | −5 | 21 | |
| 9 | Al-Rawdhah | 18 | 2 | 8 | 8 | 24 | 35 | −11 | 14 | Relegate to Saudi Second Division |
| 10 | Al-Nahda | 18 | 2 | 4 | 12 | 14 | 33 | −19 | 10 | Relegate to Saudi Second Division |
