= 2012–13 Saudi First Division =

Saudi First Division
- Season: 2012–13
- Top goalscorer: Mosa Madakhali (22 goals)

The RAKAA Professional League is the First Division in Saudi Arabia.

At the end of the 2012–13 season the league was called Saudi First Division, but the league has been renamed to RAKAA Professional League and the name stands for a Holding provider called RAKAA which has now become an official sponsor of the First Division.

== Teams ==
Club	Location	Stadium
Abha	Abha	Prince Sultan bin Abdul Aziz Stadium
Al-Nahda	Dammam	Prince Fahad bin Salman Stadium
Al-Ansar	Medina	Prince Mohammed bin Abdul Aziz Stadium
Al-Jeel	Al-Hasa	Prince Abdullah bin Jalawi Stadium
Al-Khaleej	Saihat	Al-Khaleej Club Stadium
Al-Qadisiya	Al Khubar	Prince Saud bin Jalawi Stadium
Al-Nahda	Dammam	Prince Fahad bin Salman Stadium
Al-Najma	Unaizah	Al-Najma Club Stadium
Al-Ta'ee	Ha'il	Prince Abdul Aziz bin Musa'ed Stadium
Al-Watani	Tabuk	King Khalid Sport City Stadium
Al-Rabee	Jeddah	Prince Abdullah al-Faisal Stadium
Al Hazm	Ar Rass	Al Hazm Club Stadium
Al-Riyadh	Riyadh	Prince Turki bin Abdul Aziz Stadium
Hetten	Samtah	King Faisal Sport City Stadium
Sdoos	Sdoos	Prince Faisal bin Fahd Stadium
Al-Orubah	Al-Jawf	Al-Orubah Club Stadium

== League table ==
Pos	Team	Pld	W	D	L	Pts	Promotion or relegation
1	Al-Orubah	30	18	5	7	59	Promotion to the Saudi Professional League
2	Al-Nahda	30	15	10	5	55	Play off
3	Al-Khaleej	30	15	10	5	55	Play off
4	Al-Riyadh	30	15	10	5	55	Play off
5	Al-Qadisiya	30	12	9	9	45	
6	Hetten	30	12	7	11	43	
7	Al-Ta'ee	30	11	9	10	42	
8	Abha	30	11	8	11	41	
9	Al-Ansar	30	10	8	12	38	
10	Al-Batin	30	9	9	12	36	
11	Al-Watani	30	10	6	14	36	
12	Al-Hazm	30	10	5	15	35	
13	Al-Jeel	30	9	7	14	34	
14	Sdoos	30	7	9	14	30	Relegation to Saudi Second Division
15	Al-Najma	30	8	5	17	29	Relegation to Saudi Second Division
16	Al-Rabee	30	6	7	17	25	Relegation to Saudi Second Division

Source: RSSSF
