= 1997–98 Saudi Second Division =

Saudi Second Division
- Season: 1997–98
- Champions: Al-Nahda (1st title)

The 1997–98 Saudi Second Division was the 22nd season of the Saudi Second Division, since its establishment in 1976.

== Overview ==
The league consisted of eight teams. The top three teams were promoted to the 1998–99 Saudi First Division League. The bottom two teams were relegated.

== Teams ==
- Al-Nahda
- Sdoos
- Al-Arabi
- Mudhar
- Team 5 – Unknown
- Team 6 – Unknown
- Team 7 – Unknown
- Team 8 – Unknown

== League Table ==
Pos	Team	Pld	W	D	L	GF	GA	GD	Pts	Promotion or relegation
1	Al-Nahda	14	?	?	?	?	?	—	0	Promoted to the Saudi First Division League
2	Sdoos	14	?	?	?	?	?	—	24	Promoted to the Saudi First Division League
3	Al-Arabi	14	?	?	?	?	?	—	23	Promoted to the Saudi First Division League
4	Mudhar	14	?	?	?	?	?	—	0	
5	Unknown	14	?	?	?	?	?	—	0	
6	Unknown	14	?	?	?	?	?	—	0	
7	Unknown	14	?	?	?	?	?	—	0	Relegated
8	Unknown	14	?	?	?	?	?	—	0	Relegated

== Season Statistics ==
- League Top Scorer: Unknown
- Biggest Home Win: Unknown
- Biggest Away Win: Unknown
- Highest Scoring Match: Unknown
- Total Matches: Unknown
- Total Goals: Unknown
- Longest Winning Streak: Unknown
- Longest Unbeaten Run: Unknown
- Longest Losing Streak: Unknown
- Highest Attendance: Unknown
- Lowest Attendance: Unknown
- Average Attendance: Unknown

== See also ==
- Saudi Pro League
- Saudi First Division League
- Saudi Second Division League
- Saudi Arabian Football Federation
- Football in Saudi Arabia
