= 1992–93 Saudi First Division =

Saudi First Division
- Season: 1992–93
- Champions: Al-Nahda

The following is a table of the Statistics of the 1992–93 Saudi First Division, the second-tier league of football in Saudi Arabia.

Pos	Team	Pld	W	D	L	GF	GA	GD	Pts	Promotion or relegation
1	Al-Nahda	18	10	5	3	27	17	+10	25	Promotion to the Saudi Professional League
2	Ohud	18	6	10	2	29	19	+10	22	Promotion to the Saudi Professional League
3	Al-Rawdhah	18	8	5	5	19	12	+7	21	
4	Al-Arabi	18	6	8	4	29	21	+8	20	
5	Al Taawon	18	7	2	9	18	16	+2	16	
6	Al-Shoalah	18	4	8	6	20	22	−2	16	
7	Hajer	18	5	6	7	19	23	−4	16	
8	Al-Ansar	18	5	6	7	12	21	−9	16	
9	Al Akhdoud	18	5	5	8	18	19	−1	15	Relegate to Saudi Second Division
10	Al-Oyoon	18	5	3	10	16	34	−18	13	Relegate to Saudi Second Division
