= Mokhtar Al-Shanqiti =

Saudi Arabian footballer

Personal information
- Full name: Mokhtar Al-Shanqiti
- Date of birth: May 25, 1985 (age 41)
- Place of birth: Saudi Arabia
- Height: 1.73 m (5 ft 8 in)
- Position: Winger

Youth career
- Al-Ansar

Senior career*
Years	Team	Apps	(Gls)
2005–2014	Al-Ansar		
2014	Al-Ta'ee		
2014–2015	Al-Watani		
2015–2016	Ohod		
2016–2017	Al-Watani		
2021	Al-Ula		
- * Club domestic league appearances and goals

Mokhtar Al-Shanqiti (Arabic: مختار الشنقيطي; born May 25, 1985) is a Saudi football player who plays as a winger. He played in the Pro League for Al-Ansar.
