= Yasser Al-Mohammed =

Saudi Arabian footballer

Personal information
- Full name: Yasser Ali Al-Mohammed Al-Sudairy
- Date of birth: November 16, 1989 (age 36)
- Place of birth: Saudi Arabia
- Position: Midfielder

Team information
- Current team: Al-Qurayat

Youth career
- Al-Ittihad

Senior career*
Years	Team	Apps	(Gls)
2010–2012	Al-Watani		
2012–2013	Al-Nahda		
2013–2014	Najran		
2014–2015	Al-Fayha		
2015–2016	Al-Watani		
2017–2018	Al-Diriyah		
2018–2020	Al-Sadd		
2020–2021	Al-Najma		
2021	Al-Ansar		
2021–2022	Al-Rayyan		
2022–2023	Wej		
2023–2024	Al-Jeel		
2024–2025	Al-Hejaz		
2025–	Al-Qurayat		
- * Club domestic league appearances and goals

Yasser Al-Mohammed (born 16 November 1989) is a Saudi football player. He currently plays for Al-Qurayat as a midfielder.
