= 1988–89 Saudi First Division =

Saudi First Division
- Season: 1988–89
- Champions: Al-Riyadh

Statistics of the 1988–89 Saudi First Division.

Pos	Team	Pld	W	D	L	GF	GA	GD	Pts	Promotion or relegation
1	Al-Riyadh	18	12	5	1	35	14	+21	29	Promotion to the Saudi Professional League
2	Al-Raed	18	8	9	1	19	9	+10	25	Promotion to the Saudi Professional League
3	Ohud	18	9	4	5	33	19	+14	22	
4	Al Taawon	18	6	9	3	19	12	+7	21	
5	Al-Arabi	18	7	4	7	26	22	+4	18	
6	Al-Najma	18	7	4	7	18	19	−1	18	
7	Al-Feiha	18	6	2	10	20	28	−8	14	
8	Al-Watani	18	3	6	9	16	30	−14	12	
9	Al Kawkb	18	1	9	8	11	29	−18	11	Relegate to Saudi Second Division
10	Al Jabalain	18	2	5	11	11	26	−15	9	Relegate to Saudi Second Division

Source: RSSSF
