= 1997–98 Saudi First Division =

Saudi First Division
- Season: 1997–98
- Champions: Hajer

In 1997–98, the Saudi First Division, the second-tier league of football in Saudi Arabia, was won by Hajer of the Al-Ahsa region. Along with Al-Ansar they were promoted to the Saudi Pro League.

Statistics of the 1997–98 Saudi First Division.

Pos	Team	Pld	W	D	L	GF	GA	GD	Pts	Promotion or relegation
1	Hajer	18	12	4	2	35	10	+25	40	Promotion to the Saudi Professional League
2	Al-Ansar	18	9	4	5	27	23	+4	31	Promotion to the Saudi Professional League
3	Al-Qadisiyah	18	8	6	4	27	19	+8	30	
4	Al-Rawdhah	18	6	7	5	21	20	+1	25	
5	Al-Khaleej	18	6	5	7	24	25	−1	23	
6	Ohod Club	18	5	7	6	20	21	−1	22	
7	Al-Raed	18	6	2	10	32	40	−8	20	
8	Al Jabalain	18	4	7	7	17	22	−5	19	Relegate to relegation play-off
9	Najran	18	5	4	9	24	34	−10	19	Relegate to relegation play-off
10	Al Fateh	18	3	6	9	14	27	−13	15	Relegate to Saudi Second Division

Source: rsssf.com

== Play-off ==
- The play-off was played over a single leg at a neutral venue.
26 February 1998
16:00 (UTC+3)

Al Jabalain	0–0 (a.e.t.)	Najran
	(Arabic)
Penalties
	3–4

Prince Faisal bin Fahd Stadium, Riyadh
Referee: Mamdouh Al Mirdasi (Saudi Arabian)

0–0 on aggregate. Najran won 4–3 on penalties.
