= 2010–11 Saudi First Division =

Saudi First Division
- Season: 2010–11
- Champions: Hajer
- Matches: 240
- Top goalscorer: Hussein Al Turki (20 Goals)

In 2010–11 the Saudi First Division, the second-tier league of football in Saudi Arabia, was won by Hajer of the Al-Ahsa region. Along with Al-Ansar they were promoted to the Saudi Pro League.

== Teams ==
=== Stadia and locations ===
Locations of teams in the 2010-11 Saudi First Division

Club	Location	Stadium
Abha	Abha	Prince Sultan bin Abdul Aziz Stadium
Al-Adalah	Al-Holilah	Prince Abdullah bin Jalawi Stadium
Al-Ansar	Medina	Prince Mohammed bin Abdul Aziz Stadium
Al-Jeel	Al-Hasa	Prince Abdullah bin Jalawi Stadium
Al-Khaleej	Saihat	Al-Khaleej Club Stadium
Al-Najma	Unaizah	Al-Najma Club Stadium
Jeddah	Jeddah	Prince Abdullah al-Faisal Stadium
Al-Shoalah	Al-Kharj	Al-Shoalah Club Stadium
Al-Ta'ee	Ha'il	Prince Abdul Aziz bin Musa'ed Stadium
Al-Watani	Tabuk	King Khalid Sport City Stadium
Damac	Khamis Mushait	Prince Sultan bin Abdul Aziz Stadium
Hajer	Hofuf	Prince Abdullah bin Jalawi Stadium
Al-Riyadh	Riyadh	Prince Turki bin Abdul Aziz Stadium
Hetten	Samtah	King Faisal Sport City Stadium
Ohod Club	Medina	Prince Mohammed bin Abdul Aziz Stadium
Al-Orubah	Al-Jawf	Al-Orubah Club Stadium

== Final League table ==
Pos	Team	Pld	W	D	L	GF	GA	GD	Pts	Promotion or relegation
1	Hajer	30	19	6	5	51	32	+19	63	Promotion to the Saudi Professional League
2	Al-Ansar	30	15	10	5	40	24	+16	55	Promotion to the Saudi Professional League
3	Al-Riyadh	30	16	4	10	38	29	+9	52	
4	Abha	30	13	12	5	59	43	+16	51	
5	Al-Khaleej	30	14	7	9	44	36	+8	49	
6	Al-Watani	30	11	13	6	44	34	+10	46	
7	Al-Ta'ee	30	11	10	9	33	33	0	43	
8	Damac	30	10	9	11	51	47	+4	39	
9	Ohod Club	30	12	3	15	40	46	−6	39	
10	Hetten	30	9	10	11	48	39	+9	37	
11	Al-Orubah	30	10	7	13	44	55	−11	37	
12	Al-Jeel	30	9	8	13	36	45	−9	35	
13	Al-Shoalah	30	9	7	14	36	46	−10	34	
14	Al-Adalah	30	7	11	12	33	41	−8	32	Relegate to Saudi Second Division
15	Jeddah	30	5	7	18	37	60	−23	22	Relegate to Saudi Second Division
16	Al-Najma	30	4	8	18	32	56	−24	20	Relegate to Saudi Second Division

Source: RSSSF
