= 1985–86 Saudi First Division =

Saudi First Division
- Season: 1985-86
- Champions: Al-Ansar (1st) title
- Promoted: Al-Ansar; Al-Raed
- Relegated: Damac; Okaz
- Top goalscorer: Abdullah Al-Saab (8 goals)

The 1985-86 Saudi First Division was the 10th season of the Saudi First Division League.

== Team changes ==
The following teams have changed division since the 1984–85 season:

=== To First Division ===
Promoted from the 1984–85 Saudi Second Division League

- Al-Taawoun
- Al-Rawdhah

Relegated from the 1984-85 Saudi Premier League

- Al-Jabalain
- Ohod

=== From First Division ===
Promoted to the 1986-87 Saudi Premier League

- Al-Ansar
- Al-Raed

Relegated to 1986–87 Saudi Second Division

- Damac
- Okaz

Statistics of the 1986–87 Saudi First Division.

Pos	Team	Pld	W	D	L	GF	GA	GD	Pts	Promotion or relegation
1	Al-Ansar	18	10	5	3	29	13	+16	25	Promotion to the Saudi Premier League
2	Al-Raed	18	10	4	4	25	14	+11	24	Promotion to the Saudi Premier League
3	Al-Taawoun	18	9	5	4	20	11	+9	23	
4	Al-Fateh	18	7	6	5	15	14	+1	20	
5	Al-Jabalain	18	5	8	5	16	17	−1	18	
6	Al-Fayha	18	8	1	9	22	19	+3	17	
7	Ohod	18	6	5	7	13	15	−2	17	
8	Al-Rawdhah	18	5	6	7	22	17	+5	16	
9	Damac	18	4	7	7	12	18	−6	15	Relegated to Saudi Second Division
10	Okaz	18	1	3	14	6	42	−36	5	Relegated to Saudi Second Division

Source: RSSSF
