= 1989–90 Saudi First Division =

Saudi First Division
- Season: 1989–90
- Champions: Al-Najma

Statistics of the 1989–90 Saudi First Division.

Pos	Team	Pld	W	D	L	GF	GA	GD	Pts	Promotion or relegation
1	Al-Najma	18	11	4	3	18	10	+8	26	Promotion to the Saudi Professional League
2	Al-Arabi	18	11	2	5	25	16	+9	24	Promotion to the Saudi Professional League
3	Hajer	18	9	5	4	19	14	+5	23	
4	Ohud	18	8	5	5	25	12	+13	21	
5	Al Taawon	18	8	3	7	17	14	+3	19	
6	Al-Oyoon	18	6	5	7	14	16	−2	17	
7	Al-Rawdhah	18	3	9	6	12	16	−4	15	
8	Al-Watani	18	2	10	6	7	12	−5	14	
9	Al-Feiha	18	3	6	9	8	19	−11	12	Relegate to Saudi Second Division
10	Al-Khaleej	18	1	7	10	10	20	−10	9	Relegate to Saudi Second Division
