= 1990–91 Saudi First Division =

Saudi First Division
- Season: 1990–91
- Champions: Al-Nahda

Statistics of the 1990–91 Saudi First Division.

Pos	Team	Pld	W	D	L	GF	GA	GD	Pts	Promotion or relegation
1	Al-Nahda	18	9	7	2	34	16	+18	25	Promotion to the Saudi Professional League
2	Ohud	18	7	9	2	32	12	+20	23	Promotion to the Saudi Professional League
3	Al Taawon	18	8	6	4	26	19	+7	22	
4	Hajer	18	6	9	3	22	14	+8	21	
5	Al-Raed	18	7	6	5	26	23	+3	20	
6	Al-Rawdhah	18	3	10	5	20	30	−10	16	
7	Al-Oyoon	18	3	9	6	6	15	−9	15	
8	Damac	18	4	6	8	13	27	−14	14	
9	Al-Faisaly	18	4	5	9	18	30	−12	13	Relegate to Saudi Second Division
10	Al-Watani	18	2	7	9	14	28	−14	11	Relegate to Saudi Second Division
