= 1986–87 Saudi First Division =

Saudi First Division
- Season: 1986-87
- Champions: Al-Kawkab; 1st First Division title
- Promoted: Al-Kawkab; Ohod
- Relegated: Al-Fateh; Al-Jeel
- Top goalscorer: Khalid Al-Mansour (Al-Arabi) (16 goals)

The 1986-87 Saudi First Division was the 11th season of the Saudi First Division League.

== Team changes ==
The following teams have changed division since the 1985–86 season:

=== To First Division ===
Promoted from 1985–86 Saudi Second Division

- Al-Fateh
- Al-Jeel

Relegated from the 1985-86 Saudi Premier League

- Al-Kawkab
- Al-Riyadh

=== From First Division ===
Promoted to the 1986-87 Saudi Premier League

- Al-Kawkab
- Ohod

Relegated to 1986-87 Saudi Second Division

- Al-Fateh
- Al-Jeel

Statistics of the 1986–87 Saudi First Division.

Pos	Team	Pld	W	D	L	GF	GA	GD	Pts	Promotion or relegation
1	Al-Kawkab	18	11	7	0	31	11	+20	29	Promotion to the Saudi Professional League
2	Ohod	18	9	5	4	28	21	+7	23	Promotion to the Saudi Professional League
3	Al-Arabi	18	6	9	3	27	20	+7	21	
4	Al-Riyadh	18	8	3	7	31	19	+12	19	
5	Al Taawon	18	6	6	6	27	18	+9	18	
6	Al Jabalain	18	6	6	6	20	26	−6	18	
7	Al-Rawdhah	18	6	5	7	14	15	−1	17	
8	Al-Feiha	18	5	6	7	18	24	−6	16	
9	Al-Fateh	18	4	5	9	12	26	−14	13	Relegate to Saudi Second Division
10	Al-Jeel	18	1	4	13	11	39	−28	6	Relegate to Saudi Second Division

Source: RSSSF
