= Shaye Al-Nafisah =

Saudi Arabian footballer (1962–2023)

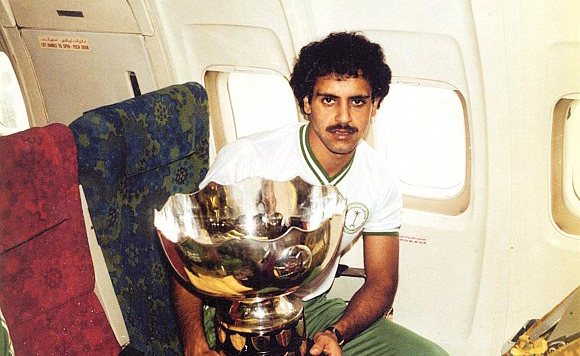
- Al-Nafisah holding the 1984 Asian Cup title

Personal information
- Full name: Shaye Mousa Al-Nafisah
- Date of birth: 20 March 1962
- Place of birth: Al-Kharj, Saudi Arabia
- Date of death: 15 January 2023 (aged 60)
- Position: Forward

Senior career*
Years	Team	Apps	(Gls)
1978–1991	Al-Kawkab	279	(112)

International career
1980–1986	Saudi Arabia	32	(10)
- * Club domestic league appearances and goals

Shaye Al-Nafisah (Arabic: شايع النفيسة; 20 March 1962 – 15 January 2023) was a Saudi Arabian footballer who played as a forward. He joined Al-Kawkab as a youth in 1977 and represented the first team a year later. He spent his entire career at Al-Kawkab and rejected offers from many top-tier sides such as Al-Hilal and Al-Nassr. Al-Nafisah retired at the age of 28 due to recurring injuries. Al-Nafisah represented the Saudi Arabia national team at the 1984 AFC Asian Cup and scored the first goal in the final.

== Career ==
Shaye Al-Nafisah was born in Al-Kharj, Saudi Arabia on 20 March 1962. He joined Al-Kawkab in the mid-1970s and participated in both the swimming and football teams. He had to choose to continue in either football or swimming as both of the team's schedules conflicted with each other. Al-Nafisah eventually chose to pursue a career in football.

In the late 1970s, scouts from the Jimmy Hill agency traveled to Al-Kharj to watch a match between the youth teams of Al-Kawkab and Al-Sharq. Al-Nafisah's talents surprised the scouts as he led his team to a 5–0 victory. The scouts sent a report to the coaches of the Saudi national team and he was called up for the 1979 Gulf Cup. Al-Nafisah did not make an appearance in the tournament as the falcons finished in 3rd place. Al-Nafisah became a regular for the national team in the early 1980s and was called up for the 1982 and 1984 Gulf Cups.

Despite playing for First Division side Al-Kawkab, Al-Nafisah made the national team squad for the 1984 AFC Asian Cup. Al-Nafisah famously scored the first goal in the final against China as the Falcons won the match 2–0 to win their first Asian Cup title. Years later, Al-Nafisah stated that he did not expect to start the final and was in disbelief when Khalil Al-Zayani called out his name when reading the line-up. Al-Nafisah also stated that on the night of the match he told teammate Abdullah Al-Deayea that he will score against China. His performances in the tournament led Al-Nafisah to stardom and he received many offers from big clubs such as Al-Hilal and Al-Nassr. Al-Nafisah rejected their offers and preferred to stay at Al-Kawkab to remain close to his family.

Al-Nafisah spent his entire career at Al-Kawkab and led the team to their first-ever promotion to the Saudi Premier League in 1985. He led Al-Kawkab to two promotions to Premier League in 1985 and 1987. In 1990, Al-Nafisah ruptured his ACL and MCL and underwent surgery. Shortly after coming back from injury, Al-Nafisah once again injured the same knee and underwent surgery. He decided to retire after injuring the same knee for the third time.

== Personal life and death ==
Al-Nafisah died on 15 January 2023, at the age of 60.

== Career statistics ==
Score and result list Saudi Arabia's goal tally first, score column indicates score after Al-Nafisah goal.

International goal scored by Shaye Al-Nafisah
No.	Date	Venue	Opponent	Score	Result	Competition
1	16 December 1984	National Stadium, Kallang, Singapore	China	1–0	2–0	1984 AFC Asian Cup

== Honours ==
Al-Kawkab

- Saudi First Division: 1986–87
- Saudi Second Division: 1978–79

Saudi Arabia

- AFC Asian Cup: 1984
