= 1999–2000 Saudi First Division =

Saudi First Division
- Season: 1999–2000

In 1999–2000 Saudi First Division, the second-tier league of football in Saudi Arabia, was won by Al-Ansar F.C. of the Medina region. Along with Al-Qadisiyah they were promoted to the Saudi Professional League.

== Final league table ==
Pos	Team	Pld	W	D	L	GF	GA	GD	Pts	Promotion or relegation
1	Al-Ansar	18	9	7	2	29	17	+12	34	Promotion to the Saudi Professional League
2	Al-Qadisiyah	18	8	9	1	23	10	+13	33	Promotion to the Saudi Professional League
3	Hajer	18	9	5	4	18	13	+5	32	
4	Al Fateh	18	6	6	6	22	26	−4	24	
5	Al-Orubah	18	6	4	8	19	21	−2	22	
6	Al-Shoalah	18	6	4	8	20	21	−1	22	
7	Al-Khaleej	18	5	5	8	16	21	−5	20	
8	Al Taawon	18	4	7	7	20	23	−3	19	Relegate to relegation play-off
9	Najran	18	4	7	7	21	27	−6	19	Relegate to relegation play-off
10	Ohud	18	3	6	9	16	25	−9	15	Relegate to Saudi Second Division

Source: RSSSF

== Relegation play-offs ==
Al Taawon, who finished 8th, faced Najran, who finished 9th for a two-legged play-off.

Team 1	Agg.	Team 2	1st leg	2nd leg
Najran	4–4	Al Taawon	1–3	1–3

=== First leg ===
25 February 2000
16:40 (UTC+3)

Najran	3–1	Al Taawon
Cosevi 55'; Mohammed Harshan 75'; Mohammed Harshan 88'	Report	20' Samba John

Al Akhdoud Club Stadium, Najran
Referee: Abdulaziz Al Dakhil, (Saudi Arabian)

=== Second leg ===
2 March 2000
20:40 (UTC+3)

Al Taawon	3–1	Najran
Samba John 2'; Saeed Al Ahmari 48'; Mousa Sahab Al Rashidi 55'	Report	(؟)Cosevi
Penalties
Mousa Sahab Al Rashidi (penalty scored); Hamad Al Hammad (penalty scored); Abdullah Dakhil (penalty scored); Ahmad ِAl Homaid (penalty scored); Fouad Al Shaalan (penalty scored); Abdulaziz Al Mansor (penalty scored)	6–5	(penalty scored) Cosevi; (penalty scored) Nasse ba Rema; (penalty scored) Mohammed Harshan; (penalty scored) Dhafr Saad; (penalty scored) Salm Al mini (penalty missed) Ahmed Salm

King Abdullah Sport City Stadium, Buraidah
Referee: Omer Al Mehannah, (Saudi Arabian)

4–4 on aggregate. Al Taawon won 6–5 on penalties.
