= 1998–99 Saudi Premier League =

Saudi Premier League
- Season: 1998–99
- Champions: Al-Ittihad (3rd title)
- Relegated: Hajer; Al-Ansar
- Asian Club Championship: Al-Ittihad
- Top goalscorer: Obeid Al-Dosari (20 goals)

Statistics of the 1998–99 Saudi Premier League.

== Clubs ==
Locations of teams in the 1998-99 Saudi Professional League

Club	Location	Stadium	Head coach
Al-Ahli	Jeddah	Prince Abdullah Al-Faisal Stadium	(Saudi Arabia) Amin Dabo
Al-Ansar	Medina	Prince Mohammed bin Abdul Aziz Stadium	
Al-Ettifaq	Dammam	Prince Mohamed bin Fahd Stadium	(Saudi Arabia) Khalil Al-Zayani
Al-Hilal	Riyadh	King Fahd Stadium	(Brazil) Lori Sandri
Al-Ittihad	Jeddah	Prince Abdullah Al-Faisal Stadium	(Federal Republic of Yugoslavia) Dimitri Davidović
Al-Najma	Unaizah	Department of Education Stadium	(Bulgaria) Christov Andenov
Al-Nassr	Riyadh	King Fahd Stadium	(Brazil) Procópio Cardoso
Al-Riyadh	Riyadh	King Fahd Stadium	
Al-Shabab	Riyadh	King Fahd Stadium	(Brazil) Oscar
Al-Tai	Ḥaʼil	Prince Abdul Aziz bin Musa'ed Stadium	(Saudi Arabia) Khalid Al-Koroni
Al-Wehda	Mecca	King Abdul Aziz Stadium	(Brazil) Gaúcho
Hajer	Hofuf	Prince Abdullah bin Jalawi Stadium	

=== Foreign players ===
Club	Player 1	Player 2	Player 3	Player 4	Player 5	Former players
Al-Ahli	(Ecuador) Gilson de Souza	(Senegal) Mohammed Manga				(Brazil) Tinho
Al-Ansar						
Al-Ettifaq						
Al-Hilal	(Kuwait) Bashar Abdullah	(Nigeria) Precious Monye	(Tunisia) Ayadi Hamrouni	(Zambia) Elijah Litana		(Colombia) John Jairo Tréllez (Paraguay) Edgar Báez
Al-Ittihad	(Brazil) Marcos Pereira	(England) Dalian Atkinson	(Morocco) Ahmed Bahja	(Morocco) Mourad Hdiouad	(Netherlands) Rob Witschge	(Peru) Roberto Valenzuela
Al-Najma						
Al-Nassr	(Peru) Álvaro Barco					(Ghana) Joe Addo
Al-Riyadh	(Senegal) Mamoun Diop					
Al-Shabab	(Kuwait) Bader Haji	(Mali) Yaya Dissa	(Nigeria) Rashidi Yekini			
Al-Tai						
Al-Wehda						
Hajer						

== League table ==
Pos	Team	Pld	W	D	L	GF	GA	GD	Pts
1	Al-Hilal	22	15	3	4	39	22	+17	48
2	Al-Ittihad	22	15	6	1	45	32	+13	48 (Note: 3 points deducted)
3	Al-Ahli	22	10	8	4	38	22	+16	38
4	Al-Shabab	22	10	8	4	40	23	+17	38
5	Al-Nassr	22	10	3	9	33	24	+9	33
6	Al-Ettifaq	22	8	6	8	29	30	−1	30
7	Al-Riyadh	22	7	6	9	30	32	−2	27
8	Al-Tai	22	7	4	11	24	40	−16	25
9	Al-Najma	22	6	5	11	26	33	−7	23
10	Al-Wehda	22	6	3	13	32	46	−14	21 (Note: Al-Wehda defeated Al-Ansar 1-0 in the end of season relegation playoff)
11	Al-Ansar	22	5	6	11	20	34	−14	21
12	Hajer	22	2	7	13	21	39	−18	13

== Playoffs ==
=== Semifinals ===
22 April 1999	Al-Ahli	0–1	Al-Hilal	Prince Abdullah al-Faisal Stadium, Jeddah
			Hamzah Saleh 4' (o.g.)	Referee: Omer Al Mehannah

25 April 1999	Al-Shabab	2–2	Al-Ittihad	King Fahd International Stadium, Riyadh
	Salem Suroor 56'; Jorgensen 88'		Hamzah Idris 25'; Sulaiman Al-Hadaithy 86'	Referee: Abdul Rahman Al-Zaid

29 April 1999	Al-Hilal	1–3	Al-Ahli	King Fahd International Stadium, Riyadh
	Bashar Abdullah 30' (pen.)		Khaled Gahwji 45'; Ibrahim Suwayed 49'; Andy Abdul 96'	Referee: Daffer Al-Shehri

30 April 1999	Al-Ittihad	2–1	Al-Shabab	Prince Abdullah al-Faisal Stadium, Jeddah
	Hamzah Idris 81'; Ahmed Bahja 93'		Saleh Al-Dawod 36'

=== Final ===
7 May 1999	Al-Ittihad	1–0	Al-Ahli	Prince Abdullah Al-Faisal Stadium, Jeddah
	Hamzah Idris 51'			Referee: Mujib Al-Dosari

Saudi Premier League
1998-99 winners

3rd title
