= Ahmed Al-Jahawi =

Saudi Arabian footballer

Personal information
- Full name: Ahmed Ibrahim Al-Jahawi
- Date of birth: October 1, 1979 (age 47)
- Place of birth: Diriyah, Saudi Arabia
- Position: Defender

Senior career*
Years	Team	Apps	(Gls)
2001–2006	Al-Nassr	?	(?)
2006–2007	Al-Faisaly	?	(?)
2007–2008	Najran	?	(?)
2008–2009	Al-Watani	?	(?)
2009–2010	Al-Arabi	?	(?)
2010–2012	Al-Shoalah	?	(?)
2012–2013	Al-Diriyah		
2013–2015	Al-Washm		
2015–2016	Al-Waseel		

International career
2002	Saudi Arabia	1	(0)
- * Club domestic league appearances and goals

Ahmed Al-Jahawi is a Saudi Arabian football player.

== International career ==
On 13 February 2002, Al-Jahawi made his debut for Saudi Arabia in a home game at King Fahd International Stadium against Denmark in which Saudi Arabia lost from a goal from Ebbe Sand in the 16th minute to make the score 1-0.
