= Chokri Khatoui =

Tunisian football manager

Managerial career
- Years: Team
- 2009–2010: Ohod
- 2012–2014: ES Métlaoui
- 2015: AS Gabès
- 2015: EO Sidi Bouzid
- 2015–2016: Al-Nahda
- 2016–2017: US Ben Guerdane
- 2017–2019: Tunisia U23
- 2019: Stade Tunisien
- 2019: US Ben Guerdane
- 2019–2020: Najran
- 2020: CS Hammam-Lif
- 2021: US Tataouine
- 2021-22: Ohod
- 2021-22: US Tataouine
- 2022-24: Abu Salim SC
- 2023-24: Al-Ahly Tripoli
- 2024-25: Al-Nasr SCSC (Benghazi)
- 2024-2025: Stade Tunisien

Chokri Khatoui is a Tunisian football manager.
