= Ibrahim Kabie =

Saudi Arabian footballer

Ibrahim Kabie إبراهيم كعبي
Personal information
- Full name: Ibrahim Yahia Kabie
- Date of birth: 29 August 1984 (age 42)
- Place of birth: Saudi Arabia
- Position: Defender

Youth career
- –2004: Al-Watani

Senior career*
Years	Team	Apps	(Gls)
2004–2013	Al-Watani		
2009	→ Al-Qadsiah (loan)		
2011–2012	→ Najran (loan)		
2013–2015	Al-Kawkab		
2015–2018	Al-Watani		
2018–2020	Al-Suqoor		
- * Club domestic league appearances and goals

Ibrahim Kabie (Arabic: إبراهيم كعبي; born 29 August 1984) is a Saudi Arabian footballer who plays as a defender.
