= 1995–96 Saudi First Division =

Saudi First Division
- Season: 1995–96

Statistics of the 1995–96 Saudi First Division.

Pos	Team	Pld	Pts	Promotion or relegation
1	Al-Wahda	18	0	Promotion to the Saudi Professional League
2	Al-Ansar	18	0	Qualification to promotion play-offs
3	Hajer	18	0	Qualification to promotion play-offs
4	?	18	0	
5	?	18	0	
6	?	18	0	
7	?	18	0	
8	?	18	0	
9	Al-Nahda	18	0	Relegate to Saudi Second Division
10	?	18	0	Relegate to Saudi Second Division

== Relegation play-offs ==
Al-Ansar, who finished 2nd, faced Hajer, who finished 3rd for a two-legged play-off.

=== First leg: ===
11 April 1996

Hajer	0–2	Al-Ansar
	Report	51' Musa Saleh (؟) Omar Aziz

Prince Abdullah bin Jalawi Stadium, Al-Ahsa
Referee: Abdul Rahman Al-Zaid, (Saudi Arabian)
