= Khaled Al-Maghrabi =

Saudi Arabian footballer

Personal information
- Full name: Khaled Ali Al-Maghrabi
- Date of birth: September 11, 1992 (age 34)
- Place of birth: Saudi Arabia
- Height: 1.72 m (5 ft 7 1/2 in)
- Position: Right back

Team information
- Current team: Al-Nahda
- Number: 30

Youth career
- Al-Qadisiyah

Senior career*
| Years | Team | Apps | (Gls) |
| 2013–2017 | Al-Qadisiyah | | |
| 2017 | → Al-Nahda (loan) | | |
| 2017–2019 | Damac | 64 | (1) |
| 2019–2020 | Al-Tai | 18 | (0) |
| 2020–2021 | Al-Sahel | 12 | (0) |
| 2021 | Al-Bukayriyah | 14 | (0) |
| 2021–2022 | Al-Kawkab | 22 | (0) |
| 2022–2023 | Al-Okhdood | 3 | (0) |
| 2023–2024 | Al-Zulfi | | |
| 2024–2025 | Al-Hada | | |
| 2025– | Al-Nahda | | |
- * Club domestic league appearances and goals as of 16 May 2023

Khaled Al-Maghrabi (Arabic: خالد المغربي, born 11 September 1992) is a Saudi Arabian football player who currently plays as a right back for Al-Nahda.
