= Khalid Al-Mansour =

Saudi Arabian footballer

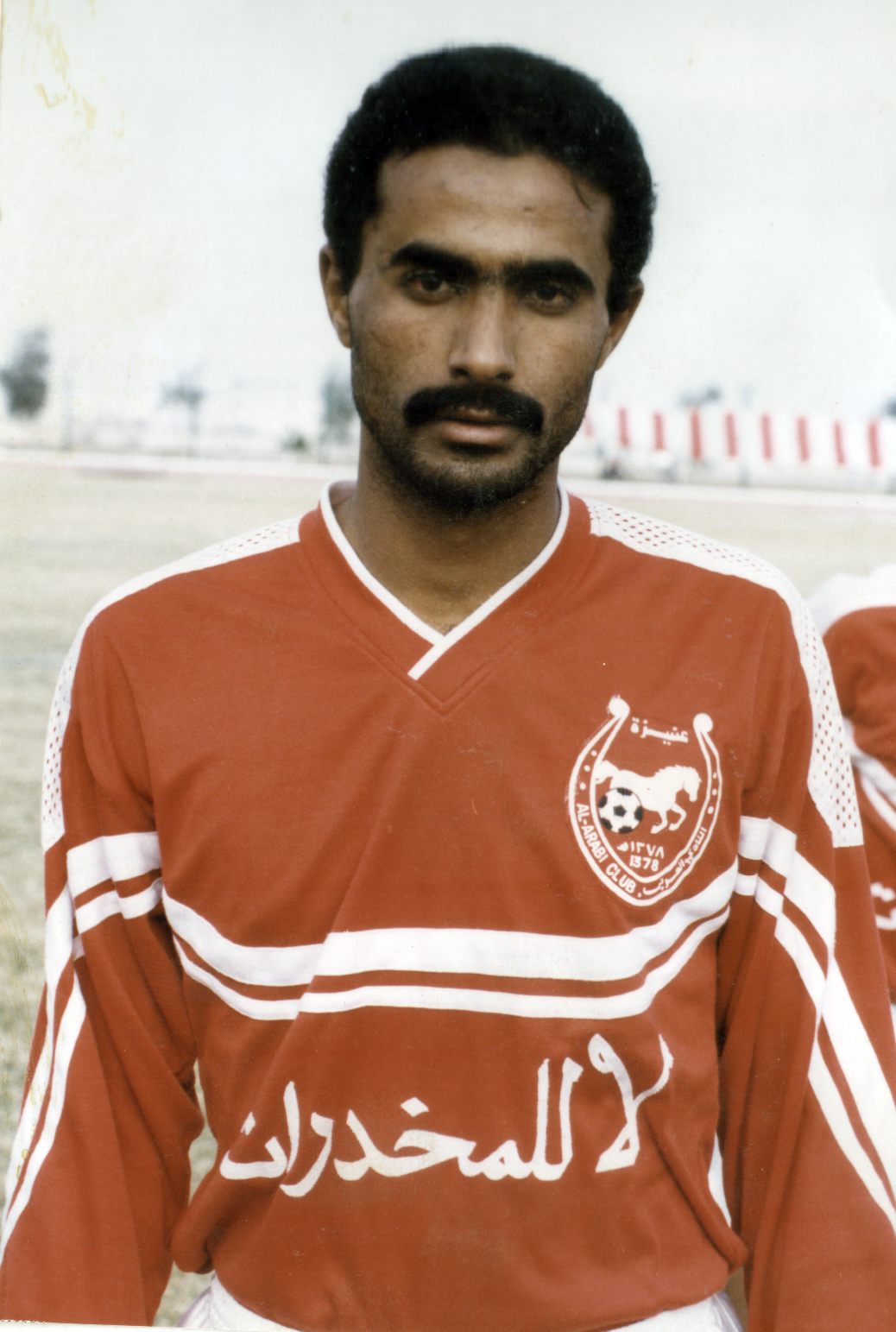

Personal information
- Full name: Khaled Ibrahim Al-Mansour
- Date of birth: 1965 (age 60–61)
- Place of birth: Unaizah, Saudi Arabia
- Height: 1.72 m (5 ft 7 1/2 in)
- Position: Striker

Senior career*
Years	Team	Apps	(Gls)
1985–1997	Al-Arabi		(67)
- * Club domestic league appearances and goals

Khalid Al-Mansour (Arabic: خالد المنصور; born 1965) is a retired football striker from Saudi Arabia, who played for Al-Arabi from 1985 to 1997. He played for the Al-Arabi first team without graded in age groups in 1985 and he won the Saudi First Division with Al-Arabi five times. He was selected for the Saudi Arabia national football team in 1993 but he refused owing to personal circumstances.

== See also ==
- Football in Saudi Arabia
- List of football clubs in Saudi Arabia
