= Saudi First Division League =

Professional football league in Saudi Arabia

First Division League دوري الدرجة الأولى
- Organising body: Saudi Arabian Football Federation (SAFF)
- Founded: 1957; 69 years ago
- Country: Saudi Arabia
- Confederation: AFC
- Number of clubs: 18 (since 2022–23)
- Level on pyramid: 2
- Promotion to: Saudi Pro League
- Relegation to: Saudi Second Division League
- Domestic cup: King's Cup
- International cup: AFC Champions League Two (via the King's Cup)
- Current champions: Abha (3rd title) (2025–26)
- Most championships: Hajer; Al-Wehda; Al-Qadsiah; Al-Jabalain (4 titles each)
- Top scorer: Ousmane Barry (108 goals)
- Broadcaster(s): Thmanyah
- Website: fdl.sa
- Current: 2026–27 First Division League

The Saudi First Division League (FDL), also known as the Yelo League for sponsorship reasons, is a professional association football league in Saudi Arabia and serves as the second tier of the Saudi football league system. It ranks directly below the Saudi Pro League and above the Saudi Second Division League.

== History ==
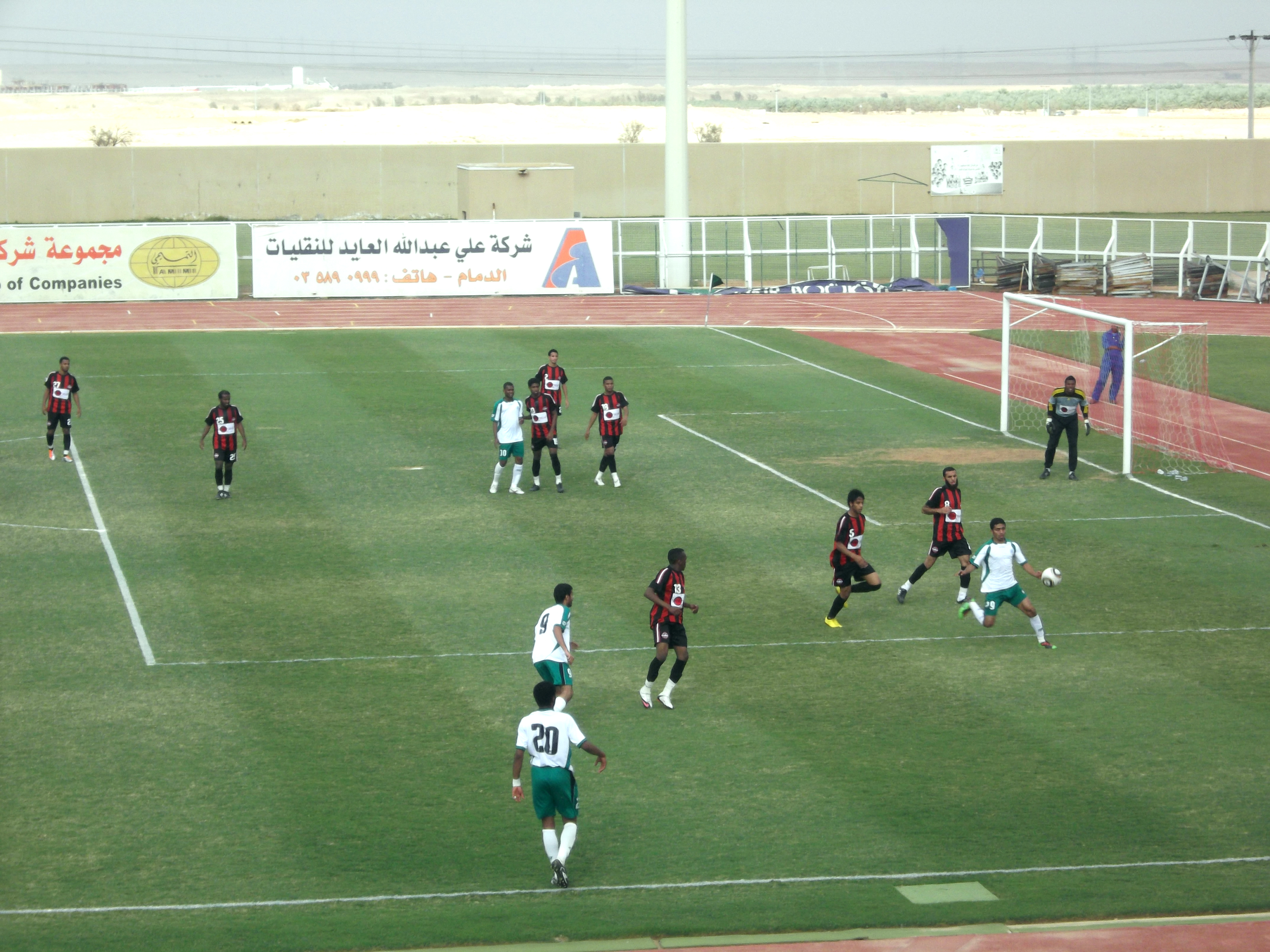
Al-Najma vs Al-Riyadh in the 2010–11 Saudi First Division season

The First Division League, originally thought to have been established in 1976, was officially recognized in 2025 as having been founded in 1957, following the findings of the 2023–2025 Saudi Arabian Football Federation (SAFF) historical documentation project. This revision aligns the league's origins with those of the Saudi Pro League, whose early development occurred in the same era.

Prior to 1976, records of Saudi football competitions were sporadic and poorly archived. In response, a national effort was undertaken to verify and document early league structures. The SAFF project uncovered evidence of organized second-tier competitions dating back to the late 1950s, which were eventually unified and formally structured into what became the First Division.

From the 2017–18 season to the 2020–21 season, the league was named in honor of Crown Prince Mohammed bin Salman.

Throughout its history, the league has served as a vital platform for club development and promotion to the top flight. Among its most successful participants, Hajer, Al-Wehda, Al-Qadsiah, and Al-Jabalain each hold four titles—the most in the league’s recorded history.

== Competition format ==
There are 18 clubs in the First Division League. During the course of a season (usually from August to May) each club plays every other club twice (a double round-robin system), once at their home stadium and once at that of their opponents, for 34 games. Teams receive three points for a win and one point for a draw. No points are awarded for a loss.

The top two teams are promoted to the Saudi Pro League directly, a play-off system to determine the third team to be promoted alongside the two. Teams placed between third and sixth position take part in the promotion play-offs. The fifth-placed would face the fourth, while the sixth-placed team would face the third. The final would be single-legged, hosted by the higher-placed team, while the bottom three teams are relegated to the Saudi Second Division League.

Each club can have a maximum of 25 players and a minimum of 16. The list can include up to 4 foreign players and 1 player born in Saudi Arabia, with the remaining players being all Saudi. Foreign goalkeepers were first allowed during the 2017–18 season. However, since the 2025–26 season, the goalkeeper position has been restricted exclusively to Saudi players.

== Current clubs ==
For details on the FD League 2025–26 season, see here.

=== Stadiums and locations ===
Locations of teams in the 2025–26 First Division League

Note: Table lists in alphabetical order.

Team	Location	Stadium	Capacity
Abha	Abha	Al-Mahalah Stadium; Damac Club Stadium (Khamis Mushait)	20,000; 5,000
Al-Adalah	Al-Ahsa	Hofuf stadium Hajer Club Stadium	26,000; 12,000
Al-Anwar	Hotat Bani Tamim	Al-Anwar Club Stadium; Al-Shoulla Club Stadium (Al-Kharj)	8,000; 8,000
Al-Arabi	Unaizah	Department of Education Stadium	10,000
Al-Batin	Hafar al-Batin	Al-Batin Club Stadium	6,000
Al-Bukiryah	Al-Bukiryah	Al-Bukiryah Club Stadium	5,000
Diriyah	Diriyah	Prince Turki bin Abdulaziz Stadium (Riyadh)	15,000
Al-Faisaly	Harmah	Al-Majma'ah Sports City Stadium (Al-Majma'ah)	7,000
Al-Jabalain	Hail	Prince Abdulaziz bin Musa'ed Sports City Stadium	12,250
Al-Jandal	Dumat al-Jandal	Al-Jawf University Stadium (Sakakah)	8,500
Al-Jubail	Jubail	Prince Nayef Sports City Stadium (Qatif); Prince Saud bin Jalawi Sports City Stadium (Khobar)	12,000; 15,000
Al-Orobah	Sakakah	Al-Jawf University Stadium; Al-Orobah Club Stadium	8,500; 7,000
Al-Raed	Buraidah	Al-Raed Club Stadium; King Abdullah Sports City Stadium Buraidah	5,000; 25,000
Al-Tai	Hail	Prince Abdulaziz bin Musa'ed Sports City Stadium	12,000
Al-Ula	al-Ula	Prince Mohammed Bin Abdulaziz Sports City (Medina)	24,000
Al-Wehda	Mecca	King Abdulaziz Sports City Stadium	38,000
Al-Zulfi	Al-Zulfi	Al-Zulfi Club Stadium	3,080
Jeddah	Jeddah	Al-Faisal Stadium; Sports Hall at King Abdullah Sports City	27,000; 1,000

== Champions ==
=== List of champions ===
#	Season	Champions	Runners-up
1	1957–58	Al-Alamein	–
2	1958–59	Al-Shatei	–
3	1959–60	Thaqeef	–
4	1960–61	Al-Kawakeb	–
5	1961–62	Nusoor Al-Hejaz	–
6	1962–63	Nusoor Al-Hejaz	–
7	1963–64	Al-Nassr	–
8	1964–65	Al-Sharq Al-Watani	–
9	1965–66	Al-Sharq Al-Watani	–
10	1966–67	Hajer	–
11	1967–68	Al-Tadamon	–
12	1968–69	Al-Jabalain	–
13	1969–70	Hajer	–
14	1970–71	Al-Jabalain	–
15	1971–72	Abha	–
16	1972–73	Al-Jabalain	–
17	1973–74	Not held	
18	1974–75	Not held	
19	1975–76	Not completed	
20	1976–77	Al-Nahda	Al-Ettifaq
21	1977–78	Al-Riyadh	Al-Tai
22	1978–79	Al-Shabab	Ohod
23	1979–80	Al-Jabalain	Al-Riyadh
24	1980–81	Ohod	Al-Rawdah
25	1981–82	Not held	
26	1982–83	Al-Wehda	Al-Riyadh
27	1983–84	Ohod	Al-Jabalain
28	1984–85	Al-Tai	Al-Kawkab
29	1985–86	Al-Ansar	Al-Raed
30	1986–87	Al-Kawkab	Ohod
31	1987–88	Hajer	Al-Rawdah
32	1988–89	Al-Riyadh	Al-Raed
33	1989–90	Al-Najma	Al-Arabi
34	1990–91	Al-Nahda	Ohod
35	1991–92	Al-Raed	Al-Najma
36	1992–93	Al-Nahda	Ohod
37	1993–94	Al-Najma	Al-Rawdah
38	1994–95	Al-Tai	Al-Taawoun
39	1995–96	Al-Wehda	Al-Ansar
40	1996–97	Al-Taawoun	Al-Shoulla
41	1997–98	Hajer	Al-Ansar
42	1998–99	Sdoos	Al-Raed
43	1999–2000	Al-Ansar	Al-Qadsiah
44	2000–01	Al-Tai	Al-Shoulla
45	2001–02	Al-Qadsiah	Al-Raed
46	2002–03	Al-Wehda	Al-Khaleej
47	2003–04	Ohod	Al-Ansar
48	2004–05	Al-Hazem	Abha
49	2005–06	Al-Khaleej	Al-Faisaly
50	2006–07	Al-Watani	Najran
51	2007–08	Al-Raed	Abha
52	2008–09	Al-Qadsiah	Al-Fateh
53	2009–10	Al-Faisaly	Al-Taawoun
54	2010–11	Hajer	Al-Ansar
55	2011–12	Al-Shoulla	Al-Wehda
56	2012–13	Al-Orobah	Al-Nahda
57	2013–14	Hajer	Al-Khaleej
58	2014–15	Al-Qadsiah	Al-Wehda
59	2015–16	Al-Ettifaq	Al-Batin
60	2016–17	Al-Fayha	Ohod
61	2017–18	Al-Wehda	Al-Hazem
62	2018–19	Abha	Damac
63	2019–20	Al-Batin	Al-Qadsiah
64	2020–21	Al-Hazem	Al-Fayha
65	2021–22	Al-Khaleej	Al-Adalah
66	2022–23	Al-Ahli	Al-Hazem
67	2023–24	Al-Qadsiah	Al-Orobah
68	2024–25	Neom	Al-Najma
69	2025–26	Abha	Al Faisaly

== Performance by club ==
Club	Titles	Winning years
Hajer	4	1966–67, 1979–80, 1987–88, 2013–14
Al-Jabalain	4	1968–69, 1970–71, 1972–73, 1979–80
Al-Wehda	4	1982–83, 1995–96, 2002–03, 2017–18
Al-Qadsiah	4	2001–02, 2008–09, 2014–15, 2023–24
Al-Nahda	3	1976–77, 1990–91, 1992–93
Al-Tai	3	1984–85, 1994–95, 2000–01
Abha	3	1971–72, 2018–19, 2025–26
Ohod	3	1980–81, 1983–84, 2003–04
Al-Riyadh	2	1977–78, 1988–89
Al-Najma	2	1989–90, 1993–94
Al-Ansar	2	1985–86, 1999–2000
Al-Raed	2	1991–92, 2007–08
Al-Hazem	2	2004–05, 2020–21
Al-Khaleej	2	2005–06, 2021–22
Al-Sharq Al-Watani	2	1964–65, 1965–66
Nusoor Al-Hejaz	2	1961–62, 1962–63
Al-Nassr	1	1963–64
Al-Shabab	1	1978–79
Al-Kawkab	1	1986–87
Al-Taawoun	1	1996–97
Sdoos	1	1998–99
Al-Watani	1	2006–07
Al-Faisaly	1	2009–10
Al-Shoulla	1	2011–12
Al-Orobah	1	2012–13
Al-Ettifaq	1	2015–16
Al-Fayha	1	2016–17
Al-Ahli	1	2022–23
Al-Batin	1	2019–20
Neom	1	2024–25
Al-Alamein	1	1957–58
Al-Shatei	1	1958–59
Thaqeef	1	1959–60
Al-Kawakeb	1	1960–61
Al-Tadamon	1	1967–68

== Top scorers ==
- Record

Season	Nat.	Top scorer(s)	Club(s)	Goals
2025–26	(Netherlands) (Nigeria)	Sylla Sow; Simy	Abha; Al-Orobah	27
2024–25	(Brazil)	Alan Cariús	Al-Adalah	20
2023–24	(Senegal)	Mbaye Diagne	Al-Qadsiah	26
2022–23	(Senegal)	Ablaye Mbengue	Al-Arabi	29
2021–22	(Madagascar)	Carolus Andria	Ohod	25
2020–21	(Ivory Coast)	Ibrahim Diomandé	Ohod	24
2019–20	(Guinea)	Ousmane Barry	Al-Bukiryah	27
2018–19	(Madagascar)	Carolus Andria	Al-Adalah	22
2017–18	(Saudi Arabia)	Mashari Al-Enezi	Al-Tai	21
2016–17	(Saudi Arabia)	Abdulfattah Adam	Al-Jeel	20
2015–16	(Saudi Arabia)	Abdulfattah Adam	Al-Jeel	20
2014–15	(Saudi Arabia)	Mousa Madkhali	Al-Wehda	20
2013–14	(Saudi Arabia)	Hamad Al-Juhaim	Al-Tai	20
2012–13	(Saudi Arabia)	Mousa Madkhali	Hetten	22
2011–12	(Saudi Arabia)	Younes Alaiwi	Al-Batin	21
2010–11	(Saudi Arabia)	Hussain Al-Turki	Al-Khaleej	20
2009–10	(Saudi Arabia)	Hussain Al-Turki	Al-Khaleej	16
2008–09	(Saudi Arabia)	Mohammad Al-Sahlawi; Mohammad Al-helo Al-Enizi	Al-Qadsiah; Sdoos	15
2007–08	(Saudi Arabia)	Khalid Al-Rejaib	Hajer	9
2006–07	(Saudi Arabia)	Al-Hasan Al-Yami	Najran	20
2005–06	(Saudi Arabia)	Mubarak Al-Khalifa	Al-Khaleej	18
2004–05	(Saudi Arabia)	Mohammed Abu Arad	Abha	19
2003–04	(Saudi Arabia)	Mohammed Abu Arad	Abha	15
2002–03	(Saudi Arabia)	Mohammed Abu Arad	Abha	16
2001–02	(Senegal)	Mohammed Manga	Sdoos	12
2000–01	(Saudi Arabia)	Mohammed Abu Arad	Abha	14
1999–00	(Saudi Arabia)	Mohammed Harshan	Najran	11
1998–99	(Saudi Arabia)	Mubarak Al-Khalifa	Al-Rawdah	13
1997–98	–	–	–	–
1996–97	(Saudi Arabia)	Mousa Sahab	Al-Taawoun	–
1995–96	(Saudi Arabia)	Obeid Al-Dosari	Al-Wehda	–
1994–95	(Senegal)	Yehey Jako	Al-Tai	11
1993–94	(Saudi Arabia)	Khalid Al-Mansour	Al-Arabi	15
1992–93	(Saudi Arabia)	Hamzah Idris	Ohod	10
1991–92	(Saudi Arabia)	Sulaiman Al-Hadaithi; Mohamed Al-Khalifa; Nasser Al-Qahtani	Al-Najma; Hajer; Al-Rawdah	11
1990–91	(Saudi Arabia)	Ahmed Al-Zaaq	Al-Taawoun	11
1989–90	(Saudi Arabia)	Khalid Al-Mansour; Hamzah Idris	Al-Arabi; Ohod	11
1988–89	(Saudi Arabia)	Khalid Al-Mansour	Al-Arabi	14
1987–88	(Saudi Arabia)	Khalid Al-Mansour; Fahd Al-Hamdan	Al-Arabi; Al-Riyadh	11
1986–87	(Saudi Arabia)	Khalid Al-Mansour	Al-Arabi	16
1985–86	(Saudi Arabia)	Abdullah Al-Saab	Al-Fayha	8
1984–85	(Saudi Arabia)	Waleed Sharqi	Al-Ansar	–
1983–84	(Saudi Arabia)	Mohamed Al-Suwaiyed	Damac	11
1982–83	(Saudi Arabia)	Shaye Al-Nafisah	Al-Kawkab	12
1980–81	(Saudi Arabia)	Abdullah Al-Mansour	Al-Taawoun	9
1979–80	(Saudi Arabia)	Daraan Al-Daraan	Al-Jabalain	16
1978–79	–	–	–	–
1977–78	–	–	–	–
1976–77	–	–	–	–

== Sponsorship ==
Sponsorship Names

- No sponsorship (1957–2011)
- Rakaa league (2012–2013)
- No sponsorship (2014–2020)
- Yelo league (2021–present)

== See also ==
- Saudi Arabian Football Federation
- Football in Saudi Arabia
- List of football clubs in Saudi Arabia
- List of football stadiums in Saudi Arabia
- Saudi Super Cup
- King's Cup
- Crown Prince Cup
- Prince Faisal bin Fahd Cup
- Saudi Founder's Cup
- Saudi Women's First Division League
- Sport in Saudi Arabia
- Saudi Arabia Ministry of Sport
