= Gainete =

Brazilian footballer and manager (born 1940)

Personal information
- Full name: Carlos Gainete Filho
- Date of birth: 15 November 1940 (age 85)
- Place of birth: Florianópolis, Brazil
- Position: Goalkeeper

Senior career*
Years	Team	Apps	(Gls)
- Paula Ramos
1960–1962	Guarany de Bagé		
1962–1964	Internacional		
1965	Vasco da Gama		
1966–1972	Internacional		
1972–1974	Atlético Paranaense		
1974	Atlético de Carazinho		

Managerial career
- 1977–1978: Internacional
- 1979: Juventude
- 1980: Campinense
- 1980: Inter-SM
- 1981: Figueirense
- 1982: São Paulo-RS
- 1983: Ceará
- 1983: Inter-SM
- 1984: Inter de Limeira
- 1985: Vitória
- 1985: XV de Piracicaba
- 1986: Vitória
- 1986–1987: Guarani
- 1988: Internacional
- 1988: Santos
- 1988–1989: Goiás
- 1989: Sport Recife
- 1990: Inter de Limeira
- 1990: Vitória
- 1991: Bahia
- 1991: São José-SP
- 1992: Goiás
- 1993–1994: Londrina
- 1995: União Bandeirante
- 1996: Ponta Grossa
- 1996: Atlético Paranaense
- 1996: Londrina
- 1999: Rio Branco-PR
- 2006: Paranavaí
- 2006: Guarani
- * Club domestic league appearances and goals

Carlos Gainete Filho (born 15 November 1940), commonly known as Gainete, is a Brazilian retired football manager and former player. He played as a goalkeeper.

Started career in 1950 years in extinct Paula Ramos. In 1960 was transferred to Guarany (Bagé)and in 1962 to Sport Club Internacional. He was played in Vasco da Gama, Atlético (PR) and Atlético Carazinho.

Gainete played for Internacional and Atlético-PR in the Campeonato Brasileiro.

== Honours ==
=== Player ===
Internacional

- Campeonato Gaúcho: 1969, 1970, 1971

=== Manager ===
Vitória

- Campeonato Baiano: 1985, 1990

Goiás

- Campeonato Goiano: 1989
