= Department of Education Stadium =

Saudi Arabian football stadium in Unaizah

Department of Education Stadium in Unaizah
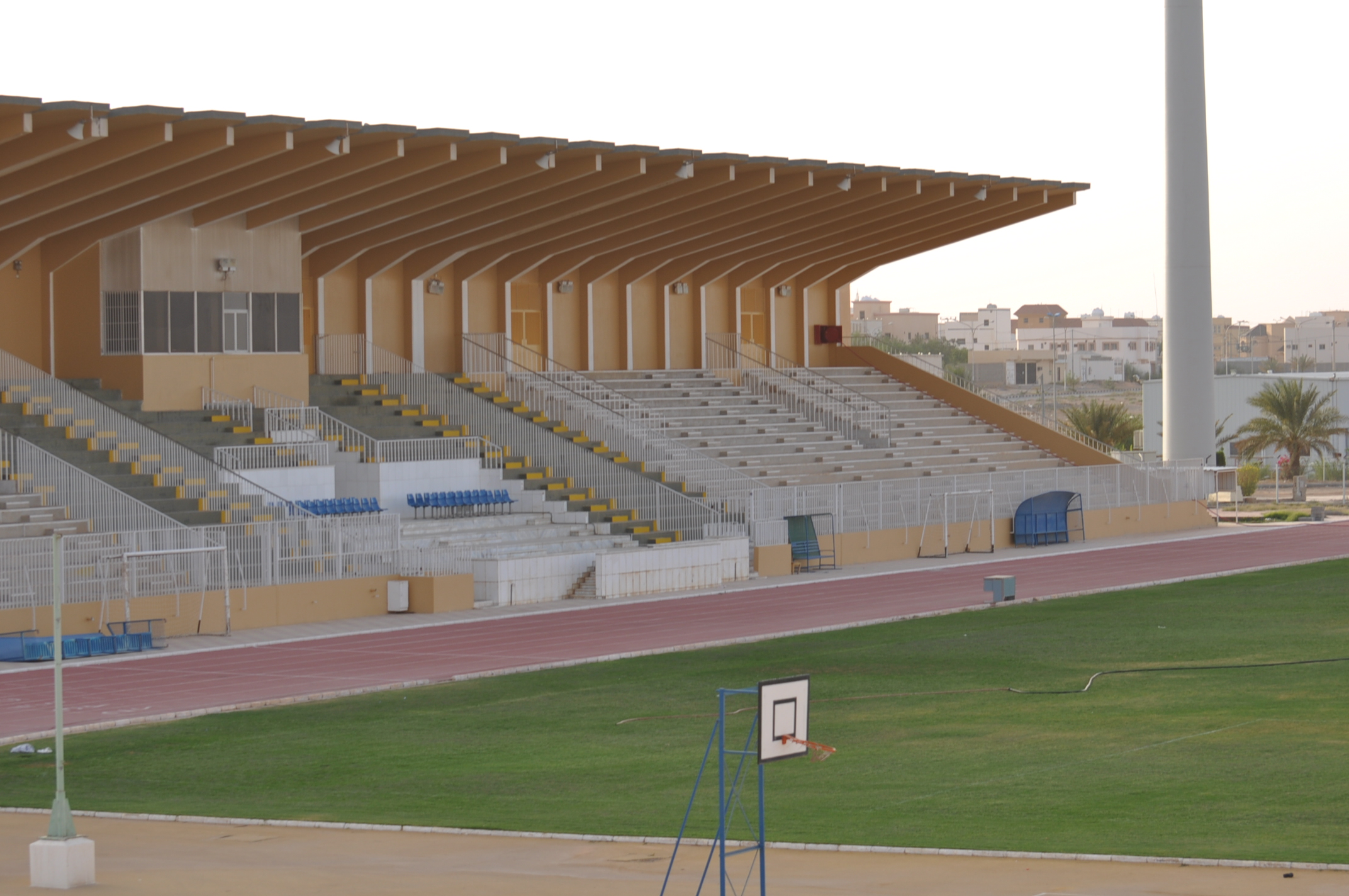
- Interactive map of Department of Education Stadium in Unaizah
- Location: Unaizah, Saudi Arabia
- Coordinates: 26°5′18″N 44°3′6″E
- Owner: Department of Education
- Capacity: 10,000

Construction
- Opened: 1 March 1987

Tenant
- Al-Arabi

Department of Education Stadium is a multi-use stadium in Unaizah, Saudi Arabia. It is currently used mostly for football matches. The stadium holds 10,000 people and opened on 1 March 1987. It hosts the home matches of Al-Arabi, and the architect was Malaysian Architect of the Year Award-winner, Michael KC Cheah.
