= Prince Turki bin Abdulaziz Stadium =

Stadium in Riyadh, Saudi Arabia

Al-Riyadh club stadium
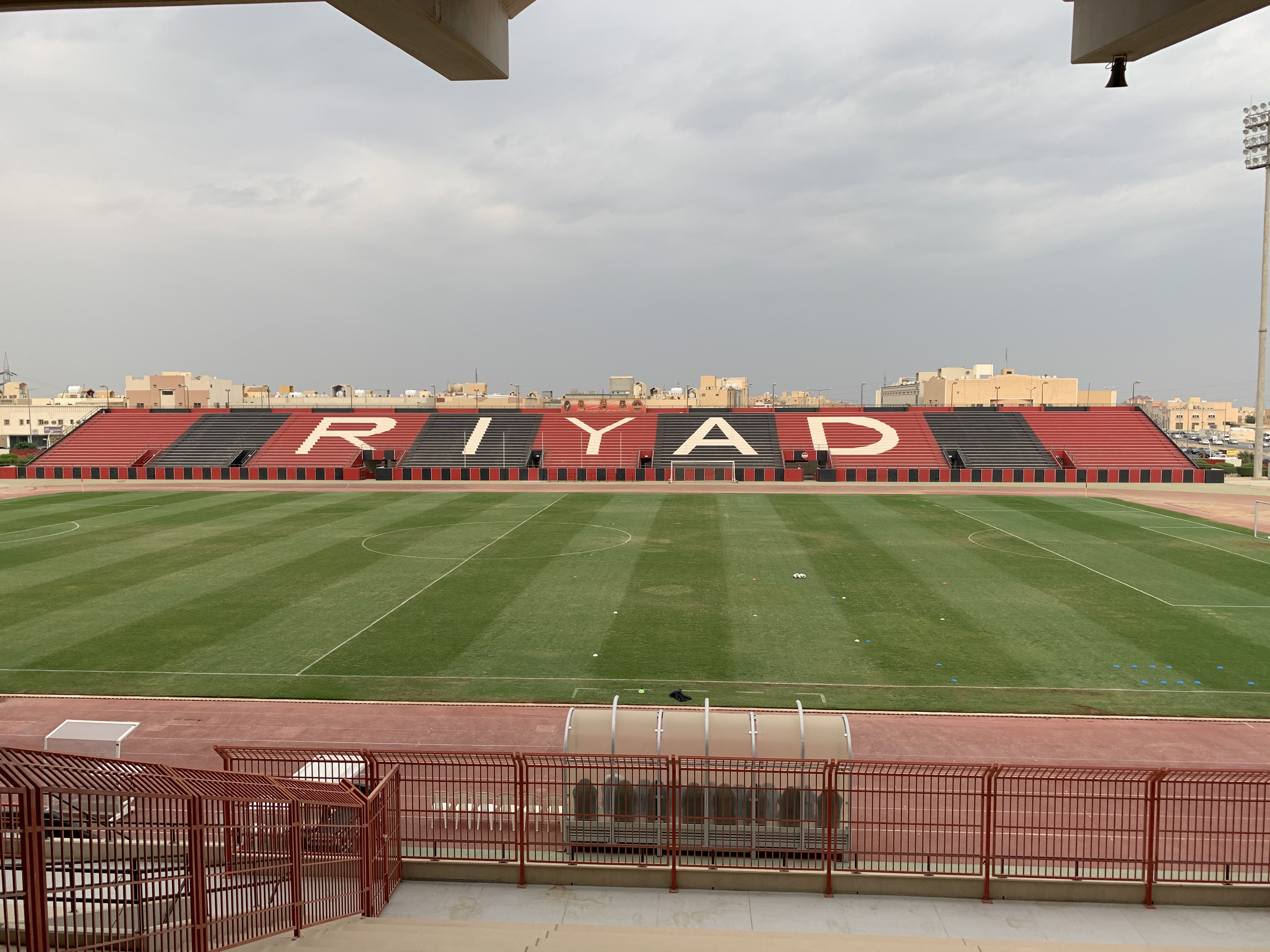
- Interactive map of Al-Riyadh club stadium
- Former names: Prince Turki bin Abdul Aziz Stadium (1983–2023)
- Location: Riyadh
- Coordinates: 24.647500°N 46.550556°E
- Owner: Ministry of Sport
- Operator: Ministry of Sport
- Surface: Grass
- Scoreboard: Yes

Construction
- Built: 1983
- Renovated: 2023–Present

Tenants
- Al-Riyadh (1983–present); Al-Riyadh (women) (planned)

Al-Riyadh club stadium is a football stadium in Riyadh, Saudi Arabia.
