= Al Raed S.FC =

Association football club in Saudi Arabia

Al Raed
- Full name: Al Raed Saudi Football Club
- Nickname: Raed Al Tahadi
- Founded: 1954; 72 years ago
- Ground: King Abdullah Sport City Stadium, Buraidah, Saudi Arabia
- Capacity: 25,000
- Chairman: Fahad Al-Motawa'a
- Head coach: Reda Hakam
- League: Saudi First Division
- 2025–26: 7th of 18
- Website: alraedclub.sa
Home colours	Away colours	Third colours

Al Raed Saudi Football Club (Arabic: نادي الرائد Nādī ar-Rāʾid; lit. 'Pioneer Club') is a Saudi football club based in Buraidah, and the first of its kind in the Qassim region of Saudi Arabia. One of the club's notable founders is Abdulaziz Al-Aboudi. Established in 1954, Al Raed have played in the Saudi Pro League, the top division of Saudi football, since 2008 until 2025 when they got relegated.

== History ==
The team was able to qualify for the Premier League Saudi Arabia in 1980–1981. It met Club K in the qualifiers held in Riyadh. In 1986, it was the first team from the Qassim region to enter the Saudi Premier League. The team repeated this ascension to the Premier League at the end of 1989, 1992, 1998, 2002 and 2007. The junior team reached the Saudi Premier League clubs for juniors in 1999, and in 2003.

Al-Raed FC has had varied performances in the King’s Cup over recent seasons. Here’s an overview:

2021–2022 Season: Round of 16: Al-Raed was eliminated by Al-Hilal.

2022–2023 Season: Round of 16: Al-Raed faced Al-Nassr and was knocked out after a 3-0 defeat.

2023–2024 Season: Round of 32: Al-Raed was eliminated by Al-Najma.

2024–2025 Season: Quarter-Finals: Al-Raed progressed to the quarter-finals, defeating Al-Jabalain.

This progression to the quarter-finals in the 2024–2025 season marks an improvement compared to previous seasons, indicating a positive trajectory in Al-Raed’s King’s Cup performances.

== Stadium ==
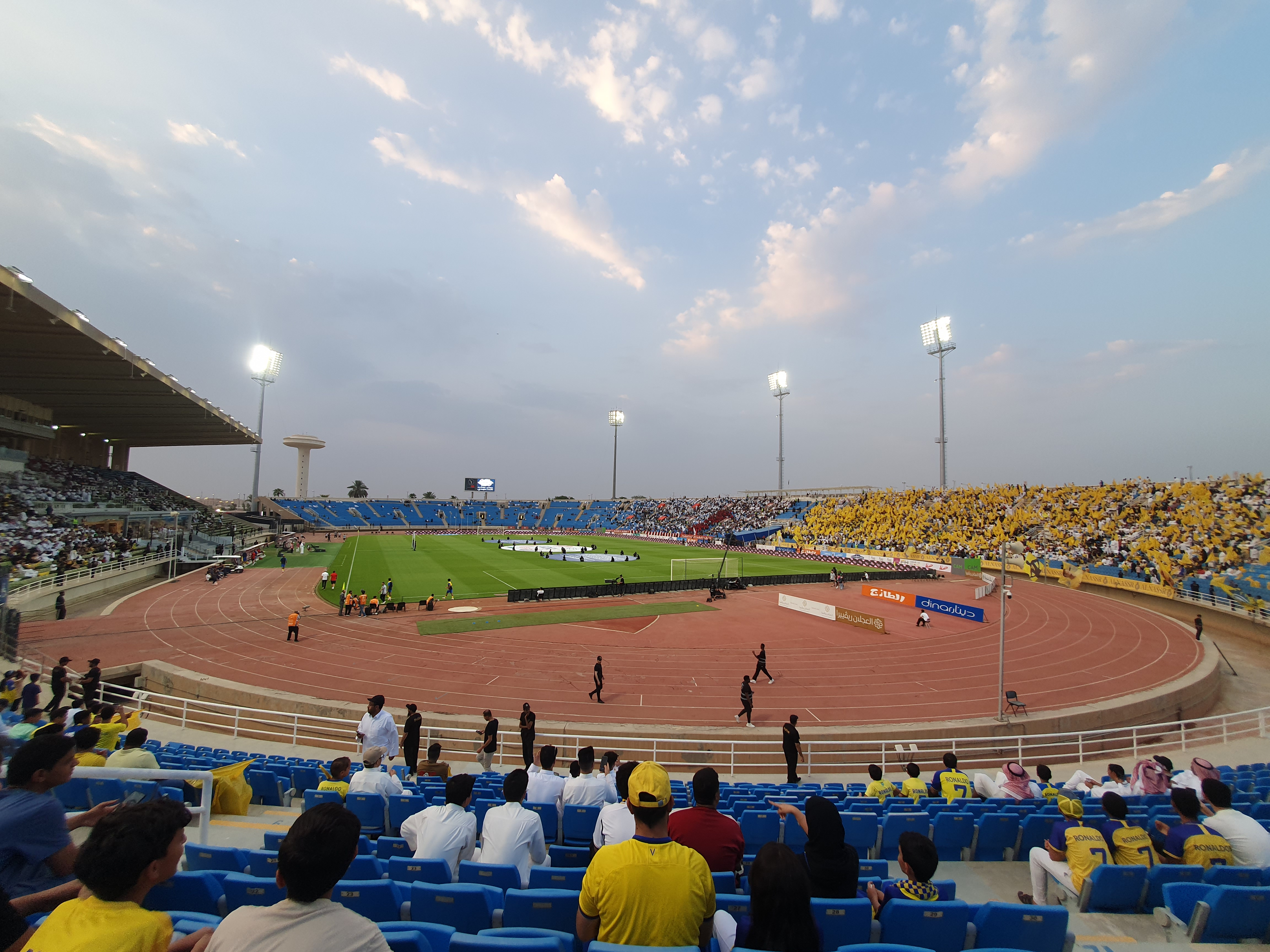
King Abdullah Sports City, the home ground of Al-Raed

The club play their home games at King Abdullah Sports City in Buraidah. They share the stadium with rivals Al-Taawoun, with whom they contest the Al-Qassim derby.

== Honours ==
- Saudi First Division League
  - Winners (2): 1991–92, 2007–08
  - Runners-up (4): 1985–86, 1988–89, 1998–99, 2001–02

== Current squad ==
As of January 2025

Note: Flags indicate national team as defined under FIFA eligibility rules; some limited exceptions apply. Players may hold more than one non-FIFA nationality.

No.	Pos.	Nation	Player
2	DF	KSA	Tamim Al-Shuqayran
3	DF	KSA	Munif Doshi
4	DF	KSA	Bandar Al-Shamrani
5	MF	LBR	Salomon Tweh
6	MF	KSA	Yousef Al-Harbi
7	FW	TOG	Khaled Narey
8	MF	KSA	Omar Shami
9	FW	SEN	Moussa Koné
10	MF	KSA	Saad Al-Selouli
11	MF	KSA	Mohammed Al-Sufyani
12	DF	KSA	Hassan Al-Asmari
13	DF	MAR	Redouane Mennioui
14	DF	KSA	Abdullah Badghaish
16	MF	KSA	Meshari Al-Oufi
18	MF	KSA	Ayman Al-Balawi

No.	Pos.	Nation	Player
20	FW	KSA	Hamoud Al-Shammari
21	MF	KSA	Mohammed Al-Hussain
22	GK	KSA	Feras Al-Rajhi
24	DF	KSA	Badr Al-Shardi
28	DF	KSA	Abdulaziz Mudabish
33	DF	KSA	Ziyad Al-Refaei
38	DF	KSA	Mohammed Dakhilallah (on loan from Neom)
40	MF	KSA	Abdullah Al-Harbi
74	GK	KSA	Mohammed Al-Khaibari
77	MF	KSA	Nawaf Hazazi
79	MF	CIV	Claude Gnolou (on loan from KACM)
87	DF	KSA	Abdulrahman Sahhari
88	GK	KSA	Mohammed Al-Otaibi
94	MF	KSA	Maher Al-Khowailed
—	GK	KSA	Raed Ozaybi

== Management staff ==
Position	Staff
Head coach	(Morocco) Reda Hakam
Assistant coach	(Morocco) Alaa El Alami
Goalkeeper coach	(Morocco) Nasr El-Din Ziad
Fitness coach	(Saudi Arabia) Abdulrahman Al-Mubarak
Match analyst	(Saudi Arabia) Khaled Al-Humairi
Physiotherapist	(Morocco) Badr El-Ismaili

== Managers ==
- (Egypt) El-Sayed El-Attiyah (1980–81)
- (Egypt) Anwar Salama (August 1, 1984 – February 1, 1985)
- (Saudi Arabia) Saleh Al-Suhail (February 1, 1985 – May 30, 1986)
- (Socialist Federal Republic of Yugoslavia) Ljubiša Broćić (July 1, 1986 – September 27, 1986)
- (Saudi Arabia) Saleh Al-Suhail (September 27, 1986 – June 30, 1987)
- (Brazil) Joel Castro (1990–91)
- (Egypt) Mahmoud El-Khawaga (1991)
- (Brazil) China (1998–99)
- (Brazil) Aderbal Lana (1992–94)
- (Bosnia and Herzegovina) Senad Kreso (July 1, 2000 – November 25, 2000)
- (Brazil) Marco Cunha (November 25, 2000 – February 13, 2001)
- (Brazil) China (February 13, 2001 – January 7, 2002)
- (Saudi Arabia) Abdulaziz Al-Owdah (January 15, 2002 – May 1, 2002)
- (Brazil) José Fernandes (July 1, 2002 – September 22, 2002)
- (Egypt) Hani El Antabli (caretaker) (September 22, 2002 – October 24, 2002)
- (Brazil) Gainete (October 24, 2002 – December 28, 2002)
- (Saudi Arabia) Yousef Khamees (December 28, 2002 – April 27, 2003)
- (Egypt) Hani El Antabli (caretaker) (April 27, 2003 – October 8, 2003)
- (Romania) Viorel Kraus (October 8, 2003 – January 30, 2004)
- (Saudi Arabia) Abdulaziz Al-Owdah (February 4, 2004 – February 13, 2004)
- (Egypt) Hani El Antabli (caretaker) (February 13, 2004 – February 25, 2004)
- (Saudi Arabia) Khalil Al-Masri (February 25, 2004 – May 1, 2004)
- (Brazil) Luís Freire (July 10, 2004 – March 21, 2005)
- (Saudi Arabia) Abdulaziz Al-Owdah (March 21, 2005 – April 24, 2005)
- (Saudi Arabia) Mohammed Al-Nodali (caretaker) (April 24, 2005 – September 1, 2005)
- (Egypt) Aboud El Khodary (September 1, 2005 – November 14, 2005)
- (Saudi Arabia) Khalil Al-Masri (November 17, 2005 – February 12, 2006)
- (Saudi Arabia) Khalid Al-Koroni (February 12, 2006 – May 1, 2006)
- (Tunisia) Mohammed Aldo (May 4, 2006 – December 21, 2008)
- (Brazil) Luís Antônio Zaluar (December 29, 2008 – June 1, 2009)
- (Portugal) Acácio Casimiro (June 21, 2009 – October 4, 2009)
- (Brazil) Edison Mario Souza (October 4, 2009 – May 30, 2010)
- (Brazil) Lucho Nizzo (July 15, 2010 – November 7, 2010)
- (Portugal) Eurico Gomes (November 7, 2010 – October 17, 2011)
- (Tunisia) Hafez Al-Hoarbi (caretaker) (October 17, 2011 – October 28, 2011)
- (Tunisia) Ammar Souayah (October 28, 2011 – February 1, 2013)
- (North Macedonia) Vlatko Kostov (February 2, 2013 – June 1, 2013)
- (Algeria) Noureddine Zekri (June 26, 2013 – February 14, 2014)
- (Tunisia) Emad Al-Sulami (caretaker) (February 14, 2014 – March 2, 2014)
- (Belgium) Marc Brys (March 2, 2014 – May 1, 2014)
- (North Macedonia) Vlatko Kostov (May 31, 2014 – September 1, 2014)
- (Tunisia) Emad Al-Sulami (caretaker) (September 1, 2014 – October 7, 2014)
- (Belgium) Marc Brys (October 7, 2014 – March 24, 2015)
- (Tunisia) Ammar Souayah (March 24, 2015 – May 19, 2015)
- (Algeria) Abdelkader Amrani (June 8, 2015 – August 29, 2015)
- (Greece) Takis Lemonis (September 3, 2015 – February 1, 2016)
- (Morocco) Reda Hakam (caretaker) (February 1, 2016 – February 4, 2016)
- (Serbia) Aleksandar Ilić (February 4, 2016 – June 17, 2016)
- (Tunisia) Nacif Beyaoui (June 17, 2016 – May 14, 2017)
- (Algeria) Taoufik Rouabah (June 4, 2017 – October 1, 2017)
- (Romania) Ciprian Panait (October 4, 2017 – February 5, 2018)
- (Serbia) Aleksandar Ilić (February 5, 2018 – June 1, 2018)
- (Albania) Besnik Hasi (July 26, 2018 – June 1, 2021)
- (Spain) Pablo Machín (June 19, 2021 – January 26, 2022)
- (Portugal) João Pedro Sousa (January 26, 2022 – May 24, 2022)
- (Saudi Arabia) Yousef Al-Ghadeer (June 6, 2022 – June 28, 2022)
- (Romania) Marius Șumudică (June 30, 2022 – June 1, 2023)
- (Croatia) Igor Jovićević (July 9, 2023 – June 1, 2024)
- (Brazil) Odair Hellmann (July 14, 2024 – April 1, 2025)
- (Croatia) Krešimir Režić (April 1, 2025 – June 1, 2025)
- (Portugal) Jorge Mendonça (September 4, 2025 – February 5, 2026)
- (Palestine) Rami El Hassan (caretaker) (February 5, 2026 – February 18, 2026)
- (Tunisia) Nacif Beyaoui (February 18, 2026 – )

== See also ==
- List of football clubs in Saudi Arabia
