= Al-Nahda Club (Saudi Arabia) =

Association football club in Saudi Arabia

Al-Nahda
- Full name: Al-Nahda Saudi Club
- Founded: 1949; 77 years ago
- Ground: Prince Mohamed bin Fahd Stadium, Dammam
- Capacity: 26,000
- Chairman: Tariq Al-Hubaishi
- Manager: Redha Al-Janby
- League: Third Division
- 2024–25: Third Division, 5th of 10
Home colours	Away colours

Al Nahda (Arabic: نادي النهضة) is a Saudi football club based in the city of Dammam, Eastern province. Established in 1949, they currently play in the Saudi First Division, which is the second tier of the Saudi football league system.

In the 2007–08 season, under the lead of the Croatian coach Dragan Talajić, Al Nahda played the finals of the Prince Faisal Cup, being the first team from the Saudi Second League to play in the final.

== Honours ==
- Saudi First Division League
  - Winners (3): 1976–77, 1990–91, 1992–93
  - Runners-up (1): 2012–13
- Saudi Second Division League
  - Winners (2): 1997–98, 2010–11
  - Runners-up (1): 2005–06
- Prince Faisal bin Fahd Cup for Division 1 and 2 Teams
  - Winners (2): 1992–93, 1995–96
  - Runners-up (1): 2007–08

== Current squad ==
As of Saudi Third Division:

Note: Flags indicate national team as defined under FIFA eligibility rules; some limited exceptions apply. Players may hold more than one non-FIFA nationality.

No.	Pos.	Nation	Player
1	GK	KSA	Sultan Al-Shammari
3	DF	KSA	Ayel Haqawi
7	MF	KSA	Marzouq Al-Dossari
8	FW	KSA	Hussain Al-Zahrah
9	FW	KSA	Meshal Al-Koumi
11	MF	KSA	Abdulrahman Al-Bishi
12	MF	KSA	Mohammed Al-Meqbali
15	MF	KSA	Hamad Al-Shehri
17	FW	KSA	Zamel Al-Harbi
19	DF	KSA	Meshal Al-Hussain

No.	Pos.	Nation	Player
22	GK	KSA	Mahdi Al-Alwi
23	GK	KSA	Kadhem Al-Asfoor
24	DF	KSA	Ali Al-Abdulateef
30	DF	KSA	Khaled Al-Maghrabi
73	DF	KSA	Anwar Al-Shebib
87	DF	KSA	Fares Al-Khaibari
88	MF	KSA	Thunayan Al-Shammari
95	FW	KSA	Ahmed Al-Dawagh
99	DF	KSA	Saoud Al-Tlasi
—	FW	KSA	Sultan Hawsawi

== Managers ==
- (Croatia) Dragan Talajić (2007–09)
- (Egypt) Bahaa Aldeen Al-Qebisi (2011)
- (Tunisia) Jalel Kadri (2012–13)
- (Romania) Ilie Balaci (June 4, 2013 – Sept 24, 2013)
- (Tunisia) Jalal Qaderi (2013–14)
- (Saudi Arabia) Sameer Hilal (2014–2016)
- (Croatia) Mladen Frančić (2016)

== See also ==
- List of football clubs in Saudi Arabia
