= Al-Rawdah Club =

Association football club in Saudi Arabia

Al-Rawdah
- Full name: Al-Rawdah Club
- Founded: 1976
- Ground: Prince Abdullah bin Jalawi Stadium; Al-Hasa, Saudi Arabia
- Capacity: 20,000
- Chairman: Mubarak Al-Maeweed
- Manager: Fathi Ouhaibi
- League: Saudi Second Division
- 2024-25: Saudi Second Division, 6th (Group B)
Home colours	Away colours

Al-Rawdah Club is a Saudi Arabian football team based in Al-Jeshah, competing in the Saudi Second Division League.

== Honours ==
Saudi First Division League

- Runners-up (2): 1980–81, 1987–88

== Stadium ==
Currently the team plays at the 20,000-capacity Prince Abdullah bin Jalawi Stadium in Hofuf.

== Current squad ==
As of Saudi Second Division:

Note: Flags indicate national team as defined under FIFA eligibility rules; some limited exceptions apply. Players may hold more than one non-FIFA nationality.

No.	Pos.	Nation	Player
4	DF	MAR	Omar Kouar
7	MF	KSA	Nawaf Sharahili
10	MF	MAR	Youssef El Barraqui
11	FW	KSA	Ahmed Al-Shammari
13	DF	KSA	Abdulelah Al-Ghallab
14	MF	MTN	Babacar Diop
19	FW	KSA	Salman Al-Qahtani
22	GK	KSA	Jaber Al-Shafei
26	FW	NGR	Israel Abia
28	MF	KSA	Yousef Al-Ohaymid
29	DF	KSA	Ramzi Al-Muwallad
33	GK	KSA	Ali Al-Waw
38	DF	KSA	Sultan Al-Sulayli

No.	Pos.	Nation	Player
39	FW	KSA	Hamad Al-Turki
45	MF	KSA	Naif Bakri
49	MF	KSA	Majed Al-Hantoushi
55	DF	KSA	Omar Mohammed
66	MF	KSA	Aiedh Al-Shaheen
70	MF	KSA	Abdulrahman Al-Qarni
74	MF	KSA	Hassan Al-Qattan
77	DF	KSA	Khaled Al-Qahtani
79	FW	KSA	Nawaf Al-Abood
94	DF	KSA	Faisal Al-Rasheed
97	FW	KSA	Alzubayer Al-Hayem
—	MF	NGR	Godwin Odibo
—	MF	KSA	Khaled Maddad
—	MF	TUN	Mohamed Ali Hosni
—	FW	TUN	Alaeddine Marzouki

== Notable players ==
- Jassem Al-Hamdan
- Ahmed Al-Nadhri
- Hussain Al-Showaish

== See also ==
- List of football clubs in Saudi Arabia
