= Al-Arabi SC (Saudi Arabia) =

Association football club in Saudi Arabia

Coordinates: 26°3′51″N 43°59′48″E

Al-Arabi
- Full name: Al-Arabi Sports Club
- Nickname: Fares Unaizah (The Knight of Unaizah)
- Founded: 1958; 68 years ago
- Ground: Department of Education Stadium; Unaizah, Saudi Arabia
- Capacity: 10,000
- Chairman: Ameen Al-Malah
- Manager: Kiko López
- League: First Division League
- 2025–26: FDL, 17th of 18
- Website: alarabisc.sa
Home colours

Al-Arabi Sports Club (Arabic: نادي العربي), also known as Al-Arabi Al-Saudi, is a professional multi-sports club based in Unaizah, Saudi Arabia. The football team competes in the Saudi First Division League, the second tier of Saudi football.

== History ==
=== Establishment ===
Al Arabi Sporting Club was formed in Unaizah in 1958, by a group of young people in the city. The club operated unofficially as an amateur club until 1967 and was registered officially in the same year when General Presidency of Youth Welfare Abdulrahman Al-N'aim officially took over. The club has had fourteen presidents from its establishment until 2010, Currently, Adeeb Al-Kwiter is the president.

== Football ==
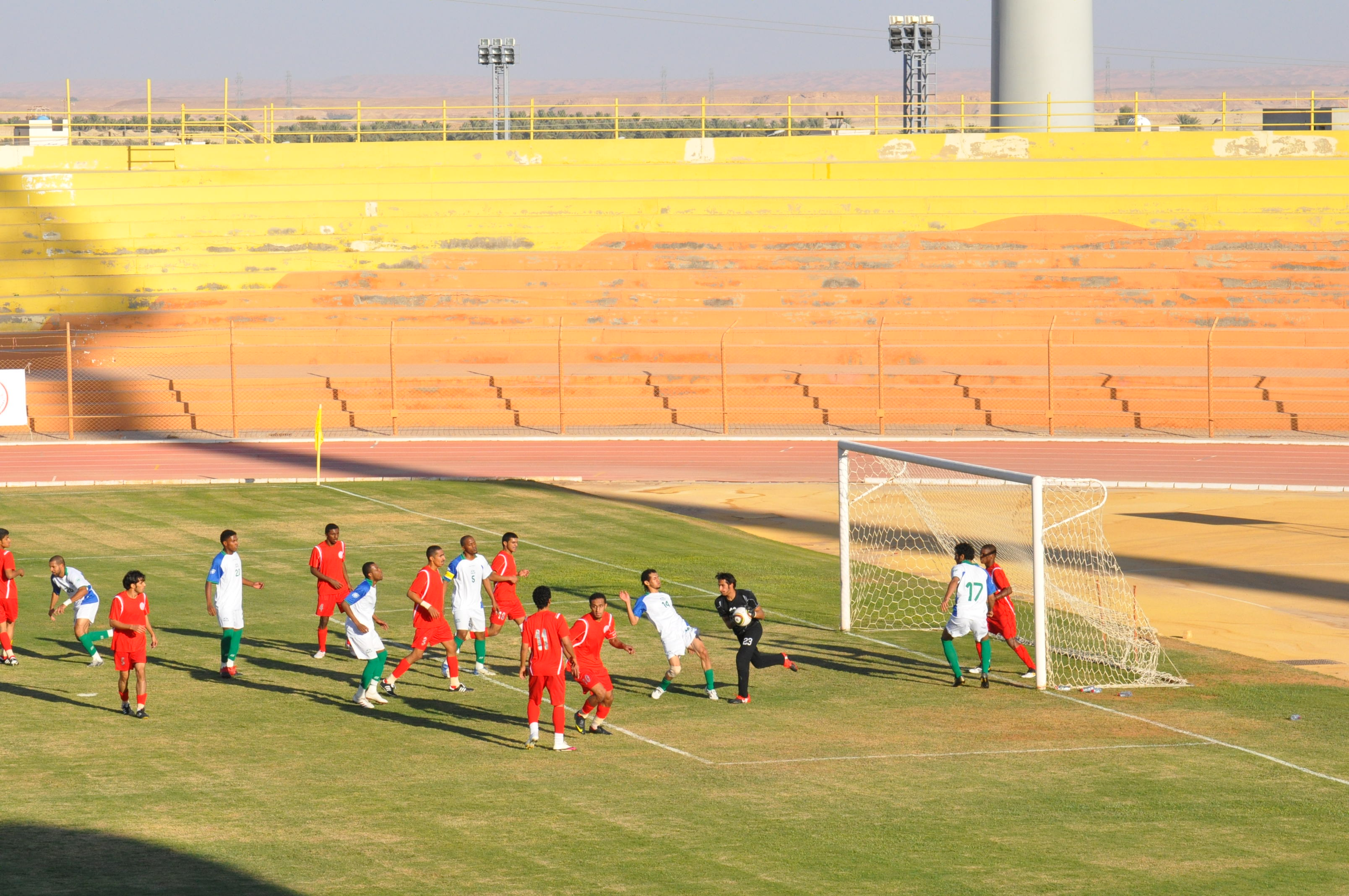
Match between the Al-Arabi and Sdoos in Saudi Division 2.

Al-Arabi played for the first time in the Saudi First Division in the 1986–87 season. However, It played for four seasons until it won the Saudi First Division in 1989–90 season and was promoted to the Saudi Premier League. The club played one season in the Saudi Premier League and then was relegated to the Saudi First Division, where they played for four years. Al-Arabi was relegated in 1994–95 to the Saudi Second Division and attempted to rise back to the Saudi First Division in the 1995–96 season. Al-Arabi lost in the qualifier finals which was held in Al-Hasa. They played the 1996–97 and the 1997–98 season in the second division, until they were relegated to the third division in the 1998–99 season. The club continued in the third division until managing to qualify in 2001–02 in the final qualification match which was held in Najran and was promoted. The team played in the second division for from the 2002–03 season until the 2004–05 season where it was once again to the third division. Al-Arabi returned to the Saudi Second Division in the 2008–09 season after getting second place in the final qualification which was held in Dammam. In the 2021–22 season, they were champions of the Saudi Second Division and was promoted in the Saudi First Division. They have been playing in that division since the 2022–23 season.

- 1 season in Saudi Professional League
- 8 seasons in Saudi First Division
- 18 seasons in Saudi Second Division
- 7 seasons in Saudi Third Division

== Current squad ==
As of 1 July 2023:

Note: Flags indicate national team as defined under FIFA eligibility rules; some limited exceptions apply. Players may hold more than one non-FIFA nationality.

| No. | Pos. | Nation | Player |
|---|---|---|---|
| — | GK | KSA | Meshal Hariss |
| — | GK | KSA | Abdulmalik Al-Duwaisan |
| — | GK | KSA | Melfi Al-Rashidi |
| — | GK | KSA | Abdullah Al-Nakhli |
| — | DF | BRA | Conceisao dos Santos |
| — | DF | KSA | Abdulrahman Al-Masoudi |
| — | DF | KSA | Abdulmohsen Fallatah |
| — | DF | KSA | Naif Fawaz |
| — | DF | KSA | Yasser Al-Salhi |
| — | DF | KSA | Faisal Al-Otaibi |
| — | DF | KSA | Thamer Al-Johani |
| — | MF | KSA | Sulaiman Al-Nakhli |
| — | MF | BRA | Sabino |

| No. | Pos. | Nation | Player |
|---|---|---|---|
| — | MF | KSA | Salman Al-Wahabi |
| — | MF | KSA | Rayan Al-Hunaidi |
| — | MF | KSA | Basil Al-Hassan |
| — | MF | KSA | Fahad Al-Marwani |
| — | MF | KSA | Ayman Al-Sahli |
| — | MF | KSA | Mohammed Fraih |
| — | MF | KSA | Nader Al-Muwallad |
| — | MF | KSA | Osama Al-Dubaisi |
| — | FW | KSA | Wesam Wahib |
| — | FW | BRA | Abner Vinicius |
| — | FW | BRA | Vinícius Araújo |
| — | FW | KSA | Ali Hajjas |

== Club honours (Football) ==
- Saudi First Division :
  - Runner up (1) : 1989–90
- Saudi Second Division :
  - Champion (2) : 1986–87, 2021–22
- Saudi Third Division :
  - Champion (1) : 2001–02

=== Current technical staff ===
| Position | Name |
|---|---|
| Head coach | (Spain) Kiko López |
| Assistant coach | (Saudi Arabia) Mohammed Al-Duaiji |
| Goalkeeping Coach | (Algeria) Abdali Al-Aoaqbi |
| Under-17-team Coach | (Egypt) Abdulaziz Ibrahim |
| Under-14-team Coach | (Egypt) Tariq Sharif |
| Goalkeeping Coach-Youth system | (Egypt) Tarek Atia |
| Head of Medical | (Egypt) Mahmoud Karim |

=== Coaches history ===
- (Iraq) Akram Ahmad Salman 1989–1992
- (Algeria) Wardi Murad 2010–2011
- (Croatia) Zdravko Logarusic 2023
- (Croatia) Alen Horvat 2023–present

== Basketball ==
=== Club honours (Basketball) ===
- Saudi Basketball U-17 tournament: 1

1997

== Club honours (Hand Ball) ==
- Saudi Federation Handball Cup: 1

1983

- Saudi Youth Handball Tournament: 1

1977

- Saudi Handball U-17 Premier League: 1

2009

== Stadium ==
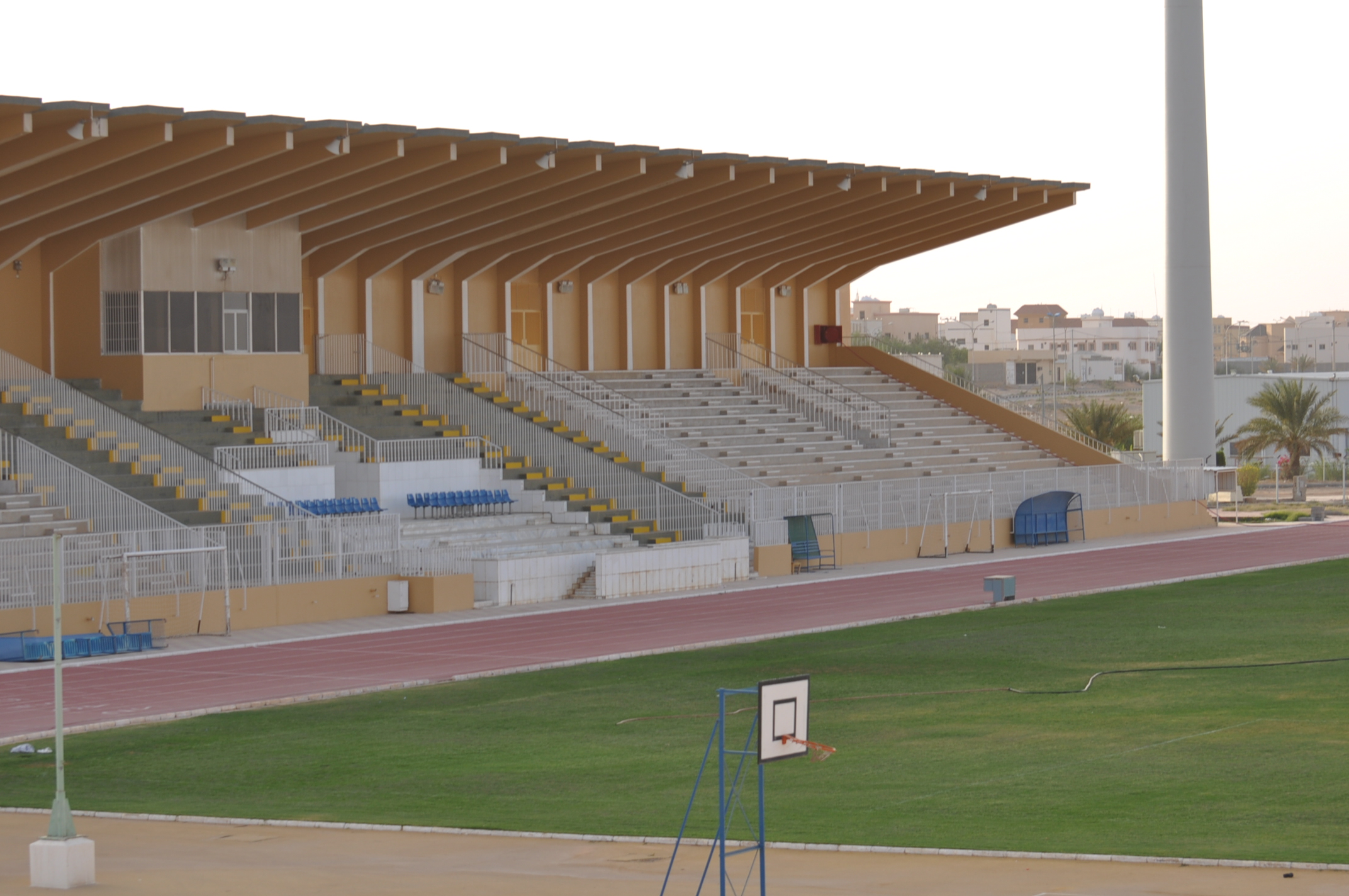
Department of Education Stadium in Unaizah.

Al-Arabi does not have its own football stadium, and uses a playground for training. A sport compound was built in Unaizah with facilities for a wide range of competitive sports, and the General Presidency of Youth Welfare decided to hold a draw between the city's two clubs for the right to use it. Al-Najma SC gained the right to use the stadium without a draw. In February 2007 during an interview on a program called C.V., Saleh Al-Wassel, the then-president of Al-Najma, admitted that he used his influence to obtain the newly built sports facility in Unaizah.

Al Arabi is currently playing all of its home matches at the Department of Education Stadium.

== Indoor facilities ==
Al-Arabi Pavilion is an indoor sports arena used particularly for basketball and handball matches for the club. The capacity of the stadium is 7,000 people, and was built in 2007.

== Presidents ==
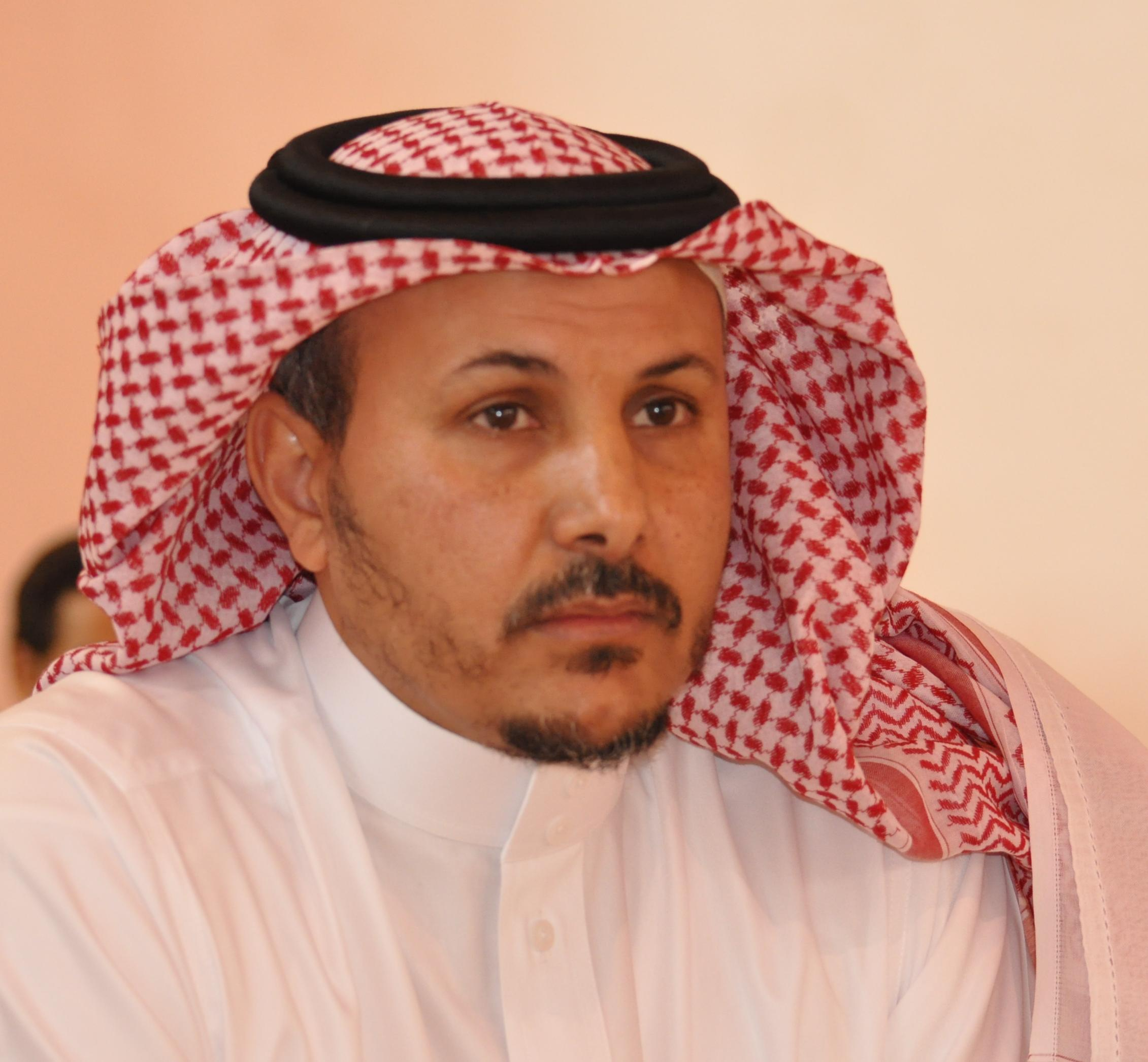
Adeeb Al-Kwiter Current club president.

- (Saudi Arabia) Suleiman Al-Badi
- (Saudi Arabia) Abdulrahman Al-Naim
- (Saudi Arabia) Ahmed Al-Turki
- (Saudi Arabia) Mohammed Al-Manea
- (Saudi Arabia) Ibrahim Al-Zaki
- (Saudi Arabia) Abdulrahman Al-Musaed
- (Saudi Arabia) Ahmad Al-Mansur
- (Saudi Arabia) Fahad Al-Wahaibi
- (Saudi Arabia) Ahmad Al-Subaie
- (Saudi Arabia) Ahmed Al-Marzouq
- (Saudi Arabia) Adeeb Al-Kwiter
- (Saudi Arabia) Mohammed Al-Dukahil
- (Saudi Arabia) Abdulaziz Al Dera
- (Saudi Arabia) Ameen Al Malah

== See also ==
- List of football clubs in Saudi Arabia
