= Al-Watani Club =

Association football club in Saudi Arabia

Al Watani Football Club
- Full name: Al-Watani
- Nickname: The Purple Crown
- Founded: 1959; 67 years ago
- Ground: King Khalid Sport City Stadium; Tabuk, Saudi Arabia
- Capacity: 5,000
- Chairman: Nayef Awad al-Balawi
- League: Saudi First Division
Home colours	Away colours

Al-Watani (Arabic: الوطني) is a Saudi Arabian football team based in Tabuk. The club was established in 1959. The club currently plays in the Saudi Third Division.

Al-Watani has achieved promotion to the Saudi Premier League as the champion of the Saudi First Division during the 2006–07 season.

== Honours ==
- Saudi First Division (Level 2)
  - Winners (1): 2006–07
- Saudi Third Division (Level 4)
  - Winners (1): 2002–03

== Current squad ==
Note: Flags indicate national team as defined under FIFA eligibility rules; some limited exceptions apply. Players may hold more than one non-FIFA nationality.

No.	Pos.	Nation	Player
1	GK	KSA	Abdulaziz Al-Balawi
4	DF	KSA	Abdullah Al-Khaibari
5	DF	KSA	Abdulrahman Qahil
6	DF	KSA	Basil Al-Shammari
7	FW	KSA	Naif Al-Qahtani
8	MF	KSA	Abdullah Al-Harbi
9	FW	KSA	Yazeed Al-Balawi
10	MF	KSA	Abdulaziz Sharifi
11	MF	KSA	Majed Al-Balawi
12	DF	KSA	Anwar Al-Ghamdi
13	DF	KSA	Hassan Al-Qahtani
14	MF	KSA	Muteb Al-Obaid

No.	Pos.	Nation	Player
15	MF	KSA	Fahad Al-Rashidi
16	MF	KSA	Abdulrahman Al-Lahbi
17	FW	KSA	Ali Mutair
22	MF	KSA	Abdulmajeed Al-Enezi
26	GK	KSA	Ahmed Al-Atwi
27	FW	KSA	Mutaz Gharwi
33	GK	KSA	Abdullah Al-Shehri
44	DF	KSA	Faiz Al-Balawi
75	MF	KSA	Mohammed Harzan
77	MF	KSA	Abdulaziz Al-Balawi
—	GK	KSA	Ayman Al-Hussaini
—	DF	KSA	Badr Al-Bishi
—	MF	KSA	Sultan Al-Sawadi

== See also ==
- List of football clubs in Saudi Arabia
