= Al-Ansar FC (Saudi Arabia) =

Association football club in Saudi Arabia

Al-Ansar
- Full name: Al-Ansar Football Club
- Founded: 1966; 60 years ago
- Ground: Al-Ansar Club Stadium; Medina, Saudi Arabia
- Capacity: 5,000
- Owner: ABASCO
- Manager: Saleh Al-Mohamadi
- League: Second Division
- 2024-25: Saudi Second Division, 16th of 16th (relegated)
Home colours	Away colours	Third colours

Al-Ansar Football Club (Arabic: نادي الأنصار) is a Saudi Arabian professional multi-sports club based in Medina that plays in the Saudi Second Division, the third tier of Saudi football. It was founded in 1953. The club play their home games at the Al-Ansar Club Stadium in Medina. Al-Ansar have a rivalry with city neighbors Ohod, and the two sides contest the Medina derby.

== Honours ==
- Saudi First Division League
  - Winners (2): 1985–86, 1999–2000
  - Runners-up (4): 1995–96, 1997–98, 2003–04, 2010–11

== Personnel ==
=== Current technical staff ===
Position	Name
Manager	(Egypt) Sherif El-Khashab
Technical Assistant	(Saudi Arabia) Bandar Al Ahmadi
Assistant Manager	
Fitness Coach	
Goalkeeping Coach	
Physiotherapist	

== Current squad ==
As of Saudi Second Division:

Note: Flags indicate national team as defined under FIFA eligibility rules; some limited exceptions apply. Players may hold more than one non-FIFA nationality.

No.	Pos.	Nation	Player
1	GK	KSA	Ammar Al-Diraihim
2	DF	KSA	Saleh Al-Johani
4	DF	KSA	Hatim Belal
5	DF	GUA	Ebrahem Diallo
7	FW	KSA	Abdullah Mabrook
9	FW	KSA	Sultan Al-Suraihi
10	MF	KSA	Yazeed Al-Ghamdi
11	MF	KSA	Issam Al-Amri
12	DF	KSA	Mousa Al-Amoudi
13	MF	KSA	Abdullah Al-Najem
15	MF	KSA	Assem Al-Hussaini
16	MF	KSA	Hassan Sufyani
18	FW	KSA	Abdulrahman Al-Ameri
20	FW	KSA	Jaber Asiri
21	MF	KSA	Ahmed Al-Shanqiti
22	GK	KSA	Saad Yousef
23	MF	KSA	Ahmed Bagheel
24	DF	KSA	Jawad Al-Muwallad

No.	Pos.	Nation	Player
25	DF	KSA	Ahmed Amin
27	MF	KSA	Mohanad Al-Rashidi
28	DF	KSA	Mohammed Waleed
29	MF	KSA	Hayal Al-Ghamdi
32	FW	KSA	Eisa Al-Amoudi
33	GK	KSA	Hamza Shehata
37	MF	KSA	Waleed Hawsawi
47	DF	KSA	Jawad Al-Nakhli
50	DF	KSA	Abdulmohsen Asiri
55	DF	KSA	Nawaf Al-Sobhi
66	DF	KSA	Imran Al-Johani
70	MF	KSA	Rayyan Seddiq
77	MF	KSA	Reda Al-Harbi
79	MF	KSA	Muaiad Khaled
88	DF	KSA	Abdullah Suwayed
90	MF	KSA	Nawaf Al-Harbi
96	MF	KSA	Abdullah Al-Fraidi
97	FW	KSA	Faisal Al-Mghazel
99	FW	KSA	Yousef Abdulwahab

== See also ==
- List of football clubs in Saudi Arabia
