= Ohod Club =

Saudi Arabian football club based in Medina

- Full name: Ohod Saudi Football Club
- Nickname: Al-Jabal (The Mountain)
- Founded: 1936; 90 years ago
- Ground: Prince Mohammad bin Abdulaziz Stadium
- Capacity: 24,000
- Chairman: Hamood Al-Oufi
- Manager: Yousef Anbar
- League: Saudi First Division League
- 2024–25: FDL, 17th of 18 (relegated)
- Website: ohudclub.com
Home colours	Away colours

Ohod Club (Arabic: نادي أحد) is a Saudi Arabian professional football club based in Medina, which competes in the Saudi Second Division League.

The club also has a men's basketball team.

== History ==
Ohod was named after Mount Uhud, hence the nickname "Al-Jabal". Ohod have won the Saudi First Division three times and have been runners-up five times. They play their home games at the Prince Mohammed bin Abdul Aziz Stadium.

During the 1994 FIFA World Cup, two players from Ohod, Hamzah Idris and Thomas Libiih, were selected for the Saudi Arabia national team and the Cameroon national team, respectively. Other famous players are Redha Tukar (1995–2001) and Mohammad Khouja (2003–2005).

== Honours ==
- Saudi First Division League
  - Winners (3): 1980–81, 1983–84, 2003–04
  - Runners-up (5): 1978–79, 1986–87, 1990–91, 1992–93, 2016–17
- Saudi Second Division League
  - Runners-up (2): 2000–01, 2006–07
- Prince Faisal bin Fahd Cup for Division 1 and 2 Teams
  - Winners (1): 1994–95
  - Runners-up (4): 1992–93, 1998–99, 2001–02, 2003–04,

== Current squad ==
As of 29 January 2024

Note: Flags indicate national team as defined under FIFA eligibility rules; some limited exceptions apply. Players may hold more than one non-FIFA nationality.

No.	Pos.	Nation	Player
1	GK	KSA	Madhi Sultan
3	FW	KSA	Anas Al-Johani
4	DF	KSA	Ali Zamzami
5	DF	KSA	Ali Al-Sherif
6	MF	KSA	Anas Al-Mami
7	MF	KSA	Mohammed Al-Otaibi
9	FW	KSA	Mohammed Al-Khaibari
10	MF	KSA	Ali Al-Nemer
11	MF	KSA	Ammar Al-Oufi
12	DF	KSA	Ali Attiyah Al-Nakhli
13	DF	KSA	Abdullah Al-Nakhli
14	DF	KSA	Aseel Al-Sherif
15	MF	KSA	Abdulmalek Al-Harbi

No.	Pos.	Nation	Player
17	DF	KSA	Ali Qassem Al-Nakhli
18	MF	KSA	Hamed Al-Otaibi
20	FW	KSA	Marwan Al-Toori
22	GK	KSA	Abdulaziz Osailan
24	DF	KSA	Mohammed Abdulghani
25	DF	KSA	Basel Bandar
27	FW	KSA	Iyas Al-Zoghaibi
33	GK	KSA	Mohammed Al-Rashidi
44	DF	KSA	Fayez Al-Harbi
55	DF	KSA	Aseel Al-Qaidi
70	MF	KSA	Mubarak Al-Harbi
75	DF	KSA	Suhayb Awaji
77	MF	KSA	Abdulrahman Abo Ouf

== Staff ==
Position	Name
Chairman	(Saudi Arabia) Hamood Al-Oufi
Manager	(Saudi Arabia) Yousef Anbar
Assistant Manager	(Albania) Renato Arapi (Saudi Arabia) Abdullah Al-Khodari (Saudi Arabia) Fahad Al-Ibrahim (Saudi Arabia) Mohammed Al-Hassan
Goalkeeping Coach	(Saudi Arabia) Saif Al-Khenani
Fitness Coach	(Saudi Arabia) Bader Al-Harbi
Youth Coach	(Romania) Augustin Călin
Development Coach	(Saudi Arabia) Ahmed Al-Nakhli
Opponent Analyst	(Bahrain) Mujtaba Mohammed
Team Doctor	(Saudi Arabia) Mohammed Al-Sobhi
Physiotherapist	(Saudi Arabia) Abdulrahman Al-Nakhli
Masseur	(Saudi Arabia) Rashed Al-Harbi

== Former managers ==
- (Egypt) Mohieddine Sharshar (1975–78)
- (Tunisia) Jamel Eddine Bouabsa (1978–79)
- (Sudan) Mansour Ramadan (1979–80)
- (Sudan) Said Salim (1980–81)
- (Tunisia) Hameur Hizem (1981–83)
- (Egypt) Mamdouh Khafagi (1983–84)
- (Morocco) Boujemaa Benkhrif (1984–86)
- (Egypt) Mohieddine Sharshar (1986)
- (Saudi Arabia) Abdullah Foudah (1986–87)
- (Saudi Arabia) Abdullah Foudah (1990–91)
- (Egypt) Mahmoud Abou-Regaila (1991–93)
- (Tunisia) Habib Majeri (1993)
- (Egypt) Mahmoud Abou-Regaila (1993–94)
- (Saudi Arabia) Abdulaziz Raheem (1994)
- (Egypt) Mohamed Seddik (1994)
- (Brazil) Luciano de Abreu (1994–96)
- (Egypt) Abdullah Darwish (2003–04)
- (Tunisia) Djamel Belkacem (2008–09)
- (Tunisia) Abdel-Wahab Khraf (June 2, 2009 – September 17, 2009)
- (Tunisia) Mohammed Al Sahali (caretaker) (September 17, 2009 – October 6, 2009)
- (Tunisia) Chokri Khatoui (October 6, 2009 – June 4, 2010)
- (Romania) Petre Gigiu (June 22, 2010 – December 12, 2010)
- (Romania) Florin (December 12, 2010 – February 20, 2011)
- (Egypt) Ayman Al-Seraj (February 20, 2011 – April 5, 2011)
- (Egypt) Essam Mohammed (caretaker) (April 5, 2011 – April 11, 2011)
- (Egypt) Hamadah Marzooq (April 11, 2011 – May 18, 2011)
- (Romania) Aurel Țicleanu (June 14, 2011 – December 15, 2011)
- (Tunisia) Mukram Abdallah (December 17, 2011 – January 14, 2012)
- (Egypt) Aboud El Khodary (January 14, 2012 – September 25, 2013)
- (Egypt) Abdullah Darwish (September 25, 2013 – December 15, 2013)
- (Tunisia) Hadi Ben Mukhtar (December 29, 2013 – February 21, 2014)
- (Saudi Arabia) Abdulwahab Al-Harbi (February 24, 2014 – November 5, 2017)
- (Algeria) Nabil Neghiz (November 10, 2017 – February 18, 2018)
- (Tunisia) Maher Kanzari (February 23, 2018 – April 12, 2018)
- (Senegal) Sadio Demba (April 12, 2018 – May 4, 2018)
- (Paraguay) Francisco Arce (June 9, 2018 – November 23, 2018)
- (Portugal) Paulo Alves (November 27, 2018 – January 14, 2019)
- (Tunisia) Ammar Souayah (January 19, 2019 – May 17, 2019)
- (Serbia) Nenad Sakić (July 23, 2019 – August 12, 2019)
- (Tunisia) Tarek Jaraya (August 12, 2019 – September 6, 2019)
- (Saudi Arabia) Yousef Anbar (September 6, 2019 – August 18, 2020)
- (Saudi Arabia) Ayoub Ghulam (August 18, 2020 – September 20, 2020)
- (Tunisia) Djamel Belkacem (September 21, 2020 – December 24, 2020)
- (Saudi Arabia) Khalil Al-Masri (December 26, 2020 – June 1, 2021)
- (Tunisia) Chokri Khatoui (July 16, 2021 – November 9, 2021)
- (Saudi Arabia) Khalil Al-Masri (November 9, 2021 – September 12, 2022)
- (Nigeria) Ndubuisi Egbo (caretaker) (September 12, 2022 – September 20, 2022)
- (Albania) Ernest Gjoka (September 20, 2022 – March 15, 2023)
- (Romania) Augustin Călin (caretaker) (March 15, 2023 – April 1, 2023)
- (Tunisia) Mohamed Mkacher (April 1, 2023 – June 1, 2023)
- (North Macedonia) Zekirija Ramadani (June 20, 2023 – September 24, 2023)
- (Saudi Arabia) Mazen Al-Blwi (caretaker) (September 24, 2023 – September 30, 2023)
- (Croatia) Damir Burić (September 30, 2023 – June 1, 2024)
- (Saudi Arabia) Yousef Anbar (July 20, 2024 – February 5, 2025)
- (Tunisia) Hafedh Hamzaoui (caretaker) (February 5, 2025 – February 15, 2025)
- (Tunisia) Habib Ben Romdhane (February 15, 2025 – May 31, 2025)
- (Saudi Arabia) Ibrahim Al-Ahmadi (August 21, 2025 – November 20, 2025)
- (Saudi Arabia) Rami Hijar (November 22, 2025 – )

== See also ==
- List of football clubs in Saudi Arabia
