= Saudi Second Division League =

Second Division League دوري الدرجة الثانية
- Organising body: Saudi Arabian Football Federation (SAFF)
- Founded: 1976; 50 years ago
- Country: Saudi Arabia
- Confederation: AFC
- Number of clubs: 32 (since 2022–23)
- Level on pyramid: 3
- Promotion to: Saudi First Division League
- Relegation to: Saudi Third Division League
- Current champions: Diriyah (2nd title) (2024–25)
- Most championships: Al-Fateh; Al-Shoulla; Al-Najma (3 titles each)
- Broadcaster(s): SAFF+
- Website: saff.com.sa/en/
- Current: 2025–26 Saudi Second Division League

The Saudi Second Division League (SDL) is a professional association football league in Saudi Arabia and serves as the third tier of the Saudi football league system. The league consists of 32 teams divided into two groups and ranks directly below the Saudi First Division League.

== Competition format ==
The league is divided into two groups: Group A and Group B.

A total of three teams are promoted to the First Division League. The top two teams from each group gain direct promotion. The third-placed teams from both groups compete in a two-legged playoff, with the winner also promoted as the third team.

Meanwhile, four teams are relegated to the Third Division League. The bottom two clubs from each group are relegated.

The group winners face off in a single match to determine the overall champion of the league. This match is hosted by the team with the higher number of points.

Each club must register a minimum of 16 and a maximum of 25 players. The squad may include up to three foreign players and one player born in Saudi Arabia, with the remaining players being Saudi nationals. Beginning with the 2025–26 season, only Saudi players have been allowed to play as goalkeepers.

== Champions ==
=== List of champions ===
#	Season	Champion	Runners-up
1	1976–77	Al-Tai	Al-Najma
2	1977–78	Al-Taawoun	Al-Jabalain
3	1978–79	Al-Kawkab	Al-Noor
4	1979–80	Al-Rawdah	Al-Raed
5	1980–81	Damac	Okaz
6	1981–82	Al-Shoulla	Abha
7	1982–83	Al-Fateh	Abha
8	1983–84	Al-Ansar	Al-Raed
9	1984–85	Al-Fayha	Okaz
10	1985–86	Al-Arabi	Al-Jeel
11	1986–87	Al-Shoulla	Hajer
12	1987–88	Al-Najma	Al-Watani
13	1988–89	Al-Oyoon	Al-Khaleej
14	1989–90	Al-Faisaly	Damac
15	1990–91	Al-Ansar	Al-Jabalain
16	1991–92	Al-Okhdood	Al-Shoulla
17	1992–93	Najran	Al-Tuhami
18	1993–94	Abha	Sdoos
19	1994–95	Al-Khaleej	Al-Jabalain
20	1995–96	Al-Tuhami	Al-Watani
21	1996–97	Al-Fateh	Najran
22	1997–98	Al-Nahda	Sdoos
23	1998–99	Al-Fateh	Al-Orobah
24	1999–2000	Abha	Al-Hazem
25	2000–01	Al-Hamadah	Ohod
26	2001–02	Hajer	Al-Jabalain
27	2002–03	Al-Faisaly	Al-Fateh
28	2003–04	Najran	Al-Fayha
29	2004–05	Al-Watani	Damac
30	2005–06	Sdoos	Al-Nahda
31	2006–07	Al-Raed	Ohod
32	2007–08	Al-Orobah	Hetten
33	2008–09	Al-Shoulla	Al Adalah
34	2009–10	Al-Najma	Al-Jeel
35	2010–11	Al-Nahda	Al-Batin
36	2011–12	Sdoos	Al-Najma
37	2012–13	Diriyah	Al-Kawkab
38	2013–14	Al-Fayha	Al-Safa
39	2014–15	Damac	Al-Nojoom
40	2015–16	Al-Qaisumah	Al-Adalah
41	2016–17	Al-Kawkab	Jeddah
42	2017–18	Al-Washm	Al-Jabalain
43	2018–19	Hetten	Al-Bukiryah
44	2019–20	Hajer	Diriyah
45	2020–21	Al-Okhdood	Al-Orobah
46	2021–22	Al-Arabi	Al-Qaisumah
47	2022–23	Al-Najma	Al-Taraji
48	2023–24	Neom	Al-Jubail
49	2024–25	Diriyah	Al-Ula
50	2025–26	Al-Saqer	Al-Jeel

== Performance by club ==
Club	Titles	Winning years
Al-Fateh	3	1983, 1997, 1999
Al-Shoulla	3	1982, 1987, 2009
Al-Najma	3	1988, 2010, 2023
Al-Ansar	2	1984, 1991
Abha	2	1994, 2000
Al-Faisaly	2	1990, 2003
Najran	2	1993, 2004
Al-Nahda	2	1998, 2011
Sdoos	2	2006, 2012
Al-Fayha	2	1985, 2014
Damac	2	1981, 2015
Al-Kawkab	2	1979, 2017
Hajer	2	2002, 2020
Al-Okhdood	2	1992, 2021
Al-Arabi	2	1986, 2022
Diriyah	2	2013, 2025
Al-Tai	1	1977
Al-Taawoun	1	1978
Al-Rawdah	1	1980
Al-Oyoon	1	1989
Al-Khaleej	1	1995
Al-Tuhami	1	1996
Al-Hamadah	1	2001
Al-Watani	1	2005
Al-Raed	1	2007
Al-Orobah	1	2008
Al-Qaisumah	1	2016
Al-Washm	1	2018
Hetten	1	2019
Neom	1	2024
Al-Saqer	1	2026

== Top scorers ==
Season	Top scorer(s)	Club(s)	Goals
2017–18	(Saudi Arabia) Hossam Al-Shadhli	Hetten	19
2018–19	(Saudi Arabia) Abdullah Al-Yahya	Al-Sadd	16
2019–20	(Tunisia) Mohamed Aouichi	Al-Arabi	15
2020–21	(Senegal) Elhadji Malick (Mauritania) Mohammed Salem	Al-Riyadh; Al-Kholood	22
2021–22	(Nigeria) Israel Abia (Tunisia) Youssef Trabelsi	Al-Rawdah; Al-Zulfi	20
2022–23	(Nigeria) Aniekpeno Udo	Al-Jandal	23
2023–24	(Madagascar) Carolus Andria (Chad) Maher Sharoma	Al-Kawkab; Al-Taqadom	18
2024–25	(Saudi Arabia) Hassan Al-Solan	Al-Jeel	20
2025–26	(Brazil) Papel	Al-Lewaa	24

== See also ==
- Saudi Arabian Football Federation
- Football in Saudi Arabia
- List of football clubs in Saudi Arabia
- List of football stadiums in Saudi Arabia
- Saudi Super Cup
- King's Cup
- Crown Prince Cup
- Prince Faisal bin Fahd Cup
- Saudi Founder's Cup
- Saudi Women's Second Division League
- Sport in Saudi Arabia
- Saudi Arabia Ministry of Sport
