= 2017–18 Al-Hazm F.C. season =

Al-Hazem
2017–18 season
- President: Abdullah Al-Meqhim
- Manager: Al Habib bin Ramadan (until 5 April); Abdulwahab Al-Harbi (from 5 April)
- Stadium: Al-Hazem Club Stadium
- Prince Mohammad bin Salman League: 2nd (promoted)
- King Cup: Round of 32 (knocked out by Al-Fateh)
- Top goalscorer: League: Ali Khormi (12); All: Ali Khormi (12)
Home colours	Away colours
- All statistics correct as of 18 April 2018.

The 2017–18 season was Al-Hazem's 7th consecutive season in the second tier of Saudi football and 61st year in existence. Along with competing in the Prince Mohammad bin Salman League, the club also participated in the King Cup.

The season covered the period from 1 July 2017 to 30 June 2018.

== Players ==
=== Squad information ===
As of 3 January 2018

Note: Flags indicate national team as defined under FIFA eligibility rules; some limited exceptions apply. Players may hold more than one non-FIFA nationality.

No.	Pos.	Nation	Player
2	DF	KSA	Rakan Al-Harbi
3	DF	KSA	Khaled Al-Barakah
4	DF	KSA	Amjed Barnawi
6	MF	KSA	Tareq Al-Kaebi
7	FW	KSA	Ahmed Al-Zaaq
8	FW	KSA	Hamed Al Maqati
10	MF	KSA	Moayad Al-Tolayhi
11	FW	GUI	Ousmane Pato
12	DF	KSA	Salem Al-Hamdan
13	MF	ALG	Bouazza Feham
14	MF	SDN	Saeed Mustafa
16	MF	KSA	Ismael Musallami
17	MF	KSA	Mohammed Al-Balawi
18	MF	KSA	Saeed Al-Qarni

No.	Pos.	Nation	Player
20	DF	KSA	Abdullah Al Harbi
21	GK	KSA	Dawod Al Saeed
22	GK	KSA	Abdullah Abdulhameed
23	DF	KSA	Saud Mekbesh
24	FW	KSA	Mohammed Al-Bishi
25	MF	KSA	Sultan Al-Nemri
32	DF	KSA	Masoud Bakheet
33	MF	KSA	Abdulrahman Al-Dakheel
35	GK	KSA	Mohammed Al-Haiti (on loan from Al-Ettifaq)
45	GK	KSA	Abdulraheem Al-Khaibari
77	DF	KSA	Saif Al-Qeshtah
88	MF	KSA	Maher Al Mutairi
98	FW	KSA	Ali Khormi
99	FW	KSA	Khaled Al-Lazam

== Transfers ==
=== In ===
Date	Pos.	Name	Previous club	Fee	Source
18 May 2017	FW	(Saudi Arabia) Abdulfattah Adam	(Saudi Arabia) Al-Jeel	Free	
26 May 2017	MF	(Sudan) Saeed Mustafa	(Saudi Arabia) Al-Fayha	Free	
3 June 2017	MF	(Brazil) Douglas	(Saudi Arabia) Al-Jeel	Free	
5 June 2017	DF	(Saudi Arabia) Khaled Al-Barakah	(Saudi Arabia) Hajer	Free	
8 June 2017	DF	(Saudi Arabia) Saud Mekbesh	(Saudi Arabia) Al-Fayha	Free	
14 June 2017	GK	(Saudi Arabia) Abduraheem Al-Khaibari	(Saudi Arabia) Al-Thoqbah	Undisclosed	
14 June 2017	MF	(Saudi Arabia) Rakan Al-Towairqi	(Saudi Arabia) Wej	Free	
19 June 2017	GK	(Saudi Arabia) Dawod Al Saeed	(Saudi Arabia) Al-Nahda	Free	
20 June 2017	DF	(Saudi Arabia) Saif Al-Qeshtah	(Saudi Arabia) Wej	Free	
20 June 2017	MF	(Saudi Arabia) Saeed Al-Qarni	(Saudi Arabia) Wej	Free	
7 July 2017	FW	(Saudi Arabia) Ali Khormi	(Saudi Arabia) Al-Raed	Free	
19 July 2017	MF	(Saudi Arabia) Abdulrahman Al-Dakheel	(Saudi Arabia) Al-Arabi	Free	
19 July 2017	MF	(Saudi Arabia) Maher Al Mutairi	(Saudi Arabia) Al-Arabi	Undisclosed	
25 July 2017	FW	(Saudi Arabia) Hamed Al Maqati	(Saudi Arabia) Al-Diriyah	Free	
26 August 2017	DF	(Saudi Arabia) Abdurahman Al-Saeed	(Saudi Arabia) Al-Wehda	Free	
7 December 2017	FW	(Saudi Arabia) Mohammed Al-Bishi	(Saudi Arabia) Al-Fayha	Free	
6 January 2018	MF	(Algeria) Bouazza Feham	(Saudi Arabia) Al-Wehda	Undisclosed	
27 January 2018	FW	(Guinea) Ousmane Pato	Unattached	Free	

=== Loans in ===
Date	Pos.	Name	Parent club	End date	Source
31 January 2018	GK	(Saudi Arabia) Mohammed Al-Haiti	(Saudi Arabia) Al-Ettifaq	End of season	

=== Out ===
Date	Pos.	Name	New club	Fee	Source
1 June 2017	MF	(Saudi Arabia) Abdulaziz Al-Harbi	Unattached	Released	
1 June 2017	MF	(Saudi Arabia) Saleh Al-Muhaimeed	(Saudi Arabia) Al-Badaya	Free	
4 June 2017	MF	(Kenya) Kevin Kimani	(Kenya) Sofapaka	Free	
4 June 2017	FW	(Sudan) Montaser Rabe’e	Unattached	Released	
7 June 2017	DF	(Saudi Arabia) Yahya Dhabiani	(Saudi Arabia) Al-Watani	Free	
13 July 2017	GK	(Saudi Arabia) Yahia Al-Shehri	(Saudi Arabia) Al-Kawkab	Free	
15 July 2017	MF	(Sudan) Muddather Al-Alameen	(Saudi Arabia) Al-Tai	Free	
29 July 2017	MF	(Saudi Arabia) Ziyad Al-Mutairi	(Saudi Arabia) Al-Kawkab	Free	
30 July 2017	GK	(Saudi Arabia) Abdulaziz Al-Qahtani	(Saudi Arabia) Al-Kawkab	Free	
20 August 2017	MF	(Saudi Arabia) Majed Al-Marhoum	(Saudi Arabia) Al-Selmiyah	Free	
21 September 2017	FW	(Saudi Arabia) Abdulaziz Al-Mutair	(Saudi Arabia) Hajer	Free	
9 October 2017	DF	(Saudi Arabia) Abdurahman Al-Saeed	(Saudi Arabia) Al-Kawkab	Free	
18 October 2017	DF	(Saudi Arabia) Moataz Al-Muwallad	(Saudi Arabia) Al-Riyadh	Free	
27 October 2017	DF	(Saudi Arabia) Waleed Al-Harbi	(Saudi Arabia) Al-Amal	Free	
14 January 2018	MF	(Brazil) Douglas	(Saudi Arabia) Al-Shoulla	Free	
17 January 2018	MF	(Saudi Arabia) Rakan Al-Towairqi	(Saudi Arabia) Al-Ain	Free	
28 January 2018	FW	(Saudi Arabia) Abdulfattah Adam	(Saudi Arabia) Al-Taawoun	Free	

== Pre-season friendlies ==
15 August 2017 Friendly	Al-Hazem (Saudi Arabia)	0–2	(Algeria) USM Alger	Istanbul, Turkey
17:30 AST		Report	Sayoud; Yaya

17 August 2017 Friendly	Al-Hazem (Saudi Arabia)	3–2	Kuwait	Istanbul, Turkey
18:00 AST	Khormi; Musallami; Al-Hamdan	Report	Goal

28 August 2017 Friendly	Al-Taawoun (Saudi Arabia)	2–0	(Saudi Arabia) Al-Hazem	Buraidah, Saudi Arabia
19:15 AST	Hazazi 11' (pen.); Amissi 64'	Report		Stadium: King Abdullah Sport City Stadium

30 August 2017 Friendly	Al-Mujazzal (Saudi Arabia)	2–2	(Saudi Arabia) Al-Hazem	Riyadh, Saudi Arabia
17:45 AST	Sidevaldo 78', 83'	Report	Al-Mutairi 66'; Al-Barakah 90'	Stadium: Al Zulfi Club Stadium

== Competitions ==
=== Overall ===
Competition	Started round	Current position / round	Final position / round	First match	Last match
Prince MbS League	—	—	2nd	13 September 2017	18 April 2018
King Cup	Round of 32	—	Round of 32	5 January 2018	5 January 2018

Last Updated: 18 April 2018

=== Prince Mohammad bin Salman League ===
==== League table ====
Pos	Team	Pld	W	D	L	GF	GA	GD	Pts	Promotion, qualification or relegation
1	Al-Wehda (C, P)	30	17	7	6	49	32	+17	58	Promotion to Professional League
2	Al-Hazem (P)	30	15	8	7	50	32	+18	53	Promotion to Professional League
3	Al-Tai	30	15	7	8	52	35	+17	52	Qualification to promotion play-offs
4	Al-Kawkab	30	14	8	8	52	33	+19	50 (Note: Al-Kawkab finished ahead of Hajer on head-to-head points: Al-Kawkab 2–0 Hajer, Hajer 2–2 Al-Kawkab)	Qualification to promotion play-offs
5	Hajer	30	14	8	8	39	35	+4	50	
6	Al-Shoulla	30	11	10	9	42	43	−1	43	
7	Al-Khaleej	30	10	11	9	45	40	+5	41	
8	Al-Qaisumah	30	11	7	12	52	54	−2	40	
9	Damac	30	10	9	11	49	43	+6	39	
10	Al-Orobah	30	9	11	10	36	39	−3	38	
11	Al-Nahda	30	9	8	13	35	50	−15	35	
12	Al-Nojoom	30	6	15	9	34	41	−7	33 (Note: Head-to-head points: Al-Nojoom 8 pts; Al-Mujazzal 4 pts and –1 GD; Najran 4 pts and –2 GD (Al-Nojoom 2–1 Al-Mujazzal, Al-Mujazzal 0–0 Al-Nojoom, Al-Nojoom 2–0 Najran, Najran 1–1 Al-Nojoom, Najran 1–2 Al-Mujazzal, Al-Mujazzal 1–2 Najran).)	
13	Al-Mujazzal	30	10	3	17	39	52	−13	33	
14	Najran (O)	30	9	6	15	39	51	−12	33	Qualification to Relegation play-offs
15	Al-Watani (R)	30	5	12	13	33	48	−15	27	Qualification to Relegation play-offs
16	Jeddah (O)	30	5	10	15	43	61	−18	25	Qualification to Relegation play-offs

Updated to match(es) played on 18 April 2018. Source: kooora.com
Rules for classification: 1) Points; 2) Head-to-head points; 3) Head-to-head goal difference; 4) Total goal difference; 5) Total goals scored; 6) Play-off (only for deciding champion, promotion and relegation).
(C) Champions; (O) Play-off winners; (P) Promoted; (R) Relegated

==== Results summary ====
Overall								Home						Away					
Pld	W	D	L	GF	GA	GD	Pts	W	D	L	GF	GA	GD	W	D	L	GF	GA	GD
30	15	8	7	50	32	+18	53	10	4	1	35	14	+21	5	4	6	15	18	−3

Last updated: 18 April 2018.
Source: Competitive matches

==== Results by round ====
Round	1	2	3	4	5	6	7	8	9	10	11	12	13	14	15	16	17	18	19	20	21	22	23	24	25	26	27	28	29	30
Ground	A	H	A	H	A	H	A	H	A	H	A	H	A	H	A	H	A	H	A	H	A	H	A	H	A	H	A	H	A	H
Result	D	D	D	W	D	W	L	D	W	D	W	W	L	W	W	W	L	W	W	W	W	W	L	W	L	D	L	L	L	W
Position	13	11	11	5	7	4	7	8	3	5	3	2	2	2	2	2	2	2	2	2	2	2	2	1	2	2	2	2	3	2

Updated to match(es) played on 18 April 2018. Source: Competitive matches
A = Away; H = Home; W = Win; D = Draw; L = Loss

==== Matches ====
All times are local, AST (UTC+3).

Win Draw Loss Postponed

13 September 2017 1	Al-Qaisumah	1–1	Al-Hazem	Hafar al-Batin
18:45	Al-Shammeri 70'	Report	Douglas 39'	Stadium: Al-Batin Club Stadium; Referee: Qassem Al-Mohammed

19 September 2017 2	Al-Hazem	1–1	Al-Orobah	Ar Rass
18:45	Musallami 28'	Report	Rawaf 9'	Stadium: Al-Hazem Club Stadium; Referee: Fahd Al-Nawaf

27 September 2017 3	Al-Nahda	0–0	Al-Hazem	Dammam
18:15		Report		Stadium: Prince Fahd bin Salman Stadium; Referee: Mamdooh Al-Shahdan

3 October 2017 4	Al-Hazem	3–1	Al-Shoulla	Ar Rass
18:30	Al-Barakah 25'; Khormi 69', 84'	Report	Al-Munaif 34'	Stadium: Al-Hazem Club Stadium; Referee: Tareq Al-Zahrani

10 October 2017 5	Hajer	0–0	Al-Hazem	Al-Hasa
18:00		Report		Stadium: Prince Abdullah bin Jalawi Stadium; Referee: Abdulrahman Al-Shehri

17 October 2017 6	Al-Hazem	2–1	Najran	Al-Bukayriyah
18:15	Khormi 29'; Adam 61'	Report	Al-Telhi 25'; Haqawi (red card) 88'	Stadium: Al-Amal Club Stadium; Referee: Ahmed Al-Shammari

24 October 2017 7	Al-Wehda	2–1	Al-Hazem	Mecca
18:55	Madkhali 44', 60'	Report	Al-Zaaq 83', (red card) 88'	Stadium: King Abdul Aziz Stadium; Referee: Raed Al-Zahrani

1 November 2017 8	Al-Hazem	2–2	Al-Khaleej	Ar Rass
15:25	Al-Qeshtah 24'; Al-Nemri 32' (pen.)	Report	Al-Najrani 47', 71'	Stadium: Al-Hazem Club Stadium; Referee: Abdullah Al-Awidan

8 November 2017 9	Jeddah	1–3	Al-Hazem	Jeddah
18:25	Al-Johani 10'	Report	Adam 8', 51'; Al-Maqati 24'	Stadium: Reserve Stadium in King Abdullah Sports City; Referee: Mamdooh Al-Shahdan

15 November 2017 10	Al-Hazem	2–2	Al-Tai	Ar Rass
18:00	Khormi 83'; Al-Zaaq 90+1'	Report	Al-Enezi 29'; Al-Qeshtah 90+4' (o.g.)	Stadium: Al-Hazem Club Stadium; Referee: Sultan Al-Harbi

22 November 2017 11	Al-Kawkab	0–1	Al-Hazem	Al-Kharj
15:05		Report	Adam 62' (pen.)	Stadium: Al-Shoulla Club Stadium; Referee: Khalid Salwi

29 November 2017 12	Al-Hazem	2–0	Al-Nojoom	Ar Rass
15:15	Al-Maqati 17'; Adam 66'	Report		Stadium: Al-Hazem Club Stadium; Referee: Majed Al-Shamrani

6 December 2017 13	Damac	2–0	Al-Hazem	Khamis Mushait
15:30	Foaad 7'; Hazzam 90+3'	Report		Stadium: Damac Club Stadium; Referee: Sultan Al-Harbi

13 December 2017 14	Al-Hazem	3–0	Al-Watani	Ar Rass
15:20	Adam 25'; Khormi 64'; Al-Zaaq 90+5'	Report		Stadium: Al-Hazem Club Stadium; Referee: Turki Al-Khudair

20 December 2017 15	Al-Mujazzal	0–1	Al-Hazem	Al Majma'ah
15:15		Report	Musallami 38'	Stadium: King Salman Sport City Stadium; Referee: Abdulrahman Al-Shehri

11 January 2018 16	Al-Hazem	5–2	Al-Qaisumah	Ar Rass
15:35	Khormi 16', 18', 47'; Adam 52', 58'	Report	Al-Mutairi 2'; Al-Shammeri 70'	Stadium: Al-Hazem Club Stadium; Referee: Sultan Al-Okairi

16 January 2018 17	Al-Orobah	1–0	Al-Hazem	Sakakah
15:45	Al-Soudani 54'	Report		Stadium: Al-Oruba Club Stadium; Referee: Shukri Al-Hanfoush

30 January 2018 19	Al-Shoulla	0–1	Al-Hazem	Al-Kharj
15:35		Report	Al-Nemri 10'	Stadium: Al-Shoulla Club Stadium; Referee: Sultan Al-Harbi

3 February 2018 18	Al-Hazem	3–2	Al-Nahda	Ar Rass
15:50	Pato 30', 67', 78'	Report	Ghazwani 34'; Al-Khamees 82' (pen.)	Stadium: Al-Hazem Club Stadium; Referee: Turki Al-Khudair

7 February 2018 20	Al-Hazem	3–0	Hajer	Ar Rass
15:50	Mustafa 22'; Khormi 61', 86'	Report	Slimene (red card) 58'	Stadium: Al Hazm Club Stadium; Referee: Sami Al-Jires

14 February 2018 21	Najran	0–2	Al-Hazem	Abha
16:05		Report	Mustafa 15'; Feham 90+1'	Stadium: Prince Sultan bin Abdul Aziz Stadium; Referee: Abdullah Al-Shehri

20 February 2018 22	Al-Hazem	2–0	Al-Wehda	Ar Rass
16:00	Pato 20', 64'	Report		Stadium: Al Hazm Club Stadium; Referee: Khaled Al-Teris

28 February 2018 23	Al-Khaleej	2–1	Al-Hazem	Khobar
15:35	Al-Khateeb 8'; Gilmar 47' (pen.)	Report	Barnawi 33'	Stadium: Prince Saud bin Jalawi Stadium; Referee: Turki Al-Khudair

7 March 2018 24	Al-Hazem	2–0	Jeddah	Ar Rass
16:05	Al-Nemri 26'; Pato 58'	Report		Stadium: Al Hazm Club Stadium; Referee: Majed Al-Shamrani

13 March 2018 25	Al-Tai	3–1	Al-Hazem	Ha'il
16:10	Al-Enezi 12'; Metlaq 53', 89'	Report	Pato 35'	Stadium: Prince Abdul Aziz bin Musa'ed Stadium; Referee: Abdulrahman Al-Shehri

21 March 2018 26	Al-Hazem	1–1	Al-Kawkab	Ar Rass
19:00	Khormi 4'	Report	Diouf 67'	Stadium: Al Hazm Club Stadium; Referee: Fahad Al-Mirdasi

28 March 2018 27	Al-Nojoom	4–1	Al-Hazem	Al-Hasa
18:35	Al-Harbi 34' (pen.), 58'; Juninho 54'; Adamo 86'	Report	Feham 78'	Stadium: Prince Abdullah bin Jalawi Stadium; Referee: Abdulsamad Al-Bakri

5 April 2018 28	Al-Hazem	0–1	Damac	Ar Rass
19:05		Report	Hazzam 87'	Stadium: Al Hazm Club Stadium; Referee: Sultan Al-Harbi

11 April 2018 29	Al-Watani	2–2	Al-Hazem	Tabuk
20:45	Eisa 41'; Al-Balawi 66'	Report	Feham 75'; Pato 85'	Stadium: King Khalid Sport City Stadium; Referee: Abdullah Al Nuhait

18 April 2018 30	Al-Hazem	4–1	Al-Mujazzal	Ar Rass
20:45	Khormi 35'; Pato 40', 86'; Al-Maqati 71'	Report	Sidevaldo 81' (pen.)	Stadium: Al Hazm Club Stadium; Referee: Shukri Al-Hanfoush

=== King Cup ===
All times are local, AST (UTC+3).

5 January 2018 Round of 32	Al-Fateh	1–0	Al-Hazem	Al-Hasa
15:05	Sharahili 27'	Report		Stadium: Prince Abdullah bin Jalawi Stadium; Referee: Abdullah Al-Shehri

== Statistics ==
=== Squad statistics ===
As of 18 April 2018.

No.	Pos	Nat	Player	Total		Prince MbS League		King Cup	
No.	Pos	Nat	Player	Apps	Goals	Apps	Goals	Apps	Goals
1	GK	(Saudi Arabia)	Mohammed Al-Haiti	0	0	0	0	0	0
3	DF	(Saudi Arabia)	Khaled Al-Barakah	27	1	27	1	0	0
4	DF	(Saudi Arabia)	Amjed Barnawi	12	1	7+4	1	1	0
6	MF	(Saudi Arabia)	Tareq Al-Kaebi	1	0	0	0	1	0
7	FW	(Saudi Arabia)	Ahmed Al-Zaaq	18	3	4+13	3	1	0
8	FW	(Saudi Arabia)	Hamed Al Maqati	21	3	16+4	3	1	0
10	MF	(Saudi Arabia)	Moayad Al-Tolayhi	6	0	2+3	0	1	0
11	FW	(Guinea)	Ousmane Pato	12	10	12	10	0	0
12	DF	(Saudi Arabia)	Salem Al-Hamdan	13	0	3+9	0	1	0
13	MF	(Algeria)	Bouazza Feham	9	3	3+6	3	0	0
14	MF	(Sudan)	Saeed Mustafa	29	2	29	2	0	0
16	MF	(Saudi Arabia)	Ismael Musallami	27	2	23+3	2	1	0
17	MF	(Saudi Arabia)	Mohammed Al-Balawi	2	0	0+2	0	0	0
18	MF	(Saudi Arabia)	Saeed Al-Qarni	19	0	10+9	0	0	0
20	DF	(Saudi Arabia)	Abdullah Al-Harbi	29	0	28	0	1	0
21	GK	(Saudi Arabia)	Dawod Al Saeed	27	0	27	0	0	0
22	GK	(Saudi Arabia)	Abdullah Abdulhameed	0	0	0	0	0	0
23	DF	(Saudi Arabia)	Saud Mekbesh	8	0	3+4	0	1	0
24	FW	(Saudi Arabia)	Mohammed Al-Bishi	14	0	2+11	0	1	0
25	MF	(Saudi Arabia)	Sultan Al-Nemri	29	3	26+2	3	0+1	0
32	DF	(Saudi Arabia)	Masoud Bakheet	27	0	27	0	0	0
33	MF	(Saudi Arabia)	Abdulrahman Al-Dakheel	0	0	0	0	0	0
45	GK	(Saudi Arabia)	Abdulraheem Al-Khaibari	4	0	3	0	1	0
77	DF	(Saudi Arabia)	Saif Al-Qeshtah	26	1	26	1	0	0
88	MF	(Saudi Arabia)	Maher Al Mutairi	3	0	1+2	0	0	0
98	FW	(Saudi Arabia)	Ali Khormi	29	12	24+4	12	0+1	0
99	FW	(Saudi Arabia)	Khaled Al-Lazam	2	0	0+2	0	0	0
Players who left during the season
9	FW	(Saudi Arabia)	Abdulfattah Adam	17	8	15+1	8	0+1	0
11	MF	(Brazil)	Douglas	14	1	12+2	1	0	0
70	MF	(Saudi Arabia)	Rakan Al-Towairqi	2	0	0+2	0	0	0

=== Goalscorers ===
Rank	No.	Pos	Nat	Name	Prince MbS League	King Cup	Total
1	98	FW	(Saudi Arabia)	Ali Khormi	12	0	12
2	11	FW	(Guinea)	Ousmane Pato	10	0	10
3	9	FW	(Saudi Arabia)	Abdulfattah Adam	8	0	8
4	7	FW	(Saudi Arabia)	Ahmed Al-Zaaq	3	0	3
4	8	FW	(Saudi Arabia)	Hamed Al Maqati	3	0	3
4	13	MF	(Algeria)	Bouazza Feham	3	0	3
4	25	MF	(Saudi Arabia)	Sultan Al-Nemri	3	0	3
8	14	MF	(Sudan)	Saeed Mustafa	2	0	2
8	16	MF	(Saudi Arabia)	Ismael Musallami	2	0	2
10	3	DF	(Saudi Arabia)	Khaled Al-Barakah	1	0	1
10	4	DF	(Saudi Arabia)	Amjed Barnawi	1	0	1
10	11	MF	(Brazil)	Douglas	1	0	1
10	77	DF	(Saudi Arabia)	Saif Al-Qeshtah	1	0	1
Total					50	0	50

Last Updated: 18 April 2018

=== Clean sheets ===
Rank	No.	Pos	Nat	Name	Prince MbS League	King Cup	Total
1	21	GK	(Saudi Arabia)	Dawod Al Saeed	11	0	11
Total					11	0	11

Last Updated: 7 March 2018
