= 2025–26 Alhazem season =

Alhazem
2025–26 season
- President: Salman Al-Malik
- Head coach: Jalel Kadri
- Stadium: Al-Hazem Club Stadium
- Pro League: Pre-season
- King's Cup: Round of 32
- All statistics correct as of 1 July 2025.

The 2025–26 season is Alhazem's 69th year in their existence and the first season back in the top flight of Saudi Arabian football after earning promotion in the previous season. The club will participate in the Pro League and the King's Cup.

The season covers the period from 1 July 2025 to 30 June 2026.

== Players ==
=== Squad information ===
As of 1 July 2025

Note: Flags indicate national team as defined under FIFA eligibility rules; some limited exceptions apply. Players may hold more than one non-FIFA nationality.

No.	Pos.	Nation	Player
2	DF	KSA	Saud Al-Rashed
5	MF	KSA	Mohammed Eisa
6	MF	KSA	Basil Al-Sayyali
7	MF	KSA	Yousef Al-Shammari
12	DF	KSA	Farhan Al-Aazmi
13	DF	KSA	Abdullah Al-Shanqiti
15	MF	KSA	Abdulrahman Al-Khaibari
19	MF	KSA	Nawaf Al-Habashi
20	FW	KSA	Nawaf Al-Bashri
23	GK	KSA	Ibrahim Zaid
25	DF	KSA	Ahmed Asiri
27	DF	KSA	Ahmed Al-Nakhli
29	FW	KSA	Battal Al-Harthi
31	GK	KSA	Abdulaziz Takrouni

No.	Pos.	Nation	Player
33	GK	KSA	Majed Al-Ghamdi
34	DF	KSA	Abdulrahman Al-Dakheel
45	MF	KSA	Mohammed Al-Saedi
46	DF	KSA	Mohammed Al-Subaie
55	MF	KSA	Mohammed Al-Shaeri
60	FW	KSA	Anwer Sharahili
70	MF	KSA	Ahmed Al-Shamrani
77	GK	KSA	Yazan Al-Ruwaili
82	DF	KSA	Abdulaziz Al-Harbi
85	MF	KSA	Rayan Al-Sharekh
88	MF	KSA	Abdulaziz Al-Dhuwayhi
90	MF	KSA	Hassan Idris
—	DF	KSA	Sultan Tankar
—	FW	KSA	Ahmed Al Habib

== Transfers and loans ==
=== Transfers in ===
Entry date	Position	No.	Player	From club	Fee	Ref.
30 June 2025	GK	33	(Saudi Arabia) Majed Al-Ghamdi	(Saudi Arabia) Al-Jeel	End of loan	
30 June 2025	DF	4	(Saudi Arabia) Sultan Tankar	(Saudi Arabia) Jeddah	End of loan	
30 June 2025	DF	11	(Saudi Arabia) Mohammed Al-Thani	(Saudi Arabia) Al-Shabab	End of loan	
30 June 2025	MF	85	(Saudi Arabia) Rayan Al-Sharekh	(Saudi Arabia) Al-Saqer	End of loan	
30 June 2025	FW	29	(Saudi Arabia) Battal Al-Harthi	(Saudi Arabia) Al-Ain	End of loan	
26 August 2025	GK	14	(Cape Verde) Bruno Varela	(Portugal) Vitória	$580,000	
26 August 2025	MF	10	(Portugal) Fábio Martins	(Saudi Arabia) Al-Khaleej	Free	
26 August 2025	MF	11	(Algeria) Amir Sayoud	(Saudi Arabia) Al-Raed	Free	
27 August 2025	MF	24	(Guinea) Aboubacar Bah	(Tunisia) ES Métlaoui	Free	
27 August 2025	MF	32	(France) Loreintz Rosier	(Netherlands) Fortuna Sittard	Free	
27 August 2025	FW	9	(Syria) Omar Al Somah	(Morocco) Wydad	Free	
9 September 2025	DF	–	(Morocco) Abdelmounaim Boutouil	(Morocco) Wydad	Free	
10 September 2025	DF	77	(Saudi Arabia) Khalid Al-Subaie	(Saudi Arabia) Al-Raed	Free	

=== Loans in ===
Start date	End date	Position	No.	Player	From club	Fee	Ref.
27 August 2025	End of season	MF	17	(South Africa) Elias Mokwana	(Tunisia) ES Tunis	$400,000	
4 September 2025	End of season	MF	–	(Saudi Arabia) Abdulhadi Al-Harajin	(Saudi Arabia) Al-Fayha	None	
8 September 2025	End of season	MF	–	(Spain) Miguel Carvalho	(Saudi Arabia) Al-Qadsiah	None	

=== Transfers out ===
Exit date	Position	No.	Player	To club	Fee	Ref.
1 July 2025	DF	11	(Saudi Arabia) Mohammed Al-Thani	(Saudi Arabia) Al-Qadsiah	$2,666,000	
1 July 2025	FW	9	(Saudi Arabia) Turki Al-Mutairi	(Kuwait) Al-Tadamon	Free	
2 July 2025	DF	36	(Saudi Arabia) Sultan Al-Essa	(Saudi Arabia) Al-Riyadh	Free	
2 July 2025	FW	3	(Algeria) Okacha Hamzaoui	(United Arab Emirates) Dibba Al-Hisn	Free	
6 August 2025	DF	4	(Curaçao) Juriën Gaari	(Saudi Arabia) Abha	Free	
24 August 2025	MF	60	(Saudi Arabia) Anwar Sharahili	(Saudi Arabia) Neom	$267,000	
31 August 2025	MF	10	(Senegal) Ibrahima Ndiaye	(Saudi Arabia) Al-Faisaly	Free	
5 September 2025	MF	74	(France) Karim Yoda	(Saudi Arabia) Al-Raed	Free	
5 September 2025	FW	93	(Guinea-Bissau) Zinho Gano	(Saudi Arabia) Al-Raed	Free	
8 September 2025	FW	14	(Saudi Arabia) Sultan Al-Suraihi	(Saudi Arabia) Al-Ansar	Free	
13 September 2025	GK	31	(Saudi Arabia) Abdulaziz Takrouni	(Saudi Arabia) Jeddah	Free	
20 January 2026	MF	6	(Saudi Arabia) Basil Al-Sayyali	(Saudi Arabia) Al-Shabab	Undisclosed	

=== Loans out ===
Start date	End date	Position	No.	Player	To club	Fee	Ref.
26 January 2026	End of season	DF	77	(Saudi Arabia) Khalid Al-Subaie	(Saudi Arabia) Al-Najma	None	

== Pre-season ==
30 July 2025 Friendly	Al-Hazem (Saudi Arabia)	1–2	(Qatar) Al-Waab	Adapazarı, Turkey
18:00 TRT			Gueye 45'; Fowadah 75'	Stadium: Sakarya Atatürk Stadium

3 August 2025 Friendly	Al-Hazem (Saudi Arabia)	2–0	(Qatar) Al-Markhiya	Adapazarı, Turkey
17:30 TRT	Al-Shammari; Al-Habashi	Report		Stadium: Sakarya Atatürk Stadium

8 August 2025 Friendly	Al-Hazem (Saudi Arabia)	2–0	(Bahrain) Al-Khaldiya	Derince, Turkey
17:30 TRT	Al-Shammari,	Report		Stadium: Derince Suni Çim Stadı

11 August 2025 Friendly	Al-Hazem (Saudi Arabia)	1–1	(Saudi Arabia) Al-Najma	Derince, Turkey
17:30 TRT			Al-Nakhli	Stadium: Derince Suni Çim Stadı

21 August 2025 Friendly	Al-Hazem (Saudi Arabia)	1–1	(Saudi Arabia) Al-Najma	Ar Rass, Saudi Arabia
19:30 AST			Quioto	Stadium: Al-Hazem Club Stadium

== Competitions ==
=== Overview ===
Competition	Record							
Competition	Pld	W	D	L	GF	GA	GD	Win %
Pro League	18	5	5	8	19	34	−15	27.78
King's Cup	2	1	0	1	3	4	−1	50.00
Total	20	6	5	9	22	38	−16	30.00

Updated to match played 29 January 2026
Source: Competitions

=== Pro League ===
==== League table ====
Pos	Team	Pld	W	D	L	GF	GA	GD	Pts	Qualification or relegation
7	Al-Ettifaq	34	14	8	12	51	55	−4	50	Qualification for GFF Gulf Club Champions League group stage
8	Neom	34	12	9	13	43	48	−5	45	Qualification for GFF Gulf Club Champions League group stage
9	Al-Hazem	34	11	9	14	38	57	−19	42	
10	Al-Fayha	34	10	8	16	41	54	−13	38	
11	Al-Fateh	34	9	10	15	41	55	−14	37	

Source: SPL
Rules for classification: 1) Points; 2) Head-to-head points; 3) Head-to-head goal difference; 4) Total goal difference; 5) Total goals scored; 6) Fair-play points
(Note: Head-to-head record is used only after all the matches between the teams in question have been played).

==== Results summary ====
Overall								Home						Away					
Pld	W	D	L	GF	GA	GD	Pts	W	D	L	GF	GA	GD	W	D	L	GF	GA	GD
18	5	5	8	19	34	−15	20	2	1	6	8	22	−14	3	4	2	11	12	−1

Last updated: 29 January 2026.
Source: Saudi Pro League

==== Results by round ====
Round	1	2	3	4	5	6	7	8	9	11	12	13	14	15	16	17	18	19	20	21	22	23	10	24	25	26	27	28	29	30	31	32	33	34
Ground	A	A	H	H	A	H	A	H	A	A	A	H	A	H	H	A	H	H	A	A	H	A	H	H	A	H	A	H	H	A	H	A	A	H
Result	D	L	D	L	W	L	D	L	W	D	W	L	L	W	L	D	W	L																
Position	9	14	14	14	12	14	13	14	12	11	10	11	12	11	11	11	11	12																

Updated to match(es) played on 30 January 2026. Source: Saudi Pro League
A = Away; H = Home; W = Win; D = Draw; L = Loss

==== Matches ====
All times are local, AST (UTC+3).

Win Draw Loss Postponed

28 August 2025 1	Damac	1–1	Al-Hazem	Khamis Mushait
19:05	Méïté (yellow card) 34'; Al-Samiri (yellow card) 45+1'; Alioui (yellow card) 73'; H. Al-Ghamdi (yellow card) 90+5'; Harkass 90+8'	Report	Al-Yami (yellow card) 23'; Martins 57' (pen.); Mokwana (yellow card) 89'; Al-Harbi (yellow card) 90+9'	Stadium: Damac Club Stadium; Attendance: 373; Referee: Sami Al-Jires

12 September 2025 2	Al-Shabab	1–0	Al-Hazem	Riyadh
18:35	Carrasco 64'; Al-Rajeh (yellow card) 70'; Hernández (yellow card) 86'	Report	Al-Nakhli (yellow card) 12' (yellow-red card) 32'; Al-Harbi (yellow card) 18'; Martins (yellow card) 42'	Stadium: Al-Shabab Club Stadium; Attendance: 3,647; Referee: Majed Al-Shamrani

20 September 2025 3	Al-Hazem	0–0	Al-Fateh	Ar Rass
18:40	Al-Shanqiti (yellow card) 16'; Al-Rashed (yellow card) 47'	Report	Qasheesh (yellow card) 48'; Youssouf (yellow card) 52'	Stadium: Al-Hazem Club Stadium; Attendance: 1,406; Referee: Ahmed Al-Rumaikhani

26 September 2025 4	Al-Hazem	0–2	Al-Ahli	Buraidah
18:35	Al-Harbi (yellow card) 68'; Al-Dakheel (yellow card) 90+3'	Report	Gonçalves (yellow card) 20'; Al-Buraikan 72'; Majrashi 80'	Stadium: King Abdullah Sports City; Attendance: 1,612; Referee: Andris Treimanis (Latvia)

18 October 2025 5	Al-Okhdood	1–2	Al-Hazem	Najran
18:15	Hawsawi 33'; Narey (yellow card) 46'; Pedroza (yellow card) 69'	Report	haba 20'; Al-Nakhli 40'; Mokwana (yellow card) 57'; Varela (yellow card) 83'	Stadium: Prince Hathloul bin Abdulaziz Sports City; Attendance: 1,788; Referee: Mohammed Al-Ismail

25 October 2025 6	Al-Hazem	0–2	Al-Nassr	Buraidah
21:00	Al Somah (yellow card) 33'; Al-Dakheel (yellow card) 44'; Al-Nakhli (yellow card) 48'	Report	Mané (yellow card) 13'; Al-Khaibari (yellow card) 24'; Félix 25'; Ronaldo 88'	Stadium: King Abdullah Sports City; Attendance: 10,520; Referee: Faisal Al-Blwi

31 October 2025 7	Al-Ettifaq	2–2	Al-Hazem	Dammam
20:30	Al-Ghannam 14'; Medrán (yellow card) 41'; Calvo (yellow card) 46'; Dembélé (red card) 57'; Nkota 90'	Report	Al-Dakheel (yellow card) 54'; Martins 63'; Al Somah 65'; Al-Khaibari (yellow card) 89'	Stadium: EGO Stadium; Attendance: 2,959; Referee: Ali Al-Qahtani

6 November 2025 8	Al-Hazem	1–4	Al-Khaleej	Buraidah
17:55	Martins 38', (yellow card) 44'; Mokwana (yellow card) 44'; Boutouil (yellow card) 54'; Al-Habshi (yellow card) 65'	Report	Fortounis 8'; Al Hamsal (yellow card) 16'; Kourbelis (yellow card) 41'; Fernandes (yellow card) 45' (yellow-red card) 59', (goal) 58' (pen.); Masouras 45+1', 75'	Stadium: King Abdullah Sports City; Attendance: 1,064; Referee: Mohammed Abu Shaqarah

21 November 2025 9	Al-Kholood	1–2	Al-Hazem	Ar Rass
17:50	Enrique 3'; Gyömbér (yellow card) 36'	Report	Mokwana 30'; Al Somah 37' (pen.); Al-Sayyali (yellow card) 43'; Rosier (yellow card) 49'; Al-Dakheel (yellow card) 87'	Stadium: Al-Hazem Club Stadium; Attendance: 3,583; Referee: Khalid Al-Turais

25 December 2025 11	Al-Fayha	0–0	Al-Hazem	Al Majma'ah
17:50	Ganvoula (yellow card) 42'; Villanueva (yellow card) 74'	Report	Al-Rashed (yellow card) 17'; Tunkar (yellow card) 43'; Al-Dhuwayhi (yellow card) 63'	Stadium: Al-Majma'ah Sports City Stadium; Attendance: 647; Referee: Raed Al-Zahrani

29 December 2025 12	Al-Riyadh	1–2	Al-Hazem	Riyadh
20:30	Sylla (yellow card) 13', (goal) 54'; Okou (yellow card) 74'	Report	Eisa (yellow card) 8'; Al-Habshi 31'; Tunkar (yellow card) 34'; Al Somah 50'; Boutouil (yellow card) 69'; Varela (yellow card) 90+1'; Sayoud (yellow card) 90+4'	Stadium: Prince Faisal bin Fahd Sports City Stadium; Attendance: 1,044; Referee: Abdullah Al-Harbi

4 January 2026 13	Al-Hazem	1–2	Neom	Ar Rass
18:05	Sayoud 90+5' (pen.)	Report	Al-Asmari (yellow card) 31'; Lacazette 59'; Rodríguez 88'	Stadium: Al-Hazem Club Stadium; Attendance: 1,044; Referee: Khaled Al-Ahmari

8 January 2026 14	Al-Hilal	3–0	Al-Hazem	Riyadh
17:55	Milinković-Savić 29'; Neves 56'; Núñez 90'	Report		Stadium: Kingdom Arena; Attendance: 14,920; Referee: Glenn Nyberg (Sweden)

12 January 2026 15	Al-Hazem	3–2	Al-Najma	Ar Rass
18:10	Tunkar (yellow card) 42'; Boutouil (yellow card) 47'; Sayoud 58', 90+6', (yellow card) 81'; Al-Shammari 90+8', (yellow card) 90+8'	Report	Tijanić 8'; Al-Haleel (yellow card) 26'; Al-Tulayhi 43'	Stadium: Al-Hazem Club Stadium; Attendance: 1,024; Referee: Majed Al-Shamrani

18 January 2026 16	Al-Hazem	1–5	Al-Qadsiah	Buraidah
18:15	Al-Dakheel (yellow card) 33'; Al-Habshi (yellow card) 53'; Bah 86'	Report	Retegui 56'; Al-Juwayr 61'; Quiñones 73'; Al-Nakhli 81' (o.g.); Thakri (yellow card) 88'; Abu Al-Shamat 90+4'	Stadium: King Abdullah Sports City; Attendance: 1,371; Referee: Kirill Levnikov (Russia)

22 January 2026 17	Al-Taawoun	2–2	Al-Hazem	Buraidah
18:15	Martínez 23', 85'; Al-Alaeli (yellow card) 51'	Report	Martins 49'; Al-Shammari 55'; Al-Rashed (yellow card) 58'	Stadium: Al-Taawoun Club Stadium; Attendance: 3,501; Referee: Ali Al-Qahtani

26 January 2026 18	Al-Hazem	2–1	Damac	Ar Rass
18:20	Al-Shanqiti (yellow card) 57'; Kewin 80' (o.g.); Al-Dakheel 87'; Al-Shamrani (yellow card) 90+5'	Report	Al-Anazi (yellow card) 27'; Al-Samiri (yellow card) 36'; Kewin (yellow card) 37'; Al-Khaibari (yellow card) 45+8'; Bedrane 49'; Méïté (yellow card) 72'	Stadium: Al-Hazem Club Stadium; Attendance: 1,114; Referee: Abdullah Zarban

29 January 2026 19	Al-Hazem	0–4	Al-Shabab	Ar Rass
20:30	Al-Rashed (yellow card) 32' (yellow-red card) 39'; Al-Dakheel (yellow card) 60'	Report	Carlos 51', 65', 89', (yellow card) 90'; Brownhill 75' (pen.)	Stadium: Al-Hazem Club Stadium; Attendance: 2,464; Referee: Shukri Al-Hanfoush

20 December 2025 10	Al-Hazem	v	Al-Ittihad	Buraidah
20:30				Stadium: King Abdullah Sports City

=== King's Cup ===
All times are local, AST (UTC+3).

23 September 2025 Round of 32	Al-Hazem	2–1	Neom	Ar Rass
18:35	Al Somah 5', 62', (yellow card) 82'; Al-Harbi (yellow card) 47'	Report	Lacazette 26'; Al-Breik (yellow card) 59'	Stadium: Al-Hazem Club Stadium; Referee: Mamdouh Al Shahdan

28 October 2025 Round of 16	Al-Qadsiah	3–1	Al-Hazem	Dammam
17:35	Retegui 22', (yellow card) 86'; Al-Shahrani (yellow card) 41'; Quiñones 54', 63' (pen.); Nacho (yellow card) 87'	Report	Al-Habshi 9'; Tunkar (yellow card) 49'	Stadium: Prince Mohamed bin Fahd Stadium; Attendance: 4,537; Referee: João Pinheiro (Portugal)

== Statistics ==
=== Appearances ===
Last updated on 29 January 2026.

No.	Pos	Nat	Player	Total		Pro League		King's Cup	
No.	Pos	Nat	Player	Apps	Goals	Apps	Goals	Apps	Goals
Goalkeepers
14	GK	(Cape Verde) CPV	Bruno Varela	18	0	18	0	0	0
23	GK	(Saudi Arabia) KSA	Ibrahim Zaid	2	0	0	0	2	0
Defenders
2	DF	(Saudi Arabia) KSA	Saud Al-Rashed	12	0	8+3	0	1	0
3	DF	(Morocco) MAR	Abdelmounaim Boutouil	9	0	6+2	0	1	0
4	DF	(Saudi Arabia) KSA	Sultan Tankar	17	0	14+1	0	2	0
13	DF	(Saudi Arabia) KSA	Abdullah Al-Shanqiti	13	0	7+4	0	1+1	0
27	DF	(Saudi Arabia) KSA	Ahmed Al-Nakhli	19	1	17	1	1+1	0
34	DF	(Saudi Arabia) KSA	Abdulrahman Al-Dakheel	13	1	11+1	1	1	0
66	DF	(Saudi Arabia) KSA	Sultan Al-Eissa	2	0	0+2	0	0	0
82	DF	(Saudi Arabia) KSA	Abdulaziz Al-Harbi	11	0	8+2	0	1	0
Midfielders
5	MF	(Saudi Arabia) KSA	Mohammed Al-Yami	8	0	4+4	0	0	0
8	MF	(Saudi Arabia) KSA	Abdulhadi Al-Harajin	4	0	0+3	0	0+1	0
10	MF	(Portugal) POR	Fábio Martins	19	4	16+2	4	0+1	0
11	MF	(Algeria) ALG	Amir Sayoud	18	3	10+6	3	0+2	0
15	MF	(Saudi Arabia) KSA	Abdulrahman Al-Khaibari	3	0	1+2	0	0	0
17	MF	(South Africa) RSA	Elias Mokwana	13	1	7+4	1	1+1	0
19	MF	(Saudi Arabia) KSA	Nawaf Al-Habashi	18	3	10+7	2	1	1
24	MF	(Guinea) GUI	Aboubacar Bah	12	1	8+3	1	0+1	0
26	MF	(Saudi Arabia) KSA	Abdulaziz Al-Dhuwayhi	7	0	2+4	0	1	0
32	MF	(France) FRA	Loreintz Rosier	20	0	18	0	2	0
45	MF	(Saudi Arabia) KSA	Mohammed Al-Saedi	1	0	0+1	0	0	0
70	MF	(Saudi Arabia) KSA	Ahmed Al-Shamrani	10	0	2+7	0	1	0
80	MF	(Spain) ESP	Miguel Carvalho	14	0	5+7	0	2	0
Forwards
7	FW	(Saudi Arabia) KSA	Yousef Al-Shammari	9	2	6+3	2	0	0
9	FW	(Syria) SYR	Omar Al Somah	13	5	7+4	3	2	2
20	FW	(Saudi Arabia) KSA	Nawaf Al-Bishri	0	0	0	0	0	0
Players sent out on loan this season
77	DF	(Saudi Arabia) KSA	Khalid Al-Subaie	4	0	0+2	0	1+1	0
Player who made an appearance this season but have left the club
6	MF	(Saudi Arabia) KSA	Basil Al-Sayyali	15	0	13+1	0	1	0

=== Goalscorers ===
Rank	No.	Pos	Nat	Name	Pro League	King Cup	Total
1	9	FW	(Syria)	Omar Al Somah	3	2	5
2	10	MF	(Portugal)	Fábio Martins	4	0	4
3	11	MF	(Algeria)	Amir Sayoud	3	0	3
3	19	MF	(Saudi Arabia)	Nawaf Al-Habashi	2	1	3
5	7	FW	(Saudi Arabia)	Yousef Al-Shammari	2	0	2
6	17	MF	(South Africa)	Elias Mokwana	1	0	1
6	24	MF	(Guinea)	Aboubacar Bah	1	0	1
6	27	DF	(Saudi Arabia)	Ahmed Al-Nakhli	1	0	1
6	34	DF	(Saudi Arabia)	Abdulrahman Al-Dakheel	1	0	1
Own goal					1	0	1
Total					19	3	22

Last Updated: 26 January 2026

=== Assists ===
Rank	No.	Pos	Nat	Name	Pro League	King Cup	Total
1	11	MF	(Algeria)	Amir Sayoud	3	0	3
2	10	MF	(Portugal)	Fábio Martins	2	0	2
2	17	MF	(South Africa)	Elias Mokwana	2	0	2
4	2	DF	(Saudi Arabia)	Saud Al-Rashed	1	0	1
4	6	MF	(Saudi Arabia)	Basil Al-Sayyali	1	0	1
4	9	FW	(Syria)	Omar Al Somah	0	1	1
4	27	DF	(Saudi Arabia)	Ahmed Al-Nakhli	1	0	1
4	70	MF	(Saudi Arabia)	Ahmed Al-Shamrani	0	1	1
4	80	MF	(Spain)	Miguel Carvalho	1	0	1
4	82	DF	(Saudi Arabia)	Abdulaziz Al-Harbi	1	0	1
Total					12	2	14

Last Updated: 26 January 2026

=== Clean sheets ===
Rank	No.	Pos	Nat	Name	Pro League	King Cup	Total
1	14	GK	(Cape Verde)	Bruno Varela	2	0	2
Total					2	0	2

Last Updated: 25 December 2025
