= 2017–18 Prince Mohammad bin Salman League =

Prince Mohammad bin Salman League
- Season: 2017–18
- Champions: Al-Wehda
- Promoted: Al-Wehda; Al-Hazem
- Relegated: Al-Watani
- Matches: 240
- Goals: 689 (2.87 per match)
- Top goalscorer: Mashari Al-Enezi (21 goals)
- Biggest home win: Al-Mujazzel 6–1 Al-Nahda (14 February 2018)
- Biggest away win: Jeddah 1–5 Al-Kawkab (11 October 2017)
- Highest scoring: Al-Qaisumah 4–6 Al-Kawkab (29 November 2017)
- Longest winning run: 5 matches Al-Hazem
- Longest unbeaten run: 9 matches Al-Wehda
- Longest winless run: 10 matches Al-Nojoom
- Longest losing run: 7 matches Najran
- All statistics correct as of 4 May 2018.

The 2017–18 Prince Mohammad bin Salman League was the first season of the Prince Mohammad bin Salman League under its current name, and 41st season of the Saudi First Division since its establishment in 1976. The season started on 12 September 2017 and concluded on 18 April 2018.

== Overview ==
=== First Division rebranding ===
On 19 September 2017, the General Sports Authority announced a rebrand; beginning with the 2017–18 season, the competition was known as the Prince Faisal bin Fahd League. As part of the rebranding, a new logo was introduced. On 9 February 2018, the General Sports Authority once again announced a rebrand; starting from the current season, the competition will be known as the Prince Mohammad bin Salman League.

=== Rule changes ===
On 11 September 2017, the SAFF announced that the numbers of foreign players were increased from 2 players to 3 players. They also announced that the allowed number of substitutions per match was increased from 3 to 5.

== Teams ==
A total of 16 teams are contesting the league, including 11 sides from the 2016–17 season, two relegated from the 2016–17 Professional League, and three promoted from the 2016–17 Second Division.

Al-Kawkab and Jeddah became the first two clubs to be promoted to the First Division, with both clubs finishing as group winners. Al-Mujazzel became the third and final club to be promoted, following a 5–1 win over Al-Ansar on 3 March 2017, to secure their return to the First Division after only a season's absence. Al-Kawkab returned to the First Division for the first time since the 2013–14 season, and Jeddah will play in their first-ever season in the First Division since being re-branded.

On 20 April 2017, Al-Wehda became the first side to be relegated from the Pro League following a 2–1 home defeat to Al-Fateh. This will be Al-Wehda's first season back to the First Division since the 2014–15 season. On 4 May 2017, Al-Khaleej were the 2nd side to be relegated from the Pro League after a 2–2 draw with Al-Faisaly, finishing 13th in the league. This will also be Al-Khaleej's first season return to the First Division since the 2013–14 season.

On 27 April 2017 Wej became the first club to be relegated to the Second Division following 2–1 loss to Hajer. On the final matchday, both Al-Adalh and Al-Jeel were relegated to the Second Division, with both clubs drawing their matches.

== Team changes ==
The following teams have changed division since the 2016–17 season.

=== To Prince Mohammad bin Salman League ===
Promoted from Second Division

- Al-Kawkab
- Jeddah
- Al-Mujazzel

Relegated from Professional League

- Al-Khaleej
- Al-Wehda

=== From Prince Mohammad bin Salman League ===
Relegated to Second Division

- Al-Adalh
- Al-Jeel
- Wej

Promoted to Professional League

- Al-Feiha
- Ohod

== Stadia and locations ==
Locations of teams in the 2017–18 Saudi First Division

Team	Location	Stadium	Capacity
Al-Hazem	Ar Rass	Al-Hazem Club Stadium	2,800
Al-Kawkab	Al-Kharj	Al-Shoulla Club Stadium	5,200
Al-Khaleej	Saihat	Prince Nayef bin Abdulaziz Stadium	10,000
Al-Mujazzal	Al-Majma'ah	King Salman Sport City Stadium	5,200
Al-Nahda	Dammam	Prince Fahd bin Salman Stadium	15,000
Al-Nojoom	Al-Hasa	Prince Abdullah bin Jalawi Stadium	19,096
Al-Orobah	Sakakah	Al-Oruba Club Stadium	7,000
Al-Qaisumah	Qaisumah	Al-Batin Club Stadium	6,000
Al-Shoulla	Al-Saih	Al-Shoulla Club Stadium	5,200
Al-Tai	Ha'il	Prince Abdul Aziz bin Musa'ed Stadium	12,000
Al-Watani	Tabuk	King Khalid Sport City Stadium	20,000
Al-Wehda	Makkah	King Abdul Aziz Stadium	33,195
Damac	Khamis Mushait	Damac Club Stadium	3,556
Hajer	Al-Hasa	Prince Abdullah bin Jalawi Stadium	19,096
Jeddah	Jeddah	Reserve Stadium in King Abdullah Sports City	1,000
Najran	Najran	Prince Sultan bin Abdul Aziz Stadium	20,000

1: Najran will play at Prince Sultan bin Abdul Aziz Stadium due to the ongoing war in Yemen.

== Foreign players ==
Club	Player 1	Player 2	Player 3	Former Players
Al-Hazem	(Algeria) Bouazza Feham	(Guinea) Pato	(Sudan) Saeed Mustafa	(Brazil) Dodô
Al-Kawkab	(Senegal) Emmanuel Gomis	(Senegal) Mignane Diouf		
Al-Khaleej	(Brazil) Gilmar	(Brazil) Jandson	(Senegal) Alioune N'Diaye	(Brazil) Jorginho
Al-Mujazzal	(Brazil) Juninho Aguiar	(Brazil) Morotó		(Brazil) Gabriel Ceará
Al-Nahda	(Benin) Mohamed Aoudou	(South Sudan) Athir Thomas		
Al-Nojoom	(Brazil) Júninho	(Brazil) Tiago Lopes		
Al-Orobah	(Cameroon) Frank Papara	(Guinea) Thierno Diallo		(Brazil) Rogério Martins
Al-Qaisumah	(Brazil) Diego Barboza	(Mali) Ahmad Maiga	(Mali) Souleymane Demba	
Al-Shoulla	(Brazil) Dodô	(Ghana) Sadat Bukari		
Al-Tai	(Cameroon) Aminou Bouba	(Ghana) Ernest Barfo	(Senegal) Fadel Barry	(Brazil) Júninho
Al-Watani	(Mauritania) Mohamed Soudani			(Cameroon) Edy-Nicolas Boyom
Al-Wehda	(Bahrain) Abubaker Khabir			(Algeria) Bouazza Feham
Damac	(Benin) Abdel Fadel Suanon	(Mali) Moussa Tigana	(Senegal) Kemokho Cissoko	
Hajer	(Brazil) Willen Mota	(Tunisia) Houssem Slimène		(Cameroon) Hervé Tchami
Jeddah	(Egypt) Reda El-Weshi	(Egypt) Sherif Ashraf		
Najran				

== League table ==
Pos	Team	Pld	W	D	L	GF	GA	GD	Pts	Promotion, qualification or relegation
1	Al-Wehda (C, P)	30	17	7	6	49	32	+17	58	Promotion to Professional League
2	Al-Hazem (P)	30	15	8	7	50	32	+18	53	Promotion to Professional League
3	Al-Tai	30	15	7	8	52	35	+17	52	Qualification to promotion play-offs
4	Al-Kawkab	30	14	8	8	52	33	+19	50 (Note: Al-Kawkab finished ahead of Hajer on head-to-head points: Al-Kawkab 2–0 Hajer, Hajer 2–2 Al-Kawkab)	Qualification to promotion play-offs
5	Hajer	30	14	8	8	39	35	+4	50	
6	Al-Shoulla	30	11	10	9	42	43	−1	43	
7	Al-Khaleej	30	10	11	9	45	40	+5	41	
8	Al-Qaisumah	30	11	7	12	52	54	−2	40	
9	Damac	30	10	9	11	49	43	+6	39	
10	Al-Orobah	30	9	11	10	36	39	−3	38	
11	Al-Nahda	30	9	8	13	35	50	−15	35	
12	Al-Nojoom	30	6	15	9	34	41	−7	33 (Note: Head-to-head points: Al-Nojoom 8 pts; Al-Mujazzal 4 pts and –1 GD; Najran 4 pts and –2 GD (Al-Nojoom 2–1 Al-Mujazzal, Al-Mujazzal 0–0 Al-Nojoom, Al-Nojoom 2–0 Najran, Najran 1–1 Al-Nojoom, Najran 1–2 Al-Mujazzal, Al-Mujazzal 1–2 Najran).)	
13	Al-Mujazzal	30	10	3	17	39	52	−13	33	
14	Najran (O)	30	9	6	15	39	51	−12	33	Qualification to Relegation play-offs
15	Al-Watani (R)	30	5	12	13	33	48	−15	27	Qualification to Relegation play-offs
16	Jeddah (O)	30	5	10	15	43	61	−18	25	Qualification to Relegation play-offs

Updated to match(es) played on 18 April 2018. Source: kooora.com
Rules for classification: 1) Points; 2) Head-to-head points; 3) Head-to-head goal difference; 4) Total goal difference; 5) Total goals scored; 6) Play-off (only for deciding champion, promotion and relegation).
(C) Champions; (O) Play-off winners; (P) Promoted; (R) Relegated

=== Positions by round ===
The table lists the positions of teams after each week of matches. In order to preserve chronological evolvements, any postponed matches are not included in the round at which they were originally scheduled but added to the full round they were played immediately afterward.

Team ╲ Round	1	2	3	4	5	6	7	8	9	10	11	12	13	14	15	16	17	18	19	20	21	22	23	24	25	26	27	28	29	30
Al-Wehda	4	1	4	6	3	6	5	7	4	2	2	1	1	1	1	1	1	1	1	1	1	1	1	2	1	1	1	1	1	1
Al-Hazem	13	11	11	5	7	4	7	8	3	5	3	2	2	2	2	2	2	2	2	2	2	2	2	1	2	2	2	2	3	2
Al-Tai	3	8	2	2	2	1	1	1	1	1	1	3	3	3	3	3	3	3	3	3	4	4	4	3	3	3	3	3	2	3
Al-Kawkab	10	9	9	12	8	11	13	14	14	13	13	10	8	10	8	6	5	6	4	4	3	3	3	5	4	4	4	4	4	4
Hajer	8	14	14	15	14	13	9	5	6	3	5	5	4	4	5	8	8	8	8	8	7	6	6	6	6	5	5	5	5	5
Al-Shoulla	6	3	3	9	11	10	8	2	5	7	9	7	5	5	6	4	7	5	7	6	5	5	5	4	5	6	7	6	6	6
Al-Khaleej	2	7	7	4	5	5	2	3	2	4	4	6	7	9	11	11	12	14	15	12	9	8	7	7	7	7	6	7	7	7
Al-Qaisumah	12	5	8	3	4	7	3	6	9	10	10	13	14	11	9	7	6	7	6	5	6	7	9	9	9	8	8	8	10	8
Damac	7	13	12	14	15	15	16	16	16	15	14	15	13	14	16	14	13	15	13	13	14	11	11	10	10	10	10	10	8	9
Al-Orobah	1	4	1	1	1	2	4	4	7	6	7	4	6	6	4	5	4	4	5	7	8	9	8	8	8	9	9	9	9	10
Al-Nahda	5	2	5	10	6	3	6	10	11	12	12	11	10	8	7	9	9	9	9	9	11	12	12	11	11	13	12	13	13	11
Al-Nojoom	9	6	6	7	9	9	12	11	10	11	11	14	15	15	13	16	14	11	10	11	13	14	14	12	12	12	11	11	11	12
Al-Mujazzal	16	16	10	13	12	14	10	12	13	14	15	12	11	12	12	13	15	12	11	14	10	10	10	13	13	11	13	12	12	13
Najran	15	12	13	8	10	12	14	13	12	9	6	8	9	7	10	10	11	13	14	15	16	15	16	16	15	16	14	14	14	14
Al-Watani	14	15	16	11	13	8	11	9	8	8	8	9	12	13	14	12	10	10	12	10	12	13	13	14	14	14	15	15	15	15
Jeddah	11	10	15	16	16	16	15	15	15	16	16	16	16	16	15	15	16	16	16	16	15	16	15	15	16	15	16	16	16	16

Leader
Promotion to 2018–19 Saudi Professional League
Relegation to 2018–19 Second Division

Updated to match(es) played on 18 April 2018. Source:

== Results ==
Home \ Away	HAZ	KAW	KHJ	MUJ	NAH	NOJ	ORO	QAI	SHO	TAI	WAT	WHD	DAM	HJR	JED	NAJ
Al-Hazem		1–1	2–2	4–1	3–2	2–0	1–1	5–2	3–1	2–2	3–0	2–0	0–1	3–0	2–0	2–1
Al-Kawkab	0–1		2–3	4–1	3–0	2–0	2–1	2–1	1–0	0–1	2–1	0–1	3–0	2–0	1–1	3–3
Al-Khaleej	2–1	0–2		1–0	3–3	2–2	0–0	2–1	3–2	1–2	1–0	1–1	3–0	1–3	5–1	1–1
Al-Mujazzal	0–1	3–2	0–0		6–1	0–0	1–0	1–2	1–4	2–0	1–0	2–2	1–3	1–2	2–0	1–2
Al-Nahda	0–0	3–2	0–1	3–2		2–0	1–0	1–1	0–1	1–1	2–3	1–3	2–2	0–1	1–1	2–1
Al-Nojoom	4–1	3–2	2–2	2–1	0–0		1–1	0–0	1–2	0–1	0–0	0–1	1–1	1–0	2–2	2–0
Al-Orobah	1–0	0–0	3–2	3–0	1–2	2–2		3–1	3–3	1–0	2–1	3–1	1–1	2–3	1–1	2–2
Al-Qaisumah	1–1	4–6	2–0	2–1	4–1	0–0	4–0		0–1	0–1	2–0	4–3	4–3	1–2	2–2	0–3
Al-Shoulla	0–1	0–0	2–1	2–0	1–0	2–2	0–0	2–2		0–0	2–2	1–2	1–1	3–1	4–3	2–3
Al-Tai	3–1	0–1	0–3	3–1	1–2	5–2	3–0	3–2	5–0		2–2	1–2	3–2	2–0	3–1	4–1
Al-Watani	2–2	1–1	1–1	2–3	1–2	2–2	1–1	0–2	1–1	1–1		1–0	2–2	1–0	2–1	3–1
Al-Wehda	2–1	0–0	1–0	2–0	3–0	1–2	1–0	2–3	2–0	2–0	2–1		3–1	1–1	2–2	3–2
Damac	2–0	1–0	2–2	1–2	0–0	3–0	1–2	6–1	1–2	1–1	2–0	0–2		2–1	4–0	0–1
Hajer	0–0	2–2	2–1	2–1	2–0	1–1	2–0	1–0	1–1	2–1	3–2	0–0	2–2		1–1	1–0
Jeddah	1–3	1–5	1–1	1–2	1–2	2–1	1–0	1–1	1–2	2–2	4–0	2–3	2–0	1–2		3–1
Najran	0–2	0–1	1–0	1–2	2–1	1–1	1–2	1–3	2–0	0–1	0–0	1–1	1–4	2–1	4–3	

Updated to match(es) played on 18 April 2018. Source:
Legend: Blue = home team win; Yellow = draw; Red = away team win.

=== Season progress ===
Team ╲ Round	1	2	3	4	5	6	7	8	9	10	11	12	13	14	15	16	17	18	19	20	21	22	23	24	25	26	27	28	29	30
Al-Hazem	D	D	D	W	D	W	L	D	W	D	W	W	L	W	W	W	L	W	W	W	W	W	L	W	L	D	L	L	D	W
Al-Kawkab	D	D	D	L	W	L	L	L	W	D	L	W	W	L	W	W	W	L	W	D	W	W	W	L	W	D	W	D	W	D
Al-Khaleej	W	D	L	W	D	D	W	D	W	L	D	L	L	L	D	D	W	W	L	D	W	D	W	L	D	W	W	L	D	L
Al-Mujazzal	L	L	W	L	W	L	W	L	D	L	L	W	W	L	L	D	L	W	W	L	W	L	L	L	L	W	L	W	D	L
Al-Nahda	D	W	D	L	W	W	L	L	L	L	D	D	W	W	D	D	L	L	D	W	L	L	L	W	L	L	W	D	L	W
Al-Nojoom	D	W	D	L	D	D	L	W	D	L	D	L	D	D	D	L	D	W	W	D	L	L	L	W	D	D	W	D	D	L
Al-Orobah	W	D	W	W	L	D	L	D	L	W	L	W	L	D	W	D	W	L	L	L	D	L	W	W	D	D	L	D	D	D
Al-Qaisumah	D	W	L	W	D	L	W	W	L	D	L	L	D	W	W	L	W	W	D	L	L	L	W	W	D	L	L	D	L	W
Al-Shoulla	D	W	D	L	D	D	W	W	D	L	L	W	W	D	L	W	D	D	L	W	D	W	W	W	L	L	L	W	L	D
Al-Tai	W	L	W	W	L	W	W	D	D	D	W	L	L	D	W	W	L	L	D	W	L	W	W	D	W	W	W	D	W	L
Al-Watani	L	L	D	W	D	W	L	W	D	D	D	D	L	L	L	D	W	D	L	W	L	D	L	D	L	D	L	L	D	L
Al-Wehda	D	W	D	W	W	L	W	L	W	W	W	D	W	W	D	W	W	W	L	W	W	L	L	L	W	W	D	D	D	W
Damac	D	L	D	L	L	D	L	D	L	W	W	D	W	L	L	D	D	W	W	L	L	W	L	W	D	L	W	W	W	D
Hajer	D	L	D	L	D	W	W	W	D	W	L	D	W	D	L	L	D	L	W	L	W	W	W	L	W	W	D	W	W	W
Jeddah	D	D	L	L	L	D	W	L	L	D	W	D	L	D	W	L	L	L	D	D	W	L	W	L	D	D	L	L	L	L
Najran	L	D	D	W	D	L	L	D	W	W	W	L	L	W	L	L	L	L	L	L	L	W	L	L	W	L	W	D	D	W

Updated to match(es) played on 18 April 2018. Source:
W = Win; D = Draw; L = Lose

== Relegation play-offs ==
On March 7, 2018, the Saudi Football Federation announced that the number of teams in the Prince Mohammad bin Salman League will be increased from 16 teams to 20 teams. The relegation was removed and in its place, they announced a relegation play-off. The bottom 3 teams will face the 4th place team in each group and the best 5th team in a two-legged match.

Team 1	Agg.	Team 2	1st leg	2nd leg
Najran	2–1	Al-Muzahimiyyah	0–0	2–1
Al-Watani	1–2	Abha	1–1	0–1
Jeddah	3–3 (4–1 p)	Al-Taqadom	2–1	1–2 (a.e.t.)

27 April 2018
19:10 UTC+3

Najran	0–0	Al-Muzahimiyyah

Prince Sultan bin Abdul Aziz Stadium, Abha
Referee: Majed Al-Shamrani
11 May 2018
20:45 UTC+3

Al-Muzahimiyyah	1–2	Najran
Al Mushait 87'	Report	Al Hamsal 9'; Al Abbas 51'

Prince Faisal bin Fahd Stadium, Riyadh
Referee: Mohammed Al-Hoaish

Najran won 2–1 on aggregate.

27 April 2018
19:45 UTC+3

Al-Watani	1–1	Abha
Saeed 50'	Report	Abo Hathrah 60'

King Khalid Sport City Stadium, Tabuk
Referee: Sami Al-Jires
4 May 2018
19:10 UTC+3

Abha	1–0	Al-Watani
Nasser 61'

Prince Sultan bin Abdul Aziz Stadium, Abha
Referee: Majed Al-Shamrani

Abha won 2–1 on aggregate.

26 April 2018
20:45 UTC+3

Jeddah	2–1	Al-Taqadom
Mesawi 1'; Omar 24'	Report	Al-Boqami 57'

Reserve Stadium in King Abdullah Sports City, Jeddah
Referee: Abdulrahman Al-Shehri
4 May 2018
19:15 UTC+3

Al-Taqadom	2–1 (a.e.t.)	Jeddah
Al-Dossari 35'; Al-Harbi 90+3'		Fallatah 90' (pen.)
Penalties
Al-Attas (penalty scored); Fayed (penalty missed); Al-Boqami (penalty missed)	1–4	(penalty scored) El-Weshi; (penalty scored) Al-Suwailem; (penalty scored) Omar; (penalty scored) Al-Sayed

Al-Najma Club Stadium, Unaizah
Referee: Mohammed Al-Smail

3–3 on aggregate. Jeddah won 4–1 on penalties.

== Statistics ==
=== Scoring ===
==== Top scorers ====
As of 18 April 2018

Rank	Player	Club	Goals
1	(Saudi Arabia) Mashari Al-Enezi	Al-Tai	21
2	(Saudi Arabia) Saleh Al Abbas	Najran	18
3	(Brazil) Sidevaldo	Al-Mujazzal	17
4	(Egypt) Reda El-Weshi	Jeddah	14
4	(Burkina Faso) Haron Eisa	Al-Watani	14
6	(Saudi Arabia) Mohammed Rawaf	Al-Orobah	13
7	(Senegal) Mignane Diouf	Al-Kawkab	12
7	(Saudi Arabia) Fahad Hadl	Al-Qaisumah	12
7	(Saudi Arabia) Ali Khormi	Al-Hazem	12
7	(Saudi Arabia) Hassan Sharahili	Damac	12

==== Hat-tricks ====
Player	For	Against	Result	Date	Ref.
(Senegal) Mignane Diouf	Al-Kawkab	Jeddah	5–1 (A)	11 October 2017	
(Chad) Maher Sharoma	Al-Nojoom	Al-Kawkab	3–2 (H)	2 November 2017	
(Saudi Arabia) Ali Khormi	Al-Hazem	Al-Qaisumah	5–2 (H)	11 January 2018	
(Guinea) Ousmane Barry	Al-Hazem	Al-Nahda	3–2 (H)	3 February 2018	
(Saudi Arabia) Hassan Sharahili	Damac	Al-Qaisumah	6–1 (H)	11 April 2018	
(Saudi Arabia) Saleh Al Abbas	Najran	Jeddah	4–3 (H)	18 April 2018	

=== Clean sheets ===
As of 18 April 2018

Rank	Player	Club	Clean sheets
1	(Saudi Arabia) Dawod Al Saeed	Al-Hazem	11
1	(Saudi Arabia) Abdullah Al-Jadaani	Al-Wehda	11
1	(Saudi Arabia) Yahia Al-Shehri	Al-Kawkab	11
4	(Saudi Arabia) Abdulmajeed Al-Thunayan	Damac	7
5	(Saudi Arabia) Mohammed Rabee	Al-Orobah	6
5	(Saudi Arabia) Saeed Al-Harbi	Al-Shoulla	6
5	(Saudi Arabia) Abdulaziz Takrouni	Al-Tai	6
5	(Saudi Arabia) Mohammed Al-Breh	Al-Qaisumah	6
9	(Saudi Arabia) Fares Al-Shammeri	Al-Mujazzal	5
9	(Saudi Arabia) Sultan Al-Shammeri	Al-Khaleej	5
