= 2018–19 Saudi Pro League =

43rd season of Saudi Professional League

Saudi Pro League
- Season: 2018–19
- Dates: 30 August 2018 – 16 May 2019
- Champions: Al-Nassr (9th title)
- Relegated: Al-Qadsiah; Al-Batin; Ohod
- AFC Champions League: Al-Nassr; Al-Hilal; Al-Taawoun; Al-Ahli
- Arab Club Champions Cup: Al-Shabab; Al-Ittihad
- Matches: 240
- Goals: 706 (2.94 per match)
- Top goalscorer: Abderrazak Hamdallah (34 goals)
- Biggest home win: Al-Nassr 5–0 Al-Fateh (18 April 2019); Al-Ahli 5–0 Al-Ettifaq (16 May 2019)
- Biggest away win: Al-Batin 0–5 Al-Taawoun (26 October 2018); Al-Raed 0–5 Al-Nassr (4 April 2019)
- Highest scoring: Al-Ahli 4–5 Al-Raed (28 March 2019)
- Longest winning run: 9 matches Al-Hilal
- Longest unbeaten run: 12 matches Al-Hilal
- Longest winless run: 12 matches Al-Ittihad
- Longest losing run: 8 matches Ohod
- Highest attendance: 59,174; Al-Nassr 2–1 Al-Batin (16 May 2019)
- Lowest attendance: 420; Al-Qadsiah 4–2 Ohod (5 April 2019)
- Average attendance: 8,355
- All statistics correct as of 16 May 2019.

The 2018–19 Saudi Pro League was the 44th edition of the top-tier Saudi football league, established in 1974, and the 11th edition since it was rebranded as the Saudi Pro League in 2008. the season started on 30 August 2018 and concluded on 16 May 2019.

Al-Hilal were the defending champions after winning the Pro League last season for the 15th time. Al-Wehda and Al-Hazem have entered as the promoted teams from the 2017–18 Prince Mohammad bin Salman League. Al-Nassr were crowned as league winners for the 8th time on 16 May, after defeating Al-Batin 2–1 on the final day of the season.

Ohod were the first team to be relegated after a 3–1 defeat to Al-Fayha on 12 April 2019. Al-Batin were the second team to be relegated following their 1–0 defeat to an already relegated Ohod. Al-Qadsiah were the third and final team to be relegated after a draw against Al-Hazem on the final day of the season.

Abderrazak Hamdallah from Al-Nassr was the top scorer with 34 goals, and was also named Player of the Season. Pedro Emanuel of Al-Taawoun won the Manager of the Season award.

== Changes ==
On 7 March 2018, the Saudi FF announced that the league would be increased from 14 teams to 16 teams. They also announced new rules limiting the club's squad size to 28 players.

== Teams ==
Locations of teams in the 2018–19 Saudi Professional League

Sixteen teams competed in the league – the top twelve teams from the previous season, the two play-off winners and two teams promoted from the 2017–18 Prince Mohammad bin Salman League.

Teams who were promoted to the Pro League

The first club to be promoted was Al-Wehda, following their 2–2 draw away to Al-Mujazzal on 11 April 2018. Al-Wehda will play in the top flight of Saudi football after a season absence. They were crowned champions on 18 April 2018 after beating Al-Khaleej 1–0 at home.

The second club to be promoted was Al-Hazem, following their 4–1 win at home against Al-Mujazzal on 18 April 2017, coupled with Al-Tai's defeat against Hajer. Al-Hazem will play in the top flight of Saudi football for the first time since 2010–11.

Teams who were relegated to the MS League

No teams were relegated to the Prince Mohammad bin Salman League. Due to an increase in the number of teams, the Saudi FF announced that the relegation was canceled and in its place was a relegation play-off. Both Pro League teams, Al-Raed and Ohod, won the playoffs and secured their top-flight status.

=== Stadiums ===
Note: Table lists in alphabetical order.

Team	Location	Stadium	Capacity
Al-Ahli	Jeddah	King Abdullah Sports City	62,000
Al-Batin	Hafar al-Batin	Al-Batin Club Stadium	6,000
Al-Ettifaq	Dammam	Prince Mohamed bin Fahd Stadium	21,701
Al-Faisaly	Harmah	King Salman Sport City Stadium	5,200
Al-Fateh	Al-Hasa	Prince Abdullah bin Jalawi Stadium	19,096
Al-Fayha	Al Majma'ah	King Salman Sport City Stadium	5,200
Al-Hazem	Ar Rass	Al-Hazem Club Stadium	2,800
Al-Hilal	Riyadh	King Saud University Stadium	25,000
Al-Ittihad	Jeddah	King Abdullah Sports City	62,000
Al-Nassr	Riyadh	King Fahd International Stadium	62,685
Al-Qadsiah	Khobar	Prince Saud bin Jalawi Stadium	11,000
Al-Raed	Buraidah	King Abdullah Sport City Stadium	23,600
Al-Shabab	Riyadh	King Fahd International Stadium	62,685
Al-Taawoun	Buraidah	King Abdullah Sport City Stadium	23,600
Al-Wehda	Mecca	King Abdul Aziz Stadium	33,195
Ohod	Medina	Prince Mohammed bin Abdul Aziz Stadium	24,000

1: Al-Faisaly play their home games in Al-Majma'ah.
2: Al-Hilal, Al-Nassr and Al-Shabab also use Prince Faisal bin Fahd Stadium (22,500 seats) as a home stadium.
3: Al-Hilal also use King Fahd International Stadium (62,685 seats) as a home stadium.

=== Personnel and kits ===
Team	Manager	Captain	Kit manufacturer	Shirt sponsor
Al-Ahli	(Saudi Arabia) Yousef Anbar (caretaker)	(Saudi Arabia) Hussein Abdulghani	Umbro	Saudia, Almosafer^{1}, BOGA^{3}
Al-Batin	(Romania) Ciprian Panait	(Saudi Arabia) Mohanna Waqes	Givova	Gree Electric, Al Asasyah^{1}, Rayat Al Shalal Hotel^{1}, Al-Maali Hospital^{2}
Al-Ettifaq	(Portugal) Hélder (caretaker)	(Slovakia) Filip Kiss	Jako	Almana General Hospital, Al-Majdouie Hyundai, Goodyear^{1}, Yaumi^{1}, Innosoft^{2}, APSCO Mobil 1^{2}, Kanaf^{3}
Al-Faisaly	(Saudi Arabia) Al-Homaidy Al-Otaibi (caretaker)	(Saudi Arabia) Omar Abdulaziz	Adidas	ALDREES, Roco, Al Riyadh Travel & Tourism^{1}, Shmagh Albassam^{1}, Al Wefaq^{2}, Al Tazaj^{3}
Al-Fateh	(Tunisia) Fathi Al-Jabal	(Saudi Arabia) Mohammed Al-Fuhaid	Offside	Al Kifah^{1}, AlMoosa Hospital^{1}
Al-Fayha	(Algeria) Noureddine Zekri	(Saudi Arabia) Sami Al-Khaibari	Skillano	Shawarmer, The Fourth Triangle
Al-Hazem	(Romania) Daniel Isăilă	(Saudi Arabia) Khaled Al-Barakah	ProIcon	Cabrito, RAKAA Holding^{1}
Al-Hilal	(Brazil) Péricles Chamusca (caretaker)	(Saudi Arabia) Salman Al-Faraj	Nike	Kingdom Holding Company, Abdul Samad Al Qurashi^{1}, Sun & Sand Sports^{1}, Jawwy from STC^{2}, APSCO Mobil 1^{2}
Al-Ittihad	(Chile) José Luis Sierra	(Morocco) Karim El Ahmadi	Joma	Noon, APSCO Mobil 1^{2}
Al-Nassr	(Portugal) Rui Vitória	(Saudi Arabia) Ibrahim Ghaleb	Sporta	Etihad Airways
Al-Qadsiah	(Tunisia) Nacif Beyaoui	(Brazil) Élton Arábia	Offside	Almana General Hospital, Al Yamama, Zamil Industrial, Tamimi Group^{1}, Aljomaih Holding Company^{1}, Al Hokair Group^{2}, Al Wefaq^{2}
Al-Raed	(Kosovo) Besnik Hasi	(Saudi Arabia) Yahya Al-Musalem	Erreà	Naqi Water^{1}
Al-Shabab	(Romania) Marius Șumudică	(Saudi Arabia) Nasser Al-Shamrani	Xtep	Moya, Al Saif Gallery^{1}, Boudl Hotels^{1}, Al Wefaq^{2}, Physio Trio^{3}
Al-Taawoun	(Portugal) Pedro Emanuel	(Syria) Jehad Al-Hussain	Mafro	Almosafer, Naqi Water^{1}, Shmagh Albassam^{1}, Al Wefaq^{2}
Al-Wehda	(Argentina) Juan Brown	(Saudi Arabia) Osama Hawsawi	Adidas	Abdul Samad Al Qurashi^{1}
Ohod	(Tunisia) Ammar Souayah	(Saudi Arabia) Abdoh Besisi	Erreà	Mozn, Saudi German Hospital^{1}, Al Tazaj^{3}

- ^{1} On the back of the strip.
- ^{2} On the right sleeve of the strip.
- ^{3} On the shorts.

=== Managerial changes ===
Team	Outgoing manager	Manner of departure	Date of vacancy	Position in table	Incoming manager	Date of appointment
Al-Ettifaq	(Saudi Arabia) Saad Al-Shehri	Signed by Saudi Arabia U23	13 April 2018	Pre-season	(Uruguay) Leonardo Ramos	23 May 2018
Al-Nassr	(Croatia) Krunoslav Jurčić	End of contract	13 April 2018	Pre-season	(Uruguay) José Daniel Carreño	14 April 2018
Al-Hilal	(Argentina) Juan Brown	Interim period ended	13 April 2018	Pre-season	(Portugal) Jorge Jesus	5 June 2018
Al-Qadsiah	(Saudi Arabia) Bandar Basreh	Interim period ended	13 April 2018	Pre-season	(Serbia) Aleksandar Stanojević	23 May 2018
Al-Shabab	(Saudi Arabia) Khalid Al-Koroni	Interim period ended	13 April 2018	Pre-season	(Romania) Marius Șumudică	14 June 2018
Al-Taawoun	(Portugal) José Manuel Gomes	Resigned	2 May 2018	Pre-season	(Portugal) Pedro Emanuel	7 May 2018
Al-Faisaly	(Serbia) Vuk Rašović	Signed by Al Dhafra	3 May 2018	Pre-season	(Romania) Mircea Rednic	2 July 2018
Ohod	(Senegal) Sadio Demba	End of contract	4 May 2018	Pre-season	(Paraguay) Francisco Arce	9 June 2018
Al-Hazem	(Saudi Arabia) Abdulwahab Al-Harbi	End of contract	5 May 2018	Pre-season	(Romania) Daniel Isăilă	8 June 2018
Al-Wehda	(Algeria) Djamel Belkacem	End of contract	5 May 2018	Pre-season	(Brazil) Fábio Carille	22 May 2018
Al-Ahli	(Tunisia) Fathi Al-Jabal	End of caretaker spell	15 May 2018	Pre-season	(Argentina) Pablo Guede	15 May 2018
Al-Ittihad	(Chile) José Luis Sierra	End of contract	21 May 2018	Pre-season	(Argentina) Ramón Díaz	22 May 2018
Al-Batin	(Romania) Ciprian Panait	End of contract	31 May 2018	Pre-season	(Belgium) Franky Vercauteren	26 July 2018
Al-Raed	(Serbia) Aleksandar Ilić	End of contract	31 May 2018	Pre-season	(Kosovo) Besnik Hasi	26 July 2018
Al-Ittihad	(Argentina) Ramón Díaz	Sacked	15 September 2018	16th	(Croatia) Slaven Bilić	27 September 2018
Al-Faisaly	(Romania) Mircea Rednic	Sacked	8 October 2018	11th	(Brazil) Péricles Chamusca	14 October 2018
Al-Fayha	(Argentina) Gustavo Costas	Sacked	15 October 2018	14th	(Serbia) Slavoljub Muslin	15 October 2018
Al-Batin	(Belgium) Franky Vercauteren	Sacked	1 November 2018	14th	(Saudi Arabia) Yousef Al-Ghadeer	10 November 2018
Al-Qadsiah	(Serbia) Aleksandar Stanojević	Sacked	4 November 2018	15th	(Bulgaria) Ivaylo Petev	11 November 2018
Al-Nassr	(Uruguay) José Daniel Carreño	Sacked	10 November 2018	2nd	(Portugal) Rui Vitória	10 January 2019
Ohod	(Paraguay) Francisco Arce	Sacked	23 November 2018	15th	(Portugal) Paulo Alves	27 November 2018
Al-Ettifaq	(Uruguay) Leonardo Ramos	Sacked	27 November 2018	7th	(Spain) Sergio Piernas	1 December 2018
Al-Wehda	(Brazil) Fábio Carille	Signed by Corinthians	13 December 2018	5th	(Egypt) Mido	5 January 2019
Ohod	(Portugal) Paulo Alves	Sacked	14 January 2019	16th	(Tunisia) Ammar Souayah	19 January 2019
Al-Hilal	(Portugal) Jorge Jesus	Sacked	30 January 2019	1st	(Croatia) Zoran Mamić	30 January 2019
Al-Fayha	(Serbia) Slavoljub Muslin	Sacked	2 February 2019	14th	(Algeria) Noureddine Zekri	5 February 2019
Al-Ahli	(Argentina) Pablo Guede	Sacked	5 February 2019	4th	(Uruguay) Jorge Fossati	8 February 2019
Al-Batin	(Saudi Arabia) Yousef Al-Ghadeer	Mutual consent	17 February 2019	13th	(Romania) Ciprian Panait	17 February 2019
Al-Ittihad	(Croatia) Slaven Bilić	Sacked	24 February 2019	15th	(Chile) José Luis Sierra	24 February 2019
Al-Qadsiah	(Bulgaria) Ivaylo Petev	Sacked	10 March 2019	11th	(Saudi Arabia) Bandar Basreh	10 March 2019
Al-Wehda	(Egypt) Mido	Sacked	19 March 2019	6th	(Argentina) Juan Brown	20 March 2019
Al-Ahli	(Uruguay) Jorge Fossati	Sacked	17 April 2019	5th	(Saudi Arabia) Yousef Anbar (caretaker)	17 April 2019
Al-Ettifaq	(Spain) Sergio Piernas	Sacked	19 April 2019	10th	(Portugal) Hélder (caretaker)	19 April 2019
Al-Qadsiah	(Saudi Arabia) Bandar Basreh	Mutual consent	22 April 2019	14th	(Tunisia) Nacif Beyaoui	22 April 2019
Al-Faisaly	(Brazil) Péricles Chamusca	Loaned to Al-Hilal	27 April 2019	6th	(Saudi Arabia) Al-Homaidy Al-Otaibi (caretaker)	27 April 2019
Al-Hilal	(Croatia) Zoran Mamić	Sacked	27 April 2019	2nd	(Brazil) Péricles Chamusca (caretaker)	27 April 2019

=== Foreign players ===
The number of foreign players is limited to 7 per team. On June 7, 2018, the Saudi FF increased the number of foreign players from 7 to 8 players.

- Players name in **bold** indicates the player was registered during the mid-season transfer window.
- Players name in italic indicates the player was de-registered or left their respective clubs during the mid-season transfer window.

Club	Player 1	Player 2	Player 3	Player 4	Player 5	Player 6	Player 7	Player 8	Former players
Al-Ahli	(Brazil) **Aderllan**	(Cape Verde) Djaniny	(Chile) **Claudio Baeza**	(Chile) Paulo Díaz	(Egypt) Mohamed Abdel Shafy	(Romania) **Nicolae Stanciu**	(Ba'athist Syria) Omar Al Somah		(Brazil) Souza (Egypt) Abdallah El Said (Spain) Alexis (Spain) José Manuel Jurado
Al-Batin	(Australia) **Osama Malik**	(Brazil) Adriano Facchini	(Brazil) Baraka	(Brazil) Cryzan	(Brazil) **Jhonnattann**	(Brazil) Lucas Tagliapietra	(Guinea) **Ismaël Bangoura**	(Tunisia) **Zied Ounalli**	(Brazil) João Gabriel (Colombia) Johan Arango (Colombia) Misael Riascos (Morocco) Aziz Bouhaddouz
Al-Ettifaq	(Algeria) Raïs M'Bolhi	(Argentina) Cristian Guanca	(Egypt) Hussein El Sayed	(Slovakia) Filip Kiss	(Tunisia) **Ahmed Akaïchi**	(Tunisia) Fakhreddine Ben Youssef	(Uruguay) Brahian Alemán	(Uruguay) Ramón Arias	(Brazil) Farley Rosa
Al-Faisaly	(Brazil) **Denílson**	(Brazil) Igor Rossi	(Brazil) Luisinho	(Brazil) Rogerinho	(Colombia) Diego Calderón	(Croatia) Ante Puljić	(Kuwait) Fahad Al Ansari	(Trinidad and Tobago) Khaleem Hyland	(Nigeria) Joseph Akpala
Al-Fateh	(Algeria) Ibrahim Chenihi	(Algeria) Mohamed Naâmani	(Belarus) **Nikita Korzun**	(Brazil) João Pedro	(Serbia) **Saša Jovanović**	(Tunisia) Abdelkader Oueslati	(Ukraine) Maksym Koval	(Uruguay) Matías Aguirregaray	(Democratic Republic of the Congo) Nzuzi Toko (Guinea) Alkhaly Bangoura
Al-Fayha	(Brazil) **Iury**	(Cape Verde) Gegé	(Colombia) Danilo Asprilla	(Greece) Alexandros Tziolis	(Jordan) **Amer Shafi**	(Sweden) **Nahir Besara**	(Tunisia) **Amine Chermiti**	(Tunisia) **Rami Bedoui**	(Argentina) Jonathan Gómez (Brazil) Naldo (Chile) Ronnie Fernández (Colombia) Cristian Bonilla (Costa Rica) John Jairo Ruiz (Ghana) Seidu Yahaya
Al-Hazem	(Algeria) Malik Asselah	(Brazil) Alemão	(Brazil) Muralha	(Brazil) Rodolfo	(Colombia) Jhon Pajoy	(Georgia (country)) **Zurab Tsiskaridze**	(Nigeria) **Kennedy Igboananike**	(Portugal) **Diogo Salomão**	(Bolivia) Gilbert Álvarez (Ecuador) Carlos Feraud (Ba'athist Syria) Youssef Kalfa
Al-Hilal	(Australia) **Miloš Degenek**	(Brazil) Carlos Eduardo	(France) Bafétimbi Gomis	(Italy) **Sebastian Giovinco**	(Oman) Ali Al-Habsi	(Peru) André Carrillo	(Spain) Alberto Botía	(Spain) **Jonathan Soriano**	(Morocco) Achraf Bencharki (Ba'athist Syria) Omar Khribin (United Arab Emirates) Omar Abdulrahman (Venezuela) Gelmin Rivas
Al-Ittihad	(Brazil) Jonas	(Brazil) Romarinho	(Cape Verde) **Garry Rodrigues**	(Chile) Carlos Villanueva	(Ivory Coast) **Sékou Sanogo**	(Morocco) Karim El Ahmadi	(Morocco) **Manuel da Costa**	(Serbia) **Aleksandar Prijović**	(Australia) Matthew Jurman (Brazil) **Marcelo Grohe** (Brazil) Thiago Carleto (Brazil) Valdívia (Serbia) Aleksandar Pešić
Al-Nassr	(Australia) Brad Jones	(Brazil) Bruno Uvini	(Brazil) Giuliano	(Brazil) **Maicon**	(Brazil) Petros	(Morocco) Abderrazak Hamdallah	(Morocco) Nordin Amrabat	(Nigeria) Ahmed Musa	(Peru) Christian Ramos
Al-Qadsiah	(Algeria) **Mokhtar Belkhiter**	(Australia) Jack Duncan	(Australia) Rhys Williams	(Brazil) Bismark	(Brazil) Élton Arábia	(Brazil) **Jou Silva**	(Ghana) **Mohammed Fatau**	(Ba'athist Syria) **Youssef Kalfa**	(Brazil) Jorginho (Brazil) Yago (Cameroon) Aboubakar Oumarou (Ivory Coast) Hervé Guy
Al-Raed	(Algeria) Azzedine Doukha	(Algeria) Hicham Belkaroui	(Belgium) **Ilombe Mboyo**	(Brazil) Daniel Amora	(Brazil) **Kanu**	(Egypt) Mohamed Atwa	(Morocco) Ahmed Hammoudan	(North Macedonia) Ferhan Hasani	(Belgium) Yassine El Ghanassy (Guinea) Ismaël Bangoura
Al-Shabab	(Algeria) Djamel Benlamri	(Brazil) Luiz Antônio	(Brazil) **Sebá**	(The Gambia) **Bubacarr Trawally**	(Morocco) **Mbark Boussoufa**	(Romania) Constantin Budescu	(Romania) Valerică Găman	(Tunisia) Farouk Ben Mustapha	(Brazil) Arthur Caíke (Brazil) Euller (Brazil) Somália
Al-Taawoun	(Brazil) Cássio	(Brazil) **Nildo Petrolina**	(Brazil) Sandro Manoel	(Burundi) Cédric Amissi	(Cameroon) Léandre Tawamba	(Cape Verde) Héldon Ramos	(Portugal) Ricardo Machado	(Ba'athist Syria) Jehad Al-Hussain	(Brazil) Jhonnattann
Al-Wehda	(Algeria) **Zidane Mebarakou**	(Brazil) Anselmo	(Brazil) Marcos Guilherme	(Brazil) Renato Chaves	(Democratic Republic of the Congo) **Kabongo Kasongo**	(Egypt) Mohamed Awad	(Tunisia) **Issam Jebali**	(Venezuela) Rómulo Otero	(Brazil) Fernandão (Turkey) Emre Çolak
Ohod	(Algeria) **Carl Medjani**	(Cameroon) Adolphe Teikeu	(Morocco) **Mohamed Fouzair**	(Niger) **Moussa Maâzou**	(Ba'athist Syria) Tamer Haj Mohamad	(Tunisia) **Aymen Belaïd**	(Tunisia) Ghazi Abderrazzak	(Uzbekistan) Ignatiy Nesterov	(Bosnia and Herzegovina) Enes Sipović (Brazil) Apodi (Brazil) Bruno Michel (Brazil) Ribamar (Egypt) Ahmed Gomaa (Egypt) **Moamen Zakaria** (Ghana) Carlos Ohene (Morocco) Zouhair Laaroubi

== League table ==
Pos	Team	Pld	W	D	L	GF	GA	GD	Pts	Qualification or relegation
1	Al-Nassr (C)	30	22	4	4	69	27	+42	70	Qualification for AFC Champions League group stage (Note: Al-Taawoun qualified for the AFC Champions League group stage as 2019 King Cup winners.)
2	Al-Hilal	30	21	6	3	66	33	+33	69	Qualification for AFC Champions League group stage
3	Al-Taawoun	30	16	8	6	61	31	+30	56	Qualification for AFC Champions League group stage
4	Al-Ahli	30	17	4	9	68	41	+27	55	Qualification for AFC Champions League play-off round
5	Al-Shabab	30	15	9	6	39	25	+14	54	Qualification for Arab Club Champions Cup
6	Al-Faisaly	30	12	7	11	51	47	+4	43	
7	Al-Wehda	30	12	6	12	41	41	0	42	
8	Al-Raed	30	10	8	12	38	48	−10	38	
9	Al-Fateh	30	8	11	11	32	45	−13	35	
10	Al-Ittihad	30	9	7	14	44	45	−1	34	Qualification for Arab Club Champions Cup
11	Al-Ettifaq	30	8	9	13	40	55	−15	33	
12	Al-Fayha	30	9	5	16	36	52	−16	32	
13	Al-Hazem (O)	30	7	10	13	33	50	−17	31	Qualification for Relegation play-offs
14	Al-Qadsiah (R)	30	8	4	18	34	51	−17	28	Relegation to Prince Mohammad bin Salman League
15	Al-Batin (R)	30	7	4	19	29	53	−24	25	Relegation to Prince Mohammad bin Salman League
16	Ohod (R)	30	5	6	19	25	62	−37	21	Relegation to Prince Mohammad bin Salman League

Source: spl.com
Rules for classification: 1) Points; 2) Head-to-head points; 3) Head-to-head goal difference; 4) Total goal difference; 5) Total goals scored; 6) Play-off (only for deciding champion, relegation and AFC competitions participation).
(C) Champions; (O) Play-off winners; (R) Relegated

== Positions by round ==
The following table lists the positions of teams after each week of matches. In order to preserve the chronological evolution, any postponed matches are not included to the round at which they were originally scheduled but added to the full round they were played immediately afterward. If a club from the Saudi Professional League wins the King Cup, they will qualify for the AFC Champions League, unless they have already qualified for it through their league position. In this case, an additional AFC Champions League group stage berth will be given to the 3rd placed team, and the AFC Champions League play-off round spot will be given to 4th.

Team ╲ Round	1	2	3	4	5	6	7	8	9	10	11	12	13	14	15	16	17	18	19	20	21	22	23	24	25	26	27	28	29	30
Al-Nassr	1	3	2	2	1	1	1	3	2	2	2	2	2	2	2	2	2	2	2	2	2	2	2	2	1	1	2	1	1	1
Al-Hilal	2	1	1	1	3	2	2	1	1	1	1	1	1	1	1	1	1	1	1	1	1	1	1	1	2	2	1	2	2	2
Al-Taawoun	8	7	7	7	7	6	6	7	7	6	5	4	3	4	4	6	6	5	6	5	4	4	4	4	4	4	4	4	4	3
Al-Ahli	7	5	4	3	2	3	3	2	3	3	3	3	4	5	5	4	4	4	3	4	5	5	5	5	5	5	5	5	5	4
Al-Shabab	3	2	4	5	5	8	7	5	4	5	6	6	5	3	3	3	3	3	4	3	3	3	3	3	3	3	3	3	3	5
Al-Faisaly	4	12	8	9	11	12	10	8	8	9	8	8	9	7	7	7	8	8	9	8	8	8	8	7	6	7	6	6	6	6
Al-Wehda	13	10	6	6	4	4	4	4	5	4	4	5	6	6	6	5	5	6	5	6	6	6	6	6	7	6	7	7	7	7
Al-Raed	9	13	13	13	9	10	11	10	12	13	12	11	12	12	9	9	10	10	11	10	10	10	10	10	10	10	10	9	9	8
Al-Fateh	10	9	10	11	8	7	8	9	9	8	9	7	8	10	11	11	9	11	8	7	7	7	7	8	8	8	8	8	8	9
Al-Ittihad	15	16	15	16	16	16	16	16	16	16	16	16	15	15	15	15	15	15	15	15	15	15	14	13	13	13	12	11	10	10
Al-Ettifaq	6	6	3	4	6	5	5	6	6	7	7	9	7	9	8	8	7	7	7	9	9	9	9	9	9	9	9	10	11	11
Al-Fayha	16	14	16	12	14	14	13	12	10	10	10	12	13	11	12	13	14	14	14	14	14	13	15	15	14	14	13	13	13	12
Al-Hazem	12	8	11	8	10	9	9	11	11	12	13	13	11	13	13	12	13	12	12	12	12	12	12	12	11	12	11	12	12	13
Al-Qadsiah	11	4	9	10	12	11	12	15	14	11	11	10	10	8	10	10	11	9	10	11	11	11	11	11	12	11	14	14	14	14
Al-Batin	5	11	12	14	13	13	14	13	13	14	14	14	14	14	14	14	12	13	13	13	13	14	13	14	15	15	15	15	15	15
Ohod	14	15	14	15	15	15	15	14	15	15	15	15	16	16	16	16	16	16	16	16	16	16	16	16	16	16	16	16	16	16

Leader
2020 AFC Champions League group stage
2020 AFC Champions League play-off round
Qualification to relegation play-off
Relegation to 2019–20 First Division

Updated to match(es) played on 16 May 2019. Source: spl.com.sa

== Results ==
Home \ Away	AHL	BAT	ETT	FSY	FAT	FAY	HAZ	HIL	ITT	NSR	QAD	RAE	SHB	TWN	WHD	OHD
Al-Ahli		2–0	5–0	2–0	5–1	1–1	2–0	0–1	1–1	1–2	0–2	4–5	0–1	1–1	3–2	5–1
Al-Batin	1–2		0–0	2–0	2–2	1–0	1–0	2–3	1–3	0–2	2–0	1–3	1–2	0–5	1–1	0–1
Al-Ettifaq	6–2	3–2		3–4	0–0	3–0	1–0	0–1	1–0	1–2	3–2	1–1	1–1	2–4	2–1	0–0
Al-Faisaly	1–4	2–2	5–1		1–1	1–0	1–2	1–1	3–2	2–2	3–0	2–0	0–0	1–4	3–0	2–0
Al-Fateh	2–1	0–2	0–0	1–1		1–2	3–2	2–3	2–0	0–0	2–0	0–4	1–0	0–2	0–0	4–0
Al-Fayha	0–2	2–1	1–1	3–4	1–2		1–1	1–5	2–1	1–1	4–2	0–3	1–3	2–1	5–2	3–0
Al-Hazem	2–4	1–0	1–1	2–1	1–0	0–1		2–3	0–3	0–3	2–1	1–0	1–3	1–1	0–0	2–2
Al-Hilal	4–3	3–1	4–1	2–1	4–1	1–0	1–2		3–1	2–2	4–1	1–1	3–2	0–2	1–1	0–0
Al-Ittihad	1–3	4–1	2–0	1–2	6–2	2–0	2–2	0–2		1–2	0–3	1–2	0–0	0–0	2–2	1–1
Al-Nassr	0–2	2–1	3–2	2–1	5–0	1–0	5–1	3–2	2–3		3–1	4–0	1–0	1–0	1–2	4–0
Al–Qadsiah	1–2	0–2	2–0	1–1	0–0	2–0	2–2	0–2	0–1	0–3		3–1	0–1	3–1	0–1	4–2
Al-Raed	0–0	1–0	1–2	0–3	0–3	0–0	1–0	1–3	1–1	0–5	0–0		1–1	2–1	1–3	5–1
Al-Shabab	0–4	4–0	2–2	2–1	1–1	4–1	2–0	0–1	1–0	0–1	2–1	1–1		0–0	1–0	1–0
Al-Taawoun	3–4	4–1	4–1	2–1	1–1	3–0	1–1	2–2	5–3	3–1	2–0	2–1	1–1		1–0	4–0
Al-Wehda	2–1	1–0	3–1	1–2	1–0	2–1	1–1	0–3	0–2	0–4	4–0	4–1	0–1	0–1		4–1
Ohod	0–2	0–1	2–1	4–1	0–0	1–3	3–3	0–1	1–0	1–2	1–3	0–1	1–2	1–0	1–3	

Updated to match(es) played on 16 May 2019. Source: slstat.com
Legend: Blue = home team win; Yellow = draw; Red = away team win.

=== Season progress ===
Team ╲ Round	1	2	3	4	5	6	7	8	9	10	11	12	13	14	15	16	17	18	19	20	21	22	23	24	25	26	27	28	29	30
Al-Ahli	D	W	W	W	W	L	W	W	L	W	D	D	L	L	L	W	W	W	W	L	L	D	W	W	L	W	L	W	W	W
Al-Batin	D	L	L	L	W	L	L	W	D	L	L	W	L	L	W	D	W	L	L	L	L	D	W	L	L	L	L	W	L	L
Al-Ettifaq	D	W	W	D	L	W	W	L	L	L	D	L	W	D	W	D	W	L	D	L	D	L	L	D	W	L	D	L	L	L
Al-Faisaly	D	L	W	L	L	L	W	W	D	D	D	W	D	W	W	D	L	L	L	W	W	L	L	W	W	D	W	W	L	L
Al-Fateh	D	D	D	L	W	W	L	L	D	W	L	W	D	D	D	L	W	L	W	W	W	D	L	D	L	D	D	L	L	L
Al-Fayha	L	L	L	W	L	L	D	W	W	D	D	L	L	W	L	L	L	L	D	L	L	W	L	L	W	W	W	L	D	W
Al-Hazem	D	D	L	W	L	W	L	L	D	D	D	L	W	L	L	D	D	W	L	W	D	L	D	L	W	L	W	L	L	D
Al-Hilal	W	W	W	W	W	W	W	W	W	D	W	D	L	W	D	D	W	W	W	W	W	W	D	D	L	W	W	L	W	W
Al-Ittihad	L	L	L	D	L	D	L	L	L	L	D	L	W	L	L	W	D	W	D	D	L	D	W	W	L	W	W	W	W	L
Al-Nassr	W	W	W	W	W	W	D	L	W	W	L	D	W	W	D	D	W	L	W	W	W	W	W	W	W	W	L	W	W	W
Al-Qadsiah	D	W	L	L	L	L	L	L	W	W	D	W	W	W	L	L	L	W	L	L	L	D	L	L	L	W	L	L	L	D
Al-Raed	D	L	L	D	W	L	L	W	W	L	W	D	L	W	W	D	L	D	L	D	L	D	L	W	W	L	L	W	D	W
Al-Shabab	W	W	D	D	D	L	W	W	D	L	D	W	W	W	W	W	D	D	L	W	W	L	W	D	W	L	W	W	D	L
Al-Taawoun	D	D	W	L	D	W	W	L	L	W	W	W	W	L	D	D	L	W	D	W	W	W	W	D	W	L	W	W	D	W
Al-Wehda	D	D	W	D	W	W	W	L	L	W	W	L	L	L	W	W	D	L	W	L	W	D	D	L	L	W	L	L	W	L
Ohod	L	L	L	D	L	D	L	W	D	L	L	L	L	L	L	L	L	W	W	L	L	D	D	D	L	L	L	L	W	W

Updated to match(es) played on 16 May 2019. Source: slstat.com
W = Win; D = Draw; L = Lose

== Relegation play-offs ==
The 13th place team in the Saudi Professional League, Al-Hazem, will face the 4th place team in the MS League, Al-Khaleej, over two legs on a home-and-away basis.

All times are AST (UTC+3).

=== First leg ===
20 May 2019
22:30

Al-Hazem	1–0	Al-Khaleej
Pajoy 20' (pen.); Al-Hamdan (yellow card) 50'	Report	Al-Nashi (yellow card) 14'; Diaby (yellow card) 18'; Al-Qeed (yellow card) 84'; Bangoura (yellow card) 90+3'

Al-Hazem Club Stadium, Ar Rass
Referee: Ovidiu Hațegan (Romania)

=== Second leg ===
24 May 2019
22:30

Al-Khaleej	2–1 (a.e.t.)	Al-Hazem
Al-Sheikh (yellow card) 33'; Al-Khateeb (yellow card) 49'; Bernardo (yellow card) 53'; Diaby 64', 120+1', (yellow card) 120+1'	Report	Al-Rio (yellow card) 59'; Bakheet (yellow card) 88'; Al-Saiari 93' (pen.), (yellow card) 105+1'
Penalties
Al-Motawaa (penalty missed); Al-Enezi (penalty scored); Al-Khateeb (penalty scored); Al-Sheikh (penalty missed); Lajami (penalty missed)	2–3	Alemão (penalty scored); Al-Saiari (penalty scored); Bakheet (penalty missed); Rodolfo (penalty scored)

Al-Khaleej Club Stadium, Saihat
Referee: Szymon Marciniak (Poland)

== Season statistics ==
=== Scoring ===
==== Top scorers ====
As of 16 May 2019

Rank	Player	Club	Goals
1	(Morocco) Abderrazak Hamdallah	Al-Nassr	34
2	(Cameroon) Léandre Tawamba	Al-Taawoun	21
2	(France) Bafétimbi Gomis	Al-Hilal	21
4	(Cape Verde) Djaniny	Al-Ahli	20
5	(Ba'athist Syria) Omar Al Somah	Al-Ahli	19
6	(Saudi Arabia) Saleh Al-Shehri	Al-Raed	16
7	(Colombia) Danilo Asprilla	Al-Fayha	15
8	(Argentina) Cristian Guanca	Al-Ettifaq	14
9	(Saudi Arabia) Abdulfattah Adam	Al-Taawoun	12
10	(Saudi Arabia) Fahad Al-Muwallad	Al-Ittihad	11

==== Hat-tricks ====
Player	For	Against	Result	Date	Ref.
(Nigeria) Ahmed Musa	Al-Nassr	Al-Qadsiah	3–0 (A)	19 September 2018	
(Argentina) Cristian Guanca	Al-Ettifaq	Al-Fayha	3–0 (H)	21 September 2018	
(Saudi Arabia) Mohammed Al-Saiari	Al-Hazem	Ohod	3–3 (A)	8 November 2018	
(Morocco) Abderrazak Hamdallah^{4}	Al-Nassr	Al-Raed	4–0 (H)	14 December 2018	
(Cameroon) Léandre Tawamba	Al-Taawoun	Al-Fayha	3–0 (H)	14 December 2018	
(Ba'athist Syria) Omar Al Somah	Al-Ahli	Al-Hilal	3–4 (A)	21 December 2018	
(Cape Verde) Djaniny^{5}	Al-Ahli	Ohod	5–1 (H)	11 January 2019	
(Saudi Arabia) Abdulfattah Adam	Al-Taawoun	Ohod	4–0 (H)	14 February 2019	
(Cameroon) Léandre Tawamba	Al-Taawoun	Al-Ettifaq	4–1 (H)	28 February 2019	
(Morocco) Abderrazak Hamdallah^{4}	Al-Nassr	Al-Wehda	4–0 (A)	16 March 2019	
(Saudi Arabia) Saleh Al-Shehri^{4}	Al-Raed	Al-Ahli	5–4 (A)	28 March 2019	
(Morocco) Abderrazak Hamdallah	Al-Nassr	Al-Raed	5–0 (A)	4 April 2019	
(Saudi Arabia) Saleh Al-Shehri	Al-Raed	Ohod	5–1 (H)	19 April 2019	
(Morocco) Abderrazak Hamdallah	Al-Nassr	Al-Hazem	3–0 (A)	11 May 2019	
(Serbia) Aleksandar Prijović	Al-Ittihad	Al-Fateh	6–2 (H)	11 May 2019	
(Cape Verde) Djaniny	Al-Ahli	Al-Ettifaq	5–0 (H)	16 May 2019	

Note

(H) – Home; (A) – Away
^{4} Player scored 4 goals; ^{5} Player scored 5 goals

=== Clean sheets ===
As of 16 May 2019

Rank	Player	Club	Clean sheets
1	(Australia) Brad Jones	Al-Nassr	11
1	(Ukraine) Maksym Koval	Al-Fateh	11
3	(Brazil) Cássio	Al-Taawoun	10
3	(Tunisia) Farouk Ben Mustapha	Al-Shabab	10
5	(Saudi Arabia) Mohammed Al-Owais	Al-Ahli	9
6	(Algeria) Azzedine Doukha	Al-Raed	8
7	(Brazil) Adriano Facchini	Al-Batin	7
7	(Saudi Arabia) Fawaz Al-Qarni	Al-Ittihad	7
7	(Saudi Arabia) Mustafa Malayekah	Al-Faisaly	7
10	(Algeria) Raïs M'Bolhi	Al-Ettifaq	6
10	(Australia) Jack Duncan	Al-Qadsiah	6
10	(Egypt) Mohamed Awad	Al-Wehda	6
10	(Oman) Ali Al-Habsi	Al-Hilal	6

=== Discipline ===
==== Player ====
- Most yellow cards: 11
  - (Saudi Arabia) Saeed Al-Rubaie (Al-Ettifaq)
- Most red cards: 2
  - (Chile) Paulo Díaz (Al-Ahli)
  - (Saudi Arabia) Hassan Muath (Al-Shabab)
  - (Saudi Arabia) Masoud Bakheet (Al-Hazem)
  - (Uruguay) Brahian Alemán (Al-Ettifaq)

==== Club ====
- Most yellow cards: 82
  - Al-Ettifaq
- Most red cards: 7
  - Al-Hilal

== Attendances ==
=== By team ===
Pos	Team	Total	High	Low	Average	Change
1	Al-Ittihad	502,230	52,210	15,905	33,482	+106.5%
2	Al-Hilal	293,271	23,047	10,112	19,551	+60.3%
3	Al-Ahli	282,246	42,880	14,629	18,816	+13.0%
4	Al-Nassr	246,115	59,174	3,039	16,408	+199.4%
5	Ohod	106,118	20,207	1,680	7,075	+15.9%
6	Al-Wehda	103,668	32,567	437	6,911	n/a †
7	Al-Ettifaq	73,660	12,817	1,273	4,911	+58.9%
8	Al-Taawoun	66,657	14,893	1,473	4,444	+14.7%
9	Al-Raed	56,196	11,735	1,360	3,746	−21.5%
10	Al-Batin	52,142	6,000	1,436	3,476	+29.3%
11	Al-Shabab	51,413	14,530	594	3,428	+60.5%
12	Al-Fateh	51,411	9,050	250	3,427	+15.1%
13	Al Qadsiah	43,237	10,420	420	2,883	+39.1%
14	Al-Hazem	30,768	6,200	802	2,051	n/a †
15	Al-Fayha	28,437	4,307	732	1,896	+102.1%
16	Al-Faisaly	17,568	3,498	503	1,171	+20.5%
	League total	2,005,137	59,174	250	8,355	+45.9%

Updated to games played on 17 May 2019
Notes:
^{†} Teams played previous season in First Division.

== Awards ==
=== Monthly awards ===
Month	Manager of the Month		Player of the Month		Reference
Month	Manager	Club	Player	Club	Reference
September	(Portugal) Jorge Jesus	Al-Hilal	(Algeria) Raïs M'Bolhi	Al-Ettifaq	
October	(Brazil) Fábio Carille	Al-Wehda	(Venezuela) Rómulo Otero	Al-Wehda	
November	(Serbia) Slavoljub Muslin	Al-Fayha	(Cameroon) Léandre Tawamba	Al-Taawoun	
December	(Romania) Marius Șumudică	Al-Shabab	(Morocco) Abderrazak Hamdallah	Al-Nassr	
January	(Croatia) Slaven Bilić	Al-Ittihad	(Cape Verde) Djaniny	Al-Ahli	
February	(Tunisia) Fathi Al-Jabal	Al-Fateh	(France) Bafétimbi Gomis	Al-Hilal	
March	(Portugal) Rui Vitória	Al-Nassr	(Morocco) Abderrazak Hamdallah	Al-Nassr	
April	(Chile) José Luis Sierra	Al-Ittihad	(Morocco) Abderrazak Hamdallah	Al-Nassr	

=== Round awards ===
Month	Manager of the Round		Player of the Round		Fans of the Round	Reference
Month	Manager	Club	Player	Club	Club	Reference
Round 2	(Serbia) Aleksandar Stanojević	Al-Qadsiah	(Brazil) Élton Arábia	Al-Qadsiah	Al-Ittihad	
Round 3	(Uruguay) José Daniel Carreño	Al-Nassr	(Nigeria) Ahmed Musa	Al-Nassr	Al-Ahli	
Round 4	(Romania) Daniel Isăilă	Al-Hazem	(Saudi Arabia) Abdullah Al-Salem	Al-Fayha	Al-Ittihad	
Round 5	(Uruguay) José Daniel Carreño	Al-Nassr	(Morocco) Nordin Amrabat	Al-Nassr	Al-Nassr	
Round 6	(Uruguay) Leonardo Ramos	Al-Ettifaq	(Uruguay) Brahian Alemán	Al-Ettifaq	Al-Wehda	
Round 7	(Serbia) Slavoljub Muslin	Al-Fayha	(Cape Verde) Djaniny	Al-Ahli	Al-Ittihad	
Round 8	(Argentina) Pablo Guede	Al-Ahli	(Cape Verde) Djaniny	Al-Ahli	Al-Hilal	
Round 9	(Saudi Arabia) Abdulaziz Al-Bishi	Al-Qadsiah	(Saudi Arabia) Haroune Camara	Al-Qadsiah	Al-Hilal	
Round 10	(Portugal) Pedro Emanuel	Al-Taawoun	(Cameroon) Léandre Tawamba	Al-Taawoun	Al-Ahli	
Round 11	(Brazil) Fábio Carille	Al-Wehda	(Eritrea) Ahmed Abdu Jaber	Al-Wehda	Al-Ittihad	
Round 12	(Portugal) Hélder	Al-Nassr	(Morocco) Nordin Amrabat	Al-Nassr	Al-Hilal	
Round 13	(Romania) Daniel Isăilă	Al-Hazem	(Morocco) Abderrazak Hamdallah	Al-Nassr	Al-Taawoun	
Round 14	(Bulgaria) Ivaylo Petev	Al-Qadsiah	(Syria) Omar Al Somah	Al-Ahli	Al-Ittihad	
Round 15	(Egypt) Mido	Al-Wehda	(Venezuela) Rómulo Otero	Al-Wehda	Al-Wehda	
Round 16	(Romania) Marius Șumudică	Al-Shabab	(Cape Verde) Djaniny	Al-Ahli	Al-Ittihad	
Round 17	(Saudi Arabia) Yousef Al-Ghadeer	Al-Batin	(Brazil) Carlos Eduardo	Al-Hilal	Al-Ittihad	
Round 18	(Portugal) Pedro Emanuel	Al-Taawoun	(France) Bafétimbi Gomis	Al-Hilal	Al-Hilal	
Round 19	(Tunisia) Ammar Souayah	Ohod	(France) Bafétimbi Gomis	Al-Hilal	Al-Ittihad	
Round 20	(Brazil) Péricles Chamusca	Al-Faisaly	(Morocco) Abderrazak Hamdallah	Al-Nassr	Al-Hilal	
Round 21	(Croatia) Zoran Mamić	Al-Hilal	(Saudi Arabia) Mohammed Al-Majhad	Al-Fateh	Al-Hilal	
Round 22	(Portugal) Pedro Emanuel	Al-Taawoun	(Cameroon) Léandre Tawamba	Al-Taawoun	Al-Ahli	
Round 23	(Egypt) Mido	Al-Wehda	(Morocco) Abderrazak Hamdallah	Al-Nassr	Al-Ittihad	
Round 24	(Portugal) Rui Vitória	Al-Nassr	(Morocco) Abderrazak Hamdallah	Al-Nassr	Al-Nassr	
Round 25	(Portugal) Rui Vitória	Al-Nassr	(Brazil) Bruno Uvini	Al-Nassr	Al-Shabab	
Round 26	(Uruguay) Jorge Fossati	Al-Ahli	(Colombia) Danilo Asprilla	Al-Fayha	Al-Ittihad	
Round 27	(Chile) José Luis Sierra	Al-Ittihad	(Saudi Arabia) Fahad Al-Muwallad	Al-Ittihad	Al-Nassr	
Round 28	(Portugal) Pedro Emanuel	Al-Taawoun	(Morocco) Abderrazak Hamdallah	Al-Nassr	Al-Ittihad	
Round 29	(Chile) José Luis Sierra	Al-Ittihad	(Morocco) Abderrazak Hamdallah	Al-Nassr	Al-Ittihad	

=== Annual awards ===
Award	Winner	Club
Manager of the Season	(Portugal) Pedro Emanuel	Al-Taawoun
Player of the Season	(Morocco) Abderrazak Hamdallah	Al-Nassr
Saudi Player of the Season	(Saudi Arabia) Mohamed Kanno	Al-Hilal
Young Player of the Season	(Saudi Arabia) Muteb Al-Mufarrij	Al-Taawoun
Golden Glove	(Tunisia) Farouk Ben Mustapha	Al-Shabab
Golden Boot	(Morocco) Abderrazak Hamdallah	Al-Nassr

=== Team of the Season ===
Team of the Season
Goalkeeper	(Tunisia) Farouk Ben Mustapha (Al-Shabab)			
Defenders	(Saudi Arabia) Sultan Al-Ghannam (Al-Nassr)	(Portugal) Manuel da Costa (Al-Ittihad)	(Algeria) Djamel Benlamri (Al-Shabab)	(Saudi Arabia) Yasser Al-Shahrani (Al-Hilal)
Midfielders	(Colombia) Danilo Asprilla (Al-Fayha)	(Brazil) Petros (Al-Nassr)	(Saudi Arabia) Mohamed Kanno (Al-Hilal)	(Saudi Arabia) Saleh Al-Shehri (Al-Raed)
Forwards	(Cameroon) Leandre Tawamba (Al-Taawoun)	(Morocco) Abderrazak Hamdallah (Al-Nassr)		

== See also ==
- 2018–19 Prince Mohammad bin Salman League
- 2018–19 Second Division
- 2019 King Cup
- 2018 Super Cup
