= Al-Harbi =

Alharbi or Al-Harbi (Arabic: الحربي) is an Arabic surname that refers to the Harb tribe, one of the Tribes of Arabia.

Notable people with the name include:

- Hamad Al Harbi (born 1980), Kuwaiti footballer
- Helal Al-Harbi (born 1990), Saudi Arabian footballer
- Ibrahim Mater (born 1975), Saudi Arabian footballer
- Mansoor Al-Harbi (born 1987), Saudi Arabian footballer
- Mazi Salih al Harbi (1981–2006), Saudi Arabian who died at Guantanamo Bay
- Mishal al Harbi (born 1980), Saudi Arabian held at Guantanamo Bay (released 2005)
- Mishal Sayed Al-Harbi (born 1975), Kuwaiti sprinter
- Mohsin Al-Harbi (born 1980), Omani footballer
- Osama Al Harbi (born 1984), Saudi Arabian footballer
- Saeed Al-Harbi (born 1981), Saudi Arabian footballer
- Waleed Al-Harbi (born 1986), Saudi Arabian footballer

== See also ==
- Alharbi El Jadeyaoui (born 1986), French-born Moroccan footballer
- Harbi (disambiguation)
