= Reda El-Weshi =

Egyptian footballer (born 1985)

Personal information
- Full name: Tareq Ihab Helmy
- Date of birth: 1 March 1985 (age 41)
- Place of birth: Al-Tawfeeq, Egypt
- Height: 1.86 m (6 ft 1 in)
- Position: Striker

Team information
- Current team: Barazeely El-merghany

Youth career
- Al-Sekka Al-Hadid

Senior career*
Years	Team	Apps	(Gls)
2004–2007	Al-Sekka Al-Hadid	?	(?)
2007–2008	El-Ahly	7	(0)
2008–2010	Al-Mokawloon Al-Arab	53	(16)
2011	El-Entag El-Harby	10	(1)
2011–2012	Telephonat Bani Sweif	6	(3)
2012–2013	El-Entag El-Harby	10	(5)
2013	Al-Quwa Al-Jawiya	13	(7)
2013–2014	Karbalaa FC	3	(1)
2014	Al-Talaba SC		
2014–2015	Al-Faisaly		
2015–2017	Damietta		
2017–2019	Jeddah		

International career
2005–2007	Egypt U21	6	(3)
- * Club domestic league appearances and goals as of 13 Feb

Tareq Ihab Helmy aka Reda El-Weshi (Arabic:رضا الويشى) (born 1 March 1985) is an Egyptian football striker, currently playing for Barazeely Merghany, he is a former player for Egyptian side El-Ahly, Al-Mokawloon Al-Arab and Telephonat Bani Sweif in feb 2013 signed a contract with Al-Quwa Al-Jawiya Iraq Premier league played 13 game scored 7 goals now Reda join with Karbala Iraq Premier league season 2013-2014 played 3 game scored 1 goals.
