= Fathi Al-Jabal =

Tunisian football manager (born 1963)

Personal information
- Full name: Fathi Al-Jabal
- Date of birth: February 25, 1963 (age 63)
- Place of birth: Tunisia

Team information
- Current team: Al-Okhdood (head coach)

Managerial career
- Years: Team
- 1999–2001: Sdoos (assistant)
- 2001–2002: Sdoos
- 2002: Al-Najma
- 2003: Al-Hazem
- 2003: Sdoos
- 2003–2004: Sdoos
- 2004: → Al-Hamadah (loan)
- 2005: Al-Nakheel
- 2005–2007: Najran
- 2007: Hajer
- 2008–2014: Al-Fateh
- 2014–2015: Ajman
- 2015: Najran
- 2016: Al-Shabab
- 2016: Al-Shahania
- 2016–2019: Al-Fateh
- 2018: → Al-Ahli Jeddah (loan)
- 2019–2020: CS Sfaxien
- 2021: Maghreb de Fès
- 2021: Kuwait SC
- 2021–2023: Al-Ahli Tripoli
- 2023–2025: Swehly SC
- 2026–: Al-Okhdood

Fathi Al-Jabal (born February 25, 1963) is a Tunisian football manager who is the current head coach of Saudi Pro League club Al-Okhdood. He was the manager of Al-Fateh in the Saudi Professional League from 2008 to 2014, leading the Al-Ahsa club to its first promotion to the Saudi Professional League in 2009. He subsequently clinching the title in 2013, along with the first ever Saudi Super Cup.

== Managerial statistics ==
As of 14 October 2019

Team	Nat	From	To	Record							
Team	Nat	From	To	G	W	D	L	GF	GA	GD	Win %
Sdoos	(Saudi Arabia)	1 July 2001	30 May 2002	30	13	7	10	60	45	+15	43.33
Al-Najma	(Saudi Arabia)	31 May 2002	18 November 2002	14	3	2	9	17	31	−14	21.43
Al-Hazem	(Saudi Arabia)	22 January 2003	1 April 2003	7	2	1	4	9	12	−3	28.57
Sdoos	(Saudi Arabia)	5 April 2003	30 May 2003	4	2	1	1	7	9	−2	50.00
Sdoos	(Saudi Arabia)	1 December 2003	26 December 2004	23	10	6	7	32	26	+6	43.48
Al-Hamadah	(Saudi Arabia)	18 April 2004	1 May 2004	2	1	1	0	2	1	+1	50.00
Al-Nakheel	(Saudi Arabia)	1 February 2005	30 March 2005	9	3	3	3	8	5	+3	33.33
Najran	(Saudi Arabia)	7 August 2005	12 March 2007	62	31	19	12	108	82	+26	50.00
Hajer	(Saudi Arabia)	15 March 2007	30 May 2007	8	5	2	1	13	8	+5	62.50
Al-Fateh	(Saudi Arabia)	24 January 2008	26 May 2014	225	98	53	74	319	304	+15	43.56
Ajman	(United Arab Emirates)	6 July 2014	10 January 2015	19	3	4	12	20	40	−20	15.79
Najran	(Saudi Arabia)	26 June 2015	17 December 2015	14	2	2	10	10	23	−13	14.29
Al-Shabab	(Saudi Arabia)	3 January 2016	21 May 2016	15	7	3	5	20	21	−1	46.67
Al-Shahania	(Qatar)	19 June 2016	5 October 2016	2	1	0	1	2	2	+0	50.00
Al-Fateh	(Saudi Arabia)	11 October 2016	14 October 2019	92	30	31	31	113	131	−18	32.61
Al-Ahli	(Saudi Arabia)	18 April 2018	14 May 2018	2	0	1	1	3	4	−1	0.00
CS Sfaxien	(Tunisia)	15 October 2019	28 August 2020	20	11	5	4	25	13	+12	55.00
Maghreb de Fès	(Morocco)	14 May 2021	22 July 2021	13	4	5	4	14	15	−1	30.77
Kuwait SC	(Kuwait)	22 July 2021	26 October 2021	4	3	0	1	7	4	+3	75.00
Al-Ahli Tripoli	(Libya)	27 December 2021		0	0	0	0	0	0	+0	—
Career totals				565	229	146	190	789	776	+13	40.53

== Honours ==
=== Manager ===
Al-Fateh SC

- Saudi Professional League: 2012–13
- Saudi Super Cup: 2013

=== Individual ===
- Saudi Professional League Manager of the Month: February 2019
