= Harbi =

Harbi may refer to:

== Persons ==
- Fatema Al Harbi (born 1991 or 1992), Bahraini author and peace activist
- Harbi al-Himyari, semi-legendary alchemist and teacher of Jabir ibn Hayyan
- Ahmed Harbi (born 1986), an Israeli-born Palestinian footballer
- Mahmoud Harbi (1921–1960), a Somali politician
- Mohamed Harbi (1933–2026), an Algerian historian and member of the National Liberation Front (FLN)
- Rashida Tlaib (born 1976), an American politician born Rashida Harbi

== See also ==
- Al-Harbi (surname)
- Harb (tribe)
