= Ahmed Al-Zaaq =

Saudi Arabian footballer

Personal information
- Full name: Ahmed Ali Al-Zaaq
- Date of birth: April 28, 1989 (age 37)
- Place of birth: Saudi Arabia
- Height: 1.70 m (5 ft 7 in)
- Position: Winger

Senior career*
Years	Team	Apps	(Gls)
2008–2012	Al-Raed	9	(1)
2010	→ Damac F.C. (loan)		
2011–2012	→ Al-Orobah F.C. (loan)		
2012–2013	Al-Shoalah	14	(0)
2013–2014	Al-Riyadh SC		
2014–2018	Al Hazm		
2019–2020	Al-Arabi		
2020–2021	Al-Asyah		
- * Club domestic league appearances and goals

Ahmed Al-Zaaq is a Saudi Arabian football player who plays as a winger.
