= Ali Kharmi =

Saudi Arabian footballer

Personal information
- Full name: Ali Hussain Kharmi
- Date of birth: August 31, 1990 (age 36)
- Place of birth: Saudi Arabia
- Position: Forward

Team information
- Current team: Baish
- Number: 99

Youth career
- Al Tuhami

Senior career*
Years	Team	Apps	(Gls)
2011–2012	Al Tuhami	16	(6)
2012–2015	Al-Ittihad	0	(0)
2013	→ Al-Tai (loan)	??	(2)
2014–2015	→ Al-Batin (loan)	24	(13)
2015–2017	Al-Raed	7	(0)
2017	→ Al-Fayha (loan)	11	(7)
2017–2019	Al-Hazem	45	(12)
2019–2020	Al-Ain	20	(1)
2020–2021	Al-Kawkab	27	(4)
2021–2022	Bisha	15	(0)
2022–	Baish		
- * Club domestic league appearances and goals as of 20 September 2020

Ali Kharmi (Arabic: علي خرمي; born 31 August 1990) is a Saudi football player who currently plays for Baish as a forward.

== Honours ==
Al-Fayha

- Saudi First Division: 2016–17

Al-Hazem

- MS League runners-up: 2017–18

Al-Ain

- MS League third place: 2019–20
