= Abdulrahman Al-Khaibari =

Saudi Arabian footballer

Personal information
- Full name: Abdulrahman Mohammed Al-Khaibari
- Date of birth: February 3, 1988 (age 38)
- Place of birth: Unaizah, Saudi Arabia
- Height: 1.73 m (5 ft 8 in)
- Position: Midfielder

Youth career
- Al-Najmah

Senior career*
Years	Team	Apps	(Gls)
2007–2014	Al-Najmah		
2014–2015	Al-Shoulla	13	(1)
2015–2017	Al-Shabab	22	(0)
2017	Al-Qadsiah	1	(0)
2018–2021	Al-Kawkab		
2021–2023	Al-Orobah	60	(1)
2023–2024	Al-Najma	29	(0)
2024–2026	Al-Hazem	32	(1)
- * Club domestic league appearances and goals

Abdulrahman Al-Khaibari (Arabic: عبد الرحمن الخيبري, born 3 February 1988) is a Saudi Arabian footballer who plays as a midfielder.
