= Sergio Piernas =

Spanish football manager

Personal information
- Full name: Antonio Sergio Piernas Cárdenas
- Date of birth: 25 May 1976 (age 50)
- Place of birth: Barcelona, Spain

Team information
- Current team: Morocco U17

Managerial career
- Years: Team
- 1999–2005: Getafe (youth)
- 2005–2012: Atlético Madrid (youth)
- 2012: Saudi Arabia U19
- 2013–2014: Saudi Arabia (assistant)
- 2016: Dalian Yifang
- 2018–2019: Al-Ettifaq
- 2020–: Morocco U17

Antonio Sergio Piernas Cárdenas (born 25 May 1976) is a Spanish manager and current manager of Morocco U17.

== Coaching career ==
He begins his career as football Coach in 1999 during six seasons at Getafe CF Youth Academy and then he signed with Club Atlético Madrid during seven seasons where he also began to perform functions at the Methodology and Analysis Department.

Between 2012 and 2014 he had the opportunity to live his first international experience, first as Head Coach at Saudi Arabia National Team U19 during seven months, and then as Assistant Coach at First National Team headed by Juan Ramón López Caro during two years. He had the opportunity to play tournaments such as the 2015 Asian Cup Qualification, 2014 Gulf Cup, 2012 Arab Cup, accumulating a considerable number of international matches.

In 2015 he started his second stage at Atlético Madrid until 2017, where he was the Performance Supervisor of Youth Academy, Sports Director of Wanda’s Project, Manager of Performance Development for Chinese players with the aim to integrate them in professional teams, Member of Youth Academy Methodology Department and Performance Supervisor of International Projects. At the same time, during the 2015-16 season he was the First Team analyst.

In 2016, during his second stage at Atlético Madrid, in a 5 month hiatus, he had the opportunity to his second international experience at Professional football at Club Dalian Yifang in China, first as assistant in the first team and then to close the season as Head Coach being also the Manager of Development Project to professionalize the Club. Once the season ended he joined his duties at Atlético Madrid.

After finishing his second stage at Atlético Madrid, he returned to Saudi Arabia to join the club Ettifaq FC where in the season 2017-18 he worked as a coach in the sub-19 team, and in the last part of the season to become part of the professional team as an assistant and perform supervisory functions.

During the 2018-19 season, he occupied the position of head coach in the professional team of Ettifaq in the Saudi Professional League, after starting the year with other duties. he took charge of the team from day 11 along with my coaching staff.

After this stage Arabia, he currently working in the Moroccan Football Federation, where a new project to improve the development of the football. He currently managing the Morocco national under-17 football team.
