= Majed Al-Marhoum =

Saudi Arabian footballer

Personal information
- Full name: Majed Saad Al-Marhoum
- Date of birth: May 21, 1982 (age 44)
- Place of birth: Saudi Arabia
- Height: 1.83 m (6 ft 0 in)
- Position: Midfielder

Senior career*
Years	Team	Apps	(Gls)
2003–2005	Al-Kawkab		
2005–2008	Al-Hazm		
2012–2013	Al-Shabab	60	(2)
2013–2015	Al-Shoalah	2	(0)
2015–2016	Al-Feiha		
2016–2017	Al-Hazm		
2017–2018	Al-Selmiyah		
- * Club domestic league appearances and goals

Majed Al-Marhoum (Arabic: ماجد المرحوم; born May 21, 1982) is a Saudi football player who plays as a midfielder.
