= Mashari Al-Enezi =

Saudi footballer (born 1989)

Personal information
- Full name: Mashari Jodaie Al-Enezi
- Date of birth: 22 July 1989 (age 37)
- Place of birth: Hafar al-Batin, Saudi Arabia
- Height: 1.74 m (5 ft 9 in)
- Position: Forward

Team information
- Current team: Al-Ghottah
- Number: 7

Senior career*
Years	Team	Apps	(Gls)
2009–2010	Al-Qaisumah		
2010–2016	Al-Orobah		
2016–2017	Al-Batin	11	(0)
2017	→ Al-Tai (loan)	10	(4)
2017–2019	Al-Tai	67	(28)
2020	Al-Kawkab	21	(3)
2020–2022	Al-Orobah	52	(14)
2023	Al-Diriyah	10	(1)
2023–2024	Al-Zulfi		
2024–	Al-Ghottah		
- * Club domestic league appearances and goals as of 21 April 2021

Mashari Al-Enezi (Arabic: مشاري العنزي; born 22 July 1989) is a Saudi footballer who plays for Al-Ghottah as a forward.

== Career ==
Al-Enezi started his career at Al-Qaisumah and helped the team achieve promotion to the Second Division during the 2007–08 season. On 10 August 2010, he joined First Division side Al-Orobah. He helped the side achieve its first-ever promotion to the Pro League, the top tier of Saudi football. He spent 6 years at the club and scored 66 league goals for the club across the 2 divisions. On 22 June 2016, Al-Enezi joined newly promoted Pro League side Al-Batin. After only six months at Al-Batin, Al-Enezi joined Al-Tai on a six-month loan deal. On 17 July 2017, Al-Enezi joined Al-Tai on a permanent basis. He ended his first season at the club finishing as the top scorer of the MS League with 21 goals as Al-Tai narrowly missed out on promotion. On 7 July 2019, he renewed his contract with Al-Tai for a further season. After being released by Al-Tai, Al-Enezi joined Al-Kawkab on 27 December 2019. On 11 September 2023, Al-Enezi joined Second Division side Al-Zulfi. On 1 September 2024, Al-Enezi joined Al-Ghottah.
