= Sultan Al-Nemri =

Saudi Arabian footballer

Personal information
- Full name: Sultan Al-Nemri
- Date of birth: January 27, 1986 (age 40)
- Place of birth: Ta'if, Saudi Arabia
- Height: 1.78 m (5 ft 10 in)
- Position: Winger

Senior career*
Years	Team	Apps	(Gls)
2006–2012	Al-Ittihad	88	(16)
2012–2013	Al-Faisaly	13	(0)
2014–2016	Al-Wehda	42	(7)
2016–2018	Al Hazm	55	(9)
2018–2019	Al-Arabi		

International career^{‡}
2009–2011	Saudi Arabia	11	(0)
- * Club domestic league appearances and goals as of May 29, 2012 ‡ National team caps and goals as of May 29, 2012

Sultan Al-Nemri (Arabic: سلطان النمري; born 1986) is a Saudi Arabian footballer who plays as a winger.

He played for Al-Ittihad in the 2008 AFC Champions League group stages.

Al-Numari has made a few appearances for the Saudi Arabia national football team, including a 2010 FIFA World Cup qualifying match.
