= Miguel Carvalho (footballer, born 2005) =

Spanish footballer (born 2005)

Personal information
- Full name: Miguel Carvalho Vianna
- Date of birth: 9 March 2005 (age 21)
- Place of birth: Curvelo, Brazil
- Height: 1.83 m (6 ft 0 in)
- Position: Midfielder

Team information
- Current team: Chapecoense
- Number: 80

Youth career
- –2014: Barcelona
- 2014–2022: Espanyol

Senior career*
| Years | Team | Apps | (Gls) |
| 2021–2024 | Espanyol B | 65 | (4) |
| 2025–2026 | Al-Qadsiah | 1 | (0) |
| 2025 | → Mérida (loan) | 16 | (1) |
| 2025–2026 | → Al-Hazem (loan) | 17 | (0) |
| 2026– | Chapecoense | 0 | (0) |

International career^{‡}
| 2022 | Spain U17 | 12 | (4) |
| 2023 | Spain U18 | 2 | (0) |
| 2023–2024 | Spain U19 | 11 | (1) |
| 2025– | Spain U21 | 3 | (2) |
Medal record
Men's football
Representing Spain
UEFA European Under-19 Championship
| Winner | 2024 Northern Ireland |
- * Club domestic league appearances and goals as of 8 June 2025 ‡ National team caps and goals as of 14 October 2025

Miguel Carvalho Vianna (born 9 March 2005) is a professional footballer who plays as a midfielder for Chapecoense. Born in Brazil, he is a Spain youth international.

== Early life ==
Carvalho was born on 9 March 2005 in Curvelo, Brazil. A native of the city, he is the nephew of Brazil international Euller.

== Club career ==
As a youth player, Carvalho joined the youth academy of Spanish La Liga side Barcelona. Following his stint there, he joined the youth academy of Spanish La Liga side Espanyol and was promoted to the club's reserve team ahead of the 2022–23 season, where he made sixty-five league appearances and scored four goals. On 5 September 2021, he debuted for them during a 1–0 home win over Numancia in the league.

Subsequently, he signed for Saudi Arabian side Al Qadsiah in 2025. The same year, he was sent on loan to Spanish side Mérida, where he made sixteen league appearances and scored one goal. On 8 September 2025, Carvalho joined Saudi Pro League side Al-Hazem on loan.

On 23 August 2026, Carvalho returned to Brazil to join Chapecoense, signing a contract until 2028.

== International career ==
Carvalho is a Spain youth international. During the summer of 2024, he played for the Spain national under-19 football team at the 2024 UEFA European Under-19 Championship, helping the team win the competition.

== Style of play ==
Carvalho plays as a midfielder and is left-footed. Spanish newspaper Sport wrote in 2017 that he "organizes, cuts, and scores... thanks to his excellent shot and his ability to head set pieces".

== Honours ==
Spain U19

- UEFA European Under-19 Championship: 2024
