= Juan Brown =

Argentine footballer and coach

Personal information
- Full name: Juan Ignacio Brown
- Date of birth: 30 September 1977 (age 49)
- Place of birth: La Plata, Argentina
- Height: 1.85 m (6 ft 1 in)
- Position: Defender

Senior career*
| Years | Team | Apps | (Gls) |
| 1999–2001 | Estudiantes de LP | 25 | (4) |
| 2001–2002 | Barreirense | 19 | (2) |
| 2002–2003 | Los Andes | | |
| 2003–2004 | Unión de Santa Fe | | |
| 2004–2005 | The Strongest | | |
| 2005–2008 | Club Almagro | | |
| 2008 | Ferro Carril Oeste | 17 | (0) |
| 2008–2009 | Tiro Federal | 25 | (0) |
| 2009–2010 | Barracas Central | 16 | (0) |
| 2011 | Wilstermann | | |

Managerial career
- 2016–2018: Al-Hilal (assistant)
- 2018: Al-Hilal (caretaker)
- 2019: Al-Wehda
- 2021–2022: Ismaily
- 2023: Al Shabab (caretaker)
- 2023: Al Shabab (caretaker)
- 2024–2025: Al-Safa
- * Club domestic league appearances and goals

Juan Ignacio Brown (born 30 September 1977 in La Plata, Argentina) is an Argentine professional football coach and former player who most recently worked as the manager of Saudi First Division League club Al-Safa.

He has had a short spell at Al-Hilal FC at same league in the 2017-2018 season, helping them win their 15th domestic league title. Later that summer, he left the club. On 1 July 2023, it was announced that Brown would become the caretaker manager of Al Shabab until they appointed a new manager. On 6 September 2023, Brown returned to Al-Shabab following the departure of Marcel Keizer. On 8 December 2024, Brown was appointed as manager of Saudi First Division League club Al-Safa. He was sacked on 7 March 2025.

His father José Luis Brown was an Argentina international who won the 1986 FIFA World Cup.
