= Helal Al-Harbi =

Saudi Arabian footballer

Personal information
- Full name: Helal Al-Harbi
- Date of birth: September 27, 1990 (age 36)
- Place of birth: Saudi Arabia
- Height: 1.69 m (5 ft 6 1/2 in)
- Position: Winger

Youth career
- Al-Ansar

Senior career*
Years	Team	Apps	(Gls)
2010–2013	Al-Ansar		
2013–2014	Ohod		
2014–2018	Al-Ansar		
- * Club domestic league appearances and goals

Helal Al-Harbi (Arabic: هلال الحربي; born September 27, 1990) is a Saudi football player who plays a winger.
