= Shawarmer =

Middle Eastern restaurant chain

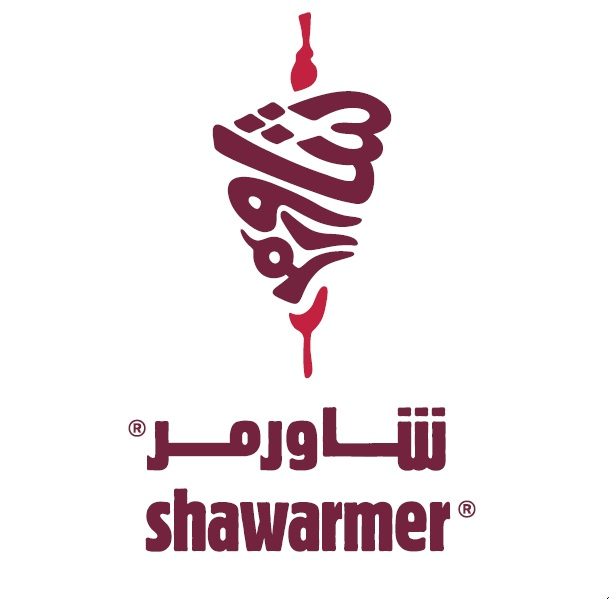
- Type: Private
- Industry: Food industry
- Founded: 1999; 27 years ago
- Founder: Abdulmohsen AlRabiah and Ahmed AlRasheed
- Headquarters: Riyadh, Saudi Arabia United Arab Emirates
- Area served: Saudi Arabia; Egypt
- Website: www.shawarmer.com

Shawarmer is a Middle Eastern quick-service restaurant chain specializing in shawarma. Shawarmer opened its first branch in Riyadh in 1999 and is currently operating in 22 cities in Saudi Arabia with 116 branches. Shawarmer's concept involves applying the Western fast-food chain model with its emphasis on consistency and food safety to the traditional shawarma shop.

== Awards ==
The company has received the following awards:

- 2009 – Listed in Saudi Fast Growth 100.
- 2010 – Listed in Saudi Fast Growth 100.
- 2013 – Shawarmer management selected as Endeavor Entrepreneur and Ranked 3rd in the Forbes most innovative Saudi entrepreneurs.
- 2016 – Top 100 Saudi Brands Award (Al Watan newspaper).
- 2017 – Marketing Pioneers Award.

== Timeline ==
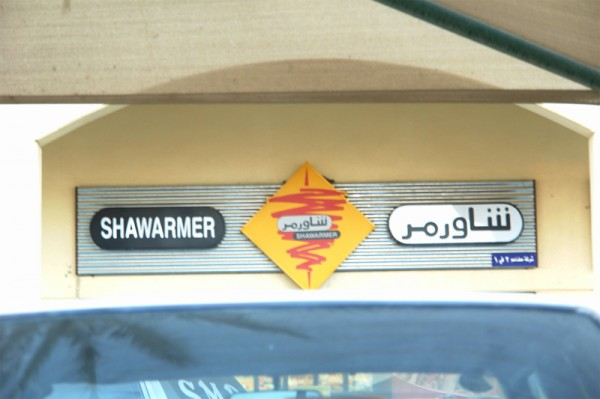
First branch in 1999

The following have been significant developments for the company:

- 1999 – Shawarmer was founded and the first branch was opened.
- 2002 – Open first main street location.
- 2003 – 5th Store milestone reached.
- 2005 – 12th Store milestone reached and first non-traditional location opened.
- 2008 – Expanded the first market outside of Riyadh and Jeddah – major brand overhaul and new re-engineered menu with a focus on multiple categories.
- 2011 – 20th Store Milestone Reached, Started franchising in Yanbu and Khobar, changed menu structure and introduced LTOs.
- 2019 – Opened its 100th restaurant.
- 2022 - Open First Branch in Egypt
