= Abdulaziz Takrouni =

Saudi Arabian footballer

Personal information
- Full name: Abdulaziz Saeed Takrouni
- Date of birth: November 25, 1991 (age 34)
- Place of birth: Jeddah, Saudi Arabia
- Position: Goalkeeper

Team information
- Current team: Jeddah
- Number: 31

Senior career*
Years	Team	Apps	(Gls)
2013–2015	Al-Ittihad	3	(0)
2015–2017	Najran	26	(0)
2017–2018	Al-Tai	15	(0)
2018–2019	Al-Washm	2	(0)
2019–2020	Al-Shoulla	11	(0)
2020	Al-Khaleej	7	(0)
2020–2021	Al-Ansar		
2021–2022	Al-Kawkab	9	(0)
2022–2024	Jeddah	29	(0)
2024–2025	Al-Hazem	1	(0)
2025–	Jeddah	0	(0)
- * Club domestic league appearances and goals

Abdulaziz Takrouni (Arabic: عبد العزيز تكروني; born November 25, 1991), is a Saudi Arabian professional footballer who plays as a goalkeeper for Jeddah.

== Career ==
Takrouni began his career at Al-Ittihad. On 8 July 2015, Takrouni joined Najran on a two-year deal. On 10 August 2017, Takrouni joined Al-Tai on a free transfer. On 1 February 2020, Takrouni joined Al-Khaleej. On 17 August 2022, Takrouni joined Jeddah. In August 2024, Takrouni joined Al-Hazem. On 13 September 2025, Takrouni rejoined Jeddah.
