= Yahia Al-Shehri =

Saudi Arabian footballer

Personal information
- Full name: Yahia Hassan Al-Shehri
- Date of birth: December 13, 1985 (age 40)
- Place of birth: Al-Kharj, Saudi Arabia
- Height: 1.70 m (5 ft 7 in)
- Position: Goalkeeper

Senior career*
Years	Team	Apps	(Gls)
2006–2007	Al-Shoalah		
2007–2012	Al-Wehda	2	(0)
2012–2013	Sdoos		
2013–2017	Al-Hazem	58	(0)
2017–2021	Al-Kawkab		
2021–2022	Al-Kholood	20	(0)
2022–2023	Tuwaiq		
2023–2024	Al-Sharq		
2024–2026	Al-Kawkab		
- * Club domestic league appearances and goals

Yahia Al-Shehri (Arabic: يحيى الشهري; born December 13, 1985) is a Saudi football player who plays a goalkeeper.
