= Waleed Al-Harbi =

Saudi Arabian footballer

Personal information
- Full name: Waleed Moaala Al-Harbi
- Date of birth: February 1, 1986 (age 40)
- Place of birth: Saudi Arabia
- Height: 1.73 m (5 ft 8 in)
- Position: Right-back

Youth career
- Al-Jewaa

Senior career*
Years	Team	Apps	(Gls)
2007–2012	Al-Taawon		
2012–2013	Al-Najma		
2013–2017	Al-Hazm		
2017–2019	Al-Bukayriyah		
2019–2022	Al-Najma		
- * Club domestic league appearances and goals

Waleed Al-Harbi (Arabic: وليد الحربي; born February 1, 1986) is a Saudi football player who plays as a right-back.
