= Jeddah Club =

Saudi association football club

- Full name: Jeddah Sports Club
- Founded: 1968; 58 years ago
- Ground: King Abdullah Sports City; Prince Abdullah Al-Faisal Sports City (selected matches)
- Capacity: 62,345; 27,000
- Chairman: Faisal Al-Saifi
- Head coach: Ian Foster
- League: First Division League
- 2025–26: FDL, 13th of 18
Home colours	Away colours

Jeddah Sports Club (Arabic: نادي جدة) is a Saudi Arabian professional football club based in Jeddah. Founded in 1968, the club competes in the Saudi First Division League, the second tier in the Saudi Arabian football league system. It has a women's section.

== History ==
The club was founded in 1968 under the name of Al-Bahri Club as a merger of five clubs; Radwa, Al-Salam, Al-Tasami, Al-Taleb, and Al-Hilal Al-Bahri. They changed their name to Al-Thagher Club before changing it once again to Al-Rabee Club in 1973. On 25 September 2016, the club once again changed their name this time to Jeddah Sports Club. The club's current president is Faisal Al-Saifi, who has been serving as the president since October 2020.

== Coaching staff ==
Position	Name
Head coach	(England) Ian Foster
Assistant coach	(Saudi Arabia) Khaled Al-Hussain
Goalkeeper coach	(Spain) Jordi Cumelles
Fitness coach	(Saudi Arabia) Yaqub Hawsawi
Development coach	(Saudi Arabia) Mohammed Al-Salman
Performance director	(Saudi Arabia) Hassan Ali
Sporting director	(Saudi Arabia) Keshim Al-Khaldi
Team doctor	(Saudi Arabia) Salem Al-Sobhi
Physiotherapist	(Saudi Arabia) Osama Al-Khenani
Administrative manager	(Saudi Arabia) Ali Misfer Al-Khathami (Saudi Arabia) Faisal Bamhrez
Team supervisor	(Saudi Arabia) Khaled Kahwaji
Administrative coordinator	(Saudi Arabia) Abdullah Hakmi

== Current squad ==
As of 31 January 2024

Note: Flags indicate national team as defined under FIFA eligibility rules; some limited exceptions apply. Players may hold more than one non-FIFA nationality.

No.	Pos.	Nation	Player
1	GK	KSA	Yasser Al-Mosailem
2	DF	KSA	Abdulrahman Al-Rio
3	DF	KSA	Mohammad Naji
4	DF	KSA	Ahmed Al-Shamrani
6	DF	KSA	Fahad Al-Sahafi
7	MF	KSA	Albaraa Baadheem
8	FW	NGR	Christ Evo
9	FW	KSA	Hussain Al-Moeini
10	MF	CRO	Martin Šroler
11	FW	KSA	Saad Al-Rashed (on loan from Neom)
12	DF	KSA	Hassan Al-Jubairi
13	DF	KSA	Faisal Al-Dhobyani
14	FW	EGY	Mohamed Rageh
15	MF	KSA	Mohammed Al-Dhefiri
17	FW	KSA	Abdullah Al-Amoudi

No.	Pos.	Nation	Player
18	MF	KSA	Alhussain Mahfoudh
19	FW	KSA	Hassan Mukhtar
24	MF	KSA	Ahmed Maher
26	DF	ESP	Carlos Jiménez (on loan from Al-Qadsiah)
31	GK	KSA	Abdulaziz Takrouni
33	DF	SOM	Faisal Othman
47	GK	KSA	Abdulrahman Al-Humairi
55	MF	GAB	Medwin Biteghé
57	MF	KSA	Rafi Matmi
66	DF	KSA	Mohammad Zamzami
70	FW	KSA	Mohammed Al-Saiari
77	FW	KSA	Hassan Bokhari
87	GK	KSA	Fares Al-Johani
90	MF	KSA	Hazzaa Al-Ghamdi
99	DF	KSA	Rayan Fallatah (on loan from Al-Faisaly)

== See also ==
- List of football clubs in Saudi Arabia
