= 2012–13 Al-Shoalah season =

Saudi Arabian Al-Shoalah
2012–13 season
- Manager: [1 - 16] (Egypt) Mohammed Salah [17- ?] (Tunisia) Ahmad Al Ajni
- Saudi Professional League: 9th
- Crown Prince Cup: Round of 16
- Top goalscorer: League: H. Tir (8); Crown Prince Cup: M. Al-Bishi (1); Abdulrahman Al-Ajlan (1); All: H. Tir (8)

For the 2012–13 season, Al-Shoalah competed in the first tier of Saudi Arabian football, Saudi Professional League.

Al-Shoalah placed ninth in the league table.

== League table ==
Pos	Team	Pld	W	D	L	GF	GA	GD	Pts	Qualification or relegation
7	Al-Ittihad	26	8	9	9	36	36	0	33	Qualification for the AFC Champions League group stage (Note: Al-Ittihad qualified for the AFC Champions League group stage as 2013 King Cup of Champions winners.)
8	Al-Raed	26	7	11	8	30	41	−11	32	Qualification for the GCC Champions League
9	Al-Shoulla	26	8	6	12	32	42	−10	30	Qualification for the GCC Champions League
10	Najran	26	6	7	13	31	52	−21	25	
11	Al-Faisaly	26	6	6	14	35	43	−8	24	

Source: SLstat
Rules for classification: 1) Points; 2) Total goal difference; 3) Total goals scored; 4) Head-to-head points; 5) Head-to-head goal difference; 6) Play-off (only for deciding champion, relegation and AFC competitions participation).

== Squad statistics ==
No.	Pos	Nat	Player	Total		Pro League		Crown Prince Cup	
No.	Pos	Nat	Player	Apps	Goals	Apps	Goals	Apps	Goals
1	GK	(Saudi Arabia) KSA	Abdulrahman Al-Ghamdi	1	0	0	0	1	0
2	FW	(Saudi Arabia) KSA	Yosef Alrshedy	10	0	10	0	0	0
3	DF	(Saudi Arabia) KSA	Mishel Al-Agmi	12	0	11	0	1	0
4	DF	(Saudi Arabia) KSA	Rashed Al Dwesan	15	0	15	0	0	0
5	DF	(Saudi Arabia) KSA	Redwan Al-Mousa	2	0	1	0	1	0
6	DF	(Ghana) GHA	Philip Boampong	16	0	15	0	1	0
7	MF	(Saudi Arabia) KSA	Turky Al-Thagafi	1	0	1	0	0	0
8	MF	(Bahrain) BHR	Abdulla Baba Fatadi	10	0	10	0	0	0
9	FW	(Saudi Arabia) KSA	Abdulrahman Al-Ajlan	6	1	5	0	1	1
10	MF	(Saudi Arabia) KSA	Wasl Al-Thowaibi	15	1	14	1	1	0
11	FW	(Saudi Arabia) KSA	Fahad Al-Munaif	11	0	9	0	2	0
12	DF	(Saudi Arabia) KSA	Abdulaziz Al-Abduassalam	4	0	3	0	1	0
13	DF	(Saudi Arabia) KSA	Burj Ali Maodah	15	1	14	1	1	0
15	MF	(Saudi Arabia) KSA	Ahmed Hebh	10	0	9	0	1	0
17	MF	(Saudi Arabia) KSA	Ahmed Al-Zaaq	11	0	11	0	0	0
18	MF	(Saudi Arabia) KSA	Fuad Al Harthi	0	0	0	0	0	0
19	FW	(Saudi Arabia) KSA	Turki Elewah	3	0	3	0	0	0
20	MF	(Saudi Arabia) KSA	Misfer Al-Bishi	10	2	10	2	0	0
21	GK	(Saudi Arabia) KSA	Khaled Naseer	14	0	14	0	0	0
22	GK	(Saudi Arabia) KSA	Saeed Al-Harbi	4	0	4	0	0	0
23	DF	(Saudi Arabia) KSA	Yahya Kabi	14	0	13	0	1	0
24	DF	(Saudi Arabia) KSA	Meshaal Al-Mutairi	10	0	10	0	0	0
26	MF	(Saudi Arabia) KSA	Mohammed Alqarni	19	1	18	1	1	0
27	MF	(Saudi Arabia) KSA	Meshal Al-Mouri	6	0	6	0	0	0
28	FW	(Morocco) MAR	Hassan Tir	16	8	16	8	0	0
29	MF	(Mali) MLI	Lassana Fané	17	4	16	4	1	0
30	FW	(Saudi Arabia) KSA	Abdullah Al-Tofail	0	0	0	0	0	0
33	DF	(Saudi Arabia) KSA	Jaber Hagawi	1	0	1	0	0	0
34	DF	(Saudi Arabia) KSA	Fahad Al-Dossary	0	0	0	0	0	0
99	DF	(Saudi Arabia) KSA	Ahmad Saad	9	0	9	0	0	0

=== Top scorers ===
Place	Position	Nation	Number	Name	Pro League	Crown Prince Cup	Total
1	FW	(Morocco)	28	Hassan Tir	8	0	8
2	MF	(Mali)	29	Lassana Fané	4	0	4
3	FW	(Saudi Arabia)	11	Fahad Al-Munaif	2	0	2
3	MF	(Saudi Arabia)	20	Misfer Al-Bishi	2	0	2
4	MF	(Saudi Arabia)	15	Ahmed Hebh	1	0	1
4	MF	(Saudi Arabia)	10	Wasl Al-Thowaibi	1	0	1
4	MF	(Saudi Arabia)	26	Mohammed Alqarni	1	0	1
4	DF	(Saudi Arabia)	13	Burj Ali Maodah	1	0	1
4	FW	(Saudi Arabia)	9	Abdulrahman Al-Ajlan	0	1	1
				TOTALS	20	1	21

=== Disciplinary record ===
Number	Nation	Position	Name	Pro League		Crown Prince Cup		Total	
Number	Nation	Position	Name	Yellow card	Red card	Yellow card	Red card	Yellow card	Red card
29	(Mali)	MF	Lassana Fané	7	0	0	0	7	0
13	(Saudi Arabia)	DF	Burj Ali Maodah	5	0	0	0	5	0
6	(Ghana)	DF	Philip Boampong	3	0	1	0	4	0
2	(Saudi Arabia)	FW	Yosef Alrshedy	3	0	0	0	3	0
4	(Saudi Arabia)	DF	Rashed Al Dwesan	3	0	0	0	3	0
8	(Bahrain)	MF	Abdulla Baba Fatadi	3	0	0	0	3	0
17	(Saudi Arabia)	MF	Ahmed Al-Zaaq	3	0	0	0	3	0
23	(Saudi Arabia)	DF	Yahya Kabi	2	0	1	0	3	0
10	(Saudi Arabia)	MF	Wasl Al-Thowaibi	2	0	0	0	2	0
28	(Morocco)	FW	Hassan Tir	2	0	0	0	2	0
26	(Saudi Arabia)	MF	Mohammed Alqarni	2	0	0	0	2	0
15	(Saudi Arabia)	MF	Ahmed Hebh	2	0	0	0	2	0
14	(Saudi Arabia)	DF	Sultan Tamihi	1	0	0	0	1	0
22	(Saudi Arabia)	GK	Saeed Al-Harbi	1	0	0	0	1	0
21	(Saudi Arabia)	GK	Khaled Naseer	1	0	0	0	1	0
99	(Saudi Arabia)	MF	Ahmad Saad	1	0	0	0	1	0
			TOTALS	41	0	2	0	43	0

== Transfers ==
=== Summer Transfers ===
==== In ====
P	No.	Nat.	Name	Age	From	Deal Type	Source
CF	11	(Saudi Arabia)	Fahad Al-Munaif	23	(Saudi Arabia) Al Shabab	Loan	
DF	5	(Saudi Arabia)	Redwan Al-Mousa	22	(Saudi Arabia) Al-Hilal	Loan	
GK	22	(Saudi Arabia)	Saeed Al-Harbi	31	(Saudi Arabia) Al Hazm	Transfer	
MF	8	(Bahrain)	Abdulla Baba Fatadi	27	(Kuwait) Al Jahra	Transfer	epoca_id=142&id=63562]
DM	29	(Mali)	Lassana Fané	25	Kuwait	Transfer	epoca_id=142&id=63562]
CF	28	(Morocco)	Hassan Tir	30	(Morocco) Raja Casablanca	Transfer	epoca_id=142&id=63562]
CB	6	(Ghana)	Philip Boampong	22	(Ghana) Hearts of Oak	Transfer	

=== Winter Transfers ===
==== In ====
P	No.	Nat.	Name	Age	From	Deal Type	Source
DF		(Saudi Arabia)	Ahmed Dalah	25	(Saudi Arabia) Al-Faisaly	Transfer	
DF	34	(Saudi Arabia)	A-R. Al-Baraka	22	(Saudi Arabia) Al Shabab	Loan	
DF	42	(Saudi Arabia)	M. Al-Ghlemesh	22	(Saudi Arabia) Al Shabab	Loan	

== Results ==
=== Pro League ===
2 August 2012 1	Al-Ahli	5 – 0	Al-Shoalah	Prince Abdullah al-Faisal Stadium, Jeddah
15:30	Victor Simões 12'; Al-Mehyani 33'; Al-Fahmi 35'; Al-Jassim 42'; Al-Mehyani 57'	Report		Attendance: 11, 344; Referee: Turki Al-Khudair

6 August 2012 2	Al-Wahda	2 – 3	Al-Shoalah	King Abdul Aziz Stadium, Mecca
15:30	Aseri 53'; Al-Qorashi 85'	Report	Tir 48'; Fané 55'; Tir 71'	Attendance: 743; Referee: Shukri Al-Hanfosh

23 August 2012 3	Al-Shoalah	2 – 3	Al-Fateh	Al-Shoalah Club Stadium, Al Kharj
13:40	Tir 11', 45'	Report	Élton 31' (pen.); Fuakumputu 59', 89'	Attendance: 160; Referee: Mishari Al-Mishari

27 August 2012 4	Al-Shoalah	1 – 5	Najran	Al-Shoalah Club Stadium, Al Kharj
13:40	Tir 70'	Report	Salem 4', 7'; Al-Dardour 78'; Al-Rabaei 80'; Khrees 89'	Attendance: 77; Referee: Abdulrahman-Al Ahmri

1 September 2012 5	Al-Faisaly	0 – 2	Al-Shoalah	Prince Salman Bin Abdulaziz Sport City Stadium, Harmah
13:35		Report	Al-Thowaibi 45'; Hebh 85'	Attendance: 1,050; Referee: Meree Al-Awagi

14 September 2012 6	Al-Shoalah	1 – 3	Al-Hilal	Al-Shoalah Club Stadium, Al Kharj
13:25	Al-Bishi 82'	Report	Wesley 20'; Yoo 85'; Al-Qarni 90+3'	Attendance: 3,455; Referee: Mohammed Al-Hoaish

21 September 2012 7	Al-Shoalah	1 – 0	Al-Taawon	Al-Shoalah Club Stadium, Al Kharj
13:15	Maodha	Report		Attendance: 374; Referee: Abbas Ibrahim

28 September 2012 8	Al Shabab	1 – 2	Al-Shoalah	King Fahd Stadium, Riyadh
13:10	Alqarni 73'	Report	Al-Shamrani 4'; Marcelo Camacho 29'	Attendance: 1,120; Referee: Khaled Salwi

4 October 2012 9	Al-Raed	2 – 2	Al-Shoalah	King Abdullah Sport City Stadium, Buraidah
13:00	Al-Kaabi 37'; Diba 52'	Report	Fané 2' (pen.), 78'	Attendance: 1,243; Referee: Abbas Ibrahim

19 October 2012 10	Al-Shoalah	0 – 1	Al-Ettifaq	Al-Shoalah Club Stadium, Al Kharj
12:50		Report	Júnior Xuxa 7'	Attendance: 350; Referee: Sami Al Nemri

2 November 2012 11	Al Nassr	1 – 3	Al-Shoalah	King Fahd Stadium, Riyadh
12:50	Ayoví 56'; Al-Sahlawi 80'; Rabo 88'	Report	Al-Munaif 85'	Attendance: 900; Referee: Abdulaziz Al Funaitel

8 November 2012 12	Al-Shoalah	0 – 0	Hajer	Al-Shoalah Club Stadium, Al Kharj
11:40		Report		Attendance: 180; Referee: Mohammed Al Nuhait

22 November 2012 13	Ittihad	0 – 1	Al-Shoalah	PAF Stadium, Jeddah
11:35	Al-Sibyani 90+4'	Report		Attendance: 7398; Referee: Mohammed Al Hoaish

4 December 2012 14	Al-Shoalah	1 – 3	Al-Ahli	Al-Shoalah Club Stadium, Al Kharj
11:35	Tir 32'	Report	Victor Simões 10', 38', 46'	Attendance: 1500; Referee: Fahad Al Mirdasi

13 December 2012 15	Al-Shoalah	1 – 0	Al-Wahda	Al-Shoalah Club Stadium, Al Kharj
07:10	Fané 68'	Report		Attendance: 154; Referee: Abdulaziz Al Funaitel

27 December 2012 16	Al-Fateh	2 – 1	Al-Shoalah	Prince Abdullah bin Jalawi Stadium, Al-Hasa
07:00	Élton 15' Al-Maqahoy 29'	Report	Al-Munaif 47'	Attendance: 1340; Referee: Khaled Salwi

24 January 2013 17	Najran	2 – 1	Al-Shoalah	Al Akhdoud Club Stadium, Najran
07:55	Al-Bishi 17' Tir 79'	Report	Al-Dardour 63'	Attendance: 280; Referee: Saleh Al Hathlool

30 January 2013 18	Al-Shoalah	1 – 1	Al-Faisaly	Al-Shoalah Club Stadium, Al Kharj
12:05	Tir 86'	Report	Al-Mutari 16'	Attendance: 60; Referee: Abdulrahman Al Amri

=== Crown Prince Cup ===
18 December 2012 Round of 16	Al-Ahli	4 – 1	Al-Shoalah	King Abdul Aziz Stadium, Mecca
11:40	Victor Simões 8', 22'; Al Hosmi 60'; Al-Jassim 46'	Report	Al-Ajlan 69'	Referee: Shukri Al Hanfosh
