= 2016–17 Al-Batin F.C. season =

Al-Batin
2016–17 season
- President: Nasser Al-Huwaidi
- Manager: Adel Abdelrahman (until 6 November 2016); Khalid Al-Koroni (from 6 November 2016)
- Stadium: Al-Batin Club Stadium
- SPL: 12th
- Crown Prince Cup: Quarter-finals
- King Cup: Round of 32
- Top goalscorer: League: Jorge Silva (12); All: Jorge Silva (13)
- Highest home attendance: 5,800 vs Al-Ittihad (24 October 2016)
- Lowest home attendance: 473 vs Al-Fateh (25 November 2016)
- Average home league attendance: 2,609
Home colours	Away colours
- All statistics correct as of 4 May 2017.

The 2016–17 season was Al-Batin's first season in Pro League (and their first ever season in the top-flight) after gaining promotion in the previous season. This season Al-Batin participated in the Pro League, King Cup and Crown Prince Cup. The season covered the period from 1 July 2016 to 30 June 2017.

== Players ==
=== Squad information ===
As of 31 January 2017

Note: Flags indicate national team as defined under FIFA eligibility rules; some limited exceptions apply. Players may hold more than one non-FIFA nationality.

No.	Pos.	Nation	Player
1	GK	KSA	Nasser Al-Mehaini
3	DF	KSA	Bander Nasser
4	DF	KSA	Ahmed Al-Shamrani (on loan from Al-Ittihad)
5	MF	KSA	Naif Eisa (Captain)
7	MF	KSA	Mohanna Waqes
8	MF	KSA	Dhari Al-Suwait
10	MF	KSA	Jadaan Mohanna
12	FW	BRA	Jhonnattann Benites
13	DF	KSA	Majed Mansor
14	MF	KSA	Khaled Dakheel
15	MF	KSA	Abdulmajeed Obaid
16	FW	KSA	Mohammed Al-Harthi (on loan from Al-Ahli)
17	DF	KSA	Meshal Khalaf
18	MF	KSA	Maan Khodari
20	FW	KSA	Sahow Metlaq

No.	Pos.	Nation	Player
21	GK	KSA	Mansoor Al-Najai
22	DF	BRA	William Alves
24	MF	KSA	Waleed Al-Enezi (on loan from Al-Shabab)
25	MF	KSA	Khaled Al-Zylaeei
26	GK	KSA	Mazyad Freeh
27	MF	KSA	Abdullah Al-Jouei
31	DF	KSA	Sultan Ghunaiman
44	DF	KSA	Naif Mansor
78	MF	KSA	Mohsen Al-Eisa
80	FW	KSA	Badr Bander
85	FW	BRA	Tarabai (on loan from Hibernians)
88	MF	KSA	Riyadh Al-Ibrahim (on loan from Hajer)
90	DF	KSA	Jamal Al-Dhefiri
99	FW	BRA	Jorge Silva

== Transfers ==
=== In ===
Date	Pos.	Name	Previous club	Fee	Source
21 June 2016	FW	(Saudi Arabia) Mashari Al-Enezi	(Saudi Arabia) Al-Orobah	Free	
1 August 2016	FW	(Brazil) Jorge Silva	(Malta) Hibernians	Free	
9 August 2016	GK	(Saudi Arabia) Mansoor Al-Najai	(Saudi Arabia) Al-Faisaly	Free	
10 August 2016	DF	(Brazil) Nino	(Kuwait) Al-Jahra	Free	
18 August 2016	MF	(Saudi Arabia) Abdulaziz Al-Dhiyabi	(Saudi Arabia) Al-Nassr	Free	
22 August 2016	MF	(Mali) Lassana Fané	(Morocco) Khouribga	Free	
25 August 2016	MF	(Saudi Arabia) Naif Mansor	(Saudi Arabia) Al-Mujazzel	Free	
8 September 2016	MF	(Egypt) Ahmed Hamoudi	(Switzerland) Basel	Free	
9 September 2016	FW	(Saudi Arabia) Hassan Sharahili	(Saudi Arabia) Al-Drae	Free	
21 September 2016	DF	(Brazil) William Alves	(Portugal) Vitória	Free	
8 January 2017	MF	(Saudi Arabia) Abdullah Al-Jouei	(Saudi Arabia) Al-Hilal	Free	
16 January 2017	MF	(Saudi Arabia) Maan Khodari	(Saudi Arabia) Najran	Free	
17 January 2017	MF	(Brazil) Jhonnattann Benites	(Malta) Valletta	Free	
17 January 2017	MF	(Saudi Arabia) Khaled Al-Zylaeei	(Saudi Arabia) Al-Faisaly	Free	
27 February 2017	MF	(Saudi Arabia) Mohsen Al-Eisa		Free	

=== Loans in ===
Date	Pos.	Name	Parent club	End date	Source
17 July 2016	MF	(Saudi Arabia) Waleed Al-Enezi	(Saudi Arabia) Al-Shabab	End of season	
14 September 2016	DF	(Saudi Arabia) Ahmed Al-Shamrani	(Saudi Arabia) Al-Ittihad	End of season	
6 January 2017	FW	(Brazil) Tarabai	(Malta) Hibernians	End of season	
16 January 2017	FW	(Saudi Arabia) Mohammed Al-Harthi	(Saudi Arabia) Al-Ahli	End of season	
31 January 2017	MF	(Saudi Arabia) Riyadh Al-Ibrahim	(Saudi Arabia) Hajer	End of season	

=== Out ===
Date	Pos.	Name	New club	Fee	Source
15 August 2016	MF	(Saudi Arabia) Fahad Al-Dossari	(Saudi Arabia) Al-Qaisumah	Free	
4 September 2016	MF	(Saudi Arabia) Mousa Haqawi	(Saudi Arabia) Al-Qaisumah	Free	
1 October 2016	DF	(Brazil) Nino	Released		
1 January 2017	MF	(Mali) Lassana Fané	Released		
31 January 2017	MF	(Egypt) Ahmed Hamoudi	(Egypt) Al-Ahly	Undisclosed	
31 January 2017	MF	(Saudi Arabia) Abdulaziz Al-Dhiyabi	(Saudi Arabia) Al-Shoulla	Free	
8 February 2017	FW	(Saudi Arabia) Faisal Ayyadah	(Saudi Arabia) Al-Orobah	Free	

=== Loans out ===
Date	Pos.	Name	Subsequent club	End date	Source
28 January 2017	FW	(Saudi Arabia) Mashari Al-Enezi	(Saudi Arabia) Al-Tai	End of season	
31 January 2017	FW	(Saudi Arabia) Hassan Sharahili	(Saudi Arabia) Damac	End of season	

== Pre-season friendlies ==
22 July 2016	El Sekka El Hadid (Egypt)	0–0	(Saudi Arabia) Al-Batin
16:30 AST

25 July 2016	Ismaily (Egypt)	1–1	(Saudi Arabia) Al-Batin	Ismailia, Egypt
19:00 AST	Eid 50'	Report	Al-Dhefiri 30'	Stadium: Mercure Hotel Stadium

28 July 2016	El Sharkia Leldukhan (Egypt)	0–0	(Saudi Arabia) Al-Batin
19:00 AST

== Competitions ==
=== Overall ===
Competition	Started round	Current position / round	Final position / round	First match	Last match
Professional League	—	—	12th	13 August 2016	4 May 2017
Crown Prince Cup	Round of 32	—	Quarter-finals	25 August 2016	24 October 2016
King Cup	Round of 32	—	Round of 32	18 January 2017	18 January 2017

Last Updated: 4 May 2017

=== Pro League ===
==== League table ====
Pos	Team	Pld	W	D	L	GF	GA	GD	Pts	Qualification or relegation
10	Al-Qadisiyah	26	6	10	10	38	38	0	28 (Note: Al-Faisaly finished ahead of Al-Qadisiyah on head-to-head points: Al-Qadisiyah 1–1 Al-Faisaly, Al-Faisaly 3–2 Al-Qadisiyah)	
11	Al-Ettifaq	26	7	6	13	31	45	−14	27	
12	Al-Batin (O)	26	6	8	12	31	43	−12	26	Qualification to relegation play-off
13	Al-Khaleej (R)	26	5	8	13	32	51	−19	23	Relegation to First Division
14	Al-Wehda (R)	26	5	2	19	35	65	−30	17	Relegation to First Division

Updated to match(es) played on 4 May 2017. Source: slstat.com
Rules for classification: 1) Points; 2) Head-to-head points; 3) Head-to-head goal difference; 4) Total goal difference; 5) Total goals scored; 6) Play-off (only for deciding champion, relegation and AFC competitions participation).
(O) Play-off winners; (R) Relegated

==== Results summary ====
Overall								Home						Away					
Pld	W	D	L	GF	GA	GD	Pts	W	D	L	GF	GA	GD	W	D	L	GF	GA	GD
26	6	8	12	31	43	−12	26	6	4	3	16	10	+6	0	4	9	15	33	−18

Last updated: 4 May 2016.
Source: Competitive matches

==== Results by round ====
Round	1	2	3	4	5	6	7	8	9	10	11	12	13	14	15	16	17	18	19	20	21	22	23	24	25	26
Ground	A	H	A	A	H	H	A	A	H	H	A	H	H	H	A	H	H	A	A	H	H	A	A	H	A	A
Result	L	W	D	L	W	D	L	L	L	D	L	W	D	L	L	W	W	L	D	D	L	D	L	W	L	D
Position	12	7	7	10	8	8	9	9	11	10	10	9	9	10	13	10	8	10	10	10	11	11	12	11	12	12

Updated to match(es) played on 4 May 2017. Source: Competitive matches
A = Away; H = Home; W = Win; D = Draw; L = Loss

==== Matches ====
All times are local, AST (UTC+3).

Win Draw Loss Postponed

13 August 2016 1	Al-Hilal	2–0	Al-Batin	Riyadh
20:45	Al-Breik (yellow card) 7'; Al-Shamrani 74'; Al-Qahtani 87'	Report		Stadium: King Fahd International Stadium; Attendance: 15,371; Referee: Saleh Al-Hathloul

20 August 2016 2	Al-Batin	1–0	Al-Shabab	Hafar al-Batin
19:10	Jorge Santos 3'; Mohanna (yellow card) 26'; Al-Enezi (yellow card) 83'; Ayyadah (yellow card) 90+6'	Report	Sharahili (yellow card) 44'	Stadium: Al-Batin Club Stadium; Attendance: 3,020; Referee: Fahad Al-Oraini

16 September 2016 3	Al-Khaleej	2–2	Al-Batin	Khobar
18:25	Jandson (yellow card) 51', (goal) 67'; Majrashi 86', (yellow card) 89'	Report	Jorge Santos 30'; Al-Enezi (yellow card) 42'; Ayyadah 90+3'	Stadium: Prince Saud bin Jalawi Stadium; Attendance: 112; Referee: Mohammed Al-Qarni

21 September 2016 4	Al-Ettifaq	2–1	Al-Batin	Dammam
20:25	Fofana 9'; Bouba (yellow card) 44'; Al-Kwikbi 76'	Report	Al-Enezi 2'; Ayyadah (yellow card) 71'; Dakheel (yellow card) 83'	Stadium: Prince Mohamed bin Fahd Stadium; Attendance: 2,246; Referee: Hussain Abu Shaheen

14 October 2016 5	Al-Batin	4–0	Al-Raed	Hafar al-Batin
18:10	Jorge Santos 8', 66'; Ayyadah 52'; Al-Dhefiri (yellow card) 75'; Alves 79'	Report	Gilmar (yellow card) 28' (yellow-red card) 57'; Al-Rashidi (yellow card) 30'; Al-Amri (yellow card) 50'	Stadium: Al-Batin Club Stadium; Attendance: 1,002; Referee: Majed Al-Shamrani

21 October 2016 6	Al-Batin	1–1	Al-Qadisiyah	Hafar al-Batin
18:00	Nasser (yellow card) 48'; Hamoudi 70'; Ghunaiman (yellow card) 72'	Report	Ferreira 8'; Barnawi (yellow card) 19'; Al-Amri (yellow card) 59'; Abdul-Amir (yellow card) 61' (yellow-red card) 66'; Assiri (yellow card) 78'	Stadium: Al-Batin Club Stadium; Attendance: 1,017; Referee: Saleh Al-Hethlol

29 October 2016 7	Al-Wehda	5–1	Al-Batin	Makkah
19:50	Lima 3'; Fallatah 26', 69', 77'; Al Baour (yellow card) 42'; Khattab 84'	Report	Ayyadah 32'	Stadium: King Abdul Aziz Stadium; Attendance: 603; Referee: Mohammed Al-Nuhait

3 November 2016 8	Al-Ittihad	2–0	Al-Batin	Jeddah
20:00	Al-Sumairi (yellow card) 60'; Fallatah 72'; Al-Muwallad 80'	Report	Al-Enezi (yellow card) 2'	Stadium: King Abdullah Sports City; Attendance: 16,898; Referee: Fahad Al-Mirdasi

20 November 2016 9	Al-Batin	0–1	Al-Ahli	Hafar al-Batin
19:45	Waqes (yellow card) 22'; Dakheel (yellow card) 62'; Mohanna (yellow card) 90+4'	Report	Hawsawi 43', (yellow card) 73'; Ali Awagi (yellow card) 66'; Carlos (yellow card) 75'	Stadium: Al-Batin Club Stadium; Attendance: 1,644; Referee: Mishari Al-Mishari

25 November 2016 10	Al-Batin	1–1	Al-Fateh	Hafar al-Batin
17:40	Ghunaiman 53'; Waqes (yellow card) 59'	Report	Al-Hamdan 46'; Hazzazi (yellow card) 53' (yellow-red card) 89'	Stadium: Al-Batin Club Stadium; Attendance: 473; Referee: Fahad Al-Oraini

1 December 2016 11	Al-Nassr	4–0	Al-Batin	Riyadh
19:40	Al-Raheb 13', 22', (yellow card) 17'; Akash 35' (pen.); Hawsawi (yellow card) 46'; Al-Sahlawi 83'	Report	Fané (yellow card) 53'	Stadium: Prince Faisal bin Fahd Stadium; Attendance: 4,431; Referee: Shukri Al-Hanfosh

8 December 2016 12	Al-Batin	1–0	Al-Taawoun	Hafar al-Batin
17:45	Ayyadah (yellow card) 24'; Jorge Santos 45+2'; Al-Muheeni (yellow card) 90'	Report	Sandro (yellow card) 41' (yellow-red card) 90+2'; Machado (yellow card) 90+6'; Al-Olayan (yellow card) 90+7'	Stadium: Al-Batin Club Stadium; Attendance: 2,577; Referee: Faisal Al-Balawi

15 December 2016 13	Al-Batin	0–0	Al-Faisaly	Hafar al-Batin
15:05	Ghunaiman (yellow card) 82'	Report	Fallatah (yellow card) 52'; Awaji (yellow card) 53'	Stadium: Al-Batin Club Stadium; Attendance: 2,927; Referee: Mohammed Al-Hoaish

21 December 2016 14	Al-Batin	0–2	Al-Hilal	Hafar al-Batin
19:45	Alves (yellow card) 45+1'; Ayyadah (yellow card) 86'	Report	Carlos Eduardo (yellow card) 19' (yellow-red card) 19'; Tiago (yellow card) 42'; Bonatini 45+3'; Al-Breik (yellow card) 52'; Al-Dawsari 73'; Al-Hafith (yellow card) 83'	Stadium: Al-Batin Club Stadium; Attendance: 4,583; Referee: Mohammed Al-Qarni

30 December 2016 15	Al-Shabab	3–1	Al-Batin	Riyadh
17:55	Otaif 37'; Al-Bishi 58'; Al-Maghrebi (yellow card) 63'; Al-Dossari (yellow card) 89'; Al-Asta 89'	Report	Jorge Santos 76' (pen.); Ghunaiman (yellow card) 88'	Stadium: Prince Faisal bin Fahd Stadium; Attendance: 658; Referee: Mishari Al-Mishari

27 January 2017 16	Al-Batin	1–0	Al-Khaleej	Hafar al-Batin
15:35	Metlaq 78'	Report	François (red card) 38'	Stadium: Al-Batin Club Stadium; Attendance: 2,207; Referee: Fahad Al-Mirdasi

2 February 2017 17	Al-Batin	2–0	Al-Ettifaq	Hafar al-Batin
15:35	Jorge Santos 19' (pen.); Tarabai 56'; Freeh (yellow card) 59'; Al-Enezi (yellow card) 68'	Report	Al-Dossari (yellow card) 90+1'	Stadium: Al-Batin Club Stadium; Attendance: 2,927; Referee: Turki Al-Khudair

12 February 2017 18	Al-Raed	2–1	Al-Batin	Buraidah
18:35	Bangoura 13', 38', (yellow card) 30'; Al-Ayyaf (yellow card) 33'	Report	Ghunaiman (yellow card) 28'; Jhonnattann (yellow card) 30', (goal) 89'; Nasser (yellow card) 90+4'	Stadium: King Abdullah Sport City Stadium; Attendance: 1,773; Referee: Fahad Al-Oraini

18 February 2017 19	Al-Qadisiyah	1–1	Al-Batin	Dammam
18:15	Al-Khabrani (yellow card) 43', (goal) 59'; Eze (yellow card) 45'	Report	Jhonnattann 24'	Stadium: Prince Mohamed bin Fahd Stadium; Attendance: 63; Referee: Sami Al-Jires

3 March 2017 20	Al-Batin	1–1	Al-Wehda	Hafar al-Batin
18:35	Tarabai (yellow card) 22', (goal) 34'; Nasser (yellow card) 69'	Report	Al-Dossari (yellow card) 45+3'; Fallatah 51' (pen.)	Stadium: Al-Batin Club Stadium; Attendance: 5,222; Referee: Khaled Al-Teris

14 March 2017 21	Al-Batin	0–1	Al-Ittihad	Hafar al-Batin
18:40	Tarabai (yellow card) 15'; Khodari (yellow card) 90+4'	Report	Qassem (yellow card) 17'; Akaïchi 59'; Al-Najar (yellow card) 90'	Stadium: Al-Batin Club Stadium; Attendance: 4,002; Referee: Mohammed Al-Qarni

7 April 2017 22	Al-Ahli	1–1	Al-Batin	Jeddah
20:40	Fetfatzidis (yellow card) 37'; Al-Fatil (yellow card) 41'; Al-Moasher 59'	Report	Al-Eisa (yellow card) 52'; Jhonnattann 78'; Freeh (yellow card) 89'	Stadium: King Abdullah Sports City; Attendance: 6,219; Referee: Stefan Johannesson (Sweden)

15 April 2017 23	Al-Fateh	3–2	Al-Batin	Al-Hasa
18:45	Oueslati 32', 76' (pen.); Al-Ammar (yellow card) 45+2'; Al-Hamdan (yellow card) 60'; Buhimed 88'; Al-Bulaihi (yellow card) 90+2'	Report	Jorge Santos 31'; Ghunaiman (yellow card) 54'; Jhonnattan 59', (yellow card) 87'; Freeh (yellow card) 80'	Stadium: Prince Abdullah bin Jalawi Stadium; Attendance: 5,111; Referee: Pavel Královec (Czech Republic)

21 April 2017 24	Al-Batin	4–3	Al-Nassr	Hafar al-Batin
19:05	Jhonnattann 30', 78'; Jorge Santos 61', 73', (yellow card) 74'; Nasser (yellow card) 62'	Report	Al-Raheb 17', 22'; Tomečak (yellow card) 25'; Al-Sahlawi 90+5'	Stadium: Al-Batin Club Stadium; Attendance: 2,320; Referee: Sultan Al-Harbi

29 April 2017 25	Al-Taawoun	4–3	Al-Batin	Buraidah
19:15	Al-Saiari 21', 59'; N'Diaye 45+1'; Al-Dossari 55'; Machado (yellow card) 74'	Report	Al-Shamrani (yellow card) 35'; Al-Enezi (yellow card) 48'; Tarabai 75'; Metlaq 80'; Jhonnattann 83'	Stadium: King Abdullah Sport City Stadium; Attendance: 2,404; Referee: Khaled Salwi

4 May 2017 26	Al-Faisaly	2–2	Al-Batin	Al Majma'ah
20:50	Axente 2'; Rossi (yellow card) 67'; Al-Sowayed (yellow card) 73'; Majrashi 86'; Al-Bishi (yellow card) 89'	Report	Al-Enezi (yellow card) 6'; Jorge Santos 70' (pen.), 90' (pen.)	Stadium: King Salman Sport City Stadium; Attendance: 515; Referee: Fahad Al-Mirdasi

==== Relegation play-offs ====
As a result of Al-Batin finishing in twelfth place, they faced Najran the 3rd-placed of the First Division for the play-offs. All times are local, AST (UTC+3).

11 May 2017 Relegation play-offs	Najran	0–1	Al-Batin	Abha
19:15	Bashir (yellow card) 25'; Majrashi (yellow card) 26'	Report	Tarabai 16'; Metlaq (yellow card) 87'	Stadium: Prince Sultan bin Abdul Aziz Stadium; Referee: Khaled Al-Teris

16 May 2017 Relegation play-offs	Al-Batin	2–2	Najran	Hafar al-Batin
19:20	Jorge Santos 39', (yellow card) 90+4'; Dakheel 55'; Tarabai (yellow card) 59'; Metlaq (yellow card) 79'; Waqes (yellow card) 90+1'; Al-Eisa (yellow card) 90+2'	Report	Al-Mansor 51'; Al-Robeai 52'; Maqbol (yellow card) 82'	Stadium: Al-Batin Club Stadium; Referee: Turki Al-Khudair

=== Crown Prince Cup ===
All times are local, AST (UTC+3).

25 August 2016 Round of 32	Al-Shoulla	0–0 (a.e.t.) (4–5 p)	Al-Batin	Al-Kharj
19:00				Stadium: Al-Shoulla Club Stadium; Referee: Mohammed Al-Smail
	Penalties
	Al-Agmi (penalty scored); Al-Aliweh (penalty missed); Attiyah (penalty scored); Al Dossari (penalty scored); Diba Ilunga (penalty missed); Al-Sobeai (penalty scored); Al-Rabee (penalty missed)		(penalty scored) Ghunaiman; (penalty missed) Santos; (penalty scored) Jorge; (penalty scored) Nasser; (penalty missed) Ayyadah; (penalty scored) Dakheel; (penalty scored) Mohanna

29 September 2016 Round of 16	Al-Taawoun	0–2	Al-Batin	Buraidah
18:35	Al-Shammeri (yellow card) 37'; Al-Hussain (yellow card) 90+3'	Report	Silva 74'; W. Al-Enezi (yellow card) 90+3', (goal) 90+5'	Stadium: King Abdullah Sport City Stadium; Referee: Faisal Al-Balawi

24 October 2016 Quarter-finals	Al-Batin	0–1	Al-Ittihad	Hafar al-Batin
18:00	Nasser (yellow card) 13'; Freeh (yellow card) 57'	Report	Al-Muwallad 58' (pen.); Al-Muziel (yellow card) 65'; Assiri (yellow card) 67'; Villanueva (yellow card) 83'; Al-Qarni (yellow card) 90+3'	Stadium: Al-Batin Club Stadium; Attendance: 5,800; Referee: Shukri Al-Hunfush

=== King Cup ===
18 January 2017 Round of 32	Al-Adalh	3–2	Al-Batin	Al-Hasa
15:20	Al-Zowayed 9', 47'; Abdoh Jaber 70'	Report	Obaid 33'; Dakheel 53'	Stadium: Prince Abdullah bin Jalawi Stadium; Referee: Mishari Al-Mishari

== Statistics ==
=== Squad statistics ===
As of 16 May 2017.

No.	Pos	Nat	Player	Total		Pro League		King Cup		Crown Prince Cup	
No.	Pos	Nat	Player	Apps	Goals	Apps	Goals	Apps	Goals	Apps	Goals
1	GK	(Saudi Arabia)	Nasser Al-Mehaini	1	0	1	0	0	0	0	0
3	DF	(Saudi Arabia)	Bander Nasser	31	0	27	0	1	0	3	0
4	DF	(Saudi Arabia)	Ahmed Al-Shamrani	9	0	7+1	0	0	0	1	0
5	MF	(Saudi Arabia)	Naif Eisa	13	0	7+6	0	0	0	0	0
6	DF	(Brazil)	Nino*	4	0	3	0	0	0	1	0
7	MF	(Saudi Arabia)	Mohanna Waqes	31	0	27	0	1	0	3	0
8	MF	(Saudi Arabia)	Dhari Al-Suwait	0	0	0	0	0	0	0	0
9	FW	(Saudi Arabia)	Mashari Al-Enezi*	14	0	5+6	0	0+1	0	1+1	0
10	MF	(Saudi Arabia)	Jadaan Mohanna	22	0	12+6	0	1	0	3	0
11	MF	(Saudi Arabia)	Abdulaziz Al-Dhiyabi*	3	0	0+2	0	0	0	0+1	0
12	FW	(Brazil)	Jhonnattann Benites	13	7	13	7	0	0	0	0
13	DF	(Saudi Arabia)	Majed Mansor	3	0	0+2	0	0	0	0+1	0
14	MF	(Saudi Arabia)	Khaled Dakheel	21	2	11+7	1	1	1	2	0
15	MF	(Saudi Arabia)	Abdulmajeed Obaid	5	1	0+4	0	1	1	0	0
16	FW	(Saudi Arabia)	Mohammed Al-Harthi	4	0	1+3	0	0	0	0	0
17	DF	(Saudi Arabia)	Meshal Khalaf	7	0	5	0	1	0	1	0
18	MF	(Saudi Arabia)	Maan Khodari	13	0	12+1	0	0	0	0	0
20	FW	(Saudi Arabia)	Sahow Metlaq	18	2	3+14	2	0+1	0	0	0
21	GK	(Saudi Arabia)	Mansoor Al-Najai	2	0	1	0	0	0	0+1	0
22	DF	(Brazil)	William Alves	25	1	22	1	1	0	2	0
24	MF	(Saudi Arabia)	Waleed Al-Enezi	31	2	27	1	1	0	3	1
25	MF	(Saudi Arabia)	Khaled Al-Zylaeei	3	0	1+2	0	0	0	0	0
26	GK	(Saudi Arabia)	Mazyad Freeh	30	0	26	0	1	0	3	0
27	MF	(Saudi Arabia)	Abdullah Al-Jouei	10	0	9+1	0	0	0	0	0
29	MF	(Mali)	Lassana Fané*	8	0	4+3	0	0	0	1	0
31	DF	(Saudi Arabia)	Sultan Ghunaiman	29	1	24+1	1	0+1	0	3	0
44	DF	(Saudi Arabia)	Naif Mansor	1	0	0	0	0	0	0+1	0
70	FW	(Saudi Arabia)	Hassan Sharahili*	1	0	0	0	0	0	0+1	0
77	FW	(Saudi Arabia)	Faisal Ayyadah*	17	3	9+5	3	0	0	1+2	0
78	MF	(Saudi Arabia)	Mohsen Al-Eisa	6	0	0+6	0	0	0	0	0
80	FW	(Saudi Arabia)	Badr Bander	3	0	1+1	0	1	0	0	0
85	FW	(Brazil)	Tarabai	12	4	11+1	4	0	0	0	0
88	MF	(Saudi Arabia)	Riyadh Al-Ibrahim	4	0	2+2	0	0	0	0	0
90	DF	(Saudi Arabia)	Jamal Al-Dhefiri	9	0	6+2	0	0	0	1	0
92	MF	(Egypt)	Ahmed Hamoudi*	10	1	6+2	1	0	0	1+1	0
99	FW	(Brazil)	Jorge Silva	30	14	26	13	1	0	3	1

=== Goalscorers ===
Rank	No.	Pos	Nat	Name	Pro League	King Cup	Crown Prince Cup	Total
1	99	FW	(Brazil)	Jorge Silva	13	0	1	14
2	12	FW	(Brazil)	Jhonnattann Benites	7	0	0	7
3	85	FW	(Brazil)	Tarabai	4	0	0	4
4	77	FW	(Saudi Arabia)	Faisal Ayyadah	3	0	0	3
5	14	MF	(Saudi Arabia)	Khaled Dakheel	1	1	0	2
5	20	FW	(Saudi Arabia)	Sahow Metlaq	2	0	0	2
5	24	MF	(Saudi Arabia)	Waleed Al-Enezi	1	0	1	2
8	15	MF	(Saudi Arabia)	Abdulmajeed Obaid	0	1	0	1
8	22	DF	(Brazil)	William Alves	1	0	0	1
8	31	DF	(Saudi Arabia)	Sultan Ghunaiman	1	0	0	1
8	92	MF	(Egypt)	Ahmed Hamoudi	1	0	0	1
Total					34	2	2	38

Last Updated: 16 May 2017

=== Clean sheets ===
Rank	No.	Pos	Nat	Name	Pro League	King Cup	Crown Prince Cup	Total
1	26	GK	(Saudi Arabia)	Mazyad Freeh	7	0	2	9
Total					7	0	2	9

Last Updated: 16 May 2017
