= 2014–15 Saudi Pro League =

Professional League
- Season: 2014–2015
- Dates: 8 August 2014 – 18 May 2015
- Champions: Al-Nassr (8th title)
- Relegated: Al-Shoulla; Al-Orobah
- AFC Champions League: Al-Nassr; Al-Hilal; Al-Ahli; Al-Ittihad
- GCC Champions League: Al-Fateh; Al-Faisaly
- Matches: 182
- Goals: 528 (2.9 per match)
- Top goalscorer: Omar Al Somah (22 goals)
- Biggest home win: Al-Ahli 6–1 Hajer (16 August 2014); Al-Nassr 5–0 Al-Shoulla (7 March 2015); Al-Ahli 5–0 Al-Fateh (28 April 2015)
- Biggest away win: Hajer 0–4 Al-Nassr (30 November 2014); Najran 0–4 Al-Nassr (5 February 2015); Al-Faisaly 1–5 Al-Nassr (26 April 2015)
- Highest scoring: Hajer 4–4 Al-Shabab (19 February 2015); Al-Taawoun 4–4 Al-Khaleej (15 May 2015)
- Longest winning run: 8 games Al-Ahli
- Longest unbeaten run: 26 games Al-Ahli
- Longest winless run: 11 games Al-Raed
- Longest losing run: 7 games Al-Orobah
- Highest attendance: 60,134; Al-Ittihad 0–0 Al-Hilal (1 December 2014)
- Lowest attendance: 45; Najran 1–2 Hajer (18 May 2015)
- Average attendance: 9,146

The 2014–15 Saudi Professional League (known as the Abdul Latif Jameel Professional League for sponsorship reasons) was the 39th season of the Saudi Pro League, the top Saudi professional league for association football clubs, since its establishment in 1976. The season began on 8 August 2014 and ended on 18 May 2015. Al-Nassr were the defending champions having won their seventh title the prior season. The league was contested by the 12 teams from the 2013–14 season as well as Al-Khaleej and Hajer, who joined as the promoted clubs from the 2013–14 First Division. They replace Al-Ettifaq and Al-Nahda who were relegated to the 2014–15 First Division.

On 10 May, Al-Nassr secured their eighth league title and second one in a row with one game to spare after a 1–0 win against derby rivals Al-Hilal coupled with Al-Ahli's 2–2 draw with Al-Taawoun. Runners-up Al-Ahli ended the season without a single defeat becoming the third team to ever do so in a 26-game league season and the fourth team overall. They became the first team to end the season unbeaten and not be crowned champions.

Both Al-Orobah and Al-Shoulla were relegated on the final matchday on 10 May. Al-Orobah were relegated after a 1–0 home defeat to Najran. Al-Shoulla were relegated after a 2–2 draw with Al-Raed.

== Teams ==
Fourteen teams competed in the league – the twelve teams from the previous season and the two teams promoted from the First Division. The promoted teams were Hajer (returning after a season's absence) and Al-Khaleej (returning to the top flight after seven years). They replaced Al-Ettifaq (ending their thirty-seven-year top-flight spell) and Al-Nahda (who were relegated after one season in the top flight).

=== Stadiums and locations ===
Locations of teams in the 2014–15 Saudi Professional League

Note: Table lists in alphabetical order.

Team	Location	Stadium	Capacity
Al-Ahli	Jeddah	King Abdullah Sports City	62,345
Al-Faisaly	Harmah	Prince Salman Sport City Stadium	5,200
Al-Fateh	Hofuf	Prince Abdullah bin Jalawi Stadium	19,096
Al-Hilal	Riyadh	King Fahd International Stadium; Prince Faisal bin Fahd Stadium	62,685; 22,500
Al-Ittihad	Jeddah	King Abdullah Sports City	62,345
Al-Khaleej	Saihat	Prince Mohamed bin Fahd Stadium (Dammam)	21,701
Al-Nassr	Riyadh	King Fahd International Stadium; Prince Faisal bin Fahd Stadium	62,685; 22,500
Al-Orobah	Sakakah	Al-Orobah Club Stadium	6,000
Al-Raed	Buraidah	King Abdullah Sport City Stadium	23,600
Al-Shabab	Riyadh	King Fahd International Stadium; Prince Faisal bin Fahd Stadium	62,685; 22,500
Al-Shoulla	Al-Kharj	Al-Shoulla Club Stadium	8,000
Al-Taawoun	Buraidah	King Abdullah Sport City Stadium	23,600
Hajer	Al-Hasa	Prince Abdullah bin Jalawi Stadium	19,096
Najran	Najran	Al Akhdoud Club Stadium	3,200

=== Personnel and kits ===
Team	Head coach	Captain	Kit manufacturer	Shirt sponsor
Al-Ahli	(Switzerland) Christian Gross	(Saudi Arabia) Taisir Al-Jassim	Umbro	Qatar Airways
Al-Faisaly	(Portugal) Toni Conceição	(Saudi Arabia) Omar Abdulaziz	Macron	Roco^{1}
Al-Fateh	(Tunisia) Nacif Beyaoui	(Saudi Arabia) Hamdan Al-Hamdan	Lotto	Hyundai, Al Kifah^{1}, AlMoosa Hospital^{1}
Al-Hilal	(Greece) Georgios Donis	(Saudi Arabia) Salman Al-Faraj	Nike	Volkswagen, Mobily, Abdul Samad Al Qurashi^{1}, Tasnee^{1}, ExxonMobil^{2}
Al-Ittihad	(Romania) Victor Pițurcă	(Saudi Arabia) Mohammed Noor	Erreà	ExxonMobil^{2}
Al-Khaleej	(Tunisia) Jalel Kadri	(Saudi Arabia) Hussain Al-Turki	Uhlsport	Hyundai, Ghassan Property Group^{2}
Al-Nassr	(Uruguay) Jorge da Silva	(Saudi Arabia) Hussein Abdulghani	Sporta	Mobily, Ugine^{2}
Al-Orobah	(Egypt) Amro Anwar	(Kuwait) Musaed Neda	Erreà	Herfy
Al-Raed	(Tunisia) Ammar Souayah	(Saudi Arabia) Meshal Al-Enezi	Hattrick	Hana Water
Al-Shabab	(Egypt) Adel Abdel Rahman	(Saudi Arabia) Ahmed Otaif	Adidas	Al-Sanabel Wheats^{1}
Al-Shoulla	(Romania) Eusebiu Tudor	(Saudi Arabia) Burj Maodah	Hattrick	
Al-Taawoun	(Portugal) José Manuel Gomes	(Saudi Arabia) Adnan Fallatah	Erreà	Kudu, Al Saif Gallery^{1}, Al Abaqra Co.^{2}
Hajer	(Montenegro) Nebojša Jovović	(Saudi Arabia) Riyadh Al-Ibrahim	Erreà	Al-Ajmi Co., Almulhim Auto
Najran	(Algeria) Fouad Bouali	(Saudi Arabia) Hamad Al-Rubaie	Hattrick	Polystar

- ^{1} On the back of the strip.
- ^{2} On the right sleeve of the strip.

=== Managerial changes ===
Team	Outgoing manager	Manner of departure	Date of vacancy	Position in table	Incoming manager	Date of appointment
Al-Khaleej	(Saudi Arabia) Sameer Hilal	End of contract	6 April 2014	Pre-season	(Tunisia) Jalel Kadri	29 April 2014
Al-Faisaly	(Italy) Giovanni Solinas	End of contract	1 May 2014	Pre-season	(Belgium) Stéphane Demol	21 May 2014
Al-Nassr	(Uruguay) José Daniel Carreño	End of contract	1 May 2014	Pre-season	(Spain) Raúl Caneda	3 May 2014
Al-Orobah	(Tunisia) Jameel Qassem	End of contract	1 May 2014	Pre-season	(France) Laurent Banide	25 May 2014
Al-Raed	(Belgium) Marc Brys	End of contract	1 May 2014	Pre-season	(North Macedonia) Vlatko Kostov	31 May 2014
Al-Shoulla	(Spain) Juan José Maqueda	End of contract	1 May 2014	Pre-season	(Netherlands) Hans van der Pluijm	9 May 2014
Najran	(Syria) Nizar Mahrous	End of contract	1 May 2014	Pre-season	(France) Denis Lavagne	8 June 2014
Al-Ahli	(Portugal) Vítor Pereira	Resigned	5 May 2014	Pre-season	(Switzerland) Christian Gross	16 June 2014
Al-Shabab	(Tunisia) Ammar Souayah	End of contract	15 May 2014	Pre-season	(Portugal) José Morais	3 June 2014
Al-Hilal	(Saudi Arabia) Sami Al-Jaber	Sacked	26 May 2014	Pre-season	(Romania) Laurențiu Reghecampf	26 May 2014
Al-Fateh	(Tunisia) Fathi Al-Jabal	End of contract	27 May 2014	Pre-season	(Spain) Juan José Maqueda	27 May 2014
Al-Shoulla	(Netherlands) Hans van der Pluijm	Sacked	26 July 2014	Pre-season	(Romania) Eusebiu Tudor	26 July 2014
Najran	(France) Denis Lavagne	Resigned	25 August 2014	11th	(Belgium) Marc Brys	25 August 2014
Al-Ittihad	(Saudi Arabia) Khalid Al-Koroni	Sacked	28 August 2014	4th	(Egypt) Amro Anwar (caretaker)	28 August 2014
Al-Raed	(North Macedonia) Vlatko Kostov	Sacked	1 September 2014	13th	(Tunisia) Emad Al-Sulami (caretaker)	1 September 2014
Al-Taawoun	(Algeria) Taoufik Rouabah	Sacked	2 September 2014	10th	(Portugal) José Manuel Gomes	4 September 2014
Hajer	(Tunisia) Nacif Beyaoui	Resigned	20 September 2014	8th	(Saudi Arabia) Abdullah Al-Janoubi (caretaker)	20 September 2014
Najran	(Belgium) Marc Brys	Resigned	24 September 2014	11th	(Tunisia) Abdelhay Atiri (caretaker)	24 September 2014
Al-Fateh	(Spain) Juan José Maqueda	Sacked	25 September 2014	10th	(Tunisia) Nacif Beyaoui	1 October 2014
Hajer	(Saudi Arabia) Abdullah Al-Janoubi (caretaker)	End of caretaker period	27 September 2014	8th	(Montenegro) Nebojša Jovović	27 September 2014
Al-Shabab	(Portugal) José Morais	Mutual consent	6 October 2014	4th	(Germany) Reinhard Stumpf	7 October 2014
Al-Raed	(Tunisia) Emad Al-Sulami (caretaker)	End of caretaker period	7 October 2014	13th	(Belgium) Marc Brys	7 October 2014
Najran	(Tunisia) Abdelhay Atiri (caretaker)	End of caretaker period	8 October 2014	11th	(Algeria) Fouad Bouali	8 October 2014
Al-Ittihad	(Egypt) Amro Anwar (caretaker)	End of caretaker period	16 October 2014	3rd	(Romania) Victor Pițurcă	16 October 2014
Al-Nassr	(Spain) Raúl Caneda	Sacked	1 November 2014	1st	(Uruguay) Jorge da Silva	2 November 2014
Al-Orobah	(France) Laurent Banide	Mutual consent	17 December 2014	12th	(Tunisia) Sofiane Kassabi (caretaker)	17 December 2014
Al-Shabab	(Germany) Reinhard Stumpf	Sacked	21 December 2014	3rd	(Portugal) Jaime Pacheco	8 January 2015
Al-Orobah	(Tunisia) Sofiane Kassabi (caretaker)	End of caretaker period	2 January 2015	11th	(Romania) Valeriu Tița	2 January 2015
Al-Hilal	(Romania) Laurențiu Reghecampf	Sacked	15 February 2015	3rd	(Romania) Ciprian Panait (caretaker)	15 February 2015
Al-Hilal	(Romania) Ciprian Panait (caretaker)	End of caretaker period	28 February 2015	4th	(Greece) Georgios Donis	28 February 2015
Al-Faisaly	(Belgium) Stéphane Demol	Sacked	14 March 2015	6th	(Portugal) Toni Conceição	14 March 2015
Al-Raed	(Belgium) Marc Brys	Sacked	24 March 2015	11th	(Tunisia) Ammar Souayah	24 March 2015
Al-Shabab	(Portugal) Jaime Pacheco	Sacked	27 March 2015	5th	(Egypt) Adel Abdel Rahman	28 March 2015
Al-Orobah	(Romania) Valeriu Tița	Sacked	7 April 2015	13th	(Egypt) Amro Anwar	7 April 2015

=== Foreign players ===
The number of foreign players is restricted to four per team, including a slot for a player from AFC countries.

Players name in bold indicates the player is registered during the mid-season transfer window.

Club	Player 1	Player 2	Player 3	AFC player	Former players
Al-Ahli	(Brazil) **Bruno César**	(Brazil) **Osvaldo**	(Egypt) **Mohamed Abdel Shafy**	(Ba'athist Syria) Omar Al Somah	(Colombia) Jairo Palomino (Morocco) Moestafa El Kabir (Nigeria) Isaac Promise (Spain) Dani Quintana
Al-Faisaly	(Cameroon) **André Ndame Ndame**	(Jordan) Khalil Bani Attiah	(Senegal) **Macoumba Kandji**	(Palestine) Ashraf Nu'man	(Brazil) Adriano Pardal (Brazil) Marcelo Nicácio
Al-Fateh	(Brazil) **Elias**	(Brazil) Élton Arábia	(Democratic Republic of the Congo) Doris Fuakumputu	(Bahrain) **Hussain Ali Baba**	(Ghana) Abraham Kumedor (Ba'athist Syria) Ahmad Deeb
Al-Hilal	(Brazil) Digão	(Brazil) Thiago Neves	(Greece) **Georgios Samaras**	(South Korea) Kwak Tae-hwi	(Romania) Mihai Pintilii
Al-Ittihad	(Brazil) Marquinho	(Poland) **Łukasz Szukała**	(Romania) **Lucian Sânmărtean**	(Iraq) **Saif Salman**	(Ivory Coast) Didier Ya Konan (Jordan) Mohammad Al-Dmeiri (Mali) Samba Diakité
Al-Khaleej	(Cameroon) **Aminou Bouba**	(Ivory Coast) Habib Meité	(Jordan) Hamza Al-Dardour	(Jordan) Ibrahim Al-Zawahreh	(Jordan) Shareef Adnan
Al-Nassr	(Ecuador) **Armando Wila**	(Poland) Adrian Mierzejewski	(Uruguay) **Fabián Estoyanoff**	(Bahrain) Mohamed Husain	(Brazil) Hernane (Brazil) Marquinhos Gabriel
Al-Orobah	(Burkina Faso) **Moussa Yedan**	(Ghana) **Issac Osae**	(Ghana) Moussa Narry	(Kuwait) Musaed Neda	(Bolivia) Jhasmani Campos (Ghana) Emmanuel Banahene (Lebanon) Khodr Salame
Al-Raed	(Cameroon) Alexis Enam	(Iraq) **Amjad Radhi**	(Morocco) Hassan Taïr	(Jordan) Anas Bani Yaseen	(Senegal) Papa Waigo
Al-Shabab	(Brazil) Rafinha	(Ghana) **John Antwi**	(Ghana) **Mohamed Awal**	(Jordan) **Tareq Khattab**	(Brazil) Rogerinho (Senegal) Mbaye Diagne (South Korea) Park Chu-young
Al-Shoulla	(Ghana) **Sadat Bukari**	(Mali) **Lassana Fané**	(Montenegro) **Bojan Božović**	(Brazil) **Orestes** ^{1}	(Brazil) Andrezinho (Ghana) Ahmed Adams (Ghana) Samuel Owusu (Jordan) Yaseen Al-Bakhit
Al-Taawoun	(Cameroon) Paul Alo'o	(Jordan) Shadi Abu Hash'hash	(Kenya) David Ochieng	(Ba'athist Syria) Jehad Al-Hussain	
Hajer	(Brazil) **Jildemar**	(Croatia) **Dario Jertec**	(Montenegro) Đorđe Đikanović	(Jordan) Alaa' Al-Shaqran	(Brazil) Aloísio (Guinea) Naby Soumah (Senegal) Mansour Gueye
Najran	(Algeria) Farid Cheklam	(Brazil) Jandson	(Ghana) **Winful Cobbinah**	(Jordan) **Mussab Al-Laham**	(Burkina Faso) Michaïlou Dramé (Nigeria) Obinna Obiefule

- **^1** Orestes has East Timorese passport and was counted as Asian player.

== League table ==
Pos	Team	Pld	W	D	L	GF	GA	GD	Pts	Qualification or relegation
1	Al-Nassr (C)	26	20	4	2	62	20	+42	64	Qualification for the AFC Champions League group stage
2	Al-Ahli	26	17	9	0	59	22	+37	60	Qualification for the AFC Champions League group stage
3	Al-Hilal	26	16	6	4	46	17	+29	54	Qualification for the AFC Champions League group stage
4	Al-Ittihad	26	16	4	6	44	33	+11	52	Qualification for the AFC Champions League play-off round (Note: As winners of the 2015 King Cup, Al-Hilal, qualified for AFC Champions League group stage thus the spot for the third-placed team (AFC Champions League play-off round) is passed down to the fourth-placed team.)
5	Al-Shabab	26	11	7	8	37	31	+6	40	
6	Al-Fateh	26	9	6	11	35	43	−8	33	Qualification for the GCC Champions League
7	Al-Faisaly	26	8	6	12	31	42	−11	30	Qualification for the GCC Champions League
8	Al-Khaleej	26	7	8	11	35	41	−6	29	
9	Al-Taawoun	26	7	7	12	42	46	−4	28 (Note: Al-Taawoun finished ahead of Hajer on overall goal difference: Al-Tawoun –4, Hajer –27 (Hajer 2–0 Al-Taawoun, Al-Taawoun 3–1 Hajer).)	
10	Hajer	26	8	4	14	29	56	−27	28	
11	Al-Raed	26	7	5	14	33	45	−12	26	
12	Najran	26	7	3	16	28	41	−13	24	
13	Al-Shoulla (R)	26	5	6	15	26	48	−22	21	Relegation to the First Division
14	Al-Orobah (R)	26	4	5	17	21	43	−22	17	Relegation to the First Division

Updated to match(es) played on 18 May 2015. Source: SLstat
Rules for classification: 1) Points; 2) Head-to-head points; 3) Head-to-head goal difference; 4) Total goal difference; 5) Total goals scored; 6) Fair-play points (Note: Head-to-head record is used only after all the matches between the teams in question have been played).
(C) Champions; (R) Relegated

== Results ==
Home \ Away	AHL	FSY	FAT	HIL	ITT	KHJ	NSR	ORO	RAE	SHB	SHO	TWN	HJR	NAJ
Al-Ahli		1–1	5–0	1–1	1–1	2–1	2–1	2–0	1–0	0–0	3–0	2–2	6–1	2–1
Al-Faisaly	1–4		4–2	2–2	0–3	1–2	1–5	2–0	1–0	1–3	0–0	2–2	2–0	0–1
Al-Fateh	0–1	1–2		1–2	2–2	2–0	1–1	1–0	3–2	0–2	0–0	2–0	3–1	2–1
Al-Hilal	0–0	3–0	3–0		3–0	3–0	0–1	4–1	3–1	0–1	2–1	3–1	5–1	2–1
Al-Ittihad	1–1	2–1	1–0	0–0		2–1	1–3	2–1	3–1	0–1	3–2	4–3	0–1	2–1
Al-Khaleej	1–1	4–2	2–2	0–1	0–1		0–1	2–0	3–0	1–0	1–1	0–3	2–2	0–1
Al-Nassr	3–4	0–0	4–2	1–0	2–1	4–1		2–1	2–2	0–0	5–0	2–1	3–0	4–1
Al-Orobah	1–3	1–1	1–2	1–0	0–1	2–2	0–2		2–1	0–0	2–0	4–3	2–3	0–1
Al-Raed	2–4	2–1	2–3	1–1	0–1	1–2	1–2	2–1		3–1	1–0	0–0	2–1	3–2
Al-Shabab	2–3	2–1	2–2	0–1	3–4	2–0	0–3	3–0	0–0		2–1	1–2	2–0	2–1
Al-Shoulla	0–2	2–1	1–0	1–3	1–3	1–1	1–2	0–0	2–2	1–2		4–3	3–1	2–1
Al-Taawoun	1–4	0–1	1–2	0–1	4–3	4–4	0–1	1–1	3–1	1–1	3–0		3–1	0–0
Hajer	0–3	0–2	2–1	1–1	0–1	1–1	0–4	1–0	2–1	4–4	2–1	2–0		0–3
Najran	1–1	0–1	1–1	0–2	1–2	1–4	0–4	2–0	1–2	2–1	3–1	0–1	1–2	

Updated to match(es) played on 18 May 2015. Source: SLstat.com
Legend: Blue = home team win; Yellow = draw; Red = away team win.
For upcoming matches, an "a" indicates there is an article about the rivalry between the two participants.

=== Season progress ===
Team ╲ Round	1	2	3	4	5	6	7	8	9	10	11	12	13	14	15	16	17	18	19	20	21	22	23	24	25	26
Al-Ahli	W	D	D	W	D	W	W	W	W	D	W	W	D	W	D	D	W	W	W	W	W	W	W	W	D	D
Al-Faisaly	L	W	W	W	D	D	W	L	D	D	L	D	D	L	L	W	W	W	W	L	L	L	L	L	L	L
Al-Fateh	L	L	L	L	W	L	W	L	D	W	L	L	W	D	D	L	D	W	L	W	D	W	D	L	W	W
Al-Hilal	W	W	D	W	W	W	L	D	W	W	L	D	D	W	L	D	W	W	W	W	W	W	W	D	L	W
Al-Ittihad	W	W	W	W	W	W	W	L	L	D	L	L	D	D	W	W	W	W	W	W	L	W	L	W	W	D
Al-Khaleej	L	D	L	L	L	D	L	D	D	W	L	W	L	W	D	L	D	L	D	L	W	L	W	W	W	D
Al-Nassr	W	W	W	W	W	W	L	W	W	W	D	W	W	W	D	W	D	W	W	L	W	W	W	W	W	D
Al-Orobah	L	W	W	L	D	L	L	D	L	D	D	L	L	D	W	L	L	L	L	L	L	L	W	L	L	L
Al-Raed	L	L	L	D	L	L	L	L	D	L	L	W	W	W	D	W	L	W	L	L	L	W	L	D	D	W
Al-Shabab	W	W	W	W	D	W	W	W	D	L	D	W	L	L	D	D	W	L	L	L	W	L	D	W	L	D
Al-Shoulla	L	D	L	L	L	L	L	W	L	D	W	L	D	L	D	L	L	L	L	W	D	W	L	L	D	W
Al-Taawoun	L	L	D	D	L	D	W	L	W	W	L	L	W	D	W	W	W	L	L	L	L	L	D	L	D	D
Hajer	L	W	L	L	W	D	W	L	W	L	L	W	D	L	L	D	L	L	D	W	W	L	L	W	L	L
Najran	L	D	D	L	L	L	L	W	W	L	W	W	L	L	L	L	L	L	W	W	L	L	D	L	W	L

Source: ALJ Stats
W = Win; D = Draw; L = Lose

== Season statistics ==
=== Scoring ===
==== Top scorers ====
Rank	Player	Club	Goals
1	(Ba'athist Syria) Omar Al Somah	Al-Ahli	22
2	(Saudi Arabia) Mohammad Al-Sahlawi	Al-Nassr	21
3	(Cameroon) Paul Alo'o	Al-Taawoun	15
4	(Saudi Arabia) Naif Hazazi	Al-Shabab	14
5	(Brazil) Jandson	Najran	13
5	(Saudi Arabia) Nasser Al-Shamrani	Al-Hilal	13
7	(Brazil) Élton Arábia	Al-Fateh	10
7	(Brazil) Thiago Neves	Al-Hilal	10
7	(Democratic Republic of the Congo) Doris Fuakumputu	Al-Fateh	10
7	(Morocco) Hassan Taïr	Al-Raed	10

==== Hat-tricks ====
Player	For	Against	Result	Date	Ref
(Ba'athist Syria) Omar Al Somah	Al-Ahli	Hajer	6–1 (H)	16 August 2014	
(Cameroon) Paul Alo'o	Al-Taawoun	Al-Ittihad	4–3 (H)	5 December 2014	
(Brazil) Marquinho	Al-Ittihad	Al-Taawoun	3–4 (A)	5 December 2014	
(Saudi Arabia) Abdulrahman Al-Ghamdi	Al-Ittihad	Al-Faisaly	3–0 (A)	12 February 2015	
(Saudi Arabia) Mukhtar Fallatah	Al-Ittihad	Al-Raed	3–1 (H)	15 March 2015	
(Ba'athist Syria) Omar Al Somah	Al-Ahli	Al-Nassr	4–3 (A)	22 March 2015	

=== Clean sheets ===
Rank	Player	Club	Clean sheets
1	(Saudi Arabia) Abdullah Al-Enezi	Al-Nassr	10
2	(Saudi Arabia) Abdullah Al-Mayouf	Al-Ahli	9
3	(Saudi Arabia) Waleed Abdullah	Al-Shabab	8
4	(Saudi Arabia) Khalid Sharahili	Al-Hilal	7
5	(Saudi Arabia) Basem Atallah	Al-Taawoun	5
5	(Saudi Arabia) Ibrahim Zaid	Al-Faisaly	5
7	(Saudi Arabia) Hani Al-Nahedh	Al-Ittihad	4
7	(Saudi Arabia) Mansoor Al-Najai	Al-Faisaly	4

=== Discipline ===
==== Player ====
- Most yellow cards: 10
  - (Saudi Arabia) Adnan Fallatah (Al-Taawoun)
- Most red cards: 2
  - (Bahrain) Mohamed Husain (Al-Nassr)
  - (Saudi Arabia) Khalid Al-Ghamdi (Al-Nassr)
  - (Saudi Arabia) Sultan Al-Yami (Al-Orobah)

==== Club ====
- Most yellow cards: 63
  - Najran
- Most red cards: 7
  - Al-Shabab

== Attendances ==
=== By round ===
2014–15 Saudi Pro League Attendance
Round	Total	Games	Avg. Per Game
Round 1	139,173	7	19,882
Round 2	34,802	7	4,972
Round 3	31,136	7	4,448
Round 4	86,586	7	12,369
Round 5	43,471	7	6,210
Round 6	29,017	7	4,151
Round 7	115,246	7	16,464
Round 8	27,127	7	3,875
Round 9	86,696	7	12,385
Round 10	78,823	7	11,260
Round 11	31,342	7	4,477
Round 12	63,776	7	9,111
Round 13	85,384	7	12,198
Round 14	23,436	7	3,348
Round 15	50,236	7	7,177
Round 16	122,641	7	17,520
Round 17	26,215	7	3,745
Round 18	71,086	7	10,155
Round 19	69,109	7	9,873
Round 20	52,536	7	7,505
Round 21	115,986	7	16,569
Round 22	23,998	7	3,428
Round 23	59,097	7	8,442
Round 24	47,950	7	6,850
Round 25	43,619	7	6,231
Round 26	105,164	7	17,527
Total	1,664,652	182	9,146

=== By team ===
Pos	Team	Total	High	Low	Average	Change
1	Al-Ittihad	550,822	60,134	11,499	42,371	+457.8%
2	Al-Ahli	443,161	60,010	12,938	34,089	+328.3%
3	Al-Nassr	210,416	59,174	5,120	16,186	−3.2%
4	Al-Hilal	169,086	40,730	2,677	13,007	+3.1%
5	Al-Orobah	47,539	6,735	173	3,657	+30.5%
6	Al-Raed	43,046	10,120	489	3,311	+85.6%
7	Al-Shabab	42,767	18,250	483	3,290	−8.3%
8	Al-Fateh	36,096	10,560	273	2,777	+23.9%
9	Al-Taawoun	34,908	6,752	335	2,685	−54.7%
10	Al-Khaleej	34,901	9,223	155	2,685	n/a^{†}
11	Hajer	21,082	4,300	160	1,622	n/a^{†}
12	Najran	12,331	2,983	45	949	−2.8%
13	Al-Shoulla	11,087	3,864	78	853	−13.8%
14	Al-Faisaly	7,410	2,229	53	570	−21.1%
	League total	1,664,652	60,134	45	9,146	+86.3%

Updated to games played on 18 May 2015
Notes:
^{†} Teams played previous season in First Division.

== Awards ==
On 5 August 2014, the SAFF announced a new set of awards that included six categories. The winners were announced on 14 June 2015.

- Player of the Year: (Saudi Arabia) Mohammad Al-Sahlawi (Al-Nassr)
- Young Player of the Year: (Saudi Arabia) Abdulfattah Asiri (Al-Ittihad)
- Goalkeeper of the Year: (Saudi Arabia) Abdullah Al-Enezi (Al-Nassr)
- Manager of the Year: (Switzerland) Christian Gross (Al-Ahli)
- Top Scorer: (Syria) Omar Al Somah (Al-Ahli)
- Perfect Team: Al-Ahli

=== Team of the Season ===
Team of the Season
Goalkeeper	(Saudi Arabia) Waleed Abdullah (Al-Shabab)			
Defenders	(Brazil) Digaô (Al-Hilal)	(Saudi Arabia) Hassan Muath (Al-Shabab)	(Saudi Arabia) Osama Hawsawi (Al-Ahli)	(Saudi Arabia) Hussein Abdulghani (Al-Nassr)
Midfielders	(Poland) Adrian Mierzejewski (Al-Nassr)	(Saudi Arabia) Ahmed Atef (Al-Shabab)	(Brazil) Elton Arábia (Al-Fateh)	(Brazil) Thiago Neves (Al-Hilal)
Forwards	(Saudi Arabia) Mohammed Al-Sahlawi (Al-Nassr)		(Syria) Omar Al-Somah (Al-Ahli)	

== See also ==
- 2014–15 Saudi First Division
- 2015 King Cup
- 2014–15 Crown Prince Cup
- 2015 Super Cup
