= Saeed Al-Issa =

Saudi Arabian footballer

Personal information
- Full name: Saeed Al-Issa
- Date of birth: September 15, 1988 (age 38)
- Place of birth: Saudi Arabia
- Height: 1.72 m (5 ft 7 1/2 in)
- Position: Left-back

Team information
- Current team: Al-Sadd
- Number: 21

Youth career
- Sdoos

Senior career*
Years	Team	Apps	(Gls)
2008–2011	Al-Shabab	1	(0)
2011–2015	Al-Raed FC	39	(0)
2015–2016	Al-Shoalah		
2017–2018	Al-Diriyah		
2018–	Al-Sadd		
- * Club domestic league appearances and goals

Saeed Al-Issa is a Saudi Arabian football player who currently plays as a left-back for Al-Sadd.
