= Mishel =

Mishel is a surname and given name, related to the names Michel and Michelle.

Notable people with the surname include:

- Dave Mishel (1905–1975), American football player
- Lawrence Mishel, American economist

Notable people with the given name include:

- Mishel Al-Agmi (born 1992), Saudi Arabian footballer
- Mishel Bilibashi (born 1989), Albanian footballer
- Mishel Nesterova (born 2009), Uzbek rhythmic gymnast
- Mishel Prada (born 1989), American actress
