= Majed Al-Mohammed =

Saudi footballer

Personal information
- Full name: Majed Ali Al-Mohammed
- Date of birth: July 4, 1986 (age 40)
- Place of birth: Saudi Arabia
- Height: 1.67 m (5 ft 5 1/2 in)
- Position: Right back

Senior career*
Years	Team	Apps	(Gls)
2007–2011	Al-Hamadah		
2011–2013	Najran	28	(1)
2013–2017	Al-Shoalah		
2017–2020	Sdoos		
- * Club domestic league appearances and goals

Majed Al-Mohammed (born 4 July 1986) is a Saudi football player.
