= Maan Al-Khodari =

Saudi Arabian footballer

Personal information
- Full name: Maan Sultan Al-Khodari
- Date of birth: 13 December 1991 (age 34)
- Place of birth: Jeddah, Saudi Arabia
- Height: 1.75 m (5 ft 9 in)
- Position: Midfielder

Youth career
- Al-Ittihad

Senior career*
Years	Team	Apps	(Gls)
2011–2015	Al-Ittihad	17	(0)
2015	→ Al-Raed (loan)	2	(0)
2015–2017	Najran	12	(0)
2017–2018	Al-Batin	26	(0)
2018–2019	Al-Shoalah	9	(0)
2021–2022	Al-Suqoor		
2022–2023	Muhayil		

International career^{‡}
2010–2011	Saudi Arabia U20	4	(0)
2011–2014	Saudi Arabia U23	2	(0)
2017–	Saudi Arabia	1	(0)
- * Club domestic league appearances and goals as of 15 April 2018 ‡ National team caps and goals as of 15 January 2018

Maan Sultan Al-Khodari (Arabic: معن سلطان الخضري, born 13 December 1991) is a Saudi professional footballer who plays as a defensive midfielder. On 4 August, his first game in 2012–13 season, he got injured at a cruciate ligament. That kept him away for 4 months.

== Career statistics ==
=== Club ===
As of 12 April 2018.

Club	Season	League		King Cup		Crown Prince Cup		Asia		Total	
Club	Season	Apps	Goals	Apps	Goals	Apps	Goals	Apps	Goals	Apps	Goals
Al-Ittihad
Al-Ittihad	2011–12	8	0	2	0	0	0	4	0	14	0
Al-Ittihad	2012–13	1	0	0	0	0	0	—		1	0
Al-Ittihad	2013–14	7	0	2	0	1	0	4	0	14	0
Al-Ittihad	2014–15	1	0	0	0	0	0	—		1	0
Total		17	0	4	0	1	0	8	0	30	0
Al-Raed (loan)	2014–15	2	0	1	0	0	0	—		3	0
Al-Raed (loan)	Total	2	0	1	0	0	0	0	0	3	0
Najran (loan)	2015–16	12	0	0	0	1	0	—		13	0
Najran (loan)	Total	12	0	0	0	1	0	0	0	13	0
Al-Batin	2016–17	13	0	0	0	0	0	—		13	0
Al-Batin	2017–18	13	0	1	0	0	0	—		14	0
Al-Batin	Total	26	0	1	0	0	0	0	0	27	0
Career Total		57	0	6	0	2	0	8	0	73	0

== Honours ==
=== National team career statistics ===
- 2011 FIFA U-20 World Cup: Round of 16
