= Tamim Al-Dawsari =

Saudi Arabian footballer

Tamim Al-Dawsari تميم الدوسري
Personal information
- Full name: Tamim Dhawai Al-Dawsari
- Date of birth: 4 June 1989 (age 37)
- Place of birth: Saudi Arabia
- Height: 1.68 m (5 ft 6 in)
- Position: Winger

Team information
- Current team: Al-Sadd
- Number: 10

Youth career
- –2008: Al-Nassr

Senior career*
Years	Team	Apps	(Gls)
2008	Al-Qala		
2010–2014	Al-Shabab	18	(1)
2014	→ Al-Shoulla (loan)	4	(0)
2014–2015	Al-Shoulla	16	(0)
2015–2016	Al-Raed	0	(0)
2016–2020	Al-Kawkab		
2020–2021	Al-Nahda	22	(1)
2021–2022	Al-Diriyah	21	(2)
2022–2023	Al-Sharq		
2023–2024	Al-Lewaa		
2024	Al-Shoulla		
2024–2025	Al-Sharq		
2025	Tuwaiq		
2025–	Al-Sadd		

International career
2011–2012	Saudi Arabia U23		
- * Club domestic league appearances and goals as of 10 May 2020

Tamim Al-Dawsari (Arabic: تميم الدوسري, born 4 June 1989) is a Saudi Arabian professional footballer who plays as a winger for Al-Sadd.

== Career ==
Al-Dawsari began his career at the youth team of Al-Nassr. Al-Dawsari joined with Al-Qala in 2008 To participate in the playoffs Saudi Third Division . and joined with Al-Shabab in 2010 On 14 January 2014, Al-Dawsari joined side Al-Shoulla on loan for the 2013–14 season. On 25 August 2014, Al-Dawsari left Al-Shabab and signed a one-year contract with Al-Shoulla . On 16 January 2015, Al-Dawsari left Al-Shoulla and signed a two-year contract with Al-Raed. On 16 October 2016, Al-Dawsari signed contract with Al-Kawkab. On 9 August 2022, Al-Dawsari joined Al-Sharq. On 14 August 2023, Al-Dawsari joined Al-Lewaa. On 26 January 2024, Al-Dawsari rejoined Al-Shoulla. On 15 August 2024, Al-Dawsari joined Al-Sharq. On 5 January 2025, Al-Dawsari joined Tuwaiq. On 3 October 2025, Al-Dawsari joined Al-Sadd.
