= Misfer Al-Bishi =

Saudi Arabian footballer

Personal information
- Full name: Misfer Al-Bishi
- Date of birth: May 31, 1988 (age 38)
- Place of birth: Saudi Arabia
- Height: 1.87 m (6 ft 2 in)
- Position: Midfielder

Youth career
- Al-Shabab

Senior career*
Years	Team	Apps	(Gls)
2007–2009	Al-Hazem		
2009	Al-Taawoun	8	(1)
2009–2020	Al-Shoulla	236	(43)
2020–2021	Al-Arabi		
2021	Al-Kawkab		
2021–2022	Al-Sadd		
2022–2023	Al-Anwar		
- * Club domestic league appearances and goals as of 20 September 2020

Misfer Al-Bishi is a Saudi Arabian footballer. He currently plays as a midfielder.
