= Fahad Al-Munaif =

Fahad Al-Munaif may refer to:

- Fahad Al-Munaif (footballer, born 1989), Saudi footballer
- Fahad Al-Munaif (footballer, born 1994), Saudi footballer
