= Saeed Al-Harbi =

Saudi Arabian footballer

Personal information
- Full name: Saeed Marzouq Al-Harbi
- Date of birth: August 28, 1981 (age 45)
- Place of birth: Saudi Arabia
- Height: 1.83 m (6 ft 0 in)
- Position: Goalkeeper

Senior career*
Years	Team	Apps	(Gls)
2000–2009	Al-Shabab		
2008–2009	→ Al-Hazem (loan)	22	(0)
2009–2012	Al-Hazem	45	(0)
2012–2020	Al-Shoulla	151	(0)
2020–2021	Bisha		
2021–2023	Al-Zulfi		

International career
2002–2005	Saudi Arabia	3	(0)
- * Club domestic league appearances and goals as of 20 September 2020

Saeed Al-Harbi is a Saudi Arabian football player who plays as a goalkeeper.

== Career statistics ==
=== Club ===
As of match played 16 May 2019

Club	Season	League		King Cup		Crown Prince Cup		Asia		Other		Total	
Club	Season	Apps	Goals	Apps	Goals	Apps	Goals	Apps	Goals	Apps	Goals	Apps	Goals
Al-Shoulla	2012–13	8	0	—		0	0	—		—		8	0
Al-Shoulla	2013–14	16	0	0	0	0	0	—		—		16	0
Al-Shoulla	2014–15	7	0	0	0	2	0	—		—		9	0
Al-Shoulla	2015–16	29	0	1	0	2	0	—		—		32	0
Al-Shoulla	2016–17	23	0	1	0	1	0	—		—		25	0
Al-Shoulla	2017–18	22	0	0	0	—		—		—		22	0
Al-Shoulla	2018–19	26	0	0	0	—		—		—		26	0
Al-Shoulla	Al-Shoulla Total	131	0	2	0	5	0	0	0	0	0	138	0
