= Abdul-Mohsen Al-Yahya =

Saudi businessman (born 1958)

- Born: 1958 (age 67–68)
- Education: King Saud University
- Occupations: Chief executive officer and board member at Kudu.
- Known for: Kudu.

Abdul-Mohsen Al-Yahya (1958) is a Saudi businessman, best known for founding fast food restaurant chain Kudu. Al Yahya built Kudu into a vertically integrated consumer food service company with a presence in the QSR, fast casual, casual dining and coffee shop/café segments across Saudi Arabia via a portfolio of five brands and over 290 outlets.

== Background and career ==
Abdulmohsen Al-Yahya has over 35 years of operational and management experience. He started his career as a project engineer in the military in 1982, and was later seconded to AlSaif Contracting as an engineer. In 1988 he established the Kudu Restaurant and is now CEO of the organization. In 2006 he was appointed a board member of Al-Khaleej Training and Education Company. In 2015 he was appointed a board member of Saudi Airlines. He received a bachelor's degree in civil engineering from King Saud University, Riyadh in 1981.
