= Meshal Al-Mutairi (footballer, born 1984) =

Saudi Arabian footballer

Meshaal Al-Mutairi
Personal information
- Full name: Meshaal Al-Mutairi
- Date of birth: 6 April 1984 (age 42)
- Place of birth: Saudi Arabia
- Position: Defender

Youth career
- ???–2007: Al Nassr FC

Senior career*
Years	Team	Apps	(Gls)
2007–2009	Al Nassr FC	?	(?)
2009–2010	Al-Faisaly	?	(?)
2010–2012	Al-Riyadh	2	(0)
2012–2013	Al-Shoalah		
- * Club domestic league appearances and goals

Meshaal Al-Mutairi (born 6 April 1984) is a Saudi Arabian football player.
