= Rashed Al-Dwesan =

Saudi Arabian footballer

Personal information
- Full name: Rashed Abdulrahman Al-Dwesan
- Date of birth: August 11, 1990 (age 36)
- Place of birth: Saudi Arabia
- Height: 1.80 m (5 ft 11 in)
- Position: Defender

Team information
- Current team: Al-Sadd
- Number: 4

Senior career*
Years	Team	Apps	(Gls)
2010–2018	Al-Shoulla	161	(4)
2018–2019	Al-Riyadh		
2019–2020	Al-Shoulla	18	(0)
2020–2021	Al-Arabi		
2021–2022	Al-Sharq		
2022–2025	Al-Selmiyah		
2025	Al-Shoulla		
2025–	Al-Sadd		
- * Club domestic league appearances and goals

Rashed Al-Dwesan is a Saudi Arabian football player who currently plays as a defender for Al-Sadd.

== Career ==
On 30 July 2025, Al-Dwesan joined Al-Shoulla. On 3 October 2025, Al-Dwesan joined Al-Sadd.
