= Khaled Awaji =

Saudi Arabian footballer

Khaled Awaji خالد عواجي
Personal information
- Full name: Khaled Mohammed Awaji
- Date of birth: 19 June 1990 (age 36)
- Place of birth: Saudi Arabia
- Height: 1.75 m (5 ft 9 in)
- Position: Defender

Youth career
- –2006: Hetten
- 2006–2011: Al-Shabab

Senior career*
Years	Team	Apps	(Gls)
2011–2013	Al-Shabab		
2013	→ Hetten (loan)		
2013–2014	Abha		
2014–2016	Hetten		
2016–2017	Al-Muzahimiyyah		
2017–2019	Al-Bateen		
2019–2022	Sdoos		
- * Club domestic league appearances and goals as of 30 July 2020

Khaled Awaji (Arabic: خالد عواجي; born 19 June 1990) is a Saudi Arabian footballer who plays as a defender.

== Career ==
He formerly played for Hetten, Al-Shabab, again Hetten, Abha, again Hetten, Al-Muzahimiyyah, Al-Bateen, and Sdoos.
