= Jaber Hagawi =

Saudi Arabian footballer

Personal information
- Full name: Jaber Hagawi
- Date of birth: August 13, 1981 (age 45)
- Place of birth: Saudi Arabia
- Height: 1.77 m (5 ft 10 in)
- Position: Defender

Senior career*
Years	Team	Apps	(Gls)
2004–2010	Al-Qadisiyah	?	(?)
2010–2012	Al-Fateh	45	(0)
2012–2013	Al-Shoalah	1	(0)
2013–2015	Al-Jubail		
2015–2016	Al-Safa		
2016–2017	Al-Noor		

International career^{‡}
2003–2004	Saudi Arabia	2	(0)
- * Club domestic league appearances and goals as of 3 February 2013 ‡ National team caps and goals as of 3 February 2013

Jaber Hagawi is a Saudi Arabian football player.
