= Ahmed Hebh =

Saudi Arabian footballer (born 1985)

Personal information
- Full name: Ahmed Hebh
- Date of birth: February 25, 1985 (age 41)
- Place of birth: Saudi Arabia
- Height: 1.85 m (6 ft 1 in)
- Position: Midfielder

Senior career*
Years	Team	Apps	(Gls)
???–2013	Al-Shoalah	9	(3)
2013–2015	Al-Mujazzel		
2015–2016	Sdoos		
2016–2018	Al-Diriyah		
- * Club domestic league appearances and goals

Ahmed Hebh is a Saudi football player who currently plays as a midfielder.
