= Sultan Al-Yami =

Saudi Arabian footballer

Personal information
- Full name: Sultan Al-Yami
- Date of birth: June 2, 1987 (age 39)
- Place of birth: Najran, Saudi Arabia
- Height: 1.76 m (5 ft 9 in)
- Position: Right back

Team information
- Current team: Al-Hedaya
- Number: 24

Senior career*
| Years | Team | Apps | (Gls) |
| 2008–2011 | Al-Qadisiyah | 30 | (1) |
| 2011–2013 | Al-Taawoun | 42 | (1) |
| 2013–2014 | Al-Faisaly | 13 | (0) |
| 2014 | Al-Orobah | 2 | (0) |
| 2014–2015 | Al-Shoalah | 15 | (0) |
| 2015–2017 | Al-Raed | 19 | (1) |
| 2017–2018 | Al-Nahda | | |
| 2019–2020 | Najran | 19 | (0) |
| 2020–2021 | Al-Thoqbah | | |
| 2021–2023 | Al-Jubail | | |
| 2024– | Al-Hedaya | | |
- * Club domestic league appearances and goals

Sultan Al-Yami (Arabic: سلطان اليامي; born 2 June 1987) is a Saudi football player who plays for Al-Hedaya as a right back.
