= Faisal Al-Merqeb =

Saudi Arabian footballer

Personal information
- Full name: Faisal Al-Merqeb
- Date of birth: April 11, 1981 (age 45)
- Place of birth: Saudi Arabia
- Height: 1.77 m (5 ft 10 in)
- Position: Goalkeeper

Youth career
- ???–2001: Sdoos

Senior career*
| Years | Team | Apps | (Gls) |
| 2004–2009 | Sdoos | 0 | (0) |
| 2004–2009 | Ittihad FC | | |
| 2007–2009 | → Al-Watani (loan) | | |
| 2009–2011 | Al Wehda | 16 | (0) |
| 2011–2012 | Al-Riyadh SC | | |
| 2012–2016 | Al-Taawon FC | 13 | (0) |
| 2016–2019 | Al-Nahda | | |
| 2019–2020 | Al-Diriyah | | |
| 2020–2021 | Al-Arabi | | |
- * Club domestic league appearances and goals

Faisal Al-Merqeb (Arabic: فيصل المرقب) (born 1981) is a Saudi Arabian footballer who currently plays as a goalkeeper.
