= Philip Boampong =

Ghanaian footballer

Personal information
- Full name: Philip Boampong
- Date of birth: January 1, 1990 (age 36)
- Place of birth: Ghana
- Height: 1.78 m (5 ft 10 in)
- Position: Defender

Youth career
- Maxbees FC

Senior career*
Years	Team	Apps	(Gls)
2005–2008	Maxbees FC	?	(?)
2008–2009	Wa All Stars	?	(?)
2009–2010	Berekum Arsenal	?	(?)
2010– 2015/2016	Hearts of Oak	?	(?)
2012–2013	→ Al-Shoalah (loan)	8	(0)

International career^{‡}
2007	Ghana U-17	6	(0)
2009	Ghana U-20	0	(0)
- * Club domestic league appearances and goals as of 28 August 2013 ‡ National team caps and goals as of 28 August 2013

Philip Boampong (born 1 January 1990 in Ghana) is a Ghanaian footballer. He currently plays for the Ghana Telecom Premier League side Hearts of Oak.

== Career ==
Boampong moved with teammate Abdul Naza Alhassan from Maxbees FC to Wa All Stars in 2008. After one year with the Wa based club joined to Berekum Arsenal in January 2009. In August 2011, a fee was agreed with Turkish side Bucaspor and Hearts, but the deal soon fell through. On 1 July 2012, Boampong joined Saudi Arabian side Al-Shoalah on a season-long loan.

== International career ==
Boampong played for U-17 Ghana national team in 2007 FIFA U-17 World Cup in Korea Republic, he played by the turnier 6 games and holds 4 yellow cards. On 19 August 2008 was first called for the Satellites, and was part of the Ghana national under-20 football team that won the 2009 FIFA U-20 World Cup in Egypt. Although he never played a single game for the Satellites.

== Personal life ==
He is the younger brother of former Black Stars defender Dan Coleman.

== Titles and honours ==
=== International ===
Ghana U-20

- FIFA U-20 World Cup Champion: 2009
