= Ahmed Dalah =

Saudi Arabian football player

Personal information
- Full name: Ahmed Dalah
- Date of birth: April 23, 1987 (age 39)
- Place of birth: Saudi Arabia
- Height: 1.74 m (5 ft 8 1/2 in)
- Position: Defender

Youth career
- Wej SC

Senior career*
| Years | Team | Apps | (Gls) |
| 2007–2009 | Ittihad FC | | |
| 2009–2012 | Al-Faisaly | | |
| 2012–2013 | Al-Shoalah | | |
- * Club domestic league appearances and goals

Ahmed Dalah is a Saudi Arabian football player.
