= Turky Al-Thagafi =

Saudi Arabian footballer

Personal information
- Full name: Turky Mousa Al-Thagafi
- Date of birth: May 1, 1986 (age 40)
- Place of birth: Saudi Arabia
- Height: 1.70 m (5 ft 7 in)
- Position: Midfielder

Youth career
- 2004–2008: Al-Ahli

Senior career*
| Years | Team | Apps | (Gls) |
| 2008–2009 | Al-Ahli | 0 | (0) |
| 2008 | → Al Rayyan (loan) | ? | (?) |
| 2009–2011 | Najran | 13 | (0) |
| 2011–2012 | Al-Ansar | 8 | (0) |
| 2012 | Al-Shoalah | 1 | (0) |
- * Club domestic league appearances and goals

Turky Al-Thagafi is a Saudi Arabian football player.
