= Mohammed Al-Qarni (footballer, born 1981) =

Saudi Arabian footballer

Personal information
- Full name: Mohammed Al-Qarni
- Date of birth: July 15, 1981 (age 45)
- Place of birth: Saudi Arabia
- Height: 1.72 m (5 ft 7 1/2 in)
- Position: Midfielder

Senior career*
| Years | Team | Apps | (Gls) |
| ???–2010 | Al Faisaly FC | 9 | (0) |
| 2010–2013 | Al-Shoalah | | |
| 2013–2015 | Al-Diriyah | | |
| 2015–2017 | Al Kawkb | | |
- * Club domestic league appearances and goals

Mohammed Al-Qarni is a Saudi Arabian football player.
