= Abdulaziz Al-Abduassalam =

Saudi Arabian footballer

Personal information
- Full name: Abdulaziz Al-Abduassalam
- Place of birth: Saudi Arabia
- Position: Defender

Youth career
- ???–2007: Al-Hilal FC

Senior career*
Years	Team	Apps	(Gls)
2007–2008	Al-Hilal FC		
2008–2009	Abha		
2009–2012	Al-Riyadh SC		
2012–2013	Al-Shoalah	3	(0)
2013–2016	Sdoos		
- * Club domestic league appearances and goals

Abdulaziz Al-Abduassalam is a Saudi Arabian football player as a defender.
