= Abdulrahman Al-Ajlan =

Saudi Arabian footballer

Personal information
- Full name: Abdulrahman Al-Ajlan
- Date of birth: July 11, 1986 (age 40)
- Place of birth: Saudi Arabia
- Height: 1.78 m (5 ft 10 in)
- Position: Forward

Youth career
- ?–2007: Al-Nassr

Senior career*
Years	Team	Apps	(Gls)
2007–2008	Sdoos	?	(?)
2008–2009	Al-Hamadah	?	(?)
2009–2013	Al-Shoalah	?	(?)
2013–2014	Al Hazm		
2014–2017	Al Kwkab	9	(1)
2017–2018	Al-Muzahimiyyah		
2018	Al-Sharq		
- * Club domestic league appearances and goals

Abdulrahman Al-Ajlan is a Saudi Arabian football player who currently plays as a forward .
