= Khaled Naseer =

Saudi Arabian footballer

Personal information
- Full name: Khaled Abdulfattah Naseer
- Date of birth: February 18, 1989 (age 37)
- Place of birth: Saudi Arabia
- Height: 1.73 m (5 ft 8 in)
- Position: Goalkeeper

Youth career
- Al Jandal

Senior career*
Years	Team	Apps	(Gls)
2010–2018	Al-Shoalah		
2018–2019	Al-Sharq		
2019–2020	Al-Anwar		
2020–2023	Al-Sharq		
2023–2024	Al-Asyah		
- * Club domestic league appearances and goals

Khaled Naseer (Arabic: خالد ناصر) is a Saudi Arabian football player who currently plays as a goalkeeper.
