= Rabee Al-Mousa =

Saudi Arabian footballer

Personal information
- Full name: Rabee Sadeeq Eisa Al-Mousa
- Date of birth: December 7, 1984 (age 41)
- Place of birth: Saudi Arabia
- Height: 1.78 m (5 ft 10 in)
- Position: Defender

Youth career
- Al-Hilal FC

Senior career*
Years	Team	Apps	(Gls)
2006–2008	Sdoos		
2008–2009	Al-Ahli	0	(0)
2009	→ Al-Taawon (loan)		
2009–2013	Al-Faisaly	48	(0)
2013–2015	Abha		
2015–2016	Najran	17	(1)
2016–2017	Al-Wahda	0	(0)
2018–2019	Wej		
2020–2021	Al-Hejaz		
- * Club domestic league appearances and goals

Rabee Al-Mousa (Arabic: ربيع الموسى; born December 7, 1984), is a Saudi Arabian professional footballer who plays as a defender.
