= Wasl Al-Thowaibi =

Saudi Arabian footballer

Personal information
- Full name: Wasl Al-Thowaibi
- Date of birth: May 8, 1980 (age 46)
- Place of birth: Saudi Arabia
- Height: 1.78 m (5 ft 10 in)
- Position: Midfielder

Youth career
- Okaz

Senior career*
Years	Team	Apps	(Gls)
2000–2002	Okaz		
2002–2006	Al-Shabab		
2006–2012	Al-Faisaly		
2012–2013	Al-Shoulla	17	(1)
2013–2014	Ohod		
2014–2017	Wej		
2017–2018	Al-Shoulla	19	(4)
2018–2021	Wej		
2021–2022	Okaz		
- * Club domestic league appearances and goals

Wasl Al-Thowaibi is a Saudi Arabian football player who currently plays as a midfielder.
