= Mohsen Al-Eisa =

Saudi Arabian footballer

Personal information
- Full name: Mohsen Al-Eisa
- Date of birth: July 9, 1987 (age 39)
- Place of birth: Saudi Arabia, Medina
- Height: 1.64 m (5 ft 4 1/2 in)
- Position: Winger

Youth career
- 2006–2008: Al-Ansar

Senior career*
Years	Team	Apps	(Gls)
2008–2012	Al-Ansar		
2012–2015	Al-Ahli	30	(4)
2016	Najran	10	(0)
2017	Al-Batin	4	(0)
2018	Abha	6	(1)
2020	Al-Nojoom		
2020	Ohod		
2022–2023	Muhayil		
2023–2024	Al-Muzahimiyyah		
2024–2025	Al-Zayton		
- * Club domestic league appearances and goals

Mohsen Al-Eisa (Arabic: محسن العيسى; born 9 July 1987) is a Saudi footballer who plays as a winger.

== Club career statistics ==
Club	Season	League		Crown Prince Cup		King Cup		ACL		Other		Total	
Club	Season	Apps	Goals	Apps	Goals	Apps	Goals	Apps	Goals	Apps	Goals	Apps	Goals
Al-Ansar	2009–10	1	1	-	-	-	-	-	-	-	-	1	1
Al-Ansar	2010–11	6	6	-	-	-	-	-	-	-	-	6	6
Al-Ansar	2010–11	15	1	-	-	-	-	-	-	-	-	15	1
Al-Ansar	Total	22	8	-	-	-	-	-	-	-	-	22	8
Al-Ahli	2011–12	1	-	-	-	-	-	1	-	1	1	2	1
Al-Ahli	Total	1	-	-	-	-	-	1	-	1	1	2	1
Career Total		23	8	-	-	-	-	1	-	1	1	25	9

== Honours ==
=== Al-Ahli ===
- King Cup of Champions: 2012
