= Burj Maodah =

Saudi Arabian footballer

Personal information
- Full name: Burj Ali Maodah
- Date of birth: March 1, 1983 (age 43)
- Place of birth: Saudi Arabia
- Height: 1.80 m (5 ft 11 in)
- Position: Midfielder

Team information
- Current team: Al-Anwar

Youth career
- Al-Shabab

Senior career*
| Years | Team | Apps | (Gls) |
| 2003–2007 | Al-Shabab | | |
| 2005–2006 | → Al-Raed (loan) | | |
| 2006 | → Al-Hazem (loan) | | |
| 2007–2008 | Al-Watani | | |
| 2008–2017 | Al-Shoulla | | |
| 2017–2018 | Najd | | |
| 2018–2019 | Al-Riyadh | | |
| 2019–2020 | Al Selmiyah | | |
| 2020–2021 | Tuwaiq | | |
| 2022– | Al-Anwar | | |
- * Club domestic league appearances and goals

Burj Maodah (Arabic: برج معوضة; born 1 March 1983) is a Saudi Arabian footballer plays for Al-Anwar as a midfielder.
