= Fahad Al-Munaif (footballer, born 1989) =

Saudi Arabian footballer

Personal information
- Full name: Fahad Mohammed Al-Munaif
- Date of birth: November 25, 1989 (age 36)
- Place of birth: Saudi Arabia
- Height: 1.76 m (5 ft 9 1/2 in)
- Position: Forward

Senior career*
Years	Team	Apps	(Gls)
2008–2009	Al-Nassr		
2009–2010	Al-Fayha		
2010–2013	Al-Shabab	4	(0)
2012–2013	→ Al-Shoulla (loan)	15	(2)
2013–2015	Al-Shoulla	30	(3)
2015–2017	Al-Faisaly	22	(0)
2017–2019	Al-Shoulla	51	(12)
2019–2020	Al-Qadsiah	4	(0)
2020–2021	Ohod	2	(0)
2021	Al-Shoulla	6	(0)
2021–2022	Al-Sharq		
2022	Al-Nairyah		
2022–2023	Al-Sharq		
2023	Bisha		
- * Club domestic league appearances and goals

Fahad Al-Munaif is a Saudi Arabian footballer who plays as a forward.

== Honours ==
Al Shabab

- Saudi Professional League: 2011-12
