= Mohammed Al-Harthi =

Saudi Arabian footballer (born 1994)

Personal information
- Full name: Mohammed Abdullah Al-Harthi
- Date of birth: August 12, 1994 (age 32)
- Place of birth: Saudi Arabia
- Position: Winger

Team information
- Current team: Jeddah
- Number: 24

Youth career
- Al Ahli

Senior career*
Years	Team	Apps	(Gls)
2014–2018	Al-Ahli	1	(0)
2017	→ Al-Batin (loan)	4	(0)
2018–2019	Al-Mujazzal		
2019–2022	Al-Jabalain	46	(10)
2022–2023	Al-Qaisumah	27	(3)
2023–2024	Al-Najma	31	(3)
2024–2025	Al-Jandal	17	(1)
2025–	Jeddah	0	(0)

International career
2014–2015	Saudi Arabia U23	3	(0)
- * Club domestic league appearances and goals as of 20 September 2020

Mohammed Al-Harthi (Arabic: محمد الحارثي; born August 12, 1994) is a Saudi Arabian professional footballer who currently plays for Jeddah as a winger.

== Career ==
On 12 June 2023, Al-Harthi joined Al-Najma. On 13 September 2024, Al-Harthi joined Al-Jandal. On 20 August 2025, Al-Harthi joined Jeddah.
