= Juan José Maqueda =

Spanish footballer and manager

Personal information
- Full name: Juan José Sánchez Maqueda
- Date of birth: 23 January 1969 (age 57)
- Place of birth: Madrid, Spain
- Height: 1.80 m (5 ft 11 in)
- Position: Midfielder

Youth career
- 1978–1986: Real Madrid

Senior career*
Years	Team	Apps	(Gls)
1986–1988	Real Madrid B	15	(1)
1988–1993	Real Madrid	52	(4)
1989–1990	→ Logroñés (loan)	29	(1)
1993–1994	Real Madrid B	11	(0)
1994–1995	Valencia	9	(0)
1995–1998	Albacete	20	(1)
1996–1997	→ Racing Ferrol (loan)	25	(1)
1998	→ Fuenlabrada (loan)	10	(0)
1998–1999	Irapuato	5	(0)
1999–2000	Panionios	21	(0)
Total		197	(8)

Managerial career
- 2003–2005: Real Madrid B (assistant)
- 2005–2006: Real Madrid (assistant)
- 2006–2007: Levante (assistant)
- 2007–2008: Celta (assistant)
- 2008–2009: Real Madrid B (assistant)
- 2010: Vaslui (assistant)
- 2011–2012: Al Ittihad
- 2013–2014: Al-Shoulla
- 2014: Al Fateh
- 2014–2015: Al Masry
- 2017–2018: Al Ittihad
- 2019–2020: Al-Shoulla
- 2020: Moghreb Tétouan
- 2022: Al-Kawkab
- * Club domestic league appearances and goals

Juan José Sánchez Maqueda (born 23 January 1969) is a Spanish former professional footballer who played as a midfielder.

He amassed La Liga totals of 110 matches and six goals over seven seasons, representing mainly Real Madrid. In 2011, he became a manager.

== Playing career ==
Born in Madrid, Maqueda spent 16 years with Real Madrid youth and reserve sides comprised. He made his La Liga debut on 2 January 1988 aged 18 years and 11 months, playing the full 90 minutes in a 2–1 home win against FC Barcelona. He scored his first goal with the main squad later that month, in a 4–0 victory over Cádiz CF also at the Santiago Bernabéu Stadium.

Maqueda returned to Real in summer 1990, after a season-long loan with CD Logroñés. He contributed 24 games – 19 starts – and one goal in the first year upon his return, but the team finished in third place. He added three appearances in the European Cup, netting in the 4–1 away defeat of Odense Boldklub on 18 September 1990.

Maqueda spent nearly two years on the sidelines due to an anterior cruciate ligament injury, from which he never fully recovered. After leaving the Merengues, he represented six clubs in as many years, appearing for Valencia CF and Albacete Balompié in the top flight and having abroad stints with C.D. Irapuato and Panionios FC. He retired in 2000, at 31.

== Coaching career ==
Maqueda spent six years as assistant manager to Juan Ramón López Caro, with the pair being in charge of Real Madrid and Levante UD in the top tier and RC Celta de Vigo in the Segunda División. They worked for a few months with FC Vaslui, leaving in October 2010.

Maqueda began working as a head coach in 2011, with Al Ittihad Alexandria Club in Egypt. Two years later, in October, he replaced Ahmad Al-Ajlani at the helm of Saudi Arabian club Al-Shoulla FC; his side ranked last with one point when he arrived, but managed to avoid relegation from the Pro League in the last match.

On 27 May 2014, Maqueda was appointed at Al Fateh SC. He returned to the African nation in December, signing for Al Masry SC.

On 2 November 2019, Maqueda returned to Al-Shoulla, now in the second tier. He left the club the following 28 June, as the season was put on hold due to the COVID-19 pandemic.

Starting in October 2020, Maqueda then had a two-month spell in the Moroccan Botola with MA Tétouan.

== Honours ==
=== Player ===
Real Madrid

- La Liga: 1987–88, 1988–89
- Copa del Rey: 1988–89
- Supercopa de España: 1988, 1990
