= Mishel Bilibashi =

Albanian football player

Personal information
- Full name: Mishel Bilibashi
- Date of birth: 8 March 1989 (age 37)
- Place of birth: Tirana, Albania
- Position: Midfielder

Youth career
- Olimpic

Senior career*
Years	Team	Apps	(Gls)
2008–2009	Olimpic CF		
2009–2010	Gramshi	21	(0)
2010–2011	Gramozi	36	(5)
2012	Dinamo Tirana	9	(0)
2012–2013	Laçi	23	(1)
2013–2014	Kjelsås	9	(1)
2014	Laçi	9	(0)
2015	Fostiras	3	(0)
- * Club domestic league appearances and goals as of 14 January 2015

Mishel Bilibashi (born 8 March 1989) is an Albanian football player who played in the Albanian Superliga.
