= Eusebiu Tudor =

Romanian footballer and manager

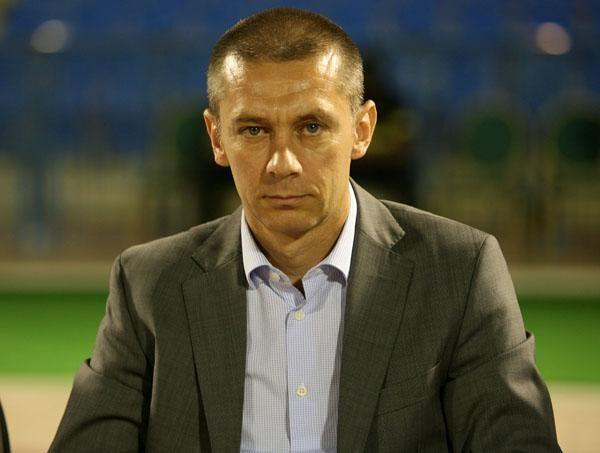

Personal information
- Full name: Eusebiu Iulian Tudor
- Date of birth: 1 July 1974 (age 52)
- Place of birth: Ploiești, Romania
- Height: 1.79 m (5 ft 10 1/2 in)
- Position: Midfielder

Senior career*
| Years | Team | Apps | (Gls) |
| 1995–1996 | Petrolistul Boldești | | |
| 1996–1997 | Danubiana Ploiești | 19 | (1) |
| 1997–1998 | Midia Năvodari | 24 | (5) |
| 1998–1999 | Cimentul Fieni | 30 | (4) |
| 1999–2003 | Petrolul Ploiești | 85 | (4) |
| 2003 | Oțelul Galați | 9 | (0) |
| 2004 | Vaslui | 12 | (0) |
| 2004 | Inter Gaz București | 15 | (2) |
| 2005 | Gloria Bistrița | 0 | (0) |
| 2005–2006 | Astra Ploiești | 5 | (0) |
| Total | | 199 | (16) |

Managerial career
- 2008–2009: Petrolul Ploiești
- 2012: Sportul Studențesc
- 2012–2013: Chindia Târgoviște
- 2013: Al-Ettifaq
- 2013: Al-Shoulla
- 2014: Fortuna Poiana Câmpina
- 2014–2015: Al-Shoulla
- 2015: Petrolul Ploiești
- 2017–2018: Al-Khaleej
- 2018–2019: Al-Qadsia (assistant)
- 2020: Voluntari (assistant)
- 2021–2022: Gaz Metan Mediaș (assistant)
- 2022: Al-Shoulla
- 2022–2023: Metaloglobus București
- 2024–2025: Unirea Ungheni
- 2025–2026: ASA Târgu Mureș
- * Club domestic league appearances and goals

Eusebiu Iulian Tudor (born 1 July 1974) is a Romanian professional football manager and former player.

== Honours ==
=== Player ===
Petrolul Ploiești

- Divizia B: 2002–03
