= Mansoor Al-Najai =

Saudi Arabian footballer (born 1978)

Personal information
- Full name: Mansoor Al-Najai
- Date of birth: July 1, 1978 (age 48)
- Place of birth: Jeddah, Saudi Arabia
- Height: 1.82 m (5 ft 11 1/2 in)
- Position: Goalkeeper

Youth career
- Damac

Senior career*
Years	Team	Apps	(Gls)
1998–2010	Al-Ahli	234	(0)
2007–2008	→ Al Hazm (loan)	21	(0)
2010–2012	Al-Qadisiyah	48	(0)
2012–2013	Hajer	11	(0)
2013–2016	Al-Faisaly	59	(0)
2016–2017	Al-Batin	1	(0)
2018	Najran	0	(0)

International career
2004–2010	Saudi Arabia	12	(0)
- * Club domestic league appearances and goals as of 26 January 2017

Mansoor Al-Najai (Arabic: منصور النجعي) was born In 1978 in Jeddah, Saudi Arabia and is a Saudi Arabian professional footballer who plays as a goalkeeper for Najaran SC. He is often regarded as one of the most influential players in Saudi Arabian football.

Al-Najai has won 11 trophies in his career including 3 Saudi Federation Cups and an Arab Champions league at club level, winning the Arabian gulf cup at international level. He has played 376 club games over 21 years. Al-Najai began his career with top Saudi Arabian club Al-Alhi in 1999 where he made his professional debut in the 1999/2000 season in the Saudi Arabian professional league. He stayed at the club until he was sent on loan for the 2007/8 season to Al Hazm. After 11 years at Al-Alhi, he moved to Al-Qadisiyah on a free transfer where he stayed for two seasons until he moved to Hajer on another free transfer. He only spent 1 season there playing 11 games. In the next four seasons he played 60 professional games for two clubs, Al-Faisaly and Al Batin. He is one of the oldest players in any Saudi Arabian league at the age of 40 and he has never played for a club outside of Saudi Arabia.

He represented Saudi Arabia in 12 matches which were in 5 different seasons. He played for Saudi Arabia for two FIFA matches including the FIFA World Cup 2010 qualifiers against Iran and Uzbekistan where he only conceded one goal as Saudi Arabia drew 1–1 against Iran and won 4–0 against Uzbekistan. He played two games in the 2004 AFC Asian Cup and he won the 2003-04 Arabian Gulf Cup.

== Club career ==
=== Al-Alhi ===
Al-Najai joined the Al-Alhi academy from Damac F.C. and represented them at every youth level until 1999 where he signed a contract with Al-Alhi senior team after he performed very well in the U-23 Saudi Arabia professional league. He was voted the Most Promising Asian Youth Player of 1999.

=== Al-Alhi ===
At the age of 21, on his birthday, Al-Najai signed a professional contract for the top Saudi Arabian proefesional league club Al- Alhi. He was given the number 21 jersey which he kept at every club until Al-Batin and Najaran SC. At first, he struggled for game time, but half-way through the season, the side's first choice goalkeeper got injured which meant Al-Najai had to play. He impressed in his first season playing 15 games, keeping 5 clean sheets and saving a penalty on his debut. He played very well and quickly became their first choice goalkeeper. He helped Al-Alhi to finish second in the Saudi Professional league. In the following season, 200/01, Al-Najai kept performing well and won his first trophy in the same season, the Saudi Federation Cup. In the next season of 2001/02, Al-Najai led his team to four trophies which were the Crown Prince Cup, a Saudi Federation Cup, an international Friendship Championship and the Gulf Club Champions cup. In the 2002/3 Season, he finished second in the league and won another International Friendship championship. He was an important player in winning the club's first ever Arab Champions League and also won another Gulf Club Champions cup. He lost in the finals of the Crown Prince cup and Saudi federation cup. He was voted runner-up as the best Saudi Professional league player. In the next season, Al-Najai was selected for the 2004 AFC Asian Cup to represent Saudi Arabia which was his first ever call-up after some great performances for Al-Alhi. He lost in the Crown Prince cup final again. Al-Najai continued to play for Al-Alhi for the next three seasons where he won a Saudi Federation cup and a Crown Prince Cup. He became less important for the team and was sent out on loan for the 2007/08 season to Al-Hazem. Back at the club for the 2008/09 season, Al-Najai played 20 league games and once again was selected for Saudi Arabia. He then played his last season for Al-Alhi and only played seven games. He won fan's best player in his final season for the club.

=== Al Hazem (on-loan) ===
He became less important for his team and was sent out on loan for the 2007/08 season to Al Hazem who were in the Saudi Professional league at the time. He performed very well and was voted the third best goalkeeper in Asia for his great performances. He was selected again for three Saudi Arabia games.

=== Al-Qadisyah ===
Al-Najai signed a two-year contract for the club and came on a free transfer. He played 25 games in his first season and kept 12 clean sheets and saved three penalties. He won the golden glove and best goalkeeper of the Saudi Professional league for his performances. He won these two awards again the following season for playing 21 games and keeping 12 clean sheets. His contract was not renewed and moved to Al-Faisaly.

=== Al-Faisaly ===
Al-Najai signed a three-year contract with the Saudi Professional League Club and played 25 games in his first season and kept 7 clean sheets. In his next season, he only played 14 games because of injury but still managed to keep 7 clean sheets. In his last season for the club, he played 20 games, saving 6 penalties and keeping 10 clean sheets. His contract was not renewed and moved on a free to Hajer FC.

=== Hajer FC ===
Al-Najai signed a one-year contract for the Saudi Professional league club but suffered many injuries which caused him only to play 11 games and only kept 2 clean sheets. Hajer FC finished 5th, their best position ever in the top-flight.

=== Al-Batin ===
Al-Najai signed for recently promoted Al-Batin on a year contract and played only one game for the top-flight club. He was given the number 30 jersey which he kept when playing for Najaran SC too. He announced his retirement in 2017 but three weeks later came back because he said "I was bored."

=== Najaran SC ===
Al-Najai signed for first division club in 2018 and played 8 matches for the club in the 2018/19 season.

== International career ==
Al-Najai was born in Saudi Arabia and was first called up in 2004 for two friendlies and came on as a substitute for both of them where he wore the number 22 jersey. Also in 2004, he played the final group game in the AFC Asian Cup which he saved a penalty against Turkmenistan. He was also selected for the 2004 Arabian Gulf Cup which he played two games in and they eventually won the cup. This was his only ever international title. In 2008, he played 5 games, including two world cup qualifiers against Iran and Uzbekistan. He played three friendlies for Saudi Arabia in 2009. He played at three Arabian gulf cups and one Asian cup. He has played 12 times for Saudi Arabia and has never played at a FIFA World Cup.

== Honours ==
=== Club ===
AFC Champions League : 2000

Crown Prince Cup: 2002, 2007

Saudi Federation Cup: 2001, 2002, 2007

Arab Champions League: 2003

Gulf Club Champions cup: 2002, 2003

International Friendship Championship: 2001–02, 2002–03

=== International ===
==== Saudi Arabia ====
Arabian Gulf Cup: 2003-04

=== Individual ===
Most Promising Asian Youth Player: 1999

Al Alhi Fans' Player of the year: 2000-2001, 2009-10

Saudi Professional League Golden Glove: 2000-2001, 2003-2004

Saudi Professional League Best Goalkeeper: 2000-2001, 2010–11, 2011–12
