= Lassana Fané =

Malian footballer

Personal information
- Date of birth: 11 November 1987 (age 39)
- Place of birth: Bamako, Mali
- Height: 1.83 m (6 ft 0 in)
- Position: Midfielder

Youth career
- 2001–2005: Djoliba

Senior career*
Years	Team	Apps	(Gls)
2006–2009	Djoliba		
2009–2010	Al-Merrikh		(6)
2010–2011	Al Ahli Tripoli		
2011–2012	Kuwait	20	(2)
2012–2015	Al-Shoulla	59	(14)
2015–2016	Olympique de Khouribga	27	(1)
2016–2017	Al-Batin	7	(0)

International career
2008–2010	Mali	11	(1)

Managerial career
- 2021-: Djoliba (assistant)
- * Club domestic league appearances and goals

Lassana Fané (born 11 November 1987) is a Malian former professional footballer who played as a midfielder.

== Club career ==
Born in Bamako, Mali, Fané began his career in the youth of Djoliba AC and was for the season 2006 promoted to the senior team. In 2008, was voted "most outstanding player" of the Malian Première Division.

On 14 January 2009, after a third season with Djoliba AC, Fané moved to Sudanese Premier League side Al-Merrikh.

In December 2010, he left Al-Merreikh to join Libyan Premier League club Al Ahli Tripoli.

In June 2011 Fané Joined Kuwaiti Premier League side Al Kuwait.

== International career ==
Fané was a member of the Mali national team and played the 2010 Africa Cup of Nations in Angola. He played for his country the Tournoi de l'UEMOA 2008 in Bamako. His last game for Mali was against Malawi in which Mali won 3–1. The game was played on 18 January 2010 and was at the 2010 AFCON.

== Honours ==
- Malian Première Division most outstanding player: 2008
