= Kudu (restaurant) =

Fast food chain in Saudi Arabia

كودو

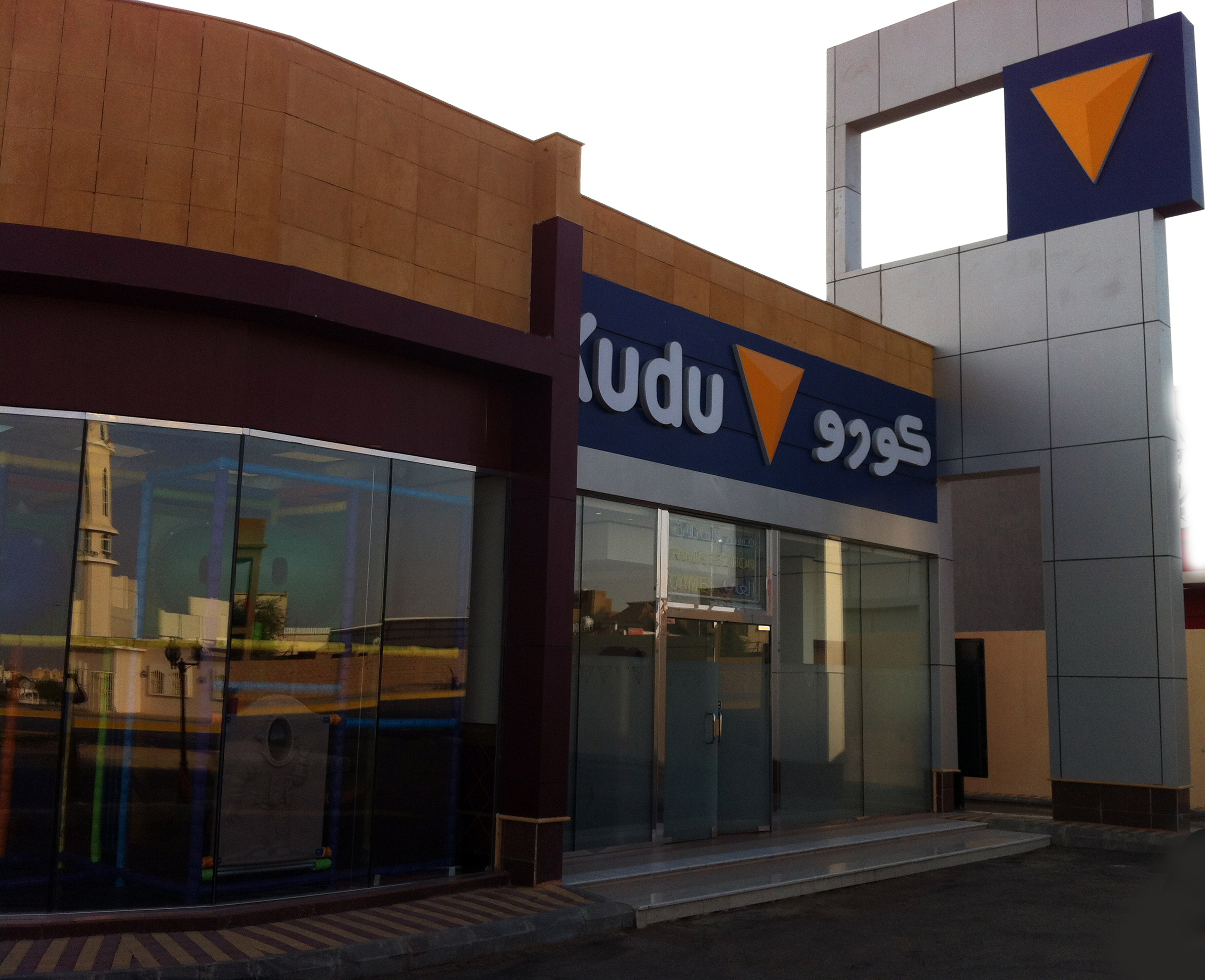
- A Kudu restaurant in Unaizah, Saudi Arabia
- Type: Public
- Industry: Restaurants
- Founded: Saudi Arabia (1988; 38 years ago)
- Headquarters: Riyadh, Saudi Arabia
- Number of locations: over 350
- Area served: Saudi Arabia; Kuwait
- Key people: Murat Ungun (Chief Executive Officer)
- Products: Burgers and Sandwiches
- Website: kudu.com.sa

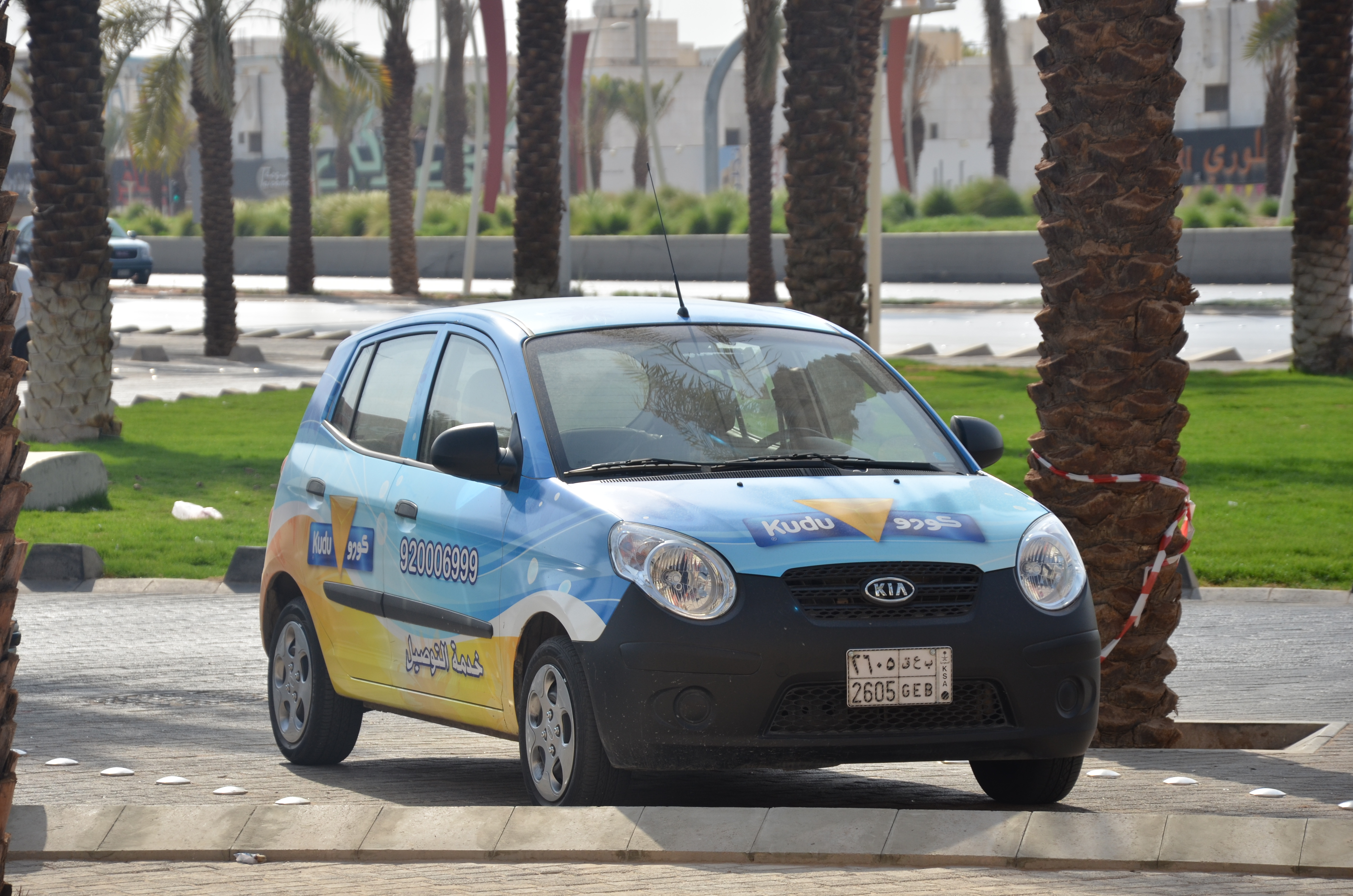
Kudu delivery car

Kudu (Arabic: كودو Kūdū) is a fast food chain in Saudi Arabia. It was established in 1988, and has 316 locations in Saudi Arabia and Bahrain with more than 5,000 employees. The first branch opened in Riyadh on 16 April 1988 on 30th street. Kudu serves burgers and sandwiches, which are popular with Saudis, but its specialty is sandwiches. It serves breakfast as well, with some Western-style menu items including waffles.

== See also ==
- List of hamburger restaurants
