= Sdoos Club =

Association football club in Saudi Arabia

Sdoos
- Full name: Sdoos Club
- Ground: Al Sayeg Stadium, 3,000 capacity Diriyah, Saudi Arabia
- Chairman: ?
- Manager: ?
- League: Saudi Fourth Division
- 2015–16: Group B, 4th place

Sdoos Club is a Saudi Arabian football (soccer) team in Sdoos city playing in the Saudi Fourth Division.

== Stadium ==
Currently the team plays at the 3,000-capacity Al Sayeg Stadium.

== Honours ==
Saudi First Division (Level 2)

- Winners (1): 1998–99

== Notable players ==
- Mohammed Manga
- Bader Al-Khamees
- Faisal Al-Merqeb
- Ahmed Hebh
- Mohammed Al-Khojali
- Abdulaziz Al-Janoubi
- Abdulrahman Al-Ajlan
- Khalid Sharhili
- Abdulaziz Al-Yousef
- Rabee Al-Mousa
- Abdulaziz Al-Abduassalam
- Yahia Al-Shehri
- Khaled Awaji

== See also ==
- List of football clubs in Saudi Arabia
