= Al-Sadd FC (Saudi Arabia) =

Association football club in Saudi Arabia

Al-Sadd
- Full name: Al-Sadd FC
- Founded: 1979; 47 years ago
- Ground: Al-Kharj, Riyadh, Saudi Arabia
- Manager: Ahmed Mdeghri
- League: Saudi Second Division
- 2024–25: Saudi Second Division, 13th (Group B)
Home colours	Away colours

Al-Sadd FC is a Saudi Arabian professional football team based in Al-Kharj, that competes in the Saudi Second Division.

== Current squad ==
As of Saudi Second Division:

Note: Flags indicate national team as defined under FIFA eligibility rules; some limited exceptions apply. Players may hold more than one non-FIFA nationality.

No.	Pos.	Nation	Player
1	GK	KSA	Sultan Al-Qahtani
4	DF	KSA	Rashed Al-Dwesan
5	DF	KSA	Meshaal Al-Ajmi
6	DF	KSA	Saad Al-Julaifi
8	MF	KSA	Majed Al-Ammari
10	MF	KSA	Tamim Al-Dawsari
11	MF	KSA	Mousa Al-Ghufairi
13	FW	KSA	Khalil Hazazi
14	DF	KSA	Turki Names

No.	Pos.	Nation	Player
15	DF	KSA	Ahmed Al-Owairdhi
23	GK	KSA	Basel Al-Shoeil
55	GK	KSA	Abdulaziz Al-Qahtani
70	MF	KSA	Hatem Okairy
80	MF	KSA	Ziyad Sohar
88	MF	KSA	Abdulshakur Tijani
94	MF	KSA	Saad Al-Dossari
96	MF	KSA	Abdullah Al-Khashlan

== See also ==
- List of football clubs in Saudi Arabia
