= Meshaal Al-Ajmi =

Saudi Arabian footballer

Personal information
- Full name: Meshaal Mohammed Al-Ajmi
- Date of birth: January 5, 1992 (age 34)
- Place of birth: Saudi Arabia
- Height: 1.78 m (5 ft 10 in)
- Position: Defender

Team information
- Current team: Al-Sadd
- Number: 5

Senior career*
Years	Team	Apps	(Gls)
2011–2018	Al-Shoalah		
2018–2019	Al Kawkb		
2019–2020	Al-Riyadh		
2020–2025	Al-Sharq		
2025–	Al-Sadd		
- * Club domestic league appearances and goals

Meshaal Al-Ajmi is a Saudi Arabian footballer who plays for Al-Sadd as a defender.

== Career ==
On 30 August 2019, Al-Ajmi joined Al-Riyadh. On 11 October 2020, Al-Ajmi joined Al-Sharq. On 3 October 2025, Al-Ajmi joined Al-Sadd.
