= Al-Shoulla Club Stadium =

Sports venue in Al-Kharj, Saudi Arabia

Al-Shoulla Stadium
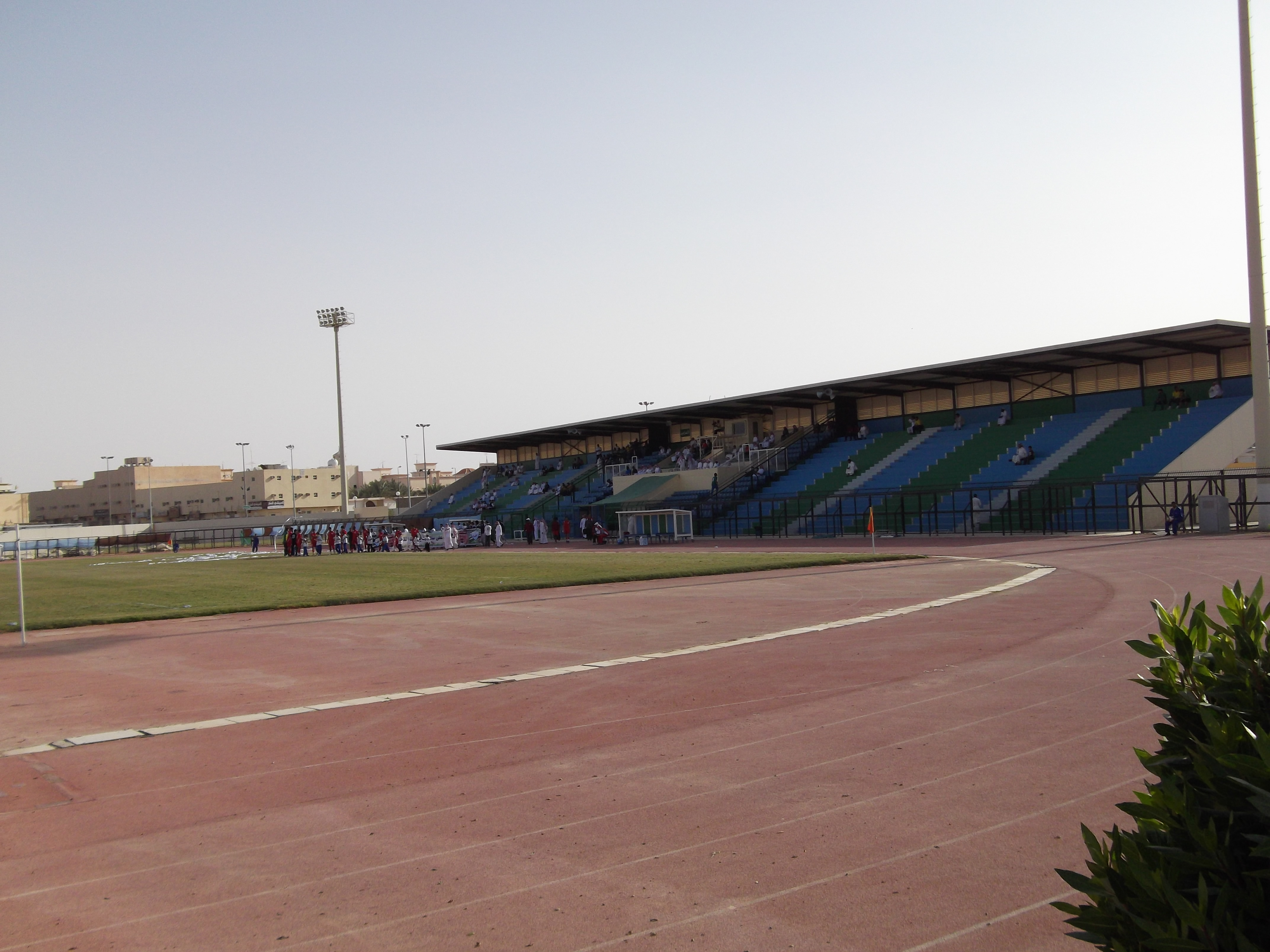
- Interactive map of Al-Shoulla Stadium
- Full name: Al-Shoulla Club Stadium
- Location: Al-Kharj, Saudi Arabia
- Coordinates: 24.16695°N 47.33614°E
- Owner: General Presidency of Youth Welfare
- Capacity: 8,000
- Surface: Grass

Construction
- Opened: 1985

Tenants
- Al-Shoulla; Al-Kawkab

Al-Shoulla Stadium is a multi-use stadium in Al-Kharj, Saudi Arabia. It is currently used mostly for football matches. It is the home stadium of Al-Shoulla and Al-Kawkab.

== See also ==
- List of football stadiums in Saudi Arabia
