= Al-Shoulla FC =

Association football club in Saudi Arabia

Al-Shoulla نادي الشعلة السعودي
- Full name: Al-Shoulah Football Club
- Founded: 1963; 63 years ago
- Ground: Al-Shoulla Club Stadium; Al-Kharj, Saudi Arabia
- Capacity: 8,000
- President: Fahad Al-Tofail
- Manager: Abdulla Darwish
- League: Second Division
- 2024–25: Saudi Second Division League 3rd, Group A
- Website: alshullahclub.com
Home colours	Away colours	Third colours

Al-Shoulla (Arabic: نادي الشعلة لكرة القدم; lit. 'Torch') is a Saudi Arabian professional football club based in Al-Kharj, playing in the Saudi Second Division.

They won the Saudi First Division League in 2011–12 and were promoted to the top-level, the Saudi Pro League.

== History ==
The kit providers are Puma.

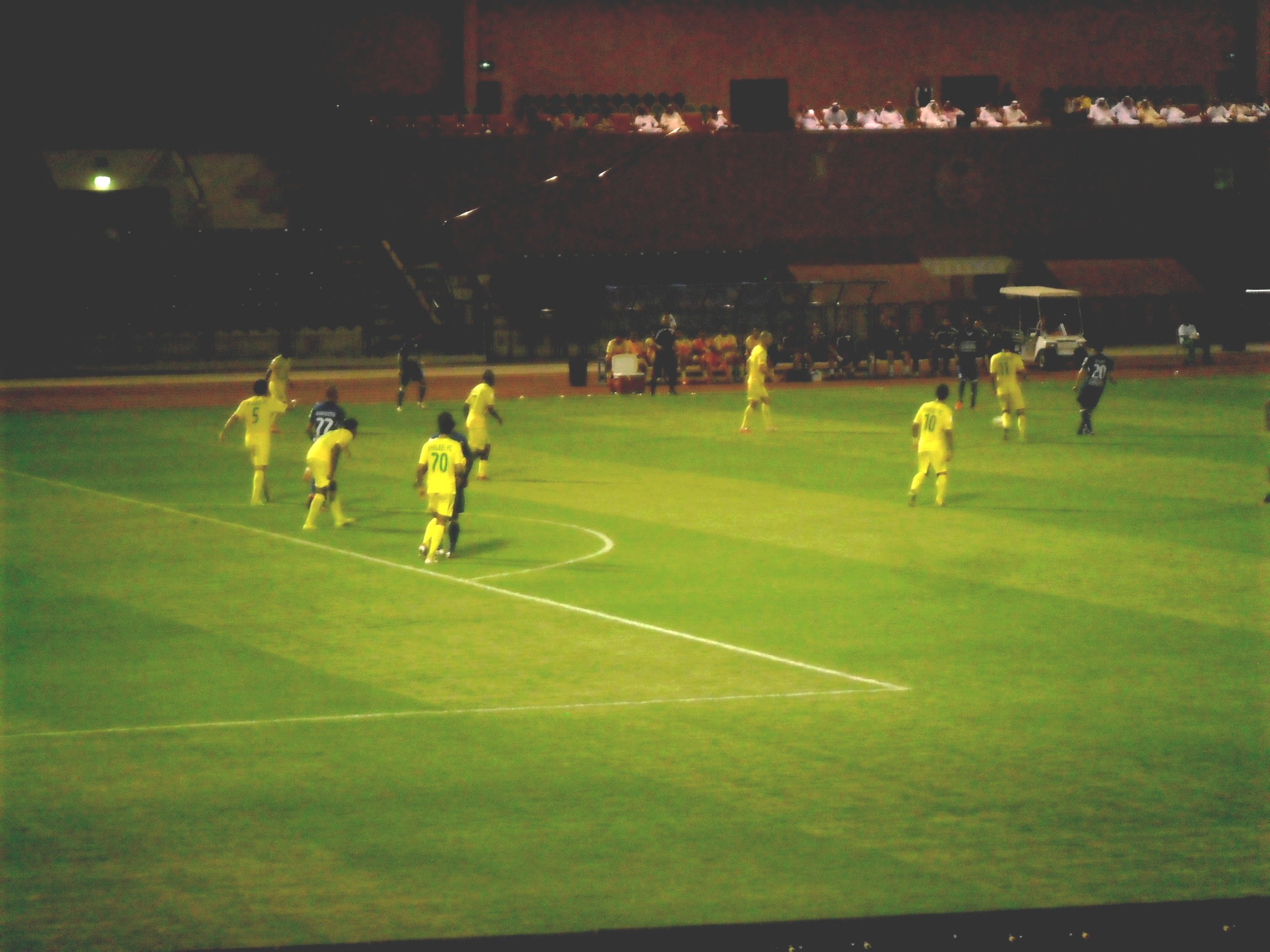
Al-Khaleej vs Al-Shoala during the 2014–15 Saudi League season.

== Honours ==
Saudi First Division League

- Winners (1): 2011–12
- Runners-up (2): 1996–97, 2000–01

Saudi Second Division League

- Winners (3): 1981–82, 1986–87, 2008–09
- Runners-up (1): 1997–98

Prince Faisal bin Fahd Cup for Division 1 and 2 Teams

- Runners-up (1): 1999–00

== Managers ==
- (Iraq) Akram Salman (1993–94)
- (Algeria) Abdellah Mecheri (1998–99)
- (Saudi Arabia) Majed Al-Tufail (2006)
- (Saudi Arabia) Ali Kmeikh (2007–09)
- (Tunisia) Kais Yâakoubi (2009–10)
- (Egypt) Aboud El Khodary (2011)
- (Egypt) Mohammed Salah (Dec 1, 2011 – Dec 31, 2012)
- (Tunisia) Ahmad Al-Ajlani (2013)
- (Spain) José Maqueda (2013–2014)
- (Romania) Eusebiu Tudor (2014–2015)
- (Saudi Arabia) Majdi Tolbah (2015–2016)
- (Brazil) Ademir Fonseca (2016–present)

== Current squad ==
As of Saudi Second Division:

Note: Flags indicate national team as defined under FIFA eligibility rules; some limited exceptions apply. Players may hold more than one non-FIFA nationality.

No.	Pos.	Nation	Player
2	DF	KSA	Ahmed Al-Anbar
3	MF	KSA	Abdullah Al-Damak
5	DF	KSA	Ali Hazazi
8	MF	KSA	Abdulelah Al-Shanqiti
9	FW	TOG	Hunlede Kissimbo
10	MF	KSA	Bandar Al-Qahtani
15	DF	SSD	Rashid Toha
17	MF	KSA	Mohammed Al-Nukhylan
18	DF	KSA	Mabrok Al-Najrani
19	FW	KSA	Abdulrahman Sharahili
20	MF	CIV	Sinali Bere
22	GK	KSA	Rawaf Al-Malah
26	DF	KSA	Saleh Al-Nashmi
30	DF	KSA	Wael Al-Tas
38	FW	KSA	Turki Al-Farhan
43	MF	KSA	Mohammed Al-Shahrani

No.	Pos.	Nation	Player
49	GK	KSA	Rakan Al-Mallah
52	GK	KSA	Abdulrahman Al-Marhoum
55	DF	KSA	Nawaf Al-Duraywish
66	MF	KSA	Rakan Al-Hammad
76	DF	KSA	Ahmed Al-Habib
88	DF	KSA	Mousa Sufyani
—	GK	KSA	Ali Al-Abdulsalam
—	GK	KSA	Abdullah Al-Ghamdi
—	DF	KSA	Ghassan Al-Qurashi
—	DF	KSA	Abdulmajeed Arishi
—	MF	KSA	Mohammed Al-Tofail
—	MF	KSA	Moayad Al-Houti
—	MF	KSA	Abdullah Haqawi
—	FW	KSA	Majed Al-Mutairi
—	MF	KSA	Al Mutasim Seddiq (on loan from Al-Jabalain)
—	FW	KSA	Abdulaziz Al-Ajian (on loan from Al-Riyadh)

== See also ==
- List of football clubs in Saudi Arabia
