= 2025–26 Al-Fayha FC season =

Al-Fayha
2025–26 season
- President: Tawfiq Al-Modaiheem
- Manager: Pedro Emanuel
- Stadium: Al Majma'ah Sports City
- Pro League: Pre-season
- King's Cup: Round of 32
- All statistics correct as of 1 July 2025.

The 2025–26 season is Al-Fayha's 72nd year in their existence and their eighth non-consecutive season in the Pro League. The club will participate in the Pro League and the King's Cup.

The season covers the period from 1 July 2025 to 30 June 2026.

== Players ==
=== Squad information ===
As of 1 February 2025

Note: Flags indicate national team as defined under FIFA eligibility rules; some limited exceptions apply. Players may hold more than one non-FIFA nationality.

No.	Pos.	Nation	Player
1	GK	KSA	Abdulraouf Al-Duqayl
2	DF	KSA	Mukhair Al-Rashidi
3	DF	BRA	Rangel
4	DF	KSA	Sami Al-Khaibari (captain)
5	DF	ENG	Chris Smalling
8	MF	ESP	Alejandro Pozuelo
10	FW	ZAM	Fashion Sakala
13	MF	BIH	Gojko Cimirot
14	MF	KSA	Mansor Al-Beshe
15	MF	KSA	Abdulhadi Al-Harajin
20	MF	UZB	Otabek Shukurov
21	DF	KSA	Ziyad Al-Sahafi
22	DF	KSA	Mohammed Al-Baqawi
24	MF	KSA	Sattam Al-Rouqi

No.	Pos.	Nation	Player
29	MF	KSA	Nawaf Al-Harthi
33	GK	KSA	Sattam Al-Shammari
34	GK	KSA	Osama Al-Thumairy
46	MF	KSA	Osama Al-Turki
47	DF	KSA	Mohammed Al-Dowaish
52	GK	PAN	Orlando Mosquera
55	MF	KSA	Ali Al-Hussain
66	MF	KSA	Rakan Kaabi
70	MF	KSA	Abdulrahman Al-Enezi
75	DF	KSA	Khalid Al-Rammah
77	MF	KSA	Khalid Kaabi
99	FW	KSA	Malek Al-Abdulmenem
—	DF	KSA	Muteb Al-Khaldi

== Transfers and loans ==
=== Transfers in ===
Entry date	Position	No.	Player	From club	Fee	Ref.
30 June 2025	DF	21	(Saudi Arabia) Muteb Al-Khaldi	(Saudi Arabia) Al-Ain	End of loan	
30 June 2025	MF	70	(Saudi Arabia) Abdulrahman Al-Enezi	(Saudi Arabia) Al-Orobah	End of loan	
1 July 2025	DF	–	(Saudi Arabia) Ahmed Bamsaud	(Saudi Arabia) Al-Ittihad	Free	
1 July 2025	MF	–	(Saudi Arabia) Rayan Al-Mutairi	(Saudi Arabia) Al-Najma	Free	
1 July 2025	MF	–	(Spain) Jason	(Portugal) Arouca	Free	
24 July 2025	DF	–	(Saudi Arabia) Ali Al-Nakhli	(Saudi Arabia) Al-Ansar	Free	
6 August 2025	MF	–	(Algeria) Yassine Benzia	(Azerbaijan) Qarabağ	Free	
8 August 2025	MF	–	(Saudi Arabia) Ammar Al-Khaibari	(Saudi Arabia) Al-Zulfi	Free	
11 August 2025	MF	–	(Saudi Arabia) Abdullah Al-Jouei		Free	
20 August 2025	MF	–	(Guinea-Bissau) Alfa Semedo	(Saudi Arabia) Neom	Free	
25 August 2025	FW	–	(Republic of the Congo) Silvère Ganvoula	(Italy) Monza	Undisclosed	
10 September 2025	DF	–	(Venezuela) Mikel Villanueva	(Portugal) Vitória	Free	

=== Loans in ===
Start date	End date	Position	No.	Player	From club	Fee	Ref.
10 September 2025	End of season	MF	–	(Cyprus) Stylianos Vrontis	(Cyprus) APOEL	$58,500	

=== Transfers out ===
Exit date	Position	No.	Player	To club	Fee	Ref.
30 June 2025	DF	23	(Brazil) Gabriel Vareta	(Brazil) Palmeiras	End of loan	
30 June 2025	FW	27	(Saudi Arabia) Redha Al-Abdullah	(Saudi Arabia) Al-Ettifaq	End of loan	
4 July 2025	DF	25	(Saudi Arabia) Faris Abdi	(Saudi Arabia) Neom	$4,000,000	
15 July 2025	FW	9	(Uruguay) Renzo López	(Brazil) Vitória	Free	
23 July 2025	FW	7	(Nigeria) Henry Onyekuru	(Turkey) Gençlerbirliği	Free	
3 August 2025	DF	62	(Saudi Arabia) Hussam Majrashi	(Saudi Arabia) Al-Anwar	Free	
19 August 2025	MF	13	(Bosnia and Herzegovina) Gojko Cimirot	(Bosnia and Herzegovina) Sarajevo	Free	
11 September 2025	DF	21	(Saudi Arabia) Muteb Al-Khaldi	(Saudi Arabia) Al-Adalah	Free	
12 September 2025	DF	3	(Brazil) Rangel	(United Arab Emirates) Al-Dhafra	Free	
14 September 2025	MF	77	(Saudi Arabia) Khalid Kaabi	(Saudi Arabia) Al-Anwar	Free	

=== Loans out ===
Start date	End date	Position	No.	Player	To club	Fee	Ref.
4 September 2025	End of season	MF	15	(Saudi Arabia) Abdulhadi Al-Harajin	(Saudi Arabia) Al-Hazem	None	

== Pre-season and friendlies ==
3 August 2025 Friendly	Al-Fayha (Saudi Arabia)	1–4	(Qatar) Umm Salal	Horst, Netherlands
16:00 CEST	61' (o.g.)	Report		Stadium: Sportpark Ter Horst

6 August 2025 Friendly	Al-Fayha (Saudi Arabia)	2–4	(Greece) OFI	Zaltbommel, Netherlands
17:00 CEST	Al-Harthi 70'; Al-Abdulmenem 78'	Report	Fountas 12'; Theodosoulakis 45', 72'; Salcedo 83'	Stadium: Eurosportpark

10 August 2025 Friendly	Al-Fayha (Saudi Arabia)	1–2	(Belgium) Westerlo	Westerlo, Belgium
12:00 CEST	Smalling 87'	Report		Stadium: Het Kuipje

13 August 2025 Friendly	Al-Fayha (Saudi Arabia)	0–1	(Saudi Arabia) Al-Taawoun	Gorredijk, Netherlands
16:00 CEST		Report	Mandash 6'	Stadium: Sportpark De Ark

16 August 2025 Friendly	Al-Fayha (Saudi Arabia)	0–0	(Netherlands) Go Ahead Eagles U23	Zaltbommel, Netherlands
15:00 CEST		Report		Stadium: Eurosportpark

17 August 2025 Friendly	Al-Fayha (Saudi Arabia)	6–0	(Netherlands) Heracles Almelo	Zaltbommel, Netherlands
15:00 CEST	Al-Hussain; Sakala, Jason, Al-Jouei	Report		Stadium: Eurosportpark

23 August 2025 Friendly	Al-Fayha (Saudi Arabia)	0–4	(Saudi Arabia) Al-Hilal	Riyadh, Saudi Arabia
19:00 AST		Report	Milinković-Savić; Neves; Al-Harbi; Núñez	Stadium: Al-Hilal Club Stadium

== Competitions ==
=== Overview ===
Competition	Record							
Competition	Pld	W	D	L	GF	GA	GD	Win %
Pro League	18	5	5	8	19	32	−13	27.78
King's Cup	1	0	1	0	0	0	+0	0.00
Total	19	5	6	8	19	32	−13	26.32

Updated to match played 28 January 2026
Source: Competitions

=== Pro League ===
==== League table ====
Pos	Team	Pld	W	D	L	GF	GA	GD	Pts	Qualification or relegation
8	Neom	34	12	9	13	43	48	−5	45	Qualification for GFF Gulf Club Champions League group stage
9	Al-Hazem	34	11	9	14	38	57	−19	42	
10	Al-Fayha	34	10	8	16	41	54	−13	38	
11	Al-Fateh	34	9	10	15	41	55	−14	37	
12	Al-Khaleej	34	10	7	17	54	62	−8	37	

Source: SPL
Rules for classification: 1) Points; 2) Head-to-head points; 3) Head-to-head goal difference; 4) Total goal difference; 5) Total goals scored; 6) Fair-play points
(Note: Head-to-head record is used only after all the matches between the teams in question have been played).

==== Results summary ====
Overall								Home						Away					
Pld	W	D	L	GF	GA	GD	Pts	W	D	L	GF	GA	GD	W	D	L	GF	GA	GD
18	5	5	8	19	32	−13	20	3	4	2	10	10	0	2	1	6	9	22	−13

Last updated: 28 January 2026.
Source: Saudi Pro League

==== Results by round ====
Round	1	2	3	4	5	6	7	8	9	11	12	13	14	15	16	17	18	19	20	21	22	23	10	24	25	26	27	28	29	30	31	32	33	34
Ground	A	A	H	A	H	H	A	H	A	H	A	H	A	A	H	A	H	H	A	H	A	A	H	H	A	H	A	A	H	A	H	H	A	H
Result	W	L	D	W	D	L	L	W	L	D	L	L	D	L	D	L	W	W																
Position	7	10	10	9	10	10	10	9	10	10	11	13	11	12	12	13	12	11																

Updated to match(es) played on 30 January 2026. Source: Saudi Pro League
A = Away; H = Home; W = Win; D = Draw; L = Loss

==== Matches ====
All times are local, AST (UTC+3).

Win Draw Loss Postponed

30 August 2025 1	Al-Fateh	1–2	Al-Fayha	Al-Hasa
18:55	Sbaï (red card) 21'; Vargas (yellow card) 37'; Youssouf 45+12'; Al-Tambakti (yellow card) 87'	Report	Jason 15'; Al-Rammah (yellow card) 18' (yellow-red card) 28'; Semedo 45+4'	Stadium: Al-Fateh Club Stadium; Attendance: 5,617; Referee: Abdullah Al-Harbi

13 September 2025 2	Al-Khaleej	3–0	Al-Fayha	Dammam
18:25	King 5'; Hawsawi (yellow card) 45+1'; Kourbelis 64'; Fernandes 90+1'	Report	Bamsaud (yellow card) 25'; Sakala (yellow card) 47'	Stadium: Prince Mohamed bin Fahd Stadium; Attendance: 1,639; Referee: Abdullah Al-Owaidan

19 September 2025 3	Al-Fayha	0–0	Al-Shabab	Al Majma'ah
18:35	Ganvoula (yellow card) 35'; Semedo (yellow card) 57'; Al-Baqawi (yellow card) 90+4'	Report	Hoedt (yellow card) 5'; Al-Shuwayrikh (yellow card) 64'	Stadium: Al-Majma'ah Sports City Stadium; Attendance: 733; Referee: Sami Al-Jires

27 September 2025 4	Al-Najma	1–2	Al-Fayha	Buraidah
18:35	A. Al-Shammeri (yellow card) 43'; El Yamiq (yellow card) 71'; Samir 90+2'	Report	Al-Mutairi (yellow card) 45+5'; Semedo 75'; Bamsaud (yellow card) 81'; Ganvoula 88'	Stadium: King Abdullah Sports City; Attendance: 844; Referee: Ali Al-Qahtani

17 October 2025 5	Al-Fayha	1–1	Al-Ittihad	Al Majma'ah
18:05	Semedo (yellow card) 20'; Sakala 45'; Jason (yellow card) 47'	Report	Al-Mousa (yellow card) 42'; Al-Ghamdi 64'; Al-Julaydan (yellow card) 90+5'	Stadium: Al-Majma'ah Sports City Stadium; Attendance: 3,098; Referee: Majed Al-Shamrani

23 October 2025 6	Al-Fayha	1–2	Al-Taawoun	Al Majma'ah
18:00	Benzia (yellow card) 18'; Smalling 60'; Al-Khaibari (yellow card) 77'	Report	Fulgini 26'; Mahzari 39'; Flávio (yellow card) 45+4'; Al-Mufarrij (yellow card) 90'	Stadium: Al-Majma'ah Sports City Stadium; Attendance: 1,530; Referee: Abdullah Al-Owaidan

1 November 2025 7	Al-Nassr	2–1	Al-Fayha	Riyadh
20:30	Ronaldo 37', 90+14' (pen.); Brozović (yellow card) 43'; Félix (yellow card) 63'	Report	Jason 13'; Al-Baqawi (yellow card) 22'; Al-Harthi (yellow card) 28'	Stadium: Al-Awwal Park; Attendance: 16,242; Referee: Mohammed Al-Hoaish

7 November 2025 8	Al-Fayha	2–0	Al-Okhdood	Al Majma'ah
16:20	Ganvoula 61'; Sakala 70'	Report	Al-Rubaie (yellow card) 90+1'	Stadium: Al-Majma'ah Sports City Stadium; Attendance: 852; Referee: Shukri Al-Hanfoush

22 November 2025 9	Al-Ettifaq	3–2	Al-Fayha	Dammam
17:25	Dembélé 10', 27'; Wijnaldum 27'	Report	Al-Khaibari 65'; Benzia 82'	Stadium: EGO Stadium; Attendance: 2,992; Referee: Ahmed Al-Rumaikhani

25 December 2025 11	Al-Fayha	0–0	Al-Hazem	Al Majma'ah
17:50	Ganvoula (yellow card) 42'; Villanueva (yellow card) 74'	Report	Al-Rashed (yellow card) 17'; Tunkar (yellow card) 43'; Al-Dhuwayhi (yellow card) 63'	Stadium: Al-Majma'ah Sports City Stadium; Attendance: 647; Referee: Raed Al-Zahrani

30 December 2025 12	Al-Ahli	2–0	Al-Fayha	Jeddah
18:30	Toney 6'; Atangana (yellow card) 20'; Hawsawi (yellow card) 51'; Ibañez 64', (red card) 85'; Al-Muwallad (yellow card) 74'; Abu Al-Shamat (yellow card) 77'	Report	Al-Mutairi (yellow card) 15'	Stadium: Prince Abdullah Al-Faisal Sports City Stadium; Attendance: 4,259; Referee: Faisal Al-Blwi

3 January 2026 13	Al-Fayha	0–5	Al-Kholood	Al Majma'ah
17:55	Semedo (red card) 63'; Sakala (yellow card) 82'	Report	Maolida 5', 84'; Smalling 38' (o.g.); Enrique 44'; Bahebri 65', (yellow card) 85'; Al-Safri (yellow card) 82'	Stadium: Al-Majma'ah Sports City Stadium; Attendance: 494; Referee: Mohammed Abu Shaqarah

10 January 2026 14	Al-Riyadh	1–1	Al-Fayha	Riyadh
18:00	Hassoun (yellow card) 9'; Tozé (yellow card) 19'; Bayesh (yellow card) 87'; Barbet 90+7', (yellow card) 90+9'	Report	Villanueva 26'; Dahal (yellow card) 49'; Benzia (yellow card) 73'; Vrontis (yellow card) 77'	Stadium: Al-Awwal Park; Attendance: 329; Referee: Abdullah Zarban

14 January 2026 15	Al-Qadsiah	5–0	Al-Fayha	Dammam
17:45	Weigl (yellow card) 45'; Quiñones 47', 53', 61'; Nández (yellow card) 85'; Housa 87'; Retegui 90+3' (pen.)	Report	Al-Rashidi (yellow card) 56'	Stadium: Prince Mohamed bin Fahd Stadium; Attendance: 7,845; Referee: Sebastian Gishamer (Austria)

17 January 2026 16	Al-Fayha	1–1	Damac	Al Majma'ah
16:35	Semedo (yellow card) 16'; Sakala 26' (pen.); Jason (yellow card) 83'	Report	Rabea (yellow card) 24'; Al-Qahtani 41'; Al-Obaid (yellow card) 80'	Stadium: Al-Majma'ah Sports City Stadium; Attendance: 549; Referee: Ahmed Al-Rumaikhani

22 January 2026 17	Al-Hilal	4–1	Al-Fayha	Riyadh
20:30	Milinković-Savić 37'; Mosquera 45' (o.g.); Kanno 61'; Neves (yellow card) 90'; Leonardo 90'	Report	Sakala 14'; Al-Rammah (yellow card) 88'	Stadium: Kingdom Arena; Attendance: 17,920; Referee: Sergei Karasev (Russia)

25 January 2026 18	Al-Fayha	2–0	Al-Fateh	Al Majma'ah
20:30	Kaabi (yellow card) 38'; Villanueva (yellow card) 42'; Dahal 79'; Sakala 88'	Report	Al-Zubaidi (yellow card) 38'; Al-Anazi (yellow card) 67'	Stadium: Al-Majma'ah Sports City Stadium; Attendance: 424; Referee: Mohammed Abu Shaqarah

28 January 2026 19	Al-Fayha	3–1	Al-Khaleej	Al Majma'ah
20:30	Al-Sultan 18' (o.g.); Smalling 38'; Sakala 42'	Report	Schenkeveld (yellow card) 36'; Masouras 80'	Stadium: Al-Majma'ah Sports City Stadium; Attendance: 562; Referee: Ahmed Al-Rumaikhani

21 December 2025 10	Al-Fayha	v	Neom	Al Majma'ah
17:50				Stadium: Al-Majma'ah Sports City Stadium

=== King's Cup ===
All times are local, AST (UTC+3).

23 September 2025 Round of 32	Al-Zulfi	0–0 (a.e.t.) (4–3 p)	Al-Fayha	Al Zulfi
18:35	Al-Anzi (yellow card) 89'; Al-Mutairi (yellow card) 97'; S. Al-Saleh (yellow card) 114'	Report	Sakala (yellow card) 45'; Al-Hussain (yellow card) 110'; Jason (yellow card) 118'; Smalling (yellow card) 119'	Stadium: Al-Zulfi Club Stadium; Referee: Abdullah Zarban
	Penalties
	Medioub (penalty scored); Barry (penalty scored); Asiri (penalty missed); Al-Otaibi (penalty scored); Al-Mutairi (penalty missed); Omondi (penalty scored)		(penalty scored) Sakala; (penalty scored) Ganvoula; (penalty missed) Jason; (penalty missed) Al-Abdulmenem; (penalty scored) Bamsaud; (penalty missed) Al-Hussain

== Statistics ==
=== Appearances ===
Last updated on 28 January 2026.

No.	Pos	Nat	Player	Total		Pro League		King's Cup	
No.	Pos	Nat	Player	Apps	Goals	Apps	Goals	Apps	Goals
Goalkeepers
1	GK	(Saudi Arabia) KSA	Abdulraouf Al-Duqayl	0	0	0	0	0	0
13	GK	(Saudi Arabia) KSA	Sattam Al-Shammari	0	0	0	0	0	0
52	GK	(Panama) PAN	Orlando Mosquera	19	0	18	0	1	0
Defenders
2	DF	(Saudi Arabia) KSA	Mukhair Al-Rashidi	5	0	2+3	0	0	0
5	DF	(England) ENG	Chris Smalling	19	2	17+1	2	0+1	0
17	DF	(Venezuela) VEN	Mikel Villanueva	17	1	16	1	1	0
18	DF	(Saudi Arabia) KSA	Ahmed Bamsaud	19	0	18	0	0+1	0
21	DF	(Saudi Arabia) KSA	Ziyad Al-Sahafi	9	0	3+5	0	1	0
22	DF	(Saudi Arabia) KSA	Mohammed Al-Baqawi	18	0	17	0	1	0
47	DF	(Saudi Arabia) KSA	Mohammed Al-Dowaish	0	0	0	0	0	0
70	DF	(Saudi Arabia) KSA	Abdulrahman Al-Anazi	4	0	0+4	0	0	0
75	DF	(Saudi Arabia) KSA	Khalid Al-Rammah	7	0	1+5	0	1	0
Midfielders
6	MF	(Saudi Arabia) KSA	Rakan Kaabi	9	0	4+5	0	0	0
7	MF	(Saudi Arabia) KSA	Nawaf Al-Harthi	10	0	4+5	0	1	0
8	MF	(Algeria) ALG	Yassine Benzia	17	1	16	1	1	0
11	MF	(Saudi Arabia) KSA	Abdullah Al-Jouei	6	0	0+5	0	1	0
14	MF	(Saudi Arabia) KSA	Mansor Al-Beshe	12	0	7+5	0	0	0
19	MF	(Cyprus) CYP	Stylianos Vrontis	4	0	2+2	0	0	0
23	MF	(Spain) ESP	Jason	19	2	18	2	0+1	0
24	MF	(Saudi Arabia) KSA	Sattam Al-Rouqi	0	0	0	0	0	0
30	MF	(Guinea-Bissau) GBS	Alfa Semedo	17	2	16	2	1	0
41	MF	(Saudi Arabia) KSA	Ammar Al-Khaibari	6	1	0+5	1	0+1	0
55	MF	(Saudi Arabia) KSA	Ali Al-Hussain	5	0	2+2	0	0+1	0
72	MF	(Saudi Arabia) KSA	Sabri Dahal	9	1	5+4	1	0	0
77	MF	(Saudi Arabia) KSA	Rayan Al-Mutairi	15	0	9+6	0	0	0
Forwards
9	FW	(Saudi Arabia) KSA	Malek Al-Abdulmenem	7	0	0+6	0	0+1	0
10	FW	(Zambia) ZAM	Fashion Sakala	17	6	16	6	1	0
27	FW	(Saudi Arabia) KSA	Danyal Al Habeeb	1	0	0+1	0	0	0
35	FW	(Republic of the Congo) CGO	Silvère Ganvoula	14	2	7+6	2	1	0
59	FW	(The Gambia) GAM	Saikou Secka	1	0	0+1	0	0	0

=== Goalscorers ===
Rank	No.	Pos	Nat	Name	Pro League	King's Cup	Total
1	10	FW	(Zambia)	Fashion Sakala	6	0	6
2	5	DF	(England)	Chris Smalling	2	0	2
2	23	MF	(Spain)	Jason	2	0	2
2	30	MF	(Guinea-Bissau)	Alfa Semedo	2	0	2
2	35	FW	(Republic of the Congo)	Silvère Ganvoula	2	0	2
6	8	MF	(Algeria)	Yassine Benzia	1	0	1
6	17	DF	(Venezuela)	Mikel Villanueva	1	0	1
6	41	MF	(Saudi Arabia)	Ammar Al-Khaibari	1	0	1
6	72	MF	(Saudi Arabia)	Sabri Dahal	1	0	1
Own goal					1	0	1
Total					19	0	19

Last Updated: 28 January 2026

=== Assists ===
Rank	No.	Pos	Nat	Name	Pro League	King's Cup	Total
1	23	MF	(Spain)	Jason	4	0	4
2	8	MF	(Algeria)	Yassine Benzia	2	0	2
2	10	FW	(Zambia)	Fashion Sakala	2	0	2
2	30	MF	(Guinea-Bissau)	Alfa Semedo	2	0	2
5	9	FW	(Saudi Arabia)	Malek Al-Abdulmenem	1	0	1
5	22	DF	(Saudi Arabia)	Mohammed Al-Baqawi	1	0	1
5	72	MF	(Saudi Arabia)	Sabri Dahal	1	0	1
Total					13	0	13

Last Updated: 28 January 2026

=== Clean sheets ===
Rank	No.	Pos	Nat	Name	Pro League	King Cup	Total
1	52	GK	(Panama)	Orlando Mosquera	4	1	5
Total					4	1	5

Last Updated: 25 January 2026
