= 2024–25 Al-Fayha FC season =

Al-Fayha
2024–25 season
- President: Tawfiq Al-Modaiheem
- Manager: Christos Kontis (until 3 December); Pedro Emanuel (from 10 December)
- Stadium: Al Majma'ah Sports City
- Pro League: 13th
- King's Cup: Quarter-finals (knocked out by Al-Shabab)
- Top goalscorer: League: Renzo López; Fashion Sakala (8 each); All: Renzo López (11 goals)
- Highest home attendance: 4,195 v Al-Nassr; 27 August 2024; Saudi Pro League
- Lowest home attendance: 127 v Al-Arabi; 29 October 2024; King's Cup
- Average home league attendance: 1,443
- All statistics correct as of 26 May 2025.

The 2024–25 season was Al-Fayha's 71st year in their existence and their seventh non-consecutive season in the Pro League. The club participated in the Pro League and the King Cup.

The season covers the period from 1 July 2024 to 30 June 2025.

== Players ==
=== Squad information ===
As of 1 February 2025

Note: Flags indicate national team as defined under FIFA eligibility rules; some limited exceptions apply. Players may hold more than one non-FIFA nationality.

No.	Pos.	Nation	Player
1	GK	KSA	Abdulraouf Al-Duqayl
2	DF	KSA	Mukhair Al-Rashidi
3	DF	BRA	Rangel
4	DF	KSA	Sami Al-Khaibari (captain)
5	DF	ENG	Chris Smalling
7	FW	NGR	Henry Onyekuru
8	MF	ESP	Alejandro Pozuelo
9	FW	URU	Renzo López
10	FW	ZAM	Fashion Sakala
13	MF	BIH	Gojko Cimirot
14	MF	KSA	Mansor Al-Beshe
15	MF	KSA	Abdulhadi Al-Harajin
20	MF	UZB	Otabek Shukurov
21	DF	KSA	Ziyad Al-Sahafi
22	DF	KSA	Mohammed Al-Baqawi

No.	Pos.	Nation	Player
23	DF	BRA	Gabriel Vareta (on loan from Palmeiras)
24	MF	KSA	Sattam Al-Rouqi
25	DF	KSA	Faris Abdi
27	FW	KSA	Redha Al-Abdullah (on loan from Al-Ettifaq)
29	MF	KSA	Nawaf Al-Harthi
33	GK	KSA	Sattam Al-Shammari
34	GK	KSA	Osama Al-Thumairy
46	MF	KSA	Osama Al-Turki
47	DF	KSA	Mohammed Al-Dowaish
52	GK	PAN	Orlando Mosquera
55	MF	KSA	Ali Al-Hussain
66	MF	KSA	Rakan Kaabi
75	DF	KSA	Khalid Al-Rammah
77	MF	KSA	Khalid Kaabi
99	FW	KSA	Malek Al-Abdulmenem

=== Out on loan ===
Note: Flags indicate national team as defined under FIFA eligibility rules; some limited exceptions apply. Players may hold more than one non-FIFA nationality.

No. / Pos. / Nation / Player; 70 / MF / KSA / Abdulrahman Al-Enezi (at Al-Orobah until 30 June 2025)	No. / Pos. / Nation / Player; — / DF / KSA / Muteb Al-Khaldi (at Al-Ain until 30 June 2025)

== Transfers and loans ==
=== Transfers in ===
Entry date	Position	No.	Player	From club	Fee	Ref.
30 June 2024	DF	5	(Saudi Arabia) Naif Almas	(Saudi Arabia) Al-Orobah	End of loan	
30 June 2024	DF	14	(Saudi Arabia) Sultan Al-Harbi	(Saudi Arabia) Al-Qaisumah	End of loan	
30 June 2024	DF	21	(Saudi Arabia) Muteb Al-Khaldi	(Saudi Arabia) Al-Taraji	End of loan	
1 July 2024	MF	15	(Saudi Arabia) Abdulhadi Al-Harajin	(Saudi Arabia) Al-Riyadh	Free	
2 July 2024	MF	14	(Saudi Arabia) Mansor Al-Beshe	(Saudi Arabia) Al-Raed	Free	
3 July 2024	GK	33	(Saudi Arabia) Sattam Al-Shammari	(Saudi Arabia) Al-Shabab	Free	
5 July 2024	DF	25	(Saudi Arabia) Faris Abdi	(Saudi Arabia) Al-Qadsiah	Free	
26 August 2024	GK	52	(Panama) Orlando Mosquera	(Israel) Maccabi Tel Aviv	Free	
26 August 2024	MF	8	(Spain) Alejandro Pozuelo	(United Arab Emirates) Al-Jazira	Free	
2 September 2024	DF	5	(England) Chris Smalling	(Italy) Roma	$6,700,000	
2 September 2024	MF	20	(Uzbekistan) Otabek Shukurov	(Turkey) Kayserispor	$444,000	
2 September 2024	FW	9	(Uruguay) Renzo López	(Ecuador) Independiente del Valle	Free	
16 September 2024	DF	3	(Brazil) Rangel	(Brazil) Internacional	Free	
29 January 2025	DF	21	(Saudi Arabia) Ziyad Al-Sahafi	(Saudi Arabia) Al-Riyadh	Free	
31 January 2025	MF	24	(Saudi Arabia) Sattam Al-Rouqi	(Saudi Arabia) Al-Taawoun	Free	

=== Loans in ===
Start date	End date	Position	No.	Player	From club	Fee	Ref.
19 August 2024	End of season	FW	27	(Saudi Arabia) Redha Al-Abdullah	(Saudi Arabia) Al-Ettifaq	None	
2 September 2024	29 January 2025	MF	11	(Venezuela) Aldry Contreras	(Venezuela) Angostura	None	
31 January 2025	End of season	DF	23	(Brazil) Gabriel Vareta	(Brazil) Palmeiras	None	

=== Transfers out ===
Exit date	Position	No.	Player	To club	Fee	Ref.
30 June 2024	DF	3	(Ivory Coast) Ghislain Konan	(Saudi Arabia) Al-Nassr	End of loan	
30 June 2024	DF	12	(Saudi Arabia) Yousef Haqawi	(Saudi Arabia) Al-Nassr	End of loan	
30 June 2024	MF	77	(Morocco) Abdelhamid Sabiri	(Italy) Fiorentina	End of loan	
1 July 2024	MF	27	(Saudi Arabia) Sultan Mandash	(Saudi Arabia) Al-Taawoun	Free	
1 July 2024	MF	37	(Brazil) Ricardo Ryller	(Brazil) Vitória	Free	
1 July 2024	FW	9	(Nigeria) Anthony Nwakaeme	(Turkey) Trabzonspor	Free	
2 July 2024	DF	80	(Saudi Arabia) Osama Al-Khalaf	(Saudi Arabia) Neom	Free	
14 July 2024	DF	33	(Saudi Arabia) Hussein Al-Shuwaish	(Saudi Arabia) Al-Orobah	Free	
23 July 2024	MF	8	(Saudi Arabia) Abdulrahman Al-Safri	(Saudi Arabia) Al-Kholood	Free	
6 August 2024	DF	–	(Saudi Arabia) Hattan Ahmed	(Saudi Arabia) Al-Rayyan	Free	
6 August 2024	MF	–	(Saudi Arabia) Abdulrahman Hindi	(Saudi Arabia) Jerash	Free	
18 August 2024	FW	19	(Saudi Arabia) Mohammed Majrashi	(Saudi Arabia) Al-Faisaly	Free	
22 August 2024	FW	49	(Saudi Arabia) Ali Al Jubaya	(Saudi Arabia) Al-Jabalain	Free	
2 September 2024	DF	98	(Saudi Arabia) Muhannad Al-Qaydhi	(Saudi Arabia) Al-Okhdood	Free	
13 September 2024	FW	45	(Saudi Arabia) Sattam Al-Lehiyani	(Saudi Arabia) Al-Jubail	Free	
30 January 2025	MF	6	(Saudi Arabia) Saud Zidan	(Saudi Arabia) Al-Riyadh	Free	

=== Loans out ===
Start date	End date	Position	No.	Player	To club	Fee	Ref.
29 July 2024	End of season	MF	70	(Saudi Arabia) Abdulrahman Al-Enezi	(Saudi Arabia) Al-Orobah	None	
20 August 2024	End of season	DF	21	(Saudi Arabia) Muteb Al-Khaldi	(Saudi Arabia) Al-Ain	None	

== Pre-season and friendlies ==
21 July 2024 Friendly	Al-Fayha (Saudi Arabia)	0–1	(Croatia) Slaven Belupo	Kematen in Tirol, Austria
17:00 CEST		Report	Štrkalj 48'	Stadium: Melach Road

24 July 2024 Friendly	Al-Fayha (Saudi Arabia)	4–0	(Austria) Reichenau	Jenbach, Austria
19:00 CEST	Sakala 26', 62'; Al-Beshe 70'; Al-Lehiyani 73'	Report		Stadium: Stadion Jenbach

28 July 2024 Friendly	Al-Fayha (Saudi Arabia)	1–1	(Cyprus) Aris Limassol	Waidring, Austria
16:00 CEST	Sakala 64'	Report	Sawo 34'	Stadium: Waldstadion Waidring

2 August 2024 Friendly	Al-Fayha (Saudi Arabia)	0–1	(Turkey) Konyaspor	Walchsee, Austria
16:00 CEST		Report	Prip 49'	Stadium: Ramsbachstadion Walchsee

15 August 2024 Friendly	Al-Fayha (Saudi Arabia)	0–2	(Saudi Arabia) Al-Shabab	Riyadh, Saudi Arabia
19:30 AST		Report	Hamdallah 36'; Carrasco 37'	Stadium: Al-Shabab Club Stadium

== Competitions ==
=== Overview ===
Competition	Record							
Competition	Pld	W	D	L	GF	GA	GD	Win %
Pro League	34	8	12	14	27	49	−22	23.53
King Cup	3	2	0	1	6	2	+4	66.67
Total	37	10	12	15	33	51	−18	27.03

Updated to match played 26 May 2025
Source: Competitions

=== Pro League ===
==== League table ====
Pos	Team	Pld	W	D	L	GF	GA	GD	Pts
11	Al-Riyadh	34	10	8	16	37	52	−15	38
12	Al-Khaleej	34	10	7	17	40	57	−17	37
13	Al-Fayha	34	8	12	14	27	49	−22	36
14	Damac	34	9	8	17	37	50	−13	35
15	Al-Okhdood	34	9	7	18	33	56	−23	34

Source: SPL
Rules for classification: 1) Points; 2) Head-to-head points; 3) Head-to-head goal difference; 4) Total goal difference; 5) Total goals scored; 6) Fair-play points
(Note: Head-to-head record is used only after all the matches between the teams in question have been played).

==== Results summary ====
Overall								Home						Away					
Pld	W	D	L	GF	GA	GD	Pts	W	D	L	GF	GA	GD	W	D	L	GF	GA	GD
34	8	12	14	27	49	−22	36	5	6	6	13	20	−7	3	6	8	14	29	−15

Last updated: 26 May 2025.
Source: Saudi Pro League

==== Results by round ====
Round	1	2	3	4	5	6	7	8	9	10	11	12	13	14	15	16	17	18	19	20	21	22	23	24	25	26	27	28	29	30	31	32	33	34
Ground	A	H	H	A	H	A	A	H	A	A	H	H	A	H	A	H	A	H	A	A	H	A	H	H	A	H	H	A	A	H	A	H	A	H
Result	L	L	L	D	W	D	L	D	D	L	L	L	D	D	W	W	L	D	L	W	D	D	D	L	W	D	W	L	D	W	L	W	L	L
Position	12	17	18	18	15	14	16	16	16	16	17	17	17	17	16	14	14	13	14	14	13	14	14	14	14	13	12	14	14	12	14	11	13	13

Updated to match(es) played on 26 May 2025. Source: Saudi Pro League
A = Away; H = Home; W = Win; D = Draw; L = Loss

==== Matches ====
All times are local, AST (UTC+3).

Win Draw Loss Postponed

22 August 2024 1	Al-Taawoun	1–0	Al-Fayha	Buraidah
19:10	Al-Shoeil (red card) 81'; Adam 90+5', (yellow card) 90+6'	Report	Al-Rashidi (yellow card) 28'; Abdi (yellow card) 45'; Al-Dowaish (yellow card) 66'	Stadium: Al-Taawoun Club Stadium; Attendance: 1,606; Referee: Abdullah Al-Shehri

27 August 2024 2	Al-Fayha	1–4	Al-Nassr	Buraidah
21:00	R. Kaabi (yellow card) 18'; Al-Hussain (yellow card) 30'; Sakala 86'	Report	Talisca 5', 90+5'; Ronaldo 45+10'; Brozović 85'	Stadium: King Abdullah Sports City; Attendance: 4,195; Referee: Majed Al-Shamrani

14 September 2024 3	Al-Fayha	0–5	Al-Raed	Al Majma'ah
18:45	R. Kaabi (yellow card) 17'; Smalling (red card) 55'	Report	Smalling 6' (o.g.); Fouzair 17'; El Berkaoui 45+6', 60'; Al-Amri 66'; Al-Jayzani (yellow card) 73'	Stadium: Al Majma'ah Sports City; Attendance: 794; Referee: Sultan Okairy

20 September 2024 4	Al-Khaleej	0–0	Al-Fayha	Dammam
18:15	Al-Samiri (yellow card) 45+6'	Report	López (yellow card) 22'; Abdi (yellow card) 85'; Shukurov (yellow card) 90+1'	Stadium: Prince Mohamed bin Fahd Stadium; Attendance: 1,073; Referee: Abdullah Al-Kharboush

29 September 2024 5	Al-Fayha	2–0	Al-Riyadh	Al Majma'ah
18:30	Abdi (yellow card) 19'; Sakala 20'; López 35'; Shukurov (yellow card) 75'	Report	Assiri (yellow card) 19'; Al-Menhali (yellow card) 26'	Stadium: Al Majma'ah Sports City; Attendance: 390; Referee: Ahmed Al-Rumaikhani

3 October 2024 6	Al-Wehda	2–2	Al-Fayha	Mecca
21:00	Al-Alaeli 4'; Al-Hejji (yellow card) 55'; Ighalo 82'; Crețu (yellow card) 90+14'; Al-Salem (yellow card) 90+16'	Report	Sakala (yellow card) 50', (goal) 90+14'; Pozuelo 74'; Al-Beshe (yellow card) 85'; Al-Duqayl (yellow card) 90+3'	Stadium: King Abdulaziz Sports City; Attendance: 465; Referee: Mohammed Al-Daqqash

18 October 2024 7	Al-Hilal	3–0	Al-Fayha	Riyadh
18:00	Leonardo 5'; S. Al-Dawsari 65'; Al-Qahtani 81'	Report	Abdi (yellow card) 41'; Shukurov (yellow card) 58'	Stadium: Kingdom Arena; Attendance: 15,570; Referee: Radu Petrescu (Romania)

26 October 2024 8	Al-Fayha	1–1	Al-Ettifaq	Al Majma'ah
18:00	López 28'; Al-Harajin (yellow card) 69'	Report	Al-Olayan (yellow card) 24'; Al-Malki (yellow card) 48'; Medrán 53'; Madu (yellow card) 90+1'	Stadium: Al Majma'ah Sports City; Attendance: 952; Referee: Mohammed Abu Shaqarah

2 November 2024 9	Al-Fateh	2–2	Al-Fayha	Al-Hasa
17:35	Zelarayán 54'	Report	Rangel (yellow card) 41'; Al-Rashidi (yellow card) 45+2'; K. Kaabi 45+4'; Abdi (yellow card) 60'	Stadium: Al-Fateh Club Stadium; Attendance: 3,769; Referee: Ahmed Al-Rumaikhani

7 November 2024 10	Al-Qadsiah	2–0	Al-Fayha	Dammam
17:30	Al-Ammar 4'; Nández (yellow card) 31'; Aubameyang 44' (pen.); Hazazi (yellow card) 75'	Report	Al-Baqawi (yellow card) 29'; Cimirot (yellow card) 45+1'; Smalling (yellow card) 58'; Pozuelo (yellow card) 76'; Al-Hussain (yellow card) 90'; Shukurov (yellow card) 90+5'	Stadium: Prince Mohamed bin Fahd Stadium; Attendance: 4,045; Referee: Cláudio Pereira (Portugal)

22 November 2024 11	Al-Fayha	0–1	Al-Ahli	Buraidah
17:50	Sakala (yellow card) 65'	Report	Mahrez 21' (pen.); Demiral (yellow card) 52'; Al-Hurayji (yellow card) 54'	Stadium: King Abdullah Sports City; Attendance: 999; Referee: Mohammed Al-Hoaish

28 November 2024 12	Al-Fayha	0–1	Al-Orobah	Al Majma'ah
17:45	Al-Khaibari (yellow card) 6'; López (red card) 90+2'	Report	Kandouss (yellow card) 48'; I. Al-Zubaidi (yellow card) 79'; Boateng 90', (yellow card) 90+1'	Stadium: Al Majma'ah Sports City; Attendance: 404; Referee: Abdulrahman Al-Sultan

5 December 2024 13	Damac	2–2	Al-Fayha	Khamis Mushait
18:10	Nkoudou 6' (pen.); Kamano 67'; Abdullah (red card) 78'; Al-Khaibari (yellow card) 90+2'	Report	Al-Rashidi (yellow card) 3'; Cimirot (yellow card) 44'; Al-Baqawi (yellow card) 50'; Sakala 58'; Pozuelo 70'; Al-Duqayl (yellow card) 90+8'	Stadium: Damac Club Stadium; Attendance: 2,814; Referee: Raed Al-Zahrani

11 January 2025 14	Al-Fayha	1–1	Al-Ittihad	Buraidah
20:00	López (yellow card) 16'; Abdi (yellow card) 32'; Shukurov (yellow card) 48'; Sakala 90+1'	Report	Al-Nashri (yellow card) 20'; Al-Sqoor 90+3'	Stadium: King Abdullah Sports City; Attendance: 2,878; Referee: Khalid Al-Teris

16 January 2025 15	Al-Okhdood	1–2	Al-Fayha	Najran
16:55	Khamis (yellow card) 18'; Musona 45+6' (pen.); Lowe (yellow card) 75'	Report	Pozuelo 34'; López (yellow card) 36'; Sakala 87' (pen.); Mosquera (yellow card) 90+2'	Stadium: Prince Hathloul bin Abdulaziz Sports City; Attendance: 986; Referee: Ahmed Al-Rumaikhani

20 January 2025 16	Al-Fayha	1–0	Al-Kholood	Al Majma'ah
18:10	Smalling (yellow card) 48'; Pozuelo 53'; Al-Beshe (yellow card) 60'; Shukurov (yellow card) 76'	Report		Stadium: Al Majma'ah Sports City; Attendance: 1,026; Referee: Faisal Al-Blwi

27 January 2025 17	Al-Shabab	2–1	Al-Fayha	Riyadh
18:10	Hamdallah 34', 90+6' (pen.); Bonaventura (yellow card) 90+1'	Report	Al-Baqawi (yellow card) 45+1'; López (yellow card) 51', (goal) 57'; Mosquera (yellow card) 90+6'; Pozuelo (yellow card) 90+6'; Al-Khaibari (yellow card) 90+10'	Stadium: Al-Shabab Club Stadium; Attendance: 2,848; Referee: Mohammed Al-Ismail

31 January 2025 18	Al-Fayha	0–0	Al-Taawoun	Al Majma'ah
16:45	Smalling (yellow card) 38'; Sakala (yellow card) 89'	Report	Girotto (yellow card) 22'	Stadium: Al Majma'ah Sports City; Attendance: 1,042; Referee: Fareeh Al-Jaloud

7 February 2025 19	Al-Nassr	3–0	Al-Fayha	Riyadh
18:20	Durán 22', 72'; Boushal (yellow card) 51'; Mané (yellow card) 54'; Brozović (yellow card) 67'; Ronaldo 74'	Report	Al-Sahafi (yellow card) 35'	Stadium: Al-Awwal Park; Attendance: 20,207; Referee: Nikola Dabanović (Montenegro)

15 February 2025 20	Al-Raed	0–2	Al-Fayha	Buraidah
18:30	Al-Rajeh (yellow card) 32'	Report	Al-Beshe (yellow card) 12'; Al-Abdulmenem (yellow card) 45+3'; Sakala 58' (pen.); Abdi 61'; Onyekuru (yellow card) 70'; Shukurov (yellow card) 90+13'	Stadium: King Abdullah Sports City; Attendance: 1,002; Referee: Khalid Al-Turais

20 February 2025 21	Al-Fayha	0–0	Al-Khaleej	Al Majma'ah
18:30	Abdi (yellow card) 24'; Sakala (yellow card) 40'	Report	Tisserand (yellow card) 42'	Stadium: Al Majma'ah Sports City; Attendance: 1,606; Referee: Shukri Al-Hanfoush

26 February 2025 22	Al-Riyadh	0–0	Al-Fayha	Riyadh
18:30	Al-Nowaiqi (yellow card) 42'; Konaté (yellow card) 90+3'	Report	Al-Sahafi (yellow card) 40'	Stadium: Prince Faisal bin Fahd Sports City Stadium; Attendance: 148; Referee: Ahmed Al-Rumaikhani

1 March 2025 23	Al-Fayha	0–0	Al-Wehda	Al Majma'ah
22:00		Report	Goodwin (yellow card) 60'; Al-Najei (yellow card) 83'	Stadium: Al Majma'ah Sports City; Attendance: 575; Referee: Abdullah Al-Shehri

7 March 2025 24	Al-Fayha	0–2	Al-Hilal	Buraidah
22:00	Al-Rashidi (yellow card) 7'; Vareta (yellow card) 82'	Report	Kanno 18'; Mitrović 89'	Stadium: King Abdullah Sports City; Attendance: 4,133; Referee: Bruno Arleu de Araújo (Brazil)

15 March 2025 25	Al-Ettifaq	0–2	Al-Fayha	Dammam
22:00	Al-Khateeb (yellow card) 14'; Escobar (yellow card) 46'; Costa (yellow card) 65'	Report	Shukurov (yellow card) 26'; Smalling 45+1'; Abdi (yellow card) 53'; Cimirot (yellow card) 61'; Costa 63' (o.g.)	Stadium: EGO Stadium; Attendance: 4,121; Referee: Abdulsamad Bakri

6 April 2025 26	Al-Fayha	1–1	Al-Fateh	Al Majma'ah
17:25	López 64', (yellow card) 72'	Report	Sbaï 28'; Al-Othman (yellow card) 90+6'	Stadium: Al Majma'ah Sports City; Attendance: 798; Referee: Ahmed Al-Rumaikhani

12 April 2025 27	Al-Fayha	2–1	Al-Qadsiah	Buraidah
19:00	López 33', 58'; Vareta (yellow card) 45+2'	Report	Quiñones 90+2' (pen.)	Stadium: King Abdullah Sports City; Attendance: 589; Referee: Jesús Valenzuela (Venezuela)

18 April 2025 28	Al-Ahli	5–0	Al-Fayha	Jeddah
19:20	Ibañez 17', 37'; Al-Johani (yellow card) 27'; Toney 45+3', 68' (pen.); Mahrez 82'; Al-Buraikan (yellow card) 90+3'	Report	Vareta (yellow card) 43'; Mosquera (red card) 48'; Al-Baqawi (yellow card) 62'	Stadium: Prince Abdullah Al-Faisal Sports City; Attendance: 7,446; Referee: Ivan Kružliak (Slovakia)

24 April 2025 29	Al-Orobah	2–2	Al-Fayha	Sakakah
19:30	Al Somah 11' (pen.); F. Al-Zubaidi 18', (yellow card) 44'; R. Al-Ruwaili (yellow card) 82'; Al-Torais (yellow card) 90+1'; Al-Khalaf (yellow card) 90+3'	Report	Al-Sahafi (yellow card) 45'; K. Kaabi 61'; Abdi (yellow card) 90+4'; López 90+6'	Stadium: Al Jouf University Stadium; Attendance: 556; Referee: Abdullah Al-Kharbosh

2 May 2025 30	Al-Fayha	2–1	Damac	Al Majma'ah
19:05	K. Kaabi (yellow card) 45'; Al-Sahafi 47'; Al-Anazi 51' (o.g.); Al-Baqawi (yellow card) 53'; Shukurov (yellow card) 71'; Sakala (yellow card) 78'	Report	Stanciu 40'; Al-Khaibari (yellow card) 43'; Al-Rashidi (yellow card) 74'	Stadium: Al Majma'ah Sports City; Attendance: 1,910; Referee: Mohammed Al-Ismail

11 May 2025 31	Al-Ittihad	3–0	Al-Fayha	Jeddah
21:00	Benzema 24', 54'; Al-Baqawi 75' (o.g.)	Report	Al-Harajin (yellow card) 90+1'	Stadium: Prince Abdullah Al-Faisal Sports City; Attendance: 22,117; Referee: Nikola Dabanović (Montenegro)

17 May 2025 32	Al-Fayha	2–0	Al-Okhdood	Al Majma'ah
19:15	Al-Rashidi (yellow card) 70'; López 87'; Sakala 90+2'	Report	Al-Rubaie (yellow card) 57'	Stadium: Al Majma'ah Sports City; Attendance: 1,833; Referee: Sergey Ivanov (Russia)

21 May 2025 33	Al-Kholood	2–0	Al-Fayha	Ar Rass
19:25	Al-Hammami 45+1'; Dieng 82'	Report	Vareta (yellow card) 45+4'; Al-Rashidi (yellow card) 61'; Shukurov (yellow card) 84'	Stadium: Al-Hazem Club Stadium; Attendance: 3,636; Referee: Mohammed Al-Hoaish

26 May 2025 34	Al-Fayha	0–2	Al-Shabab	Al Majma'ah
21:00	López (yellow card) 28'; Al-Rashidi (yellow card) 66'	Report	Bonaventura 9'; Guanca 85'; Harboush (yellow card) 90+3'	Stadium: Al Majma'ah Sports City; Attendance: 407; Referee: Abdullah Zarban

=== King's Cup ===
All times are local, AST (UTC+3).

23 September 2024 Round of 32	Al-Fayha	4–0	Al-Batin	Al Majma'ah
18:30	López 30', 68'; Pozuelo 36'; Al-Harthi 47'; Shukurov (yellow card) 55'	Report	Adams (yellow card) 20'; Al-Sehaimi (yellow card) 51'; Al-Omair (yellow card) 80'; Al-Khathlan (yellow card) 90+2'	Stadium: Al Majma'ah Sports City; Referee: Mohammed Al-Beredi

29 October 2024 Round of 16	Al-Fayha	1–0	Al-Arabi	Al Majma'ah
20:30	López 42'; Al-Beshe (yellow card) 58'	Report	Abo Yabes (yellow card) 45+2'; Al-Bakhit (yellow card) 81'; Al-Mohanna (yellow card) 90'	Stadium: Al Majma'ah Sports City; Attendance: 127; Referee: Mohammed Al-Beredi

6 January 2025 Quarter-finals	Al-Shabab	2–1	Al-Fayha	Riyadh
18:00	Podence 2'; Hamdallah 26'; Al-Sharari (yellow card) 55'	Report	Shukurov (yellow card) 51'; Kaabi (yellow card) 53'; Abdi (yellow card) 73'; Al-Rashidi 88'	Stadium: Al-Shabab Club Stadium; Attendance: 4,586; Referee: Sami Al-Jires

== Statistics ==
=== Appearances ===
Last updated on 26 May 2025.

No.	Pos	Nat	Player	Total		Pro League		King's Cup	
No.	Pos	Nat	Player	Apps	Goals	Apps	Goals	Apps	Goals
Goalkeepers
1	GK	(Saudi Arabia) KSA	Abdulraouf Al-Duqayl	6	0	4+1	0	1	0
33	GK	(Saudi Arabia) KSA	Sattam Al-Shammari	0	0	0	0	0	0
52	GK	(Panama) PAN	Orlando Mosquera	32	0	30	0	2	0
Defenders
2	DF	(Saudi Arabia) KSA	Mukhair Al-Rashidi	34	1	25+6	0	2+1	1
3	DF	(Brazil) BRA	Rangel	13	0	4+7	0	2	0
4	DF	(Saudi Arabia) KSA	Sami Al-Khaibari	23	0	21+1	0	1	0
5	DF	(England) ENG	Chris Smalling	32	1	30	1	2	0
21	DF	(Saudi Arabia) KSA	Ziyad Al-Sahafi	10	1	7+3	1	0	0
22	DF	(Saudi Arabia) KSA	Mohammed Al-Baqawi	30	0	26+2	0	2	0
23	DF	(Brazil) BRA	Gabriel Vareta	12	0	8+4	0	0	0
25	DF	(Saudi Arabia) KSA	Faris Abdi	33	1	28+3	1	2	0
47	DF	(Saudi Arabia) KSA	Mohammed Al-Dowaish	9	0	4+3	0	1+1	0
75	DF	(Saudi Arabia) KSA	Khalid Al-Rammah	7	0	3+3	0	0+1	0
Midfielders
8	MF	(Spain) ESP	Alejandro Pozuelo	32	5	26+4	4	2	1
13	MF	(Bosnia and Herzegovina) BIH	Gojko Cimirot	27	0	15+10	0	1+1	0
14	MF	(Saudi Arabia) KSA	Mansor Al-Beshe	30	0	20+7	0	1+2	0
15	MF	(Saudi Arabia) KSA	Abdulhadi Al-Harajin	19	0	2+14	0	1+2	0
20	MF	(Uzbekistan) UZB	Otabek Shukurov	30	0	27+1	0	2	0
24	MF	(Saudi Arabia) KSA	Sattam Al-Rouqi	8	0	0+8	0	0	0
29	MF	(Saudi Arabia) KSA	Nawaf Al-Harthi	29	1	12+14	0	2+1	1
46	MF	(Saudi Arabia) KSA	Osama Al-Turki	0	0	0	0	0	0
55	MF	(Saudi Arabia) KSA	Ali Al-Hussain	5	0	2+3	0	0	0
66	MF	(Saudi Arabia) KSA	Rakan Kaabi	17	0	8+6	0	2+1	0
77	MF	(Saudi Arabia) KSA	Khalid Kaabi	23	2	9+12	2	2	0
Forwards
7	FW	(Nigeria) NGR	Henry Onyekuru	4	0	2+2	0	0	0
9	FW	(Uruguay) URU	Renzo López	31	11	29	8	2	3
10	FW	(Zambia) ZAM	Fashion Sakala	34	8	31	8	3	0
27	FW	(Saudi Arabia) KSA	Redha Al-Abdullah	2	0	0+2	0	0	0
99	FW	(Saudi Arabia) KSA	Malek Al-Abdulmenem	15	0	1+11	0	0+3	0
Player who made an appearance this season but have left the club
6	MF	(Saudi Arabia) KSA	Saud Zidan	1	0	0	0	0+1	0
11	MF	(Venezuela) VEN	Aldry Contreras	4	0	0+3	0	0+1	0

=== Goalscorers ===
Rank	No.	Pos	Nat	Name	Pro League	King's Cup	Total
1	9	FW	(Uruguay)	Renzo López	8	3	11
2	10	FW	(Zambia)	Fashion Sakala	8	0	8
3	8	MF	(Spain)	Alejandro Pozuelo	4	1	5
4	77	MF	(Saudi Arabia)	Khalid Kaabi	2	0	2
5	4	DF	(Saudi Arabia)	Mukhair Al-Rashidi	0	1	1
5	5	DF	(England)	Chris Smalling	1	0	1
5	21	DF	(Saudi Arabia)	Ziyad Al-Sahafi	1	0	1
5	25	DF	(Saudi Arabia)	Faris Abdi	1	0	1
5	29	MF	(Saudi Arabia)	Nawaf Al-Harthi	0	1	1
Own goal					2	0	2
Total					27	6	33

Last Updated: 17 May 2025

=== Assists ===
Rank	No.	Pos	Nat	Name	Pro League	King's Cup	Total
1	10	FW	(Zambia)	Fashion Sakala	4	1	5
2	8	MF	(Spain)	Alejandro Pozuelo	4	0	4
3	9	FW	(Uruguay)	Renzo López	1	1	2
3	14	MF	(Saudi Arabia)	Mansor Al-Beshe	1	1	2
3	20	MF	(Uzbekistan)	Otabek Shukurov	1	1	2
3	22	DF	(Saudi Arabia)	Mohammed Al-Baqawi	2	0	2
3	29	MF	(Saudi Arabia)	Nawaf Al-Harthi	2	0	2
8	13	MF	(Bosnia and Herzegovina)	Gojko Cimirot	1	0	1
8	15	MF	(Saudi Arabia)	Abdulhadi Al-Harajin	1	0	1
8	24	MF	(Saudi Arabia)	Sattam Al-Rouqi	1	0	1
8	25	DF	(Saudi Arabia)	Faris Abdi	1	0	1
8	52	GK	(Panama)	Orlando Mosquera	1	0	1
8	77	MF	(Saudi Arabia)	Khalid Kaabi	0	1	1
Total					20	5	25

Last Updated: 17 May 2025

=== Clean sheets ===
Rank	No.	Pos	Nat	Name	Pro League	King's Cup	Total
1	52	GK	(Panama)	Orlando Mosquera	10	1	11
2	1	GK	(Saudi Arabia)	Abdulraouf Al-Duqayl	0	1	1
Total					10	2	12

Last Updated: 17 May 2025
