= 2017–18 Manchester United F.C. season =

English football club season

Manchester United
2017–18 season
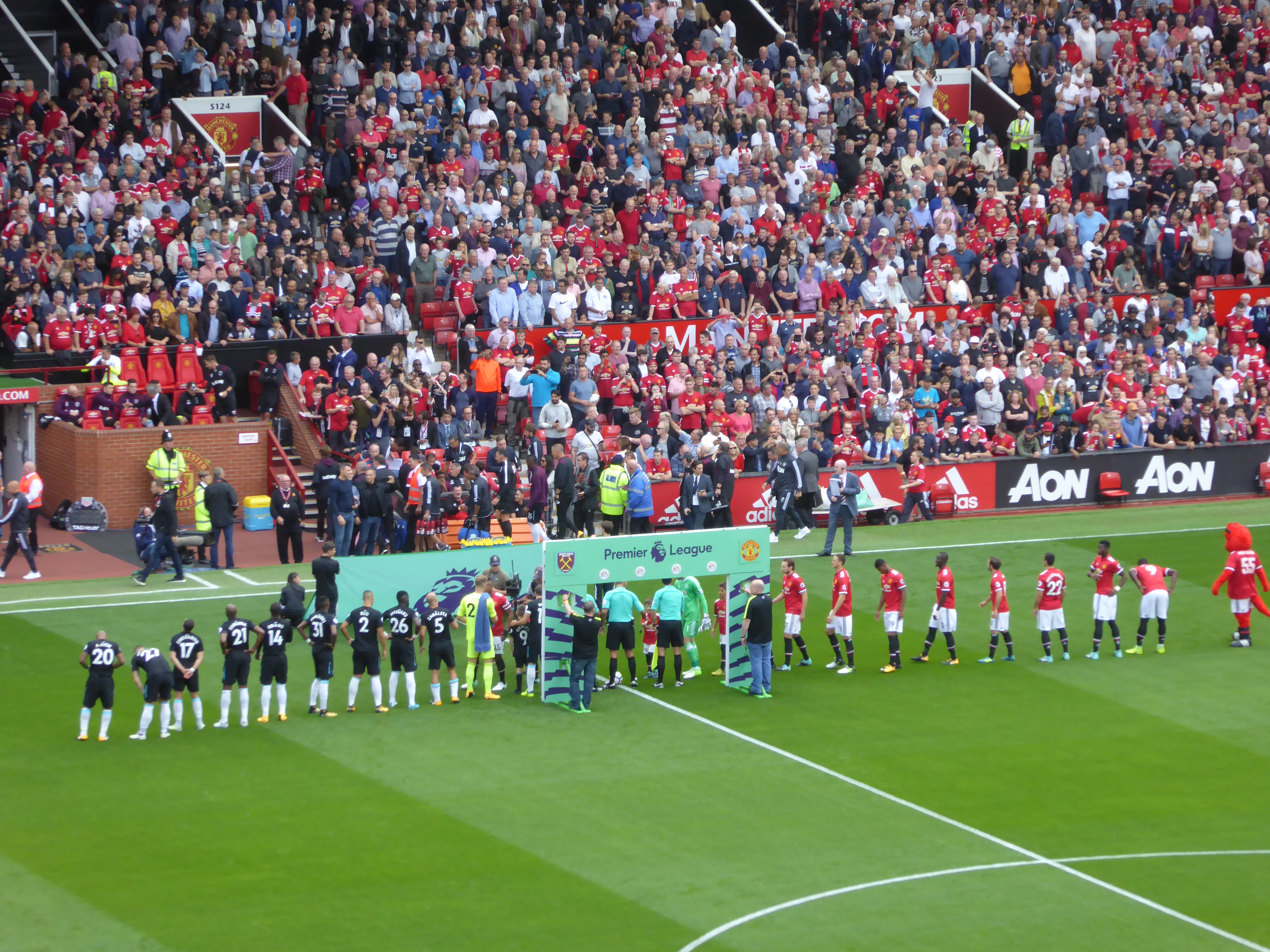
- Manchester United players lining up before a Premier League match against West Ham United in August 2017 at Old Trafford
- Co-chairmen: Joel and Avram Glazer
- Manager: Jose Mourinho
- Stadium: Old Trafford
- Premier League: 2nd
- FA Cup: Runners-up
- EFL Cup: Fifth round
- UEFA Champions League: Round of 16
- UEFA Super Cup: Runners-up
- Top goalscorer: League: Romelu Lukaku (16); All: Romelu Lukaku (27)
- Highest home attendance: 75,118 (vs. Crystal Palace, 30 September)
- Lowest home attendance: 54,256 (vs. Burton Albion, 20 September)
- Average home league attendance: 74,976
Home colours	Away colours	Third colours

The 2017–18 season was Manchester United's 26th season in the Premier League and their 43rd consecutive season in the top flight of English football. The season was the first since 2003–04 without former club captain Wayne Rooney, who rejoined Everton after 13 seasons with United, during which time he overtook Bobby Charlton as their all-time top scorer. United also returned to the Champions League after a single season's absence, having won the 2016–17 UEFA Europa League.

United achieved their highest points total and league placing since the retirement of Sir Alex Ferguson in 2013, amassing 81 points to finish second in the Premier League. However, despite winning three cups the previous season, the club failed to secure silverware this time around, also finishing as runners-up in both the UEFA Super Cup and FA Cup. United also suffered disappointing exits in both the EFL Cup and Champions League, bowing out to Bristol City and Sevilla respectively by 2–1 scorelines. Throughout the season, despite having a wealth of attacking options and completing the signing of Alexis Sánchez in January, manager José Mourinho was criticised by sections of the media and a section of United supporters for a perceived negative playing style.

== Pre-season and friendlies ==
United preceded their 2017–18 campaign with a tour of the United States, which included the first Manchester derby to be played outside the United Kingdom, in the International Champions Cup. The tour also included games against Real Madrid and Barcelona. The US tour started against LA Galaxy on 15 July 2017. United then faced Vålerenga in Norway. The final preparations during pre-season included a trip to the Republic of Ireland to face Sampdoria.

Date	Opponents	H / A	Result F–A	Scorers	Attendance
16 July 2017	LA Galaxy	A	5–2	Rashford (2) 2', 20', Fellaini 26', Mkhitaryan 67', Martial 72'	25,667
18 July 2017	Real Salt Lake	A	2–1	Mkhitaryan 29', Lukaku 38'	20,241
21 July 2017	Manchester City	N	2–0	Lukaku 37', Rashford 39'	67,401
23 July 2017	Real Madrid	N	1–1 (2–1p)	Lingard 45+1'	65,109
27 July 2017	Barcelona	N	0–1		80,161
30 July 2017	Vålerenga	A	3–0	Fellaini 44', Lukaku 47', McTominay 70'	25,137
2 August 2017	Sampdoria	N	2–1	Mkhitaryan 9', Mata 81'	50,000

== UEFA Super Cup ==
Manchester United, as winners of the 2016–17 UEFA Europa League faced Real Madrid, winners of the 2016–17 UEFA Champions League for the 2017 UEFA Super Cup on 8 August 2017, at the Philip II Arena in Skopje, Macedonia.

Date	Opponents	H / A	Result F–A	Scorers	Attendance
8 August 2017	Real Madrid	N	1–2	Lukaku 62'	30,421

== Premier League ==
The Premier League season began on 11 August 2017 and concluded on 13 May 2018. Michael Carrick played his final match against Watford as captain. He was subbed off in the 85th minute for Paul Pogba. He also received a guard of honour from both sets of players before the kick-off. This was also his 464th appearance for United.

Date	Opponents	H / A	Result F–A	Scorers	Attendance	League position
13 August 2017	West Ham United	H	4–0	Lukaku (2) 33', 52', Martial 87', Pogba 90'	74,928	1st
19 August 2017	Swansea City	A	4–0	Bailly 45', Lukaku 80', Pogba 82', Martial 84'	20,862	1st
26 August 2017	Leicester City	H	2–0	Rashford 70', Fellaini 82'	75,021	1st
9 September 2017	Stoke City	A	2–2	Rashford 45+1', Lukaku 57'	29,320	1st
17 September 2017	Everton	H	4–0	Valencia 4', Mkhitaryan 83', Lukaku 89', Martial 90+2' (pen.)	75,042	2nd
23 September 2017	Southampton	A	1–0	Lukaku 20'	31,930	2nd
30 September 2017	Crystal Palace	H	4–0	Mata 3', Fellaini (2) 35', 49', Lukaku 86'	75,118	2nd
14 October 2017	Liverpool	A	0–0		52,912	2nd
21 October 2017	Huddersfield Town	A	1–2	Rashford 78'	24,426	2nd
28 October 2017	Tottenham Hotspur	H	1–0	Martial 81'	75,034	2nd
5 November 2017	Chelsea	A	0–1		41,615	2nd
18 November 2017	Newcastle United	H	4–1	Martial 37', Smalling 45+1', Pogba 54', Lukaku 70'	75,035	2nd
25 November 2017	Brighton & Hove Albion	H	1–0	Dunk 66' (o.g.)	75,018	2nd
28 November 2017	Watford	A	4–2	Young (2) 19', 25', Martial 32', Lingard 86'	20,552	2nd
2 December 2017	Arsenal	A	3–1	Valencia 4', Lingard (2) 11', 63'	59,547	2nd
10 December 2017	Manchester City	H	1–2	Rashford 45+2'	74,847	2nd
13 December 2017	Bournemouth	H	1–0	Lukaku 25'	74,798	2nd
17 December 2017	West Bromwich Albion	A	2–1	Lukaku 27', Lingard 35'	24,782	2nd
23 December 2017	Leicester City	A	2–2	Mata (2) 40', 60'	32,202	2nd
26 December 2017	Burnley	H	2–2	Lingard (2) 53', 90+1'	75,046	2nd
30 December 2017	Southampton	H	0–0		75,051	3rd
1 January 2018	Everton	A	2–0	Martial 57', Lingard 81'	39,188	2nd
15 January 2018	Stoke City	H	3–0	Valencia 9', Martial 38', Lukaku 72'	74,726	2nd
20 January 2018	Burnley	A	1–0	Martial 54'	21,841	2nd
31 January 2018	Tottenham Hotspur	A	0–2		81,978	2nd
3 February 2018	Huddersfield Town	H	2–0	Lukaku 55', Sánchez 68'	74,742	2nd
11 February 2018	Newcastle United	A	0–1		52,309	2nd
25 February 2018	Chelsea	H	2–1	Lukaku 39', Lingard 75'	75,060	2nd
5 March 2018	Crystal Palace	A	3–2	Smalling 55', Lukaku 76', Matić 90+1'	25,840	2nd
10 March 2018	Liverpool	H	2–1	Rashford (2) 14', 24'	74,855	2nd
31 March 2018	Swansea City	H	2–0	Lukaku 5', Sánchez 20'	75,038	2nd
7 April 2018	Manchester City	A	3–2	Pogba (2) 53', 55', Smalling 69'	54,259	2nd
15 April 2018	West Bromwich Albion	H	0–1		75,095	2nd
18 April 2018	Bournemouth	A	2–0	Smalling 28', Lukaku 70'	10,952	2nd
29 April 2018	Arsenal	H	2–1	Pogba 16', Fellaini 90+1'	75,035	2nd
4 May 2018	Brighton & Hove Albion	A	0–1		30,611	2nd
10 May 2018	West Ham United	A	0–0		56,902	2nd
13 May 2018	Watford	H	1–0	Rashford 34'	75,049	2nd

Pos	Team	Pld	W	D	L	GF	GA	GD	Pts	Qualification or relegation
1	Manchester City (C)	38	32	4	2	106	27	+79	100	Qualification for the Champions League group stage
2	Manchester United	38	25	6	7	68	28	+40	81	Qualification for the Champions League group stage
3	Tottenham Hotspur	38	23	8	7	74	36	+38	77	Qualification for the Champions League group stage
4	Liverpool	38	21	12	5	84	38	+46	75	Qualification for the Champions League group stage
5	Chelsea	38	21	7	10	62	38	+24	70	Qualification for the Europa League group stage (Note: Since the winners of the 2017–18 FA Cup (Chelsea) and the winners of the 2017–18 EFL Cup (Manchester City) both qualified for European competition based on their league positions, the berths awarded to the 5th-placed team (Europa League group stage) and the League Cup winners (Europa League second qualifying round) were passed down the league.)

Source: Premier League
Rules for classification: 1) Points; 2) Goal difference; 3) Goals scored. 4) Play-offs (only if needed to decide champion, teams for relegation or teams for UEFA competitions).
(C) Champions

== FA Cup ==
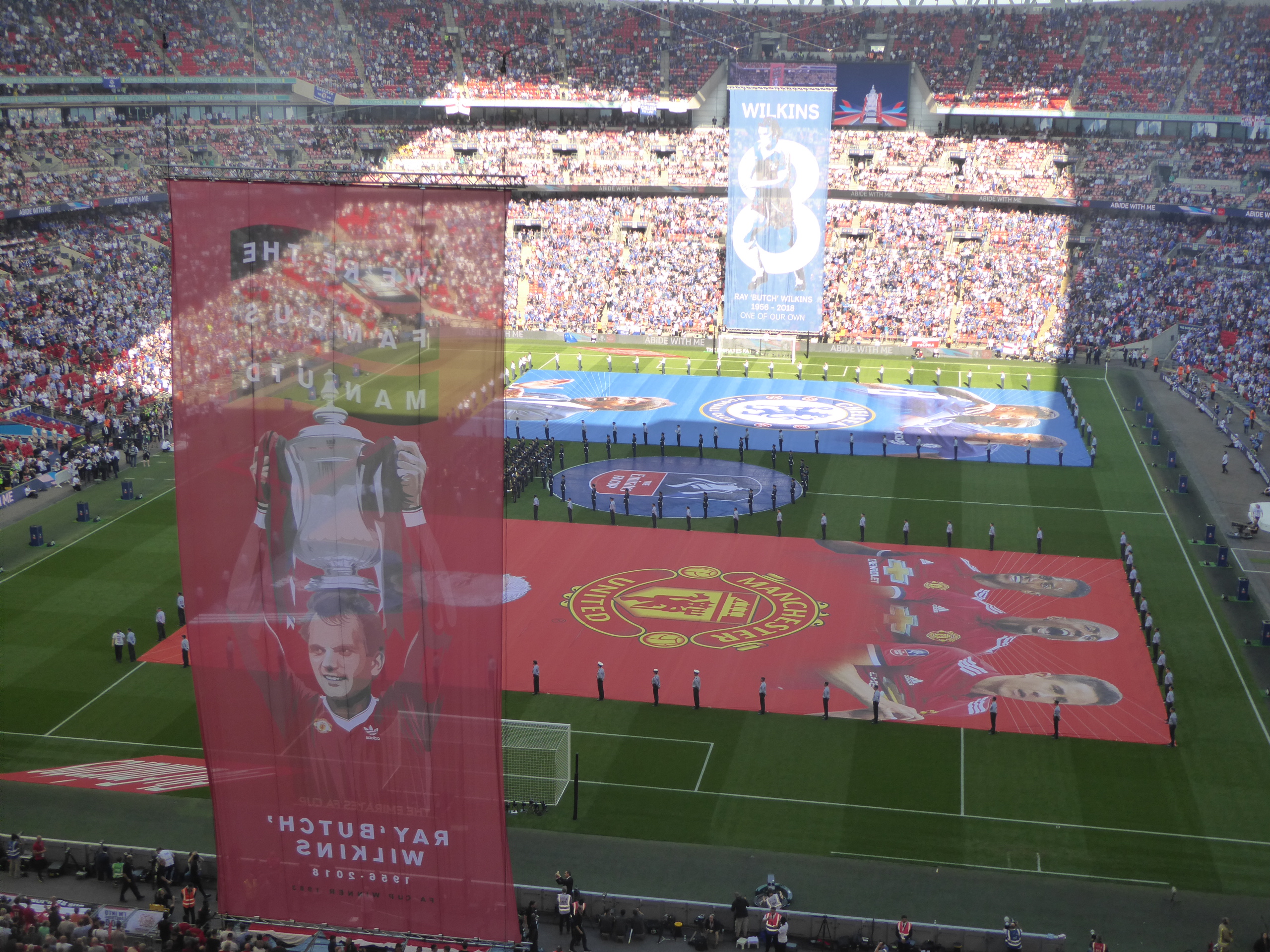
The opening ceremony of the FA Cup Final at Wembley Stadium

Manchester United entered the FA Cup in the third round as all 20 Premier League clubs automatically received a bye to that stage. Matches were played between 5–8 January 2018.

Date	Round	Opponents	H / A	Result F–A	Scorers	Attendance
5 January 2018	Round 3	Derby County	H	2–0	Lingard 84', Lukaku 90'	73,899
26 January 2018	Round 4	Yeovil Town	A	4–0	Rashford 41', Herrera 61', Lingard 89', Lukaku 90+3'	9,195
17 February 2018	Round 5	Huddersfield Town	A	2–0	Lukaku (2) 3', 55'	17,861
17 March 2018	Quarter-finals	Brighton & Hove Albion	H	2–0	Lukaku 37, Matić 83'	74,421
21 April 2018	Semi-finals	Tottenham Hotspur	N (Note: Although Tottenham Hotspur played their home games at Wembley in 2017–18, it was designated as a neutral venue for the FA Cup semi-final.)	2–1	Sánchez 24', Herrera 62'	84,667
19 May 2018	Final	Chelsea	N	0–1		87,647

== EFL Cup ==
Manchester United entered the EFL Cup as holders, having beaten Southampton in the 2017 cup final. As one of the seven clubs that qualified for European competition in 2017–18, they entered the EFL Cup in the third round, the draw for which was held on 24 August, with Manchester United being paired with Championship club Burton Albion. The two sides last met in the third round of the 2005–06 FA Cup, with United winning a replay 5–0 at Old Trafford following a goalless draw at the Pirelli Stadium. The fourth round draw confirmed the Red Devils visited Swansea City. The fifth round draw was held on 26 October 2017, with United drawn against another Championship side Bristol City.

Date	Round	Opponents	H / A	Result F–A	Scorers	Attendance
20 September 2017	Round 3	Burton Albion	H	4–1	Rashford (2) 5', 17', Lingard 36', Martial 60'	54,256
24 October 2017	Round 4	Swansea City	A	2–0	Lingard (2) 21', 59'	20,083
20 December 2017	Round 5	Bristol City	A	1–2	Ibrahimović 58'	26,088

== UEFA Champions League ==
=== Group stage ===
Manchester United qualified for the group stage of the Champions League as winners of the 2016–17 UEFA Europa League and were placed in pot 2 for the group stage draw. The draw was made on 24 August 2017, with Manchester United drawn alongside Benfica, Basel and CSKA Moscow. United were previously drawn with both Benfica and Basel in 2011–12, and with CSKA Moscow in 2009–10 and 2015–16; in 2011–12 and 2015–16, they finished third in the group and dropped down to the UEFA Europa League, while in 2009–10, United topped the group.

Date	Opponents	H / A	Result F–A	Scorers	Attendance	Group position
12 September 2017	Basel	H	3–0	Fellaini 35', Lukaku 53', Rashford 84'	73,854	1st
27 September 2017	CSKA Moscow	A	4–1	Lukaku (2) 4', 27', Martial 19' (pen.), Mkhitaryan 57'	29,073	1st
18 October 2017	Benfica	A	1–0	Rashford 64'	57,684	1st
31 October 2017	Benfica	H	2–0	Svilar 45' (o.g.), Blind 78' (pen.)	74,437	1st
22 November 2017	Basel	A	0–1		36,000	1st
5 December 2017	CSKA Moscow	H	2–1	Lukaku 64', Rashford 66'	74,669	1st

Pos	Team	Pld	W	D	L	GF	GA	GD	Pts	Qualification	MUN	BSL	CSKA	BEN
1	(England) Manchester United	6	5	0	1	12	3	+9	15	Advance to knockout phase	—	3–0	2–1	2–0
2	(Switzerland) Basel	6	4	0	2	11	5	+6	12	Advance to knockout phase	1–0	—	1–2	5–0
3	(Russia) CSKA Moscow	6	3	0	3	8	10	−2	9	Transfer to Europa League	1–4	0–2	—	2–0
4	(Portugal) Benfica	6	0	0	6	1	14	−13	0		0–1	0–2	1–2	—

Source: UEFA

=== Knockout phase ===
After winning their group and progressing to the round of 16, United were drawn against Spanish club Sevilla in the first competitive meeting between the two sides. After a goalless draw in the first leg at the Ramón Sánchez Pizjuán Stadium, Sevilla took the lead in the tie late in the second leg, when Wissam Ben Yedder scored twice within minutes of coming on as a substitute. Romelu Lukaku pulled one back for United six minutes from the end, but they were unable to score the two further goals required to avoid elimination.

Date	Round	Opponents	H / A	Result F–A	Scorers	Attendance
21 February 2018	Round of 16; First leg	Sevilla	A	0–0		39,725
13 March 2018	Round of 16; Second leg	Sevilla	H	1–2	Lukaku 84'	74,909

== Squad statistics ==
No.	Pos.	Name	League		FA Cup		League Cup		Europe		Other		Total		Discipline	
No.	Pos.	Name	Apps	Goals	Apps	Goals	Apps	Goals	Apps	Goals	Apps	Goals	Apps	Goals	Yellow card	Red card
1	GK	(Spain) David de Gea	37	0	2	0	0	0	6	0	1	0	46	0	0	0
2	DF	(Sweden) Victor Lindelöf	13(4)	0	3	0	3	0	5	0	1	0	25(4)	0	1	0
3	DF	(Ivory Coast) Eric Bailly	11(2)	1	1(1)	0	0	0	3	0	0	0	15(3)	1	3	0
4	DF	(England) Phil Jones	23	0	2	0	0	0	0	0	0	0	25	0	3	0
5	DF	(Argentina) Marcos Rojo	8(1)	0	1	0	1	0	1	0	0	0	11(1)	0	6	0
6	MF	(France) Paul Pogba	25(2)	6	3	0	1	0	3(2)	0	1	0	33(4)	6	6	1
7	FW	(Chile) Alexis Sánchez	12	2	4	1	0	0	2	0	0	0	18	3	2	0
8	MF	(Spain) Juan Mata	23(5)	3	4(1)	0	1	0	5(1)	0	0	0	33(7)	3	1	0
9	FW	(Belgium) Romelu Lukaku	33(1)	16	3(3)	5	0(2)	0	8	5	1	1	45(6)	27	4	0
10	FW	(Sweden) Zlatan Ibrahimović	1(4)	0	0	0	1	1	0(1)	0	0	0	2(5)	1	0	0
11	FW	(France) Anthony Martial	18(12)	9	1(3)	0	3	1	4(4)	1	0	0	26(19)	11	1	0
12	DF	(England) Chris Smalling	28(1)	4	5	0	2(1)	0	8	0	1	0	44(2)	4	4	0
14	MF	(England) Jesse Lingard	20(13)	8	4(2)	2	2	3	3(3)	0	1	0	30(18)	13	5	0
15	MF	(Brazil) Andreas Pereira	0	0	0	0	0	0	0	0	0	0	0	0	0	0
16	MF	(England) Michael Carrick (c)	1(1)	0	2	0	1	0	0	0	0	0	4(1)	0	0	0
17	DF	(Netherlands) Daley Blind	4(3)	0	1	0	3	0	6	1	0	0	14(3)	1	2	0
18	MF	(England) Ashley Young	28(2)	2	3(1)	0	0	0	4	0	0	0	35(3)	2	9	0
19	FW	(England) Marcus Rashford	17(18)	7	3(2)	1	3	2	3(5)	3	0(1)	0	26(26)	13	7	0
20	GK	(Argentina) Sergio Romero	1	0	4	0	3	0	2	0	0	0	10	0	0	0
21	MF	(Spain) Ander Herrera	13(13)	0	4	2	2	0	5(1)	0	1	0	25(14)	2	6	0
22	MF	(Armenia) Henrikh Mkhitaryan	11(4)	1	1	0	0(1)	0	3(1)	1	1	0	16(6)	2	2	0
23	DF	(England) Luke Shaw	8(3)	0	4	0	1(2)	0	1	0	0	0	14(5)	0	2	0
25	DF	(Ecuador) Antonio Valencia	31	3	3	0	0	0	4	0	1	0	39	3	10	0
27	MF	(Belgium) Marouane Fellaini	5(11)	4	0(3)	0	0	0	2(1)	1	0(1)	0	7(16)	5	1	0
29	FW	(England) James Wilson	0	0	0	0	0	0	0	0	0	0	0	0	0	0
31	MF	(Serbia) Nemanja Matić	35(1)	1	4	1	0(1)	0	6(1)	0	1	0	46(3)	2	6	0
35	DF	(England) Demetri Mitchell	0	0	0	0	0	0	0	0	0	0	0	0	0	0
36	DF	(Italy) Matteo Darmian	5(3)	0	1(1)	0	3	0	2(1)	0	1	0	12(5)	0	1	0
38	DF	(England) Axel Tuanzebe	0(1)	0	0	0	1	0	0(1)	0	0	0	1(2)	0	1	0
39	MF	(Scotland) Scott McTominay	7(6)	0	3	0	2(1)	0	2(2)	0	0	0	14(9)	0	4	0
40	GK	(Portugal) Joel Castro Pereira	0	0	0	0	0(1)	0	0	0	0	0	0(1)	0	0	0
43	DF	(England) Cameron Borthwick-Jackson	0	0	0	0	0	0	0	0	0	0	0	0	0	0
45	GK	(Republic of Ireland) Kieran O'Hara	0	0	0	0	0	0	0	0	0	0	0	0	0	0
47	MF	(England) Angel Gomes	0	0	0(1)	0	0	0	0	0	0	0	0(1)	0	0	0
48	MF	(Scotland) Ethan Hamilton	0	0	0	0	0	0	0	0	0	0	0	0	0	0
Own goals			–	1	–	0	–	0	–	1	–	0	–	2	–	–

Statistics accurate as of 19 May 2018.

== Transfers ==
=== In ===
Date	Pos.	Name	From	Fee
1 July 2017	DF	(Sweden) Victor Lindelöf	(Portugal) Benfica	Undisclosed (Note: Fee reported as £30.7 million)
10 July 2017	FW	(Belgium) Romelu Lukaku	(England) Everton	Undisclosed (Note: Fee reported as £75 million)
31 July 2017	MF	(Serbia) Nemanja Matić	(England) Chelsea	Undisclosed (Note: Fee reported as £40 million)
24 August 2017	FW	(Sweden) Zlatan Ibrahimović	Unattached	
22 January 2018	FW	(Chile) Alexis Sánchez	(England) Arsenal	Undisclosed

=== Out ===
Date	Pos.	Name	To	Fee
30 June 2017	FW	(Sweden) Zlatan Ibrahimović	Released	
30 June 2017	FW	(England) Kayne Diedrick-Roberts	Released	
30 June 2017	MF	(Democratic Republic of the Congo) Faustin Makela	Released	
30 June 2017	MF	(England) Josh Harrop	(England) Preston North End	Undisclosed
9 July 2017	FW	(England) Wayne Rooney	(England) Everton	Undisclosed
12 July 2017	MF	(Belgium) Adnan Januzaj	(Spain) Real Sociedad	Undisclosed (Note: Fee reported as £9.8 million)
12 August 2017	DF	(Uruguay) Guillermo Varela	(Uruguay) Peñarol	Undisclosed
22 January 2018	MF	(Armenia) Henrikh Mkhitaryan	(England) Arsenal	Undisclosed
22 March 2018	FW	(Sweden) Zlatan Ibrahimović	Released (Note: Following his release, Ibrahimović joined LA Galaxy.)	
3 April 2018	DF	(England) Harry Spratt	(England) Huddersfield Town	Free
3 April 2018	DF	(England) Jake Barrett	(England) Huddersfield Town	Free

=== Loan out ===
Date from	Date to	Pos.	Name	To
7 July 2017	30 June 2018	DF	(Wales) Regan Poole	(England) Northampton Town
10 July 2017	30 June 2018	GK	(England) Dean Henderson	(England) Shrewsbury Town
14 July 2017	30 June 2018	GK	(England) Sam Johnstone	(England) Aston Villa
28 July 2017	January 2018	MF	(England) Devonte Redmond	(England) Scunthorpe United
7 August 2017	16 January 2018	DF	(England) Cameron Borthwick-Jackson	(England) Leeds United
10 August 2017	30 June 2018	DF	(Netherlands) Timothy Fosu-Mensah	(England) Crystal Palace
31 August 2017	31 January 2018	MF	(England) Matty Willock	(Netherlands) Utrecht
1 September 2017	30 June 2018	MF	(Brazil) Andreas Pereira	(Spain) Valencia
10 January 2018	30 June 2018	FW	(England) James Wilson	(England) Sheffield United
11 January 2018	30 June 2018	DF	(England) Demetri Mitchell	(Scotland) Heart of Midlothian
25 January 2018	30 June 2018	DF	(England) Axel Tuanzebe	(England) Aston Villa
31 January 2018	30 June 2018	MF	(England) Matty Willock	(Scotland) St Johnstone
31 January 2018	30 June 2018	DF	(England) Charlie Scott	(Scotland) Hamilton Academical
