= Palm City FC =

Football club in Dubai, United Arab Emirates

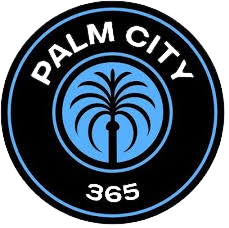
- Full name: Palm City Football Club
- Nickname: The Tribe
- Founded: October 2023, as Al Qabila FC
- Stadium: Shabab Al Ahli Al Aweer
- Chairman: Sheikh Ahmed Bin Sultan Bin Khalifa Al Nahyan
- Manager: Grégory Dufrennes
- League: UAE First Division League
Home colours

Palm City FC (Arabic: نادي بالم سيتي لكرة القدم, formerly Al Qabila FC, also known as 365 FC) is a professional football club based in Dubai, United Arab Emirates. As of the 2026-27 season, the club will compete in the UAE First Division League, the second tier of Emirati football.

== History ==
The club was founded in October 2023 by Soheil Var, a former professional footballer and influencer, as Al Qabila FC, which means "The Tribe" in Arabic. The club gained recognition through Soheil Var's social media platforms when he announced the challenge of "Building a Pro Football Club in 365 Days."

The whole process was documented on social media and the football club was built step by step from scratch. After attracting millions of viewers and going viral, the club secured a pro license within its first six months of operation. The United Arab Emirates Football Association, however, did not recognize the Al Qabila FC name and the club was referred to as 365 FC in official league competitions.

The club appointed English former professional footballer Steven Taylor as its first head coach, also recruiting former Newcastle player Demba Cisse, following his departure from French club Amiens. JerseyBird was selected as the kit manufacturer.

Sheikh Ahmed bin Sultan bin Khalifa Al Nahyan was appointed as club president.

Al Qabila FC played its first competitive match in September 2024, securing a 3–1 victory over TFA Dubai. In the club's first league season, they got promotion to the UAE Second Division.

In October 2025, the club rebranded to Palm City FC after its former name had complications with the United Arab Emirates Football Association. The club signed former Barcelona attacker Cristian Tello and MLS MVP Alejandro Pozuelo. International food brand Yayla came on board as their front kit sponsor.

The club went on to win the UAE Second Division title and the UAE FA Cup in the 2025–26 season.

== Honours ==
=== Leagues ===
- UAE Second Division: 1
  - 2025–26

=== Cups ===
- UAE FA Cup :1
  - 2025–26

== Squad ==
Note: Flags indicate national team as defined under FIFA eligibility rules; some limited exceptions apply. Players may hold more than one non-FIFA nationality.

No.	Pos.	Nation	Player
1	GK	JOR	Rajai Ardakani
2	DF	ENG	Zackary Chislett
3	DF	CAN	Ndzemdzela Langwa
4	DF	ENG	Richie Danquah
5	DF	FRA	Kurt Zouma
7	DF	AUT	Soheil Varahram
10	MF	ESP	Alejandro Pozuelo
11	MF	NED	Brahim Darri
12	DF	ESP	Manuel Cedenilla
13	FW	CIV	Bi Djehe
15	FW	GHA	Hunter Christian
21	MF	UAE	Juma Al-Falasi
22	DF	GER	Tobias Pachonik
23	GK	NED	Koen Geven
28	MF	GHA	Max Y
40	DF	GHA	Silas Mensah
45	MF	DEN	Gabriel Kamavuako

No.	Pos.	Nation	Player
49	GK	ENG	Callum Stanton
77	GK	CRO	Matko Obradović
95	GK	GER	Armin Herbert
99	MF	ENG	David Webb (captain)
—	GK	UAE	Sultan Omar
—	GK	UAE	Jamal Al-Hosani
—	DF	UAE	Firas Al-Khaseebi
—	DF	UAE	Abdulrahman Saleh
—	MF	UAE	Rashid Al-Awadhi
—	MF	UAE	Hassan Qassem
—	MF	UAE	Rashed Nooh
—	MF	UAE	Amer Omar
—	MF	UKR	Yegor Tsevukh
—	MF	UAE	Ismail Al Hammadi
—	FW	UAE	Hamad Al-Katheeri
—	FW	MLI	Abdoulay Diaby
—	FW	UAE	Abdulaziz Dawood
—	FW	MLI	Moussa Marega

== Club officials ==
Position	Tenure	Name
Club President	2024-	Sheikh Ahmed bin Sultan bin Khalifa Al Nahyan
Head Coach	2025-	Iñaki Beni
S&C Coach	2024-	Antonios Assad
