= Alejandro Pozuelo =

Spanish footballer (born 1991)

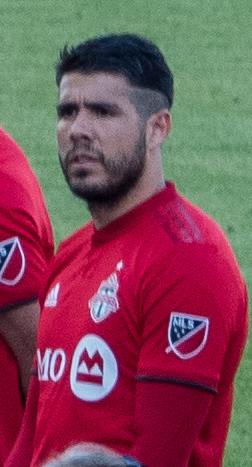
- Pozuelo with Toronto FC in 2020

Personal information
- Full name: Alejandro Pozuelo Melero
- Date of birth: 20 September 1991 (age 35)
- Place of birth: Seville, Spain
- Height: 1.70 m (5 ft 7 in)
- Position: Attacking midfielder

Team information
- Current team: Palm City
- Number: 10

Youth career
- Betis

Senior career*
Years	Team	Apps	(Gls)
2010–2012	Betis B	44	(16)
2011–2013	Betis	29	(3)
2013–2014	Swansea City	22	(0)
2014–2015	Rayo Vallecano	11	(0)
2015–2019	Genk	106	(17)
2019–2022	Toronto FC	88	(26)
2022	Inter Miami	12	(2)
2023	Konyaspor	12	(4)
2023–2024	Al Jazira	21	(3)
2024–2025	Al-Fayha	30	(4)
2025–	Palm City	0	(0)
- * Club domestic league appearances and goals as of 21:36, 26 May 2025 (UTC)

Alejandro Pozuelo Melero (born 20 September 1991) is a Spanish professional footballer who plays for UAE First Division League club Palm City as an attacking midfielder.

Developed in the Betis system, he amassed La Liga totals of 40 matches and three goals for that club and Rayo Vallecano. In 2014 he signed with Genk from Swansea City, going on to spend several seasons in the Belgian Pro League with the former team. In 2019, he joined Major League Soccer side Toronto FC, moving to Inter Miami three years later.

== Club career ==
=== Betis ===
Born in Seville, Andalusia, Pozuelo spent his youth career at his local club Real Betis. He made his senior debut with the B team, spending two seasons in the Segunda División B.

Pozuelo made his official debut with the main squad on 2 October 2011, playing the second half of a 1–0 La Liga home loss against Levante UD. On 18 December he scored his first league goal for the Verdiblancos, as well as being sent off in the 2–0 win at Atlético Madrid.

Pozuelo was promoted to Betis' first team for the 2012–13 campaign. He appeared in a total of 13 games in all competitions, netting his only goal in a 5–3 away victory over Athletic Bilbao.

In total, Pozuelo made 33 appearances during his tenure, scoring three goals.

=== Swansea City ===
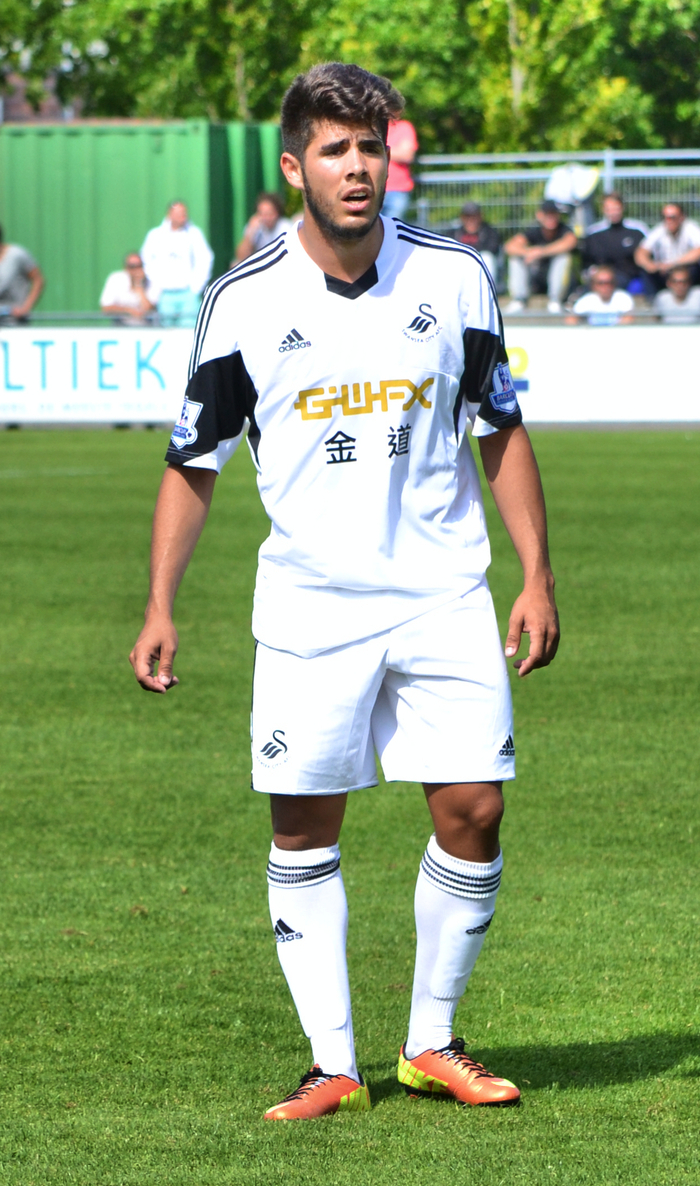
Pozuelo with Swansea in 2013

On 2 July 2013, Pozuelo joined Swansea City on a three-year contract for an undisclosed fee, signing alongside teammate José Cañas and becoming the seventh Spaniard in the squad. He scored on his debut for the club, rounding off the scoring in a 4–0 home defeat of Malmö FF in the first leg of the third qualifying round of the UEFA Europa League. He netted his second in the same competition and also at the Liberty Stadium on 22 August 2013 in a 5–1 play-off round win against Romania's FC Petrolul Ploiești.

During his spell in Wales, Pozuelo played 36 matches across all competitions, scoring twice and adding six assists.

=== Rayo Vallecano ===
Pozuelo returned to his country's top division on 24 July 2014, joining Rayo Vallecano for an undisclosed fee. His first competitive appearance took place on 14 September, as he came on as a 61st-minute substitute in a 3–2 home loss to Elche CF.

Pozuelo took part in 13 official games in his only season, registering one goal in the Copa del Rey against Valencia CF.

=== Genk ===
On 31 August 2015, Pozuelo moved abroad again, signing a two-year deal at Belgian Pro League team K.R.C. Genk. He scored six goals in 2016–17, helping to a final eighth position in the regular season. He later became their captain, and collected a total of 175 appearances in all competitions over five seasons, with 25 goals and 60 decisive passes.

In February 2019, Toronto FC planned to trigger Pozuelo's €8 million release clause, however, a disagreement ensued with Genk questioning the validity of the release clause and refusing to allow the player to move. Following a lengthy transfer discussion, the two sides reached a compromise for the player to finish out the main portion of the season with the latter and join the former on 18 March. When he left, his team were sitting in first place in the domestic league.

=== Toronto FC ===
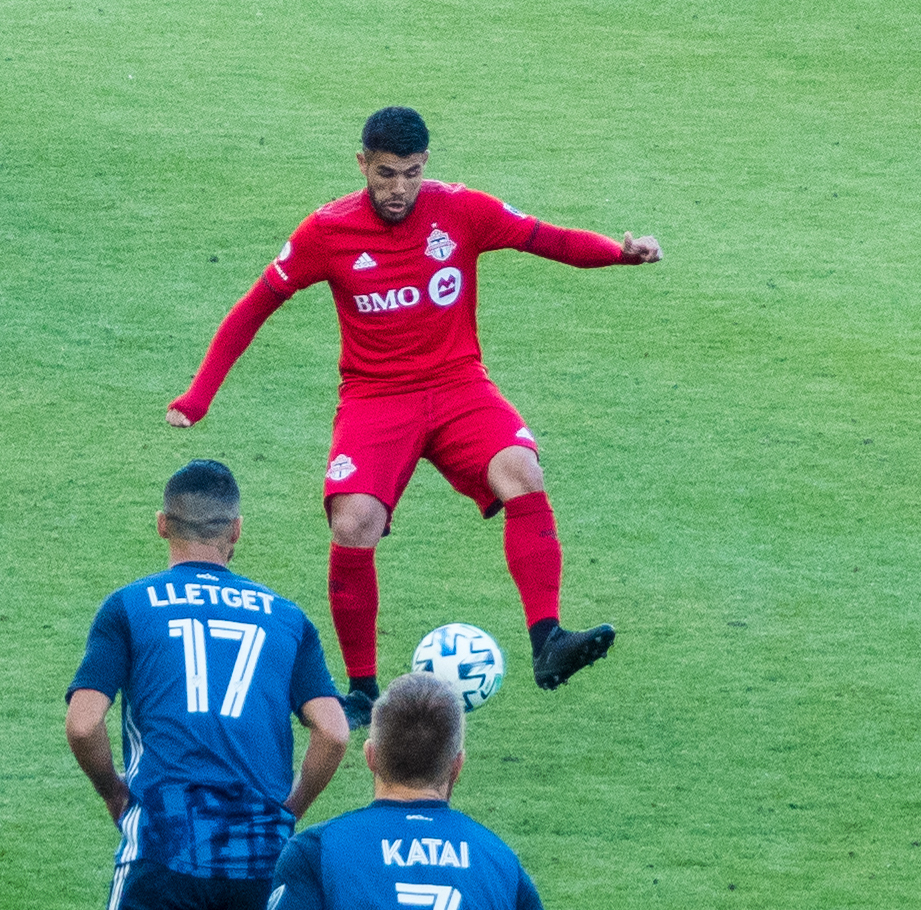
Pozuelo playing for Toronto FC against LA Galaxy

On 4 March 2019, Pozuelo signed with Major League Soccer side Toronto FC as a designated player, as a replacement for the recently departed Sebastian Giovinco and compatriot Víctor Vázquez in the creative midfield role, also inheriting the number ten shirt which had previously been worn by the Italian. He made his debut late in the same month in a 4–0 home win over New York City FC, assisting the opening goal of the match by teammate Jozy Altidore and later scoring two himself – one from the penalty spot Panenka-style and one chipped over the goalkeeper. He finished as the team's top scorer in the regular season with twelve goals while also adding twelve assists, and was named to the MLS Best XI.

On 23 October 2019, Pozuelo scored twice in a 2–1 win over New York City FC in the playoffs' Eastern Conference semi-finals, including a 90th minute Panenka-style penalty kick which was his third of the campaign in that fashion. On 10 November, he set up Altidore's injury-time goal in a 3–1 away defeat to Seattle Sounders FC in the MLS Cup Final.

Pozuelo started every match during the 2020 campaign, scoring nine goals and recording ten assists (the joint most in the league) as he led his side to the second best record in the regular season. He was named to the Best XI for a second consecutive year, and on 7 December was awarded the Landon Donovan MVP Award for the league's best player. On 2 July 2022, he played his 100th official match, a 2–0 home loss against Seattle Sounders.

=== Inter Miami ===
On 7 July 2022, Pozuelo was traded to Inter Miami CF for $150,000 in General Allocation Money as well as additional conditional GAM depending on certain performance metrics. On 14 August, his brace helped the hosts to defeat New York City 3–2.

=== Konyaspor ===
On 3 March 2023, Pozuelo agreed to a short-term deal at Turkish club Konyaspor. On 16 May, he scored twice in a 3–0 win away at Alanyaspor, his second goal being the team's 900th in the Süper Lig.

=== Later career ===
On 9 July 2023, Pozuelo joined Al Jazira Club of the UAE Pro League after his contract expired. In August 2024, he moved to Saudi Pro League side Al-Fayha FC on a one-year deal.

== Style of play ==
A versatile and creative midfielder with good ball skills, technique and an eye for goal, Pozuelo usually played in a playmaking role as an attacking midfielder, although he also featured as a central midfielder. Although naturally right-footed, he was capable of playing off of either foot, and is known for his vision and ability to provide assists for teammates. Toronto FC president Bill Manning described him as "a guy who can pull the strings, someone who can manage the game, make the special plays that make goals", while the club's manager Greg Vanney described him as "an attacking player first and foremost. We want to use him in that role. He'll play close to [Altidore] and we'll use him a lot in setting up our attacks. He's outstanding at understanding how to move around, manipulate numbers on the field, play between lines. [He has] the vision for the final pass and the ability to spring some of our guys as runners. But it's also his ability to finish plays off in different ways. For us it's the engine through that final phase of our attack."

Pozuelo was also used as a false-nine on occasion.

== Career statistics ==
As of match played 26 May 2025

Appearances and goals by club, season and competition
Club	Season	League			Playoffs (Note: Includes Belgian Pro League play-offs, MLS Cup playoffs)		National cup (Note: Includes Copa del Rey, FA Cup, Belgian Cup, Canadian Championship, UAE President's Cup, King Cup)		League cup (Note: Includes Football League Cup, UAE League Cup)		Continental		Other		Total	
Club	Season	Division	Apps	Goals	Apps	Goals	Apps	Goals	Apps	Goals	Apps	Goals	Apps	Goals	Apps	Goals
Betis B	2010–11	Segunda División B	30	5	—		—		—		—		—		30	5
Betis B	2011–12	Segunda División B	14	11	—		—		—		—		—		14	11
Betis B	Total		44	16	0	0	0	0	0	0	0	0	0	0	44	16
Betis	2011–12	La Liga	18	2	—		2	0	—		—		—		20	2
Betis	2012–13	La Liga	11	1	—		2	0	—		—		—		13	1
Betis	Total		29	3	0	0	4	0	0	0	0	0	0	0	33	3
Swansea City	2013–14	Premier League	22	0	—		2	0	1	0	11 (Note: Appearances in UEFA Europa League)	2	—		36	2
Rayo Vallecano	2014–15	La Liga	11	0	—		2	1	—		—		—		13	1
Genk	2015–16	Belgian Pro League	21	1	12	3	5	0	—		—		—		38	4
Genk	2016–17	Belgian Pro League	29	6	4	1	5	0	—		15	1	—		53	8
Genk	2017–18	Belgian Pro League	28	5	11	0	5	1	—		—		—		44	6
Genk	2018–19	Belgian Pro League	28	5	0	0	1	0	—		13	2	—		42	7
Genk	Total		106	17	27	4	16	1	0	0	28	3	0	0	177	25
Toronto FC	2019	Major League Soccer	30	12	4	2	2	0	—		—		—		36	14
Toronto FC	2020	Major League Soccer	23 (Note: Includes three appearances in MLS is Back Tournament group stage)	9	1	0	0	0	—		—		1 (Note: Appearance in MLS is Back Tournament knockout stage)	0	25	9
Toronto FC	2021	Major League Soccer	19	1	—		2	0	—		0	0	—		21	1
Toronto FC	2022	Major League Soccer	16	4	—		2 (Note: Includes appearance and goal in 2020 Canadian Championship final (played in 2022))	2	—		—		—		18	6
Toronto FC	Total		88	26	5	2	6	2	0	0	0	0	1	0	100	30
Inter Miami	2022	Major League Soccer	12	2	1	0	0	0	—		—		—		13	2
Konyaspor	2022–23	Süper Lig	12	4	—		—		—		—		—		12	4
Al Jazira	2023–24	UAE Pro League	21	3	—		2	0	3	0	—		—		26	3
Al-Fayha	2024–25	Saudi Pro League	30	4	—		2	1	—		—		—		32	5
Career total			375	75	33	6	34	5	4	0	39	5	1	0	486	91

== Honours ==
Toronto FC

- Canadian Championship: 2020
- Eastern Conference Championship (playoffs): 2019

Palm City

- UAE Second Division League: 2025–26
- UAE Federation Cup: 2025–26

Individual

- Landon Donovan MVP Award: 2020
- MLS Best XI: 2019, 2020
- MLS Player of the Month: September 2020
- Major League Soccer top assist provider: 2020
- MLS All-Star Game: 2019
- Red Patch Boys Player of the Year: 2019, 2020
