= Chris Smalling =

English footballer (born 1989)

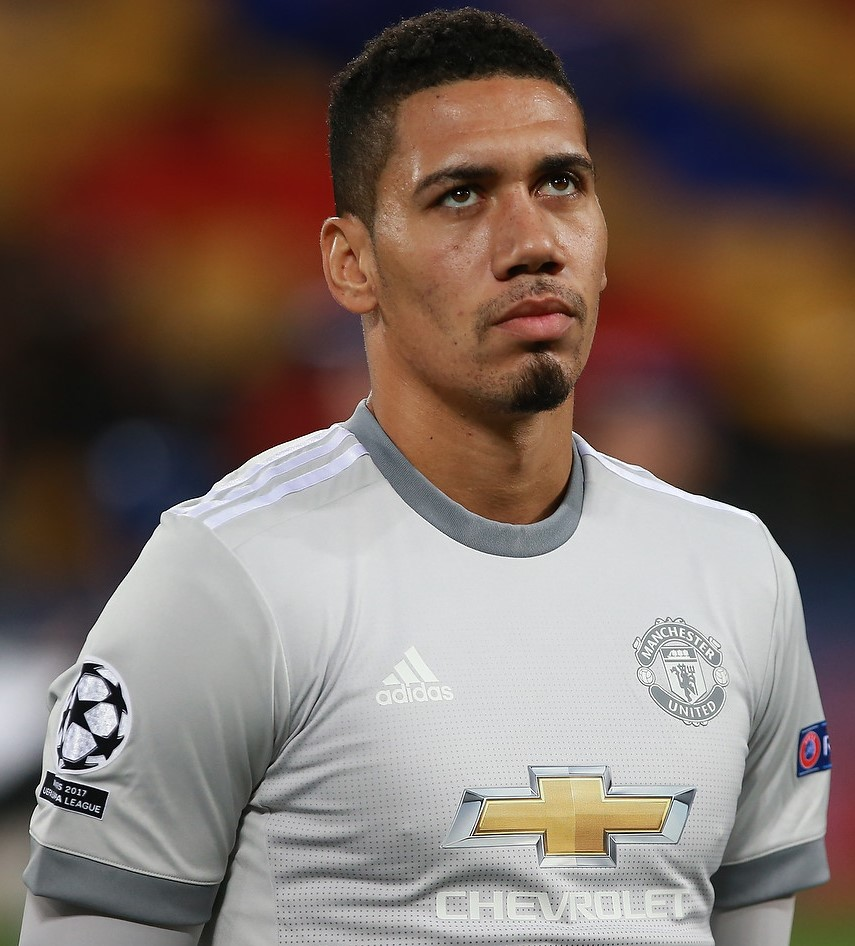
- Smalling with Manchester United in 2017

Personal information
- Full name: Christopher Lloyd Smalling
- Date of birth: 22 November 1989 (age 36)
- Place of birth: Greenwich, England
- Height: 6 ft 4 in (1.94 m)
- Position: Centre-back

Team information
- Current team: Porto
- Number: 6

Youth career
- Walderslade Boys
- Lordswood
- 2002–2004: Millwall
- 2006–2007: Maidstone United

Senior career*
Years	Team	Apps	(Gls)
2007–2008	Maidstone United	12	(1)
2008–2010	Fulham	13	(0)
2010–2020	Manchester United	206	(12)
2019–2020	→ Roma (loan)	30	(3)
2020–2024	Roma	83	(6)
2024–2026	Al-Fayha	64	(4)
2026–	Porto	0	(0)

International career
2008	England Schools U18	5	(1)
2009	England U20	1	(0)
2009–2011	England U21	14	(1)
2011–2017	England	31	(1)
- * Club domestic league appearances and goals as of 21 May 2026

Christopher Lloyd Smalling (born 22 November 1989) is an English professional footballer who plays as a centre-back for Primeira Liga club Porto.

During his youth, Smalling played for the Millwall academy before joining non-League club Maidstone United. Soon after, in June 2008, he signed for Premier League club Fulham; he made his professional debut with the club in May 2009, and helped them reach the UEFA Europa League final in the following season.

In January 2010, Smalling signed a pre-contract agreement with Manchester United and joined them officially in July 2010. He made his competitive debut in the 2010 FA Community Shield victory over Chelsea, which earned him his first career medal. He went on to make more than 300 appearances for the club, winning two Premier League titles, an FA Cup, a League Cup, a UEFA Europa League and a further two Community Shields. He joined Italian side Roma in 2019, where he won the UEFA Europa Conference League in his third season.

Smalling represented the England Schools under-18 team in early 2008, before making his debut for the national under-20 and under-21 teams in 2009. He made his senior international debut in September 2011 and appeared at the 2014 FIFA World Cup and UEFA Euro 2016, earning 31 caps until 2017.

== Early life ==
Smalling was born in Greenwich, London. He is of Jamaican descent. His father Lloyd died when Chris was aged five. Smalling has one brother. After his father's death the family moved to Kent, where he then attended Chatham Grammar School for Boys, now known as Holcombe Grammar School. Smalling was a schoolboy national Judo champion, and also finished second in an international competition. He was a boyhood Arsenal fan.

== Club career ==
=== Maidstone United ===
As a youngster he played for Walderslade Boys and Lordswood. During his teenage years he sometimes missed training as he could not afford to pay for the bus. After a short spell at Millwall's academy, a 16-year-old Smalling joined Maidstone United's youth set-up.

After rising through Maidstone United's youth and reserve team set-up under the tutelage of coaches Peter Nott and Tony Cornwell, Smalling made his first-team debut for 'The Stones' on 11 April 2007, in a 4–1 loss against Tonbridge Angels in the Kent Senior Cup. After making further appearances in the FA Trophy and Isthmian League Cup, Smalling made his league debut for the club in December 2007, playing the full 90 minutes in a 1–1 draw against Harlow Town. Smalling impressed and quickly established himself as a vital part of Maidstone United's back line; however, injury and international duty restricted his appearances. Smalling scored one goal for Maidstone United, in a 4–2 win at East Thurrock United on 24 March 2008, a match which was also his last game for the club.

=== Fulham ===
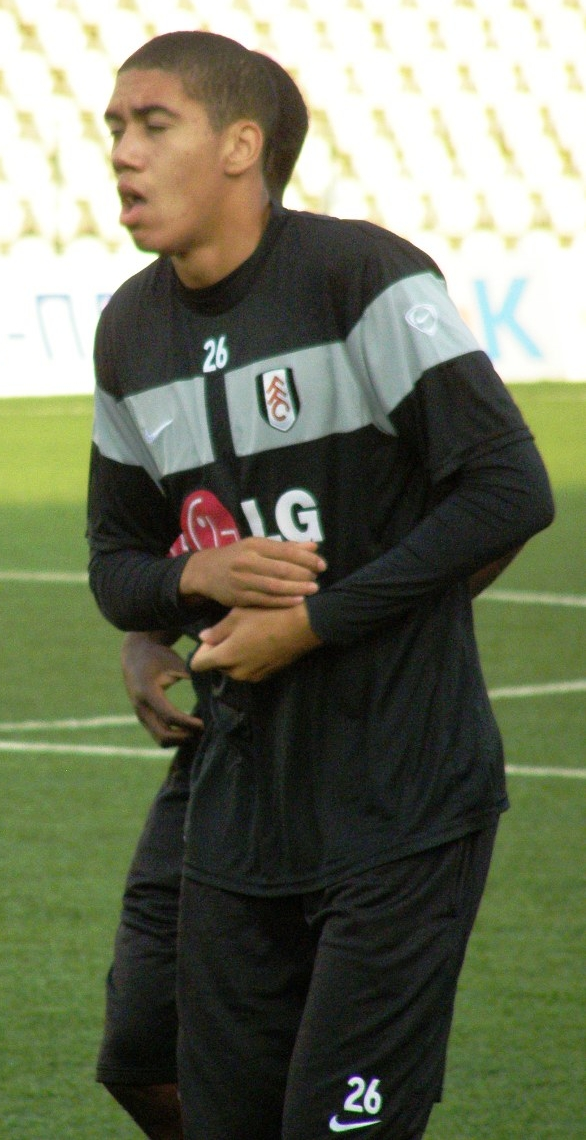
Smalling warming up for Fulham in 2009

After attracting strong interest from Fulham, Gillingham, Charlton Athletic and Reading, Smalling signed for Middlesbrough on a two-year contract on 30 April 2008. However, within a month of signing, his contract with Middlesbrough was cancelled, with Smalling concerned about homesickness, and in June 2008, he signed for Premier League club Fulham. Smalling was not on a contract at Maidstone United, for it would have prohibited him from playing for England Schoolboys, and as such the Isthmian League club were not entitled to a fee for the player; however, Fulham struck a deal which saw Maidstone United given £10,000 upon the transfer and £10,000 for every 10 league matches he played. He was made captain of the club's Development Squad by manager Billy McKinlay.

On 24 May 2009, Smalling made his Premier League debut for Fulham, replacing Aaron Hughes in the 77th minute in the final match of the 2008–09 season, a 2–0 home loss to Everton. Smalling made his first start for Fulham on 17 September 2009, in an away tie with CSKA Sofia in the UEFA Europa League, with the match ending 1–1. On 28 December 2009, Smalling made his first league start for Fulham, in a 2–1 loss against Chelsea at Stamford Bridge in Fulham's final match of 2009 and scored a decisive own goal in the 75th minute of the match. He was not included in the matchday squad for the 2010 UEFA Europa League Final, in which Fulham were beaten 2–1 after extra time by Atlético Madrid at the Volksparkstadion.

=== Manchester United ===
==== 2010–2013 ====
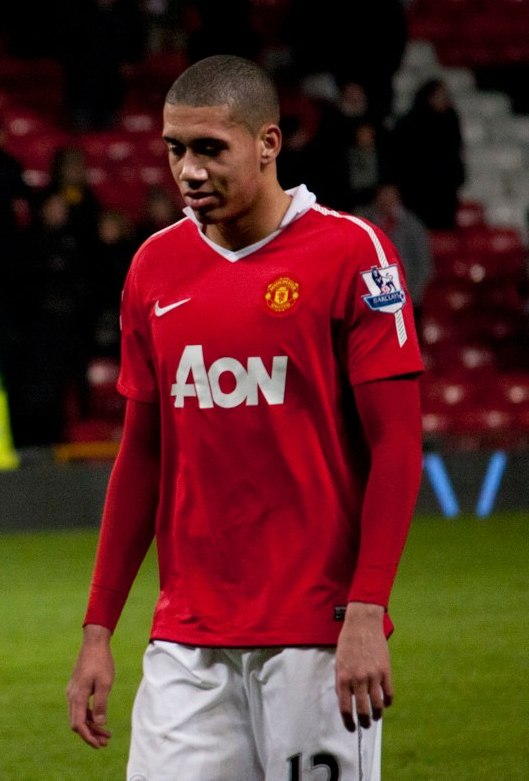
Smalling playing for Manchester United in 2011

On 27 January 2010, Manchester United announced that they had signed Smalling, for an undisclosed fee, with the player staying at Fulham for the remainder of the 2009–10 season before joining United for the beginning of the 2010–11 campaign. The transfer officially went through on 1 July 2010.

Smalling made his debut for United on 8 August 2010 in the 2010 FA Community Shield, appearing as a second-half substitute in a 3–1 win over Chelsea. His Premier League debut for United came in their 3–0 home win over West Ham United on 28 August 2010, coming on as a 74th-minute substitute for Jonny Evans. On 15 September 2010, he made his UEFA Champions League debut, playing the full 90 minutes in a 0–0 draw at home against Rangers. Eight days later, Smalling scored his first goal for Manchester United, also his first senior career goal, in a 5–2 away win over Scunthorpe United in the League Cup. Smalling then made his full Premier League debut for United on 4 January 2011, partnering Nemanja Vidić for the full 90 minutes in a 2–1 home win against Stoke City.

On 8 July 2011, Smalling signed a new five-year contract with United. Smalling scored his first goal of the 2011–12 season in the 2011 FA Community Shield against United's local rivals Manchester City, volleying in an Ashley Young free kick from close range to reduce the deficit to 2–1. Manchester United went on to win the match 3–2 and take the Shield. The new season also saw Smalling adapt to a new role, as early injuries to Nemanja Vidić and Rio Ferdinand allowed Smalling, Jonny Evans and new signing Phil Jones to replace them. Evans and Jones played as central defenders, whereas Smalling was deployed as a right-back. Smalling scored his first ever Premier League goal, against Chelsea at Old Trafford, on 18 September 2011, rising unmarked to place a header into the far corner to open the scoring in a match United went on to win 3–1. Smalling was ruled out of the last Premier League fixture of the season and also for England's UEFA Euro 2012 campaign due to a groin injury he sustained during Manchester United's 2–0 win over Swansea City in the penultimate week of the league season.

On 21 July 2012, it was announced that Smalling would miss the start of the season after being ruled out for 10 weeks after undergoing surgery on a broken metatarsal. The injury had ruled him out of the entire pre-season tour. He made his return on 7 November 2012, playing the full 90 minutes in a 3–1 win away to Portuguese team Braga in the Champions League. He made his Premier League return three days later, helping his team to a 3–2 win against Aston Villa.

==== 2013–2016 ====
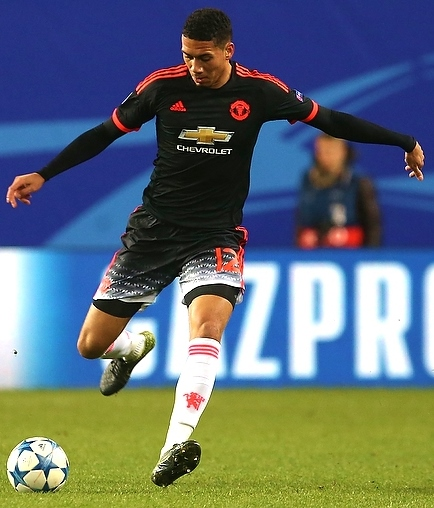
Smalling playing for Manchester United in 2015

On 27 November 2013, Smalling scored his first Champions League goal in a 5–0 win away to Bayer Leverkusen. On 26 December 2013, he scored in a 3–2 win against Hull City.

Smalling was sent off in the first half of United's 1–0 defeat in the Manchester derby on 2 November 2014. Manager Louis van Gaal deemed Smalling "stupid" for his second yellow card in the match, awarded for a foul on James Milner. On 29 November 2014, he scored his first Premier League goal of the season in a 3–0 victory over Hull City at Old Trafford, it was also his first Old Trafford goal in three years.

On 11 February 2015, Smalling became the first player in the history of the Premier League to score two first-half goals as a substitute, after appearing as a 5th-minute substitute in a 3–1 victory against Burnley. This entered Smalling into the Guinness Book of Records for "the fastest goal in the Premier League by a substitute from kick-off" and "the most goals in the Premier League scored by a substitute in the first half". On 12 April 2015, he scored his fourth league goal of the season in a 4–2 win over Manchester City. Nine days later, Smalling signed a new contract with Manchester United, keeping him at the club until June 2019. Having been praised by manager Louis van Gaal for his command of the defensive unit, Smalling captained United for the first time on 17 May 2015 during a 1–1 draw against Arsenal. On 2 May 2016, Smalling won the Manchester United Players' Player of the Year award. Later that month, on 21 May, he was sent off against Crystal Palace in the 2016 FA Cup Final, which Manchester United won 2–1 after extra time.

==== 2016–2019 ====
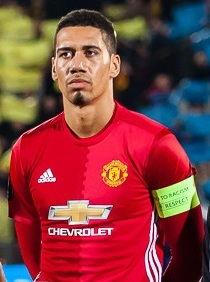
Smalling lining up for Manchester United in 2017

He scored his first goal of the 2016–17 season on 24 September with a 22nd-minute header which opened the scoring in a 4–1 victory over reigning Premier League champions, Leicester City. Smalling's first goal of the 2017–18 season came in a 4–1 win over Newcastle United on 18 November 2017. Smalling's next goal didn't come until 5 March 2018 in a 3–2 comeback win over Crystal Palace. He scored again a month later, scoring the derby winner in a 3–2 comeback victory over Manchester City. Smalling scored his final goal of the season in a 2–0 away victory over AFC Bournemouth.

Smalling's only goal and what ending up being his final United goal of the 2018–19 season came in a 2–1 victory over Watford on 15 September 2018, which was regarded as "one of the best goals of his career" by the Manchester Evening News. On 15 December, Smalling signed a new contract with Manchester United, keeping him at the club until June 2022. This came a week after sustaining a foot injury in United's 4–1 home win over Fulham keeping the defender out until he returned to training prior to the reverse fixture in February. Following his return, Smalling received criticism for his overly physical playing style with former Irish footballer Tony Cascarino saying "[he] will be in trouble when video assistant referees are introduced to the Premier League" next season.

=== Roma ===
On 30 August 2019, Smalling joined Serie A club Roma on loan for the 2019–20 season, with the club paying €3 million to sign him. On 24 November 2019, he became the first English player to score at least two goals in the same Serie A campaign since David Beckham during the 2008–09 season, and third overall since 2000 after Jay Bothroyd in the 2003–04 season. On 5 October 2020, Smalling signed for Roma permanently on a three-year contract for an initial €15 million fee, potentially rising to €20 million with add-ons. On 25 May 2022, Smalling was named man of the match in the 2022 UEFA Europa Conference League Final, which Roma won 1–0 against Feyenoord in Tirana, Albania, to become the inaugural winners of the competition.

On 16 June 2023, Smalling signed a new contract with Roma until 2025.

=== Al-Fayha ===
On 2 September 2024, Smalling joined Saudi side Al-Fayha by signing a two-year contract. On 14 September, he made his debut in a 5–0 home defeat against Al Raed, where he scored an own goal and was shown a straight red card.

=== Porto ===
On 30 September 2026, Smalling signed for Porto on a free transfer, on a deal until the end of the Primeira Liga season with the option of another season.

== International career ==
=== Youth ===
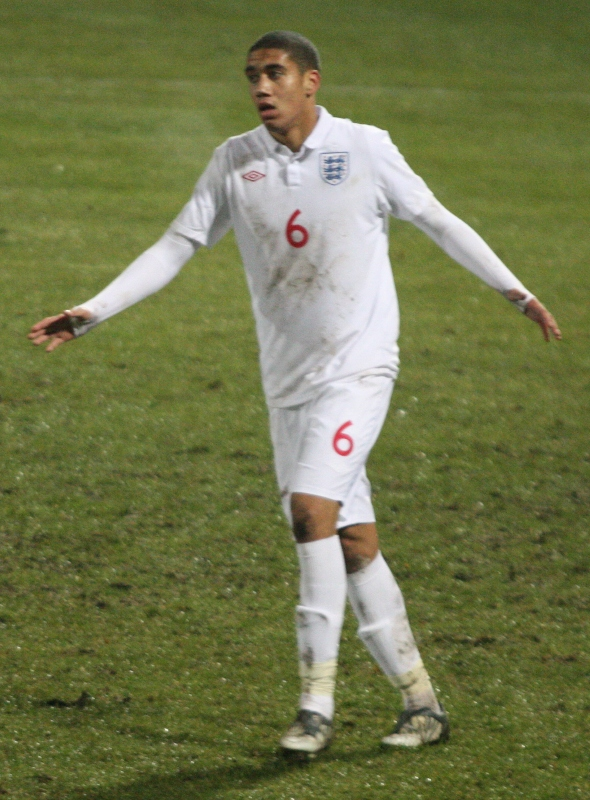
Smalling playing for England U21 in 2009

At the age of 17 and studying for his A Levels, Smalling was selected to represent his county (Kent), and the Kent Schools' Football Association then nominated him for trials for the England Schoolboy international squad. His trial was successful, and Smalling was selected to represent England Schools against Australia in January 2008. England won 2–0, and Smalling went on to play for England in the Centenary Shield, playing all four matches which including 1–0 victory against Wales Schools in which he scored the only goal.

Smalling made his debut for the England under-20 team 31 March 2009, playing 45 minutes in a 2–0 win against Italy at Loftus Road. On 11 August, four months after his under-20 debut, he made his debut for the under-21 squad in a friendly fixture against the Netherlands, coming on as a substitute in the 58th minute of a 0–0 away draw. On 14 November, Smalling made first start for the under-21s in a 2011 UEFA European Under-21 Championship qualifier against Portugal at Wembley Stadium in a 1–0 win. He scored his first goal for the under-21s on 8 October 2010, against Romania, in England's 2011 UEFA European Under-21 Championship qualification play-off first leg, converting from inside the area after an assist from Daniel Sturridge. The goal, scored in the 83rd minute, proved to be the winner as England won 2–1.

=== Senior ===
On 13 November 2010, Smalling was called up to the England senior squad for the first time for their friendly against France on 17 November; however, he was an unused substitute in the 2–1 loss. He made his senior debut in the UEFA Euro 2012 qualifier against Bulgaria on 2 September 2011, which England won 3–0, in which he played at right-back.

On 12 May 2014, Smalling was named in England's 23-man squad for the 2014 FIFA World Cup. With England's elimination from the group stages already confirmed, Smalling was given a tournament debut as a starter in the final group match, helping the team to a clean sheet in a 0–0 draw with Costa Rica in Belo Horizonte.

On 31 May 2016, Smalling was named in England's 23-man squad for UEFA Euro 2016. On 2 June 2016, in England's final warm-up match for Euro 2016, he scored his first goal for England in a 1–0 victory over Portugal.

Smalling was dropped by England manager Gareth Southgate in November 2017, as Southgate felt players such as John Stones, Harry Maguire and Eric Dier were better at initiating the play. Smalling registered his surprise and responded, "I'm as good a defender as anyone." He was not included in the squad for the 2018 FIFA World Cup.

== Personal life ==
In June 2017, Smalling married model Sam Cooke near Lake Como, Italy. They have a son, Leo, born in May 2019.

Inspired by his wife, he became vegan, which he credits for improving his health and reducing his recovery time. He had cut out red meat prior to becoming vegan. Smalling has promoted the vegan diet and kindness to animals through advertisements for PETA.

In February 2019, he became a patron of education charity Football Beyond Borders. On 16 April 2021, Smalling and his family were robbed by armed men in their home in southern Rome. The thieves took luxury watches and jewellery in an early morning raid.

== Career statistics ==
=== Club ===
As of match played 28 October 2026

Appearances and goals by club, season and competition
Club	Season	League			National cup (Note: Includes FA Cup, Coppa Italia, King's Cup)		League cup (Note: Includes Football League/EFL Cup)		Continental		Other		Total	
Club	Season	Division	Apps	Goals	Apps	Goals	Apps	Goals	Apps	Goals	Apps	Goals	Apps	Goals
Maidstone United	2006–07	Isthmian League Division One South	0	0	0	0	—		—		1 (Note: Appearance in Kent Senior Cup)	0	1	0
Maidstone United	2007–08	Isthmian League Premier Division	12	1	0	0	—		—		3 (Note: Two appearances in FA Trophy, one appearance in Isthmian League Cup)	0	15	1
Maidstone United	Total		12	1	0	0	—		—		4	0	16	1
Fulham	2008–09	Premier League	1	0	0	0	0	0	—		—		1	0
Fulham	2009–10	Premier League	12	0	1	0	1	0	4 (Note: Appearances in UEFA Europa League)	0	—		18	0
Fulham	Total		13	0	1	0	1	0	4	0	—		19	0
Manchester United	2010–11	Premier League	16	0	4	0	3	1	9 (Note: Appearances in UEFA Champions League)	0	1 (Note: Appearance in FA Community Shield)	0	33	1
Manchester United	2011–12	Premier League	19	1	2	0	1	0	7 (Note: Four appearances in UEFA Champions League, three appearances in UEFA Europa League)	0	1	1	30	2
Manchester United	2012–13	Premier League	15	0	5	0	0	0	2	0	—		22	0
Manchester United	2013–14	Premier League	25	1	1	0	4	0	7	1	1	0	38	2
Manchester United	2014–15	Premier League	25	4	4	0	0	0	—		—		29	4
Manchester United	2015–16	Premier League	35	0	7	1	2	0	11 (Note: Eight appearances and one goal in UEFA Champions League, three appearances in UEFA Europa League)	1	—		55	2
Manchester United	2016–17	Premier League	18	1	4	1	4	0	10	0	0	0	36	2
Manchester United	2017–18	Premier League	29	4	5	0	3	0	8	0	1 (Note: Appearance in UEFA Super Cup)	0	46	4
Manchester United	2018–19	Premier League	24	1	2	0	0	0	8	0	—		34	1
Manchester United	Total		206	12	34	2	17	1	62	2	4	1	323	18
Roma (loan)	2019–20	Serie A	30	3	2	0	—		5	0	—		37	3
Roma	2020–21	Serie A	16	0	0	0	—		5	0	—		21	0
Roma	2021–22	Serie A	27	3	1	0	—		10 (Note: Appearances in UEFA Europa Conference League)	1	—		38	4
Roma	2022–23	Serie A	32	3	1	0	—		14	0	—		47	3
Roma	2023–24	Serie A	8	0	0	0	—		4	0	—		12	0
Roma	Roma total		113	9	4	0	—		38	1	—		155	10
Al-Fayha	2024–25	Saudi Pro League	30	1	2	0	—		—		—		32	1
Al-Fayha	2025–26	Saudi Pro League	34	3	1	0	—		—		—		35	3
Al-Fayha	Total		64	4	3	0	—		—		—		67	4
Porto	2026–27	Primeira Liga	0	0	0	0	1	0	0	0	—		1	0
Career total			408	26	42	2	19	1	104	3	8	1	581	33

=== International ===
As of match played 10 June 2017

Appearances and goals by national team and year
National team	Year	Apps	Goals
England	2011	2	0
England	2012	1	0
England	2013	6	0
England	2014	6	0
England	2015	6	0
England	2016	8	1
England	2017	2	0
Total		31	1

As of match played 10 June 2017. England score listed first, score column indicates score after each Smalling goal.

List of international goals scored by Chris Smalling
No.	Date	Venue	Cap	Opponent	Score	Result	Competition	Ref.
1	2 June 2016	Wembley Stadium, London, England	25	Portugal	1–0	1–0	Friendly	

== Honours ==
Manchester United

- Premier League: 2010–11, 2012–13
- FA Cup: 2015–16; runner-up: 2017–18
- EFL Cup: 2016–17
- FA Community Shield: 2010, 2011, 2013
- UEFA Europa League: 2016–17
- UEFA Champions League runner up: 2010–11

Roma

- UEFA Europa Conference League: 2021–22
- UEFA Europa League runner-up: 2022–23

Individual

- UEFA European Under-21 Championship Team of the Tournament: 2011
- Manchester United Players' Player of the Year: 2015–16
- UEFA Europa Conference League Team of the Season: 2021–22
- UEFA Europa League Team of the Season: 2022–23
