= Manuel Cedenilla =

Spanish footballer

Personal information
- Full name: Jesús Manuel Cedenilla Moreno
- Date of birth: 13 February 1998 (age 28)
- Place of birth: Talavera de la Reina, Spain
- Height: 1.76 m (5 ft 9 in)
- Position: Left back

Team information
- Current team: Palm City
- Number: 12

Youth career
- 2005–2006: Azulejos Ramos
- 2006–2016: Real Madrid
- 2016–2018: Málaga

Senior career*
Years	Team	Apps	(Gls)
2018–2019	Alcorcón B	37	(0)
2019	Alcorcón	1	(0)
2019–2020	Las Rozas	19	(1)
2020–2021	Badajoz	8	(0)
2021–2022	Tudelano	31	(0)
2022–2023	Lanzarote	12	(0)
2023	Langreo	15	(1)
2023–2024	Guijuelo	29	(0)
2024–2025	Coria	32	(0)
2025–	Palm City		
- * Club domestic league appearances and goals as of 4 May 2025

Jesús Manuel Cedenilla Moreno (born 13 February 1998) is a Spanish footballer who plays for Emirati club Palm City as a left back.

== Club career ==
Born in Talavera de la Reina, Toledo, Castilla–La Mancha, Cedenilla joined Real Madrid's youth setup in 2006, from Azulejos Ramos FS. In August 2016, after overcoming a cancer, he joined Málaga CF.

On 16 January 2018, Cedenilla joined AD Alcorcón and was assigned to the reserves in the Tercera División. He made his senior debut twelve days later, coming on as a second-half substitute in a 5–0 away routing of CF San Agustín del Guadalix.

Cedenilla made his first team debut on 1 June 2019, starting in a 0–1 home loss against Gimnàstic de Tarragona in the Segunda División.
