= Fashion Sakala =

Zambian footballer (born 1997)

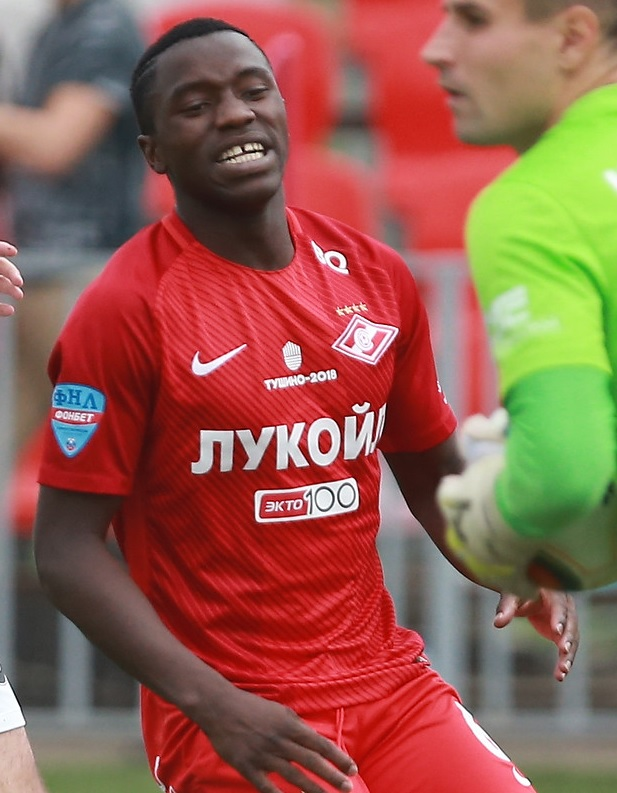
- Sakala with Spartak-2 Moscow in 2017

Personal information
- Full name: Junior Fashion Sakala
- Date of birth: 14 March 1997 (age 29)
- Place of birth: Chipata, Zambia
- Height: 1.78 m (5 ft 10 in)
- Position: Forward

Team information
- Current team: Al-Fayha
- Number: 10

Senior career*
Years	Team	Apps	(Gls)
2015–2016	Nchanga Rangers		
2016–2017	Zanaco		
2017–2018	Spartak-2 Moscow	35	(10)
2017–2018	Spartak Moscow	0	(0)
2018–2021	KV Oostende	80	(24)
2021–2023	Rangers	59	(21)
2023–	Al-Fayha	101	(43)

International career^{‡}
2017	Zambia U20	10	(7)
2019	Zambia U23	1	(0)
2017–	Zambia	42	(12)
- * Club domestic league appearances and goals as of 18:00, 31 October 2026 (UTC) ‡ National team caps and goals as of 23:00, 25 September 2026 (UTC)

Junior Fashion Sakala (born 14 March 1997) is a Zambian professional footballer who plays as a forward for Saudi Pro League club Al-Fayha and the Zambia national team.

Sakala played for Zambian clubs Nchanga Rangers and Zanaco, winning the Zambia Super League in 2016 with the latter. He signed for Spartak Moscow in February 2017. Sakala made no first-team appearances for the club, instead appearing for Spartak-2 Moscow in the second tier of Russian football. He joined Belgian club KV Oostende in July 2018, where he scored 31 goals in 102 appearances over three seasons. He joined Rangers on a free transfer in 2021, where he won the Scottish Cup and scored 24 goals in 91 appearances.

Sakala was a member of the Zambia under-20 team that won the 2017 Africa U-20 Cup of Nations. He made his senior international debut in September 2017.

== Club career ==
=== Early career ===
Sakala began his senior career in Zambia with Nchanga Rangers and Zanaco. He helped Zanaco win the Zambia Super League in 2016. In February 2017, he signed a three-year contract with Russian Premier League club FC Spartak Moscow, after being invited for a trial at their training camp in Cyprus. He made his debut in the Russian Football National League for FC Spartak-2 Moscow on 23 March 2017, in a game against FC Baltika Kaliningrad.

On 9 July 2018, he signed a three-year contract with Belgian club KV Oostende.

=== Rangers ===
On 4 May 2021, with his Oostende contract due to expire in the summer, Sakala signed a pre-contract agreement with Scottish Premiership club Rangers on a four-year deal. On 31 July, he made his official debut in a 3–0 win over Livingston in the league. On 31 October, he scored his first hat-trick for Rangers in a 6–1 league victory over Motherwell. On 4 October 2022, Sakala made his UEFA Champions League debut as a substitute in a 2–0 away loss against Liverpool.

=== Al-Fayha ===
On 8 August 2023, Sakala joined Saudi Pro League club Al-Fayha on a two-year contract.

On 11 January 2025, in a game vs Al-Ittihad Sakala scored to become Al-Fayha's all time top goal scorer in the RSL, with 24 goals, surpassing Ronnie Fernandez and Danilo Asprilla.

== International career ==
=== Youth level ===
Sakala played youth international football for Zambia at under-20 and under-23 levels. He featured for the Zambia under-20 team that won the 2017 Africa U-20 Cup of Nations, scoring three goals at the tournament. He also played for the under-20 team that reached the quarter-finals of the 2017 FIFA U-20 World Cup, scoring four goals in the tournament. He scored seven goals in ten appearances in total at under-20 level. Sakala played one game for the Zambia under-23 team, against Nigeria at the 2019 Africa U-23 Cup of Nations.

=== Senior level ===
Sakala made his debut for the senior Zambia national team on 2 September 2017, in a 2018 FIFA World Cup qualifier against Algeria, and was sent off for two bookings in the 56th minute.

In December 2023, he was included in the squad of twenty-seven Zambian players selected by Avram Grant to compete in the 2023 Africa Cup of Nations.

On 10 December 2025, Sakala was called up to the Zambia squad for the 2025 Africa Cup of Nations.

== Career statistics ==
=== Club ===
As of match played 3 March 2026

Appearances and goals by club, season and competition
Club	Season	League			National cup (Note: Includes Belgian Cup, Scottish Cup, King Cup)		League cup (Note: Includes Scottish League Cup)		Continental		Other		Total	
Club	Season	Division	Apps	Goals	Apps	Goals	Apps	Goals	Apps	Goals	Apps	Goals	Apps	Goals
Spartak-2 Moscow	2016–17	Russian Football National League	4	0	—		—		—		—		4	0
Spartak-2 Moscow	2017–18	Russian Football National League	31	10	—		—		—		—		31	10
Spartak-2 Moscow	Total		35	10	—		—		—		—		35	10
KV Oostende	2018–19	Belgian Pro League	24	3	5	1	—		—		9 (Note: Appearances in Belgian Pro League European play-offs)	2	38	6
KV Oostende	2019–20	Belgian Pro League	28	8	2	1	—		—		—		30	9
KV Oostende	2020–21	Belgian Pro League	28	13	1	0	—		—		5	3	34	16
KV Oostende	Total		80	24	8	2	—		—		14	5	102	31
Rangers	2021–22	Scottish Premiership	30	9	5	3	2	0	13 (Note: Two appearances in UEFA Champions League, eleven appearances in UEFA Europa League)	0	—		50	12
Rangers	2022–23	Scottish Premiership	29	12	3	0	4	0	5 (Note: Appearances in UEFA Champions League)	0	—		41	12
Rangers	Total		59	21	8	3	6	0	18	0	—		91	24
Al-Fayha	2023–24	Saudi Pro League	31	19	2	0	—		8 (Note: Appearances in AFC Champions League)	3	—		41	22
Al-Fayha	2024–25	Saudi Pro League	31	8	3	0	—		—		—		34	8
Al-Fayha	2025–26	Saudi Pro League	22	10	1	0	—		—		—		23	10
Al-Fayha	Total		84	37	6	0	—		8	3	—		97	40
Career total			258	92	22	5	6	0	26	3	14	5	326	105

=== International ===
As of match played 25 September 2026

Appearances and goals by national team and year
National team	Year	Apps	Goals
Zambia	2017	3	0
Zambia	2018	3	0
Zambia	2019	3	1
Zambia	2020	4	0
Zambia	2021	4	5
Zambia	2022	4	0
Zambia	2023	7	3
Zambia	2024	4	0
Zambia	2025	8	2
Zambia	2026	2	1
Total		42	12

Scores and results list Zambia's goal tally first, score column indicates score after each Sakala goal.

List of international goals scored by Fashion Sakala
No.	Date	Venue	Opponent	Score	Result	Competition
1	19 June 2019	Zayed Sports City Stadium, Abu Dhabi, United Arab Emirates	Ivory Coast	1–0	1–4	Friendly
2	10 October 2021	National Heroes Stadium, Lusaka, Zambia	Equatorial Guinea	1–0	1–1	2022 FIFA World Cup qualification
3	13 November 2021	National Heroes Stadium, Lusaka, Zambia	Mauritania	2–0	4–0	2022 FIFA World Cup qualification
4	13 November 2021	National Heroes Stadium, Lusaka, Zambia	Mauritania	3–0	4–0	2022 FIFA World Cup qualification
5	13 November 2021	National Heroes Stadium, Lusaka, Zambia	Mauritania	4–0	4–0	2022 FIFA World Cup qualification
6	16 November 2021	Hammadi Agrebi Stadium, Tunis, Tunisia	Tunisia	1–3	1–3	2022 FIFA World Cup qualification
7	23 March 2023	Levy Mwanawasa Stadium, Ndola, Zambia	Lesotho	1–1	3–1	2023 Africa Cup of Nations qualification
8	17 October 2023	Al Hamriya Sports Club Stadium, Al Hamriyah, United Arab Emirates	Uganda	2–0	3–0	Friendly
9	17 November 2023	Levy Mwanawasa Stadium, Ndola, Zambia	Congo	3–2	4–2	2026 FIFA World Cup qualification
10	8 October 2025	Amaan Stadium, Zanzibar City, Tanzania	Tanzania	1–0	1–0	2026 FIFA World Cup qualification
11	18 November 2025	11 November Stadium, Luanda, Angola	Angola	2–2	2–3	Friendly
12	25 September 2026	Hocine Aït Ahmed Stadium, Tizi Ouzou, Algeria	Algeria	1–1	1–3	2027 Africa Cup of Nations qualification

== Honours ==
Zanaco

- Zambia Super League: 2016

Rangers

- Scottish Cup: 2021–22
- Scottish League Cup runner-up: 2022–23
- UEFA Europa League runner-up: 2021–22

Zambia U20

- Africa U-20 Cup of Nations: 2017
- COSAFA U-20 Cup: 2016
