= UAE Federation Cup =

- Founded: 1985; 41 years ago
- Region: United Arab Emirates
- Teams: 32
- Related competitions: League Cup
- Current champions: Palm City (1st title)
- Most championships: Al Nasr (4 titles)

The UAE FA cup (Arabic: كأس الاتحاد الإماراتي) is a United Arab Emirates football tournament for UAE Football League teams. Starting from the 2008-09 season or whats known as the Pro Era this tournament was replaced with UAE League Cup and it became a second tier tournament for First Division League, later returned in a new format in 2025-26.

== Winners ==
=== UAE Federation Cup ===
Years	Winner	Result	Runners-up
1984–85	Al Shabab	1–0	Al Wasl
1985–86	Al Wahda	4–1	Al Ain
1987–88	Al Nasr	4–1	Al Wasl
1988–89	Al Ain	1–0	Al Wasl
1992–93	Al Wasl	2–0	Al Ahli
1994–95	Al Wahda	3–0	Al Wasl
1999–00	Al Nasr	3–2	Al Wahda
2000–01	Al Wahda	3–1	Al Shabab
2001–02	Al Nasr	1–0	Al Ahli
2004–05	Al Ain	1–1 (a.e.t., 10–9 pens.)	Al Ahli
2005–06	Al Ain	4–1	Al Wahda
2006–07	Al Jazira	4–1	Al Ahli

=== UAE Vice President Cup ===
Years	Winner	Result	Runners-up
2009–10	Dubai	2–2 (a.e.t., 5–3 pens.)	Al Shaab
2010–11	Ajman	2–1	Dibba Al Fujairah
2011–12	Al Dhafra	2–0	Ittihad Kalba
2014–15	Dubai	4–2	Dibba Al Fujairah
2015–16	Ajman	Round robin	Ittihad Kalba

=== UAE FA Cup ===
Years	Winners	Result	Runners-up
2025–26	Palm City FC	1–1 (a.e.t., 4–1 pens.)	Hatta FC

== Performance by club ==
Club	Winners	Runners-up	Winning years	Runner-up years
Al Ain	3	2	1989, 2005, 2006	1986, 1994
Al Wahda	3	2	1986, 1995, 2001	2000, 2006
Al Nasr	3	0	1988, 2000, 2002	–
Al Wasl	1	4	1993	1985, 1988, 1989, 1995
Ajman	2	0	2011, 2016	–
Dubai	2	0	2010, 2015	–
Al Shabab	1	1	1985	2001
Al Dhafra	1	0	2012	–
Al Jazira	1	0	2007	–
Ittihad Kalba	0	2	–	2012, 2016
Dibba Al Fujairah	0	2	–	2011, 2015
Al Shaab	0	1	–	2010
