= Stylianos Vrontis =

Cypriot footballer (born 2004)

Personal information
- Date of birth: 4 November 2004 (age 21)
- Place of birth: Nicosia, Cyprus
- Position: Midfielder

Team information
- Current team: APOEL
- Number: 6

Youth career
- –2021: APOEL

Senior career*
Years	Team	Apps	(Gls)
2021–	APOEL	7	(0)
2022–2023	→ POX (loan)	24	(6)
2024–2025	→ Omonia Aradippou (loan)	18	(0)
2025–2026	→ Al-Fayha (loan)	8	(0)

International career^{‡}
2019	Cyprus U16	2	(0)
2021–2022	Cyprus U19	14	(2)
2023–	Cyprus U21	16	(0)
- * Club domestic league appearances and goals as of 31 August 2025 ‡ National team caps and goals as of 9 September 2025

Stylianos Vrontis (Greek: Στέλιου Βρόντη; born 5 November 2004) is a Cypriot professional footballer who plays as a midfielder for APOEL.

== Club career ==
As a youth player, Vrontis joined the youth academy of Cypriot side APOEL and was promoted to the club's senior team in 2021. Cypriot news website Kerkida.net wrote in 2025 that he was "considered the 'next best thing' in the Cypriot element of APOEL" while playing for them. In 2022, he was sent on loan to Cypriot side POX, where he made twenty-four league appearances and scored six goals.

Ahead of the 2024–25 season, he signed for Cypriot side Omonia Aradippou, where he suffered an injury and made eighteen league appearances and scored zero goals. Subsequently, he was sent on loan to Saudi Arabian side Al-Fayha in 2025.

== International career ==
Vrontis is a Cyprus youth international. During the summer of 2025, he played for the Cyprus national under-21 football team for 2027 UEFA European Under-21 Championship qualification.
