= Renzo López =

Uruguayan footballer (born 1994)

Personal information
- Full name: Renzo López Patrón
- Date of birth: 16 April 1994 (age 32)
- Place of birth: Montevideo, Uruguay
- Height: 1.92 m (6 ft 4 in)
- Position: Forward

Team information
- Current team: Ceará
- Number: 94

Youth career
- Nacional

Senior career*
Years	Team	Apps	(Gls)
2012–2017	Nacional	0	(0)
2012–2013	→ Rentistas (loan)	18	(2)
2014	→ Rentistas (loan)	2	(0)
2015–2016	→ Racing MVD (loan)	23	(3)
2016	→ Sud América (loan)	13	(4)
2017	→ Extremadura (loan)	9	(0)
2017–2022	Plaza Colonia	28	(13)
2018	→ Kyoto Sanga (loan)	37	(11)
2019	→ O'Higgins (loan)	12	(1)
2020	→ Sagan Tosu (loan)	14	(3)
2021	→ Montevideo Wanderers (loan)	14	(4)
2022	→ Central Córdoba SdE (loan)	30	(16)
2023	Al-Batin	18	(8)
2023	Tigre	7	(0)
2024	Independiente del Valle	14	(6)
2024–2025	Al-Fayha	27	(8)
2025–2026	Vitória	29	(1)
2026–	Ceará	13	(0)
- * Club domestic league appearances and goals as of 18 November 2026

Renzo López Patrón (born 16 April 1994) is a Uruguayan professional footballer who plays as a forward for Ceará.

== Career ==
After playing several seasons in Uruguay, Renzo López signed on loan for Extremadura UD. His stint to Spain didn't last more than one year, but he managed to sign in December 2017 for another loan outside South America, this time to Japan and to Kyoto Sanga.

In March 2021, he signed a one-year loan deal with Montevideo Wanderers, a division rival to the club he was loaned from, Plaza Colonia.

On 7 January 2023, López joined Saudi Arabian club Al-Batin.

On 28 July 2023, López joined Tigre.

On 2 September 2024, López joined Al-Fayha.
