= Gabriel Vareta =

Brazilian footballer

Personal information
- Full name: Gabriel dos Santos da Silva
- Date of birth: 16 May 2005 (age 21)
- Place of birth: São Paulo, Brazil
- Height: 1.87 m (6 ft 2 in)
- Position: Centre-back

Team information
- Current team: Al Wasl
- Number: 25

Youth career
- 2013–2025: Palmeiras

Senior career*
Years	Team	Apps	(Gls)
2025	Palmeiras	0	(0)
2025	→ Al-Fahya (loan)	12	(0)
2025–	Al Wasl	0	(0)
- * Club domestic league appearances and goals as of 11 May 2025

Gabriel dos Santos da Silva (born 16 May 2005), commonly known as Gabriel Vareta, is a Brazilian professional footballer who plays as a centre-back for UAE club Al Wasl.

== Club career ==
He progressed through the club's youth system, winning multiple youth titles, most notably captaining the team to victory in the 2022 Copa do Brasil Sub-17.

On 31 January 2025, Vareta was loaned to Saudi Pro League side Al-Fayha until the end of the 2024–25 season, in a deal that does not include a purchase option.

On 23 July 2025, Vareta joined UAE Pro League club Al Wasl on a three-year contract.

== Career statistics ==
As of 11 May 2025

Club	Season	League	Apps	Goals	Cup	Apps	Goals	Total	Apps	Goals
Al-Fayha	2024–25	Saudi Pro League	12	0	–	–	10	0		
Career total			12	0	–	–	10	0		
