= 2023–24 Al-Fayha FC season =

Al-Fayha
2023–24 season
- President: Tawfiq Al-Modaiheem
- Manager: Vuk Rašović
- Stadium: Al Majma'ah Sports City
- Pro League: 9th
- King's Cup: Round of 16 (knocked out by Al-Ittihad)
- Champions League: Round of 16 (knocked out by Al-Nassr)
- Top goalscorer: League: Fashion Sakala (19); All: Fashion Sakala (22)
- Highest home attendance: 10,081 (vs. Al-Ittihad, 29 September 2023)
- Lowest home attendance: 133 (vs. Ahal, 28 November 2023)
- Average home league attendance: 2,301
- All statistics correct as of 27 May 2024.

The 2023–24 season was Al-Fayha's 70th year in their existence and their sixth non-consecutive season in the Pro League. The club participated in the Pro League, the King Cup, and the AFC Champions League.

The season covers the period from 1 July 2023 to 30 June 2024.

== Players ==
=== Squad information ===
As of 1 February 2024

Note: Flags indicate national team as defined under FIFA eligibility rules; some limited exceptions apply. Players may hold more than one non-FIFA nationality.

No.	Pos.	Nation	Player
1	GK	KSA	Abdulraouf Al-Duqay
2	DF	KSA	Mukhair Al-Rashidi
3	DF	CIV	Ghislain Konan (on loan from Al-Nassr)
4	DF	KSA	Sami Al-Khaibari (captain)
6	MF	KSA	Saud Zidan
7	FW	NGR	Henry Onyekuru
8	MF	KSA	Abdulrahman Al-Safri
9	FW	NGR	Anthony Nwakaeme
11	MF	KSA	Khalid Kaabi
12	DF	KSA	Yousef Haqawi (on loan from Al-Nassr)
13	MF	BIH	Gojko Cimirot
17	FW	ZAM	Fashion Sakala
19	FW	KSA	Mohammed Majrashi
22	DF	KSA	Mohammed Al-Baqawi
27	MF	KSA	Sultan Mandash
29	MF	KSA	Nawaf Al-Harthi

No.	Pos.	Nation	Player
33	DF	KSA	Hussein Al-Shuwaish
34	GK	KSA	Osama Al-Thumairy
37	MF	BRA	Ricardo Ryller
40	DF	KSA	Mohammed Al-Dowaish
45	FW	KSA	Sattam Al-Lehyani
49	FW	KSA	Ali Al Jubaya
62	DF	KSA	Hossam Majrashi
66	MF	KSA	Rakan Kaabi
70	MF	KSA	Abdulrahman Al-Enezi
75	DF	KSA	Khalid Al-Rammah
77	MF	MAR	Abdelhamid Sabiri (on loan from Fiorentina)
80	DF	KSA	Osama Al-Khalaf
88	GK	SRB	Vladimir Stojković
96	GK	KSA	Abdulaziz Al-Murdhi
98	DF	KSA	Muhannad Al-Qaydhi
99	FW	KSA	Malek Al-Abdulmenem

=== Out on loan ===
Note: Flags indicate national team as defined under FIFA eligibility rules; some limited exceptions apply. Players may hold more than one non-FIFA nationality.

No.	Pos.	Nation	Player
5	DF	KSA	Naif Almas (at Al-Orobah until 30 June 2024)
14	DF	KSA	Sultan Al-Harbi (at Al-Qaisumah until 30 June 2024)

No.	Pos.	Nation	Player
21	DF	KSA	Sultan Al-Harbi (at Al-Taraji until 30 June 2024)

== Transfers and loans ==
=== Transfers in ===
Entry date	Position	No.	Player	From club	Fee	Ref.
1 July 2023	GK	28	(Saudi Arabia) Ahmed Al-Kassar	(Saudi Arabia) Al-Faisaly	Free	
3 July 2023	MF	29	(Saudi Arabia) Nawaf Al-Harthi	(Saudi Arabia) Al-Ain	Free	
3 July 2023	MF	70	(Saudi Arabia) Abdulrahman Al-Enezi	(Saudi Arabia) Al-Orobah	Free	
12 July 2023	MF	13	(Bosnia and Herzegovina) Gojko Cimirot	(Belgium) Standard Liège	Free	
3 August 2023	GK	1	(Saudi Arabia) Abdulraouf Al-Daqeel	(Saudi Arabia) Hajer	Free	
3 August 2023	DF	21	(Saudi Arabia) Muteb Al-Khaldi	(Saudi Arabia) Al-Qadsiah	Free	
8 August 2023	FW	17	(Zambia) Fashion Sakala	(Scotland) Rangers	$5,100,000	
11 August 2023	FW	7	(Nigeria) Henry Onyekuru	(Turkey) Adana Demirspor	$3,500,000	
7 September 2023	MF	66	(Saudi Arabia) Rakan Kaabi	(Saudi Arabia) Al-Ettifaq	Free	

=== Loans in ===
Start date	End date	Position	No.	Player	From club	Fee	Ref.
4 September 2023	End of season	DF	3	(Ivory Coast) Ghislain Konan	(Saudi Arabia) Al-Nassr	None	
7 September 2023	End of season	DF	12	(Saudi Arabia) Yousef Haqawi	(Saudi Arabia) Al-Nassr	None	
7 September 2023	End of season	MF	77	(Morocco) Abdelhamid Sabiri	(Italy) Fiorentina	$320,000	

=== Transfers out ===
Exit date	Position	No.	Player	To club	Fee	Ref.
30 June 2023	MF	18	(Brazil) Paulinho	(Saudi Arabia) Al-Shabab	End of loan	
1 July 2023	GK	1	(Saudi Arabia) Moslem Al Freej	(Saudi Arabia) Al-Safa	Free	
1 July 2023	DF	3	(Saudi Arabia) Bander Nasser	(Saudi Arabia) Al-Khaleej	Free	
15 July 2023	MF	16	(Saudi Arabia) Ali Al-Nemer	(Saudi Arabia) Ohod	Free	
2 August 2023	DF	17	(Saudi Arabia) Abdullah Al-Shamekh	(Saudi Arabia) Al-Qadsiah	Free	
7 August 2023	MF	26	(Saudi Arabia) Ali Al-Zaqaan	(Saudi Arabia) Al-Riyadh	Free	
7 September 2023	MF	66	(Saudi Arabia) Mohammed Abousaban	(Saudi Arabia) Al-Hazem	Free	
15 September 2023	MF	7	(North Macedonia) Aleksandar Trajkovski	(Croatia) Hajduk Split	Free	
30 January 2024	GK	28	(Saudi Arabia) Ahmed Al-Kassar	(Saudi Arabia) Al-Qadsiah	$3,200,000	
14 February 2024	MF	10	(Spain) Víctor Ruiz	(Switzerland) St. Gallen	Free	
16 February 2024	FW	23	(Serbia) Milan Pavkov	(Serbia) Čukarički	Free	

=== Loans out ===
Start date	End date	Position	No.	Player	To club	Fee	Ref.
12 August 2023	End of season	DF	14	(Saudi Arabia) Sultan Al-Harbi	(Saudi Arabia) Al-Qaisumah	None	
30 August 2023	End of season	DF	5	(Saudi Arabia) Naif Almas	(Saudi Arabia) Al-Orobah	None	
7 September 2023	End of season	DF	21	(Saudi Arabia) Muteb Al-Khaldi	(Saudi Arabia) Al-Taraji	None	

== Pre-season ==
13 July 2023 Friendly	Al-Fayha (Saudi Arabia)	3–2	(Serbia) NK Fužinar	Slovenske Konjice, Slovenia
17:30 CEST	Pavkov 4', 24'; Majrashi 34'	Report		Stadium: Stadion Dobrava

17 July 2023 Friendly	Al-Fayha (Saudi Arabia)	0–0	(Hungary) Szeged-Csanád	Rogla, Slovenia
16:30 CEST		Report		Stadium: RecoSport Training Camp

21 July 2023 Friendly	Al-Fayha (Saudi Arabia)	2–3	(Hungary) Paksi	Slovenske Konjice, Slovenia
17:00 CEST	Pavkov 18'; Nwakaeme 90+1' (pen.)	Report	Könyves 44'; Beke 74'; Böde 80'	Stadium: Stadion Dobrava

25 July 2023 Friendly	Al-Fayha (Saudi Arabia)	3–1	(Qatar) Al-Rayyan	Unterschützen, Austria
15:30 CEST	Nwakaeme 50'; Ryller 56'; Majrashi 77'	Report	Rodrigo 90+1'	Stadium: Sportanlage Unterschützen

5 August 2023 Friendly	Al-Fayha (Saudi Arabia)	0–0	(Saudi Arabia) Al-Taawoun	Buraidah, Saudi Arabia
19:00 AST		Report		Stadium: Al-Taawoun Club Stadium

== Competitions ==
=== Overview ===
Competition	Record							
Competition	G	W	D	L	GF	GA	GD	Win %
Pro League	34	11	11	12	44	52	−8	32.35
King's Cup	2	1	0	1	2	4	−2	50.00
Champions League	8	3	0	5	12	13	−1	37.50
Total	44	15	11	18	58	69	−11	34.09

Updated to match played 27 May 2024
Source: Competitions

=== Pro League ===
==== League table ====
Pos	Team	Pld	W	D	L	GF	GA	GD	Pts
7	Al-Fateh	34	12	9	13	57	55	+2	45
8	Al-Shabab	34	12	8	14	45	42	+3	44 (Note: Al-Shabab finished ahead of Al-Fayha on overall goal difference: Al-Shabab +3, Al-Fayha −8 (Al-Fayha 0–1 Al-Shabab, Al-Shabab 2–3 Al-Fayha).)
9	Al-Fayha	34	11	11	12	44	52	−8	44
10	Damac	34	10	11	13	44	45	−1	41
11	Al-Khaleej	34	9	10	15	36	47	−11	37 (Note: Al-Khaleej finished ahead of Al-Raed on head-to-head points: Al-Khaleej: 4 pts, Al-Raed: 1 pts (Al-Khaleej 0–0 Al-Raed, Al-Raed 0–1 Al-Khaleej).)

Source: SPL
Rules for classification: 1) Points; 2) Head-to-head points; 3) Head-to-head goal difference; 4) Total goal difference; 5) Total goals scored; 6) Fair-play points
(Note: Head-to-head record is used only after all the matches between the teams in question have been played).

==== Results summary ====
Overall								Home						Away					
Pld	W	D	L	GF	GA	GD	Pts	W	D	L	GF	GA	GD	W	D	L	GF	GA	GD
34	11	11	12	44	52	−8	44	4	7	6	18	23	−5	7	4	6	26	29	−3

Last updated: 27 May 2024.
Source: spl.com.sa

==== Results by round ====
Round	1	2	3	4	5	6	7	8	9	10	11	12	13	14	15	16	17	18	19	20	21	22	23	24	25	26	27	28	29	30	31	32	33	34
Ground	H	A	H	A	H	H	A	H	A	A	H	A	H	A	H	A	H	A	H	A	H	A	A	H	A	H	H	A	H	A	H	A	H	A
Result	W	D	D	L	D	L	W	D	D	W	L	D	D	W	L	L	L	L	L	W	W	W	W	D	L	L	W	L	W	W	D	D	D	L
Position	3	6	7	9	8	10	9	9	9	8	8	9	8	8	9	10	11	11	14	13	10	9	9	8	9	10	9	11	10	9	8	7	8	9

Updated to match(es) played on 27 May 2024. Source: spl.com.sa
A = Away; H = Home; W = Win; D = Draw; L = Loss

==== Matches ====
All times are local, AST (UTC+3).

Win Draw Loss Postponed

12 August 2023 1	Al-Fayha	3–1	Al-Khaleej	Al Majma'ah
21:00	Ryller 13'; Al-Safri (yellow card) 23'; Cimirot (yellow card) 29'; Sakala 45+7'; Ruiz (yellow card) 49'; Mandash 76' (pen.)	Report	Al-Samiri (yellow card) 15'; Al Dubais 87'	Stadium: Al Majma'ah Sports City; Attendance: 1,518; Referee: Faisal Al-Blwi

19 August 2023 2	Al-Hilal	1–1	Al-Fayha	Riyadh
21:00	Al-Hamdan 20'; Neves (yellow card) 55'; Radif (yellow card) 84'	Report	Sakala 15'; Stojković (yellow card) 65'; Cimirot (yellow card) 68'	Stadium: King Fahd International Stadium; Attendance: 59,600; Referee: Yael Falcón Pérez (Argentina)

25 August 2023 3	Al-Fayha	0–0	Al-Hazem	Al Majma'ah
18:00	Majrashi (yellow card) 65'	Report	Al-Sayyali (yellow card) 39'; Al-Dakheel (yellow card) 42'	Stadium: Al Majma'ah Sports City; Attendance: 465; Referee: Sultan Al-Okairy

28 August 2023 4	Abha	2–1	Al-Fayha	Abha
18:00	Toko Ekambi 36'; Al-Habib (yellow card) 45+7'; Abdu 63'; Al-Qumayzi (yellow card) 86'	Report	Al-Rashidi (yellow card) 61'; Sakala 87' (pen.)	Stadium: Prince Sultan bin Abdul Aziz Stadium; Attendance: 856; Referee: Abdulsamad Bakri

1 September 2023 5	Al-Fayha	0–0	Al-Raed	Al Majma'ah
18:00	Al-Rashidi (yellow card) 38'	Report	Al-Beshe (yellow card) 24'; Wohaishi (yellow card) 69'; Sayoud (yellow card) 90+5'	Stadium: Al Majma'ah Sports City; Attendance: 1,134; Referee: Shukri Al-Hanfoush

15 September 2023 6	Al-Fayha	0–1	Al-Shabab	Al Majma'ah
18:00	Cimirot (yellow card) 34'; Al-Baqawi (yellow card) 45+2'; Mandash (yellow card) 61'	Report	Diallo (yellow card) 45+2'; Saïss 52'; Al-Sharari (red card) 74'; Banega (yellow card) 90+2'	Stadium: Al Majma'ah Sports City; Attendance: 1,104; Referee: Ahmed Al-Rumaikhani

22 September 2023 7	Al-Riyadh	1–3	Al-Fayha	Riyadh
18:00	Al Abbas 80'; Al-Rashidi (yellow card) 90'	Report	Nwakaeme 17'; Sakala 63'; Sabiri 90+7'	Stadium: Prince Faisal bin Fahd Stadium; Attendance: 281; Referee: Abdulrahman Al-Sultan

29 September 2023 8	Al-Fayha	0–0	Al-Ittihad	Riyadh
18:00	Al-Baqawi (yellow card) 70'	Report	Hamdallah (yellow card) 79'; Kadesh (yellow card) 86'	Stadium: King Fahd International Stadium; Attendance: 10,081; Referee: Bastian Dankert (Germany)

7 October 2023 9	Al-Wehda	1–1	Al-Fayha	Mecca
21:00	Al-Hejji (yellow card) 59'; Duarte (yellow card) 73'; El Yamiq 76'	Report	Onyekuru 23'; Ryller (yellow card) 48'; Stojković (yellow card) 90+3'; Sabiri (yellow card) 90+7'	Stadium: King Abdul Aziz Stadium; Attendance: 937; Referee: Abdullah Al-Harbi

20 October 2023 10	Al-Okhdood	1–2	Al-Fayha	Najran
18:00	Godwin 45+4'	Report	Onyekuru 29'; Sakala 66'	Stadium: Prince Hathloul bin Abdul Aziz Sports City; Attendance: 792; Referee: Abdulrahman Al-Sultan

28 October 2023 11	Al-Fayha	1–3	Al-Nassr	Riyadh
18:00	Ryller (yellow card) 20'; Al-Shuwaish 66'; Al-Safri (yellow card) 89'	Report	Talisca 50', 61'; Al-Amri (yellow card) 53'; Otávio 74'	Stadium: King Fahd International Stadium; Attendance: 5,400; Referee: Anastasios Sidiropoulos (Greece)

3 November 2023 12	Al-Tai	3–3	Al-Fayha	Ha'il
18:00	Roco 21'; Al-Shamlan 24'; Mensah 29'; Al-Nakhli (yellow card) 45'	Report	Nwakaeme 15'; Ryller (yellow card) 40'; Sakala (yellow card) 50', (goal) 70'; Onyekuru 67'; Al-Safri (yellow card) 87'; Al-Enezi (yellow card) 90+1'	Stadium: Prince Abdul Aziz bin Musa'ed Stadium; Attendance: 4,331; Referee: Faisal Al-Blwi

11 November 2023 13	Al-Fayha	0–0	Al-Ettifaq	Al Majma'ah
18:00	Al-Khalaf (yellow card) 56'	Report	Hazazi (yellow card) 88'; Tisserand (yellow card) 90+3'	Stadium: Al Majma'ah Sports City; Attendance: 610; Referee: Shukri Al-Hanfoush

25 November 2023 14	Al-Fateh	0–1	Al-Fayha	Al-Hasa
21:00	Bendebka (yellow card) 30'; Baattia (yellow card) 45+2'	Report	Nwakaeme 39'; Stojković (yellow card) 88'; Haqawi (yellow card) 90+1'	Stadium: Al-Fateh Club Stadium; Attendance: 10,815; Referee: Fareeh Al-Jaloud

1 December 2023 15	Al-Fayha	2–4	Damac	Al Majma'ah
18:00	Sakala (yellow card) 32'; Zidan (yellow card) 45+2'; Onyekuru 56', 69'	Report	Nkoudou 16' (pen.), 65'; Al-Shahrani 36'; Hamed (yellow card) 84'; Al-Mahasneh (yellow card) 90+4'; Ceesay 90+6'	Stadium: Al Majma'ah Sports City; Attendance: 528; Referee: Mohammed Al-Hoaish

8 December 2023 16	Al-Taawoun	4–1	Al-Fayha	Buraidah
18:00	Castro 15'; El Mahdioui 40' (pen.); Barrow 62'; Adam 84'	Report	Sakala 6'	Stadium: Al-Taawoun Club Stadium; Attendance: 3,170; Referee: Sami Al-Jires

14 December 2023 17	Al-Fayha	0–4	Al-Ahli	Riyadh
21:00	Al-Safri (yellow card) 65'; Sakala (yellow card) 87'	Report	Al-Buraikan 11', 30'; Majrashi 17'; Mahrez 43' (pen.)	Stadium: Prince Faisal bin Fahd Stadium; Attendance: 5,932; Referee: Guillermo Enrique Guerrero (Ecuador)

21 December 2023 18	Al-Khaleej	3–0	Al-Fayha	Dammam
18:00	Jung Woo-young 21'; López (yellow card) 25'; Narey 32' (pen.); Al-Khaibari 82' (o.g.)	Report	Al-Rashidi (yellow card) 31'; Al-Qaydhi (yellow card) 42'; Al-Baqawi (yellow card) 55'; Al-Khaibari (yellow card) 55'	Stadium: Prince Mohamed bin Fahd Stadium; Attendance: 5,221; Referee: Faisal Al-Blwi

29 December 2023 19	Al-Fayha	0–2	Al-Hilal	Riyadh
18:00	Al-Harthi (yellow card) 62'; Zidan (yellow card) 87'; Al-Safri (yellow card) 90+11'; Al-Khaibari (yellow card) 90+11'; Al-Shuwaish (yellow card) 90+11'	Report	Al-Bulaihi 86', (yellow card) 87'; Mitrović 90+11' (pen.)	Stadium: Prince Faisal bin Fahd Stadium; Attendance: 7,789; Referee: Mario Escobar (Guatemala)

17 February 2024 20	Al-Hazem	1–3	Al-Fayha	Ar Rass
17:00	Al-Thani 9'; Selemani (yellow card) 50'; Tozé (yellow card) 55'	Report	Onyekuru 13', 82'; Cimirot (yellow card) 29'; Al-Safri (yellow card) 45+2'; Nwakaeme 59'	Stadium: Al-Hazem Club Stadium; Attendance: 355; Referee: Majed Al-Shamrani

25 February 2024 21	Al-Fayha	3–2	Abha	Al Majma'ah
17:00	Al-Shuwaish (red card) 4'; Sabiri 45+1', (yellow card) 90+7'; Sakala 70', 89'	Report	Krychowiak (yellow card) 21', (goal) 29' (pen.); Matić (yellow card) 45+2'; Al-Zubaidi (yellow card) 82'; Abdu 90+6'	Stadium: Al Majma'ah Sports City; Attendance: 840; Referee: Abdullah Al-Harbi

29 February 2024 22	Al-Raed	1–2	Al-Fayha	Buraidah
17:00	Tavares 55'; Al-Rajeh (yellow card) 61'; Normann (red card) 62'	Report	Al-Harthi 50'; Konan (yellow card) 66'; Sakala 76'; R. Kaabi (yellow card) 79'	Stadium: Al-Raed Club Stadium; Attendance: 4,746; Referee: Raed Al-Zahrani

7 March 2024 23	Al-Shabab	2–3	Al-Fayha	Riyadh
17:00	Vitinho (yellow card) 45+1'; Al-Duqayl 86' (o.g.); Diallo 89'; Al-Muwallad (yellow card) 90+2'	Report	Onyekuru 50' (pen.), 74'; Al-Qaydhi (yellow card) 59'; Al-Safri (yellow card) 88'; Al-Duqayl (yellow card) 90+2'; Zidan 90+8'	Stadium: Al-Shabab Club Stadium; Attendance: 2,012; Referee: Gustavo Correia (Portugal)

15 March 2024 24	Al-Fayha	1–1	Al-Riyadh	Al Majma'ah
22:00	Onyekuru 30'; Sakala (yellow card) 90+1'	Report	Gray (yellow card) 35'; Al-Shuwayyi (yellow card) 45+1'; Musona 64'; Al-Khaibari (yellow card) 75'	Stadium: Al Majma'ah Sports City; Attendance: 811; Referee: Ahmed Al-Rumaikhani

29 March 2024 25	Al-Ittihad	3–1	Al-Fayha	Jeddah
22:00	Hamdallah 30'; A. Al-Ghamdi 45+2', (yellow card) 74'; Al-Sahafi 90+4'	Report	Sabiri 25' (pen.); Al-Khaibari (yellow card) 45+6'	Stadium: Prince Abdullah Al Faisal Stadium; Attendance: 9,312; Referee: Radu Petrescu (Romania)

2 April 2024 26	Al-Fayha	1–2	Al-Wehda	Al Majma'ah
22:00	Sakala 53'; Kaabi (yellow card) 58'; Cimirot (yellow card) 81'; Al-Rashidi (yellow card) 83'; Zidan (yellow card) 90+10'	Report	Noor (yellow card) 31'; Duarte 47'; Anselmo 56', (yellow card) 90'	Stadium: Al Majma'ah Sports City; Attendance: 379; Referee: Mohammed Al-Beredi

7 April 2024 27	Al-Fayha	3–0	Al-Okhdood	Al Majma'ah
22:00	Sakala 16', 55'; Al-Baqawi (yellow card) 45+1'; Sabiri 88'	Report	Al-Rubaie (yellow card) 22'	Stadium: Al Majma'ah Sports City; Attendance: 294; Referee: Abdullah Al-Harbi

19 April 2024 28	Al-Nassr	3–1	Al-Fayha	Riyadh
18:00	Mané (yellow card) 37', (goal) 76', 82'; Al-Amri 72'; Al-Khaibari (yellow card) 88'	Report	Sakala 6', (red card) 88'; Cimirot (yellow card) 28'; Sabiri (yellow card) 45+3'	Stadium: Al-Awwal Park; Attendance: 6,093; Referee: Mohammed Al-Harbi

25 April 2024 29	Al-Fayha	1–0	Al-Tai	Al Majma'ah
18:00	Al-Khaibari (yellow card) 8'; R. Kaabi (yellow card) 38'; Sabiri (yellow card) 45+4'; Mandash 47'	Report	Al-Shamlan (yellow card) 22'; Al-Nakhli (yellow card) 34'; Al-Johani (yellow card) 54'	Stadium: Al Majma'ah Sports City; Attendance: 572; Referee: Abdulsamad Bakri

3 May 2024 30	Al-Ettifaq	1–2	Al-Fayha	Dammam
21:00	Fofana (yellow card) 6'; Al-Otaibi (yellow card) 58'; Al-Shamrani (yellow card) 68'; Dembélé 81'	Report	Al-Safri (yellow card) 57'; Sakala 72', 85'	Stadium: Al-Ettifaq Club Stadium; Attendance: 4,576; Referee: Fareeh Al-Jaloud

9 May 2024 31	Al-Fayha	2–2	Al-Fateh	Al Majma'ah
18:00	Sakala 29', (yellow card) 85'; Al-Khalaf (yellow card) 37'; Sabiri 69'	Report	Lajami (yellow card) 40'; Djaniny 47'; Bendebka 76'	Stadium: Al Majma'ah Sports City; Attendance: 445; Referee: Mohammed Abu Shaqarah

17 May 2024 32	Damac	1–1	Al-Fayha	Khamis Mushait
19:15	Al-Rashidi (yellow card) 24'; S. Hawsawi (yellow card) 35'; Makin (yellow card) 62'; Solan 79', (yellow card) 80'	Report	Sakala 42' (pen.); Stojković (yellow card) 71'	Stadium: Damac Club Stadium; Attendance: 462; Referee: Abdullah Al-Harbi

23 May 2024 33	Al-Fayha	1–1	Al-Taawoun	Al Majma'ah
21:00	Sakala 12'; Cimirot (yellow card) 27'; Ryller (yellow card) 44'; Al-Baqawi (red card) 90+10'; Sabiri (yellow card) 90+10'	Report	Al-Oyayari 9'; Al-Saluli (yellow card) 62'; Flávio (yellow card) 90+6'	Stadium: Al Majma'ah Sports City; Attendance: 1,214; Referee: Abdullah Al-Kharboush

27 May 2024 34	Al-Ahli	1–0	Al-Fayha	Jeddah
21:00	Firmino 85'; Al-Nabit (yellow card) 90+2'; Kessié (yellow card) 90+2'	Report	Haqawi (yellow card) 15'; Al-Enezi (yellow card) 81'	Stadium: Prince Abdullah Al Faisal Stadium; Attendance: 8,489; Referee: Radu Petrescu

=== King's Cup ===
All times are local, AST (UTC+3).

26 September 2023 Round of 32	Al-Riyadh	1–2	Al-Fayha	Riyadh
18:00	Ndong 16'; Kurdi (yellow card) 42'; Gray (yellow card) 90+11'	Report	Al-Abdulmenem 19', 45+3'; R. Kaabi (yellow card) 44'; Sabiri (yellow card) 84'; Al-Rashidi (yellow card) 90+11'	Stadium: Prince Faisal bin Fahd Stadium; Attendance: 61; Referee: Mohammed Al-Harbi

31 October 2023 Round of 16	Al-Fayha	0–3	Al-Ittihad	Riyadh
17:45	Ryller (yellow card) 41'; Al-Baqawi (yellow card) 47'; Al-Rashidi (yellow card) 78'; Al-Shuwaish (yellow card) 87'	Report	Hamdallah 5', 87'; Kanté (yellow card) 81'; Benzema 90+4'	Stadium: King Fahd International Stadium; Attendance: 3,942; Referee: Tamás Bognár (Hungary)

=== Champions League ===
==== Group stage ====
Pos	Team	Pld	W	D	L	GF	GA	GD	Pts	Qualification	AIN	FEI	PAK	AHA
1	(United Arab Emirates) Al-Ain	6	5	0	1	17	9	+8	15	Advance to round of 16	—	4–1	1–3	4–2
2	(Saudi Arabia) Al-Fayha	6	3	0	3	12	10	+2	9	Advance to round of 16	2–3	—	2–0	3–1
3	(Uzbekistan) Pakhtakor	6	2	1	3	8	11	−3	7		0–3	1–4	—	3–0
4	(Turkmenistan) Ahal	6	1	1	4	6	13	−7	4		1–2	1–0	1–1	—

Source: AFC
Rules for classification: Tiebreakers

19 September 2023 1	Ahal (Turkmenistan)	1–0	(Saudi Arabia) Al-Fayha	Ashgabat, Turkmenistan
21:00 UTC+5	Tagayew 51', (yellow card) 52'; Meredov (yellow card) 90+5'	Report	Al-Rashidi (yellow card) 40'	Stadium: Ashgabat Stadium; Attendance: 19,966; Referee: Adham Makhadmeh (Jordan)

3 October 2023 2	Al-Fayha (Saudi Arabia)	2–0	(Uzbekistan) Pakhtakor	Riyadh, Saudi Arabia
19:00 UTC+3	Sabiri 10', 71', (yellow card) 79'; Al-Rashidi (yellow card) 18'; Al-Kassar (yellow card) 77'; Kaabi (yellow card) 83'	Report	Kholmatov (yellow card) 5'; Sayfiev (yellow card) 56'; K. Alijonov (yellow card) 68'; Hamrobekov (yellow card) 90+5'	Stadium: Prince Faisal bin Fahd Stadium; Attendance: 1,088; Referee: Mohanad Qasim Sarray (Iraq)

24 October 2023 3	Al-Ain (United Arab Emirates)	4–1	(Saudi Arabia) Al-Fayha	Al Ain, United Arab Emirates
20:00 UTC+4	Autonne 36'; Kaku 45+3', 67'; Al-Ahbabi (yellow card) 83'; Rahimi (yellow card) 85', (goal) 90'	Report	Al-Baqawi (yellow card) 11'; Onyekuru (yellow card) 68'; Al-Harthi 84'; Al-Rashidi (yellow card) 90+2'; Al-Qaydhi (yellow card) 90+8'	Stadium: Hazza bin Zayed Stadium; Attendance: 7,126; Referee: Hanna Hattab (Syria)

7 November 2023 4	Al-Fayha (Saudi Arabia)	2–3	(United Arab Emirates) Al-Ain	Riyadh, Saudi Arabia
19:00 UTC+3	Nwakaeme 53'; Al-Qaydhi (yellow card) 61', (goal) 90+6'; Zidan (yellow card) 71'	Report	Laba 29', 40'; Al-Hashemi (yellow card) 39'; Rahimi 64'	Stadium: King Fahd International Stadium; Attendance: 1,002; Referee: Ma Ning (China)

28 November 2023 5	Al-Fayha (Saudi Arabia)	3–1	(Turkmenistan) Ahal	Riyadh, Saudi Arabia
19:00 UTC+3	Nwakaeme 19' (pen.); Sakala 45+6'; Al-Qaydhi (yellow card) 57'; Mandash 75'	Report	Tagaýew 36' (pen.); Abdyrahmanow (yellow card) 90+6'	Stadium: Prince Faisal bin Fahd Stadium; Attendance: 133; Referee: Ahmad Al Ali (Kuwait)

5 December 2023 6	Pakhtakor (Uzbekistan)	1–4	(Saudi Arabia) Al-Fayha	Tashkent, Uzbekistan
19:00 UTC+5	Erkinov 16'; Ćeran (yellow card) 62'	Report	Sakala (yellow card) 23', (goal) 40', 90+4'; Mandash 46'; Al-Enezi (yellow card) 58'; Onyekuru 85'; Kaabi (yellow card) 90'	Stadium: Bunyodkor Stadium; Attendance: 2,150; Referee: Ahmed Al-Kaf (Oman)

==== Knockout stage ====
===== Round of 16 =====
14 February 2024 First leg	Al-Fayha (Saudi Arabia)	0–1	(Saudi Arabia) Al-Nassr	Riyadh, Saudi Arabia
21:00 UTC+3	Al-Shuwaish (yellow card) 77'; Sabiri (yellow card) 82'	Report	Al-Khaibari (yellow card) 37'; Ronaldo 81'; Al-Najjar (yellow card) 85'	Stadium: Prince Faisal bin Fahd Stadium; Attendance: 3,111; Referee: Salman Ahmad Falahi (Qatar)

21 February 2024 Second leg	Al-Nassr (Saudi Arabia)	2–0 (3–0 agg.)	(Saudi Arabia) Al-Fayha	Riyadh, Saudi Arabia
21:00 UTC+3	Otávio 17', (yellow card) 19'; Ronaldo (yellow card) 45+1', (goal) 86'; Al-Khaibari (yellow card) 79'	Report	Al-Safri (yellow card) 15'; Al-Harthi (yellow card) 36'; Onyekuru (yellow card) 45+4'; Al-Baqawi (yellow card) 54'; Al-Khalaf (yellow card) 58'	Stadium: Al-Awwal Park; Attendance: 22,783; Referee: Ma Ning (China)

== Statistics ==
=== Appearances ===
Last updated on 27 May 2024.

No.	Pos	Nat	Player	Total		Pro League		King's Cup		Champions League	
No.	Pos	Nat	Player	Apps	Goals	Apps	Goals	Apps	Goals	Apps	Goals
Goalkeepers
1	GK	(Saudi Arabia) KSA	Abdulraouf Al-Duqayl	6	0	4+2	0	0	0	0	0
34	GK	(Saudi Arabia) KSA	Osama Al-Thumairy	0	0	0	0	0	0	0	0
88	GK	(Serbia) SRB	Vladimir Stojković	35	0	30	0	1	0	4	0
96	GK	(Saudi Arabia) KSA	Abdulaziz Al-Murdhi	0	0	0	0	0	0	0	0
Defenders
2	DF	(Saudi Arabia) KSA	Mukhair Al-Rashidi	36	0	25+3	0	1+1	0	6	0
3	DF	(Ivory Coast) CIV	Ghislain Konan	31	0	25+1	0	1	0	4	0
4	DF	(Saudi Arabia) KSA	Sami Al-Khaibari	23	0	20	0	0	0	3	0
12	DF	(Saudi Arabia) KSA	Yousef Haqawi	10	0	1+5	0	1	0	2+1	0
22	DF	(Saudi Arabia) KSA	Mohammed Al-Baqawi	39	0	29+2	0	1	0	7	0
33	DF	(Saudi Arabia) KSA	Hussein Al-Shuwaish	37	1	26+4	1	1	0	5+1	0
40	DF	(Saudi Arabia) KSA	Mohammed Al-Dowaish	0	0	0	0	0	0	0	0
62	DF	(Saudi Arabia) KSA	Hossam Majrashi	2	0	0+1	0	0	0	0+1	0
75	DF	(Saudi Arabia) KSA	Khalid Al-Rammah	3	0	0	0	0	0	0+3	0
80	DF	(Saudi Arabia) KSA	Osama Al-Khalaf	26	0	7+11	0	1	0	4+3	0
98	DF	(Saudi Arabia) KSA	Muhannad Al-Qaydhi	27	1	12+8	0	1	0	3+3	1
Midfielders
6	MF	(Saudi Arabia) KSA	Saud Zidan	30	1	10+14	1	0+1	0	1+4	0
8	MF	(Saudi Arabia) KSA	Abdulrahman Al-Safri	38	0	20+9	0	2	0	6+1	0
11	MF	(Saudi Arabia) KSA	Khalid Kaabi	8	0	0+5	0	0	0	0+3	0
13	MF	(Bosnia and Herzegovina) BIH	Gojko Cimirot	33	0	26+3	0	1	0	3	0
27	MF	(Saudi Arabia) KSA	Sultan Mandash	41	4	17+15	2	1+1	0	6+1	2
29	MF	(Saudi Arabia) KSA	Nawaf Al-Harthi	33	2	12+13	1	1+1	0	3+3	1
37	MF	(Brazil) BRA	Ricardo Ryller	20	1	11+4	1	1+1	0	3	0
66	MF	(Saudi Arabia) KSA	Rakan Kaabi	24	0	5+11	0	1+1	0	3+3	0
70	MF	(Saudi Arabia) KSA	Abdulrahman Al-Enezi	8	0	0+5	0	1	0	1+1	0
77	MF	(Morocco) MAR	Abdelhamid Sabiri	23	7	17+2	5	0+1	0	2+1	2
Forwards
7	FW	(Nigeria) NGR	Henry Onyekuru	34	11	26+1	10	1	0	3+3	1
9	FW	(Nigeria) NGR	Anthony Nwakaeme	27	6	17+3	4	1+1	0	5	2
17	FW	(Zambia) ZAM	Fashion Sakala	41	22	30+1	19	1+1	0	8	3
19	FW	(Saudi Arabia) KSA	Mohammed Majrashi	9	0	0+6	0	1	0	1+1	0
45	FW	(Saudi Arabia) KSA	Sattam Al-Lehyani	4	0	1+3	0	0	0	0	0
49	FW	(Saudi Arabia) KSA	Ali Al Jubaya	5	0	0+2	0	0	0	0+3	0
99	FW	(Saudi Arabia) KSA	Malek Al-Abdulmenem	4	2	0+1	0	1+1	2	0+1	0
Player who made an appearance this season but have left the club
10	MF	(Spain) ESP	Víctor Ruiz	4	0	2+2	0	0	0	0	0
23	FW	(Serbia) SRB	Milan Pavkov	4	0	1+2	0	0	0	1	0
28	GK	(Saudi Arabia) KSA	Ahmed Al-Kassar	6	0	0+1	0	1	0	4	0

=== Goalscorers ===
Rank	No.	Pos	Nat	Name	Pro League	King's Cup	Champions League	Total
1	17	FW	(Zambia)	Fashion Sakala	19	0	3	22
2	7	FW	(Nigeria)	Henry Onyekuru	10	0	1	11
3	77	MF	(Morocco)	Abdelhamid Sabiri	5	0	2	7
4	9	FW	(Nigeria)	Anthony Nwakaeme	4	0	2	6
5	27	MF	(Saudi Arabia)	Sultan Mandash	2	0	2	4
6	29	MF	(Saudi Arabia)	Nawaf Al-Harthi	1	0	1	2
6	99	FW	(Saudi Arabia)	Malek Al-Abdulmenem	0	2	0	2
8	6	MF	(Saudi Arabia)	Saud Zidan	1	0	0	1
8	33	DF	(Saudi Arabia)	Hussein Al-Shuwaish	1	0	0	1
8	37	MF	(Brazil)	Ricardo Ryller	1	0	0	1
8	98	DF	(Saudi Arabia)	Muhannad Al-Qaydhi	0	0	1	1
Own goal					0	0	0	0
Total					44	2	12	58

Last Updated: 23 May 2024

=== Assists ===
Rank	No.	Pos	Nat	Name	Pro League	King's Cup	Champions League	Total
1	17	FW	(Zambia)	Fashion Sakala	6	0	2	8
2	77	MF	(Morocco)	Abdelhamid Sabiri	7	0	0	7
3	27	MF	(Saudi Arabia)	Sultan Mandash	3	1	2	6
4	3	DF	(Ivory Coast)	Ghislain Konan	5	0	0	5
4	9	FW	(Nigeria)	Anthony Nwakaeme	5	0	0	5
4	13	MF	(Bosnia and Herzegovina)	Gojko Cimirot	5	0	0	5
7	7	FW	(Nigeria)	Henry Onyekuru	3	0	0	3
7	80	DF	(Saudi Arabia)	Osama Al-Khalaf	1	0	2	3
9	8	MF	(Saudi Arabia)	Abdulrahman Al-Safri	1	0	0	1
9	29	MF	(Saudi Arabia)	Nawaf Al-Harthi	0	1	0	1
9	37	MF	(Brazil)	Ricardo Ryller	0	0	1	1
9	49	FW	(Saudi Arabia)	Ali Al Jubaya	0	0	1	1
9	66	MF	(Saudi Arabia)	Rakan Kaabi	0	0	1	1
Total					36	2	9	47

Last Updated: 23 May 2024

=== Clean sheets ===
Rank	No.	Pos	Nat	Name	Pro League	King's Cup	Champions League	Total
1	88	GK	(Serbia)	Vladimir Stojković	6	0	0	6
2	1	GK	(Saudi Arabia)	Abdulraouf Al-Duqayl	1	0	0	1
2	28	GK	(Saudi Arabia)	Ahmed Al-Kassar	0	0	1	1
Total					7	0	1	8

Last Updated: 25 April 2024
