= 2022–23 Al-Fayha FC season =

Al-Fayha
2022–23 season
- President: Abdullah Abanmy
- Manager: Vuk Rašović
- Stadium: Al Majma'ah Sports City
- SPL: 11th
- King Cup: Quarter-finals (knocked out by Al-Ittihad)
- Super Cup: Runners-up (knocked out by Al-Ittihad)
- Top goalscorer: League: Anthony Nwakaeme (9); All: Anthony Nwakaeme (9)
- Highest home attendance: 6,291 v Damac; 25 August 2022; Saudi Pro League
- Lowest home attendance: 2,068 v Al-Wehda; 4 February 2023; Saudi Pro League
- Average home league attendance: 3,860
- Biggest win: 3–1 v Al-Khaleej; 20 December 2022; King Cup; 2–0 v Al-Fateh; 30 December 2022; Saudi Pro League; 4–2 v Al-Raed; 14 January 2023; Saudi Pro League; 2–0 v Al-Wehda; 4 February 2023; Saudi Pro League; 2–0 v Abha; 2 March 2023; Saudi Pro League
- Biggest defeat: 0–4 v Al-Nassr; 16 October 2022; Saudi Pro League
Home colours	Away colours	Third colours

The 2022–23 season was Al-Fayha's 69th year in their existence and their fifth non-consecutive season in the Pro League. The club participated in the Pro League, the King Cup, and the Super Cup.

The season covered the period from 1 July 2022 to 30 June 2023.

== Players ==
=== Squad information ===
As of 1 September 2022

Note: Flags indicate national team as defined under FIFA eligibility rules; some limited exceptions apply. Players may hold more than one non-FIFA nationality.

No.	Pos.	Nation	Player
1	GK	KSA	Moslem Al Freej
2	DF	KSA	Mukhair Al-Rashidi
3	DF	KSA	Bander Nasser
4	DF	KSA	Sami Al-Khaibari (captain)
5	DF	KSA	Naif Almas
6	MF	KSA	Saud Zidan
7	MF	MKD	Aleksandar Trajkovski
8	MF	KSA	Abdulrahman Al-Safri
9	FW	NGR	Anthony Nwakaeme
10	MF	ESP	Víctor Ruiz
11	MF	KSA	Khalid Kaabi
16	MF	KSA	Ali Al-Nemer
17	DF	KSA	Abdullah Al-Shamekh
18	MF	BRA	Paulinho (on loan from Al-Shabab)
19	FW	KSA	Mohammed Majrashi

No.	Pos.	Nation	Player
22	DF	KSA	Mohammed Al-Baqawi
23	FW	SRB	Milan Pavkov
26	MF	KSA	Ali Al-Zaqaan
27	MF	KSA	Sultan Mandash
33	DF	KSA	Hussein Al-Shuwaish
37	MF	BRA	Ricardo Ryller
55	GK	KSA	Faisel Masrahi
64	DF	KSA	Sultan Al-Harbi
66	MF	KSA	Mohammed Abousaban
77	MF	GRE	Panagiotis Tachtsidis
80	DF	KSA	Osama Al-Khalaf
88	GK	SRB	Vladimir Stojković
90	GK	KSA	Rashed Al-Mowainea
98	DF	KSA	Muhannad Al-Qaydhi
99	FW	KSA	Malek Al-Abdulmenem

== Transfers and loans ==
=== Transfers in ===
Entry date	Position	No.	Player	From club	Fee	Ref.
30 June 2022	DF	36	(Saudi Arabia) Hazaa Asiri	(Saudi Arabia) Jeddah	End of loan	
30 June 2022	DF	64	(Saudi Arabia) Sultan Al-Harbi	(Saudi Arabia) Bisha	End of loan	
30 June 2022	MF	–	(Saudi Arabia) Naif Ahmed	(Saudi Arabia) Al-Zulfi	End of loan	
30 June 2022	MF	15	(Saudi Arabia) Ibrahim Al-Harbi	(Saudi Arabia) Al-Jabalain	End of loan	
1 July 2022	GK	55	(Saudi Arabia) Faisel Masrahi	(Saudi Arabia) Al-Qadsiah	Free	
3 July 2022	MF	6	(Saudi Arabia) Saud Zidan	(Saudi Arabia) Al-Hazem	Undisclosed	
12 July 2022	MF	11	(Saudi Arabia) Khalid Kaabi	(Saudi Arabia) Al-Faisaly	Free	
13 July 2022	FW	19	(Saudi Arabia) Mohammed Majrashi	(Saudi Arabia) Al-Ahli	Free	
19 July 2022	DF	17	(Saudi Arabia) Abdullah Al-Shamekh	(Saudi Arabia) Al-Shabab	Free	
20 July 2022	DF	80	(Saudi Arabia) Osama Al-Khalaf	(Saudi Arabia) Al-Nassr	$266,000	
2 August 2022	DF	98	(Saudi Arabia) Muhannad Al-Qaydhi	(Saudi Arabia) Abha	Free	
2 August 2022	MF	10	(Spain) Víctor Ruiz	(Switzerland) St. Gallen	Undisclosed	
26 August 2022	MF	9	(Nigeria) Anthony Nwakaeme	(Turkey) Trabzonspor	Free	
28 August 2022	FW	23	(Serbia) Milan Pavkov	(Serbia) Red Star Belgrade	$1,000,000	

=== Loans in ===
Start date	End date	Position	No.	Player	From club	Fee	Ref.
30 July 2022	End of season	MF	18	(Brazil) Paulinho	(Saudi Arabia) Al-Shabab	None	

=== Transfers out ===
Exit date	Position	No.	Player	To club	Fee	Ref.
30 June 2022	GK	23	(Saudi Arabia) Marwan Al-Haidari	(Saudi Arabia) Al-Shabab	End of loan	
30 June 2022	MF	6	(Saudi Arabia) Yousef Al-Harbi	(Saudi Arabia) Al-Wehda	End of loan	
30 June 2022	MF	26	(Saudi Arabia) Fawaz Al-Torais	(Saudi Arabia) Al-Hilal	End of loan	
30 June 2022	MF	81	(Saudi Arabia) Ibrahim Al-Barakah	(Saudi Arabia) Al-Hazem	End of loan	
30 June 2022	FW	47	(Saudi Arabia) Rayan Al-Bloushi	(Saudi Arabia) Al-Ettifaq	End of loan	
20 July 2022	MF	19	(Ghana) Samuel Owusu	(Serbia) Čukarički	Free	
23 July 2022	MF	10	(Saudi Arabia) Abdullah Al-Dossari	(Saudi Arabia) Al-Arabi	Free	
24 July 2022	MF	15	(Saudi Arabia) Ibrahim Al-Harbi	(Saudi Arabia) Al-Arabi	Free	
21 August 2022	DF	36	(Saudi Arabia) Hazaa Asiri	(Saudi Arabia) Jeddah	Free	
25 August 2022	MF	–	(Saudi Arabia) Naif Ahmed	(Saudi Arabia) Al-Lewaa	Free	
29 August 2022	DF	24	(Saudi Arabia) Ahmed Bamsaud	(Saudi Arabia) Al-Ittihad	$1,600,000	
31 August 2022	MF	18	(Saudi Arabia) Abdulmalek Al-Shammeri	(Saudi Arabia) Al-Raed	Free	
31 August 2022	MF	20	(Niger) Amadou Moutari	(Saudi Arabia) Al-Qadsiah	Free	
15 September 2022	FW	7	(Brazil) Ramon Lopes	(United Arab Emirates) Khor Fakkan	Free	
30 September 2022	MF	77	(Greece) Panagiotis Tachtsidis	(United Arab Emirates) Khor Fakkan	Free	

== Pre-season ==
1 August 2022 Friendly	Al-Fayha (Saudi Arabia)	6–0	(Austria) SPG Silz/Mötz	Mötz, Austria
18:00 CEST	Abousaban 14'; Trajkovski 16', 26'; Tachtsidis 20' (pen.); Al-Zaqaan 64'; Al-Shamekh 73' (pen.)	Report		Stadium: Sportplatz Mötz

4 August 2022 Friendly	Al-Fayha (Saudi Arabia)	2–0	(United Arab Emirates) Al-Ain	Tyrol, Austria
18:00 CEST	Ruiz 24', 50'	Report

7 August 2022 Friendly	Al-Fayha (Saudi Arabia)	1–1	(Saudi Arabia) Abha	Austria
15:00 CEST	Paulinho 32'	Report	Bguir 90' (pen.)

== Competitions ==
=== Overview ===
Competition	Record							
Competition	G	W	D	L	GF	GA	GD	Win %
Pro League	30	8	9	13	31	43	−12	26.67
King Cup	2	1	1	0	4	2	+2	50.00
Super Cup	2	1	0	1	1	2	−1	50.00
Total	34	10	10	14	36	47	−11	29.41

Updated to match played 31 May 2023
Source: Competitions

=== Pro League ===
==== League table ====
Pos	Team	Pld	W	D	L	GF	GA	GD	Pts	Qualification or relegation
9	Al-Tai	30	10	4	16	41	49	−8	34 (Note: Al-Tai finished ahead of Al-Raed on head-to-head points: Al-Tai: 4 pts, Al-Raed: 1 pts (Al-Raed 0–2 Al-Tai, Al-Tai 2–2 Al-Raed).)	
10	Al-Raed	30	9	7	14	41	49	−8	34	
11	Al-Fayha (Note: Al-Fayha qualified for the AFC Champions League group stage as the 2021–22 King Cup winners.)	30	8	9	13	31	43	−12	33 (Note: Al-Fayha finished ahead of Abha on head-to-head points: Al-Fayha: 4 pts, Abha: 1 pts (Abha 1–1 Al-Fayha, Al-Fayha 2–0 Abha).)	Qualified for the AFC Champions League group stage
12	Abha	30	10	3	17	33	52	−19	33	
13	Al-Wehda	30	8	8	14	26	43	−17	32	

Updated to match(es) played on 31 May 2023. Source: SPL
Rules for classification: 1) Points; 2) Head-to-head points; 3) Head-to-head goal difference; 4) Total goal difference; 5) Total goals scored; 6) Fair-play points (Note: Head-to-head record is used only after all the matches between the teams in question have been played).

==== Results summary ====
Overall								Home						Away					
Pld	W	D	L	GF	GA	GD	Pts	W	D	L	GF	GA	GD	W	D	L	GF	GA	GD
30	8	9	13	31	43	−12	33	4	5	6	15	20	−5	4	4	7	16	23	−7

Last updated: 31 May 2023.
Source: spl.com.sa

==== Results by round ====
Round	1	2	3	4	5	6	7	8	9	10	11	12	13	14	15	16	17	18	19	20	21	22	23	24	25	26	27	28	29	30
Ground	H	A	H	A	H	A	H	A	A	H	A	H	A	A	H	A	H	A	H	A	H	A	H	H	A	H	A	H	H	A
Result	L	L	D	D	L	L	L	L	W	W	W	D	W	L	W	D	L	D	W	L	D	L	D	L	L	W	D	D	L	W
Position	11	14	13	13	14	15	15	15	13	13	12	13	12	13	11	11	12	11	8	11	10	10	11	12	12	12	12	12	13	11

Updated to match(es) played on 31 May 2023. Source: spl.com.sa
A = Away; H = Home; W = Win; D = Draw; L = Loss

==== Matches ====
All times are local, AST (UTC+3).

Win Draw Loss Postponed

25 August 2022 1	Al-Fayha	0–1	Damac	Al Majma'ah
19:05		Report	Chafaï (yellow card) 21'; Antolić 51'	Stadium: Al Majma'ah Sports City; Attendance: 6,291; Referee: Abdullah Al-Shehri

31 August 2022 2	Al-Hilal	2–0	Al-Fayha	Riyadh
21:00	Cuéllar (yellow card) 37'; Jahfali (yellow card) 48'; Marega 69'; Ighalo 86'	Report	Al-Khaibari (yellow card) 29'; Ryller (yellow card) 57'	Stadium: Prince Faisal bin Fahd Stadium; Attendance: 11,215; Referee: Sandro Schärer (Switzerland)

10 September 2022 3	Al-Fayha	1–1	Al-Taawoun	Al Majma'ah
18:45	Ryller (yellow card) 10'; Mandash 51'; Stojković (yellow card) 70'	Report	Kadesh 90+2'	Stadium: Al Majma'ah Sports City; Attendance: 3,184; Referee: Shukri Al-Hanfoush

16 September 2022 4	Abha	1–1	Al-Fayha	Abha
18:50	Al-Qayd (yellow card) 18'; Al-Amri 65', (yellow card) 90+6'	Report	Al-Khaibari (yellow card) 52'; Nwakaeme 87'	Stadium: Prince Sultan bin Abdul Aziz Stadium; Attendance: 917; Referee: Mohammed Al-Esmaiel

2 October 2022 5	Al-Fayha	1–2	Al-Shabab	Al Majma'ah
18:20	Nwakaeme 36' (pen.); Al-Safri (yellow card) 79'; Mandash (yellow card) 90+3'	Report	Al-Sqoor (yellow card) 35'; Krychowiak 55', 71'; Guanca (yellow card) 58'	Stadium: Al Majma'ah Sports City; Attendance: 4,028; Referee: Faisal Al-Blwi

7 October 2022 6	Al-Adalah	2–1	Al-Fayha	Al-Hasa
21:00	Al-Torais 2'; Gonzáles 65'; Hadhereti (yellow card) 83'; Al Haydar (yellow card) 85'	Report	Nwakaeme 54'; Paulinho (yellow card) 90+1'	Stadium: Prince Abdullah bin Jalawi Stadium; Attendance: 7,632; Referee: Mohammed Al-Beredi

11 October 2022 7	Al-Fayha	0–3	Al-Ettifaq	Al Majma'ah
20:30	Al-Safri (yellow card) 19'; Al-Khalaf (yellow card) 90+4'	Report	Vitinho 26', (yellow card) 34'; Sliti 30'; Mahnashi (yellow card) 80'; Al Salem 82'	Stadium: Al Majma'ah Sports City; Attendance: 2,271; Referee: Abdullah Al-Harbi

16 October 2022 8	Al-Nassr	4–0	Al-Fayha	Riyadh
17:45	Gustavo 75', 87'; Talisca 81', 84'	Report	Nasser (yellow card) 34'; Ryller (yellow card) 41'; Abousaban (yellow card) 71'	Stadium: Mrsool Park; Attendance: 12,763; Referee: Mohammed Al-Esmaiel

15 December 2022 9	Al-Khaleej	1–2	Al-Fayha	Khobar
15:30	Al-Khaibari 54' (o.g.); Al-Shanqiti (yellow card) 66'	Report	Nwakaeme 17' (pen.); Ryller (yellow card) 30'; Al-Khalaf 55', (yellow card) 83'	Stadium: Prince Saud bin Jalawi Stadium; Attendance: 1,000; Referee: Majed Al-Shamrani

26 December 2022 10	Al-Fayha	2–1	Al-Tai	Al Majma'ah
18:00	Paulinho 3'; Nwakaeme 21'; Al-Khalaf (yellow card) 26'; Abousaban (yellow card) 43'	Report	Qassem (yellow card) 30'; Dener 45+2'	Stadium: Al Majma'ah Sports City; Attendance: 2,079; Referee: Ahmed Al-Rumaikhani

30 December 2022 11	Al-Fateh	0–2	Al-Fayha	Al-Hasa
15:30	Bendebka (yellow card) 19'	Report	Mandash (yellow card) 15'; Nwakaeme (yellow card) 40', (goal) 77'; Ruiz (yellow card) 45+2'; Zidan 90+8'	Stadium: Prince Abdullah bin Jalawi Stadium; Attendance: 12,279; Referee: Sultan Al-Harbi

7 January 2023 12	Al-Fayha	2–2	Al-Batin	Al Majma'ah
15:30	Paulinho 15', 38', (yellow card) 86'; Al Freej (yellow card) 64'	Report	Y. Al-Shammari 22', (yellow card) 65'; Al-Hurayji (yellow card) 51'; Nasser (yellow card) 68'; Roa 82'	Stadium: Al Majma'ah Sports City; Attendance: 2,176; Referee: Sultan Al-Okairy

14 January 2023 13	Al-Raed	2–4	Al-Fayha	Buraidah
18:00	Fouzair 36'; Salem (yellow card) 40'; Đoković (yellow card) 41'; Mitriță 45+3', (yellow card) 90'	Report	Ruiz 41' (pen.); Pavkov 43'; Paulinho (yellow card) 44', (goal) 90+4'; Ryller 87'	Stadium: King Abdullah Sport City Stadium; Attendance: 1,667; Referee: Abdulsamad Bakri

19 January 2023 14	Al-Ittihad	3–0	Al-Fayha	Jeddah
18:00	Coronado 23'; Hamdallah 45+1' (pen.); Camara 45+3'; Z. Hawsawi (yellow card) 66'	Report	Ruiz (yellow card) 22'; Zidan (yellow card) 90+6'	Stadium: King Abdullah Sports City; Attendance: 19,694; Referee: Sandro Schärer (Switzerland)

4 February 2023 15	Al-Fayha	2–0	Al-Wehda	Al Majma'ah
18:00	Ruiz 45+3' (pen.); Mandash 62'; Zidan (yellow card) 80'	Report	Anselmo (yellow card) 20'; Y. Al-Harbi (yellow card) 69'	Stadium: Al Majma'ah Sports City; Attendance: 2,068; Referee: Mohammed Al-Esmaiel

10 February 2023 16	Damac	1–1	Al-Fayha	Khamis Mushait
16:00	Makin (yellow card) 4'; Soudani 37'	Report	Al-Khalaf (yellow card) 12'; Zidan (yellow card) 30'; Trajkovski 65'; Paulinho (yellow card) 79'	Stadium: Damac Club Stadium; Attendance: 3,646; Referee: Sami Al-Jires

23 February 2023 18	Al-Taawoun	1–1	Al-Fayha	Buraidah
16:00	Kadesh 90+4'	Report	Nasser (yellow card) 12'; Trajkovski 31'; Majrashi (yellow card) 90+3'; Stojković (yellow card) 90+8'; Al-Qaydhi (yellow card) 90+8'	Stadium: King Abdullah Sport City Stadium; Attendance: 4,706; Referee: Majed Al-Shamrani

2 March 2023 19	Al-Fayha	2–0	Abha	Al Majma'ah
16:00	Paulinho 45+2'; Stojković (yellow card) 85'; Mandash 90+7'	Report	Al-Kunaydiri (yellow card) 90+4'	Stadium: Al Majma'ah Sports City; Attendance: 5,086; Referee: Mohammed Al-Daqqash

9 March 2023 20	Al-Shabab	3–2	Al-Fayha	Riyadh
20:30	Boupendza 15'; Guanca 36'; Mina 39'; Al-Qahtani (yellow card) 69'; Al-Harbi (yellow card) 79'; Banega (yellow card) 87'	Report	Al-Shuwaish (yellow card) 44'; Santos 45+2' (o.g.); Ryller (yellow card) 49'; Nwakaeme 53'; Paulinho (yellow card) 66'; Al-Baqawi (yellow card) 87'	Stadium: Prince Faisal bin Fahd Stadium; Attendance: 2,298; Referee: Mohammed Al-Harbi

17 March 2023 21	Al-Fayha	1–1	Al-Adalah	Al Majma'ah
16:00	Al-Baqawi (yellow card) 63'; Nwakaeme 90+6'	Report	Al-Salem 35'; Al-Hamdhi (yellow card) 51'	Stadium: Al Majma'ah Sports City; Attendance: 3,716; Referee: Abdullah Al-Shehri

4 April 2023 17	Al-Fayha	0–2	Al-Hilal	Al Majma'ah
22:00	Al-Shuwaish (yellow card) 76'	Report	Ighalo 45+1', 90+2'; K. Al-Dawsari (yellow card) 52'	Stadium: Al Majma'ah Sports City; Attendance: 6,105; Referee: Abdullah Al-Kharbosh

9 April 2023 23	Al-Fayha	0–0	Al-Nassr	Al Majma'ah
22:00	Ruiz (yellow card) 71'; Stojković (yellow card) 82'	Report	Talisca (yellow card) 20'	Stadium: Al Majma'ah Sports City; Attendance: 6,087; Referee: Tamás Bognár (Hungary)

14 April 2023 22	Al-Ettifaq	1–0	Al-Fayha	Dammam
22:00	Niakaté 90+1', (yellow card) 90+9'	Report	Al-Baqawi (yellow card) 88'	Stadium: Prince Mohamed bin Fahd Stadium; Attendance: 3,510; Referee: Mohammed Al-Hoaish

28 April 2023 24	Al-Fayha	0–3	Al-Khaleej	Al Majma'ah
21:30	Ruiz (yellow card) 24'; Paulinho (yellow card) 80'; Nasser (yellow card) 84'	Report	Cikalleshi 23' (pen.); Martins (yellow card) 41', (goal) 54'; Poko 67'	Stadium: Al Majma'ah Sports City; Attendance: 2,665; Referee: Shukri Al-Hanfoush

2 May 2023 25	Al-Tai	2–1	Al-Fayha	Ha'il
21:30	Sayoud 6'; Semedo 38'	Report	Semedo 19' (o.g.)	Stadium: Prince Abdul Aziz bin Musa'ed Stadium; Attendance: 7,649; Referee: Abdulrahman Al-Sultan

9 May 2023 26	Al-Fayha	3–0	Al-Fateh	Al Majma'ah
19:00	Nwakaeme 38', (yellow card) 45+1'; Ruiz 45+3'; Nasser (yellow card) 60'; Trajkovski 90+5'	Report	Tello (yellow card) 90'	Stadium: Al Majma'ah Sports City; Attendance: 2,098; Referee: Sami Al-Jires

15 May 2023 27	Al-Batin	0–0	Al-Fayha	Hafar al-Batin
19:00		Report	Al-Khaibari (yellow card) 90+6'	Stadium: Al-Batin Club Stadium; Attendance: 3,517; Referee: Sultan Al-Harbi

22 May 2023 28	Al-Fayha	1–1	Al-Raed	Al Majma'ah
19:00	Al-Rashidi (yellow card) 43'; Trajkovski 80'	Report	Đoković 24'; Salem (yellow card) 58'; Al-Farhan (yellow card) 69'; Al-Fahad (yellow card) 72'; Khamis (yellow card) 90+1'	Stadium: Al Majma'ah Sports City; Attendance: 3,820; Referee: Sultan Okairy

27 May 2023 29	Al-Fayha	0–3	Al-Ittihad	Al Majma'ah
21:00	Nasser (yellow card) 45'	Report	Sharahili 3'; Romarinho 45+1', 85'; Al-Nashri (yellow card) 46'	Stadium: Al Majma'ah Sports City; Attendance: 6,231; Referee: Fábio Veríssimo (Portugal)

31 May 2023 30	Al-Wehda	0–1	Al-Fayha	Mecca
21:00	Bakshween (yellow card) 90'; Noor (yellow card) 90+2'	Report	Mandash 90+4', (yellow card) 90+5'; Al-Safri (yellow card) 90+5'	Stadium: King Abdul Aziz Stadium; Attendance: 284; Referee: Abdullah Al-Harbi

=== King Cup ===
All times are local, AST (UTC+3).

20 December 2022 Round of 16	Al-Fayha	3–1	Al-Khaleej	Al Majma'ah
18:00	Al-Zaqaan 29'; Paulinho (yellow card) 44'; Abousaban 45+1', (yellow card) 45+4'; Al Freej (yellow card) 82'; Mandash 90+5'	Report	Cikalleshi 19'; Al-Zahrani (yellow card) 63'; Morato (yellow card) 84'	Stadium: Al Majma'ah Sports City; Referee: Abdullah Al-Kharboush

13 March 2023 Quarter-finals	Al-Fayha	1–1 (a.e.t.) (3–4 p)	Al-Ittihad	Al Majma'ah
17:30	Ruiz (yellow card) 15'; Ryller 45+5'; Al-Shuwaish (yellow card) 63'; Nwakaeme (yellow card) 64'; Al-Safri (yellow card) 69'; Nasser (yellow card) 83'	Report	Romarinho (yellow card) 14'; Camara 16'; Hamed (yellow card) 105'; Al-Bishi (yellow card) 117'; Al-Saiari (yellow card) 120+2'	Stadium: Al Majma'ah Sports City; Referee: Ivan Kružliak (Slovakia)
	Penalties
	Nwakaeme (penalty missed); Abousaban (penalty scored); Al-Shamekh (penalty scored); Zidan (penalty scored); Al-Baqawi (penalty missed)		(penalty scored) Hamdallah; (penalty scored) Coronado; (penalty scored) Al-Saiari; (penalty scored) Bamsaud

=== Super Cup ===
All times are local, AST (UTC+3).

26 January 2023 Semi-finals	Al-Fayha	1–0	Al-Hilal	Riyadh
18:00	Paulinho 20', (yellow card) 82'; Stojković (yellow card) 27'; Al-Khaibari (yellow card) 90+5'	Report	Al-Bulaihi (yellow card) 66'; Abdulhamid (yellow card) 68'	Stadium: Prince Faisal bin Fahd Stadium; Attendance: 9,020; Referee: Szymon Marciniak (Poland)

29 January 2023 Final	Al-Ittihad	2–0	Al-Fayha	Riyadh
20:00	Hamdallah 3', 48'; Coronado (yellow card) 30'	Report	Al-Safri (red card) 24'	Stadium: King Fahd International Stadium; Attendance: 47,518; Referee: Fernando Rapallini (Argentina)

== Statistics ==
=== Appearances ===
Last updated on 31 May 2023.

No.	Pos	Nat	Player	Total		Pro League		King Cup		Super Cup	
No.	Pos	Nat	Player	Apps	Goals	Apps	Goals	Apps	Goals	Apps	Goals
Goalkeepers
1	GK	(Saudi Arabia) KSA	Moslem Al Freej	6	0	3+2	0	1	0	0	0
55	GK	(Saudi Arabia) KSA	Faisel Masrahi	0	0	0	0	0	0	0	0
88	GK	(Serbia) SRB	Vladimir Stojković	30	0	27	0	1	0	2	0
Defenders
2	DF	(Saudi Arabia) KSA	Mukhair Al-Rashidi	9	0	6+2	0	1	0	0	0
3	DF	(Saudi Arabia) KSA	Bander Nasser	31	0	27	0	1+1	0	2	0
4	DF	(Saudi Arabia) KSA	Sami Al-Khaibari	33	0	30	0	1	0	2	0
14	DF	(Saudi Arabia) KSA	Sultan Al-Harbi	0	0	0	0	0	0	0	0
17	DF	(Saudi Arabia) KSA	Abdullah Al-Shamekh	17	0	1+12	0	1+1	0	0+2	0
22	DF	(Saudi Arabia) KSA	Mohammed Al-Baqawi	33	0	28+1	0	2	0	2	0
33	DF	(Saudi Arabia) KSA	Hussein Al-Shuwaish	27	0	25	0	2	0	0	0
80	DF	(Saudi Arabia) KSA	Osama Al-Khalaf	15	1	9+3	1	1	0	1+1	0
98	DF	(Saudi Arabia) KSA	Muhannad Al-Qaydhi	13	0	5+4	0	1+1	0	0+2	0
Midfielders
6	MF	(Saudi Arabia) KSA	Saud Zidan	22	1	1+18	1	0+1	0	1+1	0
7	MF	(North Macedonia) MKD	Aleksandar Trajkovski	25	4	15+9	4	1	0	0	0
8	MF	(Saudi Arabia) KSA	Abdulrahman Al-Safri	20	0	11+6	0	0+1	0	1+1	0
10	MF	(Spain) ESP	Víctor Ruiz	32	3	25+3	3	1+1	0	2	0
11	MF	(Saudi Arabia) KSA	Khalid Kaabi	2	0	0+2	0	0	0	0	0
16	MF	(Saudi Arabia) KSA	Ali Al-Nemer	4	0	1+3	0	0	0	0	0
18	MF	(Brazil) BRA	Paulinho	31	6	28	5	1	0	2	1
26	MF	(Saudi Arabia) KSA	Ali Al-Zaqaan	16	1	3+10	0	1	1	1+1	0
27	MF	(Saudi Arabia) KSA	Sultan Mandash	32	5	21+7	4	1+1	1	2	0
37	MF	(Brazil) BRA	Ricardo Ryller	28	2	24	1	2	1	2	0
66	MF	(Saudi Arabia) KSA	Mohammed Abousaban	19	1	6+11	0	1+1	1	0	0
Forwards
9	FW	(Nigeria) NGR	Anthony Nwakaeme	28	9	23+2	9	1+1	0	1	0
19	FW	(Saudi Arabia) KSA	Mohammed Majrashi	15	0	1+11	0	0+2	0	0+1	0
23	FW	(Serbia) SRB	Milan Pavkov	26	1	11+12	1	1	0	1+1	0
99	FW	(Saudi Arabia) KSA	Malek Al-Abdulmenem	2	0	0+2	0	0	0	0	0
Player who made an appearance this season but have left the club
24	DF	(Saudi Arabia) KSA	Ahmed Bamsaud	1	0	1	0	0	0	0	0
77	MF	(Greece) GRE	Panagiotis Tachtsidis	1	0	1	0	0	0	0	0

=== Goalscorers ===
Rank	No.	Pos	Nat	Name	Pro League	King Cup	Super Cup	Total
1	9	FW	(Nigeria)	Anthony Nwakaeme	9	0	0	9
2	18	MF	(Brazil)	Paulinho	5	0	1	6
3	27	MF	(Saudi Arabia)	Sultan Mandash	4	1	0	5
4	7	MF	(North Macedonia)	Aleksandar Trajkovski	4	0	0	4
5	10	MF	(Spain)	Víctor Ruiz	3	0	0	3
6	37	MF	(Brazil)	Ricardo Ryller	1	1	0	2
7	6	MF	(Saudi Arabia)	Saud Zidan	1	0	0	1
7	23	FW	(Serbia)	Milan Pavkov	1	0	0	1
7	26	MF	(Saudi Arabia)	Ali Al-Zaqaan	0	1	0	1
7	66	MF	(Saudi Arabia)	Mohammed Abousaban	0	1	0	1
7	80	DF	(Saudi Arabia)	Osama Al-Khalaf	1	0	0	1
Own goal					2	0	0	2
Total					31	4	1	36

Last Updated: 31 May 2023

=== Assists ===
Rank	No.	Pos	Nat	Name	Pro League	King Cup	Super Cup	Total
1	10	MF	(Spain)	Víctor Ruiz	2	1	1	4
1	23	FW	(Serbia)	Milan Pavkov	4	0	0	4
3	7	MF	(North Macedonia)	Aleksandar Trajkovski	3	0	0	3
3	9	FW	(Nigeria)	Anthony Nwakaeme	3	0	0	3
3	27	MF	(Saudi Arabia)	Sultan Mandash	3	0	0	3
6	3	DF	(Saudi Arabia)	Bander Nasser	2	0	0	2
6	33	DF	(Saudi Arabia)	Hussein Al-Shuwaish	1	1	0	2
6	80	DF	(Saudi Arabia)	Osama Al-Khalaf	2	0	0	2
9	8	MF	(Saudi Arabia)	Abdulrahman Al-Safri	1	0	0	1
9	18	MF	(Brazil)	Paulinho	1	0	0	1
9	26	MF	(Saudi Arabia)	Ali Al-Zaqaan	1	0	0	1
9	37	MF	(Brazil)	Ricardo Ryller	1	0	0	1
Total					24	2	1	27

Last Updated: 31 May 2023

=== Clean sheets ===
Rank	No.	Pos	Nat	Name	Pro League	King Cup	Super Cup	Total
1	88	GK	(Serbia)	Vladimir Stojković	7	0	1	8
2	1	GK	(Saudi Arabia)	Moslem Al Freej	1	0	0	1
Total					7	0	1	8

Last Updated: 31 May 2023
