= Vladimir Stojković (footballer, born 1996) =

Portuguese footballer

Personal information
- Full name: Vladimir Stojković
- Date of birth: 4 October 1996 (age 30)
- Place of birth: Leça da Palmeira, Portugal
- Height: 1.92 m (6 ft 3 1/2 in)
- Position: Goalkeeper

Youth career
- 2003–2004: Leixões
- 2004–2007: Maia
- 2007–2015: Sporting CP

Senior career*
Years	Team	Apps	(Gls)
2015–2018	Sporting CP B	40	(0)
2018–2019	Sporting U23	6	(0)
2019–2020	Estoril	0	(0)
2020–2021	Leixões	3	(0)
2021–2022	Académica	11	(0)
2022–2023	Al-Okhdood	33	(0)
2023–2025	Al-Faisaly	31	(0)
2026	Yelimay	9	(0)

International career
2014	Portugal U18	1	(0)
- * Club domestic league appearances and goals as of 1 July 2026

Vladimir Stojković (Serbian Cyrillic: Владимир Стојковић; born 4 October 1996) is a Portuguese professional footballer who plays as a goalkeeper.

== Club career ==
Born in Leça da Palmeira, Matosinhos to a Serbian father, Stojković joined Sporting CP's youth system in 2007, aged 10. He made his professional debut on 21 February 2016, appearing for the reserves in a 1–1 home draw against S.C. Freamunde in the Segunda Liga.

Stojković played with the newly created under-23 team in the 2018–19 season, after which he left the club. On 10 August 2019, he signed a one-year contract with G.D. Estoril Praia also of the Portuguese second division. Only used in the under-23s, on 1 September of the following year he transferred to his hometown side Leixões S.C. where he had begun playing football aged 7.

On 28 January 2021, the free agent Stojković joined Académica de Coimbra still in the Portuguese second tier, on a five-month deal. On 5 July 2022, after his team's relegation, he agreed to a contract at Al-Okhdood Club in the Saudi First Division League.

In July 2023, Stojković moved to Al-Faisaly FC in the same country and league. On 7 February 2026, he signed for Kazakhstan Premier League club FC Yelimay.

== International career ==
Stojković was capped once by Portugal at under-18 level. His appearance was a 2–0 win over the United States in Mafra on 8 June 2014.

== Personal life ==
Stojković's father and uncle, respectively named Vladan and Vladimir, were also goalkeepers. Both spent several years in Portugal, and the latter was also a longtime Serbian international.
