= Ghislain Konan =

Ivorian footballer (born 1995)

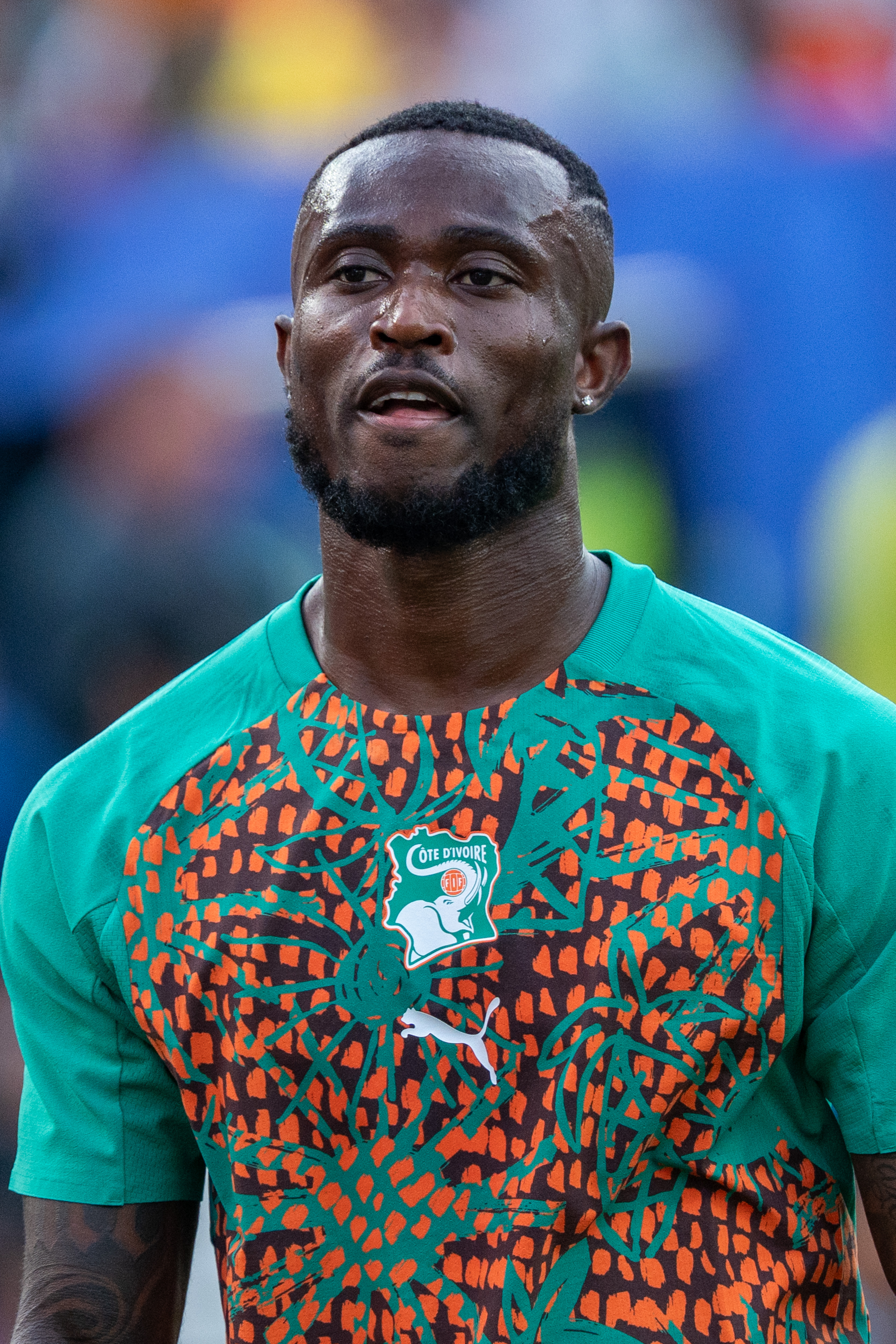
- Konan with the Ivory Coast in 2026

Personal information
- Full name: Ghislain N'Clomande Konan
- Date of birth: 27 December 1995 (age 30)
- Place of birth: Abidjan, Ivory Coast
- Height: 1.78 m (5 ft 10 in)
- Position: Left-back

Team information
- Current team: Wolverhampton Wanderers
- Number: 33

Youth career
- ASEC Mimosas

Senior career*
Years	Team	Apps	(Gls)
2013–2016	ASEC Mimosas		
2016	Vitória Guimarães B	20	(0)
2016–2018	Vitória Guimarães	45	(0)
2018–2022	Reims	95	(3)
2022–2024	Al-Nassr	32	(0)
2023–2024	→ Al-Fayha (loan)	26	(0)
2025	Burgos	2	(0)
2025–2026	Gil Vicente	30	(0)
2026–	Wolverhampton Wanderers	0	(0)

International career^{‡}
2017–	Ivory Coast	57	(0)
Medal record
Representing Ivory Coast
Men's football
Africa Cup of Nations
Winner	2023 Ivory Coast
- * Club domestic league appearances and goals as of 6 September 2026 ‡ National team caps and goals as of 19:10, 30 June 2026 (UTC)

Ghislain N'Clomande Konan (born 27 December 1995) is an Ivorian professional footballer who plays as a left-back for EFL Championship club Wolverhampton Wanderers and the Ivory Coast national team.

== Club career ==
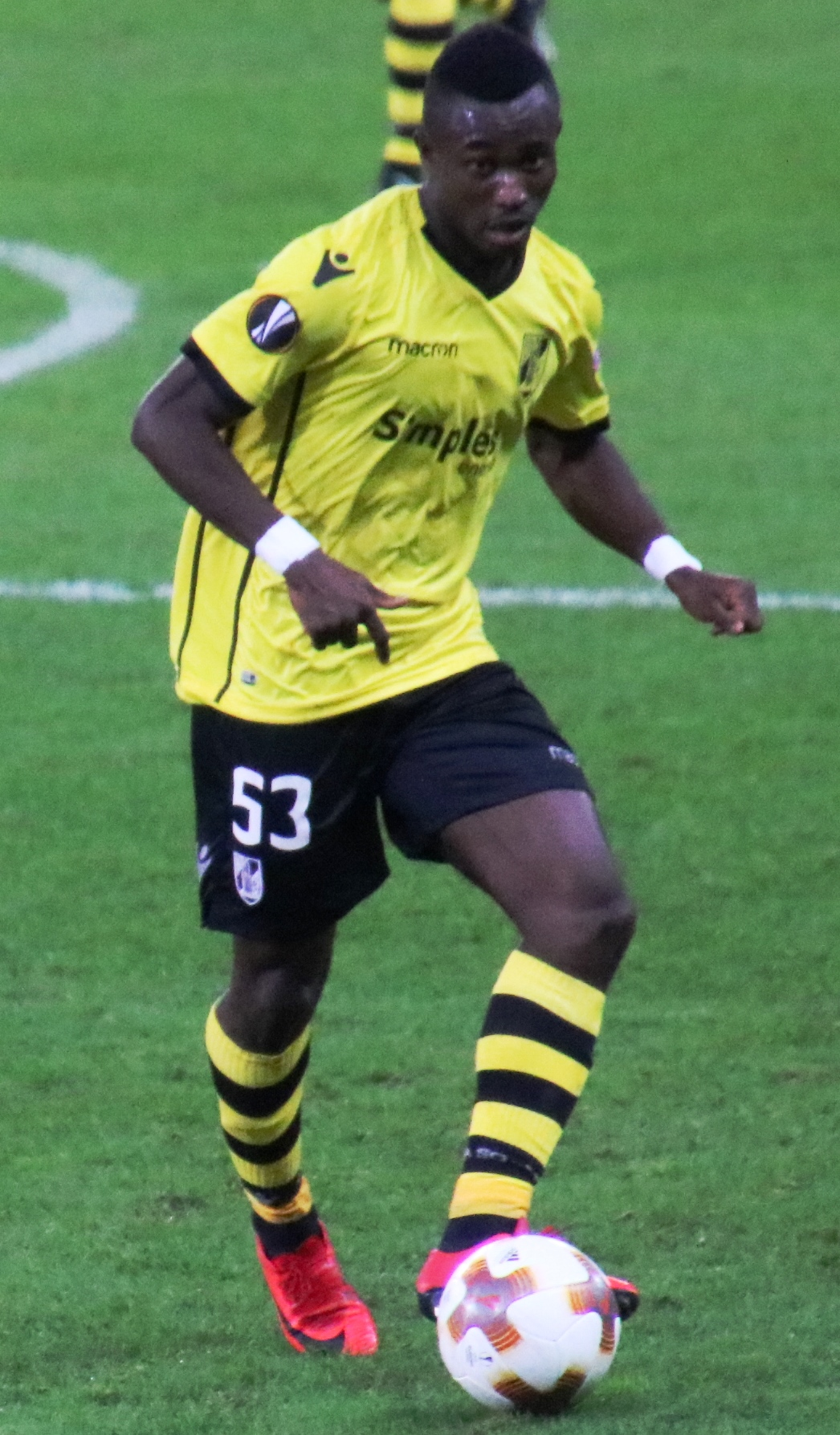
Konan playing for Vitória SC in 2017.

Konan made his professional debut in the Portuguese Segunda Liga for Vitória SC B on 17 February 2016 in a game against Atlético CP.

He made his Primeira Liga debut for Vitória SC on 10 December 2016, when he played the whole game in a 2–1 victory over Boavista.

Konan signed for Stade de Reims for a £3.6 million transfer fee from Vitória SC in summer 2017. He made his debut in a 1–0 win away against OGC Nice.

In July 2022, he joined Saudi Pro League club Al Nassr on a three-year deal. On 4 September 2023, Al Nassr sent Konan on a season-long loan to fellow Saudi Pro League side Al-Fayha.

On 30 January 2025, free agent Konan joined Spanish Segunda División side Burgos CF on a six-month contract.

On 2 September 2026, Konan signed a one-season deal with EFL Championship side Wolverhampton Wanderers.

== International career ==
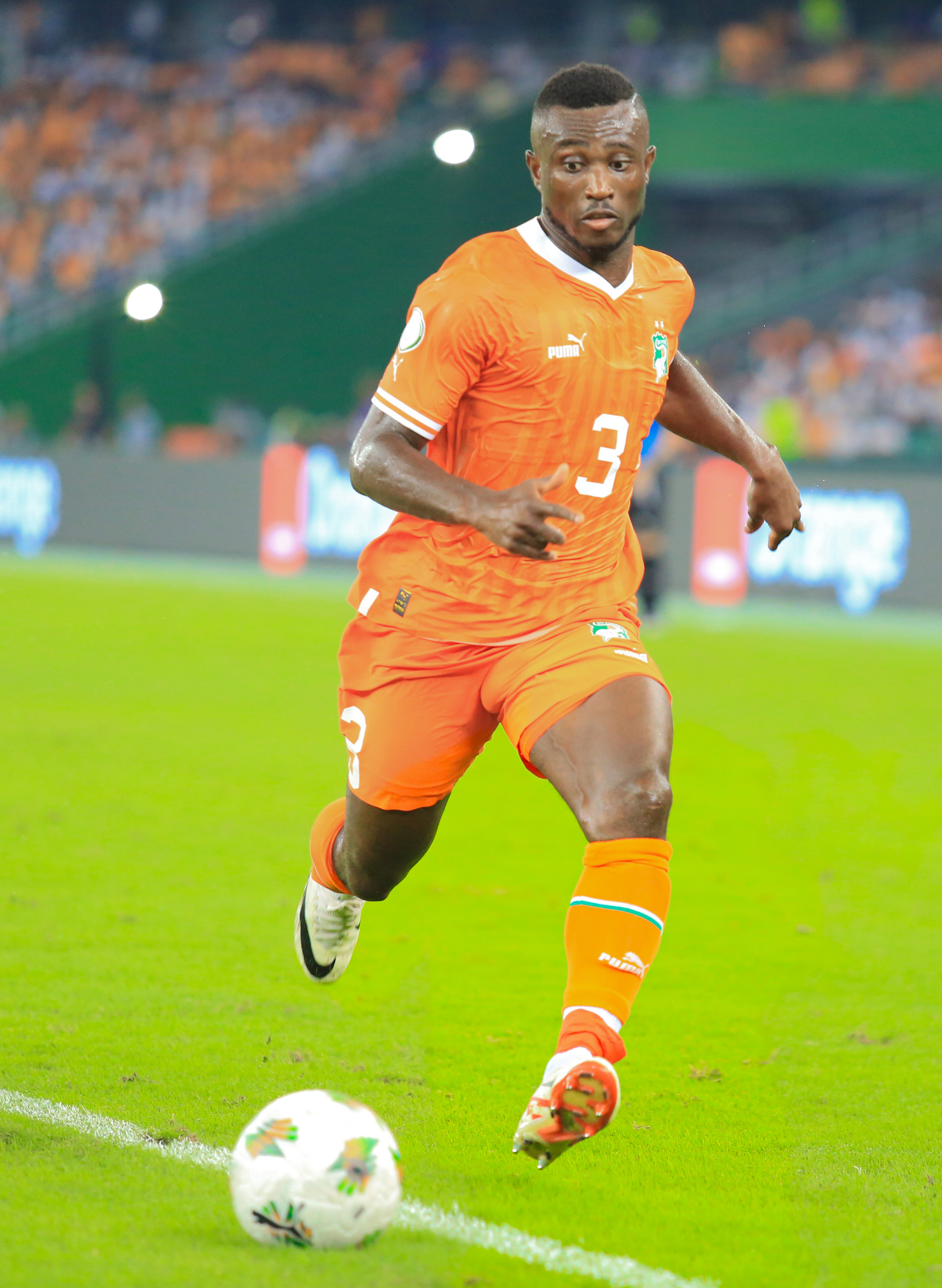
Konan playing for Ivory Coast in 2024.

Konan made his debut for Ivory Coast in a 2018 World Cup qualification 0–0 tie with Mali on 6 October 2017.

Konan was a member of the Ivory Coast's squad for the 2021 Africa Cup of Nations and played in all four of the team's matches as starting left-back.

In December 2023, Konan was named in the Ivory Coast's squad for the 2023 Africa Cup of Nations that ended up winning the tournament.

Konan was included in the list of Ivorian players selected by coach Emerse Faé to participate in the 2025 Africa Cup of Nations.

On 15 May 2026, Konan was integrated by Ivory Coast coach Emerse Faé in his list of 26 players in order to participate in the 2026 World Cup.

== Career statistics ==
=== Club ===
As of match played 17 May 2026

Appearances and goals by club, season and competition
Club	Season	League			National cup (Note: Includes Taça de Portugal, Coupe de France, King's Cup (Saudi Arabia))		League cup (Note: Includes Taça da Liga, Coupe de la Ligue)		Continental		Other		Total	
Club	Season	Division	Apps	Goals	Apps	Goals	Apps	Goals	Apps	Goals	Apps	Goals	Apps	Goals
Vitória B	2015–16	LigaPro	6	0	0	0	—		—		–		6	0
Vitória B	2016–17	LigaPro	14	0	0	0	—		—		—		14	0
Vitória B	Total		20	0	0	0	—		—		—		20	0
Vitória	2016–17	Primeira Liga	20	0	4	0	1	0	—		—		25	0
Vitória	2017–18	Primeira Liga	25	0	2	0	—		5 (Note: Appearances in UEFA Europa League)	0	—		32	0
Vitória	Total		45	0	6	0	1	0	5	0	—		57	0
Reims	2018–19	Ligue 1	20	0	1	0	0	0	—		—		21	0
Reims	2019–20	Ligue 1	16	0	0	0	1	0	—		—		17	0
Reims	2020–21	Ligue 1	31	2	0	0	0	0	2 (Note: Appearances in UEFA Europa League qualification)	0	—		33	2
Reims	2021–22	Ligue 1	28	1	0	0	0	0	—		—		28	1
Reims	Total		95	3	1	0	1	0	2	0	—		99	3
Al-Nassr	2022–23	Saudi Pro League	27	0	3	0	—		—		1 (Note: Appearance in Saudi Super Cup)	0	31	0
Al-Nassr	2023–24	Saudi Pro League	5	0	0	0	—		1 (Note: Appearance in AFC Champions League qualification)	0	6 (Note: Appearances in Arab Club Champions Cup)	0	12	0
Al-Nassr	Total		32	0	3	0	—		1	0	7	0	43	0
Al-Fayha (loan)	2023–24	Saudi Pro League	26	0	0	0	—		4 (Note: Appearances in AFC Champions League)	0	—		30	0
Burgos	2024–25	Segunda División	2	0	0	0	—		—		—		2	0
Gil Vicente	2025–26	Primeira Liga	30	0	1	0	—		—		—		31	0
Career total			251	3	11	0	2	0	12	0	7	0	282	3

=== International ===
As of match played 30 June 2026

Appearances and goals by national team and year
National team	Year	Apps	Goals
Ivory Coast	2017	3	0
Ivory Coast	2018	5	0
Ivory Coast	2019	3	0
Ivory Coast	2021	2	0
Ivory Coast	2022	12	0
Ivory Coast	2023	5	0
Ivory Coast	2024	11	0
Ivory Coast	2025	8	0
Ivory Coast	2026	8	0
Total		57	0

== Honours ==
Ivory Coast

- Africa Cup of Nations: 2023

Al-Nassr

- Arab Club Champions Cup: 2023

Individual

- Saudi Professional League Team of the Year: 2022–23
- Africa Cup of Nations Team of the Tournament: 2023
