= Rakan Kaabi =

Saudi Arabian footballer

Rakan Kaabi راكان كعبي
Personal information
- Full name: Rakan Ali Kaabi
- Date of birth: 2 December 2002 (age 23)
- Place of birth: Saudi Arabia
- Position: Midfielder

Team information
- Current team: Al-Ittihad
- Number: 60

Youth career
- –2022: Al-Ettifaq

Senior career*
Years	Team	Apps	(Gls)
2022–2023	Al-Ettifaq	1	(0)
2023–2026	Al-Fayha	55	(0)
2026–	Al-Ittihad	5	(0)
- * Club domestic league appearances and goals as of 8 September 2026

Rakan Kaabi (Arabic: راكان كعبي; born 2 December 2002) is a Saudi Arabian professional footballer who plays as a midfielder for Saudi Pro League club Al-Ittihad.

== Club career ==
Kaabi began his career at the youth team of Al-Ettifaq. On 3 October 2021, he signed his first professional contract with the club. He made his debut on 31 May 2023 in the league match against Al-Adalah, replacing Faisal Al-Ghamdi in the 87th minute. On 7 September 2023, Kaabi joined Al-Fayha on a three-year deal. He made his debut for Al-Fayha on 26 September 2023 by starting against Al-Riyadh in the King Cup round of 32 fixture. On 3 October 2023, Kaabi made his continental debut for Al-Fayha in the AFC Champions League group stage match against Uzbekistani side Pakhtakor. On 3 November 2023, Kaabi made his league debut for Al-Fayha as a substitute in the 3–3 draw against Al-Tai.

== Career statistics ==
=== Club ===
As of 27 May 2024

Club	Season	League		King Cup		Asia		Other		Total	
Club	Season	Apps	Goals	Apps	Goals	Apps	Goals	Apps	Goals	Apps	Goals
Al-Ettifaq	2022–23	1	0	0	0	—		—		1	0
Al-Fayha	2023–24	16	0	2	0	6	0	—		24	0
Career totals		17	0	2	0	6	0	0	0	25	0
