= Milan Pavkov =

Serbian footballer (born 1994)

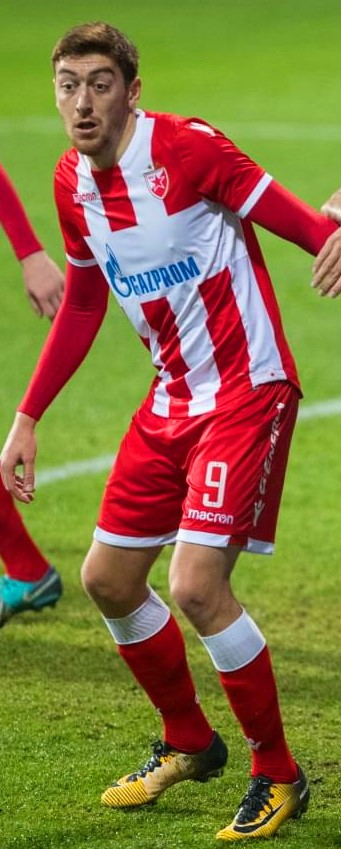
- Pavkov with Red Star Belgrade in 2017

Personal information
- Full name: Milan Pavkov
- Date of birth: 9 February 1994 (age 32)
- Place of birth: Novi Sad, FR Yugoslavia
- Height: 1.93 m (6 ft 4 in)
- Position: Centre-forward

Team information
- Current team: Čukarički
- Number: 50

Senior career*
Years	Team	Apps	(Gls)
2012–2013	Novi Sad	0	(0)
2012–2013	→ Mladost Bački Petrovac (loan)		
2013–2015	ČSK Čelarevo	54	(26)
2015–2016	Vojvodina	13	(0)
2016	Radnički Niš	20	(5)
2017–2022	Red Star Belgrade	106	(49)
2017–2018	→ Radnički Niš (loan)	33	(23)
2022–2024	Al-Fayha	26	(1)
2024–	Čukarički	47	(3)

International career
2019	Serbia	1	(0)
- * Club domestic league appearances and goals as of 12 June 2026

Milan Pavkov (Serbian Cyrillic: Милан Павков; born 9 February 1994) is a Serbian professional footballer who plays as a centre forward for Čukarički.

== Club career ==
=== ČSK Čelarevo ===
After episodes with FK Novi Sad and FK Mladost Bački Petrovac, Pavkov joined ČSK Čelarevo for the 2013–14 season. In the first season playing for new club, Pavkov made 27 appearances and scored 8 goals. After the 2014–15 season, in which Pavkov finished as the best goalscorer of the Serbian League Vojvodina with 18 goals in 27 matches, ČSK Čelarevo was promoted in the First League.

=== Vojvodina ===
After solid games with ČSK Čelarevo, Pavkov went on trial with Vojvodina in the summer of 2015, and later signed a contract. He made his Serbian SuperLiga debut in a match against Mladost Lučani, played on 9 August 2015. On 2 June 2016, Pavkov and Vojvodina mutually terminated their contract.

=== Radnički Niš ===
On 4 July 2016, Pavkov signed a three-year contract with Serbian SuperLiga side Radnički Niš. Pavkov scored 2 goals against Voždovac on 10 September 2016, being nominated for the best player of the 8th SuperLiga fixture. He also scored 3 more goals until the end of 2016, in matches against Partizan, Rad and Red Star Belgrade.

=== Red Star Belgrade ===
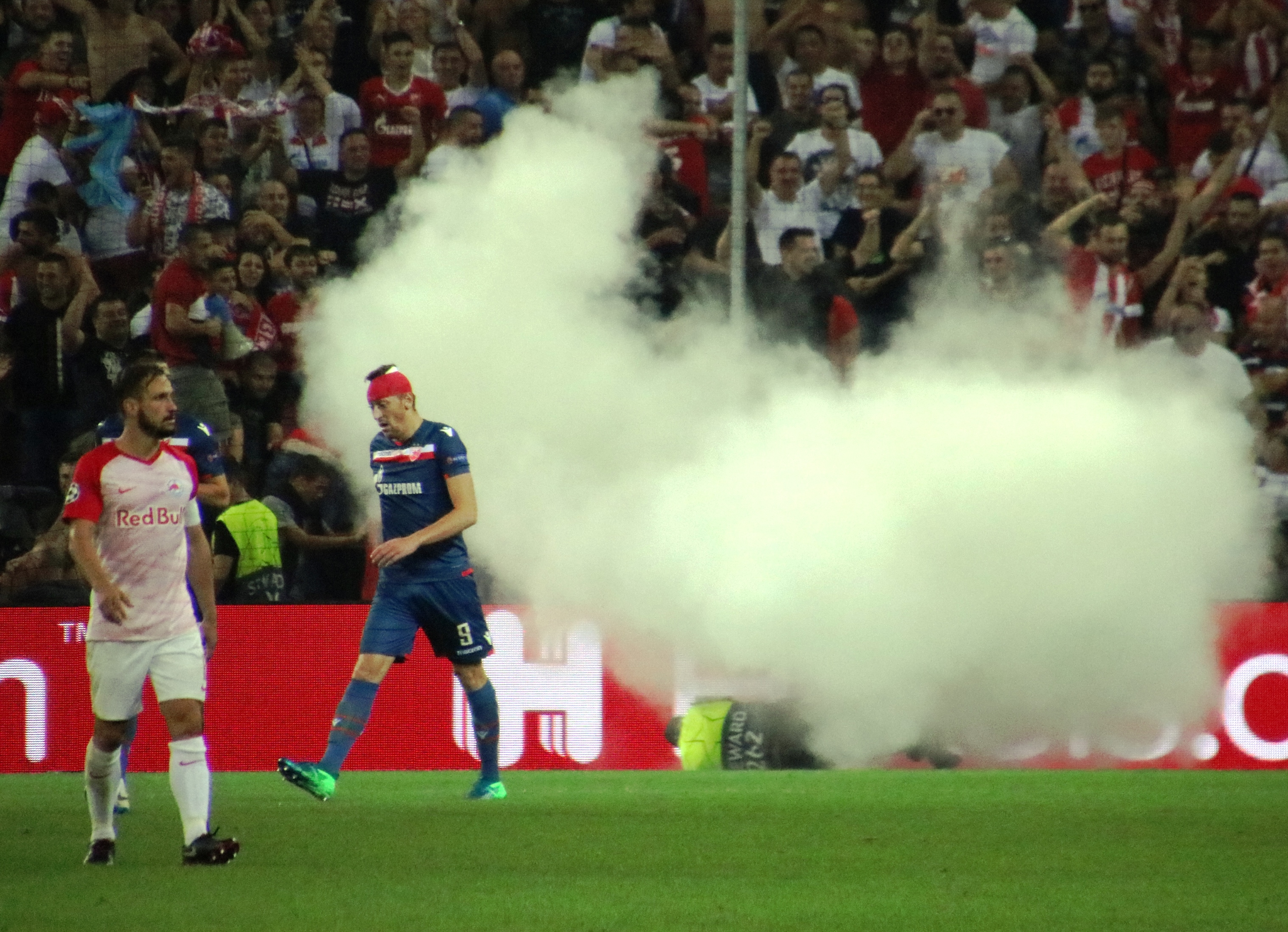
Pavkov in action for Red Star Belgrade in 2018 against Red Bull Salzburg

At the beginning of 2017, Pavkov transferred to Red Star Belgrade on a 2 1/2-year deal for a €300,000 fee in two installments. He made his debut replacing Damien Le Tallec in the 85th minute of the match against Novi Pazar on 18 February 2017. He also scored one goal for reserves in home defeat against Kolubara. After he missed the rest of season because of injury, Pavkov returned in squad for the next season. Pavkov made his first appearance, of the new season, in the first leg of the first qualifying round for 2017–18 UEFA Europa League, replacing Richmond Boakye in the last minutes of the match against Floriana.

On 27 July 2017, Pavkov moved back to Radnički Niš on a one-year loan deal. On 13 May 2018, Pavkov was sent off during the away match against Spartak Subotica, which was the first red card in his professional career. During the 2017–18 Serbian SuperLiga campaign, Pavkov scored 23 goals on 33 played matches, making himself second scorer of the season, behind Aleksandar Pešić.

Returning to Red Star in 2018, Pavkov passed the whole summer pre-season with the club under coach Vladan Milojević. After Aleksandar Pešić left the club, Pavkov was named into the 20-man squad for the first leg of the first qualifying round for 2018–19 UEFA Champions League campaign, against Spartaks Jūrmala. He joined that match as a substitute for injured Nikola Stojiljković in 18th minute of the game. On 12 August 2018, Pavkov made his first start for Red Star, when he scored twice in 3–0 victory over Spartak Subotica. On 6 November, he scored both goals in a 2–0 win against Liverpool in the Champions League group stage. On 12 December 2018, Pavkov signed an extension of his contract with Red Star to December 2022.

On 13 August 2021, Pavkov extended his contract with Red Star to summer of 2024.

=== Al-Fayha ===
On 28 August 2022, Pavkov signed a two-year contract with Saudi Professional League club Al-Fayha.

== International career ==
Pavkov was called up to the Serbia national team for the first time in March 2019 for games against Germany and Portugal, replacing Aleksandar Prijović who had to withdraw from the squad due to injury. He made his debut on 20 March 2019 as a substitute against Germany, replacing Luka Jović. He received a straight red card in the 90th minute of the game for a challenge on Leroy Sané.

== Career statistics ==
=== Club ===
As of end of 2023–24 season

Appearances and goals by club, season and competition
Club	Season	League			Cup		Continental		Other		Total	
Club	Season	Division	Apps	Goals	Apps	Goals	Apps	Goals	Apps	Goals	Apps	Goals
ČSK Čelarevo	2013–14	Serbian League Vojvodina	27	8	—		—		—		27	8
ČSK Čelarevo	2014–15	Serbian League Vojvodina	27	18	—		—		—		27	18
ČSK Čelarevo	Total		54	26	—		—		—		54	26
Vojvodina	2015–16	Serbian SuperLiga	13	0	2	0	1	0	—		16	0
Radnički Niš	2016–17	Serbian SuperLiga	20	5	1	0	—		—		21	5
Red Star Belgrade	2016–17	Serbian SuperLiga	1	0	0	0	—		—		1	0
Red Star Belgrade	2017–18	Serbian SuperLiga	0	0	—		1	0	—		1	0
Red Star Belgrade	2018–19	Serbian SuperLiga	27	12	4	1	8	2	—		39	15
Red Star Belgrade	2019–20	Serbian SuperLiga	20	7	1	0	8	2	—		29	9
Red Star Belgrade	2020–21	Serbian SuperLiga	25	14	4	0	3	1	—		32	15
Red Star Belgrade	2021–22	Serbian SuperLiga	29	11	5	1	9	2	—		43	14
Red Star Belgrade	2022–23	Serbian SuperLiga	4	5	0	0	3	1	—		7	6
Red Star Belgrade	Total		106	49	14	2	32	8	—		152	59
Radnički Niš (loan)	2017–18	Serbian SuperLiga	33	23	1	0	—		—		34	23
Al-Fayha	2022–23	Saudi Pro League	23	1	1	0	—		2 (Note: Appearances in Saudi Super Cup)	0	26	1
Al-Fayha	2023–24	Saudi Pro League	3	0	0	0	1 (Note: Appearances in AFC Champions League)	0	—		4	0
Al-Fayha	Total		26	1	1	0	1	0	2	0	30	1
Čukarički	2023–24	Serbian SuperLiga	8	2	1	0	—		—		9	2
Career total			260	105	20	2	34	8	2	0	316	115

== Honours ==
ČSK Čelarevo

- Serbian League Vojvodina: 2014–15

Red Star Belgrade

- Serbian SuperLiga: 2018–19, 2019–20, 2020–21, 2021–22
- Serbian Cup: 2020–21, 2021–22

Individual

- Serbian SuperLiga Player of the Week: 2020–21 (Round 25), 2021–22 (Round 21), 2022–23 (Round 3)
