= Vladan Stojković =

Serbian footballer

Personal information
- Date of birth: 22 January 1971 (age 55)
- Height: 1.94 m (6 ft 4 in)
- Position: Goalkeeper

Youth career
- Crvena Zvezda

Senior career*
Years	Team	Apps	(Gls)
1990–1991	Spartak Subotica	15	(0)
1991–1993	Mačva Šabac		
1993–1994	Ovarense		
1994–2000	Leça	92+	(0)
- * Club domestic league appearances and goals

Vladan Stojković (born 22 January 1971) is a retired Serbian football goalkeeper.

He is a brother of Vladimir Stojković and father of Vladimir Stojković, both fellow goalkeepers.
