= Vladimir Stojković =

Serbian footballer (born 1983)

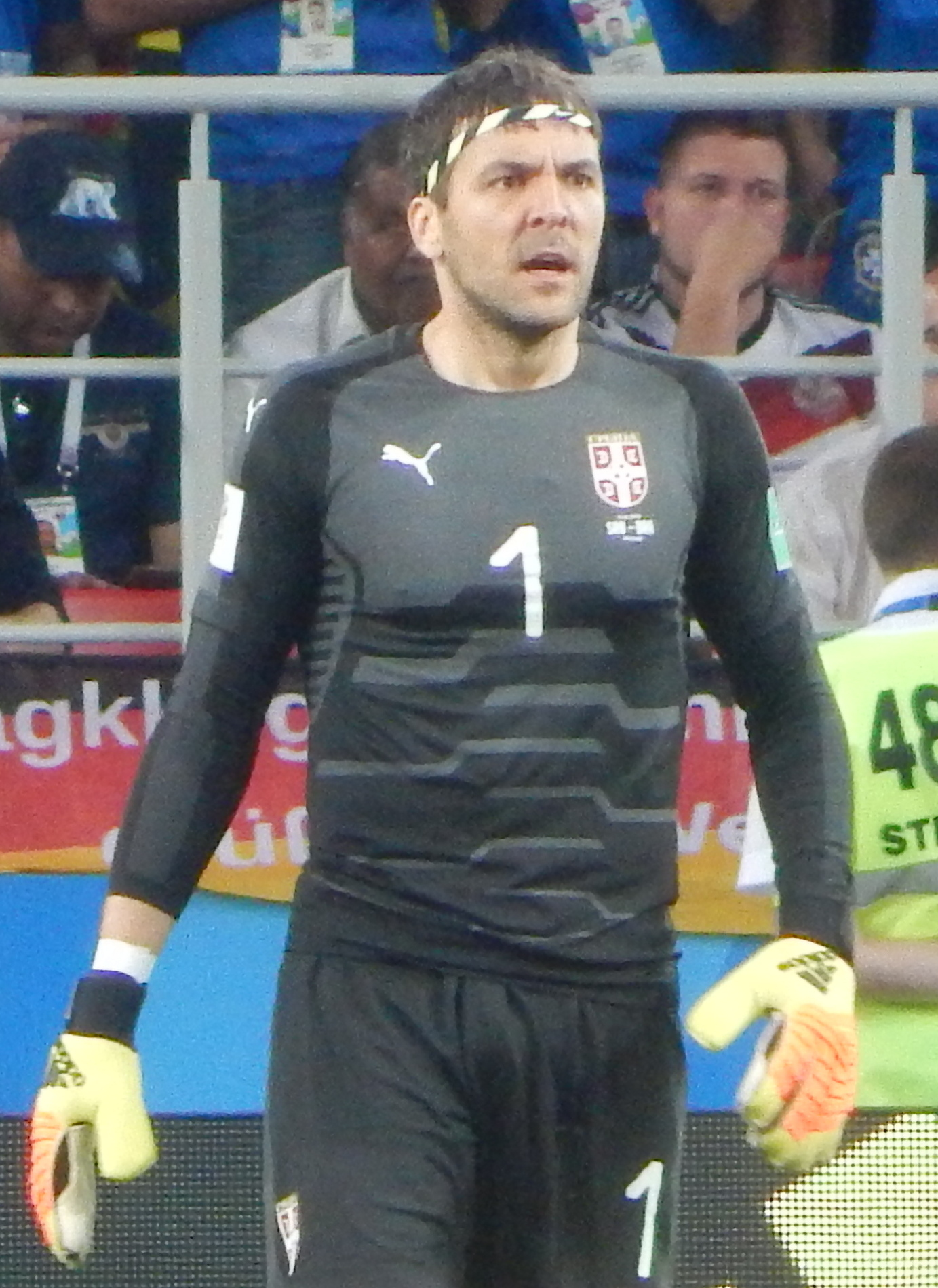
- Stojković with Serbia at the 2018 FIFA World Cup

Personal information
- Full name: Vladimir Stojković
- Date of birth: 28 July 1983 (age 43)
- Place of birth: Loznica, SR Serbia, SFR Yugoslavia
- Height: 1.96 m (6 ft 5 in)
- Position: Goalkeeper

Team information
- Current team: Čukarički
- Number: 88

Youth career
- Loznica
- Red Star Belgrade

Senior career*
Years	Team	Apps	(Gls)
2001–2003	Red Star Belgrade	2	(0)
2003	→ Leotar (loan)	4	(0)
2004–2005	Zemun	34	(0)
2005–2006	Red Star Belgrade	21	(0)
2006–2007	Nantes	10	(0)
2007	→ Vitesse (loan)	8	(0)
2007–2011	Sporting CP	9	(0)
2009	→ Getafe (loan)	5	(0)
2010	→ Wigan Athletic (loan)	4	(0)
2010–2011	→ Partizan (loan)	26	(0)
2011–2013	Partizan	60	(1)
2014	Ergotelis	11	(0)
2014–2016	Maccabi Haifa	66	(0)
2016–2017	Nottingham Forest	20	(0)
2017–2021	Partizan	94	(0)
2021–2024	Al-Fayha	86	(0)
2025	Radnički 1923	6	(0)
2026–	Čukarički	4	(0)

International career^{‡}
2004–2006	Serbia and Montenegro U21	24	(0)
2008	Serbia Olympic (O.P.)	3	(0)
2006–2018	Serbia	84	(0)
Medal record
Men's football
Representing Serbia and Montenegro
UEFA European Under-21 Championship
Runner-up	2004 Germany
- * Club domestic league appearances and goals as of 26 May 2026 ‡ National team caps and goals as of 27 June 2018

Vladimir Stojković (Serbian Cyrillic: Владимир Стојковић, pronounced [ʋlǎdimiːr stǒːjkoʋitɕ]; born 28 July 1983) is a Serbian professional footballer who plays as a goalkeeper for Serbian SuperLiga club Čukarički.

During his career he played for the two biggest clubs in his country, Red Star and Partizan, but also represented teams in nine other countries, notably with Sporting CP who loaned him several times for the duration of his contract.

A Serbia international on 84 occasions, Stojković was selected for three World Cups and the 2008 Olympics.

== Early life ==
Born in Loznica, Socialist Federal Republic of Yugoslavia, Stojković was born into a sporting family. His father Vladeta (d. 2007) was a football goalkeeper while his mother Kosa (1949–2012) was a track and field athlete, competing primarily in the discus throw but also in javelin and hammer throw.

Following in his father's footsteps, adolescent Vladimir took up football goalkeeping, joining his local club FK Loznica's youth system. The youngster would soon switch to Red Star Belgrade's youth setup

== Club career ==
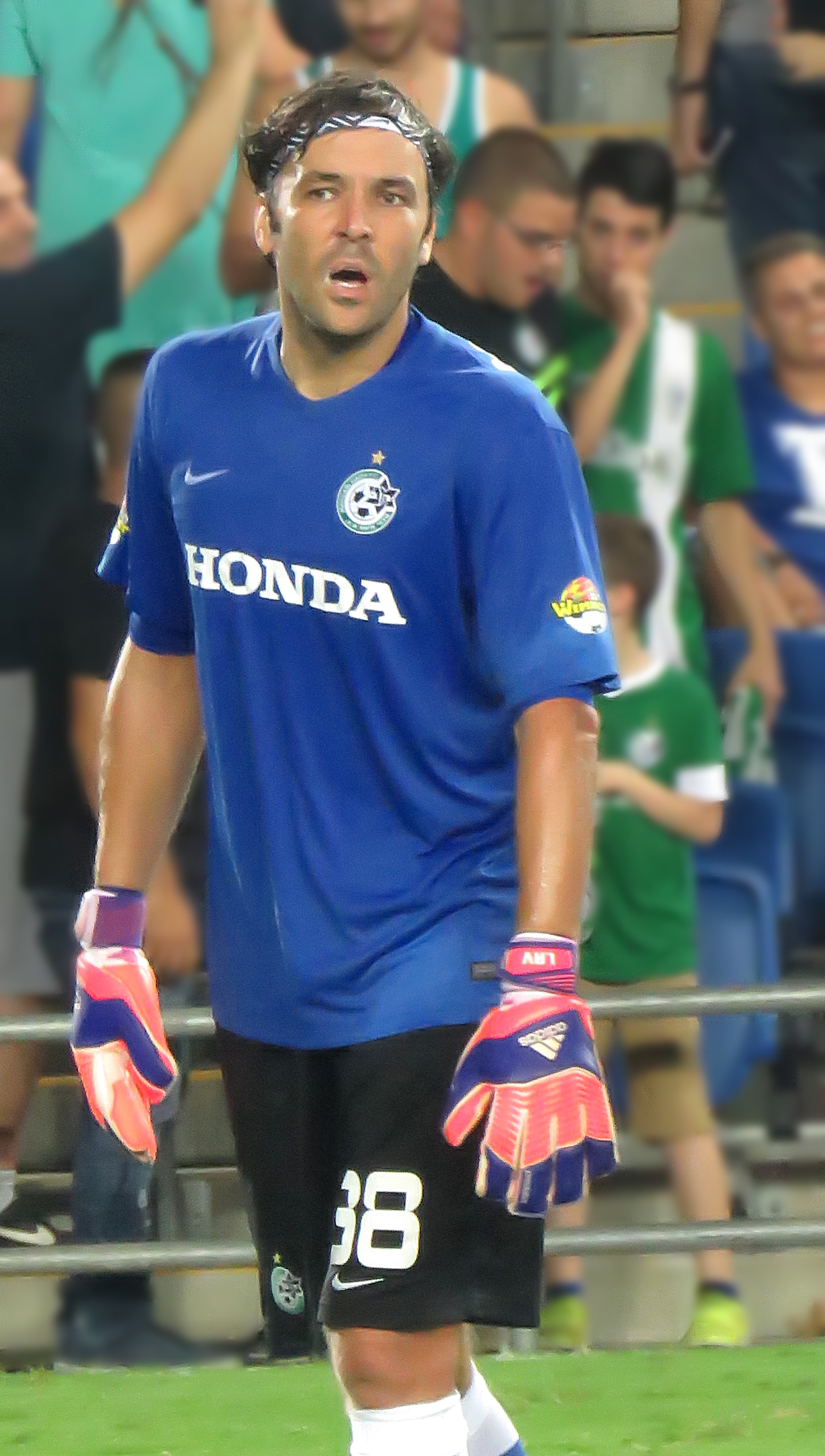
Stojković with Maccabi Haifa F.C. in 2015

=== Red Star Belgrade ===
Entering the Red Star Belgrade full squad under head coach Zoran Filipović, Stojković was initially overshadowed by Vladimir Dišljenković, appearing only in one league match during the 2001–02 Yugoslav league season and one more in the following campaign.

Due to Dišljenković's status as Red Star's first choice goalkeeper, further cemented by the return of head coach Slavoljub Muslin, the club loaned Stojković out in late June 2003 to the Bosnia-Herzegovina champions FK Leotar, who were reinforcing the squad ahead of the UEFA Champions League qualifying rounds. He appeared in each of their four qualifying matches under head coach Milan Jovin, being eliminated in the second round.

However, after only two months in Trebinje, Stojković left the club, reportedly over unpaid wages. Returning to Belgrade, he attempted to secure a spot on the Red Star roster, but manager Muslin sent him away. After his Red Star contract was terminated, Stojković started training privately with goalkeeping coach Tomo Savić, in order to stay in competitive shape while waiting for the January 2004 transfer window to open up.

=== Zemun ===
Stojković joined FK Zemun in the 2004 winter transfer window. Under head coach Dušan Mitošević, the 20-year-old was initially backup to Miloš Adamović. His first appearance incidentally came against his former side Red Star and, although his new team lost, he made a penalty shot save on Marko Pantelić, and went on to appear in five more league matches during the remainder of the campaign.

Going into his second season with Zemun, Stojković was undisputed starter, appearing in 28 league games as they finished in fifth position. During spring 2005, he made a string of saves during the league match against Red Star in a hard-fought 0–0 draw, a result that suited FK Partizan, who eventually won the national championship.

=== Return to Red Star ===
In the summer of 2005, six months after Dišljenković's transfer to Ukraine's FC Metalurh Donetsk, Stojković returned to Red Star where he initially was an understudy to the experienced Ivan Ranđelović. However, ahead of the UEFA Cup first round return leg trip to S.C. Braga, head coach Walter Zenga promoted him to first-choice, and the player seized the opportunity, immediately impressing in the new role as the team defeated the Portuguese on away goals to qualify for the group stages.

It would be at this stage of the competition that Stojković would get his most memorable moment of the season, saving a penalty from Antonio Cassano who attempted a Panenka-shot, as Red Star beat AS Roma 3–1 at home. The club won the league and cup double.

=== Nantes ===
Stojković moved to FC Nantes in summer 2006 for a rumoured €3 million, in order to replace departing Mickaël Landreau.

After a promising first few Ligue 1 matches, however, the Serb's form rapidly declined, and, shortly before the winter break, he lost the starting job to 20-year-old understudy Vincent Briant. Simultaneously, a vicious rift emerged within the squad that led to a series of poor results and the dismissal of the manager; Stojković fell out of favour with new coach Michel Der Zakarian, and was encouraged to seek a transfer or a loan when French star keeper Fabien Barthez was persuaded to come out of retirement and sign for the rest of the campaign.

In January 2007, Stojković was shipped off to SBV Vitesse on a six-month loan. On 3 March 2007, he debuted in Eredivisie, a 2–3 home loss against SBV Excelsior.

=== Sporting CP ===
On 11 July 2007, Stojković signed a five-year contract with Sporting CP, which paid €1.1 million to Nantes. He started out well, but got injured towards the end of the first half of the season in Portugal and lost his place to youngster Rui Patrício; after recovering he never managed to reclaim his place in the starting eleven, being demoted to as low as third-choice after a run-in with head coach Paulo Bento.

In July 2008, Sporting allowed Stojković to go to a trial at Premier League side Everton, with a view to a loan deal. However, on 22 July, he left his first training session after only an hour without explanation. The club's spokesperson said that Everton lost interest and that they'd been warned earlier that Stojković is a "complicated character"; the player denied walking out, saying "Everything went fine, I didn't have any problem. What I've read in the Portuguese press is wrong. I'm not someone who creates problems".

Stojković continued at Sporting in the beginning of 2008–09, but did not play any minutes in the league.

==== Loan to Getafe ====
In January 2009 he went on loan to La Liga's Getafe CF until the end of the campaign, the Madrid-based team becoming his fifth in less than three years.

On 12 April 2009 – three months after arriving – due to first-choice Jacobo's suspension following a red card, and Argentine Óscar Ustari still convalescing from a severe injury, Stojković made his debut with Getafe, keeping a clean sheet in a 1–0 win at Sevilla FC. Six days later he started at home against FC Barcelona, and made the highlight reel with a string of spectacular saves on Thierry Henry, Lionel Messi and Gerard Piqué, though the opponents still won 1–0 on a deflected first half goal.

Towards the end of the season, Getafe expressed interest in a permanent deal, but could not agree on price with Sporting. According to his agent Zoran Stojadinović, the Spaniards offered Sporting €500,000 plus 25% of a future transfer, but the Portuguese refused.

==== Return to Sporting ====
Back at Sporting for 2009–10 meant more frustration for Stojković, as he continued to be out of head coach Bento's plans. In late October 2009, he publicly acknowledged that his chances of securing a place in the team under the manager were minimal, also intimating that he was willing to take a pay cut in order to go to a club where he would be assured of playing, in order to stay match fit ahead of the 2010 FIFA World Cup; Bento was forced to resign in early November 2009 due to poor results, but that did not improve the player's status, as new coach Carlos Carvalhal continued omitting him from his squads.

Controversy was also raised by the report in the Portuguese tabloid Correio da Manhã suggesting that teammates João Moutinho, Ânderson Polga, Liédson and Marco Caneira, together with president José Eduardo Bettencourt wanted Stojković out of the club for publicly displaying happiness at Bento's departure. However, this was immediately denied on the club's website.

==== Loan to Wigan ====
In late December 2009, it was announced that Stojković would be loaned to Wigan Athletic for a six-month period, acting as cover for Richard Kingson while the Ghanaian was on international duty at the 2010 Africa Cup of Nations. The move was officially confirmed on 7 January 2010, and he became the fourth Serb goalkeeper in history to appear in English football after Radojko Avramović, Petar Borota and Saša Ilić.

Stojković made his debut for the Latics on 23 January 2010, in a 2–2 away draw with Notts County in the fourth round of the FA Cup – it was his first competitive appearance at club level after his loan return from Getafe. His Premier League debut came four days later at home against Blackburn Rovers, where he put in a jittery performance in a 1–2 loss, notably being at fault in the opposition's opening goal when he raced off his line, weakly punching away Brett Emerton's deep free kick with the ball getting to Morten Gamst Pedersen who half-volleyed it into the unguarded net; after Chris Kirkland recovered from injury, he was dropped to the bench.

Stojković reappeared for Wigan on 29 March 2010 in an away fixture against Manchester City: in the 72nd minute of the game, a mix-up between the goalie and defender Paul Scharner allowed Emmanuel Adebayor to flick the ball to Carlos Tevez who slotted into an open net; At the end of the season, the English turned down the option of making the loan a permanent deal.

=== Partizan ===
On 27 August 2010, Stojković signed a season-long loan deal with Serbian champions Partizan. The deal between Sporting and Partizan was structured so that the player's €45,000-per month salary would be paid 80% by the former and 20% by the latter, meaning that for the ten months of his loan spell Sporting would pay him €360,000 in total while the other party would contribute €90,000.

Seeking another option in goal for the Champions League group stage following subpar performances of first-choice Radiša Ilić, Partizan brought in a player who, only two months earlier, had become an honorary member of rivals Red Star in a public ceremony where he was given membership card number 134. Due to this, Stojković's move was highly controversial and caused a great deal of disappointment and anger among Red Star fans as well as plenty of reaction in the Serbian general public. Some press outlets even reported that being aware of the controversial nature of his move, he himself apparently insisted on a clause that allowed him to skip derby matches, the first of which was scheduled for 23 October 2010; when asked about it, he denied the existence of such clause but, almost immediately after the news hit the press, he started receiving threats, including death threats as well as ones against his family.

Stojković made his official Partizan debut on 4 September 2010 in a 2–0 home victory over FK Hajduk Kula, where he hardly was tested as the visiting side concentrated mostly on defending. On 23 October, the long-awaited derby against Red Star took place: due to unsavoury events leading up to the match, there were general concerns about it turning into yet another violent incident and in particular about the goalkeeper's personal safety but, despite immense pressure and tension, he was unwavering about his desire to be in goal for the match. The game ended without a single incident as Partizan recorded a 1–0 away win and, after the final whistle, he ran to the south stand where Partizan's most loyal fans gathered, lifting his jersey to reveal a T-shirt that read: "Please Forgive My Ugly Past"; the move wasn't well received in the general public with local press accusing the player of being tacky and needlessly raising the tension by provoking his old club; however, he claimed he was only trying to show his feelings and insisted he was not being provocative.

On 11 August 2012, Stojković scored the first goal of his career, netting from a penalty in the first round of the season, a 7–0 home trouncing of FK BSK Borča. On 7 October, after suffering an injury against FK Javor Ivanjica, he was sidelined for the rest of the year, but was still named in the league's best eleven due to his performances.

In December 2013, Stojković was voted FK Partizan Player of the Year by the club's fans, occurring simultaneously with the expiration of his contract with the club.

=== Later years ===
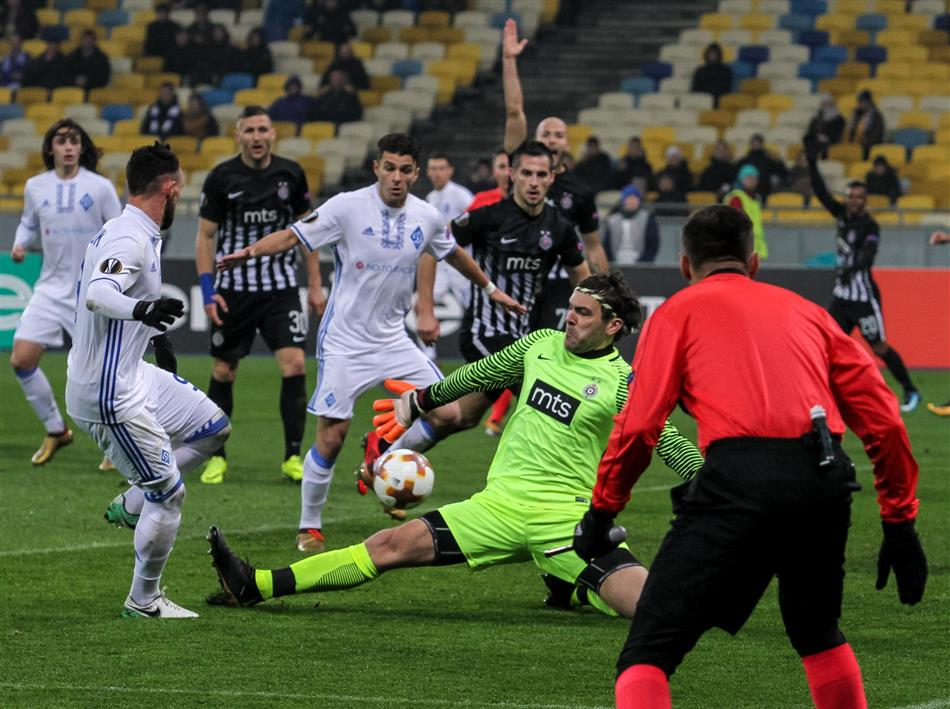
Stojković making his signature save while with Partizan in 2017

On 25 January 2014, free agent Stojković signed a six-month contract with Ergotelis in the Super League Greece. He made his debut with his new team on 2 February 2014, in a 1–0 away win against Panionios.

Stojković signed a three-year contract with Maccabi Haifa F.C. in the Israeli Premier League on 10 June 2014. Two years later he returned to England, agreeing to a two-year deal at Championship club Nottingham Forest, and playing his first game on 11 September 2016 in a 2–2 away draw against Aston Villa.

On 15 August 2017, Stojković returned to his former club Partizan. He made his debut two days later, in a 0–0 home draw to Videoton FC in the first leg of the Europa League play-off round. In the second game Partizan was more successful with an overall triumph of 4–0 and therefore won a new participation in the group stage of the Europa League. On 27 August, Stojković made his comeback debut in goal for Partizan in the domestic championship games. When he was named Man of the Match at the 155th eternal derby against the hosts Red Star in the game that ended in a 0–0 draw at the Rajko Mitić Stadium.

Stojković agreed to sign a new four-year contract on 23 January 2018. After the retirement of Saša Ilić, he was appointed the new captain.

On 28 July 2021, Stojković joined Saudi club Al-Fayha on a one-year deal, signed by compatriot Vuk Rašović. On 19 May 2022, he won the 2022 King Cup final with Al-Fayha against Al Hilal, to be their first title ever in that competition.

On 25 June 2025, Stojković returned to Serbia, joining SuperLiga club Radnički 1923. In January 2026, after having made eight appearances for the Kragujevac-based side, he joined fellow SuperLiga club Čukarički, signing a one-and-a-half year contract.

== International career ==
=== Youth ===
Stojković was a backup goalkeeper to Nikola Milojević in the Serbia and Montenegro under-21 squad that reached the final of the 2004 UEFA European Championship in Germany, but did not play one single minute in the tournament.

At the same time he broke through Red Star's starting XI, Stojković got more opportunities. In May 2006, he captained the under-21s during the 2006 European Championships in Portugal in the absence of suspended Danko Lazović, helping the national team reach the semi-finals.

=== Senior ===
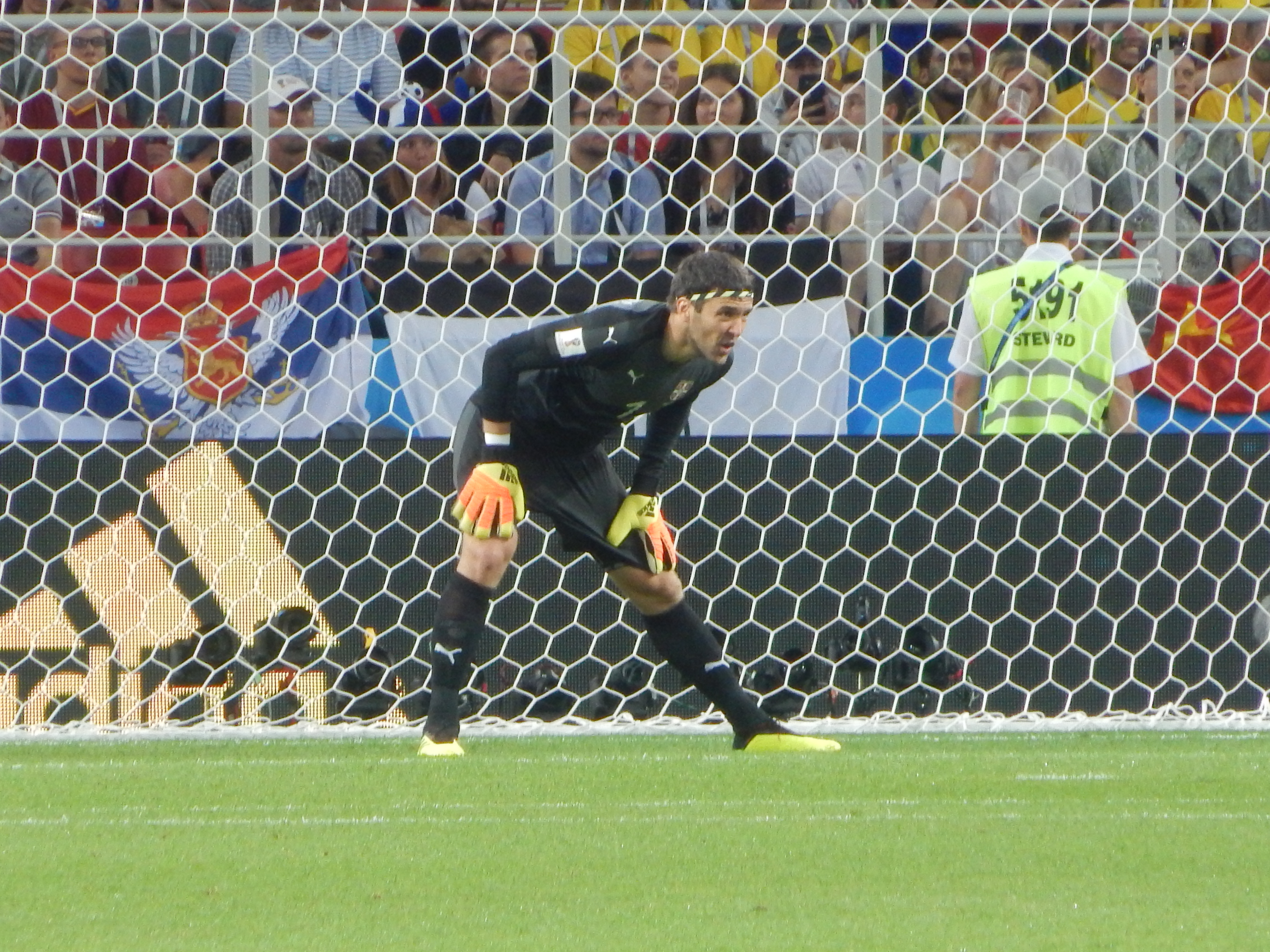
Stojković with Serbia at the 2018 World Cup

Uncapped, Stojković was named as member of the Serbia and Montenegro senior squad for the 2006 FIFA World Cup, and served as backup again, now to Dragoslav Jevrić. After the arrival of Javier Clemente as head coach following the competition, he became first-choice for the newly independent Serbia, making his debut against the Czech Republic on 16 August 2006.

Stojković played well overall during the UEFA Euro 2008 qualifying campaign, notably performing in a 1–1 draw versus Portugal with a string of spectacular saves. Clemente was replaced by Miroslav Đukić following the country's failure to qualify for the finals, but the player continued to start regularly.

In July 2008, Stojković was chosen as one of three overage players to the Serbia Olympic team for the Olympic tournament in Beijing. He was named captain and featured in all three group stage matches although Serbia failed to advance. In the third match against Argentina, Stojković saved two penalties taken by Ángel Di María.

Stojković continued to feature regularly for the national team under new boss Radomir Antić, even though he was completely ostracized at Sporting. After appearing in most of the 2010 World Cup qualifiers, he was also selected in Serbia's squad for the 2010 FIFA World Cup in South Africa. There he played all three group stage matches, and helped Serbia win 1–0 win against Germany, saving Lukas Podolski's penalty.

On 29 July 2010, in a vague statement to the Serbian sports daily Sportski žurnal, Stojković intimated a possibility of "temporarily stepping away from the national team" if he did not manage to find a club where he would get regular playing time by the time the Euro 2012 qualification process started. Antić did not call him up for the home friendly with Greece, as well as the first two competitive games against Faroe Islands and Slovenia.

However, after the manager was fired after the draw with Slovenia, Stojković was selected again by new coach Vladimir Petrović, for the next qualifier against Estonia on 8 October 2010. This was the first national team home match for the player following his move to Partizan, and he received a fair amount of verbal abuse from the Red Star fans in the crowd, which affected his performance as he let in a long-range goal to help the visitors tie the score at 1–1; later, with the hosts trailing 2–1, he made another mistake that led to a goal after miscommunication with centre back Aleksandar Luković, leading to a back pass that ended up in the Serbian goal.

Only four days later, before the start of the qualifying match against Italy in Genoa, Stojković was assaulted by a group of Red Star fans who broke into the Serbian team bus. He returned to the national team setup more than a year after the incident, being called for two friendlies in November 2011.

On 11 October 2014, with Serbia losing 0–1 away to Armenia in a Euro 2016 qualifier, Stojković saved a late penalty from Marcos Pizzelli, after which Zoran Tošić scored the final equaliser.

In June 2018, he was selected for the 2018 World Cup, playing all three group stage matches.

== Personal life ==
In June 2009, Stojković married his model girlfriend Bojana (née Rajić) with whom he has a son. The couple divorced in 2014.

Stojković's older brother, Vladan, was also a footballer and a goalkeeper. He spent most of his career in Portugal with Leça FC (1994–2000), settling in the country with his Portuguese wife after retiring and fathering Vladimir; the latter played youth football with Sporting whilst his uncle represented the club, and also appeared for Portugal at youth level.

== Career statistics ==
=== Club ===
As of 27 May 2024

Appearances and goals by club, season and competition
Club	Season	League			National cup (Note: Includes Serbian Cup, Taça de Portugal, FA Cup, Israel State Cup, King Cup)		League cup (Note: Includes Coupe de la Ligue, Taça da Liga, Football League Cup, Toto Cup)		Continental		Other		Total	
Club	Season	Division	Apps	Goals	Apps	Goals	Apps	Goals	Apps	Goals	Apps	Goals	Apps	Goals
Red Star Belgrade	2001–02	First League of FR Yugoslavia	1	0	0	0	—		0	0	—		1	0
Red Star Belgrade	2002–03	First League of FR Yugoslavia	1	0	0	0	—		0	0	—		1	0
Red Star Belgrade	Total		2	0	0	0	—		0	0	—		2	0
Leotar (loan)	2003–04	Bosnian Premier League	4	0	0	0	—		4 (Note: Appearances in UEFA Champions League)	0	—		8	0
Zemun	2003–04	First League of Serbia and Montenegro	6	0	0	0	—		—		—		6	0
Zemun	2004–05	First League of Serbia and Montenegro	28	0			—		—		—		28	0
Zemun	Total		34	0			—		—		—		34	0
Red Star Belgrade	2005–06	First League of Serbia and Montenegro	21	0	0	0	—		6 (Note: Appearances in UEFA Cup)	0	—		27	0
Nantes	2006–07	Ligue 1	10	0	0	0	1	0	—		—		11	0
Vitesse (loan)	2006–07	Eredivisie	8	0	0	0	—		—		6 (Note: Appearances in Eredivisie play-offs)	0	14	0
Sporting CP	2007–08	Primeira Liga	9	0	1	0	2	0	2	0	1 (Note: Appearance in Supertaça Cândido de Oliveira)	0	15	0
Getafe (loan)	2008–09	La Liga	5	0	0	0	—		—		—		5	0
Wigan Athletic (loan)	2009–10	Premier League	4	0	2	0	0	0	—		—		6	0
Partizan (loan)	2010–11	Serbian SuperLiga	26	0	4	0	—		6	0	—		36	0
Partizan	2011–12	Serbian SuperLiga	25	0	3	0	—		4 (Note: Appearances in UEFA Europa League)	0	—		32	0
Partizan	2012–13	Serbian SuperLiga	21	1	0	0	—		7	0	—		28	1
Partizan	2013–14	Serbian SuperLiga	14	0	3	0	—		2	0	—		19	0
Partizan	Total		86	1	10	0	—		19	0	—		115	1
Ergotelis	2013–14	Super League Greece	11	0	0	0	—		—		—		11	0
Maccabi Haifa	2014–15	Israeli Premier League	35	0	2	0	4	0	—		—		41	0
Maccabi Haifa	2015–16	Israeli Premier League	31	0	4	0	2	0	—		—		37	0
Maccabi Haifa	Total		66	0	6	0	6	0	—		—		78	0
Nottingham Forest	2016–17	Championship	20	0	0	0	1	0	—		—		21	0
Partizan	2017–18	Serbian SuperLiga	23	0	2	0	—		10	0	—		35	0
Partizan	2018–19	Serbian SuperLiga	30	0	5	0	—		7	0	—		42	0
Partizan	2019–20	Serbian SuperLiga	25	0	3	0	—		12	0	—		40	0
Partizan	2020–21	Serbian SuperLiga	15	0	3	0	—		3	0	—		21	0
Partizan	2021–22	Serbian SuperLiga	1	0	0	0	—		1	0	—		2	0
Partizan	Total		94	0	13	0	—		33	0	—		140	0
Al-Fayha	2021–22	Saudi Pro League	29	0	4	0	—		—		—		33	0
Al-Fayha	2022–23	Saudi Pro League	27	0	1	0	—		—		2 (Note: Appearances in Saudi Super Cup)	0	30	0
Al-Fayha	2023–24	Saudi Pro League	30	0	1	0	—		2 (Note: Appearances in AFC Champions League)	0	—		33	0
Al-Fayha	Total		86	0	5	0	—		2	0	2	0	95	0
Radnički 1923	2025–26	Serbian SuperLiga	6	0	1	0	—		2 (Note: Appearances in UEFA Conference League)	0	—		9	0
Career total			466	1	38	0	10	0	68	0	9	0	591	1

=== International ===
Appearances and goals by national team and year
National team	Year	Apps	Goals
Serbia	2006	6	0
Serbia	2007	8	0
Serbia	2008	7	0
Serbia	2009	8	0
Serbia	2010	8	0
Serbia	2011	1	0
Serbia	2012	4	0
Serbia	2013	8	0
Serbia	2014	9	0
Serbia	2015	6	0
Serbia	2016	6	0
Serbia	2017	7	0
Serbia	2018	6	0
Total		84	0

== Honours ==
Red Star Belgrade

- Serbia and Montenegro SuperLiga: 2005–06
- FR Yugoslavia Cup: 2001–02

Sporting CP

- Taça de Portugal: 2007–08
- Supertaça Cândido de Oliveira: 2007

Partizan

- Serbian SuperLiga: 2010–11, 2011–12, 2012–13
- Serbian Cup: 2010–11, 2017–18, 2018–19

Maccabi Haifa

- Israel State Cup: 2015–16

Al-Fayha

- King's Cup: 2021–22

Serbia and Montenegro U21

- UEFA European Under-21 Championship runner-up: 2004

Individual

- Serbian Player of the Year: 2017
- Serbian SuperLiga Team of the Season: 2012–13, 2017–18
- Partizan Player of the Year: 2013
- Serbian SuperLiga Player of the Week: 2025–26 (Round 3),
