= Bandar Nasser =

Saudi Arabian footballer (born 1990)

Personal information
- Full name: Bandar Nasser Al-Mutairi
- Date of birth: 14 March 1990 (age 36)
- Place of birth: Hafar al-Batin
- Height: 1.68 m (5 ft 6 in)
- Position: Left-back

Youth career
- Al-Batin

Senior career*
Years	Team	Apps	(Gls)
2011–2019	Al-Batin		
2019–2023	Al-Fayha	82	(0)
2023–2026	Al-Khaleej	34	(0)

International career^{‡}
2019–	Saudi Arabia	1	(0)
- * Club domestic league appearances and goals ‡ National team caps and goals as of 25 March 2019

Bandar Nasser Al-Mutairi (Arabic: بندر ناصر المطيري; born 14 March 1990) is a Saudi professional footballer who plays as a left back.

== Career ==
On 7 June 2023, Bandar Nasser joined Al-Khaleej on a two-year contract.

== International ==
He made his debut for the Saudi Arabia national football team on 25 March 2019 in a friendly against Equatorial Guinea, as a 37th-minute substitute for Abdullah Al-Shamekh. To-date that has been his only appearance for the national team.

== Honours ==
Al-Batin

- First Division League runners-up: 2015–16

Al-Fayha

- King Cup: 2021–22
