= Abdullah Al-Shamekh =

Saudi Arabian footballer

Personal information
- Full name: Abdullah Abdulkarim Al-Shamekh
- Date of birth: May 28, 1993 (age 33)
- Place of birth: Riyadh, Saudi Arabia
- Height: 1.78 m (5 ft 10 in)
- Position: Left-back

Youth career
- –2013: Al-Hilal

Senior career*
Years	Team	Apps	(Gls)
2013–2017	Al-Hilal	9	(0)
2016	→ Al-Raed (loan)	14	(0)
2016–2017	→ Al Wehda (loan)	23	(0)
2017–2019	Al-Raed	49	(3)
2019–2022	Al-Shabab	35	(0)
2022–2023	Al-Fayha	13	(0)
2023–2024	Al-Qadsiah	14	(0)
Total		157	(3)

International career^{‡}
2014	Saudi Arabia U23	2	(0)
2019–	Saudi Arabia	2	(1)
- * Club domestic league appearances and goals as of 17:37, 30 May 2024 (UTC) ‡ National team caps and goals as of 25 March 2019

Abdullah Abdulkarim Al-Shamekh (Arabic: عبدالله عبدالكريم الشامخ, born 28 May 1993) is a retired Saudi Arabian football player who played as a left back.

== Career ==
=== International ===
He made his debut for the Saudi Arabia national football team on 21 March 2019 in a friendly against United Arab Emirates. He scored his first international goal 4 days later in a friendly against Equatorial Guinea.

== Career statistics ==
=== Club ===
As of match played 28 May 2024

Club	Season	League		King Cup		Asia		Other		Total	
Club	Season	Apps	Goals	Apps	Goals	Apps	Goals	Apps	Goals	Apps	Goals
Al-Hilal	2013–14	1	0	0	0	0	0	0	0	1	0
Al-Hilal	2014–15	8	0	1	0	2	0	2 (Note: Appearances in Crown Prince Cup)	0	13	0
Al-Hilal	2015–16	0	0	0	0	0	0	0	0	0	0
Al-Hilal	Total	9	0	1	0	2	0	2	0	14	0
Al-Raed (loan)	2015–16	14	0	1	0	—		2 (Note: Appearances in Relegation Play-offs)	0	17	0
Al-Wehda (loan)	2016–17	23	0	2	0	—		2	0	27	0
Al-Raed	2017–18	21	0	1	0	—		3 (Note: Two appearances in Relegation Play-offs and one appearance in Crown Prince Cup)	0	25	0
Al-Raed	2018–19	28	3	1	0	—		—		29	3
Al-Raed	Total	49	3	2	0	0	0	3	0	54	3
Al-Shabab	2019–20	22	0	0	0	—		3 (Note: Appearances in Arab Club Champions Cup)	0	25	0
Al-Shabab	2020–21	8	0	0	0	—		1	0	9	0
Al-Shabab	2021–22	5	0	2	0	5	0	—		12	0
Al-Shabab	Total	35	0	2	0	5	0	4	0	46	0
Al-Fayha	2022–23	13	0	2	0	—		2 (Note: Appearances in Saudi Super Cup)	0	17	0
Al-Qadsiah	2023–24	14	0	1	0	—		—		15	0
Career totals		157	3	11	0	7	0	15	0	190	3

=== International goals ===
Scores and results list Saudi Arabia's goal tally first.

No.	Date	Venue	Opponent	Score	Result	Competition
1.	25 March 2019	King Fahd International Stadium, Riyadh, Saudi Arabia	Equatorial Guinea	1–0	3–2	Friendly

== Honours ==
Al-Hilal

- King Cup: 2015

Al-Qadsiah

- First Division League: 2023–24
