= 2019–20 Abha Club season =

Abha
2019–20 season
- President: Ahmed Al-Hodithy
- Manager: Abderrazek Chebbi
- Stadium: Prince Sultan bin Abdul Aziz Stadium
- Pro League: 9th
- King Cup: Semi-finals
- Top goalscorer: League: Saad Bguir (11); All: Saad Bguir (12)
- Highest home attendance: 16,820 (vs. Al-Hilal, 31 January 2020)
- Lowest home attendance: 581 (vs. Al-Faisaly, 25 January 2020)
- Average home league attendance: 3,527
| Home colours | Away colours | Third colours |

The 2019–20 season was Abha's first season back in the Pro League after winning the MS League the previous season. This was their 3rd non-consecutive season in the Pro League and their 54th season in existence. The club participated in the Pro League and the King Cup.

The season ran from 1 July 2019 to September 2020.

== Players ==
=== Squad information ===
As of 11 February 2020

Note: Flags indicate national team as defined under FIFA eligibility rules; some limited exceptions apply. Players may hold more than one non-FIFA nationality.

| No. | Pos. | Nation | Player |
|---|---|---|---|
| 1 | GK | KSA | Mohammed Al-Hassawi |
| 3 | MF | KSA | Musab Habkor |
| 4 | DF | KSA | Khaled Al-Khathlan |
| 5 | MF | KSA | Ahmed Al-Najei |
| 6 | DF | KSA | Karam Barnawi |
| 7 | MF | KSA | Abdullah Al-Qahtani (on loan from Al-Faisaly) |
| 12 | GK | MAR | Abdelali Mhamdi |
| 14 | FW | KSA | Saleh Al Abbas (on loan from Al-Nassr) |
| 15 | MF | KSA | Ammar Al-Najjar |
| 17 | MF | KSA | Abdullah Qaisi |
| 18 | MF | TUN | Saad Bguir |
| 19 | DF | MAR | Amine Atouchi |
| 22 | FW | TUN | Firas Chaouat (on loan from CS Sfaxien) |

| No. | Pos. | Nation | Player |
|---|---|---|---|
| 25 | MF | ALG | Salim Boukhanchouche (on loan from ES Sahel) |
| 29 | MF | TUN | Karim Aouadhi (captain) |
| 31 | DF | KSA | Sari Amr |
| 32 | DF | KSA | Omar Al-Muziel (on loan from Al-Fayha) |
| 33 | GK | KSA | Mansor Joher |
| 45 | MF | KSA | Hassan Al-Qeed (on loan from Al-Shabab) |
| 50 | DF | KSA | Osama Aashor |
| 55 | MF | KSA | Abdulaziz Al-Jamaan |
| 70 | FW | JOR | Muath Afaneh |
| 77 | DF | KSA | Ahmed Al-Habib |
| 88 | DF | KSA | Nader Al-Sharari |
| 90 | MF | KSA | Jehad Al-Zowayed |
| 91 | DF | ALG | Mehdi Tahrat |

=== Out on loan ===
Note: Flags indicate national team as defined under FIFA eligibility rules; some limited exceptions apply. Players may hold more than one non-FIFA nationality.

| No. / Pos. / Nation / Player; 11 / MF / KSA / Abdullah Nasser (at Al-Nojoom until 30 June 2020) | No. / Pos. / Nation / Player; 24 / DF / KSA / Hazaa Assiri (at Ohod until 30 June 2020) |

== Transfers and loans ==
=== Transfers in ===
| Entry date | Position | No. | Player | From club | Fee | Ref. |
|---|---|---|---|---|---|---|
| 2 June 2019 | MF | 18 | (Tunisia) Saad Bguir | (Tunisia) ES Tunis | Free | |
| 8 June 2019 | MF | 42 | (Nigeria) Reuben Gabriel | (Saudi Arabia) Najran | Free | |
| 10 June 2019 | DF | 50 | (Saudi Arabia) Osama Aashor | (Saudi Arabia) Ohod | Free | |
| 16 June 2019 | DF | 89 | (Saudi Arabia) Fahad Al-Johani | (Saudi Arabia) Al-Tai | Free | |
| 20 June 2019 | GK | 12 | (Morocco) Abdelali Mhamdi | (Morocco) RS Berkane | Free | |
| 6 July 2019 | MF | 66 | (Saudi Arabia) Sultan Al-Sherif | (Saudi Arabia) Al-Washm | Free | |
| 9 July 2019 | DF | 4 | (Saudi Arabia) Khaled Al-Khathlan | (Saudi Arabia) Al-Qaisumah | Free | |
| 13 July 2019 | MF | 15 | (Saudi Arabia) Ammar Al-Najjar | (Saudi Arabia) Al-Ittihad | Free | |
| 20 July 2019 | DF | 77 | (Saudi Arabia) Ahmed Al-Habib | (Saudi Arabia) Al-Ettifaq | Free | |
| 27 July 2019 | MF | 29 | (Tunisia) Karim Aouadhi | (Tunisia) ES Sahel | Undisclosed | |
| 29 July 2019 | GK | 33 | (Saudi Arabia) Mansor Joher | (Saudi Arabia) Al-Shoulla | Free | |
| 30 July 2019 | DF | 91 | (Algeria) Mehdi Tahrat | (France) RC Lens | $1,650,000 | |
| 6 August 2019 | DF | 19 | (Morocco) Amine Atouchi | (United Arab Emirates) Al-Dhafra | Undisclosed | |
| 7 August 2019 | DF | 23 | (Saudi Arabia) Adnan Fallatah | (Saudi Arabia) Al-Qadsiah | Free | |
| 20 August 2019 | FW | 9 | (Madagascar) Faneva Andriatsima | (France) Clermont Foot | Free | |
| 11 January 2020 | FW | 70 | (Jordan) Muath Afaneh | (Saudi Arabia) Al-Orobah | Free | |
| 30 January 2020 | DF | 31 | (Saudi Arabia) Sari Amr | (Saudi Arabia) Al-Wehda | Free | |
| 31 January 2020 | MF | 55 | (Saudi Arabia) Abdulaziz Al-Jamaan | (Saudi Arabia) Al-Jabalain | Undisclosed | |
| 31 January 2020 | DF | 88 | (Saudi Arabia) Nader Al-Sharari | (Saudi Arabia) Al-Orobah | Undisclosed | |
| 1 February 2020 | MF | 90 | (Saudi Arabia) Jehad Al-Zowayed | (Saudi Arabia) Al-Bukayriyah | Undisclosed | |

=== Loans in ===
| Start date | End date | Position | No. | Player | From club | Fee | Ref. |
|---|---|---|---|---|---|---|---|
| 7 July 2019 | 2 September 2019 | GK | 1 | (Saudi Arabia) Saleh Al Ohaymid | (Saudi Arabia) Al-Nassr | None | |
| 23 August 2019 | End of season | FW | 14 | (Saudi Arabia) Saleh Al Abbas | (Saudi Arabia) Al-Nassr | None | |
| 2 January 2020 | End of season | MF | 11 | (Saudi Arabia) Abdullah Al-Qahtani | (Saudi Arabia) Al-Faisaly | None | |
| 28 January 2020 | End of season | DF | 32 | (Saudi Arabia) Omar Al-Muziel | (Saudi Arabia) Al-Fayha | None | |
| 28 January 2020 | End of season | MF | 45 | (Saudi Arabia) Hassan Al-Qeed | (Saudi Arabia) Al-Shabab | None | |
| 1 February 2020 | End of season | FW | 22 | (Tunisia) Firas Chaouat | (Tunisia) CS Sfaxien | None | |
| 2 February 2020 | End of season | MF | 25 | (Algeria) Salim Boukhanchouche | (Tunisia) ES Sahel | None | |

=== Transfers out ===
| Exit date | Position | No. | Player | To club | Fee | Ref. |
|---|---|---|---|---|---|---|
| 27 May 2019 | MF | 28 | (Tunisia) Houssem Tabboubi | (Saudi Arabia) Hetten | Free | |
| 7 June 2019 | DF | 15 | (Tunisia) Mohamed Houssem | (Saudi Arabia) Al-Kawkab | Free | |
| 7 June 2019 | DF | 21 | (Tunisia) Mohammed Khanfir | (Saudi Arabia) Al-Kawkab | Free | |
| 25 June 2019 | GK | 1 | (Morocco) Marouane Fakhr | (Saudi Arabia) Al-Ansar | Free | |
| 29 June 2019 | MF | 14 | (Saudi Arabia) Nawaf Al-Shwier | (Saudi Arabia) Al-Nahda | Free | |
| 4 July 2019 | MF | 18 | (Saudi Arabia) Abdullah Al-Enezi | (Saudi Arabia) Al-Nahda | Free | |
| 13 July 2019 | FW | 11 | (Saudi Arabia) Mohammed Rawaf | (Saudi Arabia) Al-Shoulla | Free | |
| 16 July 2019 | DF | 17 | (Saudi Arabia) Ahmed Al-Sulami | (Saudi Arabia) Jeddah | Free | |
| 23 July 2019 | DF | 16 | (Sudan) Mohamed Bukhari | (Saudi Arabia) Al-Jandal | Free | |
| 28 July 2019 | MF | 7 | (Saudi Arabia) Omar Al-Sohaymi | (Saudi Arabia) Al-Tai | Free | |
| 30 July 2019 | DF | 25 | (Saudi Arabia) Mansor Assiri | (Saudi Arabia) Najran | Free | |
| 6 August 2019 | FW | 9 | (Guinea) Ousmane Barry | (Saudi Arabia) Al-Bukayriyah | Free | |
| 24 December 2019 | MF | 10 | (Saudi Arabia) Khaled Al-Zylaeei | (Saudi Arabia) Al-Ain | Free | |
| 9 January 2020 | MF | 27 | (Egypt) Ahmed Mostafa | (Saudi Arabia) Al-Adalah | Free | |
| 15 January 2020 | DF | 89 | (Saudi Arabia) Fahad Al-Johani | (Saudi Arabia) Al-Tai | Free | |
| 22 January 2020 | MF | 66 | (Saudi Arabia) Sultan Al-Sherif | | Released | |
| 31 January 2020 | DF | 4 | (Saudi Arabia) Khaled Al-Khathlan | (Saudi Arabia) Al-Raed | Undisclosed | |
| 1 February 2020 | MF | 8 | (Saudi Arabia) Sumayhan Al-Nabit | (Saudi Arabia) Al-Taawoun | $533,000 | |
| 11 February 2020 | FW | 9 | (Madagascar) Faneva Andriatsima | (Saudi Arabia) Al-Fayha | Free | |
| 13 February 2020 | DF | 23 | (Saudi Arabia) Adnan Fallatah | | Released | |

=== Loans out ===
| Start date | End date | Position | No. | Player | To club | Fee | Ref. |
|---|---|---|---|---|---|---|---|
| 5 January 2020 | End of season | DF | 24 | (Saudi Arabia) Hazaa Assiri | (Saudi Arabia) Ohod | None | |
| 13 January 2020 | End of season | MF | 11 | (Saudi Arabia) Abdullah Nasser | (Saudi Arabia) Al-Nojoom | None | |

== Pre-season and friendlies ==
Win Draw Loss

| 29 July 2019 Friendly | CS Sfaxien (Tunisia) | 3–1 | (Saudi Arabia) Abha | Sfax, Tunisia |
| 18:00 CEST (UTC+2) | Chaouat; Hamdouni; Harzi | Report | Al-Johani 68' | Stadium: Stade Taïeb Mhiri |

| 3 August 2019 Friendly | ES Tunis (Tunisia) | 2–0 | (Saudi Arabia) Abha | Tunis, Tunisia |
| 18:30 CEST (UTC+2) | Bensaha 37'; Jouini 89' | Report | | Stadium: Stade El Menzah |

| 8 August 2019 Friendly | CS Chebba (Tunisia) | 1–2 | (Saudi Arabia) Abha | Tunis, Tunisia |
| 18:00 CEST (UTC+2) | 70' (pen.) | | Al-Habib 33'; Aouadhi 56' (pen.) | Stadium: El Mouradi Hotel Stadium |

== Competitions ==
=== Overview ===
| Competition | First match | Last match | Starting round | Final position | Record | | | | | | | |
| Competition | First match | Last match | Starting round | Final position | Pld | W | D | L | GF | GA | GD | Win % |
|---|---|---|---|---|---|---|---|---|---|---|---|---|
| Professional League | 23 August 2019 | 9 September 2020 | Matchday 1 | 9th | 30 | 11 | 5 | 14 | 41 | 52 | −11 | 36.67 |
| King Cup | 5 November 2019 | 27 October 2020 | Round of 64 | Semi-finals | 4 | 3 | 1 | 0 | 5 | 2 | +3 | 75.00 |
| Total | | | | | 34 | 14 | 6 | 14 | 46 | 54 | −8 | 41.18 |

Last updated: 27 October 2020
Source: Soccerway

=== Saudi Professional League ===
==== League table ====
| Pos | Team | Pld | W | D | L | GF | GA | GD | Pts |
|---|---|---|---|---|---|---|---|---|---|
| 7 | Al-Shabab | 30 | 12 | 7 | 11 | 38 | 37 | +1 | 43 |
| 8 | Al-Ettifaq | 30 | 13 | 3 | 14 | 46 | 38 | +8 | 42 |
| 9 | Abha | 30 | 11 | 5 | 14 | 41 | 52 | −11 | 38 |
| 10 | Damac | 30 | 9 | 8 | 13 | 37 | 52 | −15 | 35 (Note: Positions determined by head-to-head points: Damac: 9 pts; Al-Ittihad: 6 pts; Al-Taawoun: 3 pts.) |
| 11 | Al-Ittihad | 30 | 9 | 8 | 13 | 42 | 41 | +1 | 35 |

Updated to match(es) played on 9 September 2020. Source: spl.com
Rules for classification: 1) Points; 2) Head-to-head points; 3) Head-to-head goal difference; 4) Total goal difference; 5) Total goals scored; 6) Fair-play points (Note: Head-to-head record is used only after all the matches between the teams in question have been played).

==== Results summary ====
| Overall | | | | | | | | Home | | | | | | Away | | | | | |
| Pld | W | D | L | GF | GA | GD | Pts | W | D | L | GF | GA | GD | W | D | L | GF | GA | GD |
|---|---|---|---|---|---|---|---|---|---|---|---|---|---|---|---|---|---|---|---|
| 30 | 11 | 5 | 14 | 41 | 52 | −11 | 38 | 7 | 3 | 5 | 21 | 21 | 0 | 4 | 2 | 9 | 20 | 31 | −11 |

Last updated: 9 September 2020.
Source: Saudi Pro League

==== Result round by round ====
| Round | 1 | 2 | 3 | 4 | 5 | 6 | 7 | 8 | 9 | 10 | 11 | 12 | 13 | 14 | 15 | 16 | 17 | 18 | 19 | 20 | 21 | 22 | 23 | 24 | 25 | 26 | 27 | 28 | 29 | 30 |
|---|---|---|---|---|---|---|---|---|---|---|---|---|---|---|---|---|---|---|---|---|---|---|---|---|---|---|---|---|---|---|
| Ground | A | A | H | A | H | A | H | A | A | H | A | H | H | A | H | H | H | A | H | A | H | A | H | H | A | H | A | A | H | A |
| Result | L | W | D | L | W | L | D | W | L | W | W | W | W | L | L | L | L | L | D | L | W | W | W | L | L | L | D | D | W | L |
| Position | 13 | 9 | 10 | 11 | 7 | 11 | 9 | 8 | 10 | 9 | 7 | 7 | 4 | 7 | 8 | 9 | 9 | 9 | 10 | 11 | 10 | 9 | 8 | 9 | 9 | 9 | 9 | 9 | 9 | 9 |

Updated to match(es) played on 9 September 2020. Source: Saudi Pro League
A = Away; H = Home; W = Win; D = Draw; L = Loss

==== Matches ====
The Professional League schedule was announced on 21 July 2019.

| 23 August 2019 1 | Al-Hilal | 4–2 | Abha | Riyadh |
| 19:00 AST (UTC+3) | Gomis 39', 44'; Giovinco 63'; Hyun-soo (yellow card) 79'; Kharbin 85' | Report | Andriatsima 20'; Bguir 81' (pen.); Al-Habib (yellow card) 87' | Stadium: King Saud University Stadium; Attendance: 18,022; Referee: Dennis Higler (Netherlands) |

| 30 August 2019 2 | Al-Wehda | 1–2 | Abha | Mecca |
| 20:40 AST (UTC+3) | Darwish (yellow card) 30'; Botía (yellow card) 49', (goal) 65'; Goodwin (yellow card) 83' | Report | Tahrat 31'; Atouchi (yellow card) 88'; Al-Najjar 90' | Stadium: King Abdul Aziz Stadium; Attendance: 1,146; Referee: Jorge Sousa (Portugal) |

| 14 September 2019 3 | Abha | 1–1 | Al-Raed | Abha |
| 18:50 AST (UTC+3) | Atouchi 26'; Gabriel (yellow card) 53'; Bguir (yellow card) 67'; Al Abbas (yellow card) 74' | Report | Daoudi 22' (pen.), (yellow card) 62'; Palomeque (yellow card) 36' | Stadium: Prince Sultan bin Abdul Aziz Stadium; Attendance: 1,222; Referee: André Narciso (Portugal) |

| 20 September 2019 4 | Al-Adalah | 2–1 | Abha | Al-Hasa |
| 18:20 AST (UTC+3) | Cissé 4'; Andriamatsinoro 48', (yellow card) 84'; Al-Burayh (yellow card) 57'; Al-Radhi (yellow card) 86'; Al-Eisa (yellow card) 89' | Report | Al Abbas 30'; Atouchi (yellow card) 45+3'; Al-Habib (yellow card) 90+3' | Stadium: Prince Abdullah bin Jalawi Stadium; Attendance: 12,640; Referee: Damir Skomina (Slovenia) |

| 26 September 2019 5 | Abha | 1–0 | Al-Ettifaq | Abha |
| 18:45 AST (UTC+3) | Gabriel (yellow card) 72'; Atouchi 90+4' | Report | Al Khairi (yellow card) 62'; Mahnashi (yellow card) 67' | Stadium: Prince Sultan bin Abdul Aziz Stadium; Attendance: 8,400; Referee: Kevin Blom (Netherlands) |

| 5 October 2019 6 | Al-Taawoun | 1–0 | Abha | Buraidah |
| 20:10 AST (UTC+3) | Al-Olayan (yellow card) 86'; Sandro Manoel 90+4'; Al-Daajani (yellow card) 90+4' | Report | Tahrat (yellow card) 23'; Al-Nabit (yellow card) 71'; Barnawi (yellow card) 90+2' (yellow-red card) 90+7' | Stadium: King Abdullah Sports City Stadium; Attendance: 2,001; Referee: Matej Jug (Slovenia) |

| 20 October 2019 7 | Abha | 1–1 | Al-Fayha | Abha |
| 18:25 AST (UTC+3) | Al Abbas 10' | Report | Neto (yellow card) 53'; Fernández 58' | Stadium: Prince Sultan bin Abdul Aziz Stadium; Attendance: 1,529; Referee: Matthew Conger (New Zealand) |

| 27 October 2019 8 | Al-Ittihad | 1–2 | Abha | Jeddah |
| 18:25 AST (UTC+3) | El Ahmadi (yellow card) 35'; Romarinho 60' (pen.) | Report | Aouadhi 22', (yellow card) 45+2'; Gabriel (yellow card) 58', (goal) 73' | Stadium: King Abdullah Sports City; Attendance: 7,324; Referee: Kim Jong-hyeok (South Korea) |

| 2 November 2019 9 | Al-Nassr | 4–0 | Abha | Riyadh |
| 19:50 AST (UTC+3) | Hamdallah 8', 45+1' (pen.); Al-Shehri 26'; Amrabat 58' | Report | Aashor (yellow card) 28'; Qaisi (yellow card) 41'; Al-Khathlan (yellow card) 44'; Atouchi (yellow card) 61' | Stadium: Prince Faisal bin Fahd Stadium; Attendance: 15,632; Referee: Viktor Kassai (Hungary) |

| 22 November 2019 10 | Abha | 3–1 | Al-Fateh | Abha |
| 15:30 AST (UTC+3) | Bguir 9'; Al-Nabit 18'; Barnawi (yellow card) 20'; Al-Najjar (yellow card) 77'; Al Abbas 86' | Report | Al-Fuhaid (yellow card) 4'; Aguirregaray (red card) 33'; Buhimed 49'; Majrashi (yellow card) 72'; Boushal (yellow card) 78' | Stadium: Prince Sultan bin Abdul Aziz Stadium; Attendance: 855; Referee: Fedayi San (Switzerland) |

| 12 December 2019 11 | Al-Hazem | 2–3 | Abha | Ar Rass |
| 15:20 AST (UTC+3) | Strandberg 6'; Fettouhi 71' (pen.); Al-Nashi (yellow card) 90' | Report | Alemão 29' (o.g.); Andriatsima 38'; Aouadhi 52'; Al-Nabit (yellow card) 68' | Stadium: Al-Hazem Club Stadium; Attendance: 4,431; Referee: Svein Oddvar Moen (Norway) |

| 19 December 2019 12 | Abha | 2–0 | Al-Shabab | Abha |
| 15:40 AST (UTC+3) | Barnawi (yellow card) 15'; Bguir 45+1', (yellow card) 45+4'; Andriatsima (yellow card) 62', (goal) 90+5'; Aouadhi (yellow card) 78' | Report | Sebá (yellow card) 17' (yellow-red card) 69'; Asprilla (yellow card) 39'; Al-Ammar (yellow card) 56'; Al-Khaibri (red card) 57' | Stadium: Prince Sultan bin Abdul Aziz Stadium; Attendance: 1,218; Referee: Pavel Královec (Czech Republic) |

| 28 December 2019 13 | Abha | 3–2 | Damac | Abha |
| 15:40 AST (UTC+3) | Al-Nabit (yellow card) 33'; Bguir 43' (pen.), 70'; Sharahili 45+3' (o.g.) | Report | Al-Shahrani (yellow card) 52'; Abousaban 66'; Al-Jizani (yellow card) 77'; Abo Shararah 90+4' | Stadium: Prince Sultan bin Abdul Aziz Stadium; Attendance: 1,375; Referee: Ivan Bebek (Croatia) |

| 13 January 2020 14 | Al-Ahli | 3–1 | Abha | Jeddah |
| 20:05 AST (UTC+3) | Djaniny 20'; Al Somah 35' (pen.), 83'; Souza (yellow card) 56' | Report | Andriatsima 26'; Al-Nabit (yellow card) 31'; Tahrat (yellow card) 34' | Stadium: King Abdullah Sports City; Attendance: 12,055; Referee: Sultan Al-Harbi |

| 25 January 2020 15 | Abha | 0–1 | Al-Faisaly | Abha |
| 15:55 AST (UTC+3) | Barnawi (yellow card) 68' (yellow-red card) 87' | Report | Silva 56'; Qassem (yellow card) 78' | Stadium: Prince Sultan bin Abdul Aziz Stadium; Attendance: 581; Referee: Tamás Bognár (Hungary) |

| 31 January 2020 16 | Abha | 1–2 | Al-Hilal | Abha |
| 16:00 AST (UTC+3) | Aouadhi (yellow card) 41'; Andriatsima 88', (yellow card) 89'; Bguir (yellow card) 90+3' | Report | Carrillo 9'; Gomis 13'; Otayf (yellow card) 84' | Stadium: Prince Sultan bin Abdul Aziz Stadium; Attendance: 16,820; Referee: Igor Pajač (Croatia) |

| 7 February 2020 17 | Abha | 1–4 | Al-Wehda | Abha |
| 16:00 AST (UTC+3) | Al-Jadaani 44' (o.g.); Aouadhi (yellow card) 59'; Atouchi (yellow card) 87' | Report | Goodwin 14', 46'; Niakaté 25', 60' | Stadium: Prince Sultan bin Abdul Aziz Stadium; Attendance: 1,297; Referee: António Nobre (Portugal) |

| 15 February 2020 18 | Al-Raed | 2–1 | Abha | Buraidah |
| 15:55 AST (UTC+3) | Al-Hussain 14'; Pérez 88' | Report | Al-Habib (yellow card) 33'; Boukhenchouche (yellow card) 68'; Barnawi (yellow card) 70'; Chaouat 71'; Afana (yellow card) 75'; Al-Najjar (yellow card) 82' | Stadium: King Abdullah Sports City Stadium; Attendance: 2,545; Referee: Mattias Gestranius (Finland) |

| 21 February 2020 19 | Abha | 2–2 | Al-Adalah | Abha |
| 16:10 AST (UTC+3) | Al-Najjar 7'; Bguir 28'; Boukhenchouche (yellow card) 48' | Report | Traoré 13'; Cissé 48'; Gentsoglou (yellow card) 90+1' | Stadium: Prince Sultan bin Abdul Aziz Stadium; Attendance: 1,972; Referee: Khaled Al-Teris |

| 29 February 2020 20 | Al-Ettifaq | 4–1 | Abha | Dammam |
| 18:20 AST (UTC+3) | Azaro 2', 5'; Al-Selouli 19'; Al-Kwikbi 44' (pen.) | Report | Aouadhi (yellow card) 43'; Bguir 51'; Al-Najei (yellow card) 75'; Aashor (yellow card) 81' | Stadium: Prince Mohamed bin Fahd Stadium; Attendance: 4,909; Referee: Andreas Ekberg (Sweden) |

| 7 March 2020 21 | Abha | 2–1 | Al-Taawoun | Abha |
| 16:15 AST (UTC+3) | Al Abbas 2'; Al-Qeed (yellow card) 42'; Al-Habib (yellow card) 75'; Atouchi 79', (yellow card) 90+4' | Report | Al-Rashidi (yellow card) 66'; Sufyani 86' | Stadium: Prince Sultan bin Abdul Aziz Stadium; Attendance: 0 (Note: Matches from 7 March and onwards will be played behind closed doors due to concerns over the coronavirus outbreak.); Referee: Tamás Bognár (Hungary) |

| 11 March 2020 22 | Al-Fayha | 0–2 | Abha | Al Majma'ah |
| 18:45 AST (UTC+3) | Villanueva (yellow card) 62'; Nasser (yellow card) 90+5' | Report | Bguir 29'; Atouchi (yellow card) 63'; Al-Qahtani 80' | Stadium: Al Majma'ah Sports City; Attendance: 0 Referee: Mohammed Al-Hoaish |

| 4 August 2020 23 | Abha | 2–1 | Al-Ittihad | Abha |
| 19:15 AST (UTC+3) | Al-Khathlan (yellow card) 42'; Aouadhi (yellow card) 45+2'; Tahrat 49'; Al-Najjar 85' (pen.) | Report | Romarinho 20'; Al-Sumairi (yellow card) 56'; El Ahmadi (yellow card) 84' | Stadium: Prince Sultan bin Abdul Aziz Stadium; Attendance: 0 Referee: Majed Al-Shamrani |

| 10 August 2020 24 | Abha | 0–2 | Al-Nassr | Abha |
| 19:15 AST (UTC+3) | Tahrat (yellow card) 35'; Al-Khathlan (yellow card) 41'; Barnawi (red card) 57' | Report | Hamdallah 58' (pen.); Musa 62' | Stadium: Prince Sultan bin Abdul Aziz Stadium; Attendance: 0 Referee: Nikola Dabanović (Montenegro) |

| 14 August 2020 25 | Al-Fateh | 2–1 | Abha | Al-Hasa |
| 18:55 AST (UTC+3) | Kadrii 20'; Naji 37'; Al-Hassan (yellow card) 42'; Boushal (yellow card) 51'; Bendebka (yellow card) 60'; Saâdane (red card) 70' | Report | Al-Qeed 23'; Al-Muziel (yellow card) 36'; Al-Sharari (yellow card) 45+2'; Al Abbas (yellow card) 84' | Stadium: Prince Abdullah bin Jalawi Stadium; Attendance: 0 Referee: Kristo Tohver (Estonia) |

| 19 August 2020 26 | Abha | 0–2 | Al-Hazem | Abha |
| 19:10 AST (UTC+3) | Aouadhi (yellow card) 42'; Al-Sharari (yellow card) 45+4'; Amr (yellow card) 57'; Al-Qeed (yellow card) 65'; Al-Najjar (yellow card) 89' (yellow-red card) 90+6' | Report | Strandberg 23'; Alemão (yellow card) 27', (goal) 45+5' (pen.); Asselah (yellow card) 80' | Stadium: Prince Sultan bin Abdul Aziz Stadium; Attendance: 0 Referee: Gediminas Mažeika (Lithuania) |

| 24 August 2020 27 | Al-Shabab | 1–1 | Abha | Riyadh |
| 19:00 AST (UTC+3) | Asprilla 12'; Salem (yellow card) 39'; Sebá (yellow card) 63'; Al-Khaibri (red card) 90' | Report | Tahrat (yellow card) 6'; Al-Qahtani (yellow card) 56'; Bguir 67' (pen.) | Stadium: Prince Khaled bin Sultan Stadium; Attendance: 0 Referee: Turki Al-Khudhayr |

| 29 August 2020 28 | Damac | 2–2 | Abha | Abha |
| 19:00 AST (UTC+3) | Zelaya 8'; Saidani (yellow card) 19'; Vittor 45+2'; Al-Najei (yellow card) 50' (yellow-red card) 59'; Al-Hujaili (yellow card) 67'; Ayadi (yellow card) 71' | Report | Al-Qeed (yellow card) 11', (goal) 15'; Aouadhi (yellow card) 68', (goal) 89'; Barnawi (yellow card) 82' | Stadium: Prince Sultan bin Abdul Aziz Stadium; Attendance: 0 Referee: Andrés Cunha (Uruguay) |

| 4 September 2020 29 | Abha | 2–1 | Al-Ahli | Abha |
| 20:35 AST (UTC+3) | Bguir 32' (pen.), 90+3'; Aashor (yellow card) 45+4'; Atouchi (yellow card) 80'; Al-Najei (yellow card) 88' | Report | Hassoun 80' | Stadium: Prince Sultan bin Abdul Aziz Stadium; Attendance: 0 Referee: Khaled Al-Teris |

| 9 September 2020 30 | Al-Faisaly | 2–1 | Abha | Al Majma'ah |
| 20:35 AST (UTC+3) | William 23'; Silva 52'; Hyland (yellow card) 84' | Report | Aouadhi 70' (pen.) | Stadium: Al Majma'ah Sports City; Attendance: 0 Referee: Mohammed Al-Hoaish |

=== King Cup ===
| 5 November 2019 Round of 64 | Al-Qaisumah | 1–2 | Abha | Hafar al-Batin |
| 15:35 AST (UTC+3) | Al-Enezi (yellow card) 49'; Bakaki 78' | Report | Al Abbas 9'; Al-Habib (yellow card) 27'; Andriatsima 32'; Al-Nabit (yellow card) 90+2' | Stadium: Al-Batin Club Stadium; Referee: Abdullah Al-Nuhait |

| 7 December 2019 Round of 32 | Abha | 1–0 | Al-Arabi | Abha |
| 15:30 AST (UTC+3) | Andriatsima 79' | Report | | Stadium: Prince Sultan bin Abdul Aziz Stadium; Referee: Khaled Salwi |

| 23 December 2019 Round of 16 | Abha | 1–0 | Al-Taawoun | Abha |
| 15:40 AST (UTC+3) | Al-Najei 41', (yellow card) 41'; Al-Nabit (yellow card) 83' | Report | Amissi (yellow card) 90+4' | Stadium: Prince Sultan bin Abdul Aziz Stadium; Referee: Artur Soares Dias (Portugal) |

| 18 January 2020 Quarter-finals | Abha | 1–1 (a.e.t.) (5–3 p) | Al-Fateh | Abha |
| 15:55 AST (UTC+3) | Barnawi (yellow card) 21'; Bguir 28' (pen.); Fallatah (yellow card) 90+2' | Report | Al-Saeed (yellow card) 25'; Saâdane 50' | Stadium: Prince Sultan bin Abdul Aziz Stadium; Referee: Andris Treimanis (Latvia) |
| | Penalties |
| | Andriatsima (penalty scored); Al-Najjar (penalty scored); Aouadhi (penalty scored); Bguir (penalty scored); Qaisi (penalty scored) | | (penalty scored) Saâdane; (penalty scored) Janota; (penalty missed) Al-Nakhli; (penalty scored) Boushal |

| 27 October 2020 Semi-finals | Al-Hilal | 2–0 | Abha | Riyadh |
| (UTC+3) | Al-Dawsari 28', (yellow card) 66'; Cuéllar (yellow card) 38'; Giovinco 45+1' | Report | | Stadium: King Saud University Stadium; Attendance: 0 Referee: Eber Aquino (Paraguay) |

== Statistics ==
=== Appearances ===
Last updated on 9 September 2020.

| No. | Pos | Nat | Player | Total | | Pro League | | King Cup | |
| No. | Pos | Nat | Player | Apps | Goals | Apps | Goals | Apps | Goals |
Goalkeepers
| 1 | GK | (Saudi Arabia) KSA | Mohammed Al-Hassawi | 0 | 0 | 0 | 0 | 0 | 0 |
| 12 | GK | (Morocco) MAR | Abdelali Mhamdi | 33 | 0 | 30 | 0 | 3 | 0 |
| 33 | GK | (Saudi Arabia) KSA | Mansor Joher | 1 | 0 | 0 | 0 | 1 | 0 |
Defenders
| 4 | DF | (Saudi Arabia) KSA | Khaled Al-Khathlan | 29 | 0 | 26 | 0 | 3 | 0 |
| 6 | DF | (Saudi Arabia) KSA | Karam Barnawi | 25 | 0 | 21+1 | 0 | 3 | 0 |
| 19 | DF | (Morocco) MAR | Amine Atouchi | 32 | 3 | 29 | 3 | 3 | 0 |
| 31 | DF | (Saudi Arabia) KSA | Sari Amr | 5 | 0 | 4+1 | 0 | 0 | 0 |
| 32 | DF | (Saudi Arabia) KSA | Omar Al-Muziel | 4 | 0 | 2+2 | 0 | 0 | 0 |
| 50 | DF | (Saudi Arabia) KSA | Osama Aashor | 11 | 0 | 8+2 | 0 | 1 | 0 |
| 77 | DF | (Saudi Arabia) KSA | Ahmed Al-Habib | 9 | 0 | 6+1 | 0 | 2 | 0 |
| 88 | DF | (Saudi Arabia) KSA | Nader Al-Sharari | 7 | 0 | 7 | 0 | 0 | 0 |
| 91 | DF | (Algeria) ALG | Mehdi Tahrat | 29 | 2 | 25 | 2 | 3+1 | 0 |
Midfielders
| 3 | MF | (Saudi Arabia) KSA | Musab Habkor | 3 | 0 | 0+2 | 0 | 0+1 | 0 |
| 5 | MF | (Saudi Arabia) KSA | Ahmed Al-Najei | 20 | 1 | 9+8 | 0 | 3 | 1 |
| 7 | MF | (Saudi Arabia) KSA | Abdullah Al-Qahtani | 13 | 1 | 5+7 | 1 | 1 | 0 |
| 15 | MF | (Saudi Arabia) KSA | Ammar Al-Najjar | 28 | 3 | 18+7 | 3 | 2+1 | 0 |
| 16 | MF | (Saudi Arabia) KSA | Tarek Al-Shahrani | 0 | 0 | 0 | 0 | 0 | 0 |
| 17 | MF | (Saudi Arabia) KSA | Abdullah Qaisi | 11 | 0 | 4+5 | 0 | 1+1 | 0 |
| 18 | MF | (Tunisia) TUN | Saad Bguir | 31 | 12 | 29 | 11 | 2 | 1 |
| 25 | MF | (Algeria) ALG | Salim Boukhanchouche | 6 | 0 | 3+3 | 0 | 0 | 0 |
| 29 | MF | (Tunisia) TUN | Karim Aouadhi | 31 | 4 | 27 | 4 | 4 | 0 |
| 45 | MF | (Saudi Arabia) KSA | Hassan Al-Qeed | 11 | 2 | 10+1 | 2 | 0 | 0 |
| 55 | MF | (Saudi Arabia) KSA | Abdulaziz Al-Jamaan | 3 | 0 | 1+2 | 0 | 0 | 0 |
| 90 | MF | (Saudi Arabia) KSA | Jehad Al-Zowayed | 6 | 0 | 1+5 | 0 | 0 | 0 |
Forwards
| 14 | FW | (Saudi Arabia) KSA | Saleh Al Abbas | 26 | 5 | 13+10 | 4 | 2+1 | 1 |
| 22 | FW | (Tunisia) TUN | Firas Chaouat | 13 | 1 | 7+6 | 1 | 0 | 0 |
| 70 | FW | (Jordan) JOR | Muath Afaneh | 4 | 0 | 0+4 | 0 | 0 | 0 |
Players sent out on loan this season
| 11 | MF | (Saudi Arabia) KSA | Abdullah Nasser | 0 | 0 | 0 | 0 | 0 | 0 |
| 24 | DF | (Saudi Arabia) KSA | Hazaa Assiri | 0 | 0 | 0 | 0 | 0 | 0 |
Player who made an appearance this season but have left the club
| 8 | MF | (Saudi Arabia) KSA | Sumayhan Al-Nabit | 17 | 1 | 14 | 1 | 1+2 | 0 |
| 9 | FW | (Madagascar) MAD | Faneva Imà Andriatsima | 15 | 7 | 10+1 | 5 | 3+1 | 2 |
| 10 | MF | (Saudi Arabia) KSA | Khaled Al-Zylaeei | 5 | 0 | 2+2 | 0 | 1 | 0 |
| 23 | DF | (Saudi Arabia) KSA | Adnan Fallatah | 1 | 0 | 0 | 0 | 1 | 0 |
| 27 | MF | (Egypt) EGY | Ahmed Mostafa | 6 | 0 | 3+2 | 0 | 1 | 0 |
| 42 | MF | (Nigeria) NGR | Reuben Gabriel | 20 | 1 | 16 | 1 | 3+1 | 0 |
| 66 | MF | (Saudi Arabia) KSA | Sultan Al-Sherif | 0 | 0 | 0 | 0 | 0 | 0 |
| 89 | DF | (Saudi Arabia) KSA | Fahad Al-Johani | 0 | 0 | 0 | 0 | 0 | 0 |

=== Goalscorers ===
| Rank | No. | Pos | Nat | Name | Pro League | King Cup | Total |
|---|---|---|---|---|---|---|---|
| 1 | 18 | MF | (Tunisia) | Saad Bguir | 11 | 1 | 12 |
| 2 | 9 | FW | (Madagascar) | Faneva Imà Andriatsima | 5 | 2 | 7 |
| 3 | 14 | FW | (Saudi Arabia) | Saleh Al Abbas | 4 | 1 | 5 |
| 4 | 29 | MF | (Tunisia) | Karim Aouadhi | 4 | 0 | 4 |
| 5 | 15 | MF | (Saudi Arabia) | Ammar Al-Najjar | 3 | 0 | 3 |
| 5 | 19 | DF | (Morocco) | Amine Atouchi | 3 | 0 | 3 |
| 7 | 45 | MF | (Saudi Arabia) | Hassan Al-Qeed | 2 | 0 | 2 |
| 7 | 91 | DF | (Algeria) | Mehdi Tahrat | 2 | 0 | 2 |
| 9 | 5 | MF | (Saudi Arabia) | Ahmed Al-Najei | 0 | 1 | 1 |
| 9 | 7 | MF | (Saudi Arabia) | Abdullah Al-Qahtani | 1 | 0 | 1 |
| 9 | 8 | MF | (Saudi Arabia) | Sumayhan Al-Nabit | 1 | 0 | 1 |
| 9 | 22 | FW | (Tunisia) | Firas Chaouat | 1 | 0 | 1 |
| 9 | 42 | MF | (Nigeria) | Reuben Gabriel | 1 | 0 | 1 |
| Own goal | | | | | 3 | 0 | 3 |
| Total | | | | | 41 | 5 | 46 |

Last Updated: 9 September 2020

=== Clean sheets ===
| Rank | No. | Pos | Nat | Name | Pro League | King Cup | Total |
|---|---|---|---|---|---|---|---|
| 1 | 12 | GK | (Morocco) | Abdelali Mhamdi | 3 | 2 | 5 |
| Total | | | | | 3 | 2 | 5 |

Last Updated: 11 March 2020
