= 2019–20 Saudi Pro League =

Saudi Pro League
- Season: 2019–20
- Dates: 22 August 2019 – 9 September 2020
- Champions: Al-Hilal (16th title)
- Relegated: Al-Fayha; Al-Hazem; Al-Adalah
- Champions League: Al-Hilal; Al-Nassr; Al-Ahli
- Matches: 240
- Goals: 690 (2.88 per match)
- Top goalscorer: Abderrazak Hamdallah (29 goals)
- Best goalkeeper: Brad Jones (12 clean sheets)
- Biggest home win: Al-Hilal 7–0 Al-Adalah (30 December 2019)
- Biggest away win: Al-Hazem 0–6 Al-Ettifaq (15 September 2019)
- Highest scoring: Al-Adalah 3–5 Al-Fateh (18 October 2019)
- Longest winning run: Al-Hilal (6 matches)
- Longest unbeaten run: Al-Hilal (17 matches)
- Longest winless run: Al-Adalah (17 matches)
- Longest losing run: Damac (6 matches)
- Highest attendance: 43,783; Al-Ittihad 1–3 Al-Hilal (21 September 2019)
- Lowest attendance: 0 (7 March 2020 and onwards due to COVID-19 pandemic in Saudi Arabia)
- Total attendance: 1,399,104
- Average attendance: 8,479
- All statistics correct as of 9 September 2020.

The 2019–20 Saudi Pro League was the 45th edition of the top-tier Saudi football league, established in 1974, and the 12th edition since it was rebranded as the Saudi Pro League in 2008. The season started on 22 August 2019 and concluded on 9 September 2020.

Al-Nassr were the defending champions. The league was contested by the top 13 teams from the 2018–19 season as well as Abha, Damac, and Al-Adalah, who joined as the three promoted clubs from the 2018–19 Prince Mohammad bin Salman League. They replace Ohod, Al-Batin and Al-Qadsiah who were relegated to the 2019–20 Prince Mohammad bin Salman League.

On 7 March 2020, the Ministry of Sports announced that all matches would be played behind closed doors until further notice. On 14 March 2020, the Ministry suspended all sports competitions indefinitely due to the COVID-19 pandemic in Saudi Arabia. On 11 June 2020, the Ministry of Sports announced the resumption of sports activities with training starting on 21 June and games starting after 4 August 2020 and played behind closed doors. On 1 July 2020, the schedule for the remaining matches was released. It was announced that the league would resume on 4 August 2020 and end on 9 September 2020.

On 29 August 2020, Al-Hilal won the league for a record 16th time with two matches remaining, after defeating Al-Hazem 4–1. Al-Adalah were the first team to be relegated following a 1–1 home draw with Al-Raed on 29 August 2020. On 4 September 2020, Al-Hazem were relegated following a 1–0 defeat away to Al-Shabab. Al-Fayha were the third and final team to be relegated following a 1–0 defeat away to Al-Taawoun in the final matchday.

== Changes ==
On June 9, 2019, the Saudi FF announced that the number of foreign players was reduced from 8 players to 7 players. In addition, they announced that clubs could no longer sign players on amateurs contracts and that the squad size will be increased to 30 players. On 20 August 2019, the Saudi FF announced that relegation play-off between the 13th placed team of the Pro League and the 4th placed team of the MS League was cancelled.

== Teams ==
Locations of teams in the 2019–20 Saudi Professional League

Sixteen teams will compete in the league – the top twelve teams from the previous season, the play-off winner and the three teams promoted from the MS League.

Teams who were promoted to the Pro League

The first team to be promoted was Abha, following their 2–2 draw away to Al-Nojoom on 30 April 2019. Abha will play in the top flight of Saudi football after a ten-year absence. Despite losing to Al-Qaisumah, they were crowned champions on 11 May 2019 due to Damac's 1–1 draw with Al-Ain.

The second team to be promoted was Damac, in spite of their 1–0 defeat away to Al-Tai, on 5 May 2019. Damac will play in the top flight of Saudi football for the first time since 1982 when both the Pro League and First Division were merged into one league.

The third and final team to be promoted was Al-Adalah, who were promoted on the final matchday following their 2–0 win at home against Damac on 15 May 2019. Al-Adalah will play in the top flight of Saudi football for the first time in history.

Teams who were relegated to the MS League

The first team to be relegated was Ohod, ending a 2-year stay in the Pro League following a 3–1 home defeat to Al-Fayha on 12 April 2019.

The second team to be relegated was Al-Batin, ending a 3-year stay in the Pro League following a 1–0 home defeat to an already relegated Ohod side on 11 May 2019.

The third and final team to be relegated was Al-Qadsiah, who were relegated on the final matchday following a 2–2 home draw with Al-Hazem. Al-Qadsiah were relegated after 4 consecutive seasons in the Pro League.

=== Stadiums ===
Note: Table lists in alphabetical order.

Team	Location	Stadium	Capacity
Abha	Abha	Prince Sultan bin Abdul Aziz Stadium	20,000
Al-Adalah	Al-Hasa	Prince Abdullah bin Jalawi Stadium	26,000
Al-Ahli	Jeddah	King Abdullah Sports City	62,345
Al-Ettifaq	Dammam	Prince Mohamed bin Fahd Stadium	35,000
Al-Faisaly	Harmah	Al Majma'ah Sports City	7,000
Al-Fateh	Al-Hasa	Prince Abdullah bin Jalawi Stadium	26,000
Al-Fayha	Al Majma'ah	Al Majma'ah Sports City	7,000
Al-Hazem	Ar Rass	Al-Hazem Club Stadium	8,000
Al-Hilal	Riyadh	King Saud University Stadium	25,000
Al-Ittihad	Jeddah	King Abdullah Sports City	62,345
Al-Nassr	Riyadh	King Fahd International Stadium	62,685
Al-Raed	Buraidah	King Abdullah Sport City Stadium	25,000
Al-Shabab	Riyadh	King Fahd International Stadium	62,685
Al-Taawoun	Buraidah	King Abdullah Sport City Stadium	25,000
Al-Wehda	Mecca	King Abdul Aziz Stadium	38,000
Damac	Khamis Mushait	Prince Sultan bin Abdul Aziz Stadium	20,000

1: Al-Faisaly play their home games in Al Majma'ah.
2: Al-Nassr and Al-Shabab also use Prince Faisal bin Fahd Stadium (22,500 seats) as a home stadium.
3: Damac play their home games in Abha.

=== Personnel and kits ===
Team	Manager	Captain	Kit manufacturer	Shirt sponsor
Abha	(Tunisia) Abderrazek Chebbi	(Tunisia) Karim Aouadhi	Offside	Al Wefaq, Saudi German Hospital^{1}, Areekat Aldeera^{1}
Al-Adalah	(Italy) Giovanni Solinas	(Madagascar) Carolus Andria	Offside	Al-Ghadeer Group, Hussein Al-Ali Hospital, Al Wefaq^{1}
Al-Ahli	(Serbia) Vladan Milojević	(Saudi Arabia) Hussein Abdulghani	S Team	Saudia, MG Cars, Oud Milano^{1}, Boga Super Foods^{2}
Al-Ettifaq	(Saudi Arabia) Khaled Al-Atwi	(Algeria) Raïs M'Bolhi	Jako	Al Mattar, Dose Cafe, Kammelna^{1}, Innosoft^{2}, Eithar^{2}, Twareat Medical Center^{3}
Al-Faisaly	(Brazil) Péricles Chamusca	(Brazil) Igor Rossi	adidas	ALDREES, Gree Electric, Al Wefaq^{1}, Shmagh Albassam^{1}, Roco^{2}
Al-Fateh	(Belgium) Yannick Ferrera	(Saudi Arabia) Mohammed Al-Fuhaid	Offside	Kia Motors, Fuchsia Bakery, Al Kifah Holding^{1}, Almoosa Hospital^{1}
Al-Fayha	(Saudi Arabia) Yousef Al-Ghadeer	(Saudi Arabia) Sami Al-Khaibari	Skillano	The Fourth Triangle
Al-Hazem	(Brazil) André Gaspar	(Brazil) Alemão	S Team	Cabrito, RAKAA Holding^{1}, Alreef Alfarance^{2}
Al-Hilal	(Romania) Răzvan Lucescu	(Saudi Arabia) Salman Al-Faraj	S Team	EMAAR, Jahez, Tawuniya^{1}, Flyin.com^{2}, Sayyar^{2}
Al-Ittihad	(Brazil) Fábio Carille	(Morocco) Karim El Ahmadi	S Team	FAW Group, Ibrahim Al Qurashi^{1}, Al Wefaq^{2}
Al-Nassr	(Portugal) Rui Vitória	(Saudi Arabia) Omar Hawsawi	Victory	Etihad Airways, Nejree^{1}, Richy^{2}, Wssel^{2}, Naqi Water^{3}
Al-Raed	(Kosovo) Besnik Hasi	(Saudi Arabia) Hussain Al-Showaish	Erreà	Al Wefaq, My Pure Water^{1}
Al-Shabab	(Portugal) Pedro Caixinha	(Saudi Arabia) Mohammed Salem	Xtep	Eastgate, Walem, Daffah^{1}
Al-Taawoun	(Saudi Arabia) Abdullah Asiri	(Saudi Arabia) Talal Al-Absi	Offside	Al Maghrabi, Al Wefaq^{1}, Alnadeg^{1}, Desert One^{2}
Al-Wehda	(Saudi Arabia) Essa Al-Mehyani	(Saudi Arabia) Waleed Bakshween	Tattweer	Herfy, Lebs.com, Makkah Chamber of Commerce, Saudi Al Qaid Company^{2}, Ara Water^{3}, Erwaa^{3}
Damac	(Algeria) Noureddine Zekri	(Algeria) Farouk Chafaï	Skillano	Abu Zaid, Al Msakin Palace, Bin Thaliba^{1}, Zain Cupcake^{3}

- ^{1} On the back of the strip.
- ^{2} On the right sleeve of the strip.
- ^{3} On the shorts.

=== Managerial changes ===
Team	Outgoing manager	Manner of departure	Date of vacancy	Position in table	Incoming manager	Date of appointment
Al-Adalah	(Saudi Arabia) Redha Al-Janbe	End of caretaker spell	16 May 2019	Pre-season	(Tunisia) Skander Kasri	31 May 2019
Al-Ettifaq	(Portugal) Hélder	End of caretaker spell	17 May 2019	Pre-season	(Saudi Arabia) Khaled Al-Atwi	17 June 2019
Al-Wehda	(Argentina) Juan Brown	End of caretaker spell	17 May 2019	Pre-season	(Croatia) Mario Cvitanović	2 July 2019
Al-Fayha	(Algeria) Noureddine Zekri	End of contract	17 May 2019	Pre-season	(Portugal) Jorge Simão	8 June 2019
Al-Shabab	(Romania) Marius Șumudică	Mutual consent	19 May 2019	Pre-season	(Argentina) Jorge Almirón	24 June 2019
Al-Taawoun	(Portugal) Pedro Emanuel	Mutual consent	19 May 2019	Pre-season	(Portugal) Paulo Sérgio	21 May 2019
Al-Ahli	(Saudi Arabia) Yousef Anbar	End of caretaker spell	21 May 2019	Pre-season	(Croatia) Branko Ivanković	18 June 2019
Al-Hilal	(Brazil) Péricles Chamusca	End of contract	21 May 2019	Pre-season	(Romania) Răzvan Lucescu	30 Jun 2019
Al-Ahli	(Croatia) Branko Ivanković	Sacked	16 September 2019	9th	(Switzerland) Christian Gross	16 October 2019
Al-Wehda	(Croatia) Mario Cvitanović	Mutual consent	16 September 2019	12th	(Uruguay) José Daniel Carreño	16 September 2019
Damac	(Tunisia) Mohammed Kouki	Sacked	5 October 2019	15th	(Algeria) Noureddine Zekri	5 October 2019
Al-Fateh	(Tunisia) Fathi Al-Jabal	Mutual consent	14 October 2019	16th	(Belgium) Yannick Ferrera	14 October 2019
Al-Ittihad	(Chile) José Luis Sierra	Sacked	19 October 2019	8th	(Netherlands) Henk ten Cate	4 November 2019
Al-Adalah	(Tunisia) Skander Kasri	Mutual consent	4 November 2019	14th	(Tunisia) Nacif Beyaoui	5 November 2019
Al-Shabab	(Argentina) Jorge Almirón	Sacked	4 December 2019	7th	(Spain) Luis García	12 December 2019
Al-Taawoun	(Portugal) Paulo Sérgio	Mutual Consent	29 December 2019	6th	(Portugal) Vítor Campelos	15 January 2020
Al-Hazem	(Romania) Daniel Isăilă	Sacked	31 January 2020	13th	(Brazil) André	31 January 2020
Al-Ittihad	(Netherlands) Henk ten Cate	Sacked	11 February 2020	12th	(Brazil) Fábio Carille	17 February 2020
Al-Ahli	(Switzerland) Christian Gross	Sacked	17 February 2020	3rd	(Serbia) Vladan Milojević	28 February 2020
Al-Adalah	(Tunisia) Nacif Beyaoui	Resigned	13 June 2020	16th	(Italy) Giovanni Solinas	25 June 2020
Al-Shabab	(Spain) Luis García	End of contract	18 July 2020	8th	(Portugal) Pedro Caixinha	20 July 2020
Al-Wehda	(Uruguay) José Daniel Carreño	Mutual consent	19 August 2020	5th	(Saudi Arabia) Essa Al-Mehyani (caretaker)	19 August 2020
Al-Fayha	(Portugal) Jorge Simão	Sacked	27 August 2020	13th	(Saudi Arabia) Yousef Al-Ghadeer	27 August 2020
Al-Taawoun	(Portugal) Vítor Campelos	Sacked	30 August 2020	10th	(Saudi Arabia) Abdullah Asiri (caretaker)	6 September 2020

=== Foreign players ===
On June 9, 2019, the Saudi FF announced that the number of foreign players was reduced from 8 players to 7 players.

Players name in bold indicates the player is registered during the mid-season transfer window.

Club	Player 1	Player 2	Player 3	Player 4	Player 5	Player 6	Player 7	Former Players
Abha	(Algeria) **Salim Boukhanchouche**	(Algeria) Mehdi Tahrat	(Morocco) Amine Atouchi	(Morocco) Abdelali Mhamdi	(Tunisia) Karim Aouadhi	(Tunisia) Saad Bguir	(Tunisia) **Firas Chaouat**	(Madagascar) Faneva Imà Andriatsima (Nigeria) Reuben Gabriel
Al-Adalah	(Gabon) Medwin Biteghé	(Greece) **Savvas Gentsoglou**	(Madagascar) Carolus Andriamatsinoro	(Mali) **Adama Traoré**	(Senegal) Aliou Cissé	(Senegal) Sy Ass Mandaw		(Algeria) Abdelaziz Ali Guechi (Nigeria) John Ogu (Tunisia) Youssef Fouzai (Tunisia) Aymen Mathlouthi
Al-Ahli	(Algeria) Youcef Belaïli	(Bosnia and Herzegovina) Elvis Sarić	(Brazil) Lucas Lima	(Brazil) Souza	(Germany) **Marko Marin**	(Ba'athist Syria) Omar Al Somah		(Bosnia and Herzegovina) Ervin Zukanović (Cape Verde) Djaniny (Serbia) Danijel Aleksić
Al-Ettifaq	(Algeria) Raïs M'Bolhi	(Brazil) **Elierce**	(Central African Republic) Cédric Yambéré	(Senegal) Souleymane Doukara	(Slovakia) Filip Kiss	(Tunisia) Naïm Sliti		(Brazil) Rogerinho (Morocco) Walid Azaro (Tunisia) Oussama Haddadi
Al-Faisaly	(Brazil) William Alves	(Brazil) **Guilherme Augusto**	(Brazil) Igor Rossi	(Brazil) Raphael Silva	(Netherlands) Youssef El Jebli	(Trinidad and Tobago) Khaleem Hyland		(Brazil) Luisinho (Curaçao) Roly Bonevacia
Al-Fateh	(Algeria) **Sofiane Bendebka**	(Denmark) **Bashkim Kadrii**	(Morocco) Marwane Saâdane	(Netherlands) Mitchell te Vrede	(Norway) Gustav Wikheim	(Ukraine) Maksym Koval	(Uruguay) Matías Aguirregaray	(Poland) Michał Janota (Portugal) André Pinto (Serbia) Saša Jovanović (Tunisia) Abdelkader Oueslati
Al-Fayha	(Brazil) Ângelo Neto	(Cape Verde) Gegé	(Chile) **Carlos Villanueva**	(Ghana) Samuel Owusu	(Madagascar) **Faneva Imà Andriatsima**	(Portugal) Arsénio		(Brazil) Rafael Assis (Chile) Ronnie Fernández (Jordan) Amer Shafi
Al-Hazem	(Algeria) Malik Asselah	(Brazil) Alemão	(Brazil) **Jonathan Cafú**	(Brazil) Muralha	(France) **Karim Yoda**	(Morocco) Driss Fettouhi	(Sweden) Carlos Strandberg	(Ghana) Ernest Asante (Mali) Ibrahima Tandia
Al-Hilal	(Brazil) Carlos Eduardo	(Colombia) Gustavo Cuéllar	(France) Bafétimbi Gomis	(Italy) Sebastian Giovinco	(Peru) André Carrillo	(South Korea) Jang Hyun-soo	(Ba'athist Syria) Omar Khribin	
Al-Ittihad	(Argentina) **Leonardo Gil**	(Brazil) **Marcelo Grohe**	(Brazil) Romarinho	(Brazil) **Bruno Uvini**	(Ivory Coast) **Wilfried Bony**	(Morocco) Karim El Ahmadi	(Tunisia) **Anice Badri**	(Argentina) Emiliano Vecchio (Brazil) Jonas (Chile) Luis Jiménez (Chile) Carlos Villanueva (Morocco) Manuel da Costa (Serbia) Aleksandar Prijović
Al-Nassr	(Australia) Brad Jones	(Brazil) Giuliano	(Brazil) Maicon	(Brazil) Petros	(Morocco) Nordin Amrabat	(Morocco) Abderrazak Hamdallah	(Nigeria) Ahmed Musa	
Al-Raed	(Algeria) Azzedine Doukha	(Cameroon) Arnaud Djoum	(Colombia) Marco Pérez	(Morocco) Jalal Daoudi	(Morocco) Mohamed Fouzair	(Ba'athist Syria) Jehad Al-Hussain		(Colombia) Ezequiel Palomeque
Al-Shabab	(Algeria) Djamel Benlamri	(Argentina) Cristian Guanca	(Brazil) Sebá	(Colombia) Danilo Asprilla	(Senegal) **Makhete Diop**	(Senegal) Alfred N'Diaye	(Tunisia) Farouk Ben Mustapha	(Brazil) Somália (The Gambia) Bubacarr Trawally
Al-Taawoun	(Brazil) Cássio	(Brazil) Sandro Manoel	(Brazil) Nildo Petrolina	(Burundi) Cédric Amissi	(Cape Verde) Héldon Ramos	(Portugal) Ricardo Machado		(Cameroon) Léandre Tawamba
Al-Wehda	(Australia) Craig Goodwin	(Brazil) Anselmo	(Brazil) **Élton Arábia**	(Brazil) Renato Chaves	(Brazil) **Luisinho**	(France) Youssoufou Niakaté	(Spain) Alberto Botía	(Algeria) Moustapha Zeghba (Benin) Khaled Adénon (Brazil) Marcos Guilherme (Turkey) Emre Çolak
Damac	(Algeria) **Farouk Chafaï**	(Algeria) **Ibrahim Chenihi**	(Algeria) **Moustapha Zeghba**	(Argentina) **Sergio Vittor**	(Argentina) **Emilio Zelaya**	(Tunisia) **Ghazi Ayadi**	(Tunisia) **Bilel Saidani**	(Algeria) Najib Ammari (Algeria) Chamseddine Rahmani (Brazil) Rafael Costa (Brazil) Jorge Fellipe (Guinea-Bissau) Zezinho (Ivory Coast) Aubin Kouakou (Morocco) Zakaria Hadraf (Morocco) Mouhcine Iajour (Senegal) Babacar Sarr

== League table ==
Pos	Team	Pld	W	D	L	GF	GA	GD	Pts	Qualification or relegation
1	Al-Hilal (C)	30	22	6	2	74	26	+48	72	Qualification for AFC Champions League group stage
2	Al-Nassr	30	19	7	4	60	26	+34	64	Qualification for AFC Champions League group stage
3	Al-Ahli	30	15	5	10	49	36	+13	50	Qualification for AFC Champions League group stage
4	Al-Wehda	30	16	1	13	45	40	+5	49	Qualification for AFC Champions League play-off round
5	Al-Faisaly	30	14	6	10	41	36	+5	48	
6	Al-Raed	30	13	7	10	41	50	−9	46	
7	Al-Shabab	30	12	7	11	38	37	+1	43	
8	Al-Ettifaq	30	13	3	14	46	38	+8	42	
9	Abha	30	11	5	14	41	52	−11	38	
10	Damac	30	9	8	13	37	52	−15	35 (Note: Positions determined by head-to-head points: Damac: 9 pts; Al-Ittihad: 6 pts; Al-Taawoun: 3 pts.)	
11	Al-Ittihad	30	9	8	13	42	41	+1	35	
12	Al-Taawoun	30	10	5	15	33	40	−7	35	
13	Al-Fateh	30	8	9	13	42	49	−7	33	
14	Al-Fayha (R)	30	8	8	14	34	44	−10	32	Relegation to Prince Mohammad bin Salman League
15	Al-Hazem (R)	30	7	6	17	40	61	−21	27	Relegation to Prince Mohammad bin Salman League
16	Al-Adalah (R)	30	4	9	17	27	62	−35	21	Relegation to Prince Mohammad bin Salman League

Updated to match(es) played on 9 September 2020. Source: spl.com
Rules for classification: 1) Points; 2) Head-to-head points; 3) Head-to-head goal difference; 4) Total goal difference; 5) Total goals scored; 6) Fair-play points (Note: Head-to-head record is used only after all the matches between the teams in question have been played).
(C) Champions; (R) Relegated

== Positions by round ==
The following table lists the positions of teams after each week of matches. In order to preserve the chronological evolution, any postponed matches are not included to the round at which they were originally scheduled but added to the full round they were played immediately afterward. If a club from the Saudi Professional League wins the King Cup, they will qualify for the AFC Champions League, unless they have already qualified for it through their league position. In this case, an additional AFC Champions League group stage berth will be given to the 3rd placed team, and the AFC Champions League play-off round spot will be given to 4th.

Team ╲ Round	1	2	3	4	5	6	7	8	9	10	11	12	13	14	15	16	17	18	19	20	21	22	23	24	25	26	27	28	29	30
Al-Hilal	1	1	1	1	1	1	1	1	1	1	3	5	7	1	2	1	1	1	1	1	1	1	1	1	1	1	1	1	1	1
Al-Nassr	3	2	2	5	5	8	6	5	2	2	1	1	1	2	1	2	2	2	2	2	2	2	2	2	2	2	2	2	2	2
Al-Ahli	7	4	9	4	4	3	3	4	3	3	4	2	3	3	3	3	3	3	3	3	3	4	3	3	3	3	3	3	3	3
Al-Wehda	15	14	12	8	3	2	2	3	6	5	2	4	2	6	4	5	4	4	4	4	4	3	4	4	5	4	4	4	4	4
Al-Faisaly	10	10	4	2	2	4	4	6	4	6	5	6	8	9	7	8	6	7	7	5	5	5	5	5	4	5	5	5	6	5
Al-Raed	14	16	14	15	14	13	14	13	9	10	8	8	5	4	6	6	7	5	5	6	6	7	6	7	6	6	6	6	5	6
Al-Shabab	5	5	6	7	11	7	5	2	5	7	9	10	9	8	9	7	8	8	8	8	7	8	7	6	7	7	8	8	7	7
Al-Ettifaq	4	8	3	6	9	12	12	10	11	13	11	12	10	10	11	11	11	12	11	10	11	10	9	8	8	8	7	7	8	8
Abha	13	9	10	11	7	11	9	8	10	9	7	7	4	7	8	9	9	9	10	11	10	9	8	9	9	9	9	9	9	9
Damac	16	15	13	12	15	15	16	16	16	16	15	16	16	16	16	16	16	14	16	15	15	15	15	15	15	15	14	14	14	10
Al-Ittihad	2	7	11	14	10	6	8	11	13	12	13	13	13	13	12	12	12	13	13	12	12	13	13	13	12	12	11	11	11	11
Al-Taawoun	6	11	8	10	13	10	11	9	8	4	6	3	6	5	5	4	5	6	6	7	8	6	10	10	10	10	10	10	12	12
Al-Fateh	12	13	16	16	16	16	15	15	15	15	16	15	14	14	14	15	15	16	14	14	14	14	14	14	13	14	12	12	10	13
Al-Fayha	11	6	5	9	12	14	13	12	12	11	12	9	11	11	10	10	10	11	9	9	9	11	11	11	11	11	13	13	13	14
Al-Hazem	8	12	15	13	8	5	7	7	7	8	10	11	12	12	13	13	13	10	12	13	13	12	12	12	14	13	15	15	15	15
Al-Adalah	9	3	7	3	6	9	10	14	14	14	14	14	15	15	15	14	14	15	15	16	16	16	16	16	16	16	16	16	16	16

Leader
2021 AFC Champions League group stage
2021 AFC Champions League play-off round
Relegation to 2020–21 MS League

Updated to match(es) played on 9 September 2020. Source: spl.com.sa

== Results ==
Home \ Away	ABH	ADA	AHL	ETT	FSY	FAT	FAY	HAZ	HIL	ITT	NSR	RAE	SHB	TWN	WHD	DAM
Abha		2–2	2–1	1–0	0–1	3–1	1–1	0–2	1–2	2–1	0–2	1–1	2–0	2–1	1–4	3–2
Al-Adalah	2–1		1–1	0–1	0–2	3–5	1–1	2–2	0–4	0–2	0–3	1–1	0–1	0–0	2–4	4–0
Al-Ahli	3–1	1–1		3–2	3–1	0–1	1–0	4–2	2–1	2–1	0–0	2–0	1–1	3–1	1–2	5–1
Al-Ettifaq	4–1	1–0	1–2		0–1	1–0	3–2	2–3	1–4	1–2	0–1	4–0	1–0	1–0	3–1	0–2
Al-Faisaly	2–1	3–1	2–0	1–2		3–2	0–0	1–0	2–2	1–1	3–2	0–1	2–1	2–1	2–1	2–0
Al-Fateh	2–1	0–1	0–2	1–1	2–2		2–0	2–1	3–3	1–1	0–1	2–2	1–2	1–0	3–2	0–0
Al-Fayha	0–2	2–0	0–3	1–1	2–1	3–1		2–1	0–1	4–1	1–4	3–1	1–1	2–2	0–1	0–0
Al-Hazem	2–3	1–2	2–1	0–6	2–2	3–4	4–2		1–1	1–1	0–2	2–3	0–1	0–0	0–2	4–0
Al-Hilal	4–2	7–0	3–1	1–0	2–0	2–1	1–1	4–1		1–0	1–2	3–1	2–1	2–1	3–1	3–0
Al-Ittihad	1–2	0–0	1–2	1–0	1–2	1–1	4–1	1–2	1–3		1–1	3–1	5–1	3–1	1–2	1–2
Al-Nassr	4–0	6–1	2–2	3–2	2–0	1–1	2–1	0–1	1–4	1–1		4–1	0–0	2–1	1–0	2–0
Al-Raed	2–1	1–0	1–2	3–2	2–1	0–0	2–0	3–1	0–5	1–1	0–2		2–1	0–3	3–2	3–0
Al-Shabab	1–1	4–0	1–0	2–1	0–0	2–1	0–1	1–0	0–0	1–2	2–4	3–4		1–0	2–0	3–2
Al-Taawoun	1–0	3–2	1–0	0–1	2–1	2–1	1–0	1–1	0–1	1–2	1–4	1–1	3–1		2–1	0–2
Al-Wehda	1–2	2–0	2–0	0–2	1–0	2–0	0–2	5–1	1–3	1–0	1–0	0–0	0–3	2–1		3–2
Damac	2–2	1–1	2–1	2–2	2–1	4–3	2–1	3–0	1–1	2–1	1–1	0–1	1–1	1–2	0–1	

Updated to match(es) played on 9 September 2020. Source: goalzz.com
Legend: Blue = home team win; Yellow = draw; Red = away team win.

== Season statistics ==
As of 9 September 2020

=== Scoring ===
==== Top scorers ====
Rank	Player	Club	Goals
1	(Morocco) Abderrazak Hamdallah	Al-Nassr	29
2	(France) Bafétimbi Gomis	Al-Hilal	27
3	(Ba'athist Syria) Omar Al Somah	Al-Ahli	19
4	(France) Youssouf Niakaté	Al-Wehda	16
5	(Brazil) Romarinho	Al-Ittihad	15
6	(Sweden) Carlos Strandberg	Al-Hazem	13
6	(Argentina) Emilio Zelaya	Damac	13
8	(Brazil) Carlos Eduardo	Al-Hilal	12
8	(Suriname) Mitchell te Vrede	Al-Fateh	12
10	(Brazil) Giuliano	Al-Nassr	11
10	(Tunisia) Saad Bguir	Abha	11
10	(Argentina) Cristian Guanca	Al-Shabab	11

==== Hat-tricks ====
Player	For	Against	Result	Date	Ref.
(Chile) Ronnie Fernández	Al-Fayha	Al-Ittihad	4–1 (H)	19 December 2019	
(Morocco) Abderrazak Hamdallah	Al-Nassr	Al-Fayha	4–1 (A)	28 December 2019	
(France) Bafétimbi Gomis	Al-Hilal	Al-Adalah	7–0 (H)	30 December 2019	
(Morocco) Abderrazak Hamdallah	Al-Nassr	Al-Shabab	4–2 (A)	14 February 2020	
(Morocco) Abderrazak Hamdallah	Al-Nassr	Al-Taawoun	4–1 (A)	20 August 2020	
(France) Bafétimbi Gomis	Al-Hilal	Al-Hazem	4–1 (H)	29 August 2020	

=== Clean sheets ===
Rank	Player	Club	Clean sheets
1	(Australia) Brad Jones	Al-Nassr	12
2	(Tunisia) Farouk Ben Mustapha	Al-Shabab	10
3	(Saudi Arabia) Abdullah Al-Mayouf	Al-Hilal	9
3	(Algeria) Moustapha Zeghba	Al-Wehda/Damac	9
5	(Saudi Arabia) Mustafa Malayekah	Al-Faisaly	8
5	(Algeria) Raïs M'Bolhi	Al-Ettifaq	8
7	(Algeria) Azzedine Doukha	Al-Raed	6
7	(Brazil) Cássio	Al-Taawoun	6
9	(Saudi Arabia) Abdullah Al-Jadaani	Al-Wehda	5
10	(Saudi Arabia) Mohammed Al-Owais	Al-Ahli	4
10	(Saudi Arabia) Habib Al-Wotayan	Al-Fateh	4
10	(Algeria) Malik Asselah	Al-Hazem	4

=== Discipline ===
==== Player ====
- Most yellow cards: 12
  - (Spain) Alberto Botía (Al-Wehda)
  - (Trinidad and Tobago) Khaleem Hyland (Al-Faisaly)
- Most red cards: 3
  - (Saudi Arabia) Mohammed Al-Saiari (Al-Wehda/Al-Faisaly)
  - (Saudi Arabia) Karam Barnawi (Abha)

==== Club ====
- Most yellow cards: 75
  - Al-Wehda
- Most red cards: 7
  - Al-Shabab

== Attendances ==
=== By round ===
2019–20 Professional League Attendance
Round	Total	GP.	Avg. Per Game
Round 1	82,409	8	10,301
Round 2	67,420	8	8,428
Round 3	66,994	8	8,374
Round 4	114,245	8	14,281
Round 5	83,713	8	10,464
Round 6	73,691	8	9,211
Round 7	64,943	8	8,118
Round 8	61,136	8	7,642
Round 9	80,904	8	10,113
Round 10	63,207	8	7,901
Round 11	60,629	8	7,579
Round 12	29,098	8	3,637
Round 13	38,511	8	4,814
Round 14	68,427	8	8,553
Round 15	72,370	8	9,046
Round 16	68,354	8	8,544
Round 17	53,456	8	6,682
Round 18	66,577	8	8,322
Round 19	64,639	8	8,080
Round 20	87,907	8	10,988
Round 21 (Note: Matches from 7 March and onwards will be played behind closed doors.)	30,474	5	6,095
Round 22	0	8	0
Round 23	0	8	0
Round 24	0	8	0
Round 25	0	8	0
Round 26	0	8	0
Round 27	0	8	0
Round 28	0	8	0
Round 29	0	8	0
Round 30	0	8	0
Total	1,399,104	165	8,479

=== By team ===
Pos	Team	Total	High	Low	Average	Change
1	Al-Hilal	188,229	21,792	15,561	18,823	−3.7%
2	Al-Ittihad	175,108	43,783	5,112	17,511	−47.7%
3	Al-Nassr	118,221	17,078	10,922	13,136	−19.9%
4	Al-Ahli	140,713	30,198	5,018	12,792	−32.0%
5	Al-Adalah	103,936	15,304	5,441	10,394	n/a †
6	Al-Fateh	92,420	14,000	2,007	10,269	+199.6%
7	Al-Shabab	92,872	12,719	1,160	7,739	+125.8%
8	Al-Wehda	79,665	10,807	1,146	7,242	+4.8%
9	Al-Ettifaq	78,717	13,558	1,704	7,156	+45.7%
10	Damac	66,048	14,680	1,320	6,605	n/a †
11	Al-Raed	54,508	11,601	1,408	4,955	+32.3%
12	Al-Taawoun	46,602	15,650	1,545	4,660	+4.9%
13	Al-Faisaly	39,610	5,600	3,664	4,401	+275.8%
14	Al-Fayha	45,581	5,752	2,586	4,144	+118.6%
15	Al-Hazem	41,605	5,400	3,125	3,782	+84.4%
16	Abha	35,269	16,820	581	3,527	n/a †
	League total	1,399,104	43,783	581	8,479	+1.5%

Updated to games played on 6 March 2020
Notes:
^{†} Teams played previous season in MS League.

== Awards ==
=== Monthly awards ===
Month	Manager of the Month		Player of the Month		Goalkeeper of the Month		Reference
Month	Manager	Club	Player	Club	Player	Club	Reference
September	(Romania) Răzvan Lucescu	Al-Hilal	(Brazil) Romarinho	Al-Ittihad	(Australia) Brad Jones	Al-Nassr	
October	(Portugal) Rui Vitória	Al-Nassr	(Brazil) Carlos Eduardo	Al-Hilal	(Australia) Brad Jones	Al-Nassr	
November & December	(Kosovo) Besnik Hasi	Al-Raed	(Tunisia) Saad Bguir	Abha	(Algeria) Raïs M'Bolhi	Al-Ettifaq	
January	(Romania) Răzvan Lucescu	Al-Hilal	(Italy) Sebastian Giovinco	Al-Hilal	(Tunisia) Farouk Ben Mustapha	Al-Shabab	
February	(Romania) Răzvan Lucescu	Al-Hilal	(Netherlands) Youssef El Jebli	Al-Faisaly	(Saudi Arabia) Abdullah Al-Mayouf	Al-Hilal	
March	(Tunisia) Abderrazek Chebbi	Abha	(Brazil) Luisinho	Al-Wehda	(Algeria) Raïs M'Bolhi	Al-Ettifaq	
August	(Portugal) Rui Vitória	Al-Nassr	(Morocco) Abderrazak Hamdallah	Al-Nassr	(Brazil) Marcelo Grohe	Al-Ittihad	

=== Team of the Season ===
Team of the Season
Goalkeeper	(Saudi Arabia) Abdullah Al-Mayouf (Al-Hilal)			
Defenders	(Saudi Arabia) Sultan Al-Ghannam (Al-Nassr)		(Brazil) Maicon (Al-Nassr)	(Brazil) Igor Rossi (Al-Faisaly)
Midfielders	(Brazil) Anselmo de Moraes (Al-Wehda)	(Brazil) Petros (Al-Nassr)	(Morocco) Nordin Amrabat (Al-Nassr)	(Brazil) Carlos Eduardo (Al-Hilal)
Forwards	(Italy) Sebastian Giovinco (Al-Hilal)		(France) Bafétimbi Gomis (Al-Hilal)	(Morocco) Abderrazak Hamdallah (Al-Nassr)

== See also ==
- 2019–20 Prince Mohammad bin Salman League
- 2019–20 Second Division
- 2020 King Cup
- 2019 Super Cup
