= Ammar Al-Najjar =

Saudi Arabian footballer

Personal information
- Full name: Ammar Seraj Al-Najjar
- Date of birth: February 24, 1997 (age 29)
- Place of birth: Jeddah, Saudi Arabia
- Height: 1.66 m (5 ft 5 in)
- Position: Winger

Team information
- Current team: Al-Wehda (on loan from Al-Najma)
- Number: 90

Youth career
- 2007-2017: Al-Ittihad

Senior career*
Years	Team	Apps	(Gls)
2017–2019	Al-Ittihad	27	(4)
2019	→ Al-Fateh (loan)	2	(0)
2019–2021	Abha	33	(3)
2021	Al-Shabab	4	(0)
2021–2023	Damac	27	(0)
2023–2024	Al-Hazem	6	(0)
2024–2025	Jeddah	28	(8)
2025–	Al-Najma	3	(0)
2026–	→ Al-Wehda (loan)	0	(0)

International career
2016–2018	Saudi Arabia U23		
- * Club domestic league appearances and goals as of 30 May 2023

Ammar Al-Najjar (Arabic: عمار النجار; born 24 February 1997) is a Saudi Arabian footballer who plays for Al-Wehda on loan from Al-Najma.

== Career ==
Al-Najjar started his career at the youth teams of Al-Ittihad. He made his debut on 11 February 2017 in the league match against Al-Taawoun. On 10 March 2017, Al-Najjar started the Crown Prince Cup final against Al-Nassr as Al-Ittihad won the match 1–0 to win their eighth title. He scored his first goal for the club on 14 April 2017 against Al-Qadsiah.

On 5 May 2017, Al-Najjar was called for the national team training camp that took place in Riyadh and lasted a week. On 12 May 2018, Al-Najjar came off the bench in the 79th minute in the King Cup final against Al-Faisaly. Al-Ittihad won the match 2–1 to win their ninth King Cup title. On 18 January 2019, Al-Najjar joined Al-Fateh on loan until the end of the season.

On 13 July 2019, Al-Najjar joined Abha on a free transfer after he was released by Al-Ittihad. He made his debut in the 4–2 away loss against Al-Hilal. On 30 August 2019, Al-Najjar scored his first goal for Abha against Al-Wehda in the 2–1 win. He scored the second goal in the 90th minute from a long-range shot.

On 14 August 2021, Al-Najjar joined Damac on loan from Al-Shabab. On 28 July 2023, Al-Najjar joined Al-Hazem on a free transfer. On 25 July 2024, Al-Najjar joined First Division side Jeddah. On 4 August 2025, Al-Najjar joined Al-Najma. On 21 January 2026, Al-Najjar joined Al-Wehda on loan.

== Career statistics ==
=== Club ===
As of match played 30 May 2023

Club	Season	League			King Cup		Asia		Other		Total	
Club	Season	Division	Apps	Goals	Apps	Goals	Apps	Goals	Apps	Goals	Apps	Goals
Al-Ittihad	2016–17	Pro League	9	3	0	0	—		1 (Note: Appearances in Crown Prince Cup)	0	10	3
Al-Ittihad	2017–18	Pro League	16	1	4	0	—		—		20	1
Al-Ittihad	2018–19	Pro League	2	0	1	0	—		—		3	0
Al-Ittihad	Total		27	4	5	0	0	0	1	0	33	4
Al-Fateh (loan)	2018–19	Pro League	2	0	0	0	—		—		2	0
Abha	2019–20	Pro League	25	3	3	0	—		—		28	3
Abha	2020–21	Pro League	8	0	1	0	—		—		9	0
Abha	Total		33	3	4	0	0	0	0	0	37	3
Al-Shabab	2020–21	Pro League	4	0	0	0	—		—		4	0
Damac	2021–22	Pro League	17	0	0	0	—		—		17	0
Damac	2022–23	Pro League	10	0	0	0	—		—		10	0
Damac	Total		27	0	0	0	0	0	0	0	27	0
Career totals			93	7	9	0	0	0	1	0	103	7

== Honours ==
Al-Ittihad

- King Cup: 2018
- Crown Prince Cup: 2016–17
