= Faneva Imà Andriatsima =

Malagasy footballer (born 1984)

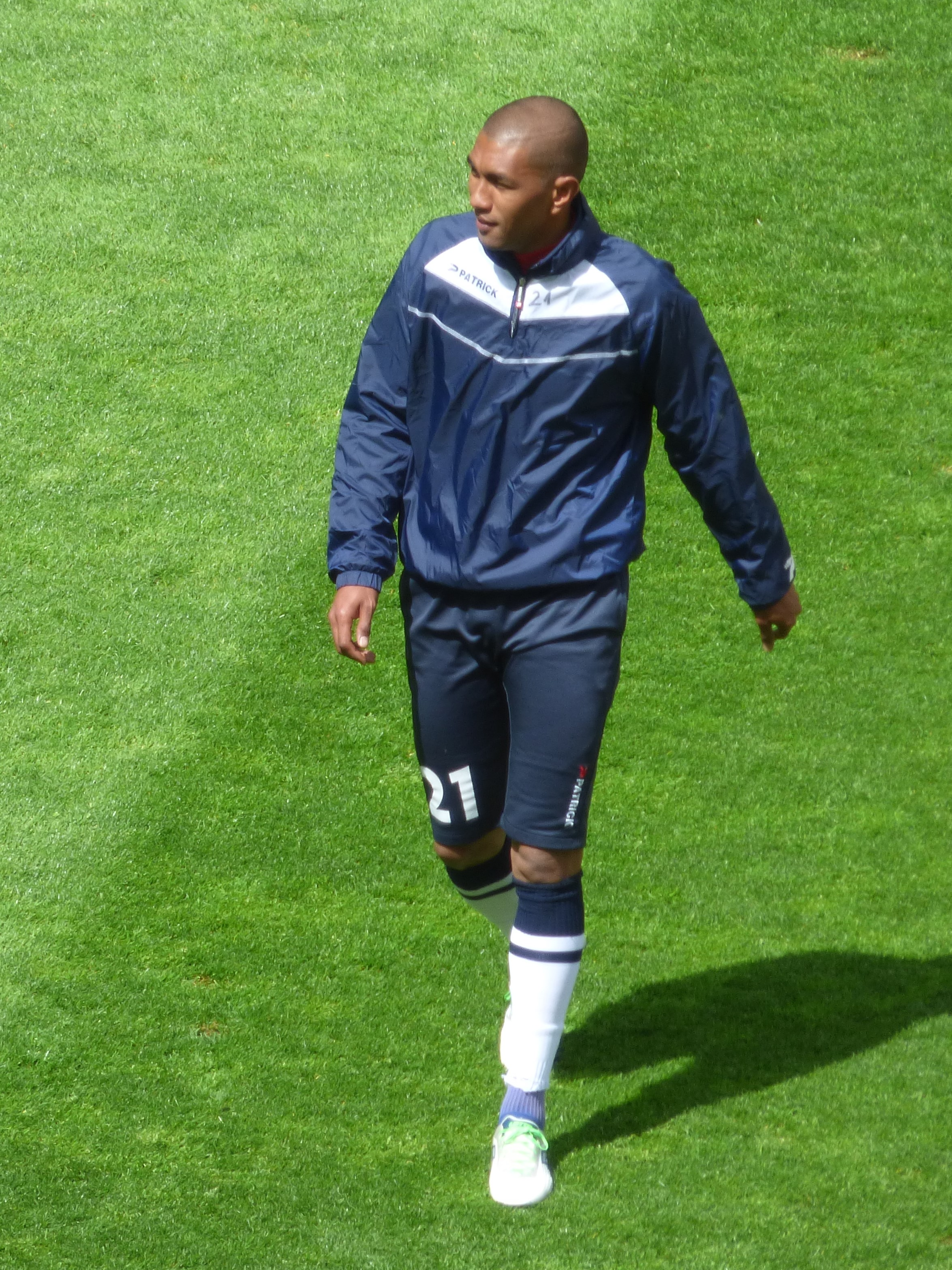

Personal information
- Full name: Faneva Imà Andriatsima
- Date of birth: 3 June 1984 (age 42)
- Place of birth: Antananarivo, Madagascar
- Height: 1.84 m (6 ft 0 in)
- Position: Forward

Youth career
- 1999–2001: AS St-Michel
- 2001–2004: USCA Foot

Senior career*
Years	Team	Apps	(Gls)
2004–2007	USCA Foot	60	(45)
2007–2009	Nantes	5	(0)
2008	→ Cannes (loan)	16	(4)
2008–2009	→ Boulogne (loan)	8	(0)
2009–2010	Amiens	27	(6)
2010–2012	AS Beauvais	53	(9)
2012–2016	Créteil	123	(40)
2016–2018	Sochaux	47	(16)
2018	Le Havre	11	(0)
2018–2019	Clermont	28	(1)
2019–2020	Abha	11	(5)
2020	Al-Fayha	13	(1)
2020–2021	Al-Hamriyah		

International career^{‡}
2004–2006	Madagascar U21	6	(4)
2003–2019	Madagascar	47	(14)
- * Club domestic league appearances and goals as of 17:42, 14 December 2020 (UTC) ‡ National team caps and goals as of 20:00, 12 July 2019 (UTC)

Faneva Imà Andriatsima (born 3 June 1984) is a Malagasy professional footballer who plays as a forward.

== Career ==
Born in the Malagasy capital, Antananarivo, Andriatsima began his career at homeland club AS St-Michel. In 2004, he joined USCA Foot and scored 45 goals in 60 appearances for his new side.

In 2007, he made the switch to French Ligue 2, where he joined FC Nantes.

On 7 January 2008, he joined Championnat National side AS Cannes on loan, for the remainder of the season, playing 16 games and scoring 4 goals.

In June 2008, Andriatsima joined side US Boulogne in the French second tier, again on loan, for the 2008–09 season. He was given the number nine shirt. On 11 July 2009, he left Nantes and signed for Amiens SC.

In 2016, he moved to Sochaux.

== International ==
Andriatsima played internationally for Madagascar, and was his side's top scorer in 2010 FIFA World Cup qualification. In 2019, Andriatsima confirmed he would retire from international football. He played at 2019 Africa Cup of Nations when Madagascar made a sensational advance to the quarterfinals.

== Personal life ==
Andriatsima holds both Malagasy and French nationalities.

== Career statistics ==
=== Club ===
As of 15 March 2020

Appearances and goals by club, season and competition
Club	Season	League			Cup			Total		Ref.
Club	Season	Division	Apps	Goals	Comp	Apps	Goals	Apps	Goals	Ref.
US Boulogne	2008–09	Ligue 2	8	0	CDF+CDL	1+1	0+1	10	1	
US Boulogne	Total		8	0	CDL+CDF	1+1	0+1	10	1	–
Amiens SC	2009–10	National	27	6	CDF+CDL	0+2	0	29	6	
Amiens SC	Total		27	6	CDL+CDF	0+2	0	29	6	–
AS Beauvais	2010–11	National	19	6	–	–	–	19	6	
AS Beauvais	2011–12	National	21	1	–	–	–	21	1	
AS Beauvais	Total		40	7	–	–	–	40	7	–
US Créteil	2012–13	National	35	13	–	–	–	35	13	
US Créteil	2013–14	Ligue 2	36	11	CDF+CDL	2+3	0+1	41	12	
US Créteil	2014–15	Ligue 2	30	7	CDL	4	0	34	7	
US Créteil	2015–16	Ligue 2	35	11	CDL	1	0	28	1	
US Créteil	Total		136	42	CDL+CDF	2+8	0+1	146	43	–
FC Sochaux	2016–17	Ligue 2	35	14	CDL	3	1	38	15	
FC Sochaux	2018	Ligue 2	14	2	–	–	–	14	2	
FC Sochaux	Total		49	16	CDL	3	1	52	17	–
Havre AC	2017–18	Ligue 2	14	0	CDL	1	0	15	0	
Havre AC	Total		14	0	–	1	0	15	0	–
Clermont Foot	2018–19	Ligue 2	30	1	CDF+CDL	2+1	1+0	33	2	
Clermont Foot	Total		30	1	CDL+CDF	2+1	1+0	33	1	–
Abha Club	2019	SPL	12	5	KIC	2	2	14	7	
Abha Club	Total		12	5	KIC	2	2	14	7	–
Al-Fayha FC	2019–20	SPL	5	0	–	–	–	5	0	
Al-Fayha FC	Total		5	0	–	–	–	5	0	–
Career total			321	77	NB Cup Apps	23	6	344	83	–

=== International ===
Appearances and goals by national team and year
National team	Year	Apps	Goals
Madagascar	2003	1	0
Madagascar	2005	1	1
Madagascar	2006	3	0
Madagascar	2007	5	5
Madagascar	2008	4	0
Madagascar	2010	2	0
Madagascar	2012	1	0
Madagascar	2014	2	1
Madagascar	2015	4	1
Madagascar	2016	3	1
Madagascar	2017	5	2
Madagascar	2018	6	1
Madagascar	2019	10	2
Madagascar	2021	2	0
Total		49	14

Scores and results list Madagascar's goal tally first, score column indicates score after each Andriatsima goal.

List of international goals scored by Faneva Imà Andriatsima
No.	Date	Venue	Opponent	Score	Result	Competition	Ref.
1	23 October 2005	Mahamasina Municipal Stadium, Antananarivo, Madagascar	Mauritius	2–0	2–0	Friendly	
2	29 April 2007	Estádio da Machava, Maputo, Mozambique	Seychelles	5–0	5–0	2007 COSAFA Cup	
3	14 October 2007	Mahamasina Municipal Stadium, Antananarivo, Madagascar	Comoros	1–1	6–2	2010 FIFA World Cup qualification	
4	14 October 2007	Mahamasina Municipal Stadium, Antananarivo, Madagascar	Comoros	2–1	6–2	2010 FIFA World Cup qualification	
5	14 October 2007	Mahamasina Municipal Stadium, Antananarivo, Madagascar	Comoros	3–1	6–2	2010 FIFA World Cup qualification	
6	14 October 2007	Mahamasina Municipal Stadium, Antananarivo, Madagascar	Comoros	4–2	6–2	2010 FIFA World Cup qualification	
7	18 May 2014	Rabemananjara Stadium, Mahajanga, Madagascar	Uganda	1–0	2–1	2015 Africa Cup of Nations qualification	
8	13 November 2015	Mahamasina Municipal Stadium, Antananarivo, Madagascar	Senegal	1–0	2–2	2018 FIFA World Cup qualification	
9	28 March 2016	Barthélemy Boganda Stadium, Bangui, Central African Republic	Central African Republic	1–0	1–2	2017 Africa Cup of Nations qualification	
10	9 June 2017	Al-Ubayyid Stadion, El-Obeid, Sudan	Sudan	1–0	3–1	2019 Africa Cup of Nations qualification	
11	9 June 2017	Al-Ubayyid Stadion, El-Obeid, Sudan	Sudan	3–1	3–1	2019 Africa Cup of Nations qualification	
12	13 October 2018	Estadio de Bata, Bata, Equatorial Guinea	Equatorial Guinea	1–0	1–0	2019 Africa Cup of Nations qualification	
13	2 June 2019	Stade Josy Barthel, Luxembourg City, Luxembourg	Luxembourg	2–1	3–3	Friendly	
14	7 July 2019	Alexandria Stadium, Alexandria, Egypt	DR Congo	2–1	2–2	2019 Africa Cup of Nations	

== Honours ==
=== Club ===
USCA Foot

- THB Champions League (1) : Champion : 2005
- Coupe de Madagascar (1) : 2005

Créteil

- Championnat National (1) : 2013

=== Individual ===
National Team

- Nominees shortlist for African Player of the year : 2018
- Top scorer Africa Cup of Nations qualification Group A : 2019
- Knight Order of Madagascar: 2019

=== Record ===
- First malagasy player nominated for the African Player of the year trophy : 2018
