= Sultan Al-Sherif =

Saudi Arabian footballer

Personal information
- Full name: Sultan Abdullah Al-Sherif
- Date of birth: December 26, 1991 (age 34)
- Place of birth: Medina, Saudi Arabia
- Position: Midfielder

Youth career
- Al-Ahli

Senior career*
Years	Team	Apps	(Gls)
2013–2015	Najran	33	(0)
2015–2018	Al-Raed	36	(0)
2018–2019	Al-Washm	20	(0)
2019–2020	Abha	0	(0)
2020	Al-Tai	11	(0)
2020–2022	Ohod	28	(0)
2022–2023	Al-Shaeib		
2023–2024	Al-Kawkab		
- * Club domestic league appearances and goals

Sultan Al-Sherif (Arabic: سلطان الشريف; born 26 December 1991) is a Saudi football player who currently plays as a midfielder.

== Career ==
Al-Sherif began his career at Al-Ahli and signed his first professional contract with the club on 25 June 2012. On 24 June 2013, Al-Sherif joined Pro League side Najran on a one-year contract. On 22 June 2014, Al-Sherif renewed his contract with Najran. On 12 July 2015, Al-Sherif joined Al-Raed. On 30 June 2018, Al-Sherif joined First Division side Al-Washm on a free transfer. On 6 July 2019, Al-Sherif joined Pro League side Abha. On 22 January 2020, Al-Sherif was released from his contract without making an appearance for the club. On 25 January 2020, Al-Sherif joined First Division side Al-Tai. On 4 October 2020, Al-Sherif joined Ohod.
