= Jassem Hamdouni =

Tunisian footballer

Personal information
- Date of birth: 17 December 1996 (age 29)
- Positions: Midfielder; winger

Team information
- Current team: CS Sfaxien
- Number: 15

Senior career*
Years	Team	Apps	(Gls)
2014–2018	CA Bizertin	41	(3)
2018–	CS Sfaxien	34	(3)
2021	→ AS Rejiche (loan)	12	(3)

International career
2018	Tunisia	1	(0)
- * Club domestic league appearances and goals as of 20:31, 11 December 2021 (UTC)

Jassem Hamdouni (born 17 December 1996) is a Tunisian football midfielder who currently plays for CS Sfaxien.
