= Reuben Gabriel =

Nigerian footballer (born 1990)

Personal information
- Full name: Reuben Shalu Gabriel
- Date of birth: 25 September 1990 (age 36)
- Place of birth: Kaduna, Nigeria
- Height: 1.95 m (6 ft 5 in)
- Position: Defensive midfielder

Senior career*
| Years | Team | Apps | (Gls) |
| 2007–2009 | Kaduna United | 75 | (2) |
| 2009–2010 | Enyimba International | 44 | (1) |
| 2011–2013 | Kano Pillars | 67 | (1) |
| 2013–2014 | Kilmarnock | 3 | (0) |
| 2014 | Waasland-Beveren | 5 | (3) |
| 2014–2016 | Boavista Porto | 36 | (1) |
| 2016 | AS Trenčín | 11 | (1) |
| 2017–2019 | KuPS | 38 | (7) |
| 2019 | Najran | 12 | (4) |
| 2019–2020 | Abha | 16 | (1) |
| 2020–2021 | Al-Fayha | 35 | (2) |
| 2021 | Al-Ain | 0 | (0) |
| 2024–2025 | Shabab Sahel | 22 | (1) |

International career^{‡}
| 2010–2014 | Nigeria | 12 | (1) |
Medal record
Men's football
Representing Nigeria
Africa Cup of Nations
| Winner | 2013 South Africa |
- * Club domestic league appearances and goals as of 25 November 2018 ‡ National team caps and goals as of 25 April 2026

Reuben Shalu Gabriel MON (born 25 September 1990) is a Nigerian professional footballer who plays as a defensive midfielder.

== Club career ==
=== Nigeria ===
Gabriel was born in Kaduna. In his country he played for Kaduna United FC, Enyimba International F.C. and Kano Pillars FC.

In October 2012, Gabriel was named both the Player of the Year and the National Team Player of the Year at the 2012 League Bloggers Awards (LBA), held in Lagos.

=== Kilmarnock ===
On 2 April 2013, Gabriel joined Scottish Premier League side Kilmarnock as a free agent, signing a three-year contract. He made his debut for his new team on 29 November, in a Scottish Cup tie against Dundee United where he conceded a penalty in a 5–2 away defeat.

In November 2013, Reuben demanded to leave Kilmarnock in the January 2014 window. He was released in January, after the club accepted his request.

=== Waasland-Beveren ===
In January 2014, Reuben went on trial with Tottenham Hotspur in the Premier League. However, nothing came of it, and he joined Belgian Pro League side Waasland-Beveren on a one-and-a-half-year contract late in the month.

Gabriel was Veikkausliiga Player of the Month in September 2017.

=== Al-Ain ===
On 3 September 2021, Gabriel joined Al-Ain.

== International career ==
Gabriel made his debut for Nigeria in March 2010, in a 5–2 win against the Democratic Republic of the Congo. Previously, he was a member of the national B-team that won the 2010 WAFU Nations Cup.

Reuben scored his first international on 9 June 2012, netting the opener in an eventual 1–1 away draw against Malawi for the 2014 FIFA World Cup qualifiers. He was called to the 23-man squad for the 2013 Africa Cup of Nations, being an unused player as the Super Eagles won the tournament in South Africa.

Reuben was also selected to the 2014 World Cup by coach Stephen Keshi. He made his debut in the tournament on 30 June, replacing injured Ogenyi Onazi in the 59th minute of an eventual 0–2 loss to France for the round-of-16.

== Honours ==
Orders

- Member of the Order of the Niger
