= Abderrazek Chebbi =

Tunisian footballer and manager

Personal information
- Full name: Abderrazek Alhadi Chebbi
- Date of birth: 9 February 1962 (age 64)
- Place of birth: Tunisia
- Position: Defender

Team information
- Current team: Al-Jandal (manager)

Youth career
- Étoile du Sahel

Senior career*
| Years | Team | Apps | (Gls) |
- Étoile du Sahel

Managerial career
- 1990–1992: Étoile du Sahel (assistant)
- 1995–1996: Étoile du Sahel (assistant)
- 2001–2002: ES Hammam-Sousse
- 2002–2004: Al-Rayyan
- 2004–2006: Al-Jabalain
- 2006–2007: Al-Ansar
- 2007: Al-Jabalain
- 2007–2008: Al-Faisaly
- 2008–2009: Al-Qadsiah
- 2009–2010: Al-Taawoun
- 2011: Al-Khaleej
- 2011–2012: Al-Watani
- 2012–2013: ES Hammam-Sousse
- 2013: Sdoos
- 2013–2014: Al-Qadsiah
- 2014: Al-Wehda
- 2014–2015: Al-Fayha
- 2015–2016: Al-Riyadh
- 2016–2018: Al-Qaisumah
- 2018–2021: Abha
- 2022: Al-Sahel
- 2022–2023: Al-Kholood
- 2023–2024: Al-Qaisumah
- 2024–2025: Abha
- 2025–: Al-Jandal
- * Club domestic league appearances and goals

Abderrazek Chebbi (Arabic: عبدالرزاق الشابي; born 9 February 1962) is a Tunisian football coach and former player who played for Étoile du Sahel. He is the current manager of Al-Jandal.

== Career ==
He spent his whole playing career with Étoile du Sahel and made his debut in the early 1980s. He retired in 1990 and was made assistant manager in 1990. In 1995, he won the 1995 CAF Cup as the assistant manager of Brazilian coach Dutra. He was then named as the manager of ES Hammam-Sousse in 2001 before to Qatar to manage Al-Rayyan in 2002.

On 26 December 2004, Chebbi was named as the manager of Al-Jabalain. This would the first of many Saudi clubs he would take charge of. His first match ended in a 2–1 defeat against Al-Raed on 29 December 2004. In his first season, Chebbi guided Al-Jabalain to a ninth-placed finish 9 points clear of relegation. Chebbi's contract was renewed for another year on 13 August 2005. In his second season, Al-Jabalain managed to finish seventh two positions and two points more than what they changed last season. On 29 April 2006, Al-Ansar announced that they had hired Chebbi as their new manager. On 23 February 2007, Chebbi was sacked after a run of 10 league games without a win. He also led the club to the final of the Prince Faisal Cup losing to Al-Raed in the final. On 7 March 2007, Chebbi returned to Al-Jabalain on a contract that lasted until the end of the season. Chebbi managed to save the club from relegation and finished 12th just two points above the relegation zone.

On 10 November 2007, Al-Faisaly announced that they had hired Chebbi on a contract that lasted until the end of the season. On 17 January 2008, during a training session, Chebbi injured one of his ligaments in his foot and underwent surgery. On 16 February 2008, Chebbi resigned as manager of Al-Faisaly due to his rehabilitation process. On 3 October 2008, Chebbi signed a one-year contract to manage Al-Qadsiah. On 7 May 2009, Chebbi lead Al-Qadsiah to the 2008–09 Saudi First Division title and promotion to the Pro League. Despite leading the club to promotion, his contract wasn't renewed at the end of the season. On 31 May 2009, Chebbi signed a contract to manage Al-Taawoun. On 1 January 2010, Chebbi was sacked by Al-Taawoun after a run of six league games without a win. On 5 January 2011, Chebbi signed a six-month contract with Al-Khaleej. On 22 October 2011, Al-Watani announced Chebbi as their new manager until the end of the season. On 20 March 2012, Chebbi was sacked by Al-Watani. On 26 November 2012, Chebbi returned to Tunisia to manage ES Hammam-Sousse. On 10 January 2013, he resigned as manager due to disagreements with the board.

On 6 February 2013, Chebbi returned to Saudi Arabia to manage Sdoos until the end of the season. Despite his best efforts, Chebbi could not prevent Sdoos' relegation to the Second Division. On 7 August 2013, Chebbi returned to manage Al-Qadsiah. On 11 February 2014, Chebbi was sacked. On 28 February 2014, Chebbi replaced Egyptian manager Mohamed Salah as manager of Al-Wehda until the end of the season. On 13 November 2014, Chebbi signed a contract until the end of the season with Al-Fayha to replace fellow Tunisian manager Ahmed Labyad. At the time of his appointment, Al-Fayha sat at the bottom of the table. Chebbi managed to steer Al-Fayha out of the relegation and finish 11th. His contract wasn't renewed at the end of the season.

On 18 December 2015, Chebbi was appointed as the manager of Al-Riyadh. Al-Riyadh won only 1 out of 14 matches and sat at the bottom of the table. Despite his best efforts, Chebbi could not prevent Al-Riyadh's relegation to the Second Division. On 29 November 2016, Chebbi was appointed as the manager of Al-Qaisumah. On 2 July 2017, Chebbi renewed his contract with Al-Qaisumah for a further year. On 13 June 2018, Chebbi was appointed as the manager of Abha. On 11 May 2019, Chebbi lead Abha to their first MS League title and promotion to the Pro League. On 9 May 2019, Chebbi renewed his contract with Abha for a further year. On 11 February 2020, he renewed his contract with the club for another year.

On 13 March 2022, Chebbi was appointed as the manager of Al-Sahel.

On 7 October 2022, Chebbi was appointed as the manager of Al-Kholood, replacing Khalid Al-Koroni.

On 3 December 2023, Chebbi returned to manage Al-Qaisumah for the second time.

On 20 August 2024, Chebbi was appointed as manager of Abha for the second time.

On 29 December 2025, Chebbi was appointed as manager of Al-Jandal.

== Managerial statistics ==
As of match played 30 May 2025

Managerial record by team and tenure
| Team | Nat | From | To | Record | | | | | | | |
| Team | Nat | From | To | G | W | D | L | GF | GA | GD | Win % |
|---|---|---|---|---|---|---|---|---|---|---|---|
| Al-Jabalain | (Saudi Arabia) | 28 December 2004 | 14 April 2006 | 50 | 16 | 17 | 17 | 52 | 56 | −4 | 32.00 |
| Al-Ansar | (Saudi Arabia) | 29 April 2006 | 23 February 2007 | 24 | 9 | 7 | 8 | 42 | 34 | +8 | 37.50 |
| Al-Jabalain | (Saudi Arabia) | 7 March 2007 | 29 May 2007 | 11 | 4 | 3 | 4 | 12 | 13 | −1 | 36.36 |
| Al-Faisaly | (Saudi Arabia) | 10 November 2007 | 16 February 2008 | 9 | 2 | 1 | 6 | 6 | 11 | −5 | 22.22 |
| Al-Qadsiah | (Saudi Arabia) | 3 October 2008 | 12 May 2009 | 33 | 18 | 12 | 3 | 54 | 21 | +33 | 54.55 |
| Al-Taawoun | (Saudi Arabia) | 31 May 2009 | 1 January 2010 | 14 | 6 | 4 | 4 | 15 | 13 | +2 | 42.86 |
| Al-Khaleej | (Saudi Arabia) | 5 January 2011 | 16 May 2011 | 20 | 9 | 5 | 6 | 30 | 23 | +7 | 45.00 |
| Al-Watani | (Saudi Arabia) | 22 October 2011 | 20 March 2012 | 20 | 9 | 3 | 8 | 20 | 23 | −3 | 45.00 |
| ES Hammam-Sousse | (Tunisia) | 26 November 2012 | 10 January 2013 | 4 | 1 | 3 | 0 | 2 | 1 | +1 | 25.00 |
| Sdoos | (Saudi Arabia) | 6 February 2013 | 30 May 2013 | 13 | 4 | 4 | 5 | 16 | 16 | +0 | 30.77 |
| Al-Qadsiah | (Saudi Arabia) | 7 August 2013 | 11 February 2014 | 24 | 10 | 9 | 5 | 30 | 19 | +11 | 41.67 |
| Al-Wehda | (Saudi Arabia) | 28 February 2014 | 5 April 2014 | 6 | 2 | 3 | 1 | 9 | 6 | +3 | 33.33 |
| Al-Fayha | (Saudi Arabia) | 13 November 2014 | 30 April 2015 | 19 | 8 | 3 | 8 | 22 | 25 | −3 | 42.11 |
| Al-Riyadh | (Saudi Arabia) | 18 December 2015 | 30 April 2016 | 17 | 5 | 6 | 6 | 23 | 25 | −2 | 29.41 |
| Al-Qaisumah | (Saudi Arabia) | 29 November 2016 | 23 April 2018 | 51 | 19 | 10 | 22 | 86 | 94 | −8 | 37.25 |
| Abha | (Saudi Arabia) | 13 June 2018 | 1 June 2021 | 107 | 45 | 24 | 38 | 148 | 148 | +0 | 42.06 |
| Al-Sahel | (Saudi Arabia) | 13 March 2022 | 31 May 2022 | 11 | 4 | 2 | 5 | 14 | 11 | +3 | 36.36 |
| Al-Kholood | (Saudi Arabia) | 7 October 2022 | 31 May 2023 | 28 | 10 | 6 | 12 | 27 | 25 | +2 | 35.71 |
| Al-Qaisumah | (Saudi Arabia) | 3 December 2023 | 24 April 2024 | 18 | 5 | 3 | 10 | 22 | 28 | −6 | 27.78 |
| Abha | (Saudi Arabia) | 20 August 2024 | 1 June 2025 | 35 | 12 | 12 | 11 | 48 | 51 | −3 | 34.29 |
| Al-Jandal | (Saudi Arabia) | 29 December 2025 | | 0 | 0 | 0 | 0 | 0 | 0 | +0 | — |
| Total | | | | 514 | 198 | 137 | 179 | 678 | 643 | +35 | 38.52 |

== Honours ==
=== Player ===
Étoile du Sahel

- Tunisian Ligue Professionnelle 1: 1985–86, 1986–87
- Tunisian Cup: 1980–81, 1982–83
- Tunisian Super Cup: 1986, 1987

=== Manager ===
Al-Qadsiah

- Saudi First Division: 2008–09

Abha

- MS League: 2018–19

Individual

- Saudi Professional League Manager of the Month: March 2020
