= Mehdi Tahrat =

Footballer (born 1990)

Mehdi Tahrat مهدي طاهرت
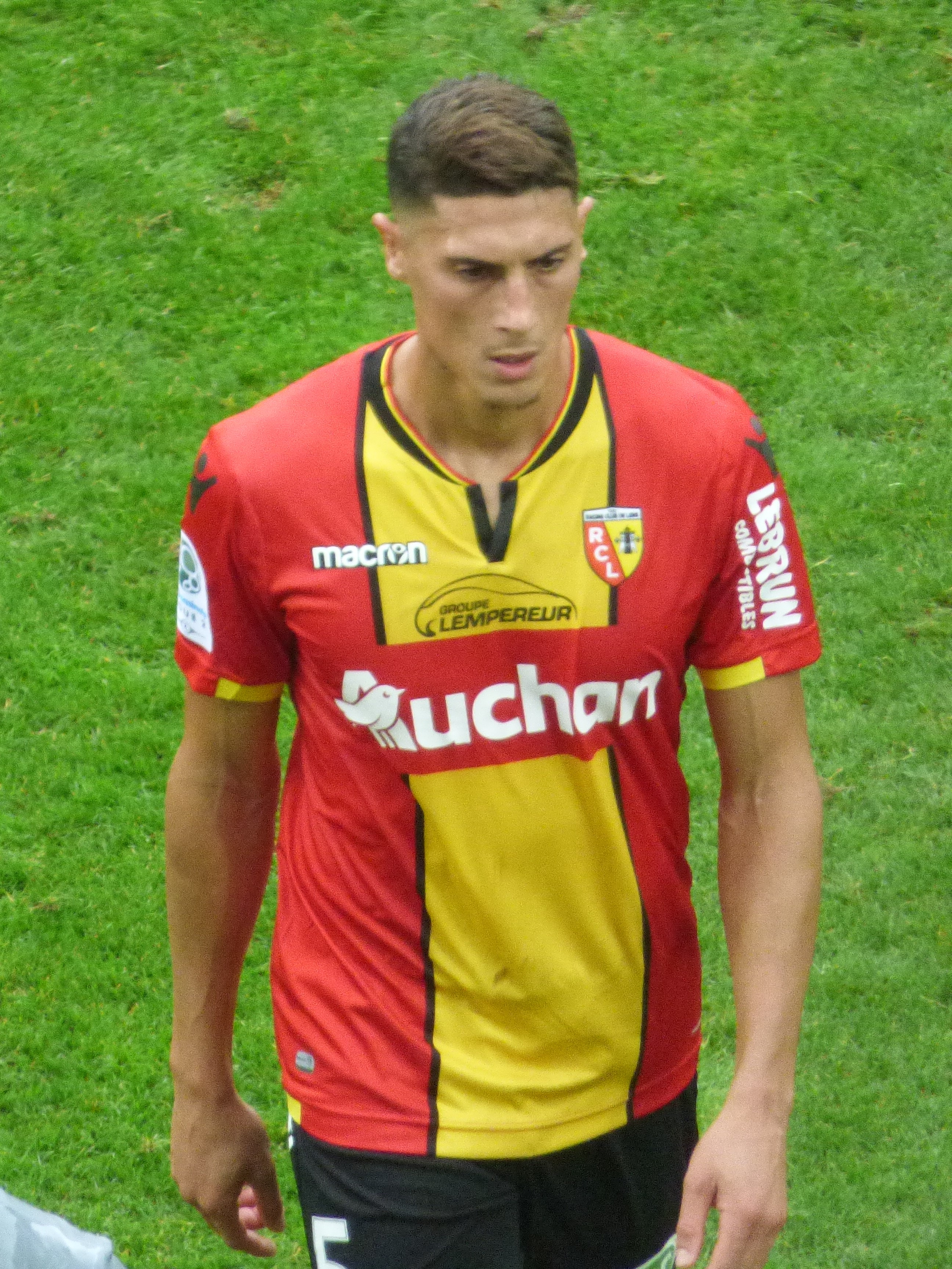
- Tahrat with Lens in 2018

Personal information
- Full name: Mehdi Serge Jean Tahrat
- Date of birth: 24 January 1990 (age 36)
- Place of birth: Meudon, France
- Height: 1.93 m (6 ft 4 in)
- Positions: Centre-back; defensive midfielder

Team information
- Current team: Kanchanaburi Power
- Number: 91

Youth career
- 2008–2009: Évry FC

Senior career*
Years	Team	Apps	(Gls)
2009–2012	Sainte-Geneviève	62	(2)
2012–2014	Lille B	62	(2)
2014–2016	Paris FC	67	(6)
2016	Red Star	5	(0)
2016–2018	Angers	14	(0)
2018	→ Valenciennes (loan)	19	(1)
2018–2019	Lens	19	(2)
2019–2021	Abha	50	(3)
2021–2023	Al Gharafa	39	(4)
2023–2025	Troyes	28	(0)
2025–2026	Kanchanaburi Power	21	(1)

International career^{‡}
2015–	Algeria	15	(0)
Medal record
Men's football
Representing Algeria
FIFA Arab Cup
Winner	2021 Qatar
Africa Cup of Nations
Winner	2019 Egypt
- * Club domestic league appearances and goals as of 3 August 2025 ‡ National team caps and goals as of 21:33, 26 July 2019 (UTC)

Mehdi Jean Tahrat (Arabic :مهدي طاهرت; Born Mehdi Serge Jean; 24 January 1990) is a professional footballer who plays as a centre-back and defensive midfielder for Thai League 1 club Kanchanaburi Power. Born in France, he plays for the Algeria national team.

== Club career ==
In July 2014, after playing for Lille's reserve team in the Championnat de France Amateur, Tahrat signed with Championnat National side Paris FC.

In January 2018, he left Angers to join Valenciennes on loan for the rest of the season.

On 12 September 2023, Tahrat signed for Ligue 2 club Troyes on a contract until the end of the season, with an option for a further year.

On 26 July 2025, Tahrat joined newly-promoted Thai League 1 club Kanchanaburi Power.

== International career ==
In September 2015, Tahrat was called up to the Algeria national team for the first time for a pair of friendlies against Guinea and Senegal.

== Career statistics ==
=== International ===
As of matches played on 26 July 2019

Algeria
Year	Apps	Goals
2015	2	0
2016	0	0
2017	0	0
2018	4	0
2019	3	0
2020	2	0
Total	11	0

== Honours ==
Algeria

- Africa Cup of Nations: 2019
- FIFA Arab Cup: 2021
