= Karim Aouadhi =

Tunisian footballer (born 1986)

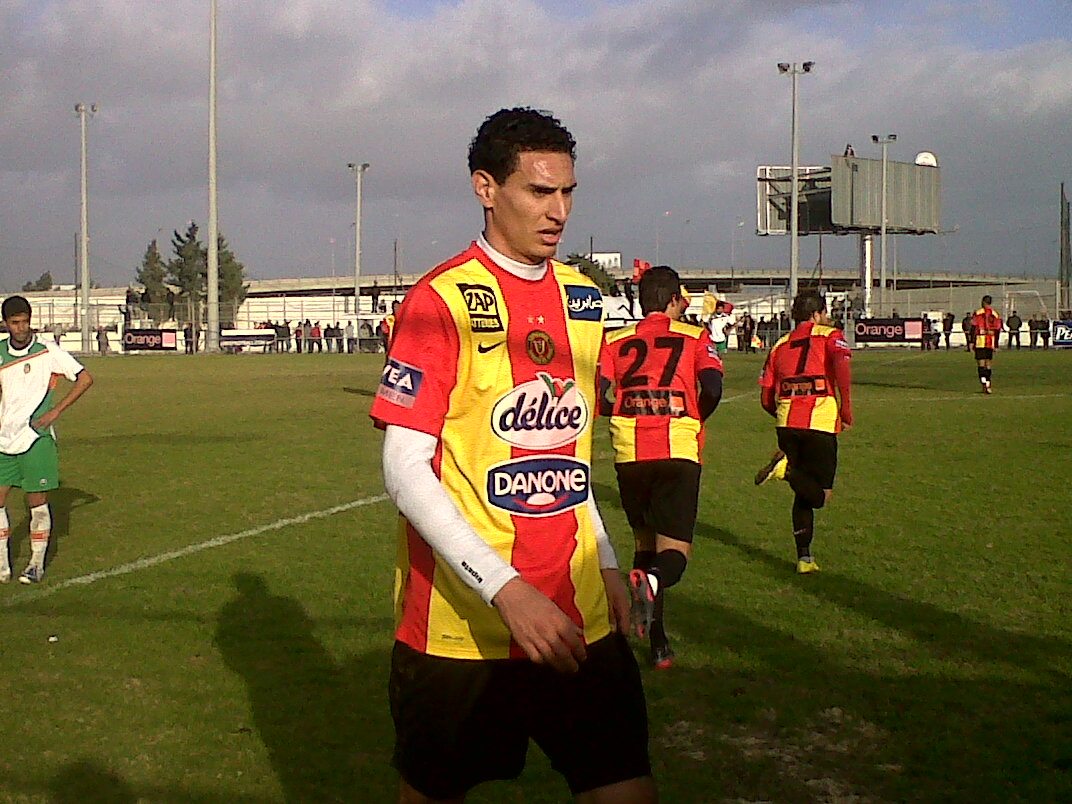
- Aouadhi in 2012

Personal information
- Full name: Karim Ben Hassan Aouadhi
- Date of birth: 2 May 1986 (age 40)
- Place of birth: Mégrine, Tunisia
- Height: 1.93 m (6 ft 4 in)
- Position: Defensive midfielder

Youth career
- AS Mégrine

Senior career*
Years	Team	Apps	(Gls)
2004–2007	AS Mégrine	36	(8)
2007–2011	Club Africain	49	(14)
2008–2009	→ Al-Wahda (loan)	19	(5)
2011	Fortuna Düsseldorf	1	(0)
2012–2014	Espérance	36	(5)
2014–2015	Stade Tunisien	36	(7)
2015–2018	CS Sfaxien	61	(10)
2018–2019	Étoile du Sahel	22	(3)
2019–2021	Abha	50	(7)

International career
2015–2019	Tunisia	11	(1)
- * Club domestic league appearances and goals as of 20:01, 9 September 2020 (UTC)

Karim Ben Hassan Aouadhi (Arabic: كريم العواضي; born 2 May 1986) is a Tunisian professional footballer who plays as a defensive midfielder. He made 11 appearances for the Tunisia national team scoring once.

== Career ==
Born in Mégrine, Aouadhi was formed at AS Mégrine and joined in 2007 Club Africain.

On 5 September 2008, Aouadhi moved on loan to UAE League club Al-Wahda until June 2009 for 250 million dinars.

On 7 April 2011, he signed a two-year contract for German club Fortuna Düsseldorf, but the contract was terminated by both sides for reason of language problems on 27 December 2011.

After a short spell with CS Sfaxien, he joined Étoile du Sahel in July 2018.

== Career statistics ==
Appearances and goals by national team and year
National team	Year	Apps	Goals
Tunisia	2015	6	1
Tunisia	2016	2	0
Tunisia	2017	1	0
Tunisia	2018	0	0
Tunisia	2019	2	0
Total		11	1

Scores and results list Tunisia's goal tally first, score column indicates score after each Aouadhi goal.

List of international goals scored by Karim Aouadhi
No.	Date	Venue	Opponent	Score	Result	Competition
1	15 June 2015	Stade Mohamed V, Casablanca, Morocco	Morocco	1–0	1–1	2016 African Nations Championship qualification

== Honours ==
Club Africain

- Tunisian League: 2007–08
