= Karam Barnawi =

Saudi football player

Personal information
- Full name: Karam Ibrahim Mohammed Barnawi
- Date of birth: October 6, 1987 (age 39)
- Place of birth: Saudi Arabia
- Height: 1.68 m (5 ft 6 in)
- Position: Right-back

Youth career
- Al-Ansar

Senior career*
| Years | Team | Apps | (Gls) |
| 2007–2008 | Al-Ansar | | |
| 2008–2010 | Al-Ahli | 2 | (0) |
| 2010–2011 | Najran | 14 | (0) |
| 2011–2014 | Ohod | | |
| 2014–2016 | Al-Fayha | | |
| 2016–2018 | Al-Kawkab | | |
| 2018–2022 | Abha | 79 | (2) |
| 2022–2024 | Al-Ain | 24 | (0) |
- * Club domestic league appearances and goals as of 1 August 2022

Karam Barnawi (Arabic: كرم برناوي; born October 6, 1987) is a Saudi Arabian footballer who currently plays as a right-back.

== Honours ==
Al-Kawkab

- Saudi Second Division: 2016–17

Abha

- MS League: 2018–19
