= Abha Club =

Association football club in Abha, Saudi Arabia

Abha
- Full name: Abha Club
- Nickname: Zaeem Al-Janoub (The Leaders of the South)
- Founded: 1966; 60 years ago, as Al-Farouk; 1972; 54 years ago, as Al-Wadiea; 1999; 27 years ago, as Abha.
- Ground: Prince Sultan bin Abdulaziz Sports City; Abha, Saudi Arabia
- Capacity: 25,000
- Owner: Abdulaziz bin Turki bin Talal Al-Saud
- Chairman: Saad Al-Ahmari
- Head coach: Teo Pirija
- League: Saudi Pro League
- 2025–26: FDL, 1st out of 18
- Website: abhafc.sa

Abha Football Club (Arabic: نادي أبها) is a professional Saudi football club based in Abha that are currently playing in the Saudi Pro League.

They were first promoted to the top flight in 2005 when they finished as runners up in the First Division. However, they were relegated after just one season. They achieved their second promotion in 2008 when they also finished as runners up. During the 2018–19 season Abha won their first First Division title as well as promotion to the Pro League for the third in the club's history. Abha have won the Saudi Third Division League once, during the 1998–99 season and the Saudi Second Division League once, during the 1999–2000 season.

The club play their home games at Prince Sultan bin Abdulaziz Sports City (also known as Al-Mahalah) in Abha. They share the stadium with rivals Damac, with whom they contest the Asir derby.

== History ==
The idea of establishing a sports club in Abha started with the personal initiative of Abdullah Al-Muallami in 1947. His reasons for establishing a sports club was so that the youth of Abha had a place to practice and play football. The youth of Abha continued practicing without an official sports club until the year of 1960. Then the idea of establishing a sports club was put in motion. The aim of establishing a sports club wasn't only a sport-related one; it was also aimed to be an educational and sociable club. A meeting was held on this topic, and the attendees agreed to establish a sports club in Abha. However, a problem arose in the meeting which caused a split between the attendees. The cause of the split was the naming of the club. One half wanted the club's name to be Al-Ahli Club in Asir the other half wanted the name to be Ittihad Shabab Asir. An agreement was not reached and eventually, two clubs were established in Abha. And in the year 1966, the club was officially registered with the GSA under the name of Al-Farouk Sports Club in Abha. The club's first official president was Mohammed bin Ibrahim Al-Nuaami who changed the club's name from Al-Ahli Sports Club to Al-Farouk Sports Club.

During the same time, Al-Ittihad Sports Club in Abha was formed and the first official president was Aziz bin Mustafa. Under directives from the GSA, Al-Ittihad Sports Club changed their name to Abha Sports Club in 1962. This was due to a club already named Al-Ittihad Sports Club in Jeddah. And in the year of 1968, Abha Sports Club once again changed their name but this time to Al-Siddiq Sports Club, in commemoration to Abu Bakr, first of the Rashidun Caliphates. In early 1969, the GSA decided to merge both clubs, Al-Farouk and Al-Siddiq, to form one club under the name of Al-Farouk Sports Club. Sheikh Suleiman bin Ahmed Mimish was the first president of the newly merged club.

In 1972, Al-Farouk Sports Club held a ceremony in honor of Prince Khalid bin Faisal Al Saud on the occasion of his appointment as the governor of Asir. The ceremony was held at the club's headquarters and a number of matters which concern the club were discussed. One of the matters that were discussed was a name change proposed by the Prince to members of the club's board. It was unanimously agreed by members of the board and fans of the club to change the club's name to Al-Wadiea Sports Club. Al-Wadiea achieved promotion to the Saudi First Division for the first time in 1977. They spent two seasons in the First Division before being relegated to the regional leagues. In 1983, the club once again achieved promotion to the First Division and spent two seasons before being relegated at the end of the 1984–85 season. Al-Wadiea were once again promoted in 1994 before being relegated after a season. In 1999, the club changed their name from Al-Wadiea Sports Club to Abha Sports Club. That same year, the club was promoted to the Second Division under the guidance of Saad Saleh Al-Bishri as manager. A year later the club achieved promotion once again but this time to the First Division with the Algerian, Elias Bou Zaid, as manager. In 2005, Abha were promoted to the Pro League, the top tier of Saudi football, for the first time after finishing second in the 2004–05 season. The club were relegated after just a season in the top tier. Abha once again reached the Pro League after finishing second in the 2007–08 season. They were relegated after a season following their loss to Al-Raed in the relegation play-offs. Abha then spent six consecutive seasons in the Saudi First Division before getting relegated to the Second Division for the first time since 2000. On 4 May 2018, Abha defeated Al-Watani 2–1 on aggregate in the promotion play-offs to earn promotion to the second tier. On 30 April 2019, Abha were promoted to the top flight for the third time after a 2–2 draw away to Al-Nojoom. This was their second promotion in two seasons, becoming the sixth Saudi team to achieve this feat. On 11 May 2019, Abha won their first MS League title despite losing to Al-Qaisumah. The 2019–20 season was Abha's most successful season in the Pro League. They achieved their highest finish in the top flight after finishing ninth. The club also reached the semi-finals of the King Cup for the first time.

=== Recent seasons ===
Season		Pos.	Pl.	W	D	L	GS	GA	P	King Cup	Crown Prince Cup	Federation Cup	Notes
2001–02	2D	5th	18	8	4	6	27	25	28	–	Round of 16	Group stage	
2002–03	2D	5th	22	9	8	5	38	34	35	–	Round of 16	Group stage	
2003–04	2D	6th	22	7	7	8	34	27	28	–	3rd qualifying round	Winners	
2004–05	2D	2nd	26	13	8	5	54	31	47	–	1st qualifying round	Semi-finals	Promoted
2005–06	1D	11th	22	3	4	15	24	57	13	–	Round of 16	Semi-finals	Relegated
2006–07	2D	10th	26	8	7	11	35	46	31	–	2nd qualifying round	Quarter-finals	
2007–08	2D	2nd	26	13	6	7	47	37	45	–	2nd qualifying round	Semi-finals	Promoted
2008–09	1D	11th	22	4	7	11	19	40	19	–	Round of 16	Group stage	Relegated
2009–10	2D	4th	26	12	5	9	39	36	41	–	2nd qualifying round	Quarter-finals	
2010–11	2D	4th	30	13	12	5	59	43	51	–	3rd qualifying round	–	
2011–12	2D	4th	30	14	7	9	36	28	49	–	1st qualifying round	–	
2012–13	2D	8th	30	11	8	11	41	45	41	–	Play-off round	–	
2013–14	2D	10th	30	9	12	9	41	40	39	Round of 16	Round of 32	–	
2014–15	2D	15th	30	5	10	15	36	56	25	Round of 16	Round of 32	–	Relegated
2015–16	3D	7th	18	4	8	6	19	24	20	Round of 32	–	–	
2016–17	3D	7th	18	4	8	6	14	15	20	1st qualifying round	–	–	
2017–18	3D	4th	18	7	6	5	20	22	27	1st qualifying round	–	–	Promoted
2018–19	2D	1st	38	19	12	7	52	38	69	Round of 16	–	–	Promoted
2019–20	1D	9th	30	11	5	14	41	52	38	Semi-finals	–	–	
2020–21	1D	13th	30	10	6	14	42	50	36	Round of 16	–	–	
2021–22	1D	9th	30	9	8	13	27	43	35	Round of 16	–	–	
2022–23	1D	12th	30	10	3	17	33	52	33	Quarter-finals	–	–	
2023–24	1D	16th	34	9	5	20	38	87	32	Quarter-finals	–	–	Relegated
2024–25	2D	8th	34	12	12	10	48	51	48	Round of 32	–	–	
2025–26	2D	1st	34	24	5	5	68	41	77	Round of 32	–	–	Promoted

== Honours ==
- Saudi First Division League
  - Winners (3): 1971–72, 2018–19, 2025–26
  - Runners-up (2): 2004–05, 2007–08
- Saudi Second Division League
  - Winners (2): 1993–94, 1999–2000
  - Runners-up (2): 1981–82, 1982–83
- Saudi Third Division
  - Winners (1): 1998–99
- Prince Faisal bin Fahd Cup for Division 1 and 2 Teams
  - Winners (1): 2003–04

== Current squad ==
As of 17 August 2026 Note: Flags indicate national team as defined under FIFA eligibility rules; some limited exceptions apply. Players may hold more than one non-FIFA nationality.

No.	Pos.	Nation	Player
3	DF	CUW	Juriën Gaari
4	MF	KSA	Basil Al-Sayyali (on loan from Al-Shabab)
5	DF	KSA	Muayad Bunayan
6	MF	KSA	Faisal Al-Subiani (on loan from Al-Shabab)
7	MF	KSA	Firas Al-Ghamdi
8	MF	KSA	Nasser Al-Daajani
9	FW	FRA	Kamil Boumedmed
10	MF	FRA	Nabil Fekir
11	FW	FRA	Alimami Gory
12	DF	KSA	Khaled Al-Shamrani (on loan from Al-Ula)
14	FW	CMR	Kévin Nkoudou (on loan from Diriyah)
16	GK	GUF	Donovan Léon
17	MF	KSA	Abdulkarim Darisi (on loan from Al-Hilal)
18	MF	KSA	Mohammed Al Hamsal
19	DF	KSA	Abdullah Al-Fahad

No.	Pos.	Nation	Player
20	FW	KSA	Keshim Al-Qahtani (on loan from Al-Taawoun)
21	GK	KSA	Abdulrahman Al-Bouq
22	DF	SEN	Abdou Diallo
23	DF	KSA	Mohammed Al-Dossari
26	GK	KSA	Mustafa Malayekah
28	MF	KSA	Bader Al-Mutairi
29	MF	KSA	Majed Dawran
32	MF	FRA	Loreintz Rosier
37	DF	KSA	Abdulbassit Hindi
39	MF	KSA	Mohammed Al-Zaid
44	FW	BEL	Michy Batshuayi
55	MF	ARG	Mateo Borrell (on loan from Al-Ittihad)
66	DF	KSA	Nawaf Al-Ghulaimish
80	DF	KSA	Safwan Al-Johani
95	MF	KSA	Ali Mubarki

=== Out on loan ===
Note: Flags indicate national team as defined under FIFA eligibility rules; some limited exceptions apply. Players may hold more than one non-FIFA nationality.

No.	Pos.	Nation	Player
—	DF	KSA	Yasser Yaqoub (at Al-Ula)

== Coaching staff ==
Position	Name
Head coach	(Croatia) Teo Pirija
Assistant coach	(Croatia) Marijo Osibov (Saudi Arabia) Osama Al-shehri
Goalkeeper coach	(Portugal) Paulo Andre
Fitness coach	(Croatia) Šimun Caktas (Saudi Arabia) Faisal Al-Marzouq
Performance analyst	(Croatia) Vedran Kukoč
Video analyst	(Saudi Arabia) Mohammed Al-Hussin
Match analyst	(Saudi Arabia) Hussein Al-Kheybari
Doctor	(Saudi Arabia) Faisal Al-Mussalam
Physiotherapist	(Saudi Arabia) Isa Al-Hahbrani
Director of football	(Saudi Arabia) Fawzi Al-Marzouq
Technical Director	(Saudi Arabia) Turki Al-Hussein

== Managerial history ==
- (Sudan) Hassan Khairi (1971 – 1972)
- (Egypt) Hosni Matar (1982 – 1985)
- (Tunisia) Wajdi Essid (1997 – 1998)
- (Saudi Arabia) Saad Al-Beshri (1998 – 1999)
- (Algeria) Elias Bou Zaid (1999 – 2000)
- (Saudi Arabia) Saad Al-Beshri (2000 – 2001)
- (Romania) Constantin Pascal (October 11, 2001 – January 5, 2002)
- (Algeria) Boualem Laroum (January 5, 2002 – May 30, 2002)
- (Brazil) João Alves (July 1, 2002 – May 30, 2004)
- (Saudi Arabia) Saad Al-Beshri (August 1, 2004 – February 18, 2005)
- (Tunisia) Yousef Al Suryati (February 18, 2005 – October 15, 2005)
- (Saudi Arabia) Saad Al-Beshri (October 15, 2005 – December 2, 2005)
- (Brazil) José Kleber (December 2, 2005 – March 24, 2006)
- (Saudi Arabia) Saad Al-Beshri (March 24, 2006 – April 30, 2006)
- (Brazil) Carlos Dante (May 24, 2006 – January 16, 2007)
- (Tunisia) Mourad Okbi (January 21, 2007 – May 30, 2007)
- (Morocco) Abdelkader Youmir (August 22, 2007 – October 18, 2008)
- (Saudi Arabia) Saad Al-Beshri (October 18, 2008 – November 1, 2008)
- (Morocco) Idris Obeis (November 1, 2008 – November 22, 2009)
- (Tunisia) Nasser Nefzi (November 18, 2009 – April 27, 2010)
- (Czech Republic) Otakar Dolejš (July 1, 2010 – October 1, 2011)
- (Tunisia) Zuhair Al Louti (October 1, 2011 – May 28, 2012)
- (Egypt) Emad Soliman (May 28, 2012 – November 17, 2012)
- (Portugal) José Rachão (November 24, 2012 – March 23, 2013)
- (Saudi Arabia) Ibrahim Al-Aasmi (March 23, 2013 – June 1, 2013)
- (Czech Republic) Otakar Dolejš (July 1, 2013 – September 14, 2014)
- (Italy) Riccardo De Vivo (September 26, 2014 – March 25, 2015)
- (Tunisia) Jamal Belhadi (February 19, 2015 – March 25, 2015)
- (Saudi Arabia) Ibrahim Al-Aasmi (March 25, 2015 – May 1, 2015)
- (Tunisia) Yousri bin Kahla (August 1, 2015 – November 15, 2015)
- (Tunisia) Karim Dalhoum (November 26, 2015 – March 1, 2016)
- (Tunisia) Lotfi El Hashmi (June 29, 2016 – January 14, 2017)
- (Saudi Arabia) Ibrahim Al-Aasmi (January 14, 2017 – May 1, 2017)
- (Tunisia) Mounir Hariz (April 16, 2017 – December 18, 2017)
- (Saudi Arabia) Ibrahim Al-Aasmi (December 18, 2017 – January 28, 2018)
- (Saudi Arabia) Ahmed Mehrez (January 28, 2018 – May 10, 2018)
- (Tunisia) Abderrazek Chebbi (June 14, 2018 – June 1, 2021)
- (Slovakia) Martin Ševela (July 1, 2021 – June 30, 2022)
- (Belgium) Sven Vandenbroeck (July 16, 2022 – October 8, 2022)
- (Poland) Mateusz Łajczak (caretaker) (October 8, 2022 – October 30, 2022)
- (Netherlands) Roel Coumans (October 30, 2022 – June 1, 2023)
- (Poland) Czesław Michniewicz (June 12, 2023 – October 1, 2023)
- (Romania) George Timis (caretaker) (October 1, 2023 – October 9, 2023)
- (Tunisia) Yousef Al Mannai (October 9, 2023 – December 17, 2023)
- (Romania) George Timis (caretaker) (December 17, 2023 – January 26, 2024)
- (South Africa) Pitso Mosimane (January 26, 2024 – June 1, 2024)
- (Tunisia) Abderrazek Chebbi (August 20, 2024 – June 1, 2025)
- (Croatia) Damir Burić (August 1, 2025 – October 28, 2026)
- (Croatia) Teo Pirija (October 28, 2026 – )

== Presidential history ==
As of 17 November 2023.

No	Name	From	To
1	(Saudi Arabia) Mohammed Al-Nuaami	1966	1968
2	(Saudi Arabia) Ahmed Mottain	1968	1968
3	(Saudi Arabia) Suleiman Habtar	1969	1970
4	(Saudi Arabia) Aziz bin Mustafa Aziz	1970	1972
5	(Saudi Arabia) Suleiman Mimish	1972	1973
6	(Saudi Arabia) Dhafer Al-Obaidi	1973	1974
7	(Saudi Arabia) Mohammed bin Rashed Salamah	1977	1977
8	(Saudi Arabia) Khaled Mohammed Sheikho	1978	1978
9	(Saudi Arabia) Mohammed Al-Fawaz	1979	1979
10	(Saudi Arabia) Abdulrahman Abo Melha	1981	1984
11	(Saudi Arabia) Hani Abu Ghazaleh	1985	1987
12	(Saudi Arabia) Saleh Qadeh	1988	1990
13	(Saudi Arabia) Mustafa bin Abdullah Aziz	1991	1993
14	(Saudi Arabia) Hamad Shabib Al-Dossari	1993	1996
15	(Saudi Arabia) Abdulwahab Al Mojathel	1997	2002
16	(Saudi Arabia) Hamad Shabib Al-Dossari	2002	2005
17	(Saudi Arabia) Abdulwahab Al Mojathel	2005	2006
18	(Saudi Arabia) Meshafi Al-Maqrafi	2006	2006
19	(Saudi Arabia) Ali Al-Shehri	2006	2006
20	(Saudi Arabia) Abdulrahman bin Mohammed Faisal	2006	2008
21	(Saudi Arabia) Saad Al-Ahmari	2008	2008
22	(Saudi Arabia) Abdulwahab Al Mojathel	2009	2009
23	(Saudi Arabia) Saad Al-Ahmari	2010	2013
24	(Saudi Arabia) Ahmed Al-Hodithy	2013	2025
25	(Saudi Arabia) Saad Al-Ahmari	2025

== See also ==
- List of football clubs in Saudi Arabia
