= 2017–18 Al-Faisaly FC season =

Al-Faisaly
2017–18 season
- President: Fahd Al-Medlej
- Manager: Vuk Rašović
- Stadium: King Salman Sport City Stadium
- SPL: 6th
- King Cup: Runners-up
- Crown Prince Cup: Round of 16
- Top goalscorer: League: Islam Seraj; Luisinho (7 goals each); All: Rogério (9 goals)
- Highest home attendance: 2,316 vs Al-Fayha (14 October 2017)
- Lowest home attendance: 275 vs Al-Ettifaq (30 September 2017)
- Average home league attendance: 972
Home colours	Away colours
- All statistics correct as of 12 May 2018.

The 2017–18 season was Al-Faisaly's 8th consecutive season in Pro League, the top flight of Saudi Arabian football, and their 64th year in existence. Along with the Pro League, the club also competed in the Crown Prince Cup and the King Cup.

The season covered the period from 1 July 2017 to 30 June 2018.

== Players ==
=== Squad information ===
As of 10 February 2018

Note: Flags indicate national team as defined under FIFA eligibility rules; some limited exceptions apply. Players may hold more than one non-FIFA nationality.

No.	Pos.	Nation	Player
1	GK	KSA	Ibrahim Zaid
2	DF	KSA	Sultan Al-Ghanam
3	DF	BRA	Igor Rossi
4	DF	BRA	Evson Patrício
5	DF	KSA	Mohamed Eid
6	MF	KSA	Omar Abdulaziz (Captain)
7	DF	KSA	Wesam Al-Sowayed
8	MF	BRA	Luisinho
9	FW	BRA	Rogério
10	MF	KSA	Hussain Al-Qahtani
11	MF	KSA	Mansor Hamzi
15	FW	KSA	Islam Seraj (on loan from Al-Ahli)
19	FW	KSA	Mohammed Majrashi
20	MF	KSA	Hamad Al Mansor

No.	Pos.	Nation	Player
23	MF	KSA	Mohammed Abousaban
24	DF	KSA	Jamaan Al-Dossari
26	GK	KSA	Mustafa Malayekah
29	MF	KSA	Fahad Hamad
30	DF	KSA	Saeed Al-Robeai (on loan from Al-Ahli)
31	GK	KSA	Khalid Sharahili
32	GK	KSA	Hatem Al-Johani
33	DF	KSA	Sultan Al-Deayea
45	MF	NGA	Moussa Eisa
47	MF	KSA	Sultan Mendash
74	MF	EGY	Saleh Gomaa (on loan from Al Ahly)
88	MF	TRI	Khaleem Hyland
99	FW	BRA	Zé Eduardo

== Transfers ==
=== In ===
Date	Pos.	Name	Previous club	Fee	Source
12 May 2017	MF	(Saudi Arabia) Hussain Al-Qahtani	(Saudi Arabia) Al-Hilal	Undisclosed	
14 May 2017	DF	(Saudi Arabia) Mohamed Eid	(Saudi Arabia) Al-Nassr	Free	
7 June 2017	MF	(Saudi Arabia) Nader Al-Muwallad	(Saudi Arabia) Al-Shabab	Free	
7 June 2017	DF	(Saudi Arabia) Jamaan Al-Dossari	(Saudi Arabia) Al-Shabab	Free	
10 June 2017	MF	(Saudi Arabia) Hamad Al Mansor	(Saudi Arabia) Najran	Free	
27 June 2017	MF	(Brazil) Luisinho	(Brazil) Bahia	Undisclosed	
9 July 2017	MF	(Trinidad and Tobago) Khaleem Hyland	(Belgium) Westerlo	Free	
10 July 2017	MF	(Saudi Arabia) Sultan Mendash	(Saudi Arabia) Al-Ittihad	Free	
19 July 2017	MF	(Saudi Arabia) Mohammed Abousaban	(Saudi Arabia) Al-Fateh	Undisclosed	
1 August 2017	FW	(Brazil) Rogério	(Thailand) Buriram United	Free	
24 August 2017	FW	(Zimbabwe) Tendai Ndoro	(South Africa) Orlando Pirates	Undisclosed	
25 August 2017	MF	(Saudi Arabia) Fahad Hamad	(Saudi Arabia) Al-Ahli	Free	
12 September 2017	GK	(Saudi Arabia) Khalid Sharahili	(Saudi Arabia) Al-Hilal	Free	
12 September 2017	DF	(Saudi Arabia) Sultan Al-Deayea	(Saudi Arabia) Al-Shabab	Free	
10 January 2018	MF	(Saudi Arabia) Moussa Eisa	Unattached	Free	
26 January 2018	DF	(Brazil) Evson Patrício	(Japan) Kamatamare Sanuki	Free	
31 January 2018	FW	(Brazil) Zé Eduardo	(Brazil) Vitória	Free	

=== Loans in ===
Date	Pos.	Name	Parent club	End date	Source
1 August 2017	DF	(Saudi Arabia) Saeed Al-Robeai	(Saudi Arabia) Al-Ahli	End of season	
23 August 2017	FW	(Saudi Arabia) Islam Seraj	(Saudi Arabia) Al-Ahli	End of season	
31 January 2018	MF	(Egypt) Saleh Gomaa	(Egypt) Al Ahly	End of season	

=== Out ===
Date	Pos.	Name	New club	Fee	Source
14 June 2017	MF	(Saudi Arabia) Fahad Al-Rashidi	(Saudi Arabia) Al-Raed	Free	
20 June 2017	MF	(Saudi Arabia) Abdullah Al-Mutairi	(Saudi Arabia) Al-Fayha	Free	
22 June 2017	MF	(Saudi Arabia) Mosaab Al-Otaibi	(Saudi Arabia) Al-Batin	Free	
27 June 2017	DF	(Saudi Arabia) Mohammed Salem	(Saudi Arabia) Al-Shabab	Free	
30 June 2017	DF	(Saudi Arabia) Fawaz Fallatah	(Saudi Arabia) Al-Qadsiah	Free	
7 July 2017	MF	(Saudi Arabia) Salem Al-Khaibari	(Saudi Arabia) Al-Orobah	Free	
8 July 2017	MF	(Saudi Arabia) Hassan Abo Shahin	(Saudi Arabia) Al-Orobah	Free	
16 July 2017	GK	(Saudi Arabia) Suliman Sofyani	(Saudi Arabia) Al-Nojoom	Free	
8 August 2017	DF	(Saudi Arabia) Sami Kassar	(Saudi Arabia) Ohod	Undisclosed	
13 August 2017	MF	(Saudi Arabia) Fahad Al-Saqri	(Saudi Arabia) Al-Tai	Free	
17 August 2017	MF	(Saudi Arabia) Nader Yajazi	(Saudi Arabia) Al-Watani	Free	
9 December 2017	FW	(Romania) Mircea Axente		Released	
5 January 2018	FW	(Zimbabwe) Tendai Ndoro	(South Africa) Ajax Cape Town	Undisclosed	
31 January 2018	DF	(Saudi Arabia) Sultan Al-Bishi	(Saudi Arabia) Al-Khaleej	Free	
4 February 2018	MF	(Saudi Arabia) Ahmad Abbas	(Saudi Arabia) Al-Qaisumah	Free	
10 February 2018	MF	(Saudi Arabia) Nader Al-Muwallad	(Saudi Arabia) Al-Orobah	Free	

=== Loans out ===
Date	Pos.	Name	Subsequent club	End date	Source
11 September 2017	DF	(Saudi Arabia) Fahad Al-Munaif	(Saudi Arabia) Al-Orobah	End of season	
11 September 2017	DF	(Saudi Arabia) Ahmed Al-Najei	(Saudi Arabia) Al-Orobah	End of season	
12 September 2017	FW	(Saudi Arabia) Mohammed Assiri	(Saudi Arabia) Najran	End of season	
28 January 2018	MF	(Saudi Arabia) Omar Al-Sohaymi	(Saudi Arabia) Al-Tai	End of season	
31 January 2018	MF	(Saudi Arabia) Abdullah Awaji	(Saudi Arabia) Al-Watani	End of season	

== Pre-season friendlies ==
14 July 2017 Friendly	Tubize (Belgium)	1–0	(Saudi Arabia) Al-Faisaly	Netherlands
17:15 CEST	79'	Report

22 July 2017 Friendly	Cappellen (Belgium)	1–2	(Saudi Arabia) Al-Faisaly	Antwerp, Belgium
15:00 CEST	25'	Report	57'; Mendash 86'

4 August 2017 Friendly	Al-Faisaly (Saudi Arabia)	2–1	(Saudi Arabia) Al-Batin	Al Majma'ah, Saudi Arabia
19:30 AST	Al-Ghanam 90'; Al-Mansor 90+1'	Report	Jorge Santos 46'	Stadium: King Salman Sport City Stadium

== Competitions ==
=== Pro League ===
==== League table ====
Pos	Team	Pld	W	D	L	GF	GA	GD	Pts
4	Al-Ettifaq	26	10	6	10	37	46	−9	36 (Note: Al-Ettifaq finished ahead of Al-Fateh on head-to-head points: Al-Ettifaq 2–1 Al-Fateh, Al-Fateh 1–1 Al-Ettifaq)
5	Al-Fateh	26	9	9	8	34	39	−5	36
6	Al-Faisaly	26	9	8	9	39	33	+6	35
7	Al-Taawoun	26	9	7	10	43	36	+7	34 (Note: Al-Taawoun finished ahead of Al-Fayha on head-to-head points: Al-Fayha 1–1 Al-Taawoun, Al-Taawoun 4–0 Al-Fayha)
8	Al-Fayha	26	8	10	8	36	40	−4	34

Updated to match(es) played on 12 April 2018. Source: slstat.com
Rules for classification: 1) Points; 2) Head-to-head points; 3) Head-to-head goal difference; 4) Total goal difference; 5) Total goals scored; 6) Play-off (only for deciding champion, relegation and AFC competitions participation).

==== Results summary ====
Overall								Home						Away					
Pld	W	D	L	GF	GA	GD	Pts	W	D	L	GF	GA	GD	W	D	L	GF	GA	GD
26	9	8	9	39	33	+6	35	5	3	5	18	16	+2	4	5	4	21	17	+4

Last updated: 12 April 2018.
Source: Competitive matches

==== Results by round ====
Round	1	2	3	4	5	6	7	8	9	10	11	12	13	14	15	16	17	18	19	20	21	22	23	24	25	26
Ground	H	A	H	A	H	H	A	H	A	H	A	H	A	A	H	A	H	A	A	H	A	H	A	H	A	H
Result	L	W	W	D	W	W	L	L	W	W	D	L	W	D	D	D	W	D	D	L	L	W	L	L	L	D
Position	13	9	3	4	4	3	5	4	3	4	3	4	4	4	4	4	3	3	3	4	4	3	4	5	6	6

Updated to match(es) played on 12 April 2018. Source: Competitive matches
A = Away; H = Home; W = Win; D = Draw; L = Loss

==== Matches ====
All times are local, AST (UTC+3).

Win Draw Loss Postponed

12 August 2017 1	Al-Faisaly	1–3	Al-Nassr	Al Majma'ah
20:55	Al-Sowayed (yellow card) 38'; Hamzi 69'; Al-Robeai (red card) 90+4'	Report	Al-Sahlawi 20'; Al-Shehri 23'; Al-Jumaiah 34'; Al-Shonaishni (yellow card) 82'; Al-Fraidi (yellow card) 84'; Sharahili (yellow card) 90+4'	Stadium: King Salman Sport City Stadium; Attendance: 892; Referee: Abdulrahman Al-Sultan

17 August 2017 2	Al-Raed	2–3	Al-Faisaly	Buraidah
19:20	Al-Rashidi 45+2'; Al-Shamekh (yellow card) 76'; Bangoura 84'	Report	Abousaban 25'; Majrashi 75'; Luisinho 82'	Stadium: King Abdullah Sport City Stadium; Attendance: 2,191; Referee: Fahad Al-Mirdasi

15 September 2017 3	Al-Faisaly	2–1	Al-Ittihad	Al Majma'ah
20:25	Luisinho 49' (pen.); Abousaban 68'	Report	Fallatah 18', (yellow card) 67'; Khaled Al-Sumairi (yellow card) 86'	Stadium: King Salman Sport City Stadium; Attendance: 751; Referee: Mohammed Al-Hoaish

23 September 2017 4	Al-Qadsiah	1–1	Al-Faisaly	Khobar
18:15	Fatau (yellow card) 23'; Al-Obaid (yellow card) 39'; Bismark 64'; Masrahi (yellow card) 90+4'	Report	Luisinho 49' (pen.); Abousaban (yellow card) 61'; Abdulaziz (yellow card) 79'	Stadium: Prince Saud bin Jalawi Stadium; Attendance: 929; Referee: Mohammed Al-Qarni

30 September 2017 5	Al-Faisaly	3–0	Al-Ettifaq	Al Majma'ah
18:30	Hamzi 14'; Abdulaziz (yellow card) 45+1', (goal) 59'; Majrashi (yellow card) 45+2'; Seraj 90+3'	Report		Stadium: King Salman Sport City Stadium; Attendance: 275; Referee: Khaled Al-Teris

14 October 2017 6	Al-Faisaly	2–1	Al-Fayha	Al Majma'ah
20:00	Hyland 41'; Abousaban 59', (yellow card) 75'; Al-Deayea (yellow card) 62'; Al-Dossari (yellow card) 64'; Al-Ghanam (yellow card) 73'	Report	Al-Khaibari (yellow card) 49'; Al-Shammari (yellow card) 51'; Fernández 90+1'	Stadium: King Salman Sport City Stadium; Attendance: 2,316; Referee: Sultan Al-Harbi

20 October 2017 7	Al-Taawoun	1–0	Al-Faisaly	Buraidah
19:55	Al-Zubaidi (yellow card) 69'; Al-Mousa 88'	Report	Luisinho (yellow card) 45'; Hyland (yellow card) 50'; Al-Deayea (yellow card) 79'; Al-Dossari (yellow card) 90+4'	Stadium: King Abdullah Sport City Stadium; Attendance: 2,877; Referee: Abdullah Al-Nuhait

26 October 2017 8	Al-Faisaly	1–2	Al-Ahli	Al Majma'ah
19:50	Rossi (yellow card) 55'; Abousaban 68'; Hyland (yellow card) 82'; Rogério (yellow card) 85'	Report	Fetfatzidis 59'; Leonardo 84' (pen.)	Stadium: King Salman Sport City Stadium; Attendance: 512; Referee: Turki Al-Khudair

4 November 2017 9	Ohod	1–3	Al-Faisaly	Medina
19:45	Attiyah 36'; Al-Dhaw (yellow card) 75'; Kassar (yellow card) 77'; Ronaldo (yellow card) 89'	Report	Seraj 19', (yellow card) 52'; Abousaban (yellow card) 39'; Luisinho 42' (pen.); Rossi 48', (yellow card) 72'	Stadium: Prince Mohammed bin Abdul Aziz Stadium; Attendance: 2,408; Referee: Abdulrahman Al-Sultan

25 November 2017 10	Al-Fateh	0–5	Al-Faisaly	Al-Hasa
17:30	Sharahili (yellow card) 44'; Sandro Manoel (yellow card) 64'; Yacoubi (yellow card) 71'	Report	Seraj 24', 57', (yellow card) 70'; Rogério 46', 77'; Luisinho (yellow card) 71'; Ndoro 89'	Stadium: Prince Abdullah bin Jalawi Stadium; Attendance: 1,104; Referee: Charalambos Kalogeropoulos (Greece)

30 November 2017 12	Al-Faisaly	0–1	Al-Batin	Al Majma'ah
17:45	Hyland (yellow card) 62'; Al-Sowayed (yellow card) 74'; Luisinho (yellow card) 80'; Al-Robeai (yellow card) 90+10'	Report	Jhonnattann 5', (yellow card) 81'; Waqes (yellow card) 7'; Freeh (yellow card) 48'; Nasser (yellow card) 78'	Stadium: King Salman Sport City Stadium; Attendance: 723; Referee: Adrien Jaccottet (Switzerland)

8 December 2017 13	Al-Shabab	0–1	Al-Faisaly	Riyadh
17:45	Al-Fahad (yellow card) 81'	Report	Seraj 37'	Stadium: Prince Faisal bin Fahd Stadium; Attendance: 878; Referee: Ian McNabb (Northern Ireland)

14 December 2017 14	Al-Nassr	1–1	Al-Faisaly	Riyadh
19:40	Al-Sahlawi 89'	Report	Seraj 43'; Al Mansor (yellow card) 66'; Majrashi (yellow card) 84'	Stadium: King Fahd International Stadium; Attendance: 1,166; Referee: Mark Clattenburg (England)

21 December 2017 15	Al-Faisaly	2–2	Al-Raed	Al Majma'ah
17:55	Al-Robeai (yellow card) 43'; Al-Shamekh 54' (o.g.); Al-Deayea (yellow card) 83'; Rossi (yellow card) 85'; Seraj 90+2'	Report	Al-Shamekh (yellow card) 7'; Amora 81'; Otaif 88'; Al-Rashidi (yellow card) 90+3'	Stadium: King Salman Sport City Stadium; Attendance: 612; Referee: Sultan Al-Harbi

28 December 2017 16	Al-Ittihad	3–3	Al-Faisaly	Jeddah
20:20	Al-Muwallad 12' (pen.); Abdoh (yellow card) 29'; Akaïchi 32', 64'	Report	Luisinho 17', 51'; Rogério 60'	Stadium: King Abdullah Sports City; Attendance: 4,382; Referee: Fahad Al-Mirdasi

1 January 2018 11	Al-Faisaly	1–1	Al-Hilal	Al Majma'ah
19:50	Rogério 32'; Al-Robeai (yellow card) 62'	Report	Al-Hafith (yellow card) 38'; Milesi (yellow card) 53'; Al-Breik (yellow card) 58'; Kharbin 73' (pen.)	Stadium: King Salman Sport City Stadium; Attendance: 1,796; Referee: Xavier Estrada (Spain)

13 January 2018 17	Al-Faisaly	2–0	Al-Qadsiah	Al Majma'ah
15:25	Hamad (yellow card) 15'; Hyland (yellow card) 45'; Hervé 70' (o.g.); Abousaban 82'	Report	Al-Khabrani (yellow card) 51'	Stadium: King Salman Sport City Stadium; Attendance: 508; Referee: Ismail Elfath (United States)

29 January 2018 19	Al-Fayha	2–2	Al-Faisaly	Al Majma'ah
20:10	Asprilla 24'; Kanno (yellow card) 25'; Jaafari (yellow card) 39'; Al-Khaibari (yellow card) 63'; Al-Robeai 77' (o.g.)	Report	Luisinho (yellow card) 61'; Rossi 84', 86'	Stadium: King Salman Sport City Stadium; Attendance: 1,403; Referee: Aleksei Eskov (referee) (Russia)

3 February 2018 20	Al-Faisaly	0–1	Al-Taawoun	Al Majma'ah
15:40	Hyland (yellow card) 64'	Report	Al-Mousa (yellow card) 74'; Amissi 86'	Stadium: King Salman Sport City Stadium; Attendance: 852; Referee: Artur Soares Dias (Portugal)

8 February 2018 21	Al-Ahli	2–1	Al-Faisaly	Jeddah
20:20	Al-Moasher 4'; Fetfatzidis 9' (pen.); Ben Amor (yellow card) 45+1'; Balghaith (yellow card) 51'; Assiri (yellow card) 78'; Al-Owais (yellow card) 84'; Claudemir (yellow card) 90+5'	Report	Luisinho 36'; Abdulaziz (yellow card) 45'; Al-Deayea (yellow card) 49'; Rossi (yellow card) 90+2'	Stadium: King Abdullah Sports City; Attendance: 9,595; Referee: Jarred Gillett (Australia)

17 February 2018 22	Al-Faisaly	2–0	Ohod	Al Majma'ah
18:35	Rogério 33', 81'	Report	Khoualed (yellow card) 16' (yellow-red card) 55'; Ftayni (yellow card) 68'; Aashor (yellow card) 77'	Stadium: King Salman Sport City Stadium; Attendance: 1,040; Referee: Matej Jug (Slovenia)

2 March 2018 23	Al-Hilal	1–0	Al-Faisaly	Riyadh
20:30	Rivas 29', (yellow card) 81'; Jahfali (yellow card) 38'; Bencharki (yellow card) 65'; Milesi (yellow card) 88'	Report	Rogério (yellow card) 45+1'; Gomaa (yellow card) 61'; Al-Robeai (yellow card) 68'	Stadium: Prince Faisal bin Fahd Stadium; Attendance: 22,483; Referee: Danilo Grujić (Serbia)

6 March 2018 18	Al-Ettifaq	0–0	Al-Faisaly	Dammam
18:25	Ben Youssef (yellow card) 29'; Al-Sonain (yellow card) 90+2'	Report	Majrashi (yellow card) 31'; Al-Ghanam (yellow card) 51'; Al-Robeai (yellow card) 60'	Stadium: Prince Mohamed bin Fahd Stadium; Attendance: 1,618; Referee: Ivan Bebek (Croatia)

10 March 2018 24	Al-Faisaly	0–2	Al-Fateh	Al Majma'ah
18:45	Rogério (yellow card) 51'; Hyland (yellow card) 60'; Luisinho (yellow card) 84'; Rossi (red card) 90+2'	Report	Al-Dawsari (yellow card) 34'; Al-Ghanam 48' (o.g.); Sakala 72'	Stadium: King Salman Sport City Stadium; Attendance: 1,022; Referee: Stephan Klossner (Switzerland)

7 April 2018 25	Al-Batin	3–1	Al-Faisaly	Hafar al-Batin
20:40	Jhonnattann 33', 60'; Kanabah (yellow card) 45+1'; Guilherme 54'; Hawsawi (yellow card) 59'	Report	Al Mansor 30'; Malayekah (yellow card) 40'; Majrashi (yellow card) 44'; Al-Ghanam (yellow card) 45'; Patrício (yellow card) 83'	Stadium: Al-Batin Club Stadium; Attendance: 874; Referee: Turki Al-Khudair

12 April 2018 26	Al-Faisaly	2–2	Al-Shabab	Al Majma'ah
19:00	Luisinho 46', 51'; Zé Eduardo (yellow card) 65'; Abousaban (yellow card) 78'; Gomaa (yellow card) 88'	Report	Majrashi 30'; Abdul-Amir (yellow card) 35'; Ghazi (yellow card) 40'; Kaabi 48'; Al-Shamrani (yellow card) 56'	Stadium: King Salman Sport City Stadium; Attendance: 1,333; Referee: Ivan Bebek (Croatia)

=== Crown Prince Cup ===
All times are local, AST (UTC+3).

8 September 2017 Round of 16	Al-Raed	1–0	Al-Faisaly	Buraidah
19:00	Shikabala 3'; Al-Rashidi (yellow card) 51'; Otaif (yellow card) 61'	Report	Luisinho (yellow card) 29'; Mendash (yellow card) 88'	Stadium: King Abdullah Sport City Stadium; Attendance: 780; Referee: Faisal Al-Blwi

=== King Cup ===
All times are local, AST (UTC+3).

6 January 2018 Round of 32	Al-Watani	2–3 (a.e.t.)	Al-Faisaly	Tabuk
15:55	Eisa 16', 53'; R. Al-Balawi (yellow card) 49'; N. Al-Balawi (yellow card) 87'; Majrashi (yellow card) 110'	Report	Abousaban 23'; Hamad (yellow card) 36'; Majrashi (yellow card) 51'; Rogério 80'; Al Mansor 91'	Stadium: King Khalid Sport City Stadium; Referee: Abdullah Al-Nuhait

20 January 2018 Round of 16	Al-Faisaly	2–0	Al-Nojoom	Al Majma'ah
15:30	Rogério 20'; Al Mansor (yellow card) 26'; Majrashi 78'	Report	Al-Batran (yellow card) 33'; Al-Sobeai (yellow card) 45+1'	Stadium: King Salman Sport City Stadium; Referee: Ismail Elfath (United States)

25 February 2018 Quarter-finals	Al-Qadsiah	2–3	Al-Faisaly	Khobar
18:20	Hervé 11'; Al-Khabrani (yellow card) 47'; Jorginho 62'; Al-Shoeil (yellow card) 78'; Kamara (yellow card) 79'; Al-Jizani (yellow card) 82'; Fallatah (yellow card) 90+1'	Report	Gomaa (yellow card) 16'; Luisinho 48' (pen.); Majrashi 54' (pen.); Rogério 59', (yellow card) 64'; Zé Eduardo (yellow card) 90+5'	Stadium: Prince Saud bin Jalawi Stadium; Referee: Paweł Raczkowski (Poland)

30 March 2018 Semi-finals	Al-Faisaly	1–0	Al-Ahli	Al Majma'ah
20:35	Zé Eduardo 77'	Report	Al-Shamrani (red card) 90+6'	Stadium: King Salman Sport City Stadium; Referee: Danny Makkelie (Netherlands)

12 May 2018 Final	Al-Faisaly	1–3 (a.e.t.)	Al-Ittihad	Jeddah
21:00	Luisinho (yellow card) 67'; Al-Robeai (yellow card) 84', (goal) 90+2'	Report	Assiri (yellow card) 19'; Al-Ghamdi 45'; Akaïchi (yellow card) 70'; Sufyani 100'; Al-Aryani 116'	Stadium: King Abdullah Sports City; Attendance: 60,184; Referee: Mark Clattenburg (England)

=== Zayed Champions Cup ===
Pos	Team	Pld	W	D	L	GF	GA	GD	Pts	Qualification	NEJ	CA	CON	FAI
1	(Lebanon) Al-Nejmeh	3	3	0	0	7	1	+6	9	Advance to First round	—	1–0	4–0	
2	(Tunisia) Club Africain	3	1	1	1	4	4	0	4			—		2–2
3	(Mauritania) ASAC Concorde	3	1	0	2	4	7	−3	3			1–2	—	
4	(Saudi Arabia) Al-Faisaly	3	0	1	2	4	7	−3	1		1–2		1–3	—

Source: Goalzz
Rules for classification: 1) Points; 2) Goal difference; 3) Goals scored.

17 May 2018 1	Club Africain (Tunisia)	2–2	(Saudi Arabia) Al-Faisaly	Jeddah, Saudi Arabia
21:30 UTC+3	Dhaouadi 58'; Khefifi 60'	Report	Zé Eduardo 13'; Mendash 90'	Stadium: King Abdullah Sports City; Referee: Mohanad Qasim Sarray (Iraq)

20 May 2018 2	Al-Faisaly (Saudi Arabia)	1–2	(Lebanon) Al-Nejmeh	Jeddah, Saudi Arabia
21:30 UTC+3	Luisinho 48'	Report	Matar 53'; Al Hajj 90+1'	Stadium: King Abdullah Sports City; Referee: Redouane Jiyed (Morocco)

23 May 2018 3	Al-Faisaly (Saudi Arabia)	1–3	(Mauritania) ASAC Concorde	Jeddah, Saudi Arabia
23:30 UTC+3	Hyland 53'		Seck 35', 78'; Sy 71'	Stadium: King Abdullah Sports City; Referee: Lahlou Benbraham (Algeria)

== Statistics ==
=== Squad statistics ===
As of 24 May 2018.

No.	Pos	Nat	Player	Total		Pro League		King Cup		Crown Prince Cup		Zayed Champions Cup	
No.	Pos	Nat	Player	Apps	Goals	Apps	Goals	Apps	Goals	Apps	Goals	Apps	Goals
1	GK	(Saudi Arabia)	Ibrahim Zaid	1	0	0	0	1	0	0	0	0	0
2	DF	(Saudi Arabia)	Sultan Al-Ghanam	26	0	21	0	4	0	1	0	0	0
3	DF	(Brazil)	Igor Rossi	31	3	24	3	4+1	0	0	0	2	0
4	DF	(Brazil)	Evson Patrício	3	0	1+1	0	1	0	0	0	0	0
5	DF	(Saudi Arabia)	Hussein Hawsawi	1	0	0	0	0	0	0	0	1	0
6	MF	(Saudi Arabia)	Omar Abdulaziz	32	1	24	1	4	0	1	0	3	0
7	DF	(Saudi Arabia)	Wesam Al-Sowayed	11	0	6	0	1	0	1	0	3	0
8	MF	(Brazil)	Luisinho	34	11	24+1	9	4+1	1	1	0	2+1	1
9	MF	(Brazil)	Rogério	31	9	20+2	6	4+1	3	1	0	3	0
10	MF	(Saudi Arabia)	Hussain Al-Qahtani	3	0	0+1	0	0	0	0	0	1+1	0
11	MF	(Saudi Arabia)	Mansor Hamzi	27	2	13+8	2	1+2	0	1	0	2	0
15	FW	(Saudi Arabia)	Islam Seraj	20	7	12+5	7	1+1	0	0+1	0	0	0
17	DF	(Saudi Arabia)	Yazeed Al-Bakr	1	0	0	0	0	0	0	0	1	0
19	FW	(Saudi Arabia)	Mohammed Majrashi	28	3	13+8	1	2+3	2	0+1	0	0+1	0
20	DF	(Saudi Arabia)	Hamad Al Mansor	24	2	15+4	1	5	1	0	0	0	0
23	MF	(Saudi Arabia)	Mohammed Abousaban	31	6	19+3	5	4+1	1	1	0	2+1	0
24	DF	(Saudi Arabia)	Jamaan Al-Dossari	8	0	6	0	0	0	1	0	1	0
26	GK	(Saudi Arabia)	Mustafa Malayekah	34	0	26	0	4	0	1	0	3	0
29	MF	(Saudi Arabia)	Fahad Hamad	13	0	1+9	0	1	0	0	0	0+2	0
30	DF	(Saudi Arabia)	Saeed Al-Robeai	20	1	15+2	0	2	1	0	0	1	0
33	DF	(Saudi Arabia)	Sultan Al-Deayea	18	0	10+4	0	2	0	0	0	1+1	0
45	MF	(Nigeria)	Moussa Eissa	0	0	0	0	0	0	0	0	0	0
47	MF	(Saudi Arabia)	Sultan Mendash	19	1	1+11	0	1+2	0	0+1	0	1+2	1
74	MF	(Egypt)	Saleh Gomaa	11	0	4+4	0	1+2	0	0	0	0	0
88	MF	(Trinidad and Tobago)	Khaleem Hyland	32	2	23+1	1	4+1	0	0	0	3	1
99	FW	(Brazil)	Zé Eduardo	12	2	2+4	0	2+1	1	0	0	3	1
Players who left during the season
13	DF	(Saudi Arabia)	Sultan Al-Bishi	5	0	2+1	0	1	0	1	0	0	0
14	MF	(Saudi Arabia)	Omar Al-Sohaymi	2	0	0+1	0	1	0	0	0	0	0
21	MF	(Saudi Arabia)	Abdullah Awaji	0	0	0	0	0	0	0	0	0	0
22	FW	(Romania)	Mircea Axente	2	0	2	0	0	0	0	0	0	0
77	FW	(Zimbabwe)	Tendai Ndoro	5	1	2+2	1	0	0	1	0	0	0

=== Goalscorers ===
Rank	No.	Pos	Nat	Name	Pro League	King Cup	Crown Prince Cup	Zayed Champions Cup	Total
1	8	MF	(Brazil)	Luisinho	9	1	0	1	11
2	9	FW	(Brazil)	Rogério	6	3	0	0	9
3	15	FW	(Saudi Arabia)	Islam Seraj	7	0	0	0	7
4	23	MF	(Saudi Arabia)	Mohammed Abousaban	5	1	0	0	6
5	3	DF	(Brazil)	Igor Rossi	3	0	0	0	3
5	19	FW	(Saudi Arabia)	Mohammed Majrashi	1	2	0	0	3
7	11	MF	(Saudi Arabia)	Mansor Hamzi	2	0	0	0	2
7	20	DF	(Saudi Arabia)	Hamad Al Mansor	1	1	0	0	2
7	88	MF	(Trinidad and Tobago)	Khaleem Hyland	1	0	0	1	2
7	99	FW	(Brazil)	Zé Eduardo	0	1	0	1	2
11	6	MF	(Saudi Arabia)	Omar Abdulaziz	1	0	0	0	1
11	30	DF	(Saudi Arabia)	Saeed Al-Robeai	0	1	0	0	1
11	47	MF	(Saudi Arabia)	Sultan Mendash	0	0	0	1	1
11	77	FW	(Zimbabwe)	Tendai Ndoro	1	0	0	0	1
Own goal					2	0	0	0	2
Total					39	10	0	4	53

Last Updated: 24 May 2018

=== Clean sheets ===
Rank	No.	Pos	Nat	Name	Pro League	King Cup	Crown Prince Cup	Zayed Champions Cup	Total
1	26	GK	(Saudi Arabia)	Mustafa Malayekah	6	2	0	0	8
Total					6	2	0	0	8

Last Updated: 30 March 2018
