= 2016–17 Al-Faisaly FC season =

Al-Faisaly
2016–17 season
- President: Fahd Al-Medlej
- Manager: Hélio dos Anjos
- Stadium: King Salman Sport City Stadium
- SPL: 7th
- Crown Prince Cup: Round of 16
- King Cup: Round of 32
- Top goalscorer: League: Mansor Hamzi (3); All: Mansor Hamzi (3)
| Home colours | Away colours |
- All statistics correct as of 15 October 2016.

The 2016–17 season is the Al-Faisaly Football Club's 7th consecutive season in Pro League, the top flight of Saudi Arabian football. Along with Pro League, Al-Faisaly also competed in the Crown Prince Cup and King Cup.

== Players ==
=== Squad information ===
As of 30 September 2016

Note: Flags indicate national team as defined under FIFA eligibility rules; some limited exceptions apply. Players may hold more than one non-FIFA nationality.

| No. | Pos. | Nation | Player |
|---|---|---|---|
| 1 | GK | KSA | Ibrahim Zaid |
| 26 | GK | KSA | Mustafa Malayekah |
| 30 | GK | KSA | Suliman Sofyani |
| 3 | DF | KSA | Abduelah Al-Mutairi |
| 4 | DF | BRA | Alemão |
| 5 | DF | KSA | Mohammed Salem |
| 7 | DF | KSA | Wesam Al-Sowayed |
| 22 | DF | KSA | Ayel Haqawi |
| 28 | DF | KSA | Sultan Al-Bishi |
| 31 | DF | KSA | Fawaz Fallatah |
| 44 | DF | KSA | Fahad Al-Munaif |
| 70 | DF | KSA | Sultan Al-Ghanam |
| 6 | MF | KSA | Omar Abdulaziz (Captain) |
| 10 | MF | KSA | Abdullah Al-Mutairi |
| 14 | MF | KSA | Omar Al-Sohaymi |
| 15 | MF | KSA | Mansor Hamzi |
| 17 | MF | KSA | Ali Al-Shoalah |

| No. | Pos. | Nation | Player |
|---|---|---|---|
| 20 | MF | ARG | Gonzalo Cabrera |
| 21 | MF | KSA | Abdullah Awaji |
| 25 | MF | KSA | Khaled Al-Zylaeei |
| 27 | MF | KSA | Dhowaihi Al-Sahali |
| 29 | MF | KSA | Fahad Al-Saqri |
| 45 | MF | KSA | Nader Al-Muwallad (on loan from Al-Shabab) |
| 55 | MF | KSA | Ahmed Al-Najei |
| 66 | MF | KSA | Ahmad Abbas |
| 77 | MF | KSA | Hassan Abo Shahin |
| 9 | FW | KSA | Fahad Al-Munaif |
| 18 | FW | KSA | Salem Al-Khaibari |
| 23 | FW | BRA | Everaldo Stum |
| 39 | FW | KSA | Mohammed Assiri |
| -- | DF | KSA | Sami Kassar |
| -- | MF | KSA | Hussain Al-Qahtani |
| -- | FW | KSA | Mohammed Majrashi |
| -- | FW | BRA | Luis Gustavo |

== Pre-season and friendlies ==
| v |

| v |

== Competitions ==
=== Overall ===
| Competition | Started round | Current position / round | Final position / round | First match | Last match |
|---|---|---|---|---|---|
| Professional League | Round 1 | — | — | 12 August 2016 | — |
| Crown Prince Cup | Round of 32 | — | Round of 16 | 27 August 2016 | 27 September 2016 |
| King Cup | Round of 32 | Round of 32 | — | — | — |

Last Updated: 27 September 2016

=== Pro League ===
==== League table ====
| Pos | Team | Pld | W | D | L | GF | GA | GD | Pts |
|---|---|---|---|---|---|---|---|---|---|
| 7 | Al-Taawoun | 26 | 9 | 4 | 13 | 33 | 40 | −7 | 31 |
| 8 | Al-Fateh | 26 | 7 | 8 | 11 | 33 | 39 | −6 | 29 |
| 9 | Al-Faisaly | 26 | 6 | 10 | 10 | 30 | 41 | −11 | 28 (Note: Al-Faisaly finished ahead of Al-Qadisiyah on head-to-head points: Al-Qadisiyah 1–1 Al-Faisaly, Al-Faisaly 3–2 Al-Qadisiyah) |
| 10 | Al-Qadisiyah | 26 | 6 | 10 | 10 | 38 | 38 | 0 | 28 |
| 11 | Al-Ettifaq | 26 | 7 | 6 | 13 | 31 | 45 | −14 | 27 |

Updated to match(es) played on 4 May 2017. Source: slstat.com
Rules for classification: 1) Points; 2) Head-to-head points; 3) Head-to-head goal difference; 4) Total goal difference; 5) Total goals scored; 6) Play-off (only for deciding champion, relegation and AFC competitions participation).

==== Results summary ====
| Overall | | | | | | | | Home | | | | | | Away | | | | | |
| Pld | W | D | L | GF | GA | GD | Pts | W | D | L | GF | GA | GD | W | D | L | GF | GA | GD |
|---|---|---|---|---|---|---|---|---|---|---|---|---|---|---|---|---|---|---|---|
| 5 | 2 | 2 | 1 | 6 | 7 | −1 | 8 | 2 | 1 | 0 | 5 | 2 | +3 | 0 | 1 | 1 | 1 | 5 | −4 |

Last updated: 15 October 2016.
Source: Competitive matches

==== Results by round ====
| Round | 1 | 2 | 3 | 4 | 5 | 6 | 7 | 8 | 9 | 10 | 11 | 12 | 13 | 14 | 15 | 16 | 17 | 18 | 19 | 20 | 21 | 22 | 23 | 24 | 25 | 26 |
|---|---|---|---|---|---|---|---|---|---|---|---|---|---|---|---|---|---|---|---|---|---|---|---|---|---|---|
| Ground | H | A | H | H | A | A | H | H | A | A | H | H | A | | | | | | | | | | | | | |
| Result | W | D | D | W | L | | | | | | | | | | | | | | | | | | | | | |
| Position | 3 | 4 | 6 | 4 | 7 | | | | | | | | | | | | | | | | | | | | | |

Updated to match(es) played on 15 October 2016. Source: Competitive matches
A = Away; H = Home; W = Win; D = Draw; L = Loss

==== Matches ====
All times are local, AST (UTC+3).

Win Draw Loss Postponed

| 12 August 2016 1 | Al-Faisaly | 3–1 | Al-Khaleej | Al Majma'ah |
| 19:10 | Hamzi 41', 51', 61' | Report | Alexander López 71'; Al Hejji (yellow card) 88'; Rishani (yellow card) 90' | Stadium: King Salman Sport City Stadium; Attendance: 214; Referee: Mishari Al-Mishari |

| 19 August 2016 2 | Al-Qadisiyah | 1–1 | Al-Faisaly | Khobar |
| 18:50 | Eze 12' | Report | Salem (red card) 18'; Abdulaziz (yellow card) 61'; Al-Munaif 70'; Zaid (yellow card) 88'; Al-Sowayed (yellow card) 89' | Stadium: Prince Saud bin Jalawi Stadium; Attendance: 199; Referee: Khaled Al Sinany |

| 17 September 2016 3 | Al-Faisaly | 0–0 | Al-Fateh | Al Majma'ah |
| 18:40 | N. Al-Muwallad (yellow card) 75'; Al-Mutairi (yellow card) 90' | Report | Abousaban (yellow card) 36' | Stadium: King Salman Sport City Stadium; Attendance: 204; Referee: Mohammed Al-Nuhait |

| 23 September 2016 4 | Al-Faisaly | 2–1 | Al-Wehda | Al Majma'ah |
| 18:15 | Fallatah (yellow card) 11'; Everaldo (yellow card) 44', (goal) 62' (pen.); Al-Mutairi 52'; Abbas (yellow card) 89' | Report | Felipe 13' (pen.); Al-Malki (yellow card) 28'; Dagoulou (yellow card) 59'; Belal (yellow card) 61'; Al-Qathami (yellow card) 89' | Stadium: King Salman Sport City Stadium; Attendance: 205; Referee: Saleh Al-Hathlool |

| 15 October 2016 5 | Al-Hilal | 4–0 | Al-Faisaly | Riyadh |
| 20:00 | Al-Shamrani 2', 68'; Eduardo 9', 64' | Report | N. Al-Muwallad (yellow card) 45+2'; Cabrera (yellow card) 51' | Stadium: King Fahd International Stadium; Attendance: 8,318; Referee: Mohammed Al-Hoish |

| 21 October 2016 6 | Al-Raed | v | Al-Faisaly | Buraidah |
| 18:10 | | Report | | Stadium: King Abdullah Sport City Stadium |

| 29 October 2016 7 | Al-Faisaly | v | Al-Nassr | Al Majma'ah |
| 19:50 | | Report | | Stadium: King Salman Sport City Stadium |

| 3 November 2016 8 | Al-Faisaly | v | Al-Shabab | Al Majma'ah |
| 17:55 | | Report | | Stadium: King Salman Sport City Stadium |

| 18 November 2016 9 | Al-Taawoun | v | Al-Faisaly | Buraidah |
| 19:45 | | Report | | Stadium: King Abdullah Sport City Stadium |

| 24 November 2016 10 | Al-Ettifaq | v | Al-Faisaly | Dammam |
| 17:30 | | Report | | Stadium: Prince Mohamed bin Fahd Stadium |

| 1 December 2016 11 | Al-Faisaly | v | Al-Ahli | Al Majma'ah |
| 19:40 | | Report | | Stadium: King Salman Sport City Stadium |

| 10 December 2016 12 | Al-Faisaly | v | Al-Ittihad | Al Majma'ah |
| 19:45 | | Report | | Stadium: King Salman Sport City Stadium |

| 15 December 2016 13 | Al-Batin | v | Al-Faisaly | Hafar al-Batin |
| 15:05 | | Report | | Stadium: Al-Batin Club Stadium |

| 14 | v |

| 15 | v |

| 16 | v |

| 17 | v |

| 18 | v |

| 19 | v |

| 20 | v |

| 21 | v |

| 22 | v |

| 23 | v |

| 24 | v |

| 25 | v |

| 26 | v |

=== Crown Prince Cup ===
All times are local, AST (UTC+3).

| 27 August 2016 Round of 32 | Weg | 0–2 | Al-Faisaly | Ta'if |
| 20:55 | | | Everaldo 20'; Abbas 36' | Stadium: King Fahd Stadium; Referee: Raed Al-Zahrani |

| 27 September 2016 Round of 16 | Al-Ahli | 2–1 | Al-Faisaly | Jeddah |
| 20:15 | Al-Robeai (yellow card) 37'; Al-Somah 66' (pen.), 83' (pen.); Kurdi (yellow card) 90'; Al-Moasher (yellow card) 90+1'; Al-Harbi (yellow card) 90+4' | | Abbas (yellow card) 21'; Salem (yellow card) 23'; Alemão 50', (yellow card) 68'; Hamzi (yellow card) 64'; Al-Sowayed (yellow card) 82'; Abdulaziz (yellow card) 90+1' | Stadium: King Abdullah Sports City; Referee: Turki Al-Khudhayr |

=== King Cup ===
| Round of 32 | v |

== Statistics ==
=== Goalscorers ===
| Rank | No. | Pos | Nat | Name | League | Crown Prince Cup | King Cup | Total |
|---|---|---|---|---|---|---|---|---|
| 1 | 15 | MF | (Saudi Arabia) | Mansor Hamzi | 3 | 0 | 0 | 3 |
| 2 | 23 | FW | (Brazil) | Everaldo Stum | 1 | 1 | 0 | 2 |
| 3 | 4 | DF | (Brazil) | Alemão | 0 | 1 | 0 | 1 |
| 3 | 10 | MF | (Saudi Arabia) | Abdullah Al-Mutairi | 1 | 0 | 0 | 1 |
| 3 | 44 | DF | (Saudi Arabia) | Fahad Al-Munaif | 1 | 0 | 0 | 1 |
| 3 | 66 | MF | (Saudi Arabia) | Ahmad Abbas | 0 | 1 | 0 | 1 |
| Total | | | | | 6 | 3 | 0 | 9 |

Last Updated: 30 September 2016

=== Clean sheets ===
| Rank | No. | Pos | Nat | Name | League | Crown Prince Cup | King Cup | Total |
|---|---|---|---|---|---|---|---|---|
| 1 | 1 | GK | (Saudi Arabia) | Ibrahim Zaid | 1 | 1 | 0 | 2 |
| Total | | | | | 1 | 1 | 0 | 2 |

Last Updated: 30 September 2016
