= 2016–17 Al-Qadisiyah FC season =

Al-Qadisiyah
2016–17 season
- President: Maadi Al-Hajri
- Manager: Hamad Al-Dossari
- Stadium: Prince Saud bin Jalawi Stadium
- SPL: 13th
- Crown Prince Cup: Round of 16
- King Cup: Round of 32
- Top goalscorer: League: Patrick Friday Eze (2); All: Patrick Friday Eze (2)
| Home colours | Away colours |
- All statistics correct as of 28 October 2016.

The 2016–17 season is the Al-Qadisiyah Football Club's second consecutive season in Pro League, the top flight of Saudi Arabian football. Along with the Pro League, Al-Qadisiyah also competed in the Crown Prince Cup and King Cup.

== Players ==
=== Squad information ===
As of 28 October 2016

Note: Flags indicate national team as defined under FIFA eligibility rules; some limited exceptions apply. Players may hold more than one non-FIFA nationality.

| No. | Pos. | Nation | Player |
|---|---|---|---|
| 1 | GK | KSA | Saad Al-Saleh |
| 21 | GK | KSA | Mohammed Assiri |
| 37 | GK | KSA | Abdulaziz Al-Shehri |
| 55 | GK | KSA | Faisel Masrahi |
| 2 | DF | KSA | Yassin Barnawi |
| 4 | DF | KSA | Sultan Masarhi |
| 5 | DF | KSA | Mohammed Al-Khabrani |
| 6 | DF | KSA | Nawaf Al-Sobhi |
| 13 | DF | KSA | Abdurahman Al-Obaid |
| 17 | DF | KSA | Abdulellah Al-Amer |
| 23 | DF | KSA | Ibrahim Al-Shoeil |
| 30 | DF | KSA | Khaled Al-Maghrabi |
| 44 | DF | KSA | Abdulmohsen Fallatah |
| 3 | MF | KSA | Ahmed Krenshi |
| 7 | MF | KSA | Hassan Al-Amri |

| No. | Pos. | Nation | Player |
|---|---|---|---|
| 8 | MF | KSA | Wesam Wahib |
| 10 | MF | BRA | Bismark Ferreira |
| 11 | MF | KSA | Ali Hazazi |
| 14 | MF | KSA | Hassan Jaafari (Captain) |
| 18 | MF | KSA | Naif Hazazi (Vice-captain) |
| 24 | MF | KSA | Abdurahman Al-Shahrani |
| 25 | MF | IRQ | Saad Abdul-Amir |
| 47 | MF | KSA | Mesfer Al-Najrani |
| 90 | MF | KSA | Ahmed Al-Nadhri (on loan from Al-Ittihad) |
| 9 | FW | BRA | Tiago Bizerra |
| 31 | MF | KSA | Aqeel Zaylea |
| 32 | FW | KSA | Fahad Al-Johani |
| 33 | FW | KSA | Mazen Abo Shararah |
| 45 | FW | NGA | Patrick Friday Eze (on loan from Al-Fujairah) |
| 70 | FW | KSA | Mutaeb Al-Najrani |

== Pre-season and friendlies ==
| v |

| v |

== Competitions ==
=== Overall ===
| Competition | Started round | Current position / round | Final position / round | First match | Last match |
|---|---|---|---|---|---|
| Professional League | Round 1 | — | — | 11 August 2016 | — |
| Crown Prince Cup | Round of 32 | — | Round of 16 | 26 August 2016 | 28 September 2016 |
| King Cup | Round of 32 | Round of 32 | — | — | — |

Last Updated: 28 October 2016

=== Pro League ===
==== League table ====
| Pos | Team | Pld | W | D | L | GF | GA | GD | Pts | Qualification or relegation |
|---|---|---|---|---|---|---|---|---|---|---|
| 8 | Al-Fateh | 26 | 7 | 8 | 11 | 33 | 39 | −6 | 29 | |
| 9 | Al-Faisaly | 26 | 6 | 10 | 10 | 30 | 41 | −11 | 28 (Note: Al-Faisaly finished ahead of Al-Qadisiyah on head-to-head points: Al-Qadisiyah 1–1 Al-Faisaly, Al-Faisaly 3–2 Al-Qadisiyah) | |
| 10 | Al-Qadisiyah | 26 | 6 | 10 | 10 | 38 | 38 | 0 | 28 | |
| 11 | Al-Ettifaq | 26 | 7 | 6 | 13 | 31 | 45 | −14 | 27 | |
| 12 | Al-Batin (O) | 26 | 6 | 8 | 12 | 31 | 43 | −12 | 26 | Qualification to relegation play-off |

Updated to match(es) played on 4 May 2017. Source: slstat.com
Rules for classification: 1) Points; 2) Head-to-head points; 3) Head-to-head goal difference; 4) Total goal difference; 5) Total goals scored; 6) Play-off (only for deciding champion, relegation and AFC competitions participation).
(O) Play-off winners

==== Results summary ====
| Overall | | | | | | | | Home | | | | | | Away | | | | | |
| Pld | W | D | L | GF | GA | GD | Pts | W | D | L | GF | GA | GD | W | D | L | GF | GA | GD |
|---|---|---|---|---|---|---|---|---|---|---|---|---|---|---|---|---|---|---|---|
| 7 | 0 | 3 | 4 | 3 | 8 | −5 | 3 | 0 | 1 | 2 | 2 | 4 | −2 | 0 | 2 | 2 | 1 | 4 | −3 |

Last updated: 28 October 2016.
Source: Competitive matches

==== Results by round ====
| Round | 1 | 2 | 3 | 4 | 5 | 6 | 7 | 8 | 9 | 10 | 11 | 12 | 13 | 14 | 15 | 16 | 17 | 18 | 19 | 20 | 21 | 22 | 23 | 24 | 25 | 26 |
|---|---|---|---|---|---|---|---|---|---|---|---|---|---|---|---|---|---|---|---|---|---|---|---|---|---|---|
| Ground | A | H | A | H | A | A | H | H | A | H | H | A | A | H | A | | | | | | | | | | | |
| Result | D | D | L | L | L | D | L | | | | | | | | | | | | | | | | | | | |
| Position | 8 | 10 | 12 | 13 | 13 | 13 | | | | | | | | | | | | | | | | | | | | |

Updated to match(es) played on 28 October 2016. Source: Competitive matches
A = Away; H = Home; W = Win; D = Draw; L = Loss

==== Matches ====
All times are local, AST (UTC+3).

Win Draw Loss Postponed

| 11 August 2016 1 | Al-Shabab | 0–0 | Al-Qadisiyah | Riyadh |
| 19:10 | | Report | Barnawi (yellow card) 20' | Stadium: King Fahd International Stadium; Attendance: 1,406; Referee: Sultan Al-Harbi |

| 19 August 2016 2 | Al-Qadisiyah | 1–1 | Al-Faisaly | Khobar |
| 18:50 | Eze 12' | Report | Salem (red card) 18'; Abdulaziz (yellow card) 61'; Al-Munaif 70'; Zaid (yellow card) 88'; Al-Sowayed (yellow card) 89' | Stadium: Prince Saud bin Jalawi Stadium; Attendance: 199; Referee: Khaled Al Sinany |

| 17 September 2016 3 | Al-Nassr | 1–0 | Al-Qadisiyah | Riyadh |
| 20:45 | S. Sharahili (yellow card) 54'; Ayala 60' | Report | Al-Khabrani (yellow card) 43'; Masrahi (yellow card) 63'; Jaafari (yellow card) 73' | Stadium: King Fahd International Stadium; Attendance: 2,689; Referee: Fahad Al-Mirdasi |

| 22 September 2016 4 | Al-Qadisiyah | 1–2 | Al-Hilal | Dammam |
| 20:25 | Eze 30'; Al-Khabrani (yellow card) 52' (yellow-red card) 58' | Report | Al-Ruwaili 3'; Al Abed 61' | Stadium: Prince Mohamed bin Fahd Stadium; Attendance: 5,820; Referee: Simon Lee Evans (Wales) |

| 15 October 2016 5 | Al-Ahli | 2–0 | Al-Qadisiyah | Jeddah |
| 20:00 | Al-Somah 39' (pen.), 86'; Bassas (yellow card) 66' | Report | Barnawi (yellow card) 54' | Stadium: King Abdullah Sports City; Attendance: 14,388; Referee: Shoukri Al-Hanfoush |

| 21 October 2016 6 | Al-Batin | 1–1 | Al-Qadisiyah | Hafar al-Batin |
| 18:00 | Nasser (yellow card) 48'; Hamoudi 70'; Ghunaiman (yellow card) 72' | Report | Ferreira 8'; Barnawi (yellow card) 19'; Al-Amri (yellow card) 59'; Abdul-Amir (yellow card) 61' (yellow-red card) 66'; Assiri (yellow card) 78' | Stadium: Al-Batin Club Stadium; Attendance: 1,017; Referee: Saleh Al-Hethlol |

| 28 October 2016 7 | Al-Qadisiyah | 0–1 | Al-Taawoun | Dammam |
| 17:40 | Al-Sobhi (yellow card) 60'; Ferreira (yellow card) 79' | Report | Otaif 38'; Al-Shameri (yellow card) 47'; Al-Zein (yellow card) 89' | Stadium: Prince Mohamed bin Fahd Stadium; Attendance: 221; Referee: Faisal Al-Blwi |

| 4 November 2016 8 | Al-Qadisiyah | v | Al-Khaleej | Dammam |
| 17:35 | | Report | | Stadium: Prince Mohamed bin Fahd Stadium |

| 18 November 2016 9 | Al-Fateh | v | Al-Qadisiyah | Al-Hasa |
| 17:35 | | Report | | Stadium: Prince Abdullah bin Jalawi Stadium |

| 26 November 2016 10 | Al-Qadisiyah | v | Al-Ittihad | Dammam |
| 19:50 | | Report | | Stadium: Prince Mohamed bin Fahd Stadium |

| 2 December 2016 11 | Al-Qadisiyah | v | Al-Raed | Khobar |
| 17:25 | | Report | | Stadium: Prince Saud bin Jalawi Stadium |

| 9 December 2016 12 | Al-Ettifaq | v | Al-Qadisiyah | Dammam |
| 17:30 | | Report | | Stadium: Prince Mohamed bin Fahd Stadium |

| 14 December 2016 13 | Al-Wehda | v | Al-Qadisiyah | King Abdul Aziz Stadium |
| 19:45 | | Report | | Attendance: Makkah |

| 21 December 2016 14 | Al-Qadisiyah | v | Al-Shabab | Khobar |
| 17:30 | | Report | | Stadium: Prince Saud bin Jalawi Stadium |

| 29 December 2016 15 | Al-Faisaly | v | Al-Qadisiyah | Al Majma'ah |
| 18:00 | | Report | | Stadium: King Salman Sport City Stadium |

| 16 | v |

| 17 | v |

| 18 | v |

| 19 | v |

| 20 | v |

| 21 | v |

| 22 | v |

| 23 | v |

| 24 | v |

| 25 | v |

| 26 | v |

=== Crown Prince Cup ===
All times are local, AST (UTC+3).

| 26 August 2016 Round of 32 | Al-Tai | 0–1 | Al-Qadisiyah | Ha'il |
| 19:20 | | | Al-Amri 40' | Stadium: Prince Abdul Aziz bin Musa'ed Stadium; Referee: Mohammed Al-Nuhait |

| 28 September 2016 Round of 16 | Al-Ittihad | 1–1 (a.e.t.) (8–7 p) | Al-Qadisiyah | Jeddah |
| 20:15 | Villanueva 42'; Kahraba (yellow card) 51'; Tombakti (yellow card) 56'; Assiri (yellow card) 90+4' | | N. Hazazi 12'; Abdul-Amir (yellow card) 38'; Barnawi (yellow card) 45+4' | Stadium: King Abdullah Sports City; Referee: Mishari Al-Mishari |
| | Penalties |
| | Akaïchi (penalty scored); Al Ansari (penalty missed); Al-Muwallad (penalty scored); Villanueva (penalty scored); Al-Daheem (penalty scored); Al-Nakhli (penalty scored); Al-Muziel (penalty scored); Bajandouh (penalty scored); Al-Qarni (penalty scored) | | (penalty scored) Bezerra; (penalty scored) N. Hazazi; (penalty missed) Al-Shoeil; (penalty scored) Fallatah; (penalty scored) Abdul-Amir; (penalty scored) Al-Khabrani; (penalty scored) Abo Shararah; (penalty scored) Al-Najrani; (penalty missed) Masrahi |

=== King Cup ===
| Round of 32 | v |

== Statistics ==
=== Goalscorers ===
| Rank | No. | Pos | Nat | Name | League | Crown Prince Cup | King Cup | Total |
|---|---|---|---|---|---|---|---|---|
| 1 | 45 | FW | (Nigeria) | Patrick Friday Eze | 2 | 0 | 0 | 2 |
| 2 | 7 | MF | (Saudi Arabia) | Hassan Al-Amri | 0 | 1 | 0 | 1 |
| 2 | 10 | MF | (Brazil) | Bismark Ferreira | 1 | 0 | 0 | 1 |
| 2 | 18 | MF | (Saudi Arabia) | Naif Hazazi | 0 | 1 | 0 | 1 |
| Total | | | | | 3 | 2 | 0 | 5 |

Last Updated: 28 October 2016

=== Clean sheets ===
| Rank | No. | Pos | Nat | Name | League | Crown Prince Cup | King Cup | Total |
|---|---|---|---|---|---|---|---|---|
| 1 | 55 | GK | (Saudi Arabia) | Faisel Masrahi | 1 | 1 | 0 | 2 |
| Total | | | | | 1 | 1 | 0 | 2 |

Last Updated: 28 October 2016
