= 2019–20 Damac F.C. season =

Damac
2019–20 season
- President: Saleh Abu Nekha'a
- Manager: Mohamed Kouki (until 5 October); Noureddine Zekri (from 5 October)
- Stadium: Prince Sultan bin Abdul Aziz Stadium
- SPL: 10th
- King Cup: Round of 16
- Top goalscorer: League: Emilio Zelaya (13); All: Emilio Zelaya (13)
- Highest home attendance: 14,680 vs Al-Ittihad (13 September 2019)
- Lowest home attendance: 1,320 vs Al-Ettifaq (11 January 2020)
- Average home league attendance: 7,168
Home colours	Away colours	Third colours
- All statistics correct as of 9 September 2020.

The 2019–20 season was Damac's 48th year in their history and first season back in the Pro League since the 1981–82 season after gaining promotion for finishing in the second place in the MS League last season. The club participated in the Pro League and the King Cup.

The season covered the period from 1 July 2019 to 9 September 2020.

== Players ==
=== Squad information ===
As of 1 February 2020

Note: Flags indicate national team as defined under FIFA eligibility rules; some limited exceptions apply. Players may hold more than one non-FIFA nationality.

No.	Pos.	Nation	Player
1	GK	KSA	Khalid Sharahili
3	DF	KSA	Sami Kassar
8	MF	KSA	Sami Al-Najei (on loan from Al-Nassr)
9	FW	KSA	Mansour Al-Muwallad (on loan from Al-Taawoun)
10	MF	KSA	Abdulaziz Al-Shahrani (on loan from Al-Ahli)
12	DF	KSA	Hassan Raghfawi (on loan from Al-Shabab)
17	MF	KSA	Mohammed Al-Shahrani (on loan from Al-Nassr)
18	MF	KSA	Muhannad Al-Najei
20	FW	KSA	Abdullah Al Ghamdi
21	DF	ALG	Farouk Chafaï
22	GK	KSA	Mohammed Al-Mahaneh
24	MF	KSA	Abdulaziz Al-Dhiyabi
26	GK	KSA	Mousa Zoulan
27	MF	KSA	Abdullah Al-Jouei (on loan from Al-Taawoun)
30	GK	ALG	Moustapha Zeghba

No.	Pos.	Nation	Player
33	DF	KSA	Jamaan Al-Dossari
35	MF	ALG	Ibrahim Chenihi
36	MF	TUN	Bilel Saidani
41	DF	KSA	Hassan Al-Shamrani
42	MF	BRA	Rafael Costa
45	DF	ARG	Sergio Vittor (on loan from Racing Club)
48	MF	KSA	Abdullah Al-Samti
50	MF	KSA	Morad Al-Rashidi
55	MF	TUN	Ghazi Ayadi
58	MF	KSA	Ayman Al-Hujaili
70	MF	KSA	Abdulwahab Jaafer
75	MF	KSA	Mohammed Harzan
88	DF	KSA	Majed Hazzazi
90	FW	ARG	Emilio Zelaya
96	DF	NGA	Imran Ilyas

=== Out on loan ===
Note: Flags indicate national team as defined under FIFA eligibility rules; some limited exceptions apply. Players may hold more than one non-FIFA nationality.

No.	Pos.	Nation	Player
11	MF	KSA	Saeed Hezam (at Ohod until 22 September 2020)
13	DF	KSA	Nahar Al-Qahtani (at Al-Kawkab until 22 September 2020)
15	FW	KSA	Mazen Abo Shararah (at Al-Ahli until 22 September 2020)

No.	Pos.	Nation	Player
80	FW	SDN	Mohammed Hassan (at Al-Tai until 22 September 2020)
87	FW	KSA	Abdullah Khattab (at Al-Mujazzal until 22 September 2020)

== Transfers and loans ==
=== Transfers in ===
Entry date	Position	No.	Player	From club	Fee	Ref.
28 May 2019	MF	7	(Morocco) Zakaria Hadraf	(Morocco) Raja Casablanca	$800,000	
28 May 2019	GK	16	(Algeria) Chamseddine Rahmani	(Algeria) CS Constantine	Undisclosed	
29 May 2019	DF	4	(Brazil) Jorge Fellipe	(Portugal) Aves	Undisclosed	
10 June 2019	DF	2	(Saudi Arabia) Hamad Al-Jayzani	(Saudi Arabia) Hajer	Free	
12 June 2019	MF	6	(Senegal) Babacar Sarr	(Russia) Yenisey Krasnoyarsk	Free	
16 June 2019	DF	25	(Saudi Arabia) Sultan Masrahi	(Saudi Arabia) Damac	Free	
5 July 2019	DF	88	(Saudi Arabia) Majed Hazzazi	(Saudi Arabia) Ohod	Free	
10 July 2019	MF	14	(Saudi Arabia) Abdulrahman Al-Safri	(Saudi Arabia) Jeddah	Free	
10 July 2019	MF	58	(Saudi Arabia) Ayman Al-Hujaili	(Saudi Arabia) Al-Ansar	Undisclosed	
11 July 2019	GK	22	(Saudi Arabia) Mohammed Al-Mahasneh	(Portugal) Fátima	Free	
12 July 2019	DF	3	(Saudi Arabia) Sami Kassar	(Saudi Arabia) Ohod	Free	
17 July 2019	FW	15	(Saudi Arabia) Mazen Abo Shararah	(Saudi Arabia) Al-Raed	Free	
19 July 2019	MF	23	(Saudi Arabia) Mohammed Abousaban	(Saudi Arabia) Al-Faisaly	Free	
21 July 2019	FW	9	(Morocco) Mouhcine Iajour	(Morocco) Raja Casablanca	Undisclosed	
28 July 2019	MF	70	(Saudi Arabia) Abdulwahab Jaafer	(Saudi Arabia) Al-Hazem	Undisclosed	
23 August 2019	MF	77	(Guinea-Bissau) Zezinho	(Slovakia) Senica	Free	
27 August 2019	GK	1	(Saudi Arabia) Khalid Sharahili	(Saudi Arabia) Ohod	Free	
27 August 2019	DF	33	(Saudi Arabia) Jamaan Al-Dossari	(Saudi Arabia) Al-Fateh	Free	
4 January 2020	DF	21	(Algeria) Farouk Chafaï	(Algeria) MC Alger	Undisclosed	
8 January 2020	GK	30	(Algeria) Moustapha Zeghba	(Saudi Arabia) Al-Wehda	Free	
8 January 2020	MF	35	(Algeria) Ibrahim Chenihi	(Saudi Arabia) Al-Fateh	Free	
9 January 2020	MF	24	(Saudi Arabia) Abdulaziz Al-Dhiyabi	(Saudi Arabia) Al-Shahed	Free	
9 January 2020	FW	87	(Saudi Arabia) Abdullah Khattab	(Saudi Arabia) Al-Nojoom	Free	
9 January 2020	MF	99	(Algeria) Najib Ammari	(Romania) Viitorul Constanța	Free	
11 January 2020	DF	96	(Nigeria) Imran Ilyas	(Saudi Arabia) Al-Shabab	Free	
17 January 2020	FW	90	(Argentina) Emilio Zelaya	(Cyprus) Apollon Limassol	$550,000	
20 January 2020	MF	75	(Saudi Arabia) Mohammed Harzan	(Saudi Arabia) Al-Taawoun	Free	
21 January 2020	MF	36	(Tunisia) Bilel Saidani	(Qatar) Al-Sailiya	Undisclosed	
23 January 2020	MF	50	(Saudi Arabia) Morad Al-Rashidi	(Saudi Arabia) Al-Washm	Free	
26 January 2020	MF	48	(Saudi Arabia) Abdullah Al-Samti	(Saudi Arabia) Al-Thoqbah	Free	
31 January 2020	MF	42	(Brazil) Rafael Costa	(Portugal) Boavista	Undisclosed	
31 January 2020	DF	41	(Saudi Arabia) Hassan Al-Shamrani	(Saudi Arabia) Al-Nahda	Free	
6 March 2020	MF	55	(Tunisia) Ghazi Ayadi	(Tunisia) Club Africain	Free	

=== Loans in ===
Start date	End date	Position	No.	Player	From club	Fee	Ref.
10 July 2019	End of season	DF	12	(Saudi Arabia) Hassan Raghfawi	(Saudi Arabia) Al-Shabab	None	
11 July 2019	End of season	MF	10	(Saudi Arabia) Abdulaziz Al-Shahrani	(Saudi Arabia) Al-Ahli	None	
11 July 2019	End of season	MF	17	(Saudi Arabia) Mohammed Al-Shahrani	(Saudi Arabia) Al-Nassr	None	
17 July 2019	End of season	MF	8	(Saudi Arabia) Sami Al-Najei	(Saudi Arabia) Al-Nassr	None	
17 July 2019	20 January 2020	FW	40	(Saudi Arabia) Muteb Al-Hammad	(Saudi Arabia) Al-Nassr	None	
1 January 2020	End of season	DF	45	(Argentina) Sergio Vittor	(Argentina) Racing	None	
21 January 2020	End of season	MF	27	(Saudi Arabia) Abdullah Al-Jouei	(Saudi Arabia) Al-Taawoun	None	
31 January 2020	End of season	FW	–	(Saudi Arabia) Mansour Al-Muwallad	(Saudi Arabia) Al-Taawoun	None	

=== Transfers out ===
Exit date	Position	No.	Player	To club	Fee	Ref.
14 June 2019	MF	6	(Saudi Arabia) Ahmed Al-Sultan	(Saudi Arabia) Al-Adalah	Free	
28 June 2019	DF	25	(Tunisia) Mahmoud Ben Salah	(Saudi Arabia) Al-Bukayriyah	Free	
29 June 2019	DF	30	(Saudi Arabia) Khaled Al-Maghrabi	(Saudi Arabia) Al-Tai	Free	
30 June 2019	DF	24	(Saudi Arabia) Abdullah Majrashi		Released	
30 June 2019	MF	9	(Syria) Ahmed Al Ahmed		Released	
30 June 2019	MF	14	(Saudi Arabia) Abdulrahman Selim		Released	
30 June 2019	MF	42	(Sudan) Saeed Mustafa		Released	
30 June 2019	MF	66	(Saudi Arabia) Akram Housah		Released	
30 June 2019	MF	77	(Saudi Arabia) Muhannad Al-Faresi		Released	
30 June 2019	FW	11	(Saudi Arabia) Abdullah Al-Meqbas		Released	
30 June 2019	FW	21	(Ivory Coast) Junior Magbi		Released	
3 July 2019	GK	1	(Syria) Khaled Haj Othman	(Saudi Arabia) Al-Bukayriyah	Free	
9 July 2019	MF	4	(Algeria) Hacène El Okbi	(Saudi Arabia) Al-Jabalain	Free	
10 July 2019	DF	13	(Saudi Arabia) Ali Meadi	(Saudi Arabia) Al-Faisaly	Undisclosed	
10 July 2019	DF	–	(Saudi Arabia) Waleed Sahari	(Saudi Arabia) Al-Jabalain	Free	
10 July 2019	MF	10	(Saudi Arabia) Ali Al-Aliany		Released	
12 July 2019	GK	22	(Saudi Arabia) Mutaeb Sharahili	(Saudi Arabia) Hetten	Free	
13 July 2019	DF	2	(Saudi Arabia) Mazen Othman	(Saudi Arabia) Al-Khaleej	Free	
5 August 2019	FW	–	(Saudi Arabia) Islam Seraj	(Saudi Arabia) Al-Shoulla	Free	
25 November 2019	DF	19	(Ivory Coast) Aubin Kouakou		Released	
4 January 2020	DF	5	(Saudi Arabia) Bandar Baajaj		Released	
4 January 2020	MF	7	(Morocco) Zakaria Hadraf		Released	
5 January 2020	GK	16	(Algeria) Chamseddine Rahmani	(Algeria) CS Constantine	Free	
7 January 2020	FW	9	(Morocco) Mouhcine Iajour		Released	
11 January 2020	MF	77	(Guinea-Bissau) Zezinho		Released	
13 January 2020	DF	4	(Brazil) Jorge Fellipe		Released	
14 January 2020	MF	6	(Senegal) Babacar Sarr		Released	
17 January 2020	DF	2	(Saudi Arabia) Hamad Al-Jayzani	(Saudi Arabia) Al-Wehda	Undisclosed	
17 January 2020	DF	25	(Saudi Arabia) Sultan Masrahi	(Saudi Arabia) Al-Khaleej	Free	
25 January 2020	MF	23	(Saudi Arabia) Mohammed Abousaban	(Saudi Arabia) Al-Taawoun	Undisclosed	
31 January 2020	MF	14	(Saudi Arabia) Abdulrahman Al-Safri		Released	

=== Loans out ===
Start date	End date	Position	No.	Player	To club	Fee	Ref.
27 August 2019	End of season	MF	11	(Saudi Arabia) Saeed Hezam	(Saudi Arabia) Ohod	None	
31 August 2019	End of season	MF	80	(Sudan) Mohammed Hassan	(Saudi Arabia) Al-Tai	None	
6 January 2020	End of season	DF	13	(Saudi Arabia) Nahar Al-Qahtani	(Saudi Arabia) Al-Kawkab	None	
26 January 2020	End of season	FW	87	(Saudi Arabia) Abdullah Khattab	(Saudi Arabia) Al-Mujazzal	None	
31 January 2020	End of season	FW	15	(Saudi Arabia) Mazen Abo Shararah	(Saudi Arabia) Al-Ahli	None	

== Pre-season ==
21 July 2019 Friendly	Damac (Saudi Arabia)	1–1	(Tunisia) Sfaxien	Tunisia
17:00 WAT	Zakaria Hadraf 23'	Report	Bakir 16'

27 July 2019 Friendly	Damac (Saudi Arabia)	0–0	(Saudi Arabia) Al-Adalah	Tunis, Tunisia
17:00 WAT		Report		Stadium: Stade Chedly Zouiten

30 July 2019 Friendly	Damac (Saudi Arabia)	0–3	(Tunisia) ES Sahel	Sousse, Tunisia
17:00 WAT		Report	Mejri 33'; Boukhanchouche 36'; Hassen 80'	Stadium: Stade Olympique de Sousse

4 August 2019 Friendly	Damac (Saudi Arabia)	3–1	(Saudi Arabia) Al-Nahda	Tunis, Tunisia
17:00 WAT	Al-Shahrani 32'; Abousaban 33'; Hadraf 87'	Report	Abas 74' (pen.)	Stadium: Stade El Menzah

== Competitions ==
=== Overall ===
Competition	Started round	Final position / round	First match	Last match
Pro League	—	10th	22 August 2019	9 September 2020
King Cup	Round of 64	Round of 16	7 November 2019	24 December 2019

Updated to match played 9 September 2020
Source: Competitions

=== Overview ===
Competition	Record							
Competition	G	W	D	L	GF	GA	GD	Win %
Pro League	30	9	8	13	37	52	−15	30.00
King Cup	3	2	0	1	5	5	+0	66.67
Total	33	11	8	14	42	57	−15	33.33

Updated to match played 9 September 2020
Source: Competitions

=== Pro League ===
==== League table ====
Pos	Team	Pld	W	D	L	GF	GA	GD	Pts
8	Al-Ettifaq	30	13	3	14	46	38	+8	42
9	Abha	30	11	5	14	41	52	−11	38
10	Damac	30	9	8	13	37	52	−15	35 (Note: Positions determined by head-to-head points: Damac: 9 pts; Al-Ittihad: 6 pts; Al-Taawoun: 3 pts.)
11	Al-Ittihad	30	9	8	13	42	41	+1	35
12	Al-Taawoun	30	10	5	15	33	40	−7	35

Updated to match(es) played on 9 September 2020. Source: spl.com
Rules for classification: 1) Points; 2) Head-to-head points; 3) Head-to-head goal difference; 4) Total goal difference; 5) Total goals scored; 6) Fair-play points (Note: Head-to-head record is used only after all the matches between the teams in question have been played).

==== Results summary ====
Overall								Home						Away					
Pld	W	D	L	GF	GA	GD	Pts	W	D	L	GF	GA	GD	W	D	L	GF	GA	GD
30	9	8	13	37	52	−15	35	6	6	3	24	19	+5	3	2	10	13	33	−20

Last updated: 9 September 2020.

==== Results by round ====
Round	1	2	3	4	5	6	7	8	9	10	11	12	13	14	15	16	17	18	19	20	21	22	23	24	25	26	27	28	29	30
Ground	A	A	H	H	A	H	A	H	A	H	H	A	A	H	A	H	H	A	A	H	A	H	A	H	A	A	H	H	A	H
Result	L	L	W	D	L	L	L	L	L	L	W	L	L	D	D	D	D	W	L	W	L	D	L	W	W	D	W	D	W	W
Position	16	15	13	12	15	15	16	16	16	16	15	16	16	16	16	16	16	14	16	15	15	15	15	15	15	15	14	14	14	10

Updated to match(es) played on 9 September 2020. Source:
A = Away; H = Home; W = Win; D = Draw; L = Loss

==== Matches ====
All times are local, AST (UTC+3).

Win Draw Loss Postponed

22 August 2019 1	Al-Nassr	2–0	Damac	Riyadh
19:00	Giuliano 24'; Hamdallah 45'	Report	Al-Najei (yellow card) 15'; Hazzam (yellow card) 18'	Stadium: King Fahd International Stadium; Attendance: 11,264; Referee: Matthew Conger (New Zealand)

29 August 2019 2	Al-Adalah	4–0	Damac	Al-Hasa
18:45	Biteghé 13'; Cissé 40'; Andriamatsinoro 45+2' (pen.); Al-Sultan (yellow card) 77'; Al-Eisa 82'	Report	Al-Safri (yellow card) 46'	Stadium: Prince Abdullah bin Jalawi Stadium; Attendance: 11,922; Referee: Danny Makkelie (Netherlands)

13 September 2019 3	Damac	2–1	Al-Ittihad	Abha
18:50	Iajour 2', 27'; Al-Dossari (yellow card) 20'; Rahmani (yellow card) 90+3'	Report	Vecchio 3'; El Ahmadi (yellow card) 90+1'	Stadium: Prince Sultan bin Abdul Aziz Stadium; Attendance: 14,680; Referee: Fabio Verissimo (Portugal)

19 September 2019 4	Damac	1–1	Al-Shabab	Abha
18:50	Fellipe 27'; Al-Jayzani (yellow card) 33'; Al-Najei (yellow card) 78'	Report	Guanca 40'	Stadium: Prince Sultan bin Abdul Aziz Stadium; Attendance: 9,035; Referee: Serdar Gözübüyük (Netherlands)

28 September 2019 5	Al-Hazem	4–0	Damac	Ar Rass
18:35	Strandberg 4', 69', (yellow card) 74'; Al-Habib 38'; Al-Ayyaf (yellow card) 54'; Omar 78'	Report	Al-Dossari (yellow card) 50'	Stadium: Al-Hazem Club Stadium; Attendance: 4,603; Referee: Krzysztof Jakubik (Poland)

3 October 2019 6	Damac	0–1	Al-Wehda	Abha
18:35		Report	Niakaté 10'; Botía (yellow card) 54'; Anselmo (yellow card) 76'	Stadium: Prince Sultan bin Abdul Aziz Stadium; Attendance: 9,613; Referee: Bobby Madden (Scotland)

18 October 2019 7	Al-Hilal	3–0	Damac	Riyadh
18:05	Giovinco 22'; Gomis 55'; Carlos Eduardo 68'; Bahebri (yellow card) 81'	Report	Al-Dossari (yellow card) 50' (yellow-red card) 63'; Hadraf (yellow card) 81'	Stadium: King Saud University Stadium; Attendance: 19,889; Referee: Hugo Miguel (Portugal)

25 October 2019 8	Damac	0–1	Al-Raed	Abha
18:20	Abousaban (yellow card) 70'	Report	Daoudi (yellow card) 45'; Fouzair 53' (pen.)	Stadium: Prince Sultan bin Abdul Aziz Stadium; Attendance: 6,916; Referee: Bas Nijhuis (Netherlands)

1 November 2019 9	Al-Faisaly	2–0	Damac	Al Majma'ah
17:55	Luisinho 15'; Hyland (yellow card) 25'; Al-Ghamdi 57'	Report	Al-Jayzani (yellow card) 36'; Al-Dossari (yellow card) 43'; Fellipe (yellow card) 51'; Al-Najei (yellow card) 64'; Al-Shahrani (yellow card) 90+4'	Stadium: Al Majma'ah Sports City; Attendance: 4,229; Referee: Anastasios Sidiropoulos (Greece)

23 November 2019 10	Damac	1–2	Al-Taawoun	Abha
15:30	Al-Jayzani (yellow card) 44'; Fellipe 49'; Abousaban (yellow card) 59'; Hazzazi (yellow card) 79'	Report	Manoel 45+1' (pen.), 90+7' (pen.), (yellow card) 86'; Cássio (yellow card) 50'; Al-Mousa (yellow card) 57'; Barnawi (yellow card) 87'	Stadium: Prince Sultan bin Abdul Aziz Stadium; Attendance: 3,644; Referee: Luis Branco Godinho (Portugal)

14 December 2019 11	Damac	2–1	Al-Fayha	Abha
15:35	Fernández 15' (o.g.); Iajour 45+3'; Al-Dossari (yellow card) 64'; Rahmani (yellow card) 75'; Al-Najei (yellow card) 82'	Report	Neto (yellow card) 45+7'; Al-Rashidi 45+9'; Nasser (yellow card) 52'; Al-Muziel (yellow card) 90+2'	Stadium: Prince Sultan bin Abdul Aziz Stadium; Attendance: 2,136; Referee: Viktor Kassai (Hungary)

19 December 2019 12	Al-Ahli	5–1	Damac	Jeddah
19:50	Djaniny 9', 58'; Al-Mogahwi 13'; Al-Bakr (yellow card) 40'; Lucas Lima 45', (yellow card) 60'; Al-Asmari 90+2'	Report	Hadraf 36'; Abousaban (yellow card) 84'	Stadium: King Abdullah Sports City; Attendance: 6,325; Referee: Turki Al-Khudhayr

28 December 2019 13	Abha	3–2	Damac	Abha
15:40	Al-Nabit (yellow card) 33'; Bguir 43' (pen.), 70'; Sharahili 45+3' (o.g.)	Report	Al-Shahrani (yellow card) 52'; Abousaban 66'; Al-Jayzani (yellow card) 77'; Abo Shararah 90+4'	Stadium: Prince Sultan bin Abdul Aziz Stadium; Attendance: 1,375; Referee: Ivan Bebek (Croatia)

11 January 2020 14	Damac	2–2	Al-Ettifaq	Abha
15:50	Abousaban 35'; Al-Hujaili (yellow card) 57'; Chafaï (yellow card) 71'; Jaafer 73'; Zeghba (yellow card) 88'; Abo Shararah (yellow card) 90+2'	Report	Hazazi (yellow card) 51'; Kiss 57' (pen.); Al-Qumaizi 90+4'	Stadium: Prince Sultan bin Abdul Aziz Stadium; Attendance: 1,320; Referee: Pavel Královec (Czech Republic)

23 January 2020 15	Al-Fateh	0–0	Damac	Al-Hasa
17:55	Majrashi (yellow card) 56'; Boushal (yellow card) 81'	Report	Ammari (red card) 72'	Stadium: Prince Abdullah bin Jalawi Stadium; Attendance: 12,290; Referee: Paweł Gil (Poland)

30 January 2020 16	Damac	1–1	Al-Nassr	Abha
16:00	Saidani (yellow card) 45'; Chafaï 52'; Zeghba (yellow card) 90+3'	Report	Al-Dossari (yellow card) 20'; Hamdallah 90+8' (pen.)	Stadium: Prince Sultan bin Abdul Aziz Stadium; Attendance: 11,250; Referee: Miroslav Zelinka (Czech Republic)

5 February 2020 17	Damac	1–1	Al-Adalah	Abha
16:00	Chenihi 49'; Ilyas (yellow card) 74'; Zeghba (yellow card) 77'	Report	Cissé (yellow card) 31'; Al-Yousef (yellow card) 65' (yellow-red card) 90+4'; Andria 78' (pen.); Al-Sultan (yellow card) 79'; Mostafa (yellow card) 83'	Stadium: Prince Sultan bin Abdul Aziz Stadium; Attendance: 5,921; Referee: Mario Zebec (Croatia)

10 February 2020 18	Al-Ittihad	1–2	Damac	Jeddah
20:20	Bony 67'; Gil (yellow card) 70'	Report	Saidani 9', 12', (yellow card) 54'; Costa (yellow card) 14'; Al-Samti (yellow card) 31'; Chafaï (yellow card) 89'	Stadium: King Abdullah Sports City; Attendance: 7,404; Referee: Jochem Kamphuis (Netherlands)

20 February 2020 19	Al-Shabab	3–2	Damac	Riyadh
18:30	Sebá 17' (pen.); Salem (yellow card) 22'; Al-Shamekh (red card) 45+2'; Sharahili (yellow card) 49'; Al-Zori 76'; Guanca 88'	Report	Saidani (yellow card) 25'; Costa 45+6'; Zelaya 56'; Chafaï (yellow card) 90+3'	Stadium: Prince Khalid Bin Sultan Stadium; Attendance: 5,217; Referee: Matthew Conger (New Zealand)

28 February 2020 20	Damac	3–0	Al-Hazem	Abha
18:10	Saidani (yellow card) 25'; Chafaï 78'; Zelaya 87', 90+2' (pen.)	Report	Alemão (yellow card) 80'	Stadium: Prince Sultan bin Abdul Aziz Stadium; Attendance: 1,533; Referee: Mohammed Al-Hoaish

6 March 2020 21	Al-Wehda	3–2	Damac	Mecca
19:05	Bakshween (yellow card) 55'; Niakaté 59'; Anselmo 65', (yellow card) 83'; Luisinho 80'	Report	Al-Jouei 34'; Al-Shahrani (yellow card) 55'; Vittor (yellow card) 59'; Zelaya 90+4'	Stadium: King Abdul Aziz Stadium; Attendance: 10,303; Referee: Faisal Al-Blwi

11 March 2020 22	Damac	1–1	Al-Hilal	Abha
16:10	Zelaya 42'; Al-Jouei (yellow card) 88'	Report	Carrillo 39'	Stadium: Prince Sultan bin Abdul Aziz Stadium; Attendance: 0 (Note: Matches from 7 March and onwards will be played behind closed doors due to concerns over the coronavirus pandemic.); Referee: Pavel Královec (Czech Republic)

4 August 2020 23	Al-Raed	3–0	Damac	Buraidah
19:25	Pérez 8'; Al-Zain 45+2', (yellow card) 71'; Fouzair 80'; Daoudi (yellow card) 90+3'	Report	Ilyas (yellow card) 20'; Hazzazi (yellow card) 49'; Al-Samti (yellow card) 54'	Stadium: King Abdullah Sport City Stadium; Attendance: 0 Referee: Khaled Al-Teris

9 August 2020 24	Damac	2–1	Al-Faisaly	Abha
19:15	Zelaya 27', 55'; Zeghba (yellow card) 90+2'	Report	El Jebli 81' (pen.); Al-Ghamdi (yellow card) 88'	Stadium: Prince Sultan bin Abdul Aziz Stadium; Attendance: 0 Referee: Sultan Al-Harbi

15 August 2020 25	Al-Taawoun	0–2	Damac	Buraidah
19:15	Al-Abdulmenem (yellow card) 72'; Assiri (yellow card) 82'; Mendash (yellow card) 85'; Al-Mousa (yellow card) 89'	Report	Saidani 45'; Chafaï 56'; Al-Najei (yellow card) 90+5'	Stadium: King Abdullah Sport City Stadium; Attendance: 0 Referee: Georgi Kabakov (Bulgaria)

20 August 2020 26	Al-Fayha	0–0	Damac	Al Majma'ah
19:05	Villanueva (yellow card) 45+3'	Report		Stadium: Al Majma'ah Sports City; Attendance: 0 Referee: Bobby Madden (Scotland)

25 August 2020 27	Damac	2–1	Al-Ahli	Abha
19:05	Zelaya (yellow card) 14', (goal) 24' (pen.), 38'; Ayadi (yellow card) 52'	Report	Al Somah 60'; Al-Khabrani (yellow card) 66' (yellow-red card) 75'	Stadium: Prince Sultan bin Abdul Aziz Stadium; Attendance: 0 Referee: Gediminas Mažeika (Lithuania)

29 August 2020 28	Damac	2–2	Abha	Abha
19:00	Zelaya 8'; Saidani (yellow card) 19'; Vittor 45+2'; Al-Najei (yellow card) 50' (yellow-red card) 59'; Al-Hujaili (yellow card) 67'; Ayadi (yellow card) 71'	Report	Al-Qeed (yellow card) 11', (goal) 15'; Aouadhi (yellow card) 68', (goal) 89'; Barnawi (yellow card) 82'	Stadium: Prince Sultan bin Abdul Aziz Stadium; Attendance: 0 Referee: Andrés Cunha (Uruguay)

4 September 2020 29	Al-Ettifaq	0–2	Damac	Dammam
20:35	Mahnashi (yellow card) 1'	Report	Zelaya 21'; Harzan 63'; Zeghba (yellow card) 90+3'	Stadium: Prince Mohamed bin Fahd Stadium; Attendance: 0 Referee: Majed Al-Shamrani

9 September 2020 30	Damac	4–3	Al-Fateh	Abha
20:35	Vittor (yellow card) 6'; Zelaya 9' (pen.), 71' (pen.); Chenihi 44'; Harzan (yellow card) 45+3'; Al-Najei (yellow card) 50'; Al-Jouei 87'; Zeghba (yellow card) 90+5'	Report	Kanabah (yellow card) 23'; Naji 45+2' te Vrede 58' (pen.), 84' (pen.); Al-Saeed (yellow card) 70'	Stadium: Prince Sultan bin Abdul Aziz Stadium; Attendance: 0 Referee: Faisal Al-Blwi

=== King Cup ===
All times are local, AST (UTC+3).

7 November 2019 Round of 64	Al-Hejaz	0–1	Damac	Al Bahah
15:45	Salem (yellow card) 36'; Al-Zahrani (yellow card) 89'	Report	Zezinho 73' (pen.)	Stadium: King Saud Sport City Stadium; Referee: Sami Al-Jires

5 December 2019 Round of 32	Damac	2–1	Al-Jeel	Abha
15:20	Al-Najei 35'; Zezinho 40'	Report	Al-Dossari 86'	Stadium: Prince Sultan bin Abdul Aziz Stadium; Referee: Mohammed Al-Buraidi

24 December 2019 Round of 16	Damac	2–4	Al-Nassr	Abha
15:40	Abo Shararah 37', 44'; Zezinho (yellow card) 54'; Abousaban (yellow card) 65'; Al-Najei (red card) 67'	Report	Hamdallah 45+5' (pen.), 83' (pen.), 84'; Al-Shehri 76'	Stadium: Prince Sultan bin Abdul Aziz Stadium; Referee: Bakary Gassama (Gambia)

== Statistics ==
=== Appearances ===
Last updated on 9 September 2020.

No.	Pos	Nat	Player	Total		Pro League		King Cup	
No.	Pos	Nat	Player	Apps	Goals	Apps	Goals	Apps	Goals
Goalkeepers
1	GK	(Saudi Arabia) KSA	Khalid Sharahili	5	0	2	0	3	0
22	GK	(Saudi Arabia) KSA	Mohammed Al-Mahasneh	0	0	0	0	0	0
26	GK	(Saudi Arabia) KSA	Mousa Zoulan	0	0	0	0	0	0
30	GK	(Algeria) ALG	Moustapha Zeghba	16	0	16	0	0	0
Defenders
3	DF	(Saudi Arabia) KSA	Sami Kassar	5	0	5	0	0	0
12	DF	(Saudi Arabia) KSA	Hassan Raghfawi	13	0	10+3	0	0	0
21	DF	(Algeria) ALG	Farouk Chafaï	17	3	17	3	0	0
33	DF	(Saudi Arabia) KSA	Jamaan Al-Dossari	9	0	6+2	0	1	0
45	DF	(Argentina) ARG	Sergio Vittor	17	1	17	1	0	0
88	DF	(Saudi Arabia) KSA	Majed Hazzazi	25	0	22	0	3	0
96	DF	(Nigeria) NGA	Imran Ilyas	9	0	9	0	0	0
Midfielders
8	MF	(Saudi Arabia) KSA	Sami Al-Najei	18	1	7+10	0	1	1
10	MF	(Saudi Arabia) KSA	Abdulaziz Al-Shahrani	16	0	8+7	0	1	0
14	MF	(Saudi Arabia) KSA	Abdulrahman Al-Safri	12	0	5+4	0	1+2	0
17	MF	(Saudi Arabia) KSA	Mohammed Al-Shahrani	9	0	2+5	0	2	0
18	MF	(Saudi Arabia) KSA	Muhannad Al-Najei	16	0	8+6	0	0+2	0
24	MF	(Saudi Arabia) KSA	Abdulaziz Al-Dhiyabi	6	0	0+6	0	0	0
27	MF	(Saudi Arabia) KSA	Abdullah Al-Jouei	14	2	8+6	2	0	0
28	MF	(Saudi Arabia) KSA	Saeed Marzouq	0	0	0	0	0	0
35	MF	(Algeria) ALG	Ibrahim Chenihi	17	2	14+3	2	0	0
36	MF	(Tunisia) TUN	Bilel Saidani	15	3	15	3	0	0
48	MF	(Saudi Arabia) KSA	Abdullah Al-Samti	8	0	7+1	0	0	0
50	MF	(Saudi Arabia) KSA	Morad Al-Rashidi	4	0	1+3	0	0	0
55	MF	(Tunisia) TUN	Ghazi Ayadi	10	0	7+3	0	0	0
58	MF	(Saudi Arabia) KSA	Ayman Al-Hujaili	14	0	4+9	0	1	0
70	MF	(Saudi Arabia) KSA	Abdulwahab Jaafer	18	1	6+10	1	2	0
75	MF	(Saudi Arabia) KSA	Mohammed Harzan	15	1	8+7	1	0	0
Forwards
20	FW	(Saudi Arabia) KSA	Abdullah Al Ghamdi	2	0	0+1	0	0+1	0
90	FW	(Argentina) ARG	Emilio Zelaya	16	13	16	13	0	0
Players sent out on loan this season
11	MF	(Saudi Arabia) KSA	Saeed Hezam	1	0	1	0	0	0
13	DF	(Saudi Arabia) KSA	Nahar Al-Qahtani	0	0	0	0	0	0
15	FW	(Saudi Arabia) KSA	Mazen Abo Shararah	9	3	2+5	1	1+1	2
80	FW	(Sudan) SDN	Mohammed Hassan	2	0	1+1	0	0	0
Player who made an appearance this season but have left the club
2	DF	(Saudi Arabia) KSA	Hamad Al-Jayzani	15	0	12	0	3	0
4	DF	(Brazil) BRA	Jorge Fellipe	16	2	13	2	3	0
5	DF	(Saudi Arabia) KSA	Bandar Baajaj	2	0	2	0	0	0
6	MF	(Senegal) SEN	Babacar Sarr	15	0	13	0	2	0
7	MF	(Morocco) MAR	Zakaria Hadraf	16	1	12+1	1	2+1	0
9	FW	(Morocco) MAR	Mouhcine Iajour	13	3	12	3	1	0
16	GK	(Algeria) ALG	Chamseddine Rahmani	12	0	12	0	0	0
19	DF	(Ivory Coast) CIV	Aubin Kouakou	4	0	4	0	0	0
23	MF	(Saudi Arabia) KSA	Mohammed Abousaban	13	2	10	2	3	0
40	FW	(Saudi Arabia) KSA	Muteb Al-Hammad	3	0	0+1	0	0+2	0
42	MF	(Brazil) BRA	Rafael Costa	3	1	3	1	0	0
77	MF	(Guinea-Bissau) GNB	Zezinho	14	2	11	0	3	2
87	FW	(Saudi Arabia) KSA	Abdullah Khattab	0	0	0	0	0	0
99	MF	(Algeria) ALG	Najib Ammari	2	0	2	0	0	0

=== Goalscorers ===
Rank	No.	Pos	Nat	Name	Pro League	King Cup	Total
1	90	FW	(Argentina)	Emilio Zelaya	13	0	13
2	9	FW	(Morocco)	Mouhcine Iajour	3	0	3
2	15	FW	(Saudi Arabia)	Mazen Abo Shararah	1	2	3
2	21	DF	(Algeria)	Farouk Chafaï	3	0	3
2	36	MF	(Tunisia)	Bilel Saidani	3	0	3
6	4	DF	(Brazil)	Jorge Fellipe	2	0	2
6	23	MF	(Saudi Arabia)	Mohammed Abousaban	2	0	2
6	27	MF	(Saudi Arabia)	Abdullah Al-Jouei	2	0	2
6	35	MF	(Algeria)	Ibrahim Chenihi	2	0	2
6	77	MF	(Guinea-Bissau)	Zezinho	0	2	2
11	7	MF	(Morocco)	Zakaria Hadraf	1	0	1
11	8	MF	(Saudi Arabia)	Sami Al-Najei	0	1	1
11	42	MF	(Brazil)	Rafael Costa	1	0	1
11	45	DF	(Argentina)	Sergio Vittor	1	0	1
11	70	MF	(Saudi Arabia)	Abdulwahab Jaafer	1	0	1
11	75	MF	(Saudi Arabia)	Mohammed Harzan	1	0	1
Own goal					1	0	1
Total					33	5	38

Last Updated: 9 September 2020

=== Clean sheets ===
Rank	No.	Pos	Nat	Name	Pro League	King Cup	Total
1	1	GK	(Saudi Arabia)	Khalid Sharahili	1	1	2
1	30	GK	(Algeria)	Moustapha Zeghba	2	0	2
Total					3	1	4

Last Updated: 4 September 2020
