= Mohammed Assiri =

Mohammed Assiri may refer to:

- Mohammed Assiri (footballer, born 1992)
- Mohammed Assiri (footballer, born 1995)
