= Tendai Ndoro =

Zimbabwean footballer (1985–2025)

Personal information
- Full name: Tendai Passion Ndoro
- Date of birth: 15 May 1985
- Place of birth: Luveve, Bulawayo, Zimbabwe
- Date of death: 18 August 2025 (aged 40)
- Place of death: Johannesburg, South Africa
- Height: 1.72 m (5 ft 8 in)
- Position: Forward

Senior career*
Years	Team	Apps	(Gls)
2009–2011	Nico United		
2011–2013	Chicken Inn		
2013–2015	Mpumalanga Black Aces	41	(14)
2013	→ Chicken Inn (loan)		
2015–2017	Orlando Pirates	48	(25)
2017	Al-Faisaly	4	(1)
2018	Ajax Cape Town	7	(1)
2018–2020	Highlands Park	22	(5)
2020	Al-Orouba		

International career
2013–2017	Zimbabwe	14	(5)
Medal record
Orlando Pirates
Runner-up	Nedbank Cup	2015–16
Runner-up	Nedbank Cup	2016–17
- * Club domestic league appearances and goals

Tendai Passion Ndoro (15 May 1985 – 18 August 2025) was a Zimbabwean professional footballer who played as a forward.

== Club career ==
Ndoro started his career with Chicken Inn of Zimbabwe in 2011. Two years later, Ndoro completed a move to South African club Black Aces but was immediately returned to Chicken Inn on loan for the rest of the 2013 season. In 2014, he officially joined the Black Aces squad and subsequently made 41 appearances and scored 14 goals over two seasons before departing in 2015 to join Orlando Pirates.

In the 2017–18 season he appeared for three clubs - Orlando Pirates, Al Faisaly, and Ajax Cape Town, in breach of FIFA regulations. As a result, Ajax Cape Town had to forfeit the three league games he had appeared in for them, resulting in their relegation from the South African Premiership.

On 26 September, Ndoro signed for Highlands Park.

On 27 December 2019, Al-Orouba from Oman announced that they had signed Ndoro. Ndoro played for the club less than a season in 2020 before the club went bankrupt and closed. Following this sting, Ndoro became ill and was close to a mental breakdown. But in August 2022, he revealed, that he was ready to continue his career.

== Death ==
Ndoro died in Johannesburg, South Africa on 18 August 2025, at the age of 40.

== Career statistics ==
=== Club ===
Appearances and goals by club, season and competition
Club	Season	League			National cup		League cup		Continental		Other		Total	
Club	Season	Division	Apps	Goals	Apps	Goals	Apps	Goals	Apps	Goals	Apps	Goals	Apps	Goals
Mpumalanga Black Aces	2013–14	Premiership	16	7	1 (Note: Appearances in the Nedbank Cup)	0	0	0	0	0	0	0	17	7
Mpumalanga Black Aces	2014–15	Premiership	25	7	2	0	1 (Note: Appearances in the Telkom Knockout)	0	0	0	1 (Note: Appearances in the MTN 8)	0	29	7
Mpumalanga Black Aces	Total		41	14	3	0	1	0	0	0	1	0	46	14
Orlando Pirates	2015–16	Premiership	17	5	5	5	0	0	0	0	0	0	22	10
Orlando Pirates	2016–17	Premiership	30	12	3	0	3	1	0	0	1	0	37	13
Orlando Pirates	2017–18	Premiership	1	0	0	0	0	0	0	0	0	0	1	0
Orlando Pirates	Total		48	25	8	5	3	1	0	0	1	0	60	23
Al-Faisaly	2017–18	Saudi Professional League	4	1	1 (Note: Appearances in the Saudi Crown Prince Cup)	0	0	0	0	0	0	0	5	1
Ajax Cape Town	2017–18	Premiership	7	1	1	0	0	0	0	0	0	0	8	1
Career total			100	41	13	5	4	1	0	0	2	0	119	46

=== International ===
Appearances and goals by national team and year
National team	Year	Apps	Goals
Zimbabwe	2013	5	2
Zimbabwe	2014	2	0
Zimbabwe	2015	0	0
Zimbabwe	2016	1	0
Zimbabwe	2017	6	3
Zimbabwe	2018	0	0
Total		14	5

Scores and results list Zimbabwe's goal tally first, score column indicates score after each Ndoro goal.

List of international goals scored by Tendai Ndoro
No.	Date	Venue	Opponent	Score	Result	Competition
1	17 July 2013	Levy Mwanawasa Stadium, Ndola, Zambia	Lesotho	1–1	2–1	2013 COSAFA Cup
2	17 July 2013	Levy Mwanawasa Stadium, Ndola, Zambia	Lesotho	2–1	2–1	2013 COSAFA Cup
3	10 January 2017	Stade Ahmadou Ahidjo, Yaoundé, Cameroon	Cameroon	1–0	1–1	Friendly
4	23 January 2017	Stade d'Angondjé, Libreville, Gabon	Tunisia	2–4	2–4	2017 Africa Cup of Nations
5	11 November 2017	Sam Nujoma Stadium, Windhoek, Namibia	Namibia	1–2	1–3	Friendly
