= Mohammed Abousaban =

Saudi Arabian footballer (born 1990)

Personal information
- Full name: Mohammed Abdullah Abousaban
- Date of birth: 20 January 1990 (age 36)
- Place of birth: Hofuf, Saudi Arabia
- Height: 1.76 m (5 ft 9 in)
- Position: Central midfielder

Youth career
- –2007: Hajer Club
- 2007–2010: Al-Ittihad

Senior career*
Years	Team	Apps	(Gls)
2009–2016	Al-Ittihad	82	(6)
2016–2017	Al-Fateh	9	(0)
2017	→ Al-Taawoun (loan)	4	(0)
2017–2019	Al-Faisaly	30	(5)
2019–2020	Damac	10	(2)
2020–2022	Al-Taawoun	40	(0)
2022–2023	Al-Fayha	27	(0)
2023–2024	Al-Hazem	13	(0)

International career^{‡}
2006–2008	Saudi Arabia U20		
2013–	Saudi Arabia	2	(0)
- * Club domestic league appearances and goals as of 25 January 2020 ‡ National team caps and goals as of 28 February 2018

Mohammed Abusaban (Arabic: محمد أبو سبعان; born 20 January 1990), is a Saudi footballer who plays as central midfielder.

== Career ==
Abousaban started his career at the youth teams of Hajer. On 4 July 2007, Abousaban joined Al-Ittihad. He was promoted to the first team in 2010 and made his debut in the league match against Al-Shabab on 11 May 2011. During the 2011–12 season, Abousaban started to be included into the squad more often and eventually became a first-team player. On 29 January 2012, Abousaban was fined SAR10,000 and suspended for 4 matches for stepping on Nawaf Al Abed during the Crown Prince Cup semi-finals against Al-Hilal. On 10 April 2012, he was once again suspended for two matches for attacking a player during the league match against Al-Nassr. On 7 May 2012, Abousaban signed a contract extension with Al-Ittihad keeping him at the club until 2017.

On 22 June 2016, Abousaban left Al-Ittihad and signed a 2-year contract with Al-Fateh. He made 11 appearances for the club and left mid-season. On 31 January 2017, Abousaban joined Al-Taawoun on a six-month loan. On 19 July 2017, Abousaban signed a 2-year contract with Al-Faisaly. He made his debut for Al-Faisaly on 17 August 2017 in the league match against Al-Raed. He also scored his goal for the club during the same match which ended in a 3–2 win for Al-Faisaly. He ended his first season with Al-Faisaly making 28 appearances and scoring 6 goals. His impressive performances earned him a call-up to the Saudi national team for the friendly against Iraq. However, his second season at the club was more disappointing as Abousaban suffered from injuries. He made only 12 appearances in his second season with Al-Faisaly. Following the expiry of his contract, Abousaban joined newly-promoted side Damac. He made 13 appearances in all competitions for the club and scored twice in the league. On 25 January 2020, Abousaban rejoined Al-Taawoun but this time on a permanent basis. He signed a 2 and a half years contract with the club. On 30 January 2022, Abousaban joined Al-Fayha. On 7 September 2023, Abousaban joined Al-Hazem on a one-year deal.

== Career statistics ==
=== Club ===
As of 30 January 2022

Club	Season	League			King Cup		Crown Prince Cup (Note: Discontinued in September 19, 2017)		Asia		Other		Total	
Club	Season	Division	Apps	Goals	Apps	Goals	Apps	Goals	Apps	Goals	Apps	Goals	Apps	Goals
Al-Ittihad	2009–10	Pro League	0	0	0	0	0	0	0	0	–	–	0	0
Al-Ittihad	2010–11	Pro League	1	0	0	0	0	0	3	0	–	–	4	0
Al-Ittihad	2011–12	Pro League	15	0	0	0	3	1	7	3	–	–	25	4
Al-Ittihad	2012–13	Pro League	18	3	3	1	1	0	–	–	–	–	22	4
Al-Ittihad	2013–14	Pro League	19	0	4	0	2	0	6	0	1	0	32	0
Al-Ittihad	2014–15	Pro League	15	1	1	0	1	0	–	–	–	–	17	1
Al-Ittihad	2015–16	Pro League	14	2	1	0	2	0	1	0	–	–	18	2
Al-Ittihad	Al-Ittihad Total		82	6	9	1	9	1	17	3	1	0	118	11
Al-Fateh	2016–17	Pro League	9	0	0	0	2	0	0	0	–	–	11	0
Al-Taawoun (loan)	2016–17	Pro League	4	0	0	0	0	0	5	0	–	–	9	0
Al-Faisaly	2017–18	Pro League	22	5	5	1	1	0	–	–	–	–	28	6
Al-Faisaly	2018–19	Pro League	8	0	1	0	–	–	–	–	3 (Note: Appearances in Arab Club Champions Cup)	0	9	0
Al-Faisaly	Al-Faisaly Total		30	5	6	1	1	0	0	0	3	0	40	6
Damac	2019–20	Pro League	10	2	3	0	–	–	–	–	–	–	13	2
Al-Taawoun	2019–20	Pro League	7	0	0	0	–	–	5	0	–	–	12	0
Al-Taawoun	2020–21	Pro League	24	0	3	0	–	–	–	–	–	–	27	0
Al-Taawoun	2021–22	Pro League	9	0	0	0	–	–	0	0	–	–	9	0
Al-Taawoun	Al-Taawoun Total		40	0	3	0	0	0	5	0	0	0	48	0
Career Total			175	13	21	2	12	1	27	3	4	0	239	19

== Honours ==
Al-Ittihad

- King Cup: 2013

Al-Fayha

- King Cup: 2021–22
