= Evson Patrício =

Brazilian footballer (born 1990)

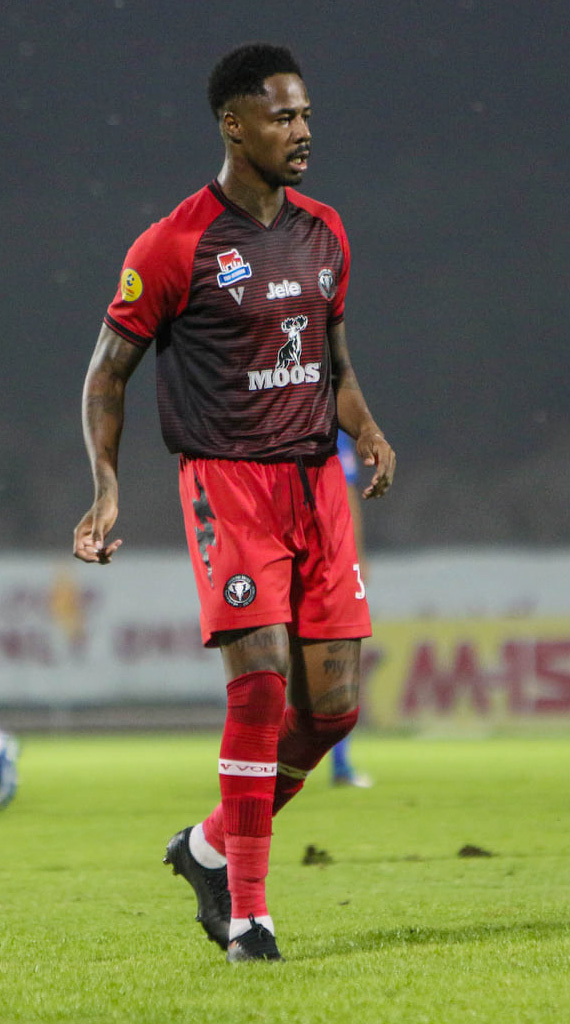

Personal information
- Full name: Evson Patrício Vasconcelos do Nascimento
- Date of birth: December 9, 1990 (age 35)
- Place of birth: Bahia, Brazil
- Height: 1.90 m (6 ft 3 in)
- Position: Centre back

Team information
- Current team: Mahasarakham SBT
- Number: 6

Youth career
- 2009–2010: Vitória Youth

Senior career*
| Years | Team | Apps | (Gls) |
| 2010–2011 | Vitória | | |
| 2012 | Fluminense | | |
| 2013–2018 | Corinthians Alagoano | | |
| 2013 | → CSA (loan) | | |
| 2013 | → Paulista (loan) | | |
| 2014 | → Gamba Osaka (loan) | 0 | (0) |
| 2014–2017 | → Kamatamare Sanuki (loan) | 106 | (7) |
| 2018 | Al-Faisaly | 2 | (0) |
| 2019 | Chiangmai | 26 | (4) |
| 2020–2023 | Chiangmai United | 82 | (9) |
| 2024– | Mahasarakham SBT | 8 | (2) |
- * Club domestic league appearances and goals as of 12 May 2023

Evson Patrício Vanconcelos do Nascimento (born December 9, 1990) is a Brazilian professional footballer who plays as a defender for Mahasarakham SBT in Thai League 2.

== Club statistics ==
Updated to 23 February 2016.

| Club performance | | | League | | Cup | | League Cup | | Total | |
| Season | Club | League | Apps | Goals | Apps | Goals | Apps | Goals | Apps | Goals |
| Japan | | | League | | Emperor's Cup | | J. League Cup | | Total | |
|---|---|---|---|---|---|---|---|---|---|---|
| 2014 | Gamba Osaka | J1 League | 0 | 0 | 0 | 0 | 1 | 0 | 1 | 0 |
| 2014 | Kamatamare Sanuki | J2 League | 16 | 2 | 0 | 0 | – | | 16 | 2 |
| 2015 | Kamatamare Sanuki | J2 League | 33 | 1 | 0 | 0 | – | | 33 | 1 |
| Career total | | | 49 | 3 | 0 | 0 | 1 | 0 | 50 | 3 |
