= Bilel Saidani =

Tunisian footballer

Personal information
- Full name: Bilel Saidani
- Date of birth: 29 June 1993 (age 33)
- Place of birth: Bizerte, Tunisia
- Height: 1.90 m (6 ft 3 in)
- Position: Midfielder

Senior career*
Years	Team	Apps	(Gls)
2013–2019	Bizentin	91	(3)
2019–2020	Al-Sailiya	15	(0)
2020–2021	Damac	28	(3)
2021–2022	Ceramica Cleopatra	17	(0)
2022–2023	Al-Sailiya	10	(0)

International career^{‡}
2019–	Tunisia	3	(0)
- * Club domestic league appearances and goals as of 22:10, 9 May 2019 (UTC) ‡ National team caps and goals as of 14 September 2020

Bilel Saidani (born 29 June 1993) is a Tunisian professional footballer who plays as a midfielder for the Tunisian national team.

== Professional career ==
Saidani made his professional debut with Bizentin in a 1-0 Qatar Stars League loss to ES Tunis on 26 September 2013. On 28 January 2019, Saidani transferred to the Qatari club Al-Sailiya.

== International career ==
Saidani made his professional debut for the Tunisia national football team in a 1-0 friendly loss to Algeria on 26 March 2019.
