= Abdulellah Al-Amer =

Saudi Arabian footballer

Personal information
- Full name: Abdulellah Al-Amer
- Date of birth: 28 February 1990 (age 36)
- Place of birth: Saudi Arabia
- Height: 1.79 m (5 ft 10 1/2 in)
- Position: Center back

Youth career
- Al-Ta'ee

Senior career*
Years	Team	Apps	(Gls)
2010–2015	Al-Ta'ee	??	(7)
2015	Al-Faisaly	5	(1)
2015–2017	Al-Qadsiah	2	(0)
2017–2019	Al-Tai	37	(2)
2019–2020	Al-Shoulla		
- * Club domestic league appearances and goals

Abdulellah Al-Amer (Arabic: عبد الإله العامر, born 28 February 1990) is a Saudi Arabian football player who plays as a center back.
