= Patrick Friday Eze =

Nigerian footballer

Personal information
- Date of birth: 22 December 1992 (age 33)
- Place of birth: Kaduna, Nigeria
- Height: 1.87 m (6 ft 2 in)
- Position: Forward

Youth career
- Ajiya Babes
- Zamfara United

Senior career*
Years	Team	Apps	(Gls)
2011–2012	Africa Sports		
2013	Rad	2	(0)
2014	Napredak Kruševac	3	(0)
2014–2015	Mladost Lučani	26	(15)
2015–2017	Fujairah	24	(14)
2016–2017	→ Al Qadsiah (loan)	24	(5)
2017–2018	Konyaspor	7	(2)
2018	→ Denizlispor (loan)	6	(0)
2019	Raków Częstochowa	6	(1)
2019–2020	Al-Ramtha		
2020–2021	Kukësi	33	(15)
2021–2022	Al Ahli	11	(4)
2022–2023	Ankara Keçiörengücü	12	(0)
2023–2025	Mladost Lučani	40	(8)
2025	Prishtina e Re	11	(1)
- * Club domestic league appearances and goals as of 21 December 2024

Patrick Friday Eze (born 22 December 1992) is a Nigerian professional footballer who plays as a forward.

== Career ==
Born in Kaduna, Eze played with Ajiya Babes and Zamfara United in his homeland, before moving abroad to Ivorian club Africa Sports in 2011. He won the national championship in his first season with the side. Eze also appeared for Africa Sports in the qualification phase for the 2012 CAF Champions League.

In the summer of 2013, Eze moved to Europe and signed with Serbian SuperLiga club Rad. He switched to league rivals Napredak Kruševac in the 2014 winter transfer window. In the summer of 2014, Eze was acquired by newly promoted Mladost Lučani. He scored a hat-trick in a 3–2 home league victory over Spartak Subotica on 7 March 2015. Eze finished the season as the league's top scorer with 15 goals.

In July 2015, Eze moved to the United Arab Emirates and signed with Fujairah. He was the team's top scorer in the 2015–16 UAE Pro League, netting 14 goals in 24 appearances, but failed to save the club from relegation. In July 2016, Eze was sent on a season-long loan to Saudi Pro League side Al Qadsiah.

In August 2017, Eze was transferred to Turkish club Konyaspor, penning a three-year contract. He was loaned out to Denizlispor in January 2018.

After spending half a season without a club, Eze moved to Poland and signed with Raków Częstochowa in early 2019. He helped the side win the I liga to earn promotion to the Ekstraklasa.

== Career statistics ==
As of match played 20 December 2024

Appearances and goals by club, season and competition
Club	Season	League			National cup (Note: Includes Saudi Crown Prince Cup, Turkish Cup, Polish Cup, Albanian Cup, Serbian Cup)		League cup (Note: Includes UAE League Cup, King's Cup, Qatari Stars Cup)		Continental		Total	
Club	Season	Division	Apps	Goals	Apps	Goals	Apps	Goals	Apps	Goals	Apps	Goals
Rad	2013–14	Serbian SuperLiga	2	0	0	0	—		—		2	0
Napredak Kruševac	2013–14	Serbian SuperLiga	3	0	0	0	—		—		3	0
Mladost Lučani	2014–15	Serbian SuperLiga	26	15	0	0	—		—		26	15
Fujairah	2015–16	UAE Pro League	24	14	0	0	3	3	—		27	17
Al Qadsiah (loan)	2016–17	Saudi Pro League	24	5	2	3	1	0	—		27	8
Konyaspor	2017–18	Süper Lig	7	2	2	0	—		2 (Note: Appearances in UEFA Europa League)	0	11	2
Denizlispor (loan)	2017–18	TFF 1. Lig	6	0	0	0	—		—		6	0
Raków Częstochowa	2018–19	I liga	6	1	1	0	—		—		7	1
Kukësi	2020–21	Kategoria Superiore	33	15	2	2	—		2	1	37	18
Al Ahli	2021–22	Qatar Stars League	11	4	0	0	7	6	—		18	10
Ankara Keçiörengücü	2022–23	TFF 1. Lig	12	0	1	1	—		—		13	1
Mladost Lučani	2023–24	Serbian SuperLiga	27	8	1	0	—		—		28	8
Mladost Lučani	2024–25	Serbian SuperLiga	13	0	1	0	—		—		14	0
Mladost Lučani	Total		40	8	2	0	0	0	0	0	42	8
Career total			194	64	10	6	11	9	4	1	219	80

== Honours ==
Africa Sports

- Ligue 1: 2011

Raków Częstochowa

- I liga: 2018–19

Individual

- Serbian SuperLiga top scorer: 2014–15
- Serbian SuperLiga Team of the Season: 2014–15
