= Sultan Al-Deayea =

Saudi Arabian footballer

Personal information
- Full name: Sultan Abdullah Al-Deayea
- Date of birth: March 7, 1993 (age 33)
- Place of birth: Jeddah, Saudi Arabia
- Height: 1.80 m (5 ft 11 in)
- Position: Defender

Team information
- Current team: Al-Muzahimiyyah

Youth career
- –2013: Al-Hilal

Senior career*
Years	Team	Apps	(Gls)
2013–2016	Al-Hilal	17	(1)
2015–2016	→ Al-Shabab (loan)	20	(0)
2016–2017	Al-Shabab	6	(0)
2017–2018	Al-Faisaly	14	(0)
2018–2019	Al-Fateh	2	(0)
2020–2021	Al-Shoulla	21	(0)
2021–2022	Al-Kawkab	11	(0)
2025–2026	Kumait	5	(0)
2026–	Al-Muzahimiyyah	0	(0)
- * Club domestic league appearances and goals

Sultan Abdullah Al-Deayea (Arabic: سلطان عبد الله الدعيع; born 7 March 1993) is a Saudi Arabian football player who currently plays for Al-Muzahimiyyah as a defender.

His father, Abdullah Al-Deayea and uncle Mohamed Al-Deayea are former goalkeepers wo have played for the Saudi Arabia national team.
