= Mohammed Assiri (footballer, born 1995) =

Saudi Arabian footballer

Mohammed Assiri محمد عسيري
Personal information
- Full name: Mohammed Tawfiq Assiri
- Date of birth: 29 May 1995 (age 31)
- Place of birth: Saudi Arabia
- Height: 1.80 m (5 ft 11 in)
- Position: Forward

Team information
- Current team: Al-Dera'a
- Number: 29

Youth career
- 2013–2016: Al-Faisaly

Senior career*
| Years | Team | Apps | (Gls) |
| 2016–2018 | Al-Faisaly | 1 | (0) |
| 2017–2018 | → Najran (loan) | | |
| 2018 | Najd | | |
| 2018–2019 | Arar | | |
| 2021–2022 | Al-Tuhami | | |
| 2024 | Al-Eetemad | | |
| 2025– | Al-Dera'a | | |
- * Club domestic league appearances and goals

Mohammed Tawfiq Assiri (Arabic: محمد توفيق عسيري, born 29 May 1995) is a Saudi Arabian professional footballer who plays for Al-Dera'a as a forward.

== Career ==
Assiri started his career at Al-Faisaly and is a product of the Al-Faisaly's youth system. On 6 April 2017, Assiri made his professional debut for Al-Faisaly against Al-Taawoun in the Pro League. He then played with Najran, Najd, and Arar.

== Career statistics ==
=== Club ===
As of match played 29 July 2020

| Club | Season | League | | King Cup | | Asia | | Other | | Total | |
| Club | Season | Apps | Goals | Apps | Goals | Apps | Goals | Apps | Goals | Apps | Goals |
|---|---|---|---|---|---|---|---|---|---|---|---|
| Al-Faisaly | 2016–17 | 1 | 0 | 0 | 0 | — | | | — | 1 | 0 |
| Al-Faisaly | Total | 1 | 0 | 0 | 0 | 0 | 0 | 0 | 0 | 1 | 0 |
| Career totals | | 1 | 0 | 0 | 0 | 0 | 0 | 0 | 0 | 1 | 0 |
