= Abdullah Awaji =

Saudi football player

Personal information
- Full name: Abdullah Awaji
- Date of birth: March 20, 1994 (age 32)
- Place of birth: Saudi Arabia
- Position: Midfielder

Team information
- Current team: Al-Bateen
- Number: 21

Youth career
- Al-Faisaly

Senior career*
Years	Team	Apps	(Gls)
2015–2018	Al-Faisaly	1	(0)
2018	→ Al-Watani (loan)		
2018–2021	Al-Mujazzal		
2021–2022	Al-Riyadh		
2022–2023	Sajer		
2023–2024	Al Selmiyah		
2025–	Al-Bateen		
- * Club domestic league appearances and goals

Abdullah Awaji is a Saudi football player who plays for Al-Bateen as a midfielder, most recently..
