= Suliman Sofyani =

Saudi Arabian association football player

Suliman Sofyani سليمان سفياني
Personal information
- Full name: Suliman Issa Sofyani
- Date of birth: 2 February 1991 (age 35)
- Place of birth: Saudi Arabia
- Height: 1.80 m (5 ft 11 in)
- Position: Goalkeeper

Team information
- Current team: Munief
- Number: 30

Youth career
- Al-Shabab

Senior career*
Years	Team	Apps	(Gls)
2011–2013	Al-Shabab		
2013–2014	Al-Kawkab		
2014–2015	Al-Mujazzal		
2015–2017	Al-Faisaly		
2017–2018	Al-Nojoom		
2018–2019	Al-Mujazzal		
2019	Al-Shoulla		
2019–2020	Al-Mujazzal		
2020	Al-Nojoom		
2020–2021	Al-Sahel		
2021–2022	Wej		
2022–2023	Al-Nahda		
2023–2024	Al-Sharq		
2024	Afif		
2024–2025	Al-Muzahimiyyah		
2025–	Munief		
- * Club domestic league appearances and goals as of 12 May 2020

Suliman Sofyani (Arabic: سليمان سفياني, born 2 February 1991) is a Saudi Arabian professional footballer who plays as a goalkeeper for Munief.

== Career ==
Sofyani began his career at youth Al-Shabab . left Al-Shabab and signed with Al-Kawkab on July 3, 2013 . left Al-Kawkab and signed with Al-Mujazzal on May 30, 2014 . left Al-Mujazzal and signed with Al-Faisaly on June 8, 2015 . left Al-Faisaly and signed with Al-Nojoom on July 16, 2017 . left Al-Nojoom and signed with Al-Mujazzal on July 16, 2018 . left Al-Mujazzal and signed with Al-Shoulla on January 22, 2019. left Al-Shoulla and signed with Al-Mujazzal on July 25, 2019. left Al-Mujazzal and signed with Al-Nojoom on January 19, 2020. left Al-Nojoom and signed with Al-Sahel on October 20, 2020. On 28 July 2022, Sofyani joined Al-Nahda. On 9 January 2024, Sofyani joined Afif. On 2 September 2024, Sofyani joined Al-Muzahimiyyah.
