= Mohammed Assiri (footballer, born 1992) =

Saudi Arabian footballer

Personal information
- Full name: Mohammed Hassan Assiri
- Date of birth: October 18, 1992 (age 34)
- Place of birth: Saudi Arabia
- Height: 1.78 m (5 ft 10 in)
- Position: Goalkeeper

Youth career
- Al-Qadisiyah

Senior career*
Years	Team	Apps	(Gls)
2013–2019	Al-Qadisiyah	7	(0)
2019	Al-Batin	0	(0)
2019–2020	Al-Thoqbah	32	(0)
2020–2021	Al-Adalah	7	(0)
2021–2022	Al-Sahel	19	(0)
2022–2023	Al-Taraji		
2023–2024	Al-Taqadom		
2024–2026	Al-Nojoom	44	(0)
- * Club domestic league appearances and goals

Mohammed Assiri (Arabic: محمد عسيري, born 18 October 1992) is a Saudi Arabian football player who currently plays as a goalkeeper.

== Club career ==
=== Al-Qadisiyah ===
In 2013, Assiri joined Al-Qadisiyah. He played his debut against Al-Ahli on 15 October 2016, which they lost 2-0. On 21 October 2016, he played his second match in the league against Al-Batin F.C., which the drew 1-1. His last match of the 2016-17 was against Al-Faisaly, which Al-Qadisiyah lost 3-2. On 11 August 2017, Assiri won his first match ever against Al-Raed 2-1.
