= Murad Al-Rashidi =

Saudi Arabian footballer

Personal information
- Full name: Murad Al-Rashidi
- Date of birth: March 12, 1991 (age 35)
- Place of birth: Saudi Arabia
- Height: 1.75 m (5 ft 9 in)
- Position: Midfielder

Team information
- Current team: Radwa
- Number: 50

Youth career
- ???–2009: Al-Khaldi
- 2009–2012: Al Ahli

Senior career*
Years	Team	Apps	(Gls)
2012–2013	Al-Taawoun FC	6	(0)
2013–2016	Hajer		
2016–2018	Al-Raed	31	(1)
2018–2019	Al-Washm	26	(2)
2019	Al-Adalah	0	(0)
2019–2020	Al-Washm	5	(0)
2020	Damac	4	(0)
2020–2021	Al-Jabalain	15	(0)
2021–2022	Al-Najma		
2022–2023	Wej		
2023–2024	Radwa		
2024–2025	Al-Khaldi		
2025–	Radwa		
- * Club domestic league appearances and goals

Murad Al-Rashidi (Arabic: مراد الرشيدي; born March 12, 1991) is a Saudi football player who plays for Radwa as a midfielder.
