= Fahad Al-Munaif (footballer, born 1994) =

Saudi Arabian footballer

Personal information
- Full name: Fahad Ibrahim Al-Munaif
- Date of birth: May 10, 1994 (age 32)
- Place of birth: Saudi Arabia
- Position: Defender

Team information
- Current team: Al-Orobah
- Number: 44

Youth career
- Al-Faisaly

Senior career*
Years	Team	Apps	(Gls)
2015–2018	Al-Faisaly	19	(1)
2017	→ Al-Nojoom (loan)		
2017–2018	→ Al-Orobah (loan)	20	(0)
2018–2019	Al-Qaisumah	27	(2)
2019–2021	Al-Kawkab	70	(3)
2021–2022	Al-Adalah	24	(0)
2022–2023	Al-Riyadh	17	(0)
2023–2025	Neom	28	(2)
2025–	Al-Orobah	0	(0)
- * Club domestic league appearances and goals

Fahad Ibrahim Al-Munaif (Arabic: فهد إبراهيم المنيف, born 10 May 1994) is a Saudi footballer who plays as a defender for Al-Orobah.

On 16 June 2022, Al-Munaif joined Al-Riyadh. On 19 September 2023, Al-Munaif joined Neom. On 15 August 2025, Al-Munaif joined Al-Orobah.

== Honours ==
Al-Adalah

- First Division runners-up: 2021–22 (promotion to Pro League)

Al-Riyadh

- First Division fourth place: 2022–23 (promotion to Pro League)

Neom

- First Division: 2024–25
- Saudi Second Division League: 2023–24
